= Emily Nahon =

Indonesian footballer (born 2007)

Personal information
- Full name: Emily Julia Frederica Nahon
- Date of birth: 17 May 2007 (age 19)
- Place of birth: Oegstgeest, Netherlands
- Height: 1.70 m (5 ft 7 in)
- Position: Centre-back

Team information
- Current team: Little Rock Trojans
- Number: 8

Youth career
- –2022: VVSB
- 2022–2025: ADO Den Haag

College career
Years	Team	Apps	(Gls)
2025–	Little Rock Trojans		

International career
2025–	Indonesia	17	(3)

Emily Julia Frederica Nahon (born 17 May 2007) is a professional footballer who plays as a centre-back for the NCAA Division I club Little Rock Trojans. Born in the Netherlands, she plays for the Indonesia national team.

== Early life ==
Nahon was born in Oegstgeest, Netherlands, on 17 May 2007. She is of Indonesian descent through her father, Vincent Rudolf Nahon. Her paternal grandmother, Julie Margot Rancuret, was born in Bogor, West Java, on 29 April 1949.

== Club career ==
=== ADO Den Haag ===
Nahon began playing football in the youth system of ADO Den Haag at the age of 14. She initially played for the club's under-16 team between 2021 and 2023 before progressing to its under-19 side in the 2023–24 season. She also made appearances for the club's senior team.

=== Little Rock Trojans ===
In 2025, Nahon joined the Little Rock Trojans women's soccer programme at the University of Arkansas at Little Rock in the United States. She competed in NCAA Division I women's soccer during the 2025 season.

She remained on the Little Rock Trojans roster for the 2026 season, listed as a sophomore defender wearing number 8.

== International career ==
Nahon was called up to the Indonesia national team in preparation for the 2026 AFC Women's Asian Cup qualification. She made her senior international debut against the Kyrgyztan, helping Indonesia secure a 1–0 victory.

On 10 June 2025, Nahon obtained Indonesian citizenship alongside fellow Dutch-born footballers Felicia de Zeeuw, Iris de Rouw and Isa Warps. The four players were naturalised to strengthen Indonesia's women's national team for upcoming international competitions.

Nahon represented Indonesia at the 2025 SEA Games women's football tournament, where Indonesia finished in fourth place.

In July 2026, Nahon was part of the Indonesian squad that won the 2026 AFF Women's Cup. She scored in Indonesia's 2–0 group-stage victory over Timor-Leste on 10 July 2026.

She also scored in the final against the Laos on 22 July 2026, when Indonesia won 5–0 to secure the title. Nahon scored Indonesia's fifth goal in the match, contributing to the team's championship victory.

== Personal life ==
Nahon is the daughter of Vincent Rudolf Nahon and Martine Alexandra Fluitsma. Her Indonesian ancestry comes from her paternal grandmother, who was born in Bogor, Indonesia.

While playing for Little Rock, Nahon pursued studies in business and marketing at the University of Arkansas at Little Rock.

== Career statistics ==
=== International goals ===
As of 19 October 2026
Indonesia score listed first, score column indicates score after each Nahon goal

List of international goals scored by Emily Nahon
No.	Date	Venue	Opponent	Score	Result	Competition
1.	15 April 2026	Ratchaburi Stadium, Ratchaburi, Thailand	New Caledonia	1–0	4–2	2026 FIFA Series
2.	10 July 2026	Kuala Lumpur Stadium, Kuala Lumpur, Malaysia	Timor-Leste	1–0	2–0	2026 AFF Women's Cup
3.	22 July 2026	Kuala Lumpur Stadium, Kuala Lumpur, Malaysia	Laos	5–0	5–0	2026 AFF Women's Cup

== Honours ==
Indonesia

- AFF Women's Cup: 2026

== See also ==
- List of Indonesia international footballers born outside Indonesia
