= Laos women's national football team =

Women's association football team

Laos
- Association: Lao Football Federation
- Confederation: AFC (Asia)
- Sub-confederation: AFF (Southeast Asia)
- Head coach: Phonethip Sengmany
- Top scorer: Souphavanh Phayvanh (19)
- Home stadium: New Laos National Stadium
- FIFA code: LAO
First colours	Second colours

FIFA ranking
- Current: 117 ▼4 (16 June 2026)
- Highest: 73 (June 2009; December 2009)
- Lowest: 117 (June 2026)

First international
- Thailand 13–1 Laos (Yangon, Myanmar; 6 September 2007)

Biggest win
- Indonesia 0–11 Laos (Vientiane, Laos; 16 October 2011)

Biggest defeat
- Laos 1–14 Thailand (Ho Chi Minh City, Vietnam; 22 September 2012)

AFF Championship
- Appearances: 7 (first in 2007)
- Best result: Fourth place (2011, 2012)

The Laos women's national football team (Lao: ທີມຊາດຍິງລາວ) is the senior women's football team representing Laos. and is overseen by the Lao Football Federation.

== History ==
In 2005, Laos was among the Southeast Asian nations, alongside other neighboring countries, anticipated to field a women's team for the SEA Games held in Marikina in December. The women's team was not established until 2007, making its international debut at the 2007 AFF Women's Championship. On 6 September 2007, it faced the Thailand team, undergoing a 1–13 defeat, with Souphavanh Phayvanh scoring Laos first-ever goal in the 70th minute.

The year 2011 saw Laos host the AFF Women's Championship for the first time and reach the semifinals for the first time in the tournament’s history. The team secured its biggest result with an 11–0 victory over the Indonesia team, and finished fourth after losses to Vietnam and Thailand.

In 2015, Laos participated in its first Olympic qualifying tournament and was eliminated in the first round after losses to the Chinese Taipei team and Iran.

After not playing a single match between 2015 and 2021, the team returned to action and participated in its first Asian Cup Qualifying campaign in 2021. Drawn into Group A, the team was eliminated after a loss to Chinese Taipei and a draw with hosts Bahrain.

== Results and fixtures ==
Legend

Win Draw Lose

=== 2026 ===
10 June Friendly	Saudi Arabia	4–0	Laos	Bangkok, Thailand
19:00 UTC+7	Al-Yahya 6'; Al-Omaysi 45+2', 70'; Abdullah 52'	Report		Stadium: Windmill Football Club Stadium; Referee: Supiree Testhomya (Thailand)

13 June Friendly	Saudi Arabia	5–1	Laos	Bangkok, Thailand
19:00 UTC+7	Abdullah 15', 52', 73'; Al-Saiari 75'; Balkhudher 77'		Chanthithong 71'	Stadium: Windmill Football Club Stadium

10 July 2026 AFF Women's Cup GS	Laos	1–1	Malaysia	Kuala Lumpur, Malaysia
20:45 UTC+8	Kemmy 37'	Report	Nurhadfina 50'	Stadium: Kuala Lumpur Stadium; Referee: Asaka Koizumi (Japan)

13 July 2026 AFF Women's Cup GS	Singapore	1–1	Laos	Kuala Lumpur, Malaysia
20:45 UTC+8	Tan 47'	Report	Anna 41'	Stadium: Kuala Lumpur Stadium; Referee: Bùi Thị Thu Trang (Vietnam)

19 July 2026 AFF Women's Cup SF	Cambodia	0–1	Laos	Kuala Lumpur, Malaysia
16:45 UTC+8			Anna 1'	Stadium: Kuala Lumpur Stadium

22 July 2026 AFF Women's Cup Final	Laos	0–5	Indonesia	Kuala Lumpur, Malaysia
20:45 UTC+8		Report	Hopper 33'; Nottet 48'; Loupatty 55'; De Zeeuw 68'; Nahon 84'	Stadium: Kuala Lumpur Stadium; Referee: Asaka Koizumi (Japan)

== Coaching staff ==
Position	Name
Team manager	(Laos) Manila Alounlangsy (Laos) Kaikesy Phommavanh
Head coach	(Laos) Phonethip Sengmany
Assistant coach	(Laos) Vilayvanh Panyanouvong
Assistant coach	(Laos) Phoutthasack Silikoun
Assistant coach	(Laos) Meenou Phakdy
Goalkeeper coach	(Laos) Phouth Khamsoukthavong
Health/Medical officer	(Laos) Tictar Duangphachan
Health/Medical officer	(Laos) Onta Maneeseng
Media manager	(Laos) Phuetsapha Phannamvong
Kit manager	(Laos) Lasamy

=== Managerial history ===
Name	Period	Achievements
(Japan) Honma Kei	2013	
(Laos) Kovanh Namthavixay	2015	
(Laos) Donesavanh Xaiyasombat	2021	
(Laos) Vongmisay Soubouakham	2022	
(Singapore) Mohammad Herman Zailani	2023	
(Japan) Nayuha Toyoda.	2023–2025	

== Players ==
=== Current squad ===
The following players were called up for the 2026 AFC Women's Asian Cup qualification matches in June–July 2025.

No.	Pos.	Player	Date of birth (age)	Club
1	GK	Phatthavany Sisoksila		(Lao Football Federation)
12	GK	Danine Sythivong		(Lao Football Federation)
18	GK	Minid Ladsavanh		(Lao Football Federation)
2	DF	Thadsany Phoudiengchan		(Lao Football Federation)
3	DF	Phayavanh Vilachan		(Lao Football Federation)
4	DF	Nanthavanh Sivsou		(Lao Football Federation)
8	DF	Nuyphon Phoudiengchan		(Lao Football Federation)
13	DF	Khampan Nyommyxay		(Lao Football Federation)
16	DF	Suphavan Vinhthanynom		(Lao Football Federation)
17	DF	Vilaychan Visedsanya		(Lao Football Federation)
6	MF	Latda Vilachan		(Lao Football Federation)
9	MF	Namikarn Vanphasath		(Lao Football Federation)
14	MF	Simala Khumphasy		(Lao Football Federation)
15	MF	Phong Tetsavanh		(Lao Football Federation)
19	MF	Thanta Chanthithad		(Lao Football Federation)
20	MF	Sayphon Thanphabou		(Lao Football Federation)
21	MF	Vinlath Bunkhammy		(Lao Football Federation)
22	MF	Sengsavanh Phoudiengchan		(Lao Football Federation)
23	MF	Phengphian Phimphasyda		(Lao Football Federation)
7	FW	Damy Phatkasath		(Lao Football Federation)
10	FW	Dalisa Vong Aouyvilisy		(Lao Football Federation)
11	FW	Xaykham Xayjalit		(Lao Football Federation)

=== Recent call-ups ===
The following players have been called up to the Laos women's national team within the last 12 months.

No.	Pos.	Player	Date of birth (age)	Caps	Club

== Competitive records ==
=== FIFA Women's World Cup ===
FIFA Women's World Cup record
Year	Round	Position	Pld	W	D*	L	GS	GA
1991–2007	Did not exist							
2011–2019	Did not enter							
(Australia) (New Zealand) 2023	Did not qualify							
(Brazil) 2027	Did not qualify							
(Costa Rica) (Jamaica) (Mexico) (United States) 2031	To be determined							
(United Kingdom) 2035	To be determined							
Total								

=== Olympic Games ===
Summer Olympics record
Year	Round	Position	Pld	W	D*	L	GS	GA
1996–2004	Did not exist							
2008–2012	Did not enter							
(Brazil) 2016	Did not qualify							
2020–2024	Did not enter							
(United States) 2028	Did not qualify							
(Australia) 2032	To be determined							
Total								

=== AFC Women's Asian Cup ===
AFC Women's Asian Cup record
Year	Round	Position	Pld	W	D*	L	GS	GA
1975–2006	Did not exist							
2008–2018	Did not enter							
(India) 2022	Did not qualify							
(Australia) 2026	Did not qualify							
(Uzbekistan) 2029	To be determined							
Total								

=== Asian Games ===
Asian Games record
Year	Round	Position	Pld	W	D*	L	GS	GA
1990–2006	Did not exist							
2010–2022	Did not enter							
(Japan) 2026	Did not qualify							
(Qatar) 2030	To be determined							
(Saudi Arabia) 2034	To be determined							
Total								

=== ASEAN Women's Championship ===
ASEAN Women's Championship record
Year	Round	Position	Pld	W	D*	L	GS	GA
2004–2006	Did not exist							
(Myanmar) 2007	Group stage	6th	3	1	0	2	4	21
(Vietnam) 2008	Group stage	5th	4	2	0	2	4	14
(Laos) 2011	Fourth place	4th	5	2	0	3	16	14
(Vietnam) 2012	Fourth place	4th	4	1	0	3	4	26
(Myanmar) 2013	Group stage	8th	4	1	0	3	5	17
(Vietnam) 2015	Group stage	6th	3	1	0	2	2	13
2016–2019	Did not enter							
(Philippines) 2022	Group stage	7th	4	1	1	2	4	9
(Vietnam) 2025	Did not qualify							
2027	Qualified							
Total			27	9	1	17	69	114

=== AFF Women's Cup ===
AFF Women's Cup record
Year	Round	Position	Pld	W	D*	L	GF	GA
(Laos) 2024	Group stage	5th	2	0	1	1	0	1
(Malaysia) 2026	Runners-up	2nd	4	1	2	1	3	7
Total			6	1	3	2	3	8

=== SEA Games ===
SEA Games record
Year	Round	Position	Pld	W	D*	L	GS	GA
1985–2005	Did not exist							
(Thailand) 2007	Fourth place	4th	4	0	1	3	3	19
(Laos) 2009	Fourth place	4th	4	1	1	2	7	8
(Myanmar) 2013	Group stage	5th	2	0	0	2	1	8
2017–2019	Did not enter							
(Vietnam) 2021	Group stage	6th	3	0	0	3	0	9
(Cambodia) 2023	Group stage	8th	3	0	0	3	1	10
(Thailand) 2025	Did not enter							
(Malaysia) 2027	To be determined							
(Singapore) 2029	To be determined							
(Laos) 2031	To be determined							
(Philippines) 2033	To be determined							
Total			16	1	2	13	12	54

== See also ==
- Sport in Laos
  - Football in Laos
- Laos national football team
- Laos national football team results
- Laos national under-23 football team
- Laos national under-21 football team
- Laos national under-20 football team
- Laos national under-17 football team
- Laos national futsal team
- Laos national beach soccer team
