= Singapore women's national football team =

Singapore
- Nickname: The Lionesses
- Association: Football Association of Singapore
- Confederation: AFC (Asia)
- Sub-confederation: AFF (Southeast Asia)
- Head coach: Mihoko Ishida
- Captain: Kusumawati Rosman
- Home stadium: Jalan Besar Stadium
- FIFA code: SGP
First colours	Second colours

FIFA ranking
- Current: 147 ▲4 (20 October 2026)
- Highest: 82 (December 2009)
- Lowest: 152 (December 2025 – April 2026)

First international
- Thailand 3–0 Singapore (Hong Kong; 27 August 1975)

Biggest win
- Singapore 9–0 Macau (Singapore; 16 July 2024); Singapore 9–0 Seychelles (Singapore; 25 November 2025)

Biggest defeat
- North Korea 24–0 Singapore (Taipei, Taiwan; 6 December 2001)

Asian Cup
- Appearances: 7 (first in 1975)
- Best result: Third place (1977)

AFF Championship
- Appearances: 9 (first in 2004)
- Best result: Group stage

The Singapore women's national football team represents the city-state of Singapore in international women's football and is organised by the Football Association of Singapore (FAS), the governing body for football in Singapore.

== History ==
Football Association of Singapore (FAS) became responsible for the development of women's football in 2000, and a women's football department was established in 2004. Women's football in Singapore has become more popular since then.

In 2015, FAS started its first all-girl training centres for those aged five to 12 at Bowen and Queensway Secondary Schools with a combined intake of about 30. The ‘A’ and Under-14 Women’s National Teams were honoured when Moya Dodd, FIFA Executive Committee member, Asian Football Confederation (AFC) Vice President and Chairman of the AFC Women’s Football Committee, paid a visit at the training session during her Singapore stopover on 17 April 2015.

In July 2015, the Lionesses were invited to compete in the Luen Thai Cup tournament in Hong Kong. It was considered a milestone moment for the team as the quadrangular was the first international tournament that the team participated in since 2013. They took on Chelsea Hong Kong SC, Northern Mariana Islands All-Stars and Guangdong Agriculture University Team.

On 29 January 2016, the Lionesses played their first international match in two years, losing 1-0 to Sri Lanka at Jalan Besar Stadium. The team comprises players with an average age of 23. The Lionesses was removed the FIFA women's football world rankings because of the 2-year hiatus from international football.

Singapore hosted Indonesia, Luxembourg and the Maldives for the FAS International Women’s Quadrangular 2018. The tournament was supported by the UEFA Assist programme – an international programme by the European confederation to provide practical support in the development of football to member associations and confederations worldwide. The Lionesses lost 4-0 to Luxembourg in the final.

In 2019, the third all-girl training centre was launched at Meridian Secondary School. Promising players at these FAS training centres were then placed in an Under-12 development squad that was formed in 2018. As of 2020, there were four women's national teams - 'A' team, Under-19, Under-16 and Under-14 - representing Singapore in international competitions.

In preparation for the 2021 SEA Games, the Lionesses played their first-ever ticketed matches in the 2022 FAS Tri-Nations Series. This was also the first time in four years for the team to play in front of a home crowd. The last time the team played at home was for the FAS International Women's Quadrangular in 2018. During the 2021 SEA Games, they registered their first win in nearly 37 years by defeating Laos 1-0. They had not won a match at the SEA Games since 1985.

On 13 July 2022, the Lionesses claimed their first victory at the AFF Women's Championship in 18 years by defeating a depleted Indonesia side 2-0 at Binan Football Stadium in Manila. Indonesia could name only four substitutes as nine players were unwell. They finished fourth with four points in the six-team Group A.

On 14 October 2022, the FAS announced that by mutual agreement, Stephen Ng would step down from his role as Singapore Women’s National Team Head Coach with effect 31 October 2022. Former international Ratna Suffian, who served as Ng’s assistant, took over as the interim coach. Karim Bencherifa was appointed as the new Women’s National Team Head Coach from 1 March 2023.

On 6 December 2024, the Lionesses defeated Timor-Leste 1-0 in the 2024 AFF Women's Cup third-place play-off to ensure their qualification for the 2025 ASEAN Women's Championship. However, on 9 June 2025, FAS announced that the team would not be participating in the competition, seven hours after the draw ceremony. The decision was influenced by the need to manage player welfare, maintain performance standards and prepare the teams for the challenges ahead. The Lionesses would then focus on the remaining three competitions, namely AFC Women's Asian Cup qualifiers, AFC Under-20 Women's Asian Cup qualifiers and the 2025 SEA Games, that were held later that year.

On 23 July 2026, Singapore finished third at the AFF Women’s Cup after defeating Cambodia 4–3 in a penalty shoot-out, following a 1–1 draw. The result secured the team’s qualification for the 2027 ASEAN Women’s Championship, with goalkeeper Izairida Shakira saving two penalties in the shoot-out.

== Results and fixtures ==
The following is a list of matches in the last 12 months, as well as any future matches that have been scheduled.

Legend

Win Draw Loss Fixtures

=== 2025 ===
25 November 2025 Friendly	Singapore	9–0	Seychelles	Bukit Gombak, Singapore
19:30 UTC+8	F. Ruhaizat; S. Zu’risqha; R. Azman; S. Rosielin; (o.g.)	Report		Stadium: Bukit Gombak Stadium; Attendance: 0 (Behind-closed-doors)

28 November 2025 Friendly	Singapore	7–0	Seychelles	Bukit Gombak, Singapore
19:30 UTC+8	L.X. Lim 13'; F. Ruhaizat 16'; S. Zu’risqha 36', 40'; D. Tan 51', 71'; S. Nurinsyirah 65'	Report		Stadium: Bukit Gombak Stadium

7 December 2025 SEA Games	Singapore	1–3	Indonesia	Chonburi, Thailand
16:00 UTC+7	Ruhaizat 22'		Warps 31'; Scheunemann 62'; Aulia 90+5'	Stadium: IPE Chonburi Stadium; Referee: Esra'a Almbaidin (Jordan)

10 December 2025 SEA Games	Thailand	2–0	Singapore	Chonburi, Thailand
18:30 UTC+7	Kanyanat 9'; Orapin 18'	Report		Stadium: Chonburi Stadium; Referee: Rebecca Durcau (Australia)

=== 2026 ===
3 June 2026 Friendly	Indonesia	0–2	Singapore	Bandung, Indonesia
20:00 UTC+8			Danelle Tan 10'; Nicole Lim 22'	Stadium: Arcamanik Stadium

6 June 2026 Friendly	Singapore	0–5	Cambodia	Bandung, Indonesia
19:00 UTC+8		Report	Hok Saody 13', 15'; Ti Samnang; Yon Yoeurn 78'; Vibol Serysitha 84'	Stadium: Arcamanik Stadium

13 July 2026 2026 AFF Women's Cup GS	Singapore	1–1	Laos	Kuala Lumpur, Malaysia
20:45 UTC+8	Tan 47'	Report	Anna 41'	Stadium: Kuala Lumpur Stadium; Referee: Bùi Thị Thu Trang (Vietnam)

16 July 2026 2026 AFF Women's Cup GS	Malaysia	1–3	Singapore	Kuala Lumpur, Malaysia
20:45 UTC+8	Henrietta 58'	Report	Suresh 12'; Tan 44', 72' (pen.)	Stadium: Kuala Lumpur Stadium; Referee: Pansa Chaisanit (Thailand)

19 July 2026 2026 AFF Women's Cup Semi-finals	Singapore	0–2	Indonesia	Kuala Lumpur, Malaysia
20:45 UTC+8		Report	Gea 68'; Remini 80'	Stadium: Kuala Lumpur Stadium; Referee: Asaka Koizumi (Japan)

22 July 2026 2026 AFF Women's Cup Third place match	Cambodia	1–1 (3–4 p)	Singapore	Kuala Lumpur, Malaysia
16:45 UTC+8	Vipha 70' (pen.)	Report	Tan 24'	Stadium: Kuala Lumpur Stadium; Referee: Jon Mick Pineda (Philippines)
	Penalties
	Maysam (penalty scored); Vipha (penalty scored); Serysitha (penalty missed); Samnang (penalty scored); Sovannomy (penalty missed)		(penalty scored) Mulan; (penalty missed) Li Xian; (penalty scored) Ruzi; (penalty scored) Farah; (penalty scored) Sarah

1 December 2026 Friendly	Singapore	v	Bangladesh	Singapore
19:30 UTC+8				Stadium: Bishan Stadium
Note: Match will be held behind closed doors at Bishan Stadium.

5 December 2026 Friendly	Singapore	v	Bangladesh	Singapore
19:30 UTC+8				Stadium: Jalan Besar Stadium

== Coaching staff ==
As of 5 July 2024

Position	Name
Team manager	(Singapore) Nur Atika Leman
Head coach	(Japan) Mihoko Ishida
Assistant Coach(es)	(Singapore) Fazrul Nawaz
Assistant Coach(es)	(Singapore) Yeong Sheau Shyan
Goalkeeper Coach	(Singapore) Daniel Ong
Individual Coach	(Singapore) Lim Ying Xuan Venetia
Match Analyst	(Singapore) Fairuz Ali
Head Football Science and Medicine	(Malaysia) Firdaus Massar
Senior Sports Trainer	(Singapore) Nasruldin Baharuddin
Sports Trainer	(Singapore) Muklis Sawit
Masseur	(Singapore) Gurnaya Singh
Sports Scientist	(Singapore) Faizal Khalid Abdul Aziz
Physiotherapist	(Singapore) Nurhafizah Abu Sujad
Kit Manager	(Singapore) Omar Mohd
Media Officer	(Singapore) Chia Pui San

=== Head coaching history ===
- (Singapore) Mohamed Hisham Bin Roslan (2013)
- (Singapore) Chen Cai Ying (Jul 2015 - Apr 2017)
- (Singapore) K. Balagumaran (Apr 2017 – Oct 2018)
- (Singapore) Muhammad Razif Ariff Bin Bahari (Oct 2018 - Nov 2018, as interim )
- (Singapore) Melisa Ye Hui Ting (Nov 2018 - Dec 2019)
- (Singapore) Ratna Suffian (Dec 2019 – Mar 2021, as caretaker)
- (Singapore) Stephen Ng Heng Seng (Mar 2021 – Oct 2022)
- (Singapore) Ratna Suffian (Nov 2022 – Feb 2023, as interim)
- (Morocco) Karim Bencherifa (Mar 2023 – Apr 2026)
- (Japan) Mihoko Ishida (Apr 2026 - Present)

== Players ==
=== Current squad ===
The following 23 players are called up to the squad for AFF Women’s Cup 2026.

Caps and goals updated 5 June 2026 following the match against Cambodia.

No.	Pos.	Player	Date of birth (age)	Caps	Goals	Club
	GK	Izairida Shakira	2 June 2007 (age 19)	12	0	(Football Association of Singapore) Lion City Sailors
	GK	Alysha Nasrina	23 October 2007 (age 19)	1	0	(Football Association of Singapore) Lion City Sailors
	GK	Lamasan Chantale	11 January 2009 (age 17)	1	0	(United States Soccer Federation) IMG Academy (USA)
	DF	Siti Rosnani Binte Azman	22 May 1997 (age 29)	57	2	(Football Association of Singapore) Albirex Jurong
	DF	Dhaniyah Qasimah	7 July 2004 (age 22)	40	0	(Football Association of Singapore) Lion City Sailors
	DF	Umairah Hamdan	11 March 2002 (age 24)	32	0	(Football Association of Singapore) Lion City Sailors
	DF	Irsalina Binte Irwan	1 January 2007 (age 19)	14	1	(Football Association of Singapore) Lion City Sailors
	DF	Qarrisa Putri Ramadhani	24 October 2008 (age 18)	11	0	(Football Association of Singapore) Frenz Circuit GDT
	DF	Yasmine Binte Zaharin	19 March 2008 (age 18)	13	0	(United States Soccer Federation) IMG Academy (USA)
	DF	Seri Nurinsyirah	29 January 2009 (age 17)	4	1	(United States Soccer Federation) IMG Academy (USA)
	MF	Syazwani Ruzi	20 December 2001 (age 24)	44	1	(Football Association of Singapore) Lion City Sailors
	MF	Lim Li Xian	24 November 1996 (age 29)	39	2	(Football Association of Singapore) Tiong Bahru
	MF	Venetia Lim Ying Xuan	14 October 2003 (age 23)	27	1	(Football Association of Singapore) Lion City Sailors
	MF	Sarah Zu’risqha Zul’kepli	24 July 2006 (age 20)	12	4	(Football Association of Singapore) Geylang International
	MF	Kyra Elise Taylor	19 June 2006 (age 20)	10	1	(Scottish Football Association) University of St Andrews
	MF	Ain Salleh Ying Xuan	1 January 2010 (age 16)	2	0	(Football Association of Singapore) Lion City Sailors
	MF	Yuvika Suresh	1 March 2009 (age 17)	2	0	(United States Soccer Federation) IMG Academy (USA)
	MF	Mulan Ayliffe	10 May 2008 (age 18)	0	0	(Football Association of Serbia) Partizan Belgrade
	FW	Farhanah Ruhaizat	26 July 1998 (age 28)	52	8	(Football Association of Singapore) Geylang International
	FW	Danelle Tan	25 October 2004 (age 22)	28	10	(Japan Football Association) Nippon TV Tokyo Verdy Beleza
	FW	Farah Nurzahirah	13 January 2004 (age 22)	12	1	(Football Association of Singapore) Lion City Sailors
	FW	Naureen Qadriyah	9 June 2009 (age 17)	0	0	(Football Association of Singapore) Geylang International
	FW	Raeka Ee	16 September 2003 (age 23)	4	0	(Football Association of Singapore) Lion City Sailors

=== Recent call-ups ===
The following players have also been called up to the squad in the last 36 months.

Pos.	Player	Date of birth (age)	Caps	Goals	Club	Latest call-up
GK	Nurul Illyanis	27 January 2007 (age 19)	2	0	(Singapore) Geylang International	v. Cambodia, 5 June 2026
GK	Talia Sachet	10 July 2009 (age 17)	0	0	(Singapore) Albirex Jurong	v. Cambodia, 5 June 2026
GK	Tan Li Bin Beatrice	29 June 1992 (age 34)	15	0	(Singapore) Lion City Sailors	Apr 26 Sabah Camp
GK	Elizabeth Tan Yip Zheng	6 February 2002 (age 24)	0	0	(Singapore) Tanjong Pagar United	v. Thailand, 10 Dec 2026
GK	Hazel Lim	3 March 2002 (age 24)	4	0	(Singapore) Lion City Sailors	v. Saudi Arabia, 29 Oct 2025
DF	Hamizah Talib	2 June 1990 (age 36)	4	0	(Singapore) Geylang International	v. Cambodia, 5 June 2026
DF	Nurerwadah Erwan	26 June 2004 (age 22)	21	0	(Singapore) Lion City Sailors	v. Cambodia, 5 June 2026
DF	Nurhidayu Binte Naszri	16 March 2004 (age 22)	25	0	(Singapore) Lion City Sailors	Apr 26 Sabah Camp
DF	Khairunnisa Anwar	21 February 2003 (age 23)	14	0	(Singapore) Lion City Sailors	Apr 26 Sabah Camp
DF	Nurzaherra Maisarah	21 October 2006 (age 20)	1	0	(Singapore) Tiong Bahru FC	Apr 26 Sabah Camp
DF	Fathimah Shahremh	31 July 2003 (age 23)	0	0	(Singapore) Geylang International	Apr 26 Sabah Camp
DF	Sara Merican	9 April 1996 (age 30)	0	0	(Singapore) Albirex Jurong	Apr 26 Sabah Camp
DF	Angelyn Pang	13 April 1991 (age 35)	21	0	(Singapore) Hougang United	v. Thailand, 10 Dec 2026
DF	Elyssa Qistina	12 July 2005 (age 21)	2	0	(Singapore) Geylang International	v. Saudi Arabia, 29 Oct 2025
MF	Nasriah Ibrahim	1 September 2004 (age 22)	6	0	(Singapore) Geylang International	v. Cambodia, 5 June 2026
MF	Summer Chong	12 August 2004 (age 22)	0	0	(United States) Boston University	v. Cambodia, 5 June 2026
MF	Celine Koh Ying Xuan	5 May 2010 (age 16)	0	0	(Singapore) Lion City Sailors	v. Cambodia, 5 June 2026
MF	Nahwah Aidilreza	4 May 2007 (age 19)	0	0	(Singapore) BG Tampines Rovers	Apr 26 Sabah Camp
MF	Bhanu Krishnasamy	28 August 1995 (age 31)	0	0	(Singapore) Still Aerion	Apr 26 Sabah Camp
MF	Sitianiwati Rosielin	26 May 1997 (age 29)	32		(Singapore) Hougang United	v. Thailand, 10 Dec 2026
MF	Dorcas Chu	29 July 2002 (age 24)	21	3	(Singapore) Lion City Sailors	v. Thailand, 10 Dec 2026
MF	Sharifah Nur Amanina	8 January 2008 (age 18)	1	0	(Singapore) Balestier Khalsa	v. Thailand, 10 Dec 2026
MF	Siti Wan Nabilah	15 May 1993 (age 33)	8	0	(Singapore) Albirex Niigata (S)	v. Saudi Arabia, 29 Oct 2025
FW	Chloe Koh	18 February 2007 (age 19)	13	0	(United States) IMG Academy	v. Cambodia, 5 June 2026
FW	Nicole Lim	10 April 2002 (age 24)	10	1	(Singapore) Hougang United	v. Cambodia, 5 June 2026
FW	Liyana Rickit	14 October 2009 (age 17)	0	0	(Singapore) Geylang International	v. Cambodia, 5 June 2026
FW	Raudhah Kamis	4 March 1999 (age 27)	29	5	(Singapore) Hougang United	v. Thailand, 10 Dec 2026
FW	Cara Ming-Yan Chang	28 November 2008 (age 17)	11	1	(England) Ardingly College	v. Thailand, 10 Dec 2026

== Records ==
Players in bold are still active with Singapore.

=== Most appearances ===
As of 23 July 2026

Rank	Player	Caps	Goals	Position	Career
1	Ernie Sulastri Sontaril	58		DF	2010-2023
1	**Siti Rosnani Binte Azman**	58	2	DF	2012-present
3	**Farhanah Ruhaizat**	54	8	FW	2015-present
4	Noor Kusumawati Rosman	51	0	GK	2011-2023
5	**Syazwani Ruzi**	47	1	MF	2018-present
6	**Dhaniyah Qasimah**	43	0	DF	2018-present
6	**Lim Li Xian**	43	2	MF	2011-present

=== Top goalscorers ===
As of 23 July 2026

Rank	Player	Goals	Caps	Ratio	Career
**1**	**Danelle Tan**	14	32	0.36	2019-present
**2**	**Farhanah Ruhaizat**	8	54	0.15	2015-present
**3**	**Nur Izzati Bte Rosni**	5	30	0.15	2018-present
**4**	**Nur Sarah Zu’risqha**	4	16	0.25	2023-present
**4**	**Stephanie Dominguez**	4	34	0.12	2016-present

== Competitive record ==
=== FIFA Women's World Cup ===
FIFA Women's World Cup record
Year	Result	Matches	Wins	Draws	Losses	GF	GA
(China) 1991	Did not qualify						
(Sweden) 1995	Did not enter						
(United States) 1999	Did not enter						
(United States) 2003	Did not qualify						
(China) 2007	Did not qualify						
(Germany) 2011	Did not enter						
(Canada) 2015	Did not enter						
(France) 2019	Did not qualify						
(Australia) (New Zealand) 2023	Did not qualify						
(Brazil) 2027	Did not qualify						
(Costa Rica) (Jamaica) (Mexico) (United States) 2031	To be determined						
(United Kingdom) 2035	To be determined						
Total	0/12	—	—	—	—	—	—

=== Olympic Games ===
Summer Olympics										Qualification						
Year	Round	Position	GP	W	D*	L	GS	GA	GD	GP	W	D	L	GS	GA	GD
(United States) 1996	Did not qualify									No Qualification Tournament; teams selected by FIFA to take part						
(Australia) 2000	Did not qualify									No Qualification Tournament; teams selected by FIFA to take part						
(Greece) 2004	Did not qualify									3	0	0	3	0	15	−15
(China) 2008	Did not qualify									3	1	0	2	6	8	−2
(United Kingdom) 2012	Did not enter															
(Brazil) 2016	Did not enter															
(Japan) 2020	Did not qualify									4	0	1	3	2	27	−25
(France) 2024	Did not qualify															
(United States) 2028	Did not qualify															
(Australia) 2032	To be determined															
**Total**	**0/5**	—	**0**	**0**	**0**	**0**	**0**	**0**	**0**	**10**	**1**	**1**	**8**	**8**	**50**	**−42**

=== AFC Women's Asian Cup ===
AFC Women's Asian Cup									Qualification						
Year	Result	GP	W	D*	L	GS	GA	GD	GP	W	D	L	GS	GA	GD
(Hong Kong) 1975	Group stage	2	0	0	2	0	6	−6	No Qualification Tournament						
(Taiwan) 1977	**Third Place**	4	2	0	2	3	5	−2	No Qualification Tournament						
(India) 1980	Did not enter								No Qualification Tournament						
(Hong Kong) 1981	Group stage	3	1	0	2	4	7	−3	No Qualification Tournament						
(Thailand) 1983	Fourth Place	6	3	1	2	12	5	+7	No Qualification Tournament						
(Hong Kong) 1986 to (Hong Kong) 1989	Did not enter								No Qualification Tournament						
(Japan) 1991	Group stage	4	0	0	4	0	21	−21	No Qualification Tournament						
(Malaysia) 1993 to (Philippines) 1999	Did not enter								No Qualification Tournament						
(Chinese Taipei) 2001	Group stage	4	1	0	3	2	47	−45	No Qualification Tournament						
(Thailand) 2003	Group stage	4	0	0	4	0	24	−24	No Qualification Tournament						
(Australia) 2006	Did not qualify								3	0	1	2	0	7	−7
(Vietnam) 2008	Did not qualify								2	1	0	1	1	2	−1
(China) 2010 to (Vietnam) 2014	Did not enter								–	–	–	–	–	–	–
(Jordan) 2018	Did not qualify								4	1	0	3	1	20	−19
(India) 2022	Did not qualify								2	0	0	2	0	2	−2
(Australia) 2026	Did not qualify								4	0	0	4	2	13	−11
(Uzbekistan) 2029	To be determined														
**Total**	7/19	27	7	1	19	21	115	−94	15	2	1	12	4	44	−40

*Draws include knockout matches decided on penalty kicks.

=== Asian Games ===
Asian Games
Year	Result	Pld	W	D	L	GF	GA	GD
(India) 1951 to (South Korea) 1986	No competition							
(China) 1990 to (Indonesia) 2018	Did not enter							
(China) 2022	Group Stage	2	0	0	2	0	17	−17
(Japan) 2026	Did not qualify							
(Qatar) 2030	To be determined							
(Saudi Arabia) 2034	To be determined							
**Total**	1/9	2	0	0	2	0	17	−17

=== ASEAN Women's Championship ===
ASEAN Women's Championship
Year	Result	Pld	W	D*	L	GF	GA	GD
(Vietnam) 2004	Group stage	3	1	0	2	2	8	−6
(Vietnam) 2006	Did not enter							
(Myanmar) 2007	Group stage	3	0	0	3	1	14	−13
(Vietnam) 2008	Group stage	3	0	0	3	1	15	−14
(Laos) 2011	Group stage	3	0	0	3	2	17	−15
(Vietnam) 2012	Group stage	3	0	0	3	2	28	−26
(Myanmar) 2013	Did not enter							
(Vietnam) 2015	Did not enter							
(Myanmar) 2016	Group stage	3	0	0	3	0	24	−24
(Indonesia) 2018	Group stage	4	0	1	3	0	20	−20
(Thailand) 2019	Group stage	4	0	0	4	1	18	−17
(Philippines) 2022	Group stage	5	1	1	3	3	14	−11
(Vietnam) 2025	Qualified but withdrew							
2027	Qualified							
**Total**	10/14	31	2	2	27	12	158	−146

*Draws include knockout matches decided on penalty kicks.

=== AFF Women's Cup ===
AFF Women's Cup
Year	Result	Pld	W	D	L	GF	GA	GD
(Laos) 2024	**Third place**	4	2	1	1	3	4	−1
(Malaysia) 2026	**Third place**	4	1	2	1	5	5	0
**Total**		8	3	3	2	8	9	−1

=== Southeast Asian Games ===
Southeast Asian Games
Year	Result	Pld	W	D	L	GF	GA	GD
(Thailand) 1985	**Silver Medal**	3	1	0	1	2	6	−4
(Thailand) 1995	Fifth Place	4	0	0	4	1	9	−8
(Indonesia) 1997	Did not enter							
(Malaysia) 2001	Group stage	2	0	1	1	0	6	−6
(Vietnam) 2003	Group stage	2	0	0	3	0	5	−5
(Philippines) 2005	Did not enter							
(Thailand) 2007	Did not enter							
(Laos) 2009	Did not enter							
(Myanmar) 2013	Did not enter							
(Malaysia) 2017	Did not enter							
(Philippines) 2019	Did not enter							
(Vietnam) 2021	Group Stage	3	1	0	2	1	4	−3
(Cambodia) 2023	Group Stage	3	1	0	2	2	6	−4
(Thailand) 2025	Group Stage	2	0	0	2	1	5	−4
**Total**	7/14	19	3	1	14	7	41	−34

== Honours ==
Summary

Overview
Event	1st place	2nd place	3rd place	4th place
FIFA Women's World Cup	0	0	0	0
Summer Olympic Games	0	0	0	0
AFC Women's Asian Cup	0	0	1	1
Asian Games	0	0	0	0
ASEAN Women's Championship	0	0	0	0
AFF Women's Cup	0	0	2	0
SEA Games	0	1	0	0
Total	0	1	3	1

== See also ==
- Singapore women's national under-20 football team
- Sport in Singapore
- Football in Singapore
