= Felicia de Zeeuw =

Indonesian footballer (born 2006)

Personal information
- Full name: Felicia Victoria de Zeeuw
- Date of birth: 19 January 2006 (age 20)
- Place of birth: Delft, Netherlands
- Height: 1.70 m (5 ft 7 in)
- Position: Attacking midfielder

Team information
- Current team: NAC Breda

Youth career
- 2016–2020: DSVP
- 2021–2024: ADO Den Haag

Senior career*
Years	Team	Apps	(Gls)
2025–2026	ADO Den Haag	3	(0)
2026–	NAC Breda	0	(0)

International career^{‡}
2025–	Indonesia	14	(1)
- * Club domestic league appearances and goals ‡ National team caps and goals as of 5 July 2025

Felicia Victoria de Zeeuw (born 19 January 2006) is a professional footballer who plays as a midfielder for Vrouwen Eerste divisie club NAC Breda. Born in the Netherlands, she plays for the Indonesia national team.

== Early life ==
De Zeeuw was born in Delft, Netherlands. Zeeuw has Indonesian ancestry from her mother side. Her grandmother's was born in Jakarta.

== Youth & club career ==
De Zeeuw began her football career when she was 10 years old in DSVP for four seasons from 2016 to 2020.

In 2020, she moved to ADO Den Haag where she plays for its U14 until U19 teams from 2020 to 2024 and was promoted to the senior team the following years. On 12 February 2025, she made her senior debut in the Vrouwen Eredivisie coming in from substitutions in the 85th minutes against FC Twente.

== International career ==
De Zeeuw has opted to represent the Indonesia women's national team. She played for the Indonesia U20 team in some exhibition matches in Japan.

She was called up to the national team for the preparation for the upcoming 2026 AFC Women's Asian Cup qualification. She made her debut against Kyrgzystan women's national team in a 1–0 win.

=== International goals ===
As of match played 22 July 2026
Indonesia score listed first, score column indicates score after each Felicia goal

List of international goals scored by Felicia de Zeeuw
No.	Date	Venue	Opponent	Score	Result	Competition
1	22 July 2026	Kuala Lumpur Stadium, Kuala Lumpur, Malaysia	Laos	4–0	5–0	2026 AFF Women's Cup

== Personal life ==
De Zeeuw was born to a Dutch mother with Indonesia heritage, Natascha Bijkerk born in Enschede, and her father, Victor de Zeeuw, born in Voorburg. Her maternal grandmother, Felixia Kuhuwael, was born in Jakarta.

On 10 June 2025, alongside Iris de Rouw, Emily Nahon, & Isa Warps, De Zeeuw obtained Indonesian citizenship.

== Honours ==
Indonesia

- AFF Women's Cup: 2026

== See also ==
- List of Indonesia international footballers born outside Indonesia
