= Isa Warps =

Indonesian footballer (born 2005)

- Warps with Indonesia in 2025

Personal information
- Full name: Isa Guusje Warps
- Date of birth: 3 June 2005 (age 21)
- Place of birth: Veldhoven, Netherlands
- Height: 1.76 m (5 ft 9 in)
- Position: Right winger

Team information
- Current team: VfR Warbeyen
- Number: 22

Youth career
- 2014–2017: De Ball Schoppen
- 2017–2020: Eindhoven
- 2021–2022: RKSV Nuenen

Senior career*
| Years | Team | Apps | (Gls) |
| 2022–2024 | KRC Genk | 2 | (0) |
| 2024–2025 | NAC Breda | 1 | (0) |
| 2025–2026 | VfR Warbeyen | 16 | (2) |
| 2026– | Standard Liège | 0 | (0) |

International career^{‡}
| 2025– | Indonesia | 17 | (2) |
- * Club domestic league appearances and goals as of 5 October 2025 ‡ National team caps and goals as of 12 August 2025

Isa Guusje Warps (born 3 June 2005) is a professional footballer who plays as a right winger for Belgian Super League club Standard Liège (women). Born in the Netherlands, she represents Indonesia at international level.

== Early life ==
Warps was born in Veldhoven, Netherlands. She has Indonesian ancestry from her father side. Her grandmother's was born in Padang.

== Youth & club career ==
Warps started her football career at De Ball Schoppen Academy when she was 9 years old and spent three seasons from 2014 to 2017. In the 2017–18 season, she moved to FC Eindhoven and joined the club's youth team.

After spending two seasons since joining FC Eindhoven in the 2018–19 season, she moved to the RKSV Nuenen club and only lasted one season.

Then, in the 2022–23 season, Warps moved to play with the Belgian club KRC Genk Ladies and joined the senior team until the end of the 2023–24 season. In the 2024–25 season, she returned to the Netherlands and plays for NAC Breda.

== International career ==
Warps has opted to represent the Indonesia women's national team.

She was called up to the national team for the preparation for the 2026 AFC Women's Asian Cup qualification. On 29 June 2025, Warps made her debut and also scored her first goal against Kyrgyzstan in a 1–0 win.

== Personal life ==
Warps was born to a Dutch father with Indonesia heritage, Aschwin Warps born in Delft, and her mother, Irene van Ballegoij, born in Tilburg. Her paternal grandmother, Fhilhomena Rouschop, was born in Padang, West Sumatera.

On 10 June 2025, alongside Iris de Rouw, Emily Nahon, & Felicia de Zeeuw, Warps obtained Indonesian citizenship.

== Career statistics ==
=== International ===
As of match played 29 June 2025
Indonesia score listed first, score column indicates score after each Isa Warps goal

List of international goals scored by Isa Warps
| No. | Date | Venue | Opponent | Score | Result | Competition |
|---|---|---|---|---|---|---|
| 1 | 29 June 2025 | Indomilk Arena, Tangerang, Indonesia | Kyrgyzstan | 1–0 | 1–0 | 2026 AFC Women's Asian Cup qualification |
| 2 | 7 December 2025 | IPE Chonburi Stadium, Chonburi, Thailand | Singapore | 1–1 | 3–1 | 2025 SEA Games |

== Honours ==
Indonesia

- AFF Women's Cup: 2026

== See also ==
- List of Indonesia international footballers born outside Indonesia
