= PSSI Awards =

Indonesian football awards

The PSSI Awards are annual football awards presented by the Football Association of Indonesia (PSSI) to recognize players, match officials, organizations, development programs, supporters and other contributors to Indonesian football. The awards were first presented in 2026, marking the first awards ceremony organized by PSSI since its establishment 95 years earlier.

The inaugural ceremony was held on 28 March 2026 at Studio 6 Emtek City in Jakarta, with 17 awards presented across performance and special recognition categories. The awards recognize contributions to Indonesian football beyond players, including referees, provincial associations, grassroots programs, supporters and other personnel working in the sport.

== History ==
PSSI introduced the awards in 2026 as an annual recognition event for Indonesian football. The concept was introduced publicly at the Indonesia Sports Summit 2025, with the awards designed to recognize individual sporting performances and contributions to the wider development of Indonesian football.

The inaugural ceremony took place at Studio 6 Emtek City in West Jakarta on 28 March 2026. PSSI described the awards as a platform to recognize footballers, referees, provincial football associations, sponsors, communities and people involved in football development at the grassroots level.

The awards comprise performance-based categories and special recognition awards. The inaugural ceremony featured 17 categories, including nine performance awards and eight special recognition awards.

== Selection ==
The performance-based awards include public participation through a voting process. During the inaugural awards, voting took place from January to March 2026. Jay Idzes was selected as Men's Player of the Year after receiving more votes than Yakob Sayuri, Kevin Diks and Calvin Verdonk.

The evaluation also involved a panel consisting of people from different areas of Indonesian football, including active and former players and football journalists.

More than 790,000 votes were reportedly recorded during the inaugural voting period, which included online and offline participation.

== Performance awards ==
=== Men's Player of the Year ===
Year	Player	Club	Ref.
2026	Jay Idzes	(Italy) Sassuolo	

=== Women's Player of the Year ===
Year	Player	Club	Ref.
2026	Safira Ika	DKI Jakarta	

=== Men's Young Player of the Year ===
Year	Player	Club	Ref.
2026	Marselino Ferdinan	(Slovakia) Trenčín (on loan from (England) Oxford United)	

=== Women's Young Player of the Year ===
Year	Player	Club	Ref.
2026	Claudia Scheunemann	(Netherlands) Utrecht	

=== Men's Goalkeeper of the Year ===
Year	Player	Club	Ref.
2026	Maarten Paes	(Netherlands) Ajax	

=== Women's Goalkeeper of the Year ===
Year	Player	Club	Ref.
2026	Iris de Rouw	(United States) St. John's Red Storm	

=== Goal of the Year ===
Year	Player	For	Against	Competition	Date	Ref.
2026	Rizky Ridho	Persija Jakarta	Arema	2024–25 Liga 1	9 March 2025	

=== Save of the Year ===
Year	Player	For	Against	Competition	Date	Ref.
2026	Emil Audero	Indonesia	China	2026 FIFA World Cup qualification	5 June 2025	

=== Assist of the Year ===
Year	Player	For	Against	Competition	Date	Ref.
2026	Yance Sayuri	Malut United	Persis Solo	2024–25 Liga 1	12 April 2025	

== See also ==
- Football Association of Indonesia
- Indonesia national football team
- Indonesia women's national football team
- Liga 1 (Indonesia)
- Indonesian football
