= Claudia Scheunemann =

Indonesian footballer (born 2009)

- Scheunemann with Indonesia in 2024

Personal information
- Full name: Claudia Alexandra Scheunemann
- Date of birth: 24 April 2009 (age 17)
- Place of birth: Tangerang, Indonesia
- Height: 1.71 m (5 ft 7 in)
- Position: Forward

Team information
- Current team: Utrecht
- Number: 13

Youth career
- 2018–2024: Young Warrior FA
- 2024–2025: Hamburger SV

Senior career*
Years	Team	Apps	(Gls)
2025–	Utrecht	11	(2)
2025	Jong Utrecht	2	(2)

International career^{‡}
2024–	Indonesia U17	3	(1)
2022–	Indonesia U20	9	(6)
2023–	Indonesia	26	(9)
- * Club domestic league appearances and goals as of 15 September 2026 ‡ National team caps and goals as of 15 April 2026

Claudia Alexandra Scheunemann (born 24 April 2009) is an Indonesian professional footballer who plays as forward for Eredivisie club Utrecht and the Indonesia women's national team.

== Club career ==
Scheunemann signed a 3-year contract with Eredivisie club Utrecht.

== International career ==
Scheunemann first ever national team called up was at the age of 13, when she got called up to Indonesia under-20 for the 2022 AFF U-18 Championship. She managed to score a goal in her debut match on 22 July 2022 against Singapore U20.

On 8 April 2023, she made her debut for the senior team in 2024 Summer Olympic qualifiers against Lebanon, making her the youngest Indonesian women's international footballer of all time, at the age of 13 years and 349 days.

She also became the youngest goal scorer for the women's senior team at the age of 15 years and 34 days after scoring scoring a brace in a friendly match against Singapore on 28 May 2024.

In the 2024 AFF Women's Cup tournament, Scheunemann netted her fifth and sixth goals, with one goal scored against Malaysia and another against Singapore. At the age of just 15, she became the all-time leading goalscorer for the Indonesia women's national team.

== Personal life ==
Scheunemann was born in Indonesia and is of German descent through her father Ralph, who is the brother of former Indonesia women's national team head coach, Timo.

Her cousin Brandon is also a professional footballer, and plays for the Indonesia men's national under-23 team.

== Career statistics ==
=== International ===
As of match played 12 May 2024

Appearances and goals by national team and year
National team	Year	Apps	Goals
Indonesia U17	2024	3	1
Total		3	1

List of international under-17 goals scored by Claudia Scheunemann
No.	Date	Venue	Opponent	Score	Result	Competition
1.	6 May 2024	Kapten I Wayan Dipta Stadium, Gianyar, Indonesia	Philippines	1–1	1–6	2024 AFC U-17 Women's Asian Cup

As of match played 15 July 2023

Appearances and goals by national team and year
National team	Year	Apps	Goals
Indonesia U20	2022	4	1
Indonesia U20	2023	5	5
Total		9	6

List of international under-20 goals scored by Claudia Scheunemann
No.	Date	Venue	Opponent	Score	Result	Competition
1.	22 July 2022	Gelora Sriwijaya Stadium, Palembang, Indonesia	Singapore	1–0	1–0	2022 AFF U-18 Women's Championship
2.	5 July 2023	Gelora Sriwijaya Stadium, Palembang, Indonesia	Timor-Leste	2–0	7–0	2023 AFF U-19 Women's Championship
3.	7 July 2023	Gelora Sriwijaya Stadium, Palembang, Indonesia	Laos	2–1	4–1	2023 AFF U-19 Women's Championship
4.	7 July 2023	Gelora Sriwijaya Stadium, Palembang, Indonesia	Laos	3–1	4–1	2023 AFF U-19 Women's Championship
5.	9 July 2023	Gelora Sriwijaya Stadium, Palembang, Indonesia	Cambodia	1–0	5–0	2023 AFF U-19 Women's Championship
6.	13 July 2023	Gelora Sriwijaya Stadium, Palembang, Indonesia	Thailand	1–1	1–7	2023 AFF U-19 Women's Championship

As of match played 12 April 2026

Appearances and goals by national team and year
National team	Year	Apps	Goals
Indonesia	2023	2	0
Indonesia	2024	10	6
Indonesia	2025	9	1
Indonesia	2026	2	2
Total		23	9

List of international goals scored by Claudia Scheunemann
No.	Date	Venue	Opponent	Score	Result	Competition
1.	28 May 2024	Madya Stadium, Jakarta, Indonesia	Singapore	2–1	5–1	Friendly
2.	28 May 2024	Madya Stadium, Jakarta, Indonesia	Singapore	4–1	5–1	Friendly
3.	8 June 2024	Al Ahli Stadium, Manama, Bahrain	Bahrain	3–0	3–2	Friendly
4.	11 June 2024	Al Ahli Stadium, Manama, Bahrain	Bahrain	1–0	3–0	Friendly
5.	26 November 2024	New Laos National Stadium, Vientiane, Laos	Malaysia	1–0	1–0	2024 AFF Women's Cup
6.	2 December 2024	New Laos National Stadium, Vientiane, Laos	Singapore	1–0	3–0	2024 AFF Women's Cup
7.	7 December 2025	IPE Chonburi Stadium, Chonburi, Thailand	Singapore	2–1	3–1	2025 SEA Games
8.	12 April 2026	Ratchaburi Stadium, Ratchaburi, Thailand	DR Congo	1–0	1–7	2026 FIFA Series
9.	15 April 2026	Ratchaburi Stadium, Ratchaburi, Thailand	New Caledonia	4–0	4–2	2026 FIFA Series

== Honours ==
Indonesia

- AFF Women's Cup: 2024

Individual

- AFF U-19 Women's Championship Best Player: 2023
- AFF U-19 Women's Championship Top Goalscorer: 2023
- PSSI Awards Women's Young Player of the Year: 2026
