= Katarina Stalin =

Indonesian-American footballer (born 2009)

Personal information
- Full name: Katarina Matilda Putri Stalin
- Date of birth: 20 February 2009 (age 17)
- Place of birth: San Diego, California, U.S.
- Height: 1.70 m (5 ft 7 in)
- Position: Attacking midfielder

Team information
- Current team: Kansas City Athletics

Youth career
- 2012–201?: Katy Youth SC
- 201?–2016: Albion Hurricanes ECNL
- 2016–2017: Washington Timbers
- 2017–: Sporting Blue Valley - KCA

International career^{‡}
| Years | Team | Apps | (Gls) |
| 2025– | Indonesia U17 | 1 | (1) |
| 2024– | Indonesia | 11 | (0) |
- ‡ National team caps and goals as of 13 October 2025

Katarina Matilda Putri Stalin (born 1 February 2009) is a footballer who plays as an attacking midfielder for Elite Clubs National League club Sporting Blue Valley. Born in the United States, she represents Indonesia at international level.

== Early life and youth career ==
Katarina Matilda Putri Stalin was born on February 20, 2009, in San Diego, California, United States. She is half-Indonesian through her mother who was born and raised in Jakarta, Indonesia. Her paternal grandparents have Swedish ancestry. She was interested in playing soccer since the age of 3, which then led her to sign up for Katy Youth SC, a youth soccer developmental team in 2010.

After she moved to Washington in 2016, she joined its local youth team, Washington Timbers and played there for one year. Subsequently, in the next year, she moved again to Kansas and played for the Elite Clubs National League (ECNL) club, Sporting Blue Valley.

== International career ==
Born in the United States, Stalin decided to represent Indonesia at the international level. On July 5, 2024, the Secretary General of the Football Association of Indonesia (PSSI), Yunus Nusi, announced that Stalin had obtained an Indonesian passport so she did not need a naturalization process.

On 14 July 2024, Stalin made her debut for the national team at the age of 15 in a friendly match against Hong Kong. She came on as a substitute in the 45th minute, replacing another debutant Sydney Hopper.

== Personal life ==
Her father is a former college soccer player who played as a centre-back. She is a lifelong fan of the Premier League club Liverpool. Her career has been greatly inspired by Lindsey Horan, an international women's soccer player from the United States.

== Career statistics ==
=== International ===
As of match played 5 December 2024

Appearances and goals by national team and year
| National team | Year | Apps | Goals |
|---|---|---|---|
| Indonesia | 2024 | 5 | 0 |
| Total | | 5 | 0 |

== Honors ==
Indonesia

- AFF Women's Cup: 2024, 2026

== See also ==
- List of Indonesia international footballers born outside Indonesia
