= Indonesia women's national football team =

Indonesia
- Nickname: Garuda Pertiwi
- Association: PSSI (Football Association of Indonesia)
- Confederation: AFC (Asia)
- Sub-confederation: AFF (Southeast Asia)
- Head coach: Alen Stajcic
- Captain: Viny Silfianus
- Most caps: Safira Ika (47)
- Top scorer: Claudia Scheunemann (9)
- Home stadium: Various
- FIFA code: IDN
First colours	Second colours

FIFA ranking
- Current: 105 ▲5 (20 October 2026)
- Highest: 58 (July 2003)
- Lowest: 110 (June 2026)

First international
- Taiwan 5–0 Indonesia (Taipei, Republic of China; 2 August 1977)

Biggest win
- Indonesia 8–0 Nepal (Mong Kok, Hong Kong; 22 December 1989)

Biggest defeat
- Australia 18–0 Indonesia (Mumbai, India; 21 January 2022)

Asian Cup
- Appearances: 5 (first in 1977)
- Best result: Fourth place (1977, 1986)

ASEAN Championship
- Appearances: 9 (first in 2004)
- Best result: Fourth place (2004)

AFF Women's Cup
- Appearances: 2 (first in 2024)
- Best result: Champions (2024, 2026)

Asian Games
- Appearances: 1 (first in 2018)
- Best result: Group stage (2018)
Medal record
AFF Women's Cup
Gold medal – first place	2024 Laos	Team
Gold medal – first place	2026 Malaysia	Team
- Website: PSSI.org

The Indonesia women's national football team (Indonesian: Tim nasional sepak bola wanita Indonesia) represents Indonesia in international women's football, and is managed by the Football Association of Indonesia (PSSI), the sport's governing body in the country.

The Indonesian women's national football team was founded in 1975 and has participated five times in the AFC Women's Asian Cup, achieving the fourth place position twice since their inaugural appearance in 1977, when the event was referred to as the AFC Women's Championship. The team took a break from the continental competition after their participation in 1989. Following the AFC's introduction of a qualification process starting from the 2006 edition, Indonesia successfully returned to the AFC Women's Asian Cup in 2022, having qualified the previous year, although they experienced their worst performance in the final tournament's history, losing all their matches and failing to score a single goal.

From July to October 2003, the team reached their highest ranking to date, securing the 58th position in the FIFA Women's World Ranking.

== History ==
=== Early years ===
The Indonesia women's national football team was established in 1975 by the Football Association of Indonesia (PSSI). Nevertheless, the team did not make its competitive debut until two years later, participating in the 1977 AFC Women's Championship, where they suffered a 0–5 defeat in their opening match against the Republic of China. Despite suffering a challenging loss in the first match of the tournament, Indonesia successfully progressed to the semifinals following a narrow 1–0 win over Japan in the second match. The sole goal of the game was netted by Lantang in the 20th minute, marking her as the first goal scorer for the Indonesian women's national team. At the conclusion of the tournament, Indonesia secured the fourth position, marking the highest achievement for the Indonesia women's national team in the Asian competition. This accomplishment was matched nine years later during the 1986 AFC Women's Championship.

Indonesia participated in the Asian Cup for the fourth time during the 1989 edition.The team was assigned to Group B, alongside Japan, Hong Kong, and Nepal. Despite being eliminated in the group stage, Indonesia achieved its largest victory in history by defeating Nepal 8–0 in this tournament on 22 December 1989, at Mong Kok Stadium in Hong Kong.

=== Modern era ===
In 2021, Indonesia secured a place in the 2022 AFC Women's Asian Cup for the first time since 1989, marking a 33-year absence. However, during the final tournament, Indonesia was unable to win any matches, failing to score a single goal. Notably, one of the losses was a staggering 0–18 against Australia, which stands as the nation's most significant defeat in history.

On 20 February 2024, PSSI appointed Satoru Mochizuki as the new head coach of the national team. Previously, Mochizuki held the position of assistant coach for the Japan women's national football team from 2008 to 2012, during which he contributed to the team's triumph in the 2011 FIFA Women's World Cup. Indonesia's first match with Mochizuki was in a friendly match against Singapore on 28 May 2024 that ends in a huge 5–1 victory for the Garuda Pertiwi.

Under Mochizuki, the team participated in the annual 2024 AFF Women's Cup, which also served as the qualification for the 2025 ASEAN Women's Championship, Indonesia managed to win their first maiden trophy in history, by beating Cambodia 3–1 in the final. Then in the 2026 AFF Women's Cup, which also served as the qualification for the 2027 ASEAN Women's Championship, Indonesia beat Laos 5–0 in the final to become the first team to win back-to-back titles in the AFF Women's Cup.

== Team image ==
=== Nicknames ===
The Indonesia women's national football team has been known or nicknamed as the "Garuda Pertiwi". The name is derived from two words: "Garuda," which is taken from Indonesia's national emblem, Garuda Pancasila, and is also a nickname for the men's team; and "Pertiwi," which signifies Ibu Pertiwi (English: Mother Prithvi or Mother Earth), a national personification of Indonesia that symbolizes the concept of Tanah Air (English: land and water), representing the Indonesian motherland.

=== Colors ===
Kelme is the national team's kit provider, a sponsorship that began in 2026 and is contracted to continue until at least 2030. Previously the team's kit was supplied by Nike, Mills and Erspo. Indonesia also wears other apparel, only when they compete in international sports events such as the Asian Games and the SEA Games. In those events Indonesia wears Li-Ning, this is due to the Asian Games and SEA Games being multi-sports events all of whose contingents are under the Indonesian National Olympic Committee (NOC).

=== Home stadium ===
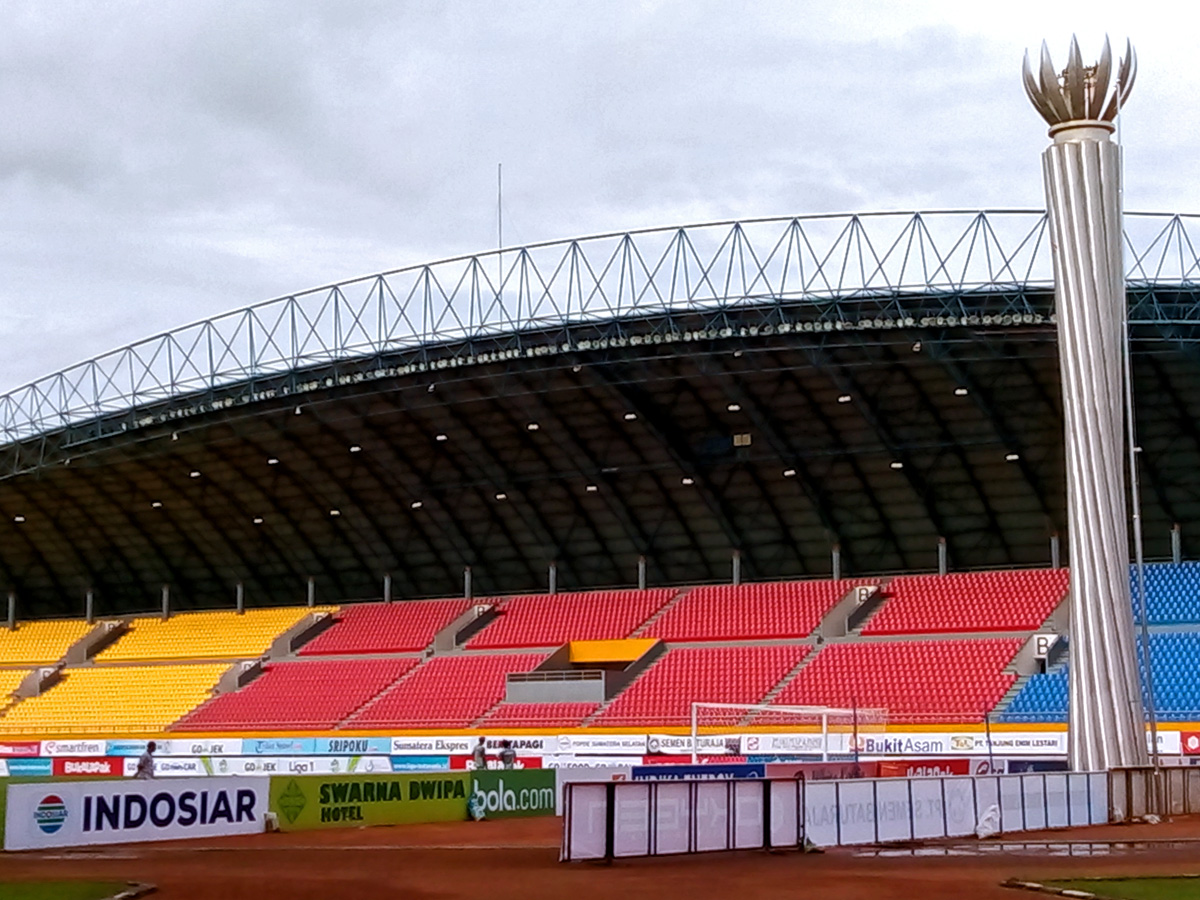
Gelora Sriwijaya Stadium

Indonesia plays its home matches at Gelora Sriwijaya Stadium in Palembang. They first established their base there when they hosted the 2018 AFF Women's Championship.

== Results and fixtures ==
The following is a list of match results in the last 12 months, as well as any future matches that have been scheduled.

Win Draw Loss Fixture

=== 2025 ===
26 November Friendly	Indonesia	2–1	Nepal	Yogyakarta, Indonesia
19:30 UTC+7	Gea 58'; Aulia 67'	Report	Vivi 20' (o.g.)	Stadium: Maguwoharjo Stadium

29 November Friendly	Indonesia	0–5	Chinese Taipei	Yogyakarta, Indonesia
19:30 UTC+7		Report	Nottet 35' (o.g.); Pu Hsin-hui 42'; Gea 70' (o.g.); Chen Yu-chin 75'; Hsu Yi-yun 87'	Stadium: Maguwoharjo Stadium

4 December 2025 SEA Games	Thailand	8–0	Indonesia	Chonburi, Thailand
18:30 UTC+7	Yumanda 8' (o.g.); Pattaranan 21'; Silawan 27'; Saowalak 44'; Jiraporn 50' (pen.), 52' (pen.), 59'; Panittha 55'	Report		Stadium: Chonburi Stadium; Referee: Azusa Sugino (Japan)

7 December 2025 SEA Games	Singapore	1–3	Indonesia	Chonburi, Thailand
16:00 UTC+7	Ruhaizat 22'	Report	Warps 31'; Scheunemann 62'; Aulia 90+5'	Stadium: IPE Chonburi Stadium; Referee: Esra'a Almbaidin (Jordan)

14 December 2025 SEA Games SF	Vietnam	5–0	Indonesia	Chonburi, Thailand
16:00 UTC+7	Nguyễn Thị Bích Thùy 28' (pen.), 80'; Phạm Hải Yến 49', 58'; Huỳnh Như 86'	Report		Stadium: IPE Chonburi Stadium; Referee: Alesar Baddour (Syria)

17 December 2025 SEA Games 3rd	Thailand	2–0	Indonesia	Chonburi, Thailand
15:30 UTC+7	Pitsamai 17'; Pattaranan 43'	Report		Stadium: IPE Chonburi Stadium; Referee: Gulshoda Saitkulova (Uzbekistan)

=== 2026 ===
12 April 2026 FIFA Series	Indonesia	1–7	DR Congo	Ratchaburi, Thailand
16:00 UTC+7	Scheunemann 7' (pen.)	Report (FIFA)	Kanjinga 23', 59'; Mawete 29', 74'; Kasaj 45+6'; Massombo 52'; Feza 82'	Stadium: Ratchaburi Stadium; Referee: Pansa Chaisanit (Thailand)

15 April 2026 FIFA Series	New Caledonia	2–4	Indonesia	Ratchaburi, Thailand
16:00 UTC+7	Honakoko 61'; Hmae 80'	Report (FIFA)	Nahon 19'; Imut 28', 53'; Scheunemann 59'	Stadium: Ratchaburi Stadium; Referee: Sunita Thongthawin (Thailand)

3 June Friendly	Indonesia	0–2	Singapore	Bandung, Indonesia
19:00 UTC+7			Danelle Tan 10'; Nicole Lim 22'	Stadium: Arcamanik Stadium

9 June Friendly	Indonesia	1–1	Cambodia	Bandung, Indonesia
15:30 UTC+7	Rosdilah 54'	Report	Sapheourn 55'	Stadium: Arcamanik Stadium

10 July 2026 AFF Women's Cup GS	Timor-Leste	0–2	Indonesia	Kuala Lumpur, Malaysia
16:45 UTC+8		Report	Nahon 5'; Loupatty 28'	Stadium: Kuala Lumpur Stadium; Referee: Pansa Chaisanit (Thailand)

16 July 2026 AFF Women's Cup GS	Indonesia	1–1	Cambodia	Shah Alam, Malaysia
16:45 UTC+8	Sheva 40'	Report	Serysitha 47'	Stadium: UiTM Stadium; Referee: Asaka Koizumi (Japan)

19 July 2026 AFF Women's Cup SF	Singapore	0–2	Indonesia	Kuala Lumpur, Malaysia
20:45 UTC+8		Report	Gea 68'; Remini 80'	Stadium: Kuala Lumpur Stadium; Referee: Asaka Koizumi (Japan)

22 July 2026 AFF Women's Cup Final	Laos	0–5	Indonesia	Kuala Lumpur, Malaysia
20:45 UTC+8		Report	Hopper 33'; Nottet 48'; Loupatty 55'; De Zeeuw 68'; Nahon 84'	Stadium: Kuala Lumpur Stadium; Referee: Asaka Koizumi (Japan)

10 October Friendly	Indonesia	0–0	Armenia	Amman, Jordan
18:00 UTC+3				Stadium: Al-Aqaba Stadium

13 October Friendly	Jordan	0–0	Indonesia	Amman, Jordan
18:00 UTC+3				Stadium: Al-Aqaba Stadium

29 November Friendly	Indonesia	v	Bhutan	Kudus, Indonesia
--:-- UTC+7				Stadium: Super Soccer Arena

2 December Friendly	Indonesia	v	Bhutan	Kudus, Indonesia
--:-- UTC+7				Stadium: Super Soccer Arena

== Coaching staff ==
Position	Name
Technical director	Alexander Zwiers
Head of Scouting	(Netherlands) Simon Tahamata
Head of Education	(England) Alistair Smith
Head coach	(Australia) Alen Stajcic
Assistant coaches	Nahuel Arrarte
Assistant coaches	Tia Darti Septiawati
Assistant coaches	Maulina Novryliani
Goalkeeping coach	Mukti Ali Raja
Performance & Physical coaches	Kartono Pramdhan
Video Analyst	Octavery Krisnandana
Sport scientist	(Indonesia) Valdano Wiriawanputra
Doctors	Leksolie Lirodon Foes
Doctors	Risky Dwi Rahayu
Physiotherapists	Lala
Physiotherapists	Lulu Indah Prawira
Sport dietician & nutritionist	(Indonesia) Emilia Achmadi
Administrator	(Canada) Maeve Glass
Operations manager	(Indonesia) Ashfi Qamara
Kit manager	(England) Ronnie Barrie (Indonesia) Hasan Mughni
Technical advisor	(Netherlands) Jordi Cruyff

=== Coaching history ===
Updated on 22 July 2026, after the match against Laos.

Coach	Coaching period	Pld	W	D	L	Tournament
Unknown	1977	3	1	0	2	1977 AFC Women's Championship – Fourth Place
Unknown	1981–1982	7	2	0	5	1981 AFC Women's Championship – Group stage 1982 ASEAN Women's Championship – (silver) Runner-up
(Indonesia) Muhardi	1985–1986	10	5	0	5	1985 ASEAN Women's Championship – (silver) Runner-up; 1986 AFC Women's Championship – Fourth Place
(Indonesia) Uan Hermawan	1989	3	1	1	1	1989 AFC Women's Championship – Group stage
(Indonesia) Muhardi	1997	4	0	2	2	1997 SEA Games – Fourth Place
(Indonesia) Muhardi	2001	4	1	0	3	2001 SEA Games – Fourth Place
(Japan) Ichiro Fujita	2003	6	0	2	4	2003 Four Nations Tournament – Fourth Place; 2003 SEA Games – Group stage
(Indonesia) Yusuf Bachtiar	2004–2005	11	1	1	9	2004 AFF Women's Championship – Fourth place 2006 AFC Women's Asian Cup qualification – Did not qualify 2005 SEA Games – Group stage
(Indonesia) Henky Yan Rumere	2007	3	1	0	2	2007 AFF Women's Championship – Group stage
(Germany) Timo Scheunemann	2008–2009	6	2	0	4	2008 AFF Women's Championship – Group stage 2009 Lady Mamie Ngan Memorial Cup – (bronze) Third Place
(Indonesia) Bambang Nurdiansyah	2010–2011	4	1	0	3	2011 AFF Women's Championship – Group stage
(Indonesia) Israqul Isa Subroto (Indonesia) Hendra Nasir	2013	4	0	0	4	2013 AFF Women's Championship – Group stage
(Indonesia) Rully Nere	2015	3	0	0	3	2015 AFF Women's Championship – Group stage
(Indonesia) Satia Bagdja Ijatna	2018	7	1	2	4	2018 AFF Women's Championship – Group stage 2018 Asian Games – Group stage
(Indonesia) Rully Nere	2018–2020	6	1	2	3	2020 AFC Women's Olympic Qualifying Tournament – Second round Group stage 2018 FAS Women's International Quadrangular – Fourth Place
(Indonesia) Rudy Eka Priyambada	2021–2023	15	4	2	9	2022 AFC Women's Asian Cup – Group stage 2022 AFF Women's Championship – Group stage 2024 AFC Women's Olympic Qualifying Tournament – First round Group stage
(Japan) Satoru Mochizuki	2024–2025	14	8	3	3	2024 AFF Women's Cup – (gold) Winner
(Indonesia) Joko Susilo (interim)	2025	3	0	1	2	2025 ASEAN Women's Championship – Group stage
(Japan) Akira Higashiyama (interim)	2025–2026	6	2	0	4	2025 SEA Games – Fourth Place
(Japan) Satoru Mochizuki	2026	8	4	2	2	2026 AFF Women's Cup – (gold) Winner
(Australia) Alen Stajcic	2026–	0	0	0	0	

== Players ==
=== Current squad ===
The following 25 players were called up for two international friendly match against Bhutan on 29 November and 2 December 2026, respectively.

Caps and goals are corrected as of 13 October 2026, after the match against Jordan.

No.	Pos.	Player	Date of birth (age)	Caps	Goals	Club
	GK	Laita Masykuroh	19 October 1999 (age 27)	17	0	(Football Association of Indonesia) Dewa United Banten
	GK	Iris de Rouw	21 April 2005 (age 21)	12	0	(United States Soccer Federation) St. John's Red Storm
	GK	Alleana Ayu Arumy	26 February 2010 (age 16)	0	0	(Football Association of Indonesia) Persita Tangerang
	DF	Safira Ika	21 April 2003 (age 23)	47	1	(Football Association of Indonesia) Dewa United Banten
	DF	Vivi Oktavia	7 March 1997 (age 29)	42	2	(Football Association of Indonesia) Persija Jakarta
	DF	Gea Yumanda	27 June 2006 (age 20)	29	2	(Football Association of Indonesia) Persikad Depok
	DF	Remini Rumbewas	9 October 2000 (age 26)	26	2	(Football Association of Indonesia) Garudayaksa
	DF	Emily Nahon	17 May 2007 (age 19)	17	3	(United States Soccer Federation) Little Rock Trojans
	DF	Pauline van de Pol	12 March 2003 (age 23)	8	0	(Royal Dutch Football Association) Groningen
	DF	Isabel Kopp	19 February 2002 (age 24)	3	0	(Royal Dutch Football Association) Hera United
	DF	Jazlyn Kayla	26 August 2010 (age 16)	0	0	(Football Association of Indonesia) Persikad Depok
	MF	Helsya Maeisyaroh	7 May 2005 (age 21)	40	2	(Football Association of Indonesia) Dewa United Banten
	MF	Viny Silfianus (captain)	3 July 2002 (age 24)	34	0	(Football Association of Indonesia) Persikad Depok
	MF	Rosdilah Nurrohmah	3 October 1999 (age 27)	28	2	(Football Association of Indonesia) Persikad Depok
	MF	Felicia de Zeeuw	19 January 2006 (age 20)	16	1	(Royal Dutch Football Association) NAC Breda
	MF	Katarina Stalin	1 February 2009 (age 17)	11	0	(United States Soccer Federation) Kansas City Athletics
	MF	Nafeeza Nori	11 March 2011 (age 15)	2	0	(Football Association of Indonesia) Persija Jakarta
	FW	Sheva Imut	20 April 2004 (age 22)	37	5	(Football Association of Indonesia) Dewa United Banten
	FW	Marsela Awi	10 May 2003 (age 23)	33	4	(Football Association of Indonesia) Garudayaksa
	FW	Claudia Scheunemann	24 April 2009 (age 17)	26	9	(Royal Dutch Football Association) Utrecht
	FW	Estella Loupatty	14 November 2003 (age 23)	20	2	(Football Association of Indonesia) Dewa United Banten
	FW	Isabelle Nottet	6 March 2003 (age 23)	9	1	(Football Association of Indonesia) Persikad Depok
	FW	Aulia Mabruroh	25 January 2005 (age 21)	7	2	(Football Association of Indonesia) Bekasi City
	FW	Ajeng Sri Handayani	13 December 2006 (age 19)	4	0	(Football Association of Indonesia) Persija Jakarta
	FW	Ayunda Dwi Anggraini	15 January 2006 (age 20)	1	0	(Football Association of Indonesia) Persita Tangerang

=== Recent call-ups ===
The following players have also been called up to the squad within the last 12 months.

Pos.	Player	Date of birth (age)	Caps	Goals	Club	Latest call-up
GK	Shesilia Desrina	7 December 2007 (age 18)	0	0	(Indonesia) Persikad Depok	v. Jordan, 13 October 2026
GK	Edelweiz Auradiva	9 March 2009 (age 17)	0	0	(Indonesia) Persija Jakarta	v. Jordan, 13 October 2026
GK	Gadhiza Asnanza	3 March 2008 (age 18)	0	0	(Indonesia) Persita Tangerang	v. Cambodia, 9 June 2026
GK	Thasza Amelia	1 January 2001 (age 25)	1	0	(Indonesia) Bekasi City	2025 ASEAN Women's Championship
GK	Indri Yulianti	30 November 2001 (age 24)	1	0	(Indonesia) Bekasi City	2025 ASEAN Women's Championship
DF	Nabila Divany	22 October 2007 (age 19)	2	0	(Indonesia) Dewa United Banten	v. Jordan, 13 October 2026
DF	Allya Afianti	8 January 2008 (age 18)	3	0	(Indonesia) Bekasi City	2026 AFF Women's Cup
DF	Noa Leatomu	7 November 2003 (age 23)	2	0	(Germany) Borussia Mönchengladbach	v. Cambodia, 9 June 2026
DF	Zahra Muzdalifah	4 April 2001 (age 25)	37	4	(Indonesia) Dewa United Banten	2025 SEA Games
DF	Nabila Saputri	4 February 2007 (age 19)	1	0	(Indonesia) Persija Jakarta	v. Chinese Taipei, 29 November 2025^{PRE}
DF	Shalika Aurelia	1 August 2003 (age 23)	15	0	(Australia) UWA Nedlands	2025 ASEAN Women's Championship
DF	Agnes Hutapea	14 August 2000 (age 26)	12	0	(Indonesia) Garudayaksa	2025 ASEAN Women's Championship
DF	Feni Binsbarek	18 January 2005 (age 21)	5	0	(Indonesia) Garudayaksa	2025 ASEAN Women's Championship
DF	Rihla Nuer	30 May 2002 (age 24)	4	0	(Maldives) Odi Sports Club	2025 ASEAN Women's Championship
DF	Siti Nuriyah	29 October 2001 (age 25)	2	0	(Indonesia) Garudayaksa	2025 ASEAN Women's Championship
DF	Amelia Heselo	3 June 2007 (age 19)	0	0	(Indonesia) Garudayaksa	2026 AFC Women's Asian Cup qualification^{PRE}
DF	Marcelinda Khusna	15 March 2006 (age 20)	0	0	(Indonesia) Persita Tangerang	2026 AFC Women's Asian Cup qualification^{PRE}
MF	Nasywa Rambe	1 January 2008 (age 18)	1	0	(Indonesia) Persija Jakarta	v. Jordan, 13 October 2026
MF	Sydney Hopper	15 March 2007 (age 19)	12	2	(United States) Dallas Baptist Patriots	2026 AFF Women's Cup
MF	Aulia Arifah	21 March 2008 (age 18)	0	0	(Indonesia) Bekasi City	v. Cambodia, 9 June 2026
MF	Shifana Nadhifa	28 March 2010 (age 16)	2	0	(Indonesia) Persija Jakarta	v. New Caledonia, 15 April 2026
MF	Syafia Chorlienka	25 October 2009 (age 17)	2	0	(Indonesia) Persikad Depok	v. Chinese Taipei, 29 November 2025^{PRE}
MF	Armelia Sava	6 June 2007 (age 19)	0	0	(Indonesia) Asprov Jatim	v. Chinese Taipei, 29 November 2025^{PRE}
MF	Liza Madari		0	0	(Indonesia) Toli	v. Chinese Taipei, 29 November 2025^{PRE}
MF	Octavianti Dwi	25 October 1998 (age 28)	26	3	(Indonesia) Garudayaksa	2025 ASEAN Women's Championship
MF	Rosalia	15 May 2004 (age 22)	0	0	(Indonesia) Bekasi City	2025 ASEAN Women's Championship
MF	Widja Malebbi		2	0	(Indonesia) Asprov Sulsel	2025 ASEAN Women's Championship
MF	Amanda Florentinae	28 November 1999 (age 26)	4	0	(Indonesia) Asprov Kalteng	2025 ASEAN Women's Championship
FW	Reva Octaviani	8 October 2003 (age 23)	35	5	(Malaysia) Kelana United	v. Jordan, 13 October 2026
FW	Isa Warps	6 March 2005 (age 21)	17	2	(Belgium) Standard Fémina	v. Jordan, 13 October 2026
FW	Diva Aulia Putri	25 November 2010 (age 15)	0	0	(Indonesia) Asprov Jatim	v. Chinese Taipei, 29 December 2025^{PRE}
FW	Nasywa Salsabila	13 October 2009 (age 17)	0	0	(Indonesia) Persikad Depok	2026 AFC Women's Asian Cup qualification
MF	Jezlyn Kayla	26 August 2010 (age 16)	0	0	(Indonesia) Roket	2026 AFC Women's Asian Cup qualification^{PRE}
Notes: ^{PRE} = Preliminary squad; ^{SUS} = Suspended; ^{INJ} = Withdrew from the roster due to an injury; ^{UNF} = Withdrew from the roster due to unfit condition; ^{RET} = Retired from the national team; ^{WD} = Withdrew from the roster for non-injury related reasons

=== Previous squads ===
AFC Women's Asian Cup

- 2022 AFC Women's Asian Cup squads

Asian Games

- 2018 Asian Games squads

ASEAN Women's Championship

- 2025 ASEAN Women's Championship squads
- 2022 AFF Women's Championship squads
- 2018 AFF Women's Championship squads
- 2015 AFF Women's Championship squads
- 2013 AFF Women's Championship squads

SEA Games

- 2025 SEA Games squads
- 2019 SEA Games squads

=== Notable players ===
- Lantang (1977)
- Muthia Datau (1977–1980)
- Papat Yunisal (1980–1989)
- Dorce Upuya (1981)
- Yuri Maryati (1982–1986)
- Tiktik (1985)
- Atmini (1985–1986)
- Elan Kaligis (1986)
- Iin Parbo (1986)
- Rosita Pella (1986)
- Rukijah (1986)
- Titas Susiana (1986)
- Nelce Libak (1989)
- Gusriwati (2001–2005)
- Jenny Merlin Yansip (2001–2005)
- Marion Pakage (2001–2005)
- Yakomina Swabra (2001–2005)
- Wiwin Yuniggishi (2004)
- Tugiyati Cindy (2011–2013)

== Individual records ==
As of 11 October 2026

*Players in bold are still active, at least at club level.

=== Most appearances ===
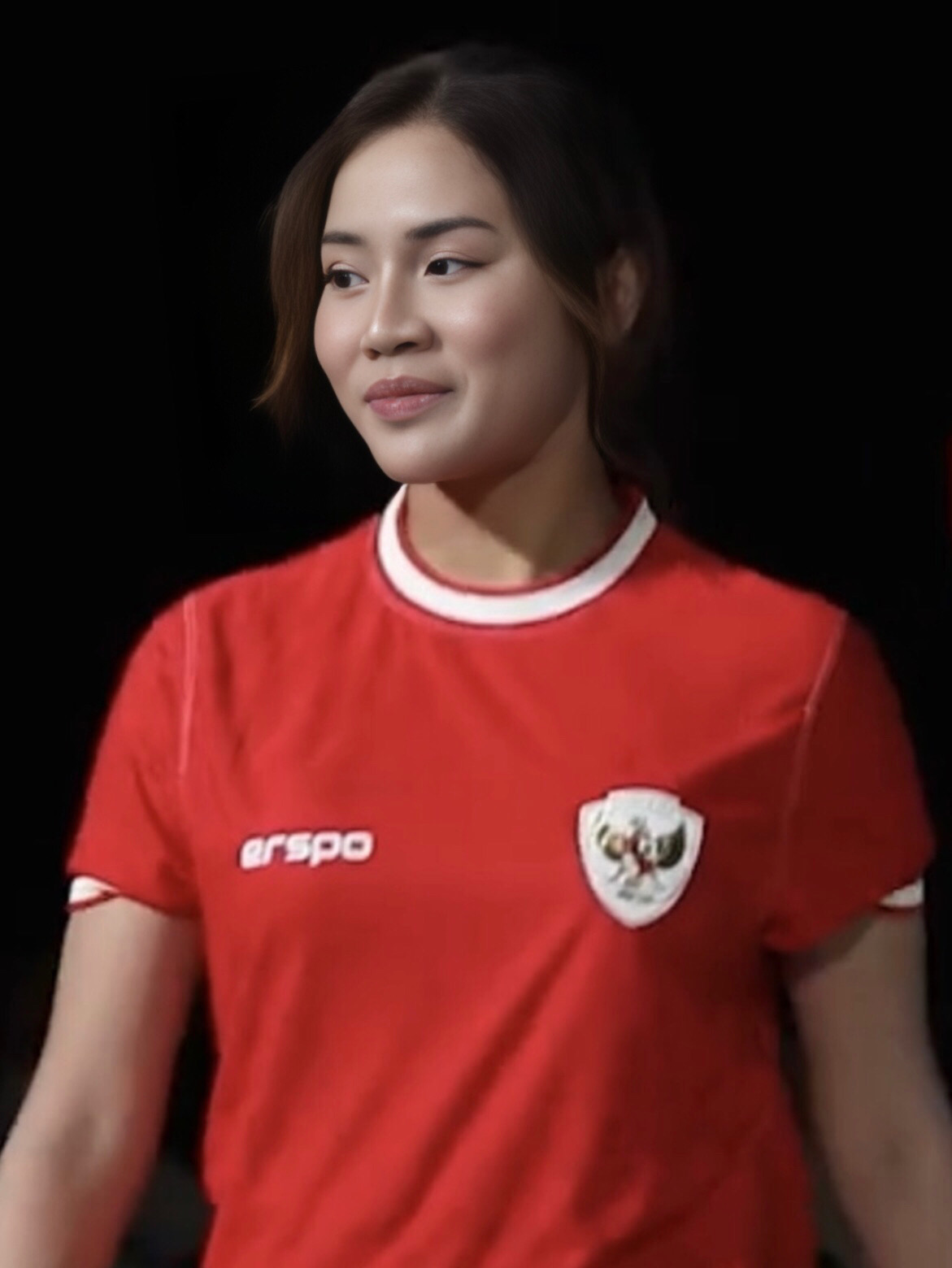
Safira Ika is Indonesia's most capped player with 44 appearances

Rank	Player	Caps	Goals	Career
1	Safira Ika	47	1	2018–present
2	Vivi Oktavia	42	2	2018–present
3	Helsya Maeisyaroh	40	2	2019–present
4	Zahra Muzdalifah	37	4	2018–present
4	Sheva Imut	37	5	2022–present
6	Reva Octaviani	35	5	2022–present
7	Viny Silfianus	34	0	2021–present
8	Marsela Awi	33	4	2022–present
9	Gea Yumanda	29	2	2023–present
10	Rosdillah Nurrohmah	27	2	2021–present

=== Top goalscorers ===
Claudia Scheunemann is Indonesia's top goalscorer with 9 goals

Rank	Player	Goals	Caps	Ratio	Career
1	**Claudia Scheunemann**	9	26	0.35	2023–present
2	**Baiq Amiatun**	5	17	0.29	2019–2024
2	**Reva Octaviani**	5	34	0.15	2021–present
2	**Sheva Imut**	5	36	0.14	2022–present
3	Rukijah	4	9	0.44	1986–1989
3	Yuri Maryati	4	12	0.33	1982–1986
3	Mayang Z.P.	4	13	0.31	2018–2019
3	**Marsela Awi**	4	28	0.14	2022–present
3	**Zahra Muzdalifah**	4	37	0.11	2018–present
4	Iin Parbo	3	8	0.38	1985–1986
4	Atmini	3	9	0.33	1985–1986
4	**Octavianti Dwi**	3	26	0.12	2018–present

== Competitive record ==
=== FIFA Women's World Cup ===
FIFA Women's World Cup record									Qualifications record					
Host / Year	Result	Position	Pld	W	D	L	GS	GA	Pld	W	D	L	GS	GA
(China) 1991	Did not enter								Did not enter					
(Sweden) 1995	Did not enter								Did not enter					
(United States) 1999	Did not enter								Did not enter					
(United States) 2003	Did not enter								Did not enter					
(China) 2007	Did not qualify								2	0	1	1	0	4
(Germany) 2011	Did not enter								Did not enter					
(Canada) 2015	Did not enter								Did not enter					
(France) 2019	Did not enter								Did not enter					
(Australia) (New Zealand) 2023	Did not qualify								5	2	0	3	2	26
(Brazil) 2027	Did not qualify								3	1	0	2	2	4
(Costa Rica) (Jamaica) (Mexico) (United States) 2031	To be determined								To be determined					
(United Kingdom) 2035	To be determined								To be determined					
Total	–	0/12	0	0	0	0	0	0	10	3	1	2	4	34

=== Olympic Games ===
Olympic Games record									Qualifications record					
Host / Year	Result	Position	Pld	W	D	L	GS	GA	Pld	W	D	L	GS	GA
(United States) 1996	Was not selected								No qualifiers					
(Australia) 2000	Was not selected								No qualifiers					
(Greece) 2004	Did not enter								Did not enter					
(China) 2008	Did not enter								Did not enter					
(United Kingdom) 2012	Did not enter								Did not enter					
(Brazil) 2016	Did not enter								Did not enter					
(Japan) 2020	Did not qualify								6	1	1	4	5	15
(France) 2024	Did not qualify								2	0	0	2	0	9
(United States) 2028	Did not qualify								3	1	0	2	2	4
(Australia) 2032	To be determined													
Total	−	0/8	0	0	0	0	0	0	8	1	1	6	5	24

=== AFC Women's Asian Cup ===
AFC Women's Asian Cup record									Qualifications record					
Host / Year	Result	Position	Pld	W	D	L	GS	GA	Pld	W	D	L	GS	GA
(Hong Kong) 1975	Did not enter								No qualifiers					
(Taiwan) 1977	Fourth place	4th	4	1	0	3	2	9	No qualifiers					
(India) 1980	Did not enter								No qualifiers					
(Hong Kong) 1981	Group stage	8th	3	0	0	3	0	14	No qualifiers					
(Thailand) 1983	Did not enter								No qualifiers					
(Hong Kong) 1986	Fourth place	4th	5	2	0	3	8	17	No qualifiers					
(Hong Kong) 1989	Group stage	5th	3	1	1	1	8	11	No qualifiers					
(Japan) 1991	Did not enter								No qualifiers					
(Malaysia) 1993	Did not enter								No qualifiers					
(Malaysia) 1995	Did not enter								No qualifiers					
(China) 1997	Did not enter								No qualifiers					
(Philippines) 1999	Did not enter								No qualifiers					
(Chinese Taipei) 2001	Did not enter								No qualifiers					
(Thailand) 2003	Did not enter								No qualifiers					
(Australia) 2006	Did not qualify								2	0	1	1	0	4
(Vietnam) 2008	Did not enter								Did not enter					
(China) 2010	Did not enter								Did not enter					
(Vietnam) 2014	Did not enter								Did not enter					
(Jordan) 2018	Did not enter								Did not enter					
(India) 2022	Group stage	12th	3	0	0	3	0	28	2	2	0	0	2	0
(Australia) 2026	Did not qualify								3	1	0	2	2	4
(Uzbekistan) 2029	To be determined													
Total	Best: Fourth place	5/20	18	4	1	13	18	77	7	3	1	3	4	8

*Draws include knockout matches decided on penalty kicks.

AFC Women's Asian Cup history
First match	Taiwan 5–0 Indonesia (2 August 1977; Taipei, Taiwan)
Biggest win	Indonesia 8–0 Nepal (22 December 1989; Mong Kok, Hong Kong)
Biggest defeat	Australia 18–0 Indonesia (21 January 2022; Mumbai, India)
Best result	Fourth place (1977, 1986)
Worst result	Group stage (1981, 1989, 2022)

=== Asian Games ===
Asian Games record
Host / Year	Result	Position	Pld	W	D	L	GS	GA
1990 to 2014	Did not enter							
(Indonesia) 2018	Group stage	9th	3	1	0	2	6	16
(China) 2022	Did not enter							
(Japan) 2026	Did not qualify							
(Qatar) 2030	To be determined							
(Saudi Arabia) 2034	To be determined							
Total	Best: Group stage	1/9	3	1	0	2	6	16

Asian Games history
First match	Indonesia 6–0 Maldives (16 August 2018; Palembang, Indonesia)
Biggest win	Indonesia 6–0 Maldives (16 August 2018; Palembang, Indonesia)
Biggest defeat	Indonesia 0–12 South Korea (21 August 2018; Palembang, Indonesia)
Best result	Group stage (2018)
Worst result	-

=== ASEAN Women's Championship ===
ASEAN Women's Championship (1982–1985) record
Host / Year	Result	Position	Pld	W	D	L	GS	GA
(Thailand) 1982	Runners-up	2nd	3	2	0	1	4	4
(Malaysia) 1985	Runners-up	2nd	5	3	0	2	10	4
Total	Best: Runners-up	2/2	8	5	0	3	14	8

ASEAN Women's Championship (since 2004) record
Host / Year	Result	Position	Pld	W	D	L	GS	GA
(Vietnam) 2004	Fourth place	4th	5	1	0	4	2	13
(Vietnam) 2006	Did not enter							
(Myanmar) 2007	Group stage	5th	3	1	0	2	3	12
(Vietnam) 2008	Group stage	6th	4	1	0	3	3	11
(Laos) 2011	Group stage	5th	3	1	0	2	3	26
(Vietnam) 2012	Withdrew							
(Myanmar) 2013	Group stage	10th	4	0	0	4	1	20
(Vietnam) 2015	Group stage	8th	3	0	0	3	1	19
(Myanmar) 2016	Did not enter							
(Indonesia) 2018	Group stage	8th	4	0	2	2	4	15
(Thailand) 2019	Group stage	6th	3	1	0	2	4	14
(Philippines) 2022	Group stage	10th	5	0	1	4	2	15
(Vietnam) 2025	Group stage	7th	3	0	1	2	1	15
2027	Qualified							
Total	Best: Fourth place	9/12	37	5	4	28	24	160

ASEAN Women's Championship history
First match	Indonesia 1–0 Philippines (30 September 2004; Vietnam)
Biggest win	Cambodia 0–4 Indonesia (20 August 2019; Chonburi, Thailand)
Biggest defeat	Indonesia 0–14 Vietnam (20 October 2011; Vientiane, Laos)
Best result	Fourth place (2004)
Worst result	Group stage (2007, 2008, 2011, 2013, 2015, 2018, 2019, 2022, 2025)

=== AFF Women's Cup ===
AFF Women's Cup record
Host / Year	Result	Position	Pld	W	D	L	GS	GA
(Laos) 2024	Champions	1st	4	3	1	0	7	1
(Malaysia) 2026	Champions	1st	4	3	1	0	10	1
Total	Best: Champions	2/2	8	6	2	0	17	2

ASEAN Women's Cup history
First match	Indonesia 0–0 Cambodia (23 November 2024; Vientiane, Laos)
Biggest win	Laos 0–5 Indonesia (22 July 2026; Kuala Lumpur, Malaysia)
Biggest defeat	
Best result	Champions (2024,2026)
Worst result	-

=== SEA Games ===
SEA Games record
Host / Year	Result	Position	Pld	W	D	L	GS	GA
1977 to 1983	Did not held							
(Thailand) 1985	Did not enter							
1987 to 1993	Did not held							
(Thailand) 1995	Did not enter							
(Indonesia) 1997	Fourth place	4th	4	0	2	2	2	6
(Brunei) 1999	Did not held							
(Malaysia) 2001	Fourth place	4th	4	1	0	3	1	11
(Vietnam) 2003	Group stage	7th	3	0	2	1	3	9
(Philippines) 2005	Group stage	5th	4	0	0	4	1	17
(Thailand) 2007	Did not enter							
(Laos) 2009	Did not enter							
(Indonesia) 2011	Did not held							
(Myanmar) 2013	Withdrew							
(Singapore) 2015	Did not held							
(Malaysia) 2017	Did not enter							
(Philippines) 2019	Group stage	5th	2	0	0	2	1	11
(Vietnam) 2021	Withdrew							
(Cambodia) 2023	Withdrew							
(Thailand) 2025	Fourth place	4th	4	1	0	3	3	16
Total	Best: Fourth place	6/12	21	2	4	15	11	70

SEA Games history
First match	Myanmar 1–1 Indonesia (8 October 1997; Jakarta, Indonesia)
Biggest win	Singapore 1–3 Indonesia (7 December 2025; Chonburi, Thailand)
Biggest defeat	Vietnam 8–0 Indonesia (30 November 2005; Marikina, Philippines); Thailand 8–0 Indonesia (4 December 2025; Chonburi, Thailand)
Best result	Fourth place (1997, 2001,2025)
Worst result	Group stage (2003, 2005, 2019)

== Head-to-head record ==
Below is a list of matches detailing Indonesia's matches against FIFA-recognized teams.

As of 10 October 2026

More wins Wins equal losses More losses

Indonesia national football team head-to-head records
Against	GP	W	D	L	GF	GA	GD	Confederation
Armenia	1	0	1	0	0	0	0	UEFA
Australia	1	0	0	1	0	18	−18	AFC
Bangladesh	1	0	1	0	0	0	0	AFC
Bahrain	3	2	0	1	6	4	2	AFC
China	1	0	0	1	0	9	−9	AFC
Cambodia	5	2	3	0	9	3	6	AFC
Chinese Taipei	4	0	0	4	1	15	−14	AFC
DR Congo	1	0	0	1	1	7	−6	CAF
Hong Kong	4	1	1	2	6	10	–4	AFC
India	2	0	0	2	0	5	−5	AFC
Japan	2	0	0	2	0	12	−12	AFC
Jordan	2	0	1	1	1	4	−3	AFC
South Korea	1	0	0	1	0	12	−12	AFC
Kyrgyzstan	1	1	0	0	1	0	1	AFC
Laos	5	1	0	4	6	16	−10	AFC
Lebanon	1	0	0	1	0	5	−5	AFC
Luxembourg	1	0	0	1	0	1	−1	UEFA
Malaysia	9	4	3	2	15	11	4	AFC
Maldives	3	2	1	0	9	1	8	AFC
Myanmar	7	0	1	6	2	32	−30	AFC
Nepal	4	3	0	1	17	3	14	AFC
Netherlands	1	0	0	1	0	15	-15	UEFA
New Caledonia	1	1	0	0	4	2	2	OFC
New Zealand	1	1	0	0	5	0	5	OFC
Pakistan	1	0	0	1	0	2	−2	AFC
Palestine	1	0	1	0	1	1	0	AFC
Philippines	10	3	2	5	10	29	−19	AFC
Saudi Arabia	3	2	1	0	3	1	2	AFC
Singapore	16	11	2	4	25	12	13	AFC
Switzerland	1	0	1	0	2	2	0	UEFA
Thailand	15	0	0	15	3	74	−71	AFC
Timor-Leste	1	1	0	0	2	0	2	AFC
Vietnam	11	0	0	11	1	70	−69	AFC
Total	120	34	19	67	125	376	−251	—N/a

== Honours ==
=== Regional ===
- AFF Women's Cup
  - (gold) Champion: 2024, 2026

=== Friendly ===
- FIFA Series
  - (bronze) Third-place: 2026

== Gallery ==
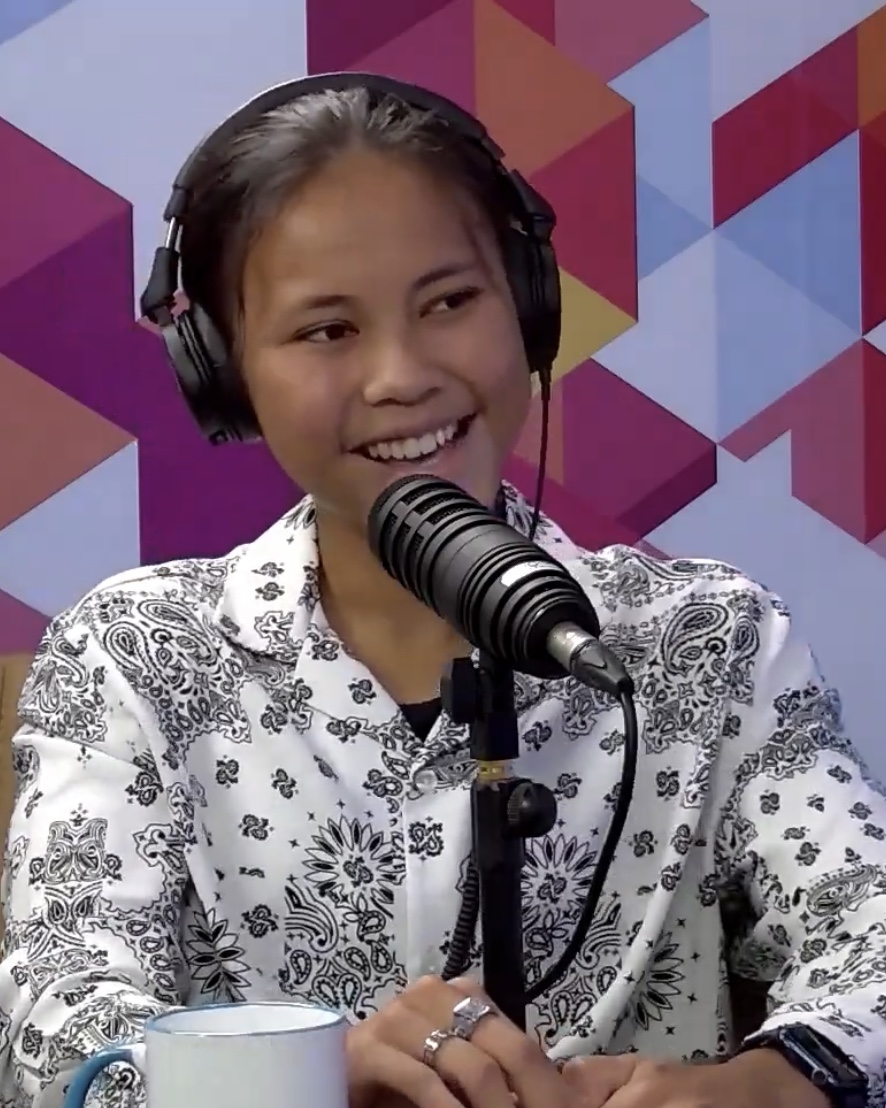
Shalika Aurelia

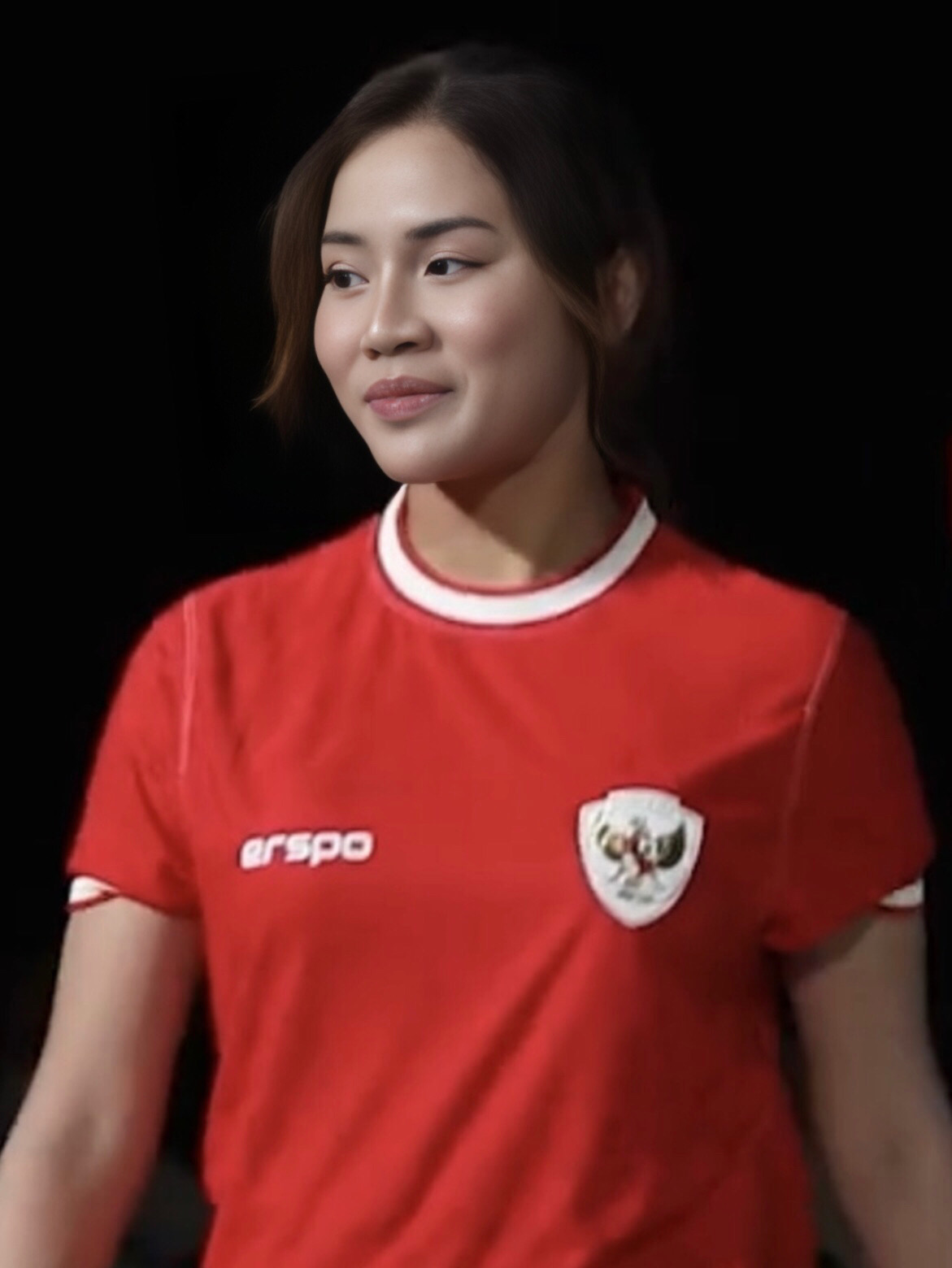
Safira Ika

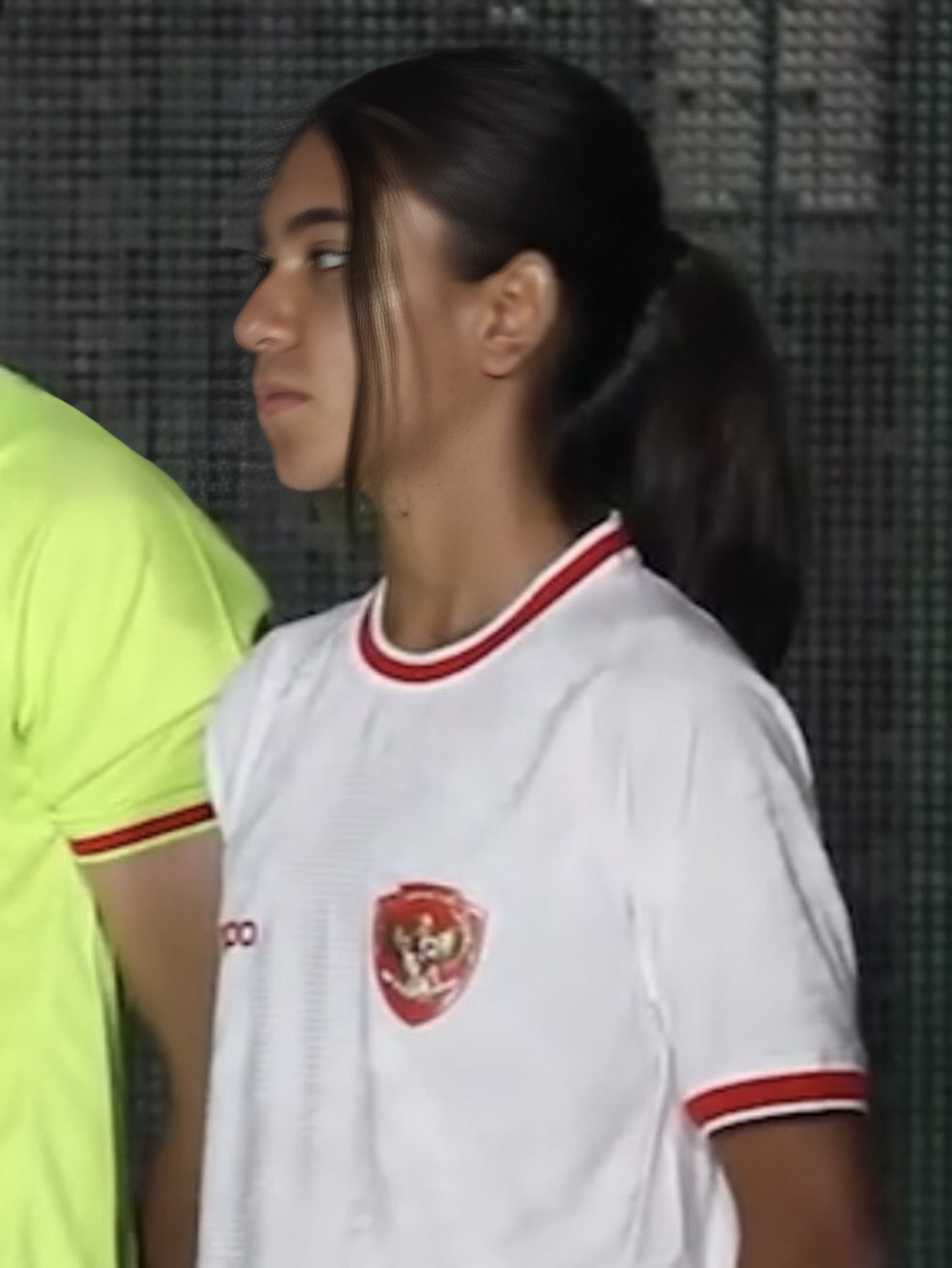
Claudia Scheunemann

== See also ==
- Sports in Indonesia
  - Football in Indonesia
    - Women's football in Indonesia
- Indonesia women's national under-20 football team
- Indonesia women's national under-17 football team
- Indonesia women's national futsal team
- Indonesia men's national football team
- Indonesia men's national futsal team
- Indonesia men's national beach soccer team
