= Yance Sayuri =

Indonesian footballer

Personal information
- Full name: Yance Sayuri
- Date of birth: 22 September 1997 (age 29)
- Place of birth: Yapen, Indonesia
- Height: 1.70 m (5 ft 7 in)
- Positions: Left-back; winger

Team information
- Current team: Java United
- Number: 23

Senior career*
Years	Team	Apps	(Gls)
2018–2020	Persemi Mimika		
2021–2024	PSM Makassar	69	(5)
2024–	Java United	67	(8)

International career^{‡}
2023–	Indonesia	4	(0)
- * Club domestic league appearances and goals as of 19 September 2026 ‡ National team caps and goals as of 8 October 2025

Yance Sayuri (born 22 September 1997), commonly known as Yann, is an Indonesian professional footballer who plays as a left-back or winger for Super League club Java United and the Indonesia national team. His twin brother Yakob is also a footballer and plays for Malut United.

== Club career ==
=== PSM Makassar ===
Yance signed for Liga 1 club PSM Makassar in 2021. He made his league debut on 26 October against Persikabo 1973.

On 8 December 2022, Yance scored his first league goal for PSM Makassar in a 3–1 won over Persita Tangerang.

On 9 February 2023, Yance scored in a 4–1 home win over PS Barito Putera. Five days later, he scored the winning goal in a 2–1 win over Persib Bandung. On 5 March, he scored again in a 3–2 home win over Persis Solo.

=== Malut United / Java United ===
On 1 July 2024, Yance along with his brother Yakob, signed with Malut United. On 21 September 2024, Yance scored his first goal for the club against Bali United.

On 16 May 2025, Yance scored his first hat-trick in career against PSIS Semarang in a 5–1 win.

== International career ==
In March 2023, Yance received his first called up to the national team by Shin Tae-yong. On 28 March, Yance made his debut against Burundi, playing alongside his twin brother, Yakob, making them the first twin brothers that played at the same time for the Indonesia senior team.

On 10 June 2025, Yance made his second cap for the national team under Patrick Kluivert against Japan where he played full match in the last game of third round of 2026 FIFA World Cup qualification.

== Career statistics ==
=== Club ===
As of 19 September 2026.

Club	Season	League			Cup		Continental		Other		Total	
Club	Season	Division	Apps	Goals	Apps	Goals	Apps	Goals	Apps	Goals	Apps	Goals
PSM Makassar	2021–22	Liga 1	16	0	0	0	—		1 (Note: Appearances in Menpora Cup)	0	17	0
PSM Makassar	2022–23	Liga 1	31	5	0	0	4 (Note: Appearances in AFC Cup)	0	4 (Note: Appearances in Indonesia President's Cup)	0	39	5
PSM Makassar	2023–24	Liga 1	26	0	0	0	4	3	0	0	30	3
PSM Makassar	Total		69	5	0	0	8	3	5	0	82	8
Java United	2024–25	Liga 1	32	7	0	0	—		0	0	32	7
Java United	2025–26	Super League	32	1	0	0	—		0	0	32	1
Java United	2026–27	Super League	3	0	0	0	—		0	0	3	0
Career total			136	13	0	0	8	3	5	0	149	16

=== International ===
As of match played 8 October 2025

Appearances and goals by national team and year
National team	Year	Apps	Goals
Indonesia	2023	1	0
Indonesia	2025	3	0
Total		4	0

== Honours ==
PSM Makassar

- Liga 1: 2022–23

Individual

- Liga 1 Goal of the Month: December 2022
- Liga 1 Team of the Season: 2022–23
- APPI Indonesian Football Award Best XI: 2023–24, 2024–25
- PSSI Awards Assist of the Year: 2026
