= Sydney Hopper =

Indonesian footballer (born 2007)

- Hopper in 2024

Personal information
- Full name: Sydney Sari Hopper
- Date of birth: 15 March 2007 (age 19)
- Place of birth: Little Rock, Arkansas, U.S.
- Height: 1.73 m (5 ft 8 in)
- Positions: Forward; attacking midfielder

Team information
- Current team: Tulsa SC
- Number: 18

Youth career
- 2013–: Tulsa SC

College career
Years	Team	Apps	(Gls)
2025–	Dallas Baptist Patriots	11	(0)

International career^{‡}
2025–	Indonesia U19	4	(1)
2024–	Indonesia	12	(2)
- ‡ National team caps and goals as of 16 June 2025

Sydney Sari Hopper (born 15 March 2007) is a footballer who plays as a forward or attacking midfielder for Elite Clubs National League club Tulsa SC. Born in the United States, she represents Indonesia at international level.

== Early life and youth career ==
Sydney Sari Hopper was born on March 15, 2007, in Little Rock, Arkansas, United States. She is half-Indonesian through her mother, Kartika, who was born in Jakarta, Indonesia. Her maternal grandparents have Chinese Indonesian ancestry. She was interested in playing soccer since the age of 6, which then led her to sign up for Tulsa SC, a youth soccer developmental team that competes in the Elite Clubs National League (ECNL).

== College career ==
On November 14, 2024, Hopper officially signed with the college team, the Dallas Baptist Patriots, which represented Dallas Baptist University (DBU) in the NCAA Division II women's soccer tournament. She will play with the club in the 2025 season after completing her youth career at Tulsa SC.

== International career ==
Born in the United States, Hopper decided to represent Indonesia at the international level. On July 5, 2024, Secretary General of the Football Association of Indonesia (PSSI) Yunus Nusi revealed that Hopper had obtained an Indonesian passport, so she did not need a naturalization process.

On 14 July 2024, she made her debut for the national team in a friendly match against Hong Kong. She played for 45 minutes and was substituted by another debutant, Katarina Stalin.

== Career statistics ==
=== International ===
As of match played 31 May 2025

Appearances and goals by national team and year
National team	Year	Apps	Goals
Indonesia	2024	6	1
Indonesia	2025	3	0
Total		9	1

As of match played 5 December 2024
Indonesia score listed first, score column indicates score after each Hopper goal

List of international goals scored by Sydney Hopper
No.	Date	Venue	Opponent	Score	Result	Competition
1	5 December 2024	New Laos National Stadium, Vientiane, Laos	Cambodia	2–1	3–1	2024 AFF Women's Cup
2	22 July 2026	Kuala Lumpur Stadium, Kuala Lumpur, Malaysia	Laos	1–0	5–0	2026 AFF Women's Cup

== Honors ==
Indonesia U19

- ASEAN U-19 Women's Championship third place: 2025

Indonesia

- AFF Women's Cup: 2024, 2026

== See also ==
- List of Indonesia international footballers born outside Indonesia
