= Danelle Tan =

Singaporean footballer (born 2004)

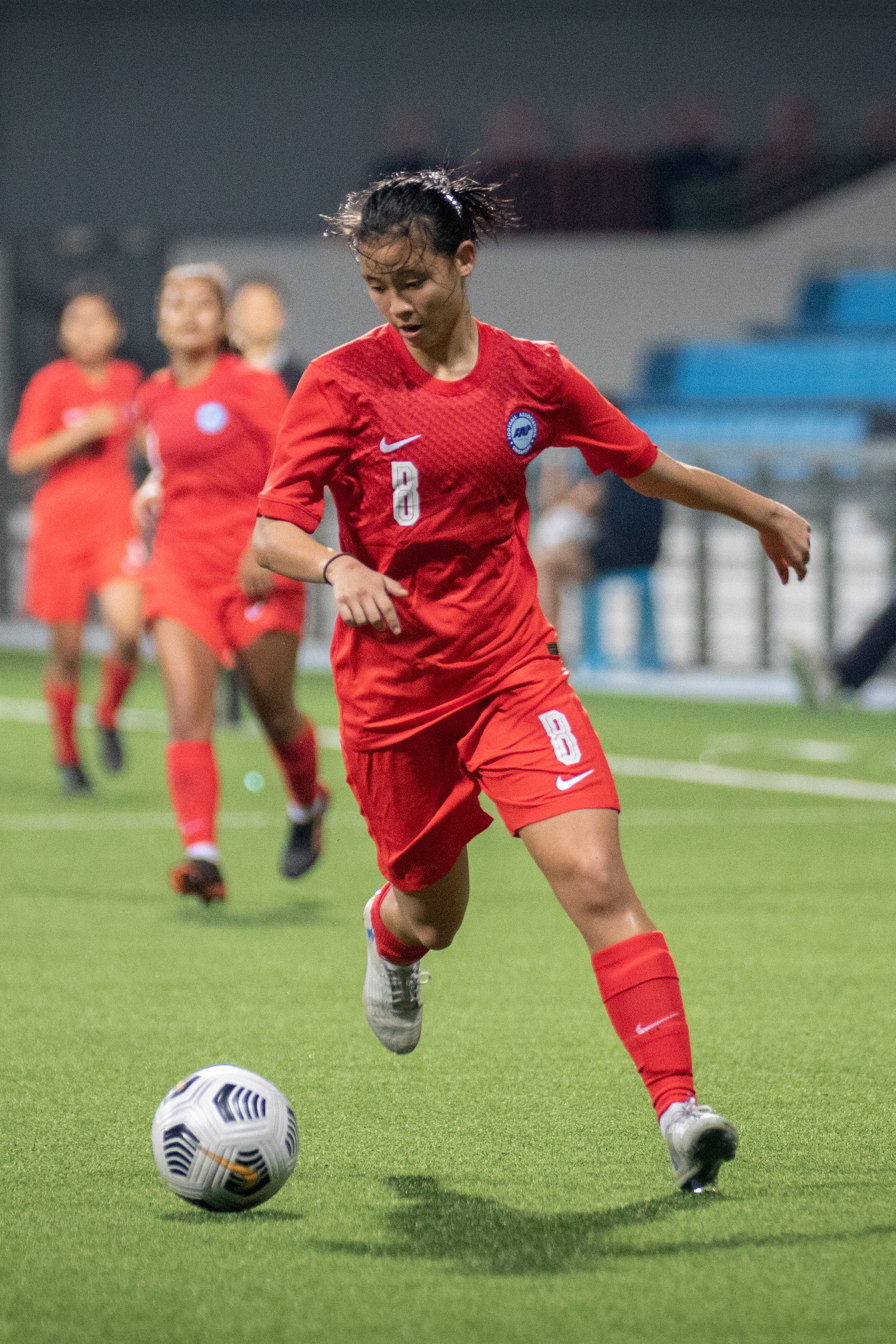
- Tan with Singapore in 2022

Personal information
- Full name: Danelle Tan Li Ern
- Date of birth: 25 October 2004 (age 22)
- Place of birth: Singapore
- Height: 1.70 m (5 ft 7 in)
- Position: Forward

Senior career*
Years	Team	Apps	(Gls)
2019	Still Aerion	10	(20)
2020–2022	Lion City Sailors	10	(11)
2023	London Bees	12	(2)
2023–2024	Borussia Dortmund	27	(16)
2024–2025	Brisbane Roar	3	(0)
2025–	Nippon TV Tokyo Verdy Beleza	16	(2)

International career^{‡}
2019	Singapore U15	6	(6)
2017–2019	Singapore U16	11	(4)
2018–2019	Singapore U19	3	(0)
2019–	Singapore	32	(14)
- * Club domestic league appearances and goals as of 21:22, 18 October 2026 (UTC) ‡ National team caps and goals as of 17:30, 22 July 2026 (UTC)

Danelle Tan Li Ern (Note: Chinese: 陈乐恩; pinyin: Chén Lè'ēn) (born 25 October 2004) is a Singaporean professional footballer who currently plays as a striker for WE League club Nippon TV Tokyo Verdy Beleza and the Singapore women's national team.

== Early life and education ==
Tan started playing football when she was 6 and joined her brothers at JSSL academy. She scored 12 goals in her first session. Tan moved to London, England to study at Mill Hill School in 2022. Tan became the first Singaporean footballer to sign for an NCAA Division 1 team. She later decided to forgo her place when she signed for Borussia Dortmund.

== Club career ==
In 2019, Tan joined Still Aerion, an amateur women's team from the FAS Women's National League. Scoring on her debut match in May 2019 at the age of 14 made her the second-youngest goal scorer in the league's history. Tan scored 16 goals in 6 games and became the league's top scorer for the season. She also scored 4 goals in the Challenge Cup and helped the club to enter the finals where they lost 0–1 to Tanjong Pagar United.

Tan then joined Lion City Sailors in 2020 but played no official matches due to the COVID-19 pandemic in Singapore. While studying at Mill Hill School in London, she was part of the school's first XI football team and was the first female footballer in the team.

Tan made her debut for Lion City Sailors in July 2022 against Still Aerion FC. She scored two minutes after coming on in the second half and she scored again 14 minutes later.

Tan became the first female Singaporean to play in a European league when she came on as a substitute for London Bees in their 2–1 defeat by Plymouth Argyle.

Tan became the first Asian to join Borussia Dortmund in July 2023. Tan scored her first goal for Dortmund in a pre-season friendly against Alemannia Aachen. She was also awarded the top scorer with five goals in the Peuler Deerns Cup which Dortmund won. Tan made her competitive debut on 12 August 2023 for Dortmund in a 7–0 win against SC Borchen in the Westphalian Cup. She scored three goals in six pre-season friendlies.

On her debut match for Dortmund in the Landesliga against DJK Spvgg Herten, Tan made three assists and scored a hat-trick in a 13–0 rout. She was voted player of the match for her efforts. Dortmund won the fifth-tier Landesliga and was promoted to the fourth-tier Westfalenliga with 5 games to go in the season. Tan contributed 14 goals in 20 matches. Ten days later, Tan helped her team lift the Kreispokal, a regional cup, with a 1–0 win over SpVg Berghofen in the final on 1 May.

In August 2024 Tan received her first professional contract joining Australian club Brisbane Roar. She made her debut on 4 January 2025 in a 1–2 defeat against Canberra United. She scored in Brisbane Roar's tour in Singapore during their friendly match against a Singapore Women's Premier League All-stars team. She left the club upon the expiration of her contract.

On 19 July 2025, it was announced that Tan has signed a one-year contract with Nippon TV Tokyo Verdy Beleza, the defending champions of WE League, Japan's top flight women league . She made her debut in a 2-0 loss to International Athletic Club Kobe Leonessa in the club's season opener. Tan scored her first goal on 12 Nov 2025, when she scored in the 1-0 win over Myanmar’s ISPE in an AFC Women’s Champions League group game in Yangon.

== International career ==
Tan made the Singapore U16 in 2017 at the age of 12. She scored her first goal for the under 16 team in September 2018 in a 4–1 win against Tajikistan. She registered her first hat-trick a few days later in a 4–0 win against Northern Mariana Islands.

Tan made her Singapore U19 debut on 24 October 2018 in a 0–8 loss against Jordan in the 2019 AFC U-19 Women's Championship qualification. She was the youngest player in the Singapore squad at the age of 13.

In a UEFA-FAS tournament in March 2019, Tan scored four goals against Guam and one against Cambodia, to be the joint top scorer in the tournament held in Singapore. She also received the Golden Boot of the UEFA Under-15 Tournament in 2019.

Tan was called up to the senior national team and made her debut on 16 August 2019 at the AFF Women's Championship. She scored a last-minute goal in the 1–2 defeat against Timor-Leste. She was 14 years, which made her the youngest goalscorer in Singapore and the fifth youngest in the world.

In the 2022 FAS Tri-Nations Series, Tan scored two goals and had one assist in a 6–2 win against Seychelles. She was also named as one of three best players in a 0–1 defeat against Papua New Guinea.

Tan scored her first international hat trick in a 9–0 win against Macau on 16 July 2024. Tan scored in the 54th, 61st and 65th minutes. The 11 minutes it took to complete her hat trick ranks as the 3rd fastest recorded in international women's football.

Tan scored a brace in Singapore's 7-0 win over the Seychelles on 28 Nov 2025 and is the leading scorer for Singapore.

Tan was crowned the top scorer for the AFF Women’s Cup with 4 goals. She helped Singapore achieve 3rd place by scoring the opening goal in the third/fourth placing match against Cambodia.

== Personal life ==
Tan has been chosen to be an ambassador for women's football in Singapore and has been honoured by Edwin Tong, Singapore's Minister for Culture, Community and Youth at the 2022 Women's Football Conference. Tan was cited as one of eight Singaporean women trailblazers.

As part of Singapore SG60 celebrations, Tan penned a letter to Singapore as part of a CNA series.

Tan also represented Singapore age group in chess when she was nine years old. She was listed as 143rd in the world for best girls under 10 years old.

== Career statistics ==
=== Club ===
As of match played 18 October 2026

Appearances and goals by club, season and competition
Club	Season	League			Cups		Total	
Club	Season	Division	Apps	Goals	Apps	Goals	Apps	Goals
Still Aerion	2019	Women's National League	6	16	4	4	10	20
Lion City Sailors	2022	Women's Premier League	4	5	0	0	4	5
London Bees	2022–23	FA Women's National League	10	2	2	0	12	2
Borussia Dortmund	2023–24	Landesliga Westfalen	20	14	7	2	27	16
Borussia Dortmund II	2023–24	Bezirksliga	1	4	0	0	1	4
Brisbane Roar	2024–25	A-League Women	3	0	0	0	3	0
Nippon TV Tokyo Verdy Beleza	2025–26	WE League	9	0	5	2	14	2
Nippon TV Tokyo Verdy Beleza	2026–27	WE League	1	0	1	0	2	0
Career total			54	41	19	8	73	49

=== International ===
As of match played 22 July 2026

Appearances and goals by national team and year
National team	Year	Apps	Goals
Singapore	2019	3	1
Singapore	2021	2	0
Singapore	2022	10	2
Singapore	2023	6	1
Singapore	2024	1	3
Singapore	2025	4	2
Singapore	2026	6	5
Total		32	14

Scores and results list Singapore's goal tally first, score column indicates score after each Tan goal.

List of international goals scored by Danelle Tan
No.	Date	Venue	Opponent	Score	Result	Competition
1	15 August 2019	IPE Chonburi Stadium, Chonburi, Thailand	Timor-Leste	1–2	1–2	2019 AFF Women's Championship
2	4 April 2022	Jalan Besar Stadium, Jalan Besar, Singapore	Seychelles	3–1	6–2	2022 FAS Tri-Nations Series
3	4 April 2022	Jalan Besar Stadium, Jalan Besar, Singapore	Seychelles	6–2	6–2	2022 FAS Tri-Nations Series
4	4 April 2023	Chonburi Stadium, Chonburi, Thailand	Mongolia	1–1	2–2	2024 AFC Women's Olympic Qualifying Tournament
5	16 July 2024	Jalan Besar Stadium, Jalan Besar, Singapore	Macau	4–0	9–0	Friendly
6	16 July 2024	Jalan Besar Stadium, Jalan Besar, Singapore	Macau	6–0	9–0	Friendly
7	16 July 2024	Jalan Besar Stadium, Jalan Besar, Singapore	Macau	7–0	9–0	Friendly
8	28 November 2025	Bukit Gombak Stadium, Bukit Gombak, Singapore	Seychelles	5–0	7–0	Friendly
9	28 November 2025	Bukit Gombak Stadium, Bukit Gombak, Singapore	Seychelles	7–0	7–0	Friendly
10	3 June 2026	Arcamanik Stadium, Bandung, Indonesia	Indonesia	1–0	2–0	Friendly
11	13 July 2026	Kuala Lumpur Stadium, Kuala Lumpur, Malaysia	Laos	1–1	1–1	2026 AFF Women's Cup
12	16 July 2026	Kuala Lumpur Stadium, Kuala Lumpur, Malaysia	Malaysia	2–0	3–1	2026 AFF Women's Cup
13	16 July 2026	Kuala Lumpur Stadium, Kuala Lumpur, Malaysia	Malaysia	3–1	3–1	2026 AFF Women's Cup
14	22 July 2026	Kuala Lumpur Stadium, Kuala Lumpur, Malaysia	Cambodia	1–0	1–1 (4–3 p)	2026 AFF Women's Cup

== Honours ==
Singapore

- 2026 AFF Women’s Cup 3rd place
- 2026 AFF Women’s Cup Top Scorer

Borussia Dortmund

- Landesliga: 2023–24
- Kreispokal: 2023–24
- Peuler Deerns Cup: 2023
- Peuler Deerns Cup Top Scorer: 2023

Tokyo Verdy Beleza

- Kracie Cup: 2025-2026
- Asian Women’s Champions League Runners-up : 2025-26
