= Kei Homma =

Japanese football manager and coach

Personal information
- Full name: Kei Homma
- Date of birth: May 14, 1985 (age 41)
- Place of birth: Kōchi Prefecture, Japan
- Position: Defender

Senior career*
Years	Team	Apps	(Gls)
2004–2007	Japan Soccer College		

Managerial career
- 2012–2014: manager for U-14's Laos national football team
- 2012–2013: assistant coach for Laos national football team
- 2013–2014: manager for Laos women's national football team
- 2014–: U-19's Sri Lanka women's national football team
- * Club domestic league appearances and goals

Kei Homma (本間 圭, Homma Kei; born 1985) is a Japanese football manager and coach.

== History ==
After graduating from Japan Soccer College (Niigata Prefecture), he started a career as a football coach for domestic football clubs. From 2008 until 2011, he stayed in Shanghai China, where he was the first football coach at a Japanese football team for Japanese nationals and was involved in the creation of the school's club team.

From 2012, he was despatched as a U-14's Laos national team manager to Laos Football Federation by Japan Football Association as a part of football's Asia Development Assistance. At the same time, he worked as an assistant coach for Kokichi Kimura who was despatched to LFF as senior national team manager by JFA.

From 2013, he also worked as both manager of Laos women's national football team and manager of U-14's Laos national team.

Since 2014, he has moved from LFF to Football Federation of Sri Lanka.
