= 1977 AFC Women's Championship =

Tournament details
- Host country: Republic of China
- Dates: 2–11 August
- Teams: 6 (from 1 confederation)
- Venue: 1 (in 1 host city)

Final positions
- Champions: Taiwan (1st title)
- Runners-up: Thailand
- Third place: Singapore
- Fourth place: Indonesia

Tournament statistics
- Matches played: 9
- Goals scored: 30 (3.33 per match)

The Asian Football Confederation's 1977 AFC Women's Championship was the second AFC Women's Championship. It was held from 2 to 11 August 1977 in Taipei, Republic of China. The tournament was won by the Republic of China for the first time, who defeated Thailand in the final.

== Entrants ==
ALFC members
- Taiwan (Host)*
- Hong Kong
- Thailand
- Singapore
- Indonesia
- Japan (Note: Japan was represented by FC Jinnan)

== Group stage ==
=== Group A ===
Team	Pld	W	D	L	GF	GA	GD	Pts
Taiwan	2	2	0	0	12	0	+12	4
Indonesia	2	1	0	1	1	5	−4	2
Japan	2	0	0	2	0	8	−8	0

Source: RSSSF
2 August 1977

Taiwan	5–0	Indonesia
Ho Su-Ching 29', 37', 50'; Liu Su-Yueh 32'; Chou Tai-Mei 60'

Taipei Municipal Stadium, Taipei

5 August 1977

Indonesia	1–0	Japan
Lantang 20'

Taipei Municipal Stadium, Taipei

7 August 1977

Taiwan	7–0	Japan
Liu Su-Yueh 7', 10'; Lin Shu-Chen 17', 59'; Chen Shu-Mei 40'; Hsia Chih-Feng 42'; Chuang Hsiu-Lih 56'

Taipei Municipal Stadium, Taipei

=== Group B ===
Team	Pld	W	D	L	GF	GA	GD	Pts
Thailand	2	2	0	0	7	0	+7	4
Singapore	2	1	0	1	1	2	−1	2
Hong Kong	2	0	0	2	0	6	−6	0

Source: RSSSF
3 August 1977

Thailand	2–0	Singapore
Wanvilai Thongsa 52', 55'

Taipei Municipal Stadium, Taipei
5 August 1977

Thailand	5–0	Hong Kong
Wanvilai Thongsa 4', 42'; Wulabi 17'; Yupadee Chaisawad 23'; Chenjiana 46'

Taipei Municipal Stadium, Taipei
7 August 1977

Singapore	1–0	Hong Kong
Aisha 33'

Taipei Municipal Stadium, Taipei

== Knock-out stage ==
Semi-finals
9 August
Taiwan	3
Singapore	0
9 August
Thailand	2
Indonesia	1

Final
11 August
Taiwan	1
Thailand	0
Third place
11 August
Singapore	2
Indonesia	0

=== Semi-final ===
9 August 1977

Taiwan	3–0	Singapore
Liu Su-Yueh 4'; Lin Shu-Chen 20'; Chen Shu-Ying 22'

Taipei Municipal Stadium, Taipei
9 August 1977

Thailand	2–1	Indonesia

Taipei Municipal Stadium, Taipei

=== Third place match ===
11 August 1977

Singapore	2–0	Indonesia

Taipei Municipal Stadium, Taipei

=== Final ===
11 August 1977

Taiwan	1–0	Thailand
Hsia Chih-Feng 54'

Taipei Municipal Stadium, Taipei

== Winner ==
AFC Women's Championship
1977 winners

Taiwan
First title

== See also ==
- List of sporting events in Taiwan
