= Laos national football team results =

This article details the fixtures and results of the Laos national football team.
