= 2013 AFF Women's Championship squads =

Below are the squads for the 2013 AFF Women's Championship, hosted by Myanmar, which took place between 9 and 22 September 2013. 10 teams took part in the championships.

== Group B ==
=== Indonesia ===
Caps and goals counted for the 2013 AFF Women's Championship only.

No.	Pos.	Player	Date of birth (age)	Caps	Goals	Club
1	GK	Nungki Entitisari		0	0	(Football Association of Indonesia) State University of Jakarta
12	GK	Efie Iswandari		2	0	(Football Association of Indonesia) Tifosi Alonza
22	GK	Deliana Fatmawati Kaban		1	0	(Football Association of Indonesia) Indonesia University of Education
4	DF	Retno Ayu Dwi		3	0	(Football Association of Indonesia) Tifosi Alonza
5	DF	Sri Yulianti		3	0	(Football Association of Indonesia) Jaya Kencana Angels
7	DF	Anggi Puspita Sari		3	0	(Football Association of Indonesia) Jaya Kencana Angels
8	DF	Yunita Sari		1	0	(Football Association of Indonesia) Indonesia University of Education
11	DF	Suciana Yuliani		3	0	(Football Association of Indonesia) Jaya Kencana Angels
19	DF	Maya Muharina Fajriah		3	0	(Football Association of Indonesia) Netic Ladies
6	MF	Novita Murni Piranti		3	0	(Football Association of Indonesia) Indonesia University of Education
9	MF	Maulina Novryliani (Captain)		3	0	(Football Association of Indonesia) State University of Jakarta
17	MF	Maryati		2	0	(Football Association of Indonesia) Netic Ladies
18	MF	Tia Darti Septiawati		2	0	(Football Association of Indonesia) Indonesia University of Education
20	MF	Citra Arinda		2	0	(Football Association of Indonesia) Jaya Kencana Angels
2	FW	Tugiyati Cindy		3	1	(Football Association of Indonesia) Putri Mataram
10	FW	Rani Mulyasari		3	0	(Football Association of Indonesia) State University of Jakarta
13	FW	Intan Nuraini Ulfah		2	0	(Football Association of Indonesia) State University of Jakarta
15	FW	Fitri Rosdiana		3	0	(Football Association of Indonesia) Indonesia University of Education
