= 2026 AFF Women's Cup =

Piala Wanita AFF 2026

Tournament details
- Host country: Malaysia
- Dates: 10 July – 22 July
- Teams: 6 (from 1 sub-confederation)
- Venues: 2 (in 2 host cities)

Final positions
- Champions: Indonesia (2nd title)
- Runners-up: Laos
- Third place: Singapore
- Fourth place: Cambodia

Tournament statistics
- Matches played: 10
- Goals scored: 26 (2.6 per match)
- Top scorer(s): (Singapore) Danelle Tan (4 goals)
- Best player: (Indonesia) Sheva Imut
- Best goalkeeper: (Indonesia) Laita Roati

The 2026 AFF Women's Cup is the second edition of the AFF Women's Cup, a lower tier international women's football tournament organised by the ASEAN Football Federation (AFF). The tournament was held in Malaysia.

The top three teams qualified for the upcoming ASEAN Women's Championship. Indonesia, the inaugural champions, successfully defended their title defeating Laos in the final.

== Participating nations ==
The six lowest ranked AFF teams entered the AFF Women's Cup final tournament. These were the same teams that took part in the inaugural 2024 AFF Women's Cup.

Team	Previous Women's Cup best performance
Cambodia	Runners-up
Indonesia	Champions
Laos	Group stage
Malaysia	Group stage
Singapore	Third place
Timor-Leste	Fourth place

== Draw ==
The draw for the 2026 AFF Women's Cup was held on 22 June 2026 in Petaling Jaya, Malaysia. The teams were allocated into three pots based on their performances in the previous edition. Host Malaysia were automatically placed in position A1.

Pot 1	Pot 2	Pot 3
1. Malaysia (host); 2. Indonesia	3. Cambodia; 4. Singapore	5. Timor-Leste; 6. Laos

== Venues ==
Kuala Lumpur		2026 AFF Women's Cup is located in Peninsular Malaysia
Kuala Lumpur Stadium	UM Arena Stadium	2026 AFF Women's Cup is located in Peninsular Malaysia
Capacity: 18,000	Capacity: 1,500	2026 AFF Women's Cup is located in Peninsular Malaysia

== Group stage ==
Tiebreakers

Ranking in each group shall be determined as follows:

1. Greater number of points obtained in all the group matches;
2. Goal difference in all the group matches;
3. Greater number of goals scored in all the group matches;
4. Greater disciplinary points.

If two or more teams are equal on the basis on the above four criteria, the place shall be determined as follows:

1. Result of the direct match between the teams concerned;
2. Penalty shoot-out if only the teams are tied, and they met in the last round of the group;
3. Drawing lots by the Organising Committee.

All times are local time: (MST) UTC+8.

=== Group A ===
Pos	Team	Pld	W	D	L	GF	GA	GD	Pts	Qualification
1	Singapore	2	1	1	0	4	2	+2	4	Knockout stage
2	Laos	2	0	2	0	2	2	0	2	Knockout stage
3	Malaysia (H)	2	0	1	1	2	4	−2	1	

Rules for classification: Group stage tiebreakers
(H) Hosts
10 July 2026
20:45

Laos	1–1	Malaysia
Kemmy 37'	Report	Nurhadfina 50'

Kuala Lumpur Stadium, Kuala Lumpur
Referee: Asaka Koizumi (Japan)

13 July 2026
20:45

Singapore	1–1	Laos
Tan 47'	Report	Anna 41'

Kuala Lumpur Stadium, Kuala Lumpur
Referee: Bùi Thị Thu Trang (Vietnam)

16 July 2026
16:45

Malaysia	1–3	Singapore
Henrietta 58'	Report	Suresh 12'; Tan 44', 72' (pen.)

Kuala Lumpur Stadium, Kuala Lumpur
Referee: Pansa Chaisanit (Thailand)

=== Group B ===
Pos	Team	Pld	W	D	L	GF	GA	GD	Pts	Qualification
1	Cambodia	2	1	1	0	4	2	+2	4	Knockout stage
2	Indonesia	2	1	1	0	3	1	+2	4	Knockout stage
3	Timor-Leste	2	0	0	2	1	5	−4	0	

Rules for classification: Group stage tiebreakers
10 July 2026
16:45

Timor-Leste	0–2	Indonesia
	Report	Nahon 5'; Loupatty 28'

Kuala Lumpur Stadium, Kuala Lumpur
Referee: Pansa Chaisanit (Thailand)

13 July 2026
16:45

Cambodia	3–1	Timor-Leste
Sovanmony 29'; Sapheourn 36'; Serysitha 90+6'	Report	Juleica 2'

Kuala Lumpur Stadium, Kuala Lumpur
Referee: Zin Mar Oo (Myanmar)

16 July 2026
16:45

Indonesia	1–1	Cambodia
Sheva 42'	Report	Serysitha 47'

UM Arena Stadium, Kuala Lumpur
Referee: Asaka Koizumi (Japan)

== Knockout stage ==
Semi-finals
19 July – Kuala Lumpur
Cambodia	0
Laos	1
19 July – Kuala Lumpur
Singapore	0
Indonesia	2

Final
22 July – Kuala Lumpur
Laos	0
Indonesia	5
Third place
22 July – Kuala Lumpur
Cambodia	1 (3)
Singapore (p)	1 (4)

=== Semi-finals ===
The winners qualified for the 2027 ASEAN Women's Championship.

19 July 2026
16:45

Cambodia	0–1	Laos
	Report	Anna 1'

Kuala Lumpur Stadium, Kuala Lumpur
Referee: Nawal Zubir (Malaysia)
19 July 2026
20:45

Singapore	0–2	Indonesia
	Report	Gea 68'; Remini 80'

Kuala Lumpur Stadium, Kuala Lumpur
Referee: Asaka Koizumi (Japan)

=== Third place ===
Winner qualified for the 2027 ASEAN Women's Championship.

22 July 2026
16:45

Cambodia	1–1	Singapore
Vipha 70' (pen.)	Report	Tan 24'
Penalties
Maysam (penalty scored); Vipha (penalty scored); Serysitha (penalty missed); Samnang (penalty scored); Sovannomy (penalty missed)	3–4	(penalty scored) Mulan; (penalty missed) Li Xian; (penalty scored) Ruzi; (penalty scored) Farah; (penalty scored) Sarah

Kuala Lumpur Stadium, Kuala Lumpur
Referee: Jon Mick Pineda (Philippines)

=== Final ===
22 July 2026
20:45

Laos	0–5	Indonesia
	Report	Hopper 33'; Nottet 48'; Loupatty 56'; De Zeeuw 68'; Nahon 84'

Kuala Lumpur Stadium, Kuala Lumpur
Referee: Asaka Koizumi (Japan)

== Goalscorers ==
There were 26 goals scored in 10 matches, for an average of 2.6 goals per match.

4 goals

- (Singapore) Danelle Tan

2 goals

- (Cambodia) Serysitha Vibol
- (Indonesia) Emily Nahon
- (Indonesia) Estella Loupatty
- (Laos) Anna Keo Onsy

1 goal

- (Cambodia) Sapheourn Chhit
- (Cambodia) Soeurn Vipha
- (Cambodia) Sovanmony Heng
- (Indonesia) Felicia de Zeeuw
- (Indonesia) Isabelle Nottet
- (Indonesia) Sheva Imut
- (Indonesia) Sydney Hopper
- (Indonesia) Gea Yumanda
- (Indonesia) Remini Rumbewas
- (Laos) Kemmy Phatdala
- (Malaysia) Nurhadfina Mohd Firdaus
- (Malaysia) Henrietta Justine
- (Singapore) Yuvika Suresh
- (Timor-Leste) Juleica Da Costa

== Final ranking ==
As per statistical convention in football, matches decided in extra time are counted as wins and losses, while matches decided by penalty shoot-outs are counted as draws.

Pos	Team	Pld	W	D	L	GF	GA	GD	Pts	Qualification
1	Indonesia	4	3	1	0	10	1	+9	10	2027 ASEAN Women's Championship
2	Laos	4	1	2	1	3	7	−4	5	2027 ASEAN Women's Championship
3	Singapore	4	1	2	1	5	5	0	5	2027 ASEAN Women's Championship
4	Cambodia	4	1	2	1	5	4	+1	5	
5	Malaysia	2	0	1	1	2	4	−2	1	
6	Timor-Leste	2	0	0	2	1	5	−4	0	
