= Iris de Rouw =

Indonesian footballer (born 2005)

Personal information
- Full name: Iris Joska de Rouw
- Date of birth: 21 April 2005 (age 21)
- Place of birth: Rotterdam, Netherlands
- Height: 1.75 m (5 ft 9 in)
- Position: Goalkeeper

Youth career
- 2019–2022: Sparta Rotterdam

College career
Years	Team	Apps	(Gls)
2025–	St. John's Red Storm		

Senior career*
Years	Team	Apps	(Gls)
2023–2025	Sparta Rotterdam		

International career^{‡}
2025–	Indonesia	12	(0)
- * Club domestic league appearances and goals ‡ National team caps and goals as of 17 December 2025

Iris Joska de Rouw (born 21 April 2005) is a professional footballer who plays as a goalkeeper for NCAA club St. John's University soccer team. Born in the Netherlands, she represents Indonesia at international level.

== Early life ==
Rouw was born in Rotterdam, Netherlands and has Indonesian ancestry from her mother side. Her grandmother's was born Lumajang, East Java.

== Club career ==
De Rouw began her football career when she was 14 years in Sparta Rotterdam for three seasons for its youth team from 2019 to 2022.

In the 2024–25 season, De Rouw was the main goalkeeper for the Jong Sparta Rotterdam team, while she is the second choice goalkeeper in the senior team. Following three season and helped out the team gain a promotion to the Topklasse (Dutch third women's division), De Rouw leave the club.

In June 2025, De Rouw joined the team St. John's University soccer team that plays in the NCAA Division I.

== International career ==
Rouw has opted to represents the Indonesia women's national team. She was called up to the national team for the preparation for the upcoming 2026 AFC Women's Asian Cup qualification. She made her debut against Kyrgzystan women's national team in a 1–0 win.

Rouw was part of the squad that plays in the 2025 SEA Games, where the team finished in fourth place.

== Personal life ==
Rouw was born to a Dutch mother with Indonesia heritage, Brigitte Antoinette Pacherin van der Heijden, born in Geldrop, and her father, Richard Lambertus de Rouw, born in Zaandam. Her maternal grandmother, Christina Salomonson, was born in Lumajang, East Java, Indonesia.

On 10 June 2025, alongside Felicia de Zeuw, Emily Nahon, & Isa Warps, Rouw obtained Indonesian citizenship.

== Career statistics ==
=== International ===
As of match played 17 December 2025

Appearances and goals by national team and year
National team	Year	Apps	Goals
Indonesia	2025	8	0
Total		8	0

== Honours ==
Individual

- PSSI Awards Women's Goalkeeper of the Year: 2026

== See also ==
- List of Indonesia international footballers born outside Indonesia
