= 2029 AFC Women's Asian Cup =

AFC Ayollar Osiyo Kubogi 2029

Tournament details
- Host country: Uzbekistan
- Teams: 12 (from 1 confederation)

The 2029 AFC Women's Asian Cup will be the 22nd edition of the AFC Women's Asian Cup, the quadrennial international football tournament in Asia competed by the women's national teams in the Asian Football Confederation (AFC). This will be the first to be held in Central Asia. It will also be the first edition of the tournament to not be held in the year before the FIFA Women's World Cup since 2003, nor as the final stage of Asian qualification for the 2031 FIFA Women's World Cup. The tournament will also serve as the penultimate stage of Asian qualification for the 2032 Summer Olympics in Brisbane, with all eight quarter-finalists qualifying for the 2032 AFC Women's Olympic Qualifying Tournament.

Japan are the defending champions. This is also the first edition featuring no automatically qualified teams other than the hosts.

== Host selection ==
Uzbekistan was selected as the host nation by the AFC Women's Football Committee on 15 March 2024 as sole bidders.

- Uzbekistan – The country previously had never hosted a major women's football tournament, though it has played in the women's Asian Cup five times. The country has hosted various men's and women's youth competitions, such as the 2008 and 2010 AFC U-16 Championships, the 2022 AFC U-23 Asian Cup, the 2023 AFC U-20 Asian Cup and the 2024 AFC U-20 Women's Asian Cup.

== Qualification ==
The host country Uzbekistan qualified automatically. The remaining 11 teams will be decided by qualification matches to be played in 2028.

This is the first time Japan, Australia and China have to play qualification matches, having directly qualified for every edition between 2006 and 2026 based on previous editions' results.

=== Qualified teams ===
The following teams have qualified for the tournament:

Team	Qualification method	Date of qualification	Appearance(s)				Previous best performance (Note: Bold text indicates they hosted that edition.)	WR
Team	Qualification method	Date of qualification	Total	First	Last	Streak	Previous best performance	WR
Uzbekistan	Host nation	15 May 2024	7th	1995	2026	2	Quarter-finals (2026)	TBD
