= AFF Women's Cup =

Low tier international women's football tournament

- Organiser(s): AFF
- Founded: 2024
- Region: Southeast Asia
- Teams: 6
- Qualifier for: ASEAN Women's Championship
- Current champions: Indonesia (2nd title)
- Most championships: Indonesia (2 titles)
- 2026 AFF Women's Cup

The AFF Women's Cup is an international low tier women's football tournament of the Southeast Asian nations and is sanctioned by the ASEAN Football Federation (AFF). The inaugural edition was held in 2024.

This tournament serves as a qualification for the ASEAN Women's Championship.

== History ==
In 2024, the inaugural edition of the ASEAN Women's Cup was held in Laos.

== Results ==
Keys

- aet: after extra time
- p: penalty shoot-out

Ed.	Year	Host	Final			Third place game			Num. teams
Ed.	Year	Host	Champions	Score	Runners-up	Third place	Score	Fourth place	Num. teams
1	2024	Laos	Indonesia	3–1	Cambodia	Singapore	1–0	Timor-Leste	6
2	2026	Malaysia	Indonesia	5–0	Laos	Singapore	1–1 (4–3 p)	Cambodia	6

== Participating nations ==
Legend

- 1st — Champions
- 2nd — Runners-up
- 3rd — Third place
- 4th — Fourth place
- GS — Group stage
- × — Did not enter / Withdrew / Banned
- — Hosts

For each tournament, the flag of the host country and the number of teams in each finals tournament (in brackets) are shown.

Team	(Laos) 2024 (6)	(Malaysia) 2026 (6)	Total
Cambodia	2nd	4th	2
Indonesia	1st	1st	2
Laos	5th	2nd	2
Malaysia	6th	5th	2
Singapore	3rd	3rd	2
Timor-Leste	4th	6th	2
