= Football at the 2019 SEA Games – Women's tournament =

2019 SEA Games Women's Football Tournament
Tournament details
- Host country: Philippines
- Dates: November 26 – December 8
- Teams: 6 (from 6 associations)
- Venue: 2 (in 2 host cities)

Final positions
- Champions: Vietnam (6th title)
- Runners-up: Thailand
- Third place: Myanmar
- Fourth place: Philippines

Tournament statistics
- Matches played: 10
- Goals scored: 31 (3.1 per match)
- Attendance: 11,484 (1,148 per match)
- Top scorer: (Myanmar) Yee Yee Oo (4 goals)

The women's football tournament at the 2019 SEA Games was the eleventh women's SEA Games football tournament. The tournament was held in Philippines from November 26 to December 8, 2019 where six teams participated. There were no age restrictions on women's teams.

Vietnam won the tournament for the record-breaking sixth time, successfully defending their title in the 2017 SEA Games, thus becoming the most successful team since women's football was added to SEA Games in 1985.

== Competition schedule ==
The following is the competition schedule for the women's football competitions:

G	Group stage	½	Semifinals	B	3rd place play-off	F	Final

Tue 26	Wed 27	Thu 28	Fri 29	Sat 30	Sun 1	Mon 2	Tue 3	Wed 4	Thu 5	Fri 6	Sat 7	Sun 8	
G			G			G			½			B	F

== Venues ==
The matches were played at the Biñan Football Stadium in Biñan, Laguna and the Rizal Memorial Stadium in Manila.

Manila	Biñan	Football at the 2019 SEA Games – Women's tournament (Luzon)
Rizal Memorial Stadium	Biñan Football Stadium	Football at the 2019 SEA Games – Women's tournament (Luzon)
Capacity: 12,873	Capacity: 3,000	Football at the 2019 SEA Games – Women's tournament (Luzon)

== Draw ==
The draw was held on 15 October 2019 at the Sofitel Hotel in Manila. Host Philippines and defending champions, Vietnam were seeded in the Pot 1, Thailand and Myanmar in Pot 2 and Malaysia and Indonesia in Pot 3.

Pot 1	Pot 2	Pot 3
Philippines (H); Vietnam (C)	Thailand; Myanmar	Malaysia; Indonesia

== Squads ==
Indonesia (INA)	Malaysia (MAS)	Myanmar (MYA)	Philippines (PHI)	Thailand (THA)	Vietnam (VIE)
Norffince Boma; Prihatini; Riska Julianti; Ade Mustikiana Oktafiani; Berlyan Asya Pertiwi; Nur Laili Khomariyah; Safira Ika Putri Kartini; Shalika Aurelia Viandrisa; Vivi Oktavia Riski; Anggi Puspita Sari; Baiq Amiatun Shalihah; Jesellaa Arifya Sari; Mayang ZP; Nisma Francida Rusdiana; Octavianti Dwi Nurmalita; Rani Mulyasari; Sabrina Mutiara F.W.; Zahra Muzdalifah; Dewi Tia Safitri; Febriana Kusumaningrum	Shereilynn Elly Pius; Nurul Azurin Mazlan; Usliza Usman; Alice Mic Michael; Malini Nordin; Noor Mianah Balanting; Pedrolia Martin Sikayun; Dadree Rofinus; Norhanisa Yahya; Andrea Lee Xin Yi; Fedalliah Claritta Jaimin Ji; Ainie Tulis; Nurul Izzati Zainol; Sihaya Ajad; Jaciah Jumilis; Asma Junaidi; Nur Faiqah Farid; Eva Olivianie Antinus; Maizura Maurice; Jessica Susanne Mailu	Khin Marlar Tun; Mya Phu Ngon; Khin Than Wai; Khaing Thazin; Ei Yadanar Phyo; Chit Chit; Myat Noe Khin; Khin Mo Mo Tun; Win Theingi Tun; Khin Moe Wai; Yee Yee Oo; Wai Wai Aung; Nge Nge Htwe; July Kyaw; Aye Aye Moe; Nu Nu; May Zin Nwe; Phyu Phyu Win; Thin Thin Yu; San Thaw Thaw	Patrice Impelido; Inna Palacios; Alesa Dolino; Hali Long; Mea Bernal; Claire Lim; Camille Rodriguez; Sara Castañeda; Alisha del Campo; Quinley Quezada; Sarina Bolden; Shelah Cadag; Charisa Lemoran; Kimberly Pariña; Eloiza Fagsao; Eva Madarang; Chelo Hodges; Hazel Lustan; Tara Shelton; Cathrine Graversen	Waraporn Boonsing; Warunee Phetwiset; Phonphirun Pilawan; Natthakarn Chinwong; Khwanrudi Saengchan; Wilaiporn Boothduang; Rattikan Thongsombut; Orapin Waenngoen; Jaruwan Chaiyarak; Kanyanat Chetthabutr; Taneekarn Dangda; Yada Sengyong; Suchawadee Nildhamrong; Saruda Konfay; Sunisa Srangthaisong; Ainon Phancha; Pitsamai Sornsai; Silawan Intamee; Pikul Khueanpet; Kanjana Sungngoen	Huỳnh Như; Trần Thị Kim Thanh; Trần Thị Hồng Nhung; Phạm Thị Tươi; Chương Thị Kiều; Nguyễn Thị Xuyến; Nguyễn Thị Tuyết Dung; Nguyễn Thị Bích Thùy; Dương Thị Vân; Thái Thị Thảo; Trần Thị Phương Thảo; Phạm Hải Yến; Khổng Thị Hằng; Hoàng Thị Loan; Lê Thị Diễm My; Nguyễn Thị Liễu; Vũ Thị Nhung; Trần Nguyễn Bảo Châu; Vũ Thị Thúy; Nguyễn Thị Vạn

== Group stage ==
- All times are Philippine Standard Time (UTC+8).

=== Group A ===
Pos	Team	Pld	W	D	L	GF	GA	GD	Pts	Qualification
1	Myanmar	2	1	1	0	5	0	+5	4 (Note: Fair play points: Myanmar −1, Philippines −3.)	Semi-finals
2	Philippines (H)	2	1	1	0	5	0	+5	4	Semi-finals
3	Malaysia	2	0	0	2	0	10	−10	0	

Source: 2019 SEAG (archived)
Rules for classification: 1) Points; 2) Goal difference; 3) Goals scored; 4) Fair play points
(H) Hosts
Notes:
November 26, 2019
20:00

Philippines	0–0	Myanmar
	Report

Biñan Football Stadium, Biñan
Attendance: 800
Referee: Mi Siyu (China)
November 29, 2019
20:00

Malaysia	0–5	Philippines
	Report	Bolden 25', 42', 45+2'; Del Campo 39'; Madarang 90+3'

Biñan Football Stadium, Biñan
Attendance: 1,600
Referee: Asaka Koizumi (Japan)
December 2, 2019
16:00

Myanmar	5–0	Malaysia
Yee Yee Oo 17', 31', 77'; Khin Marlar Tun 49'; July Kyaw 90'	Report

Biñan Football Stadium, Biñan
Attendance: 282
Referee: Jon Soi Mi (North Korea)

=== Group B ===
Pos	Team	Pld	W	D	L	GF	GA	GD	Pts	Qualification
1	Vietnam	2	1	1	0	7	1	+6	4	Semi-finals
2	Thailand	2	1	1	0	6	2	+4	4	Semi-finals
3	Indonesia	2	0	0	2	1	11	−10	0	

Source: 2019 SEAG (archived)
Rules for classification: 1) Points; 2) Goal difference; 3) Goals scored; 4) Fair play points
November 26, 2019
16:00

Vietnam	1–1	Thailand
Dương Thị Vân 45+1'	Report	Taneekarn 87'

Biñan Football Stadium, Biñan
Attendance: 280
Referee: Choki Om (Bhutan)
November 29, 2019
16:00

Indonesia	0–6	Vietnam
	Report	Nguyễn Thị Tuyết Dung 9', 84'; Nguyễn Thị Vạn 14', 19'; Huỳnh Như 50', 60'

Biñan Football Stadium, Biñan
Attendance: 101
Referee: Cha Min-ji (South Korea)
December 2, 2019
16:00

Thailand	5–1	Indonesia
Kanyanat 2', 18', 29'; Silawan 42'; Suchawadee 51'	Report	Rani 70'

Rizal Memorial Stadium, Manila
Attendance: 250
Referee: Doumouh Al Bakkar (Lebanon)

== Knockout stage ==
Semi-finals
December 5 – Manila
Myanmar	0
Thailand	1
December 5 – Biñan
Vietnam	2
Philippines	0

Gold medal match
December 8 – Manila
Thailand	0
Vietnam (a.e.t.)	1
Bronze medal match
December 8 – Manila
Myanmar	2
Philippines	1

=== Semi-finals ===
December 5, 2019
20:00

Myanmar	0–1	Thailand
	Report	Orapin 78'

Rizal Memorial Stadium, Manila
Attendance: 419
Referee: Saltanat Noroozi (Iran)
December 5, 2019
20:00

Vietnam	2–0	Philippines
Thái Thị Thảo 60'; Nguyễn Thị Tuyết Dung 84'	Report

Biñan Football Stadium, Biñan
Attendance: 2,510
Referee: Mi Siyu (China)

=== Bronze medal match ===
December 8, 2019
16:00

Myanmar	2–1	Philippines
July Kyaw 78'; Yee Yee Oo 80'	Report	Quezada 57'

Rizal Memorial Stadium, Manila
Attendance: 3,000
Referee: Choki Om (Bhutan)

=== Gold medal match ===
December 8, 2019
20:00

Thailand	0–1 (a.e.t.)	Vietnam
	Report	Phạm Hải Yến 92'

Rizal Memorial Stadium, Manila
Attendance: 2,243
Referee: Asaka Koizumi (Japan)

== Winners ==
2019 SEA Games Women's Tournament

Vietnam
Sixth title

== Goalscorers ==
There were 31 goals scored in 10 matches, for an average of 3.1 goals per match.

4 goals

- (Myanmar) Yee Yee Oo

3 goals

- (Philippines) Sarina Bolden
- (Thailand) Kanyanat Chetthabutr
- (Vietnam) Nguyễn Thị Tuyết Dung

2 goals

- (Myanmar) July Kyaw
- (Vietnam) Huỳnh Như
- (Vietnam) Nguyễn Thị Vạn

1 goal

- (Indonesia) Rani Mulyasari
- (Myanmar) Khin Marlar Tun
- (Philippines) Alisha del Campo
- (Philippines) Eva Madarang
- (Philippines) Quinley Quezada
- (Thailand) Orapin Waenngoen
- (Thailand) Silawan Intamee
- (Thailand) Suchawadee Nildhamrong
- (Thailand) Taneekarn Dangda
- (Vietnam) Dương Thị Vân
- (Vietnam) Phạm Hải Yến
- (Vietnam) Thái Thị Thảo

== Final ranking ==
Pos	Team	Pld	W	D	L	GF	GA	GD	Pts	Final result
1	Vietnam	4	3	1	0	10	1	+9	10	Gold Medal
2	Thailand	4	2	1	1	7	3	+4	7	Silver Medal
3	Myanmar	4	2	1	1	7	2	+5	7	Bronze Medal
4	Philippines (H)	4	1	1	2	6	3	+3	4	Fourth place
5	Indonesia	2	0	0	2	1	11	−10	0	Eliminated in group stage
6	Malaysia	2	0	0	2	0	10	−10	0	Eliminated in group stage

(H) Hosts

== See also ==
- Men's tournament
