= Nisa Romyen =

Thai footballer (born 1990)

Personal information
- Full name: Nisa Romyen
- Date of birth: 18 January 1990 (age 36)
- Place of birth: Buriram, Thailand
- Height: 1.65 m (5 ft 5 in)
- Position: Forward

International career^{‡}
Years	Team	Apps	(Gls)
2007–2015	Thailand	48	(32)
Medal record
Women's football
Representing Thailand
Southeast Asian Games
Gold medal – first place	2007 Kuala Lumpur	Team
Silver medal – second place	2009 Vientiane	Team
- ‡ National team caps and goals as of 22:56, 17 June 2015 (UTC)

Nisa Romyen (Thai: นิสา ร่มเย็น born 18 January 1990) is a Thai former international footballer who plays as a forward.

== International goals ==
No.	Date	Venue	Opponent	Score	Result	Competition
1.	2 December 2007	Municipality of Tumbon Mueangpug, Nakhon Ratchasima, Thailand	Malaysia	2–0	6–0	2007 Southeast Asian Games
2.	7 December 2007	Municipality of Tumbon Mueangpug, Nakhon Ratchasima, Thailand	Myanmar	1–2	2–2	2007 Southeast Asian Games
3.	10 December 2007	Municipality of Tumbon Mueangpug, Nakhon Ratchasima, Thailand	Laos	1–0	8–0	2007 Southeast Asian Games
4.	10 December 2007	Municipality of Tumbon Mueangpug, Nakhon Ratchasima, Thailand	Laos	4–0	8–0	2007 Southeast Asian Games
5.	24 March 2008	80th Birthday Stadium, Nakhon Ratchasima, Thailand	Malaysia	5–0	11–0	2008 AFC Women's Asian Cup qualification
6.	24 March 2008	80th Birthday Stadium, Nakhon Ratchasima, Thailand	Malaysia	6–0	11–0	2008 AFC Women's Asian Cup qualification
7.	24 March 2008	80th Birthday Stadium, Nakhon Ratchasima, Thailand	Malaysia	8–0	11–0	2008 AFC Women's Asian Cup qualification
8.	24 March 2008	80th Birthday Stadium, Nakhon Ratchasima, Thailand	Malaysia	11–0	11–0	2008 AFC Women's Asian Cup qualification
9.	26 March 2008	80th Birthday Stadium, Nakhon Ratchasima, Thailand	Philippines	2–0	9–0	2008 AFC Women's Asian Cup qualification
10.	26 March 2008	80th Birthday Stadium, Nakhon Ratchasima, Thailand	Philippines	6–0	9–0	2008 AFC Women's Asian Cup qualification
11.	30 May 2008	Thống Nhất Stadium, Hồ Chí Minh City, Vietnam	China	1–3	1–5	2008 AFC Women's Asian Cup
12.	11 October 2008	Thành Long Sports Centre, Hồ Chí Minh City, Vietnam	Singapore	4–0	6–0	2008 AFF Women's Championship
13.	13 October 2008	Thành Long Sports Centre, Hồ Chí Minh City, Vietnam	Philippines	9–0	12–0	2008 AFF Women's Championship
14.	13 October 2008	Thành Long Sports Centre, Hồ Chí Minh City, Vietnam	Philippines	12–0	12–0	2008 AFF Women's Championship
15.	18 October 2008	Thành Long Sports Centre, Hồ Chí Minh City, Vietnam	Vietnam	1–2	1–2	2008 AFF Women's Championship
16.	20 October 2008	Thành Long Sports Centre, Hồ Chí Minh City, Vietnam	Myanmar	3–0	3–0	2008 AFF Women's Championship
17.	4 July 2009	Rajamangala Stadium, Bangkok, Thailand	Uzbekistan	2–1	6–1	2010 AFC Women's Asian Cup qualification
18.	4 July 2009	Rajamangala Stadium, Bangkok, Thailand	Uzbekistan	3–1	6–1	2010 AFC Women's Asian Cup qualification
19.	8 July 2009	Rajamangala Stadium, Bangkok, Thailand	Iran	2–0	8–1	2010 AFC Women's Asian Cup qualification
20.	8 July 2009	Rajamangala Stadium, Bangkok, Thailand	Iran	5–1	8–1	2010 AFC Women's Asian Cup qualification
21.	8 July 2009	Rajamangala Stadium, Bangkok, Thailand	Iran	6–1	8–1	2010 AFC Women's Asian Cup qualification
22.	4 December 2009	National University of Laos Stadium, Vientiane, Laos	Malaysia	2–0	14–0	2009 Southeast Asian Games
23.	4 December 2009	National University of Laos Stadium, Vientiane, Laos	Malaysia	8–0	14–0	2009 Southeast Asian Games
24.	3 June 2011	Amman International Stadium, Amman, Jordan	Uzbekistan	3–1	5–1	2012 Summer Olympics qualification
25.	3 June 2011	Amman International Stadium, Amman, Jordan	Uzbekistan	5–1	5–1	2012 Summer Olympics qualification
26.	10 June 2011	Amman International Stadium, Amman, Jordan	Jordan	6–0	7–0	2012 Summer Olympics qualification
27.	10 June 2011	Amman International Stadium, Amman, Jordan	Jordan	7–0	7–0	2012 Summer Olympics qualification
28.	17 October 2011	New Laos National Stadium, Vientiane, Laos	Malaysia	1–0	8–1	2011 AFF Women's Championship
29.	17 October 2011	New Laos National Stadium, Vientiane, Laos	Malaysia	2–0	8–1	2011 AFF Women's Championship
30.	17 October 2011	New Laos National Stadium, Vientiane, Laos	Malaysia	3–0	8–1	2011 AFF Women's Championship
31.	19 October 2011	New Laos National Stadium, Vientiane, Laos	Philippines	4–0	5–1	2011 AFF Women's Championship
32.	19 October 2011	New Laos National Stadium, Vientiane, Laos	Philippines	5–0	5–1	2011 AFF Women's Championship
33.	21 October 2011	New Laos National Stadium, Vientiane, Laos	Myanmar	2–1	3–1	2011 AFF Women's Championship
34.	23 October 2011	New Laos National Stadium, Vientiane, Laos	Laos	2–0	4–0	2011 AFF Women's Championship
35.	14 September 2012	Thống Nhất Stadium, Hồ Chí Minh City, Vietnam	Malaysia	2–0	4–0	2012 AFF Women's Championship
36.	21 May 2013	Bangabandhu National Stadium, Dhaka, Bangladesh	Bangladesh	3–0	9–0	2014 AFC Women's Asian Cup qualification
37.	21 May 2013	Bangabandhu National Stadium, Dhaka, Bangladesh	Bangladesh	4–0	9–0	2014 AFC Women's Asian Cup qualification
38.	21 May 2013	Bangabandhu National Stadium, Dhaka, Bangladesh	Bangladesh	8–0	9–0	2014 AFC Women's Asian Cup qualification
39.	21 May 2013	Bangabandhu National Stadium, Dhaka, Bangladesh	Bangladesh	9–0	9–0	2014 AFC Women's Asian Cup qualification
40.	23 May 2013	Bangabandhu National Stadium, Dhaka, Bangladesh	Philippines	1–0	1–0	2014 AFC Women's Asian Cup qualification
41.	25 May 2013	Bangabandhu National Stadium, Dhaka, Bangladesh	Iran	1–0	5–1	2014 AFC Women's Asian Cup qualification
42.	25 May 2013	Bangabandhu National Stadium, Dhaka, Bangladesh	Iran	2–0	5–1	2014 AFC Women's Asian Cup qualification
43.	25 May 2013	Bangabandhu National Stadium, Dhaka, Bangladesh	Iran	5–1	5–1	2014 AFC Women's Asian Cup qualification
44.	11 December 2013	Thuwunna Stadium, Yangon, Myanmar	Jordan	1–0	4–0	2013 AFF Women's Championship
45.	11 December 2013	Thuwunna Stadium, Yangon, Myanmar	Jordan	3–0	4–0	2013 AFF Women's Championship
46.	11 December 2013	Thuwunna Stadium, Yangon, Myanmar	Jordan	4–0	4–0	2013 AFF Women's Championship
47.	17 September 2013	Bogyoke Aung San Stadium, Yangon, Myanmar	Malaysia	2–0	6–0	2013 AFF Women's Championship
48.	17 September 2013	Bogyoke Aung San Stadium, Yangon, Myanmar	Malaysia	4–0	6–0	2013 AFF Women's Championship
49.	17 September 2013	Bogyoke Aung San Stadium, Yangon, Myanmar	Malaysia	5–0	6–0	2013 AFF Women's Championship
50.	17 December 2014	Incheon Namdong Asiad Rugby Field, Incheon, South Korea	Maldives	1–0	10–0	2014 Asian Games
51.	17 December 2014	Incheon Namdong Asiad Rugby Field, Incheon, South Korea	Maldives	3–0	10–0	2014 Asian Games
52.	17 December 2014	Incheon Namdong Asiad Rugby Field, Incheon, South Korea	Maldives	6–0	10–0	2014 Asian Games
53.	21 September 2014	Incheon Namdong Asiad Rugby Field, Incheon, South Korea	India	1–0	10–0	2014 Asian Games
54.	21 September 2014	Incheon Namdong Asiad Rugby Field, Incheon, South Korea	India	2–0	10–0	2014 Asian Games
55.	21 September 2014	Incheon Namdong Asiad Rugby Field, Incheon, South Korea	India	3–0	10–0	2014 Asian Games
56.	21 September 2014	Incheon Namdong Asiad Rugby Field, Incheon, South Korea	India	8–0	10–0	2014 Asian Games
57.	26 September 2014	Goyang Stadium, Goyang, South Korea	Vietnam	1–0	1–2	2014 Asian Games
58.	3 May 2015	Thống Nhất Stadium, Hồ Chí Minh City, Vietnam	Indonesia	1–0	10–1	2015 AFF Women's Championship
59.	3 May 2015	Thống Nhất Stadium, Hồ Chí Minh City, Vietnam	Indonesia	4–0	10–1	2015 AFF Women's Championship
60.	3 May 2015	Thống Nhất Stadium, Hồ Chí Minh City, Vietnam	Indonesia	5–0	10–1	2015 AFF Women's Championship
61.	5 May 2015	Thống Nhất Stadium, Hồ Chí Minh City, Vietnam	Laos	2–0	12–0	2015 AFF Women's Championship
62.	5 May 2015	Thống Nhất Stadium, Hồ Chí Minh City, Vietnam	Laos	3–0	12–0	2015 AFF Women's Championship
63.	5 May 2015	Thống Nhất Stadium, Hồ Chí Minh City, Vietnam	Laos	5–0	12–0	2015 AFF Women's Championship
64.	8 May 2015	Thống Nhất Stadium, Hồ Chí Minh City, Vietnam	Vietnam	1–1	2–1 (a.e.t.)	2015 AFF Women's Championship
65.	8 May 2015	Thống Nhất Stadium, Hồ Chí Minh City, Vietnam	Vietnam	2–1	2–1 (a.e.t.)	2015 AFF Women's Championship
66.	10 May 2015	Thống Nhất Stadium, Hồ Chí Minh City, Vietnam	Myanmar	2–1	3–2	2015 AFF Women's Championship
67.	28 July 2016	Mandalarthiri Stadium, Mandalay, Myanmar	Singapore	6–0	8–0	2016 AFF Women's Championship
68.	20 August 2017	UiTM Stadium, Shah Alam, Malaysia	Malaysia	2–0	6–0	2017 Southeast Asian Games
69.	24 August 2017	UiTM Stadium, Shah Alam, Malaysia	Philippines	2–0	3–1	2017 Southeast Asian Games
