= Huỳnh Như =

Vietnamese footballer (born 1991)

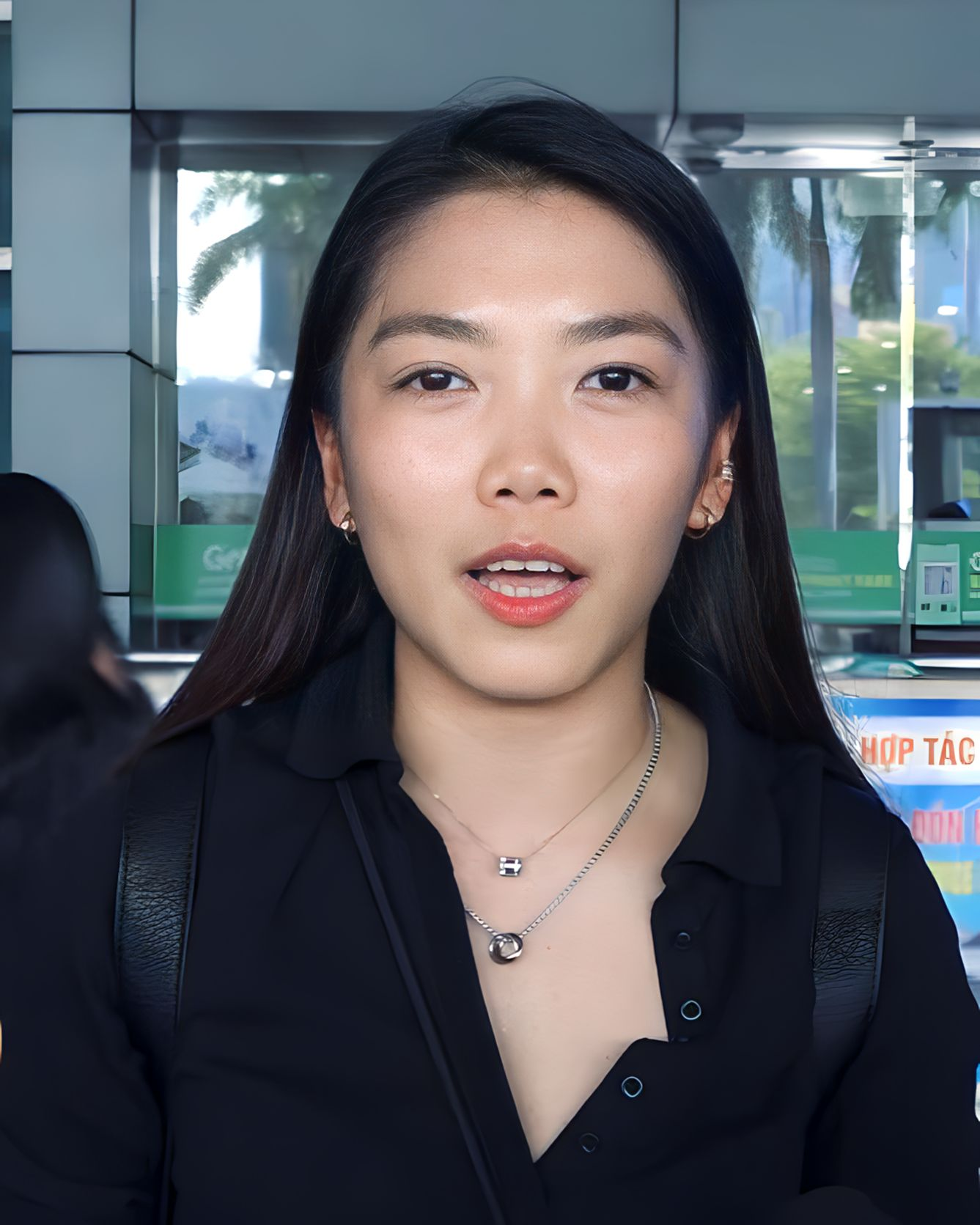
- Huỳnh Như in 2023

Personal information
- Full name: Huỳnh Như
- Date of birth: 28 November 1991 (age 34)
- Place of birth: Châu Thành, Vĩnh Long, Vietnam
- Height: 1.57 m (5 ft 2 in)
- Position: Forward

Team information
- Current team: Hồ Chí Minh City I
- Number: 9

Senior career*
Years	Team	Apps	(Gls)
2007–2022	Hồ Chí Minh City I	152	(105)
2022–2024	Länk FC Vilaverdense	27	(8)
2024–	Hồ Chí Minh City I	3	(3)

International career^{‡}
2011–	Vietnam	121	(70)
Medal record
Representing Vietnam
SEA Games
Gold medal – first place	Kuala Lumpur 2017	Team
Gold medal – first place	Manila 2019	Team
Gold medal – first place	Hanoi 2021	Team
Gold medal – first place	Phnom Penh 2023	Team
Silver medal – second place	Naypyidaw 2013	Team
Silver medal – second place	Bangkok 2025	Team
- * Club domestic league appearances and goals as of 5 February 2024 ‡ National team caps and goals as of 17 December 2025

Huỳnh Như (born 28 November 1991) is a Vietnamese professional footballer who plays as a forward for V-Women's League club Hồ Chí Minh City I and the Vietnam women's national team.

Như is widely regarded as one of the best women players in Vietnamese football history, having played a crucial role in the country's historical qualification to the 2023 FIFA Women's World Cup. She was also the first Vietnamese female footballer to play abroad while signing for Portuguese club Länk FC Vilaverdense in 2022. Như won five Vietnamese Golden Balls and she is currently the best goalscorer of all time for the Vietnam women's national team.

== Club career ==
=== Ho Chi Minh City I ===
Như began her career with the local club Ho Chi Minh City I, making her debut in 2007, where she became an instrument of the club's domination in the semi-professional National League. She played 84 games, scored 62 goals as her club crowned champions on five seasons.

=== Länk FC Vilaverdense ===
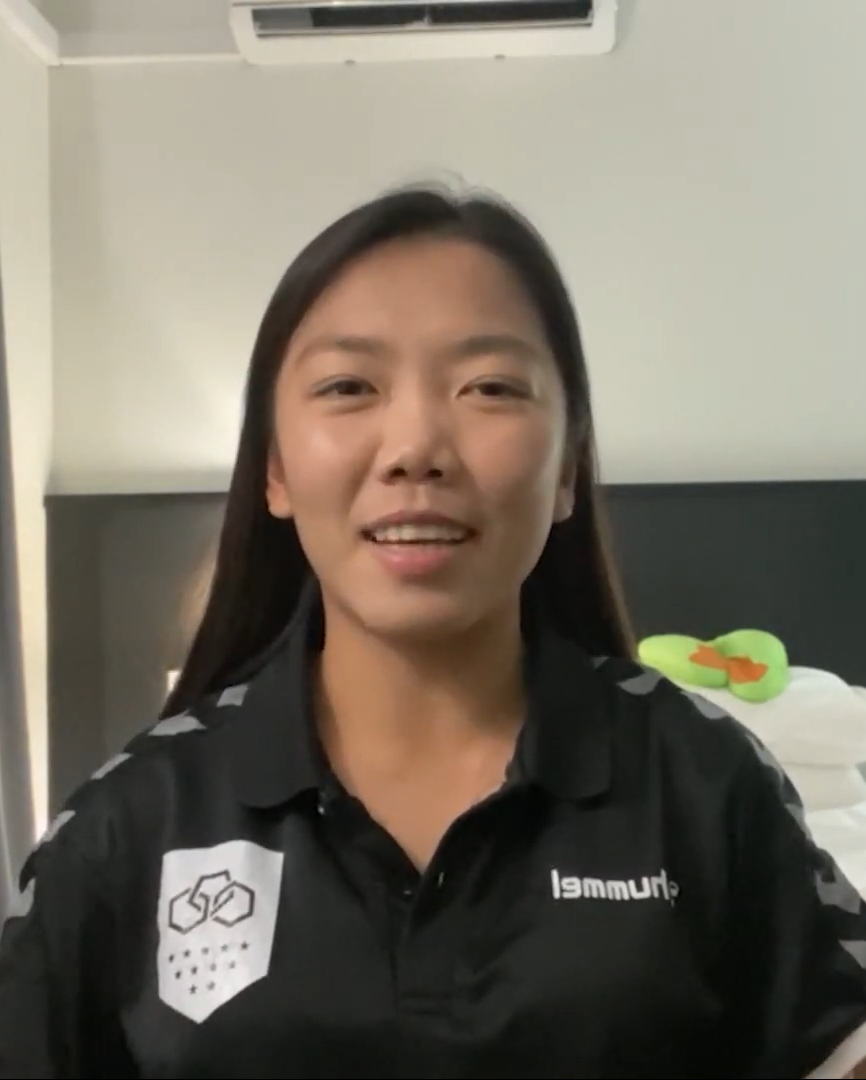
Huỳnh Như in Länk FC Vilaverdense in 2023

In August 2022, Như made history by becoming the first Vietnamese female footballer to play at professional level in Europe, by signing for Portuguese club Länk FC Vilaverdense in the Campeonato Nacional Feminino.

=== Return to Ho Chi Minh City I ===
In August 2024, after her contract with Länk FC Vilaverdense ended, Như returned to Ho Chi Minh City I to compete in the 2024–25 AFC Women's Champions League.

== International career ==
With 70 current goals for the Vietnamese national team, Như is the player with the most goals for the Vietnamese women's national football team.

== Career statistics ==
=== Club ===
As of matches played 5 February 2024

Appearances and goals by club, season and competition
Club	Season	League			National cup (Note: Includes Vietnamese Women's National Cup and Taça de Portugal Feminina)		League cup (Note: Includes Taça da Liga Feminina)		Continental		Total	
Club	Season	Division	Apps	Goals	Apps	Goals	Apps	Goals	Apps	Goals	Apps	Goals
Ho Chi Minh City	2007–22	Vietnamese Women's Championship	52	45	32	18	–		–		84	62
Ho Chi Minh City	Total		52	45	32	18	–		–		84	62
Länk FC Vilaverdense	2022–23	Campeonato Nacional Feminino	18	5	2	2	2	0	–		22	7
Länk FC Vilaverdense	2023-24	Campeonato Nacional Feminino	9	1	2	0	2	0	-		13	1
Länk FC Vilaverdense	Total		27	6	4	2	4	0	–		35	8
Career total			89	51	6	4	4	0	0	0	119	70

=== International ===
Appearances and goals by national team and year

As of match played 17 December 2025

National Team	Year	Apps	Goals
Vietnam	2011	4	5
Vietnam	2012	0	0
Vietnam	2013	11	7
Vietnam	2014	0	0
Vietnam	2015	11	6
Vietnam	2016	10	3
Vietnam	2017	7	9
Vietnam	2018	13	6
Vietnam	2019	16	12
Vietnam	2020	3	1
Vietnam	2021	2	2
Vietnam	2022	18	11
Vietnam	2023	14	6
Vietnam	2024	0	0
Vietnam	2025	12	2
Total		121	70

No.	Cap.	Date	Venue	Opponent	Score	Result	Competition
1.	1.	16 October 2011	New Laos National Stadium, Vientiane, Laos	Singapore	1–0	9–1	2011 AFF Women's Championship
2.	1.	16 October 2011	New Laos National Stadium, Vientiane, Laos	Singapore	7–1	9–1	2011 AFF Women's Championship
3.	1.	16 October 2011	New Laos National Stadium, Vientiane, Laos	Singapore	9–1	9–1	2011 AFF Women's Championship
4.	2.	18 October 2011	New Laos National Stadium, Vientiane, Laos	Laos	1–0	4–0	2011 AFF Women's Championship
5.	4.	25 October 2011	New Laos National Stadium, Vientiane, Laos	Laos	2–0	6–0	2011 AFF Women's Championship
6.	5.	28 April 2013	Vietnam YFT Center, Hanoi, Vietnam	Jordan	1–0	1–0	Friendly
7.	6.	16 May 2013	Amman, Jordan	Jordan	2–0	5–1	Friendly
8.	6.	16 May 2013	Amman, Jordan	Jordan	5–0	5–1	Friendly
9.	9.	24 May 2013	Bahrain National Stadium, Riffa, Bahrain	Kyrgyzstan	11–0	12–0	2014 AFC Women's Asian Cup qualification
10.	9.	24 May 2013	Bahrain National Stadium, Riffa, Bahrain	Kyrgyzstan	12–0	12–0	2014 AFC Women's Asian Cup qualification
11.	12.	13 December 2013	Mandalarthiri Stadium, Mandalay, Myanmar	Philippines	7–0	7–0	2013 Southeast Asian Games
12.	14.	18 December 2013	Mandalarthiri Stadium, Mandalay, Myanmar	Malaysia	4–0	4–0	2013 Southeast Asian Games
13.	16.	2 May 2015	Thống Nhất Stadium, Ho Chi Minh City, Vietnam	Myanmar	1–0	3–2	2015 AFF Women's Championship
14.	16.	2 May 2015	Thống Nhất Stadium, Ho Chi Minh City, Vietnam	Myanmar	2–2	3–2	2015 AFF Women's Championship
15.	17.	4 May 2015	Thống Nhất Stadium, Ho Chi Minh City, Vietnam	Malaysia	1–0	7–0	2015 AFF Women's Championship
16.	17.	4 May 2015	Thống Nhất Stadium, Ho Chi Minh City, Vietnam	Malaysia	4–0	7–0	2015 AFF Women's Championship
17.	24.	18 September 2015	Mandalarthiri Stadium, Mandalay, Myanmar	Myanmar	1–0	4–2	2016 AFC Women's Olympic Qualifying Tournament
18.	24.	18 September 2015	Mandalarthiri Stadium, Mandalay, Myanmar	Myanmar	4–0	4–2	2016 AFC Women's Olympic Qualifying Tournament
19.	32.	7 March 2016	Kincho Stadium, Osaka, Japan	Japan	1–1	1–6	2016 AFC Women's Olympic Qualifying Tournament
20.	35.	30 July 2016	Mandalarthiri Stadium, Mandalay, Myanmar	Thailand	1–0	2–0	2016 AFF Women's Championship
21.	36.	2 August 2016	Mandalarthiri Stadium, Mandalay, Myanmar	Myanmar	1–0	3–3 (a.e.t.) (5–4 p)	2016 AFF Women's Championship
22.	37.	7 April 2017	Vietnam YFT Center, Hanoi, Vietnam	Singapore	2–0	8–0	2018 AFC Women's Asian Cup qualification
23.	37.	7 April 2017	Vietnam YFT Center, Hanoi, Vietnam	Singapore	5–0	8–0	2018 AFC Women's Asian Cup qualification
24.	37.	7 April 2017	Vietnam YFT Center, Hanoi, Vietnam	Singapore	6–0	8–0	2018 AFC Women's Asian Cup qualification
25.	38.	9 April 2017	Vietnam YFT Center, Hanoi, Vietnam	Iran	4–1	6–1	2018 AFC Women's Asian Cup qualification
26.	38.	9 April 2017	Vietnam YFT Center, Hanoi, Vietnam	Iran	6–1	6–1	2018 AFC Women's Asian Cup qualification
27.	39.	11 April 2017	Vietnam YFT Center, Hanoi, Vietnam	Myanmar	2–0	2–0	2018 AFC Women's Asian Cup qualification
28.	40.	17 August 2017	UM Arena Stadium, Shah Alam, Malaysia	Philippines	1–0	3–0	2017 Southeast Asian Games
29.	41.	20 August 2017	UM Arena Stadium, Shah Alam, Malaysia	Myanmar	3–1	3–1	2017 Southeast Asian Games
30.	43.	24 August 2017	UiTM Stadium, Shah Alam, Malaysia	Malaysia	4–0	6–0	2017 Southeast Asian Games
31.	50.	3 July 2018	Jakabaring Stadium, Palembang, Indonesia	Indonesia	1–0	6–0	2018 AFF Women's Championship
32.	50.	3 July 2018	Jakabaring Stadium, Palembang, Indonesia	Indonesia	5–0	6–0	2018 AFF Women's Championship
33.	52.	7 July 2018	Jakabaring Stadium, Palembang, Indonesia	Philippines	2–0	5–0	2018 AFF Women's Championship
34.	52.	7 July 2018	Jakabaring Stadium, Palembang, Indonesia	Philippines	3–0	5–0	2018 AFF Women's Championship
35.	53.	9 July 2018	Jakabaring Stadium, Palembang, Indonesia	Myanmar	1–0	4–3	2018 AFF Women's Championship
36.	53.	9 July 2018	Jakabaring Stadium, Palembang, Indonesia	Myanmar	2–0	4–3	2018 AFF Women's Championship
37.	59.	3 April 2019	Lokomotiv Stadium, Tashkent, Uzbekistan	Uzbekistan	1–0	2–1	2020 AFC Women's Olympic Qualifying Tournament
38.	60.	6 April 2019	Transportation Institute Stadium, Tashkent, Uzbekistan	Hong Kong	2–0	2–1	2020 AFC Women's Olympic Qualifying Tournament
39.	61.	9 April 2019	Transportation Institute Stadium, Tashkent, Uzbekistan	Jordan	1–0	2–0	2020 AFC Women's Olympic Qualifying Tournament
40.	62.	16 August 2019	IPE Chonburi Stadium, Chonburi, Thailand	Cambodia	1–0	10–0	2019 AFF Women's Championship
41.	62.	16 August 2019	IPE Chonburi Stadium, Chonburi, Thailand	Cambodia	3–0	10–0	2019 AFF Women's Championship
42.	63.	18 August 2019	IPE Chonburi Stadium, Chonburi, Thailand	Indonesia	2–0	7–0	2019 AFF Women's Championship
43.	63.	18 August 2019	IPE Chonburi Stadium, Chonburi, Thailand	Indonesia	4–0	7–0	2019 AFF Women's Championship
44.	63.	18 August 2019	IPE Chonburi Stadium, Chonburi, Thailand	Indonesia	5–0	7–0	2019 AFF Women's Championship
45.	65.	25 August 2019	IPE Chonburi Stadium, Chonburi, Thailand	Philippines	1–1	2–1	2019 AFF Women's Championship
46.	66.	27 August 2019	IPE Chonburi Stadium, Chonburi, Thailand	Thailand	1–0	1–0	2019 AFF Women's Championship
47.	70.	29 November 2019	Biñan Football Stadium, Biñan, Philippines	Indonesia	4–0	6–0	2019 Southeast Asian Games
48.	70.	29 November 2019	Biñan Football Stadium, Biñan, Philippines	Indonesia	5–0	6–0	2019 Southeast Asian Games
49.	75.	11 March 2020	Cẩm Phả Stadium, Cẩm Phả, Vietnam	Australia	1–2	1–2	2020 AFC Women's Olympic Qualifying Tournament
50.	76.	23 September 2021	Pamir Stadium, Dushanbe, Tajikistan	Maldives	8–0	16–0	2022 AFC Women's Asian Cup qualification
51.	77.	29 September 2021	Pamir Stadium, Dushanbe, Tajikistan	Tajikistan	3–0	7–0	2022 AFC Women's Asian Cup qualification
52.	80.	27 January 2022	DY Patil Stadium, Navi Mumbai, India	Myanmar	2–2	2–2	2022 AFC Women's Asian Cup
53.	82.	2 February 2022	DY Patil Stadium, Navi Mumbai, India	Thailand	1–0	2–0	2022 AFC Women's Asian Cup
54.	87.	18 May 2022	Cẩm Phả Stadium, Cẩm Phả, Vietnam	Myanmar	1–0	1–0	2021 Southeast Asian Games
55.	88.	21 May 2022	Cẩm Phả Stadium, Cẩm Phả, Vietnam	Thailand	1–0	1–0	2021 Southeast Asian Games
56.	91.	9 May 2022	Biñan Football Stadium, Biñan, Philippines	Laos	2–0	5–0	2022 AFF Women's Championship
57.	91.	9 May 2022	Biñan Football Stadium, Biñan, Philippines	Laos	5–0	5–0	2022 AFF Women's Championship
58.	92.	11 July 2022	Biñan Football Stadium, Biñan, Philippines	Timor-Leste	1–0	6–0	2022 AFF Women's Championship
59.	92.	11 July 2022	Biñan Football Stadium, Biñan, Philippines	Timor-Leste	4–0	6–0	2022 AFF Women's Championship
60.	93.	13 July 2022	Rizal Memorial Stadium, Manila, Philippines	Myanmar	3–0	4–0	2022 AFF Women's Championship
61.	95.	17 July 2022	Rizal Memorial Stadium, Manila, Philippines	Myanmar	1–1	3–4	2022 AFF Women's Championship
62.	95.	17 July 2022	Rizal Memorial Stadium, Manila, Philippines	Myanmar	2–1	3–4	2022 AFF Women's Championship
63.	96.	5 April 2023	Dasarath Rangasala, Kathmandu, Nepal	Nepal	2–0	5–1	2024 AFC Women's Olympic Qualifying Tournament
64.	96.	5 April 2023	Dasarath Rangasala, Kathmandu, Nepal	Nepal	4–0	5–1	2024 AFC Women's Olympic Qualifying Tournament
65.	99.	6 May 2023	RCAF Old Stadium, Phnom Penh, Cambodia	Myanmar	1–0	3–1	2023 Southeast Asian Games
66.	101.	12 May 2023	Olympic Stadium, Phnom Penh, Cambodia	Cambodia	4–0	4–0	2023 Southeast Asian Games
67.	102.	15 May 2023	Olympic Stadium, Phnom Penh, Cambodia	Myanmar	1–0	2–0	2023 Southeast Asian Games
68.	108.	29 October 2023	Lokomotiv Stadium, Tashkent, Uzbekistan	India	1–0	3–1	2024 AFC Women's Olympic Qualifying Tournament
69.	116.	19 August 2025	Lạch Tray Stadium, Hải Phòng, Vietnam	Thailand	2–0	3–1	2025 ASEAN Women's Championship
70.	120.	14 December 2025	IPE Chonburi Stadium, Chonburi, Thailand	Indonesia	5–0	5–0	2025 SEA Games

== Honours ==
Individual

- Vietnamese Women's Golden Ball: 2016, 2019, 2020, 2021, 2022
- Vietnamese Women's Silver Ball: 2018, 2023
- Vietnamese Women's Bronze Ball: 2015, 2017
- Vietnamese Women's Football Championship Top scorer: 2013, 2016, 2017, 2021, 2022
- Vietnamese Women's Football Championship Best of the tournament: 2018, 2019, 2020, 2021
- Women's Vietnamese Cup Best of the tournament: 2020, 2021

Medal

- Labor Order 2nd Class: 2022
