= Thái Thị Thảo =

Vietnamese footballer

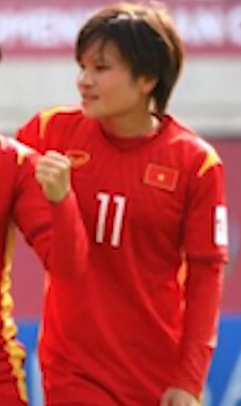
- Thái Thị Thảo in 2022

Personal information
- Date of birth: 12 February 1995 (age 31)
- Place of birth: Đô Lương, Nghệ An, Vietnam
- Height: 1.59 m (5 ft 3 in)
- Position: Midfielder

Team information
- Current team: Hà Nội I
- Number: 16

Senior career*
Years	Team	Apps	(Gls)
2013–	Hà Nội I	89	(17)

International career^{‡}
2014–	Vietnam	52	(13)
- * Club domestic league appearances and goals ‡ National team caps and goals as of 29 September 2021

Thái Thị Thảo (born 12 February 1995) is a Vietnamese footballer who plays as a midfielder for Women's Championship club Hà Nội I and the Vietnam women's national team.

She also played for Vietnam women's national futsal team in 2017 SEA Games.

== International Apps ==
As of match played 28 September 2023

Appearances and goals by national team and year
National Team	Year	Apps	Goals
Vietnam	2018	10	2
Vietnam	2019	16	3
Vietnam	2020	2	0
Vietnam	2021	2	0
Vietnam	2022	5	1
Vietnam	2023	14	1
Total		51	7

== International goals ==
.Scores and results are list Vietnam's goal tally first.

No.	Date	Venue	Opponent	Score	Result	Competition
1.	3 July 2018	Gelora Sriwijaya Stadium, Palembang, Indonesia	Indonesia	4–0	6–0	2018 AFF Women's Championship
2.	7 July 2018	Gelora Sriwijaya Stadium, Palembang, Indonesia	Philippines	5–0	5–0	2018 AFF Women's Championship
3.	20 August 2019	IPE Chonburi Stadium 1, Chonburi, Thailand	Myanmar	2–0	4–0	2019 AFF Women's Championship
4.	6 November 2019	Vietnam YFT Center, Hanoi, Vietnam	India	1–0	1–1	Friendly
5.	5 December 2019	Biñan Football Stadium, Biñan, Philippines	Philippines	1–0	2–0	2019 Southeast Asian Games
6.	2 February 2022	DY Patil Stadium, Navi Mumbai, India	Thailand	2–0	2–0	2022 AFC Women's Asian Cup
7.	25 September 2023	Wenzhou Olympic Sports Center Stadium, Wenzhou, China	Bangladesh	5–0	6–1	2022 Asian Games
8.	2 July 2025	Việt Trì Stadium, Việt Trì, Vietnam	United Arab Emirates	2–0	6–0	2026 AFC Women's Asian Cup qualification
9.	6 August 2025	Lạch Tray Stadium, Haiphong, Vietnam	Cambodia	6–0	6–0	2025 ASEAN Women's Championship
10.	5 December 2025	Chonburi Stadium, Chonburi, Thailand	Malaysia	5–0	7–0	2025 SEA Games
11.	5 December 2025	Chonburi Stadium, Chonburi, Thailand	Malaysia	6–0	7–0	2025 SEA Games
12.	5 December 2025	Chonburi Stadium, Chonburi, Thailand	Malaysia	7–0	7–0	2025 SEA Games
