= 2011 AFF Women's Championship =

Tournament details
- Host country: Laos
- City: Vientiane
- Dates: 16–25 October
- Teams: 8 (from 1 confederation)
- Venues: 2 (in 1 host city)

Final positions
- Champions: Thailand (1st title)
- Runners-up: Myanmar
- Third place: Vietnam
- Fourth place: Laos

Tournament statistics
- Matches played: 16
- Goals scored: 97 (6.06 per match)
- Top scorer(s): (Vietnam) Nguyễn Thị Hòa (9 goals)

The 2011 AFF Women's Championship was held from 16 to 25 October 2011, hosted by Laos. All games were played at the Laos National Stadium and New Laos National Stadium.

Thailand won the tournament for the first time after beating Myanmar 2–1 in the final.

== Group stage ==
- All times are Indochina Time - UTC+7.

=== Group A ===
Team	Pld	W	D	L	GF	GA	GD	Pts
Vietnam	3	3	0	0	27	1	+26	9
Laos (H)	3	2	0	1	16	4	+12	6
Indonesia	3	1	0	2	3	26	−23	3
Singapore	3	0	0	3	2	17	−15	0

(H) Hosts
16 October 2011
16:00

Vietnam	9–1	Singapore
Huỳnh Như 7', 65', 78'; Nguyễn Thị Hòa 11', 28', 45', 74'; Nguyễn Thị Kim Tiến 25'; Lê Thị Thương 37'	Report	Yahya 13'

New Laos National Stadium, Vientiane
16 October 2011
19:00

Indonesia	0–11	Laos
	Report	Sengmany 3'; Phayvanh 15', 22', 37'; Phonhalath 53', 62' (pen.), 90' (pen.); Phasiri 64'; Bounthan 65'; Bouakeo 78'; Sayasanh 84'

New Laos National Stadium, Vientiane

18 October 2011
16:00

Singapore	1–3	Indonesia
Afiqah 84'	Report	Henny 60'; Hamizah 72' (o.g.); Akudiana 90+'

New Laos National Stadium, Vientiane
18 October 2011
19:00

Laos	0–4	Vietnam
	Report	Huỳnh Như 1'; Nguyễn Thị Hòa 8', 29', 33'

New Laos National Stadium, Vientiane

20 October 2011
19:00

Indonesia	0–14	Vietnam
	Report	Nguyễn Thị Liễu 5', 69', 85'; Nguyễn Thị Muôn 5'; Lê Thu Thanh Hương 26', 37', 46'; Phạm Hải Yến 40', 66'; Nguyễn Thị Tuyết Dung 51', 56', 79', 90'; Lê Thị Thủy 75'

Chao Anouvong Stadium, Vientiane
20 October 2011
19:00

Laos	5–0	Singapore
Phonhalath 5'; Phayvanh 33', 53', 60', 88'	Report

New Laos National Stadium, Vientiane

=== Group B ===
Team	Pld	W	D	L	GF	GA	GD	Pts
Thailand	3	3	0	0	16	3	+13	9
Myanmar	3	2	0	1	11	3	+8	6
Philippines	3	0	1	2	3	9	−6	1
Malaysia	3	0	1	2	3	18	−15	1

17 October 2011
16:00

Myanmar	2–0	Philippines
My Nilar Htwe 4', 44'	Report

New Laos National Stadium, Vientiane
17 October 2011
19:00

Thailand	8–1	Malaysia
Nisa 5', 10', 12'; Warunee 28'; Junpen 38', 61' (pen.); Sunisa 49'; Tanekarn 54'	Report	Fatin 85'

New Laos National Stadium, Vientiane

19 October 2011
16:00

Philippines	1–5	Thailand
Nierras 85'	Report	Junpen 10'; Kanjana 29'; Sunisa 44'; Nisa 50', 53'

New Laos National Stadium, Vientiane
19 October 2011
19:00

Malaysia	0–8	Myanmar
	Report	Khin Marlar Tun 5'; Khin Moe Wai 9', 65'; Naw Ar Lo Wer Phaw 38'; San San Maw 51', 58'; Su Su Wai 61'; Yee Yee Oo 62'

New Laos National Stadium, Vientiane

21 October 2011
19:00

Myanmar	1–3	Thailand
Khin Marlar Tun 37'	Report	Kanjana 54'; Nisa 74'; Pajaree 86'

Chao Anouvong Stadium, Vientiane
21 October 2011
19:00

Philippines	2–2	Malaysia
Rodriguez 20'; Nierras 85'	Report	Angela 48'; Fatin 58'

New Laos National Stadium, Vientiane

== Knockout stage ==
Semi-finals
23 October – Vientiane
Vietnam	1
Myanmar	2
23 October – Vientiane
Thailand	4
Laos	0

Final
25 October – Vientiane
Myanmar	1
Thailand	2
Third Place
25 October – Vientiane
Vietnam	6
Laos	0

=== Semi-finals ===
23 October 2011
16:00

Vietnam	1–2	Myanmar
Lê Thị Thương 43'	Report	Than Than Htwe 60'; Naw Ar Lo Wer Phaw 79'

New Laos National Stadium, Vientiane
Referee: Abirami Naidu (Singapore)

23 October 2011
19:00

Thailand	4–0	Laos
Anootsara 53', 63', 72'; Nisa 56'	Report

New Laos National Stadium, Vientiane
Referee: Thein Thein Aye (Myanmar)

=== Third place match ===
25 October 2011
16:00

Vietnam	6–0	Laos
Lê Thị Thương 1'; Huỳnh Như 3'; Nguyễn Thị Hòa 40', 71'; Chương Thị Kiều 57' (pen.); Lê Thu Thanh Hương 70'	Report

New Laos National Stadium, Vientiane
Referee: Boonpasit Patchaya (Thailand)

=== Final ===
25 October 2011
19:00

Myanmar	1–2	Thailand
Yee Yee Oo 89'	Report	Junpen 25'; Kanjana 38'

New Laos National Stadium, Vientiane
Referee: Công Thị Dung (Vietnam)

== Awards ==
2011 AFF Women's Championship champions

Thailand
First title

== Goalscorers ==
9 goals

- (Vietnam) Nguyễn Thị Hòa

7 goals

- (Laos) Souphavanh Phayvanh
- (Thailand) Nisa Romyen

5 goals

- (Vietnam) Huỳnh Như

4 goals

- (Laos) Sochitta Phonhalath
- (Thailand) Junpen Seesraum
- (Vietnam) Nguyễn Thị Tuyết Dung
- (Vietnam) Lê Thu Thanh Hương

3 goals

- (Thailand) Kanjana Sung-Ngoen
- (Thailand) Anootsara Maijarern
- (Vietnam) Lê Thị Thương
- (Vietnam) Phạm Hải Yến

2 goals

- (Malaysia) Fatin Shahida Azmi
- (Myanmar) My Nilar Htwe
- (Myanmar) San San Maw
- (Myanmar) Yee Yee Oo
- (Myanmar) Naw Ar Lo Wer Phaw
- (Myanmar) Khin Moe Wai
- (Philippines) Samantha Nierras
- (Thailand) Sunisa Srangthaisong
- (Vietnam) Nguyễn Thị Liễu

1 goal

- (Indonesia) Henny Hardiana Yigibalom
- (Indonesia) Akudiana Tebai
- (Laos) Lololy Bouakeo
- (Laos) Manivanh Bounthan
- (Laos) Soutdaoloung Phasiri
- (Laos) Johnny Sayasanh
- (Laos) Ting Sengmany
- (Malaysia) Angela Kais
- (Myanmar) Khin Marlar Tun
- (Myanmar) Su Su Wai
- (Philippines) Kathleen Rodriguez
- (Singapore) Noor Fatin Afiqah
- (Singapore) Siti Liyana Yahya
- (Thailand) Pajaree Thaoto
- (Thailand) Taneekarn Dangda
- (Thailand) Warunee Phetwiset
- (Vietnam) Chương Thị Kiều
- (Vietnam) Nguyễn Thị Kim Tiến
- (Vietnam) Lê Thị Thuy
- (Vietnam) Nguyễn Thị Muôn

1 own goal

- (Singapore) Hamizah Abdul Talib (against Indonesia)

== Final ranking ==
Pos	Team	Pld	W	D	L	GF	GA	GD	Pts	Final result
1	Thailand	5	5	0	0	22	4	+18	15	Champions
2	Myanmar	5	3	0	2	14	6	+8	9	Runners-up
3	Vietnam	5	4	0	1	34	3	+31	12	Third place
4	Laos (H)	5	2	0	3	16	14	+2	6	Fourth place
5	Indonesia	3	1	0	2	3	26	−23	3	Eliminated in group stage
6	Philippines	3	0	1	2	3	9	−6	1	Eliminated in group stage
7	Malaysia	3	0	1	2	3	18	−15	1	Eliminated in group stage
8	Singapore	3	0	0	3	2	17	−15	0	Eliminated in group stage

(H) Hosts
