= Pitsamai Sornsai =

Thai footballer (born 1989)

Personal information
- Full name: Pitsamai Sornsai
- Date of birth: January 19, 1989 (age 37)
- Place of birth: Loei, Thailand
- Height: 1.72 m (5 ft 7 1/2 in)
- Positions: Attacking midfielder; forward

Team information
- Current team: Taichung Blue Whale
- Number: 19

Senior career*
| Years | Team | Apps | (Gls) |
| 2009–2012 | G.H. Bank RBAC | 12 | (21) |
| 2013 | Chonburi–Sriprathum | | |
| 2013 | Speranza F.C. Osaka-Takatsuki | | |
| 2017 | Chonburi | 4 | (2) |
| 2020 | Inter Taoyuan FC | 6 | (0) |
| 2021–2022 | Taichung Blue Whale | 18 | (5) |
| 2022-2024 | Chonburi | | |
| 2024- | Taichung Blue Whale | 32 | (6) |

International career
| 2005– | Thailand | 125 | (45) |
- * Club domestic league appearances and goals

Pitsamai Sornsai (Thai: พิสมัย สอนไสย์) is a Thai footballer who plays as a forward for Taichung Blue Whale.

== Career statistics ==
=== Club ===
| Club | Season | Division | League | | Cup | | Continental | | Total | |
| Club | Season | Division | Apps | Goals | Apps | Goals | Apps | Goals | Apps | Goals |
|---|---|---|---|---|---|---|---|---|---|---|
| Bank RBAC | 2009 | Thai Women's League | 12 | 21 | | | | | 12 | 21 |
| Chonburi | 2017 | Thai Women's League | 4 | 2 | | | | | 4 | 2 |
| Inter Taoyuan | 2020 | Thai Women's League | 6 | 0 | | | | | 6 | 0 |
| Taichung Blue Whale | 2021 | Mulan League | 10 | 4 | | | | | 10 | 4 |
| Taichung Blue Whale | 2022 | Mulan League | 8 | 1 | 1 | 0 | 2 | 0 | 11 | 1 |
| Taichung Blue Whale | 2024 | Mulan League | 14 | 0 | | | 3 | 0 | 17 | 0 |
| Taichung Blue Whale | 2025-26 | Mulan League | 18 | 6 | 6 | 3 | 1 | 0 | 25 | 9 |
| Taichung Blue Whale | Total | | 50 | 11 | 7 | 3 | 6 | 0 | 63 | 14 |
| Career total | | | 72 | 34 | 7 | 3 | 6 | 0 | 85 | 37 |

== International goals ==
| No. | Date | Venue | Opponent | Score | Result | Competition |
|---|---|---|---|---|---|---|
| 1. | 24 November 2005 | Marikina Sports Complex, Marikina, Philippines | Philippines | 1–0 | 1–0 | 2005 Southeast Asian Games |
| 2. | 2 December 2007 | Municipality of Tumbon Mueangpug Stadium, Nakhon Ratchasima, Thailand | Malaysia | 4–0 | 6–0 | 2007 Southeast Asian Games |
| 3. | 10 December 2007 | Municipality of Tumbon Mueangpug Stadium, Nakhon Ratchasima, Thailand | Laos | 6–0 | 8–0 | 2007 Southeast Asian Games |
| 4. | 13 December 2007 | Nakhon Ratchasima Municipal Stadium, Nakhon Ratchasima, Thailand | Vietnam | 1–0 | 2–0 | 2007 Southeast Asian Games |
| 5. | 24 March 2008 | 80th Birthday Stadium, Nakhon Ratchasima, Thailand | Malaysia | 1–0 | 11–0 | 2008 AFC Women's Asian Cup qualification |
| 6. | 24 March 2008 | 80th Birthday Stadium, Nakhon Ratchasima, Thailand | Malaysia | 2–0 | 11–0 | 2008 AFC Women's Asian Cup qualification |
| 7. | 24 March 2008 | 80th Birthday Stadium, Nakhon Ratchasima, Thailand | Malaysia | 3–0 | 11–0 | 2008 AFC Women's Asian Cup qualification |
| 8. | 24 March 2008 | 80th Birthday Stadium, Nakhon Ratchasima, Thailand | Malaysia | 7–0 | 11–0 | 2008 AFC Women's Asian Cup qualification |
| 9. | 26 March 2008 | 80th Birthday Stadium, Nakhon Ratchasima, Thailand | Philippines | 3–0 | 9–0 | 2008 AFC Women's Asian Cup qualification |
| 10. | 26 March 2008 | 80th Birthday Stadium, Nakhon Ratchasima, Thailand | Philippines | 5–0 | 9–0 | 2008 AFC Women's Asian Cup qualification |
| 11. | 26 March 2008 | 80th Birthday Stadium, Nakhon Ratchasima, Thailand | Philippines | 7–0 | 9–0 | 2008 AFC Women's Asian Cup qualification |
| 12. | 13 October 2008 | Thành Long Sports Centre, Hồ Chí Minh City, Vietnam | Philippines | 8–0 | 12–0 | 2008 AFF Women's Championship |
| 13. | 13 October 2008 | Thành Long Sports Centre, Hồ Chí Minh City, Vietnam | Philippines | 10–0 | 12–0 | 2008 AFF Women's Championship |
| 14. | 4 December 2009 | National University of Laos Stadium, Vientiane, Laos | Malaysia | 4–0 | 14–0 | 2009 Southeast Asian Games |
| 15. | 4 December 2009 | National University of Laos Stadium, Vientiane, Laos | Malaysia | 10–0 | 14–0 | 2009 Southeast Asian Games |
| 16. | 4 December 2009 | National University of Laos Stadium, Vientiane, Laos | Malaysia | 14–0 | 14–0 | 2009 Southeast Asian Games |
| 17. | 8 December 2009 | National University of Laos Stadium, Vientiane, Laos | Laos | 1–0 | 4–1 | 2009 Southeast Asian Games |
| 18. | 22 March 2011 | Kaohsiung National Stadium, Kaohsiung, Taiwan | Myanmar | 2–0 | 2–0 | 2012 Summer Olympics qualification |
| 19. | 24 March 2011 | Kaohsiung National Stadium, Kaohsiung, Taiwan | Hong Kong | 4–0 | 4–0 | 2012 Summer Olympics qualification |
| 20. | 3 June 2011 | Amman International Stadium, Amman, Jordan | Uzbekistan | 1–1 | 5–1 | 2012 Summer Olympics qualification |
| 21. | 3 June 2011 | Amman International Stadium, Amman, Jordan | Uzbekistan | 4–1 | 5–1 | 2012 Summer Olympics qualification |
| 22. | 10 June 2011 | Amman International Stadium, Amman, Jordan | Jordan | 4–0 | 7–0 | 2012 Summer Olympics qualification |
| 23. | 17 September 2014 | Incheon Namdong Asiad Rugby Field, Incheon, South Korea | Maldives | 2–0 | 10–0 | 2014 Asian Games |
| 24. | 17 September 2014 | Incheon Namdong Asiad Rugby Field, Incheon, South Korea | Maldives | 5–0 | 10–0 | 2014 Asian Games |
| 25. | 17 September 2014 | Incheon Namdong Asiad Rugby Field, Incheon, South Korea | Maldives | 6–0 | 10–0 | 2014 Asian Games |
| 26. | 17 September 2014 | Incheon Namdong Asiad Rugby Field, Incheon, South Korea | Maldives | 10–0 | 10–0 | 2014 Asian Games |
| 27. | 21 September 2014 | Incheon Namdong Asiad Rugby Field, Incheon, South Korea | India | 9–0 | 10–0 | 2014 Asian Games |
| 28. | 26 July 2016 | Mandalarthiri Stadium, Mandalay, Myanmar | Philippines | 1–0 | 4–0 | 2016 AFF Women's Championship |
| 29. | 26 July 2016 | Mandalarthiri Stadium, Mandalay, Myanmar | Philippines | 2–0 | 4–0 | 2016 AFF Women's Championship |
| 30. | 5 October 2016 | Kaohsiung National Stadium, Kaohsiung, Taiwan | Chinese Taipei | 5–2 | 5–2 | Friendly |
| 31. | 10 June 2017 | PAT Stadium, Bangkok, Thailand | Chinese Taipei | 4–1 | 4–1 | Friendly |
| 32. | 24 August 2017 | UiTM Stadium, Shah Alam, Malaysia | Philippines | 3–0 | 3–1 | 2017 Southeast Asian Games |
| 33. | 9 April 2018 | King Abdullah II Stadium, Amman, Jordan | Jordan | 6–1 | 6–1 | 2018 AFC Women's Asian Cup |
| 34. | 2 July 2018 | Bumi Sriwijaya Stadium, Palembang, Indonesia | Timor-Leste | 4–0 | 8–0 | 2018 AFF Women's Championship |
| 35. | 2 July 2018 | Bumi Sriwijaya Stadium, Palembang, Indonesia | Timor-Leste | 6–0 | 8–0 | 2018 AFF Women's Championship |
| 36. | 2 July 2018 | Bumi Sriwijaya Stadium, Palembang, Indonesia | Timor-Leste | 7–0 | 8–0 | 2018 AFF Women's Championship |
| 37. | 2 July 2018 | Bumi Sriwijaya Stadium, Palembang, Indonesia | Timor-Leste | 8–0 | 8–0 | 2018 AFF Women's Championship |
| 38. | 4 July 2018 | Bumi Sriwijaya Stadium, Palembang, Indonesia | Cambodia | 6–0 | 11–0 | 2018 AFF Women's Championship |
| 39. | 6 July 2018 | Bumi Sriwijaya Stadium, Palembang, Indonesia | Malaysia | 7–0 | 8–0 | 2018 AFF Women's Championship |
| 40. | 6 July 2018 | Bumi Sriwijaya Stadium, Palembang, Indonesia | Malaysia | 8–0 | 8–0 | 2018 AFF Women's Championship |
| 41. | 11 July 2018 | Bumi Sriwijaya Stadium, Palembang, Indonesia | Myanmar | 2–1 | 3–1 | 2018 AFF Women's Championship |
| 42. | 19 August 2018 | Bumi Sriwijaya Stadium, Palembang, Indonesia | Vietnam | 2–3 | 2–3 | 2018 Asian Games |
| 43. | 19 August 2019 | IPE Chonburi Stadium, Chonburi, Thailand | Timor-Leste | 6–0 | 9–0 | 2019 AFF Women's Championship |
| 44. | 25 August 2019 | IPE Chonburi Stadium, Chonburi, Thailand | Myanmar | 1–0 | 3–1 | 2019 AFF Women's Championship |
| 45. | 17 December 2025 | Chonburi Stadium, Chonburi, Thailand | Indonesia | 1–0 | 2–0 | 2025 Southeast Asian Games |

== Footballing honours ==
=== International ===
Thailand

- AFC Women's Championship: fifth place: 2014
- AFC Women's U-17 Championship: third place: 2005
- AFF Women's Championship: 2011
  - runner-up: 2007
  - third place: 2008, 2012
- Southeast Asian Games Gold Medal: 2007, 2013
  - Silver Medal: 2009

=== Clubs ===
RBAC

- Thai Women's Premier League: 2009, 2010

=== Individual ===
- Thai Women's Premier League Top Scorer: 2009 (21 goals)
- Southeast Asian Games Top Scorer: 2009
