= Vũ Thị Nhung =

Vietnamese footballer

Personal information
- Date of birth: 9 July 1992 (age 34)
- Place of birth: Gia Lâm, Hanoi, Vietnam
- Height: 1.53 m (5 ft 0 in)
- Position: Midfielder

Team information
- Current team: Hà Nội I
- Number: 21

Senior career*
Years	Team	Apps	(Gls)
2008–	Hà Nội I	71	(23)

International career^{‡}
2010–	Vietnam	43	(12)
- * Club domestic league appearances and goals ‡ National team caps and goals as of 21 May 2014

Vũ Thị Nhung (born 9 July 1992) is a Vietnamese footballer who plays as a midfielder for Women's Championship club Hà Nội I and the Vietnam women's national team.

== International goals ==
Scores and results list Vietnam's goal tally first.

No.	Date	Venue	Opponent	Score	Result	Competition
1.	7 April 2017	Vietnam YFT Center, Hanoi, Vietnam	Singapore	3–0	8–0	2018 AFC Women's Asian Cup qualification
2.	24 August 2017	UiTM Stadium, Shah Alam, Malaysia	Malaysia	1–0	6–0	2017 Southeast Asian Games
3.	3 November 2019	Vietnam YFT Center, Hanoi, Vietnam	India	1–0	3–0	Friendly
