= Football at the 2017 SEA Games – Women's tournament =

2017 SEA Games Women's Football Tournament
Tournament details
- Host country: Malaysia
- Dates: 15–24 August
- Teams: 5 (from 5 associations)
- Venues: 2 (in 2 host cities)

Final positions
- Champions: Vietnam (5th title)
- Runners-up: Thailand
- Third place: Myanmar
- Fourth place: Philippines

Tournament statistics
- Matches played: 10
- Goals scored: 44 (4.4 per match)
- Top scorer(s): (Myanmar) Win Theingi Tun (6 goals)

The women's football tournament at the 2017 SEA Games was the tenth women's SEA Games football tournament. The tournament was held in Malaysia from 20 to 28 August 2017 where five teams participated in a round-robin format. There were no age restrictions on women's teams.

Vietnam won the tournament for the record-tying fifth time, after waiting for eight years since their last victory in the 2009 Southeast Asian Games.

== Competition schedule ==
The following was the competition schedule for the women's football competitions:

G	Group stage

Tue 15	Wed 16	Thu 17	Fri 18	Sat 19	Sun 20	Mon 21	Tue 22	Wed 23	Thu 24
G		G			G		G		G

== Participating nations ==
The following five teams participated for the competition.

- Malaysia (MAS)
- Myanmar (MYA)
- Philippines (PHI)
- Thailand (THA)
- Vietnam (VIE)

== Venues ==
The tournament was held in two venues:

- UiTM Stadium, Shah Alam
- UM Arena Stadium, Kuala Lumpur

== Results ==
- All times are Malaysia Standard Time (UTC+8).

Pos	Team	Pld	W	D	L	GF	GA	GD	Pts	Final Result
1	Vietnam	4	3	1	0	13	2	+11	10	Gold medal
2	Thailand	4	3	1	0	13	4	+9	10	Silver medal
3	Myanmar	4	2	0	2	14	6	+8	6	Bronze medal
4	Philippines	4	1	0	3	3	13	−10	3	
5	Malaysia (H)	4	0	0	4	1	19	−18	0	

Source: Schedule
Rules for classification: 1) Points; 2) Goal difference; 3) Goals scored; More: Technical Handbook
(H) Hosts
15 August 2017
16:00

Thailand	3–2	Myanmar
Rattikan 65', 71'; Orathai 88'	Report	Win Theingi Tun 23', 77'

UM Arena Stadium, Kuala Lumpur
Referee: Kim Jye Hye (South Korea)
15 August 2017
20:45

Malaysia	1–2	Philippines
Rofinus 51'	Report	Impelido 45'; Rodriguez 73'

UiTM Stadium, Shah Alam
Referee: Law Bik Chi (Hong Kong)

17 August 2017
16:00

Philippines	0–3	Vietnam
	Report	Huỳnh Như 65'; Nguyễn Thị Tuyết Dung 84'; Nguyễn Thị Muôn 90+4'

UM Arena Stadium, Kuala Lumpur
Referee: Yu Hong (China)
17 August 2017
20:45

Myanmar	5–0	Malaysia
Athinah 47' (o.g.); Win Theingi Tun 63', 77'; Khin Moe Wai 73', 79'	Report

UiTM Stadium, Shah Alam
Referee: Choki Om (Bhutan)

20 August 2017
16:00

Vietnam	3–1	Myanmar
Phạm Hải Yến 19'; Nguyễn Thị Bích Thùy 73'; Huỳnh Như 83'	Report	Win Theingi Tun 59'

UM Arena Stadium, Kuala Lumpur
Referee: Kim Jye Hye (South Korea)
20 August 2017
20:45

Thailand	6–0	Malaysia
Orathai 19', 57'; Nisa 54'; Naphat 58'; Saowalak 60'; Taneekarn 90+1'	Report

UiTM Stadium, Shah Alam
Referee: Ashmita Manandhar (Nepal)

22 August 2017
16:00

Vietnam	1–1	Thailand
Phạm Hải Yến 11'	Report	Rattikan 41'

UiTM Stadium, Shah Alam
Referee: Choki Om (Bhutan)
22 August 2017
16:00

Myanmar	6–0	Philippines
Khin Moe Wai 4', 80', 90+4'; Win Theingi Tun 16'; Yee Yee Oo 18'; Naw Ar Lo Wer Phaw 19'	Report

UM Arena Stadium, Kuala Lumpur
Referee: Yu Hong (China)

24 August 2017
16:00

Thailand	3–1	Philippines
Rattikan 38'; Nisa 67'; Pitsamai 72'	Report	Long 90+1'

UiTM Stadium, Shah Alam
Referee: Ashmita Manandhar (Nepal)
24 August 2017
20:45

Malaysia	0–6	Vietnam
	Report	Vũ Thị Nhung 7'; Nguyễn Thị Liễu 13', 79'; Nguyễn Thị Muôn 40', 54'; Huỳnh Như 45'

UiTM Stadium, Shah Alam
Referee: Law Bik Chi (Hong Kong)

== Winners ==
2017 SEA Games Women's Tournament

Vietnam
Fifth title

== Goalscorers ==
6 goals

- (Myanmar) Win Theingi Tun

5 goals

- (Myanmar) Khin Moe Wai

4 goals

- (Thailand) Rattikan Thongsombut

3 goals

- (Thailand) Orathai Srimanee
- (Vietnam) Huỳnh Như
- (Vietnam) Nguyễn Thị Muôn

2 goals

- (Thailand) Nisa Romyen
- (Vietnam) Nguyễn Thị Liễu
- (Vietnam) Phạm Hải Yến

1 goal

- (Malaysia) Dadree Rofinus
- (Myanmar) Naw Ar Lo Wer Phaw
- (Myanmar) Yee Yee Oo
- (Philippines) Patrice Impelido
- (Philippines) Hali Long
- (Philippines) Camille Rodriguez
- (Thailand) Naphat Seesraum
- (Thailand) Pitsamai Sornsai
- (Thailand) Saowalak Pengngam
- (Thailand) Taneekarn Dangda
- (Vietnam) Nguyễn Thị Bích Thùy
- (Vietnam) Nguyễn Thị Tuyết Dung
- (Vietnam) Vũ Thị Nhung

Own goal

- (Malaysia) Nur Athinah Farhanah

== See also ==
- Men's tournament
