= Nguyễn Thị Muôn =

Vietnamese footballer

Personal information
- Date of birth: 7 October 1988 (age 38)
- Place of birth: Thường Tín, Hanoi, Vietnam
- Height: 1.57 m (5 ft 2 in)
- Position: Midfielder

Senior career*
Years	Team	Apps	(Gls)
2005–2022	Hà Nội I	85	(3)

International career^{‡}
2010–2020	Vietnam	48	(23)
- * Club domestic league appearances and goals ‡ National team caps and goals as of 10:11, 22 March 2015 (UTC)

Nguyễn Thị Muôn (born 7 October 1988) is a Vietnamese footballer who plays as a midfielder for Hà Nội I.

== International goals ==
No.	Date	Venue	Opponent	Score	Result	Competition
1.	8 July 2009	Thành Long Sports Centre, Ho Chi Minh City, Vietnam	Hong Kong	7–0	7–0	2010 AFC Women's Asian Cup qualification
2.	17 October 2009	Cửa Ông Stadium, Cẩm Phả, Vietnam	Laos	1–0	5–0	Friendly
3.	6 December 2009	National University of Laos Stadium, Vientiane, Laos	Malaysia	2–0	8–0	2009 Southeast Asian Games
4.	6 December 2009	National University of Laos Stadium, Vientiane, Laos	Malaysia	6–0	8–0	2009 Southeast Asian Games
5.	11 December 2009	National University of Laos Stadium, Vientiane, Laos	Thailand	1–0	2–2	2009 Southeast Asian Games
6.	14 November 2010	Guangzhou Higher Education Mega Center Central Stadium, Guangzhou, China	South Korea	1–0	1–6	2010 Asian Games
7.	18 November 2010	Huangpu Sports Center, Guangzhou, China	Jordan	2–0	3–0	2010 Asian Games
8.	22 May 2013	Bahrain National Stadium, Riffa, Bahrain	Bahrain	4–0	8–0	2014 AFC Women's Asian Cup qualification
9.	22 May 2013	Bahrain National Stadium, Riffa, Bahrain	Bahrain	6–0	8–0	2014 AFC Women's Asian Cup qualification
10.	22 May 2013	Bahrain National Stadium, Riffa, Bahrain	Bahrain	8–0	8–0	2014 AFC Women's Asian Cup qualification
11.	24 May 2013	Bahrain National Stadium, Riffa, Bahrain	Kyrgyzstan	7–0	12–0	2014 AFC Women's Asian Cup qualification
12.	15 September 2013	Thuwunna Stadium, Yangon, Myanmar	Jordan	4–0	4–0	2013 AFF Women's Championship
13.	14 May 2014	Thống Nhất Stadium, Ho Chi Minh City, Vietnam	Jordan	1–0	3–1	2014 AFC Women's Asian Cup
14.	26 July 2016	Mandalarthiri Stadium, Mandalay, Myanmar	Singapore	3–0	14–0	2016 AFF Women's Championship
15.	26 July 2016	Mandalarthiri Stadium, Mandalay, Myanmar	Singapore	7–0	14–0	2016 AFF Women's Championship
16.	26 July 2016	Mandalarthiri Stadium, Mandalay, Myanmar	Singapore	8–0	14–0	2016 AFF Women's Championship
17.	26 July 2016	Mandalarthiri Stadium, Mandalay, Myanmar	Singapore	10–0	14–0	2016 AFF Women's Championship
18.	26 July 2016	Mandalarthiri Stadium, Mandalay, Myanmar	Singapore	11–0	14–0	2016 AFF Women's Championship
19.	26 July 2016	Mandalarthiri Stadium, Mandalay, Myanmar	Singapore	12–0	14–0	2016 AFF Women's Championship
20.	5 April 2017	Vietnam YFT Center, Hanoi, Vietnam	Syria	9–0	11–0	2018 AFC Women's Asian Cup qualification
21.	17 August 2017	UM Arena Stadium, Kuala Lumpur, Malaysia	Philippines	3–0	3–0	2017 Southeast Asian Games
22.	24 August 2017	UiTM Stadium, Shah Alam, Malaysia	Malaysia	3–0	6–0	2017 Southeast Asian Games
23.	24 August 2017	UiTM Stadium, Shah Alam, Malaysia	Malaysia	5–0	6–0	2017 Southeast Asian Games
