= Nguyễn Thị Liễu =

Vietnamese footballer

Personal information
- Date of birth: 18 September 1992 (age 34)
- Place of birth: Lý Nhân, Hà Nam, Vietnam
- Height: 1.53 m (5 ft 0 in)
- Position: Midfielder

Team information
- Current team: Phong Phú Hà Nam
- Number: 8

Senior career*
Years	Team	Apps	(Gls)
2010–	Phong Phú Hà Nam	143	(52)

International career^{‡}
2011–	Vietnam	77	(14)
- * Club domestic league appearances and goals ‡ National team caps and goals as of 10:09, 10 July 2023 (UTC)

Nguyễn Thị Liễu (born 18 September 1992) is a Vietnamese former footballer who played as a midfielder club Phong Phú Hà Nam and Vietnam women's national football team.

== International goals ==
No.	Date	Venue	Opponent	Score	Result	Competition
1.	20 October 2011	Chao Anouvong Stadium, Vientiane, Laos	Indonesia	1–0	14–0	2011 AFF Women's Championship
2.	20 October 2011	Chao Anouvong Stadium, Vientiane, Laos	Indonesia	?–0	14–0	2011 AFF Women's Championship
3.	22 May 2013	Bahrain National Stadium, Riffa, Bahrain	Bahrain	5–0	8–0	2014 AFC Women's Asian Cup qualification
4.	26 September 2014	Goyang Stadium, Goyang, South Korea	Thailand	1–1	2–1	2014 Asian Games
5.	8 May 2015	Thống Nhất Stadium, Ho Chi Minh City, Vietnam	Thailand	1–0	1–2	2015 AFF Women's Championship
6.	26 July 2016	Mandalarthiri Stadium, Mandalay, Myanmar	Singapore	2–0	14–0	2016 AFF Women's Championship
7.	26 July 2016	Mandalarthiri Stadium, Mandalay, Myanmar	Singapore	14–0	14–0	2016 AFF Women's Championship
8.	5 April 2017	Vietnam YFT Center, Hanoi, Vietnam	Syria	1–0	11–0	2018 AFC Women's Asian Cup qualification
9.	5 April 2017	Vietnam YFT Center, Hanoi, Vietnam	Syria	8–0	11–0	2018 AFC Women's Asian Cup qualification
10.	24 August 2017	UiTM Stadium, Shah Alam, Malaysia	Malaysia	2–0	6–0	2017 Southeast Asian Games
11.	24 August 2017	UiTM Stadium, Shah Alam, Malaysia	Malaysia	6–0	6–0	2017 Southeast Asian Games
12.	19 August 2018	Bumi Sriwijaya Stadium, Palembang, Indonesia	Thailand	3–1	3–2	2018 Asian Games
