= 2019 AFF Women's Championship =

Tournament details
- Host country: Thailand
- City: Chonburi
- Dates: 15–27 August
- Teams: 9 (from 1 sub-confederation)
- Venue: 1 (in 1 host city)

Final positions
- Champions: Vietnam (3rd title)
- Runners-up: Thailand
- Third place: Myanmar
- Fourth place: Philippines

Tournament statistics
- Matches played: 20
- Goals scored: 110 (5.5 per match)
- Attendance: 1,622 (81 per match)
- Top scorer(s): (Myanmar) Yee Yee Oo (8 goals)

The 2019 AFF Women's Championship was the 11th edition of the AFF Women's Championship, an international women's football tournament organised by the ASEAN Football Federation (AFF). The tournament was hosted by Thailand from 15 to 27 August 2019.

Vietnam ended Thailand's dominance in the last three editions of the tournament by winning 1–0 in the final. This is Vietnam's third title in total and first title after 7 years. For the first time since 2012, Australia (or its under-20 team) did not participate in the championship.

== Venues ==
Chonburi
IPE Chonburi Stadium 1
13°24′41″N 100°59′34″E
Capacity: 12,000
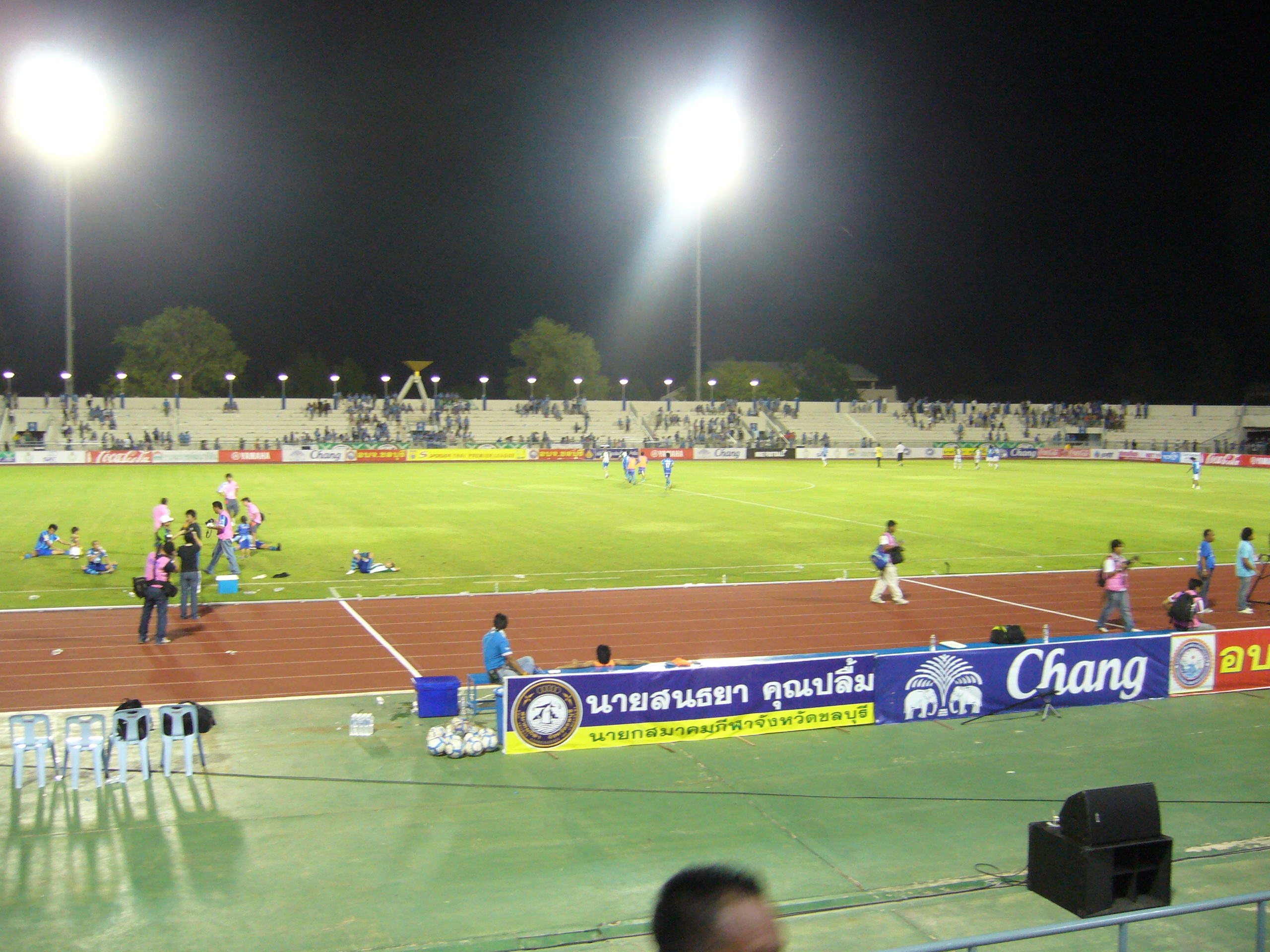

== Group stage ==
All times listed are Thai Standard Time (UTC+07:00)

=== Group A ===
Pos	Team	Pld	W	D	L	GF	GA	GD	Pts	Qualification
1	Thailand (H)	4	4	0	0	28	2	+26	12	Knockout stage
2	Philippines	4	3	0	1	16	4	+12	9	Knockout stage
3	Malaysia	4	2	0	2	9	10	−1	6	
4	Timor-Leste	4	1	0	3	2	22	−20	3	
5	Singapore	4	0	0	4	1	18	−17	0	

Source: AFF
Rules for classification: Group stage tiebreakers
(H) Hosts
15 August 2019
15:00

Philippines	3–0	Malaysia
Rodriguez 40', 60'; Long 51'	Report

IPE Chonburi Stadium 1, Chonburi
Attendance: 50
Referee: Thein Thein Aye (Myanmar)
15 August 2019
18:00

Timor-Leste	2–1	Singapore
Fernandes 59'; D. Costa 73'	Report	Danelle 90+6' (pen.)

IPE Chonburi Stadium 1, Chonburi
Attendance: 40
Referee: Rebecca Durcau (Australia)

17 August 2019
15:00

Timor-Leste	0–7	Philippines
	Report	Quezada 5'; Castañeda 13'; Rodriguez 23', 45+2'; Long 62' (pen.), 76'; Lemoran 90+2'

IPE Chonburi Stadium 1, Chonburi
Attendance: 52
Referee: Lee Yi-chi (Chinese Taipei)
17 August 2019
18:00

Singapore	0–8	Thailand
	Report	Wilaiporn 3', 68', 90+3'; Rattikan 30'; Orapin 45'; Saowalak 72'; Irravadee 75'; Nutwadee 83'

IPE Chonburi Stadium 1, Chonburi
Attendance: 100
Referee: Công Thị Dung (Vietnam)

19 August 2019
15:00

Malaysia	4–0	Singapore
Nurul I. 26'; Lovelytha 35'; Jaciah 56'; Shereilynn 80'	Report

IPE Chonburi Stadium 1, Chonburi
Attendance: 20
Referee: Thein Thein Aye (Myanmar)
19 August 2019
18:00

Thailand	9–0	Timor-Leste
Jaruwan 1'; Mendonça 11' (o.g.); Orapin 45', 90'; Kanjana 50', 60'; Suchawadee 63', 90+2'; Pitsamai 64'	Report

IPE Chonburi Stadium 1, Chonburi
Attendance: 70
Referee: Công Thị Dung (Vietnam)

21 August 2019
15:00

Malaysia	5–0	Timor-Leste
Sihaya 16', 86'; Dadree 60', 66'; Norhanisa 78'	Report

IPE Chonburi Stadium 1, Chonburi
Attendance: 20
Referee: Rebecca Durcau (Australia)
21 August 2019
18:00

Philippines	2–4	Thailand
Quezada 11', 66'	Report	Jaruwan 16'; Rattikan 74'; Silawan 75'; Wilaiporn 90'

IPE Chonburi Stadium 1, Chonburi
Attendance: 100
Referee: Oh Hyeon-jeong (South Korea)

23 August 2019
15:00

Singapore	0–4	Philippines
	Report	Del Campo 1', 45', 49'; Quezada 7'

IPE Chonburi Stadium 1, Chonburi
Attendance: 25
Referee: Rita Gani (Malaysia)
23 August 2019
18:00

Thailand	7–0	Malaysia
Saowalak 2', 14', 35', 86'; Orapin 26'; Khwanrudi 43', 47'	Report

IPE Chonburi Stadium 1, Chonburi
Attendance: 150
Referee: Abirami Naidu (Singapore)

=== Group B ===
Pos	Team	Pld	W	D	L	GF	GA	GD	Pts	Qualification
1	Vietnam	3	3	0	0	21	0	+21	9	Knockout stage
2	Myanmar	3	2	0	1	17	5	+12	6	Knockout stage
3	Indonesia	3	1	0	2	4	14	−10	3	
4	Cambodia	3	0	0	3	1	24	−23	0	

Source: AFF
Rules for classification: Group stage tiebreakers
16 August 2019
15:00

Myanmar	7–0	Indonesia
Yee Yee Oo 3', 27', 90'; Khaing Thazin 17'; Khin Moe Wai 45+4'; Win Theingi Tun 66'; Khin Marlar Tun 76'	Report

IPE Chonburi Stadium 1, Chonburi
Attendance: 45
Referee: Rita Gani (Malaysia)
16 August 2019
18:00

Vietnam	10–0	Cambodia
Huỳnh Như 3', 7'; Sreyneat 4' (o.g.); Phạm Hải Yến 15', 16', 84'; Nguyễn Thị Bích Thùy 17', 19', 24', 69'	Report

IPE Chonburi Stadium 1, Chonburi
Attendance: 150
Referee: Abirami Naidu (Singapore)

18 August 2019
15:00

Indonesia	0–7	Vietnam
	Report	Nguyễn Thị Bích Thùy 1'; Huỳnh Như 19', 40', 43'; Phạm Hải Yến 22'; Nguyễn Thị Tuyết Dung 61', 63'

IPE Chonburi Stadium 1, Chonburi
Attendance: 20
Referee: Rita Gani (Malaysia)
18 August 2019
18:00

Cambodia	1–10	Myanmar
Nimol 77' (pen.)	Report	May Thu Kyaw 30'; Khin Marlar Tun 31'; Yee Yee Oo 45+5', 73', 90', 90+4'; Win Theingi Tun 60', 90+3'; Khin Moe Wai 64'; Thin Thin Yu 79'

IPE Chonburi Stadium 1, Chonburi
Attendance: 90
Referee: Pansa Chaisanit (Thailand)

20 August 2019
15:00

Myanmar	0–4	Vietnam
	Report	Phạm Hải Yến 13', 61'; Thái Thị Thảo 43'; Nguyễn Thị Tuyết Dung 64' (pen.)

IPE Chonburi Stadium 1, Chonburi
Attendance: 70
Referee: Lee Yi-chi (Chinese Taipei)
20 August 2019
18:00

Cambodia	0–4	Indonesia
	Report	Mayang 21'; Dewi 25', 90+1'; Amiatun 90+4'

IPE Chonburi Stadium 1, Chonburi
Attendance: 20
Referee: Pansa Chaisanit (Thailand)

== Knockout stage ==
Semi-finals
25 August – Chonburi
Thailand	3
Myanmar	1
25 August – Chonburi
Vietnam	2
Philippines	1

Final
27 August – Chonburi
Thailand	0
Vietnam (a.e.t.)	1
Third Place
27 August – Chonburi
Myanmar	3
Philippines	0

=== Semi-finals ===
25 August 2019
15:00

Vietnam	2–1	Philippines
Huỳnh Như 41'; Nguyễn Thị Tuyết Dung 57'	Report	Trần Thị Hồng Nhung 35' (o.g.)

IPE Chonburi Stadium 1, Chonburi
Attendance: 40
Referee: Oh Hyeon-jeong (South Korea)
25 August 2019
18:00

Thailand	3–1	Myanmar
Pitsamai 20'; Rattikan 81'; Silawan 88'	Report	Khin Marlar Tun 90+3'

IPE Chonburi Stadium 1, Chonburi
Attendance: 200
Referee: Rebecca Durcau (Australia)

=== Third place match ===
27 August 2019
15:00

Myanmar	3–0	Philippines
Yee Yee Oo 63'; Nu Nu 66', 72'	Report

IPE Chonburi Stadium 1, Chonburi
Attendance: 60
Referee: Rita Gani (Malaysia)

=== Final ===
27 August 2019
18:00

Thailand	0–1 (a.e.t.)	Vietnam
	Report	Huỳnh Như 93'

IPE Chonburi Stadium 1, Chonburi
Attendance: 300
Referee: Abirami Naidu (Singapore)

== Awards ==
2019 AFF Women's Championship Champions
(Vietnam)
Vietnam
Third title

== Goalscorers ==
There were 110 goals scored in 20 matches, for an average of 5.5 goals per match.

8 goals

- (Myanmar) Yee Yee Oo

7 goals

- (Vietnam) Huỳnh Như

6 goals

- (Vietnam) Phạm Hải Yến

5 goals

- (Thailand) Saowalak Pengngam
- (Vietnam) Nguyễn Thị Bích Thùy

4 goals

- (Philippines) Camille Rodriguez
- (Philippines) Quinley Quezada
- (Thailand) Orapin Waenngoen
- (Thailand) Wilaiporn Boothduang
- (Vietnam) Nguyễn Thị Tuyết Dung

3 goals

- (Myanmar) Khin Marlar Tun
- (Myanmar) Win Theingi Tun
- (Philippines) Alisha Del Campo
- (Philippines) Hali Long
- (Thailand) Rattikan Thongsombut

2 goals

- (Indonesia) Dewi Tia Safitri
- (Malaysia) Dadree Rofinus
- (Malaysia) Sihaya Ajad
- (Myanmar) Khin Moe Wai
- (Myanmar) Nu Nu
- (Thailand) Jaruwan Chaiyarak
- (Thailand) Kanjana Sungngoen
- (Thailand) Khwanrudi Saengchan
- (Thailand) Suchawadee Nildhamrong
- (Thailand) Pitsamai Sornsai
- (Thailand) Silawan Intamee

1 goal

- (Cambodia) Somrit Nimol
- (Indonesia) Baiq Amiatun Shalihah
- (Indonesia) Mayang
- (Malaysia) Jaciah Jumilis
- (Malaysia) Lovelytha Jelus
- (Malaysia) Norhanisa Yahya
- (Malaysia) Nurul Izzati Zainol
- (Malaysia) Shereilynn Elly Pius
- (Myanmar) Khaing Thazin
- (Myanmar) May Thu Kyaw
- (Myanmar) Thin Thin Yu
- (Philippines) Charisa Lemoran
- (Philippines) Sara Castañeda
- (Singapore) Danelle Tan
- (Thailand) Irravadee Makris
- (Thailand) Nutwadee Pram-Nak
- (Timor-Leste) Dolores Costa
- (Timor-Leste) Luselia Fernandes
- (Vietnam) Thái Thị Thảo

1 own goal

- (Cambodia) Sen Sreyneat (playing against Vietnam)
- (Timor-Leste) Zonalia Mendonça (playing against Thailand)
- (Vietnam) Trần Thị Hồng Nhung (playing against Philippines)

== Final ranking ==
Pos	Team	Pld	W	D	L	GF	GA	GD	Pts	Final result
1	Vietnam	5	5	0	0	24	1	+23	15	Champions
2	Thailand (H)	6	5	0	1	31	4	+27	15	Runners-up
3	Myanmar	5	3	0	2	21	8	+13	9	Third place
4	Philippines	6	3	0	3	17	9	+8	9	Fourth place
5	Malaysia	4	2	0	2	9	10	−1	6	Eliminated in group stage
6	Indonesia	3	1	0	2	4	14	−10	3	Eliminated in group stage
7	Timor-Leste	4	1	0	3	2	22	−20	3	Eliminated in group stage
8	Singapore	4	0	0	4	1	18	−17	0	Eliminated in group stage
9	Cambodia	3	0	0	3	1	24	−23	0	Eliminated in group stage

(H) Hosts

== See also ==
- 2019 SAFF Women's Championship
- 2019 EAFF E-1 Football Championship (women)
