= Nguyễn Thị Tuyết Dung =

Vietnamese footballer (born 1993)

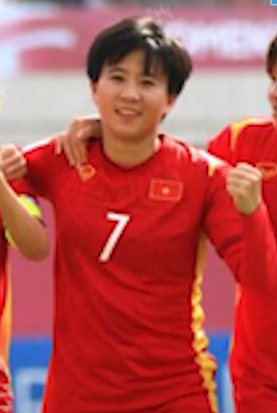
- Tuyết Dung in 2022

Personal information
- Date of birth: 13 December 1993 (age 32)
- Place of birth: Bình Lục, Hà Nam, Vietnam
- Height: 1.55 m (5 ft 1 in)
- Position: Winger

Team information
- Current team: Phong Phú Hà Nam
- Number: 7

Senior career*
Years	Team	Apps	(Gls)
2010–2025	Phong Phú Hà Nam	163	(74)

International career
2011–2025	Vietnam	131	(53)
- * Club domestic league appearances and goals

Nguyễn Thị Tuyết Dung (born 13 December 1993) is a Vietnamese former footballer who plays as a winger for Phong Phú Hà Nam and Vietnam women's national team. She ranks as the all-time top appearance for Vietnam national team and their third highest scorer.

== Playing career ==
Tuyet Dung started her career in the youth team of Phong Phu Ha Nam in 2006. She won the Vietnamese Golden Ball award for women's soccer player in 2014. In a 2015 match against Malaysia, Dung scored two goals directly from corners. The first goal was scored with her left foot and the second with her right foot, won the match 7-0. In 2017, Dung was named on the BBC 100 Women list. Dung was the first Vietnamese athlete on the BBC 100 Women list.

On 22 October 2025, Tuyết Dung had announced her retirement of her football playing career to move on to her coaching career. She got 131 caps, scored 53 goals for Vietnam national team.

== Career statistics ==
=== International ===
Appearances and goals by national team and year
National Team	Year	Apps	Goals
Vietnam	2011	3	4
Vietnam	2012	5	2
Vietnam	2013	10	4
Vietnam	2014	10	3
Vietnam	2015	10	3
Vietnam	2016	12	5
Vietnam	2017	8	5
Vietnam	2018	13	5
Vietnam	2019	16	11
Vietnam	2020	4	0
Vietnam	2021	2	2
Vietnam	2022	18	7
Vietnam	2023	16	0
Vietnam	2024	2	1
Vietnam	2025	2	1
Total		131	53

Scores and results are list Vietnam's goal tally first.

No.	Cap.	Date	Venue	Opponent	Score	Result	Competition
1.	1.	20 October 2011	Chao Anouvong Stadium, Vientiane, Laos	Indonesia	2–0	14–0	2011 AFF Women's Championship
2.	1.	20 October 2011	Chao Anouvong Stadium, Vientiane, Laos	Indonesia	3–0	14–0	2011 AFF Women's Championship
3.	1.	20 October 2011	Chao Anouvong Stadium, Vientiane, Laos	Indonesia	4–0	14–0	2011 AFF Women's Championship
4.	1.	20 October 2011	Chao Anouvong Stadium, Vientiane, Laos	Indonesia	5–0	14–0	2011 AFF Women's Championship
5.	4.	13 September 2012	Thống Nhất Stadium, Ho Chi Minh City, Vietnam	Singapore	8–0	10–0	2012 AFF Women's Championship
6.	5.	15 September 2012	Thống Nhất Stadium, Ho Chi Minh City, Vietnam	Philippines	4–1	4–2	2012 AFF Women's Championship
7.	9.	16 May 2013	Amman, Jordan	Jordan	1–0	5–1	Friendly
8.	9.	16 May 2013	Amman, Jordan	Jordan	3–0	5–1	Friendly
9.	15.	13 December 2013	Mandalarthiri Stadium, Mandalay, Myanmar	Philippines	6–0	7–0	2013 Southeast Asian Games
10.	17.	18 December 2013	Mandalarthiri Stadium, Mandalay, Myanmar	Malaysia	2–0	4–0	2013 Southeast Asian Games
11.	21.	21 May 2014	Thống Nhất Stadium, Ho Chi Minh City, Vietnam	Thailand	1–2	1–2	2014 AFC Women's Asian Cup
12.	25.	23 September 2014	Incheon Namdong Asiad Rugby Field, Incheon, South Korea	Hong Kong	2–0	5–0	2014 Asian Games
13.	26.	26 September 2014	Goyang Stadium, Goyang, South Korea	Thailand	2–1	2–1	2014 Asian Games
14.	30.	4 May 2015	Thống Nhất Stadium, Ho Chi Minh City, Vietnam	Malaysia	5–0	7–0	2015 AFF Women's Championship
15.	30.	4 May 2015	Thống Nhất Stadium, Ho Chi Minh City, Vietnam	Malaysia	6–0	7–0	2015 AFF Women's Championship
16.	30.	4 May 2015	Thống Nhất Stadium, Ho Chi Minh City, Vietnam	Malaysia	7–0	7–0	2015 AFF Women's Championship
17.	47.	26 July 2016	Mandalarthiri Stadium, Mandalay, Myanmar	Singapore	4–0	10–0	2016 AFF Women's Championship
18.	47.	26 July 2016	Mandalarthiri Stadium, Mandalay, Myanmar	Singapore	9–0	10–0	2016 AFF Women's Championship
19.	48.	28 July 2016	Mandalarthiri Stadium, Mandalay, Myanmar	Philippines	2–0	4–0	2016 AFF Women's Championship
20.	48.	28 July 2016	Mandalarthiri Stadium, Mandalay, Myanmar	Philippines	3–0	4–0	2016 AFF Women's Championship
21.	49.	2 August 2016	Mandalarthiri Stadium, Mandalay, Myanmar	Myanmar	2–0	3–3	2016 AFF Women's Championship
22.	51.	5 April 2017	Vietnam YFT Center, Hanoi, Vietnam	Syria	3–0	11–0	2018 AFC Women's Asian Cup qualification
23.	51.	5 April 2017	Vietnam YFT Center, Hanoi, Vietnam	Syria	7–0	11–0	2018 AFC Women's Asian Cup qualification
24.	53.	9 April 2017	Vietnam YFT Center, Hanoi, Vietnam	Iran	1–1	6–1	2018 AFC Women's Asian Cup qualification
25.	54.	11 April 2017	Vietnam YFT Center, Hanoi, Vietnam	Myanmar	1–0	2–0	2018 AFC Women's Asian Cup qualification
26.	55.	17 August 2017	UM Arena Stadium, Kuala Lumpur, Malaysia	Philippines	2–0	3–0	2017 Southeast Asian Games
27.	65.	3 July 2018	Jakabaring Stadium, Palembang, Indonesia	Philippines	6–0	6–0	2018 AFF Women's Championship
28.	66.	5 July 2018	Jakabaring Stadium, Palembang, Indonesia	Singapore	3–0	10–0	2018 AFF Women's Championship
29.	66.	5 July 2018	Jakabaring Stadium, Palembang, Indonesia	Singapore	4–0	10–0	2018 AFF Women's Championship
30.	69.	13 July 2018	Jakabaring Stadium, Palembang, Indonesia	Myanmar	1–0	3–0	2018 AFF Women's Championship
		19 July 2018	Vietnam YTF Center, Hanoi, Vietnam	Chinese Taipei	1–2	4–3	Friendly
		25 July 2018	Vietnam YTF Center, Hanoi, Vietnam	Chinese Taipei	1–0	4–0	Friendly
		25 July 2018	Vietnam YTF Center, Hanoi, Vietnam	Chinese Taipei	2–0	4–0	Friendly
31.	70.	19 August 2018	Bumi Sriwijaya Stadium, Palembang, Indonesia	Thailand	1–0	3–2	2018 Asian Games
32.	73.	23 March 2019	Mandalarthiri Stadium, Mandalay, Myanmar	Myanmar	1–0	2–3	Friendly
33.	73.	23 March 2019	Mandalarthiri Stadium, Mandalay, Myanmar	Myanmar	2–0	2–3	Friendly
34.	74.	3 April 2019	Lokomotiv Stadium, Tashkent, Uzbekistan	Uzbekistan	2–1	2–1	2020 AFC Women's Olympic Qualifying Tournament
35.	78.	18 August 2019	IPE Chonburi Stadium 1, Chonburi, Thailand	Indonesia	6–0	7–0	2019 AFF Women's Championship
36.	78.	18 August 2019	IPE Chonburi Stadium 1, Chonburi, Thailand	Indonesia	7–0	7–0	2019 AFF Women's Championship
37.	79.	20 August 2019	IPE Chonburi Stadium 1, Chonburi, Thailand	Myanmar	4–0	4–0	2019 AFF Women's Championship
38.	80.	25 August 2019	IPE Chonburi Stadium 1, Chonburi, Thailand	Philippines	2–1	2–1	2019 AFF Women's Championship
39.	82.	3 November 2019	Vietnam YTF Center, Hanoi, Vietnam	India	2–0	3–0	Friendly
40.	85.	29 November 2019	Biñan Football Stadium, Biñan, Philippines	Indonesia	1–0	6–0	2019 Southeast Asian Games
41.	85.	29 November 2019	Biñan Football Stadium, Biñan, Philippines	Indonesia	6–0	6–0	2019 Southeast Asian Games
42.	86.	5 December 2019	Biñan Football Stadium, Biñan, Philippines	Philippines	2–0	2–0	2019 Southeast Asian Games
43.	92.	23 November 2021	Pamir Stadium, Dushanbe, Tajikistan	Maldives	3–0	16–0	2022 AFC Women's Asian Cup qualification
44.	92.	23 November 2021	Pamir Stadium, Dushanbe, Tajikistan	Maldives	11–0	16–0	2022 AFC Women's Asian Cup qualification
45.	96.	27 January 2022	DY Patil Stadium, Navi Mumbai, India	Myanmar	1–1	2–2	2022 AFC Women's Asian Cup
46.	97.	30 January 2022	DY Patil Stadium, Navi Mumbai, India	China	1–0	1–3	2022 AFC Women's Asian Cup
47.	101.	11 May 2022	Cẩm Phả Stadium, Cẩm Phả, Vietnam	Philippines	1–1	2–1	2021 Southeast Asian Games
48.	102.	14 May 2022	Cẩm Phả Stadium, Cẩm Phả, Vietnam	Cambodia	3–0	7–0	2021 Southeast Asian Games
49.	108.	11 July 2022	Biñan Football Stadium, Biñan, Philippines	Timor-Leste	3–0	6–0	2022 AFF Women's Championship
50.	109.	13 July 2022	Rizal Memorial Stadium, Manila, Philippines	Myanmar	1–0	4–0	2022 AFF Women's Championship
51.	109.	13 July 2022	Rizal Memorial Stadium, Manila, Philippines	Myanmar	2–0	4–0	2022 AFF Women's Championship
52.	128.	23 October 2024	Yongchuan Sports Center, Chongqing, China	Uzbekistan	1–0	2–0	2024 Yongchuan International Tournament
53.	131.	9 August 2025	Lạch Tray Stadium, Haiphong, Vietnam	Indonesia	7–0	7–0	2025 ASEAN Women's Championship

== Honours ==
=== Vietnam ===
- SEA Games : 2017, 2019, 2023

=== Individual ===
- Vietnamese Women's Golden Ball: 2014, 2018
- Vietnamese Women's Silver Ball: 2015, 2017
- Vietnamese Women's Bronze Ball: 2019
- Labor Order 2nd Class: 2022
