= Pedrolia Martin Sikayun =

Malaysian footballer

Personal information
- Date of birth: 18 February 1992 (age 34)
- Place of birth: Malaysia
- Position: Midfielder

Senior career*
Years	Team	Apps	(Gls)
- MISC-MIFA

International career
- Malaysia
- * Club domestic league appearances and goals

Pedrolia Martin Sikayun (born 18 February 1992) is a Malaysian women's international footballer who plays as a midfielder. She is a member of the Malaysia women's national football team. She was part of the team at the 2016 AFF Women's Championship. At a club level she played for MISC-MIFA in Malaysia.
