= Soleen Al-Zoubi =

Jordanian football manager

Soleen Al-Zoubi (Arabic: سولين الزعبي) is a Jordanian football manager who is the current head coach of Malaysia women's national football team.

== Early life ==
Al-Zoubi started having a "passing for football" at the age of four.

== Career ==
Al-Zoubi has been regarded as an important figure in the development of women's football in Jordan. In 2018, she was awarded the AFC Certificate with Distinction in Football Management. In 2023, she was appointed manager of the Malaysia women's national football team. She managed the team at the 2023 SEA Games. Previously, she worked as the director of women's football for the Jordan Football Association. She also worked as a match analyst for the Asian Women's' Cup.

== Personal life ==
Al-Zoubi has three brothers.
