= Pajaree Thaoto =

Thai footballer

Personal information
- Date of birth: 12 October 1992 (age 34)
- Place of birth: Khon Kaen, Thailand
- Position: Forward

Senior career*
Years	Team	Apps	(Gls)
- BG-Bandit Asia

International career^{‡}
2014	Thailand	2	(0)
- * Club domestic league appearances and goals ‡ National team caps and goals as of 21 May 2014

Pajaree Thaoto (born 12 October 1992) is a Thai footballer who plays as a forward. She has been a member of the Thailand women's national team.

== International goals ==
No.	Date	Venue	Opponent	Score	Result	Competition
1.	21 October 2011	Chao Anouvong Stadium, Vientiane, Laos	Myanmar	3–1	3–1	2011 AFF Women's Championship
