= Khaing Thazin =

Burmese footballer

Personal information
- Date of birth: 18 July 1996 (age 30)
- Place of birth: Yangon, Myanmar
- Height: 1.55 m (5 ft 1 in)
- Position: Defender

Team information
- Current team: Myawady W.F.C
- Number: 26

Senior career*
Years	Team	Apps	(Gls)
2020-	Myawady W.F.C		

International career^{‡}
2018–	Myanmar	55	(0)
- * Club domestic league appearances and goals as of 19 September 2023 ‡ National team caps and goals as of 30 Sep 2023

Khaing Thazin (Burmese: ခိုင်သဇင်း; born 18 July 1996) is a Burmese footballer who plays as a defender for the Myanmar women's national team.

== International goals ==
Scores and results list Myanmar's goal tally first.

No.	Date	Venue	Opponent	Score	Result	Competition
1.	16 August 2019	IPE Chonburi Stadium, Chonburi, Thailand	Indonesia	2–0	7–0	2019 AFF Women's Championship

== See also ==
- List of Myanmar women's international footballers
