= Jaciah Jumilis =

Malaysian footballer

Personal information
- Date of birth: 23 July 1991 (age 35)
- Place of birth: Keningau, Sabah, Malaysia
- Height: 1.55 m (5 ft 1 in)
- Position: Midfielder

Senior career*
Years	Team	Apps	(Gls)
2015–2018	Sabah		
2019	Melaka United	7	(3)
2022	Melaka United	5	(2)
2023	LMS Tigress	6	(1)
2023	KL Spicegals		
2024–	Sabah	14	(4)

International career^{‡}
2009–	Malaysia	64	(5)
- * Club domestic league appearances and goals ‡ National team caps and goals as of 22 June 2025

Jaciah Jumilis (born 23 July 1991) is a Malaysian women's footballer who plays as a midfielder for Malaysia National Women's League club Sabah FA and the Malaysia national team.

== Career ==
Jaciah played for several club in Malaysia. She played for Sabah from 2015 until 2018 in the Piala Tun Sharifah Rodziah. In 2019 and 2022 she played for Melaka United and won the Piala Tun Sharifah Rodziah. In 2023 she played for LMS Tigress in Malaysia National Women's League. She also played in the FAS Women's Super League and KLFA Women's Super League with KL Spicegals. In 2024 she return to Sabah and played in the 2024–25 AFC Women's Champions League.

== International career ==
Jaciah has represented Malaysia since 2009 and played over 60 international 'A' match. She was part of Malaysia's women team at the AFF Women's Championship since 2011 edition. She also participated in 5 edition of SEA Games (2009, 2013, 2017, 2019, 2023). In 2021, she played 2 matches of 2022 AFC Women's Asian Cup qualification against Thailand and Palestine.

== International goals ==
No.	Date	Venue	Opponent	Score	Result	Competition
1.	2 September 2012	Bukit Gombak Stadium, Singapore	Singapore	3–1	5–1	Friendly
2.	19 October 2013	Padang SUK, Shah Alam, Malaysia	Singapore	1–0	2–0	Friendly
3.	8 July 2018	Bumi Sriwijaya Stadium, Palembang, Indonesia	Timor-Leste	1–0	4–0	2018 AFF Women's Championship
4.	19 August 2019	IPE Chonburi Stadium, Chonburi, Thailand	Singapore	3–0	4–0	2019 AFF Women's Championship
5.	21 November 2019	Jalan Besar Stadium, Singapore	Singapore	1–0	2–2	Friendly
