= Dadree Rofinus =

Malaysian footballer (born 1990)

Personal information
- Full name: Dadree Rofinus
- Date of birth: 7 January 1990 (age 36)
- Place of birth: Penampang, Sabah, Malaysia
- Height: 1.57 m (5 ft 2 in)
- Position: Midfielder

Senior career*
| Years | Team | Apps | (Gls) |
- Sabah
| 2016 | MISC-MIFA | 7 | (3) |
| 2017 | Sabah | | |
| 2018–2019 | Melaka United | 17 | (21) |
| 2022–2023 | Sabah | 14 | (2) |

International career
| 2009–2021 | Malaysia | 44 | (10) |
- Malaysia futsal
- * Club domestic league appearances and goals

Dadree Rofinus (born 7 January 1990) is a Malaysian women's footballer who plays as a midfielder and women's futsal player. She currently hold the record as the all-time top scorer for the Malaysia women's national team.

== Career ==
=== Football ===
Dadree spent most of her football career with Sabah. In 2016, she played for MISC-MIFA and won the Piala Tun Sharifah Rodziah. She was chosen as the recipient of the Best Female Player award at the 2016 National Football Awards ceremony. In 2018 and 2019, she played a pivotal role for Melaka United, scoring 12 goals in 2018 as the team finished as runners-up, and 9 goals in 2019 when Melaka were crowned champions.

== International career ==
Dadree has represented Malaysia since 2009 and played over 40 international 'A' match and scored 10 international 'A' goals. She was part of Malaysia's women team at the 2012, 2013, 2015, 2016, and 2019 AFF Women's Championship. She also participated in 4 edition of SEA Games (2009, 2013, 2017, 2019). In 2021, she played 2 matches of 2022 AFC Women's Asian Cup qualification against Thailand and Palestine.

== International goals ==
| No. | Date | Venue | Opponent | Score | Result | Competition |
|---|---|---|---|---|---|---|
| 1. | 23 October 2013 | UiTM Stadium, Shah Alam | Laos | 1–1 | 1–2 | Friendly |
| 2. | 25 October 2013 | UiTM Stadium, Shah Alam | Laos | 1–0 | 1–0 | Friendly |
| 3. | 29 July 2016 | Mandalarthiri Stadium, Mandalay | Myanmar | 1–0 | 1–2 | 2016 AFF Women's Championship |
| 4. | 18 February 2017 | Jalan Besar Stadium, Singapore | Singapore | 1–0 | 4–0 | 2017 Women's Development Tournament |
| 5. | 22 May 2017 | Likas Stadium, Kota Kinabalu | Nepal | 1–0 | 1–1 | Friendly |
| 6. | 15 August 2017 | UiTM Stadium, Shah Alam | Philippines | 1–1 | 1–2 | 2017 SEA Games |
| 7. | 21 August 2019 | IPE Chonburi Stadium 1, Chonburi | Timor-Leste | 2–0 | 5–0 | 2019 AFF Women's Championship |
| 8. | 21 August 2019 | IPE Chonburi Stadium 1, Chonburi | Timor-Leste | 3–0 | 5–0 | 2019 AFF Women's Championship |
| 9. | 22 November 2019 | Serangoon Stadium, Singapore | Singapore | 1–0 | 4–1 | Friendly |
| 10. | 22 November 2019 | Serangoon Stadium, Singapore | Singapore | 2–0 | 4–1 | Friendly |
