= Trần Thị Hồng Nhung =

Vietnamese footballer

Personal information
- Date of birth: 28 October 1992 (age 34)
- Place of birth: Duy Tiên, Hà Nam, Vietnam
- Height: 1.58 m (5 ft 2 in)
- Position: Defender

Team information
- Current team: Phong Phú Hà Nam
- Number: 12

Senior career*
Years	Team	Apps	(Gls)
2009–	Phong Phú Hà Nam	86	(7)

International career^{‡}
2014–	Vietnam	21	(0)
- * Club domestic league appearances and goals ‡ National team caps and goals as of 09:30, 23 May 2015 (UTC)

Trần Thị Hồng Nhung (born 28 October 1992) is a Vietnamese footballer who plays as a midfielder.

In May 2019, she played a semi-final match for Chonburi F.C. winning against Air Force United F.C. in the 2019 Thai Women's League. She was expected to play the final match against BG Bundit Asia. However, the final match was not organized to help the Thailand women's national football team to prepare for the 2019 FIFA Women's World Cup.

== International goals ==
No.	Date	Venue	Opponent	Score	Result	Competition
1.	4 May 2015	Thống Nhất Stadium, Ho Chi Minh City, Vietnam	Malaysia	2–0	7–0	2015 AFF Women's Championship
