= Jaruwan Chaiyarak =

Thai footballer (born 1990)

Personal information
- Date of birth: 23 April 1990 (age 36)
- Place of birth: Chaiyaphum, Thailand
- Height: 1.60 m (5 ft 3 in)
- Position: Forward

Senior career*
Years	Team	Apps	(Gls)
2025	Still Aerion WFC		(5)

International career^{‡}
2019	Thailand	10	(2)
- * Club domestic league appearances and goals ‡ National team caps and goals as of 8 December 2019

Jaruwan Chaiyarak (Thai: จารุวรรณ ไชยรักษ์; born 23 April 1990) is a Thai footballer who plays as a forward for the Thailand women's national team.

== International goals ==
Scores and results list Thailand's goal tally first.

No.	Date	Venue	Opponent	Score	Result	Competition
1.	19 August 2019	IPE Chonburi Stadium, Chonburi, Thailand	Timor-Leste	1–0	9–0	2019 AFF Women's Championship
2.	21 August 2019	IPE Chonburi Stadium, Chonburi, Thailand	Philippines	1–1	4–2	2019 AFF Women's Championship
