= Malaysia women's national football team =

Malaysia
- Nickname(s): Harimau Malaya Wanita (Malayan Tigress)
- Association: Football Association of Malaysia (FAM)
- Confederation: AFC (Asia)
- Sub-confederation: AFF (Southeast Asia)
- Head coach: Joel Cornelli
- Captain: Steffi Sarge Kaur
- Most caps: Jaciah Jumilis (72)
- Top scorer: Dadree Rofinus (10)
- Home stadium: UiTM Stadium
- FIFA code: MAS
| First colours | Second colours |

FIFA ranking
- Current: 101 ▼6 (20 October 2026)
- Highest: 69 (July 2003)
- Lowest: 102 (December 2024 – June 2025)

First international
- New Zealand 3–0 Malaysia (Hong Kong; 27 August 1975)

Biggest win
- Timor-Leste 0–13 Malaysia (Mandalay, Myanmar; 31 July 2016)

Biggest defeat
- Chinese Taipei 16–0 Malaysia (Iloilo, Philippines; 7 November 1999); Malaysia 0–16 Myanmar (Kuala Lumpur, Malaysia; 25 May 2005)

Asian Cup
- Appearances: 9 (first in 1975)
- Best result: Third place (1983)

AFF Championship
- Appearances: 10 (first in 2007)
- Best result: Fourth place (2007)
Medal record
SEA Games
| Silver medal – second place | 1995 Thailand | Team |

The Malaysia women's national football team represents Malaysia in international women's association football; it is controlled by the Football Association of Malaysia (FAM). Unlike the men's team, Malaysia women's football team is represented by amateur players and semi professional players.

== History ==
=== 1970s until 1990s ===
In March 1975, Women's Football Association of Malaysia was established with Tun Sharifah Rodziah as its first President and Datin Teoh Chye Hin taking on the role of Secretary General. Among the earlier member states in this new association were Perak, Penang, Negeri Sembilan and Melaka.

Soon after its formation, the Malaysia women's national football team participated in their first competition, the first Asian Women's Football Championship which now known as AFC Women's Asian Cup organised by the Asian Football Confederation (AFC) in Hong Kong. The Malaysian team managed to earn a respectable fourth placing after losing to Australia in the third place play-off.

Encouraged by the team's success in Hong Kong, Datin Teoh Chye Hin set in motion plans in 1976 to organise a special football competition for secondary schoolgirls in Perak. By the late 1970s, football associations in other states also started organising similar competitions to inject fresh blood into their respective state teams.

These efforts started bearing fruit in the early 1980s when the Malaysian women's football team coached by Shamdin Yusoff finished third in the 1983 AFC Women's Asian Cup tournament held in Bangkok, Thailand. One of Malaysia's key player in the 1983 tournament is Normala Rashid who is dubbed as the 'Lady Mokhtar Dahari' by the Malaysian media in the 1980s.

Despite the success in 1983, not much has been heard about Malaysia women's football team until 1995 Southeast Asian Games. Assembles only 15 days before the tournament, Malaysia coached by Paramsivam Manickam manage to grab the silver medal, losing 1–0 to host Thailand in the final.

=== 2000s ===
Entering 2000s, women's football in Malaysia is considerably underdeveloped with no women's football league. Despite that, Malaysia still manage to enter the semi final and finish fourth at the 2003 Southeast Asian Games under the guidance of Zhang Hong, a women's football coach from China which also the first female to coach Malaysia women's football team.

In 2005, the team was one of eight that included the Philippines, Thailand, Indonesia, Laos, Vietnam, Myanmar and Singapore, that were expected to field a women's football team to compete at the SEA Games in the Philippines. However, Olympic Council of Malaysia decided not to send the team to the competition after they suffered their heaviest defeat in history, a 16–0 loss at home to Myanmar in a friendly.

In 2006, Football Association of Malaysia (FAM) appointed former player Normala Rashid as FAM's head of women's football. Among the achievements during her role is the first ever gold medal for the national women's team at the Arafura sports festival in Australia, a semi-final qualification at the 2007 AFF Women's Championship in Myanmar, and the first national women's futsal interstate championship.

However, Malaysia still performing badly in regional and continental competition, especially in the 2009 Southeast Asian Games, which saw Malaysia lose all matches by large margins, leading FAM to suspend the women's national team from international competition.

=== 2010s ===
Malaysia return to international stages in 2011 AFF Women's Championship but still lost heavily to Thailand and Myanmar. In 2012 AFF Women's Championship, Malaysia have the chance to enter the semi final but eventually lost 3–2 to Laos. At the 2013 Southeast Asian Games, Malaysia coached by Jacob Joseph qualified to the semi final for the first time after 10 years and finish in fourth place.

In December 2015, FAM hired Asyraaf Fong Abdullah to coach the women's national team. However, Malaysia still failed to advance past the group stage of AFF Women's Championship in 2015 and 2016. In 2017 the team start the year on positive notes by defeating Bangladesh 2–1 and Singapore 4–0 to win the Women's Development Tournament hosted by Singapore. At the 2017 Southeast Asian Games, Malaysia lost all their matches despite playing at home.

Jacob Joseph return as the head coach of Malaysia women's team in 2018 and led the team at the 2018 and 2019 AFF Women's Championship and 2019 Southeast Asian Games which Malaysia failed to advance past the group stage.

=== 2020s ===
After the pandemic in 2020, Malaysia played their first match after 2 years against Thailand and Palestine for the qualification to 2022 AFC Women's Asian Cup. Malaysia lost 4–0 to Thailand and won 2–0 against Palestine. After the qualification match ended, the national players urged FAM to setup the first women football league in Malaysia. Consequently, FAM finally establish Malaysia National Women's League in 2023.

On 17 November 2022, FAM appointed Soleen Al-Zoubi from Jordan, the second female head coach in Malaysia women's team history. Under Al-Zoubi, Malaysia finisehd third in the 2023 Women's International Friendly Tournament defeating host Saudi Arabia 1–0.

On 14 May 2025, FAM appointed Joel Cornelli as the first Brazilian head coach of the national women's football team replacing Soleen Al-Zoubi, who had been reassigned as FAM women's football technical director. Cornelli lost the first match 2–1 against Hong Kong at the 2025 Women's Tri-Nation Cup. Eventually, he become the first coach to won 5 straight games for Malaysia women's team starting in the match against Bhutan, 2 times friendly against United Arab Emirates, and Palestine and Tajikistan at the 2026 AFC Women's Asian Cup qualification. The winning streak was ended by North Korea in the final match of the qualifiers.

== Team image ==
=== Nicknames ===
The Malaysia women's national football team has been known or nicknamed as the "Harimau Malaya (Malayan Tigress)" or Skuad Kebangsaan (National Team)".

=== Kits and crest ===
The logo symbolises the unity and forward progress of Malaysian football. Composed of four main elements, the logo stands for the development and awareness of the international image and patriotism of the sport in Malaysia. The Malayan tiger leaping over a football is the main element of the logo, and symbolises the courage and dignity portrayed while playing the game. The paddy stalks represent the prosperity and wealth of Malaysia, and the development of football in the country from the grassroots level. The Malay kris that rests at the top represents nationalism, and awareness that represents Malaysia at every level of football. The entire emblem is enclosed within a circle that represents the unity and timelessness of the sport.

==== Kit suppliers ====
Similar to the men's team, the national team kit was manufactured by Adidas from the 1970s, who also sponsored the national team kit. Since 2007, the official Malaysia team kit has been manufactured by Nike. The home kit's design of black and yellow stripes is a throwback to the kit used by the Malaysian national team of the 1920s. The great national team of the 1970s also sported similar stripes, which are supposed to be reminiscent of the stripes of a tiger, the symbol of Malaysia's national football team. Since November 2010, Nike Malaysia has replaced Adidas as the team kit sponsor.

Adidas (1970–2006)
| 1995–1997 Home | 1995–1997 Away | 2000 Home | 2001 Home |
| 2002 Home | 2001–2002 Away | 2004–2005 Home | 2004–2005 Away |

Nike (2007–2024)
| 2007–2008 Home | 2007–2008 Away | 2008–2010 Home | 2008–2010 Away | 2010–2012 Home | 2010–2012 Away |
| 2012–2014 Home | 2012–2014 Away | 2014–2016 Home | 2014–2016 Away | Current Home | Current Away |

=== Home stadium ===
Unlike the men's team, Malaysia women's team play in various venue at home. They played at the UiTM Stadium, Selayang Stadium and Likas Stadium.

=== Supporters ===
Ultras Malaya is the name of the major supporter of the national team. They are known for their high fanaticism and support towards the national team. In every international match the national team played, a group standing in the supporter's area can be found. The main colours of the supporters are usually black with a yellow scarf and banners just like the national team kit colours. These supporters always bring flares, drums and large national flags to the stadiums.

=== Sponsors ===
According to the website of Football Association of Malaysia, Malaysia main sponsors include Bank Islam, Malaysia Airlines, Nike, Telekom Malaysia, 100plus, Extra Joss, KN, Wonda Coffee, Origina, Sanctband Active, Milo and Kronos with the association also establish social responsibilities partners with One Goal and Malaysian Conservation Alliance for Tigers (MYCAT).

== Results and fixtures ==
The following is a list of match results in the last 12 months, as well as any future matches that have been scheduled.

Legend

Win Draw Loss Fixture

=== 2026 ===
| 3 June Friendly | Jordan | 4–3 | Malaysia | Amman, Jordan |
| 18:00 UTC+3 | M. Abu Tayeh 7'; Siti Nurfaizah 46' (o.g.); Jbarah 79'; Al Fararjeh 90+5' | Report; Report | Ainsyah 18'; Najwa 25', 37' | Stadium: King Abdullah Stadium |

| 6 June Friendly | Malaysia | 0–2 | Palestine | Amman, Jordan |
| 18:00 UTC+2 | | Report | Saavedra 60'; Asad-Halim 62' | Stadium: Petra Stadium; Referee: Esraa Al-Mbaiden (Jordan) |

| 10 July 2026 AFF Women's Cup | Laos | 1–1 | Malaysia | Kuala Lumpur, Malaysia |
| 20:45 UTC+8 | Kemmy 37' | Report | Nurhadfina 50' | Stadium: Kuala Lumpur Stadium; Referee: Asaka Koizumi (Japan) |

| 16 July 2026 AFF Women's Cup | Malaysia | 1–3 | Singapore | Kuala Lumpur, Malaysia |
| 16:45 UTC+8 | Henrietta 58' | Report | Suresh 12'; Tan 44', 72' (pen.) | Stadium: Kuala Lumpur Stadium; Referee: Pansa Chaisanit (Thailand) |

| 9 October Friendly | Saudi Arabia | 2–0 | Malaysia | Doha, Qatar |
| 19:00 UTC+3 | Tawfiq 87'; Al-Saiari 90' | Report | | Stadium: Aspire Academy Stadium |

| 13 October Friendly | Saudi Arabia | 0–1 | Malaysia | Doha, Qatar |
| 19:00 UTC+3 | | Report | Mahrt 5' | Stadium: Aspire Academy Stadium |

== Team officials ==
| Roles | Names | Appointment date |
Team Management
| Deputy CEO | (Malaysia) Stanley Bernard | 15 April 2025 |
Coaching Staff
| Head coach | (Brazil) Joel Cornelli | 14 May 2025 |
| Assistant coach | (Malaysia) Leila Chua Pak Ling | |
| Goalkeeping coach | (Malaysia) Kris Yong Wai Hwang | |
| Fitness coach | (Malaysia) Azizan Ghazali | 21 May 2025 |
| Doctor | (Malaysia) Zaidi Salleh | |
| Physiotherapist | (Malaysia) Shohaili Mansor | |
| Performance analyst | (Malaysia) Ahmad Sallehin Khalid | |
| Technical director | (Jordan) Soleen Al-Zoubi | 16 December 2022 |

== Players ==
=== Current squad ===
The following players were called up for the friendly matches against Saudi Arabia in Doha, Qatar in October 2026.

| No. | Pos. | Player | Date of birth (age) | Caps | Goals | Club |
|---|---|---|---|---|---|---|
| | GK | Asma Junaidi | 18 November 1992 (age 33) | | | (Football Association of Malaysia) Sabah |
| | GK | Daiyana Wardina Mohd Rosdi | 23 January 2005 (age 21) | | | (Football Association of Malaysia) Selangor |
| | GK | Nurdiana Syafiqah Mohd Rostam | 11 March 2008 (age 18) | | | (Football Association of Malaysia) Selangor |
| | DF | Nur Amirah Abdul Rahman | 21 November 2004 (age 21) | 10 | 0 | (Football Association of Malaysia) Selangor |
| | DF | Eusvewana Kadius | 25 May 2005 (age 21) | 14 | 0 | (Football Association of Malaysia) Selangor |
| | DF | Nurhadfina Mohd Firdaus | 2 September 2004 (age 22) | 11 | 0 | (Football Association of Malaysia) Selangor |
| | DF | Juliana Barek | 4 January 2002 (age 24) | 15 | 1 | (Football Association of Malaysia) Sabah |
| | DF | Siti Nurfaizah Saidin | 1 April 2002 (age 24) | 24 | 0 | (Football Association of Malaysia) Sabah |
| | DF | Azzlyeanieh Kinuli | 3 February 2005 (age 21) | | | (Football Association of Malaysia) Sabah |
| | MF | S. Thivashini | 5 January 2006 (age 20) | | | (Football Association of Malaysia) Selangor |
| | MF | Nur Najwa Irdina Zaidi | 26 September 2006 (age 20) | 9 | 1 | (Football Association of Malaysia) Selangor |
| | MF | Jaciah Jumilis | 23 July 1991 (age 35) | 72 | 5 | (Football Association of Malaysia) Sabah |
| | MF | Nur Lyana Soberi | 18 June 1999 (age 27) | 30 | 0 | (Football Association of Malaysia) Kelana United |
| | MF | Siti Nurkhaleeda Ismail | 18 May 2001 (age 25) | | | (Football Association of Malaysia) Kelana United |
| | MF | Nur Farah Wahida Norlee | 21 April 2001 (age 25) | 0 | 0 | (Football Association of Malaysia) KLFA |
| | MF | Zafirah Zulaikha Mohamad Zuhri | 23 January 2009 (age 17) | 0 | 0 | (Football Association of Malaysia) SSS Leopard FC |
| | MF | Nur Afrina Azhar | 6 July 1999 (age 27) | 0 | 0 | (Football Association of Malaysia) Young Tigress |
| | MF | Aryssa Da’im Mahrt | 18 April 2002 (age 24) | 0 | 0 | (United States Soccer Federation) Racing Power FC |
| | FW | Ayuna Anjani Lamsin | 1 October 2003 (age 23) | | | (Football Association of Malaysia) Selangor |
| | FW | Henrietta Justine | 19 August 2002 (age 24) | 19 | 1 | (Football Association of Malaysia) Sabah |
| | FW | Nur Adrienna Zamzaihiri | 13 August 2004 (age 22) | 13 | 3 | (Football Association of Malaysia) Sabah |
| | FW | Muskan Abdul Majid | 11 October 2005 (age 21) | 0 | 0 | (Football Association of Malaysia) Kelana United |
| | FW | Nornabilah Mohd Asmadi | 15 October 2005 (age 21) | 0 | 0 | (Football Association of Malaysia) Red Eagles |

=== Recent call ups ===
The following players have been called up in the past 12 months.

| Pos. | Player | Date of birth (age) | Caps | Goals | Club | Latest call-up |
|---|---|---|---|---|---|---|
| GK | Nurain Qaisara Muhammad Ali | (age 16) | | | (Malaysia) SMK Seksyen Sebelas Selangor | 2026 AFF Women's Cup |
| GK | Putri Aina Husna Mohd Subri | (age 15) | | | (Malaysia) Havana FC | |
| GK | Gabriella Sandham | (age 16) | | | (Malaysia) Havana FC | vs. Jordan & Palestine, June 2026 |
| GK | Nurul Azurin Mazlan | 27 January 2000 (age 26) | 50 | 0 | (Malaysia) Sabah | |
| GK | Nur Ezza Ashikin Abdul Razak | 18 April 2003 (age 23) | 6 | 0 | (Malaysia) Selangor | |
| GK | Nurdiana Syafiqah Mohd Rostam | 11 March 2008 (age 18) | - | - | (Malaysia) Kelana United | v. Hong Kong, 25 October 2025 |
| GK | Daliea Eliesa Mohd Hafiz | 22 October 2008 (age 18) | - | - | (Malaysia) Selangor | 2026 AFC Women's Asian Cup qualification |
| DF | Steffi Sarge Kaur | 25 October 1988 (age 38) | 35 | 4 | (Malaysia) Sabah | 2026 AFF Women's Cup |
| DF | Rosdianah Adeline Jerus | 11 August 2001 (age 25) | 35 | 4 | (Malaysia) Sabah | 2026 AFF Women's Cup |
| DF | Siti Zahirah Athirah Idris | (age 21) | | | (Malaysia) Selangor | 2026 AFF Women's Cup |
| DF | Tegen Su-Yin Butler | 25 December 2008 (age 17) | 2 | 0 | (United States) Davenport Iowa | 2026 AFF Women's Cup |
| DF | Nur Dhiyaa Addin Mohd Azhari | 12 March 2006 (age 20) | 1 | 0 | (Malaysia) Kelana United | |
| DF | Jessica Susanne Mailu | 18 August 2000 (age 26) | | | (Malaysia) Sabah | vs. Jordan & Palestine, June 2026 |
| DF | Chrisarellysa Richard | (age 18) | | | (Malaysia) Sabah | |
| DF | Arecha Pansie Efandi | (age 20) | | | (Malaysia) Sabah | |
| DF | Harrienianeeka Indran | (age 17) | | | (Malaysia) Selangor | |
| DF | Kanchenjeet Kaur Nanua | 5 July 2006 (age 20) | 4 | 0 | (Malaysia) Selangor | |
| DF | Nur Aliya Izzati Shamsudin | (age 21) | | | (Malaysia) BT3W FC Perak | |
| DF | Lauren Hoh Ruyi | 27 January 2006 (age 20) | | | (United States) Trinity Bantams | |
| DF | Nurfarisya Hanim Muhamad Zaki | 13 February 2004 (age 22) | - | - | (Malaysia) UPSI | 2026 AFC Women's Asian Cup qualification |
| DF | Putri Arissa Balqis Ab Llah | 26 August 2000 (age 26) | - | - | (Malaysia) UiTM | 2026 AFC Women's Asian Cup qualification |
| DF | Eva Oliviannie Antinus | 3 April 2001 (age 25) | - | - | (Malaysia) Sabah | |
| DF | Norfiralisna Sulaiman | 2 January 1997 (age 29) | - | - | (Malaysia) Kelana United | |
| DF | Shereilynn Elly Pius | 20 August 1991 (age 35) | - | - | (Malaysia) Sabah | v. Cambodia, 29 November 2024 |
| MF | Nur Syafiqah Zainal Abidin | 27 December 2001 (age 24) | 19 | 0 | (Malaysia) Kelana United | 2026 AFF Women's Cup |
| MF | Nur Ainsyah Murad | 22 October 2003 (age 23) | 15 | 2 | (Malaysia) Selangor | 2026 AFF Women's Cup |
| MF | Farahiyah Muhammad Ridzuan | 20 December 1993 (age 32) | | | (Malaysia) | vs. Jordan & Palestine, June 2026 |
| MF | Ku Nuwairah Ku Mahadzir | (age 19) | | | (Malaysia) Selangor | |
| MF | Hallyviana Joseph | (age 18) | | | (Malaysia) Sabah | |
| MF | Kaseh Carlmila Az Zahra | (age 20) | | | (Malaysia) Selangor | |
| MF | Qaseh Rania Khairul Najib | (age 16) | | | (Malaysia) Selangor | |
| MF | Nur Qistina Mohd Fais | (age 16) | 0 | 0 | (Malaysia) SSS Leopard FC | |
| MF | Haindee Mosroh | 17 April 1993 (age 33) | 40 | 6 | (Malaysia) Sabah | |
| MF | Waitie Taming | 12 April 2003 (age 23) | - | - | (Malaysia) Kelana United | 2025 Bangladesh Tri-Nations Cup |
| MF | Nurul Arliana Nabila Mohamad Ramadhan | 10 April 2003 (age 23) | - | - | (Malaysia) UPNM | |
| MF | Nurul Nadia Roslan | 13 March 2001 (age 25) | - | - | (Malaysia) Kelana United | |
| FW | Nurfazira Muhammad Sani | 13 November 2001 (age 25) | 16 | 2 | (Malaysia) Kelana United | 2026 AFF Women's Cup |
| FW | Keisha Adeliena Muhammad Khalid | (age 15) | | | (Malaysia) Havana FC | 2026 AFF Women's Cup |
| FW | Nur Laila Syamila A Rahim | 7 June 2010 (age 16) | 0 | 0 | (Malaysia) SSS Leopard FC | 2026 AFF Women's Cup |
| FW | Dian Aqilah Mohammed Imran | 10 October 2007 (age 19) | 5 | 0 | (Malaysia) Sabah | |
| FW | Dishanna Nagarajan Pillay | (age 16) | | | (Canada) Vancouver United FC | |
| FW | Rocillyeka Lole | 17 April 2008 (age 18) | | | (Malaysia) Sabah | |
| FW | Isabella O’Luanaigh | (age 14) | | | (Malaysia) Havana FC | |
| FW | Intan Sarah | 10 July 1999 (age 27) | 13 | 3 | (Malaysia) MBSJ | |

== Records ==
As of 29 November 2025

*Players in bold are still active, at least at club level.

=== Most capped players ===
| # | Player | Year(s) | Caps | Goals |
|---|---|---|---|---|
| 1 | **Jaciah Jumilis** | 2009– | 72 | 5 |
| 2 | Malini Nordin | 2007–2021 | 67 | 2 |
| 3 | **Nurul Azurin Mazlan** | 2016– | 50 | 0 |
| 4 | **Eslilah Esar** | 2007–2023 | 45 | 0 |
| 5 | Dadree Rofinus | 2009–2021 | 44 | 10 |
| 6 | Shereilynn Elly Pius | 2009–2024 | 42 | 8 |
| 7 | **Haindee Mosroh** | 2012– | 40 | 6 |
| 7 | Masturah Majid | 2008–2017 | 40 | 1 |
| 9 | Angela Kais | 2007–2017 | 37 | 8 |
| 10 | **Steffi Sarge Kaur** | 2007– | 35 | 4 |

=== Top goalscorers ===
| # | Player | Year(s) | Goals | Caps |
|---|---|---|---|---|
| 1 | Dadree Rofinus | 2009–2021 | 10 | 44 |
| 2 | Angela Kais | 2007–2017 | 8 | 37 |
| 2 | Shereilynn Elly Pius | 2009–2024 | 8 | 42 |
| 4 | Norhanisa Yahya | 2009-2019 | 7 | 29 |
5
| 5 | Nur Haniza Saarani | 2016–2019 | 6 | 12 |
| 5 | Norlelawati Ngah | 1999–2003 | 6 | 17 |
| 5 | Normala Rashid | 1980–1985 | 6 | 18 |
| 5 | Sihaya Ajad | 2011–2019 | 6 | 23 |
| 5 | **Haindee Mosroh** | 2012– | 6 | 40 |
| 10 | Norsuriani Mazli | 2011–2019 | 5 | 24 |
| 10 | **Jaciah Jumilis** | 2009– | 5 | 72 |

== Competitive record ==
Champions Runners-up Third place Fourth place

=== FIFA Women's World Cup ===
FIFA Women's World Cup record
| Year | Result | Position | GP | W | D* | L | GF | GA | GD |
|---|---|---|---|---|---|---|---|---|---|
| (China) 1991 | Did not qualify | | | | | | | | |
| (Sweden) 1995 | Did not enter | | | | | | | | |
| (United States) 1999 | Did not enter | | | | | | | | |
| (United States) 2003 | Did not enter | | | | | | | | |
| (China) 2007 | Did not enter | | | | | | | | |
| (Germany) 2011 | Did not enter | | | | | | | | |
| (Canada) 2015 | Did not enter | | | | | | | | |
| (France) 2019 | Did not enter | | | | | | | | |
| (Australia) (New Zealand) 2023 | Did not qualify | | | | | | | | |
| (Brazil) 2027 | Did not qualify | | | | | | | | |
| (Costa Rica) (Jamaica) (Mexico) (United States) 2031 | To be determined | | | | | | | | |
| (United Kingdom) 2035 | To be determined | | | | | | | | |
| Total | 0/12 | - | - | - | - | - | - | - | - |

*Draws include knockout matches decided on penalties.

=== Olympic Games ===
Olympic Games record
| Year | Round | Position | GP | W | D | L | GS | GA |
|---|---|---|---|---|---|---|---|---|
| (United States) 1996 to (France) 2024 | Did not enter | | | | | | | |
| (United States) 2028 | Did not qualify | | | | | | | |
| (Australia) 2032 | To be determined | | | | | | | |
| Total | 0/0 | — | – | – | – | – | – | – |

*Draws include knockout matches decided on penalties.

=== AFC Women's Asian Cup ===
AFC Women's Asian Cup record
| Year | Result | GP | W | D* | L | GF | GA | GD |
|---|---|---|---|---|---|---|---|---|
| (Hong Kong) 1975 | Fourth place | 4 | 1 | 0 | 3 | 3 | 11 | −8 |
| (Chinese Taipei) 1977 | Did not enter | | | | | | | |
| (India) 1980 | Fifth place | 5 | 1 | 1 | 3 | 4 | 5 | −1 |
| (Hong Kong) 1981 | Did not enter | | | | | | | |
| (Thailand) 1983 | Third place | 6 | 2 | 1 | 3 | 7 | 16 | −9 |
| (Hong Kong) 1986 | Group stage | 2 | 0 | 0 | 2 | 0 | 20 | −20 |
| (Hong Kong) 1989 | Did not enter | | | | | | | |
| (Japan) 1991 | Group stage | 4 | 1 | 1 | 2 | 1 | 24 | −23 |
| (Malaysia) 1993 | Group stage | 3 | 0 | 0 | 3 | 3 | 23 | −20 |
| (Malaysia) 1995 | Group stage | 2 | 0 | 0 | 2 | 1 | 11 | −10 |
| (China) 1997 | Did not enter | | | | | | | |
| (Philippines) 1999 | Group stage | 4 | 0 | 0 | 4 | 1 | 27 | −26 |
| (Chinese Taipei) 2001 | Group stage | 4 | 0 | 0 | 4 | 0 | 24 | −24 |
| (Thailand) 2003 | Did not enter | | | | | | | |
| (Australia) 2006 | Did not enter | | | | | | | |
| (Vietnam) 2008 | Did not qualify | | | | | | | |
| (China) 2010 | Did not enter | | | | | | | |
| (Vietnam) 2014 | Did not enter | | | | | | | |
| (Jordan) 2018 | Did not enter | | | | | | | |
| (India) 2022 | Did not qualify | | | | | | | |
| (Australia) 2026 | Did not qualify | | | | | | | |
| (Uzbekistan) 2029 | To be determined | | | | | | | |
| Total | 9/21 | 34 | 5 | 3 | 26 | 20 | 161 | −141 |

*Draws include knockout matches decided on penalties.

Notes:

- Red border colour indicates tournament was held on home soil.

=== Asian Games ===
Asian Games record
| Year | Result | GP | W | D | L | GF | GA | GD |
|---|---|---|---|---|---|---|---|---|
| 1990 to 2026 | Did not enter | | | | | | | |

*Draws include knockout matches decided on penalties.

=== AFF Women's Championship ===
AFF Women's Championship record
| Year | Result | GP | W | D | L | GF | GA | GD |
|---|---|---|---|---|---|---|---|---|
| (Vietnam) 2004 | Did not enter | | | | | | | |
| (Vietnam) 2006 | Did not enter | | | | | | | |
| (Myanmar) 2007 | Fourth place | 4 | 2 | 0 | 3 | 4 | 21 | −17 |
| (Vietnam) 2008 | Group stage | 4 | 0 | 0 | 4 | 1 | 24 | −23 |
| (Laos) 2011 | Group stage | 3 | 0 | 1 | 2 | 3 | 18 | −15 |
| (Vietnam) 2012 | Group stage | 2 | 0 | 0 | 2 | 2 | 7 | −5 |
| (Myanmar) 2013 | Group stage | 4 | 0 | 0 | 4 | 0 | 9 | −9 |
| (Vietnam) 2015 | Group stage | 3 | 0 | 0 | 3 | 0 | 14 | −14 |
| (Myanmar) 2016 | Group stage | 3 | 1 | 0 | 2 | 14 | 6 | +8 |
| (Indonesia) 2018 | Group stage | 4 | 2 | 0 | 2 | 8 | 15 | −7 |
| (Thailand) 2019 | Group stage | 4 | 2 | 0 | 2 | 9 | 10 | −1 |
| (Philippines) 2022 | Group stage | 5 | 0 | 2 | 3 | 1 | 15 | −14 |
| (Vietnam) 2025 | Did not qualify | | | | | | | |
| 2027 | Did not qualify | | | | | | | |
| Total | 10/14 | 36 | 7 | 3 | 27 | 42 | 139 | −97 |

=== AFF Women's Cup ===
| Year | Result | GP | W | D | L | GF | GA | GD |
|---|---|---|---|---|---|---|---|---|
| (Laos) 2024 | Group stage | 2 | 0 | 0 | 2 | 0 | 3 | –3 |
| (Malaysia) 2026 | Group stage | 2 | 0 | 1 | 1 | 2 | 4 | –2 |
| Total | 2/2 | 4 | 0 | 1 | 3 | 2 | 7 | –5 |

=== SEA Games ===
SEA Games record
| Year | Result | GP | W | D* | L | GF | GA | GD |
|---|---|---|---|---|---|---|---|---|
| (Thailand) 1985 | Did not enter | | | | | | | |
| (Thailand) 1995 | Silver medalists | 5 | 2 | 1 | 2 | 7 | 5 | +2 |
| (Indonesia) 1997 | Group stage | 2 | 0 | 1 | 1 | 1 | 2 | −1 |
| (Malaysia) 2001 | Group stage | 3 | 1 | 0 | 2 | 3 | 7 | −4 |
| (Vietnam) 2003 | Fourth place | 5 | 0 | 2 | 3 | 4 | 19 | −15 |
| (Philippines) 2005 | Did not enter | | | | | | | |
| (Thailand) 2007 | Group stage | 2 | 0 | 0 | 2 | 0 | 11 | −11 |
| (Laos) 2009 | Group stage | 4 | 0 | 0 | 4 | 1 | 34 | −33 |
| (Myanmar) 2013 | Fourth place | 4 | 1 | 0 | 3 | 4 | 17 | −13 |
| (Malaysia) 2017 | Fifth place | 4 | 0 | 0 | 4 | 1 | 19 | −18 |
| (Philippines) 2019 | Group stage | 2 | 0 | 0 | 2 | 0 | 10 | −10 |
| (Vietnam) 2021 | Did not enter | | | | | | | |
| (Cambodia) 2023 | Group stage | 3 | 0 | 0 | 3 | 1 | 9 | −8 |
| (Thailand) 2025 | Group stage | 3 | 0 | 0 | 3 | 0 | 16 | −16 |
| Total | 11/14 | 37 | 4 | 4 | 29 | 22 | 149 | −127 |

*Draws include knockout matches decided on penalties.

Notes:

- Red border colour indicates tournament was held on home soil.
- These matches are not regarded as part of the national team's record, nor are caps awarded.

== Honours and achievements ==
=== Continental ===
AFC Women's Championship
| Honours | Years | Head coach | Team |
|---|---|---|---|
| Third place | 1983 | (Malaysia) Shamdin Yusoff | |

=== Regional ===
Football at the Southeast Asian Games
| Honours | Years | Head coach | Team |
|---|---|---|---|
| Silver medal | 1995 | (Malaysia) Paramsivam Manickam | |

=== Summary ===
Overview
| Event | 1st place | 2nd place | 3rd place | 4th place |
|---|---|---|---|---|
| FIFA Women's World Cup | 0 | 0 | 0 | 0 |
| Summer Olympic Games | 0 | 0 | 0 | 0 |
| AFC Women's Asian Cup | 0 | 0 | 1 | 1 |
| Asian Games | 0 | 0 | 0 | 0 |
| AFF Women's Cup | 0 | 0 | 0 | 1 |
| SEA Games | 0 | 1 | 0 | 2 |
| Total | 0 | 1 | 1 | 2 |

== See also ==
- Sport in Malaysia
  - Football in Malaysia
    - Women's football in Malaysia
- Football Association of Malaysia
- Malaysia women's national football team
  - Malaysia women's national football team results
  - List of Malaysia women's international footballers born outside Malaysia
- Malaysia women's national under-20 football team
- Malaysia women's national under-17 football team
- Malaysia women's national futsal team
- Malaysia national football team
