= UiTM Stadium =

Sport stadium in Malaysia

Coordinates: 3.402164°N 101.7801864°E

- Interactive map of UiTM Stadium
- Location: Shah Alam, Selangor, Malaysia
- Owner: Universiti Teknologi MARA
- Capacity: 10,000
- Surface: Grass

Tenants
- UiTM United (2008–present); SPA; Selangor (2020); Bunga Raya Damansara (2024–2025); FAM-MSN Project Squad (2020–present); Selangor F.C. Under-23; Selangor F.C. Women

Stadium UiTM is a multi-purpose stadium located at Shah Alam, Selangor, Malaysia. Its capacity is 10,000. The stadium was built for Universiti Teknologi MARA and the UiTM Football Club. It can also be used as a rugby pitch. UiTM Stadium hosted a Malaysia national football team match against Maldives, on 26 November 2009. Malaysia lost the match 0–1.

== International football matches ==
Date	Competition	Team 1	Res.	Team 2
26 November 2009	Friendly	Malaysia	0–1	Maldives

== See also ==
- Sport in Malaysia
