= Football at the 2007 SEA Games =

Football Tournament at the 2007 SEA Games
Tournament details
- Host country: Thailand
- Dates: 1–14 December
- Teams: 8
- Venues: 4 (in 1 host city)

Final positions
- Champions: Thailand (men); Thailand (women)
- Runners-up: Myanmar (men); Vietnam (women)
- Third place: Singapore (men); Myanmar (women)
- Fourth place: Vietnam (men); Laos (women)

Tournament statistics
- Matches played: 16
- Goals scored: 56 (3.5 per match)
- Top scorer: (Thailand) Anon Sangsanoi (6 goals)

The association football tournament at the 2007 SEA Games was held from 1 to 14 December in Nakhon Ratchasima Province of Thailand. The men's tournament is played by U-23 (under 23 years old) national teams, while the women's tournament has no age limit.

Hosts Thailand won gold in both men's and women's tournament, beating Myanmar and Vietnam respectively, the former seeing them win their 8th straight gold medal. Singapore won the bronze medal at the men's tournament, their first after 12 years while Myanmar won bronze of the women's.

== Venues ==
=== Football ===
Nakhon Ratchasima
80th Birthday Stadium	Nakhon Ratchasima Municipal Stadium	Surapala Keetha Sathan Stadium	Municipality of Tumbon Mueangpug Stadium
Capacity: 20,000	Capacity: 4,000	Capacity: 4,000	Capacity: 2,000
Football at the 2007 SEA Games is located in Thailand

=== Futsal ===
Bangkok
Indoor Stadium Huamark
Capacity: 8,000
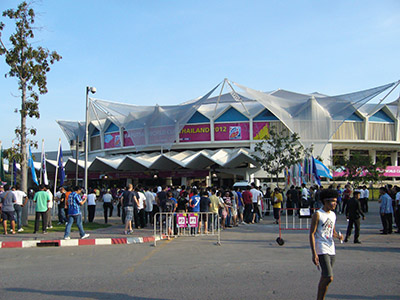

== Medal winners ==
=== Football ===
Event	Gold	Silver	Bronze
Men	Thailand (THA); Adul Lahsoh; Anon Sangsanoi; Apipoo Suntornpanavech; Arthit Sunthornpit; Chonlatit Jantakam; Ittipol Poolsap; Jeera Jarernsuk; Kiatprawut Saiwaeo; Natthaphong Samana; Noppol Pitafai; Prat Samakrat; Siwarak Tedsungnoen; Sompong Soleb; Suttinan Phuk-hom; Tana Chanabut; Teerasil Dangda; Teeratep Winothai; Weera Koedpudsa; Weerayut Jitkuntod; Wuttichai Tathong	Myanmar (MYA); Aung Myint Aye; Aung Myo Thant; Aye San; Hein Kyaw Thu; Khin Maung Lwin; Kyaw Htay Oo; Kyaw Thiha; Kyaw Zin Htet; Moe Win; Myo Min Tun; Nay Win; Pai Soe; Si Thu Win; Soe Lin Tun; Soe Thiha Aung; Than Si Thu; Tun Tun Win; Win Si Thu; Yazar Win Thein; Zaw Htet Aung	Singapore (SIN); Agu Casmir; Baihakki Khaizan; Erwan Gunawan; Fazrul Nawaz; Hafiz Osman; Hariss Harun; Hassan Sunny; Isa Halim; Ismail Yunos; Jasper Chan; Juma'at Jantan; Khairul Amri; Ridhuan Muhammad; Sevki Sha’ban; Shahril Alias; Shaiful Esah; Shariff Abdul Samat; Sharil Ishak; Tengku Mushadad; Yasir Hanapi
Women	Thailand (THA); Anootsara Maijarern; Benjawan Changauttha; Chidtawan Chawong; Darut Changplook; Duangnapa Sritala; Junpen Seesraum; Kitiya Thiangtham; Nisa Romyen; Panpradap Chinwong; Pikul Khueanpet; Pitsamai Sornsai; Siriporn Mungkhala; Sukunya Peangthem; Sunisa Srangthaisong; Supaporn Gaewbaen; Surachat Metta; Thidarat Wiwasukhu; Wajee Kertsombun; Waraporn Boonsing; Wilaiporn Boothduang	Vietnam (VIE); Bùi Thị Tuyết Mai; Đặng Thị Kiều Trinh; Đào Thị Miên; Đỗ Thị Hải Anh; Đỗ Thị Ngọc Châm; Đoàn Thị Kim Chi; Lê Thị Thương; Lê Thị Tuyết Mai; Nguyễn Thị Hương; Nguyễn Thị Kim Tiến; Nguyễn Thị Mai Lan; Nguyễn Thị Minh Nguyệt; Nguyễn Thị Nga; Nguyễn Thị Ngọc Anh; Nguyễn Thị Thanh Huyền; Nhiễu Thùy Linh; Trần Thị Kim Hồng; Từ Thị Phú; Văn Thị Thanh; Vũ Thị Huyễn Lình	Myanmar (MYA); Aye Nandar Hlaing; Khin Marlar Tun; Khin Moe Wai; Margret Marri; May Khuin Yamin; Moe Moe War; My Nilar Htwe; Myint Myint Aye; Nhin Si Myint; San San Maw; San San Thein; San Yu Naing; Sein Cho Aung; Shwa Sin Aung; Su Su Wai; Than Than Htwe; Thet Thet Win; Thin Thin Soe; Thu Zar Htwa; Zin Mar Wann

=== Futsal ===
Event	Gold	Silver	Bronze
Men	Thailand (THA); Anucha Munjarern; Ekkapan Suratsawang; Ekkapong Suratsawang; Kiatiyot Chalarmkhet; Lertchai Issarasuwipakorn; Natthapon Suttiroj; Nuttapun Namboonmee; Panomkorn Saisorn; Panuwat Janta; Parinya Pandee; Prasert Innui; Sermphan Khumthinkaew; Sukrit Rojjanametheesap; Surapong Tompa	Malaysia (MAS); Addie Azwan Zainal; Ahmad Hanif Sarmin; Ahmed Rizal Abdul Rahim; Devendran Supramaniam; Jamhuri Zainuddin; Mohamad Fadziki Abdul Karnim; Mohamad Feroz Abdul Karnim; Mohammad Faizul Abdul Gaffar; Mohd Hishamoddin Manjur; Mohd Ruzaley Abdul Aziz; Muhamad Fadhil Yusoff; Muizzudin Mohd Haris; Salim Zulkarnain; Zaidi Ramli	Indonesia (INA); Ade Lesmana; Ahmad Maulana; Andril Irawan; Angga Surya Saputra; Dede Sulaeman; Denny Handoyo; Israqul Issa; Jaelani Ladjanibi; Muhammad Amril Daulay; Maulana Mohammad Ihsan; Sayan Karmadi; Socrates Matulessy; Yos Adi Wicaksono
Women	Thailand (THA); Chownee Phanlert; Donta Litmun; Hathaichanok Tappakun; Hathairat Thongsri; Jiraprapa Tupsuri; Junjira Thanyajaluri; Kanyawee Sudtavee; Nipa Tiansawang; Nipaporn Sriwarom; Orathai Srimanee; Pavinee Netthip; Sasicha Phothiwong; Wannapa Kanha; Warind Patisang	Vietnam (VIE); Le Thi Vui; Luu Ngoc Mai; Nguyen Tam Thu; Nguyen Thi Duyen; Nguyen Thi Ha; Nguyen Thi My Kim; Nguyen Thi Nga; Nguyen Thi Tuyet Ma; Pham Thi Thanh Phuong; Phan Le Ai Duyen; Phan Thi Anh Dao; Phung Thi Minh Nguyet; Tran Thi Hong Linh; Truong Kim Ngan	Philippines (PHI); Anelita Servillon; Carla Paredes; Farpabeth Limbo; Francine Ruffy; Glaiza Artus; Glenda Bascon; Krishna Javier; Luzviminda Pacubas; Maria Aurora Tanjangco; Marigen Ariel; Miriam Merlin; Shella Ninobla; Simonette Gaspay; Tiffany Batungbacal

== Men's tournament ==
=== Participants ===
- Cambodia
- Indonesia
- Laos
- Malaysia
- Myanmar
- Vietnam
- Thailand
- Singapore

=== Group stage ===
==== Group A ====
Team	Pld	W	D	L	GF	GA	GD	Pts
Thailand	3	3	0	0	13	3	+10	9
Myanmar	3	1	1	1	8	5	+3	4
Indonesia	3	1	1	1	4	3	+1	4
Cambodia	3	0	0	3	3	17	−14	0

2 December 2007
15:30 UTC+7

Indonesia	3–1	Cambodia
Airlangga 39'; Wanggai 83'; Ardan 88'		Vathanak 81'

80th Birthday Stadium, Nakhon Ratchasima
Referee: Mohd Shabuddin Hamidin (Brunei)
2 December 2007
18:30 UTC+7

Myanmar	2–3	Thailand
Si Thu Than 71'; Prat 77' (o.g.)		Teeratep 45+1'; Wuttichai 51'; Teerasil 59'

80th Birthday Stadium, Nakhon Ratchasima
Referee: Suresh Srinivashan (India)

4 December 2007
15:30 UTC+7

Indonesia	0–0	Myanmar

80th Birthday Stadium, Nakhon Ratchasima
Referee: R. Krishnan (Malaysia)
4 December 2007
18:30 UTC+7

Cambodia	0–8	Thailand
		Apipoo 7'; Teeratep 40', 49'; Adul 43'; Anon 47', 83', 88'; Tana 67'

80th Birthday Stadium, Nakhon Ratchasima
Referee: Valentin Kovalenko (Uzbekistan)

7 December 2007
14:30 UTC+7

Myanmar	6–2	Cambodia
Si Thu Win 19', 60'; Ya Zar Win Thein 36'; Si Thu Than 45', 90+1'; Pai Soe 58'		Vathanak 20'; Sokumpheak 47'

80th Birthday Stadium, Nakhon Ratchasima
Referee: Thanh Ha Dang (Vietnam)
7 December 2007
19:45 UTC+7

Thailand	2–1	Indonesia
Teeratep 15'; Anon 45'		Jajang 17'

80th Birthday Stadium, Nakhon Ratchasima
Referee: Daud Abbas (Singapore)

==== Group B ====
Team	Pld	W	D	L	GF	GA	GD	Pts
Vietnam	3	2	0	1	7	5	+2	6
Singapore	3	1	2	0	5	4	+1	5
Malaysia	3	1	1	1	6	4	+2	4
Laos	3	0	1	2	1	6	−5	1

1 December 2007
15:30 UTC+7

Vietnam	3–1	Malaysia
Lê Công Vinh 47', 64'; Võ Duy Nam 80'		Chun Keng Hong 69'

Surapala Keetha Sathan Stadium, Nakhon Ratchasima
Referee: Jimmy Napitupulu (Indonesia)
1 December 2007
15:30 UTC+7

Singapore	0–0	Laos

Nakhon Ratchasima Municipal Stadium, Nakhon Ratchasima
Referee: Nuon Yin Monarath (Cambodia)

3 December 2007
15:30 UTC+7

Malaysia	4–0	Laos
Hadi 69'; Safee 76', 90+3'; Safiq 84'

Surapala Keetha Sathan Stadium, Nakhon Ratchasima
Referee: Chaiya Mahaprab (Thailand)
3 December 2007
15:30 UTC+7

Singapore	3–2	Vietnam
Đoàn Việt Cường 7' (o.g.); Fazrul 25'; Shahril I. 45+1'		Phan Thanh Bình 54'; Lê Công Vinh 90+2' (pen.)

Nakhon Ratchasima Municipal Stadium, Nakhon Ratchasima
Referee: Jimmy Napitupulu (Indonesia)

8 December 2007
15:30 UTC+7

Laos	1–2	Vietnam
Singto 16'		Đoàn Việt Cường 27'; Phan Thanh Bình 44'

Nakhon Ratchasima Municipal Stadium, Nakhon Ratchasima
Referee: Mohd Hamdidin Shahbuddin (Brunei)
8 December 2007
15:30 UTC+7

Malaysia	1–1	Singapore
Hadi 71'		Casmir 80'

Surapala Keetha Sathan Stadium, Nakhon Ratchasima
Referee: Chaiya Mahaprab (Thailand)

=== Knockout stages ===
Semi-finals
11 December
Vietnam	0 (1)
Myanmar (p)	0 (3)
11 December
Thailand	3
Singapore	0

Final
14 December
Myanmar	0
Thailand	2
Third place
14 December
Vietnam	0
Singapore	5

==== Semi-finals ====
11 December 2007
14:30 UTC+7

Vietnam	0–0 (a.e.t.)	Myanmar
Penalties
Lê Công Vinh (penalty scored); Nguyễn Vũ Phong (penalty missed); Mai Xuân Hợp (penalty missed); Nguyễn Thành Long Giang (penalty missed)	1–3	(penalty scored) Zaw Htet Aung; (penalty missed) Myo Min Tun; (penalty scored) Yazar Win Thein; (penalty scored) Moe Win

Nakhon Ratchasima Municipal Stadium, Nakhon Ratchasima
Referee: R. Krishnan (Malaysia)

11 December 2007
19:45 UTC+7

Thailand	3–0	Singapore
Wuttichai 22'; Anon 45'; Prat 77'

80th Birthday Stadium, Nakhon Ratchasima
Referee: Valentin Kovalenko (Uzbekistan)

==== Bronze-medal match ====
14 December 2007
UTC+7

Vietnam	0–5	Singapore
		Shahril I. 37'; Fazrul 44', 52', 56'; Casmir 79'

80th Birthday Stadium, Nakhon Ratchasima
Referee: Suresh Srinivashan (India)

==== Gold-medal match ====
14 December 2007
UTC+7

Myanmar	0–2	Thailand
		Anon 15'; Teeratep 39'

80th Birthday Stadium, Nakhon Ratchasima
Referee: R. Krishnan (Malaysia)

=== Winners ===
2007 SEA Games Men's Tournament
(Thailand)
Thailand
Thirteenth title

=== Goalscorers ===
6 goals

- (Thailand) Anon Sangsanoi

5 goals

- (Thailand) Teerathep Winothai

4 goals

- (Singapore) Fazrul Nawaz

3 goals

- (Vietnam) Lê Công Vinh
- (Myanmar) Si Thu Than

2 goals

- (Cambodia) Teab Vathanak
- (Malaysia) Mohd Safee Mohd Sali
- (Malaysia) Mohd Amirul Hadi Zainal
- (Myanmar) Si Thu Win
- (Singapore) Sharil Ishak
- (Singapore) Agu Casmir
- (Thailand) Wuttichai Tathong
- (Vietnam) Phan Thanh Bình

1 goal

- (Cambodia) Kouch Sokumpheak
- (Indonesia) Airlangga Sucipto
- (Indonesia) Imanuel Wanggai
- (Indonesia) Ardan Aras
- (Indonesia) Jajang Mulyana
- (Laos) Lamnao Singto
- (Malaysia) Chun Keng Hong
- (Malaysia) Mohd Safiq Rahim
- (Myanmar) Yazar Win Thein
- (Myanmar) Pai Soe
- (Thailand) Teerasil Dangda
- (Thailand) Apipu Suntornpanavej
- (Thailand) Adul Lahso
- (Thailand) Tana Chanabut
- (Thailand) Prat Samakrat
- (Vietnam) Võ Duy Nam
- (Vietnam) Đoàn Việt Cường

Own goals

- (Thailand) Prat Samakrat (Playing against Myanmar)
- (Vietnam) Đoàn Việt Cường (Playing against Singapore)

=== Final ranking ===
Pos	Team	Pld	W	D	L	GF	GA	GD	Pts	Final result
1	Thailand (H)	5	5	0	0	18	3	+15	15	Gold Medal
2	Myanmar	5	1	2	2	8	7	+1	5	Silver Medal
3	Singapore	5	2	2	1	10	7	+3	8	Bronze Medal
4	Vietnam	5	2	1	2	7	10	−3	7	Fourth place
5	Malaysia	3	1	1	1	10	8	+2	4	Eliminated in group stage
6	Indonesia	3	1	1	1	4	3	+1	4	Eliminated in group stage
7	Laos	3	0	1	2	1	6	−5	1	Eliminated in group stage
8	Cambodia	3	0	0	3	3	17	−14	0	Eliminated in group stage

(H) Hosts

== Women's tournament ==
=== Participants ===
- Laos
- Malaysia
- Myanmar
- Philippines
- Thailand
- Vietnam

==== Group A ====
Team	Pld	W	D	L	GF	GA	GD	Pts
Vietnam	2	2	0	0	14	1	+13	6
Laos	2	0	1	1	3	6	−3	1
Philippines	2	0	1	1	2	12	−10	1

3 December 2007
15:15 UTC+7

Laos	2–2	Philippines
Souphavanh 39'; Sengmany 61'		P. Impelido 48'; Agravante 50'

Municipality of Tumbon Mueangpug Stadium, Nakhon Ratchasima
Referee: Rita Gani (Malaysia)

5 December 2007
15:15 UTC+7

Philippines	0–10	Vietnam
		Đỗ Thị Ngọc Châm 19', 33', 39', 44'; Đoàn Thị Kim Chi 23', 36'; Trần Thị Kim Hồng 53'; Nguyễn Thị Minh Nguyệt 61', 76'; Bùi Thị Tuyết Mai 78'

Municipality of Tumbon Mueangpug Stadium, Nakhon Ratchasima
Referee: Daw San San Myint (Myanmar)

8 December 2007
15:15 UTC+7

Vietnam	4–1	Laos
Bùi Thị Tuyết Mai 2'; Inthasvong 45' (o.g.); Vũ Thị Huyền Linh 62'; Nguyễn Thị Minh Nguyệt 72'		Sayasanh 64'

Municipality of Tumbon Mueangpug Stadium, Nakhon Ratchasima
Referee: Praew Semaksuk (Thailand)

==== Group B ====
Team	Pld	W	D	L	GF	GA	GD	Pts
Thailand	2	1	1	0	8	2	+6	4
Myanmar	2	1	1	0	7	2	+5	4
Malaysia	2	0	0	2	0	11	−11	0

2 December 2007
15:15 UTC+7

Thailand	6–0	Malaysia
Junpen 9', 25'; Nisa 14'; Pitsamai 53'; Supaporn 87'; Sunisa 89'

Municipality of Tumbon Mueangpug Stadium, Nakhon Ratchasima
Referee: Mai Hoang Trang (Vietnam)

4 December 2007
15:15 UTC+7

Malaysia	0–5	Myanmar
		Moe Moe War 8'; Khin Marlar Tun 41', 89'; My Nilar Htwe 63'; Maragat Marri 69'

Municipality of Tumbon Mueangpug Stadium, Nakhon Ratchasima
Referee: Mai Hoang Trang (Vietnam)

7 December 2007
15:15 UTC+7

Myanmar	2–2	Thailand
San Yu Naing 10'; Khin Marlar Tun 29'		Nisa 42'; Anootsara 72' (pen.)

Municipality of Tumbon Mueangpug Stadium, Nakhon Ratchasima
Referee: Rita Gani (Malaysia)

=== Knockout stages ===
Semi-finals
10 December
Thailand	8
Laos	0
10 December
Vietnam (a.e.t.)	2
Myanmar	1

Final
13 December
Thailand	2
Vietnam	0
Third place
13 December
Laos	0
Myanmar	5

==== Semi-finals ====
10 December 2007
14:30 UTC+7

Thailand	8–0	Laos
Nisa 10', 59'; Junpen 36', 75'; Anootsara 50'; Supaporn 61'; Pitsamai 69'; Kitiya 87'

Municipality of Tumbon Mueangpug Stadium, Nakhon Ratchasima
Referee: Daw San San Myint (Myanmar)
10 December 2007
14:30 UTC+7

Vietnam	2–1 (a.e.t.)	Myanmar
Đoàn Thị Kim Chi 49'; Nguyễn Thị Minh Nguyệt 101'		San Yu Naing 41'

Nakhon Ratchasima Municipal Stadium, Nakhon Ratchasima
Referee: Praew Semaksuk (Thailand)

==== Bronze-medal match ====
13 December 2007
13:30 UTC+7

Myanmar	5–0	Laos
Sehhonivong 12' (o.g.); Aye Nandar Hlaing 34', 69'; Margrat Marri 39'; San Yu Naing 90+1'

Nakhon Ratchasima Municipal Stadium, Nakhon Ratchasima
Referee: Rita Gani (Malaysia)

==== Gold-medal match ====
13 December 2007
14:30 UTC+7

Thailand	2–0	Vietnam
Pitsamai 61'; Anootsara 71' (pen.)

Nakhon Ratchasima Municipal Stadium, Nakhon Ratchasima
Referee: Rita Gani (Malaysia)

=== Winners ===
2007 SEA Games Women's Tournament

Thailand
Fourth title

=== Goalscorers ===
4 goals

- (Thailand) Junpen Seesraum
- (Thailand) Nisa Romyen
- (Vietnam) Đỗ Thị Ngọc Châm
- (Vietnam) Nguyễn Thị Minh Nguyệt

3 goals

- (Myanmar) Khin Marlar Tun
- (Myanmar) San Yu Naing
- (Thailand) Anootsara Maijarern
- (Thailand) Pitsamai Sornsai
- (Vietnam) Đoàn Thị Kim Chi

2 goals

- (Myanmar) Aye Nandar Hlaing
- (Myanmar) Margrat Marri
- (Thailand) Supaporn Gaewbaen
- (Vietnam) Bùi Thị Tuyết Mai

1 goal

- (Laos) Johny Sayasanh
- (Laos) Phaivanh Souphavanh
- (Laos) Teng Sengmany
- (Myanmar) Moe Moe War
- (Myanmar) My Nilar Htwe
- (Philippines) Edna Agravante
- (Philippines) Patrice Impelido
- (Thailand) Kitiya Thiangtham
- (Thailand) Sunisa Srangthaisong
- (Vietnam) Trần Thị Kim Hồng
- (Vietnam) Vũ Thị Huyền Linh

Own goal

- (Laos) Khuanta Sehhonivong (Playing against Myanmar)
- (Laos) Sangvan Inthasvong (Playing against Vietnam)

=== Final ranking ===
Pos	Team	Pld	W	D	L	GF	GA	GD	Pts	Final result
1	Thailand (H)	4	3	1	0	18	2	+16	10	Gold Medal
2	Vietnam	4	3	0	1	16	4	+12	9	Silver Medal
3	Myanmar	4	2	1	1	13	4	+9	7	Bronze Medal
4	Laos	4	0	1	3	3	19	−16	1	Fourth place
5	Philippines	2	0	1	1	2	12	−10	1	Eliminated in group stage
6	Malaysia	2	0	0	2	0	11	−11	0	Eliminated in group stage

(H) Hosts

Preceded by 2005	Football at the SEA Games; 2007 SEA Games	Succeeded by 2009
