= Postage stamps and postal history of Indochina =

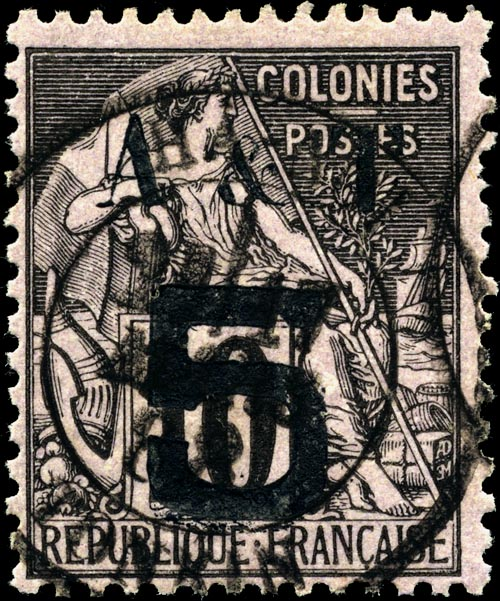
5c Annam & Tonkin overprint cancelled at Hanoi

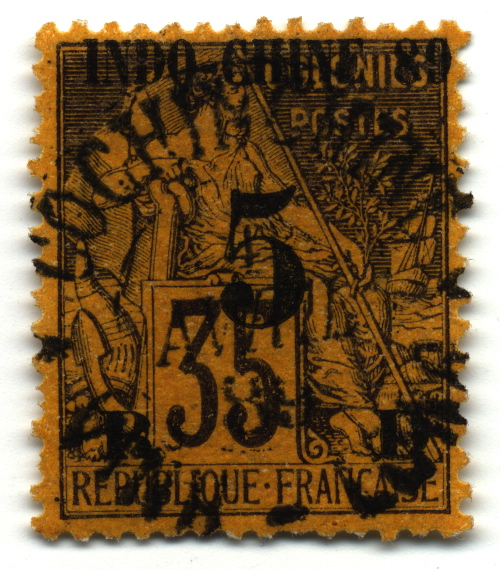
5c overprint of 1889 cancelled at Vinh Long

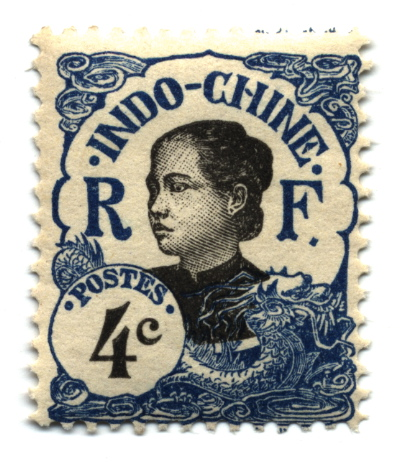
4c stamp of 1907, depicting Annamite girl

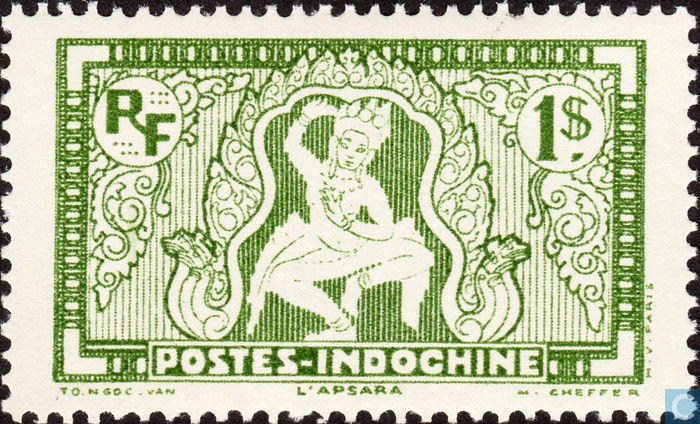
Apsara on a 1931 stamp

This is a survey of the postage stamps and postal history of Indochina.

== First stamps ==
The postage stamps of French Indochina begin on May 16, 1886, with the overprinting of "5" or "5 C. CH." on the generic stamps of the French Colonies, for use in Cochinchina (mainly Saigon).

On January 21, 1888, stamps crudely overprinted A & T (meaning Annam & Tonkin), along with a "1" or "5", and also on the generic colonies stamps, were issued for those territories. The example at right was cancelled at Hanoi (spelled "HA-NOI") in Tonkin, on 17 March 1888.

The 1889 unification of colonial administration first resulted in surcharges in January 1889, on the 35c French Colonies stamp, reading INDO-CHINE 89 / 5 / R D (8 January) and INDO-CHINE / 1889 / R - D (10 January), where the "R" referred to the colonial governor P. Richaud, and the "D" to the postmaster at Saigon, General P. Demars. The example illustrated at right was cancelled at Vinh Long, a town of the Mekong Delta, on 4 April 1889, just a few months after the stamp was issued.

== First regular stamps ==
In 1892 the first five regular stamps of Indochina were issued as part of the standard Navigation and Commerce, and inscribed INDO-CHINE. Three succeeding ones were issued in 1900, and two in 1902 - all in the same basic design with different colors.

Inscription of INDO-CHINE in the typical blank box at the bottom was replaced with printing of INDO-CHINE FRANCAISE from the definite stamps issued in 1904.

Subsequent issues included an attractive and artistic set featuring native women (1907), a surcharged set of 1919 necessitated by the changeover from centimes and francs to cents and piasters in the previous year, and a reprinted set valued in the new currency, starting with a 1/10-cent denomination.

Sets featuring local sights appeared in 1927, 1931, and in 1936 depicting cultural views like a farmer plowing the ground or constructions, Apsara, and native emperors of Annam and Cambodie. They are followed by a variety of commemoratives honoring notable figures, up to a last airmail issue June 13, 1949, which was issued in only small numbers due to the growing rebellion.

A number of the 1940s issues were later overprinted and used by the Viet Minh

== See also ==
- Postage stamps of the French Colonies
- Postage stamps and postal history of Annam and Tongking
- Postage stamps and postal history of Vietnam
- Postage stamps and postal history of Cambodia
- Postage stamps and postal history of Laos

== Sources ==
- Stanley Gibbons Ltd: various catalogues
- Encyclopaedia of Postal Authorities
- Rossiter, Stuart & John Flower. The Stamp Atlas. London: Macdonald, 1986. ISBN 0-356-10862-7
