= Anootsara Maijarern =

Thai footballer (born 1986)

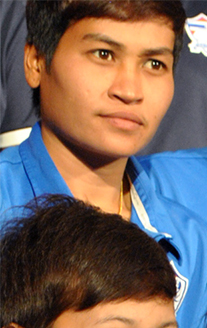

Personal information
- Full name: Anootsara Maijarern
- Date of birth: 14 February 1986 (age 40)
- Place of birth: Surin, Thailand
- Height: 1.63 m (5 ft 4 in)
- Position: Defender

International career^{‡}
Years	Team	Apps	(Gls)
2006–2015	Thailand	83	(21)
- ‡ National team caps and goals as of 22:48, 17 June 2015 (UTC)

Anootsara Maijarern (Thai: อนุชศรา หมายเจริญ, born 14 February 1986) is a Thai international footballer who plays as a defender.

== Honours ==
=== International ===
- AFF Women's Championship Winner (2): 2011, 2015
- Southeast Asian Games Gold Medal (2): 2007, 2013

== International goals ==
No.	Date	Venue	Opponent	Score	Result	Competition
1.	8 June 2003	Rajamangala Stadium, Bangkok, Thailand	Singapore	3–0	3–0	2003 AFC Women's Championship
2.	7 December 2007	Municipality of Tumbon Mueangpug, Nakhon Ratchasima, Thailand	Myanmar	2–2	2–2	2007 Southeast Asian Games
3.	10 December 2007	Municipality of Tumbon Mueangpug, Nakhon Ratchasima, Thailand	Laos	3–0	8–0	2007 Southeast Asian Games
4.	13 December 2007	Nakhon Ratchasima Municipal Stadium, Nakhon Ratchasima, Thailand	Vietnam	2–0	2–0	2007 Southeast Asian Games
5.	26 March 2008	80th Birthday Stadium, Nakhon Ratchasima, Thailand	Philippines	1–0	9–0	2008 AFC Women's Asian Cup qualification
6.	13 October 2008	Thành Long Sports Centre, Hồ Chí Minh City, Vietnam	Philippines	7–0	12–0	2008 AFF Women's Championship
7.	20 October 2008	Thành Long Sports Centre, Hồ Chí Minh City, Vietnam	Myanmar	1–0	3–0	2008 AFF Women's Championship
8.	20 October 2008	Thành Long Sports Centre, Hồ Chí Minh City, Vietnam	Myanmar	2–0	3–0	2008 AFF Women's Championship
9.	4 July 2009	Rajamangala Stadium, Bangkok, Thailand	Uzbekistan	1–0	6–1	2010 AFC Women's Asian Cup qualification
10.	4 July 2009	Rajamangala Stadium, Bangkok, Thailand	Uzbekistan	4–1	6–1	2010 AFC Women's Asian Cup qualification
11.	8 July 2009	Rajamangala Stadium, Bangkok, Thailand	Iran	3–0	8–1	2010 AFC Women's Asian Cup qualification
12.	8 July 2009	Rajamangala Stadium, Bangkok, Thailand	Iran	4–0	8–1	2010 AFC Women's Asian Cup qualification
13.	20 March 2011	Kaohsiung National Stadium, Kaohsiung, Taiwan	Chinese Taipei	1–0	3–0	2012 Summer Olympics qualification
14.	23 October 2011	New Laos National Stadium, Vientiane, Laos	Laos	1–0	4–0	2011 AFF Women's Championship
15.	23 October 2011	New Laos National Stadium, Vientiane, Laos	Laos	3–0	4–0	2011 AFF Women's Championship
16.	23 October 2011	New Laos National Stadium, Vientiane, Laos	Laos	4–0	4–0	2011 AFF Women's Championship
17.	18 September 2012	Thống Nhất Stadium, Hồ Chí Minh City, Vietnam	Laos	1–0	3–0	2012 AFF Women's Championship
18.	22 September 2012	Thống Nhất Stadium, Hồ Chí Minh City, Vietnam	Laos	10–1	14–1	2012 AFF Women's Championship
19.	25 May 2013	Bangabandhu National Stadium, Dhaka, Bangladesh	Bangladesh	3–0	5–1	2014 AFC Women's Asian Cup qualification
20.	14 December 2013	Mandalarthiri Stadium, Mandalay, Myanmar	Malaysia	1–0	6–1	2013 Southeast Asian Games
21.	14 December 2013	Mandalarthiri Stadium, Mandalay, Myanmar	Malaysia	2–0	6–1	2013 Southeast Asian Games
22.	16 December 2013	Mandalarthiri Stadium, Mandalay, Myanmar	Laos	1–0	5–0	2013 Southeast Asian Games
23.	16 December 2013	Mandalarthiri Stadium, Mandalay, Myanmar	Laos	3–0	5–0	2013 Southeast Asian Games
24.	16 December 2013	Mandalarthiri Stadium, Mandalay, Myanmar	Laos	4–0	5–0	2013 Southeast Asian Games
25.	20 December 2013	Mandalarthiri Stadium, Mandalay, Myanmar	Vietnam	2–1	2–1	2013 Southeast Asian Games
26.	3 May 2015	Thống Nhất Stadium, Hồ Chí Minh City, Vietnam	Indonesia	2–0	10–1	2015 AFF Women's Championship
27.	3 May 2015	Thống Nhất Stadium, Hồ Chí Minh City, Vietnam	Indonesia	3–0	10–1	2015 AFF Women's Championship
28.	16 September 2015	Mandalarthiri Stadium, Mandalay, Myanmar	Myanmar	1–0	2–1	2016 AFC Women's Olympic Qualifying Tournament
29.	16 September 2015	Mandalarthiri Stadium, Mandalay, Myanmar	Myanmar	2–0	2–1	2016 AFC Women's Olympic Qualifying Tournament
30.	18 September 2015	Mandalarthiri Stadium, Mandalay, Myanmar	Jordan	1–0	1–0	2016 AFC Women's Olympic Qualifying Tournament
31.	28 July 2016	Mandalarthiri Stadium, Mandalay, Myanmar	Singapore	1–0	8–0	2016 AFF Women's Championship
32.	28 July 2016	Mandalarthiri Stadium, Mandalay, Myanmar	Singapore	7–0	8–0	2016 AFF Women's Championship
33.	28 July 2016	Mandalarthiri Stadium, Mandalay, Myanmar	Singapore	8–0	8–0	2016 AFF Women's Championship
