= Postage stamps and postal history of Vietnam =

The postage stamps of Vietnam were issued by a variety of states and administrations. Stamps were first introduced by the French colonial administration. Stamps specifically for Vietnam were first issued in 1945. During the decades of conflict and partitioning, stamps were issued by mutually hostile governments. The reunification of Vietnam in 1976 brought about a unified postal service.

== Advent of Vietnamese stamps ==
Stamps in Vietnam were first introduced by the French colonial administration in 1862. The stamps of these decades were initially of the general French colonial series. In the 1880s, some of these were overprinted locally for Cochinchina (1886–1888), Annam and Tonkin (1888) and French Indochina (1889). Subsequently, definitive stamps of French Indochina were issued. The colony of French Indochina consisted of present-day Vietnam, Cambodia and Laos. Stamps specifically for Vietnam were first issued in 1945.

During the Japanese occupation of French Indochina (1940–1945), the colonial administration did not receive fresh supplies of stamps from France. For this reason they resorted to printing their own stamps at a print shop in Hanoi. These stamps were of lower quality than the pre-war stamps, and in addition, the machinery used for this purpose gradually deteriorated, with limited possibilities of repairing it.

French Indochina stamp printed in Hanoi during the Japanese occupation (left), similar stamp overprinted "VIET-NAM DAN-CHU CONG-HOA" (Democratic Republic of Vietnam) (center) and a 1946 definitive stamp of the republic (right). Some of the overprints were explicitly political in nature, e.g. "Quoc Phong" (national defence).

The advent of stamps specifically for Vietnam came with the defeat of Japan in 1945. In Vietnam, the Japanese surrender paved the way for the anti-Japanese Viet Minh movement, which presided over a guerilla army, to seize key cities and political power in Vietnam. During 1945–1946, the Viet Minh government issued a large number of provisional postage stamps. These stamps were manufactured by adding an overprint to remaining stocks of the war-era stamps of French Indochina. Eventually, a set of definitive stamps depicting Ho Chi Minh were issued in 1946.

1951 30 piastres stamp issued by the Bảo Đại government

The ensuing conflict between the returning French troops and the Viet Minh government brought an end to the initial series of Viet Minh stamps. During the conflict, stamps were issued in various Viet Minh held regions, while new issues of French Indochina stamps were used in areas controlled by the French. Around 1950, national governments for Vietnam, Cambodia and Laos were established, each issuing stamps and coins in their own names. The first stamps of the Bảo Đại government in Vietnam were issued in 1951. These stamps supplanted the French Indochina stamps in the French controlled areas of Vietnam.

With the peace agreement in 1954, Vietnam was partitioned into a northern and a southern state. Each issued its own stamps.

== North Vietnam (1954–1976) ==
1966 North Vietnam stamp

Many stamps of North Vietnam were printed in Hanoi, while others were printed abroad, e.g., in Prague, Czechoslovakia, (1958–59) and subsequently in Budapest, Hungary.

== South Vietnam (1954–1976) ==
1971 South Vietnam stamp commemorating the first anniversary of the "Land to the Tiller" Law

The stamps of South Vietnam were mostly printed in Paris, Tokyo, England (by De La Rue) and Rome during 1954–1967, in Japan during 1967–1973 and in England (by De La Rue) during 1973–1975.

Stamps used by military personnel were printed locally and are of inferior quality.

1965 NLF stamp

Between 1963 and 1976, the insurgent National Front for the Liberation of South Vietnam (the NLF or "Viet Cong") issued their own stamps. These were printed in Hanoi. When the Republic of Vietnam was toppled in May 1975, the NFL government became the sole stamp issuing authority, until the reunification of Vietnam one year later.

== Reunified Vietnam (1976–) ==
2007 miniature sheet commemorating the Central Highlands gong culture festival

The reunification of Vietnam in July 1976 brought about a unified postal service. This effectively consisted of the postal administration in Hanoi operating throughout Vietnam. Indeed, the stamps issued in July and August 1976 still had the name of the North Vietnamese state printed on them, while later issues have simply "Việt Nam" and "bưu chính" (post). As in North Vietnam, post-reunification stamps were partly printed in Vietnam and partly abroad. Domestically printed stamps were printed in Hanoi 1976–1987 and subsequently in Saigon. During 1983–1990 most stamp issues were printed in Havana, Cuba, these were of a superior printing quality. Eventually, the postal service acquired improved technology from Germany. Since 1990 all stamps of Vietnam have been produced domestically.

== Relations with the collector market ==
Many stamp sets of North Vietnam and post-reunification Vietnam are available imperforate, as opposed to the regular perforated versions. This goes for stamps printed domestically and abroad. At present [when?], Vietnamese stamps are officially offered in both regular, imperforate and specimen versions. The imperforate and specimen versions serve no postal purpose and are thus entirely aimed at the collector community.

During the war of independence (1946–1954) and immediate aftermath, some stamps were issued imperforate due to technical shortcomings. These may, of course, have inspired later collector oriented imperforates.

Apart from the regular issues (for postal use), a large proportion of the stamps of Vietnam have been made available to collectors as cancelled-to-order (CTO) versions. The Havana printed stamps of the 1980s usually have the CTO cancellation printed directly onto the stamp along with the rest of the design and are solely aimed at the collector community. While the majority of the stamps of this category found in the collector market are CTO versions, this should not overshadow the fact that similar stamps (non-CTO editions) are found postally used.

While a large proportion of the stamps of the 1980s appear to deliberately appeal to thematic collectors (cars, dogs, cats, etc.), 21st century stamps are broader in scope, and the issue rate has declined. This seems to reflect a shift in issuing policy away from the orientation towards thematic collectors, thus making the field of Vietnamese stamps more appealing in its own right.

== See also ==
- Postage stamps of the French Colonies
- Postal history of Annam and Tongking
- Postage stamps and postal history of Indochina

== References and sources ==
Notes

Sources

- Stanley Gibbons stamp catalogue. Part 21, South-East Asia, 3rd ed. London: Stanley Gibbons. 1995. ISBN 0-85259-389-9.
- Yvert & Tellier Catalogue de Timbres-Poste. Vol. I, France. Amiens: Yvert & Tellier. 1973.
