= 2004 OFC Women's Under 19 Qualifying Tournament squads =

This article lists the squads for the 2004 OFC Women's Under 19 Qualifying Tournament.

Each squad consisted of up to twenty players in total.

== Australia ==
Australia's squad was named on 10 April 2004.

No.	Pos.	Player	Date of birth (age)	Caps	Goals	Club
1	GK	Alison Logue	March 6, 1987 (aged 17)	0	0	(Football Australia) NSWIS
2	DF	Elissia Canham	April 29, 1985 (aged 18)			(Football Australia) QAS
3	DF	Nicole Somi	January 19, 1987 (aged 17)	0	0	(Football Australia) ACTAS
4	DF	Emma Davison (c)	May 4, 1985 (aged 18)			(Football Australia) QAS
5	DF	Ellen Beaumont	July 14, 1985 (aged 18)	0	0	(Football Australia) QAS
6	MF	Sally Shipard	October 20, 1987 (aged 16)	0	0	(Football Australia) NSWIS
7	MF	Kylie Ledbrook	March 20, 1986 (aged 18)	0	0	(Football Australia) NSWIS
8	MF	Lauren Colthorpe	October 25, 1985 (aged 18)	0	0	(Football Australia) NSWIS
9	FW	Selin Kuralay	January 25, 1985 (aged 19)			(Football Australia) QAS
10	MF	Leah Blayney	October 28, 1986 (aged 17)			(Football Australia) AIS
11	FW	Katie Hilder	March 25, 1985 (aged 19)	0	0	(Football Australia) NSWIS
12	DF	Julia Bazi	October 20, 1985 (aged 18)	0	0	(Football Australia) NSWIS
13	DF	Kim Carroll	September 2, 1987 (aged 16)	0	0	(Football Australia) QAS
14	FW	Renee Cartwright	February 3, 1986 (aged 18)	0	0	(Football Australia) NSWIS
15	FW	Leena Khamis	June 19, 1986 (aged 17)	0	0	(Football Australia) NSWIS
16	FW	Alannah Reed	January 28, 1988 (aged 16)	0	0	(Football Australia) QAS
17	FW	Jenna Tristram	October 28, 1986 (aged 17)	0	0	(Football Australia) NSWIS
20	GK	Claire O'Shea	December 2, 1985 (aged 18)	0	0	(Football Australia) VIS

== Papua New Guinea ==
No.	Pos.	Player	Date of birth (age)	Club
1	GK	Josepha Nion		
2		Beverly Bilie		
3	DF	Edith Sabaewa		
4	DF	Martha Kiapin		
5	DF	Karen Dobbin		
6	FW	Esther Muta		
7		Cecily Dobbin		
8		Cecilia Dobbin		
9		Patricia Logha		
10	MF	Caroline Moeder		
11		Talita Dobbin		
12		Samantha Peninsa		
13		Francisca Mandoni		
14		Ludy Sabaewa		
15		Aileen Lepani		
16	MF	Jacqueline Chalau		
17		Jenny Mogi		
18	FW	Neilen Limbai		
19		Helen Samba		
20	GK	Kiwi Toba		

== Solomon Islands ==
No.	Pos.	Player	Date of birth (age)	Caps	Goals	Club
1	GK	Betty Sade		0	0	
2		Rose Gwali	July 7, 1986 (aged 17)	0	0	
3		Gael Donga		0	0	
4		Belinda Susana		0	0	
5		Elsie Ringi		0	0	
6		Rafe Akau Bello		0	0	
7		Elizabeth Kalae		0	0	
8		Fiona Komole		0	0	
9	MF	Esther Buga		0	0	
10		Ellen Vakatao		0	0	
11		Ednah Donga		0	0	
12		Noelyn Wagapu		0	0	
13		Julie Oge		0	0	
14		Alice Suluna		0	0	
15		Lisa Malefo		0	0	
16		Margaret Pisu		0	0	
17	MF	Vanessa Inifiri		0	0	
18		Mary Dongai		0	0	
19		Lavinia Daonanita		0	0	
20		Mendilyn Pita		0	0	
