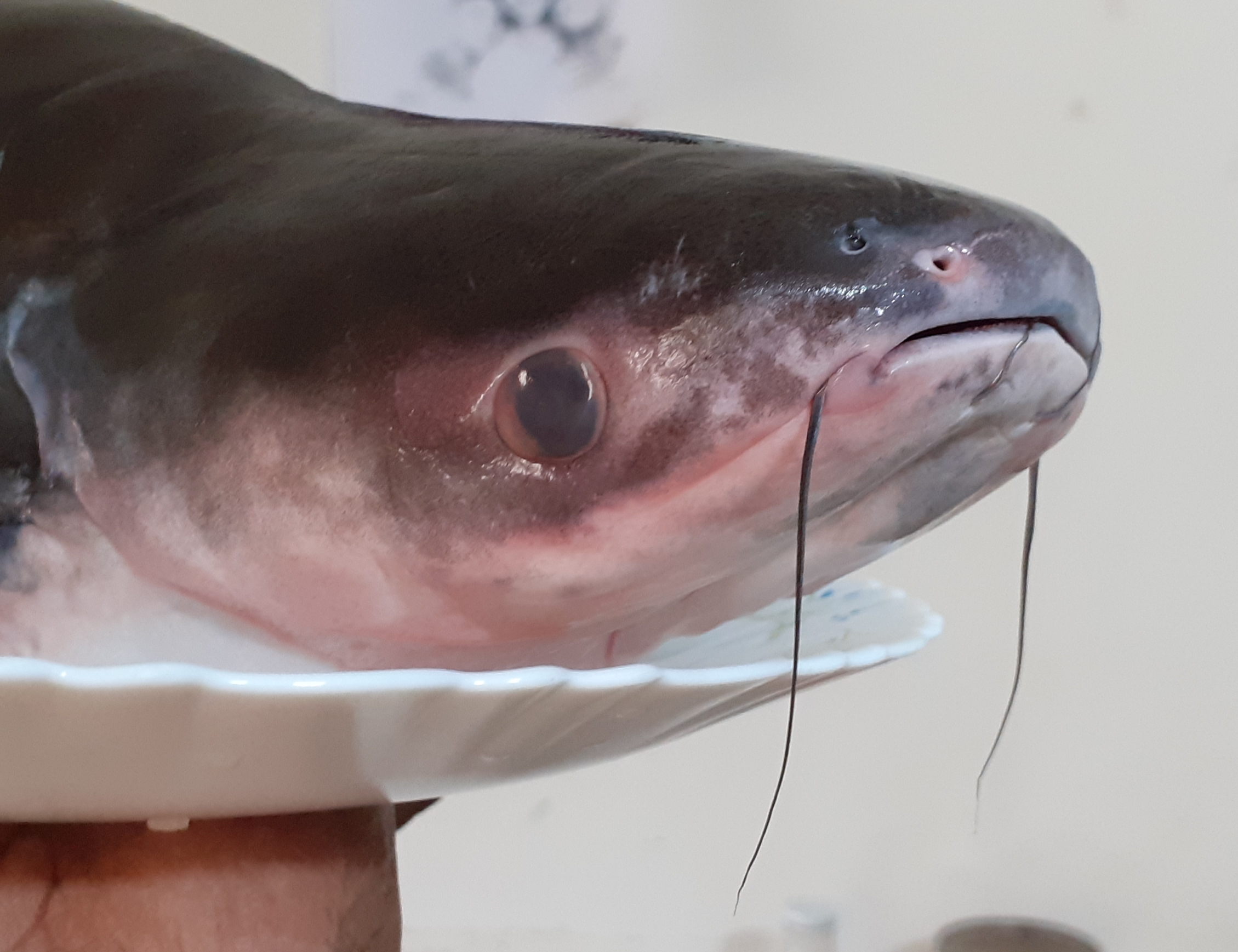
- Head of basa fish

Conservation status
- Least Concern (IUCN 3.1)

Scientific classification
- Kingdom: Animalia
- Phylum: Chordata
- Class: Actinopterygii
- Division: Teleostei
- Order: Siluriformes
- Family: Pangasiidae
- Genus: Pangasius
- Species: P. bocourti

Binomial name
- Pangasius bocourti Sauvage, 1880

= Basa (fish) =

Species of catfish

Basa (Pangasius bocourti), as it is commonly named, is a species of primarily freshwater-dwelling catfish in the shark-catfish family, Pangasiidae, native to the Mekong and Chao Phraya river basins of Mainland Southeast Asia. Economically, these fish are important as a regional food source, and are also prized on the international market. Outside Asia, such as in North America or Australia, they are often referred to as "basa fish" or "swai" or by their specific name, "bocourti". In the United Kingdom, all species of Pangasius may, legally, be described as "river cobbler", "cobbler", "basa", "pangasius" or simply "panga", as well as any of these names with the addition of "catfish". In the rest of mainland Europe, these fish are mostly sold as "pangasius" or "panga". In Asian fish markets, names for basa also include "Pacific dory" and "patin". Other, related shark-catfish species may occasionally be labeled—albeit incorrectly—as basa, including the iridescent shark (P. hypophthalmus) and the yellowtail catfish (P. pangasius).

== Description ==
The body of the basa is stout and heavy. The rounded head is broader than it is long, with the blunt snout having a white band on its muzzle. This species grows to a maximum length of 120 centimetres (47 inches).

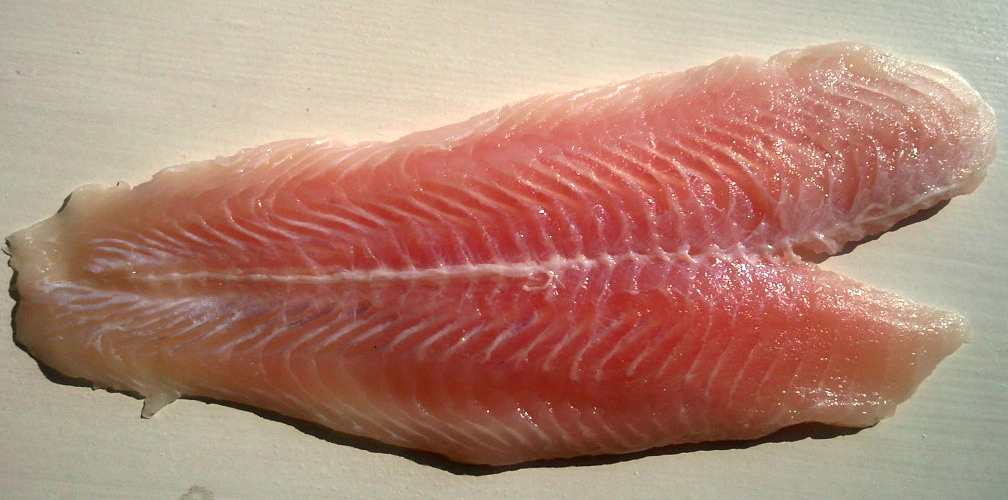
Basa fish is typically sold in cooking-ready frozen fillets

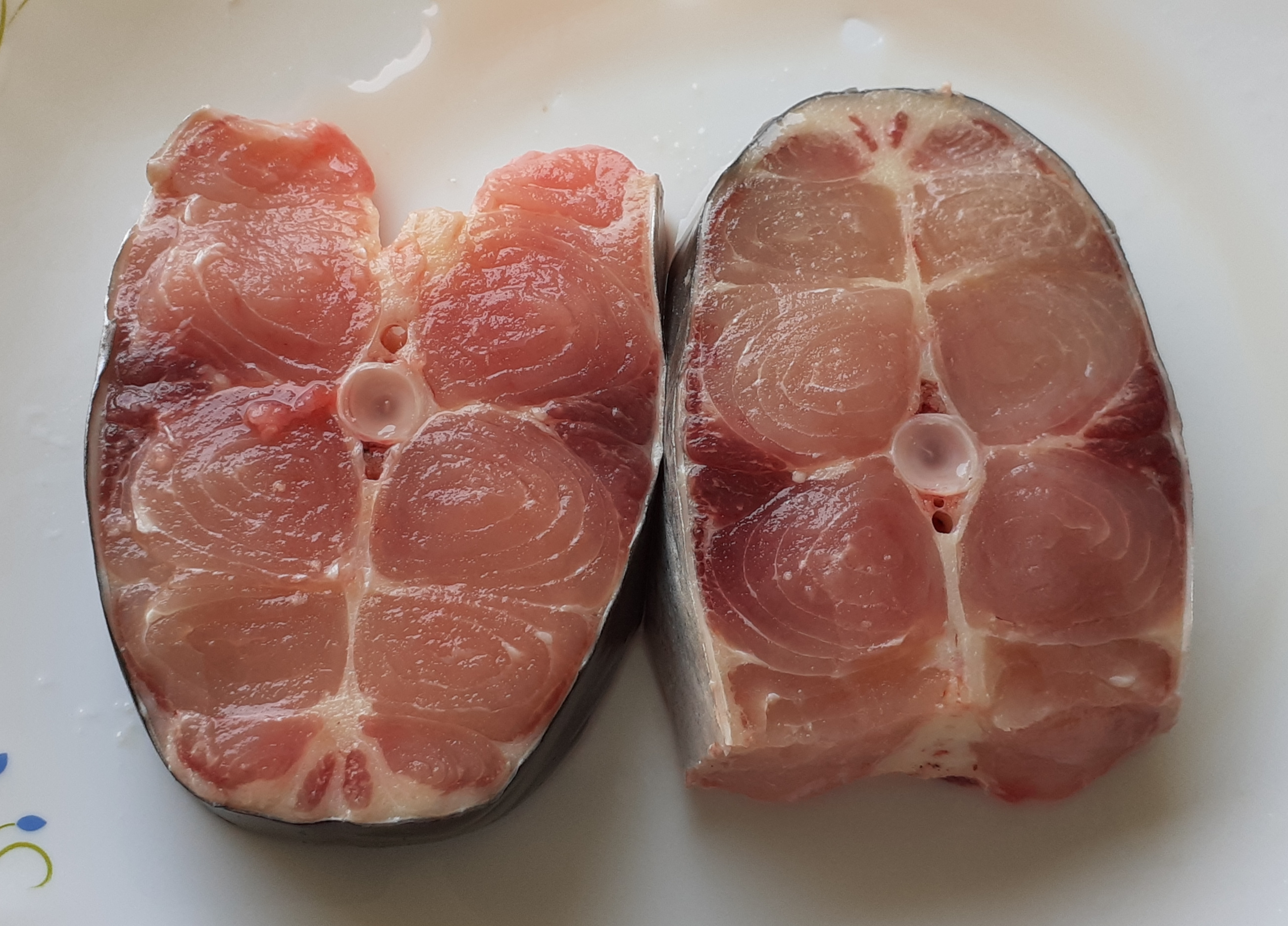
Basa fish steaks

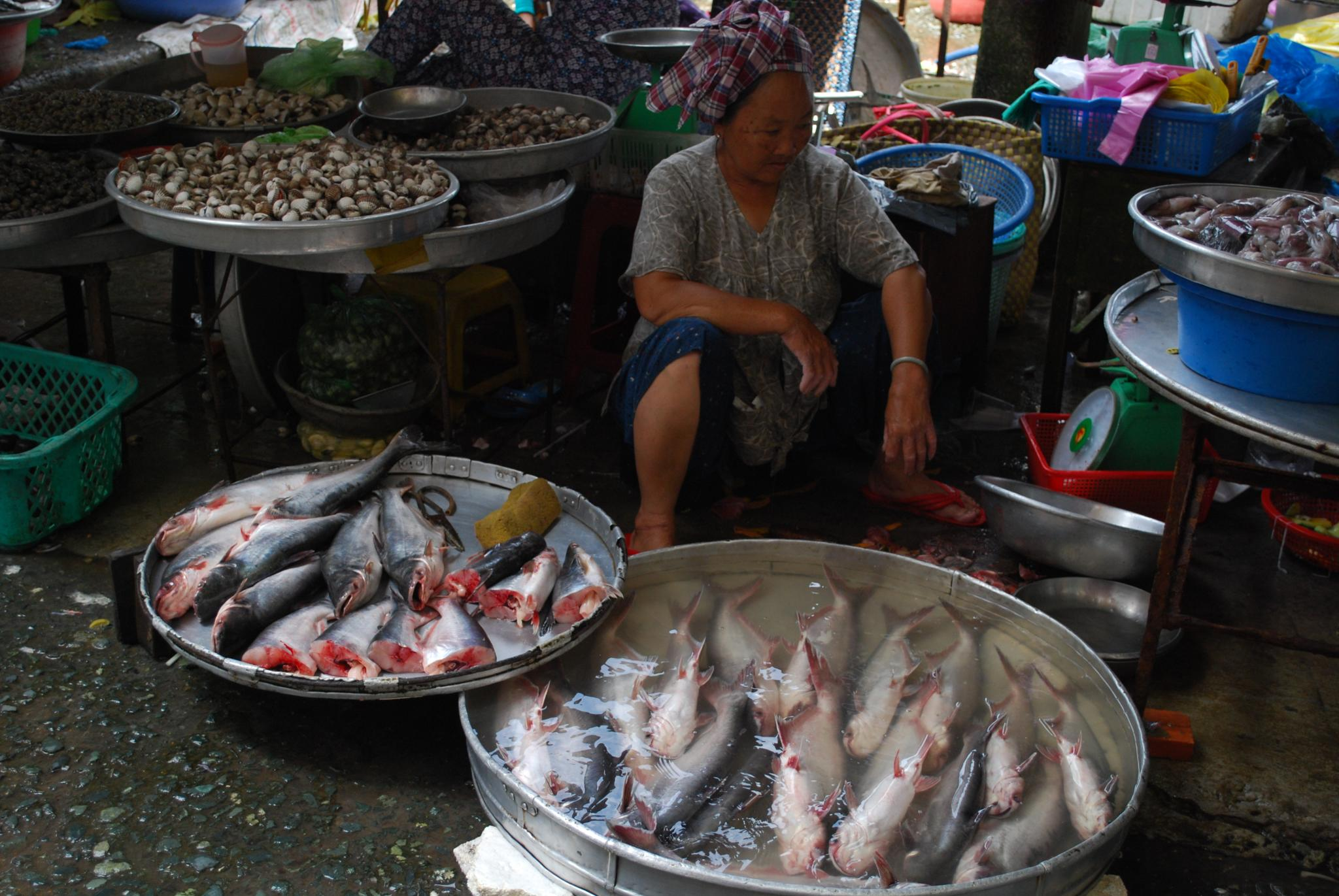
Basa fish in Vinh Long market, Vietnam

== Ecology ==
Basa fish feed on plants. They spawn at the onset of flood season and the young are first seen in June, averaging about five centimetres (two inches) by mid-June.

=== "Catfish war" in the U.S. ===
In 2002, the United States accused Vietnam of dumping catfish, namely P. bocourti and P. hypophthalmus, on the American market, arguing that the Vietnamese exporters, who are subsidised by Vietnam's government, were engaged in unfair competition. With pressure from the U.S. catfish industry, the United States Congress passed a law in 2003 preventing the imported fish from being labelled as catfish, as well as imposing additional tariffs on the imported fish. Under the U.S. Food and Drug Administration ruling, only species from the family Ictaluridae can be sold as true catfish. As a result, the Vietnamese exporters of this fish now label their products sold in the U.S. as basa fish, striped pangasius, swai or bocourti.

At the height of the "catfish war", U.S. catfish farmers and others were describing the imported catfish as an inferior product. However, Mississippi State University researchers found imported basa were preferred three-to-one to US catfish in a small (58 testers) blind taste test.

=== United Kingdom ===
Basa has become common in the UK as "Vietnamese river cobbler", "river cobbler", or "basa". It is mainly sold by large supermarkets, in both fresh and frozen forms, as a cheaper alternative to popular white fish, such as cod or haddock. Young's uses it in some of its frozen fish products, under the name basa. The import of basa is subject to the same stringent EU regulations as other food imports, as set out in the CBI pangasius product fact sheet UK Trading Standards officers said that cobbler was being fraudulently sold as cod by some fish-and-chip retailers to take advantage of the much lower price of cobbler, which was about half that of cod. This practice was highlighted by the successful prosecution of two retailers, using DNA evidence, in 2009 and 2010. Sometimes pangasius is described simply as "fish", as in "fish and chips", but retailers in the UK are required to give customers the name of the species on request.

== Environmental and health concerns ==
Several environmental organisations specialising in marine ecosystems have raised concerns surrounding basa; OceanWise, an environmental group associated with Canada's Vancouver Aquarium, has flagged farmed basa for its potential pollution of ecosystems and interference with wild species. The group stated: "Open cage farming in Southeast Asia is associated with disease transfer to wild basa. There are also concerns about feed quality, farm operating standards and the biological impact of using wild stock for culturing." The Monterey Bay Aquarium in California currently lists the species in its "red flag" or "avoid" category. Both groups cite USA-farmed catfish as a more sustainable alternative.

Testing by the Australian Quarantine and Inspection Service found trace levels of malachite green, but no other contaminants; this was likely the result of antiparasitic treatment administered to the fish, such as in the treatment of ich (white-spot disease), a common affliction of captive fishes which is often treated with malachite green (or methylene blue).

One case has been reported of a person without a general fish allergy having an anaphylactic reaction to pangasius.
