= Postage stamps and postal history of Laos =

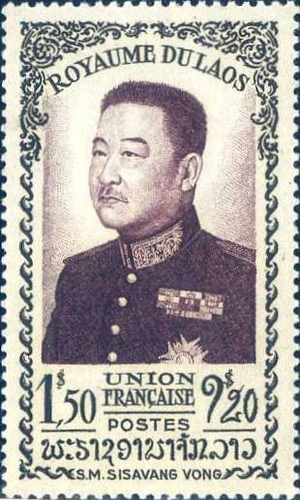
A 1951 stamp of Laos showing Sisavang Vong

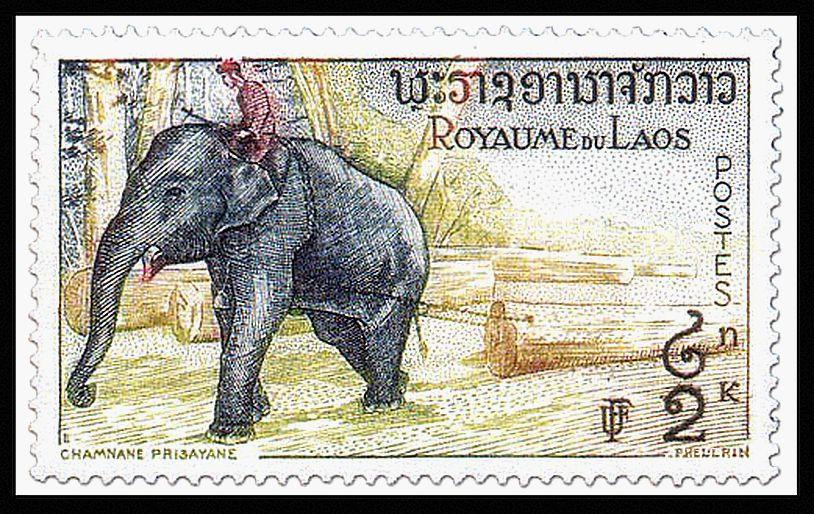
A 1958 stamp of Laos

This is a survey of the postage stamps and postal history of Laos.

Laos is a landlocked country in Southeast Asia, bordered by Burma and People's Republic of China to the northwest, Vietnam to the east, Cambodia to the south and Thailand to the west. Laos traces its history to the Kingdom of Lan Xang or Land of a Million Elephants, which existed from the 14th to the 18th century. After a period as a French protectorate, Laos gained independence in 1953. A long civil war ended officially when the Communist Pathet Lao movement came to power in 1975.

== First stamps ==
The first stamps of Laos, as an "associated state" within the French Union, were issued on 13 November 1951. Before then stamps of French Indo-China were used.

== Independence ==
Laos gained full independence as a constitutional monarchy in 1953. On 2 December 1975, Pathet Lao government renamed the country as the Lao People's Democratic Republic.

== See also ==
- Postage stamps of the French Colonies
- Postage stamps and postal history of Indochina
