= Jeera Jarernsuk =

Thai footballer (born 1985)

Personal information
- Full name: Jeera Jarernsuk
- Date of birth: 18 May 1985 (age 41)
- Place of birth: Phichit, Thailand
- Height: 1.74 m (5 ft 8 1/2 in)
- Position: Full-back

Youth career
- 2001–2004: Chonburi

Senior career*
Years	Team	Apps	(Gls)
2005–2010	Bangkok United	85	(3)
2011	Chonburi	4	(2)
2012–2013	Songkhla United	14	(0)
2013–2014	Pattaya United	13	(1)
2014–2019	Chainat Hornbill	71	(2)
Total		187	(8)

International career
2007	Thailand U23		
- * Club domestic league appearances and goals

Jeera Jarernsuk (Thai: จิระ เจริญสุข, born May 18, 1985), simply known as Art (Thai: อาร์ท), is a Thai retired professional footballer who plays as a full-back.

== Club career ==
He played for Bangkok University in the 2007 AFC Champions League group stage.

== Honours ==
=== Club ===
Bangkok University

- Thai Premier League: 2006

Chainat Hornbill

- Thai League 2: 2017

=== International ===
Thailand U-23

- Sea Games Gold Medal: 2007
