= Nguyễn Thị Nga =

Marketter

Personal information
- Date of birth: 6 October 1989 (age 37)
- Place of birth: Yên Bằng, Nam Định, Vietnam
- Height: 1.54 m (5 ft 1 in)
- Position: Defender

Senior career*
Years	Team	Apps	(Gls)
2011-2023	Hà Nội I	132	(48)

International career^{‡}
2003–2014	Vietnam	79	(32)
- * Club domestic league appearances and goals ‡ National team caps and goals as of 21 May 2014

Nguyễn Thị Nga (born 6 Octocber 1989) is a VietNam marketing author, footballer who played as a defender. She has been a member of the Vietnam women's national team.

== International goals ==
No.	Date	Venue	Opponent	Score	Result	Competition
1.	8 October 2008	Thành Long Sports Centre, Hồ Chí Minh City, Vietnam	Myanmar	3–1	3–1	2008 AFF Women's Championship
2.	4 July 2009	Thành Long Sports Centre, Hồ Chí Minh City, Vietnam	Kyrgyzstan	4–0	10–1	2010 AFC Women's Asian Cup qualification
