= 2008 AFF Women's Championship =

Tournament details
- Host country: Vietnam
- City: Ho Chi Minh City
- Dates: 8–20 October
- Teams: 9 (from 1 confederation)
- Venue: 1 (in 1 host city)

Final positions
- Champions: Australia (1st title)
- Runners-up: Vietnam
- Third place: Thailand
- Fourth place: Myanmar

Tournament statistics
- Matches played: 20
- Goals scored: 103 (5.15 per match)

The 2008 AFF Women's Championship was held from 8 to 20 October 2008, hosted by Vietnam. All games were played at the Thanh Long Sports Centre in Ho Chi Minh City. The hosts managed to get through to the final, but failed to win the title after losing 0–1 to Australia, who made their debut in the tournament since Football Australia transferred to the Asian Football Confederation (AFC) in 2006.

== Group stage ==
=== Group A ===
Team	Pld	W	D	L	GF	GA	GD	Pts
Vietnam (H)	4	4	0	0	24	1	+23	12
Myanmar	4	3	0	1	21	3	+18	9
Laos	4	2	0	2	4	14	−10	6
Indonesia	4	1	0	3	3	11	−8	3
Malaysia	4	0	0	4	1	24	−23	0

(H) Hosts
8 October 2008
15:30

Myanmar	1–3	Vietnam
Aye Nandar Hlaing 70'		Đỗ Thị Ngọc Châm 19', 64'; Nguyễn Thị Nga 87'

Thanh Long Sports Centre, Ho Chi Minh City
8 October 2008
17:45

Indonesia	0–1	Laos
		Sochitta Phonhalath 87' (pen.)

Thanh Long Sports Centre, Ho Chi Minh City

10 October 2008
15:30

Vietnam	4–0	Indonesia
Từ Thị Phụ 4'; Nguyễn Thị Minh Nguyệt 34'; Vũ Thị Huyền Linh 42'; Bùi Thị Tuyết Mai 48'

Thanh Long Sports Centre, Ho Chi Minh City
10 October 2008
18:00

Malaysia	0–7	Myanmar
		Aye Nandar Hlaing 5', 27'; My Nilar Htwe 29', 49', 73'; San San Thein 42'; Moe Moe War 75'

Thanh Long Sports Centre, Ho Chi Minh City

12 October 2008
15:30

Myanmar	7–0	Laos
Yee Yee Oo 43', 45'; Naw Ar Lo Wer Phaw 64', 67'; My Nilar Htwe 72', 83'; Than Than Htwe 89'

Thanh Long Sports Centre, Ho Chi Minh City
12 October 2008
18:00

Malaysia	0–11	Vietnam
		Đỗ Thị Ngọc Châm 13', 76'; Bùi Thị Tuyết Mai 36', 40', 70', 82'; Rozeine 38' (o.g.); Văn Thị Thanh 43'; Lê Thị Thương 58', 67'; Nguyễn Thị Minh Nguyệt 89'

Thanh Long Sports Centre, Ho Chi Minh City

14 October 2008
15:30

Laos	3–1	Malaysia
Phayvanh 17', 90'; Phonhalath 74'		Atin 82'

Thanh Long Sports Centre, Ho Chi Minh City
14 October 2008
18:00

Indonesia	0–6	Myanmar
		My Nilar Htwe 10'; Thida Oo 27'; Than Than Htwe 32'; San San Thein 41'; Aye Aye Mar 90'; Naw Ar Lo Wer Phaw 90+1'

Thanh Long Sports Centre, Ho Chi Minh City

16 October 2008
15:30

Indonesia	3–0	Malaysia
Sarce Nensi Buaim 13'; Yudith Herlina Sada 40'; Maulina Novryliani 62'

Thanh Long Sports Centre, Ho Chi Minh City
16 October 2008
18:00

Laos	0–6	Vietnam
		Lê Thị Oanh 17', 20', 50'; Đỗ Thị Ngọc Châm 30'; Lê Thị Thương 40'; Trần Thị Kim Hồng 70'

Thanh Long Sports Centre, Ho Chi Minh City

=== Group B ===
Team	Pld	W	D	L	GF	GA	GD	Pts
Australia	3	3	0	0	15	0	+15	9
Thailand	3	2	0	1	18	2	+16	6
Philippines	3	1	0	2	3	20	−17	3
Singapore	3	0	0	3	1	15	−14	0

9 October 2008
15:30

Australia	2–0	Thailand
Balomenos 71', 86'

Thanh Long Sports Centre, Ho Chi Minh City
9 October 2008
18:00

Philippines	3–1	Singapore
Reyes 3'; Latap 22'; Benitez 88'		Sun Jie 5'

Thanh Long Sports Centre, Ho Chi Minh City

11 October 2008
15:30

Singapore	0–6	Thailand
		Supaporn 11', 22'; Sunisa 50'; Nisa 67'; Sukunya 70'; Wilaiporn 90+4'

Thanh Long Sports Centre, Ho Chi Minh City
11 October 2008
18:00

Australia	7–0	Philippines
Rollason 34', 53'; Tristram 36', 81'; Sykes 65'; Balomenos 86', 90'

Thanh Long Sports Centre, Ho Chi Minh City

13 October 2008
15:30

Thailand	12–0	Philippines
Chidtawan 3'; Junpen 9', 30'; Sukunya 15', 20'; Sunisa 47'; Anootsara 55'; Pitsamai 61', 76'; Nisa 74', 88'; Wajee 79'

Thanh Long Sports Centre, Ho Chi Minh City
13 October 2008
18:00

Singapore	0–6	Australia
		Colthorpe 6', 22'; Sykes 51'; Tristram 69'; Balomenos 78'; Mastrantonio 90'

Thanh Long Sports Centre, Ho Chi Minh City

== Knockout stage ==
Semi-finals
18 October – Ho Chi Minh City
Vietnam	2
Thailand	1
18 October – Ho Chi Minh City
Australia	5
Myanmar	1

Final
20 October – Ho Chi Minh City
Vietnam	0
Australia	1
Third Place
20 October – Ho Chi Minh City
Thailand	3
Myanmar	0

=== Semi-finals ===
18 October 2008
15:00

Vietnam	2–1	Thailand
Trần Thị Kim Hồng 8' (pen.), 50' (pen.)		Nisa 52'

Thanh Long Sports Centre, Ho Chi Minh City
18 October 2008
18:00

Australia	5–1	Myanmar
Chapman 3'; Uzunlar 19'; Colthorpe 27' (pen.); Tristram 42'; Carroll 65' (pen.)		Aye Nandar Hlaing 76' (pen.)

Thanh Long Sports Centre, Ho Chi Minh City

=== Third place match ===
20 October 2008
15:00

Thailand	3–0	Myanmar
Anootsara 27', 40' (pen.); Nisa 85'

Thanh Long Sports Centre, Ho Chi Minh City

=== Final ===
20 October 2008
18:00

Vietnam	0–1	Australia
		Đào Thị Miện 79' (o.g.)

Thanh Long Sports Centre, Ho Chi Minh City

== Awards ==
2008 AFF Women's Championship champions

Australia
First title

.

== Statistics ==
There were 103 goals scored in 20 matches, for an average of 5.15 goals per match.

6 goals

- (Myanmar) My Nilar Htwe

5 goals

- (Australia) Victoria Balomenos
- (Thailand) Nisa Romyen
- (Vietnam) Bùi Thị Tuyết Mai
- (Vietnam) Đỗ Thị Ngọc Châm

4 goals

- (Australia) Jenna Tristram
- (Myanmar) Aye Nandar Hlaing

3 goals

- (Australia) Lauren Colthorpe
- (Myanmar) Than Than Htwe
- (Thailand) Annotsara Maijarern
- (Vietnam) Lê Thị Oanh
- (Vietnam) Lê Thị Thương
- (Vietnam) Trần Thị Kim Hồng

2 goals

- (Australia) Ashleigh Skyes
- (Australia) Renee Rollason
- (Laos) Sochitta Phonhalath
- (Laos) Souphavanh Phayvanh
- (Myanmar) Yee Yee Oo
- (Myanmar) Naw Ar Lo Wer Phaw
- (Myanmar) San San Thein
- (Thailand) Junpen Seesraum
- (Thailand) Sukunya Paengthem
- (Thailand) Sunisa Srangthaisong
- (Thailand) Pitsamai Sornsai
- (Vietnam) Nguyễn Thị Minh Nguyệt

1 goal

- (Australia) Ella Mastrantonio
- (Australia) Amy Chapman
- (Australia) Servet Uzunlar
- (Australia) Kim Carroll
- (Indonesia) Sanice Nensi Buaim
- (Indonesia) Yudith Herlina Sada
- (Indonesia) Maulina Novryliani
- (Malaysia) Atin Surang
- (Myanmar) Moe Moe War
- (Myanmar) Aye Aye Mar
- (Myanmar) Wer Phaw
- (Myanmar) Thida Oo
- (Philippines) Rachelle De Los Reyes
- (Philippines) Ruchelle Somogod Latap
- (Philippines) Marielle Benitez
- (Singapore) Sun Jie
- (Thailand) Wilaiporn Boothduang
- (Thailand) Chidtawan Chawong
- (Thailand) Wajee Kertsombun
- (Vietnam) Nguyễn Thị Nga
- (Vietnam) Từ Thị Phụ
- (Vietnam) Vũ Thị Huyền Linh
- (Vietnam) Văn Thị Thanh

1 own goal

- (Malaysia) Rozeinie Du Silah (against Vietnam)
- (Vietnam) Đào Thị Miện (against Australia)

== Final ranking ==
Pos	Team	Pld	W	D	L	GF	GA	GD	Pts	Final result
1	Australia	5	5	0	0	21	1	+20	15	Champions
2	Vietnam (H)	6	5	0	1	26	3	+23	15	Runners-up
3	Thailand	5	3	0	2	22	4	+18	9	Third place
4	Myanmar	6	3	0	3	22	11	+11	9	Fourth place
5	Laos	4	2	0	2	4	14	−10	6	Eliminated in group stage
6	Indonesia	4	1	0	3	3	11	−8	3	Eliminated in group stage
7	Philippines	3	1	0	2	3	20	−17	3	Eliminated in group stage
8	Singapore	3	0	0	3	1	15	−14	0	Eliminated in group stage
9	Malaysia	4	0	0	4	1	24	−23	0	Eliminated in group stage

(H) Hosts
