= 2006 AFF Women's Championship =

Tournament details
- Host country: Vietnam
- City: Ho Chi Minh City
- Dates: 29 May – 2 June
- Teams: 4 (from 1 confederation)
- Venue: 1 (in 1 host city)

Final positions
- Champions: Vietnam (1st title)
- Runners-up: Chinese Taipei
- Third place: Thailand
- Fourth place: Myanmar

Tournament statistics
- Matches played: 6
- Goals scored: 17 (2.83 per match)

The 2006 AFF Women's Championship was hosted by Vietnam and was held from 29 May to 2 June 2006. All games were played in Ho Chi Minh City. A single round robin format was used for the tournament.

Host nation Vietnam won their first title by winning all matches, while defending champions Myanmar failed to defend their tile after losing all matches.

== Results ==
Team	Pld	W	D	L	GF	GA	GD	Pts	Final result
Vietnam (H)	3	3	0	0	5	2	+3	9	Champions
Chinese Taipei	3	1	1	1	4	2	+2	4	Runners-up
Thailand	3	1	1	1	6	6	0	4	Third place
Myanmar	3	0	0	3	2	7	−5	0	Fourth place

(H) Hosts
29 May 2006

Vietnam	1–0	Chinese Taipei
Ðỗ Hải Anh	Report

Thanh Long Sports Centre, Ho Chi Minh City
29 May 2006

Thailand	3–2	Myanmar
	Report

Thanh Long Sports Centre, Ho Chi Minh City

31 May 2006

Vietnam	3–2	Thailand
	Report

Thanh Long Sports Centre, Ho Chi Minh City
31 May 2006

Myanmar	0–3	Chinese Taipei
	Report

Thanh Long Sports Centre, Ho Chi Minh City

2 June 2006

Thailand	1–1	Chinese Taipei
	Report

Thanh Long Sports Centre, Ho Chi Minh City
2 June 2006

Vietnam	1–0	Myanmar
Nguyễn Thị Hương 79'	Report

Thanh Long Sports Centre, Ho Chi Minh City

== Awards ==
2006 AFF Women's Championship champions

Vietnam
First title
