= Kitiya Thiangtham =

Thai footballer

Personal information
- Full name: Kitiya Thiangtham
- Date of birth: 30 June 1986 (age 40)
- Height: 1.62 m (5 ft 4 in)
- Position: Forward

International career^{‡}
Years	Team	Apps	(Gls)
2008	Thailand	1+	(1+)
- ‡ National team caps and goals as of 24 March 2008

Kitiya Thiangtham (Thai: กิติยาเที่ยงธรรม; born 30 June 1986) is a Thai former footballer who played as a forward. She has been a member of the Thailand women's national team.

== International career ==
Thiangtham capped for Thailand at senior level during the 2008 AFC Women's Asian Cup process.

=== International goals ===
Scores and results list Chinese Taipei's goal tally first

No.	Date	Venue	Opponent	Score	Result	Competition	Ref.
1	8 June 2003	Rajamangala Stadium, Bangkok, Thailand	Singapore	1–0	3–0	2003 AFC Women's Championship	
2	10 December 2007	Municipality of Tumbon Mueangpug Stadium, Nakhon Ratchasima, Thailand	Laos	8–0	8–0	2007 SEA Games	
3	24 March 2008	80th Birthday Stadium, Nakhon Ratchasima, Thailand	Malaysia	10–0	11–0	2008 AFC Women's Asian Cup qualification	
