= Apipoo Suntornpanavej =

Thai footballer (born 1986)

Personal information
- Full name: Apipoo Suntornpanavej
- Date of birth: 18 July 1986 (age 40)
- Place of birth: Samut Prakan, Thailand
- Height: 1.73 m (5 ft 8 in)
- Position: Attacking midfielder

Youth career
- 2005–2006: Osotspa

Senior career*
| Years | Team | Apps | (Gls) |
| 2006–2008 | Osotspa | 47 | (9) |
| 2009–2010 | PEA | 38 | (8) |
| 2010–2016 | Super Power Samut Prakan | 150 | (25) |
| 2017–2019 | PTT Rayong | 66 | (7) |
| 2021 | Ayutthaya United | 5 | (0) |
| 2022–2023 | Songkhla | 9 | (1) |
| 2023 | Kasetsart | 4 | (0) |
| 2024– | Dome | 0 | (0) |

International career^{‡}
| 2009–2010 | Thailand U23 | 7 | (2) |
| 2011–2013 | Thailand | 10 | (1) |
Medal record
Thailand U 23
Sea Games
| Gold medal – first place | Sea Games 2007 | Football |
- * Club domestic league appearances and goals as of 24 December 2023 ‡ National team caps and goals as of 27 November 2012

Apipoo Suntornpanavej (Thai: อภิภู สุนทรพนาเวศ, born 18 July 1986), simply known as Bas (Thai: บาส), is a Thai retired professional footballer who plays as an attacking midfielder.

== Club career ==
Suntornpanavej played for Osotsapa in the 2007 AFC Champions League group stages, scoring four goals.

== International career ==
He played for the Thailand national under-23 football team at the Southeast Asian Games 2007 and 2009. He also represented Thailand's full national team in 2014 World Cup qualifying, playing 35 minutes in Thailand's group-stage match against Saudi Arabia. He scored a header against Myanmar in the 2012 AFF Suzuki Cup.

== International goals ==
Scores and results list Thailand's goal tally first.

| # | Date | Venue | Opponent | Score | Result | Competition |
|---|---|---|---|---|---|---|
| 1. | 27 November 2012 | Rajamangala Stadium, Thailand | Myanmar | 2–0 | 4–0 | 2012 AFF Suzuki Cup |

== Honours ==
=== Club ===
Songkhla

- Thai League 3 Southern Region: 2022–23

=== International ===
Thailand U-23

- Sea Games Gold Medal (1): 2007
