= Võ Duy Nam =

Vietnamese footballer

Personal information
- Full name: Võ Duy Nam
- Date of birth: 28 June 1986 (age 40)
- Place of birth: Cam Ranh, Khánh Hòa, Vietnam
- Height: 1.68 m (5 ft 6 in)
- Position: Midfielder

Youth career
- 1997–2003: Khatoco Khánh Hòa

Senior career*
Years	Team	Apps	(Gls)
2004–2011	Khatoco Khánh Hòa	179	(47)
2011–2013	Hà Nội T&T	40	(3)
2014–2016	FLC Thanh Hóa	31	(0)
2016–2017	QNK Quảng Nam	10	(0)
2017–2018	Hồ Chí Minh City	3	(0)

International career
2006–2009	Vietnam U23	4	(1)
2009–2017	Vietnam	2	(0)
- * Club domestic league appearances and goals as of 25 February 2017

Võ Duy Nam (born 15 May 1986 or 28 June 1986) is a Vietnamese footballer. He plays for Hồ Chí Minh City which is playing in V-League.

He was called to Vietnam national under-23 football team to attend 2007 SEA Games.

Then, was called to Vietnam national football team at the friendly matches against China PR, Hong Kong and Mozambique.
