= Kim Carroll (soccer) =

Australian soccer player (born 1987)

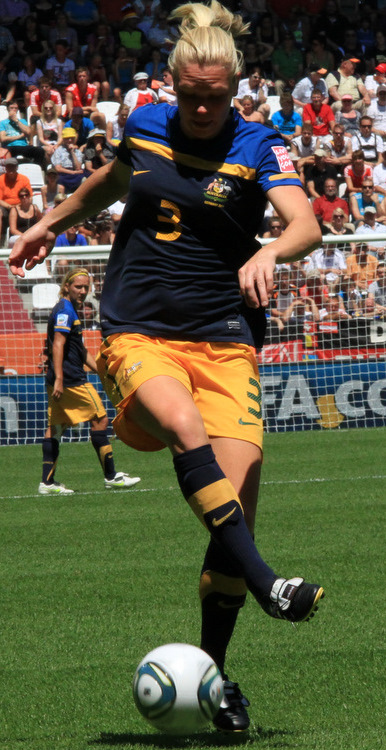
- Carroll playing for Australia in 2011

Personal information
- Full name: Kim Marie Carroll
- Date of birth: 2 September 1987 (age 39)
- Place of birth: Tully, Queensland, Australia
- Height: 1.75 m (5 ft 9 in)
- Position: Defender

Youth career
- 2003–2008: Queensland Sting

Senior career*
Years	Team	Apps	(Gls)
2003–2008	Queensland Sting	7	(0)
2008–2011	Brisbane Roar	52	(2)
2011–2012	Fortuna Hjørring		
2012–2015	Brisbane Roar	52	(2)
2015–2020	Perth Glory	63	(1)
2020–2021	Brisbane Roar	52	(2)
2021–2023	Perth Glory	31	(0)

International career^{‡}
2004–2006	Australia U-20	16	(1)
2005–2023	Australia	54	(2)
- * Club domestic league appearances and goals as of 12 June 2023 ‡ National team caps and goals as of 7 July 2015

Kim Marie Carroll (born 2 September 1987) is a retired Australian soccer player who played in the A-League Women for Perth Glory and for Brisbane Roar, as well as playing for Fortuna Hjørring in the Danish Women's League. She has also played over 50 matches for Australia.

== Early life ==
Carroll was born and raised in Tully, Queensland. In 2013, the Cassowary Coast Regional Council named a sporting complex in Tully the "Kim Carroll Sporting Fields" in her honour. She left home at the age of 15 to take up a scholarship with the Queensland Academy of Sport (QAS).

== Playing career ==
=== Club career ===
Carroll played seven times for the Queensland Sting in the Women's National Soccer League (WNSL) during the 2003–04 and 2004 WNSL seasons. She also played for the Sting's grand final-winning team in the 2005 Australian National Women's Football Tournament.

Between 2008 and 2011 Carroll played for Brisbane Roar in the W-League.

In 2011 Carroll joined Fortuna Hjørring in the Danish Elitedivisionen, with whom she played in the UEFA Women's Champions League.

After returning from Denmark, Carroll re-joined Brisbane Roar in 2012. In the W-League off-season in 2013, Carroll spent time playing for Macarthur Rams in the National Premier Leagues NSW Women’s competition.

In August 2015, Carroll moved to the Perth Glory.

In November 2020, Carroll returned to Queensland, joining Brisbane Roar once again.

In June 2021, Carroll returned once more to Perth Glory.

In March 2023, Carroll announced her retirement at the end of the 2022–23 A-League Women season.

=== International career ===
She has been a member of the Australian national team since 2005, winning the 2010 Asian Cup and taking part in the 2011 World Cup.

== Career statistics ==
=== International goals ===
Scores and results list Australia's goal tally first.

#	Date	Venue	Opponent	Score	Result	Competition
1	18 October 2008	Thanh Long Sports Centre, Ho Chi Minh City, Vietnam	Myanmar	5–0	5–1	2008 AFF Women's Championship
2	21 May 2010	Chengdu Sports Centre, Chengdu, China	South Korea	1–0	3–1	2010 AFC Women's Asian Cup

== Honours ==
=== Club ===
Queensland Sting

- Women's National Soccer League Championship: 2004
- Australian National Women's Football Tournament Championship: 2005

Brisbane Roar

- W-League Premiership: 2008–09
- W-League Championship: 2008–09, 2010–11

=== Country ===
Australia

- AFC Women's Asian Cup: 2010
- AFF Women's Championship: 2008
- OFC U-20 Women's Championship: 2004
