= Vietnam women's national football team =

Vietnam
- Nickname(s): Những Nữ Chiến Binh Sao Vàng (Golden Star Women Warriors)
- Association: Vietnam Football Federation (VFF)
- Confederation: AFC (Asia)
- Sub-confederation: AFF (Southeast Asia)
- Head coach: Hoàng Văn Phúc
- Captain: Huỳnh Như
- Most caps: Nguyễn Thị Tuyết Dung (131)
- Top scorer: Huỳnh Như (70)
- Home stadium: Various
- FIFA code: VIE
First colours	Second colours

FIFA ranking
- Current: 37 (20 October 2026)
- Highest: 28 (June 2013 – March 2014)
- Lowest: 43 (July – October 2003; August 2004 – March 2005; September 2005)

First international
- Vietnam 0–1 Malaysia (Hanoi, Vietnam; 11 May 1997)

Biggest win
- Maldives 0–16 Vietnam (Dushanbe, Tajikistan; 23 September 2021)

Biggest defeat
- North Korea 12–1 Vietnam (Iloilo City, Philippines; 9 November 1999); Australia 11–0 Vietnam (Sydney, Australia; 21 May 2015)

World Cup
- Appearances: 1 (first in 2023)
- Best result: Group stage (2023)

Asian Cup
- Appearances: 10 (first in 1999)
- Best result: 6th place (2014); Quarter-final (6th placed) (2022)

Asian Games
- Appearances: 7 (first in 1998)
- Best result: Fourth Place (2014)

ASEAN Championship
- Appearances: 13 (first in 2004)
- Best result: Champions (2006, 2012, 2019)
Medal record
AFF Cup
Gold medal – first place	2006 Vietnam
Gold medal – first place	2012 Vietnam
Gold medal – first place	2019 Thailand
Silver medal – second place	2004 Vietnam
Silver medal – second place	2008 Vietnam
Silver medal – second place	2016 Myanmar	Team
Bronze medal – third place	2004 Vietnam
Bronze medal – third place	2007 Myanmar
Bronze medal – third place	2011 Laos
Bronze medal – third place	2013 Myanmar
Bronze medal – third place	2018 Indonesia	Team
- Website: vff.org.vn

The Vietnam women's national football team (Vietnamese: Đội tuyển bóng đá nữ quốc gia Việt Nam) is a women's senior football team representing Vietnam and controlled by Vietnam Football Federation (VFF). The team's nickname is the Golden Star Women Warriors (Những Nữ Chiến Binh Sao Vàng).

== History ==
=== Early history and an established Southeast Asian powerhouse ===
Vietnam women's football was established in 1990, but it was not until 1997 that the women's team had their first match. The team has become one of the most powerful football women's team in Southeast Asia since 2001 along with Thailand. Vietnam cemented its position in the region by winning gold medals at the AFF Women's Championship in 2006, 2012 and 2019. Also, in the SEA Games women's level, Vietnam also cemented its position, winning gold in 2001, 2003, 2005, 2009, 2017, 2019, 2021, and 2023 editions. Two of these occurred when they and the men's U23 team won gold medals of the SEA Games.

In spite of being a major powerhouse in Southeast Asian women's football, Vietnam has fallen short in continental tournaments like the AFC Women's Asian Cup and Asian Games. Vietnam first qualified for the Women's Asian Cup in 1999 and has since maintained the qualifying streak, and has hosted the competitions twice, first in 2008 and second in 2014, but Vietnam failed to progress from the group stage each time. To make matters worse, Vietnam even missed out on the 2015 FIFA Women's World Cup in a painful playoff defeat at home to arch-rival Thailand 1–2.

At the Asian Games, Vietnam first participated in the 1998 Asian Games in Thailand, and for the first four editions, Vietnam had little to impress, and Vietnam's first win only came in the 2010 Asian Games. Vietnam made a major breakthrough at the 2014 Asian Games, finishing fourth place for the first time. Vietnam again progressed from the group stage in the 2018 Asian Games, but failed to Chinese Taipei after a penalty shootout.

=== First Women's World Cup and Group Stage Exit ===
In the pre-2022 AFC Women's Asian Cup friendlies in Spain, preparations had been plagued by the COVID-19 pandemic as several players were found to be infected with the virus. However, the Vietnamese side was able to have enough players for the group stage, where they lost to two Asian powerhouses South Korea and Japan both by 0–3. The Vietnamese team finally reached the quarter-finals of a Women's Asian Cup for the first time after a struggling 2–2 draw with Myanmar, which also effectively knocked the Burmese out of the tournament. In Vietnam's first knockout phase experience, Vietnam lost to China in the quarterfinals, then entered the playoff phase against old foes Thailand and Chinese Taipei. This time, with Thailand and Chinese Taipei, plagued by a coronavirus, Vietnam was able to win the playoff round, thus qualified for the 2023 FIFA Women's World Cup, their first World Cup in history.

The successful participation of Vietnam women's team has been notable after a string of football reforms initiated since the late 2010s to promote women's football at a universal level such as schools, universities, and companies after the failure to qualify for the 2015 Women's World Cup, though challenges have persisted due to cultural issues and the lack of a professional domestic league in the country. To further improve Vietnam women's football standards, an attempt to create an independent development fund for women's football has been underlined, while calls to professionalize the domestic league have also been taken for the first time.

Their first match against defending champions United States in the 2023 FIFA Women's World Cup ended 3–0, followed by their second, 2–0 defeat against fellow debutants Portugal, ending their Round of 16 dreams. The team was again out-matched 7–0 by the Netherlands in their final game of the tournament. The Vietnamese women's team finished dead last in their debut appearance of the Women's World Cup, but brought some impressions of the spirit of not giving up in their first world stage tournament.

== Team image ==
=== Nicknames ===
The team's nickname is the Golden Star Women Warriors (Vietnamese: Những Nữ Chiến Binh Sao Vàng), similar to the nickname Những Chiến Binh Sao Vàng (Golden Star Warriors) from the men's team.

=== Home stadium ===
Vietnam plays their home matches on the Mỹ Đình National Stadium, Thống Nhất Stadium or Cẩm Phả Stadium.

=== Kit suppliers ===
Kit supplier	Period	Notes
(Germany) Adidas	1996–2005	
(China) Li-Ning	2006–2008	
(United States) Nike	2009–2013	
(Thailand) Grand Sport	2014–2023	
(Japan) Jogarbola	2024–2026	

=== Sponsorship ===
Primary sponsors include: Honda, Yanmar, Grand Sport, Sony, Bia Saigon, Acecook, Coca-Cola, Vinamilk, Kao Vietnam, Herbalife Nutrition, TNI Corporation and FPT Play.

=== Rivalries ===
==== Thailand ====
Vietnam has a strong rivalry with Thailand as both teams have historically been among the strongest sides in the region and have frequently competed for major regional titles, particularly at the Southeast Asian Games and the ASEAN Women's Championship. In 38 meetings between the two teams, Vietnam has won 20 matches, Thailand 9, while 9 have ended in draws.

== FIFA World Ranking ==
As of 11 December 2025

Vietnam's FIFA World Ranking History
Year	2003	2004	2005	2006	2007	2008	2009	2010	2011	2012	2013	2014	2015	2016	2017	2018	2019	2020	2021	2022	2023	2024	2025
FIFA World Ranking	42	43	36	36	36	30	32	34	31	30	28	34	29	32	32	35	32	35	32	34	33	37	36
AFC Ranking	8	8	7	7	8	6	6	7	7	7	6	7	6	7	7	6	7	6	5	6	5	6	6

== Results and fixtures ==
The following is a list of match results in the last 12 months, as well as any future matches that have been scheduled.

Legend

Win Draw Loss Fixture

=== 2025 ===
5 December 2025 SEA Games GS	Vietnam	7–0	Malaysia	Chonburi, Thailand
18:30 UTC+7	Phạm Hải Yến 4', 26'; Nguyễn Thị Bích Thùy 23'; Trần Thị Hải Linh 36'; Thái Thị Thảo 48', 59', 78'	Report		Stadium: Chonburi Stadium; Referee: Rawdha Almansoori (United Arab Emirates)

8 December 2025 SEA Games GS	Philippines	1–0	Vietnam	Chonburi, Thailand
18:30 UTC+7	Ramirez 90+4'	Report		Stadium: Chonburi Stadium; Referee: Gulshoda Saidqulova (Uzbekistan)

11 December 2025 SEA Games GS	Vietnam	2–0	Myanmar	Chonburi, Thailand
16:00 UTC+7	Ngân Thị Vạn Sự 8'; Nguyễn Thị Bích Thùy 14'	Report		Stadium: Chonburi Stadium; Referee: Esraa Almbaidin (Jordan)

14 December 2025 SEA Games SF	Vietnam	5–0	Indonesia	Chonburi, Thailand
16:00 UTC+7	Nguyễn Thị Bích Thùy 28' (pen.), 80'; Phạm Hải Yến 49', 58'; Huỳnh Như 86'	Report		Stadium: IPE Chonburi Stadium; Referee: Alesar Baddour (Syria)

17 December 2025 SEA Games Gold Medal Match	Philippines	0–0 (a.e.t.) (6–5 p)	Vietnam	Chonburi, Thailand
19:30 UTC+7		Report		Stadium: Chonburi Stadium; Referee: Rebecca Durcau (Australia)
	Penalties
	Jael-Marie (penalty scored); Pino (penalty scored); Hali (penalty scored); Angela (penalty scored); Markey (penalty scored); Sawicki (penalty scored)		(penalty scored) Huỳnh Như; (penalty scored) Ngọc Minh Chuyên; (penalty scored) Nguyễn Thị Trúc Hương; (penalty scored) Hoàng Thị Loan; (penalty scored) Cù Thị Huỳnh Như; (penalty missed) Trần Thị Thu

=== 2026 ===
27 January Friendly	Vietnam	1–0	Uzbekistan	Hanoi, Vietnam
16:00 UTC+7	Nguyễn Thị Bích Thùy 59'	Report

30 January Friendly	Vietnam	2–6	Uzbekistan	Hanoi, Vietnam
15:30 UTC+7		Report

10 February Unofficial friendly	China	2–0	Vietnam	Shenzhen, China
19:00 UTC+8	Wurigumula 30', 46'	Report		Stadium: Shenzhen Youth Football Training Base Centre Stadium

13 February Unofficial friendly	China	6–1	Vietnam	Shenzhen, China
19:00 UTC+8	Wang Linlin 8'; Wurigumula 49'; Jin Kun 52'; Zhang Xin 62'; Shao Ziqin 72'; Lu Yatong 82'	Report	Nguyễn Thị Thanh Nhã 66'	Stadium: Shenzhen Youth Football Training Base Centre Stadium

4 March Asian Cup group stage	Vietnam	2–1	India	Perth, Australia
19:00 UTC+8	Ngân Thị Vạn Sự 30', 90+4'	Report (AFC); Report (FIFA)	Sanfida 52'	Stadium: HBF Park; Attendance: 1,961; Referee: Kim Yu-jeong (South Korea)

7 March Asian Cup group stage	Chinese Taipei	1–0	Vietnam	Perth, Australia
13:00 UTC+8	Su Yu-hsuan 26'	Report (AFC); Report (FIFA)		Stadium: HBF Park; Attendance: 1,784; Referee: Lara Lee (Australia)

10 March Asian Cup group stage	Japan	4–0	Vietnam	Perth, Australia
17:00 UTC+8	Ueki 21'; Hamano 51'; Fujino 64'; Seike 67'	Report (AFC); Report (FIFA)		Stadium: HBF Park; Attendance: 3,648; Referee: Kim Yu-jeong (South Korea)

5 September Hybrid friendly	Jiangsu Wuxi (China)	0–1	Vietnam	Suzhou, China
--:-- UTC+9		Report	Phạm Hải Yến 14'

9 September Unofficial Friendly	China	3–0	Vietnam	Suzhou, China
--:-- UTC+8		Report

14 September 2026 Asian Games GS	Chinese Taipei	2–1	Vietnam	Fukuroi, Japan
16:00 UTC+9	Su Yu-hsuan 16'; Wakabayashi 81'	Report	Nguyễn Thị Thanh Nhã 86'	Stadium: Shizuoka Stadium; Attendance: 352; Referee: Park Se-jin (South Korea)

17 September 2026 Asian Games GS	Vietnam	0–8	Japan	Fukuroi, Japan
19:30 UTC+9		Report	Kamiya 12', 52'; Shiokoshi 19'; Cù Thị Huỳnh Như 43' (o.g.); Hamada 45+3'; Nishio 78'; Narumiya 81'; Yumura 90+2'	Stadium: Shizuoka Stadium; Attendance: 1,029; Referee: Esraa Al-Mbaiden (Jordan)

21 September 2026 Asian Games GS	Vietnam	0–0	Thailand	Osaka, Japan
19:30 UTC+9		Report		Stadium: Nagai Stadium; Referee: Veronika Bernatskaia (Kyrgyzstan)

25 September 2026 Asian Games QF	China	1–0 (a.e.t.)	Vietnam	Osaka, Japan
15:00 UTC+9	Wang Shuang 109'	Report		Stadium: Nagai Stadium; Attendance: 252; Referee: Azusa Sugino (Japan)

- Vietnam Fixtures and Results – Soccerway.com

== Coaching staff ==
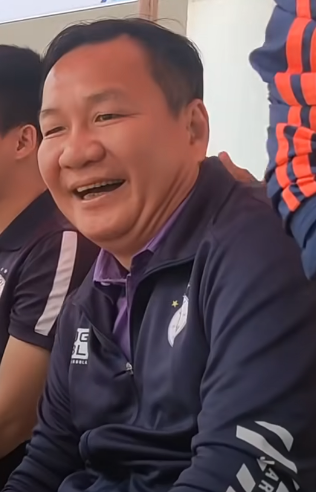
Hoàng Văn Phúc, the current head coach of Vietnam women's team.

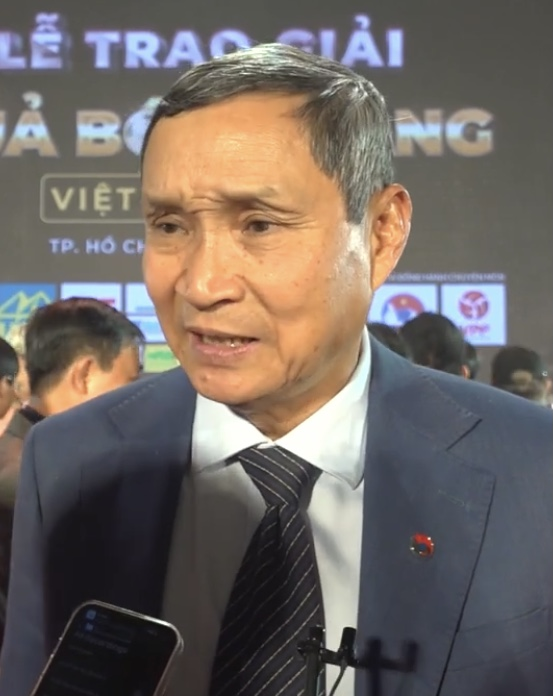
Mai Đức Chung, considered "the best coach in the history of Vietnamese women's football".

As of 16 April 2026

Position	Name
Head coach	Hoàng Văn Phúc
Technical director	Takeshi Koshida
Assistant coach	Đoàn Minh Hải; Đoàn Thị Kim Chi; Nguyễn Thị Ngọc Anh
Goalkeeping coach	Nguyễn Thị Kim Hồng
Fitness coach	(France) Cédric Roger
Team doctor	Trần Anh Tuấn

=== Manager history ===
Name	Period	Achievements
(Vietnam) Trần Thanh Ngữ	1997	1997 Southeast Asian Games: Bronze
(Vietnam) Mai Đức Chung (interim)	1997	
(China) Jia Guangta	1998	
(Germany) Rainer Willfeld (interim)	2000–2001	
(England) Steve Darby	2001	2001 Southeast Asian Games: Gold
(Vietnam) Nguyễn Kim Thành (interim)	2001	
(China) Jia Guangta	2002	
(Germany) Rainer Willfeld (interim)	2003	
(Vietnam) Mai Đức Chung	2003–2005	2003 Southeast Asian Games: (gold) Gold; 2004 AFF Women's Championship: (silver) Runner-up
(Vietnam) Trần Ngọc Thái Tuấn	2005	
(Vietnam) Mai Đức Chung	2005	2005 Southeast Asian Games: (gold) Gold
(Vietnam) Trần Ngọc Thái Tuấn	2005–2007	2006 AFF Women's Championship: Champions
(Vietnam) Ngô Lê Bằng	2007	
(China) Chen Yunfa	2007–2009	2007 AFF Women's Championship: (bronze) Third Place; 2007 Southeast Asian Games: Silver; 2008 AFF Women's Championship: (silver) Runner-up; 2009 Southeast Asian Games: Gold
(Vietnam) Vũ Bá Đông (interim)	2010	
(China) Chen Yunfa	2010–2014	2011 AFF Women's Championship: (bronze) Third Place; 2012 AFF Women's Championship: Champions; 2013 AFF Women's Championship: (bronze) Third Place; 2013 Southeast Asian Games: Silver
(Vietnam) Mai Đức Chung (interim)	2014	2014 Asian Games: Fourth Place
(Japan) Takashi Norimatsu	2015	2015 AFF Women's Championship: Fourth Place
(Vietnam) Mai Đức Chung	2016–2026	2016 AFF Women's Championship: (silver) Runner-up; 2017 Southeast Asian Games: (gold) Gold; 2018 AFF Women's Championship: (bronze) Third Place; 2019 AFF Women's Championship: Champions; 2019 Southeast Asian Games: (gold) Gold; 2020 Olympics Qualifiers: Play-off stage 2022 AFC Women's Asian Cup: Quarter-finalists and qualified for the 2023 FIFA Women's World Cup; 2021 Southeast Asian Games: (gold) Gold; 2022 AFF Women's Championship: Fourth Place; 2023 Southeast Asian Games: (gold) Gold; 2023 FIFA Women's World Cup: Group stage 2025 ASEAN Women's Championship: (bronze) Third Place; 2025 Southeast Asian Games: Silver
(Vietnam) Hoàng Văn Phúc	2026–	

== Players ==
=== Current squad ===
The following 23 players were called up for the 2026 Asian Games.

Caps and goals correct as of 25 September 2026, after the match against China.

No.	Pos.	Player	Date of birth (age)	Caps	Goals	Club
1	GK	Lê Thị Thu	1 August 2007 (age 19)	0	0	(Vietnam Football Federation) Phong Phu Ha Nam
14	GK	Trần Thị Kim Thanh	18 September 1993 (age 33)	72	0	(Vietnam Football Federation) Ho Chi Minh City
20	GK	Khổng Thị Hằng	10 October 1993 (age 33)	36	0	(Vietnam Football Federation) Thai Nguyen T&T
2	DF	Lương Thị Thu Thương	1 May 2000 (age 26)	46	0	(Vietnam Football Federation) Than KSVN
4	DF	Ngô Thị Hồng Nhung	5 September 2000 (age 26)	1	0	(Vietnam Football Federation) Ho Chi Minh City
5	DF	Hoàng Thị Loan	6 February 1995 (age 31)	46	3	(Vietnam Football Federation) Hanoi
6	DF	Nguyễn Thị Hoa	28 November 2000 (age 25)	13	0	(Vietnam Football Federation) Hanoi
13	DF	Lê Thị Diễm My	6 March 1994 (age 32)	42	0	(Vietnam Football Federation) Than KSVN
18	DF	Cù Thị Huỳnh Như	7 August 2000 (age 26)	10	0	(Vietnam Football Federation) Ho Chi Minh City
19	DF	Nguyễn Thị Thanh Nhã	25 September 2001 (age 25)	51	8	(Vietnam Football Federation) Hanoi
25	DF	Nguyễn Thị Tuyết Ngân	10 February 2000 (age 26)	10	1	(Vietnam Football Federation) Ho Chi Minh City
26	DF	Trần Thị Thu Phương	1 February 2002 (age 24)	1	0	(Vietnam Football Federation) Than KSVN
8	MF	Nguyễn Thị Trúc Hương	4 March 2000 (age 26)	22	1	(Vietnam Football Federation) Than KSVN
11	MF	Thái Thị Thảo	12 February 1995 (age 31)	71	18	(Vietnam Football Federation) Hanoi
15	MF	Vũ Thị Hoa	6 November 2003 (age 23)	12	0	(Vietnam Football Federation) Hanoi
16	MF	Dương Thị Vân	20 September 1994 (age 32)	64	3	(Vietnam Football Federation) Thai Nguyen T&T
17	MF	Trần Thị Thu Xuân	21 December 2002 (age 23)	5	0	(Vietnam Football Federation) Ho Chi Minh City
21	MF	Ngân Thị Vạn Sự	29 April 2001 (age 25)	56	14	(Vietnam Football Federation) Hanoi
23	MF	Nguyễn Thị Bích Thùy	1 May 1994 (age 32)	94	25	(Vietnam Football Federation) Thai Nguyen T&T
7	FW	Ngọc Minh Chuyên	23 June 2004 (age 22)	14	1	(Vietnam Football Federation) Thai Nguyen T&T
10	FW	Lưu Hoàng Vân	9 April 2006 (age 20)	1	0	(Vietnam Football Federation) Phong Phu Ha Nam
12	FW	Phạm Hải Yến (captain)	9 November 1994 (age 32)	104	57	(Vietnam Football Federation) Hanoi
24	FW	Nguyễn Thị Thúy Hằng	19 November 1997 (age 29)	24	6	(Vietnam Football Federation) Thai Nguyen T&T

=== Recent call-ups ===
The following players have also been called up to the squad within the past 12 months.

Pos.	Player	Date of birth (age)	Caps	Goals	Club	Latest call-up
GK	Đoàn Thị Ngọc Phượng	1 February 1998 (age 28)	0	0	(Vietnam) Ho Chi Minh City	2026 Asian Games ^{PRE}
DF	Trần Thị Thu	15 January 1991 (age 35)	39	2	(Vietnam) Thai Nguyen T&T	2026 Asian Games ^{PRE}
DF	Lê Thị Bảo Trâm	2 March 2004 (age 22)	0	0	(Vietnam) Than KSVN	2026 Asian Games ^{PRE}
DF	Trần Thị Duyên	28 December 2000 (age 25)	21	1	(Vietnam) Phong Phu Ha Nam	2026 Asian Games ^{INJ}
DF	Trần Thị Thu Thảo	15 January 1993 (age 33)	59	5	(Vietnam) Ho Chi Minh City	2026 AFC Women's Asian Cup
DF	Trần Thị Hải Linh	8 June 2001 (age 25)	40	2	(Vietnam) Hanoi	2026 AFC Women's Asian Cup
DF	Nguyễn Thị Mỹ Anh	27 November 1994 (age 31)	34	1	(Vietnam) Thai Nguyen T&T	2026 AFC Women's Asian Cup
DF	Hồ Thị Thanh Thảo	17 May 2004 (age 22)	0	0	(Vietnam) Than KSVN	2026 AFC Women's Asian Cup ^{PRE}
DF	Nguyễn Thị Kim Yên	26 June 2002 (age 24)	2	0	(Vietnam) Ho Chi Minh City	2026 AFC Women's Asian Cup ^{PRE}
MF	Trần Nhật Lan	1 January 2004 (age 22)	0	0	(Vietnam) Than KSVN	2026 Asian Games ^{PRE}
MF	Vũ Thị Hoa	16 November 2005 (age 21)	0	0	(Vietnam) Phong Phu Ha Nam	2026 Asian Games ^{PRE}
MF	Ngân Thị Thanh Hiếu	13 February 2007 (age 19)	0	0	(Vietnam) Phong Phu Ha Nam	2026 Asian Games ^{PRE}
MF	Nguyễn Thị Hải Yến	9 February 2005 (age 21)	0	0	(Vietnam) Than KSVN	2026 AFC Women's Asian Cup ^{PRE}
FW	Huỳnh Như	28 November 1991 (age 34)	124	70	(Vietnam) Ho Chi Minh City	2026 AFC Women's Asian Cup
^{INJ} = Withdrew due to injury; ^{PRE} = Preliminary squad / standby; ^{RET} = Retired from the national team; ^{WD} = Withdrew due to non-injury issue

== Records ==
As of 25 September 2026

Players in bold are still active with the national team.

=== Most capped players ===
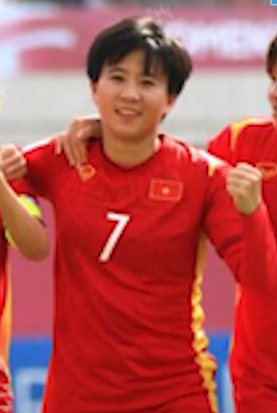
Nguyễn Thị Tuyết Dung is the current most capped for Vietnam women's team

#	Player	Career	Caps	Goals
1	Nguyễn Thị Tuyết Dung	2011–2025	131	53
2	**Huỳnh Như**	2011–present	124	70
3	Đặng Thị Kiều Trinh	2004–2018	118	0
4	Đoàn Thị Kim Chi	1998–2010	109	29
5	**Phạm Hải Yến**	2011–present	104	57
6	**Chương Thị Kiều**	2011–present	98	6
7	**Nguyễn Thị Bích Thùy**	2015–present	94	25
8	Nguyễn Thị Minh Nguyệt	2004–2016	93	40
9	Đỗ Thị Ngọc Châm	2002–2014	86	49
10	Nguyễn Thị Xuyến	2007–2019	85	5

=== Top goalscorers ===
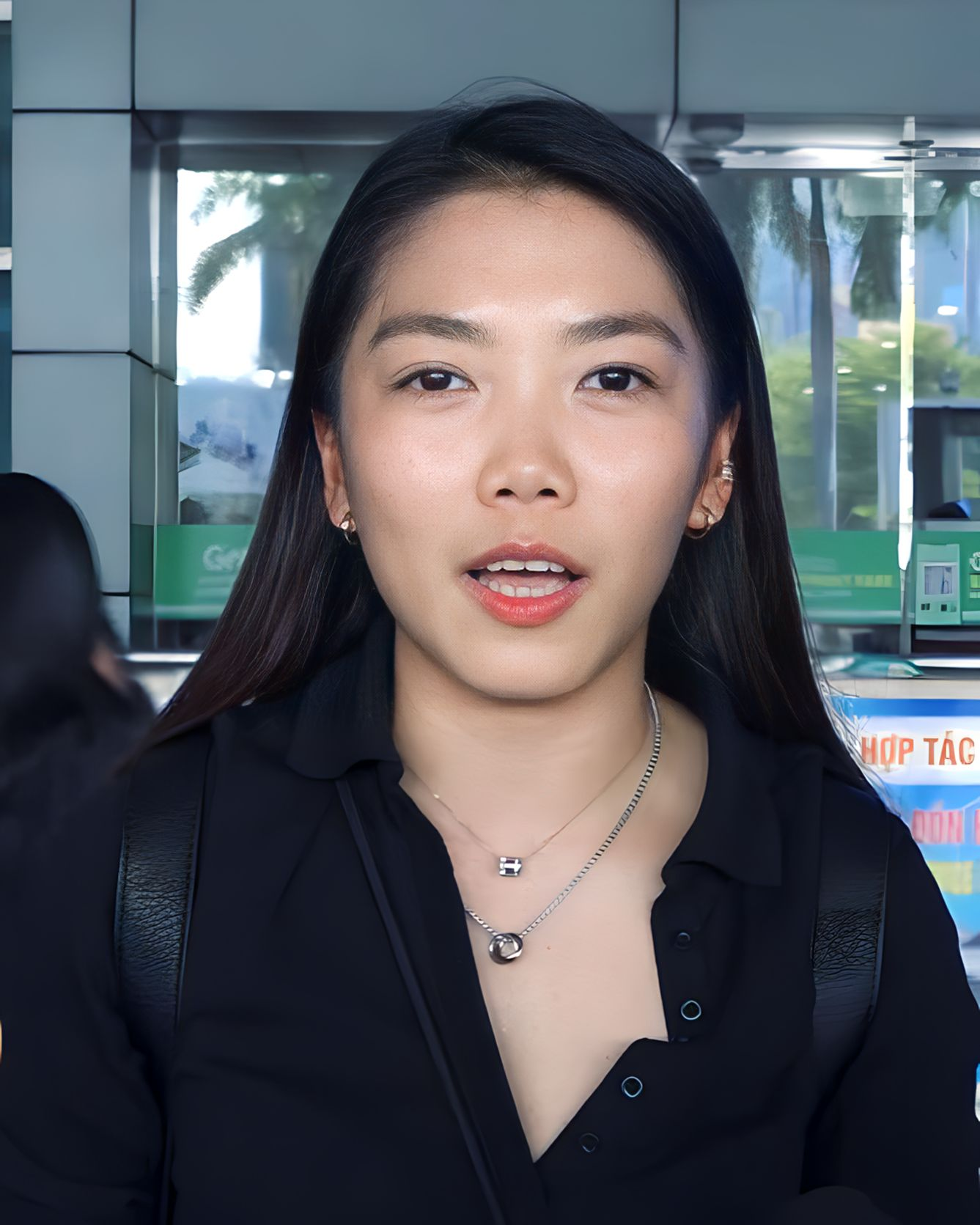
Huỳnh Như is current top scorer for Vietnam women's team

#	Player	Career	Goals	Caps	Ratio
1	**Huỳnh Như**	2011–present	70	124	0.56
2	Lưu Ngọc Mai	1998–2003	57	61	0.93
2	**Phạm Hải Yến**	2011–present	57	104	0.55
4	Nguyễn Thị Tuyết Dung	2011–2025	53	131	0.40
5	Đỗ Thị Ngọc Châm	2002–2014	49	86	0.57
6	Nguyễn Thị Minh Nguyệt	2004–2016	40	92	0.43
7	Nguyễn Thị Muôn	2009–2018	38	70	0.54
8	Đoàn Thị Kim Chi	1998–2010	29	109	0.27
9	**Nguyễn Thị Bích Thùy**	2015–present	25	94	0.27
10	Văn Thị Thanh	2003–2009	23	58	0.40

== Honours ==
=== Continental ===
- Asian Games

Fourth place (1): 2014

=== Regional ===
- ASEAN Women's Championship

Winners (3): 2006, 2012, 2019
(silver) Runners-up (3): 2004, 2008, 2016
(bronze) Third place (6): 2004, 2007, 2011, 2013, 2018, 2025
Fourth place (2): 2015, 2022

- SEA Games

(gold) Gold Medal (8)- record: 2001, 2003, 2005, 2009, 2017, 2019, 2021, 2023
(silver) Silver Medal (3): 2007, 2013, 2025
(bronze) Bronze Medal (1): 1997

== Centuriate goals ==
Goals	Date	Scorer	Venue	Opponent	Score	Result	Competition
1.	7 October 1997	Bùi Thị Hiền Lương	Jakarta, Indonesia	Thailand	1–1	2–3	1997 Southeast Asian Games
100.	30 November 2005	Bùi Thị Tuyết Mai	Marikina, Philippines	Indonesia	8–0	8–0	2005 Southeast Asian Games
200.	16 October 2008	Lê Thị Oanh	Ho Chi Minh City, Vietnam	Laos	5–0	6–0	2008 AFF Women's Championship
300.	15 September 2012	Nguyễn Thị Muôn	Ho Chi Minh City, Vietnam	Philippines	1–0	4–2	2012 AFF Women's Championship
400.	26 July 2016	Nguyễn Thị Liễu	Yangon, Myanmar	Singapore	2–0	14–0	2016 AFF Women's Championship
500.	9 April 2019	Nguyễn Thị Vạn	Tashkent, Uzbekistan	Jordan	1–0	2–0	2020 AFC Women's Olympic Qualifying Tournament
600.	13 July 2022	Phạm Hải Yến	Manila, Philippines	Myanmar	4–0	4–0	2022 AFF Women's Championship
700.	29 June 2025	Nguyễn Thị Vạn	Phú Thọ, Vietnam	Maldives	4–0	7–0	2026 AFC Women's Asian Cup qualification

== Competitive record ==
=== FIFA Women's World Cup ===
FIFA Women's World Cup record
Year	Result	Position	Pld	W	D*	L	GS	GA
(China) 1991	Did not enter							
(Sweden) 1995	Did not enter							
(United States) 1999	Did not enter							
(United States) 2003	Did not qualify							
(China) 2007	Did not qualify							
(Germany) 2011	Did not qualify							
(Canada) 2015	Did not qualify							
(France) 2019	Did not qualify							
Australia & New Zealand 2023 (Note: Vietnam played all of their matches in New Zealand)	Group stage	32nd	3	0	0	3	0	12
(Brazil) 2027	Did not qualify							
United States; Mexico; Costa Rica; Jamaica 2031	To be determined							
(United Kingdom) 2035	To be determined							
Total	Best: Group stage	1/9	3	0	0	3	0	12

FIFA Women's World Cup history
Season	Round	Opponent	Scores	Result	Venue
(Australia) (New Zealand) 2023	Group stage	United States	0–3	Loss	Auckland, New Zealand
(Australia) (New Zealand) 2023	Group stage	Portugal	0–2	Loss	Hamilton, New Zealand
(Australia) (New Zealand) 2023	Group stage	Netherlands	0–7	Loss	Dunedin, New Zealand

=== Olympic Games ===
Summer Olympics record
Year	Result	Position	Pld	W	D*	L	GS	GA
(United States) 1996	Did not enter							
(Australia) 2000	Did not enter							
(Greece) 2004	Did not enter							
(China) 2008	Did not qualify							
(United Kingdom) 2012	Did not qualify							
(Brazil) 2016	Did not qualify							
(Japan) 2020	Did not qualify							
(France) 2024	Did not qualify							
(United States) 2028	Did not qualify							
(Australia) 2032	To be determined							
Total								

=== AFC Women's Asian Cup ===
AFC Women's Asian Cup record
Year	Result	Position	Pld	W	D*	L	GS	GA
(Hong Kong) 1975	Did not enter							
(Taiwan) 1977	Did not enter							
(India) 1980	Did not enter							
(Hong Kong) 1981	Did not enter							
(Thailand) 1983	Did not enter							
(Hong Kong) 1986	Did not enter							
(Hong Kong) 1989	Did not enter							
(Japan) 1991	Did not enter							
(Malaysia) 1993	Did not enter							
(Malaysia) 1995	Did not enter							
(China) 1997	Did not enter							
(Philippines) 1999	Group stage	9th	4	2	0	2	9	16
(Chinese Taipei) 2001	Group stage	7th	4	2	0	2	11	7
(Thailand) 2003	Group stage	7th	3	2	0	1	6	9
(Australia) 2006	Group stage	6th	3	1	0	2	1	7
(Vietnam) 2008	Group stage	6th	3	1	0	2	1	4
(China) 2010	Group stage	7th	3	0	0	3	0	12
(Vietnam) 2014	Group stage	6th	4	1	0	3	4	9
(Jordan) 2018	Group stage	8th	3	0	0	3	0	16
(India) 2022	Quarter-finals	6th	6	2	1	3	7	12
(Australia) 2026	Group stage	9th	3	1	0	2	2	6
(Uzbekistan) 2029	To be determined							
Total:10/20	Sixth place	6th	36	12	1	23	41	98

AFC Women's Asian Cup history
Season	Round	Opponent	Scores	Result	Venue
1999	Group stage	North Korea	1–12	Loss	Iloilo, Philippines
1999	Group stage	Chinese Taipei	1–4	Loss	Iloilo, Philippines
1999	Group stage	India	3–0	Won	Barotac Nuevo, Philippines
1999	Group stage	Malaysia	4–0	Won	Barotac Nuevo, Philippines
2001	Group stage	Guam	2–0	Won	(Chinese Taipei) New Taipei City, Taiwan
2001	Group stage	North Korea	0–4	Loss	(Chinese Taipei) New Taipei City, Taiwan
2001	Group stage	Singapore	8–0	Won	(Chinese Taipei) New Taipei City, Taiwan
2001	Group stage	Japan	1–3	Loss	(Chinese Taipei) New Taipei City, Taiwan
2003	Group stage	China	0–6	Loss	Nakhon Sawan, Thailand
2003	Group stage	Uzbekistan	4–2	Won	Nakhon Sawan, Thailand
2003	Group stage	India	2–1	Won	Nakhon Sawan, Thailand
2006	Group stage	Japan	0–5	Loss	Adelaide, Australia
2006	Group stage	China	0–2	Loss	Adelaide, Australia
2006	Group stage	Chinese Taipei	1–0	Won	Adelaide, Australia
2008	Group stage	China	0–1	Loss	Ho Chi Minh City, Vietnam
2008	Group stage	North Korea	0–3	Loss	Ho Chi Minh City, Vietnam
2008	Group stage	Thailand	1–0	Won	Ho Chi Minh City, Vietnam
2010	Group stage	Australia	0–2	Loss	Chengdu, China
2010	Group stage	China	0–5	Loss	Chengdu, China
2010	Group stage	South Korea	0–5	Loss	Chengdu, China
2014	Group stage	Jordan	3–1	Won	Ho Chi Minh City, Vietnam
2014	Group stage	Japan	0–4	Loss	Ho Chi Minh City, Vietnam
2014	Group stage	Australia	0–2	Loss	Ho Chi Minh City, Vietnam
2014	Fifth place play-off	Thailand	1–2	Loss	Ho Chi Minh City, Vietnam
2018	Group stage	Japan	0–4	Loss	Amman, Jordan
2018	Group stage	Australia	0–8	Loss	Amman, Jordan
2018	Group stage	South Korea	0–4	Loss	Amman, Jordan
2022	Group stage	South Korea	0–3	Loss	Pune, India
2022	Group stage	Japan	0–3	Loss	Pune, India
2022	Group stage	Myanmar	2–2	Draw	Navi Mumbai, India
2022	Quarter-finals	China	1–3	Loss	Navi Mumbai, India
2022	Play-offs	Thailand	2–0	Won	Navi Mumbai, India
2022	Play-offs	Chinese Taipei	2–1	Won	Navi Mumbai, India
2026	Group stage	India	2–1	Won	Perth, Australia
2026	Group stage	Chinese Taipei	0–1	Loss	Perth, Australia
2026	Group stage	Japan	0–4	Loss	Perth, Australia

=== Asian Games ===
Asian Games record
Year	Result	Position	Pld	W	D*	L	GS	GA
(China) 1990	Did not enter							
(Japan) 1994	Did not enter							
(Thailand) 1998	Group stage	6th	3	0	1	2	1	16
(South Korea) 2002	Group stage	6th	5	0	1	4	2	16
(Qatar) 2006	Group stage	7th	3	0	0	3	2	11
(China) 2010	Group stage	5th	3	1	0	2	4	7
(South Korea) 2014	Fourth place	4th	5	2	0	3	7	12
(Indonesia) 2018	Quarter-finals	5th	3	1	1	1	3	9
(China) 2022	Group Stage	9th	3	2	0	1	8	8
(Japan) 2026	Quarter-finals	8th	4	0	1	3	1	11
(Qatar) 2030	To be determined							
(Saudi Arabia) 2034	To be determined							
Total	Best: Fourth place	8/10	29	6	4	19	28	90

Asian Games history
Season	Round	Opponent	Scores	Result	Venue
(Thailand) 1998	Group stage	North Korea	0–7	Loss	Pathum Thani, Thailand
(Thailand) 1998	Group stage	Thailand	1–1	Draw	Pathum Thani, Thailand
(Thailand) 1998	Group stage	Japan	0–8	Loss	Bangkok, Thailand
(South Korea) 2002	Group stage	South Korea	0–4	Loss	Changwon, South Korea
(South Korea) 2002	Group stage	Japan	0–3	Loss	Changwon, South Korea
(South Korea) 2002	Group stage	China	1–4	Loss	Busan, South Korea
(South Korea) 2002	Group stage	Chinese Taipei	1–1	Draw	Yangsan, South Korea
(South Korea) 2002	Group stage	North Korea	0–4	Loss	Changwon, South Korea
(Qatar) 2006	Group stage	North Korea	0–5	Loss	Doha, Qatar
(Qatar) 2006	Group stage	South Korea	1–3	Loss	Al-Rayyan, Qatar
(Qatar) 2006	Group stage	Chinese Taipei	1–3	Loss	Doha, Qatar
(China) 2010	Group stage	South Korea	1–6	Loss	Guangzhou, China
(China) 2010	Group stage	China	0–1	Loss	Guangzhou, China
(China) 2010	Group stage	Jordan	3–0	Won	Guangzhou, China
(South Korea) 2014	Group stage	North Korea	0–5	Loss	Incheon, South Korea
(South Korea) 2014	Group stage	Hong Kong	5–0	Won	Incheon, South Korea
(South Korea) 2014	Quarter-finals	Thailand	2–1	Won	Goyang, South Korea
(South Korea) 2014	Semi-finals	Japan	0–3	Loss	Incheon, South Korea
(South Korea) 2014	Bronze medal match	South Korea	0–3	Loss	Incheon, South Korea
(Indonesia) 2018	Group stage	Thailand	3–2	Won	Palembang, Indonesia
(Indonesia) 2018	Group stage	Japan	0–7	Loss	Palembang, Indonesia
(Indonesia) 2018	Quarter-finals	Chinese Taipei	0–0 (a.e.t) (pens. 3–4)	Loss	Palembang, Indonesia
(China) 2022	Group stage	Nepal	2–0	Won	Wenzhou, China
(China) 2022	Group stage	Bangladesh	6–1	Won	Wenzhou, China
(China) 2022	Group stage	Japan	0–7	Loss	Wenzhou, China
(Japan) 2026	Group stage	Chinese Taipei	1–2	Loss	Fukuroi, Japan
(Japan) 2026	Group stage	Japan	0–8	Loss	Fukuroi, Japan
(Japan) 2026	Group stage	Thailand	0–0	Draw	Osaka, Japan
(Japan) 2026	Quarter-finals	China	0–1 (a.e.t)	Loss	Osaka, Japan

=== ASEAN Women's Championship ===
ASEAN Women's Championship record
Year	Result	Position	Pld	W	D*	L	GS	GA
(Vietnam) 2004	Runners-up (B team)	2nd	5	4	1	0	16	2
(Vietnam) 2004	Third place (A team)	3rd	5	2	2	1	19	4
(Vietnam) 2006	Champions	1st	3	3	0	0	5	2
(Myanmar) 2007	Third place	3rd	5	4	0	1	32	3
(Vietnam) 2008	Runners-up	2nd	6	5	0	1	26	3
(Laos) 2011	Third place	3rd	5	4	0	1	34	3
(Vietnam) 2012	Champions	1st	5	4	1	0	23	3
(Myanmar) 2013	Third place	3rd	6	3	2	1	9	3
(Vietnam) 2015	Fourth place	4th	5	3	0	2	18	8
(Myanmar) 2016	Runners-up	2nd	5	3	2	0	24	4
(Indonesia) 2018	Third place	3rd	6	5	0	1	30	7
(Thailand) 2019	Champions	1st	5	5	0	0	24	1
(Philippines) 2022	Fourth place	4th	6	4	0	2	21	8
(Vietnam) 2025	Third place	3rd	5	4	0	1	18	3
Total	3 Trophies	14/14	72	53	8	11	299	54

ASEAN Women's Championship history
Season	Round	Opponent	Scores	Result	Venue
2004 (A team)	Group stage	Thailand U20	0–0	Draw	Vietnam
2004 (A team)	Group stage	Maldives	14–0	Won	Vietnam
2004 (A team)	Group stage	Myanmar	1–1	Draw	Vietnam
2004 (A team)	Semi-finals	Vietnam B	0–2	Loss	Vietnam
2004 (A team)	Third place play-off	Indonesia	4–1	Won	Vietnam
2004 (B team)	Group stage	Singapore	6–0	Won	Vietnam
2004 (B team)	Group stage	Indonesia	1–0	Won	Vietnam
2004 (B team)	Group stage	Philippines	5–0	Won	Vietnam
2004 (B team)	Semi-finals	Vietnam	2–0	Won	Vietnam
2004 (B team)	Final	Myanmar	2–2 (a.e.t) (pens. 2–4)	Loss	Vietnam
2006	Group stage	Chinese Taipei	1–0	Won	Ho Chi Minh City, Vietnam
2006	Group stage	Thailand	3–2	Won	Ho Chi Minh City, Vietnam
2006	Group stage	Myanmar	1–0	Won	Ho Chi Minh City, Vietnam
2007	Group stage	Philippines	9–0	Won	Yangon, Myanmar
2007	Group stage	Malaysia	9–0	Won	Yangon, Myanmar
2007	Group stage	Indonesia	8–0	Won	Yangon, Myanmar
2007	Semi-finals	Thailand	0–3	Loss	Yangon, Myanmar
2007	Third place play-off	Malaysia	6–0	Won	Yangon, Myanmar
2008	Group stage	Myanmar	3–1	Won	Ho Chi Minh City, Vietnam
2008	Group stage	Indonesia	4–0	Won	Ho Chi Minh City, Vietnam
2008	Group stage	Malaysia	11–0	Won	Ho Chi Minh City, Vietnam
2008	Group stage	Laos	6–0	Won	Ho Chi Minh City, Vietnam
2008	Semi-finals	Thailand	2–1	Won	Ho Chi Minh City, Vietnam
2008	Final	Australia	0–1	Loss	Ho Chi Minh City, Vietnam
2011	Group stage	Singapore	9–1	Won	Vientiane, Laos
2011	Group stage	Laos	4–0	Won	Vientiane, Laos
2011	Group stage	Indonesia	14–0	Won	Vientiane, Laos
2011	Semi-finals	Myanmar	1–2	Loss	Vientiane, Laos
2011	Third place play-off	Laos	6–0	Won	Vientiane, Laos
2012	Group stage	Singapore	10–0	Won	Ho Chi Minh City, Vietnam
2012	Group stage	Philippines	4–2	Won	Ho Chi Minh City, Vietnam
2012	Group stage	Myanmar	2–1	Won	Ho Chi Minh City, Vietnam
2012	Semi-finals	Laos	7–0	Won	Ho Chi Minh City, Vietnam
2012	Final	Myanmar	0–0 (a.e.t) (pens. 4–3)	Won	Ho Chi Minh City, Vietnam
2013	Group stage	Thailand	0–0	Draw	Yangon, Myanmar
2013	Group stage	Malaysia	1–0	Won	Yangon, Myanmar
2013	Group stage	Jordan	4–0	Won	Yangon, Myanmar
2013	Group stage	Australia U20	0–0	Draw	Yangon, Myanmar
2013	Semi-finals	Japan U23	2–1 (a.e.t)	Loss	Yangon, Myanmar
2013	Third place play-off	Myanmar	3–1	Won	Yangon, Myanmar
2015	Group stage	Myanmar	3–2	Won	Ho Chi Minh City, Vietnam
2015	Group stage	Malaysia	7–0	Won	Ho Chi Minh City, Vietnam
2015	Group stage	Philippines	4–0	Won	Ho Chi Minh City, Vietnam
2015	Semi-finals	Thailand	1–2 (a.e.t)	Loss	Ho Chi Minh City, Vietnam
2015	Third place play-off	Australia U20	3–4	Loss	Ho Chi Minh City, Vietnam
2016	Group stage	Singapore	14–0	Won	Mandalay, Myanmar
2016	Group stage	Philippines	4–0	Won	Mandalay, Myanmar
2016	Group stage	Thailand	2–0	Won	Mandalay, Myanmar
2016	Semi-finals	Myanmar	3–3 (a.e.t) (pens. 5–4)	Won	Mandalay, Myanmar
2016	Final	Thailand	1–1 (a.e.t) (pens. 5–6)	Loss	Mandalay, Myanmar
2018	Group stage	Indonesia	6–0	Won	Palembang, Indonesia
2018	Group stage	Singapore	10–0	Won	Palembang, Indonesia
2018	Group stage	Philippines	5–0	Won	Palembang, Indonesia
2018	Group stage	Myanmar	4–3	Won	Palembang, Indonesia
2018	Semi-finals	Australia U20	2–4	Loss	Palembang, Indonesia
2018	Third place play-off	Myanmar	3–0	Won	Palembang, Indonesia
2019	Group stage	Cambodia	10–0	Won	Chonburi, Thailand
2019	Group stage	Indonesia	7–0	Won	Chonburi, Thailand
2019	Group stage	Myanmar	4–0	Won	Chonburi, Thailand
2019	Semi-finals	Philippines	2–1	Won	Chonburi, Thailand
2019	Final	Thailand	1–0 (a.e.t)	Won	Chonburi, Thailand
2022	Group stage	Cambodia	3–0	Won	Biñan, Philippines
2022	Group stage	Laos	5–0	Won	Biñan, Philippines
2022	Group stage	Timor-Leste	6–0	Won	Biñan, Philippines
2022	Group stage	Myanmar	4–0	Won	Manila, Philippines
2022	Semi-finals	Philippines	0–4	Loss	Manila, Philippines
2022	Third place play-off	Myanmar	3–4	Loss	Manila, Philippines
2025	Group stage	Cambodia	6–0	Won	Haiphong, Vietnam
2025	Group stage	Indonesia	7–0	Won	Haiphong, Vietnam
2025	Group stage	Thailand	1–0	Won	Haiphong, Vietnam
2025	Semi-finals	Australia U23	1–2	Loss	Haiphong, Vietnam
2025	Third place play-off	Thailand	3–1	Won	Haiphong, Vietnam

=== Southeast Asian Games ===
SEA Games record
Year	Result	Position	Pld	W	D*	L	GS	GA
(Thailand) 1985	Did not enter							
(Thailand) 1995	Did not enter							
(Indonesia) 1997	Bronze medal	3rd	4	2	0	2	8	6
(Malaysia) 2001	Gold medal	1st	4	3	1	0	16	1
(Vietnam) 2003	Gold medal	1st	5	5	0	0	17	3
(Philippines) 2005	Gold medal	1st	5	4	0	1	15	2
(Thailand) 2007	Silver medal	2nd	4	3	0	1	16	4
(Laos) 2009	Gold medal	1st	5	2	3	0	14	3
(Myanmar) 2013	Silver medal	2nd	4	3	0	1	13	2
(Malaysia) 2017	Gold medal	1st	4	3	1	0	13	2
(Philippines) 2019	Gold medal	1st	4	3	1	0	10	1
(Vietnam) 2021	Gold medal	1st	4	4	0	0	11	1
(Cambodia) 2023	Gold medal	1st	5	4	0	1	13	3
2025	Silver medal	2nd	5	3	1	1	14	1
2027	To be determined							
2029	To be determined							
2031	To be determined							
2033	To be determined							
Total	8 Gold medals	1st	53	39	7	7	160	29

Southeast Asian Games history
Season	Round	Opponent	Scores	Result	Venue
1997	Group stage	Thailand	2–3	Loss	Bogor, Indonesia
1997	Group stage	Philippines	2–0	Won	Bogor, Indonesia
1997	Semi-finals	Myanmar	2–3	Loss	Bogor, Indonesia
1997	Bronze medal match	Indonesia	2–0	Won	Jakarta, Indonesia
2001	Group stage	Indonesia	6–0	Won	Kuala Lumpur, Malaysia
2001	Group stage	Singapore	5–0	Won	Kuala Lumpur, Malaysia
2001	Semi-finals	Myanmar	1–1 (a.e.t) (pens. 6–5)	Won	Kuala Lumpur, Malaysia
2001	Gold medal match	Thailand	4–0	Won	Kuala Lumpur, Malaysia
2003	Group stage	Indonesia	6–0	Won	Hai Phong, Vietnam
2003	Group stage	Malaysia	3–1	Won	Hai Phong, Vietnam
2003	Group stage	Philippines	3–0	Won	Hai Phong, Vietnam
2003	Semi-finals	Thailand	3–1	Won	Hai Phong, Vietnam
2003	Gold medal match	Myanmar	2–1	Won	Hai Phong, Vietnam
2005	Group stage	Myanmar	0–1	Loss	Marikina, Philippines
2005	Group stage	Thailand	1–0	Won	Marikina, Philippines
2005	Group stage	Philippines	5–0	Won	Marikina, Philippines
2005	Group stage	Indonesia	8–0	Won	Marikina, Philippines
2005	Gold medal match	Myanmar	1–0	Won	Marikina, Philippines
2007	Group stage	Philippines	10–0	Won	Nakhon Ratchasima, Thailand
2007	Group stage	Laos	4–1	Won	Nakhon Ratchasima, Thailand
2007	Semi-finals	Myanmar	2–1 (a.e.t)	Won	Nakhon Ratchasima, Thailand
2007	Gold medal match	Thailand	0–2	Loss	Nakhon Ratchasima, Thailand
2009	Group stage	Malaysia	8–0	Won	Vientiane, Laos
2009	Group stage	Myanmar	1–1	Draw	Vientiane, Laos
2009	Group stage	Thailand	2–2	Draw	Vientiane, Laos
2009	Group stage	Laos	3–0	Won	Vientiane, Laos
2009	Gold medal match	Thailand	0–0 (a.e.t) (pens. 3–0)	Won	Vientiane, Laos
2013	Group stage	Philippines	7–0	Won	Mandalay, Myanmar
2013	Group stage	Myanmar	1–0	Won	Mandalay, Myanmar
2013	Semi-finals	Malaysia	4–0	Won	Mandalay, Myanmar
2013	Gold medal match	Thailand	1–2	Loss	Mandalay, Myanmar
2017	Group stage	Philippines	3–0	Won	Kuala Lumpur, Malaysia
2017	Group stage	Myanmar	3–1	Won	Kuala Lumpur, Malaysia
2017	Group stage	Thailand	1–1	Draw	Shah Alam, Malaysia
2017	Group stage	Malaysia	6–0	Won	Shah Alam, Malaysia
2019	Group stage	Thailand	1–1	Draw	Biñan, Philippines
2019	Group stage	Indonesia	6–0	Won	Biñan, Philippines
2019	Semi-finals	Philippines	2–0	Won	Biñan, Philippines
2019	Gold medal match	Thailand	1–0 (a.e.t)	Won	Manila, Philippines
2021	Group stage	Philippines	2–1	Won	Quảng Ninh, Vietnam
2021	Group stage	Cambodia	7–0	Won	Quảng Ninh, Vietnam
2021	Semi-finals	Myanmar	1–0	Won	Quảng Ninh, Vietnam
2021	Gold medal match	Thailand	1–0	Won	Quảng Ninh, Vietnam
2023	Group stage	Malaysia	3–0	Won	Phnom Penh, Cambodia
2023	Group stage	Myanmar	3–1	Won	Phnom Penh, Cambodia
2023	Group stage	Philippines	1–2	Loss	Phnom Penh, Cambodia
2023	Semi-finals	Cambodia	4–0	Won	Phnom Penh, Cambodia
2023	Gold medal match	Myanmar	2–0	Won	Phnom Penh, Cambodia
2025	Group stage	Malaysia	7–0	Won	Chonburi, Thailand
2025	Group stage	Philippines	0–1	Loss	Chonburi, Thailand
2025	Group stage	Myanmar	2–0	Won	Chonburi, Thailand
2025	Semi-finals	Indonesia	5–0	Won	Chonburi, Thailand
2025	Gold Medal Match	Philippines	0–0 (a.e.t) (pens. 5–6)	Loss	Chonburi, Thailand

== Head-to-head record ==
As of 25 September 2026, after the match against China.

Against	First Played	P	W	D	L	GF	GA	GD	Confederation
Australia	2008	9	0	0	9	1	44	−43	AFC
Bangladesh	2023	1	1	0	0	6	1	+5	AFC
Bahrain	2013	1	1	0	0	8	0	+8	AFC
Cambodia	2019	5	5	0	0	30	0	+30	AFC
China	2002	16	0	0	16	3	56	−53	AFC
Chinese Taipei	1997	17	7	4	6	24	24	0	AFC
Colombia	2018	1	0	0	1	0	2	−2	CONMEBOL
France	2022	1	0	0	1	0	7	−7	UEFA
Germany	2023	1	0	0	1	1	2	−1	UEFA
Guam	2001	2	2	0	0	6	0	+6	AFC
Hong Kong	2006	6	6	0	0	24	3	+21	AFC
India	1999	6	5	1	0	14	4	+10	AFC
Indonesia	1997	14	14	0	0	82	1	+81	AFC
Iran	2008	3	3	0	0	13	2	+11	AFC
Japan	1998	16	0	0	16	2	77	−75	AFC
Jordan	2010	10	9	1	0	24	4	+20	AFC
North Korea	1998	8	0	0	8	1	41	−40	AFC
South Korea	2002	12	0	0	12	4	44	−40	AFC
Kyrgyzstan	2009	2	2	0	0	22	1	+21	AFC
Laos	2007	10	10	0	0	61	1	+60	AFC
Malaysia	1997	13	12	0	1	64	2	+62	AFC
Maldives	2004	4	4	0	0	42	0	+42	AFC
Mexico	2016	1	0	0	1	0	1	−1	CONCACAF
Myanmar	1997	38	26	7	5	78	40	+38	AFC
Netherlands	2023	1	0	0	1	0	7	-7	UEFA
Nepal	2023	3	3	0	0	9	1	+8	AFC
New Zealand	2023	1	0	0	1	0	2	−2	OFC
Philippines	1997	20	16	1	3	73	10	+63	AFC
Portugal	2023	1	0	0	1	0	2	–2	UEFA
Singapore	1997	9	9	0	0	75	1	+74	AFC
Syria	2017	1	1	0	0	11	0	+11	AFC
Tajikistan	2021	1	1	0	0	7	0	+7	AFC
Thailand	1997	39	20	10	9	54	40	+14	AFC
Timor-Leste	2022	1	1	0	0	6	0	+6	AFC
United Arab Emirates	2025	1	1	0	0	6	0	+6	AFC
United States	2023	1	0	0	1	0	3	−3	CONCACAF
Uzbekistan	2003	7	5	0	2	14	6	+8	AFC
Total	1997	271	157	24	90	739	412	+327	

== See also ==
- Vietnam women's national under-20 football team
- Vietnam women's national under-17 football team
