= Rainer Willfeld =

German professional football manager (born 1945)

Personal information
- Date of birth: 1 February 1945 (age 81)
- Place of birth: Germany

Managerial career
- Years: Team
- 1986–1991: Togo U17
- 1999–2004: Vietnam (technical director)
- 2004–2010: Burkina Faso (U17)
- 2014–2015: Burundi

Rainer Willfeld (born 1 February 1945) is a German professional football manager.

== Career ==
Between 1999 and 2004, Willfeld worked as the technical director for the Vietnam Football Federation and regularly takes charges of Vietnam's women's national team or youth national teams.

He was in control of the Burkina Faso national under 17 team during the 2009 FIFA U-17 World Cup.

Between April 2014 and February 2015 he was the head coach of the Burundi national football team.
