= Vĩnh Long =

Vĩnh Long may refer to:

- Vĩnh Long province, a province in the Mekong Delta of southern Vietnam
- Vĩnh Long (city), former provincial city of Vĩnh Long province
