= Nakhon Ratchasima Municipal Stadium =

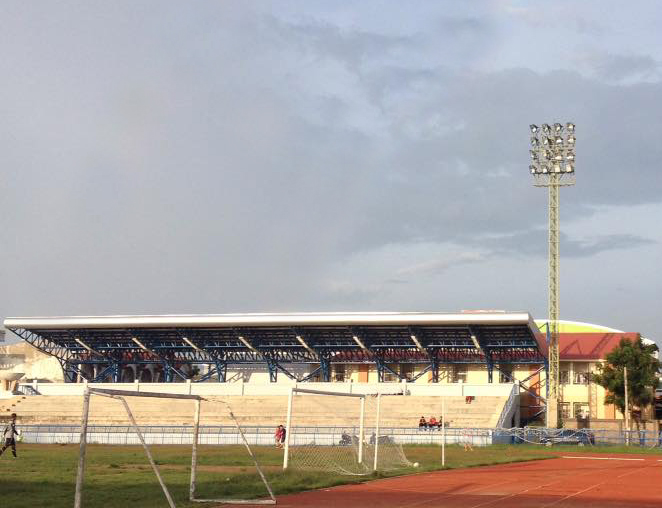
- Interactive map of Nakhon Ratchasima Municipal Stadium
- Location: Kila Klang Road, Mueang Nakhon Ratchasima, Nakhon Ratchasima, Thailand
- Coordinates: 14.989206°N 102.111333°E
- Owner: Nakhon Ratchasima Municipality
- Operator: Nakhon Ratchasima Municipality
- Capacity: 2,000
- Surface: Grass

The Nakhon Ratchasima Municipal Stadium (Thai: สนามกีฬากลางเทศบาลนครนครราชสีมา) is a multi-use sports stadium in Nakhon Ratchasima, Thailand. It is the former home of Nakhon Ratchasima F.C. who left the municipal stadium for the 80th Birthday Stadium in June 2008.

The stadium is built in the typical Thai style. There are two side stands and no supporter accommodation at each end. The main stand is single tier with a concrete cantilever roof and extends for about thirty metres each side of the halfway line. This stand contains offices and dressing rooms. The stand has red bench seats which were added for the 2007 SEA Games as the stadium hosted some football matches (mainly women's and some men's group games). Opposite the main stand is an uncovered and unseated stand which runs for about the same length as the main stand. In common with almost every stadium in Thailand, there is an athletics track.

The stadium was last used by Korat for a pre-season friendly in February 2009 against Sisaket FC.

The last matches of note played at the stadium were on 22 July 2009 when Vongchavalitkul University beat Rayong FC in the second round of the Thai FA Cup and on 7 April 2010 when Bangkok Christian College F.C. defeated Nakhon Ratchasima Sports School (playing as 'Korat United') in the first round of the same competition.
