= Postage stamps and postal history of Annam and Tongking =

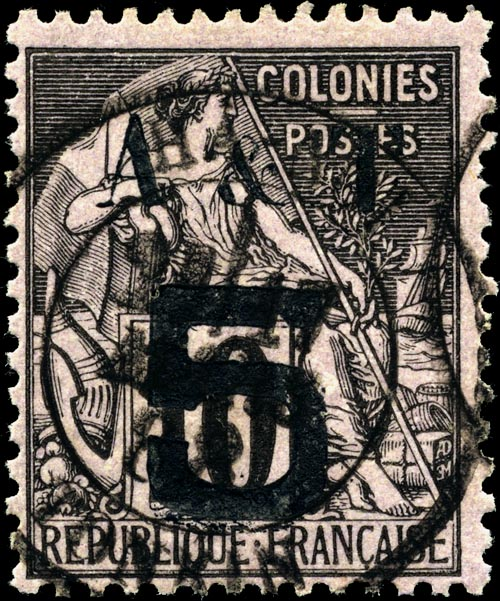
5c Annam & Tonkin overprint used at Hanoi

A concise postal history of French Annam protectorate and Tongking protectorate, former territories of colonial French Indochina, that were located in present-day Vietnam. Dates 1888 - 1892

== Stamp issues ==
=== Overview ===
The protectorate government over Annam and Tonkin issued only a single series of stamps. On 21 January 1888 the protectorates overprinted "A & T" or "A – T" (an abbreviation for the French protectorates of Annam and Tonkin) on nine different French colonial commerce type stamps. These overprints included a surcharge of either 1 centime or 5 centimes. The surcharges that were added to these postage stamps come in different types with various letters and numerals and a variety of errors are known to exist.

By the year 1892 the regular issue postage stamps of French Indochina had replaced the overprint issues of Annam & Tonkin.

=== List ===
Dates
1888 - 1892
Currency
100 centimes = 1 franc
Refer
Indo-China Territories

== Geography ==
Tongking, also spelt Tonkin, is the northern part of Vietnam. Annam comprises most of central Vietnam.

Capital
Hanoi
Frontiers
Tongking is bounded by China (north); Gulf of Tongking (east); Annam (south); Laos (west). Annam is bounded by Tongking (north); Cochinchina (south); South China Sea (east); Cambodia and Laos (west).
Language
Vietnamese and French.
Religion
Mahayana Buddhism, Taoism and Confucianism

== History ==
1885
Annam & Tongking became French protectorates following war with China.
1887
Included in Indochina with Cambodia and Cochinchina.
1888
(21 January) One issue was released with 9 stamps. These stamps were French Colonial Commerce types overprinted A&T plus a surcharge of either 1 or 5 centimes.
1892
The issue was replaced by stamps of Indochina.
1893
Laos was added to the union.
1949
(14 June) Annam & Tongking became part of the new colony of Vietnam.

== Sources ==
- Stanley Gibbons Ltd: various catalogues
- Rossiter, Stuart & John Flower. The Stamp Atlas. London: Macdonald, 1986. ISBN 0-356-10862-7
- Encyclopaedia of Postal History
