= Cambodia women's national football team results =

This article provides details of international association football games played by the Cambodia women's national football team.

== Result ==
Key
| Win |
| Draw |
| Defeat |

== 2018 ==
| 30 June 2018 AFF Women's Championship | Cambodia | 12–0 | Timor-Leste | Palembang, Indonesia |
| 19:00 UTC+7 | Koemhong 11', 21', 28', 40', 58', 65'; Cheavey 14', 39', 35'; Kunthea 61'; Minea 63'; Sreyleab 70' | | | Stadium: Bumi Sriwijaya Stadium; Attendance: 100; Referee: Abirami Apbai Naidu (Singapore) |

| 2 July 2018 AFF Women's Championship | Cambodia | 0–4 | Malaysia | Palembang, Indonesia |
| 19:00 UTC+7 | | | Norhanisa 5'; Norsuriani 58', 77'; Haindee 79' | Stadium: Bumi Sriwijaya Stadium; Attendance: 150; Referee: Abirami Apbai Naidu (Singapore) |

| 4 July 2018 AFF Women's Championship | Thailand | 11–0 | Cambodia | Palembang, Indonesia |
| 16:00 UTC+7 | Nildhamrong 5', 9', 52', 73'; Intamee 12'; Sudarat 27' (pen.); Rattikan 33', 82'; Pitsamai 38'; Ponyosuk 59'; Alisa 75' | Report | | Stadium: Bumi Sriwijaya Stadium; Attendance: 100; Referee: Abirami Apbai Naidu (Singapore) |

| 6 July 2018 AFF Women's Championship | Australia U20 | 12–0 | Cambodia | Bumi Sriwijaya Stadium, Palembang |
| 16:00 | Fowler 10', 12', 18', 27', 31'; Gordon 14'; McNamara 29'; Barbieri 42', 57', 87'; Ibini 69'; Chidiac 90' | Report | | Attendance: 100; Referee: Thein Thein Aye (Myanmar) |

== 2019 ==
| 16 August 2019 2019 AFF Women's Championship | Vietnam | 10–0 | Cambodia | Chonburi, Thailand |
| 18:00 | Huỳnh Như 3', 7'; Sreyneat 4' (o.g.); Phạm Hải Yến 15', 16', 84'; Nguyễn Thị Bích Thùy 17', 19', 24', 69' | Report | | Stadium: IPE Chonburi Stadium 1 Attendance: 150; Referee: Abirami Abpai Naidu (Singapore) |

| 18 August 2019 2019 AFF Women's Championship | Cambodia | 1–10 | Myanmar | Chonburi, Thailand |
| 18:00 | Nimol 77' (pen.) | Report | May Thu Kyaw 30'; Khin Marlar Tun 31'; Yee Yee Oo 45+5', 73', 90', 90+4'; Win Theingi Tun 60', 90+3'; Khin Moe Wai 64'; Thin Thin Yu 79' | Stadium: IPE Chonburi Stadium 1 Attendance: 90; Referee: Pansa Chaisanit (Thailand) |

| 20 August 2019 2019 AFF Women's Championship | Cambodia | 0–4 | Indonesia | Chonburi, Thailand |
| 18:00 UTC+7 | | Report | Mayang 21'; Dewi 25', 90+1'; Amiatun 90+4' | Stadium: IPE Chonburi Stadium 1 Attendance: 20; Referee: Pansa Chaisanit (Thailand) |

== 2020 and 2021 ==
Cambodia football national team have no football matches because due to COVID-19 pandemic.

== 2022 ==
| 9 May 2022 2021 Southeast Asian Games | Philippines | 5–0 | Cambodia | Cẩm Phả, Vietnam |
| 19:00 UTC+7 | Flanigan 27'; Bolden 65'; Madarang 68'; Quezada 76'; Castañeda 80' | Report | | Stadium: Cẩm Phả Stadium; Attendance: 5,120; Referee: Haruna Kanematsu (Japan) |

| 14 May 2022 2021 Southeast Asian Games | Cambodia | 0–7 | Vietnam | Cẩm Phả, Vietnam |
| 19:00 UTC+7 | | Report | Nguyễn Thị Vạn 6', 77'; Phạm Hải Yến 58' (pen.); Nguyễn Thị Tuyết Dung 65'; Trần Thị Thu 79'; Ngân Thị Vạn Sự 81'; Dương Thị Vân 87' | Stadium: Cẩm Phả Stadium; Attendance: 16,000; Referee: Anna Sidorova (Uzbekistan) |

| 5 July 2022 2022 AFF Women's Championship | Laos | 1–1 | Cambodia | Biñan, Philippines |
| 19:00 UTC+8 | Phimpha 21' | Report | Kunthea 90+1' (pen.) | Stadium: Biñan Football Stadium; Attendance: 110; Referee: Pansa Chaisanit (Thailand) |

| 9 July 2022 2022 AFF Women's Championship | Cambodia | 0–3 | Vietnam | Biñan, Philippines |
| 19:00 UTC+8 | | Report | Ngân Thị Vạn Sự 19'; Phạm Hải Yến 32' (pen.); Nguyễn Thị Thanh Nhã 45+1' | Stadium: Biñan Football Stadium; Attendance: 0 Referee: Supiree Testhomya (Thailand) |

| 9 July 2022 2022 AFF Women's Championship | Myanmar | 3–0 | Cambodia | Biñan, Philippines |
| 16:00 UTC+8 | Khin Marlar Tun 32'; Myat Noe Khin 61'; Khin Moe Wai 87' | Report | | Stadium: Biñan Football Stadium; Attendance: 0 Referee: Sunita Thongthawin (Thailand) |

| 13 July 2022 2022 AFF Women's Championship | Cambodia | 3–1 | Timor-Leste | Imus, Philippines |
| 19:00 UTC+8 | Sreyphors 1'; Vipha 25'; Sivhorng 45' | Report | Brigida 76' | Stadium: City of Imus Grandstand, Imus; Attendance: 31; Referee: Jhesa Mae Kaatz (Philippines) |

== 2023 ==
| 17 March 2023 Unofficial Friendly | Cambodia | 0–4 | Myanmar | Kunming, China PR |
| --:-- UTC+8 | | | Rupa Khine 24'; Khin Mo Mo Tun 35', 67'; Shwe Ritun 43' |

| 3 May 2023 2023 Southeast Asian Games | Cambodia | 2–0 | Laos | Phnom Penh, Cambodia |
| 20:00 UTC+7 | Yoeurn 11', 38' | | | Stadium: RSN Stadium; Attendance: 4,530 |

| 6 May 2023 2023 Southeast Asian Games | Singapore | 0–1 | Cambodia | Phnom Penh, Cambodia |
| 20:00 UTC+7 | | | Kunthea 76' (pen.) | Stadium: RSN Stadium; Attendance: 4725 |

| 9 May 2023 2023 Southeast Asian Games | Cambodia | 0–3 | Thailand | Phnom Penh, Cambodia |
| 20:00 UTC+7 | | | Panittha 23'; Nualanong 45+2'; Jiraporn 90+3' | Stadium: RSN Stadium |

| 12 May 2023 2023 Southeast Asian Games SF | Vietnam | 4–0 | Cambodia | Phnom Penh, Cambodia |
| 19:00 UTC+7 | Ngân Thị Vạn Sự 20'; Phạm Hải Yến 30'; Trần Thị Thùy Trang 36' (pen.); Huỳnh Như 90+3' (pen.) | | | Stadium: Olympic Stadium; Attendance: 9,849; Referee: Mahnaz Zokaee (Iran) |

| 15 May 2023 2023 Southeast Asian Games Bronze medal match | Cambodia | 0–6 | Thailand | Phnom Penh, Cambodia |
| 16:00 UTC+7 | | | Saowalak 16', 33'; Jiraporn 25'; Panittha 52'; Pattaranan 54', 88' | Stadium: Olympic Stadium; Referee: Tian Jin (China) |

| September 2022 Asian Games | Singapore | Cancelled | Cambodia | Hangzhou, China |
| --:-- UTC+8 |

| September 2022 Asian Games | Cambodia | Cancelled | North Korea | Hangzhou, China |
| --:-- UTC+8 |

== 2024 ==
| 23 November 2024 2024 AFF Women's Cup | Cambodia | 0–0 | Indonesia | Vientiane, Laos |
| 15:00 UTC+7 | | | | Stadium: New Laos National Stadium |

| 29 November 2024 2024 AFF Women's Cup | Cambodia | 2–0 | Malaysia | Vientiane, Laos |
| 15:00 UTC+7 | Kunthea 18'; Sapheourn 45+2' | | | Stadium: New Laos Stadium Reserve Field |

| 2 December 2024 AFF Women's Cup SF | Cambodia | 3–0 | Timor-Leste | Vientiane, Laos |
| 15:30 UTC+7 | Vipha 36' (pen.); Kunthea 74', 90' | Report | | Stadium: New Laos National Stadium; Referee: Asaka Koizumi (Japan) |

| 5 December 2024 AFF Women's Cup Final | Cambodia | 1–3 | Indonesia | Vientiane, Laos |
| 17:30 UTC+7 | | | | Stadium: New Laos National Stadium |

== 2025 ==
| June 25 Friendly | Cambodia | 1–0 | Guam | Phnom Penh, Cambodia |
| 19:00 UTC+7 | Vipha 17' | Report | | Stadium: Olympic Stadium; Referee: Sunita Thongthawin (Thailand) |

| June 29 2026 AFC Women's Asian Cup qualification | Hong Kong | 1–1 | Cambodia | Phnom Penh, Cambodia |
| 19:00 UTC+7 | Leung H. 31' (pen.) | Report | Sothan 82' | Stadium: Olympic Stadium |

| July 2 2026 AFC Women's Asian Cup qualification | Cambodia | 0–6 | Philippines | Phnom Penh, Cambodia |
| 19:00 UTC+7 | | Report | Pino 18'; Serrano 19', 36'; Nimol 40' (o.g.); Long 48'; C.McDaniel 48' | Stadium: Olympic Stadium; Referee: Oh Hyeon-Jeong (South Korea) |

| July 5 2026 AFC Women's Asian Cup qualification | Cambodia | 2–1 | Saudi Arabia | Phnom Penh, Cambodia |
| 19:00 UTC+7 | Sovanmony 84'; Serysitha 90+5' | Report | Al-Angari 79' | Stadium: Olympic Stadium; Referee: Veronika Bernatskaia (Kyrgyzstan) |

| 6 August 2025 ASEAN Women's Championship | Vietnam | 6–0 | Cambodia | Haiphong |
| 19:30 UTC+7 | Dương Thị Vân 7'; Ngân Thị Vạn Sự 11'; Phạm Hải Yến 14' (pen.); Nguyễn Thị Vạn 17'; Nguyễn Thị Trúc Hương 51'; Thái Thị Thảo 60' | Report | | Stadium: Lạch Tray Stadium; Referee: Muhammad Izzul (Malaysia) |

| 9 August 2025 ASEAN Women's Championship | Cambodia | 0–7 | Thailand | Haiphong, Vietnam |
| 16:30 UTC+7 | | Report | Casteen 38', 45+2'; Janista 40', 47', 90'; Thawanrat 70'; Ploychompoo 81' | Stadium: Lạch Tray Stadium; Referee: Rustam Lutfullin (Uzbekistan) |

| 12 August 2025 ASEAN Women's Championship | Indonesia | 1–1 | Cambodia | Phú Thọ, Vietnam |
| 19:30 UTC+7 | Nurrohmah 82' | Report | Saody 76' | Stadium: Việt Trì Stadium; Referee: Yu Hong (China) |

== 2026 ==
| 6 June Garuda Championship Series | Singapore | 0–5 | Cambodia | Bandung, Indonesia |
| 19:00 UTC+7 | | Report | Hok Saody 13', 15'; Ti Samnang; Yon Yoeurn 78'; Vibol Serysitha 84' | Stadium: Arcamanik Stadium |

| 9 June Garuda Championship Series | Indonesia | 1–1 | Cambodia | Bandung, Indonesia |
| --:-- UTC+8 | Siti 54' | Report | Sapheourn 55' | Stadium: Arcamanik Stadium |

| 13 July 2026 AFF Women's Cup GS | Cambodia | 3–1 | Timor-Leste | Kuala Lumpur, Malaysia |
| 16:45 UTC+8 | Sovanmony 29'; Sapheourn 36'; Serysitha 90+6' | Report | Juleica 2' | Stadium: Kuala Lumpur Stadium; Referee: Zin Mar Oo (Myanmar) |

| 16 July 2026 AFF Women's Cup GS | Indonesia | 1–1 | Cambodia | Shah Alam, Malaysia |
| 16:45 UTC+8 | Sheva 40' | Report | Serysitha 47' | Stadium: UiTM Stadium; Referee: Asaka Koizumi (Japan) |

| 19 July 2026 AFF Women's Cup SF | Cambodia | 0–1 | Laos | Kuala Lumpur, Malaysia |
| 16:45 UTC+8 | | | Anna 1' | Stadium: Kuala Lumpur Stadium |

| 22 July 2026 AFF Women's Cup Third place match | Cambodia | 1–1 (3–4 p) | Singapore | Kuala Lumpur, Malaysia |
| 16:45 UTC+8 | Vipha 70' (pen.) | Report | Tan 24' | Stadium: Kuala Lumpur Stadium; Referee: Jon Mick Pineda (Philippines) |
| | Penalties |
| | Maysam (penalty scored); Vipha (penalty scored); Serysitha (penalty missed); Samnang (penalty scored); Sovannomy (penalty missed) | | (penalty scored) Mulan; (penalty missed) Li Xian; (penalty scored) Ruzi; (penalty scored) Farah; (penalty scored) Sarah |
