= Singapore women's national football team results =

- Win Draw Loss

This article lists the results and fixtures for the Singapore women's national football team.

== Acronyms ==
Acronyms	Full Name
WC	FIFA World Cup
AFC	Asian Football Federation
AFF	ASEAN Football Federation
Q	Qualification rounds
PO	Play-off round
GS	Group stage
R32	Round of 32
R16	Round of 16
QF	Quarter-finals
SF	Semi-finals
3rd PO	Third place match/play-off
F	Final

== Head-to-head record ==
The following table shows Singapore' overall international record per opponent since 2021.

Positive (more wins than losses)
Neutral (as many wins as losses)
Negative (more losses than wins)

Opponent	First (Note: Based on "Head to head" records on inside.fifa.com.)	Last	Pld	W	D	L	GF	GA	GD	W%	Confederation
Australia U23	2022	2022	1	0	0	1	1	4	–3	0	AFC
Bangladesh	2017	2023	2	0	0	2	0	11	–11	0	AFC
Bhutan	2025	2025	1	0	0	1	2	3	–1	0	AFC
Cambodia	2023	2026	3	0	1	2	1	7	–6	0	AFC
Hong Kong	1991	2022	2	0	0	2	0	5	–5	0	AFC
Indonesia	2001	2026	9	2	0	7	7	17	–10	22.22	AFC
Iran	2017	2025	1	0	0	1	0	4	–4	0	AFC
Jordan	2025	2025	1	0	0	1	0	5	–5	0	AFC
Laos	2007	2026	4	3	1	0	5	2	3	75	AFC
Lebanon	2025	2025	1	0	0	1	0	1	–1	0	AFC
Macau	2017	2024	1	1	0	0	9	0	9	100	AFC
Malaysia	1991	2026	2	1	1	0	3	1	+2	50	AFC
Myanmar	1995	2022	1	0	0	1	0	1	–1	0	AFC
Mongolia	2018	2023	1	0	1	0	2	2	0	0	AFC
North Korea	1991	2023	2	0	0	2	0	17	–17	0	AFC
Pakistan	2023	2023	1	1	0	0	1	0	1	100	AFC
Papua New Guinea	2005	2022	1	0	0	1	0	1	–1	0	OFC
Philippines	1995	2022	1	0	0	1	0	7	–7	0	AFC
Saudi Arabia	2025	2025	2	0	0	2	0	6	–6	0	AFC
Seychelles	2022	2025	3	3	0	0	22	2	20	100	CAF
Timor-Leste	2019	2024	2	1	1	0	2	1	1	50	AFC
Thailand	1985	2025	5	0	0	5	0	18	–18	0	AFC
Total	—N/a	—N/a	47	12	5	30	55	115	–60	25.53	—N/a

Last update: Cambodia vs Singapore, 22 July 2026.

== Results ==
Win Draw Loss Void

=== 2021 ===
4 Apr 2021 2022 Asian Cup Q	Singapore	0–1	Indonesia	Dushanbe, Tajikistan
18:00 (UTC+5)		Report (FIFA); Report (AFC)	Baiq 4'	Stadium: Pamir Stadium; Attendance: 0 Referee: Lee Yi-chi (Chinese Taipei)

8 Apr 2021 2022 Asian Cup Q	Indonesia	1–0	Singapore	Dushanbe, Tajikistan
18:00 (UTC+5)	Octavianti 30'	Report (FIFA); Report (AFC)		Stadium: Pamir Stadium; Attendance: 0 Referee: Choki Om (Bhutan)

=== 2022 ===
4 Apr 2022 2022 FAS Tri-Nations Series	Singapore	6–2	Seychelles	Jalan Besar, Singapore
20:30 (UTC+8)	Dominguez 18', 25'; Tan 52', 90+4' (pen.); Chu 72'; Nurerwadah 90+2'	Report	Bibi 30', 71'	Stadium: Jalan Besar Stadium; Attendance: 1,498; Referee: Nathan Chan (Singapore)

8 Apr 2022 2022 FAS Tri-Nations Series	Singapore	0–1	Papua New Guinea	Jalan Besar, Singapore
20:30 (UTC+8)			Emhabe 74'	Stadium: Jalan Besar Stadium; Attendance: 2,344

10 May 2022 2021 SEA Games	Thailand	3–0	Singapore	Quảng Ninh, Vietnam
19:00 (UTC+7)	Kanyanat 7'; Nutwadee 17'; Chatchawan 21'	Report		Stadium: Cẩm Phả Stadium; Attendance: 5,000; Referee: Lê Thị Ly (Vietnam)

13 May 2022 2021 SEA Games	Laos	0–1	Singapore	Quảng Ninh, Vietnam
16:00 (UTC+7)		Report	Izzati 90+5'	Stadium: Cẩm Phả Stadium; Referee: Esra'a Mahmoud (Jordan)

15 May 2022 2021 SEA Games	Singapore	0–1	Myanmar	Quảng Ninh, Vietnam
16:00 (UTC+7)		Report	Win Theingi Tun 90+4'	Stadium: Cẩm Phả Stadium; Referee: Esra'a Mahmoud (Jordan)

23 Jun 2022 Friendly	Singapore	0–4	Hong Kong	Jalan Besar, Singapore
20:00 (UTC+8)		Report	Lau 12', 13'; Chan 53'; Leung 89'	Stadium: Jalan Besar Stadium

26 Jun 2022 Friendly	Hong Kong	1–0	Singapore	Jalan Besar, Singapore
20:00 (UTC+8)	Tsang 22'	Report		Stadium: Jalan Besar Stadium

4 Jul 2022 2022 AFF Women's Championship	Singapore	0–0	Malaysia	Manila, Philippines
16:00 (UTC+8)		Report		Stadium: Rizal Memorial Stadium; Attendance: 235; Referee: Aung Seinn Cho (Myanmar)

6 Jul 2022 2022 AFF Women's Championship	Philippines	7–0	Singapore	Manila, Philippines
19:00 (UTC+8)	Flanigan 9'; Ernie 10' (o.g.); Annis 19'; Bolden 38'; Eggesvik 47'; Hawkinson 56'; Castañeda 69'	Report		Stadium: Rizal Memorial Stadium; Attendance: 647; Referee: Supiree Testhomya (Thailand)

8 Jul 2022 2022 AFF Women's Championship	Thailand	3–0	Singapore	Biñan, Vietnam
19:00 (UTC+8)	Saengrawee 22'; Tipkritta 49'; Jiraporn 72'	Report		Stadium: Biñan Football Stadium; Attendance: 0 Referee: Công Thị Dung (Vietnam)

10 Jul 2022 2022 AFF Women's Championship	Singapore	1–4	Australia U23	Manila, Philippines
16:00 (UTC+8)	Lincoln 89' (o.g.)	Report	Heatley 11'; Hunter 17'; Lowry 47'; Gallagher 70'	Stadium: Rizal Memorial Stadium; Attendance: 334; Referee: Supiree Testhomya (Thailand)

12 Jul 2022 2022 AFF Women's Championship	Indonesia	0–2	Singapore	Biñan, Vietnam
19:00 (UTC+8)		Report	Izzati 45+1'; Syazwani 90+2'	Stadium: Biñan Football Stadium; Attendance: 58; Referee: Bùi Thị Thu Trang (Vietnam)

10 Oct 2022 Friendly	Singapore	1–2	Indonesia	Jalan Besar, Singapore
20:00 (UTC+8)	Ruhaizat 86'	Report	Awi 51'; Meisyaroh 90+3'	Stadium: Jalan Besar Stadium

=== 2023 ===
1 Apr 2023 Women’s Olympic Qualifying	Singapore	0–6	Thailand	Chonburi, Thailand
17:00 (UTC+7)		Report	Orapin 8'; Pluemjai 21'; Saowalak 58', 77'; Jiraporn 65'; Panittha 87'	Stadium: Chonburi Stadium; Attendance: 500; Referee: Thein Thein Aye (Myanmar)

4 Apr 2023 Women’s Olympic Qualifying	Mongolia	2–2	Singapore	Chonburi, Thailand
17:00 (UTC+7)	Narmandakh 3', 90+4'	Report	Tan 42'; Izzati 79'	Stadium: Chonburi Stadium; Attendance: 50; Referee: Nodira Mirzoeva (Tajikistan)

3 May 2023 2023 SEA Games	Thailand	4–0	Singapore	Phnom Penh, Cambodia
16:00 (UTC+7)	Saowalak 5'; Orapin 18'; Nipawan 28'; Jiraporn 66'			Stadium: RSN Stadium; Attendance: 931

6 May 2023 2023 SEA Games	Singapore	0–1	Cambodia	Phnom Penh, Cambodia
20:00 (UTC+7)			Kunthea 76' (pen.)	Stadium: RSN Stadium; Attendance: 4,725; Referee: Mahnaz Zokaee (Iran)

9 May 2023 2023 SEA Games	Singapore	2–1	Laos	Phnom Penh, Cambodia
16:00 (UTC+7)	Nicole Lim 45+2'; Izzati 61'		Dalavone 90'	Stadium: RCAF Old Stadium; Attendance: 364

18 Jul 2023 Friendly	Singapore	1–0	Pakistan	Jalan Besar, Singapore
19:30 (UTC+8)	Nurzahirah 81'	Report		Stadium: Jalan Besar Stadium

24 Sep 2023 2022 Asian Games	North Korea	7–0	Singapore	Wenzhou, China
19:30 (UTC+8)	Hong 11'; Ri 14'; Myong 51'; Ju 54'; Ri Hak 58'; Kim 62'; Sung 90+3'	Report		Stadium: Wenzhou Sports Center Stadium; Attendance: 5,320; Referee: Haneen Murad (Jordan)

27 Sep 2023 2022 Asian Games	Singapore	0–10	North Korea	Wenzhou, China
16:00 (UTC+8)		Report	Kim 3', 19' (pen.), 36', 45+1', 90+7'; An 15', 60'; Ri 17'; Myong 42'; Pong 71'	Stadium: Wenzhou Sports Center Stadium; Attendance: 3,669; Referee: Doumouh Al Bakkar (Lebanon)

1 Dec 2023 Friendly	Bangladesh	3–0	Singapore	Dhaka, Bangladesh
16:00 BST (UTC+6)	Khandakar 3'; T. Khatun 16', 60'	Report		Stadium: Bir Sherestha Shaheed Shipahi Mostafa Kamal Stadium; Referee: Appuhamila Pabasara Minisarani (Sri Lanka)

4 Dec 2023 Friendly	Bangladesh	8–0	Singapore	Dhaka, Bangladesh
15:00 BST (UTC+6)	T. Khatun 16', 24'; Ritu Chakma 18', 62'; S. Akhter 57'; Khatun 75'; Matsushima 87'; Shamsunnahar Jr. 90+1'	Report		Stadium: Bir Sherestha Shaheed Shipahi Mostafa Kamal Stadium; Referee: Choki Om (Bhutan)

=== 2024 ===
28 May 2024 Friendly	Indonesia	5–1	Singapore	Jakarta, Indonesia
20:00 UTC+8	Yuliana 11', 67'; Scheunemann 64', 86' (pen.); Oktaviani 90+6'		Chu 20'	Stadium: GBK Madya Stadium

16 Jul 2024 Friendly	Singapore	9–0	Macau	Jalan Besar, Singapore
20:00 UTC+8	Chu 37'; Syaliza 45+3', 85'; Lim 50'; Tan 54', 61', 65'; Azman 57'; Taylor 90'	Report		Stadium: Jalan Besar Stadium

26 Nov 2024 2024 AFF Cup GS	Singapore	1–1	Timor-Leste	Vientiane, Laos
16:00 UTC+8	Ruhaizat 41'	Report	Pereira 90+4'	Stadium: New Laos National Stadium; Referee: Zainal Nurul Ain Izatty (Malaysia)

29 Nov 2024 2024 AFF Cup GS	Laos	0–1	Singapore	Vientiane, Laos
16:00 UTC+8		Report		Stadium: New Laos National Stadium; Attendance: 356; Referee: Pansa Chaisanit (Thailand)

2 Dec 2024 2024 AFF Cup SF	Singapore	0–3	Indonesia	Vientiane, Laos
20:30 UTC+8		Report	Scheunemann 6'; Octaviani 45'; Dwi 90+4'	Stadium: New Laos National Stadium; Referee: Cha Min-ji (South Korea)

5 Dec 2024 2024 AFF Cup Third place	Timor-Leste	0–1	Singapore	Vientiane, Laos
20:00 UTC+8		Report	Syaliza 6'	Stadium: New Laos National Stadium

=== 2025 ===
12 Jun 2025 Friendly (Note: Closed-door friendly)	Singapore	–	Hong Kong	Kallang, Singapore
				Stadium: Kallang Football Hub; Attendance: 0 (Behind-closed-doors)
Note: The closed-door friendly saw full squad rotation

15 Jun 2025 Friendly	Singapore	Abandoned	Hong Kong	Choa Chu Kang, Singapore
			Anke Leung 31'	Stadium: Choa Chu Kang Stadium
Note: Match abandoned due to inclement weather

7 Jul 2025 2026 Asian Cup Q	Bhutan	3–2	Singapore	Amman, Jordan
16:00 UTC+3	Bidha 1'; Edon 67'; Rai 87'	Report	Ganeswaran 10'; Edon 26' (o.g.)	Stadium: King Abdullah II Stadium

10 Jul 2025 2026 Asian Cup Q	Singapore	0–4	Iran	Amman, Jordan
16:00 UTC+3		Report	Ghohrood 18'; Didar 47'; Zaharin 77' (o.g.); Ghanbari 86'	Stadium: King Abdullah II Stadium

13 Jul 2025 2026 Asian Cup Q	Jordan	5–0	Singapore	Amman, Jordan
19:00 UTC+3	Jbarah 9', 64'; Al-Bitar 43'; Al-Jamaeen 66'; Sweilem 84'	Report		Stadium: King Abdullah II Stadium

19 Jul 2025 2026 Asian Cup Q	Singapore	0–1	Lebanon	Amman, Jordan
16:00 UTC+3		Report	Iskandar 64'	Stadium: King Abdullah II Stadium

25 Oct 2025 Friendly	Singapore	0–1	Saudi Arabia	Abu Dhabi, UAE
23:00 UTC+8		Report	Mobarak 80'	Stadium: 321 Sports Arena

29 Oct 2025 Friendly	Singapore	0–5	Saudi Arabia	Abu Dhabi, UAE
23:00 UTC+8		Report	Mukhayzin 22' (pen.); Mansour 56'; Al-Enezi 59'; Abdulrazak 82' (pen.); Al-Brahim 84'	Stadium: 321 Sports Arena

25 Nov 2025 Friendly	Singapore	9–0	Seychelles	Bukit Gombak, Singapore
19:30 UTC+8	Ruhaizat; S. Zu’risqha; R. Azman; S. Rosielin; (o.g.)	Report		Stadium: Bukit Gombak Stadium; Attendance: 0 (Behind-closed-doors)

28 Nov 2025 Friendly	Singapore	7–0	Seychelles	Bukit Gombak, Singapore
19:30 UTC+8	L.X. Lim 13'; F. Ruhaizat 16'; S. Zu’risqha 36', 40'; D. Tan 51', 71'; S. Nurinsyirah 65'	Report		Stadium: Bukit Gombak Stadium

7 Dec 2025 2025 SEA Games	Singapore	1–3	Indonesia	Chonburi, Thailand
16:00 UTC+7	Ruhaizat 22'		Warps 31'; Scheunemann 62'; Aulia 90+5'	Stadium: IPE Chonburi Stadium; Referee: Esra'a Almbaidin (Jordan)

10 Dec 2025 2025 SEA Games	Thailand	2–0	Singapore	Chonburi, Thailand
18:30 UTC+7	Kanyanat 9'; Orapin 18'	Report		Stadium: Chonburi Stadium; Referee: Rebecca Durcau (Australia)

=== 2026 ===
3 Jun 2026 Friendly	Indonesia	0–2	Singapore	Bandung, Indonesia
20:00 UTC+8			Danelle Tan 10'; Nicole Lim 22'	Stadium: Arcamanik Stadium

6 Jun 2026 Friendly	Singapore	0–5	Cambodia	Bandung, Indonesia
19:00 UTC+8		Report	Hok Saody 13', 15'; Ti Samnang; Yon Yoeurn 78'; Vibol Serysitha 84'	Stadium: Arcamanik Stadium

13 July 2026 2026 AFF Cup GS	Singapore	1–1	Laos	Kuala Lumpur, Malaysia
20:45 UTC+8	Tan 47'	Report	Anna 41'	Stadium: Kuala Lumpur Stadium; Referee: Bùi Thị Thu Trang (Vietnam)

16 July 2026 2026 AFF Cup GS	Malaysia	1–3	Singapore	Kuala Lumpur, Malaysia
20:45 UTC+8	Henrietta 58'	Report	Suresh 12'; Tan 44', 72' (pen.)	Stadium: Kuala Lumpur Stadium; Referee: Pansa Chaisanit (Thailand)

19 July 2026 2026 AFF Cup SF	Singapore	0–2	Indonesia	Kuala Lumpur, Malaysia
20:45 UTC+8		Report	Gea 68'; Remini 80'	Stadium: Kuala Lumpur Stadium; Referee: Asaka Koizumi (Japan)

22 July 2026 2026 AFF Cup Third place	Cambodia	1–1 (3–4 p)	Singapore	Kuala Lumpur, Malaysia
16:45 UTC+8	Vipha 70' (pen.)	Report	Tan 24'	Stadium: Kuala Lumpur Stadium; Referee: Jon Mick Pineda (Philippines)
	Penalties
	Maysam (penalty scored); Vipha (penalty scored); Serysitha (penalty missed); Samnang (penalty scored); Sovannomy (penalty missed)		(penalty scored) Mulan; (penalty missed) Li Xian; (penalty scored) Ruzi; (penalty scored) Farah; (penalty scored) Sarah

1 December 2026 Friendly	Singapore	v	Bangladesh	Singapore
19:30 UTC+8				Stadium: Bishan Stadium
Note: Match will be held behind closed doors at Bishan Stadium.

5 December 2026 Friendly	Singapore	v	Bangladesh	Singapore
19:30 UTC+8				Stadium: Jalan Besar Stadium

== See also ==
- Singapore men's national football team results
