= United States v Thailand (2019 FIFA Women's World Cup) =

International women's association football match

2019 FIFA Women's World Cup Group F
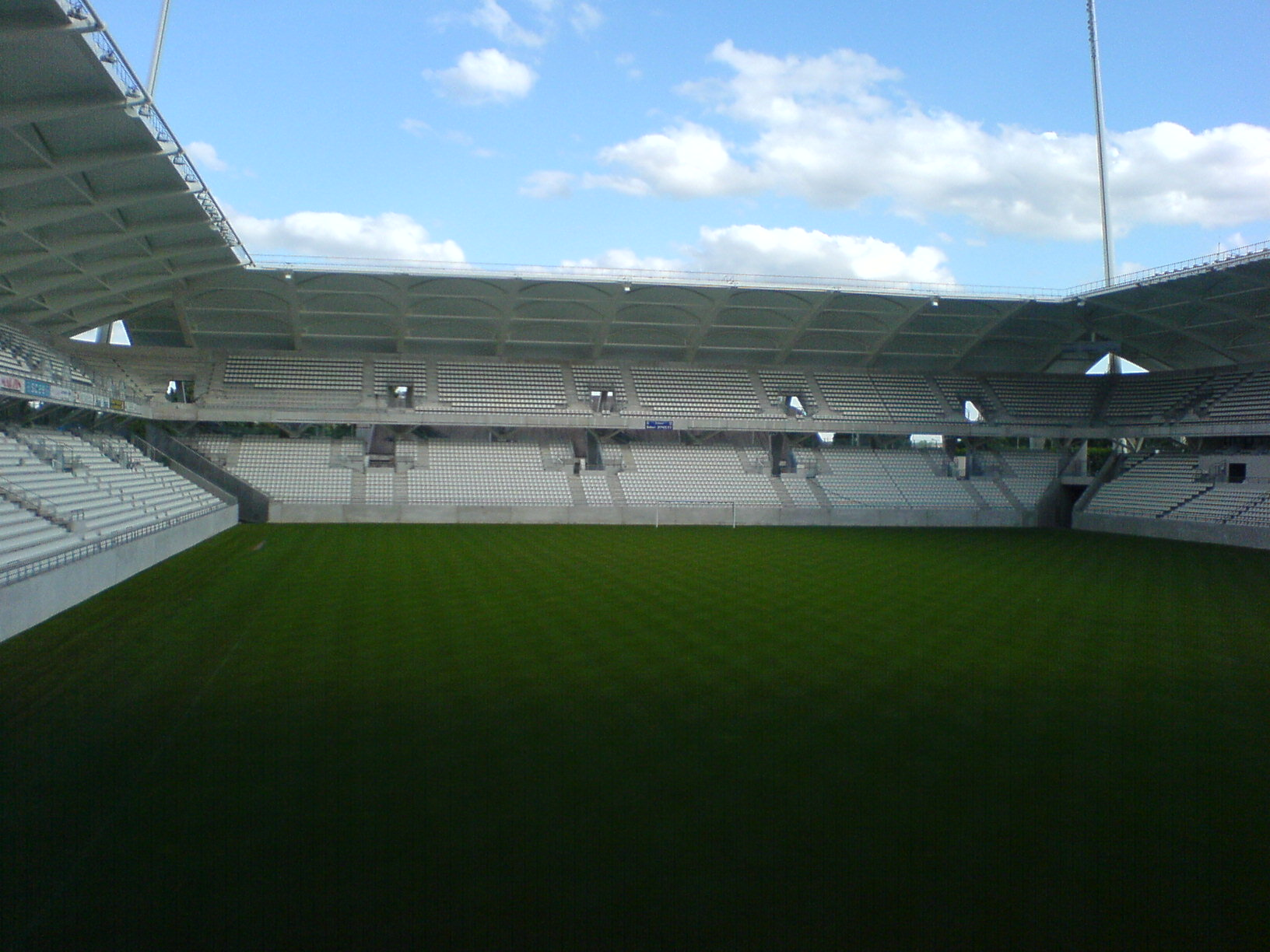
- The Stade Auguste-Delaune held the match
- Event: 2019 FIFA Women's World Cup
United States	Thailand
(United States)	(Thailand)
13	0
- Date: 11 June 2019
- Venue: Stade Auguste-Delaune, Reims
- Referee: Laura Fortunato (Argentina)
- Attendance: 18,591

United States v Thailand was the first game to be played in Group F of the group stage of the 2019 FIFA Women's World Cup. The game was played in the Stade Auguste-Delaune in Reims, France, on June 11, 2019, between the women's national football (soccer) teams of the United States and Thailand. The United States won the match 13–0, making it the biggest ever victory in the FIFA Women's World Cup.

Alex Morgan scored five times, tying a tournament and team record set by Michelle Akers for most goals scored by a player in a single World Cup match, while four other U.S. team members scored their first World Cup goals in their debut at the tournament. The USWNT also set a record for most goals in one half, with 10, including four goals in six minutes.

== Background ==
Thailand had qualified for their second consecutive World Cup, having debuted in the 2015 FIFA Women's World Cup. The core of the 2019 Thailand squad was retained for the 2019 tournament with Miranda Nild as an addition. Nuengrutai Srathongvian was their head coach for both the 2015 and 2019 tournaments. The team was backed by billionaire Nualphan Lamsam as its team manager and sponsor.

Due to the group they were drawn in, they faced Sweden and Chile, as well as the defending champions of the U.S. team.

The two national teams had only met once prior to this match: a 2016 exhibition game in Columbus, Ohio, in which Thailand lost 9-0.

== Match ==
=== Detail ===
11 June 2019
21:00

United States	13–0	Thailand
Morgan 12', 53', 74', 81', 87'; Lavelle 20', 56'; Horan 32'; Mewis 50', 54'; Rapinoe 79'; Pugh 85'; Lloyd 90+2'	Report

Stade Auguste-Delaune, Reims
Attendance: 18,591
Referee: Laura Fortunato (Argentina)

United States	Thailand

GK	1	Alyssa Naeher
RB	5	Kelley O'Hara
CB	7	Abby Dahlkemper
CB	8	Julie Ertz	(substituted off) 69'
LB	19	Crystal Dunn
CM	16	Rose Lavelle	(substituted off) 57'
CM	3	Sam Mewis
CM	9	Lindsey Horan
RF	17	Tobin Heath	(substituted off) 57'
CF	13	Alex Morgan
LF	15	Megan Rapinoe (c)
Substitutions:
FW	10	Carli Lloyd	(substituted on) 57'
FW	23	Christen Press	(substituted on) 57'
FW	2	Mallory Pugh	(substituted on) 69'
Manager:
Jill Ellis

GK	18	Sukanya Chor Charoenying
RB	9	Warunee Phetwiset		(substituted off) 71'
CB	3	Natthakarn Chinwong
CB	2	Kanjanaporn Saenkhun
LB	10	Sunisa Srangthaisong
RM	7	Silawan Intamee
CM	20	Wilaiporn Boothduang		(substituted off) 35'
CM	5	Ainon Phancha
LM	12	Rattikan Thongsombut		(substituted off) 65'
CF	21	Kanjana Sungngoen (c)
CF	8	Miranda Nild
Substitutions:
MF	6	Pikul Khueanpet		(substituted on) 35'
FW	17	Taneekarn Dangda	(yellow card) 72'	(substituted on) 65'
FW	13	Orathai Srimanee		(substituted on) 71'
Manager:
Nuengrutai Srathongvian

Player of the Match:
Alex Morgan (United States)

Assistant referees:
Mariana de Almeida (Argentina)
Mary Blanco (Colombia)
Fourth official:
Claudia Umpiérrez (Uruguay)
Reserve assistant referee:
Luciana Mascaraña (Uruguay)
Video assistant referee:
Mauro Vigliano (Argentina)
Assistant video assistant referees:
José María Sánchez Martínez (Spain)
Sarah Jones (New Zealand)

== Reactions ==
The U.S. team was criticized for celebrating their later goals during the match, with media commentators and former players calling it disrespectful. The celebrations were defended by other commentators, the team's players, and members of the Thai team.

Thai goalkeeper Sukanya Chor Charoenying was disappointed with the result but thanked American forward Carli Lloyd for consoling her shortly after the match.

Former Canadian player Kaylyn Kyle received death threats for criticizing the U.S. team's behavior on television after the game.

2019 FIFA Women's World Cup – Group F

Pos	Team	Pld	W	D	L	GF	GA	GD	Pts	Qualification
1	United States	3	3	0	0	18	0	+18	9	Advance to knockout stage
2	Sweden	3	2	0	1	7	3	+4	6	Advance to knockout stage
3	Chile	3	1	0	2	2	5	−3	3	
4	Thailand	3	0	0	3	1	20	−19	0	

Source: FIFA

== See also ==
- Hungary v El Salvador (1982 FIFA World Cup), the biggest victory in men's FIFA World Cup
- Thailand at the FIFA Women's World Cup
- United States at the FIFA Women's World Cup
