= 2024 AFF Women's Cup =

ເຕະບານຍິງ AFF 2024

Tournament details
- Host country: Laos
- Dates: 23 November – 5 December
- Teams: 6 (from 1 sub-confederation)
- Venues: 2 (in 1 host city)

Final positions
- Champions: Indonesia (1st title)
- Runners-up: Cambodia
- Third place: Singapore
- Fourth place: Timor-Leste

Tournament statistics
- Matches played: 10
- Goals scored: 16 (1.6 per match)
- Top scorer(s): (Cambodia) Poeurn Kunthea (Indonesia) Reva Octaviani (3 goals each)
- Best player: (Indonesia) Reva Octaviani
- Best goalkeeper: (Indonesia) Laita Roati

The 2024 AFF Women's Cup was the first edition of the AFF Women's Cup, a lower tier international women's football tournament organised by the ASEAN Football Federation (AFF). The tournament was held in Laos.

The top three teams qualified for the 2025 ASEAN Women's Championship. This is the first time the ASEAN Women's Championship had a qualification tournament. Indonesia is the inaugural champion.

== Participating nations ==
Six lowest ranked AFF teams from the 2022 AFF Women's Championship entered the AFF Women's Cup final tournament.

Team	Previous Women's Championship best performance
Cambodia	Group stage (2018, 2019)
Indonesia	Fourth place (2004)
Laos	Fourth place (2011, 2012)
Malaysia	Fourth place (2007)
Singapore	Group stage (2004, 2007, 2008, 2011, 2012, 2016, 2018, 2019)
Timor-Leste	Group stage (2016, 2018, 2019)

== Draw ==
The draw for the 2024 AFF Women's Cup was held on October 19, 2024, in Vientiane, Laos. The teams were allocated into three pots based on their performances in the 2022 AFF Women's Championship. Host Laos were automatically placed in position A1.

Pot 1	Pot 2	Pot 3
1. Cambodia; 2. Laos (host)	3. Singapore; 4. Malaysia	5. Indonesia; 6. Timor-Leste

== Venues ==
Vientiane	Location of stadiums of the 2024 AFF Women's Cup.
Laos National Stadium	Location of stadiums of the 2024 AFF Women's Cup.
Capacity: 25,000	Location of stadiums of the 2024 AFF Women's Cup.
New Laos Reserve Field	Location of stadiums of the 2024 AFF Women's Cup.
Capacity: N/A	Location of stadiums of the 2024 AFF Women's Cup.

== Officials ==
The following officials were chosen for the competition.

Referee

- (Thailand) Pansa Chaisanit
- (South Korea) Cha Min-ji
- (Malaysia) Zainal Nurul Ain Izatty
- (Japan) Asaka Koizumi

Assistant Referee

- (Malaysia) Ha Ali Munirah
- (Laos) Chanthavong Phutsavan
- (Thailand) Hinthong Supawan
- (Mongolia) Unurjargal Battsetseg

== Group stage ==
Tiebreakers

Ranking in each group shall be determined as follows:

1. Greater number of points obtained in all the group matches;
2. Goal difference in all the group matches;
3. Greater number of goals scored in all the group matches;
4. Greater disciplinary points.

If two or more teams are equal on the basis on the above four criteria, the place shall be determined as follows:

1. Result of the direct match between the teams concerned;
2. Penalty shoot-out if only the teams are tied, and they met in the last round of the group;
3. Drawing lots by the Organising Committee.

All times are local time: (ICT) UTC+7.

=== Group A ===
Pos	Team	Pld	W	D	L	GF	GA	GD	Pts	Qualification
1	Singapore	2	1	1	0	2	1	+1	4	Knockout stage
2	Timor-Leste	2	0	2	0	1	1	0	2	Knockout stage
3	Laos (H)	2	0	1	1	0	1	−1	1	

Source: ASEAN Football
Rules for classification: Group stage tiebreakers
(H) Hosts
23 November 2024
19:30

Timor-Leste	0–0	Laos
	Pre-match; Report; Report

New Laos National Stadium, Vientiane
Referee: Pansa Chaisanit (Thailand)

26 November 2024
15:00

Singapore	1–1	Timor-Leste
Ruhaizat 41'	Report	Pereira 90+4'

New Laos National Stadium, Vientiane
Referee: Zainal Nurul Ain Izatty (Malaysia)

29 November 2024
15:00

Laos	0–1	Singapore
	Report	Chang 22'

New Laos National Stadium, Vientiane
Attendance: 356
Referee: Pansa Chaisanit (Thailand)

=== Group B ===
Pos	Team	Pld	W	D	L	GF	GA	GD	Pts	Qualification
1	Cambodia	2	1	1	0	2	0	+2	4	Knockout stage
2	Indonesia	2	1	1	0	1	0	+1	4	Knockout stage
3	Malaysia	2	0	0	2	0	3	−3	0	

Source: ASEAN Football
Rules for classification: Group stage tiebreakers
23 November 2024
15:00

Indonesia	0–0	Cambodia
	Report

New Laos National Stadium, Vientiane
Referee: Cha Min-ji (South Korea)

26 November 2024
19:30

Malaysia	0–1	Indonesia
	Report	Scheunemann 79'

New Laos National Stadium, Vientiane
Referee: Asaka Koizumi (Japan)

29 November 2024
15:00

Cambodia	2–0	Malaysia
Kunthea 18'; Sapheourn 45+2'	Report

New Laos Reserve Field, Vientiane
Referee: Cha Min-ji (South Korea)

== Knockout stage ==
Semi-finals
2 December – Vientiane
Cambodia	3
Timor-Leste	0
2 December – Vientiane
Singapore	0
Indonesia	3

Final
5 December – Vientiane
Cambodia	1
Indonesia	3
Third place
5 December – Vientiane
Timor-Leste	0
Singapore	1

=== Semi-finals ===
2 December 2024
15:00

Cambodia	3–0	Timor-Leste
Vipha 36' (pen.); Kunthea 74', 90'	Report

New Laos National Stadium, Vientiane
Referee: Asaka Koizumi (Japan)
2 December 2024
19:30

Singapore	0–3	Indonesia
	Report	Scheunemann 6'; Octaviani 45'; Dwi 90+4'

New Laos National Stadium, Vientiane
Referee: Cha Min-ji (South Korea)

=== Third place ===
5 December 2024
15:00

Timor-Leste	0–1	Singapore
	Report	Syaliza 6'

New Laos National Stadium, Vientiane
Referee: Cha Min-ji (South Korea)

Timor-Leste	Singapore

GK	12	Gorette Andrade
DF	2	Maria Conceição
DF	4	Idália Belo	(substituted off) 44'
DF	5	Brigida da Costa
DF	6	Sonia Amaral
MF	7	Dolores Costa (c)
MF	10	Vanessa Fernandes
DF	13	Júlia Belo	(substituted off) 35'
MF	16	Juleica da Costa
FW	17	Natacia Pereira
FW	19	Godelivia Martins
Substitutions:
MF	8	Astari Songge	(substituted on) 35'
FW	9	Elvira da Silva	(substituted on) 44'
Manager:
Vicente Ramos Freitas

GK	23	Nurul Illyanis
DF	2	Syazwani Ruzi
DF	4	Yasmine Zaharin
DF	5	Qarissa Ramadhani
MF	11	Putri Syaliza
DF	18	Rosnani Azman (c)
DF	20	Nurhidayu Naszri	(substituted off) 90+4'
MF	6	Natasha Naszri
FW	7	Cara Chang	(substituted off) HT'
MF	21	Venetia Lim
FW	10	Farah Nurzahirah
Substitutions:
MF	14	Summer Chong	(substituted on) HT' (substituted off) 83'
FW	8	Faith Ho	(substituted on) 83'
FW	9	Chloe Koh	(substituted on) 90+4'
Manager:
(Morocco) Karim Bencherifa

=== Final ===
5 December 2024
19:30

Cambodia	1–3	Indonesia
Saody 32'	Report	Octaviani 24', 57'; Hopper 35'

New Laos National Stadium, Vientiane
Referee: Asaka Koizumi (Japan)

Cambodia	Indonesia

GK	1	Chea Fariya
MF	4	Chhiv Selena
DF	6	Somrit Nimol
MF	8	Ti Samnang		(substituted off) 87'
FW	9	Yon Yoeurn		(substituted off) 81'
MF	10	Soeurn Vipha
FW	11	Heng Sovanmony		(substituted off) HT'
MF	12	Hok Saody
DF	13	Vibol Serysitha		(substituted off) 72'
FW	15	Chhit Sapheourn
DF	20	Hear Sreilas (c)		(substituted off) 81'
Substitutions:
DF	19	Poeurn Kunthea	(yellow card) 84'	(substituted on) HT'
DF	3	Kin Ramksa		(substituted on) 72'
MF	17	Keo Channa		(substituted on) 81'
DF	2	Mak Sreyroth		(substituted on) 81'
DF	14	Sem Malin		(substituted on) 87'
Manager:
Khoun Laboravy

GK	1	Laita Roati
FW	17	Vivi Oktavia
DF	5	Gea Yumanda
DF	13	Safira Ika		(substituted off) HT'
DF	16	Ellen Tria		(substituted off) HT'
MF	19	Viny Silfianus (c)
MF	20	Katarina Stalin
MF	8	Reva Octaviani		(substituted off) 90'
FW	9	Claudia Scheunemann
MF	10	Sheva Imut	(yellow card) 89'
FW	11	Sydney Hopper
Substitutions:
DF	2	Agnes Hutapea		(substituted on) HT'
FW	18	Rosdilah Nurrohmah		(substituted on) HT'
FW	22	Estella Loupatty		(substituted on) 90'
Manager:
(Japan) Satoru Mochizuki

== Goalscorers ==
There were 16 goals scored in 9 matches, for an average of 1.78 goals per match.

3 goals

- (Cambodia) Poeurn Kunthea
- (Indonesia) Reva Octaviani

2 goals

- (Indonesia) Claudia Scheunemann

1 goal

- (Cambodia) Chhit Sapheourn
- (Cambodia) Soeurn Vipha
- (Indonesia) Octavianti Dwi
- (Indonesia) Sydney Hopper
- (Singapore) Cara Chang
- (Singapore) Farhanah Ruhaizat
- (Singapore) Putri Syaliza
- (Timor-Leste) Natacia Pereira

== Awards ==
Best Player	Top Goalscorer	Best Goalkeeper
(Indonesia) Reva Octaviani	(Cambodia) Poeurn Kunthea (Indonesia) Reva Octaviani	(Indonesia) Laita Roati

== Final ranking ==
Pos	Team	Pld	W	D	L	GF	GA	GD	Pts	Qualification
1	Indonesia	4	3	1	0	7	1	+6	10	2025 ASEAN Women's Championship
2	Cambodia	4	2	1	1	6	3	+3	7	2025 ASEAN Women's Championship
3	Singapore	4	2	1	1	3	4	−1	7	Withdrew (Note: Initially Singapore qualified to ASEAN Women's Championship as third place team, but they withdrew and replaced by Timor-Leste)
4	Timor-Leste	4	0	2	2	1	5	−4	2	2025 ASEAN Women's Championship
5	Laos	2	0	1	1	0	1	−1	1	
6	Malaysia	2	0	0	2	0	3	−3	0	

Source: AFF
