= 2017 AFF U-16 Girls' Championship =

Tournament details
- Host country: Laos
- City: Vientiane
- Dates: 8–20 May
- Teams: 9

Final positions
- Champions: Thailand (1st title)
- Runners-up: Philippines
- Third place: Myanmar
- Fourth place: Cambodia

Tournament statistics
- Matches played: 20
- Goals scored: 75 (3.75 per match)
- Top scorer(s): (Myanmar) Myat Noe Khin (Thailand) Ploychompoo Somnuek (6 goals each)
- Fair play award: Thailand

The 2017 AFF U-16 Girls' Championship was the 2nd edition of the AFF U-16 Girls' Championship, an international women's football tournament organised by the ASEAN Football Federation (AFF). The tournament was hosted by Laos in Vientiane from 8 to 20 May 2017. All matches were played at the New Laos National Stadium.The defending champion is Australia but they didn't participate in this edition.

== Participants ==
=== Group A ===
Association
Thailand
Vietnam
Myanmar
Laos
Malaysia

=== Group B ===
Association
Singapore
Cambodia
Philippines
Indonesia

== Venue ==
(Laos) Vientiane
New Laos National Stadium
Capacity: 25,000

== Group stage ==
=== Group A ===
Pos	Team	Pld	W	D	L	GF	GA	GD	Pts	Qualification
1	Thailand	4	4	0	0	12	0	+12	12	Knockout stage
2	Myanmar	4	3	0	1	8	5	+3	9	Knockout stage
3	Vietnam	4	2	0	2	5	4	+1	6	
4	Laos (H)	4	1	0	3	6	9	−3	3	
5	Malaysia	4	0	0	4	5	18	−13	0	

Source: AFF
(H) Hosts
8 May 2017
18:30 UTC+7

Myanmar	2–1	Laos
Myat Noe Khin 3'; Zin Mar Htwe 10'	Report	Phatdala 70'

New Laos National Stadium, Vientiane
Attendance: 700
Referee: Cong Thi Dung (Vietnam)
8 May 2017
16:00 UTC+7

Thailand	1–0	Vietnam
Trịnh Thị Thuỳ Linh 4' (o.g.)	Report

New Laos National Stadium, Vientiane
Attendance: 150
Referee: Thein Thein Aye (Myanmar)
10 May 2017
16:00 UTC+7

Thailand	1–0	Myanmar
Kotchaphon 19'	Report

New Laos National Stadium, Vientiane
Attendance: 200
Referee: Bui Thi Thu Trang (Vietnam)
10 May 2017
18:30 UTC+7

Malaysia	2–5	Laos
Joinin 18'; Rajak 53'	Report	Phatdala 3'; Vongsingkham 5', 40' (pen.); Phommachanh 44', 80'

New Laos National Stadium, Vientiane
12 May 2017
16:00 UTC+7

Malaysia	0–7	Thailand
	Report	Pattaranan 18'; Trinity 25'; Pluemjai 34'; Ploychompoo 40', 46', 64'; Janista 72'

New Laos National Stadium, Vientiane
Attendance: 100
Referee: Sein Cho Aung (Myanmar)
12 May 2017
18:30 UTC+7

Vietnam	1–2	Myanmar
Trần Thị Thu Xuân 27'	Report	Myat Noe Khin 33'; Su Pyae Pyae Kyaw 61'

New Laos National Stadium, Vientiane
Attendance: 300
Referee: Nuntikan Buasa (Thailand)
14 May 2017
16:00 UTC+7

Malaysia	1–2	Vietnam
Justine 33' (pen.)	Report	Trần Thị Thu Xuân 3'; Đặng Thanh Thảo 70'

New Laos National Stadium, Vientiane
Attendance: 200
Referee: Thein Thein Aye (Myanmar)
14 May 2017
18:30 UTC+7

Thailand	3–0	Laos
Suchada 16'; Pluemjai 20'; Pe Pe 56' (o.g.)	Report

New Laos National Stadium, Vientiane
Attendance: 1000
Referee: Cong Thi Dung (Vietnam)
16 May 2017
18:30 UTC+7

Vietnam	2–0	Laos
Nguyễn Thị Tú Anh 8'; Trần Thị Thu Xuân 73'	Report

New Laos National Stadium, Vientiane
Attendance: 1000
Referee: Sein Cho Aung (Myanmar)
16 May 2017
16:00 UTC+7

Myanmar	4–2	Malaysia
Myat Noe Khin 4', 34', 57'; Thiri Kyaw 21'	Report	Rajak 31'; Justine 67'

New Laos National Stadium, Vientiane
Attendance: 100
Referee: Nuntikan Buasa (Thailand)

=== Group B ===
Pos	Team	Pld	W	D	L	GF	GA	GD	Pts	Qualification
1	Philippines	3	3	0	0	8	0	+8	9	Knockout stage
2	Cambodia	3	1	1	1	3	5	−2	4	Knockout stage
3	Singapore	3	1	0	2	3	6	−3	3	
4	Indonesia	3	0	1	2	2	5	−3	1	

Source: AFF
9 May 2017
18:30 UTC+7

Singapore	1–2	Cambodia
Sazali 71'	Report	Chun 30'; Muoykanha 79'

New Laos National Stadium, Vientiane
Attendance: 150
Referee: Sein Cho Aung (Myanmar)
9 May 2017
16:00 UTC+7

Philippines	2–0	Indonesia
Viviana 20'; Yap 33'	Report

New Laos National Stadium, Vientiane
Attendance: 80
Referee: Pansa Chaisanit (Thailand)
11 May 2017
16:00 UTC+7

Indonesia	1–2	Singapore
Pattinasarany 28' (pen.)	Report	Sazali 51', 58'

New Laos National Stadium, Vientiane
Attendance: 150
Referee: Cong Thi Dung (Vietnam)
11 May 2017
18:30 UTC+7

Philippines	3–0	Cambodia
Yap 14'; Diaz 40'; Santiago 66'	Report

New Laos National Stadium, Vientiane
Attendance: 200
Referee: Thein Thein Aye (Myanmar)
13 May 2017
18:30 UTC+7

Indonesia	1–1	Cambodia
Pattinasarany 80'	Report	Sreyleak 32'

New Laos National Stadium, Vientiane
Attendance: 350
Referee: Pansa Chaisanit (Thailand)
13 May 2017
16:00 UTC+7

Philippines	3–0	Singapore
Baena 6'; Ralston 62'; Viviana 68'	Report

New Laos National Stadium, Vientiane
Attendance: 100
Referee: Bui Thi Thu Trang (Vietnam)

== Knockout stage ==
In the knockout stage, the penalty shoot-outs are used to decide the winner if necessary (extra time is not used).

Semi-finals
18 May 2017 –Vientiane
Thailand	6
Cambodia	0
18 May 2017 –Vientiane
Philippines	3
Myanmar	2

Final
20 May 2017 –Vientiane
Thailand	6
Philippines	2
Third place
20 May 2017 –Vientiane
Myanmar	3
Cambodia	1

=== Semi-finals ===
18 May 2017
16:00 UTC+7

Thailand	6–0	Cambodia
Trinity 15', 28'; Chatchawan 23'; Ploychompoo 46'; Pattaranan 76'; Kotchaphon 80'	Report

New Laos National Stadium, Vientiane
Attendance: 300
Referee: Thein Thein Aye (Myanmar)
18 May 2017
18:30 UTC+7

Philippines	3–2	Myanmar
Ralston 39', 76'; Viviana 57'	Report	Su Pyae Pyae Kyaw 47', 52'

New Laos National Stadium, Vientiane
Attendance: 500
Referee: Cong Thi Dung (Vietnam)

=== Third place play-off ===
20 May 2017
16:00 UTC+7

Cambodia	1–3	Myanmar
Muoykanha 58'	Report	Zin Mar Htwe 28'; Su Pyae Pyae Kyaw 30'; Myat Noe Khin 80'

New Laos National Stadium, Vientiane
Attendance: 300
Referee: Pansa Chaisanit (Thailand)

=== Final ===
20 May 2017
18:30 UTC+7

Thailand	6–2	Philippines
Ploychompoo 12', 22'; Trinity 30'; Pattaranan 59'; Makasiar 61' (o.g.); Janista 80'	Report	Ralston 18'; Viviana 42'

New Laos National Stadium, Vientiane
Attendance: 1100
Referee: Bui Thi Thu Trang (Vietnam)

Note: All matches had been played for 80 minutes, i.e., each 40 minutes for both first half & second half.

== Winner ==
2017 AFF U-15 Girls' Championship Winners

Thailand
1st title

== Awards ==
Thailand won the fair play trophy.
