= Vicente Ramos =

Vicente Ramos may refer to:

- Vicente Ramos Freitas (born 1985), football player
- Vicente Ramos Cecilio (born 1947), former basketball player from Spain
