= Nguyễn Thị Thúy Hằng =

Vietnamese footballer

Personal information
- Date of birth: 19 November 1997 (age 28)
- Place of birth: Bình Sơn, Quảng Ngãi, Vietnam
- Height: 1.65 m (5 ft 5 in)
- Position: Forward

Team information
- Current team: Thái Nguyên T&T
- Number: 19

Senior career*
Years	Team	Apps	(Gls)
2015–2026	Than KSVN	72	(22)
2026–	Thái Nguyên T&T		

International career^{‡}
2017–	Vietnam	20	(6)
- * Club domestic league appearances and goals ‡ National team caps and goals as of 24 August 2018

Nguyễn Thị Thúy Hằng (born 19 November 1997) is a Vietnamese footballer who plays as a forward for Women's National League club Thái Nguyên T&T and the Vietnam women's national team.

== Career ==
In 2026, Thúy Hằng joined Thái Nguyên T&T.

== International goals ==
Scores and results list Vietnam's goal tally first.

No.	Date	Venue	Opponent	Score	Result	Competition
1.	5 April 2017	Vietnam YTF Center, Hanoi, Vietnam	Syria	10–0	11–0	2018 AFC Women's Asian Cup qualification
2.	5 July 2018	Gelora Sriwijaya Stadium, Palembang, Indonesia	Singapore	1–0	10–0	2018 AFF Women's Championship
3.	5 July 2018	Gelora Sriwijaya Stadium, Palembang, Indonesia	Singapore	5–0	10–0	2018 AFF Women's Championship
4.	5 July 2018	Gelora Sriwijaya Stadium, Palembang, Indonesia	Singapore	9–0	10–0	2018 AFF Women's Championship
5.	3 November 2019	Vietnam YTF Center, Hanoi, Vietnam	India	3–0	3–0	Friendly
6.	25 September 2023	Wenzhou Olympic Sports Center Stadium, Wenzhou, China	Bangladesh	2–0	6–1	2022 Asian Games
