= Miranda Nild =

Thai footballer (born 1997)

Personal information
- Date of birth: 1 April 1997 (age 29)
- Place of birth: Alameda, California, U.S.
- Height: 1.75 m (5 ft 9 in)
- Position: Forward

Team information
- Current team: Oakland Soul

Youth career
- Mustang SC
- 2012: Castro Valley High School
- 2012: Chonburi Sports School
- 2013–2015: Danville SC

College career
Years	Team	Apps	(Gls)
2015–2018	California Golden Bears	73	(13)

Senior career*
Years	Team	Apps	(Gls)
2019–2020	Gintra Universitetas		
2020–2021	OL Reign	2	(0)
2021	→ Kristianstad (loan)	15	(3)
2022	Selfoss	15	(6)
2023–	Oakland Soul	20	(9)

International career^{‡}
2017–2022	Thailand	20	(14)
- * Club domestic league appearances and goals as of 8 May 2025 ‡ National team caps and goals as of 10 June 2019

Miranda Nild (born 1 April 1997), known in Thailand as Suchawadee Nildhamrong (Thai: สุชาวดี นิลธำรงค์; RTGS: Suchaodi Ninthamrong), is a professional footballer who plays as a forward for Oakland Soul in the USL W League. Born in the United States, she played for the Thailand national team.

== Early life ==
Nild is the daughter of Selma and Jerry Nild and sister to her brother Wesley. She attended Castro Valley High School in Castro Valley, California. There, she played soccer under head coach Paul McCallion and was a member of the Varsity golf team during her freshman and sophomore years. In 2013, Nild led her team with 31 goals and 9 assists, helping her receive an All-East Bay First Team selection. In 2014, she led her team with 38 goals, helping her receive another All-East Bay First Team selection and First Team All-WACC Foothill Division selection. Nild also played club soccer under Patrick Uriz with Mustang Soccer and was a member of the 2010 State ODP team.

== College career ==
Nild joined the California Golden Bears in 2015, majoring in American Studies. As a freshman, she made 18 appearances out of a total of 22 contests. She made the first two starts of her career in back-to-back road games versus California Polytechnic State University and versus the University of Colorado Boulder. Nild scored her first collegiate goal in a 2–0 victory against San Francisco on 18 September 2015. During her sophomore year, Nild played in all 21 matches, starting all but 2. She scored twice in the season in the span of 4 games, starting with a goal at Texas Tech University and ending with another versus The University of California, Davis. She was named as a Pac-12 All-Academic honorable mention. As a junior, she made a total of 17 appearances, making 14 starts. Nild led the team with seven goals, including three game-winners, and one assist, for a total of 15 points. She scored in 4 consecutive games dating from 27 August to 15 September, making it the longest goal-scoring streak by any Golden Bear since the 2014 season. Nild recorded her first collegiate assist on Abi Kim's equalizer in the 80th minute versus Santa Clara University. She scored the Golden Bears' only goal in the NCAA Tournament versus Santa Clara University. Nild was voted the team's Offensive MVP for the season. As a senior, she made 17 appearances, starting all but 1. Nild recorded 3 goals and 3 assists.

== Club career ==
Nild signed with Gintra Universitetas in July 2019.

== International career ==
Nild has a Thai father and an American mother. In April 2017, she received her first senior call-up for Thailand. On 3 April, she scored on her debut in a 6–0 victory against Palestine. In March 2018, she was named in the squad for the 2018 AFC Women's Asian Cup. She scored twice in a 6–1 win over Jordan on 9 April and played a role in all three goals against the Philippines on 12 April. Thailand, with one defeat and two wins, finished second in the group and qualified for the 2019 FIFA Women's World Cup. In June 2018, she was named in the squad for the 2018 AFF Women's Championship. On 4 July, she made her first appearance in the tournament, scoring four goals in an 11–0 victory against Cambodia. She finished the tournament with six goals in 5 appearances, helping Thailand claim their third AFF title in a row. In August 2018, she was named in the squad for the 2018 Asian Games. She made two appearances in the tournament, scoring a goal in a 3–2 loss to Vietnam. In February 2019, she was named in the squad for the 2019 Cyprus Women's Cup. She finished the tournament with one goal in four appearances.

== Career statistics ==
=== International goals ===
Results list Thailand's goal tally first.

#	Date	Venue	Opponent	Score	Result	Competition
1.	3 April 2017	Al-Ram, Palestine	Palestine	4–0	6–0	2018 AFC Women's Asian Cup qualification
2.	7 April 2017	Al-Ram, Palestine	Chinese Taipei	1–0	1–0	2018 AFC Women's Asian Cup qualification
3.	9 April 2018	Amman, Jordan	Jordan	1–0	6–1	2018 AFC Women's Asian Cup
4.	9 April 2018	Amman, Jordan	Jordan	5–1	6–1	2018 AFC Women's Asian Cup
5.	4 July 2018	Palembang, Indonesia	Cambodia	1–0	11–0	2018 AFF Women's Championship
6.	4 July 2018	Palembang, Indonesia	Cambodia	2–0	11–0	2018 AFF Women's Championship
7.	4 July 2018	Palembang, Indonesia	Cambodia	7–0	11–0	2018 AFF Women's Championship
8.	4 July 2018	Palembang, Indonesia	Cambodia	9–0	11–0	2018 AFF Women's Championship
9.	6 July 2018	Palembang, Indonesia	Malaysia	4–0	8–0	2018 AFF Women's Championship
10.	19 August 2018	Palembang, Indonesia	Vietnam	1–1	2–3	2018 Asian Games
11.	27 February 2019	Larnaca, Cyprus	Hungary	4–0	4–0	2019 Cyprus Women's Cup
12.	19 August 2019	Chonburi, Thailand	Timor-Leste	6–0	9–0	2019 AFF Women's Championship
13.	19 August 2019	Chonburi, Thailand	Timor-Leste	9–0	9–0	2019 AFF Women's Championship
14.	2 December 2019	Manila, Philippines	Indonesia	5–0	5–1	2019 Southeast Asian Games

== Honors ==
Thailand

- AFF Women's Championship: 2018
