= Rattikan Thongsombut =

Thai footballer (born 1991)

Personal information
- Full name: Rattikan Thongsombut
- Date of birth: 7 July 1991 (age 35)
- Place of birth: Khon Kaen, Thailand
- Height: 1.57 m (5 ft 2 in)
- Position: Midfielder

International career^{‡}
Years	Team	Apps	(Gls)
2014–	Thailand	53	(27)
- ‡ National team caps and goals as of 01:40, 12 June 2019 (UTC)

Rattikan Thongsombut (Thai: รัตติกาล ทองสมบัติ born 7 July 1991) is a Thai international footballer who plays as a midfielder for the Thailand women's national football team.

== International goals ==
No.	Date	Venue	Opponent	Score	Result	Competition
1.	21 May 2013	Bangabandhu National Stadium, Dhaka, Bangladesh	Bangladesh	1–0	9–0	2014 AFC Women's Asian Cup qualification
2.	11 September 2013	Thuwunna Stadium, Yangon, Myanmar	Jordan	2–0	4–0	2013 AFF Women's Championship
3.	5 October 2016	National Stadium, Kaohsiung, Taiwan	Chinese Taipei	2–1	5–2	Friendly
4.	15 August 2017	UM Arena Stadium, Shah Alam, Malaysia	Myanmar	1–1	3–2	2017 Southeast Asian Games
5.	15 August 2017	UM Arena Stadium, Shah Alam, Malaysia	Myanmar	2–1	3–2	2017 Southeast Asian Games
6.	22 August 2017	UM Arena Stadium, Shah Alam, Malaysia	Vietnam	1–1	1–1	2017 Southeast Asian Games
7.	24 August 2017	UM Arena Stadium, Shah Alam, Malaysia	Philippines	1–0	3–1	2017 Southeast Asian Games
8.	17 April 2018	King Abdullah II Stadium, Amman, Jordan	Australia	2–1	2–2 (a.e.t.) (1–3 p)	2018 AFC Women's Asian Cup
9.	20 April 2018	King Abdullah II Stadium, Amman, Jordan	China	1–3	1–3	2018 AFC Women's Asian Cup
10.	2 July 2018	Bumi Sriwijaya Stadium, Palembang, Indonesia	Timor-Leste	3–0	8–0	2018 AFF Women's Championship
11.	2 July 2018	Bumi Sriwijaya Stadium, Palembang, Indonesia	Timor-Leste	5–0	8–0	2018 AFF Women's Championship
12.	4 July 2018	Bumi Sriwijaya Stadium, Palembang, Indonesia	Cambodia	5–0	11–0	2018 AFF Women's Championship
13.	4 July 2018	Bumi Sriwijaya Stadium, Palembang, Indonesia	Cambodia	11–0	11–0	2018 AFF Women's Championship
14.	11 July 2018	Bumi Sriwijaya Stadium, Palembang, Indonesia	Myanmar	3–1	3–1	2018 AFF Women's Championship
15.	4 October 2018	Yongchuan Sports Center, Chongqing, China	Finland	1–2	1–3	2018 Yongchuan International Tournament
16.	27 February 2019	Antonis Papadopoulos Stadium, Larnaca, Cyprus	Hungary	1–0	4–0	2019 Cyprus Women's Cup
17.	27 February 2019	Antonis Papadopoulos Stadium, Larnaca, Cyprus	Hungary	3–0	4–0	2019 Cyprus Women's Cup
18.	17 August 2019	IPE Chonburi Stadium, Chonburi, Thailand	Singapore	2–0	8–0	2019 AFF Women's Championship
19.	21 August 2019	IPE Chonburi Stadium, Chonburi, Thailand	Philippines	2–2	4–2	2019 AFF Women's Championship
20.	25 August 2019	IPE Chonburi Stadium, Chonburi, Thailand	Myanmar	2–0	3–1	2019 AFF Women's Championship
21.	15 November 2019	Taipei Municipal Stadium, Taipei, Taiwan	Chinese Taipei	1–0	1–1	Friendly
