= Reva Octaviani =

Indonesian footballer

Personal information
- Date of birth: 8 October 2003 (age 23)
- Place of birth: Bogor, Indonesia
- Position: Midfielder

Team information
- Current team: Kelana United
- Number: 8

Senior career*
Years	Team	Apps	(Gls)
2019–2023	Persib Bandung	19	(5)
2023–2025	West Java (PON)	0	(0)
2025–	Kelana United	10	(7)

International career
2018	Indonesia U16	4	(0)
2021–	Indonesia	35	(5)
- * Club domestic league appearances and goals

Reva Octaviani (born 8 October 2003) is an Indonesian footballer who plays a midfielder for Malaysia National Women's League club Kelana United and the Indonesia national team.

== Club career ==
Octaviani has played for Asprov Jabar in Indonesia.

On 17 August 2025, it was officially announced that Reva has signed with Kelana United in Malaysia National Women's League, joining fellow Indonesian Vivi Oktavia and Sheva Imut in the squad.

== International career ==
Octaviani represented Indonesia at the 2022 AFC Women's Asian Cup.

== Career statistics ==
=== International ===
As of 20 February 2025
Indonesia score listed first, score column indicates score after each Octaviani goal

List of international goals scored by Reva Octaviani
No.	Date	Venue	Opponent	Score	Result	Competition
1	28 May 2024	Gelora Madya Stadium, Jakarta, Indonesia	Singapore	5–1	5–1	Friendly
2	2 December 2024	New Laos National Stadium, Vientiane, Laos	Singapore	2–0	3–0	2024 AFF Women's Cup
3	5 December 2024	New Laos National Stadium, Vientiane, Laos	Cambodia	1–0	3–1	2024 AFF Women's Cup
4	5 December 2024	New Laos National Stadium, Vientiane, Laos	Cambodia	3–1	3–1	2024 AFF Women's Cup
5	20 February 2025	King Abdullah Sports City, Jeddah, Saudi Arabia	Saudi Arabia	1–0	1–0	Friendly

== Honours ==
Persib Bandung

- Liga 1 Putri: 2019

Indonesia

- AFF Women's Cup: 2024

Individual

- Women's Liga 1 Best Player: 2019
- AFF Women's Cup Best Player: 2024
- AFF Women's Cup Top Goalscorer: 2024
