= Ban Cheavey =

Cambodian footballer (born 1996)

Personal information
- Date of birth: 16 May 1996 (age 30)
- Place of birth: Cambodia
- Position: Forward

Team information
- Current team: Phnom Penh Crown

Senior career*
| Years | Team | Apps | (Gls) |
| 2017– | Phnom Penh Crown | 14 | (35) |

International career
| 2018 | Cambodia | 9 | (3) |
- * Club domestic league appearances and goals

Ban Cheavey (born 16 May 1996) is a Cambodian footballer who plays as a forward for Phnom Penh Crown.

== Life and career ==
Cheavey was born on 16 May 1996 in Cambodia. She lived in an orphanage as a child. She grew up in Battambang, Cambodia. She attended the University of Health Sciences in Cambodia. She studied physical therapy. She started playing football at the age of twelve. She mainly operates as a forward. In 2017, she signed for Phnom Penh Crown. She also worked as a youth manager and physiotherapist for the club.

She has been regarded as one of their most prominent players. She helped them win their first league title. She was the top scorer of the 2021 Cambodian Women's League with thirty-five goals. She is a Cambodia international. She played for the Cambodia women's national football team at the 2021 SEA Games. However, the team was unable to reach the knockout rounds during the tournament.

== International goals ==
| No. | Date | Venue | Opponent | Score | Result | Competition |
|---|---|---|---|---|---|---|
| 1. | 30 June 2018 | Bumi Sriwijaya Stadium, Palembang, Indonesia | Timor-Leste | 2–0 | 12–0 | 2018 AFF Women's Championship |
| 2. | 30 June 2018 | Bumi Sriwijaya Stadium, Palembang, Indonesia | Timor-Leste | 5–0 | 12–0 | 2018 AFF Women's Championship |
| 3. | 30 June 2018 | Bumi Sriwijaya Stadium, Palembang, Indonesia | Timor-Leste | 7–0 | 12–0 | 2018 AFF Women's Championship |
