= Stade Auguste-Delaune =

Stadium in Reims, France

Coordinates: 49°14′48″N 4°1′30″E

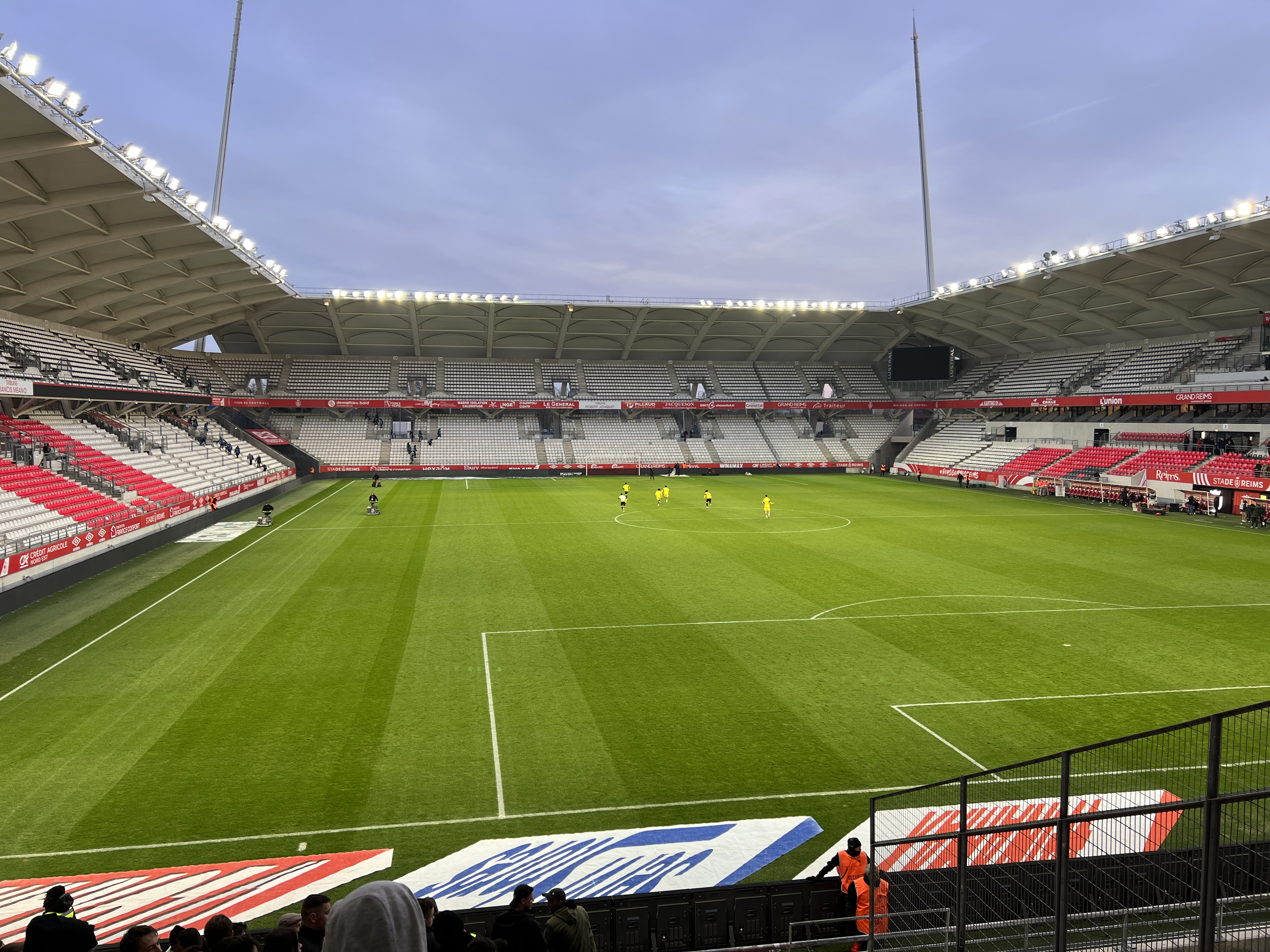
- Interactive map of Stade Auguste-Delaune
- Former names: Stade Municipal (1935–1945)
- Location: 33, Chaussée Bocquaine; 51100 Reims
- Owner: Ville de Reims
- Capacity: 21,029
- Surface: GrassMaster by Tarkett Sports
- Field size: 105 m × 68 m

Construction
- Opened: 2 June 1935; 91 years ago
- Renovated: 1955, 2004–2008
- Cost: ~60 million EUR
- Architect: Michel Rémon (2004–2008 renovation)

Tenant
- Stade de Reims (1935–present)

The Stade Auguste-Delaune (French pronunciation: [stad oɡyst dəlon]) is a multi-use stadium in Reims, France. It is used mostly for football matches and hosts the home matches of Stade Reims. The stadium was a venue for both the 1938 FIFA World Cup and the 2019 FIFA Women's World Cup.

== 1938 FIFA World Cup ==
Date	Round	Team A	Score	Team B	Attendance
5 June	Round of 16	Hungary	6–0	Dutch East Indies	9,000

== 2019 FIFA Women's World Cup ==
Date	Round	Team A	Score	Team B	Attendance
8 June	Group A	Norway	3–0	Nigeria	11,058
11 June	Group F	United States	13–0	Thailand	18,591
14 June	Group C	Jamaica	0–5	Italy	12,016
17 June	Group A	South Korea	1–2	Norway	13,034
20 June	Group E	Netherlands	2–1	Canada	19,277
24 June	Round of 16	Spain	1–2	United States	19,633

== Gallery ==
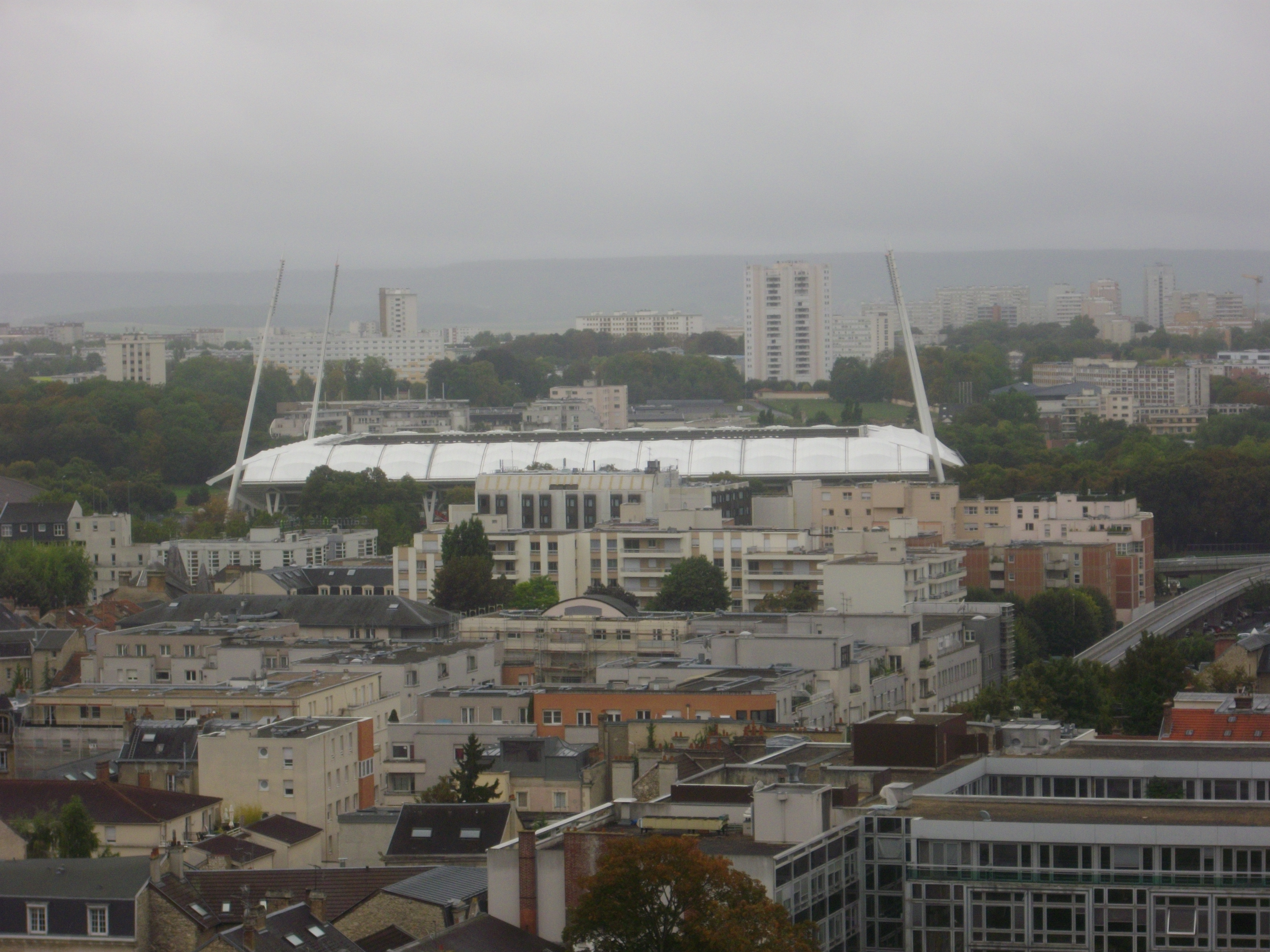
Exterior view

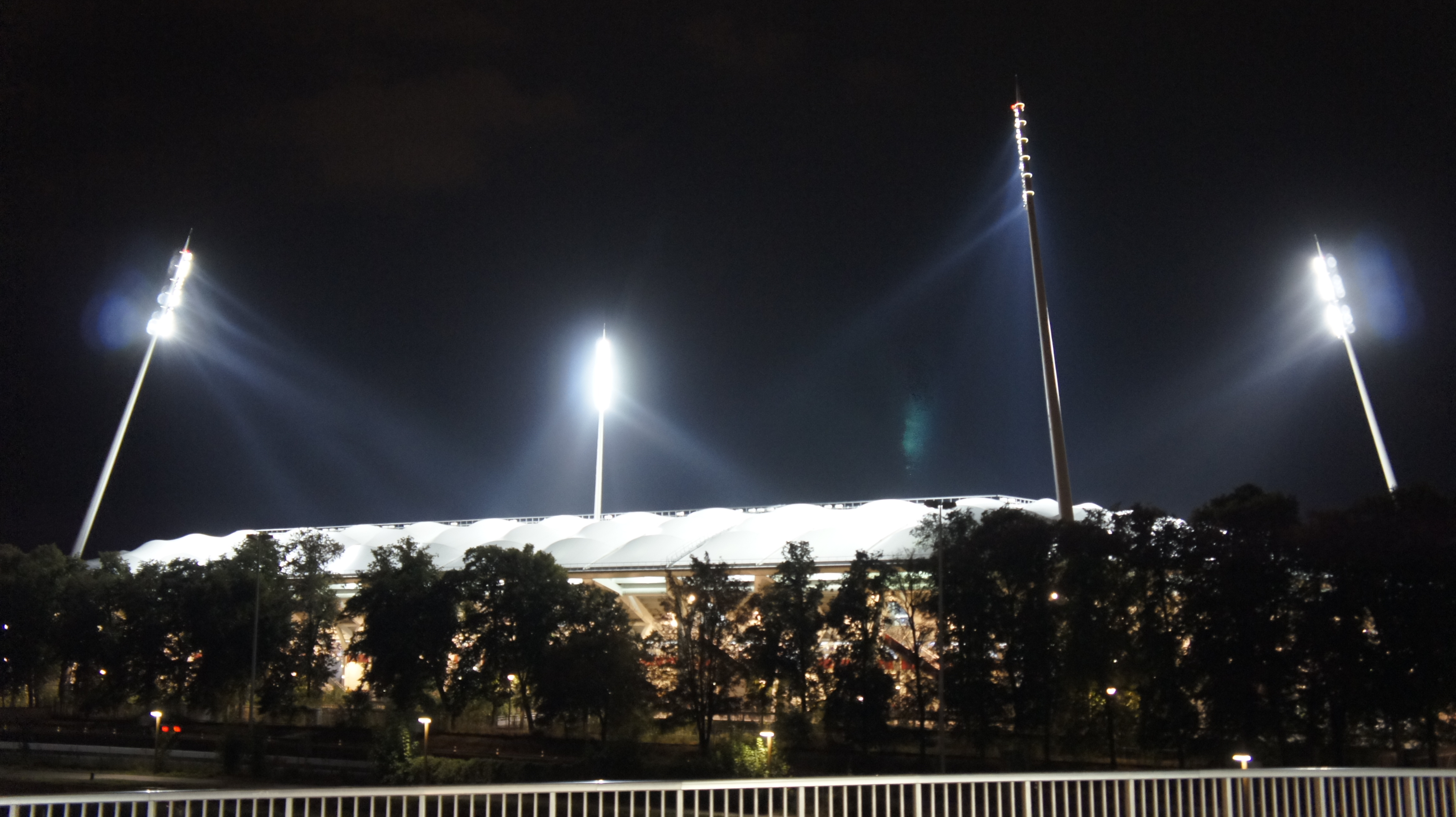
Exterior view-floodlights on

== See also ==
- List of football stadiums in France
- Lists of stadiums
