= Vivi Oktavia =

Indonesian footballer

- Vivi with Persija in 2026

Personal information
- Full name: Vivi Oktavia Riski
- Date of birth: 7 March 1997 (age 29)
- Place of birth: Mengkubang, East Belitung, Indonesia
- Height: 1.70 m (5 ft 7 in)
- Position: Centre-back

Team information
- Current team: Persija Jakarta
- Number: 17

Senior career*
Years	Team	Apps	(Gls)
2019–2023	Persib Putri	16	(0)
2023–2025	Bangka Belitung Islands	0	(0)
2025–2026	Kelana United	1	(0)
2026–	Persija Jakarta	6	(0)

International career^{‡}
2018–	Indonesia	42	(2)
- * Club domestic league appearances and goals as of 22 November 2026 ‡ National team caps and goals as of 5 July 2025

Vivi Oktavia Riski (born 7 March 1997) is an Indonesian footballer who plays as a centre-back for Indonesia Women's League club Persija Jakarta and the Indonesia national team.

== Club career ==
Vivi has played for Persib Bandung and Asprov Babel in Indonesia.

On 17 August 2025, it was officially announced that Vivi has signed with Kelana United in Malaysia National Women's League, joining fellow Indonesian Sheva Imut and Reva Octaviani in the squad.

== International career ==
Vivi represented Indonesia at the 2022 AFC Women's Asian Cup.

== International goals ==
No.	Date	Venue	Opponent	Score	Result	Competition
1.	8 November 2018	Faisal Al-Husseini International Stadium, Al-Ram, Palestine	Palestine	1–0	1–1	2020 AFC Women's Olympic Qualifying Tournament

== Honours ==
Persib Bandung

- Liga 1 Putri: 2019

Indonesia

- AFF Women's Cup: 2024
