= Sheva Imut =

Indonesian footballer

Personal information
- Full name: Sheva Imut Furyzcha
- Date of birth: 20 April 2004 (age 22)
- Place of birth: Bangka Belitung Islands, Indonesia
- Position: Attacking midfielder

Team information
- Current team: Dewa United Banten
- Number: 10

Youth career
- SSB Surabaya Bersatu
- Persebaya Surabaya

Senior career*
Years	Team	Apps	(Gls)
2019–2021	Arema	16	(10)
2021-2022	Bangka Putri	4	(6)
2023–2024	DKI Jakarta		
2025	Makati	7	(6)
2025–2026	Kelana United	1	(0)
2026	S'Amuser		
2026–	Dewa United Banten	6	(2)

International career^{‡}
2022	Indonesia U20	12	(3)
2022–	Indonesia	35	(5)
- * Club domestic league appearances and goals as of 17 March 2026 ‡ National team caps and goals as of 22 July 2026

Sheva Imut Furyzcha (born 20 April 2004) is an Indonesian footballer who plays as an attacking midfielder for Indonesia Women's League club Dewa United Banten and the Indonesia national team.

== Early life ==
Sheva Imut Furyzcha was born on 20 April 2004 in the Bangka Belitung Islands. She began her football career at the age of 7 when her mother signed her to join SSB Surabaya Bersatu, a youth football development team located in Surabaya, East Java. After spending several years in her youth, she subsequently joined the development team of Persebaya Surabaya.

== Club career ==
She commenced her professional career upon joining Arema, a rival team of her previous club, Persebaya Surabaya. Sheva played a pivotal role for Arema in the 2019 Women's Liga 1 competition, leading the club to the semi-finals. During the season, she scored 10 goals in 16 appearances, at the age of just 15.

In 2025, she joined Makati F.C. of the PFF Women's League in the Philippines.

On 17 August 2025, it was officially announced that Sheva has signed with Kelana United in Malaysia National Women's League, joining fellow Indonesian Vivi Oktavia and Reva Octaviani in the squad.

== International career ==
Sheva made her international career debut with Indonesia under-18 at the 2022 AFF U-18 Women's Championship, where she also scored her first goal in a 1–0 victory against Cambodia during the group stage on 24 July 2022.

== Personal life ==
Sheva's name is inspired by the football legend Andriy Shevchenko, who played for AC Milan. Sheva's younger sister is named Chelsea, a name chosen because Shevchenko had recently transferred to the Premier League club Chelsea at the time of her birth.

Previously, Sheva practiced pencak silat but decided to leave it, finding it too demanding, and subsequently transitioned to football.

== Career statistics ==
=== International ===
As of 14 July 2024
Indonesia score listed first, score column indicates score after each Sheva goal

List of international goals scored by Sheva Imut
No.	Date	Venue	Opponent	Score	Result	Competition
1	6 July 2022	Biñan Football Stadium, Biñan, Philippines	Malaysia	1–0	1–1	2022 AFF Women's Championship
2	14 July 2024	Hong Kong Football Club Stadium, Happy Valley, Hong Kong	Hong Kong	1–4	1–4	Friendly
3	15 April 2026	Ratchaburi Stadium, Ratchaburi, Thailand	New Caledonia	2–0	4–2	2026 FIFA Series
4	15 April 2026	Ratchaburi Stadium, Ratchaburi, Thailand	New Caledonia	3–0	4–2	2026 FIFA Series
5	16 July 2026	Kuala Lumpur Stadium, Kuala Lumpur, Malaysia	Cambodia	1–0	1–1	2026 AFF Women's Cup

== Honours ==
Indonesia

- AFF Women's Cup: 2024, 2026
