= Poeurn Kunthea =

Cambodian footballer (born 2002)

Poeurn Kunthea ពឿន គន្ធា
Personal information
- Date of birth: 21 August 2002 (age 24)
- Place of birth: Battambang, Cambodia
- Height: 1.65 m (5 ft 5 in)
- Positions: Defender; midfielder

Team information
- Current team: Phnom Penh Crown
- Number: 19

Senior career*
Years	Team	Apps	(Gls)
–2021	Battambong Academy		
2021–	Phnom Penh Crown	4	(5)

International career^{‡}
2016	Cambodia U14	1	(0)
2018–	Cambodia	21	(6)
- * Club domestic league appearances and goals ‡ National team caps and goals as of 5 December 2024

Poeurn Kunthea (Khmer: ពឿន គន្ធា; born 21 August 2002) is a Cambodian professional footballer who plays as a Defensive midfielder for Cambodian Women's League club Phnom Penh Crown and the Cambodia women's national team.

== International career ==
In June 2018, at 15 years old, Poeurn was selected for Cambodia's first-ever women's senior team to participate in the 2018 AFF Women's Championship. On 30 June 2018, she debuted as a starter in Cambodia's first-ever match against East Timor and scored her maiden international goal in the 61st minute of the game.

Throughout November and December 2024, Poeurn played a pivotal role in Cambodia's historic team that advanced to the final of the 2024 AFF Women's Cup, scoring three goals during the group stage and semi-final.

== Career statistics ==
=== International ===
As of match played 5 December 2024

Year	Cambodia	
Year	Apps	Goals
2018	2	1
2019	3	0
2022	6	1
2023	6	1
2024	4	3
Total	21	6

=== International goals ===
Scores and results list Cambodia's goal tally first, score column indicates score after each Poeurn goal.

No.	Date	Venue	Opponent	Score	Result	Competition
1.	30 June 2018	Bumi Sriwijaya Stadium, Palembang, Indonesia	Timor-Leste	9–0	12–0	2018 AFF Women's Championship
2.	5 July 2022	Biñan Football Stadium, Biñan, Philippines	Laos	1–1	1–1	2022 AFF Women's Championship
3.	6 May 2023	RSN Stadium, Phnom Penh, Cambodia	Singapore	1–0	1–0	2023 SEA Games
4.	29 November 2024	New Laos Stadium Reserve Field, Vientiane, Laos	Malaysia	1–0	2–0	2024 AFF Women's Cup
5.	2 December 2024	New Laos National Stadium, Vientiane, Laos	Timor-Leste	2–0	3–0	2024 AFF Women's Cup
6.	2 December 2024	New Laos National Stadium, Vientiane, Laos	Timor-Leste	3–0	3–0	2024 AFF Women's Cup
