= 2018 AFF Women's Championship =

Tournament details
- Host country: Indonesia
- City: Palembang
- Dates: 30 June – 13 July
- Teams: 10 (from 1 sub-confederation)
- Venue: 2 (in 1 host city)

Final positions
- Champions: Thailand (4th title)
- Runners-up: Australia U20
- Third place: Vietnam
- Fourth place: Myanmar

Tournament statistics
- Matches played: 24
- Goals scored: 154 (6.42 per match)
- Attendance: 2,600 (108 per match)
- Top scorer: (Australia) Mary Fowler (10 goals)

The 2018 AFF Women's Championship was the tenth edition of the AFF Women's Championship, an international women's football tournament organised by the ASEAN Football Federation (AFF). The tournament was hosted by Indonesia from 30 June to 13 July 2018.

The two-time defending champions Thailand won their third title in a row, and their record-extending fourth title in total, by beating Australia U20 3–2 in the final.

== Venues ==
(Indonesia) Palembang
Gelora Sriwijaya	Bumi Sriwijaya
Capacity: 23,000	Capacity: 7,000
2018 AFF Women's Championship is located in Palembang

== Group stage ==
All times listed are Indonesia Western Standard Time (UTC+07:00)

=== Group A ===
Pos	Team	Pld	W	D	L	GF	GA	GD	Pts	Qualification
1	Thailand	4	4	0	0	31	2	+29	12	Knockout stage
2	Australia U20	4	3	0	1	30	4	+26	9	Knockout stage
3	Malaysia	4	2	0	2	8	15	−7	6	
4	Cambodia	4	1	0	3	12	27	−15	3	
5	Timor-Leste	4	0	0	4	0	33	−33	0	

Source: AFF
Rules for classification: Group stage tiebreakers
30 June 2018
16:00

Malaysia	0–7	Australia U20
	Report	Chidiac 1', 49', 72'; Fowler 4', 59'; Condon 6'; Sayer 87'

Bumi Sriwijaya Stadium, Palembang
Attendance: 50
Referee: Công Thị Dung (Vietnam)
30 June 2018
19:00

Cambodia	12–0	Timor-Leste
Koemhong 11', 21', 28', 40', 58', 65'; Cheavey 14', 39', 45'; Kunthea 61'; Minea 63'; Sreyleab 70'	Report

Bumi Sriwijaya Stadium, Palembang
Attendance: 100
Referee: Abirami Naidu (Singapore)

2 July 2018
16:00

Timor-Leste	0–8	Thailand
	Report	Conceição 7' (o.g.); Kanjana 16' (pen.); Rattikan 18', 51'; Pitsamai 49', 57', 71', 80'

Bumi Sriwijaya Stadium, Palembang
Attendance: 100
Referee: Jhesa Mae Kaatz (Philippines)
2 July 2018
19:00

Cambodia	0–4	Malaysia
	Report	Norhanisa 5'; Norsuriani 58', 77'; Haindee 79'

Bumi Sriwijaya Stadium, Palembang
Attendance: 150
Referee: Bùi Thị Thu Trang (Vietnam)

4 July 2018
16:00

Thailand	11–0	Cambodia
Suchawadee 5', 8', 52', 72'; Silawan 12'; Sudarat 27' (pen.); Rattikan 33', 82'; Pitsamai 38'; Nipawan 58'; Alisa 75'	Report

Bumi Sriwijaya Stadium, Palembang
Attendance: 100
Referee: Abirami Naidu (Singapore)
4 July 2018
19:00

Australia U20	9–0	Timor-Leste
Vine 11', 18'; Tumeth 37'; Sayer 55', 65'; Cooney-Cross 59'; Phonsongkham 72'; Lowe 79'; Fowler 86'	Report

Bumi Sriwijaya Stadium, Palembang
Attendance: 100
Referee: Công Thị Dung (Vietnam)

6 July 2018
16:00

Australia U20	12–0	Cambodia
Fowler 10', 12', 18', 27', 31'; Gordon 14'; McNamara 29'; Barbieri 42', 57', 87'; Ibini 69'; Chidiac 90'	Report

Bumi Sriwijaya Stadium, Palembang
Attendance: 100
Referee: Thein Thein Aye (Myanmar)
6 July 2018
19:00

Malaysia	0–8	Thailand
	Report	Sudarat 4', 72'; Kanjana 16'; Orathai 32', 47'; Suchawadee 36'; Pitsamai 75', 90+4'

Bumi Sriwijaya Stadium, Palembang
Attendance: 150
Referee: Bùi Thị Thu Trang (Vietnam)

8 July 2018
16:00

Timor-Leste	0–4	Malaysia
	Report	Jaciah 14'; Sihaya 19'; Norsuriani 68'; Usliza 81'

Bumi Sriwijaya Stadium, Palembang
Attendance: 100
Referee: Jhesa Mae Kaatz (Philippines)
8 July 2018
19:00

Thailand	4–2	Australia U20
Silawan 50'; Kanjana 60', 62', 63'	Report	Chidiac 86' (pen.); Cooney-Cross 90+1'

Bumi Sriwijaya Stadium, Palembang
Attendance: 300
Referee: Bùi Thị Thu Trang (Vietnam)

=== Group B ===
Pos	Team	Pld	W	D	L	GF	GA	GD	Pts	Qualification
1	Vietnam	4	4	0	0	25	3	+22	12	Knockout stage
2	Myanmar	4	3	0	1	20	5	+15	9	Knockout stage
3	Philippines	4	1	1	2	6	12	−6	4	
4	Indonesia (H)	4	0	2	2	4	15	−11	2	
5	Singapore	4	0	1	3	0	20	−20	1	

Source: AFF
Rules for classification: Group stage tiebreakers
(H) Hosts
1 July 2018
16:00

Philippines	0–4	Myanmar
	Report	Naw Ar Lo Wer Phaw 2'; Khin Moe Wai 23'; Win Theingi Tun 49'; July Kyaw 59'

Jakabaring Stadium, Palembang
Attendance: 150
Referee: Rebecca Durcau (Australia)
1 July 2018
19:00

Singapore	0–0	Indonesia
	Report

Jakabaring Stadium, Palembang
Attendance: 200
Referee: Pansa Chaisanit (Thailand)

3 July 2018
16:00

Indonesia	0–6	Vietnam
	Report	Huỳnh Như 2', 52'; Nguyễn Thị Vạn 28'; Phạm Hải Yến 41'; Thái Thị Thảo 48'; Nguyễn Thị Tuyết Dung 63'

Jakabaring Stadium, Palembang
Attendance: 100
Referee: Thein Thein Aye (Myanmar)
3 July 2018
19:00

Singapore	0–3	Philippines
	Report	Semacio 6'; Umairah 60' (o.g.); Quezada 77'

Jakabaring Stadium, Palembang
Attendance: 100
Referee: Fatmawati Deliana (Indonesia)

5 July 2018
16:00

Vietnam	10–0	Singapore
Nguyễn Thị Thúy Hằng 12', 41', 70'; Hoàng Thị Loan 27'; Nguyễn Thị Tuyết Dung 31' (pen.), 34'; Nguyễn Thị Vạn 54', 66', 78'; Phạm Hoàng Quỳnh 62'	Report

Jakabaring Stadium, Palembang
Attendance: 50
Referee: Rebecca Durcau (Australia)
5 July 2018
19:00

Myanmar	6–1	Indonesia
Win Theingi Tun 4', 12', 56', 65'; Thandar Moe 24'; July Kyaw 84'	Report	Yudith 66'

Jakabaring Stadium, Palembang
Attendance: 200
Referee: Pansa Chaisanit (Thailand)

7 July 2018
16:00

Myanmar	7–0	Singapore
Yee Yee Oo 12', 22'; Nilar Win 40', 54'; Khin Moe Wai 70'; July Kyaw 76'; Khin Mo Mo Tun 89'	Report

Jakabaring Stadium, Palembang
Attendance: 100
Referee: Fatmawati Deliana (Indonesia)
7 July 2018
19:00

Philippines	0–5	Vietnam
	Report	Nguyễn Thị Vạn 1'; Huỳnh Như 12', 30'; Phạm Hoàng Quỳnh 41'; Thái Thị Thảo 78'

Jakabaring Stadium, Palembang
Attendance: 50
Referee: Rebecca Durcau (Australia)

9 July 2018
16:00

Indonesia	3–3	Philippines
Zahra 54'; Mayang 63'; Syenida 82'	Report	Inquig 9'; Semacio 14'; Quezada 90+5'

Jakabaring Stadium, Palembang
Attendance: 50
Referee: Công Thị Dung (Vietnam)
9 July 2018
19:00

Vietnam	4–3	Myanmar
Phạm Hải Yến 22', 50'; Huỳnh Như 55', 77'	Report	Win Theingi Tun 58', 87'; Khin Marlar Tun 90+3'

Jakabaring Stadium, Palembang
Attendance: 100
Referee: Fatmawati Deliana (Indonesia)

== Knockout stage ==
Semi-finals
11 July 2018 – Palembang
Thailand	3
Myanmar	1
11 July 2018 – Palembang
Vietnam	2
Australia U20	4

Final
13 July 2018 – Palembang
Thailand	3
Australia U20	2
Third place
13 July 2018 – Palembang
Myanmar	0
Vietnam	3

=== Semi-finals ===
11 July 2018
16:00

Thailand	3–1	Myanmar
Kanjana 35'; Pitsamai 52'; Rattikan 63'	Report	Khin Moe Wai 24'

Bumi Sriwijaya Stadium, Palembang
Attendance: 150
Referee: Công Thị Dung (Vietnam)
11 July 2018
16:00

Vietnam	2–4	Australia U20
Nguyễn Thị Tuyết Dung 17', 90'	Report	Chidiac 18', 76'; Nevin 35'; Cooney-Cross 65'

Jakabaring Stadium, Palembang
Attendance: 100
Referee: Abirami Naidu (Singapore)

=== Third place match ===
13 July 2018
16:00

Myanmar	0–3	Vietnam
	Report	Nguyễn Thị Tuyết Dung 10'; Nguyễn Thị Vạn 69'; Phạm Hải Yến 70'

Jakabaring Stadium, Palembang
Attendance: 100
Referee: Rebecca Durcau (Australia)

=== Final ===
13 July 2018
19:00

Thailand	3–2	Australia U20
Suchawadee 59'; Orathai 70'; Rattikan 73'	Report	Fowler 26', 58'

Jakabaring Stadium, Palembang
Attendance: 200
Referee: Thein Thein Aye (Myanmar)

== Awards ==
2018 AFF Women's Championship Champions
(Thailand)
Thailand
Fourth title

== Goalscorers ==
10 goals

- (Australia) Mary Fowler

8 goals

- (Thailand) Pitsamai Sornsai

7 goals

- (Australia) Alex Chidiac
- (Myanmar) Win Theingi Tun

6 goals

- (Cambodia) Hout Koemhong
- (Thailand) Kanjana Sungngoen
- (Thailand) Rattikan Thongsombut
- (Thailand) Suchawadee Nildhamrong
- (Vietnam) Huỳnh Như
- (Vietnam) Nguyễn Thị Tuyết Dung
- (Vietnam) Nguyễn Thị Vạn

4 goals

- (Vietnam) Phạm Hải Yến

3 goals

- (Australia) Kyra Cooney-Cross
- (Australia) MelindaJ Barbieri
- (Australia) Amy Sayer
- (Cambodia) Ban Cheavey
- (Malaysia) Norsuriani Mazli
- (Myanmar) July Kyaw
- (Myanmar) Khin Moe Wai
- (Thailand) Orathai Srimanee
- (Thailand) Sudarat Chuchuen
- (Vietnam) Nguyễn Thị Thúy Hằng

2 goals

- (Australia) Cortnee Vine
- (Myanmar) Nilar Win
- (Myanmar) Yee Yee Oo
- (Philippines) Joyce Semacio
- (Thailand) Alisa Rukpinij
- (Thailand) Silawan Intamee
- (Vietnam) Phạm Hoàng Quỳnh
- (Vietnam) Thái Thị Thảo
- (Philippines) Quinley Quezada

1 goal

- (Australia) Emily Condon
- (Australia) Bethany Gordon
- (Australia) Princess Ibini
- (Australia) Rachel Lowe
- (Australia) Holly McNamara
- (Australia) Courtney Nevin
- (Australia) Susan Phonsongkham
- (Australia) Tori Tumeth
- (Cambodia) Poeum Kunthea
- (Cambodia) Norn Minea
- (Cambodia) Chay Sreyleab
- (Indonesia) Mayang Mayang
- (Indonesia) Syenida Meryfandina
- (Indonesia) Yudith Herlina
- (Indonesia) Zahra Musdalifah
- (Malaysia) Haindee Mosroh
- (Malaysia) Jaciah Jumilis
- (Malaysia) Norhanisa Yahya
- (Malaysia) Sihaya Ajad
- (Malaysia) Usliza Usman
- (Myanmar) Khin Marlar Tun
- (Myanmar) Khin Mo Mo Tun
- (Myanmar) Naw Ar Lo Wer Phaw
- (Myanmar) Thandar Moe
- (Philippines) Kyla Inquig
- (Thailand) Nipawan Panyosuk
- (Vietnam) Hoàng Thị Loan

1 own goal

- (Singapore) Nur Umairah (against Philippines)
- (Timor-Leste) Maria Da Conceição (against Thailand)

== Final ranking ==
Pos	Team	Pld	W	D	L	GF	GA	GD	Pts	Final result
1	Thailand	6	6	0	0	37	5	+32	18	Champions
2	Australia U20	6	4	0	2	36	9	+27	12	Runners-up
3	Vietnam	6	5	0	1	30	7	+23	15	Third place
4	Myanmar	6	3	0	3	21	11	+10	9	Fourth place
5	Malaysia	4	2	0	2	8	15	−7	6	Eliminated in group stage
6	Philippines	4	1	1	2	6	12	−6	4	Eliminated in group stage
7	Cambodia	4	1	0	3	12	27	−15	3	Eliminated in group stage
8	Indonesia (H)	4	0	2	2	4	15	−11	2	Eliminated in group stage
9	Singapore	4	0	1	3	0	20	−20	1	Eliminated in group stage
10	Timor-Leste	4	0	0	4	0	33	−33	0	Eliminated in group stage

(H) Hosts
