= Putri Syaliza =

Singaporean footballer

Putri Syaliza Sazali (born 17 March 2003) is a Singaporean footballer who plays as a midfielder for the Oakland Golden Grizzlies.

== Early life and education ==
Putri was born the only daughter, the youngest child in a family of seven. Her brother, Syahrul Sazali, is a professional footballer in the Singapore Premier League.

Putri studied at Queensway Secondary School. In 2021, Putri was offered and accepted an overseas athletic scholarship to major in Sports Management from Cumberland University in Lebanon, Tennessee, United States. She later earned a two-year scholarship at Eastern Florida State College in Brevard County, Florida to complete an associate in arts degree.

== Youth career ==
At Queensway Secondary School, Putri scored scored 19 goals in five games in the Schools National girls' B Division championship. Queensway finished as the B Division champion and Putri was the top scorer.

In the C Division, Putri scored 42 goals in six games, leading Queensway to be the C Division champion and the top scorer.

=== College career ===
In 2021, Putri was due to play for Cumberland University's team, Cumberland Phoenix, in the Mid-South Conference Tournament of the National Association of Intercollegiate Athletics (NAIA). Due to matriculation issues, she was unable to play for the team. After transferring to Eastern Florida State College, she joined the college team and helped to win the college's first National Junior College Athletic Association (NJCAA) Division I National Championship.

== Club career ==
=== Warriors FC ===
In 2017, Putri joined the Warriors FC and debuted in the Football Association of Singapore (FAS) Women's Premier League. Putri was named FAS Young Player of the Year at the end of her debut season.

=== Chonburi FC ===
In 2022, Putri signed for Thai side Chonburi, becoming the first Singaporean women's footballer to play in Thailand.

== International career ==
At the age of fourteen, Putri debuted for the Singapore women's national football team when she came on as a 33rd minute substitute, where she scored during a 2–0 win over the Maldives, becoming the youngest debutant and scorer in Singaporean football.

In 2022, Putri played for Singapore in the 2022 FAS Tri-Nations Series as part of the Singapore women's national football team's preparations for the 2021 SEA Games, held in Hanoi, Vietnam in 2022. Putri played in the SEA Games for Singapore.

In 2024, Putri was selected for the national football team for the 2024 AFF Women's Cup. On 5 December, in the third-place play-off against Timor-Leste, Putri took a free kick and the ball was blocked by Timor-Leste goalkeeper Gorette de Fatima in the goal. The referee ruled that the block was after the goal line and that it was a goal. Singapore won the third-place play-off 1–0 to qualify for the 2025 Asean Women’s Championship.

== International goals ==
| No. | Date | Venue | Opponent | Score | Result | Competition | Ref. |
|---|---|---|---|---|---|---|---|
| 1. | 5 March 2018 | National Stadium, Kallang, Singapore | Maldives | 1–0 | 2–0 | Friendly | |
| 2. | 16 July 2024 | Jalan Besar Stadium, Jalan Besar, Singapore | Macau | 2–0 | 9–0 | Friendly | |
| 3. | 16 July 2024 | Jalan Besar Stadium, Jalan Besar, Singapore | Macau | 8–0 | 9–0 | Friendly | |
| 4. | 5 December 2024 | New Laos National Stadium, Vientiane, Laos | Timor-Leste | 1–0 | 1–0 | 2024 AFF Women's Cup | |

== Honours ==
- 2017: FAS Young Player of the Year
