= Vicente Ramos (footballer) =

East Timorese footballer (born 1985)

Personal information
- Full name: Vicente Ramos Freitas
- Date of birth: 28 December 1985 (age 40)
- Place of birth: Dili, Timor Timur, Indonesia
- Height: 1.69 m (5 ft 6 1/2 in)
- Position: Midfielder

Team information
- Current team: East Timor women (head coach)

Senior career*
Years	Team	Apps	(Gls)
2010–???	Ad. Dili Oeste	?	(0)

International career
2007–	Timor-Leste	5	(0)

Managerial career
- 2024–: East Timor women
- * Club domestic league appearances and goals

Vicente Ramos (born December 28, 1985), sometimes known as Entil, is an East Timorese former football player. He is the head coach for the East Timor women's national football team.

== Managerial career ==
In 2024, he coached the Timor-Leste women's team at the AFF Women's Cup. Despite the women's team only having one win in the nation's history prior to the tournament, he managed to get the team through to the semi-finals of the competition after achieving draws against Singapore and host nation Laos in the group stage. The team finished the tournament in 4th place, missing out on qualification for the 2025 ASEAN Women's Championship.
