= Hout Koemhong =

Cambodian footballer (born 1997)

Hout Koemhong (Khmer: ហួត គឹមហុង; born 12 December 1997) is a Cambodian footballer who plays as a midfielder.

== Early life and education ==
Koemhong attended Bryant & Stratton College in the United States, where she majored in network technology and then economics.

Koemhong won a National Championship with the Bobcats in 2021

She was a 1st team All-American in 2022

== Club career ==
Koemhong played for Cambodian side Phnom Penh Crown, where she was regarded as one of the club's most important players.

Koemhong played for the Rochester Lady Lancers in 2019 in the UWS.

== International career ==
Koemhong has been described as an "established figure in the national team... an icon in Cambodian women's football, with her story inspiring youngsters".

== International goals ==
No.	Date	Venue	Opponent	Score	Result	Competition
1.	30 August 2018	Bumi Sriwijaya Stadium, Palembang, Indonesia	Timor-Leste	1–0	12–0	2018 AFF Women's Championship
2.	30 August 2018	Bumi Sriwijaya Stadium, Palembang, Indonesia	Timor-Leste	3–0	12–0	2018 AFF Women's Championship
3.	30 August 2018	Bumi Sriwijaya Stadium, Palembang, Indonesia	Timor-Leste	4–0	12–0	2018 AFF Women's Championship
4.	30 August 2018	Bumi Sriwijaya Stadium, Palembang, Indonesia	Timor-Leste	6–0	12–0	2018 AFF Women's Championship
5.	30 August 2018	Bumi Sriwijaya Stadium, Palembang, Indonesia	Timor-Leste	8–0	12–0	2018 AFF Women's Championship
6.	30 August 2018	Bumi Sriwijaya Stadium, Palembang, Indonesia	Timor-Leste	11–0	12–0	2018 AFF Women's Championship

== Style of play ==
Koemhong had to adapt to a faster and more physical style of play when playing in the United States.

== Managerial career ==
Koemhong worked as a youth coach for Cambodian side Phnom Penh Crown and attended coaching courses in Japan.

== Personal life ==
Koemhong has five siblings.
