= Sukanya Chor Charoenying =

Thai women's international footballer

Personal information
- Full name: Sukanya Chor Charoenying
- Date of birth: 24 November 1987 (age 38)
- Place of birth: Ayutthaya, Thailand
- Height: 1.65 m (5 ft 5 in)
- Position: Goalkeeper

Senior career*
| Years | Team | Apps | (Gls) |
| 2014–2016 | Östersund | | |

International career^{‡}
| 2014–2020 | Thailand | 42 | (0) |
- * Club domestic league appearances and goals ‡ National team caps and goals as of 6 June 2015 (before the 2015 FIFA Women's World Cup)

Sukanya Chor Charoenying (born 24 November 1987) is a Thai women's international footballer who plays as a goalkeeper. She is a member of the Thailand women's national football team. She was part of the team at the 2015 FIFA Women's World Cup and 2019 FIFA Women's World Cup. On club level she plays for Air Force United in Thailand.
