= Rosnani Azman =

Singaporean footballer (born 1997)

Personal information
- Full name: Siti Rosnani Binte Azman
- Date of birth: 22 May 1997 (age 29)
- Height: 1.62 m (5 ft 4 in)
- Position: Defender

Team information
- Current team: FC Jurong
- Number: 50

College career
Years	Team	Apps	(Gls)
- Republic Polytechnic

Senior career*
Years	Team	Apps	(Gls)
2015–2018	Police Sport Association		
2019	Home United		
2020–2021	SWQ Thunder	31	
2021–2022	INAC Kobe Leonessa	0	(0)
2022	→ Kibi International (loan)	1	
2022	Kibi International		
2023	Hougang United		
2024-present	FC Jurong		

International career
2012-present	Singapore	57	(2)
- * Club domestic league appearances and goals

Siti Rosnani Binte Azman (born 22 May 1997) is a Singaporean professional footballer who plays as a defender for Women's Premier League club FC Jurong, as well as the Singapore women's national football team.

== Football career ==
Football was introduced to Siti Rosani when she was in 9 years old at Qihua Primary School. Rosani started playing competitive football at 11 years old. She played for the Woodlands Secondary School and Republic Polytechnic.

=== Club career ===
Rosani previously played for the South West Queensland Thunder in the National Premier Leagues Women's in Australia. She made 31 appearances for the club.

In 2021, Rosani became the first Singaporean to play professionally in Japan, when she joined INAC Kobe Leonessa of the Japan Women's Empowerment Professional Football League. Rosani struggled in INAC Kobe due to the different level of play and language barrier. In an attempt to bridge to the gap, she put in extra training and ultimately injured herself, tearing her left gluteus maximus muscle, sidelining her for two months.

Rosani requested for a loan move at the end of 2021 and after a successful trial with Kibi International of Nadeshiko League Division 2, joined Kibi International on loan from February to June 2022, until the end of her contract with INAC Kobe. In June, Rosani made her first appearance in the Japan League in a 60th minute substitution.

Kibi International signed Rosani on 1 July 2022 for another six months, after her contract with INAC Kobe ended.

She returned to Singapore at the start of 2023 and signed for Hougang United in the Deloitte Women’s Premier League (WPL).

Rosnani joins Albirex Niigata (S), currently known as FC Jurong, for the 2024 WPL season.

=== International career ===
Rosani received her first national call up for the national team in 2012. Rosani was selected in the provisional 29 players national team squad for 2023 Southeast Asian Games.. On 16 July 2024, she scored her first international goals for national team in a 9–0 victory against Macau.

Rosani earned her 50th cap when Singapore played against Lebanon on 19 July 2025.

=== International goals ===
No.	Date	Venue	Opponent	Score	Result	Competition
1.	16 July 2024	Jalan Besar Stadium, Jalan Besar, Singapore	Macau	5–0	9–0	Friendly
2.	25 November 2025	Bukit Gombak Stadium, Bukit Gombak, Singapore	Seychelles	?–0	9–0	Friendly

== Honours ==
Individual

- Women’s Premier League Player of the Year : 2017
