= Norsuriani Mazli =

Malaysian footballer

Personal information
- Full name: Norsuriani Binti Mazli
- Date of birth: 27 April 1990 (age 36)
- Place of birth: Malaysia
- Height: 1.57 m (5 ft 2 in)
- Position: Midfielder

Senior career*
| Years | Team | Apps | (Gls) |
- PDRM

International career
- Malaysia
- * Club domestic league appearances and goals

Norsuriani Mazli (born 27 April 1990) is a female Malaysian international footballer who plays as a midfielder. She is a member of the Malaysia women's national football team. She played at the 2016 AFF Women's Championship.
