= Cambodia women's national football team =

Women's national association football team representing Cambodia

Cambodia
- Association: Football Federation of Cambodia (FFC)
- Confederation: AFC (Asia)
- Sub-confederation: AFF (Southeast Asia)
- Head coach: Yasuhiro Yoshida
- Captain: Hear Sreilas
- Most caps: Poeurn Kunthea (21)
- Top scorer: Poeurn Kunthea; Hout Koemhong (6)
- FIFA code: CAM
First colours	Second colours

FIFA ranking
- Current: 113 ▲4 (16 June 2026)
- Highest: 115 (March 2024)
- Lowest: 120 (August – December 2022)

First international
- Cambodia 12–0 Timor-Leste (Palembang, Indonesia; 30 June 2018)

Biggest win
- Cambodia 12–0 Timor-Leste (Palembang, Indonesia; 30 June 2018)

Biggest defeat
- Australia U20 12–0 Cambodia (Palembang, Indonesia; 6 July 2018)

The Cambodia women's national football team (Khmer: ក្រុមបាល់ទាត់ជម្រើសជាតិនារីកម្ពុជា។) represents Cambodia in international women's football, and is controlled by the Football Federation of Cambodia (FFC). The team's first activity was in 2018, where they debuted in the AFF Women's Championship.

== History ==
Both were recruited through FIFA's Spirit of Soccer program and worked to bring the game to areas with land mines. By 2012, between Battambang or Phnom Penh, there were 400 girls playing in organised clubs. In 2009, the Com-Unity Women's Football Seminar was held Phnom Penh.

Chheun Nipha from Cambodia participated in a 2012 AFC 'C' Coaching Certificate Course organised as part of the AFC U-13 Girls' Football Tournament 2012. In 2012, the women's team participated in the Charity Cup, a competition designed to help with fundraising to send a team to compete at the Homeless World Cup. In May 2012, an under-15 women's football festival was held in Cambodia, organised by the German embassy and German Business Group Cambodia, and held at the University of Battambang.

Cambodia played their first FIFA-recognised matches in 2018 at the AFF Women's Championship. They won their first match, a 12–0 victory over Timor-Leste on 30 June 2018. They lost their other three group stages matches, all without scoring another goal. Cambodia entered the AFF Women's Championship again in 2019 and 2022. They lost all their group stage games in 2019. They fared better in 2022, defeating Timor-Leste again and drawing their match against Laos by a 1–1 score. Nevertheless, they did not advance out of the group stage. Beyond the AFF Women's Championship, Cambodia participated in the Southeast Asian Games in 2021, losing both their games and not scoring any goals. The captain of the team in their first tournament in 2018 was Hout Koemhong, who grew up in an orphanage and trained at SALT Academy for six years. The captain in 2022 was Ban Cheavey.

The team reached the women's football semifinals at the 2023 SEA Games which was hosted at home.

In 2024, Khoun Laboravy became coach in the lead up to the 2024 AFF Women's Cup and 2025 SEA Games. They ended as runners-up in the 2024 tournament held in Laos.

== Youth teams ==
=== Under-16 ===
The Cambodia women's national under-16 football team has been coached by Sam Schweingruber since it was created in 2009. The team played in their first FIFA recognised and sponsored international in spring of 2009 when they played Laos on 22 May. Two players on the 2009 under-16 team were Nin and Vesna, a pair of sisters from the SALT Academy. The sisters had been sexually exploited in Thailand but while at the Academy, they developed their skills. Nin eventually became the captain of the team.

=== Under-14 ===
Kauw was a member of the Cambodia women's national under-14 football team in 2011. The assistant coach was Chhoeurn Nipha and the head coach was Sam Schweingruber. The country participated in the AFC U-14 Girls' Festival of Football in Vietnam, where like the other ten participating countries, they fielded two teams. At the competition, Cambodia lost to the Philippines 3–0.

=== Under-13 ===
The Cambodia women's national under-13 football team competed in the June 2012 AFC Girls Football Festival against other national sides from Thailand, Myanmar, the Philippines, Guam and Vietnam. The team played their first match against the Philippines. Cambodia lost to Vietnam 0–1 in the bronze medal game. The team is coached by Sam Schweingruber.

== Results and fixtures ==
The following is a list of match results in the last 12 months, as well as any future matches that have been scheduled.

Win Draw Loss Fixture

=== 2026 ===
6 June Garuda Championship Series	Singapore	0–5	Cambodia	Bandung, Indonesia
19:00 UTC+7		Report	Hok Saody 13', 15'; Ti Samnang; Yon Yoeurn 78'; Vibol Serysitha 84'	Stadium: Arcamanik Stadium

9 June Garuda Championship Series	Indonesia	1–1	Cambodia	Bandung, Indonesia
--:-- UTC+8	Siti 54'	Report	Sapheourn 55'	Stadium: Arcamanik Stadium

13 July 2026 AFF Women's Cup GS	Cambodia	3–1	Timor-Leste	Kuala Lumpur, Malaysia
16:45 UTC+8	Sovanmony 29'; Sapheourn 36'; Serysitha 90+6'	Report	Juleica 2'	Stadium: Kuala Lumpur Stadium; Referee: Zin Mar Oo (Myanmar)

16 July 2026 AFF Women's Cup GS	Indonesia	1–1	Cambodia	Shah Alam, Malaysia
16:45 UTC+8	Sheva 40'	Report	Serysitha 47'	Stadium: UiTM Stadium; Referee: Asaka Koizumi (Japan)

19 July 2026 AFF Women's Cup SF	Cambodia	0–1	Laos	Kuala Lumpur, Malaysia
16:45 UTC+8			Anna 1'	Stadium: Kuala Lumpur Stadium

22 July 2026 AFF Women's Cup Third place match	Cambodia	1–1 (3–4 p)	Singapore	Kuala Lumpur, Malaysia
16:45 UTC+8	Vipha 70' (pen.)	Report	Tan 24'	Stadium: Kuala Lumpur Stadium; Referee: Jon Mick Pineda (Philippines)
	Penalties
	Maysam (penalty scored); Vipha (penalty scored); Serysitha (penalty missed); Samnang (penalty scored); Sovannomy (penalty missed)		(penalty scored) Mulan; (penalty missed) Li Xian; (penalty scored) Ruzi; (penalty scored) Farah; (penalty scored) Sarah

== Coaching staff ==
Position	Name
Head coach	(Japan) Yasuhiro Yoshida
Team manager	(Cambodia) Puth Thyda
Assistant coach	(Cambodia) Khoun Laboravy (Cambodia) Kim Makara
Goalkeeper coach	(Cambodia) Ravy Ly
Fitness coach	(Cambodia) Chheun Nipha
Doctor	(Cambodia) Hem Seyah
Physiotherapist	(Cambodia) Haem Somaly
Interpreter	(Cambodia) Sophea Kimleng
Kit manager	(Cambodia) Lim Chanmonyoudom
Team Staff	(Cambodia) Son Vuthy (Cambodia) Touch Phanouch

== Players ==
=== Current squad ===
The following players were named to the squad for the 2025 ASEAN Women's Championship in August 2025 .

Caps and goals are correct as of , after the match against

No.	Pos.	Player	Date of birth (age)	Caps	Goals	Club
22	GK	In Sreynech		0	0	(Football Federation of Cambodia)
23	GK	Chen Sovet	14 August 2002 (age 24)	0	0	(Football Federation of Cambodia) Visakha
1	GK	Penh Boravy	15 September 2004 (age 22)	0	0	(Football Federation of Cambodia) Visakha
5	DF	Sok Li	8 August 1996 (age 30)	1	0	(Football Federation of Cambodia) Nagaworld
	DF	Him Kanha			0	(Football Federation of Cambodia)
	DF	Meat Saphea			0	(Football Federation of Cambodia)
	DF	Vann Linda			0	(Football Federation of Cambodia)
22	DF	Hear Sreilas	11 November 2001 (age 24)	1	0	(Football Federation of Cambodia) Visakha
4	DF	Chhiv Selena	11 February 2002 (age 24)	0	0	(Canadian Soccer Association) Concordia Stingers
	DF	Ouen Sophy			0	(Football Federation of Cambodia)
2	DF	Mak Sreyroth		0	0	(Football Federation of Cambodia) Visakha
18	MF	Phoeurng Sreyphors	28 April 2001 (age 25)	0	0	(Football Federation of Cambodia) Visakha
	MF	Srun Sreyleak			0	(Football Federation of Cambodia)
23	MF	Dy Sothea	2 April 2003 (age 23)	4+	0	(Football Federation of Cambodia)
	MF	Soem Maysam			0	(Football Federation of Cambodia)
	MF	Han Sreykeo			0	(Football Federation of Cambodia)
12	MF	Hok Saody	18 March 2000 (age 26)	1	1	(Football Association of Thailand) Bangkok W.F.C.
	MF	Sea Symean			0	(Football Federation of Cambodia)
7	FW	Rith Channimol	14 March 2005 (age 21)	0	0	(Football Federation of Cambodia) Siem Reap
11	FW	Heng Sovannomy	12 December 2004 (age 21)	1	0	(Football Federation of Cambodia) Visakha
	FW	Kreun Sreybol			0	(Football Federation of Cambodia)
9	FW	Kann Sreyinch			0	(Football Federation of Cambodia)
	FW	Saom Munykanitha			0	(Football Federation of Cambodia)

=== Recent call ups ===
The following players have been called up to the Laos squad in the past 12 months.

Pos.	Player	Date of birth (age)	Caps	Goals	Club	Latest call-up

== Records ==
As of 2 March 2023

*Players in bold are still active, at least at club level.

=== Most capped players ===
#	Player	Year(s)	Caps	Goals
**1**	**Poeurn Kunthea**	2018–present	11	2

=== Top goalscorers ===
#	Player	Year(s)	Goals	Caps
1	**Hout Koemhong**	2018–present	6	3
2	**Ban Cheavey**	2018–present	3	9
3	**Poeurn Kunthea**	2018–present	2	11
3	**Yon Yoeurn**	2019–present	2	12
5	**Soeurn Vipha**	2021–present	1	6
5	**Phoeurng Sereyphor**	2019–present	1	7
5	**Keat Sivhorng**	2019–present	1	9
5	Somrit Nimol	2018–2019	1	6
5	Chay Sreyleab	2018	1	2
5	Norn Minea	2018	1	3

== Record per opponent ==
Opponent	Pld	W	D	L	GF	GA	Win% (Note: Win% is rounded to two decimal places)	Confederation
Australia U20	1	0	0	1	0	12	0.00	AFC
Guam	1	1	0	0	1	0	100.00	AFC
Hong Kong	1	0	1	0	1	1	0.00	AFC
Indonesia	6	0	4	2	4	10	0.00	AFC
Laos	3	1	1	1	3	2	33.33	AFC
Malaysia	2	1	0	1	2	4	50.00	AFC
Myanmar	3	0	0	3	1	17	0.00	AFC
Philippines	2	0	0	2	0	11	0.00	AFC
Saudi Arabia	1	1	0	0	2	1	100.00	AFC
Singapore	3	2	1	0	7	1	66.67	AFC
Thailand	4	0	0	4	0	27	0.00	AFC
Timor-Leste	4	4	0	0	21	2	100.00	AFC
Vietnam	5	0	0	5	0	30	0.00	AFC

Source: Soccerway

== Competitive record ==
=== FIFA Women's World Cup ===
FIFA Women's World Cup
Year	Result	Position	GP	W	D*	L	GF	GA	GD
(China) 1991 to (Canada) 2015	Did not exist								
(France) 2019 to (Brazil) 2027	Did not qualify								
(Costa Rica) (Jamaica) (Mexico) (United States) 2031	To be determined								
(United Kingdom) 2035	To be determined								
Total		—	—	—	—	—	—	—	—

=== Asian Games ===
Asian Games record
Host	Result	M	W	D	L	GF	GA	GD
(China) 1990 to (South Korea) 2014	Did not exist							
(Indonesia) 2018	Did not enter							
(China) 2022	Withdrew							
(Japan) 2026	Did not qualify							
(Qatar) 2030	To be determined							
(Saudi Arabia) 2034	To be determined							
Total	0/7	0	0	0	0	0	0	0

=== AFF Championship ===
Year	Round	GP	W	D	L	GF	GA
(Vietnam) 2004 to (Myanmar) 2016	Did not enter						
(Indonesia) 2018	Group stage	4	1	0	3	12	27
(Thailand) 2019	Group stage	3	0	0	3	1	24
(Philippines) 2022	Group stage	4	1	1	2	4	8
(Vietnam) 2025	Group stage	3	0	1	2	1	14
2027	Did not qualify						
Total	Best: Group stage	14	2	2	10	18	73

=== AFF Cup ===
Year	Round	GP	W	D	L	GF	GA
(Laos) 2024	**Runners-up**	4	2	1	1	6	3
(Malaysia) 2026	Fourth place	4	1	2	1	5	4
Total	Best: Runners-up	8	3	3	2	11	7

=== Southeast Asian Games ===
Year	Round	GP	W	D	L	GF	GA
(Thailand) 1985 to (Philippines) 2019	Did not enter						
(Vietnam) 2021	Group stage	2	0	0	2	0	12
(Cambodia) 2023	**Fourth place**	5	2	0	3	3	13
(Thailand) 2025	Withdrew						
Total	Best: Fourth place	7	2	0	5	3	25

Source: Soccerway

== Honours ==
=== Regional ===
- **AFF Women's Cup**
  - Runners-up: 2024
  - Forty Place:2026

=== Friendly ===
- **Garuda Championship Series**
  - Champions: 2026

== See also ==
- Cambodia national football team
