= Timor-Leste women's national football team =

Timor-Leste
- Association: Federação de Futebol de Timor-Leste
- Confederation: AFC (Asia)
- Sub-confederation: AFF (Southeast Asia)
- Head coach: Emral Bustamam
- Captain: Maria de Conceicao
- Most caps: Luselia Fernandes; Maria de Conceicao (8)
- Top scorer: Nilda dos Reis; Godelivia Martin; Luselia Fernandes; Dolores Costa; Brigida da Costa (1)
- FIFA code: TLS
First colours	Second colours

FIFA ranking
- Current: 158 ▼1 (16 June 2026)
- Highest: 152 (August 2022)
- Lowest: 159 (December 2023 – March 2025)

First international
- Myanmar 17–0 Timor-Leste (Mandalay, Myanmar; 27 July 2016)

Biggest win
- Timor-Leste 3–1 Mongolia (Chiang Mai, Thailand; 5 July 2025)

Biggest defeat
- Australia U20 20–0 Timor-Leste (Mandalay, Myanmar; 29 July 2016)

AFF Championship
- Appearances: 4 (first in 2016)
- Best result: Group Stage (2016, 2018, 2019, 2022)

The Timor-Leste women's national football team (Portuguese: Seleção Timorense de Futebol Feminino) represents Timor-Leste (formerly East Timor) in international women's association football and is governed by Federação de Futebol de Timor-Leste (FFTL).

== History ==
In 2005, the country was one of seven teams that included Brunei, Thailand, Indonesia, Timor-Leste, Malaysia, Cambodia, Laos, Vietnam, Burma and Singapore, that were expected to field a women's football team to compete at the Southeast Asian Games in Marikina in December.

In March 2012, the team was not ranked in the world by FIFA.

The FIFA trigramme is TLS.

=== First participations ===
The first match ever recorded by Timor-Leste was against Myanmar. The game was held in Mandalay on 27 July 2016 and Timor-Leste lost 0–17.

In 2016, Timor-Leste participated in their first AFF Women's Championship, held in Myanmar between 26 July and 4 August 2016. The squad lost all their matches, being eliminated from the competition.

=== First international victory ===
On 15 August 2019, Timor-Leste won their first international match against Singapore with a score of 2–1. Luselia made history as the first player to score a goal for Timor-Leste, she scored against Singapore in the 59th minute which gave Timor-Leste a 1–0 lead over Singapore in the first match of Timor-Leste in the 2019 AFF Women's Championship.

== Results and fixtures ==
=== 2026 ===
10 July 2026 AFF Women's Cup GS	Timor-Leste	0–2	Indonesia	Kuala Lumpur, Malaysia
16:45 UTC+8		Report	Nahon 5'; Loupatty 28'	Stadium: Kuala Lumpur Stadium; Referee: Pansa Chaisanit (Thailand)

13 July 2026 AFF Women's Cup GS	Cambodia	3–1	Timor-Leste	Kuala Lumpur, Malaysia
16:45 UTC+8	Sovanmony 29'; Sapheourn 36'; Serysitha 90+6'	Report	Juleica 2'	Stadium: Kuala Lumpur Stadium; Referee: Zin Mar Oo (Myanmar)

== Players ==
=== Current squad ===
The following 23 players were called up for the 2025 ASEAN Women's Championship taking place in August 2025.

No.	Pos.	Player	Date of birth (age)	Club
1	GK	Madalena Soares	13 May 2001 (age 25)	(East Timor Football Federation) S'Amuser FC
12	GK	Gorette da Costa	31 May 2004 (age 22)	(East Timor Football Federation) Buibere FC
20	GK	Maria Bossa	25 July 2004 (age 22)	
2	DF	Maria da Conceição	2 January 1997 (age 29)	(East Timor Football Federation) AD SLB Laulara
3	DF	Júlia Belo	10 August 1997 (age 29)	(East Timor Football Federation) AD SLB Laulara
4	DF	Idália Belo	21 May 1999 (age 27)	(East Timor Football Federation) AD SLB Laulara
5	DF	Brigida da Costa	5 June 2000 (age 26)	(East Timor Football Federation) Maranatha FC
6	DF	Godelivia Martins	7 December 1998 (age 27)	(East Timor Football Federation) S'Amuser FC
13	DF	Grace Sim	25 May 2001 (age 25)	
14	DF	Tasia Canizio	31 October 2004 (age 22)	(East Timor Football Federation) Buibere FC
15	DF	Noemia Fernandes	3 September 2003 (age 23)	
8	MF	Sonia Amaral	5 February 1997 (age 29)	(East Timor Football Federation) AD SLB Laulara
10	MF	Vanessa Fernandes	11 February 1998 (age 28)	(East Timor Football Federation) AD SLB Laulara
16	MF	Natalia Lawa	28 November 1999 (age 26)	
18	MF	Astari Songge	30 April 2000 (age 26)	(East Timor Football Federation) AD SLB Laulara
21	MF	Letizia Soares	14 June 2004 (age 22)	(East Timor Football Federation) S'Amuser FC
7	FW	Dolores Costa	31 January 1991 (age 35)	(East Timor Football Federation) S'Amuser FC
9	FW	Jessica Soares	17 April 1999 (age 27)	
11	FW	Marcia Chaves	17 October 1988 (age 38)	(East Timor Football Federation) Buibere FC
17	FW	Gradiana Avelina	28 June 2000 (age 26)	
19	FW	Angela da Cruz	28 November 2000 (age 25)	
22	FW	Elvira da Silva	25 August 1997 (age 29)	(East Timor Football Federation) AD SLB Laulara
23	FW	Isabelita da Silva	3 October 2003 (age 23)	

=== Recent call-ups ===
The following players have also been called up to the squad within the past 12 months.

Pos.	Player	Date of birth (age)	Caps	Goals	Club	Latest call-up

=== Previous squads ===
- 2016 AFF Women's Championship squad
- 2018 AFF Women's Championship squad
- 2019 AFF Women's Championship squad

== Competitive Record ==
=== World Cup ===
FIFA Women's World Cup									Qualification					
Year	Result	Position	Pld	W	D*	L	GF	GA	Pld	W	D	L	GF	GA
(China) 1991	Part of Indonesia								Part of Indonesia					
(Sweden) 1995	Part of Indonesia								Part of Indonesia					
(United States) 1999	Did not exist, under United Nations								Did not exist, under United Nations					
(United States) 2003	Not a member of FIFA								Not a member of FIFA					
(China) 2007	Did not enter								Did not enter					
(Germany) 2011	Did not enter								Did not enter					
(Canada) 2015	Did not enter								Did not enter					
(France) 2019	Did not enter								Did not enter					
(Australia) (New Zealand) 2023	Did not enter								Did not enter					
(Brazil) 2027	Did not qualify								To be determined					
(Costa Rica) (Jamaica) (Mexico) (United States) 2031	To be determined								To be determined					
(United Kingdom) 2035	To be determined								To be determined					
Total	–	0/12	–	–	–	–	–	–	–	–	–	–	–	–

=== Summer Olympic Games ===
Summer Olympics record
Year	Result	Position	Pld	W	D	L	GF	GA
(United States) 1996	Part of Indonesia							
(Australia) 2000	Part of Indonesia							
(Greece) 2004	Did Not Enter							
(China) 2008	Did Not Enter							
(United Kingdom) 2012	Did Not Enter							
(Brazil) 2016	Did Not Enter							
(Japan) 2020	Did Not Enter							
(France) 2024	Did Not Enter							
(United States) 2028	Did Not Qualify							
Total	–	0/8	–	–	–	–	–	–

=== AFC Women's Asian Cup ===
AFC Women's Asian Cup record
Year	Result	Position	GP	W	D*	L	GS	GA	GD
(Hong Kong) 1975	Part of Indonesia								
(Taiwan) 1977	Part of Indonesia								
(India) 1979	Part of Indonesia								
(Hong Kong) 1981	Part of Indonesia								
(Thailand) 1983	Part of Indonesia								
(Hong Kong) 1986	Part of Indonesia								
(Hong Kong) 1989	Part of Indonesia								
(Japan) 1991	Part of Indonesia								
(Malaysia) 1993	Part of Indonesia								
(Malaysia) 1995	Part of Indonesia								
(China) 1997	Part of Indonesia								
(Philippines) 1999	Did not exist, under United Nations								
(Chinese Taipei) 2001	Did not exist, under United Nations								
(Thailand) 2003	Did not enter								
(Australia) 2006	Did not enter								
(Vietnam) 2008	Did not enter								
(China) 2010	Did not enter								
(Vietnam) 2014	Did not enter								
(Jordan) 2018	Did not enter								
(India) 2022	Did not enter								
(Australia) 2026	Did not qualify								
Total	–	0/20	—	—	—	—	—	—	—

=== Asian Games ===
Asian Games record
Year	Result	Position	GP	W	D*	L	GS	GA	GD
(China) 1990	Part of Indonesia								
(Japan) 1994	Part of Indonesia								
(Thailand) 1998	Part of Indonesia								
(South Korea) 2002	Did not enter								
(Qatar) 2006	Did not enter								
(China) 2010	Did not enter								
(South Korea) 2014	Did not enter								
(Indonesia) 2018	Did not enter								
(China) 2022	To be determined								
(Japan) 2026	To be determined								
Total	0/8	—	—	—	—	—	—	—	

=== ASEAN Women's Championship ===
ASEAN Women's Championship
Year	Result	Position	Pld	W	D	L	GF	GA
(Vietnam) 2004	Did Not Enter							
(Vietnam) 2006	Did Not Enter							
(Myanmar) 2007	Did Not Enter							
(Vietnam) 2008	Did Not Enter							
(Laos) 2011	Did Not Enter							
(Vietnam) 2012	Did Not Enter							
(Myanmar) 2013	Did Not Enter							
(Vietnam) 2015	Did Not Enter							
(Myanmar) 2016	Group stage	8th	3	0	0	3	0	50
(Indonesia) 2018	Group stage	10th	4	0	0	4	0	33
(Thailand) 2019	Group stage	7th	4	1	0	3	2	22
(Philippines) 2022	Group stage	11th	4	0	0	4	1	18
(Vietnam) 2025	Group stage	8th	3	0	0	3	0	19
Total	Group stage	4/12	15	1	0	14	3	123

=== South East Asian Games ===
SEA Games women's tournament
Year	Result	Pld	W	D	L	GF	GA
2001–2023	Did Not Enter						
Total	N/A	0	0	0	0	0	0

== Head-to-head record ==
Positive Record Neutral Record Negative Record As of 13 July 2026

Team	Pld	W	D	L	GF	GA	Win% (Note: Win% is rounded to two decimal places)	Confederation
Bhutan	1	0	0	1	1	3	0.00	AFC
Cambodia	4	0	0	4	2	21	0.00	AFC
India	1	0	0	1	0	4	0.00	AFC
Indonesia	1	0	0	1	0	4	0.00	AFC
Iraq	1	0	1	0	0	0	0.00	AFC
Jordan	1	0	0	1	1	3	0.00	AFC
Laos	2	0	1	1	0	2	0.00	AFC
Malaysia	3	0	0	3	0	22	0.00	AFC
Mongolia	1	1	0	0	3	1	100.00	AFC
Myanmar	3	0	0	3	0	27	0.00	AFC
Philippines	2	0	0	2	0	14	0.00	AFC
Singapore	3	1	1	1	3	3	33.33	AFC
Thailand	4	0	0	4	0	25	0.00	AFC
Uzbekistan	1	0	0	1	0	3	0.00	AFC
Vietnam	1	0	0	1	0	6	0.00	AFC
Total (15 nations)	28	2	3	23	9	135	7.14%	–

== Player records ==
As of 21 August 2019
Players in bold are still active with Timor-Leste.

=== Most capped players ===
Rank	Name	Caps	Goals	Career
1	Maria de Conceicao	8	0	2016–2019
1	Luselia Fernandes	8	1	2016–2019
3	Femania Babo	7	0	2016–2019
3	Sonia Amaral	7	0	2016–2019
3	Godelvia Martins	7	0	2016–2019
3	Natalia da Costa	7	0	2016–2019
3	Elvira Ana da Silva	7	0	2018–2019
8	Julia Freitas Belo	6	0	2016–2019
8	Agostinha Noguera	6	0	2016–2019
8	Nilda dos Reis	6	0	2016–2019
8	Rosa da Costa	6	0	2016–2019

=== Top goalscorers ===
Rank	Name	Goals	Caps	Ratio	Career
1	Dolores Costa	1	3	0.33	2019
1	Luselia Fernandes	1	8	0.13	2016–2019

Youngest debut record
#	Player	Age	Debut date	Opponent	Tournament
1.	Inacia dos Anjos	16 years 222 days	27 July 2016	Myanmar	2016 AFF Women's Championship
2.	Natacha Sarmento	17 years 221 days	31 July 2016	Malaysia	2016 AFF Women's Championship
3.	Godelivia Martins	17 years 319 days	27 July 2016	Myanmar	2016 AFF Women's Championship

== Current staff ==
As of November 2024

Position	Name
Technical director	(Timor-Leste) Paulo Mesquita
Head coach	(Indonesia) Emral Bustamam
Assistant coach	(Timor-Leste) Miro Baldo Bento
Goalkeeping coach	(Timor-Leste) Derson Gusmão
Physiotherapist	(Timor-Leste) Olisio Dos Santos Sarmento
Media Officer	(Timor-Leste) Maria Da Costa
Administrator	(Timor-Leste) Suzana Cesario
Official	(Timor-Leste) Sofia Marian Marques
Kit manager	(Timor-Leste) Juda Fernandes

=== Coaching history ===
Coach	Period	Pld	W	D	L
(Brazil) Gelasio da Silva Carvalho	2016–2017	3	0	0	3
(South Korea) Lee Min Young	2018–20??	8	1	0	7
(South Korea) Kim Shinhwan	2023–20??				
(Timor-Leste) Vicente Ramos Freitas	2024–2025				
(Chile) Simón Elissetche	2025–Present				
