= Football at the 2017 SEA Games – Women's team squads =

Below are the squads for the Football at the 2017 SEA Games - women's tournament, hosted by Malaysia, which took place between 14 and 29 August 2017.

== Round-robin ==
=== Malaysia ===
Manager: Mohd Asyraaf Fong Abdullah

#	Position	Player	Date of birth (age)
2	MF	Masturah Majid	5 February 1990 (aged 27)
3	DF	Mira Fazliana Aidi	22 September 1993 (aged 23)
4	MF	Shereilynn Elly	20 August 1991 (aged 25)
5	DF	Nur Athirah Farhanah	5 July 1999 (aged 18)
7	MF	Jaciah Jumilis	23 July 1991 (aged 26)
8	DF	Eslilah Esar	18 July 1989 (aged 28)
9	DF	Usliza Usman	20 May 1995 (aged 22)
10	MF	Norsuriani Mazli	27 April 1990 (aged 27)
11	FW	Puteri Noralisa Wilkinson	10 November 1995 (aged 21)
12	MF	Angela Kais	7 September 1980 (aged 36)
13	FW	Nur Haniza Saarani	26 May 1996 (aged 21)
15	FW	Ji Fedalliah	28 August 1996 (aged 20)
16	MF	Nor Athirah Mamat	13 August 2001 (aged 16)
17	DF	Malini Nordin	29 December 1985 (aged 31)
18	DF	Norshahira Suhaime	6 April 2001 (aged 16)
19	FW	Dadree Rofinus	7 January 1990 (aged 27)
20	GK	Asma Junaidi	18 November 1992 (aged 24)
21	GK	Roszaini Bakar	17 October 1990 (aged 26)
22	MF	Haindee Mosroh	17 April 1993 (aged 24)
23	GK	Nurul Azurin Mazlan	27 January 2000 (aged 17)

=== Myanmar ===
Manager: (Netherlands) Reijners Roger Johannes Joseph Hubertus

#	Position	Player	Date of birth (age)
1	GK	Mya Phu Ngon	10 August 1989 (aged 28)
2	DF	Khin Than Wai	2 November 1995 (aged 21)
3	DF	Zin Mar Win	2 January 1990 (aged 27)
4	DF	Wai Wai Aung	5 October 1993 (aged 23)
5	DF	Phu Pwint Khaing	23 July 1987 (aged 30)
6	DF	San San Maw	5 October 1980 (aged 36)
7	FW	Win Theingi Tun	1 February 1995 (aged 22)
8	MF	Naw Ar Lo Wer Phaw	11 January 1988 (aged 29)
9	FW	Yee Yee Oo	1 August 1990 (aged 27)
10	MF	Khin Marlar Tun	21 May 1988 (aged 29)
11	FW	Khin Moe Wai	16 December 1989 (aged 27)
12	MF	Le Le Hlaing	24 March 1997 (aged 20)
13	MF	Than Than Htwe	24 July 1986 (aged 31)
14	MF	May Sabai Phoo	31 July 1996 (aged 21)
15	FW	Nu Nu	1 April 1999 (aged 18)
16	FW	July Kyaw	21 July 1999 (aged 18)
17	FW	Khin Mo Mo Tun	3 June 1999 (aged 18)
18	GK	Zar Zar Myint	5 June 1993 (aged 24)
19	DF	Ei Yadanar Phyo	4 January 1998 (aged 19)
20	DF	Chit Chit	18 October 1996 (aged 20)

=== Philippines ===
Manager: Marnelli Dimzon

#	Position	Player	Date of birth (age)
1	GK	Inna Palacios	8 February 1994 (aged 23)
5	DF	Hali Long	21 January 1995 (aged 22)
7	MF	Camille Rodriguez	27 December 1994 (aged 22)
8	DF	Alesa Dolino	26 October 1992 (aged 24)
9	MF	Anicka Castañeda	15 December 1999 (aged 17)
10	FW	Kyrhen Dimaandal	16 October 1996 (aged 20)
11	MF	Irish Navaja	12 May 1997 (aged 20)
12	MF	Jovelle Sudaria	11 November 1996 (aged 20)
13	DF	Patricia Tomanon	10 April 1994 (aged 23)
14	DF	Mea Bernal	24 November 1989 (aged 27)
16	FW	Charisa Lemoran	21 September 1998 (aged 18)
17	MF	Kyla Inquig	24 January 1997 (aged 20)
18	GK	Faith Ruetas	3 July 2001 (aged 16)
19	DF	Eva Madarang	13 September 1997 (aged 19)
20	FW	Alisha del Campo	20 September 1999 (aged 17)
22	GK	Hazel Arce	15 June 1997 (aged 20)
24	DF	Patrice Impelido	9 October 1987 (aged 29)
27	DF	Joanna Almeda	24 September 1999 (aged 17)
28	DF	Mary Duran	28 March 1997 (aged 20)
29	MF	Sara Castañeda	5 December 1996 (aged 20)

=== Thailand ===
Manager: (England) Spencer Prior

#	Position	Player	Date of birth (age)
1	GK	Waraporn Boonsing	16 February 1990 (aged 27)
3	DF	Natthakarn Chinwong	15 March 1992 (aged 25)
4	DF	Duangnapa Sritala	4 February 1986 (aged 31)
5	DF	Ainon Phancha	26 January 1992 (aged 25)
6	MF	Pikul Khueanpet	20 September 1988 (aged 28)
7	MF	Silawan Intamee	22 January 1994 (aged 23)
8	MF	Naphat Seesraum	11 May 1987 (aged 30)
9	DF	Warunee Phetwiset	13 December 1990 (aged 26)
10	DF	Sunisa Srangthaisong	6 May 1988 (aged 29)
11	FW	Alisa Rukpinij	2 February 1995 (aged 22)
12	MF	Rattikan Thongsombut	7 July 1991 (aged 26)
13	MF	Orathai Srimanee	12 June 1988 (aged 29)
15	MF	Nipawan Panyosuk	15 March 1995 (aged 22)
16	DF	Khwanrudi Saengchan	16 May 1991 (aged 26)
17	FW	Taneekarn Dangda	15 December 1992 (aged 24)
18	GK	Yada Sengyong	10 September 1993 (aged 23)
19	DF	Pitsamai Sornsai	19 January 1989 (aged 28)
21	FW	Kanjana Sungngoen	21 September 1986 (aged 30)
23	FW	Nisa Romyen	18 January 1990 (aged 27)
26	FW	Saowalak Pengngam	30 November 1996 (aged 20)

=== Vietnam ===
Manager: Mai Duc Chung

#	Position	Player	Date of birth (age)
1	GK	Đặng Thị Kiều Trinh	19 December 1985 (aged 31)
2	DF	Nguyễn Thị Xuyến	6 September 1987 (aged 29)
3	DF	Chương Thị Kiều	19 August 1995 (aged 21)
4	DF	Vũ Thị Thúy	8 August 1994 (aged 23)
5	DF	Bùi Thị Như	16 June 1990 (aged 27)
6	MF	Vũ Thị Nhung	9 July 1992 (aged 25)
7	MF	Nguyễn Thị Tuyết Dung	13 December 1993 (aged 23)
8	MF	Nguyễn Thị Liễu	18 September 1992 (aged 24)
9	MF	Trần Thị Thùy Trang	8 August 1988 (aged 29)
11	FW	Nguyễn Thị Nguyệt	5 November 1992 (aged 24)
12	FW	Phạm Hải Yến	9 November 1994 (aged 22)
13	MF	Nguyễn Thị Muôn	7 October 1988 (aged 28)
14	GK	Trần Thị Kim Thanh	18 September 1993 (aged 23)
16	MF	Nguyễn Thị Bích Thùy	1 May 1994 (aged 23)
17	DF	Nguyễn Hải Hòa	22 December 1989 (aged 27)
18	MF	Nguyễn Thị Vạn	10 January 1997 (aged 20)
19	DF	Huỳnh Như	28 November 1991 (aged 25)
21	DF	Bùi Thúy An	5 October 1990 (aged 26)
23	GK	Nguyễn Thị Thanh Hảo	9 August 1985 (aged 32)
26	DF	Trần Thị Hồng Nhung	28 October 1992 (aged 24)
