= Football at the 2017 SEA Games =

Tournament details
- Host country: Malaysia
- Dates: 14–29 August
- Teams: 11 (men) + 5 (women) (from 1 sub-confederation)
- Venue: 4 (in 3 host cities)

Final positions
- Champions: Thailand (men; 16th title) (Note: This is the 1st title of Thailand U-22 at the SEA Games. However, SEA Games Federation considers Thailand as the successor team of the Thailand senior team and Thailand U-23 who themselves win 15 titles.); Vietnam (women; 5th title)
- Runners-up: Malaysia (men); Thailand (women)
- Third place: Indonesia (men); Myanmar (women)
- Fourth place: Myanmar (men); Philippines (women)

Tournament statistics
- Matches played: 39
- Goals scored: 119 (3.05 per match)
- Top scorer(s): (Malaysia) Thanabalan Nadarajah (Myanmar) Aung Thu (Vietnam) Nguyễn Công Phượng (men; 4 goals each) (Myanmar) Win Theingi Tun (women; 6 goals)

The football tournament at the 2017 SEA Games was in Malasia. Matches were played in Kuala Lumpur, Shah Alam, and Selayang.

Associations affiliated with FIFA might send teams to participate in the tournament. Men's teams were restricted to under-22 players (born on or after 1 January 1995) with a maximum of three overage players allowed, while there were no age restrictions on women's teams.

In the men's tournament, Thailand defended, winning their third straight and record-extending sixteenth SEA Games men's gold medal in the tournament by beating Malaysia with a score 1–0, while Indonesia got bronze for the fourth time after beating Myanmar with a score 3–1. Meanwhile, in the women's tournament, Vietnam pipped Thailand for their record-tying fifth SEA Games women's gold medal after they scored a 6–0 win over Malaysia in a round-robin format that subsequently gave them a superior goal difference. Myanmar defended the bronze after losing to the two favourites: Vietnam and Thailand.

== Competition schedule ==
The following was the competition schedule for the football competitions:

G	Group stage	½	Semifinals	B	3rd place play-off	F	Final

Event	Mon 14	Tue 15	Wed 16	Thu 17	Fri 18	Sat 19	Sun 20	Mon 21	Tue 22	Wed 23	Thu 24	Fri 25	Sat 26	Sun 27	Mon 28	Tue 29	
Men	G	G	G	G	G		G	G	G	G	G		½			B	F
Women		G		G			G		G		G						

== Venues ==
Four venues in three cities were used in the tournament.

Kuala Lumpur	Selayang
UM Arena Stadium	Selayang Municipal Council Stadium
Capacity: 1,000	Capacity: 16,000
UM Arena Stadium	

Shah Alam
Shah Alam Stadium	UiTM Stadium
Capacity: 80,372	Capacity: 6,000
Shah Alam Stadium	

The Kuala Lumpur Football Stadium was one of the original venue for the football tournament, until it was replaced by Selayang Stadium in July 2017 due to unsatisfactory conditions in the stadium renovations. The Bukit Jalil National Stadium were also originally planned for the men's football final matches before it was changed to Shah Alam Stadium due to several factors.

== Participating nations ==
=== Men's tournament ===
- Brunei
- Cambodia
- Indonesia
- Laos
- Malaysia
- Myanmar
- Philippines
- Singapore
- Thailand
- Timor-Leste
- Vietnam

=== Women's tournament ===
- Malaysia
- Myanmar
- Philippines
- Thailand
- Vietnam

== Men's competition ==
=== Group stage ===
==== Group A ====
Pos	Team	Pld	W	D	L	GF	GA	GD	Pts	Qualification
1	Malaysia (H)	4	4	0	0	10	4	+6	12	Semi-finals
2	Myanmar	4	3	0	1	12	4	+8	9	Semi-finals
3	Singapore	4	2	0	2	4	4	0	6	
4	Laos	4	1	0	3	5	8	−3	3	
5	Brunei	4	0	0	4	1	12	−11	0	

Updated to match(es) played on 23 August 2017. Source: KL2017 Official Website
Rules for classification: 1) Points; 2) Goal difference; 3) Goals scored
(H) Hosts

==== Group B ====
Pos	Team	Pld	W	D	L	GF	GA	GD	Pts	Qualification
1	Thailand	5	4	1	0	10	1	+9	13	Semi-finals
2	Indonesia	5	3	2	0	7	1	+6	11	Semi-finals
3	Vietnam	5	3	1	1	12	4	+8	10	
4	Philippines	5	2	0	3	4	10	−6	6	
5	Timor-Leste	5	1	0	4	2	8	−6	3	
6	Cambodia	5	0	0	5	1	12	−11	0	

Updated to match(es) played on 24 August 2017. Source: KL2017 Official Website
Rules for classification: 1) Points; 2) Goal difference; 3) Goals scored

=== Knockout stage ===
Semi-finals
26 August – Shah Alam
Malaysia	1
Indonesia	0
26 August – Selayang
Thailand	1
Myanmar	0

Gold medal match
29 August – Shah Alam
Malaysia	0
Thailand	1
Bronze medal match
29 August – Selayang
Indonesia	3
Myanmar	1

== Women's competition ==
Pos	Team	Pld	W	D	L	GF	GA	GD	Pts	Final Result
1	Vietnam	4	3	1	0	13	2	+11	10	Gold medal
2	Thailand	4	3	1	0	13	4	+9	10	Silver medal
3	Myanmar	4	2	0	2	14	6	+8	6	Bronze medal
4	Philippines	4	1	0	3	3	13	−10	3	
5	Malaysia (H)	4	0	0	4	1	19	−18	0	

Source: Schedule
Rules for classification: 1) Points; 2) Goal difference; 3) Goals scored; More: Technical Handbook
(H) Hosts

== Medal summary ==
=== Medal table ===
Host nation

Rank	Nation	Gold	Silver	Bronze	Total
1	Thailand (THA)	1	1	0	2
2	Vietnam (VIE)	1	0	0	1
3	Malaysia (MAS)*	0	1	0	1
4	Indonesia (INA)	0	0	1	1
4	Myanmar (MYA)	0	0	1	1
Totals (5 entries)		2	2	2	6

=== Medalists ===
Event	Gold	Silver	Bronze
Men's tournament	Thailand (THA); Anusith Termmee; Sasalak Haiprakhon; Suriya Singmui; Worawut Namvech; Shinnaphat Lee-Oh; Chaowat Veerachat; Nattawut Sombatyotha; Nopphon Ponkam; Chenrop Samphaodi; Chaiyawat Buran; Kevin Deeromram; Peerawat Akkatam; Picha U-Tra; Montree Promsawat; Saringkan Promsupa; Phitiwat Sukjitthammakul; Ratthanakorn Maikami; Worachit Kanitsribampen; Sittichok Kannoo; Nont Muangngam	Malaysia (MAS); Norman Haikal Rendra Iskandar; Mohammad Iqbal Ali; Syazwan Zaipol Bahari; Adib Zainuddin; Muhd Syahmi Safari; Safawi Rasid; Wan Kuzri; Muhd Nor Azam Abdul Azih; Adam Nor Azlin; Kumaahran Sathasivam; Dhia Azrai Naim Rosman; Thanabalan Nadarajah; Ariff Farhan Isa; Syamer Kutty Abba; Syazwan Andik; Danial Amier Norhisham; Irfan Zakaria; Akhyar Rashid; Ifwat Akmal; Dominic Tan	Indonesia (INA); Satria Tama Hardiyanto; Putu Gede Juni Antara; Andy Setyo; Ryuji Utomo; Evan Dimas; Muhammad Hargianto; Ezra Walian; Gavin Kwan Adsit; Febri Haryadi; Asnawi Mangkualam Bahar; Ricky Fajrin; Saddil Ramdani; Kurniawan Ajie; Hanif Abdurrauf Sjahbandi; Yabes Roni; Hansamu Yama; Marinus Maryanto Wanewar; Osvaldo Haay; Rezaldi Hehanusa; Septian David Maulana
Women's tournament	Vietnam (VIE); Đặng Thị Kiều Trinh; Nguyễn Thị Xuyến; Chương Thị Kiều; Vũ Thị Thúy; Bùi Thị Như; Vũ Thị Nhung; Nguyễn Thị Tuyết Dung; Nguyễn Thị Liễu; Trần Thị Thùy Trang; Nguyễn Thị Nguyệt; Phạm Hải Yến; Nguyễn Thị Muôn; Trần Thị Kim Thanh; Nguyễn Thị Bích Thùy; Nguyễn Hải Hòa; Nguyễn Thị Vạn; Huỳnh Như; Bùi Thúy An; Nguyễn Thị Thanh Hảo; Trần Thị Hồng Nhung	Thailand (THA); Waraporn Boonsing; Natthakarn Chinwong; Duangnapa Sritala; Ainon Phancha; Pikul Khueanpet; Silawan Intamee; Naphat Seesraum; Warunee Phetwiset; Sunisa Srangthaisong; Alisa Rukpinij; Rattikan Thongsombut; Orathai Srimanee; Nipawan Panyosuk; Khwanrudi Saengchan; Taneekarn Dangda; Yada Sengyong; Pitsamai Sornsai; Kanjana Sungngoen; Nisa Romyen; Saowalak Pengngam	Myanmar (MYA); Mya Phu Ngon; Khin Than Wai; Zin Mar Win; Wai Wai Aung; Phu Pwint Khaing; San San Maw; Win Theingi Tun; Naw Ar Lo Wer Phaw; Yee Yee Oo; Khin Marlar Tun; Khin Moe Wai; Le Le Hlaing; Than Than Htwe; May Sabai Phoo; Nu Nu; July Kyaw; Khin Mo Mo Tun; Zar Zar Myint; Ei Yadanar Phyo; Chit Chit

== See also ==
- Football 5-a-side at the 2017 ASEAN Para Games
- Football 7-a-side at the 2017 ASEAN Para Games
