= Myanmar women's national football team results =

This article lists the results and fixtures for the Myanmar women's national football team.

== Results and upcoming fixtures ==
Win Draw Lose

=== 2014 ===
15 May 2014 2014 AFC Women's Asian Cup	South Korea	12–0	Myanmar	Thống Nhất Stadium
17:15	Ji So-yun 4'; Park Eun-sun 17' (pen.), 43'; Park Hee-young 33'; Jeon Ga-eul 36', 40' (pen.), 63'; Cho So-hyun 45+3', 61', 82'; Kwon Hah-nul 58'; Yeo Min-ji 76'	Report		Attendance: 300; Referee: Casey Reibelt (Australia)

17 May 2014 2014 AFC Women's Asian Cup	Myanmar	0–3	China	Thống Nhất Stadium
17:15		Report	Ren Guixin 10'; Ma Xiaoxu 60'; Yang Li 87'	Attendance: 300; Referee: Sachiko Yamagishi (Japan)

19 May 2014 2014 AFC Women's Asian Cup	Thailand	2–1	Myanmar	Gò Đậu Stadium
19:15	Sung-Ngoen 27' (pen.); Duangnapa 59'	Report	Yee Yee Oo 45+1'	Attendance: 800; Referee: Rita Gani (Malaysia)

27 July 2014 Friendly	Myanmar	1–0	Thailand	Thuwunna YTC Stadium, Yangon
		Report

=== 2015 ===
11 March 2015 2016 AFC Women's Olympic Qualifying Tournament	Sri Lanka	0–16	Myanmar	Mandalarthiri Stadium, Mandalay
17:00		Report	Naw Ar Lo Wer Phaw 2', 4', 40'; Khin Moe Wai 6', 16', 20', 21', 26'; Nisansala 18' (o.g.); Win Theingi Tun 23', 28', 49', 77', 90+1'; Yee Yee Oo 48', 51'	Attendance: 5,456; Referee: Law Bik Chi (Hong Kong)

11 March 2015 2016 AFC Women's Olympic Qualifying Tournament	Myanmar	7–0	India	Mandalarthiri Stadium, Mandalay
17:00	Khin Moe Wai 8'; Khin Marlar Tun 15', 61'; Naw Ar Lo Wer Phaw 21'; Yee Yee Oo 28', 77'; Win Theingi Tun 90+2'	Report		Attendance: 5,003; Referee: Pannipar Kamnueng (Thailand)

2 May 2015 2015 AFF Women's Championship	Vietnam	3–2	Myanmar	Thống Nhất Stadium, Ho Chi Minh City
18:30	Huỳnh Như 6', 84'; Minh Nguyệt 30'	Report	Khin Moe Wai 13'; Naw Arlo Wer Phaw 23'	Attendance: 200; Referee: Rita Ghani (Malaysia)

4 May 2015 2015 AFF Women's Championship	Myanmar	4–1	Philippines	Thống Nhất Stadium, Ho Chi Minh City
16:00	Naw Arlo Wer Phaw 50', 53', 74'; Khin Moe Wai 66'	Report	Houplin 21'	Attendance: 130; Referee: Rita Ghani (Malaysia)

6 May 2015 2015 AFF Women's Championship	Myanmar	4–0	Malaysia	Thống Nhất Stadium, Ho Chi Minh City
16:00	Win Theingi Tun 43', 46'; Yee Yee Oo 68', 74'	Report		Attendance: 50; Referee: Patchaya Boonprasit (Thailand)

8 May 2015 2015 AFF Women's Championship	Australia U20	0–1	Myanmar	Thống Nhất Stadium, Ho Chi Minh City
16:00	Wai 51'	Report		Attendance: 300; Referee: Mai Hoàng Trang (Vietnam)

10 May 2015 2015 AFF Women's Championship	Myanmar	2–3	Thailand	Thống Nhất Stadium, Ho Chi Minh City
19:00	Khin Moe Wai 55'; Win Theingi Tun 75'	Report	Sungngoen 36'; Romyen 65'; Thongsombut 71'	Attendance: 600; Referee: Mai Hoàng Trang (Vietnam)

14 September 2015 2016 AFC Women's Olympic Qualifying Tournament	Jordan	0–2	Myanmar	Mandalarthiri Stadium, Mandalay
18:30		Report	Khin Moe Wai 17'; Wai Wai Aung 72'	Attendance: 3,894; Referee: Nami Imaizumi (Japan)

16 September 2015 2016 AFC Women's Olympic Qualifying Tournament	Myanmar	1–2	Thailand	Mandalarthiri Stadium, Mandalay
18:30	San San Maw 73'	Report	Anootsara 34', 69'	Attendance: 22,050; Referee: Casey Reibelt (Australia)

14 September 2015 2016 AFC Women's Olympic Qualifying Tournament	Vietnam	4–2	Myanmar	Mandalarthiri Stadium, Mandalay
18:30	Huỳnh Như 16', 74'; Minh Nguyệt 22', 45+1' (pen.)	Report	Wai Wai Aung 85'; Khin Moe Wai 88'	Attendance: 7,485; Referee: Kim Sook-hee (South Korea)

16 September 2015 2016 AFC Women's Olympic Qualifying Tournament	Myanmar	3–1	Chinese Taipei	Mandalarthiri Stadium, Mandalay
18:30	Khin Moe Wai 67'; Than Than Htwe 79'; Lin Kai-ling 83' (o.g.)	Report	Lee Hsiu-chin 90+1'	Attendance: 1,427; Referee: Nami Imaizumi (Japan)

=== 2016 ===
4 June 2016 Friendly	Myanmar	0–5	South Korea
17:00

7 June 2016 Friendly	Myanmar	1–4	South Korea
17:00

9 July 2016 Friendly	Myanmar	0–1	Thailand	Mandalarthiri Stadium, Mandalay
17:00

27 July 2016 2016 AFF Women's Championship	Myanmar	17–0	Timor-Leste	Mandalarthiri Stadium, Mandalay
18:00	Win Theingi Tun 3', 13', 19', 45+1', 75'; Khin Marlar Tun 7', 33'; Yee Yee Oo 21', 29', 39'; May Thu Kyaw 22', 54', 59'; Khin Mo Mo Tun 31'; Hlayin Win 65'; Wai Wai Aung 71', 90+2'	Report		Referee: Lee Yi-Chi (Chinese Taipei)

29 July 2016 2016 AFF Women's Championship	Malaysia	1–2	Myanmar	Mandalarthiri Stadium, Mandalay
18:00	Rofinus 18'	Report	Khin Moe Wai 45+2' (pen.); Win Theingi Tun 78'	Attendance: 15,000

31 July 2016 2016 AFF Women's Championship	Myanmar	1–1	Australia U-20	Mandalarthiri Stadium, Mandalay
18:00	Khin Moe Wai 41'	Report	Plessas 78'	Attendance: 22,500; Referee: Law Bik Chi (Hong Kong)

2 August 2016 2016 AFF Women's Championship	Vietnam	3–3 (a.e.t.) (5–4 p)	Myanmar	Mandalarthiri Stadium, Mandalay
18:00	Huỳnh Như 15'; Tuyết Dung 17'; Minh Nguyệt 90+4' (pen.)	Report	Win Theingi Tun 59', 90+1' (pen.); May Thu Kyaw 76'	Attendance: 31,000; Referee: Oh Hyeon-jeong (South Korea)
	Penalties
	Kiều (penalty scored); Minh Nguyệt (penalty scored); Tuyết Dung (penalty scored); Xuyến (penalty scored); Thùy (penalty scored)		(penalty scored) Win Theingi Tun; (penalty scored) Le Le Hlaing; (penalty missed) Khin Marlar Tun; (penalty scored) Khin Than Wai; (penalty scored) Khin Moe Wai

4 August 2016 2016 AFF Women's Championship	Myanmar	1–0	Australia U-20	Mandalarthiri Stadium, Mandalay
15:00	Win Theingi Tun 20'	Report		Attendance: 1,500

=== 2017 ===
19 January 2017 2017 Four Nations Tournament (women's football)	Myanmar	0–4	Ukraine	Century Lotus Stadium
16:00 UTC+08:00		Report	Tetyana Kozyrenko 28', 45+2'; Olha Boychenko 37'; Tamila Khimich 90+4'

21 January 2017 2017 Four Nations Tournament (women's football)	China	2–0	Myanmar	Century Lotus Stadium
16:00 UTC+08:00	Zhang Rui 48', 60'	Report		Referee: Mi Siyu (China)

24 January 2017 2017 Four Nations Tournament (women's football)	Thailand	3–0	Myanmar	Century Lotus Stadium
16:00 UTC+08:00	Kanjana 21', 45+2'; Taneekarn 58'

1 March 2017 Friendly	Myanmar	0–0	Thailand	Mandalarthiri Stadium, Mandalay

4 March 2017 Friendly, Unofficial	Myanmar	0–3	Thailand	Mandalarthiri Stadium, Mandalay

3 April 2017 2018 AFC Women's Asian Cup qualification	Iran	0–2	Myanmar	Vietnam YFT Center Field no.3, Hanoi
15:00 UTC+07:00		Report	July Kyaw 4'; Win Theingi Tun 45+3'	Attendance: 96; Referee: Qin Liang (China)

7 April 2017 2018 AFC Women's Asian Cup qualification	Myanmar	14–0	Syria	Vietnam YFT Center Field no.3, Hanoi
15:00 UTC+07:00	Naw Ar Lo Wer Phaw 7', 41', 90+6'; Yee Yee Oo 19', 45+2', 76', 82'; Win Theingi Tun 25' (pen.), 38', 39', 53', 60'; Wai Wai Aung 67'; Phu Pwint Khaing 87'	Report		Attendance: 56; Referee: Asaka Matsushita (Japan)

9 April 2017 2018 AFC Women's Asian Cup qualification	Myanmar	6–0	Singapore	Vietnam YFT Center Field no.3, Hanoi
15:00 UTC+07:00	Hla Yin Win 22'; Wai Wai Aung 41', 76'; Win Theingi Tun 56', 85'; Yee Yee Oo 72'	Report		Attendance: 55; Referee: Mi Siyu (China)

11 April 2017 2018 AFC Women's Asian Cup qualification	Vietnam	2–0	Myanmar	Vietnam YFT Center Field no.3, Hanoi
15:00 UTC+07:00	Dung 55'; Huỳnh Như 82'	Report		Attendance: 750; Referee: Qin Liang (China)

15 August 2017 2017 SEA Game	Thailand	3–2	Myanmar	UM Arena Stadium, Kuala Lumpur
16:00 UTC+08:00	Rattikan 68', 74'; Orathai 88'	Report	Win Theingi Tun 24', 80'	Referee: Kim Jye Hye (South Korea)

17 August 2017 2017 SEA Game	Myanmar	5–0	Malaysia	UiTM Stadium, Shah Alam
20:45 UTC+08:00	Farhanah 47' (o.g.); Win Theingi Tun 63', 77'; Khin Moe Wai 73', 79'	Report		Referee: Choki Om (Bhutan)

20 August 2017 2017 SEA Game	Vietnam	3–1	Myanmar	UM Arena Stadium, Kuala Lumpur
16:00 UTC+08:00	Yến 19'; Thùy 73'; Huỳnh Như 83'	Report	Win Theingi Tun 59'	Referee: 700

22 August 2017 2017 SEA Game	Myanmar	6–0	Philippines	UM Arena Stadium, Kuala Lumpur
16:00 UTC+08:00	Khin Moe Wai 4', 80', 90+4'; Win Theingi Tun 16'; Yee Yee Oo 18'; Naw Ar Lo Wer Phaw 19'	Report		Referee: Yu Hong (China)

=== 2018 ===
12 June 2018 Friendly	Thailand	1–1	Myanmar	Bangkokthonburi University Stadium
18:00 UTC+7	Kanjana 48'	Report	July Kyaw 80'

16 June 2018 Friendly	Thailand	2–1	Myanmar	Bangkokthonburi University Stadium
16:00 UTC+7	Rattikan 5'; Pitsamai 50'		Nu Nu 90'

1 July 2018 2018 AFF Women's Championship GS	Philippines	0–4	Myanmar	Jakabaring Stadium, Palembang
16:00		Report	Naw Ar Lo Wer Phaw 2'; Khin Moe Wai 23'; Win Theingi Tun 49'; July Kyaw 59'	Attendance: 150; Referee: Rebecca Durcau (Australia)

5 July 2018 2018 AFF Women's Championship GS	Myanmar	6–1	Indonesia	Jakabaring Stadium, Palembang
19:00	Win Theingi Tun 4', 12', 56', 65'; Thandar Moe 24'; July Kyaw 84'	Report	Yudith Herlina Sada 66'

7 July 2018 2018 AFF Women's Championship GS	Myanmar	7–0	Singapore	Jakabaring Stadium, Palembang
16:00	Yee Yee Oo 12', 22'; Nilar Win 40', 54'; Khin Moe Wai 70'; July Kyaw 76'; Khin Mo Mo Tun 89'	Report

9 July 2018 2018 AFF Women's Championship GS	Vietnam	4–3	Myanmar	Jakabaring Stadium, Palembang
19:00	Yến 22', 50'; Huỳnh Như 55', 77'	Report	Win Theingi Tun 58', 87'; Khin Mar Lar Tun 90+3'

11 July 2018 2018 AFF Women's Championship Semi-finals	Thailand	3–1	Myanmar	Bumi Sriwijaya Stadium, Palembang
16:00	Kanjana 35'; Pitsamai 52'; Rattikan 63'	Report	Khin Moe Wai 24'	Attendance: 150

13 July 2018 2018 AFF Women's Championship Third place match	Myanmar	0–3	Vietnam	Jakabaring Stadium, Palembang
16:00		Report	Tuyết Dung 10'; Vân 69'; Yến 70'

8 November 2018 2020 AFC Women's Olympic Qualifying	Myanmar	5–0	Bangladesh	Thuwunna Stadium, Yangon
18:00	Win Theingi Tun 34', 44'; Khin Moe Wai 60'; Le Le Hlaing 84'; Yee Yee Oo 88'	Report		Attendance: 1,381; Referee: Mahsa Ghorbani (Iran)

11 November 2018 2020 AFC Women's Olympic Qualifying	Nepal	1–1	Myanmar	Thuwunna Stadium, Yangon
18:00	Bhandari 3' (pen.)	Report	Khin Moe Wai 14'	Attendance: 1,601; Referee: Ri Hyang-ok (North Korea)

13 November 2018 2020 AFC Women's Olympic Qualifying	Myanmar	2–1	India	Thuwunna Stadium, Yangon
18:00	Win Theingi Tun 3'; Nge Nge Htwe 82'	Report	Ratanbala 23'	Attendance: 1,698; Referee: Ri Hyang-ok (North Korea)

=== 2019 ===
9 February 2019 Gold Cup	Myanmar	3−0	Nepal	Kalinga Stadium, Bhubaneswar
16:00 IST	Khin Moe Wai 44', 77'; Win Theingi Tun 54'	Report

11 February 2019 Gold Cup	Myanmar	2−0	Iran	Kalinga Stadium, Bhubaneswar
16:00 IST	Yee Yee Oo 90+1', 90+6'	Report

13 February 2019 Gold Cup	India	0−2	Myanmar	Kalinga Stadium, Bhubaneswar
19:00 IST		Report	July Kyaw 2'; Win Theingi Tun 90+4' (pen.)	Referee: C. R. Srikrishna (India)

15 February 2019 Gold Cup Final	Myanmar	3−1	Nepal	Kalinga Stadium, Bhubaneswar
16:00 IST	Yee Yee Oo 34', 63'; Win Theingi Tun 53'	Report	Manjali Kumari Yonjan 45+1'

21 March 2019 Friendly	Myanmar	0−1	Vietnam	Mandalarthiri Stadium, Mandalay
18:00

23 March 2019 Friendly	Myanmar	3−2	Vietnam	Mandalarthiri Stadium, Mandalay
18:00

3 April 2019 2020 Olympic 2R Q	Myanmar	3−1	Nepal	Mandalarthiri Stadium, Mandalay
18:00	Yee Yee Oo 24'; Win Theingi Tun 48' (pen.), 90+4'	Report	Thapa 45+2'	Attendance: 1,582; Referee: Mahsa Ghorbani (Iran)

6 April 2019 2020 Olympic 2R Q	Indonesia	0−6	Myanmar	Mandalarthiri Stadium, Mandalay
18:00		Report	Khin Marlar Tun 2', 49'; Yee Yee Oo 19', 65', 74'; Win Theingi Tun 32'	Attendance: 755; Referee: Cha Min-ji (South Korea)

9 April 2019 2020 Olympic 2R Q	Myanmar	3−3	India	Mandalarthiri Stadium, Mandalay
15:30	Win Theingi Tun 17', 23', 73'	Report	Ranganathan 10'; Yadav 32'; R. Devi 64'	Attendance: 851; Referee: Mahsa Ghorbani (Iran)

16 August 2019 2019 AFF Women's Championship GS	Myanmar	7–0	Indonesia	IPE Chonburi Stadium, Chonburi
15:00	Yee Yee Oo 3', 27', 90'; Khaing Thazin 17'; Khin Moe Wai 45+4'; Win Theingi Tun 66'; Khin Marlar Tun 76'	Report		Attendance: 45; Referee: Rita Gani (Malaysia)

18 August 2019 2019 AFF Women's Championship GS	Cambodia	1–10	Myanmar	IPE Chonburi Stadium, Chonburi
18:00	Nimol 77' (pen.)	Report	Yee Yee Oo 45+5', 73', 90', 90+4'; May Thu Kyaw 30'; Khin Marlar Tun 31'; Win Theingi Tun 60', 90+3'; Khin Moe Wai 64'; Thin Thin Yu 79'	Attendance: 90; Referee: Pansa Chaisanit (Thailand)

20 August 2019 2019 AFF Women's Championship GS	Myanmar	0–4	Vietnam	IPE Chonburi Stadium, Chonburi
15:00		Report	Phạm Hải Yến 13', 60'; Thái Thị Thảo 43'; Nguyễn Thị Tuyết Dung 63' (pen.)	Attendance: 70; Referee: Lee Yi-chi (Chinese Taipei)

25 August 2019 2019 AFF Women's Championship Semi-finals	Thailand	3–1	Myanmar	IPE Chonburi Stadium, Chonburi
18:00	Pitsamai 20'; Rattikan 81'; Silawan 88'	Report	Khin Marlar Tun 90+3'	Attendance: 200; Referee: Rebecca Durcau (Australia)

27 August 2019 2019 AFF Women's Championship Third place match	Myanmar	2−1	Philippines	IPE Chonburi Stadium, Chonburi
15:00

=== 2020 ===
25 January 2020 Friendly	Thailand	2−1	Myanmar
15:00

28 January 2020 Friendly	Thailand	1−1	Myanmar
15:00

=== 2021 ===
18 October 2021 2022 AFC Women's Asian Cup qualification Group D	Myanmar	4–0	Lebanon	Bishkek, Kyrgyzstan.
12:00 UTC+6	Win Theingi Tun 24' (pen.); Myat Noe Khin 64'; San Thaw Thaw 86'; July Kyaw 90+3'	Report (AFC)		Stadium: Dolen Omurzakov Stadium; Referee: Wang Chieh (Chinese Taipei)

21 October 2021 2022 AFC Women's Asian Cup qualification Group D	Guam	0–8	Myanmar	Bishkek, Kyrgyzstan.
17:00 UTC+6		Report (AFC)	Win Theingi Tun 4', 37'; Myat Noe Khin 14'; Khin Mo Mo Tun 50'; San Thaw Thaw 53', 85'; Pont Pont Pyae Maung 90'; July Kyaw 90+3'	Stadium: Dolen Omurzakov Stadium; Referee: Saltanat Noroozi (Iran)

24 October 2021 2022 AFC Women's Asian Cup qualification Group D	Myanmar	2–0	United Arab Emirates	Bishkek, Kyrgyzstan.
12:00 UTC+6	Khin Mo Mo Tun 5'; Chit Chit 23'	Report (AFC)		Stadium: Dolen Omurzakov Stadium; Referee: Veronika Bernatskaia (Kyrgyzstan)

=== 2022 ===
22 January 2022 2022 AFC Women's Asian Cup	Japan	5–0	Myanmar	Pune, India
19:30 UTC+5:30	Ueki 22'; Hasegawa 47', 90+2'; Naomoto 52'; Narumiya 70'	Report		Stadium: Shiv Chhatrapati Sports Complex; Referee: Veronika Bernatskaia (Kyrgyzstan)

25 January 2022 2022 AFC Women's Asian Cup	Myanmar	0–2	South Korea	Pune, India
19:30 UTC+5:30		Report	Lee Geum-min 50'; Ji So-yun 83'	Stadium: Shiv Chhatrapati Sports Complex; Referee: Casey Reibelt (Australia)

28 January 2022 2022 AFC Women's Asian Cup	Vietnam	2–2	Myanmar	Navi Mumbai, India
13:30 UTC+5:30	Nguyễn Thị Tuyết Dung 45+2'; Huỳnh Như 64' (pen.)	Report	Win Theingi Tun 28' (pen.); Khin Marlar Tun 49'	Stadium: DY Patil Stadium; Referee: Ranjita Devi Tekcham (India)

10 May 2022 2021 Southeast Asian Games GS	Myanmar	3–0	Laos	Cẩm Phả, Vietnam
21:30 (Note: Originally to be played at 16:00, the match was postponed and rescheduled due to heavy rain.)	Win Theingi Tun 30'; Khin Marlar Tun 57', 68'	Report		Stadium: Cẩm Phả Stadium; Referee: Choki Om (Bhutan)

13 May 2022 2021 Southeast Asian Games GS	Thailand	1–1	Myanmar	Cẩm Phả, Vietnam
19:00	Irravadee 13'	Report	Win Theingi Tun 79'	Stadium: Cẩm Phả Stadium; Referee: Sultanat Norouzi (Iran)

15 May 2022 2021 Southeast Asian Games GS	Singapore	0–1	Myanmar	Cẩm Phả, Vietnam
16:00		Report	Win Theingi Tun 90+4'	Stadium: Cẩm Phả Stadium; Referee: Esra'a Mahmoud (Jordan)

18 May 2022 2021 Southeast Asian Games SF	Vietnam	1–0	Myanmar	Cẩm Phả, Vietnam
19:00 UTC+7	Huỳnh Như 28'	Report		Stadium: Cẩm Phả Stadium; Attendance: 15,590; Referee: Haruna Kanematsu (Japan)

21 May 2022 2021 Southeast Asian Games Bronze medal match	Myanmar	1–2	Philippines	Cẩm Phả, Vietnam
16:00 UTC+7	Win Theingi Tun 24'	Report	Bolden 73'; Quezada 76'	Stadium: Cẩm Phả Stadium; Attendance: 11,635; Referee: Lê Thị Ly (Vietnam)

5 July 2022 2022 AFF Women's Championship GS	Timor-Leste	0–7	Myanmar	Biñan, Philippines
16:00 UTC+8			Naw Htet Htet Wai 17'; July Kyaw 19', 33'; Khin Marlar Tun 39'; Wai Phoo Eain 45+1'; Myat Noe Khin 60', 83'	Stadium: Biñan Football Stadium; Referee: Sunita Thongthawin (Thailand)

9 July 2022 2022 AFF Women's Championship GS	Myanmar	3–0	Cambodia	Biñan, Philippines
16:00 UTC+8	Khin Marlar Tun 34'; Myat Noe Khin 61'; Khin Moe Wai 87'			Stadium: Biñan Football Stadium; Referee: Sunita Thongthawin (Thailand)

11 July 2022 2022 AFF Women's Championship GS	Myanmar	3–1	Laos	Biñan, Philippines
16:00 UTC+8	Panatida 39' (o.g.); Khin Marlar Tun 47'; July Kyaw 64'		Aphatsala 66'	Stadium: Biñan Football Stadium; Referee: Jhesa Mae Kaatz (Philippines)

13 July 2022 2022 AFF Women's Championship GS	Vietnam	4–0	Myanmar	Manila, Philippines
19:00 UTC+8				Stadium: Rizal Memorial Stadium

15 July 2022 2022 AFF Women's Championship SF	Thailand	2–0	Myanmar	Manila, Philippines
				Stadium: Rizal Memorial Stadium

17 July 2022 2022 AFF Women's Championship 3rd Place Match	Myanmar	4–3	Vietnam	Manila, Philippines
	San Thaw Thaw 9', 56', 86'; Lin Myint Mo 83'		Huỳnh Như 23', 39'; Phạm Hải Yến 80'	Stadium: Rizal Memorial Stadium; Referee: Supiree Testhomya (Thailand)

=== 2023 ===
17 March 2023 Friendly	Cambodia	0–4	Myanmar	Kunming , China
--:-- UTC+8			Rupa Khin 24'; Khin Mo Mo Tun 35', 67'; Shwe Ritun 43'

19 March 2023 Unofficial Friendly	Sichuan WFC (China)	1–1	Myanmar	Kunming , China
--:-- UTC+8

22 March 2023 Unofficial Friendly	ChangChun FC (China)	0–0	Myanmar	Kunming , China
--:-- UTC+8

5 April 2023 2024 AFC Olympic Qualifiers Round 1	Iran	1–0	Myanmar	Yangon, Myanmar
16:00 UTC+6:30	Chatrenoor 52'	Report		Stadium: Thuwunna Stadium; Attendance: 880; Referee: Yang Shu-ting (Chinese Taipei)

8 April 2023 2024 AFC Olympic Qualifiers Round 1	Myanmar	1–1	Iran	Yangon, Myanmar
16:00 UTC+6:30	Win Theingi Tun 57'	Report	Zandi 14'	Stadium: Thuwunna Stadium

3 May 2023 2023 Southeast Asian Games	Philippines	0–1	Myanmar	Phnom Penh
19:00 UTC+7			Win Theingi Tun 90' (pen.)	Stadium: RCAF Stadium; Referee: Lara Lee (Australia)

6 May 2023 2023 Southeast Asian Games	Myanmar	1–3	Vietnam	Phnom Penh, Cambodia
16:00 UTC+7	Naw Htet Htet Wai 42'		Huỳnh Như 10'; Nguyễn Thị Thanh Nhã 76'; Trần Thị Thùy Trang 89'	Stadium: RCAF Old Stadium

9 May 2023 2023 Southeast Asian Games	Myanmar	5–1	Malaysia	Phnom Penh, Cambodia
16:00 UTC+7	July Kyaw 3', 40'; Khin Marlar Tun 27'; San Thaw Thaw 62', 83'		Sarah 59'	Stadium: RCAF Old Stadium

12 May 2023 2023 Southeast Asian Games SF	Thailand	2–4	Myanmar	Phnom Penh
16:00 UTC+7	Saowalak 10'; Orapin 18'		Yu Per Khine 43'; Win Theingi Tun 48'; Phyu Phyu Win 52'; Myat Noe Khin 90+2'	Stadium: RCAF Old Stadium

15 May 2023 2023 Southeast Asian Games Gold medal match	Vietnam	2–0	Myanmar	Phnom Penh
19:30 UTC+7	Huỳnh Như 12'; Nguyễn Thị Thanh Nhã 75'			Stadium: Olympic Stadium; Referee: Plong Pichakara (Cambodia)

22 September 2023 2022 Asian Games – Women's tournament	South Korea	3–0	Myanmar	Wenzhou
19:30 UTC+8	Lee Eun-young 24'; Ji So-yun 60'; Jeon Eun-ha 68'	Report		Stadium: Wenzhou Sports Center Stadium; Referee: Doumouh Al Bakkar (Lebanon)

25 September 2023 2022 Asian Games – Women's tournament	Hong Kong	0–1	Myanmar	Wenzhou
16:00 UTC+8		Report	Myat Noe Khin 69'	Stadium: Wenzhou Sports Center Stadium; Referee: Pansa Chaisanit (Thailand)

28 September 2022 Asian Games	Philippines	3–0	Myanmar	Wenzhou, China
19:30 UTC+8	Bolden 19' (pen.); Eggesvik 60', 61'	Report		Stadium: Wenzhou Sports Centre; Attendance: 4,436; Referee: Asaka Koizumi (Japan)

=== 2024 ===
9 July Friendly	Myanmar	2–1	India	Yangon, Myanmar
--:-- UTC+6:30	Win Theingi Tun 14'; San Thaw Thaw 74'	Report	Xaxa 58'	Stadium: Thuwunna Stadium

12 July Friendly	Myanmar	1–1	India	Yangon, Myanmar
--:-- UTC+6:30	Win Theingi Tun 50'	Report	Pyari Xaxa 48'	Stadium: Thuwunna Stadium

23 October Friendly	Myanmar	4–1	Hong Kong	Yangon, Myanmar
	Li Mo17; Thaw Thaw San 29; Yu Yu Naing 88; Tu Win Theingi 90+2		Hau Li 34	Stadium: Thuwanna Stadium

27 October Friendly	Myanmar	4–1	Hong Kong	Yangon, Myanmar
				Stadium: Yangon United Sports Complex

=== 2025 ===
17 February 2025 Vianet Championship group stage	Myanmar	3–1	Lebanon	Kathmandu, Nepal
13:30 UTC+5:45	Win Theingi Tun 57'; Shwe Yee Tun 72'; San Thaw Thaw 75'	Report	Iskandar 61'	Stadium: Dasharath Rangasala; Referee: Anjana Rai (Nepal)

20 February 2025 Vianet Championship group stage	Kyrgyzstan	0–5	Myanmar	Kathmandu, Nepal
13:30 UTC+5:45		Report	Yoon Wadi Hlaing 2', 41'; Sandar Lin 30'; May Htet Lu 36', 49'	Stadium: Dasharath Rangasala; Referee: Umesh Bidari (Nepal)

23 February 2025 Vianet Championship group stage	Nepal	2–2	Myanmar	Kathmandu, Nepal
17:30 UTC+5:45	Rana Magar 11'; Bhandari 41'	Report	May Htet Lu 6'; Myat Noe Khin 17'	Stadium: Dasharath Rangasala

26 February 2025 Vianet Championship final	Myanmar	2–0	Nepal	Kathmandu, Nepal
17:30 UTC+5:45	Yu Par Khaing 61'; Win Theingi Tun 63'	Report		Stadium: Dasharath Rangasala; Attendance: 19,580

29 June 2026 AFC Women's Asian Cup qualification	Myanmar	8–0	Turkmenistan	Yangon, Myanmar
--:-- UTC+6:30	Win Win 11', 28', 38'; Khin Mo Mo Tun 45', 76'; San Thaw Thaw 48'; May Htet Lu 52'; Tun Shwe Yee 90+4'	Report		Stadium: Thuwunna Stadium; Referee: Mu Mingxin (China)

2 July 2026 AFC Women's Asian Cup qualification	Bangladesh	2–1	Myanmar	Yangon, Myanmar
16:00 UTC+6:30	Ritu 19', 70'	Report	Win Win 89'	Stadium: Thuwunna Stadium; Referee: Esraa Almbaiden (Jordan)

5 July 2026 AFC Women's Asian Cup qualification	Myanmar	6–0	Bahrain	Yangon, Myanmar
--:-- UTC+7	Shwe Yee Tun 40', 42'; Khin Mo Mo Tun 45+5'; Win Theingi Tun 53'; May Htet Lu 58'; Win Win 73'	Report		Stadium: Thuwunna Stadium; Referee: Supiree Testhomya (Thailand)

7 August 2025 ASEAN Championship GS	Myanmar	2–1	Australia U23	Phú Thọ, Vietnam
16:30 UTC+7	May Thet Mon Myint 32'; Win Theingi Tun 47'	Report	Furphy 84'	Stadium: Việt Trì Stadium; Referee: Yoshimi Yamashita (Japan)

10 August 2025 2025 ASEAN Championship GS	Timor-Leste	0–3	Myanmar	Phú Thọ, Vietnam
16:30 UTC+7		Report	Win Theingi Tun 44', 55', 62'	Stadium: Việt Trì Stadium; Referee: Nguyễn Mạnh Hải (Vietnam)

August 13 2025 ASEAN Championship GS	Philippines	1–1	Myanmar	Haiphong, Vietnam
19:30 UTC+7	Mathelus 71'		Win Theingi Tun 33' (pen.)	Stadium: Lạch Tray Stadium

August 16 2025 ASEAN Championship SF	Myanmar	2–1	Thailand	Haiphong, Vietnam
16:00 UTC+7	Win Theingi Tun 13', 72' (pen.)	Report	Kwaenkasikarm 6'	Stadium: Lạch Tray Stadium; Referee: Kim Yu-jeong (South Korea)

19 August 2025 ASEAN Championship Final	Myanmar	0–1	Australia U23	Haiphong, Vietnam
19:30 UTC+7		Report		Stadium: Lạch Tray Stadium

=== 2026 ===
3 June AYA Bank Tri Nation Cup	Myanmar	0–1	Uzbekistan	Yangon, Myanmar
17:00 UTC+6:30			Nilufar Kudratova 22'	Stadium: Thuwunna Stadium

9 June AYA Bank Tri Nation Cup	Myanmar	1–1	Thailand	Yangon, Myanmar
17:00 UTC+6:30	May Htet Lu 50'		Thawanrat Promthongmee 55'	Stadium: Thuwunna Stadium

14 September 2026 Asian Games	South Korea	5–0	Myanmar	Osaka, Japan
19:30 UTC+9	Kim Min-ji 29', 33', 59'; Jang Sel-gi 38'; Choe Yu-ri 76'	Report		Stadium: Nagai Stadium; Attendance: 500; Referee: Tian Jin (China)

17 September 2026 Asian Games	Myanmar	0–8	North Korea	Osaka, Japan
19:30 UTC+9				Stadium: Nagai Stadium

21 September 2026 Asian Games	Bangladesh	0–0	Myanmar	Osaka, Japan
16:00 UTC+9		Report		Stadium: Nagai Stadium; Attendance: 571; Referee: Roziyabonu Yusupova (Uzbekistan)
