= 2022 AFC Women's Asian Cup Group C =

Group C is the third of three groups of the 2022 AFC Women's Asian Cup that took place from 21 to 27 February 2022. The group competition consists of Japan, Myanmar, South Korea and Vietnam. The top two teams automatically qualify for the top eight knockout stage, while third place is comparatively evaluated to other third-placed teams based on the football ranking system for the last two berths. The two teams that advanced are Japan and South Korea. Vietnam also made the quarter-finals as they are not comparatively last to the other third-place teams.

== Teams ==
Draw position	Team	Pot	Federation	Method of qualification	Date of qualification	Finals appearance	Last appearance	Previous best performance	FIFA Rankings										
Draw position	Team	Pot	Federation	Method of qualification	Date of qualification	Finals appearance	Last appearance	Previous best performance	FIFA Rankings	C1	Japan	1	EAFF	2018 champions	28 January 2021	17th	2018	Champions (2014, 2018)	13
C2	South Korea	2	EAFF	Group E winners	23 September 2021	13th	2018	Third place (2003)	18										
C3	Vietnam	3	AFF	Group B winners	29 September 2021	9th	2018	Sixth place (2014)	32										
C4	Myanmar	4	AFF	Group D winners	24 October 2021	5th	2014	Group stage (2003, 2006, 2010, 2014)	47										

== Standings ==
Pos	Team	Pld	W	D	L	GF	GA	GD	Pts	Qualification
1	Japan	3	2	1	0	9	1	+8	7	Knockout stage
2	South Korea	3	2	1	0	6	1	+5	7	Knockout stage
3	Vietnam	3	0	1	2	2	8	−6	1	Knockout stage
4	Myanmar	3	0	1	2	2	9	−7	1	

Source: AFC
Rules for classification: Group stage tiebreakers

== Matches ==
=== Japan vs Myanmar ===
21 January 2022
13:30

Japan	5–0	Myanmar
Ueki 22'; Hasegawa 47', 90+2'; Naomoto 52'; Narumiya 70'	Report (FIFA); Report (AFC)

Shiv Chhatrapati Sports Complex, Pune
Attendance: 0
Referee: Veronika Bernatskaia (Kyrgyzstan)

Japan

Team stats
Japan	Statistic	Myanmar
38	Shots	0
11	Shots on target	0
72%	Possession	28%
577	Passes	236
85%	Pass accuracy	63%
9	Fouls	8
0	Yellow cards	0
0	Red cards	0
1	Offsides	0
16	Corners	0

Myanmar

GK	18	Ayaka Yamashita
RB	2	Risa Shimizu
CB	4	Saki Kumagai (c)
CB	3	Moeka Minami
LB	5	Shiori Miyake	(substituted off) 84'
RM	14	Yui Hasegawa
CM	15	Fuka Nagano
CM	16	Honoka Hayashi	(substituted off) 43'
LM	23	Hinata Miyazawa	(substituted off) 69'
CF	11	Mina Tanaka	(substituted off) 46'
CF	19	Riko Ueki	(substituted off) 69'
Substitutions:
MF	8	Hikaru Naomoto	(substituted in) 43'
MF	13	Jun Endo	(substituted in) 46'
FW	9	Yuika Sugasawa	(substituted in) 69'
MF	17	Yui Narumiya	(substituted in) 69'
DF	22	Saori Takarada	(substituted in) 84'
Manager:
Futoshi Ikeda

GK	1	May Zin Nwe
RB	2	Aye Aye Moe	(substituted off) 90+1'
CB	3	Chit Chit
CB	21	Khin Than Wai
LB	5	Phyu Phyu Win
CM	20	Nu Nu	(substituted off) 61'
CM	6	Thine Thine Yu	(substituted off) 61'
CM	9	Khin Mo Mo Tun	(substituted off) 87'
AM	10	Khin Marlar Tun (c)
CF	8	San Thaw Thaw
CF	19	July Kyaw
Substitutions:
MF	16	Naw Htet Htet Wai	(substituted in) 61'
FW	17	Myat Noe Khin	(substituted in) 61'
DF	15	Zune Yu Ya Oo	(substituted in) 87'
DF	12	Nant Zu Zu Htet	(substituted in) 90+1'
Manager:
Tin Myint Aung

Assistant referees:
Ramina Tsoi (Kyrgyzstan)
Uvena Fernandes (India)
Fourth official:
Ranjita Devi Tekcham (India)

=== South Korea vs Vietnam ===
21 January 2022
19:30

South Korea	3–0	Vietnam
Ji So-yun 4', 81' (pen.); Trần Thị Phương Thảo 7' (o.g.)	Report (FIFA); Report (AFC)

Shiv Chhatrapati Sports Complex, Pune
Attendance: 0
Referee: Qin Liang (China PR)

South Korea

Team stats
South Korea	Statistic	Vietnam
25	Shots	1
9	Shots on target	0
73%	Possession	27%
557	Passes	212
82%	Pass accuracy	51%
11	Fouls	8
0	Yellow cards	1
0	Red cards	0
3	Offsides	1
10	Corners	1

Vietnam

GK	18	Kim Jung-mi
CB	2	Choo Hyo-joo
CB	6	Lim Seon-joo
CB	16	Jang Sel-gi
DM	17	Lee Young-ju
CM	10	Ji So-yun (c)
CM	8	Cho So-hyun	(substituted off) 88'
RW	11	Choe Yu-ri
LW	13	Lee Geum-min	(substituted off) 81'
CF	9	Yeo Min-ji	(substituted off) 69'
CF	23	Son Hwa-yeon	(substituted off) 88'
Substitutions:
MF	21	Kim Seong-mi	(substituted in) 69'
MF	7	Lee Min-a	(substituted in) 81'
FW	3	Seo Ji-youn	(substituted in) 88'
MF	22	Lee Jeong-min	(substituted in) 88'
Manager:
(England) Colin Bell

GK	14	Trần Thị Kim Thanh
CB	3	Chương Thị Kiều
CB	2	Lương Thị Thu Thương		(substituted off) 83'
CB	4	Trần Thị Thu
CM	17	Trần Thị Phương Thảo
CM	8	Trần Thị Thùy Trang
CM	22	Nguyễn Thị Mỹ Anh
RW	19	Nguyễn Thị Thanh Nhã		(substituted off) 86'
AM	7	Nguyễn Thị Tuyết Dung
LW	12	Phạm Hải Yến	(yellow card) 45+2'
CF	9	Huỳnh Như (c)
Substitutions:
DF	13	Lê Thị Diễm My		(substituted in) 83'
MF	16	Dương Thị Vân		(substituted in) 86'
Manager:
Mai Đức Chung

Assistant referees:
Fang Yan (China PR)
Xie Lijun (China PR)
Fourth official:
Wang Chieh (Chinese Taipei)

=== Myanmar vs South Korea ===
24 January 2022
13:30

Myanmar	0–2	South Korea
	Report (FIFA); Report (AFC)	Lee Geum-min 50'; Ji So-yun 84'

Shiv Chhatrapati Sports Complex, Pune
Attendance: 0
Referee: Casey Reibelt (Australia)

Myanmar

Team stats
Myanmar	Statistic	South Korea
4	Shots	20
2	Shots on target	8
27%	Possession	73%
230	Passes	579
56%	Pass accuracy	84%
11	Fouls	10
1	Yellow cards	2
0	Red cards	0
0	Offsides	0
1	Corners	9

South Korea

GK	1	May Zin Nwe
RB	12	Nant Zu Zu Htet		(substituted off) 64'
CB	3	Chit Chit
CB	21	Khin Than Wai
LB	5	Phyu Phyu Win
CM	20	Nu Nu		(substituted off) 64'
CM	16	Naw Htet Htet Wai
CM	9	Khin Mo Mo Tun	(yellow card) 65'	(substituted off) 84'
AM	10	Khin Marlar Tun (c)
CF	8	San Thaw Thaw
CF	19	July Kyaw		(substituted off) 90+2'
Substitutions:
DF	2	Aye Aye Moe		(substituted in) 64'
FW	17	Myat Noe Khin		(substituted in) 64'
MF	6	Thine Thine Yu		(substituted in) 84'
MF	13	Hnin Pwint Aye		(substituted in) 90+2'
Manager:
Tin Myint Aung

GK	18	Kim Jung-mi
RB	20	Kim Hye-ri (c)
CB	6	Lim Seon-joo
CB	4	Shim Seo-yeon		(substituted off) 82'
LB	2	Choo Hyo-joo
DM	17	Lee Young-ju
DM	16	Jang Sel-gi	(yellow card) 45+3'
CM	8	Cho So-hyun
RF	11	Choe Yu-ri		(substituted off) 72'
CF	23	Son Hwa-yeon	(yellow card) 28'	(substituted off) 34'
LF	13	Lee Geum-min
Substitutions:
MF	10	Ji So-yun		(substituted in) 34'
MF	7	Lee Min-a		(substituted in) 72'
MF	15	Park Ye-eun		(substituted in) 82'
Manager:
(England) Colin Bell

Assistant referees:
Ramina Tsoi (Kyrgyzstan)
Joanna Charaktis (Australia)
Fourth official:
Veronika Bernatskaia (Kyrgyzstan)

=== Vietnam vs Japan ===
24 January 2022
19:30

Vietnam	0–3	Japan
	Report (FIFA); Report (AFC)	Narumiya 38', 58'; Kumagai 50'

Shiv Chhatrapati Sports Complex, Pune
Attendance: 0
Referee: Lara Lee (Australia)

Vietnam

Team stats
Vietnam	Statistic	Japan
3	Shots	22
1	Shots on target	9
26%	Possession	74%
237	Passes	635
51%	Pass accuracy	81%
6	Fouls	13
1	Yellow cards	2
0	Red cards	0
0	Offsides	3
0	Corners	13

Japan

GK	14	Trần Thị Kim Thanh
RB	17	Trần Thị Phương Thảo
CB	3	Chương Thị Kiều	(yellow card) 78'
CB	4	Trần Thị Thu Thảo
LB	22	Nguyễn Thị Mỹ Anh
CM	16	Dương Thị Vân		(substituted off) 76'
CM	8	Trần Thị Thùy Trang
CM	18	Nguyễn Thị Vạn		(substituted off) 46'
RF	19	Nguyễn Thị Thanh Nhã
CF	9	Huỳnh Như (c)		(substituted off) 90+2'
LF	7	Nguyễn Thị Tuyết Dung		(substituted off) 89'
Substitutions:
FW	12	Phạm Hải Yến		(substituted in) 46'
DF	13	Lê Thị Diễm My		(substituted in) 76'
FW	21	Ngân Thị Vạn Sự		(substituted in) 89'
DF	2	Lương Thị Thu Thương		(substituted in) 90+2'
Manager:
Mai Đức Chung

GK	21	Momoko Tanaka
RB	2	Risa Shimizu		(substituted off) 55'
CB	4	Saki Kumagai (c)		(substituted off) 56'
CB	20	Hana Takahashi
LB	12	Ruka Norimatsu
RM	17	Yui Narumiya
CM	7	Rin Sumida
CM	8	Hikaru Naomoto		(substituted off) 63'
LM	13	Jun Endo
CF	11	Mina Tanaka		(substituted off) 77'
CF	9	Yuika Sugasawa	(yellow card) 30'	(substituted off) 46'
Substitutions:
MF	23	Hinata Miyazawa	(yellow card) 62'	(substituted in) 46'
DF	22	Saori Takarada		(substituted in) 55'
DF	6	Asato Miyagawa		(substituted in) 56'
MF	15	Fuka Nagano		(substituted in) 63'
FW	19	Riko Ueki		(substituted in) 77'
Manager:
Futoshi Ikeda

Assistant referees:
Heba Saadieh (Palestine)
Kristina Sereda (Uzbekistan)
Fourth official:
Mahsa Ghorbani (Iran)

=== Japan vs South Korea ===
27 January 2022
13:30

Japan	1–1	South Korea
Ueki 1'	Report (FIFA); Report (AFC)	Seo Ji-youn 85'

Shiv Chhatrapati Sports Complex, Pune
Attendance: 0
Referee: Edita Mirabidova (Uzbekistan)

Japan

Team stats
Japan	Statistic	South Korea
15	Shots	10
6	Shots on target	3
65%	Possession	35%
602	Passes	323
81%	Pass accuracy	67%
8	Fouls	12
0	Yellow cards	1
0	Red cards	0
2	Offsides	1
3	Corners	4

South Korea

GK	18	Ayaka Yamashita
RB	2	Risa Shimizu
CB	4	Saki Kumagai (c)
CB	3	Moeka Minami
LB	5	Shiori Miyake
CM	15	Fuka Nagano
CM	8	Hikaru Naomoto	(substituted off) 80'
RW	17	Yui Narumiya	(substituted off) 90+2'
AM	14	Yui Hasegawa
LW	23	Hinata Miyazawa
CF	19	Riko Ueki	(substituted off) 62'
Substitutions:
FW	11	Mina Tanaka	(substituted in) 62'
MF	7	Rin Sumida	(substituted in) 80'
DF	20	Hana Takahashi	(substituted in) 90+2'
Manager:
Futoshi Ikeda

GK	18	Kim Jung-mi
RB	20	Kim Hye-ri (c)
CB	6	Lim Seon-joo
CB	4	Shim Seo-yeon
LB	2	Choo Hyo-joo
DM	17	Lee Young-ju
CM	8	Cho So-hyun
CM	10	Ji So-yun
RW	11	Choe Yu-ri	(yellow card) 55'	(substituted off) 72'
LW	13	Lee Geum-min
CF	23	Son Hwa-yeon		(substituted off) 82'
Substitutions:
MF	7	Lee Min-a		(substituted in) 72'
FW	3	Seo Ji-youn		(substituted in) 82'
Manager:
(England) Colin Bell

Assistant referees:
Heba Saadieh (Palestine)
Kristina Sereda (Uzbekistan)
Fourth official:
Wang Chieh (Chinese Taipei)

=== Vietnam vs Myanmar ===
27 January 2022
13:30

Vietnam	2–2	Myanmar
Nguyễn Thị Tuyết Dung 45+2'; Huỳnh Như 64' (pen.)	Report (FIFA); Report (AFC)	Win Theingi Tun 28' (pen.); Khin Marlar Tun 49'

DY Patil Stadium, Navi Mumbai
Attendance: 0
Referee: Ranjita Devi Tekcham (India)

Vietnam

Team stats
Vietnam	Statistic	Myanmar
15	Shots	10
10	Shots on target	6
51%	Possession	49%
429	Passes	426
77%	Pass accuracy	74%
4	Fouls	11
1	Yellow cards	0
0	Red cards	0
2	Offsides	0
4	Corners	6

Myanmar

GK	14	Trần Thị Kim Thanh
RB	17	Trần Thị Phương Thảo
CB	3	Chương Thị Kiều
CB	4	Trần Thị Thu Thảo		(substituted off) 87'
LB	22	Nguyễn Thị Mỹ Anh
CM	16	Dương Thị Vân		(substituted off) 38'
CM	8	Trần Thị Thùy Trang
RW	19	Nguyễn Thị Thanh Nhã	(yellow card) 26'	(substituted off) 33'
AM	7	Nguyễn Thị Tuyết Dung
LW	12	Phạm Hải Yến		(substituted off) 87'
CF	9	Huỳnh Như (c)
Substitutions:
MF	23	Nguyễn Thị Bích Thùy		(substituted in) 33'
MF	11	Thái Thị Thảo		(substituted in) 38'
DF	2	Lương Thị Thu Thương		(substituted in) 87'
MF	18	Nguyễn Thị Vạn		(substituted in) 87'
Manager:
Mai Đức Chung

GK	1	May Zin Nwe
RB	2	Aye Aye Moe	(substituted off) 75'
CB	3	Chit Chit
CB	21	Khin Than Wai
LB	5	Phyu Phyu Win
CM	16	Naw Htet Htet Wai	(substituted off) 75'
CM	9	Khin Mo Mo Tun
RW	8	San Thaw Thaw	(substituted off) 90'
AM	10	Khin Marlar Tun (c)
LW	17	Myat Noe Khin	(substituted off) 64'
CF	7	Win Theingi Tun
Substitutions:
MF	20	Nu Nu	(substituted in) 64'
DF	12	Nant Zu Zu Htet	(substituted in) 75'
FW	19	July Kyaw	(substituted in) 75'
MF	13	Hnin Pwint Aye	(substituted in) 90'
Manager:
Tin Myint Aung

Assistant referees:
Uvena Fernandes (India)
Ensieh Khabaz (Iran)
Fourth official:
Lara Lee (Australia)

== Discipline ==
Fair play points would be used as tiebreakers in the group if the overall and head-to-head records of teams were tied, or if teams had the same record in the ranking of third-placed teams. These were calculated based on yellow and red cards received in all group matches as follows:

- yellow card = 1 point
- red card as a result of two yellow cards = 3 points
- direct red card = 3 points
- yellow card followed by direct red card = 4 points

Team	Match 1				Match 2				Match 3				Points
Team	Booked	(yellow card) (yellow-red card)	Sent off (straight red)	(yellow card) (red card)	Booked	(yellow card) (yellow-red card)	Sent off (straight red)	(yellow card) (red card)	Booked	(yellow card) (yellow-red card)	Sent off (straight red)	(yellow card) (red card)	Points
Myanmar					1								–1
Japan					2								–2
South Korea					2				1				–3
Vietnam	1				1				1				–3
