= 2013 AFC U-19 Women's Championship squads =

The 2013 AFC U-19 Women's Championship took place in 11–20 October 2013.

== Australia ==
Coach: (England) Spencer Prior

The final squad was named on 27 September 2013.

No.	Pos.	Player	Date of birth (age)	Club
1	GK	Mackenzie Arnold	25 February 1994 (aged 19)	(Football Australia) ACT Academy of Sport
2	DF	Rachael Soutar	8 April 1994 (aged 19)	(Football Australia) New South Wales
3	MF	Georgia Yeoman-Dale	24 February 1994 (aged 19)	(Football Australia) ACT Academy of Sport
4	DF	Grace Field	28 March 1994 (aged 19)	(Football Australia) ACT Academy of Sport
5	DF	Emma Checker	11 March 1996 (aged 17)	(Football Australia) South Australia
6	DF	Sally Rojahn	25 July 1994 (aged 19)	(Football Australia) ACT Academy of Sport
7	MF	Chloe Logarzo	22 December 1994 (aged 18)	(Football Australia) New South Wales
8	MF	Natalie Tobin	13 October 1996 (aged 16)	(Football Australia) New South Wales
9	MF	Olivia Price	17 May 1996 (aged 17)	(Football Australia) New South Wales
10	FW	Hayley Raso	5 September 1994 (aged 19)	(Football Australia) Queensland
11	FW	Brittany Whitfield	17 February 1994 (aged 19)	(Football Australia) Queensland
12	FW	Tara Andrews	13 March 1994 (aged 19)	(Football Australia) Newcastle Jets
13	FW	Meg McLaughlin	20 March 1995 (aged 18)	(Football Australia) ACT Academy of Sport
14	DF	Elizabeth Ralston	16 May 1995 (aged 18)	(Football Australia) New South Wales
15	MF	Amy Harrison	21 April 1996 (aged 17)	(Football Australia) New South Wales
17	MF	Melissa Caceres	29 February 1996 (aged 17)	(Football Australia) New South Wales
18	GK	Eliza Campbell	16 May 1995 (aged 18)	(Football Australia) Newcastle Jets
19	DF	Sarah Carroll	7 March 1995 (aged 18)	(Football Australia) Football West
20	MF	Alisha Bass	22 March 1995 (aged 18)	(Football Australia) New South Wales
21	GK	Sham Khamis	13 February 1995 (aged 18)	(Football Australia) Marconi Stallions
22	FW	Larissa Crummer	10 January 1996 (aged 17)	(Football Australia) Queensland
23	FW	Grace MacIntyre	30 April 1996 (aged 17)	(Football Australia) Newcastle Jets

== China ==
Coach: Wang Jun

No.	Pos.	Player	Date of birth (age)	Club
1	GK	Lu Feifei	10 November 1995 (aged 17)	(Chinese Football Association) Jiangsu Huatai
2	MF	Yao Lingwei	5 December 1995 (aged 17)	(Chinese Football Association) Jiangsu Huatai
3	DF	Zhong Xiudong	16 November 1994 (aged 18)	(Chinese Football Association) Guangdong Haiyin
4	DF	Wang Xi	23 January 1997 (aged 16)	(Chinese Football Association)
5	DF	Song Yuqing	2 March 1995 (aged 18)	(Chinese Football Association)
6	DF	Jiang Tingting	17 April 1995 (aged 18)	(Chinese Football Association)
7	MF	Liu Yanqiu	31 December 1995 (aged 17)	(Chinese Football Association) Wuhan Jiangda
8	MF	Dong Jiabao	21 November 1996 (aged 16)	(Chinese Football Association) Henan Steel
9	FW	Zhang Chen	11 October 1995 (aged 18)	(Chinese Football Association) Beijing Baxy
10	FW	Song Duan	2 August 1995 (aged 18)	(Chinese Football Association) Dalian Quanjian
11	MF	Zhang Zhu	20 May 1996 (aged 17)	(Chinese Football Association) Beijing Baxy
12	DF	Li Xiang	2 May 1994 (aged 19)	(Chinese Football Association) Changchun Huaxin
13	DF	Li Mengwen	28 March 1995 (aged 18)	(Chinese Football Association) Jiangsu Huatai
14	MF	Wu Chengshu	26 August 1996 (aged 17)	(Chinese Football Association)
15	DF	Lu Siqi	4 January 1995 (aged 18)	(Chinese Football Association) Army Club
16	MF	Zhao Xinzhai	8 January 1995 (aged 18)	(Chinese Football Association) Jiangsu Huatai
17	MF	Zhu Beiyan	17 January 1994 (aged 19)	(Chinese Football Association) Shanghai Women
18	FW	Wang Shuang	23 January 1995 (aged 18)	(Chinese Football Association) Wuhan Jiangda
19	FW	Xiao Yuyi	10 January 1996 (aged 17)	(Chinese Football Association) Shanghai Women
20	MF	Lyu Yueyun	13 November 1995 (aged 17)	(Chinese Football Association) Wuhan Jiangda
21	MF	Wang Yaping	8 June 1995 (aged 18)	(Chinese Football Association)
22	GK	Wang Xin	28 August 1995 (aged 18)	(Chinese Football Association)
23	GK	Nan Yang	16 August 1995 (aged 18)	(Chinese Football Association) Zhejiang Hangzhou Xizi

== Myanmar ==
Coach: (Bulgaria) Radov Minkovski

No.	Pos.	Player	Date of birth (age)	Club
1	GK	May Zin Nwe	7 March 1995 (aged 18)	
2	DF	Khin Zar Zar Win	15 February 1996 (aged 17)	
3	DF	Aye Aye Moe	4 February 1995 (aged 18)	
4	DF	Khin Than Wai	2 November 1995 (aged 17)	
5	DF	Lin Ohnmar Tun	14 December 1995 (aged 17)	
6	MF	May Sabai Phoo	31 July 1996 (aged 17)	
7	FW	Khin Nway Nway Shwe	4 July 1994 (aged 19)	
8	MF	Hla Yin Win	20 October 1995 (aged 17)	
9	FW	May Thu Kyaw	10 November 1995 (aged 17)	
10	MF	Win Theingi Tun	1 February 1995 (aged 18)	
11	MF	Nilar Win	19 March 1997 (aged 16)	
12	MF	Su Nandar Lwin	7 February 1996 (aged 17)	
13	DF	Chit Chit	18 October 1996 (aged 16)	
14	DF	Wout Yee	13 February 1995 (aged 18)	
15	FW	Zin Mar Tun	23 August 1995 (aged 18)	
16	DF	Ngu War Thei	2 November 1995 (aged 17)	
17	DF	Le Le Hlaing	24 March 1997 (aged 16)	
18	GK	Pa Pa Phyo	16 November 1995 (aged 17)	
19	MF	Yuper Khine	31 January 1996 (aged 17)	
20	MF	Yu Yu Win	19 April 1995 (aged 18)	
21	FW	Po Po Su	4 August 1994 (aged 19)	
22	GK	Thandar Oo	29 September 1997 (aged 16)	
23	MF	Aye Myo Myat	14 March 1995 (aged 18)	

== North Korea ==
Coach: Hwang Yong-bong

No.	Pos.	Player	Date of birth (age)	Club
1	GK	Kim Chol-ok	15 October 1994 (aged 18)	(DPR Korea Football Association) April 25
2	DF	Kim Nam-hui	4 March 1994 (aged 19)	(DPR Korea Football Association) April 25
3	DF	O Un-sim	5 January 1994 (aged 19)	(DPR Korea Football Association)
4	DF	Choe Sol-gyong	14 September 1996 (aged 17)	(DPR Korea Football Association) Rimyongsu
6	DF	Kim Hyang-mi	1 September 1995 (aged 18)	(DPR Korea Football Association) Kalmaegi
7	MF	Choe Yun-gyong	29 October 1995 (aged 17)	(DPR Korea Football Association)
8	MF	Rim Se-ok	13 January 1994 (aged 19)	(DPR Korea Football Association) Amrokkang
9	MF	Ri Hyang-sim	23 March 1996 (aged 17)	(DPR Korea Football Association) Amrokkang
10	FW	Ri Un-sim	20 May 1996 (aged 17)	(DPR Korea Football Association) April 25
11	MF	Kim Phyong-hwa	28 November 1996 (aged 16)	(DPR Korea Football Association) Hwangryongsan
12	MF	Jon So-yon	25 July 1996 (aged 17)	(DPR Korea Football Association) April 25
13	FW	Kim Mi-gyong	4 September 1994 (aged 19)	(DPR Korea Football Association) Sobaeksu
14	DF	Ri Kum-suk	7 December 1995 (aged 17)	(DPR Korea Football Association) Sobaeksu
15	MF	Choe Chung-bok	3 July 1996 (aged 17)	(DPR Korea Football Association)
16	DF	Ri Un-yong	1 September 1996 (aged 17)	(DPR Korea Football Association) Sobaeksu
17	MF	Kim Un Hwa	28 August 1996 (aged 17)	(DPR Korea Football Association) Wolmido
18	GK	Rim Yong-hwa	20 January 1996 (aged 17)	(DPR Korea Football Association) Sobaeksu
19	FW	Ri Kyong-hyang	10 June 1996 (aged 17)	(DPR Korea Football Association) April 25
20	FW	Kim So-hyang	2 January 1996 (aged 17)	(DPR Korea Football Association) Sobaeksu
21	GK	Pak Sun-gyong	14 March 1996 (aged 17)	(DPR Korea Football Association)
22	MF	Kim Su-gyong	4 January 1995 (aged 18)	(DPR Korea Football Association)

== Japan ==
Coach: Hiroshi Yoshida

The final squad was named on 26 September 2013.

No.	Pos.	Player	Date of birth (age)	Club
1	GK	Nene Inoue	28 June 1995 (aged 18)	(Japan Football Association) JFA Academy Fukushima
2	DF	Risa Shimizu	15 June 1996 (aged 17)	(Japan Football Association) Nippon TV Beleza
3	DF	Shiori Miyake	13 October 1995 (aged 17)	(Japan Football Association) JFA Academy Fukushima
4	DF	Ruka Norimatsu	30 January 1996 (aged 17)	(Japan Football Association) JFA Academy Fukushima
5	DF	Saki Ueno	20 November 1994 (aged 18)	(Japan Football Association) JEF United Chiba
6	DF	Mayo Doko	3 May 1996 (aged 17)	(Japan Football Association) Nippon TV Beleza
7	MF	Yu Nakasato	14 July 1994 (aged 19)	(Japan Football Association) Nippon TV Beleza
8	MF	Hikaru Naomoto	3 March 1994 (aged 19)	(Japan Football Association) Urawa Red Diamonds
9	FW	Mina Tanaka	28 April 1994 (aged 19)	(Japan Football Association) Nippon TV Beleza
10	FW	Ayaka Michigami	27 July 1994 (aged 19)	(Japan Football Association) INAC Kobe Leonessa
11	FW	Yuka Momiki	9 April 1996 (aged 17)	(Japan Football Association) Nippon TV Beleza
12	GK	Ayaka Yamashita	29 September 1995 (aged 18)	(Japan Football Association) Murata Girls High School
13	MF	Rin Sumida	12 January 1996 (aged 17)	(Japan Football Association) Nippon TV Beleza
14	MF	Yui Hasegawa	29 January 1997 (aged 16)	(Japan Football Association) Nippon TV Beleza
15	MF	Akari Kurishima	14 September 1994 (aged 19)	(Japan Football Association) Urawa Red Diamonds
16	MF	Ayaka Inoue	15 January 1995 (aged 18)	(Japan Football Association) Vegalta Sendai
17	DF	Miku Kojima	30 August 1996 (aged 17)	(Japan Football Association) JFA Academy Fukushima
18	DF	Miho Manya	5 November 1996 (aged 16)	(Japan Football Association) Hinomoto Gakuen High School
19	MF	Marin Hamamoto	9 October 1994 (aged 19)	(Japan Football Association) Kibi International University
20	FW	Akari Shiraki	4 November 1996 (aged 16)	(Japan Football Association) Tokiwagi Gakuen High School
21	GK	Chika Hirao	31 December 1996 (aged 16)	(Japan Football Association) JFA Academy Fukushima
22	MF	Miki Ito	10 September 1995 (aged 18)	(Japan Football Association) Tokiwagi Gakuen High School
23	MF	Ayaka Nishikawa	2 April 1996 (aged 17)	(Japan Football Association) Tokiwagi Gakuen High School

== South Korea ==
Coach: Jong Song-chon

The final squad was named on 1 October 2013.

No.	Pos.	Player	Date of birth (age)	Club
1	GK	Oh Eun-ah	17 January 1994 (aged 19)	(Korea Football Association) University of Ulsan
2	DF	Lee Su-bin	26 December 1994 (aged 18)	(Korea Football Association) Hanyang Women's University
3	DF	Ha Eun-hye	27 November 1995 (aged 17)	(Korea Football Association) Pohang Girls' High School
4	DF	Kim Ye-jin	8 October 1994 (aged 19)	(Korea Football Association) Hanyang Women's University
5	DF	Ahn Hye-in	16 October 1995 (aged 17)	(Korea Football Association) Chungnam Internet High School
6	MF	Kim U-ri	2 March 1994 (aged 19)	(Korea Football Association) University of Ulsan
7	FW	Lee Geum-min	7 April 1994 (aged 19)	(Korea Football Association) University of Ulsan
8	MF	Kim Se-reum	22 March 1994 (aged 19)	(Korea Football Association) Yeoju Institute of Technology
9	MF	Oh Yeon-hee	17 July 1994 (aged 19)	(Korea Football Association) Uiduk University
10	FW	Jang Sel-gi	31 May 1994 (aged 19)	(Korea Football Association) Gangwon Provincial College
11	FW	Choe Yu-ri	16 September 1994 (aged 19)	(Korea Football Association) University of Ulsan
12	MF	Kim In-ji	5 July 1994 (aged 19)	(Korea Football Association) Hanyang Women's University
13	MF	Choi Bich-na	21 February 1994 (aged 19)	(Korea Football Association) Uiduk University
14	MF	Lee So-dam	12 October 1994 (aged 18)	(Korea Football Association) University of Ulsan
15	FW	Jeon Han-sol	24 January 1995 (aged 18)	(Korea Football Association) Yeoju Institute of Technology
16	MF	Lee Na-ra	21 November 1994 (aged 18)	(Korea Football Association) Yeoju Institute of Technology
17	DF	Hong Hye-ji	25 August 1996 (aged 17)	(Korea Football Association) Hyundai High School
18	GK	Min Yuk-yeong	9 June 1995 (aged 18)	(Korea Football Association) Gwangyang Girls' High School
19	DF	Choi Yun-jung	26 January 1995 (aged 18)	(Korea Football Association) Uiduk University
20	DF	Kim Hye-yeong	26 February 1995 (aged 18)	(Korea Football Association) University of Ulsan
21	GK	Yoo Ga-eun	14 August 1995 (aged 18)	(Korea Football Association) Hwacheon Information High School
22	FW	Kim So-yi	8 December 1995 (aged 17)	(Korea Football Association) Hyundai High School
