= 2019 Gold Cup (India) =

Tournament details
- Host country: India
- City: Bhubaneswar, Odisha
- Dates: 9–15 February 2019
- Teams: 4 (from 1 confederation)
- Venue: 1 (in 1 host city)

Final positions
- Champions: Myanmar (1st title)
- Runners-up: Nepal

Tournament statistics
- Matches played: 7
- Goals scored: 18 (2.57 per match)
- Top scorer(s): (Myanmar) Yee Yee Oo (Nepal) Sabitra Bhandari (4 goals each)
- Best player: (Myanmar) Win Theingi Tun
- Best goalkeeper: (Myanmar) Zar Zar Myint
- Fair play award: Myanmar
- All statistics correct as of 15 February 2019.

The 2019 Gold Cup (known as the 2019 Hero Gold Cup for sponsorship reasons) was a 4-team association football tournament held at the Kalinga Stadium in the Indian city of Bhubaneswar between 9 and 15 February 2019. The tournament was being organized by the All India Football Federation in association with Government of Odisha, as part of the senior women's team's preparation for AFC 2020 Olympic Qualification - Second Round.

== Participating nations ==
The FIFA Rankings, as of 7 December 2018:

- Myanmar (44)
- Iran (60)
- India (62)
- Nepal (108)

== Venue ==
Bhubaneswar
Kalinga Stadium
Capacity: 15,000
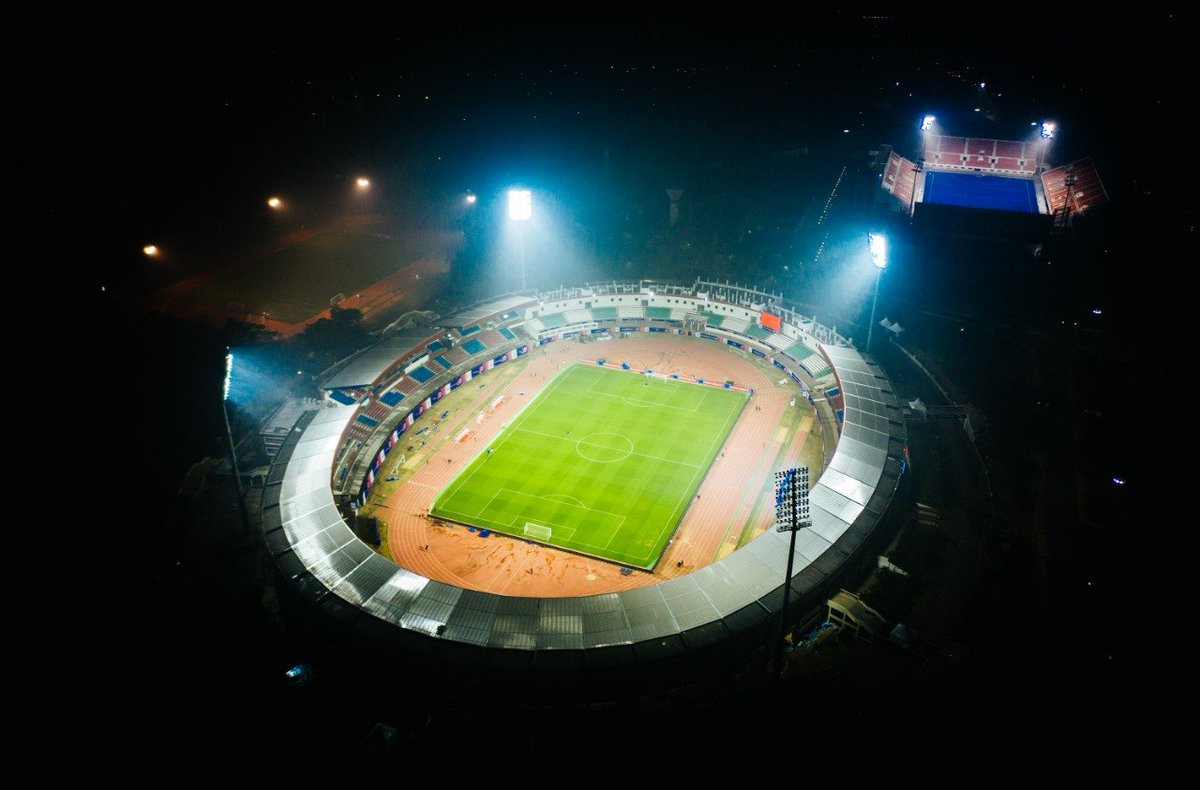

== Round Robin ==
- All matches are held in Bhubaneswar.
- Times listed are UTC+05:30.

Pos	Team	Pld	W	D	L	GF	GA	GD	Pts	Qualification
1	Myanmar	3	3	0	0	7	0	+7	9	Advanced to final
2	Nepal	3	2	0	1	5	4	+1	6	Advanced to final
3	India (H)	3	1	0	2	2	4	−2	3	
4	Iran	3	0	0	3	0	6	−6	0	

Source: AIFF
(H) Hosts
9 February 2019
16:00

Myanmar	3−0	Nepal
Khin Moe Wai 44', 77'; Win Theingi Tun 54'	Report

Kalinga Stadium, Bhubaneswar, India
9 February 2019
19:00

India	1−0	Iran
Anju Tamang 48'	Report

Kalinga Stadium, Bhubaneswar, India
Referee: C. R. Srikrishna (India)

11 February 2019
16:00

Myanmar	2−0	Iran
Yee Yee Oo 90+1', 90+6'	Report

Kalinga Stadium, Bhubaneswar, India
11 February 2019
19:00

India	1−2	Nepal
Ratanbala Devi 84'	Report	Sabitra Bhandari 5', 7'

Kalinga Stadium, Bhubaneswar, India
Referee: G. Ruba Devi (India)

13 February 2019
16:00

Iran	0−3	Nepal
	Report	Anita Basnet 41'; Sabitra Bhandari 59', 89'

Kalinga Stadium, Bhubaneswar, India
13 February 2019
19:00

India	0−2	Myanmar
	Report	July Kyaw 2'; Win Theingi Tun 90+4' (pen.)

Kalinga Stadium, Bhubaneswar, India
Referee: C. R. Srikrishna (India)

== Final ==
15 February 2019
18:00

Myanmar	3−1	Nepal
Yee Yee Oo 34', 63'; Win Theingi Tun 53'	Report	Manjali Kumari Yonjan 45+1'

Kalinga Stadium, Bhubaneswar, India

== See also ==
- Women's football in India
- Women's football
