= Trần Thị Phương Thảo =

Vietnamese footballer

Personal information
- Date of birth: 15 January 1993 (age 33)
- Place of birth: Ho Chi Minh City, Vietnam
- Height: 1.57 m (5 ft 2 in)
- Position: Midfielder

Team information
- Current team: Hồ Chí Minh City I
- Number: 37

Senior career*
Years	Team	Apps	(Gls)
2012–	Hồ Chí Minh City I	49	(30)

International career^{‡}
2013–	Vietnam	42	(11)
- * Club domestic league appearances and goals ‡ National team caps and goals as of 11 March 2020

Trần Thị Phương Thảo (born 27 March 1989) is a Vietnamese footballer who plays as a midfielder for Women's Championship club Hồ Chí Minh City I and the Vietnam women's national team.

She is the twin sister of Trần Thị Thu Thảo. Both featured in the squad for the 2022 AFC Women's Asian Cup, in which Vietnam gained their historical qualification to the 2023 FIFA Women's World Cup.
