= Zune Yu Ya Oo =

Burmese footballer

Personal information
- Date of birth: 12 February 2001 (age 25)
- Place of birth: Seikphyu, Myanmar
- Height: 1.58 m (5 ft 2 in)
- Position: Defender

Team information
- Current team: Ayeyawady
- Number: 4

Senior career*
Years	Team	Apps	(Gls)
2020–2024	Myawady W.F.C		
2025–	Ayeyawady		

International career^{‡}
2016	Myanmar U16	4	(0)
2018–2019	Myanmar U19	7	(0)
2020–	Myanmar	30	(0)
- * Club domestic league appearances and goals ‡ National team caps and goals as of 30 September 2023

Zune Yu Ya Oo (born 12 February 2001) is a Burmese women's professional footballer who plays as a defender for the Myanmar women's national team.

== See also ==
- List of Myanmar women's international footballers
