= List of Myanmar women's international footballers =

This is a list of Myanmar women's international footballers who have played for the Myanmar women's national football team.

== Players ==
Name	Caps	Goals	National team years	Club(s)
Aye Aye Moe	15	0	2017–	(Myanmar) Myawady FC
Chit Chit	15	0	2019–	(Myanmar) Thitsar Arman FC
Ei Yadanar Phyo	16	0	2018–	(Myanmar) ISPE FC
Hla Yin Win	3	1	2017–2019	–
July Kyaw	22	4	2017–	(Myanmar) Shan United
Khaing Thazin	20	0	2018–	(Myanmar) Shan United
Khin Marlar Tun	33	7	2009–	(Myanmar) ISPE FC
Khin Moe Wai	34	8	2010–	(Myanmar) Thitsar Arman FC
Khin Mo Mo Tun	23	0	–	(Myanmar) Thitsar Arman FC
Khin Myo Win	6	0	–	(Myanmar) ISPE FC
Khin Than Wai	26	0	–	–
Le Le Hlaing	13	1	–	–
Margret Marri	4	1	–	–
May Khin Ya Min	6	0	2009–2013	–
May Sabai Phoo	3	0	–	–
May Thu Kyaw	4	0	–	–
May Zin Nwe	6	0	–	(Myanmar) Shan United
May Thet Mon Myint	6	0	–	(Myanmar) Thitsar Arman W.F.C.
Moe Moe War	6	0	–	–
Mya Phu Ngon	16	0	–	(Myanmar) ISPE FC
Myat Noe Khin	6	0	–	(Myanmar) Thitsar Arman
Myint Myint Aye	3	0	–	–
Nan Kyay Ngon	4	0	–	–
Naw Ar Lo Wer Phaw	11+	4+	2010–2017	–
Naw Htet Htet Wai	-	=	2020–	(Myanmar) Ayeyawady
Nay Zar Lin Lin Aung	1	0	2010	–
Nge Nge Htwe	13	1	–	(Myanmar) Thitsar Arman FC
Nilar Myint	2	0	2013	–
Nilar Win	1	0	2014	–
Nu Nu	16	1	–	(Myanmar) ISPE FC
Phu Pwint Khaing	9	1	–	–
Phyu Phyu Win	4	0	–	(Myanmar) Ayeyawady
San San Maw	6	0	–	–
San San Thein	5	0	2009–2010	–
San Thaw Thaw	4	0	–	(Myanmar) Ayeyawady
Shwe Sin Aung	1	0	2013	–
Than Than Htwe	6	0	–	–
Thin Thin Soe	2	0	2010–2013	–
Thin Thin Yu	10	0	–	(Myanmar) ISPE FC
Wai Wai Aung	18	3	–	(Myanmar) ISPE FC
Win Theingi Tun	22	23	2017–	(Myanmar) Myawady FC
Yee Yee Oo	33+	26+	2009–	(Myanmar) ISPE FC
Yun Me Me Lwin	1	0	2018	–
Yuper Khine	8	0	–	(Myanmar) Shan United
Zar Zar Myint	8	0	–	–
Zin Mar Win	7	0	–	–
Zune Yu Ya Oo	1	0	2020–	(Myanmar) Ayeyawady

== See also ==
- Myanmar women's national football team
