= Nguyễn Thị Mỹ Anh =

Vietnamese footballer

Personal information
- Date of birth: 27 November 1994 (age 31)
- Place of birth: Ho Chi Minh City, Vietnam
- Height: 1.54 m (5 ft 1 in)
- Positions: Left-back; right-back

Team information
- Current team: Thái Nguyên T&T
- Number: 20

Senior career*
Years	Team	Apps	(Gls)
2013–2021	Hồ Chí Minh City I	98	(11)
2022–	Thái Nguyên T&T	10	(1)

International career^{‡}
2018–	Vietnam	32	(1)
- Vietnam (futsal)
- * Club domestic league appearances and goals ‡ National team caps and goals as of 29 June 2025

Nguyễn Thị Mỹ Anh (born 27 November 1994) is a Vietnamese footballer who plays as a right-back or a right back for Vietnam Women's Championship club Thái Nguyên T&T and the Vietnamese national team.

== International Apps ==
As of match played 29 June 2025

Appearances and goals by national team and year
National Team	Year	Apps	Goals
Vietnam	2018	7	0
Vietnam	2019	0	0
Vietnam	2020	0	0
Vietnam	2021	0	0
Vietnam	2022	13	0
Vietnam	2023	9	0
Vietnam	2024	2	0
Vietnam	2025	1	1
Total		32	1

=== International goals ===
No.	Date	Venue	Opponent	Score	Result	Competition
1.	29 June 2025	Việt Trì Stadium, Việt Trì, Vietnam	Maldives	5–0	7–0	2026 AFC Women's Asian Cup qualification
