= Tin Myint Aung =

Burmese football player and manager (1967–2026)

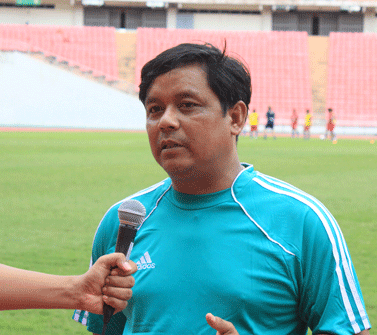

Personal information
- Date of birth: 25 March 1967
- Place of birth: Burma
- Date of death: 23 March 2026 (aged 58)
- Place of death: Yangon, Myanmar
- Position: Midfielder

Senior career*
Years	Team	Apps	(Gls)
- Finance and Revenue F.C.

International career
1988–1999	Myanmar	35	(10)

Managerial career
- 2006: Ayeyawady United
- 2008–2009: Myanmar Women
- 2010: Myanmar
- 2010–2011: Myanmar U23
- 2019–2023: Myanmar Women
- * Club domestic league appearances and goals

Tin Myint Aung (Burmese: တင်မြင့်အောင်; 25 March 1967 – 23 March 2026) was a Burmese football player and manager.

== Career ==
His playing career established in the Yangon University. In 1987, he was a key player of Finance and Revenue F.C., the most successful football club in Myanmar football history. He moved to Malaysia along with Myo Hlaing Win and Than Toe Aung in 1989 and he came back in 1991. He retired in 2000.

== Death ==
Tin died at Grand Handa International Hospital in Yangon, Myanmar, on 23 March 2026, at the age of 58.
