= 2022 AFC Women's Asian Cup =

20th edition of the AFC Women's Asian Cup, held in India

Tournament details
- Host country: India
- Dates: 20 January – 6 February
- Teams: 12 (from 1 confederation)
- Venues: 3 (in 3 host cities)

Final positions
- Champions: China (9th title)
- Runners-up: South Korea

Tournament statistics
- Matches played: 26
- Goals scored: 104 (4 per match)
- Attendance: 0 (0 per match)
- Top scorer(s): (Australia) Sam Kerr (7 goals)
- Best player: (China) Wang Shanshan
- Best goalkeeper: (China) Zhu Yu
- Fair play award: South Korea

The 2022 AFC Women's Asian Cup was the 20th edition of the AFC Women's Asian Cup, the quadrennial international women's football tournament in Asia competed by the national teams in the Asian Football Confederation (AFC).

India was selected as the host nation by the AFC Women's Football Committee in June 2020. It was the first time that the country hosted the competition since 1980. On 28 January 2021, the AFC confirmed that the tournament would take place between 20 January and 6 February 2022, instead of the original scheduled dates of late October and early November.

For the first time in the competition, the final tournament was expanded from eight teams to twelve. It served as the final stage of Asian qualification for the 2023 FIFA Women's World Cup in Australia and New Zealand (Regulations Article 4.6), with Australia qualifying automatically as co-hosts. Five teams qualified directly for the World Cup via the knockout stage and two more advanced to the inter-confederation play-offs.

Japan were the two-time defending champions, but were eliminated in the semi-finals by China PR on penalties. The Chinese went on to win their record-extending ninth title by defeating South Korea 3–2 in the final.

The top three teams qualified for the 2026 AFC Women's Asian Cup.

== Host selection ==
The following three football associations submitted their interest to host the tournament by the 31 May 2019 deadline.

- India
- Chinese Taipei
- Uzbekistan

India had previously hosted the 1980 AFC Women's Championship, originally scheduled for 1979, while Chinese Taipei hosted the 1977 and 2001 editions of the tournament.

India was recommended for hosting the tournament by the AFC Women's Football Committee on 19 February 2020. On 5 June 2020, the country was awarded the hosting rights.

== Impact of the COVID-19 pandemic ==
The 2022 AFC Women's Asian Cup was held amid the COVID-19 pandemic which affected the organization of the tournament. As a response, the tournament was held under a bio-secure bubble setup. All participating teams were granted exemption from institutional quarantine when foreigners were normally required to undergo home quarantine for seven days from 11 January 2022. Members of the participating teams underwent initial tests for COVID-19 upon arrival. They were required to stay in their hotels while they awaited their test results. Following negative test results, the movement of players and officials were restricted to the hotel, and the training and match venues.

Several teams reported positive COVID-19 cases during the tournament, namely China, India, Japan, South Korea, Myanmar, the Philippines, and Vietnam. Host India were the most affected, with as many as 12 players testing positive for COVID-19, rendering them unable to name 13 players for their match against Chinese Taipei, as required. India was forced to withdraw due to tournament regulations.

== Qualification ==
The host country India and the top three teams of the previous tournament in 2018 qualified automatically, while the other eight teams were decided by qualification matches played in September and October 2021.

=== Qualified teams ===
The following twelve teams qualified for the tournament:

Team	Method of qualification	Date of qualification	Finals appearance	Last appearance	FIFA Ranking (Note: As published on 10 December 2021)	Previous best performance
India	Hosts	5 June 2020	9th	2003	55th	Runners-up (1979, 1983)
Japan	2018 champions	28 January 2021	17th	2018	13th	Champions (2014, 2018)
Australia	2018 runners-up	28 January 2021	6th	2018	11th	Champions (2010)
China	2018 third place	28 January 2021	15th	2018	19th	Champions (1986, 1989, 1991, 1993, 1995, 1997, 1999, 2006)
Chinese Taipei	Group A winners	24 October 2021	14th	2008	39th	Champions (1977, 1979, 1981)
Vietnam	Group B winners	29 September 2021	9th	2018	32nd	Sixth place (2014)
Indonesia (Note: Due to non-compliance with conditions set by the World Anti-Doping Agency (WADA), Thailand and Indonesia were not allowed to be represented by their national flags. The sanctions took effect in October 2021. Thailand was represented by its national team logo and Indonesia by its coat of arms. The sanctions for Thailand were lifted on 4 February 2022.)	Group C winners	27 September 2021	5th	1989	94th	Fourth place (1977, 1986)
Myanmar	Group D winners	24 October 2021	5th	2014	47th	Group stage (2003, 2006, 2010, 2014)
South Korea	Group E winners	23 September 2021	13th	2018	18th	Third place (2003)
Philippines	Group F winners	24 September 2021	10th	2018	64th	Sixth place (2018)
Iran	Group G winners	25 September 2021	1st	N/A	70th	Debut
Thailand	Group H winners	25 September 2021	17th	2018	38th	Champions (1983)

== Match officials ==
On 6 January 2022, the AFC announced the list of 16 referees, 16 assistant referees, two stand-by referees, two stand-by assistant referees and six video match officials for the tournament. Video assistant referees (VAR) would be used from the quarter-finals onwards.

Originally, Law Bik Chi (Hong Kong) was selected for the tournament. However, she was unable to travel to India due to travel restriction. She was replaced by Wang Chieh (Chinese Taipei).

Referees

- (Australia) Casey Reibelt
- (Australia) Lara Lee
- (Australia) Kate Jacewicz
- (China) Qin Liang
- (Chinese Taipei) Wang Chieh
- (India) Ranjita Devi Tekcham
- (Iran) Mahsa Ghorbani
- (Iran) Mahnaz Zokaee
- (Japan) Yoshimi Yamashita
- (Japan) Asaka Koizumi
- (Myanmar) Thein Thein Aye
- (Singapore) Abirami Naidu
- (South Korea) Oh Hyeon-jeong
- (South Korea) Kim Yu-jeong
- (Thailand) Pansa Chaisanit
- (Uzbekistan) Edita Mirabidova

Assistant referees

- (Australia) Joanna Charaktis
- (China) Fang Yan
- (China) Xie Lijun
- (India) Uvena Fernandes
- (Iran) Ensieh Khabaz
- (Japan) Makoto Bozono
- (Japan) Naomi Teshirogi
- (Kyrgyzstan) Ramina Tsoi
- (Philippines) Merlo Albano
- (Palestine) Heba Saadieh
- (South Korea) Kim Kyoung-min
- (South Korea) Lee Seul-gi
- (South Korea) Park Mi-suk
- (Thailand) Supawan Hinthong
- (Uzbekistan) Kristina Sereda
- (Vietnam) Trương Thị Lệ Trinh

Video assistant referees

- (Iraq) Ali Sabah
- (Qatar) Abdulla Al-Marri
- (South Korea) Kim Hee-gon
- (Syria) Hanna Hattab
- (Thailand) Sivakorn Pu-udom
- (United Arab Emirates) Omar Mohammed Al-Ali

Stand-by referees

- (Kyrgyzstan) Veronika Bernatskaia
- (Vietnam) Công Thị Dung

Stand-by assistant referees

- (Thailand) Nuannid Dornjangreed
- (Uzbekistan) Zilola Rahmatova

== Venues ==
The venues for the 2022 AFC Women's Asian Cup were located across three cities in India. Originally, the host cities were Ahmedabad, Bhubaneswar and Navi Mumbai, and the AFC confirmed the three host cities of the event in June 2021. However, on 6 July 2021, AFC announced Mumbai, Navi Mumbai and Pune in Maharashtra would host the tournament. All matches are played behind closed doors as a precaution due to the COVID-19 pandemic.

Maharashtra	Mumbai	Navi Mumbai	Pune
2022 AFC Women's Asian Cup is located in Maharashtra	Mumbai Football Arena	DY Patil Stadium	Shree Shiv Chhatrapati Sports Complex
2022 AFC Women's Asian Cup is located in Maharashtra	Capacity: 7,000	Capacity: 55,000	Capacity: 11,900

== Draw ==
The final draw was held on 28 October 2021, 15:00 MYT (UTC+8), at the AFC House in Kuala Lumpur, Malaysia. The twelve teams were drawn into three groups of four teams. The seedings were based on their performance in 2018 AFC Women's Asian Cup final tournament and qualification, with the hosts India automatically seeded and assigned to Position A1 in the draw.

Pot 1	Pot 2	Pot 3	Pot 4
1. India (H); 2. Japan; 3. Australia	4. China; 5. Thailand; 6. South Korea	7. Philippines; 8. Vietnam; 9. Chinese Taipei	10. Myanmar; 11. Iran; 12. Indonesia

== Squads ==
Each team has to register a squad of a minimum of 18 players and maximum of 23 players, at least three of whom must be goalkeepers (Regulations Article 26.3).

== Group stage ==
The top two teams of each group and the two best third-placed teams qualified for the quarter finals.

Tiebreakers

Teams were ranked according to points (3 points for a win, 1 point for a draw, 0 points for a loss), and if tied on points, the following tiebreaking criteria were applied, in the order given, to determine the rankings (Regulations Article 7.3):

1. Points in head-to-head matches among tied teams;
2. Goal difference in head-to-head matches among tied teams;
3. Goals scored in head-to-head matches among tied teams;
4. If more than two teams are tied, and after applying all head-to-head criteria above, a subset of teams are still tied, all head-to-head criteria above are reapplied exclusively to this subset of teams;
5. Goal difference in all group matches;
6. Goals scored in all group matches;
7. Penalty shoot-out if only two teams are tied and they met in the last round of the group;
8. Disciplinary points (yellow card = 1 point, red card as a result of two yellow cards = 3 points, direct red card = 3 points, yellow card followed by direct red card = 4 points);
9. Drawing of lots.

All times are local, IST (UTC+5:30).

=== Group A ===
Pos	Team	Pld	W	D	L	GF	GA	GD	Pts	Qualification
1	China	2	2	0	0	11	0	+11	6	Knockout stage
2	Chinese Taipei	2	1	0	1	5	4	+1	3	Knockout stage
3	Iran	2	0	0	2	0	12	−12	0	
4	India (H)	0	0	0	0	0	0	0	0	Withdrew (Note: India failed to name the required 13 players and were unable to play their match of the group stage against Chinese Taipei due to them having only fewer than 13 players left with the remaining team members testing positive for COVID-19. They were considered to have withdrawn from the competition, with all matches played by them classified "null and void" and not considered in determining the final group rankings.)

Source: AFC
Rules for classification: Group stage tiebreakers
(H) Hosts
Notes:
20 January 2022
15:30

China	4–0	Chinese Taipei
Wang Shuang 3' (pen.), 69'; Wang Shanshan 9'; Zhang Xin 53'	Report (FIFA); Report (AFC)

Mumbai Football Arena, Mumbai
Attendance: 0
Referee: Abirami Naidu (Singapore)
20 January 2022
19:30

India	Voided (0–0)	Iran
	Report (FIFA); Report (AFC)

DY Patil Stadium, Navi Mumbai
Attendance: 0
Referee: Lara Lee (Australia)

23 January 2022
15:30

Iran	0–7	China
	Report (FIFA); Report (AFC)	Wang Shuang 28', 49' (pen.); Xiao Yuyi 43'; Wang Shanshan 55', 59'; Tang Jiali 77', 82'

Mumbai Football Arena, Mumbai
Attendance: 0
Referee: Pansa Chaisanit (Thailand)
23 January 2022
19:30

Chinese Taipei	Cancelled	India
	Report (FIFA); Report (AFC)

DY Patil Stadium, Navi Mumbai
Referee: Oh Hyeon-jeong (South Korea)

26 January 2022
19:30

India	Cancelled	China
	Report (FIFA); Report (AFC)

Mumbai Football Arena, Mumbai
26 January 2022
19:30

Chinese Taipei	5–0	Iran
Lai Li-chin 4', 31', 65' (pen.); Chen Yen-ping 40'; Wang Hsiang-huei 78'	Report (FIFA); Report (AFC)

DY Patil Stadium, Navi Mumbai
Attendance: 0
Referee: Asaka Koizumi (Japan)

=== Group B ===
Pos	Team	Pld	W	D	L	GF	GA	GD	Pts	Qualification
1	Australia	3	3	0	0	24	1	+23	9	Knockout stage
2	Philippines	3	2	0	1	7	4	+3	6	Knockout stage
3	Thailand	3	1	0	2	5	3	+2	3	Knockout stage
4	Indonesia	3	0	0	3	0	28	−28	0	

Source: AFC
Rules for classification: Group stage tiebreakers
21 January 2022
15:30

Australia	18–0	Indonesia
Kerr 9', 11', 26' (pen.), 36', 54'; Foord 14'; Fowler 17'; Raso 24', 88'; Carpenter 34', 49'; Van Egmond 39' (pen.), 57', 69'; Yallop 59'; Simon 67', 71'; Luik 78'	Report (FIFA); Report (AFC)

Mumbai Football Arena, Mumbai
Attendance: 0
Referee: Mahsa Ghorbani (Iran)
21 January 2022
17:30

Thailand	0–1	Philippines
	Report (FIFA); Report (AFC)	C. McDaniel 81'

DY Patil Stadium, Navi Mumbai
Attendance: 0
Referee: Công Thị Dung (Vietnam)

24 January 2022
15:30

Philippines	0–4	Australia
	Report (FIFA); Report (AFC)	Kerr 51'; Randle 53' (o.g.); Van Egmond 67'; Fowler 87'

Mumbai Football Arena, Mumbai
Attendance: 0
Referee: Wang Chieh (Chinese Taipei)
24 January 2022
17:30

Indonesia	0–4	Thailand
	Report (FIFA); Report (AFC)	Kanyanat 27', 36', 71'; Irravadee 76'

DY Patil Stadium, Navi Mumbai
Attendance: 0
Referee: Yoshimi Yamashita (Japan)

27 January 2022
19:30

Australia	2–1	Thailand
Van Egmond 39'; Kerr 80'	Report (FIFA); Report (AFC)	Nipawan 90+3'

Mumbai Football Arena, Mumbai
Attendance: 0
Referee: Thein Thein Aye (Myanmar)
27 January 2022
19:30

Philippines	6–0	Indonesia
Guillou 6'; Bolden 27'; Annis 56', 82'; Miclat 74' (pen.); Cesar 90+4'	Report (FIFA); Report (AFC)

Shiv Chhatrapati Sports Complex, Pune
Attendance: 0
Referee: Kim Yu-jeong (South Korea)

=== Group C ===
Pos	Team	Pld	W	D	L	GF	GA	GD	Pts	Qualification
1	Japan	3	2	1	0	9	1	+8	7	Knockout stage
2	South Korea	3	2	1	0	6	1	+5	7	Knockout stage
3	Vietnam	3	0	1	2	2	8	−6	1	Knockout stage
4	Myanmar	3	0	1	2	2	9	−7	1	

Source: AFC
Rules for classification: Group stage tiebreakers
21 January 2022
13:30

Japan	5–0	Myanmar
Ueki 22'; Hasegawa 47', 90+2'; Naomoto 52'; Narumiya 70'	Report (FIFA); Report (AFC)

Shiv Chhatrapati Sports Complex, Pune
Attendance: 0
Referee: Veronika Bernatskaia (Kyrgyzstan)
21 January 2022
19:30

South Korea	3–0	Vietnam
Ji So-yun 4', 81' (pen.); Trần Thị Phương Thảo 7' (o.g.)	Report (FIFA); Report (AFC)

Shiv Chhatrapati Sports Complex, Pune
Attendance: 0
Referee: Qin Liang (China PR)

24 January 2022
13:30

Myanmar	0–2	South Korea
	Report (FIFA); Report (AFC)	Lee Geum-min 50'; Ji So-yun 84'

Shiv Chhatrapati Sports Complex, Pune
Attendance: 0
Referee: Casey Reibelt (Australia)
24 January 2022
19:30

Vietnam	0–3	Japan
	Report (FIFA); Report (AFC)	Narumiya 38', 58'; Kumagai 50'

Shiv Chhatrapati Sports Complex, Pune
Attendance: 0
Referee: Lara Lee (Australia)

27 January 2022
13:30

Japan	1–1	South Korea
Ueki 1'	Report (FIFA); Report (AFC)	Seo Ji-youn 85'

Shiv Chhatrapati Sports Complex, Pune
Attendance: 0
Referee: Edita Mirabidova (Uzbekistan)
27 January 2022
13:30

Vietnam	2–2	Myanmar
Nguyễn Thị Tuyết Dung 45+2'; Huỳnh Như 64' (pen.)	Report (FIFA); Report (AFC)	Win Theingi Tun 28' (pen.); Khin Marlar Tun 49'

DY Patil Stadium, Navi Mumbai
Attendance: 0
Referee: Ranjita Devi Tekcham (India)

=== Ranking of third-placed teams ===
The top two teams qualified for the quarter finals. Due to the withdrawal of India in group A, results against the fourth-placed teams of each group B and C were not counted in determining the ranking of the third-placed teams.

Pos	Grp	Team	Pld	W	D	L	GF	GA	GD	Pts	Qualification
1	B	Thailand	2	0	0	2	1	3	−2	0	Knockout stage
2	C	Vietnam	2	0	0	2	0	6	−6	0	Knockout stage
3	A	Iran	2	0	0	2	0	12	−12	0	

Source: AFC
Rules for classification: 1) points; 2) goal difference; 3) goals scored; 4) disciplinary points; 5) drawing of lots.

== Knockout stage ==
=== Bracket ===
The losers of the quarter-final matches entered play-offs, the format of which depended on Australia's results in the tournament.

Quarter-finals
30 January – Navi Mumbai
China	3
Vietnam	1
30 January – Navi Mumbai
Japan	7
Thailand	0
30 January – Pune
Australia	0
South Korea	1
30 January – Pune
Chinese Taipei	1 (3)
Philippines (p)	1 (4)

Semi-finals
3 February – Pune
China (p)	2 (4)
Japan	2 (3)
3 February – Pune
South Korea	2
Philippines	0

Final
6 February – Navi Mumbai
China	3
South Korea	2

=== Quarter-finals ===
The winners qualified for the 2023 FIFA Women's World Cup. The losers, except for Australia, entered the play-offs.

30 January 2022
13:30

Australia	0–1	South Korea
	Report (FIFA); Report (AFC)	Ji So-yun 87'

Shiv Chhatrapati Sports Complex, Pune
Attendance: 0
Referee: Qin Liang (China PR)

30 January 2022
13:30

Japan	7–0	Thailand
Sugasawa 27', 65' (pen.), 80', 83'; Miyazawa 45+2'; Sumida 48'; Ueki 75'	Report (FIFA); Report (AFC)

DY Patil Stadium, Navi Mumbai
Attendance: 0
Referee: Casey Reibelt (Australia)

30 January 2022
17:30

China	3–1	Vietnam
Wang Shuang 25'; Wang Shanshan 52'; Tang Jiali 53'	Report (FIFA); Report (AFC)	Nguyễn Thị Tuyết Dung 11'

DY Patil Stadium, Navi Mumbai
Attendance: 0
Referee: Oh Hyeon-jeong (South Korea)

30 January 2022
19:30

Chinese Taipei	1–1 (a.e.t.)	Philippines
Zhuo Li-ping 82'	Report (FIFA); Report (AFC)	Quezada 49'
Penalties
Ting Chi (penalty scored); Wang Hsiang-huei (penalty scored); Chen Ying-hui (penalty scored); Hsu Yi-yun (penalty missed); Su Hsin-yun (penalty missed); Zhuo Li-ping (penalty missed)	3–4	(penalty scored) S. Castañeda; (penalty scored) Annis; (penalty missed) Miclat; (penalty missed) Long; (penalty scored) O. McDaniel; (penalty scored) Bolden

Shiv Chhatrapati Sports Complex, Pune
Attendance: 0
Referee: Thein Thein Aye (Myanmar)

=== Semi-finals ===
3 February 2022
13:30

South Korea	2–0	Philippines
Cho So-hyun 4'; Son Hwa-yeon 34'	Report (FIFA); Report (AFC)

Shiv Chhatrapati Sports Complex, Pune
Attendance: 0
Referee: Pansa Chaisanit (Thailand)

3 February 2022
19:30

China	2–2 (a.e.t.)	Japan
Wu Chengshu 46'; Wang Shanshan 119'	Report (FIFA); Report (AFC)	Ueki 26', 103'
Penalties
Zhang Xin (penalty missed); Zhang Rui (penalty scored); Yang Lina (penalty scored); Gao Chen (penalty scored); Wang Shanshan (penalty scored)	4–3	(penalty missed) Kumagai; (penalty scored) Hasegawa; (penalty scored) Shimizu; (penalty scored) Nagano; (penalty missed) Minami

Shiv Chhatrapati Sports Complex, Pune
Attendance: 0
Referee: Lara Lee (Australia)

=== Final ===
6 February 2022
16:30

China	3–2	South Korea
Tang Jiali 68' (pen.); Zhang Linyan 72'; Xiao Yuyi 90+3'	Report (FIFA); Report (AFC)	Choe Yu-ri 27'; Ji So-yun 45+3' (pen.)

DY Patil Stadium, Navi Mumbai
Attendance: 0
Referee: Casey Reibelt (Australia)

== Awards ==
The following awards were given at the conclusion of the tournament:

Most Valuable Player	Top Scorer	Best goalkeeper	Fairplay Award
(China) Wang Shanshan	(Australia) Sam Kerr (7 goals)	(China) Zhu Yu	South Korea

== Prize money ==
For the first time in the tournament's history, prize money was awarded to the top four teams of the tournament. The champions would receive US$1 million, the runners-up receive US$500,000 while the losing semi-finalists each receive US$150,000. In addition, five percent of the prize money earned by the champions and runners-up would be kept and issued to the AFC Dream Asia Foundation to fund social responsibility activities.

== Play-offs ==
The format of the play-offs round depended on the performance of Australia, who qualified automatically for the World Cup as hosts. Since Australia was eliminated in the quarter finals, the play-offs format was for the remaining three quarter-final losers to play a single round-robin play-off. The best team after three matches advanced to the World Cup, and the remaining two teams entered the inter-confederation play-offs.

Pos	Team	Pld	W	D	L	GF	GA	GD	Pts	Qualification
1	Vietnam	2	2	0	0	4	1	+3	6	Qualify for 2023 FIFA Women's World Cup
2	Chinese Taipei	2	1	0	1	4	2	+2	3	Advance to inter-confederation play-offs
3	Thailand	2	0	0	2	0	5	−5	0	Advance to inter-confederation play-offs

Source: AFC
Rules for classification: Group stage tiebreakers
2 February 2022
13:30

Thailand	0–2	Vietnam
	Report (FIFA); Report (AFC)	Huỳnh Như 19'; Thái Thị Thảo 24'

DY Patil Stadium, Navi Mumbai
Attendance: 0
Referee: Edita Mirabidova (Uzbekistan)

4 February 2022
13:30

Chinese Taipei	3–0	Thailand
Su Yu-hsuan 44', 84'; Chen Ying-hui 90+3'	Report (FIFA); Report (AFC)

DY Patil Stadium, Navi Mumbai
Attendance: 0
Referee: Kim Yu-jeong (South Korea)

6 February 2022
13:00

Vietnam	2–1	Chinese Taipei
Chương Thị Kiều 7'; Nguyễn Thị Bích Thùy 56'	Report (FIFA); Report (AFC)	Su Yu-hsuan 50'

DY Patil Stadium, Navi Mumbai
Attendance: 0
Referee: Yoshimi Yamashita (Japan)

== Statistics ==
=== Goalscorers ===
There were 104 goals scored in 26 matches, for an average of 4 goals per match.

7 goals

- (Australia) Sam Kerr

5 goals

- (Australia) Emily van Egmond
- (China) Wang Shanshan
- (China) Wang Shuang
- (Japan) Riko Ueki
- (South Korea) Ji So-yun

4 goals

- (China) Tang Jiali
- (Japan) Yuika Sugasawa

3 goals

- (Chinese Taipei) Lai Li-chin
- (Chinese Taipei) Su Yu-hsuan
- (Japan) Yui Narumiya
- (Thailand) Kanyanat Chetthabutr

2 goals

- (Australia) Ellie Carpenter
- (Australia) Mary Fowler
- (Australia) Hayley Raso
- (Australia) Kyah Simon
- (China) Xiao Yuyi
- (Japan) Yui Hasegawa
- (Philippines) Tahnai Annis
- (Vietnam) Huỳnh Như
- (Vietnam) Nguyễn Thị Tuyết Dung

1 goal

- (Australia) Caitlin Foord
- (Australia) Aivi Luik
- (Australia) Tameka Yallop
- (China) Wu Chengshu
- (China) Zhang Linyan
- (China) Zhang Xin
- (Chinese Taipei) Chen Yen-ping
- (Chinese Taipei) Chen Ying-hui
- (Chinese Taipei) Wang Hsiang-huei
- (Chinese Taipei) Zhuo Li-ping
- (Japan) Saki Kumagai
- (Japan) Hinata Miyazawa
- (Japan) Hikaru Naomoto
- (Japan) Rin Sumida
- (Myanmar) Khin Marlar Tun
- (Myanmar) Win Theingi Tun
- (Philippines) Sarina Bolden
- (Philippines) Malea Cesar
- (Philippines) Katrina Guillou
- (Philippines) Chandler McDaniel
- (Philippines) Jessica Miclat
- (Philippines) Quinley Quezada
- (South Korea) Cho So-hyun
- (South Korea) Choe Yu-ri
- (South Korea) Lee Geum-min
- (South Korea) Seo Ji-youn
- (South Korea) Son Hwa-yeon
- (Thailand) Irravadee Makris
- (Thailand) Nipawan Panyosuk
- (Vietnam) Chương Thị Kiều
- (Vietnam) Nguyễn Thị Bích Thùy
- (Vietnam) Thái Thị Thảo

1 own goal

- (Philippines) Dominique Randle (against Australia)
- (Vietnam) Trần Thị Phương Thảo (against South Korea)

== Qualified teams for FIFA Women's World Cup ==
Five teams from the AFC qualified for the 2023 FIFA Women's World Cup, apart from co-hosts Australia which qualified automatically, while two teams advanced to the inter-confederation play-offs.

Team	Qualified on	Previous appearances in FIFA Women's World Cup (Note: Italics indicates hosts for that year. Bold indicates champions for that year.)
Australia	25 June 2020	7 (1995 (Note: Australia qualified as a member of the OFC in 1995, 1999 and 2003.), 1999, 2003, 2007, 2011, 2015, 2019)
Japan	30 January 2022	8 (1991, 1995, 1999, 2003, 2007, **2011**, 2015, 2019)
South Korea	30 January 2022	3 (2003, 2015, 2019)
China	30 January 2022	7 (1991, 1995, 1999, 2003, 2007, 2015, 2019)
Philippines	30 January 2022	0 (debut)
Vietnam	6 February 2022	0 (debut)

== Marketing ==
=== Logo ===
The official logo for the tournament was unveiled by the AFC and the local organizing committee on 20 July 2021. The logo features the AFC Women's Asian Cup trophy at the center, with a "swirl" surrounding the trophy "inspired by the national flags and colors of playing kits in Asia, and the iconic stadiums in which the AFC Women’s Asian Cup is played in and celebrates cultural diversity and the unwavering support and enthusiasm of fans for their national teams". The logo also contains elements inspired by the tournament host country. The maroon colour of the logo is inspired by the art of the Warli people, a tribe native to the northern Western Ghats in the tournament's host state of Maharashtra. Red and maroon colours are often used as the base of Warli paintings. The use of silver in the logo is inspired by the "importance of silver jewelry in Indian households and the beauty and elegance of the precious metal".

=== Sponsorships ===
==== Official Global Partners ====
- Continental AG
- Credit Saison
- Neom
- Yili Group

==== Official Global Supporters ====
- Kelme
- Konami
- Molten Corporation

== Broadcasting rights ==
=== AFC ===
Territory	Rights holder(s)	Ref.
Australia	Paramount+; Network 10	
Mainland China	PPTV (all), CCTV+5 (Final only)	
India	Eurosport; JioTV	
Guam	CBS	
Japan	DAZN	
Indonesia	MNC	
Myanmar	Canal+	
Northern Mariana Islands	CBS	
Philippines	Eleven Sports	
South Korea	TVING	
Taiwan	ELTA TV	
Thailand	Eleven Sports	
Vietnam	FPT Telecom; VTV	

=== Rest of the world ===
Territory	Rights holder(s)	Ref.
Bermuda	CBS	
Canada	CBS	
Ireland	FreeSports	
New Zealand	Sky Sports 7 beIN Sports	
Oceania	Sky Sports 7 beIN Sports	
Sweden	C More	
Turkey	Spor Smart; D-Smart GO	
United Kingdom	FreeSports	
United States	CBS	
