= Nguyễn Thị Thanh Nhã =

Vietnamese footballer

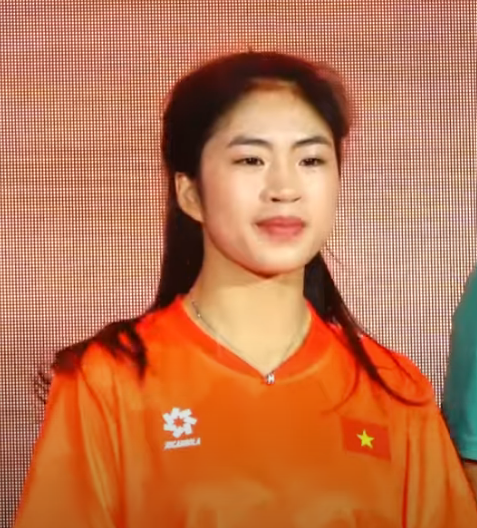
- Thanh Nhã in 2025

Personal information
- Date of birth: 25 September 2001 (age 25)
- Place of birth: Thường Tín, Hanoi, Vietnam
- Height: 1.62 m (5 ft 4 in)
- Position: Forward

Team information
- Current team: Hà Nội I
- Number: 19

Senior career*
Years	Team	Apps	(Gls)
2015–	Hà Nội I	47	(6)

International career^{‡}
2017–2021	Vietnam U20	4	(1)
2019–	Vietnam	35	(7)
- * Club domestic league appearances and goals ‡ National team caps and goals as of 25 June 2023

Nguyễn Thị Thanh Nhã (born 25 September 2001) is a Vietnamese footballer who plays as a forward for Vietnam Women's Championship club Hà Nội I and the Vietnam women's national team.

== Personal life ==
Her name, Thanh Nhã, means "elegant" or "graceful".

== International career ==
She represented Vietnam at the 2022 AFC Women's Asian Cup in India and won a gold medal at the 2021 SEA Games on home soil. On 23 September 2021, she scored her first brace against Maldives at the 2022 AFC Women's Asian Cup qualification.

== Career statistics ==
=== International appearances ===
As of match played 01 August 2023

Appearances and goals by national team and year
National Team	Year	Apps	Goals
Vietnam	2021	2	2
Vietnam	2022	17	1
Vietnam	2023	11	4
Total		30	7

=== International goals ===
Scores and results list Vietnam's goal tally first.

No.	Date	Venue	Opponent	Score	Result	Competition
1.	23 September 2021	Pamir Stadium, Dushanbe, Tajikistan	Maldives	1–0	16–0	2022 AFC Women's Asian Cup qualification
2.	23 September 2021	Pamir Stadium, Dushanbe, Tajikistan	Maldives	10–0	16–0	2022 AFC Women's Asian Cup qualification
3.	7 July 2022	Biñan Football Stadium, Biñan, Philippines	Cambodia	3–0	3–0	2022 AFF Women's Championship
4.	5 April 2023	Dasarath Rangasala, Kathmandu, Nepal	Nepal	5–1	5–1	2024 AFC Women's Olympic Qualifying Tournament
5.	6 May 2023	RCAF Old Stadium, Phnom Penh, Cambodia	Myanmar	2–1	3–1	2023 Southeast Asian Games
6.	15 May 2023	Olympic Stadium, Phnom Penh, Cambodia	Myanmar	2–0	2–0	2023 Southeast Asian Games
7.	24 June 2023	Sparda-Bank-Hessen-Stadion, Offenbach, Germany	Germany	1–2	1–2	Friendly
8.	14 September 2026	Shizuoka Stadium, Fukuroi, Japan	Chinese Taipei	1–2	1–2	2026 Asian Games

== Honours ==
Vietnam

- SEA Games: 2021, 2023
