= Yada Sengyong =

Thai footballer (born 1993)

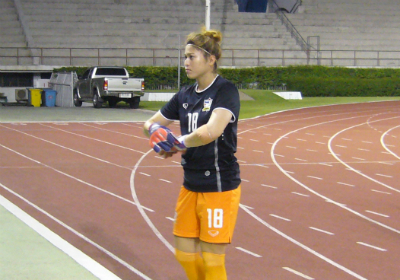
- Sengyong in 2015

Personal information
- Full name: Yada Sengyong
- Date of birth: 10 September 1993 (age 33)
- Place of birth: Krabi, Thailand
- Height: 1.72 m (5 ft 8 in)
- Position: Goalkeeper

Senior career*
Years	Team	Apps	(Gls)
????-2024	BG Bundit Asia	3	(0)

International career^{‡}
	Thailand	3	(0)
- * Club domestic league appearances and goals ‡ National team caps and goals as of 6 June 2015 (before the 2015 FIFA Women's World Cup)

Yada Sengyong (Thai: ญาดา เซ่งย่อง; born 10 September 1993) is a Thai footballer who plays as a goalkeeper for the Thailand women's national football team. She was part of the team at the 2015 FIFA Women's World Cup. On club level she plays for North Bangkok College in Thailand.
