= Bùi Thị Như =

Vietnamese footballer

Personal information
- Date of birth: 16 June 1990 (age 36)
- Place of birth: Kim Bảng, Hà Nam, Vietnam
- Height: 1.61 m (5 ft 3 in)
- Position: Defender

Team information
- Current team: Phong Phú Hà Nam
- Number: 6

Senior career*
Years	Team	Apps	(Gls)
2009–	Phong Phú Hà Nam	74	(19)

International career^{‡}
2010–2018	Vietnam	48	(0)
- * Club domestic league appearances and goals ‡ National team caps and goals as of 13 April 2018

Bùi Thị Như (born 16 June 1990) is a Vietnamese footballer who plays as a defender for Women's Championship club Phong Phú Hà Nam. She has been a member of the Vietnam women's national team.
