= Zin Mar Win =

Burmese footballer

Personal information
- Date of birth: 2 January 1990 (age 36)
- Place of birth: Kyangin, Myanmar
- Position: Defender

International career^{‡}
| Years | Team | Apps | (Gls) |
| 2009 | Myanmar U19 | | (2) |
| 2014–2017 | Myanmar | 7 | (0) |
- ‡ National team caps and goals as of 11 April 2017

Zin Mar Win (born 2 January 1990) is a Burmese footballer who plays as a defender. She has been a member of the Myanmar women's national team.

== See also ==
- List of Myanmar women's international footballers
