= Yui Narumiya =

Japanese footballer

Personal information
- Date of birth: 22 February 1995 (age 31)
- Place of birth: Kyoto, Kyoto Prefecture, Japan
- Height: 1.54 m (5 ft 1 in)
- Position: Midfielder

Team information
- Current team: INAC Kobe Leonessa
- Number: 10

Senior career*
Years	Team	Apps	(Gls)
2018-2021	JEF United Chiba	?	(?)
2021-	INAC Kobe Leonessa	27	(8)

International career^{‡}
2012	Japan U-17	4	(3)
2021–	Japan	19	(6)
- * Club domestic league appearances and goals as of 20 September 2023 (UTC) ‡ National team caps and goals as of 30 September 2026

Yui Narumiya (born 22 February 1995) is a Japanese professional footballer who plays as a midfielder for WE League club INAC Kobe Leonessa.

== Club career ==
Narumiya made her WE League debut on 12 September 2021.

== Career statistics ==
=== International ===
National Team	Year	Apps	Goals
Japan
Japan	2021	1	0
Japan	2022	8	4
Japan	2025	4	1
Japan	2026	6	1
Total		19	6

== International goals ==
No.	Date	Venue	Opponent	Score	Result	Competition
1.	21 January 2022	Shree Shiv Chhatrapati Sports Complex, Pune, India	Myanmar	4–0	5–0	2022 AFC Women's Asian Cup
2.	24 January 2022	Shree Shiv Chhatrapati Sports Complex, Pune, India	Vietnam	1–0	3–0	2022 AFC Women's Asian Cup
3.	24 January 2022	Shree Shiv Chhatrapati Sports Complex, Pune, India	Vietnam	3–0	3–0	2022 AFC Women's Asian Cup
4.	24 June 2022	Serbian FA Sports Center, Stara Pazova, Serbia	Serbia	5–0	5–0	Friendly
5.	13 July 2025	Hwaseong Stadium, Hwaseong, South Korea	South Korea	1–0	1–1	2025 EAFF E-1 Football Championship
6.	17 September 2026	Shizuoka Stadium, Fukuroi, Japan	Vietnam	7–0	8–0	2026 Asian Games
