= Khin Moe Wai =

Burmese footballer

Personal information
- Full name: Khin Moe Wai
- Date of birth: December 16, 1989 (age 36)
- Place of birth: Mawlamyine, Myanmar
- Position: Midfielder

Team information
- Current team: Thitsar Arman
- Number: 11

Senior career*
Years	Team	Apps	(Gls)
2016–	Thitsar Arman	9	(20)

International career^{‡}
2010–	Myanmar	136	(47)
- * Club domestic league appearances and goals ‡ National team caps and goals as of 09:27, 22 March 2015 (UTC)

Khin Moe Wai is a footballer from Myanmar who currently plays as a midfielder.

== International goals ==
No.	Date	Venue	Opponent	Score	Result	Competition
1.	21 May 2013	Faisal Al-Husseini International Stadium, Al-Ram, Palestine	India	2–0	2–0	2014 AFC Women's Asian Cup qualification
2.	23 May 2013	Faisal Al-Husseini International Stadium, Al-Ram, Palestine	Palestine	1–0	9–0	2014 AFC Women's Asian Cup qualification
3.	23 May 2013	Faisal Al-Husseini International Stadium, Al-Ram, Palestine	Palestine	3–0	9–0	2014 AFC Women's Asian Cup qualification
4.	8 November 2018	Thuwunna Stadium, Yangon, Myanmar	Bangladesh	3–0	5–0	2020 AFC Women's Olympic Qualifying Tournament
5.	11 November 2018	Thuwunna Stadium, Yangon, Myanmar	Nepal	1–1	1–1	2020 AFC Women's Olympic Qualifying Tournament
6.	20 November 2018	Thuwunna Stadium, Yangon, Myanmar	Chinese Taipei	1–0	1–0	Friendly
7.	9 February 2019	Kalinga Stadium, Bhubaneswar, India	Nepal	1–0	3–0	2019 Gold Cup
8.	9 February 2019	Kalinga Stadium, Bhubaneswar, India	Nepal	3–0	3–0	2019 Gold Cup
9.	16 August 2019	IPE Chonburi Stadium, Chonburi, Thailand	Indonesia	4–0	7–0	2019 AFF Women's Championship
10.	18 August 2019	IPE Chonburi Stadium, Chonburi, Thailand	Cambodia	5–0	10–1	2019 AFF Women's Championship
11.	9 July 2022	Biñan Football Stadium, Biñan, Philippines	Cambodia	3–0	3–0	2022 AFF Women's Championship

== See also ==
- List of Myanmar women's international footballers
