= Le Le Hlaing =

Burmese footballer

Personal information
- Full name: Le Le Hlaing
- Date of birth: 24 March 1997 (age 29)
- Place of birth: Kyangin, Myanmar
- Position: Midfielder

Team information
- Current team: Ayeyawady
- Number: 11

Senior career*
| Years | Team | Apps | (Gls) |
| 2023 | Yangon United | | |
| 2024– | Ayeyawady | | |

International career^{‡}
| 2017–2019 | Myanmar | 13 | (1) |
- * Club domestic league appearances and goals ‡ National team caps and goals as of 9 April 2019

Le Le Hlaing (born 24 March 1997) is a Burmese footballer who plays as a midfielder. She has been a member of the Myanmar women's national team.

== International career ==
Le Le Hlaing represented Myanmar at the 2013 AFC U-16 Women's Championship and two AFC U-19 Women's Championship editions (2013 and 2015). She capped at senior level during the 2018 AFC Women's Asian Cup qualification and the 2020 AFC Women's Olympic Qualifying Tournament (first round and second round).

== International goals ==
Scores and results list Myanmar's goal tally first.

| No. | Date | Venue | Opponent | Score | Result | Competition |
|---|---|---|---|---|---|---|
| 1. | 8 November 2018 | Thuwunna Stadium, Yangon, Myanmar | Bangladesh | 4–0 | 5–0 | 2020 AFC Women's Olympic Qualifying Tournament |

== Honours ==
Ayeyawady

- Myanmar Women League: 2025-26

== See also ==
- List of Myanmar women's international footballers
