= Zar Zar Myint =

Burmese footballer

Personal information
- Date of birth: 5 June 1993 (age 33)
- Place of birth: Kengtung, Myanmar
- Position: Goalkeeper

International career^{‡}
Years	Team	Apps	(Gls)
2018–2019	Myanmar	8	(0)
- ‡ National team caps and goals as of 23 March 2019

Zar Zar Myint (Burmese: ဇာဇာမြင့်; born 5 June 1993) is a Burmese footballer who plays as a goalkeeper. She has been a member of the Myanmar women's national team.

== International career ==
Zar Zar Myint represented Myanmar at the 2009 AFC U-16 Women's Championship and the 2011 AFC U-19 Women's Championship. She capped at senior level during the 2020 AFC Women's Olympic Qualifying Tournament (first round).
