= Naw Ar Lo Wer Phaw =

Burmese footballer

Personal information
- Full name: Naw Ar Lo Wer Phaw
- Date of birth: 11 August 1988 (age 38)
- Place of birth: Demoso, Myanmar
- Height: 1.64 m (5 ft 5 in)
- Position: Striker

International career^{‡}
Years	Team	Apps	(Gls)
2010–	Myanmar	77	(35)
- ‡ National team caps and goals as of 09:27, 22 March 2015 (UTC)

Naw Ar Lo Wer Phaw (Burmese: နော်အားလိုဝါးဖော်) is a footballer from Myanmar who currently plays as a forward.

== International goals ==
No.	Date	Venue	Opponent	Score	Result	Competition
1.	19 October 2011	New Laos National Stadium, Vientiane, Laos	Malaysia	3–0	8–0	2011 AFF Women's Championship
2.	23 October 2011	New Laos National Stadium, Vientiane, Laos	Vietnam	2–1	2–1	2011 AFF Women's Championship
3.	21 May 2013	Faisal Al-Husseini International Stadium, Al-Ram, Palestine	India	1–0	2–0	2014 AFC Women's Asian Cup qualification
4.	11 March 2015	Mandalarthiri Stadium, Mandalay, Myanmar	Sri Lanka	1–0	16–0	2016 AFC Women's Olympic Qualifying Tournament
5.	11 March 2015	Mandalarthiri Stadium, Mandalay, Myanmar	Sri Lanka	2–0	16–0	2016 AFC Women's Olympic Qualifying Tournament
6.	11 March 2015	Mandalarthiri Stadium, Mandalay, Myanmar	Sri Lanka	11–0	16–0	2016 AFC Women's Olympic Qualifying Tournament
7.	15 March 2015	Mandalarthiri Stadium, Mandalay, Myanmar	India	3–0	7–0	2016 AFC Women's Olympic Qualifying Tournament
8.	2 May 2015	Thống Nhất Stadium, Hồ Chí Minh City, Vietnam	Vietnam	2–1	2–3	2015 AFF Women's Championship
9.	4 May 2015	Thống Nhất Stadium, Hồ Chí Minh City, Vietnam	Philippines	1–1	4–1	2015 AFF Women's Championship
10.	4 May 2015	Thống Nhất Stadium, Hồ Chí Minh City, Vietnam	Philippines	2–1	4–1	2015 AFF Women's Championship
11.	4 May 2015	Thống Nhất Stadium, Hồ Chí Minh City, Vietnam	Philippines	4–1	4–1	2015 AFF Women's Championship
12.	7 April 2017	Vietnam YFT Center, Hanoi, Vietnam	Syria	1–0	14–0	2018 AFC Women's Asian Cup qualification
13.	7 April 2017	Vietnam YFT Center, Hanoi, Vietnam	Syria	6–0	14–0	2018 AFC Women's Asian Cup qualification
14.	7 April 2017	Vietnam YFT Center, Hanoi, Vietnam	Syria	14–0	14–0	2018 AFC Women's Asian Cup qualification
15.	22 August 2017	UM Arena Stadium, Kuala Lumpur, Malaysia	Philippines	4–0	6–0	2017 Southeast Asian Games
16.	1 July 2018	Gelora Sriwijaya Stadium, Palembang, Indonesia	Philippines	1–0	4–0	2018 AFF Women's Championship

== See also ==
- List of Myanmar women's international footballers
