= May Sabai Phoo =

Burmese footballer

Personal information
- Date of birth: 31 July 1996 (age 30)
- Place of birth: Yangon, Myanmar
- Position: Midfielder

Team information
- Current team: Thitsar Arman W.F.C
- Number: 13

Senior career*
Years	Team	Apps	(Gls)
2019-	Thitsar Arman W.F.C		

International career^{‡}
- Myanmar U19
2014–2018	Myanmar	3+	(0+)
- * Club domestic league appearances and goals ‡ National team caps and goals as of 13 November 2018

May Sabai Phoo (born 31 July 1996) is a Burmese footballer who plays as a midfielder. She has been a member of the Myanmar women's national team.

== International career ==
May Sabai Phoo represented Myanmar at the 2015 AFC U-19 Women's Championship. At senior level, she capped during the 2014 AFC Women's Asian Cup and the 2016 AFF Women's Championship.

== See also ==
- List of Myanmar women's international footballers
