= Nu Nu (footballer) =

Burmese footballer

Personal information
- Date of birth: 1 April 1999 (age 27)
- Place of birth: Pwintbyu, Myanmar
- Position: Midfielder

International career^{‡}
Years	Team	Apps	(Gls)
2016	Myanmar U19	3	(3)
2018–	Myanmar	25	(5)
- ‡ National team caps and goals as of 6 February 2020

Nu Nu (Burmese: နုနု; born 1 April 1999) is a Burmese footballer who plays as a midfielder for the Myanmar women's national team.

== International goals ==
Scores and results list Myanmar's goal tally first.

No.	Date	Venue	Opponent	Score	Result	Competition
1.	12 June 2018	Bangkokthonburi University Stadium, Bangkok, Thailand	Thailand	1–2	1–2	Friendly
2.	27 August 2019	IPE Chonburi Stadium, Chonburi, Thailand	Philippines	2–0	3–0	2019 AFF Women's Championship
3.	27 August 2019	IPE Chonburi Stadium, Chonburi, Thailand	Philippines	3–0	3–0	2019 AFF Women's Championship
4.	28 January 2020	Mandalarthiri Stadium, Mandalay, Myanmar	Thailand	1–0	1–1	Friendly
