= Than Than Htwe =

Burmese footballer

Personal information
- Full name: Than Than Htwe
- Date of birth: 24 July 1986 (age 40)
- Place of birth: Nyaungdon Township, Myanmar
- Position: Midfielder

Team information
- Current team: Zwekapin FC
- Number: 7

Senior career*
Years	Team	Apps	(Gls)
2016– present	Zwekapin FC	1	(0)

International career^{‡}
2009– 2015	Myanmar	8	(2)
- * Club domestic league appearances and goals as of 12 December 2016 ‡ National team caps and goals as of 19:03, 1 October 2015 (UTC)

Than Than Htwe is a retired footballer from Myanmar who played for the Myanmar women's national football team as a midfielder. She played for the Myanmar women's national football team for about 15 years and retired in 2015 due to her age and injury. She was well known for her accurate long shots. She scored her last goal for Myanmar women's national football team in the match against Chinese Taipei women's national football team on 22 September 2015 in the 2015–16 AFC Women's Olympic Qualifying Tournament. Than Than Htwe along with a Myanmar footballer Kyaw Ko Ko are part of the ‘Protect the Goal’ for Myanmar athletes to raise awareness in Burma on HIV/AIDS and prevention.
