= Wai Wai Aung =

Burmese footballer

Personal information
- Date of birth: 5 October 1993 (age 33)
- Place of birth: Bago, Myanmar
- Position: Defender

International career^{‡}
Years	Team	Apps	(Gls)
2017–	Myanmar	18	(5)
- ‡ National team caps and goals as of 28 January 2020

Wai Wai Aung (Burmese: ဝေဝေအောင်; born 5 October 1993) is a Burmese footballer who plays as a defender for the Myanmar women's national team.

== International goals ==
No.	Date	Venue	Opponent	Score	Result	Competition
1.	18 September 2015	Mandalarthiri Stadium, Mandalay, Myanmar	Vietnam	1–4	2–4	2016 AFC Women's Olympic Qualifying Tournament
2.	27 July 2016	Mandalarthiri Stadium, Mandalay, Myanmar	Timor-Leste	15–0	17–0	2016 AFF Women's Championship
3.	27 July 2016	Mandalarthiri Stadium, Mandalay, Myanmar	Timor-Leste	17–0	17–0	2016 AFF Women's Championship
4.	7 April 2017	Vietnam YTF Center, Hanoi, Vietnam	Syria	10–0	14–0	2018 AFC Women's Asian Cup qualification
5.	9 April 2017	Vietnam YTF Center, Hanoi, Vietnam	Singapore	2–0	6–0	2018 AFC Women's Asian Cup qualification
6.	9 April 2017	Vietnam YTF Center, Hanoi, Vietnam	Singapore	5–0	6–0	2018 AFC Women's Asian Cup qualification
