= July Kyaw =

Burmese footballer (born 1999)

Personal information
- Date of birth: 21 July 1999 (age 27)
- Place of birth: Yangon, Myanmar
- Height: 1.66 m (5 ft 5 in)
- Position: Forward

Senior career*
Years	Team	Apps	(Gls)
2017 –2024	Thitsar Arman	6	(10)
2025	Shan United W.F.C		

International career^{‡}
2016	Myanmar U19	3	(9)
2017–	Myanmar	70	(13)
- * Club domestic league appearances and goals ‡ National team caps and goals as of 30 Sep 2023

July Kyaw (Burmese: ဇူလိုင်ကျော်း; born 21 July 1999) is a Burmese footballer who plays as a forward for the Myanmar women's national team.

== Club ==
After a one-year injury layoff, July Kyaw made her first appearance for Shan United W.F.C. in a match against the Young Lionesses.

== International goals ==
No.	Date	Venue	Opponent	Score	Result	Competition
1.	3 April 2017	Vietnam YTF Center, Hanoi, Vietnam	Iran	1–0	2–0	2018 AFC Women's Asian Cup qualification
2.	12 June 2018	Bangkokthonburi University Stadium, Bangkok, Thailand	Thailand	1–1	1–1	Friendly
2.	1 July 2018	Gelora Sriwijaya Stadium, Palembang, Indonesia	Philippines	4–0	4–0	2018 AFF Women's Championship
3.	5 July 2018	Gelora Sriwijaya Stadium, Palembang, Indonesia	Indonesia	6–1	6–1	2018 AFF Women's Championship
4.	7 July 2018	Gelora Sriwijaya Stadium, Palembang, Indonesia	Singapore	6–0	7–0	2018 AFF Women's Championship
5.	13 February 2019	Kalinga Stadium, Bhubaneswar, India	India	1–0	2–0	2019 Gold Cup
6.	2 December 2019	Biñan Football Stadium, Biñan, Philippines	Malaysia	5–0	5–0	2019 Southeast Asian Games
7.	18 October 2021	Dolen Omurzakov Stadium, Bishkek, Kyrgyzstan	Lebanon	4–0	4–0	2022 AFC Women's Asian Cup qualification
8.	21 October 2021	Dolen Omurzakov Stadium, Bishkek, Kyrgyzstan	Guam	8–0	8–0	2022 AFC Women's Asian Cup qualification
9.	5 July 2022	Biñan Football Stadium, Biñan, Philippines	Timor-Leste	2–0	7–0	2022 AFF Women's Championship
10.	5 July 2022	Biñan Football Stadium, Biñan, Philippines	Timor-Leste	3–0	7–0	2022 AFF Women's Championship
11.	11 July 2022	Biñan Football Stadium, Biñan, Philippines	Laos	3–0	3–1	2022 AFF Women's Championship
12.	9 May 2023	RCAF Old Stadium, Phnom Penh, Cambodia	Malaysia	1–0	5–1	2023 Southeast Asian Games
13.	9 May 2023	RCAF Old Stadium, Phnom Penh, Cambodia	Malaysia	3–0	5–1	2023 Southeast Asian Games

== See also ==
- List of Myanmar women's international footballers
