= Khin Mo Mo Tun =

Burmese footballer

Personal information
- Date of birth: 3 June 1999 (age 27)
- Place of birth: Yangon, Myanmar
- Height: 1.55 m (5 ft 1 in)
- Position: Midfielder

Team information
- Current team: Thitsar Arman W.F.C
- Number: 70

Senior career*
Years	Team	Apps	(Gls)
2017–	Thitsar Arman	9	(2)

International career^{‡}
2016	Myanmar U19	3	(0)
2016–	Myanmar	76	(5)
- * Club domestic league appearances and goals ‡ National team caps and goals as of 30 Sep 2023

Khin Mo Mo Tun (Burmese: ခင်မိုမိုထွန်း; born 3 June 1999) is a Burmese footballer who plays as a midfielder for the Myanmar women's national team.

== International goals ==
No.	Date	Venue	Opponent	Score	Result	Competition
1.	27 July 2016	Mandalarthiri Stadium, Mandalay, Myanmar	Timor-Leste	8–0	17–0	2016 AFF Women's Championship
2.	21 October 2021	Dolen Omurzakov Stadium, Bishkek, Kyrgyzstan	Guam	4–0	8–0	2022 AFC Women's Asian Cup qualification
3.	24 October 2021	Dolen Omurzakov Stadium, Bishkek, Kyrgyzstan	United Arab Emirates	1–0	2–0	2022 AFC Women's Asian Cup qualification
4.	29 June 2025	Thuwunna Stadium, Yangon, Myanmar	Turkmenistan	4–0	8–0	2026 AFC Women's Asian Cup qualification
5.	29 June 2025	Thuwunna Stadium, Yangon, Myanmar	Turkmenistan	7–0	8–0	2026 AFC Women's Asian Cup qualification
6.	5 July 2025	Thuwunna Stadium, Yangon, Myanmar	Bahrain	3–0	6–0	2026 AFC Women's Asian Cup qualification

== See also ==
- List of Myanmar women's international footballers
