= Khin Than Wai =

Burmese footballer

Personal information
- Date of birth: 2 November 1995 (age 31)
- Place of birth: Mawlamyine, Myanmar
- Position: Defender

Team information
- Current team: ISPE W.F.C

International career^{‡}
Years	Team	Apps	(Gls)
2014–	Myanmar	26	(0)
- ‡ National team caps and goals as of 28 January 2020

Khin Than Wai (Burmese: ခင်သန်းဝေ; born 2 November 1995) is a Burmese footballer who plays as a defender for the Myanmar women's national team.

== See also ==
- List of Myanmar women's international footballers
