= Chit Chit =

Burmese footballer

Personal information
- Date of birth: 18 October 1996 (age 30)
- Place of birth: Phakant, Myanmar
- Position: Defender

International career^{‡}
Years	Team	Apps	(Gls)
2019–	Myanmar	15	(0)
- ‡ National team caps and goals as of 6 February 2020

Chit Chit (Burmese: ချစ်ချစ်; born 18 October 1996) is a Burmese footballer who plays as a defender for the Myanmar women's national team.

== International goals ==
No.	Date	Venue	Opponent	Score	Result	Competition
1.	24 October 2021	Dolen Omurzakov Stadium, Bishkek, Kyrgyzstan	United Arab Emirates	2–0	2–0	2022 AFC Women's Asian Cup qualification

== See also ==
- List of Myanmar women's international footballers
