= 2022 AFC Women's Asian Cup knockout stage =

Knockout stage of the 2022 AFC Women's Asian Cup

The knockout stage of 2022 AFC Women's Asian Cup began on 30 January 2022 with the quarter-finals and ended on 6 February 2022 with the final in Navi Mumbai, India.

Times listed are Indian Standard Time (UTC+5:30).

== Format ==
In the knockout phase, if a match is level at the end of 90 minutes of normal playing time, extra time is played (two periods of 15 minutes each), where each team is allowed to make a fourth substitution. If still tied after extra time, the match is decided by a penalty shoot-out to determine the winners. From this tournament, there will be no third place play-off.

== Qualified teams ==
The top two placed teams from each of the three groups, along with the two best-placed third teams, will qualify for the knockout stage.

Group	Winners	Runners-up	Third-placed teams (Best two qualify)
A	China	Chinese Taipei	
B	Australia	Philippines	Thailand (Note: Due to non-compliance with conditions set by the World Anti-Doping Agency (WADA), Thailand was not allowed to be represented by their national flag. The sanctions took effect in October 2021. Thailand was represented by its national team logo. Sanctions were lifted on 4 February and Thailand was able to use their flag in time for their last playoff match against Chinese Taipei.)
C	Japan	South Korea	Vietnam

== Bracket ==
Quarter-finals
30 January – Navi Mumbai
China	3
Vietnam	1
30 January – Navi Mumbai
Japan	7
Thailand	0
30 January – Pune
Australia	0
South Korea	1
30 January – Pune
Chinese Taipei	1 (3)
Philippines (p)	1 (4)

Semi-finals
3 February – Pune
China (p)	2 (4)
Japan	2 (3)
3 February – Pune
South Korea	2
Philippines	0

Final
6 February – Navi Mumbai
China	3
South Korea	2

== Quarter-finals ==
The winners qualified for the 2023 FIFA Women's World Cup, while the losers, with the exception of Australia, entered the play-offs.

=== China PR vs Vietnam ===
30 January 2022
17:30

China	3–1	Vietnam
Wang Shuang 25'; Wang Shanshan 52'; Tang Jiali 53'	Report (FIFA); Report (AFC)	Nguyễn Thị Tuyết Dung 11'

DY Patil Stadium, Navi Mumbai
Attendance: 0
Referee: Oh Hyeon-jeong (South Korea)

China PR

Team stats
China PR	Statistic	Vietnam
21	Shots	6
9	Shots on target	1
69%	Possession	31%
475	Passes	224
83%	Pass accuracy	57%
13	Fouls	6
2	Yellow cards	1
0	Red cards	0
6	Offsides	1
7	Corners	0

Vietnam

GK	1	Zhu Yu
RB	2	Li Mengwen	(yellow card) 88'
CB	3	Wang Xiaoxue
CB	4	Li Jiayue
LB	8	Yao Wei
RM	7	Wang Shuang
CM	10	Zhang Rui		(substituted off) 63'
CM	13	Yang Lina		(substituted off) 74'
LM	6	Zhang Xin		(substituted off) 84'
CF	11	Wang Shanshan (c)		(substituted off) 74'
CF	18	Tang Jiali		(substituted off) 84'
Substitutions:
MF	16	Yao Lingwei	(yellow card) 82'	(substituted on) 63'
MF	5	Ma Jun		(substituted on) 74'
MF	15	Wu Chengshu		(substituted on) 74'
MF	17	Liu Yanqiu		(substituted on) 84'
FW	19	Zhang Linyan		(substituted on) 84'
Manager:
Shui Qingxia

GK	14	Trần Thị Kim Thanh
RB	17	Trần Thị Phương Thảo
CB	2	Lương Thị Thu Thương
CB	13	Lê Thị Diễm My		(substituted off) 35'
LB	22	Nguyễn Thị Mỹ Anh		(substituted off) 66'
DM	6	Phạm Hoàng Quỳnh		(substituted off) 66'
RM	23	Nguyễn Thị Bích Thùy	(yellow card) 38'
CM	11	Thái Thị Thảo
CM	18	Nguyễn Thị Vạn		(substituted off) 35'
LM	12	Phạm Hải Yến (c)
CF	7	Nguyễn Thị Tuyết Dung		(substituted off) 81'
Substitutions:
DF	3	Chương Thị Kiều		(substituted on) 35'
FW	9	Huỳnh Như		(substituted on) 35'
MF	8	Trần Thị Thùy Trang		(substituted on) 66'
FW	19	Nguyễn Thị Thanh Nhã	(yellow card) 74'	(substituted on) 66'
MF	21	Ngân Thị Vạn Sự		(substituted on) 81'
Manager:
Mai Đức Chung

Assistant referees:
Kim Kyoung-min (South Korea)
Lee Seul-gi (South Korea)
Fourth official:
Kim Yu-jeong (South Korea)
Reserve assistant referee:
Heba Saadieh (Palestine)
Video assistant referee:
Abdulla Al-Marri (Qatar)
Assistant video assistant referee:
Kim Hee-gon (South Korea)

=== Australia vs South Korea ===
30 January 2022
13:30

Australia	0–1	South Korea
	Report (FIFA); Report (AFC)	Ji So-yun 87'

Shiv Chhatrapati Sports Complex, Pune
Attendance: 0
Referee: Qin Liang (China PR)

Australia

Team stats
Australia	Statistic	South Korea
15	Shots	7
2	Shots on target	3
65%	Possession	35%
430	Passes	232
78%	Pass accuracy	57%
12	Fouls	8
0	Yellow cards	1
0	Red cards	0
3	Offsides	3
4	Corners	1

South Korea

GK	1	Lydia Williams
RB	21	Ellie Carpenter
CB	14	Alanna Kennedy
CB	4	Clare Polkinghorne
LB	7	Steph Catley (c)	(substituted off) 46'
CM	10	Emily van Egmond
CM	6	Clare Wheeler	(substituted off) 56'
RW	17	Kyah Simon
AM	11	Mary Fowler
LW	9	Caitlin Foord	(substituted off) 90'
CF	20	Sam Kerr
Substitutions:
DF	5	Cortnee Vine	(substituted on) 56'	(substituted off) 90+1'
FW	15	Emily Gielnik	(substituted on) 90'
FW	16	Hayley Raso	(substituted on) 90+1'
Manager:
(Sweden) Tony Gustavsson

GK	18	Kim Jung-mi
RB	20	Kim Hye-ri (c)
CB	6	Lim Seon-joo
CB	4	Shim Seo-yeon
LB	2	Choo Hyo-joo
DM	17	Lee Young-ju
CM	8	Cho So-hyun
CM	10	Ji So-yun		(substituted off) 90'
RW	11	Choe Yu-ri		(substituted off) 77'
LW	13	Lee Geum-min	(yellow card) 90+1'
CF	23	Son Hwa-yeon		(substituted off) 85'
Substitutions:
MF	7	Lee Min-a		(substituted on) 77'
FW	9	Yeo Min-ji		(substituted on) 85'
MF	15	Park Ye-eun		(substituted on) 90'
Manager:
(England) Colin Bell

Assistant referees:
Fang Yan (China PR)
Xie Lijun (China PR)
Fourth official:
Pansa Chaisanit (Thailand)
Reserve assistant referee:
Supawan Hinthong (Thailand)
Video assistant referee:
Sivakorn Pu-Udom (Thailand)
Assistant video assistant referee:
Hanna Hattab (Syria)

=== Japan vs Thailand ===
30 January 2022
13:30

Japan	7–0	Thailand
Sugasawa 27', 65' (pen.), 80', 83'; Miyazawa 45+2'; Sumida 48'; Ueki 75'	Report (FIFA); Report (AFC)

DY Patil Stadium, Navi Mumbai
Attendance: 0
Referee: Casey Reibelt (Australia)

Japan

Team stats
Japan	Statistic	Thailand
30	Shots	2
11	Shots on target	0
74%	Possession	26%
578	Passes	215
86%	Pass accuracy	55%
7	Fouls	7
0	Yellow cards	2
0	Red cards	0
3	Offsides	0
16	Corners	0

Thailand

GK	18	Ayaka Yamashita
RB	2	Risa Shimizu
CB	4	Saki Kumagai (c)
CB	3	Moeka Minami
LB	6	Asato Miyagawa
RM	14	Yui Hasegawa	(substituted off) 46'
CM	15	Fuka Nagano	(substituted off) 58'
CM	7	Rin Sumida
LM	23	Hinata Miyazawa	(substituted off) 69'
CF	10	Mana Iwabuchi	(substituted off) 46'
CF	11	Mina Tanaka	(substituted off) 9'
Substitutions:
FW	9	Yuika Sugasawa	(substituted on) 9'
MF	8	Hikaru Naomoto	(substituted on) 46'
FW	19	Riko Ueki	(substituted on) 46'
MF	16	Honoka Hayashi	(substituted on) 58'
DF	22	Saori Takarada	(substituted on) 69'
Manager:
Futoshi Ikeda

GK	1	Waraporn Boonsing
CB	5	Amornrat Utchai
CB	2	Kanjanaporn Saenkhun
CB	4	Phornphirun Philawan
RM	23	Miranda Nild	(yellow card) 51'	(substituted off) 84'
CM	20	Wilaiporn Boothduang
CM	15	Orapin Waenngoen
LM	14	Saowalak Pengngam	(yellow card) 40'
AM	7	Silawan Intamee (c)
AM	3	Irravadee Makris
CF	19	Pitsamai Sornsai
Substitutions:
MF	21	Chatchawan Rodthong		(substituted on) 84'
Assistant coach:
(Japan) Natsuko Todoroki

Assistant referees:
Ramina Tsoi (Kyrgyzstan)
Joanna Charaktis (Australia)
Fourth official:
Ranjita Devi Tekcham (India)
Reserve assistant referee:
Merlo Albano (Philippines)
Video assistant referee:
Kate Jacewicz (Australia)
Assistant video assistant referee:
Lara Lee (Australia)

=== Chinese Taipei vs Philippines ===
30 January 2022
19:30

Chinese Taipei	1–1 (a.e.t.)	Philippines
Zhuo Li-ping 82'	Report (FIFA); Report (AFC)	Quezada 49'
Penalties
Ting Chi (penalty scored); Wang Hsiang-huei (penalty scored); Chen Ying-hui (penalty scored); Hsu Yi-yun (penalty missed); Su Hsin-yun (penalty missed); Zhuo Li-ping (penalty missed)	3–4	(penalty scored) S. Castañeda; (penalty scored) Annis; (penalty missed) Miclat; (penalty missed) Long; (penalty scored) O. McDaniel; (penalty scored) Bolden

Shiv Chhatrapati Sports Complex, Pune
Attendance: 0
Referee: Thein Thein Aye (Myanmar)

Chinese Taipei

Team stats
Chinese Taipei	Statistic	Philippines
11	Shots	25
3	Shots on target	13
44%	Possession	56%
372	Passes	458
51%	Pass accuracy	60%
10	Fouls	12
0	Yellow cards	0
0	Red cards	0
1	Offsides	2
4	Corners	7

Philippines

GK	18	Cheng Ssu-yu
CB	4	Lai Wei-ju	(substituted off) 79'
CB	15	Su Hsin-yun
CB	16	Chang Su-hsin	(substituted off) 102'
RWB	6	Zhuo Li-ping
LWB	5	Pan Shin-yu
RM	10	Lee Hsiu-chin	(substituted off) 70'
CM	9	Hsu Yi-yun
CM	8	Wang Hsiang-huei (c)
LM	7	Chen Yen-ping
CF	19	Su Yu-hsuan	(substituted off) 102'
Substitutions:
MF	17	Ting Chi	(substituted on) 70'
MF	13	Pan Yen-hsin	(substituted on) 79'
FW	3	Lin Hsin-hui	(substituted on) 102'
DF	20	Chen Ying-hui	(substituted on) 102'
Manager:
(Japan) Kazuo Echigo

GK	23	Olivia McDaniel
RB	19	Eva Madarang
CB	5	Hali Long (c)
CB	3	Dominique Randle
LB	16	Sofia Harrison
CM	9	Jessica Miclat
CM	10	Ryley Bugay
RW	8	Chandler McDaniel	(substituted off) 100'
AM	21	Katrina Guillou	(substituted off) 110'
LW	18	Sarina Bolden
CF	20	Quinley Quezada	(substituted off) 72'
Substitutions:
MF	6	Tahnai Annis	(substituted on) 72'
MF	15	Carleigh Frilles	(substituted on) 100'
MF	12	Sara Castañeda	(substituted on) 110'
Manager:
(Australia) Alen Stajcic

Assistant referees:
Makoto Bozono (Japan)
Naomi Teshirogi (Japan)
Fourth official:
Edita Mirabidova (Uzbekistan)
Reserve assistant referee:
Trương Thị Lệ Trinh (Vietnam)
Video assistant referee:
Omar Al-Ali (United Arab Emirates)
Assistant video assistant referee:
Ali Sabah (Iraq)

== Semi-finals ==
=== China PR vs Japan ===
3 February 2022
19:30

China	2–2 (a.e.t.)	Japan
Wu Chengshu 46'; Wang Shanshan 119'	Report (FIFA); Report (AFC)	Ueki 26', 103'
Penalties
Zhang Xin (penalty missed); Zhang Rui (penalty scored); Yang Lina (penalty scored); Gao Chen (penalty scored); Wang Shanshan (penalty scored)	4–3	(penalty missed) Kumagai; (penalty scored) Hasegawa; (penalty scored) Shimizu; (penalty scored) Nagano; (penalty missed) Minami

Shiv Chhatrapati Sports Complex, Pune
Attendance: 0
Referee: Lara Lee (Australia)

China PR

Team stats
China PR	Statistic	Japan
7	Shots	22
2	Shots on target	6
33%	Possession	67%
421	Passes	834
65%	Pass accuracy	81%
7	Fouls	10
0	Yellow cards	0
0	Red cards	0
3	Offsides	2
2	Corners	9

Japan

GK	1	Zhu Yu
RB	14	Lou Jiahui	(substituted off) 66'
CB	3	Wang Xiaoxue
CB	11	Wang Shanshan (c)
LB	8	Yao Wei
RM	15	Wu Chengshu	(substituted off) 81'
CM	16	Yao Lingwei	(substituted off) 110'
CM	5	Ma Jun	(substituted off) 46'
LM	6	Zhang Xin
CF	18	Tang Jiali	(substituted off) 110'
CF	19	Zhang Linyan	(substituted off) 46'
Substitutions:
MF	10	Zhang Rui	(substituted on) 46'
FW	20	Xiao Yuyi	(substituted on) 46'
MF	23	Gao Chen	(substituted on) 66'
MF	9	Wang Yanwen	(substituted on) 81'
MF	13	Yang Lina	(substituted on) 110'
FW	21	Li Ying	(substituted on) 110'
Manager:
Shui Qingxia

GK	18	Ayaka Yamashita
RB	2	Risa Shimizu
CB	4	Saki Kumagai (c)
CB	3	Moeka Minami
LB	12	Ruka Norimatsu
CM	14	Yui Hasegawa
CM	15	Fuka Nagano
CM	23	Hinata Miyazawa	(substituted off) 98'
AM	16	Honoka Hayashi
CF	10	Mana Iwabuchi	(substituted off) 64'
CF	19	Riko Ueki	(substituted off) 112'
Substitutions:
MF	13	Jun Endo	(substituted on) 64'
MF	17	Yui Narumiya	(substituted on) 98'
DF	20	Hana Takahashi	(substituted on) 112'
Manager:
Futoshi Ikeda

Assistant referees:
Joanna Charaktis (Australia)
Ramina Tsoi (Kyrgyzstan)
Fourth official:
Mahsa Ghorbani (Iran)
Reserve assistant referee:
Kristina Sereda (Uzbekistan)
Video assistant referee:
Kate Jacewicz (Australia)
Assistant video assistant referee:
Casey Reibelt (Australia)

=== South Korea vs Philippines ===
3 February 2022
13:30

South Korea	2–0	Philippines
Cho So-hyun 4'; Son Hwa-yeon 34'	Report (FIFA); Report (AFC)

Shiv Chhatrapati Sports Complex, Pune
Attendance: 0
Referee: Pansa Chaisanit (Thailand)

South Korea

Team stats
South Korea	Statistic	Philippines
15	Shots	9
7	Shots on target	0
75%	Possession	25%
617	Passes	207
84%	Pass accuracy	61%
10	Fouls	7
1	Yellow cards	0
0	Red cards	0
2	Offsides	2
5	Corners	1

Philippines

GK	18	Kim Jung-mi
RB	20	Kim Hye-ri (c)
CB	6	Lim Seon-joo
CB	4	Shim Seo-yeon
LB	2	Choo Hyo-joo
DM	17	Lee Young-ju		(substituted off) 52'
CM	10	Ji So-yun	(yellow card) 46'	(substituted off) 58'
CM	8	Cho So-hyun
RW	11	Choe Yu-ri		(substituted off) 76'
LW	13	Lee Geum-min
CF	23	Son Hwa-yeon		(substituted off) 75'
Substitutions:
DF	16	Jang Sel-gi		(substituted on) 52'
MF	15	Park Ye-eun		(substituted on) 58'
FW	9	Yeo Min-ji		(substituted on) 75'
MF	7	Lee Min-a		(substituted on) 76'
Manager:
(England) Colin Bell

GK	23	Olivia McDaniel
RB	19	Eva Madarang	(substituted off) 46'
CB	5	Hali Long
CB	3	Dominique Randle
LB	16	Sofia Harrison
CM	9	Jessica Miclat	(substituted off) 86'
CM	10	Ryley Bugay
RW	6	Tahnai Annis (c)	(substituted off) 46'
LW	21	Katrina Guillou
CF	18	Sarina Bolden
CF	20	Quinley Quezada	(substituted off) 46'
Substitutions:
DF	2	Malea Cesar	(substituted on) 46'
FW	8	Chandler McDaniel	(substituted on) 46' (substituted off) 58'
MF	12	Sara Castañeda	(substituted on) 46'
MF	15	Carleigh Frilles	(substituted on) 58'
MF	11	Anicka Castañeda	(substituted on) 86'
Manager:
(Australia) Alen Stajcic

Assistant referees:
Trương Thị Lệ Trinh (Vietnam)
Supawan Hinthong (Thailand)
Fourth official:
Ranjita Devi Tekcham (India)
Reserve assistant referee:
Heba Saadieh (Palestine)
Video assistant referee:
Sivakorn Pu-Udom (Thailand)
Assistant video assistant referee:
Omar Al-Ali (United Arab Emirates)

== Final ==
6 February 2022
16:30

China	3–2	South Korea
Tang Jiali 68' (pen.); Zhang Linyan 72'; Xiao Yuyi 90+3'	Report (FIFA); Report (AFC)	Choe Yu-ri 27'; Ji So-yun 45+3' (pen.)

DY Patil Stadium, Navi Mumbai
Attendance: 0
Referee: Casey Reibelt (Australia)

China PR

Team stats
China PR	Statistics	South Korea
14	Shots	11
6	Shots on target	5
60%	Possession	40%
504	Passes	338
78%	Pass accuracy	64%
8	Fouls	13
3	Yellow cards	0
0	Red cards	0
1	Offsides	1
1	Corners	3

South Korea

GK	1	Zhu Yu
RB	14	Lou Jiahui		(substituted off) 46'
CB	3	Wang Xiaoxue
CB	11	Wang Shanshan (c)
LB	8	Yao Wei	(yellow card) 88'
RM	15	Wu Chengshu		(substituted off) 46'
CM	16	Yao Lingwei
CM	23	Gao Chen	(yellow card) 55'
LM	6	Zhang Xin	(yellow card) 89'
CF	7	Wang Shuang		(substituted off) 60'
CF	18	Tang Jiali		(substituted off) 90+6'
Substitutions:
MF	10	Zhang Rui		(substituted on) 46'
FW	20	Xiao Yuyi		(substituted on) 46'
FW	19	Zhang Linyan		(substituted on) 60'
MF	9	Wang Yanwen		(substituted on) 90+6'
Manager:
Shui Qingxia

GK	18	Kim Jung-mi
RB	20	Kim Hye-ri (c)
CB	6	Lim Seon-joo
CB	4	Shim Seo-yeon
LB	2	Choo Hyo-joo
DM	17	Lee Young-ju	(substituted off) 82'
CM	10	Ji So-yun
CM	8	Cho So-hyun
RW	11	Choe Yu-ri
LW	13	Lee Geum-min
CF	23	Son Hwa-yeon
Substitutions:
DF	16	Jang Sel-gi	(substituted on) 82'
Manager:
(England) Colin Bell

Assistant referees:
Joanna Charaktis (Australia)
Heba Saadieh (Palestine)
Fourth official:
Ranjita Devi Tekcham (India)
Reserve assistant referee:
Supawan Hinthong (Thailand)
Video assistant referee:
Kate Jacewicz (Australia)
Assistant video assistant referee:
Lara Lee (Australia)

== Play-offs ==
The format of the play-offs round depended on the performance of Australia, who qualified automatically for the World Cup as hosts. Since Australia was eliminated in the quarter-finals, the play-offs format was for the remaining three quarter-final losers to play a single round-robin play-off. The best team after three matches advanced to the World Cup, and the remaining two teams entered the inter-confederation play-offs.

Pos	Team	Pld	W	D	L	GF	GA	GD	Pts	Qualification
1	Vietnam	2	2	0	0	4	1	+3	6	Qualify for 2023 FIFA Women's World Cup
2	Chinese Taipei	2	1	0	1	4	2	+2	3	Advance to inter-confederation play-offs
3	Thailand	2	0	0	2	0	5	−5	0	Advance to inter-confederation play-offs

Source: AFC
Rules for classification: Group stage tiebreakers

=== Thailand vs Vietnam ===
2 February 2022
13:30

Thailand	0–2	Vietnam
	Report (FIFA); Report (AFC)	Huỳnh Như 19'; Thái Thị Thảo 24'

DY Patil Stadium, Navi Mumbai
Attendance: 0
Referee: Edita Mirabidova (Uzbekistan)

Thailand

Team stats
Thailand	Statistic	Vietnam
15	Shots	13
1	Shots on target	4
42%	Possession	58%
268	Passes	369
66%	Pass accuracy	76%
8	Fouls	7
1	Yellow cards	0
1	Red cards	0
2	Offsides	3
4	Corners	6

Vietnam

GK	1	Waraporn Boonsing
CB	9	Warunee Phetwiset	(yellow card) 90+6'
CB	2	Kanjanaporn Saenkhun	(red card) 90+3'
CB	10	Sunisa Srangthaisong		(substituted off) 90+4'
RM	5	Amornrat Utchai
CM	20	Wilaiporn Boothduang
CM	15	Orapin Waenngoen
LM	21	Chatchawan Rodthong
AM	7	Silawan Intamee (c)
AM	3	Irravadee Makris
CF	19	Pitsamai Sornsai
Substitutions:
DF	16	Uraiporn Yongkul		(substituted on) 90+4'
Assistant coach:
(Japan) Natsuko Todoroki

GK	14	Trần Thị Kim Thanh
RB	17	Trần Thị Phương Thảo
CB	3	Chương Thị Kiều
CB	4	Trần Thị Thu Thảo
LB	22	Nguyễn Thị Mỹ Anh	(substituted off) 40'
RM	23	Nguyễn Thị Bích Thùy	(substituted off) 65'
CM	11	Thái Thị Thảo	(substituted off) 55'
CM	8	Trần Thị Thùy Trang	(substituted off) 54'
LM	12	Phạm Hải Yến	(substituted off) 65'
AM	7	Nguyễn Thị Tuyết Dung
CF	9	Huỳnh Như (c)
Substitutions:
FW	21	Ngân Thị Vạn Sự	(substituted on) 40'
FW	19	Nguyễn Thị Thanh Nhã	(substituted on) 54'
MF	16	Dương Thị Vân	(substituted on) 55'
MF	6	Phạm Hoàng Quỳnh	(substituted on) 65'
FW	10	Nguyễn Thị Tuyết Ngân	(substituted on) 65'
Manager:
Mai Đức Chung

Assistant referees:
Fang Yan (China PR)
Merlo Albano (Philippines)
Fourth official:
Thein Thein Aye (Myanmar)
Reserve assistant referee:
Xie Lijun (China PR)
Video assistant referee:
Abdulla Al-Marri (Qatar)
Assistant video assistant referee:
Hanna Hattab (Syria)

=== Chinese Taipei vs Thailand ===
4 February 2022
13:30

Chinese Taipei	3–0	Thailand
Su Yu-hsuan 44', 84'; Chen Ying-hui 90+3'	Report (FIFA); Report (AFC)

DY Patil Stadium, Navi Mumbai
Attendance: 0
Referee: Kim Yu-jeong (South Korea)

Chinese Taipei

Team stats
Chinese Taipei	Statistic	Thailand
7	Shots	17
3	Shots on target	5
39%	Possession	61%
309	Passes	471
58%	Pass accuracy	75%
10	Fouls	9
1	Yellow cards	0
0	Red cards	0
2	Offsides	4
3	Corners	9

Thailand

GK	1	Tsai Ming-jung	(yellow card) 13'
CB	4	Lai Wei-ju
CB	15	Su Hsin-yun
CB	20	Chen Ying-hui
RWB	6	Zhuo Li-ping
LWB	5	Pan Shin-yu
RM	13	Pan Yen-hsin		(substituted off) 82'
CM	17	Ting Chi (c)		(substituted off) 90+2'
CM	14	Wu Kai-ching
LM	2	Chang Chi-lan		(substituted off) 56'
CF	19	Su Yu-hsuan
Substitutions:
DF	23	Chang Tzu-nuo		(substituted on) 56'
MF	22	Ting Chia-ying		(substituted on) 82'
FW	3	Lin Hsin-hui		(substituted on) 90+2'
Manager:
(Japan) Kazuo Echigo

GK	18	Chotmanee Thongmongkol
CB	9	Warunee Phetwiset
CB	16	Uraiporn Yongkul	(substituted off) 46'
CB	10	Sunisa Srangthaisong
RM	5	Amornrat Utchai
CM	20	Wilaiporn Boothduang
CM	15	Orapin Waenngoen
LM	21	Chatchawan Rodthong
AM	7	Silawan Intamee (c)	(substituted off) 86'
AM	3	Irravadee Makris
CF	19	Pitsamai Sornsai
Substitutions:
FW	17	Taneekarn Dangda	(substituted on) 46'
MF	12	Nutwadee Pram-nak	(substituted on) 86'
Assistant coach:
(Japan) Natsuko Todoroki

Assistant referees:
Kim Kyoung-min (South Korea)
Lee Seul-gi (South Korea)
Fourth official:
Oh Hyeon-jeong (South Korea)
Reserve assistant referee:
Makoto Bozono (Japan)
Video assistant referee:
Abdulla Al-Marri (Qatar)
Assistant video assistant referee:
Kim Hee-gon (South Korea)

=== Vietnam vs Chinese Taipei ===
6 February 2022
13:00

Vietnam	2–1	Chinese Taipei
Chương Thị Kiều 7'; Nguyễn Thị Bích Thùy 56'	Report (FIFA); Report (AFC)	Su Yu-hsuan 50'

DY Patil Stadium, Navi Mumbai
Attendance: 0
Referee: Yoshimi Yamashita (Japan)

Vietnam

Team stats
Vietnam	Statistic	Chinese Taipei
12	Shots	7
6	Shots on target	4
62%	Possession	38%
413	Passes	267
69%	Pass accuracy	63%
8	Fouls	10
2	Yellow cards	0
0	Red cards	0
0	Offsides	0
7	Corners	1

Chinese Taipei

GK	14	Trần Thị Kim Thanh
RB	17	Trần Thị Phương Thảo
CB	3	Chương Thị Kiều
CB	4	Trần Thị Thu Thảo
LB	22	Nguyễn Thị Mỹ Anh
RM	23	Nguyễn Thị Bích Thùy	(yellow card) 64'	(substituted off) 67'
CM	11	Thái Thị Thảo
CM	8	Trần Thị Thùy Trang		(substituted off) 66'
LM	12	Phạm Hải Yến		(substituted off) 73'
AM	7	Nguyễn Thị Tuyết Dung		(substituted off) 89'
CF	9	Huỳnh Như (c)		(substituted off) 90'
Substitutions:
MF	16	Dương Thị Vân		(substituted on) 66'
FW	19	Nguyễn Thị Thanh Nhã	(yellow card) 69'	(substituted on) 67'
FW	10	Nguyễn Thị Tuyết Ngân		(substituted on) 73'
FW	21	Ngân Thị Vạn Sự		(substituted on) 89'
DF	2	Lương Thị Thu Thương		(substituted on) 90'
Manager:
Mai Đức Chung

GK	1	Tsai Ming-jung
CB	4	Lai Wei-ju	(substituted off) 65'
CB	15	Su Hsin-yun
CB	23	Chang Tzu-nuo
RWB	6	Zhuo Li-ping
LWB	5	Pan Shin-yu
RM	13	Pan Yen-hsin
CM	17	Ting Chi (c)
CM	14	Wu Kai-ching
LM	7	Chen Yen-ping	(substituted off) 70'
CF	19	Su Yu-hsuan
Substitutions:
DF	20	Chen Ying-hui	(substituted on) 65'
FW	3	Lin Hsin-hui	(substituted on) 70'
Manager:
(Japan) Kazuo Echigo

Assistant referees:
Makoto Bozono (Japan)
Naomi Teshirogi (Japan)
Fourth official:
Thein Thein Aye (Myanmar)
Reserve assistant referee:
Kim Kyoung-min (South Korea)
Video assistant referee:
Omar Al-Ali (United Arab Emirates)
Assistant video assistant referee:
Ali Sabah (Iraq)
