= Football at the 2022 Asian Games – Women's team squads =

List of football squads for XIX Asian Games

The following is a list of squads for each nation competing in women's football at the 2022 Asian Games in Hangzhou, China. Each nation submitted a squad of 22 players.

== Group A ==
=== China ===
The following 22 players list was the China squad for the 2022 Asian Games.

Head Coach: Shui Qingxia

No.	Pos.	Player	Date of birth (age)	Caps	Goals	Club
1	GK	Zhu Yu	23 July 1997 (aged 26)	11	0	(Chinese Football Association) Shanghai Shengli
12	GK	Xu Huan	6 March 1999 (aged 24)	5	0	(Chinese Football Association) Jiangsu
22	GK	Pan Hongyan	30 December 2004 (aged 18)	0	0	(Chinese Football Association) Beijing
8	DF	Yao Wei	1 September 1997 (aged 26)	33	3	(Chinese Football Association) Wuhan Jianghan University
4	DF	Wang Linlin	4 August 2000 (aged 23)	10	1	(Chinese Football Association) Shanghai Shengli
3	DF	Dou Jiaxing	29 February 2000 (aged 23)	3	0	(Chinese Football Association) Jiangsu
15	DF	Chen Qiaozhu	8 September 1999 (aged 24)	6	0	(Chinese Football Association) Meizhou Huijun
2	DF	Li Mengwen	28 March 1995 (aged 28)	19	0	(The Football Association) Brighton & Hove Albion
2	DF	Liu Yanqiu	31 December 1995 (aged 27)			
10	MF	Zhang Rui (vice-captain)	17 January 1989 (aged 34)	163	24	(Chinese Football Association) Wuhan Jianghan University
16	MF	Yao Lingwei	5 December 1995 (aged 27)	17	0	(Chinese Football Association) Wuhan Jianghan University
6	MF	Zhang Xin	23 May 1992 (aged 31)	33	3	(Chinese Football Association) Shanghai Shengli
13	MF	Yang Lina	13 April 1994 (aged 29)	31	2	(Royal Spanish Football Federation) Levante Las Planas
9	MF	Shen Mengyu	19 August 2001 (aged 22)	1	0	(Scottish Football Association) Celtic
19	MF	Zhang Linyan	16 January 2001 (aged 22)	16	2	(The Football Association) Tottenham Hotspur
19	MF	Yan Jinjin	10 September 1996 (aged 27)			
7	FW	Wang Shuang	23 January 1995 (aged 28)	118	39	(United States Soccer Federation) Racing Louisville
14	FW	Lou Jiahui	26 May 1991 (aged 32)	113	5	(Chinese Football Association) Wuhan Jianghan University
21	FW	Gu Yasha	28 November 1990 (aged 32)	122	13	(Chinese Football Association) Wuhan Jianghan University
21	FW	Ou Yiyao	13 March 2001 (aged 22)			
11	FW	Wang Shanshan (captain)	27 January 1990 (aged 33)	154	58	(Chinese Football Association) Wuhan Jianghan University
21	FW	Wurigumula	26 August 1996 (aged 27)			

=== Uzbekistan ===
The following 22 players list was the Uzbekistan squad for the 2022 Asian Games.

Head Coach: (Japan) Midori Honda

=== Mongolia ===
The following 21 players list was the Mongolia squad for the 2022 Asian Games.

Head Coach: Erdenebat Sandagdorj

== Group B ==
=== Thailand ===
The following 23 players are called up for the squad for the 2022 AFC Women's Asian Cup.

Head Coach: Naruphol Kaensorn

No.	Pos.	Player	Date of birth (age)	Caps	Goals	Club
1	GK	Waraporn Boonsing	16 February 1990 (aged 31)	155	0	(Football Association of Thailand) BG Bundit Asia
18	GK	Chotmanee Thongmongkol	12 January 1999 (aged 23)	1	0	(Football Association of Thailand) Chonburi FC
22	GK	Tiffany Sornpao	22 May 1998 (aged 23)	4	0	(Football Association of Iceland) Selfoss
5	DF	Amornrat Utchai	4 September 1994 (aged 27)	1	0	(Football Association of Thailand) BG Bundit Asia
10	DF	Sunisa Srangthaisong	6 May 1988 (aged 33)	152	15	(Football Association of Thailand) BG Bundit Asia
16	DF	Uraiporn Yongkul	17 August 1998 (aged 23)	1	0	(Football Association of Thailand) BG Bundit Asia
21	DF	Chatchawan Rodthong	22 June 2002 (aged 19)	2	0	(Football Association of Thailand) Bangkok
2	MF	Kanjanaporn Saenkhun	July 18, 1996 (aged 25)	10	0	(Football Association of Thailand) College of Asian Scholars
8	MF	Nipawan Panyosuk	15 March 1995 (aged 26)	20	2	(Football Association of Thailand) Chonburi FC
6	MF	Pikul Khueanpet	20 September 1988 (aged 33)	115	2	(Football Association of Thailand) BG Bundit Asia
7	MF	Silawan Intamee (captain)	22 January 1994 (aged 27)	85	15	(Football Association of Thailand) Chonburi FC
9	MF	Warunee Phetwiset	13 December 1990 (aged 31)	100	0	(Football Association of Thailand) MH Nakhon Si Lady
12	MF	Nutwadee Pram-nak	9 October 2000 (aged 21)	12	2	(Japan Football Association) AC Nagano Parceiro Ladies
15	MF	Orapin Waenngoen	7 October 1995 (aged 26)	22	6	(Football Association of Thailand) BG Bundit Asia
11	FW	Jaruwan Chaiyarak	23 April 1990 (aged 31)	10	3	(Football Association of Thailand) Chonburi FC
13	FW	Kanyanat Chetthabutr	24 September 1999 (aged 22)	17	7	(Football Association of Thailand) BG Bundit Asia
14	FW	Saowalak Pengngam	30 November 1996 (aged 25)	20	10	(Football Association of Thailand) Chonburi FC
17	FW	Taneekarn Dangda	15 December 1992 (aged 29)	71	19	(Japan Football Association) AC Nagano Parceiro Ladies
19	FW	Pitsamai Sornsai	19 January 1989 (aged 33)	120	11	(Chinese Taipei Football Association) Taichung Blue Whale
20	MF	Wilaiporn Boothduang	25 June 1987 (aged 34)	98	28	(Football Association of Thailand) Royal Thai Air Force
23	FW	Suchawadee Nildhamrong	1 April 1997 (aged 24)	20	15	(United States Soccer Federation) Oakland Soul SC

=== India ===
On 27 August 2023, 22 players were named in the squad for the 2022 Asian Games.

Head Coach: (Sweden) Thomas Dennerby

No.	Pos.	Player	Date of birth (age)	Caps	Goals	Club
1	GK	Elangbam Panthoi Chanu	1 February 1996 (aged 27)	9	0	(All India Football Federation) Eastern Sporting Union
19	GK	Shreya Hooda	25 May 1999 (aged 24)	5	0	(All India Football Federation) Odisha
21	GK	Sowmiya Narayanasamy	25 July 2000 (aged 23)	2	0	(All India Football Federation) Gokulam Kerala
2	DF	Ngangbam Sweety Devi	1 December 1999 (aged 23)	52	1	(All India Football Federation) Odisha
4	DF	Loitongbam Ashalata Devi (Captain)	3 July 1993 (aged 30)	81	4	(All India Football Federation) Gokulam Kerala
	DF	Sanju Yadav	12 September 1997 (aged 26)	43	11	(All India Football Federation) Sethu
14	DF	Sorokhaibam Ranjana Chanu	10 March 1999 (aged 24)	28	3	(All India Football Federation) Gokulam Kerala
17	DF	Dalima Chhibber	30 August 1997 (aged 26)	46	2	(All India Football Federation) Kickstart
22	DF	Ritu Rani	25 May 1997 (aged 26)	11	0	(All India Football Federation) Mumbai Knights
	DF	Astam Oraon	5 February 2005 (aged 18)	1	0	(All India Football Federation) Kickstart
6	MF	Naorem Priyangka Devi	9 April 2003 (aged 20)	5	2	(All India Football Federation) Sethu
7	MF	Soumya Guguloth	18 January 2001 (aged 22)	17	4	(Croatian Football Federation) Dinamo Zagreb
8	MF	Sangita Basfore	12 July 1996 (aged 27)	45	3	(All India Football Federation) SSB Women
9	MF	Anju Tamang	22 December 1995 (aged 27)	48	12	(All India Football Federation) Odisha
12	MF	Indumathi Kathiresan (Vice Captain)	5 June 1994 (aged 29)	50	15	(All India Football Federation) Gokulam Kerala
	MF	Jyoti Chouhan	6 July 1999 (aged 24)	0	0	(Croatian Football Federation) Dinamo Zagreb
11	FW	Grace Dangmei	5 February 1996 (aged 27)	69	20	(All India Football Federation) Gokulam Kerala
13	FW	Sandhiya Ranganathan	20 May 1998 (age 28)	34	9	(All India Football Federation) Gokulam Kerala
	FW	Manisha Kalyan	27 November 2001 (aged 21)	29	5	(Cyprus Football Association) Apollon Limassol
15	FW	Renu	16 January 2001 (aged 22)	19	4	(All India Football Federation) HOPS FC
	FW	Pyari Xaxa	18 May 1997 (aged 26)	19	7	(All India Football Federation) Odisha
	FW	Bala Devi	2 February 1990 (age 36)	59	52	(All India Football Federation) Odisha

== Group C ==
=== North Korea ===
The following 22 players list was the North Korea squad for the 2022 Asian Games.

Head Coach: Ri Yu-Il

=== Singapore ===
The following 22 players list was the Singapore squad for the 2022 Asian Games. Umairah Hamdan withdraw from the final squad due to injury.

Head Coach: (Morocco) Karim Bencherifa

No.	Pos.	Player	Date of birth (age)	Caps	Goals	Club
1	GK	Noor Kusumawati	29 September 1990 (aged 32)	50	0	(Football Association of Singapore) Lion City Sailors
22	GK	Beatrice Tan	29 June 1992 (aged 31)	11	0	(Football Association of Singapore) Lion City Sailors
24	GK	Erlinawati Jafar	10 November 1985 (aged 37)	0	0	(Football Association of Singapore) Hougang United
5	DF	Nurerwadah Erwan	26 June 2004 (aged 19)	3	0	(Football Association of Singapore) Balestier Khalsa
10	DF	Irsalina Binte Irwan	1 January 2007 (aged 16)	5	0	(Football Association of Singapore) Albirex Niigata (S)
11	DF	Nur Adrianna Hazeri	3 July 2004 (aged 19)	0	0	(Football Association of Singapore) Tanjong Pagar United
14	DF	Khairunnisa Anwar	21 February 2003 (aged 20)	11	0	(Football Association of Singapore) Lion City Sailors
18	DF	Siti Rosnani	22 May 1997 (aged 26)	38	0	(Football Association of Singapore) Hougang United
20	DF	Nur Syazwani Ruzi	20 December 2001 (aged 21)	26	0	(Football Association of Singapore) Lion City Sailors
3	MF	Sarah Zu’risqha Zul’kepli	24 July 2006 (aged 17)	2	0	(Football Association of Singapore) Albirex Niigata (S)
4	MF	Stephanie Dominguez	27 September 1998 (aged 24)	35	4	(Football Association of Singapore) JSSL Tampines
6	MF	Nur Farhanah Rohaizat	26 July 1998 (aged 25)	36	0	(Football Association of Singapore) JSSL Tampines
9	MF	Afiqah Omar	15 October 2001 (aged 21)	8	0	(Football Association of Singapore) JSSL Tampines
13	MF	Ho Hui Xin	23 April 1992 (aged 31)	33	0	(Football Association of Singapore) Lion City Sailors
15	MF	Mastura Jeilani	10 July 1992 (aged 31)	15	0	(Football Association of Singapore) Balestier Khalsa
16	MF	Nasriah Ibrahim	1 September 2004 (aged 19)	0	0	(Football Association of Singapore) Balestier Khalsa
17	MF	Dhaniyah Qasimah	7 July 2004 (aged 19)	26	0	(Football Association of Singapore) Tanjong Pagar United
19	MF	Sitianiwati Rosielin	26 May 1997 (aged 26)	26		(Football Association of Singapore) Police SA
21	MF	Venetia Lim	14 October 2003 (aged 19)	18	0	(Football Association of Singapore) Lion City Sailors
7	FW	Raudhah Kamis	4 March 1999 (aged 24)	24	3	(Football Association of Singapore) Hougang United
8	FW	Farah Nurzahirah	13 January 2004 (aged 19)	1	1	(Football Association of Singapore) Tanjong Pagar United
23	FW	Nicole Lim	10 April 2002 (aged 21)	8	1	(Scottish Football Association) University of Edinburgh

== Group D ==
=== Japan ===
The following players were called up for the 2022 Asian Games.

Head Coach: Michihisa Kano (狩野 倫久)

No.	Pos.	Player	Date of birth (age)	Caps	Goals	Club
1	GK	Natsumi Asano (浅野 菜摘)	14 April 1997 (age 29)	0	0	(Japan Football Association) Chifure AS Elfen Saitama
12	GK	Shu Ohba (大場 朱羽)	11 July 2002 (age 24)	0	0	(United States Soccer Federation) Ole Miss Rebels
18	GK	Mamiko Matsumoto (松本 真未子)	9 October 1997 (age 29)	0	0	(Japan Football Association) MyNavi Sendai
2	DF	Shinomi Koyama (小山 史乃観)	31 January 2005 (age 21)	1	0	(Japan Football Association) Cerezo Osaka Yanmar
3	DF	Haruna Tabata (田畑 晴菜)	27 May 2002 (age 24)	0	0	(Japan Football Association) MyNavi Sendai
4	DF	Wakaba Goto (後藤 若葉)	4 June 2001 (age 25)	0	0	(Japan Football Association) Waseda University
6	DF	Rio Sasaki (佐々木 里緒)	17 September 2004 (age 22)	0	0	(Japan Football Association) MyNavi Sendai
17	DF	Toko Koga (古賀 塔子)	6 January 2006 (age 20)	0	0	(Japan Football Association) JFA Academy Fukushima
5	MF	Reina Wakisaka (脇阪 麗奈)	2 May 1999 (age 27)	0	0	(Japan Football Association) Cerezo Osaka Yanmar
8	MF	Chihiro Ishida (石田 千尋)	20 December 2001 (age 24)	0	0	(Japan Football Association) Albirex Niigata
10	MF	Yuzuho Shiokoshi (塩越 柚歩) (captain)	1 November 1997 (age 28)	5	2	(Japan Football Association) Urawa Red Diamonds
11	MF	Yoshino Nakashima (中嶋 淑乃)	27 July 1999 (age 27)	1	0	(Japan Football Association) Sanfrecce Hiroshima Regina
14	MF	Momoko Tanikawa (谷川 萌々子)	7 May 2005 (age 21)	0	0	(Japan Football Association) JFA Academy Fukushima
16	MF	Suzu Amano (天野 紗)	18 February 2004 (age 22)	0	0	(Japan Football Association) INAC Kobe Leonessa
21	MF	Kotono Sakakibara (榊原 琴乃)	11 October 2004 (age 22)	0	0	(Japan Football Association) Nojima Stella Sagamihara
7	FW	Yuzuki Yamamoto (山本 柚月)	1 September 2002 (age 24)	0	0	(Japan Football Association) Tokyo Verdy Beleza
9	FW	Mami Ueno (上野 真実)	27 September 1996 (age 30)	10	1	(Japan Football Association) Sanfrecce Hiroshima Regina
13	FW	Mei Shimada (島田 芽依)	8 May 2002 (age 24)	0	0	(Japan Football Association) Urawa Red Diamonds
15	FW	Remina Chiba (千葉 玲海菜)	30 April 1999 (age 27)	5	2	(Japan Football Association) JEF United Chiba
19	FW	Maya Hijikata (土方 麻耶)	13 April 2004 (age 22)	0	0	(Japan Football Association) Tokyo Verdy Beleza
20	FW	Haruka Osawa (大澤 春花)	15 April 2001 (age 25)	0	0	(Japan Football Association) JEF United Chiba

=== Vietnam ===
Head coach: Mai Đức Chung

No.	Pos.	Player	Date of birth (age)	Caps	Goals	Club
1	GK	Đào Thị Kiều Oanh	25 January 2003 (age 23)	0	0	(Vietnam Football Federation) Hanoi
14	GK	Trần Thị Kim Thanh	18 September 1993 (age 33)	52	0	(Vietnam Football Federation) Ho Chi Minh City
20	GK	Khổng Thị Hằng	10 October 1993 (age 33)	30	0	(Vietnam Football Federation) Than KSVN
2	DF	Lương Thị Thu Thương	1 May 2000 (age 26)	27	0	(Vietnam Football Federation) Than KSVN
3	DF	Trần Thị Duyên	28 December 2000 (age 25)	3	0	(Vietnam Football Federation) Phong Phu Ha Nam
4	DF	Trần Thị Thu	15 January 1991 (age 35)	36	2	(Vietnam Football Federation) Ho Chi Minh City
5	DF	Hoàng Thị Loan	6 February 1995 (age 31)	45	2	(Vietnam Football Federation) Hanoi
6	DF	Nguyễn Thị Hoa	28 November 2000 (age 25)	0	0	(Vietnam Football Federation) Hanoi
10	DF	Trần Thị Hải Linh	8 June 2001 (age 25)	21	0	(Vietnam Football Federation) Hanoi
13	DF	Lê Thị Diễm My	6 March 1994 (age 32)	18	0	(Vietnam Football Federation) Than KSVN
17	DF	Trần Thị Thu Thảo	15 January 1993 (age 33)	48	3	(Vietnam Football Federation) Ho Chi Minh City
22	DF	Phạm Thị Lan Anh	4 January 2001 (age 25)	0	0	(Vietnam Football Federation) Hanoi
7	MF	Nguyễn Thị Tuyết Dung	13 December 1993 (age 32)	122	51	(Vietnam Football Federation) Phong Phu Ha Nam
8	MF	Nguyễn Thị Trúc Hương	4 March 2000 (age 26)	4	0	(Vietnam Football Federation) Than KSVN
11	MF	Thái Thị Thảo	12 February 1995 (age 31)	49	12	(Vietnam Football Federation) Hanoi
15	MF	Nguyễn Thị Bích Thùy	1 May 1994 (age 32)	68	14	(Vietnam Football Federation) Ho Chi Minh City
16	MF	Dương Thị Vân	20 September 1994 (age 32)	46	2	(Vietnam Football Federation) Than KSVN
19	MF	Nguyễn Thị Thanh Nhã	25 September 2001 (age 25)	31	7	(Vietnam Football Federation) Hanoi
21	MF	Ngân Thị Vạn Sự	29 April 2001 (age 25)	30	6	(Vietnam Football Federation) Hanoi
9	FW	Nguyễn Thị Thúy Hằng	4 March 2000 (age 26)	17	5	(Vietnam Football Federation) Than KSVN
12	FW	Phạm Hải Yến	9 November 1994 (age 31)	80	43	(Vietnam Football Federation) Hanoi
18	FW	Nguyễn Thị Tuyết Ngân	10 February 2000 (age 26)	7	1	(Vietnam Football Federation) Ho Chi Minh City

=== Bangladesh ===
The following 22 players list was the Bangladesh squad for the 2022 Asian Games.

Head Coach: Mahabubur Rahman Litu

No.	Pos.	Player	Date of birth (age)	Caps	Goals	Club
	GK	Rupna Chakma	2 January 2004 (aged 19)			(Bangladesh Football Federation)
	GK	Sathi Bishwas				(Bangladesh Football Federation)
	GK	Swarna Rani Mandol				(Bangladesh Football Federation)
	DF	Nilufa Yeasmin Nila				(Bangladesh Football Federation)
	DF	Sheuli Azim	20 December 2001 (aged 21)			(Bangladesh Football Federation)
	DF	Anai Mogini	1 March 2003 (aged 20)			(Bangladesh Football Federation)
	DF	Shamsunnahar Sr.	31 January 2003 (aged 20)			(Bangladesh Football Federation)
	DF	Masura Parvin	17 October 1998 (aged 24)			(Bangladesh Football Federation)
	DF	Afeida Khandokar				(Bangladesh Football Federation)
	DF	Surma Jannat				(Bangladesh Football Federation)
	MF	Ritu Porna Chakma	30 December 2003 (aged 19)			(Bangladesh Football Federation)
	MF	Shamsunnahar Jr.	30 March 2004 (aged 19)			(Bangladesh Football Federation)
	MF	Swapna Rani				(Bangladesh Football Federation)
	MF	Monika Chakma	15 September 2003 (aged 20)			(Bangladesh Football Federation)
	MF	Maria Manda	10 May 2003 (aged 20)			(Bangladesh Football Federation)
	FW	Sabina Khatun (captain)	25 October 1993 (aged 29)			(Bangladesh Football Federation)
	FW	Sanjida Akter	20 March 2001 (aged 22)			(Bangladesh Football Federation)
	FW	Krishna Rani Sarkar	1 January 2001 (aged 22)			(Bangladesh Football Federation)
	FW	Tahura Khatun	5 May 2003 (aged 20)			(Bangladesh Football Federation)
	FW	Shahida Akter Ripa				(Bangladesh Football Federation)
	FW	Sumaya Matsushima	21 January 2001 (aged 22)			(Bangladesh Football Federation)
	FW	Marzia	15 October 2002 (aged 20)			(Bangladesh Football Federation)

== Group E ==
=== South Korea ===
The following 22 players were called up for the 2022 Asian Games.

Head Coach: (England) Colin Bell

No.	Pos.	Player	Date of birth (age)	Caps	Goals	Club
1	GK	Choi Ye-seul (최예슬)	12 March 1997 (aged 26)	1	0	(Korea Football Association) Changnyeong WFC
18	GK	Kim Jung-mi (김정미)	16 October 1984 (aged 38)	138	0	(Korea Football Association) Incheon Hyundai SRA
21	GK	Ryu Ji-soo (류지수)	3 September 1997 (aged 26)	0	0	(Korea Football Association) Seoul WFC
2	DF	Choo Hyo-joo (추효주)	29 July 2000 (aged 23)	34	3	(Korea Football Association) Suwon UDC
3	DF	Kim Hye-yeong (김혜영)	26 February 1995 (aged 28)	10	1	(Korea Football Association) Gyeongju KHNP WFC
4	DF	Shim Seo-yeon (심서연)	15 April 1989 (aged 34)	80	0	(Korea Football Association) Suwon UDC
6	DF	Lim Seon-joo (임선주)	27 November 1990 (aged 32)	105	6	(Korea Football Association) Incheon Hyundai SRA
16	DF	Jang Sel-gi (장슬기)	31 May 1994 (aged 29)	93	13	(Korea Football Association) Incheon Hyundai SRA
20	DF	Kim Hye-ri (김혜리) (captain)	25 June 1990 (aged 33)	115	1	(Korea Football Association) Incheon Hyundai SRA
5	MF	Kwon Hah-nul (권하늘)	7 March 1988 (aged 35)	105	15	(Korea Football Association) Mungyeong Sangmu
8	MF	Lee Min-a (이민아)	8 November 1991 (aged 31)	76	17	(Korea Football Association) Incheon Hyundai SRA
10	MF	Ji So-yun (지소연)	21 February 1991 (aged 32)	148	67	(Korea Football Association) Suwon UDC
14	MF	Jeon Eun-ha (전은하)	28 January 1993 (aged 30)	14	0	(Korea Football Association) Suwon UDC
15	MF	Chun Ga-ram (천가람)	19 October 2002 (aged 20)	6	0	(Korea Football Association) Hwacheon KSPO
22	MF	Bae Ye-bin (배예빈)	7 December 2004 (aged 18)	2	0	(Korea Football Association) Uiduk University
7	FW	Son Hwa-yeon (손화연)	15 March 1997 (aged 26)	51	8	(Korea Football Association) Incheon Hyundai SRA
9	FW	Mun Eun-ju (문은주)	1 September 2000 (aged 23)	5	1	(Korea Football Association) Hwacheon KSPO
11	FW	Choe Yu-ri (최유리)	16 September 1994 (aged 29)	54	9	(The Football Association) Birmingham City
12	FW	Moon Mi-ra (문미라)	28 February 1992 (aged 31)	32	16	(Korea Football Association) Suwon UDC
13	FW	Park Eun-sun (박은선)	25 December 1986 (aged 36)	45	20	(Korea Football Association) Seoul WFC
17	FW	Jung Seol-bin (정설빈)	6 January 1990 (aged 33)	82	22	(Korea Football Association) Incheon Hyundai SRA
19	FW	Lee Eun-young (이은영)	31 March 2002 (aged 21)	2	0	(Korea Football Association) Korea University-Sejong

=== Hong Kong ===
The following players were called up for the 2022 Asian Games

Head Coach: (Brazil) José Ricardo Rambo

No.	Pos.	Player	Date of birth (age)	Caps	Goals	Club
	GK	Ng Cheuk Wai	19 March 1997 (aged 26)			(Chinese Taipei Football Association) Taoyuan Mars FC
	GK	Ng Yuen Ki	20 December 1997 (aged 25)			(Football Association of Hong Kong, China) Happy Valley
	GK	Leung Wai Nga	24 August 1988 (aged 35)			(Football Association of Hong Kong, China) Happy Valley
	DF	Wong Hei Tung	8 January 2001 (aged 22)			
	DF	Wu Choi Yiu	19 October 1997 (aged 25)			(Football Association of Hong Kong, China) Chelsea SS HK
	DF	Ma Chak Shun	2 March 1996 (aged 27)			(Football Association of Hong Kong, China) Chelsea SS HK
	DF	Sin Chung Yee	28 November 1995 (aged 27)			(Football Association of Hong Kong, China) Shatin SA
	DF	Chu So Kwan	3 March 2004 (aged 19)			
	DF	Chung Pui-ki	30 March 1996 (aged 27)			(Football Association of Hong Kong, China) Kitchee
	DF	Kwok Oi Laam	26 August 2001 (aged 22)			(Football Association of Hong Kong, China) Grace Citizen
	MF	Tsang Pak Tung	27 December 1986 (aged 36)			(Football Association of Hong Kong, China) Tai Po FC
	MF	Wong So Han	26 November 1991 (aged 31)			(Football Association of Hong Kong, China) Shatin SA
	MF	Leung Hong Kiu	28 November 2000 (aged 22)			(Football Association of Hong Kong, China) Chelsea SS HK
	MF	So Hoi Lam	29 June 1995 (aged 28)			(Football Association of Hong Kong, China) Kitchee
	MF	Tsang Lai Mae	28 June 1999 (aged 24)			(Football Association of Hong Kong, China) Chelsea SS HK
	MF	Chan Yee Hing	28 April 1997 (aged 26)			(Football Association of Hong Kong, China) Chelsea SS HK
	MF	Ho Mui Mei	15 March 1993 (aged 30)			
	MF	Cham Ching Man	31 December 1999 (aged 23)			(Football Association of Hong Kong, China) Kitchee
	MF	Chan Wing Lam	25 May 1999 (aged 24)			(Football Association of Hong Kong, China) Chelsea SS HK
	MF	Chan Wing Sze	11 September 1983 (aged 40)			
	FW	Lau Yun Yi	4 June 1997 (aged 26)			(Football Association of Hong Kong, China) Tai Po FC
	MF	Cheung Wai Ki	13 January 1997 (aged 26)			(Football Association of Hong Kong, China) Kitchee

=== Philippines ===
The following 21 players are included in the squad for the 2022 Asian Games.

Head Coach: (Australia) Mark Torcaso

No.	Pos.	Player	Date of birth (age)	Caps	Goals	Club
1	GK	Olivia McDaniel	14 October 1997 (aged 25)	31	0	(Austrian Football Association) Pinzgau Saalfelden
18	GK	Inna Palacios	8 February 1994 (aged 29)	52	0	(Philippine Football Federation) Kaya–Iloilo
22	GK	Kiara Fontanilla	1 July 2000 (aged 23)	9	0	(Football Australia) Central Coast Mariners
3	DF	Jessika Cowart	30 October 1999 (aged 23)	21	2	(Football Australia) Perth Glory
5	DF	Hali Long (captain)	21 January 1995 (aged 28)	76	18	(Philippine Football Federation) Kaya–Iloilo
9	DF	Reina Bonta	17 April 1999 (aged 24)	11	0	(Brazilian Football Confederation) Santos
16	DF	Sofia Harrison	16 February 1999 (aged 24)	37	3	Unattached
19	DF	Eva Madarang	13 September 1997 (aged 26)	54	12	(Football Australia) Blacktown Spartans
2	MF	Natalie Oca	28 October 2003 (aged 19)	0	0	(United States Soccer Federation) Loyola Marymount Lions
4	MF	Jaclyn Sawicki	14 November 1992 (aged 30)	23	0	(Football Australia) Western United
6	MF	Isabella Pasion	28 November 2006 (aged 16)	5	0	(United States Soccer Federation) Lebanon Trail High School
8	MF	Sara Eggesvik	29 April 1997 (aged 26)	24	3	(Norwegian Football Federation) KIL/Hemne
11	MF	Anicka Castañeda	16 December 1999 (aged 23)	38	11	(Football Australia) Mt Druitt Town Rangers
12	MF	Kaya Hawkinson	17 April 2000 (aged 23)	15	1	(Football Australia) Central Coast Mariners
15	MF	Camille Rodriguez	27 December 1994 (aged 28)	42	11	(Philippine Football Federation) Kaya–Iloilo
20	MF	Quinley Quezada	7 April 1997 (aged 26)	51	22	(Football Australia) Perth Glory
7	FW	Sarina Bolden	30 June 1996 (aged 27)	39	22	(Football Australia) Western Sydney Wanderers
10	FW	Chandler McDaniel	4 February 1998 (aged 25)	15	5	(Austrian Football Association) Pinzgau Saalfelden
14	FW	Meryll Serrano	20 July 1997 (aged 26)	10	4	(Norwegian Football Federation) Stabæk
17	FW	Alisha del Campo	20 September 1999 (aged 24)	25	11	(Philippine Football Federation) DLSU Lady Booters
21	FW	Katrina Guillou	19 December 1993 (aged 29)	27	10	(Swedish Football Association) Piteå

=== Myanmar ===
The following 22 players list was the Myanmar squad for the 2022 Asian Games.

Head Coach: (Japan) Uki Tetsuro

No.	Pos.	Player	Date of birth (age)	Caps	Goals	Club
1	GK	May Zin Nwe	7 March 1995 (aged 28)	12	0	(Myanmar Football Federation) Myawady W.F.C.
18	GK	Myo Mya Mya Nyein	28 November 1999 (aged 23)	9	0	(Myanmar Football Federation) Thitsar Arman W.F.C.
25	GK	Htet Eaindra Lin	5 June 2002 (aged 21)	0	0	(Myanmar Football Federation) ISPE W.F.C.
2	DF	May Thet Mon Myint	28 November 2004 (aged 18)	8	0	(Myanmar Football Federation) Thitsar Arman W.F.C.
3	DF	Moe Ma Ma Soe	28 November 1999 (aged 23)	16	1	(Myanmar Football Federation) ISPE W.F.C.
4	DF	Zune Yu Ya Oo	12 February 2001 (aged 22)	13	0	(Myanmar Football Federation) Myawady W.F.C.
5	DF	Phyu Phyu Win	12 January 2004 (aged 19)	11	0	(Myanmar Football Federation) Myawady W.F.C.
12	DF	Khaing Thazin	18 July 1996 (aged 27)	21	0	(Myanmar Football Federation) Myawady W.F.C.
14	DF	Ei Ei Kyaw	1 April 2002 (aged 21)	1	0	(Myanmar Football Federation) ISPE W.F.C.
17	DF	Phyu Phwe	9 May 2005 (aged 18)	0	0	(Myanmar Football Federation) Yangon United W.F.C.
24	DF	Nge Nge Htwe	9 March 1998 (aged 25)	0	0	(Myanmar Football Federation) Thitsar Arman W.F.C.
6	MF	Naw Htet Htet Wai	30 July 2000 (aged 23)	19	0	(Myanmar Football Federation) Myawady W.F.C.
10	MF	Khin Mo Mo Tun	3 July 1999 (aged 24)	29	1	(Myanmar Football Federation) Thitsar Arman W.F.C.
11	MF	Yoon Wadi Hlaing	9 September 2005 (aged 18)	1	0	(Myanmar Football Federation) Yangon United W.F.C.
13	MF	Win Win	12 February 2003 (aged 20)	0	0	(Myanmar Football Federation) Thitsar Arman W.F.C.
16	MF	Pont Pont Pyae Maung	24 May 2003 (aged 20)	38	13	(Myanmar Football Federation) Myawady W.F.C.
21	MF	Wai Phoo Eain	17 January 2004 (aged 19)	0	0	(Myanmar Football Federation) Thitsar Arman W.F.C.
7	FW	Win Theingi Tun	1 February 1995 (aged 28)	73	70	(Football Association of Thailand) College of Asian Scholars
8	FW	San Thaw Thaw	2 January 2001 (aged 22)	32	12	(Myanmar Football Federation) Myawady W.F.C.
9	FW	Yin Loon Eain	21 March 2006 (aged 17)	2	0	(Myanmar Football Federation) ISPE W.F.C.
19	MF	Myat Noe Khin	24 July 2003 (aged 20)	14	6	(Myanmar Football Federation) Thitsar Arman W.F.C.
20	FW	July Kyaw	21 July 1999 (aged 23)	37	12	(Myanmar Football Federation) Thitsar Arman W.F.C.

== See also ==
- Football at the 2022 Asian Games – Men's tournament
