= China women's national football team results (2020–present) =

- This article lists the results for the China women's national football team since 2020.

Win Draw Lose Fixtures

== 2020 ==
7 February 2020 2020 AFC Women's Olympic Qualifying - Third round	China	6–1	Thailand	Campbelltown Stadium, Sydney
16:30 UTC+11	Li Ying 6', 66'; Zhang Xin 11'; Wang Shanshan 41'; Tang Jiali 45', 51'	Live Report; Stats Report	Silawan 80'	Referee: Abirami Naidu (Singapore)

10 February 2020 2020 AFC Women's Olympic Qualifying - Third round	Chinese Taipei	0–5	China	Campbelltown Stadium, Sydney
16:30 UTC+11		Live Report; Stats Report	Tang Jiali 5'; Wu Haiyan 25'; Wang Shanshan 26', 30'; Li Ying 34'	Referee: Mahsa Ghorbani (Iran)

13 February 2020 2020 AFC Women's Olympic Qualifying - Third round	Australia	1–1	China	Bankwest Stadium, Sydney
19:30 UTC+11	Van Egmond 90+2'	Live Report; Stats Report	Tang Jiali 86'

== 2021 ==
8 April 2021 2020 AFC Women's Olympic Qualifying - Play-off round (1st leg)	South Korea	1–2	China	Goyang, South Korea
16:00 UTC+9	Kang Chae-rim 39'	Live Report (AFC); Stats Report (AFC); Report (KFA); Report (Soccerway)	Zhang Xin 33'; Wang Shuang 73' (pen.)	Stadium: Goyang Stadium; Attendance: 1,091; Referee: Casey Reibelt (Australia)

13 April 2021 2020 AFC Women's Olympic Qualifying - Play-off round (2nd leg)	China	2–2 (a.e.t.)	South Korea	Suzhou, China
16:00 UTC+8	Wang Shuang 69', 104'	Live Report (AFC); Stats Report (AFC); Report (Soccerway)	Kang Chae-rim 31'; Choe Yu-ri 45'	Stadium: Suzhou Olympic Sports Centre; Referee: Yoshimi Yamashita (Japan)

21 July 2021 Olympics GS	China	0–5	Brazil	Rifu, Japan
17:00 UTC+9		Report (Tokyo 2020); Report (FIFA)	Marta 9', 74'; Debinha 22'; Alves 82' (pen.); Beatriz 89'	Stadium: Miyagi Stadium; Attendance: 0 Referee: Kateryna Monzul (Ukraine)

24 July 2021 Olympics GS	China	4–4	Zambia	Rifu, Japan
17:00 UTC+9	Wang Shuang 6', 22', 23', 83' (pen.)	Report (Tokyo 2020); Report (FIFA)	Kundananji 15'; Banda 42' (pen.), 46', 69'	Stadium: Miyagi Stadium; Attendance: 0 Referee: Melissa Borjas (Honduras)

27 July 2021 Olympics GS	Netherlands	8–2	China	Yokohama, Japan
20:30 UTC+9	van de Sanden 12'; Beerensteyn 37', 45+2'; Martens 47', 70'; Miedema 65', 76'; Pelova 72'	Report (Tokyo 2020); Report (FIFA)	Wang Shanshan 28'; Wang Yanwen 69'	Stadium: International Stadium Yokohama; Attendance: 0 Referee: Salima Mukansanga (Rwanda)

== 2022 ==
20 January 2022 AFC Women's Asian Cup	China	4–0	Chinese Taipei	Mumbai, India
15:30 UTC+5:30	Wang Shuang 3' (pen.), 68'; Wang Shanshan 9'; Zhang Xin 54'	Report (FIFA); Report (AFC)		Stadium: Mumbai Football Arena; Attendance: 0 Referee: Abirami Naidu (Singapore)

23 January 2022 AFC Women's Asian Cup	Iran	0–7	China	Mumbai, India
15:30 UTC+5:30		Report	Wang Shuang 28', 49' (pen.); Xiao Yuyi 43'; Wang Shanshan 55', 59'; Tang Jiali 77'; Adeli 82' (o.g.)	Stadium: Mumbai Football Arena; Referee: Pansa Chaisanit (Thailand)

26 January 2022 AFC Women's Asian Cup	India	Cancelled	China	Mumbai, India
19:30 UTC+5:30		Report		Stadium: Mumbai Football Arena

30 January 2022 AFC Women's Asian Cup QF	China	3–1	Vietnam	Navi Mumbai, India
17:30 UTC+5:30	Wang Shuang 25'; Wang Shanshan 52'; Tang Jiali 53'	Report	Nguyễn Thị Tuyết Dung 11'	Stadium: DY Patil Stadium; Referee: Oh Hyeon-jeong (South Korea)

3 February 2022 AFC Women's Asian Cup SF	China	2–2 (a.e.t.) (4–3 p)	Japan	Pune, India
19:30 UTC+5:30	Wu Chengshu 46'; Wang Shanshan 119'	Report	Ueki 26', 103'	Stadium: Shiv Chhatrapati Sports Complex; Referee: Lara Lee (Australia)
	Penalties
	Zhang Xin (penalty missed); Zhang Rui (penalty scored); Yang Lina (penalty scored); Gao Chen (penalty scored); Wang Shanshan (penalty scored)		(penalty missed) Kumagai; (penalty scored) Hasegawa; (penalty scored) Shimizu; (penalty scored) Nagano; (penalty missed) Minami

6 February 2022 AFC Women's Asian Cup F	China	3–2	South Korea	Navi Mumbai, India
	Tang Jiali 68' (pen.); Zhang Linyan 72'; Xiao Yuyi 90+3'	Report	Choe Yu-ri 27'; Ji So-yun 45+3' (pen.)	Stadium: DY Patil Stadium

20 July 2022 EAFF E-1 Football Championship	China	2–0	Chinese Taipei	Toyota, Japan
15:30 UTC+9	Zhang Linyan 12'; Su Sin-Yun 22' (o.g.)	Report (EAFF); Report (EAFF)		Stadium: Toyota Stadium; Attendance: 100; Referee: Edita Mirabidova (Uzbekistan)

23 July 2022 EAFF E-1 Football Championship	China	1–1	South Korea	Kashima, Japan
19:00 UTC+9	Wang Linlin 76'	Report (EAFF); Report (EAFF)	Choe Yu-ri 34'	Stadium: Kashima Soccer Stadium; Attendance: 352; Referee: Kate Jacewicz (Australia)

26 July 2022 EAFF E-1 Football Championship	Japan	0–0	China	Kashima, Japan
19:20 UTC+9		Report (EAFF); Report (EAFF)		Stadium: Kashima Soccer Stadium; Attendance: 901; Referee: Pansa Chaisanit (Thailand)

== 2023 ==
16 February Friendly	Sweden	4–1	China	Marbella, Spain
18:30 UTC+1	Rytting Kaneryd 1'; Janogy 3', 14'; Björn 65'		Xiao Yuyi 50'	Stadium: Marbella Football Center; Referee: Olatz Rivera Olmedo (Spain)

22 February Friendly	Republic of Ireland	0–0	China	Algeciras, Spain
14:00 UTC+1				Stadium: Estadio Nuevo Mirador; Referee: Jason Barcelo (Gibraltar)

6 April Friendly	Switzerland	0–0	China	Lucerne, Switzerland
17:30 UTC+2		Report		Stadium: Swissporarena; Referee: Katalin Kulcsár (Hungary)

11 April Friendly	Spain	3–0	China	Ibiza, Spain
--:-- UTC+2				Stadium: Estadi Municipal de Can Misses

1 July Unofficial friendly	China	1–0	Russia	Qingdao, China
16:00 UTC+8				Stadium: Conson Stadium; Attendance: 0

4 July Unofficial friendly	China	2–1	Russia	Qingdao, China
16:00 UTC+8				Stadium: Conson Stadium; Attendance: 0

13 July Unofficial friendly	China	0–3	Brazil	Gold Coast, Australia
12:00 UTC+10				Attendance: 0

17 July Unofficial friendly	China	2–2	Colombia	Sydney, Australia
--:-- UTC+10		Report		Attendance: 0

22 July FIFA Women's World Cup	Denmark	1–0	China	Perth, Australia
20:00 UTC+8	Vangsgaard 90'	Report (FIFA)		Stadium: Perth Rectangular Stadium; Attendance: 16,989; Referee: Marie-Soleil Beaudoin (Canada)

28 July FIFA Women's World Cup	China	1–0	Haiti	Adelaide, Australia
20:30 UTC+9:30	Wang Shuang 74' (pen.)	Report (FIFA)		Stadium: Hindmarsh Stadium; Attendance: 12,675; Referee: Marta Huerta de Aza (Spain)

1 August FIFA Women's World Cup	China	1–6	England	Adelaide, Australia
20:30 UTC+9:30	Wang Shuang 57' (pen.)	Report (FIFA)	Russo 4'; Hemp 26'; James 41', 65'; Kelly 77'; Daly 84'	Stadium: Hindmarsh Stadium; Attendance: 13,497; Referee: Casey Reibelt (Australia)

22 September Asian Games	China	16–0	Mongolia	Hangzhou, China
19:30 UTC+8				Stadium: Linping Sports Center Stadium

28 September Asian Games	China	6–0	Uzbekistan	Hangzhou, China
19:30 UTC+8				Stadium: Linping Sports Center Stadium

30 September Asian Games QF	China	4–0	Thailand	Hangzhou, China
20:00 UTC+8				Stadium: Linping Sports Center Stadium

3 October Asian Games SF	China	3–4	Japan	Hangzhou, China
20:00 UTC+8				Stadium: Linping Sports Center Stadium

6 October Asian Games 3rd	China	7–0	Uzbekistan	Hangzhou, China
15:00 UTC+8				Stadium: Yellow Dragon Sports Center

26 October Olympic Qualifying Tournament second round	China	1–2	North Korea	Xiamen, China
19:35 UTC+8				Stadium: Xiamen Egret Stadium

29 October Olympic Qualifying Tournament second round	Thailand	0–3	China	Xiamen, China
19:35 UTC+8				Stadium: Xiamen Egret Stadium

1 November Olympic Qualifying Tournament second round	China	1–1	South Korea	Xiamen, China
19:35 UTC+8				Stadium: Xiamen Egret Stadium

2 December Friendly	United States	3–0	China	Fort Lauderdale, United States
15:00 UTC−5	Smith 8'; Horan 52'; Rodman 77'	Report		Stadium: DRV PNK Stadium; Attendance: 8,768; Referee: Marie-Soleil Beaudoin (Canada)

5 December Friendly	United States	2–1	China	Frisco, United States
20:00 UTC−6	Coffey 62'; Shaw 79'		Shen 45+1'	Stadium: Toyota Stadium

== 2024 ==
31 May Friendly	Australia	1–1	China	Adelaide, Australia
19:40 UTC+09:30	Heyman 90+5'	Report	Zhang 30'	Stadium: Adelaide Oval; Attendance: 52,912; Referee: Kim Yu-jeong (South Korea)

3 June Friendly	Australia	2–0	China	Sydney, Australia
19:30 UTC+10:00	Wheeler 48'; Raso 56'	Report		Stadium: Accor Stadium; Attendance: 76,798; Referee: Oh Hyun-jung (South Korea)

26 October Yongchuan International Tournament	China	3–0	Uzbekistan	Chongqing, China
20:00 UTC+8				Stadium: Yongchuan Sports Center

29 October Yongchuan International Tournament	China	2–0	Vietnam	Chongqing, China
19:35 UTC+8	Zhang Xin 41'; Trần Thị Thu Thảo 90+3' (o.g.)			Stadium: Yongchuan Sports Center

29 November Friendly	Netherlands	4–1	China	Rotterdam
20:45 UTC+1	Kaptein 66'; Roord 72'; Beerensteyn 81'; Brugts 84'		Kun 34'	Stadium: Sparta Stadion Het Kasteel; Attendance: 7,011

== 2025 ==
19 February Pinatar Cup	Canada	1–1	China	San Pedro del Pinatar, Spain
19:00 UTC+1	Grosso 16'		Jin Kun 58'	Stadium: Pinatar Arena

22 February Pinatar Cup	Chinese Taipei	0–4	China	San Pedro del Pinatar, Spain
13:00 UTC+1			Teng Pei-lin 21' (o.g.); Shao Ziqin 39'; Li Mengwen 50'; Zhang Xin 76'	Stadium: Pinatar Arena

25 February Pinatar Cup	China	0–2	Mexico	San Pedro del Pinatar, Spain
13:00 UTC+1			Soto 5'; Ovalle 14'	Stadium: Pinatar Arena

5 April Yongchuan International Tournament	China	5–0	Uzbekistan	Chongqing, China
15:30 UTC+8	Zhang Xin 43'; Shao Ziqin 45+2'; Li Mengwen 69'; Liu Jing 88' (pen.); Wang Yanwen 90'			Stadium: Yongchuan Sports Center; Referee: Azusa Sugino (Japan)

8 April Yongchuan International Tournament	China	5–1	Thailand	Chongqing, China
19:35 UTC+8				Stadium: Yongchuan Sports Center

May 31 Friendly	United States	3–0	China	Saint Paul, Minnesota
17:30 ET	Marcario 28'; Coffey 35'; Heaps 54'	Report		Stadium: Allianz Field; Referee: Carly Shaw-MacLaren (Canada)

9 July EAFF E-1 Football Championship	South Korea	2–2	China	Suwon, South Korea
20:00 UTC+9	Jang Sel-gi 45+1'; Ji So-yun 90+4'	Report	Yao Wei 15'; Shao Ziqin 67'	Stadium: Suwon World Cup Stadium; Attendance: 923; Referee: Bùi Thị Thu Trang (Vietnam)

13 July EAFF E-1 Football Championship	Chinese Taipei	2–4	China	Hwaseong, South Korea
16:30 UTC+9				Stadium: Hwaseong Stadium

16 July EAFF E-1 Football Championship	Japan	0–0	China	Suwon, South Korea
16:00 UTC+9				Stadium: Suwon World Cup Stadium

29 November Friendly	England	8–0	China	London, England
17:30	Mead 12', 14'; Hemp 16'; Stanway 23', 38' (pen.), 52'; Toone 71'; Russo 78'	Report		Stadium: Wembley Stadium; Attendance: 74,611; Referee: Ionela Peşu (Romania)

2 December ShePlays Tournament	Scotland	3–2	China	Jerez de la Frontera, Spain
19:00 UTC+1	Howat 10', 15'; Hanson 14'		Zhang Linyan 30'; Wu Chengshu 60'	Stadium: Estadio Municipal de Chapín

== 2026 ==
10 February Friendly	China	2–0	Vietnam	Shenzhen, China
--:-- UTC+8		Report		Stadium: Shenzhen Youth Football Training Base

13 February Friendly	China	6–1	Vietnam	Shenzhen, China
--:-- UTC+8				Stadium: Shenzhen Youth Football Training Base

3 March 2026 Asian Cup GS	China	2–0	Bangladesh	Sydney, Australia
19:00 UTC+11				Stadium: Western Sydney Stadium; Attendance: 6,006; Referee: Pansa Chaisanit (Thailand)

6 March 2026 Asian Cup GS	Uzbekistan	0–3	China	Sydney, Australia
19:00 UTC+11				Stadium: Western Sydney Stadium; Attendance: 8,322; Referee: Supiree Testhomya (Thailand)

9 March 2026 Asian Cup GS	North Korea	1–2	China	Sydney, Australia
20:00 UTC+11				Stadium: Western Sydney Stadium; Attendance: 9,093; Referee: Lê Thị Ly (Vietnam)

14 March 2026 Asian Cup QF	China	2–0 (a.e.t.)	Chinese Taipei	Perth, Australia
13:00 UTC+8				Stadium: Perth Rectangular Stadium; Referee: Oh Hyeon-jeong (South Korea)

17 March 2026 Asian Cup SF	China	1–2	Australia	Perth, Australia
18:00 UTC+8				Stadium: Perth Stadium; Referee: Supiree Testhomya (Thailand)

3 June Friendly	China	1–2	Russia	Wuhan, China
19:35 UTC+8				Stadium: Wuhan Five Rings Sports Center

7 June Friendly	China	0–1	Russia	Wuhan, China
19:00 UTC+8				Stadium: Wuhan Tazihu Football Training Center

9 September Friendly	China	3–0	Vietnam	Suzhou, China
--:-- UTC+8		Report

14 September 2026 Asian Games GS	China	–	Hong Kong	Gifu, Japan
19:00 UTC+9				Stadium: Gifu Nagaragawa Stadium

17 September 2026 Asian Games GS	Uzbekistan	–	China	Gifu, Japan
14:00 UTC+9				Stadium: Gifu Nagaragawa Stadium

21 September 2026 Asian Games GS	China	–	Philippines	Gifu, Japan
16:00 UTC+9				Stadium: Gifu Nagaragawa Stadium
