= 2022 AFC Women's Asian Cup final =

Final match of the 2022 Asian Women's Football Championship

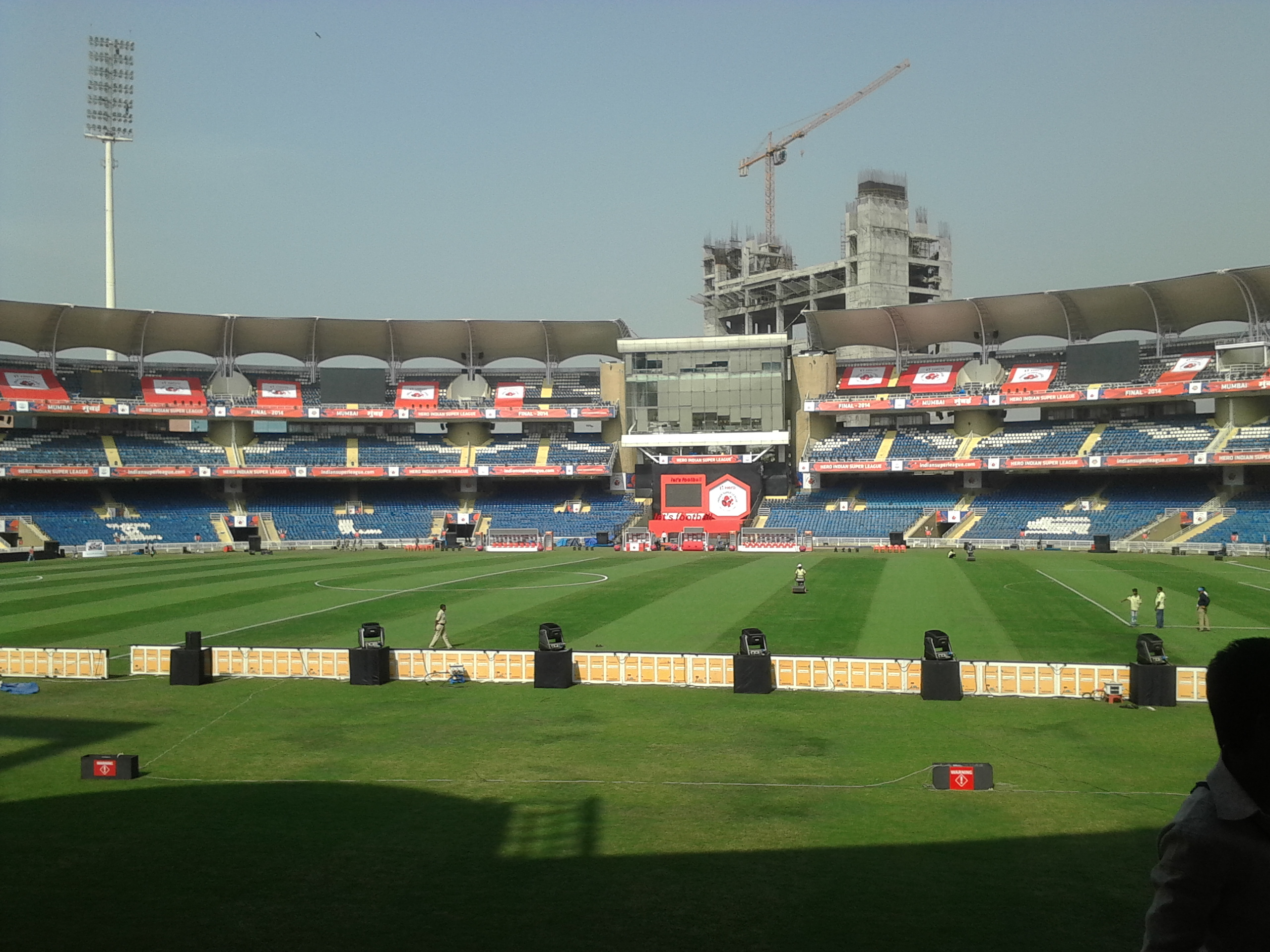
- DY Patil Stadium
- Event: 2022 AFC Women's Asian Cup
China PR	South Korea
3	2
- Date: 6 February 2022
- Venue: DY Patil Stadium, Navi Mumbai
- Referee: Casey Reibelt (Australia)
- Attendance: 0

The 2022 AFC Women's Asian Cup final was a football match between China PR and South Korea that took place on 6 February 2022. The match determined the winner of the 2022 AFC Women's Asian Cup at DY Patil Stadium in Navi Mumbai, India. It was the 20th final of the AFC Women's Asian Cup, a quadrennial tournament that consists of the women's national teams from the Asian Football Confederation to determine the best women's football country in Asia.

== Background ==
The 2022 AFC Women's Asian Cup is the twentieth edition of the AFC Women's Asian Cup–the women's premier tournament in the Asian Football Confederation–held from 20 January 2022 to 6 February 2022 in three cities in India. Qualifying rounds were held from 17 September 2021 to 24 October 2021, where twenty-eight countries in eight groups played in a round-robin tournament through a host in each. The top team in each group qualified for the final tournament, along with hosts India and the top three finishers of the 2018 AFC Women's Asian Cup. However, several adjustments were made due to the COVID-19 pandemic in Asia, as several teams withdrew along with postponements, resulting in some groups being uneven and the final tournament being postponed. In the final tournament, twelve teams were divided into three groups, where the top two teams in each group and the two best third-placed teams qualified for knockout stage. This tournament notably marks an expansion at the group and knockout stage, with 8 to 12 and 4 to 8 countries, respectively. Video assistant referee would be used at the knockout stage only.

Before the tournament, both China PR and South Korea were the fourth and third favorites to win it per FIFA, respectively. Both were behind Australia and Japan, with Australia being the favorites to win the cup. North Korea was the highest ranked member of the AFC, but they withdrew at the qualifiers round due to the COVID-19 pandemic. China PR is historically the most successful team, with eight championships under their belt (their last being in 2006). For South Korea, this is their first finals appearance in history, although they have finished at the semifinals four times. China PR leads the all-time series against South Korea, with a 16–5–7 record.

== Venue ==
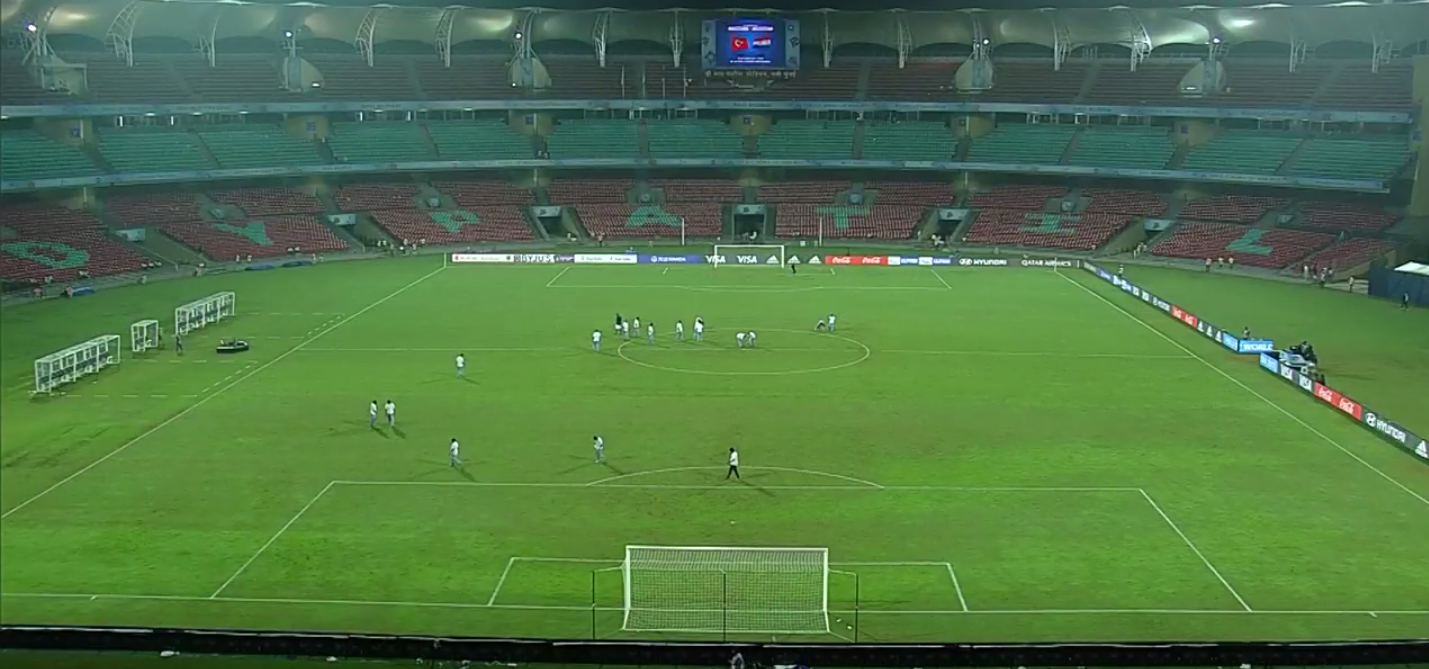
A 2017 FIFA U-17 World Cup match occurring at the stadium.

The DY Patil Stadium is a sports stadium with a capacity of 55,000 located in Navi Mumbai, India. Although the stadium is primarily used for cricket, football has been an increasingly popular sport at the pitch. For example, the stadium held multiple matches in football in the 2017 FIFA U-17 World Cup, most notably at the semifinals stage between Mali and Spain. The stadium will also host matches at the 2022 FIFA U-17 Women's World Cup. In addition, the stadium serves as a home to Mumbai City FC, who is currently a member at the top division of the Indian Super League. Out of the three venues in this tournament, the stadium was selected to host the final on 26 March 2021 due to the capacity, infrastructure, and facilities provided.

== Route to the final ==
China
Round
South Korea
Opponents
Results
Group stage
Opponents
Results
Chinese Taipei
4–0
Match 1
Vietnam
3–0
Iran
7–0
Match 2
Myanmar
2–0
India
Void
Match 3
Japan
1–1
Group A winners

Pos	Team	Pld	W	D	L	GF	GA	GD	Pts
1	China	2	2	0	0	11	0	+11	6
2	Chinese Taipei	2	1	0	1	5	4	+1	3
3	Iran	2	0	0	2	0	12	−12	0
4	India (H)	0	0	0	0	0	0	0	0

Final standings
Group C runners-up

Pos	Team	Pld	W	D	L	GF	GA	GD	Pts
1	Japan	3	2	1	0	9	1	+8	7
2	South Korea	3	2	1	0	6	1	+5	7
3	Vietnam	3	0	1	2	2	8	−6	1
4	Myanmar	3	0	1	2	2	9	−7	1

Opponents
Results
Knockout stage
Opponents
Results
Vietnam
3–1
Quarters
Australia
1–0
Japan
2–2 (a.e.t.; 4–3 p)
Semis
Philippines
2–0

=== China PR ===
China PR qualified for the tournament by placing in the top three in the 2018 AFC Women's Asian Cup. China PR at this tournament finished third by defeating Thailand 3–1. Due to their success, China PR was placed in pot two out of four at the draw. China PR was drawn in Group A along with Chinese Taipei, hosts India, and Iran. The first match in this group resulted in a 4–0 win against Chinese Taipei. In this match, former PSG midfielder Wang Shuang scored two goals: a penalty in the 3rd minute and another in the 69th minute. Two other goals came from Wang Shanshan and Zhang Xin in the 9th and 53rd minute, respectively. The next match was a 7–0 rout against Iran. Wang Shuang and Wang Shanshan both scored two goals each, while Xiao Yuyi, Tottenham Hotspur midfielder Tang Jiali, and an own goal made up the rest. The last match in Group A was supposed to be against India, but India withdrew due to the COVID-19 pandemic. As the winners of Group A, China PR next defeated Vietnam 3–1 in the quarter-finals. The match initially was in Vietnam's favor due to a goal by Nguyễn Thị Tuyết Dung in the 11th minute. However, China PR fought back through three goals by the 53rd minute from Wang Shuang, Wang Shanshan, and Tang Jiali. In the semi-finals, China PR made an upset against Japan women's national football team, who was projected to finish 2nd per FIFA. Goals were made by Wu Chengshu and Wang Shanshan in the 46th and 119th minute, respectively. After the overtime period was over, China defeated Japan 4–3 in a penalty shoot-out. The biggest feats in this match were that the only two shots on goal ended up scoring, and Japan had six. The four saves made by Zhu Yu was one of the biggest reasons why this result occurred.

=== South Korea ===
As South Korea did not finish in the top three at the 2018 AFC Women's Asian Cup, South Korea had to go through the qualifiers to make the final tournament. South Korea swept Group E by defeating hosts Uzbekistan 4–0 and Mongolia 12–0 to qualify. As a result of their performance in 2018, South Korea was placed in pot two out of four in the draw. South Korea was drawn into Group C with Japan, Myanmar, and Vietnam. The first match against Vietnam resulted in a score of 3–0, which consisted of two goals from Chelsea F.C. midfielder Ji So-yun and an own goal. The second match against Myanmar resulted in a 2–0 score, featuring one goal each from Ji So-yun and Brighton & Hove Albion forward Lee Geum-min. The final match of the group stage resulted in a 1–1 draw against Japan, with the lone goal coming from Seo Ji-youn in the 85th minute. In the quarter-finals, South Korea was up against tournament favorites and 2023 FIFA Women's World Cup hosts Australia per FIFA. South Korea upset the Matildas with a 1–0 defeat, featuring a goal from Ji So-yun in the 87th minute. The South Korea defense was the most invaluable, as Australia beat South Korea in corners, possession, pass accuracy, passes, and discipline. However, Australia only had two shots on target in comparison to South Korea's three. In the semifinals, South Korea was up against the Philippines, who just qualified for their first FIFA Women's World Cup appearance and was on a cinderella run from defeating Thailand and Chinese Taipei, who both were nearly thirty spots above the Philippines in the FIFA Women's World Rankings. Nevertheless, South Korea regressed the Philippines through a 2–0 win. The two goals came from Tottenham Hotspur midfielder Cho So-hyun and Son Hwa-yeon in the 4th and 34th minute, respectively.

== Details ==
6 February 2022
16:30

China	3–2	South Korea
Tang Jiali 68' (pen.); Zhang Linyan 72'; Xiao Yuyi 90+3'	Report (FIFA); Report (AFC)	Choe Yu-ri 27'; Ji So-yun 45+3' (pen.)

DY Patil Stadium, Navi Mumbai
Attendance: 0
Referee: Casey Reibelt (Australia)

China PR

Team stats
China PR	Statistics	South Korea
14	Shots	11
6	Shots on target	5
60%	Possession	40%
504	Passes	338
78%	Pass accuracy	64%
8	Fouls	13
3	Yellow cards	0
0	Red cards	0
1	Offsides	1
1	Corners	3

South Korea

GK	1	Zhu Yu
RB	14	Lou Jiahui		(substituted off) 46'
CB	3	Wang Xiaoxue
CB	11	Wang Shanshan (c)
LB	8	Yao Wei	(yellow card) 88'
RM	15	Wu Chengshu		(substituted off) 46'
CM	16	Yao Lingwei
CM	23	Gao Chen	(yellow card) 55'
LM	6	Zhang Xin	(yellow card) 89'
CF	7	Wang Shuang		(substituted off) 60'
CF	18	Tang Jiali		(substituted off) 90+6'
Substitutions:
MF	10	Zhang Rui		(substituted on) 46'
FW	20	Xiao Yuyi		(substituted on) 46'
FW	19	Zhang Linyan		(substituted on) 60'
MF	9	Wang Yanwen		(substituted on) 90+6'
Manager:
Shui Qingxia

GK	18	Kim Jung-mi
RB	20	Kim Hye-ri (c)
CB	6	Lim Seon-joo
CB	4	Shim Seo-yeon
LB	2	Choo Hyo-joo
DM	17	Lee Young-ju	(substituted off) 82'
CM	10	Ji So-yun
CM	8	Cho So-hyun
RW	11	Choe Yu-ri
LW	13	Lee Geum-min
CF	23	Son Hwa-yeon
Substitutions:
DF	16	Jang Sel-gi	(substituted on) 82'
Manager:
(England) Colin Bell

Assistant referees:
Joanna Charaktis (Australia)
Heba Saadieh (Palestine)
Fourth official:
Ranjita Devi Tekcham (India)
Reserve assistant referee:
Supawan Hinthong (Thailand)
Video assistant referee:
Kate Jacewicz (Australia)
Assistant video assistant referee:
Lara Lee (Australia)

== Aftermath ==
This final served as a cardio-tonic agent for Chinese football following the men's team's elimination from the 2022 FIFA World Cup after consecutive losses against Japan and especially Vietnam, which happened on the Chinese New Year. Fans mocked the team to the extent that they called for more funding to the women's side on Sina Weibo. Most notably, one fan wrote, "The men's team is the son who had taken up all of the wealth but achieved nothing, while the women is the daughter who was wronged but is very hopeful."

CCTV-5, China's national sports channel, took time out of the simultaneous Winter Olympic Games in Beijing to broadcast the final. Mengniu Dairy gave a prize of US$1.57 million to the team for their championship.
