= Wang Yanwen =

Wang Yanwen may refer to:

- Wang Yanwen (footballer)
- Wang Yanwen (politician)
