= Lingwei =

Lingwei can refer to:

- Gao Lingwei (Chinese: 高凌霨), Qing dynasty and Republic of China politician
- Kong Lingwei (Chinese: 孔令微; born 1995), Chinese sprinter
- Li Lingwei (Chinese: 高凌霨; born 1964), Chinese badminton player
- Li Lingwei (javelin thrower) (Chinese: 李玲蔚; born 1989), Chinese javelin thrower
- Yao Lingwei (Chinese: 姚凌薇; born 1995), Chinese football midfielder
