= 2024 Yongchuan International Tournament =

Tournament details
- Host country: China
- City: Chongqing
- Dates: 23–29 October 2024
- Teams: 3 (from 1 confederation)
- Venue: 1 (in 1 host city)

Final positions
- Champions: China (5th title)
- Runners-up: Vietnam
- Third place: Uzbekistan

Tournament statistics
- Matches played: 3
- Goals scored: 7 (2.33 per match)

The 2024 Yongchuan International Tournament (Chinese: 2024年茶山竹海杯永川国际女子足球邀请赛) was the 6th edition of the Yongchuan International Tournament, an invitational women's football tournament held in Yongchuan District, Chongqing, China. The tournament took place from 23 to 29 October 2024.

== Teams ==
Team	FIFA Rankings (August 2024)
China (host)	18
Vietnam	37
Uzbekistan	48

== Venues ==
Chongqing	Yongchuan Sports Center is located in China
Yongchuan Sports Center	Yongchuan Sports Center is located in China
29.345833°N 105.933611°E	Yongchuan Sports Center is located in China
Capacity: 25,017	Yongchuan Sports Center is located in China

== Matches ==
All times are local, CST (UTC+8).

Pos	Team	Pld	W	D	L	GF	GA	GD	Pts	Qualification
1	China (H)	2	2	0	0	5	0	+5	6	Champions
2	Vietnam	2	1	0	1	2	2	0	3	Runners-up
3	Uzbekistan	2	0	0	2	0	5	−5	0	Third place

(H) Hosts
23 October 2024
15:30

Vietnam	2–0	Uzbekistan
Nguyễn Thị Tuyết Dung 4'; Phạm Hải Yến 35'

Yongchuan Sports Center, Chongqing

26 October 2024
20:00

China	3–0	Uzbekistan
Wang Yanwen 29'; Chen Qiaozhu 54'; Tang Jiali 82'

Yongchuan Sports Center, Chongqing

29 October 2024
19:35

China	2–0	Vietnam
Zhang Xin 41'; Trần Thị Thu Thảo 90+3' (o.g.)

Yongchuan Sports Center, Chongqing
