= Pan Yen-hsin =

Taiwanese footballer

Personal information
- Date of birth: 18 February 1996 (age 30)
- Place of birth: Taipei, Taiwan
- Height: 1.62 m (5 ft 4 in)
- Position: Midfielder

Team information
- Current team: Inter Taoyuan

Senior career*
Years	Team	Apps	(Gls)
2019	Taipei Bravo		
2020–	Inter Taoyuan		

International career^{‡}
2013–2015	Chinese Taipei U19		(4)
2016–	Chinese Taipei	10	(0)
- * Club domestic league appearances and goals ‡ National team caps and goals as of 10 February 2020

Pan Yen-hsin (Chinese: 潘彥昕; born 18 February 1996) is a Taiwanese footballer who plays as a midfielder for Taiwan Mulan Football League club Inter Taoyuan and the Chinese Taipei women's national team.

== International goals ==
No.	Date	Venue	Opponent	Score	Result	Competition
1.	5 April 2023	Fouad Chehab Stadium, Jounieh, Lebanon	Lebanon	3–1	5–1	2024 AFC Women's Olympic Qualifying Tournament
