= Tsang Pak Tung =

Hong Kong footballer (born 2004)

Tsang Pak Tung (Chinese: 曾柏同; born 25 January 2004) is a Hong Kong footballer who plays as a defender for Tai Po.

== Early life and education ==
Tsang started playing football at the age of ten. She attended Jockey Club Ti-I College in Hong Kong.

== Club career ==
Tsang played for Hong Kong side Tai Po, where she captained the club and was regarded as one of their most important players.

== International career ==
Tsang represented Hong Kong internationally at youth level and senior level.

== Style of play ==
Tsang mainly operates as a defender and is known for her speed.

== Personal life ==
Tsang has a brother.
