= Lương Thị Thu Thương =

Vietnamese footballer (born 2000)

Personal information
- Date of birth: 1 May 2000 (age 26)
- Place of birth: Móng Cái, Quảng Ninh, Vietnam
- Height: 1.68 m (5 ft 6 in)
- Positions: Centre-back; sweeper

Team information
- Current team: Than Khoáng Sản
- Number: 26

Senior career*
Years	Team	Apps	(Gls)
2016–	Than Khoáng Sản	41	(1)

International career^{‡}
2017–2019	Vietnam U20	4	(0)
2019–	Vietnam	31	(0)
- * Club domestic league appearances and goals ‡ National team caps and goals as of 29 September 2021

Lương Thị Thu Thương (born 1 May 2000) is a Vietnamese footballer who plays as a centre-back or a sweeper for Vietnam Women's Championship club Than Khoáng Sản and the Vietnamese national team.

== International Apps ==
As of match played 01 August 2023

Appearances and goals by national team and year
National Team	Year	Apps	Goals
Vietnam	2020	3	0
Vietnam	2021	2	0
Vietnam	2022	14	0
Vietnam	2023	7	0
Total		26	0
