= Wang Xiaoxue =

Chinese association football player

Personal information
- Date of birth: 20 October 1994 (age 32)
- Place of birth: Jiangyin, China
- Position: Defender

Team information
- Current team: Jiangsu

International career
Years	Team	Apps	(Gls)
	China	10	(0)

Wang Xiaoxue is a Chinese professional association football player who plays as a defender for Jiangsu in the Chinese Women's Super League.
