= Kanjanaporn Saenkhun =

Thai footballer (born 1996)

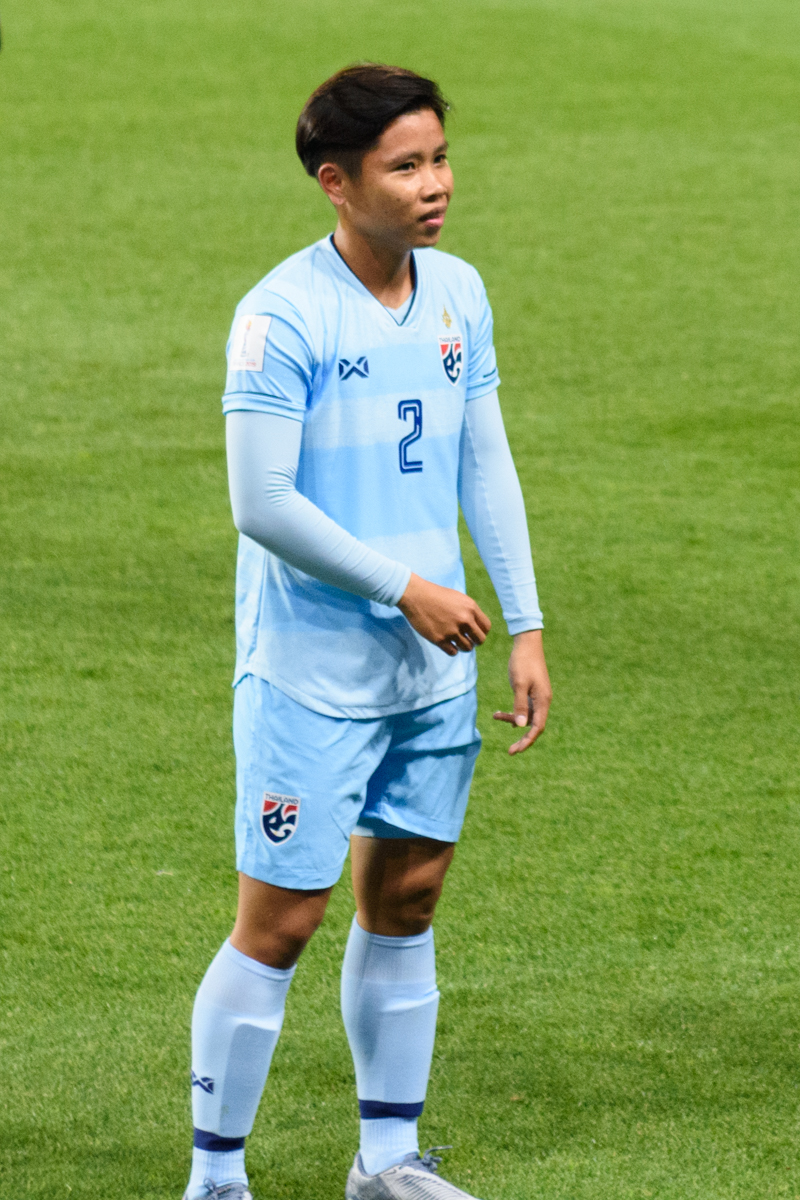

Personal information
- Full name: Kanjanaporn Saenkhun
- Date of birth: 18 July 1996 (age 30)
- Place of birth: Loei, Thailand
- Height: 1.61 m (5 ft 3 in)
- Position: Defender

Team information
- Current team: BG-Bundit Asia
- Number: 4

International career
Years	Team	Apps	(Gls)
2013–	Thailand	24	(0)

Kanjanaporn Saenkhun (Thai: กาญจนาพร แสนคุณ; born 18 July 1996) is a Thai international footballer who plays as a midfielder for BG-Bundit Asia.

She was selected for the 2019 FIFA Women's World Cup. On the club level, she plays for BG-Bundit Asia.
