= Xiao Yuyi =

Chinese female international footballer

Xiao Yuyi 肖裕仪
Personal information
- Full name: Xiao Yuyi
- Date of birth: 10 January 1996 (age 30)
- Place of birth: Shantou, Guangdong, China
- Height: 1.65 m (5 ft 5 in)
- Position: Midfielder

Team information
- Current team: Shanghai Shengli

Senior career*
Years	Team	Apps	(Gls)
- Shanghai Shengli
2022–2023	→ Adelaide United (loan)	9	(0)

International career^{‡}
2012	China U17	3	(0)
2013–2015	China U19		(3)
2014	China U20	2	(0)
2017–	China	42	(7)
Medal record
Women's football
Representing China
Asian Games
Silver medal – second place	2018 Palembang	Team
- * Club domestic league appearances and goals as of 12 February 2023 ‡ National team caps and goals as of 30 July 2023

Xiao Yuyi (simplified Chinese: 肖裕仪; traditional Chinese: 肖裕儀; pinyin: Xiāo Yùyí; born 10 January 1996) is a Chinese international association football player who plays for the China women's national football team and Shanghai Shengli of the Chinese Women's Super League (CWSL).

== Club career ==
In November 2022, Xiao was loaned to Australian club Adelaide United. In February 2023, she ended her loan early so she could have more opportunities to train with the national team ahead of the 2023 FIFA Women's World Cup.

== International career ==
Xiao is seemed as the Miss Fortune of China women's national football team. At the second leg of Olympic qualifying against South Korea, she made an assist to equalize the score to 2–2. She also scored the winning goal in the 2022 AFC Women's Asian Cup final against South Korea in injury time.

== International goals ==
No.	Date	Venue	Opponent	Score	Result	Competition
1.	21 October 2017	Yongchuan Sports Center, Chongqing, China	Mexico	1–1	3–2	2017 Yongchuan International Tournament
2.	25 August 2018	Gelora Sriwijaya Stadium, Palembang, Indonesia	Thailand	2–0	5–0	2018 Asian Games
3.	5 December 2018	Guam Football Association National Training Center, Dededo, Guam	Chinese Taipei	2–0	2–0	2019 EAFF E-1 Football Championship
4.	23 January 2022	Mumbai Football Arena, Mumbai, India	Iran	2–0	7–0	2022 AFC Women's Asian Cup
5.	6 February 2022	DY Patil Stadium, Navi Mumbai, India	South Korea	3–2	3–2	2022 AFC Women's Asian Cup
6.	16 February 2022	Marbella Football Center, Marbella, Spain	Sweden	1–3	1–4	Friendly

== Honours ==
China

- Asian Games silver medalist: 2018
- AFC Women's Asian Cup: 2022
