= Lim Seon-joo =

South Korean footballer (born 1990)

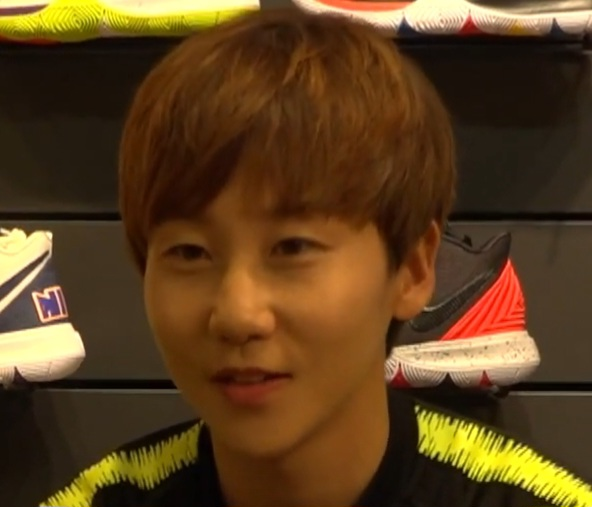

Personal information
- Date of birth: 27 November 1990 (age 35)
- Place of birth: Seogwipo, South Korea
- Height: 1.68 m (5 ft 6 in)
- Position: Centre-back

Team information
- Current team: Seoul City Hall
- Number: 26

Senior career*
Years	Team	Apps	(Gls)
2011–2025	Incheon Hyundai	252	(21)
2026–	Seoul City Hall	3	(0)

International career^{‡}
2008–2010	South Korea U20	16	(2)
2009–	South Korea	105	(6)
- * Club domestic league appearances and goals as of 15 June 2026 ‡ National team caps and goals as of 25 July 2023

Lim Seon-joo (Korean: 임선주, Korean pronunciation: [im.sʌn.dʑu]; born 27 November 1990) is a South Korean footballer who plays as a centre-back for WK League side Seoul City Hall and the South Korean national team. She is one of the South Korean women's team's most capped players, having played at two World Cups, four Asian Cups, two Asian Games and four East Asian Cups.

== Early life ==
Lim was born in Seogwipo in Jeju Province. After graduating from Nohyung Elementary School in Jeju City, she moved to Ulsan to pursue football seriously, attending Hyundai Chungeun Middle School and Hyundai High School. Lim continued her youth career at Hanyang Women's University. She played an important role in Hanyang's victory at the 2010 Unification Cup.

== Club career ==
Lim was selected by Incheon Hyundai Steel Red Angels as the first overall pick at the 2011 WK League new players' draft. She captained the side from 2020 to 2021, leading the Red Angels to their eighth and ninth consecutive WK League titles. Lim won a total of eleven consecutive WK League titles with Incheon Hyundai. She transferred to Seoul City in 2026 but sustained an injury in the team's season opener against Suwon FC.

== International career ==
=== South Korea youth teams ===
Lim was part of the South Korean team that won the gold medal at the 2009 Summer Universiade, the country's best ever finish in women's football at the competition. She was then a key player in the South Korean squad that came in third place at the 2010 FIFA U-20 Women's World Cup, the first South Korean national team to finish third in a FIFA tournament.

=== South Korea ===
Lim made her full international debut for South Korea in 2009. She scored in her debut match, a 19–0 victory against the Northern Mariana Islands in the qualifying tournament for the 2010 EAFF Women's Football Championship. Lim made her major tournament debut at the 2010 AFC Women's Asian Cup. She went on to play in the 2014, 2018, and 2022 editions of the tournament.

Lim played at the 2014 Asian Games in Incheon, where South Korea faced North Korea in the semi-final. Lim scored an own goal, and the match ended as a 1–2 loss for South Korea, ending their hopes of a gold medal. The side went on to beat Vietnam in the 3rd-4th place playoff to win bronze. Four years later, at the 2018 Asian Games in Indonesia, South Korea once again reached the semi-finals, where they faced Japan. The score was level until late in the match, when Lim again scored an own goal, which sealed victory for the Japanese side, who went on to win the tournament.

Lim appeared in her first FIFA Women's World Cup at the 2015 edition of the tournament. She played in South Korea's group stage match against Costa Rica. She was also included in the squad for the 2023 World Cup despite an injury in the build-up to the tournament. She played in South Korea's opening group match against Colombia and was named in the starting eleven for the following match, against Morocco, but was replaced at the last minute by Shim Seo-yeon after experiencing pain in her leg during pre-match warm-ups.

In 2023, Lim became the seventh Korean woman to join the FIFA Century Club as she reached the milestone of 100 A match appearances.

== Career statistics ==
=== International ===
As of match played 30 May 2025

Appearances and goals by national team and year
National team	Year	Apps	Goals
South Korea	2009	2	1
South Korea	2010	1	0
South Korea	2011	2	0
South Korea	2012	6	0
South Korea	2013	13	0
South Korea	2014	15	0
South Korea	2015	9	0
South Korea	2016	7	2
South Korea	2017	7	0
South Korea	2018	10	2
South Korea	2019	6	0
South Korea	2020	0	0
South Korea	2021	8	1
South Korea	2022	13	0
South Korea	2023	6	0
South Korea	2024	1	0
South Korea	2025	4	0
Total		110	6

Scores and results list South Korea's goal tally first, score column indicates score after each Lim Seon-joo goal.

List of international goals scored by Lim Seon-joo
No.	Date	Venue	Opponent	Score	Result	Competition	Ref.
1	26 August 2009	Tainan County Stadium, Tainan, Taiwan	Northern Mariana Islands	3–0	19–0	2010 EAFF Women's Football Championship qualifiers	
2	9 March 2016	Nagai Stadium, Osaka, Japan	Vietnam	2–0	4–0	2016 Olympic Games qualifiers	
3	9 March 2016	Nagai Stadium, Osaka, Japan	Vietnam	3–0	4–0	2016 Olympic Games qualifiers	
4	16 April 2018	Amman International Stadium, Amman, Jordan	Philippines	3–0	5–0	2018 AFC Women's Asian Cup	
5	21 August 2018	Gelora Sriwijaya Stadium, Palembang, Indonesia	Indonesia	3–0	12–0	2018 Asian Games	
6	27 November 2021	Goyang Stadium, Goyang, South Korea	New Zealand	2–1	2–1	Friendly	

== Honours ==
=== Incheon Hyundai Steel Red Angels ===
- WK League
  - Champions: 2013, 2014, 2015, 2016, 2017, 2018, 2019, 2020, 2021, 2022, 2023

=== South Korea Universiade ===
- Summer Universiade
  - Champions: 2009

=== South Korea U-20 ===
- FIFA U-20 Women's World Cup
  - Third place: 2010

=== South Korea ===
- Asian Games
  - Third place: 2014
