= Heba Saadia =

Palestinian association football referee

- هبه سعدية
- Born: January 3, 1989 (age 37); Yarmouk Camp, Damascus, Syria
- Occupation: Association football referee
- Notable work: Officiating at the 2023 FIFA Women's World Cup

Heba Saadia (Arabic: هبه سعدية, romanized: Hība Saʿadiyya, also Saadieh) is a Palestinian association football referee.

== Early life ==
Heba Saadia was born to Palestinian parents in Yarmouk Camp, a Palestinian refugee community, in Damascus, Syria.

She started playing football with aspirations to play for the Palestine national team, and studied physical education from Damascus University.

== Career ==
She became a referee after she was unable to move forward in her career as a player. Saadia considered refereeing when she saw a group of referees with no women and, after inquiring about the lack, the group suggested she join. In Syria, she was a fourth official in league matches; having to flee Syria when the civil war broke out, she relocated first to Malaysia and then to Sweden, living in Stockholm, where she got her FIFA referee license. She refereed division 1 league games in Sweden and obtained her international badge in 2016.

Besides the football associations of the countries she worked in, Saadia also trained with the Palestinian Football Association (PFA) and Asian Football Confederation (AFC) to build fitness, wanting to excel as a referee. The PFA and AFC gave regular reports of her training to FIFA, who responded with observations on which she built.

Having officiated at women's AFC Asian Cups and the 2020 Summer Olympics, as well as in men's international football at the Maurice Revello Tournament and 2023 AFC U-20 Asian Cup, Saadia was named as an official to the 2023 FIFA Women's World Cup in January 2023, becoming the first Palestinian referee of any gender to be appointed to a World Cup finals tournament. She will serve as an assistant referee at the tournament.
