= Wu Chengshu =

Chinese footballer

Wu Chengshu 吴澄舒
Personal information
- Full name: Wu Chengshu
- Date of birth: 26 August 1996 (age 30)
- Place of birth: Jiangyin, Jiangsu, China
- Height: 1.66 m (5 ft 5 in)
- Position: Midfielder

Senior career*
Years	Team	Apps	(Gls)
2019–2022	Jiangsu	30	(13)
2022–2023	Canberra United	10	(2)
2023–2026	Dijon	38	(9)

International career^{‡}
2019–	China	24	(2)
- * Club domestic league appearances and goals as of 3 October 2025 (UTC) ‡ National team caps and goals as of 08:50, 2 December 2025 (UTC)

Wu Chengshu (Chinese: 吴澄舒; pinyin: Wú Chéngshū, born 26 August 1996) is a Chinese footballer, who plays as a midfielder for the China national team.

== Career ==
Member of the Jiangsu football team, she joined Canberra United for the 2022–23 season.

In August 2023, Wu joined French club Dijon.

Wu was a member of the China squad for 2022 AFC Women's Asian Cup.

== Career statistics ==
=== Club ===
As of match played 27 September 2025

Appearances and goals by club, season and competition
Club	Season	League			National cup (Note: Includes Coupe de France)		Total	
Club	Season	Division	Apps	Goals	Apps	Goals	Apps	Goals
Canberra United	2022–23	A-League	10	2	—		10	2
Dijon FCO	2023–24	D1 Féminine	16	3	1	0	17	3
Dijon FCO	2024–25	Première Ligue	19	6	3	1	22	6
Dijon FCO	2025–26	Première Ligue	3	0	0	0	3	0
Dijon FCO	Total		38	9	4	1	42	10
Career total			48	11	4	1	52	12

=== International ===
As of match played 2 December 2025

Appearances and goals by national team and year
National team	Year	Apps	Goals
China	2016	1	0
China	2019	5	0
China	2022	7	1
China	2023	5	0
China	2024	5	0
China	2025	1	1
Total		24	2

Scores and results list China's goal tally first, score column indicates score after each Wu goal.

List of international goals scored by Wu Chengshu
No.	Date	Venue	Opponent	Score	Result	Competition
1	3 February 2022	Shree Shiv Chhatrapati Sports Complex, Pune, India	Japan	1–1	2–2 (a.e.t.) (5–4 p)	2022 AFC Women's Asian Cup
2	2 December 2025	Estadio Municipal de Chapín, Jerez de la Frontera, Spain	Scotland	2–3	2–3	Friendly

== Honours ==
China

- AFC Women's Asian Cup: 2022

== See also ==
- Football in China
