= Shui Qingxia =

Chinese footballer and manager (born 1966)

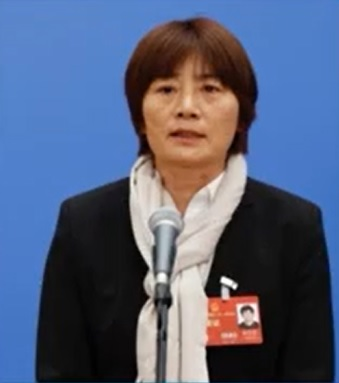

Personal information
- Full name: Shui Qingxia
- Date of birth: 18 December 1966 (age 59)
- Place of birth: Funing, China
- Height: 1.67 m (5 ft 6 in)
- Position: Midfielder

Senior career*
Years	Team	Apps	(Gls)
- Shanghai

International career
1991–2000	China		

Managerial career
- 2021–2023: China
Medal record
Women's football
Representing China
Olympic Games
Silver medal – second place	1996 Atlanta	Team
Asian Games
Gold medal – first place	1994 Hiroshima	Team
Gold medal – first place	1998 Bangkok	Team
- * Club domestic league appearances and goals

Shui Qingxia (Chinese: 水庆霞; pinyin: Shuǐ Qìngxiá; born 18 December 1966) is a Chinese football manager and former player who last served as the head coach of the China women's national team. As a player, she competed as a midfielder for the China in the 1996 and 2000 Olympic football tournaments.

== Playing career ==
In 1996, Shui won the silver medal with the Chinese team. She played all five matches.

Four years later she was a squad member of the Chinese team which finished fifth in the women's tournament, but she did not see any action.

== Managerial career ==
In September 2021, Shui coached the "United Team", made up largely of international players, at the 2021 National Games of China. On 18 November 2021, she was appointed as manager of the China women's national team, becoming the first Chinese woman to lead the team. She led the team to win the 2022 AFC Women's Asian Cup, the country's first Women's Asian Cup title in sixteen years.

== Career statistics ==
=== International goals ===
No.	Date	Venue	Opponent	Score	Result	Competition
1.	24 September 1995	Kota Kinabalu, Malaysia	Philippines	?–0	21–0	1995 AFC Women's Championship
2.	30 September 1995	Kota Kinabalu, Malaysia	South Korea	4–0	4–0	1995 AFC Women's Championship
3.	12 December 1997	Guangdong, China	Chinese Taipei	7–0	10–0	1997 AFC Women's Championship
4.	4 June 2000	Sydney, Australia	Japan	2–0	2–0	2000 Pacific Cup
5.	24 June 2000	Foxborough, United States	Guatemala	11–0	14–0	2000 CONCACAF Women's Gold Cup
6.	24 June 2000	Foxborough, United States	Guatemala	12–0	14–0	2000 CONCACAF Women's Gold Cup
7.	24 June 2000	Foxborough, United States	Guatemala	14–0	14–0	2000 CONCACAF Women's Gold Cup
8.	1 July 2000	Louisville, United States	Brazil	1–0	2–3 (a.e.t.)	2000 CONCACAF Women's Gold Cup
