= Zhang Linyan =

Chinese footballer (born 2001)

Zhang Linyan 张琳艳
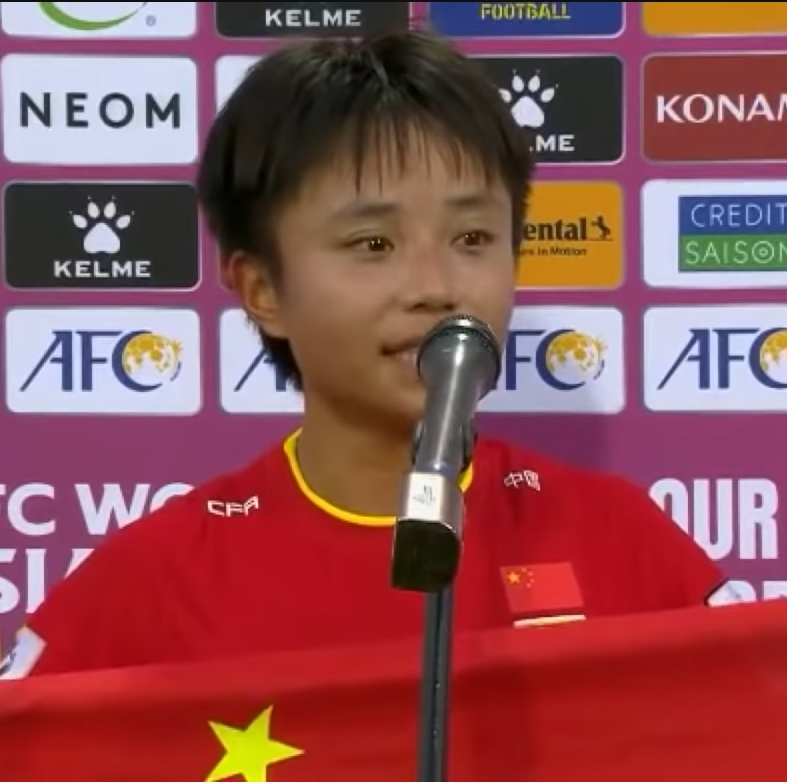

Personal information
- Date of birth: 16 January 2001 (age 25)
- Place of birth: Jiangyou, Sichuan, China
- Height: 1.54 m (5 ft 1 in)
- Position: Forward

Team information
- Current team: Tottenham Hotspur
- Number: 18

Youth career
- 2012–2019: Evergrande Football School

Senior career*
Years	Team	Apps	(Gls)
2019–2020	Beijing BG Phoenix	17	(3)
2021	Guangzhou	9	(9)
2022–	Wuhan Jianghan University	14	(9)
2022–2023	→ Grasshoppers (loan)	19	(9)
2023	→ Tottenham Hotspur (loan)	3	(0)

International career^{‡}
2018	China U20	3	(1)
2022–	China	32	(5)
- * Club domestic league appearances and goals as of 04:04, 27 November 2023 (UTC) ‡ National team caps and goals as of 08:30, 27 December 2025 (UTC)

Zhang Linyan (Chinese: 张琳艳; pinyin: Zhāng Línyàn; born 16 January 2001) is a Chinese footballer who plays as a forward for Chinese Women's Super League club Wuhan Jianghan University and the China national team.

== Career ==
Zhang is a product of Evergrande International Football School.

She was part of the China squad which reached the gold at the 2022 AFC Women's Asian Cup. After her performance, David Beckham congratulated her in social media.

In July 2022, Zhang joined Swiss Women's Super League club Grasshopper Club Zürich on loan from the Chinese Women's Super League club Wuhan Jianghan University F.C.

On 14 September 2023, it was announced that Zhang joined Tottenham Hotspur on loan for the 2023–24 season. On 11 October 2023, she made her debut for the team in a 6–0 victory against Reading in the league cup, in which she scored her debut goal in the 10th minute.

== Career statistics ==
=== Club ===
As of match played 26 November 2023

Appearances and goals by club, season and competition
Club	Season	League			National cup (Note: Includes Women's FA Cup, Swiss Women's Cup, Chinese FA Cup)		League cup (Note: Includes FA WSL Cup)		Total	
Club	Season	Division	Apps	Goals	Apps	Goals	Apps	Goals	Apps	Goals
Beijing BG Phoenix	2019	CWSL	4	0	0	0	—		4	0
Beijing BG Phoenix	2020	CWSL	13	3	0	0	—		13	3
Beijing BG Phoenix	Total		17	3	0	0	—		17	3
Guangzhou	2021	CWSL	9	9	6	5	—		15	14
Wuhan Jianghan University	2022	CWSL	10	6	2	0	—		12	6
Wuhan Jianghan University	2023	CWSL	4	3	0	0	—		4	3
Wuhan Jianghan University	Total		14	9	2	0	—		16	9
Grasshoppers (loan)	2022–23	Swiss Women's Super League	19	9	3	2	—		22	11
Tottenham Hotspurs (loan)	2023–24	Women's Super League	2	0	0	0	2	1	4	1
Career total			61	30	11	7	2	1	74	38

=== International ===
As of match played 2 December 2025

Appearances and goals by national team and year
National team	Year	Apps	Goals
China	2018	1	0
China	2019	0	0
China	2020	3	0
China	2021	0	0
China	2022	7	2
China	2023	14	1
China	2024	2	1
China	2025	5	1
Total		32	5

Scores and results list China's goal tally first, score column indicates score after each Zhang goal.

List of international goals scored by Zhang Linyan
No.	Date	Venue	Opponent	Score	Result	Competition	Ref.
1	6 February 2022	DY Patil Stadium, Navi Mumbai, India	South Korea	2–2	3–2	2022 AFC Women's Asian Cup	
2	20 July 2022	Kashima Soccer Stadium, Kashima, Japan	Chinese Taipei	1–0	2–0	2022 EAFF E-1 Football Championship	
3	3 October 2023	Linping Sports Center Stadium, Hangzhou, China	Japan	2–4	3–4	2022 Asian Games	
4	31 May 2024	Adelaide Oval, Adelaide, Australia	Australia	1–0	1–1	Friendly	
5	2 December 2025	Estadio Municipal de Chapín, Jerez de la Frontera, Spain	Scotland	1–3	2–3	Friendly	
6	17 March 2026	Perth Stadium, Perth, Australia	Australia	1–1	1–2	2026 AFC Women's Asian Cup	
7	17 September 2026	Gifu Nagaragawa Stadium, Gifu, China	Uzbekistan	1–1	1–1	2026 Asian Games	

== Honours ==
China

- AFC Women's Asian Cup: 2022

Individual

- SAFP Women Super League Golden Player: 2022–23
- SAFP Golden 11: 2022–23
