= Tang Jiali (footballer) =

Chinese footballer

Tang Jiali 唐佳丽
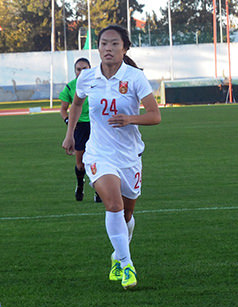
- Tang Jiali representing China in 2015

Personal information
- Date of birth: 16 March 1995 (age 31)
- Place of birth: Linkou, Mudanjiang, Heilongjiang, China
- Height: 1.66 m (5 ft 5 in)
- Position: Midfielder

Team information
- Current team: Shanghai Shengli
- Number: 18

Senior career*
Years	Team	Apps	(Gls)
2013–2016	Jiangsu Suning		
2016–2017	Shanghai Shengli	27	
2018–2019	Jiangsu Suning	25	(11)
2020–	Shanghai Shengli	15	(8)
2021–2022	→ Tottenham Hotspur (loan)	10	(0)
2022–2023	→ Madrid CFF (loan)	5	(0)
2023–2024	→ FC Levante Las Planas (loan)	11	(1)

International career^{‡}
2011–2012	China U-17	6	(1)
2013–2014	China U-20	5	(1)
2014–	China	64	(13)
- * Club domestic league appearances and goals as of 04:14, 29 October 2024 (UTC) ‡ National team caps and goals as of 04:14, 29 October 2024 (UTC)

Tang Jiali (Chinese: 唐佳丽; pinyin: Táng Jiālì; born 16 March 1995) is a Chinese professional footballer who plays for Chinese Women's Super League club Shanghai Shengli and the China national team.

She has previously played for Jiangsu Suning in the CWSL and had loan spells with Women's Super League side Tottenham Hotspur and for Liga F side Madrid CFF and Levante Las Planas.

== Club career ==
On 21 July 2021, Tang joined FA WSL side Tottenham Hotspur on loan until the end of the 2021–22 FA WSL season.

In August 2022, Tang joined Liga F club Madrid CFF on loan and returned to Shanghai Shengli in February 2023. In August 2023, she went on loan again to Liga F, this time joining FC Levante Las Planas.

== International career ==
Having played for the Chinese under-17 national team and the Chinese under-20 national team, Tang made her debut for the Chinese women's national team in a 1–1 draw against the United States on 10 December 2014 during the 2014 Torneio Internacional de Brasília.

On 28 May 2015, Tang was called up to the China squad for the 2015 FIFA Women's World Cup.

On 29 March 2018, Tang was called up to the China squad for the 2018 AFC Women's Asian Cup.

On 11 January 2022, Tang was called up to the China squad for the 2022 AFC Women's Asian Cup.

On 5 July 2023, Tang was called up to the China squad for the 2023 FIFA Women's World Cup.

On 19 February 2026, Tang was called up to the China squad for the 2026 AFC Women's Asian Cup.

== Career statistics ==
=== International ===
As of match played 26 October 2024

Appearances and goals by national team and year
National team	Year	Apps	Goals
China	2014	4	1
China	2015	14	1
China	2016	3	0
China	2017	12	1
China	2018	5	1
China	2019	5	0
China	2020	3	2
China	2021	2	0
China	2022	8	4
China	2023	5	0
China	2024	3	1
Total		64	13

Scores and results list China's goal tally first, score column indicates score after each Tang goal.

List of international goals scored by Tang Jiali
No.	Date	Venue	Opponent	Score	Result	Competition
1	14 December 2014	Estádio Nacional Mané Garrincha, Brasília, Brazil	Argentina	2–0	6–0	2014 International Women's Football Tournament of Brasília
2	13 January 2015	Shenzhen Stadium, Foshan, China	South Korea	2–0	2–3	2015 Four Nations Tournament
3	24 January 2017	Century Lotus Stadium, Foshan, China	Ukraine	3–0	5–0	2017 Four Nations Tournament
4	12 April 2018	Amman International Stadium, Amman, Jordan	Jordan	8–1	8–1	2018 AFC Women's Asian Cup
5	7 February 2020	Campbelltown Stadium, Sydney, Australia	Thailand	4–0	6–1	2020 AFC Women's Olympic Qualifying Tournament
6	7 February 2020	Campbelltown Stadium, Sydney, Australia	Thailand	5–0	6–1	2020 AFC Women's Olympic Qualifying Tournament
7	10 February 2020	Campbelltown Stadium, Sydney, Australia	Chinese Taipei	1–0	5–0	2020 AFC Women's Olympic Qualifying Tournament
8	13 February 2020	Bankwest Stadium, Sydney, Australia	Australia	1–0	1–1	2020 AFC Women's Olympic Qualifying Tournament
9	23 January 2022	Mumbai Football Arena, Mumbai, India	Iran	6–0	7–0	2022 AFC Women's Asian Cup
10	23 January 2022	Mumbai Football Arena, Mumbai, India	Iran	7–0	7–0	2022 AFC Women's Asian Cup
11	30 January 2022	DY Patil Stadium, Navi Mumbai, India	Vietnam	3–1	3–1	2022 AFC Women's Asian Cup
12	6 February 2022	DY Patil Stadium, Navi Mumbai, India	South Korea	1–2	3–2	2022 AFC Women's Asian Cup
13	26 October 2024	Yongchuan Sports Center, Chongqing, China	Uzbekistan	3–0	3–0	2024 Yongchuan International Tournament
