= Gao Chen =

Chinese footballer

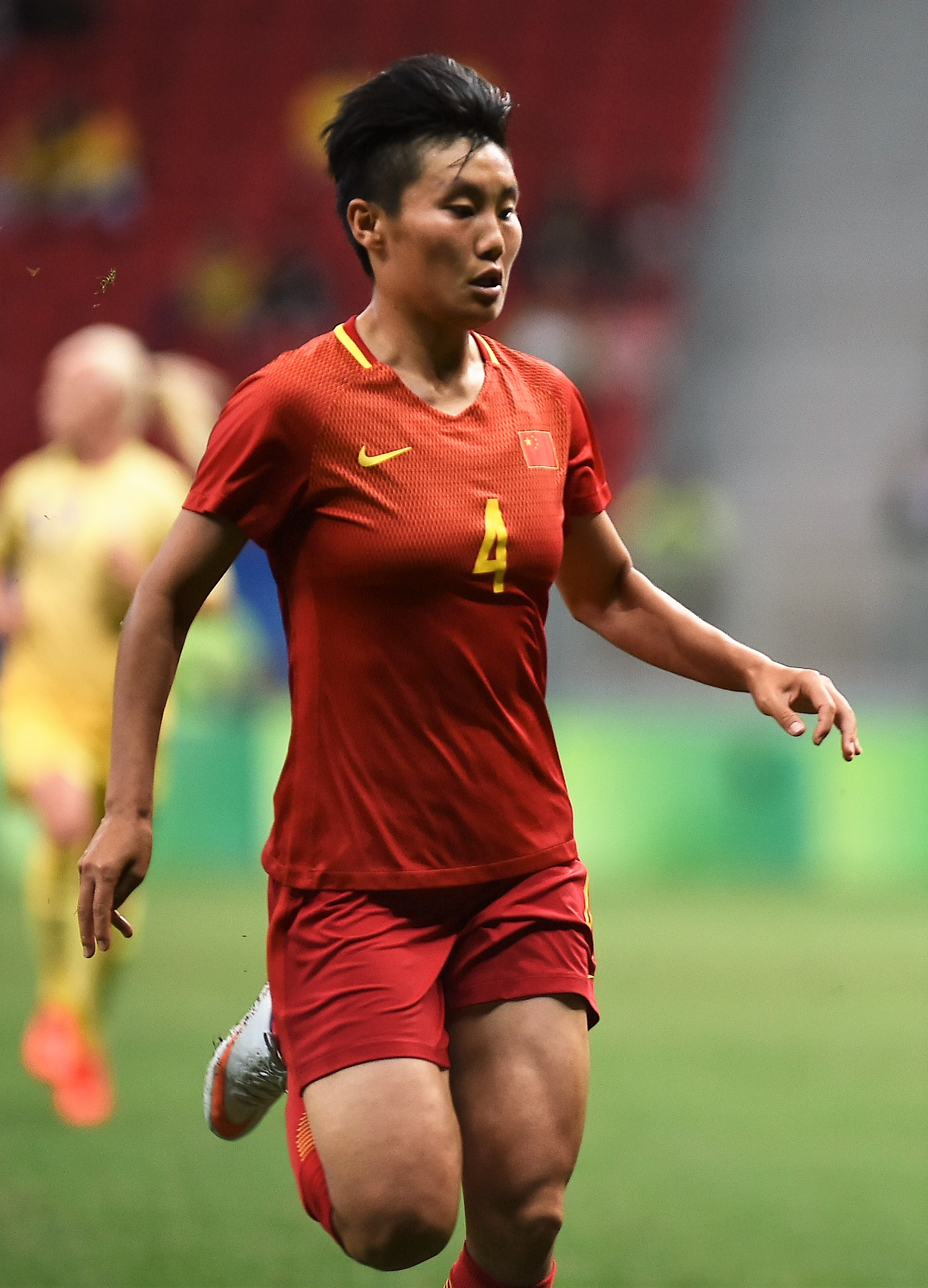
- Gao Chen at the 2016 Olympics

Personal information
- Full name: Gao Chen
- Date of birth: August 11, 1992 (age 34)
- Place of birth: Dalian, China
- Height: 1.70 m (5 ft 7 in)
- Position: Defender

Team information
- Current team: Changchun Zhuoyue

Senior career*
Years	Team	Apps	(Gls)
?	Dalian	0	(0)
?	Changchun Zhouyue	10	(0)

International career^{‡}
2016-	China	22	(0)
- * Club domestic league appearances and goals ‡ National team caps and goals as of 6 February 2022

Gao Chen (Chinese: 高晨; pinyin: Gāo Chén; born August 11, 1992) is a Chinese footballer. She represented China in the football competition at the 2016 Summer Olympics. She also plays for Changchun Zhuoyue in the Chinese Women's Super League.

She is a product of Beijing Normal University. Gao was part of the Chinese team who won the AFC 2023 Asian Cup.

In 2021, while playing for Changchun, she was the assists leader in the CWSL. Her performance allowed her to be called to the national team after a 4 year absence.
