= Zhu Yu (footballer) =

Chinese footballer

Zhu Yu 朱钰
Personal information
- Date of birth: 23 July 1997 (age 29)
- Place of birth: Benxi, China
- Height: 1.84 m (6 ft 0 in)
- Position: Goalkeeper

Team information
- Current team: Wuhan Jianghan University
- Number: 12

International career
Years	Team	Apps	(Gls)
	China	11	(0)

Zhu Yu (Chinese: 朱钰; pinyin: Zhū Yù) is a Chinese professional football player who plays as a goalkeeper for Wuhan Jianghan University. She studied in Jianghan University.

== Honours ==
China

- AFC Women's Asian Cup: 2022
