= Yao Wei (footballer) =

Chinese footballer (born 1997)

Personal information
- Date of birth: 1 September 1997 (age 29)
- Place of birth: Fuyang, China
- Height: 1.68 m (5 ft 6 in)
- Position: Midfielder

Team information
- Current team: Wuhan Jianghan University
- Number: 10

Senior career*
Years	Team	Apps	(Gls)
2020–	Wuhan Jianghan University	27	(1)

International career^{‡}
2014	China U17	3	(0)
2017–	China	18	(3)
- * Club domestic league appearances and goals as of 25 June 2019 ‡ National team caps and goals as of 25 June 2019

Yao Wei (Chinese: 姚伟; pinyin: Yáo Wěi; born 1 September 1997) is a Chinese footballer currently playing as a midfielder for Wuhan Jianghan University.

== Personal life ==
Yao is the twin sister of fellow footballer Yao Daogang.

== Career statistics ==
=== International ===
As of matches played 7 June 2019.

National team	Year	Apps	Goals
China	2017	1	0
China	2018	2	0
China	2019	5	0
Total		8	0

== International goals ==
No.	Date	Venue	Opponent	Score	Result	Competition
1.	1 December 2018	Guam Football Association National Training Center, Dededo, Guam	Mongolia	10–0	10–0	2019 EAFF E-1 Football Championship
2.	3 December 2018	Guam Football Association National Training Center, Dededo, Guam	Hong Kong	1–0	6–0	2019 EAFF E-1 Football Championship
3.	6 October 2023	Yellow Dragon Sports Centre, Hangzhou, China	Uzbekistan	7–0	7–0	2022 Asian Games
4.	9 July 2025	Suwon World Cup Stadium, Suwon, South Korea	South Korea	1–0	2–2	2025 EAFF E-1 Football Championship

== Honours ==
Wuhan Jiangda

- AFC Women's Champions League: 2024–25
