= Wang Yanwen (footballer) =

Chinese footballer

Personal information
- Date of birth: 27 March 1999 (age 27)
- Place of birth: Liaoning, China
- Height: 1.67 m (5 ft 6 in)
- Position: Forward

Senior career*
Years	Team	Apps	(Gls)
2018–2024	Beijing	69	(13)
2022	→ Shanghai Shengli (loan)	4	(1)
2024–2026	Dijon FCO	24	(2)

International career^{‡}
2017–2019	China U20	4	(0)
2021–	China	23	(4)
- * Club domestic league appearances and goals as of 02:12, 23 October 2025 (UTC) ‡ National team caps and goals as of 02:12, 23 October 2025 (UTC)

Wang Yanwen (Chinese: 王妍雯; pinyin: Wáng yánwén) (born 27 March 1999) is a Chinese footballer who plays as a forward for the China national team. She studied in the Beijing Sport University.

== Career statistics ==
=== Club ===
As of match played 18 October 2025

Appearances and goals by club, season and competition
Club	Season	League			National cup (Note: Includes Coupe de France)		Total	
Club	Season	Division	Apps	Goals	Apps	Goals	Apps	Goals
Beijing	2018	CWSL	9	2	?	?	9	2
Beijing	2019	CWSL	13	1	?	?	13	1
Beijing	2020	CWSL	13	3	?	?	13	3
Beijing	2021	CWSL	14	2	?	?	14	2
Beijing	2023	CWSL	9	3	2	0	11	3
Beijing	2024	CWSL	11	4	3	0	14	4
Beijing	Total		69	13	5	0	74	13
Shanghai Shengli (loan)	2022	CWSL	4	1	2	0	6	1
Dijon FCO	2024–25	Première Ligue	19	1	2	0	21	1
Dijon FCO	2025–26	Première Ligue	5	1	0	0	5	1
Dijon FCO	Total		24	2	2	0	26	2
Career total			97	16	9	0	106	16

=== International ===
As of match played 16 July 2025

Appearances and goals by national team and year
National team	Year	Apps	Goals
China	2021	1	1
China	2022	3	0
China	2023	5	0
China	2024	5	1
China	2025	9	2
Total		23	4

Scores and results list China's goal tally first, score column indicates score after each Wang goal.

List of international goals scored by Wang Yanwen
No.	Date	Venue	Opponent	Score	Result	Competition
1	27 July 2021	Yokohama International Stadium, Yokohama, Japan	Netherlands	2–5	2–8	2020 Summer Olympics
2	26 October 2024	Yongchuan Sports Center, Chongqing, China	Uzbekistan	1–0	3–0	2024 Yongchuan International Tournament
3	5 April 2025	Yongchuan Sports Center, Chongqing, China	Uzbekistan	5–0	5–0	2025 Yongchuan International Tournament
4	13 July 2025	Hwaseong Stadium, Hwaseong, South Korea	Chinese Taipei	3–2	4–2	2025 EAFF E-1 Football Championship
5	14 September 2026	Gifu Nagaragawa Stadium, Gifu, Japan	Hong Kong	3–1	5–1	2026 Asian Games
6	21 September 2026	Gifu Nagaragawa Stadium, Gifu, Japan	Philippines	1–0	5–1	2026 Asian Games
7	21 September 2026	Gifu Nagaragawa Stadium, Gifu, Japan	Philippines	2–0	5–1	2026 Asian Games
8	21 September 2026	Gifu Nagaragawa Stadium, Gifu, Japan	Philippines	4–0	5–1	2026 Asian Games
