= Trần Thị Thu Thảo =

Vietnamese footballer

Personal information
- Date of birth: 15 January 1993 (age 33)
- Place of birth: Ho Chi Minh City, Vietnam
- Height: 1.58 m (5 ft 2 in)
- Position: Midfielder

Team information
- Current team: Hồ Chí Minh City I
- Number: 16

Senior career*
Years	Team	Apps	(Gls)
2007–	Hồ Chí Minh City I	142	(28)

International career^{‡}
2011–2013	Vietnam U19	5	(0)
2014–	Vietnam	50	(3)
- * Club domestic league appearances and goals ‡ National team caps and goals as of 29 September 2021.

Trần Thị Thu Thảo (born 15 January 1993) is a Vietnamese footballer who plays as a midfielder for V-Women's League club Hồ Chí Minh City I and the Vietnam women's national team.

== Club career ==
Trần Thị Thu Thảo has played for Hồ Chí Minh City in Vietnam.

== International career ==
Trần Thị Thu Thảo capped for Vietnam at senior level during the 2020 AFC Women's Olympic Qualifying Tournament.

Alongside her twin sister Phương Thảo, Thu Thảo was called up for the 2022 AFC Women's Asian Cup, in which Vietnam gained their historical qualification to the 2023 FIFA Women's World Cup.

== International goals ==
No.	Date	Venue	Opponent	Score	Result	Competition
1.	9 August 2025	Lạch Tray Stadium, Hải Phòng, Vietnam	Indonesia	5–0	7–0	2025 ASEAN Women's Championship
2.	12 August 2025	Lạch Tray Stadium, Hải Phòng, Vietnam	Thailand	1–0	1–0	2025 ASEAN Women's Championship
