= Yao Lingwei =

Chinese footballer (born 1995)

Personal information
- Date of birth: 5 December 1995 (age 30)
- Place of birth: Xuzhou, China
- Height: 1.68 m (5 ft 6 in)
- Position: Midfielder

Team information
- Current team: Wuhan Jianghan University

Senior career*
Years	Team	Apps	(Gls)
- Wuhan Jianghan University

International career
2019–	China	16	(0)
- * Club domestic league appearances and goals

Yao Lingwei (Chinese: 姚凌薇; pinyin: Yáo Líng Wēi; born 5 December 1995) is a Chinese footballer who plays as a midfielder. She was a member of the China squad for 2022 AFC Women's Asian Cup.

Yao studied at Jiangsu University School of Teacher's Education.

== Honours ==
China

- AFC Women's Asian Cup: 2022

== See also ==
- Football in China
