= Shim Seo-yeon =

South Korean footballer

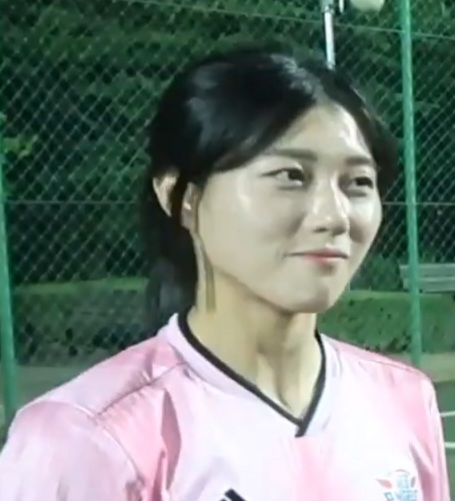

Personal information
- Date of birth: 15 April 1989 (age 37)
- Place of birth: Icheon, South Korea
- Height: 1.70 m (5 ft 7 in)
- Position: Defender

Youth career
- Yeojoo Institute of Technology

Senior career*
Years	Team	Apps	(Gls)
2010–2011	Suwon FMC		
2012–2017	Icheon Daekyo		
2017–2020	Hyundai Steel Red Angels		
2021	Sejong Sportstoto		
2022	Seoul City WFC		
2023–2024	Suwon FC		

International career
2005	South Korea U17	3	(0)
2007	South Korea U20	5	(0)
2008–2024	South Korea	92	(1)
Medal record
Summer Universiade
Gold medal – first place	2009 Belgrade	Team
Asian Games
Bronze medal – third place	2010 Guangzhou	Team
Bronze medal – third place	2014 Incheon	Team
- * Club domestic league appearances and goals

Shim Seo-yeon (Korean: 심서연, Korean pronunciation: [ɕim.sʌ.jʌn]; born 15 April 1989) is a retired South Korean footballer who played as a defender.

== Club career ==
In November 2017, Shim signed with Incheon Hyundai Steel Red Angels and was given the number 14 shirt. On 23 April 2018, she made her debut in a 0–0 draw with Gyeongju KHNP.

== Honours ==
=== Club ===
Suwon FC

- WK League: 2010, 2024

=== International ===
- Summer Universiade Gold medal: 2009
- Asian Games Bronze medal: 2010, 2014
- Peace Queen Cup: 2010
