= Zhang Xin (footballer) =

Chinese footballer (born 1992)

Personal information
- Date of birth: 23 May 1992 (age 34)
- Place of birth: Nantong, China
- Height: 1.71 m (5 ft 7 in)
- Position: Midfielder

Team information
- Current team: Shanghai Shengli
	Shanghai Shengli	?	(?)

International career
Years	Team	Apps	(Gls)
	China	47	(9)

Zhang Xin (Chinese: 张馨; pinyin: Zhāng Xīn; born 23 May 1992) is a Chinese professional footballer who plays as a midfielder for Shanghai Shengli. She studied in Tongji University.

== International career ==
As of match played 8 April 2025

Appearances and goals by national team and year
National team	Year	Apps	Goals
China	2012	1	0
China	2013	1	0
China	2014	5	0
China	2019	4	0
China	2020	3	1
China	2021	5	1
China	2022	8	1
China	2023	9	2
China	2024	3	1
China	2025	8	3
Total		47	9

=== International goals ===
No.	Date	Venue	Opponent	Score	Result	Competition
1.	7 February 2020	Campbelltown Stadium, Sydney, Australia	Thailand	2–0	6–1	2020 AFC Women's Olympic Qualifying Tournament
2.	8 April 2021	Goyang Stadium, Goyang, South Korea	South Korea	1–0	2–1	2020 AFC Women's Olympic Qualifying Tournament
3.	20 January 2022	Mumbai Football Arena, Mumbai, India	Chinese Taipei	3–0	4–0	2022 AFC Women's Asian Cup
4.	22 September 2023	Linping Sports Center Stadium, Hangzhou, China	Mongolia	13–0	16–0	2022 Asian Games
5.	22 September 2023	Linping Sports Center Stadium, Hangzhou, China	Mongolia	16–0	16–0	2022 Asian Games
6.	29 October 2024	Yongchuan Sports Center, Chongqing, China	Vietnam	1–0	2–0	2024 Yongchuan International Tournament
7.	22 February 2025	Pinatar Arena, San Pedro del Pinatar, Spain	Chinese Taipei	4–0	4–0	2025 Pinatar Cup
8.	5 April 2025	Yongchuan Sports Center, Chongqing, China	Uzbekistan	1–0	5–0	2025 Yongchuan International Tournament
9.	8 April 2025	Yongchuan Sports Center, Chongqing, China	Thailand	2–0	5–1	2025 Yongchuan International Tournament
