= China at the 2022 Asian Games =

- IOC code: CHN
- NOC: Chinese Olympic Committee external link (in Chinese and English)

in Hangzhou, China 23 September 2023 – 8 October 2023
- Competitors: 886 (449 men and 437 women)
- Flag bearers (opening): Yang Liwei (basketball); Qin Haiyang (Swimming)
- Flag bearer (closing): Xie Zhenye
- Medals Ranked 1st: Gold 201 Silver 111 Bronze 71 Total 383

Asian Games appearances (overview)
- 1974; 1978; 1982; 1986; 1990; 1994; 1998; 2002; 2006; 2010; 2014; 2018; 2022; 2026

The People's Republic of China competed at the 2022 Asian Games as the host country, as the games were held in Hangzhou, capital of the Zhejiang province.

Earlier the event was scheduled to be held in September 2022 but due to COVID-19 pandemic cases rising in China the event was postponed and rescheduled to September–October 2023.

The host nation, China crossed the 200 gold medal mark for the first time in a single edition of the Asian Games, reaching a total of 201 gold medals, becoming the first country in the history to do so and surpassing their previous record of 199 golds in the 2010 Guangzhou Asian Games.

== Medals by sport ==
Medals by sport
Sport	Gold	Silver	Bronze	Total
Archery	0	2	1	3
Artistic swimming	2	0	0	2
Athletics	19	11	9	39
Badminton	4	3	2	9
Basketball	1	0	1	2
3x3 Basketball	1	0	0	1
Boxing	5	2	2	9
Breakdancing	1	0	1	2
Canoeing Slalom	3	1	0	4
Canoeing Sprint	9	0	0	9
Cycling BMX	0	1	0	1
Cycling Track	2	6	2	10
Cycling Road	0	1	0	1
Cycling Mountain Bike	2	2	0	4
Diving	10	6	0	16
Dragon boat	5	1	0	6
Equestrian	2	1	0	3
Fencing	2	4	2	8
Field hockey	1	0	0	1
Football	0	0	1	1
Golf	0	0	1	1
Gymnastics Artistic	8	3	4	15
Gymnastics Rhythmic	0	0	1	1
Gymnastics Trampoline	2	1	0	3
Handball	0	0	1	1
Judo	1	2	3	6
Ju-jitsu	0	1	0	1
Karate	2	0	1	3
Kurash	2	0	0	2
Marathon swimming	2	1	1	4
Mind sports Bridge	1	1	1	3
Mind sports Chess	3	0	1	4
Mind sports Esports	4	0	1	5
Mind sports Go	1	2	0	3
Mind sports Xiangqi	3	2	0	5
Modern pentathlon	2	1	2	5
Roller sports Roller Skating	1	2	0	3
Roller sports Skateboarding	3	2	2	7
Rugby sevens	1	0	0	1
Rowing	11	2	0	13
Sailing	6	2	0	8
Sepak takraw	0	0	1	1
Shooting	16	9	4	29
Sport climbing	2	2	2	6
Softball	0	1	0	1
Swimming	28	21	9	58
Table tennis	6	2	1	9
Tennis	2	1	0	3
Soft Tennis	0	0	3	3
Taekwondo	5	1	2	8
Triathlon	0	2	1	3
Volleyball	1	1	0	2
Beach Volleyball	1	1	1	3
Water polo	1	1	0	2
Weightlifting	5	3	1	9
Wrestling	1	3	6	10
Wushu	11	0	0	11
Total	201	111	71	383

== Football ==
Both of China men's team and women's team were drawn in Group A at the Games.

Team	Event	Group Stage				Round of 16	Quarterfinals	Semifinals	Final / BM	
Team	Event	Opposition Score	Opposition Score	Opposition Score	Rank	Opposition Score	Opposition Score	Opposition Score	Opposition Score	Rank
China men's	Men's tournament	India; W 5–1	Myanmar; W 4–0	Bangladesh; D 0–0	1 Q	Qatar; W 1–0	South Korea; L 0–2	Did not advance		7
China women's	Women's tournament	Mongolia; W 16–0	Uzbekistan; W 6–0	—N/a	1 Q	—N/a	Thailand; W 4–0	Japan; L 3–4	Uzbekistan; W 7–0	3rd place, bronze medalist(s)

=== Men's tournament ===
Roster

The following 22 players list is the China squad for the 2022 Asian Games.

Head Coach: (Serbia) Dejan Đurđević

No.	Pos.	Player	Date of birth (age)	Club
1	GK	Han Jiaqi	3 July 1999 (aged 24)	(Chinese Football Association) Beijing Guoan
2	DF	Liu Yang*	17 June 1995 (aged 28)	(Chinese Football Association) Shandong Taishan
3	DF	Jiang Shenglong	24 December 2000 (aged 22)	(Chinese Football Association) Shanghai Shenhua
4	DF	Yeljan Shinar	9 June 1999 (aged 24)	(Chinese Football Association) Nantong Zhiyun
5	DF	Zhu Chenjie	23 August 2000 (aged 23)	(Chinese Football Association) Shanghai Shenhua
6	MF	Ablahan Haliq	26 April 2001 (aged 22)	(Chinese Football Association) Shanghai Port
7	FW	Tao Qianglong	20 November 2001 (aged 21)	(Chinese Football Association) Wuhan Three Towns
8	MF	Dai Wai Tsun	25 July 1999 (aged 24)	(Chinese Football Association) Shanghai Shenhua
9	FW	Zhang Wei	16 May 2000 (aged 23)	(Chinese Football Association) Shanghai Shenhua
10	FW	Tan Long*	1 April 1988 (aged 35)	(Chinese Football Association) Changchun Yatai
11	MF	Xu Haoyang	15 January 1999 (aged 24)	(Chinese Football Association) Shanghai Shenhua
12	GK	Huang Zihao	9 June 2001 (aged 22)	(Chinese Football Association) Nanjing City
13	DF	He Yupeng	5 December 1999 (aged 23)	(Chinese Football Association) Dalian Pro
14	MF	Wang Haijian	2 August 2000 (aged 23)	(Chinese Football Association) Shanghai Shenhua
15	MF	Gao Tianyi*	1 July 1998 (aged 25)	(Chinese Football Association) Beijing Guoan
16	FW	Wang Zhenao	10 August 1999 (aged 24)	(Chinese Football Association) Dalian Pro
17	MF	Huang Jiahui	7 October 2000 (aged 22)	(Chinese Football Association) Dalian Pro
18	MF	Li Yongjia	24 July 2001 (aged 22)	(Chinese Football Association) Meizhou Hakka
19	DF	Sun Qinhan	21 March 2000 (aged 23)	(Chinese Football Association) Cangzhou Mighty Lions
20	FW	Fang Hao	3 January 2000 (aged 23)	(Chinese Football Association) Beijing Guoan
21	FW	Liu Ruofan	28 January 1999 (aged 24)	(Chinese Football Association) Shanghai Shenhua
22	GK	Peng Peng	24 November 2000 (aged 22)	(Chinese Football Association) Henan

* Over-aged player.

Group A

Pos	Team	Pld	W	D	L	GF	GA	GD	Pts	Qualification
1	China (H)	3	2	1	0	9	1	+8	7	Knockout stage
2	India	3	1	1	1	3	6	−3	4	Knockout stage
3	Myanmar	3	1	1	1	2	5	−3	4	Knockout stage
4	Bangladesh	3	0	1	2	0	2	−2	1	

Source: Football – Men – Groups
Rules for classification: Group stage tiebreakers
(H) Hosts
19 September 2023
19:30

China	5–1	India
Gao Tianyi 17'; Dai Wai Tsun 51'; Tao Qianglong 72', 75'; Fang Hao 90+2'	Report	Rahul K.P. 45'

Huanglong Sports Centre Stadium, Hangzhou
Attendance: 34,513
Referee: Thoriq Alkatiri (Indonesia)

21 September 2023
19:30

Myanmar	0–4	China
	Report	Tan Long 15', 19'; Wang Zhen'ao 22'; Dai Wai Tsun 44'

Huanglong Sports Centre Stadium, Hangzhou
Attendance: 36,888
Referee: Ammar Mahfoodh (Bahrain)

24 September 2023
19:30

China	0–0	Bangladesh
	Report

Huanglong Sports Centre Stadium, Hangzhou
Attendance: 36,918
Referee: Mongkolchai Pechsri (Thailand)

Round of 16

27 September 2023
19:30 UTC+8

China	1–0	Qatar
Tao Qianglong 3'	Report

Huanglong Sports Centre Stadium, Hangzhou
Attendance: 38,027
Referee: Rustam Lutfullin (Uzbekistan)

Quarterfinal

1 October 2023
20:00 UTC+8

China	0–2	South Korea
	Report	Hong Hyun-seok 18'; Song Min-kyu 35'

Huanglong Sports Centre Stadium, Hangzhou
Attendance: 38,158
Referee: Qasim Al-Hatmi (Oman)

=== Women's tournament ===
Roster

The following 22 players list was the China squad for the 2022 Asian Games.

Head Coach: Shui Qingxia

No.	Pos.	Player	Date of birth (age)	Caps	Goals	Club
1	GK	Zhu Yu	23 July 1997 (aged 26)	11	0	(Chinese Football Association) Shanghai Shengli
12	GK	Xu Huan	6 March 1999 (aged 24)	5	0	(Chinese Football Association) Jiangsu
22	GK	Pan Hongyan	30 December 2004 (aged 18)	0	0	(Chinese Football Association) Beijing
8	DF	Yao Wei	1 September 1997 (aged 26)	33	3	(Chinese Football Association) Wuhan Jianghan University
4	DF	Wang Linlin	4 August 2000 (aged 23)	10	1	(Chinese Football Association) Shanghai Shengli
3	DF	Dou Jiaxing	29 February 2000 (aged 23)	3	0	(Chinese Football Association) Jiangsu
15	DF	Chen Qiaozhu	8 September 1999 (aged 24)	6	0	(Chinese Football Association) Meizhou Huijun
2	DF	Li Mengwen	28 March 1995 (aged 28)	19	0	(The Football Association) Brighton & Hove Albion
2	DF	Liu Yanqiu	31 December 1995 (aged 27)			
10	MF	Zhang Rui (vice-captain)	17 January 1989 (aged 34)	163	24	(Chinese Football Association) Wuhan Jianghan University
16	MF	Yao Lingwei	5 December 1995 (aged 27)	17	0	(Chinese Football Association) Wuhan Jianghan University
6	MF	Zhang Xin	23 May 1992 (aged 31)	33	3	(Chinese Football Association) Shanghai Shengli
13	MF	Yang Lina	13 April 1994 (aged 29)	31	2	(Royal Spanish Football Federation) Levante Las Planas
9	MF	Shen Mengyu	19 August 2001 (aged 22)	1	0	(Scottish Football Association) Celtic
19	MF	Zhang Linyan	16 January 2001 (aged 22)	16	2	(The Football Association) Tottenham Hotspur
19	MF	Yan Jinjin	10 September 1996 (aged 27)			
7	FW	Wang Shuang	23 January 1995 (aged 28)	118	39	(United States Soccer Federation) Racing Louisville
14	FW	Lou Jiahui	26 May 1991 (aged 32)	113	5	(Chinese Football Association) Wuhan Jianghan University
21	FW	Gu Yasha	28 November 1990 (aged 32)	122	13	(Chinese Football Association) Wuhan Jianghan University
21	FW	Ou Yiyao	13 March 2001 (aged 22)			
11	FW	Wang Shanshan (captain)	27 January 1990 (aged 33)	154	58	(Chinese Football Association) Wuhan Jianghan University
21	FW	Wurigumula	26 August 1996 (aged 27)			

Group A

Pos	Team	Pld	W	D	L	GF	GA	GD	Pts	Qualification
1	China (H)	2	2	0	0	22	0	+22	6	Knockout stage
2	Uzbekistan	2	1	0	1	6	6	0	3	Knockout stage
3	Mongolia	2	0	0	2	0	22	−22	0	
4	Iran	0	0	0	0	0	0	0	0	Withdrew

Source: Football – Women – Groups
Rules for classification: Group stage tiebreakers
(H) Hosts
22 September 2023
19:30 UTC+8

China	16–0	Mongolia
Wang Shuang 2', 19', 26', 37', 59'; Wang Shanshan 8', 31'; Liu Yanqiu 24'; Yang Lina 39'; Yan Jinjin 50', 84'; Wurigumula 57', 86'; Ou Yiyao 73'; Zhang Xin 76', 90+2'	Report

Linping Sports Center Stadium, Hangzhou
Attendance: 6,910
Referee: Mahnaz Zokaee (Iran)

28 September 2023
19:30 UTC+8

Uzbekistan	0–6	China
	Report	Wang Shanshan 33', 50'; Shen Mengyu 52'; Chen Qiaozhu 56'; Yan Jinjin 78' (pen.), 90+4'

Linping Sports Center Stadium, Hangzhou
Attendance: 7,523
Referee: Thein Thein Aye (Myanmar)

Quarterfinal

30 September 2023
20:00 UTC+8

China	4–0	Thailand
Wang Shanshan 3'; Wang Shuang 41', 51'; Yang Lina 81'	Report

Linping Sports Center Stadium, Hangzhou
Attendance: 7,932
Referee: Veronika Bernatskaia (Kyrgyzstan)

Semifinal

3 October 2023
20:00 UTC+8

China	3–4	Japan
Wang Linlin 20'; Zhang Linyan 55'; Yang Lina 61'	Report	Nakashima 12'; Tanikawa 31'; Chiba 35'; Koga 43'

Linping Sports Center Stadium, Hangzhou
Attendance: 8,006
Referee: Kim Yu-jeong (South Korea)

Final

6 October 2023
15:00 UTC+8

(bronze) China	7–0	Uzbekistan
Ou Yiyao 1'; Chen Qiaozhu 26', 62'; Wang Shanshan 45'; Wurigumula 59'; Gu Yasha 65'; Yao Wei 67'	Report

Huanglong Sports Centre Stadium, Hangzhou
Attendance: 38,029
Referee: Asaka Koizumi (Japan)

== Sport climbing ==
Speed

Athlete	Event	Qualification		Round of 16	Quarter-finals	Semi-finals	Final / BM	
Athlete	Event	Best	Rank	Opposition Time	Opposition Time	Opposition Time	Opposition Time	Rank
Long Jinbao	Men's	5.353	6 Q	M Alipour (IRI); W 5.282–5.524	Katibin (INA); W 5.052–7.407	Wu (CHN); W FS	R Alipour (IRI); L Fall–5.302	2nd place, silver medalist(s)
Wu Peng	Men's	5.151	2 Q	S Chan (HKG); W 5.240–6.223	Omasa (JPN); W 5.018–5.161	Long (CHN); L FS	Leonardo (INA); L 5.119–4.955	4
Deng Lijuan	Women's	6.730	2 Q	Islamova (UZB); W 6.947–12.627	Hayashi (JPN); W 6.737–7.779	Sallsabillah (INA); W 6.523–6.661	Dewi (INA); L 6.435–6.364	2nd place, silver medalist(s)
Niu Di	Women's	6.954	4 Q	Verma (IND); W 7.403–13.417	Disyabut (THA); W 7.696–10.725	Dewi (INA); L 6.837–6.522	Sallsabillah (INA); L Fall–6.879	4

Speed relay

Athlete	Event	Qualification		Quarter-finals	Semi-finals	Final / BM	
Athlete	Event	Time	Rank	Opposition Time	Opposition Time	Opposition Time	Rank
Long Jinbao; Wang Xinshang; Wu Peng; Zhang Liang	Men's	16.672	2 Q	Thailand (THA); W 19.144–20.923	Singapore (SGP); W 16.152–20.632	Indonesia (INA); W FS	1st place, gold medalist(s)
Deng Lijuan; Niu Di; Wang Shengqin; Zhang Shaoqin	Women's	21.877	1 Q	—N/a	Kazakhstan (KAZ); W 23.318–32.417	Indonesia (INA); W 20.925–23.506	1st place, gold medalist(s)

Combined

Athlete	Event	Qualification				Semi-finals				Final			
Athlete	Event	Boulder Point	Lead Point	Total	Rank	Boulder Point	Lead Point	Total	Rank	Boulder Point	Lead Point	Total	Rank
Huang Jinbin	Men's	79.6	48.1	127.7	7 Q	48.7	33	81.7	6 Q	39.6	8.1	47.7	6
Pan Yufei	Men's	100	92.1	192.1	3 Q	49.6	60.1	109.7	5 Q	59.6	28	87.6	3rd place, bronze medalist(s)
Luo Zhilu	Women's	99.7	76.1	175.8	3 Q	53.20	54.1	107.3	6	Cancelled (Note: The women's boulder and lead final has been cancelled due to rain and safety of the athletes. The semi-finals result would be used as final result.)			
Zhang Yuetong	Women's	59.8	51	110.8	6 Q	99.73	76	175.73	3rd place, bronze medalist(s)	Cancelled			

== Tennis ==
Men

Athlete	Event	Round of 64	Round of 32	Round of 16	Quarter-finals	Semi-finals	Final	
Athlete	Event	Opposition Score	Opposition Score	Opposition Score	Opposition Score	Opposition Score	Opposition Score	Rank
Wu Yibing	Singles	Bye	Barki (INA); W 7–5, 6–1	Wong (HKG); L 4–6, 6–3, 6–7^{(6–8)}	Did not advance			
Zhang Zhizhen	Singles	Bye	Alhogbani (KSA); W 7–5, 6–2	Fitriadi (INA); W 6–3, 6–3	Nagal (IND); W 6–7^{(3–7)}, 6–1, 6–2	Sultanov (UZB); W 6–4, 6–1	Watanuki (JPN); W 6–4, 7–9^{(9–7)}	1st place, gold medalist(s)
Te Rigele; Bu Yunchaokete	Doubles	—N/a	Hsu / Jung (TPE); L 6–2, 3–6, [7–10]	Did not advance				
Wu Yibing; Zhang Zhizhen	Doubles	—N/a	Ho / Wu (TPE); W 6–3, 6–0	Alharrasi / Naif (QAT); W 6–3, 6–4	Myneni / Ramanathan (IND); L 1–6, 6–7^{(8–10)}	Did not advance		

Women

Athlete	Event	Round of 64	Round of 32	Round of 16	Quarter-finals	Semi-finals	Final	
Athlete	Event	Opposition Score	Opposition Score	Opposition Score	Opposition Score	Opposition Score	Opposition Score	Rank
Zheng Qinwen	Singles	Bye	Chogsomjav (MGL); W 6–0, 6–0	Lee (TPE); W 6–0, 6–2	Park (KOR); W 7–6^{(7–4)}, 6–0	Eala (PHI); W 6–1, 6–7^{(5–7)}, 6–3	Zhu (CHN); W 6–2, 6–4	1st place, gold medalist(s)
Zhu Lin	Singles	Bye	Suhail (PAK); W 6–0, 6–0	Tjen (INA); W 6–3, 6–0	Han (KOR); W 7–6^{(7–3)}, 6–3	Kaji (JPN); W 4–6, 6–0, 6–1	Zheng (CHN); L 2–6, 4–6	2nd place, silver medalist(s)
Wang Xinyu; Yang Zhaoxuan	Doubles	—N/a	Bye	Back / Jeong (KOR); L 5–3^{r}	Did not advance			
Zheng Qinwen; Zhu Lin	Doubles	—N/a	Kobori / Shimizu (JPN); L 6–7^{(5–7)}, 3–6	Did not advance				

Mixed

Athlete	Event	Round of 64	Round of 32	Round of 16	Quarter-finals	Semi-finals	Final	
Athlete	Event	Opposition Score	Opposition Score	Opposition Score	Opposition Score	Opposition Score	Opposition Score	Rank
Zhu Lin; Bu Yunchaokete	Doubles	Bye	Marimova / Milushev (UZB); W 6–0, 6–0	Liang / Huang (TPE); L 3–6, 7–6^{(10–8)}, [7–10]	Did not advance			
Yang Zhaoxuan; Zhang Zhizhen	Doubles	Bye	Tukhtayeva / Isroilov (TJK); L w/o	Did not advance				

== Weightlifting ==
Men

Athlete	Event	Snatch		Clean & Jerk		Total	Rank
Athlete	Event	Result	Rank	Result	Rank	Total	Rank
Li Fabin	61 kg	143 GR	1	167	3	310 GR	1st place, gold medalist(s)
Ding Hongjie	61 kg	~~133~~	—	—	—	—	DNF
Chen Lijun	67 kg	150 GR	1	180		320 GR	1st place, gold medalist(s)
Wei Yinting	73 kg	161 GR	1	~~180~~	—	—	DNF
Tian Tao	96 kg	180	1	210	2	390	1st place, gold medalist(s)
Li Dayin	96 kg	176		206	4	382	4
Liu Huanhua	109 kg	185	2	233 GR^{[a]}	1	418 GR^{[a]}	1st place, gold medalist(s)

Women

Athlete	Event	Snatch		Clean & Jerk		Total	Rank
Athlete	Event	Result	Rank	Result	Rank	Total	Rank
Jiang Huihua	49 kg	94 GR	1	119	2	213	2nd place, silver medalist(s)
Hou Zhihui	55 kg	95	3	115	3	210	2nd place, silver medalist(s)
Luo Shifang	59 kg	107	2	133	2	240	2nd place, silver medalist(s)
Pei Xinyi	64 kg	104	2	130	2	234	2nd place, silver medalist(s)
Liao Guifang	76 kg	113	3	—	—	—	DNF
Liang Xiaomei	87 kg	120	1	155	1	275	1st place, gold medalist(s)

^{a} Liu weighed in at 100.8 kg making him eligible to compete in the 102 kg class but the Asian Games used the former Summer Olympic categories, he was forced to move up to a class in the 109's. His lifts of 233 kg in the clean & jerk and 418 kg in the total would break the world standards and set new world records but since he competed in the 109's his records would not be recorded in the 102's.

== Wushu ==
=== Taolu ===
Athlete	Event	Event 1		Event 2		Total	Rank
Athlete	Event	Result	Rank	Result	Rank	Total	Rank
Sun Peiyuan	Men's changquan	9.840	1	—N/a		9.840	1st place, gold medalist(s)
Gao Haonan	Men's taijiquan and taijijian	9.830	1	9.836	1	19.666	1st place, gold medalist(s)
Chang Zhizhao	Men's daoshu and gunshu	9.826	1	9.800	1	19.626	1st place, gold medalist(s)
Chen Huiying	Women's nanquan and nandao	9.790	1	9.800	1	19.590	1st place, gold medalist(s)
Tong Xin	Women's taijiquan and taijijian	9.843	1	9.853	1	19.696	1st place, gold medalist(s)
Lai Xiaoxiao	Women's jianshu and qiangshu	9.800	1	9.800	1	19.600	1st place, gold medalist(s)

=== Sanda ===
Athlete	Event	Round of 16	Quarter-finals	Semi-finals	Final	
Athlete	Event	Opposition Score	Opposition Score	Opposition Score	Opposition Score	Rank
Jiang Haidong	Men's –56 kg	Iminzhanov (KAZ); W 2–0	Guitara (INA); W 2–0	Hứa (VIE); W 2–0	Mandal (PHI); W PD	1st place, gold medalist(s)
Wang Xuetao	Men's –60 kg	Khaliq (PAK); W PD	Bùi (VIE); W 2–0	Kim (KOR); W 2–0	Panahi (IRI); W 2–0	1st place, gold medalist(s)
He Feng	Men's –70 kg	Nguyễn V T (VIE); W 2–0	Yuldashev (UZB); W 2–0	Hotak (AFG); W 2–0	Mohammadseifi (IRI); W 2–1	1st place, gold medalist(s)
Li Yueyao	Women's –52 kg	Bye	Nguyễn T N H (VIE); W 2–0	Cai (MAC); W PD	E Mansourian (IRI); W 2–0	1st place, gold medalist(s)
Wu Xiaowei	Women's –60 kg	—N/a	Hou (TPE); W PD	S Mansourian (IRI); W 2–0	Devi (IND); W 2–0	1st place, gold medalist(s)
