= Japan women's national football B team =

Secondary national association football team representing Japan

Japan women's B
- Association: JFA
- Confederation: AFC
- Head coach: Michihisa Kano (ja)
- Home stadium: N/A
First colours	Second colours

Japan women's B is a secondary football team as support for the Japan women's national football team.

== Results ==
Legend

Win Draw Lose

=== 2023 ===
22 September 2023 2022 Asian Games GS	Japan	8–0	Bangladesh	Wenzhou, China
19:30 UTC+8	Chiba 7', 29'; Tanikawa 8' (pen.), 80'; Shiokoshi 45'; Hijikata 49'; Sakakibara 58', 85'	Report		Stadium: Wenzhou Olympic Sports Center Stadium; Attendance: 2,744; Referee: Kim Yu-jeong (South Korea)

25 September 2023 2022 Asian Games GS	Nepal	0–8	Japan	Wenzhou, China
19:30 UTC+8		Report	Shiokoshi 3'; Yamamoto 13'; Ueno 27'; Wakisaka 30'; Osawa 36' (pen.), 75'; Sakakibara 59'; Hijikata 90+7'	Stadium: Wenzhou Olympic Sports Center Stadium; Attendance: 6,195; Referee: Pich Plong (Cambodia)

28 September 2023 2022 Asian Games GS	Japan	7–0	Vietnam	Wenzhou, China
16:00 UTC+8	Shiokoshi 19', 24'; Chiba 51', 77'; Wakisaka 55' (pen.); Osawa 69', 90+2'	Report		Stadium: Wenzhou Olympic Sports Center Stadium; Attendance: 10,174; Referee: Lara Christie Lee (Australia)

30 September 2023 2022 Asian Games QF	Japan	8–1	Philippines	Wenzhou, China
19:30 UTC+8	Tanikawa 40' (pen.); Osawa 58', 90+4'; Chiba 65'; Ueno 76' (pen.), 78', 81', 90+1'	Report	Bolden 68'	Stadium: Wenzhou Olympic Sports Center Stadium; Attendance: 33,607; Referee: Casey Reibelt (Australia)

3 October 2023 2022 Asian Games SF	China	3–4	Japan	Hangzhou, China
20:00 UTC+8	Wang Linlin 20'; Zhang Linyan 55'; Yang Lina 61'	Report	Nakashima 12'; Tanikawa 31'; Chiba 35'; Koga 43'	Stadium: Linping Sports Center Stadium; Attendance: 8,006; Referee: Kim Yu-jeong (South Korea)

6 October 2023 2022 Asian Games F	Japan	4–1	North Korea	Hangzhou, China
20:00 UTC+8	Nakashima 10'; Osawa 66'; Tanikawa 69'; Chiba 72'	Report	Kim Kyong-yong 38'	Stadium: Huanglong Sports Centre Stadium; Attendance: 37,166; Referee: Veronika Bernatskaia (Kyrgyzstan)

== Team ==
=== 2022 Asian Games squad ===
The following players were called up for the 2022 Asian Games.

Head Coach: Michihisa Kano (狩野 倫久)

No.	Pos.	Player	Date of birth (age)	Caps	Goals	Club
1	GK	Natsumi Asano (浅野 菜摘)	14 April 1997 (age 28)	0	0	(Japan) Chifure AS Elfen Saitama
12	GK	Shu Ohba (大場 朱羽)	11 July 2002 (age 22)	0	0	(United States) Ole Miss Rebels
18	GK	Mamiko Matsumoto (松本 真未子)	9 October 1997 (age 27)	0	0	(Japan) MyNavi Sendai
2	DF	Shinomi Koyama (小山 史乃観)	31 January 2005 (age 20)	1	0	(Sweden) Djurgårdens IF
3	DF	Haruna Tabata (田畑 晴菜)	27 May 2002 (age 23)	0	0	(Japan) MyNavi Sendai
4	DF	Wakaba Goto (後藤 若葉)	4 June 2001 (age 24)	0	0	(Japan) Waseda University
6	DF	Rio Sasaki (佐々木 里緒)	17 September 2004 (age 20)	0	0	(Japan) MyNavi Sendai
17	DF	Toko Koga (古賀 塔子)	6 January 2006 (age 19)	0	0	(Netherlands) Feyenoord
5	MF	Reina Wakisaka (脇阪 麗奈)	2 May 1999 (age 26)	0	0	(Japan) Cerezo Osaka Yanmar
8	MF	Chihiro Ishida (石田 千尋)	20 December 2001 (age 23)	0	0	(Japan) Albirex Niigata
10	MF	Yuzuho Shiokoshi (塩越 柚歩) (captain)	1 November 1997 (age 27)	5	2	(Japan) Urawa Red Diamonds
11	MF	Yoshino Nakashima (中嶋 淑乃)	27 July 1999 (age 25)	1	0	(Japan) Sanfrecce Hiroshima Regina
14	MF	Momoko Tanikawa (谷川 萌々子)	7 May 2005 (age 20)	0	0	(Sweden) Rosengård
16	MF	Suzu Amano (天野 紗)	18 February 2004 (age 21)	0	0	(Japan) INAC Kobe Leonessa
21	MF	Kotono Sakakibara (榊原 琴乃)	11 October 2004 (age 20)	0	0	(Japan) Nojima Stella Sagamihara
7	FW	Yuzuki Yamamoto (山本 柚月)	1 September 2002 (age 22)	0	0	(Japan) Tokyo Verdy Beleza
9	FW	Mami Ueno (上野 真実)	27 September 1996 (age 28)	10	1	(Japan) Sanfrecce Hiroshima Regina
13	FW	Mei Shimada (島田 芽依)	8 May 2002 (age 23)	0	0	(Japan) Urawa Red Diamonds
15	FW	Remina Chiba (千葉 玲海菜)	30 April 1999 (age 26)	5	2	(Germany) Eintracht Frankfurt
19	FW	Maya Hijikata (土方 麻耶)	13 April 2004 (age 21)	0	0	(Japan) Tokyo Verdy Beleza
20	FW	Haruka Osawa (大澤 春花)	15 April 2001 (age 24)	0	0	(Japan) JEF United Chiba

== See also ==
- Japan Football Association (JFA)
- Japan women's national football team
- Japan women's national under-23 football team
- Japan women's national under-20 football team
- Japan women's national under-17 football team
