= 2021 Chinese Women's Football Championship =

Tournament details
- Country: China
- Dates: 25 March–7 April 2021
- Teams: 17

Final positions
- Champions: Changchun Dazhong Zhuoyue
- Runners-up: Shanghai Shengli

Tournament statistics
- Matches played: 45
- Goals scored: 149 (3.31 per match)
- Top goal scorer(s): Li Wen; Li Ying (8 goals each)

Awards
- Best player: Li Wen
- Best goalkeeper: Zhao Lina

The 2021 Chinese Women's Football Championship (Chinese: 2021年中国女子足球锦标赛) was the 30th edition of the Chinese Women's Football Championship. It was held from 25 March to 7 April 2021 at Haigeng Football Base in Kunming.

== First round ==
=== Group A ===
Pos	Team	Pld	W	D	L	GF	GA	GD	Pts	Qualification
1	Changchun Dazhong Zhuoyue	2	2	0	0	6	0	+6	6	Qualification to the Quarter-finals
2	Shaanxi	2	1	0	1	2	3	−1	3	Qualification to the 9th–16th-place play-offs
3	Henan Jianye	2	0	0	2	1	6	−5	0	Qualification to the 9th–16th-place play-offs

Rules for classification: 1) Points; 2) Head-to-head points; 3) Head-to-head goal difference; 4) Head-to-head goals scored.

25 March 2021	Henan Jianye	1–2	Shaanxi	Haigeng Football Base Field 2, Kunming
10:00	Zeng Qingqing 78'	CFA Report (Desktop view); CFA Report (Mobile view)	Zhao Meijia 2'; Yan Yingying 90'

27 March 2021	Changchun Dazhong Zhuoyue	2–0	Shaanxi	Haigeng Football Base Field 12, Kunming
16:00	Li Wen 8', 19'	CFA Report (Desktop view); CFA Report (Mobile view)

29 March 2021	Changchun Dazhong Zhuoyue	4–0	Henan Jianye	Haigeng Football Base Field 5, Kunming
10:00	Li Wen 63'; Wang Xinxin 76'; Chen Yuanmeng 80'; Gao Chen 90+2'

=== Group B ===
Pos	Team	Pld	W	D	L	GF	GA	GD	Pts	Qualification
1	Beijing BG Phoenix	2	1	0	1	5	2	+3	3	Qualification to the Quarter-finals
2	Zhejiang	2	1	0	1	2	2	0	3	Qualification to the Quarter-finals
3	Shanghai Donghua	2	1	0	1	1	4	−3	3	Qualification to the 9th–16th-place play-offs

Rules for classification: 1) Points; 2) Head-to-head points; 3) Head-to-head goal difference; 4) Head-to-head goals scored.

25 March 2021	Zhejiang	0–1	Shanghai Donghua	Haigeng Football Base Field 5, Kunming
10:00		CFA Report (Desktop view); CFA Report (Mobile view)	Liu Yuyan 25'

27 March 2021	Beijing BG Phoenix	4–0	Shanghai Donghua	Haigeng Football Base Field 14, Kunming
16:00	Wang Huan 39'; Yao Mengjia 45'; Wang Chen 60'; Wang Yanwen 62'	CFA Report (Desktop view); CFA Report (Mobile view)

29 March 2021	Beijing BG Phoenix	1–2	Zhejiang	Haigeng Football Base Field 2, Kunming
10:00	Lu Yu 90+1'		Chen Lingling 5'; Fang Xi 75'

=== Group C ===
Pos	Team	Pld	W	D	L	GF	GA	GD	Pts	Qualification
1	Meizhou Hakka	3	2	1	0	10	4	+6	7	Qualification to the Quarter-finals
2	Sichuan	3	2	1	0	4	1	+3	7	Qualification to the Quarter-finals
3	Dalian Pro	3	0	1	2	7	11	−4	1	Qualification to the 9th–16th-place play-offs
4	Guangzhou	3	0	1	2	4	9	−5	1	Qualification to the 9th–16th-place play-offs

Rules for classification: 1) Points; 2) Head-to-head points; 3) Head-to-head goal difference; 4) Head-to-head goals scored.

25 March 2021	Meizhou Hakka	4–1	Guangzhou	Haigeng Football Base Field 2, Kunming
16:00	Ouyang Yinyin 7'; Liao Meixin 34', 89'; Zhao Yuxin 57'	CFA Report (Desktop view); CFA Report (Mobile view)	Luo Yiying 78'

25 March 2021	Sichuan	2–1	Dalian Pro	Haigeng Football Base Field 5, Kunming
16:00	Wan Jiayao 22'; Chen Xin 70'	CFA Report (Desktop view); CFA Report (Mobile view)	Cong Qi 86'

27 March 2021	Meizhou Hakka	6–3	Dalian Pro	Haigeng Football Base Field 16, Kunming
10:00	Chen Xiubing 20'; Xie Qiwen 28', 38', 45+2', 68'; Chen Lina 54'	CFA Report (Desktop view); CFA Report (Mobile view)	Zhang Yaning 1', 18'; Cong Qi 32'

27 March 2021	Guangzhou	0–2	Sichuan	Haigeng Football Base Field 14, Kunming
10:00		CFA Report (Desktop view); CFA Report (Mobile view)	Deng Mengye 49' (o.g.); Guo Jinhua 77' (o.g.)

29 March 2021	Meizhou Hakka	0–0	Sichuan	Haigeng Football Base Field 12, Kunming
16:00

29 March 2021	Dalian Pro	3–3	Guangzhou	Haigeng Football Base Field 2, Kunming
16:00	Hu Yue 6', 7'; Huang Dongdong 25'		Zhang Linyan 2', 9', 27'

=== Group D ===
Pos	Team	Pld	W	D	L	GF	GA	GD	Pts	Qualification
1	Shanghai Shengli	3	3	0	0	7	0	+7	9	Qualification to the Quarter-finals
2	Wuhan Jianghan University	3	2	0	1	7	4	+3	6	Qualification to the Quarter-finals
3	China U-20	3	1	0	2	2	5	−3	3	Qualification to the 9th–16th-place play-offs
4	Chongqing Lander	3	0	0	3	1	8	−7	0	

Rules for classification: 1) Points; 2) Head-to-head points; 3) Head-to-head goal difference; 4) Head-to-head goals scored.

25 March 2021	Shanghai Shengli	2–0	China U-20	Haigeng Football Base Field 14, Kunming
16:00	Yang Lina 50'; Ma Yingshuang 78'	CFA Report (Desktop view); CFA Report (Mobile view)

25 March 2021	Wuhan Jianghan University	4–1	Chongqing Lander	Haigeng Football Base Field 12, Kunming
16:00	Qin Manman 4'; Gu Yasha 54', 60'; Liu Yanqiu 68'	CFA Report (Desktop view); CFA Report (Mobile view)	Wang Xia 2'

27 March 2021	Shanghai Shengli	3–0	Chongqing Lander	Haigeng Football Base Field 2, Kunming
10:00	Yan Jinjin 37'; Liu Jieru 68'; Tang Hui 90+2'	CFA Report (Desktop view); CFA Report (Mobile view)

27 March 2021	China U-20	1–3	Wuhan Jianghan University	Haigeng Football Base Field 5, Kunming
10:00	Chen Chen 55' (o.g.)	CFA Report (Desktop view); CFA Report (Mobile view)	Lyu Yueyun 51'; Qin Manman 65'; Liu Yanqiu 76'

29 March 2021	Shanghai Shengli	2–0	Wuhan Jianghan University	Haigeng Football Base Field 5, Kunming
16:00	Yan Jinjin 13'; Zhang Jieli 23'

29 March 2021	Chongqing Lander	0–1	China U-20	Haigeng Football Base Field 14, Kunming
16:00			Ekde Ali 75'

=== Group E ===
Pos	Team	Pld	W	D	L	GF	GA	GD	Pts	Qualification
1	Shandong Sports Lottery	2	2	0	0	9	1	+8	6	Qualification to the Quarter-finals
2	Hebei	2	0	1	1	3	6	−3	1	Qualification to the 9th–16th-place play-offs
3	Tianjin Shengde	2	0	1	1	2	7	−5	1	Qualification to the 9th–16th-place play-offs

Rules for classification: 1) Points; 2) Head-to-head points; 3) Head-to-head goal difference; 4) Head-to-head goals scored.

25 March 2021	Hebei	2–2	Tianjin Shengde	Haigeng Football Base Field 16, Kunming
10:00	Liu Xinyi 3'; Wang Jie 47'	CFA Report (Desktop view); CFA Report (Mobile view)	Fan Lingying 61'; Gao Jiabao 71'

27 March 2021	Shandong Sports Lottery	5–0	Tianjin Shengde	Haigeng Football Base Field 2, Kunming
16:00	Li Ying 4', 58', 71'; Li Tingting 82'; Wang Tingting 85'	CFA Report (Desktop view); CFA Report (Mobile view)

29 March 2021	Shandong Sports Lottery	4–1	Hebei	Haigeng Football Base Field 16, Kunming
10:00	Zhang Rui 15'; Li Yanfei 30'; Li Ying 56', 63'		Geng Yiming 60'

=== Ranking of runner-up teams ===
To determine the five best runner-up teams, the following criteria were used:

1. Points (3 points for a win, 1 point for a draw, 0 points for a loss)
2. Goal difference
3. Goals scored
4. Fair play points
5. Drawing of lots

Pos	Team	Pld	W	D	L	GF	GA	GD	Pts	Qualification
1	Sichuan	2	1	1	0	2	1	+1	4	Qualification to the Quarter-finals
2	Wuhan Jianghan University	2	1	0	1	3	3	0	3	Qualification to the Quarter-finals
3	Zhejiang	2	1	0	1	2	2	0	3	Qualification to the Quarter-finals
4	Shaanxi	2	1	0	1	2	3	−1	3	Qualification to the 9th–16th-place play-offs
5	Hebei	2	0	1	1	3	6	−3	1	Qualification to the 9th–16th-place play-offs

Rules for classification: 1) Points; 2) Goal difference; 3) Goals scored; 4) Fair play points; 5) Drawing of lots.

== Final round ==
=== 1–8th classification playoffs ===
==== Quarter-finals ====
1 April 2021	Meizhou Hakka	1–0	Zhejiang	Haigeng Football Base Field 2, Kunming
16:00	Chen Xiubing 24'			Referee: Yu Hong

1 April 2021	Shandong Sports Lottery	1–4	Shanghai Shengli	Haigeng Football Base Field 12, Kunming
16:00	Li Ying 80'		Yan Jinjin 6', 57', 58'; Miu Siwen 49'	Referee: Liu Sha

1 April 2021	Beijing BG Phoenix	1–1 (3–4 p)	Sichuan	Haigeng Football Base Field 5, Kunming
16:00	Zhang Jiayun 88'		Li Yan 33'	Referee: Dai Bingyue

1 April 2021	Changchun Dazhong Zhuoyue	3–1	Wuhan Jianghan University	Haigeng Football Base Field 14, Kunming
16:00	Li Wen 23', 85'; Pang Fengyue 54'		Lyu Yueyun 58'	Referee: Liu Huan

==== 5th–8th-place play-offs ====
4 April 2021	Zhejiang	0–3	Shandong Sports Lottery	Haigeng Football Base Field, Kunming
16:00

4 April 2021	Beijing BG Phoenix	5–2	Wuhan Jianghan University	Haigeng Football Base Field, Kunming
16:00

==== Semi-finals ====
4 April 2021	Meizhou Hakka	0–2	Shanghai Shengli	Haigeng Football Base Field, Kunming
16:00

4 April 2021	Sichuan	1–5	Changchun Dazhong Zhuoyue	Haigeng Football Base Field, Kunming
16:00

==== 7th–8th-place play-offs ====
7 April 2021	Zhejiang	1–1 (5–4 p)	Wuhan Jianghan University	Haigeng Football Base Field, Kunming
15:30

==== 5th–6th-place play-offs ====
7 April 2021	Shandong Sports Lottery	2–1	Beijing BG Phoenix	Haigeng Football Base Field, Kunming
15:30

==== 3rd–4th-place play-offs ====
7 April 2021	Meizhou Hakka	2–0	Sichuan	Haigeng Football Base Field, Kunming
15:30

==== Final ====
7 April 2021	Shanghai Shengli	1–1 (1–4 p)	Changchun Dazhong Zhuoyue	Haigeng Football Base Field, Kunming
16:00

=== 9–16th classification playoffs ===
==== 9th–16th-place play-offs ====
1 April 2021	Shaanxi	1–0	Henan Jianye	Haigeng Football Base Field, Kunming
10:00	Sun Haiqi 54'

1 April 2021	Tianjin Shengde	0–0 (5–6 p)	Dalian Pro	Haigeng Football Base Field, Kunming
10:00

1 April 2021	Guangzhou	0–1	China U-20	Haigeng Football Base Field, Kunming
10:00			Shao Ziqin 89'

1 April 2021	Hebei	7–1	Shanghai Donghua	Haigeng Football Base Field, Kunming
10:00	Huang Siqi 8'; Geng Yiming 10', 20'; Wang Jie 22', 90'; Zhao Yifan 70'; Li Zixuan 82'		Bai Shuyan 73'

==== 13th–16th-place play-offs ====
4 April 2021	Henan Jianye	2–0	Tianjin Shengde	Haigeng Football Base Field, Kunming
10:00

4 April 2021	Guangzhou	5–2	Shanghai Donghua	Haigeng Football Base Field, Kunming
10:00

==== 9th–12th-place play-offs ====
4 April 2021	Shaanxi	0–1	Dalian Pro	Haigeng Football Base Field, Kunming
10:00

4 April 2021	China U-20	0–1	Hebei	Haigeng Football Base Field, Kunming
10:00

==== 15th–16th-place play-offs ====
7 April 2021	Tianjin Shengde	3–2	Shanghai Donghua	Haigeng Football Base Field, Kunming
10:00

==== 13th–14th-place play-offs ====
7 April 2021	Henan Jianye	4–2	Guangzhou	Haigeng Football Base Field, Kunming
10:00

==== 11th–12th-place play-offs ====
7 April 2021	Shaanxi	4–0	China U-20	Haigeng Football Base Field, Kunming
10:00

==== 9th–10th-place play-offs ====
7 April 2021	Dalian Pro	1–0	Hebei	Haigeng Football Base Field, Kunming
10:00
