= Sung Hyang-sim =

North Korean footballer (born 1999)

Personal information
- Date of birth: 2 December 1999 (age 26)
- Place of birth: Anju City, North Korea
- Height: 1.53 m (5 ft 0 in)
- Position: Forward

Team information
- Current team: Pyongyang City Sports Club
- Number: 2

International career
Years	Team	Apps	(Gls)
2017–	North Korea	24	(10)
Korean name
Hangul	승향심
RR	Seung Hyangsim
MR	Sŭng Hyangsim
IPA	[sɯŋ çaŋɕim]

Sung Hyang-sim (Korean: 승향심; born 2 December 1999) is a North Korean footballer from Anju, South Pyongan Province. She plays for Pyongyang City Sports Club and the North Korea women's national football team as a forward.

At the 2017 AFC U-19 Women's Championship, Sung was named the tournament's Most Valuable Player and won the Golden Boot as the competition's top scorer. The same year, she was nominated for the Asian Footballer of the Year and Asian Young Footballer of the Year awards by the Asian Football Confederation (AFC), winning the latter. The previous year, she earned the Silver Ball at the 2016 FIFA U-17 Women's World Cup.

== Career ==
Sung started playing football at the age of 12 at a state junior sports school. In 2013, she played for North Korea at the 2013 AFC Under-14 Girls' Regional Championship East Region and received the tournament's Most Valuable Player award. She later competed in the 2013 AFC U-16 Women's Championship and the 2014 FIFA U-17 Women's World Cup.

In 2016, she was part of North Korea's 2016 FIFA U-17 Women's World Cup squad, where she won the Silver Ball for her performances. Later that year, she was included in North Korea's 2016 FIFA U-20 Women's World Cup squad and appeared as a substitute in the final against France. Sung chose to wear the number 2 shirt.

In 2017, Sung made her senior debut for the North Korea women's national football team against China, scoring after coming on as a substitute. The same year, she was nominated by the AFC for the Asian Footballer of the Year and Asian Young Footballer of the Year awards, eventually winning the latter. This followed her six-goal performance at the 2017 AFC U-19 Women's Championship, where she finished as the tournament's top scorer and was named Most Valuable Player.

== International goals ==
=== Under-16 ===
No.	Date	Venue	Opponent	Score	Result	Competition
1.	30 September 2013	Jiangsu Football Training Centre Stadium, Nanjing, China	Chinese Taipei	5–0	10–0	2013 AFC U-16 Women's Championship
2.	30 September 2013	Jiangsu Football Training Centre Stadium, Nanjing, China	Chinese Taipei	6–0	10–0	2013 AFC U-16 Women's Championship
3.	30 September 2013	Jiangsu Football Training Centre Stadium, Nanjing, China	Chinese Taipei	10–0	10–0	2013 AFC U-16 Women's Championship
4.	6 October 2013	Jiangning Sports Center, Nanjing, China	Japan	1–1	1–1 (a.e.t.) (5–6 p)	2013 AFC U-16 Women's Championship
5.	18 March 2014	Estadio Edgardo Baltodano Briceño, Liberia, Costa Rica	Canada	1–0	1–1	2014 FIFA U-17 Women's World Cup
6.	22 March 2024	Estadio Alejandro Morera Soto, Alajuela, Costa Rica	Germany	2–3	4–3	2014 FIFA U-17 Women's World Cup
7.	5 November 2015	Hankou Cultural Sports Centre, Wuhan, China	Chinese Taipei	2–0	5–0	2015 AFC U-16 Women's Championship
8.	5 November 2015	Hankou Cultural Sports Centre, Wuhan, China	Chinese Taipei	3–0	5–0	2015 AFC U-16 Women's Championship
9.	9 November 2015	Xinhua Road Sports Center, Wuhan, China	Japan	1–0	1–1	2015 AFC U-16 Women's Championship
10.	1 October 2016	King Abdullah Stadium, Amman, Jordan	England	1–1	3–3	2016 FIFA U-17 Women's World Cup

=== Under-19 ===
No.	Date	Venue	Opponent	Score	Result	Competition
1.	15 October 2017	Jiangning Sports Center, Nanjing, China	Thailand	1–0	9–0	2017 AFC U-19 Women's Championship
2.	15 October 2017	Jiangning Sports Center, Nanjing, China	Thailand	4–0	9–0	2017 AFC U-19 Women's Championship
3.	15 October 2017	Jiangning Sports Center, Nanjing, China	Thailand	6–0	9–0	2017 AFC U-19 Women's Championship
4.	15 October 2017	Jiangning Sports Center, Nanjing, China	Thailand	8–0	9–0	2017 AFC U-19 Women's Championship
5.	25 October 2017	Jiangning Sports Center, Nanjing, China	Australia	2–0	3–0	2017 AFC U-19 Women's Championship
6.	25 October 2017	Jiangning Sports Center, Nanjing, China	Australia	3–0	3–0	2017 AFC U-19 Women's Championship

=== National team ===
No.	Date	Venue	Opponent	Score	Result	Competition
1.	3 April 2017	Kim Il-sung Stadium, Pyongyang, North Korea	India	8–0	8–0	2018 AFC Women's Asian Cup qualification
2.	7 April 2017	Kim Il-sung Stadium, Pyongyang, North Korea	South Korea	1–0	1–1	2018 AFC Women's Asian Cup qualification
3.	9 April 2017	Kim Il-sung Stadium, Pyongyang, North Korea	Uzbekistan	2–0	4–0	2018 AFC Women's Asian Cup qualification
4.	9 April 2017	Kim Il-sung Stadium, Pyongyang, North Korea	Uzbekistan	3–0	4–0	2018 AFC Women's Asian Cup qualification
5.	8 June 2017	Fitness Centre Of Qiannan Stadium, Duyun, China	China	1–0	1–0	Friendly
6.	17 August 2018	Bumi Sriwijaya Stadium, Palembang, Indonesia	Tajikistan	1–0	16–0	2018 Asian Games
7.	17 August 2018	Bumi Sriwijaya Stadium, Palembang, Indonesia	Tajikistan	2–0	16–0	2018 Asian Games
8.	17 August 2018	Bumi Sriwijaya Stadium, Palembang, Indonesia	Tajikistan	5–0	16–0	2018 Asian Games
9.	17 August 2018	Bumi Sriwijaya Stadium, Palembang, Indonesia	Tajikistan	7–0	16–0	2018 Asian Games
10.	27 September 2023	Wenzhou Sports Centre Stadium, Wenzhou, China	Singapore	7–0	7–0	2022 Asian Games
11.	26 October 2023	Xiamen Egret Stadium, Xiamen, China	China	1–0	2–1	2024 AFC Women's Olympic Qualifying Tournament
12.	1 November 2023	Xiamen Egret Stadium, Xiamen, China	Thailand	2–0	7–0	2024 AFC Women's Olympic Qualifying Tournament
13.	30 November 2023	Suoka Sports Training Base Pitch 2, Zhuhai, China	Hong Kong	1–0	11–0	2024 EAFF E-1 Football Championship
14.	30 November 2023	Suoka Sports Training Base Pitch 2, Zhuhai, China	Hong Kong	3–0	11–0	2024 EAFF E-1 Football Championship
15.	4 December 2023	Suoka Sports Training Base Pitch 2, Zhuhai, China	Northern Mariana Islands	16–0	17–0	2024 EAFF E-1 Football Championship
