= Ju Hyo-sim =

North Korean footballer

Personal information
- Date of birth: 21 June 1998 (age 28)
- Place of birth: Hamhung, North Korea
- Position: Midfielder

International career^{‡}
Years	Team	Apps	(Gls)
2014	North Korea U17	3	(1)
2016	North Korea U20		
2015–	North Korea	2	(0)
- ‡ National team caps and goals as of 7 March 2016

- Ju Hyo-sim
- Hangul: 주효심
- RR: Ju Hyosim
- MR: Chu Hyosim

Ju Hyo-sim (Korean pronunciation: [tsu.ɦjo.ɕim]; born 21 June 1998) is a North Korean female international football player who plays for the North Korea women's national football team.

== International goals ==
=== Under-16 ===
No.	Date	Venue	Opponent	Score	Result	Competition
1.	3 October 2013	Jiangning Sports Center, Nanjing, China	China	1–0	3–1	2013 AFC U-16 Women's Championship

=== Under-19 ===
No.	Date	Venue	Opponent	Score	Result	Competition
1.	15 October 2017	Jiangning Sports Center, Nanjing, China	Thailand	5–0	9–0	2017 AFC U-19 Women's Championship
2.	18 October 2017	Jiangning Sports Center, Nanjing, China	Uzbekistan	1–0	2–0	2017 AFC U-19 Women's Championship

=== National team ===
No.	Date	Venue	Opponent	Score	Result	Competition
1.	4 March 2016	Nagai Stadium, Osaka, Japan	Vietnam	1–0	1–0	2016 AFC Women's Olympic Qualifying Tournament
2.	27 February 2019	Pyla Stadium, Pyla, Cyprus	Czech Republic	1–0	4–2	2019 Cyprus Women's Cup
3.	6 March 2019	GSZ Stadium, Larnaca, Cyprus	Italy	2–1	3–3 (a.e.t.) (7–6 p)	2019 Cyprus Women's Cup
4.	27 September 2023	Wenzhou Sports Centre Stadium, Wenzhou, China	Singapore	4–0	7–0	2022 Asian Games
5.	1 November 2023	Xiamen Egret Stadium, Xiamen, China	Thailand	7–0	7–0	2024 AFC Women's Olympic Qualifying Tournament
6.	2 December 2023	Suoka Sports Training Base Pitch 2, Zhuhai, China	Mongolia	9–0	19–0	2024 EAFF E-1 Football Championship

== Honours ==
North Korea

Winner

- EAFF Women's East Asian Cup: 2015
