= Shū Ohba =

Japanese footballer (born 2002)

Shū Ohba 大場 朱羽
Personal information
- Date of birth: 11 July 2002 (age 24)
- Place of birth: Fujisawa, Kanagawa, Japan
- Height: 1.71 m (5 ft 7 in)
- Position: Goalkeeper

Team information
- Current team: Rangers
- Number: 18

Youth career
- JFA Academy Fukushima

College career
| Years | Team | Apps | (Gls) |
| 2021–2022 | East Tennessee State Buccaneers | 26 | (0) |
| 2023–2024 | Ole Miss Rebels | 30 | (0) |

Senior career*
| Years | Team | Apps | (Gls) |
| 2025–2026 | Nippon TV Tokyo Verdy Beleza | 8 | (0) |
| 2026– | Rangers | 0 | (0) |

International career^{‡}
| 2022 | Japan U-20 | 4 | (0) |
| 2023– | Japan | 4 | (0) |
- * Club domestic league appearances and goals as of 6:00, 11 December 2024 (UTC) ‡ National team caps and goals as of 6:00, 11 December 2024 (UTC)

Shū Ohba (大場 朱羽, Shū Ohba; born 11 July 2002) is a Japanese footballer who plays as a goalkeeper for Scottish Women's Premier League side Rangers and the Japan national team.

== Early life ==
Ohba was born on 11 July 2022 in Fujisawa, Kanagawa, Japan. She started playing football when she was eight years old. She attended Fukushima Prefectural Futaba Future Senior High School. During her youth career, she played for JFA Academy Fukushima.

== Collegiate career ==
=== East Tennessee State, 2021-22 ===
During her freshman year at East Tennessee State University, Ohba played in 16 games and amassed 74 saves and 7 shutouts while conceding 14 goals. This performance earned her Southern Conference Freshman of the Year honors, as well as a spot on the All-Conference first team. She was also the Conference's Defensive Player of the Week three times.

During her sophomore year, Ohba was named Southern Conference Women's Soccer Player of the Year, once again making the All-Conference first team squad. Ohba amassed 60 saves in her 10 games played, with 3 shutouts while allowing 11 goals.

=== Ole Miss, 2023-24 ===
After the 2022 season, Ohba transferred to the University of Mississippi. During her junior year, Ohba amassed second-team All-Southeastern Conference honors, as well as a third-team United Soccer Coaches All-Southeast region honors, and was a three-time Conference Player of the Week. Ohba amassed 67 saves in 15 games played, with 7 shutouts while conceding 13 goals. She led the league in saves per game.

Her senior year saw her play in 15 games, recording 79 saves while allowing 34 goals.

== Professional career ==
=== Nippon TV Tokyo Verdy Beleza, 2025–26 ===
Ohba's signing to Japanese WE League side Nippon TV Tokyo Verdy Beleza was announced on 5 September 2025.

=== Rangers, 2026– ===
In July 2026, Ohba joined SWPL team Rangers on a one-year contract.

== International career ==
Ohba has represented Japan as early as the under-16 level, where she was a part of Japan's third-pace winning team in the 2017 AFC U-16 Women's Championship, qualifying for a spot in the 2018 FIFA U-17 Women's World Cup, which she also made the final roster for. She once again represented her country at the 2019 AFC U-19 Women's Championship, which Japan would win. During the 2022 FIFA U-20 Women's World Cup, she started in goal in 4 matches, including all 3 knockout matches, in Japan's second-place effort.

Her first roster appearance for the national team was during the 2022 Asian Games. She was also rostered for the 2024 SheBelieves Cup. She earned her first international minutes in a friendly against New Zealand on 31 May 2024. She was later named as an alternate for the 2024 Summer Olympics.
