= Chun Ga-ram =

South Korean footballer (born 2002)

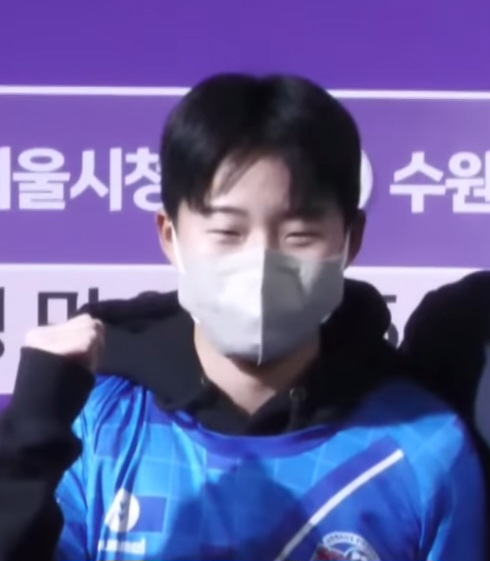

Personal information
- Date of birth: 19 October 2002 (age 24)
- Place of birth: Gimcheon, South Korea
- Height: 1.57 m (5 ft 2 in)
- Position: Forward

Team information
- Current team: Incheon Hyundai
- Number: 30

College career
Years	Team	Apps	(Gls)
2021-2022	Ulsan College		

Senior career*
Years	Team	Apps	(Gls)
2023-2025	Hwacheon KSPO	18	(0)
2026-	Incheon Hyundai		

International career^{‡}
2015-2016	South Korea U-14	11	(8)
2016-2018	South Korea U-17	10	(6)
2019-2022	South Korea U-20	6	(0)
2022-	South Korea	18	(4)
- * Club domestic league appearances and goals ‡ National team caps and goals as of 05:11, 13 April 2026 (UTC)

Chun Ga-ram (Korean: 천가람; born October 19, 2002) is a South Korean footballer who plays as a forward for Incheon Hyundai Steel Red Angels and the South Korea women's national team. She was selected for the South Korean squad at the 2023 FIFA Women's World Cup.

== Club career ==
Chun was the first player selected at the 2023 WK League new players draft, signing a three-year contract with Hwacheon KSPO. In her first season at the club, she became a core squad player and helped KSPO finish in second place in the league, at the time their best ever finish. Her performance at club level, as well as in her 11 international appearances in 2023, led to her being voted the Korea Football Association Women's Player of the Year. Despite expressing frustration at not being able to score a goal in her debut season, Chun also received the Best New Player accolade at the annual WK League Awards.

Chun transferred to Incheon Hyundai Steel Red Angels ahead of the 2026 WK League season.

== International career ==
Chun represented South Korea at several youth levels, being selected for the 2017 AFC U-16 Women's Championship and the 2018 FIFA U-17 Women's World Cup alongside teammates who were ahead of her by a year in age, and in the academy system.

She played at the 2022 FIFA U-20 Women's World Cup.

Chun received her first senior call-up for South Korea in 2022 while still at college. She made her full international debut in November 2022 and played at the 2023 FIFA Women's World Cup. She also appeared at the 2022 Asian Games, held in 2023. She scored her first international goal at the tournament, in a match against the Philippines. Chun was heralded as one of the future stars of the South Korean national team as she became a fixture of the squad under then-manager Colin Bell.

== Style of play ==
Chun plays primarily as a left winger or attacking midfielder. From a young age, she gained a reputation for her speed and goalscoring ability despite her small physique.

After the 2022 U-20 World Cup, former U.S.A. head coach Jill Ellis named Chun as one of the most impressive players of the tournament, describing her as "incredibly skilful". The technical ability she displayed at the tournament earned her the nickname 'Chun Messi' in the Korean media.

== Career statistics ==
=== International ===
List of international goals scored by Chun Ga-ram
No.	Date	Venue	Opponent	Score	Result	Competition	Ref.
1.	25 September 2023	Wenzhou Sports Centre, Wenzhou, China	Philippines	1–1	5–1	2022 Asian Games	
2.	26 October 2023	Xiamen Erget Stadium, Xiamen, China	Thailand	2–0	10–1	2024 AFC Women's Olympic Qualifying Tournament	
3.	26 October 2023	Xiamen Erget Stadium, Xiamen, China	Thailand	4–0	10–1	2024 AFC Women's Olympic Qualifying Tournament	
4.	26 October 2023	Xiamen Erget Stadium, Xiamen, China	Thailand	10–0	10–1	2024 AFC Women's Olympic Qualifying Tournament	

== Honours ==
=== Hwacheon KSPO ===
- WK League champions: 2025

=== Individual ===
- Korea Football Association Young Women's Player of the Year: 2022
- Korea Football Association Women's Player of the Year: 2023
- WK League Best New Player: 2023
