= Haruna Tabata =

Japanese footballer (born 2002)

Personal information
- Date of birth: 27 May 2002 (age 24)
- Place of birth: Osaka, Osaka Prefecture, Japan
- Height: 1.64 m (5 ft 5 in)
- Positions: Midfielder; defender; forward

Team information
- Current team: AIK
- Number: 5

Youth career
- Viento Toyono
- JFA Academy Sakai
- Cerezo Osaka

Senior career*
Years	Team	Apps	(Gls)
2018–2022	Cerezo Osaka	72	(6)
2023–2024	Mynavi Sendai	25	(0)
2024–	AIK	56	(8)

International career^{‡}
2018	Japan U16		
2021	Japan U20		
2022	Japan U20	6	(1)
2023–	Japan	6	(0)
- * Club domestic league appearances and goals as of 9 October 2026 ‡ National team caps and goals as of 9 October 2026

Haruna Tabata (田畑晴菜, Tabata Haruna; pronounced [ta.ba.ta ha.ɾɯ.na]; 27 May 2002) is a Japanese professional footballer who plays as a wide midfielder for Damallsvenskan club AIK Stockholm and the Japan national team.

Originally a centre-back, after graduating from their academy she began her career at Nadeshiko League 1 club Cerezo Osaka. She later moved to WE League club Mynavi Sendai, before securing her first overseas move to the Damallsvenskan where she signed for AIK. She also represented Japan at under-16, under-19 and under-20 level before becoming part of the senior team.

== Early life ==
Tabata was born on 27 May 2002 in Osaka, Osaka Prefecture, Japan.

Tabata attended Osaka Gakugei Senior & Junior High School (OGSJH), a junior and senior high school in Sumiyoshi Ward. She later attended Osaka Seikei University, where she studied cooking and confectionery.

== Club career ==
=== Cerezo Osaka ===
After graduating from the club's academy, Tabata was brought into the first team of Nadeshiko League 1 club Cerezo Osaka in the 2018 season. She originally played as a centre-back.

In the 2021 season, Tabata was integrated as part of the starting front three following the departure of Maika Hamano, shifting into a more attacking role.

Following the conclusion of the 2022 season, Tabata departed the club.

=== Mynavi Vegalta Sendai ===
During the 2022–23 season, Tabata signed for WE League club Mynavi Sendai. On 17 December 2023, she scored her first goal for the club, scoring the winning goal in a 2–1 home victory over Ehime FC at Kanseki Stadium Tochigi in Utsunomiya, Tochigi Prefecture in the fifth round of the Empress' Cup.

At the end of the 2024–25 season, Tabata left the club to pursue an opportunity overseas.

=== AIK Stockholm ===
Tabata signed for Damallsvenskan club AIK Stockholm during the 2024 season. She made her début on 24 August 2024, playing the entirety of a 3–2 loss to Vittsjö GIK at home at Skytteholms IP in Solna, Stockholm, Stockholm County. On 22 September 2024, she scored her first goal for the club in a 2–2 draw with IF Brommapojkarna at home. On 23 November 2024, she scored the winning goal in the second leg of the promotion/relegation playoff against Umeå IK, with the goal deciding a 2–0 victory at home that saw AIK avoid relegation to the Elitettan with a 2–1 aggregate win. She finished the year with three goals in 12 appearances across all competitions.

Ahead of the 2025 season, Tabata extended her contract until the end of the 2026 season, with her contract set to expire on 31 December 2026. She finished the year with three goals and five assists in 28 appearances across all competitions.

As a result of her contract extension, Tabata remained at the club for the 2026 season. On 19 September 2026, Tabata scored the opening goal in AIK's 2–1 victory at home over cross-city rivals Hammarby IF. The match was regarded as a crucial one due to Hammarby's competition with BK Häcken in the title race and AIK's competition with Malmö FF in the race for a spot in the UEFA Women's Champions League (UWCL) third qualifying round.

== International career ==
Tabata has represented Japan at under-16, under-19, under-20 and senior level.

=== Japan U20 ===
Tabata was selected for the Japan under-20 national team by manager Futoshi Ikeda as part of Japan's 21-player squad for the 2022 FIFA U-20 Women's World Cup in Costa Rica, held from 10 to 28 August 2022. She started in every match. Japan, who were the defending champions, finished runners-up at the tournament.

=== Japan ===
Tabata was selected for the Japan senior national team by manager Michihisa Kanō as part of a 21-player squad (in practice acting as a B-team squad) for the 2022 Asian Games in China. She played in all six games at the tournament. Japan won the tournament by defeating North Korea 4–1 in the gold medal match, winning their third title. However, during the match, she suffered an orbital blowout fracture in her right eye socket, leaving her out injured for five weeks.

== Career statistics ==
=== Club ===
As of 10 October 2026

Appearances and goals by club, season and competition
Club	Season	League			Domestic cup			League cup			Other		Total	
Club	Season	Division	Apps	Goals	Cup	Apps	Goals	Cup	Apps	Goals	Apps	Goals	Apps	Goals
Cerezo Osaka	2018	Nadeshiko League 1	5	0	Empress' Cup	1	0	Nadeshiko League Cup	4	0	—N/a		11	0
Cerezo Osaka	2019	Nadeshiko League 2	10	0	Empress' Cup	2	0	Nadeshiko League Cup	9	0	—N/a		21	0
Cerezo Osaka	2020	Nadeshiko League 1	17	0	Empress' Cup	3	0	—N/a			—N/a		20	0
Cerezo Osaka	2021	Nadeshiko League 1	22	5	Empress' Cup	4	2	—N/a			—N/a		26	7
Cerezo Osaka	2022	Nadeshiko League 1	18	1	Empress' Cup	3	2	—N/a			—N/a		21	3
Cerezo Osaka	Total		72	6	Total	13	4	Total	13	0	—N/a		98	10
Mynavi Sendai	2022–23	WE League	8	0	Empress' Cup	0	0	—N/a			—N/a		8	0
Mynavi Sendai	2023–24	WE League	17	0	Empress' Cup	2	1	WE League Cup	3	0	—N/a		22	1
Mynavi Sendai	Total		25	0	Total	2	1	Total	3	0	—N/a		30	1
AIK Stockholm	2024	Damallsvenskan	11	2	Svenska Cupen	4	1	—N/a			2 (Note: Statistics for the Damallsvenskan promotion/relegation playoffs.)	1	14	4
AIK Stockholm	2025	Damallsvenskan	24	3	Svenska Cupen	3	0	—N/a			—N/a		27	3
AIK Stockholm	2026	Damallsvenskan	19	2	Svenska Cupen	1	0	—N/a			—N/a		20	2
AIK Stockholm	Total		54	7	Total	8	1	—N/a			2	1	61	9
Career total			151	13	Total	23	6	Total	16	0	2	1	192	22

=== International ===
Appearances and goals by national team and year
National team	Year	Apps	Goals
Japan U20	2022	6	1
Japan	2023	6	0
Career total		12	1

== Honours ==
Japan U20

- FIFA U-20 Women's World Cup

Runners-up: 2022

Japan

- Asian Games

Champions: 2022
