= Umida Zoirova =

Uzbekistani footballer (born 1998)

Personal information
- Full name: Umida Mahmudjon qizi Zoirova
- Date of birth: 22 April 1998 (age 28)
- Place of birth: Toshkent, Uzbekistan
- Position: Midfielder

Team information
- Current team: Bunyodkor

Senior career*
Years	Team	Apps	(Gls)
- Bunyodkor

International career^{‡}
2012	Uzbekistan U16	1+	(1)
2016–2017	Uzbekistan U19	6	(0)
2017–	Uzbekistan	7	(1)
- * Club domestic league appearances and goals ‡ National team caps and goals as of 9 April 2019

Umida Zoirova (born 22 April 1998) is an Uzbekistani footballer who plays as a midfielder for Women's Championship club Bunyodkor and the Uzbekistan women's national team.

== International goals ==
Scores and results list Uzbekistan's goal tally first.

No.	Date	Venue	Opponent	Score	Result	Competition
1.	7 April 2017	Kim Il-sung Stadium, Pyongyang, North Korea	India	4–0	7–1	2018 AFC Women's Asian Cup qualification
2.	8 September 2019	Karakol Central Stadium, Karakol, Kyrgyzstan	Tajikistan	1–0	12–0	Friendly
3.	8 September 2019	Karakol Central Stadium, Karakol, Kyrgyzstan	Tajikistan	12–0	12–0	Friendly
4.	8 April 2023	Milliy Stadium, Tashkent, Uzbekistan	Timor-Leste	2–0	3–0	2024 AFC Women's Olympic Qualifying Tournament
5.	11 April 2023	Milliy Stadium, Tashkent, Uzbekistan	Jordan	1–0	7–0	2024 AFC Women's Olympic Qualifying Tournament
6.	30 September 2023	Linping Sports Center Stadium, Hangzhou, China	Chinese Taipei	2–1	2–1 (a.e.t.)	2022 Asian Games
7.	2 July 2025	Milliy Stadium, Tashkent, Uzbekistan	Laos	2–0	7–0	2026 AFC Women's Asian Cup qualification

== See also ==
- List of Uzbekistan women's international footballers
