= Trần Thị Duyên =

Vietnamese footballer

Personal information
- Date of birth: 28 December 2000 (age 25)
- Place of birth: Bình Lục, Hà Nam, Vietnam
- Height: 1.60 m (5 ft 3 in)
- Position: Defender

Team information
- Current team: Phong Phú Hà Nam
- Number: 5

Senior career*
Years	Team	Apps	(Gls)
2016–	Phong Phú Hà Nam	24	(7)

International career^{‡}
2017–2020	Vietnam U20	2	(0)
2018–	Vietnam	7	(1)
- * Club domestic league appearances and goals ‡ National team caps and goals as of 10 tháng 2 năm 2022

Trần Thị Duyên (born 28 December 2000) is a Vietnamese women's footballer who plays as a defender for Phong Phú Hà Nam football club and the Vietnam women's national football team.

== International goals ==
No.	Date	Venue	Opponent	Score	Result	Competition
1.	25 September 2023	Wenzhou Olympic Sports Center Stadium, Wenzhou, China	Bangladesh	3–0	6–1	2022 Asian Games
