= 2024 AFC Women's Olympic Qualifying Tournament =

Tournament details
- Host countries: First round: Uzbekistan (Group A); Myanmar (Group B); Nepal (Group C); Thailand (Group D); Tajikistan (Group E); Lebanon (Group F); Kyrgyzstan (Group G); Second round: Australia (Group A); China (Group B); Uzbekistan (Group C)
- Dates: First round: 1–11 April 2023; Second round: 26 October – 1 November 2023; Third round: 24 & 28 February 2024
- Teams: 31 (from 1 confederation)

Tournament statistics
- Matches played: 46
- Goals scored: 183 (3.98 per match)
- Attendance: 290,760 (6,321 per match)
- Top scorer(s): (Uzbekistan) Diyorakhon Khabibullaeva (9 goals)
- All statistics correct as of 28 February 2024.

The 2024 AFC Women's Olympic Qualifying Tournament was the sixth edition of the AFC Women's Olympic Qualifying Tournament, the quadrennial international football competition organised by the Asian Football Confederation (AFC) to determine which women's national teams from Asia qualify for the Olympic football tournament.

The top two teams of the tournament qualified for the 2024 Summer Olympics women's football tournament in France as AFC representatives.

== Format ==
Of the 47 AFC member associations, a total of 31 AFC member national teams entered the qualifying stage. The format was as follows:

- First round: The five highest-ranked teams in the FIFA Women's World Rankings as of 9 December 2022, which were North Korea, Japan, Australia, China PR and South Korea, received byes to the second round. The remaining 26 teams were divided into five groups of four and two groups of three and compete in a one-round league format in a centralised venue. The winners of each group in this round then advanced to the second round.
- Second round: The twelve teams (five teams who entered this round and seven teams from the first round) will be drawn into three groups of four teams and compete in a one-round league format in a centralised venue. The three group winners and the best-ranked runners-up in this round will then advance to the third round.
- Third round: The four teams will play two pairs of home and away matches with the two eventual winners qualifying for the Women’s Olympic Football Tournament.

== Teams ==
The draw for the first round was held on 12 January 2023, 15:00 MYT, at the AFC House in Kuala Lumpur, Malaysia. Five teams received a bye to the second round.

Teams entering second round
1. North Korea (10)
2. **Japan** (11)
3. **Australia** (12)
4. China (14)
5. South Korea (15)

Teams entering first round
Pot 1	Pot 2	Pot 3	Pot 4
6. Vietnam (34); 7. Chinese Taipei (39); 8. Thailand (41) **(H)***; 9. Myanmar (48) **(H)***; 10. Uzbekistan (49) **(H)***; 11. Philippines (53); 12. India (61)	13. Iran (68); 14. Jordan (69); 15. Hong Kong (77); 16. Indonesia (97); 17. Nepal (103) **(H)***; 18. Kyrgyzstan (124) **(H)***; 19. Mongolia (129)	20. Palestine (130) **(W)**; 21. Singapore (134); 22. Turkmenistan (137) **(W)**; 23. Bangladesh (140) **(W)**; 24. Lebanon (142) **(H)***; 25. Tajikistan (144) **(H)***; 26. Timor-Leste (153)	27. Sri Lanka (155) **(W)**; 28. Maldives (159) **(W)**; 29. Pakistan (160); 30. Bhutan (177); 31. Afghanistan (NR) **(W)**

Notes

- Teams in **bold** qualified for the Olympics.
- Numbers in parentheses indicate the December 2022 FIFA Women's World Rankings (otherwise unranked).
- (H): Qualification first round group hosts (* all chosen as group hosts after the draw, the remaining group hosted at a neutral venue)
- (N): Not a member of the International Olympic Committee, ineligible for Olympics
- (W): Withdrew after draw

Did not enter

- Laos (85)
- Bahrain (86)
- Malaysia (89)
- Guam (94)
- United Arab Emirates (114)
- Cambodia (120)
- Syria (157)
- Brunei
- Iraq
- Kuwait
- Macau **(N)**
- Northern Mariana Islands **(N)**
- Oman
- Qatar
- Saudi Arabia
- Yemen

== First round ==
The first round was played between 1–11 April 2023.

Tiebreakers

Teams are ranked according to points (3 points for a win, 1 point for a draw, 0 points for a loss), and if tied on points, the following tiebreaking criteria are applied, in the order given, to determine the rankings (Regulations article 13.2):

1. Goal difference in all group matches;
2. Goals scored in all group matches;
3. Points in head-to-head matches among tied teams;
4. Goal difference in head-to-head matches among tied teams;
5. Goals scored in head-to-head matches among tied teams;
6. Disciplinary points (yellow card = −1 point, red card as a result of two yellow cards = −3 points, direct red card = −4 points, yellow card followed by direct red card = −5 points);
7. Drawing of lots.

=== Group A ===
- All matches were held in Uzbekistan.
- Times listed are UTC+5.

Pos	Team	Pld	W	D	L	GF	GA	GD	Pts	Qualification
1	Uzbekistan (H)	3	3	0	0	19	0	+19	9	Second round
2	Bhutan	3	2	0	1	5	11	−6	6	
3	Jordan	3	1	0	2	4	10	−6	3	
4	Timor-Leste	3	0	0	3	2	9	−7	0	

Source: AFC
Rules for classification: Qualification tiebreakers
(H) Hosts
5 April 2023
15:00

Jordan	3–1	Timor-Leste
Al-Majali 45+3' (pen.); Jbarah 61'; Abu-Sabbah 82'	Report	Nilda 90+5'

Pakhtakor Stadium, Tashkent
Attendance: 10
Referee: Plong Pich Akara (Cambodia)
5 April 2023
17:00

Uzbekistan	9–0	Bhutan
Khabibullaeva 2', 20', 45+1', 48', 73'; Karachik 30' (pen.), 42'; Norboeva 51'; Shoyimova 90+1'	Report

Milliy Stadium, Tashkent
Attendance: 145
Referee: Azusa Sugino (Japan)

8 April 2023
15:00

Bhutan	2–1	Jordan
N. Dema 64'; Rai 76'	Report	Jbarah 90+2' (pen.)

Pakhtakor Stadium, Tashkent
Attendance: 66
Referee: Mahsa Ghorbani (Iran)
8 April 2023
17:00

Timor-Leste	0–3	Uzbekistan
	Report	Nabiqulova 59'; Zoirova 70'; Shoyimova 79'

Milliy Stadium, Tashkent
Attendance: 117
Referee: Supiree Testhomya (Thailand)

11 April 2023
15:00

Timor-Leste	1–3	Bhutan
Godelivia 90+5'	Report	N. Dema 43', 67'; J. Choden 75'

Pakhtakor Stadium, Tashkent
Attendance: 10
Referee: Wang Chieh (Chinese Taipei)
11 April 2023
17:00

Uzbekistan	7–0	Jordan
Zoirova 9'; Ablyakimova 18'; Khabibullaeva 44', 49', 63'; Kudratova 56', 58'	Report

Milliy Stadium, Tashkent
Attendance: 0
Referee: Azusa Sugino (Japan)

=== Group B ===
- All matches were held in Myanmar.
- Times listed are UTC+6:30.

Pos	Team	Pld	W	D	L	GF	GA	GD	Pts	Qualification
1	Iran	2	1	1	0	2	1	+1	4	Second round
2	Myanmar (H)	2	0	1	1	1	2	−1	1	
3	Bangladesh	0	0	0	0	0	0	0	0	Withdrew
4	Maldives	0	0	0	0	0	0	0	0	Withdrew

Source: AFC
Rules for classification: Qualification tiebreakers
(H) Hosts
5 April 2023
16:00

Iran	1–0	Myanmar
Chatrenoor 52'	Report

Thuwunna Stadium, Yangon
Attendance: 880
Referee: Yang Shu-Ting (Chinese Taipei)

8 April 2023
16:00

Myanmar	1–1	Iran
Win Theingi Tun 57'	Report	Zandi 14'

Thuwunna Stadium, Yangon
Attendance: 1,150
Referee: Lara Lee (Australia)

=== Group C ===
- All matches were held in Nepal.
- Times listed are UTC+5:45.

Pos	Team	Pld	W	D	L	GF	GA	GD	Pts	Qualification
1	Vietnam	2	2	0	0	7	1	+6	6	Second round
2	Nepal (H)	2	0	0	2	1	7	−6	0	
3	Afghanistan (Note: Afghanistan was withdrawn by the AFC. The Afghanistan Football Federation (AFF) released a statement that it would not permit players outside the country to represent them or intend to organize a women's national team contradicting a February 2023 social media post. The Afghanistan team was originally disbanded following the 2021 Taliban takeover of Afghanistan.)	0	0	0	0	0	0	0	0	Withdrew
4	Palestine	0	0	0	0	0	0	0	0	Withdrew

Source: AFC
Rules for classification: Qualification tiebreakers
(H) Hosts
Notes:
5 April 2023
18:00

Nepal	1–5	Vietnam
Bhandari 79'	Report	Phạm Hải Yến 11'; Huỳnh Như 36' (pen.), 48'; Nguyễn Thị Bích Thùy 38'; Nguyễn Thị Thanh Nhã 90+1'

Dasarath Stadium, Kathmandu
Attendance: 2,750
Referee: Sunita Thongthawin (Thailand)

8 April 2023
18:00

Vietnam	2–0	Nepal
Phạm Hải Yến 6', 7'	Report

Dasarath Stadium, Kathmandu
Attendance: 1,925
Referee: Oh Hyeon-jeong (South Korea)

=== Group D ===
- All matches were held in Thailand.
- Times listed are UTC+7:00.

Pos	Team	Pld	W	D	L	GF	GA	GD	Pts	Qualification
1	Thailand (H)	2	2	0	0	12	0	+12	6	Second round
2	Singapore	2	0	1	1	2	8	−6	1	
3	Mongolia	2	0	1	1	2	8	−6	1	
4	Sri Lanka	0	0	0	0	0	0	0	0	Suspended (Note: On 22 January 2023, FIFA announced the suspension of the Football Federation of Sri Lanka (FFSL) from 21 January 2023 until further notice.)

Source: AFC
Rules for classification: Qualification tiebreakers
(H) Hosts
Notes:
1 April 2023
17:00

Singapore	0–6	Thailand
	Report	Orapin 8'; Pluemjai 21'; Saowalak 58', 77'; Jiraporn 65'; Panittha 87'

Chonburi Stadium, Chonburi
Attendance: 500
Referee: Thein Thein Aye (Myanmar)

4 April 2023
17:00

Mongolia	2–2	Singapore
Namuunaa 3', 90+4'	Report	Danelle Tan 42'; Izzati 79'

Chonburi Stadium, Chonburi
Attendance: 50
Referee: Nodira Mirzoeva (Tajikistan)

7 April 2023
17:00

Thailand	6–0	Mongolia
Nutwadee 11'; Pattaranan 16'; Ploychompoo 27'; Orawan 50'; Jiraporn 69' (pen.), 90+1'	Report

Chonburi Stadium, Chonburi
Attendance: 498
Referee: Yu Hong (China)

=== Group E ===
- All matches were held in Tajikistan.
- Times listed are UTC+5:00.

Pos	Team	Pld	W	D	L	GF	GA	GD	Pts	Qualification
1	Philippines	3	3	0	0	16	0	+16	9	Second round
2	Hong Kong	3	2	0	1	5	4	+1	6	
3	Pakistan	3	1	0	2	1	6	−5	3	
4	Tajikistan (H)	3	0	0	3	0	12	−12	0	

Source: AFC
Rules for classification: Qualification tiebreakers
(H) Hosts
5 April 2023
16:00

Philippines	4–0	Pakistan
Long 22'; Bolden 26'; Madarang 29'; C. McDaniel 85'	Report

Hisor Central Stadium, Hisor
Attendance: 100
Referee: Dong Fangyu (China)
5 April 2023
19:00

Hong Kong	3–0	Tajikistan
Khudododova 7' (o.g.); Sin Chung Yee 45+1'; Halasan Tsang 88'	Report

Hisor Central Stadium, Hisor
Attendance: 50
Referee: Asaka Koizumi (Japan)

8 April 2023
16:00

Pakistan	0–2	Hong Kong
	Report	Chu Po Yan 73'; Lau Yun Yi 90'

Hisor Central Stadium, Hisor
Attendance: 100
Referee: Abirami Naidu (Singapore)
8 April 2023
19:00

Tajikistan	0–8	Philippines
	Report	Harrison 26'; Annis 28'; Frilles 31'; Quezada 35'; Serrano 38'; Alcantara 45+3'; C. McDaniel 60', 89'

Hisor Central Stadium, Hisor
Attendance: 85
Referee: Mahnaz Zokaee (Iran)

11 April 2023
16:00

Philippines	4–0	Hong Kong
Bolden 5', 41'; Serrano 44'; Quezada 53'	Report

Hisor Central Stadium, Hisor
Attendance: 275
Referee: Asaka Koizumi (Japan)
11 April 2023
19:00

Tajikistan	0–1	Pakistan
	Report	Malik 26'

Hisor Central Stadium, Hisor
Attendance: 170
Referee: Ranjita Devi Tekcham (India)

=== Group F ===
- All matches were held in Lebanon.
- Times listed are UTC+3:00.

Pos	Team	Pld	W	D	L	GF	GA	GD	Pts	Qualification
1	Chinese Taipei	2	2	0	0	9	1	+8	6	Second round
2	Lebanon (H)	2	1	0	1	6	5	+1	3	
3	Indonesia	2	0	0	2	0	9	−9	0	

Source: AFC
Rules for classification: Qualification tiebreakers
(H) Hosts
5 April 2023
14:30

Lebanon	1–5	Chinese Taipei
Khoury 9'	Report	Hsu Yi-yun 26'; Chang Su-hsin 30', 45'; Ting Chi 32', 90+4'

Fouad Chehab Stadium, Jounieh
Attendance: 250
Referee: Veronika Bernatskaya (Kyrgyzstan)

8 April 2023
14:30

Indonesia	0–5	Lebanon
	Report	Iskandar 29', 79'; Khoury 45+2' (pen.); Bou Rada 59' (pen.); Maalouf 69'

Fouad Chehab Stadium, Jounieh
Attendance: 338
Referee: Công Thị Dung (Vietnam)

11 April 2023
14:30

Chinese Taipei	4–0	Indonesia
Wang Hsiang-huei 7'; Hsu Yi-yun 35'; Chere 87' (o.g.); Wu Kai-ching 90'	Report

Fouad Chehab Stadium, Jounieh
Attendance: 165
Referee: Casey Reibelt (Australia)

=== Group G ===
- All matches were held in Kyrgyzstan.
- Times listed are UTC+6:00.

Pos	Team	Pld	W	D	L	GF	GA	GD	Pts	Qualification
1	India	2	2	0	0	9	0	+9	6	Second round
2	Kyrgyzstan (H)	2	0	0	2	0	9	−9	0	
3	Turkmenistan	0	0	0	0	0	0	0	0	Withdrew

Source: AFC
Rules for classification: Qualification tiebreakers
(H) Hosts
4 April 2023
20:00

Kyrgyzstan	0–5	India
	Report	Tamang 6', 42'; Guguloth 45+3'; Hemam 61'; Gour 63'

Dolen Omurzakov Stadium, Bishkek
Attendance: 354
Referee: Pansa Chaisanit (Thailand)

7 April 2023
20:00

India	4–0	Kyrgyzstan
Sandhiya 18', 57'; Tamang 25'; Gour 85'	Report

Dolen Omurzakov Stadium, Bishkek
Attendance: 450
Referee: Kim Yu-jeong (South Korea)

== Second round ==
The draw for the second round of the qualifiers was held at the AFC House in Kuala Lumpur, Malaysia on 18 May 2023. For the second round, the twelve teams were drawn into three groups of four. The teams were seeded according to the March 2023 FIFA World Rankings, with North Korea unranked due to inactivity.

Participation in qualification second round
Pot 1	Pot 2	Pot 3	Pot 4
1. **Australia** (10) **(H)**; 2. **Japan** (11); 3. China (13) **(H)**	4. South Korea (17); 5. Vietnam (33); 6. Chinese Taipei (37)	7. Thailand (44); 8. Philippines (49); 9. **Uzbekistan** (50) **(H)**	10. India (61); 11. Iran (67); 12. **North Korea** (NR)

Notes

- Teams in **bold** qualified for the third round.
- (H): Qualification second round group hosts

=== Group A ===
- All matches were held in Perth, Australia. Due to strong demand, the second match day venue was moved to the larger Perth Stadium.
- Times listed are UTC+8.

Pos	Team	Pld	W	D	L	GF	GA	GD	Pts	Qualification
1	Australia (H)	3	3	0	0	13	0	+13	**9**	Third round
2	Philippines	3	2	0	1	5	9	−4	**6**	
3	Iran	3	0	1	2	0	3	−3	**1**	
4	Chinese Taipei	3	0	1	2	1	7	−6	**1**	

Source: AFC
(H) Hosts
26 October 2023
16:00

Chinese Taipei	1–4	Philippines
Hsu Yi-yun 47'	Report	Bolden 54' (pen.), 83'; Guillou 61'; C. McDaniel 90'

Perth Rectangular Stadium, Perth
Attendance: 2,725
Referee: Asaka Koizumi (Japan)
26 October 2023
19:00

Australia	2–0	Iran
Carpenter 19'; Kerr 78'	Report

Perth Rectangular Stadium, Perth
Attendance: 18,798
Referee: Oh Hyeon-jeong (South Korea)

29 October 2023
15:10

Philippines	0–8	Australia
	Report	Fowler 15'; Kerr 19', 45+2', 46'; Foord 30', 34', 56'; Wheeler 72'

Perth Stadium, Perth
Attendance: 59,155
Referee: Ranjita Devi Tekcham (India)
29 October 2023
18:10

Iran	0–0	Chinese Taipei
	Report

Perth Stadium, Perth
Attendance: 2,117
Referee: Choki Om (Bhutan)

1 November 2023
15:50

Philippines	1–0	Iran
Annis 19'	Report

Perth Rectangular Stadium, Perth
Attendance: 3,111
Referee: Yu Hong (China)
1 November 2023
19:00

Australia	3–0	Chinese Taipei
Fowler 62'; Kerr 68'; Yallop 76'	Report

Perth Rectangular Stadium, Perth
Attendance: 19,084
Referee: Oh Hyeon-jeong (South Korea)

=== Group B ===
- All matches were held in Xiamen, China.
- Times listed are UTC+8.

Pos	Team	Pld	W	D	L	GF	GA	GD	Pts	Qualification
1	North Korea	3	2	1	0	9	1	+8	**7**	Third round
2	South Korea	3	1	2	0	11	2	+9	**5**	
3	China (H)	3	1	1	1	5	3	+2	**4**	
4	Thailand	3	0	0	3	1	20	−19	**0**	

Source: AFC
(H) Hosts
26 October 2023
15:30

South Korea	10–1	Thailand
Phair 33', 56', 66'; Chun Ga-ram 36', 49', 75'; Kang Chae-rim 39', 54'; Lee Geum-min 68'; Moon Mi-ra 72'	Report	Rinyaphat 90+3'

Xiamen Egret Stadium, Xiamen
Attendance: 2,269
Referee: Lê Thị Ly (Vietnam)
26 October 2023
19:35

China	1–2	North Korea
Yan Jinjin 51'	Report	Sung Hyang-sim 4'; Han Jin-hong 76'

Xiamen Egret Stadium, Xiamen
Attendance: 12,789
Referee: Kate Jacewicz (Australia)

29 October 2023
15:30

North Korea	0–0	South Korea
	Report

Xiamen Egret Stadium, Xiamen
Attendance: 7,582
Referee: Lê Thị Ly (Vietnam)
29 October 2023
19:35

Thailand	0–3	China
	Report	Yan Jinjin 15'; Chen Qiaozhu 68'; Wurigumula 80'

Xiamen Egret Stadium, Xiamen
Attendance: 20,706
Referee: Yoshimi Yamashita (Japan)

1 November 2023
15:30

Thailand	0–7	North Korea
	Report	Kim Kyong-yong 22', 27', 59'; Sung Hyang-sim 24'; Kim Jong-sim 80'; Ri Hak 86'; Ju Hyo-sim 89'

Xiamen Egret Stadium, Xiamen
Attendance: 869
Referee: Plong Pich Akara (Cambodia)
1 November 2023
19:35

China	1–1	South Korea
Wang Shanshan 78'	Report	Shim Seo-yeon 62'

Xiamen Egret Stadium, Xiamen
Attendance: 21,958
Referee: Kate Jacewicz (Australia)

=== Group C ===
- All matches were held in Tashkent, Uzbekistan.
- Times listed are UTC+5.

Pos	Team	Pld	W	D	L	GF	GA	GD	Pts	Qualification
1	Japan	3	3	0	0	11	0	+11	**9**	Third round
2	Uzbekistan (H)	3	2	0	1	4	2	+2	**6**	Third round
3	Vietnam	3	1	0	2	3	4	−1	**3**	
4	India	3	0	0	3	1	13	−12	**0**	

Source: AFC
(H) Hosts
26 October 2023
15:00

Japan	7–0	India
Nakashima 17', 46'; Hayashi 53'; Tanaka 54'; Moriya 56'; Seike 73'; Naomoto 81'	Report

Lokomotiv Stadium, Tashkent
Attendance: 100
Referee: Yang Shu-ting (Chinese Taipei)
26 October 2023
17:00

Vietnam	0–1	Uzbekistan
	Report	Khabibullaeva 30'

Milliy Stadium, Tashkent
Attendance: 2,570
Referee: Casey Reibelt (Australia)

29 October 2023
15:00

India	1–3	Vietnam
Sandhiya 80'	Report	Huỳnh Như 4'; Trần Thị Hải Linh 22'; Phạm Hải Yến 73'

Lokomotiv Stadium, Tashkent
Attendance: 150
Referee: Pansa Chaisanit (Thailand)
29 October 2023
17:00

Uzbekistan	0–2	Japan
	Report	Minami 10'; Chiba 15'

Milliy Stadium, Tashkent
Attendance: 1,935
Referee: Cha Min-ji (South Korea)

1 November 2023
15:00

Japan	2–0	Vietnam
Shimizu 40'; Moriya 53'	Report

Lokomotiv Stadium, Tashkent
Attendance: 200
Referee: Yang Shu-Ting (Chinese Taipei)
1 November 2023
17:00

Uzbekistan	3–0	India
Kudratova 2'; Karachik 51', 83'	Report

Milliy Stadium, Tashkent
Attendance: 1,850
Referee: Veronika Bernatskaya (Kyrgyzstan)

=== Ranking of group runners-up ===
Pos	Grp	Team	Pld	W	D	L	GF	GA	GD	Pts	Qualification
1	**C**	Uzbekistan	3	2	0	1	4	2	+2	**6**	Third round
2	**A**	Philippines	3	2	0	1	5	9	−4	**6**	
3	**B**	South Korea	3	1	2	0	11	2	+9	**5**	

Source: AFC
Rules for classification: 1) Points; 2) Goal difference; 3) Goals scored; 4) Lower disciplinary points total; 5) Drawing of lots.

== Third round ==
The third round featured the three group winners (Australia, North Korea, Japan) and best group runners-up (Uzbekistan) from the second round. The third round winners, Australia and Japan, qualified for the 2024 Summer Olympics as the two AFC representatives.

Combinations of matches

The specific match-ups depended on the group from which the best runners-up qualified.

Combination according to the qualified team

Best runner-up qualifies from group	1A vs	1B vs	1C vs
A	1C	2A	1A
B	1B	1A	2B
C	2C	1C	1B

Teams qualified for the third round
Group	Winners	Best runners-up
A	Australia	—
B	North Korea	—
C	Japan	Uzbekistan

=== Summary ===
Team 1	Agg.	Team 2	1st leg	2nd leg
Uzbekistan	0–13	Australia	0–3	0–10
North Korea	1–2	Japan	0–0	1–2

=== Matches ===
24 February 2024
14:00 UTC+5

Uzbekistan	0–3	Australia
	Report	Heyman 74'; Fowler 84'; Foord 86'

Milliy Stadium, Tashkent
Attendance: 2,347
Referee: Oh Hyeon-jeong (South Korea)
28 February 2024
20:10 UTC+11

Australia	10–0	Uzbekistan
Asadova 1' (o.g.); Heyman 4', 8', 16', 45+3'; Torpey 22'; Fowler 36'; Foord 38'; Raso 68'; Sayer 90+4'	Report

Docklands Stadium, Melbourne
Attendance: 54,120
Referee: Yoshimi Yamashita (Japan)

Australia won 13–0 on aggregate.

24 February 2024
16:04 UTC+3

North Korea	0–0	Japan
	Report

Prince Abdullah Al-Faisal Stadium, Jeddah (Saudi Arabia)
Attendance: 100
Referee: Lê Thị Ly (Vietnam)
28 February 2024
18:34 UTC+9

Japan	2–1	North Korea
Takahashi 26'; Fujino 76'	Report	Kim Hye-yong 81'

Japan National Stadium, Tokyo
Attendance: 20,777
Referee: Casey Reibelt (Australia)

Japan won 2–1 on aggregate.

== Qualified teams for the 2024 Summer Olympics ==
The following two teams from AFC qualified for the 2024 Summer Olympic women's football tournament in France.

Team	Qualified on	Previous appearances in Summer Olympics
Australia	28 February 2024	4 (2000 (Note: Australia qualified as a member of the OFC in 2000 and 2004.), 2004, 2016, 2020)
Japan	28 February 2024	5 (1996, 2004, 2008, 2012, 2020)

Notes

Italic indicates hosts for that year.

== Goalscorers ==
There were 183 goals scored in 46 matches, for an average of 3.98 goals per match.

9 goals

- (Uzbekistan) Diyorakhon Khabibullaeva

5 goals

- (Australia) Caitlin Foord
- (Australia) Michelle Heyman
- (Australia) Sam Kerr
- (Philippines) Sarina Bolden

4 goals

- (Australia) Mary Fowler
- (North Korea) Kim Kyong-yong
- (Philippines) Chandler McDaniel
- (Uzbekistan) Lyudmila Karachik
- (Vietnam) Phạm Hải Yến

3 goals

- (Bhutan) Namgyel Dema
- (Chinese Taipei) Hsu Yi-yun
- (India) Sandhiya Ranganathan
- (India) Anju Tamang
- (South Korea) Chun Ga-ram
- (South Korea) Casey Phair
- (Thailand) Jiraporn Mongkoldee
- (Uzbekistan) Nilufar Kudratova
- (Vietnam) Huỳnh Như

2 goals

- (China) Yan Jinjin
- (Chinese Taipei) Chang Su-hsin
- (Chinese Taipei) Ting Chi
- (India) Renu Gour
- (Japan) Miyabi Moriya
- (Japan) Yoshino Nakashima
- (Jordan) Maysa Jbarah
- (Lebanon) Lili Iskandar
- (Lebanon) Pilar Khoury
- (Mongolia) Narmandakh Namuunaa
- (North Korea) Sung Hyang-sim
- (Philippines) Tahnai Annis
- (Philippines) Quinley Quezada
- (Philippines) Meryll Serrano
- (South Korea) Kang Chae-rim
- (Thailand) Saowalak Pengngam
- (Uzbekistan) Maftuna Shoyimova
- (Uzbekistan) Umida Zoirova

1 goal

- (Australia) Ellie Carpenter
- (Australia) Hayley Raso
- (Australia) Amy Sayer
- (Australia) Kaitlyn Torpey
- (Australia) Clare Wheeler
- (Australia) Tameka Yallop
- (Bhutan) Jamyang Choden
- (Bhutan) Sunita Rai
- (China) Chen Qiaozhu
- (China) Wang Shanshan
- (China) Wurigumula
- (Chinese Taipei) Wang Hsiang-huei
- (Chinese Taipei) Wu Kai-ching
- (Hong Kong) Chu Po Yan
- (Hong Kong) Lau Yun Yi
- (Hong Kong) Sin Chung Yee
- (Hong Kong) Halasan Tsang
- (India) Hemam Shilky Devi
- (India) Soumya Guguloth
- (Iran) Afsaneh Chatrenoor
- (Iran) Negin Zandi
- (Japan) Remina Chiba
- (Japan) Aoba Fujino
- (Japan) Honoka Hayashi
- (Japan) Moeka Minami
- (Japan) Hikaru Naomoto
- (Japan) Kiko Seike
- (Japan) Risa Shimizu
- (Japan) Hana Takahashi
- (Japan) Mina Tanaka
- (Jordan) Sarah Abu-Sabbah
- (Jordan) Ayah Al-Majali
- (Lebanon) Yara Bou Rada
- (Lebanon) Christy Maalouf
- (Myanmar) Win Theingi Tun
- (Nepal) Sabitra Bhandari
- (North Korea) Han Jin-hong
- (North Korea) Ju Hyo-sim
- (North Korea) Kim Jong-sim
- (North Korea) Ri Hak
- (Pakistan) Zahmena Malik
- (Philippines) Maya Alcantara
- (Philippines) Carleigh Frilles
- (Philippines) Katrina Guillou
- (Philippines) Sofia Harrison
- (Philippines) Hali Long
- (Philippines) Eva Madarang
- (Singapore) Izzati Rosni
- (Singapore) Danelle Tan
- (South Korea) Lee Geum-min
- (South Korea) Moon Mi-ra
- (South Korea) Shim Seo-yeon
- (Thailand) Pattaranan Aupachai
- (Thailand) Panittha Jeeratanapavibul
- (Thailand) Orawan Keereesuwannakul
- (Thailand) Rinyaphat Moondong
- (Thailand) Nutwadee Pram-nak
- (Thailand) Ploychompoo Somnuek
- (Thailand) Pluemjai Sontisawat
- (Thailand) Orapin Waenngoen
- (Timor-Leste) Godelivia
- (Timor-Leste) Nilda
- (Uzbekistan) Ilvina Ablyakimova
- (Uzbekistan) Nafisa Nabiqulova
- (Uzbekistan) Aziza Norboeva
- (Vietnam) Nguyễn Thị Bích Thùy
- (Vietnam) Trần Thị Hải Linh
- (Vietnam) Nguyễn Thị Thanh Nhã

1 own goal

- (Indonesia) Remini Chere (against Chinese Taipei)
- (Tajikistan) Nekubakht Khudododova (against Hong Kong)
- (Uzbekistan) Dilrabo Asadova (against Australia)

== See also ==
- 2024 AFC U-23 Asian Cup (AFC qualifiers for the 2024 Summer Olympics men's football tournament)
