= Yan Jinjin =

Chinese footballer (born 1996)

Personal information
- Full name: Yan Jinjin
- Date of birth: 10 September 1996 (age 30)
- Place of birth: China
- Position: Midfielder

Team information
- Current team: Shanghai Shengli

International career^{‡}
Years	Team	Apps	(Gls)
2015	China U19	?	(3)
2019	China U21	1	(0)
2017–2018	China	8	(0)
- ‡ National team caps and goals as of 30 May 2019

Yan Jinjin (Chinese: 闫锦锦; pinyin: Yán Jǐnjǐn, born 10 September 1996) is a Chinese footballer who plays as a midfielder. She has been a member of the China women's national team.

== International goals ==
No.	Date	Venue	Opponent	Score	Result	Competition
1.	24 January 2017	Century Lotus Stadium, Foshan, China	Ukraine	5–0	5–0	2017 Four Nations Tournament
2.	22 September 2023	Linping Sports Centre Stadium, Hangzhou, China	Mongolia	9–0	16–0	2022 Asian Games
3.	22 September 2023	Linping Sports Centre Stadium, Hangzhou, China	Mongolia	14–0	16–0	2022 Asian Games
4.	28 September 2023	Linping Sports Centre Stadium, Hangzhou, China	Uzbekistan	5–0	6–0	2022 Asian Games
5.	28 September 2023	Linping Sports Centre Stadium, Hangzhou, China	Uzbekistan	6–0	6–0	2022 Asian Games
6.	26 October 2023	Xiamen Egret Stadium, Xiamen, China	North Korea	1–1	1–2	2024 AFC Women's Olympic Qualifying Tournament
7.	29 October 2023	Xiamen Egret Stadium, Xiamen, China	Thailand	1–0	3–0	2024 AFC Women's Olympic Qualifying Tournament
