= Football at the 2022 Asian Games – Women's tournament =

2022 Women's Asian Games Football Tournament

Tournament details
- Host country: China
- Dates: 21 September – 6 October 2023
- Teams: 16 (from 1 confederation)
- Venues: 5 (in 2 host cities)

Final positions
- Champions: Japan (3rd title)
- Runners-up: North Korea
- Third place: China
- Fourth place: Uzbekistan

Tournament statistics
- Matches played: 28
- Goals scored: 154 (5.5 per match)
- Attendance: 278,373 (9,942 per match)
- Top scorer(s): (North Korea) Kim Kyong-yong (12 goals)

Football at the 2022 Asian Games was held from 21 September to 6 October 2023 in China.

== Competition schedule ==
All times are local China Standard Time (UTC+8).

G	Group stage	¼	Quarter-finals	½	Semi-finals	B	Bronze medal match	F	Gold medal match

Date Event	Tue 19	Wed 20	Thu 21	Fri 22	Sat 23	Sun 24	Mon 25	Tue 26	Wed 27	Thu 28	Fri 29	Sat 30	Sun 1	Mon 2	Tue 3	Wed 4	Thu 5	Fri 6		Sat 7
Women			G			G			G			¼			½			B	F	

== Seed ==
The draw for the tournament was held on 27 July 2023. The teams were seeded into four pots based on their performances in the previous Asian Games in 2018. The hosts China were automatically assigned position A1. Iran and Cambodia withdrew after the draw.

Pot 1 (Seeded 1 to 5)	Pot 2 (Seeded 6 to 8, plus 2 Non-Seeded)	Pot 3 (Non-Seeded)
1. China (hosts); 2. Japan; 3. South Korea; 4. Chinese Taipei; 5. North Korea	6. Vietnam; 7. Thailand; 8. Hong Kong; 9. Uzbekistan; 10. Singapore	11. Bangladesh; 12. ~~Cambodia~~ (withdrew); 13. India; 14. Mongolia; 15. Myanmar; 16. Nepal; 17. Philippines; 18. ~~Iran~~ (withdrew)

== Venues ==
The tournament was held in five venues across two cities:

Hangzhou			Wenzhou	
Xihu	Shangcheng	Yuhang	Longwan	Lucheng
Huanglong Sports Centre Stadium	Shangcheng Sports Centre Stadium	Linping Sports Center Stadium	Wenzhou Olympic Sports Center Stadium	Wenzhou Sports Center Stadium
Capacity: 51,971	Capacity: 13,500	Capacity: 10,200	Capacity: 50,000	Capacity: 18,000
Map of Zhejiang with 2022 Football of Asian Games venues marked.

== Group stage ==
All times are local, CST (UTC+8).
The top team in each group, and three second-placed teams among five groups advance to the quarter-finals. The draws were held on July 27, 2023 at Hangzhou, China. The teams are drawn in 5 groups, with 3 groups of 3 teams each and 2 groups of 4 teams each. The winner of each group and 3 best runners-up will qualify to knockout stage.

=== Group A ===
Pos	Team	Pld	W	D	L	GF	GA	GD	Pts	Qualification
1	China (H)	2	2	0	0	22	0	+22	6	Knockout stage
2	Uzbekistan	2	1	0	1	6	6	0	3	Knockout stage
3	Mongolia	2	0	0	2	0	22	−22	0	
4	Iran	0	0	0	0	0	0	0	0	Withdrew

Source: Football – Women – Groups
Rules for classification: Group stage tiebreakers
(H) Hosts
22 September 2023
19:30 UTC+8

China	16–0	Mongolia
Wang Shuang 2', 19', 26', 37', 59'; Wang Shanshan 8', 31'; Liu Yanqiu 24'; Yang Lina 39'; Yan Jinjin 50', 84'; Wurigumula 57', 86'; Ou Yiyao 73'; Zhang Xin 76', 90+2'	Report

Linping Sports Center Stadium, Hangzhou
Attendance: 6,910
Referee: Mahnaz Zokaee (Iran)

25 September 2023
19:30 UTC+8

Mongolia	0–6	Uzbekistan
	Report	Norboeva 36'; Tojiddinova 45+2'; Shoyimova 58'; Khabibullaeva 78', 90+5'; Kudratova 85'

Linping Sports Center Stadium, Hangzhou
Attendance: 6,841
Referee: RD Tekcham (India)

28 September 2023
19:30 UTC+8

Uzbekistan	0–6	China
	Report	Wang Shanshan 33', 50'; Shen Mengyu 52'; Chen Qiaozhu 56'; Yan Jinjin 78' (pen.), 90+4'

Linping Sports Center Stadium, Hangzhou
Attendance: 7,523
Referee: Thein Thein Aye (Myanmar)

=== Group B ===
Pos	Team	Pld	W	D	L	GF	GA	GD	Pts	Qualification
1	Chinese Taipei	2	2	0	0	3	1	+2	6	Knockout stage
2	Thailand	2	1	0	1	1	1	0	3	Knockout stage
3	India	2	0	0	2	1	3	−2	0	

Source: Football – Women – Groups
Rules for classification: Group stage tiebreakers
21 September 2023
19:30 UTC+8

Chinese Taipei	2–1	India
Lai Li-chin 68'; Su Yu-hsuan 84'	Report	Tamang 46'

Wenzhou Olympic Sports Center Stadium, Wenzhou
Attendance: 5,681
Referee: Casey Reibelt (Australia)

24 September 2023
16:00 UTC+8

India	0–1	Thailand
	Report	Parichat 51'

Wenzhou Olympic Sports Center Stadium, Wenzhou
Attendance: 16,047
Referee: Le Thi Ly (Vietnam)

27 September 2023
19:30 UTC+8

Thailand	0–1	Chinese Taipei
	Report	Phornphirun 36' (o.g.)

Wenzhou Olympic Sports Center Stadium, Wenzhou
Attendance: 14,050
Referee: Kim Yu-jeong (KOR)

=== Group C ===
Pos	Team	Pld	W	D	L	GF	GA	GD	Pts	Qualification
1	North Korea	2	2	0	0	17	0	+17	6	Knockout stage
2	Singapore	2	0	0	2	0	17	−17	0	
3	Cambodia	0	0	0	0	0	0	0	0	Withdrew

Source: Football – Women – Groups
Rules for classification: Group stage tiebreakers
24 September 2023
19:30 UTC+8

North Korea	7–0	Singapore
Hong Song-ok 11'; Ri Kum-hyang 14'; Myong Yu-jong 51'; Ju Hyo-sim 54'; Ri Hak 58'; Kim Kyong-yong 62'; Sung Hyang-sim 90+3'	Report

Wenzhou Sports Center Stadium, Wenzhou
Attendance: 5,320
Referee: Haneen Murad (Jordan)

27 September 2023
16:00 UTC+8

Singapore	0–10	North Korea
	Report	Kim Kyong-yong 3', 19' (pen.), 36', 45+1', 90+7'; An Myong-song 15', 60'; Ri Myong-gum 17'; Myong Yu-jong 42'; Pong Song-ae 71'

Wenzhou Sports Center Stadium, Wenzhou
Attendance: 3,669
Referee: Doumouh Al Bakkar (Lebanon)

=== Group D ===
Pos	Team	Pld	W	D	L	GF	GA	GD	Pts	Qualification
1	Japan	3	3	0	0	23	0	+23	9	Knockout stage
2	Vietnam	3	2	0	1	8	8	0	6	
3	Nepal	3	0	1	2	1	11	−10	1	
4	Bangladesh	3	0	1	2	2	15	−13	1	

Source: Football – Women – Groups
Rules for classification: Group stage tiebreakers
22 September 2023
16:00 UTC+8

Vietnam	2–0	Nepal
Phạm Hải Yến 53'; Nguyễn Thị Bích Thùy 64'	Report

Wenzhou Olympic Sports Center Stadium, Wenzhou
Attendance: 1,367
Referee: Dong Fangyu (China)

22 September 2023
19:30 UTC+8

Japan	8–0	Bangladesh
Chiba 7', 29'; Tanikawa 8' (pen.), 80'; Shiokoshi 45'; Hijikata 49'; Sakakibara 58', 85'	Report

Wenzhou Olympic Sports Center Stadium, Wenzhou
Attendance: 2,744
Referee: Kim Yu-jeong (South Korea)

25 September 2023
16:00 UTC+8

Bangladesh	1–6	Vietnam
Parvin 87' (pen.)	Report	Phạm Hải Yến 5'; Nguyễn Thị Thúy Hằng 34'; Trần Thị Duyên 66'; Thái Thị Thảo 78'; Nguyễn Thị Bích Thùy 71', 80'

Wenzhou Olympic Sports Center Stadium, Wenzhou
Attendance: 2,108
Referee: Yu Hong (China)

25 September 2023
19:30 UTC+8

Nepal	0–8	Japan
	Report	Shiokoshi 3'; Yamamoto 13'; Ueno 27'; Wakisaka 30'; Osawa 36' (pen.), 75'; Sakakibara 59'; Hijikata 90+7'

Wenzhou Olympic Sports Center Stadium, Wenzhou
Attendance: 6,195
Referee: Pich Plong (Cambodia)

28 September 2023
16:00 UTC+8

Japan	7–0	Vietnam
Shiokoshi 19', 24'; Chiba 51', 77'; Wakisaka 55' (pen.); Osawa 69', 90+2'	Report

Wenzhou Olympic Sports Center Stadium, Wenzhou
Attendance: 10,174
Referee: Lara Christie Lee (Australia)
28 September 2023
16:00 UTC+8

Nepal	1–1	Bangladesh
Poudel 83'	Report	Khatun 44'

Wenzhou Sports Center Stadium, Wenzhou
Attendance: 3,304
Referee: Yu Hong (China)

=== Group E ===
Pos	Team	Pld	W	D	L	GF	GA	GD	Pts	Qualification
1	South Korea	3	3	0	0	13	1	+12	9	Knockout stage
2	Philippines	3	2	0	1	7	6	+1	6	Knockout stage
3	Myanmar	3	1	0	2	1	6	−5	3	
4	Hong Kong	3	0	0	3	1	9	−8	0	

Source: Football – Women – Groups
Rules for classification: Group stage tiebreakers
22 September 2023
16:00 UTC+8

Hong Kong	1–3	Philippines
Cheung Wai Ki 38'	Report	Bolden 8' (pen.); Quezada 89'; Guillou 90+1'

Wenzhou Sports Center Stadium, Wenzhou
Attendance: 2,552
Referee: Lara Christie Lee (Australia)
22 September 2023
19:30 UTC+8

South Korea	3–0	Myanmar
Lee Eun-young 24'; Ji So-yun 60'; Jeon Eun-ha 68'	Report

Wenzhou Sports Center Stadium, Wenzhou
Attendance: 3,234
Referee: Doumouh Al Bakkar (Lebanon)

25 September 2023
16:00 UTC+8

Myanmar	1–0	Hong Kong
Myat Noe Khin 69'	Report

Wenzhou Sports Center Stadium, Wenzhou
Attendance: 2,333
Referee: Pansa Chaisanit (Thailand)
25 September 2023
19:30 UTC+8

Philippines	1–5	South Korea
Bolden 8'	Report	Chun Ga-ram 12'; Son Hwa-yeon 44', 56', 70'; Ji So-yun 52' (pen.)

Wenzhou Sports Center Stadium, Wenzhou
Attendance: 2,974
Referee: Asaka Koizumi (Japan)

28 September 2023
19:30 UTC+8

South Korea	5–0	Hong Kong
Moon Mi-ra 29', 45+1'; Mun Eun-ju 47', 70'; Wu Choi Yiu 52' (o.g.)	Report

Wenzhou Olympic Sports Center Stadium, Wenzhou
Attendance: 22,083
Referee: Le Thi Ly (Vietnam)
28 September 2023
19:30 UTC+8

Philippines	3–0	Myanmar
Bolden 19' (pen.); Eggesvik 60', 61'	Report

Wenzhou Sports Center Stadium, Wenzhou
Attendance: 4,436
Referee: Asaka Koizumi (Japan)

=== Ranking of best second place ===
For this ranking, the Group E results against Hong Kong (who finished fourth in the only four-team group) and the results of both games in Group C (which had only two teams after Cambodia withdrew after the draw) were excluded.

Pos	Grp	Team	Pld	W	D	L	GF	GA	GD	Pts	Qualification
1	A	Uzbekistan	2	1	0	1	6	6	0	3	Knockout stage
2	B	Thailand	2	1	0	1	1	1	0	3	Knockout stage
3	E	Philippines	2	1	0	1	4	5	−1	3	Knockout stage
4	D	Vietnam	2	1	0	1	2	7	−5	3	

Source: Football – Women – Groups

== Knockout stage ==
All times are local, CST (UTC+8).

=== Bracket ===
Quarter-finals
30 September 2023 – Linping
China	4
Thailand	0
30 September 2023 – Wenzhou
Japan	8
Philippines	1
30 September 2023 – Linping
Chinese Taipei	1
Uzbekistan (a.e.t.)	2
30 September 2023 – Wenzhou
South Korea	1
North Korea	4

Semi-finals
3 October 2023 – Linping
China	3
Japan	4
3 October 2023 – Shangcheng
Uzbekistan	0
North Korea	8

Gold medal match
6 October 2023 – Huanglong
Japan	4
North Korea	1
Bronze medal match
6 October 2023 – Huanglong
China	7
Uzbekistan	0

=== Quarter-finals ===
30 September 2023
15:00 UTC+8

Chinese Taipei	1–2 (a.e.t.)	Uzbekistan
Su Yu-hsuan 86'	Report	Khabibullaeva 52'; Zoirova 101'

Linping Sports Center Stadium, Hangzhou
Attendance: 7,515
Referee: Law Bik Chi (Hong Kong)

30 September 2023
16:30 UTC+8

South Korea	1–4	North Korea
An Myong-song 11' (o.g.)	Report	Ri Hak 20', 90'; An Myong-song 81'; Kim Kyong-yong 90+5' (pen.)

Wenzhou Sports Centre, Wenzhou
Attendance: 6,171
Referee: Chaisanit Pansa (Thailand)

30 September 2023
19:30 UTC+8

Japan	8–1	Philippines
Tanikawa 40' (pen.); Osawa 58', 90+4'; Chiba 65'; Ueno 76' (pen.), 78', 81', 90+1'	Report	Bolden 68'

Wenzhou Sports Centre, Wenzhou
Attendance: 33,607
Referee: Casey Reibelt (Australia)

30 September 2023
20:00 UTC+8

China	4–0	Thailand
Wang Shanshan 3'; Wang Shuang 41', 51'; Yang Lina 81'	Report

Linping Sports Center Stadium, Hangzhou
Attendance: 7,932
Referee: Veronika Bernatskaia (Kyrgyzstan)

=== Semi-finals ===
3 October 2023
18:00 UTC+8

Uzbekistan	0–8	North Korea
	Report	Hong Song-ok 9'; Kim Kyong-yong 18' (pen.), 46', 63', 83'; An Myong-song 45+2'; Ri Hak 50'; Kim Hye-yong 90+1'

Shangcheng Sports Centre Stadium, Hangzhou
Attendance: 10,402
Referee: Le Thi Ly (Vietnam)

3 October 2023
20:00 UTC+8

China	3–4	Japan
Wang Linlin 20'; Zhang Linyan 55'; Yang Lina 61'	Report	Nakashima 12'; Tanikawa 31'; Chiba 35'; Koga 43'

Linping Sports Center Stadium, Hangzhou
Attendance: 8,006
Referee: Kim Yu-jeong (South Korea)

=== Bronze medal match ===
6 October 2023
15:00 UTC+8

(bronze) China	7–0	Uzbekistan
Ou Yiyao 1'; Chen Qiaozhu 26', 62'; Wang Shanshan 45'; Wurigumula 59'; Gu Yasha 65'; Yao Wei 67'	Report

Huanglong Sports Centre Stadium, Hangzhou
Attendance: 38,029
Referee: Asaka Koizumi (Japan)

=== Gold medal match ===
6 October 2023
20:00 UTC+8

(gold) Japan	4–1	North Korea (silver)
Nakashima 10'; Osawa 66'; Tanikawa 69'; Chiba 72'	Report	Kim Kyong-yong 38'

Huanglong Sports Centre Stadium, Hangzhou
Attendance: 37,166
Referee: Veronika Bernatskaia (Kyrgyzstan)

== Goalscorers ==
There were 154 goals scored in 28 matches, for an average of 5.5 goals per match.

12 goals

- (North Korea) Kim Kyong-yong

7 goals

- (China) Wang Shuang
- (Japan) Remina Chiba
- (Japan) Haruka Osawa

6 goals

- (China) Wang Shanshan

5 goals

- (Japan) Momoko Tanikawa
- (Japan) Mami Ueno

4 goals

- (China) Yan Jinjin
- (Japan) Yuzuho Shiokoshi
- (North Korea) An Myong-song
- (North Korea) Ri Hak
- (Philippines) Sarina Bolden

3 goals

- (China) Chen Qiaozhu
- (China) Wurigumula
- (China) Yang Lina
- (Japan) Kotono Sakakibara
- (South Korea) Son Hwa-yeon
- (Uzbekistan) Diyorakhon Khabibullaeva
- (Vietnam) Nguyễn Thị Bích Thùy

2 goals

- (China) Ou Yiyao
- (China) Zhang Xin
- (Chinese Taipei) Su Yu-hsuan
- (Japan) Maya Hijikata
- (Japan) Yoshino Nakashima
- (Japan) Reina Wakisaka
- (North Korea) Hong Song-ok
- (North Korea) Myong Yu-jong
- (Philippines) Sara Eggesvik
- (South Korea) Ji So-yun
- (South Korea) Moon Mi-ra
- (South Korea) Mun Eun-ju
- (Vietnam) Phạm Hải Yến

1 goal

- (Bangladesh) Sabina Khatun
- (Bangladesh) Masura Parvin
- (China) Gu Yasha
- (China) Liu Yanqiu
- (China) Shen Mengyu
- (China) Wang Linlin
- (China) Yao Wei
- (China) Zhang Linyan
- (Chinese Taipei) Lai Li-chin
- (Hong Kong) Cheung Wai Ki
- (India) Anju Tamang
- (Japan) Toko Koga
- (Japan) Yuzuki Yamamoto
- (Myanmar) Myat Noe Khin
- (Nepal) Rekha Poudel
- (North Korea) Ju Hyo-sim
- (North Korea) Kim Hye-yong
- (North Korea) Pong Song-ae
- (North Korea) Ri Kum-hyang
- (North Korea) Ri Myong-gum
- (North Korea) Sung Hyang-sim
- (Philippines) Katrina Guillou
- (Philippines) Quinley Quezada
- (South Korea) Chun Ga-ram
- (South Korea) Jeon Eun-ha
- (South Korea) Lee Eun-young
- (Thailand) Parichat Thongrong
- (Uzbekistan) Nilufar Kudratova
- (Uzbekistan) Aziza Norboeva
- (Uzbekistan) Maftuna Shoyimova
- (Uzbekistan) Shokhida Tojjiddinova
- (Uzbekistan) Umida Zoirova
- (Vietnam) Nguyễn Thị Thúy Hằng
- (Vietnam) Thái Thị Thảo
- (Vietnam) Trần Thị Duyên

1 own goal

- (Hong Kong) Wu Choi Yiu (against South Korea)
- (North Korea) An Myong-song (against South Korea)
- (Thailand) Phornphirun Philawan (against Chinese Taipei)

== See also ==
- Football at the 2022 Asian Games – Men's tournament
