= Wenzhou Olympic Sports Center Stadium =

Sports venue in Hangzhou, China

Coordinates: 27.9215°N 120.803°E

- Interactive map of Wenzhou Olympic Sports Center Stadium
- Full name: Wenzhou Olympic Sports Centre Stadium
- Location: Hangzhou, China
- Capacity: 50,000
- Surface: Grass

Construction
- Opened: September 2021

Wenzhou Olympic Sports Centre Stadium is a stadium in Wenzhou, China. It was a venue for the 19th Asian Games and has hosted some international football matches and have a capacity of 50,000. Construction was started on 29 June 2018 and opened in September 2021.
