= Gu Yasha =

Chinese footballer (born 1990)

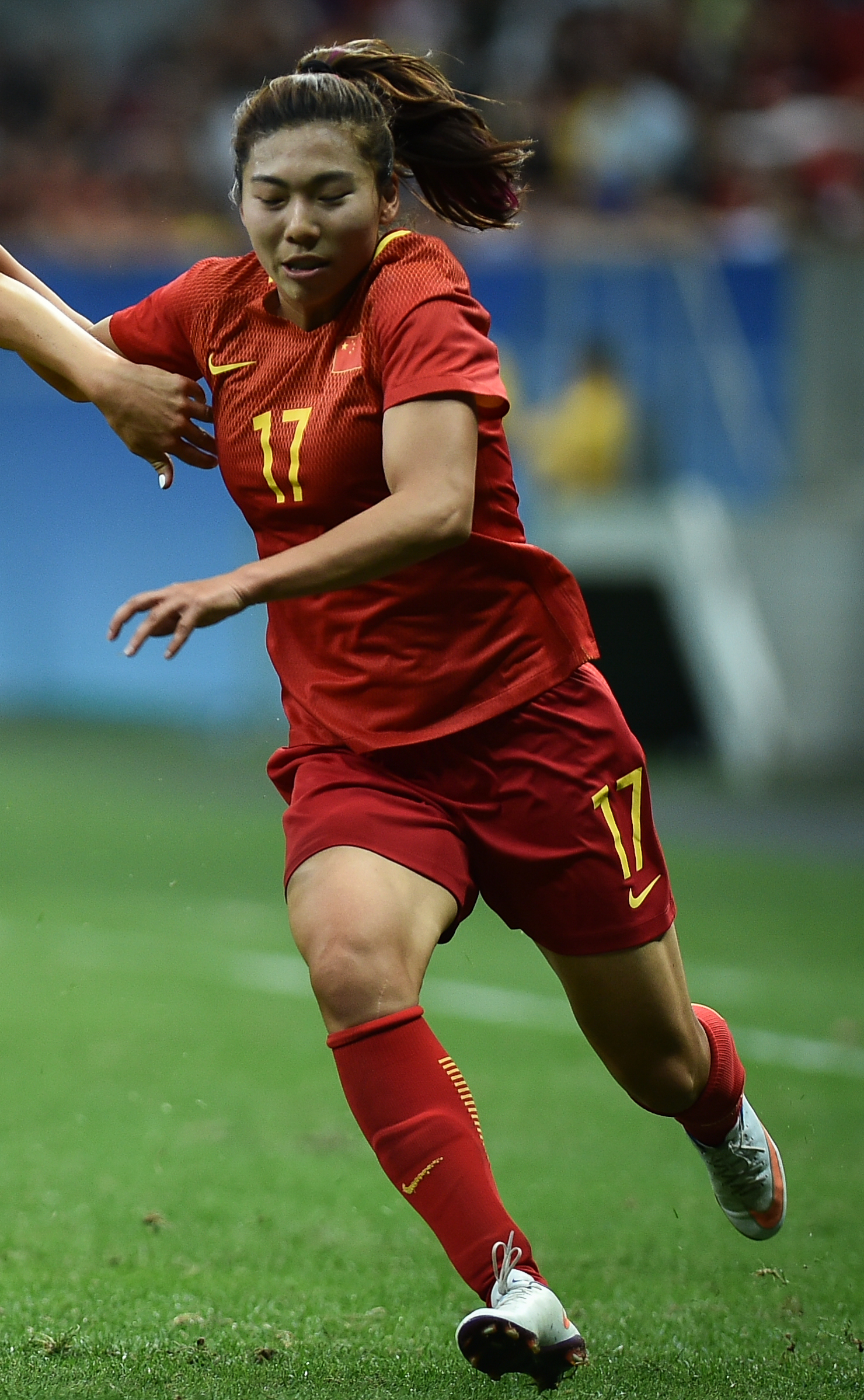
- Gu at the 2016 Summer Olympics

Personal information
- Date of birth: 28 November 1990 (age 35)
- Place of birth: Zhengzhou, Henan Province, China
- Height: 1.65 m (5 ft 5 in)
- Position: Midfielder

Senior career*
Years	Team	Apps	(Gls)
-2020	Beijing Jingtan	0	(0)
2021–2023	Wuhan Jianghan University	12	(2)
2024–2025	Beijing Jingtan	3	(0)

International career^{‡}
2008–2023	China	126	(14)
Medal record
Women's football
Representing China
Asian Games
Silver medal – second place	2018 Palembang	Team
- * Club domestic league appearances and goals ‡ National team caps and goals as of 6 October 2023

Gu Yasha (Chinese: 古雅莎; pinyin: Gǔ Yǎshā; born 28 November 1990) is a Chinese former professional footballer who played as a midfielder.

== Career ==
She starts playing football in 2001, representing Henan at the Beibei Cup. At the beginning of 2002, she joined Beijing Chaoyang District Football School. At the end of 2004, she joined Beijing Zhaotai Club, reaching the National Youth team in 2007.

When Head Coach Shang Ruihua returned to the Chinese team in March 2008, Gu Yasha, then 18, entered the national team, soon becoming a regular starter.

== International career ==
In May 2014, Gu was called up to the China squad for the 2014 AFC Women's Asian Cup.

On 28 May 2015, Gu was called up to the China squad for the 2015 FIFA Women's World Cup.

On 7 July 2016, Gu was called up to the China squad for the 2016 Summer Olympics.

On 29 March 2018, Gu was called up to the China squad for the 2018 AFC Women's Asian Cup.

On 27 May 2019, Gu was called up to the China squad for the 2019 FIFA Women's World Cup.

On 5 July 2023, Gu was called up to the China squad for the 2023 FIFA Women's World Cup.

Gu Yasha officially retired from the national team on June 3, 2026. She received a special ceremony before an international friendly match against Russia in Wuhan, China.

== International goals ==
No.	Date	Venue	Opponent	Score	Result	Competition
1.	12 August 2008	Qinhuangdao Olympic Sports Center Stadium, Qinhuangdao, China	Argentina	2–0	2–0	2008 Summer Olympics
2.	5 September 2014	Beijing Olympic Sports Centre Stadium, Beijing, China	Vietnam	2–0	5–0	Friendly
3.	6 August 2016	Estádio Olímpico João Havelange, Rio de Janeiro, Brazil	South Africa	1–0	2–0	2016 Summer Olympics
4.	17 August 2018	Gelora Sriwijaya Stadium, Palembang, Indonesia	Hong Kong	6–0	7–0	2018 Asian Games
5.	17 August 2018	Gelora Sriwijaya Stadium, Palembang, Indonesia	Hong Kong	7–0	7–0	2018 Asian Games
6.	25 August 2018	Gelora Sriwijaya Stadium, Palembang, Indonesia	Thailand	4–0	5–0	2018 Asian Games
7.	20 January 2019	Wuhua County Olympic Sports Centre, Meizhou, China	South Korea	1–0	1–0	2019 Four Nations Tournament
8.	6 October 2023	Yellow Dragon Sports Center, Hangzhou, China	Uzbekistan	6–0	7–0	2022 Asian Games

== Honours ==
China

- Asian Games silver medalist: 2018; bronze medalist: 2022
- AFC Women's Asian Cup runner-up: 2008

== See also ==
- List of women's footballers with 100 or more caps
