= Yoshino Nakashima =

Japanese footballer (born 1999)

Yoshino Nakashima 中嶋 淑乃
Personal information
- Date of birth: 27 July 1999 (age 27)
- Place of birth: Kumamoto Prefecture, Japan
- Height: 1.61 m (5 ft 3 in)
- Position: Midfielder

Team information
- Current team: Sanfrecce Hiroshima
- Number: 11

Youth career
- 2015–2017: Tokai Univ. Seisho High School

Senior career*
Years	Team	Apps	(Gls)
2018−2020	Orca Kamogawa FC	40	(15)
2021−	Sanfrecce Hiroshima Regina	102	(15)

International career^{‡}
2022–	Japan	14	(5)
- * Club domestic league appearances and goals as of 1 June 2026 (UTC) ‡ National team caps and goals as of 30 September 2026 (UTC)

Yoshino Nakashima (中嶋 淑乃, Nakashima Yoshino; born 27 July 1999) is a Japanese professional footballer who plays as a midfielder for WE League club Sanfrecce Hiroshima Regina and the Japan women's national team.

Her main battle field is the left side, and her skillful dribbling moves are reminiscent of Kaoru Mitoma, a member of the Japan men's national team, so she has been featured on the league's official YouTube channel as the "WE League's Mitoma".

== Club career ==
Nakashima made her WE League debut on 12 September 2021.

== Career statistics ==
=== Club ===
As of match played 16 May 2026

Appearances and goals by club, season and competition
Club	Season	League			National cup (Note: Includes Empress's Cup)		League cup (Note: Includes Nadeshiko League Cup, WE League Cup)		Continental (Note: Includes the AFC Women's Club Championship)		Total	
Club	Season	Division	Apps	Goals	Apps	Goals	Apps	Goals	Apps	Goals	Apps	Goals
Orca Kamogawa FC	2018	Nadeshiko League	4	0	2	0	3	0	–		9	0
Orca Kamogawa FC	2019	Nadeshiko League	18	4	3	0	7	0	–		28	4
Orca Kamogawa FC	2020	Nadeshiko League	18	11	2	0	–		–		20	11
Orca Kamogawa FC	Total		40	15	7	0	10	0	–		57	15
Sanfrecce Hiroshima Regina	2021–22	WE League	20	3	2	0	–		–		22	3
Sanfrecce Hiroshima Regina	2022–23	WE League	20	7	2	0	3	0	–		25	7
Sanfrecce Hiroshima Regina	2023–24	WE League	21	1	3	2	5	2	–		29	5
Sanfrecce Hiroshima Regina	2024–25	WE League	21	1	1	0	5	2	–		27	3
Sanfrecce Hiroshima Regina	2025–26	WE League	20	3	5	4	7	4	–		32	11
Sanfrecce Hiroshima Regina	Total		102	15	13	6	20	8	–		135	29
Career total			142	30	20	6	30	8	–		192	44

=== International ===
As of match played 14 September 2026

National Team	Year	Apps	Goals
Japan	2022	1	0
Japan	2023	4	2
Japan	2024	2	0
Japan	2025	4	0
Japan	2026	3	3
Total		14	5

Scores and results list Japan's goal tally first, score column indicates score after each Nakashima goal.

List of international goals scored by Yoshino Nakashima
No.	Date	Venue	Opponent	Score	Result	Competition
1	26 October 2023	Lokomotiv Stadium, Tashkent, Uzbekistan	India	1–0	7–0	2024 AFC Women's Olympic Qualifying Tournament
2	26 October 2023	Lokomotiv Stadium, Tashkent, Uzbekistan	India	2–0	7–0	2024 AFC Women's Olympic Qualifying Tournament
3	14 September 2026	Shizuoka Stadium, Fukuroi, Shizuoka, Japan	Thailand	1–0	8–0	2026 Asian Games
4	14 September 2026	Shizuoka Stadium, Fukuroi, Shizuoka, Japan	Thailand	3–0	8–0	2026 Asian Games
5	14 September 2026	Shizuoka Stadium, Fukuroi, Shizuoka, Japan	Thailand	4–0	8–0	2026 Asian Games

== Honours ==
Sanfrecce Hiroshima Regina

- Empress's Cup: 2025
- WE League Cup: 2023–24, 2024–25

Japan

- Asian Games: 2022, 2026
- EAFF E-1 Football Championship: 2022
