= Yang Lina (footballer) =

Chinese footballer (born 1994)

Personal information
- Date of birth: 13 April 1994 (age 32)
- Place of birth: Shanghai, China
- Height: 1.73 m (5 ft 8 in)
- Position: Midfielder

Team information
- Current team: Ternana Calcio

Senior career*
Years	Team	Apps	(Gls)
2015–2026	Shanghai Shengli		
2022–2023	→ Paris Saint-Germain (loan)	2	(0)
2023–2024	→ Levante Las Planas (loan)	12	(0)
2024–2025	→ SS Lazio (loan)	18	(3)
2026	Galatasaray	1	(0)
2026–	Ternana Calcio	0	(0)

International career^{‡}
2018–	China	42	(5)
Medal record
Women's football
Representing China
Asian Games
Silver medal – second place	2018 Palembang	Team
AFC Women's Asian Cup
Winner	2022 India
EAFF E-1 Championship
Runner-up	2022 Japan
- * Club domestic league appearances and goals as of 01:42, 23 October 2025 (UTC) ‡ National team caps and goals as of 01:42, 23 October 2025 (UTC)

Yang Lina (simplified Chinese: 杨莉娜; traditional Chinese: 楊莉娜; pinyin: Yáng Lìnà; born 13 April 1994) is a Chinese professional footballer who plays as a midfielder for Turkish Women's Football Super League club Ternana Calcio, and the China national team.

== Club career ==
On 13 September 2022, Yang joined French club Paris Saint-Germain on a season-long loan deal. She arrived just a month after Li Mengwen joined also the team.

In winter she left PSG to join Catalan side Levante Las Planas. Yang had her debut for her new club on Feb 4th, 2023. Levante Las Planas drew 0–0 with Alhama in a Liga F league match. She became a regular starter for the team.

On February 3, 2026, she signed a contract with Turkish giant Galatasaray until the end of the season.

== International career ==
Yang made her debut for the China national team on 17 August 2018 in a 7–0 Asian Games win against Hong Kong. On 6 October 2018, she scored her first goal in a 2–1 friendly win against Finland. In July 2021, she was named in the squad for the 2020 Olympics.

In January 2022, Yang was named in the squad for the 2022 AFC Women's Asian Cup. She played four matches in the tournament as China went on to win their ninth continental title.

== Career statistics ==
=== Club ===
As of match played 3 May 2025

Appearances and goals by club, season and competition
Club	Season	League			National cup		Continental		Total	
Club	Season	Division	Apps	Goals	Apps	Goals	Apps	Goals	Apps	Goals
Paris Saint-Germain (loan)	2022–23	Division 1 Féminine	2	0	0	0	1	0	3	0
Levante Las Planas (loan)	2023–24	Liga F	12	0	0	0	—		12	0
SS Lazio (loan)	2024–25	Seria A	18	0	1	0	—		19	0
Career total			32	0	1	0	1	0	34	0

=== International ===
As of match played 29 October 2024

Appearances and goals by national team and year
National team	Year	Apps	Goals
China	2018	12	2
China	2019	4	0
China	2021	3	0
China	2022	6	0
China	2023	14	3
China	2024	3	0
Total		42	5

Scores and results list China's goal tally first, score column indicates score after each Yang goal.

List of international goals scored by Yang Lina
No.	Date	Venue	Opponent	Score	Result	Competition
1	6 October 2018	Yongchuan Sports Center, Chongqing, China	Finland	1–1	2–1	2018 Yongchuan International Tournament
2	1 December 2018	GFA National Training Center, Dededo, Guam	Mongolia	8–0	10–0	2019 EAFF E-1 Football Championship
3	22 September 2023	Linping Sports Center Stadium, Hangzhou, China	Mongolia	8–0	16–0	2022 Asian Games
4	30 September 2023	Linping Sports Center Stadium, Hangzhou, China	Thailand	4–0	4–0	2022 Asian Games
5	3 October 2023	Linping Sports Center Stadium, Hangzhou, China	Japan	3–4	3–4	2022 Asian Games

== Honours ==
China

- Asian Games silver medalist: 2018; bronze medalist: 2022
- AFC Women's Asian Cup: 2022
- EAFF E-1 Championship runner-up: 2022
