= Liu Yanqiu =

Chinese footballer (born 1995)

Personal information
- Full name: Liu Yanqiu
- Date of birth: 31 December 1995 (age 30)
- Place of birth: China
- Height: 1.59 m (5 ft 2 1/2 in)
- Position: Midfielder

Team information
- Current team: Wuhan Jianghan University
- Number: 15

Senior career*
Years	Team	Apps	(Gls)
2020-	Wuhan Jianghan University	0	(0)

International career^{‡}
2019–	China	5	(0)
- * Club domestic league appearances and goals ‡ National team caps and goals as of 8 June 2019

Liu Yanqiu (Chinese: 刘艳秋; born 31 December 1995) is a Chinese footballer who plays as a midfielder for Wuhan Jianghan University F.C. and the China women's national football team.

== International career ==
Liu was part of the China squad that played in the 2012 FIFA U-17 Women's World Cup and the 2014 FIFA U-20 Women's World Cup. She made her full international debut as a substitute in a friendly match against Russia on 6 April 2019.

== International goals ==
No.	Date	Venue	Opponent	Score	Result	Competition
1.	22 September 2023	Linping Sports Center Stadium, Hangzhou, China	Mongolia	4–0	16–0	2022 Asian Games
