= Wenzhou Sports Centre =

Sporting venue

Coordinates: 28°00′16″N 120°40′20″E

Wenzhou Sports Centre Stadium
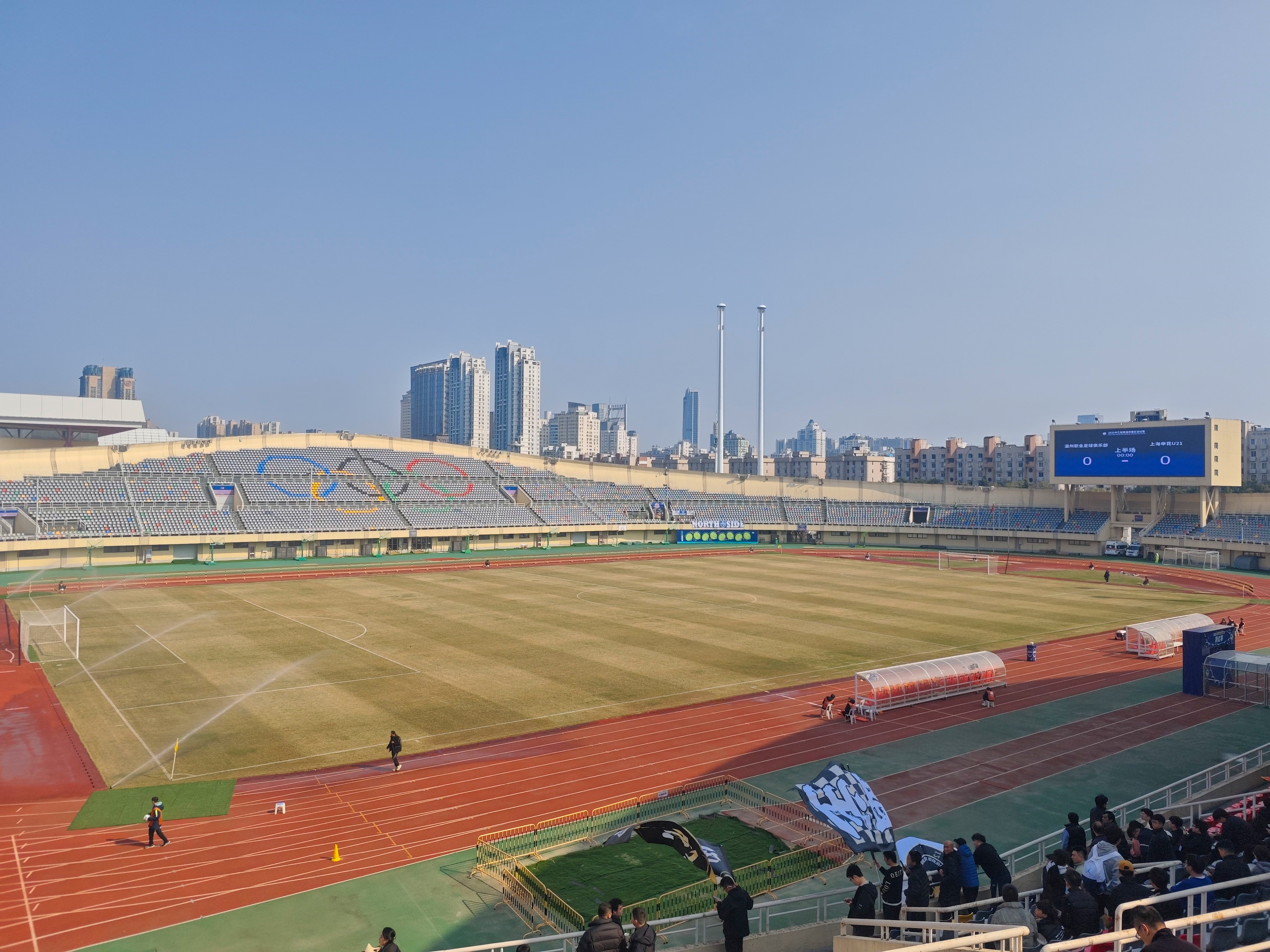
- Interactive map of Wenzhou Sports Centre Stadium
- Address: Wenzhou; China
- Capacity: 14,865

Construction
- Opened: 1996
- Renovated: 2022–2023

The Wenzhou Sports Centre Stadium (Simplified Chinese: 温州体育中心) is a multi-use stadium in Wenzhou, China. It is mostly used for football matches. Established in 1996 with the approval of the Municipal Editorial Committee and under the management of the Wenzhou Sports Bureau, the stadium has a capacity of 14,865.

== History ==
In January 1996, the first phase of the sports centre project was erected. The centre expanded over the years. In order to cultivate the sports market, the centre has attempted to embody "taking the body to nourish the body." Since the centre was built, their revenue has increased, increasing economic benefits and social influence. Wenzhou Sports Center is located at 20 Minhang Road, Lucheng District, Wenzhou City.

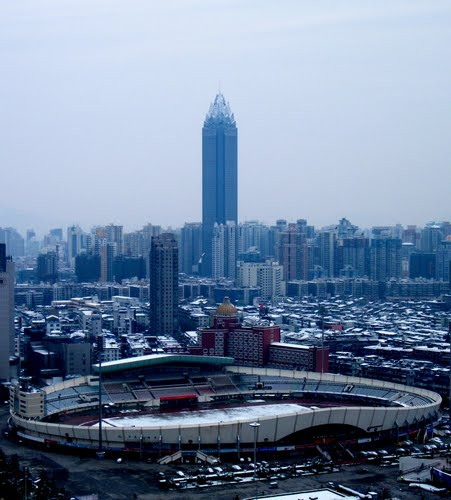
Real picture of Wenzhou Sports Center

== Related venues ==
=== Shooting range ===
Wenzhou Olympic Shooting Hall, under the management of Wenzhou Sports Center, was completed at the end of 2004 and opened in August 2005. It covers an area of 57.57 mu with an investment of 19.48 million yuan. It is a two-story frame structure building with a construction area of 8,107 m^{2} (87,260 sq ft). It is equipped with an air rifle range with 56 conveying targets, a pistol range with 10 groups of electric targets, and a rifle range with 64 groups of lifting targets. It is equipped with a score and display system.

=== Gymnasium ===
Wenzhou Gymnasium has a floor area of 20,206 m^{2} (217,500 sq ft) and a height of 27.2 meters, divided into two floors. The upper floor is the competition hall, which has 4767 fixed seats, 448 activity seats, and elevators and seats for the disabled. It is equipped for electronic competition and can be used for artistic performances and gatherings. The training hall is open to the public as a Mao gymnasium. The ground floor offers nearly 10,000 square meters of shopping.

Directly in front of the stadium is a wide square with a 1,350 m^{2} (14,500 sq ft) music fountain holding 1003 sprinklers and 333 lights. The fountain is accompanied by a melody that changes with the water effects and colours.

=== Natatorium ===
The Wenzhou Natatorium was designated by the Chinese Swimming Association as the national advanced swimming hall. It was completed on October 8, 1998, with an investment of about 80 million yuan. It occupies 19,037.37 m^{2} (204,916.5 sq ft). It includes a standard swimming pool of 25m×50m, a diving pool of 25m×21m, a training pool of 12.5m×25m, and a warm-up pool of 7m×12.5m.

== Concert ==
Wenzhou Stadium hosted its first concert in 2013, which was a concert funded by China's famous Shanghai Zhongliang Real Estate Group Co. It brought together many of today's Chinese music's top stars.

== See also ==
- List of football stadiums in China
- List of stadiums in China
- Lists of stadiums
