= Linping Sports Centre Stadium =

Sports venue in Hangzhou, China

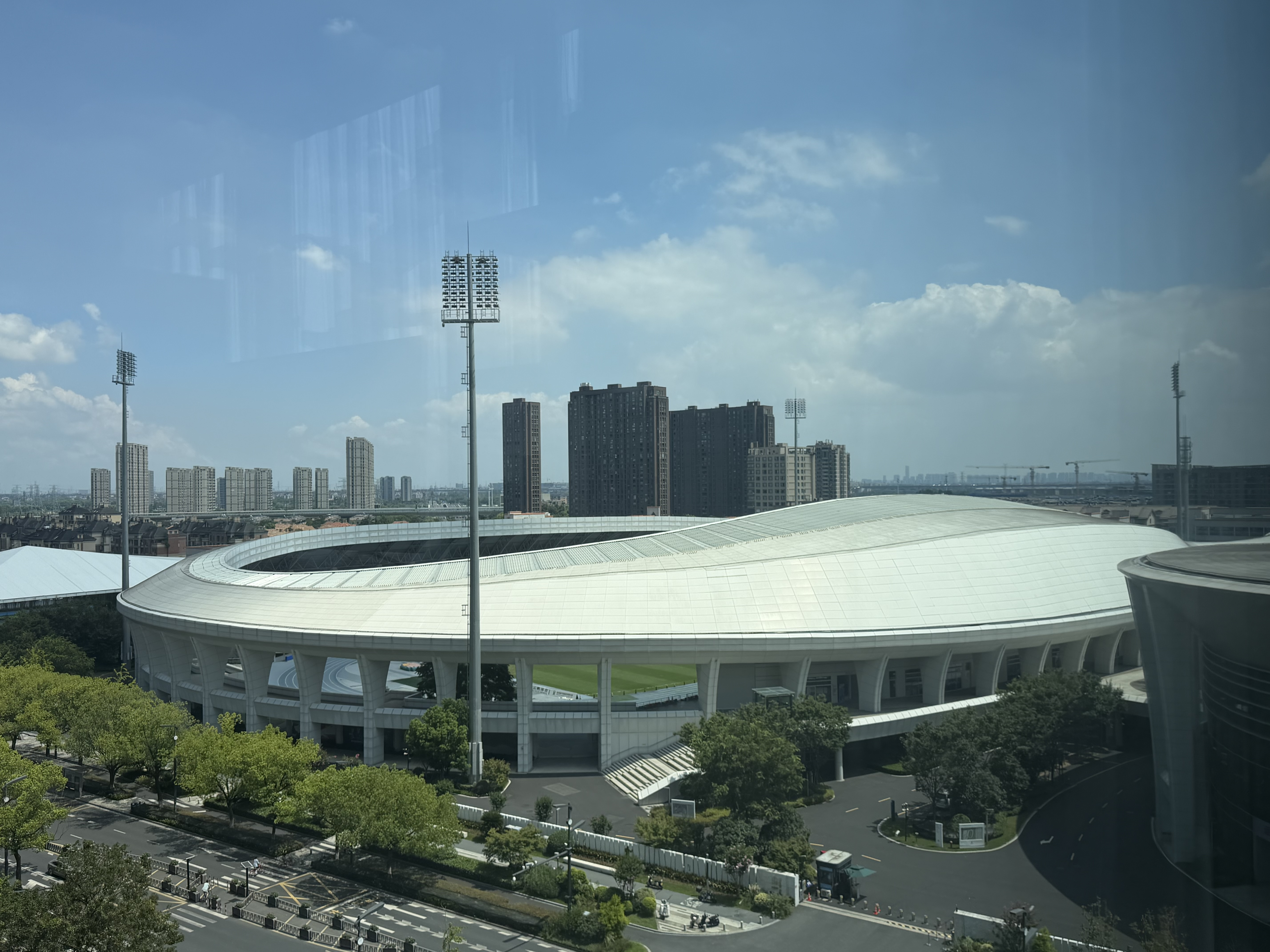
- Full name: Linping Sports Center Stadium
- Location: Hangzhou, China
- Capacity: 10,200
- Surface: Grass

Construction
- Reopened: 5 September 2021

Linping Sports Centre Stadium is a stadium in Hangzhou, China. It was a venue for the 19th Asian Games and has hosted some international football matches. It was reopened on 5 September 2021 and have a capacity of 10,200.
