= 2022 AFC Women's Asian Cup squads =

List of players competing at the 20th edition of the AFC Women's Asian Cup

This article lists the squads for the 2022 AFC Women's Asian Cup, the 20th edition of the AFC Women's Asian Cup. The tournament is a quadrennial women's international football tournament for national teams in Asia organised by the Asian Football Confederation, and was held in India from 20 January to 6 February 2022. In the tournament there were twelve national teams involved. Each national team registered a squad of 23 players.

The age listed for each player was on 20 January 2022, the first day of the tournament. The numbers of caps and goals listed for each player did not include any matches played after the start of tournament. The club listed is the club for which the player last played a competitive match prior to the tournament. The nationality for each club reflects the national association (not the league) to which the club is affiliated. A flag is included for coaches that are of a different nationality than their own national team.

== Group A ==
=== China PR ===
Coach: Shui Qingxia

The final squad was announced on 11 January 2022.

No.	Pos.	Player	Date of birth (age)	Caps	Goals	Club
1	GK	Zhu Yu	23 July 1997 (aged 24)	1	0	(Chinese Football Association) Wuhan Jianghan University
2	DF	Li Mengwen	28 March 1995 (aged 26)	10	0	(Chinese Football Association) Jiangsu
3	DF	Wang Xiaoxue	20 October 1994 (aged 27)	8	0	(Chinese Football Association) Jiangsu
4	DF	Li Jiayue	8 June 1990 (aged 31)	70	3	(Chinese Football Association) Shanghai Shengli
5	MF	Ma Jun	6 March 1989 (aged 32)	75	11	(Chinese Football Association) Wuhan Jianghan University
6	MF	Zhang Xin	23 May 1992 (aged 29)	12	2	(Chinese Football Association) Shanghai Shengli
7	MF	Wang Shuang	23 January 1995 (aged 26)	113	34	(Chinese Football Association) Wuhan Jianghan University
8	MF	Yao Wei	1 September 1997 (aged 24)	14	3	(Chinese Football Association) Wuhan Jianghan University
9	MF	Wang Yanwen	27 March 1999 (aged 22)	1	1	(Chinese Football Association) Beijing BG Phoenix
10	MF	Zhang Rui	17 January 1989 (aged 33)	153	30	(Chinese Football Association) Shandong Ticai
11	FW	Wang Shanshan (captain)	27 January 1990 (aged 31)	144	52	(Chinese Football Association) Tianjin Shengde
12	GK	Xu Huan	6 March 1999 (aged 22)	1	0	(Chinese Football Association) Jiangsu
13	MF	Yang Lina	13 April 1994 (aged 27)	23	2	(Chinese Football Association) Shanghai Shengli
14	MF	Lou Jiahui	26 May 1991 (aged 30)	110	5	(Chinese Football Association) Henan Jianye
15	MF	Wu Chengshu	26 August 1996 (aged 25)	6	0	(Chinese Football Association) Jiangsu
16	MF	Yao Lingwei	5 December 1995 (aged 26)	6	0	(Chinese Football Association) Jiangsu
17	MF	Liu Yanqiu	31 December 1995 (aged 26)	5	0	(Chinese Football Association) Wuhan Jianghan University
18	FW	Tang Jiali	16 March 1995 (aged 26)	70	28	(The Football Association) Tottenham Hotspur
19	FW	Zhang Linyan	16 January 2001 (aged 21)	3	0	(Chinese Football Association) Guangzhou
20	FW	Xiao Yuyi	10 January 1996 (aged 26)	30	4	(Chinese Football Association) Shanghai Shengli
21	FW	Li Ying	7 January 1993 (aged 29)	120	48	(Chinese Football Association) Shandong Ticai
22	GK	Zhao Lina	18 September 1991 (aged 30)	33	2	(Chinese Football Association) Shanghai Shengli
23	MF	Gao Chen	11 August 1992 (aged 29)	20	0	(Chinese Football Association) Changchun Dazhong Zhuoyue

=== Chinese Taipei ===
Coach: (Japan) Kazuo Echigo

The final squad was announced on 12 January 2022.

No.	Pos.	Player	Date of birth (age)	Caps	Goals	Club
1	GK	Tsai Ming-jung	23 January 1989 (aged 32)	17	0	(Japan Football Association) Fujizakura Yamanashi
2	MF	Chang Chi-lan	18 September 1996 (aged 25)	8	0	(Chinese Taipei Football Association) Taichung Blue Whale
3	FW	Lin Hsin-hui	6 February 2002 (aged 19)	8	4	(Chinese Taipei Football Association) Taipei Bravo
4	DF	Lai Wei-ju	31 July 1994 (aged 27)	8	0	(Chinese Taipei Football Association) Taichung Blue Whale
5	DF	Pan Shin-yu	3 May 1997 (aged 24)	3	0	(Chinese Taipei Football Association) Taichung Blue Whale
6	DF	Zhuo Li-ping	29 September 1999 (aged 22)	21	1	(Chinese Taipei Football Association) Hualien
7	MF	Chen Yen-ping	20 August 1991 (aged 30)	28	5	(Chinese Taipei Football Association) Hang Yuen
8	MF	Wang Hsiang-huei	28 September 1987 (aged 34)	35	3	(Chinese Taipei Football Association) Taipei Bravo
9	MF	Hsu Yi-yun	29 April 1997 (aged 24)	40	0	(Chinese Taipei Football Association) Taipei Bravo
10	MF	Lee Hsiu-chin	18 August 1992 (aged 29)	27	9	(Chinese Taipei Football Association) Kaoshiung Sunny Bank
11	MF	Lai Li-chin	15 August 1988 (aged 33)	20	8	(Chinese Taipei Football Association) Taichung Blue Whale
12	GK	Liao Wen-chi	8 August 1997 (aged 24)	14	0	(Chinese Taipei Football Association) Hang Yuen
13	MF	Pan Yen-hsin	18 February 1996 (aged 25)	10	0	(Chinese Taipei Football Association) Taipei Bravo
14	MF	Wu Kai-ching	14 November 1999 (aged 22)	4	0	(Chinese Taipei Football Association) Kaoshiung Sunny Bank
15	DF	Su Hsin-yun	20 November 1996 (aged 25)	19	0	(Chinese Taipei Football Association) Taipei Bravo
16	DF	Chang Su-hsin	4 October 1990 (aged 31)	15	0	(Chinese Taipei Football Association) Hang Yuen
17	MF	Ting Chi	2 June 1995 (aged 26)	20	3	(Chinese Taipei Football Association) Kaoshiung Sunny Bank
18	GK	Cheng Ssu-yu	25 September 1989 (aged 32)	10	0	(Japan Football Association) JEF United Chiba
19	FW	Su Yu-hsuan	21 February 2001 (aged 20)	8	1	(Chinese Taipei Football Association) Taichung Blue Whale
20	DF	Chen Ying-hui	5 October 1998 (aged 23)	13	0	(Chinese Taipei Football Association) Hang Yuen
21	GK	Wang Yu-ting	27 May 2001 (aged 20)	4	0	(Chinese Taipei Football Association) Taipei Bravo
22	MF	Ting Chia-ying	25 January 2002 (aged 19)	7	0	(Chinese Taipei Football Association) Taipei Bravo
23	DF	Chang Tzu-nuo	23 June 1999 (aged 22)	4	0	(Chinese Taipei Football Association) Taipei Bravo

=== India ===
Coach: (Sweden) Thomas Dennerby

The final squad was announced on 11 January 2022.

No.	Pos.	Player	Date of birth (age)	Caps	Goals	Club
1	GK	Aditi Chauhan	20 November 1992 (aged 29)	49	0	(All India Football Federation) Gokulam Kerala
2	DF	Ngangbam Sweety Devi	1 December 1999 (aged 22)	26	0	(All India Football Federation) KRYPHSA
3	DF	Manisa Panna	20 April 1991 (aged 30)	15	0	(All India Football Federation) Gokulam Kerala
4	DF	Loitongbam Ashalata Devi (captain)	3 July 1993 (aged 28)	64	4	(All India Football Federation) Sethu
5	DF	Hemam Shilky Devi	23 November 2005 (aged 16)	2	0	(All India Football Federation) Young Welfare
6	MF	Yumnam Kamala Devi	4 March 1992 (aged 29)	51	33	(All India Football Federation) Gokulam Kerala
7	MF	Nongmaithem Ratanbala Devi	2 December 1999 (aged 22)	29	14	(All India Football Federation) KRYPHSA
8	FW	Sanju Yadav	12 September 1997 (aged 24)	33	7	(All India Football Federation) Gokulam Kerala
9	MF	Anju Tamang	22 December 1995 (aged 26)	28	2	(All India Football Federation) KRYPHSA
10	FW	Pyari Xaxa	18 May 1997 (aged 24)	8	4	(All India Football Federation) Rising Students
11	FW	Grace Dangmei	5 February 1996 (aged 25)	43	12	(All India Football Federation) Gokulam Kerala
12	MF	Indumathi Kathiresan	5 June 1994 (aged 27)	40	10	(All India Football Federation) Sethu
13	MF	Sandhiya Ranganathan	20 May 1996 (aged 25)	10	8	(All India Football Federation) Sethu
14	MF	Naorem Priyangka Devi	9 April 2003 (aged 18)	0	0	(All India Football Federation) Eastern Sporting Union
15	FW	Renu Gour	16 January 2001 (aged 21)	2	0	(All India Football Federation) Kickstart
16	DF	Manisha Kalyan	27 November 2001 (aged 20)	15	3	(All India Football Federation) Gokulam Kerala
17	DF	Dalima Chhibber	30 August 1997 (aged 24)	29	2	(All India Football Federation) Gokulam Kerala
18	FW	Mariyammal Balamurugan	14 April 2003 (aged 18)	2	0	(All India Football Federation) Sethu
19	GK	Sowmiya Narayanasamy	25 July 2000 (aged 21)	1	0	(All India Football Federation) Sethu
20	MF	Karthika Angamuthu	21 November 1999 (aged 22)	1	0	(All India Football Federation) Sethu
21	DF	Ritu Rani	25 May 1997 (aged 24)	2	0	(All India Football Federation) Gokulam Kerala
22	FW	Sumati Kumari	15 February 2004 (aged 17)	0	0	(All India Football Federation) Jharkhand
23	GK	Maibam Linthoingambi Devi	2 February 1999 (aged 22)	5	0	(All India Football Federation) KRYPHSA

=== Iran ===
Coach: Maryam Irandoost

The final squad was announced on 12 January 2022.

No.	Pos.	Player	Date of birth (age)	Caps	Goals	Club
1	GK	Zohreh Koudaei	24 November 1989 (aged 32)	30	0	(Football Federation Islamic Republic of Iran) Zob Ahan
2	DF	Fatemeh Amineh	3 June 1997 (aged 24)	12	0	(Football Federation Islamic Republic of Iran) Shahrdari Sirjan
3	DF	Hadieh Kor	25 February 1993 (aged 28)	0	0	(Football Federation Islamic Republic of Iran) Malavan
4	DF	Melika Motevalli	6 May 1998 (aged 23)	15	2	(Football Federation Islamic Republic of Iran) Shahrdari Sirjan
5	DF	Ghazaleh Banitalebi	14 January 2002 (aged 20)	5	0	(Football Federation Islamic Republic of Iran) Zarebatrie
6	MF	Zahra Sarbali	13 August 1993 (aged 28)	21	0	(Football Federation Islamic Republic of Iran) Bam Khatoon
7	FW	Afsaneh Chatrenoor	14 April 1998 (aged 23)	16	0	(Football Federation Islamic Republic of Iran) Shahrdari Sirjan
8	DF	Behnaz Taherkhani (captain)	22 May 1995 (aged 26)	20	3	(Football Federation Islamic Republic of Iran) Bam Khatoon
9	FW	Sara Ghomi	20 August 1987 (aged 34)	52	17	(Football Federation Islamic Republic of Iran) Heyat Alborz
10	MF	Sara Zohrabi	13 November 1996 (aged 25)	25	6	(Football Federation Islamic Republic of Iran) Sepahan
11	MF	Samaneh Chahkandi	28 March 1989 (aged 32)	21	3	(Football Federation Islamic Republic of Iran) Bam Khatoon
12	GK	Maryam Yektaei	19 June 1993 (aged 28)	32	0	(Turkish Football Federation) Beşiktaş
13	MF	Yasaman Farmani	12 February 1995 (aged 26)	8	0	(Royal Belgian Football Association) Charleroi
14	MF	Elham Farahmand	12 September 1993 (aged 28)	10	0	(Football Federation Islamic Republic of Iran) Zob Ahan
15	DF	Zohreh Jalali	16 February 1999 (aged 22)	0	0	(Football Federation Islamic Republic of Iran) Zarebatrie
16	MF	Zahra Masoumi	18 June 2004 (aged 17)	3	0	(Football Federation Islamic Republic of Iran) Heyat Alborz
17	FW	Negin Zandi	20 January 2004 (aged 18)	4	1	(Football Federation Islamic Republic of Iran) Bam Khatoon
18	MF	Melika Mohammadi	28 March 2000 (aged 21)	6	0	(Football Federation Islamic Republic of Iran) Bam Khatoon
19	DF	Fatemeh Adeli	16 July 1995 (aged 26)	22	0	(Football Federation Islamic Republic of Iran) Sepahan
20	FW	Hajar Dabbaghi	22 March 1999 (aged 22)	16	6	(Football Federation Islamic Republic of Iran) Sepahan
21	MF	Marzieh Nikkhah	25 November 1992 (aged 29)	3	0	(Football Federation Islamic Republic of Iran) Sepahan
22	GK	Arefeh Kazemi	26 February 1998 (aged 23)	1	0	(Football Federation Islamic Republic of Iran) Shahrdari Sirjan
23	MF	Sana Sadeghi	12 June 2000 (aged 21)	7	1	(Football Federation Islamic Republic of Iran) Sepahan

== Group B ==
=== Australia ===
Coach: (Sweden) Tony Gustavsson

An initial 21-player squad was announced on 8 January 2022, along with four players who joined the travelling squad out of which two would be selected for the final squad. At the end of the pre-tournament training camp, Holly McNamara and Cortnee Vine were added to the final squad.

No.	Pos.	Player	Date of birth (age)	Caps	Goals	Club
1	GK	Lydia Williams	13 May 1988 (aged 33)	95	0	(The Football Association) Arsenal
2	DF	Courtney Nevin	12 February 2002 (aged 19)	7	0	(Football Australia) Melbourne Victory
3	MF	Aivi Luik	18 March 1985 (aged 36)	33	0	(Italian Football Federation) Pomigliano
4	DF	Clare Polkinghorne	1 February 1989 (aged 32)	138	13	(Swedish Football Association) Vittsjö GIK
5	DF	Cortnee Vine	9 April 1998 (aged 23)	0	0	(Football Australia) Sydney FC
6	MF	Clare Wheeler	14 January 1998 (aged 24)	5	0	(Danish Football Association) Fortuna Hjørring
7	DF	Steph Catley	26 January 1994 (aged 27)	96	3	(The Football Association) Arsenal
8	DF	Charlotte Grant	20 September 2001 (aged 20)	3	0	(Swedish Football Association) FC Rosengård
9	FW	Caitlin Foord	11 November 1994 (aged 27)	95	21	(The Football Association) Arsenal
10	MF	Emily van Egmond	12 July 1993 (aged 28)	112	24	(Football Australia) Newcastle Jets
11	MF	Mary Fowler	14 February 2003 (aged 18)	20	5	(French Football Federation) Montpellier
12	GK	Teagan Micah	20 October 1997 (aged 24)	8	0	(Swedish Football Association) FC Rosengård
13	MF	Tameka Yallop	16 June 1991 (aged 30)	101	11	(The Football Association) West Ham United
14	DF	Alanna Kennedy	21 January 1995 (aged 26)	102	8	(The Football Association) Manchester City
15	FW	Emily Gielnik	13 May 1992 (aged 29)	50	11	(The Football Association) Aston Villa
16	FW	Hayley Raso	5 September 1994 (aged 27)	58	6	(The Football Association) Manchester City
17	FW	Kyah Simon	25 June 1991 (aged 30)	105	27	(The Football Association) Tottenham Hotspur
18	GK	Mackenzie Arnold	25 February 1994 (aged 27)	27	0	(The Football Association) West Ham United
19	MF	Kyra Cooney-Cross	15 February 2002 (aged 19)	14	0	(Football Australia) Melbourne Victory
20	FW	Sam Kerr (captain)	10 September 1993 (aged 28)	104	49	(The Football Association) Chelsea
21	DF	Ellie Carpenter	28 April 2000 (aged 21)	54	1	(French Football Federation) Lyon
22	FW	Holly McNamara	23 January 2003 (aged 18)	0	0	(Football Australia) Melbourne City
23	FW	Remy Siemsen	10 November 1999 (aged 22)	2	0	(Football Australia) Sydney FC

=== Indonesia ===
Coach: Rudy Eka Priyambada

The final squad was announced on 11 January 2022.

No.	Pos.	Player	Date of birth (age)	Caps	Goals	Club
1	GK	Nurhalimah	14 August 1997 (aged 24)	0	0	(Football Association of Indonesia) Asprov West Java
2	DF	Remini Chere	9 October 2000 (aged 21)	0	0	(Football Association of Indonesia) Asprov Papua
3	DF	Rosdilah Nurrohmah	3 October 1999 (aged 22)	0	0	(Football Association of Indonesia) Asprov West Java
4	DF	Shalika Aurelia	1 August 2003 (aged 18)	8	0	(Football Association of Indonesia) Persija Jakarta
5	DF	Sabrina Mutiara	6 December 1999 (aged 22)	6	0	(Football Association of Indonesia) Arema
6	DF	Pani Oktavianti	12 January 2002 (aged 20)	0	0	(Football Association of Indonesia) Asprov West Java
7	FW	Octavianti Dwi	25 October 1998 (aged 23)	11	1	(Football Association of Indonesia) Persiba Balikpapan
8	MF	Maulina Novryliani	14 November 1987 (aged 34)	3	0	(Football Association of Indonesia) Persija Jakarta
9	DF	Ade Mustikiana (captain)	3 October 1999 (aged 22)	25	2	(Football Association of Indonesia) Asprov Bangka Belitung
10	MF	Rani Mulyasari	4 March 1993 (aged 28)	8	1	(Football Association of Indonesia) Persiba Balikpapan
11	FW	Baiq Amiatun	16 July 1991 (aged 30)	8	3	(Football Association of Indonesia) Asprov West Nusa Tenggara
12	FW	Zahra Muzdalifah	4 April 2001 (aged 20)	19	3	(Football Association of Indonesia) Persija Jakarta
13	FW	Marsela Yuliana	10 May 2003 (aged 18)	0	0	(Football Association of Indonesia) Asprov Papua
14	DF	Diah Tri Lestari	7 March 1997 (aged 24)	0	0	(Football Association of Indonesia) Asprov West Java
15	MF	Helsya Maeisyaroh	7 May 2005 (aged 16)	2	0	(Football Association of Indonesia) Asprov West Java
16	FW	Carla Bio	9 August 2002 (aged 19)	0	0	(Football Association of Indonesia) Persija Jakarta
17	MF	Vivi Oktavia	7 March 1997 (aged 24)	21	2	(Football Association of Indonesia) Asprov Bangka Belitung
18	DF	Tia Darti Septiawati	24 September 1993 (aged 28)	4	0	(Football Association of Indonesia) Asprov West Java
19	GK	Fani Supriyanto	30 May 2004 (aged 17)	2	0	(Football Association of Indonesia) Asprov Central Java
20	MF	Viny Silfianus	3 July 2002 (aged 19)	2	0	(Football Association of Indonesia) Persija Jakarta
21	GK	Riska Aprilia	19 April 1999 (aged 22)	0	0	(Football Association of Indonesia) PSS Sleman
22	FW	Insyafadya Salsabillah	10 March 2002 (aged 19)	1	0	(Football Association of Indonesia) Asprov East Java
23	DF	Reva Octaviani	3 July 2002 (aged 19)	0	0	(Football Association of Indonesia) Asprov West Java

=== Philippines ===
Coach: (Australia) Alen Stajcic

The final squad was announced on 11 January 2022.

No.	Pos.	Player	Date of birth (age)	Caps	Goals	Club
1	GK	Inna Palacios	8 February 1994 (aged 27)	47	0	(Philippine Football Federation) Kaya–Iloilo
2	DF	Malea Cesar	9 December 2003 (aged 18)	0	0	(United States Soccer Federation) Sunset HS Apollos
3	DF	Dominique Randle	10 December 1994 (aged 27)	0	0	(United States Soccer Federation) USC Trojans
4	DF	Tara Shelton	26 June 2001 (aged 20)	6	0	(Philippine Football Federation) DLSU Lady Booters
5	DF	Hali Long	21 January 1995 (aged 26)	41	11	(Philippine Football Federation) Kaya–Iloilo
6	MF	Tahnai Annis (captain)	20 June 1989 (aged 32)	6	2	(Football Association of Iceland) Þór/KA
7	MF	Camille Rodriguez	27 December 1994 (aged 27)	31	8	(Philippine Football Federation) Kaya–Iloilo
8	FW	Chandler McDaniel	4 February 1998 (aged 23)	2	1	(United States Soccer Federation) Milwaukee Panthers
9	MF	Jessica Miclat	8 October 1998 (aged 23)	6	0	(Cyprus Football Association) Aris Limassol
10	MF	Ryley Bugay	23 January 1996 (aged 25)	6	0	(German Football Association) 1. FC Saarbrücken
11	MF	Anicka Castañeda	16 December 1999 (aged 22)	11	2	(Philippine Football Federation) DLSU Lady Booters
12	MF	Sara Castañeda	5 December 1996 (aged 25)	40	10	(Philippine Football Federation) DLSU Lady Booters
13	DF	Morgan Brown	20 October 1995 (aged 26)	4	0	(United States Soccer Federation) Santa Clara Broncos
14	DF	Isabella Flanigan	22 February 2005 (aged 16)	0	0	(United States Soccer Federation) Montverde Academy
15	MF	Carleigh Frilles	11 April 2002 (aged 19)	0	0	(United States Soccer Federation) Coastal Carolina Chanticleers
16	DF	Sofia Harrison	16 February 1999 (aged 22)	3	0	(United States Soccer Federation) Coppermine United
17	MF	Keanne Alamo	17 December 2003 (aged 18)	0	0	(United States Soccer Federation) Oral Roberts Golden Eagles
18	FW	Sarina Bolden	30 June 1996 (aged 25)	8	4	(Japan Football Association) AS Elfen
19	DF	Eva Madarang	13 September 1997 (aged 24)	17	7	(Royal Spanish Football Federation) Pozoalbense
20	FW	Quinley Quezada	7 April 1997 (aged 24)	18	9	(Japan Football Association) JEF United Chiba
21	MF	Katrina Guillou	13 December 1993 (aged 28)	0	0	(Swedish Football Association) Piteå IF
22	GK	Kiara Fontanilla	1 July 2000 (aged 21)	0	0	(United States Soccer Federation) Eastern Oregon Mountaineers
23	GK	Olivia McDaniel	14 October 1997 (aged 24)	1	0	(United States Soccer Federation) Milwaukee Panthers

=== Thailand ===
Coach: (Japan) Miyo Okamoto

The final squad was announced on 12 January 2022.

No.	Pos.	Player	Date of birth (age)	Caps	Goals	Club
1	GK	Waraporn Boonsing	16 February 1990 (aged 31)	155	0	(Football Association of Thailand) BG Bundit Asia
2	DF	Kanjanaporn Saenkhun	18 July 1996 (aged 25)	24	0	(Football Association of Thailand) BG Bundit Asia
3	MF	Irravadee Makris	20 January 1992 (aged 30)	5	4	(Football Association of Thailand) MH Nakhon Si Lady
4	DF	Phornphirun Philawan	8 April 1999 (aged 22)	10	0	(Football Association of Thailand) BG Bundit Asia
5	DF	Amornrat Utchai	4 September 1994 (aged 27)	1	0	(Football Association of Thailand) BG Bundit Asia
6	MF	Pikul Khueanpet	20 September 1988 (aged 33)	115	2	(Football Association of Thailand) BG Bundit Asia
7	MF	Silawan Intamee (captain)	22 January 1994 (aged 27)	85	15	(Football Association of Thailand) Chonburi FC
8	MF	Nipawan Panyosuk	15 March 1995 (aged 26)	20	2	(Football Association of Thailand) Chonburi FC
9	DF	Warunee Phetwiset	13 December 1990 (aged 31)	100	0	(Football Association of Thailand) MH Nakhon Si Lady
10	DF	Sunisa Srangthaisong	6 May 1988 (aged 33)	152	15	(Football Association of Thailand) BG Bundit Asia
11	FW	Jaruwan Chaiyarak	23 April 1990 (aged 31)	10	3	(Football Association of Thailand) Chonburi FC
12	MF	Nutwadee Pram-nak	9 October 2000 (aged 21)	12	2	(Football Association of Thailand) Bangkok
13	FW	Kanyanat Chetthabutr	24 September 1999 (aged 22)	17	7	(Football Association of Thailand) BG Bundit Asia
14	FW	Saowalak Pengngam	30 November 1996 (aged 25)	20	10	(Football Association of Thailand) Chonburi FC
15	MF	Orapin Waenngoen	7 October 1995 (aged 26)	22	6	(Football Association of Thailand) BG Bundit Asia
16	DF	Uraiporn Yongkul	17 August 1998 (aged 23)	1	0	(Football Association of Thailand) BG Bundit Asia
17	FW	Taneekarn Dangda	15 December 1992 (aged 29)	71	19	(Football Association of Thailand) MH Nakhon Si Lady
18	GK	Chotmanee Thongmongkol	12 January 1999 (aged 23)	1	0	(Football Association of Thailand) Chonburi FC
19	FW	Pitsamai Sornsai	19 January 1989 (aged 33)	120	11	(Chinese Taipei Football Association) Taichung Blue Whale
20	MF	Wilaiporn Boothduang	25 June 1987 (aged 34)	98	28	(Football Association of Thailand) Royal Thai Air Force
21	MF	Chatchawan Rodthong	22 June 2002 (aged 19)	2	0	(Football Association of Thailand) Bangkok
22	GK	Tiffany Sornpao	22 May 1998 (aged 23)	4	0	(Football Association of Iceland) Keflavík
23	FW	Miranda Nild	1 April 1997 (aged 24)	20	15	(Swedish Football Association) Kristianstads

== Group C ==
=== Japan ===
Coach: Futoshi Ikeda

The final squad was announced on 7 January 2022.

No.	Pos.	Player	Date of birth (age)	Caps	Goals	Club
1	GK	Sakiko Ikeda	8 September 1992 (aged 29)	20	0	(Japan Football Association) Urawa Reds
2	DF	Risa Shimizu	15 June 1996 (aged 25)	44	1	(Japan Football Association) Tokyo Verdy Beleza
3	DF	Moeka Minami	7 December 1998 (aged 23)	21	1	(Japan Football Association) Urawa Reds
4	DF	Saki Kumagai (captain)	17 October 1990 (aged 31)	120	1	(German Football Association) Bayern Munich
5	DF	Shiori Miyake	13 October 1995 (aged 26)	26	0	(Japan Football Association) INAC Kobe Leonessa
6	DF	Asato Miyagawa	24 February 1998 (aged 23)	18	0	(Japan Football Association) Tokyo Verdy Beleza
7	MF	Rin Sumida	12 January 1996 (aged 26)	24	0	(Japan Football Association) MyNavi Sendai
8	MF	Hikaru Naomoto	3 March 1994 (aged 27)	21	0	(Japan Football Association) Urawa Reds
9	FW	Yuika Sugasawa	5 October 1990 (aged 31)	79	24	(Japan Football Association) Urawa Reds
10	FW	Mana Iwabuchi	18 March 1993 (aged 28)	83	37	(The Football Association) Arsenal
11	FW	Mina Tanaka	28 April 1994 (aged 27)	54	25	(Japan Football Association) INAC Kobe Leonessa
12	DF	Ruka Norimatsu	30 January 1996 (aged 25)	3	0	(Japan Football Association) Omiya Ardija
13	MF	Jun Endō	24 May 2000 (aged 21)	22	1	(United States Soccer Federation) Angel City
14	MF	Yui Hasegawa	29 January 1997 (aged 24)	53	11	(The Football Association) West Ham United
15	MF	Fūka Nagano	9 March 1999 (aged 22)	3	0	(Japan Football Association) MyNavi Sendai
16	MF	Honoka Hayashi	19 May 1998 (aged 23)	11	0	(Swedish Football Association) AIK
17	MF	Yui Narumiya	22 February 1995 (aged 26)	1	0	(Japan Football Association) INAC Kobe Leonessa
18	GK	Ayaka Yamashita	29 September 1995 (aged 26)	44	0	(Japan Football Association) INAC Kobe Leonessa
19	FW	Riko Ueki	30 July 1999 (aged 22)	6	0	(Japan Football Association) Tokyo Verdy Beleza
20	DF	Hana Takahashi	19 February 2000 (aged 21)	5	0	(Japan Football Association) Urawa Reds
21	GK	Momoko Tanaka	17 March 2000 (aged 21)	1	0	(Japan Football Association) Tokyo Verdy Beleza
22	DF	Saori Takarada	27 December 1999 (aged 22)	10	1	(Swedish Football Association) Linköping
23	MF	Hinata Miyazawa	28 November 1999 (aged 22)	4	0	(Japan Football Association) MyNavi Sendai

=== Myanmar ===
Coach: Tin Myint Aung

The final squad was announced on 13 January 2022.

No.	Pos.	Player	Date of birth (age)	Caps	Goals	Club
1	GK	May Zin Nwe	7 March 1995 (aged 26)	12	0	(Myanmar Football Federation) Myawady
2	DF	Aye Aye Moe	4 February 1995 (aged 26)	25	0	(Myanmar Football Federation) Myawady
3	DF	Chit Chit	18 October 1996 (aged 25)	15	1	(Myanmar Football Federation) Myawady
4	DF	Khin Myo Win	10 February 1999 (aged 22)	1	0	(Myanmar Football Federation) ISPE
5	DF	Phyu Phyu Win	1 December 2004 (aged 17)	6	0	(Myanmar Football Federation) Myawady
6	MF	Thine Thine Yu	27 September 1995 (aged 26)	26	0	(Myanmar Football Federation) ISPE
7	FW	Win Theingi Tun	1 February 1995 (aged 26)	60	56	(All India Football Federation) Gokulam Kerala
8	FW	San Thaw Thaw	2 January 2001 (aged 21)	7	3	(Myanmar Football Federation) Myawady
9	MF	Khin Mo Mo Tun	3 June 1999 (aged 22)	35	3	(Myanmar Football Federation) Thitsar Arman
10	MF	Khin Marlar Tun (captain)	21 May 1988 (aged 33)	8	4	(Myanmar Football Federation) ISPE
11	FW	Khin Moe Wai	16 December 1989 (aged 32)	63	33	(Myanmar Football Federation) Thitsar Arman
12	DF	Nant Zu Zu Htet	26 September 2000 (aged 21)	0	0	(Myanmar Football Federation) Myawady
13	MF	Hnin Pwint Aye	26 January 2004 (aged 17)	0	0	(Myanmar Football Federation) ISPE
14	MF	Win Win	12 February 2003 (aged 18)	0	0	(Myanmar Football Federation) YREO
15	DF	Zune Yu Ya Oo	12 February 2001 (aged 20)	2	0	(Myanmar Football Federation) Myawady
16	MF	Naw Htet Htet Wai	30 July 2000 (aged 21)	1	0	(Myanmar Football Federation) Myawady
17	FW	Myat Noe Khin	24 July 2003 (aged 18)	6	2	(Myanmar Football Federation) YREO
18	GK	Zu Latt Nadi	22 December 2000 (aged 21)	0	0	(Myanmar Football Federation) Myawady
19	FW	July Kyaw	21 July 1999 (aged 22)	30	10	(Myanmar Football Federation) Thitsar Arman
20	MF	Nu Nu	1 April 1999 (aged 22)	25	5	(Myanmar Football Federation) ISPE
21	DF	Khin Than Wai	2 November 1995 (aged 26)	65	3	(Myanmar Football Federation) Myawady
22	DF	Ei Ei Kyaw	1 April 2002 (aged 19)	0	0	(Myanmar Football Federation) ISPE
23	GK	Khine Zar Win	26 June 1999 (aged 22)	0	0	(Myanmar Football Federation) ISPE

=== South Korea ===
Coach: (England) Colin Bell

The final squad was announced on 10 January 2022.

No.	Pos.	Player	Date of birth (age)	Caps	Goals	Club
1	GK	Yoon Young-geul	28 October 1987 (aged 34)	22	0	(Korea Football Association) Gyeongju KHNP
2	DF	Choo Hyo-joo	29 July 2000 (aged 21)	11	3	(Korea Football Association) Suwon UDC
3	FW	Seo Ji-youn	20 May 1995 (aged 26)	2	0	(Korea Football Association) Gyeongju KHNP
4	DF	Shim Seo-yeon	15 April 1989 (aged 32)	64	2	(Korea Football Association) Sejong Sportstoto
5	DF	Hong Hye-ji	25 August 1996 (aged 25)	32	1	(Korea Football Association) Incheon Hyundai Steel Red Angels
6	DF	Lim Seon-joo	27 November 1990 (aged 31)	86	6	(Korea Football Association) Incheon Hyundai Steel Red Angels
7	MF	Lee Min-a	8 November 1991 (aged 30)	65	15	(Korea Football Association) Incheon Hyundai Steel Red Angels
8	MF	Cho So-hyun	24 June 1988 (aged 33)	126	20	(The Football Association) Tottenham Hotspur
9	FW	Yeo Min-ji	27 April 1993 (aged 28)	49	15	(Korea Football Association) Gyeongju KHNP
10	MF	Ji So-yun (captain)	21 February 1991 (aged 30)	125	61	(The Football Association) Chelsea
11	FW	Choe Yu-ri	16 September 1994 (aged 27)	34	5	(Korea Football Association) Incheon Hyundai Steel Red Angels
12	MF	Kwon Hah-nul	7 March 1988 (aged 33)	104	15	(Korea Football Association) Mungyeong Sangmu
13	MF	Lee Geum-min	7 April 1994 (aged 27)	64	18	(The Football Association) Brighton & Hove Albion
14	MF	Cho Mi-jin	4 April 2001 (aged 20)	1	0	(Korea Football Association) Sejong Korea University
15	MF	Park Ye-eun	17 October 1996 (aged 25)	10	3	(Korea Football Association) Gyeongju KHNP
16	DF	Jang Sel-gi	31 May 1994 (aged 27)	73	12	(Korea Football Association) Incheon Hyundai Steel Red Angels
17	MF	Lee Young-ju	22 April 1992 (aged 29)	44	2	(Royal Spanish Football Federation) Madrid CFF
18	GK	Kim Jung-mi	16 October 1984 (aged 37)	120	0	(Korea Football Association) Incheon Hyundai Steel Red Angels
19	GK	Kang Ga-ae	10 December 1990 (aged 31)	14	0	(Korea Football Association) Sejong Sportstoto
20	DF	Kim Hye-ri	25 June 1990 (aged 31)	93	1	(Korea Football Association) Incheon Hyundai Steel Red Angels
21	MF	Kim Seong-mi	2 April 1997 (aged 24)	2	0	(Korea Football Association) Sejong Sportstoto
22	MF	Lee Jeong-min	11 November 2000 (aged 21)	1	0	(Korea Football Association) Boeun Sangmu
23	FW	Son Hwa-yeon	15 March 1997 (aged 24)	30	7	(Korea Football Association) Incheon Hyundai Steel Red Angels

=== Vietnam ===
Coach: Mai Đức Chung

The final squad was announced on 5 January 2022.

No.	Pos.	Player	Date of birth (age)	Caps	Goals	Club
1	GK	Lại Thị Tuyết	27 April 1993 (aged 28)	2	0	(Vietnam Football Federation) Phong Phú Hà Nam
2	DF	Lương Thị Thu Thương	1 May 2000 (aged 21)	5	0	(Vietnam Football Federation) Than Khoáng Sản
3	DF	Chương Thị Kiều	19 August 1995 (aged 26)	30	1	(Vietnam Football Federation) Hồ Chí Minh City
4	DF	Trần Thị Thu Thảo	15 January 1993 (aged 29)			(Vietnam Football Federation) Hồ Chí Minh City
5	DF	Trần Thị Duyên	28 December 2000 (aged 21)	1	0	(Vietnam Football Federation) Phong Phú Hà Nam
6	MF	Phạm Hoàng Quỳnh	20 December 1992 (aged 29)	28	6	(Vietnam Football Federation) Phong Phú Hà Nam
7	MF	Nguyễn Thị Tuyết Dung (vice-captain)	13 December 1993 (aged 28)	51	24	(Vietnam Football Federation) Phong Phú Hà Nam
8	MF	Trần Thị Thùy Trang	8 August 1988 (aged 33)	31	3	(Vietnam Football Federation) Hồ Chí Minh City
9	FW	Huỳnh Như (captain)	28 November 1991 (aged 30)	50	48	(Vietnam Football Federation) Hồ Chí Minh City
10	FW	Nguyễn Thị Tuyết Ngân	10 February 2000 (aged 21)	5	1	(Vietnam Football Federation) Hồ Chí Minh City
11	MF	Thái Thị Thảo	12 February 1995 (aged 26)	32	11	(Vietnam Football Federation) Hà Nội
12	FW	Phạm Hải Yến	9 November 1994 (aged 27)	44	30	(Vietnam Football Federation) Hà Nội
13	DF	Lê Thị Diễm My	6 March 1994 (aged 27)	0	0	(Vietnam Football Federation) Than Khoáng Sản
14	GK	Trần Thị Kim Thanh	18 September 1993 (aged 28)	27	0	(Vietnam Football Federation) Hồ Chí Minh City
15	DF	Phạm Thị Tươi	26 June 1993 (aged 28)	41	0	(Vietnam Football Federation) Phong Phú Hà Nam
16	MF	Dương Thị Vân	20 December 1994 (aged 27)	49	13	(Vietnam Football Federation) Than Khoáng Sản
17	MF	Trần Thị Phương Thảo	15 January 1993 (aged 29)	35	11	(Vietnam Football Federation) Hồ Chí Minh City
18	MF	Nguyễn Thị Vạn	10 January 1997 (aged 25)	29	11	(Vietnam Football Federation) Than Khoáng Sản
19	FW	Nguyễn Thị Thanh Nhã	25 September 2001 (aged 20)	2	2	(Vietnam Football Federation) Hồ Chí Minh City
20	GK	Khổng Thị Hằng	10 October 1993 (aged 28)	22	0	(Vietnam Football Federation) Than Khoáng Sản
21	MF	Ngân Thị Vạn Sự	29 April 2001 (aged 20)	4	1	(Vietnam Football Federation) Hà Nội
22	MF	Nguyễn Thị Mỹ Anh	4 March 2002 (aged 19)	0	0	(Vietnam Football Federation) Hồ Chí Minh City
23	MF	Nguyễn Thị Bích Thùy	1 May 1994 (aged 27)	30	10	(Vietnam Football Federation) Hồ Chí Minh City

== Player representation ==
Statistics are per the beginning of the competition.

=== By club ===
Clubs with 5 or more players represented are listed.

Players	Club
10	(Myanmar) Myawady, (Vietnam) Hồ Chí Minh City
9	(India) Gokulam Kerala, (Thailand) BG Bundit Asia
8	(Chinese Taipei) Taipei Bravo, (South Korea) Incheon Hyundai Steel Red Angels
7	(Indonesia) Asprov Jawa Barat, (Myanmar) ISPE
6	(Chinese Taipei) Taichung Blue Whale, (India) Sethu
5	(China) Jiangsu, (China) Shanghai Shengli, (China) Wuhan Jianghan University, (Indonesia) Persija, (Iran) Bam Khatoon, (Iran) Sepahan, (Japan) Urawa Reds, (Thailand) Chonburi FC, (Vietnam) Phong Phú Hà Nam, (Vietnam) Than Khoáng Sản

=== By club nationality ===
Players	Clubs
24	India
23	Indonesia, Vietnam
22	China, Chinese Taipei, Myanmar
21	Iran, Japan
20	Thailand
19	South Korea
16	England
11	United States
7	Sweden
6	Australia, Philippines
2	France, Germany, Iceland, Spain
1	Belgium, Cyprus, Denmark, Italy, Turkey

=== By club federation ===
Players	Federation
229	AFC
36	UEFA
11	CONCACAF

=== By representatives of domestic league ===
National squad	Players
India	23
Indonesia	23
Vietnam	23
China	22
Myanmar	22
Chinese Taipei	21
Iran	21
Thailand	20
South Korea	19
Japan	17
Australia	6
Philippines	6
