= 2022 AFC Women's Asian Cup Group A =

Group A is the first of three groups of the 2022 AFC Women's Asian Cup that took place from 20 to 26 February 2022. The group competition consists of China PR, Chinese Taipei, hosts India and Iran. The top two teams automatically qualify for the top eight knockout stage, while third place is comparatively evaluated to other third-placed teams based on the football ranking system for the last two berths. The two teams that advanced are China PR and Chinese Taipei. Although Iran finished third in this set, they failed to make the quarter-finals as they are comparatively last to the other third-place teams.

== Teams ==
| Draw position | Team | Pot | Federation | Method of qualification | Date of qualification | Finals appearance | Last appearance | Previous best performance | FIFA Rankings | | | | | | | | | | |
|---|---|---|---|---|---|---|---|---|---|---|---|---|---|---|---|---|---|---|---|
| Draw position | Team | Pot | Federation | Method of qualification | Date of qualification | Finals appearance | Last appearance | Previous best performance | FIFA Rankings | A1 | India | 1 | SAFF | Hosts | 5 June 2020 | 9th | 2003 | Runners-up (1979, 1983) | 55 |
| A2 | China | 2 | EAFF | 2018 third place | 28 January 2021 | 15th | 2018 | Champions (1986, 1989, 1991, 1993, 1995, 1997, 1999, 2006) | 19 | | | | | | | | | | |
| A3 | Chinese Taipei | 3 | EAFF | Group A winners | 24 October 2021 | 14th | 2008 | Champions (1977, 1979, 1981) | 39 | | | | | | | | | | |
| A4 | Iran | 4 | CAFA | Group G winners | 25 September 2021 | 1st | N/A | Debut | 70 | | | | | | | | | | |

== Standings ==
| Pos | Team | Pld | W | D | L | GF | GA | GD | Pts | Qualification |
|---|---|---|---|---|---|---|---|---|---|---|
| 1 | China | 2 | 2 | 0 | 0 | 11 | 0 | +11 | 6 | Knockout stage |
| 2 | Chinese Taipei | 2 | 1 | 0 | 1 | 5 | 4 | +1 | 3 | Knockout stage |
| 3 | Iran | 2 | 0 | 0 | 2 | 0 | 12 | −12 | 0 | |
| 4 | India (H) | 0 | 0 | 0 | 0 | 0 | 0 | 0 | 0 | Withdrew (Note: India failed to name the required 13 players and were unable to play their match of the group stage against Chinese Taipei due to them having only fewer than 13 players left with the remaining team members testing positive for COVID-19. They were considered to have withdrawn from the competition, and all previous matches played by them shall be considered "null and void" and would not be considered in determining the final group rankings.) |

Source: AFC
Rules for classification: Group stage tiebreakers
(H) Hosts

== Matches ==
=== China PR vs Chinese Taipei ===
20 January 2022
15:30

| China | 4–0 | Chinese Taipei |
|---|---|---|
| Wang Shuang 3' (pen.), 69'; Wang Shanshan 9'; Zhang Xin 53' | Report (FIFA); Report (AFC) |

Mumbai Football Arena, Mumbai
Attendance: 0
Referee: Abirami Naidu (Singapore)

China PR

Team stats
| China PR | Statistic | Chinese Taipei |
|---|---|---|
| 18 | Shots | 3 |
| 9 | Shots on target | 0 |
| 77% | Possession | 23% |
| 684 | Passes | 204 |
| 84% | Pass accuracy | 43% |
| 7 | Fouls | 6 |
| 1 | Yellow cards | 0 |
| 0 | Red cards | 0 |
| 3 | Offsides | 2 |
| 6 | Corners | 2 |

Chinese Taipei

| GK | 1 | Zhu Yu |
| RB | 14 | Lou Jiahui | (yellow card) 47' | (substituted off) 59' |
| CB | 3 | Wang Xiaoxue |
| CB | 4 | Li Jiayue |
| LB | 8 | Yao Wei |
| RM | 7 | Wang Shuang |
| CM | 13 | Yang Lina | | (substituted off) 46' |
| CM | 23 | Gao Chen |
| LM | 6 | Zhang Xin | | (substituted off) 78' |
| CF | 11 | Wang Shanshan (c) | | (substituted off) 74' |
| CF | 19 | Zhang Linyan | | (substituted off) 46' |
Substitutions:
| MF | 15 | Wu Chengshu | | (substituted on) 46' |
| MF | 16 | Yao Lingwei | | (substituted on) 46' |
| DF | 2 | Li Mengwen | | (substituted on) 59' |
| FW | 21 | Li Ying | | (substituted on) 74' |
| FW | 18 | Tang Jiali | | (substituted on) 78' |
Manager:
Shui Qingxia

| GK | 18 | Cheng Ssu-yu |
| CB | 4 | Lai Wei-ju |
| CB | 15 | Su Hsin-yun | (substituted off) 84' |
| CB | 16 | Chang Su-hsin |
| RWB | 6 | Zhuo Li-ping |
| LWB | 5 | Pan Shin-yu |
| RM | 13 | Pan Yen-hsin | (substituted off) 74' |
| CM | 9 | Hsu Yi-yun | (substituted off) 64' |
| CM | 11 | Lai Li-chin (c) |
| LM | 7 | Chen Yen-ping |
| CF | 19 | Su Yu-hsuan |
Substitutions:
| MF | 10 | Lee Hsiu-chin | (substituted on) 64' |
| MF | 14 | Wu Kai-ching | (substituted on) 74' |
| MF | 17 | Ting Chi | (substituted on) 84' |
Manager:
(Japan) Kazuo Echigo

Assistant referees:
Supawan Hinthong (Thailand)
Merlo Albano (Philippines)
Fourth official:
Pansa Chaisanit (Thailand)

=== India vs Iran ===
20 January 2022
19:30

| India | Voided (0–0) | Iran |
|---|---|---|
| | Report (FIFA); Report (AFC) |

DY Patil Stadium, Navi Mumbai
Attendance: 0
Referee: Lara Lee (Australia)

India

Team stats
| India | Statistic | Iran |
|---|---|---|
| 24 | Shots | 8 |
| 5 | Shots on target | 2 |
| 65% | Possession | 35% |
| 411 | Passes | 238 |
| 67% | Pass accuracy | 44% |
| 9 | Fouls | 6 |
| 1 | Yellow cards | 1 |
| 0 | Red cards | 0 |
| 1 | Offsides | 2 |
| 9 | Corners | 4 |

Iran

| GK | 1 | Aditi Chauhan |
| RB | 17 | Dalima Chhibber |
| CB | 3 | Manisa Panna |
| CB | 4 | Ashalata Devi (c) |
| LB | 16 | Manisha Kalyan | (yellow card) 69' | (substituted off) 82' |
| CM | 9 | Anju Tamang |
| CM | 7 | Ratanbala Devi | | (substituted off) 82' |
| CM | 12 | Indumathi Kathiresan |
| AM | 13 | Sandhiya Ranganathan | | (substituted off) 55' |
| CF | 10 | Pyari Xaxa | | (substituted off) 65' |
| CF | 8 | Sanju Yadav |
Substitutions:
| FW | 11 | Grace Dangmei | | (substituted on) 55' |
| FW | 15 | Renu Gour | | (substituted on) 65' |
| DF | 5 | Shilky Devi | | (substituted on) 82' |
| FW | 22 | Sumati Kumari | | (substituted on) 82' |
Manager:
(Sweden) Thomas Dennerby

| GK | 1 | Zohreh Koudaei |
| RB | 4 | Melika Motevalli |
| CB | 19 | Fatemeh Adeli |
| CB | 5 | Ghazaleh Banitalebi |
| LB | 8 | Behnaz Taherkhani (c) |
| RM | 11 | Samaneh Chahkandi | | (substituted off) 59' |
| CM | 23 | Sana Sadeghi | (yellow card) 67' | (substituted off) 70' |
| CM | 18 | Melika Mohammadi |
| LM | 6 | Zahra Sarbali | | (substituted off) 59' |
| CF | 17 | Negin Zandi | | (substituted off) 88' |
| CF | 20 | Hajar Dabbaghi | | (substituted off) 70' |
Substitutions:
| MF | 16 | Zahra Masoumi | | (substituted on) 59' |
| MF | 21 | Marzieh Nikkhah | | (substituted on) 59' |
| MF | 10 | Sara Zohrabi | | (substituted on) 70' |
| MF | 13 | Yasaman Farmani | | (substituted on) 70' |
| FW | 7 | Afsaneh Chatrenoor | | (substituted on) 88' |
Manager:
Maryam Irandoost

Assistant referees:
Joanna Charaktis (Australia)
Naomi Teshirogi (Japan)
Fourth official:
Yoshimi Yamashita (Japan)

=== Iran vs China PR ===
23 January 2022
15:30

| Iran | 0–7 | China |
|---|---|---|
| | Report (FIFA); Report (AFC) | Wang Shuang 28', 49' (pen.); Xiao Yuyi 43'; Wang Shanshan 55', 59'; Tang Jiali 77', 82' |

Mumbai Football Arena, Mumbai
Attendance: 0
Referee: Pansa Chaisanit (Thailand)

Iran

Team stats
| Iran | Statistic | China PR |
|---|---|---|
| 1 | Shots | 24 |
| 1 | Shots on target | 14 |
| 19% | Possession | 81% |
| 189 | Passes | 759 |
| 50% | Pass accuracy | 90% |
| 2 | Fouls | 10 |
| 0 | Yellow cards | 2 |
| 0 | Red cards | 0 |
| 0 | Offsides | 4 |
| 1 | Corners | 10 |

China PR

| GK | 1 | Zohreh Koudaei |
| RB | 4 | Melika Motevalli |
| CB | 19 | Fatemeh Adeli |
| CB | 5 | Ghazaleh Banitalebi |
| LB | 8 | Behnaz Taherkhani (c) |
| RM | 11 | Samaneh Chahkandi | (substituted off) 65' |
| CM | 23 | Sana Sadeghi | (substituted off) 46' |
| CM | 18 | Melika Mohammadi |
| LM | 6 | Zahra Sarbali | (substituted off) 65' |
| CF | 7 | Afsaneh Chatrenoor | (substituted off) 46' |
| CF | 20 | Hajar Dabbaghi | (substituted off) 79' |
Substitutions:
| MF | 10 | Sara Zohrabi | (substituted on) 46' |
| FW | 17 | Negin Zandi | (substituted on) 46' |
| DF | 2 | Fatemeh Amineh | (substituted on) 65' |
| FW | 9 | Sara Ghomi | (substituted on) 65' |
| MF | 14 | Elham Farahmand | (substituted on) 79' |
Manager:
Maryam Irandoost

| GK | 22 | Zhao Lina |
| RB | 14 | Lou Jiahui |
| CB | 4 | Li Jiayue | (yellow card) 46' |
| CB | 3 | Wang Xiaoxue |
| LB | 8 | Yao Wei | | (substituted off) 46' |
| RM | 7 | Wang Shuang |
| CM | 16 | Yao Lingwei | | (substituted off) 67' |
| CM | 23 | Gao Chen | | (substituted off) 46' |
| LM | 6 | Zhang Xin | | (substituted off) 61' |
| CF | 11 | Wang Shanshan (c) | | (substituted off) 61' |
| CF | 20 | Xiao Yuyi |
Substitutions:
| DF | 2 | Li Mengwen | | (substituted on) 46' |
| MF | 10 | Zhang Rui | (yellow card) 64' | (substituted on) 46' |
| MF | 9 | Wang Yanwen | | (substituted on) 61' |
| FW | 18 | Tang Jiali | | (substituted on) 61' |
| MF | 13 | Yang Lina | | (substituted on) 67' |
Manager:
Shui Qingxia

Assistant referees:
Supawan Hinthong (Thailand)
Merlo Albano (Philippines)
Fourth official:
Thein Thein Aye (Myanmar)

=== Chinese Taipei vs India ===
23 January 2022
19:30

| Chinese Taipei | Cancelled | India |
|---|---|---|
| | Report (FIFA); Report (AFC) |

DY Patil Stadium, Navi Mumbai
Referee: Oh Hyeon-jeong (South Korea)

Assistant referees:
Lee Seul-gi (South Korea)
Park Mi-suk (South Korea)
Fourth official:
Kim Yu-jeong (South Korea)

=== India vs China PR ===
26 January 2022
19:30

| India | Cancelled | China |
|---|---|---|
| | Report (FIFA); Report (AFC) |

Mumbai Football Arena, Mumbai

=== Chinese Taipei vs Iran ===
26 January 2022
19:30

| Chinese Taipei | 5–0 | Iran |
|---|---|---|
| Lai Li-chin 4', 31', 65' (pen.); Chen Yen-ping 40'; Wang Hsiang-huei 78' | Report (FIFA); Report (AFC) |

DY Patil Stadium, Navi Mumbai
Attendance: 0
Referee: Asaka Koizumi (Japan)

Chinese Taipei

Team stats
| Chinese Taipei | Statistic | Iran |
|---|---|---|
| 18 | Shots | 9 |
| 10 | Shots on target | 3 |
| 49% | Possession | 51% |
| 329 | Passes | 345 |
| 61% | Pass accuracy | 62% |
| 7 | Fouls | 12 |
| 0 | Yellow cards | 1 |
| 0 | Red cards | 0 |
| 5 | Offsides | 1 |
| 5 | Corners | 4 |

Iran

| GK | 18 | Cheng Ssu-yu |
| CB | 4 | Lai Wei-ju |
| CB | 15 | Su Hsin-yun |
| CB | 16 | Chang Su-hsin |
| RWB | 6 | Zhuo Li-ping | (substituted off) 89' |
| LWB | 5 | Pan Shin-yu |
| RM | 10 | Lee Hsiu-chin | (substituted off) 59' |
| CM | 9 | Hsu Yi-yun | (substituted off) 59' |
| CM | 11 | Lai Li-chin (c) | (substituted off) 89' |
| LM | 7 | Chen Yen-ping | (substituted off) 79' |
| CF | 19 | Su Yu-hsuan |
Substitutions:
| MF | 8 | Wang Hsiang-huei | (substituted on) 59' |
| MF | 17 | Ting Chi | (substituted on) 59' |
| FW | 3 | Lin Hsin-hui | (substituted on) 79' |
| MF | 2 | Chang Chi-lan | (substituted on) 89' |
| MF | 14 | Wu Kai-ching | (substituted on) 89' |
Manager:
(Japan) Kazuo Echigo

| GK | 1 | Zohreh Koudaei |
| RB | 4 | Melika Motevalli | (yellow card) 54' | (substituted off) 79' |
| CB | 19 | Fatemeh Adeli |
| CB | 2 | Fatemeh Amineh |
| LB | 8 | Behnaz Taherkhani (c) |
| RM | 16 | Zahra Masoumi |
| CM | 13 | Yasaman Farmani | | (substituted off) 46' |
| CM | 18 | Melika Mohammadi | | (substituted off) 60' |
| LM | 6 | Zahra Sarbali |
| CF | 7 | Afsaneh Chatrenoor | | (substituted off) 79' |
| CF | 20 | Hajar Dabbaghi |
Substitutions:
| MF | 10 | Sara Zohrabi | | (substituted on) 46' |
| MF | 14 | Elham Farahmand | | (substituted on) 60' |
| DF | 3 | Hadieh Kor | | (substituted on) 79' |
| FW | 9 | Sara Ghomi | | (substituted on) 79' |
Manager:
Maryam Irandoost

Assistant referees:
Makoto Bozono (Japan)
Park Mi-suk (South Korea)
Fourth official:
Yoshimi Yamashita (Japan)

== Discipline ==
Fair play points would have been used as tiebreakers in the group if the overall and head-to-head records of teams were tied, or if teams had the same record in the ranking of third-placed teams. These were calculated based on yellow and red cards received in all group matches as follows:

- yellow card = 1 point
- red card as a result of two yellow cards = 3 points
- direct red card = 3 points
- yellow card followed by direct red card = 4 points

| Team | Match 1 | | | | Match 2 | | | | Match 3 | | | | Points |
| Team | Booked | (yellow card) (yellow-red card) | Sent off (straight red) | (yellow card) (red card) | Booked | (yellow card) (yellow-red card) | Sent off (straight red) | (yellow card) (red card) | Booked | (yellow card) (yellow-red card) | Sent off (straight red) | (yellow card) (red card) | Points |
|---|---|---|---|---|---|---|---|---|---|---|---|---|---|
| China | 1 | | | | 2 | | | | | | | | –3 |
| Chinese Taipei | | | | | | | | | | | | | 0 |
| Iran | | | | | | | | | 1 | | | | –1 |
| India (H) | | | | | | | | | | | | | WD |
