= List of Iran women's international footballers =

This is a list of Iranian association football players who have played for the Iran women's national football team.

== Players ==
Last updated : 9 July 2020
| Player | Games | Goals | First Game | Last Game | Ref. |
|---|---|---|---|---|---|
| Sanaz Abazarnejad | 1 | 0 | 2016.10.21 | 2016.10.21 | |
| Fatemeh Adeli | 5 | 0 | 2017.04.09 | 2019.04.09 | |
| Fatemeh Amineh Borazjani | 8 | 0 | 2018.11.08 | 2019.04.09 | |
| Zahra Amini | 2 | 0 | 2009.07.06 | 2009.07.08 | |
| Elham Anafjeh | 3 | 0 | 2017.04.03 | 2017.04.09 | |
| Fatemeh Arzhangi | 2 | 0 | 2009.07.06 | 2009.07.08 | |
| Shabnam Behesht | ? | 2 | ? | ? | |
| Samaneh Chahkandi | 10 | 3 | 2017.04.03 | 2019.04.09 | |
| Afsaneh Chatrenoor | 7 | 0 | 2017.04.03 | 2019.02.13 | |
| Hajar Dabbaghi | 8 | 5 | 2018.11.08 | 2019.04.09 | |
| Elham Farahmand | 7 | 0 | 2017.04.05 | 2019.04.06 | |
| Parvin Farhadi | 3 | 0 | 2016.10.21 | 2019.04.09 | |
| Fatemeh Geraeli | 3 | 0 | 2017.04.03 | 2017.04.09 | |
| Zahra Ghanbari | 17+ | 13 | 2007.10 | 2019.04.09 | |
| Fatemeh Ghasemi | 3 | 2 | 2017.04.03 | 2017.04.11 | |
| Sara Ghomi | 17+ | 6+ | 2012 | 2019.04.09 | |
| Mona Hamoudi | 5 | 2 | 2018.11.08 | 2019.04.09 | |
| Mina Hashemi | 2 | 0 | 2009.07.06 | 2009.07.08 | |
| Zahra Hatamnejad | 3+ | 1 | 2011.03 | 2017.04.11 | |
| Vahideh Isari | 2 | 0 | 2013.05.21 | 2017.04.11 | |
| Masoomeh Jahanchi | 1 | 0 | 2009.07.08 | 2009.07.08 | |
| Kousar Kamali | 6 | 0 | 2013.05.23 | 2017.04.11 | |
| Fereshteh Karimi | 2 | 2 | 2009.07.06 | 2009.07.08 | |
| Zahra Khajavi | 6 | 0 | 2018.11.08 | 2019.04.09 | |
| Maryam Khavi | 1 | 0 | 2009.07.06 | 2009.07.06 | |
| Koueistan Khosravi | 10 | 0 | 2009.07.06 | 2017.04.11 | |
| Zohreh Koudaei | 2 | 0 | 2009.07.06 | 2009.07.08 | |
| Bayan Mahmoudi | 2 | 0 | 2009.07.06 | 2009.07.08 | |
| Mahdiyeh Molaei | 1 | 0 | 2016.10.21 | 2016.10.21 | |
| Melika Motevalli | 7 | 1 | 2018 | 2019 | |
| Foroogh Mouri | 6 | 2 | 2017 | 2019 | |
| Maryam Nami | 2 | 0 | 2019 | 2019 | |
| Zahra Pourheidar | 1 | 0 | 2019 | 2019 | |
| Maryam Rahimi | 7+ | 6 | 2009.07.06 | 2013.05.25 | |
| Mastoreh Rahmani | 2 | 0 | 2009.07.06 | 2009.07.08 | |
| Shaghayegh Rouzbahan | 9 | 1 | 2013 | 2019 | |
| Zahra Sarbali | 8 | 0 | 2018 | 2019 | |
| Zarrin Sepideh | 2 | 0 | 2009.07.06 | 2009.07.08 | |
| Hajar Shahmoradi | 3 | 0 | 2013.05.21 | 2013.05.25 | |
| Fatemi Sohrabi | 7 | 0 | 2018 | 2019 | |
| Zomorod Soleimani | 1 | 0 | 2017.04.09 | 2017.04.09 | |
| Behnaz Taherkhani | 6 | 0 | 2018 | 2019 | |
| Maryam Yektaei | 7+ | 0 | 2013.05.23 | 2017.04.11 | |
| Mogharrab Zadhosseinali | 1 | 0 | 2017.04.11 | 2017.04.11 | |
| Sara Zohrabi | 10 | 5 | 2016.10.21 | 2019.02.13 | |

== See also ==
- Iran women's national football team
- Football Federation Islamic Republic of Iran
- Football in Iran
