= 2019 CAFA U-23 Women's Championship =

CAFA U-23 Women's Championship 2019
Чемпионат CAFA-2019 среди женских олимпийских сборных

Tournament details
- Host country: Tajikistan
- Dates: 22–28 November
- Teams: 6 (from 1 sub-confederation)
- Venues: 2 (in 2 host cities)

Final positions
- Champions: Uzbekistan (1st title)
- Runners-up: Iran
- Third place: Tajikistan
- Fourth place: Kyrgyzstan

Tournament statistics
- Matches played: 15
- Goals scored: 67 (4.47 per match)
- Attendance: 945 (63 per match)
- Top scorer(s): (Iran) Hajar Dabbaghi (8 goals)
- Best player: (Uzbekistan) Umida Zoirova
- Fair play award: Afghanistan

2019 CAFA U-23 Women's Championship was the inaugural edition of the CAFA Women's Under-23 Championship, the international women's football championship organised by Central Asian Football Association for the women's under-23 national teams of Central Asia. The tournament was hosted by Tajikistan from 22 to 28 November. A total of six teams played in the tournament, with players born on or after 1 January 1996 eligible to participate.

Uzbekistan emerged as the inaugural champions of the tournament, securing their title with an undefeated record, dominating all five competing teams and scoring a total of 29 goals.

== Participation ==
=== Participating teams ===
All six CAFA nations entered the competition.

Team	Appearance	Previous best performance
Afghanistan	1st	—N/a
Iran	1st	—N/a
Kyrgyzstan	1st	—N/a
Tajikistan	1st	—N/a
Turkmenistan	1st	—N/a
Uzbekistan	1st	—N/a

=== Squads ===
Players born on or after 1 January 1996 were eligible to compete in the tournament.

== Venues ==
Fifteen matches took place across two host cities at the following venues:

Dushanbe	Hisor	2019 CAFA U-23 Women's Championship (Tajikistan)
Republic Central Stadium	Hisor Central Stadium	2019 CAFA U-23 Women's Championship (Tajikistan)
Capacity: 20,000	Capacity: 20,000	2019 CAFA U-23 Women's Championship (Tajikistan)

== Main Tournament ==
All times are local, TTJ. (UTC+5)

On 21 November 2019, CAFA released the official match schedule.

Pos	Team	Pld	W	D	L	GF	GA	GD	Pts	Final result
1	Uzbekistan	5	5	0	0	29	0	+29	15	Champions
2	Iran	5	4	0	1	22	3	+19	12	Runners-up
3	Tajikistan (H)	5	2	1	2	7	8	−1	7	Third place
4	Kyrgyzstan	5	1	1	3	3	14	−11	4	
5	Afghanistan	5	1	0	4	3	26	−23	3 (Note: Head-to-head points: Afghanistan 3, Turkmenistan 0)	
6	Turkmenistan	5	1	0	4	3	16	−13	3	

Source: CAFA
Rules for classification: 1) Points; 2) head-to-head matches; 3) Goal difference; 4) Number of goals scored.
(H) Hosts
Notes:
22 November 2019
14:00

Uzbekistan	6–0	Kyrgyzstan
Kudratova 61', 84'; Dorofeeva 66' (o.g.); Zoirova 79', 82'; Burkhonova 90+2'	Report (FFT); Report (AFC)

Hisor Central Stadium, Hisor
Attendance: 40
Referee: Aso Javaheri (Iran)
22 November 2019
14:00

Afghanistan	2–1	Turkmenistan
Haidari 39'; Tabish 63'	Report (FFT); Report (AFC)	Haipowa 65'

Republic Central Stadium, Dushanbe
Attendance: 87
Referee: Malika Kadyrova (Kyrgyzstan)
22 November 2019
17:00

Iran	4–0	Tajikistan
Geraeli 31', 79'; Ghasemi 37'; Dabbaghi 71' (pen.)	Report (FFT); Report (AFC)

Republic Central Stadium, Dushanbe
Attendance: 112
Referee: Kristina Borisova (Uzbekistan)

23 November 2019
14:00

Iran	5–0	Turkmenistan
Shaban 5', 8'; Dabbaghi 11', 23'; Geraeli 45+1'	Report (FFT)

Hisor Central Stadium, Hisor
Attendance: 37
Referee: Yasmin Haidari (Afghanistan)
23 November 2019
14:00

Uzbekistan	10–0	Afghanistan
Erkinova 4', 47'; Rashidova 5', 10', 13', 35', 45+1', 48'; Vakhidova 54' (pen.); Shodieva 90+2'	Report (FFT)

Republic Central Stadium, Dushanbe
Attendance: 35
Referee: Nodira Mirzoeva (Tajikistan)
23 November 2019
17:00

Tajikistan	0–0	Kyrgyzstan
	Report (FFT)

Republic Central Stadium, Dushanbe
Attendance: 80
Referee: Salma Razavi (Iran)

25 November 2019
14:00

Tajikistan	5–1	Afghanistan
Saidova 39'; Abdulloeva 68'; Kholnazarova 78'; Khudododova 80'; Halimova 90+2'	Report (FFT)	Haidari 84'

Hisor Central Stadium, Hisor
Attendance: 45
Referee: Aso Javaheri (Iran)
22 November 2019
14:00

Kyrgyzstan	0–6	Iran
	Report (FFT)	Shaban 46', 84'; Dabbaghi 55', 57'; Ghasemi 63', 90+1'

Republic Central Stadium, Dushanbe
Attendance: 25
Referee: Yasmin Haidari (Afghanistan)
25 November 2019
17:00

Turkmenistan	0–7	Uzbekistan
	Report (FFT)	Zaynitdinova 4'; Shoyimova 21' (pen.), 43'; Zaripova 46'; Vokhidova 48'; Rashidova 84'; Burkhonova 85'

Republic Central Stadium, Dushanbe
Attendance: 39
Referee: Salma Razavi (Iran)

26 November 2019
14:00

Uzbekistan	3–0	Iran
Kudratova 14'; Zoirova 65'; Nozimova 82'	Report (FFT)

Hisor Central Stadium, Hisor
Attendance: 54
Referee: Malika Kadyrova (Kyrgyzstan)
26 November 2019
14:00

Kyrgyzstan	3–0	Afghanistan
Boronbekova 20'; Duishobaeva 30', 39'	Report (FFT)

Republic Central Stadium, Dushanbe
Attendance: 26
Referee: Salma Razavi (Iran)
26 November 2019
17:00

Turkmenistan	0–2	Tajikistan
	Report (FFT)	Khudododova 25'; Normuratova 45+2'

Republic Central Stadium, Dushanbe
Attendance: 130
Referee: Kristina Borisova (Uzbekistan)

28 November 2019
14:00

Tajikistan	0–3	Uzbekistan
	Report (FFT)	Nozimova 2'; Zoirova 8'; Kudratova 32'

Hisor Central Stadium, Hisor
Attendance: 75
Referee: Aso Javaheri (Iran)
28 November 2019
14:00

Kyrgyzstan	0–2	Turkmenistan
	Report (FFT)	Artykowa 19'; Rejepowa 87'

Republic Central Stadium, Dushanbe
Attendance: 39
Referee: Nodira Mirzoeva (Tajikistan)
28 November 2019
17:00

Iran	7–0	Afghanistan
Dabbaghi 14', 38', 66'; Geraeli 33'; Masoumi 64'; Shaban 85'; Borazjani 90+4'	Report (FFT)

Republic Central Stadium, Dushanbe
Attendance: 121
Referee: Kristina Borisova (Uzbekistan)

== Goalscorers ==
There were 67 goals scored in 15 matches, for an average of 4.47 goals per match.

8 goals

- (Iran) Hajar Dabbaghi

7 goals

- (Uzbekistan) Tojinisokhon Rashidova

5 goals

- (Iran) Fatemeh Shaban

4 goals

- (Iran) Fatemeh Geraeli
- (Uzbekistan) Nilufar Kudratova
- (Uzbekistan) Umida Zoirova

3 goals

- (Iran) Fatemeh Ghasemi

2 goals

- (Afghanistan) Fatima Haidari
- (Kyrgyzstan) Adinai Duishobaeva
- (Tajikistan) Nekubakht Khudododova
- (Uzbekistan) Malika Burkhonova
- (Uzbekistan) Diyora Erkinova
- (Uzbekistan) Madina Vakhidova
- (Uzbekistan) Maftuna Shoyimova
- (Uzbekistan) Dildora Nozimova

1 goal

- (Afghanistan) Fahima Tabish
- (Iran) Fatemeh Borazjani
- (Iran) Zahra Masoumi
- (Kyrgyzstan) Aizhan Boronbekova
- (Tajikistan) Rafina Normuratova
- (Tajikistan) Sakhina Saidova
- (Tajikistan) Zeboniso Abdulloeva
- (Tajikistan) Sayramjon Kholnazarova
- (Tajikistan) Jonona Halimova
- (Turkmenistan) Läle Haipowa
- (Turkmenistan) Gözel Artykowa
- (Turkmenistan) Mahym Rejepowa
- (Uzbekistan) Laylo Shodieva
- (Uzbekistan) Shakhrizoda Zaynitdinova
- (Uzbekistan) Kamila Zaripova

1 own goal

- (Kyrgyzstan) Irina Dorofeeva (against Uzbzkistan)
