= 2022 in Chinese football =

Football in China
- Season: 2022

The 2022 season was the 72nd season of competitive association football in China.

== National teams ==
=== China national football team ===
==== Results and fixtures ====
===== 2022 FIFA World Cup qualification =====
====== Third Round ======
Pos	Team	Pld	W	D	L	GF	GA	GD	Pts	Qualification	Saudi Arabia	Japan	Australia	Oman	People's Republic of China	Vietnam
1	Saudi Arabia	10	7	2	1	12	6	+6	23	2022 FIFA World Cup	—	1–0	1–0	1–0	3–2	3–1
2	Japan	10	7	1	2	12	4	+8	22	2022 FIFA World Cup	2–0	—	2–1	0–1	2–0	1–1
3	Australia	10	4	3	3	15	9	+6	15	Fourth round	0–0	0–2	—	3–1	3–0	4–0
4	Oman	10	4	2	4	11	10	+1	14		0–1	0–1	2–2	—	2–0	3–1
5	China	10	1	3	6	9	19	−10	6		1–1	0–1	1–1	1–1	—	3–2
6	Vietnam	10	1	1	8	8	19	−11	4		0–1	0–1	0–1	0–1	3–1	—

Source: FIFA, AFC
Rules for classification: Tiebreakers

27 January 2022 FIFA World Cup qualification R3	Japan	2–0	China	Saitama, Japan
19:00 UTC+9	Osako 13' (pen.); Ito 61'	Report (FIFA)		Stadium: Saitama Stadium 2002; Attendance: 11,753; Referee: Abdulrahman Al-Jassim (Qatar)

1 February 2022 FIFA World Cup qualification R3	Vietnam	3–1	China	Hanoi, Vietnam
19:00 UTC+7	Hồ Tấn Tài 9'; Nguyễn Tiến Linh 16'; Phan Văn Đức 76'	Report (FIFA)	Xu Xin 90+7'	Stadium: Mỹ Đình National Stadium; Attendance: 6,099; Referee: Nawaf Shukralla (Bahrain)

24 March 2022 FIFA World Cup qualification R3	China	1–1	Saudi Arabia	Sharjah, United Arab Emirates
19:00 UTC+4	Zhu Chenjie 82' (pen.)	Report (FIFA)	Al-Shehri 45+1'	Stadium: Sharjah Stadium; Attendance: 0 Referee: Mohammed Abdulla Hassan Mohamed (United Arab Emirates)

29 March 2022 FIFA World Cup qualification R3	Oman	2–0	China	Muscat, Oman
20:00 UTC+4	Al-Alawi 12'; Fawaz 74'	Report (FIFA)		Stadium: Sultan Qaboos Sports Complex; Referee: Ko Hyung-jin (South Korea)

===== EAFF E-1 Football Championship =====
July 2022 EAFF E-1 Football Championship	China	v	TBD, China
--:-- UTC+8			Stadium: TBD

July 2022 EAFF E-1 Football Championship	China	v	TBD, China
--:-- UTC+8			Stadium: TBD

July 2022 EAFF E-1 Football Championship	China	v	TBD, China
--:-- UTC+8			Stadium: TBD

=== China women's national football team ===
==== Results and fixtures ====
===== AFC Women's Asian Cup =====
====== Group A ======
Pos	Team	Pld	W	D	L	GF	GA	GD	Pts	Qualification	CHN	TPE	IRN	IND
1	China	2	2	0	0	11	0	+11	6	Knockout stage	—			
2	Chinese Taipei	2	1	0	1	5	4	+1	3	Knockout stage		—		
3	Iran	2	0	0	2	0	12	−12	0				—	
4	India (H)	0	0	0	0	0	0	0	0	Withdrew (Note: India failed to name the required 13 players and were unable to play their match of the group stage against Chinese Taipei due to them having only fewer than 13 players left with the remaining team members testing positive for COVID-19. They were considered to have withdrawn from the competition, and all previous matches played by them shall be considered "null and void" and would not be considered in determining the final group rankings.)				—

Source: AFC
Rules for classification: Group stage tiebreakers
(H) Hosts
Notes:

20 January 2022 AFC Women's Asian Cup	China	4–0	Chinese Taipei	Mumbai, India
15:30 UTC+5:30	Wang Shuang 3' (pen.), 68'; Wang Shanshan 9'; Zhang Xin 54'	Report (FIFA); Report (AFC)		Stadium: Mumbai Football Arena; Attendance: 0 Referee: Abirami Naidu (Singapore)

23 January 2022 AFC Women's Asian Cup	Iran	0–7	China	Mumbai, India
15:30 UTC+5:30		Report	Wang Shuang 28', 49' (pen.); Xiao Yuyi 43'; Wang Shanshan 55', 59'; Tang Jiali 77'; Adeli 82' (o.g.)	Stadium: Mumbai Football Arena; Referee: Pansa Chaisanit (Thailand)

26 January 2022 AFC Women's Asian Cup	India	Cancelled	China	Mumbai, India
19:30 UTC+5:30		Report		Stadium: Mumbai Football Arena

====== Knockout stage ======
30 January 2022 AFC Women's Asian Cup QF	China	3–1	Vietnam	Navi Mumbai, India
17:30 UTC+5:30		Report		Stadium: DY Patil Stadium; Referee: Oh Hyeon-jeong (South Korea)

3 February 2022 AFC Women's Asian Cup SF	China	2–2 (a.e.t.) (4–3 p)	Japan	Pune, India
19:30 UTC+5:30	Wu Chengshu 46'; Wang Shanshan 119'	Report	Ueki 26', 103'	Stadium: Shiv Chhatrapati Sports Complex; Referee: Lara Lee (Australia)
	Penalties
	Zhang Xin (penalty missed); Zhang Rui (penalty scored); Yang Lina (penalty scored); Gao Chen (penalty scored); Wang Shanshan (penalty scored)		(penalty missed) Kumagai; (penalty scored) Hasegawa; (penalty scored) Shimizu; (penalty scored) Nagano; (penalty missed) Minami

6 February 2022 AFC Women's Asian Cup F	China	3–2	South Korea	Navi Mumbai, India
		Report		Stadium: DY Patil Stadium

===== EAFF E-1 Football Championship =====
July 2022 EAFF E-1 Football Championship	China	v	TBD, China
--:-- UTC+8			Stadium: TBD

July 2022 EAFF E-1 Football Championship	China	v	TBD, China
--:-- UTC+8			Stadium: TBD

July 2022 EAFF E-1 Football Championship	China	v	TBD, China
--:-- UTC+8			Stadium: TBD

== Men's football ==
=== Super League ===
Pos	Team	Pld	W	D	L	GF	GA	GD	Pts	Qualification or relegation
1	Wuhan Three Towns (C, Q)	34	25	3	6	91	28	+63	78 (Note: Wuhan Three Towns finished ahead of Shandong Taishan on goal difference.)	Qualification for AFC Champions League group stage
2	Shandong Taishan (Q)	34	25	3	6	87	29	+58	78	Qualification for AFC Champions League group stage (Note: As Chinese FA Cup winners.)
3	Zhejiang (Q)	34	18	11	5	64	28	+36	65 (Note: Zhejiang finished ahead of Shanghai Port and Chengdu Rongcheng on head-to-head points and Shanghai Port finished ahead of Chengdu Rongcheng on head-to-head points: Zhejiang 2–1 Shanghai Port, Shanghai Port 1–1 Zhejiang, Zhejiang 1–1 Chengdu Rongcheng, Chengdu Rongcheng 1–1 Zhejiang, Shanghai Port 3–0 Chengdu Rongcheng, Chengdu Rongcheng 0–0 Shanghai Port.)	Qualification for AFC Champions League play-off round
4	Shanghai Port (Q)	34	20	5	9	55	25	+30	65	Qualification for AFC Champions League play-off round
5	Chengdu Rongcheng	34	18	11	5	49	28	+21	65	
6	Henan Songshan Longmen	34	17	8	9	60	32	+28	59	
7	Beijing Guoan	34	17	7	10	57	49	+8	58	
8	Tianjin Jinmen Tiger	34	14	7	13	45	42	+3	49 (Note: Tianjin Jinmen Tiger finished ahead of Meizhou Hakka on head-to-head points: Tianjin Jinmen Tiger 1–0 Meizhou Hakka, Meizhou Hakka 1–1 Tianjin Jinmen Tiger.)	
9	Meizhou Hakka	34	14	7	13	43	41	+2	49	
10	Shanghai Shenhua (Note: Shanghai Shenhua had 6 points deducted due to unpaid salaries on 23 November 2022.)	34	14	11	9	42	34	+8	47	
11	Dalian Pro (Note: After Dalian Pro had defeated Guangzhou City 2–0, Chinese Football Association awarded Guangzhou City a 3–0 win as a result of Dalian Pro failing to field at least one U-23 player on the field when Dalian Pro substituted off Huang Jiahui, their only U-23 player on the field, at the 67th minute for non U-23 player Wu Wei and substituted on two U-23 players at the 69th minute.)	34	12	9	13	49	53	−4	45	
12	Cangzhou Mighty Lions	34	11	11	12	47	51	−4	44 (Note: Cangzhou Mighty Lions finished ahead of Changchun Yatai on head-to-head goal difference: Cangzhou Mighty Lions 1–2 Changchun Yatai, Changchun Yatai 0–2 Cangzhou Mighty Lions.)	
13	Changchun Yatai	34	11	11	12	49	50	−1	44	
14	Shenzhen	34	9	3	22	29	74	−45	30	
15	Guangzhou City (D)	34	6	5	23	32	62	−30	23	Dissolved
16	Wuhan Yangtze River (Note: Wuhan Yangtze River had 3 points deducted due to unpaid salaries on 5 November 2022 and had 6 points deducted due to unpaid salaries on 23 November 2022.) (D, R)	34	8	4	22	34	71	−37	19	Dissolved
17	Guangzhou (R)	34	3	8	23	24	63	−39	17	Relegation to League One
18	Hebei (Note: Hebei had 3 points deducted due to unpaid salaries on 5 November 2022 and had 6 points deducted due to unpaid salaries on 23 November 2022.) (D, R)	34	2	0	32	18	115	−97	−3	Dissolved

Source: Soccerway
Rules for classification:
- During season: 1) Points; 2) Goal difference; 3) Goals scored.
- After season: 1) Points; 2) Head-to-head points; 3) Head-to-head goal difference; 4) Head-to-head goals scored; 5) Scores of the weight ratio of the reserve league and youth leagues.
  (C) Champions; (D) Disqualified; (Q) Qualified for the phase indicated; (R) Relegated
  Notes:

=== League One ===
Pos	Team	Pld	W	D	L	GF	GA	GD	Pts	Promotion, qualification or relegation
1	Kunshan (C, D)	34	28	5	1	80	19	+61	89	Dissolved
2	Qingdao Hainiu (P)	34	23	7	4	77	24	+53	76	Promotion to Super League
3	Nantong Zhiyun (P)	34	21	7	6	62	22	+40	70	Promotion to Super League
4	Shijiazhuang Gongfu	34	20	6	8	50	31	+19	66	
5	Shaanxi Chang'an Athletic (Note: Shaanxi Chang'an Athletic had 6 points deducted due to unpaid salaries on 23 November 2022.) (D)	34	18	8	8	55	32	+23	56	Dissolved
6	Suzhou Dongwu	34	16	7	11	42	33	+9	55	
7	Sichuan Jiuniu (Note: Sichuan Jiuniu had 6 points deducted due to unpaid salaries on 23 November 2022.)	34	18	3	13	40	30	+10	51	
8	Nanjing City	34	14	8	12	45	38	+7	50	
9	Qingdao Youth Island	34	13	9	12	47	44	+3	48	
10	Heilongjiang Ice City (Note: Chinese Football Association awarded Heilongjiang Ice City a 3–0 win against Zibo Cuju after Zibo Cuju failed to name enough players to compete on 1 August 2022. Heilongjiang Ice City and Zibo Cuju had 6 points deducted due to unpaid salaries on 23 November 2022.)	34	13	7	14	48	48	0	40	
11	Guangxi Pingguo Haliao	34	6	17	11	32	38	−6	35 (Note: Guangxi Pingguo Haliao finished ahead of Liaoning Shenyang Urban on goal difference.)	
12	Liaoning Shenyang Urban	34	9	8	17	34	53	−19	35	
13	Shanghai Jiading Huilong	34	10	4	20	38	65	−27	34	
14	Jiangxi Beidamen (Note: Chinese Football Association awarded Jiangxi Beidamen and Kunshan each a 3–0 win against Beijing BIT after Beijing BIT failed to arrive in the centralised venues due to COVID-19 travel restrictions on 6 July 2022. Jiangxi Beidamen had 6 points deducted due to unpaid salaries on 23 November 2022. Later, Kunshan was classified to have lost 3-0.)	34	10	9	15	40	51	−11	33 (Note: Jiangxi Beidamen finished ahead of Zibo Cuju on goal difference: Jiangxi Beidamen 2–1 Zibo Cuju, Zibo Cuju 1–2 Jiangxi Beidamen.)	
15	Zibo Cuju (D)	34	11	6	17	37	53	−16	33	Dissolved
16	Beijing BSU (D, R)	34	6	6	22	24	59	−35	24	Dissolved
17	Xinjiang Tianshan Leopard (D, R)	34	6	3	25	31	83	−52	21	Dissolved
18	Beijing BIT (R)	34	2	4	28	18	77	−59	10	Relegation to League Two

Source: Soccerway
Rules for classification:
- During season: 1) Points; 2) Goal difference; 3) Goals scored
- After season: 1) Points; 2) Head-to-head points; 3) Head-to-head goal difference; 4) Head-to-head goals scored; 5) Goal difference; 6) Goals scored; 7) Disciplinary points (1 point for each yellow card, 3 points for each red card); 8) Draw
  (C) Champions; (D) Disqualified; (P) Promoted; (R) Relegated
  Notes:

== Managerial changes ==
This is a list of changes of managers within Chinese professional league football:

=== China League One ===
Team	Outgoing manager	Manner of departure	Date of vacancy	Position in table	Incoming manager	Date of appointment
Sichuan Jiuniu	(China) Li Yi	Mutual consent	25 December 2021	Pre-season		
