= 2011 AFC U-16 Women's Championship qualification =

Tournament details
- Dates: 10 October – 12 December 2010
- Teams: 11 (from 1 confederation)

Tournament statistics
- Matches played: 23
- Goals scored: 119 (5.17 per match)

The 2011 AFC U-16 Women's Championship qualification was qualification section of 2011 AFC U-16 Women's Championship. It was held from October 10 to December 12, 2010.

== First qualification round ==
=== Group A ===
Team	Pld	W	D	L	GF	GA	GD	Pts
Vietnam	4	4	0	0	33	0	+33	12
Guam	4	3	0	1	8	6	+2	9
Philippines	4	2	0	2	9	5	+4	6
Singapore	4	1	0	3	7	13	−6	3
Timor-Leste	4	0	0	4	0	33	−33	0

15 Oct 2010

Vietnam	9–0	Singapore
Le Hoai Luong 14', 39'; Phan Thi Trang 25', 73', 90+1'; Nguyen Diem Hang 38'; Chuong Thi Kieu 51', 66'; Trinh Ha Trang 55'	Report

UMAK Stadium, Makati
Attendance: 50
Referee: Sato Nami (Japan)

15 Oct 2010

Timor-Leste	0–4	Guam
	Report	Ungacta 35'; Martinez 42', 73'; Kukes 75'

UMAK Stadium, Makati
Attendance: 100
Referee: Rita Gani (Malaysia)

17 Oct 2010

Guam	2–0	Philippines
Kukes 33'; Martinez 45+1'	Report

UMAK Stadium, Makati
Attendance: 60
Referee: Saltanat Noroozi (Iran)

17 Oct 2010

Timor-Leste	0–16	Vietnam
	Report	Chuong Thi Kieu 1', 10', 33', 39'; Phan Thi Trang 12'; Nguyen Thi Thao Anh 20'; Nguyen Diem Hang 23', 62', 68', 81'; Hoang Thi Thao 29', 31', 35', 72', 88'; Trinh Ha Trang 78'

UMAK Stadium, Makati
Attendance: 40
Referee: Maria Piedade Rebello (India)

19 Oct 2010

Philippines	7–0	Timor-Leste
Barcemo 10', 22'; Camcam 15', 32'; Castaneda 43'; Metillo 68'; Dimaandal 80'	Report

UMAK Stadium, Makati
Attendance: 30
Referee: Rita Gani (Malaysia)

19 Oct 2010

Singapore	1–2	Guam
Jamil 5'	Report	Martinez 28'; Iriarte 52'

UMAK Stadium, Makati
Attendance: 30
Referee: Sato Nami (Japan)

22 Oct 2010

Singapore	6–0	Timor-Leste
Fraij 3', 64'; Nur Faiezah Binte Ishak 31', 35'; Rosielin 50'; Nurul Khairiah Binte Azhar 89'	Report

UMAK Stadium, Makati
Attendance: 20
Referee: Maria Piedade Rebello (India)

22 Oct 2010

Vietnam	3–0	Philippines
Chuong Thi Kieu 45'; Le Hoai Luong 69', 87'	Report

UMAK Stadium, Makati
Attendance: 50
Referee: Saltanat Noroozi (Iran)

24 Oct 2010

Guam	0–5	Vietnam
	Report	Phan Thi Trang 33', 70', 78'; Le Hoai Luong 54'; Chuong Thi Kieu 82'

UMAK Stadium, Makati
Attendance: 20
Referee: Maria Piedade Rebello (India)

24 Oct 2010

Philippines	2–0	Singapore
Castaneda 66'; Camcam 75'	Report

UMAK Stadium, Makati
Attendance: 50
Referee: Sato Nami (Japan)

=== Group B ===
Team	Pld	W	D	L	GF	GA	GD	Pts
Iran	2	1	1	0	4	1	+3	4
Jordan	2	1	1	0	4	1	+3	4
India	2	0	0	2	0	6	−6	0

- Bahrain and Uzbekistan withdrew from 2011 AFC U16 qualification.
10 Oct 2010

Jordan	3–0	India
Alnaber 27', 85'; Sweilem 81'	Report

Petra Stadium, Amman
Attendance: 700
Referee: Kim Mi Ok (South Korea)

12 Oct 2010

Iran	3–0	India
Ardestani 35', 45'; Taherkhani 90+2'	Report

Petra Stadium, Amman
Attendance: 200
Referee: Phennaphar Khamnork (Thailand)

14 Oct 2010

Jordan	1–1	Iran
Alnaber 55'	Report	Aynaz 71'
Penalties
Hina (penalty scored); Al Waqfi (penalty scored)	2–4	Yasaman (penalty scored); Zohrabi Nia (penalty scored); Ardestani (penalty scored); Taherkhani (penalty scored)

Petra Stadium, Amman
Attendance: 600
Referee: Abirami D/O Apbai Naidu (Singapore)

Note: Since Jordan and Iran tied in points, goal differences, number of goals and the head-to-head result, a penalty shootout was held after the 90 minutes match to determine the group winner, in which Iran won and advanced to the second round.

== Second qualification round ==
- All matches in Bangkok, Thailand.
- Times listed are UTC+7.

Team	Pld	W	D	L	GF	GA	GD	Pts
Thailand	4	3	0	1	9	7	+2	9
Myanmar	4	3	0	1	11	2	+9	9
Chinese Taipei	4	2	1	1	10	8	+2	7
Vietnam	4	1	1	2	8	11	−3	4
Iran	4	0	0	4	3	13	−10	0

- Thailand is ranked ahead of Myanmar based on head-to-head result
3 December 2010
15:00

Chinese Taipei	0–3	Myanmar
	Report	Nilar Win 19', 90+1'; May Thu Kyaw 89'

Rajamangala Stadium, Bangkok
Attendance: 30
Referee: Ri Hong Sil (Korea DPR)

3 December 2010
17:30

Iran	2–4	Vietnam
Behnaz Taherkhani 85', 87'	Report	Le Hoai Luong 45+1', 68'; Phan Thi Trang 54'; Nguyen Diem Hang 86'

Rajamangala Stadium, Bangkok
Attendance: 50
Referee: Iwaki Mariko (Japan)

5 December 2010
15:00

Vietnam	1–3	Thailand
Phan Thi Trang 81'	Report	Alisa Rukpinij 18' (pen.); Oraya Sridarak 45+1', 63'

Rajamangala Stadium, Bangkok
Attendance: 120
Referee: Cha Sung Mi (Korea Republic)

5 December 2010
17:30

Iran	0–3	Chinese Taipei
	Report	Tuan Yu-Jou 18'; Su Sin-Yun 23'; Lin Hui-Wen 37'

Rajamangala Stadium, Bangkok
Attendance: 80
Referee: Kim Sook Hee (Korea Republic)

7 December 2010
15:30

Thailand	2–1	Iran
Alisa Rukpinij 22' (pen.); Oraya Sridarak 78'	Report	Zohrabi Nia 80'

Rajamangala Stadium, Bangkok
Attendance: 100
Referee: Kim Sook Hee (Korea Republic)

7 December 2010
17:30

Myanmar	3–0	Vietnam
May Thu Kyaw 53', 64'; Aye Aye Moe 67'	Report

Rajamangala Stadium, Bangkok
Attendance: 100
Referee: Cha Sung Mi (Korea Republic)

10 December 2010
15:00

Myanmar	4–0	Iran
May Thu Kyaw 26'; Nilar Win 45+6'; Aye Aye Moe 51'; Win Theingi Tun 54'	Report

Rajamangala Stadium, Bangkok
Attendance: 50
Referee: Ri Hong Sil (Korea DPR)

10 December 2010
17:30

Chinese Taipei	4–2	Thailand
Lo Tien-Yu 24'; Lin Hui-Wen 50'; Jhang Wei-Ling 69', 84'	Report	Oraya Sridarak 57', 71'

Rajamangala Stadium, Bangkok
Attendance: 150
Referee: Iwaki Mariko (Japan)

12 December 2010
15:00

Vietnam	3–3	Chinese Taipei
Le Hoai Luong 26', 85'; Nguyen Thi Thao Anh 30'	Report	Lin Hui-Wen 19'; Chen Yen-Han 21'; Lo Tien-Yu 72'

Rajamangala Stadium, Bangkok
Attendance: 100
Referee: Iwaki Mariko (Japan)

12 December 2010
17:30

Thailand	2–1	Myanmar
Orapin Waenngoen 24'; Jutarat Innurag 81'	Report	May Thu Kyaw 32'

Rajamangala Stadium, Bangkok
Attendance: 200
Referee: Cha Sung Mi (Korea Republic)

== Qualified teams ==
=== Automatically qualified ===
- Australia
- China
- Japan
- North Korea
- South Korea

=== Qualified via competition ===
- Thailand
