= Chương Thị Kiều =

Vietnamese footballer (born 1995)

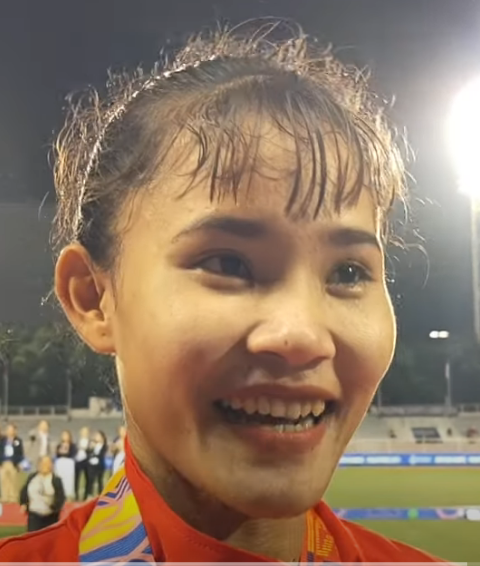
- Kiều in 2019

Personal information
- Date of birth: 19 August 1995 (age 31)
- Place of birth: Gò Quao, Kiên Giang, Vietnam
- Height: 1.66 m (5 ft 5 in)
- Position: Center-back

Team information
- Current team: Hồ Chí Minh City I
- Number: 19

Senior career*
Years	Team	Apps	(Gls)
2013–	Hồ Chí Minh City I	152	(8)

International career^{‡}
2011–	Vietnam	98	(5)
- * Club domestic league appearances and goals ‡ National team caps and goals as of 7 July 2023

Chương Thị Kiều (born 19 August 1995) is a Vietnamese footballer who plays as a center-back for V-Women's League club Hồ Chí Minh City I and the Vietnam women's national team.

== International apps ==
As of match played 19 August 2025

Appearances and goals by national team and year
National Team	Year	Apps	Goals
Vietnam	2011	4	1
Vietnam	2012	4	1
Vietnam	2013	0	0
Vietnam	2014	4	0
Vietnam	2015	12	0
Vietnam	2016	13	0
Vietnam	2017	8	0
Vietnam	2018	13	0
Vietnam	2019	14	0
Vietnam	2020	0	0
Vietnam	2021	2	1
Vietnam	2022	15	1
Vietnam	2023	3	0
Vietnam	2024	1	0
Vietnam	2025	5	1
Total		98	5

== International goals ==
=== Vietnam U16 ===
No.	Date	Venue	Opponent	Score	Result	Competition
1.	15 October 2010	UMAK Stadium, Makati, Philippines	Singapore	5–0	9–0	2011 AFC U-16 Women's Championship qualification
2.	15 October 2010	UMAK Stadium, Makati, Philippines	Singapore	7–0	9–0	2011 AFC U-16 Women's Championship qualification
3.	17 October 2010	UMAK Stadium, Makati, Philippines	Timor-Leste	1–0	16–0	2011 AFC U-16 Women's Championship qualification
4.	17 October 2010	UMAK Stadium, Makati, Philippines	Timor-Leste	2–0	16–0	2011 AFC U-16 Women's Championship qualification
5.	17 October 2010	UMAK Stadium, Makati, Philippines	Timor-Leste	8–0	16–0	2011 AFC U-16 Women's Championship qualification
6.	17 October 2010	UMAK Stadium, Makati, Philippines	Timor-Leste	10–0	16–0	2011 AFC U-16 Women's Championship qualification
7.	22 October 2010	UMAK Stadium, Makati, Philippines	Philippines	1–0	3–0	2011 AFC U-16 Women's Championship qualification
8.	24 October 2010	UMAK Stadium, Makati, Philippines	Guam	5–0	5–0	2011 AFC U-16 Women's Championship qualification

=== National team ===
No.	Date	Venue	Opponent	Score	Result	Competition
1.	25 October 2011	New Laos National Stadium, Vientiane, Laos	Laos	4–0	6–0	2011 AFF Women's Championship
2.	17 September 2012	Thống Nhất Stadium, Hồ Chí Minh City, Vietnam	Myanmar	2–1	2–1	2012 AFF Women's Championship
3.	23 September 2021	Pamir Stadium, Dushanbe, Tajikistan	Maldives	6–0	16–0	2022 AFC Women's Asian Cup qualification
4.	6 February 2022	DY Patil Stadium, Navi Mumbai, India	Chinese Taipei	1–0	2–1	2022 AFC Women's Asian Cup
5.	2 July 2025	Việt Trì Stadium, Việt Trì, Vietnam	United Arab Emirates	1–0	6–0	2026 AFC Women's Asian Cup qualification

=== Hồ Chí Minh City ===
No.	Date	Venue	Opponent	Score	Result	Competition
1.	22 March 2025	Thống Nhất Stadium, Hồ Chí Minh City, Vietnam	(United Arab Emirates) Abu Dhabi Country Club	2–3	5–4	2024–25 AFC Women's Champions League
