= Zomorod Soleimani =

Iranian footballer (born 1980)

Personal information
- Full name: Zomorod Soleimani
- Date of birth: 6 September 1980 (age 46)
- Place of birth: Dehloran, Ilam, Iran
- Position: Goalkeeper

Team information
- Current team: Sepahan
- Number: 1

Senior career*
| Years | Team | Apps | (Gls) |
- Sepahan

International career^{‡}
| 2017 | Iran | 1 | (0) |
- * Club domestic league appearances and goals ‡ National team caps and goals as of 11 April 2017

Zomorod Soleimani (Persian: زمرد سلیمانی; born 6 September 1980) is an Iranian footballer who plays as a goalkeeper for Kowsar Women Football League club Sepahan Isfahan and the senior Iran women's national team.

== International career ==
Soleimani capped at senior level during the 2018 AFC Women's Asian Cup qualification.
