= Melika Mohammadi =

Iranian footballer (2000–2023)

Personal information
- Date of birth: 28 March 2000
- Place of birth: Shiraz, Iran
- Date of death: 24 December 2023 (aged 23)
- Place of death: Bam, Iran
- Height: 1.71 m (5 ft 7 in)
- Positions: Right back; centre back

College career
Years	Team	Apps	(Gls)
- Emory University

Senior career*
Years	Team	Apps	(Gls)
- Bam Khatoon F.C.

International career
2018–2019	Iran U19	5	(0)
2021–2023	Iran	5	(0)
- * Club domestic league appearances and goals

Melika Mohammadi (Persian: ملیکه محمدی, 28 March 2000 – 24 December 2023) was an Iranian footballer who played as a right back or centre back for the Iran women's national team. She played for Bam Khatoon F.C. in the Kowsar Women Football League.

== College career ==
Mohammadi attended Walt Whitman High School in Bethesda, Maryland and played college soccer for Emory University.

== International career ==
Mohammadi capped for Iran at senior level during the 2022 AFC Women's Asian Cup qualification.

== Personal life and death ==
Melika Mohammadi was born in Shiraz on 28 March 2000. She died in a road accident at the entrance of Bam city on the morning of 24 December 2023 at the age of 23. Two of her teammates, Behnaz Taherkhani and Zahra Khajavi, were injured in the same accident and were hospitalized.
