= Vahideh Isari =

Iranian footballer (born 1986)

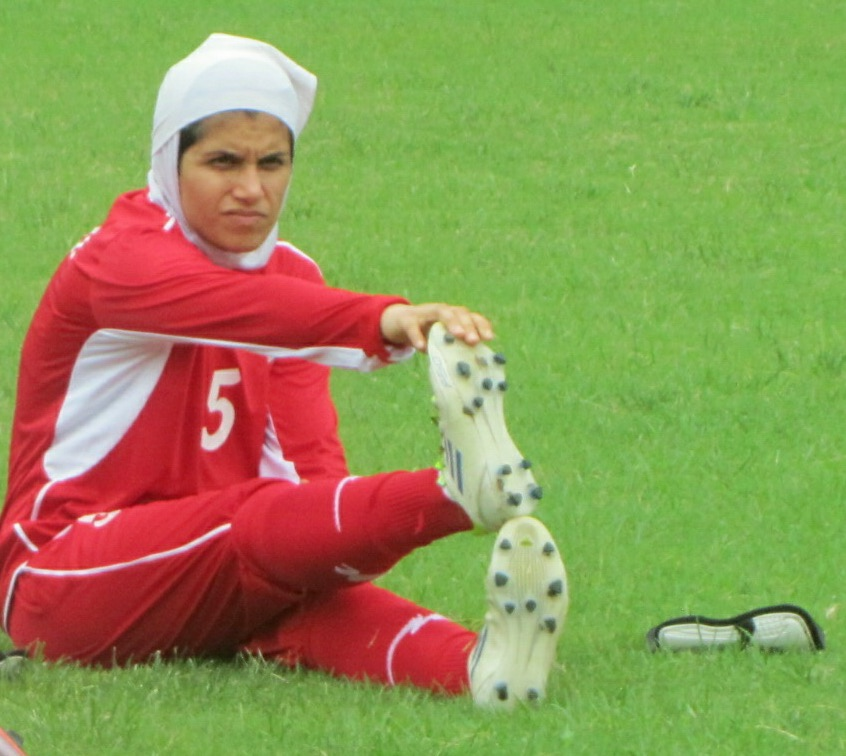

Personal information
- Full name: Vahideh Isari
- Date of birth: 19 September 1986 (age 40)
- Place of birth: Kordkuy, Iran
- Height: 1.70 m (5 ft 7 in)
- Position: Defender

Team information
- Current team: Zobahan Isfahan
- Number: 7

Senior career*
Years	Team	Apps	(Gls)
- Zobahan Isfahan

International career^{‡}
2013–2017	Iran	2	(0)
- * Club domestic league appearances and goals ‡ National team caps and goals as of 11 April 2017

Vahideh Isari (Persian: وحیده ایثاری; born 19 September 1986) is an Iranian footballer who plays as a defender for Kowsar Women Football League club Zobahan Isfahan. She has been a member of the senior Iran women's national team.
