= Mahdiyeh Molaei =

Iranian footballer (born 1991)

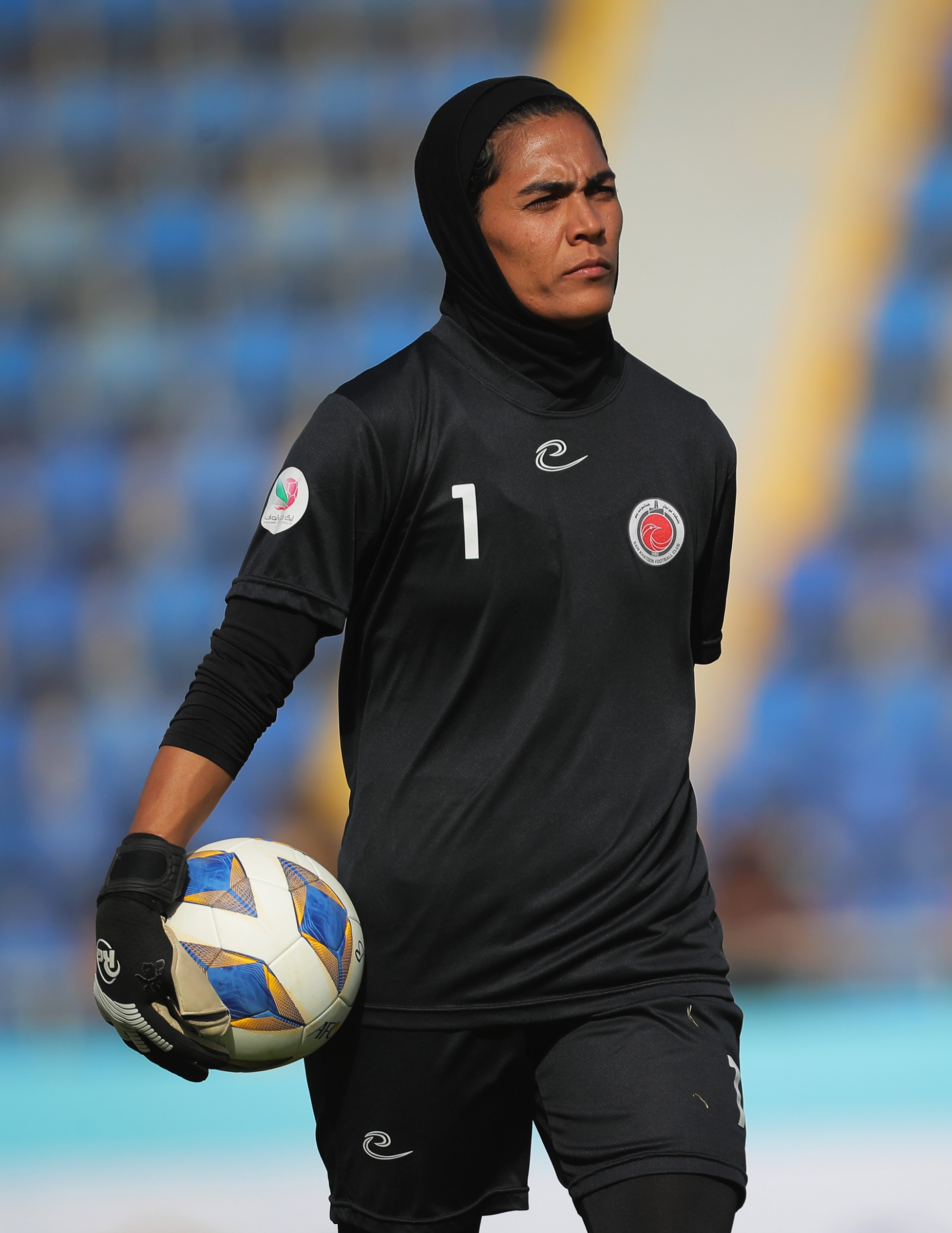
- Mahdiyeh Molaei plays for Bam Khatoon F.C

Personal information
- Full name: Mahdiyeh Molaei Sarbijan
- Date of birth: 29 January 1991 (age 35)
- Place of birth: Jiroft, Iran
- Position: Goalkeeper

Team information
- Current team: Bam Khatoon F.C

Youth career
- Bam Khatoon F.C

Senior career*
Years	Team	Apps	(Gls)
- Bam Khatoon F.C

International career^{‡}
2016	Iran	1	(0)
- * Club domestic league appearances and goals ‡ National team caps and goals as of 11 April 2017

Mahdiyeh Molaei Sarbijan (born 29 January 1991), known as Mahdiyeh Molaei (Persian: مهدیه مولایی), is an Iranian footballer who plays as a goalkeeper for Kowsar Women Football League club Bam Khatoon F.C. She has also played for the Iran women's national team.
