= Chang Su-hsin =

Taiwanese footballer (born 1990)

Personal information
- Date of birth: 4 October 1990 (age 36)
- Place of birth: Taipei City, Taiwan
- Height: 1.67 m (5 ft 6 in)
- Position: Defender

Senior career*
Years	Team	Apps	(Gls)
2019	Hualien		
2020	Okayama Yunogo Belle		
2021–2023	New Taipei		
2023–2024	Ryukyu Deigos		
2024 –	Grano Isesaki SC		

International career^{‡}
2016–	Chinese Taipei	15	(2)
- * Club domestic league appearances and goals ‡ National team caps and goals as of 17 October 2023

Chang Su-hsin (Chinese: 張愫心; born 4 October 1990) is a Taiwanese footballer who plays as a defender for the Chinese Taipei women's national team.

== International goals ==
No.	Date	Venue	Opponent	Score	Result	Competition
1.	5 April 2023	Fouad Chehab Stadium, Jounieh, Lebanon	Lebanon	2–1	5–1	2024 AFC Women's Olympic Qualifying Tournament
2.	5 April 2023	Fouad Chehab Stadium, Jounieh, Lebanon	Lebanon	4–1	5–1	2024 AFC Women's Olympic Qualifying Tournament
