= Maryam Irandoost =

Iranian footballer and manager

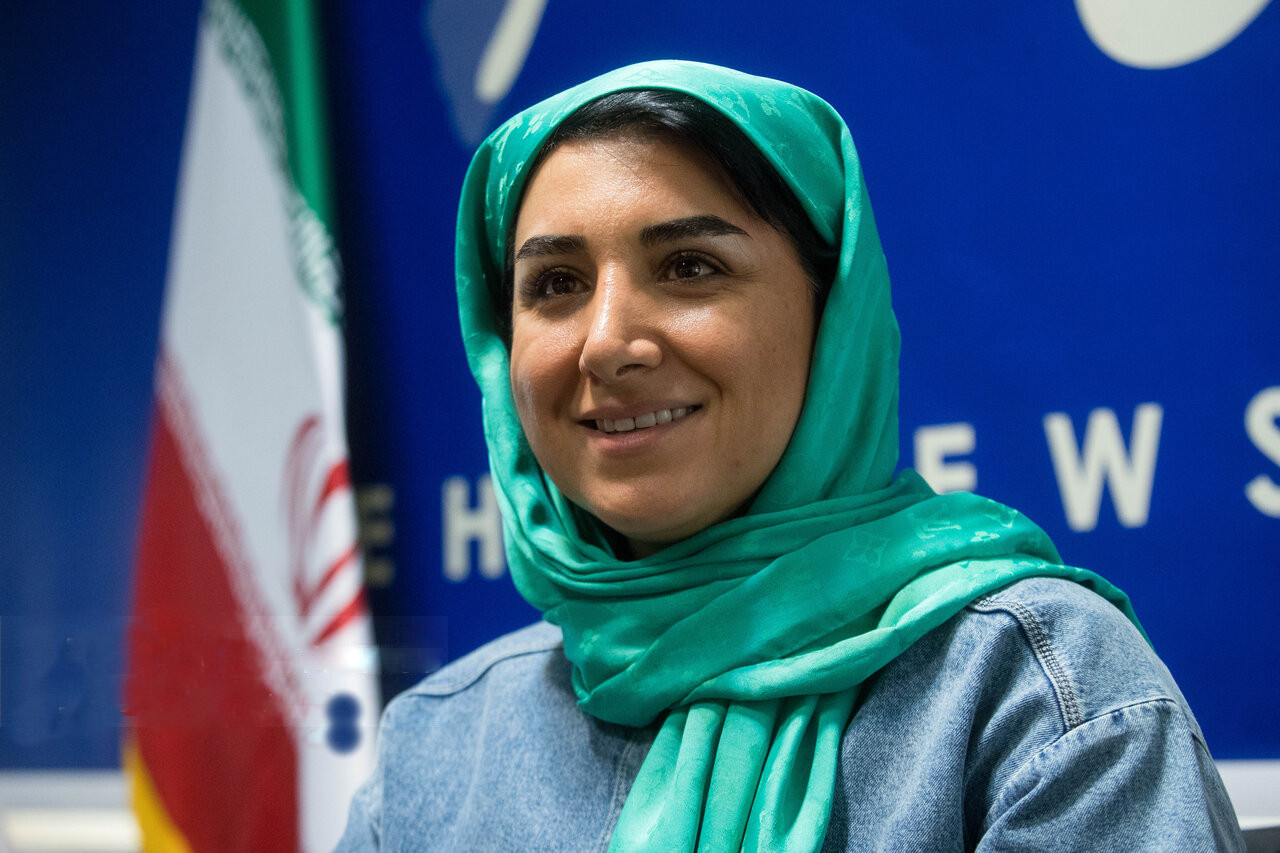
- Irandoost in 2021

Personal information
- Full name: Maryam Irandoost
- Date of birth: 3 February 1979 (age 47)
- Place of birth: Bandar Anzali, Iran

Team information
- Current team: Esteghlal (manager)

Senior career*
| Years | Team | Apps | (Gls) |
| 1998–2000 | Pegah Gilan | | |
| 1991–2003 | Malavan | | |

International career
| 1995–2002 | Iran | | |

Managerial career
- 2005–2008: Malavan
- 2008–2010: Iran (assistant)
- 2009–2010: Iran U-16
- 2010–2012: Iran
- 2012–2014: Malavan
- 2021–2022: Iran
- 2026–: Esteghlal
- * Club domestic league appearances and goals

Maryam Irandoost (Persian: مریم ایراندوست; born February 3, 1979) is an Iranian former professional football player and manager who is currently head coach of Esteghlal F.C.,she was head coach of the Iran national team, she was head coach of Malavan and Iran women's national under-16 football team in advance. She played for Pegah Gilan and Malavan. She is the daughter of former Malavan's head coach Nosrat Irandoost.

== Personal life ==
On 23 January 2026, Irandoost responded to the killing of former footballer Milad Mianehkhah Monfaredi during the 2025–2026 Iranian protests on her Instagram, stating: "We arranged a [posthumous] wedding for you, because your mother wished it."
