= Yasaman Farmani =

Iranian footballer (born 1995)

Personal information
- Date of birth: 12 February 1995 (age 31)
- Place of birth: Ardabil, Iran
- Height: 1.70 m (5 ft 7 in)
- Position: Midfielder

Senior career*
Years	Team	Apps	(Gls)
2020–2022	Charleroi	22	(0)

International career^{‡}
2021–	Iran	6	(0)
- * Club domestic league appearances and goals as of 15 October 2021 ‡ National team caps and goals as of 25 September 2021

Yasaman Farmani (Persian: یاسمن فرمانی; born 12 February 1995) is an Iranian footballer who plays as a midfielder. She has been capped by the Iran women's national team.

== Club career ==
Farmani has played for Charleroi in Belgium from 2020 to 2022.

== International career ==
Farmani capped for Iran at senior level during the 2022 AFC Women's Asian Cup qualification.

== Personal life ==
Farmani married fellow Iranian footballer Ali Gholizadeh in February 2019.
