= Elham Farahmand =

Iranian footballer (born 1993)

Personal information
- Full name: Elham Farahmand Souderjani
- Date of birth: 12 September 1993 (age 33)
- Place of birth: Falavarjan, Isfahan, Iran
- Position: Midfielder

Team information
- Current team: Vachan Kurdistan
- Number: 47

Senior career*
Years	Team	Apps	(Gls)
- Vachan Kurdistan

International career^{‡}
2017–	Iran	7	(0)
- * Club domestic league appearances and goals ‡ National team caps and goals as of 9 April 2019

Elham Farahmand Souderjani (Persian: الهام فرهمند, born 12 September 1993), known as Elham Farahmand, is an Iranian footballer who plays as a midfielder for Kowsar Women Football League club Vachan Kurdistan and the Iran women's national team.
