= Zohreh Koudaei =

Iranian footballer (born 1989)

- Zohreh Koudaei with Zob Ahan in 2019

Personal information
- Full name: Zohreh Koudaei
- Date of birth: 24 November 1989 (age 36)
- Place of birth: Ahvaz, Iran
- Position: Goalkeeper

Senior career*
Years	Team	Apps	(Gls)
- Zob Ahan

International career^{‡}
2007–	Iran		
- * Club domestic league appearances and goals ‡ National team caps and goals as of 01:46, 17 November 2021 (UTC)

Zohreh Koudaei (Persian: زهره کودایی; born 24 November 1989) is an Iranian footballer who plays as a goalkeeper for the Iran women's national team.

== International career ==
Koudaei participated with the Iran national team in their qualification campaign for the 2022 AFC Women's Asian Cup qualification. She helped defeat Jordan in a decisive match, saving two penalties in penalty shoot-outs, to qualify Iran to the final tournament for the first time.

== Jordan Football Association sex verification ==
In November 2021, she attracted global attention when the Jordan Football Association (JFA), after losing a match in the 2022 AFC Women's Asian Cup qualification to Iran, accused her of being a male. The JFA filed a request for sex verification with the Asian Football Confederation. Koudaei announced her intention to file a complaint to FIFA against Jordan to restore her reputation.

== Personal life ==
On 5 January 2026, Koudaei publicly supported the 2025–2026 Iranian protests on her Instagram, stating: "Write in history that there was a land that had a square called Azadi, its bank was called Ayandeh, and its stores were called Refah, but its people had none of these."
