= Melika Motevalli =

Iranian footballer (born 1998)

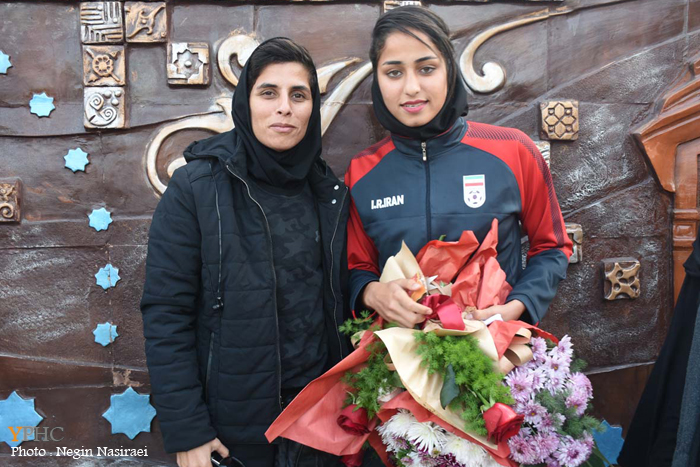
- Melika Motevalli in 2018

Personal information
- Full name: Melika Motevalli Taher
- Date of birth: 6 May 1998 (age 28)
- Place of birth: Babol, Iran
- Position: Defender

Team information
- Current team: Shahrdari Sirjan
- Number: 4

Senior career*
Years	Team	Apps	(Gls)
- Shahrdari Sirjan

International career^{‡}
2012	Iran U16		
2014–2016	Iran U19	3+	(0)
2018–	Iran	7	(1)
- * Club domestic league appearances and goals ‡ National team caps and goals as of 9 April 2019

Melika Motevalli Taher (Persian: ملیکا متولی, born 6 May 1998), known as Melika Motevalli, is an Iranian footballer who plays as a defender for Kowsar Women Football League club Shahrdari Sirjan and the Iran women's national team.

== International goals ==
Scores and results list Iran's goal tally first.

No.	Date	Venue	Opponent	Score	Result	Competition
1.	8 November 2018	IPE Chonburi Stadium, Chonburi, Thailand	Lebanon	7–0	8–0	2020 AFC Women's Olympic Qualifying Tournament
2.	29 November 2018	Milliy Stadium, Tashkent, Uzbekistan	Tajikistan	4–1	4–1	2018 CAFA Women's Championship
3.	19 September 2021	Milliy Stadium, Tashkent, Uzbekistan	Bangladesh	1–0	5–0	2022 AFC Women's Asian Cup qualification
4.	14 July 2022	Pamir Stadium, Dushanbe, Tajikistan	Tajikistan	3–0	5–0	2022 CAFA Women's Championship
5.	17 July 2022	Pamir Stadium, Dushanbe, Tajikistan	Turkmenistan	2–0	4–0	2022 CAFA Women's Championship
6.	12 November 2022	Ararat Stadium, Tehran, Iran	Belarus	1–0	1–1	Friendly
