= Afsaneh Chatrenoor =

Iranian footballer (born 1998)

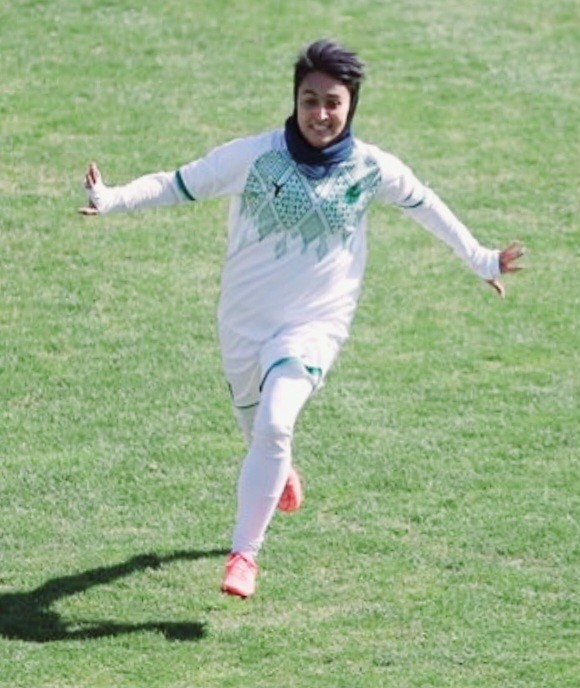

Personal information
- Full name: Afsaneh Chatrenoor
- Date of birth: 14 April 1998 (age 28)
- Place of birth: Zanjan, Iran
- Position: Striker

Team information
- Current team: Shahrdari Sirjan
- Number: 7

Senior career*
Years	Team	Apps	(Gls)
- Shahrdari Sirjan

International career^{‡}
2012	Iran U16		(0)
2014–2016	Iran U19	3+	(0)
2017–	Iran	7	(0)
- * Club domestic league appearances and goals ‡ National team caps and goals as of 12 February 2019

Afsaneh Chatrenoor (Persian: افسانه چترنور; born 14 April 1998 in Zanjan) is an Iranian footballer who plays as a striker for Kowsar Women Football League club Golgohar Sirjan. She has been a member of the Iran women's national team.

== International goals ==
No.	Date	Venue	Opponent	Score	Result	Competition
1.	14 July 2022	Pamir Stadium, Dushanbe, Tajikistan	Tajikistan	1–0	5–0	2022 CAFA Women's Championship
2.	14 July 2022	Pamir Stadium, Dushanbe, Tajikistan	Tajikistan	5–0	5–0	2022 CAFA Women's Championship
3.	17 July 2022	Pamir Stadium, Dushanbe, Tajikistan	Turkmenistan	3–0	4–0	2022 CAFA Women's Championship
4.	5 April 2023	Thuwunna Stadium, Yangon, Myanmar	Myanmar	1–0	1–0	2024 AFC Women's Olympic Qualifying Tournament
5.	1 December 2024	Petra Stadium, Amman, Jordan	Jordan	1–1	2–1	Friendly
6.	10 June 2025	National Football Center Field 2, Tehran, Iran	Iraq	4–0	8–0	Friendly
7.	10 June 2025	National Football Center Field 2, Tehran, Iran	Iraq	?–0	8–0	Friendly
8.	10 June 2025	National Football Center Field 2, Tehran, Iran	Iraq	?–0	8–0	Friendly
