= Samaneh Chahkandi =

Iranian footballer (born 1989)

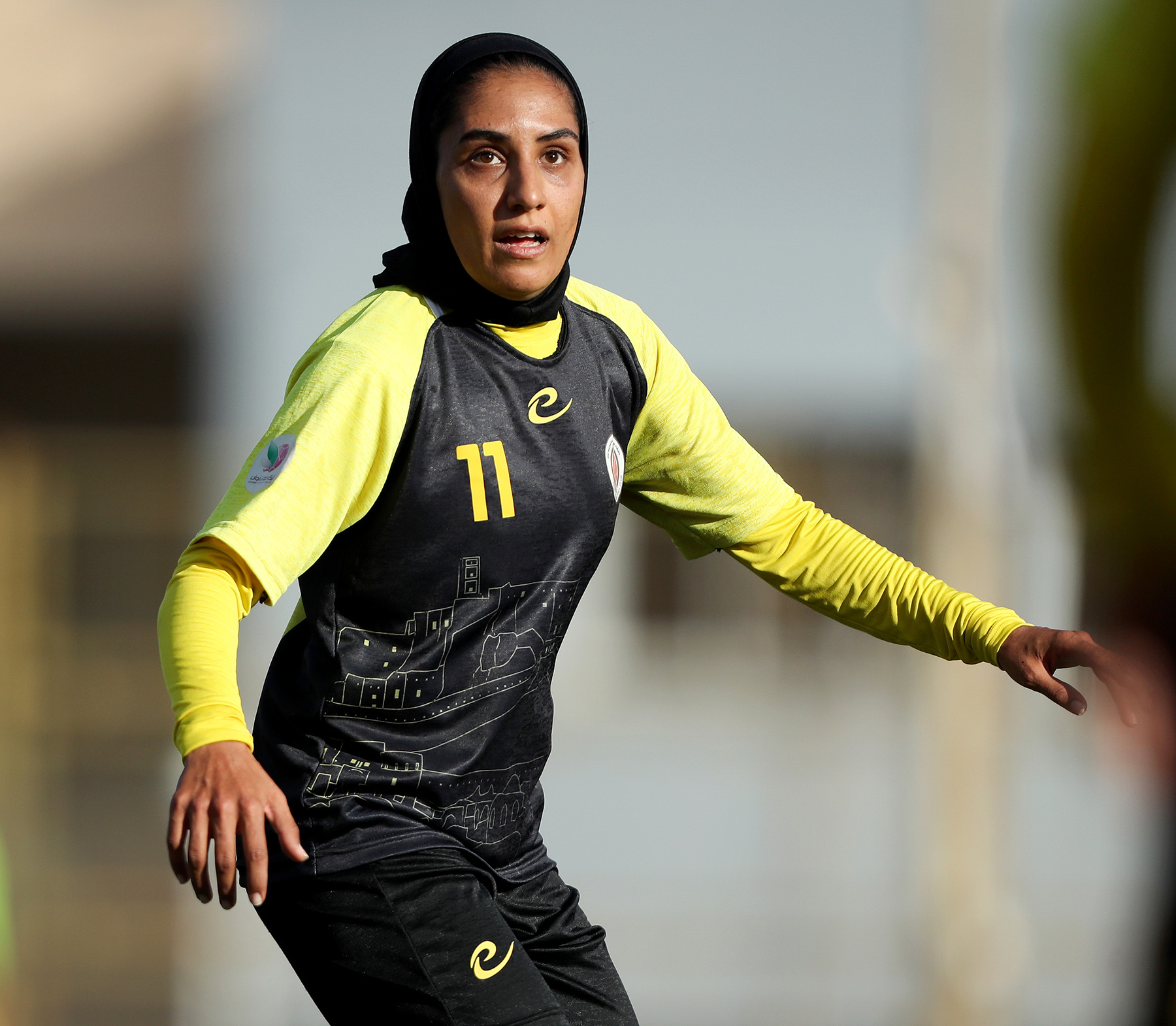
- Chahkandi with Bam Khatoon in 2021

Personal information
- Full name: Samaneh Chahkandi
- Date of birth: 28 March 1989 (age 37)
- Place of birth: Mashhad, Iran
- Position: Midfielder

Team information
- Current team: Bam Khatoon
- Number: 11

Senior career*
Years	Team	Apps	(Gls)
- Bam Khatoon

International career^{‡}
2017–	Iran	10	(3)
- * Club domestic league appearances and goals ‡ National team caps and goals as of 9 April 2019

Samaneh Chahkandi (Persian: سمانه چهکندی; born 28 March 1989 in Mashhad) is an Iranian footballer who plays as a midfielder for Kowsar Women Football League club Bam Khatoon and the Iran women's national team.

== International goals ==
She was part of Iran's squad at the 2020 AFC women's Olympic Qualifying Tournament, where she scored twice for the national team.

No.	Date	Venue	Opponent	Score	Result	Competition
1.	8 November 2018	Institute of Physical Education Stadium, Chonburi, Thailand	Lebanon	1–0	8–0	2020 AFC Women's Olympic Qualifying Tournament
2.	8 November 2018	Institute of Physical Education Stadium, Chonburi, Thailand	Lebanon	3–0	8–0	2020 AFC Women's Olympic Qualifying Tournament
3.	29 November 2018	Milliy Stadium, Tashkent, Uzbekistan	Tajikistan	2–1	4–1	2018 CAFA Women's Championship
4.	6 April 2019	Saoud bin Abdulrahman Stadium, Al Wakrah, Qatar	Palestine	1–0	9–0	2020 AFC Women's Olympic Qualifying Tournament
