= Hajar Dabbaghi =

Iranian footballer (born 1999)

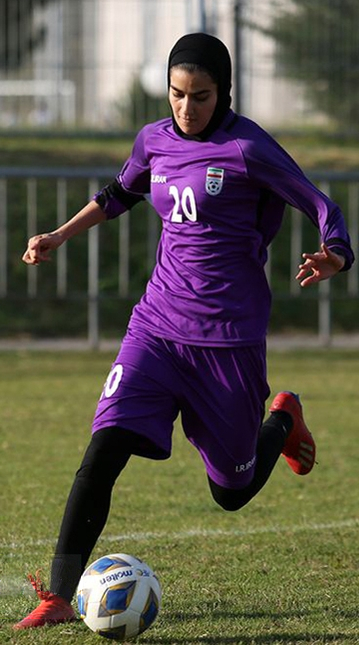
- Hajar Dabbaghi in 2021

Personal information
- Full name: Hajar Dabbaghi Ashrafi Varnosfaderani هاجر دباغی اشرفی ورنوسفادرانی
- Date of birth: 22 March 1999 (age 27)
- Place of birth: Khomeyni Shahr, Isfahan, Iran
- Height: 1.77 m (5 ft 10 in)
- Position: Forward

Team information
- Current team: Sepahan Isfahan

Senior career*
| Years | Team | Apps | (Gls) |
| –2023 | Sepahan Isfahan | | |
| 2023 | Gokulam Kerala | | |
| 2023– | Sepahan Isfahan | | |

International career^{‡}
| 2014 | Iran U16 | | (1) |
| 2018– | Iran | 8 | (5) |
- * Club domestic league appearances and goals ‡ National team caps and goals as of 9 April 2019

Hajar Dabbaghi Ashrafi Varnosfaderani (Persian: هاجر دباغی اشرفی ورنوسفادرانی; born 22 March 1999), known as Hajar Dabbaghi (هاجر دباغی), is an Iranian footballer who plays as a forward for the Kowsar Women Football League club Sepahan SC and the Iran women's national team.

== Career ==
In 2021, she represented Gokulam Kerala in the AFC Women's Club Championship.

== International goals ==
| No. | Date | Venue | Opponent | Score | Result | Competition |
|---|---|---|---|---|---|---|
| 1. | 8 November 2018 | IPE Chonburi Campus Stadium, Chonburi, Thailand | Lebanon | 5–0 | 8–0 | 2020 AFC Women's Olympic Qualifying Tournament |
| 2. | 8 November 2018 | IPE Chonburi Campus Stadium, Chonburi, Thailand | Lebanon | 8–0 | 8–0 | 2020 AFC Women's Olympic Qualifying Tournament |
| 3. | 13 November 2018 | IPE Chonburi Campus Stadium, Chonburi, Thailand | Hong Kong | 1–1 | 1–1 | 2020 AFC Women's Olympic Qualifying Tournament |
| 4. | 6 April 2019 | Saoud bin Abdulrahman Stadium, Al Wakrah, Qatar | Palestine | 2–0 | 9–0 | 2020 AFC Women's Olympic Qualifying Tournament |
| 5. | 6 April 2019 | Saoud bin Abdulrahman Stadium, Al Wakrah, Qatar | Palestine | 3–0 | 9–0 | 2020 AFC Women's Olympic Qualifying Tournament |
| 6. | 22 September 2021 | Milliy Stadium, Tashkent, Uzbekistan | Bangladesh | 4–0 | 5–0 | 2022 AFC Women's Asian Cup qualification |
