= Fatemeh Amineh =

Iranian footballer (born 1997)

Fatemeh Amineh Borazjani
Personal information
- Date of birth: 3 June 1997 (age 29)
- Place of birth: Borazjan, Bushehr, Iran
- Position: Defender

Team information
- Current team: Shahrdari Sirjan
- Number: 11

Senior career*
Years	Team	Apps	(Gls)
- Shahrdari Sirjan

International career^{‡}
201?	Iran U14		
201?	Iran U16		(2)
201?	Iran U19		
2019	Iran U23	1+	(1+)
2018–	Iran	8	(0)
- * Club domestic league appearances and goals ‡ National team caps and goals as of 9 April 2019

Fatemeh Amineh Borazjani (Persian: فاطمه امینه برازجانی; born 3 June 1997 in Borazjan) is an Iranian footballer who plays as a defender for Kowsar Women Football League club Shahrdari Sirjan and the Iran women's national team.

== International career ==
Amineh Borazjani represented Iran at the 2013 AFC U-16 Women's Championship qualification, scoring twice. At senior level, she capped during the 2020 AFC Women's Olympic Qualifying Tournament.
