= Fatemeh Adeli =

Iranian footballer (born 1995)

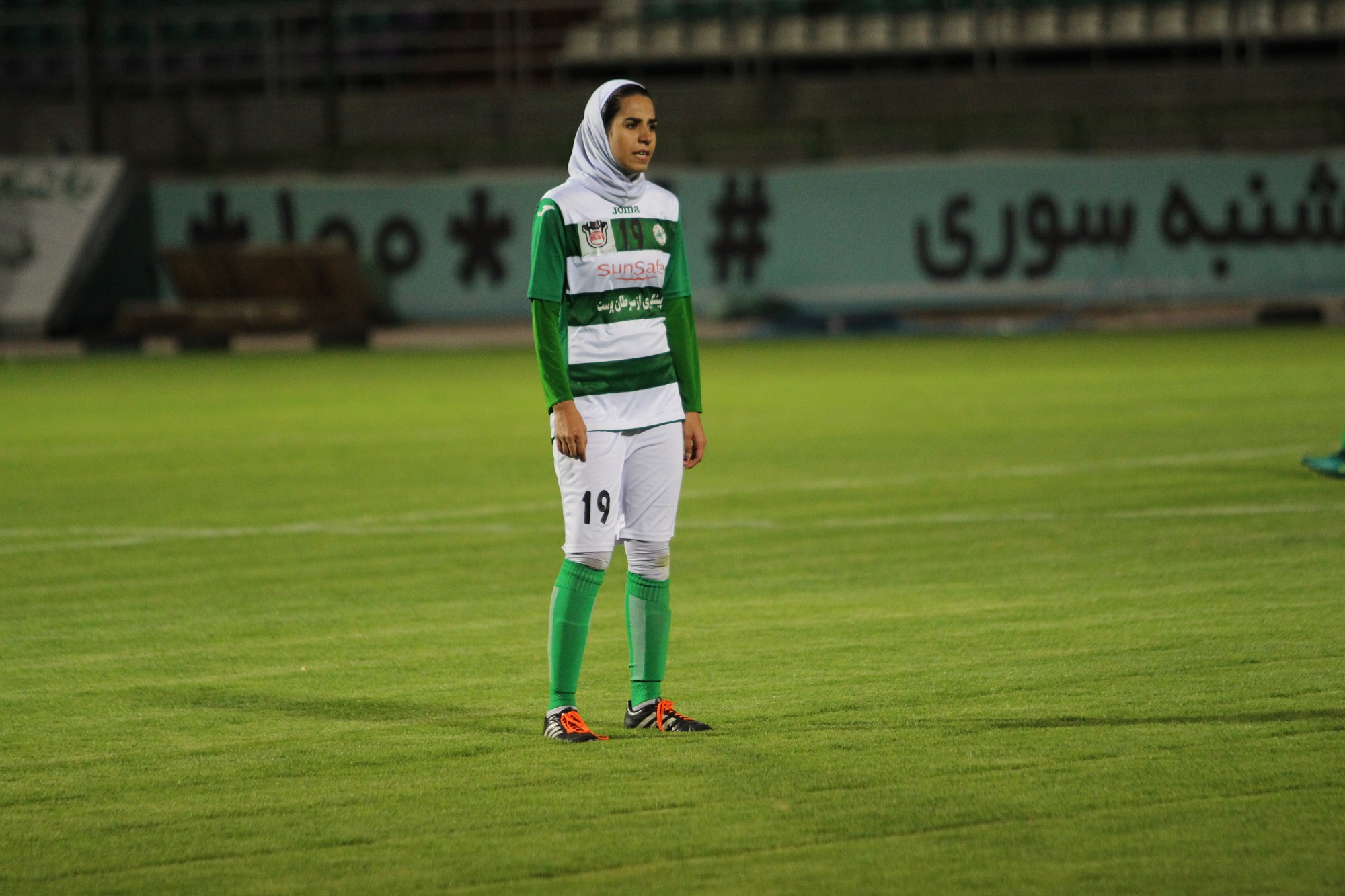
- Adeli with Sepahan in 2019

Personal information
- Full name: Fatemeh Adeli
- Date of birth: 16 July 1995 (age 31)
- Place of birth: Shahin Shahr, Isfahan, Iran
- Height: 1.74 m (5 ft 9 in)
- Position: Defender

Team information
- Current team: Sepahan Isfahan
- Number: 19

Senior career*
Years	Team	Apps	(Gls)
–2024	Sepahan Isfahan		
2024–	Pyunik W		

International career^{‡}
2010	Iran U15		
2010	Iran U16		
2012	Iran U19	1+	(0)
2017–	Iran	5	(0)
- * Club domestic league appearances and goals ‡ National team caps and goals as of 9 April 2019

Fatemeh Adeli (Persian: فاطمه عادلی; born 16 July 1995) is an Iranian footballer who plays as a defender for Pyunik Women as well as the Iran women's national team.

== Career ==
On 15 July 2024, Pyunik announced the signing of Adeli to their women's team.
