= Sara Zohrabi =

Iranian footballer (born 1996)

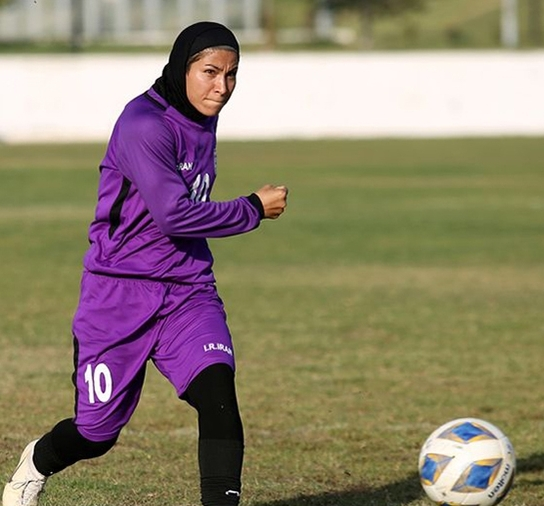
- Sara Zohrabi in 2021

Personal information
- Full name: Sara Zohrabi Nia
- Date of birth: 13 November 1996 (age 30)
- Place of birth: Izeh, Khuzestan, Iran
- Position: Midfielder

Team information
- Current team: Heyat Alborz
- Number: 10

Senior career*
Years	Team	Apps	(Gls)
- Heyat Alborz

International career^{‡}
2009	Iran U14		
2010	Iran U16		(1)
2012–2014	Iran U19		(3)
2016–	Iran	10	(5)
- * Club domestic league appearances and goals ‡ National team caps and goals as of 9 April 2019

Sara Zohrabi Nia (Persian: سارا ظهرابی نیا; born 13 November 1996), known as Sara Zohrabi (Persian: سارا ظهرابی), is an Iranian footballer who plays as a midfielder for Kowsar Women Football League club Heyat Football Alborz and the Iran women's national team.

== International goals ==
No.	Date	Venue	Opponent	Score	Result	Competition
1.	11 April 2017	Vietnam YFT Center, Hanoi, Vietnam	Syria	2–0	12–0	2018 AFC Women's Asian Cup qualification
2.	11 April 2017	Vietnam YFT Center, Hanoi, Vietnam	Syria	4–0	12–0	2018 AFC Women's Asian Cup qualification
3.	11 April 2017	Vietnam YFT Center, Hanoi, Vietnam	Syria	6–0	12–0	2018 AFC Women's Asian Cup qualification
4.	11 April 2017	Vietnam YFT Center, Hanoi, Vietnam	Syria	7–0	12–0	2018 AFC Women's Asian Cup qualification
5.	11 April 2017	Vietnam YFT Center, Hanoi, Vietnam	Syria	10–0	12–0	2018 AFC Women's Asian Cup qualification
