= Behnaz Taherkhani =

Iranian footballer (born 1995)

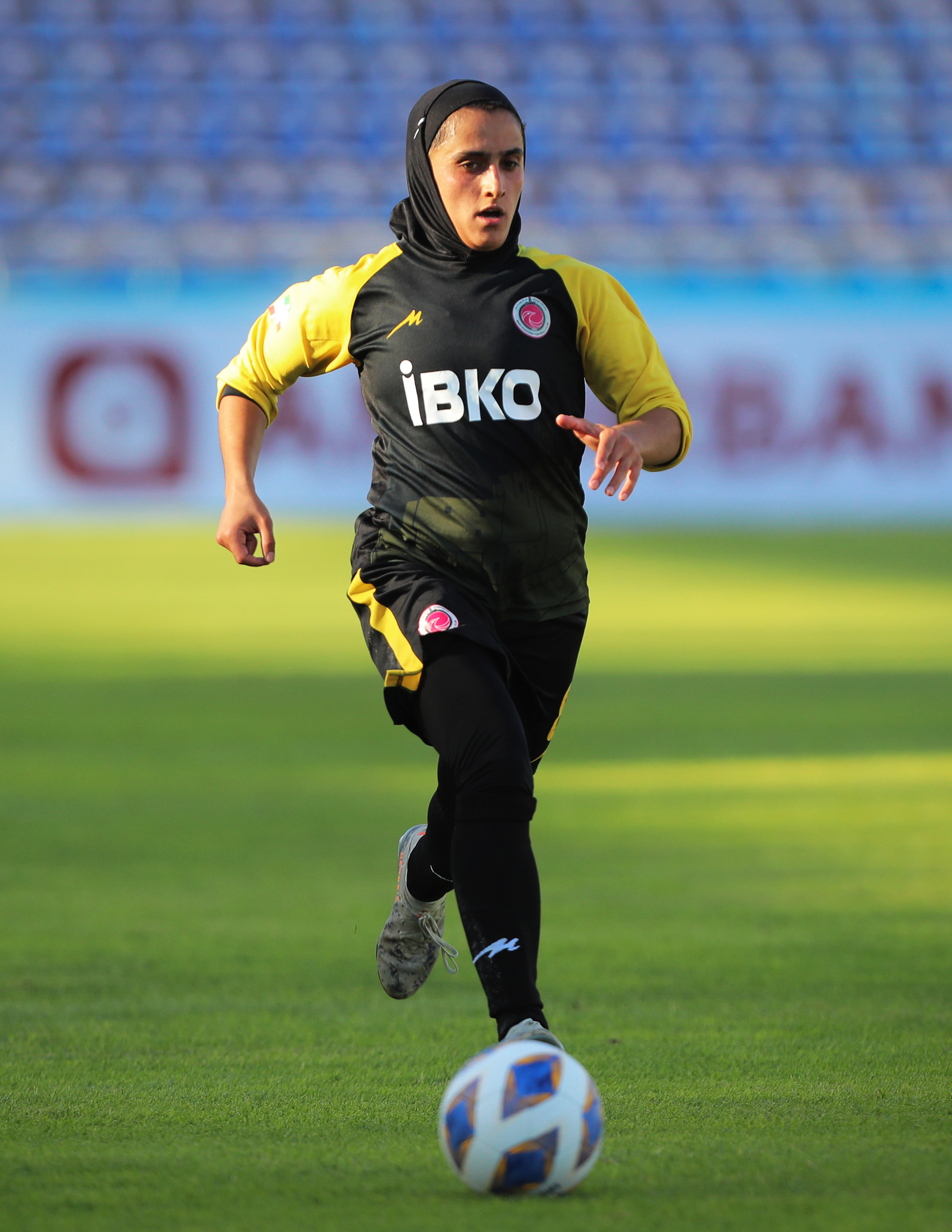
- Behnaz Taherkhani playing for Bam Khatoon F.C in the AFC Women's Club Championship

Personal information
- Full name: Behnaz Taherkhani
- Date of birth: 22 May 1995 (age 31)
- Place of birth: Takestan, Qazvin, Iran
- Position: Defender

Team information
- Current team: Bam Khatoon
- Number: 4

Senior career*
Years	Team	Apps	(Gls)
- Bam Khatoon

International career^{‡}
2010	Iran U15		
2010	Iran U16	3+	(3)
2012	Iran U19	1+	(0)
2018–	Iran	6	(0)
- * Club domestic league appearances and goals ‡ National team caps and goals as of 9 April 2019

Behnaz Taherkhani (Persian: بهناز طاهرخانی; born 22 May 1995) is an Iranian footballer who plays as a defender for Kowsar Women Football League club Bam Khatoon and the Iran women's national team.

== International goals ==
No.	Date	Venue	Opponent	Score	Result	Competition
1.	22 September 2021	Milliy Stadium, Tashkent, Uzbekistan	Bangladesh	3–0	5–0	2022 AFC Women's Asian Cup qualification
2.	22 September 2021	Milliy Stadium, Tashkent, Uzbekistan	Bangladesh	5–0	5–0	2022 AFC Women's Asian Cup qualification
