= 2018 AFF Women's Championship squads =

Below are the squads for the 2018 AFF Women's Championship, hosted by Indonesia, which is taking place between 30 June - 13 July 2018.

== Group A ==
=== Australia U20 ===
Head coach: Leah Blayney

The Australian U20 (Young Matildas) squad was announced on 20 June 2018.

No.	Pos.	Player	Date of birth (age)	Caps	Goals	Club
1	GK	Jada Mathyssen-Whyman	24 October 1999 (aged 18)	8	0	(Football Australia) Western Sydney Wanderers
12	GK	Annalee Grove	15 June 2001 (aged 17)	2	0	(Football Australia) Emerging Jets
18	GK	Morgan Aquino	4 August 2001 (aged 16)	0	0	(Football Australia) Football West
2	DF	Emily Hodgson	1 July 2000 (aged 17)	0	0	(Football Australia) Adelaide United
4	DF	Tori Tumeth	4 March 2001 (aged 17)	0	0	(Football Australia) Football NSW
11	DF	Kaitlyn Torpey	17 March 2000 (aged 18)	5	0	(Football Australia) Brisbane Roar
13	DF	Angelique Hristodoulou	17 September 2001 (aged 16)	1	0	(Football Australia) Sydney FC
23	DF	Holly McNamara	23 January 2003 (aged 15)	0	0	(Football Australia) Football NSW
3	MF	Susan Phonsongkham	12 February 2001 (aged 17)	3	0	(Football Australia) Western Sydney Wanderers
5	MF	Rachel Lowe	19 November 2000 (aged 17)	6	2	(Football Australia) Western Sydney Wanderers
6	MF	Amy Sayer	30 November 2001 (aged 16)	7	3	(Football Australia) Canberra United
10	MF	Alex Chidiac	15 January 1999 (aged 19)	19	12	(Football Australia) Adelaide United
14	MF	MelindaJ Barbieri	16 May 2000 (aged 18)	6	4	(Football Australia) Melbourne Victory
15	MF	Taylor Ray	22 April 2001 (aged 17)	2	0	(Football Australia) Sydney FC
16	MF	Mary Fowler	14 February 2003 (aged 15)	1	0	
17	MF	Bethany Gordon	17 July 1998 (aged 19)	1	0	(Football Australia) Canberra United
19	MF	Karly Roestbakken	17 January 2001 (aged 17)	1	0	(Football Australia) Canberra United
21	MF	Courtney Nevin	12 February 2002 (aged 16)	1	0	(Football Australia) Western Sydney Wanderers
7	FW	Princess Ibini	31 January 2000 (aged 18)	20	8	(Football Australia) Sydney FC
8	FW	Emily Condon	1 September 1998 (aged 19)	12	7	(Football Australia) Adelaide United
9	FW	Cortnee Vine	19 April 1998 (aged 20)	8	4	(Football Australia) Newcastle Jets
20	FW	Kyra Cooney-Cross	15 February 2002 (aged 16)	0	0	(Football Australia) Melbourne Victory
22	FW	Larissa Crummer (Captain)	10 January 1996 (aged 22)	6	1	(Football Australia) Melbourne City

=== Cambodia ===
Head coach: Meas Samoeun

No.	Pos.	Player	Date of birth (age)	Club
1	GK	Phoeur Thou		
18	GK	Chea Sompos		
22	GK	Kory Muoykanha		
2	DF	Moul Reaksmeyphe		
3	DF	Chay Sreyleab		
4	DF	Sen Sreyneat		
5	DF	Somrit Nimol		
13	DF	Kim Chanthet		
14	DF	Phoeurn Sreyleak		
20	DF	Pech U Chun Y		
6	MF	Keb Tornsamay		
7	MF	Hout Koem Hong		
8	MF	Tang Makara		
11	MF	Ban Cheavey		
12	MF	Chhorn Sreynit		
15	MF	Poeurn Kumthea		
17	MF	Hin Sreyoun		
21	MF	Hear Sreilas		
9	FW	Yon Yeurn		
10	FW	Sandra Hill		(United States Soccer Federation) Grand Canyon Antelopes
16	FW	Dy Sothea		
19	FW	Lim Sochea		
23	FW	Norn Minea		

=== Malaysia ===
Head coach: Jacob Joseph

The squad was announced on 28 June 2018.

No.	Pos.	Player	Date of birth (age)	Club
1	GK	Dhiya Fatihah Ahmad Razali	25	(Football Association of Malaysia) Kedah
21	GK	Roszaini Bakar	17 October 1990 (aged 27)	(Football Association of Malaysia) ATM
23	GK	Nurul Azurin Mazlan	27 January 2000 (aged 18)	(Football Association of Malaysia) Negeri Sembilan
2	DF	Jessica Sussane Mailu	18	(Football Association of Malaysia) Sabah
3	DF	Mira Fazliana Aidi	25	(Football Association of Malaysia) Kedah
5	DF	Nur Athirah Farhanah Zairi	5 July 1999 (aged 18)	(Football Association of Malaysia) Penang
6	DF	Rozeinie Dusileh	31	(Football Association of Malaysia) PDRM
8	DF	Eslilah Esar	18 July 1989 (aged 28)	(Football Association of Malaysia) Sabah
9	DF	Usliza Usman	20 May 1995 (aged 23)	(Football Association of Malaysia) Sabah
17	DF	Malini Nordin (Captain)	29 December 1985 (aged 32)	(Football Association of Malaysia) Negeri Sembilan
24	DF	Yasrikallaura Tumas	15 October 1996 (aged 21)	(Football Association of Malaysia) Sabah
26	DF	Noor Mianah Balanting	18	(Football Association of Malaysia) Sabah
7	MF	Jaciah Jumilis	23 July 1991 (aged 26)	(Football Association of Malaysia) Sabah
10	MF	Norsuriani Mazli	27 April 1990 (aged 28)	(Football Association of Malaysia) PDRM
14	MF	Nur Shazwina Shuib	22	(Football Association of Malaysia) Kedah
15	MF	Pedrolia Martin Sikayun	18 February 1992 (aged 26)	(Football Association of Malaysia) Sabah
16	MF	Nur Lyana Soberi	19	(Football Association of Malaysia) Kedah
19	MF	Ji Fedalliah Claritta Jaimin	28 August 1996 (aged 21)	(Football Association of Malaysia) Sabah
22	MF	Haindee Mosroh	17 April 1993 (aged 25)	(Football Association of Malaysia) Sabah
25	MF	Norhanisa Yahya	2 April 1989 (aged 29)	(Football Association of Malaysia) PDRM
11	FW	Puteri Noralisa Wilkinson	10 November 1995 (aged 22)	(Football Association of Malaysia) Pahang
18	FW	Sihaya Ajad	10 March 1990 (aged 28)	(Football Association of Malaysia) Sabah

=== Thailand ===
Head coach: Nuengrutai Srathongvian

No.	Pos.	Player	Date of birth (age)	Club
1	GK	Waraporn Boonsing	16 February 1990 (aged 28)	(Football Association of Thailand) BG Bundit Asia
18	GK	Sukanya Chor Charoenying	24 November 1987 (aged 30)	(Football Association of Thailand) Chonburi
22	GK	Nattaruja Muthtanawech	21 August 1996 (aged 21)	(Football Association of Thailand) Khonkaen
2	DF	Kanjanaporn Saenkhun	18 July 1996 (aged 21)	(Football Association of Thailand) Khonkaen
3	DF	Natthakarn Chinwong	15 March 1992 (aged 26)	(Football Association of Thailand) BG–College of Asian Scholars
4	DF	Duangnapa Sritala (c)	4 February 1986 (aged 32)	(Football Association of Thailand) Bangkok
5	DF	Ainon Phancha	27 January 1992 (aged 26)	(Football Association of Thailand) Chonburi
9	DF	Warunee Phetwiset	13 December 1990 (aged 27)	(Football Association of Thailand) Chonburi
10	DF	Sunisa Srangthaisong	6 May 1988 (aged 30)	(Football Association of Thailand) Dhurakij Pundit
16	DF	Khwanrudi Saengchan	16 May 1991 (aged 27)	(Football Association of Thailand) BG Bundit Asia
19	DF	Pitsamai Sornsai	19 January 1989 (aged 29)	(Football Association of Thailand) Chonburi
24	DF	Darut Changplook	3 February 1988 (aged 30)	(Football Association of Thailand) Bangkok
6	MF	Pikul Khueanpet	20 September 1988 (aged 29)	(Football Association of Thailand) BG Bundit Asia
7	MF	Silawan Intamee	22 January 1994 (aged 24)	(Football Association of Thailand) Chonburi
11	FW	Alisa Rukpinij	2 February 1995 (aged 23)	(Football Association of Thailand) Chonburi
12	MF	Rattikan Thongsombut	7 July 1991 (aged 26)	(Football Association of Thailand) BG Bundit Asia
13	MF	Orathai Srimanee	12 June 1988 (aged 30)	(Football Association of Thailand) BG Bundit Asia
15	MF	Nipawan Panyosuk	14 March 1995 (aged 23)	(Football Association of Thailand) Chonburi
20	MF	Wilaiporn Boothduang	25 June 1987 (aged 31)	
25	MF	Sudarat Chuchuen	19 June 1997 (aged 21)	
8	FW	Suchawadee Nildhamrong	1 April 1997 (aged 21)	(United States Soccer Federation) California Golden Bears
17	FW	Taneekarn Dangda	15 December 1992 (aged 25)	(Football Association of Thailand) Chonburi
21	FW	Kanjana Sungngoen	21 September 1986 (aged 31)	(Football Association of Thailand) Chonburi

=== Timor-Leste ===
Head coach: (South Korea) Lee Min-young

No.	Pos.	Player	Date of birth (age)	Caps	Goals	Club
1	GK	Agostinha	28 August 1995 (aged 22)	2	0	
12	GK	Helena	26 August 1993 (aged 24)	4	0	
2	DF	Eurosia	19 December 1993 (aged 24)	3	0	
3	DF	Trifonia	2 October 1996 (aged 21)	2	0	
4	DF	Agueda	19 August 1996 (aged 21)	4	0	
5	DF	Maria	1 February 1997 (aged 21)	3	0	(East Timor Football Federation) Sport Laulara e Benfica
15	DF	Nilda	3 April 1999 (aged 19)	2	0	
7	MF	Natacha	23 December 1998 (aged 19)	1	0	(East Timor Football Federation) Escola Portuguesa Ruy Cinatti
8	MF	Godelivia	12 September 1998 (aged 19)	3	0	(East Timor Football Federation) Sport Laulara e Benfica
9	MF	Vanessa	2 November 1998 (aged 19)	2	0	
14	MF	N. Jaquelina		0	0	
18	MF	Luselia	6 May 1993 (aged 25)	4	0	
19	MF	Femania	8 May 1996 (aged 22)	3	0	(East Timor Football Federation) Sport Laulara e Benfica
21	MF	Soka	10 August 1994 (aged 23)	0	0	
22	MF	Da Silva		2	0	
23	MF	Rosa (Captain)	2 September 1993 (aged 24)	2	0	
6	FW	Fernanda	1 November 1990 (aged 27)	0	0	
10	FW	Ervina	2 January 1996 (aged 22)	2	0	
11	FW	Julia	8 October 1997 (aged 20)	3	0	
13	FW	Natalia	23 December 1992 (aged 25)	2	0	
16	FW	Veronica		1	0	
17	FW	Sonia	2 May 1997 (aged 21)	3	0	(East Timor Football Federation) Escola Portuguesa Ruy Cinatti

== Group B ==
=== Indonesia ===
Head coach: Satia Bagdja Ijatna.

No.	Pos.	Player	Date of birth (age)	Club
30	GK	Norffince Boma	26 April 1995 (aged 23)	(Football Association of Indonesia) Galanita Papua
1	GK	Vera Lestari	17 January 1995 (aged 23)	(Football Association of Indonesia) NPS FC Surabaya (Women's Pro League Ina)
33	GK	Riska Yulianti	10 July 1998 (aged 19)	(Football Association of Indonesia) Galanita Babel
6	DF	Ade Mustikiana Oktaviani	3 October 1999 (aged 18)	(Football Association of Indonesia) Galanita Babel
5	DF	Rizky Amalia Putri		(Football Association of Indonesia) NPS FC Surabaya(Women's Pro League Ina)
2	DF	Safira Ika Putri Kartini	21 April 2003 (aged 15)	(Football Association of Indonesia) Galanita Babel
3	DF	Vivi Oktavia Riski		(Football Association of Indonesia) Galanita Babel
12	DF	Risda Yulianti		(Football Association of Indonesia) UPI Bandung(Women's Pro League Indonesia)
17	DF	Nur Laili Khomariyah Purnama	7 June 1996 (aged 22)	(Football Association of Indonesia) NPS FC Surabaya(Women's Pro League Ina)
10	MF	Zahra Musdalifah (Captain)	4 April 2001 (aged 17)	(Football Association of Indonesia) Galanita Banten
7	MF	Yudith Herlina Sada		(Football Association of Indonesia) Galanita Papua
23	MF	Rani Mulyasari	4 March 1993 (aged 25)	(Football Association of Indonesia) UPI Bandung (Women's Pro League Indonesia)
20	MF	Dhanielle Daphne	20 April 2000 (aged 18)	(Football Association of Indonesia) Galanita Jabar
16	MF	Dwie Aprillia Fitria Murti		(Football Association of Indonesia) Pansa FC Bantul(Women's Pro League Ina)
28	MF	Susi Susanti	22 August 1990 (aged 27)	(Football Association of Indonesia) Jaya Kencana Angels(Women's Pro League Ina)
29	MF	Jesella Arifya Sari		(Football Association of Indonesia) Banteng Muda Malang (Women's Pro Lg Ina)
31	MF	Ria Ristiani		(Football Association of Indonesia) Galanita Jabar
25	MF	Tia Darti Septiawati		(Football Association of Indonesia) Banteng Muda Malang (Women's Pro Lg Ina)
13	FW	Mayang ZP		(Football Association of Malaysia) Selangor FA
15	FW	Syenida Meryfandia	16 March 1996 (aged 22)	(Football Association of Indonesia) Jaya Kencana Angels (Women's Pro League Ina)
22	FW	Tugiyati Cindy	21 July 1985 (aged 32)	(Football Association of Indonesia) Banteng Muda Malang (Women's Pro Lg Ina)
27	MF	Dewi Tia Safitri		(Football Association of Indonesia) Pansa FC Bantul(Women's Pro League Ina)

=== Philippines ===
Head coach: Buda Bautista

No.	Pos.	Player	Date of birth (age)	Club
1	GK	Inna Palacios	February 8, 1994 (aged 24)	Unattached
6	GK	Nicole Reyes		(Philippine Football Federation) University of Santo Tomas
14	GK	Stacey Cavill	November 20, 1994 (aged 23)	(Football Australia) Beckenham Angels
5	DF	Hali Long	January 21, 1995 (aged 23)	Unattached
11	DF	Alesa Dolino	October 26, 1992 (aged 25)	(Philippine Football Federation) OutKast
13	DF	Patricia Tomanon	April 10, 1994 (aged 24)	Unattached
24	DF	Patrice Impelido (captain)	October 9, 1987 (aged 30)	(Philippine Football Federation) Hiraya
33	DF	Sofia Harrison	February 16, 1999 (aged 19)	(United States Soccer Federation) Slippery Rock University
7	MF	Camille Rodriguez	December 27, 1994 (aged 23)	(Philippine Football Federation) Hiraya
8	MF	Joyce Semacio	January 29, 2000 (aged 18)	(Philippine Football Federation) Philippine College of Technology
9	MF	Irish Navaja	May 12, 1997 (aged 21)	(Philippine Football Federation) De La Salle University
16	MF	Charisa Lemoran	September 21, 1998 (aged 19)	(Philippine Football Federation) University of Santo Tomas
17	MF	Kyla Inquig	January 24, 1997 (aged 21)	Unattached
26	MF	Hanna Parado	January 30, 1996 (aged 22)	(United States Soccer Federation) North Florida Ospreys
29	MF	Anicka Castañeda	December 15, 1999 (aged 18)	(Philippine Football Federation) Green Archers United
12	FW	Quinley Quezada	April 7, 1997 (aged 21)	(United States Soccer Federation) UC Riverside Highlanders
19	FW	Eva Madarang	September 13, 1997 (aged 20)	(United States Soccer Federation) Rogers State Hillcats
20	FW	Alisha del Campo	September 20, 1999 (aged 18)	(Philippine Football Federation) Green Archers United

=== Singapore ===
Head coach: K. Balagumaran

The squad was announced on 28 June 2018.

No.	Pos.	Player	Date of birth (age)	Club
1	GK	Noor Kusumawati Mohammad Rosman	29 September 1990 (aged 27)	(Football Association of Singapore) Warriors FC
23	GK	Pamela Kong Zi En	5 August 1991 (aged 26)	(Football Association of Singapore) Arion FA
30	GK	Nur Shahira Sulaiman	16 June 1998 (aged 20)	(Football Association of Singapore) Warriors FC
3	DF	Angelyn Pang Yen Ping	13 April 1991 (aged 27)	(Football Association of Singapore) Woodlands Wellington
5	DF	Nur Syazwani Mohamad Ruzi	20 December 2001 (aged 16)	(Football Association of Singapore) Warriors FC
6	DF	Nur Umairah Mohd Hamdan	11 March 2002 (aged 16)	(Football Association of Singapore) Tampines Changkat CSC
11	DF	Fatin Aqillah Mohamed Ridzuan	11 June 1994 (aged 24)	(Football Association of Singapore) Tanjong Pagar United
14	DF	Suria Priya Varatharaja	27 May 1991 (aged 27)	(Football Association of Singapore) Tanjong Pagar United
16	DF	Nur Shaahidah Zulkifli	31 May 1999 (aged 19)	(Football Association of Singapore) Tampines Changkat CSC
27	DF	Nur Izyani Noorghani (Captain)	2 October 1987 (aged 30)	(Football Association of Singapore) Warriors FC
2	MF	Nur Emilia Natasha Khairul Anuar	15 January 1999 (aged 19)	(Football Association of Singapore) Police SA
7	MF	Lim Li Xian	24 November 1996 (aged 21)	(Football Association of Singapore) Warriors FC
9	MF	Nur Afiqah Omar	15 October 2001 (aged 16)	(Football Association of Singapore) Tampines Changkat CSC
10	MF	Priscilla Tan Hui Yee	27 December 1993 (aged 24)	(Football Australia) Eastern Suburbs
12	MF	Ho Hui Xin	23 April 1992 (aged 26)	(Football Association of Singapore) Woodlands Wellington
13	MF	Ernie Sulastri Sontaril	24 November 1988 (aged 29)	(Football Association of Singapore) Tampines Changkat CSC
18	MF	Joey Cheng Yu Ying	6 November 1993 (aged 24)	(Football Association of Singapore) Warriors FC
19	MF	Rochelle Chan Wan Wen	21 August 1995 (aged 22)	(Football Association of Singapore) Woodlands Wellington
21	MF	Nur Izzati Rosni	24 May 1999 (aged 19)	(Football Association of Singapore) Arion FA
22	MF	Nur Farhanah Ruhaizat	26 July 1998 (aged 19)	(Football Association of Singapore) Tanjong Pagar United
4	FW	Stephanie Gigette A Dominguez	27 September 1998 (aged 19)	(Football Association of Singapore) Warriors FC
8	MF	Sitianiwati Roselin	26 May 1997 (aged 21)	(Football Association of Singapore) Warriors FC

=== Vietnam ===
Head coach: Mai Đức Chung

No.	Pos.	Player	Date of birth (age)	Club
1	GK	Đoàn Thị Ngọc Phương		
14	GK	Trần Thị Kim Thanh	18 September 1993 (aged 24)	(Vietnam Football Federation) Hồ Chí Minh City
22	GK	Khổng Thị Hằng	10 October 1993 (aged 24)	(Vietnam Football Federation) Than Khoáng Sản
2	DF	Trần Thị Hồng Nhung	28 October 1992 (aged 25)	(Vietnam Football Federation) Phong Phú Hà Nam W.F.C.
3	DF	Chương Thị Kiều	19 August 1995 (aged 22)	(Vietnam Football Federation) Hồ Chí Minh City
4	DF	Nguyễn Thanh Huyền	12 August 1996 (aged 21)	(Vietnam Football Federation) Hà Nội
5	DF	Bùi Thị Thúy	17 July 1998 (aged 19)	(Vietnam Football Federation) Than Khoáng Sản Việt Nam
6	DF	Bùi Thúy An	5 October 1990 (aged 27)	(Vietnam Football Federation) Hà Nội
10	DF	Hoàng Thị Loan	6 February 1995 (aged 23)	
13	DF	Nguyễn Thị Mỹ Anh		
15	DF	Phạm Thị Tươi	26 June 1993 (aged 25)	(Vietnam Football Federation) Hà Nam
16	DF	Nguyễn Thị Ngọc Lê		(Vietnam Football Federation) Than Khoáng Sản Việt Nam
7	MF	Nguyễn Thị Tuyết Dung	13 December 1993 (aged 24)	(Vietnam Football Federation) Hà Nam
8	MF	Nguyễn Thị Liễu	18 September 1992 (aged 25)	(Vietnam Football Federation) Hà Nam
11	MF	Thái Thị Thảo	12 February 1995 (aged 23)	
17	MF	Đinh Thị Thùy Dung	25 August 1998 (aged 19)	
18	MF	Nguyễn Thị Vạn	10 January 1997 (aged 21)	(Vietnam Football Federation) Than Khoáng Sản
20	MF	Hà Thị Nhài		
23	MF	Phạm Hoàng Quỳnh	20 September 1992 (aged 25)	(Vietnam Football Federation) Than Khoáng Sản
9	FW	Huỳnh Như	28 November 1991 (aged 26)	
12	FW	Phạm Hải Yến	9 November 1994 (aged 23)	(Vietnam Football Federation) Hà Nội
19	FW	Nguyễn Thị Huệ		
21	FW	Nguyễn Thị Thúy Hằng	19 November 1997 (aged 20)	(Vietnam Football Federation) Than Khoáng Sản
