= 2023 in Philippine football =

Football in Philippines
- Season: 2023

Men's football
- Philippines Football League: Kaya–Iloilo
- Copa Paulino Alcantara: Kaya–Iloilo

Women's football
- PFF Women's League: Kaya–Iloilo

The following article is a summary of the 2023 football season in the Philippines.

== National teams ==
=== Men's senior ===
==== AFF Championship ====
January 2 Group Stage	Philippines	1–2	Indonesia	Manila, Philippines
20:30 UTC+8	Rasmussen 83'	Report (AFFMEC)	Dendy 21'; Marselino 43'	Stadium: Rizal Memorial Stadium; Referee: Ahmed Faisal Al Ali (Jordan)

==== Friendlies ====
March 24	Kuwait	2–0	Philippines	Kuwait City, Kuwait
22:00 UTC+3	Al-Fadhel 71'; Khalaf 84'	Report		Stadium: Jaber Al-Ahmad International Stadium; Referee: Shukri Hussein Al Hunfush (Saudi Arabia)

March 28	Jordan	4–0	Philippines	Doha, Qatar
21:30 UTC+3	Tamari 10' (pen.), 26'; Naimat 56'; Olwan 58'

June 15	Philippines	1–0	Nepal	Manila, Philippines
19:00 UTC+8	Gayoso 49'			Stadium: Rizal Memorial Stadium; Attendance: 3,200

June 19	Philippines	2–3	Chinese Taipei	Manila, Philippines
19:00 UTC+8	Mi. Ott 12' (pen.); Reichelt 39'		Wu Yen-shu 2'; Yu Yao-hsing 57'; Lin Ming-wei 90'	Stadium: Rizal Memorial Stadium; Attendance: 3,758; Referee: Lê Vũ Linh (Vietnam)

September 8	Chinese Taipei	1–1	Philippines	Kaohsiung, Taiwan
19:00 UTC+8	Shao-Yu Pai 90+4'		Reichelt 18'	Stadium: Kaohsiung National Stadium; Referee: Lê Vũ Linh (Vietnam)

September 12	Philippines	2–1	Afghanistan	Manila, Philippines
19:00 UTC+8	Rasmussen 74'; Rontini 81'		Popalzay 64'	Stadium: Rizal Memorial Stadium; Attendance: 2,137

October 17	Bahrain	1–0	Philippines	Arad, Bahrain
19:00 UTC+3	Al-Khatal 16'			Stadium: Al Muharraq Stadium

==== FIFA World Cup qualification ====
November 16 Second round	Philippines	0–2	Vietnam	Manila, Philippines
19:00 UTC+8		Report	Nguyễn Văn Toàn 16' Nguyễn Đình Bắc 90+4'	Stadium: Rizal Memorial Stadium; Attendance: 10,378; Referee: Rustam Lutfullin (Uzbekistan)

November 21 Second round	Philippines	1–1	Indonesia	Manila, Philippines
19:00 UTC+8	Reichelt 23'	Report	Saddil 70'	Stadium: Rizal Memorial Stadium; Attendance: 9,880; Referee: Kim Jong-hyeok (South Korea)

=== Men's under-23 ===
==== Southeast Asian Games ====
April 29 GS	Indonesia	3–0	Philippines	Phnom Penh
16:00	Marselino 45'; Irfan 89'; Fajar 90+1'	Report		Stadium: Olympic Stadium; Attendance: 14,500; Referee: Rowan Arumughan (India)

May 2 GS	Philippines	1–1	Cambodia	Phnom Penh
19:00	Cariño 90+3'	Report	Rina 26'	Stadium: Olympic Stadium; Attendance: 30,118; Referee: Nazmi Nasaruddin (Malaysia)

May 4 GS	Timor-Leste	3–0	Philippines	Phnom Penh
19:00	Mouzinho 14'; Figo 55'; Mesquita 90'	Report		Stadium: Olympic Stadium; Attendance: 3,182; Referee: Qasim Al-Hatmi (Oman)

May 10 GS	Philippines	0–1	Myanmar	Phnom Penh
19:00		Report	Thet Hein Soe 55'	Stadium: RSN Stadium; Attendance: 432; Referee: Rowan Arumughan (India)

==== AFF U-23 Championship ====
August 18 GS	Philippines	2–2	Laos	Rayong, Thailand
16:00 UTC+7	Mamon 23'; Chung 90+2'	Report	Khamsa 39'; Souphan 90+5'	Stadium: Rayong Province Stadium; Attendance: 77; Referee: Songkran Bunmeekiart (Thailand)

August 22 GS	Vietnam	1–0	Philippines	Rayong, Thailand
20:00 UTC+7	Nguyễn Hữu Tuấn 18'	Report		Stadium: Rayong Province Stadium; Attendance: 607; Referee: Hiroki Kasahara (Japan)

==== AFC U-23 Asian Cup qualification ====
September 6 Group H	Thailand	5-0	Philippines	Chonburi, Thailand
20:30 UTC+7				Stadium: Chonburi Stadium

September 9 Group H	Philippines	0-4	Malaysia	Chonburi, Thailand
20:30 UTC+7				Stadium: Chonburi Stadium

September 12 Group H	Bangladesh	0-1	Philippines	Chonburi, Thailand
16:30 UTC+7				Stadium: Chonburi Stadium

=== Women's senior ===
==== FIFA Women's World Cup ====
The Philippines made its debut in the FIFA Women's World Cup, marking the first time a Philippine national football team of any gender or age level participated in the tournament. The team played its first match against Switzerland and later earned its first World Cup victory in a 1−0 win against co-host New Zealand. Sarina Bolden scored the winning goal in the 24th minute, marking the Philippines first goal in World Cup history.

===== Group A =====
Pos	Team	Pld	W	D	L	GF	GA	GD	Pts	Qualification
1	Switzerland	3	1	2	0	2	0	+2	5	Advance to knockout stage
2	Norway	3	1	1	1	6	1	+5	4	Advance to knockout stage
3	New Zealand (H)	3	1	1	1	1	1	0	4	
4	Philippines	3	1	0	2	1	8	−7	3	

Source: FIFA
(H) Hosts

July 21 GS	Philippines	0–2	Switzerland	Dunedin, New Zealand
17:00 UTC+12		Report	Bachmann 45' (pen.); Piubel 64'	Stadium: Forsyth Barr Stadium; Attendance: 13,711; Referee: Vincentia Amedome (Togo)

July 25 GS	New Zealand	0–1	Philippines	Wellington, New Zealand
17:30 UTC+12		Report	Bolden 24'	Stadium: Wellington Regional Stadium; Referee: Katia García (Mexico)

July 30 GS	Norway	6–0	Philippines	Auckland, New Zealand
19:00 UTC+12	Román Haug 6', 17', 90+5'; Graham Hansen 31'; Barker 48' (o.g.); Reiten 53' (pen.)			Stadium: Eden Park; Attendance: 34,697; Referee: Marie-Soleil Beaudoin (Canada)

==== Friendlies ====
February 15 Pinatar Cup	Wales	1–0	Philippines	San Pedro del Pinatar, Spain
20:30 UTC+1	Green 45' (pen.)	Report		Stadium: Pinatar Arena; Referee: Lucie Šulcová (Czech Republic)

February 18 Pinatar Cup	Philippines	1–2	Scotland	San Pedro del Pinatar, Spain
15:00 UTC+1	Serrano 90'	Report	Davidson 39'; Corsie 57'	Stadium: Pinatar Arena; Referee: Zuzana Valentová (Slovakia)

February 21 Pinatar Cup	Iceland	5–0	Philippines	San Pedro del Pinatar, Spain
20:30 UTC+1	Andradóttir 20', 51'; Magnúsdóttir 71'; Eiríksdóttir 80'; Jóhannsdóttir 90+3'	Report		Stadium: Pinatar Arena; Referee: Zuzana Valentová (Slovakia)

==== AFC Women's Olympic Qualifying Tournament ====
April 5 Round 1	Philippines	4–0	Pakistan	Hisor, Tajikistan
16:00 UTC+5	Long 21'; Bolden 25'; Madarang 29'; C. McDaniel 85'	Report		Stadium: Hisor Central Stadium; Attendance: 100; Referee: Dong Fangyu (China)

April 8 Round 1	Tajikistan	0–8	Philippines	Hisor, Tajikistan
19:00 UTC+5		Report	Harrison 26'; Annis 28'; Frilles 31'; Quezada 35'; Serrano 38'; Alcantara 45+3'; McDaniel 59', 88'	Stadium: Hisor Central Stadium

April 11 Round 1	Philippines	4–0	Hong Kong	Hisor, Tajikistan
19:00 UTC+5	Bolden 5', 41'; Serrano 44'; Quezada 53'			Stadium: Hisor Central Stadium

October 26 Round 2	Chinese Taipei	1–4	Philippines	Perth, Australia
16:00 UTC+8	Hsu Yi-yun 47'	Report	Bolden 54' (pen.), 83'; Guillou 61'; C. McDaniel 90'	Stadium: Perth Rectangular Stadium; Attendance: 2,725; Referee: Asaka Koizumi (Japan)

October 29 Round 2	Philippines	0–8	Australia	Perth, Australia
15:10 UTC+8		Report	Fowler 15'; Kerr 19', 45+2', 46'; Foord 30', 34', 56'; Wheeler 72'	Stadium: Perth Stadium; Attendance: 59,155; Referee: Ranjita Devi Tekcham (India)

November 1 Round 2	Philippines	1–0	Iran	Perth, Australia
15:50 UTC+8	Annis 19'	Report		Stadium: Perth Rectangular Stadium; Attendance: 3,111; Referee: Yu Hong (China)

==== Southeast Asian Games ====
May 3 GS	Philippines	0–1	Myanmar	Phnom Penh
			Win Theingi Tun 89' (pen.)	Stadium: RCAF Stadium

May 6 GS	Malaysia	0–1	Philippines	Phnom Penh
			Bolden 90+6'	Stadium: RCAF Stadium

May 9 GS	Vietnam	1–2	Philippines	Phnom Penh
	Nguyễn Thị Bích Thùy 40'		Bolden 12' (pen.); Long 82'	Stadium: RSN Stadium

==== Asian Games ====
===== Group E =====
Pos	Team	Pld	W	D	L	GF	GA	GD	Pts	Qualification
1	South Korea	3	3	0	0	13	1	+12	9	Knockout stage
2	Philippines	3	2	0	1	7	6	+1	6	Knockout stage
3	Myanmar	3	1	0	2	1	6	−5	3	
4	Hong Kong	3	0	0	3	1	9	−8	0	

Source: Football – Women – Groups
Rules for classification: Group stage tiebreakers

===== Knockout stage =====
Quarter-finals
30 September 2023 – Linping
China	4
Thailand	0
30 September 2023 – Wenzhou Olympic
Japan	8
Philippines	1
30 September 2023 – Linping
Chinese Taipei	1
Uzbekistan (a.e.t.)	2
30 September 2023 – Wenzhou
South Korea	1
North Korea	4

Semi-finals
3 October 2023 – Linping
China	3
Japan	4
3 October 2023 – Shangcheng
Uzbekistan	0
North Korea	8

Gold medal match
6 October 2023 – Huanglong
Japan	4
North Korea	1
Bronze medal match
6 October 2023 – Huanglong
China	7
Uzbekistan	0

September 22 GS	Hong Kong	1–3	Philippines	Wenzhou, China
16:00 UTC+8	Cheung Wai Ki 38'	Report	Bolden 8' (pen.); Quezada 89'; Guillou 90+1'	Stadium: Wenzhou Sports Centre; Attendance: 2,522; Referee: Lara Christie Lee (Australia)

September 25 GS	Philippines	1–5	South Korea	Wenzhou, China
19:30 UTC+8	Bolden 8'	Report	Chun Ga-ram 12'; Son Hwa-yeon 44', 56', 70'; Ji So-yun 52' (pen.)	Stadium: Wenzhou Sports Centre; Attendance: 2,974; Referee: Asaka Koizumi (Japan)

September 28 GS	Philippines	3–0	Myanmar	Wenzhou, China
19:30 UTC+8	Bolden 19' (pen.); Eggesvik 60', 61'	Report		Stadium: Wenzhou Sports Centre; Attendance: 4,436; Referee: Asaka Koizumi (Japan)

September 30 QF	Japan	8–1	Philippines	Wenzhou, China
19:30 UTC+8	Tanikawa 40' (pen.); Osawa 58', 90+4'; Chiba 65'; Ueno 76' (pen.), 78', 81', 90+1'	Report	Bolden 68'	Stadium: Wenzhou Olympic Sports Centre Stadium; Attendance: 33,607; Referee: Casey Reibelt (Australia)

=== Women's under-20 ===
==== AFC U-20 Women's Asian Cup qualification ====
===== Group A =====
- All matches were held in Laos.
- Times listed are UTC+7.

Pos	Team	Pld	W	D	L	GF	GA	GD	Pts	Qualification
1	China	3	3	0	0	20	0	+20	9	Second round
2	Philippines	3	1	1	1	3	8	−5	4	
3	Hong Kong	3	0	2	1	4	10	−6	2	
4	Laos (H)	3	0	1	2	2	11	−9	1	

Source: AFC
Rules for classification: Qualification tiebreakers
(H) Hosts

March 8 First round	China	6–0	Philippines	Vientiane, Laos
16:00 UTC+7	Huo Yuexin 9', 36'; Zou Mengyao 22'; Lu Jiayu 69'; Ouyang Yuhuan 74'; Qiao Ruiqi 82'	Report		Stadium: National Stadium KM16; Attendance: 453; Referee: Choki Om (Bhutan)

March 10 First round	Philippines	1–0	Laos	Vientiane, Laos
19:30 UTC+7	Yap 42'	Report		Stadium: National Stadium KM16; Attendance: 415; Referee: Mahsa Ghorbani (Iran)

March 12 First round	Hong Kong	2–2	Philippines	Vientiane, Laos
16:00 UTC+7	Lee 24'; Anke Leung 45+1'	Report	Dizon 11'; Pasion 54'	Stadium: National Stadium KM16; Attendance: 252; Referee: Azusa Sugino (Japan)

==== AFF U-19 Women's Championship ====
July 6 GS	Philippines	0–6	Thailand	Palembang, Indonesia
19:30		Report	Kantisa 17'; Natcha 19'; Jeena 75' (pen.); Anaphon 82'; Thanchanok 83'; Rinyaphat 84' (pen.)	Stadium: Jakabaring Athletic Field

July 8 GS	Myanmar	2–1	Philippines	Palembang, Indonesia
19:30	Zin Moe Pyae 58'; Yin Loon Eain 75'	Report	Alforque 40'	Stadium: Jakabaring Athletic Field

=== Women's under-17 ===
==== Friendlies ====
March 18 JENESYS U-17 Women's Football Memorial Cup	Japan	12–0	Philippines	Uruma City, Japan
13:00 UTC+9		Report		Stadium: Uruma Gushikawa Multipurpose Sports Ground

March 19 JENESYS U-17 Women's Football Memorial Cup	Myanmar	3–1	Philippines	Uruma City, Japan
13:00 UTC+9		Report		Stadium: Uruma Gushikawa Multipurpose Sports Ground

March 20 JENESYS U-17 Women's Football Memorial Cup	Philippines	9–0	Timor-Leste	Uruma City, Japan
9:00 UTC+9		Report		Stadium: Uruma Gushikawa Multipurpose Sports Ground

March 21 JENESYS U-17 Women's Football Memorial Cup Classification	Indonesia	3–5	Philippines	Uruma City, Japan
9:00 UTC+9		Report		Stadium: Uruma Gushikawa Multipurpose Sports Ground

==== AFC U-17 Women's Asian Cup qualification ====
The Filipinas U17 qualified for the AFC U-17 Women's Asian Cup for the first time, scheduled to be held in Indonesia in April 2024. The team's qualification was secured with a 1–0 win against Vietnam. Isabella Preston scored the winning goal from a free-kick in the 56th minute to create history for the Philippines.

April 22 Round 1	Guam	1–3	Philippines	GFA National Training Center, Dededo
19:00	Kukahiko 71'	Report	Mathelus 29', 47', 76'	Referee: Haruna Kanematsu (Japan)

April 26 Round 1	Philippines	2–0	Lebanon	GFA National Training Center, Dededo
19:00	Alamo 68'; Mathelus 90' (pen.)	Report		Referee: Lara Lee (Australia)

September 20 Round 2	Australia	6–2	Philippines	Vietnam Youth Football Training Center, Hanoi
16:00	Kuilamu 30'; Cuthbert 42'; McMahon 46'; Skelly 55'; Younis 75'; Duong 86' (pen.)	Report	Mathelus 14' (pen.), 17'	Referee: Mahsa Ghorbani (Iran)

September 22 Round 2	Philippines	3–1	Bangladesh	Vietnam Youth Football Training Center, Hanoi
16:00	Preston 3'; Mathelus 32'; Soon 90+5'	Report	Sagorika 4'

September 24 Round 2	Vietnam	0–1	Philippines	Vietnam Youth Football Training Center, Hanoi
19:00			Preston 56'

=== Women's futsal ===
==== Friendlies ====
October 19 PFF Women's Tri Nation	Philippines	4–9	Indonesia	Manila, Philippines
18:00	Bicierro 12', 38'; Bandoja 16'; Ortillo 31'	Report	Kartika 6', 13'; Lala 7'; Ananda 8', 17'; Rosdiana 11', 34'; Rosita 27'; Hilda 35'	Stadium: Ninoy Aquino Stadium

October 20 PFF Women's Tri Nation	New Zealand	4–1	Philippines	Manila, Philippines
18:00	Manak 8'; Nicholson 15'; Kraakman 23'; Gillion 28'	Report	Ortillo 2'	Stadium: Ninoy Aquino Stadium

October 21 PFF Women's Tri Nation	New Zealand	0–1 (a.e.t.)	Philippines	Manila, Philippines
16:00		Report	Rebosura	Stadium: Ninoy Aquino Stadium

October 22 PFF Women's Tri Nation	Indonesia	5–2	Philippines	Manila, Philippines
16:00	Hendrita 1'; Murni 9'; Saksabillah 25'; Rosdiana 34', 40'	Report	Bandoja 14'; Danton 29'	Stadium: Ninoy Aquino Stadium

== AFC competitions ==
=== AFC Champions League ===
==== Group G ====
Pos	Team	Pld	W	D	L	GF	GA	GD	Pts	Qualification	FMA	SHT	ICN	KAY
1	(Japan) Yokohama F. Marinos	6	4	0	2	12	7	+5	12 (Note: Head-to-head goal difference: Yokohama F. Marinos +1, Shandong Taishan 0, Incheon United −1.)	Advance to round of 16	—	3–0	2–4	3–0
2	(China) Shandong Taishan	6	4	0	2	14	7	+7	12	Advance to round of 16	0–1	—	3–1	6–1
3	(South Korea) Incheon United	6	4	0	2	14	9	+5	12		2–1	0–2	—	4–0
4	(Philippines) Kaya–Iloilo	6	0	0	6	4	21	−17	0		1–2	1–3	1–3	—

Source: AFC
Rules for classification: Tiebreakers

=== AFC Cup ===
==== Group F ====
Pos	Team	Pld	W	D	L	GF	GA	GD	Pts	Qualification	MAC	CRO	DHC	SHN
1	(Australia) Macarthur FC	6	5	0	1	23	5	+18	15	Zonal semi-finals	—	5–0	8–2	4–0
2	(Cambodia) Phnom Penh Crown	6	4	0	2	15	7	+8	12	Zonal semi-finals	3–0	—	4–0	4–0
3	(Philippines) DH Cebu	6	1	1	4	4	19	−15	4 (Note: Ranked on head-to-head points: DH Cebu 4, Shan United 1.)		0–3	0–3	—	1–0
4	(Myanmar) Shan United	6	1	1	4	3	14	−11	4		0–3	2–1	1–1	—

Source: AFC

==== Group G ====
Pos	Team	Pld	W	D	L	GF	GA	GD	Pts	Qualification	CCM	TFC	BUF	STA
1	(Australia) Central Coast Mariners	6	4	1	1	21	7	+14	13	Zonal semi-finals	—	1–1	6–3	9–1
2	(Malaysia) Terengganu	6	3	3	0	10	6	+4	12		1–0	—	2–0	2–2
3	(Indonesia) Bali United	6	2	1	3	15	15	0	7		1–2	1–1	—	5–2
4	(Philippines) Stallion Laguna	6	0	1	5	9	27	−18	1		0–3	2–3	2–5	—

Source: AFC

== Leagues ==
=== Philippines Football League ===
Pos	Team	Pld	W	D	L	GF	GA	GD	Pts	Qualification or relegation
1	Kaya–Iloilo (C)	22	18	1	3	70	20	+50	55	Qualification for the 2023–24 AFC Champions League
2	Dynamic Herb Cebu	22	15	6	1	52	23	+29	51	Qualification for the 2023–24 AFC Cup
3	Stallion Laguna	22	11	2	9	39	26	+13	35	Qualification for the 2023–24 AFC Cup
—	United City	12	7	3	2	27	13	+14	24	Withdrew
—	Azkals Development Team (Note: The Azkals Development Team were a guest team for the PFL and ineligible to qualify for AFC club competitions.) (G)	22	6	3	13	26	39	−13	21	Withdrew
4	Mendiola 1991	22	5	0	17	19	66	−47	15	
5	Maharlika Manila	22	2	1	19	14	60	−46	7	

Source: PFL
Rules for classification: 1) Points; 2) Goal Difference; 3) Goals scored
(C) Champions; (G) Guests

=== PFF Women's League ===
Pos	Team	Pld	W	D	L	GF	GA	GD	Pts	Qualification or relegation
1	Kaya–Iloilo (C)	9	7	1	1	42	6	+36	22	Qualification for Knockout Tournament
2	Far Eastern University	9	7	1	1	39	5	+34	22	Qualification for Knockout Tournament
3	Manila Digger	9	7	1	1	28	7	+21	22	Qualification for Knockout Tournament
4	De La Salle University	9	6	1	2	31	12	+19	19	Qualification for Knockout Tournament
5	Tuloy	9	5	0	4	34	20	+14	15	
6	Manila Nomads	9	3	2	4	15	22	−7	11	
7	University of the Philippines	9	3	1	5	9	25	−16	10	
8	University of Santo Tomas	9	2	1	6	16	26	−10	7	
9	Azzurri	9	1	0	8	6	38	−32	3	
10	Stallion Laguna	9	0	0	9	3	62	−59	0	

Updated to match(es) played on September 16, 2023. Source: PFFWL
Rules for classification: 1) Points; 2) Goal Difference; 3) Goals scored
(C) Champions

==== Knockout stage ====
Semi-finals
1	Kaya	2
4	De La Salle University	1
2	Far Eastern University	0 (4)
3	Manila Digger	0 (5)

Final
1	Kaya	1
3	Manila Digger	0
Third place
4	De La Salle University	1
2	Far Eastern University	2

== Domestic cups ==
=== Copa Paulino Alcantara ===
==== Group A ====
Pos	Team	Pld	W	D	L	GF	GA	GD	Pts	Qualification	KAY	CFM	PAF	FEU	LOY	GAR
1	Kaya–Iloilo	5	5	0	0	40	2	+38	15	Quarter-finals	—	8–0	9–1	—	—	11–0
2	CF Manila	5	3	1	1	9	12	−3	10	Quarter-finals	—	—	3–1	—	—	3–2
3	Philippine Air Force	5	2	1	2	8	14	−6	7		—	—	—	2–2	3–0	—
4	Far Eastern University	5	1	3	1	10	10	0	6		1–5	1–1	—	—	—	4–0
5	Loyola	5	1	1	3	8	15	−7	4		0–7	0–2	—	2–2	—	—
6	Don Bosco Garelli	5	0	0	5	3	25	−22	0		—	—	0–1	—	1–6	—

==== Group B ====
Pos	Team	Pld	W	D	L	GF	GA	GD	Pts	Qualification	CEB	MAH	UPH	DRA	DIG
1	Dynamic Herb Cebu	4	4	0	0	16	3	+13	12	Quarter-finals	—	2–1	2–0	—	—
2	Maharlika Manila	4	2	1	1	5	3	+2	7	Quarter-finals	—	—	1–0	—	1–1
3	University of the Philippines	4	2	0	2	6	5	+1	6	Quarter-finals	—	—	—	2–1	4–1
4	Pilipinas Dragons	4	1	0	3	3	12	−9	3		1–8	0–2	—	—	—
5	Manila Digger	4	0	1	3	3	10	−7	1		1–4	—	—	0–1	—

==== Group C ====
Pos	Team	Pld	W	D	L	GF	GA	GD	Pts	Qualification	STA	DAV	MEN	TLY	PAR	ADU
1	Stallion Laguna	5	4	0	1	28	4	+24	12	Quarter-finals	—	—	0–1	9–1	6–1	—
2	Davao Aguilas	5	3	1	1	14	10	+4	10	Quarter-finals	0–4	—	3–3	—	—	2–0
3	Mendiola 1991	5	2	3	0	10	8	+2	9	Quarter-finals	—	—	—	4–4	1–0	—
4	Tuloy	5	2	1	2	11	20	−9	7		—	0–5	—	—	3–2	—
5	Philippine Army	5	1	0	4	9	15	−6	3		—	3–4	—	—	—	3–1
6	Adamson University	5	0	1	4	3	18	−15	1		1–9	—	1–1	0–3	—	—

==== Knockout stage ====
Quarter-finals
Kaya–Iloilo	3	8	11
UP	0	0	0
Stallion Laguna	5	4	9
Maharlika Manila	0	0	0
Dynamic Herb Cebu	2	4	6
Mendiola 1991	0	1	1
CF Manila	0	0	0
Davao Aguilas	1	1	2

Semi-finals
Kaya–Iloilo	2	2	4
Stallion Laguna	1	1	2
Dynamic Herb Cebu	0	1	1
Davao Aguilas	1	1	2

Final
Kaya–Iloilo	1(4)
Davao Aguilas	1(3)

== See also ==
- Football in Philippines
