= Camille Rodriguez =

Filipino footballer (born 1994)

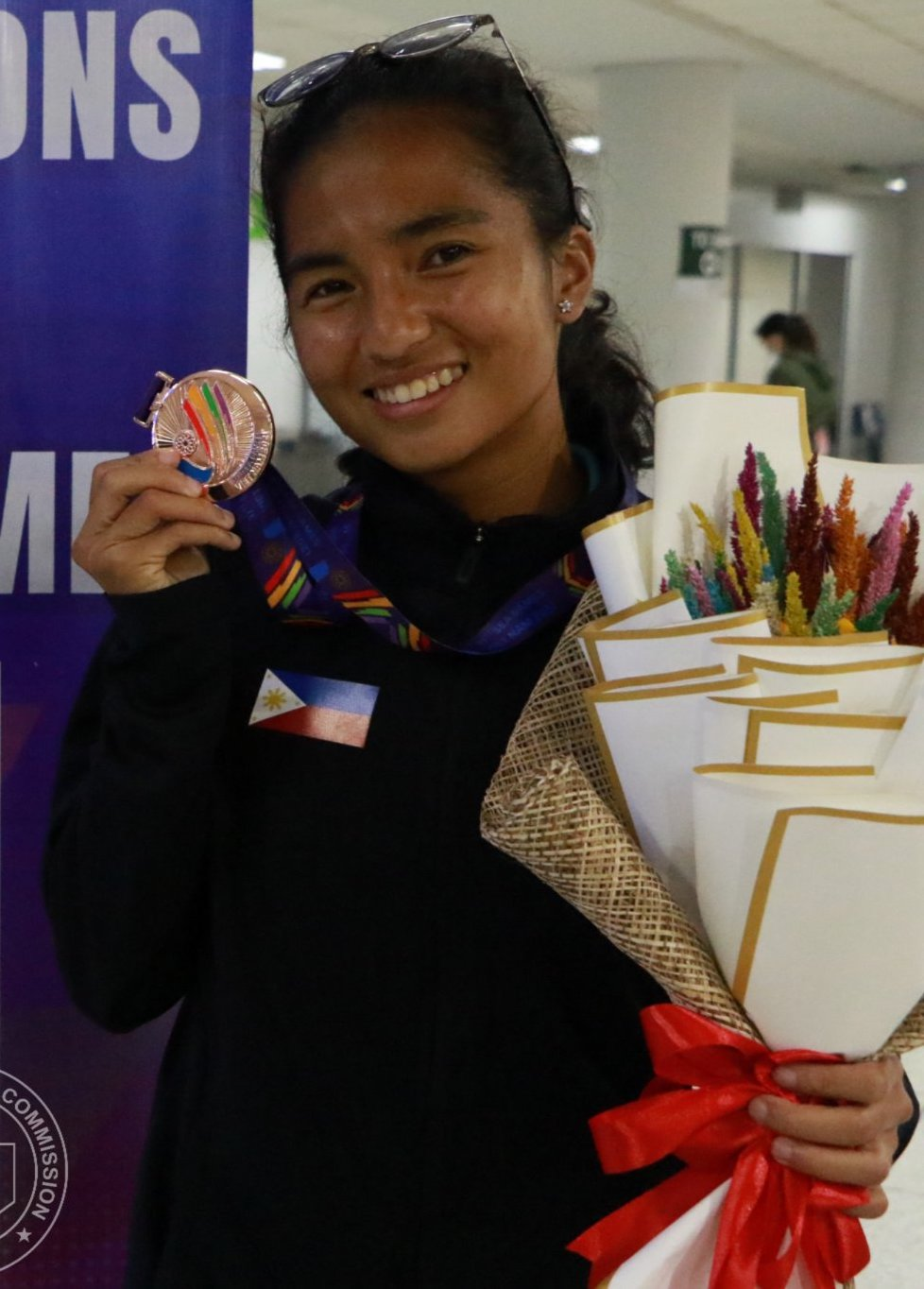
- Rodriguez with her bronze medal from the 2021 Southeast Asian Games

Personal information
- Full name: Kathleen Camille Muldong Rodriguez
- Date of birth: December 27, 1994 (age 31)
- Place of birth: Zamboanga City, Philippines
- Position: Midfielder

Team information
- Current team: Kaya-Iloilo
- Number: 7

Youth career
- –: Miriam College HS

College career
Years	Team	Apps	(Gls)
2012–2017	Ateneo de Manila University		

Senior career*
Years	Team	Apps	(Gls)
2018–2020	Hiraya		
~2022	Kaya-Iloilo		
2023–2023	Lords FA	6	(8)
2023–	Kaya-Iloilo		

International career
2011–	Philippines	42	(11)
Medal record
Women's football
Representing the Philippines
ASEAN Women's Championship
Winner	2022 Philippines	Team
Southeast Asian Games
Bronze medal – third place	2021 Vietnam	Team
- * Club domestic league appearances and goals

Kathleen Camille Muldong Rodriguez (born December 27, 1994) is a Filipina international footballer who plays as a midfielder for PFF Women's League club Kaya-Iloilo and the Philippines women's national team.

== Early life and education ==
Rodriguez was born in Zamboanga City on December 27, 1994. She studied at Miriam College High School for her secondary studies. Rodriguez attended the Ateneo de Manila University where she pursued a degree in psychology.

== Career ==
=== Early years ===
Rodriguez took up the sport of football in 2005. She participated in tournaments organized by the Rizal Football Association (RIFA) and played for Miriam at the Women's National Collegiate Athletic Association (WNCAA). She was named MVP in various RIFA-organized tournaments, mostly 9-a-sides, and was named to the Mythical Selection of the WNCAA from the 39th to the 41st season. She also played in the Palarong Pambansa in 2009 and 2010 for the National Capital Region. She was named MVP in both editions.

=== College ===
Rodriguez played for the Ateneo Lady Blue Booters, the women's football team of the Ateneo de Manila University during her college. She played for the Ateneo in the UAAP with her team finishing third thrice consecutively. She was named best striker in UAAP Season 77 and was part of the "Mythical Eleven" in UAAP Season 79. She was captain of the team by her senior year.

=== Club ===
Rodriguez has played for Ateneo when the collegiate team competed in the PFF Women's League. She played for her school in the domestic league's 2016–17 season. In the 2018 season, she joined Hiraya (Stallion–Hiraya in 2019–20).

The PFF Women's League would be suspended after the 2019–20 season, although Rodriguez would affiliate herself with the women's team of Kaya–Iloilo.

After her stint with Mislata FC in Spain, Rodriguez joined Kerala-based Lord's FA in April 2023 for their campaign in the 2022–23 Indian Women's League season.

==== International career ====
Rodriguez played in various youth national teams of the Philippines before earning her first international cap for the senior team in 2011 at age 16 at the 2011 AFF Women's Championship. She scored her first goal in the same tournament against Malaysia in 2011 but later took a break from international duty to focus on her collegiate studies.

Rodriguez returned to national team in 2017, and was part of the squad that competed at the 2017 Southeast Asian Games and the 2018 AFC Women's Asian Cup.

==== Other roles ====
Rodriguez became a mental performance coach for the Ateneo Blue Eagles women's football team starting the UAAP Season 86. Her role later expanded to cover Ateneo's men's volleyball team.

She has also been a game analyst for the Philippines Football League.

=== International goals ===
Scores and results list the Philippines' goal tally first.

#	Date	Venue	Opponent	Score	Result	Competition
1.	October 21, 2011	New Laos National Stadium, Vientiane, Laos	Malaysia	1–0	2–2	2012 AFF Women's Championship
2.	August 15, 2017	UiTM Stadium, Shah Alam, Malaysia	Malaysia	2–1	2–1	2017 Southeast Asian Games
3.	November 11, 2018	Hisor Central Stadium, Hisor, Tajikistan	Mongolia	3–1	5–1	2020 AFC Women's Olympic Qualifying Tournament
4.	August 3, 2019	PFF National Training Center, Carmona, Philippines	Macau	4–0	11–0	Friendly
5.	August 15, 2019	IPE Chonburi Stadium 1, Chonburi, Thailand	Malaysia	1–0	3–0	2019 AFF Women's Championship
6.	August 15, 2019	IPE Chonburi Stadium 1, Chonburi, Thailand	Malaysia	2–0	3–0	2019 AFF Women's Championship
7.	August 17, 2019	IPE Chonburi Stadium 1, Chonburi, Thailand	Timor-Leste	3–0	7–0	2019 AFF Women's Championship
8.	August 17, 2019	IPE Chonburi Stadium 1, Chonburi, Thailand	Timor-Leste	4–0	7–0	2019 AFF Women's Championship
9.	April 22, 2022	Wanderers Football Park, Sydney, Australia	Tonga	3–0	16–0	Friendly
10.	April 22, 2022	Wanderers Football Park, Sydney, Australia	Tonga	10–0	16–0	Friendly
11.	April 22, 2022	Wanderers Football Park, Sydney, Australia	Tonga	13–0	16–0	Friendly

== Honors ==
=== International ===
==== Philippines ====
- Southeast Asian Games third place: 2021
- ASEAN Women's Championship: 2022

==== Kaya–Iloilo ====
- PFF Women's League: 2023
