= Alisha del Campo =

Filipino footballer (born 1999)

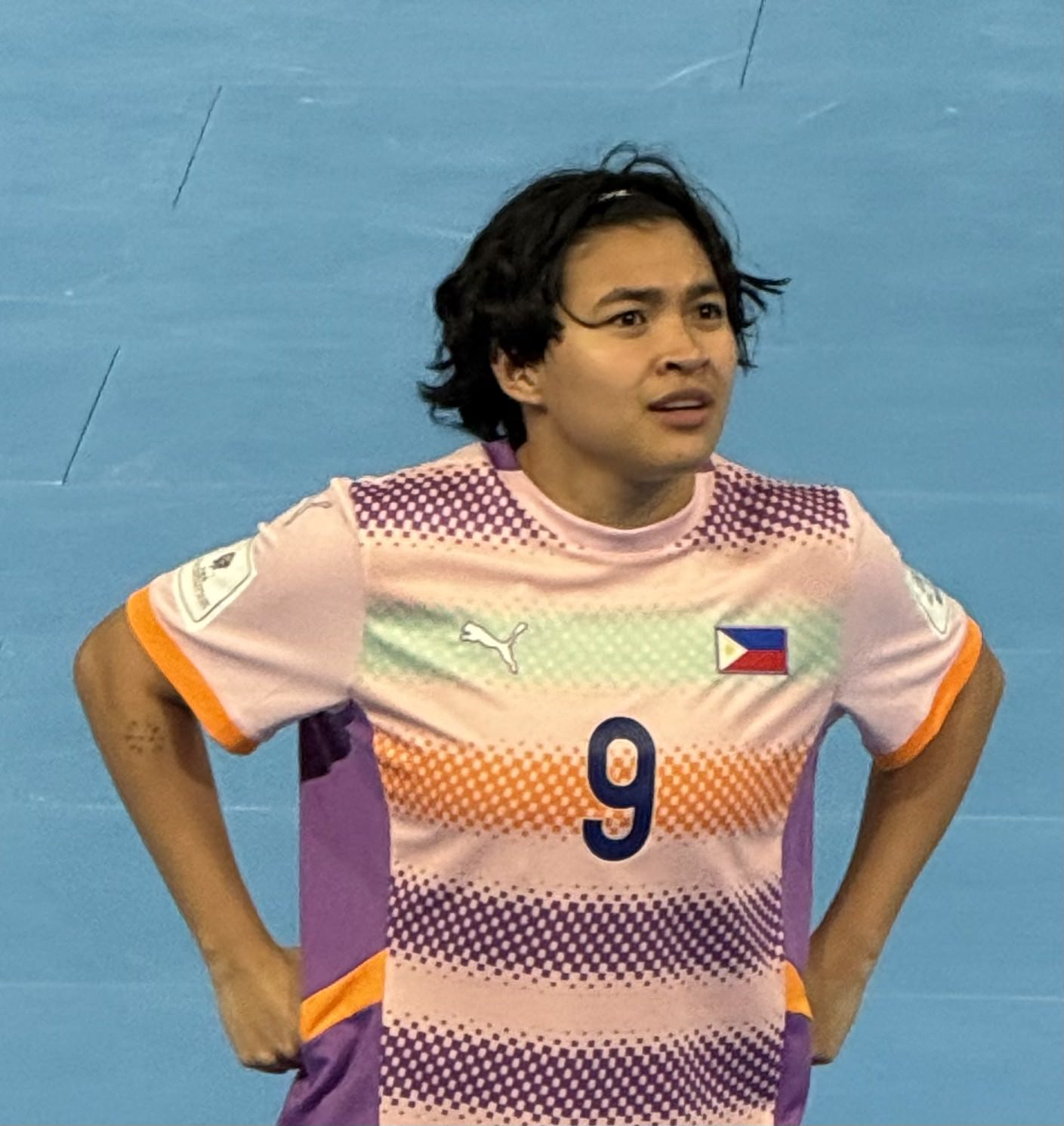
- Del Campo at the 2025 FIFA Futsal Women's World Cup

Personal information
- Full name: Alisha Claire Mendoza del Campo
- Date of birth: September 20, 1999 (age 27)
- Place of birth: Lopez, Quezon, Philippines
- Position: Forward

Team information
- Current team: Kaya–Iloilo
- Number: 27

Youth career
- 2015–2017: De La Salle Zobel

College career
Years	Team	Apps	(Gls)
2018–	De La Salle University		

Senior career*
Years	Team	Apps	(Gls)
2016–2017	Green Archers United		
2025–	Kaya–Iloilo	0	(0)

International career^{‡}
2017–	Philippines	25	(11)
2024–	Philippines (futsal)	13	(2)
Medal record
Women's football
Representing the Philippines
AFF Women's Championship
Winner	2022 Philippines	Team
Southeast Asian Games
Bronze medal – third place	2021 Vietnam	Team
- * Club domestic league appearances and goals ‡ National team caps and goals as of November 27, 2025

Alisha Claire Mendoza del Campo (born September 20, 1999) is a Filipino professional footballer who plays as a forward for PFF Women's League club Kaya–Iloilo and the Philippines national team. She also represents the country at international level in futsal.

== Early life and education ==
Born on September 20, 1999, and native of Lopez, Quezon, Alisha del Campo started playing football at age 11, often joining her brother's team play the sport. She graduated high school from the De La Salle Santiago Zobel School in 2018. She is studying at the De La Salle University.

== Career ==
=== High school ===
Alisha del Campo was scouted by coach Hans-Peter Smit to play for girls' football team of De La Salle Zobel and has participated in the Women's National Collegiate Athletic Association (WNCAA) from 2015 to 2017.

=== Collegiate ===
After graduating from Zobel, Del Campo moved to the high school's associate university, the De La Salle University. She played for the De La Salle Lady Booters of the University Athletic Association of the Philippines (UAAP). In 2019's Season 81, she was named Best Striker and Rookie of the Year. Del Campo also helped De La Salle clinch the women's football title. In March 2020, she was named as the "Pinay Futbolera of the Year" by the online community Pinay Futbol.

The COVID-19 pandemic disrupted women's football in the UAAP with no champions named from Season 82 to 84 (2020–22). Del Campo suited up again for her school in Season 85. However that season and the succeeding one was won by the FEU Lady Tamaraws at the expense of De La Salle in the finals.

=== Club ===
Del Campo played for the now defunct Green Archers United in the PFF Women's League. She was among the top scorers of the 2016-17 season. By the 2018 season, Del Campo was already playing for the De La Salle.

=== International career ===
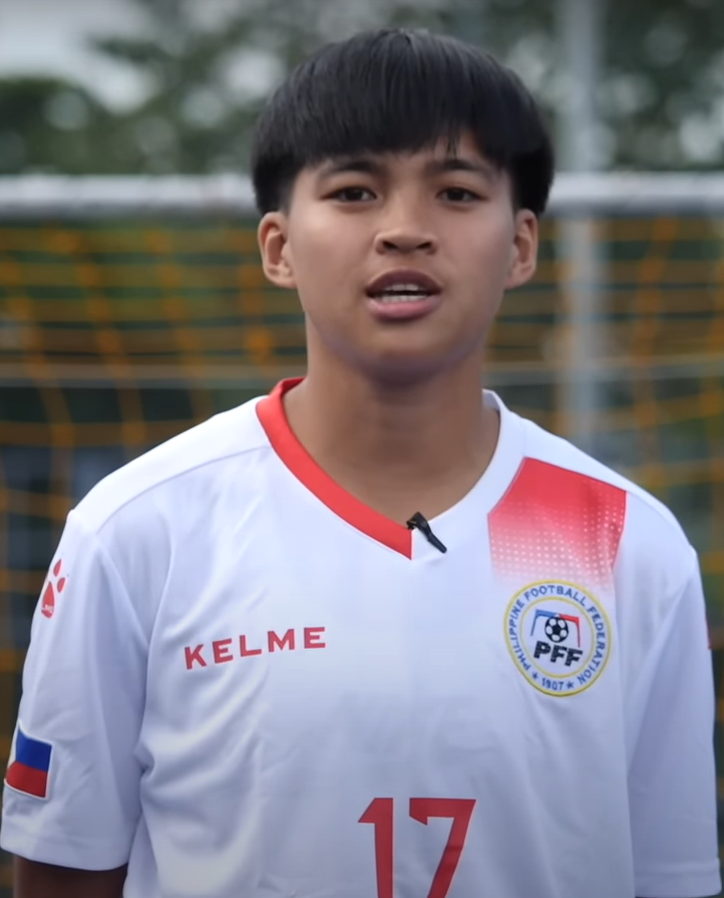
Del Campo with the Philippine women's national football team in 2022

Having never played in any youth national team, del Campo debuted for the Philippines women's national football team at age 17 at the 2018 AFC Women's Asian Cup qualifiers in April 2017. She had her first international cap when she was brought in as a substitute in the Philippines' 4–0 win against the United Arab Emirates. She earned a place in the starting eleven in the match against Iraq. She scored a goal in the team's 1–5 loss to Jordan after she came in as a substitute in the 90th minute.

In the 2019 AFF Women's Championship, del Campo made her first hat-trick in the 4–0 rout against Singapore. The Philippines made their first semifinals appearance in that edition of the tournament.

Del Campo was also part of the Philippine national team that played at the 2017 Southeast Asian Games. She is also part of the Philippine national futsal team which competed in the 2024 ASEAN Women's Futsal Championship

== International goals ==
=== Football ===
Scores and results list the Philippines' goal tally first.

#	Date	Venue	Opponent	Score	Result	Competition
1.	April 12, 2017	Pamir Stadium, Dushanbe	Jordan	1–5	1–5	2018 AFC Women's Asian Cup qualification
2.	April 1, 2019	Grand Hamad Stadium, Doha	Iran	2–0	2–0	2020 AFC Women's Olympic Qualifying Tournament
3	April 9, 2019	Grand Hamad Stadium, Doha	Palestine	2–0	7–0	2020 AFC Women's Olympic Qualifying Tournament
4.	August 3, 2019	PFF National Training Centre, Carmona	Macau	5–0	11–0	Friendly
5.	August 3, 2019	PFF National Training Centre, Carmona	Macau	6–0	11–0	Friendly
6.	August 3, 2019	PFF National Training Centre, Carmona	Macau	7–0	11–0	Friendly
7.	August 3, 2019	PFF National Training Centre, Carmona	Macau	11–0	11–0	Friendly
8.	August 23, 2019	IPE Chonburi Stadium, Chonburi	Singapore	1–0	4–0	2019 AFF Women's Championship
9.	August 23, 2019	IPE Chonburi Stadium, Chonburi	Singapore	3–0	4–0	2019 AFF Women's Championship
10.	August 23, 2019	IPE Chonburi Stadium, Chonburi	Singapore	4–0	4–0	2019 AFF Women's Championship
11.	November 29, 2019	Biñan Football Stadium, Biñan	Malaysia	2–0	5–0	2019 Southeast Asian Games

=== Futsal ===
Scores and results list the Philippines' goal tally first.

#	Date	Venue	Opponent	Score	Result	Competition
1.	November 19, 2024	Philsports Arena, Pasig	Vietnam	1–2	1–6	2024 ASEAN Women's Futsal Championship
2.	May 11, 2025	Hohhot Sports Centre, Hohhot, China	Hong Kong	2–5	3–7	2025 AFC Women's Futsal Asian Cup

== Honors ==
=== International ===
==== Philippines ====
- Southeast Asian Games third place: 2021
- AFF Women's Championship: 2022

=== Collegiate ===
==== De La Salle ====
- UAAP: Season 81 (2018)
- UAAP second place: Season 85 (2023), Season 86 (2024)

=== Individual ===
- UAAP women's football – Best Striker: Season 81 (2018)
- UAAP women's football – Rookie of the Year: Season 81 (2018)
