= 2019–20 PFF Women's League =

PFF Women's League
- Season: 2019–20
- Dates: 27 July 2019 – 16 February 2020
- Champions: De La Salle University; 3rd title
- Matches: 90
- Goals: 394 (4.38 per match)
- Best Player: (Philippines) Anna Delos Reyes (DLSU)
- Top goalscorer: (Philippines) Isabella Bandoja (Tuloy) (30 goals)
- Best goalkeeper: (Philippines) Kimberly Pariña (FEU)
- Highest scoring: Maroons 0–11 Far Eastern University (20 October 2019); Nomads 0–11 Far Eastern University (15 December 2019)

The 2019–20 PFF Women's League season is the third season of the women's national league of the Philippines following the 2018 season.

De La Salle University is the defending champions.

== Format ==
The league adopted a double round-robin format with a projected 90 matches to be played from July 27, 2019. The primary venue for the league's matches is the PFF National Training Centre in Carmona, Cavite. Matches will be usually held in the weekends with select matches to be held during the weekdays. The league's first round ran until mid-October 2019 with the second round beginning on October 19, 2019.

Though initially planned to last until December 2019, the league season's duration was extended to the following year with the first matches of 2020 to be held on January 11, 2020. The season ended in February 2020.

== Clubs ==
10 teams participated in the third season of the league with Maroons FC, Nomads FC, and Tigers FC. making their debuts. 2018 season participants, Ateneo de Manila University, De La Salle Zobel and OutKast decided not to enter for this season while Hiraya had a merger with Stallion to form Hiraya-Stallion F.C..

Club / Team
De La Salle University
Far Eastern University
Green Archers United
Stallion–Hiraya
Maroons
Nomads
Tigers
Tuloy
University of Santo Tomas
University of the Philippines

== Venues ==
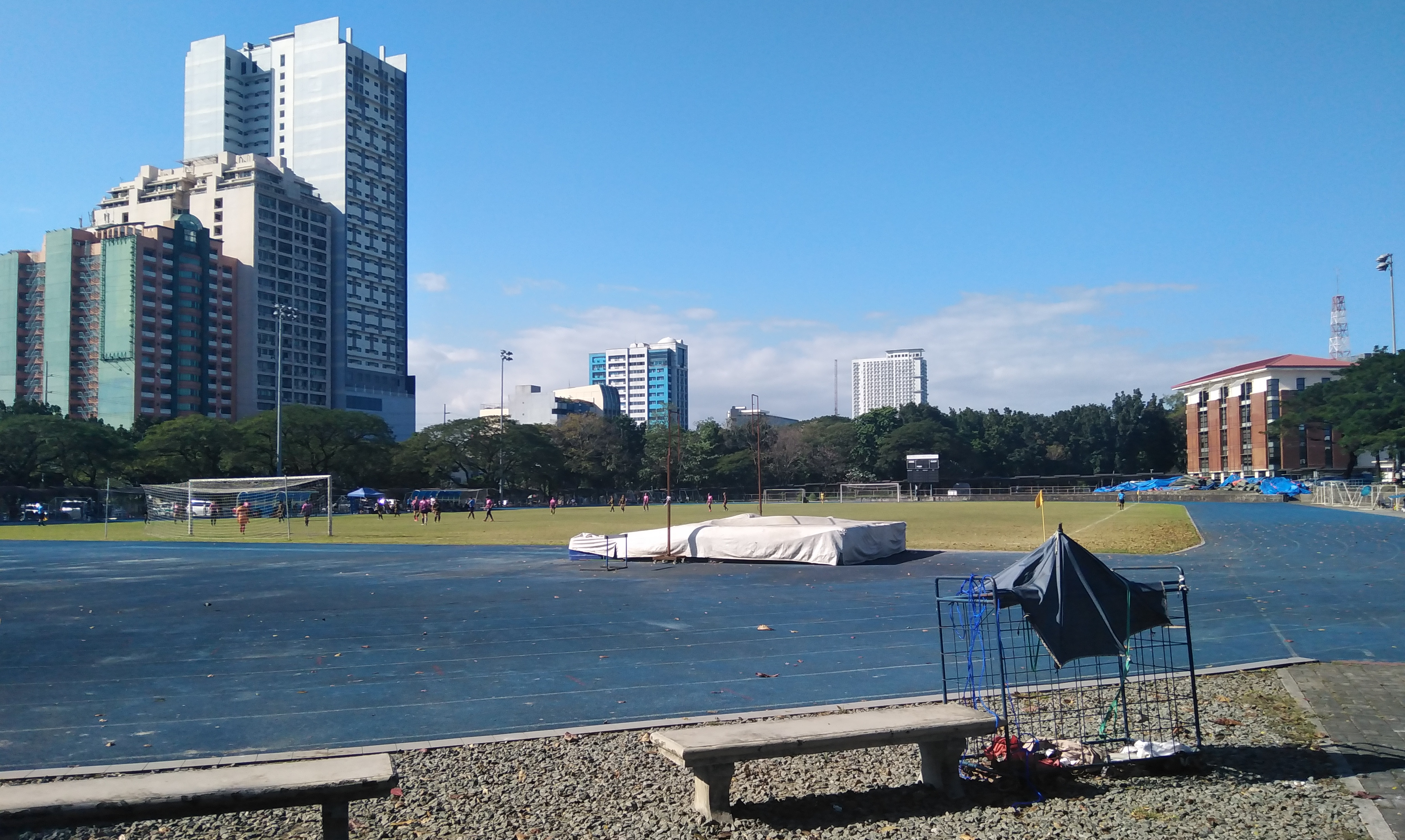
Moro Lorenzo Football Field within the Ateneo de Manila University campus in Quezon City.

The following football venues has hosted league matches:

- De La Salle Canlubang Football Field, Biñan
- Moro Lorenzo Football Field, Quezon City
- UP Diliman Football Field, Quezon City
- PFF National Training Centre, Carmona

== League table ==
Pos	Team	Pld	W	D	L	GF	GA	GD	Pts
1	De La Salle University (C)	18	14	3	1	65	17	+48	45
2	Far Eastern University	18	12	5	1	70	11	+59	41
3	University of Santo Tomas	18	13	1	4	65	19	+46	40
4	University of the Philippines	18	8	4	6	34	30	+4	28
5	Stallion–Hiraya	18	8	3	7	30	24	+6	27
6	Tuloy	18	8	1	9	56	67	−11	25
7	Green Archers United	18	6	0	12	21	52	−31	18
8	Nomads	18	4	3	11	13	48	−35	15
9	Tigers	18	3	1	14	20	54	−34	10
10	Maroons	18	2	3	13	20	72	−52	9

Source: Pinay Futbol
Rules for classification: 1) Points; 2) Goal difference
(C) Champions

== Results ==
=== First round ===
Club/Team	DLS	FEU	GAU	HYA	MRN	NOM	TGR	TLY	UST	UPD
De La Salle University	—	1–1	6–0	3–0	7–2	2–1	1–0	6–1	3–2	6–1
Far Eastern University	1–1	—	3–0	0–0	2–2	4–1	6–0	7–0	0–0	1–2
Green Archers United	0–6	0–3	—	1–0	3–2	0–3	1–0	5–4	0–2	2–5
Stallion–Hiraya	0–3	0–0	0–1	—	1–0 (Note: Match which was held on 3 August 2019 was originally abandoned due to heavy rain in the 60th minute with both teams yet to score a goal. Play was resumed on 29 September 2019.)	2–0	3–0	4–6	2–1	3–0
Maroons	2–7	2–2	2–3	0–1 (Note: Match which was held on 3 August 2019 was originally abandoned due to heavy rain in the 60th minute with both teams yet to score a goal. Play was resumed on 29 September 2019.)	—	0–0	2–1	3–1	1–7	2–4
Nomads	1–2	1–4	3–0	0–2	0–0	—	0–2	2–4	1–5	1–0
Tigers	0–1	0–6	0–1	0–3	1–2	2–0	—	1–4	2–3	1–1
Tuloy	1–6	0–7	4–5	6–4	1–3	4–2	4–1	—	3–6	4–1
University of Santo Tomas	2–3	0–0	2–0	1–2	7–1	5–1	3–2	6–3	—	6–0
University of the Philippines	1–6	2–1	5–2	0–3	4–2	0–1	1–1	1–4	0–6	—

Legend: Blue = left column team win; Yellow = draw; Red = top row team win.

=== Second round ===
Club/Team	DLS	FEU	GAU	HYA	MRN	NOM	TGR	TLY	UST	UPD
De La Salle University	—	2–3	3–1	1–1	6–1	8–0	5–0	4–3	1–0	0–0
Far Eastern University	3–2	—	3–0 (Note: FEU won by default)	2–0	11–0	11–0	3–1	10–0	2–1	1–1
Green Archers United	1–3	0–3 (Note: FEU won by default)	—	0–3	4–1	1–0	0–5	3–6	0–3 (Note: UST won by default)	0–3 (Note: UP won by default)
Stallion–Hiraya	1–1	0–2	3–0	—	3–1	0–0	6–1	1–2	1–5	0–1
Maroons	1–6	0–11	1–4	1–3	—	0–0	1–2	2–7	0–5	0–8
Nomads	0–8	0–11	0–1	0–0	0–0	—	1–0	3–0 (Note: Nomads won by default)	0–8	0–1
Tigers	0–5	1–3	5–0	1–6	2–1	0–1	—	3–7	0–5	1–5
Tuloy	3–4	0–10	6–3	2–1	7–2	0–3 (Note: Nomads won by default)	7–3	—	3–5	1–1
University of Santo Tomas	0–1	1–2	3–0 (Note: UST won by default)	5–1	5–0	8–0	5–0	5–3	—	1–0
University of the Philippines	0–0	1–1	3–0 (Note: UP won by default)	1–0	8–0	1–0	5–1	1–1	0–1	—

Legend: Blue = left column team win; Yellow = draw; Red = top row team win.

== Honors ==
Individual award

- Most Valuable Player: (Philippines) Anna Delos Reyes (De La Salle)
- Best Goalkeeper: (Philippines) Kimberly Pariña (FEU)
- Best Defender: (Philippines) Glyness Dela Cruz (De La Salle)
- Best Midfielder: (Philippines) Shelah Mae Cadag (UST)
- Golden Boot: (Philippines) Isabella Bandoja (Tuloy) with 30 goals

Team

- Fair Play Award: Nomads
