= List of women's football clubs in the Philippines =

List of women's association football clubs in the Philippines sorted by competition. Only clubs which have taken part in the PFF Women's League and/or the PFF Women's Cup are listed.

== PFF Women's League (2016–present) ==
=== Clubs ===
Club	Home locality	Season		Status	Notes
Club	Home locality	First	Most recent	Status	Notes
Azzurri	Makati	2023		Inactive	
Capital1 Solar Strikers	—N/a	2025		Inactive	
Fuego España	—N/a	2016–17		Inactive	Alumni club of students from the University of Santo Tomas
Green Archers United	—N/a	2016–17		Defunct (since 2020)	
Hiraya	—N/a	2016–17	2019–20	Inactive	Founded by Philippine international player, Hanna Maiya Ibarra. Known as Hiraya–Stallion in 2019–20 season due to temporary merger with Stallion.
Kaya–Iloilo	Iloilo City	2016–17	2026	Active	
Makati	Makati	2025		Inactive	
Manila Digger	Manila	2023		Inactive	
Manila Nomads	Carmona	2019–20	2023	Inactive	
Maroons	—N/a	2019–20		Inactive	
OutKast	—N/a	2016–17		Inactive	Formerly went under the name "Lady Tamz", as an alumni football club of the Far Eastern University.
Stallion Laguna	Biñan	2019–20	2023	Inactive	Hiraya–Stallion in 2019–20 season due to temporary merger with Hiraya.
Tigers	—N/a	2019–20		Inactive	
Tuloy	Muntinlupa	2019–20	2023	Inactive	

=== Other teams ===
The PFF Women's League system included teams which are not bona fide clubs, most of which are collegiate varsity teams.

Team	Type	Home locality	Season		Status (Note: Participation in the Philippine Football Federation competitions. These teams' main leagues are either the University Athletic Association of the Philippines (UAAP) and the National Collegiate Athletic Association (NCAA))	Notes
Team	Type	Home locality	First	Most recent	Status	Notes
Ateneo de Manila University (Ateneo Lady Blue Booters (Note: Solely referred as under the moniker, Ateneo Blue Eagles since 2022))	Varsity (University)	Quezon City	2016–17	2018	Inactive	
De La Salle University (De La Salle Lady Booters)	Varsity (University)	Manila	2016–17	2026	Active	
De La Salle Zobel (Zobel Lady Junior Archers)	Varsity (High school)	Manila	2018		Inactive (since 2018)	
Far Eastern University (De La Salle Lady Booters)	Varsity (University)	Manila	2016–17	2026	Active	
University of Santo Tomas (UST Lady Booters)	Varsity (University)	Manila	2016–17	2023	Inactive	
University of the Philippines (Fighting Maroons Booters)	Varsity (University)	Quezon City	2016–17	2026	Active	
The Younghusband Football Academy (Chelsea SS PH)	Football academy	Muntinlupa	2016–17		Inactive	

== PFF Women's Cup (2014–present) ==
The following are clubs which have only exclusively appeared in the PFF Women's Cup.

=== Clubs ===
Club	Home locality	Edition		Status	Notes
Club	Home locality	First	Most recent	Status	Notes
Beach Hut	—N/a	2024		Active	Established in 2019; bills itself as the "first all-girls' football club" in the Philippines. Named after a sunblock brand owned by the Dragon Edge Group.
Lady Tamaraws	—N/a	2015		Inactive	Alumni club of students from the Far Eastern University
Loyola	Manila	2014		Inactive	Nine-a-side only (Note: Only participated in the inaugural 2014 PFF Women's Cup, which had adopted a nine-a-side variant of football.)
Mendiola 1991	Manila	2014		Inactive	Nine-a-side only
Síkat	—N/a	2014	2015	Inactive	

=== Other teams ===
The PFF Women's Cup had participation from teams which are not bona fide clubs.

Team	Type	Home locality	Edition		Status	Notes
Team	Type	Home locality	First	Most recent	Status	Notes
De La Salle–College of Saint Benilde (DLS-CSB Blazers)	Varsity (University)	Manila	2014		Inactive	Nine-a-side only
University of the Philippines–X	Varsity (University)	Quezon City	2015		Inactive	As two separate UP teams. UP have competed as a single unit outside the 2015 edition.
University of the Philippines–Y	Varsity (University)	Quezon City	2015		Inactive	As two separate UP teams. UP have competed as a single unit outside the 2015 edition.

== See also ==
- List of men's football clubs in the Philippines
