= Marielle Benitez =

Filipino footballer (born 1981)

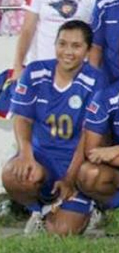
- Benitez with the Philippine national team in 2013

Personal information
- Full name: Marielle Benitez–Javellana
- Birth name: Marielle Moya Benitez
- Date of birth: 2 October 1981 (age 45)
- Place of birth: Quezon City, Philippines
- Position: Midfielder

Team information
- Current team: Green Archers United

Youth career
- c.1995–1998: PAREF Woodrose

College career
Years	Team	Apps	(Gls)
c.2001–2004	De La Salle University		

Senior career*
Years	Team	Apps	(Gls)
- SQS United FC
c. 2016–?	Green Archers United		

International career
	Philippines	61	(5)
- * Club domestic league appearances and goals

Marielle Benitez–Javellana (born 2 October 1981) is a Filipino footballer who formerly played for the Philippine women's national football team. She plays in the midfield position. She is also a sports news anchor.

== Early life and education ==
Benitez was born on 2 October 1981 in Quezon City, Philippines. She first took up various sports in her childhood such as tennis, gymnastics, martial arts, basketball, swimming, volleyball, and underwater hockey. She started playing football when she was on her first year in high school. She first took up the sport at PAREF Woodrose. By her third year, De La Salle coach, Hans Smit took notice of Benitez. Graduating from PAREF Woodrose in 1998, she decided to attend the De La Salle University. She later attained two degrees – in Psychology and Marketing Management.

== Football career ==
=== Collegiate ===
Benitez played at the University Athletic Association of the Philippines for the De La Salle Lady Booters. She scored the winning kick for her squad in the final of UAAP Season 61 beating defending champion, the UST. On her junior year in college, she switched playing position from defender to midfielder and started to lead her squad.

She was awarded various accolades at the inter-college sports tournament such as UAAP Athlete of the Year in 2004, UAAP Most Valuable Players trice, and UAAP Best Striker/Top Scorer twice.

=== Club ===
Benitez played for SQS United FC. By 2016, Benitez is playing for Green Archers United F.C. and participated in the inaugural season of the PFF Women's League.

=== International ===
Benitez played for the Philippine women's national football team. She made four match appearances for the 2003 FIFA Women's World Cup qualifiers. She has made at least 54 appearances for the national team and scored at least 5 goals.

=== Coaching ===
By June 2016, Benitez is already working with the Philippine U-14 girls team as an assistant coach to Joyce Landangan.

=== Non-playing ===
By 2012, Benitez was already appointed as the Sports Development and Physical Education Director of the Philippine Women's University. She also works as a television host, sports analyst and football ambassador for Balls Channel. She also co-presented Road To Rio, a series about the preparation for the 2014 FIFA World Cup. She would also work for One Sports.

== Personal life ==
Benitez is as dancer for the Bayanihan Folk Arts Foundation, the national folk dance company of the Philippines. She is the executive director of the group since 2022. Her mother held the same position until the matriarch's death.

Benitez is married to Negros businessman and long-time friend Dave Torres Javellana since 2019. She also had former Senator Helena Benitez as her aunt.
