= Tuloy F.C. (women) =

Tuloy
- Full name: Tuloy Football Club
- Owner: Tuloy Foundation
- Head coach: Taketomo Suzuki
- League: PFF Women's League; High 5 Futsal League
Home colours	Away colours	Third colours

Tuloy Football Club is a women's professional football club based in Alabang, Muntinlupa, Philippines. The club competes in the PFF Women's League, the top flight women's football league in the Philippines, debuting in 2018. The club is affiliated with the Tuloy Foundation.

== History ==
The Tuloy Football Club majority of players came from the Tuloy Foundation, a street children village. The foundation itself was established in 1996 by the Salesian priest Rocky Evangelista as the founder. Evangelista started Tuloy's football program in 2001, initially only for boys, but later girls also, culminating by establishing bona fide football clubs.

Tuloy, along with De La Salle Zobel, was among the two teams which debuted at the 2018 PFF Women's League season. Their first PFF Women's League match was on August 25, 2018, where they lost 0–1 to De La Salle. They garnered their first win in the league in their following match by outbesting Ateneo 2–1 on September 1, 2018. Tuloy has played Ateneo before in friendly matches, but their win in the PFF Women's League was the first time they officially prevailed over the collegiate side. They placed fourth in their inaugural season and won the Fair Play award. Tuloy player Isabella Bandoja scored the most goals of the season (22) and was awarded the Golden Boot.

In January 2026, Tuloy entered into an agreement with the Clark Development Corporation to develop a home pitch at the Clark Parade Grounds for the club's grassroots program. The club also announced five of its players got signed by clubs in Hong Kong and Cambodia marking a milestone in its history.

== Records ==
Season	Teams	League Position	PFF Women's Cup
2018	10	4th	N/A (not held)
2019–20	10	6th	N/A (not held)
2022–23	10	5th (regular season)	4th
2022–23	10	Did not qualify (final season)	4th
2024	–	N/A (not held)	5th (group stage)

== See also ==
- Tuloy F.C., men's side of the club
