= Women's football in the Philippines =

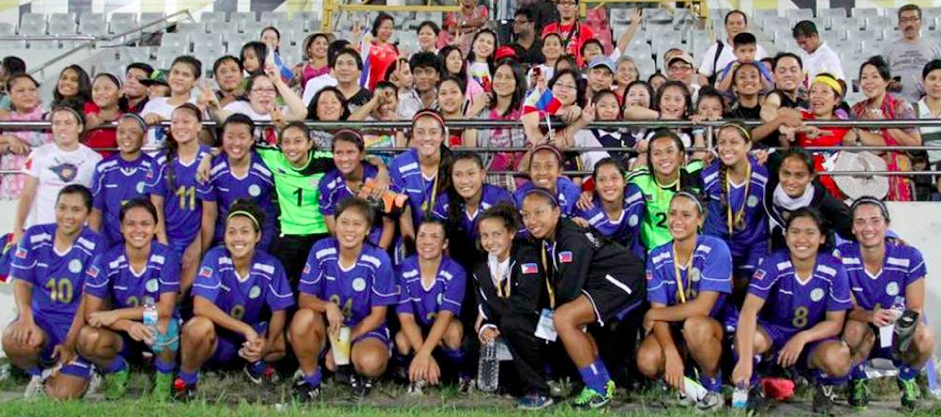
- The national team during the 2014 AFC Women's Asian Cup qualifiers
- Country: Philippines
- Governing body: Philippine Football Federation
- National team: Philippines women's national football team

Club competitions
- PFF Women's League; PFF Women's Cup

International competitions
- FIFA Women's World Cup (national team); AFC Women's Asian Cup (national team); AFC Women's Champions League (club); ASEAN Women's Championship (national team); Asian Games (national team); Southeast Asian Games (national team)

Women's football in the Philippines started largely as an amateur sport. Its top tier league, the PFF Women's League, was largely composed of collegiate teams. The national team has competed in several editions of the AFC Women's Asian Cup.

== History ==
Women's football in the Philippines along with its national team was institutionalized when the Philippine Ladies' Football Association (PLFA or PhiLFA) was established in 1980 by Cristina Ramos. The women's football association organized a league known as the Philippine Ladies' Football National League in 1981. The inaugural season was participated by eight teams mostly consisting of collegiate squads; Philippine Air Force, University of the Philippines Diliman, University of the Philippines Los Banos, Santos Tomas, Baguio Colleges Foundation, Ateneo de Manila University, Pasay Academy and Philippine Union College. University of the Philippines Diliman was the inaugural champions. The PLFA was eventually absorbed by the Philippine Football Federation (PFF).

There were previous attempts to establish a women's league in the Philippines. One such attempt was the Pinay Futbol League which folded in 2013. The following year the PFF organized the PFF Women's Cup. In 2016, the PFF launched the PFF Women's League as a follow-up to the cup competition it launched two years prior.

An organization dedicated to women's football in the country, the Philippine Women's Football Association (PWFA) was established in July 2021. The PWFA intends to coordinate with the federation's existing women's department.

== National competitions ==
The top-flight women's football league in the Philippines is the PFF Women's League. The 2016–2017 season was the inaugural season. The women's football cup for the country is the PFF Women's Cup.

The collegiate football championships of the University Athletic Association of the Philippines (UAAP) also has a women's division.

== National team ==
The Philippine women's national team, also known by their nickname the Filipinas is organized by the Philippine Football Federation. They have regularly competed at the AFC Women's Championship with the Philippines hosting the 1999 edition until qualification phase was introduced in 2006. They returned to the continental tournament in 2019 (now known as the AFC Women's Asian Cup), when they qualified for the first time.

== See also ==
- Football in the Philippines
- Futsal in the Philippines
