= Hanna Ibarra =

Filipino footballer

Hanna Maiya Ibarra
Personal information
- Date of birth: 13 June 1989 (age 37)
- Position: Goalkeeper

Senior career*
Years	Team	Apps	(Gls)
- Green Archers United
2016–	Hiraya F.C.		

International career
- Philippines
- * Club domestic league appearances and goals

Hanna Maiya Ibarra (born 13 June 1989) is a Filipino women's international footballer who plays as a goalkeeper. She is a member of the Philippines women's national football team. She was part of the team at the 2015 AFF Women's Championship. On club level she played for Green Archers United in Philippines.

Ibarra later founded Hiraya F.C. and participated as a player for the club in the inaugural season of the PFF Women's League.
