= David Basa =

Filipino footballer

Personal information
- Full name: David Mark Basa
- Date of birth: 2 April 1989 (age 37)
- Place of birth: Philippines
- Height: 6 ft 0 in (1.83 m)
- Position: Defender

Team information
- Current team: Kaya-Iloilo Women (head coach)

College career
Years	Team	Apps	(Gls)
2010–2011	University of Santo Tomas		

Senior career*
Years	Team	Apps	(Gls)
2012–2013	Global		
2013	Laos		
2013–2017	Stallion		
2017–2019	JPV Marikina	31	(1)
2019–2020	Global	16	(0)
2020–2024	Maharlika Manila	22	(1)

International career^{‡}
2011	Philippines U23		
2010–2013	Philippines	5	(0)

Managerial career
- 2021–2024: Maharlika (technical director)
- 2023–2024: Maharlika
- 2025–: Kaya-Iloilo (women)
- * Club domestic league appearances and goals as of 29 October 2020 ‡ National team caps and goals as of 29 October 2020

David Mark Basa is a Filipino footballer who is currently the head coach for Kaya-Iloilo in the PFF Women's League. He has also played for the Philippine national football team.

== Career ==
Basa began playing football in high school at the Colegio de San Juan de Letran. He continued playing in college, becoming captain of the University of Santo Tomas team.

=== International ===
Basa has trained with the Philippines national football team repeatedly and was selected for the 2010 AFF Suzuki Cup. He played in a 2010 AFF Suzuki Cup qualifying match against Cambodia in October 2010.

Basa has also participated with the Philippines national under-23 football team.
