= Joyce Semacio =

Filipino footballer

Personal information
- Full name: Joyce Omboy Semacio
- Date of birth: January 29, 2000 (age 26)
- Place of birth: Davao City, Philippines
- Position: Forward

Youth career
- 2013: Davao FA
- 2014: DAVRAA
- 2015–2017: Davao City (futsal)

College career
Years	Team	Apps	(Gls)
2021–	Ateneo de Manila University		

International career^{‡}
2014	Philippines U14		
2017–	Philippines U16		
2018–	Philippines	4	(2)
- ‡ National team caps and goals as of July 9, 2018

Joyce Omboy Semacio (born January 29, 2000) is a Filipino footballer who plays as a forward for the Ateneo Blue Eagles and the Philippines women's national team.

== Early life and education ==
Hailing from Davao City, Joyce Omboy Semacio was born on January 29, 2000. She attended the Philippine College of Technology for her secondary studies and Miriam College where she is the sole female scholar for the sport of football.

== Career ==
Joyce Semacio has represented youth sides in the Davao region. At the 2013 Philippine Football Federation (PFF) Mindanao Regional Festival of Football, Semacio helped the Davao FA team win the tournament. She played for the Davao Region Athletic Association (DAVRAA) football team at the 11th Del Monte Football Cup in 2015 helping the regional team win the tournament. She was named as MVP of the football tournament. She also played for the Davao City futsal team at the 2015 and 2017 DAVRAA Meets.

=== International career ===
Semacio has been part of the youth system of the Philippine women's national team. She has played for the Philippine U14 and U16 women's teams. She has included in the Philippine roster for the 2014 AFC U-14 Girls Regional Championship (Southeast Asia) and 2018 AFC U-16 Championship qualifiers in September 2017, and was named as the MVP for the former in which she led the national team to a second-place finish.

Semacio debuted for the senior team in 2018 AFF Women's Championship in the Philippines' 0–4 defeat to Myanmar coming in as a substitute for Anicka Castañeda in the 73rd minute. She made her first start for the national team in the Singapore match where she scored her first goal in the 3–0 win against Singapore.

International goals
Scores and results list the Philippines' goal tally first.

#	Date	Venue	Opponent	Score	Result	Competition
1.	July 3, 2018	Jakabaring Stadium, Palembang, Indonesia	Singapore	1–0	3–0	2018 AFF Women's Championship
2.	July 9, 2018	Jakabaring Stadium, Palembang, Indonesia	Indonesia	2–0	3–3	2018 AFF Women's Championship
3.	April 1, 2019	Grand Hamad Stadium, Doha, Qatar	Iran	1–0	2–0	2020 AFC Women's Olympic Qualifying Tournament
4.	April 5, 2019	Grand Hamad Stadium, Doha, Qatar	Chinese Taipei	1–0	2–4	2020 AFC Women's Olympic Qualifying Tournament
5.	April 9, 2019	Grand Hamad Stadium, Doha, Qatar	Palestine	1–0	7–0	2020 AFC Women's Olympic Qualifying Tournament

=== College career ===
In 2020, Semacio was recruited by the Ateneo Blue Eagles women's football team.
