= 2026 PFF Women's League =

PFF Women's League
- Season: 2026
- Dates: July 4 – August 22, 2026
- Champions: Kaya–Iloilo
- Matches: 14
- Goals: 56 (4 per match)
- Best Player: Alex Carpio
- Top goalscorer: Inday Tolentin (8 goals)
- Best goalkeeper: Jessa Lehayan
- Longest unbeaten run: 7 matches Kaya–Iloilo

The 2026 PFF Women's League is the sixth season of the women's national league of the Philippines following the 2025 season. Kaya–Iloilo are the defending champions.

The 2026 season features four teams, Kaya–Iloilo and three university football teams: Far Eastern University, De La Salle University, and the University of the Philippines. The season started on July 4.

Kaya–Iloilo managed to defend its title by August 11, 2026 winning all of their seven matches, with the PFF awarding the individual honors on the same date.

The season concluded with the third place contest on August 22 (Note: The PFF at the time designated August 15 match between the same sides as the "tussle for third place". The game ended in a 2–1 win for DLSU.) where DLSU drew UP confirming the former's superior placing over the latter.

== Venue ==
Matches are held at the Adidas Football Park in the SM Mall of Asia in Pasay.

Pasay
MOA Football Pitch	MOA Football Pitch (Metro Manila)
Capacity: 1,800	MOA Football Pitch (Metro Manila)

== League table ==
Pos	Team	Pld	W	D	L	GF	GA	GD	Pts
1	Kaya–Iloilo (C)	7	7	0	0	32	4	+28	21
2	Far Eastern University	7	4	0	3	15	14	+1	12
3	De La Salle University	7	2	1	4	5	15	−10	7
4	University of the Philippines	7	0	1	6	4	23	−19	1

Source: PFF (Note: The PFF documents all games of the 2026 PFF Women's League in a single table. The league followed a double round robin format, with the top two teams and bottom two teams playing one extra league game for a total of seven games per team.)
(C) Champions

== Results ==
Double round robin phase

Dates: July 4 – August 15, 2026

Club/Team	DLS	FEU	KAY	UPD
De La Salle University		1–2	7–0	1–0
Far Eastern University	2–0		6–1	1–0
Kaya–Iloilo	3–1	4–1		7–1
University of the Philippines	1–2 (Note: Postponed on July 28 due to inclement weather. Postponed again on August 5.)	0–2	0–3	

Source: PFF (Note: Matchdays: 1, 2, 4, 5 Laban Pilipinas: 3)
Legend: Blue = left column team win; Yellow = draw; Red = top row team win.

Extra league matches

August 11	Kaya–Iloilo	2–0	Far Eastern University	MOA Football Pitch, Pasay
		Report
Note: Kaya already confirmed as league champions at the conclusion of the match.

August 22	De La Salle University	1–1	University of the Philippines	MOA Football Pitch, Pasay
		Report
Note: No extra time held.

== Awards ==
The following awards were given on August 11, 2026. The date when Kaya–Iloilo was awarded the champions, ahead of the final match day on August 15.

Award	Winner	Team
Most Valuable Player	(Philippines) Alex Carpio	Kaya–Iloilo
Golden Boot	(Philippines) Inday Tolentin	Kaya–Iloilo
Best Defender	(Japan) Saki Yoshida	Kaya–Iloilo
Best Midfielder	(Philippines) Sarahgen Tulabing	Far Eastern University
Best Goalkeeper	(Philippines) Jessa Lehayan	Far Eastern University
