= Manila Nomads Sports Club (women) =

Manila Nomads
- Full name: Manila Nomads Sports Club
- Head coach: Shane Cosgrove
- League: PFF Women's League
- 2023: PFF Women's League, 6th of 10

The Manila Nomads Sports Club, or simply the Nomads Sports Club or the Manila Nomads, is a sports club which organizes a women's teams.

Its football team participates in the PFF Women's League, the women's domestic national league of the Philippines.

== Background ==
The Manila Nomads organizes a women's football team which was known as the Nomads StretchMarks. The "StretchMarks" name was coined from the name of Mark Hartmann, the first coach of the team and the fact that the team composes mostly of mothers. They have participated in at least 15 competitions and has joined the Weekend Football League in 2011.

=== PFF Women's League ===
A women's team organized by the club participated in the 2019–20 season of the PFF Women's League. It has joined the subsequent 2023 season.

=== 7's Football League ===
The Nomads had also participated in the women's tournament of the 7's Football League.

== Records ==
Season	Teams	League Position	PFF Women's Cup
2019–20	10	8th	N/A (not held)
2022	—	N/A (not held)	Did not join
2023	10	6th	—

== See also ==
- Manila Nomads Sports Club – men's department
