= PFF Women's Cup =

- Founded: 2014; 12 years ago
- Country: Philippines
- Confederation: AFC (Asia)
- Number of clubs: 6
- Current champions: Stallion Laguna (1st title) (2024)
- Most championships: Far Eastern University (3 titles)
- Broadcaster(s): PFF TV (YouTube)

The PFF Women's Cup is the national women's football cup of the Philippines organized by the Philippine Football Federation.

== History ==
=== Establishment and 9-a-side edition ===
The inaugural edition was launched in 2014 by the Philippine Football Federation (PFF) and was contested by 10 teams from June to July. The cup was played in a 9-a-side format with two halves of 25 minutes.

The following teams participated at the inaugural 9-a-side edition with their division in the group stage.

Group A	Group B
Far Eastern University	University of Santo Tomas
Green Archers United	College of St. Benilde
Síkat	University of the Philippines
Chelsea S.S. PH	Ateneo de Manila
Mendiola	Loyola Meralco Sparks

=== Succeeding editions ===
The following edition in 2015 was played in full 90 minutes with 11 field players on each team. 10 teams participated in the match mostly composed by University varsity and alumni teams. In 2016, the PFF Women's League was launched although the PFF would stop organizing the cup tournament.

The PFF revived the Women's Cup in late 2022, following two years of inactivity due to the COVID-19 pandemic. The competition had eight teams. The cup tournament returned in 2024.

The 2025 edition which featured four clubs began on October 11, 2025. With two matches played, the tournament was later cancelled without any official announcement. It was to resume on January 2026 to "accommodate player and club schedules"..

== Winners ==
Year	Teams	Winner	Result	Runner up	Final venue
2014	8	Far Eastern University	1–1(2–1 PSO)	Chelsea S.S. PH	Rizal Memorial Stadium (Manila)
2015	10	Far Eastern University	2–1	De La Salle University	Rizal Memorial Stadium (Manila)
2022	8	Far Eastern University	2–0	University of the Philippines	PFF National Training Center, (Carmona, Cavite)
2024	6	Stallion Laguna	1–0	Kaya–Iloilo	Rizal Memorial Stadium (Manila)
2025–26	4	Cancelled			
