= 2018 PFF Women's League =

Women's League Of Philippines

PFF Women's League
- Season: 2018
- Dates: August 25 – November 11
- Champions: De La Salle University; 2nd title
- Matches: 43
- Goals: 221 (5.14 per match)
- Best player: (Philippines) Chelo Hodges (DLSU)
- Top goalscorer: (Philippines) Isabella Bandoja (Tuloy) (22 goals)
- Best goalkeeper: (Philippines) Natasha Lacson (DLSU)
- Highest scoring: 17 goals DLSU 17–0 DLSZ (September 29, 2018)

The 2018 PFF Women's League season is the second season of the women's national league of the Philippines following the 2016–17 season.

The organization of a second season for the league was reported as early as July 2018. Ten clubs participated for the second season which will run from August 25 to November 11 2018, with De La Salle Zobel and Tuloy F.C. making their debuts.

The University of Santo Tomas and the De La Salle University played against each other in the de facto final on November 11, 2018 where the latter won 2–1 over the former.

== Format ==
The league followed a single round robin format for the second season. Matches are to be played on weekends. The primary venue for the league's matches is the PFF National Training Centre in Carmona, Cavite with the Rizal Memorial Stadium designated as an alternate venue. As of this season the league's players reportedly are compliant with the MyPFF online registration system of the Philippine Football Federation.

== Clubs ==
10 teams participated in the second season of the league with De La Salle Zobel and Tuloy F.C. making their debuts. 2016–17 season participants, Fuego España and The Younghusband Football Academy decided not to enter for this season.

Club / Team
Ateneo de Manila University
De La Salle University
De La Salle Zobel
Far Eastern University
Green Archers United
Hiraya
OutKast
Tuloy
University of Santo Tomas
University of the Philippines

== League table ==
Pos	Team	Pld	W	D	L	GF	GA	GD	Pts
1	De La Salle University (C)	9	8	1	0	37	5	+32	25
2	University of Santo Tomas	9	7	0	2	43	6	+37	21
3	Far Eastern University	9	6	1	2	32	10	+22	19
4	Tuloy	9	5	1	3	34	22	+12	16
5	Hiraya	9	4	2	3	20	14	+6	14
6	Ateneo de Manila University	9	4	1	4	20	17	+3	13
7	OutKast	9	3	1	5	24	19	+5	10
8	University of the Philippines	9	1	2	6	11	40	−29	5
9	Green Archers United	9	1	1	7	6	32	−26	4
10	De La Salle Zobel	9	1	0	8	7	66	−59	3

Source: Philippine Football Federation
Rules for classification: No information
(C) Champions

== Results ==
- Format: Single round robin

Club/Team	ATE	DLS	DLZ	FEU	GAU	HYA	OUT	TLY	UST	UPD
Ateneo de Manila University	—	0–4	3–0 (Note: Ateneo won by default)	1–3	8–0	2–1	3–2	1–2	0–3	2–2
De La Salle University	4–0	—	17–0	3–1	2–1	4–0	1–1	1–0	2–1	3–1
De La Salle Zobel	0–3 (Note: Ateneo won by default)	0–17	—	0–10	2–1	0–3	2–10	2–6	0–12	1–5
Far Eastern University	3–1	1–3	10–0	—	9–0	1–1	0–2	3–2	3–0	2–1
Green Archers United	0–8	1–2	1–2	0–9	—	1–2	1–0	0–3 (Note: Tuloy won by default.)	1–7	1–1
Hiraya	1–2	0–4	3–0	1–1	2–1	—	3–2	1–1	0–3	9–0
OutKast	2–3	1–1	10–2	2–0	0–1	2–3	—	6–3	0–2	4–1
Tuloy	2–1	0–1	6–2	2–3	3–0 (Note: Tuloy won by default.)	1–1	6–3	—	0–11	14–0
University of Santo Tomas	3–0	1–2	12–0	0–3	7–1	3–0	2–0	11–0	—	4–0
University of the Philippines	2–2	1–3	5–1	1–2	1–1	9–0	1–4	0–14	0–4	—

Legend: Blue = left column team win; Yellow = draw; Red = top row team win.

== Honors ==
Individual award

- Most Valuable Player: (Philippines) Chelo Hodges (De La Salle)
- Best Goalkeeper: (Philippines) Natasha Lacson (De La Salle)
- Best Defender: (Philippines) Mariell Tejada (De La Salle)
- Best Midfielder: (Philippines) Hazel Lustan (UST)
- Golden Boot: (Philippines) Isabella Bandoja (Tuloy) with 24 goals

Team

- Fair Play Award: Tuloy F.C.
