= Isabella Bandoja =

Filipino footballer (born 2001)

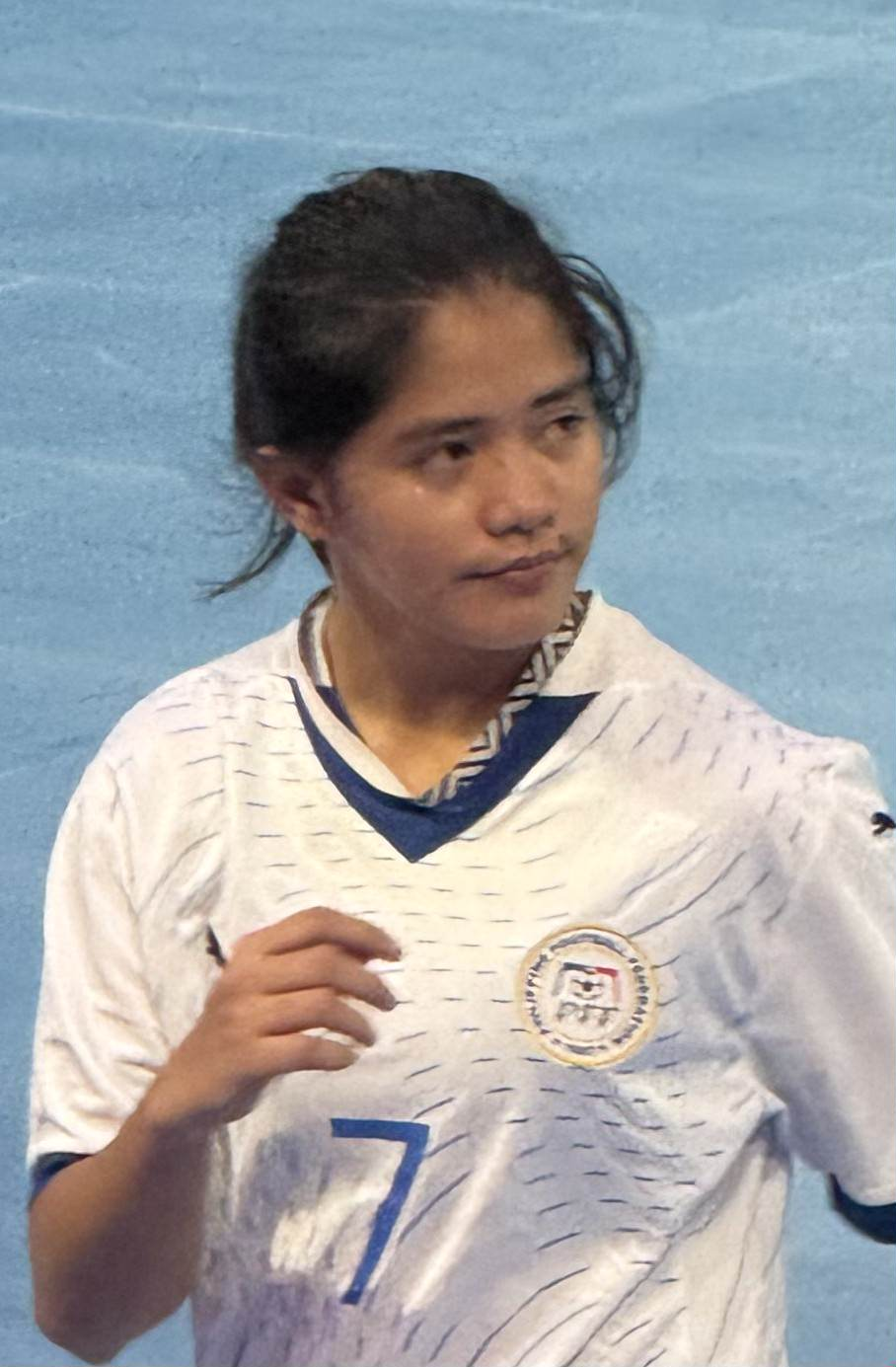
- Bandoja at the 2025 FIFA Futsal Women's World Cup

Personal information
- Full name: Isabella Marie Rabano Bandoja
- Date of birth: March 30, 2001 (age 25)
- Place of birth: Libmanan, Philippines

Team information
- Current team: TSL
- Number: 19

Senior career*
Years	Team	Apps	(Gls)
2018–	Tuloy	36	(73)
2025	→ Pinay5		
2026–	→ TSL		

International career^{‡}
2023–	Philippines (futsal)	15	(6)
- * Club domestic league appearances and goals as of August 2026 ‡ National team caps and goals as of November 27, 2025

Isabella Marie Rabano Bandoja (born March 30, 2001) is a Filipino women's professional footballer who plays for Hong Kong Women's League club TSL. She represents the Philippines at international level for futsal.

== Early life ==
Bandoja was born on March 30, 2001. At 14 years old, Bandoja was admitted by the Tuloy sa Don Bosco; a foundation for abandoned and indigent children ran by Catholic priest Rocky Evangelista. Football was initially just a hobby for Bandoja but she was able to pursue the sport more seriously after the foundation established a football program for girls.

== Career ==
=== Club ===
Bandoja became part of Tuloy around 2014 or 2015. She played for her foundation's club Tuloy F.C. in the PFF Women's League. She was the top scorer for the 2018 and 2019–20 seasons.

Her career went into hiatus in 2020 due to the COVID-19 pandemic. She did not play in the 2022 PFF Women's Cup but returned to the PFFWL for the 2023 season. Along with Dela Salle's Angelica Teves, Bandoja was named co-awardee of the golden boot with both women 19 goals each for the season.

In 2025, Bandoja joined the Pinay5 Futsal Club to play in the High 5 Futsal League.

In January 2026, Bandoja joined Hong Kong club TSL coming in from Tuloy.

=== International ===
Bandoja has been part of pool of the Philippines women's national team since 2019. She has been invited to take part in the team's training camp at least thrice; the latest being in 2023. She has yet to make her first international cap. Bandoja would be named part of the Philippine squad for the 2024 Pinatar Cup and later for the pair of friendlies against South Korea in April 2024.

She has played for the Philippines national futsal team at the 2023 PFF Women's Tri Nations Futsal Invitational where the team finished second. She captained the Philippine squad which took part at the 2024 ASEAN Women's Futsal Championship in Pasig. She was the team's top scorer, making two out of four goals.

In December 2024, Bandoja along with three fellow players resigned from the national futsal team after the PFF relieved Vic Hermans as head coach and announced a mandatory camp on short notice ahead of the 2025 AFC Women's Futsal Asian Cup qualifiers citing that the women's futsal is disorganized.

However, Bandoja is among the players announced in April 2025 to have received a call-up for the 2025 AFC Women's Futsal Asian Cup competition proper, which the Philippines managed to qualify for. She also played in the 2025 FIFA Futsal Women's World Cup and scored the only goal of host Philippines in their 1–5 defeat to Argentina in the group stage.

== Career statistics ==
International
Scores and results list the Philippines' goal tally first, score column indicates score after each Bandoja goal.

Philippine women's national futsal team goals
No.	Date	Venue	Opponent	Score	Result	Competition	Ref.
1.	October 19, 2023	Ninoy Aquino Stadium, Manila, Philippines	Indonesia	2–5	4–9	PFF Women's Tri Nation Futsal Invitational	
2.	October 22, 2023	Ninoy Aquino Stadium, Manila, Philippines	Indonesia	1–2	2–5	PFF Women's Tri Nation Futsal Invitational	
3.	November 16, 2024	Philsports Arena, Pasig, Philippines	Myanmar	1–0	2–2	2024 ASEAN Women's Futsal Championship	
4.	November 20, 2024	Philsports Arena, Pasig, Philippines	Indonesia	1–0	1–2	2024 ASEAN Women's Futsal Championship	
5.	May 11, 2025	Hohhot Sports Centre, Hohhot, China	Hong Kong	3–7	3–7	2025 AFC Women's Futsal Asian Cup	
6.	November 27, 2025	Philsports Arena, Pasig, Philippines	Argentina	1–5	1–5	2025 FIFA Futsal Women's World Cup	

== Honors ==
Individual

- PFF Women's League Golden Boot: 2018, 2019–20, 2023
