= Escola Portuguesa de Díli =

Portuguese School of Díli
- Portuguese: Escola Portuguesa de Díli – Centro de Ensino e Língua Portuguesa Ruy Cinatti
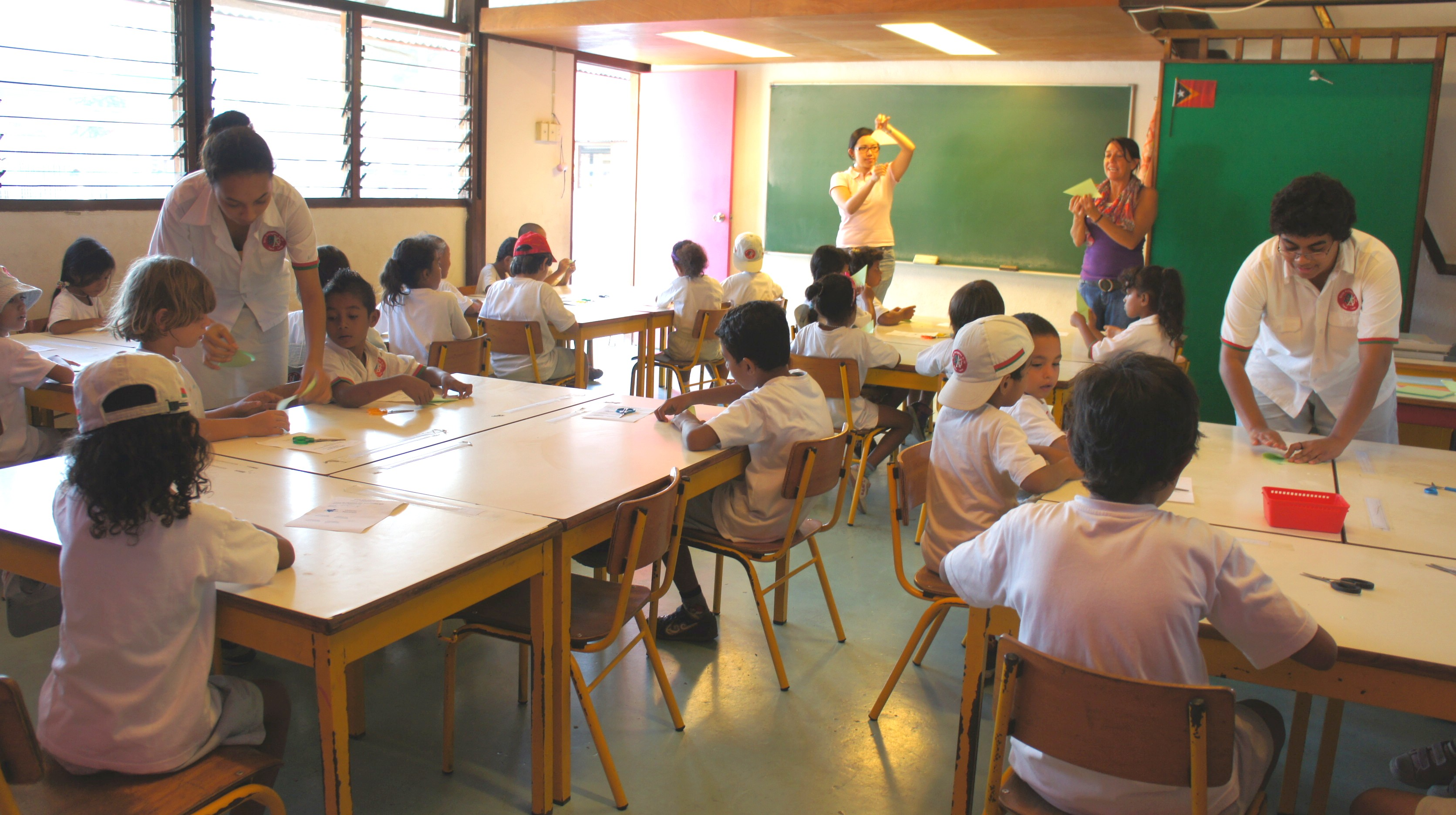
- A classroom of Escola Portuguesa Ruy Cinatti

Location
- Santa Cruz, Díli; Timor Leste; 8°33′53″S 125°35′08″E

Information
- Other name: EPRC-CELP
- Former names: Escola Portuguesa de Díli; Escola Portuguesa de Díli – Centro de Ensino e Língua Portuguesa
- Type: International school
- Established: 2002; 24 years ago
- Grades: Pre-school, K-12
- Language: Portuguese; English
- Website: epd-celp.org

Escola Portuguesa de Díli – Centro de Ensino e Língua Portuguesa Ruy Cinatti (EPD-CELP) is a Portuguese international school in Santa Cruz, Dili, East Timor.

It serves levels from preschool through senior high school.

== History ==
The school opened in 2002 as the Escola Portuguesa de Díli. It was later renamed to Escola Portuguesa de Díli – Centro de Ensino e Língua Portuguesa in 2009, and it received its current name during the 2011–2012 school year.

== Student body ==
As of 2015, there were 871 students, with 87.1% being East Timorese, 9.5% being Portuguese, and 3.4% coming from other countries. They were, as of the same year, divided into 35 classes.
