= Kaya F.C.–Iloilo (women) =

Women's association football club based in Iloilo City, Philippines

Kaya–Iloilo
- Full name: Kaya Women's Futbol Club-Iloilo
- Nickname: The Mighty Kaya
- Short name: KAY
- Founded: 2019; 7 years ago
- Ground: Iloilo Sports Complex
- Capacity: 7,000
- Owner(s): Una Kaya Futbol Club, Inc.
- Chairman: Santi Araneta
- Head coach: David Basa
- League: PFF Women's League
- 2025: PFF Women's League, 1st of 6 (champions)
- Website: https://www.kayafc.com/women/
Home colours	Away colours	Third colours

Kaya Futbol Club–Iloilo (Tagalog pronunciation: [ˈkaja futbol]), or simply Kaya–Iloilo, commonly referred to as Kaya Women's, is a Filipino women's professional football club affiliated with Kaya F.C.–Iloilo.

== History ==
Kaya was the only Philippines Football League (PFL) club that fielded in the 2016–17 inaugural season of the PFF Women's League. However, they withdrew midseason.

In 2019, Kaya officially formed a women's team. The seven-a-side team competed in the inaugural season of the 7's Football League Women's Division, where they finished runners-up.

Kaya completed their first eleven-a-side campaign, as well as their international debut, at the 2022 SingaCup's Women Football Championship in Singapore. They swept the tournament, beating the Lion City Sailors women's team, Phranakorn, and Persib Putri.

Kaya returned to the PFF Women's League for the 2023 season. For that season, there was a knock-out stage. Kaya was able to reach the final where it contended the title against Manila Digger. Kaya emerged as the victor through a single goal, becoming the first ever club team to win the PFF Women's League. The preceding editions were clinched by collegiate sides, De La Salle.

Kaya was among the participating teams of the inaugural AFC Women's Champions League in 2024–25. They failed to advance to the knock-out stage drawing against BGC–College of Asian Scholars and Bam Khatoon and conceding a lost to Melbourne City in the group stage.

== Crest and colors ==
Kaya Women's wear the same crest and colors as the men's team. The club's home color is yellow.

The club's colors: yellow, red, green and black, are based on the pan-African colors associated with Rastafari due to the influence of Reggae in the club's founding members' lives. The 31 stars on the crest are a tribute to Kaya Men's co-founder John-Rey "Lupoy" Bela-ong, who was killed in a robbery at age 31.

== Players ==
As of June 21, 2026

Note: Flags indicate national team as defined under FIFA eligibility rules; some limited exceptions apply. Players may hold more than one non-FIFA nationality.

No.	Pos.	Nation	Player
1	GK	PHI	Inna Palacios
3	DF	PHI	Christine Hulleza
6	FW	PHI	Shelah Cadag
7	FW	PHI	Camille Rodriguez
8	MF	USA	Julia Humphreys
11	DF	PHI	Lyka Cuenco
13	DF	PHI	Anna Delos Reyes
15	FW	PHI	Dionesa Tolentin
16	FW	PHI	Maria Tanjangco
17	MF	PHI	Erma Balacua
18	MF	PHI	Maegan Alforque
19	MF	PHI	Rocelle Mandaño

No.	Pos.	Nation	Player
20	DF	PHI	Jonela Miravite
21	MF	PHI	Sara Arrieta
22	FW	PHI	Joyce Onrubia
23	MF	PHI	Sheen Borres
25	MF	PHI	Nathalie Absalon
26	DF	PHI	Janly Fontamillas
27	FW	PHI	Alisha Del Campo
28	GK	PHI	Jessica Pido
29	MF	ESP	Judit Peran Pericas
32	MF	PHI	Anaiah Sotto
67	MF	PHI	Sophia Lyttle
88	MF	PHI	Carmela Altiche
95	GK	PHI	Kiara Fontanilla

== Personnel ==
As of March 2025

Position	Name
Head coach	(Philippines) David Basa
Assistant coach	(Japan) Yu Hoshide
Team manager	(Philippines) Camelo Tacusalme

=== Coaching history ===
- (Philippines) Let Dimzon (2019–2024)
- (Philippines) David Basa (2025–)

== Honors ==
=== Domestic ===
==== League ====
- PFF Women's League
  - Winners: 2023, 2025, 2026

==== Cups ====
- PFF Women's Cup
  - Runners-up: 2024

=== International ===
==== Cups ====
- SingaCup
  - Winners: 2022

=== Other honors ===
- 7's Football League
  - Winners: 2024

== Records ==
=== Main domestic competitions ===
Season	Teams	League Position	PFF Women's Cup
2016–17	11	N/A (withdrew)	N/A (not held)
2022–23	10	1st (regular season)	3rd
2022–23	10	1st (finals)	3rd
2024	6	N/A (not held)	2nd
2025	6	1st	N/A (canceled)
2026	4	1st	–

=== AFC Women's Champions League ===
As of 7 November 2026

All results (away, home and aggregate) list Kaya–Iloilo's goal tally first.

Competition	Pld	W	D	L	GF	GA	GD
AFC Champions League	9	2	3	4	12	23	–11
Total	9	2	3	4	12	23	–11

Season	Round	Opponents	Result	Agg. / Pos.
2024–25	Group stage	(Thailand) College of Asian Scholars	0–0	Group B (3rd)
2024–25	Group stage	(Iran) Bam Khatoon	1–1	Group B (3rd)
2024–25	Group stage	(Australia) Melbourne City	0–4	Group B (3rd)
2026–27	Preliminary stage	(Kyrgyzstan) Ilbirs	6–0	Group B (1st)
2026–27	Preliminary stage	(Cambodia) Phnom Penh Crown	5–1	Group B (1st)
2026–27	Preliminary stage	(Hong Kong) TSL	0–0	Group B (1st)
2026–27	Group stage	(China) Beijing Jingtan	0–6	Group C
2026–27	Group stage	(Australia) Melbourne City	0–7	Group C
2026–27	Group stage	(Uzbekistan) Nasaf	0–4	Group C

=== Invitational tournaments ===
Season	Competition	Round	Club	Score		Agg. / Pos.
Season	Competition	Round	Club	Home	Away	Agg. / Pos.
2022	SingaCup Women Football Championship	Group Stage	(Singapore) Lion City Sailors	3–1		Champion
2022	SingaCup Women Football Championship	Group Stage	(Thailand) Phranakorn FC	6–0		Champion
2022	SingaCup Women Football Championship	Group Stage	(Indonesia) Persib Bandung Putri	8–0		Champion

== Performance in AFC competitions ==
- AFC Women's Champions League: 1 appearance

2024–25: Group stage
