= Zobel Lady Junior Archers football =

Philippine association football club

- Full name: De La Salle Santiago Zobel School women's junior football team
- Nickname: Zobel Lady Junior Archers
- Ground: De La Salle Zobel Football Field; Muntinlupa, Philippines
- Owner: De La Salle Santiago Zobel School
- League: PFF Women's League
- 2018: 10th

The Zobel Lady Junior Archers may refer to the women's football team of the De La Salle Santiago Zobel School which competed in the PFF Women's League, the top-flight women's football league in the Philippines. De La Salle Zobel, along with Tuloy F.C., debuted in the 2018 season of the league. Their first league match was on August 25, 2018, where they were routed by OutKast 2–10.

== See also ==
- Zobel Junior Archers
