= The Younghusband Football Academy =

- Short name: TYFA
- Founded: 2010; 16 years ago
- League: PFF Women's League (2016–17)
- Location: Alabang, Muntinlupa, Metro Manila
- Home ground: Gatorade–Chelsea F.C. Blue Pitch; Makati, Metro Manila
- President: Phil Younghusband
- CEO: Cathy Nazareno-Rivilla
- Branches: Chelsea S.S. PH; The Younghusband Football Academy

The Younghusband Football Academy Inc. (TYFA) is a football academy based in the Philippines. A women's football team from the academy participated in the 2016–17 season of the PFF Women's League, the top flight women's football league in the Philippines.

== History ==
Philippine international footballers, Phil and James Younghusband established The Younghusband Football Academy in Alabang in 2010 under the name "Younghusband Football Academy, Inc.". becoming the first football academy in the country. The academy started a partnership with Chelsea F.C. in 2012 which provided instructors for the academy. The first classes were held at the Evia Football Field in Daang Reyna, Las Piñas. By May 2012, the academy registered with the Pag-IBIG Fund. The Younghusbands initially had difficulty in operating the academy due to the relative lack of popularity of football then. The duo initially conducted programs within Metro Manila but later also reach to localities outside the metropolis such as Cavite, Bacolod, Legaspi, Tarlac and Palawan.

== Competitive football ==
The TYFA participated at the 2016 Pilipinas Cup fielding 7 teams. The TYFA participated as "Chelsea FC Philippines".

=== Women's ===
Their women's team have participated at the PFF Women's Cup which was launched in 2013 as "Chelsea SS PH" and participated in the inaugural 2016–17 season of the PFF Women's League, the top-flight of women's football in the country.

==== Honors ====
PFF Women's Cup

- Runner-up: 1 (2014; seven-a-side)
