= Philippine College of Technology =

Private college in Davao City, Philippines

- Motto: "We Don’t Build Hopes, We Build Future"
- Type: Private, vocational
- Established: 1993
- Location: Garden Park, Village, Bajada, Davao City, Davao del Sur, Philippines; 7°05′09″N 125°36′31″E
- Campus: Bajada, Davao City (main) and branches
- Colors: Green and yellow
- Website: www.pctdavao.edu.ph
- Location in Mindanao Location in the Philippines

The Philippine College of Technology (PCT), previously known as Philippine School of Technology, is located in Garden Park Village, Bajada, Davao City. It has campuses in Bajada and Calinan in Davao City.

== History ==
The college was established in 1993 by Gener Balili. In 2000, the school officially became Philippine College of Technology with the introduction of its first degree program, Bachelor of Science in hotel and restaurant management.

PCT is a TESDA-accredited competency assessment center for bartending, commercial cooking, computer systems servicing, food and beverage services, front office services, health care services, housekeeping and pharmacy services. It has an IELTS review center.

PCT has a Public Employment Services Office accredited by the Department of Labor and Employment which facilitates jobs placement for its students and alumni.
