= PFF National Training Center =

Philippine football training ground

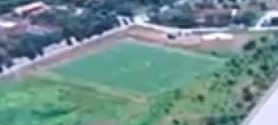
- Interactive map of PFF National Training Center
- Address: Carmona, Cavite; Philippines
- Coordinates: 14°17′41.7″N 121°02′19.9″E
- Owner: Manila Jockey Club
- Operator: Philippine Football Federation
- Main venue: FIFA Football Turf; Capacity: 1,000
- Facilities: 2 secondary football pitches

Construction
- Groundbreaking: 30 November 2014
- Opened: 9 September 2017

Tenants
- PFF Women's League; Philippines Football League (alternate venue); Copa Paulino Alcantara; Philippines men's national football team Philippines women's national football team Philippines national under-23 football team Philippines national under-19 football team Philippines national under-17 football team Philippines women's national football team Philippines women's national under-20 football team Azkals Development Academy

Website
- www.manilajockey.com

The PFF National Training Center or the National Football Center is a football ground at the San Lazaro Leisure and Business Park in Carmona, Cavite.

== History ==
Plans to construct a football facility in Carmona, Cavite were announced as early as June 2014. The Philippine Football Federation signed a lease agreement for rights to land occupying an area of 2 hectares (4.9 acres) to build a training center, initially known as the National Teams Training Center, to be built under the $500 thousand FIFA Goal Project 3.

The groundbreaking ceremony for the facility located within the San Lazaro Leisure and Business Park of the Manila Jockey Club was held on 30 November 2014 and was led by then FIFA President Sepp Blatter. It was projected to be complete by 2015 but the facility was inaugurated two years later.

The facility was formally inaugurated on 9 September 2017 which included the turnover ceremony of its main field, the FIFA Football Turf. After the launch the first two football matches were held in field. The first women's football match held in the field was a friendly between the University of the Philippines and the De La Salle University while the first men's football match was an official Ang Liga pre-season match between the San Beda College and the Ateneo de Manila University. The former secured a 3–0 win over the latter. On the same day the groundbreaking ceremony for a new PFF House of Football within the center was made.

== FIFA Football Turf ==
The training center hosts an international-sized artificial turf, the FIFA Football Turf which is accredited with a FIFA two-star field rating. The pitch of the artificial pitch was by United States firm, ATC Global and has a dimension of 105 x 68 m (344 x 223 ft). Upon its inauguration the seating capacity of the FIFA Football Turf is about 1,000 to 1,200. Earlier in 2014, plans of a viewing area of about 20,000 to 30,000 capacity was reported.

Lighting towers with an intensity of 900 lux is planned to be installed by the end of 2018. There are plans to convert the pitch into a stadium.

=== Other pitches ===
Two miniature artificial turfs measuring 40 by 20 meters (131 ft × 66 ft) will be installed beside the main football pitch which are meant for recreation use and hosting of festival competitions. Likewise the grass area in the middle of the Manila Jockey Club's racetrack is also planned to be converted into a football field.

== Use ==
The facility is planned to serve as the training ground of both the men's and women's national football teams of the Philippines. Both senior and youth teams utilize the facility. Within September 2017, the Youth Football League plans to hold their matches at the center.

The center hosted matches of the second round of the 2017 PFF Women's League. The women's national team used the venue in March 2018 as part of their preparation for their 2018 AFC Women's Asian Cup stint.

== Ownership ==
The Manila Jockey Club leases the land to the Philippine Football Federation, as secondary ground to Rizal Memorial Stadium. The PFF has leasing rights to the land which is valid until 2039.

== See also ==
- List of football stadiums in the Philippines
- New Clark City Athletics Stadium
- Philippine Sports Stadium
- Biñan Football Stadium
- Panaad Stadium
