= 2016–17 PFF Women's League =

PFF Women's League
- Season: 2016–17
- Dates: 12 November 2016 – 20 November 2017
- Champions: De La Salle University; 1st title
- Matches: 65
- Goals: 276 (4.25 per match)
- Best player: (Philippines) Sara Castañeda (DLSU)
- Top goalscorer: (Philippines) Kyra Dimaandal (DLSU) (21 goals)
- Best goalkeeper: (Philippines) Inna Palacios (DLSU)
- Highest scoring: 16 goals DLSU 16–0 TYFA (November 18, 2017)
- Statistics disregards matches involving Kaya F.C. which withdrew mid-season.

The 2016–17 PFF Women's League was the inaugural season of the women's national league of the Philippines. The season started on November 12, 2016 and ended on November 20, 2017.

The De La Salle University secured the league title on their first second round match against OutKast winning over the latter, 3–0.

== Format ==
The league follows a double round robin format. The team with the most points by the end of the season are crowned champions. The first round which was held at the Rizal Memorial Stadium commenced in November 12, 2016 and lasted until July 2017.

The second round was initially scheduled to take place from May 20, 2017 to July 16, 2017, three months after the end of the first round at the Biñan Football Stadium. The second round resumed in mid-October at the PFF National Training Centre in Carmona, Cavite with format changes. The ten teams competing were divided into two groups randomly for the second round with each team playing against other teams of their group once. The overall standing will still be devised to determine the league winners.

A transfer window was open during a given period in between the first and second rounds

== Clubs ==
11 teams participated in the inaugural season of the league. Kaya withdrew mid-season.

Club / Team	Head coach
Ateneo de Manila University	John Paul Merida
De La Salle University	Hans Smit
Far Eastern University	Marnelli Dimzon
Fuego España	Randolpho Clarino
Green Archers United	Elvin Marcellana
Hiraya	John Philip Dinglasan
Kaya	Steve Nicholls
OutKast	Rhea Penales
The Younghusband Football Academy	Roberto Cabural
University of Santo Tomas	Priscilla Rubio
University of the Philippines	Andres Gonzales

== League table ==
Pos	Team	Pld	W	D	L	GF	GA	GD	Pts
1	De La Salle University (C)	13	13	0	0	59	7	+52	39
2	University of Santo Tomas	13	9	0	4	53	20	+33	27
3	Far Eastern University	13	8	2	3	31	13	+18	26
4	Green Archers United	13	6	1	6	26	24	+2	19
5	Hiraya	13	6	1	6	21	28	−7	19
6	Ateneo de Manila University	13	5	3	5	23	24	−1	18
7	The Younghusband Football Academy	13	5	0	8	21	60	−39	15
8	OutKast	13	4	2	7	26	23	+3	14
9	University of the Philippines	13	4	1	8	15	26	−11	13
10	Fuego España	13	0	0	13	1	51	−50	0

Source: Philippine Football Federation
Rules for classification: No information
(C) Champions

Matches involving Kaya F.C. were annulled.

== Results ==
=== First round ===
Club/Team	ATE	DLS	FEU	FUE	GAU	HYA	OUT	UST	UPD	YFA
Ateneo de Manila University	—	0–6	0–3	2–0	1–1	2–3	2–2	6–1	3–1	0–0
De La Salle University	6–0	—	3–2	6–0	6–1	1–0	3–1	4–1	2–1	2–0
Far Eastern University	3–0	2–3	—	5–0	1–3	0–0	0–0	6–0	4–2	2–1
Fuego España	0–2	0–6	0–5	—	0–5	0–2	0–6	0–2	0–7	0–3
Green Archers United	1–1	1–6	3–1	5–0	—	4–0	0–3	4–0	3–1	1–3
Hiraya	0–3	0–1	0–0	3–0	0–4	—	3–2	2–4	1–5	2–0
OutKast	2–2	1–3	0–0	6–0	3–0	2–3	—	7–0	1–4	2–0
University of Santo Tomas	1–6	1–4	0–6	2–0	0–4	4–2	0–7	—	1–8	4–2
University of the Philippines	1–3	1–2	2–4	7–0	1–3	5–1	4–1	8–1	—	5–2
The Younghusband Football Academy	1–0	0–2	1–2	3–0	3–1	0–2	0–2	2–4	2–5	—

Source: Philippine Football Federation
Legend: Blue = left column team win; Yellow = draw; Red = top row team win.

Kaya F.C. matches

Kaya F.C. withdrew from the league mid-season. They played six matches against six teams before their withdrawal. All results involving Kaya were voided and had no bearing with the overall standing.

Club	FEU	GAU	HYA	OUT	UST	UPD
Kaya	0–4	2–6	0–4	1–7	1–8	0–6

=== Second round ===
The league's second round commenced on October 14, 2017. The ten teams were divided into two groups with each team facing the four other teams in its group once.

Club/Team	ATE	FEU	FUE	UST	UPD
Ateneo de Manila University	—	1–2	4–0	1–7	0–0
Far Eastern University	2–1	—	3–0	0–3	3–0
Fuego España	0–4	0–3	—	1–4	0–2
University of Santo Tomas	7–1	3–0	4–1	—	5–1
University of the Philippines	0–0	0–3	2–0	1–5	—

Source: Philippine Football Federation
Legend: Blue = left column team win; Yellow = draw; Red = top row team win.

Club/Team	DLS	GAU	HYA	OUT	YFA
De La Salle University	—	3–0	4–1	3–0	16–0
Green Archers United	0–3	—	2–3	2–0	0–3 (Note: TYFA won by default.)
Hiraya	1–4	3–2	—	1–3	4–2
OutKast	0–3	0–2	1–3	—	1–3
The Younghusband Football Academy	0–16	3–0 (Note: TYFA won by default.)	2–4	3–1	—

Source: Philippine Football Federation
Legend: Blue = left column team win; Yellow = draw; Red = top row team win.

== Honors ==
Individual awards

- Most Valuable Player: (Philippines) Sara Castañeda (De La Salle)
- Best Goalkeeper: (Philippines) Inna Palacios (De La Salle)
- Best Defender: (Philippines) Ivy Lopez (UST)
- Best Midfielder: (Philippines) Charisa Lemoran (UST)
- Golden Boot: (Philippines) Kyra Dimaandal (De La Salle) with 21 goals

Team

- Fair Play Award: Fuego España F.C.
