= Green Archers United F.C. (women) =

Philippine professional football club

- Full name: Green Archers United Futbol Club
- Dissolved: 2020
- League: PFF Women's League
- 2018: PFFWL, 9th
Home colours

Green Archers United Futbol Club was a Philippine professional football club. The women's team of Green Archers United participated at the PFF Women's League, the top women's football league in the Philippines. Amidst the COVID-19 pandemic in 2020, the club has disbanded.

== Notable players ==
- (Philippines) Marielle Benitez
- (Philippines) Anicka Castañeda
- (Philippines) Alisha del Campo

== Honors ==
- WFL Ladies Division

- Runners-up (2): 2012–13, 2013–14

- UFL Youth League U17 Girls

- Winner (2): 2014, 2015

== Officials ==
As of 3 December 2016

Position	Name	Nationality
Head coach	Elvin Marcellana	Philippines
