= FEU Lady Tamaraw Booters football =

FEU Lady Tamaraw Booters
- Full name: Far Eastern University women's football team
- Nicknames: FEU Lady Tamaraws; FEU Lady Tamaraw Booters
- Owner: Far Eastern University
- League: UAAP; PFF Women's League; PFF Women's Cup
- 2026–27 2023 2022: 1st (UAAP); 2nd (PFF Women's League); Champions (PFF Women's Cup)

The FEU Lady Tamaraw Booters are the varsity women's football team of the Far Eastern University. They compete at the University Athletic Association of the Philippines (UAAP), as well as at the PFF Women's League, the top flight domestic women's football league in the Philippines.

== Background ==
The FEU Lady Tamaraw Booters are among the teams in the inaugural edition (Season 58) of the women's division of the UAAP Football Championships in 1995–96.

By winning Season 76 of UAAP in 2014 which is their ninth title, the FEU Lady Tamaraws became the collegiate team in the UAAP to have the most titles in women's football. They added to the then-record by winning again in Season 77. As of Season 89 they are the team with the most UAAP women's football title with 15 championships. They are also the first team to attain five consecutive title streak, accomlishing the feat in Season 89.

They have also won the PFF Women's Cup thrice. They won during the inaugural season in 2014, their second one the following season in 2015, and their third and latest title in 2022.

== Honors ==
UAAP Football Championship

- Champions (15): 1996–97, 1997–98, 2000–01, 2001–02, 2006–07, 2007–08, 2010–11, 2012–13, 2013–14, 2014–15, 2022–23, 2023–24, 2024–25, 2025–26, 2026–27

PFF Women's Cup

- Champions (3): 2014 (9-a-side), 2015, 2022

PFF Women's League

- Runners-up (2): 2019–20, 2023

== See also ==
- FEU Tamaraws
