= Ateneo Blue Eagles women's football =

Ateneo Blue Eagles
- Full name: Ateneo Lady Blue Booters
- Ground: Moro Lorenzo Football Field
- Owner: Ateneo de Manila University
- Head coach: John Paul Merida
- League: PFF Women's League; UAAP
- 2018 2017–18: 6th (PFFWL); 4th (UAAP)

The Ateneo Blue Eagles (formerly Ateneo Lady Blue Booters) is the varsity women's football team of the Ateneo de Manila University. They compete at the University Athletic Association of the Philippines (UAAP). They also played in PFF Women's League, the top flight domestic women's football league in the Philippines.

== 2016 quad ==
Note: Flags indicate national team as defined under FIFA eligibility rules; some limited exceptions apply. Players may hold more than one non-FIFA nationality.

No.	Pos.	Nation	Player
1	GK	PHI	Marie Rianne Caparros
2	GK	PHI	Jana Gabrielle Morales
3	DF	PHI	Pauline Isabel Aurora Villaflor
4	DF	PHI	Hannah Sofia Khio
5	DF	PHI	Annika Gabrielle Ong
6	DF	PHI	Isabella Sabio
7	FW	PHI	Camille Rodriguez (captain)
8	MF	PHI	Antonette Amoncio
9	MF	PHI	Ma. Pamela Denise Diaz
10	DF	PHI	Ann Catherine Cabrera
11	DF	PHI	Maria Ysabel Ramos
12	MF	PHI	Nina Noel Catedrilla

No.	Pos.	Nation	Player
13	MF	PHI	Mia Angela Catedrilla
14	MF	PHI	Madeline Georgia Cotoco
15	MF	PHI	Gabby Therese Esguerra
16	DF	PHI	Mica Isabel Corrales
17	MF	PHI	Maria Teresa Bernardo
18	MF	PHI	Maria Beatrice Isobel Velasco
19	FW	PHI	Tiffany Veronica Siy
22	MF	PHI	Precious Joy Capistrano
24	GK	PHI	Eva Katherine Montelibano
28	DF	PHI	Nicola Andrea Roxas
29	MF	PHI	Hannah Bianca Herrera

== Officials ==
As of 3 December 2016

Position	Name	Nationality
Head coach	John Paul Merida	Philippines
Assistant coach	Marigen Ariel	Philippines
Team manager	Robert Manlulo	Philippines
