= PFF Women's League =

- Founded: 2016; 10 years ago
- First season: 2016–17
- Country: Philippines
- Confederation: AFC
- Divisions: 1
- Number of clubs: 4
- Level on pyramid: 1
- Domestic cup: PFF Women's Cup
- International cup: AFC Women's Champions League
- Current champions: Kaya–Iloilo (3rd title)
- Most championships: Kaya–Iloilo; De La Salle University (3 titles each)
- Broadcaster(s): Pilipinas Live
- Website: pff.org.ph
- Current: 2026 PFF Women's League

The PFF Women's League (PFFWL) is the top-flight of women's association football in the Philippines.

The league was launched by the Philippine Football Federation (PFF) in 2014, with its first season held from 2016 to 2017. It has featured various women's teams including bona fide clubs and university teams.

== History ==
To follow up with the PFF Women's Cup which was launched in 2014, the PFF Women's League was launched on November 5, 2016, by the Philippine Football Federation (PFF). The competition became the first to follow a league format following the folding of the Pinay Futbol League in 2013 and became the first women's domestic league in the country. The league sanctioned by PFF as an amateur league as part of FIFA's Women's Development Project for the Philippines. Prior to the league's establishment, the primary competition for women's football in the Philippines was the University Athletic Association of the Philippines (UAAP).

Most of the teams that are participating at the inaugural 2016–17 season were either from the UAAP or alumni teams. The PFF plans to hold a bigger amateur women's league to give more playing opportunities to collegiate players after they graduate from their respective universities and eventually professionalize the league so it can support itself. The league was launched to create a bigger pool for the Philippines women's national football team. De La Salle University were the champions of the inaugural season.

The PFF announced in July 2018 that a second season for the PFF Women's League will take place. The second season followed a single round robin format instead of multiple round robin format used for the inaugural season. This run was contested from August to November 2018. The league's players reportedly are compliant with the MyPFF online registration system of the Philippine Football Federation. De La Salle retained the league title.

The league has not been held since 2020 due to the COVID-19 pandemic. A new season for the league was planned to be held from November to December 2022 with eight teams. The PFF later clarified that it would be holding the PFF Women's Cup.

There is also a plan to rebrand and reorganize the PFF Women's League to a commercial league after the 2023 FIFA Women's World Cup.

The fourth season of the league was launched in June 2023. The league secured a major sponsor, Coca-Cola in July 2023.

In July 2024, there was plans to have two divisions were disclosed. The 2025 season commenced at the Mall of Asia Football Pitch in Pasay on March 22, 2025. The 2026 season returned in July 2026 with four teams namely Kaya–Iloilo, De La Salle University, Far Eastern University, and the University of the Philippines with matches also held in the same venue.

== Teams ==
11 teams entered in the inaugural edition. At least for the inaugural edition, participating teams paid a registration fee of ₱15 thousand. Kaya withdrew mid-season. In the 2018 season, there were 10 teams with two being the new additional. The succeeding season retained a 10 team roster, with three teams from the previous season deciding not to enter. Three teams would not play again but Manila Digger would join for the 2023 season. 2022 PFF Women's Cup debutants Azzurri also joins the league.

2026 PFF Women's League teams
Team	Position in 2025	First season	Number of seasons
Kaya–Iloilo	1st	2016–17	4
De La Salle University	—N/a	2016–17	5
Far Eastern University	—N/a	2016–17	5
University of the Philippines	6th	2016–17	6

Former teams
Team	First season	Last season	Number of seasons
Azzurri	2023		1
Ateneo de Manila University	2016–17	2018	2
Capital1 Solar Strikers	2025		1
De La Salle Zobel	2018		1
Fuego España	2016–17		1
Green Archers United	2016–17	2019–20	3
Hiraya	2016–17	2019–20	2' (Note: Stallion Laguna joined as Stallion–Hiraya for the 2019–20 season under partnership with Hiraya which joined themselves in 2016–17)
Makati	2025		1
Manila Digger	2023		1
Manila Nomads	2019–20	2023	2
Maroons	2019–20		1
Stallion–Laguna	2019–20	2025	3
Tigers	2019–20		1
Tuloy	2018	2023	3
OutKast	2016–17	2018	2
University of Santo Tomas	2016–17	2025	5
The Younghusband Football Academy	2016–17		1

== Champions ==
Season	Champions	Runners-up	No.
2016–17	De La Salle University	University of Santo Tomas	~~10~~ 9
2018	De La Salle University	University of Santo Tomas	10
2019–20	De La Salle University	Far Eastern University	10
2020	Not held due to the COVID-19 pandemic		
2021	Not held due to the COVID-19 pandemic		
2023	Kaya–Iloilo	Manila Digger	10
2025	Kaya–Iloilo	Stallion Laguna	6
2026	Kaya–Iloilo	Far Eastern University	4

== Individual awards ==
Most Valuable Player

Year	Player	Team
2016–17	(Philippines) Sara Castañeda	De La Salle University
2018	(Philippines) Chelo Hodges	De La Salle University
2019–20	(Philippines) Anna Delos Reyes	De La Salle University
2023	(Philippines) Shelah Cadag	Kaya–Iloilo
2025	(Philippines) Hali Long	Kaya–Iloilo
2026	(Philippines) Alessandrea Carpio	Kaya–Iloilo

Best Goalkeeper/Golden Glove

Year	Player	Team
2016–17	(Philippines) Inna Palacios	De La Salle University
2018	(Philippines) Natasha Lacson	De La Salle University
2019–20	(Philippines) Kimberly Pariña	Far Eastern University
2023	(Ghana) Ayishatu Simpson	Manila Digger
2025		
2026	(Philippines) Jessa Lehayan	Far Eastern University

Best Defender

Year	Player	Team
2016–17	(Philippines) Ivy Lopez	University of Santo Tomas
2018	(Philippines) Mariell Tejada	De La Salle University
2019–20	(Philippines) Glyness Dela Cruz	De La Salle University
2023	(Philippines) Jonella Albino	Far Eastern University
2025		
2026	(Japan) Saki Yoshida	Kaya–Iloilo

Best Midfielder

Year	Player	Team
2016–17	(Philippines) Charisa Lemoran	University of Santo Tomas
2018	(Philippines) Hazel Lustan	University of Santo Tomas
2019–20	(Philippines) Shelah Cadag	University of Santo Tomas
2023	(Philippines) Charisa Lemoran (2)	Kaya–Iloilo
2025		
2026	(Philippines) Sarahgen Tulabing	Far Eastern University

Golden Boot

Year	Player	Goals	Team
2016–17	(Philippines) Kyra Dimaandal	21	De La Salle University
2018	(Philippines) Isabella Bandoja	24	Tuloy
2019–20	(Philippines) Isabella Bandoja (2)	30	Tuloy
2023	(Philippines) Isabella Bandoja (3)	19	Tuloy
2023	(Philippines) Angelica Teves	19	De La Salle University
2025	(Mexico) Julissa Cisneros	13	Kaya–Iloilo
2026	(Philippines) Dionesa Tolentin	8	Kaya–Iloilo

== Sponsorship ==
Major sponsors

Company	Period	Ref.
Coca-Cola Philippines	2023–present	
