= De La Salle Lady Booters football =

Women's football team of De La Salle University

De La Salle Lady Booters
- Full name: De La Salle University Women's Football Team
- Nickname: Lady Booters
- Owner: De La Salle University
- Head coach: Hans Smit
- League: UAAP; PFFWL
- 2023–24 2023: 2nd (UAAP); 4th (PFFWL)
Home colours	Away colours

The De La Salle Lady Booters are the varsity women's football team of the De La Salle University. They compete at the University Athletic Association of the Philippines (UAAP), as well as at the PFF Women's League (PFFWL), the top flight domestic women's football league in the Philippines.

== UAAP ==
The DLSU Lady Booters have won 11 titles in the UAAP. They hold the record of having the longest championship streak, winning four straight titles from UAAP Season 65 to 68 (2002–2005). They have also won three straight titles from UAAP Season 79 to 81 (2017–2019).

== PFFWL ==
The collegiate squad was among the pioneer teams of the first season of the PFF Women's League which ran from 2016 to 2017. De La Salle was assured of the league title of the 2016–17 season after their first second round match against OutKast which ended in a 3–0 win. They were undefeated in that season garnering 13 wins or 39 points.

De La Salle won the second league title in 2018 winning 2–1 over the University of Santo Tomas in the de facto final. The Lady Booters also won the third league title in 2020 against UST, completing their third consecutive championship.

== Officials ==
Position	Name	Nationality
Head coach	Hans-Peter Smit	Philippines
Assistant coach	Alvin Ocampo	Philippines
Team manager	Genaro de Vera	Philippines

== Honors ==
UAAP Football Championship

- Champions (11): 1995–96, 1998–99, 1999–00, 2002–03, 2003–04, 2004–05, 2005–06, 2009–10, 2016–17, 2017–18, 2018–19

PFF Women's League

- Champions (3): 2016–17, 2018, 2019–20

PFF Women's Cup

- Runners-up (1): 2015

== See also ==
- De La Salle University
  - De La Salle Green Archers and Lady Archers
    - De La Salle Green Archers basketball
    - De La Salle Green Spikers volleyball
    - De La Salle Lady Spikers volleyball
