= UST Lady Booters football =

Represents the University of Santo Tomas

UST Lady Booters
- Full name: University of Santo Tomas women's football team
- Nicknames: UST Lady Booters; UST Growling Tigers
- Founded: 1995
- Ground: Manila
- Head coach: Marjo Allado (3rd season)
- League: UAAP; PFF Women's League
- 2026 2025: 5th (UAAP); 5th (PFF)
Home colours	Away colours

The UST Lady Booters (Note: The collegiate athletic teams of the University of Santo Tomas are collectively known as the UST Growling Tigers) team represents the University of Santo Tomas in the University Athletic Association of the Philippines (UAAP) football tournament. UST has made 11 Finals appearances and won two championships since the women's football tournament began in the league in 1995. Their head coach as of July 2024 is current Golden Booters coach Marjo Allado.

UST also participates in the PFF Women's League and the UNIGAMES during summer and the offseason months.

== History ==
=== Inaugural season ===
The UST Lady Booters joined the inaugural five-team UAAP Women's football tournament that began on November 30, 1995. They lost their opening match against UP, 1–2 with L. Cruz scoring the goal for UST. They got back at UP by winning, 1–0 in their second round match on January 17, 1996, through Mary Ann Manzano's goal. The other UST players who scored in the season were Siegfried Rockwell and Jonalyn Evangelista.

=== Seasons under Talavera and Bejemino ===
The team had respectable finishes in their first two years, but had fallen to fifth and last in the standings in 1997. Former UST Golden Booter Gil Talavera was then appointed head coach in 1998, however, he was unsuccessful in his first year of handling the team when they fell again to fifth place for the second straight year. It was a big turnaround for the Lady Booters the following year when he was able to steer UST to the Finals in Season 62. The Lady Booters reached the Finals again in Season 65 but fell short against La Salle for the second time, surrendering a wide margin of 1–5. Joyce Landagan scored the lone goal for the Lady Booters to prevent a shutout by the eventual champions.

Talavera resigned at the end of Season 66 after another third-place finish by the Lady Booters and was replaced by his long-time assistant Jade Bejemino, who was also a former Lady Booter. Moving on from the team with the former coach were their leading scorers, Alelie Bonifacio who has used up her five-year playing eligibility; and Landagan who was left out of the roster due to academic deficiencies.

In Bejemino's first year as coach, the team struggled in the first round with only a single win against two draws and a loss. That win came in their opening match of the season against Ateneo's Lady Blue Guards. Julie Ann Gerona scored a goal to add to two others made by rookie Dorelyn Mendaza for a 3–0 finish. They were able to catch up in the next round to duplicate Season 66's third-place finish with four wins against two draws and two losses.

The Lady Booters made a return trip to the Finals in Season 68, but lost yet again to La Salle, 1–2. Mary Ignacio won the Rookie of the Year award for the season.

With La Salle's suspension in Season 69 and having to contend with only three other teams, UST reached the Finals again but became unsuccessful yet again when they lost the title to FEU. They have had four attempts so far in claiming the championship and all of them have resulted to runner-up finishes.

The following year gave the Lady Booters an auspicious start, having finally won the UNIGAMES and the Metro Manila Girls Football Association crowns in the offseason. The best finish that they got before in the MMGFA was third beginning in 2001, and they had back-to-back second-place finishes in the UNIGAMES in 2003 and 2004. They were also runners-up in the inaugural Ang Liga Filipina tournament in 2006. They ended their UAAP Season 70 campaign at third place with four wins against two draws and two losses.

=== Seasons under Estrabon ===
Bejemino stepped down in 2008 and was replaced by Bon Estrabon who went on to lead the team to their first UAAP women's football title in Season 71. UST defeated La Salle on a 4–1 penalty shootout after both teams were tied, 1–1 at the end of regulation. The Lady Booters were actually behind on points until Aiza Mondero made the equalizer at the 75th minute. In overtime, UST's Shiralyn Francisco and Jovelyn Artillaga's penalty kicks went through Hannah Ibarra's guard. La Salle's Karla Pacificador's shot went in next, but misfires from Clarissa Lazaro and Samantha Nierras kept the score at 2–1. Two more successful goals by team captain Aprilyn Reyes and Joma Clemente sealed the win for UST. Mary Ignacio was named MVP of the season, while Marianne Narciso won the Rookie of the year award. Louella Amamuyo was named Best defender and Irish Rapal got the Best goalkeeper award.

The Lady Booters once again won the UNIGAMES in 2009 to add to their MMGFA title which they also won that year where they defeated La Salle in both matches. The two teams met again in Season 72's football Finals with La Salle holding a twice-to-beat advantage. UST won, 2–0, both on Marianne Narciso's goals to extend the series. They then lost in the second match, 0–1 when Nikki Regalado failed to score at the end of regulation. Narciso, who was also held scoreless by their opponents, received the Best striker award with a season-high total of nine goals scored in the tournament. Arlene Gavile was named Best goalkeeper of the season.

After a back-to-back Finals affair with La Salle, the Lady Booters once again faced FEU after topping the eliminations with a 5–1–2 win–draw–loss record. While expecting to have a twice-to-beat advantage over their opponents, the UAAP board decided to make the championship into a best-of-three series. FEU won the first match on a 2–0 penalty shootout, but UST made a comeback with a 1–0 win to extend the series. Jowe-Ann Barruga converted a successful header from a corner shot in the 15th minute. FEU had a chance to equalize in the second half when a UST defender was called for a handball violation, but Kristia Sabanal missed the penalty when her shot bounced off the post. Coach Estrabon's team was not as successful in the third and deciding match after they yielded the championship on a 0–1 loss to FEU. Zipporah Luna, the Lady Booters' goalkeeper could not stop FEU's Frea Fado from scoring early in the 16th minute, however, Luna still won the Best goalkeeper award for the season. Marianne Narciso was again named Best striker with four goals scored in the season, and Pearl Anjanette Aguilar was given the Rookie of the year award.

UST won the title again in Season 74 over La Salle, who had returned to the Finals after getting eliminated the past year. The Lady Booters, for their part, were coming off back-to-back Finals losses to La Salle in Season 72; and to FEU last season. Jowe-Ann Barruga scored a goal in the 67th minute for the 1–0 win in the deciding match against La Salle. Teammate Christine Fuertes made the pass for the title-clinching goal. Barruga played on after incurring a cut on her head from a collision with La Salle defender Celine Ampil. The Lady Booters held a twice-to-beat advantage, but their opponents forced a deciding game with a 4–3 penalty shootout win. This was Estrabon's as well as UST's second championship in the UAAP since the sports debuted in 1995. Marice Magdolot was named MVP and Marianne Narciso won the Best striker award for the third straight year. Aiza Mondero also won an award as the Best midfielder of the season.

The Lady Booters failed to qualify to the Finals in Season 75. They lost to FEU, 0–1 in the second round for a third-place finish in the standings with three wins, two draws and three losses.

=== Seasons under Judal ===
JR Judal replaced Bon Estrabon as coach in August 2013. In his first year, the new mentor emphasized ball passing as key to the team's offense. The Lady Booters began Season 76 on a goalless draw with Ateneo, with Judal attributing the outcome to inexperience by the team's many rookies. UST went on to top the eliminations at first place with three wins, four draws and one loss in the standings. Having a twice-to-beat advantage in the Finals, they bowed down twice to FEU with 0–1 and 1–2 losses. Marice Magdolot made the lone goal in the second match on the 89th minute, while still trailing their opponents by 1. Jena Abuan was named Best defender while Zipporah Luna again won the Best goalkeeper award.

=== Seasons under Rubio ===
From being runners-up in Season 76, the Lady Booters struggled and ended last in the standings with a 2–0–6 win–draw–loss record. Aging Rubio who was a player on UST's 2008 champion team replaced JR Judal as coach after only two seasons. The 2014 team was disbanded after Judal's resignation. Rubio's first official coaching assignment came in the offseason when UST joined the 2015 PFF Women's Cup. She was the coach of Saint Pedro Poveda College, as well as UST's men and women's futsal team prior to her appointment as the Lady Booters' head coach.

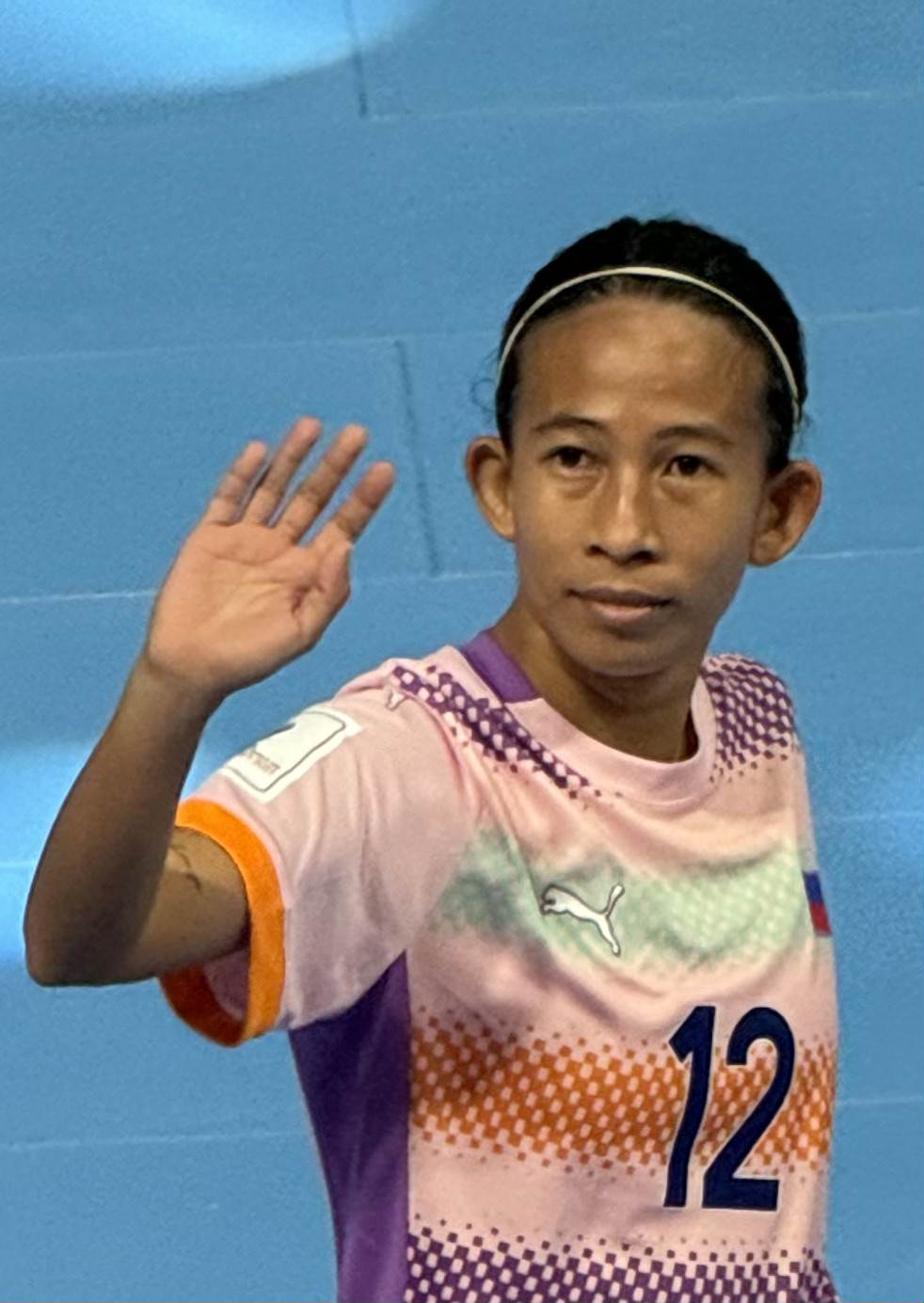
Charisa Lemoran

The Lady Booters began their Season 78 campaign with a loss to La Salle, 3–5. Charisa Lemoran, Jennizel Cabalan and Niña Acuña scored each of the goals. They ended up fifth and last in the standings for the second straight year with a 1–1–6 W–D–L record. Their lone win came in the first round when they defeated FEU, 3–2. Lemoran scored two goals and Cabalan added one. They also held FEU to a scoreless draw in the second round. Former team captain Chanda Solite was named to the Mythical team during the awarding ceremonies.

In Season 79, UST was once again in the Finals following two consecutive disappointing seasons. They defeated Ateneo, 5–4 in a playoff match to determine La Salle's Finals opponent. Their first round match against Ateneo ended in a 2–2 draw where they twice came back from a 0–1 and 1–2 deficit. They fell short of the title after yielding a 1–3 loss to La Salle, but four of their players ended up bagging awards with Charisa Lemoran, Aira Ilan, and Hazel Lustan being named to the Mythical team and Mary Joy Indac winning the Rookie of the year award. Lustan made the lone goal in the match from a six-yard kick in the 73rd minute of the match.

The Lady Booters were the first to reach the Finals in Season 80 when they defeated defending champions La Salle, 5–2. Charisa Lemoran and Shelah Cadag scored two goals apiece with Mary Joy Indac adding a fifth for the match. They also won in the first round on a 1–0 score. La Salle still made it to the Finals and defeated UST for the second straight year. The match ended in a 1–2 score with Shelah Cadag making the lone goal in the 22nd minute. Shelah Cadag was named Best striker of the season and UST was given the Fair Play award.

In Season 81, UST lost to UP, 0–1 and were eliminated from the Finals. The Lady Booters ended the season in third place with a 6–1–1 W–D–L record. UP finished with a lower rank due to an inferior goal difference.

The football games for the senior men and women's tournament in Season 82 were cancelled due to the COVID-19 pandemic. The Lady Booters played only one game in a 0–1 losing effort to UP. Carmela Sacdalan, who replaced the already-graduated Nicole Reyes as the team's goalkeeper, failed to stop the penalty goal from UP's Stacey Arthur in the 35th minute.

The Lady Booters returned to the pitch after two years when they joined the PFF Women's Cup on November 6, 2022. They ended the tournament at fifth place after seven matches, defeating UAAP rivals FEU and Ateneo, as well as getting a big win against Stallion FC, with a 9–0 score. They, however ended up goalless and got dominated in their losses to UP and Kaya FC. Lovely Fernandez topscored for the team, with four goals in two matches.

UST ended UAAP's Season 85 tournament ranked fourth out of the five-team field with three wins against four losses and a draw. They won over eventual finalists, the De La Salle Lady Booters in their first round match with a hattrick by Fernandez, but were dominated, 0–7 in the second round. UST was still in the running for the championship when they defeated Ateneo, but a 0–2 loss against UP ended their chances as they ended up fourth in ranking at the end of the season. Nathalie Absalon topscored for the team with four goals in three matches, as Fernandez converted with three during two of the Lady Booters' victories.

UST's Season 86 campaign marked the team's worst showing, when they placed fifth and last in the standings with a 1–7–0 win–loss–draw record. It was only slightly better than their 2016 season during Coach Aging Rubio's first year with the Lady Booters, where they also finished last, winning also only a single match against a draw and six defeats.

Rubio attributed this year's performance to the absence of their already-graduated veterans, after the pandemic put hold on the games for two years and prevented them from recruiting during that period. Another factor that the long-tine coach cited was their lack of training, which was caused by the ongoing reconstruction of the UST Open Field.

Gleydile Añonuevo topscored for the team with two goals in two matches, out of the total six goals that the team scored throughout the season.

Earlier in the 2023 PFF Women's League, the Lady Booters ended up at eighth place in the ten-team tournament, after beating Stallion FC, 5–2 on a 2–6–1 win–loss–draw record. Stephannie Logastua topscored for the team with four goals in three matches, with Samantha Asilo scoring three in the same number of games.

=== Seasons under Allado ===
Long-time Golden Booters head coach Marjo Allado replaced Aging Rubio in July 2024. Rubio was eased out following a controversy involving player allowances. Allado's appointment to the team posed some challenges, with the football tournament set to begin in the first semester of the school year and leaving them little time to adjust and prepare under a new coaching system. The change in the tournament's schedule was brought about by the extreme hot weather condition that they experienced earlier in the year, in the concluded previous season.

The Lady Booters struggled in the first round, losing their first three games at the start of the season, and earning only their first point at the end of the round, after securing a draw against UP. UST's Judy Prado scored a goal in the 57th minute for the equalizer, from being down, 0–1 since the 35th minute. The team made a turnaround in the second round, first, by securing a draw against second-running La Salle, and then blanking Ateneo, 3–0. They were in the running for a Finals appearance, until they lost to FEU, 0–2. The Lady Booters closed out the tournament with a 2–0 win over UP, clinching for themselves a podium finish at third place with two wins against four losses and two draws. Christy Logastua topscored for the team with three goals, in two matches. Prado and Añonuevo each scored two goals in the same number of matches.

=== Succession of team captains ===
No.	Player	Year
1	Alelie Bonifacio	2001–02
2	Julie Gerona	2004
3	Aprilyn Reyes	2008
4	Aiza Mondero	2011
5	Nikki Regalado	2012
6	Chanda Solite	2013
7	Zipporah Luna	2016
8	Aira Ilan	2017
9	Hazel Lustan	2018
10	Shelah Cadag	2019
11	Carmela Sacdalan	2020
12	Jerelyn Danao	2023
13	Cindy Bennett	2024
14	Bianca Sy	2024–25 (Note: Tournament shifted back to the first semester of the following academic year)
15	Rica Gerona	2026–present

=== Succession of head coaches ===
No.	Name	Tenure
1	Noel Casilao	1995–1997
2	Gil Talavera	1998–2003
3	Jade Bejemino	2003–2008
4	Rozano (Bon) Estrabon	2008–2013
5	Sorito (JR) Judal, Jr.	2013–2015
6	Prescila (Aging) Rubio	2015–2024
7	Marjo Allado	2024–present

== Year-by-year results ==
=== UAAP record ===
Year	Season	Eliminations							Finals		Top goalscorer(s)		Coach
Year	Season	Rank	Pld.	W	D	L	GD	Pts	Opponent	Result	Player	Goals	Coach
1995	58 (Note: The inaugural women's football tournament began in 1995)	3rd	8	3	1	3		10	Did not qualify				Noel Casilao
1996	59	4th	8	1	1	2			Did not qualify				Noel Casilao
1997	60	5th	8						Did not qualify				Noel Casilao
1998	61	5th	8						Did not qualify				Gil Talavera
1999	62	2nd	8						DLSU Lady Booters	Runner-up			Gil Talavera
2000	63	3rd	8	2	3	3	-1	9	Did not qualify		Joyce Landagan	4	Gil Talavera
2001	64	4th	8	2	2	4	0	8	Did not qualify		Alelie Bonifacio	4	Gil Talavera
2002	65	2nd	8	5	2	1		17	DLSU Lady Booters	Runner-up	Alelie Bonifacio	6	Gil Talavera
2003	66	3rd	8	1	5	2	0	8	Did not qualify		Dorelyn Mendaza	2	Jade Bejemino
2004	67	3rd	8	2	3	3		9	Did not qualify				Jade Bejemino
2005	68	2nd	8	3	3	2		12	DLSU Lady Booters	Runner-up			Jade Bejemino
2006	69	2nd	6	1	3	1		6	FEU Lady Tamaraw Booters	Runner-up			Jade Bejemino
2007	70	3rd	8	4	2	2	+6	14	Did not qualify				Jade Bejemino
2008	71	2nd	8	5	2	1	+9	17	DLSU Lady Booters	Champion			Bon Estrabon
2009	72	2nd	8						DLSU Lady Booters	Runner-up	Marianne Narciso		Bon Estrabon
2010	73	1st	8	5	1	2	+2	16	FEU Lady Tamaraw Booters	Runner-up	Marianne Narciso		Bon Estrabon
2011	74	1st	8	4	2	2	+7	14	DLSU Lady Booters	Champion	Marianne Narciso		Bon Estrabon
2012	75	3rd	8	3	2	3	+1	11	Did not qualify				Bon Estrabon
2013	76	1st	8	3	4	1	+3	13	FEU Lady Tamaraw Booters	Runner-up			JR Judal
2014	77	5th	8	2	0	6	-8	6	Did not qualify		Jennizel Cabalan	2	JR Judal
2016 (Note: Tournament shifted from November to February of the following year)	78	5th	8	1	1	6	-14	4	Did not qualify		Jennizel Cabalan; Charisa Lemoran	3	Aging Rubio
2017	79	2nd (Note: Defeated Ateneo, 5–4 in playoff for #2 seed)	8	4	1	3	-2	13	DLSU Lady Booters	Runner-up	Charisa Lemoran	11	Aging Rubio
2018	80	1st	8	6	1	1	+12	19	DLSU Lady Booters	Runner-up	Shelah Cadag	8	Aging Rubio
2019	81	3rd	8	2	3	3	-7	9	Did not qualify		Hazel Lustan	4	Aging Rubio
2020	82	3rd	1	0	0	1	-1	0	Tournament cancelled (Note: Tournament cancelled due to the COVID-19 pandemic; Football excluded from overall championship tally)				Aging Rubio
2021	83	Tournament cancelled											Aging Rubio
2022	84	Tournament cancelled											Aging Rubio
2023	85	4th	8	3	1	4	-10	10	Did not qualify		Nathalie Absalon	4	Aging Rubio
2024	86	5th	8	1	0	7	-12	3	Did not qualify		Gleydile Añonuevo	2	Aging Rubio
2024	87	3rd	8	2	2	4	-1	8	Did not qualify		Christy Logastua	3	Marjo Allado
2025	88	4th	8	2	3	3	-2	9	Did not qualify		Christy Logastua	2	Marjo Allado
2026	89	5th	10	3	2	5	0	11	Did not qualify		Rica Gerona	3	Marjo Allado

=== Offseason record ===
Year	Tournament	Season	Rank	Pld.	W	D	L	GD	Pts	Top goalscorer(s)	Goals	Coach
2014	PFF Women's Cup	1	–	2	2	0	0	+10	6	Kate Aguilar	2	JR Judal
2015	PFF Women's Cup	2	4th (Note: The Lady Booters lost in the semifinal match against FEU and the third place match against Ateneo)	6	3	1	2	0	10	Charisa Lemoran	4	Aging Rubio
2016	PFF Women's League	1	2nd	13	9	0	4	+33	27	Charisa Lemoran	15	Aging Rubio
2018	PFF Women's League	2	2nd	9	7	0	2	+37	21	Shelah Cadag	21	Aging Rubio
2019	PFF Women's League	3	3rd	18	13	1	4	+46	40	Nathalie Absalon	14	Aging Rubio
2022	PFF Women's Cup	3	5th	7	3	1	3	+3	10	Lovely Fernandez	4	Aging Rubio
2023	PFF Women's League	4	8th	9	2	1	6	−10	7	Samantha Asilo; Stephannie Logastua	3	Aging Rubio
2024	United Women's Invitational	1	8th	5	0	1	4	-15	1	Rica Gerona; Gleydile Añonuevo; Jannah Santerva	2	Marjo Allado
2025	PFF Women's League	5	5th	10	1	0	9	-43	3	Stephannie Logastua	3	Marjo Allado

== Results and fixtures ==
UAAP Season 89 (2026) tournament
No.	Date	Time	Venue	Opponent	Result	Goals
1	Sep 23	4:30 pm PHT	UP Football Field	Ateneo Blue Eagles	0–1	–
2	Sep 26	2:00 pm PHT	UP Football Field	NU Lady Bulldogs	3–0	Stephannie Logastua 3'; Joyce Gemberva 34'; Rojana Nemenzo 44'
3	Sep 30	7:00 pm PHT	UP Football Field	FEU Lady Tamaraw Booters	0–1	–
4	Oct 3	4:30 pm PHT	UP Football Field	De La Salle Lady Booters	2–3	Rodina Martinez 30'; Rica Gerona 78'
5	Oct 7	2:00 pm PHT	UP Football Field	UP Fighting Maroons	0–1	–
6	Oct 14	2:00 pm PHT	UP Football Field	De La Salle Lady Booters	1–1	Princess Amilhamja 67'
7	Oct 17	4:30 pm PHT	UP Football Field	FEU Lady Tamaraw Booters	1–5	Rica Gerona 67'
8	Oct 21	4:30 pm PHT	UP Football Field	Ateneo Blue Eagles	1–1	Joyce Gemberva 11'
9	Oct 24	7:00 pm PHT	UP Football Field	NU Lady Bulldogs	3–0	Rica Gerona 24'; Rojana Nemenzo 62'; Pia Jumamoy 71'
10	Oct 28	2:00 pm PHT	UP Football Field	UP Fighting Maroons	2–0	Alannis Hodge 65'; Gleydile Añonuevo 78'

== Players and staff ==
=== Squad ===
As of 23 Sep 2026

Note: Flags indicate national team as defined under FIFA eligibility rules; some limited exceptions apply. Players may hold more than one non-FIFA nationality.

No.	Pos.	Nation	Player
1	GK	PHI	Lizlie Garcia
2	DF	PHI	Ruth Anne Bullanday
3	DF	PHI	Ivy Tapiz
5	DF	PHI	Ma. Rica Juliana Gerona (captain)
6	DF	PHI	Jillian Jalnaiz
7	MF	PHI	Erich Jelou Montejo
8	FW	PHI	Stephannie Ann Logastua
9	DF	PHI	Jannah Marie Santerva
10	DF	PHI	Alannis Sophia Hodge
11	MF	PHI	Princess Annika Amilhamja
12	FW	PHI	Gleydile Añonuevo

No.	Pos.	Nation	Player
13	MF	PHI	Karylle Georgette Pinili
14	DF	PHI	Winceyette Louise Tumala
15	DF	PHI	Zira Gem Baang
16	MF	PHI	Joyce Gemberva
17	MF	PHI	Rojana Nemenzo
19	DF	PHI	Mecha Elah Shane Ursal
23	DF	PHI	Alliyah Basman
22	GK	PHI	Ilah Maries Adolfo
25	MF	PHI	Christy Logastua
26	MF	PHI	Pia Isabel Jumamoy
28	FW	PHI	Rodina Francheska Martinez

=== Coaching staff ===
Position	Name
Head coach	(Philippines) Marjo Allado
Assistant coach	(Philippines) Hazel Lustan
Team manager	

== Notable players ==
=== National team appearances ===
- Alelie Bonifacio

2001 Southeast Asian Games

- Mary Katherine de Villa

2001 Southeast Asian Games

- Joyce Landagan

2001, 2003 Southeast Asian Games

- Diana Rose Redondo

2004 AFC U-19 Championship

- Dorelyn Mendaza

2004 AFC U-19 Championship
2011 AFF Women's Championship

- Prescila Rubio

2011 AFF Women's Championship

- Nikki Regalado

2011, 2012 AFF Women's Championships

- Jane Mariz Pacaña

2011, 2012 AFF Women's Championships

- Zipporah Luna

2011, 2012 AFF Women's Championships

- Joma Clemente

2011, 2012 AFF Women's Championships

- Jowe-Ann Barruga

2011, 2012 AFF Women's Championships

- Pearl Anjanette Aguilar

2011 AFC U-19 Women's Championship
2013, 2015 AFF Women's Championships

- Aiza Mondero

2011, 2015 AFF Women's Championships
2012 AFF Women's Championship (captain)
2013 Southeast Asian Games

- Marie Magdolot

2012 AFF Women's Championship

- Marianne Narciso

2013, 2015 AFF Women's Championships

- Marice Magdolot

2012, 2013, 2015 AFF Women's Championships

- Jennizel Cabalan

2013, 2015, 2016 AFF Women's Championships

- Rachel Hope Sanchez

2015 AFF Women's Championship

- Charisa Marie Lemoran

2017, 2019 Southeast Asian Games
2018, 2019 AFF Women's Championships
2025 ASEAN Women's Championship

- Nicole Julliane Reyes

2018 AFF Women's Championship

- Hazel Lustan

2019 Southeast Asian Games
2019 AFF Women's Championship

- Shelah Mae Cadag

2019 Southeast Asian Games
2020 AFC Women's Olympic Qualifying

== Honors ==
=== Team ===
- UAAP

Champions:
- 2008
- 2011
Runners-up:
- 1999
- 2002
- 2005
- 2006
- 2009
- 2010
- 2013
- 2017
- 2018
Fair Play award: 2018

- PFF Women's League

Runners-up:
- 2016
- 2018

- UNIGAMES

Champions:
- 2007
- 2009
Runners-up:
- 2003
- 2004
- 2006
- 2011
- 2013

- Metro Manila Girls Football Association

Champions:
- 2001
- 2007
- 2009

- Rexona Cup

Champions:
- 2009
- 2010

- PFL Ang Liga Filipina

Champions: 2013
Runners-up: 2006

- Pinay in Action (PIA) Cup

Champions: 2018
Runners-up: 2019

- Brent Invitational

Champions: 2003

=== Individual ===
- Joyce Landagan

2000 UAAP Best Striker

- Mary Cres Ignacio

2005 UAAP Rookie of the Year
2008 UAAP MVP

- Louella Leah Amamuyo

2006 UAAP Rookie of the Year
2008 UAAP Best Defender

- Jade Bejemino

2006 UAAP Coach of the Year

- Marianne Narciso

2008 UAAP Rookie of the Year
2009, 2010, 2011 UAAP Best Striker

- Irish Jane Rapal

2008 UAAP Best Goalkeeper

- Arlene May Gavile

2009 UAAP Best Goalkeeper

- Prescila Rubio

2009 MMGFA MVP

- Pearl Anjannete Aguilar

2010 UAAP Rookie of the Year

- Zipporah Luna

2010, 2013 UAAP Best Goalkeeper

- Marice Magdolot

2011 UAAP MVP

- Aiza Mondero

2011 UAAP Best Midfielder

- Jena Abuan

2013 UAAP Best Defender

- Chanda Solite

2016 UAAP Mythical team

- Charisa Marie Lemoran

2016 PFF Best Midfielder
2017 UAAP Mythical team

- Ivy Lopez

2016 PFF Best Defender

- Hazel Lustan

2017 UAAP Mythical team
2018 PFF Best Midfielder

- Aira Ilan

2017 UAAP Mythical team

- Mary Joy Indac

2017 UAAP Rookie of the Year

- Shelah Mae Cadag

2018 UAAP Best Striker
2019 PFF Best Midfielder

== Past rosters ==
2007 UNIGAMES champion squad
Jovelyn Artillaga ∙ Jowe-Ann Barruga ∙ Joma Clemente ∙ Carra Francell Dagandara ∙ Vanessa Anne Fabon ∙ Shiralyn Francisco ∙ Ma. Christine Fuertes
Arlene May Gavile ∙ Mary Cres Ignacio ∙ Hannah Faith Luna ∙ Angelica Martinez ∙ Bea Katrina Maximo ∙ Aiza Mondero ∙ Marianne Narciso ∙ Jane Mariz Pacaña
Patricia Perlas ∙ Irish Jane Rapal ∙ Nikki Regalado ∙ Prescila Rubio ∙ Herlyn Mae Salmon
Head coach: Jade Bejemino

2008 UAAP champion squad
Louella Leah Amamuyo ∙ Jovelyn Artillaga ∙ Jowe-Ann Barruga ∙ Joma Clemente ∙ Carra Francell Dagandara ∙ Vanessa Anne Fabon
Shiralyn Francisco ∙ Ma. Christine Fuertes ∙ Arlene May Gavile ∙ Mary Cres Ignacio ∙ Hannah Faith Luna ∙ Angelica Martinez ∙ Bea Katrina Maximo
Aiza Mondero ∙ Marianne Narciso ∙ Jane Mariz Pacaña ∙ Irish Jane Rapal ∙ Aprilyn Reyes (captain) ∙ Prescila Rubio ∙ Herlyn Mae Salmon
Head coach: Rozano Estrabon

2009 UNIGAMES champion squad
Jae Marie Abuan ∙ Pearl Anjanette Aguilar ∙ Jovelyn Artillaga ∙ Jowe-Ann Barruga ∙ Joma Clemente ∙ Carra Francell Dagandara ∙ Vanessa Anne Fabon
Ma. Christine Fuertes ∙ Arlene May Gavile ∙ Mary Cres Ignacio ∙ Hannah Faith Luna ∙ Zipporah Luna ∙ Marice Magdolot ∙ Marie Magdolot
Audrey Rose Mariano ∙ Gabrielle Angela Mercado ∙ Marianne Narciso ∙ Jane Mariz Pacaña ∙ Nikki Regalado ∙ Isabela Francesca Rivilla ∙ Prescila Rubio
Herlyn Mae Salmon
Head coach: Rozano Estrabon

2011 UAAP champion squad
Jae Marie Abuan ∙ Jena Ralyn Abuan ∙ Pearl Anjanette Aguilar ∙ Jowe-Ann Barruga ∙ Jennizel Cabalan ∙ Joma Clemente ∙ Cara Jamile Corpus
Carra Francell Dagandara ∙ Vanessa Anne Fabon ∙ Ma. Christine Fuertes ∙ Trixia Grace Jalbuena ∙ Hannah Faith Luna ∙ Zipporah Luna
Marice Magdolot ∙ Marie Magdolot ∙ Aiza Mondero (captain) ∙ Marianne Narciso ∙ Isabela Francesca Rivilla ∙ Chanda Solite
Head coach: Rozano Estrabon

2013 PFL Ang Liga Filipina champion squad
Jae Marie Abuan ∙ Jena Ralyn Abuan ∙ Nina Mariebenn Acuna ∙ Pearl Anjanette Aguilar ∙ Anishah Grace Buison ∙ Jennizel Cabalan ∙ Nikki Castroverde
Jan Christelle Cleofe ∙ Ma. Christine Fuertes ∙ Aira Ilan ∙ Diane Jazul ∙ Zipporah Luna ∙ Marice Magdolot ∙ Marie Magdolot ∙ Daryl Ann Mendoza
Isabela Francesca Rivilla ∙ Chanda Solite (captain) ∙ Marielle Allison Sutacio ∙ Cheska Jane Toledo
Head coach: Sorito Judal Jr.
