= 2015 AFF Women's Championship squads =

Below are the squads for the 2015 AFF Women's Championship, hosted by Vietnam, which took place between 1–10 May 2015.

== Group A ==
=== Australia U20 ===
Head coach: Ante Juric

No.	Pos.	Player	Date of birth (age)	Club
1	GK	Teagan Micah	20 October 1997 (aged 17)	(Football Australia) Brisbane Roar
18	GK	Gabrielle Dal Busco	16 July 1997 (aged 17)	(Football Australia) Perth Glory
21	GK	Hannah Southwell	4 March 1999 (aged 16)	(Football Australia) Newcastle Jets
2	DF	Monique Iannella	1 August 1996 (aged 18)	(Football Australia) Adelaide United
3	DF	Emma Checker	11 March 1996 (aged 19)	(Football Australia) Melbourne Victory
4	DF	Ellie Carpenter	28 April 2000 (aged 15)	(Football Australia) FNSW Institute
5	DF	Angela Beard	16 August 1997 (aged 17)	(Football Australia) Brisbane Roar
12	DF	Annabel Martin	23 October 1998 (aged 16)	(Football Australia) NTC U17 Girls
13	DF	Brooke Goodrich	7 June 1997 (aged 17)	(Football Australia) Brisbane Roar
14	DF	Chloe O'Brien	22 August 1997 (aged 17)	(Football Australia) Western Sydney Wanderers
26	DF	Natasha Prior	20 January 1998 (aged 17)	(Football Australia) FNSW Institute
6	MF	Natalie Tobin	13 October 1996 (aged 18)	(Football Australia) Sydney FC
15	MF	Kobie Ferguson	31 March 1999 (aged 16)	(Football Australia) Emerging Jets
16	MF	Julia De Angelis	8 September 1997 (aged 17)	(Football Australia) Canberra United
17	MF	Olivia Price	17 May 1996 (aged 18)	(Football Australia) Sydney FC
25	MF	Dylan Holmes	22 March 1997 (aged 18)	(Football Australia) Fulham United
7	FW	Sunny Franco	10 June 1997 (aged 17)	(Football Australia) Brisbane Roar
8	FW	Amy Harrison (c)	21 April 1996 (aged 19)	(Football Australia) Sydney FC
9	FW	Jordan Baker	1 November 1996 (aged 18)	(Football Australia) Western Sydney Wanderers
10	FW	Alexandra Chidiac	15 January 1999 (aged 16)	(Football Australia) Adelaide United
11	FW	Beattie Goad	31 May 1997 (aged 17)	(Football Australia) Melbourne Victory
19	FW	Panagiota Petratos	28 June 1999 (aged 15)	(Football Australia) FNSW Institute
20	FW	Princess Ibini	31 January 2000 (aged 15)	(Football Australia) Inner West Magic
22	FW	Kally Lewis	7 June 1997 (aged 17)	(Football Australia) Emerging Jets
23	FW	Emily Condon	1 September 1998 (aged 16)	(Football Australia) Adelaide United
24	FW	Ashlee Brodigan	19 September 1999 (aged 15)	(Football Australia) Emerging Jets

=== Indonesia ===
Head coach: Rully Nere

No.	Pos.	Player	Date of birth (age)	Club
	GK	Riska Julianti	10 July 1998 (aged 16)	(Football Association of Indonesia) Bangka Belitung
	GK	Vera Lestari	17 January 1995 (aged 20)	(Football Association of Indonesia) Yogyakarta
	DF	Renays Ellin Clousse Bisay	19 April 1996 (aged 19)	(Football Association of Indonesia) East Java
	DF	Nur Laili	7 June 1996 (aged 18)	(Football Association of Indonesia) East Java
	DF	Dewi Maysaroh	5 June 1994 (aged 20)	(Football Association of Indonesia) East Java
	DF	Idea Rifki Agustin	27 August 1995 (aged 19)	(Football Association of Indonesia) Yogyakarta
	DF	Dwi Aprilani	26 April 1991 (aged 24)	(Football Association of Indonesia) Yogyakarta
	DF	Ruth Wamblolo	9 December 1994 (aged 20)	(Football Association of Indonesia) Papua
	MF	Tugiyati Cindy	21 July 1985 (aged 29)	(Football Association of Indonesia) Yogyakarta
	MF	Intan Nuraini	17 April 1993 (aged 22)	(Football Association of Indonesia) Jakarta
	MF	Erma Novela Sabatin	25 November 1996 (aged 18)	(Football Association of Indonesia) East Java
	MF	Lilla Puspita	27 May 1989 (aged 25)	(Football Association of Indonesia) East Java
	MF	Ade Mustikiana	3 October 1999 (aged 15)	(Football Association of Indonesia) Bangka Belitung
	MF	Christina Kaisiri (c)	14 February 1995 (aged 20)	(Football Association of Indonesia) Papua
	MF	Emmy Clarce Valentina Awes	17 August 1995 (aged 19)	(Football Association of Indonesia) Papua
	MF	Marlisye Monalisa	3 October 1991 (aged 23)	(Football Association of Indonesia) Papua
	MF	Henny Yigibalom	2 November 1993 (aged 21)	(Football Association of Indonesia) Papua
	MF	Rulin Aspalek	1 March 1994 (aged 21)	(Football Association of Indonesia) Papua
	FW	Akudiana Tebai	18 December 1991 (aged 23)	(Football Association of Indonesia) East Java
	FW	Siti Latipah	18 October 1995 (aged 19)	(Football Association of Indonesia) West Java

=== Laos ===
Head coach: Kovanh Namthavixay

=== Thailand ===
Head coach: Nuengrutai Srathongvian

No.	Pos.	Player	Date of birth (age)	Club
1	GK	Waraporn Boonsing	16 February 1990 (aged 25)	Unknown
2	DF	Darut Changplook	3 February 1988 (aged 27)	Unknown
3	DF	Natthakarn Chinwong	15 March 1992 (aged 23)	Unknown
4	DF	Duangnapa Sritala (captain)	4 February 1986 (aged 29)	Unknown
5	MF	Ainon Phancha	26 January 1992 (aged 23)	Unknown
6	MF	Pikul Khueanpet	20 September 1988 (aged 26)	Unknown
7	MF	Silawan Intamee	22 January 1994 (aged 21)	Unknown
8	MF	Naphat Seesraum	11 May 1987 (aged 27)	Unknown
9	DF	Warunee Phetwiset	13 December 1990 (aged 24)	Unknown
10	DF	Sunisa Srangthaisong	6 May 1988 (aged 26)	Unknown
11	FW	Alisa Rukpinij	2 February 1995 (aged 20)	Unknown
12	MF	Rattikan Thongsombut	7 July 1991 (aged 23)	Unknown
13	MF	Orathai Srimanee	12 June 1988 (aged 26)	Unknown
14	MF	Nattaya Duanjanthuek	9 June 1991 (aged 23)	Unknown
15	MF	Irravadee Makris	20 January 1992 (aged 23)	Unknown
16	DF	Khwanrudi Saengchan	19 May 1991 (aged 23)	Unknown
17	MF	Anootsara Maijarern	14 February 1986 (aged 29)	Unknown
18	GK	Yada Sengyong	10 September 1993 (aged 21)	Unknown
19	FW	Taneekarn Dangda	15 December 1992 (aged 22)	Unknown
20	MF	Wilaiporn Boothduang	25 June 1987 (aged 27)	Unknown
21	FW	Kanjana Sungngoen	21 September 1986 (aged 28)	Unknown
22	GK	Jantima Khunpiphat	29 August 1994 (aged 20)	Unknown
23	FW	Nisa Romyen	18 January 1990 (aged 25)	Unknown

== Group B ==
=== Malaysia ===
Head coach: Asyraaf Abdullah

No.	Pos.	Player	Date of birth (age)	Club
1	GK	Roszaini Bakar	17 October 1990 (aged 24)	(Football Association of Malaysia) Armed Forces FA
22	GK	Asma Junaidi	18 November 1992 (aged 22)	(Football Association of Malaysia) Sabah FA
25	GK	Zawani Nisha Habib Rahman	10 September 1989 (aged 25)	(Football Association of Malaysia) Sabah FA
2	DF	Nur Atikah Abdul Wahab	2 October 1988 (aged 26)	(Football Association of Malaysia) Armed Forces FA
5	DF	Norsuriani Mazli	27 April 1990 (aged 25)	(Football Association of Malaysia) Pahang FA
8	DF	Eslilah Esar	18 July 1989 (aged 25)	(Football Association of Malaysia) Sabah FA
9	DF	Usliza Usman	20 May 1995 (aged 19)	(Football Association of Malaysia) Sabah FA
13	DF	Lovelytha Jelus	26 August 1991 (aged 23)	(Football Association of Malaysia) Polis Di-Raja Malaysia
17	DF	Malini Nordin	29 December 1985 (aged 29)	(Football Association of Malaysia) Negeri Sembilan Matrix
20	DF	Masturah Majid	5 February 1990 (aged 25)	(Football Association of Malaysia) Sabah FA
4	MF	Leonie Vitus	24 March 1981 (aged 34)	(Football Association of Malaysia) Sabah FA
6	MF	Zaffeka Zakaria	25 July 1986 (aged 28)	(Football Association of Malaysia) Sabah FA
9	MF	Haindee Mosroh	17 April 1993 (aged 22)	(Football Association of Malaysia) Sabah FA
11	MF	Siti Fairuz Abd Somad	10 April 1986 (aged 29)	
14	MF	Norhanisa Yahya	24 April 1989 (aged 26)	(Football Association of Malaysia) Polis Di-Raja Malaysia
16	MF	Masyita Mohd Tajib	16 January 1989 (aged 26)	(Football Association of Malaysia) Sabah FA
19	MF	Dardee Rofinus	7 January 1990 (aged 25)	(Football Association of Malaysia) Sabah FA
21	MF	Shereilynn Elly Pius	20 August 1991 (aged 23)	(Football Association of Malaysia) Sabah FA
23	MF	Jaciah Jumilis	23 July 1991 (aged 23)	(Football Association of Malaysia) Sabah FA
24	MF	Nur Atika Omar	25 May 1990 (aged 24)	(Football Association of Malaysia) Sabah FA
12	FW	Angela Kais (c)	7 September 1980 (aged 34)	(Football Association of Malaysia) Polis Di-Raja Malaysia
18	FW	Sihaya Ajad	10 March 1990 (aged 25)	(Football Association of Malaysia) Polis Di-Raja Malaysia

=== Myanmar ===
Head coach: Daw Thet Thet Win.

No.	Pos.	Player	Date of birth (age)	Club
1	GK	Mya Phu Ngon	10 August 1989 (aged 25)	Unknown
2	DF	Khin Than Wai	2 November 1995 (aged 19)	Unknown
3	DF	Zin Mar Win	2 January 1990 (aged 25)	Unknown
4	DF	Wai Wai Aung	5 October 1993 (aged 21)	Unknown
5	DF	Phu Pwint Khaing	23 July 1989 (aged 25)	Unknown
6	MF	San San Maw (captain)	5 October 1980 (aged 34)	Unknown
7	MF	Than Than Htwe	24 July 1986 (aged 28)	Unknown
8	MF	Naw Ar Lo Wer Phaw	11 January 1988 (aged 27)	Unknown
9	FW	Yee Yee Oo	1 October 1990 (aged 24)	Unknown
10	FW	Khin Marlar Tun	21 May 1988 (aged 26)	Unknown
11	MF	Khin Moe Wai	16 December 1989 (aged 25)	Unknown
12	FW	Win Theingi Tun	1 February 1995 (aged 20)	Unknown
13	FW	May Thu Kyaw	10 November 1995 (aged 19)	Unknown
14	DF	Nge Nge Htwe	9 March 1998 (aged 17)	Unknown
15	FW	Hla Yin Win	20 October 1995 (aged 19)	Unknown
16	MF	Yuper Khine	31 January 1996 (aged 19)	Unknown
17	MF	May Sabai Phoo	31 July 1996 (aged 18)	Unknown
18	GK	Khin Thidar Aye	23 March 1993 (aged 22)	Unknown
19	DF	Zar Chi Oo	6 May 1988 (aged 26)	Unknown
20	GK	Thandar Oo	29 September 1997 (aged 17)	Unknown
21	MF	Le Le Hlaing	24 March 1997 (aged 18)	Unknown
22	DF	Aye Aye Moe	4 February 1995 (aged 20)	Unknown
23	FW	Nilar Win	19 March 1997 (aged 18)	Unknown

=== Philippines ===
Head coach: Buda Bautista

No.	Pos.	Player	Date of birth (age)	Club
1	GK	Inna Palacios (c)	9 November 1994 (aged 20)	(Philippine Football Federation) De La Salle Lady Booters
13	GK	Hanna Maiya Ibarra	13 June 1989 (aged 25)	(Philippine Football Federation) Green Archers United
6	DF	Pearl Aguilar	2 May 1994 (aged 20)	(Philippine Football Federation) UST Lady Booters
10	DF	Alesa Dolino	26 October 1992 (aged 22)	(Philippine Football Federation) FEU Lady Tamaraws
12	DF	Analou Amita	9 May 1993 (aged 21)	(Philippine Football Federation) FEU Lady Tamaraws
17	DF	Natasha Alquiros	17 January 1991 (aged 24)	(Philippine Football Federation) Green Archers United
27	DF	Rachelle Labajo	27 October 1994 (aged 20)	(Philippine Football Federation) DLSZ Junior Booters
2	MF	Raylene Larot	4 May 1991 (aged 23)	(United States Soccer Federation) Sacramento State Athletics
3	MF	Marice Magdolot	31 July 1993 (aged 21)	(Philippine Football Federation) UST Lady Booters
5	MF	Jennizel Cabalan	6 September 1994 (aged 20)	(Philippine Football Federation) UST Lady Booters
7	MF	Jean Kadil	8 March 1996 (aged 19)	(Philippine Football Federation) FEU Lady Tamaraws
8	MF	Antonnete Amoncio	29 November 1995 (aged 19)	(Philippine Football Federation) Ateneo Lady Booters
11	MF	Sharmine Siaotong	9 November 1994 (aged 20)	(Philippine Football Federation) FEU Lady Tamaraws
15	MF	Hanna Parado	30 January 1996 (aged 19)	(United States Soccer Federation) North Florida Ospreys
19	MF	Sara Castañeda	5 December 1996 (aged 18)	(Philippine Football Federation) DLSZ Junior Booters
20	MF	Marie Navea-Huff	28 May 1993 (aged 21)	(Philippine Football Federation) UP Lady Maroons
26	MF	Aisa Mondero	26 October 1989 (aged 25)	(Philippine Football Federation) Sikat F.C.
4	FW	Marianne Narciso	8 August 1991 (aged 23)	(Philippine Football Federation) UST Lady Booters
9	FW	Jesse Shugg	2 May 1992 (aged 22)	Unattached
16	FW	Mary Rose Obra	15 August 1995 (aged 19)	(Philippine Football Federation) UP Lady Maroons
23	FW	Joana Houplin	12 February 1990 (aged 25)	(United States Soccer Federation) Seattle Sounders Women

=== Vietnam ===
Head coach: (Japan) Takashi Norimatsu
