= Christina de los Reyes =

Filipino footballer

Personal information
- Full name: Christina Marie Marañon de los Reyes
- Date of birth: February 28, 1994 (age 32)
- Place of birth: Quezon City, Philippines
- Position: Forward

College career
Years	Team	Apps	(Gls)
–	University of the Philippines Diliman		

International career
2013–	Philippines		(2)

Christina Marie Marañon de los Reyes (born 28 February 1994) is a Filipino footballer who has played for the Philippines women's national team.

== College career ==
De los Reyes played for the UP Lady Booters of the University of the Philippines Diliman. The team participates in the UAAP and the PFF Women's League. She helped UP reach the UAAP finals twice.

UP lost to Far Eastern University in the UAAP Season 77 finals. The following season, UP had more success, clinching their first ever women's football title. De los Reyes scored one of the two goals in UP's 2–1 win against De La Salle University, in the UAAP Season 78 final in 2016.

== International career ==
De los Reyes has played Philippines women's national team. At the 2014 AFC Women's Asian Cup qualifiers in Bangladesh in May 2013 she scored a goal in the Philippines' 4–0 win over the host. She also played at the 2016 AFF Championship.

== International goals ==
No.	Date	Venue	Opponent	Score	Result	Competition
1.	25 May 2013	Bangbandhu National Stadium, Dhaka, Bangladesh	Bangladesh	2–0	4–0	2014 AFC Women's Asian Cup qualification
2.	30 July 2016	Mandalarthiri Stadium, Mandalay, Myanmar	Singapore	1–0	2–0	2016 AFF Women's Championship
