= 2015 PFF Women's Cup =

Tournament details
- Country: Philippines
- Dates: August 9 – September 27, 2015
- Teams: 10

Final positions
- Champions: Far Eastern University (2nd title)
- Runners-up: De La Salle University
- Third place: Ateneo de Manila
- Fourth place: University of Santo Tomas

Tournament statistics
- Matches played: 24
- Goals scored: 68 (2.83 per match)
- Top goal scorer(s): Barbie Ann Sobredo (FEU) (7 goals)

Awards
- Best player: Alesa Dolino (FEU)

The 2015 PFF Women's Cup is the 2nd edition of the cup competition. The previous and inaugural edition in 2014 used a 9-a-side format with two halves of 25 minutes. Starting from the 2015 edition, the cup competition were played in full 90 minutes with 11 field players on each team.

== Participating teams ==
Clubs; 3 teams	University Athletic Association of the Philippines; 5 collegiate teams of the UAAP + 1 second team	Football academy 1 team
Green Archers United; Síkat; Lady Tamaraws (alumni club)	Ateneo de Manila; De La Salle University; Far Eastern University; University of the Philippines; Team X; Team Y; University of Santo Tomas	Chelsea S.S. PH (The Younghusband Football Academy)

== Draw ==
The draw for the 2015 edition was made on August 5, 2015. Matches were played at the Rizal Memorial Stadium in Manila. Matches at the Biñan Football Field in Biñan, Laguna were also planned.

== Results ==
=== Group stage ===
==== Group A ====
Team	Pld	W	D	L	GF	GA	GD	Pts
Far Eastern University	4	3	0	1	6	3	+3	9
Ateneo de Manila	4	3	0	1	6	6	0	9
Green Archers United	4	2	1	1	6	3	+3	7
University of the Philippines–Y	4	1	0	3	2	9	-7	3
Síkat	4	0	1	3	3	8	-5	1

August 9, 2015

Far Eastern University	0–1	Green Archers United
Report		Romero 1'

Rizal Memorial Stadium, Manila
August 9, 2015

Ateneo de Manila	2–0	University of the Philippines–Y
Rodriguez 49', 80'	Report

Rizal Memorial Stadium, Manila

August 16, 2015

Ateneo de Manila	0–4	Far Eastern University
Rodriguez 49', 80'	Report	Sudaria 28'; Sobredo 54', 68'; Lecera 73'

Rizal Memorial Stadium, Manila
August 16, 2015

University of the Philippines–Y	2–0	Síkat
De Los Reyes 27', 90+1'	Report

Rizal Memorial Stadium, Manila

August 23, 2015

Green Archers United	1–1	Síkat
Cruz 64'	Report	Alquiros 70'

Rizal Memorial Stadium, Manila
August 23, 2015

Far Eastern University	4–0	University of the Philippines–Y
Dolino 7'; Sudaria 20', 21'; Araneta 83'	Report

Rizal Memorial Stadium, Manila

August 30, 2015

Ateneo de Manila	2–1	Síkat
Bernardo 53'; Bautista 64'	Report	Tanton 16'

Rizal Memorial Stadium, Manila
August 30, 2015

Green Archers United	3–0	University of the Philippines–Y
Narciso 17', 22', 26'	Report

Rizal Memorial Stadium, Manila

September 6, 2015

Síkat	1–3	Far Eastern University
Alquiros 89'	Report 1, 2	Araneta 15'; Sobredo 20', 23'

Rizal Memorial Stadium, Manila
September 6, 2015

Green Archers United	1–2	Ateneo de Manila
Dimatulac 69'	Report 1, 2	Martin 35'; Diaz 67'

Rizal Memorial Stadium, Manila

==== Group B ====
Team	Pld	W	D	L	GF	GA	GD	Pts
De La Salle University	4	3	1	0	11	2	+9	10
University of Santo Tomas	4	3	1	0	8	4	+4	10
Chelsea S.S. PH	4	1	1	2	6	10	-4	4
University of the Philippines–X	4	0	2	2	3	6	-3	2
Lady Tamaraws F.C.	4	0	1	3	3	9	-6	1

August 9, 2015

Chelsea S.S. PH	1–6	De La Salle University
Sabanal 90+1'	Report	Dimaandal 28', 49'; Hodges 44'; Inquig 80', 83'; Duran 90'

Rizal Memorial Stadium, Manila
August 9, 2015

University of the Philippines–X	2–2	Lady Tamaraws F.C.
K. Navea-Huff 6'; Alleje 23'	Report	Requerme 13'; Lam 61'

Rizal Memorial Stadium, Manila

August 16, 2015

University of the Philippines–X	0–0	Chelsea S.S. PH
	Report

Rizal Memorial Stadium, Manila

August 21, 2015

Lady Tamaraws F.C.	0–1	University of Santo Tomas
	Report	Jalbuena 53'

Rizal Memorial Stadium, Manila
August 21, 2015

De La Salle University	1–0	University of the Philippines–X
Hodges 42'	Report

Rizal Memorial Stadium, Manila

August 23, 2015

De La Salle University	1–1	University of Santo Tomas
Andaya 39'	Report	Lemoran 90+1'

Rizal Memorial Stadium, Manila
August 23, 2015

Chelsea S.S. PH	3–1	Lady Tamaraws F.C.
Sabanal 28'; Ramores 45+2', 70'	Report	Belluga 73'

Rizal Memorial Stadium, Manila

August 30, 2015
8:00

University of Santo Tomas	3–1	University of the Philippines–X
Acuñas 25'; Lemoran 30'; Solite 64'	Report	Obra 12'

Rizal Memorial Stadium, Manila
August 30, 2015

De La Salle University	3–0	Lady Tamaraws F.C.
Dimaandal 39'; Ledesma 56'; Hodges 79'	Report

Rizal Memorial Stadium, Manila

September 6, 2015

University of Santo Tomas	3–2	Chelsea S.S. PH
Cabalan 41', 63' Lustan 90+2'	Report 1, 2	Sanchez 22' (o.g.); Clemente 44'

Rizal Memorial Stadium, Manila

=== Knock-out stage ===
Semi-finals
September 13
FEU	3
UST	0
September 13
DLSU	1
Ateneo	0

Final
September 20/27 (Note: The match which started on September 20 at 17:30 was suspended due to heavy rain. On the 32nd minute match officials suspended the match due to the pitch being drenched by worsening rain. After 30 minutes officials decided to resume the game on September 27. The scoreline is 0–0 when the match was halted. The game was resumed as planned from the 32nd minute.)
FEU	2
DLSU	1
Third place
September 20
UST	3
Ateneo	4

==== Semifinal ====
September 13, 2015
14:00

Far Eastern University	3–0	University of Santo Tomas
Sudaria 13'; Sobredo 48', 49'	Report

Rizal Memorial Stadium, Manila
September 13, 2015
16:00

De La Salle University	1–0	Ateneo de Manila
Hodges 87'	Report

Rizal Memorial Stadium, Manila

==== Third place ====
September 20, 2015
14:30

University of Santo Tomas	3–4	Ateneo de Manila
Lemoran 27'; 47' (o.g.); Cabalan 84'	Report 1, 2	Diaz 6'; Bautista 73'; Bernardo 82'; Rodriguez 87'

Rizal Memorial Stadium, Manila

==== Final ====
September 20/27, 2015
16:00

Far Eastern University	2–1	De La Salle University
Dolino; Sobredo 66'	Report	Metillo 70'

Rizal Memorial Stadium, Manila

== Awards ==
- Champions:Far Eastern University
- Fair Play Award: Far Eastern University
- Golden Glove: Kimberly Pariña (FEU)
- Best Midfielder: Irish Navaja (DLSU)
- Golden Boot: Barbie Sobredo (FEU)
- Best Defender/MVP: Alesa Dolino (FEU)

Source:Tiebreaker Times

== See also ==
- 2014–15 PFF National Men's Club Championship
