= Shelah Cadag =

Filipino footballer (born 1998)

Personal information
- Full name: Shelah Mae Robiso Cadag
- Date of birth: August 5, 1998 (age 28)
- Place of birth: Kitaotao, Bukidnon, Philippines
- Position: Forward

Team information
- Current team: Kaya–Iloilo
- Number: 6

College career
Years	Team	Apps	(Gls)
2015–?	University of Santo Tomas		

Senior career*
Years	Team	Apps	(Gls)
2022–2024	Kaya–Iloilo		
2024	→ Odisha (loan)		
2024–	Kaya–Iloilo		

International career
2018–	Philippines	6	(7)
2025–	Philippines (futsal)		
- * Club domestic league appearances and goals

Shelah Mae Robiso Cadag (born August 5, 1998) is a Filipino professional footballer who plays as a forward for Kaya–Iloilo of the PFF Women's League. She represents the Philippines at international level for football and futsal.

== College career ==
Shelah Mae Cadag played for the women's football team of the University of Santo Tomas (UST) which plays in the University Athletic Association of the Philippines (UAAP) and the PFF Women's League.

In UAAP Season 80, Cadag helped UST secure a place in the women's football final by scoring a brace in her collegiate team's second match against the De La Salle University which ended in a 5–2 win for UST. The UAAP Season 80 women's football final was contested by the same two teams with De La Salle winning 2–1 over UST. Cadag scored the sole goal for UST and was named the Best Striker for the season.

== Club career ==
=== Kaya FC–Iloilo ===
Cadag joined Kaya–Iloilo on November 5, 2022. She would be named the Most Valuable Player for the 2023 PFF Women's League season, where Kaya won its first ever league title.

==== Loan to Odisha ====
On February 15, 2024, Kaya announced that she would be loaned to Indian Women's League club Odisha until March.

== International career ==
Cadag made her first appearance for the Philippines women's national football team in the first round of the 2020 AFC Women's Olympic Qualifying Tournament held in November 2018. The Philippines won 9–0 over Singapore on their first match in the qualifiers on November 4, 2018, where Cadag managed to score a hat-trick. Cadag repeated the same feat in the Philippines' 5–1 win over Mongolia on November 11.

== International goals ==
Scores and results list the Philippines' goal tally first.

#	Date	Venue	Opponent	Score	Result	Competition
1.	November 4, 2018	Hisor Central Stadium, Hisor, Tajikistan	Singapore	1–0	9–0	2020 Summer Olympics qualification
2.	November 4, 2018	Hisor Central Stadium, Hisor, Tajikistan	Singapore	2–0	9–0	2020 Summer Olympics qualification
3.	November 4, 2018	Hisor Central Stadium, Hisor, Tajikistan	Singapore	5–0	9–0	2020 Summer Olympics qualification
4.	November 8, 2018	Hisor Central Stadium, Hisor, Tajikistan	Tajikistan	1–1	3–1	2020 Summer Olympics qualification
5.	November 11, 2018	Hisor Central Stadium, Hisor, Tajikistan	Mongolia	1–0	5–1	2020 Summer Olympics qualification
6.	November 11, 2018	Hisor Central Stadium, Hisor, Tajikistan	Mongolia	2–0	5–1	2020 Summer Olympics qualification
7.	November 11, 2018	Hisor Central Stadium, Hisor, Tajikistan	Mongolia	5–1	5–1	2020 Summer Olympics qualification

== Honors ==
Kaya–Iloilo

- PFF Women's League: 2023, 2025
- PFF Women's Cup runner-up: 2024

Odisha

- Indian Women's League: 2023–24

UST Lady Booters

- UAAP runner-up: 2018 (Season 80)

Individual

- PFF Women's League Best Midfielder: 2019–20
- PFF Women's League Most Valuable Player: 2023
