= Mea Bernal =

Filipino footballer

Personal information
- Full name: Mea Dematao Bernal
- Date of birth: 24 November 1989 (age 36)
- Place of birth: Manolo Fortich, Philippines
- Position: Defender

Senior career*
| Years | Team | Apps | (Gls) |
- OutKast
| 2022– | Manila Digger | 1 | (0) |

International career
| –2019 | Philippines | | (2) |
- * Club domestic league appearances and goals

Mea Dematao Bernal (born 24 November 1989) is a Filipino footballer who plays as a defender for PFF Women's League club Manila Digger. She has also played for the Philippines women's national team.

Bernal scored her first international goal in the Philippines 11–0 win over Macau in a friendly held in Carmona on 3 August 2019.

She has also played for the women's football team of the Far Eastern University in the UAAP Football Championship. In the 2013 season, Bernal was named as the Best Defender.

== International career ==
=== International goals ===
Scores and results list the Philippines' goal tally first.

| # | Date | Venue | Opponent | Score | Result | Competition |
|---|---|---|---|---|---|---|
| 1. | 3 August 2019 | PFF National Training Centre, Carmona, Philippines | Macau | 11–0 | 11–0 | Friendly |
| 2. | 15 September 2019 | Tseung Kwan O Sports Ground, Tseung Kwan O, Hong Kong | Hong Kong | 1–1 | 1–1 | Friendly |
