= Sara Castañeda =

Filipino footballer (born 1996)

Personal information
- Full name: Sara Isobel Arrieta Castañeda
- Date of birth: December 5, 1996 (age 29)
- Place of birth: San Juan, Philippines
- Position: Midfielder

Team information
- Current team: Kaya-Iloilo
- Number: 21

Youth career
- De La Salle Zobel
- Makati

College career
Years	Team	Apps	(Gls)
2014–	De La Salle University		

Senior career*
Years	Team	Apps	(Gls)
2023-	Kaya-Iloilo		

International career^{‡}
–	Philippines U16		
–	Philippines U19		
2015–	Philippines	46	(10)
2025–	Philippines (futsal)	4	(0)
- * Club domestic league appearances and goals ‡ National team caps and goals as of April 8, 2025

Sara Isobel Arrieta Castañeda (born December 5, 1996) is a Filipino footballer who plays as a midfielder for PFF Women's League club Kaya-Iloilo and the Philippines women's national team.

== Youth and collegiate career ==
Castañeda has a younger brother and sister, Anicka Castañeda. She took up the sport of football at age 5, after witnessing her brother play for the Makati Football Club. She attended De La Salle Zobel for her high school studies and was part of her school's football team. During her high stint, she was awarded the Athlete of the Year twice.

Castañeda later played for the football team of her college, De La Salle University. With her team, she competed in 2016 in the UAAP Season 78 football tournaments and scored in the final against UP Lady Maroons but lost with 1–2. She became after the tournament Rookie of the Year.

== International career ==
Before her stint with her college, Castañeda has already played for the under-16 and under-19 Philippine national football teams. She made her debut for the senior team at age 18 in May 2015 at the 2015 AFF Women's Championship. She also participated in the 2016 edition.

Castañeda helped the Philippines qualify for their first AFC Women's Asian Cup since the qualification stage was introduced. She scored 4 goals in the 2018 AFC Women's Asian Cup qualifiers in 2017 including the equalizer in the 1–1 tie against Bahrain that secured the Philippines qualification for the 2018 edition of the continental tournament.

Despite Castañeda's contribution to the qualification, she had to secure a berth for the Philippine squad that will participate at the final tournament of the 2018 AFC Women's Asian Cup. By February 2018 she was removed from the national pool but was later reinstated. She was included in the final-23 roster for the 2018 and 2022 AFC Women's Asian Cup. In the 2022 tournament where the Philippines qualified for their first ever FIFA Women's World Cup, she was mostly utilized as a substitute.

=== International goals ===
Scores and results list the Philippines' goal tally first.

#	Date	Venue	Opponent	Score	Result	Competition
1.	April 3, 2017	Pamir Stadium, Dushanbe, Tajikistan	United Arab Emirates	4–0	4–0	2018 AFC Women's Asian Cup qualification
2.	April 5, 2017	Pamir Stadium, Dushanbe, Tajikistan	Iraq	3–0	4–0	2018 AFC Women's Asian Cup qualification
3.	April 7, 2017	Pamir Stadium, Dushanbe, Tajikistan	Tajikistan	4–0	8–0	2018 AFC Women's Asian Cup qualification
4.	April 10, 2017	Pamir Stadium, Dushanbe, Tajikistan	Bahrain	1–0	1–1	2018 AFC Women's Asian Cup qualification
5.	November 4, 2018	Hisor Central Stadium, Hisor, Tajikistan	Singapore	7–0	9–0	2020 Summer Olympics qualification
6.	November 8, 2018	Hisor Central Stadium, Hisor, Tajikistan	Tajikistan	2–1	3–1	2020 Summer Olympics qualification
7.	November 8, 2018	Hisor Central Stadium, Hisor, Tajikistan	Tajikistan	3–1	3–1	2020 Summer Olympics qualification
8.	April 9, 2019	Grand Hamad Stadium, Doha, Qatar	Palestine	6–0	7–0	2020 Summer Olympics qualification
9.	April 9, 2019	Grand Hamad Stadium, Doha, Qatar	Palestine	7–0	7–0	2020 Summer Olympics qualification
10.	17 August 2019	IPE Chonburi Stadium 1, Chonburi, Thailand	Timor-Leste	2–0	7–0	2019 AFF Women's Championship

== Honours ==
Kaya–Iloilo

- PFF Women's League: 2023
- PFF Women's Cup runner-up: 2024

Individual

- PFF Women's League Most Valuable Player: 2016–17
