= Charisa Lemoran =

Filipino footballer (born 1998)

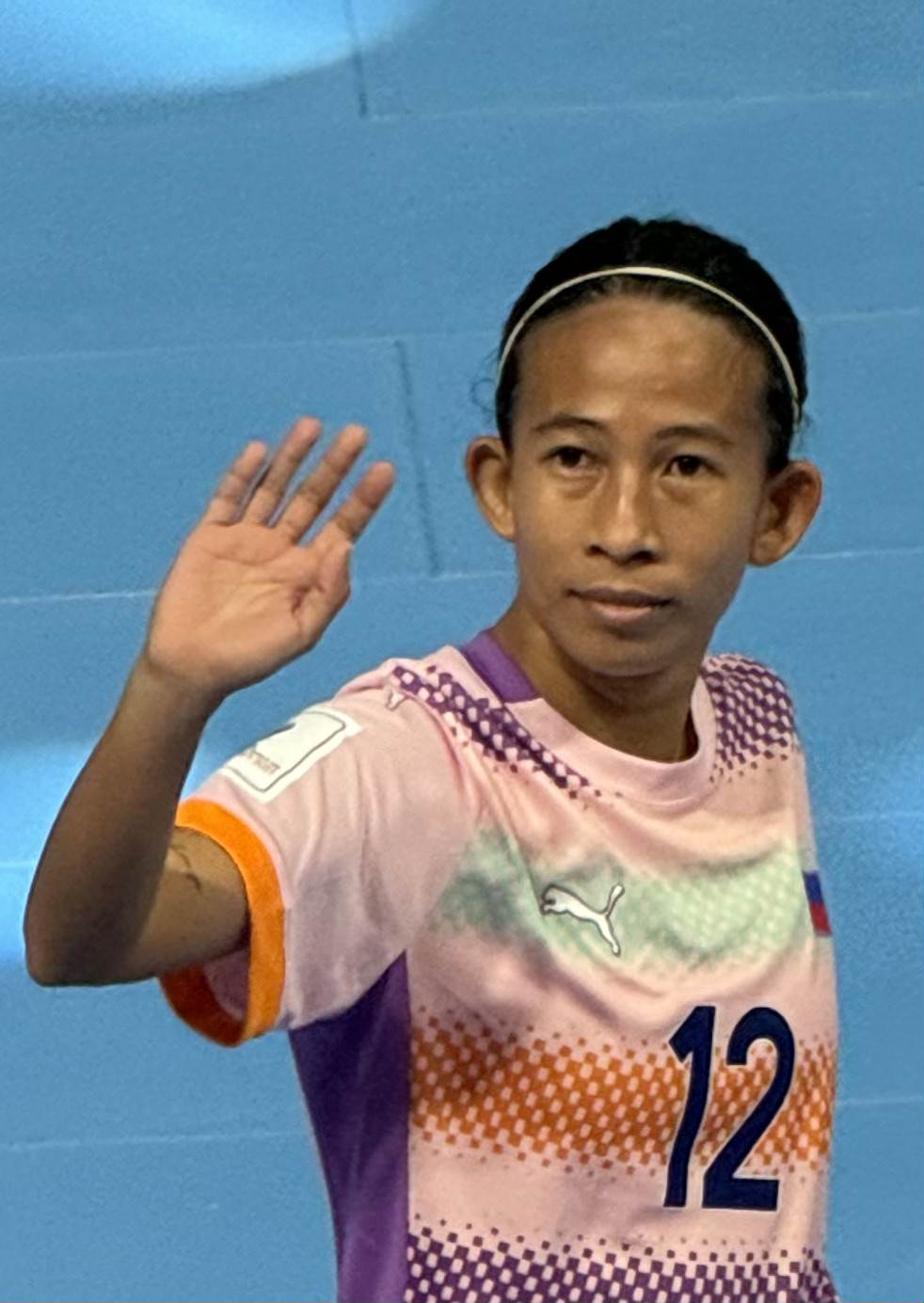
- Lemoran at the 2025 FIFA Futsal Women's World Cup

Personal information
- Full name: Charisa Marie Casalda Lemoran
- Date of birth: September 21, 1998 (age 28)
- Place of birth: San Carlos, Negros Occidental, Philippines
- Position: Midfielder

Team information
- Current team: Kaya-Iloilo
- Number: 20

College career
Years	Team	Apps	(Gls)
2016–2020	University of Santo Tomas		(~21)

Senior career*
Years	Team	Apps	(Gls)
2022–2024	Kaya-Iloilo		
2025–2026	Stallion Laguna	4	(0)
2026–	Kaya-Iloilo		

International career^{‡}
2017–	Philippines	26	(1)
2025–	Philippines (futsal)	7	(0)
- * Club domestic league appearances and goals ‡ National team caps and goals as of November 27, 2025

Charisa Marie Casalda Lemoran (born September 21, 1998) is a Filipino professional footballer who plays as a midfielder for PFF Women's League side Kaya-Iloilo and the Philippines women's national football team. She also represents the country at international level in futsal.

== Career ==
=== Youth ===
Prior to college, Lemoran represented her hometown of San Carlos winning several titles in Negros Occidental provincial tournaments.

=== College ===
Charisa Marie Casalda Lemoran plays for the University of Santo Tomas (UST) women's team which competes in University Athletic Association of the Philippines (UAAP) Football Championship. In 2016, Lemoran debuted for UST as a first year student in UAAP Season 78 scoring at least three goals. UST also played at the PFF Women's League, which featured both club and collegiate sides. In the 2016–17 season she was named as Best Midfielder.

In 2017, at UAAP Season 79, she led her school by scoring 11 of 16 goals scored by UST in the entire season. Her feat lead to the return of UST in the final where it lost to the De La Salle University. She was named part of Mythical XI team for the season along with three other teammates.

Lemoran was named as the Most Promising Player at the Dumaguete–Negros Oriental-hosted 3rd Pinay in Action Cup, an invitational collegiate tournament UST joined and won. She managed to help her team reach the final again in UAAP Season 80 in 2018 and faced De La Salle once again by scoring seven goals. Lemoran was instrumental in scoring an equalizing goal of the match, passing the ball to Shelah Cadag who scored the goal but ultimately lost that match against De La Salle which ended in a 1–2 defeat.

=== Club ===
Lemoran joined Kaya–Iloilo on November 5, 2022.

=== International ===
Lemoran received her first call up to Philippines women's national football team in 2017 and was set to play in the 2017 Southeast Asian Games. She was not initially included in the training pool in July 2017 but the injury of some players led to her inclusion. She was also considered to form the Philippine squad which participated at the 2018 AFC Women's Asian Cup qualifiers but had to beg off due to academic reasons. She also played in the 2018 AFF Women's Championship.

== International goals ==
Scores and results list Philippines's goal tally first.

No.	Date	Venue	Opponent	Score	Result	Competition
1.	August 17, 2019	IPE Chonburi Stadium, Chonburi, Thailand	Timor-Leste	7–0	7–0	2019 AFF Women's Championship

== Honors ==
Kaya–Iloilo

- PFF Women's League: 2023
- PFF Women's Cup: 2022; runner-up: 2024

Individual

- PFF Women's League Best Midfielder: 2016–17, 2023
