= 2015 Ho Chi Minh City International Women Football Tournament =

Giải bóng đá nữ quốc tế Thành phố Hồ Chí Minh Năm 2015

Tournament details
- Host country: Vietnam
- Dates: 4–8 November
- Teams: 4 (from 1 confederation)
- Venue(s): 1 (in 1 host city)

Final positions
- Champions: (Vietnam) Ho Chi Minh (1st title)
- Runners-up: Myanmar U-21
- Third place: Hong Kong
- Fourth place: (Philippines) Far Eastern University

Tournament statistics
- Matches played: 6
- Goals scored: 24 (4 per match)

The 2015 Ho Chi Minh City International Women Football Tournament is an invitational women's football tournament hosted in Ho Chi Minh City, Vietnam. This will be the first time that Vietnam will host an international women's football tournament.

Ho Chi Minh City F.C. won the round-robin tournament, Myanmar U-21 finished second place, Hong Kong settled for third place and the FEU Lady Tamaraws of Philippine-based Far Eastern University finished last.

== Venue ==
Ho Chi Minh City
| Thống Nhất Stadium | 2015 Ho Chi Minh City International Women Football Tournament (Vietnam) |
| Capacity: 20,000 | 2015 Ho Chi Minh City International Women Football Tournament (Vietnam) |

== Results ==
| Team | Pld | W | D | L | GF | GA | GD | Pts |
|---|---|---|---|---|---|---|---|---|
| (Vietnam) Ho Chi Minh | 3 | 3 | 0 | 0 | 12 | 0 | +12 | 9 |
| Myanmar U-21 | 3 | 2 | 0 | 1 | 9 | 1 | +8 | 6 |
| Hong Kong | 3 | 1 | 0 | 2 | 2 | 10 | −8 | 3 |
| (Philippines) Far Eastern University | 3 | 0 | 0 | 3 | 1 | 13 | −12 | 0 |

4 November 2015
16:00

| Far Eastern University (Philippines) | 0–6 | Myanmar U-21 |
|---|---|---|
| | Report | May Thu Kyaw 1'; Win Theingi Tun 5', 43', 88'; Hla Yin Win 17', 23' |

Thống Nhất Stadium, Ho Chi Minh City
4 November 2015
18:30

| Ho Chi Minh (Vietnam) | 6–0 | Hong Kong |
|---|---|---|
| Lê Hoài Lương 2x' Huỳnh Như; Trần Thị Thùy Trang; Nguyễn Thị Ngọc Hiếu; Võ Thị Thùy Trinh | Report |

Thống Nhất Stadium, Ho Chi Minh City

6 November 2015
16:00

| Hong Kong | 0–3 | Myanmar U-21 |
|---|---|---|
| | Report | ? 49', 51'; Khin Mo Mo Tun 88' |

Thống Nhất Stadium, Ho Chi Minh City
6 November 2015
18:30

| Ho Chi Minh (Vietnam) | 5–0 | (Philippines) Far Eastern University |
|---|---|---|
| Đỗ Thị Thúy Kiều 19'; Phan Thị Trang 30'; Võ Thị Thùy Trinh 45'; Nguyễn Thị Mỹ Anh 74'; Huỳnh Như 76' | Report |

Thống Nhất Stadium, Ho Chi Minh City

8 November 2015
16:00

| Hong Kong | 2–1 | (Philippines) Far Eastern University |
|---|---|---|
| Fung Nga Kei Kay 34'; Sin Chung Yee 78' | Report | Siaotong 38' |

Thống Nhất Stadium, Ho Chi Minh City
8 November 2015
18:30

| Myanmar U-21 | 0–1 | (Vietnam) Ho Chi Minh |
|---|---|---|
| | Report | Trần Thị Thùy Trang 77' |

Thống Nhất Stadium, Ho Chi Minh City

Schedule retrieved from the Hong Kong Football Association

== Awards ==
2015 HCM City International Women Football Tournament champions

Ho Chi Minh City F.C.
First title
