= UP Fighting Maroons women's football =

UP Fighting Maroons
- Full name: University of the Philippines women's football team
- Nickname: UP Fighting Maroons
- Ground: UP Diliman Football Stadium
- Head coach: Anto Gonzales
- League: PFF Women's League; UAAP
- 2023 2024–25: 7th (PFF); 4th (UAAP)
Home colours

The UP Fighting Maroons are the varsity women's football team of the University of the Philippines. They compete at the University Athletic Association of the Philippines (UAAP), as well as at the PFF Women's League, the top-flight domestic women's football league in the Philippines.

The team was also among the participants of the Philippine Ladies' Football National League, which was organized by the Philippine Ladies' Football Association in 1981. UP clinched the league title besting Philippine Air Force.

The team also participated at the 2015 PFF Women's Cup where they fielded two teams, namely University of the Philippines-X and University of the Philippines-Y.

The team won its first UAAP title in Season 78 in 2016 under the watch of their head coach, Anto Gonzales who also led the men's UP team to a football UAAP title.

== Squad ==
As of 3 December 2016

Note: Flags indicate national team as defined under FIFA eligibility rules; some limited exceptions apply. Players may hold more than one non-FIFA nationality.

No.	Pos.	Nation	Player
1	GK	PHI	Nicole Adlawan
3	FW	PHI	Christina de los Reyes (captain)
5		PHI	Donnabelle Fagsao
6	DF	PHI	Claudia Mendoza
8	DF	PHI	Patricia Malonzo
9	FW	PHI	Sofia Dungca
11	MF	PHI	Yanzie Yalong
12		PHI	Blessie Perez
13		PHI	Maxine Sebastian
14		PHI	Bianca Cabalan
15	MF	PHI	Aira Agustin

No.	Pos.	Nation	Player
16	FW	PHI	Mary Rose Obra
17	DF	PHI	Marianne Ruiz
20	MF	PHI	Marie Navea-Huff
21	DF	PHI	Cassandra Alleje
23		PHI	Alyssa Ube
24	DF	PHI	Eloisa Malmis
25	FW	PHI	Eloisa Fagsao
26	MF	PHI	Maria Santa Clara
34		PHI	Justine Dabalos
—		PHI	Ikeesha Aquino
—	GK	PHI	Vanessa Estrada

Source: Pinay Futbol

== Officials ==
As of 3 December 2016

Position	Name	Nationality
Head coach	Andres Gonzales	Philippines
Assistant coach	Franco Bambico	Philippines
Team manager	Steve Yambou	Philippines

== See also ==
- UP Fighting Maroons
