= 2023 PFF Women's League =

PFF Women's League
- Season: 2023
- Dates: June 24 – November 11
- Champions: Kaya–Iloilo (1st title)
- AFC Champions League: Kaya–Iloilo
- Matches: 49
- Goals: 230 (4.69 per match)
- Top goalscorer: Isabella Bandoja; Angelica Teves (19 goals)
- Highest scoring: Kaya FC-Iloilo 15–0 Stallion-Laguna FC
- Longest winning run: Manila Digger (5 matches)
- Longest unbeaten run: Kaya FC-Iloilo (7 matches)
- Longest winless run: Stallion Laguna FC (9 matches)
- Longest losing run: Stallion Laguna FC (9 matches)
- All statistics correct as of November 11, 2023.

The 2023 PFF Women's League season (also known as the Coca-Cola PFF Women's League for sponsorship reasons) was the fourth season of the women's national league of the Philippines, following the 2019–20 season.

De La Salle University were the defending champions. The Far Eastern University entered the season as the 2022 PFF Women's Cup winners. The league has got sponsorship from Coca-Cola in July 2023.

== Format ==
Initially planned to be a double round-robin format, the league changed to a single round-robin with the top four teams entering a knockout tournament to determine the league's champion.

The elimination round lasted from June 24 to September 17, 2023. The knockout round started on September 27 and will end with the final on November 8, 2023.

== Teams ==
10 teams participate in the fourth season, with Azzurri and Manila Digger making their debuts. Azzurri already participated in the 2022 PFF Women's Cup. 2019–20 season participants Maroons, Tigers, and Green Archers United did not enter.

Team	Head coach	Captain	Kit manufacturer	Shirt partners
Azzurri	(Philippines) Solomon Valerio	(Philippines) Princess Cristobas	(Philippines) Chronos Athletics	Azzurri Sports Clinic
De La Salle University	(Philippines) Alvin Ocampo	(Philippines) Bea Delos Reyes	(United States) Nike	Goody, NetGlobal Solutions, G-Shock
Far Eastern University	(Philippines) Joseph Villarino	(Philippines) Dionesa Tolentin	(Philippines) Hawk	Havaianas, Macbeth Footwear
Kaya–Iloilo	(Philippines) Let Dimzon	(Philippines) Charisa Lemoran	(Philippines) LGR	LBC, ICanServe, Fitogether
Manila Digger	(Philippines) Gerald Orcullo	(Philippines) Mea Bernal	(Spain) Kelme	Pacquiao 3 in 1 Coffee, Hayatt House
Manila Nomads	(Wales) Shane Cosgrove	(Philippines) Stacey Arthur	(Philippines) Chronos Athletics	Q2 HR Solutions
Stallion Laguna	(Philippines) Richard Leyble		(Philippines) Cutz Apparel	Giligan's Restaurant
Tuloy	(Japan) Taketomo Suzuki			Tuloy Foundation
University of the Philippines	(Philippines) Popoy Clarino	(Philippines) Cara Cachero	(Philippines) Blaze	SMC Infrastructure, Victory Liner
University of Santo Tomas	(Philippines) Geraldine Cabrera	(Philippines) Laurejane Piano	(Philippines) Blaze	

== Venues ==
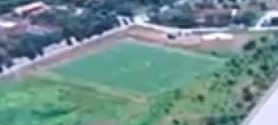
The PFF National Training Center will serve as the primary venue.

All league matches are held at the PFF National Training Center in Carmona, Cavite. Some are hosted at the Rizal Memorial Stadium in Manila.

== League table ==
Pos	Team	Pld	W	D	L	GF	GA	GD	Pts	Qualification or relegation
1	Kaya–Iloilo (C)	9	7	1	1	42	6	+36	22	Qualification for Knockout Tournament
2	Far Eastern University	9	7	1	1	39	5	+34	22	Qualification for Knockout Tournament
3	Manila Digger	9	7	1	1	28	7	+21	22	Qualification for Knockout Tournament
4	De La Salle University	9	6	1	2	31	12	+19	19	Qualification for Knockout Tournament
5	Tuloy	9	5	0	4	34	20	+14	15	
6	Manila Nomads	9	3	2	4	15	22	−7	11	
7	University of the Philippines	9	3	1	5	9	25	−16	10	
8	University of Santo Tomas	9	2	1	6	16	26	−10	7	
9	Azzurri	9	1	0	8	6	38	−32	3	
10	Stallion Laguna	9	0	0	9	3	62	−59	0	

Updated to match(es) played on September 16, 2023. Source: PFFWL
Rules for classification: 1) Points; 2) Goal Difference; 3) Goals scored
(C) Champions

== Positions by round ==
Team ╲ Round	1	2	3	4	5	6	7	8	9
Azzurri	9	8	9	9	9	9	9	9	9
De La Salle University	1	2	3	5	4	4	4	3	4
Far Eastern University	3	4	4	2	2	1	1	1	2
Kaya–Iloilo	3	5	5	4	3	3	3	2	1
Manila Digger	5	3	2	1	1	2	2	3	3
Manila Nomads	7	6	6	6	6	6	6	6	6
Stallion Laguna	8	10	10	10	10	10	10	10	10
Tuloy	1	1	1	3	5	5	5	5	5
University of Santo Tomas	6	7	9	8	8	7	8	8	8
University of the Philippines	9	9	7	7	7	8	7	7	7

Updated to match(es) played on September 16, 2023. Source: PFFWL

== Results by round ==
Team ╲ Round	1	2	3	4	5	6	7	8	9
Azzurri	L	L	L	L	L	L	W	L	L
De La Salle University	W	W	D	L	W	W	L	W	W
Far Eastern University	W	D	W	W	W	W	L	W	W
Kaya–Iloilo	W	L	W	W	W	W	D	W	W
Manila Digger	W	W	W	W	W	L	D	W	W
Manila Nomads	L	D	W	L	W	D	W	L	L
Stallion Laguna	L	L	L	L	L	L	L	L	L
Tuloy	W	W	W	L	L	W	L	W	L
University of Santo Tomas	L	L	L	W	L	D	L	L	W
University of the Philippines	L	L	D	W	L	L	W	L	W

Updated to match(es) played on September 16, 2023. Source: PFFWL
W = Win; D = Draw; L = Loss

== Results ==
Club/Team	AZR	DLS	FEU	KAY	MDG	NOM	STA	TLY	UST	UPD
Azzurri	—		0–5	1–8	0–3		4–0			
De La Salle University	7–0	—	2–2					2–6	4–1	5–0
Far Eastern University			—	4–0		10–0	9–0		3–1	
Kaya–Iloilo		2–1		—	0–0	4–0	15–0		5–0	
Manila Digger		1–5	1–0		—	5–1	8–0			5–0
Manila Nomads	3–0	0–1				—		2–0	1–1	1–1
Stallion Laguna		0–4				0–7	—	1–6		0–4
Tuloy	7–0		1–5	0–4	1–4			—		
University of Santo Tomas	4–1				0–1		5–2	2–6	—	
University of the Philippines	1–0		0–1	0–4				0–7	3–2	—

Updated to match(es) played on September 16, 2023. Source: PFFWL
Legend: Blue = left column team win; Yellow = draw; Red = top row team win.

== Knockout rounds ==
The top four teams from the single round robin qualified and are seeded for the Knockout Semifinals. The 2nd and 3rd ranked teams are seeded in the first semifinals while the 1st and 4th ranked teams were seeded in the second semifinals.

=== Bracket ===
Semi-finals
1	Kaya	2
4	De La Salle University	1
2	Far Eastern University	0 (4)
3	Manila Digger	0 (5)

Final
1	Kaya	1
3	Manila Digger	0
Third place
4	De La Salle University	1
2	Far Eastern University	2

=== Semi-finals ===
27 September 2023
19:00 (UTC+8)

Far Eastern University	0–0 (a.e.t.)	Manila Digger
	Report
Penalties
Janly Fontamillas (penalty missed); Erma Balacua (penalty scored); Dionesa Tolentin (penalty scored); Jonela Albino (penalty scored); Kyla Marie Doctora (penalty missed)	3–4	(penalty scored) Roselle Marie Lecera; (penalty scored) Mea Bernal; (penalty missed) Karen Mae Alora; (penalty scored) Princess Caparida; (penalty scored) Hannah Faith Pachejo

Rizal Memorial Stadium, Manila
Referee: Jesus Abogado (Philippines)
7 October 2023
18:00 (UTC+8)

Kaya	2–1	De La Salle University
Cadag 49'; Lustan 65' (pen.)	Report	Teves 19'

Rizal Memorial Stadium, Manila
Referee: Krizmark Nañola (Philippines)

=== Third place ===
11 November 2023
16:00 (UTC+8)

De La Salle University	1–2	Far Eastern University
Teves 49' (pen.)		Altiche 34'; Tolentin 53'

Rizal Memorial Stadium, Manila
Referee: Chrismel Cayabyab (Philippines)

=== Finals ===
Kaya won through Sheen Nicole Ramores' lone goal in the 86th minute. Kaya became the first ever club team to win the PFF Women's League, with the last editions clinched by collegiate side De La Salle.

In mid-2024, Kaya would be invited to participate in the 2024–25 AFC Women's Champions League. They qualified directly for the group stage of the competition proper by virtue of the Philippines' member association rankings (7th).

11 November 2023
19:00 (UTC+8)

Kaya	1–0	Manila Digger
Ramores 86'

Rizal Memorial Stadium, Manila
Referee: Jesus Abogado (Philippines)

== Season statistics ==
=== Scoring ===
==== Top goalscorers ====
As of November 11, 2023

Team eliminated / inactive for this round.

Rank	Player	Team	R1	R2	R3	R4	R5	R6	R7	R8	R9	SF	3P	F	Total
1	(Philippines) Isabella Bandoja	Tuloy	3	3	4	1		4		3	1				19
1	(Philippines) Angelica Teves	De La Salle University	5	4	2			1	2	2	1	1	1		19
3	(Philippines) Dionesa Tolentin	Far Eastern University	2	1	3	1	1	4			2		1		15
4	(Philippines) Shelah Mae Cadag	Kaya	1			1	1	1		4	2	1			11
4	(Ghana) Candida Quarshie	Manila Digger			2		5	1			2				10
6	(Philippines) Camille Rodriguez	Kaya			1		1	1			4				7
6	(Philippines) Hazel Lustan	Kaya	1		1			1		1	2	1			7
8	(Philippines) Alisha del Campo	De La Salle University					2	2		1					5
8	(Philippines) Regine Rebosura	Far Eastern University			1			1		2	1				5
8	(Philippines) Rocelle Lecera	Manila Digger	1		1	1					2				5

==== Own goals ====
As of November 11, 2023

Rank	Player	Club	Own goals
1	(Philippines) Sabrina Nierras	Stallion Laguna	1
1	(Philippines) Ricca Joyce Vibal	Stallion Laguna	1

=== Hat-tricks ===
As of November 11, 2023

Player	Club	Result	Against	Date
(Philippines) Isabella Bandoja	Tuloy	7–0 (A)	University of the Philippines	24 June 2023
(Philippines) Angelica Teves^{5}	De La Salle University	7–0 (H)	Azzurri	1 July 2023
(Philippines) Isabella Bandoja	Tuloy	6–1 (A)	Stallion Laguna	1 July 2023
(Philippines) Angelica Teves^{4}	De La Salle University	7–0 (H)	University of Santo Tomas	10 July 2023
(Philippines) Isabella Bandoja^{4}	Tuloy	6–2 (A)	University of Santo Tomas	15 July 2023
(Philippines) Dionesa Tolentin	Far Eastern University	5–1 (A)	Tuloy	22 July 2023
(Ghana) Candida Quarshie^{5}	Manila Digger	5–1 (H)	Manila Nomads	29 July 2023
(Philippines) Isabella Bandoja^{4}	Tuloy	6–2 (A)	De La Salle University	19 August 2023
(Philippines) Dionesa Tolentin^{4}	Far Eastern University	5–1 (H)	Stallion Laguna	19 August 2023
(Philippines) Shelah Mae Cadag^{4}	Kaya-Iloilo	8–1 (A)	Azzurri	3 September 2023
(Philippines) Isabella Bandoja	Tuloy	7–0 (H)	Azzurri	9 September 2023
(Philippines) Camille Rodriguez^{4}	Kaya-Iloilo	15–0 (H)	Stallion Laguna	16 September 2023

Note

(H) – Home; (A) – Away

^{4} Player scored four goals
^{5} Player scored five goals

=== Clean sheets ===
As of November 11, 2023

Rank	Player	Club	Goals
1	(Philippines) Kyla Regalado	Manila Digger	4
1	(Philippines) Yasmin Elauria	Far Eastern University	4
3	(Philippines) Jessica Pido	De La Salle University	3
3	(Ghana) Ayishatu Simpson	Manila Digger	3
3	(Philippines) Inna Palacios	Kaya–Iloilo	3
6	(Philippines) Mykaella Abeto	Tuloy	2
6	(Philippines) Hazel Romina Arce	Manila Nomads	2
6	(Philippines) Khryss Dacanay	Kaya–Iloilo	2
6	(Philippines) Eunice Roxanne Eduave	University of the Philippines	2
6	(Philippines) Jessa May Lehayan	Far Eastern University	2

Season Statistics includes knockout rounds.

== Awards ==
The following awards were given at the conclusion of the tournament.

Award	Winner	Club
Most Valuable Player	(Philippines) Shelah Mae Cadag	Kaya–Iloilo
Golden Boot	(Philippines) Isabella Bandoja	Tuloy
Golden Boot	(Philippines) Angelica Teves	De La Salle University
Best Goalkeeper	(Ghana) Ayishatu Simpson	Manila Digger
Best Defender	(Philippines) Jonella Albino	Far Eastern University
Best Midfielder	(Philippines) Charisa Lemoran	Kaya–Iloilo
Fairplay Award	Manila Nomads	
