= Sharmine Siaotong =

Filipino footballer

Personal information
- Date of birth: 9 November 1994 (age 31)
- Position: Midfielder

College career
Years	Team	Apps	(Gls)
–2016	Far Eastern University		

Senior career*
Years	Team	Apps	(Gls)
2016–2017	OutKast		

International career
- Philippines
- * Club domestic league appearances and goals

Sharmine Siaotong (born 9 November 1994) is a Filipino women's international footballer who plays as a midfielder. She is a member of the Philippines women's national football team. She was part of the team at the 2015 AFF Women's Championship. On club level she played for Far Eastern University (FEU) scoring a goal against Hong Kong at the 2015 Ho Chi Minh City International Women Football Tournament and for FEU Lady Tamaraws in Philippines and scored one goal at the UAAP Season 78 football tournaments in 2016.

After graduating from FEU in 2016, Siaotong joined OutKast F.C. which participated in the PFF Women's League.
