= UAAP Season 85 football tournaments =

Philippine college football tournament

UAAP Season 85 Football
- Rise as One
Men's Finals	G1	Wins
FEU Tamaraws	4	1
Ateneo Blue Eagles	1	0
- Arena(s): Rizal Memorial Stadium
- Finals MVP: Viejay Frigillano
- Winning coach: Vince Santos
- Semifinalists: De La Salle Green Archers; UST Growling Tigers
Women's Finals	G1	Wins
FEU Lady Tamaraws	2	1
De La Salle Lady Archers	1	0
- Arena(s): Rizal Memorial Stadium
- Finals MVP: Katrina Magbitang
- Winning coach: Let Dimzon
Juniors' Finals	G1	Wins
FEU–D Baby Tamaraws	2	1
Zobel Junior Archers	0	0
- Arena(s): UP Diliman Football Stadium
- Finals MVP: Edgar Aban, Jr.
- Winning coach: Vince Santos

The UAAP Season 85 collegiate division football tournament started on February 19, 2023, while the high school division started on January 22, 2023. Both the collegiate and high school division are played at the UP Diliman Football Stadium in Quezon City. The collegiate finals are played at the Rizal Memorial Stadium

== Tournament format ==
The UAAP continued to use the UAAP Final Four format for the Men's Division. A double round-robin elimination round format with a knockout Final Four if no team sweeps the elimination round and a stepladder format if a team sweeps the elimination round. The High School and Women's divisions will also feature a double round-robin elimination round with the top two teams proceeding to the finals.

== Men's tournament ==
=== Elimination round ===
==== Team standings ====
Pos	Team	Pld	W	D	L	GF	GA	GD	Pts	Qualification
1	Ateneo Blue Eagles	12	6	3	3	11	9	+2	21	Qualification for semifinals
2	De La Salle Green Booters	12	6	3	3	18	17	+1	21	Qualification for semifinals
3	FEU Tamaraws	12	5	5	2	26	9	+17	20	Qualification for semifinals
4	UST Golden Booters	12	5	2	5	14	12	+2	17	Qualification for semifinals
5	UP Fighting Maroons	12	3	7	2	12	9	+3	16	
6	UE Red Warriors	12	4	4	4	18	22	−4	16	
7	Adamson Soaring Falcons	12	0	2	10	5	26	−21	2	

Source: The UAAP

==== Match-up results ====
	Round 1						Round 2					
Team ╲ Game	1	2	3	4	5	6	7	8	9	10	11	12
Adamson	UP school colors	UE school colors	La Salle school colors	FEU school colors	Ateneo school colors	UST school colors	FEU school colors	Ateneo school colors	UST school colors	UP school colors	La Salle school colors	UE school colors
Ateneo	UP school colors	UST school colors	UE school colors	Adamson school colors	FEU school colors	La Salle school colors	UP school colors	Adamson school colors	FEU school colors	UST school colors	UE school colors	La Salle school colors
La Salle	UE school colors	FEU school colors	Adamson school colors	UST school colors	UP school colors	Ateneo school colors	UST school colors	UE school colors	UP school colors	FEU school colors	Adamson school colors	Ateneo school colors
FEU	UST school colors	UE school colors	La Salle school colors	UP school colors	Adamson school colors	Ateneo school colors	Adamson school colors	Ateneo school colors	UE school colors	La Salle school colors	UST school colors	UP school colors
UST	FEU school colors	Ateneo school colors	UP school colors	La Salle school colors	UE school colors	Adamson school colors	La Salle school colors	Adamson school colors	UP school colors	UE school colors	Ateneo school colors	FEU school colors
UP	Adamson school colors	Ateneo school colors	UST school colors	FEU school colors	UE school colors	La Salle school colors	Ateneo school colors	UE school colors	UST school colors	Adamson school colors	La Salle school colors	FEU school colors
UE	La Salle school colors	FEU school colors	Adamson school colors	Ateneo school colors	UP school colors	UST school colors	La Salle school colors	UP school colors	FEU school colors	UST school colors	Ateneo school colors	Adamson school colors

Source: The UAAP
= Win; = Draw; = Loss

==== Results ====
School	AdU	AdMU	DLSU	FEU	UE	UP	UST
Adamson Soaring Falcons	—	0–1	0–3	1–6	1–3	0–3	0–1
Ateneo Blue Eagles	3–2	—	1–2	1–0	1–1	1–0	0–2
De La Salle Green Archers	2–1	1–1	—	1–2	1–5	0–0	2–0
FEU Tamaraws	0–0	0–1	3–0	—	1–1	1–1	2–0
UE Red Warriors	0–0	0–1	1–2	0–8	—	2–2	2–1
UP Fighting Maroons	1–0	0–0	1–1	2–2	1–2	—	0–0
UST Growling Tigers	3–0	1–0	2–3	1–1	3–1	0–1	—

Source: The UAAP
Legend: Blue = left column team win; Yellow = draw; Red = top row team win.

==== Playoffs ====
Semifinals (Knockout)
May 11
1	Ateneo	2
4	UST	0
May 11
2	La Salle	0
3	FEU	2

Finals (Knockout)
May 18
1	Ateneo	1
3	FEU	4

==== Semifinals ====
May 11, 2023
16:30

De La Salle Green Booters	0–2	FEU Tamaraws
		Gio Pabualan 27'; Sherwin Basindanan 86'

Rizal Memorial Stadium, Manila
May 11, 2023
18:30

Ateneo Blue Eagles	2–0	UST Golden Booters
Kofi Agyei 45+1'; Galen Fernandez 53'

Rizal Memorial Stadium, Manila

==== Final ====
May 18, 2023
17:00

Ateneo Blue Eagles	1–4	FEU Tamaraws
Galen Fernandez 53'		Karl Absalon 12'; Gerald Estores 30'; Gio Pabualan 30'; Bernardo Closa 90+4' (o.g.)

Rizal Memorial Stadium, Manila

==== Awards ====
UAAP Season 85 men's football champions
FEU Tamaraws
11th title

- Most Valuable Player: Viejay Frigillano (FEU Tamaraws)
- Rookie of the Year: Karl Absalon (FEU Tamaraws)
- Best Striker: Gio Pabualan (FEU Tamaraws)
- Best Midfielder: Gio Pabualan (FEU Tamaraws)
- Best Defender: Ildefonso Escobin (Ateneo Blue Eagles)
- Best Goalkeeper: Artuz Cezar (Ateneo Blue Eagles)
- Fair Play Award: UE Red Warriors

== Women's tournament ==
=== Elimination round ===
==== Team standings ====
Pos	Team	Pld	W	D	L	GF	GA	GD	Pts	Qualification
1	FEU Lady Tamaraws	8	6	1	1	17	5	+12	19	Qualification for finals
2	De La Salle Lady Archers	8	4	2	2	19	6	+13	14 (Note: Second-seed playoff: La Salle 1–0 UP)	Qualification for finals
3	UP Fighting Maroons	8	4	2	2	8	4	+4	14	
4	UST Growling Tigresses	8	3	1	4	8	18	−10	10	
5	Ateneo Blue Eagles	8	0	0	8	1	20	−19	0	

Source: The UAAP

==== Match-up results ====
	Round 1				Round 2			
Team ╲ Game	1	2	3	4	5	6	7	8
FEU	Ateneo school colors	UST school colors	UP school colors	La Salle school colors	UST school colors	Ateneo school colors	UP school colors	La Salle school colors
La Salle	UST school colors	UP school colors	Ateneo school colors	FEU school colors	UST school colors	Ateneo school colors	UP school colors	FEU school colors
UP	UST school colors	Ateneo school colors	La Salle school colors	FEU school colors	Ateneo school colors	La Salle school colors	FEU school colors	UST school colors
UST	UP school colors	La Salle school colors	FEU school colors	Ateneo school colors	La Salle school colors	FEU school colors	Ateneo school colors	UP school colors
Ateneo	FEU school colors	UP school colors	La Salle school colors	UST school colors	UP school colors	La Salle school colors	FEU school colors	UST school colors

Source: The UAAP
= Win; = Draw; = Loss

==== Results ====
School	AdMU	DLSU	FEU	UP	UST
Ateneo Blue Eagles	—	0–3	0–1	0–2	0–2
De La Salle Lady Archers	4–0	—	3–2	0–1	0–1
FEU Lady Tamaraws	4–0	1–1	—	1–0	3–0
UP Fighting Maroons	1–0	1–1	0–1	—	1–1
UST Growling Tigresses	1–3	0–7	1–4	0–2	—

Source: The UAAP
Legend: Blue = left column team win; Yellow = draw; Red = top row team win.

=== Playoff ===
May 13, 2023
17:00

De La Salle Lady Archers	1–0	UP Fighting Maroons
Angelica Teves 25' (pen.)

UP Diliman Football Stadium

=== Final ===
May 21, 2023
17:00

FEU Lady Tamaraws	2–1 (a.e.t.)	De La Salle Lady Archers
Regine Rebosura 46', 118'		Shai del Campo 90+10'

Rizal Memorial Stadium, Manila

==== Awards ====
UAAP Season 85 women's football champions
FEU Lady Tamaraws
11th title

- Most Valuable Player: Katrina Magbitang (FEU Lady Tamaraws)
- Rookie of the Year: Regine Rebosura (FEU Lady Tamaraws)
- Best Striker: Angelica Teves (De La Salle Lady Archers)
- Best Midfielder: Regine Rebosura (FEU Lady Tamaraws)
- Best Defender: Jennifer Baroin (UP Lady Maroons)
- Best Goalkeeper: Frances Acelo (UP Lady Maroons)
- Fair Play Award: Ateneo Blue Eagles

== Boys' tournament ==
=== Elimination round ===
==== Team standings ====
Pos	Team	Pld	W	D	L	GF	GA	GD	Pts	Qualification
1	FEU Tamaraws	6	5	1	0	19	3	+16	16	Qualification for finals
2	De La Salle Green Archers	6	4	1	1	13	7	+6	13	Qualification for finals
3	UST Growling Tigers	6	1	1	4	8	9	−1	4	
4	Ateneo Blue Eagles	6	0	1	5	3	24	−21	1	

Source: The UAAP

==== Match-up results ====
	Round 1			Round 2		
Team ╲ Game	1	2	3	4	5	6
FEU	Ateneo school colors	UST school colors	La Salle school colors	Ateneo school colors	UST school colors	La Salle school colors
DLSZ	UST school colors	Ateneo school colors	FEU school colors	UST school colors	Ateneo school colors	FEU school colors
UST	La Salle school colors	FEU school colors	Ateneo school colors	La Salle school colors	FEU school colors	Ateneo school colors
Ateneo	FEU school colors	La Salle school colors	UST school colors	FEU school colors	La Salle school colors	UST school colors

Source: The UAAP
= Win; = Draw; = Loss

==== Results ====
School	AdMU	DLSZ	FEU	UST
Ateneo Blue Eagles	—	2–4	0–5	1–6
Zobel Junior Archers	3–0	—	1–3	1–0
FEU–D Baby Tamaraws	6–0	1–1	—	2–1
UST Tiger Cubs	0–0	1–3	0–2	—

Source: The UAAP
Legend: Blue = left column team win; Yellow = draw; Red = top row team win.

=== Final ===
March 2, 2023
15:30

FEU–D Baby Tamaraws	2–1 (a.e.t.)	Zobel Junior Archers
Ronmer Paciente 90+8', 128'		Umi Abelarde 8'

UP Diliman Football Stadium

==== Awards ====
UAAP Season 85 boys' football champions
FEU–D Baby Tamaraws
11th title, 11th consecutive title

- Most Valuable Player: Edgar Aban, Jr. (FEU–D Baby Tamaraws)
- Rookie of the Year: Justin Concepcion (Zobel Junior Archers)
- Best Striker: Selwyn Mamon (FEU–D Baby Tamaraws)
- Best Midfielder: Jian Caraig (Zobel Junior Archers)
- Best Defender: Bryan Villanueva (FEU–D Baby Tamaraws)
- Best Goalkeeper: Borg Conopio (FEU–D Baby Tamaraws)
- Fair Play Award: Ateneo Blue Eagles

== See also ==
- UAAP Season 85
