= Alesa Dolino =

Filipino footballer (born 1992)

Personal information
- Full name: Alesa Nazareno Dolino
- Date of birth: 26 October 1992 (age 34)
- Place of birth: San Carlos, Negros Occidental, Philippines
- Position: Defender

College career
Years	Team	Apps	(Gls)
–2016	Far Eastern University		

Senior career*
Years	Team	Apps	(Gls)
2016–2017	OutKast F.C.		

International career
	Philippines	36	(0)
- * Club domestic league appearances and goals

Alesa Nazareno Dolino (born 26 October 1992) is a Filipino women's international footballer who plays as a defender. She is a member of the Philippines women's national football team. She was part of the team at the 2015 AFF Women's Championship and 2016 AFF Women's Championship. She played for the collegiate team of the Far Eastern University (FEU) in Philippines. With FEU she won the 2015 PFF Women's Cup and scored two goals including one at the final and became the best player overall and Best Defender/MVP of the championships.

After graduating from FEU in 2016, Dolino joined OutKast F.C. which participated in the inaugural season of the PFF Women's League.

Dolino was also part of the Philippines' 2018 AFC Women's Asian Cup squad.

== International goals ==
No.	Date	Venue	Opponent	Score	Result	Competition
1.	5 April 2017	Pamir Stadium, Dushanbe, Tajikistan	Iraq	4–0	4–0	2018 AFC Women's Asian Cup qualification
2.	3 August 2018	PFF National Training Centre, Carmona, Philippines	Macau	2–0	11–0	Friendly

== Awards ==
- 2015 PFF Women's Cup - Best player
- 2015 PFF Women's Cup - Best Defender/MVP
