= Jennizel Cabalan =

Filipino footballer

Personal information
- Date of birth: 6 September 1994 (age 32)
- Position: Midfielder

College career
Years	Team	Apps	(Gls)
- University of Santo Tomas

Senior career*
Years	Team	Apps	(Gls)
2016–2017	OutKast F.C.		

International career
- Philippines
- * Club domestic league appearances and goals

Jennizel Cabalan (born 6 September 1994) is a Filipino women's international footballer who plays as a midfielder. She is a member of the Philippines women's national football team. She was part of the team at the 2015 AFF Women's Championship. On the collegiate level she played for the University of Santo Tomas and scored 3 goals at the UAAP Season 78 football tournaments in 2016. She was also part of the UST team that participated in the 2015 PFF Women's Cup scoring three goals.

Cabalan joined OutKast F.C. which participated in the inaugural season of the PFF Women's League.
