= Marianne Narciso =

Filipino footballer

Personal information
- Date of birth: 8 August 1991 (age 35)
- Position: Forward

College career
Years	Team	Apps	(Gls)
- University of Santo Tomas

Senior career*
Years	Team	Apps	(Gls)
- Green Archers United

International career
- Philippines
- * Club domestic league appearances and goals

Marianne Narciso (born 8 August 1991) is a Filipino women's international footballer who plays as a forward. She is a member of the Philippines women's national football team. She was part of the team at the 2015 AFF Women's Championship. On club level she played for Green Archers United scoring three goals at the 2015 PFF Women's Cup against University of the Philippines-Y and on the collegiate level for the UST Lady Booters in Philippines.
