= UAAP Season 78 football tournaments =

Philippine college football tournament

UAAP Season 78 Football
- Host school: University of the Philippines
Men's Finals	G1	Wins
UP Fighting Maroons	4	1
Ateneo Blue Eagles	1	0
- Arena(s): Rizal Memorial Stadium
- Finals MVP: Kintaro Miyagi
- Winning coach: Anto Gonzales
- Semifinalists: De La Salle Green Archers; UST Growling Tigers
- TV network(s): ABS-CBN Sports+Action
Women's Finals	G1	Wins
De La Salle Lady Archers	1	0
UP Lady Maroons	2	1
- Arena(s): Rizal Memorial Stadium
- Finals MVP: BG Sta. Clara
- Winning coach: Anto Gonzales
- TV network(s): ABS-CBN Sports+Action
Juniors' Finals	G1	Wins
FEU–D Baby Tamaraws	6	1
Ateneo Blue Eaglets	1	0
- Duration: February 7, 2016

The UAAP Season 78 seniors division football tournament started on February 7, 2016, following the shift in the start of the league. The tournament opened at Emperador McKinley Hill Stadium in Fort Bonifacio, Taguig City. Other games were held at the Moro Lorenzo Football Field of Ateneo de Manila University in Katipunan Ave., Loyola Heights, Quezon City. Ateneo was the tournament host.

The men's and women's Final matches happened on May 5, 2016, which is exactly eight months after the start of the Season last September 5, 2015. The championship games also served as the last ones for the Season, making football the final event.

== Men's tournament ==
=== Elimination round ===
==== Team standings ====
Pos	Team	Pld	W	D	L	GF	GA	GD	Pts	Qualification
1	UP Fighting Maroons	14	9	3	2	16	5	+11	30	Semifinals
2	De La Salle Green Archers	14	9	2	3	26	10	+16	29	Semifinals
3	Ateneo Blue Eagles (H)	14	8	1	5	32	21	+11	25	Semifinals
4	UST Growling Tigers	14	7	4	3	21	21	0	25	Semifinals
5	FEU Tamaraws	14	7	3	4	28	10	+18	24	
6	NU Bulldogs	14	4	5	5	26	18	+8	17	
7	Adamson Soaring Falcons	14	1	2	11	3	42	−39	5	
8	UE Red Warriors	14	0	2	12	4	29	−25	2	

Source: ABS-CBN Sports
(H) Hosts

==== Match-up results ====
	Round 1							Round 2						
Team ╲ Game	1	2	3	4	5	6	7	8	9	10	11	12	13	14
AdU	UST school colors	NU school colors	Ateneo school colors	UE school colors	UP school colors	La Salle school colors	FEU school colors	NU school colors	Ateneo school colors	FEU school colors	UP school colors	UST school colors	La Salle school colors	UE school colors
AdMU	La Salle school colors	FEU school colors	Adamson school colors	UP school colors	NU school colors	UST school colors	UE school colors	UE school colors	Adamson school colors	UST school colors	UP school colors	FEU school colors	La Salle school colors	NU school colors
DLSU	Ateneo school colors	UP school colors	UST school colors	FEU school colors	UE school colors	Adamson school colors	NU school colors	FEU school colors	UP school colors	NU school colors	UE school colors	Ateneo school colors	Adamson school colors	UST school colors
FEU	UP school colors	Ateneo school colors	NU school colors	La Salle school colors	UST school colors	UE school colors	Adamson school colors	La Salle school colors	UST school colors	Adamson school colors	UE school colors	NU school colors	Ateneo school colors	UP school colors
NU	UE school colors	Adamson school colors	FEU school colors	UST school colors	Ateneo school colors	UP school colors	La Salle school colors	Adamson school colors	UE school colors	La Salle school colors	FEU school colors	UP school colors	UST school colors	Ateneo school colors
UE	NU school colors	UST school colors	UP school colors	Adamson school colors	La Salle school colors	FEU school colors	Ateneo school colors	Ateneo school colors	NU school colors	UP school colors	FEU school colors	La Salle school colors	UST school colors	Adamson school colors
UP	FEU school colors	La Salle school colors	UE school colors	Ateneo school colors	Adamson school colors	NU school colors	UST school colors	UST school colors	La Salle school colors	UE school colors	Adamson school colors	Ateneo school colors	NU school colors	FEU school colors
UST	Adamson school colors	UE school colors	La Salle school colors	NU school colors	FEU school colors	Ateneo school colors	UP school colors	UP school colors	FEU school colors	Ateneo school colors	Adamson school colors	NU school colors	UE school colors	La Salle school colors

= Win; = Draw; = Loss

=== Playoffs ===
==== Bracket ====
Semifinals
1	**UP**	**3**
4	UST	0
2	La Salle	1(4)
3	**Ateneo**	**1(5)**

Finals
1	**UP**	**4**
3	Ateneo	1

- **Bold** = winner
- * = after extra time, ( ) = penalty shootout score

==== Semifinals ====
April 28, 2016
1500

UP Fighting Maroons	3–0	UST Growling Tigers
Kyle Magdato 22'; Kintaro Miyagi 37'; Raphael Resuma 90+1'	Report

Rizal Memorial Stadium
April 28, 2016
1700

De La Salle Green Archers	1–1 (a.e.t.)	Ateneo Blue Eagles
Gelo Diamante 75'	Report	Carlo Liay 36'
Penalties
Jhoguev Ybañez (penalty scored); Darius Diamante (penalty scored); Jan Cruz (penalty scored); Gelo Diamante (penalty scored); Jose Montelibano (penalty missed)	4–5	Jeremiah Rocha (penalty scored); Julian Roxas (penalty scored); Mikko Mabanag (penalty scored); Paolo Gabriel Alilam (penalty scored); Carlo Liay (penalty scored)

Rizal Memorial Stadium

==== Finals ====
May 5, 2016
1500

UP Fighting Maroons	4–1	Ateneo Blue Eagles
Kintaro Miyagi 28' 70' 80'; Daniel Gadia 34'		Mikko Mabanag 36'

Rizal Memorial Stadium

=== Awards ===
UAAP Season 78 men's football champions
UP Fighting Maroons
17th title

- Most Valuable Player: Daniel Gadia (University of the Philippines)
- Rookie of the Year: Darius Diamante (De La Salle University)
- Best Striker: Paolo Salenga (National University), Jarvey Gayoso (Ateneo de Manila University)
- Best Midfielder: Paolo Bugas (Far Eastern University)
- Best Defender: Chy Villaseñor (Far Eastern University)
- Best Goalkeeper: Rafael de Guzman (De La Salle University)
- Fair Play Award: Ateneo de Manila University

=== Statistics ===
- Double Round Robin Statistics

==== Goal scorers ====
11 goals

- Jarvey Gayoso (Ateneo)
- Paolo Salenga (NU)

8 goals

- Gregory Norman Yang (La Salle)
- Rico Andes (FEU)
- Nico Macapal (NU)

7 goals

- Mashu Yoshioka (Ateneo)
- Ronald Batisla-ong (UST)

6 goals

- Val Jurao (FEU)
- David Angelo Diamante (La Salle)

4 goals

- Mikko Mabanag (Ateneo)
- Darwin Busimon (UST)

3 goals

- Julian Roxas (Ateneo)
- Darius Joseph Diamante (La Salle)
- Dave Deloso (FEU)
- Daniel Gadia (UP)
- Renz Gumban (UST)
- AJ Pasion (UST)

2 goals

- Jesuel Pilarca (Adamson)
- Emilio Acosta (Ateneo)
- Xavier Alcuaz (Ateneo)
- Christian Michael Castillo (Ateneo)
- Nicolas Ferrer (FEU)
- Eric Giganto (FEU)
- Paolo Bugas (FEU)
- Gerald Layumas (La Salle)
- Yoshi Koizumi (La Salle)
- Lawrence Colina (NU)
- Kintaro Miyagi (UP)

1 goal

- Bless Brian Jumo I (Adamson)
- Jeremiah Rocha (Ateneo)
- Mark Arranguez (FEU)
- Dominique Canonigo (FEU)
- Reymark Cubon (FEU)
- Audie Menzi (FEU)
- Michael Menzi (FEU)
- Jan Cruz (La Salle)
- Rigoberto Carlos Joseph (La Salle)
- Jose Montelibano (La Salle)
- Jhoguev Ybanez (La Salle)
- Marole Bungay (NU)
- Darwin Regala (NU)
- Chima Uzoka (NU)
- Patrick Valenzuela (NU)
- Marvin Viray (NU)
- Mar Vincent Diano (UE)
- Regil Galaura (UE)
- Khyndale Manzo (UE)
- Krysler Opena (UE)
- Vince Aguilar (UP)
- Feb Baya (UP)
- Jeremiah Borlongan (UP)
- Julian Clarino (UP)
- Kyle Magdato (UP)
- Carlos Monfort (UP)
- Nino Muros (UP)
- Rafael Patangan (UP)
- Raphael Resuma (UP)
- Marvin Bricenio (UST)
- Dionisio Busmion Jr (UST)
- John De Castro (UST)
- Jayson Rafols (UST)

own goal

- Jackson Ramos (Adamson)

==== Scoring ====
===== Overall =====
- Total number of goals scored: **156**
- Average goals per match: **2.79**
- Total number of braces: **19**
- Most number of Braces: **3**
  - Val Jurao
  - Jarvey Gayoso
- Total number of hat-tricks: **3**
- Most number of hat-tricks: **1**
  - Gregory Norman Yang
  - Paolo Salenga^{4}
  - Mashu Yoshioka
- Own goals scored: **1**
  - Jackson Ramos

===== Timing =====
- First goal of the tournament:
  - Gregory Norman Yang for De La Salle Green Archers against Ateneo Blue Eagles
- First brace of the tournament:
  - Nico Macapal for National University Bulldogs against University of the East Red Warriors
- First hat-trick of the tournament:
  - Gregory Norman Yang for De La Salle Green Archers against Adamson Falcons
- Fastest goal in a match from kickoff: **3rd minute**
  - Jeremiah Borlongan for UP Fighting Maroons against UST Growling Tigers
- Fastest brace of the tournament: **28th minute**
  - Darwin Busimon for UST Growling Tigers against UP Fighting Maroons
- Fastest hat-trick of the tournament: **64th minute**
  - Paolo Salenga for National University Bulldogs against Adamson Falcons

===== Teams =====
- Most goals scored by a team: **32**
  - Ateneo Blue Eagles
- Fewest goals scored by a team: **3**
  - Adamson Falcons
- Most goals conceded by a team: **42**
  - Adamson Falcons
- Fewest goals conceded by a team: **5**
  - UP Fighting Maroons
- Best goal difference: **+18**
  - FEU Tamaraws
- Worst goal difference: **-39**
  - Adamson Falcons
- Most goals scored in a match by both teams: **7**
  - FEU Tamaraws 5–2 Ateneo Blue Eagles
  - NU Bulldogs 7–0 Adamson Falcons
  - Ateneo Blue Eagles 7–0 Adamson Falcons
- Most goals scored in a match by one team: **7**
  - NU Bulldogs
  - Ateneo Blue Eagles
- Most goals scored in a match by the losing team: **2**
  - Ateneo Blue Eagles
  - UST Growling Tigers
  - National University Bulldogs
- Biggest margin of victory: **7**
  - NU Bulldogs
  - Ateneo Blue Eagles
- Most clean sheets achieved by a team: **11**
  - UP Fighting Maroons
- Fewest clean sheets achieved by a team: **2**
  - UE Red Warriors
  - Adamson Falcons
- Most consecutive clean sheets achieved by a team: **6**
  - FEU Tamaraws
  - UP Fighting Maroons
- Longest winning run: **6**
  - FEU Tamaraws
  - UP Fighting Maroons
- Longest unbeaten run: **8**
  - UST Growling Tigers
- Longest winless run: **14**
  - UE Red Warriors

== Women's tournament ==
=== Elimination round ===
==== Team standing ====
Pos	Team	Pld	W	D	L	GF	GA	GD	Pts	Qualification
1	De La Salle Lady Archers	8	6	2	0	23	8	+15	20	Finals
2	UP Lady Maroons	8	4	2	2	16	12	+4	14	Finals
3	Ateneo Lady Eagles (H)	8	3	0	5	13	15	−2	9	
4	FEU Lady Tamaraws	8	2	3	3	8	11	−3	9	
5	UST Growling Tigresses	8	1	1	6	10	24	−14	4	

Source: ABS-CBN Sports
(H) Hosts

==== Match-up results ====
	Round 1				Round 2			
Team ╲ Game	1	2	3	4	5	6	7	8
AdMU	La Salle school colors	UST school colors	UP school colors	FEU school colors	FEU school colors	La Salle school colors	UP school colors	UST school colors
DLSU	Ateneo school colors	FEU school colors	UST school colors	UP school colors	Ateneo school colors	UP school colors	UST school colors	FEU school colors
FEU	La Salle school colors	UST school colors	UP school colors	Ateneo school colors	Ateneo school colors	UP school colors	UST school colors	La Salle school colors
UP	UST school colors	Ateneo school colors	FEU school colors	La Salle school colors	UST school colors	FEU school colors	La Salle school colors	Ateneo school colors
UST	UP school colors	Ateneo school colors	FEU school colors	La Salle school colors	UP school colors	FEU school colors	La Salle school colors	Ateneo school colors

= Win; = Draw; = Loss

=== Playoffs ===
==== Finals ====
May 5, 2016
1500

De La Salle Lady Archers	1–2	UP Lady Maroons
Sara Castañeda 60' (pen.)		Cristina delos Reyes 50' (pen.); BG Sta. Clara 66'

Rizal Memorial Stadium

=== Awards ===
UAAP Season 78 women's football champions
UP Lady Maroons
First title

- Most Valuable Player: Monica Louise Manalansana (University of the Philippines)
- Rookie of the Year: Sara Castañeda (De La Salle University)
- Best Striker: Sara Castañeda (De La Salle University) & Shannon Arthur (De La Salle University)
- Best Midfielder: Sara Castañeda (De La Salle University)
- Best Defender: Regine Metillo (De La Salle University)
- Best Goalkeeper: Inna Palacios (De La Salle University)
- Fair Play Award: University of Santo Tomas

=== Statistics ===
==== Goal scorers ====
As of April 16, 2016

6 goals

- Sara Castañeda (La Salle)
- Shannon Arthur (La Salle)
- Kyla Inquig (La Salle)

5 goals

- Cam Rodriguez (Ateneo)

4 goals

- Jovelle Sudaria (FEU)
- Angeliza Sta. Clara (UP)

3 goals

- Cristina De los Reyes (UP)
- Kali Navea-Huff (UP)
- Mary Rose Obra (UP)
- Jennizel Cabalan (UST)
- Charisa Lemoran (UST)

2 goals

- Niña Acuña (UST)

1 goal

- Nona Amoncio (Ateneo)
- Tessa Bernardo (Ateneo)
- Fiona Faulkner (Ateneo)
- Bea Velasco (Ateneo)
- Kim Cupal (FEU)
- Marie Lecera (FEU)
- Sabrina Nierras (FEU)
- Sharmine Siaotong (FEU)
- Nicole Andaya (La Salle)
- Kyra Dimaandal (La Salle)
- Irish Navaja (La Salle)
- Cassandra Alleje (UP)
- Renee Dungca (UP)

own goal

- Nina Catedrilia (Ateneo)

==== Scoring ====
As of April 7, 2016

===== Overall =====
- Total number of goals scored: 57
- Average goals per match: 3.8
- Total number of braces: 6
- Most number of Braces: 2
  - Shannon Arthur
- Total number of hat-tricks: 1
- Most number of hat-tricks: 1
  - Kali Navea-Huff
- Own goals scored: 1
  - Nina Catedrilia

===== Timing =====
- First goal of the tournament:
  - Kyla Inquig for De La Salle Green Archers against Ateneo Blue Eagles
- First brace of the tournament:
  - Cam Rodriguez for Ateneo Blue Eagles against De La Salle Green Archers
- First hat-trick of the tournament:
  - Kali Navea-Huff for UP Fighting Maroons against UST Growling Tigers
- Fastest goal in a match from kickoff: 8th minute
  - Sara Castaneda for De La Salle Green Archers against UST Growling Tigers
- Fastest brace of the tournament: 35th minute
  - Jovelle Sudaria for FEU Tamaraws against UP Fighting Maroons
- Fastest hat-trick of the tournament: 68th minute
  - Kali Navea-Huff for UP Fighting Maroons against UST Growling Tigers

===== Teams =====
- Most goals scored by a team: 20
  - De La Salle Green Archers
- Fewest goals scored by a team: 7
  - FEU Tamaraws
- Most goals conceded by a team: 18
  - UST Growling Tigers
- Fewest goals conceded by a team: 6
  - De La Salle Green Archers
- Best goal difference: +14
  - De La Salle Green Archers
- Worst goal difference: -10
  - UST Growling Tigers
- Most goals scored in a match by both teams: 8
  - UP Fighting Maroons 5–3 UST Growling Tigers
- Most goals scored in a match by one team: 6
  - De La Salle Green Archers
- Most goals scored in a match by the losing team: 3
  - UST Growling Tigers
- Biggest margin of victory: 6
  - De La Salle Green Archers
- Most clean sheets achieved by a team: 3
  - De La Salle Green Archers
- Fewest clean sheets achieved by a team: 0
  - UST Growling Tigers
- Most consecutive clean sheets achieved by a team: 3
  - De La Salle Green Archers
- Longest winning run: 5
  - De La Salle Green Archers
- Longest unbeaten run: 7
  - De La Salle Green Archers
- Longest winless run: 3
  - FEU Tamaraws
  - UST Growling Tigers

== Juniors' tournament ==
=== Elimination round ===
==== Team standing ====
Pos	Team	Pld	W	D	L	GF	GA	GD	Pts	Qualification
1	FEU–D Baby Tamaraws	6	6	0	0	24	2	+22	18	Finals
2	Ateneo Blue Eaglets (H)	6	3	0	3	11	14	−3	9	Finals
3	Zobel Junior Archers	6	2	1	3	5	15	−10	7	Second-seed playoff
4	UST Tiger Cubs	6	0	1	5	0	9	−9	1	

Source: ABS-CBN Sports
(H) Hosts

==== Match-up results ====
	Round 1			Round 2		
Team ╲ Game	1	2	3	4	5	6
AdMU	La Salle school colors	UST school colors	FEU school colors	UST school colors	La Salle school colors	FEU school colors
DLSZ	Ateneo school colors	FEU school colors	UST school colors	FEU school colors	Ateneo school colors	UST school colors
FEU	UST school colors	La Salle school colors	Ateneo school colors	La Salle school colors	UST school colors	Ateneo school colors
UST	FEU school colors	Ateneo school colors	La Salle school colors	Ateneo school colors	FEU school colors	La Salle school colors

= Win; = Draw; = Loss

==== Scores ====
Results to the right and top of the gray cells are first round games, those to the left and below are second round games.

Team	ADMU	DLSZ	FEU	UST
Ateneo		3–0	0–6	2–0
La Salle	1–6		0–6	0–0
FEU	4–2	3–0		1–0
UST	0–1	0–1	0–4	

Legend: Blue = left column team win; Yellow = draw; Red = top row team win.

=== Playoffs ===
February 3, 2016

Zobel Junior Archers	1–1 (a.e.t.)	Ateneo Blue Eaglets
Penalties
	2–3

=== Final ===
February 7, 2016

FEU–D Baby Tamaraws	6–1	Ateneo Blue Eaglets
Christian Bacara 5'; Darryl Aban 12'; Chester Gio Pabualan 38'; Kieth Absalon 75'; John Villaseñor 85'; Josh Abundo 89'		Miguel Roque 30'

Moro Lorenzo Football Field

=== Awards ===
UAAP Season 78 juniors' football champions
FEU–D Baby Tamaraws
Sixth title, sixth consecutive title

- Most Valuable Player: Kieth Absalon (Far Eastern University)
- Rookie of the Year: Roberto Ripoll (Far Eastern University)
- Best Striker: Chester Gio Pabualan (Far Eastern University)
- Best Midfielder: Chester Gio Pabualan (Far Eastern University)
- Best Defender: Roberto Ripoll (Far Eastern University)
- Best Goalkeeper: Gavin Rosario (Ateneo de Manila University)
- Fair Play Award: De La Salle-Zobel

== Overall championship points ==
=== Seniors' division ===
Team	Men	Women	Total
UP Fighting Maroons	15	15	30
Ateneo Blue Eagles	12	10	22
De La Salle Green Archers	10	12	22
FEU Tamaraws	6	8	14
UST Growling Tigers	8	6	14
NU Bulldogs	4	-	4
Adamson Soaring Falcons	2	-	2
UE Red Warriors	1	-	1

=== Juniors' division ===
Team	Boys'	Points
FEU–D Baby Tamaraws	15	15
Ateneo Blue Eaglets	12	12
Zobel Junior Archers	10	10
UST Tiger Cubs	8	8

Pts.	Ranking
15	Champion
12	2nd
10	3rd
8	4th
6	5th
4	6th
2	7th
1	8th
—	Did not join
WD	Withdrew

== See also ==
- UAAP Season 78
