= UAAP Season 70 football tournaments =

Philippine college football tournament

UAAP Football season 70 started with the tournament host Ateneo de Manila University playing against 2004 men's Football finalist University of the Philippines. The defending champions in the men's and women's divisions were University of Santo Tomas and Far Eastern University, respectively. This year marks the introduction of high school football in the UAAP as a demonstration sport. The initial participating schools are Ateneo de Manila University, De La Salle-Santiago Zobel School, University of Santo Tomas High School and FEU - Diliman.

== Men's tournament ==
=== Elimination round ===
Team	Pld	W	D	L	GD	Pts.
FEU Tamaraws	9	6	1	2	+9	19
Ateneo Blue Eagles	9	6	1	2	+7	19
UST Growling Tigers	9	4	2	3	+2	14
UP Fighting Maroons	9	3	4	2	+2	13
UE Red Warriors	9	2	0	6	-7	6
De La Salle Green Archers	9	1	1	7	-10	4

January 13

UP Fighting Maroons	0–2	Ateneo Blue Eagles

Ateneo Erenchun Field
January 13

UE Red Warriors	1–6	FEU Tamaraws

Ateneo Erenchun Field
January 13

UST Growling Tigers	2–1	De La Salle Green Archers

Ateneo Erenchun Field

January 17

FEU Tamaraws	2–4	UP Fighting Maroons

Ateneo Ocampo & Erenchun Fields
January 17

Ateneo Blue Eagles	4–0	De La Salle Green Archers

Ateneo Ocampo & Erenchun Fields
January 17

UST Growling Tigers	1–0	UST Growling Tigers

Ateneo Ocampo & Erenchun Fields

January 20

De La Salle Green Archers	0–1	FEU Tamaraws

Ateneo Erenchun Field
January 20

UE Red Warriors	2–1	UP Fighting Maroons

Ateneo Erenchun Field
January 20

UST Growling Tigers	1–2	Ateneo Blue Eagles

Ateneo Erenchun Field

January 23

Ateneo Blue Eagles	2–0	FEU Tamaraws

Ateneo Ocampo & Erenchun Fields
January 23

UP Fighting Maroons	1–0	UST Growling Tigers

Ateneo Ocampo & Erenchun Fields
January 23

De La Salle Green Archers	0–1	UE Red Warriors

Ateneo Ocampo & Erenchun Fields

January 27

De La Salle Green Archers	0–0	UP Fighting Maroons

Ateneo Erenchun Field
January 27

UST Growling Tigers	2–2	FEU Tamaraws

Ateneo Erenchun Field
January 27

Ateneo Blue Eagles	1–0	UE Red Warriors

Ateneo Erenchun Field
January 31

UE Red Warriors	2–3	FEU Tamaraws

Ateneo Erenchun Field
January 31

De La Salle Green Archers	1–4	Ateneo Blue Eagles

Ateneo Erenchun Field
January 31

UST Growling Tigers	0–0	UP Fighting Maroons

Ateneo Ocampo Field

February 3

De La Salle Green Archers	0–1	UST Growling Tigers

Ateneo Erenchun Field
February 3

UE Red Warriors	0–1	Ateneo Blue Eagles

Ateneo Erenchun Field
February 3

FEU Tamaraws	2–3	UP Fighting Maroons

Ateneo Erenchun Field

February 6

Ateneo Blue Eagles	1–3	UST Growling Tigers

Ateneo Erenchun Field
February 6

FEU Tamaraws	1–0	De La Salle Green Archers

Ateneo Erenchun Field
February 6

UE Red Warriors	1–2	UP Fighting Maroons

Ateneo Ocampo Field

February 10

FEU Tamaraws	1–0	UST Growling Tigers

Ateneo Erenchun Field
February 10

UE Red Warriors	vs.	De La Salle Green Archers

Ateneo Erenchun Field
February 10

Ateneo Blue Eagles	1–1	UP Fighting Maroons

Ateneo Erenchun Field

February 14

UST Growling Tigers	vs.	UE Red Warriors

Ateneo Erenchun Field
February 14

FEU Tamaraws	vs.	Ateneo Blue Eagles

Ateneo Erenchun Field
February 14

UP Fighting Maroons	vs.	De La Salle Green Archers

Ateneo Ocampo Field

== Women's tournament ==
=== Elimination round ===
Team	Pld	W	D	L	GD	Pts.
FEU Lady Tamaraws	8	5	1	2	+10	16
De La Salle Lady Archers	8	4	3	1	+6	15
UST Tigresses	8	4	2	2	+6	14
Ateneo Lady Eagles	8	3	2	3	+3	11
UP Lady Maroons	8	0	0	8	-22	0

FIRST ROUND OF ELIMINATIONS
January 13 - Ateneo Ocampo Field			January 16 - Ateneo Ocampo Field		
Time	Team	Goals	Time	Team	Goals
1 PM	De La Salle University	0	1 PM	Ateneo de Manila University	3
1 PM	University of Santo Tomas	0	1 PM	Far Eastern University	1
3 PM	University of the Philippines	0	3 PM	University of Santo Tomas	3
3 PM	Ateneo de Manila University	1	3 PM	University of the Philippines	0
January 20 - Ateneo Ocampo Field			January 24 - Ateneo Ocampo Field		
Time	Team	Goals	Time	Team	Goals
1 PM	De La Salle University	2	1 PM	Ateneo de Manila University	0
1 PM	University of the Philippines	0	1 PM	University of Santo Tomas	0
3 PM	Far Eastern University	2	3 PM	De La Salle University	0
3 PM	University of Santo Tomas	1	3 PM	Far Eastern University	0
January 27 - Ateneo Ocampo Field			BYE		
Time	Team	Goals			
1 PM	De La Salle University	0			
1 PM	Ateneo de Manila University	0			
3 PM	University of the Philippines	0			
3 PM	Far Eastern University	1			

SECOND ROUND OF ELIMINATIONS
January 30 - Ateneo Erenchun Field			February 3 - Ateneo Ocampo Field		
Time	Team	Goals	Time	Team	Goals
1 PM	De La Salle University	3	1 PM	Far Eastern University	1
1 PM	University of Santo Tomas	0	1 PM	De La Salle University	0
3 PM	Far Eastern University	5	3 PM	University of Santo Tomas	2
3 PM	University of the Philippines	0	3 PM	Ateneo de Manila University	1
February 7 - Ateneo Erenchun Field			January 24 - Ateneo Ocampo Field		
Time	Team	Goals	Time	Team	Goals
1 PM	Ateneo de Manila University	0	3 PM	Ateneo de Manila University	3
1 PM	Far Eastern University	1	3 PM	University of the Philippines	0
1 PM	De La Salle University	2	1 PM	University of Santo Tomas	2
1 PM	University of the Philippines	0	1 PM	Far Eastern University	0
February 13 - Ateneo Erenchun Field			BYE		
Time	Team	Goals			
1 PM	University of the Philippines				
1 PM	University of Santo Tomas				
3 PM	De La Salle University				
3 PM	Ateneo de Manila University				

== Juniors' Football ==
=== Current Standings ===
Qualified for Finals	Eliminated

Team	Win	Draw	Loss	TOTAL
De La Salle Junior Archers	3	0	0	9
Ateneo Blue Eaglets	2	0	1	6
FEU Baby Tamaraws	1	0	2	3
UST Tiger Cubs	0	0	3	0

FIRST ROUND OF ELIMINATIONS
January 12 - Ateneo Erenchun Field			January 19 - Ateneo Erenchun Field		
Time	Team	Goals	Time	Team	Goals
1 PM	De La Salle Zobel	12	1 PM	Ateneo de Manila University	9
1 PM	Far Eastern University - FERN	0	1 PM	Far Eastern University - FERN	1
3 PM	Ateneo de Manila University	7	3 PM	University of Santo Tomas	0
3 PM	University of Santo Tomas	0	3 PM	De La Salle Zobel	11
January 26 - Ateneo Erenchun Field			BYE		
Time	Team	Goals			
1 PM	De La Salle Zobel	2			
1 PM	Ateneo de Manila University	0			
3 PM	University of Santo Tomas	10000			
3 PM	Far Eastern University - FERN	-20			
