= UAAP football championships =

Football championship

UAAP Football Championship
- Country: Philippines
- Divisions: 3
- Number of clubs: 20; Men's: 7 Women's: 6 Boys': 7
- Current champions: Men's: University of the Philippines (Season 88); Women's: Far Eastern University (Season 89); Boys': Far Eastern University–Diliman (Season 88)
- Current: UAAP Season 89 football tournaments

The association football championships of the University Athletic Association of the Philippines (UAAP) are usually held during the second semester of the school year (December–April). However, starting with UAAP Season 87, the men's and women's collegiate tournaments were shifted to the first semester, with the boys' tournament remaining in the second semester.

== Tournament format ==
There are no recorded post season games during the early years of UAAP Men's Football. The format is primarily a single or double round robin format with the team getting the most points awarded as champions or co-champions as there are no tiebreaker rules at that time. The earliest known knockout rounds happened between University of the Philippines and University of Santo Tomas in Season 49.

Season 58 saw the addition of the women’s division. Both divisions play a double round-robin format, with the top two teams facing off in a one-game final to determine the champion.

Starting in Season 70, the UAAP introduced several changes to the format following the inclusion of the boys’ division as a demonstration sport. The UAAP retained the double round-robin elimination format, but if a team sweeps the elimination round, it is automatically awarded the championship. If no team sweeps the elimination round, the top two teams advance to the finals. A tie in points between the top two teams results in a best-of-three series; otherwise, the top seed enjoys a twice-to-beat advantage. The boys’ division became a permanent fixture in Season 72.

With the National University joining the men’s division in Season 75, the tournament adopted the Final Four format for the first time. The top two seeds earned a twice-to-beat advantage in the semifinals, while a tie for the second and/or fourth semifinal spot would be settled by a one-game playoff. The finals were played as a best-of-three series.

Another format change took place in Season 77, when Adamson University fielded a men’s team, marking the first time all UAAP member schools were represented in UAAP football. The league removed the twice-to-beat advantage. In the men’s division, the top four teams competed in single-match knockout semifinals, followed by a single-match final. In both the women’s and boys’ divisions, the top two teams faced off in a single-match championship.

Season 87 saw the first UAAP expansion in the boys' division with the inclusion of 2 guest teams, Claret School and PAREF-Southridge. This allowed the boys' division to adopt the same format as the men's division.

The men's and boys' division's current format starting Season 88 adopts a double round-robin elimination with the top 2 seeds earning a twice-to-beat advantage, any ties in points for the second and/or fourth semifinal spot would be settled by a one-game playoff. In the event that a team sweeps all the games during the eliminations, it will automatically qualify for the final. The second, third and fourth seeded teams will face each other in a step-ladder format. The winner will face the number one seeded team in the final. The finals is plays as a single game championship match.

The women's division adopts the same format starting season 89, marking the first time all division are using the same format, following the addition of National University in the women's division.

== List of champions ==
Boys' football was introduced as a demonstration sport in UAAP Season 70 (2007–08) and elevated to a regular sport in UAAP Season 72 (2009–10).

UAAP Season	Men's	Women's	Boys'
1 (1938–39)	University of Santo Tomas	No tournament	No tournament
2 (1939–40)	University of Santo Tomas	No tournament	No tournament
3 (1940–41)	University of Santo Tomas	No tournament	No tournament
4 (1941–42)	University of Santo Tomas; University of the Philippines Diliman	No tournament	No tournament
5 (1942–43)	Not held due to World War II.		
6 (1943–44)	Not held due to World War II.		
7 (1944–45)	Not held due to World War II.		
8 (1945–46)	Not held due to World War II.		
9 (1946–47)	Not held due to World War II.		
10 (1947–48)	University of Santo Tomas	No tournament	No tournament
11 (1948–49)	National University	No tournament	No tournament
12 (1949–50)	University of Santo Tomas	No tournament	No tournament
13 (1950–51)	University of Santo Tomas	No tournament	No tournament
14 (1951–52)	University of Santo Tomas; Far Eastern University	No tournament	No tournament
15 (1952–53)	Far Eastern University	No tournament	No tournament
16 (1953–54)	Far Eastern University	No tournament	No tournament
17 (1954–55)	University of Santo Tomas	No tournament	No tournament
18 (1955–56)	University of Santo Tomas	No tournament	No tournament
19 (1956–57)	Far Eastern University	No tournament	No tournament
20 (1957–58)	Far Eastern University	No tournament	No tournament
21 (1958–59)	University of Santo Tomas; University of the Philippines Diliman	No tournament	No tournament
22 (1959–60)	University of Santo Tomas	No tournament	No tournament
23 (1960–61)	University of Santo Tomas	No tournament	No tournament
24 (1961–62)	University of the East	No tournament	No tournament
25 (1962–63)	University of the East	No tournament	No tournament
26 (1963–64)	University of Santo Tomas	No tournament	No tournament
27 (1964–65)	University of Santo Tomas	No tournament	No tournament
28 (1965–66)	University of Santo Tomas	No tournament	No tournament
29 (1966–67)	University of Santo Tomas	No tournament	No tournament
30 (1967–68)	University of Santo Tomas	No tournament	No tournament
31 (1968–69)	University of Santo Tomas	No tournament	No tournament
32 (1969–70)	University of the East	No tournament	No tournament
33 (1970–71)	University of Santo Tomas	No tournament	No tournament
34 (1971–72)	Not held		
35 (1972–73)	Not held		
36 (1973–74)	University of Santo Tomas; University of the Philippines Diliman	No tournament	No tournament
37 (1974–75)	University of the Philippines Diliman	No tournament	No tournament
38 (1975–76)	University of Santo Tomas; University of the Philippines Diliman	No tournament	No tournament
39 (1976–77)	University of the Philippines Diliman	No tournament	No tournament
40 (1977–78)	University of the Philippines Diliman	No tournament	No tournament
41 (1978–79)	University of Santo Tomas	No tournament	No tournament
42 (1979–80)	University of Santo Tomas	No tournament	No tournament
43 (1980–81)	Far Eastern University	No tournament	No tournament
44 (1981–82)	University of Santo Tomas	No tournament	No tournament
45 (1982–83)	University of Santo Tomas; University of the Philippines Diliman	No tournament	No tournament
46 (1983–84)	University of the Philippines Diliman	No tournament	No tournament
47 (1984–85)	University of Santo Tomas	No tournament	No tournament
48 (1985–86)	University of Santo Tomas	No tournament	No tournament
49 (1986–87)	University of the Philippines Diliman	No tournament	No tournament
50 (1987–88)	University of Santo Tomas	No tournament	No tournament
51 (1988–89)	University of Santo Tomas	No tournament	No tournament
52 (1989–90)	University of the Philippines Diliman	No tournament	No tournament
53 (1990–91)	University of Santo Tomas; De La Salle University	No tournament	No tournament

demonstration sport

UAAP Season	Men's	Women's	Boys'
54 (1991–92)	De La Salle University; University of Santo Tomas		
55 (1992–93)	University of Santo Tomas		
56 (1993–94)	University of Santo Tomas		
57 (1994–95)	De La Salle University		
58 (1995–96)	Ateneo de Manila University	De La Salle University	
59 (1996–97)	De La Salle University	Far Eastern University	
60 (1997–98)	De La Salle University	Far Eastern University	
61 (1998–99)	Ateneo de Manila University	De La Salle University	
62 (1999–00)	University of Santo Tomas	De La Salle University	
63 (2000–01)	University of the Philippines Diliman	Far Eastern University	
64 (2001–02)	University of the Philippines Diliman	Far Eastern University	
65 (2002–03)	University of the East	De La Salle University	
66 (2003–04)	Ateneo de Manila University	De La Salle University	
67 (2004–05)	Ateneo de Manila University	De La Salle University	
68 (2005–06)	Ateneo de Manila University	De La Salle University	
69 (2006–07)	University of Santo Tomas	Far Eastern University	
70 (2007–08)	Far Eastern University	Far Eastern University	De La Salle Zobel
71 (2008–09)	University of the Philippines Diliman	University of Santo Tomas	Ateneo de Manila University
72 (2009–10)	Far Eastern University	De La Salle University	Ateneo de Manila University
73 (2010–11)	University of the Philippines Diliman	Far Eastern University	Far Eastern University–Diliman
74 (2011–12)	University of the Philippines Diliman	University of Santo Tomas	Far Eastern University–Diliman
75 (2012–13)	Ateneo de Manila University	Far Eastern University	Far Eastern University–Diliman
76 (2013–14)	Far Eastern University	Far Eastern University	Far Eastern University–Diliman
77 (2014–15)	Far Eastern University	Far Eastern University	Far Eastern University–Diliman
78 (2015–16)	University of the Philippines Diliman	University of the Philippines Diliman	Far Eastern University–Diliman
79 (2016–17)	Ateneo de Manila University	De La Salle University	Far Eastern University–Diliman
80 (2017–18)	University of the Philippines Diliman	De La Salle University	Far Eastern University–Diliman
81 (2018–19)	Ateneo de Manila University	De La Salle University	Far Eastern University–Diliman
82 (2019–20)	Discontinued due to COVID-19 pandemic		Far Eastern University–Diliman
83 (2020–21)	Cancelled due to COVID-19 pandemic		
84 (2021–22)	Not held due to COVID-19 pandemic		
85 (2022–23)	Far Eastern University	Far Eastern University	Far Eastern University–Diliman
86 (2023–24)	University of the Philippines Diliman	Far Eastern University	Far Eastern University–Diliman
87 (2024–25)	Far Eastern University	Far Eastern University	University of Santo Tomas
88 (2025–26)	University of the Philippines Diliman	Far Eastern University	Far Eastern University–Diliman
89 (2026–27)		Far Eastern University	

demonstration sport

Notes:

- De La Salle University and University of Santo Tomas were declared as co-champions in Season 54 after a fight broke out between both schools near the end of the match.

== Number of championships by school ==
University	Men's	Women's	Boys'	Total	Last Football Championship
Far Eastern University	12	15	13	40	2026–27 (women's division)
University of Santo Tomas	36	2	1	39	2024–25 (boy's division)
University of the Philippines Diliman	20	1	0	21	2025–26 (men's division)
De La Salle University	5	11	1	17	2018–19 (women's division)
Ateneo de Manila University	8	0	2	10	2018–19 (men's division)
University of the East	4	0	0	4	2002–03 (men's division)
National University	1	0	0	1	1948–49 (men's division)
Adamson University	0	0	0	0	none
Claret School of Quezon City	–	–	0	0	none
PAREF Southridge School	–	–	0	0	none

== Statistics ==
- Longest Championship Streak
  - Men's – University of Santo Tomas won six titles from season 26 to 31 (1963-1968)
  - Women's – Far Eastern University won five titles from Season 85 to 89 (2022–2026).
  - Boys' – Far Eastern University has won 12 titles from Season 73 to 86 (2010–2024, as no tournaments were held during Season 83 and 84 from 2020–2022).
- Double Crown/Double
  - Far Eastern University won its first "double crown" or "double" in Season 70 (2007–08), winning in the Men's and Women's Football competitions.
  - Far Eastern University won its second, third, fourth, and sixth double crowns in Season 73 (2010–11), Season 75 (2012–13), Season 86 (2023–24), and Season 88 (2025–26), winning in the Women's and Boys' Football competitions. Far Eastern University won its fifth double crown in Season 87 (2024-25), winning in the Men's and Women's Football competitions.
  - University of the Philippines won its first double crown in Season 78 (2015–16), winning in the Men's and Women's Football competitions.
- Triple Crown/Treble
  - Far Eastern University has won the coveted "triple crown" or "treble" three times, winning all three competitions back-to-back in Season 76 (2013–14) and Season 77 (2014–15), and again in Season 85 (2022–23).
- Most Finals Appearance
  - Men's – Ateneo de Manila University – 22 Times
  - Women's – Far Eastern University – 21 Times
- Most Finals Appearance for Two Teams
  - Men's – Ateneo de Manila University vs. University of Santo Tomas – 9 Times
  - Women's – De La Salle University vs. Far Eastern University – 9 Times
- Longest Finals Appearance
  - Men's – Ateneo de Manila University – 10 Years – Season 45 to Season 54 (1983–1992)
  - Women's – Far Eastern University – 20 Years – Season 47 to Season 66 (1985–2004)
- Longest Finals Appearance for Two Teams
  - Men's – Tied
    - Ateneo de Manila University vs. Far Eastern University – 5 Years – Season 45 to Season 49 (1983–1987)
    - Ateneo de Manila University vs. University of Santo Tomas – 5 Years – Season 50 to Season 54 (1988–1992)
  - Women's – De La Salle University vs. Far Eastern University – 9 Years – Season 58 to Season 66 (1996–2004)
- Ranking of the Team with the Most Finals Appearances Combined:
  - 1st – Ateneo de Manila University – 28 Times
  - 2nd – Far Eastern University – 27 Times
  - 3rd – University of Santo Tomas – 25 Times
  - 4th – De La Salle University – 17 Times
  - 5th – University of the Philippines – 14 Times
  - 6th – University of the East – 2 Times

== Rankings ==
Legend
Rank	Description
1	Champion
2	1st runner-up
3	2nd runner-up
4	4th-8th place
X	Suspended
	Did not join

Men's final rankings since UAAP Season 64 (2001–02). The numbers inside the boxes refer to the team's placement in the elimination rounds.

Team	UAAP Season																					
Team	64	65	66	67	68	69	70	71	72	73	74	75	76	77	78	79	80	81	85	86	87	88
Adamson Soaring Falcons														8	7	8	8	6	7	7	7	6
Ateneo Blue Eagles	3	2	1	1	1	4	2	6	4	6	5	1	7	4	3	1	2	1	1	4	1	5
De La Salle Green Booters	6	6	6	5	2	X	6	3	3	3	4	4	4	1	2	6	4	3	2	5	5	4
FEU Tamaraws	5	5	4	3	5	2	1	2	1	5	3	3	1	2	5	3	7	4	1	2	3	2
NU Bulldogs												6	6	5	6	5	6	7				
UE Red Warriors	4	1	5	4	6	5	5	5	5	4	6	7	5	7	8	7	5	8	6	6	6	7
UP Fighting Maroons	1	3	2	6	4	3	4	1	6	1	1	2	2	3	1	2	1	2	5	1	2	1
UST Golden Booters	2	4	3	2	3	1	3	4	2	2	2	5	3	6	4	4	3	5	4	3	4	3

== See also ==
- NCAA Philippines Football Championship
