= Futsal in the Philippines =

- Country: Philippines
- Governing body: Philippine Football Federation
- National teams: Men's national team Women's national team
- Nicknames: Indoor football, mini-football
- First played: June 1981 (official)

National competitions
- PFF Futsaliga

International competitions
- FIFA Futsal World Cup; FIFA Futsal Women's World Cup; ASEAN Futsal Championship; ASEAN Women's Futsal Championship; SEA Games; AFC Futsal Club Championship

Futsal in the Philippines is an emerging sport in the Philippines. Futsal as a variant of football is under the jurisdiction of the Philippine Football Federation.

== History ==
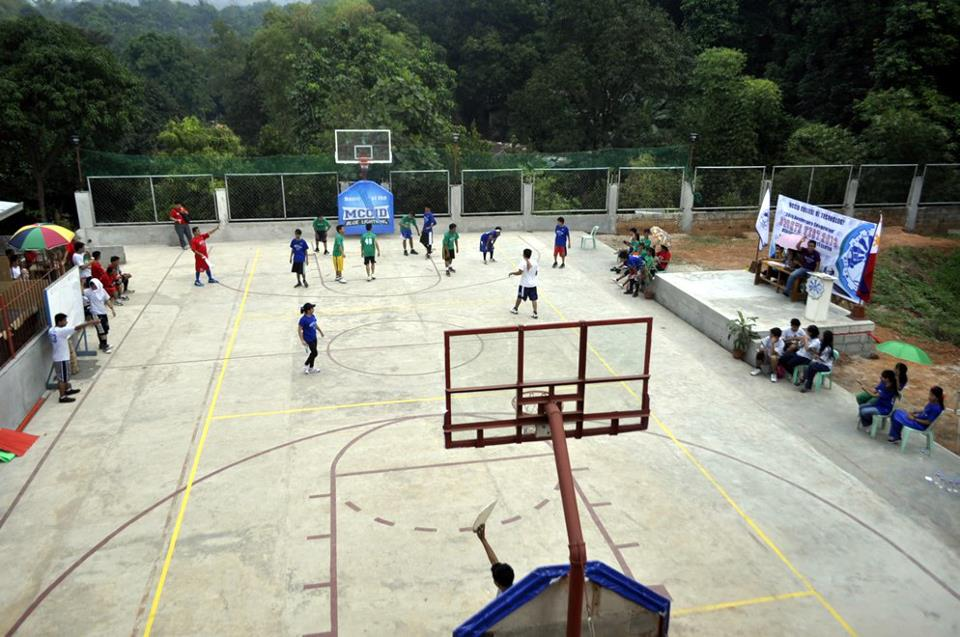
Youth playing basketball in a multi-purpose court which also allow play for volleyball and futsal.

=== Early years ===
An informal form of futsal has been played in the Philippines as early as the 1960s and 1980s, and it is usually played as part of a cross training for footballers during rainy weather using regular association football rules. It was then known as indoor football. Futsal was officially introduced to the Philippines, when the Philippine Football Federation (PFF) under the President Manuel Tinio along with the Gintong Alay program headed by Michael Keon, the San Miguel Corporation, and Adidas held a "mini football" exhibition match. The exhibition match was held in June 1981 at the Rizal Memorial Coliseum, which pitted teams named after Adidas' shoe models; Adidas Rom and Adidas Vienna. Vienna won 7–3 over Rom in a game described as having a faster pace than regular association football.

In 1983, the PFF under President Frank Elizalde held a mini football tournament known as the Adidas Mini-Soccer Invitationals which featured teams from San Miguel Corporation, Philippine Air Force, University of the Philippines Los Baños, University of the Philippines-Diliman, Ateneo de Manila and Philippine Navy at the Rizal Memorial Coliseum. It featured two rounds; a single round robin and championship round contested by the top four teams from the previous phase.

It was only in 1989, that the sport known as futsal was adopted by FIFA.

=== 2000s: Early years of Futsal under FIFA ===
The PFF's futsal program under the auspices of FIFA began in 2001 with the PFF General Secretary Christopher Monfort tapping the services of Joaquin Preysler to head the federation's futsal committee. At the 2007 Southeast Asian Games, the Philippine women's national futsal team clinched a bronze medal.

=== 2010s–2020s: PFL and grassroots ===
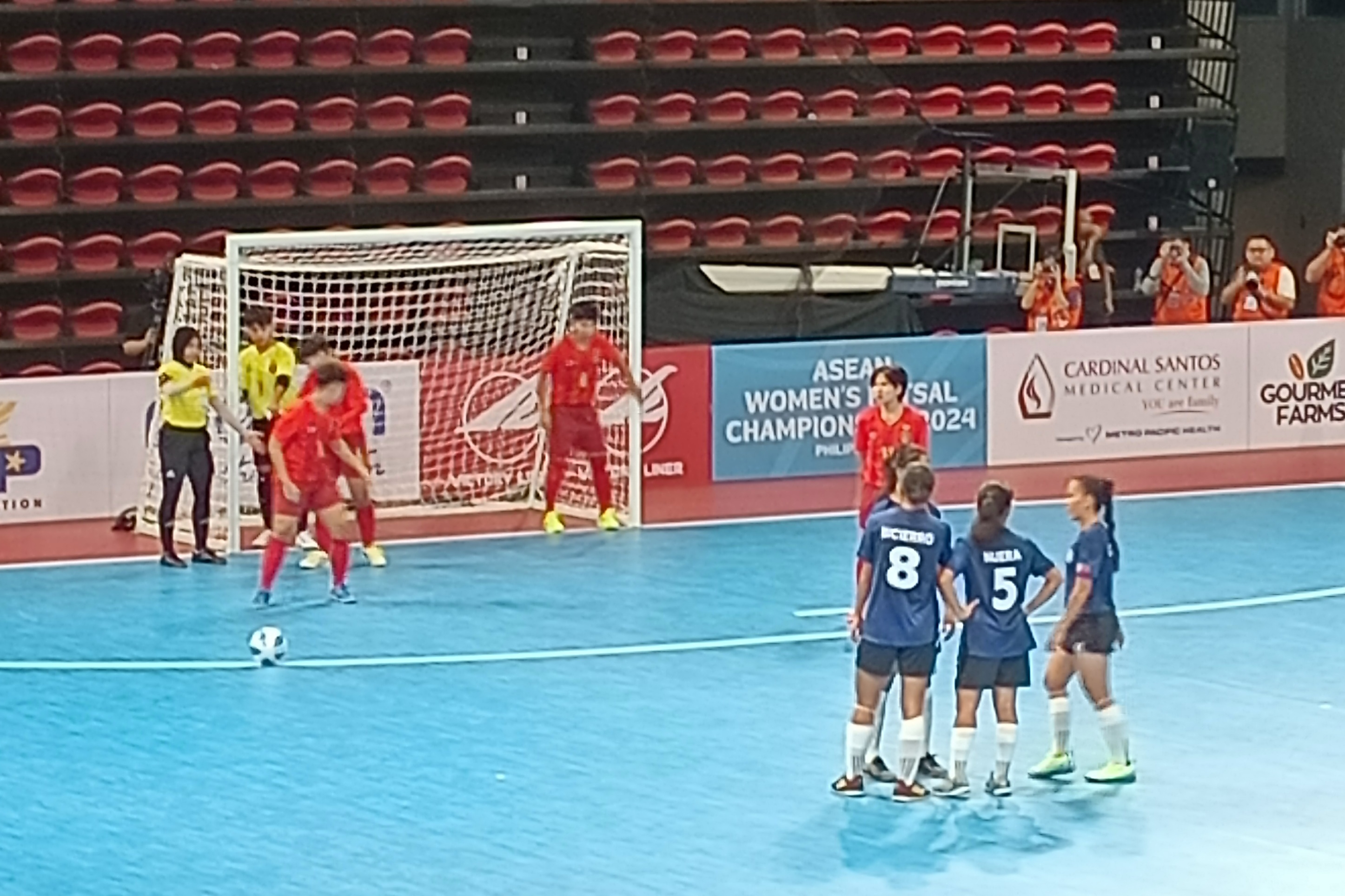
Philippines (blue) vs Myanmar (red) at the 2024 ASEAN Women's Futsal Championship

The Philippine Football Federation organized a futsal league from 2009 to 2016 which was known as the Philippine Futsal League, when its futsal committee was headed by Iranian coach, Esmaeil Sedigh.

The PFF has lobbied the inclusion of futsal in youth sports tournaments organized by the Philippine government. In 2016, the Department of Education included futsal as an official sport for girls competing in the secondary division of the Palarong Pambansa, a national multi-sports tournament for student athletes. In 2019, the education department named futsal as a demonstration event for the elementary division of the same games. In 2018, the Philippine Sports Commission reinclude futsal in the National Youth Games for U13 and U15 boys and girls.

In 2016, the Henry V. Moran Foundation began supporting the PFF futsal program. The foundation launched the Liga Eskwela Futsal program which aimed to the teach public school teachers the fundamentals of the sport. Allianz, is another private company known to organize its own youth futsal tournament, the National Youth Futsal Invitational which is for boys and girls ages 14 to 16.

In November 2020, the PFF announced that it has acquired the services of Dutch coach Vic Hermans who will serve as the league's consultant for its futsal program which is headed by Kevin Goco. The PFF planned to organize its own age-group futsal tournaments in late 2021 despite the ongoing COVID-19 pandemic prevailing at the time. Originally under the auspices of the PFF and The Henry V. Moran Foundation of Danny Moran, Hermans led the organization of the High 5 Futsal League in 2023.

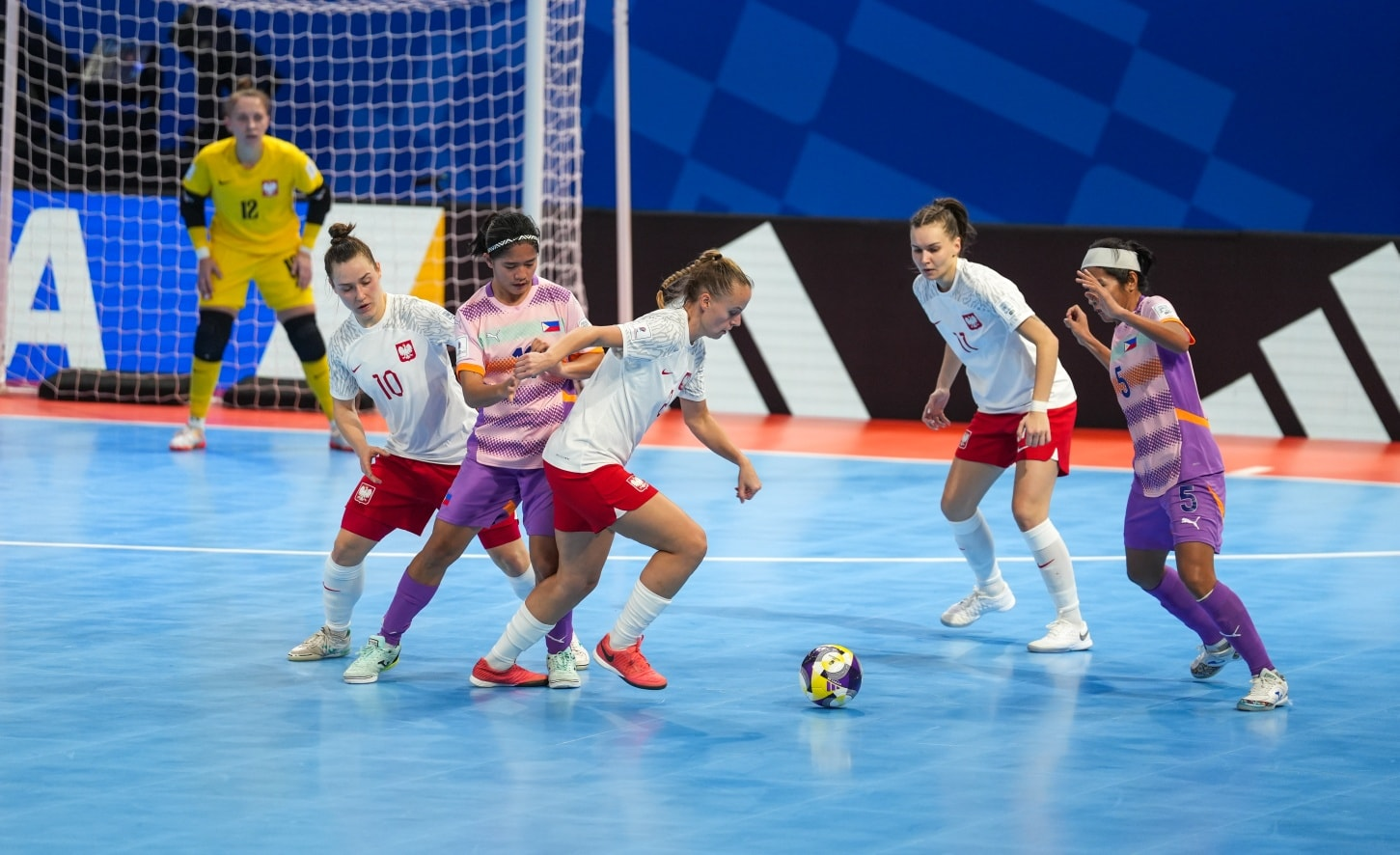
Philippines v Poland at the 2025 FIFA Futsal Women's World Cup

On May 15, 2024, the Philippines was awarded the hosting rights for the inaugural 2025 FIFA Futsal Women's World Cup Brazil won the inaugural tournament hosted at the Philsports Arena in Pasig.

The PFF launched the inaugural season of the PFF Futsaliga, its national domestic league, on February 28, 2026.

== League ==
The PFF Futsaliga serves as the national domestic futsal league of the Philippines. It has a men's, women's, under-17 boys and girls divisions. Launched in 2026, games are hosted at the Philsports Arena.

- Philippine Futsal League (2009–2016)
- High 5 Futsal League (2023–)
- PFF Futsaliga (2026–)

== See also ==
- Philippines women's national futsal team
- Philippines national futsal team
- Football in the Philippines
