= High 5 Futsal League =

- Organising body: PFF (formerly); Moran Foundation
- Founded: 2023; 3 years ago
- Country: Philippines
- Confederation: AFC (Asia)

The High 5 Futsal League (stylized as HIGH 5) is a developmental futsal league in the Philippines organized by The Henry V. Moran Foundation and formerly affiliated with the Philippine Football Federation until 2024. It has a men's and women's division.

== History ==
Futsal director Vic Hermans led the organization of the High 5 Women's Futsal League in 2023, an league held under the auspices of the Philippine Football Federation futsal department and The Henry V. Moran Foundation of Danny Moran.

A U23 Women's Futsal League was held in 2022 which was participated by mostly university teams which served as the pooling source for the newly revived Philippines women's national futsal team which played a series of friendlies against Guam in October 2022.

The inaugural women's open league season 2023 had eight teams. A men's open league was also held for the first time with eleven teams.

== Participating teams (2026) ==
Women's

- Caramia
- FC Tamaraw
- Lunar FC
- Payatas
- Pinay5
- PUP Radicals
- Stars United FC

Men's

- Cabadbaran City FC
- FC Tamaraw
- Payatas
- PWU Patriots
- Stars United FC
- Western Bicutan FC

== Summary ==
Men's

Season		Winner	Runner-up	Third place
No.	Year	Winner	Runner-up	Third place
1st	2023	Enderun	NCF Tigers	Alumni Futsal Manila
2nd	2024	Enderun	Tuloy	RTU
3rd	2024	GK SipaG	PWU	RTU
4th	2025	Tuloy	ADA	RTU
5th	2026	Azkals Development Club	UMak-Azzurri	Payatas
6th	2026			

Women's

Season		Winner	Runner-up	Third place
No.	Year	Winner	Runner-up	Third place
1st	2023	Tuloy	Azzurri	Payatas
2nd	2024	Tuloy	GK SipaG	Payatas
3rd	2024	Tuloy	Azzurri	PWU
4th	2025	Pinay5	PWU	Tuloy
5th	2026	Azkals Development Club	Pinay5	Limitless Youth United
6th	2026			

== See also ==
- Philippine Futsal League
- PFF Futsaliga
- Futsal in the Philippines
