= Philippine Futsal League =

- Founded: 2009
- Folded: 2016
- Country: Philippines
- Confederation: AFC
- Level on pyramid: 1 (2009–2016)
- International cup(s): AFC Futsal Club Championship; AFF Futsal Club Championship
- Broadcaster(s): PFF TV (YouTube)
- Website: www.pfl.org.ph

The Philippine Futsal League was the top-flight futsal league in the Philippines. The league hosts separate competitions for both men and women. It was founded in 2009 and organized by the futsal committee of the Philippine Football Federation. It was for long headed by Esmaeil Sedigh who formerly coached the Philippines national futsal team.

== Summary ==
Men's division

Season		Winner	Runner Up	Third Place
No.	Year	Winner	Runner Up	Third Place
1st	2009			
2nd	2010-11			
3rd	2011	Pasargad		
4th	2012	Pasargad	Pars	Komrads
5th	2016	Enderun Titans	PF Knights	Pasargad

Women's division

Season		Winner	Runner Up	Third Place
No.	Year	Winner	Runner Up	Third Place
1st	2009			
2nd	2010-11			
3rd	2011			
4th	2012	Pasargad	Enderun Titans	Lady Futsalistas
5th	2016	OutKast	Pasargad	Enderun Titans

== See also ==
- High 5 Futsal League
- PFF Futsaliga
- Futsal in the Philippines
