= Philippines at the FIFA Futsal Women's World Cup =

International futsal delegation

The Philippines women's national futsal team, known as the Filipina5 participated in the inaugural edition of the FIFA Futsal Women's World Cup in 2025, where the team automatically qualified as the host nation.

== 2025 ==
=== Matches ===
November 21, 2025
20:30 UTC+8

Philippines	0–6	Poland
	Report	Basta 6'19", 23'55"; Matuszewska 18'18"; Szostak 22'18"; Ortillo 25'50" (o.g.); Dymińska 29'53"

PhilSports Arena, Pasig
Attendance: 2,211
Referee: Anelize Schultz (Brazil)
November 24, 2025
20:30 UTC+8

Philippines	2–3	Morocco
Tolentin 3'53"; Graversen 7'01"	Report	Laftah 9'47"; Tadlaoui 13'55"; Demraoui 16'56"

PhilSports Arena, Pasig
Attendance: 1,771
Referee: Alice Vévodová (Czech Republic)
November 27, 2025
20:30 UTC+8

Argentina	5–1	Philippines
Villalba 1'35"; Romero 3'15"; Natta 3'57"; Chiesa 6'07"; Quevedo 6'56"	Report	Bandoja 27'24"

PhilSports Arena, Pasig
Attendance: 2,811
Referee: Krystin Pahia (United States)

== Record ==
The Philippines' FIFA Futsal Women's World Cup record
Year	Result	Position	GP	W	D	L	GF	GA	GD
(Philippines) 2025	13/16	Group stage	3	0	0	3	3	14	-11
Total	1/1	Group stage	3	0	0	3	3	14	-11

=== By match ===
FIFA Futsal Women's World Cup history
Year	Round	Date	Opponent	Result	Stadium
(Philippines) 2025	Group stage	Nov 21	Poland	L 0–6	PhilSports Arena, Pasig
(Philippines) 2025	Group stage	Nov 24	Morocco	L 2–3	PhilSports Arena, Pasig
(Philippines) 2025	Group stage	Nov 27	Argentina	L 1–5	PhilSports Arena, Pasig

=== By opponent ===
FIFA Futsal Women's World Cup matches (by team)
Opponent	Pld	W	D	L	GF	GA
Poland	1	0	0	1	0	6
Morocco	1	0	0	1	2	3
Argentina	1	0	0	1	1	5
