= PFF Futsaliga =

- Organising body: PFF
- Founded: 2026; 0 years ago
- Country: Philippines
- Confederation: AFC
- Number of clubs: M: 8 W: 8
- Level on pyramid: 1
- Current champions: ADC (men's open); FEU (women's open) (2026)
- Current Plate: Tondo (men's open); UMaK (women's open) (2026)
- Current: 2026 PFF Futsaliga

The PFF Futsaliga is the national domestic futsal league of the Philippine Football Federation.

== History ==
After the inaugural 2025 FIFA Futsal Women's World Cup, the Philippine Sports Commission decided to commit the refurbished PhilSports Arena as a futsal-specialized venue. This led to the Philippine Football Federation (PFF) establishing a futsal league.

The first season of the PFF Futsaliga was held from February 28 to May 17, 2026 with four divisions: men's open, women's open, under-17 girls, and the under-17 boys.

== Teams ==
Men's Open Division	Women Open Division
ADC; Enderun; PWU; Radicals; Sporting QC; Tondo; UMaK; UA&P	Azzuri; ADC; Beach Hut; Enderun; FEU Lady Tamaraw; Forza; PWU; UMaK

== Venue ==
All matches of the league were held at the PhilSports Arena in Pasig, Metro Manila.

Pasig	PFF Futsaliga venue
PhilSports Arena	PFF Futsaliga venue
Capacity: 10,000	PFF Futsaliga venue

== 2026 season ==
=== Format ===
The eight teams per division play in a single round-robin elimination round before advancing to the play-offs. The top four teams advance to the cup semifinals while the bottom teams play in the plate semifinals.

=== Men's ===
PFF Futsaliga Men's Open
- Season: 2026
- Dates: March 1–April 26 (elimination round); May 10–17 (play-offs)
- Teams: 8
- Champions: ADC
- Runner up: Enderun
- Plate: Tondo

==== Elimination round ====
Pos	Team	Pld	W	D	L	GF	GA	GD	Pts	Qualification
1	ADC	7	6	1	0	42	10	+32	19	Cup semifinals
2	Enderun	7	5	0	2	40	20	+20	15	Cup semifinals
3	PWU	7	5	0	2	27	18	+9	15	Cup semifinals
4	UA&P	7	5	0	2	25	18	+7	15	Cup semifinals
5	Tondo	7	3	1	3	35	22	+13	10	Plate semifinals
6	Radicals	7	1	1	5	24	29	−5	4	Plate semifinals
7	UMaK	7	1	1	5	17	31	−14	4	Plate semifinals
8	Sporting QC	7	0	0	7	8	70	−62	0	Plate semifinals

Source: PFF

==== Knock-out stage ====
===== Bracket =====
Cup semi-finals
E1	ADC	7
E4	UA&P	2
E2	Enderun	9
E3	PWU	2

Cup final
ADC	5
Enderun	4
Third place
UA&P	2
PWU	0

Plate semi-finals
E5	Tondo	14
E9	Sporting QC	1
E6	Radicals	7
E7	UMaK	1

Plate final
Tondo	11
Radicals	4
Seventh place
Sporting QC	11
UMaK	3

===== Plate (5th–8th) =====
====== Semi-finals ======
May 10, 2026	Tondo	14–1	Sporting QC	Pasig
		Report		Stadium: Philsports Arena

May 10, 2026	Radicals	7–1	UMaK	Pasig
		Report		Stadium: Philsports Arena

====== Seventh place game ======
May 17, 2026	Sporting QC	11–3	UMaK	Pasig
		Report		Stadium: Philsports Arena

====== Plate final ======
May 17, 2026	Tondo	11–4	Radicals	Pasig
		Report		Stadium: Philsports Arena

===== Cup (1st–4th) =====
====== Semi-finals ======
May 10, 2026	ADC	7–2	UA&P	Pasig
		Report		Stadium: Philsports Arena

May 10, 2026	Enderun	9–2	PWU	Pasig
		Report		Stadium: Philsports Arena

====== Third place game ======
May 17, 2026	UA&P	2–0	PWU	Pasig
		Report		Stadium: Philsports Arena

====== Final ======
May 17, 2026	ADC	5–4	Enderun	Pasig
		Report		Stadium: Philsports Arena

=== Women's ===
PFF Futsaliga Women's Open
- Season: 2026
- Dates: March 1–April 26 (elimination round); May 10–17 (play-offs)
- Teams: 8
- Champions: FEU Lady Tamaraws
- Runner up: Beach Hut
- Plate: UMaK

==== Elimination round ====
Pos	Team	Pld	W	D	L	GF	GA	GD	Pts	Qualification
1	FEU Lady Tamaraws	7	6	1	0	26	1	+25	19	Cup semifinals
2	Beach Hut	7	5	2	0	21	6	+15	17	Cup semifinals
3	ADC	7	5	0	2	33	14	+19	15	Cup semifinals
4	Enderun	7	4	0	3	23	14	+9	12	Cup semifinals
5	UMaK	7	3	1	3	22	16	+6	10	Plate semifinals
6	Azzuri	7	2	0	5	14	28	−14	6	Plate semifinals
7	PWU	7	1	0	6	12	25	−13	3	Plate semifinals
8	Forza	7	0	0	7	3	50	−47	0	Plate semifinals

Source: PFF

==== Knock-out stage ====
===== Bracket =====
Cup semi-finals
E1	FEU Lady Tamaraws	4
E4	Enderun	0
E2	ADC	0
E3	Beach Hut	1

Cup final
FEU Lady Tamaraws	4
Beach Hut	1
Third place
Enderun	3
ADC	2

Plate semi-finals
E5	UMaK	16
E8	Forza	0
E6	Azzuri	1
E7	PWU	2

Plate final
UMaK	5
PWU	3
Seventh place
Forza	1
Azzuri	7

===== Plate (5th–8th) =====
====== Semi-finals ======
May 10, 2026	UMaK	16–0	Forza	Pasig
		https://pff.org.ph/ppff-futsaliga-womens-semis-toledo-winner-sends-beach-hut-to-final-to-meet-spotless-feu/ Report]		Stadium: Philsports Arena

May 10, 2026	Azzuri	1–2	PWU	Pasig
		https://pff.org.ph/ppff-futsaliga-womens-semis-toledo-winner-sends-beach-hut-to-final-to-meet-spotless-feu/ Report]		Stadium: Philsports Arena

====== Seventh place game ======
May 17, 2026	Forza	1–7	Azzuri	Pasig
		Report		Stadium: Philsports Arena

====== Plate final ======
May 17, 2026	UMaK	5–3	PWU	Pasig
		Report		Stadium: Philsports Arena

===== Cup (1st–4th) =====
====== Semi-finals ======
May 10, 2026	FEU Lady Tamaraws	4–0	Enderun	Pasig
		Report		Stadium: Philsports Arena

May 10, 2026	ADC	0–1	Beach Hut	Pasig
		Report		Stadium: Philsports Arena

====== Third place game ======
May 17, 2026	Enderun	3–2	ADC	Pasig
		Report		Stadium: Philsports Arena

====== Final ======
May 17, 2026	FEU Lady Tamaraws	4–1	Beach Hut	Pasig
		Report		Stadium: Philsports Arena

== See also ==
- Philippine Futsal League
- High 5 Futsal League
- Futsal in the Philippines
- AFF Futsal Club Championship
- AFC Futsal Club Championship
