= Futsal at the 2025 SEA Games – Women's team squads =

List of footballers

The women's futsal tournament at the 2025 SEA Games was held from 12 to 18 December 2025. The six national teams involved in the tournament were required to register a squad of 14 players, including two goalkeepers. Only players in these squads were eligible to take part in the tournament.

The age listed for each player is on 12 December 2025, the first day of the tournament. The numbers of caps and goals listed for each player do not include any matches played after the start of the tournament. The club listed is the club for which the player last played a competitive match prior to the tournament. (Note: This is the club a player was last able to play for during the previous season in the event a player did not play a competitive match.) The nationality for each club reflects the national association (not the league) to which the club is affiliated. A flag is included for coaches who are of a different nationality than their own national team.

== Group A ==
=== Thailand ===
Head coach: Tanatorn Santanaprasit

=== Malaysia ===
Head coach: Jamhuri Zainuddin

=== Philippines ===
Head coach: (Spain) Rafa Merino

No.	Pos.	Player	Date of birth (age)	Caps	Goals	Club
	GK	Samantha Hughes	May 21, 2008 (age 18)	15	0	(Football Australia) Sala Time
	GK	Kayla Santiago	August 4, 2001 (age 25)	5	0	(Philippine Football Federation) UA&P
	DF	Cathrine Graversen	April 25, 1998 (age 28)	14	1	(Danish Football Association) B.93
	DF	Sheen Borres	January 2, 1998 (age 28)	4	0	(Philippine Football Federation) Kaya–Iloilo
	DF	Rhea Chan	September 24, 2000 (age 26)	1	0	(Philippine Football Federation) Stallion Laguna
	DF	Lyka Cuenco	October 30, 2003 (age 23)	1	0	(Philippine Football Federation) Kaya–Iloilo
	DF	Vrendelle Nuera	August 25, 2004 (age 22)	13	0	(Philippine Football Federation) GK SipaG
	MF	Lanie Ortillo	April 8, 2005 (age 21)	15	2	(Philippine Football Federation) Tuloy
	MF	Charisa Lemoran	September 21, 1998 (age 28)	7	0	(Philippine Football Federation) Stallion Laguna
	MF	Rocelle Mendaño	May 19, 2000 (age 26)	10	0	(Philippine Football Federation) Kaya–Iloilo
	MF	Jaycee DeFazio	January 3, 2005 (age 21)	1	0	(United States Soccer Federation) Cal Poly Mustangs
	FW	Dionesa Tolentin	June 25, 2000 (age 26)	11	5	(Philippine Football Federation) Kaya–Iloilo
	FW	Isabella Bandoja	March 30, 2001 (age 25)	15	6	(Philippine Football Federation) Tuloy
	FW	Regine Rebosora	September 21, 2001 (age 25)	8	0	(Philippine Football Federation) FEU

== Group B ==
=== Vietnam ===
Vietnam announced their final squad on 9 December 2025.

Head coach: Nguyễn Đình Hoàng

No.	Pos.	Player	Date of birth (age)	Club
	GK	Trần Thị Hải Yến	1998 (aged 26–27)	(Vietnam Football Federation) Phong Phú Hà Nam
	GK	Ngô Nguyễn Thùy Linh	21 September 1991 (aged 34)	(Vietnam Football Federation) Thái Sơn Nam HCMC
	DF	Nguyễn Thị Vân Anh	13 August 1996 (aged 29)	(Vietnam Football Federation) Thái Sơn Nam HCMC
	DF	Trần Thị Thùy Trang	8 August 1988 (aged 37)	(Vietnam Football Federation) Hồ Chí Minh City
	DF	A Dắt Rin Tô		(Vietnam Football Federation) Thái Sơn Nam HCMC
	DF	Nguyễn Phương Anh	1999 (aged 25–26)	(Vietnam Football Federation) Thái Sơn Nam HCMC
	MF	Trần Nguyệt Vi	22 September 1999 (aged 26)	(Vietnam Football Federation) Thái Sơn Nam HCMC
	MF	Lê Thị Thanh Ngân	8 April 2001 (aged 24)	(Vietnam Football Federation) Thái Sơn Nam HCMC
	MF	Biện Thị Hằng	9 August 1996 (aged 29)	(Vietnam Football Federation) Hà Nội
	FW	Trần Thị Thu Xuân	21 December 2002 (aged 22)	(Vietnam Football Federation) Than KSVN
	FW	K'Thủa	13 August 2003 (aged 22)	(Vietnam Football Federation) Hồ Chí Minh City
	FW	Bùi Thị Trang	10 November 1997 (aged 28)	(Vietnam Football Federation) Thái Sơn Nam HCMC
		Đinh Thị Ngọc Hân	2000 (aged 24–25)	(Vietnam Football Federation) Thái Sơn Nam HCMC
		Lâm Thị Xuân		(Vietnam Football Federation) Thái Sơn Nam HCMC

=== Myanmar ===
Head coach: U Htay Myint

=== Indonesia ===
Head coach: (Portugal) Luís Estrela The Indonesia Futsal Federation announced their final squad on 11 December 2025.

No.	Pos.	Player	Date of birth (age)	Caps	Goals	Club
	GK	Sella Salsadila	4 August 2000 (aged 25)			(Football Association of Indonesia) Kebumen United Angels
	GK	Fitry Amelya	12 February 2004 (aged 21)			(Football Association of Indonesia) KLN Angels
	DF	Novita Murni (captain)	2 November 1990 (aged 35)			(Football Association of Indonesia) MSP FC
	DF	Diah Tri Lestari	7 September 1995 (aged 30)			(Football Association of Indonesia) MSP FC
	DF	Dhea Febrina	8 February 2001 (aged 24)			(Football Association of Indonesia) Netic Ladies FC
	MF	Nisma Francida	14 June 1998 (aged 27)			(Football Association of Indonesia) Kebumen United Angels
	MF	Dinar Kartika Sari	21 April 2000 (aged 25)			(Football Association of Indonesia) Kebumen United Angels
	MF	Fitri Sundari	22 November 2005 (aged 20)			(Football Association of Indonesia) KLN Angels
	MF	Quisepina Anastasia Olin	8 October 2004 (aged 21)			(Football Association of Indonesia) KLN Angels
	MF	Agnes Matulapelwa	26 October 2005 (aged 20)			(Football Association of Indonesia) Netic Ladies
	MF	Asselah Terecita Lukuaka	2 June 2007 (aged 18)			(Football Association of Indonesia) KLN Angels
	MF	Suciana Yuliani	11 July 1992 (aged 33)			(Football Association of Indonesia) Kebumen United Angels
	FW	Fitri Rosdiana	26 March 1993 (aged 32)			(Football Association of Indonesia) MS Putri Bersatu
	FW	Ikeu Rosita	1 July 2000 (aged 25)			(Football Association of Indonesia) Kebumen United Angels
