= RFA Youth League =

- Organising body: Member regional football associations of the Philippine Football Federation
- Founded: 2026
- Country: Philippines
- Divisions: U11, U13 (8v8 football and futsal)
- Number of clubs: 286 (U11); 332 (U13)

The Regional Football Associations Youth League (RFA YL), or the RFA Youth League, is a series of youth football and futsal leagues ran under the auspices of the Philippine Football Federation (PFF).

== History ==
The Philippine Football Federation (PFF) under the administration President John Gutierrez launched the Regional Football Associations Youth League (RFA Youth League) as part of its effort to develop the grassroots program of Philippine football. This is a deviation from the previous practice of organizing one-off tournaments and training camps to determine talents for the national teams.

It was launched in September 2026, with the inaugural run to las through November 2026.

== Format ==
Tournaments are organized by the PFF's member regional football associations in the under-11 and under-13 brackets in football and futsal. Football is played with the 8v8 format, with teams having eight players instead of the standard eleven.

== Editions ==
Under-11

Year	Dates	No. of RFAs	No. of teams				Ref.
Year	Dates	No. of RFAs	Luzon	Visayas	Mindanao	Total	Ref.
2026	September–November	39	98	58	130	286	

Under-13

Year	Dates	No. of RFAs	No. of teams				Ref.
Year	Dates	No. of RFAs	Luzon	Visayas	Mindanao	Total	Ref.
2026	September–November	39	127	67	138	332	
