= Danny Moran =

Filipino businessman and philanthropist

Personal information
- Full name: Daniel M. Moran

College career
Years	Team	Apps	(Gls)
1974–1978	De La Salle University		

Senior career*
Years	Team	Apps	(Gls)
1977–1978	U/Tex		
1978–1980	San Miguel		

International career
1970s	Philippines		
- * Club domestic league appearances and goals

Daniel M. Moran is a Filipino retired footballer, businessman and philanthropist.

== Early life and education ==
Danny Moran was born to Henry V. Moran and Edita Moran. He is the second eldest of seven children. He studied at the De La Salle University system from primary school. He graduated with a bachelor's degree in mathematics from De La Salle in 1977.

== Football ==
=== Playing career ===
A product of the Kasibulan grassroots program of the Philippine Football Association (PFA) along with his brother Mike, Danny Moran was a player for the Philippines national football team in the 1970s.

He also played for the De La Salle football team helping them clinch three National Collegiate Athletic Association (NCAA) titles (1974–75, 1976–77, 1977–78) and a University Athletic Association of the Philippines (UAAP) title (1975). Likewise, he also played with his brother Mike with La Salle.

At a club level, Moran played for U/Tex from 1977 to 1978 and the San Miguel Corporation team from 1978 to 1980. With San Miguel, Moran won the 1978–79 National League Championship.

=== Post-retirement ===
After his retirement, Moran became a patron of football, including futsal.

He established The Henry V. Moran Foundation (THVMF) which was named after his father to cater to indigent children. It also promoted football to its beneficiaries. THVMF trained teams which represented the Philippines at the 2008 and 2009 Homeless World Cups and the 2010 Street Child World Cup.

He helped develop the football programs of Gawad Kalinga and Tuloy sa Don Bosco.

He began promoting futsal in 2015 via Tuloy. This led to the establishment of the Liga Eskwela Futsal program in 2016 in coordination with the Department of Education and the Philippine Football Federation.

Moran's foundation and the PFF under president Mariano Araneta brought in Vic Hermans to help run the PFF's futsal program and helped re-established a Philippines women's national futsal team in 2022. However by January 2025, Hermans was removed from his position as women's national team coach and Moran from his role as team manager by the PFF administration under John Gutierrez.

The Pinay5 Futsal Club was then formed by Moran and is billed as the first professional women's futsal club in the Philippines.

== Business career ==
Moran helped his wife Tessie manage a desert and pastry business set up in 1979 which eventually grew to be the Red Ribbon Bakeshop chain. Red Ribbon which had grown to a network 146 stores, including 20 in the United States, was sold to Jollibee Foods Corporation in 2005.

In 2007 he acquired the Amici restaurant chain through a former coworker at IBM networking him with the Tuloy sa Don Bosco. The brand which is also known for its gelato was established by Gianluigi Colombo, an Italian Salesian priest in 1994. Moran also now owns the associated Cara Mia bakeshop.

== Personal life ==
Moran is married to Tessie Mercado, a woman from Pampanga who was his college girlfriend.
