= Campuestohan Highland Resort =

Theme park in Talisay, Philippines

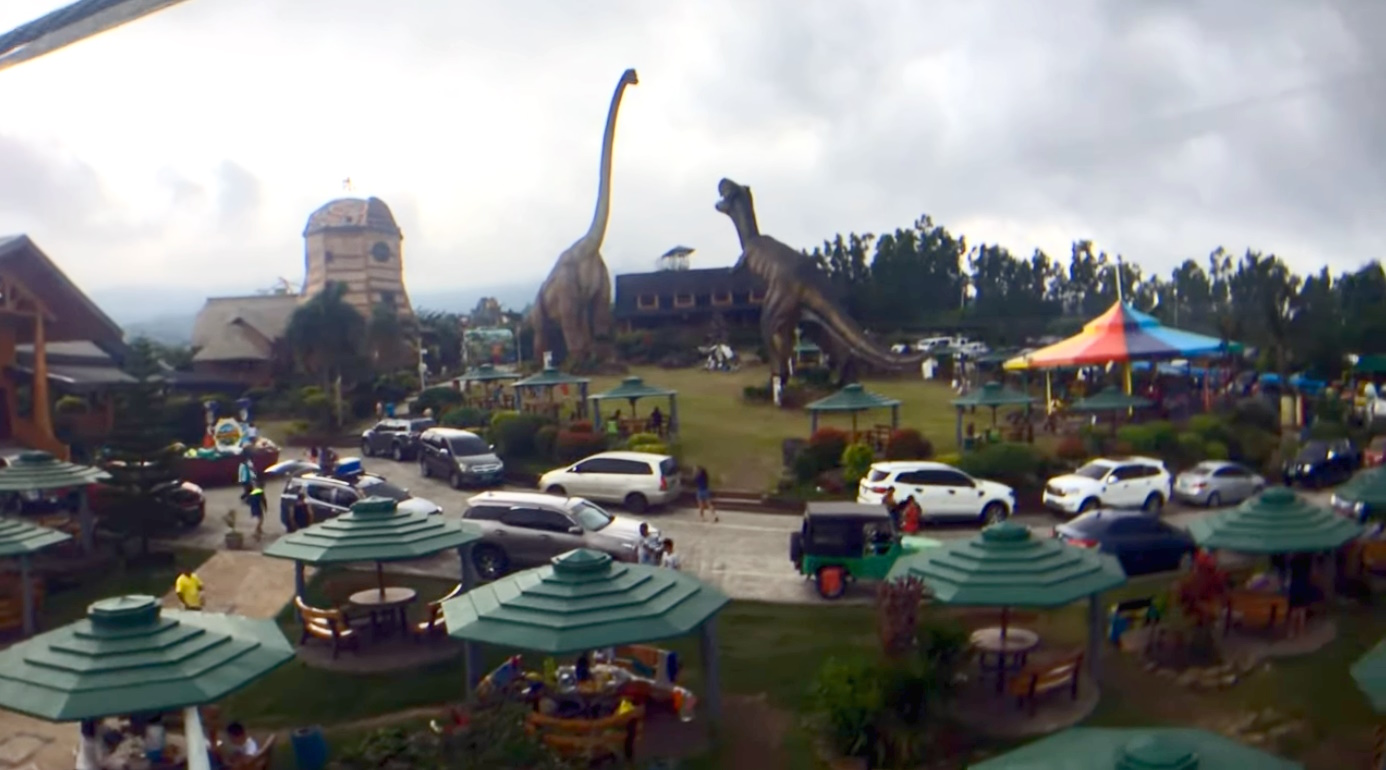
- Interactive map of Campuestohan Highland Resort
- Location: Talisay, Negros Occidental
- Coordinates: 10°39′39.2″N 123°08′36.5″E
- Status: Operating
- Opened: May 2014
- Owner: Ricardo Tan
- Area: 11 ha (27 acres)

The Campuestohan Highland Resort is a theme park and resort in Talisay, Negros Occidental.

== History ==
The site of the Campuestohan Highland Resort was offered to the Tan family in 2009. The property was bought in 2010 by Ricardo Tan, initially planning to use the land to build a retirement home for his wife, Nita. It started out as a 5 hectares (12 acres) property.

Despite skepticism from relatives and friends over the site called a "dead place", Tan developed the area into an eco-tourism-oriented theme park and resort called the Campuestohan Highland Resort. Construction began in June 2011. Campuestohan eventually had its grand launch in May 2014.

The Dinosaurs Park opened in 2017.

Despite an assassination attempt on Ricardo and Nita Tan in December 2018, the resort continues to develop under the ownership of the Tans.

In October 2024, the resort inaugurated the Manok ni Cano Gwapo rooster-shaped hotel building.

== Attractions ==
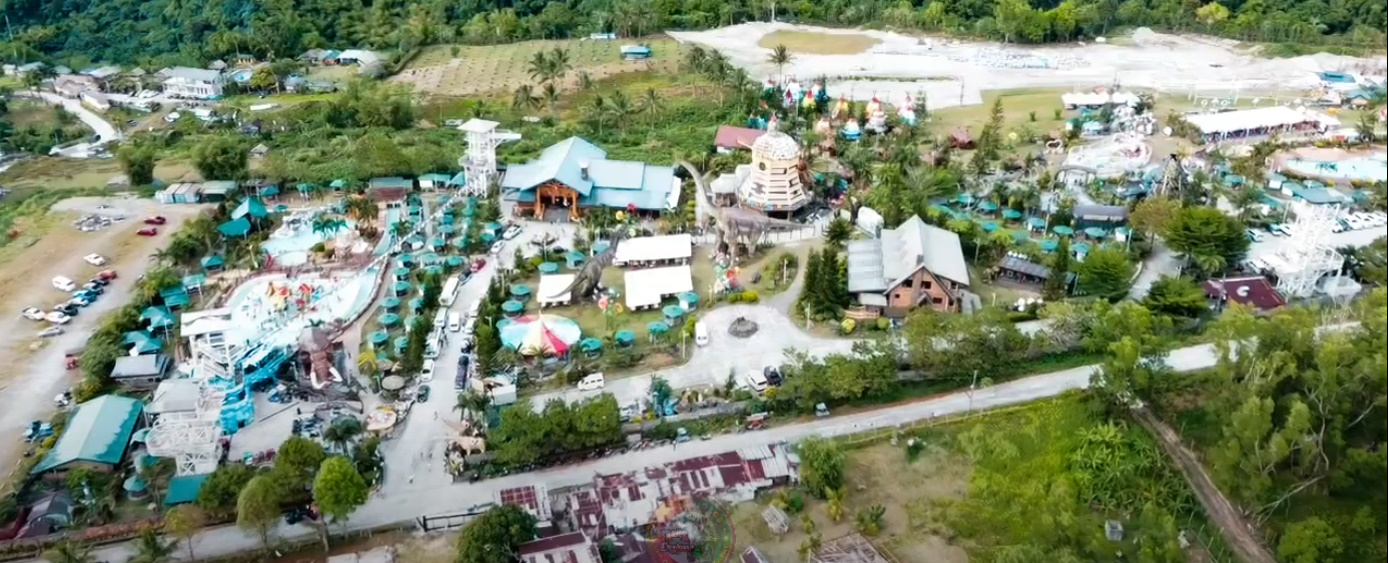
Resort layout (2024)

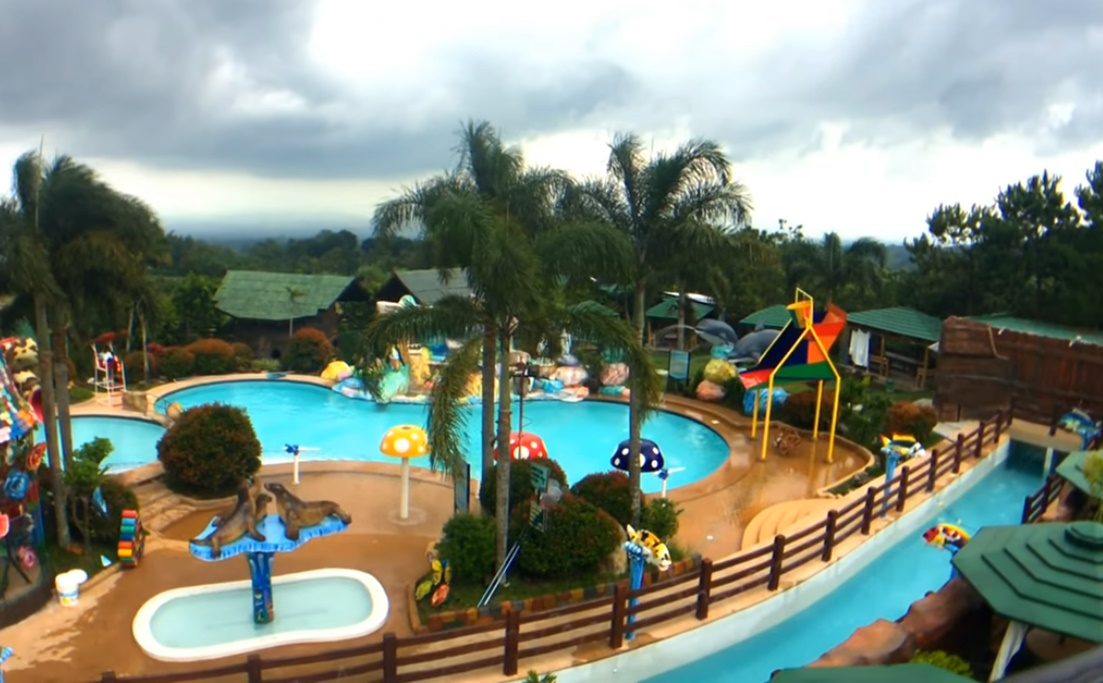
Water park area.

Campuestohan covers an area of 11 hectares (27 acres). It is noted for its Dinosaurs Park which features moving and stationary models of dinosaurs. It also have a water park which includes wave pools, foam bath as well as a sky bike and zip lines.

The Manok ni Cano Gwapo is recognized by Guinness World Records as the "tallest building in the shape of a chicken" at the time of its inauguration.

== Reception ==
The resort is recognized as one of the top destinations in the Western Visayas region (Talisay is now part of the Negros Island Region since 2024) in the Pagdayaw 2023 by the Department of Tourism.
