= John Gutierrez =

Filipino sports executive

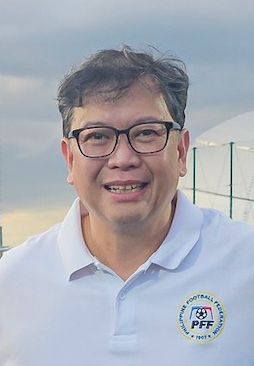
- Gutierrez in 2025

President of the Philippine Football Federation
- Incumbent
- Assumed office November 25, 2023
- Preceded by: Mariano Araneta

Personal details
- Born: John Anthony Gutierrez; March 23, 1977 (age 49)
- Occupation: Businessman, sports administrator

John Anthony Gutierrez (born March 23, 1977) is a Filipino businessman and sports executive. He is the president of the Philippine Football Federation since November 2023.

== Career ==
=== Business ===
Gutierrez is the president of Air Juan, a charter airline which operates in the Philippines. The airline has been operational since 2012.

=== Sports administration ===
==== Pachanga ====
Pachanga, a club which competed in the defunct United Football League was owned by Gutierrez.

==== PFF presidency ====
Affiliated with the Bukidnon Football Association, Gutierrez was elected as president of the Philippine Football Federation (PFF) on November 25, 2023, succeeding Mariano Araneta. He received 30 out of 36 votes, outbesting Filbert Alquiros of Stallion Laguna, and Henry Sabate of Davao-South RFA. He pledged the continuity of Araneta's program and expressed his intent to prioritize the grassroots football program in the Philippines.

Gutierez appointed Freddy Gonzales as director of the PFF's national teams while maintaining patron Jeff Cheng as manager of the Philippines women's national team. Cheng led the in its 2022 AFF Women's Championship title and 2023 FIFA Women's World Cup maiden campaign. Dan Palami stepped down from his role as team manager of the Philippine national team, and subsequently the PFF abandoned the "Azkals" moniker.

However, Cheng departed from his role in June 2024. The president maintained that the PFF tried to negotiate with Cheng but the latter left due to a "situation that was not workable".

In May 2024, the Philippines was awarded hosting rights for the inaugural FIFA Futsal Women's World Cup in 2025. As part of the host's preparation, the 2024 ASEAN Women's Futsal Championship was held – the first international tournament under the Gutierrez administration.

In October 2024, the PFF launched the Football Starts At Home (FSAH) grassroots program which aims to promote football among children.

He declared the men's national team campaign at the 2024 ASEAN Championship as the best ever after the Philippines' returned to the semifinals of the regional tournament, winning its first leg match against Thailand (2–1) and its second leg match going into extra time with the same opponent before losing 1–3.

The PFF's scheduling for an earlier training camp for the women's national futsal team in late December 2024 than what head coach Vic Hermans scheduled caused controversy. Hermans was realigned with the men's futsal program causing players to threaten resignation. This also caused a rift with futsal patron Danny Moran who initially wrote to Gutierrez to reconsider the move. Nevertheless a new squad was formed led by Spanish coach Rafa Merino for the 2025 AFC Women's Futsal Asian Cup qualifiers in January 2025. The media was told to "behave" preventing further queries about the squad overhaul. The national team did qualify for the 2025 AFC Women's Futsal Asian Cup in China as the best third placed team across all groups.

His administration received further scrutiny when the PFF restricted access to longtime football journalist Venice Furio, who was seeking to interview Philippine women's national team players at a publicly accessible training camp at the SM Mall of Asia football field allegedly over Furio's critical online comments on social media. The PFF refutes the claim stating they did not ban anyone and says it was the coaching staff's request to limit access by the media to minimize distractions during training.

Gutierrez expressed support for the aborted FIFA Forward Enterprise of FIFA President Gianni Infantino in August 2026.

At the 7th Philippine Sports Tourism Awards in August 2026, the PFF under his administration was awarded the National Sports Association of the Year and International Event of the Year for the hosting of the 2025 FIFA Futsal Women's World Cup.

== Personal life ==
Gutierrez is from Dipolog, Zamboanga del Norte.
