= Manok ni Cano Gwapo =

- The Manok in 2024

General information
- Status: Completed
- Type: Hotel
- Location: Campuestohan Highland Resort, Talisay, Negros Occidental, Philippines
- Coordinates: 10°39′37.3″N 123°08′39.1″E
- Construction started: June 10, 2023
- Completed: September 8, 2024
- Inaugurated: October 19, 2024

Height
- Height: 34.93 m (114.6 ft)

Dimensions
- Other dimensions: 39 by 28.172 meters (127.95 ft × 92.43 ft) (width and length)

Technical details
- Floor count: 6

Design and construction
- Architect: None
- Other designers: Ricardo Tan (concept)
- Known for: "The largest building in the shape of a chicken" as per Guinness World Records (2024)

Other information
- Number of rooms: 15

Manok ni Cano Gwapo (lit. 'Chicken of Handsome Cano') is a hotel structure in Talisay, Negros Occidental, Philippines. The 15-room structure is part of the Campuestohan Highland Resort of businessman and politician Ricardo Tan.

== History ==
The Campuestohan Highland Resort, the resort hotel complex which the Manok structure stands has been operating since 2014 and is owned by businessman and former Bacolod city councilor Ricardo "Cano" Tan.

Construction of the Manok ni Cano Gwapo lasted for 456 days from June 10, 2023. The Manok was unveiled by Tan to the public on March 11, 2024, when the building is already half complete. The Guinness World Records oversaw the construction and on September 8, 2024, conferred it with the recognition of being "the largest building in the shape of a chicken". The Department of Tourism intends to promote as a "landmark" destination of Negros Occidental.

It was inaugurated on October 19, 2024. The Bacolod City Council issued a resolution lauding the construction of the rooster-shaped hotel building.

== Architecture and design ==
The Manok ni Cano Gwapo was named after Ricardo Tan who had "years" to conceptualize the structure. It had a rooster theme as a tribute to Negros Occidental's cockfighting multibillion peso industry. According to Tan, the blood sport is second to province's sugar cane industry. No architect was involved with its design drafted by artists.

The structure functions as a hotel with 15 rooms and its height is roughly equivalent to six-storey building. It has a viewing deck and has two smaller chicken sculptures at its base.

According to the Guinness World Records organization, the structure has the following measurements; 34.931 meters (114.60 ft) in height, 39.9 meters (131 ft) in width, and 28.172 meters (92.43 ft) in length.
