= Lope Pascual =

Filipino military general and sports administrator

President of the Philippine Football Federation
- In office ? – November 1995
- Succeeded by: Honesto Isleta (acting); Ricardo Tan

Personal details
- Died: June 4, 2019 (aged 84) Los Angeles, U.S.
Association football career
Managerial career
- Years: Team
- 1980s: Philippine Air Force

Lope Q. Pascual was a Filipino military general and sports administrator.

== Career ==
Pascual was one of the coaches for the Philippine Air Force F.C. The club won several national league titles in the 1980s under Pascual.

Pascual would become president of the Philippine Football Federation. He tapped the services of German head coach Eckhard Krautzun for the Philippine national team. Krautzun helped the team finished as semifinalists in the 1991 Southeast Asian Games, the best result of the country in the men's football competition of the regional games. He also attempted to create a sustainable Philippine League but had problems organizing matches in the rural areas.

He got involved in a dispute with the Rizal Football Association (RIFA), over RIFA's suspension of its member Xavier School, which led to his eventual removal as president.

Pascual left the PFF sometime in 1995 to go to the United States to tend to his ailing wife. He tasked Undersecretary Honesto Isleta to take over the federation's operations. Ricardo Tan was elected to replace Pascual in November 1995.

== Death ==
Pascual died on June 4, 2019, at age 84.
