= Henri Kahn =

Filipino sports administrator (died 2021)

President of the Philippine Football Federation
- In office 1988–1992

Personal details
- Born: 1951 or 1952
- Died: November 6, 2021 (aged 69)

Henri Kahn (died November 6, 2021) was a Filipino sports administrator and former collegiate footballer. He was president of the Philippine Football Federation and the general manager of the University of Life Theater Recreation Arena complex.

== Education ==
Kahn was a student of the De La Salle University, from elementary to college level. He graduated with a degree in business administration. He played for his school's collegiate team, helping them clinch the National Collegiate Athletic Association football championship seniors title in 1973.

== Career ==
Kahn is known for promoting events at the University of Life Theater Recreation Arena (ULTRA) complex, now known as the University of Life Theater Recreation Arena and would become its general manager by the time of the 1981 Southeast Asian Games. He convinced Philippine Basketball Association (PBA) commissioner Rudy Salud, to move the PBA's games to the venue. He was also president of the Philippine Football Federation from 1988 to 1992. He oversaw the preparation of the Philippines national football team for the 1989 Southeast Asian Games in Kuala Lumpur.

== Death ==
Kahn died on November 6, 2021. He was 69 years old.

== Personal life ==
Kahn had six children; three sons and three daughters.
