= Rene Adad =

President of the Philippine Football Federation
- In office 1996–2004
- Preceded by: Ricardo Tan
- Succeeded by: Johnny Romualdez

Personal details
- Born: Rene Zayco Adad
- Died: April 24, 2015 (aged 86) Bacolod, Philippines
- Spouse: Carmiña Adad
- Children: 3 (inc. Ana Roces)
- Occupation: Sports executive
- Profession: Lawyer
- Known for: Coke Go For Goal program in the Philippines

Rene Zayco Adad was a Filipino sports and business executive. He served as president of the Philippine Football Federation and was known for the Coke Go For Goal youth football program in the Philippines. He is also the first Filipino branch manager of the Coca-Cola Company in the Philippines.

== Business career ==
Adad was the first Filipino manager of the Coca-Cola Company in the Philippines. He was also the chairman of the Coca-Cola Foundation in the Philippines. He worked with the company for 42 years.

== Involvement in football ==
=== Philippine Football Federation ===
After his retirement from Coca-Cola, Adad served two terms as president of the Philippine Football Federation. In October 1996, Rene Adad was installed as PFF president after a snap election which ousted his predecessor, Ricardo Tan.

He was most known as a major proponent of the Coke Go For Goal program in the Philippines which started in 1983. The Coke Go For Goal was introduced by FIFA in Asia four years earlier in Hong Kong, and its iteration in the Philippines followed the West German government's football development program which prematurely ended in 1981. As part of the program, under-16 boys teams competed against each other in a nationwide tournament. Several future Philippine national team players credited the program for giving them their first competitive football experience including Yanti Bersales, Roel Gener, Eduard Sacapaño, Kim Relucio, and Emelio Caligdong.

The second iteration of the Kasibulan was also started under Adad. The program also known as "Kasibulan 6-12" was oriented on the development of football players aged 6 to 12 years old and also included the conduct of seminars, courses, clinics, and camps for instructors. Adad initiated the program in cooperation of Bernd Fischer, a consultant from the German Football Association and had government support from the then-Department of Education, Culture and Sports as a working partner. The second Kasibulan program ran from 1998 to 2003.

In 2002, the PFF under Adad inaugurated its first regional center in Barotac Nuevo, Iloilo.

Adad ended his tenure as president in 2004. In the same year the Coke Go For Goal program in the Philippines ended which saw the participation of 300 teams across the Philippines in the elimination phase of the last edition of its tournament. The program was like its predecessors were marred with allegations of age cheating by some participating schools. Coca-Cola Philippines had a change of policy deciding to focus on supporting basketball with the company fielding a team in the Philippine Basketball Association from 2002 to 2012.

=== Asian Football Confederation and FIFA ===
Adad was also involved in the affairs of the Asian Football Confederation (AFC) as a member of the executive committee and Executive Council of the AFC. Also a lawyer, Adad also served as deputy chairman of the continental football body. He was also a member of FIFA's women's committee.

== Death ==
Adad died on April 24, 2015, while confined at a hospital in Bacolod at age 86 due to a lingering illness.

== Personal life ==
Rene Adad was married to Carmiña Adad with whom he had a daughter and two sons. His daughter was Ana Roces, who is an actress.
