= Lanie Ortillo =

Filipina footballer (born 2005)

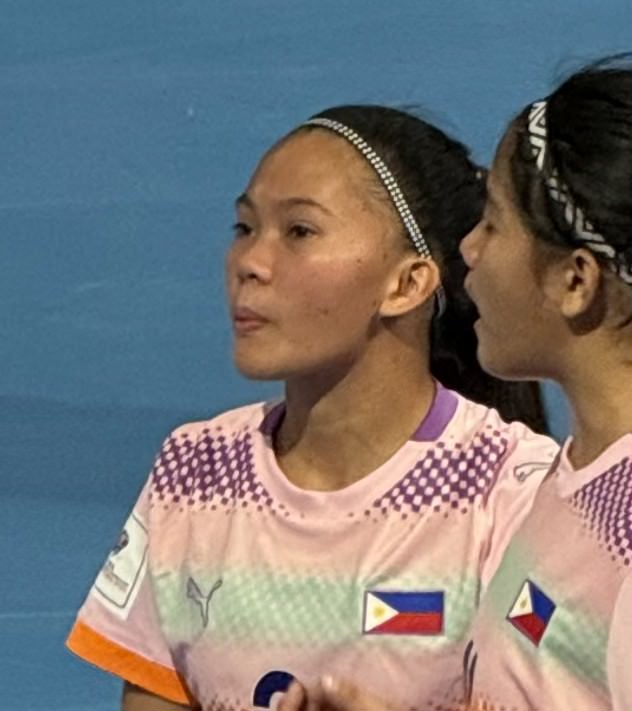
- Ortillo at the 2025 FIFA Futsal Women's World Cup

Personal information
- Date of birth: April 8, 2005 (age 21)
- Height: 1.52 m (5 ft 0 in)

Team information
- Current team: TSL
- Number: 26

Senior career*
Years	Team	Apps	(Gls)
–	Tuloy		
2026–	→ TSL		

International career
2019	Philippines U16		
2023–	Philippines (futsal)	15	(2)
- * Club domestic league appearances and goals

Lanie Ortillo (born April 8, 2005) is a Filipina footballer who plays for Hong Kong Women's League club TSL and the Philippines national futsal team.

== Early life ==
Ortillo was born on April 8, 2005. She was a street urchin who begged for money in Tondo, Manila, before she was taken in by the Tuloy Foundation in Muntinlupa. At age nine, Ortillo was among the two children selected to welcome Pope Francis during the 2015 papal visit to the Philippines.

== Career ==
=== Youth ===
Ortillo played for the football team of her orphanage, at the Alaska Football Cup. She was Most Valuable Player of the girl's under-14 tournament of the 2017 edition.

=== Club ===
As part of Tuloy F.C., Ortillo has played at the PFF Women's League.

In January 2026, Ortillo joined Hong Kong club TSL coming in from Tuloy.

=== International ===
Ortillo made her debut for the Philippine under-19 team at the 2019 AFF U-16 Girls' Championship

Ortillo has also played for the Philippine national futsal team as early as the Tri Nations Futsal tournament in October 2023 in which the team won a silver medal. She also played at the 2024 ASEAN Women's Futsal Championship. Ortillo is among the players which resigned in December 2025 due to an internal dispute between the Philippine Football Federation and the team coached by Victor Hermans.

Ortillo however returned to the national team now coached by Rafa Merino and was named part of the 2025 AFC Women's Futsal Asian Cup. She was also named part of the Philippine squad for the inaugural 2025 FIFA Futsal Women's World Cup.

== Career statistics ==
Scores and results list the Philippines' goal tally first, score column indicates score after each Ortillo goal.

Philippine women's national futsal team goals
No.	Date	Venue	Opponent	Score	Result	Competition	Ref.
1.	October 19, 2023	Ninoy Aquino Stadium, Manila, Philippines	Indonesia	4–7	4–9	PFF Women's Tri Nation Futsal Invitational	
2.	October 20, 2023	Ninoy Aquino Stadium, Manila, Philippines	New Zealand	1–0	1–4	PFF Women's Tri Nation Futsal Invitational	
