= Honesto Isleta =

President of the Philippine Football Federation
- In office 1995 (acting)
- Preceded by: Lope Pascual
- Succeeded by: Ricardo Tan

Personal details
- Born: 1933
- Died: December 2016 (aged 83)
- Military career
- Allegiance: Philippines
- Rank: Brigadier general
- Conflicts: Vietnam War; Moro conflict

Honesto Isleta was a Filipino military officer.

== Career ==
Isleta was part of the Armed Forces of the Philippines (AFP) holding the rank of brigadier general. He was part of the Philippine Civic Action Group which got involved in the Vietnam War from 1967 to 1969. He was also part of the Civil Relations Service of the AFP serving as a disseminator of information to the media during the outbreak of the rebellion of the Moro National Liberation Front in the 1970s.

== Football administration ==
Honesto Isleta served as an official in the Philippine Football Federation as an undersecretary to Lope Pascual. He was entrusted the football federation sometime in 1995, when Pascual to go to the United States to tend to his ailing wife. Ricardo Tan was elected to replace Pascual in November 1995, ending Isleta's interim tenure.

== Death ==
Isleta died in December 2016 due to a lingering kidney ailment at age 83. He was buried at the Libingan ng mga Bayani on December 20.
