= Ricardo Tan =

Filipino politician, businessman and former sports administrator

President of the Philippine Football Federation
- In office November 1995 – October 1996
- Preceded by: Lope Pascual; Honesto Isleta (acting)
- Succeeded by: Rene Adad

Member of the Bacolod City Council
- In office 1995–2001
- In office June 30, 2016 – June 30, 2019

Personal details
- Spouse: Anita Tan
- Occupation: Politician, businessman, sports administrator
- Nickname: "Cano Gwapo"

Ricardo "Cano" Tan is a Filipino politician, businessman and former sports administrator.

== Football administration ==
Tan was president of the Philippine Football Federation from 1995 to 1996. He was elected in November 1995, replacing his absent predecessor Lope Pascual. Among the first issue he dealt with was the Philippines' participation in the football tournament of the 1995 Southeast Asian Games in Chiang Mai, Thailand. This was resolved through a fund-raising by the PFF.

Tan was able to secure technical aid from FIFA following the Asian Football Confederation 17th Congress in Kuala Lumpur, Malaysia. However discontent arose, after Tan allegedly failed to convene the PFF Board on what happened in the meeting in Malaysia as well as a lack of communication between Tan and stakeholders. In October 1996, a snap election was held with Rene Adad voted in to replace Tan.

== Political career ==
=== Bacolod city councilor (1995–2001) ===
Tan served as city councilor of Bacolod from 1995 to 2001.

=== Arroyo administration ===
Under the administration of President Gloria Macapagal Arroyo, Tan served as director of the Manila International Airport Authority. He was also the assistant secretary of the Department of Transportation and Communication (DOTC) from 2004 to 2007 and director of the Land Transportation Office-National Capital Region (LTO-NCR) from 2007 to 2009. He has been an ally of the Arroyo family, even when the former president was still a senator.

=== Return to local politics ===
He made a failed bid to get elected to the House of Representatives in the 2010 elections as representative of Bacolod's at-large district. Tan got elected again as city councilor in the 2016 election.

==== Assassination attempt ====
Tan along his wife were ambushed on December 14, 2018 by unidentified assailants while on a vehicle en-route home from Tan-owned Campuestohan Highland Resort. Both survived the attack. Exactly a year later, his brother Roberto was killed by another attack. Ricardo did not attend any city council sessions after the ambush with his term expiring on June 30, 2019.

In January 2019, then-President Rodrigo Duterte who is organizing a deadly war on drugs, has alleged Tan is linked to illegal drug trade activities. Tan was later cleared by the Philippine National Police Western Visayas office in August 2020. Tan went into hiding until May 2021, when he reappeared to the public and showed the clearance he obtained from the police. He would thank Duterte for revalidating information implicating him to illegal drugs which eventually led to his clearance.

==== 2022 election bid ====
He would re-run for Bacolod city councilor in the 2022 election under Aksyon Demokratiko of presidential candidate Isko Moreno. However he disaffliated himself from Aksyon in April 2022. He lost the bid.

== Business career ==
Tan's family owns the Campuestohan Highland Resort in Talisay, Negros Occidental.

== Personal life ==
Ricardo Tan is married to Anita Tan.

In June 2024, Tan filed with the Ombudsman a graft case under R.A. No 3019, against Bacolod City government officers. The criminal lawsuit is anchored on alleged unlawful issuance of vendors' business license in a road right of way which obstructs his lot near the Burgos-Circumferential Road in Barangay Villamonte.

He conceptualized the Manok ni Cano Gwapo is a Guinness World Records verified largest chicken building. Unveiled on October 19, the giant rooster hotel in Campuestohan Highland Resort is a monument and memorial to Negros' cockfighting industry.
