= Philippine football clubs in Asian competitions =

Philippine clubs has been competing in Asian-level competitions as early as 1967.

== Overview ==
=== Participating clubs by tournament ===
Legend

- 1st – Champions
- 2nd – Runners-up
- SF – Semifinals
- IZSF – Inter-zonal semi-finals
- ZF – Zonal Final
- ZSF – Zonal Semi-finals
- GS – Group Stage
- R2 – Second Round
- R1 – First Round
- PO – Playoff Round
- PR2 – Preliminary Round 2
- PR1 – Preliminary Round 1
- PR – Preliminary Round
- Q – Qualified
- CXL – Cancelled
- WD – Withdrew

==== AFC Champions League (2002–2024) ====
Team	Qualified	2002–03–2016	2017	2018	2019	2020	2021	2022	2023–24
Ceres / United City	5	–	–	PO	PR1	PO	GS	GS	–
Global	1	–	PR2	–	–	–	–	–	–
Kaya	3	–	–	–	–	–	GS	PR	GS

==== Asian Club Championship (1985–2002) ====
Team	Qualified	1985–86	1986	1987	1988–89	1989–90	1990–91	1991	1991–93	1993–94	1994–95	1995	1996–97–2001–02
Davao City	1	–	–	–	–	–	–	–	–	–	R1	–	–
Pasay City	1	–	–	–	–	–	–	–	–	–	–	R2	–
Philippine Air Force	2	–	PR	–	–	PR	–	–	–	–	–	–	–
Philippine Army	1	–	–	–	–	–	–	–	–	PR	–	–	–

==== Asian Champion Club Tournament (1967, 1969–1971) ====
Team	Qualified	1967	1969	1970–1971
Manila Lions	1	–	GS	–

==== AFC Champions League 2 (2024–) ====
Team	Qualified	2024–25	2025–26
Cebu	1	GS	
Kaya	2	GS	TBD
Manila Digger	1		TBD

==== AFC Cup (2004–24) ====
Team	Qualified	2004–2014	2015	2016	2017	2018	2019	2020	2021	2022	2023–24
Cebu	1	–	–	–	–	–	–	–	–	–	GS
Ceres / United City	6	–	PO	R16	IZSF	ZF	ZSF	CXL	–	–	–
Global	3	–	GS	–	ZSF	GS	–	–	–	–	–
Kaya	4	–	–	R16	–	–	GS	CXL	–	GS	–
Stallion	1	–	–	–	–	–	–	–	–	–	GS

==== Asian Cup Winners' Cup (1990–2002) ====
Team	Qualified	1990–91	1991–92	1992–93	1993–94	1994–95–2001–02
Philippine Air Force	1	–	–	–	R1	–
Sinugba	0	–	WD	–	–	–

==== AFC President's Cup (2005–2014) ====
Team	Qualified	2005–2012	2013	2014
Ceres / United City	1	–	–	GS
Global	1	–	GS	–

==== ASEAN Club Championship (2003, 2005, 2022, 2024–) ====
Team	Qualified	2003	2005	2022	2024–25	2025–26
Cebu	1	–	–	–	–	TBD
Ceres / United City	0	–	–	CXL	–	–
Kaya	1	–	–	–	GS	–
National Capital Region	0	–	WD	–	–	–
Philippine Army	1	GS	–	–	–	–

==== Singapore Cup (1998–2019, 2022–) ====
Team	Invited	1998–2011	2012	2013	2014	2015	2016	2017	2018–2024-25
Ceres / United City	2	–	–	–	–	–	SF	R1	–
Global	5	–	–	SF	FR	SF	QF	RU	–
Loyola	3	–	SF	QF	QF	–	–	–	–

==== Menpora Cup (2013) ====
Team	Invited	2013
Loyola	1	FR

==== AFC Women's Champions League (2024–) ====
Team	Qualified	2024–25	2025–26
Kaya	1	GS	–
Stallion	1	–	TBD

==== T&T Cup International Women's Football Cup (2024) ====
Team	Invited	2024
Manila Digger	1	4th/04

==== SingaCup Women Football Championship (2022) ====
Team	Invited	2022
Kaya	1	1st/04

==== Ho Chi Minh City International Women Football Tournament (2015) ====
Team	Invited	2015
Far Eastern University	1	4th/04
