= Mariano Araneta =

Filipino businessman and footballer

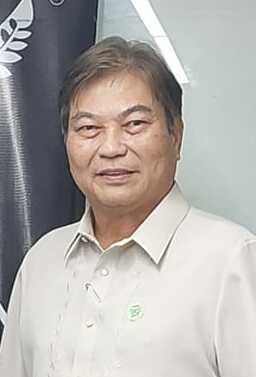
- Araneta in 2023

President of the Philippine Football Federation
- In office November 27, 2010 – November 25, 2023; Interim: November 27, 2010 – November 26, 2011
- Preceded by: Jose Mari Martinez
- Succeeded by: John Gutierrez

Personal details
- Born: Mariano V. Araneta, Jr. November 9, 1954 (age 71) Barotac Nuevo, Iloilo, Philippines
Association football career
Youth career
- –: Barotac Nuevo XI
College career
Years	Team	Apps	(Gls)
–1975	University of the Philippines		
Senior career*
Years	Team	Apps	(Gls)
–	U-Tex		
–	CDCP		
–	Philippine Air Force		
International career
1975–1985	Philippines		(~2)
Managerial career
- 1993: Philippines
- * Club domestic league appearances and goals
- Basketball career

Career information
- College: UP
- Position: Point guard
- Number: 8

Mariano "Nonong" V. Araneta, Jr. (born November 9, 1954) is a Filipino sports executive, businessman and retired footballer. Araneta formerly played for the Philippines national football team. He was the president of the Philippine Football Federation (PFF) from 2010 to 2023 and is currently a member of the FIFA Council since May 2017.

== Early life and education ==
Araneta was born on November 9, 1954, in Barotac Nuevo, Iloilo. He played for his town's team in province-wide football tournaments held during the summer and Christmas season during his childhood. For his high school studies, Araneta attended the University of the Philippines Iloilo. For his collegiate studies, he took up Civil Engineering at the Diliman campus of the University of the Philippines. He was a varsity player for both the university's basketball and football teams.

== Basketball career ==
Araneta played for the UP Fighting Maroons basketball team for three years in the 1970s. He played as a point guard due to his football background. He was offered to play for a farm team of Mariwasa, a team in the Manila Industrial and Commercial Athletic Association (MICAA), by UP Coach Felicisimo Fajardo so that after his graduation he would be part of the Mariwasa main team. However Araneta was not able to play in the MICAA when it was supplanted by the Philippine Basketball Association (PBA) in 1975 as the top-flight basketball league in the Philippines. He decided to focus on finishing his studies in UP over playing competitive basketball.

== Football career ==
=== Collegiate ===
Araneta helped the football team of the University of the Philippines win three titles.

=== Club ===
Araneta won his first National League Championship title as part of the U-Tex football team. He then transferred to CDCP where he won another National League title. He later won six more titles for Philippine Air Force F.C.

=== International ===
Araneta played for the Philippines national football team from 1975 to 1985. He was part of the Philippine squad that played at the 1977 and 1983 Southeast Asian Games. In 1983, he also played in the Asian football qualifiers for the 1984 Summer Olympics. On the 32nd minute of the second leg of the preliminary round against Japan, he scored the solitary goal for the Philippines.

==== International goals ====
Scores and results list the Philippines' goal tally first.

Date	Venue	Opponent	Score	Result	Competition
September 7, 1983	National Stadium, Tokyo	Japan	1–4	1–10	1984 Football Olympic Tournament - Asian Qualification
August 15, 1984	Senayan Sports Stadium, Jakarta	Iran	1–5	1–7	1984 AFC Asian Cup qualification

=== Coaching ===
He served as head coach of the Philippines at the 1993 Philippine International Football Cup which was hosted at the Paglaum Stadium.

=== Football administration ===
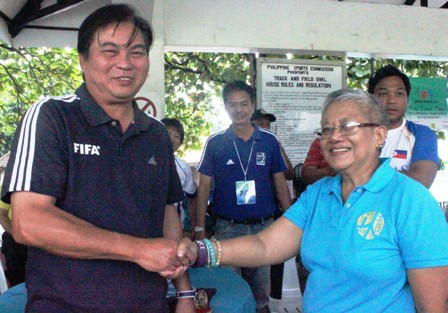
Araneta, on behalf of the national football team, meeting with Presidential Adviser on the Peace Process Teresita Quintos Deles for the Peace Month 2012 event.

Following the ouster of Jose Mari Martinez as the President of the Philippine Football Federation on November 27, 2010, Araneta was designated as the interim president of the football body. Almost a year later, Araneta was elected as president on November 26, 2011, at a PFF congress held at the Astoria Plaza in Pasig. He secured a second term in 2015.

In February 2017, it was reported that Araneta was one of the then eight candidates vying for the Asian Football Confederation's (AFC) four spots at the FIFA Council. The four successful candidates were to be determined at the AFC Congress in May 2017 in Bahrain. Three posts were in contention for male candidates while a single post for female candidates. On May 8, 2017, Araneta along with Zhang Jian of China and Chung Mong-gyu of South Korea secured their post by acclamation while Mahfuza Akhter Kiron of Bangladesh secured the sole FIFA Council slot in contention for women.

On November 29, 2019, Araneta won a third term as PFF President in the elections held during the 16th PFF Congress. He was challenged by Negros Occidental Football Association President Ricky Yanson for the post. Araneta secured 23 votes from the PFF voting members in contrast to Yanson's 12.

During his presidency, the Philippines men's national team qualified for the 2019 AFC Asian Cup, the country's first major tournament participation in men's football. The Philippines women's national team, meanwhile, qualified for the 2023 FIFA Women's World Cup in January 2022, the first time the country qualified for a FIFA World Cup of any gender. The women's team also won the 2022 AFF Women's Championship, the Philippines' first major title in senior international football.

Mariano Araneta after a friendly game between the Philippines and Afghanistan. 2023.

On February 2, 2023, the AFC re-elected Araneta to another four-year term as a representative of the confederation in the FIFA Council. Bound by term limits, Araneta left his position as PFF President on November 25, 2023. He was succeeded by John Gutierrez, though he retains his role as FIFA council member and ASEAN Football Federation vice president.

== Other sports ==
Mariano served as the chef de mission of the Philippine delegation for the 2020 Summer Olympics in Tokyo, the country's most successful performance at the tournament with weightlifter Hidilyn Diaz winning the country's first-ever Olympic gold medal.
