= Philippines women's national futsal team =

Philippines
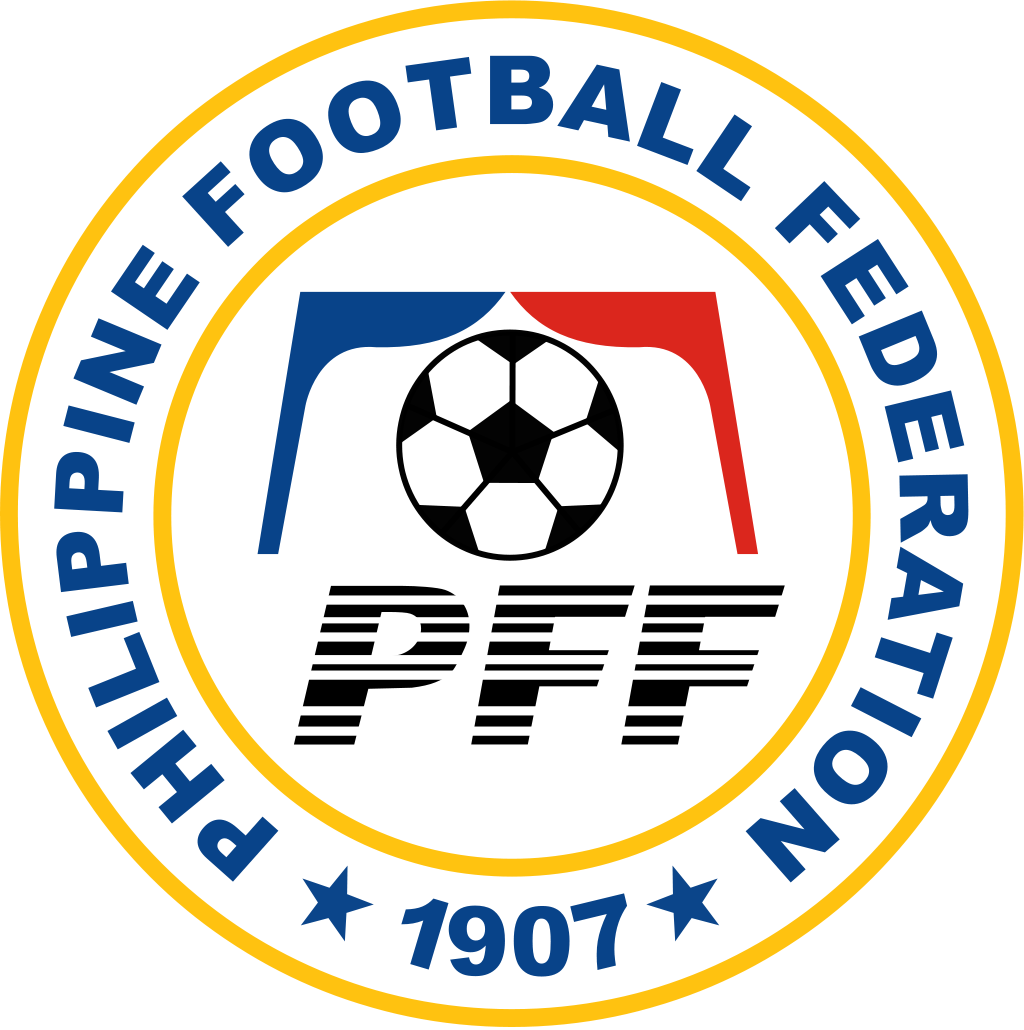
- Shirt badge/Association crest
- Nickname(s): Filipina5
- Association: Philippine Football Federation (PFF)
- Confederation: AFC (Asia)
- Head coach: Rafa Merino
- Captain: Isabella Flanigan
- FIFA code: PHI
- FIFA ranking: 66 (September 24, 2026)
- Highest FIFA ranking: 55 (April 4, 2025)
- Lowest FIFA ranking: 69 (December 12, 2025)
Home colors	Away colors

First international
- Philippines 1–8 Thailand (Bangkok, Thailand; November 13, 2005)

Biggest win
- Malaysia 2–5 Philippines (Macau; October 31, 2007); Laos 1–4 Philippines (Bangkok, Thailand; December 9, 2007); Kuwait 1–4 Philippines (Tashkent, Uzbekistan; January 11, 2025)

Biggest defeat
- Iran 18–2 Philippines (Macau; November 2, 2007)

FIFA Futsal Women's World Cup
- Appearances: 1 (First in 2025)
- Best result: Group Stage (2025)

Asian Cup
- Appearances: 1 (First in 2025)
- Best result: Group stage (2025)

Southeast Asian Games
- Appearances: 3 (First in 2007)
- Best result: Third place (2007)

The Philippines women's national futsal team represents the Philippines in international futsal competitions and is controlled by the Philippine Futsal Committee of the Philippine Football Federation.

== History ==
=== Batungbacal team (2005–2007) ===
A Philippines women's futsal team was formed under Emmanuel Batungbacal five months prior to the 2005 Asian Indoor Games, their first international tournament.

Batungbacal first came into contact with Philippine Football Federation. At that time Johnny Romualdez was the federation president and former Ateneo player Domeka Garamenda was the secretary general. Batungbacal was given the green light to form a team but he had to rely on his funding. The team finished fourth place in the Asian Indoor Games. They later joined the 2007 Southeast Asian Games where they overcame Malaysia in the bronze medal game.

In 2007, José Mari Martínez would succeed Romualdez as PFF president. In 2009, the federation was riddled with controversy. The PFF Futsal Committee head Esmaeil Sedigh recommended Batungbacal's removal as head coach in early 2009, which prompted the resignation of the women's futsal team's players. Batungbacal was allegedly removed for sending an unsanctioned women's futsal squad to the Vikings Futsal Cup in New Zealand although the coach presented a PFF document contradicting this claim. Martinez cites the coach's lack of coaching credentials for the move.

=== Sedigh team (2011) ===
Esmaeil Sedigh became the women's futsal coach. He led the team at the 2011 Southeast Asian Games.

=== Hermans program (2020–2024) ===
Dutch former player and coach Victor Hermans was brought in by the PFF in 2020 to serve as a technical consultant for futsal.

Hermans focused initially on the women's team and formed the core of the new team from players hailing from the Tuloy sa Don Bosco Foundation. The squad would train despite the COVID-19 pandemic. In 2022, the new women's futsal team was unveiled adopting the moniker "Pinay5". The team took part at the Pinay5 Futsal Faceoff, a two-game friendly series with Guam. They lost the first game 0–1, but won the second one 3–1.

The Philippines was announced to host the inaugural FIFA Futsal Women's World Cup to be held in 2025 consequently qualifying its national team for the tournament.

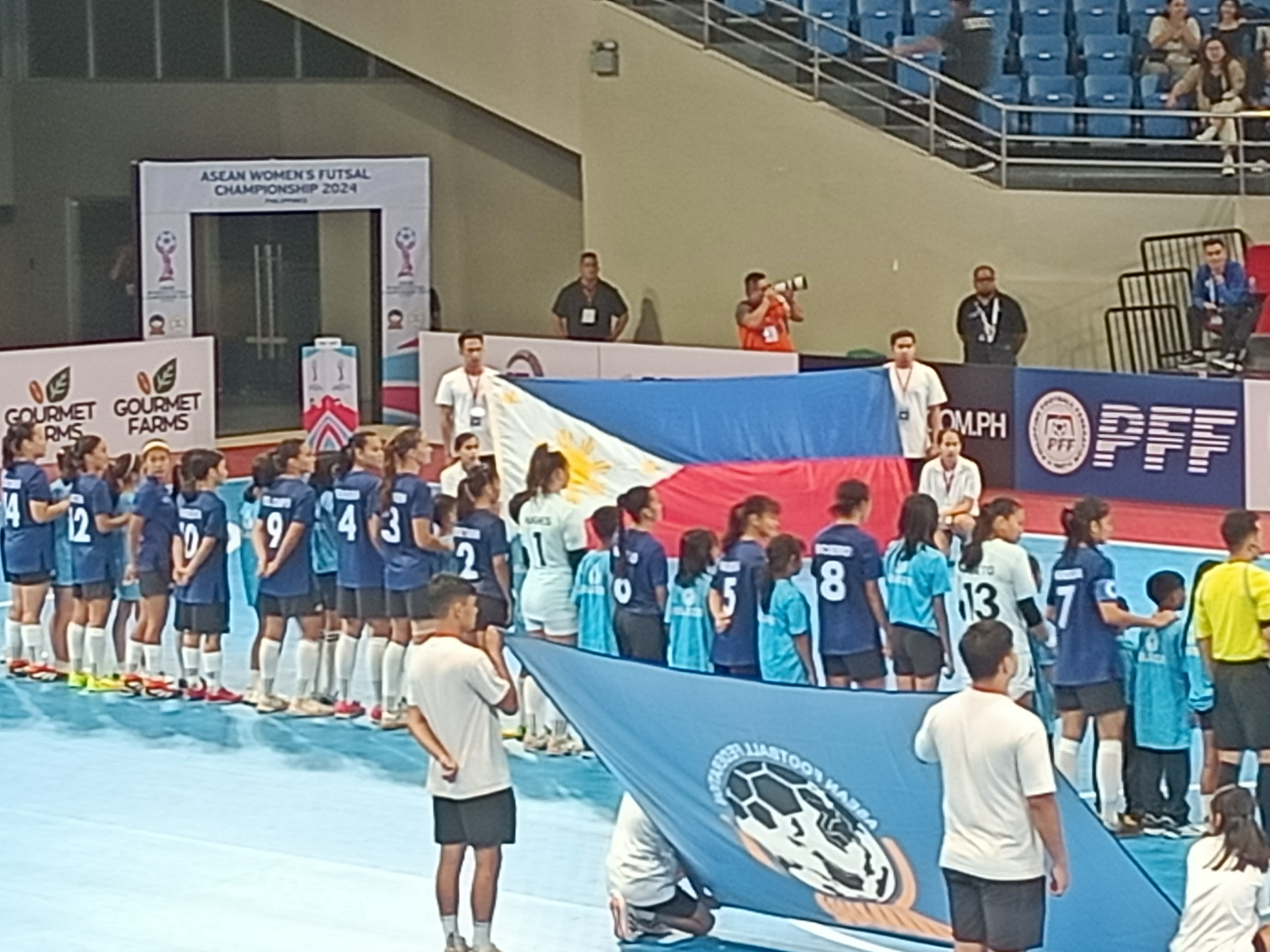
Philippines at the 2024 ASEAN Women's Futsal Championship

Its first tournament as part of its preparation is the 2024 ASEAN Women's Futsal Championship in Pasig. The team was formed through scouting during High 5 Futsal League season and with a few players scouted outside of the country. The hosts narrowly missed a place in the third place playoff of the five-team tournament after losing 1–2 to their final group stage opponent Indonesia. They only needed a draw to advance.

However, in December 2024, Hermans was reportedly removed from his position and "realigned" with the men's program. Key players announced their resignation from the team due to alleged 'chaos' and 'disorganization' of top PFF officials. This included the PFF trying to arrange a short-notice training camp, without the Head Coach, and telling players they would be cut if they did not go to this short notice camp scheduled for December 26, despite several players already being out of Manila, as well as a push towards including more players from a footballing background whom they believed were better athletes despite lacking futsal experience.

Team manager Danny Moran was also removed from the team, though he maintained support for Hermans and together they pushed through with the originally scheduled Pinay5 training camp in January 2024, and their futsal programs.

=== Merino program (2025–present) ===
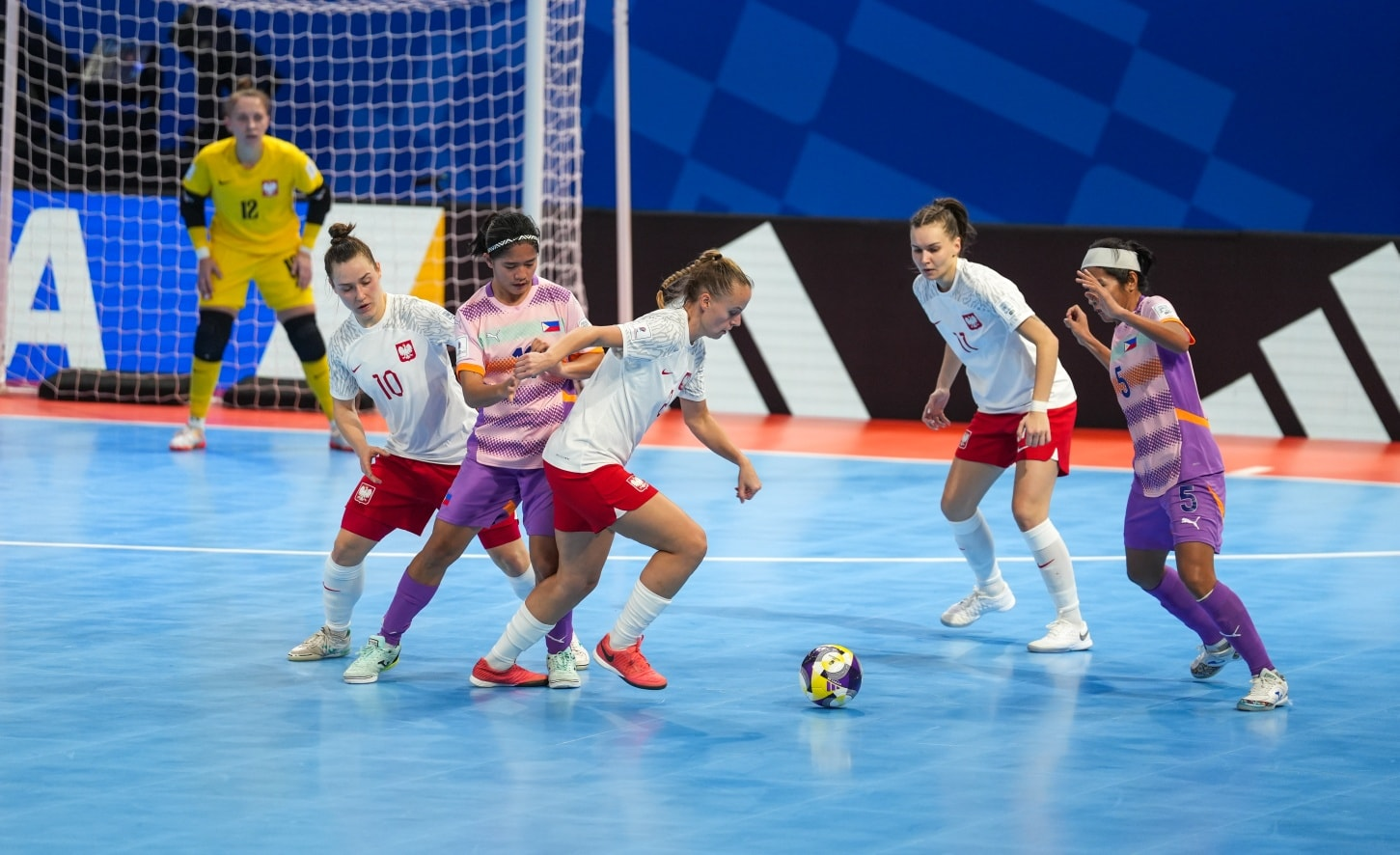
Philippines vs. Poland at the 2025 FIFA Futsal Women's World Cup.

The PFF hired Spanish coach Rafa Merino Rodriguez as the new head coach of the women's team in December 2024. His appointment was announced in January 2025 with a new pool of players announced for the 2025 AFC Women's Futsal Asian Cup qualifiers Only five players are holdovers from Hermans' team. In the relevant press conference PFF President John Gutierrez has requested the media not to discuss controversies which unfolded in late 2024 until the tournament is over. Moran demanded the PFF desist from using "Pinay 5" in subsequent official PFF events, alleging a breach of contract.

The Philippines qualified for the 2025 AFC Women's Futsal Asian Cup in China as the best third-place team. They however failed to progress out of the group stage in their debut appearance.

They had training camps in Japan and Spain in preparation for the inaugural 2025 World Cup. The Philippines lost all of their three games to Poland (0–6), Morocco (2–3), and Argentina (1–5). Their closest result was with Morocco and was leading 2–0 before their eventual defeat.

== Team image ==
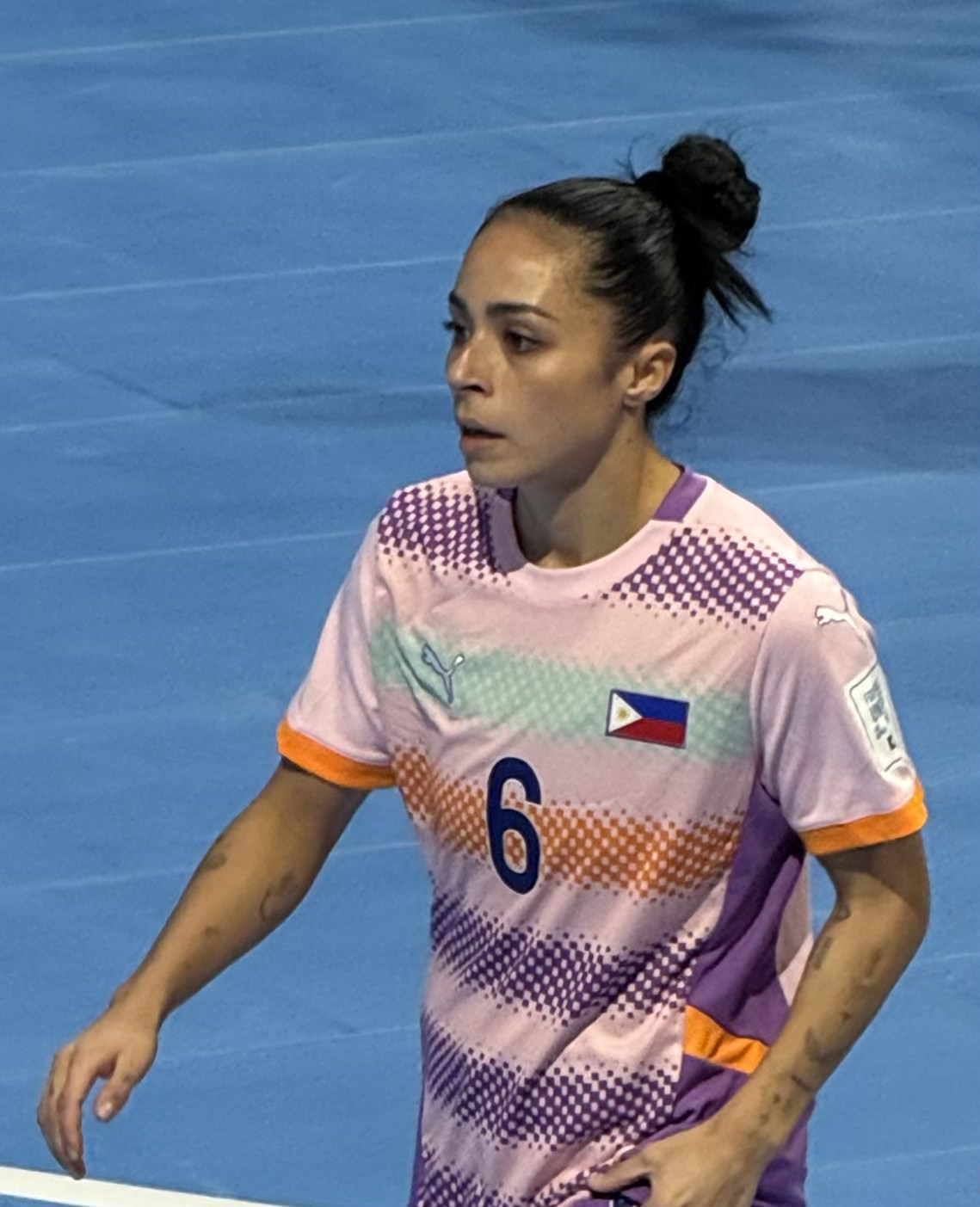
Jaclyn Sawicki wearing the 2026 Puma pink away kit at the 2025 FIFA Futsal Women's World Cup

The Philippines women's national team is known by the moniker Filipina5 which was formally introduced by the PFF in April 2025. Previously the team was known as Pinay 5 when it was under the sponsorship of the Moran Foundation. The moniker, also a trademark owned by its backers, was dropped in January 2025.

Their current kit provider is Puma. The women's national futsal team first used the 2026 set introduced by Puma in November 2025 at the 2025 FIFA Futsal Women's World Cup. It consists of a blue kit for the home colors and pink kit exclusive for the women's side for the away colors.

== Fixtures and results ==
The following is a list of match results in the last 12 months, as well as any future matches that have been scheduled.

Win Draw Lose Fixture

=== 2025 ===
November 21 2025 FIFA Futsal Women's World Cup	Philippines	0–6	Poland	Pasig, Philippines
20:30 UTC+8		Report	Basta 6'19", 23'55"; Matuszewska 18'18"; Szostak 22'18"; Ortillo 25'50", o.g.; Dymińska 29'53"	Stadium: PhilSports Arena; Attendance: 2,211; Referee: Anelize Schulz (Brazil)

November 24 2025 FIFA Futsal Women's World Cup	Philippines	2–3	Morocco	Pasig, Philippines
20:30 UTC+8	Tolentin 3'53"; Graversen 7'1"	Report	Laftah 9'47"; Tadlaoui 13'55"; Demraoui 16'56"	Stadium: PhilSports Arena; Attendance: 1,771; Referee: Alice Vevodova (Czech Republic)

November 27 2025 FIFA Futsal Women's World Cup	Argentina	5–1	Philippines	Pasig, Philippines
20:30 UTC+8	Villalba 1'35"; Romero 3'15"; Natta 3'57"; Chiesa 6'07"; Quevedo 6'56"	Report	Bandoja 27'24"	Stadium: PhilSports Arena; Attendance: 2,811; Referee: Krystin Pahia (United States)

December 12 2025 SEA Games GS	Thailand	7–1	Philippines	Samut Prakan, Thailand
16:30 UTC+9		Report		Stadium: Bangkokthonburi University Gymnasium

December 13 2025 SEA Games GS	Philippines	3–1	Malaysia	Samut Prakan, Thailand
16:30 UTC+9		Report		Stadium: Bangkokthonburi University Gymnasium

December 16 2025 SEA Games SF	Vietnam	1–0	Philippines	Samut Prakan, Thailand
16:30 UTC+9	Trần Nguyệt Vi 25'	Report		Stadium: Bangkokthonburi University Gymnasium

December 18 2025 SEA Games Bronze medal match	Thailand	5–0	Philippines	Samut Prakan, Thailand
13:30 UTC+9				Stadium: Bangkokthonburi University Gymnasium

=== 2026 ===
February 24 2026 ASEAN Women's Futsal Championship	Myanmar	0–1	Philippines	Nakhon Ratchasima, Thailand
16:00 UTC+7		Report	Tolentin 14'	Stadium: Terminal 21 Korat; Referee: Panadda Khotsenaphattra (Thailand)

February 25 2026 ASEAN Women's Futsal Championship	Philippines	0–2	Vietnam	Nakhon Ratchasima, Thailand
13:30 UTC+7		Report	Lê Thị Thanh Ngân 5'; Biện Thị Hằng 37'	Stadium: Terminal 21 Korat; Referee: Misaki Kawamorita (Japan)

February 26 2026 ASEAN Women's Futsal Championship	Philippines	1–1	Australia	Nakhon Ratchasima, Thailand
16:00 UTC+9	Borres 40'	Report	Holder 40'	Stadium: Terminal 21 Korat; Referee: Khampasong Xayavongsy (Laos)

== Players ==
=== Current squad ===
The following 14 players were named to the squad for the 2026 ASEAN Women's Futsal Championship.

Caps and goals updated as of November 27, 2025, after the match against Argentina.

No.	Pos.	Player	Date of birth (age)	Caps	Goals	Club
	GK	Samantha Hughes	May 21, 2008 (age 18)	15	0	(Football Australia) Sala Time
	GK	Kayla Santiago	August 4, 2001 (age 25)	5	0	(Philippine Football Federation) UA&P
	DF	Cathrine Graversen	April 25, 1998 (age 28)	14	1	(Danish Football Association) B.93
	DF	Rocelle Mendaño	May 19, 2000 (age 26)	10	0	(Philippine Football Federation) Kaya–Iloilo
	DF	Sheen Borres	January 2, 1998 (age 28)	4	0	(Philippine Football Federation) Kaya–Iloilo
	MF	Charisa Lemoran	September 21, 1998 (age 28)	7	0	(Philippine Football Federation) Stallion Laguna
	MF	Lyka Cuenco	October 30, 2003 (age 23)	1	0	(Philippine Football Federation) Kaya–Iloilo
	MF	Vrendelle Nuera	August 25, 2004 (age 22)	13	0	(Philippine Football Federation) GK SipaG
	MF	Janly Fontamillas	January 24, 2000 (age 26)	0	0	(Philippine Football Federation) Kaya–Iloilo
	MF	Joyce Gemberva		0	0	
	MF	Jaycee DeFazio	January 3, 2005 (age 21)	1	0	(United States Soccer Federation) Cal Poly Mustangs
	DF	Rhea Chan	September 24, 2000 (age 26)	1	0	(Philippine Football Federation) Stallion Laguna
	MF	Sarahgen Tulabing		0	0	(Philippine Football Federation) FEU
	FW	Dionesa Tolentin	June 25, 2000 (age 26)	11	5	(Philippine Football Federation) Kaya–Iloilo

=== Recent call-ups ===
The following players have been called up for the Philippines within the past 12 months.

Pos.	Player	Date of birth (age)	Caps	Goals	Club	Latest call-up
GK	Yasmin Elauria	February 17, 2000 (age 26)	1	0	(Philippines) FEU	v. Spain, November 8, 2025
FW	Isabella Bandoja	March 30, 2001 (age 25)	15	6	(Hong Kong) TSL	2025 SEA Games
MF	Lanie Ortillo	April 8, 2005 (age 21)	15	2	(Hong Kong) TSL	2025 SEA Games
FW	Regine Rebosora	September 21, 2001 (age 25)	8	0	(Philippines) FEU	2025 SEA Games
	Alisha del Campo	September 20, 1999 (age 27)	13	2	(Philippines) Kaya–Iloilo	2025 FIFA Futsal Women's World Cup
	Isabella Flanigan (captain)	February 22, 2005 (age 21)	11	2	(Australia) Cockburn Wolves	2025 FIFA Futsal Women's World Cup
	Judy Connolly	July 26, 2003 (age 23)	11	1	(Australia) Cockburn Wolves	2025 FIFA Futsal Women's World Cup
	Katrina Guillou	December 19, 1993 (age 32)	7	4	(United States) DC Power	2025 FIFA Futsal Women's World Cup
	Jaclyn Sawicki	November 14, 1992 (age 34)	4	0	(Canada) Calgary Wild	2025 FIFA Futsal Women's World Cup
^{INJ} Withdrew due to an injury^{PRE} Included in the preliminary squad^{RET} Retired from the national team^{SUS} Serving suspension

== Tournament record ==
=== FIFA Futsal Women's World Cup ===
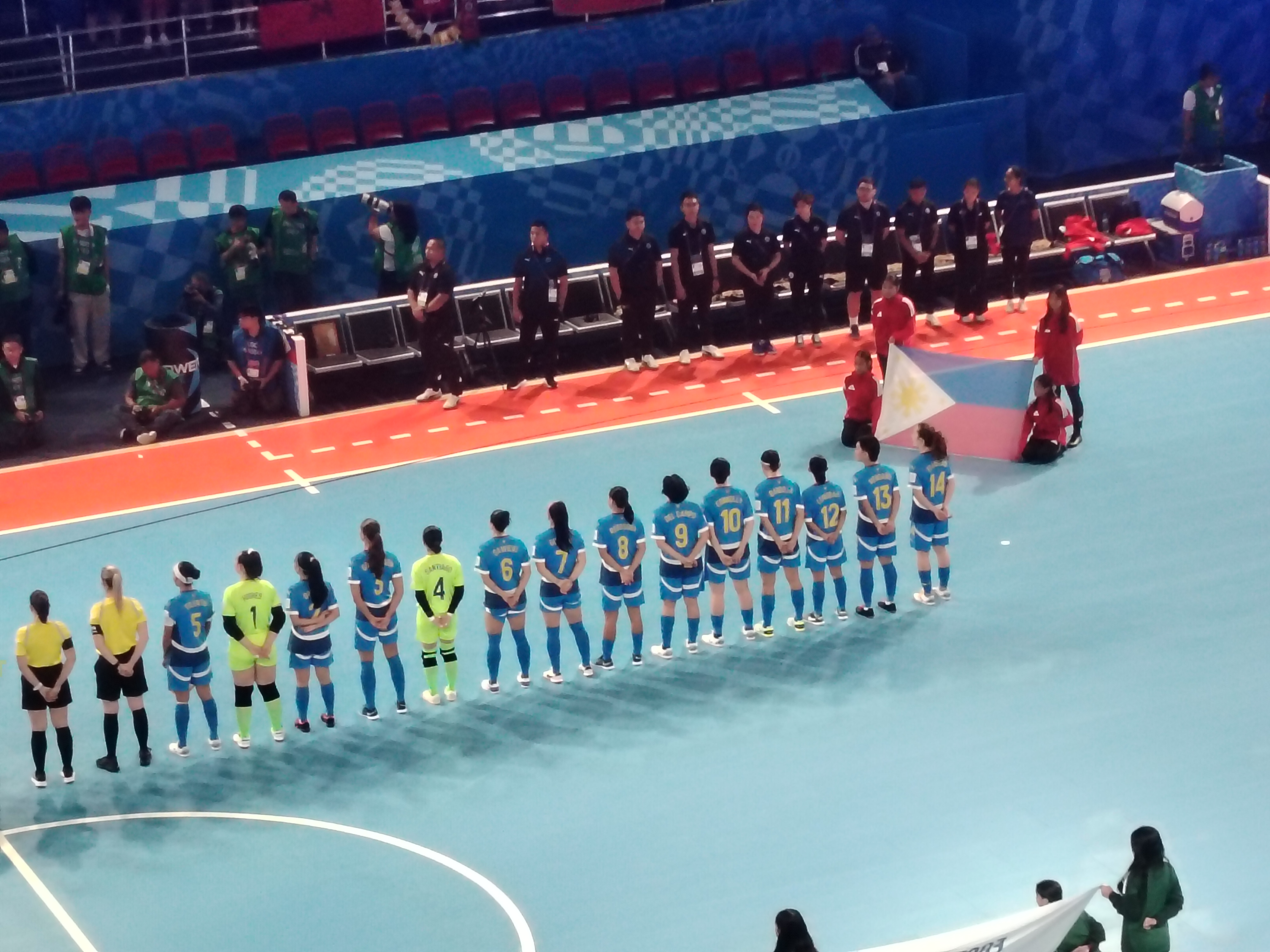
Philippines at the 2025 FIFA Futsal Women's World Cup

FIFA Futsal Women's World Cup record
Year	Round	Position	GP	W	D	L	GS	GA
(Philippines) 2025	Group stage	13/16	3	0	0	3	3	14
2029								
Total	Group stage	1/1	0	0	0	3	3	14

=== AFC Women's Futsal Asian Cup ===
AFC Women's Futsal Asian Cup record
Year	Round	Position	GP	W	D	L	GS	GA
(Malaysia) 2015	Did not enter							
(Thailand) 2018	Did not enter							
(China) 2025	Group stage	11/12	3	0	0	3	3	11
2028								
Total	–	0/1	3	0	0	3	3	11

=== Asian Indoor and Martial Arts Games ===
Asian Indoor and Martial Arts Games record
Year	Round	Position	GP	W	D	L	GS	GA
(Thailand) 2005	Group stage	4/4	3	0	0	3	3	25
(Macau) 2007	Placing	6/7	4	1	0	3	11	33
(Vietnam) 2009	Did not enter							
(South Korea) 2013	Did not enter							
(Turkmenistan) 2017	Did not enter							
(Thailand) 2021	Cancelled							
(Saudi Arabia) 2026	To be determined							
Total	–	2/5	7	1	0	6	14	58

=== ASEAN Women's Futsal Championship ===
ASEAN Women's Futsal Championship record
Year	Round	Position	GP	W	D	L	GS	GA
(Philippines) 2024	Group stage	5/5	4	0	1	3	4	17
(Thailand) 2026	Group stage	5/7	3	1	1	1	2	3
Total	Group stage	2/2	7	1	2	4	6	20

=== Southeast Asian Games ===
Southeast Asian Games record
Year	Round	Position	GP	W	D	L	GS	GA
(Thailand) 2007	Third place	3/6	6	2	0	2	11	14
(Laos) 2009	No competition as not officially selected by host							
(Indonesia) 2011	Group stage	5/5	4	0	0	4	8	27
(Myanmar) 2013	Did not enter							
(Singapore) 2015	No competition selected by host							
(Malaysia) 2017	Did not enter							
(Philippines) 2019	No competition selected by host							
(Vietnam) 2021	Did not enter							
(Cambodia) 2023	No competition selected by host							
(Thailand) 2025	Fourth place	4/6	4	1	0	3	4	14
Total	Third place	3/6	14	3	0	9	23	55

=== Other tournaments ===
Vikings Futsal Cup New Zealand

- 2008 Christchurch – Fourth Place
- 2009 Christchurch – Did not enter (Note: The women's national team competed under the name IROK Philippines at the Vikings Futsal Cup. After the national team under coach Emmanuel Batungbacal was sacked by the Philippine Football Federation after the team competed at the tournament allegedly without the sanction of the federation. The former national team renamed itself as IROK Philippines Futsal Club in 2009 planning to compete in the 2009 edition of the Vikings Futsal Cup.)

PFF Women's Tri Nation Futsal Invitational

- 2023 Manila – (silver) 2nd Place

== Coaching staff ==
=== Current coaching staff ===
Position	Name
Head coach	(Spain) Rafael Merino Rodriguez
Assistant coaches	(Philippines) Ariston Bocalan
Assistant coaches	(Spain) Alejandro De Pedro Heras

=== Coaching history ===
- (Philippines) Emmanuel Batungbacal (2005–2009)
- (Iran) Esmaeil Sedigh (c. 2011)
- (Netherlands) Victor Hermans (2022–2024)
- (Spain) Rafa Merino (2024–)

== See also ==
- Futsal in the Philippines
- Philippines women's national football team
