= Cathrine Graversen =

Filipino footballer (born 1998)

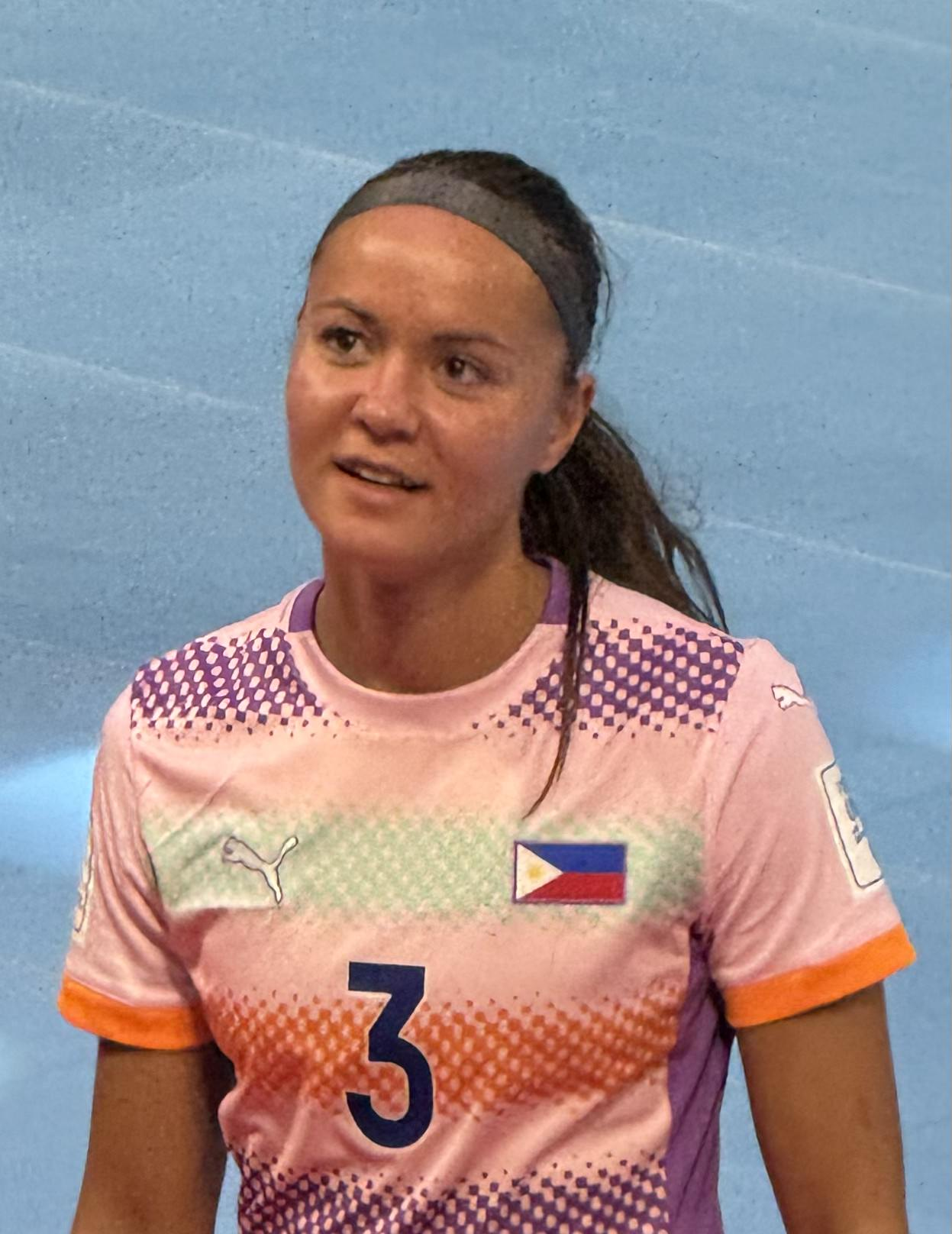
- Graversen at the 2025 FIFA Futsal Women's World Cup

Personal information
- Full name: Cathrine Buccat Graversen
- Date of birth: 25 April 1998 (age 28)
- Place of birth: Holbæk, Denmark
- Height: 1.70 m (5 ft 7 in)
- Positions: Defender; midfielder

Team information
- Current team: B.93
- Number: 3

Youth career
- 2009–2011: Vipperød Boldklub
- 2014–2016: Ballerup-Skovlunde
- 2016–2018: Kolding

Senior career*
Years	Team	Apps	(Gls)
2018	Ballerup-Skovlunde	24	(1)
2019	B.93	19	(1)
2019–2020	Ballerup-Skovlunde	18	(1)
2020	Calcio Pomigliano	10	(0)
2021	B.93	19	(1)
2021–2022	Nea Salamis	24	(4)
2022	IK Uppsala	4	(0)
2023	Odense Q	3	(0)
2023	Shelbourne	1	(0)
2024	Asya Spor	1	(0)
2019	B.93	0	(0)

International career^{‡}
2019–	Philippines	2	(0)
2024–	Philippines (futsal)	14	(1)
- * Club domestic league appearances and goals as of 27 November 2025 ‡ National team caps and goals as of 17 June 2022

Cathrine Buccat Graversen (born 25 April 1998) is a footballer who plays as a defender for Danish club B.93. Born in Denmark, she represents the Philippines at the international level for football and futsal.

== Career ==
=== Youth ===
Graversen had her youth career at Vipperød Boldklub, Ballerup-Skovlunde and Kolding.

=== Ballerup-Skovlunde ===
In 2018, Graversen returned to Ballerup-Skovlunde. She made her debut for the club in a 5–0 defeat against Brøndby, coming in as a substitute replacing Isabell Nederby in the 78th minute.

=== B.93 Pigefodbold ===
Graversen joined B.93 Pigefodbold in the spring of 2019.

=== Return to Ballerup-Skovlunde ===
After a short stint with B.93, she returned to Ballerup-Skovlunde.

=== Calcio Pomigliano ===
In October 2020, Graversen joined Italian Serie B club Calcio Pomigliano.

=== Return to B.93 Pigefodbold ===
Five months later, Graversen returned to B.93.

=== Nea Salamis ===
In the summer of 2021, Graversen joined Cypriot First Division club Nea Salamis.

=== IK Uppsala ===
In 2022, it was announced that Graversen joined Elitettan club IK Uppsala.

=== Shelbourne ===
In August 2023, Graversen signed for League of Ireland Women's Premier Division club Shelbourne until the remainder of the 2023 season.

=== Asya Spor ===
In January 2024, after a short stint in Ireland, Graversen joined Turkish Women's Football Super League club Asya Spor.

== International career ==
Born in Denmark, Graversen is eligible to represent either Denmark or the Philippines at the international level.

=== Philippines ===
As early as 2017, Graversen was invited to a national team training camp in California, United States. However, one month before the training camp, she caught a concussion, which prevented her from joining the camp. Two years later, Graversen made her debut for the Philippines in a 11–0 friendly win against Macau.

In 2019, Graversen was one of the 20 players that were called up for the 2019 Southeast Asian Games held in Manila.

Graversen was included in the Philippine national futsal team which competed in the 2024 ASEAN Women's Futsal Championship and the 2025 FIFA Futsal Women's World Cup, the inaugural edition of the tournament hosted by the Philippines. On 24 November 2025, she scored the team's second goal against Morocco during their second group-stage match at the World Cup, which was also her first international goal. However, Morocco went on to win the match 3–2.

== Career statistics ==
=== International goals ===
==== Futsal ====
Scores and results list the Philippines' goal tally first, score column indicates score after each Graversen goal.

No.	Date	Venue	Opponent	Score	Result	Competition	Ref.
1.	24 November 2025	PhilSports Arena, Pasig, Philippines	Morocco	2–0	2–3	2025 FIFA Futsal Women's World Cup	
