= Esmaeil Sedigh =

Iranian futsal coach and instructor

Esmaeil Sedigh is an Iranian futsal coach and instructor. He was a former football player in U21 1st division in Iran.

He has held the position of futsal department director under the Philippine Football Federation. Sedigh is known for his contributions in the development of Philippines national futsal team.

== Coaching background ==
He started as an assistant futsal coach in 2005, and the head coach of the Philippines from 2007 until 2012. During his coaching stint in the international arena, he has led Philippines to final round of the 2007 AFC Futsal Championship in Osaka, Japan after qualifying round in Taipei. He also led the team to 4th place in the AFF Futsal Championship 2009 and 2010.

== Futsal instructor ==
He had held several futsal coaching courses all over the Philippines under the Philippine Football Federation (PFF) and AFC level 1 futsal coaching course under the Asian Football Confederation (AFC).

== Local futsal competitions ==
He initiated the inclusion of Futsal Sports in the Philippine National Games (since 2011), Batang Pinoy Youth Games (since 2013) and the more recent Palarong Pambansa (as demo sports 2013), Organized and Sponsored by the Philippine Sports Commission (PSC), Philippine Olympic Committee (POC) and Department of Education (DepEd).

== Cups and Leagues ==
Sedigh founded the Philippine Futsal League.
