= Victor Hermans =

Dutch futsal coach (born 1953)

Vic Hermans
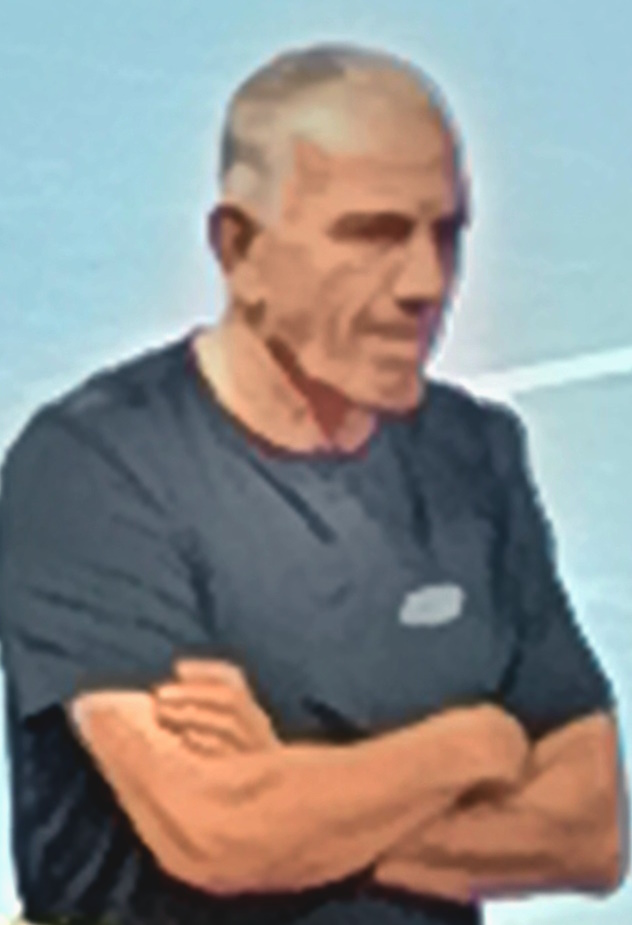
- Hermans in 2024

Personal information
- Full name: Victor Jacobus Hermans
- Date of birth: 17 March 1953 (age 73)
- Place of birth: Maastricht, Netherlands
- Height: 1.72 m (5 ft 8 in)

Senior career*
Years	Team	Apps	(Gls)
- MVV
- Tongeren

International career
1978–1989	Netherlands (futsal)	45	(23)

Managerial career
- 1990–1992: Netherlands (assistant)
- 1992–1996: Hong Kong
- 1996: Malaysia
- 1997–2000: Netherlands (assistant)
- 2001: Iran
- 2001–2007: Netherlands
- 2009–2011: Malta
- 2012–2016: Thailand
- 2017–2018: Indonesia
- 2018–2020: Malta
- 2022–2024: Philippines (women's)
- 2025–: Pinay5 FC
- * Club domestic league appearances and goals

Victor Jacobus Hermans (born 17 March 1953 in Maastricht) is a Dutch futsal coach who has managed 6 different national teams and guided 3 to the FIFA Futsal World Cup.

== Futsal career ==
=== Playing ===
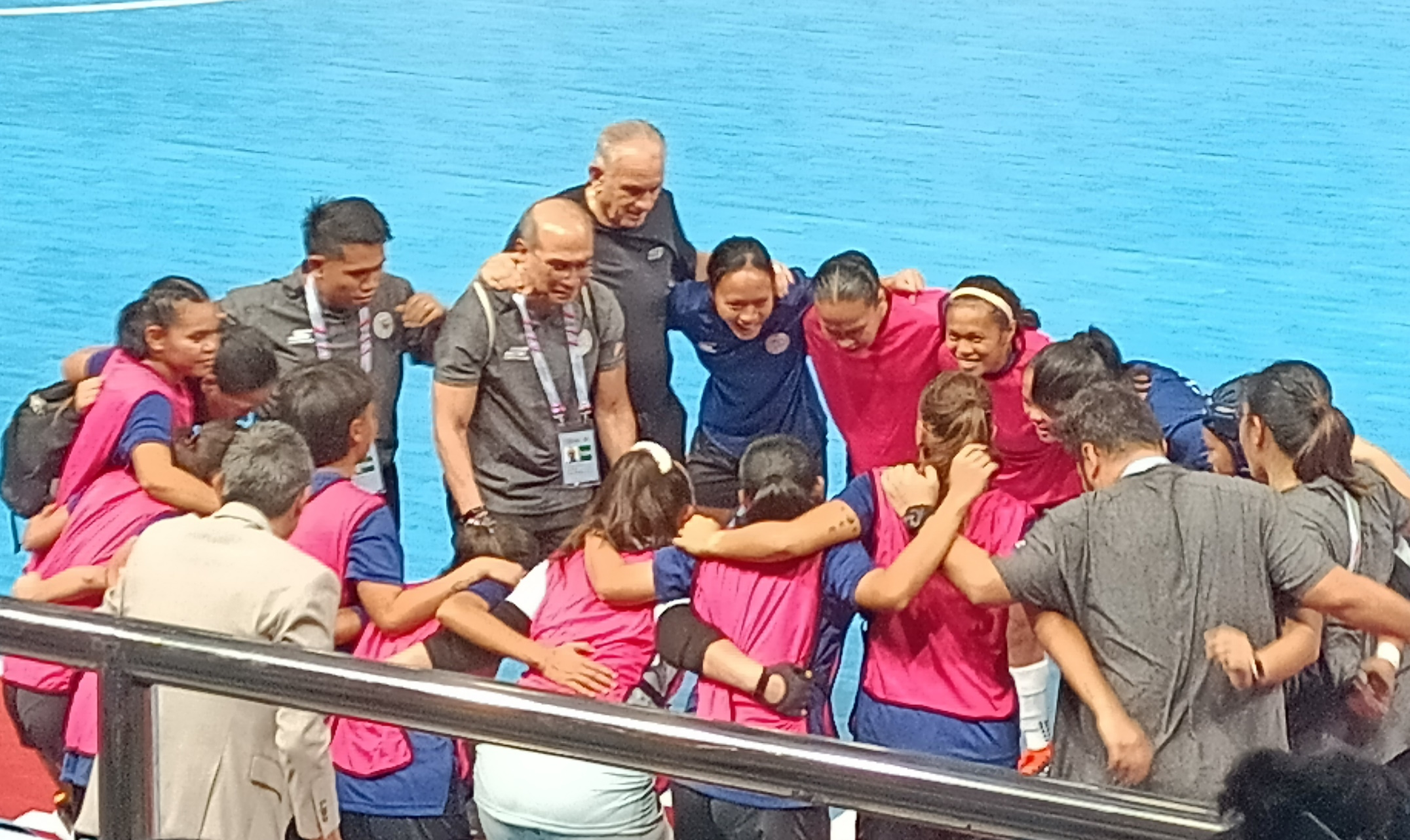
Hermans in a huddle with the Philippine women's national team during their match against Myanmar at the 2024 ASEAN Women's Futsal Championship.

Hermans started his career by playing outdoor football for his hometown when he was a teenager. He later moved to Belgium to play for Tongeren. After he left Belgium, he moved back into his own country to play for Caesar Beek. He represented his country 45 times and participated in four international tournaments, including the 1989 FIFA Futsal World Championship where his team was runner-up, losing at the final to Brazil.

=== Managing ===
He decided to retire in 1990 and joined the Oranje as an assistant coach for two years. Later, he was appointed as the Hong Kong manager. He managed Hong Kong in their first world cup as a host nation. They played Nigeria and Poland, ending their tournament in the group stage. He later went to manage Malaysia for one year, leaving after they lost all of 1996 World Cup matches.

After leaving Malaysia, he went back to be assistant coach of the Netherlands, for three years. He then became the head coach of Iran for one year, with a 100 percent wins in seven matches. They became the champions of Asia in 2001 Asian Championship. Hermans then managed Netherlands for six years. Despite failing to take them to any world cup, he took them to the European championship and a Grand Prix tournament in Brazil. After having disappointing results in both tournaments, he left as head coach in 2007. He later joined Malta as the head coach for two years, but without major impact.

Hermans in 2020 reportedly agreed to become the Philippine Football Federation's technical consultant for futsal, helping create a groundwork for the Philippine futsal program. He also become head coach of the relaunched Philippines women's national team in 2022. Meanwhile, he was technical consultant of India national futsal team in 2023. He was at the time confirmed as Philippines' coach for the upcoming inaugural 2025 FIFA Futsal Women's World Cup.

However in 23 December 2024, Hermans was reportedly removed from his position for the team's performance at the 2024 ASEAN Women's Futsal Championship and was "realigned" with the men's program.

Hermans in 2025 became coach of the Pinay5 Futsal Club of the High 5 Futsal League.

== International goals ==
No.	Date	Venue	Opponent	Score	Result	Competition
1.	5 January 1989	Rotterdam, Netherlands	Denmark	4–2	4–2	1989 FIFA Futsal World Championship
2.	10 January 1989	Rotterdam, Netherlands	Hungary	2–0	3–3	1989 FIFA Futsal World Championship
3.	10 January 1989	Rotterdam, Netherlands	Hungary	3–1	3–3	1989 FIFA Futsal World Championship
4.	11 January 1989	Arnhem, Netherlands	Italy	1–1	4–1	1989 FIFA Futsal World Championship
5.	14 January 1989	Rotterdam, Netherlands	United States	1–0	2–1	1989 FIFA Futsal World Championship
6.	14 January 1989	Rotterdam, Netherlands	United States	2–1	2–1	1989 FIFA Futsal World Championship

== Achievements ==
=== Manager ===
Iran

- AFC Futsal Championship: 2001

Thailand

- AFC Futsal Championship: Runner-up 2012, third place 2016
- Asian Indoor and Martial Arts Games: Bronze medal 2013
- AFF Futsal Championship: 2012, 2013, 2014, 2015
- SEA Games: Gold medal 2013
