= Enderun Colleges =

Private college in Taguig, Philippines

- Type: Private, non-sectarian higher education institution
- Established: 2005
- Founders: Jack Tuason; Javier Infante; John Suits
- Affiliations: NAASCU
- President: Demetrio Salipsip Jr., MBA, PhD
- Academic staff: 150+
- Location: Taguig, Metro Manila, Philippines
- Campus: Urban
- Colors: Burgundy and Bronze
- Nickname: Enderun Titans
- Website: www.enderuncolleges.com

Enderun Colleges is a private, non-sectarian higher education institution located in McKinley Hill, Taguig, Metro Manila, Philippines. Established in 2005, the institution offers undergraduate degree programs in business, hospitality, entrepreneurship, economics, architecture, interior design, and multimedia arts. The college emphasizes experiential learning, international academic collaborations, and industry-based internships integrated into its academic programs.

== History ==
Enderun Colleges was established in 2005 by business and community leaders Jack Tuason, Javier Infante, and John Suits, who had previously founded Ambergris Solutions, later known as TELUS International Philippines. They were subsequently joined by Daniel Perez, a graduate of Les Roches International School of Hotel Management, along with other business leaders and investors who helped develop the institution during its formative years.

Under the leadership of Jack Tuason, the institution launched in June 2006 with accreditation from the Commission on Higher Education (CHED), operating from Wynsum Corporate Plaza in Ortigas Center and initially offering a Bachelor of Science in International Hospitality Management program.

In 2008, Enderun relocated to its permanent campus in McKinley Hill, Taguig. During its early years, the institution expanded its partnerships and academic offerings while developing its hospitality and business education programs.

In 2010, Enderun launched its Bachelor of Science in Entrepreneurship program, followed by its Bachelor of Science in Economics program in 2015.

In 2017, Udenna Corporation, led by businessman Dennis Uy, acquired Enderun Colleges as part of its diversification into the education sector.

The institution subsequently expanded its academic offerings to include senior high school education, architecture, interior design, and multimedia arts.

== Campus ==
The Enderun Colleges campus is located within the McKinley Hill development in Taguig City. The campus contains academic buildings, culinary laboratories, design studios, hospitality training facilities, event venues, and student support facilities.

== Academics ==
Enderun Colleges offers undergraduate degree programs through several academic divisions.

=== College of Business ===
- Bachelor of Science in Business Administration
  - Major in Marketing Management
  - Major in Financial Management
  - Major in Operations Management
  - Major in Technology Management
  - Major in Sustainability Management
- Bachelor of Science in Business Administration major in Operations Management with Specialization in Hospitality
- Bachelor of Science in Entrepreneurship
- Bachelor of Science in Economics

=== College of Hospitality Management ===
- Bachelor of Science in International Hospitality Management
  - Specialization in Culinary Arts

=== College of Architecture and Design ===
- Bachelor of Science in Architecture
- Bachelor of Science in Interior Design
- Bachelor of Multimedia Arts

=== Senior High School ===
- Accountancy, Business and Management (ABM)
- Science, Technology, Engineering and Mathematics (STEM)
- General Academic Strand (GAS)
- Humanities and Social Sciences (HUMSS)

The institution's academic model combines classroom instruction with experiential learning, industry immersion, and internship placements integrated into degree requirements.

== Academic partnerships and collaborations ==
Enderun Colleges maintains partnerships with educational institutions and industry organizations in the Philippines and abroad.

Notable academic collaborations include partnerships with École Ducasse, UCLA Extension, and the University of Hawaiʻi – West Oʻahu. These partnerships support student mobility, articulation agreements, professional certifications, and international learning opportunities.

Enderun's partnership with École Ducasse led to the establishment of the Ducasse Institute Philippines in 2012, described as the first Ducasse Institute outside France.

In 2022, Enderun entered into an academic collaboration with UCLA Extension, allowing students to take credit-bearing courses and earn certificates from UCLA Extension while enrolled at Enderun.

In 2023, Enderun established an articulation agreement with the University of Hawaiʻi – West Oʻahu, enabling students to complete portions of their undergraduate studies in both the Philippines and the United States.

== Internship program ==
Internships are a required component of the Enderun curriculum. Students complete professional internship placements as part of their degree requirements in both local and international organizations.

The institution maintains internship partnerships with more than 900 organizations across over 30 countries, providing opportunities in hospitality, culinary arts, business, finance, marketing, entrepreneurship, architecture, interior design, and multimedia arts.

Many students complete internships with international hospitality brands, multinational corporations, design firms, and entrepreneurial ventures in the Philippines and abroad.

== Student life ==
Students participate in academic organizations, leadership programs, athletics, and extracurricular activities.

Athletic teams compete under the name Enderun Titans and participate in the National Athletic Association of Schools, Colleges and Universities (NAASCU).

Student organizations support interests in business, entrepreneurship, hospitality, design, leadership, sustainability, and community engagement.

== See also ==
- Education in the Philippines
- List of universities and colleges in Metro Manila
- NAASCU
