= Philippine Football Federation =

Governing body of association football in the Philippines

AFC
- Founded: 1907; 119 years ago
- Headquarters: Pasig, Metro Manila
- FIFA affiliation: 1930
- AFC affiliation: 1954
- AFF affiliation: 1984
- President: John Gutierrez
- Vice-President: Lawrence Fortun (first); Jay Adriatico (second)
- General Secretary: Gelix Mercader
- Website: www.pff.org.ph

The Philippine Football Federation (PFF) is the governing body of association football in the Philippines. Established as the Philippine Amateur Football Association (PAFA) in 1907, the PFF is one of the oldest national football associations in Asia and is among the founding members of the Asian Football Confederation (AFC). The PAFA reorganized as the Philippine Football Association (PFA), and later as the Philippine Football Federation.

Aside from being a member of the AFC, the PFF is also a member of the ASEAN Football Federation. It is recognized as the national sports association (NSA) for the sport of football in the Philippines by Philippine Olympic Committee.

It organizes the Philippines men's, women's and youth national football teams (as well as national teams for the football variants of futsal and beach soccer). It is also responsible for the organization of domestic football tournaments in the Philippines such as the Philippines Football League and the Copa Paulino Alcantara through the Liga Futbol Inc., and the PFF Women's League.

== History ==
=== Early history ===
The football body's origins dates back to 1907 when it was established as the Philippine Amateur Football Association (PAFA). It was among the twelve founding Asian football associations of the Asian Football Confederation.

In 1917, the first Spanish and Filipino footballer to play for a European club, Paulino Alcántara Riestra, was selected by the Philippines to represent the country at the Far Eastern Championship Games in Tokyo. He helped them defeat Japan 15–2, which remains the largest win in Philippine international football history.

In 1961, stakeholders of Philippine football officially organized themselves to establish the Philippine Football Association (PFA) which was later reorganized as the Philippine Football Federation in 1982.

=== Adad era ===
In October 1996, Rene Adad was installed as PFF president after a snap election which ousted his predecessor, Ricardo Tan. In 2002, the PFF inaugurated its first regional center in Barotac Nuevo, Iloilo.

=== Martinez era ===
During Jose Mari Martinez's presidency the PFF experienced a number of organizational crises affecting both management and the national teams

Under Martinez, the PFF also had a new headquarters, the PFF House of Football in Pasig, which was inaugurated by then FIFA President Sepp Blatter and AFC President bin Hammam in 2008. The PFF moved to the building after occupying the PhilSports Complex as its headquarters for decades.

In 2009, a crisis affected the Philippine women's national futsal which resulted to the ouster of women's futsal coach Emmanuel Batungbacal and long-time men's national football coach Juan Cutillas. Batungbacal was dismissed amid allegations that he led the futsal team in a tournament without PFF sanction. Batungbacal denied the allegation and said he had sanction; some players subsequently resigned from international duty in protest. Martinez said that a lack of suitable coaching license was the reason to Batungbacal's dismissal.

On 27 November 2010, at the PFF 7th Ordinary Congress at the PhilSports Complex in Pasig, Martinez was ousted by 25 Presidents out of the 29 present member associations to approve a resolution made by 8 members of the Board of Governors calling for the ousting and replacement of Martinez as PFF president.Martinez was dismissed amid allegations that he falsified public documents and misused funds. Mariano Araneta was named Interim President.

=== Araneta era ===
After serving as Interim President for about a year after Martinez's ouster in 2010, Araneta was elected as president on 26 November 2011 at a PFF congress held at the Astoria Plaza in Pasig.

On 14 October 2016, at the Edsa Shangri-La Hotel in Pasig, the Online PFF Player Registration System was launched following a contract signing between the PFF, MMC Sportz Marketing and RSportz. The PFF described the initiative as an early example of its type in Southeast Asia. The registration system will create a database of Filipino players which will be accessible to organizers of PFF-sanctioned tournaments. The registration system was planned to be online by November 2016.

In November 2016, Araneta announced that the PFF will move its headquarters to Carmona, Cavite in 2017 where an artificial football pitch is due to be finished within the month. The new location will also house a dormitory, a natural grass pitch and corporate offices.

The PFF's registration system dubbed "My PFF" was officially launched in June 2017 and will be embedded in PFF's website on 3 July 2017 to be more accessible for registrants.

A financial dispute with the Philippine Sports Commission (PSC) was resolved on 14 September 2018, when the PFF remitted ₱4.8 million in unliquidated government assistance. The scope of the financial aid covers the administrations of the PFF from past 1996 to 2010.

The PFF was given the right to hold AFC 'A' and AFC 'B' Diploma Courses in the Philippines by the Asian Football Confederation starting 2019. The federation launched its first esports tournament, the PFF eTrophy which featured the video game title FIFA 21 in 2021.

On 30 July 2022, the groundbreaking ceremony for the new PFF headquarters in Carmona took place. In November 2022, the PFF decided to allow the expansion of its regional associations.

=== Gutierrez era ===
As Araneta reached the organisation's two-term limit, the PFF held an election on 25 November 2023 to select new officials.

John Gutierrez of Bukidnon FA was elected Araneta's successor. The other candidates were Filbert Alquiros of Stallion Laguna, and Henry Sabate of Davao-South RFA. Gutierrez garnered 30 out of 36 votes, with the other contenders receiving three votes each.

Under Gutierrez, national team performances in international competitions, grassroots and futsal development, modern infrastructure rollout, and stronger partnership with the Philippine Sports Commission (PSC) reached greater heights. Among the notable achievements were the historic first ever Southeast Asian Games gold medal by a Philippine football team, won by the Philippine women's national football team in December 2025; the Philippines' historic hosting of the 2025 FIFA Futsal Women's World Cup at the Philsports Arena; the rollout of twenty modern pitches of various sizes, starting with the launch of FIFA Arena in Balanga, Bataan; and PFF's partnership with PSC for the inaugural season of the PFF Futsaliga that began in February 2026.

The PFF held its first ever AFC Pro Diploma Coaching Course in July 2026.

== Presidents ==
List of presidents
Name	Term	
Name	Start	End
Manuel Tinio	?	
Ramon Farolan	?	
Felipe Monserrat	1962	1967
Luis Javellana	?	1969
Andres Soriano Jr.	1969	1981
Francisco Elizalde	1982	1986
Henri Kahn	1988	1989
Lope Pascual	?	1995
Honesto Isleta (acting)	1995	
Ricardo Tan	1995	1996
Rene Adad	1996	2004
Johnny Romualdez	2004	2008
Jose Mari Martinez	2008	2010
Mariano Araneta	2010	2023
John Gutierrez	2023	incumbent

== Association staff ==
Name	Position	Source
(Philippines) John Gutierrez	President	
(Philippines) Lawrence Fortun	First Vice President	
(Philippines) Jay Adriatico	Second Vice President	
(Philippines) Gelix Mercader	General Secretary	
(Philippines) Kevin Goco	Assistant General Secretary	
(Spain) Rafa Merino	Technical Director	
(Spain) Carles Cuadrat	Team Coach (Men's)	
(Australia) Mark Torcaso	Team Coach (Women's)	
(Philippines) Vincent Santos	Director of Football	
(Philippines) Merck Maguddayao	Media/Communications Manager	
(Philippines) Francis Piñon	Marketing Officer/Broadcast Chief	
(Japan) Tetsuya Tsuchida	Youth Development Head	
(Philippines) Michael Kevin Goco	Futsal Department Head	
(Philippines) Rey Ritaga	Referee Coordinator	
(Philippines) Ritchie Gannaban	Competitions Department Head	
(Philippines) Ariston Bocalan	Coaching Education Head	
(Philippines) Camille Rodriguez	Women's Football Development Head	
(Philippines) Venus Hermosura	Child safeguarding officer	

== Member associations ==
There are 36 member associations, three of which are professional football clubs, under the PFF.

- Agusan del Sur – Surigao del Sur RFA
- Cordillera RFA
- Bukidnon FA
- Butuan – Agusan Del Norte FA
- RFA of Camarines Norte
- Camiguin-Misamis Oriental FA
- Central Visayas RFA
- Golden Davao RFA
- North Davao RFA
- Davao R.F.A.
- Iligan – Lanao Regional Football Association (Iligan-Lanao RFA)
- Iloilo F.A.
- Laguna – Cavite RFA
- Legazpi City – Albay Federated RFA
- East Visayas R.F.A.
- Federated F.A. of Masbate
- Central Bicol RFA
- National Capital Region F.A.
- Negros Occidental F.A.
- Negros Oriental – Siquijor RFA
- Maguindanao-Cotabato City FA
- Misamis Occidental – Ozamis FA
- Mount Apo RFA
- Oriental Mindoro FA
- Quezon – Batangas RFA
- FA of Rizal
- South Cotabato – Sarangani – Gen. Santos City RFA (SOCSARGEN RFA)
- Sultan Kudarat RFA
- Surigao del Norte and Dinagat Islands RFA
- Central Luzon RFA
- Zamboanga del Norte – Dipolog RFA
- Pagadian – Zamboanga del Sur – Sibugay RFA
- Zamboanga – Basilan – Sulu – Tawi-tawi FA (ZAMBASULTA FA)
- Kaya F.C.–Iloilo
- Stallion Laguna F.C.
- United City F.C.

== PFF competitions ==
=== National league ===
- Philippines Football League
- PFF Women's League

=== National Cups ===
- Copa Paulino Alcantara
- PFF Women's Cup
- PFF National Men's Club Championship (defunct)

=== Youth competitions ===
- RFA Youth League
- PFF U19 National Boys' Championship
- PFF U16 National Boys' Championship
- PFF National U-22 Amateur Championship (inactive)
- PFF U-15 Boys National Championship (inactive)

=== Esports ===
- PFF eTrophy

=== Current title holders ===
Competition	Year	Champions	Title	Runners-up	Next edition
Men's
Senior
Philippines Football League	2025–26	Manila Digger	1st	One Taguig	2026–27
Copa Paulino Alcantara	2023	Kaya–Iloilo	3rd	Davao Aguilas	
Youth
PFF U16 National Boys' Championship	2026	National Capital Region F.A.	1st	Iloilo-Guimaras R.F.A.	
Women's
Senior
PFF Women's League	2026	Kaya–Iloilo	3rd	Far Eastern University	
PFF Women's Cup	2024	Stallion Laguna	1st	Kaya–Iloilo	

== National team coaches ==
Men's team	Name
National team	(Spain) Carles Cuadrat
Under-23 team	(Australia) Garrath McPherson
Under-19 team	(Spain) Dimas Delgado
Under-17 team	(Spain) Joan Segura
Futsal team	vacant

Women's team	Name
National team	(Australia) Mark Torcaso
Under-20 team	vacant
Under-17 team	vacant
Futsal team	(Spain) Rafa Merino Rodriguez

== Honors ==
The PFF was given the AFC President Recognition Award for Grassroots Football in the Developing Category in 2014 and in 2016.

== See also ==
- Philippines national futsal team
- Philippines women's national futsal team
- List of football clubs in the Philippines
- Philippine football clubs in Asian competitions
