= 2024 Pink Ladies Cup squads =

List of players competing at the 1st edition of the Pink Ladies Cup

This article lists the squads for the 2024 Pink Ladies Cup, the inaugural edition of the Pink Ladies Cup. The cup consisted of a series of friendly games, and was held in Turkey from 23 to 30 October 2024. The six national teams involved in the tournament registered a squad of 23 players.

The age listed for each player is on 23 October 2024, the first day of the tournament. The numbers of caps and goals listed for each player do not include any matches played after the start of tournament. The club listed is the club for which the player last played a competitive match prior to the tournament. The nationality for each club reflects the national association (not the league) to which the club is affiliated. A flag is included for coaches that are of a different nationality than their own national team.

== Squads ==
=== Chinese Taipei ===
Coach: Chen Xiaoming

The squad was announced on 15 October 2024.

No.	Pos.	Player	Date of birth (age)	Club
1	GK	Wang Yu-ting	27 May 2001 (aged 23)	(Chinese Taipei Football Association) Taipei Bravo
2	MF	Chang Chi-lan	18 September 1996 (aged 28)	(Chinese Taipei Football Association) Taichung Blue Whale
3	DF	Su Sin-yun	20 November 1996 (aged 27)	(Chinese Taipei Football Association) Taipei Bravo
4	DF	Yu Wen-chie	31 October 2000 (aged 23)	
5	DF	Pan Shin-yu	3 May 1997 (aged 27)	(Chinese Taipei Football Association) Taichung Blue Whale
6	DF	Teng Pei-lin	10 June 2002 (aged 22)	(Chinese Taipei Football Association) Hang Yuan
8	FW	Li Yi-wen	20 September 2005 (aged 19)	(Chinese Taipei Football Association) Hang Yuan
9	MF	Hsu Yi-yun	29 April 1997 (aged 27)	(Chinese Taipei Football Association) AC Taipei
11	FW	He Jia-shiua	7 May 2005 (aged 19)	(Chinese Taipei Football Association) Taiwan Mars
12	DF	Pu Hsin-hui	12 September 2005 (aged 19)	(Chinese Taipei Football Association) Taiwan Mars
13	MF	Chan Pi-han	27 April 1992 (aged 32)	(Chinese Taipei Football Association) Kaohsiung Sunny Bank
14	MF	Wu Kai-ching	14 November 1999 (aged 24)	(Chinese Taipei Football Association) Kaohsiung Sunny Bank
15	MF	Ding Jia Ying		
16		Chen Yu-yi		
17	FW	Chen Jin-wen	13 June 2003 (aged 21)	(Chinese Taipei Football Association) Taichung Blue Whale
18	GK	Liao Wen-Chi	8 August 1997 (aged 27)	(Chinese Taipei Football Association) Hang Yuan
19	FW	Su Yu-hsuan	21 February 2001 (aged 23)	(Chinese Taipei Football Association) Taichung Blue Whale
20	DF	Chen Ying-hui	5 October 1998 (aged 26)	(Chinese Taipei Football Association) Hang Yuan
21	FW	Lin Hsin-hui	6 February 2002 (aged 22)	(Chinese Taipei Football Association) Taipei Bravo
22	DF	Li Pei-jung	25 April 2000 (aged 24)	(Chinese Taipei Football Association) Taichung Blue Whale
23	MF	Lin Jing-xuan	11 May 2005 (aged 19)	(Chinese Taipei Football Association) Taichung Blue Whale
24	MF	Lin Ya-hsuan	31 December 2002 (aged 21)	(Chinese Taipei Football Association) Taichung Blue Whale
26	MF	Tseng Yun-ya		
28	DF	Huang Ke-sin	18 July 2003 (aged 21)	(Chinese Taipei Football Association) Taichung Blue Whale
29	FW	Yang Xiao-juan		
35	GK	Chiu I-hsiu	22 July 2005 (aged 19)	

=== Haiti ===
Coach: (France) Malou Quignette

The squad was announced on 30 September 2024.

No.	Pos.	Player	Date of birth (age)	Club
	GK	Kerly Théus	7 January 1999 (aged 25)	(United States Soccer Federation) Miami City
	GK	Nahomie Ambroise	13 November 2003 (aged 20)	(United States Soccer Federation) MDC Sharks
	GK	Kaïna Cesar	4 September 2005 (aged 19)	(United States Soccer Federation) Lipscomb Bisons
	DF	Deborah Bien-Aimé	16 September 2003 (aged 21)	(United States Soccer Federation) FIU Panthers
	DF	Claire Constant	19 October 1999 (aged 25)	(United States Soccer Federation) DC Power
	DF	Tabita Joseph	13 September 2003 (aged 21)	(French Football Federation) Marseille
	DF	Johane Laforte	24 February 1996 (aged 28)	(French Football Federation) RC Saint-Denis
	DF	Kethna Louis	5 August 1996 (aged 28)	(French Football Federation) Montpellier
	DF	Jasmine Vilgrain	25 July 2002 (aged 22)	(French Football Federation) Rodez
	DF	Betina Petit-Frère	1 August 2003 (aged 21)	(French Football Federation) Stade Brestois
	DF	Amandine Pierre-Louis	18 February 1995 (aged 29)	(French Football Federation) Saint-Étienne
	MF	Maudeline Moryl	24 January 2003 (aged 21)	(French Football Federation) Marseille
	MF	Dayana Pierre-Louis	24 September 2003 (aged 21)	(French Football Federation) Lens
	MF	Anyssa Ibrahim	8 February 1999 (aged 25)	(Portuguese Football Federation) Albergaria
	MF	Sherly Jeudy	13 October 1998 (aged 26)	(French Football Federation) Lens
	MF	Melchie Dumornay	17 August 2003 (aged 21)	(French Football Federation) Lyon
	FW	Chelsea Domond	19 December 1999 (aged 24)	(French Football Federation) Marseille
	FW	Batcheba Louis	15 June 1997 (aged 27)	(French Football Federation) Fleury
	FW	Roselord Borgella	1 April 1993 (aged 31)	(Turkish Football Federation) Fenerbahçe
	FW	Nérilia Mondésir	17 January 1999 (aged 25)	(United States Soccer Federation) Seattle Reign
	FW	Darlina Joseph	15 December 2003 (aged 20)	(French Football Federation) Marseille
	FW	Shwendesky Joseph	18 November 1997 (aged 26)	(Russian Football Union) Zenit Saint Petersburg
	FW	Lourdjina Étienne	14 July 2007 (aged 17)	(Haitian Football Federation) AS Tigresse

=== Jordan ===
Coach: Maher Abu Hantash

The squad was announced on 18 October 2024.

No.	Pos.	Player	Date of birth (age)	Club
	GK	Sherin Al-Shalabe	3 June 1994 (aged 30)	(Jordan Football Association) Shabab Al-Ordon
	GK	Malak Shank	1 August 1998 (aged 26)	(Saudi Arabian Football Federation) Ittihad
	GK	Rawand Kassab	6 November 2003 (aged 20)	(Saudi Arabian Football Federation) Al-Ahli
	GK	Sereen Ihraibi	22 June 2004 (aged 20)	(Jordan Football Association) Etihad
	DF	Ayah Al-Majali	9 March 1992 (aged 32)	(Saudi Arabian Football Federation) Al-Ahli
	DF	Rand Abu-Hussein	1 March 1997 (aged 27)	(Jordan Football Association) Amman FC
	DF	Nour Zoqash	1 September 1999 (aged 25)	(Jordan Football Association) Shabab Al-Ordon
		Alanoud Ghazi	18 May 1999 (aged 25)	(Jordan Football Association) Etihad
	DF	Alia Hassan	17 October 2004 (aged 20)	(Jordan Football Association) Al-Nasser
	DF	Rania Jamhour	8 June 2005 (aged 19)	(United States Soccer Federation) St. Thomas Bobcats
	DF	Lana Feras	1 June 1998 (aged 26)	(Saudi Arabian Football Federation) Al-Shabab
	DF	Taqi Ghazi	29 July 2005 (aged 19)	(Jordan Football Association) Etihad
	DF	Rouzbahan Fraij	7 April 2000 (aged 24)	(Jordan Football Association) Etihad
	MF	Zaina Hazem	8 July 2004 (aged 20)	(Jordan Football Association) Etihad
	MF	Enas Al-Jamaeen	11 November 2003 (aged 20)	(Jordan Football Association) Etihad
	MF	Yasmine Al-Ajrab	1 February 2005 (aged 19)	(Jordan Football Association) Istiqlal
	MF	Celine Akroush	15 October 2003 (aged 21)	(United States Soccer Federation) Redlands Bulldogs
	MF	Lina Al-Saheb	1 March 1997 (aged 27)	(Jordan Football Association) Etihad
	FW	Maysaa Jabara	20 September 1989 (aged 35)	(Saudi Arabian Football Federation) NEOM
	FW	Bana Al-Bitar	6 October 1996 (aged 28)	(Jordan Football Association) Amman FC
	FW	Farah Abu Tayeh	13 June 1998 (aged 26)	(United States Soccer Federation) Georgia Impact
	FW	Rital Al-Shoubaki		(Jordan Football Association) Istiqlal
	FW	Leen Al-Btoush	20 July 2001 (aged 23)	(Jordan Football Association) Etihad
	FW	Nada Ghadhban		(Canadian Soccer Association) Algonquin Wolves
	FW	Roukayah Al Fararjeh	20 June 2005 (aged 19)	(Football Australia) Blacktown Spartans

=== Kenya ===
Coach: Beldine Odemba

The squad was announced on 21 October 2024.

No.	Pos.	Player	Date of birth (age)	Club
	GK	Annette Kundu	17 December 1996 (aged 27)	(Football Kenya Federation) Kenya Police Bullets
	GK	Judith Osimbo	8 August 1999 (aged 25)	(Football Kenya Federation) Ulinzi Starlets
	DF	Fanis Kwamboka		(Football Kenya Federation) Kibera
	DF	Mollyne Akinyi		(Football Kenya Federation) Acakoro Football Academy
	DF	Vivian Nasaka	19 December 1999 (aged 24)	(Turkish Football Federation) Hakkarigücü
	DF	Ruth Ingosi	19 December 1993 (aged 30)	(Tanzania Football Federation) Simba Queens
	DF	Lavender Akinyi		(Football Kenya Federation) Ulinzi Starlets
	DF	Wincate Kaari	13 November 1999 (aged 24)	(Tanzania Football Federation) Simba Queens
	DF	Norah Ann	15 September 2002 (aged 22)	(Football Kenya Federation) Kenya Police Bullets
	MF	Providence Khasiala		(Football Kenya Federation) Vihiga Queens
	MF	Lydia Akoth	22 September 1994 (aged 30)	(Football Kenya Federation) Kenya Police Bullets
	MF	Lorna Nyarinda	13 October 2000 (aged 24)	(Football Kenya Federation) Kenya Police Bullets
	MF	Fasila Adhiambo		(Football Kenya Federation) Ulinzi Startles
	MF	Robby Maxmilla		(Football Kenya Federation) Kibera
	FW	Elizabeth Mutukiza	17 July 1998 (aged 26)	(Tanzania Football Federation) Simba Queens
	FW	Anna Arusi		(Football Kenya Federation) Kibera
	FW	Elizabeth Mideva		(Football Kenya Federation) Archbishop Njenga
	FW	Rebecca Okwaro		(Football Kenya Federation) Kenya Police Bullets
	FW	Lucy Kwekwe		(Football Kenya Federation) Kenya Police Bullets
	FW	Purity Alukwe		(Football Kenya Federation) Kenya Police Bullets
	FW	Achieng Beverline		(Football Kenya Federation) Zetech Sparks

=== Philippines ===
Coach: (Australia) Mark Torcaso

The squad was announced on 12 October 2024.

No.	Pos.	Player	Date of birth (age)	Club
	GK	Olivia McDaniel	14 October 1997 (aged 27)	(Philippine Football Federation) Stallion Laguna
	GK	Nina Meollo	23 June 2004 (aged 20)	(The Football Association) Ipswich Town
	GK	Inna Palacios	8 February 1994 (aged 30)	(Philippine Football Federation) Kaya–Iloilo
	DF	Angela Beard	16 August 1997 (aged 27)	(Swedish Football Association) Linköping
	DF	Rhea Chan	4 September 2000 (aged 24)	(Philippine Football Federation) Manila Digger
	DF	Jessika Cowart	30 October 1999 (aged 24)	Unattached
	DF	Janae DeFazio	6 September 2001 (aged 23)	(Portuguese Football Federation) Racing Power
	DF	Sofia Harrison	16 February 1999 (aged 25)	(Philippine Football Federation) Stallion Laguna
	DF	Hali Long	21 January 1995 (aged 29)	(Philippine Football Federation) Kaya–Iloilo
	DF	Ariana Markey	8 June 2007 (aged 17)	(United States Soccer Federation) Slammers
	DF	Maz Pacheco	25 August 1998 (aged 26)	(The Football Association) Aston Villa
	DF	Lauren Villasin	27 June 2007 (aged 17)	(United States Soccer Federation) Cedar Stars Rush
	MF	Anicka Castañeda	15 December 1999 (aged 24)	(United States Soccer Federation) DLSU Lady Booters
	MF	Judy Connolly	26 July 2003 (aged 21)	(Philippine Football Federation) Manila Digger
	MF	Sara Eggesvik	29 April 1997 (aged 27)	(Football Australia) Western United
	MF	Kaya Hawkinson	17 April 2000 (aged 24)	(Lithuanian Football Federation) Gintra
	MF	Isabella Pasion	28 November 2006 (aged 17)	(Philippine Football Federation) Stallion Laguna
	MF	Quinley Quezada	7 April 1997 (aged 27)	(Philippine Football Federation) Manila Digger
	MF	Jaclyn Sawicki	14 November 1992 (aged 31)	Unattached
	MF	Meryll Serrano	20 July 1997 (aged 27)	(Norwegian Football Federation) Stabæk
	FW	Sarina Bolden	30 June 1996 (aged 28)	(Italian Football Federation) Como
	FW	Alessandrea Carpio	4 March 2002 (aged 22)	(United States Soccer Federation) Oakland Soul
	FW	Isabella Flanigan	22 February 2005 (aged 19)	(Royal Spanish Football Federation) Europa
	FW	Katrina Guillou	19 December 1993 (aged 30)	(United States Soccer Federation) DC Power
	FW	Nina Mathelus	12 September 2008 (aged 16)	(United States Soccer Federation) Scorpions
	FW	Chandler McDaniel	4 February 1998 (aged 26)	(Philippine Football Federation) Stallion Laguna

=== Russia ===
Coach: Yuri Krasnozhan

The squad was announced on 21 October 2024.

No.	Pos.	Player	Date of birth (age)	Club
	GK	Tatyana Shcherbak	22 October 1997 (aged 27)	(Russian Football Union) Lokomotiv Moscow
	GK	Violetta Isaykina	23 April 2004 (aged 20)	(Russian Football Union) Chertanovo Moscow
	GK	Natalia Silina	2 August 1999 (aged 25)	(Russian Football Union) Krasnodar
	DF	Alsu Abdullina	11 April 2001 (aged 23)	(Russian Football Union) Lokomotiv Moscow
	DF	Veronika Kuropatkina	3 September 1999 (aged 25)	(Russian Football Union) Zenit Saint Petersburg
	DF	Ksenia Dzhinikashvili	4 August 1997 (aged 27)	(Russian Football Union) Chertanovo Moscow
	DF	Yulia Pleshkova	15 January 2002 (aged 22)	(Russian Football Union) CSKA Moscow
	DF	Natalia Morozova	14 October 1995 (aged 29)	(Russian Football Union) Spartak Moscow
	DF	Valentina Smirnova	25 October 2002 (aged 21)	(Russian Football Union) Krasnodar
	MF	Viktoria Kozlova	21 December 1995 (aged 28)	(Russian Football Union) Lokomotiv Moscow
	MF	Ksenia Dolgova	14 November 2004 (aged 19)	(Russian Football Union) Lokomotiv Moscow
	MF	Polina Yuklyaeva	7 November 2003 (aged 20)	(Russian Football Union) Lokomotiv Moscow
	MF	Azalia Zalmieva	11 August 2006 (aged 18)	(Russian Football Union) Lokomotiv Moscow
	MF	Elizaveta Semenova	18 June 2004 (aged 20)	(Russian Football Union) Zenit Saint Petersburg
	MF	Darina Ishmukhametova	3 November 2005 (aged 18)	(Russian Football Union) Zenit Saint Petersburg
	MF	Alina Shkalova	21 March 2005 (aged 19)	(Russian Football Union) Chertanovo Moscow
	MF	Tatiana Petrova	23 December 2001 (aged 22)	(Russian Football Union) CSKA Moscow
	MF	Daiana Kishmakhova	16 October 2003 (aged 21)	(Russian Football Union) CSKA Moscow
	MF	Marina Fedorova	10 May 1997 (aged 27)	(Russian Football Union) Spartak Moscow
	MF	Medea Zharkova	12 July 2003 (aged 21)	(Russian Football Union) Krasnodar
	MF	Kristina Komissarova	24 February 2001 (aged 23)	(Russian Football Union) Dynamo Moscow
	FW	Natalia Mashina	28 March 1997 (aged 27)	(Russian Football Union) Spartak Moscow
	FW	Elena Shesterneva	18 December 1999 (aged 24)	(Russian Football Union) Dynamo Moscow
	FW	Valeria Bizenkova	4 January 1997 (aged 27)	(Russian Football Union) Lokomotiv Moscow

== Player representation ==
=== By club ===
Clubs with four or more players represented are listed.

Players	Club
8	(Chinese Taipei) Taichung Blue Whale, (Jordan) Etihad
7	Kenya Police Bullets, (Russia) Lokomotiv Moscow
4	(Chinese Taipei) Hang Yuan, (France) Marseille, (Philippines) Stallion Laguna, (Russia) Zenit Saint Petersburg

=== By club nationality ===
Players	Clubs
25	Russia
20	Chinese Taipei
17	Kenya
15	Jordan, United States
13	France
9	Philippines
5	Saudi Arabia
3	Tanzania
2	Australia, England, Portugal, Turkey
1	Canada, Haiti, Italy, Lithuania, Norway, Spain, Sweden

=== By club federation ===
Players	Federation
51	AFC
49	UEFA
20	CAF
17	CONCACAF

=== By representatives of domestic league ===
National squad	Players
Russia	24
Chinese Taipei	20
Kenya	17
Jordan	15
Philippines	9
Haiti	1
