= List of Philippines international footballers born outside the Philippines =

This is a list of foreign-born football players who played for the Philippines national football team. Players born in countries other than the Philippines including those born in diaspora may qualify for the Philippines team through Filipino parents or grandparents, or through naturalization as Philippine citizens.

The Philippines is noted for including Filipinos of foreign-descent in their national football teams. Most of these players are born abroad. They have naturalized only one player without any Filipino ancestry so far – Bienvenido Marañón

This list excludes players with non-Filipino heritage such as Filipino-Japanese Daisuke Sato (Davao-born), Filipino-Iranian Misagh Bahadoran (Pampanga-born) and Simone Rota (adopted by Italian parents). This only includes players that have made at least one international cap for the Philippine national team.

== List of players ==
=== Men ===
==== List ====
Player	Place of birth	First cap (Note: For the senior Philippine national team only)	Last cap	Filipino ancestry (Note: Guide: Maternal – ancestry through Filipino mother Paternal – ancestry through Filipino father Full – ancestry through both Filipino parents)	Ref
Leigh Gunn	Australia (Sydney)	1999	2011	Maternal	
Aly Borromeo	United States (San Francisco)	2004	2011	Maternal	
Anton del Rosario	United States (San Francisco)	2004	2014	Full (Note: Conflicting information. Del Rosario describes himself to be of full Filipino ancestry though he also noted that his mother is a Spaniard based in Quezon City.)	
Chris Greatwich	England (Westminster)	2004	2014	Maternal	
James Younghusband	England (Ashford, Surrey)	2006	2019	Maternal	
Phil Younghusband	England (Ashford, Surrey)	2006	2019	Maternal	
Phil Greatwich	England (Brighton)	2006	2008	Maternal	
Neil Etheridge	England (London)	2008	present	Maternal	
Simon Greatwich	England (Brighton)	2008	2016	Maternal	
Jason de Jong	Netherlands (Breda)	2008	2016	Maternal	
Rob Gier	England (Ascot)	2009	2015	Maternal	
Gino Pavone	United States (San Francisco)	2010	2010	Maternal	
Manuel Ott	Germany (Munich)	2010	present	Maternal	
Jerry Lucena	Denmark (Aarhus)	2011	2015	Paternal	
Ángel Guirado	Spain (Málaga)	2011	2021	Maternal	
Paul Mulders	Netherlands (Amsterdam)	2011	2018	Maternal	
Nate Burkey	United States (Washington, D.C.)	2011	2014	Maternal	
Roland Müller	Germany (Cologne)	2011	2017	Maternal	
Mark Hartmann	England (Southampton)	2011	2023	Maternal	
Matthew Hartmann	England (Southampton)	2011	2011	Maternal	
Carli de Murga	Spain (El Puerto de Santa Maria)	2011	2023	Maternal	
Jeffrey Christiaens	Belgium (Brussels)	2011	2018	Maternal	
Dennis Cagara	Denmark (Glostrup)	2011	2014	Paternal	
Oliver Pötschke	Germany (Berlin)	2011	2011	Maternal	
Lexton Moy	United States (New York)	2011	2013	Maternal	
Stephan Schröck	Germany (Schweinfurt)	2011	2024	Maternal	
Denis Wolf	Germany (Hanover)	2012	2012	Maternal	
Marwin Angeles	Italy (Venice)	2012	2018	Full	
Marvin Angeles	Italy (Venice)	2012	2012	Full	
Juan Luis Guirado	Spain (Málaga)	2012	2016	Maternal	
Patrick Reichelt	Germany (East Berlin)	2012	2024	Maternal	
Matthew Uy	United States (New Hyde Park)	2012	2012	Paternal	
OJ Porteria	United States (Richmond)	2012	present	Full	
Demitrius Omphroy	United States (Alameda)	2012	2012	Maternal	
Javier Patiño	Spain (San Sebastián de los Reyes)	2013	2019	Maternal	
Martin Steuble	Switzerland (Schlieren)	2014	2021	Maternal	
Kenshiro Daniels	United States (Columbus, Ohio)	2014	present	Maternal	
Charley Pettys	United States (Irvine, California)	2014	2014	Maternal	
Nick O'Donnell	Canada (Toronto)	2014	2018	Maternal	
Curt Dizon	England (London)	2014	2019	Full	
Álvaro Silva	Spain (Andujar)	2014	2019	Paternal	
Satoshi Otomo	Japan (Sakae, Chiba)	2014	2014	Maternal	
Tomas Trigo	Spain (Pamplona)	2014	2014	Maternal	
Iain Ramsay	Australia (Perth)	2015	2022	Maternal	
Dennis Villanueva	Italy (Rome)	2015	present	Paternal	
Luke Woodland	United Arab Emirates (Abu Dhabi)	2015	2021	Maternal	
Kevin Ingreso	Germany (Hamburg)	2015	present	Paternal	
Stephan Palla	Austria (Mauerbach)	2015	2019	Maternal	
Hikaru Minegishi	Japan (Sendai, Miyagi)	2016	2023	Maternal	
Mike Ott	Germany (Munich)	2016	present	Maternal	
Dominic del Rosario	Australia (Sydney)	2016	2016	Maternal	
Miguel Tanton	United States (Santa Clara, California)	2016	2019		
Junior Muñoz	Netherlands (Haarlem)	2016	2018		
Dylan De Bruycker	Belgium (Ghent)	2017	present	Maternal	
Adam Reed	England (Hartlepool)	2017	2019		
James Hall	Scotland (Glasgow)	2017	2017	Maternal	
Michael Falkesgaard	Denmark (Kastrup)	2018	2019	Maternal	
John-Patrick Strauß	Germany (Wetzlar)	2018	present	Maternal	
Amin Nazari	Sweden (Malmö)	2018	2021	Maternal	
Christian Rontini	Italy (Bagno a Ripoli)	2019	present	Maternal	
Oliver Bias	Germany (Johanngeorgenstadt)	2021	2023	Maternal	
Kevin Ray Mendoza	Denmark (Herning)	2021	present	Maternal	
Michael Kempter	Switzerland (Schlieren)	2021	present	Maternal	
Oskari Kekkonen	Finland (Kotka)	2021	present	Maternal	
Jefferson Tabinas	Japan (Shinjuku, Tokyo)	2021	present	Maternal	
Bernd Schipmann	Germany (Münster)	2021	2021	Maternal	
Bienvenido Marañón	Spain (El Puerto de Santa María)	2021	present	None (Naturalized)	
Jesper Nyholm	Sweden (Uppsala)	2021	present	Maternal	
Mark Winhoffer	United States (New York)	2021	present	Maternal	
Kike Linares	Spain (Cádiz)	2022	present	Paternal	
Diego Bardanca	Spain (León, Spain)	2022	present		
Gerrit Holtmann	Germany (Bremen)	2022	present	Maternal	
Simen Lyngbø	Norway (Bærum)	2022	present	Maternal	
Jesse Curran	Australia (Tasmania)	2022	present	Maternal	
Sebastian Rasmussen	Denmark (Aarhus)	2022	present	Maternal	
Harry Föll	Germany (Offenburg)	2022	present	Maternal	
Anthony Pinthus	Switzerland (Solothurn)	2022	present	Maternal	
Julian Schwarzer	England (Harrogate)	2022	present	Maternal	
Paul Tabinas	Japan (Shinjuku, Tokyo)	2022	present	Maternal	
Santiago Rublico	Spain (Madrid)	2023	present	Full	
John Lucero	England (Brighton)	2023	present	Full	
Griffin McDaniel	United States (Orange County)	2023	present	Maternal	
Dennis Chung	Germany (Berlin)	2023	present	Maternal	
Gavin Muens	United States (Corpus Christi)	2023	present	Maternal	
Michael Baldisimo	Canada (Vancouver)	2024	present	Full	
Zico Bailey	United States (Henderson)	2024	present	Maternal	
Dylan Demuynck	Belgium (Waregem)	2024	present	Maternal	
Adrian Ugelvik	Norway (Molde)	2024	present	Maternal	
Scott Woods	Norway (Oslo)	2024	present	Maternal	
Matthew Baldisimo	Canada (Vancouver)	2024	present	Full	
Joshua Grommen	Australia (Brisbane)	2024	2024	Maternal	
Javier Mariona	United States (Los Altos)	2024	present	Maternal	
Quincy Kammeraad	Netherlands (Haarlem)	2024	present	Maternal	
Randy Schneider	Switzerland (Schaffhausen)	2025	present	Maternal	
Josef Baccay	Norway (Oslo)	2025	present	Paternal	
André Leipold	Germany (Altötting)	2025	present	Maternal	

==== By country of birth ====
Birthplace	Players (Note: Only takes into account players listed above)
United States	18
Germany	15
England	11
Spain	10
Denmark	5
Australia	5
Italy	4
Japan	4
Netherlands	4
Norway	4
Switzerland	4
Belgium	3
Canada	3
Sweden	2
Austria	1
Finland	1
Scotland	1
United Arab Emirates	1

=== Women ===
==== List ====
Player	Place of birth	First cap (Note: For the senior Philippine national team only)	Last cap	Filipino ancestry	Ref
Maya Alcantara	United States (Rancho Cucamonga, California)	2022	present	—N/a	
Tahnai Annis	United States (Zanesville, Ohio)	2018	present	Maternal	
Angela Beard	Australia (Meadowbrook, Queensland)	2023	present	Maternal	
Sarina Bolden	United States (Santa Clara, California)	2018	present	Maternal	
Reina Bonta	United States (New Haven, Connecticut)	2022	present	Paternal	
Rhea Chan	United States	2024	present	—N/a	
Jessika Cowart	United States (Fairfield, California)	2022	present	Maternal	
Janae DeFazio	United States (Folsom, California)	2024	present	Maternal	
Sara Eggesvik	Norway (Bodø)	2022	present	Maternal	
Kiara Fontanilla	United States (Fullerton, California)	2022	present	Paternal	
Carleigh Frilles	United States (Fairfax, Virginia)	2022	present	Paternal	
Cathrine Graversen	Denmark (Holbæk)	2019	present	—N/a	
Katrina Guillou	United States (Washington D.C.)	2022	present	Maternal	
Sofia Harrison	United States (Montgomery County, Maryland)	2018	present	—N/a	
Kaya Hawkinson	United States (Torrance, California)	2022	present	—N/a	
Hali Long	United States (Cape Girardeau, Missouri)	2016	present	Maternal	
Chandler McDaniel	United States (Orange, California)	2021	present	Maternal	
Olivia McDaniel	United States (Laguna Beach, California)	2021	present	Maternal	
Nina Meollo	England	2025	present	Full	
Katana Norman	United States (Glendale, California)	2024	present	Maternal	
Natalie Oca	United States (Los Alamitos, California)	2023	present	—N/a	
Alexa Pino	United States (Norwalk, Connecticut)	2024	present	Paternal	
Quinley Quezada	United States (Rosemead, California)	2018	present	Maternal	
Camille Sahirul	United States	2024	present	—N/a	
Jaclyn Sawicki	Canada (Coquitlam, British Columbia)	2022	present	Maternal	
Jesse Shugg	Canada (Burlington, Ontario)	2013	2018	Maternal	
Chayse Ying	United States (Orange County, California)	2025	present	—N/a	

==== By country of birth ====
Birthplace	Players
United States	21
Canada	2
Australia	1
Denmark	1
England	1
Norway	1

== See also ==
- ASEAN international footballers born from countries other than their respective football nationalities
  - List of Indonesia international footballers born outside Indonesia
  - List of Malaysia international footballers born outside Malaysia
  - List of Singapore international footballers born outside Singapore
  - List of Thailand international footballers born outside Thailand
  - List of Vietnam international footballers born outside Vietnam
