= 2025 in Philippine football =

Football in Philippines
- Season: 2025

Men's football
- Philippines Football League: Kaya–Iloilo
- Philippines Football League Finals Series: Dynamic Herb Cebu

Women's football
- PFF Women's League: Kaya–Iloilo

The following article is a summary of the 2025 football season in the Philippines.

== National teams ==
=== Men's senior ===
==== AFC Asian Cup qualification ====
| March 25 3rd round | Philippines | 4–1 | Maldives | Capas, Philippines |
| 19:00 UTC+8 | J. Tabinas 6'; Kristensen 19'; Schneider 77'; Reyes 90+2' | | Fasir 62' | Stadium: New Clark City Athletics Stadium; Attendance: ~4,800; Referee: Daniel Elder (Australia) |

| June 10 3rd round | Philippines | 2–2 | Tajikistan | Capas, Philippines |
| 19:00 UTC+8 | Kristensen 28', 79' | Report (AFC) | Mabatshoyev 30'; Umarbayev 42' (pen.) | Stadium: New Clark City Athletics Stadium; Attendance: 10,854; Referee: Hasan Akrami (Iran) |

| October 9 3rd round | Timor-Leste | 1–4 | Philippines | Darwin, Australia |
| 19:00 UTC+9:30 | Freitas 47' | Report (AFC) | Kristensen 15', 31', 49', 56' | Stadium: Territory Rugby League Stadium; Attendance: 1,356; Referee: Yudi Nurcahya (Indonesia) |

| October 14 3rd round | Philippines | 3–1 | Timor-Leste | Capas, Philippines |
| 19:00 UTC+8 | J. Tabinas 46'; Kristensen 70'; Gayoso 90+1' | Report; Report (AFC) | Rangel 45+1' | Stadium: New Clark City Athletics Stadium; Attendance: 10,034; Referee: Torphong Somsing (Thailand) |

| November 18 3rd round | Maldives | v | Philippines | Malé, Maldives |
| 15:30 UTC+5:30 | | | | Stadium: National Football Stadium |

=== Men's under-23 ===
==== AFC U-23 Asian Cup qualification ====
| September 3 | Syria | 2–1 | Philippines | Dushanbe, Tajikistan |
| 18:00 UTC+5 | Al Aswad 61'; Al Mustafa 80' | | Reyes 78' | Stadium: Pamir Stadium; Attendance: 44; Referee: Saeed Rashid Al-Marzooqi (United Arab Emirates) |

| September 6 | Philippines | 1–0 | Tajikistan | Dushanbe, Tajikistan |
| 21:00 UTC+5 | Leddel 71' | | | Stadium: Pamir Stadium; Attendance: 5,740; Referee: Harish Kundu (India) |

| September 9 | Philippines | 4–0 | Nepal | Dushanbe, Tajikistan |
| 18:00 UTC+5 | Banatao 32'; Mariona 39' (pen.); Cariño 81'; Reyes 85' | | | Stadium: Pamir Stadium; Referee: Ahmad A'Qashah (Singapore) |

==== ASEAN U-23 Championship ====
===== Group A =====
| Pos | Team | Pld | W | D | L | GF | GA | GD | Pts | Qualification |
|---|---|---|---|---|---|---|---|---|---|---|
| 1 | Indonesia (H) | 3 | 2 | 1 | 0 | 9 | 0 | +9 | 7 | Advance to knockout stage |
| 2 | Philippines | 3 | 2 | 0 | 1 | 4 | 1 | +3 | 6 | Advance to knockout stage |
| 3 | Malaysia | 3 | 1 | 1 | 1 | 7 | 3 | +4 | 4 | |
| 4 | Brunei | 3 | 0 | 0 | 3 | 1 | 17 | −16 | 0 | |

Source: ASEAN United FC
Rules for classification: Group stage tiebreakers
(H) Hosts

| July 15 | Malaysia | 0–2 | Philippines | Central Jakarta, Indonesia |
| 17:00 UTC+7 | | | Banatao 9', 40' | Stadium: Gelora Bung Karno Stadium; Referee: Takasaki Koji (Japan) |

| July 18 | Philippines | 0–1 | Indonesia | Central Jakarta, Indonesia |
| 20:00 UTC+7 | | | Rosquillo 23' (o.g.) | Stadium: Gelora Bung Karno Stadium; Referee: Mohammed Al Ismail (Saudi Arabia) |

| July 21 | Philippines | 2–0 | Brunei | Bekasi, Indonesia |
| 20:00 UTC+7 | Mariona 20' (pen.); Nuñez 85' | | | Stadium: Patriot Stadium; Referee: Pansa Chaisanit (Thailand) |

| July 25 SF | Vietnam | 2–1 | Philippines | Central Jakarta, Indonesia |
| 16:00 UTC+7 | Nguyễn Đình Bắc 41'; Nguyễn Xuân Bắc 54' | | Mariona 35' | Stadium: Gelora Bung Karno Stadium; Referee: Usaid Jamal (Malaysia) |

=== Men's under-17 ===
==== Friendlies ====
| July 9 Lion City Cup | Singapore | 0–2 | Philippines | Kallang, Sigapore |
| 20:00 UTC+8 | | | Moleje 64'; Binalong 69' | Stadium: Jalan Besar Stadium |

| July 11 Lion City Cup | Philippines | 1–1 | Hong Kong | Kallang, Sigapore |
| 17:00 UTC+8 | | | | Stadium: Jalan Besar Stadium |

| July 13 Lion City Cup | Cambodia | 1–3 | Philippines | Kallang, Sigapore |
| 17:00 UTC+8 | | | | Stadium: Jalan Besar Stadium |

=== Women's senior ===
==== Friendlies ====
| April 4 | United Arab Emirates | 1–4 | Philippines | Dubai, United Arab Emirates |
| 19:30 UTC+4 | Juma 89' | Report | Long 8'; C. McDaniel 19', 33'; Serrano 31' | Stadium: Theyab Awana Stadium |

| April 8 | United Arab Emirates | 0–4 | Philippines | Dubai, United Arab Emirates |
| 19:30 UTC+4 | | Report | Eggesvik 37'; Frilles 54'; Long 62'; C. McDaniel 74' | Stadium: Theyab Awana Stadium |

| May 30 Unofficial friendly | Philippines | 0–1 | Chinese Taipei | Manila, Philippines |
| 19:00 UTC+8 | | Report | | Stadium: Rizal Memorial Stadium; Attendance: 0 (closed doors) |

| June 3 | Philippines | 0–1 | Chinese Taipei | Manila, Philippines |
| 19:00 UTC+8 | | Report | Matsunaga 27' | Stadium: Rizal Memorial Stadium; Attendance: 3,312; Referee: Nurul Ain Izatty Binti Zainal (Malaysia) |

| October 29 | Philippines | 2–2 | Uzbekistan | Manila, Philippines |
| 19:00 UTC+8 | C. McDaniel 2'; Serrano 57' | Report | Khabibullaeva 67', 81' | Stadium: Rizal Memorial Stadium; Attendance: 3,106 |

==== AFC Women's Asian Cup qualification ====
===== Group G =====
- All matches will be held in Cambodia.
- Times listed are UTC+7.

| Pos | Team | Pld | W | D | L | GF | GA | GD | Pts | Qualification |
|---|---|---|---|---|---|---|---|---|---|---|
| 1 | Philippines | 3 | 3 | 0 | 0 | 10 | 0 | +10 | 9 | Final tournament |
| 2 | Hong Kong | 3 | 1 | 1 | 1 | 2 | 2 | 0 | 4 | |
| 3 | Cambodia (H) | 3 | 1 | 1 | 1 | 3 | 8 | −5 | 4 | |
| 4 | Saudi Arabia | 3 | 0 | 0 | 3 | 1 | 6 | −5 | 0 | |

Updated to match(es) played on 5 July 2025. Source: AFC
Rules for classification: Tiebreakers
(H) Hosts

| June 29 | Philippines | 3–0 | Saudi Arabia | Phnom Penh, Cambodia |
| 16:00 UTC+7 | Sawicki 16'; Serrano 55'; Pino 81' | Report | | Stadium: Olympic Stadium; Referee: Sunita Thongthawin (Thailand) |

| July 2 | Cambodia | 0–6 | Philippines | Phnom Penh, Cambodia |
| 19:00 UTC+7 | | Report | Pino 18'; Serrano 19', 36'; Nimol 40' (o.g.); Long 48'; C. McDaniel 56' | Stadium: National Olympic Stadium; Referee: Oh Hyeon-Jeong (South Korea) |

| July 5 | Philippines | 1–0 | Hong Kong | Phnom Penh, Cambodia |
| 19:00 UTC+7 | C. Mcdaniel 4' | Report | | Stadium: National Olympic Stadium; Referee: Le Thi Yi (Vietnam) |

==== ASEAN Women's Championship ====
| August 7 GS | Philippines | 7–0 | Timor-Leste | Phú Thọ, Vietnam |
| 19:30 UTC+7 | Schinaman 2'; Quezada 7', 32'; Long 9'; Tolentin 57', 64'; Wyrzynski 75' | Report | | Stadium: Việt Trì Stadium; Referee: Songkran Bunmeekiart (Thailand) |

| August 10 GS | Australia U23 | 1–0 | Philippines | Phú Thọ, Vietnam |
| 19:30 UTC+7 | Jancevski 45+1' | Report | | Stadium: Việt Trì Stadium |

| August 13 GS | Philippines | 1–1 | Myanmar | Haiphong, Vietnam |
| 19:30 UTC+7 | Mathelus 71' | Report | Win Theingi Tun 33' (pen.) | Stadium: Lạch Tray Stadium |

==== SEA Games ====
===== Group B =====
| Pos | Team | Pld | W | D | L | GF | GA | GD | Pts | Qualification |
|---|---|---|---|---|---|---|---|---|---|---|
| 1 | Vietnam | 3 | 2 | 0 | 1 | 9 | 1 | +8 | 6 | Advance to knockout stage |
| 2 | Philippines | 3 | 2 | 0 | 1 | 8 | 2 | +6 | 6 | Advance to knockout stage |
| 3 | Myanmar | 3 | 2 | 0 | 1 | 5 | 3 | +2 | 6 | |
| 4 | Malaysia | 3 | 0 | 0 | 3 | 0 | 16 | −16 | 0 | |

Source: Soccerway

| December 5 Group B | Myanmar | 2–1 | Philippines | Chonburi, Thailand |
| 16:00 UTC+7 | Win Theingi Tun 4'; May Htet Lu 89' | | Ramirez 69' | Stadium: IPE Chonburi Stadium |

| December 8 Group B | Philippines | 1–0 | Vietnam | Chonburi, Thailand |
| 18:30 UTC+7 | Ramirez 90+4' | Report | | Stadium: Chonburi Stadium; Referee: Gulshoda Saidqulova (Uzbekistan) |

| December 11 Group B | Philippines | 6–0 | Malaysia | Chonburi, Thailand |
| 16:00 UTC+7 | Pino 45', 53', 70' (pen.); Cowart 68'; Markey 85'; Castañeda 9+6' | | | Stadium: IPE Chonburi Stadium; Referee: Sunita Thongthawin (Thailand) |

| December 14 SF | Thailand | v | Philippines | Chonburi, Thailand |
| 18:30 UTC+7 | | | | Stadium: Chonburi Stadium |

=== Women's under-20 ===
The Philippine Football Federation (PFF) decided not to participate in the 2025 ASEAN U-19 Women's Championship and the 2026 AFC U-20 Women's Asian Cup qualification. The decision was met with widespread criticism. The move was described as “wasting the dreams, sacrifices, and efforts" of the youth team, and that “the opportunity to build a better pool for the senior team is lost.”

=== Women's under-17 ===
==== AFC U-17 Women's Asian Cup qualification ====
| October 13 | Philippines | 5–0 | Syria | Dushanbe, Tajikistan |
| 14:00 UTC+5 | Enderes 4', 44'; Mizzo 50'; Evangelista 52'; Muros 72' | Report | | Stadium: Pamir Stadium |

| October 15 | Tajikistan | 0–2 | Philippines | Dushanbe, Tajikistan |
| 17:00 UTC+5 | | Report | Evangelista 11'; Dagpin 90+5' | Stadium: Pamir Stadium |

| October 17 | Philippines | 4–0 | Malaysia | Dushanbe, Tajikistan |
| 14:00 UTC+5 | Rivera 6'; C. Mizzo 23'; Sia 59'; Dania 68' (o.g.) | Report | | Stadium: Pamir Stadium |

=== Women's futsal ===
The Filipinas futsal team qualified in the AFC Women's Futsal Asian Cup for the first time on January 17, 2025, after finishing as the best third-placed team in the qualifiers in Tashkent, Uzbekistan

==== AFC Women's Futsal Asian Cup qualification ====
===== Group C =====
| Pos | Team | Pld | W | D | L | GF | GA | GD | Pts | Qualification |
|---|---|---|---|---|---|---|---|---|---|---|
| 1 | Australia | 4 | 4 | 0 | 0 | 16 | 3 | +13 | 12 | Final tournament |
| 2 | Uzbekistan (H) | 4 | 2 | 1 | 1 | 15 | 8 | +7 | 7 | Final tournament |
| 3 | Philippines | 4 | 2 | 1 | 1 | 10 | 6 | +4 | 7 | Final tournament |
| 4 | Turkmenistan | 4 | 1 | 0 | 3 | 7 | 17 | −10 | 3 | |
| 5 | Kuwait | 4 | 0 | 0 | 4 | 4 | 18 | −14 | 0 | |

Source: AFC
Rules for classification: Qualification tiebreakers
(H) Hosts

| January 11 | Kuwait | 1–4 | Philippines | Tashkent, Uzbekistan |
| 18:00 UTC+5 | Sh. Mohammad 36' | Report | Guillou 4', 39'; Flanigan 22'; Tolentin 27' | Stadium: Yunusobod Sport Complex; Referee: Najat Al-Blooshi (United Arab Emirates) |

| January 13 | Philippines | 3–3 | Uzbekistan | Tashkent, Uzbekistan |
| 15:00 UTC+5 | Flanigan 4'; Guillou 15'; Connolly 39' | Report | Kudratova 8'; Karachik 23', 38' | Stadium: Yunusobod Sport Complex |

| January 15 | Turkmenistan | 0–2 | Philippines | Tashkent, Uzbekistan |
| 15:00 UTC+5 | | Report | Guillou 23'; Tolentin 30' | Stadium: Yunusobod Sport Complex |

| January 19 | Philippines | 1–2 | Australia | Tashkent, Uzbekistan |
| 15:00 UTC+5 | Smit 20' (o.g.) | Report | Arrowsmith 7'; Au 21' | Stadium: Yunusobod Sport Complex |

==== AFC Women's Futsal Asian Cup ====
| May 7 GS | Iran | 1–0 | Philippines | Hohhot, China |
| 11:00 UTC+8 | Torkaman 38" | Report | | Stadium: Hohhot Sports Centre; Attendance: 117; Referee: Liang Qingyun (China); Zhu Xin (China) |

| May 9 GS | Philippines | 0–3 | Vietnam | Hohhot, China |
| 11:00 UTC+8 | | | Trịnh Nguyễn Thanh Hằng 22"; Trần Thị Thu Xuân 33"; Lê Thị Thanh Ngân 40" (2pen.) | Stadium: Hohhot Sports Centre; Attendance: 280; Referee: Nour Chaito (Lebanon); Panadda Khotsenaphattra (Thailand) |

| May 11 GS | Hong Kong | 7–3 | Philippines | Hohhot, China |
| 11:00 UTC+8 | | | | Stadium: Hohhot Sports Centre; Referee: Mari Yamamoto (Japan); Nurul Atikah Janah (Malaysia) |

==== Friendlies ====
| September 26 Friendly | Japan | 5–1 | Philippines | Chiba, Japan |
| | Kazui 5'; Ikeuchi 11'; Ito 18'; Matsuki 5', 35' | Report | 9' | Stadium: Prince Takamado Memorial JFA YUME Field Futsal Arena |

| September 28 Friendly | Japan | 11–2 | Philippines | Chiba, Japan |
| | | Report | | Stadium: Prince Takamado Memorial JFA YUME Field Futsal Arena |

| November 8 Friendly | Spain | 7–1 | Philippines | Las Rozas de Madrid, Spain |
| | Graversen 5' (og) | Report | Tolentin 18' | Stadium: La Ciudad del Fútbol; Referee: Ignacio del Olmo |

==== FIFA Women's Futsal World Cup ====
| November 21 2025 FIFA Futsal Women's World Cup | Philippines | 0–6 | Poland | Pasig, Philippines |
| 20:30 UTC+8 | | Report | Basta 6'19", 23'55"; Matuszewska 18'18"; Szostak 22'18"; Ortillo 25'50", o.g.; Dymińska 29'53" | Stadium: PhilSports Arena; Attendance: 2,211; Referee: Anelize Schulz (Brazil) |

| November 24 2025 FIFA Futsal Women's World Cup | Philippines | 2–3 | Morocco | Pasig, Philippines |
| 20:30 UTC+8 | Tolentin 3'53"; Graversen 7'1" | Report | Laftah 9'47"; Tadlaoui 13'55"; Demraoui 16'56" | Stadium: PhilSports Arena; Attendance: 1,771; Referee: Alice Vevodova (Czech Republic) |

| November 27 2025 FIFA Futsal Women's World Cup | Argentina | 5–1 | Philippines | Pasig, Philippines |
| 20:30 UTC+8 | Villalba 1'35"; Romero 3'15"; Natta 3'57"; Chiesa 6'07"; Quevedo 6'56" | Report | Bandoja 27'24" | Stadium: PhilSports Arena; Attendance: 2,811; Referee: Krystin Pahia (United States) |

== AFC competitions ==
=== ASEAN Club Championship ===
| January 9 GS | Kaya–Iloilo (Philippines) | 1–2 | (Vietnam) Cong An Hanoi | Manila, Philippines (Note: Kaya–Iloilo played their first home match at Rizal Memorial Stadium, Manila, instead of their designated home stadium Iloilo Sports Complex, Iloilo City. They played their last match at the Biñan Football Stadium in Biñan due to Rizal Stadium's renovation.) |
| 19:00 UTC+8 | Swainston 54' | Report | Lê Văn Đô 16'; Casambre 28' (o.g.) | Stadium: Rizal Memorial Stadium; Referee: Chae Sang-hyeop (South Korea) |

| January 23 GS | Borneo (Indonesia) | 2–1 | (Philippines) Kaya–Iloilo | Gianyar, Indonesia |
| 20:00 UTC+8 | Peralta 28'; Dwiky 90+1' | Report | Melliza 82' | Stadium: Kapten I Wayan Dipta Stadium; Referee: Firdavs Nosafarov (Uzbekistan) |

| February 6 GS | Kaya–Iloilo (Philippines) | 2–0 | (Singapore) Lion City Sailors | Biñan, Philippines |
| 20:30 UTC+8 | del Rosario 66'; Melliza 71' (pen.) | Report | | Stadium: Biñan Football Stadium; Referee: Firdavs Nosafarov (Uzbekistan) |

== Leagues ==
=== Philippines Football League ===
Kaya–Iloilo won their 3rd PFL title after a 2–0 victory against Stallion Laguna on April 13, 2025.

| Pos | Team | Pld | W | D | L | GF | GA | GD | Pts | Qualification |
|---|---|---|---|---|---|---|---|---|---|---|
| 1 | Kaya–Iloilo (C) | 18 | 14 | 2 | 2 | 48 | 15 | +33 | 44 | Qualification for the 2025–26 AFC Champions League Two Group stage |
| 2 | Manila Digger | 18 | 14 | 1 | 3 | 56 | 10 | +46 | 43 | Qualification for the 2025–26 AFC Champions League Two Qualifying play-offs |
| 3 | One Taguig | 18 | 10 | 3 | 5 | 39 | 13 | +26 | 33 | |
| 4 | Dynamic Herb Cebu | 18 | 9 | 4 | 5 | 33 | 18 | +15 | 31 | Qualification for the 2025–26 ASEAN Club Championship Qualifying play-offs (Note: Qualified for 2025–26 ASEAN Club Championship Qualifying play-offs as the 2024–25 Philippines Football League Finals Series winners.) |
| 5 | Stallion Laguna | 18 | 8 | 3 | 7 | 36 | 25 | +11 | 27 | |
| 6 | Davao Aguilas | 18 | 7 | 4 | 7 | 24 | 16 | +8 | 25 | |
| 7 | Maharlika Taguig | 18 | 5 | 3 | 10 | 21 | 37 | −16 | 18 | |
| 8 | Loyola | 18 | 5 | 2 | 11 | 20 | 39 | −19 | 17 | |
| 9 | Philippine YNT | 18 | 3 | 4 | 11 | 16 | 49 | −33 | 13 | |
| 10 | Mendiola 1991 | 18 | 1 | 2 | 15 | 14 | 85 | −71 | 5 | |

Source: Matchday+
(C) Champions

=== PFF Women's League ===
| Pos | Team | Pld | W | D | L | GF | GA | GD | Pts |
|---|---|---|---|---|---|---|---|---|---|
| 1 | Kaya–Iloilo (C) | 10 | 7 | 2 | 1 | 41 | 6 | +35 | 23 |
| 2 | Stallion Laguna | 10 | 7 | 2 | 1 | 22 | 3 | +19 | 23 |
| 3 | Capital1 Solar Strikers | 10 | 6 | 1 | 3 | 32 | 10 | +22 | 19 |
| 4 | Makati | 10 | 5 | 1 | 4 | 28 | 10 | +18 | 16 |
| 5 | University of Santo Tomas | 10 | 1 | 0 | 9 | 7 | 50 | −43 | 3 |
| 6 | University of the Philippines | 10 | 1 | 0 | 9 | 2 | 53 | −51 | 3 |

Source: Kaya FC
Rules for classification: 1) Points; 2) Goal Difference; 3) Goals scored
(C) Champions

== Deaths ==
- July 7, 2025: Juan Cutillas, 83, Philippines head coach.

== See also ==
- Football in Philippines
