= Miriam Merlin =

Filipino footballer (born 1975 or 1976)

Personal information
- Full name: Miriam V. Merlin
- Date of birth: 1975 or 1976 (age 49–50)

International career
Years	Team	Apps	(Gls)
1980s	Philippines		
2005–2007	Philippines (futsal)		

Managerial career
- 1999–: De La Salle Lipa (girls)
Medal record
Women's futsal
Representing Philippines
Bronze medal – third place	2007 Bangkok	Team

Miriam "Yami" V. Merlin (born 1975 or 1976) is a Filipino former footballer who represented the Philippines in both football and futsal. She later became a long-time coach and educator.

== Career ==
Merlin was part of the Philippine national football team in the 1980s, coached by Orlando Plagata, alongside teammates like Buda Bautista and Let Dimzon. She was scouted at the 1993 Philippine National Games in Baguio at the age of 17.

She also played for the national futsal team under coach Manny Batungbacal and competed at the 2005 Asian Indoor Games and the 2007 Southeast Asian Games, where they earned a bronze medal.

== Later life ==
Merlin has been a long-time educator and coach. She has taught Grade 9 MAPEH education for 27 years and has coached the De La Salle Lipa girls' football/futsal team for over two decades.

== Career statistics ==
International

Philippine women's national futsal team goals
No.	Date	Venue	Opponent	Score	Result	Competition	Ref.
1.	November 13, 2005	Thai-Japanese Youth Center Hall 2, Bangkok, Thailand	Thailand	1–5	1–8	2005 Asian Indoor Games	
2.	November 14, 2005	Thai-Japanese Youth Center Hall 2, Bangkok, Thailand	Uzbekistan	1–0	2–6	2005 Asian Indoor Games	
