= 2025 PFF Women's League =

PFF Women's League
- Season: 2025
- Dates: March 22 – June 21, 2025
- Champions: Kaya–Iloilo
- AFC Champions League: Kaya–Iloilo
- Matches: 30
- Goals: 132 (4.4 per match)
- Best player: Hali Long
- Top goalscorer: Julissa Cisneros (13 goals)
- Highest scoring: Capital1 Solar Strikers 12–1 University of Santo Tomas (May 31, 2025)
- Longest winning run: 5 matches Kaya–Iloilo; Capital1 Solar Strikers
- Longest unbeaten run: 7 matches Stallion Laguna
- Longest winless run: 8 matches University of Santo Tomas
- Longest losing run: 8 matches University of Santo Tomas

The 2025 PFF Women's League was the fifth season of the women's national league of the Philippines following the 2023 season.

Kaya–Iloilo, the defending champions, retained the league title. The Stallion Laguna meanwhile entered the season as the 2024 PFF Women's Cup winners.

== Format ==
The league followed a double round-robin format, which began on March 22, 2025. The primary venue for the league's matches was the SM Mall of Asia Football Pitch in Pasay, Metro Manila.

In July 2024, there were plans to have two divisions were disclosed. But as of the official launch, no second division has been announced.

Mico Gutierrez is the league commissioner and Grid Sports Athletic has been tasked with the conduct of the league.

== Clubs ==
Six teams are participating in the 2025 season with the Capital1 Solar Strikers and Makati making their debuts. This is four less teams than the previous seasons.

| Team | Head coach | Captain | Kit manufacturer | Shirt partners |
|---|---|---|---|---|
| Capital1 Solar Strikers | (Philippines) Let Dimzon | (Philippines) Hazel Lustan | Blaze Athletics | SpeedRegalo |
| Kaya–Iloilo | (Philippines) David Basa | (Philippines) Hali Long | LGR | LBC |
| Makati | (Philippines) Dan Padernal | (Ghana) Ayishatu Simpson | In-house | Qingdao Hailiya |
| Stallion Laguna | (United States) Clint McDaniel | (Philippines) Chandler McDaniel | Blaze Athletics | Giligan's Restaurant, PAGSS, SCID |
| University of Santo Tomas | (Philippines) Marjo Allado | (Philippines) Bianca Sy | In-house | Studio 300 |
| University of the Philippines | (Philippines) Anto Gonzales | (Philippines) Jeri Facturanan | Steeze | SMC |

== Coaching changes ==
| Team | Outgoing coach | Incoming coach | Date of appointment |
|---|---|---|---|
| Capital1 Solar Strikers | None | (Philippines) Let Dimzon | February 2025 (Pre-season) |
| Makati | (Philippines) Jayson Cutamora | (Philippines) Dan Padernal | April 2025 |

== Foreign players ==
| Club | Players | | | | | | | | |
|---|---|---|---|---|---|---|---|---|---|
| Capital1 Solar Strikers | (Ghana) Helina Lamptey | (United States) Arianna Del Moral | (United States) Emma Young | | | | | | |
| Kaya–Iloilo | (Mexico) Julissa Cisneros | (United States) Julia Humphreys | (Spain) Judit Peran Pericas | | | | | | |
| Makati | (Ghana) Selina Anima | (Ghana) Veronica Appiah | (Indonesia) Sheva Furyzcha | (Thailand) Kawinthida Kikuntod | (Indonesia) Nafeeza Nori | (Indonesia) Nasywa Rambe | (Ghana) Ayishatu Simpson | (Indonesia) Shalika Viandrisa | (Indonesia) Gea Yumanda |
| Stallion Laguna | (United States) Haley Bostard | (United States) Sierra Castles | (United States) Nia Fountain | (United States) Megan Janikowski | (United States) Kala McDaniel | (Guam) Jenna Merrill | (United States) Kaelyn Miller | (United States) Madison Samilo | (United States) Mikayla Simons |
| University of Santo Tomas | None in roster | | | | | | | | |
| University of the Philippines | None in roster | | | | | | | | |

== Venue ==
The league matches will be played at the MOA Football Pitch at the SM Mall of Asia in Pasay.

Pasay
| MOA Football Pitch | MOA Football Pitch (Metro Manila) |
| Capacity: 1,800 | MOA Football Pitch (Metro Manila) |

== League table ==
| Pos | Team | Pld | W | D | L | GF | GA | GD | Pts |
|---|---|---|---|---|---|---|---|---|---|
| 1 | Kaya–Iloilo (C) | 10 | 7 | 2 | 1 | 41 | 6 | +35 | 23 |
| 2 | Stallion Laguna | 10 | 7 | 2 | 1 | 22 | 3 | +19 | 23 |
| 3 | Capital1 Solar Strikers | 10 | 6 | 1 | 3 | 32 | 10 | +22 | 19 |
| 4 | Makati | 10 | 5 | 1 | 4 | 28 | 10 | +18 | 16 |
| 5 | University of Santo Tomas | 10 | 1 | 0 | 9 | 7 | 50 | −43 | 3 |
| 6 | University of the Philippines | 10 | 1 | 0 | 9 | 2 | 53 | −51 | 3 |

Source: Kaya FC
Rules for classification: 1) Points; 2) Goal Difference; 3) Goals scored
(C) Champions

== Positions by round ==
| Team ╲ Round | 1 | 2 | 3 | 4 | 5 | 6 | 7 | 8 | 9 | 10 |
|---|---|---|---|---|---|---|---|---|---|---|
| Kaya–Iloilo | 1 | 1 | 1 | 1 | 1 | 2 | 2 | 1 | 1 | 1 |
| Stallion Laguna | 3 | 3 | 2 | 2 | 2 | 1 | 1 | 2 | 2 | 2 |
| Capital1 Solar Strikers | 5 | 4 | 4 | 4 | 3 | 3 | 3 | 3 | 3 | 3 |
| Makati | 2 | 2 | 3 | 3 | 4 | 4 | 4 | 4 | 4 | 4 |
| University of Santo Tomas | 6 | 6 | 6 | 6 | 6 | 6 | 6 | 6 | 5 | 5 |
| University of the Philippines | 4 | 5 | 5 | 5 | 5 | 5 | 5 | 5 | 6 | 6 |

| Qualification for AFC Women's Champions League |

Source: PFFWL

== Results by round ==
| Team ╲ Round | 1 | 2 | 3 | 4 | 5 | 6 | 7 | 8 | 9 | 10 |
|---|---|---|---|---|---|---|---|---|---|---|
| Capital1 Solar Strikers | L | W | L | W | W | W | W | W | D | L |
| Kaya–Iloilo | W | W | W | W | W | L | W | D | D | W |
| Makati | W | W | D | L | L | W | W | L | W | L |
| Stallion Laguna | W | W | W | D | W | W | W | L | W | D |
| University of Santo Tomas | L | L | L | L | L | L | L | L | W | L |
| University of the Philippines | L | L | L | W | L | L | L | L | L | L |

Source: PFFWL
W = Win; D = Draw; L = Loss

== Results ==
| Club/Team | CSS | KAY | MFC | STA | UST | UPD |
|---|---|---|---|---|---|---|
| Capital1 Solar Strikers | | 0–3 | 3–1 | 1–0 | 3–1 | 6–0 |
| Kaya–Iloilo | 1–1 | | 2–1 | 1–1 | 8–0 | 11–0 |
| Makati | 2–1 | 1–2 | | 0–0 | 5–1 | 5–0 |
| Stallion Laguna | 1–0 | 2–1 | 1–0 | | 3–0 | 6–0 |
| University of Santo Tomas | 1–2 | 0–7 | 0–4 | 0–6 | | 1–2 |
| University of the Philippines | 0–5 | 0–5 | 0–9 | 0–2 | 0–3 | |

Source: PFFWL
Legend: Blue = left column team win; Yellow = draw; Red = top row team win.

== Season statistics ==
=== Top scorers ===
| Rank | Player | Club | Goals |
|---|---|---|---|
| 1 | (Mexico) Julissa Cisneros | Kaya–Iloilo | 13 |
| 2 | (Philippines) Judie Arevalo | Capital1 Solar Striker | 10 |
| 3 | (Philippines) Rhiauna de la Calzada | Makati | 8 |
| 3 | (Philippines) Chandler McDaniel | Stallion Laguna | 8 |
| 4 | (Indonesia) Sheva Furyzcha | Makati | 6 |
| 4 | (Philippines) Dionesa Tolentin | Kaya–Iloilo | 6 |
| 7 | (United States) Sierra Castles | Stallion Laguna | 5 |
| 7 | (Philippines) Angelica Teves | Capital1 Solar Striker | 5 |
| 9 | (United States) Julia Humphreys | Kaya–Iloilo | 4 |
| 9 | (United States) Kala McDaniel | Stallion Laguna | 4 |
| 9 | (Philippines) Regine Rebosura | Capital1 Solar Striker | 4 |

=== Hat-tricks ===
| Player | For | Against | Result | Date | Ref. |
|---|---|---|---|---|---|
| (Mexico) Julissa Cisneros | Kaya–Iloilo | University of Santo Tomas | 8–0 | March 22, 2025 | |
| (Mexico) Julissa Cisneros | Kaya–Iloilo | University of the Philippines | 11–0 | April 27, 2025 | |
| (Mexico) Julissa Cisneros | Kaya–Iloilo | University of Santo Tomas | 7–0 | May 3, 2025 | |
| (Mexico) Julissa Cisneros | Kaya–Iloilo | University of the Philippines | 5–0 | May 31, 2025 | |
| (Philippines) Rhiauna de la Calzada | Makati | University of Santo Tomas | 5–1 | May 14, 2025 | |
| (Philippines) Rhiauna de la Calzada^{4} | Makati | University of the Philippines | 9–0 | May 17, 2025 | |
| (Philippines) Judie Rose Arevalo^{5} | Capital1 Solar Striker | University of Santo Tomas | 12–1 | May 31, 2025 | |
| (Philippines) Regine Rebosura | Capital1 Solar Striker | University of Santo Tomas | 12–1 | May 31, 2025 | |
| (Philippines) Angelica Teves | Capital1 Solar Striker | University of Santo Tomas | 12–1 | May 31, 2025 | |

^{4} – Player scored four goals.
^{5} – Player scored five goals.

=== Clean sheets ===
| Rank | Player | Club | Clean sheets |
|---|---|---|---|
| 1 | (Philippines) Olivia McDaniel | Stallion Laguna | 7 |
| 2 | (Ghana) Ayishatu Simpson | Makati | 4 |
| 3 | (Philippines) Inna Palacios | Kaya–Iloilo | 3 |
| 4 | (Philippines) Kiara Fontanilla | Kaya–Iloilo | 2 |
| 4 | (Philippines) Yasmin May Elauria | Capital1 Solar Striker | 2 |
| 6 | (Philippines) Jessa Lehayan | Capital1 Solar Striker | 1 |
| 6 | (Philippines) Lizlie Garcia | University of Santo Tomas | 1 |

== Awards ==
The following awards were given at the conclusion of the tournament.

| Award | Winner | Club |
|---|---|---|
| Most Valuable Player | (Philippines) Hali Long | Kaya–Iloilo |
| Golden Boot | (Mexico) Julissa Cisneros | Kaya–Iloilo |
