= Rhea Chan =

Filipino footballer (born 2000)

Personal information
- Full name: Rhea Janae Arcenal Chan
- Date of birth: September 24, 2000 (age 26)
- Place of birth: United States
- Height: 5 ft 5 in (1.65 m)
- Position: Defender

Team information
- Current team: Kaya Iloilo
- Number: 12

Youth career
- 2016–2019: San Jose Earthquakes Academy
- Sacred Heart Cathedral Preparatory

College career
Years	Team	Apps	(Gls)
2019–2020	Pacific Tigers	7	(0)
2021–2023	Cal Poly Humboldt Lumberjacks	49	(0)

Senior career*
Years	Team	Apps	(Gls)
2024–2025	Manila Digger		
2025–	Stallion Laguna	10	(0)

International career^{‡}
2024–	Philippines	3	(0)
2025–	Philippines (futsal)		
- * Club domestic league appearances and goals as of June 14, 2025 ‡ National team caps and goals as of April 8, 2024

Rhea Janae Arcenal Chan (born September 24, 2000) is a professional footballer who plays as a defender for PFF Women's League club Kaya–Iloilo. Born in the United States, she represents the Philippines at international level in football and futsal.

== Club career ==
In July 2024, Chan signed with Manila Digger for the 2024 PFF Women's Cup, alongside fellow Philippines international Kiara Fontanilla.

In 2025, she transferred to Stallion Laguna and made 10 appearances during the 2025 PFF Women's League season.

== International career ==
On February 15, 2024, Chan received her first call-up to the Philippines national football team for the 2024 Pinatar Cup in Spain. She made her international debut on April 5, 2024, in a friendly against South Korea.
