= C1SS =

C1SS may refer to:

- Capital1 Solar Spikers, women's volleyball team in the Philippines
- Capital1 Solar Strikers, women's football club in the Philippines
