= Buda Bautista =

Philippine association football player

Personal information
- Full name: Leticia Callejas Bautista
- Date of birth: 15 August 1973 (age 53)
- Place of birth: San Juan, Rizal, Philippines
- Position: Defender

International career
Years	Team	Apps	(Gls)
1980s–2000s	Philippines		

Managerial career
- 2012: Philippines U19 (women's)
- 2015–2017: Philippines (women's)
- 2018: Philippines (women's)

Leticia Callejas Bautista, more commonly known as Buda Bautista was a former Philippine international footballer and was the head coach of the Philippine women's national football team.

== Playing career ==
Bautista along with Miriam Merlin and Let Dimzon played with the Philippine women's national football team of the 1980s coached by Orlando Plagata. Bautista was part of the national squad that participated at the 2003 FIFA Women's World Cup qualifiers

== Coaching career ==
=== Philippines U-19 ===
Bautista was named as head coach of the Philippines U19 (women's) for the 2013 AFC U-19 Women's Championship qualification.

=== Philippines ===
Bautista was appointed as the head coach of the Philippine women's national football team in April 2015 becoming the first woman to lead the women's senior national team of the Philippines.

Bautista mentored the national squad which secured qualification for the 2018 AFC Women's Asian Cup. She was succeeded by Marnelli Dimzon who took over her position by July 2017.

She was shortlisted for the 2017 AFC Women's Coach Of The Year Award along with Gao Hong of China and Asako Takakura of Japan.

Bautista returns as the head coach of the Philippine women's national team by June 2018 and guided the team in the 2018 AFF Women's Championship. Like in her first national team stint, she was again succeeded by Marnelli Dimzon in August 2018.

== Statistics ==
=== Managerial ===
As of 16 May 2017.

Nat	Team	from	to	Record				
Nat	Team	from	to	Games	Wins	Draws	Losses	Win %
(Philippines)	Philippines	April 2015	2017	11	5	1	5	45.45
Total				11	5	1	5	45.45
