= Jordan O'Brien =

American soccer player

Personal information
- Full name: Jordan Montgomery O'Brien
- Date of birth: October 11, 1992 (age 34)
- Place of birth: Anaheim, California, United States
- Height: 5 ft 7 in (1.70 m)
- Position: Central midfielder

Youth career
- 2006–2010: Marina High School

College career
Years	Team	Apps	(Gls)
2010–2013	Tulsa Golden Hurricane	79	(8)

Senior career*
Years	Team	Apps	(Gls)
2015	Houston Dash	0	(0)
2016	QBIK	6	(0)
2016	KR	8	(3)
2017	Orlando Pride	0	(0)
2018	Avaldsnes IL	2	(1)
2019–2023	River Plate		
2024	Stallion Laguna	12	(1)
2025	Stockton Cargo	5	(0)
- * Club domestic league appearances and goals as of May 12, 2025

Jordan Montgomery O'Brien (born October 11, 1992) is an American soccer player.

== Early life ==
O'Brien was born to Patrick and Jean O'Brien and raised in Garden Grove, California. Her brother, Kyle, is also a professional soccer player, playing for California United Strikers FC in the NISA. Her dad played soccer as well.

O'Brien, who graduated from Marina High School in 2010, was a four-year letterwinner soccer player at the school. She was a two-time Sunset League MVP (2008, 2010).

As a youth, Watt also played club soccer for the Slammers FC. With the team, she won fourteen state and national titles.

== College career ==
O'Brien attended University of Tulsa from 2010 to 2013 and played for the Tulsa Golden Hurricane women's soccer team under head coach Kyle Cussen. She played four years for the Tulsa Golden Hurricane, finishing her university career with 8 goals and 19 assists in 79 games played. During her career at Tulsa, she was named to the NSCAA/Performance Subaru All-Central Region third team (2010), All-Conference USA First Team (2010), All-Conference USA Third Team (2011, 2012), All-Conference USA Second Team (2013) as well as being awarded the 2010 Conference USA Freshman of the Year. In 2015, O'Brien graduated from Tulsa with a degree in psychology.

== Club career ==
=== Houston Dash, 2015 ===
O'Brien signed for Houston Dash in 2015. She left at the end of the season and did not make an appearance.

=== QBIK, 2016 ===
On February 25, 2016, O'Brien signed for QBIK. After having troubles with her visa and being injured, O'Brien was released in June 2016.

=== KR, 2016 ===
On 6 September 2016, O'Brien scored a brace for KR against Fylkir in the Úrvalsdeild. She also scored a goal in a win against ÍA on 30 September, a win that saved KR from relegation.

=== Orlando Pride, 2017 ===
On June 16, 2017, the Orlando Pride announced their signing of O'Brien after initially joining the Pride as a training player mid-way through the 2016 NWSL season.

Following the 2017 season, Pride placed O'Brien on the Re-Entry Wire. She was not claimed by another team.

=== Avaldsnes, 2018 ===
O'Brien signed with Avaldsnes IL on July 13, 2018. On 10 August, she scored on her debut against ŽFK Dragon 2014 in the 2018–19 UEFA Women's Champions League qualifying round.

On 4 November, she made her Toppserien debut against Stabæk

=== River Plate, 2019–2023 ===
On October 13, 2019, River Plate signed O'Brien. She made her debut in a 4–0 victory against Porvenir. On February 9, 2020, she scored her debut goal in the 5–0 win over Estudiantes.

=== The Soccer Tournament, 2024–2025 ===
In June 2024, O'Brien played in The Soccer Tournament 2024 as a member of the Tampa Bay Sun, scoring 3 goals in 4 games. O'Brien returned to TST in 2025 as a member of the Drunken Monkeys.
