= 2022 PFF Women's Cup =

Tournament details
- Country: Philippines
- Dates: November 5 – December 17, 2022
- Teams: 8

Final positions
- Champions: Far Eastern University (3rd title)
- Runners-up: University of the Philippines
- Third place: Kaya–Iloilo
- Fourth place: Tuloy

Tournament statistics
- Matches played: 32
- Goals scored: 156 (4.88 per match)
- Top goal scorer(s): Shelah Mae Cadag (15 goals)

Awards
- Best player: Dionesa Tolentin

The 2022 PFF Women's Cup was the 3rd edition of the cup competition. This edition marked the return of competitive women's football in the Philippines, with the PFF Women's League last held in 2019–20. No women's tournament had been held since 2020 due to the COVID-19 pandemic. This also marked the return on the women's cup itself which was last held in 2015.

The women's cup ran from November 5 to December 17, 2022. The Far Eastern University successfully defended their title by winning 2–0 over the University of the Philippines in the final.

== Participating teams ==
There were eight participating teams, including four university teams and two guest clubs.

Philippine Football Federation member clubs 2 teams	University Athletic Association of the Philippines; 4 collegiate teams of the UAAP	Guests; 2 clubs
Kaya–Iloilo; Stallion Laguna	Ateneo de Manila; Far Eastern University; University of the Philippines; University of Santo Tomas	Tuloy; Azzurri

=== Personnel and kits ===
Team	Head coach	Captain	Kit manufacturer	Shirt partners
Ateneo de Manila	(Philippines) Jeoffrey Lobaton	(Philippines) Patricia Francisco	(United States) Nike	
Azzurri	(Philippines) Solomon Valerio	(Philippines) Princess Cristobas		Azzurri Sports Clinic
Far Eastern University	(Philippines) Let Dimzon	(Philippines) Dionesa Tolentin		
Kaya–Iloilo	(Philippines) Marigen Ariel	(Philippines) Hali Long	(Philippines) LGR	LBC, ICanServe, Fitogether
Tuloy	(Philippines) Henry Saul	(Philippines) Jamielyn Nanez		Tuloy Foundation
Stallion Laguna	(Philippines) Jose Tamayo	(Philippines) Sabrina Nierras	(Philippines) Cutz Apparel	Giligan's Restaurant
University of the Philippines	(Philippines) Anto Gonzales	(Philippines) Alyssa Ube	(Philippines) Blaze	SMC Infrastructure, Victory Liner
University of Santo Tomas	(Philippines) Geraldine Cabrera	(Philippines) Jerelyn Danao	(Philippines) Blaze	

== Results ==
=== Preliminary round ===
Pos	Team	Pld	W	D	L	GF	GA	GD	Pts	Qualification	KAY	TLY	FEU	UPD	UST	ADM	AZR	STA
1	Kaya–Iloilo	7	6	0	1	34	4	+30	18	Semifinals	—	3–1	0–2	—	—	7–0	—	—
2	Tuloy	7	5	1	1	21	7	+14	16	Semifinals	—	—	1–0	—	2–1	3–2	—	—
3	Far Eastern University	7	5	0	2	23	2	+21	15	Semifinals	—	—	—	2–0	0–1	—	8–0	6–0
4	University of the Philippines	7	4	1	2	18	4	+14	13	Semifinals	0–1	0–0	—	—	4–0	—	—	—
5	University of Santo Tomas	7	3	1	3	16	13	+3	10		0–3	—	—	—	—	2–1	3–3	9–0
6	Ateneo de Manila	7	2	0	5	10	21	−11	6		—	—	0–5	1–2	—	—	2–1	4–1
7	Azzurri	7	0	2	5	8	35	−27	2		1–5	1–7	—	0–8	—	—	—	2–2
8	Stallion Laguna	7	0	1	6	3	47	−44	1		0–15	0–7	—	0–4	—	—	—	—

Source: PFF

November 5, 2022	Azzurri	0–8	University of the Philippines	PFF National Training Center, Carmona
16:00		Report	Ube 17', 31'; Mangrobang 23', 49'; Montilla 24', 43'; Reaso 81', 86'

November 5, 2022	Kaya–Iloilo	0–2	Far Eastern University	PFF National Training Center, Carmona
18:30		Report	Matunding 8'; Cristobal 81'

November 6, 2022	Ateneo de Manila	4–1	Stallion Laguna	PFF National Training Center, Carmona
16:00	Semacio 35', 72'; Corvera 60' (o.g.); Schroth 86'	Report	Benjamin 41'

November 6, 2022	Tuloy	2–1	University of Santo Tomas	PFF National Training Center, Carmona
18:30	Evangelista 61', 66'	Report	Absalon 44'

November 9, 2022	University of the Philippines	4–0	University of Santo Tomas	PFF National Training Center, Carmona
16:00	Mangrobang 7'; Reaso 44'; Napiza 73'; Ube 82'	Report

November 9, 2022	Kaya–Iloilo	3–1	Tuloy	PFF National Training Center, Carmona
18:30	Cadag 24', 40'; Lustan 35'	Report	Evangelista 36'

November 12, 2022	Far Eastern University	8–0	Azzurri	PFF National Training Center, Carmona
16:00	Tolentin 6', 36', 43', 72', 77', 79', 84'; Cristobal 35'	Report

November 12, 2022	Stallion Laguna	0–4	University of the Philippines	PFF National Training Center, Carmona
18:30		Report	Yatco 35'; Kim Yoo-jin 35'; Ube 54'; Narido 81'

November 13, 2022	University of Santo Tomas	0–3	Kaya–Iloilo	PFF National Training Center, Carmona
08:00		Report	Cadag 12', 34', 60'

November 13, 2022	Tuloy	3–2	Ateneo de Manila	PFF National Training Center, Carmona
10:00	Perez 26', 87'; Lucban 40'	Report	Semacio 42', 45'

November 16, 2022	Stallion Laguna	0–7	Tuloy	PFF National Training Center, Carmona
16:00		Report	Perez 15', 26'; Lucban 33'; Jalique 38'; Evangelista 41', 45', 56'

November 16, 2022	Ateneo de Manila	0–5	Far Eastern University	PFF National Training Center, Carmona
18:30		Report	Altiche 6'; Tolentin 22', 60', 63'; Bongol 88'

November 19, 2022	University of the Philippines	0–0	Tuloy	PFF National Training Center, Carmona
16:00		Report

November 19, 2022	Kaya–Iloilo	7–0	Ateneo de Manila	PFF National Training Center, Carmona
18:30	Navaja 3'; Cadag 16', 72'; Lustan 19', 26'; Ramores 64', 88'	Report

November 20, 2022	University of Santo Tomas	3–3	Azzurri	PFF National Training Center, Carmona
08:00	Bennet 17'; Logastua 48'; Sy 79'	Report	Aliping 11'; Muros 35', 88'

November 20, 2022	Far Eastern University	6–0	Stallion Laguna	PFF National Training Center, Carmona
10:00	Bongol 12'; Tuliao 20'; Miravite 45'; Rebosura 63', 76'; Tolentin 90'	Report

November 23, 2022	Azzurri	2–2	Stallion Laguna	PFF National Training Center, Carmona
16:00	Muros 44' (pen.), 47'	Report	Tolis 9'; Pachecjo 45+1' (pen.)

November 23, 2022	University of the Philippines	0–1	Kaya–Iloilo	PFF National Training Center, Carmona
18:30		Report	Cadag 35'

November 26, 2022	Azzurri	1–7	Tuloy	PFF National Training Center, Carmona
16:00	Ballares 81'	Report	Evangelista 8', 14', 86'; Rollon 25'; Perez 39'; Lucban 44'

November 26, 2022	University of Santo Tomas	2–1	Ateneo de Manila	PFF National Training Center, Carmona
18:30	Añonuevo 17'; Absalon 64'	Report	Semacio 54'

November 27, 2022	Stallion Laguna	0–15	Kaya–Iloilo	PFF National Training Center, Carmona
08:00		Report	Cadag 15', 36', 42', 44'; Naval 19' (o.g.); Lustan 22'; Sullano 25'; Bernal 35'; Ramores 37', 89'; Dacanay 45+2'; Navaja 53'; Dahildahil 59'; Belluga 75'; Ariel 87'

November 27, 2022	Far Eastern University	2–0	University of the Philippines	PFF National Training Center, Carmona
10:00	Tolentin 3'; Rebosura 37'	Report

November 30, 2022	Ateneo de Manila	2–1	Azzurri	PFF National Training Center, Carmona
16:00	Semacio 24'; Dungo 69'	Report	Muros 45'

November 30, 2022	Far Eastern University	0–1	University of Santo Tomas	PFF National Training Center, Carmona
18:30		Report	Fernandez 8'

December 3, 2022	University of Santo Tomas	9–0	Stallion Laguna	Rizal Memorial Stadium, Manila
18:30	Danao 8'; Solite 8' (o.g.); Fernandez 24', 65', 90+1'; Prado 36', 38', 74'; Asilo 86'	Report

December 3, 2022	Tuloy	1–0	Far Eastern University	Rizal Memorial Stadium, Manila
21:00	Perez 77'	Report

December 3, 2022	Ateneo de Manila	1–2	University of the Philippines	PFF National Training Center, Carmona
18:30	Semacio 90+3'	Report	Ube 71'; Reaso 90+20'

December 3, 2022	Azzurri	1–5	Kaya–Iloilo	PFF National Training Center, Carmona
21:00	Muros 82'	Report	Cadag 10', 41', 45+1'; Ramores 22'; Dimaandal 74'

=== Knock-out stage ===
Kaya–Iloilo, Tuloy, Far Eastern University, and the University of the Philippines advanced to the semifinals, as the top four finishing teams in the group stage. The latter two advance to the final.

Semi-finals
December 11
Kaya–Iloilo	0 (4)
University of the Philippines	0 (5)
December 11
Tuloy	0
Far Eastern University	3

Final
December 17
University of the Philippines	0
Far Eastern University	2
Third place
December 17
Kaya–Iloilo	1
Tuloy	0

==== Semifinal ====
December 11, 2022	Kaya–Iloilo	0–0 (4–5 p)	University of the Philippines	PFF National Training Center, Carmona
16:00		Report (PFF / Tiebreaker Times)
	Penalties
	Bernal (penalty missed); Long (penalty scored); Cadag (penalty scored); Lustan (penalty scored); Lemoran (penalty scored); Palacios (penalty missed)		(penalty scored) Ube; (penalty scored) Yatco; (penalty scored) Narido; (penalty scored) Talbot; (penalty missed) Baroin; (penalty scored) Borra

December 11, 2022	Tuloy	0–3	Far Eastern University	PFF National Training Center, Carmona
18:30		Report	Magbitang 18'; Cayabyab 60'; Tolentin 79'

==== Third place ====
December 17, 2022
16:00

Kaya–Iloilo	1–0	Tuloy
Ramores 83'	Report

PFF National Training Center, Carmona

==== Final ====
December 17, 2022
19:00

University of the Philippines	0–2	Far Eastern University
	Report	Cayabyab 17'; Cuenco 90'

PFF National Training Center, Carmona

== Awards ==
Award	Winner	Club
Most Valuable Player	Dionesa Tolentin	Far Eastern University
Golden Boot	Shelah Mae Cadag	Kaya-Iloilo
Best Goalkeeper	Frances Acelo	University of the Philippines
Best Midfielder	Charisa Lemoran	Kaya-Iloilo
Best Defender	Jennifer Baroin	University of the Philippines

== Statistics ==
=== Top goalscorers ===
Rank	Player	Club	Goals
1	(Philippines) Shelah Mae Cadag	Kaya–Iloilo	15
2	(Philippines) Dionesa Tolentin	Far Eastern University	13
3	(Philippines) Louraine Evangelista	Tuloy	9
4	(Philippines) Joyce Semacio	Ateneo de Manila	7
7	(Philippines) Hannah Muros	Azzurri	6
7	(Philippines) Sheen Ramores	Kaya–Iloilo	6
7	(Philippines) Jenny Perez	Tuloy	6
8	(Philippines) Alyssa Ube	University of the Philippines	5
9	(Philippines) Hazel Lustan	Kaya–Iloilo	4
9	(Philippines) Aurea Reaso	University of the Philippines	4
9	(Philippines) Lovely Fernandez	University of Santo Tomas	4
