= 2024 PFF Women's Cup =

Tournament details
- Country: Philippines
- Dates: October 13 – December 9, 2024
- Teams: 6

Final positions
- Champions: Stallion Laguna (1st title)
- Runners-up: Kaya–Iloilo
- Third place: Manila Digger

Tournament statistics
- Matches played: 15
- Goals scored: 95 (6.33 per match)
- Top goal scorer: (Mexico) Julissa Cisneros (11 goals)

Awards
- Best player: Chandler McDaniel

The 2024 PFF Women's Cup was the 4th edition of the cup competition. Six teams competed for this season which lasted from October 13 to December 9, 2024. Far Eastern University is the previous edition's champion, but is unable to defend their title.

The competition was publicly announced in September 2024, and is meant to be a qualification tournament for the 2025 PFF Women's League season. Coca-Cola Philippines serve as the title sponsor.

The tournament was projected to have ten match days, most of them to be played at the Rizal Memorial Stadium in Manila. Some matches were played at Arca Open Field and the McKinley Hill Stadium; both in Taguig. The format consist of a single round robin phase where the top four teams advanced to the semifinals.

Stallion Laguna won their first title by winning 1–0 over Kaya–Iloilo in the Final.

== Participating teams ==
There are six participating teams. Collegiate teams, who are usually staples of the competition, did not enter due to the conduct of the UAAP Season 87 women's football championship.

Entrants
6 clubs
- Azzurri
- Beach Hut
- Kaya–Iloilo
- Manila Digger
- Stallion Laguna
- Tuloy

== Results ==
=== Preliminary round ===
Pos	Team	Pld	W	D	L	GF	GA	GD	Pts	Qualification	STA	KAY	MDG	BHT	TLY	AZR
1	Stallion Laguna (C)	5	4	0	1	33	3	+30	12 (Note: Head-to-head points: Stallion Laguna 1–0 Kaya–Iloilo, Manila Digger 1–2 Kaya–Iloilo Manila Digger's matches against Azzurri and Beach Hut are considered as wins. It is uncertain if the goal in the Azzurri match is recognized or if there are any goals awarded in both cancelled games for the purpose of the standings.)	Semifinals	—	1–0	2–1	—	—	—
2	Kaya–Iloilo	5	4	0	1	27	5	+22	12	Semifinals	—	—	—	11–0	6–3	8–0
3	Manila Digger	5	4	0	1	8	4	+4	12	Semifinals	—	1–2	—	—	4–1	~~Nov 10~~
4	Beach Hut	5	2	0	3	8	23	−15	6	Semifinals	0–9	—	—	—	—	5–1
5	Tuloy	5	1	0	4	15	20	−5	3		1–7	—	—	2–3	—	—
6	Azzurri	5	0	0	5	1	37	−36	0		0–15	—	—	—	0–8	—

Source: PFFWL
(C) Champions
Notes:

October 13	Stallion Laguna	1–2	Manila Digger	Rizal Memorial Stadium, Manila
16:00	Fields 3'	Report	Caliz 52'; Quezada 60'

October 13	Beach Hut	5–1	Azzurri	Rizal Memorial Stadium, Manila
19:00	Abellar 13', 18'; Maybuena 27', 76'; Valencia 44'	Report	Torre 56'

October 18	Kaya–Iloilo	6–3	Tuloy	Rizal Memorial Stadium, Manila
18:00	Cisneros 1', 31' (pen.); Rodriguez 13', 66', 70'; Lemoran 17'	Report	Bandoja 56', 68', 81'	Referee: Jycellia Diong

October 18	Beach Hut	0–9	Stallion Laguna	Rizal Memorial Stadium, Manila
20:30		Report	Wetherell 13'; Bostard 22', 31', 70'; San Buenaventura 37'; Fields 41'; Alquiros 48'; K. McDaniel 56'; O'Brien 68'	Referee: Timothy De Castro

November 4	Tuloy	1–7	Stallion Laguna	Rizal Memorial Stadium, Manila
16:00	Rollon 88'	Report	C. McDaniel 17', 23' (pen.); Fields 29', 80'; Wetherell 45+1', 58'; O'Brien 70'	Referee: Chrismel Cayabyab

November 4	Kaya–Iloilo	8–0	Azzurri	Rizal Memorial Stadium, Manila
19:00	Cisneros 5', 29', 56', 61'; Borra 16'; Cadag 24'; Alcantara 71'; Borres 74'	Report		Referee: Jesus Abogado

November 10	Kaya–Iloilo	11–0	Beach Hut	McKinley Hill Stadium, Taguig
16:00	Long 8', 22'; Cadag 11', 47'; Rodriguez 33'; Soon 33' (o.g.); Cisneros 45+2', 45+4', 54', 63'; S. Castañeda 90+2'	Report		Referee: Jesus Abogado

November 10	Manila Digger	1–0; Cancelled (Note: The match was halted at the 30th minute and later postponed due to 'inclement weather'. The game was eventually cancelled.)	Azzurri	McKinley Hill Stadium, Taguig
19:00	Quezada 23'	Report

November 22	Manila Digger	1–2	Kaya–Iloilo	Rizal Memorial Stadium, Manila
16:00	Lustan 68'	Report	Rodriguez 5', 51'

November 22	Azzurri	0–8	Tuloy	Rizal Memorial Stadium, Manila
19:00		Report	Ortillo 3', 24', 42', 45'; Sara 48'; Calamatan 54', 72'; Mercardo 88'

November 25	Manila Digger	4–1	Tuloy	Rizal Memorial Stadium, Manila
19:00	Quezada 9', 48', 55'; Fountain 76'	Report	Ortillo 83'

November 28	Azzurri	0–15	Stallion Laguna	Arca Open Field, Taguig
17:00		Report	C. McDaniel 10', 15', 55', 61', 81'; Fields 22', 45+1', 51', 54', 59'; Wetherell 25', 33', 36', 69'; San Buenaventura 90'

December 1	Tuloy	2–3	Beach Hut	McKinley Hill Stadium, Taguig
15:00	Ortillo 37', 90+3'	Report	Salazar 82' (pen.), 89'; Soon 84' (pen.)

December 1	Stallion Laguna	1–0	Kaya–Iloilo	McKinley Hill Stadium, Taguig
18:00	Fields 90+6'	Report

N/A	Beach Hut	Cancelled (Note: Manila Digger did not play a match against Beach Hut in the single round robin.)	Manila Digger

=== Knock-out stage ===
Semifinals
1	Stallion Laguna	w/o
4	Beach Hut
2	Kaya–Iloilo	2
3	Manila Digger	1

Finals
1	Stallion Laguna	1
2	Kaya–Iloilo	0
Third place
4	Beach Hut
3	Manila Digger	w/o

==== Semifinal ====
December 4	Stallion Laguna	Forfeited (Note: Beach Hut forfeited their semifinals match giving Stallion Laguna a walkover to the final. It was not immediately confirmed if they will play in the third place match. However, the conduct of a third place match was not announced when the organizers confirmed the final scheduled for December 9.)	Beach Hut	McKinley Hill Stadium, Taguig

December 4	Kaya–Iloilo	2–1	Manila Digger	McKinley Hill Stadium, Taguig
19:00	Cisneros 26'; Long 50'	Report	Caliz 57'

==== Third place match ====
December 9	Beach Hut	Cancelled (Note: A third place match was originally scheduled but was not held. Manila Digger was awarded third place.)	Manila Digger	Rizal Memorial Stadium, Manila

==== Final ====
December 9	Stallion Laguna	1–0	Kaya–Iloilo	Rizal Memorial Stadium, Manila
19:00	C. McDaniel 2'	Report

== Awards ==
Award	Winner	Club
Fair Play Award	Tuloy	
Most Valuable Player	(Philippines) Chandler McDaniel	Stallion Laguna
Top Scorer	(Mexico) Julissa Cisneros	Kaya–Iloilo
Best Goalkeeper	(Philippines) Olivia McDaniel	Stallion Laguna
Best Midfielder	(United States) Katrina Wetherell	Stallion Laguna
Best Defender	(Philippines) Hali Long	Kaya-Iloilo

Source: Daily Tribune

== Statistics ==
=== Top goalscorers ===
Rank	Player	Club	Goals
1	(Mexico) Julissa Cisneros	Kaya–Iloilo	11
2	(United States) Jamia Fields	Stallion Laguna	10
3	(Philippines) Chandler McDaniel	Stallion Laguna	8
4	(Philippines) Lanie Ortillo	Tuloy	7
4	(United States) Katrina Wetherell	Stallion Laguna	7
6	(Philippines) Camille Rodriguez	Kaya–Iloilo	6
7	(Philippines) Quinley Quezada	Manila Digger	5
8	(Philippines) Isabella Bandoja	Tuloy	3
8	(Philippines) Shelah Cadag	Kaya–Iloilo	3
8	(United States) Haley Bostard	Stallion Laguna	3
