= Julissa Cisneros =

Mexican soccer player

Personal information
- Full name: Julissa Cisneros Ávila
- Date of birth: May 23, 2000 (age 26)
- Place of birth: United States
- Height: 1.62 m (5 ft 4 in)
- Position: Forward

Team information
- Current team: Selangor
- Number: 29

College career
Years	Team	Apps	(Gls)
2018–2021	Missouri Tigers	68	(22)
2022	SMU Mustangs	11	(8)

Senior career*
Years	Team	Apps	(Gls)
2024	Cruz Azul	4	(0)
2024–	Kaya–Iloilo	20	(24)
2026–	Selangor	2	(5)
- * Club domestic league appearances and goals as of May 3, 2025

Julissa Cisneros Ávila (born May 23, 2000) is a Mexican football (soccer) player who plays as a forward for Selangor of the Malaysia National Women's League.

== Career ==
=== College ===
Cisneros played for the Missouri Tigers from 2018 to 2021 and the SMU Mustangs in 2022.

=== Club ===
==== Cruz Azul ====
On January 8, 2024, Cruz Azul announced the signing of Cisneros.

==== Kaya–Iloilo ====
In September 2024, Cisneros moved to the Philippines to play for Kaya–Iloilo following a suggestion from Maya Alcantara a month prior back in California. She led her club to the runner-up finish at the 2024 PFF Women's Cup and was the top scorer in the tournament with 11 goals. She also featured in Kaya's stint at the 2024–25 AFC Women's Champions League.

She continued playing for the club at the 2025 season of the PFF Women's League, where her team won the tournament and was once again the Golden Boot recipient with 13 goals.

== International career ==
Cisneros was called up to participate in the virtual camp for the Mexico U20 national team in 2020.

== Personal life ==
Cisneros is born in the United States but has dual citizenship due to her parents who were born in Mexico. Moreno Valley, California, is her hometown.

== Honours ==
Kaya–Iloilo

- PFF Women's League: 2025

Individual

- PFF Women's League Golden Boot: 2025
