= Jamia Fields =

American soccer player (born 1993)

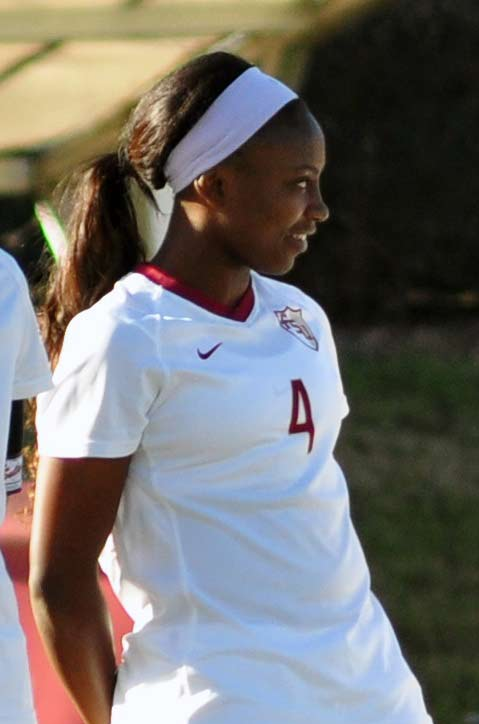

Personal information
- Full name: Jamia Ayanna Fields
- Date of birth: September 24, 1993 (age 33)
- Place of birth: Alta Loma, California, United States
- Height: 1.65 m (5 ft 5 in)
- Positions: Forward; defender

College career
Years	Team	Apps	(Gls)
2011–2014	Florida State Seminoles	103	(14)

Senior career*
Years	Team	Apps	(Gls)
2015	Western New York Flash	10	(1)
2016–2017	Orlando Pride	28	(0)
2018	Arna-Bjørnar	8	(0)
2018	Avaldsnes IL	8	(1)
2019–2021	Houston Dash	24	(0)
2022	Washington Spirit	1	(0)
2023	Valur	4	(2)
2024	Stallion Laguna	14	(10)

International career
2010	United States U17		
2011	United States U20		
- * Club domestic league appearances and goals as of May 12, 2025

Jamia Ayanna Fields (born September 24, 1993) is an American soccer forward and defender who is currently a free agent. Off the field, Fields is an entrepreneur and creative director behind Stoic Los Angeles, a high-fashion streetwear brand. In addition to her work in fashion, she is active as a sports model and influencer, collaborating with major athletic and lifestyle brands. Fields also serves on the board of the Black Women’s Player Collective, a nonprofit organization founded by current and former professional soccer players to advance opportunities, representation, and community development for Black girls and women in the sport.

== Early life ==
She was born in Alta Loma, California. She attended Florida State University, where she was part of the Florida State Seminoles team that won the 2014 NCAA Division I Women's Soccer Tournament, scoring the game winning goal in their 1-0 win against Virginia.

== Club career ==
Fields was drafted by the Boston Breakers with the 14th pick in the 2015 NWSL College Draft. Fields would sign with the Western New York Flash for the 2015 season. She was selected by the Orlando Pride in the 2015 Expansion Draft. On March 28, 2018, Fields announced she was joining Arna-Bjørnar in the Toppserien in Norway. Fields signed with Avaldsnes IL on July 28, 2018. Fields was signed by Houston Dash for the 2019 NWSL season through the 2021 season. Fields later went on to play for the Washington Spirit, Valur, and Stallion Laguna in the following years.

== Personal life ==
Her hobbies includes horseback riding, hiking, playing tennis, and snowboarding.

== Honors ==
Houston Dash

- NWSL Challenge Cup Champion: 2020
