= Olivia McDaniel =

Filipino footballer (born 1997)

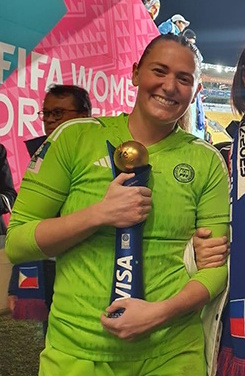
- Davies-McDaniel in 2023

Personal information
- Full name: Olivia Alexandra Davies McDaniel
- Date of birth: October 14, 1997 (age 29)
- Place of birth: Laguna Beach, California, U.S.
- Height: 5 ft 8 in (1.72 m)
- Position: Goalkeeper

Youth career
- Norco Cougars

College career
Years	Team	Apps	(Gls)
2015	Cal State Fullerton Titans		
2016–2019	Milwaukee Panthers	11	(0)

Senior career*
Years	Team	Apps	(Gls)
–2023	So Cal Union		
2023	Stallion Laguna	1	(0)
2023	Pinzgau Saalfelden	3	(0)
2024	Santos	6	(0)
2024–	Stallion Laguna	8	(1)

International career^{‡}
2021–	Philippines	67	(0)
Medal record
Women's football
Representing the Philippines
ASEAN Women's Championship
Winner	2022 Philippines	Team
Southeast Asian Games
Gold medal – first place	2025 Thailand	Team
Bronze medal – third place	2021 Vietnam	Team
- * Club domestic league appearances and goals as of March 30, 2025 ‡ National team caps and goals as of September 25, 2026

Olivia Alexandra Davies Isip McDaniel (born October 14, 1997), is a professional footballer who plays as a goalkeeper. Born in the United States, she represents the Philippines at international level.

== Early life ==
McDaniel was born in Laguna Beach, California and raised in Corona, California. She has attended the Norco High School. Her mother Lindy Isip is a Filipina who has roots in Pampanga and Davao City, while her father Clint is a soccer coach. She started playing football when she was seven years old.

During her youth soccer career, McDaniel was invited to Olympic Development Programs and US National Team ID Camps. When McDaniel was 12, she was allowed to train with the Philippines national team at a training camp in California after her mother reached out to Ernie Nierras.

== College career ==
McDaniel has attended the California State University, Fullerton and the University of Wisconsin–Milwaukee, where she graduated in 2020.

== Club career ==
McDaniel had played for the American club, So Cal Union FC, which is based in Temecula, California. After her stint in the 2023 FIFA Women's World Cup, she along with her sister Chandler joined Stallion Laguna of the PFF Women's League. They left and went back to the United States after losing their debut match against La Salle.

On March 7, 2024, McDaniel was announced at Campeonato Brasileiro de Futebol Feminino Série A1 side Santos, joining compatriot Reina Bonta. Despite overtaking Karen Hipólito in the starting eleven, she lost her spot to Kelly Chiavaro, and was released on July 12.

McDaniel went back to Stallion Laguna for their participation in the 2024 PFF Women's Cup. The club won the title with McDaniel named as best goalkeeper. In the 2025 PFF Women's League, McDaniel scored the sole and winning goal in Stallion's game against Makati FC in June 2025.

== International career ==
McDaniel made her debut with the Philippines women's national team at the 2021 AFC Women's Asian Cup Qualifiers, where she was subbed in near the end of the game. McDaniel has represented the Philippines at the 2022 AFC Women's Asian Cup qualifiers. She was part of the team which played in the historic quarterfinals match against Chinese Taipei which went on to a penalty shootout after a 1–1 draw. She saved two penalties by Taiwan and successfully made a penalty kick herself. As a result, the Philippines qualified for the 2023 FIFA Women's World Cup, the country's first ever World Cup, in both men and women's categories.

She played as the first-string goalkeeper at the 2023 Women's World Cup. During the team's second group stage match against New Zealand, she made numerous key saves, including a critical save in the 93rd minute. As a result, McDaniel was named Player of the Match.

Olivia McDaniel had her 50th international cap on July 2, 2025, during the Philippines 6–0 win against Cambodia in the 2026 AFC Women's Asian Cup qualifiers.

== Personal life ==
McDaniel's sister, Chandler, is also a Philippines women's international footballer, while their brother, Finn, plays for the men's national team; the siblings all play for Stallion Laguna. Their father, Clint, is part of the said team's coaching staff.

== Career statistics ==
=== International ===
As of match played 14 September 2026

Appearances and goals by national team and year
National team	Year	Apps	Goals
Philippines	2021	1	0
Philippines	2022	18	0
Philippines	2023	18	0
Philippines	2024	7	0
Philippines	2025	15	0
Philippines	2026	5	0
Total		64	0

== Honors ==
Stallion Laguna

- PFF Women's Cup: 2024

Philippines

- Southeast Asian Games Bronze Medal: 2021
- ASEAN Women's Championship: 2022
- Southeast Asian Games Gold Medal: 2025
