= Ulinzi Starlets =

- Full name: Ulinzi Starlets Football Club
- Nicknames: The Soldiers, Pride Queens of KDF
- Founded: 2020; 6 years ago
- Ground: Ulinzi Sports Complex, Lang'ata, Nairobi
- Capacity: 10,000
- Owner: Kenya Defence Forces
- League: Kenyan Women's Premier League
- 2025–26: Women's Premier League, 2nd (in progress)
- Website: ulinzistarletsfc.team

Ulinzi Starlets Football Club is a Kenyan women's association football club based at Ulinzi Sports Complex in Lang'ata, Nairobi. The club is the women's section of the Kenya Defence Forces (KDF) and the female counterpart to the men's side Ulinzi Stars F.C. It competes in the Kenyan Women's Premier League, the top tier of women's football in Kenya.

Since reaching the top flight in 2020, the club has won the FKF Women's Cup three times (2021, 2023 and 2024) and the Kenya Women's Super Cup twice (2021 and 2023).

== History ==
=== Foundation and promotion (2020) ===
Ulinzi Starlets was established by the Kenya Defence Forces as the women's football arm of the military's sporting programme, alongside its men's counterpart Ulinzi Stars. The team competed in the second tier of Kenyan women's football in 2020 and won promotion to the Kenyan Women's Premier League at the first attempt.

=== First trophies (2021) ===
In October 2021, Ulinzi Starlets won the inaugural FKF Women's Cup, beating Vihiga Queens in the final at the Nakuru ASK Showground. The following month, the club added the Kenya Women's Super Cup, defeating Thika Queens on penalties in the final played on 7 November 2021.

=== Cup retention (2022–2024) ===
Ulinzi Starlets retained the FKF Women's Cup in June 2023, beating Nakuru City Queens 3–1 in the final at Nyayo National Stadium. Mercy Airo scored twice and Neddy Atieno added a third for the Soldiers; the team was managed by Joseph Wambua Mwanza, who described the side as "the FKF Cup heroines". The club finished third in the Kenyan Women's Premier League that season.

In March 2022, Wambua publicly described Ulinzi Starlets as having an unusually loyal fanbase in the women's league as the team competed in the upper half of the standings.

The club won the FKF Women's Cup for a third consecutive time in 2024, beating Kibera Soccer Ladies 2–1 in the final.

=== 2025–26 season ===
In the 2025–26 Kenyan Women's Premier League season, Ulinzi Starlets sat second in the table after 19 matches, with a record of 14 wins, two draws and three losses, 35 goals scored and 10 conceded. The team's leading league scorer was Mideva Elizabeth, with eight goals. The side was managed by head coach Oduor.

In January 2026, Ulinzi Starlets beat Bungoma Queens 2–1 away and Kibera Women FC 2–0 at home in consecutive league fixtures.

== Stadium ==
Ulinzi Starlets play their home matches at the Ulinzi Sports Complex, a 10,000-capacity multi-sport facility within the Kenya Defence Forces' Lang'ata Barracks in Nairobi. The complex was commissioned by President Uhuru Kenyatta in April 2022 and is shared with the men's side Ulinzi Stars F.C.

== Honours ==
- FKF Women's Cup
  - Winners (3): 2021, 2023, 2024
- Kenya Women's Super Cup
  - Winners (2): 2021, 2023
