= Griffin McDaniel =

Filipino footballer

Personal information
- Full name: Griffin Connor Isip McDaniel
- Date of birth: March 30, 2000 (age 26)
- Place of birth: Orange County, California, United States
- Height: 1.83 m (6 ft 0 in)
- Position: Attacking midfielder

Team information
- Current team: Stallion Laguna
- Number: 14

Youth career
- Norco Cougars

College career
Years	Team	Apps	(Gls)
2018–2020	California Baptist Lancers		

Senior career*
Years	Team	Apps	(Gls)
2020–2025	Stallion Laguna	26	(20)
2025	SV Drochtersen/Assel	0	(0)
2025	SV Drochtersen/Assel II	1	(0)
2025–	Stallion Laguna	15	(22)

International career^{‡}
2019	Philippines U22	1	(0)
2022	Philippines U23	2	(0)
2023–	Philippines	2	(0)
- * Club domestic league appearances and goals as of 22:14, 2 May 2026 (UTC) ‡ National team caps and goals as of 21:54, 2 May 2026 (UTC)

Griffin Connor Isip McDaniel (born March 30, 2000) is a professional footballer who plays as an attacking midfielder for Philippines Football League club Stallion Laguna. Born in the United States, he plays for the Philippines national team.

== Personal life ==
McDaniel was born in Orange County, California and raised in Corona, California. He has attended the Norco High School. His mother Lindy is a Filipino who has roots in Pampanga and Davao City, while his father Clint is an American who works as a football coach.

McDaniel's sisters, Olivia and Chandler, are Philippines women's international footballers.

== Career ==
=== College career ===
McDaniel played college soccer for California Baptist University. He played 13 games in his freshman year and 15 games in his sophomore year.

=== Stallion Laguna ===
In August 2020, McDaniel joined Philippines Football League club Stallion Laguna. He made his debut in a 2–1 defeat against league debutants Maharlika Manila.

== International career ==
McDaniel was born in the United States to an American father and a Filipino mother, making him eligible to play for both the United States and Philippines at international level.

=== Philippines U23 ===
McDaniel was called up to represent the Philippines U22 in the 2019 Southeast Asian Games held in the Philippines. He made his debut for the U22 team in a 2–1 defeat against Myanmar U22, coming in as a substitute replacing Chima Uzoka in the 75th minute.

In February 2022, McDaniel was called up to the Philippines U23 team for the 2022 AFF U-23 Youth Championship held in Cambodia.

== Career statistics ==
=== International ===
As of match played 11 June 2024

Appearances and goals by national team and year
National team	Year	Apps	Goals
Philippines	2023	1	0
Philippines	2024	1	0
Total		2	0
