= Let Dimzon =

Filipino football coach and former player

Personal information
- Full name: Marnelli Salvador Dimzon
- Date of birth: November 22, 1979 (age 46)
- Place of birth: Valenzuela, Metro Manila, Philippines
- Height: 1.63 m (5 ft 4 in)
- Position: Midfielder

Team information
- Current team: Capital1 Solar Strikers (head coach)

College career
Years	Team	Apps	(Gls)
1998–2002	Far Eastern University		

International career
1998–2008	Philippines		
c. 2009	Philippines futsal		

Managerial career
- 2010–2016: Far Eastern University
- c. 2014: Philippines U14 (women)
- 2016: Philippines U16 (women)
- 2017: Philippines (women)
- 2018–2019: Philippines (women)
- 2019–2024: Kaya-Iloilo (women)
- 2021–2022: Philippines U18 (women)
- 2022: Philippines (women) (assistant)
- 2023: Guam (women) (assistant)
- 2024–: Far Eastern University
- 2025–: Capital1 Solar Strikers

Marnelli "Let" Salvador Dimzon (born November 22, 1979) is a Filipina football coach and former player. She is currently the head coach for the women's team of UAAP team Far Eastern University and also the Capital1 Solar Strikers.

A midfielder, Dimzon played in the collegiate level for the Far Eastern University (FEU) Lady Tamaraw Booters with whom she won back-to-back UAAP titles: in season 63 (2000–01), in which she was the most valuable player (MVP), and in season 64 (2001–02). Internationally, she played for the Philippine women's national team in the 2003 AFC Women's Championship and four Southeast Asian Games from 2001 to 2007.

Becoming head coach of the FEU Lady Tamaraw Booters in 2010, she led them to the UAAP Season 73 (2010–11) title and the three-peat in seasons 75 (2012–13) through 77 (2014–15). She had also served as head coach of the Philippine women's national team in the youth and senior levels. In 2019, she also became head coach of Kaya Women's.

== Early and personal life ==
Marnelli "Letlet" Salvador was born on November 22, 1979, in Valenzuela, Metro Manila. Her father was a tricycle driver while her mother was a food vendor. She was a track and field athlete from grade school until her freshman year at Far Eastern University in Manila. She was a middle-distance runner under Elma Muros. She switched to FEU's football team under Orlando Plagata in a bid to retain her scholarship.

She married fellow footballer Jimmy Dimzon in 2004; they have one daughter.

== Playing career ==
=== College ===
In 1998, when she was a sophomore at Far Eastern University (FEU), she joined the FEU Lady Tamaraw Booters of the University Athletic Association of the Philippines (UAAP). In the UAAP Season 63 (2000–01) finals series, FEU defeated the De La Salle Lady Booters who were favorites to win after sweeping the elimination round. Salvador was awarded the most valuable player (MVP) award for her performance. In the following season, she contributed to FEU's title defense, where they again faced De La Salle in the final. In 2002, she dropped out from FEU after failing a math course. She then decided to go into coaching. Nine years later, in 2011, she decided to return to college and earned her financial management degree in 2013.

=== International ===
Dimzon was part of the Philippines women's national football team and played as early as 1990s when the team was still coached by Orlando Plagata. She took part in the 2003 AFC Women's Championship. She was part of the squad that played 4 times at the Southeast Asian Games in 2001, 2003, 2005, and 2007. She was part of the national team until 2008.

Dimzon was also part of the Irok Women's futsal team under head coach Emmanuel Batungbacal. In 2017, she attended a coaching seminar dedicated for women coaches in China.

=== Style of play ===
Marielle Benitez, Dimzon's national team teammate and former collegiate rival, described her as a "fast player who could play in the center or on the wings. She could deliver crosses accurately [and] she was also one of the best headers."

== Coaching career ==
Her coaching career began when she was still a college student. She needed a part-time job due to her parents' having difficulties to provide her financial needs during college.

Sometime after putting her collegiate studies on hold in 2002, then women's national team head coach Marlon Maro offered her coaching assignments in the grassroots level. After her five-year stint with the national team, Dimzon decided to fully pursue her coaching career.

In 2014, Dimzon accomplished and bested an international coaching course by the German Football Federation which was attended by 29 participants.

=== FEU Lady Booters ===
Dimzon later served as assistant coach for the FEU Lady Booters under Malou Rubio from 2005 to 2009 and Kim Chul-soo in 2009. She was appointed as head coach of the FEU women's team in 2010. Under her watch FEU won three consecutive titles (UAAP Seasons 75, 76, and 77) They also won in UAAP Season 73.

=== Philippines girls youth ===
Dimzon led the girl's under-14 national team to the finals of the AFC U-14 Girls ASEAN Regional Championship. They ended up as runners-up of the tournament with Thailand beating them in the finals. The feat was the best performance of their age group.

She coached the under-16 team which participated at the 2017 AFC U-16 Women's Championship qualifiers.

=== Philippines senior women ===
In July 2017 it was reported that Dimzon was appointed as head coach of the Philippines women's senior team and is tasked to mentor the team at the 2017 Southeast Asian Games which is to take place the next month. She was formally succeeded by English coach, Richard Boon in November 2017. Dimzon was appointed back into the post on August 23, 2018, standing in for Buda Bautista who declined from resuming her post due to scheduling conflict. Dimzon was appointed with the condition that the Rizal Memorial Stadium made available for training use by the national team to help her deal with her commitments with the Far Easter University and other clubs. For her second senior national team stint, Dimzon will lead the Philippines in the 2020 Summer Olympics qualifiers.

In 2022, she was appointed as assistant coach.

=== Kaya Women ===
In July 2019, Dimzon was announced as head coach of Kaya. She led them to a sweep of the 2022 SingaCup's Women Football Championship—their first eleven-a-side campaign, as well as their international debut.

She helped the club win the 2023 PFF Women's League title and oversaw their participation in the 2024–25 AFC Women's Champions League.

In December 2024 after the 2024 PFF Women's Cup, Dimzon announced her departure from the team.

=== Capital1 Solar Spikers ===
Dimzon joined newly formed PFF Women's League team Capital1 Solar Strikers which was launched to the public in March 2025. Dimzon is still concurrent coach of FEU and schedules the training of Capital1 in consideration of her role with her collegiate team.

== Honors ==
=== Player ===
FEU Lady Booters

- UAAP: Champions 1998, 2001, 2002; third place: 2000

=== Coach ===
FEU Lady Booters

- PFF Women's Cup*: Champions 2015
- UAAP: Champions 2007, 2011, 2013, 2014, and 2015

Philippines U14

- AFC U-14 Girls ASEAN Regional Championship: Runner-up 2014

Kaya

- PFF Women's League: 2023
- SingaCup's Women Football Championship: 2022

(*) Also Champions of the 2014 PFF Women's Cup, but the edition followed a 9-a-side format.
