= Kiara Fontanilla =

Filipino footballer (born 2000)

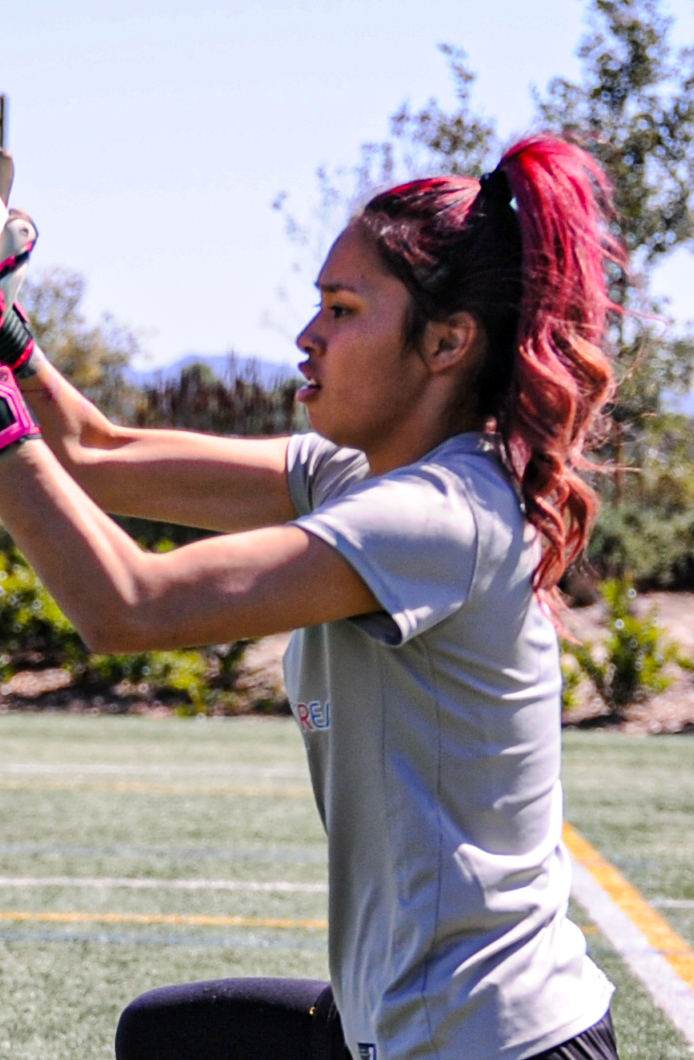
- Fontanilla in 2022

Personal information
- Full name: Kiara Fabiola Reyes Fontanilla
- Date of birth: July 1, 2000 (age 26)
- Place of birth: Fullerton, California, United States
- Height: 5 ft 7 in (1.70 m)
- Position: Goalkeeper

Team information
- Current team: FC Pyunik
- Number: 88

Youth career
- 2013–2018: Arsenal FC EGSL
- –2017: Norco Cougars

College career
Years	Team	Apps	(Gls)
2018	NWOSU Rangers	9	(0)
2019	Fullerton Titans		
2020–2021	EOU Mountaineers	11	(0)
2022	Westcliff Warriors	11	(0)

Senior career*
Years	Team	Apps	(Gls)
2023	Central Coast Mariners		
2024	Manila Digger	8	(0)
2025	Kaya–Iloilo	4	(0)
2025–	FC Pyunik	1	(0)

International career^{‡}
2022–	Philippines	9	(0)
Medal record
Women's football
Representing the Philippines
ASEAN Women's Championship
Winner	2022 Philippines	Team
- * Club domestic league appearances and goals as of October 30, 2021. ‡ National team caps and goals as of 30 July 2023.

Kiara Fabiola Reyes Fontanilla (born July 1, 2000) is a professional footballer who plays as a goalkeeper for Armenian Women's Premier League side FC Pyunik. Born in the United States, she represents the Philippines at international level.

== Early life ==
Fontanilla was born in Fullerton, California to a Mexican mother, Fabiola (née Reyes), and a Filipino father, Francisco Fontanilla but was raised in Jurupa Valley and Eastvale. Her father has roots in Baguio having moved to the United States at age seven. She attended Norco High School where she graduated in 2018. She attended the Northwestern Oklahoma State University for her freshman year before moving to the California State University, Fullerton the following year. She then moved to the Eastern Oregon University in 2020.

== Early career ==
Fontanilla played for the varsity women's football (soccer) team of Norco High School under head coach Daniel Graffa. She was a two-year varsity letterwinner. In her senior season in 2017, she led her team to the California Interscholastic Federation. She also played for local soccer club Arsenal FC where she helped make it to six consecutive editions of the Surf Cup from 2013 to 2018.

== College career ==
As a freshman, Fontanilla played for the Northwestern Oklahoma State Rangers. She became part of the Cal State Fullerton Titans women's soccer team for the 2019 season. She redshirted for her sophomore season. She was part of the Titans squad which won the Big West regular season Conference Championship and Tournament Championship. In the 2020 season, she joined the Eastern Oregon Mountaineers. In 2022, she transferred to a school in Southern California so she could focus on her club soccer career.

== Club career ==
In 2023, Fontanilla began playing for the Central Coast Mariners. She is a top-ranked goalkeeper in the FNSW Women's League One.

Fontanilla entered the 2024 draft for the National Women's Soccer League.

=== Manila Digger ===
In July 2024, after weeks of training with the team, the club officially announced the signing of the Philippines international goalkeeper, along with compatriot Rhea Chan.

== International career ==
Fontanilla is eligible to represent the Philippines through her Filipino father. However, she had to secure Filipino citizenship for herself and her father who has not been in the Philippines for the past 40 years. She is part of the Philippines squad which participated in the 2022 AFC Women's Asian Cup in India. A third-choice keeper for the tournament, she made her senior national team debut in the Philippines' 0–4 loss to Australia.

Fontanilla was named a member of the Philippines women's national team for the 2023 FIFA World Cup.

== Honours ==
=== International ===
==== Philippines ====
- ASEAN Women's Championship: 2022
