= Makati F.C. =

Makati
- Full name: Makati Football Club
- Short name: MFC
- Founded: 1976; 50 years ago
- CEO: Selu Lozano
- Manager: Dan Padernal
- League: PFF Women's League
- 2025: PFF Women's League, 4th of 6

Makati Football Club (MFC) is a Philippine youth football club. Founded by Tomas Lozano, the club is a regular participant of the Gothia Cup. The club participated in the 2025 PFF Women's League.

== History ==
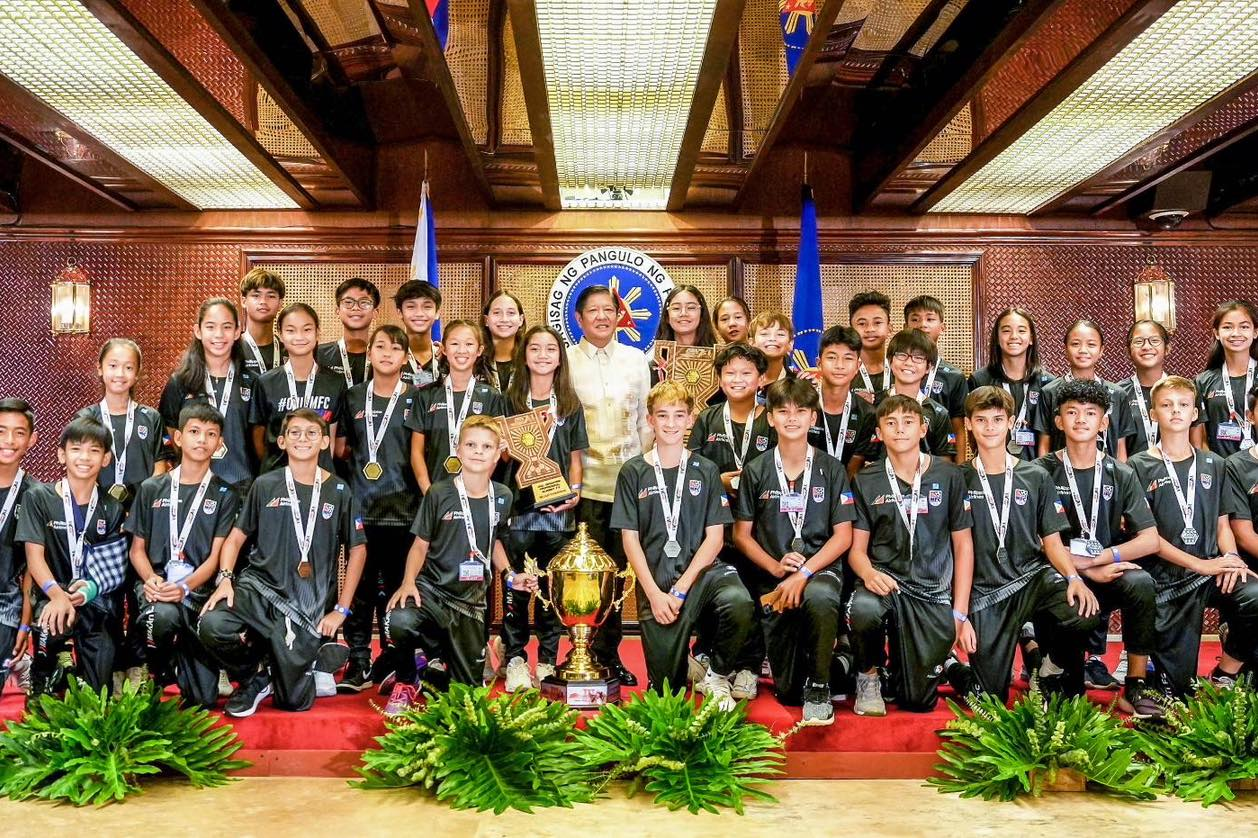
Makati F.C. players with Philippine president Bongbong Marcos. April 2023.

The Makati Football Club (MFC) was founded in 1976 by former Real Madrid player Tomas Lozano. The club has been sending numerous youth teams to the Gothia Cup in Sweden since 1983. MFC has sent both boys' and girls' sides. MFC's best finish in the tournament was in 1985, where its boys under-11 team won their age-group's tournament. Other podium finishes were third place for the boy's under-12 in 1986, and another third-place finish for the boy's under-12 in 2016

MFC entered a partnership with Alaska Milk Corporation in 1996 which led to the establishment of the recurring Alaska Cup youth football tournament.

In 2019, MFC's entered a partnership with Philippines Football League club Stallion Laguna with its football academy merging with Stallion's for at least the 2019 season.

The COVID-19 pandemic disrupted the club's operation. The 2021 Gothia Cup, which MFC was due to participate for the 38th time, was cancelled. MFC's football academy also resorted to conducting its sporting programs online.

MFC returned to competing in football competitions outside the Philippines since the start of the pandemic. Their return was marked by their participation in the 2022 edition of the JSSL Singapore Professional Academy 7s. They clinched the overall title of the same tournament in 2023.

In December 2023, the club announced that it would be expanding operations to Cebu City. Makati FC Cebu was established the following year.

The girls team reinforced by imports won the 2025 Ang Liga Filipina U19 title.

Makati F.C. joined the PFF Women's League, the top-flight women's domestic league in the country starting the 2025 season with a relatively young squad with Indonesian national team players.

== Current roster ==
The following is Makati's roster for the 2025 PFF Women's League:

As of May 17, 2025

Note: Flags indicate national team as defined under FIFA eligibility rules; some limited exceptions apply. Players may hold more than one non-FIFA nationality.

No.	Pos.	Nation	Player
1	GK	GHA	Ayishatu Simpson
3	DF	PHI	Maeva Javier
5	DF	IDN	Gea Yumanda
7		PHI	Ariana Gementiza
8		PHI	Ella Chua
10	MF	PHI	Rhiauna de la Calzada
12	FW	GHA	Veronica Appiah
13	DF	PHI	Lauren Tiangco
14	DF	PHI	Elisha Lubiano
15	DF	PHI	Julia Kabatay
16		PHI	Summer Solis
19	FW	PHI	Martina Horn

No.	Pos.	Nation	Player
20	DF	PHI	Adriana Bautista
21	FW	PHI	Soleil Schroth
22	GK	PHI	Brooke Solis
23		PHI	Mikaela Villacin
24	GK	PHI	Hazel Arce
25	DF	GHA	Selina Anima
27		PHI	Tootchie Eval
30	DF	PHI	Jilliana Dagpin
32		THA	Kawinthida Kikuntod
33	DF	PHI	Carlene Dy
70	MF	IDN	Nafeeza Nori
87	FW	PHI	Angely Alferez
—		PHI	Shinezen Cadayona
—	MF	IDN	Nasywa Rambe

== Notable players ==
List of notable players who have played for Makati F.C. and/or have attended its Makati Football School.

- Aly Borromeo – Philippines men's national team player
- Sara Castañeda – Philippines women's national team player
- Sheva Imut – Indonesia women's national team player
- Shalika Aurelia – Indonesia women's national team player

== Head coaches ==
- (Philippines) Jayson Cutamora (2025 PFF Women's League)
- (Philippines) Dan Padernal (2025 PFF Women's League)

== Record ==
Main domestic competitions

Season	Teams	League Position	PFF Women's Cup
2025	6	4th	–

== Honors ==
- Gothia Cup:
  - Winners: 1985 (Boys U11), 2024 (Girls U12 and Boys U13), 2025 (Girls U13)
  - Second place: 2023 (Girls U14)
  - Third place: 1986 (Boys U12), 2016 (Boys U12), 2023 (Girls U12)
- JSSL Singapore
  - Winners: 2024 (Boys U6) (Boys U7) (Boys U13) (Girls U14) (Girls U16)
  - Second place: 2024 (Boys U14) (Boys U10)
  - Third place: 2024 (Boys U15) (Girls U10)
- Iber Cup
  - Second place: 2025 (Girls U13)
