= Capital1 Solar Strikers =

- Full name: Capital1 Solar Strikers
- Founded: 2025; 1 year ago
- Owner(s): Milka and Mandy Romero
- Head coach: Let Dimzon
- League: PFF Women's League
- 2025: PFF Women's League, 3rd of 6

The Capital1 Solar Strikers are a Philippine women's football club which plays in the PFF Women's League.

== History ==
The Capital1 Solar Strikers was established in February 2025. It was unveiled in March 2025 at Bonifacio Global City in Taguig as a new football team to join the PFF Women's League. This followed Capital1's entry in the Premier Volleyball League in 2024 through the Solar Spikers. The Solar Strikers is owned by sisters Milka and Mandy Romero and will have former Kaya–Iloilo official Let Dimzon as its head coach. The initial roster is consist of mostly UAAP players. They lost their first ever league match 0–3 against Kaya–Iloilo in March 2025.

== Players ==
As of May 17, 2025

Note: Flags indicate national team as defined under FIFA eligibility rules; some limited exceptions apply. Players may hold more than one non-FIFA nationality.

No.	Pos.	Nation	Player
1	GK	PHI	Yasmin Elauria
2	FW	PHI	Maria Layacan
3	MF	PHI	Tejanee Isulat
4	DF	PHI	Tenelyn Otom
5	MF	PHI	Samantha Toledo
6	DF	PHI	Kristine Dela Peña
7	DF	GHA	Helina Lamptey
8	FW	USA	Arianna Del Moral
9	DF	PHI	Merry Soriano
10	MF	PHI	Hazel Lustan
11	MF	PHI	Elna Bongol
12	FW	PHI	Lyka Teves
13	DF	USA	Emma Young

No.	Pos.	Nation	Player
14	FW	PHI	Judie Arevalo
15	MF	PHI	Regine Rebosura
16	MF	PHI	Arantxa Trebol
17	DF	PHI	Patricia Francisco
18	GK	PHI	Jessa Lehayan
19		PHI	Milet Tuliao
20	MF	PHI	Kyza Colina
21	MF	PHI	Sarahgen Tulabing
23	DF	PHI	Rae Tolentino
24	MF	PHI	Marienell Cristobal
25	MF	PHI	Althea Rebosura
26	DF	PHI	Princess Caparida
—	FW	PHI	Milka Romero

== Record ==
Main domestic competitions

Season	Teams	League Position	PFF Women's Cup
2025	6	3rd	–
