= Orlando Plagata =

Filipino football player and coach

Personal information
- Date of birth: 1933 or 1934
- Date of death: October 24, 2005 (aged 71 or 72)
- Place of death: Bacolod, Philippines

Managerial career
- Years: Team
- 1985: Philippines (women's)
- 1991: Philippines U23
- c. 2004: FEU Booters

Orlando Plagata was a Filipino football coach and player.

He was reportedly "discovered" as a football coach when he was coaching football players of Barotac Nuevo at matches which took place in Negros Occidental.

He along with fellow coach Florentino Broce accomplished a FIFA coaching course under German coach Dettmar Cramer. In 1972, he and Broce was tasked by Johnny Romualdez who was in charge of the national teams of the Philippines to coach the Kasibulan team, which was composed of under-20 footballers.

Plagata guided the Philippines women's national football team at the 1985 Southeast Asian Games which finished third but the women's tournament of the regional games was contested by only three teams.

In 1991, he led the Philippines under-23 football team at the Asian qualifiers for the 1992 Summer Olympics.

In April 2004, Plagata was given one of the Longevity Awards for being involved in football as a player and coach for 55 years by that time. By the same year, he was coaching the men's varsity football team of the Far Eastern University (FEU).

Plagata died on October 24, 2005. He was found dead by FEU officials inside his room at the Belle's Pension House in Bacolod who missed his service during the first game of FEU at the then ongoing University Games. Plagata was diabetic and an autopsy revealed he died due to massive cerebral hemorrhage. His remains was moved to Iloilo City the day after his death to allow relatives to mourn for him and was reportedly to be moved to Manila.
