= Chandler McDaniel =

Filipino footballer (born 1998)

Personal information
- Full name: Chandler Blue Isip McDaniel
- Date of birth: February 4, 1998 (age 28)
- Place of birth: Orange, California, U.S.
- Height: 5 ft 6 in (1.68 m)
- Positions: Forward; midfielder

Team information
- Current team: Atlante
- Number: 9

Youth career
- –2016: Norco High School

College career
Years	Team	Apps	(Gls)
2016–2017	Virginia Tech Hokies	34	(4)
2018–2019	Milwaukee Panthers	37	(2)

Senior career*
Years	Team	Apps	(Gls)
–	FC Golden State		
2023	Stallion Laguna	1	(0)
2023	Pinzgau Saalfelden	4	(1)
2024	Dimas Escazú	14	(1)
2024–2026	Stallion Laguna	9	(11)
2026–	Atlante	9	(0)

International career^{‡}
2021–	Philippines	36	(13)
- * Club domestic league appearances and goals as of October 26, 2026 ‡ National team caps and goals as of March 19, 2026

Chandler Blue Isip McDaniel (born February 4, 1998) is a professional footballer who plays as a forward for Liga MX Femenil side Atlante. Born in the United States, she represents the Philippines at international level.

== Early life ==
McDaniel was born in Orange, California to Lindy, a Filipino who has connections to Pampanga and Davao City, and Clint who works as a football (soccer) coach. She played for the women's team of Norco High School.

== College career ==
In college, McDaniel played for the Virginia Tech Hokies and later with the Milwaukee Panthers. She entered Virginia Polytechnic Institute in 2016 as a freshman, playing for the Hokies until her sophomore year in 2017. She later transferred to University of Wisconsin-Milwaukee making 37 appearances and two goals for the Milwaukee Panthers in her junior and senior years (2018–19).

== Club career ==
=== Stallion Laguna ===
After her stint in the 2023 FIFA Women's World Cup, she and her sister Olivia joined Stallion Laguna of the PFF Women's League. The siblings played only one match for the club; they lost 4–0 to collegiate side De La Salle University in their debut game.

=== Dimas Escazú ===
In January 2024, she signed with Costa Rican club Dimas Escazú after her stint with Austrian club FC Pinzgau Saalfelden. She parted ways with the club in July 2024.

=== Return to Stallion Laguna ===
She and her sister Olivia rejoined Stallion Laguna for the 2024 PFF Women's Cup. Chandler McDaniel scored the winning goal in the final which won Stallion Laguna the title. She remained with the club, as the captain for the 2025 PFF Women's League season.

== International career ==
McDaniel's first cap for the Philippines women's national team was at the 2022 AFC Women's Asian Cup qualifiers in the Philippines' 2–1 win over Nepal on September 18, 2021. McDaniel provided the assist which contributed to the goals of teammates Tahnai Annis and Camille Wilson which overturned the one-goal lead of Nepal in the last minutes of the game. She scored her first goal in the Philippines 2–1 win against Hong Kong on September 24, 2021, which secured her country's qualification for the Asian Cup.

McDaniel was called up to represent the Philippines earlier at the 2018 AFC Women's Asian Cup but was not part of the final squad. She also participated in the Philippine national tryouts for the 2016 AFF Women's Championship. She featured in the 2022 AFC Women's Asian Cup where she helped qualify her team for the 2023 FIFA Women's World Cup but sustained a major injury in the process.

McDaniel would recover from her injury, making her return to the national team in the opening match of the 2024 AFC Women's Olympic qualifiers against Pakistan in April 2023.

== Career statistics ==
=== Club ===
As of August 25, 2025

Appearances and goals by club, season and competition
Club	Season	League			National Cup (Note: Includes Torneo de Copa de Costa Rica, PFF Women's Cup)		Continental (Note: Includes AFC Women's Champions League)		Total	
Club	Season	Division	Apps	Goals	Apps	Goals	Apps	Goals	Apps	Goals
Stallion Laguna	2023	PFF Women's League	1	0	—		—		1	0
Pinzgau Saalfelden	2023–24	2. Frauen Bundesliga	4	1	—		—		4	1
Dimas Escazú	2024	Primera División de Costa Rica	11	0	3	1	—		14	1
Stallion Laguna	2024	PFF Women's League	—		6	8	—		6	8
Stallion Laguna	2025	PFF Women's League	10	8	0	0	3	9	13	17
Stallion Laguna	Total		10	8	6	8	3	9	19	25
Career total			26	9	9	9	3	9	38	27

=== International goals ===
Scores and results list the Philippines' goal tally first.

#	Date	Venue	Opponent	Score	Result	Competition
1.	September 24, 2021	JAR Stadium, Tashkent, Uzbekistan	Hong Kong	2–1	2–1	2022 AFC Women's Asian Cup qualification
2.	January 21, 2022	DY Patil Stadium, Navi Mumbai, India	Thailand	1–0	1–0	2022 AFC Women's Asian Cup
3.	April 5, 2023	Hisor Central Stadium, Hisor, Tajikistan	Pakistan	4–0	4–0	2024 AFC Women's Olympic Qualifying Tournament
4.	April 8, 2023	Hisor Central Stadium, Hisor, Tajikistan	Tajikistan	7–0	8–0	2024 AFC Women's Olympic Qualifying Tournament
5.	April 8, 2023	Hisor Central Stadium, Hisor, Tajikistan	Tajikistan	8–0	8–0	2024 AFC Women's Olympic Qualifying Tournament
6.	October 26, 2023	Perth Rectangular Stadium, Perth, Australia	Chinese Taipei	4–1	4–1	2024 AFC Women's Olympic Qualifying Tournament
7.	April 4, 2025	Theyab Awana Stadium, Dubai, United Arab Emirates	United Arab Emirates	2–0	4–1	Friendly
8.	April 4, 2025	Theyab Awana Stadium, Dubai, United Arab Emirates	United Arab Emirates	4–0	4–1	Friendly
9.	April 8, 2025	Theyab Awana Stadium, Dubai, United Arab Emirates	United Arab Emirates	4–0	4–0	Friendly
10.	July 2, 2025	Olympic Stadium, Phnom Penh, Cambodia	Cambodia	6–0	6–0	2026 AFC Women's Asian Cup qualification
11.	July 5, 2025	Olympic Stadium, Phnom Penh, Cambodia	Hong Kong	1–0	1–0	2026 AFC Women's Asian Cup qualification
12.	October 29, 2025	Rizal Memorial Stadium, Manila, Philippines	Uzbekistan	1–0	2–2	Friendly
13.	March 8, 2026	Gold Coast Stadium, Gold Coast, Australia	Iran	2–0	2–0	2026 AFC Women's Asian Cup

== Personal life ==
Chandler's siblings are also football players. Her older sister Olivia is a goalkeeper for the Philippine women's national team, while her younger brother Griffin plays for the men's national team. Meanwhile, their dad Clint is the assistant coach for Finn's club, Stallion Laguna.

== Honours ==
Stallion Laguna

- PFF Women's Cup: 2024
