= Manila Digger F.C. (women) =

Manila Digger
- Full name: Manila Digger Football Club
- Nickname: The Diggers
- Founded: 2018; 8 years ago
- Ground: Turf BGC, Taguig City
- League: PFF Women's League
- 2023: PFF Women's League, 2nd
Home colours	Away colours	Third colours

Manila Digger Football Club is a Filipino professional women's football club which has played in the PFF Women's League.

== History ==
Manila Digger F.C. was formed in 2018, a group of Chinese migrants in the Philippines led by Sha Shuo. The team was named "digger" to reflect the Chinese founders' aspiration to make a good living in the country.

Originally, a men's club, Manila Digger formed a women's team for 7-a-side football. Among the tournaments that Manila Digger's women team joined tournaments is the AIA 7's Football League,

The Diggers later debuted at the PFF Women's League in the 2023 season. They are close title contenders on their first appearance, reaching the final of the league season which had a knock-out round. Manila Digger then joined the 2024 PFF Women's Cup finishing third.

== Records ==
Season	Teams	League position	PFF Women's Cup
2023	10	3rd (regular season)	N/A (not held)
2023	10	2nd (finals)	N/A (not held)
2024	6	N/A (not held)	3rd

== See also ==
- Manila Digger F.C.
