= Stallion Laguna F.C. (women) =

Stallion Laguna
- Full name: Stallion Laguna Football Club
- Nickname: The Stallions
- Short name: STA
- Founded: 2002; 24 years ago
- Ground: Biñan Football Stadium
- Capacity: 2,580
- Head coach: Clint McDaniel
- League: PFF Women's League
- 2025: PFF Women's League, 2nd of 6
Home colours	Away colours

Stallion Laguna Football Club is a Filipino professional football club which organizes a women's team. The club plays in the PFF Women's League, the women's domestic national league of the Philippines. It has a men's team, which competes in the Philippines Football League.

== History ==
Stallion Laguna's women's team first joined the PFF Women's League during 2019–20, the league's third season. It competed as Stallion–Hiraya, under a partnership with another women's club Hiraya F.C.

It joined the 2022 PFF Women's Cup, as Stallion Laguna. The club would compete under the same name, when the PFF Women's League returned from a three-year hiatus in 2023.

In September 2024, former Philippine women's national team general manager and patron Jefferson Cheng started sponsoring Stallion through his company, Philippine Airport Ground Support Solutions.

== Players ==
As of May 17, 2025

Note: Flags indicate national team as defined under FIFA eligibility rules; some limited exceptions apply. Players may hold more than one non-FIFA nationality.

No.	Pos.	Nation	Player
2	MF	PHI	Kaya Hawkinson
3	DF	PHI	Rachelle Sanchez
4	DF	MYA	Nan Phyu Phwe
5	FW	PHI	Claire Lubetania
6	DF	USA	Kala McDaniel
7	FW	USA	Kaelyn Miller
8	FW	PHI	Chandler McDaniel (captain)
9	FW	PHI	Arantxa Del Mundo
10	MF	USA	Sierra Castles
11	FW	PHI	Yanzie Yalong
12	MF	USA	Mikayla Simons
13	FW	PHI	Alyssa Ube
14	MF	PHI	Isabella Pasion
15	DF	USA	Haley Bostard
16	DF	USA	Megan Janikowski
17	GK	PHI	Janine Mahinay

No.	Pos.	Nation	Player
18	MF	USA	Madison Samilo
19	DF	PHI	Rhea Chan
20	FW	PHI	Annika Gutierrez
21	MF	PHI	Charisa Lemoran
22	DF	GUM	Jenna Merrill
23	GK	PHI	Olivia McDaniel
24	FW	PHI	Malia Cerdon
26	DF	PHI	Valerie Polido
27	DF	PHI	Analou Amita
28	FW	PHI	Maisie Visperas
29	MF	PHI	Pauline San Buenaventura
31	MF	PHI	Pauline Lorque
33		PHI	Danielle Xavier
44	DF	USA	Nia Fountain
49	FW	MYA	San Thaw Thaw

== Honors ==
=== Domestic ===
==== Cups ====
- PFF Women's Cup
  - Winners (1): 2024

== Records ==
Season	Teams	League position	PFF Women's Cup
2019–20	10	5th	N/A (not held)
2022	—	N/A (not held)	8th
2023	10	10th	N/A (not held)
2024	6	N/A (not held)	1st
2025	6	2nd	N/A (canceled)

=== Continental record ===
Season	Competition	Round	Opponent	Score	Result
2025–26	AFC Women's Champions League	Group A	(Mongolia) Khovd Western	6–1	1st out of 4
2025–26	AFC Women's Champions League	Group A	(Guam) Strykers	13–0	1st out of 4
2025–26	AFC Women's Champions League	Group A	(Myanmar) ISPE	1–3	1st out of 4
2025–26	AFC Women's Champions League	Group A	(Vietnam) Hồ Chí Minh City	0–1	3rd out of 4
2025–26	AFC Women's Champions League	Group A	(Australia) Melbourne City	0–7	3rd out of 4
2025–26	AFC Women's Champions League	Group A	(Singapore) Lion City Sailors	5–0	3rd out of 4
2025–26	AFC Women's Champions League	Quarter-finals	(Japan) Tokyo Verdy Beleza	0–5	
