= Vietnam women's national football team results (1997–2019) =

National football team results

This article provides details of international football games played by the Vietnam women's national football team from 1997 to 2019.

== Result ==
Key
Win
Draw
Defeat

=== 1997 ===
11 May Hanoi Women's International Cup	Vietnam	0–1	Malaysia	Hanoi, Vietnam
		Report	Beatrice Yaw 50' (pen.)	Stadium: Hàng Đẫy Stadium

15 May Hanoi Women's International Cup	Vietnam	1–4	Chinese Taipei	Hanoi, Vietnam
				Stadium: Hàng Đẫy Stadium

26 July Toh Puan Datuk Seri Saadiah Sardon Trophy	Vietnam	3–1	Myanmar	Kuala Lumpur, Malaysia
	Phùng Thị Minh Nguyệt 6'; Nguyễn Thị Thúy Nga 32'; Lưu Ngọc Mai 84'	Report	Thida Kyi 39'	Stadium: Jalan Raja Muda Stadium

27 July Toh Puan Datuk Seri Saadiah Sardon Trophy	Vietnam	5–0	Singapore	Kuala Lumpur, Malaysia
	Phùng Thị Minh Nguyệt 27'; Nguyễn Thị Hà 35'; Bùi Thị Hiền Lương 38', 57'; Nguyễn Khoa Diệu Sinh 73'	Report		Stadium: Jalan Raja Muda Stadium

29 July Toh Puan Datuk Seri Saadiah Sardon Trophy	Malaysia	0–1	Vietnam	Kuala Lumpur, Malaysia
		Report	Phùng Thị Minh Nguyệt 54'	Stadium: Merdeka Stadium

30 July Toh Puan Datuk Seri Saadiah Sardon Trophy	Vietnam	3–2	Myanmar	Kuala Lumpur, Malaysia
	Lưu Ngọc Mai 7'; Nguyễn Thị Hà 30'; Nguyễn Thị Thúy Nga 56' (pen.)	Report	Myint Myint Hlang 13'; Hla Hla Than 89'	Stadium: Merdeka Stadium

7 October 1997 SEA Games	Thailand	3–2	Vietnam	Jakarta, Indonesia

11 October 1997 SEA Games	Vietnam	2–0	Philippines	Jakarta, Indonesia

13 October 1997 SEA Games	Myanmar	3–2	Vietnam	Jakarta, Indonesia

15 October 1997 SEA Games	Vietnam	2–0	Indonesia	Jakarta, Indonesia

=== 1998 ===
8 October 1998 Asian Games	Vietnam	0–7	North Korea	Pathum Thani, Thailand
14:00 UTC+7				Stadium: Thupatemi Stadium

10 October 1998 Asian Games	Thailand	1–1	Vietnam	Pathum Thani, Thailand
14:00 UTC+7				Stadium: Thupatemi Stadium

12 October 1998 Asian Games	Vietnam	0–8	Japan	Bangkok, Thailand
14:00 UTC+7			Sawa (?); Isaka (?); Yamashigi (?); Kishi (?); Sugawara (?)	Stadium: Thai-Japanese Stadium

=== 1999 ===
26 October Friendly	Thailand	0–6	Vietnam	Bangkok, Thailand
		Report

9 November 1999 AFC Women's Championship	North Korea	12–1	Vietnam	Iloilo City, Philippines
				Stadium: Iloilo Sports Complex

11 November 1999 AFC Women's Championship	Chinese Taipei	4–1	Vietnam	Iloilo City, Philippines
	Huang Chung-lan 26', 47' (pen.); Lin Chi-i 39', 90'		Lưu Ngọc Mai 3'	Stadium: Iloilo Sports Complex

13 November 1999 AFC Women's Championship	India	0–3	Vietnam	Iloilo City, Philippines
				Stadium: Iloilo Sports Complex

15 November 1999 AFC Women's Championship	Vietnam	4–0	Malaysia	Iloilo City, Philippines
				Stadium: Iloilo Sports Complex

=== 2001 ===
21 May Hybrid friendly	Vietnam	5–1	(Vietnam) Than Quảng Ninh	Hanoi, Vietnam
		Report		Stadium: Hàng Đẫy Stadium

24 May 2001 Hanoi Open Tournament	Vietnam	3–0	(Vietnam) Hà Tây	Hanoi, Vietnam
15:00		Report		Stadium: Hà Nội Stadium

26 May 2001 Hanoi Open Tournament	Vietnam	4–0	(Vietnam) Hà Nội	Hanoi, Vietnam
15:30		Report		Stadium: Hà Nội Stadium

28 May 2001 Hanoi Open Tournament	Thailand	1–5	Vietnam	Hanoi, Vietnam
16:50		Report		Stadium: Hà Nội Stadium

21 July Friendly	Myanmar	3–2	Vietnam	Rangoon, Myanmar
		Report

23 July Friendly	Myanmar	2–1	Vietnam	Rangoon, Myanmar
		Report

5 August 2001 Central Coast Women's Tournament	NSWIS (Australia)	2–0	Vietnam	Gosford, Australia
		Report		Stadium: North Power Stadium

7 August 2001 Central Coast Women's Tournament	Vietnam	6–0	Singapore	Lisarow, Australia
	Nguyễn Thị Hà 1', 34'; Phùng Thị Minh Nguyệt 12'; Nguyễn Thị Phương 24'; Lưu Ngọc Mai 31'; Đoàn Thị Kim Chi 85'	Report		Stadium: Pluim Park

9 August 2001 Central Coast Women's Tournament	Australia U-19	2–0	Vietnam	Gosford, Australia
		Report		Stadium: North Power Stadium

11 August 2001 Central Coast Women's Tournament	Vietnam	4–0	Singapore	Gosford, Australia
	Phùng Thị Minh Nguyệt 21'; Nguyễn Thị Hà 37', 58'; Lưu Ngọc Mai 82'	Report		Stadium: North Power Stadium

5 September 2001 SEA Games	Vietnam	6–0	Indonesia	Petaling Jaya, Malaysia
	Đoàn Thị Kim Chi 2'; Nguyễn Thị Mai Lan 20'; Lưu Ngọc Mai 40', 75', 83'; Bùi Thị Hiền Lương 72'

7 September 2001 SEA Games	Vietnam	5–0	Singapore	Petaling Jaya, Malaysia
	Nguyễn Thị Mai Lan 9'; Gan Hwee Fern 12' (o.g.); Lưu Ngọc Mai 41', 77'; Nguyễn Thị Hà 89'

12 September 2001 SEA Games	Vietnam	1–1 (a.e.t.) (6–5 p)	Myanmar	Petaling Jaya, Malaysia
	Lưu Ngọc Mai 36'		Moe Moe War 90' (pen.)

15 September 2001 SEA Games	Vietnam	4–0	Thailand	Petaling Jaya, Malaysia
19:45 UTC+8	Bùi Thị Hiền Lương 9', 53'; Nguyễn Thị Thúy Nga 30' (pen.); Lưu Ngọc Mai 49' (pen.)

6 December 2001 AFC Women's Championship	Vietnam	2–0	Guam	New Taipei City, Taiwan
	Đoàn Thị Kim Chi 13', 52'

8 December 2001 AFC Women's Championship	North Korea	4–0	Vietnam	New Taipei City, Taiwan

10 December 2001 AFC Women's Championship	Vietnam	8–0	Singapore	New Taipei City, Taiwan

12 December 2001 AFC Women's Championship	Japan	3–1	Vietnam	New Taipei City, Taiwan

=== 2002 ===
20 September Hybrid friendly	Shanghai Youth (China)	1–4	Vietnam	Shanghai, China
		Report

25 September Hybrid friendly	Shanghai Youth (China)	0–4	Vietnam	Shanghai, China
		Report

2 October 2002 Asian Games	South Korea	4–0	Vietnam	Changwon, South Korea
	Hwang In-sun 17'; Kwak Mi-hee 31'; Lee ji-eun 43'; Cha Sung-mi 55'			Stadium: Changwon Stadium

4 October 2002 Asian Games	Japan	3–0	Vietnam	Changwon, South Korea
	Otani 23', 43'; Sawa 89'			Stadium: Changwon Stadium

7 October 2002 Asian Games	China	4–1	Vietnam	Busan, South Korea
	Ren Liping 3', 46'; Gao Hongxia 16'; Bai Jie 53'		Quách Thanh Mai 19'	Stadium: Gudeok Stadium

9 October 2002 Asian Games	Chinese Taipei	1–1	Vietnam	Yangsan, South Korea
	Chen Shu-chiung 88'		Đoàn Thị Kim Chi 70'	Stadium: Yangsan Stadium

11 October 2002 Asian Games	Vietnam	0–4	North Korea	Changwon, South Korea
			Jin Pyol-hui 17', 43'; Ri Kum-suk 65'; Yun Yong-hui 74'	Stadium: Changwon Stadium

=== 2003 ===
9 June 2003 AFC Women's Championship	China	6–0	Vietnam	Nakhon Sawan, Thailand
16:00 UTC+7	Teng Wei 3', 29'; Sun Wen 8'; Liu Ying 55', 63'; Han Duan 75'			Stadium: Nakhon Sawan Province Stadium

11 June 2003 AFC Women's Championship	Vietnam	4–2	Uzbekistan	Nakhon Sawan, Thailand
16:00 UTC+7	Lưu Ngọc Mai 19', 24', 37', 77'		Kosimova 57'; Abdurasulova 85'	Stadium: Nakhon Sawan Province Stadium

13 June 2003 AFC Women's Championship	Vietnam	2–1	India	Nakhon Sawan, Thailand
16:00 UTC+7	Lưu Ngọc Mai 9'; Đoàn Thị Kim Chi 55'			Stadium: Nakhon Sawan Province Stadium

20 September Vietnam Coal Tournament	Vietnam	2–0	Malaysia	Quảng Ninh, Vietnam
		Report		Stadium: Cửa Ông Stadium

22 September Vietnam Coal Tournament	Vietnam	3–1	(Vietnam) Than Cửa Ông	Quảng Ninh, Vietnam
		Report		Stadium: Cửa Ông Stadium

26 September Vietnam Coal Tournament	Vietnam	3–0	Thailand	Quảng Ninh, Vietnam
		Report		Stadium: Cửa Ông Stadium

2 December 2003 SEA Games	Vietnam	6–0	Indonesia	Hải Phòng, Vietnam
	Lưu Ngọc Mai 10', 11', 33', 43'; Phùng Thị Nguyệt 18'; Văn Thị Thanh 23'			Stadium: Lạch Tray Stadium

4 December 2003 SEA Games	Malaysia	1–3	Vietnam	Hải Phòng, Vietnam
	Ngah 77'		Văn Thị Thanh 55'; Đoàn Thị Kim Chi 59'; Nguyễn Thị Mai Lan 65'	Stadium: Lạch Tray Stadium

6 December 2003 SEA Games	Vietnam	3–0	Philippines	Hải Phòng, Vietnam
	Nguyễn Thị Hà 1'; Phạm Quỳnh Anh 25'; Đỗ Thị Phượng 53'			Stadium: Lạch Tray Stadium

8 December 2003 SEA Games	Vietnam	3–1	Thailand	Hải Phòng, Vietnam
	Lưu Ngọc Mai 6'; Phùng Minh Nguyệt 36'; Saipin 49' (o.g.)		Piamsin 63'	Stadium: Lạch Tray Stadium

11 December 2003 SEA Games	Vietnam	2–1	Myanmar	Hải Phòng, Vietnam
	Văn Thị Thanh 56'; Nguyễn Thị Mai Lan 85'		My Nilar Htwe 69'	Stadium: Lạch Tray Stadium

=== 2004 ===
18 April 2004 Summer Olympics qualification	Japan	7–0	Vietnam	Tokyo, Japan
	Miyamoto 3', 41'; Otani 7', 59'; Maruyama 60'; Yamamoto 85'; Sawa 90'			Stadium: Komazawa Olympic Park Stadium

20 April 2004 Summer Olympics qualification	Vietnam	0–0	Thailand	Tokyo, Japan
				Stadium: Komazawa Olympic Park Stadium

30 September 2004 AFF Women's Championship	Vietnam	6–0	Singapore	Hồ Chí Minh City, Vietnam
	Đoàn Thị Kim Chi 34'; Trần Thị Kim Hồng 40'; Bùi Thị Tuyết Mai 58'; Văn Thị Thanh 65' (pen.), 72'; Vũ Thị Lành 80'			Stadium: Thành Long Sports Complex

2 October 2004 AFF Women's Championship	Vietnam	1–0	Indonesia	Hồ Chí Minh City, Vietnam
	Vũ Thị Lành 41'			Stadium: Thành Long Sports Complex

3 October 2004 AFF Women's Championship	Vietnam	14–0	Maldives	Hồ Chí Minh City, Vietnam
	Vũ Thị Ánh 4'; Nguyễn Thị Diệu Huyền 19', 30', 35', 38', 46', 61'; Võ Thị Thu Hà 29', 39'; Nguyễn Thị Hiền 58', 67'; Lê Thị Oanh 70', 80', 85'			Stadium: Thành Long Sports Complex

4 October 2004 AFF Women's Championship	Vietnam	5–0	Philippines	Hồ Chí Minh City, Vietnam
	Đỗ Hồng Tiến 17', 89'; Văn Thị Thanh 20'; Đoàn Thị Kim Chi 25'; Lưu Ngọc Mai (?)			Stadium: Thành Long Sports Complex

5 October 2004 AFF Women's Championship	Vietnam	1–1	Myanmar	Hồ Chí Minh City, Vietnam
	Lê Thị Hiền 20'		Nalar Win 43'	Stadium: Thành Long Sports Complex

7 October 2004 AFF Women's Championship	Vietnam	4–1	Indonesia	Hồ Chí Minh City, Vietnam
	Lê Thị Hiền 10', 55', 81'; Từ Thị Phụ 83'		Tugiyati 30'	Stadium: Thành Long Sports Complex

9 October 2004 AFF Women's Championship	Vietnam	2–2 (a.e.t.) (2–4 p)	Myanmar	Hồ Chí Minh City, Vietnam
	Văn Thị Thanh 7'; Bùi Thị Tuyết Mai 110'		Malar Win 24'; Thet Thet Win 115'	Stadium: Thành Long Sports Complex
	Penalties
	Nguyen Thi (penalty scored); Văn Thị Thanh (penalty scored) ? (penalty missed) ? (penalty missed)		(penalty scored) Aye Nander; (penalty scored) Moe Moe War; (penalty scored) Thet Thet Win; (penalty scored) San San Waw

15 November Vietnam Coal Tournament	Than Cửa Ông (Vietnam)	0–4	Vietnam	Quảng Ninh, Vietnam
		Report		Stadium: Cẩm Phả Stadium

13 November Vietnam Coal Tournament	Vietnam	3–0	Hong Kong	Quảng Ninh, Vietnam
	Đỗ Hồng Tiến 25'; Đoàn Thị Kim Chi 34'; Văn Thị Thanh (?)	Report		Stadium: Cẩm Phả Stadium

19 November Vietnam Coal Tournament	Vietnam	1–0	(Chinese Taipei) Hsing Wu College	Quảng Ninh, Vietnam
	Từ Thị Phụ 83'	Report		Stadium: Cẩm Phả Stadium

=== 2005 ===
7 May Hybrid friendly	Vietnam	2–0	(Vietnam) Than Cửa Ông	Hanoi, Vietnam
	Đỗ Thị Ngọc Châm 60'; Lê Thị Oanh 80'	Report		Stadium: Hanoi National Sports Training Center

18 May Hybrid friendly	Ming Chuan University (Chinese Taipei)	1–5	Vietnam	Taipei, Taiwan
17:00 UTC+8	5'	Report	Nguyễn Thị Hương 15'; Lê Thị Oanh 18', 45', 65'; Đỗ Thị Ngọc Châm 58'	Stadium: Ming Chuan University Stadium

22 May Hybrid friendly	SanChong High School (Chinese Taipei)	0–1	Vietnam	Taipei, Taiwan
17:00 UTC+8		Report	Đoàn Thị Kim Chi 79'	Stadium: Sanchong Stadium

24 May Hybrid friendly	Taiwan Sport University (Chinese Taipei)	0–1	Vietnam	Taipei, Taiwan
16:00 UTC+8		Report	Đoàn Thị Kim Chi 90'	Stadium: National Taiwan University Sports Center

26 May Hybrid friendly	Chengchi University (Chinese Taipei)	0–2	Vietnam	Taipei, Taiwan
10:00 UTC+8		Report	Đỗ Thị Ngọc Châm 5'; Lê Thị Oanh 30'	Stadium: National Chengchi University Stadium

29 May Hybrid friendly	Hsing Wu College (Chinese Taipei)	1–1	Vietnam	Taipei, Taiwan
10:00 UTC+8	Từ Thị Phụ 66' (o.g.)	Report	Văn Thị Thanh 3'

12 June 2006 AFC Women's Asian Cup qualification	Vietnam	6–1	Philippines	Hanoi, Vietnam
	Bùi Thị Tuyết Mai 8'; Đỗ Hồng Tiến 31', 38'; Đoàn Thị Kim Chi 56', 57', 71'		Impelido 70'	Stadium: Mỹ Đình National Stadium

14 June 2006 AFC Women's Asian Cup qualification	Vietnam	1–0	Myanmar	Hanoi, Vietnam
	Đoàn Thị Kim Chi 44' (pen.)			Stadium: Mỹ Đình National Stadium

19 June 2006 AFC Women's Asian Cup qualification	Vietnam	4–1	Hong Kong	Hanoi, Vietnam
	Đoàn Thị Kim Chi 40'; Lê Thị Hiền 45+2'; Đỗ Thị Ngọc Châm 55'; Bùi Thị Tuyết Mai 90'		Lau Ka Wai 83'	Stadium: Mỹ Đình National Stadium

4 October Vietnam Coal Tournament	Than Cửa Ông (Vietnam)	1–0	Vietnam	Quảng Ninh, Vietnam
https://www.rsssf.org/tablesw/wom-vietcoal05.html		Report		Stadium: Cẩm Phả Stadium

7 October Vietnam Coal Tournament	Vietnam	2–1	India	Quảng Ninh, Vietnam
15:00 UTC+7	Văn Thị Thanh 3', 70' (pen.)	Report	Oinam Bembem Devi 49' (pen.)	Stadium: Cẩm Phả Stadium

10 October Vietnam Coal Tournament	Vietnam	2–0	Chinese Taipei	Quảng Ninh, Vietnam
15:00 UTC+7	Văn Thị Thanh 36' (pen.); Lê Thị Oanh 49'	Report		Stadium: Cẩm Phả Stadium

4 November Friendly	Chinese Taipei B	0–2	Vietnam	Taipei, Iaiwan
		Report	Bùi Tuyết Mai 58'; Nguyễn Thị Minh Nguyệt 89'

7 November Hybrid friendly	Taipei PE College (Chinese Taipei)	0–0	Vietnam	Taipei, Taiwan
		Report

9 November Hybrid friendly	Hsing Wu College (Chinese Taipei)	1–1	Vietnam	Taipei, Taiwan
	85'	Report	Bùi Tuyết Mai 17'

22 November 2005 SEA Games	Myanmar	1–0	Vietnam	Marikina, Philippines
18:30 UTC+8	San San Kyu 58'			Stadium: Marikina Sports Complex

26 November 2005 SEA Games	Thailand	0–1	Vietnam	Marikina, Philippines
16:00 UTC+8			Đỗ Hồng Tiến 20'	Stadium: Marikina Sports Complex

28 November 2005 SEA Games	Vietnam	5–1	Philippines	Marikina, Philippines
18:30 UTC+8	Lê Thị Oanh 4', 13', 35', 65'; Văn Thị Thanh 90'		Luto 31'	Stadium: Marikina Sports Complex

30 November 2005 SEA Games	Vietnam	8–0	Indonesia	Marikina, Philippines
18:30 UTC+8	Văn Thị Thanh 2', 26'; Đỗ Hồng Tiến 13'; Bùi Thị Tuyết 45'; Bùi Thị Tuyết Mai 57', 87'; Nguyễn Thị Hương 58'; Trần Thị Hồng Nga 69'			Stadium: Marikina Sports Complex

3 December 2005 SEA Games	Myanmar	0–1	Vietnam	Marikina, Philippines
18:30 UTC+8			Văn Thị Thanh 69'	Stadium: Marikina Sports Complex

27 December Hybrid friendly	Vietnam	1–1	(Vietnam) Hà Nam	Hanoi, Vietnam
		Report		Stadium: Hanoi National Sports Training Center

30 December Friendly	Thailand	1–0	Vietnam	Phuket, Thailand
16:00 UTC+7	24'

=== 2006 ===
29 May 2006 AFF Women's Championship	Vietnam	1–0	Chinese Taipei	Hồ Chí Minh City, Vietnam
16:00 UTC+7	Đỗ Hải Anh (?)			Stadium: Thành Long Sports Complex

31 May 2006 AFF Women's Championship	Thailand	2–3	Vietnam	Hồ Chí Minh City, Vietnam
16:00 UTC+7	(?); (?)		Lê Hoài Thu (?); (?); (?)	Stadium: Thành Long Sports Complex

2 June 2006 AFF Women's Championship	Vietnam	1–0	Myanmar	Hồ Chí Minh City, Vietnam
18:00 UTC+7	Nguyễn Thị Hương 79'			Stadium: Thành Long Sports Complex

19 July 2006 AFC Women's Asian Cup	Japan	5–0	Vietnam	Adelaide, Australia
14:30 UTC+9:30	Sawa 39', 52'; Sakaguchi 65', 78'; Nagasato 81'			Stadium: Hindmarsh Stadium

21 July 2006 AFC Women's Asian Cup	Vietnam	0–2	China	Adelaide, Australia
19:00 UTC+9:30			Ma Xiaoxu 20', 58'	Stadium: Hindmarsh Stadium

23 July 2006 AFC Women's Asian Cup	Chinese Taipei	0–1	Vietnam	Adelaide, Australia
14:30 UTC+9:30			Vũ Thị Huyền Linh 70'	Stadium: Marden Sports Complex

11 November Friendly	China	4–1	Vietnam	Hangzhou, China
14:30 UTC+8	Han Duan 10', 25'; Bi Yan 35'; Ren Liping 80'		70'	Stadium: Hangzhou Greentown Football Base

12 November Friendly	China	2–0	Vietnam	Hangzhou, China
14:30 UTC+8	2' (pen.); 74' (pen.)			Stadium: Hangzhou Greentown Football Base

30 November 2006 Asian Games	North Korea	5–0	Vietnam	Doha, Qatar
19:45 UTC+3	Kil Son-hui 5', 45'; Ri Un-gyong 17'; Kim Kyong-hwa 22'; Ri Kum-suk 27'			Stadium: Qatar SC Stadium

4 December 2006 Asian Games	Vietnam	1–3	South Korea	Al-Rayyan, Qatar
17:15 UTC+3	Bùi Thị Tuyết Mai 79'		Kim Jin-hee 2'; Park Hee-young 6'; Kim Joo-hee 60'	Stadium: Al-Rayyan Stadium

7 December 2006 Asian Games	Chinese Taipei	3–1	Vietnam	Doha, Qatar
17:15 UTC+3	Tsai Li-chen 6', 41'; Lee Hsueh-hua 90+3'		Bùi Thị Tuyết Mai 19'	Stadium: Al-Arabi Stadium

=== 2007 ===
21 February 2008 Summer Olympics qualification	Thailand	1–0	Vietnam	Bangkok, Thailand
	85'			Stadium: Thai-Japanese Stadium

23 February 2008 Summer Olympics qualification	Vietnam	5–0	Maldives	Bangkok, Thailand
	Văn Thị Thanh 16' (pen.); Bùi Thị Tuyết Mai 19', 33', 58'; Nguyễn Thị Minh Nguyệt 50'			Stadium: Thai-Japanese Stadium

25 February 2008 Summer Olympics qualification	Vietnam	3–0	Singapore	Bangkok, Thailand
	Bùi Thị Tuyết Mai 18', 22', 72'			Stadium: Thai-Japanese Stadium

7 April 2008 Summer Olympics qualification	Japan	2–0	Vietnam	Tokyo, Japan
	Sawa 36'; Sakai 73'			Stadium: Japan National Stadium

15 April 2008 Summer Olympics qualification	Vietnam	1–2	South Korea	Hải Phòng, Vietnam
	Đoàn Thị Kim Chi 25'		Ji So-yun 55', 59'	Stadium: Lạch Tray Stadium

3 June 2008 Summer Olympics qualification	Vietnam	1–0	Thailand	Hải Phòng, Vietnam
	Nhiêu Thùy Linh 41'			Stadium: Lạch Tray Stadium

10 June 2008 Summer Olympics qualification	Thailand	5–0	Vietnam	Bangkok, Thailand
				Stadium: Rajamangala Stadium

4 August 2008 Summer Olympics qualification	Vietnam	0–8	Japan	Hải Phòng, Vietnam
			Sakai 10'; Iwashimizu 17'; Ohno 36', 60'; Miyama 39'; Miyamoto 70'; Sawa 72'; Nagasato 80'	Stadium: Lạch Tray Stadium

12 August 2008 Summer Olympics qualification	South Korea	2–1	Vietnam	Cheongju, South Korea
	Ji So-yun 14'; 39'		Đỗ Thị Ngọc Châm 32'	Stadium: Cheongju Stadium

23 August Friendly	China	6–0	Vietnam	Shanghai, China
	Han Duan 19', 52', 55', 58'; Pan Lina 49'; Li Dongna 85'			Stadium: Hongkou Football Stadium

26 August Hybrid friendly	Jiangsu (China)	3–2	Vietnam	Jiangsu, China
16:00 UTC+8		Report		Stadium: Wutaishan Stadium

29 August Hybrid friendly	Shanghai (China)	3–2	Vietnam	Shanghai, China
19:30 UTC+8		Report

7 September 2007 AFF Women's Championship	Vietnam	9–0	Philippines	Yangon, Myanmar
17:45 UTC+6:30	Đoàn Thị Kim Chi 3' (pen.); Văn Thị Thanh 6'; Bùi Thị Tuyết Mai (?); Đỗ Thị Ngọc Châm (?); Lê Thị Thương (?); Lê Thị Hồng Nga (?)			Stadium: Thuwunna Stadium

9 September 2007 AFF Women's Championship	Vietnam	9–0	Malaysia	Yangon, Myanmar
17:45 UTC+6:30	Đoàn Thị Kim Chi 8', 25'; Đỗ Thị Ngọc Châm 26', 33', 34' (?); Nguyễn Thị Kim Tiến 58'; Lê Thị Hồng Nga 80'			Stadium: Thuwunna Stadium

11 September 2007 AFF Women's Championship	Indonesia	0–8	Vietnam	Yangon, Myanmar
			Bùi Thị Tuyết Mai 31', 40'; Doris 35' (o.g.); ? 37' (o.g.); Lê Thị Hồng Nga 45', 46', 65'; ? 80' (o.g.)	Stadium: Thuwunna Stadium

13 September 2007 AFF Women's Championship	Vietnam	0–3	Thailand	Yangon, Myanmar
15:30 UTC+6:30			Sunisa 2'; Nisa (?); 75'	Stadium: Thuwunna Stadium

15 September 2007 AFF Women's Championship	Malaysia	0–6	Vietnam	Yangon, Myanmar
15:00 UTC+6:30			Đỗ Thị Ngọc Châm 8'; Nguyễn Thị Kim Tiến 21'; Lê Thị Hồng Nga 26'; Đào Thị Miện 71'; Trần Thị Kim Hồng 76'; Bùi Thị Tuyết Mai 79'	Stadium: Thuwunna Stadium

16 October Hybrid friendly	Vietnam	2–1	(Vietnam) Hà Tây	Hanoi, Vietnam
		Report		Stadium: Hanoi National Sports Training Center

26 October KTV-Báo Thể Thao Vietnam Tournament	Than KSVN (Vietnam)	0–0	Vietnam	Quảng Ninh, Vietnam
--:-- UTC+7				Stadium: Cẩm Phả Stadium

28 October KTV-Báo Thể Thao Vietnam Tournament	Vietnam	0–2	(China) Shandong	Quảng Ninh, Vietnam
--:-- UTC+7				Stadium: Cẩm Phả Stadium

30 October KTV-Báo Thể Thao Vietnam Tournament	Vietnam	6–0	Chinese Taipei	Quảng Ninh, Vietnam
14:30 UTC+7	Nguyễn Thị Mai Lan (?); Bùi Thị Tuyết Mai (?); Văn Thị Thanh (?); Nguyễn Thị Hương (?)	Report		Stadium: Cẩm Phả Stadium

3 November KTV-Báo Thể Thao Vietnam Tournament	Vietnam	10–0	Laos	Quảng Ninh, Vietnam
14:30 UTC+7	Văn Thị Thanh 10'; Đỗ Thị Ngọc Châm (?); Bùi Thị Tuyết Mai (?); Nhiêu Thùy Linh (?); Trần Thị Kim Hồng (?); Nguyễn Thị Minh Nguyệt (?); (?); (?)	Report		Stadium: Cẩm Phả Stadium

5 November KTV-Báo Thể Thao Vietnam Tournament	Shandong (China)	0–0 (3–4 p)	Vietnam	Quảng Ninh, Vietnam
--:-- UTC+7		Report		Stadium: Cửa Ông Stadium

5 December 2007 SEA Games	Philippines	0–10	Vietnam	Nakhon Ratchasima, Thailand
			Đỗ Thị Ngọc Châm 19', 33', 39', 44'; Đoàn Thị Kim Chi 23', 36'; Trần Thị Kim Hồng 53'; Nguyễn Thị Minh Nguyệt 61', 76'; Bùi Thị Tuyết Mai 78'	Stadium: Municipality of Tumbon Mueangpug Stadium

8 December 2007 SEA Games	Vietnam	4–1	Laos	Nakhon Ratchasima, Thailand
	Bùi Thị Tuyết Mai 2'; Inthasvong 45' (o.g.); Vũ Thị Huyền Linh 62'; Nguyễn Thị Minh Nguyệt 74'		Sayavanh 64'	Stadium: Municipality of Tumbon Mueangpug Stadium

10 December 2007 SEA Games	Vietnam	2–1 (a.e.t.)	Myanmar	Nakhon Ratchasima, Thailand
	Đoàn Thị Kim Chi 49'; Nguyễn Thị Minh Nguyệt 101'		San Yu Naing 41'	Stadium: Municipality of Tumbon Mueangpug Stadium

13 December 2007 SEA Games	Thailand	2–0	Vietnam	Nakhon Ratchasima, Thailand
	Pitsamai 61'; Anootsara 71' (pen.)			Stadium: Municipality of Tumbon Mueangpug Stadium

=== 2008 ===
26 February Hybrid friendly	China U-19	2–1	Vietnam	Kunming, China
		Report	Văn Thị Thanh 20'

24 March 2008 AFC Women's Asian Cup qualification	Vietnam	4–1	Iran	Hồ Chí Minh City, Vietnam
	Văn Thị Thanh 20'; Đỗ Thị Ngọc Châm 21', 55'; Bùi Thị Phượng 86'		Hashemi 82'	Stadium: Thành Long Sports Complex

26 March 2008 AFC Women's Asian Cup qualification	Chinese Taipei	1–3	Vietnam	Hồ Chí Minh City, Vietnam
	Kou Tzu-hui 9'		Đỗ Thị Ngọc Châm 6', 22'; Đoàn Thị Kim Chi 51'	Stadium: Thành Long Sports Complex

28 March 2008 AFC Women's Asian Cup qualification	Myanmar	0–1	Vietnam	Hồ Chí Minh City, Vietnam
			Đỗ Thị Ngọc Châm 65'	Stadium: Thành Long Sports Complex

28 May 2008 AFC Women's Asian Cup	China	1–0	Vietnam	Hồ Chí Minh City, Vietnam
	Xu Yuan 31'			Stadium: Thống Nhất Stadium

30 May 2008 AFC Women's Asian Cup	Vietnam	0–3	North Korea	Hồ Chí Minh City, Vietnam
			Ri Un-gyong 11' (pen.); Ri Kum-suk 39', 67'	Stadium: Thống Nhất Stadium

1 June 2008 AFC Women's Asian Cup	Vietnam	1–0	Thailand	Hồ Chí Minh City, Vietnam
	Đoàn Thị Kim Chi 70'			Stadium: Thống Nhất Stadium

8 October 2008 AFF Women's Championship	Myanmar	1–3	Vietnam	Hồ Chí Minh City, Vietnam
15:30 UTC+7	Aye Nandar Hlaing 70'		Đỗ Thị Ngọc Châm 19', 64'; Nguyễn Thị Nga 87'	Stadium: Thành Long Sports Complex

10 October 2008 AFF Women's Championship	Vietnam	4–0	Indonesia	Hồ Chí Minh City, Vietnam
15:30 UTC+7	Từ Thị Phụ 4'; Nguyễn Thị Minh Nguyệt 32'; Vũ Thị Huyền Linh 42'; Bùi Thị Tuyết Mai 48'			Stadium: Thành Long Sports Complex

12 October 2008 AFF Women's Championship	Malaysia	0–11	Vietnam	Hồ Chí Minh City, Vietnam
18:00 UTC+7			Đỗ Thị Ngọc Châm 13', 76'; Bùi Thị Tuyết Mai 36', 40', 70', 82'; Rozeine 38' (o.g.); Văn Thị Thanh 43'; Lê Thị Thương 58', 67'; Nguyễn Thị Minh Nguyệt 89'	Stadium: Thành Long Sports Complex

16 October 2008 AFF Women's Championship	Laos	0–6	Vietnam	Hồ Chí Minh City, Vietnam
18:00 UTC+7			Lê Thị Oanh 17', 20', 50'; Đỗ Thị Ngọc Châm 30'; Lê Thị Thương 40'; Trần Thị Kim Hồng 70'	Stadium: Thành Long Sports Complex

18 October 2008 AFF Women's Championship	Vietnam	2–1	Thailand	Hồ Chí Minh City, Vietnam
15:00 UTC+7	Trần Thị Kim Hồng 8' (pen.), 50' (pen.)		Nisa 52'	Stadium: Thành Long Sports Complex

20 October 2008 AFF Women's Championship	Vietnam	0–1	Australia	Hồ Chí Minh City, Vietnam
18:00 UTC+7			Đào Thị Miện 79' (o.g.)	Stadium: Thành Long Sports Complex

=== 2009 ===
28 June Friendly	Vietnam	4–0	Uzbekistan	Hồ Chí Minh City, Vietnam
15:30 UTC+7	Đoàn Thị Kim Chi 3'; Đỗ Thị Ngọc Châm 20', 33'; Lê Thị Oanh (?)			Stadium: Thành Long Sports Complex

4 July 2010 AFC Women's Asian Cup qualification	Kyrgyzstan	1–10	Vietnam	Hồ Chí Minh City, Vietnam
15:30 UTC+7	Pokachalova 78' (pen.)		Đoàn Thị Kim Chi 10'; Đỗ Thị Ngọc Châm 21', 24', 57', 62', 72', 87'; Nguyễn Thị Nga 28'; Nguyễn Thị Minh Nguyệt 59'; Lê Thị Oanh 83'	Stadium: Thành Long Sports Complex

8 July 2010 AFC Women's Asian Cup qualification	Vietnam	7–0	Hong Kong	Hồ Chí Minh City, Vietnam
15:30 UTC+7	Văn Thị Thanh 9', 23'; Đỗ Thị Ngọc Châm 11', 39', 70'; Đoàn Thị Kim Chi 56'; Nguyễn Thị Muôn 80'			Stadium: Thành Long Sports Complex

17 October KTV Tournament	Vietnam	5–0	Laos	Quảng Ninh, Vietnam
	Nguyễn Thị Muôn 10'; Đoàn Thị Kim Chi 18'; Văn Thị Thanh 48'; Đỗ Thị Ngọc Châm 70', 75'	Report		Stadium: Cẩm Phả Stadium

19 October KTV Tournament	Than KSVN (Vietnam)	1–3	Vietnam	Quảng Ninh, Vietnam
--:-- UTC+7	Vũ Thị Lành 56'	Report	Lê Thị Thương 35'; Đoàn Thị Kim Chi 36', 84'	Stadium: Cẩm Phả Stadium

23 October KTV Tournament	Vietnam	2–0	Thailand	Quảng Ninh, Vietnam
15:00 UTC+7	Đỗ Thị Ngọc Châm 24', 77'	Report		Stadium: Cẩm Phả Stadium

10 November Hybrid friendly	TEPCO Mareeze (Japan)	2–1	Vietnam	Fukushima, Japan
--:-- UTC+9		Report	Nguyễn Thị Minh Nguyệt 53'	Stadium: J-Village Stadium

12 November Hybrid friendly	Japan U-19	5–0	Vietnam	Fukushima, Japan
--:-- UTC+9		Report		Stadium: J-Village Stadium

14 November Hybrid friendly	AC Fukushima (Japan)	0–2	Vietnam	Fukushima, Japan
--:-- UTC+9		Report	Nguyễn Thị Minh Nguyệt 29'; Đoàn Thị Kim Chi 80'	Stadium: J-Village Stadium

6 December 2009 SEA Games	Malaysia	0–8	Vietnam	Vientiane, Laos
15:45 UTC+7			Đoàn Thị Kim Chi 17', 85'; Nguyễn Thị Muôn 21', 68'; Trần Thị Kim Hồng 29'; Nguyễn Thị Minh Nguyệt 51', 63'; Văn Thị Thanh 73'	Stadium: National University of Laos Stadium

8 December 2009 SEA Games	Myanmar	1–1	Vietnam	Vientiane, Laos
13:30 UTC+7	Moe Moe War 76'		Đoàn Thị Kim Chi 55'	Stadium: National University of Laos Stadium

11 December 2009 SEA Games	Vietnam	2–2	Thailand	Vientiane, Laos
15:45 UTC+7	Nguyễn Thị Muôn 4'; Văn Thị Thanh 32'		Nguyễn Thị Ngọc Anh 41' (o.g.); Sukunya 88'	Stadium: National University of Laos Stadium

13 December 2009 SEA Games	Vietnam	3–0	Laos	Vientiane, Laos
15:45 UTC+7	Trần Thị Kim Hồng 14', 73'; Đoàn Thị Kim Chi 82'			Stadium: Chao Anouvong Stadium

16 December 2009 SEA Games	Thailand	0–0 (a.e.t.) (0–3 p)	Vietnam	Vientiane, Laos
13:30 UTC+7				Stadium: Laos National Stadium
	Penalties
	Supaporn (penalty missed); Naphat (penalty missed); Nisa (penalty missed)		(penalty scored) Trần Thị Kim Hồng; (penalty scored) Văn Thị Thanh; (penalty scored) Nguyễn Thị Kim Tiến

=== 2010 ===
11 May Hybrid friendly	Chengdu Rongcheng (China)	0–3	Vietnam	Chengdu, China
16:30 UTC+8		Report	Nguyễn Thị Muôn 8'; Nguyễn Thị Nguyệt 38'; Lê Thị Oanh 88'	Stadium: Chengdu Sports Centre

14 May Hybrid friendly	Sichuan (China)	0–0	Vietnam	Chengdu, China
16:30 UTC+8		Report		Stadium: Chengdu Sports Centre

19 May 2010 AFC Women's Asian Cup	Australia	2–0	Vietnam	Chengdu, China
15:00 UTC+8	Khamis 29'; Ledbrook 51' (pen.)			Stadium: Chengdu Sports Centre

21 May 2010 AFC Women's Asian Cup	Vietnam	0–5	China	Chengdu, China
19:30 UTC+8			Li Danyang 8'; Yuan Fan 12'; Zhang Rui 37'; Bi Yan 45+1' (pen.); Han Duan 51'	Stadium: Chengdu Sports Centre

23 May 2010 AFC Women's Asian Cup	Vietnam	0–5	South Korea	Chengdu, China
16:00 UTC+8			Yoo Young-a 20', 21', 66'; Cha Yun-hee 28'; Jung Seol-bin 36'	Stadium: Shuangliu Sports Centre

6 November Hybrid friendly	Guangzhou U-19 (China)	0–1	Vietnam	Guangzhou, China
--:-- UTC+8		Report	Nguyễn Thị Ngọc Anh 57'	Stadium: Tianhe Sports Centre

9 November Hybrid friendly	Guangzhou U-19 (China)	0–3	Vietnam	Guangzhou, China
--:-- UTC+8		Report	Nguyễn Thị Hòa 9', 60'; Trần Thị Kim Hồng 40'	Stadium: Tianhe Sports Centre

11 November 2010 Asian Games	South Korea	6–1	Vietnam	Guangzhou, China
16:00 UTC+8	Ji So-yun 7'; Park Hee-young 14', 72' (pen.); Nhiêu Thùy Linh 27' (o.g.); Kwon Hah-nul 72', 77'		Nguyễn Thị Muôn 1'	Stadium: University Town Stadium

16 November 2010 Asian Games	China	1–0	Vietnam	Guangzhou, China
19:00 UTC+8	Qu Shanshan 87'			Stadium: University Town Stadium

18 November 2010 Asian Games	Vietnam	3–0	Jordan	Guangzhou, China
19:00 UTC+8	Nguyễn Thị Hòa 10', 60'; Nguyễn Thị Muôn 35'			Stadium: Huangpu Sports Center

=== 2011 ===
8 March Hybrid friendly	Hsing Wu College (Chinese Taipei)	0–2	Vietnam	Taipei, Taiwan
--:-- UTC+8		Report

10 March Hybrid friendly	Taichung (Chinese Taipei)	0–2	Vietnam	Taipei, Taiwan
--:-- UTC+8		Report

13 March Hybrid friendly	Taipei University of Education (Chinese Taipei)	0–1	Vietnam	Taipei, Taiwan
--:-- UTC+8		Report

18 March 2012 Summer Olympics qualification	Vietnam	4–0	Hong Kong	Kaohsiung, Taiwan
16:30 UTC+8	Vũ Thị Huyền Linh 13'; Nguyễn Thị Muôn 43', 45'; Nguyễn Kim Tiến 78'			Stadium: Kaohsiung National Stadium

20 March 2012 Summer Olympics qualification	Myanmar	0–2	Vietnam	Kaohsiung, Taiwan
16:30 UTC+8			Nguyễn Thị Muôn 73'; Trần Thị Kim Hồng 75' (pen.)	Stadium: Kaohsiung National Stadium

25 March 2012 Summer Olympics qualification	Vietnam	2–1	Thailand	Kaohsiung, Taiwan
19:00 UTC+8	Nguyễn Thị Hòa 53'; Lê Thu Thanh Hương 90+2'		Chidtawan 1'	Stadium: Kaohsiung National Stadium

27 March 2012 Summer Olympics qualification	Chinese Taipei	1–1	Vietnam	Kaohsiung, Taiwan
19:00 UTC+8	Tsai Li-chen 77'		Nguyễn Thị Hòa 19'	Stadium: Kaohsiung National Stadium

5 June 2012 Summer Olympics qualification	Iran	Cancelled	Vietnam	Amman, Jordan
15:00 UTC+2		Report		Stadium: Amman International Stadium
Note: The Iranian government refused to allow its female players to remove the hijab when playing, in violation of FIFA policy; Jordan, Vietnam, Thailand and Uzbekistan were awarded the respective matches 3–0.

7 June 2012 Summer Olympics qualification	Vietnam	1–0	Jordan	Amman, Jordan
19:00 UTC+2	Nguyễn Thị Hòa 67'			Stadium: Amman International Stadium

10 June 2012 Summer Olympics qualification	Uzbekistan	2–1	Vietnam	Amman, Jordan
16:00 UTC+2	Sarikova 36', 69'		Nguyễn Thị Muôn 90+4'	Stadium: Amman International Stadium

12 June 2012 Summer Olympics qualification	Vietnam	3–3	Thailand	Amman, Jordan
19:00 UTC+2	Lê Thị Thương 8'; Nguyễn Thị Muôn 12'; Lê Thu Thanh Hương 37'		Nguyễn Hải Hòa 18' (o.g.); Kanjana 25'; Wilaiporn 84'	Stadium: King Abdullah Stadium

16 October 2011 AFF Women's Championship	Vietnam	9–1	Singapore	Vientiane, Laos
16:00 UTC+7	Huỳnh Như 7', 65', 78'; Nguyễn Thị Hòa 11', 28', 45', 74'; Nguyễn Thị Kim Tiến 25'; Lê Thị Thương 37'		Yayah 13'	Stadium: New Laos National Stadium

18 October 2011 AFF Women's Championship	Laos	0–4	Vietnam	Vientiane, Laos
19:00 UTC+7			Huỳnh Như 1'; Nguyễn Thị Hòa 8', 29', 33'	Stadium: New Laos National Stadium

20 October 2011 AFF Women's Championship	Indonesia	0–14	Vietnam	Vientiane, Laos
19:00 UTC+7			Nguyễn Thị Liễu 5', 69', 85'; Nguyễn Thị Muôn 5'; Lê Thu Thanh Hương 26', 37', 46'; Phạm Hải Yến 40', 66'; Nguyễn Thị Tuyết Dung 51', 56', 79', 90'; Lê Thị Thủy 75'	Stadium: New Laos National Stadium

23 October 2011 AFF Women's Championship	Vietnam	1–2	Myanmar	Vientiane, Laos
16:00 UTC+7	Lê Thị Thương 43'		Than Than Htwe 60'; Nar Ar Lo Wer Phaw 79'	Stadium: New Laos National Stadium

23 October 2011 AFF Women's Championship	Vietnam	6–0	Laos	Vientiane, Laos
16:00 UTC+7	Lê Thị Thương 1'; Huỳnh Như 3'; Nguyễn Thị Hòa 40', 71'; Chương Thị Kiều 57' (pen.); Lê Thu Thanh Hương 70'			Stadium: New Laos National Stadium

=== 2012 ===
13 September 2012 AFF Women's Championship	Vietnam	10–0	Singapore	Hồ Chí Minh City, Vietnam
18:30 UTC+7	Nguyễn Thị Muôn 7', 18', 24', 40'; Nguyễn Thị Hòa 9'; Nguyễn Thị Minh Nguyệt 49', 54', 63'; Nguyễn Thị Tuyết Dung 55'; Nguyễn Thị Xuyến 76'			Stadium: Thống Nhất Stadium

15 September 2012 AFF Women's Championship	Philippines	2–4	Vietnam	Hồ Chí Minh City, Vietnam
16:00 UTC+7	Cooke 53', 89'		Nguyễn Thị Muôn 17'; Nguyễn Thị Kim Tiến 25'; Lê Thu Thanh Hương 61'; Nguyễn Thị Tuyết Dung 66'	Stadium: Thống Nhất Stadium

17 September 2012 AFF Women's Championship	Myanmar	1–2	Vietnam	Hồ Chí Minh City, Vietnam
16:00 UTC+7	San San Maw 38'		Trần Thị Kim Hồng 8' (pen.); Chương Thị Kiều 77'	Stadium: Thống Nhất Stadium

20 September 2012 AFF Women's Championship	Vietnam	7–0	Laos	Hồ Chí Minh City, Vietnam
16:00 UTC+7	Nguyễn Thị Minh Nguyệt 5', 66'; Nguyễn Thị Muôn 15', 18'; Nguyễn Thị Hòa 68', 72'; Lê Thu Thanh Hương 77'			Stadium: Thống Nhất Stadium

13 September 2012 AFF Women's Championship	Vietnam	0–0 (a.e.t.) (4–3 p)	Myanmar	Hồ Chí Minh City, Vietnam
18:30 UTC+7				Stadium: Thống Nhất Stadium
	Penalties
	Trần Thị Kim Hồng (penalty scored); Lê Thị Thương (penalty scored); Nguyễn Thị Minh Nguyệt (penalty scored); Lê Thu Thanh Hương (penalty scored)		Myint Myint Aye (penalty scored); Phu Pwint Khaing (penalty scored); Nilar Myint (penalty scored); Khin Moe Wai (penalty missed); Khin Marlar Tun (penalty missed)

=== 2013 ===
26 April Friendly	Vietnam	1–1	Jordan	Hanoi, Vietnam
	Nguyễn Thị Liễu 90'		Jbarah 14'	Stadium: Hàng Đẫy Stadium

28 April Friendly	Vietnam	1–0	Jordan	Hanoi, Vietnam
	Huỳnh Như 70'			Stadium: Vietnam YTF Center

16 May Friendly	Jordan	1–5	Vietnam	Amman, Jordan
	(?)		Nguyễn Thị Tuyết Dung (?); Huỳnh Như (?); Nguyễn Thị Nguyệt (?)

18 May Friendly	Jordan	0–2	Vietnam	Amman, Jordan
			Nguyễn Thị Minh Nguyệt (?); Trần Thị Kim Hồng (?)

22 May 2014 AFC Women's Asian Cup qualification	Vietnam	8–0	Bahrain	Riffa, Bahrain
18:00 UTC+3	Nguyễn Thị Minh Nguyệt 3'; Trần Thị Kim Hồng 20'; Nguyễn Thị Xuyến 22'; Nguyễn Thị Muôn 38', 58', 70'; Nguyễn Thị Liễu 45'; Nguyễn Thị Kim Tiến 65'	Report		Stadium: Bahrain National Stadium; Attendance: 200; Referee: Wang Jia (China)

24 May 2014 AFC Women's Asian Cup qualification	Kyrgyzstan	0–12	Vietnam	Riffa, Bahrain
20:30 UTC+3		Report	Nguyễn Thị Minh Nguyệt 3', 12', 22'; Nguyễn Thị Ngọc Anh 5'; Nguyễn Thị Xuyến 14'; Nguyễn Thị Hòa 23', 71'; Nguyễn Thị Muôn 35'; Nguyễn Thị Kim Tiến 50'; Trần Thị Kim Hồng 65'; Huỳnh Như 81', 88'	Stadium: Bahrain National Stadium; Attendance: 50; Referee: Li Juan (China)

26 May 2014 AFC Women's Asian Cup qualification	Vietnam	4–0	Hong Kong	Riffa, Bahrain
18:00 UTC+3	Nguyễn Thị Minh Nguyệt 5'; Nguyễn Thị Hòa 7'; Cheung Wai Ki 30' (o.g.); Trần Thị Kim Hồng 57'	Report		Stadium: Bahrain National Stadium; Attendance: 80; Referee: Rita Gani (Malaysia)

30 August Hybrid friendly	University of Ulsan (South Korea)	3–0	Vietnam	Mokpo, South Korea
--:-- UTC+9		Report		Stadium: Mokpo International Football Center

31 August Hybrid friendly	University of Ulsan (South Korea)	3–2	Vietnam	Mokpo, South Korea
--:-- UTC+9		Report		Stadium: Mokpo International Football Center

9 September 2013 AFF Women's Championship	Thailand	0–0	Vietnam	Yangon, Myanmar
15:30 UTC+6:30				Stadium: Thuwunna Stadium

13 September 2013 AFF Women's Championship	Vietnam	1–0	Malaysia	Yangon, Myanmar
19:30 UTC+6:30	Lê Thị Thương 34'			Stadium: Thuwunna Stadium

15 September 2013 AFF Women's Championship	Jordan	0–4	Vietnam	Yangon, Myanmar
15:30 UTC+6:30			Lê Thị Thương 19'; Lê Thu Thanh Hương 30', 72'; Nguyễn Thị Muôn 84'	Stadium: Thuwunna Stadium

17 September 2013 AFF Women's Championship	Vietnam	0–0	Australia U-20	Yangon, Myanmar
16:00 UTC+6:30				Stadium: Thuwunna Stadium

20 September 2013 AFF Women's Championship	Japan U-23	2–1 (a.e.t.)	Vietnam	Yangon, Myanmar
19:30 UTC+6:30	Sunaga 89'; Takahashi 94'		Nguyễn Thị Minh Nguyệt 36'	Stadium: Thuwunna Stadium

22 September 2013 AFF Women's Championship	Myanmar	1–3	Vietnam	Yangon, Myanmar
15:30 UTC+6:30	San San Maw 24'		Nguyễn Thị Ngọc Anh 2'; Trần Thị Kim Hồng 14'; Nguyễn Thị Minh Nguyệt 66'	Stadium: Thuwunna Stadium

10 November Hybrid friendly	Than Cửa Ông (Vietnam)	1–5	Vietnam	Quảng Ninh, Vietnam
		Report	Lê Thị Thương; Huỳnh Như; Lê Thu Thanh Hương; Nguyễn Thị Liễu	Stadium: Cẩm Phả Stadium

9 December Friendly	Vietnam	11–0	Laos	Mandalay, Myanmar
16:00 UTC+6:30		Report

13 December 2013 SEA Games	Philippines	0–7	Vietnam	Mandalay, Myanmar
16:00 UTC+6:30			Nguyễn Thị Muôn 8', 61'; Nguyễn Thị Minh Nguyệt 10', 70'; Trần Thị Kim Hồng 60'; Nguyễn Thị Tuyết Dung 73'; Huỳnh Như 83'	Stadium: Mandalarthiri Stadium; Referee: Maria Piedade Rebello (India)

15 December 2013 SEA Games	Vietnam	1–0	Myanmar	Mandalay, Myanmar
16:00 UTC+6:30	Lê Thu Thanh Hương 18'			Stadium: Mandalarthiri Stadium; Referee: Kim Sook-He (South Korea)

18 December 2013 SEA Games	Vietnam	4–0	Malaysia	Mandalay, Myanmar
16:00 UTC+6:30	Nguyễn Thị Minh Nguyệt 11', 64'; Nguyễn Thị Tuyết Dung 55'; Huỳnh Như 77'			Stadium: Mandalarthiri Stadium; Referee: He Jin (China)

20 December 2013 SEA Games	Vietnam	1–2	Thailand	Mandalay, Myanmar
19:30 UTC+6:30	Nguyễn Thị Minh Nguyệt 33'		Naphat 40'; Anootsara 47'	Stadium: Mandalarthiri Stadium; Referee: Kim Sook-He (South Korea)

=== 2014 ===
22 April Hybrid friendly	Bayi Guangzhou (China)	0–3	Vietnam	Guangzhou, China
--:-- UTC+8		Report

24 April Hybrid friendly	Guangdong Meizhou (China)	0–1	Vietnam	Guangzhou, China
--:-- UTC+8		Report

25 April Hybrid friendly	Bayi Guangzhou (China)	1–2	Vietnam	Guangzhou, China
--:-- UTC+8		Report

1 May Hybrid friendly	Incheon Hyundai Steel (South Korea)	2–2	Vietnam	Paju, South Korea
--:-- UTC+9		Report		Stadium: Paju Stadium

4 May Hybrid friendly	Incheon Hyundai Steel (South Korea)	2–1	Vietnam	Paju, South Korea
--:-- UTC+9		Report		Stadium: Paju Stadium

8 May Friendly	South Korea	5–0	Vietnam	Paju, South Korea
--:-- UTC+9	5'; 15'; 35'; 77'; 86'	Report		Stadium: Paju Stadium

14 May 2014 AFC Women's Asian Cup	Vietnam	3–1	Jordan	Hồ Chí Minh City, Vietnam
17:15 UTC+7	Nguyễn Thị Muôn 18'; Lê Thu Thanh Hương 36', 84'		Jbarah 34'	Stadium: Thống Nhất Stadium; Attendance: 5,000; Referee: Pannipar Kamnueng (Thailand)

16 May 2014 AFC Women's Asian Cup	Japan	4–0	Vietnam	Hồ Chí Minh City, Vietnam
20:15 UTC+7	Kawasumi 44', 87'; Kiryu 65'; Ogimi 69'			Stadium: Thống Nhất Stadium; Attendance: 1,200; Referee: Abirami Apbai Naidu (Singapore)

18 May 2014 AFC Women's Asian Cup	Vietnam	0–2	Australia	Hồ Chí Minh City, Vietnam
19:15 UTC+7			Lê Thị Thương 42' (o.g.); Gorry 90'	Stadium: Thống Nhất Stadium; Attendance: 3,000; Referee: Pannipar Kamnueng (Thailand)

21 May 2014 AFC Women's Asian Cup	Vietnam	1–2	Thailand	Hồ Chí Minh City, Vietnam
17:15 UTC+7	Nguyễn Thị Tuyết Dung 86'		Kanjana 48', 65'	Stadium: Thống Nhất Stadium; Attendance: 18,000; Referee: Sachiko Yamagishi (Japan)

5 September Friendly	China	5–0	Vietnam	Beijing, China
19:00 UTC+8	Yang Li 16' (?); Gu Yasha 32'			Stadium: Beijing Olympic Sports Centre

16 September 2014 Asian Games	North Korea	5–0	Vietnam	Incheon, South Korea
17:00 UTC+9	Kim Yun-mi 5', 10'; Kim Un-ju 21' (pen.); Ri Ye-gyong 41'; Jong Yu-ri 84' (pen.)			Stadium: Namdong Asiad Rugby Field; Referee: Li Juan (China)

23 September 2014 Asian Games	Vietnam	5–0	Hong Kong	Incheon, South Korea
17:00 UTC+9	Wong So Han 4' (o.g.); Nguyễn Thị Tuyết Dung 14'; Nguyễn Thị Xuyến 45+1' (pen.); Nguyễn Thị Minh Nguyệt 69'; Phạm Hải Yến 80'			Stadium: Namdong Asiad Rugby Field; Referee: Fusako Kajiyama (Japan)

26 September 2014 Asian Games	Thailand	1–2	Vietnam	Goyang, South Korea
16:00 UTC+9	Nisa 51'		Nguyễn Thị Liễu 53'; Nguyễn Thị Tuyết Dung 67'	Stadium: Goyang Stadium; Referee: Kim Sook-hee (South Korea)

29 September 2014 Asian Games	Japan	3–0	Vietnam	Incheon, South Korea
17:00 UTC+9	Sakaguchi 24'; Osafune 53'; Sugasawa 74'			Stadium: Football Stadium; Referee: Maria Rebello (India)

1 October 2014 Asian Games	South Korea	3–0	Vietnam	Incheon, South Korea
17:00 UTC+9	Kwon Hah-nul 55'; Jung Seol-bin 57'; Park Hee-young 67'			Stadium: Football Stadium; Referee: Nami Imaizumi (Japan)

=== 2015 ===
2 May 2015 AFF Women's Championship	Vietnam	3–2	Myanmar	Hồ Chí Minh City, Vietnam
18:30 UTC+7	Huỳnh Như 6', 84'; Nguyễn Thị Minh Nguyệt 30'		Khin Moe Wai 13'; Naw Ar Lo Wer Phaw 23'	Stadium: Thống Nhất Stadium; Attendance: 200; Referee: Rita Gani (Malaysia)

4 May 2015 AFF Women's Championship	Malaysia	0–7	Vietnam	Hồ Chí Minh City, Vietnam
18:30 UTC+7			Huỳnh Như 1', 62'; Trần Thị Hồng Nhung 47'; Nguyễn Thị Nguyệt 59'; Nguyễn Thị Tuyết Dung 78', 82', 90+1'	Stadium: Thống Nhất Stadium; Attendance: 1,200; Referee: Patchaya Boonprasit (Thailand)

6 May 2015 AFF Women's Championship	Philippines	0–4	Vietnam	Hồ Chí Minh City, Vietnam
18:30 UTC+7			Nguyễn Thị Minh Nguyệt 3', 27', 38' (pen.); Trần Thị Thùy Trang 11'	Stadium: Thống Nhất Stadium; Attendance: Rita Gani (Malaysia); Referee: 2,000

8 May 2015 AFF Women's Championship	Vietnam	1–2 (a.e.t.)	Thailand	Hồ Chí Minh City, Vietnam
19:30 UTC+7	Nguyễn Thị Liễu 30'		Nisa 52', 92'	Stadium: Thống Nhất Stadium; Attendance: 13,000; Referee: Thein Thein Aye (Myanmar)

10 May 2015 AFF Women's Championship	Australia U-20	4–3	Vietnam	Hồ Chí Minh City, Vietnam
16:00 UTC+7	Ferguson 4'; Ibini-Isei 56', 90+1'; Goad 73'		Nguyễn Thị Minh Nguyệt 11' (pen.), 31'; Nguyễn Thị Tuyết Dung 84'	Stadium: Thống Nhất Stadium; Attendance: 800; Referee: Patchaya Boonprasit (Thailand)

19 May Friendly	Australia	4–0	Vietnam	Sydney, Australia
	Catley 17'; Foord 29'; Simon 47'; Heyman 48'	Report		Stadium: Valentine Sports Park; Attendance: 0 (behind closed doors)

21 May Friendly	Australia	11–0	Vietnam	Sydney, Australia
	Gorry 7'; Heyman 12', 19', 30'; Alleway 14'; De Vanna 15', 61'; Kerr 18', 48'; Van Egmond 21'; Foord 84'	Report		Stadium: Jubilee Oval; Attendance: 4,277

26 August Hybrid friendly	Shizuoka Sangyo University (Japan)	1–2	Vietnam	Shizuoka, Japan
--:-- UTC+8		Report		Stadium: Tokinosumika Sports Center

29 August Hybrid friendly	Nojima Stella (Japan)	2–0	Vietnam	Shizuoka, Japan
--:-- UTC+8		Report		Stadium: Tokinosumika Sports Center

1 September Hybrid friendly	Urawa Reds (Japan)	1–0	Vietnam	Shizuoka, Japan
--:-- UTC+8		Report		Stadium: Tokinosumika Sports Center

3 September Hybrid friendly	AC Fukushima (Japan)	1–2	Vietnam	Shizuoka, Japan
--:-- UTC+8		Report		Stadium: Tokinosumika Sports Center

14 September 2016 AFC Women's Olympic Qualifying Tournament	Chinese Taipei	1–0	Vietnam	Mandalay, Myanmar
15:30 UTC+6:30	Lin Chiung-ying 85'	Report		Stadium: Mandalarthiri Stadium; Attendance: 475; Referee: Kim Sook-hee (South Korea)

18 September 2016 AFC Women's Olympic Qualifying Tournament	Vietnam	4–2	Myanmar	Mandalay, Myanmar
18:30 UTC+6:30	Huỳnh Như 16', 74'; Nguyễn Thị Minh Nguyệt 22', 45+1' (pen.)	Report	Wai Wai Aung 85'; Khin Moe Wai 88'	Stadium: Mandalarthiri Stadium; Attendance: 7,485; Referee: Kim Sook-hee (South Korea)

20 September 2016 AFC Women's Olympic Qualifying Tournament	Vietnam	2–1	Jordan	Mandalay, Myanmar
15:30 UTC+6:30	Nguyễn Thị Minh Nguyệt 18' (pen.), 45+1'	Report	Jbarah 76'	Stadium: Mandalarthiri Stadium; Attendance: 115; Referee: Nami Imaizumi (Japan)

20 September 2016 AFC Women's Olympic Qualifying Tournament	Thailand	0–2	Vietnam	Mandalay, Myanmar
15:30 UTC+6:30		Report	Nguyễn Thị Minh Nguyệt 39', 83'	Stadium: Mandalarthiri Stadium; Attendance: 276; Referee: Wang Jia (China)

=== 2016 ===
21 January 2016 Four Nations Tournament	South Korea	5–0	Vietnam	Foshan, China
19:30 UTC+8	Lee Min-a 14'; Lee Hyun-young 45+1'; Yoo Young-a 47'; Kim Soo-yun 52'; Lee So-dam 88'			Stadium: Shenzhen Universiade Sports Centre

23 January 2016 Four Nations Tournament	China	8–0	Vietnam	Foshan, China
19:30 UTC+8	Zhang Rui 12', 53'; Zhao Xue 36'; Ma Xiaoxu 50', 89'; Wang Shanshan 65', 80'; Lui Jiahui 70'			Stadium: Shenzhen Universiade Sports Centre

26 January 2016 Four Nations Tournament	Mexico	1–0	Vietnam	Foshan, China
19:30 UTC+8	Domínguez 87'			Stadium: Shenzhen Universiade Sports Centre

29 February 2016 AFC Women's Olympic Qualifying Tournament	China	2–0	Vietnam	Osaka, Japan
16:35 UTC+9	Gu Yasha 57'; Zhang Rui 63' (pen.)			Stadium: Nagai Stadium; Attendance: 368; Referee: Lucilas Montes (Mexico)

2 March 2016 AFC Women's Olympic Qualifying Tournament	Australia	9–0	Vietnam	Osaka, Japan
16:35 UTC+9	Gielnik 10'; Simon 17', 38', 43'; Kennedy 19'; Skyes 64'; Van Egmond 68'; Heyman 77'; Polkinghorne 85'			Stadium: Nagai Stadium; Attendance: 129; Referee: Esther Staubli (Switzerland)

4 March 2016 AFC Women's Olympic Qualifying Tournament	Vietnam	0–1	North Korea	Osaka, Japan
16:35 UTC+9			Ju Hyo-sim 90'	Stadium: Nagai Stadium; Attendance: 996; Referee: Abirami Apbai Naidu (Singapore)

7 March 2016 AFC Women's Olympic Qualifying Tournament	Vietnam	1–6	Japan	Osaka, Japan
19:35 UTC+9	Huỳnh Như 42' (pen.)		Iwabuchi 39'; Ohno 45'; Kawasumi 80'; Nakajima 83'; Yokoyama 90'; Ogimi 90+3'	Stadium: Kincho Stadium; Attendance: 3,418; Referee: Rita Gani (Malaysia)

9 March 2016 AFC Women's Olympic Qualifying Tournament	South Korea	4–0	Vietnam	Osaka, Japan
16:35 UTC+9	Lim Seon-joo 8', 18'; Lee Geun-min 69'; Jeon Ga-eul 85'			Stadium: Nagai Stadium; Attendance: 99; Referee: Abirami Apbai Naidu (Singapore)

13 July Hybrid friendly	Carl Zeiss Jena (Germany)	2–2	Vietnam	Oberau, Germany
16:00 UTC+1	45'; 89'	Report	Nguyễn Thị Minh Nguyệt 21' (pen.); Huỳnh Như 75'	Stadium: Hessen Stadium

15 July Hybrid friendly	Sparta Prague (Czech Republic)	3–1	Vietnam	Prague, Czech Republic
16:00 UTC+1	10'; 40'; 45+2'	Report	Vũ Thị Nhung 12'

17 July Hybrid friendly	Viktoria Plzen (Czech Republic)	0–4	Vietnam	Plzeň, Czech Republic
16:00 UTC+1		Report	Nguyễn Thị Minh Nguyệt 3'; Nguyễn Thị Tuyết Dung 10', 35'; Nguyễn Thị Muôn 30'	Attendance: 500

19 July Hybrid friendly	Dukla Prague (Czech Republic)	0–5	Vietnam	Prague, Czech Republic
16:00 UTC+1		Report	Nguyễn Thị Tuyết Dung 7'; Nguyễn Thị Minh Nguyệt 24'; Nguyễn Thị Muôn 30'; Nguyễn Thị Nguyệt; Phạm Hải Yến

26 July 2016 AFF Women's Championship	Vietnam	14–0	Singapore	Mandalay, Myanmar
18:00 UTC+6:30	Nguyễn Thị Xuyến 4'; Nguyễn Thị Liễu 8', 80'; Nguyễn Thị Muôn 10', 45+1', 47', 53', 59', 61'; Nguyễn Thị Tuyết Dung 17', 50'; Nguyễn Thị Minh Nguyệt 25'; Nur Izyani 36' (o.g.); Phạm Hải Yến 67'			Stadium: Mandalarthiri Stadium; Referee: Law Bik Chi (Hong Kong)

28 July 2016 AFF Women's Championship	Philippines	0–4	Vietnam	Mandalay, Myanmar
15:00 UTC+6:30			Nguyễn Thị Hòa 7'; Nguyễn Thị Tuyết Dung 30', 71'; Nguyễn Thị Minh Nguyệt 80'	Stadium: Mandalarthiri Stadium; Referee: Thein Thein Aye (Myanmar)

30 July 2016 AFF Women's Championship	Thailand	0–2	Vietnam	Mandalay, Myanmar
18:00 UTC+6:30			Huỳnh Như 85'; Nguyễn Thị Nguyệt 90+4'	Stadium: Mandalarthiri Stadium; Referee: Oh Hyeon-jeong (South Korea)

2 August 2016 AFF Women's Championship	Vietnam	3–3 (a.e.t.) (5–4 p)	Myanmar	Mandalay, Myanmar
18:00 UTC+6:30	Huỳnh Như 15'; Nguyễn Thị Tuyết Dung 17'; Nguyễn Thị Minh Nguyệt 90+4' (pen.)		Win Theingi Tun 59', 90+1'; May Thu Kyaw 76'	Stadium: Mandalarthiri Stadium; Attendance: 31,000; Referee: Oh Hyeon-jeong (South Korea)
	Penalties
	Chương Thị Kiều (penalty scored); Nguyễn Thị Minh Nguyệt (penalty scored); Nguyễn Thị Tuyết Dung (penalty scored); Nguyễn Thị Xuyến (penalty scored); Nguyễn Thị Bích Thùy (penalty scored)		(penalty scored) Win Theingi Tun; (penalty scored) Le Le Hlaing; (penalty missed) Khin Marlar Tun; (penalty scored) Khin Than Wai; (penalty scored) Khin Moe Wai

4 August 2016 AFF Women's Championship	Vietnam	1–1 (a.e.t.) (5–6 p)	Thailand	Mandalay, Myanmar
18:00 UTC+6:30	Nguyễn Thị Minh Nguyệt 85'		Rattikan 7'	Stadium: Mandalarthiri Stadium; Referee: Thein Thein Aye (Myanmar)
	Penalties
	Nguyễn Thị Minh Nguyệt (penalty missed); Nguyễn Thị Tuyết Dung (penalty scored); Nguyễn Thị Muôn (penalty missed); Nguyễn Thị Xuyến (penalty scored); Chương Thị Kiều (penalty scored); Nguyễn Thị Liễu (penalty missed); Vũ Thị Nhung (penalty scored); Bùi Thúy An (penalty scored); Trần Thị Phương Thảo (penalty missed)		(penalty scored) Anootsara; (penalty missed) Sunisa; (penalty scored) Kanjana; (penalty missed) Naphat; (penalty scored) Nipawan; (penalty missed) Rattikan; (penalty scored) Pikul; (penalty scored) Duangnapa; (penalty scored) Natthakarn

=== 2017 ===
8 March Hybrid friendly	Vietnam	9–0	(Vietnam) Hanoi	Hanoi, Vietnam
--:-- UTC+7		Report		Stadium: Vietnam Youth Football Training Center

5 April 2018 AFC Women's Asian Cup qualification	Syria	0–11	Vietnam	Hanoi, Vietnam
18:00 UTC+7		Report	Nguyễn Thị Liễu 1', 45+1'; Phạm Hải Yến 6', 24'; Nguyễn Thị Tuyết Dung 13' (pen.), 38'; Nguyễn Thị Nguyệt 17'; Nguyễn Thị Hòa 20', 90'; Nguyễn Thị Muôn 71'; Nguyễn Thị Thúy Hằng 76'	Stadium: Vietnam YFT Center; Attendance: 300; Referee: Mi Siyu (China)

7 April 2018 AFC Women's Asian Cup qualification	Vietnam	8–0	Singapore	Hanoi, Vietnam
18:00 UTC+7		Report	Pang 8' (o.g.); Huỳnh Như 21' (pen.), 52', 63'; Vũ Thị Nhung 36'; Trần Thị Thùy Trang 45+1'; Nguyễn Thị Bích Thùy 67' (pen.); Nguyễn Thị Nguyệt 81'	Stadium: Vietnam YFT Center; Attendance: 300; Referee: Edita Mirabidova (Uzbekistan)

9 April 2018 AFC Women's Asian Cup qualification	Iran	1–6	Vietnam	Hanoi, Vietnam
18:00 UTC+7	Ghanbari 8'	Report	Nguyễn Thị Tuyết Dung 15'; Phạm Hải Yến 25', 79'; Huỳnh Như 61', 82'; Nguyễn Thị Hòa 74'	Stadium: Vietnam YFT Center Field no.3 Attendance: 380; Referee: Ri Hyang-ok (North Korea)

11 April 2018 AFC Women's Asian Cup qualification	Vietnam	2–0	Myanmar	Hanoi, Vietnam
18:00 UTC+7	Nguyễn Thị Tuyết Dung 55'; Huỳnh Như 82'	Report		Stadium: Vietnam YFT Center; Attendance: 750; Referee: Qin Liang (China)

2 August Hybrid friendly	Okayama Yunogo Belle (Japan)	1–2	Vietnam	Okayama, Japan
--:-- UTC+9	10'	Report	Huỳnh Như 10', 32'

5 August Hybrid friendly	Harima Albion (Japan)	2–1	Vietnam	Himeji, Japan
--:-- UTC+9		Report	Phạm Hải Yến 70'

8 August Hybrid friendly	Okayama Selection Team (Japan)	1–1	Vietnam	Okayama, Japan
--:-- UTC+9	39'	Report	Vũ Thị Nhung 7'

10 August Hybrid friendly	Okayama Yunogo Belle (Japan)	1–1	Vietnam	Okayama, Japan
--:-- UTC+9		Report	Nguyễn Thị Nguyệt 88'

17 August 2017 SEA Games	Philippines	0–3	Vietnam	Kuala Lumpur, Malaysia
16:00 UTC+8		Report	Huỳnh Như 65'; Nguyễn Thị Tuyết Dung 84'; Nguyễn Thị Muôn 90+4'	Stadium: UM Arena Stadium; Referee: Yu Hong (China)

20 August 2017 SEA Games	Vietnam	3–1	Myanmar	Kuala Lumpur, Malaysia
16:00 UTC+08:00	Phạm Hải Yến 19'; Nguyễn Thị Bích Thùy 73'; Huỳnh Như 83'	Report	Win Theingi Tun 59'	Stadium: UM Arena Stadium; Attendance: 700; Referee: Kim Jin-hye (South Korea)

22 August 2017 SEA Games	Vietnam	1–1	Thailand	Shah Alam, Malaysia
16:00 UTC+08:00	Phạm Hải Yến 11'	Report	Rattikan 41'	Stadium: UiTM Stadium; Referee: Choki Om (Bhutan)

24 August 2017 SEA Games	Malaysia	0–6	Vietnam	Shah Alam, Malaysia
19:45 UTC+08:00		Report	Vũ Thị Nhung 7'; Nguyễn Thị Liễu 13', 79'; Nguyễn Thị Muôn 40', 54'; Huỳnh Như 45'	Stadium: UiTM Stadium; Referee: Law Bik Chi (Hong Kong)

=== 2018 ===
19 January 2016 Four Nations Tournament	China	4–0	Vietnam	Foshan, China
19:35 UTC+8	Jin Kun 26'; Wang Shanshan 47'; Wang Shuang 60'; Song Duan 84'			Stadium: Century Lotus Stadium

21 January 2016 Four Nations Tournament	Vietnam	0–2	Colombia	Foshan, China
19:35 UTC+8			González 18'; Usme 36'	Stadium: Century Lotus Stadium

23 January 2016 Four Nations Tournament	Thailand	2–0	Vietnam	Foshan, China
16:00 UTC+8	Taneekarn 83'; Kanjana 90' (pen.)			Stadium: Century Lotus Stadium

26 March Hybrid friendly	Bayern Munich (Germany)	1–1	Vietnam	Munich, Germany
17:00 UTC+2	75'	Report	Huỳnh Như 40'	Stadium: Allianz Arena

29 March Hybrid friendly	Borussia Mönchengladbach (Germany)	0–11	Vietnam	Mönchengladbach, Germany
18:00 UTC+2		Report		Stadium: Borussia-Park

7 April 2018 AFC Women's Asian Cup	Japan	4–0	Vietnam	Amman, Jordan
16:45 UTC+3	Yokoyama 3'; Nakajima 17'; Iwabuchi 57'; Tanaka 66'	Report		Stadium: King Abdullah II Stadium; Attendance: 142; Referee: Thein Thein Aye (Myanmar)

10 April 2018 AFC Women's Asian Cup	Vietnam	0–8	Australia	Amman, Jordan
20:00 UTC+3		Report	Simon 8'; Kennedy 18'; Logarzo 21'; Van Egmond 28'; Kerr 44', 51'; Nguyễn Thị Tuyết Dung 71' (o.g.); Raso 75'	Stadium: Amman International Stadium; Attendance: 401; Referee: Edita Mirabidova (Uzbekistan)

13 April 2018 AFC Women's Asian Cup	South Korea	4–0	Vietnam	Amman, Jordan
16:45 UTC+3	Cho So-hyun 14'; Lee Geum-min 38'; Lee Min-a 49', 73'	Report		Stadium: King Abdullah II Stadium; Attendance: 86; Referee: Mahsa Ghorbani (Iran)

3 July 2018 AFF Women's Championship	Indonesia	0–6	Vietnam	Palembang, Indonesia
16:00 UTC+7		Report	Huỳnh Như 2', 52'; Nguyễn Thị Vạn 28'; Phạm Hải Yến 41'; Thái Thị Thảo 48'; Nguyễn Thị Tuyết Dung 63'	Stadium: Jakabaring Stadium; Attendance: 100; Referee: Thein Thein Aye (Myanmar)

5 July 2018 AFF Women's Championship	Vietnam	10–0	Singapore	Palembang, Indonesia
16:00 UTC+7	Hoàng Thị Loan 27'; Nguyễn Thị Tuyết Dung 31' (pen.), 34'; Nguyễn Thị Vạn 54', 66', 78'; Phạm Hoàng Quỳnh 62'	Report		Stadium: Jakabaring Stadium; Attendance: 50; Referee: Rebecca Durcau (Australia)

7 July 2018 AFF Women's Championship	Philippines	0–5	Vietnam	Palembang, Indonesia
19:00 UTC+7		Report	Nguyễn Thị Vạn 1'; Huỳnh Như 12', 30'; Phạm Hoàng Quỳnh 41'; Thái Thị Thảo 78'	Stadium: Jakabaring Stadium; Attendance: 50; Referee: Rebecca Durcau (Australia)

9 July 2018 AFF Women's Championship	Vietnam	4–3	Myanmar	Palembang, Indonesia
19:00 UTC+7	Phạm Hải Yến 22', 50'; Huỳnh Như 55', 77'	Report	Win Theingi Tun 58', 87'; Khin Marlar Tun 90+3'	Stadium: Jakabaring Stadium; Attendance: 100; Referee: Fatmawati Deliana (Indonesia)

11 July 2018 AFF Women's Championship	Vietnam	2–4	Australia U20	Palembang, Indonesia
16:00 UTC+7	Nguyễn Thị Tuyết Dung 17', 90'	Report	Chidiac 18', 76'; Nevin 35'; Cooney-Cross 65'	Stadium: Jakabaring Stadium; Attendance: 100; Referee: Abirami Naidu (Singapore)

13 July 2018 AFF Women's Championship	Myanmar	0–3	Vietnam	Palembang, Indonesia
16:00 UTC+7		Report	Nguyễn Thị Tuyết Dung 10'; Nguyễn Thị Vạn 69'; Phạm Hải Yến 70'	Stadium: Jakabaring Stadium; Attendance: 100; Referee: Rebecca Durcau (Australia)

19 July Friendly	Vietnam	4–3	Chinese Taipei	Hanoi, Vietnam
--:-- UTC+7		Report		Stadium: Vietnam Youth Football Training Center

25 July Friendly	Vietnam	4–0	Chinese Taipei	Hanoi, Vietnam
--:-- UTC+7		Report		Stadium: Vietnam Youth Football Training Center

2 August Hybrid friendly	Okayama Yunogo Belle (Japan)	2–2	Vietnam	Okayama, Japan
16:00 UTC+9	43'; 85'	Report	Nguyễn Thị Vạn 17'; Nguyễn Thị Tuyết Dung 57'

9 August Hybrid friendly	Kibi University (Japan)	0–6	Vietnam	Okayama, Japan
16:00 UTC+9		Report

19 August 2018 Asian Games	Vietnam	3–2	Thailand	Palembang, Indonesia
18:30 UTC+7	Nguyễn Thị Tuyết Dung 22'; Nguyễn Thị Vạn 33'; Nguyễn Thị Liễu 40'	Report	Suchawadee 30' (pen.); Pitsamai 79'	Stadium: Bumi Sriwijaya Stadium; Referee: Mahsa Ghorbani (Iran)

21 August 2018 Asian Games	Japan	7–0	Vietnam	Palembang, Indonesia
15:00 UTC+7	Sugasawa 5', 77'; Momiki 17'; Nakajima 38'; Tanaka 52', 88'; Masuya 64'	Report		Stadium: Gelora Sriwijaya Stadium; Referee: Thein Thein Aye (Myanmar)

24 August 2018 Asian Games	Chinese Taipei	0–0 (a.e.t.) (4–3 p)	Vietnam	Palembang, Indonesia
19:30 UTC+7		Report		Stadium: Gelora Sriwijaya Stadium; Referee: Oh Hyeon-jeong (South Korea)
	Penalties
	Yu Hsiu-chin (penalty scored); Lin Ya-han (penalty scored); Liu Chien-yun (penalty scored); Michelle Pao (penalty scored)		(penalty scored) Nguyễn Thị Tuyết Dung; (penalty scored) Chương Thị Kiều; (penalty missed) Phạm Hoàng Quỳnh; (penalty scored) Nguyễn Thị Mỹ Anh; (penalty missed) Thái Thị Thảo

=== 2019 ===
16 March Friendly	Vietnam	1–0	(Vietnam) Hanoi	Hanoi, Vietnam
--:-- UTC+7	Huỳnh Như	Report

21 March Friendly	Myanmar	0–1	Vietnam	Mandalay, Myanmar
18:00 UTC+6:30		Report	Nguyễn Thị Vạn 51'	Stadium: Mandalarthiri Stadium

23 March Friendly	Myanmar	3–2	Vietnam	Mandalay, Myanmar
18:00 UTC+6:30	Khin Moe Wai 24'; Win Theingi Tun 76', 80'	Report	Nguyễn Thị Tuyḗt Dung 16', 19'	Stadium: Mandalarthiri Stadium

3 April 2020 AFC Women's Olympic Qualifying Tournament	Vietnam	2–1	Uzbekistan	Tashkent, Uzbekistan
15:00 UTC+5	Huỳnh Như 8'; Nguyễn Thị Tuyết Dung 57' (pen.)	Report	Kuchkarova 11'	Stadium: Lokomotiv Stadium; Attendance: 306; Referee: Oh Hyeon-jeong (South Korea)

6 April 2020 AFC Women's Olympic Qualifying Tournament	Hong Kong	1–2	Vietnam	Tashkent, Uzbekistan
15:00 UTC+5	Wai Yuen Ting 48'	Report	Sin Chung Yee 24' (o.g.); Huỳnh Như 40'	Stadium: Transportation Institute Stadium; Attendance: 50; Referee: Doumouh Al-Bakkar (Lebanon)

9 April 2020 AFC Women's Olympic Qualifying Tournament	Vietnam	2–0	Jordan	Tashkent, Uzbekistan
15:00 UTC+5	Nguyễn Thị Vạn 65'; Huỳnh Như 67'	Report		Stadium: Transportation Institute Stadium; Attendance: 30; Referee: Oh Hyeon-jeong (South Korea)

25 July Hybrid friendly	Than KSVN (Vietnam)	1–3	Vietnam	Quảng Ninh, Vietnam
--:-- UTC+7	Phạm Thị Thúy Hằng 62'	Report	Phạm Hải Yến 23', 30'; Vũ Thị Nhung 33'	Stadium: Cẩm Phả Stadium

2 August Hybrid friendly	Miyagi Prefecture (Japan)	1–1	Vietnam	Fukushima, Japan
16:00 UTC+9		Report

4 August Hybrid friendly	MyNavi Sendai (Japan)	3–0	Vietnam	Fukushima, Japan
16:00 UTC+9		Report		Stadium: Toho Stadium

7 August Hybrid friendly	Niigata Prefecture (Japan)	1–0	Vietnam	Fukushima, Japan
16:00 UTC+9		Report

16 August 2019 AFF Women's Championship	Vietnam	10–0	Cambodia	Chonburi, Thailand
18:00 UTC+7	Huỳnh Như 3', 7'; Sreyneat 4' (o.g.); Phạm Hải Yến 15', 16', 84'; Nguyễn Thị Bích Thùy 17', 19', 24', 69'	Report		Stadium: IPE Chonburi Stadium 1 Attendance: 150; Referee: Abirami Naidu (Singapore)

18 August 2019 AFF Women's Championship	Indonesia	0–7	Vietnam	Chonburi, Thailand
15:00 UTC+7		Report	Nguyễn Thị Bích Thùy 1'; Huỳnh Như 19', 40', 43'; Phạm Hải Yến 22'; Nguyễn Thị Tuyết Dung 61', 63'	Stadium: IPE Chonburi Stadium 1 Attendance: 20; Referee: Rita Gani (Malaysia)

20 August 2019 AFF Women's Championship	Myanmar	0–4	Vietnam	Chonburi, Thailand
15:00 UTC+7		Report	Phạm Hải Yến 13', 61'; Thái Thị Thảo 43'; Nguyễn Thị Tuyết Dung 64' (pen.)	Stadium: IPE Chonburi Stadium 1 Attendance: 70; Referee: Lee Yi-chi (Chinese Taipei)

25 August 2019 AFF Women's Championship	Vietnam	2–1	Philippines	Chonburi, Thailand
15:00 UTC+7	Huỳnh Như 41'; Nguyễn Thị Tuyết Dung 57'	Report	Trần Thị Hồng Nhung 35' (o.g.)	Stadium: IPE Chonburi Stadium 1 Attendance: 40; Referee: Oh Hyeon-jeong (South Korea)

27 August 2019 AFF Women's Championship	Thailand	0–1 (a.e.t.)	Vietnam	Chonburi, Thailand
18:00 UTC+7		Report	Huỳnh Như 93'	Stadium: IPE Chonburi Stadium 1 Attendance: 300; Referee: Abirami Naidu (Singapore)

3 November Friendly	Vietnam	3–0	India	Hanoi, Vietnam
15:00 UTC+7	Thị Nhung 16'; Thị Tuyết Dung 83'; Thị Thúy Hằng 90+1'	AIFF		Stadium: Vietnam Youth Football Training Centre

6 November Friendly	India	1–1	Vietnam	Hanoi, Vietnam
15:15 UTC+7	Ranjana Chanu 57'	Report	Thái Thị Thảo 39'	Stadium: Vietnam Youth Football Training Centre

13 November Hybrid friendly	Okayama Yunogo Belle (Japan)	2–3	Vietnam	Okayama, Japan
16:00 UTC+9		Report

15 November Hybrid friendly	Okayama Yunogo Belle (Japan)	2–0	Vietnam	Okayama, Japan
16:00 UTC+9		Report

17 November Hybrid friendly	Okayama Yunogo Belle (Japan)	0–2	Vietnam	Okayama, Japan
16:00 UTC+9		Report

19 November Hybrid friendly	Japan U-17	1–0	Vietnam	Okayama, Japan
16:00 UTC+9		Report

26 November 2019 SEA Games	Vietnam	1–1	Thailand	Biñan, Philippines
16:00 UTC+8	Dương Thị Vân 45+1'	Report	Taneekarn 87'	Stadium: Biñan Football Stadium; Referee: Choki Om (Bhutan)

29 November 2019 SEA Games	Indonesia	0–6	Vietnam	Biñan, Philippines
16:00 UTC+8		Report	Nguyễn Thị Tuyết Dung 9', 84'; Nguyễn Thị Vạn 14', 19'; Huỳnh Như 50', 60'	Stadium: Biñan Football Stadium; Attendance: 101; Referee: Cha Min-ji (South Korea)

5 December 2019 SEA Games	Vietnam	2–0	Philippines	Biñan, Philippines
20:00 UTC+8	Thái Thị Thảo 60'; Nguyễn Thị Tuyết Dung 84'	Report		Stadium: Biñan Football Stadium; Attendance: 2,510; Referee: Mi Suyu (China)

8 December 2019 SEA Games	Thailand	0–1 (a.e.t.)	Vietnam	Manila, Philippines
20:00 UTC+8		Report	Phạm Hải Yến 92'	Stadium: Rizal Memorial Stadium; Attendance: 2,243; Referee: Asaka Koizumi (Japan)
