= Philippines women's national football team results (2000–2009) =

- Win Draw Loss

This is a list of the Philippines women's national football team results from 2000 to 2009.

== Results ==
=== 2001 ===
May 31 PFF Women's Invitational Championships	Philippines	10–0	Guam SSC	Quezon City
	Gayagoy 4x' Naungca 2x' delos Reyes 2x' Octavio de Jesus	Report		Stadium: Moro Lorenzo Football Field

June 5 PFF Women's Invitational Championships	Philippines	5–0	Singapore	Pasig
		Report		Stadium: PhilSports Complex

December 5 2001 AFC Women's Championship	Uzbekistan	5–0	Philippines	New Taipei City

December 7 2001 AFC Women's Championship	Hong Kong	2–1	Philippines	New Taipei City

December 9 2001 AFC Women's Championship	China	10–0	Philippines	New Taipei City

=== 2003 ===
June 9 2003 AFC Women's Championship	Japan	15–0	Philippines	Bangkok
				Stadium: Rajamangala Stadium

June 11 2003 AFC Women's Championship	Philippines	0–6	Myanmar	Bangkok
				Stadium: Rajamangala Stadium

June 13 2003 AFC Women's Championship	Philippines	0–4	Chinese Taipei	Bangkok
				Stadium: Rajamangala Stadium

June 17 2003 AFC Women's Championship	Philippines	2–1	Guam	Bangkok
18:15	Josephine Loren 32'; Rhea Penales 70'	report	Rhoda Limpin Santos 24'	Stadium: Rajamangala Stadium; Attendance: 200; Referee: Deng Junxia (China)

October 31 Women Four Nations Tournament	Malaysia	0–4	Philippines	Kuala Lumpur
		Report

November 2 Women Four Nations Tournament	Thailand	4–1	Philippines	Kuala Lumpur
	Thangtham; Takorum 52'; Piamsin 55'; Saipin 80'	Report	Penales 59'

November 4 Women Four Nations Tournament	Philippines	5–0	Indonesia	Kuala Lumpur
		Report

December 2 2003 Southeast Asian Games	Philippines	0–0	Malaysia	Hai Phong
		Report		Stadium: Lạch Tray Stadium

=== 2004 ===
September 30 2004 AFF Women's Championship	Indonesia	1–0	Philippines	Vietnam
	Wiwin Yuniggishi 8'	Report

October 2 2004 AFF Women's Championship	Philippines	2–1	Singapore	Vietnam
	Maria Lazaro 5'; Agravante 46'	Report	Azreen Ma'at 6'

October 4 2004 AFF Women's Championship	Vietnam B	5–0	Philippines	Vietnam
	Đỗ Hồng Tiến 17', 89'; Văn Thị Thanh 20'; Đoàn Thị Kim Chi 25'; Lưu Ngọc Mai ?'	Report

=== 2005 ===
November 12 Unofficial friendly	Philippines	0–1	Hong Kong	Pasay
		Report		Stadium: PhilSports Stadium

November 12 Unofficial friendly	Philippines	5–0	Hong Kong	Pasay
		Report		Stadium: PhilSports Stadium

November 14 Unofficial friendly	Philippines	4–1	Hong Kong	Pasay
	Agravante 30'; Delos Reyes 71'; Rubio 72'; Loren 77'	Report	Camarillo 5' (o.g.)	Stadium: PhilSports Stadium

November 24 2005 Southeast Asian Games	Philippines	0–1	Thailand	Marikina
18:30		Report	Pitsamai 65'	Stadium: Marikina Sports Complex; Attendance: 8,000

November 26 2005 Southeast Asian Games	Philippines	2–0	Indonesia	Marikina
18:30	A. Impelido 30'; Alley 82'	Report		Stadium: Marikina Sports Complex

November 28 2005 Southeast Asian Games	Vietnam	5–1	Philippines	Marikina
18:30	Lê Thị Oanh 4', 13', 35', 65'; Văn Thị Thanh 90'		Luto 31'	Stadium: Marikina Sports Complex

November 30 2005 Southeast Asian Games	Philippines	1–3	Myanmar	Marikina
16:00	Impelido 61'		Marlar Win 14', 66', 69'	Stadium: Marikina Sports Complex

=== 2007 ===
June 16 Friendly	Philippines	3–0	Singapore	Pasay, Philippines
	Benitez 46'; Agravante 61'; Delos Reyes 85'	Report		Stadium: PhilSports Stadium

June 18 Friendly	Philippines	0–2	Singapore	Pasay, Philippines
		Report	Mishairati 4'; Luo Jianzhen 22'	Stadium: PhilSports Stadium

September 7 2007 AFF Women's Championship	Vietnam	9–0	Philippines	Yangon, Myanmar
17:45	Đoàn Thị Kim Chi 3' (pen.); Văn Thị Thanh 6'; Bùi Thị Tuyết Mai ?'; Đỗ Thị Ngọc Châm ?', ?', ?'; Lê Thị Thương ?', ?'; Lê Thị Hồng Nga ?'	Report		Stadium: Thuwunna Stadium

September 9 2007 AFF Women's Championship	Indonesia	3–2	Philippines	Yangon, Myanmar
15:30		Report		Stadium: Thuwunna Stadium

September 11 2007 AFF Women's Championship	Philippines	1–2	Malaysia	Yangon, Myanmar
15:30		Report		Stadium: Aung San Stadium

October 20 2008 AFC AC Q.	Hong Kong	2–3	Philippines	Hong Kong
		Report		Stadium: Siu Sai Wan Sports Ground

October 22 2008 AFC AC Q.	Philippines	1–1	Hong Kong	Hong Kong
		Report		Stadium: Siu Sai Wan Sports Ground

December 3 2007 Southeast Asian Games	Laos	2–2	Philippines	Nakhon Ratchasima
15:15 UTC+7	Phaivanh Souphavanh 39'; Teng Sengmany 61'		P. Impelido 48'; Agravante 50'	Stadium: Municipality of Tumbon Mueangpug Stadium; Referee: Rita Gani (Malaysia)

December 5 2007 Southeast Asian Games	Philippines	0–10	Vietnam	Nakhon Ratchasima
15:15 UTC+7			Đỗ Thị Ngọc Châm 19', 33', 39', 44'; Đoàn Thị Kim Chi 23', 36'; Trần Thị Kim Hồng 53'; Nguyễn Thị Minh Nguyệt 61', 76'; Bùi Thị Tuyết Mai 78'	Stadium: Municipality of Tumbon Mueangpug Stadium; Referee: Daw San San Myint (Myanmar)

=== 2008 ===
March 24 2008 AFC AC Q.	South Korea	4–0	Philippines	Nakhon Ratchasima
	Lee Sea-Eun 9', 18', 84' (pen.); Lee Eun-Mi 73' (pen.)			Stadium: 80th Birthday Stadium

March 26 2008 AFC AC Q.	Philippines	0–9	Thailand	Nakhon Ratchasima
			Maijarern 7'; Romyen 8', 43'; Sornsai 11', 31', 81'; Chawong 17', 90+1'; Kaeobaen 84'	Stadium: 80th Birthday Stadium

March 28 2008 AFC AC Q.	Malaysia	0–0	Philippines	Nakhon Ratchasima
				Stadium: Suranaree University of Technology Football Field

October 9 2008 AFF Championship	Philippines	3–1	Singapore	Ho Chi Minh City
		Report		Stadium: Thanh Long Sports Centre

October 11 2008 AFF Championship	Australia	7–0	Philippines	Ho Chi Minh City
		Report		Stadium: Thanh Long Sports Centre

October 13 2008 AFF Championship	Thailand	12–0	Philippines	Ho Chi Minh City
		Report		Stadium: Thanh Long Sports Centre

=== 2009 ===
April 3 Friendly	Hong Kong	2–0	Philippines	Hong Kong

April 5 Friendly	Indonesia	1–0	Philippines	Hong Kong

== See also ==
- Philippines women's national football team results
- Philippines women's national football team results (1981–1999)
- Philippines women's national football team results (2010–2019)
- Philippines women's national football team results (2020–present)
