= 2004 AFF Women's Championship =

Tournament details
- Host country: Vietnam
- Dates: 30 September – 9 October
- Teams: 8 (from 1 confederation)

Final positions
- Champions: Myanmar (1st title)
- Runners-up: Vietnam B
- Third place: Vietnam
- Fourth place: Indonesia

Tournament statistics
- Matches played: 16
- Goals scored: 81 (5.06 per match)
- Top scorer: (Myanmar) Malar Win (9 goals)

The 2004 AFF Women's Championship was hosted by Vietnam. The inaugural tournament was held from 30 September to 9 October 2004.

Myanmar became the first nation to win the tournament by beating Vietnam in the final.

== Group stage ==
=== Group A ===
Team	Pld	W	D	L	GF	GA	GD	Pts
Myanmar	3	2	1	0	19	1	+18	7
Vietnam (H)	3	1	2	0	15	1	+14	5
Thailand U20	3	1	1	1	12	1	+11	4
Maldives	3	0	0	3	0	43	−43	0

(H) Hosts
1 October 2004

Myanmar	17–0	Maldives
Malar Win 4', 7', 15', 18', 51', 56'; Thet Thet Win 6'; Aye Nander 16', 43'; Tha Than 21', 61'; Zin Min War 32', 33', 42'; Thi Da Oo 64'; Khin Kyew 84', 90'	Report

1 October 2004

Vietnam	0–0	Thailand U20
	Report

3 October 2004

Myanmar	1–0	Thailand U20
Zin Mar Wann 4'	Report

4 October 2004

Vietnam	14–0	Maldives
Vũ Thị Ánh 4'; Nguyễn Thị Diệu Huyền 19', 30', 35', 38', 46', 61'; Võ Thị Thu Hà 29', 39'; Nguyễn Thị Hiền 58', 67'; Lê Thị Oanh 70', 80', 85'	Report

5 October 2004

Thailand U20	12–0	Maldives
Kitiya 9'; Supaporn 30'; Saranya 31', 38'; Hathairat 34'; Areesha 51' (o.g.); Orathai 51', 81'; Anootsara 65'; Pavinee 79'; Duangnapa 88'; Suchada 89'	Report

5 October 2004

Vietnam	1–1	Myanmar
Lê Thị Hiền 20'	Report	Malar Win 43'

=== Group B ===
Team	Pld	W	D	L	GF	GA	GD	Pts
Vietnam B (H)	3	3	0	0	12	0	+12	9
Indonesia	3	1	0	2	1	2	−1	3
Philippines	3	1	0	2	2	7	−5	3
Singapore	3	1	0	2	2	8	−6	3

(H) Hosts
30 September 2004

Indonesia	1–0	Philippines
Yuniggishi 8'	Report

30 September 2004

Vietnam B	6–0	Singapore
Đoàn Thị Kim Chi 34'; Trần Thị Kim Hồng 40'; Bùi Thị Tuyết Mai 58'; Văn Thị Thanh 65' (pen.), 72'; Vũ Thị Lành 80'	Report

2 October 2004

Vietnam B	1–0	Indonesia
Vũ Thị Lành 41'	Report

2 October 2004

Philippines	2–1	Singapore
Lazaro 5'; Agravante 46'	Report	Azreen Ma'at 6'

4 October 2004

Singapore	1–0	Indonesia
Lim S. 74'	Report

4 October 2004

Vietnam B	5–0	Philippines
Đỗ Hồng Tiến 17', 89'; Văn Thị Thanh 20'; Đoàn Thị Kim Chi 25'; Lưu Ngọc Mai ?'	Report

== Knockout stage ==
Semi-finals
7 October
Vietnam B	2
Vietnam	0
7 October
Myanmar	7
Indonesia	0

Final
9 October
Vietnam B	2 (2)
Myanmar (p)	2 (4)
Third Place
9 October
Vietnam	4
Indonesia	1

=== Semi-finals ===
7 October 2004

Myanmar	7–0	Indonesia
Aye Nander 21'; Than Than Htwe 23'; Nhin Si Myint 25', 38'; Malar Win 30'; Khin Htwe 50'; San San Waw 87'	Report

7 October 2004

Vietnam B	2–0	Vietnam
Đỗ Hồng Tiến ?', 63'	Report

=== Third place match ===
9 October 2004

Vietnam	4–1	Indonesia
Lê Thị Hiền 10', 55', 81'; Từ Thị Phụ 83'	Report	Tugiyati 30'

=== Final ===
9 October 2004

Vietnam B	2–2 (a.e.t.)	Myanmar
Văn Thị Thanh 7'; Bùi Thị Tuyết Mai 110'	Report	Malar Win 24'; Thet Thet Win 115'
Penalties
Nguyen Thi (penalty scored); Văn Thị Thanh (penalty scored) ? (penalty missed) ? (penalty missed)	2–4	(penalty scored) Aye Nander; (penalty scored) Moe Moe War; (penalty scored) Thet Thet Win; (penalty scored) San San Waw

== Awards ==
2004 AFF Women's Championship champions

Myanmar
First title

== Goalscorers ==
There were 81 goals scored in 16 matches, for an average of 5.06 goals per match.

9 goals

- (Myanmar) Malar Win

6 goals

- (Vietnam) Nguyễn Thị Diệu Huyền

4 goals

- (Vietnam) Đỗ Hồng Tiến
- (Vietnam) Lê Thị Hiền
- (Vietnam) Văn Thị Thanh

3 goals

- (Myanmar) Aye Nander
- (Myanmar) Zin Min War
- (Vietnam) Lê Thị Oanh

2 goals

- (Myanmar) Khin Kyew
- (Myanmar) Nhim Si Myint
- (Myanmar) Tha Than
- (Myanmar) Thet Thet Win
- (Thailand) Orathai Srimanee
- (Thailand) Saranya Kaewka
- (Vietnam) Bùi Thị Tuyết Mai
- (Vietnam) Đoàn Thị Kim Chi
- (Vietnam) Đỗ Hồng Tiến
- (Vietnam) Nguyễn Thị Hiền
- (Vietnam) Võ Thị Thu Hà
- (Vietnam) Vũ Thị Lành

1 goal

- (Indonesia) Tugiyati Cindy
- (Indonesia) Wiwin Yuniggishi
- (Myanmar) Khin Htwe
- (Myanmar) San San Waw
- (Myanmar) Thi Da Oo
- (Myanmar) Zin Mar Wann
- (Philippines) Edna Agravante
- (Philippines) Maria Lazaro
- (Singapore) Azreen Ma'at
- (Singapore) Lim Shiya
- (Thailand) Anootsara Maijarern
- (Thailand) Duangnapa Sritala
- (Thailand) Hathairat
- (Thailand) Kitiya Thiangtham
- (Thailand) Pavinee
- (Thailand) Suchada
- (Thailand) Supaporn Gaewbaen
- (Vietnam) Lê Thị Hiền
- (Vietnam) Lưu Ngọc Mai
- (Vietnam) Trần Thị Kim Hồng
- (Vietnam) Từ Thị Phụ
- (Vietnam) Vũ Thị Ánh

1 own goal

- (Maldives) Areesha (against Thailand)

== Final ranking ==
Pos	Team	Pld	W	D	L	GF	GA	GD	Pts	Final result
1	Myanmar	5	3	2	0	28	3	+25	11	Champions
2	Vietnam B (H)	5	4	1	0	16	2	+14	13	Runners-up
3	Vietnam (H)	5	2	2	1	19	4	+15	8	Third place
4	Indonesia	5	1	0	4	2	13	−11	3	Fourth place
5	Thailand U20	3	1	1	1	12	1	+11	4	Eliminated in group stage
6	Philippines	3	1	0	2	2	7	−5	3	Eliminated in group stage
7	Singapore	3	1	0	2	2	8	−6	3	Eliminated in group stage
8	Maldives	3	0	0	3	0	43	−43	0	Eliminated in group stage

(H) Hosts
