= 2010 AFC Women's Asian Cup qualification =

Tournament details
- Dates: 25 April – 3 May 2009 (first round); 4–14 July 2009 (second round)
- Teams: 12 (from 1 confederation)

Tournament statistics
- Matches played: 19
- Top scorer(s): (Jordan) Al-Naber (9 goals) (first round) (Vietnam) Đỗ Thị Ngọc Châm (5 goals) (second round)

The 2010 AFC Women's Championship qualification saw twelve nations attempt to qualify for the 2010 AFC Women's Asian Cup football competition. The three winners of the second round groups joined five automatic qualifiers in the finals tournament held in China in May 2010.

This tournament also served as the first stage of qualification for the 2011 FIFA Women's World Cup for the Asian zone.

== First round ==
The six lowest ranked teams played the first round. Myanmar, Chinese Taipei, Thailand, Iran, Vietnam and Hong Kong had a bye to the second round. Bangladesh withdrew before the start of qualification.

Team	Pld	W	D	L	GF	GA	GD	Pts
Jordan	4	3	1	0	23	3	+20	10
Uzbekistan	4	3	1	0	14	2	+12	10
Kyrgyzstan	4	2	0	2	7	10	−3	6
Palestine	4	1	0	3	5	14	−9	3
Maldives	4	0	0	4	0	20	−20	0

All matches were played in Kuala Lumpur, Malaysia.

25 April 2009
17:00 UTC+8

Kyrgyzstan	1–7	Jordan
Pokachalova 75'	Report	Al-Azab 1'; Al-Naber 11', 38'; Taalaibek 14' (o.g.); Jbarah 18', 36'; Jebreen 90+2'

KLFA Stadium, Kuala Lumpur
Attendance: 100
Referee: Kamnueng Pannipar (Thailand)

25 April 2009
19:30 UTC+8

Palestine	4–0	Maldives
Sohgian 40'; Hussein 45', 53'; Jorban 60'	Report

KLFA Stadium, Kuala Lumpur
Attendance: 100
Referee: Rita Gani (Malaysia)

27 April 2009
17:00 UTC+8

Maldives	0–5	Uzbekistan
	Report	Sarikova 7'; Usmanova 14'; Abdurasulova 28' (pen.), 31', 75'

KLFA Stadium, Kuala Lumpur
Attendance: 100
Referee: Shen Huangying (China)

27 April 2009
19:30 UTC+8

Palestine	1–4	Kyrgyzstan
Shaheen 90'	Report	Litvinenko 7', 53', 81'; Pokachalova 55'

KLFA Stadium, Kuala Lumpur
Attendance: 100
Referee: Ri Hyang Ok (Korea DPR)

29 April 2009
17:00 UTC+8

Uzbekistan	5–0	Palestine
Abdurasulova 10', 14', 85'; Sarikova 42'; Senina 74'	Report

KLFA Stadium, Kuala Lumpur
Attendance: 70
Referee: Shen Huangying (China)

29 April 2009
19:30 UTC+8

Jordan	9–0	Maldives
Al-Nahar 9', 26', 67'; Jbarah 15', 27'; Al-Naber 52', 60', 71' (pen.), 90+2'	Report

KLFA Stadium, Kuala Lumpur
Attendance: 70
Referee: Kamnueng Pannipar (Thailand)

1 May 2009
17:00 UTC+8

Jordan	5–0	Palestine
Al-Naber 24', 50'; Jbarah 35', 42'; Al-Azab 44'	Report

KLFA Stadium, Kuala Lumpur
Attendance: 60
Referee: Rita Gani (Malaysia)

1 May 2009
19:30 UTC+8

Kyrgyzstan	0–2	Uzbekistan
	Report	Usmanova 75'; Abdurasulova 90+2'

KLFA Stadium, Kuala Lumpur
Attendance: 60
Referee: Shen Huangying (China)

3 May 2009
17:00 UTC+8

Maldives	0–2	Kyrgyzstan
	Report	Pokachalova 8', 90+1'

KLFA Stadium, Kuala Lumpur
Attendance: 70
Referee: Rita Gani (Malaysia)

3 May 2009
19:30 UTC+8

Uzbekistan	2–2	Jordan
Turapova 24'; Sarikova 56'	Report	Al-Naber 31' (pen.); Jbarah 74'

KLFA Stadium, Kuala Lumpur
Attendance: 100
Referee: Kamnueng Pannipar (Thailand)

== Second round ==
=== Group A ===
All matches were played in Hsinying City, Chinese Taipei.

Team	Pld	W	D	L	GF	GA	GD	Pts
Myanmar	2	2	0	0	8	2	+6	6
Jordan	2	1	0	1	1	3	−2	3
Chinese Taipei (H)	2	0	0	2	2	6	−4	0

10 July 2009
15:30 UTC+8

Jordan	1–0	Chinese Taipei
Jebreen 74'	Report

Tainan County Stadium, Hsinying City
Attendance: 500
Referee: Semaksuk Praew (Thailand)

12 July 2009
15:30 UTC+8

Myanmar	3–0	Jordan
Khin Marlar Tun 18'; Than Than Htwe 33'; Myint Myint Aye 57'	Report

Tainan County Stadium, Hsinying City
Attendance: 200
Referee: Rita Gani (Malaysia)

14 July 2009
15:30 UTC+8

Chinese Taipei	2–5	Myanmar
Tsai Hsin-yun 21'; Lin Man-ting 68'	Report	Aye Nandar Hlaing 10'; My Nilar Htwe 34', 50', 76'; Khin Marlar Tun 48'

Tainan County Stadium, Hsinying City
Attendance: 600
Referee: Semaksuk Praew (Thailand)

=== Group B ===
All matches were played in Bangkok, Thailand.

Team	Pld	W	D	L	GF	GA	GD	Pts
Thailand (H)	2	2	0	0	14	2	+12	6
Uzbekistan	2	1	0	1	5	7	−2	3
Iran	2	0	0	2	2	12	−10	0

4 July 2009
17:00 UTC+7

Uzbekistan	1–6	Thailand
Abdurasulova 15'	Report	Anootsara 9', 77'; Nisa 57', 64'; Junpen 89', 90+1'

Rajamangala Stadium, Bangkok
Attendance: 200
Referee: Sachiko Yamagichi (Japan)

6 July 2009
17:00 UTC+7

Iran	1–4	Uzbekistan
Karimi 51'	Report	Abdurasulova 8'; Juraeva 70'; Usmanova 76' 78'

Rajamangala Stadium, Bangkok
Attendance: 70
Referee: Bentla D'Coth (India)

8 July 2009
17:00 UTC+7

Thailand	8–1	Iran
Chidtawan 14'; Nisa 21', 49', 63'; Anootsara 37', 42'; Junpen 70'; Sukunya 90+2'	Report	Karimi 45+1'

Rajamangala Stadium, Bangkok
Attendance: 300
Referee: Sachiko Yamagichi (Japan)

=== Group C ===
All matches were played in Ho Chi Minh City, Vietnam.

Team	Pld	W	D	L	GF	GA	GD	Pts
Vietnam (H)	2	2	0	0	17	1	+16	6
Hong Kong	2	1	0	1	2	7	−5	3
Kyrgyzstan	2	0	0	2	1	12	−11	0

4 July 2009
15:30 UTC+7

Kyrgyzstan	1–10	Vietnam
Pokachalova 78' (pen.)	Report	Đoàn Thị Kim Chi 10'; Đỗ Thị Ngọc Châm 21', 24', 57', 62', 72', 87'; Nguyễn Thị Nga 28'; Nguyễn Thị Minh Nguyệt 59'; Lê Thị Oanh 83'

Thành Long Sports Centre, Ho Chi Minh City
Attendance: 500
Referee: Hong Eun-Ah (Korea Republic)

6 July 2009
15:30 UTC+7

Hong Kong	2–0	Kyrgyzstan
Fung 48'; Ng Wing Kum 50'	Report

Thành Long Sports Centre, Ho Chi Minh City
Attendance: 150
Referee: Li Hong (China)

8 July 2009
15:30 UTC+7

Vietnam	7–0	Hong Kong
Văn Thị Thanh 9', 23'; Đỗ Thị Ngọc Châm 11', 39', 70'; Đoàn Thị Kim Chi 56'; Nguyễn Thị Muôn 80'	Report

Thành Long Sports Centre, Ho Chi Minh City
Attendance: 800
Referee: Hong Eun-Ah (Korea Republic)
