= Phùng Thị Minh Nguyệt =

Vietnamese footballer (born 1977)

Phùng Thị Minh Nguyệt (born 1977 in Hanoi) is a Vietnamese footballer who played as a midfielder or striker.

== Early life ==
Minh Nguyệt attended Hanoi National University of Education in Vietnam and was formed to become a teacher.

== Career ==
Minh Nguyệt was regarded as one of the most important players of the Vietnam women's national football team during the early years of the 2000s.

== International goals ==
No.	Date	Venue	Opponent	Score	Result	Competition
1.	26 July 1997	Kuala Lumpur, Malaysia	Myanmar	1–0	3–1	Toh Puan Datuk Seri Saadiah Sardon Trophy
2.	27 July 1997	Kuala Lumpur, Malaysia	Singapore	1–0	5–0	Toh Puan Datuk Seri Saadiah Sardon Trophy
3.	29 July 1997	Kuala Lumpur, Malaysia	Malaysia	1–0	1–0	Toh Puan Datuk Seri Saadiah Sardon Trophy
4.	7 August 2001	Lisarow, Australia	Singapore	2–0	6–0	2001 Central Coast Women's Tournament
5.	11 August 2001	Gosford, Australia	Singapore	1–0	4–0	2001 Central Coast Women's Tournament

== Style of play ==
Minh Nguyệt has been described as having a "good use of her ability to pressure and create walls for her teammates".
