= Văn Thị Thanh =

Vietnamese football player and manager

Personal information
- Date of birth: 27 August 1985 (age 41)
- Place of birth: Lý Nhân, Hà Nam, Vietnam
- Height: 1.58 m (5 ft 2 in)
- Position: Midfielder

Senior career*
Years	Team	Apps	(Gls)
2001–2011	Phong Phú Hà Nam	72	(38)

International career^{‡}
2003–2009	Vietnam	58	(23)
- * Club domestic league appearances and goals ‡ National team caps and goals as of 24 March 2008

Văn Thị Thanh (born 27 August 1985) is a Vietnamese football manager and former player who played as a midfielder. She has been a member of the Vietnam women's national team.

== International career ==
Thanh made her senior debut for Vietnam in 2003. She capped during two AFC Women's Asian Cup qualifications (2008 and 2010).

=== International goals ===
Scores and results list Vietnam's goal tally first

No.	Date	Venue	Opponent	Score	Result	Competition
1.	2 December 2003	Hải Phòng, Vietnam	Indonesia	5–0	6–0	2003 Southeast Asian Games
2.	4 December 2003	Hải Phòng, Vietnam	Malaysia	1–0	3–1	2003 Southeast Asian Games
3.	11 December 2003	Hải Phòng, Vietnam	Myanmar	1–0	2–1	2003 Southeast Asian Games
4.	30 September 2004	Hồ Chí Minh City, Vietnam	Singapore	4–0	6–0	2004 AFF Women's Championship
5.	30 September 2004	Hồ Chí Minh City, Vietnam	Singapore	5–0	6–0	2004 AFF Women's Championship
6.	4 October 2004	Hồ Chí Minh City, Vietnam	Philippines	2–0	5–0	2004 AFF Women's Championship
7.	9 October 2004	Hồ Chí Minh City, Vietnam	Myanmar	1–0	2–2 (a.e.t.) (2–4 p)	2004 AFF Women's Championship
8.	13 November 2004	Cẩm Phả, Vietnam	Hong Kong	3–0	3–0	Friendly
9.	7 October 2005	Cẩm Phả, Vietnam	India	1–0	2–1	Friendly
10.	7 October 2005	Cẩm Phả, Vietnam	India	2–1	2–1	Friendly
11.	10 October 2005	Cẩm Phả, Vietnam	Chinese Taipei	1–0	2–0	Friendly
12.	28 November 2005	Marikina, Philippines	Philippines	5–1	5–1	2005 Southeast Asian Games
13.	30 November 2005	Marikina, Philippines	Indonesia	1–0	8–0	2005 Southeast Asian Games
14.	30 November 2005	Marikina, Philippines	Indonesia	3–0	8–0	2005 Southeast Asian Games
15.	3 December 2005	Marikina, Philippines	Myanmar	1–0	1–0	2005 Southeast Asian Games
16.	21 February 2007	Bangkok, Thailand	Maldives	1–0	5–0	2008 Summer Olympics qualification
17.	7 September 2007	Yangon, Myanmar	Philippines	2–0	9–0	2007 AFF Women's Championship
18.	24 March 2008	Hồ Chí Minh City, Vietnam	Iran	1–0	4–1	2008 AFC Women's Asian Cup qualification
19.	12 October 2008	Hồ Chí Minh City, Vietnam	Malaysia	5–0	11–0	2008 AFF Women's Championship
20.	8 July 2009	Hồ Chí Minh City, Vietnam	Hong Kong	1–0	7–0	2010 AFC Women's Asian Cup qualification
21.	8 July 2009	Hồ Chí Minh City, Vietnam	Hong Kong	3–0	7–0	2010 AFC Women's Asian Cup qualification
22.	17 October 2009	Cẩm Phả, Vietnam	Laos	3–0	5–0	Friendly
23.	6 December 2009	Vientiane, Laos	Malaysia	7–0	8–0	2009 Southeast Asian Games
24.	11 December 2009	Vientiane, Laos	Thailand	2–0	2–2	2009 Southeast Asian Games
