= Nguyễn Thị Hòa =

Vietnamese footballer

Personal information
- Date of birth: 27 July 1990 (age 36)
- Place of birth: Thanh Oai, Hanoi, Vietnam
- Height: 1.65 m (5 ft 5 in)
- Position: Forward

Team information
- Current team: Hà Nội I
- Number: 14

Senior career*
Years	Team	Apps	(Gls)
2009–	Hà Nội I	51	(12)

International career^{‡}
2014–	Vietnam	23	(22)
- * Club domestic league appearances and goals ‡ National team caps and goals as of 10:12, 22 March 2015 (UTC)

Nguyễn Thị Hòa (born 27 July 1990) is a Vietnamese women's international footballer who plays as a forward for Hà Nội I. She is a member of the Vietnam women's national football team. She was part of the team at the 2014 AFC Women's Asian Cup.

== International goals ==
No.	Date	Venue	Opponent	Score	Result	Competition
1.	18 November 2010	Huangpu Sports Center, Guangzhou, China	Jordan	1–0	3–0	2010 Asian Games
2.	18 November 2010	Huangpu Sports Center, Guangzhou, China	Jordan	3–0	3–0	2010 Asian Games
3.	25 March 2011	Kaohsiung National Stadium, Kaohsiung, Taiwan	Thailand	1–1	1–2	2012 Summer Olympics qualifying
4.	27 March 2011	Kaohsiung National Stadium, Kaohsiung, Taiwan	Chinese Taipei	1–0	1–1	2012 Summer Olympics qualifying
5.	7 June 2011	Amman International Stadium, Amman, Jordan	Jordan	1–0	1–0	2012 Summer Olympics qualifying
6.	16 October 2011	New Laos National Stadium, Vientiane, Laos	Singapore	2–0	9–1	2011 AFF Women's Championship
7.	16 October 2011	New Laos National Stadium, Vientiane, Laos	Singapore	4–1	9–1	2011 AFF Women's Championship
8.	16 October 2011	New Laos National Stadium, Vientiane, Laos	Singapore	6–1	9–1	2011 AFF Women's Championship
9.	16 October 2011	New Laos National Stadium, Vientiane, Laos	Singapore	8–1	9–1	2011 AFF Women's Championship
10.	18 October 2011	New Laos National Stadium, Vientiane, Laos	Laos	2–0	4–0	2011 AFF Women's Championship
11.	18 October 2011	New Laos National Stadium, Vientiane, Laos	Laos	3–0	4–0	2011 AFF Women's Championship
12.	18 October 2011	New Laos National Stadium, Vientiane, Laos	Laos	4–0	4–0	2011 AFF Women's Championship
13.	25 October 2011	New Laos National Stadium, Vientiane, Laos	Laos	4–0	6–0	2011 AFF Women's Championship
14.	25 October 2011	New Laos National Stadium, Vientiane, Laos	Laos	6–0	6–0	2011 AFF Women's Championship
15.	13 September 2012	Thống Nhất Stadium, Ho Chi Minh City, Vietnam	Singapore	2–0	10–0	2012 AFF Women's Championship
16.	20 September 2012	Thống Nhất Stadium, Ho Chi Minh City, Vietnam	Laos	5–0	7–0	2012 AFF Women's Championship
17.	20 September 2012	Thống Nhất Stadium, Ho Chi Minh City, Vietnam	Laos	6–0	7–0	2012 AFF Women's Championship
18.	26 May 2013	Bahrain National Stadium, Riffa, Bahrain	Hong Kong	2–0	4–0	2014 AFC Women's Asian Cup qualification
19.	28 June 2016	Mandalarthiri Stadium, Mandalay, Myanmar	Philippines	1–0	4–0	2016 AFF Women's Championship
20.	5 April 2017	Vietnam YFT Center, Hanoi, Vietnam	Syria	5–0	11–0	2018 AFC Women's Asian Cup qualification
21.	5 April 2017	Vietnam YFT Center, Hanoi, Vietnam	Syria	11–0	11–0	2018 AFC Women's Asian Cup qualification
22.	9 April 2017	Vietnam YFT Center, Hanoi, Vietnam	Iran	4–1	6–1	2018 AFC Women's Asian Cup qualification
