= Lê Thị Thương =

Vietnamese footballer

Personal information
- Date of birth: September 21, 1991 (age 35)
- Place of birth: Hạ Long, Quảng Ninh, Vietnam
- Height: 1.59 m (5 ft 3 in)
- Position: Midfielder

Team information
- Current team: Than Khoáng Sản
- Number: 23

Senior career*
Years	Team	Apps	(Gls)
2005–	Than Khoáng Sản	51	(12)

International career^{‡}
2009–	Vietnam	8	(0)
- * Club domestic league appearances and goals ‡ National team caps and goals as of 18:16, 22 March 2015 (UTC)

Lê Thị Thương (born 21 September 1991) is a Vietnamese footballer who plays as a midfielder in club Than Khoáng Sản. Playing for the Vietnam women's national football team, she won the 2012 AFF Women's Championship. She also received the Vietnamese Silver Ball for women player twice in 2011 and 2012.

== International goals ==
No.	Date	Venue	Opponent	Score	Result	Competition
1.	7 September 2007	Thuwunna Stadium, Yangon, Myanmar	Philippines	?–0	9–0	2007 AFF Women's Championship
2.	7 September 2007	Thuwunna Stadium, Yangon, Myanmar	Philippines	?–0	9–0	2007 AFF Women's Championship
3.	12 October 2008	Thanh Long Sports Centre, Ho Chi Minh City, Vietnam	Malaysia	6–0	11–0	2008 AFF Women's Championship
4.	12 October 2008	Thanh Long Sports Centre, Ho Chi Minh City, Vietnam	Malaysia	7–0	11–0	2008 AFF Women's Championship
5.	16 October 2008	Thanh Long Sports Centre, Ho Chi Minh City, Vietnam	Laos	4–0	6–0	2008 AFF Women's Championship
6.	12 June 2011	King Abdullah Stadium, Amman, Jordan	Thailand	1–0	3–3	2012 Summer Olympics qualification
7.	16 October 2011	New Laos National Stadium, Vientiane, Laos	Singapore	5–1	9–1	2011 AFF Women's Championship
8.	23 October 2011	New Laos National Stadium, Vientiane, Laos	Myanmar	1–0	1–2	2011 AFF Women's Championship
9.	25 October 2013	New Laos National Stadium, Vientiane, Laos	Laos	1–0	6–0	2011 AFF Women's Championship
10.	13 September 2013	Thuwunna Stadium, Yangon, Myanmar	Malaysia	1–0	1–0	2013 AFF Women's Championship
11.	15 September 2013	Thuwunna Stadium, Yangon, Myanmar	Jordan	1–0	4–0	2013 AFF Women's Championship
