= Nguyễn Thị Nguyệt =

Vietnamese footballer

Personal information
- Date of birth: 5 November 1992 (age 34)
- Place of birth: Lý Nhân, Hà Nam, Vietnam
- Height: 1.60 m (5 ft 3 in)
- Position: Forward

Team information
- Current team: Phong Phú Hà Nam
- Number: 11

Senior career*
Years	Team	Apps	(Gls)
2009–	Phong Phú Hà Nam	153	(92)

International career^{‡}
2011–2013	Vietnam U20	3	(0)
2013–	Vietnam	19	(5)
- * Club domestic league appearances and goals ‡ National team caps and goals as of 09:32, 23 May 2015 (UTC)

Nguyễn Thị Nguyệt (born 5 November 1992) is a Vietnamese footballer who plays as a forward.

== International goals ==
No.	Date	Venue	Opponent	Score	Result	Competition
1.	16 May 2013	Amman, Jordan	Jordan	4–0	5–1	Friendly
2.	4 May 2015	Thống Nhất Stadium, Ho Chi Minh City, Vietnam	Malaysia	3–0	7–0	2015 AFF Women's Championship
3.	30 July 2016	Mandalarthiri Stadium, Mandalay, Myanmar	Thailand	2–0	2–0	2016 AFF Women's Championship
4.	5 April 2017	Vietnam YTF Center, Hanoi, Vietnam	Syria	4–0	11–0	2018 AFC Women's Asian Cup qualification
5.	7 April 2017	Vietnam YTF Center, Hanoi, Vietnam	Singapore	8–0	8–0	2018 AFC Women's Asian Cup qualification

== Vietnam U20 ==
#	Date	Venue	Opponent	Score	Result	Competition
1.	6 October 2011	Ho Chi Minh City, Thong Nhat Stadium	Australia	1-0	3-4	2011 AFC U-19 Women's Championship
2.	6 October 2011	Ho Chi Minh City, Thong Nhat Stadium	Australia	3-1	3-4	2011 AFC U-19 Women's Championship
