= Edna Agravante =

Philippine footballer (born 1980)

Personal information
- Date of birth: 13 September 1980 (age 46)
- Place of birth: Naga, Camarines Sur, Philippines
- Position: Striker

International career
Years	Team	Apps	(Gls)
c. 2001–2008	Philippines	~6	(2)

Edna Agravante (born September 13, 1980 in Naga, Camarines Sur, Philippines) is a former Philippine international footballer who played as a striker.

She played at the 2003 AFC Women's Championship in the 0–15 defeat against Japan. She was also named as part of the squad at the 2008 AFC Women's Asian Cup qualifiers.

== Career statistics ==
=== International goals ===
Scores and results list the Philippines' goal tally first.

#	Date	Venue	Opponent	Score	Result	Competition
1.	2 October 2004	(Vietnam)	Singapore	2–1	2–1	2004 AFF Women's Championship
2.	3 December 2007	Municipality of Tumbon Mueangpug Stadium, Nakhon Ratchasima	Laos	2–1	2–2	2007 Southeast Asian Games
