= Lim Shiya =

Singaporean footballer

Personal information
- Full name: Lim Shiya
- Date of birth: June 26, 1986 (age 40)
- Place of birth: Singapore
- Height: 1.68 m (5 ft 6 in)
- Position: Left wing

Team information
- Current team: Arion Women
- Number: 19

Senior career*
Years	Team	Apps	(Gls)
2001–2002	Home United		
2003–2004	FAS Young Women		
2005	Home United		
2006–2008	Arion Women		
2008–2009	Perth Glory		
2009–	Arion Women		

International career^{‡}
- Singapore
- * Club domestic league appearances and goals as of 18 February 2009 ‡ National team caps and goals as of 18 February 2009

Lim Shiya (born 26 June 1986) is a Singaporean footballer who formerly played as a midfielder for Australian W-League team Perth Glory and the Singapore women's national football team.

== Club career ==
Lim made her team debut for Home United FC (Women's Team) in the FAS Women's Challenge Cup 2001 at the age of 15 and played for FAS Young Women in 2003 before moving to Arion Women's Football Club, the Singapore's first all-women football club in 2006. A left-footed attacking midfielder who possessed good pace and dribbling skills, Shiya was known for her vision, technique and passing. She was also a regular goal scorer for her club.

In 2008, Lim joined Australian W-League team Perth Glory and became the first Singaporean woman national footballer to play professionally. She played for Perth Glory till 2009.

== International career ==
Lim made her debut for the Singapore Women's National Team on 18 April 2004, coming off the bench against Hong Kong in the AFC Beijing Olympics Qualifiers 2004 held at Hiroshima Big Arch Stadium in Osaka, Japan.

Lim has represented Singapore in AFC U19 Women's Championship 2004 (China) and 2006 (Jordan), AFF Women's Championship 2004 (Vietnam), FIFA Women's U19 World Cup International Friendly 2004 (Thailand), AFC Beijing Olympics Qualifiers 2004 (Japan) and AFC Women's Asian Cup Qualifiers 2008 (Malaysia).
