= Đỗ Thị Ngọc Châm =

Vietnamese footballer

Personal information
- Full name: Đỗ Thị Ngọc Châm
- Date of birth: Gia Lâm, Hanoi, Vietnam
- Place of birth: 23 September 1985 (age 41)
- Height: 1.62 m (5 ft 4 in)
- Position: Forward

Senior career*
| Years | Team | Apps | (Gls) |
| 1998–2016 | Hà Tây | 152 | (94) |

International career^{‡}
| 2002–2014 | Vietnam | 86 | (49) |
- * Club domestic league appearances and goals ‡ National team caps and goals as of 8 July 2009.

Đỗ Thị Ngọc Châm (born 23 September 1985) is a Vietnamese former association football player who played as a forward. She has been a member of the Vietnam women's national team.

Châm capped for Vietnam at senior level during two AFC Women's Asian Cup qualifiers (2008 and 2010).

== International goals ==
Scores and results list Vietnam's goal tally first

| No. | Date | Venue | Opponent | Score | Result | Competition |
|---|---|---|---|---|---|---|
| 1. | 19 June 2005 | Mỹ Đình National Stadium, Hanoi, Vietnam | Hong Kong | 3–0 | 4–1 | 2006 AFC Women's Asian Cup qualification |
| 2. | 12 August 2007 | Cheongju Stadium, Cheongju, South Korea | South Korea | 1–1 | 1–2 | 2008 Summer Olympics qualification |
| 3. | 7 September 2007 | Thuwunna Stadium, Yangon, Myanmar | Philippines | ?–0 | 9–0 | 2007 AFF Women's Championship |
| 4. | 7 September 2007 | Thuwunna Stadium, Yangon, Myanmar | Philippines | ?–0 | 9–0 | 2007 AFF Women's Championship |
| 5. | 7 September 2007 | Thuwunna Stadium, Yangon, Myanmar | Philippines | ?–0 | 9–0 | 2007 AFF Women's Championship |
| 6. | 9 September 2007 | Thuwunna Stadium, Yangon, Myanmar | Malaysia | 3–0 | 9–0 | 2007 AFF Women's Championship |
| 7. | 9 September 2007 | Thuwunna Stadium, Yangon, Myanmar | Malaysia | 4–0 | 9–0 | 2007 AFF Women's Championship |
| 8. | 9 September 2007 | Thuwunna Stadium, Yangon, Myanmar | Malaysia | 5–0 | 9–0 | 2007 AFF Women's Championship |
| 9. | 9 September 2007 | Thuwunna Stadium, Yangon, Myanmar | Malaysia | ?–0 | 9–0 | 2007 AFF Women's Championship |
| 10. | 9 September 2007 | Thuwunna Stadium, Yangon, Myanmar | Malaysia | ?–0 | 9–0 | 2007 AFF Women's Championship |
| 11. | 15 September 2007 | Thuwunna Stadium, Yangon, Myanmar | Malaysia | 1–0 | 6–0 | 2007 AFF Women's Championship |
| 12. | 15 December 2007 | Municipality of Tumbon Mueangpug Stadium, Nakhon Ratchasima, Thailand | Philippines | 1–0 | 10–0 | 2007 Southeast Asian Games |
| 13. | 15 December 2007 | Municipality of Tumbon Mueangpug Stadium, Nakhon Ratchasima, Thailand | Philippines | 3–0 | 10–0 | 2007 Southeast Asian Games |
| 14. | 15 December 2007 | Municipality of Tumbon Mueangpug Stadium, Nakhon Ratchasima, Thailand | Philippines | 5–0 | 10–0 | 2007 Southeast Asian Games |
| 15. | 15 December 2007 | Municipality of Tumbon Mueangpug Stadium, Nakhon Ratchasima, Thailand | Philippines | 6–0 | 10–0 | 2007 Southeast Asian Games |
| 16. | 24 March 2008 | Thanh Long Sports Centre, Ho Chi Minh City, Vietnam | Iran | 2–0 | 4–1 | 2008 AFC Women's Asian Cup qualification |
| 17. | 24 March 2008 | Thanh Long Sports Centre, Ho Chi Minh City, Vietnam | Iran | 3–0 | 4–1 | 2008 AFC Women's Asian Cup qualification |
| 18. | 26 March 2008 | Thanh Long Sports Centre, Ho Chi Minh City, Vietnam | Chinese Taipei | 1–0 | 3–1 | 2008 AFC Women's Asian Cup qualification |
| 19. | 26 March 2008 | Thanh Long Sports Centre, Ho Chi Minh City, Vietnam | Chinese Taipei | 2–1 | 3–1 | 2008 AFC Women's Asian Cup qualification |
| 20. | 28 March 2008 | Thanh Long Sports Centre, Ho Chi Minh City, Vietnam | Myanmar | 1–0 | 1–0 | 2008 AFC Women's Asian Cup qualification |
| 21. | 8 October 2008 | Thanh Long Sports Centre, Ho Chi Minh City, Vietnam | Myanmar | 1–0 | 3–1 | 2008 AFF Women's Championship |
| 22. | 8 October 2008 | Thanh Long Sports Centre, Ho Chi Minh City, Vietnam | Myanmar | 2–0 | 3–1 | 2008 AFF Women's Championship |
| 23. | 12 October 2008 | Thanh Long Sports Centre, Ho Chi Minh City, Vietnam | Malaysia | 1–0 | 11–0 | 2008 AFF Women's Championship |
| 24. | 12 October 2008 | Thanh Long Sports Centre, Ho Chi Minh City, Vietnam | Malaysia | 9–0 | 11–0 | 2008 AFF Women's Championship |
| 25. | 16 October 2008 | Thanh Long Sports Centre, Ho Chi Minh City, Vietnam | Laos | 3–0 | 6–0 | 2008 AFF Women's Championship |
| 26. | 28 June 2009 | Thanh Long Sports Centre, Ho Chi Minh City, Vietnam | Uzbekistan | 2–0 | 4–0 | Friendly |
| 27. | 28 June 2009 | Thanh Long Sports Centre, Ho Chi Minh City, Vietnam | Uzbekistan | 3–0 | 4–0 | Friendly |
| 28. | 4 July 2009 | Thanh Long Sports Centre, Ho Chi Minh City, Vietnam | Kyrgyzstan | 2–0 | 10–1 | 2010 AFC Women's Asian Cup qualification |
| 29. | 4 July 2009 | Thanh Long Sports Centre, Ho Chi Minh City, Vietnam | Kyrgyzstan | 3–0 | 10–1 | 2010 AFC Women's Asian Cup qualification |
| 30. | 4 July 2009 | Thanh Long Sports Centre, Ho Chi Minh City, Vietnam | Kyrgyzstan | 5–0 | 10–1 | 2010 AFC Women's Asian Cup qualification |
| 31. | 4 July 2009 | Thanh Long Sports Centre, Ho Chi Minh City, Vietnam | Kyrgyzstan | 7–0 | 10–1 | 2010 AFC Women's Asian Cup qualification |
| 32. | 4 July 2009 | Thanh Long Sports Centre, Ho Chi Minh City, Vietnam | Kyrgyzstan | 8–0 | 10–1 | 2010 AFC Women's Asian Cup qualification |
| 33. | 4 July 2009 | Thanh Long Sports Centre, Ho Chi Minh City, Vietnam | Kyrgyzstan | 10–1 | 10–1 | 2010 AFC Women's Asian Cup qualification |
| 34. | 8 July 2009 | Thanh Long Sports Centre, Ho Chi Minh City, Vietnam | Hong Kong | 2–0 | 7–0 | 2010 AFC Women's Asian Cup qualification |
| 35. | 8 July 2009 | Thanh Long Sports Centre, Ho Chi Minh City, Vietnam | Hong Kong | 4–0 | 7–0 | 2010 AFC Women's Asian Cup qualification |
| 36. | 8 July 2009 | Thanh Long Sports Centre, Ho Chi Minh City, Vietnam | Hong Kong | 6–0 | 7–0 | 2010 AFC Women's Asian Cup qualification |
| 37. | 17 October 2009 | Cửa Ông Stadium, Cẩm Phả, Vietnam | Laos | 4–0 | 5–0 | Friendly |
| 38. | 17 October 2009 | Cửa Ông Stadium, Cẩm Phả, Vietnam | Laos | 5–0 | 5–0 | Friendly |
| 39. | 23 October 2009 | Cửa Ông Stadium, Cẩm Phả, Vietnam | Thailand | 1–0 | 2–0 | Friendly |
| 40. | 23 October 2009 | Cửa Ông Stadium, Cẩm Phả, Vietnam | Thailand | 2–0 | 2–0 | Friendly |
