= Nguyễn Thị Minh Nguyệt =

Vietnamese footballer

Personal information
- Date of birth: November 16, 1986 (age 40)
- Place of birth: Phú Xuyên, Hanoi, Vietnam
- Height: 1.54 m (5 ft 1 in)
- Position: Forward

Senior career*
Years	Team	Apps	(Gls)
2004–2018	Hà Nội I	79	(20)

International career^{‡}
2004–2016	Vietnam	93	(40)
- * Club domestic league appearances and goals ‡ National team caps and goals as of 10:14, 4 August 2016 (UTC)

Nguyễn Thị Minh Nguyệt (born 16 November 1986) is a retired Vietnamese soccer player who last played as a forward for Hà Nội FC and The Vietnam women's national football team.

== International goals ==
No.	Date	Venue	Opponent	Score	Result	Competition
1.	21 February 2007	Thai-Japanese Stadium, Bangkok, Thailand	Maldives	4–0	5–0	2008 Summer Olympics qualification
2.	1 November 2007	Cẩm Phả Stadium, Cẩm Phả, Vietnam	Laos	?–0	10–0	Friendly
3.	5 December 2007	Municipality of Tumbon Mueangpug Stadium, Nakhon Ratchasima, Thailand	Philippines	8–0	10–0	2007 Southeast Asian Games
4.	5 December 2007	Municipality of Tumbon Mueangpug Stadium, Nakhon Ratchasima, Thailand	Philippines	9–0	10–0	2007 Southeast Asian Games
5.	8 December 2007	Municipality of Tumbon Mueangpug Stadium, Nakhon Ratchasima, Thailand	Laos	4–1	4–1	2007 Southeast Asian Games
6.	10 December 2007	Municipality of Tumbon Mueangpug Stadium, Nakhon Ratchasima, Thailand	Myanmar	2–1	2–1 (a.e.t.)	2007 Southeast Asian Games
7.	10 October 2008	Thành Long Sports Center, Hồ Chí Minh City, Vietnam	Indonesia	2–0	4–0	2008 AFF Women's Championship
8.	12 October 2008	Thành Long Sports Center, Hồ Chí Minh City, Vietnam	Malaysia	11–0	11–0	2008 AFF Women's Championship
9.	4 July 2009	Thành Long Sports Center, Hồ Chí Minh City, Vietnam	Kyrgyzstan	6–0	10–1	2010 AFC Women's Asian Cup qualification
10.	6 December 2009	National University of Laos Stadium, Vientiane, Laos	Malaysia	4–0	8–0	2009 SEA Games
11.	6 December 2009	National University of Laos Stadium, Vientiane, Laos	Malaysia	5–0	8–0	2009 SEA Games
12.	13 September 2012	Thống Nhất Stadium, Ho Chi Minh City, Vietnam	Singapore	6–0	10–0	2012 AFF Women's Championship
13.	13 September 2012	Thống Nhất Stadium, Ho Chi Minh City, Vietnam	Singapore	7–0	10–0	2012 AFF Women's Championship
14.	13 September 2012	Thống Nhất Stadium, Ho Chi Minh City, Vietnam	Singapore	9–0	10–0	2012 AFF Women's Championship
15.	20 September 2012	Thống Nhất Stadium, Ho Chi Minh City, Vietnam	Laos	1–0	7–0	2012 AFF Women's Championship
16.	20 September 2012	Thống Nhất Stadium, Ho Chi Minh City, Vietnam	Laos	4–0	7–0	2012 AFF Women's Championship
17.	22 September 2013	Thuwunna Stadium, Yangon, Myanmar	Myanmar	3–1	3–1	2013 AFF Women's Championship
18.	13 December 2013	Mandalarthiri Stadium, Mandalay, Myanmar	Philippines	2–0	7–0	2013 Southeast Asian Games
19.	13 December 2013	Mandalarthiri Stadium, Mandalay, Myanmar	Philippines	5–0	7–0	2013 Southeast Asian Games
20.	18 December 2013	Mandalarthiri Stadium, Mandalay, Myanmar	Malaysia	1–0	4–0	2013 Southeast Asian Games
21.	18 December 2013	Mandalarthiri Stadium, Mandalay, Myanmar	Malaysia	3–0	4–0	2013 Southeast Asian Games
22.	20 December 2013	Mandalarthiri Stadium, Mandalay, Myanmar	Thailand	1–0	1–2	2013 Southeast Asian Games
23.	23 September 2014	Incheon Namdong Asiad Rugby Field, Incheon, South Korea	Hong Kong	4–0	5–0	2014 Asian Games
24.	2 May 2015	Thống Nhất Stadium, Ho Chi Minh City, Vietnam	Myanmar	2–2	3–2	2015 AFF Women's Championship
25.	6 May 2015	Thống Nhất Stadium, Ho Chi Minh City, Vietnam	Philippines	1–0	4–0	2015 AFF Women's Championship
26.	6 May 2015	Thống Nhất Stadium, Ho Chi Minh City, Vietnam	Philippines	3–0	4–0	2015 AFF Women's Championship
27.	6 May 2015	Thống Nhất Stadium, Ho Chi Minh City, Vietnam	Philippines	4–0	4–0	2015 AFF Women's Championship
28.	18 September 2015	Mandalarthiri Stadium, Mandalay, Myanmar	Myanmar	2–0	4–2	2016 AFC Women's Olympic Qualifying Tournament
29.	18 September 2015	Mandalarthiri Stadium, Mandalay, Myanmar	Myanmar	3–0	4–2	2016 AFC Women's Olympic Qualifying Tournament
30.	20 September 2015	Mandalarthiri Stadium, Mandalay, Myanmar	Jordan	1–0	2–1	2016 AFC Women's Olympic Qualifying Tournament
31.	20 September 2015	Mandalarthiri Stadium, Mandalay, Myanmar	Jordan	2–0	2–1	2016 AFC Women's Olympic Qualifying Tournament
32.	24 September 2015	Mandalarthiri Stadium, Mandalay, Myanmar	Thailand	1–0	2–0	2016 AFC Women's Olympic Qualifying Tournament
33.	24 September 2015	Mandalarthiri Stadium, Mandalay, Myanmar	Thailand	2–0	2–0	2016 AFC Women's Olympic Qualifying Tournament
34.	26 July 2016	Mandalarthiri Stadium, Mandalay, Myanmar	Singapore	5–0	14–0	2016 AFF Women's Championship
35.	28 July 2016	Mandalarthiri Stadium, Mandalay, Myanmar	Philippines	4–0	4–0	2016 AFF Women's Championship
36.	2 August 2016	Mandalarthiri Stadium, Mandalay, Myanmar	Myanmar	3–3	3–3 (a.e.t.) (5–4 p)	2016 AFF Women's Championship
37.	4 August 2016	Mandalarthiri Stadium, Mandalay, Myanmar	Thailand	1–1	1–1 (a.e.t.) (5–6 p)	2016 AFF Women's Championship
