= Trần Thị Kim Hồng =

Vietnamese footballer

Personal information
- Date of birth: 26 January 1985 (age 41)
- Place of birth: Ho Chi Minh City, Vietnam
- Height: 1.53 m (5 ft 0 in)
- Position: Midfielder

Senior career*
Years	Team	Apps	(Gls)
2007–2021	Hồ Chí Minh City I	67	(1)

International career^{‡}
2010–2018	Vietnam	38	(2)
- * Club domestic league appearances and goals ‡ National team caps and goals as of 10:10, 22 March 2015 (UTC)

Trần Thị Kim Hồng (born 26 January 1985) is a Vietnamese footballer who plays as a midfielder.

== International goals ==
No.	Date	Venue	Opponent	Score	Result	Competition
1.	30 September 2004	Thành Long Sports Center, Hồ Chí Minh City, Vietnam	Singapore	2–0	6–0	2004 AFF Women's Championship
2.	5 December 2007	Municipality of Tumbon Mueangpug Stadium, Nakhon Ratchasima, Thailand	Philippines	7–0	10–0	2007 Southeast Asian Games
3.	16 October 2008	Thành Long Sports Center, Hồ Chí Minh City, Vietnam	Laos	6–0	6–0	2008 AFF Women's Championship
4.	18 October 2008	Thành Long Sports Center, Hồ Chí Minh City, Vietnam	Thailand	1–0	2–1	2008 AFF Women's Championship
5.	18 October 2008	Thành Long Sports Center, Hồ Chí Minh City, Vietnam	Thailand	2–0	2–1	2008 AFF Women's Championship
6.	6 December 2009	National University of Laos Stadium, Vientiane, Laos	Malaysia	3–0	8–0	2009 Southeast Asian Games
7.	13 December 2009	Chao Anouvong Stadium, Vientiane, Laos	Laos	1–0	3–0	2009 Southeast Asian Games
8.	13 December 2009	Chao Anouvong Stadium, Vientiane, Laos	Laos	2–0	3–0	2009 Southeast Asian Games
9.	20 March 2011	Kaohsiung National Stadium, Kaohsiung, Taiwan	Myanmar	2–0	2–0	2012 Summer Olympics qualification
10.	17 September 2012	Thống Nhất Stadium, Hồ Chí Minh City, Vietnam	Myanmar	1–0	2–1	2012 AFF Women's Championship
11.	22 May 2013	Bahrain National Stadium, Riffa, Bahrain	Bahrain	2–0	8–0	2014 AFC Women's Asian Cup qualification
12.	24 May 2013	Bahrain National Stadium, Riffa, Bahrain	Kyrgyzstan	9–0	12–0	2014 AFC Women's Asian Cup qualification
13.	26 May 2013	Bahrain National Stadium, Riffa, Bahrain	Hong Kong	4–0	4–0	2014 AFC Women's Asian Cup qualification
14.	22 September 2013	Thuwunna Stadium, Yangon, Myanmar	Myanmar	2–0	3–1	2013 AFF Women's Championship
15.	13 December 2013	Mandalarthiri Stadium, Mandalay, Myanmar	Philippines	3–0	7–0	2013 Southeast Asian Games
