= Supaporn Gaewbaen =

Thai footballer (born 1985)

Personal information
- Date of birth: 4 March 1985 (age 41)
- Place of birth: Surin, Thailand
- Position: Midfielder

Senior career*
Years	Team	Apps	(Gls)
- BG Bundit Asia

International career^{‡}
2014	Thailand	1+	(0+)
- * Club domestic league appearances and goals ‡ National team caps and goals as of 15 May 2014

Supaporn Gaewbaen (Thai: สุภาภรณ์ แก้วแบน; born 4 March 1985) is a Thai former footballer who played as a midfielder. She has been a member of the Thailand women's national team.

== International goals ==
No.	Date	Venue	Opponent	Score	Result	Competition
1.	7 December 2006	Al-Arabi Stadium, Doha, Qatar	Jordan	2–0	5–0	2006 Asian Games
2.	2 December 2007	Municipality of Tumbon Mueangpug Stadium, Nakhon Ratchasima, Thailand	Malaysia	5–0	6–0	2007 SEA Games
3.	10 December 2007	Municipality of Tumbon Mueangpug Stadium, Nakhon Ratchasima, Thailand	Laos	5–0	8–0	2007 SEA Games
4.	26 March 2008	80th Birthday Stadium, Nakhon Ratchasima, Thailand	Philippines	8–0	9–0	2008 AFC Women's Asian Cup qualification
5.	4 December 2009	National University of Laos Stadium, Vientiane, Laos	Malaysia	1–0	14–0	2009 Southeast Asian Games
6.	4 December 2009	National University of Laos Stadium, Vientiane, Laos	Malaysia	6–0	14–0	2009 Southeast Asian Games
7.	4 December 2009	National University of Laos Stadium, Vientiane, Laos	Malaysia	11–0	14–0	2009 Southeast Asian Games
8.	6 December 2009	National University of Laos Stadium, Vientiane, Laos	Myanmar	1–1	1–1	2009 Southeast Asian Games
