= Lê Thị Oanh =

Vietnamese footballer

Personal information
- Date of birth: 9 February 1984 (age 42)
- Position: Forward

Senior career*
Years	Team	Apps	(Gls)
1998–2016	Hà Tây	129	(62)

International career^{‡}
2002–2014	Vietnam	84	(32)
- * Club domestic league appearances and goals ‡ National team caps and goals as of 23 May 2010

Lê Thị Oanh (born 9 February 1984) is a Vietnamese former footballer who played as a forward. She has been a member of the Vietnam women's national team.
