= 2007 AFF Women's Championship =

Tournament details
- Host country: Myanmar
- City: Yangon
- Dates: 6–15 September
- Teams: 8 (from 1 confederation)
- Venue: 2 (in 1 host city)

Final positions
- Champions: Myanmar (2nd title)
- Runners-up: Thailand
- Third place: Vietnam
- Fourth place: Malaysia

Tournament statistics
- Matches played: 16
- Goals scored: 89 (5.56 per match)
- Top scorer(s): (Vietnam) Đỗ Thị Ngọc Châm (9 goals)
- Fair play award: Vietnam

The 2007 AFF Women's Championship was hosted by Myanmar and was held from 6 to 15 September 2007. The host defeated Thailand in the final to win their second title.

== Group stage ==
=== Group A ===
Team	Pld	W	D	L	GF	GA	GD	Pts
Vietnam	3	3	0	0	26	0	+26	9
Malaysia	3	2	0	1	4	10	−6	6
Indonesia	3	1	0	2	3	12	−9	3
Philippines	3	0	0	3	3	14	−11	0

7 September 2007
15:30

Malaysia	2–0	Indonesia
	Report

Thuwunna Stadium, Yangon
7 September 2007
17:45

Vietnam	9–0	Philippines
	Report

Thuwunna Stadium, Yangon

9 September 2007
15:30

Indonesia	3–2	Philippines
	Report

Thuwunna Stadium, Yangon
9 September 2007
17:45

Vietnam	9–0	Malaysia
	Report

Thuwunna Stadium, Yangon

11 September 2007
15:30

Philippines	1–2	Malaysia
	Report

Aung San Stadium, Yangon
11 September 2007
15:30

Indonesia	0–8	Vietnam
	Report

Thuwunna Stadium, Yangon

=== Group B ===
Team	Pld	W	D	L	GF	GA	GD	Pts
Myanmar (H)	3	3	0	0	11	0	+11	9
Thailand	3	2	0	1	21	2	+19	6
Laos	3	1	0	2	4	21	−17	3
Singapore	3	0	0	3	1	14	−13	0

(H) Hosts
6 September 2007
15:30

Singapore	0–3	Myanmar
	Report

Thuwunna Stadium, Yangon
6 September 2007
17:45

Thailand	13–1	Laos
	Report

Thuwunna Stadium, Yangon

8 September 2007
15:30

Thailand	8–0	Singapore
	Report

Thuwunna Stadium, Yangon
8 September 2007
17:45

Myanmar	7–0	Laos
	Report

Thuwunna Stadium, Yangon

10 September 2007
15:30

Laos	3–1	Singapore
	Report

Aung San Stadium, Yangon
10 September 2007
15:30

Myanmar	1–0	Thailand
	Report

Thuwunna Stadium, Yangon

== Knockout stage ==
Semi-finals
13 September – Yangon
Vietnam	0
Thailand	3
13 September – Yangon
Myanmar	5
Malaysia	0

Final
15 September – Yangon
Thailand	1 (1)
Myanmar (p)	1 (4)
Third Place
15 September – Yangon
Malaysia	0
Vietnam	6

=== Semi-finals ===
13 September 2007
15:30

Vietnam	0–3	Thailand
	Report

Thuwunna Stadium, Yangon
13 September 2007
17:45

Myanmar	5–0	Malaysia
	Report

Thuwunna Stadium, Yangon

=== Third place match ===
15 September 2007
15:00

Malaysia	0–6	Vietnam
	Report

Thuwunna Stadium, Yangon

=== Final ===
15 September 2007
17:45

Thailand	1–1 (a.e.t.)	Myanmar
	Report
Penalties
	1–4

Thuwunna Stadium, Yangon

== Awards ==
2007 AFF Women's Championship champions

Myanmar
Second title

.

== Final ranking ==
Pos	Team	Pld	W	D	L	GF	GA	GD	Pts	Final result
1	Myanmar (H)	5	4	1	0	17	1	+16	13	Champions
2	Thailand	5	3	1	1	25	3	+22	10	Runners-up
3	Vietnam	5	4	0	1	32	3	+29	12	Third place
4	Malaysia	5	2	0	3	4	21	−17	6	Fourth place
5	Indonesia	3	1	0	2	3	12	−9	3	Eliminated in group stage
6	Laos	3	1	0	2	4	21	−17	3	Eliminated in group stage
7	Philippines	3	0	0	3	3	14	−11	0	Eliminated in group stage
8	Singapore	3	0	0	3	1	14	−13	0	Eliminated in group stage

(H) Hosts
