= 2023 Pinatar Cup squads =

This article lists the squads for the 2023 Pinatar Cup, the third edition of the Pinatar Cup. The tournament will consist of a series of friendly matches to be held in Spain from 15 to 21 February 2023.

The age listed for each player is on 15 February 2023, the first day of the tournament. The numbers of caps and goals listed for each player do not include any matches played after the start of tournament. The club listed is the club for which the player last played a competitive match prior to the tournament. The nationality for each club reflects the national association (not the league) to which the club is affiliated. A flag is included for coaches that are of a different nationality than their own national team.

== Squads ==
=== Iceland ===
Coach: Þorsteinn Halldórsson

The final squad was announced on 3 February 2023. On 12 February 2023, Svava Rós Guðmundsdóttir withdrew from the squad and was replaced by Diljá Ýr Zomers.

No.	Pos.	Player	Date of birth (age)	Caps	Goals	Club
1	GK	Sandra Sigurðardóttir	2 October 1986 (aged 36)	48	0	(Football Association of Iceland) Valur
2	MF	Diljá Ýr Zomers	11 November 2001 (aged 21)	0	0	(Swedish Football Association) Häcken
3	DF	Elísa Viðarsdóttir	26 May 1991 (aged 31)	49	0	(Football Association of Iceland) Valur
4	DF	Glódís Perla Viggósdóttir	27 June 1995 (aged 27)	108	8	(German Football Association) Bayern Munich
5	MF	Gunnhildur Yrsa Jónsdóttir	28 September 1998 (aged 24)	96	14	(Football Association of Iceland) Stjarnan
6	DF	Ingibjörg Sigurðardóttir	7 October 1997 (aged 25)	49	0	(Norwegian Football Federation) Vålerenga
7	MF	Selma Sól Magnúsdóttir	23 April 1998 (aged 24)	21	3	(Norwegian Football Federation) Rosenborg
8	FW	Karólína Lea Vilhjálmsdóttir	8 August 2001 (aged 21)	22	8	(German Football Association) Bayern Munich
9	FW	Berglind Björg Þorvaldsdóttir	18 January 1992 (aged 31)	69	12	(French Football Federation) Paris Saint-Germain
10	MF	Dagný Brynjarsdóttir	10 October 1991 (aged 31)	108	37	(The Football Association) West Ham United
11	DF	Arna Ásgrímsdóttir	12 August 1992 (aged 30)	12	1	(Football Association of Iceland) Valur
12	GK	Telma Ívarsdóttir	30 March 1999 (aged 23)	1	0	(Football Association of Iceland) Breiðablik
13	GK	Cecilía Rán Rúnarsdóttir	26 July 2003 (aged 19)	8	0	(German Football Association) Bayern Munich
14	MF	Hlín Eiríksdóttir	12 June 2000 (aged 22)	20	3	(Swedish Football Association) Kristianstads
15	MF	Alexandra Jóhannsdóttir	19 March 2000 (aged 22)	29	3	(Italian Football Federation) Fiorentina
16	FW	Ólöf Sigríður Kristinsdóttir	22 May 2003 (aged 19)	0	0	(Football Association of Iceland) Þróttur Reykjavik
17	FW	Agla María Albertsdóttir	5 August 1999 (aged 23)	51	4	(Football Association of Iceland) Breiðablik
18	DF	Guðrún Arnardóttir	29 July 1995 (aged 27)	22	1	(Swedish Football Association) Rosengård
19	DF	Áslaug Munda Gunnlaugsdóttir	2 June 2001 (aged 21)	11	0	(Football Association of Iceland) Breiðablik
20	DF	Guðný Árnadóttir	4 August 2000 (aged 22)	19	0	(Italian Football Federation) Milan
21	MF	Hafrún Rakel Halldórsdóttir	1 October 2002 (aged 20)	4	0	(Football Association of Iceland) Breiðablik
22	MF	Amanda Andradóttir	18 December 2003 (aged 19)	9	0	(Swedish Football Association) Kristianstads
23	FW	Sveindís Jane Jónsdóttir	5 June 2001 (aged 21)	25	7	(German Football Association) VfL Wolfsburg

=== Philippines ===
Coach: (Australia) Alen Stajcic

The final squad was announced on 2 February 2023.

No.	Pos.	Player	Date of birth (age)	Caps	Goals	Club
1	GK	Inna Palacios	8 February 1994 (aged 29)	52	0	(Philippine Football Federation) Kaya–Iloilo
2	DF	Malea Cesar	9 December 2003 (aged 19)	23	1	(Football Australia) Blacktown City
3	DF	Dominique Randle	10 December 1994 (aged 28)	23	1	(United States Soccer Federation) USC Trojans
4	MF	Jaclyn Sawicki	14 November 1992 (aged 30)	12	0	(Football Australia) Western United
5	DF	Hali Long (captain)	21 January 1995 (aged 28)	64	16	(Philippine Football Federation) Kaya–Iloilo
6	MF	Tahnai Annis	20 June 1989 (aged 33)	31	13	(Football Association of Iceland) Þór/KA
7	MF	Camille Rodriguez	27 December 1994 (aged 28)	42	11	(Philippine Football Federation) Kaya–Iloilo
8	FW	Sarina Bolden	30 June 1996 (aged 26)	29	17	(Football Australia) Western Sydney Wanderers
9	FW	Isabella Flanigan	22 February 2005 (aged 17)	24	3	(United States Soccer Federation) West Virginia Mountaineers
10	DF	Reina Bonta	17 April 1999 (aged 23)	5	0	(United States Soccer Federation) Yale Bulldogs
11	MF	Anicka Castañeda	16 December 1999 (aged 23)	32	11	(Football Australia) Mt Druitt Town Rangers
12	MF	Kaya Hawkinson	17 April 2000 (aged 22)	12	1	(United States Soccer Federation) Cal State Fullerton Titans
13	MF	Meryll Serrano	20 July 1997 (aged 25)	3	1	(Norwegian Football Federation) Stabæk
14	MF	Sara Eggesvik	29 April 1997 (aged 25)	14	3	(Norwegian Football Federation) KIL/Hemne
15	MF	Carleigh Frilles	11 April 2002 (aged 20)	27	11	(United States Soccer Federation) VCU Rams
16	DF	Sofia Harrison	16 February 1999 (aged 23)	25	2	(German Football Association) Werder Bremen
17	DF	Alicia Barker	22 May 1998 (aged 24)	2	0	(United States Soccer Federation) Illinois Fighting Illini
18	DF	Jessika Cowart	30 October 1999 (aged 23)	14	2	(Swedish Football Association) Kalmar
19	DF	Eva Madarang	13 September 1997 (aged 25)	45	11	(Football Australia) Blacktown Spartans
20	FW	Quinley Quezada	7 April 1997 (aged 25)	39	20	(Football Association of Serbia) Red Star Belgrade
21	FW	Katrina Guillou	19 December 1993 (aged 29)	20	10	(Swedish Football Association) Piteå
22	GK	Kiara Fontanilla	1 July 2000 (aged 22)	5	0	(United States Soccer Federation) Westcliff Warriors
23	GK	Olivia McDaniel	14 October 1997 (aged 25)	21	0	(United States Soccer Federation) Milwaukee Panthers
24	DF	Maya Alcantara	22 July 2000 (aged 22)	4	0	(United States Soccer Federation) Georgetown Hoyas
25	MF	Reinna Gabriel	29 October 2003 (aged 19)	0	0	(United States Soccer Federation) Cornell Big Red

=== Scotland ===
Coach: (Spain) Pedro Martínez Losa

The final squad was announced on 1 February 2023.

No.	Pos.	Player	Date of birth (age)	Caps	Goals	Club
1	GK	Lee Gibson	23 September 1991 (aged 31)	42	0	(Scottish Football Association) Glasgow City
2	DF	Nicola Docherty	23 August 1992 (aged 30)	38	1	(Scottish Football Association) Rangers
3	DF	Emma Mukandi	19 September 1992 (aged 30)	69	7	(The Football Association) Reading
4	DF	Rachel Corsie (captain)	17 August 1989 (aged 33)	137	19	(The Football Association) Aston Villa
5	DF	Sophie Howard	17 September 1993 (aged 29)	33	1	(The Football Association) Leicester City
6	DF	Kelly Clark	10 June 1994 (aged 28)	3	1	(Scottish Football Association) Celtic
7	FW	Fiona Brown	31 March 1995 (aged 27)	46	2	(Swedish Football Association) Rosengård
8	MF	Samantha Kerr	17 April 1999 (aged 23)	9	0	(Scottish Football Association) Rangers
9	MF	Caroline Weir	20 June 1995 (aged 27)	93	15	(Royal Spanish Football Federation) Real Madrid
10	FW	Kirsty Hanson	17 April 1998 (aged 24)	13	1	(The Football Association) Aston Villa
11	MF	Lisa Evans	21 May 1992 (aged 30)	94	17	(The Football Association) West Ham United
12	GK	Jenna Fife	1 December 1995 (aged 27)	9	0	(Scottish Football Association) Rangers
13	MF	Jamie-Lee Napier	26 April 2000 (aged 22)	0	0	(The Football Association) London City Lionesses
14	MF	Chloe Arthur	21 January 1995 (aged 28)	33	2	(The Football Association) Crystal Palace
15	DF	Jenna Clark	29 September 2001 (aged 21)	4	1	(Scottish Football Association) Glasgow City
16	MF	Christie Murray	3 May 1990 (aged 32)	78	5	(The Football Association) Birmingham City
17	FW	Abi Harrison	7 December 1997 (aged 25)	14	3	(The Football Association) Bristol City
18	FW	Claire Emslie	8 March 1994 (aged 28)	48	11	(United States Soccer Federation) Angel City
19	MF	Lauren Davidson	1 October 2001 (aged 21)	3	0	(Scottish Football Association) Glasgow City
20	FW	Martha Thomas	31 May 1996 (aged 26)	19	10	(The Football Association) Manchester United
21	GK	Eartha Cumings	11 June 1999 (aged 23)	1	0	(The Football Association) Liverpool
22	MF	Erin Cuthbert	19 July 1998 (aged 24)	56	20	(The Football Association) Chelsea
23	FW	Christy Grimshaw	8 November 1995 (aged 27)	11	2	(Italian Football Federation) Milan
24	DF	Kirsty Smith	6 January 1994 (aged 29)	46	0	(The Football Association) West Ham United
25	FW	Brogan Hay	1 March 1999 (aged 23)	1	0	(Scottish Football Association) Rangers

=== Wales ===
Coach: (England) Gemma Grainger

The final squad was announced on 8 February 2023.

No.	Pos.	Player	Date of birth (age)	Caps	Goals	Club
1	GK	Laura O'Sullivan	23 August 1991 (age 35)	55	0	(Football Association of Wales) Cardiff City Ladies
2	DF	Lily Woodham	3 September 2000 (age 26)	10	1	(The Football Association) Reading
3	DF	Gemma Evans	1 August 1996 (age 30)	45	1	(The Football Association) Reading
4	DF	Sophie Ingle (captain)	2 September 1991 (age 35)	120	3	(The Football Association) Chelsea
5	DF	Rhiannon Roberts	30 August 1990 (age 36)	50	1	(The Football Association) Liverpool
6	MF	Josie Green	25 April 1993 (age 33)	23	0	(The Football Association) Leicester City
7	FW	Helen Ward	26 April 1986 (age 40)	102	44	(The Football Association) Watford
8	MF	Angharad James	1 June 1994 (age 32)	100	4	(The Football Association) Tottenham Hotspur
9	FW	Kayleigh Green	22 March 1988 (age 38)	65	16	(The Football Association) Brighton & Hove Albion
10	MF	Jess Fishlock	14 January 1987 (age 39)	134	34	(United States Soccer Federation) OL Reign
11	FW	Hannah Cain	11 February 1999 (age 27)	1	0	(The Football Association) Leicester City
12	GK	Olivia Clark	30 August 2001 (age 25)	4	0	(The Football Association) Bristol City
13	FW	Rachel Rowe	13 September 1992 (age 34)	49	3	(The Football Association) Reading
14	DF	Hayley Ladd	6 October 1993 (age 32)	75	3	(The Football Association) Manchester United
15	FW	Elise Hughes	15 April 2001 (age 25)	14	0	(The Football Association) Crystal Palace
16	MF	Charlie Estcourt	27 May 1998 (age 28)	34	3	(The Football Association) Birmingham City
17	FW	Georgia Walters	6 April 1993 (age 33)	5	0	(The Football Association) Sheffield United
18	MF	Ceri Holland	12 December 1997 (age 28)	15	3	(The Football Association) Liverpool
19	MF	Megan Wynne	21 January 1993 (age 33)	19	1	(The Football Association) Southampton
20	MF	Carrie Jones	4 September 2003 (age 23)	14	1	(The Football Association) Leicester City
21	GK	Safia Middleton-Patel	21 September 2004 (age 22)	0	0	(The Football Association) Manchester United
22	MF	Anna Filbey	11 October 1999 (age 26)	7	0	(The Football Association) Crystal Palace
23	DF	Esther Morgan	28 August 2002 (age 24)	1	0	(The Football Association) Sunderland
24	FW	Ella Powell	1 February 2000 (age 26)	2	0	(The Football Association) Bristol City
25	MF	Alice Griffiths	22 January 2001 (age 25)	6	0	(The Football Association) Southampton
	GK	Bethan Davies	7 November 1990 (age 35)	0	0	(The Football Association) Sheffield United
	DF	Maria Francis-Jones	1 April 2003 (age 23)	0	0	(The Football Association) Sheffield United

== Player representation ==
=== By club ===
Clubs with three or more players represented are listed.

Players	Club
4	(England) Leicester City, (England) Reading, (Iceland) Breiðablik, (Scotland) Rangers
3	(England) Bristol City, (England) Crystal Palace, (England) Liverpool, (England) Manchester United, (England) Sheffield United, (England) West Ham United, (Germany) Bayern Munich, (Iceland) Valur, (Philippines) Kaya–Iloilo, (Scotland) Glasgow City

=== By club nationality ===
Players	Clubs
39	England
12	United States
10	Iceland
8	Scotland
7	Sweden
5	Australia, Germany
4	Norway
3	Italy, Philippines
1	France, Serbia, Spain, Wales

=== By club federation ===
Players	Federation
80	UEFA
12	CONCACAF
8	AFC

=== By representatives of domestic league ===
National squad	Players
Iceland	9
Scotland	8
Philippines	3
Wales	1
