= Jessica Miclat =

Filipino footballer (born 1998)

Personal information
- Full name: Jessica Anne Delgado Miclat
- Date of birth: October 8, 1998 (age 28)
- Place of birth: Pomona, California, U.S.
- Height: 1.67 m (5 ft 6 in)
- Position: Midfielder

Team information
- Current team: Stallion Laguna

College career
Years	Team	Apps	(Gls)
2016–2019	UC Irvine Anteaters	73	(6)

Senior career*
Years	Team	Apps	(Gls)
2021	AaB	7	(0)
2021	Aris Limassol	15	(5)
2023	Eskilstuna United	28	(2)
2024–	Stallion Laguna	2	(0)

International career^{‡}
2018–	Philippines	28	(1)
Medal record
Women's football
Representing the Philippines
AFF Women's Championship
Winner	2022 Philippines	Team
Southeast Asian Games
Bronze medal – third place	2021 Vietnam	Team
- * Club domestic league appearances and goals as of 12:48; 29 August 2024 (UTC) ‡ National team caps and goals as of 03:55; 12 October 2022 (UTC)

Jessica Anne Delgado Miclat (born October 8, 1998) is a professional footballer who plays as a midfielder for PFF Women's League side Stallion Laguna. Born in the United States, she represents the Philippines at international level.

== Early life ==
Miclat grew up in the United States and was born to a Mexican mother and a Filipino father who hailed from Sampaloc, Manila in the Philippines. She was born in Pomona, California but considers Ontario, another city in the same state as her hometown and has two older brothers.

== Playing career ==
=== Collegiate ===
She played collegiate football, or soccer as it is called in the country. She played for the women's team of the UC Irvine Anteaters of the University of California, Irvine. She made 73 appearances for the team scoring a total of six goals from 2016 to 2019. In her senior team she was named part of the 2019 All Big West First team.

=== Club ===
In February 2021, Miclat was signed in to play for Danish club AaB Kvinder of the Elitedivisionen. Prior to signing up with AaB Kvinder, Miclat had negotiations with clubs in Spain, Belgium, Iceland, and Norway. She moved to Cyprus in September 2021 to play for Aris Limassol.

=== International ===
Jessica Miclat has also played for the Philippines women's national team in the 2018 AFC Women's Asian Cup.

==== International goals ====
Scores and results list the Philippines' goal tally first.

#	Date	Venue	Opponent	Score	Result	Competition
1.	January 27, 2022	Shri Shivchhatrapati Sports Complex, Pune, India	Indonesia	4–0	6–0	2022 AFC Women's Asian Cup

== Honours ==
Stallion Laguna

- PFF Women's Cup: 2024

Philippines

- Southeast Asian Games third place: 2021
- AFF Women's Championship: 2022
