= Ryley Bugay =

Filipino footballer (born 1996)

Personal information
- Full name: Kristen Ryley Sy Bugay
- Date of birth: January 23, 1996 (age 30)
- Place of birth: West Lafayette, Indiana, U.S.
- Height: 1.70 m (5 ft 7 in)
- Positions: Midfielder; defender

Youth career
- William Henry Harrison H.S.

College career
Years	Team	Apps	(Gls)
2015–2018	Marquette Golden Eagles	73	(1)

Senior career*
Years	Team	Apps	(Gls)
2017	F.C. Indiana	10	(0)
2019	1. FC Saarbrücken	10	(0)

International career^{‡}
2018–2023	Philippines	23	(0)
Medal record
Representing the Philippines
AFF Women's Championship
Winner	2022 Philippines	Team
Southeast Asian Games
Bronze medal – third place	2021 Vietnam	Team
- * Club domestic league appearances and goals as of November 17, 2019 ‡ National team caps and goals as of 11:13; August 5, 2023 (UTC)

Kristen Ryley Sy Bugay (born January 23, 1996), known as Ryley Bugay, is a retired footballer who played as a midfielder. Born in the United States, she represented the Philippines at international level.

== Early life and education ==
Ryley Bugay was born on January 23, 1996 in West Lafayette, Indiana, U.S. to Dave and Terri Bugay and has three siblings. She attended William Henry Harrison High School.

Pursuing a medical degree, she entered the Indiana University School of Medicine–Evansville.

== Career ==
=== High school ===
At William Henry Harrison High School, Bugay played for her school's women's soccer team and lettered in soccer for four times. In her sophomore season, she helped William Henry Harrison to the sectional championship and was named to the HCC All-Conference Team and the all-district second team. For her junior season, she was named high school MVP, received an all-state honorable mention, and was named into the all-district first team. Senior year, she became the captain of the team.

=== College ===
Bugay played for the Marquette Golden Eagles women's soccer team as a redshirt athlete. She started her collegiate career in 2015, a year after her first year in Marquette University as an academic freshman. In the 2017 season, now a redshirt junior, Bugay played a team-high of 1,871 minutes and started in all 21 matches as a holding midfielder. She is considered as a key player for Marquette and earned the nickname "Ry Boo Boo Glue" from her coach due to how she keeps the college team "together".

=== International ===
Following her 2017 season with Marquette, Bugay was invited to participate in an initial identification camp organized by the Philippines women's national football team in November 2017. She made it into the final-23 player roster for the 2018 AFC Women's Asian Cup.

Bugay played for the Philippines at the 2023 FIFA Women's World Cup in Australia and New Zealand. She secured a place in the roster despite having to pursue her medical studies at the same time. She was listed as a midfielder in the roster. She announced retirement from competitive football in September, 2023.

== Honours ==
=== International ===
==== Philippines ====
- Southeast Asian Games third place: 2021
- AFF Women's Championship: 2022
