= 2022 AFF Women's Championship squads =

The following are the squads for the 2022 AFF Women's Championship, hosted by Philippines, which took place 4 to 17 July 2022.

== Group A ==
=== Thailand ===
Head coach: (Japan) Miyo Okamoto

| No. | Pos. | Player | Date of birth (age) | Caps | Goals | Club |
|---|---|---|---|---|---|---|
| 1 | GK | Waraporn Boonsing | 16 February 1990 (aged 31) | 155 | 0 | (Football Association of Thailand) BG Bundit Asia |
| 2 | MF | Kanjanaporn Saenkhun | 18 July 1996 (aged 25) | 24 | 0 | (Football Association of Thailand) BG Bundit Asia |
| 3 | FW | Irravadee Makris | 20 January 1992 (aged 30) | 5 | 4 | (Football Association of Thailand) MH Nakhon Si Lady |
| 4 | DF | Phornphirun Philawan | 8 April 1999 (aged 22) | 10 | 0 | (Japan Football Association) MyNavi Sendai |
| 5 | DF | Amornrat Utchai | 4 September 1994 (aged 27) | 1 | 0 | (Football Association of Thailand) BG Bundit Asia |
| 6 | MF | Pikul Khueanpet | 20 September 1988 (aged 33) | 115 | 2 | (Football Association of Thailand) BG Bundit Asia |
| 7 | MF | Silawan Intamee (captain) | 22 January 1994 (aged 27) | 85 | 15 | (Football Association of Thailand) Chonburi FC |
| 8 | MF | Nipawan Panyosuk | 15 March 1995 (aged 26) | 20 | 2 | (Football Association of Thailand) Chonburi FC |
| 9 | MF | Warunee Phetwiset | 13 December 1990 (aged 31) | 100 | 0 | (Football Association of Thailand) MH Nakhon Si Lady |
| 10 | DF | Sunisa Srangthaisong | 6 May 1988 (aged 33) | 152 | 15 | (Football Association of Thailand) BG Bundit Asia |
| 11 | FW | Jaruwan Chaiyarak | 23 April 1990 (aged 31) | 10 | 3 | (Football Association of Thailand) Chonburi FC |
| 12 | MF | Nutwadee Pram-nak | 9 October 2000 (aged 21) | 12 | 2 | (Football Association of Thailand) Bangkok |
| 13 | FW | Kanyanat Chetthabutr | 24 September 1999 (aged 22) | 17 | 7 | (Football Association of Thailand) BG Bundit Asia |
| 14 | FW | Saowalak Pengngam | 30 November 1996 (aged 25) | 20 | 10 | (Football Association of Thailand) Chonburi FC |
| 15 | MF | Orapin Waenngoen | 7 October 1995 (aged 26) | 22 | 6 | (Football Association of Thailand) BG Bundit Asia |
| 16 | DF | Uraiporn Yongkul | 17 August 1998 (aged 23) | 1 | 0 | (Football Association of Thailand) BG Bundit Asia |
| 17 | FW | Taneekarn Dangda | 15 December 1992 (aged 29) | 71 | 19 | (Football Association of Thailand) MH Nakhon Si Lady |
| 18 | GK | Chotmanee Thongmongkol | 12 January 1999 (aged 23) | 1 | 0 | (Football Association of Thailand) Chonburi FC |
| 19 | FW | Pitsamai Sornsai | 19 January 1989 (aged 33) | 120 | 11 | (Chinese Taipei Football Association) Taichung Blue Whale |
| 20 | MF | Wilaiporn Boothduang | 25 June 1987 (aged 34) | 98 | 28 | (Football Association of Thailand) Royal Thai Air Force |
| 21 | DF | Chatchawan Rodthong | 22 June 2002 (aged 19) | 2 | 0 | (Football Association of Thailand) Bangkok |
| 22 | GK | Tiffany Sornpao | 22 May 1998 (aged 23) | 4 | 0 | (Football Association of Iceland) Keflavík |
| 23 | FW | Suchawadee Nildhamrong | 1 April 1997 (aged 24) | 20 | 15 | (Swedish Football Association) Kristianstads |

=== Philippines ===
Head coach: (Australia) Alen Stajcic

| No. | Pos. | Player | Date of birth (age) | Caps | Goals | Club |
|---|---|---|---|---|---|---|
| 1 | GK | Inna Palacios | February 8, 1994 (age 32) | 49 | 0 | (Philippine Football Federation) Kaya–Iloilo |
| 18 | GK | Olivia McDaniel | October 14, 1997 (age 28) | 13 | 0 | Unattached |
| 22 | GK | Kiara Fontanilla | July 1, 2000 (age 26) | 3 | 0 | (United States Soccer Federation) Westcliff University |
| 2 | DF | Malea Cesar | December 9, 2003 (age 22) | 13 | 1 | (United States Soccer Federation) Sunset Apollos |
| 3 | DF | Dominique Randle | December 10, 1994 (age 31) | 16 | 1 | Unattached |
| 5 | DF | Hali Long | January 21, 1995 (age 31) | 55 | 14 | (Philippine Football Federation) Kaya–Iloilo |
| 13 | DF | Chantelle Maniti | January 3, 2005 (age 21) | 6 | 0 | (Football Australia) FNSW Institute |
| 16 | DF | Sofia Harrison | February 16, 1999 (age 27) | 15 | 2 | Unattached |
| 19 | DF | Eva Madarang | September 13, 1997 (age 29) | 33 | 10 | Unattached |
| 23 | DF | Tara Shelton | June 26, 2001 (age 25) | 12 | 1 | (Philippine Football Federation) De La Salle University |
| 24 | DF | Maya Alcantara | July 22, 2000 (age 26) | 0 | 0 | (United States Soccer Federation) Saint Mary's College |
| 4 | MF | Jaclyn Sawicki | November 14, 1992 (age 33) | 7 | 0 | Unattached |
| 6 | MF | Tahnai Annis (captain) | June 20, 1989 (age 37) | 19 | 8 | Unattached |
| 7 | MF | Camille Rodriguez | December 27, 1994 (age 31) | 38 | 11 | (Philippine Football Federation) Kaya–Iloilo |
| 9 | MF | Jessica Miclat | October 8, 1998 (age 27) | 20 | 1 | (Cyprus Football Association) Aris Limassol |
| 10 | MF | Ryley Bugay | January 23, 1996 (age 30) | 21 | 0 | Unattached |
| 11 | MF | Anicka Castañeda | December 16, 1999 (age 26) | 23 | 9 | (Philippine Football Federation) De La Salle University |
| 12 | MF | Kaya Hawkinson | April 17, 2000 (age 26) | 5 | 0 | (United States Soccer Federation) Cal State Fullerton |
| 20 | MF | Quinley Quezada | April 7, 1997 (age 29) | 30 | 16 | (Football Association of Serbia) Red Star Belgrade |
| 21 | MF | Katrina Guillou | December 19, 1993 (age 32) | 9 | 5 | (Swedish Football Association) Piteå IF |
| 25 | MF | Sara Eggesvik | April 29, 1997 (age 29) | 2 | 0 | (Norwegian Football Federation) Malvik |
| 26 | MF | Jessika Cowart | October 30, 1999 (age 26) | 3 | 0 | (United States Soccer Federation) California Storm |
| 8 | FW | Sarina Bolden | June 30, 1996 (age 30) | 19 | 9 | (Japan Football Association) Chifure AS Elfen |
| 14 | FW | Isabella Flanigan | February 22, 2005 (age 21) | 12 | 2 | (United States Soccer Federation) Montverde Eagles |
| 15 | FW | Carleigh Frilles | April 11, 2002 (age 24) | 15 | 8 | (United States Soccer Federation) Coastal Carolina Chanticleers |
| 17 | FW | Alisha del Campo | September 20, 1999 (age 27) | 25 | 11 | (Philippine Football Federation) De La Salle University |
| 27 | FW | Alyssa Ube | August 5, 1998 (age 28) | 1 | 0 | (Philippine Football Federation) University of the Philippines |

=== Indonesia ===
Head coach: Rudy Eka Priyambada

| No. | Pos. | Player | Date of birth (age) | Caps | Goals | Club |
|---|---|---|---|---|---|---|
| | GK | Prihatini | 14 November 1995 (age 30) | 0 | 0 | (Football Association of Indonesia) Asprov DKI Jakarta |
| | GK | Fani Supriyanto | 30 May 2004 (age 22) | 1 | 0 | (Football Association of Indonesia) Persis Putri |
| | GK | Indri Yuliyanti | | 0 | 0 | (Football Association of Indonesia) Asprov Jabar |
| | DF | Remini Chere | 20 January 2000 (age 26) | 2 | 0 | (Football Association of Indonesia) Asprov Papua |
| | DF | Widia Safitri | | 0 | 0 | (Football Association of Indonesia) Persis Putri |
| | DF | Nastasia Suci | 9 October 2005 (age 20) | 0 | 0 | (Football Association of Indonesia) Persis Putri |
| | DF | Azra Kayla | 1 March 2004 (age 22) | 0 | 0 | (Football Association of Indonesia) Asprov DKI Jakarta |
| | DF | Safira Ika | 21 April 2003 (age 23) | 22 | 0 | (Football Association of Indonesia) Persis Putri |
| | DF | Vivi Oktavia | 7 March 1997 (age 29) | 24 | 2 | (Football Association of Indonesia) Persis Putri |
| | DF | Tia Darti | 24 September 1993 (age 32) | 6 | 0 | (Football Association of Indonesia) Persis Putri |
| | DF | Nadila Asri | | 0 | 0 | (Football Association of Indonesia) Asprov Babel |
| | MF | Ina Wetipo | | 0 | 0 | (Football Association of Indonesia) Asprov Papua |
| | MF | Hanipa Suandi | 24 October 2003 (age 22) | 0 | 0 | (Football Association of Indonesia) Persis Putri |
| | MF | Liza Madjar | 10 April 2006 (age 20) | 0 | 0 | (Football Association of Indonesia) Asprov Papua |
| | MF | Selly Wunungga | | 0 | 0 | (Football Association of Indonesia) Asprov Papua |
| | MF | Agnes Hutapea | | 0 | 0 | (Football Association of Indonesia) Asprov Jabar |
| | MF | Helsya Maeisyaroh | 7 May 2005 (age 21) | 5 | 0 | (Football Association of Indonesia) Persis Putri |
| | MF | Viny Silfianus | 3 July 2002 (age 24) | 3 | 0 | (Football Association of Indonesia) Asprov DKI Jakarta |
| | FW | Rosdilah Siti | 20 January 1999 (age 27) | 1 | 0 | (Football Association of Indonesia) Persis Putri |
| | FW | Octavianti Dwi | 1 July 1998 (age 28) | 13 | 1 | (Football Association of Indonesia) Persiba Putri |
| | FW | Sheva Imut | 20 April 2004 (age 22) | 0 | 0 | (Football Association of Indonesia) Arema Putri |
| | FW | Carla Bio | 9 August 2002 (age 24) | 3 | 0 | (Football Association of Indonesia) Asprov DKI Jakarta |
| | FW | Marsela Yuliana | 10 May 2003 (age 23) | 2 | 0 | (Football Association of Indonesia) Asprov Papua |

=== Singapore ===
Head coach: Stephen Ng

| No. | Pos. | Player | Date of birth (age) | Club |
|---|---|---|---|---|
| | GK | Noor Kusumawati | 29 September 1990 (aged 31) | (Football Association of Singapore) Lion City Sailors |
| | GK | Beatrice Tan Li Bin | 29 June 1992 (aged 30) | (Football Association of Singapore) Lion City Sailors |
| | GK | Nurul Haziqah Haszman | 29 April 2003 (aged 19) | (Football Association of Singapore) Tanjong Pagar United |
| | GK | Georgia Annette Khoo Yow | 11 December 1999 (aged 22) | (Football Association of Singapore) Ayer Rajah Gryphons |
| | DF | Nur Syazwani Ruzi | 20 December 2001 (aged 20) | (Football Association of Singapore) Lion City Sailors |
| | DF | Nurhidayu Naszri | 16 March 2004 (aged 18) | (Football Association of Singapore) Bussorah Youth Sports Club |
| | DF | Fatin Aqillah | 11 June 1994 (aged 28) | (Football Association of Singapore) Lion City Sailors |
| | DF | Dhaniyah Qasimah | 7 July 2004 (aged 17) | (Football Association of Singapore) Hougang United |
| | DF | Ernie Sulastri | 24 November 1988 (aged 33) | (Football Association of Singapore) Lion City Sailors |
| | DF | Umairah Hamdan | 11 March 2002 (aged 20) | (Football Association of Singapore) Lion City Sailors |
| | DF | Nadhra Aqilah Saiful | 12 April 1994 (aged 28) | (Japan Football Association) Albirex Niigata (S) |
| | DF | Nur Syafiqah Peer | 4 October 1996 (aged 25) | (Football Association of Singapore) Balestier Khalsa |
| | MF | Nur Farhanah Ruhaizat | 26 July 1998 (aged 23) | (Football Association of Singapore) Still Aerion Women |
| | MF | Irsalina Binte Irwan | 1 January 2007 (aged 15) | (Japan Football Association) Albirex Niigata (S) |
| | MF | Nur Izzati Rosni | 24 May 1999 (aged 23) | (Football Association of Singapore) Lion City Sailors |
| | MF | Putri Syaliza Sazali | 17 March 2003 (aged 19) | (Football Association of Thailand) Chonburi |
| | MF | Mastura Jeilani | 10 July 1992 (aged 29) | (Football Association of Singapore) Balestier Khalsa |
| | MF | Lila Tan Hui Ying | 4 June 2003 (aged 19) | (Football Association of Singapore) Lion City Sailors |
| | MF | Dorcas Chu | 29 July 2002 (aged 19) | (Football Association of Singapore) Lion City Sailors |
| | MF | Venetia Lim | 14 October 2003 (aged 18) | (Football Association of Singapore) Lion City Sailors |
| | MF | Alyssa Deanna Yazrin | 6 December 1999 (aged 22) | (Football Association of Singapore) Tanjong Pagar United |
| | MF | Nur Afiqah Omar | 15 October 2001 (aged 20) | (Football Association of Singapore) Still Aerion Women |
| | FW | Stephanie Gigette A Dominguez | 27 September 1998 (aged 23) | (Football Association of Singapore) Still Aerion Women |
| | FW | Danelle Tan | 25 October 2004 (aged 17) | (Football Association of Singapore) Lion City Sailors |
| | FW | Claire Marie Tay | 14 January 2000 (aged 22) | (Football Association of Singapore) Still Aerion Women |
| | FW | Summer Chong | 18 December 2004 (aged 17) | (United States Soccer Federation) Black Rock |
| | FW | Nicole Lim Yan Xiu | 10 April 2002 (aged 20) | (Football Association of Singapore) Lion City Sailors |

=== Australia U23 ===
The final squad was announced on 1 July 2022.

Head coach: Melissa Andreatta

| No. | Pos. | Player | Date of birth (age) | Caps | Goals | Club |
|---|---|---|---|---|---|---|
| 1 | GK | Jada Mathyssen-Whyman | 24 October 1999 (age 26) | 0 | 0 | (Football Australia) Sydney FC |
| 12 | GK | Sally James | 18 October 2002 (age 23) | 0 | 0 | (Football Australia) Melbourne City |
| 18 | GK | Chloe Lincoln | 4 January 2005 (age 21) | 0 | 0 | (Football Australia) Canberra United |
| 2 | DF | Jessika Nash | 5 October 2004 (age 21) | 0 | 0 | (Football Australia) Sydney FC |
| 3 | DF | Matilda McNamara | 18 December 1998 (age 27) | 0 | 0 | (Football Australia) Adelaide United |
| 4 | DF | Jamilla Rankin | 9 May 2003 (age 23) | 0 | 0 | (Football Australia) Brisbane Roar |
| 5 | DF | Ella Tonkin | 14 December 2002 (age 23) | 0 | 0 | (Football Australia) Adelaide United |
| 7 | DF | Winonah Heatley | 18 June 2001 (age 25) | 0 | 0 | (Danish Football Association) FC Nordsjælland |
| 8 | DF | Charlotte Grant (captain) | 20 September 2001 (age 25) | 0 | 0 | (Swedish Football Association) FC Rosengård |
| 11 | DF | Naomi Chinnama | 13 May 2004 (age 22) | 0 | 0 | (Football Australia) Melbourne City |
| 15 | DF | Cushla Rue | 9 July 2003 (age 23) | 0 | 0 | (New Zealand Football) Wellington Phoenix |
| 24 | DF | Chelsea Blissett | 3 March 2000 (age 26) | 0 | 0 | (Football Australia) Melbourne City |
| 25 | DF | Alexia Apostolakis | 16 May 2006 (age 20) | 0 | 0 | (Football Australia) Western Sydney Wanderers |
| 6 | MF | Sarah Hunter | 7 October 2003 (age 22) | 0 | 0 | (Football Australia) Sydney FC |
| 10 | MF | Daniela Galic | 17 June 2006 (age 20) | 0 | 0 | (Football Australia) FNSW Institute |
| 13 | MF | Leah Davidson | 28 March 2001 (age 25) | 0 | 0 | (Football Australia) Melbourne City |
| 16 | MF | Mackenzie Hawkesby | 13 April 2000 (age 26) | 0 | 0 | (Football Australia) Sydney FC |
| 19 | MF | Amy Sayer | 30 November 2001 (age 24) | 0 | 0 | (United States Soccer Federation) Stanford University |
| 20 | MF | Hana Lowry | 23 April 2003 (age 23) | 0 | 0 | (Football Australia) Perth Glory |
| 23 | MF | Paige Zois | 11 October 2003 (age 22) | 0 | 0 | (Football Australia) Melbourne Victory |
| 9 | FW | Caitlin Karic | 20 June 2005 (age 21) | 0 | 0 | (Football Australia) Melbourne City |
| 14 | FW | Katie Godden | | 0 | 0 | (United States Soccer Federation) DePaul University |
| 17 | FW | Sheridan Gallagher | 2 January 2002 (age 24) | 0 | 0 | (Football Australia) Western Sydney Wanderers |
| 21 | FW | Abbey Lemon | 14 August 2002 (age 24) | 0 | 0 | (Football Australia) Blacktown Spartans FC |
| 22 | FW | Princess Ibini-Isei | 30 January 2000 (age 26) | 0 | 0 | (Football Australia) Sydney FC |
| 26 | FW | Jynaya Dos Santos | 22 September 2005 (age 21) | 0 | 0 | (Football Australia) FNSW Institute |
| 27 | FW | Chelsie Dawber | 12 January 2000 (age 26) | 0 | 0 | (United States Soccer Federation) Chicago Red Stars |
| 28 | FW | Larissa Crummer | 10 January 1996 (age 30) | 0 | 0 | (Football Australia) Brisbane Roar |

=== Malaysia ===
Head coach: Jacob Joseph

| No. | Pos. | Player | Date of birth (age) | Club |
|---|---|---|---|---|
| 1 | GK | Olevia Olga Sabrinus | | (Football Association of Malaysia) Melaka United |
| 20 | GK | Asma Junaidi | | (Football Association of Malaysia) Sabah |
| 23 | GK | Nurul Azurin Mazlan | 27 January 2000 (age 26) | (Football Association of Malaysia) Negeri Sembilan |
| 2 | DF | Nor Saema Che Tengah | | (Football Association of Malaysia) |
| 3 | MF | Mira Fazliana Aidi | | (Football Association of Malaysia) Kedah |
| 9 | DF | Jessica Sussane Mailu | | (Football Association of Malaysia) Sabah |
| 10 | DF | Steffi Sarge Kaur Singh | | (Football Association of Malaysia) |
| 14 | DF | Siti Nurfaizah Saidin | | (Football Association of Malaysia) Melaka United |
| 17 | DF | Malini Nordin (captain) | 29 December 1985 (age 40) | (Football Association of Malaysia) Negeri Sembilan |
| 18 | DF | Nurfatin Rozani | | (Football Association of Malaysia) |
| 21 | DF | Hellma Emily Joinin | | (Football Association of Malaysia) Kuala Lumpur |
| 5 | MF | Alice Mic Michael | | (Football Association of Malaysia) Melaka United |
| 6 | MF | Nur Lyana Soberi | | (Football Association of Malaysia) Kedah |
| 7 | MF | Jaciah Jumilis | 23 July 1991 (age 35) | (Football Association of Malaysia) Kuala Lumpur |
| 8 | MF | Nur Faiqah Safira Farid | | (Football Association of Malaysia) Selangor |
| 12 | MF | Nur Farishah Erinna Hisham | | (Football Association of Malaysia) Kedah |
| 13 | MF | Andrea Lee Xin Yi | | (Football Association of Malaysia) Selangor |
| 15 | MF | Pedrolia Martin Sikayun | 18 February 1992 (age 34) | (Football Association of Malaysia) Sabah |
| 16 | MF | Eva Olivianie Antinus | | (Football Association of Malaysia) Melaka United |
| 19 | MF | Dadree Rofinus | | (Football Association of Malaysia) Sabah |
| 22 | MF | Waitie Taming | | (Football Association of Malaysia) Negeri Sembilan |
| 4 | FW | Henrietta Justine | | (Football Association of Malaysia) Melaka United |
| 11 | FW | Puteri Noralisa Wilkinson | 10 November 1995 (age 30) | (Football Association of Malaysia) Sabah |

== Group B ==
=== Vietnam ===
Head coach: Mai Đức Chung

| No. | Pos. | Player | Date of birth (age) | Caps | Goals | Club |
|---|---|---|---|---|---|---|
| 1 | GK | Lại Thị Tuyết | 27 April 1993 (age 33) | 2 | 0 | (Vietnam Football Federation) Phong Phú Hà Nam |
| 14 | GK | Trần Thị Kim Thanh | 18 September 1993 (age 33) | 37 | 0 | (Vietnam Football Federation) Hồ Chí Minh City |
| 20 | GK | Khổng Thị Hằng | 10 October 1993 (age 32) | 24 | 0 | (Vietnam Football Federation) Than Khoáng Sản |
| 2 | DF | Lương Thị Thu Thương | 1 May 2000 (age 26) | 12 | 0 | (Vietnam Football Federation) Than Khoáng Sản |
| 3 | DF | Chương Thị Kiều | 19 August 1995 (age 31) | 40 | 4 | (Vietnam Football Federation) Hồ Chí Minh City |
| 4 | DF | Trần Thị Thu | 15 January 1991 (age 35) | 21 | 2 | (Vietnam Football Federation) Hồ Chí Minh City |
| 5 | DF | Hoàng Thị Loan | 6 February 1995 (age 31) | 29 | 2 | (Vietnam Football Federation) Hà Nội |
| 13 | DF | Lê Thị Diễm My | 6 March 1994 (age 32) | 4 | 0 | (Vietnam Football Federation) Than Khoáng Sản |
| 15 | DF | Phạm Thị Lan Anh | | 0 | 0 | (Vietnam Football Federation) Hà Nội |
| 17 | DF | Nguyễn Thị Mỹ Anh | 27 November 1994 (age 31) | 3 | 0 | (Vietnam Football Federation) Thái Nguyên |
| 25 | DF | Trần Thị Thu Thảo | 15 January 1993 (age 33) | 33 | 3 | (Vietnam Football Federation) Hồ Chí Minh City |
| 6 | MF | Phạm Hoàng Quỳnh | 20 December 1992 (age 33) | 31 | 6 | (Vietnam Football Federation) Phong Phú Hà Nam |
| 7 | MF | Nguyễn Thị Tuyết Dung (Vice-captain) | 13 December 1993 (age 32) | 62 | 46 | (Vietnam Football Federation) Phong Phú Hà Nam |
| 8 | MF | Trần Thị Thùy Trang | 8 August 1988 (age 38) | 41 | 4 | (Vietnam Football Federation) Hồ Chí Minh City |
| 10 | MF | Trần Thị Hải Linh | 8 June 2001 (age 25) | 2 | 0 | (Vietnam Football Federation) Hà Nội |
| 11 | MF | Nguyễn Thị Trúc Hương | 4 March 2000 (age 26) | 0 | 0 | (Vietnam Football Federation) Than Khoáng Sản |
| 16 | MF | Dương Thị Vân | 20 December 1994 (age 31) | 59 | 14 | (Vietnam Football Federation) Than Khoáng Sản |
| 18 | MF | Nguyễn Thị Vạn | 10 January 1997 (age 29) | 36 | 13 | (Vietnam Football Federation) Than Khoáng Sản |
| 21 | MF | Ngân Thị Vạn Sự | 29 April 2001 (age 25) | 11 | 2 | (Vietnam Football Federation) Hà Nội |
| 22 | MF | Trần Thị Thu Xuân | 21 December 2002 (age 23) | 0 | 0 | (Vietnam Football Federation) Hà Nội |
| 23 | MF | Nguyễn Thị Bích Thùy | 1 May 1994 (age 32) | 39 | 11 | (Vietnam Football Federation) Hồ Chí Minh City |
| 9 | FW | Huỳnh Như (Captain) | 28 November 1991 (age 34) | 61 | 53 | (Vietnam Football Federation) Hồ Chí Minh City |
| 12 | FW | Phạm Hải Yến | 9 November 1994 (age 31) | 56 | 32 | (Vietnam Football Federation) Hà Nội |
| 19 | FW | Nguyễn Thị Thanh Nhã | 25 September 2001 (age 24) | 15 | 2 | (Vietnam Football Federation) Hà Nội |
| 24 | FW | Châu Thị Vang | 22 April 2002 (age 24) | 0 | 0 | (Vietnam Football Federation) Than Khoáng Sản |

=== Myanmar ===
Head coach: Thet Thet Win

| No. | Pos. | Player | Date of birth (age) | Caps | Goals | Club |
|---|---|---|---|---|---|---|
| 1 | GK | May Zin Nwe | 7 March 1995 (aged 26) | 12 | 0 | (Myanmar Football Federation) Myawady |
| 18 | GK | Zu Latt Nadi | 22 December 2000 (aged 21) | 0 | 0 | (Myanmar Football Federation) Myawady |
| 23 | GK | Khine Zar Win | 26 June 1999 (aged 22) | 0 | 0 | (Myanmar Football Federation) ISPE |
| 2 | DF | Aye Aye Moe | 4 February 1995 (aged 26) | 25 | 0 | (Myanmar Football Federation) Myawady |
| 3 | DF | Chit Chit | 18 October 1996 (aged 25) | 15 | 1 | (Myanmar Football Federation) Myawady |
| 4 | DF | Khin Myo Win | 10 February 1999 (aged 22) | 1 | 0 | (Myanmar Football Federation) ISPE |
| 5 | DF | Phyu Phyu Win | 1 December 2004 (aged 17) | 6 | 0 | (Myanmar Football Federation) Myawady |
| 12 | DF | Nant Zu Zu Htet | 26 September 2000 (aged 21) | 0 | 0 | (Myanmar Football Federation) Myawady |
| 15 | DF | Zune Yu Ya Oo | 12 February 2001 (aged 20) | 2 | 0 | (Myanmar Football Federation) Myawady |
| 21 | DF | Khin Than Wai | 2 November 1995 (aged 26) | 65 | 3 | (Myanmar Football Federation) Myawady |
| 22 | DF | Ei Ei Kyaw | 1 April 2002 (aged 19) | 0 | 0 | (Myanmar Football Federation) ISPE |
| 6 | MF | Thin Thin Yu | 27 September 1995 (aged 26) | 26 | 0 | (Myanmar Football Federation) ISPE |
| 8 | MF | San Thaw Thaw | 2 January 2001 (aged 21) | 7 | 3 | (Myanmar Football Federation) Myawady |
| 9 | MF | Khin Mo Mo Tun | 3 June 1999 (aged 22) | 35 | 3 | (Myanmar Football Federation) Thitsar Arman |
| 10 | MF | Khin Marlar Tun (captain) | 21 May 1988 (aged 33) | 8 | 4 | (Myanmar Football Federation) ISPE |
| 13 | MF | Hnin Pwint Aye | 26 January 2004 (aged 17) | 0 | 0 | (Myanmar Football Federation) ISPE |
| 14 | MF | Win Win | 12 February 2003 (aged 18) | 0 | 0 | (Myanmar Football Federation) YREO |
| 16 | MF | Naw Htet Htet Wai | 30 July 2000 (aged 21) | 1 | 0 | (Myanmar Football Federation) Myawady |
| 20 | MF | Nu Nu | 1 April 1999 (aged 22) | 25 | 5 | (Myanmar Football Federation) ISPE |
| 7 | FW | Win Theingi Tun | 1 February 1995 (aged 26) | 60 | 56 | (All India Football Federation) Lords FA |
| 11 | FW | Khin Moe Wai | 16 December 1989 (aged 32) | 63 | 33 | (Myanmar Football Federation) Thitsar Arman |
| 17 | FW | Myat Noe Khin | 24 July 2003 (aged 18) | 6 | 2 | (Myanmar Football Federation) YREO |
| 19 | FW | July Kyaw | 21 July 1999 (aged 22) | 30 | 10 | (Myanmar Football Federation) Thitsar Arman |

=== Timor-Leste ===
Head coach: (South Korea) Lee Min-young

| No. | Pos. | Player | Date of birth (age) | Caps | Goals | Club |
|---|---|---|---|---|---|---|
| 1 | GK | Agostinha | 28 August 1995 (age 31) | 6 | 0 | |
| 2 | DF | Brigida | | 1 | 0 | |
| 3 | DF | Trifonia | 2 October 1996 (age 29) | 5 | 0 | |
| 4 | DF | Martinha | | 3 | 0 | |
| 5 | DF | Maria (captain) | 1 February 1997 (age 29) | 8 | 0 | (East Timor Football Federation) Sport Laulara e Benfica |
| 6 | DF | Natalia | 23 December 1992 (age 33) | 7 | 0 | |
| 7 | MF | Femania | 8 May 1996 (age 30) | 7 | 0 | (East Timor Football Federation) Sport Laulara e Benfica |
| 8 | MF | Luselia | 6 May 1993 (age 33) | 8 | 1 | |
| 9 | FW | Marcia | | 3 | 0 | |
| 10 | FW | Dolores | | 3 | 1 | |
| 11 | FW | Julia | 8 October 1997 (age 28) | 6 | 0 | |
| 12 | GK | Leonilda (vice-captain) | | 2 | 0 | |
| 13 | MF | Nilda | 3 April 1999 (age 27) | 6 | 0 | |
| 14 | MF | Da Silva | | 7 | 0 | |
| 15 | DF | Ervina | 2 January 1996 (age 30) | 4 | 0 | |
| 16 | MF | Letizia | | 1 | 0 | |
| 17 | FW | Sonia | 2 May 1997 (age 29) | 7 | 0 | (East Timor Football Federation) Escola Portuguesa Ruy Cinatti |
| 18 | MF | Godelivia | 12 September 1998 (age 28) | 7 | 0 | (East Timor Football Federation) Sport Laulara e Benfica |
| 19 | FW | Virginia | | 1 | 0 | |
| 20 | GK | Madalena | | 0 | 0 | |
| 21 | FW | Isabel | | 1 | 0 | |
| 22 | DF | Zonalia | | 1 | 0 | |
| 23 | MF | Rosa | 2 September 1993 (age 33) | 6 | 0 | |

=== Cambodia ===
Head coach: Prak Vuthy

=== Laos ===
Head coach: Vongmisay Soubouakham
