= Tara Shelton =

Filipino footballer (born 2001)

Personal information
- Full name: Tara Allison Borromeo Shelton
- Date of birth: June 26, 2001 (age 25)
- Place of birth: Edmonds, Washington, U.S.
- Position: Defender

Team information
- Current team: DLSU Lady Booters

Youth career
- 2015–2019: Holy Names Cougars

College career
Years	Team	Apps	(Gls)
2019–	DLSU Lady Booters		

International career^{‡}
2016	Philippines U16	4	(0)
2019–	Philippines	15	(1)
Medal record
Women's football
Representing the Philippines
AFF Women's Championship
Winner	2022 Philippines	Team
- ‡ National team caps and goals as of 16:35; July 19, 2022 (UTC)

Tara Allison Borromeo Shelton (born June 26, 2001) is a footballer who plays as a defender for DLSU Lady Booters. Born in the United States, she represents the Philippines women's national team.

== Early life and education ==
Shelton was born in Edmonds, Washington, United States. She has roots in the Philippines, particularly in Cavite and Manila. She attended Holy Names Academy and later De La Salle University.

== Career ==
Shelton was part of the Holy Names Academy's football (soccer) team. After graduating from Holy Names in 2019, she committed to play for Pacific Lutheran University in the US NCAA.

However, she moved to the Philippines, where she played for De La Salle University's women's football team, which competes in the PFF Women's League.

== International career ==
Shelton has represented the Philippines internationally. She has been part of the national team rosters which competed at the 2019 Southeast Asian Games and the 2022 AFC Women's Asian Cup qualifiers. She was also included in the final roster for the competition proper. Shelton scored her first international senior goal in a 3–0 friendly win over Bosnia and Herzegovina in Brežice, Slovenia, with a left-footed strike from outside the box.

=== International goals ===
Scores and results list the Philippines' goal tally first.

#	Date	Venue	Opponent	Score	Result	Competition
1.	June 23, 2022	Terme Čatež, Brežice	Bosnia and Herzegovina	1–0	3–0	Friendly

== Honours ==
=== International ===
==== Philippines ====
- AFF Women's Championship: 2022
