= Kaya Hawkinson =

Filipino footballer (born 2000)

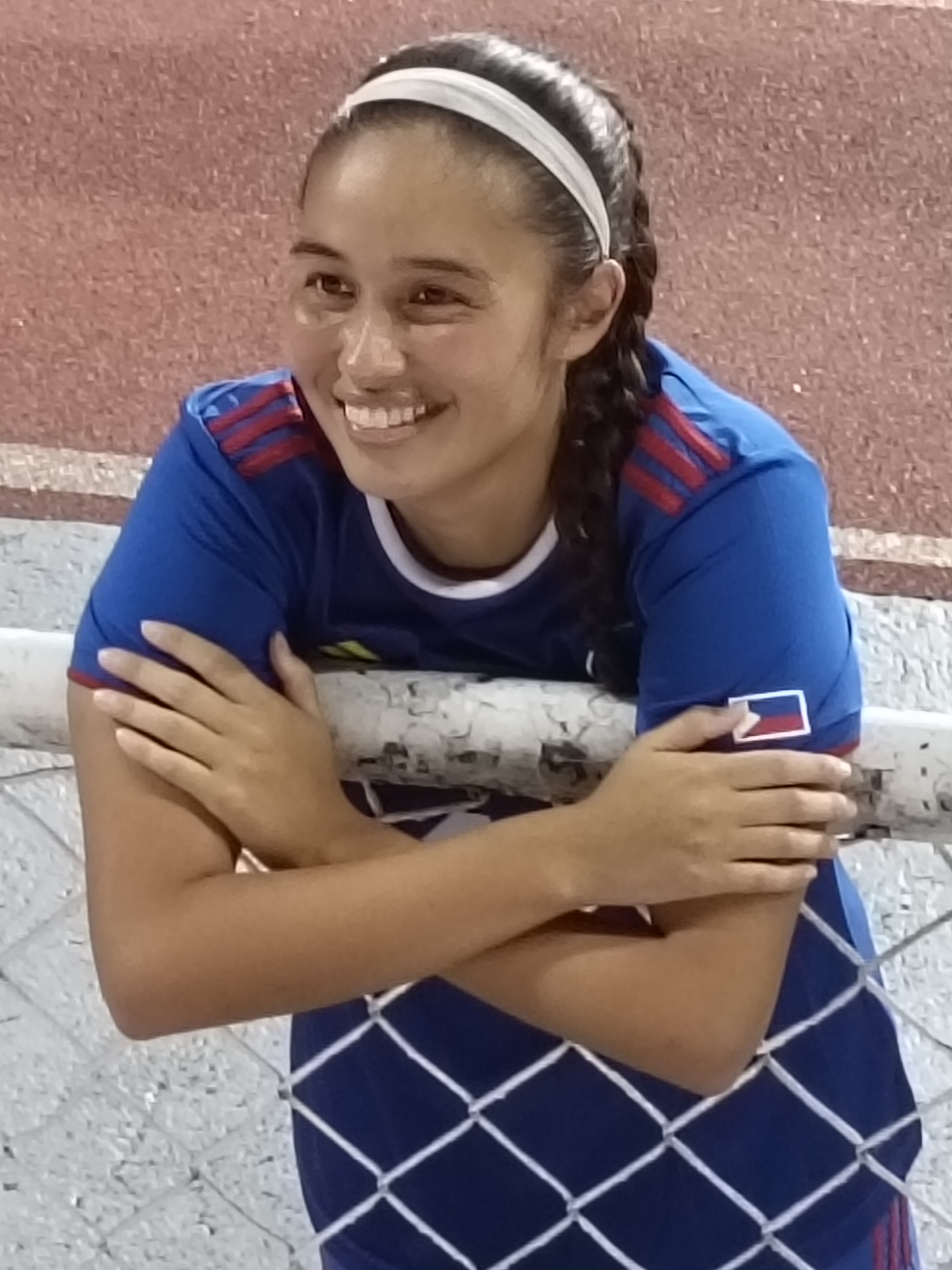
- Hawkinson with the Philippines in 2025

Personal information
- Full name: Kaya Tanada Hawkinson
- Date of birth: April 17, 2000 (age 26)
- Place of birth: Torrance, California, U.S.
- Height: 5 ft 6 in (1.68 m)
- Position: Midfielder

Team information
- Current team: Kaya–Iloilo
- Number: 2

Youth career
- 2014–2018: Palos Verdes Sea Kings
- 2014–2018: LA Galaxy

College career
Years	Team	Apps	(Gls)
2018–2023	Fullerton Titans	78	(3)

Senior career*
Years	Team	Apps	(Gls)
2023	Central Coast Mariners		
2024	Gintra	17	(3)
2025–2026	Stallion Laguna	7	(0)
2026–	Kaya–Iloilo	0	(0)

International career^{‡}
2022–	Philippines	26	(1)
Medal record
Representing the Philippines
AFF Women's Championship
Winner	2022 Philippines	Team
Southeast Asian Games
Gold medal – first place	2025 Thailand	Team
Bronze medal – third place	2021 Vietnam	Team
- * Club domestic league appearances and goals as of May 17, 2025 ‡ National team caps and goals as of September 21, 2026

Kaya Tanada Hawkinson (born April 17, 2000) is a professional footballer who plays as a midfielder for PFF Women's League club Kaya–Iloilo. Born in the United States, she represents the Philippines at international level.

== Early life ==
Hawkinson was born in Torrance, California and raised in Rancho Palos Verdes, California. She attended Palos Verdes High School.

== College career ==
Hawkinson has played college soccer at California State University, Fullerton.

== Club career ==
=== Youth ===
Hawkinson had her youth career in LA Galaxy.

=== Central Coast Mariners ===
In March 2023, Hawkinson joined NSW League One club Central Coast Mariners.

=== Gintra ===
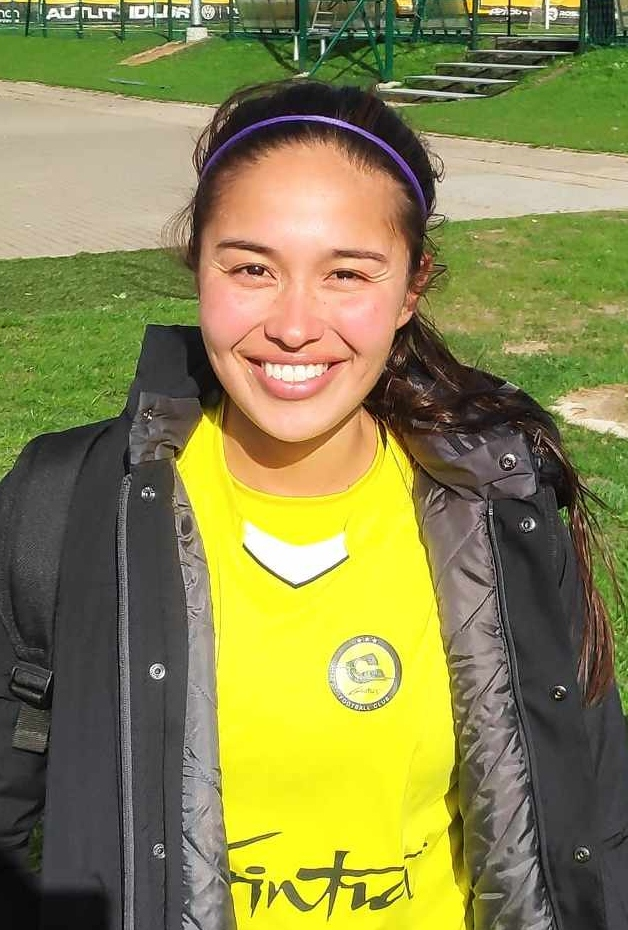
Hawkinson with Gintra in 2024

In February 2024, after playing for a season in Australia, Hawkinson joined A Lyga defending champions FC Gintra.

=== Stallion Laguna ===
In 2025, Hawkinson signed with PFF Women's League side Stallion Laguna.

== International career ==
Hawkinson was born in the United States to an American father and a Filipina mother, which made her eligible to represent the United States and Philippines at international level.

=== Philippines ===
Hawkinson was included in the Philippines as an alternate for the 2022 AFC Women's Asian Cup. She joined the squad again for a month-long training camp in Australia. The training camp was part of the national team's preparation for the 2021 Southeast Asian Games held in Hanoi, Vietnam.

She made her debut for the Philippines in an 8–0 win against Fiji, coming in as a substitute replacing Anicka Castañeda in the 46th minute.

Hawkinson scored her first international goal for the Philippines in a 7–0 win against Singapore in the 2022 AFF Women's Championship.

== Career statistics ==
=== Club ===
As of August 25, 2025

Appearances and goals by club, season and competition
Club	Season	League			National Cup		Continental		Other		Total	
Club	Season	Division	Apps	Goals	Apps	Goals	Apps	Goals	Apps	Goals	Apps	Goals
Gintra	2024	A Lyga	17	3	—		2 (Note: Appearances in UEFA Women's Champions League)	1	7 (Note: Appearances in Baltic League)	0	26	4
Stallion Laguna	2025	PFF Women's League	10	0	—		2 (Note: Appearances in AFC Women's Champions League)	0	0	0	12	0
Career total			27	3	0	0	4	1	7	0	38	4

=== International goals ===
Scores and results list the Philippines' goal tally first.

#	Date	Venue	Opponent	Score	Result	Competition
1.	July 6, 2022	Rizal Memorial Stadium, Manila	Singapore	6–0	7–0	2022 AFF Women's Championship

== Honours ==
FC Gintra

- A Lyga: 2024

Philippines

- Southeast Asian Games: 2025
- AFF Women's Championship: 2022
