= Sofia Wunsch =

Filipino footballer (born 1999)

- Wunsch during an Azkals match in 2023

Personal information
- Full name: Sofia Nicole Harrison Wunsch
- Birth name: Sofia Nicole Dador Harrison
- Date of birth: February 16, 1999 (age 27)
- Place of birth: Montgomery County, Maryland, U.S.
- Height: 5 ft 3 in (1.60 m)
- Position: Left back

Youth career
- Atholton Raiders
- SAC Premier Blue

College career
Years	Team	Apps	(Gls)
2017–2020	Slippery Rock	56	(9)

Senior career*
Years	Team	Apps	(Gls)
2021	Coppermine United		
2022	Werder Bremen	0	(0)
2024	Stallion Laguna	5	(0)

International career^{‡}
2018–	Philippines	66	(3)
Medal record
Women's football
Representing the Philippines
ASEAN Women's Championship
Winner	2022 Philippines	Team
Southeast Asian Games
Gold medal – first place	2025 Thailand	Team
Bronze medal – third place	2021 Vietnam	Team
- * Club domestic league appearances and goals as of December 9, 2024 ‡ National team caps and goals as of September 24, 2026

Sofia Nicole Harrison Wunsch (born February 16, 1999) is a professional footballer, who plays as a left back. Born in the United States, she represents the Philippines at international level.

== Early life ==
Wunsch was born in Montgomery County, Maryland and raised in Columbia, Maryland. She attended Atholton High School.

== College career ==
Wunsch attended Slippery Rock University.

== Club career ==
=== Coppermine United ===
Wunsch previously played for Coppermine United in the United States' United Women's Soccer league.

=== Werder Bremen ===
On September 1, 2022, it was announced that Wunsch signed for Frauen-Bundesliga club Werder Bremen. She left the club in December after three Bundesliga squad call-ups and one appearance in a friendly match.

== International career ==
Wunsch was born in the United States and is of American and Filipino descent. In 2018, Wunsch received her first call-up for the Philippines in the 2018 AFF Women's Championship.

Wunsch represented the Philippines at the 2022 AFC Women's Asian Cup qualification.

Wunsch continued to represent the Philippines at the 2023 FIFA Women's World Cup. She was sent off after an unfortunate tackle, which led to a disastrous loss against Norway, resulting in her team being eliminated from the Group Stage.

Wunsch has several caps under her belt and continues to be a mainstay for the Filipinas.

== Personal life ==
Wunsch is married since June 2024.

== Career statistics ==
Scores and results list the Philippines' goal tally first, score column indicates score after each Wunsch goal.

List of international goals scored by Sofia Wunsch
No.	Date	Venue	Opponent	Score	Result	Competition
1	April 11, 2022	Wanderers Football Park, Sydney, Australia	Fiji	1–0	8–0	Friendly
2	April 22, 2022	Wanderers Football Park, Sydney, Australia	Tonga	1–0	16–0	Friendly
3	April 8, 2023	Hisor Central Stadium, Hisor, Tajikistan	Tajikistan	1–0	8–0	2024 AFC Women's Olympic Qualifying Tournament

== Honours ==
Stallion Laguna

- PFF Women's Cup: 2024

Philippines

- Southeast Asian Games: 2025
- ASEAN Women's Championship: 2022
