= 2022 AFF Women's Championship final =

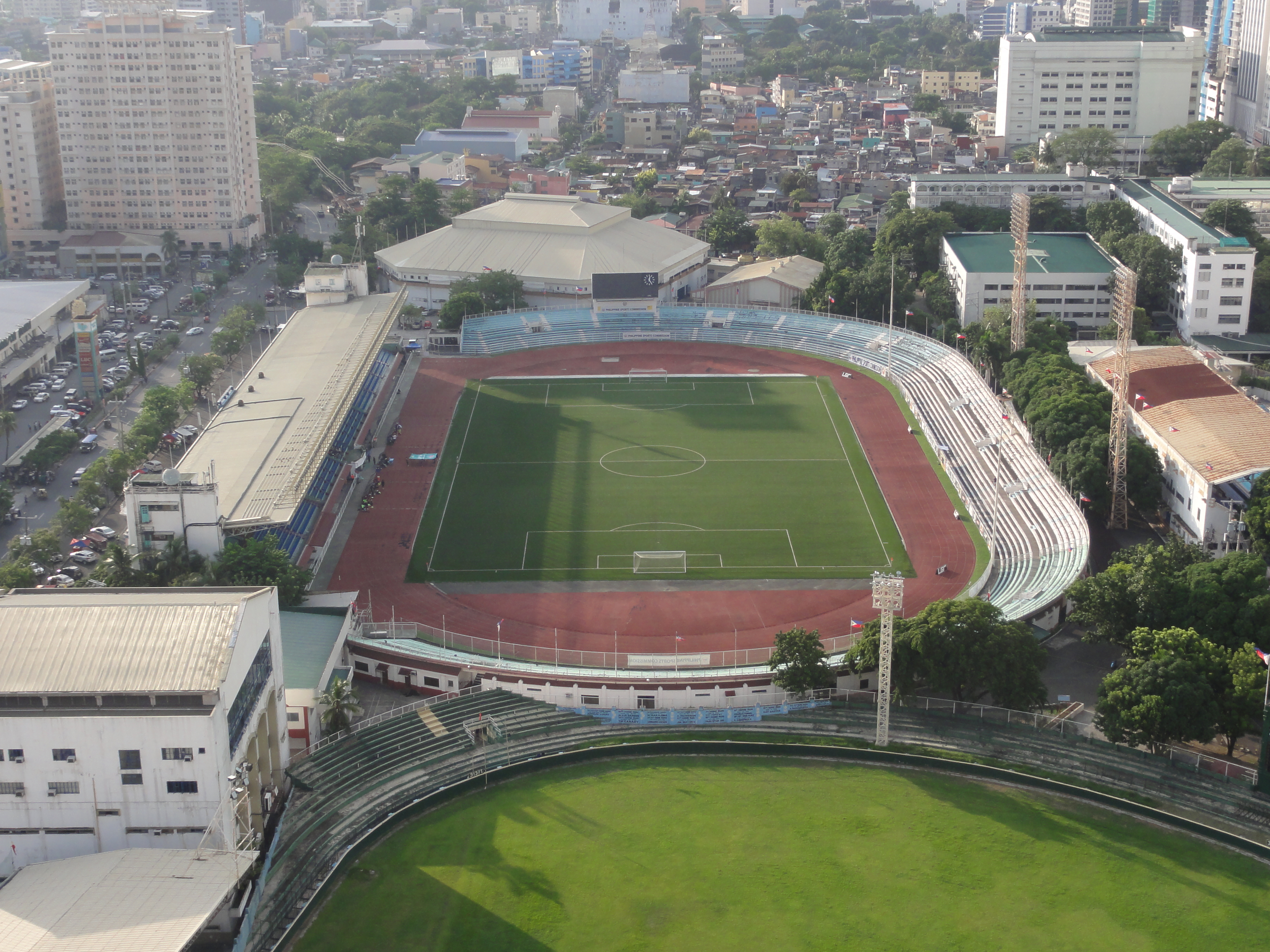
- Event: 2022 AFF Women's Championship
Philippines	Thailand
3	0
- Date: July 17, 2022
- Venue: Rizal Memorial Stadium, Manila
- Referee: Bùi Thị Thu Trang (Vietnam)
- Attendance: 8,257
- Weather: Good; 28 °C (82 °F)

The 2022 AFF Women's Championship final was a match between the Philippines and Thailand to determine the winner of the 2022 AFF Women's Championship. It was the 12th final of the AFF Women's Championship, the top-level Southeast Asian women's football tournament organised by the ASEAN Football Federation (AFF).

== Details ==
July 17, 2022
19:30

Philippines	3–0	Thailand
Cowart 8'; Guillou 20'; Tipkritta 89' (o.g.)	Report

Rizal Memorial Stadium, Manila
Attendance: 8,257
Referee: Bùi Thị Thu Trang (Vietnam)

Player of the Match:
(Philippines) Katrina Guillou

Assistant referees:
Ha Thi Phuong (Vietnam)
Nur Akmal Binti Anuar (Malaysia)
Fourth official:
Plong Pichakara (Cambodia)
