= Malea Cesar =

Filipino footballer (born 2003)

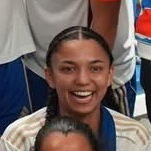
- Cesar in 2025

Personal information
- Full name: Malea Louise Engesser Cesar
- Date of birth: December 9, 2003 (age 22)
- Place of birth: Newport Beach, California, U.S.
- Height: 5 ft 4 in (1.63 m)
- Position: Defender

Team information
- Current team: Trinity Tigers
- Number: 26

Youth career
- Sunset HS Apollos

College career
Years	Team	Apps	(Gls)
2023–	Trinity Tigers	19	(1)

Senior career*
Years	Team	Apps	(Gls)
2023	Blacktown City	12	(1)
2025–	Corinthians	7	(1)

International career^{‡}
2022–	Philippines	38	(1)
Medal record
Women's football
Representing the Philippines
ASEAN Women's Championship
Winner	2022 Philippines	Team
Southeast Asian Games
Gold medal – first place	2025 Thailand	Team
Bronze medal – third place	2021 Vietnam	Team
- * Club domestic league appearances and goals as of June 22, 2025 ‡ National team caps and goals as of March 15, 2026

Malea Louise Engesser Cesar (born December 9, 2003) is a footballer who plays as a defender for Trinity Tigers. Born in the United States, she represents the Philippines at international level.

== Early life ==
Cesar was born in the United States to former Filipino athlete Ben Cesar and an American mother.

== International career ==
She was part of the Philippines team for the 2022 AFC Women's Asian Cup qualifiers but never appeared in a game. Cesar was also part of the squad which participated in the 2022 AFC Women's Asian Cup in India. She made her senior national team debut in the Philippines' 1–0 win against Thailand. She scored her first international goal during stoppage time in the Philippines' 6–0 win against Indonesia.

== Personal life ==
Malea Cesar's father, Ben Cesar, is a sprinter who competed in the 1991 SEA Games. Her sister, Naomi, is also an athlete who won a gold medal at the 2025 SEA Games for the women's 800 m event.

== International goals ==
Scores and results list the Philippines' goal tally first.

#	Date	Venue	Opponent	Score	Result	Competition
1	January 27, 2022	Shree Shiv Chhatrapati Sports Complex, Pune, India	Indonesia	6–0	6–0	2022 AFC Women's Asian Cup

== Honors ==
Philippines

- Southeast Asian Games: 2025
- ASEAN Women's Championship: 2022
