= Quinley Quezada =

Filipino footballer (born 1997)

- Quezada in 2023

Personal information
- Full name: Quinley Mirielle Campomanes Quezada-Keča
- Date of birth: April 7, 1997 (age 29)
- Place of birth: Rosemead, California, U.S.
- Height: 5 ft 6 in (1.67 m)
- Positions: Midfielder; forward

Team information
- Current team: T6 Nika
- Number: 20

Youth career
- 2010–2012: FC Golden State
- 2011–2015: Rosemead H.S.
- 2012–2015: LA Premier FC

College career
Years	Team	Apps	(Gls)
2015–2018	UC Riverside Highlanders	63	(9)

Senior career*
Years	Team	Apps	(Gls)
2019	Legends FC	10	(0)
2020	Xinbei Hang Yuan		
2021–2022	JEF United Chiba	5	(0)
2022–2023	Crvena zvezda	16	(7)
2023–2024	Perth Glory	20	(1)
2024	Manila Digger		
2025	Partizan	2	(0)
2026–	T6 Nika	4	(0)

International career^{‡}
2018–	Philippines	68	(23)
Medal record
Women's football
Representing the Philippines
AFF Women's Championship
Winner	2022 Philippines	Team
Southeast Asian Games
Bronze medal – third place	2021 Vietnam	Team
- * Club domestic league appearances and goals as of November 15, 2026 ‡ National team caps and goals as of August 13, 2025

Quinley Mirielle Campomanes Quezada-Keča (born April 7, 1997) is a professional footballer who plays as a midfielder for Serbian club T6 Nika. Born in the United States, she represents the Philippines at international level.

== Early life ==
Quezada was born to a Mexican father, Raúl Quezada, and a Filipino mother, Ruth Campomanes. She attended Rosemead High School where she lettered in soccer, cross country and track. With the soccer team, she was named part of the First Team All-League for the 2011–2015 seasons. She was recognized as the All-Mission Valley League Offensive Player of the Year in 2011 and 2015 as well as the Female Athlete of the Year as a senior student.

Quezada began her club youth soccer career in 2010 in the U14 division at FC Golden State where she played for two seasons, followed by playing for LA Premier FC for the following three seasons. Quezada was a prolific finisher, scoring over 180 goals over the course of her youth career.

== College career ==
Quezada attended college at the University of California, Riverside. She debuted for the UC Riverside Highlander in 2015, during the team's season-opening match against the George Washington Colonials. In the 2016 season, she was the second player among the Highlanders with the most goals scored, and tied for third in terms of points with another player.

In the 2017 season, Quezada was the top two player on the team in goals scored, assists made, and points earned. In the 2018 season, Quezada finished second on the team in goals (4), assists (2), and points (10). Quezada scored the game-winning goals in the Highlanders' 1–0 victory over UNLV on September 16 and the 1–0 win over Long Beach State on October 18 on Senior Night, earning her Second Team All-Conference recognition.

== Club career ==
In 2019, Quezada joined Legends FC of the Women's Premier Soccer League. She made 10 appearances for the club in the 2019 WPSL season.

In 2020, Quezada was originally recruited by Hang Yuan FC, but due to COVID-19 restrictions, she and her teammate Sarina Bolden were unable to travel from the United States to Taiwan and subsequently had to cancel their registration for the Taiwan Mulan Football League.

In mid-2021, Quezada was signed in by JEF United Chiba of the WE League of Japan. She made her debut for JEF United Chiba on October 2, 2021, and was the first Filipino to play a match in the WE League. She came on as a substitute in the 82nd minute in her side's 0–3 loss to Tokyo Verdy Beleza. She featured in five games for Chiba.

Quezada moved to ŽFK Crvena zvezda commonly known as Red Star Belgrade of the Serbian Women's Super League in June 2022.

In September 2023, it was announced that Quezada would reunite with coach Alex Epakis at Perth Glory, who was a part of the Philippines coaching staff at the 2023 FIFA Women's World Cup.

Quezada joined Manila Digger. She would play for the club at the 2024 PFF Women's Cup.

In August 2026, Quezada signed for ŽFK T6 Nika of the Serbian First Women's League.

== International career ==
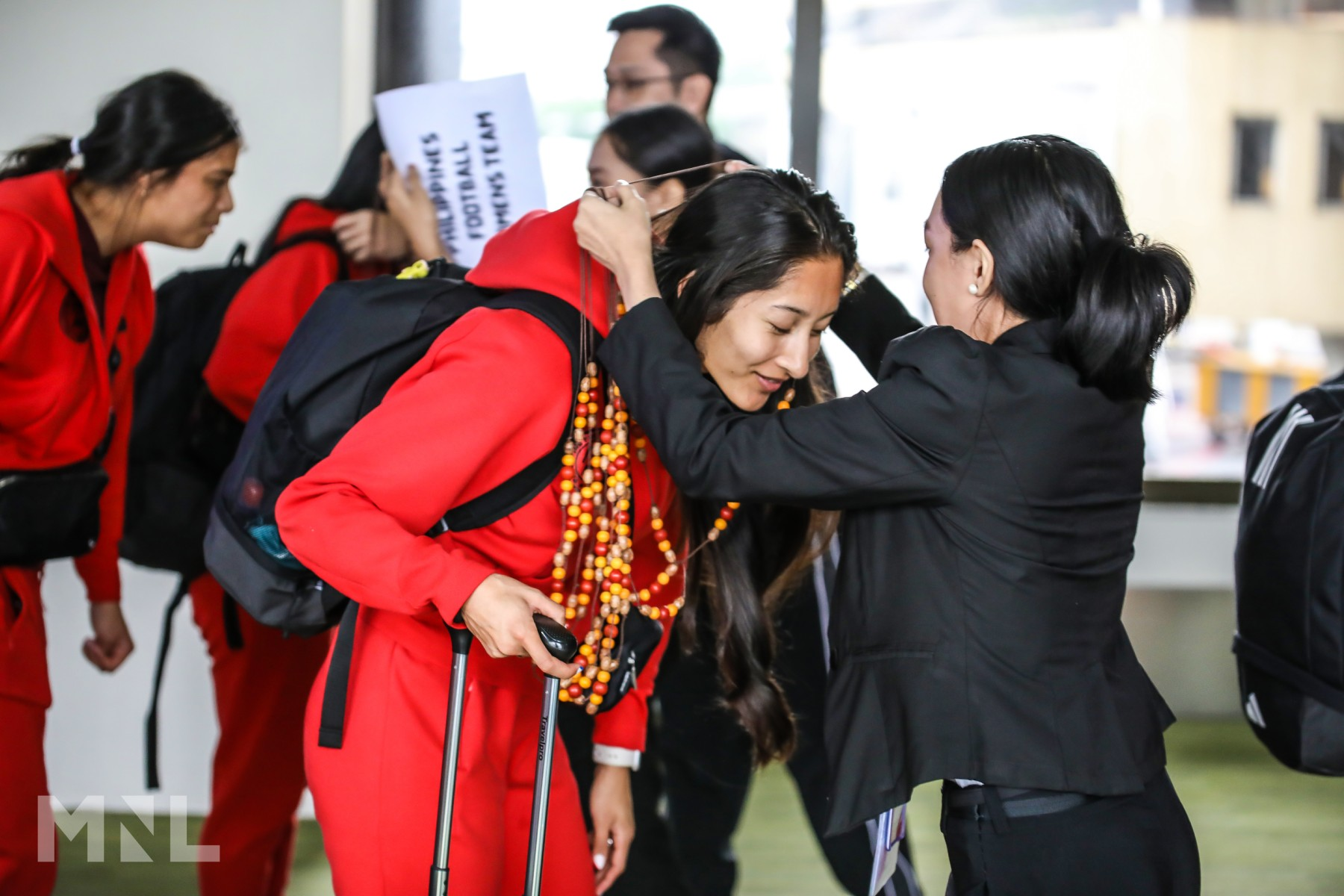
Quezada upon her arrival in Manila from the 2023 FIFA Women's World Cup

At the 2018 AFC Women's Asian Cup, Quezada was among the players that were part of the Philippines women's national football team that partook in the tournament. This meant that Quezada is the first women's soccer player of the UC Riverside Highlanders to be a part of a senior FIFA Women's World Cup qualifying roster. Quezada was a starter for all four of the team's matches: the three group play matches against Jordan, China, Thailand, and the 5th-place match against Korea Republic. The team opened the tournament with a 2–1 win against host Jordan

Quezada was also part of the Philippine national team roster for the 2018 AFF Women's Championship. She did not feature in the Philippines opener match against Myanmar due to recovering from a minor injury sustained during training camp, where the team lost 0–4. In the second match, Quezada came in as a substitute for Eva Madarang in the 60th minute in the team's 3–0 win over Singapore where she scored her first international goal in the 77th minute. In the third match against Vietnam, Quezada came in as a substitute in the 45th minute. In the fourth and final match of the tournament against Indonesia, Quezada would start the match and score the final goal of the match in stoppage time to help the team secure a result with a 3–3 draw after the team took a 2–0 lead into halftime but subsequently conceded 3 consecutive second-half goals.

Quezada started all three group stage games for the Philippines at the 2023 FIFA Women's World Cup, co-hosted in Australia and New Zealand. The team did not advance into the knockout stages, but did record their first ever win in the World Cup at the tournament.

== Personal life ==
Quinley is in a relationship with Dušan Keča. As of November 2025, she is pregnant and is expecting to give birth to a daughter.

== Career statistics ==
=== Club ===
As of November 15, 2026

Appearances and goals by club, season and competition
Club	Season	League			National Cup (Note: Includes Serbian Women's Cup, PFF Women's Cup)		Other		Total	
Club	Season	Division	Apps	Goals	Apps	Goals	Apps	Goals	Apps	Goals
Legends FC	2019	WPSL	10	0	—		—		10	0
JEF United Chiba	2021–22	WE League	5	0	0	0	—		5	0
Crvena zvezda	2022–23	Serbian SuperLiga	16	7	4	2	—		20	9
Perth Glory	2023–24	A-League	20	1	—		—		20	1
Manila Digger	2024	PFF Women's League	—		5	5	7 (Note: Three appearances and one goal in T&T Cup International Women's Football, four appearances and two goals in United Women's Invitational Football League)	3	12	8
Partizan	2025–26	Serbian SuperLiga	2	0	0	0	—		2	0
T6 Nika	2026–27	Serbian First League	4	0	0	0	—		4	0
Career total			57	8	9	7	7	3	73	18

=== International goals ===
Scores and results list the Philippines' goal tally first.

#	Date	Venue	Opponent	Score	Result	Competition
1.	July 3, 2018	Jakabaring Stadium, Palembang, Indonesia	Singapore	3–0	3–0	2018 AFF Women's Championship
2.	July 9, 2018	Jakabaring Stadium, Palembang, Indonesia	Indonesia	3–3	3–3	2018 AFF Women's Championship
3.	August 3, 2019	PFF National Training Center, Carmona, Philippines	Macau	1–0	11–0	Friendly
4.	August 3, 2019	PFF National Training Center, Carmona, Philippines	Macau	3–0	11–0	Friendly
5.	August 17, 2019	IPE Chonburi Stadium, Chonburi, Thailand	Timor-Leste	1–0	7–0	2019 AFF Women's Championship
6.	August 21, 2019	IPE Chonburi Stadium, Chonburi, Thailand	Thailand	1–0	2–4	2019 AFF Women's Championship
7.	August 21, 2019	IPE Chonburi Stadium, Chonburi, Thailand	Thailand	2–1	2–4	2019 AFF Women's Championship
8.	August 23, 2019	IPE Chonburi Stadium, Chonburi, Thailand	Singapore	2–0	4–0	2019 AFF Women's Championship
9.	December 8, 2019	Rizal Memorial Stadium, Manila, Philippines	Myanmar	1–0	1–2	2019 Southeast Asian Games
10.	January 30, 2022	Shiv Chhatrapati Sports Complex, Pune, India	Chinese Taipei	1–0	1–1 (4–3 pen.)	2022 AFC Women's Asian Cup
11.	April 7, 2022	Wanderers Football Park, Sydney, Australia	Fiji	1–0	7–2	Friendly
12.	April 7, 2022	Wanderers Football Park, Sydney, Australia	Fiji	7–2	7–2	Friendly
13.	April 11, 2022	Wanderers Football Park, Sydney, Australia	Fiji	2–0	0–8	Friendly
14.	May 9, 2022	Cẩm Phả Stadium, Cẩm Phả, Vietnam	Cambodia	4–0	5–0	2021 Southeast Asian Games
15.	May 21, 2022	Cẩm Phả Stadium, Cẩm Phả, Vietnam	Myanmar	2–1	2–1	2021 Southeast Asian Games
16.	June 26, 2022	Terme Čatež, Brežice, Bosnia and Herzegovina	Bosnia and Herzegovina	1–1	2–1	Friendly
17.	July 8, 2022	Rizal Memorial Stadium, Manila, Philippines	Malaysia	3–0	4–0	2022 AFF Women's Championship
18.	December 15, 2022	Wanderers Football Park, Sydney, Australia	Papua New Guinea	6–0	9–0	Friendly
19.	December 15, 2022	Wanderers Football Park, Sydney, Australia	Papua New Guinea	8–0	9–0	Friendly
20.	December 15, 2022	Wanderers Football Park, Sydney, Australia	Papua New Guinea	9–0	9–0	Friendly
21.	April 8, 2023	Hisor Central Stadium, Hisor, Tajikistan	Tajikistan	4–0	8–0	2024 AFC Women's Olympic Qualifying Tournament
22.	April 11, 2023	Hisor Central Stadium, Hisor, Tajikistan	Hong Kong	4–0	4–0	2024 AFC Women's Olympic Qualifying Tournament
23.	September 22, 2023	Wenzhou Sports Center Stadium, Wenzhou, China	Hong Kong	2–1	3–1	2022 Asian Games
24.	August 7, 2025	Việt Trì Stadium, Phú Thọ, Vietnam	Timor-Leste	1–0	7–0	2025 ASEAN Women's Championship
25.	August 7, 2025	Việt Trì Stadium, Phú Thọ, Vietnam	Timor-Leste	4–0	7–0	2025 ASEAN Women's Championship

== Honors ==
Crvena zvezda

- Serbian SuperLiga runner-up: 2022–23
- Serbian Women's Cup runner-up: 2022–23

Philippines

- Southeast Asian Games third place: 2021
- AFF Women's Championship: 2022
