= Trần Thị Thu =

Vietnamese footballer (born 1991)

Personal information
- Date of birth: 15 January 1991 (age 35)
- Place of birth: Tư Nghĩa, Quảng Ngãi, Vietnam
- Height: 1.57 m (5 ft 2 in)
- Position: Center back

Team information
- Current team: Thái Nguyên T&T
- Number: 15

Senior career*
Years	Team	Apps	(Gls)
2011–2024	Hồ Chí Minh City		
2024–	Thái Nguyên T&T		

International career^{‡}
2017–	Vietnam	40	(3)
- * Club domestic league appearances and goals ‡ National team caps and goals as of 29 September 2021

Trần Thị Thu (born 15 January 1991) is a Vietnamese footballer who plays as a center back for Women's Championship club Thái Nguyên T&T and the Vietnam women's national team.

== Club career ==
Trần Thị Thu has played for Hồ Chí Minh City for 13 years. In March 2024, she joined Thái Nguyên T&T, signing a two-year contract.

== International career ==
With Vietnam national team, Thu featured in the 2021 and 2023 SEA Games as Vietnam won the gold medal in both occasions. She represented Vietnam at the 2023 FIFA Women's World Cup.

== Personal life ==
Trần Thị Thu held a wedding with Nguyễn Thị Thương on 6 January 2024. She is the first female football player in Vietnam to publicly hold a wedding with someone of the same sex.
