= Maya Alcantara =

Filipino footballer (born 2000)

Personal information
- Full name: Maya Taylor Rosales Alcantara
- Date of birth: July 22, 2000 (age 26)
- Place of birth: Rancho Cucamonga, California, U.S.
- Height: 1.78 m (5 ft 10 in)
- Positions: Defender; midfielder

Team information
- Current team: Cashmere Technical
- Number: 14

Youth career
- Legends IE

College career
Years	Team	Apps	(Gls)
2018–2021	Saint Mary's Gaels	54	(4)
2022	Georgetown Hoyas	22	(0)

Senior career*
Years	Team	Apps	(Gls)
2024–2025	Kaya–Iloilo	0	(0)
2026–	Cashmere Technical	8	(0)

International career^{‡}
2022–2024	Philippines	9	(2)
Medal record
Women's football
Representing the Philippines
AFF Women's Championship
Winner	2022 Philippines	Team
- * Club domestic league appearances and goals as of 04:00; 26 August 2022 (UTC) ‡ National team caps and goals as of 02:28; 13 July 2024 (UTC)

Maya Taylor Rosales Alcantara (born July 22, 2000) is a professional footballer who plays as a defender or a midfielder for Women's South Island League club Cashmere Technical and the Philippines women's national team.

== College career ==
=== Saint Mary's College of California ===
Alcantara played her first four years of collegiate soccer at Saint Mary's College of California.

=== Georgetown University ===
In 2022, Alcantara pursued her graduate studies at Georgetown University. She was included in the women's soccer team squad.

== International career ==
=== Philippines ===
Alcantara was included in the Philippines squad for a month-long training camp in Australia. The training camp was part of the national team's preparation for the 2021 Southeast Asian Games held in Hanoi, Vietnam.

Alcantara made her debut for the Philippines in a 7–0 win against Singapore in the 2022 AFF Women's Championship. She made her second appearance for the Philippines in a 4–0 win against Malaysia. Philippines ended up winning the 2022 AFF Women's Championship title.

== Career statistics ==
Scores and results list the Philippines' goal tally first.

#	Date	Venue	Opponent	Score	Result	Competition
1.	April 8, 2023	Hisor Central Stadium, Hisor, Tajikistan	Tajikistan	6–0	8–0	2024 AFC Women's Olympic Qualifying Tournament

== Honours ==
Philippines

- AFF Women's Championship: 2022

Cashmere Technical

- Women's South Island League: 2026
- Reta Fitzpatrick Cup: 2026

Individual

- Mainland Football Women's Midfielder of the Year: 2026
