= Phạm Hoàng Quỳnh =

Vietnamese footballer

Personal information
- Date of birth: 20 September 1992 (age 34)
- Place of birth: Hải Hà, Quảng Ninh, Vietnam
- Height: 1.59 m (5 ft 3 in)
- Position: Midfielder

Team information
- Current team: Phong Phú Hà Nam
- Number: 25

Senior career*
Years	Team	Apps	(Gls)
2010–2020	Than Khoáng Sản	93	(54)
2021–	Phong Phú Hà Nam	34	(9)

International career^{‡}
2012–	Vietnam	32	(7)
- * Club domestic league appearances and goals ‡ National team caps and goals as of 29 September 2019

Phạm Hoàng Quỳnh (born 20 September 1992) is a Vietnamese footballer who plays as a midfielder for Women's Championship club Phong Phú Hà Nam. She is a member of the Vietnam women's national team.

In 2018, she married fellow footballer Hồ Ngọc Thắng.

== International goals ==
No.	Date	Venue	Opponent	Score	Result	Competition
1.	5 July 2018	Gelora Sriwijaya Stadium, Palembang, Indonesia	Singapore	7–0	10–0	2018 AFF Women's Championship
2.	7 July 2018	Gelora Sriwijaya Stadium, Palembang, Indonesia	Philippines	4–0	5–0	2018 AFF Women's Championship
3.	9 July 2022	Biñan Football Stadium, Biñan, Philippines	Laos	1–0	5–0	2022 AFF Women's Championship
