= Tahnai Annis =

Filipino footballer (born 1989)

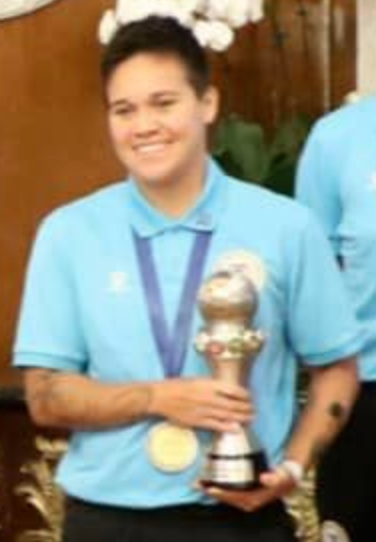
- Annis in 2022

Personal information
- Full name: Tahnai Lauren Rivera Annis
- Date of birth: June 20, 1989 (age 37)
- Place of birth: Ohio, United States
- Height: 1.61 m (5 ft 3 in)
- Position: Attacking midfielder

College career
Years	Team	Apps	(Gls)
2008–2011	Florida Gators	96	(38)

Senior career*
Years	Team	Apps	(Gls)
2012–2014	Þór/KA	54	(16)
2023	Þór/KA	18	(2)

International career^{‡}
2018–2024	Philippines	43	(15)

Managerial career
- 2016–2017: Averett Cougars (asst.)
Medal record
Women's football
Representing the Philippines
AFF Women's Championship
Winner	2022 Philippines	Team
Southeast Asian Games
Bronze medal – third place	2021 Vietnam	Team
- * Club domestic league appearances and goals ‡ National team caps and goals as of 11:21; December 29, 2024 (UTC)

Tahnai Lauren Rivera Annis (born June 20, 1989) is a retired professional footballer who played as an attacking midfielder for Úrvalsdeild kvenna club Þór/KA from 2012 to 2014 and in 2023. Born in the United States, she also captained the Philippines women's national team.

== Early life and education ==
Tahnai Annis was born on June 20, 1989, in Ohio in the United States. She was born to Rusty and Myla Annis. Rusty is a South Bend, Indiana native while Myla is a Filipino woman who hails from Quezon City. From 1993 to 1996, the Annis family lived in Columbus, Ohio where the Annis patriarch worked as a physical therapist at Southern Indiana Orthopedics (SIO). The family moved to Zanesville after the Columbus Regional Hospital bought SIO.

She attended the Tri-Valley High School for three years before moving to Pickerington High School North in her fourth year. She graduated from the University of Florida in 2012 with a bachelor's degree in sports management with a minor in business administration. She entered Averett University to pursue a master's degree in business administration which has a focus in marketing.

== College career ==
Annis played for the women's soccer team of the University of Florida at NCAA Division I from 2008 to 2011. She scored a total of 38 goals and made 16 assists in 96 matches for the Gators. In 2008, Annis became part of the SEC All-Freshman Team and SoccerBuzz.com Freshman All-America squad and in 2010 was also an All-American and member of the Southeastern Conference's All-Second Team.

== Club career ==
After college, Annis was drafted to the Western New York Flash for the Women's Premier Soccer League Elite but the league folded.

She played professionally for Þór/KA of the Úrvalsdeild kvenna, the top flight women's league in Iceland, from 2012 to 2014. She helped the club win the league title in 2012 and earned the club's 2013 MVP award. She has played at the UEFA Women's Champions League with the Icelandic club. Annis left the club in 2014.

She joined the Washington Spirit of the National Women's Soccer League during the pre-season but later took an assistant coaching job with Averett University.

Annis returned to Þór/KA in January 2023. She signed a one-year contract with the team. For most of 2024, she would reflect if she was still able to play competitive football. She announced her retirement from professional football by the end of the year citing her age.

== International career ==
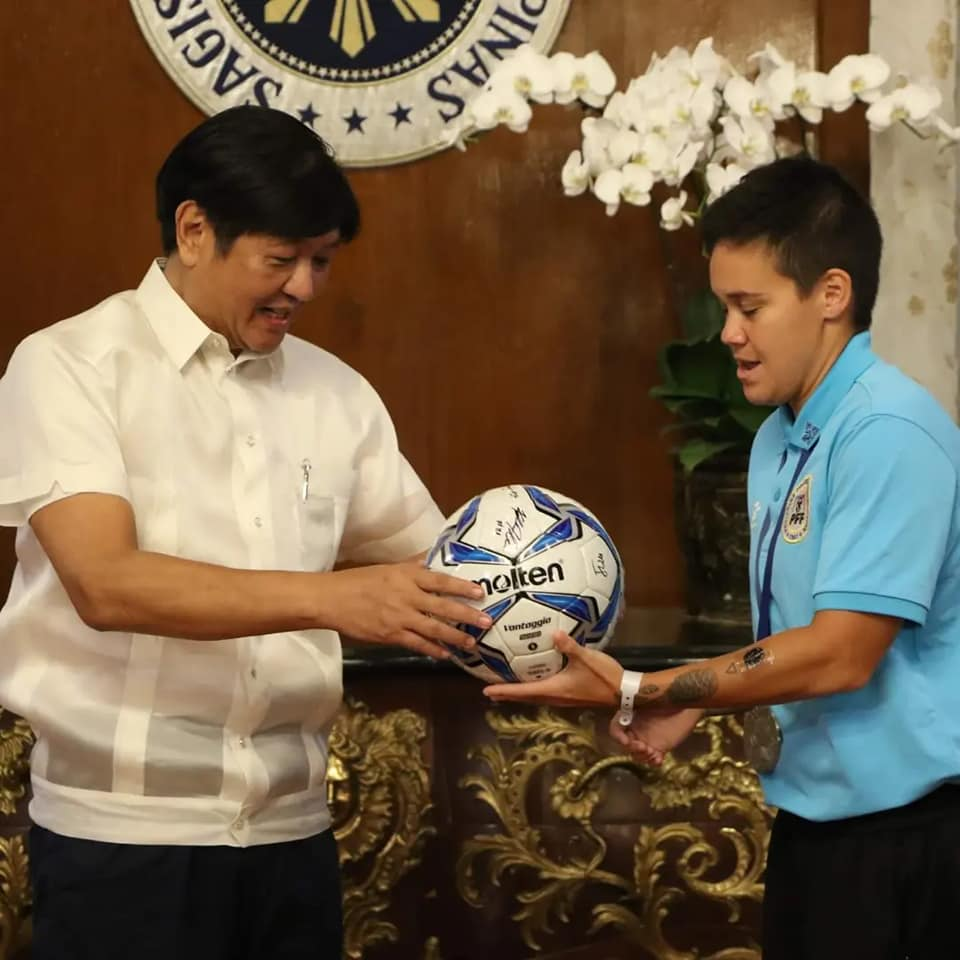
Annis presents Philippine president Bongbong Marcos with a football signed by the players of the Philippines women's team after winning the 2022 AFF Women's Championship, July 20, 2022

Tahnai Annis was potentially eligible to play for the Philippines women's national football team through her Filipino mother. She joined an identification camp in California in 2015. However, her international career was delayed by the fact that her mother is already naturalized American citizen at the time of Tahnai's birth. Her mother had to apply for a dual citizenship.

She joined the national team in January 2018 in a training camp in the United States and eventually named as part of the final roster of the Philippines for the 2018 AFC Women's Asian Cup in Jordan and was designated as captain. Annis was able to obtain a Philippine passport in time for the tournament. Patrice Impelido also serves as co-captain for the national team for the continental tournament.

In the Philippines' first group stage match against host Jordan which ended in a 2–1 win, Annis had her first international cap. Annis scored her first goal for the Philippines in their 2–1 win against Nepal in the 2022 AFC Women's Asian Cup qualifiers held in September 2021.

Annis also led the Philippine squad that won its first ever ASEAN Football Federation tournament title as its captain – the 2022 AFF Women's Championship.

She announced her retirement from professional football in December 2024. She last played in April 2024 in two pair of friendlies against South Korea.

== Coaching career ==
The women's soccer team of Averett University had Annis as their assistant coach. Annis was also part of the coaching staff of the Philippines U17 team led by head coach Sinisa Cohadzic which competed in the 2024 AFC U-17 Women's Asian Cup

== Personal life ==
Openly a member of the LGBT community, Annis is an Athlete Ally pro ambassador.

== Career statistics ==
=== Club ===
Club	Season	League			Cup (Note: Includes Icelandic Women's Football Cup) (Note: Includes Icelandic Super Cup)		Continental		Total	
Club	Season	Division	Apps	Goals	Apps	Goals	Apps	Goals	Apps	Goals
Þór/KA	2012	Úrvalsdeild kvenna	18	7	3	2	—		21	9
Þór/KA	2013	Úrvalsdeild kvenna	18	6	5	1	2 (Note: Appearances in UEFA Women's Champions League)	0	25	7
Þór/KA	2014	Úrvalsdeild kvenna	18	3	1	0	—		19	3
Þór/KA	2023	Úrvalsdeild kvenna	18	2	1	0	—		19	2
Career total			72	18	10	3	2	0	84	21

=== International ===
Scores and results list the Philippines' goal tally first, score column indicates score after each Annis goal.

List of international goals scored by Tahnai Annis
No.	Date	Venue	Opponent	Score	Result	Competition	Ref.
1	September 18, 2021	JAR Stadium, Tashkent, Uzbekistan	Nepal	1–1	2–1	2022 AFC Women's Asian Cup qualification	
2	September 24, 2021	JAR Stadium, Tashkent, Uzbekistan	Hong Kong	1–0	2–1	2022 AFC Women's Asian Cup qualification	
3	January 27, 2022	Shri Shivchhatrapati Sports Complex, Pune, India	Indonesia	3–0	6–0	2022 AFC Women's Asian Cup	
4	January 27, 2022	Shri Shivchhatrapati Sports Complex, Pune, India	Indonesia	5–0	6–0	2022 AFC Women's Asian Cup	
5	April 7, 2022	Wanderers Football Park, Sydney, Australia	Fiji	4–0	7–2	Friendly	
6	April 7, 2022	Wanderers Football Park, Sydney, Australia	Fiji	5–0	7–2	Friendly	
7	April 22, 2022	Wanderers Football Park, Sydney, Australia	Tonga	16–0	16–0	Friendly	
8	May 11, 2022	Cẩm Phả Stadium, Cẩm Phả, Vietnam	Vietnam	1–0	1–2	2021 Southeast Asian Games	
9	July 6, 2022	Rizal Memorial Stadium, Manila, Philippines	Singapore	3–0	7–0	2022 AFF Women's Championship	
10	July 10, 2022	Rizal Memorial Stadium, Manila, Philippines	Indonesia	1–1	4–1	2022 AFF Women's Championship	
11	July 15, 2022	Rizal Memorial Stadium, Manila, Philippines	Vietnam	2–0	4–0	2022 AFF Women's Championship	
12	December 11, 2022	Wanderers Football Park, Sydney, Australia	Papua New Guinea	2–0	5–1	Friendly	
13	December 15, 2022	Wanderers Football Park, Sydney, Australia	Papua New Guinea	4–0	9–0	Friendly	
14	April 8, 2023	Hisor Central Stadium, Hisor, Tajikistan	Tajikistan	2–0	8–0	2024 AFC Women's Olympic Qualifying Tournament	
15	November 1, 2023	Perth Rectangular Stadium, Perth, Australia	Iran	1–0	1–0	2024 AFC Women's Olympic Qualifying Tournament	

== Honours ==
Þór/KA

- Úrvalsdeild kvenna: 2012
- Icelandic Women's Cup runner-up: 2013
- Icelandic Super Cup: 2013

Philippines

- Southeast Asian Games third place: 2021
- AFF Women's Championship: 2022
