= Sarina Bolden =

Filipino footballer (born 1996)

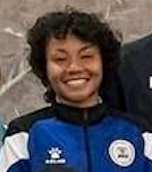
- Bolden in 2022

Personal information
- Full name: Sarina Isabel Calpo Bolden
- Date of birth: June 30, 1996 (age 30)
- Place of birth: Santa Clara, California, United States
- Height: 5 ft 8 in (1.72 m)
- Position: Forward

Youth career
- MVLA Mercury Black
- DeAnza Force

College career
Years	Team	Apps	(Gls)
2015–2018	LMU Lions	71	(18)

Senior career*
Years	Team	Apps	(Gls)
2019	Sandvikens IF		
2020	Xinbei Hangyuan		
2021	San Francisco Nighthawks		
2021–2022	Elfen Saitama	13	(0)
2023	Illawarra Stingrays	6	(5)
2023	Western Sydney Wanderers	10	(1)
2023–2024	Newcastle Jets	20	(14)
2024–2025	Como	9	(1)

International career^{‡}
2018–	Philippines	52	(31)
Medal record
Women's football
Representing the Philippines
ASEAN Women's Championship
Winner	2022 Philippines	Team
Southeast Asian Games
Bronze medal – third place	2021 Vietnam	Team
- * Club domestic league appearances and goals as of 03:51, 20 December 2025 (UTC) ‡ National team caps and goals as of October 30, 2024 (UTC)

Sarina Isabel Calpo Bolden (born June 30, 1996) is a professional footballer. Born in the United States, she represents the Philippines at international level.

Bolden holds the distinction of having scored the first-ever FIFA Women's World Cup goal for the Philippines. On July 25, 2023, Bolden scored a header against co-host New Zealand to clinch the country's historic first World Cup win.

== Early life and education ==
Sarina Isabel Bolden was born on June 30, 1996 in Santa Clara, California, U.S. to Sherry and Robert Bolden and has a younger brother. Her mother is from Pangasinan. Her father is African American. Sarina's parents are both into sports, although soccer is not their main discipline.

She attended Milpitas High School and later the Loyola Marymount University where she obtained a business degree which she intends to use as a backup to her sporting career.

== Youth career ==
She played for Milpitas High School's women's soccer and softball teams. With the Milpitas High School Trojans, Bolden led her high school soccer team to the 2015 SCVAL El Camino Division title. She was named as part of the first team All-SCVAL selection for three years from 2013 to 2015.

In the club level, Bolden played for MVLA Mercury Black '96 helping the club reach the 2014 ECNL National Playoffs and helped the De Anza Force '95 win the 2013 and 2015 ECNL North West Conference championships.

== College career ==
Bolden attended the Loyola Marymount University where she played for the school's women's soccer team. In 2016 she scored six goals for her college team and she was named as part of the All-West Coast Conference First Team and the NSCAA All-West Region.

== Club career ==
Bolden in 2020 played for Xinbei Hangyuan in the Taiwan Mulan Football League. She later played for the San Francisco Nighthawks of the Women's Premier Soccer League in the United States.

In June 2021, Bolden was signed in by Elfen Saitama of the WE League of Japan. She debuted in Saitama's 1–4 lost to Tokyo Verdy Beleza on October 10, 2021, after she was brought in as a substitute in the 62nd minute. Bolden, whose native language is English, was limited on her ability to connect with her teammates.

In December 2022, Bolden mutually terminated her contract with Elfen Saitama and transferred to Australian club Western Sydney Wanderers.

Ahead of the 2023–24 A-League Women season, it was understood that Western Sydney Wanderers didn't re-sign Bolden. Bolden says she received offers from various clubs, but she preferred to remain in the A-League and not make any "big, far moves abroad" at that point in her career. For the meantime, she largely relied on playing time with the Philippine national team to maintain her fitness.

After five rounds of the 2023–24 season, Bolden was signed by Newcastle Jets and played the match the day she was signed, scoring a brace. Head coach Gary van Egmond would invite Bolden to join the team.

In August 2024, Bolden signed a contract to play for an unnamed Italian club. Two weeks later, Como announced Bolden as their new player, signing a contract that will keep her with the club until June 30, 2026. In April 2025, Bolden had an ACL injury while with Como. She underwent surgery in Australia the following month and has been recovering ever since. Three months after her injury, Bolden mutually terminated her contract with Como.

== International career ==
Bolden's performance with the Loyola Marymount University women's soccer team led to her being invited to participate in a training camp in Orlando, Florida in April 2017 which was organized by the United States women's national under-23 soccer team. In late 2017, she was able to participate in training camps organized by the Philippines women's national football team and caught the attention of Richard Boon, then head coach of the national team. She was later named in the final line up for the Philippine national team that participated at the 2018 AFC Women's Asian Cup.

In the Philippines' first group stage match against host Jordan, Bolden had her first international cap. She scored the winning goal for the Philippines in their 2–1 victory against the hosts.

Bolden was named in the lineup for the Philippine national team that participated at the 2022 AFC Women's Asian Cup. The Philippines advanced to the knockout stage of the AFC Women's Asian Cup for the first time. During the quarterfinals against Chinese Taipei, which ended in a penalty shoot-out following a 1–1 draw, Bolden scored the winning penalty which resulted in the Philippines qualifying for their first-ever FIFA Women's World Cup, the 2023 edition. On 25 July 2023, she scored the only goal in a 1–0 win over World Cup co-host New Zealand, to be her country's first ever goal and victory in the competition.

She would make her milestone 50th international cap after playing in a friendly against South Korea on April 5, 2024.

Having recently recovered from an injury, Bolden was included in the Philippine squad for the 2025 SEA Games in Thailand.

== Career statistics ==
=== Club ===
As of match played March 30, 2025

Appearances and goals by club, season and competition
Club	Season	League			National cup		League cup (Note: Includes WE League Cup)		Total	
Club	Season	Division	Apps	Goals	Apps	Goals	Apps	Goals	Apps	Goals
Elfen Saitama	2021–22	WE League	9	0	0	0	0	0	9	0
Elfen Saitama	2022–23	WE League	4	0	0	0	1	0	5	0
Elfen Saitama	Total		13	0	0	0	1	0	14	0
Western Sydney Wanderers	2022–23	A-League	10	1	–		–		10	1
Illawarra Stingrays	2023	NPL NSW	6	5	–		–		6	5
Newcastle Jets	2023–24	A-League	20	14	–		–		20	14
Como	2024–25	Serie A	9	1	–		–		9	1
Career total (Note: Statistics only include from 2021 with Elfen Saitama and onwards.)			58	21	0	0	1	0	59	21

=== International goals ===
Scores and results list the Philippines' goal tally first.

#	Date	Venue	Opponent	Score	Result	Competition
1.	April 6, 2018	Amman International Stadium, Amman, Jordan	Jordan	2–1	2–1	2018 AFC Women's Asian Cup
2.	November 29, 2019	Biñan Football Stadium, Biñan, Philippines	Malaysia	1–0	5–0	2019 Southeast Asian Games
3.	November 29, 2019	Biñan Football Stadium, Biñan, Philippines	Malaysia	3–0	5–0	2019 Southeast Asian Games
4.	November 29, 2019	Biñan Football Stadium, Biñan, Philippines	Malaysia	4–0	5–0	2019 Southeast Asian Games
5.	January 27, 2022	Shiv Chhatrapati Sports Complex, Pune, India	Indonesia	2–0	6–0	2022 AFC Women's Asian Cup
6.	May 9, 2022	Cẩm Phả Stadium, Cẩm Phả, Vietnam	Cambodia	2–0	5–0	2021 Southeast Asian Games
7.	May 21, 2022	Cẩm Phả Stadium, Cẩm Phả, Vietnam	Myanmar	1–1	2–1	2021 Southeast Asian Games
8.	June 23, 2022	Terme Čatež, Brežice, Slovenia	Bosnia and Herzegovina	2–0	3–0	Friendly
9.	June 23, 2022	Terme Čatež, Brežice, Slovenia	Bosnia and Herzegovina	3–0	3–0	Friendly
10.	July 6, 2022	Rizal Memorial Stadium, Manila, Philippines	Singapore	4–0	7–0	2022 AFF Women's Championship
11.	July 10, 2022	Rizal Memorial Stadium, Manila, Philippines	Indonesia	2–1	4–1	2022 AFF Women's Championship
12.	July 10, 2022	Rizal Memorial Stadium, Manila, Philippines	Indonesia	3–1	4–1	2022 AFF Women's Championship
13.	July 10, 2022	Rizal Memorial Stadium, Manila, Philippines	Indonesia	4–1	4–1	2022 AFF Women's Championship
14.	July 15, 2022	Rizal Memorial Stadium, Manila, Philippines	Vietnam	3–0	4–0	2022 AFF Women's Championship
15.	July 15, 2022	Rizal Memorial Stadium, Manila, Philippines	Vietnam	4–0	4–0	2022 AFF Women's Championship
16.	September 6, 2022	Titan Stadium, Fullerton, United States	New Zealand	1–0	1–2	Friendly
17.	April 5, 2023	Hisor Central Stadium, Hisar, Tajikistan	Pakistan	2–0	4–0	2024 AFC Women's Olympic Qualifying Tournament
18.	April 11, 2023	Hisor Central Stadium, Hisar, Tajikistan	Hong Kong	1–0	4–0	2024 AFC Women's Olympic Qualifying Tournament
19.	April 11, 2023	Hisor Central Stadium, Hisar, Tajikistan	Hong Kong	2–0	4–0	2024 AFC Women's Olympic Qualifying Tournament
20.	May 6, 2023	RCAF Old Stadium, Phnom Penh, Cambodia	Malaysia	1–0	1–0	2023 Southeast Asian Games
21.	May 9, 2023	RSN Stadium, Phnom Penh, Cambodia	Vietnam	1–0	2–1	2023 Southeast Asian Games
22.	July 25, 2023	Wellington Regional Stadium, Wellington, New Zealand	New Zealand	1–0	1–0	2023 FIFA Women's World Cup
23.	September 22, 2023	Wenzhou Sports Center Stadium, Wenzhou, China	Hong Kong	1–0	3–1	2022 Asian Games
24.	September 25, 2023	Wenzhou Sports Center Stadium, Wenzhou, China	South Korea	1–0	1–5	2022 Asian Games
25.	September 28, 2023	Wenzhou Sports Center Stadium, Wenzhou, China	Myanmar	1–0	3–0	2022 Asian Games
26.	September 30, 2023	Wenzhou Sports Center Stadium, Wenzhou, China	Japan	1–3	1–8	2022 Asian Games
27.	October 26, 2023	Perth Rectangular Stadium, Perth, Australia	Chinese Taipei	1–1	4–1	2024 AFC Women's Olympic Qualifying Tournament
28.	October 26, 2023	Perth Rectangular Stadium, Perth, Australia	Chinese Taipei	3–1	4–1	2024 AFC Women's Olympic Qualifying Tournament
29.	October 26, 2024	Emirhan Sport Complex, Antalya, Turkey	Jordan	1–0	3–0	2024 Pink Ladies Cup
30.	October 26, 2024	Emirhan Sport Complex, Antalya, Turkey	Jordan	2–0	3–0	2024 Pink Ladies Cup
31.	October 30, 2024	Emirhan Sport Complex, Antalya, Turkey	Kenya	1–2	1–4	2024 Pink Ladies Cup

== Honors ==
Philippines

- Southeast Asian Games third place: 2021
- ASEAN Women's Championship: 2022

Individual

- PSA Annual Awards Ms. Football: 2024
- PSC–PCW Women in Sports Awards Athlete of the year: 2024

== Personal life ==
Bolden is gay and a queer woman. Her cousins Jalen Brown and Ryanne Brown are also professional footballers.
