= Anicka Castañeda =

Filipino footballer (born 1999)

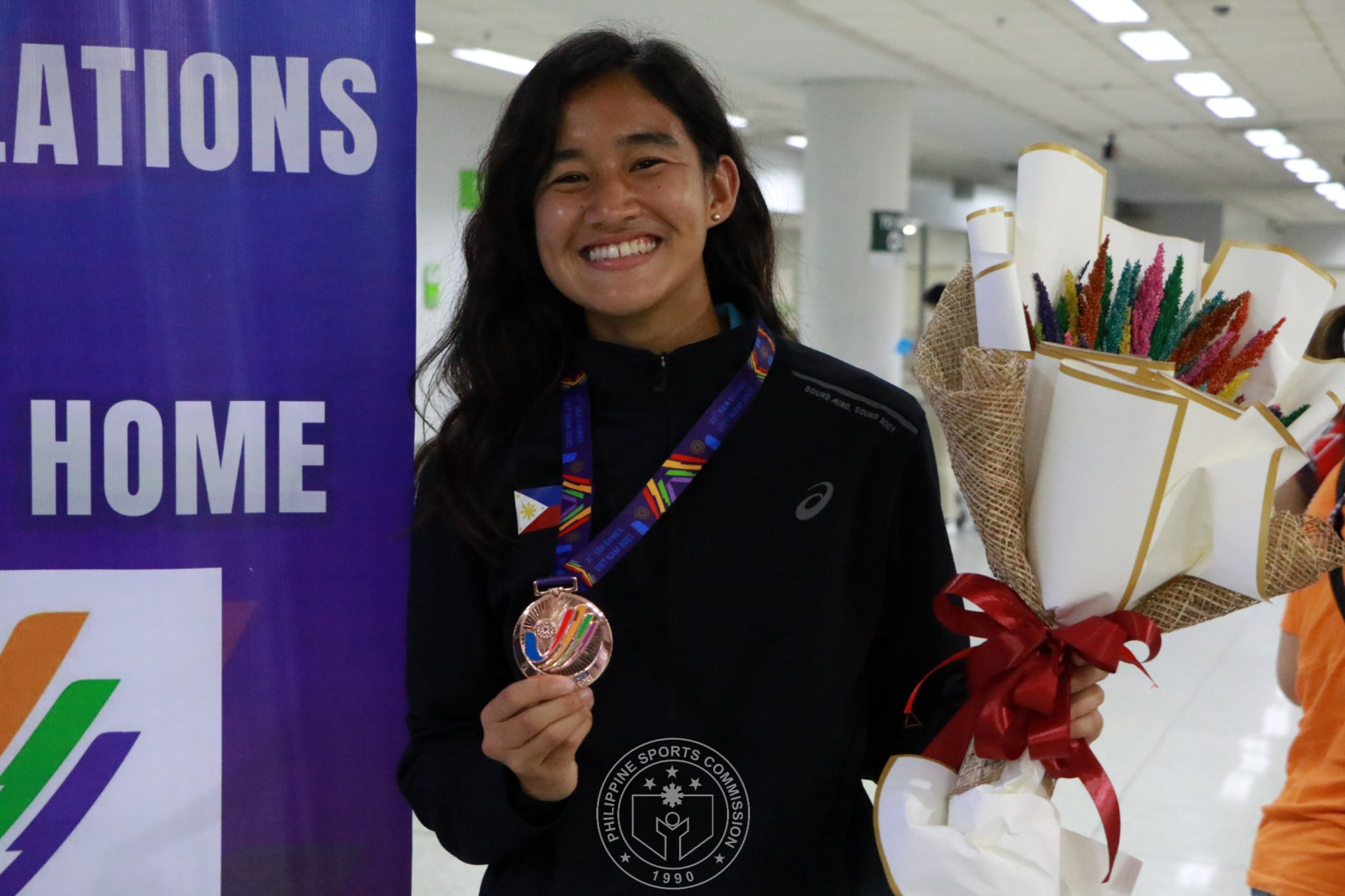
- Castañeda with her bronze medal from the 2021 Southeast Asian Games

Personal information
- Full name: Anicka Chabeli Arrieta Castañeda
- Date of birth: December 15, 1999 (age 26)
- Place of birth: Mandaluyong, Philippines
- Height: 5 ft 4 in (1.63 m)
- Position: Midfielder

Team information
- Current team: Taichung Blue Whale
- Number: 23

Youth career
- –2017: De La Salle Zobel
- 2017: National Capital Region

College career
Years	Team	Apps	(Gls)
2017–2022	De La Salle University		
2024-	De La Salle University		

Senior career*
Years	Team	Apps	(Gls)
2022–2023	Western City Rangers		
- Kaya–Iloilo
2026–	Taichung Blue Whale		

International career^{‡}
2017–	Philippines	43	(12)
Medal record
Women's football
Representing the Philippines
AFF Women's Championship
Winner	2022 Philippines	Team
Southeast Asian Games
Gold medal – first place	2025 Thailand	Team
Bronze medal – third place	2021 Vietnam	Team
- * Club domestic league appearances and goals ‡ National team caps and goals as of March 15, 2026

Anicka Chabeli Arrieta Castañeda (born December 15, 1999) is a Filipino professional footballer who plays as a midfielder for Taiwan Mulan Football League club Taichung Blue Whale and the Philippines women's national team.

== Personal life ==
Castañeda was born on December 16, 1999. She has a brother and an elder sister, Sara Castañeda, who is also a footballer and has played for the national team as well. She attended high school at De La Salle Zobel before moving to De La Salle University.

== Career ==
Castañeda played for the women's junior futsal team of De La Salle Zobel. She was named junior MVP at the WNCAA in 2016. She was also the captain of the National Capital Region team that played at the secondary girls event of the 2017 Palarong Pambansa.

Castañeda was part of the Philippines women's national football team that played at the 2018 AFC Women's Asian Cup qualification in April 2017. The national squad secured qualification with one match to spare by drawing Bahrain 1–1. She scored for the national team in a prior match against Tajikistan. Castañeda was also part of the team that competed at the 2017 Southeast Asian Games.

After high school, Castañeda joined the women's team of the De La Salle University but has yet to feature in the UAAP since Season 80. She was unavailable for Season 80 due to national team commitments while an injury made her unavailable for Season 81. Season 82 was cancelled due to the COVID-19 pandemic.

She would play for the Philippines at the 2022 AFC Women's Asian Cup, helping her squad qualify for their first-ever FIFA Women's World Cup in 2023. Along with Meryll Serrano, she was the only native-born Filipina on the World Cup squad; 18 of her 22 teammates were born in the United States.

=== International goals ===
Scores and results list the Philippines' goal tally first.

#	Date	Venue	Opponent	Score	Result	Competition
1.	April 7, 2017	Pamir Stadium, Dushanbe	Tajikistan	2–0	8–0	2018 AFC Women's Asian Cup qualification
2.	April 7, 2017	Pamir Stadium, Dushanbe	Tajikistan	7–0	8–0	2018 AFC Women's Asian Cup qualification
3.	April 7, 2022	Wanderers Football Park, Sydney	Fiji	2–0	7–2	Friendly
4.	April 7, 2022	Wanderers Football Park, Sydney	Fiji	6–0	7–2	Friendly
5.	April 22, 2022	Wanderers Football Park, Sydney	Tonga	5–0	16–0	Friendly
6.	April 22, 2022	Wanderers Football Park, Sydney	Tonga	11–0	16–0	Friendly
7.	April 30, 2022	Valentine Sports Park, Sydney	Tonga	2–0	5–0	Friendly
8.	April 30, 2022	Valentine Sports Park, Sydney	Tonga	3–0	5–0	Friendly
9.	May 9, 2022	Cẩm Phả Stadium, Cẩm Phả	Cambodia	5–0	5–0	2021 Southeast Asian Games
10.	July 6, 2022	Rizal Memorial Stadium, Manila	Singapore	7–0	7–0	2022 AFF Women's Championship
11.	July 8, 2022	Rizal Memorial Stadium, Manila	Malaysia	4–0	4–0	2022 AFF Women's Championship
12.	December 11, 2025	IPE Chonburi Stadium, Chonburi, Thailand	Malaysia	6–0	6–0	2025 SEA Games

== Honours ==
=== International ===
==== Philippines ====
- Southeast Asian Games: 2025
- AFF Women's Championship: 2022
