= Football at the 2021 SEA Games – Women's tournament =

2021 SEA Games Women's Football Tournament
Tournament details
- Host country: Vietnam
- Dates: 9–21 May 2022
- Teams: 7 (from 7 associations)
- Venue: 1 (in 1 host city)

Final positions
- Champions: Vietnam (7th title)
- Runners-up: Thailand
- Third place: Philippines
- Fourth place: Myanmar

Tournament statistics
- Matches played: 13
- Goals scored: 38 (2.92 per match)
- Top scorer(s): (Myanmar) Win Theingi Tun (Thailand) Taneekarn Dangda (4 goals each)

The women's football tournament at the 2021 SEA Games was held from 9–21 May 2022 in Vietnam. Seven Southeast Asian nations participated in the women's tournament. All matches were played in Quảng Ninh. There was no age limit for this tournament. Indonesia withdrew from the competition after the draw. Malaysia withdrew from the competition before the draw. Timor-Leste did not take part in the competition.

Vietnam won the tournament for the third time in a row, and the seventh time in total, successfully defending their titles in 2017 and 2019, by beating Thailand 1–0 in the final.

== Competition schedule ==
The following is the competition schedule for the women's football competition:

| G | Group stage | ½ | Semifinals | B | 3rd place play-off | F | Final |

| Event | Fri 6 | Sat 7 | Sun 8 | Mon 9 | Tue 10 | Wed 11 | Thu 12 | Fri 13 | Sat 14 | Sun 15 | Mon 16 | Tue 17 | Wed 18 | Thu 19 | Fri 20 | Sat 21 | | Sun 22 |
|---|---|---|---|---|---|---|---|---|---|---|---|---|---|---|---|---|---|---|
| Women | | | | G | G | G | | G | G | G | | | ½ | | | B | F | |

== Venues ==
| Football at the 2021 SEA Games – Women's tournament (Vietnam) | Quảng Ninh |
|---|---|
| Football at the 2021 SEA Games – Women's tournament (Vietnam) | Cẩm Phả Stadium |
| Football at the 2021 SEA Games – Women's tournament (Vietnam) | Capacity: 16,000 |

== Participating nations ==
- Cambodia
- Indonesia (W)
- Laos
- Myanmar
- Philippines
- Singapore
- Thailand
- Vietnam (host)

On 15 April 2022, Indonesia announced that they will withdraw from the tournament.

== Draw ==
The draw for the tournament will be held on 6 April 2022. 8 teams were seeded into 3 pots based on their performance in the previous two editions. The host, also the two time defending champion, Vietnam was automatically assigned into position A1. Thailand, as the runners-up in both of the previous two editions, was assigned into position B1.

On 15 April 2022, Indonesia announced that they will withdraw from the tournament.

| Pot 1 | Pot 2 | Pot 3 |
|---|---|---|
| Vietnam (H), (C); Thailand | Myanmar; Philippines | ~~Indonesia~~ (W); Laos; Singapore; Cambodia |

== Squads ==
Unlike the men's tournament which is an under-23 international tournament, the women's football tournament is for senior national teams.

== Group stage ==
=== Group A ===
| Pos | Team | Pld | W | D | L | GF | GA | GD | Pts | Qualification |
|---|---|---|---|---|---|---|---|---|---|---|
| 1 | Vietnam (H) | 2 | 2 | 0 | 0 | 9 | 1 | +8 | 6 | Advance to Semi-finals |
| 2 | Philippines | 2 | 1 | 0 | 1 | 6 | 2 | +4 | 3 | Advance to Semi-finals |
| 3 | Cambodia | 2 | 0 | 0 | 2 | 0 | 12 | −12 | 0 | |
| 4 | Indonesia (Note: On 15 April 2022, Indonesia announced that they will withdraw from the tournament.) | 0 | 0 | 0 | 0 | 0 | 0 | 0 | 0 | Withdrew |

Source: FIFA
(H) Hosts
Notes:
9 May 2022
19:00

| Philippines | 5–0 | Cambodia |
|---|---|---|
| Flanigan 27'; Bolden 64'; Madarang 68'; Quezada 76'; A. Castañeda 80' | Report |

Cẩm Phả Stadium, Quảng Ninh
Attendance: 5,120
Referee: Haruna Kanematsu (Japan)

| Vietnam | Cancelled | Indonesia |

Cẩm Phả Stadium, Quảng Ninh

| Cambodia | Cancelled | Indonesia |

Cẩm Phả Stadium, Quảng Ninh
11 May 2022
19:00

| Vietnam | 2–1 | Philippines |
|---|---|---|
| Nguyễn Thị Tuyết Dung 38'; Trần Thị Thùy Trang 51' | Report | Annis 15' |

Cẩm Phả Stadium, Quảng Ninh
Attendance: 16,100
Referee: Rebecca Durcau (Australia)

| Indonesia | Cancelled | Philippines |

Cẩm Phả Stadium, Quảng Ninh
14 May 2022
19:00

| Cambodia | 0–7 | Vietnam |
|---|---|---|
| | Report | Nguyễn Thị Vạn 6', 77'; Phạm Hải Yến 58' (pen.); Nguyễn Thị Tuyết Dung 65'; Trần Thị Thu 79'; Ngân Thị Vạn Sự 81'; Dương Thị Vân 87' |

Cẩm Phả Stadium, Quảng Ninh
Attendance: 16,000
Referee: Anna Sidorova (Uzbekistan)

=== Group B ===
| Pos | Team | Pld | W | D | L | GF | GA | GD | Pts | Qualification |
|---|---|---|---|---|---|---|---|---|---|---|
| 1 | Thailand | 3 | 2 | 1 | 0 | 9 | 1 | +8 | 7 | Advance to Semi-finals |
| 2 | Myanmar | 3 | 2 | 1 | 0 | 5 | 1 | +4 | 7 | Advance to Semi-finals |
| 3 | Singapore | 3 | 1 | 0 | 2 | 1 | 4 | −3 | 3 | |
| 4 | Laos | 3 | 0 | 0 | 3 | 0 | 9 | −9 | 0 | |

Source: FIFA
10 May 2022
21:30 (Note: Originally to be played at 16:00, the match was postponed and rescheduled due to heavy rain.)

| Myanmar | 3–0 | Laos |
|---|---|---|
| Win Theingi Tun 30'; Khin Marlar Tun 57', 68' | Report |

Cẩm Phả Stadium, Quảng Ninh
Referee: Choki Om (Bhutan)
10 May 2022
19:00

| Thailand | 3–0 | Singapore |
|---|---|---|
| Kanyanat 7'; Nutwadee 17'; Chatchawan 21' | Report |

Cẩm Phả Stadium, Quảng Ninh
Attendance: 5,000
Referee: Lê Thị Ly (Vietnam)
13 May 2022
16:00

| Laos | 0–1 | Singapore |
|---|---|---|
| | Report | Izzati 90+5' |

Cẩm Phả Stadium, Quảng Ninh
Referee: Esra'a Mahmoud (Jordan)
13 May 2022
19:00

| Thailand | 1–1 | Myanmar |
|---|---|---|
| Irravadee 13' | Report | Win Theingi Tun 79' |

Cẩm Phả Stadium, Quảng Ninh
Referee: Sultanat Norouzi (Iran)
15 May 2022
16:00

| Singapore | 0–1 | Myanmar |
|---|---|---|
| | Report | Win Theingi Tun 90+4' |

Cẩm Phả Stadium, Quảng Ninh
Referee: Esra'a Mahmoud (Jordan)
15 May 2022
19:00

| Laos | 0–5 | Thailand |
|---|---|---|
| | Report | Chatchawan 17'; Taneekarn 44', 60', 85'; Ploychompoo 57' |

Cẩm Phả Stadium, Quảng Ninh
Referee: Doumouh Al Bakkar (Lebanon)

== Knockout stage ==
Semi-finals
18 May – Quảng Ninh
Vietnam | 1
Myanmar | 0
18 May – Quảng Ninh
Thailand | 3
Philippines | 0

Gold medal match
21 May – Quảng Ninh
Vietnam | 1
Thailand | 0
Bronze medal match
21 May – Quảng Ninh
Myanmar | 1
Philippines | 2

=== Semi-finals ===
18 May 2022
15:30

| Thailand | 3–0 | Philippines |
|---|---|---|
| Silawan 22'; Taneekarn 47'; Ploychompoo 90+1' | Report |

Cẩm Phả Stadium, Quảng Ninh
Attendance: 3,565
Referee: Rebecca Durcau (Australia)
18 May 2022
19:00

| Vietnam | 1–0 | Myanmar |
|---|---|---|
| Huỳnh Như 28' | Report |

Cẩm Phả Stadium, Quảng Ninh
Attendance: 15,950
Referee: Haruna Kanematsu (Japan)

=== Bronze medal match ===
21 May 2022
16:00

| Myanmar | 1–2 | Philippines (bronze) |
|---|---|---|
| Win Theingi Tun 24' (pen.) | Report | Bolden 73'; Quezada 76' |

Cẩm Phả Stadium, Quảng Ninh
Attendance: 11,635
Referee: Lê Thị Ly (Vietnam)

=== Gold medal match ===
21 May 2022
19:00

| (gold) Vietnam | 1–0 | Thailand (silver) |
|---|---|---|
| Huỳnh Như 59' | Report |

Cẩm Phả Stadium, Quảng Ninh
Attendance: 16,020
Referee: Choki Om (Bhutan)

== Winners ==
2021 SEA Games Women's Tournament

Vietnam
Seventh title

== Goalscorers ==
There were 38 goals scored in 13 matches, for an average of 2.92 goals per match.

4 goals

- (Myanmar) Win Theingi Tun
- (Thailand) Taneekarn Dangda

2 goals

- (Myanmar) Khin Marlar Tun
- (Philippines) Sarina Bolden
- (Philippines) Quinley Quezada
- (Thailand) Chatchawan Rodthong
- (Thailand) Ploychompoo Somnuek
- (Vietnam) Huỳnh Như
- (Vietnam) Nguyễn Thị Tuyết Dung
- (Vietnam) Nguyễn Thị Vạn

1 goal

- (Philippines) Tahnai Annis
- (Philippines) Anicka Castañeda
- (Philippines) Isabella Flanigan
- (Philippines) Eva Madarang
- (Singapore) Nur Izzati Rosni
- (Thailand) Irravadee Makris
- (Thailand) Kanyanat Chetthabutr
- (Thailand) Nutwadee Pram-nak
- (Thailand) Silawan Intamee
- (Vietnam) Dương Thị Vân
- (Vietnam) Ngân Thị Vạn Sự
- (Vietnam) Phạm Hải Yến
- (Vietnam) Trần Thị Thu
- (Vietnam) Trần Thị Thùy Trang

== Final ranking ==
| Pos | Team | Pld | W | D | L | GF | GA | GD | Pts | Final result |
|---|---|---|---|---|---|---|---|---|---|---|
| 1 | Vietnam (H) | 4 | 4 | 0 | 0 | 11 | 1 | +10 | 12 | Gold Medal |
| 2 | Thailand | 5 | 3 | 1 | 1 | 12 | 2 | +10 | 10 | Silver Medal |
| 3 | Philippines | 4 | 2 | 0 | 2 | 8 | 6 | +2 | 6 | Bronze Medal |
| 4 | Myanmar | 5 | 2 | 1 | 2 | 6 | 4 | +2 | 7 | Fourth place |
| 5 | Singapore | 3 | 1 | 0 | 2 | 1 | 4 | −3 | 3 | Eliminated in group stage |
| 6 | Laos | 3 | 0 | 0 | 3 | 0 | 9 | −9 | 0 | Eliminated in group stage |
| 7 | Cambodia | 2 | 0 | 0 | 2 | 0 | 12 | −12 | 0 | Eliminated in group stage |
| 8 | Indonesia | 0 | 0 | 0 | 0 | 0 | 0 | 0 | 0 | Withdrew |

(H) Hosts

== See also ==
- Football at the 2021 SEA Games - Men's tournament
- Futsal at the 2021 SEA Games - Women's tournament
