= 2022 AFF Women's Championship =

Tournament details
- Host country: Philippines
- Cities: Manila, Biñan, Imus
- Dates: 4–17 July
- Teams: 11 (from 1 sub-confederation)
- Venues: 3 (in 3 host cities)

Final positions
- Champions: Philippines (1st title)
- Runners-up: Thailand
- Third place: Myanmar
- Fourth place: Vietnam

Tournament statistics
- Matches played: 29
- Goals scored: 108 (3.72 per match)
- Attendance: 19,752 (681 per match)
- Top scorer(s): (Philippines) Sarina Bolden (Vietnam) Huỳnh Như (7 goals each)

The 2022 AFF Women's Championship was the 12th edition of the AFF Women's Championship, an international women's football tournament organised by the ASEAN Football Federation (AFF). The final tournament was originally scheduled to run from 3 to 17 July 2020. However, the tournament was postponed indefinitely due to the COVID-19 pandemic. The tournament was later rescheduled and was held from 4 to 17 July 2022 in the Philippines.

Vietnam were the defending champions, but failed to defend the title after losing 0–4 to the Philippines in the semi-finals. The hosts went on to win their first title in history by defeating Thailand 3–0 in the final.

== Participating nations ==
Eleven teams entered the AFF Women's Championship final tournament. Australia sent its under-23 squad to compete in the tournament.

Team	Appearance	Previous best performance
Australia U23	1st	Debut
Cambodia	3rd	Group stage (2018, 2019)
Indonesia	9th	Fourth place (2004)
Laos	7th	Fourth place (2011, 2012)
Malaysia	10th	Fourth place (2007)
Myanmar	12th	Champions (2004, 2007)
Philippines (host)	11th	Fourth place (2019)
Singapore	9th	Group stage (2004, 2007, 2008, 2011, 2012, 2016, 2018, 2019)
Thailand	11th	Champions (2011, 2015, 2016, 2018)
Timor-Leste	4th	Group stage (2016, 2018, 2019)
Vietnam	12th	Champions (2006, 2012, 2019)

== Draw ==
The draw for the 2022 AFF Women's Championship was held on May 28, 2022, at the Marco Polo Ortigas Manila in Pasig. The teams were allocated into five pots based on their performances in the last edition of the tournament. Ten teams were first drawn into two groups of five teams. Malaysia, the eleventh team was drawn separately, making one of the two groups have six teams after the whole draw was finalized.

Pot 1	Pot 2	Pot 3	Pot 4	Pot 5	Eleventh team
1. Vietnam (2019 holders); 2. Thailand	3. Myanmar; 4. Philippines (host)	5. Indonesia; 6. Timor-Leste	7. Singapore; 8. Cambodia	9. Laos; 10. Australia U23	11. Malaysia

== Venues ==
Matches were held in three venues.

Manila	Biñan	Imus	2022 AFF Women's Championship (Calabarzon)
Rizal Memorial Stadium	Biñan Football Stadium	City of Imus Grandstand	2022 AFF Women's Championship (Calabarzon)
Capacity: 12,873	Capacity: 3,000	Capacity: 2,500	2022 AFF Women's Championship (Calabarzon)

== Group stage ==
Tiebreakers

Ranking in each group shall be determined as follows:

1. Greater number of points obtained in all the group matches;
2. Goal difference in all the group matches;
3. Greater number of goals scored in all the group matches;
4. Greater disciplinary points.

If two or more teams are equal on the basis on the above four criteria, the place shall be determined as follows:

1. Result of the direct match between the teams concerned;
2. Penalty shoot-out if only the teams are tied, and they met in the last round of the group;
3. Drawing lots by the Organising Committee.

All times listed are Philippine Standard Time (UTC+08:00)

=== Group A ===
Pos	Team	Pld	W	D	L	GF	GA	GD	Pts	Qualification
1	Thailand	5	4	1	0	14	2	+12	13	Knockout stage
2	Philippines (H)	5	4	0	1	16	2	+14	12	Knockout stage
3	Australia U23	5	3	1	1	16	4	+12	10	
4	Singapore	5	1	1	3	3	14	−11	4	
5	Malaysia	5	0	2	3	1	15	−14	2	
6	Indonesia	5	0	1	4	2	15	−13	1	

Source: PFF
Rules for classification: Group stage tiebreakers
(H) Hosts
4 July 2022
16:00

Singapore	0–0	Malaysia
	Report

Rizal Memorial Stadium, Manila
Attendance: 235
Referee: Aung Seinn Cho (Myanmar)
4 July 2022
19:00

Philippines	1–0	Australia U23
Bolden 60'	Report

Rizal Memorial Stadium, Manila
Attendance: 1,408
Referee: Thein Thein Aye (Myanmar)
4 July 2022
19:00

Indonesia	0–4	Thailand
	Report	Alisa 3', 88'; Tipkritta 10'; Fasawang 69'

Biñan Football Stadium, Biñan
Attendance: 0
Referee: Công Thị Dung (Vietnam)

6 July 2022
16:00

Thailand	2–2	Australia U23
Kanyanat 41'; Ploychompoo 60'	Report	Sayer 18'; Hawkesby 26' (pen.)

Rizal Memorial Stadium, Manila
Attendance: 207
Referee: Bùi Thị Thu Trang (Vietnam)
6 July 2022
19:00

Philippines	7–0	Singapore
Flanigan 9'; Ernie 10' (o.g.); Annis 19'; Bolden 38'; Eggesvik 47'; Hawkinson 56'; Castañeda 69'	Report

Rizal Memorial Stadium, Manila
Attendance: 647
Referee: Supiree Testhomya (Thailand)
6 July 2022
19:00

Indonesia	1–1	Malaysia
Sheva 74'	Report	Steffi 90+2'

Biñan Football Stadium, Biñan
Referee: Plong Pichakara (Cambodia)

8 July 2022
16:00

Australia U23	4–0	Indonesia
Sayer 9', 13', 15', 44'	Report

Rizal Memorial Stadium, Manila
Referee: Aung Seinn Cho (Myanmar)
8 July 2022
19:00

Malaysia	0–4	Philippines
	Report	Eggesvik 32'; Guillou 42'; Quezada 49'; Castañeda 73'

Rizal Memorial Stadium, Manila
Attendance: 429
Referee: Thein Thein Aye (Myanmar)
8 July 2022
19:00

Thailand	3–0	Singapore
Saengrawee 22'; Tipkritta 49'; Jiraporn 72'	Report

Biñan Football Stadium, Biñan
Attendance: 0
Referee: Công Thị Dung (Vietnam)

10 July 2022
16:00

Singapore	1–4	Australia U23
Lincoln 89' (o.g.)	Report	Heatley 11'; Hunter 17'; Lowry 47'; Gallagher 70'

Rizal Memorial Stadium, Manila
Attendance: 334
Referee: Supiree Testhomya (Thailand)
10 July 2022
19:00

Philippines	4–1	Indonesia
Annis 48'; Bolden 58', 65', 67'	Report	Carla 38'

Rizal Memorial Stadium, Manila
Attendance: 1,464
Referee: Bùi Thị Thu Trang (Vietnam)
10 July 2022
19:00

Malaysia	0–4	Thailand
	Report	Ploychompoo 25'; Pattaranan 55'; U-raiporn 74'; Nutwadee 86'

Biñan Football Stadium, Biñan
Attendance: 32
Referee: Plong Pichakara (Cambodia)

12 July 2022
19:00

Thailand	1–0	Philippines
Kanyanat 75'	Report

Rizal Memorial Stadium, Manila
Attendance: 2,923
Referee: Thein Thein Aye (Myanmar)
12 July 2022
19:00

Indonesia	0–2	Singapore
	Report	Izzati 45+1'; Syazwani 90+2'

Biñan Football Stadium, Biñan
Attendance: 58
Referee: Bùi Thị Thu Trang (Vietnam)
12 July 2022
19:00

Australia U23	6–0	Malaysia
Dawber 13', 24'; Hawkesby 20', 66', 68'; McNamara 82'	Report

City of Imus Grandstand, Imus
Attendance: 0
Referee: Công Thị Dung (Vietnam)

=== Group B ===
Pos	Team	Pld	W	D	L	GF	GA	GD	Pts	Qualification
1	Vietnam	4	4	0	0	18	0	+18	12	Knockout stage
2	Myanmar	4	3	0	1	13	5	+8	9	Knockout stage
3	Cambodia	4	1	1	2	4	8	−4	4	
4	Laos	4	1	1	2	4	9	−5	4	
5	Timor-Leste	4	0	0	4	1	18	−17	0	

Source: PFF
Rules for classification: Group stage tiebreakers
5 July 2022
16:00

Timor-Leste	0–7	Myanmar
	Report	Naw Htet Htet Wai 15'; July Kyaw 19', 33'; Khin Marlar Tun 38'; Wai Phoo Eain 45+1'; Myat Noe Khin 59' (pen.), 83'

Biñan Football Stadium, Biñan
Attendance: 23
Referee: Sunita Thongthawin (Thailand)
5 July 2022
19:00

Laos	1–1	Cambodia
Phimpha 21'	Report	Kunthea 90+1' (pen.)

Biñan Football Stadium, Biñan
Attendance: 110
Referee: Pansa Chaisanit (Thailand)

7 July 2022
16:00

Laos	2–0	Timor-Leste
Vady 14'; Aphatsala 84'	Report

Biñan Football Stadium, Biñan
Attendance: 62
Referee: Jhesa Mae Kaatz (Philippines)
7 July 2022
19:00

Cambodia	0–3	Vietnam
	Report	Ngân Thị Vạn Sự 19'; Phạm Hải Yến 32' (pen.); Nguyễn Thị Thanh Nhã 45+1'

Biñan Football Stadium, Biñan
Attendance: 0
Referee: Supiree Testhomya (Thailand)

9 July 2022
16:00

Myanmar	3–0	Cambodia
Khin Marlar Tun 32'; Myat Noe Khin 61'; Khin Moe Wai 87'	Report

Biñan Football Stadium, Biñan
Attendance: 0
Referee: Sunita Thongthawin (Thailand)
9 July 2022
19:00

Vietnam	5–0	Laos
Phạm Hoàng Quỳnh 42'; Huỳnh Như 45+1', 72'; Phạm Hải Yến 57', 65'	Report

Biñan Football Stadium, Biñan
Attendance: 43
Referee: Pansa Chaisanit (Thailand)

11 July 2022
16:00

Myanmar	3–1	Laos
Panatida 39' (o.g.); Khin Marlar Tun 47'; July Kyaw 64'	Report	Aphatsala 66'

Biñan Football Stadium, Biñan
Attendance: 65
Referee: Jhesa Mae Kaatz (Philippines)
11 July 2022
19:00

Timor-Leste	0–6	Vietnam
	Report	Huỳnh Như 11', 42'; Ngân Thị Vạn Sự 31', 72'; Nguyễn Thị Tuyết Dung 37' (pen.); Trần Thị Thùy Trang 84'

Biñan Football Stadium, Biñan
Attendance: 34
Referee: Keomany Phengmeuangkhoun (Laos)

13 July 2022
19:00

Cambodia	3–1	Timor-Leste
Sreyphors 1'; Vipha 25'; Sivhorng 45'	Report	Brigida 76'

City of Imus Grandstand, Imus
Attendance: 31
Referee: Jhesa Mae Kaatz (Philippines)
13 July 2022
19:00

Vietnam	4–0	Myanmar
Nguyễn Thị Tuyết Dung 15', 36' (pen.); Huỳnh Như 45+1'; Phạm Hải Yến 89'	Report

Rizal Memorial Stadium, Manila
Attendance: 157
Referee: Pansa Chaisanit (Thailand)

== Knockout stage ==
Semi-finals
15 July – Manila
Thailand	2
Myanmar	0
15 July – Manila
Vietnam	0
Philippines	4

Final
17 July – Manila
Thailand	0
Philippines	3
Third Place
17 July – Manila
Myanmar	4
Vietnam	3

=== Semi-finals ===
15 July 2022
16:00

Thailand	2–0	Myanmar
Kanyanat 45'; Saowalak 82'	Report

Rizal Memorial Stadium, Manila
15 July 2022
20:00

Vietnam	0–4	Philippines
		Long 31'; Annis 51' (pen.); Bolden 61', 70'

Rizal Memorial Stadium, Manila
Attendance: 3,233

=== Third place match ===
17 July 2022
16:00

Myanmar	4–3	Vietnam
San Thaw Thaw 9', 56', 86'; Lin Myint Mo 83'		Huỳnh Như 23', 39'; Phạm Hải Yến 80'

Rizal Memorial Stadium, Manila
Referee: Supiree Testhomya (Thailand)

=== Final ===
17 July 2022
19:30

Thailand	0–3	Philippines
	Report	Cowart 8'; Guillou 20'; Tipkritta 89' (o.g.)

Rizal Memorial Stadium, Manila
Attendance: 8,257
Referee: Bùi Thị Thu Trang (Vietnam)

== Goalscorers ==
There were 108 goals scored in 29 matches, for an average of 3.72 goals per match.

7 goals

- (Philippines) Sarina Bolden
- (Vietnam) Huỳnh Như

5 goals

- (Australia) Amy Sayer
- (Vietnam) Phạm Hải Yến

4 goals

- (Australia) Mackenzie Hawkesby

3 goals

- (Myanmar) July Kyaw
- (Myanmar) Khin Marlar Tun
- (Myanmar) Myat Noe Khin
- (Myanmar) San Thaw Thaw
- (Philippines) Tahnai Annis
- (Thailand) Kanyanat Chetthabutr
- (Vietnam) Ngân Thị Vạn Sự
- (Vietnam) Nguyễn Thị Tuyết Dung

2 goals

- (Australia) Chelsie Dawber
- (Laos) Aphatsala Chanthavongxay
- (Philippines) Anicka Castañeda
- (Philippines) Sara Eggesvik
- (Philippines) Katrina Guillou
- (Thailand) Alisa Rukpinij
- (Thailand) Ploychompoo Somnuek
- (Thailand) Tipkritta Onsamai

1 goal

- (Australia) Sheridan Gallagher
- (Australia) Winonah Heatley
- (Australia) Sarah Hunter
- (Australia) Hana Lowry
- (Australia) Matilda McNamara
- (Cambodia) Poeurn Kunthea
- (Cambodia) Kiet Sivhorng
- (Cambodia) Phoeurng Sreyphors
- (Cambodia) Soeurn Vipha
- (Indonesia) Carla Bio
- (Indonesia) Sheva Imut Furyzcha
- (Laos) Vady Inthiya
- (Laos) Phimpha Thongsavang
- (Malaysia) Steffi Sarge Kaur
- (Myanmar) Khin Moe Wai
- (Myanmar) Lin Mynt Mo
- (Myanmar) Naw Htet Htet Wai
- (Myanmar) Wai Phoo Eain
- (Philippines) Jessika Cowart
- (Philippines) Isabella Flanigan
- (Philippines) Kaya Hawkinson
- (Philippines) Hali Long
- (Philippines) Quinley Quezada
- (Singapore) Izzati Rosni
- (Singapore) Syazwani Ruzi
- (Thailand) Fasawang Ketkaew
- (Thailand) Jiraporn Mongkoldee
- (Thailand) Nutwadee Pram-nak
- (Thailand) Pattanaran Aupachai
- (Thailand) Saengrawee Meekham
- (Thailand) Saowalak Pengngam
- (Thailand) U-raiporn Yongkul
- (Timor-Leste) Brigida da Costa
- (Vietnam) Nguyễn Thị Thanh Nhã
- (Vietnam) Phạm Hoàng Quỳnh
- (Vietnam) Trần Thị Thùy Trang

1 own goal

- (Australia) Chloe Lincoln (against Singapore)
- (Laos) Panatida Phothisane (against Myanmar)
- (Singapore) Ernie Sulastri (against the Philippines)
- (Thailand) Tipkritta Onsamai (against the Philippines)

== Awards ==
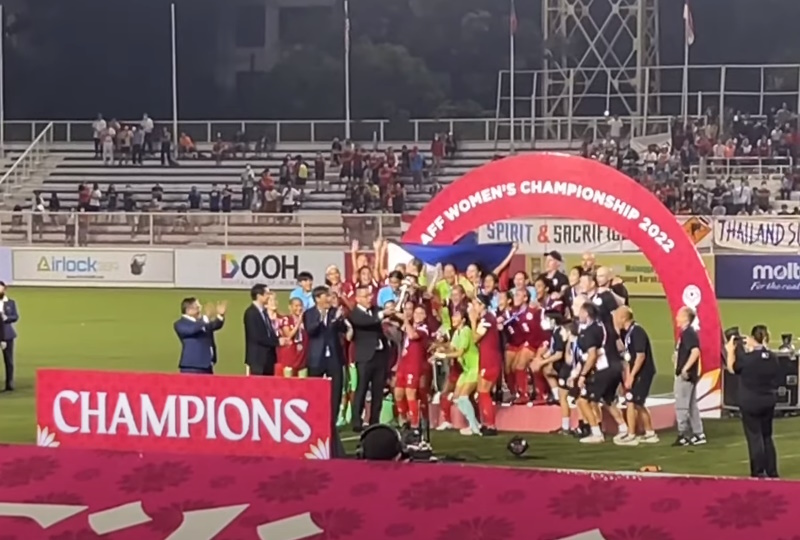
The Philippine national team being recognized for winning the title.

2022 AFF Women's Championship Champions
(Philippines)
Philippines
First title

== Final ranking ==
Pos	Team	Pld	W	D	L	GF	GA	GD	Pts	Final result
1	Philippines (H)	7	6	0	1	23	2	+21	18	Champions
2	Thailand	7	5	1	1	16	5	+11	16	Runners-up
3	Myanmar	6	4	0	2	17	10	+7	12	Third place
4	Vietnam	6	4	0	2	21	8	+13	12	Fourth place
5	Australia U23	5	3	1	1	16	4	+12	10	Eliminated in group stage
6	Cambodia	4	1	1	2	4	8	−4	4	Eliminated in group stage
7	Laos	4	1	1	2	4	9	−5	4	Eliminated in group stage
8	Singapore	5	1	1	3	3	14	−11	4	Eliminated in group stage
9	Malaysia	5	0	2	3	1	15	−14	2	Eliminated in group stage
10	Indonesia	5	0	1	4	2	15	−13	1	Eliminated in group stage
11	Timor-Leste	4	0	0	4	1	18	−17	0	Eliminated in group stage

Source: PFF
(H) Hosts

== See also ==
- 2022 AFC Women's Asian Cup
- 2022 CAFA Women's Championship
- 2022 EAFF E-1 Football Championship (women)
- 2022 SAFF Women's Championship
- 2022 WAFF Women's Championship
