= Philippines women's national football team results (2010–2019) =

- Win Draw Loss

This is a list of the Philippines women's national football team results from 2010 to 2019.

== Results ==
=== 2011 ===
| October 17 2011 AFF Championship GS | Myanmar | 2–0 | Philippines | Vientiane, Laos |
| 16:00 UTC+7 | My Nilar Htwe 4', 44' | Report | | Stadium: New Laos National Stadium |

| October 19 2011 AFF Championship GS | Philippines | 1–5 | Thailand | Vientiane, Laos |
| 16:00 UTC+7 | Nierras 85' | Report | Junpen 10'; Kanjana 29'; Sunisa 44'; Nisa 50', 53' | Stadium: New Laos National Stadium |

| October 21 2011 AFF Championship GS | Philippines | 2–2 | Malaysia | Vientiane, Laos |
| 19:00 UTC+7 | Rodriguez 20'; Nierras 85' | Report | Kais 48'; Fatin 58' | Stadium: New Laos National Stadium |

=== 2012 ===
| September 13 2012 AFF Women's Championship GS | Myanmar | 3–0 | Philippines | Ho Chi Minh City |
| | San San Maw 5', 82' (pen.); Nilar Myint 38' | Report | | Stadium: Thống Nhất Stadium; Referee: Rita Gani (Malaysia) |

| September 15 2012 AFF Women's Championship GS | Philippines | 2–4 | Vietnam | Ho Chi Minh City |
| | Cooke 53', 89' | Report | Nguyen Thi Muon 17'; Nguyen Thi Kim Tien 25'; Le Thu Thanh Huong 61'; Nguyen Thi Tuyet Dung 66' | Stadium: Thống Nhất Stadium; Referee: Kate Jacewicz (Australia) |

| September 17 2012 AFF Women's Championship GS | Philippines | 7–2 | Singapore | Ho Chi Minh City |
| | Cooke 37', 55', 57'; P. Impelido 19'; Magdolot 75'; Nierras 76'; Komarc 90' | Report | Kamaliah 71', 77' | Stadium: Thống Nhất Stadium |

| November 23 2012 LA Vikings Cup | Metro Stars (United States) | 0–1 | Philippines | Los Angeles |
| | | Report 1, 2 | Schmitt | Stadium: Casey Field, Los Angeles Harbor College |

| November 24 2012 LA Vikings Cup | California Cosmos (United States) | 3–3 | Philippines | Los Angeles |
| | Domínguez 3x' | Report 1, 2 | Park ? | Stadium: Casey Field, Los Angeles Harbor College |

| November 25 2012 LA Vikings Cup | Leon (United States) | 1–8 | Philippines | Downey, California |
| | ? | Report 1, 2 | Shugg 5x' Cook; Park; Impelido | Stadium: Allen Leyne Stadium, Downey High School |

| November 27 2012 LA Vikings Cup | California Cosmos (United States) | 1–1 (3–4 p) | Philippines | Santa Ana, California |
| | | Report | | Stadium: Santa Ana Stadium |

=== 2013 ===
| May 21 2014 AFC Women's Asian Cup qualification | Iran | 0–6 | Philippines | Dhaka |
| | | Report | Cooke 1'; Jurado 3'; Shugg 4', 90+2'; Kamangar 33' (o.g.); Houplin 40' | Stadium: Bangabandhu National Stadium; Attendance: 1,200; Referee: Kate Jacewicz (Australia) |

| May 23 2014 AFC Women's Asian Cup qualification | Philippines | 0–1 | Thailand | Dhaka |
| | | Report | Nisa 37' | Stadium: Bangabandhu National Stadium; Attendance: 700; Referee: Sachiko Yamagishi (Japan) |

| May 25 2014 AFC Women's Asian Cup qualification | Philippines | 4–0 | Bangladesh | Dhaka |
| | Park 19', 90+5'; Delos Reyes 29'; Barnekow 85' | Report | | Stadium: Bangabandhu National Stadium; Attendance: 700; Referee: Kate Jacewicz (Australia) |

| September 10 2013 AFF Women's Championship GS | Indonesia | 0–6 | Philippines | Yangon |
| | | Report | Houplin 7', 47', 73'; Wilson 51'; Cooke 79'; Park 85' | Stadium: Thuwunna Stadium; Referee: Rita Gani (Malaysia) |

| September 12 2013 AFF Women's Championship GS | Philippines | 1–4 | Japan U23 | Yangon |
| | Impelido 85' | Report | Tanaka 4'; Takahashi 20'; Hashiura 45+1'; Imai 79' | Stadium: Thuwunna Stadium; Referee: Rita Gani (Malaysia) |

| September 14 2013 AFF Women's Championship GS | Myanmar | 5–1 | Philippines | Yangon |
| | Moe Moe War 2'; Khin Moe Wai 21', 37', 86'; Yee Yee Oo 53' | Report | Houplin 75' | Stadium: Thuwunna Stadium |

| September 18 2013 AFF Women's Championship GS | Philippines | 7–2 | Laos | Yangon |
| | Houplin 1', 3', 7', 31'; Alquiros 59'; Baysa 69'; Soriano 80' | Report | Phonharath 76' (pen.); Sengmany 90' (pen.) | Stadium: Aung San Stadium |

| December 10 2013 Southeast Asian Games GS | Myanmar | 2–0 | Philippines | Mandalay |
| | Khin Marlar Tun 29'; Than Than Htwe 60' | Report | | Stadium: Mandalarthiri Stadium; Referee: Rita Gani (Malaysia) |

| December 13 2013 Southeast Asian Games GS | Philippines | 0–7 | Vietnam | Mandalay |
| | | Report | Nguyễn Thị Muôn 8', 61'; Nguyễn Thị Minh Nguyệt 10', 70'; Trần Thị Kim Hồng 60'; Nguyễn Thị Tuyết Dung 73'; Huỳnh Như 83' | Stadium: Mandalarthiri Stadium; Referee: Maria Piedade Rebello (India) |

=== 2015 ===
| May 2 2015 AFF Women's Championship GS | Malaysia | 0–3 | Philippines | Ho Chi Minh City |
| 16:00 (UTC+9) | | Report | Shugg 23'; Houplin 72', 75' | Stadium: Thống Nhất Stadium; Referee: Mai Hoang Trang (Vietnam) |

| May 4 2015 AFF Women's Championship GS | Myanmar | 4–1 | Philippines | Ho Chi Minh City |
| 16:00 (UTC+9) | Phaw 50', 53', 74'; Wai 66' | Report | Houplin 21' | Stadium: Thống Nhất Stadium; Attendance: 130; Referee: Rita Gani (Malaysia) |

| May 6 2015 AFF Women's Championship GS | Philippines | 0–4 | Vietnam | Ho Chi Minh City |
| 16:00 (UTC+9) | | Report | Minh Nguyệt 3', 27', 38' (pen.); Thùy Trang 11' | Stadium: Thống Nhất Stadium; Attendance: 2000; Referee: Rita Gani (Malaysia) |

=== 2016 ===
| July 26 2016 AFF Women's Championship GS | Thailand | 4–0 | Philippines | Mandalay |
| 15:00 (UTC+6:30) | Pitsamai 21', 31'; Kanjana 51'; Rattikan 68' | Report | | Stadium: Mandalarthiri Stadium; Referee: Oh Hyeon Jeong (South Korea) |

| July 28 2016 AFF Women's Championship GS | Philippines | 0–4 | Vietnam | Mandalay |
| 15:00 (UTC+6:30) | | Report | Hòa 7'; Tuyết Dung 30', 71'; Minh Nguyệt 80' | Stadium: Mandalarthiri Stadium |

| July 30 2016 AFF Women's Championship GS | Philippines | 2–0 | Singapore | Mandalay |
| 18:00 (UTC+6:30) | De Los Reyes 5'; Wilson 50' | Report | | Stadium: Mandalarthiri Stadium |

=== 2017 ===
| April 3 2018 AFC Women's Asian Cup qualification | Philippines | 4–0 | United Arab Emirates | Dushanbe |
| 19:00 | Madarang 14', 45+1'; Navaja 49'; S. Castañeda 54' | Report | | Stadium: Pamir Stadium; Attendance: 40; Referee: Mahsa Ghorbani (Iran) |

| April 5 2018 AFC Women's Asian Cup qualification | Philippines | 4–0 | Iraq | Dushanbe |
| 13:00 | Madarang 21'; Long 44'; S. Castañeda 45+1'; Dolino 45+3' | Report | | Stadium: Pamir Stadium; Attendance: 50; Referee: Anna Sidorova (Uzbekistan) |

| April 7 2018 AFC Women's Asian Cup qualification | Tajikistan | 0–8 | Philippines | Dushanbe |
| 16:00 | | Report | Madarang 17'; A. Castañeda 34', 85'; Long 38', 59', 84'; S. Castañeda 48'; Duran 90' | Stadium: Pamir Stadium; Attendance: 120; Referee: Yoshimi Yamashita (Japan) |

| April 10 2018 AFC Women's Asian Cup qualification | Philippines | 1–1 | Bahrain | Dushanbe |
| 19:00 | 82'; S. Castañeda | Report | 55'; Al-Dossary | Stadium: Pamir Stadium; Attendance: 50; Referee: Rebecca Durcau (Australia) |

| April 12 2018 AFC Women's Asian Cup qualification | Jordan | 5–1 | Philippines | Dushanbe |
| 13:00 | Al-Masri 15', 48'; Jbarah 29', 37'; Al-Naber 67' | Report | Del Campo 90+1' | Stadium: Pamir Stadium; Attendance: 110; Referee: Yoshimi Yamashita (Japan) |

| August 15 2017 Southeast Asian Games GS | Malaysia | 1–2 | Philippines | Shah Alam |
| 20:45 | Rofinus 51' | Report | Impelido 45'; Rodriguez 73' | Stadium: UiTM Stadium; Referee: Law Bik Chi (Hong Kong) |

| August 17 2017 Southeast Asian Games GS | Philippines | 0–3 | Vietnam | Kuala Lumpur |
| 16:00 | | Report | Huỳnh Như 65'; Dung 84'; Muôn 90+4' | Stadium: UM Arena Stadium; Referee: Yu Hong (China) |

| August 22 2017 Southeast Asian Games GS | Myanmar | 6–0 | Philippines | Kuala Lumpur |
| 16:00 | Khin Moe Wai 4', 80', 90+4'; Win Theingi Tun 16'; Yee Yee Oo 18'; Naw Ar Lo Wer Phaw 19' | Report | | Stadium: UM Arena Stadium |

| August 24 2017 Southeast Asian Games GS | Thailand | 3–1 | Philippines | Shah Alam |
| 16:00 | Rattikan 7'; Nisa 64'; Pitsamai 72' | Report | Long 90+1' | Stadium: UiTM Stadium |

=== 2018 ===
| January 6 Friendly | Temecula FC (United States) | 0–0 | Philippines | Temecula |
| 17:15 | | | | Stadium: Chaparral High School |

| January 6 Friendly | LA Galaxy San Diego (United States) | 5–0 | Philippines | Temecula |
| 19:00 | | | | Stadium: Chaparral High School |

| March Friendly | Osaka Univ. of Health and Sports Science (Japan) | 1–2 | Philippines | Osaka |
| | | Report |

| March Friendly | FC Sperenza (Japan) | 2–3 | Philippines | Osaka |
| | ? | Report | Miclat; Park; Quezada |

| April 6 2018 AFC Women's Asian Cup GS | Jordan | 1–2 | Philippines | Amman |
| 20:00 | Jbarah 15' | Report | Khair 51' (o.g.); Bolden 76' | Stadium: Amman International Stadium; Attendance: 9,473; Referee: Ri Hyang-ok (North Korea) |

| April 9 2018 AFC Women's Asian Cup GS | Philippines | 0–3 | China | Amman |
| 16:45 | | Report | Ma Jun 31'; Li Ying 17', 57' | Stadium: King Abdullah II Stadium; Attendance: 226; Referee: Casey Reibelt (Australia) |

| April 12 2018 AFC Women's Asian Cup GS | Thailand | 3–1 | Philippines | Amman |
| 20:00 | Kanjana 28' (pen.), 53'; Silawan 62' | Report | Shugg 90+3' | Stadium: King Abdullah II Stadium; Referee: Oh Hyeon-jeong (South Korea) |

| April 16 2018 AFC Women's Asian Cup 5th place | Philippines | 0–5 | South Korea | Amman |
| 20:00 | | | Jang Sel-gi 34'; Lee Min-a 45+3'; Lim Seon-joo 56'; Cho So-hyun 66', 84' (pen.) | Stadium: Amman International Stadium; Attendance: 418; Referee: Casey Reibelt (Australia) |

| July 1 2018 AFF Women's Championship GS | Philippines | 0–4 | Myanmar | Palembang |
| 16:00 | | Report | Naw Ar Lo Wer Phaw 2'; Khin Moe Wai 23'; Win Theingi Tun 49'; July Kyaw 59' | Stadium: Jakabaring Stadium; Attendance: 150; Referee: Rebecca Durcau (Australia |

| July 3 2018 AFF Women's Championship GS | Singapore | 0–3 | Philippines | Palembang |
| 19:00 | | Report | Semacio 6'; Umairah 60' (o.g.); Quezada 77' | Stadium: Jakabaring Stadium; Attendance: 100; Referee: Fatmawati Deliana (Indonesia) |

| July 7 2018 AFF Women's Championship GS | Philippines | 0–5 | Vietnam | Palembang |
| 19:00 | | Report | Vạn 1'; Huỳnh Như 12', 30'; Quỳnh 41'; Thảo 78' | Stadium: Jakabaring Stadium; Attendance: 50; Referee: Rebecca Durcau (Australia) |

| July 9 2018 AFF Women's Championship GS | Indonesia | 3–3 | Philippines | Palembang |
| 16:00 | Zahra 54'; Mayang 63'; Syenida 82' | Report | Inquig 9'; Semacio 14'; Quezada 90+5' | Stadium: Jakabaring Stadium; Attendance: 50; Referee: Công Thị Dung (Vietnam) |

| November 4 2020 AFC Olympic Qualifying Tournament | Singapore | 0–9 | Philippines | Hisor |
| 13:00 | | Report | Cadag 3', 5', 43'; Dolino 27'; Long 32', 59'; Navaja 52', 67'; S. Castañeda 57' | Stadium: Hisor Central Stadium; Attendance: 20; Referee: Fusako Kajiyama (Japan) |

| November 8 2020 AFC Olympic Qualifying Tournament | Philippines | 3–1 | Tajikistan | Hisor |
| 16:00 | Cadag 30'; Castañeda 50', 76' (pen.) | Report | G. Khalimova 24' | Stadium: Hisor Central Stadium; Attendance: 70; Referee: Fusako Kajiyama (Japan) |

| November 11 2020 AFC Olympic Qualifying Tournament | Philippines | 5–1 | Mongolia | Hisor |
| 13:00 | Cadag 8', 15', 85'; Rodriguez 60'; Inquig 81' | Report | Ulzibayar 45+2' | Stadium: Hisor Central Stadium |

| November 13 2020 AFC Olympic Qualifying Tournament | Chinese Taipei | 5–0 | Philippines | Hisor |
| 13:00 | Lai Li-chin 41'; Lee Hsiu-chin 44', 65'; Yu Hsiu-chin 57'; Lin Hsin-hui 81' | Report | | Attendance: 30; Referee: Pansa Chaisanit (Thailand) |

=== 2019 ===
| April 1 2020 AFC Olympic Qualifying Tournament | Iran | 0–2 | Philippines | Doha, Qatar |
| 20:00 | | Report | Semacio 47'; del Campo 52' | Stadium: Grand Hamad Stadium; Attendance: 100; Referee: Công Thi Dựng (Vietnam) |

| April 5 2020 AFC Olympic Qualifying Tournament | Philippines | 2–4 | Chinese Taipei | Doha, Qatar |
| 20:00 | Semacio 13'; Tomanon 32' | Report | Michelle Pao 45' (pen.); Tomanon 48' (o.g.); Dolino 63' (o.g.); Ting Chi 87' | Stadium: Grand Hamad Stadium; Attendance: 150; Referee: Edita Mirabidova (Uzbekistan) |

| April 9 2020 AFC Olympic Qualifying Tournament | Philippines | 7–0 | Palestine | Doha, Qatar |
| 20:00 | Semacio 17' (pen.); Del Campo 29'; Madarang 31', 60'; Impelido 62'; Castañeda 66', 70' (pen.) | Report | | Stadium: Grand Hamad Stadium; Attendance: 71; Referee: Asmita Manandhar (Nepal) |

| August 3 Non-FIFA Friendly | Philippines | 11–0 | Macau | Carmona, Philippines |
| | Quezada 6', 31'; Dolino 11'; Rodriguez 34'; Del Campo 44', 48', 49', 89'; Impelido 57'; Long 68' (pen.); Bernal 74' | Report | | Stadium: PFF National Training Centre |

| August 15 2019 AFF Women's Championship GS | Philippines | 3–0 | Malaysia | Chonburi, Thailand |
| 15:00 | Rodriguez 40', 51'; Long 51' | Report | | Stadium: IPE Chonburi Stadium; Attendance: 50; Referee: Thein Thein Aye (Myanmar) |

| August 17 2019 AFF Women's Championship GS | Timor-Leste | 0–7 | Philippines | Chonburi, Thailand |
| 15:00 | | | Quezada 5'; Castañeda 13'; Rodriguez 23', 45+3'; Long 62' (pen.), 76'; Lemoran 90+2' | Stadium: IPE Chonburi Stadium |

| August 21 2019 AFF Women's Championship GS | Philippines | 2–4 | Thailand | Chonburi, Thailand |
| 18:00 | Quezada 11', 66' | | Jaruwan 16'; Rattikan 74'; Silawan 75'; Wilaiporn 90' | Stadium: IPE Chonburi Stadium; Attendance: 100; Referee: Oh Hyeon-jeong (South Korea) |

| August 23 2019 AFF Women's Championship GS | Singapore | 0–4 | Philippines | Chonburi, Thailand |
| 15:00 | | | Del Campo 1', 45', 49'; Quezada 7' | Stadium: IPE Chonburi Stadium; Attendance: 20; Referee: Rita Gani (Malaysia) |

| August 25 2019 AFF Women's Championship SF | Vietnam | 2–1 | Philippines | Chonburi, Thailand |
| 15:00 | Huỳnh Như 41'; Nguyễn Thị Tuyết Dung 57' | | Trần Thị Hồng Nhung 35' (o.g.) | Stadium: IPE Chonburi Stadium; Attendance: 40; Referee: Oh Hyeon-jeong (South Korea) |

| August 27 2019 AFF Women's Championship 3rd place | Myanmar | 3–0 | Philippines | Chonburi, Thailand |
| 15:00 | Yee Yee Oo 63'; Nu Nu 66', 72' | | | Stadium: IPE Chonburi Stadium; Attendance: 60; Referee: Rita Gani (Malaysia) |

| September 15 Friendly | Hong Kong | 1–1 | Philippines | Tseung Kwan O, Hong Kong |
| 20:00 | Cheung Wai Ki 8' | Report | Bernal 89' | Stadium: Tseung Kwan O Sports Ground; Attendance: 505 |

| November 26 2019 Southeast Asian Games GS | Philippines | 0–0 | Myanmar | Biñan, Philippines |
| 20:00 | | | | Stadium: Biñan Football Stadium |

| November 29 2019 Southeast Asian Games GS | Malaysia | 0–5 | Philippines | Biñan, Philippines |
| 16:00 | | Report | Bolden 25', 42', 45+2' del Campo 39'; Madarang 90+3' | Stadium: Biñan Football Stadium; Referee: Asaka Koizumi (Japan) |

| December 5 2019 Southeast Asian Games SF | Vietnam | 2–0 | Philippines | Biñan, Philippines |
| 20:00 | Thái Thị Thảo 60'; Nguyễn Thị Tuyết Dung 84' | | | Stadium: Biñan Football Stadium |

| December 8 2019 Southeast Asian Games 3rd place | Myanmar | 2–1 | Philippines | Manila, Philippines |
| 16:00 | July Kyaw 78'; Yee Yee Oo 80' | Report | Quezada 57' | Stadium: Rizal Memorial Stadium; Referee: Choki Om (Bhutan) |

== See also ==
- Philippines women's national football team results
- Philippines women's national football team results (1981–1999)
- Philippines women's national football team results (2000–2009)
- Philippines women's national football team results (2020–present)
