= Football at the 2013 SEA Games – Women's team squads =

Below are the squads for the Football at the 2013 SEA Games - women's tournament, hosted by Myanmar, which took place between 10 and 20 December 2013.

== Group A ==
=== Myanmar ===
Head coach: (Japan) Yoshinori Kumada

No.	Pos.	Player	Date of birth (age)	Club
1	GK	May Khin Ya Min	11 January 1986 (aged 27)	
2	DF	Myint Myint Aye	27 December 1988 (aged 24)	
3	DF	Shwe Sin Aung	9 April 1990 (aged 23)	
4	DF	Moe Moe War	21 September 1984 (aged 29)	
5	DF	Phu Pwint Khine	23 July 1987 (aged 26)	
6	DF	San San Maw (captain)	5 October 1980 (aged 33)	
7	MF	Than Than Htwe	24 July 1986 (aged 27)	
8	MF	Nilar Myint	1 July 1989 (aged 24)	
9	FW	Yee Yee Oo	1 August 1990 (aged 23)	
10	FW	Khin Marlar Tun	21 May 1988 (aged 25)	
11	FW	Khin Moe Wai	16 December 1989 (aged 23)	
12	FW	Naw Ar Lo Wer Phaw	11 January 1988 (aged 25)	
13	FW	Margret Marri	16 October 1986 (aged 27)	
14	DF	Wai Wai Aung	5 October 1993 (aged 20)	
15	MF	Zin Mar Win	2 January 1990 (aged 23)	
16	DF	Khin Than Wai	2 November 1995 (aged 18)	
17	MF	Thida Oo	25 June 1984 (aged 29)	
18	FW	Win Theingi Tun	1 February 1995 (aged 18)	
19	FW	Zar Chi Oo	6 May 1988 (aged 25)	
20	GK	Mya Phu Ngon	10 August 1989 (aged 24)	

=== Philippines ===
Head coach: Ernest Nierras

No.	Pos.	Player	Date of birth (age)	Club
1	GK	Maria dela Cruz	November 13, 1993 (aged 20)	(United States Soccer Federation) Idaho State Bengals
2	DF	Cat Barnekow	September 24, 1990 (aged 23)	
3	DF	Sarah Cook	September 26, 1993 (aged 20)	(United States Soccer Federation) Cal State Bakersfield Roadrunners
6	DF	Morgan Brown	October 20, 1995 (aged 18)	(United States Soccer Federation) Santa Clara Broncos
7	MF	Samantha Nierras	July 16, 1989 (aged 24)	Unattached
8	MF	Marisa Park	August 25, 1991 (aged 22)	Unattached
9	FW	Jesse Shugg	May 2, 1992 (aged 21)	(United States Soccer Federation) Miami Hurricanes
12	MF	Monika Lee	March 28, 1994 (aged 19)	(United States Soccer Federation) Loyola Ramblers
13	MF	Rachel Nichols	August 13, 1992 (aged 21)	(United States Soccer Federation) Cornell Big Red
14	MF	Raylene Larot	May 4, 1991 (aged 22)	(United States Soccer Federation) Sacramento State Hornets
16	MF	Megan Jurado	February 25, 1991 (aged 22)	Unattached
17	MF	Natasha Alquiros	January 17, 1991 (aged 22)	Unattached
19	DF	Katherine Lim	May 24, 1993 (aged 20)	(United States Soccer Federation) Boston College Eagles
20	FW	Christina delos Reyes	February 28, 1994 (aged 19)	(Philippine Football Federation) UP Lady Maroons
22	GK	Patricia Dull	October 17, 1997 (aged 16)	(United States Soccer Federation) Temple City High School
23	FW	Joana Houplin	February 12, 1990 (aged 23)	
24	DF	Patrice Impelido	October 9, 1987 (aged 26)	
25	MF	Chalise Baysa		
26	MF	Aisa Mondero	October 26, 1989 (aged 24)	
32	DF	Alexa Diaz		(United States Soccer Federation) Seattle Pacific Falcons

=== Vietnam ===
Head coach: (China) Chen Yunfa

No.	Pos.	Player	Date of birth (age)	Club
1	GK	Đặng Thị Kiều Trinh	19 December 1985 (aged 27)	(Vietnam Football Federation) TP.HCM
2	DF	Nguyễn Thị Xuyến	6 September 1987 (aged 26)	(Vietnam Football Federation) Hà Nội
3	DF	Chương Thị Kiều	19 August 1995 (aged 18)	(Vietnam Football Federation) TP.HCM
4	DF	Nguyễn Thị Nga	9 May 1985 (aged 28)	
5	DF	Bùi Thị Như	10 June 1990 (aged 23)	(Vietnam Football Federation) Phong Phú Hà Nam
6	MF	Phạm Hoàng Quỳnh	20 September 1992 (aged 21)	
7	MF	Nguyễn Thị Tuyết Dung	13 December 1993 (aged 19)	(Vietnam Football Federation) Phong Phú Hà Nam
8	FW	Nguyễn Thị Minh Nguyệt	16 November 1986 (aged 27)	(Vietnam Football Federation) Phong Phú Hà Nam
9	FW	Huỳnh Như	28 November 1991 (aged 22)	
10	FW	Nguyễn Thị Hòa	27 July 1990 (aged 23)	(Vietnam Football Federation) Hà Nội
11	FW	Nguyễn Thị Nguyệt	5 November 1992 (aged 21)	(Vietnam Football Federation) Than khoáng sản VN
12	DF	Vũ Thị Nhung	9 July 1992 (aged 21)	(Vietnam Football Federation) Hà Nội
13	MF	Nguyễn Thị Muôn	7 October 1988 (aged 25)	(Vietnam Football Federation) Hà Nội
14	GK	Lê Thị Tuyết Mai	15 February 1985 (aged 28)	(Vietnam Football Federation) TP.HCM
15	DF	Nguyễn Thị Ngọc Anh	23 February 1985 (aged 28)	(Vietnam Football Federation) Hà Nội
16	MF	Lê Thị Thương	23 December 1984 (aged 28)	(Vietnam Football Federation) Than khoáng sản VN
17	DF	Nguyễn Hải Hòa	22 December 1989 (aged 23)	(Vietnam Football Federation) GT Thái Nguyên
18	MF	Nguyễn Thị Liễu	18 September 1992 (aged 21)	(Vietnam Football Federation) Phong Phú Hà Nam
22	FW	Lê Thu Thanh Hương	21 September 1991 (aged 22)	(Vietnam Football Federation) Phong Phú Hà Nam
23	MF	Trần Thị Kim Hồng	26 January 1985 (aged 28)	(Vietnam Football Federation) TP.HCM

== Group B ==
=== Laos ===
Head coach: (Japan) Honma Kei

No.	Pos.	Player	Date of birth (age)	Club
1	GK	Boonyong Akkhavong	10 October 1991 (aged 22)	
2		Soutdaoloung Phasiri	14 July 1988 (aged 25)	
5		Sengthid Khamla	28 June 1993 (aged 20)	
7		Noum Anmahongsa	13 January 1993 (aged 20)	
8		Souchitta Phonhalath (c)	19 May 1992 (aged 21)	
9		Nok Douangmala	15 March 1991 (aged 22)	
10		Sysuvan Phomsuvan	14 February 1994 (aged 19)	
11		Phanykone Vannalath	6 November 1995 (aged 18)	
12		Anouluck Keosinthavone	25 December 1990 (aged 22)	
13		Bouasy Chanphong	12 February 1990 (aged 23)	
14		Phetphachan Phommachack	14 January 1991 (aged 22)	
15		Vannida Soukpanhya	10 August 1991 (aged 22)	
16		Minivanh Bounthan	11 June 1990 (aged 23)	
17		B. Louangamard	20 May 1995 (aged 18)	
18		Viengkhone Chantamala	1 July 1990 (aged 23)	
19		Keota Phongoudom	19 January 1991 (aged 22)	
22	GK	Hongthong Choulapanh	5 September 1986 (aged 27)	
29		Vongdeuan Chanthanivong	20 September 1984 (aged 29)	

=== Malaysia ===
Head coach: Jacob Joseph

No.	Pos.	Player	Date of birth (age)	Club
1	GK	Nur Izwani Azman	13 October 1987 (aged 26)	
2		Shasha Md Hairol Nizam	9 March 1988 (aged 25)	
4		Shereilynn Elly Pius	20 August 1991 (aged 22)	
5		Norsuriani Mazli	27 April 1990 (aged 23)	
6		Jaciah Jumilis	23 July 1991 (aged 22)	
7		Syaidatul Edora Samsudin	18 November 1990 (aged 23)	
8		Eslilah Esar	18 July 1989 (aged 24)	
9		Lilis Masturah Majid	5 February 1990 (aged 23)	
10		Haindee Mosroh	17 April 1993 (aged 20)	
11		Angela Anak Kais (c)	7 September 1980 (aged 33)	
12		Marcella Ramli	8 January 1990 (aged 23)	
14		Norhanisa Yahya	2 April 1989 (aged 24)	
15		Pedrolia Martin Sikayun	18 February 1992 (aged 21)	
16		Zaryatie Zakaria	4 June 1981 (aged 32)	
17		Malini Nordin	29 December 1985 (aged 27)	
18		Sihaya Ajad	10 March 1990 (aged 23)	
19		Dadree Rofinus	7 January 1990 (aged 23)	
21		Roszaini Bakar	17 October 1990 (aged 23)	
22		Heni Hartati	18 November 1992 (aged 21)	
25		Lovelytha Jelus	25 August 1991 (aged 22)	

=== Thailand ===
Head coach: Jatuporn Pramualban

No.	Pos.	Player	Date of birth (age)	Club
1	GK	Waraporn Boonsing	16 February 1990 (aged 23)	(Football Association of Thailand) BG-Bandit Asia
2	DF	Darut Changplook	3 February 1988 (aged 25)	(Football Association of Thailand) North Bangkok College
3	DF	Natthakarn Chinwong	15 March 1992 (aged 21)	(Football Association of Thailand) Khonkaen Sport School
4	DF	Duangnapa Sritala	4 February 1986 (aged 27)	(Football Association of Thailand) Bangkok-Thonburi
5	DF	Kwanruethai Kunupatham	19 October 1990 (aged 23)	(Football Association of Thailand) BG-Bandit Asia
6	MF	Pikul Khueanpet	20 September 1988 (aged 25)	
8	MF	Naphat Seesraum (C)	11 May 1987 (aged 26)	(Japan Football Association) Speranza F.C. Osaka-Takatsuki
9	DF	Warunee Phetwiset	13 December 1990 (aged 22)	(Football Association of Thailand) Chonburi Sriprathum
10	DF	Sunisa Srangthaisong	6 May 1988 (aged 25)	(Football Association of Thailand) BG-Bandit Asia
11	MF	Ainon Phancha	26 January 1992 (aged 21)	(Football Association of Thailand)
16	DF	Khwanrudi Saengchan	19 May 1991 (aged 22)	(Football Association of Thailand) BG-Bandit Asia
17	DF	Anootsara Maijarern	14 February 1986 (aged 27)	(Football Association of Thailand) Royal Thai Air Force
19	FW	Taneekarn Dangda	15 December 1992 (aged 20)	(Football Association of Thailand) Bangkok-Thonburi
20	MF	Wilaiporn Boothduang	25 June 1987 (aged 26)	(Football Association of Thailand) Bangkok-Thonburi
21	FW	Kanjana Sungngoen	21 September 1986 (aged 27)	(Japan Football Association) Speranza F.C. Osaka-Takatsuki
22	GK	Sukanya Chor Charoenying	24 November 1987 (aged 26)	(Football Association of Thailand) Royal Thai Air Force
23	FW	Nisa Romyen	18 January 1990 (aged 23)	(Football Association of Thailand) North Bangkok College
24	FW	Rattikan Thongsombut	7 July 1991 (aged 22)	(Football Association of Thailand) BG-Bandit Asia
27	MF	Alisa Rukpinij	2 February 1995 (aged 18)	
28	MF	Supaporn Gaewbaen	4 March 1985 (aged 28)	(Football Association of Thailand) BG-Bandit Asia
