= Indonesia women's national football team results (2010–2019) =

Indonesia women's national football team results

This article provides details of international football games played by the Indonesia women's national football team from 2010 to 2019.

== Results ==
Key
Win
Draw
Defeat

=== 2010 ===
16 February 2010 Friendly	Indonesia	0–2	Bahrain	Palembang, Indonesia
				Stadium: Gelora Sriwijaya Stadium

=== 2011 ===
16 October 2011 AFF Women's Championship	Indonesia	0–11	Laos	Vientiane, Laos
19:00 UTC+7		Report	Sengmany 30'; Phayvanh 15', 22', 37'; Phonhalath 53', 62' (pen.), 90' (pen.); Phasiri 64'; Bounthan 65'; Bouakeo 78'; Sayasanh 84'	Stadium: New Laos National Stadium

18 October 2011 AFF Women's Championship	Singapore	1–3	Indonesia	Vientiane, Laos
16:00 UTC+7	Afiqah 84'	Report	Henny 60'; Hamizah 72' (o.g.); Akudiana 90+'	Stadium: New Laos National Stadium

20 October 2011 AFF Women's Championship	Indonesia	0–14	Vietnam	Vientiane, Laos
19:00 UTC+7		Report	Nguyễn Thị Liễu 5'; Phạm Hải Yến (?); Lê Thu Thanh Hương (?); Lê Thị Thủy (?); Nguyễn Thị Muôn (?)	Stadium: Laos National Stadium

=== 2013 ===
10 September 2013 AFF Women's Championship	Indonesia	0–6	Philippines	Yangon, Myanmar
19:30 UTC+6:30		Report	Houplin 7', 47', 73'; Wilson 51'; Cooke 79'; Park 85'	Stadium: Thuwunna Stadium; Referee: Rita Ghani (Malaysia)

12 September 2013 AFF Women's Championship	Indonesia	1–2	Laos	Yangon, Myanmar
19:30 UTC+6:30	Tugiyati 45+2'	Report	Souchitta 54', 77'	Stadium: Thuwunna Stadium; Referee: Mai Hoang Trang (Vietnam)

14 September 2013 AFF Women's Championship	Japan U23	8–0	Indonesia	Yangon, Myanmar
15:30 UTC+6:30	Ozeki 18'; Takahashi 26', 38'; Mitsuhashi 45', 46', 68'; Komatsu 53'; Horiuchi 88'	Report		Stadium: Thuwunna Stadium

16 September 2013 AFF Women's Championship	Indonesia	0–4	Myanmar	Yangon, Myanmar
15:30 UTC+6:30		Report	Khin Than Wai 16'; San San Maw 20'; Margret Marri 23'; Yee Yee Oo 71'	Stadium: Thuwunna Stadium

=== 2015 ===
1 May 2015 AFF Women's Championship	Indonesia	0–2	Laos	Ho Chi Minh City, Vietnam
18:30 UTC+7		Report	Vannida 10'; Noum 47' (pen.)	Stadium: Thống Nhất Stadium; Attendance: 10; Referee: Patchaya Boonprasit (Thailand)

3 May 2015 AFF Women's Championship	Indonesia	1–10	Thailand	Ho Chi Minh City, Vietnam
18:30 UTC+7	Erma 82'	Report	Nisa 5', 39', 45'; Anootsara 30', 37'; Pikul 53'; Wilaiporn 59'; Alisa 66'; Naphat 75'; Orathai 87'	Stadium: Thống Nhất Stadium; Attendance: 10; Referee: Thein Thein Aye (Myanmar)

5 May 2015 AFF Women's Championship	Australia U20	7–0	Indonesia	Ho Chi Minh City, Vietnam
18:30 UTC+7	Ibini 26'; Baker 9', 29'; Condon 32', 60'; Chidiac 42'; Price 56'	Report		Stadium: Thống Nhất Stadium; Attendance: 80; Referee: Mai Hoàng Trang (Vietnam)

=== 2018 ===
27 May 2018 Friendly	Indonesia	0–13	Thailand	Palembang, Indonesia
19:00 UTC+7		Report	Taneekarn 4', 28', 40'; Khwanrudi 5', 10'; Silawan 27', 45'; Ainon 30'; Wilaiporn 34'; Saowalak 56', 73', 80'; Sudarat 87'	Stadium: Gelora Sriwijaya Stadium

31 May 2018 Friendly	Indonesia	0–3	Thailand	Palembang, Indonesia
14:30 UTC+7		Report	Alisa 45'; Silawan 83'; Kanyanat 87'	Stadium: Bumi Sriwijaya Stadium

3 July 2018 AFF Women's Championship	Singapore	0–0	Indonesia	Palembang, Indonesia
16:00 UTC+7		Report		Stadium: Gelora Sriwijaya Stadium; Attendance: 200; Referee: Pansa Chaisanit (Thailand)

3 July 2018 AFF Women's Championship	Indonesia	0–2	Vietnam	Palembang, Indonesia
19:00 UTC+7		Report	Huỳnh Như 2', 52'; Nguyễn Thị Vạn 28'; Phạm Hải Yến 41'; Thái Thị Thảo 48'; Nguyễn Thị Tuyết Dung 63'	Stadium: Gelora Sriwijaya Stadium; Attendance: 100; Referee: Thein Thein Aye (Myanmar)

5 July 2018 AFF Women's Championship	Myanmar	6–1	Indonesia	Palembang, Indonesia
19:00 UTC+7	Win Theingi Tun 4', 12', 56', 65'; Thandar Moe 24'; July Kyaw 84'	Report	Yudith 66'	Stadium: Gelora Sriwijaya Stadium; Attendance: 200; Referee: Pansa Chaisanit (Thailand)

9 July 2018 AFF Women's Championship	Indonesia	3–3	Philippines	Palembang, Indonesia
19:00 UTC+7	Zahra 54'; Mayang 63'; Syenida 82'	Report	Inquig 9'; Semacio 14'; Quezada 90+5'	Stadium: Gelora Sriwijaya Stadium; Attendance: 50; Referee: Công Thị Dung (Vietnam)

16 August 2018 2018 Asian Games	Indonesia	6–0	Maldives	Palembang, Indonesia
18:30 UTC+7	Zahra 10', 72'; Mayang 15' (pen.), 55'; Yudith 30'; Jesella 61'	Report		Stadium: Gelora Sriwijaya Stadium; Referee: Thein Thein Aye (Myanmar)

19 August 2018 2018 Asian Games	Chinese Taipei	4–0	Indonesia	Palembang, Indonesia
18:30 UTC+7	Yu Hsiu-chin 5'; Chan Pi-han 16'; Lin Ya-han 33'; Michelle Pao 39'	Report		Stadium: Gelora Sriwijaya Stadium; Referee: Asaka Matsushita (Japan)

21 August 2018 2018 Asian Games	Indonesia	0–12	South Korea	Palembang, Indonesia
18:30 UTC+7		Report	Lee Hyun-young 4' (pen.), 38', 47', 71', 90'; Moon Mi-ra 11', 37'; Lim Seon-joo 14'; Son Hwa-yeon 48'; Jang Sel-gi 67'; Ji So-yun 88', 90+2'	Stadium: Gelora Sriwijaya Stadium; Referee: Mahsa Ghorbani (Iran)

8 November 2018 2020 AFC Women's Olympic Qualifying Tournament	Indonesia	1–1	Palestine	Al-Ram, Palestine
17:30 UTC+2	Riski 64'	Report	Sohgian 90+5'	Stadium: Faisal Al-Husseini International Stadium; Attendance: 100; Referee: Law Bik Chi (Hong Kong)

11 November 2018 2020 AFC Women's Olympic Qualifying Tournament	Maldives	1–3	Indonesia	Al-Ram, Palestine
14:30 UTC+2	Fadhuwa 73'	Report	Sari 22'; Oktafiani 49', 69'	Stadium: Faisal Al-Husseini International Stadium; Attendance: 100; Referee: Cha Min-ji (South Korea)

13 November 2018 2020 AFC Women's Olympic Qualifying Tournament	Jordan	3–0	Indonesia	Al-Ram, Palestine
14:30 UTC+2	Jebreen 16'; Al-Nahar 74'; Abu Ghosh 87'	Report		Stadium: Faisal Al-Husseini International Stadium; Attendance: 110; Referee: Thein Thein Aye (Myanmar)

23 November 2018 FAS Women's International Quadrangular	Indonesia	0–1	Luxembourg	Kallang, Singapore
		Report	Amy 52'	Stadium: Jalan Besar Stadium

25 November 2018 FAS Women's International Quadrangular	Indonesia	0–0 (1–3 p)	Maldives	Kallang, Singapore
		Report		Stadium: Jalan Besar Stadium

=== 2019 ===
3 April 2019 2020 AFC Women's Olympic Qualifying Tournament	Indonesia	0–2	India	Mandalay, Myanmar
15:00 UTC+6:30		Report	Grace 27', 68'	Stadium: Mandalarthiri Stadium; Attendance: 100; Referee: Kim Yu-jeong (South Korea)

6 April 2019 2020 AFC Women's Olympic Qualifying Tournament	Indonesia	0–6	Myanmar	Mandalay, Myanmar
18:00 UTC+6:30		Report	Khin Marlar Tun 2', 49'; Yee Yee Oo 19', 65', 74'; Win Theingi Tun 32'	Stadium: Mandalarthiri Stadium; Attendance: 755; Referee: Cha Min-ji (South Korea)

9 April 2019 2020 AFC Women's Olympic Qualifying Tournament	Indonesia	1–2	Nepal	Mandalay, Myanmar
15:30 UTC+6:30	Amiatun 47'	Report	Bhandari 36', 89'	Stadium: Bahtoo Stadium; Attendance: 100; Referee: Cha Min-ji (South Korea)

16 August 2019 AFF Women's Championship	Myanmar	7–0	Indonesia	Chonburi, Thailand
15:00 UTC+7	Yee Yee Oo 3', 27', 90'; Khaing Thazin 17'; Khin Moe Wai 45+4'; Win Theingi Tun 66'; Khin Marlar Tun 76'	Report		Stadium: IPE Chonburi Stadium 1 Attendance: 45; Referee: Rita Gani (Malaysia)

18 August 2019 AFF Women's Championship	Indonesia	0–7	Vietnam	Chonburi, Thailand
15:00 UTC+7		Report	Nguyễn Thị Bích Thùy 1'; Huỳnh Như 19', 40', 43'; Phạm Hải Yến 22'; Nguyễn Thị Tuyết Dung 61', 63'	Stadium: IPE Chonburi Stadium 1 Attendance: 20; Referee: Rita Gani (Malaysia)

20 August 2019 AFF Women's Championship	Cambodia	0–4	Indonesia	Chonburi, Thailand
18:00 UTC+7		Report	Mayang 21'; Dewi 25', 90+1'; Amiatun 90+4'	Stadium: IPE Chonburi Stadium 1 Attendance: 20; Referee: Pansa Chaisanit (Thailand)

29 November 2019 Southeast Asian Games	Indonesia	0–6	Vietnam	Biñan, Philippines
16:00 UTC+8		Report	Nguyễn Thị Tuyết Dung 9', 84'; Nguyễn Thị Vạn 14', 19'; Huỳnh Như 50', 60'	Stadium: Biñan Football Stadium; Attendance: 101; Referee: Cha Min-ji (South Korea)

2 December 2019 Southeast Asian Games	Thailand	5–1	Indonesia	Manila, Philippines
16:00 UTC+8	Kanyanat 2', 18', 29'; Silawan 42'; Suchawadee 51'	Report	Rani 70'	Stadium: Rizal Memorial Stadium; Attendance: 250; Referee: Albakkar Doumouh Ibrahim (Lebanon)
