= Laos women's national football team results =

This article lists the All-time results and fixtures for the Laos women's national football team.

The team's first international appearance was at the 2007 AFF Women's Championship, where they played their inaugural match against Thailand on 6 September 2007, suffering a 13–1 defeat. During the same tournament, the team secured its first victory, defeating Singapore 3–1 on the final matchday. The team's largest win to date is an 11–0 victory against Indonesia at the 2011 AFF Women's Championship hosted in Laos. A year later, the team recorded its worst result, enduring a 1–14 loss to Thailand.

== Record per opponent ==
Key

Positive balance (more wins than losses)
Neutral balance (as many wins as losses)
Negative balance (more losses than wins)

The following table shows Laos' all-time official international record per opponent:

Opponent	Pld	W	D	L	GF	GA	GD	W%	Confed.
Bahrain	1	0	1	0	0	0	0	0	AFC
Bhutan	1	0	1	0	0	0	0	0	AFC
Cambodia	3	1	1	1	2	3	−1	33.33	AFC
Chinese Taipei	2	0	0	2	0	8	−8	0	AFC
Indonesia	5	4	0	1	16	6	+10	80	AFC
Iran	1	0	0	1	1	5	−4	0	AFC
Jordan	2	1	0	1	4	8	−4	50	AFC
Lebanon	1	0	0	1	1	4	−3	0	AFC
Malaysia	9	5	1	3	21	12	+9	55.55	AFC
Myanmar	7	0	1	6	2	31	−29	0	AFC
Nepal	1	0	0	1	0	9	−9	0	AFC
Pakistan	1	0	1	0	1	1	0	0	AFC
Philippines	2	0	1	1	4	9	−5	0	AFC
Saudi Arabia	3	0	0	3	1	13	−12	0	AFC
Singapore	6	2	1	3	10	6	+4	33.33	AFC
Sri Lanka	1	1	0	0	2	0	+2	100	AFC
Thailand	11	0	0	11	3	79	−76	0	AFC
Timor-Leste	2	1	1	0	2	0	+2	50	AFC
Vietnam	10	0	0	10	1	61	−60	0	AFC
Uzbekistan	1	0	0	1	0	7	−7	0	AFC
Total	70	15	9	46	71	262	−191	21.42	—

Last updated: Laos vs Indonesia, 22 July 2026.

The following table shows the Laos Senior team's all-time official record against other age-group teams by opponent:

Opponent	Pld	W	D	L	GF	GA	GD	W%	Confederation
Australia U20	1	0	0	1	0	1	−1	0	AFC
Japan U23	1	0	0	1	1	4	−3	0	AFC
Total	2	0	0	2	1	5	−4	0	—

== Results by Year ==
Sources: Global Sport Archive. Worldfootball.net. Flashscore. The Roon Ba.

=== 2007 ===
6 September 2007 2007 AFF Championship GS	Thailand	13–1	Laos	Yangon, Myanmar
17:45 UTC+6:30		Report	Souphavanh 70'	Stadium: Thuwunna Stadium

8 September 2007 2007 AFF Championship GS	Myanmar	7–0	Laos	Yangon, Myanmar
17:45 06:30				Stadium: Thuwunna Stadium

10 September 2007 2007 AFF Championship GS	Laos	3–1	Singapore	Yangon, Myanmar
15:30 06:30				Stadium: Aung San Stadium

1 November 2007 Friendly	Vietnam	10–0	Laos	Cẩm Phả, Vietnam
14:30 UTC+7				Stadium: Cẩm Phả Stadium

3 December 2007 2007 SEA Games GS	Laos	2–2	Philippines	Nakhon Ratchasima, Thailand
15:15 UTC+7	Souphavanh 39'; Sengmany 61'	Report	P. Impelido 48'; Agravante 50'	Stadium: Municipality of Tumbon Mueangpug Stadium; Referee: Rita Gani (Malaysia)

8 December 2007 2007 SEA Games GS	Vietnam	4–1	Laos	Nakhon Ratchasima, Thailand
15:15 UTC+7	Bùi Thị Tuyết Mai 2'; Sangvan Inthasvong 45' (o.g.); Vũ Thị Huyền Linh 62'; Nguyễn Thị Minh Nguyệt 72'		Johnny Sayasanh 64'	Stadium: Municipality of Tumbon Mueangpug Stadium; Referee: Praew Semaksuk (Thailand)

10 December 2007 2007 SEA Games SF	Thailand	8–0	Laos	Nakhon Ratchasima, Thailand
14:30 UTC+7	Nisa 10', 59'; Junpen 36', 75'; Anootsara 50'; Supaporn 61'; Pitsamai 69'; Kitiya 87'			Stadium: Municipality of Tumbon Mueangpug Stadium; Referee: Daw San San Myint (Myanmar)

13 December 2007 2007 SEA Games 3rd place	Laos	0–5	Myanmar	Nakhon Ratchasima, Thailand
13:30 UTC+7			Khuanta Sehhonivong 12' (o.g.); Aye Nandar Hlaing 34', 69'; Margrat Marri 39'; San Yu Naing 90+1'	Stadium: Municipality of Tumbon Mueangpug Stadium; Referee: Rita Gani (Malaysia)

=== 2008 ===
8 October 2008 2008 AFF Championship GS	Indonesia	0–1	Laos	Ho Chi Minh City, Vietnam
17:45 UTC+7			Sochitta Phonhalath 87' (pen.)	Stadium: Thành Long Sports Centre

12 October 2008 2008 AFF Championship GS	Myanmar	7–0	Laos	Ho Chi Minh City, Vietnam
15:30 UTC+7	Yee Yee Oo 43', 45'; Naw Ar Lo Wer Phaw 64', 67'; My Nilar Htwe 72', 83'; Than Than Htwe 89'			Stadium: Thành Long Sports Centre

14 October 2008 2008 AFF Championship GS	Laos	3–1	Malaysia	Ho Chi Minh City, Vietnam
15:30 UTC+7	Phayvanh 17', 90'; Phonhalath 74'		Atin 82'	Stadium: Thành Long Sports Centre

16 October 2008 2008 AFF Championship GS	Laos	0–6	Vietnam	Ho Chi Minh City, Vietnam
18:00 UTC+7			Lê Thị Oanh 17', 20', 50'; Đỗ Thị Ngọc Châm 30'; Lê Thị Thương 40'; Trần Thị Kim Hồng 70'	Stadium: Thành Long Sports Centre

=== 2009 ===
9 September 2009 Friendly	Laos	5–0	Malaysia	Vientiane, Laos
--:-- UTC+7

17 October 2009 Friendly	Vietnam	5–0	Laos	Cẩm Phả, Vietnam
--:-- UTC+7	Nguyễn Thị Muôn 10'; Đoàn Thị Kim Chi 18'; Văn Thị Thanh 48'; Đỗ Thị Ngọc Châm 70', 75'			Stadium: Cẩm Phả Stadium

20 October 2009 Friendly	Laos	0–5	Thailand	Cẩm Phả, Vietnam
--:-- UTC+7				Stadium: Cẩm Phả Stadium

4 December 2009 2009 SEA Games GS	Laos	1–1	Myanmar	Vientiane, Laos
15:45 UTC+7	Souphavanh Phayvanh 33'	Report	My Nilar Htwe 35'	Stadium: National University of Laos Stadium

8 December 2009 2009 SEA Games GS	Thailand	4–1	Laos	Vientiane, Laos
15:45 UTC+7	Pitsamai 6'; Orathai 28'; Naphat 32'; Sukunya 89'	Report	Phayvanh 13'	Stadium: National University of Laos Stadium

11 December 2009 2009 SEA Games GS	Laos	5–0	Malaysia	Vientiane, Laos
13:30 UTC+7	Phayvanh 47', 74'; Phonhalath 60', 68'; Sihanouvong 83'	Report		Stadium: National University of Laos Stadium

13 December 2009 2009 SEA Games GS	Vietnam	3–0	Laos	Vientiane, Laos
15:45 UTC+7	Trần Thị Kim Hồng 14', 73'; Đoàn Thị Kim Chi 82'	Report		Stadium: Chao Anouvong Stadium

=== 2011 ===
16 October 2011 2011 AFF Championship GS	Indonesia	0–11	Laos	Vientiane, Laos
19:00 UTC+7		Report	Sengmany 3'; Phayvanh 15', 22', 37'; Phonhalath 53', 62' (pen.), 90' (pen.); Phasiri 64'; Bounthan 65'; Bouakeo 78'; Sayasanh 84'	Stadium: New Laos National Stadium

18 October 2011 2011 AFF Championship GS	Laos	0–4	Vietnam	Vientiane, Laos
19:00 UTC+7			Huỳnh Như 1'; Nguyễn Thị Hòa 8', 29', 33'	Stadium: New Laos National Stadium

20 October 2011 2011 AFF Championship GS	Laos	5–0	Singapore	Vientiane, Laos
19:00 UTC+7	Phonhalath 5'; Phayvanh 33', 53', 60', 88'	Report		Stadium: New Laos National Stadium

23 October 2011 2011 AFF Championship SF	Laos	0–4	Thailand	Vientiane, Laos
19:00 UTC+7	Anootsara 53', 63', 72'; Nisa 56'	Report		Stadium: New Laos National Stadium; Referee: Thein Thein Aye (Myanmar)

25 October 2011 2011 AFF Championship 3rd place	Vietnam	6–0	Laos	Vientiane, Laos
16:00 UTC+7	Lê Thị Thương 1'; Huỳnh Như 3'; Nguyễn Thị Hòa 40', 71'; Chương Thị Kiều 57' (pen.); Lê Thu Thanh Hương 70'	Report		Stadium: New Laos National Stadium; Referee: Boonpasit Patchaya (Thailand)

=== 2012 ===
16 September 2012 2012 AFF Championship GS	Malaysia	2–3	Laos	Ho Chi Minh City, Vietnam
16:00 UTC+7	Masturah 41'; Zaryatie 79'	Report	Keota 6'; Souphavanh 19'; Suchitta 80' (pen.)	Stadium: Thong Nhat Stadium; Referee: Công Thị Dung (Vietnam)

18 September 2012 2012 AFF Championship GS	Thailand	3–0	Laos	Ho Chi Minh City, Vietnam
16:00 UTC+7	Anootsara 6'; Taneekarn 35'; Junpen 82'	Report		Stadium: Thong Nhat Stadium; Referee: Kate Jacewicz (Australia)

20 September 2012 2012 AFF Championship SF	Vietnam	7–0	Laos	Ho Chi Minh City, Vietnam
16:00 UTC+7		Report	Nguyễn Thị Minh Nguyệt 5', 66'; Nguyễn Thị Muôn 15', 18'; Nguyễn Thị Hòa 68', 72'; Lê Thu Thanh Hương 77'	Stadium: Thong Nhat Stadium; Referee: Kate Jacewicz (Australia)

22 September 2012 2012 AFF Championship 3rd place	Laos	1–14	Thailand	Ho Chi Minh City, Vietnam
16:00 UTC+7	Souphavanh 44'	Report	Junpen 2', 8', 66', 81'; Rattikan 13', 20'; Chidtawan 36'; Kanjana 63', 64', 90'; Anootsara 79'; Duangnapa 70'; Taneekarn 83', 85'	Stadium: Thong Nhat Stadium; Referee: Mai Hoàng Trang (Vietnam)

=== 2013 ===
3 September 2013 Friendly	Laos	0–5	Jordan	Vientiane, Laos
--:-- UTC+7				Stadium: Laos National Stadium

5 September 2013 Friendly	Laos	4–3	Jordan	Vientiane, Laos
16:00 UTC+7				Stadium: Laos National Stadium

10 September 2013 2013 AFF Championship GS	Laos	0–5	Myanmar	Yangon, Myanmar
15:30 UTC+6:30		Report	San San Maw 32'; Khin Marlar Tun 53'; Yee Yee Oo 77'; Khin Moe Wai 79', 82'	Stadium: Thuwunna Stadium; Referee: Mai Hoàng Trang (Vietnam)

12 September 2013 2013 AFF Championship GS	Indonesia	1–2	Laos	Yangon, Myanmar
19:30 UTC+6:30	Tugiyati 45+2'	Report	Souchitta 54', 77'	Stadium: Thuwunna Stadium; Referee: Mai Hoàng Trang (Vietnam)

16 September 2013 2013 AFF Championship GS	Laos	1–4	Japan U23	Yangon, Myanmar
19:30 UTC+6:30	Souphavanh 22'	Report	Hashiura 66'; Takahashi 69', 84'; Imai 90+1'	Stadium: Thuwunna Stadium

18 September 2013 2013 AFF Championship GS	Philippines	7–2	Laos	Yangon, Myanmar
16:00 UTC+6:30	Houplin 1', 3', 7', 31'; Alquiros 59'; Baysa 69'; Soriano 80'	Report	Souchitta 76' (pen.); Phonethip 90' (pen.)	Stadium: Aung San Stadium

23 October 2013 Friendly	Malaysia	1–2	Laos	Shah Alam, Malaysia
20:45 UTC+8			Vannida; Phanykone	Stadium: UiTM Stadium

25 October 2013 Friendly	Malaysia	1–0	Laos	Shah Alam, Malaysia
20:45 UTC+8	Rofinus 75'	Report		Stadium: UiTM Stadium

9 December 2013 Friendly	Vietnam	11–0	Laos	Mandalay, Myanmar
--:-- UTC+8

12 December 2013 2013 SEA Games GS	Laos	1–3	Malaysia	Mandalay, Myanmar
16:00 UTC+6:30	Noum 74'	Report	Angela 2', 9'; Sihaya 68'	Stadium: Mandalarthiri Stadium; Referee: Mai Hoàng Trang (Vietnam)

16 December 2013 2013 SEA Games GS	Thailand	5–0	Laos	Mandalay, Myanmar
16:00 UTC+6:30	Anootsara 12', 44', 61'; Ainon 26'; Taneekarn 81'	Report		Stadium: Mandalarthiri Stadium; Referee: Seinn Cho Aung (Myanmar)

=== 2015 ===
20 March 2015 2016 Olympic Qualifying Tournament	Laos	0–4	Chinese Taipei	Taipei, Taiwan
19:00 UTC+8		Report	Yu Hsiu-chin 11'; Lai Li-chin 43'; Lin Ya-han 81'; Lee Hsiu-chin 90+3'	Stadium: Taipei Municipal Stadium; Attendance: 1,200; Referee: Anna Sidorova (Uzbekistan)

22 March 2015 2016 Olympic Qualifying Tournament	Iran	5–1	Laos	Tapei, Taiwan
19:00	Behesht 30', 62'; Karimi 35'; Norouzi 77'; Arjangi 88' (pen.)	Report	Phayvanh 33'	Stadium: Taipei Municipal Stadium; Attendance: 150; Referee: Wang Jia (China)

1 May 2015 2015 AFF Championship GS	Indonesia	0–2	Laos	Ho Chi Minh City, Vietnam
18:30 UTC+7		Report	Vannida 10'; Noum 47' (pen.)	Stadium: Thống Nhất Stadium; Attendance: 10; Referee: Patchaya Boonprasit (Thailand)

3 May 2015 2015 AFF Championship GS	Australia U20	1–0	Laos	Ho Chi Minh City, Vietnam
16:00 UTC+7	Ferguson 59'	Report		Stadium: Thống Nhất Stadium; Attendance: 10; Referee: Seinn Cho Aung (Myanmar)

5 May 2015 2015 AFF Championship GS	Laos	0–12	Thailand	Ho Chi Minh City, Vietnam
16:00 UTC+7		Report	Alisa 8', 28', 41', 65', 74'; Nisa 11', 15', 29'; Wilaiporn 34'; Orathai 70', 79'; Taneekarn 78'	Stadium: Thống Nhất Stadium; Attendance: 90; Referee: Seinn Cho Aung (Myanmar)

=== 2021 ===
18 October 2021 2022 AFC Asian Cup qualification	Laos	0–4	Chinese Taipei	Isa Town, Bahrain
18:00 UTC+3		Report	Chen Yen-ping 19'; Su Yu-hsuan 33'; Lai Li-chin 55', 60'	Stadium: Khalifa Sports City Stadium; Attendance: 85; Referee: Doumouh Al-Bakkar (Lebanon)

21 October 2021 2022 AFC Asian Cup qualification	Bahrain	0–0	Laos	Isa Town, Bahrain
18:00 UTC+3		Report		Stadium: Khalifa Sports City Stadium; Attendance: 302; Referee: Haneen Murad (Jordan)

=== 2022 ===
10 May 2022 2021 SEA Games GS	Myanmar	3–0	Laos	Cẩm Phả, Vietnam
21:30 UTC+7	Win Theingi Tun 30'; Khin Marlar Tun 57', 68'	Report		Stadium: Cẩm Phả Stadium; Referee: Choki Om (Bhutan)

13 May 2022 2021 SEA Games GS	Singapore	1–0	Laos	Cẩm Phả, Vietnam
16:00 UTC+7		Report	Izzati 90+5'	Stadium: Cẩm Phả Stadium; Referee: Esra'a Mahmoud (Jordan)

15 May 2022 2021 SEA Games GS	Laos	0–5	Thailand	Cẩm Phả, Vietnam
19:00 UTC+7		Report	Chatchawan 17'; Taneekarn 44', 60', 85'; Ploychompoo 57'	Stadium: Cẩm Phả Stadium; Referee: Doumouh Al Bakkar (Lebanon)

5 July 2022 2022 AFF Championship GS	Laos	1–1	Cambodia	Biñan, Philippines
19:00 UTC+8	Phimpha 21'	Report	Kunthea 90+1' (pen.)	Stadium: Biñan Football Stadium; Attendance: 110; Referee: Pansa Chaisanit (Thailand)

7 July 2022 2022 AFF Championship GS	Laos	2–0	Timor-Leste	Biñan, Philippines
16:00 UTC+8	Vady 14'; Aphatsala 84'	Report		Stadium: Biñan Football Stadium; Attendance: 62; Referee: Jhesa Mae Kaatz (Philippines)

9 July 2022 2022 AFF Championship GS	Vietnam	5–0	Laos	Biñan, Philippines
19:00 UTC+8	Phạm Hoàng Quỳnh 42'; Huỳnh Như 45+1', 72'; Phạm Hải Yến 57', 65'	Report		Stadium: Biñan Football Stadium; Attendance: 43; Referee: Pansa Chaisanit (Thailand)

11 July 2022 2022 AFF Championship GS	Myanmar	3–1	Laos	Biñan, Philippines
16:00 UTC+8	Panatida 39' (o.g.); Khin Marlar Tun 47'; July Kyaw 64'	Report	Aphatsala 66'	Stadium: Biñan Football Stadium; Attendance: 65; Referee: Jhesa Mae Kaatz (Philippines)

=== 2023 ===
3 May 2023 2023 SEA Games GS	Cambodia	2–0	Laos	Phnom Penh, Cambodia
20:00	Yoeurn 10', 37'	Report		Stadium: RSN Stadium; Attendance: 4,530

6 May 2023 2023 SEA Games GS	Laos	0–6	Thailand	Phnom Penh, Cambodia
16:00 UTC+7		Report	Jiraporn 9', 40', 90+6'; Saowalak 19'; Thanchanok 54'; Orapin 65'	Stadium: RSN Stadium; Attendance: 1,028

9 May 2023 2023 SEA Games GS	Singapore	2–1	Laos	Phnom Penh, Cambodia
20:00 UTC+7	Nicole 45+2'; Izzati 61'	Report	Dalavone 90'	Stadium: RCAF Old Stadium; Attendance: 364

18 September 2023 2023 Taif International Tournament GS	Laos	1–4	Lebanon	Taif, Saudi Arabia
17:30 UTC+3	Chinda 81'	Report	Arabi 13'; C. Iskandar 60'; Raed 65'; L. Iskandar 70'	Stadium: King Fahd Sports City; Referee: Nodira Mirzoeva (Tajikistan)

24 September 2023 2023 Taif International Tournament GS	Bhutan	0–0	Laos	Taif, Saudi Arabia
17:30 UTC+3		Report		Stadium: King Fahd Sports City

28 September 2023 2023 Taif International Tournament 5th place	Pakistan	1–1 (4–2 p)	Laos	Taif, Saudi Arabia
17:30 UTC+7	Z. Shah 58'	Report	Chaikham 63'	Stadium: King Fahd Sports City; Referee: Nodira Mirzoeva (Tajikistan)
	Penalties
	Z. Shah (penalty missed); Hirani (penalty scored); Malik (penalty scored); Malika-e-Noor (penalty scored); M. Khan (penalty scored)		(penalty missed) Phatthalavady; (penalty scored) Kemmy; (penalty scored) Phanykone; (penalty missed) Chinda; (penalty missed) Saysamone

=== 2024 ===
26 October 2024 Friendly	Malaysia	3–1	Laos	Dubai, United Arab Emirates
19:00 UTC+3	Barek 23'; Zamzaihiri 30'; Anjani 63'		Inthida 18'	Stadium: Police Officers' Club Stadium

29 October 2024 Friendly	Saudi Arabia	4–0	Laos	Dubai, United Arab Emirates
19:00 UTC+3	Tawfiq 51'; Mobarak 53', 70'; Abdulmohsen 84'			Stadium: Police Officers' Club Stadium

November 2024 2024 AFF Women's Cup GS	Timor-Leste	0–0	Laos	Vientiane, Laos
19:30 UTC+7				Stadium: New Laos National Stadium

November 2024 2024 AFF Women's Cup GS	Laos	0–1	Singapore	Vientiane, Laos
15:00 UTC+7			Chang 21'	Stadium: New Laos National Stadium

=== 2025 ===
29 June 2026 AFC Women's Asian Cup qualification	Nepal	9–0	Laos	Tashkent, Uzbekistan
17:00 UTC+5	Basnet 12'; Bhandari 45', 55', 74', 79'; Limbu 47'; Ghising 57'; K.C. 83'; Inthaphone 88' (o.g.)	Report		Stadium: Milliy Stadium; Referee: Wint War Tun (Myanmar)

2 July 2026 AFC Women's Asian Cup qualification	Laos	0–7	Uzbekistan	Tashkent, Uzbekistan
20:00 UTC+5		Report	Khabibullaeva 23'; Zoirova 34'; Kudratova 48', 90+3'; Shoyimova 81', 90+2'; Aminjonova 85'	Stadium: Milliy Stadium; Referee: Bùi Thị Thu Trang (Vietnam)

5 July 2026 AFC Women's Asian Cup qualification	Laos	2–0	Sri Lanka	Tashkent, Uzbekistan
17:00 UTC+5	Anuradhini 72' (o.g.); Inthaphone 90+2'	Report		Stadium: Milliy Stadium; Referee: Park Se-jin (South Korea)

=== 2026 ===
10 June 2026 Friendly	Saudi Arabia	4–0	Laos	Bangkok, Thailand
19:00 UTC+7	Al-Yahya 6'; Al-Omaysi 45+2', 70'; Abdullah 52'	Report		Stadium: Windmill Football Club Stadium; Referee: Supiree Testhomya (Thailand)

13 June 2026 Friendly	Saudi Arabia	5–1	Laos	Bangkok, Thailand
19:00 UTC+7	Abdullah 15', 52', 73'; Al-Saiari 75'; Balkhudher 77'		Chanthithong 71'	Stadium: Windmill Football Club Stadium

10 July 2026 AFF Women's Cup GS	Laos	1–1	Malaysia	Kuala Lumpur, Malaysia
20:45 UTC+8	Kemmy 37'	Report	Nurhadfina 50'	Stadium: Kuala Lumpur Stadium; Referee: Asaka Koizumi (Japan)

13 July 2026 AFF Women's Cup GS	Singapore	1–1	Laos	Kuala Lumpur, Malaysia
20:45 UTC+8	Tan 47'	Report	Anna 41'	Stadium: Kuala Lumpur Stadium; Referee: Bùi Thị Thu Trang (Vietnam)

19 July 2026 AFF Women's Cup SF	Cambodia	0–1	Laos	Kuala Lumpur, Malaysia
16:45 UTC+8			Anna 1'	Stadium: Kuala Lumpur Stadium

22 July 2026 AFF Women's Cup Final	Laos	0–5	Indonesia	Kuala Lumpur, Malaysia
20:45 UTC+8		Report	Hopper 33'; Nottet 48'; Loupatty 55'; De Zeeuw 68'; Nahon 84'	Stadium: Kuala Lumpur Stadium; Referee: Asaka Koizumi (Japan)

== See also ==
- Laos national football team results
