= Philippines women's national football team results (2020–present) =

- Win Draw Loss Void

This is a list of the Philippines women's national football team results from 2020 to the present.

== Results ==
=== 2021 ===
September 18 2022 AFC Women's Asian Cup qualification	Nepal	1–2	Philippines	Tashkent, Uzbekistan
15:00 UTC+5	Chaudhary 9'	Report	Annis 89'; Wilson 90+1'	Stadium: JAR Stadium; Referee: Anna Sidorova (Uzbekistan)

September 24 2022 AFC Women's Asian Cup qualification	Philippines	2–1	Hong Kong	Tashkent, Uzbekistan
--:-- UTC+5	Annis 17'; C. McDaniel 87'	Report	Chung Pui Ki 61'	Referee: Asaka Koizumi (Japan)

=== 2022 ===
January 21 2022 AFC Women's Asian Cup GS	Thailand	0–1	Philippines	Navi Mumbai, India
17:30 UTC+5:30		Report	McDaniel 81'	Stadium: DY Patil Stadium; Referee: Công Thị Dung (Vietnam)

January 24 2022 AFC Women's Asian Cup GS	Philippines	0–4	Australia	Mumbai, India
15:30 UTC+5:30		Report	Kerr 51'; Randle 53' (o.g.); Van Egmond 67'; Fowler 87'	Stadium: Mumbai Football Arena; Referee: Wang Chieh (Chinese Taipei)

January 27 2022 AFC Women's Asian Cup GS	Philippines	6–0	Indonesia	Pune, India
19:30 UTC+5:30	Guillou 6'; Bolden 27'; Annis 56', 82'; Miclat 74' (pen.); Cesar 90+4'	Report		Stadium: Shiv Chhatrapati Sports Complex; Referee: Kim Yu-jeong (South Korea)

January 30 2022 AFC Women's Asian Cup QF	Chinese Taipei	1–1 (a.e.t.) (3–4 p)	Philippines	Pune, India
19:30 UTC+5:30	Zhuo Li-ping 82'	Report	Quezada 49'	Stadium: Shiv Chhatrapati Sports Complex; Referee: Thein Thein Aye (Myanmar)
	Penalties
	Ting Chi (penalty scored); Wang Hsiang-huei (penalty scored); Chen Ying-hui (penalty scored); Hsu Yi-yun (penalty missed); Su Hsin-yun (penalty missed); Zhuo Li-ping (penalty missed)		(penalty scored) S. Castañeda; (penalty scored) Annis; (penalty missed) Miclat; (penalty missed) Long; (penalty scored) O. McDaniel; (penalty scored) Bolden

February 3 2022 AFC Women's Asian Cup SF	South Korea	2–0	Philippines	Pune, India
19:30 UTC+5:30	Cho So-hyun 4'; Son Hwa-yeon 34'	Report		Stadium: Shiv Chhatrapati Sports Complex; Referee: Pansa Chaisanit (Thailand)

April 7 Friendly	Philippines	7–2	Fiji	Sydney, Australia
17:00 UTC+10	Quezada 13', 79'; A. Castañeda 16', 44'; Randle 34'; Annis 39', 43'	Report	Nasau 49'; Volitikoro 63'	Stadium: Wanderers Football Park; Referee: Lara Lee (Australia)

April 11 Friendly	Fiji	0–8	Philippines	Sydney, Australia
15:00 UTC+10		Report	Harrison 10'; Quezada 25'; Guillou 31', 36', 55'; Frilles 49', 90+2'; Flanigan 60'	Stadium: Wanderers Football Park; Referee: Anna-Marie Keighley (New Zealand)

April 15 Unofficial friendly	Philippines	0–1	(Australia) Blacktown Spartans	Sydney, Australia
		Report	Crofts (?)	Stadium: Wanderers Football Park

April 22 Friendly	Philippines	16–0	Tonga	Sydney, Australia
17:00 UTC+10	Harrison 10'; Long 16', 34', 75'; Rodriguez 22', 51', 62'; Frilles 27', 32', 36', 49', 58'; A. Castañeda 31', 53'; 69' (o.g.); Annis 89'	Report		Stadium: Wanderers Football Park; Referee: Casey Reibelt (Australia)

April 30 Friendly	Tonga	0–5	Philippines	Sydney, Australia
		Report	Frilles 15'; A. Castañeda 17', 57'; Madarang 71', 85'	Stadium: Valentine Sports Park

May 9 2021 Southeast Asian Games GS	Philippines	5–0	Cambodia	Cẩm Phả, Vietnam
19:00 UTC+7	Flanigan 27'; Bolden 65'; Madarang 68'; Quezada 76'; A. Castañeda 79'	Report		Stadium: Cẩm Phả Stadium; Attendance: 5,120; Referee: Haruna Kanematsu (Japan)

May 11 2021 Southeast Asian Games GS	Vietnam	2–1	Philippines	Cẩm Phả, Vietnam
19:00 UTC+7	Nguyễn Thị Tuyết Dung 38'; Trần Thị Thùy Trang 50'	Report	Annis 15'	Stadium: Cẩm Phả Stadium; Attendance: 16,100; Referee: Rebecca Durcau (Australia)

May 14 2021 Southeast Asian Games GS	Indonesia	Cancelled	Philippines	Cẩm Phả, Vietnam
				Stadium: Cẩm Phả Stadium

May 18 2021 Southeast Asian Games SF	Thailand	3–0	Philippines	Cẩm Phả, Vietnam
16:00 UTC+7	Silawan 22'; Taneekarn 47'; Ploychompoo 90+1'	Report		Stadium: Cẩm Phả Stadium; Attendance: 3,565; Referee: Rebecca Durcau (Australia)

May 21 2021 Southeast Asian Games 3rd place	Myanmar	1–2	Philippines	Cẩm Phả, Vietnam
16:00 UTC+7	Win Theingi Tun 24'	Report	Bolden 73'; Quezada 76'	Stadium: Cẩm Phả Stadium; Attendance: 11,635; Referee: Lê Thị Ly (Vietnam)

June 19 Friendly	Republic of Ireland	1–0	Philippines	Antalya, Turkey
18:00 UTC+3	Agg 37'	Report		Stadium: Bellis Hotel Sports Center; Referee: Gamze Durmas Pakkan (Turkey)

June 23 Friendly	Bosnia and Herzegovina	0–3	Philippines	Brežice, Slovenia
18:00 UTC+2		Report	Shelton 7'; Bolden 38', 82'	Stadium: Terme Čatež; Referee: Aleksandra Česen (Slovenia)

June 26 Friendly	Philippines	2–1	Bosnia and Herzegovina	Brežice, Slovenia
11:00 UTC+2	Quezada 85'; Guillou 90'	Report	Kapetanović 11'	Stadium: Terme Čatež; Referee: Tanja Subotić (Slovenia)

July 4 2022 AFF Women's Championship	Philippines	1–0	Australia	Manila, Philippines
19:00 UTC+8	Bolden 60'	Report		Stadium: Rizal Memorial Stadium; Attendance: 1,405; Referee: Thein Thein Aye (Myanmar)

July 6 2022 AFF Women's Championship	Philippines	7–0	Singapore	Manila, Philippines
19:00 UTC+8	Flanigan 9'; Sulastri 10' (o.g.); Annis 19'; Bolden 38'; Eggesvik 47'; Hawkinson 56'; Castañeda 69'	Report		Stadium: Rizal Memorial Stadium; Attendance: 647; Referee: Supiree Testhomya (Thailand)

July 8 2022 AFF Women's Championship	Malaysia	0–4	Philippines	Manila, Philippines
19:00 UTC+8		Report	Eggesvik 32'; Guillou 43'; Quezada 48'; Castañeda 72'	Stadium: Rizal Memorial Stadium; Attendance: 429; Referee: Thein Thein Aye (Myanmar)

July 10 2022 AFF Women's Championship	Philippines	4–1	Indonesia	Manila, Philippines
19:00 UTC+8	Annis 47'; Bolden 57', 63', 66'	Report	Carla 37'	Stadium: Rizal Memorial Stadium; Attendance: 1,464; Referee: Bùi Thị Thu Trang (Vietnam)

July 12 2022 AFF Women's Championship	Thailand	1–0	Philippines	Manila, Philippines
19:00 UTC+8	Kanyanat 75'	Report		Stadium: Rizal Memorial Stadium; Attendance: 2,923; Referee: Thein Thein Aye (Myanmar)

July 15 2022 AFF Women's Championship SF	Vietnam	0–4	Philippines	Manila, Philippines
20:00 UTC+8			Long 31'; Annis 50' (pen.); Bolden 61', 70'	Stadium: Rizal Memorial Stadium; Attendance: 3,233; Referee: Pansa Chaisanit (Thailand)

July 17 2022 AFF Women's Championship Final	Thailand	0–3	Philippines	Manila, Philippines
19:30 UTC+8		Report	Cowart 7'; Guillou 19'; Bolden 88'	Stadium: Rizal Memorial Stadium; Attendance: 8,257; Referee: Bùi Thị Thu Trang (Vietnam)

September 6 Friendly	New Zealand	2–1	Philippines	Fullerton, United States
17:00 UTC−7	Moore 70' (pen.); Riley 83'	Report	Bolden 45+1'	Stadium: Titan Stadium (Cal State Fullerton); Referee: Danielle Chesky (USA)

October 7 Friendly	Costa Rica	1–1	Philippines	Alajuela, Costa Rica
19:00 UTC−6	Chinchilla 57'	Report	Guillou 90+3'	Stadium: Estadio Alejandro Morera Soto; Referee: Astrid Gramajo (Guatemala)

October 11 Friendly	Costa Rica	2–1	Philippines	San José, Costa Rica
11:00 UTC−6	Rodríguez 61' (pen.); VillaLobos 68'	Report	Frilles 45+2'	Stadium: Estadio Ricardo Saprissa Aymá; Referee: Annays Rosario (Puerto Rico)

November 12 Friendly	Chile	1–1	Philippines	Viña del Mar, Chile
19:00 UTC−4	Keefe 84'	Report	Long 26'	Stadium: Estadio Sausalito; Referee: Anahi Fernández (Uruguay)

November 15 Friendly	Chile	1–0	Philippines	Santiago, Chile
19:00 UTC−4	Araya 24'	Report		Stadium: Estadio Municipal de La Pintana; Referee: Nadia Fuques (Uruguay)

December 11 Friendly	Papua New Guinea	1–5	Philippines	Sydney, Australia
19:00 UTC+11	Maneo 58'		Frilles 29', 60'; Annis 39'; Madarang 56'; Serrano 77'	Stadium: Wanderers Football Park

December 15 Friendly	Philippines	9–0	Papua New Guinea	Sydney, Australia
19:00 UTC+11	Eggesvik 10'; Guillou 23', 72' (pen.); Cowart 46'; Annis 53'; Natera 55' (o.g.); Quezada 65', 85', 87'			Stadium: Wanderers Football Park

=== 2023 ===
February 15 2023 Pinatar Cup	Wales	1–0	Philippines	San Pedro del Pinatar, Spain
20:30 UTC+1	Green 45' (pen.)	Report		Stadium: Pinatar Arena; Referee: Lucie Šulcová (Czech Republic)

February 18 2023 Pinatar Cup	Philippines	1–2	Scotland	San Pedro del Pinatar, Spain
15:00 UTC+1	Serrano 90'	Report	Davidson 39'; Corsie 57'	Stadium: Pinatar Arena; Referee: Zuzana Valentová (Slovakia)

February 21 2023 Pinatar Cup	Iceland	5–0	Philippines	San Pedro del Pinatar, Spain
20:30 UTC+1	Andradóttir 20', 51'; Magnúsdóttir 71'; Eiríksdóttir 80'; Jóhannsdóttir 90+3'	Report		Stadium: Pinatar Arena; Referee: Zuzana Valentová (Slovakia)

April 5 2024 AFC Olympic Qualifiers–Round 1	Philippines	4–0	Pakistan	Hisor, Tajikistan
16:00 UTC+5	Long 21'; Bolden 25'; Madarang 29'; C. McDaniel 85'	Report		Stadium: Hisor Central Stadium; Attendance: 100; Referee: Dong Fangyu (China)

April 8 2024 AFC Olympic Qualifiers–Round 1	Tajikistan	0–8	Philippines	Hisor, Tajikistan
19:00 UTC+5		Report	Harrison 26'; Annis 28'; Frilles 31'; Quezada 35'; Serrano 38'; Alcantara 45+3'; McDaniel 59', 88'	Stadium: Hisor Central Stadium

April 11 2024 AFC Olympic Qualifiers–Round 1	Philippines	4–0	Hong Kong	Hisor, Tajikistan
19:00 UTC+5	Bolden 5', 41'; Serrano 44'; Quezada 53'			Stadium: Hisor Central Stadium

May 3 2023 Southeast Asian Games	Philippines	0–1	Myanmar	Phnom Penh, Cambodia
			Win Theingi Tun 89' (pen.)	Stadium: RCAF Stadium

May 6 2023 Southeast Asian Games	Malaysia	0–1	Philippines	Phnom Penh, Cambodia
			Bolden 90+6'	Stadium: RCAF Stadium

May 9 2023 Southeast Asian Games	Vietnam	1–2	Philippines	Phnom Penh, Cambodia
	Nguyễn Thị Bích Thùy 40'		Bolden 12' (pen.); Long 82'	Stadium: RSN Stadium

July 14 Unofficial friendly	Philippines	0–3	United States	Auckland, New Zealand
		Report

July 17 Unofficial friendly	Sweden	5–1	Philippines	Wellington, New Zealand
	Blackstenius (3x); Rolfö; Kaneryd	Report 1, 2	Beard	Stadium: NZ Campus of Innovation & Sport; Attendance: 0 (Behind closed doors)

July 21 2023 FIFA Women's World Cup GS	Philippines	0–2	Switzerland	Dunedin, New Zealand
17:00 UTC+12		Report	Bachmann 45' (pen.); Piubel 64'	Stadium: Forsyth Barr Stadium; Attendance: 13,711; Referee: Vincentia Amedome (Togo)

July 25 2023 FIFA Women's World Cup GS	New Zealand	0–1	Philippines	Wellington, New Zealand
17:30 UTC+12		Report	Bolden 24'	Stadium: Wellington Regional Stadium; Referee: Katia García (Mexico)

July 30 2023 FIFA Women's World Cup GS	Norway	6–0	Philippines	Auckland, New Zealand
19:00 UTC+12	Román Haug 6', 17', 90+5'; Graham Hansen 31'; Barker 48' (o.g.); Reiten 53' (pen.)			Stadium: Eden Park; Attendance: 34,697; Referee: Marie-Soleil Beaudoin (Canada)

September 22 2022 Asian Games	Hong Kong	1–3	Philippines	Wenzhou, China
16:00 UTC+8	Cheung Wai Ki 38'	Report	Bolden 8' (pen.); Quezada 89'; Guillou 90+1'	Stadium: Wenzhou Sports Centre; Attendance: 2,522; Referee: Lara Christie Lee (Australia)

September 25 2022 Asian Games	Philippines	1–5	South Korea	Wenzhou, China
19:30 UTC+8	Bolden 8'	Report	Chun Ga-ram 12'; Son Hwa-yeon 44', 56', 70'; Ji So-yun 52' (pen.)	Stadium: Wenzhou Sports Centre; Attendance: 2,974; Referee: Asaka Koizumi (Japan)

September 28 2022 Asian Games	Philippines	3–0	Myanmar	Wenzhou, China
19:30 UTC+8	Bolden 19' (pen.); Eggesvik 60', 61'	Report		Stadium: Wenzhou Sports Centre; Attendance: 4,436; Referee: Asaka Koizumi (Japan)

September 30 2022 Asian Games QF	Japan	8–1	Philippines	Wenzhou, China
19:30 UTC+8	Tanikawa 40' (pen.); Osawa 58', 90+4'; Chiba 65'; Ueno 76' (pen.), 78', 81', 90+1'	Report	Bolden 68'	Stadium: Wenzhou Olympic Sports Centre Stadium; Attendance: 33,607; Referee: Casey Reibelt (Australia)

October 26 2024 AFC Olympic Qualifiers Round 2	Chinese Taipei	1–4	Philippines	Perth, Australia
16:00 UTC+8	Hsu Yi-yun 47'	Report	Bolden 54' (pen.), 83'; Guillou 61'; C. McDaniel 90'	Stadium: Perth Rectangular Stadium; Attendance: 2,725; Referee: Asaka Koizumi (Japan)

October 29 2024 AFC Olympic Qualifiers Round 2	Philippines	0–8	Australia	Perth, Australia
15:10 UTC+8		Report	Fowler 15'; Kerr 19', 45+2', 46'; Foord 30', 34', 56'; Wheeler 72'	Stadium: Perth Stadium; Attendance: 59,155; Referee: Ranjita Devi Tekcham (India)

November 1 2024 AFC Olympic Qualifiers Round 2	Philippines	1–0	Iran	Perth, Australia
15:50 UTC+8	Annis 19'	Report		Stadium: Perth Rectangular Stadium; Attendance: 3,111; Referee: Yu Hong (China)

=== 2024 ===
February 21 Friendly	Finland	4–0	Philippines	San Pedro del Pinatar, Spain
15:00 UTC+1	Sevenius 24', 43', 72'; Nyström 28'	Report		Stadium: Pinatar Arena; Attendance: 300; Referee: Katalin Sipos (Hungary)

February 24 2024 Pinatar Cup SF	Philippines	0–2	Scotland	San Pedro del Pinatar, Spain
		Report	Martha Thomas 23', 36'	Stadium: Pinatar Arena; Attendance: 200; Referee: Jana Adámková (Czech Republic)

February 27 2024 Pinatar Cup 3rd	Philippines	0–1	Slovenia	San Pedro del Pinatar, Spain
20:30 UTC+1			Golob 5'	Stadium: Pinatar Arena; Attendance: 30; Referee: Katalin Sipos (Hungary)

April 5 Friendly	South Korea	3–0	Philippines	Icheon, South Korea
19:00 UTC+9	Yu-ri 73'; So-yun 76'; Sel-gi 88'	Report		Stadium: Icheon Sports Complex; Referee: Azusa Sugino (Japan)

April 8 Friendly	South Korea	2–1	Philippines	Icheon, South Korea
19:00 UTC+9	Choo Hyo-joo 1'; Choe Yu-ri 33'	Report	Beard 74'	Stadium: Icheon Sports Complex

October 26 2024 Pink Ladies Cup	Philippines	3–0	Jordan	Antalya, Turkey
16:00 UTC+3	Bolden 2', 68' (pen.); Guillou 77' (pen.)	Report		Stadium: Emirhan Sports Complex

October 30 2024 Pink Ladies Cup	Philippines	1–4	Kenya	Antalya, Turkey
16:00 UTC+3	Bolden 67' (pen.)	Report	Wambui 8'; Long 37' (o.g.); Alukwe 68'; Adhiambo 82'	Stadium: Emirhan Sports Complex

=== 2025 ===
April 4 Friendly	United Arab Emirates	1–4	Philippines	Dubai, United Arab Emirates
19:30 UTC+4	Juma 89'	Report	Long 8'; C. McDaniel 19', 33'; Serrano 31'	Stadium: Theyab Awana Stadium

April 8 Friendly	United Arab Emirates	0–4	Philippines	Dubai, United Arab Emirates
19:30 UTC+4		Report	Eggesvik 37'; Frilles 54'; Long 62'; C. McDaniel 74'	Stadium: Theyab Awana Stadium

May 30 Unofficial Friendly	Philippines	0–1	Chinese Taipei	Manila, Philippines
19:00 UTC+8		Report		Stadium: Rizal Memorial Stadium; Attendance: 0 (closed doors)

June 3 Friendly	Philippines	0–1	Chinese Taipei	Manila, Philippines
19:00 UTC+8		Report	Matsunaga 27'	Stadium: Rizal Memorial Stadium; Attendance: 3,312; Referee: Nurul Ain Izatty Binti Zainal (Malaysia)

June 29 2026 AFC Women's Asian Cup qualification	Philippines	3–0	Saudi Arabia	Phnom Penh, Cambodia
16:00 UTC+7	Sawicki 16'; Serrano 55'; Pino 81'	Report		Stadium: Olympic Stadium; Referee: Sunita Thongthawin (Thailand)

July 2 2026 AFC Women's Asian Cup qualification	Cambodia	0–6	Philippines	Phnom Penh, Cambodia
19:00 UTC+7		Report	Pino 18'; Serrano 19', 36'; Nimol 40' (o.g.); Long 48'; C.McDaniel 56'	Stadium: Olympic Stadium; Referee: Oh Hyeon-jeong (South Korea)

July 5 2026 AFC Women's Asian Cup qualification	Philippines	1–0	Hong Kong	Phnom Penh, Cambodia
19:00 UTC+7	C.McDaniel 4'	Report		Stadium: Olympic Stadium; Referee: Lê Thị Ly (Vietnam)

August 7 2025 ASEAN Women's Championship	Philippines	7–0	Timor-Leste	Phú Thọ, Vietnam
19:30 UTC+7	Schinaman 2'; Quezada 7', 32'; Long 9'; Tolentin 57', 64'; Wyrzynski 75'	Report		Stadium: Việt Trì Stadium; Referee: Songkran Bunmeekiart (Thailand)

August 10 2025 ASEAN Women's Championship	Australia U23	1–0	Philippines	Phú Thọ, Vietnam
19:30 UTC+7	Jancevski 45+1'	Report		Stadium: Việt Trì Stadium

August 13 2025 ASEAN Women's Championship	Philippines	1–1	Myanmar	Haiphong, Vietnam
19:30 UTC+7	Mathelus 71'	Report	Win Theingi Tun 33' (pen.)	Stadium: Lạch Tray Stadium

October 29 Friendly	Philippines	2–2	Uzbekistan	Manila, Philippines
19:00 UTC+8	C. McDaniel 2'; Serrano 57'	Report	Khabibullaeva 67', 81'	Stadium: Rizal Memorial Stadium; Attendance: 3,106

December 5 2025 SEA Games	Myanmar	2–1	Philippines	Chonburi, Thailand
16:00 UTC+7	Win Theingi Tun 4'; May Htet Lu 89'	Report	Ramirez 69'	Stadium: IPE Chonburi Stadium

December 8 2025 SEA Games	Philippines	1–0	Vietnam	Chonburi, Thailand
18:30 UTC+7	Ramirez 90+4'	Report		Stadium: Chonburi Stadium; Referee: Gulshoda Saidqulova (Uzbekistan)

December 11 2025 SEA Games	Philippines	6–0	Malaysia	Chonburi, Thailand
16:00 UTC+7	Pino 45', 53', 70' (pen.); Cowart 68'; Markey 85'; Castañeda 90+6'	Report		Stadium: IPE Chonburi Stadium; Referee: Sunita Thongthawin (Thailand)

December 14 2025 SEA Games SF	Thailand	1–1 (a.e.t.) (2–4 p)	Philippines	Chonburi, Thailand
18:30 UTC+7	Jiraporn 53'	Report	Guy 87' (pen.)	Stadium: Chonburi Stadium; Referee: Esra'a Almbaidin (Jordan)
	Penalties
	Jiraporn (penalty scored); Taneekarn (penalty scored); Pluemjai (penalty missed); Orapin (penalty missed)		(penalty scored) Guy; (penalty scored) Carpio; (penalty scored) Eggesvik; (penalty scored) Long

December 17 2025 SEA Games Gold medal match	Philippines	0–0 (a.e.t.) (6–5 p)	Vietnam	Chonburi, Thailand
19:30 UTC+7		Report		Stadium: Chonburi Stadium; Referee: Rebecca Durcau (Australia)
	Penalties
	Guy (penalty scored); Pino (penalty scored); Long (penalty scored); Beard (penalty scored); Markey (penalty scored); Sawicki (penalty scored)		(penalty scored) Huỳnh Như; (penalty scored) Ngọc Minh Chuyên; (penalty scored) Nguyễn Thị Trúc Hương; (penalty scored) Hoàng Thị Loan; (penalty scored) Cù Thị Huỳnh Như; (penalty missed) Trần Thị Thu

=== 2026 ===
March 1 2026 AFC Women's Asian Cup GS	Australia	1–0	Philippines	Perth, Australia
17:00 UTC+8	Kerr 14'	Report (AFC); Report (FIFA)		Stadium: Perth Stadium; Attendance: 44,379; Referee: Dong Fangyu (China)

March 5 2026 AFC Women's Asian Cup GS	Philippines	0–3	South Korea	Gold Coast, Australia
13:00 UTC+10		Report (AFC); Report (FIFA)	Jeon Yu-gyeong 12'; Park Soo-jeong 15'; Mun Eun-ju 56'	Stadium: Gold Coast Stadium; Attendance: 2,332; Referee: Lê Thị Ly (Vietnam)

March 8 AFC Women's Asian Cup GS	Iran	0–2	Philippines	Gold Coast, Australia
19:00 UTC+10		Report (AFC); Report (FIFA)	Eggesvik 29'; C. Mcdaniel 82'	Stadium: Gold Coast Stadium; Attendance: 2,384; Referee: Jin Tian (China)

March 15 AFC Women's Asian Cup QF	Japan	7–0	Philippines	Sydney, Australia
16:00 UTC+11	Takana 45'; Koga 45+3', 76'; Chiba 65'; Matsukubo 67'; Tanikawa 86'; Ueki 90'	Report (AFC); Report (FIFA)		Stadium: Accor Stadium; Attendance: 17,205; Referee: Dong Fangyu (China)

March 19 AFC Women's Asian Cup PI	Uzbekistan	0–2	Philippines	Gold Coast, Australia
13:00 UTC+10		Report (AFC); Report (FIFA)	Beard 47'; Sawicki 52'	Stadium: Gold Coast Stadium; Attendance: 1,922; Referee: Casey Reibelt (Australia)

June 4 Unofficial Friendly	San Diego Wave (United States)	1–0	Philippines	San Diego, United States
--:-- UTC−7	(o.g.)	Report

June 9 Unofficial Friendly	Albion San Diego (United States)	0–2	Philippines	San Diego, United States
11:30 UTC−7		Report	C. McDaniel; Oca	Stadium: Point Loma Nazarene University

September 14 2026 Asian Games GS	Philippines	1–1	Uzbekistan	Gifu, Japan
14:00 UTC+9	Collins 89'	Report	Egamberdieva 81'	Stadium: Gifu Nagaragawa Stadium; Referee: Lê Thị Ly (Vietnam)

September 17 2026 Asian Games GS	Hong Kong	–	Philippines	Gifu, Japan
19:00 UTC+9				Stadium: Gifu Nagaragawa Stadium

September 21 2026 Asian Games GS	China	–	Philippines	Gifu, Japan
16:00 UTC+9				Stadium: Gifu Nagaragawa Stadium

October 9 Friendly	Peru	v	Philippines	Chincha Alta, Peru
15:00 UTC−5				Stadium: Videnita de Chincha

October 13 Friendly	Peru	v	Philippines	Chincha Alta, Peru
14:00 UTC−5				Stadium: Videnita de Chincha

== See also ==
- Philippines women's national football team results
- Philippines women's national football team results (1981–1999)
- Philippines women's national football team results (2000–2009)
- Philippines women's national football team results (2010–2019)
