= Nierras =

Nierras is a surname. Notable people with the surname include:

- Ernest Nierras, Filipino football head coach
- Samantha Nierras (born 1989), Filipino footballer
