= ASEAN Women's Championship =

- Organiser(s): AFF
- Founded: 2004
- Region: Southeast Asia
- Current champions: Australia U23 (1st title)
- Most championships: Thailand (4 titles)
- Website: aseanutdfc.com
- 2025 ASEAN Women's Championship

The ASEAN Women's Championship (formerly the AFF Women's Championship), currently known as the MSIG Serenity Cup for sponsorship reasons, is the competition in women's football organized by the ASEAN Football Federation.

== Results ==
A 2017 edition was planned in Thailand but was later cancelled by the ASEAN Football Federation in February 2017 citing the big amount of major women's football tournament already scheduled in Asia for the year. The 2020 edition to be held in the Philippines was also postponed to 2021, and later rescheduled in 2022 due to the COVID-19 pandemic.

Year	Host	Final			Third Place Match
Year	Host	Champions	Score	Runners-up	Third Place	Score	Fourth Place
2004; Details	Vietnam	Myanmar	2–2 (a.e.t.) (4–2 p)	Vietnam B	Vietnam	4–1	Indonesia
2006; Details	Vietnam	Vietnam	round-robin	Chinese Taipei	Thailand	round-robin	Myanmar
2007; Details	Myanmar	Myanmar	1–1 (a.e.t.) (4–1 p)	Thailand	Vietnam	6–0	Malaysia
2008; Details	Vietnam	Australia	1–0	Vietnam	Thailand	3–0	Myanmar
2011; Details	Laos	Thailand	2–1	Myanmar	Vietnam	6–0	Laos
2012; Details	Vietnam	Vietnam	0–0 (a.e.t.) (4–3 p)	Myanmar	Thailand	14–1	Laos
2013; Details	Myanmar	Japan U23	1–1 (a.e.t.) (5–3 p)	Australia U20	Vietnam	3–1	Myanmar
2015; Details	Vietnam	Thailand	3–2	Myanmar	Australia U20	4–3	Vietnam
2016; Details	Myanmar	Thailand	1–1 (a.e.t.) (6–5 p)	Vietnam	Myanmar	1–0	Australia U20
2018; Details	Indonesia	Thailand	3–2	Australia U20	Vietnam	3–0	Myanmar
2019; Details	Thailand	Vietnam	1–0 (a.e.t.)	Thailand	Myanmar	3–0	Philippines
2022; Details	Philippines	Philippines	3–0	Thailand	Myanmar	4–3	Vietnam
2025; Details	Vietnam	Australia U23	1–0	Myanmar	Vietnam	3–1	Thailand
2027; Details

== Teams reaching the top four ==
Team	Champions	Runners-up	Third Place	Fourth Place	Total
Thailand / Thailand U20	4 (2011, 2015, 2016, 2018)	3 (2007, 2019, 2022)	3 (2006, 2008, 2012)	1 (2025)	11
Vietnam / Vietnam B	3 (2006, 2012, 2019)	3 (2004, 2008, 2016)	6 (2004, 2007, 2011, 2013, 2018, 2025)	2 (2015, 2022)	14
Myanmar	2 (2004, 2007)	4 (2011, 2012, 2015, 2025)	3 (2016, 2019, 2022)	4 (2006, 2008, 2013, 2018)	13
Australia / Australia U23 / Australia U20	2 (2008, 2025)	2 (2013, 2018)	1 (2015)	1 (2016)	6
Japan U23	1 (2013)	—	—	—	1
Philippines	1 (2022)	—	—	1 (2019)	2
Chinese Taipei	—	1 (2006)	—	—	1
Laos	—	—	—	2 (2011, 2012)	2
Indonesia	—	—	—	1 (2004)	1
Malaysia	—	—	—	1 (2007)	1

== Overall team records ==
In this ranking 3 points are awarded for a win, 1 for a draw and 0 for a loss. As per statistical convention in football, matches decided in extra time are counted as wins and losses, while matches decided by penalty shoot-outs are counted as draws. Teams are ranked by total points, then by goal difference, then by goals scored.

As of 2025 AFF Women's Championship

Rank	Team	Part	Pld	W	D	L	GF	GA	GD	Pts
1	Vietnam	13	67	49	7	11	283	52	+231	154
2	Thailand	13	63	43	6	14	262	54	+208	135
3	Myanmar	13	67	38	7	22	219	84	+135	121
4	Australia	7	37	26	4	7	140	30	+110	82
5	Philippines	12	45	18	3	24	95	111	−16	57
6	Laos	7	27	9	1	17	39	114	−75	28
7	Malaysia	10	37	7	3	27	42	139	−97	24
8	Indonesia	10	37	5	4	28	24	160	−136	19
9	Japan U23	1	6	5	1	0	22	4	+18	16
10	Vietnam B	1	5	4	1	0	16	2	+14	13
11	Singapore	9	31	2	2	27	12	158	−146	8
12	Cambodia	4	14	2	2	10	18	73	−55	8
13	Chinese Taipei	1	3	1	1	1	4	2	+2	4
14	Jordan	1	4	1	0	3	2	13	−11	3
15	Timor-Leste	5	18	1	0	17	3	142	−139	3
16	Maldives	1	3	0	0	3	0	43	−43	0

== Comprehensive team results by tournament ==
Legend

- 1st — Champions
- 2nd — Runners-up
- 3rd — Third place
- 4th — Fourth place
- GS — Group stage
- Q — Qualified for the current tournament
- • – Did not qualify
- × — Did not enter / Withdrew / Banned
- — Hosts

Team	(Vietnam) 2004 (8)	(Vietnam) 2006 (4)	(Myanmar) 2007 (8)	(Vietnam) 2008 (9)	(Laos) 2011 (8)	(Vietnam) 2012 (7)	(Myanmar) 2013 (10)	(Vietnam) 2015 (8)	(Myanmar) 2016 (8)	(Indonesia) 2018 (10)	(Thailand) 2019 (9)	(Philippines) 2022 (11)	(Vietnam) 2025 (8)	Total
Australia	Not AFF member			1st (Note: Competed as guest.)	Not AFF member		×	×	×	×	×	×	×	1
Cambodia	×	×	×	×	×	×	×	×	×	GS	GS	GS	GS	4
Timor-Leste	×	×	×	×	×	×	×	×	GS	GS	GS	GS	GS	5
Indonesia	4th	×	GS	GS	GS	×	GS	GS	×	GS	GS	GS	GS	10
Laos	×	×	GS	GS	4th	4th	GS	GS	×	×	×	GS	•	7
Malaysia	×	×	4th	GS	GS	GS	GS	GS	GS	GS	GS	GS	•	10
Myanmar	1st	4th	1st	4th	2nd	2nd	4th	2nd	3rd	4th	3rd	3rd	2nd	13
Philippines	GS	×	GS	GS	GS	GS	GS	GS	GS	GS	4th	1st	GS	12
Singapore	GS	×	GS	GS	GS	GS	×	×	GS	GS	GS	GS	×	9
Thailand	×	3rd	2nd	3rd	1st	3rd	GS	1st	1st	1st	2nd	2nd	4th	12
Vietnam	3rd	1st	3rd	2nd	3rd	1st	3rd	4th	2nd	3rd	1st	4th	3rd	13
Secondary/youth teams
Australia U20	×	×	×	×	×	×	2nd	3rd	4th	2nd	×	×	×	4
Australia U23	×	×	×	×	×	×	×	×	×	×	×	GS	1st	2
Thailand U20	GS	×	×	×	×	×	×	×	×	×	×	×	×	1
Vietnam B	2nd	×	×	×	×	×	×	×	×	×	×	×	×	1
Invitee nations
Chinese Taipei	×	2nd	×	×	×	×	×	×	×	×	×	×	×	1
Japan U23	×	×	×	×	×	×	1st	×	×	×	×	×	×	1
Jordan	×	×	×	×	×	×	GS	×	×	×	×	×	×	1
Maldives	GS	×	×	×	×	×	×	×	×	×	×	×	×	1

== Awards ==
=== Winning coaches ===
Year	Team	Coach
2004	Myanmar	
2006	Vietnam	(Vietnam) Trần Ngọc Thái Tuấn
2007	Myanmar	
2008	Australia	(Scotland) Tom Sermanni
2011	Thailand	(Thailand) Piyakul Kaewnamkang
2012	Vietnam	(China) Chen Yunfa
2013	Japan U23	(Japan) Hiroyuki Horino
2015	Thailand	(Thailand) Nuengrutai Srathongvian
2016	Thailand	(England) Spencer Prior
2018	Thailand	(Thailand) Nuengrutai Srathongvian
2019	Vietnam	(Vietnam) Mai Đức Chung
2022	Philippines	(Australia) Alen Stajcic
2025	Australia U23	(Australia) Joe Palatsides

=== Top goalscorers ===
Year	Goalscorers	Goals
2004	(Myanmar) Malar Win	9
2006		
2007	(Vietnam) Đỗ Thị Ngọc Châm	9
2008	(Myanmar) My Nilar Htwe	6
2011	(Vietnam) Nguyễn Thị Hòa	9
2012	(Vietnam) Nguyễn Thị Muôn	7
2013	(Philippines) Joana Houplin	8
2015	(Thailand) Nisa Romyen	9
2016	(Myanmar) Win Theingi Tun	9
2018	(Australia) Mary Fowler	10
2019	(Myanmar) Yee Yee Oo	8
2022	(Philippines) Sarina Bolden	8
2025	(Myanmar) Win Theingi Tun	7

== See also ==
- ASEAN Championship
- CAFA Women's Championship
- EAFF E-1 Football Championship (women)
- SAFF Women's Championship
- WAFF Women's Championship
- AFC Women's Asian Cup
- AFF Women's Cup
