= Yoshinori Kumada =

Japanese footballer and manager

Personal information
- Birth name: Yoshinori Kumada
- Date of birth: 25 August 1961
- Place of birth: Shirakawa, Fukushima, Japan

Senior career*
Years	Team	Apps	(Gls)
- ANA Yokohama

Managerial career
- 1997: Fukushima FC
- 1998–????: Osaka Gakuin University
- 2010: Daekyeung University
- 2011–2019: Myanmar (women)
- Myanmar Women U19
- 2013: Myanmar Women U23
- * Club domestic league appearances and goals

Yoshinori Kumada (熊田 喜則, Kumada Yoshinori; born 25 August 1961 in Shirakawa, Fukushima) is a Japanese football coach who is the manager of the Myanmar women's national football team.

== Coaching career ==
Coaching a host of teams in his native Japan and retiring as a player aged 28, Yoshinori was chosen to manage the Myanmar women's national football team in 2011, leading them at the 2011 AFF Women's Championship.

Leading Myanmar to a 5–0 win over Laos in the opening fixture of the 2013 AFF Women's Championship and guiding them to the semi-final of the tournament, Yoshinori claimed the 2013 Women's AFF Coach of the Year Award. He helped Myanmar qualify for the 2014 Asian Cup through an unbeaten record in the qualifying stage where they conceded zero goals. He cited teamwork to their success.

He submitted a complaint to the Asian Football Confederation for the reportedly poor officiating of Indian referee Maria Rebello in a 2–2 draw with Thailand at the semi-final of the 2013 SEA Games.

He left the post of the coach of Myanmar in December 2019.
