= Philippines women's national football team results =

The international fixtures and results of the Philippines women's national football team:

- Philippines women's national football team results (1981–1999)
- Philippines women's national football team results (2000–2009)
- Philippines women's national football team results (2010–2019)
- Philippines women's national football team results (2020–present)
