= 2013 AFF Women's Championship =

2013 AFF AYA Bank Women's Championship

Tournament details
- Host country: Myanmar
- City: Yangon
- Dates: 9–22 September 2013
- Teams: 10 (from 3 sub-confederations)
- Venues: 2 (in 1 host city)

Final positions
- Champions: Japan U23 (1st title)
- Runners-up: Australia U20
- Third place: Vietnam
- Fourth place: Myanmar

Tournament statistics
- Matches played: 24
- Goals scored: 94 (3.92 per match)
- Top scorer: (Philippines) Joana Houplin (8 goals)

The 2013 AFF Women's Championship, known as the 2013 AFF AYA Bank Women's Championship for sponsorship reasons, was the seventh edition of the tournament, the women's football championship of Southeast Asia. It was held from 9 to 22 September 2013 in Yangon, Myanmar.

Though not an AFF member nation, a Japanese selection side was invited to the tournament. They won the final over Australia.

== Group stage ==
All times listed are Myanmar Standard Time (UTC+6:30)

=== Group A ===
Team	Pld	W	D	L	GF	GA	GD	Pts
Australia U20	4	3	1	0	9	3	+6	10
Vietnam	4	2	2	0	5	0	+5	8
Thailand	4	2	1	1	12	3	+9	7
Jordan	4	1	0	3	2	13	−11	3
Malaysia	4	0	0	4	0	9	−9	0

9 September 2013
15:30

Thailand	0–0	Vietnam
	Report

Thuwunna Stadium, Yangon
Referee: Thein Thein Aye (Myanmar)
9 September 2013
19:30

Jordan	1–0	Malaysia
Al-Naber 83'	Report

Thuwunna Stadium, Yangon
Referee: Seinn Cho Aung (Myanmar)

11 September 2013
15:30

Malaysia	0–1	Australia U20
	Report	Whitfield 75'

Thuwunna Stadium, Yangon
Referee: Law Bik Chi (Hong Kong)
11 September 2013
19:30

Jordan	0–4	Thailand
	Report	Nisa 12', 74', 75'; Rattikan 59'

Thuwunna Stadium, Yangon
Referee: Aye Aye Maw (Myanmar)

13 September 2013
15:30

Australia U20	5–1	Jordan
Raso 5', 65'; Andrews 10', 20'; Logarzo 78'	Report	Jebreen 21'

Thuwunna Stadium, Yangon
13 September 2013
19:30

Vietnam	1–0	Malaysia
Lê Thị Thương 33'	Report

Thuwunna Stadium, Yangon

15 September 2013
15:30

Jordan	0–4	Vietnam
	Report	Lê Thị Thương 19'; Lê Thu Thanh Hương 30', 72'; Nguyễn Thị Muôn 84'

Thuwunna Stadium, Yangon
15 September 2013
19:30

Thailand	2–3	Australia U20
Wilaiporn 43'; Taneekarn 48'	Report	Raso 27', 61'; Harrison 41'

Thuwunna Stadium, Yangon

17 September 2013
16:00

Malaysia	0–6	Thailand
		Wilaiporn 28'; Nisa 36', 71', 74'; Taneekarn 57'; Alisa 84'

Aung San Stadium, Yangon
17 September 2013
16:00

Vietnam	0–0	Australia U20

Thuwunna Stadium, Yangon

=== Group B ===
Team	Pld	W	D	L	GF	GA	GD	Pts
Japan U23	4	4	0	0	19	2	+17	12
Myanmar (H)	4	3	0	1	14	4	+10	9
Philippines	4	2	0	2	15	11	+4	6
Laos	4	1	0	3	5	17	−12	3
Indonesia	4	0	0	4	1	20	−19	0

(H) Hosts
10 September 2013
15:30

Laos	0–5	Myanmar
	Report	San San Maw 32'; Khin Marlar Tun 53'; Yee Yee Oo 77'; Khin Moe Wai 79', 82'

Thuwunna Stadium, Yangon
Referee: Mai Hoàng Trang (Vietnam)
10 September 2013
19:30

Indonesia	0–6	Philippines
	Report	Houplin 7', 47', 73'; Wilson 51'; Cooke 79'; Park 85'

Thuwunna Stadium, Yangon
Referee: Rita Ghani (Malaysia)

12 September 2013
15:30

Philippines	1–4	Japan U23
Impelido 85'	Report	Tanaka 4'; Takahashi 20'; Hashiura 45+1'; Imai 79'

Thuwunna Stadium, Yangon
Referee: Rita Ghani (Malaysia)
12 September 2013
19:30

Indonesia	1–2	Laos
Tugiyati 45+2'	Report	Souchitta 54', 77'

Thuwunna Stadium, Yangon
Referee: Mai Hoàng Trang (Vietnam)

14 September 2013
15:30

Japan U23	8–0	Indonesia
Ozeki 18'; Takahashi 26', 38'; Mitsuhashi 45', 46', 68'; Komatsu 53'; Horiuchi 88'	Report

Thuwunna Stadium, Yangon
14 September 2013
19:30

Myanmar	5–1	Philippines
Moe Moe War 2'; Khin Moe Wai 21', 37', 86'; Yee Yee Oo 53'	Report	Houplin 75'

Thuwunna Stadium, Yangon

16 September 2013
15:30

Indonesia	0–4	Myanmar
	Report	Khin Than Wai 16'; San San Maw 20'; Margret Marri 23'; Yee Yee Oo 71'

Thuwunna Stadium, Yangon
16 September 2013
19:30

Laos	1–4	Japan U23
Souphavanh 22'	Report	Hashiura 66'; Takahashi 69', 84'; Imai 90+1'

Thuwunna Stadium, Yangon

18 September 2013
16:00

Philippines	7–2	Laos
Houplin 1', 3', 7', 31'; Alquiros 59'; Baysa 69'; Soriano 80'	Report	Souchitta 76' (pen.); Phonethip 90' (pen.)

Aung San Stadium, Yangon
18 September 2013
16:00

Myanmar	0–3	Japan U23
	Report	Hashiura 55', 85'; Takahashi 86'

Thuwunna Stadium, Yangon

== Knockout stage ==
Semi-finals
20 September – Yangon
Australia U20	2
Myanmar	1
20 September – Yangon
Japan U23 (a.e.t.)	2
Vietnam	1

Final
22 September – Yangon
Australia U20	1 (3)
Japan U23 (p)	1 (5)
Third Place
22 September – Yangon
Myanmar	1
Vietnam	3

=== Semi-finals ===
20 September 2013
15:30

Australia U20	2–1	Myanmar
Tobin 15'; Yeoman-Dale 77'	Report	Khin Moe Wai 1'

Thuwunna Stadium, Yangon
20 September 2013
19:30

Japan U23	2–1 (a.e.t.)	Vietnam
Sunaga 89'; Takahashi 94'	Report	Nguyễn Thị Minh Nguyệt 36'

Thuwunna Stadium, Yangon

=== Third place match ===
22 September 2013
15:30

Myanmar	1–3	Vietnam
San San Maw 24'		Nguyễn Thị Ngọc Anh 2'; Trần Thị Kim Hồng 14'; Nguyễn Thị Minh Nguyệt 66'

Thuwunna Stadium, Yangon

=== Final ===
22 September 2013
18:45

Australia U20	1–1 (a.e.t.)	Japan U23
Tobin 21'		Saga 48'
Penalties
Yeoman-Dale (penalty scored); Caroll (penalty scored); Caceres (penalty scored); Wheeler (penalty missed)	3–5	(penalty scored) Takahashi; (penalty scored) Saga; (penalty scored) Tanaka; (penalty scored) Mitsuhashi; (penalty scored) Imai

Thuwunna Stadium, Yangon

== Awards ==
2013 AFF Women's Championship Champions

Japan U23
First title

== Goalscorers ==
8 goals

- (Philippines) Joana Houplin

7 goals

- (Japan) Miyuki Takahashi

6 goals

- (Thailand) Nisa Romyen
- (Myanmar) Khin Moe Wai

4 goals

- (Australia) Hayley Raso
- (Japan) Haruka Imai

3 goals

- (Japan) Asuka Matsuhashi
- (Laos) Souchitta Phonharath
- (Myanmar) San San Maw
- (Myanmar) Yee Yee Oo

2 goals

- (Australia) Tara Andrews
- (Australia) Natalie Tobin
- (Japan) Satsuki Hashiura
- (Thailand) Taneekarn Dangda
- (Thailand) Wilaiporn Boothduang
- (Vietnam) Lê Thị Thương
- (Vietnam) Lê Thu Thanh Hương
- (Vietnam) Nguyễn Thị Minh Nguyệt

1 goal

- (Australia) Amy Harrison
- (Australia) Chloe Logarzo
- (Australia) Brittany Whitfield
- (Australia) Georgia Yeoman
- (Indonesia) Tugiyati Cindy
- (Japan) Sayaka Horiuchi
- (Japan) Mina Komatsu
- (Japan) Miyu Ozeki
- (Japan) Manami Sunaga
- (Japan) Mariko Tanaka
- (Jordan) Shahnaz Jebreen
- (Jordan) Stephanie Al-Naber
- (Laos) Phonethip Sengmany
- (Laos) Suphavanh Phayvanh
- (Myanmar) Khin Marlar Tun
- (Myanmar) Khin Than Wai
- (Myanmar) Margret Marri
- (Myanmar) Moe Moe War
- (Philippines) Natasha Alquiros
- (Philippines) Chalise Baysa
- (Philippines) Heather Cooke
- (Philippines) Patrice Impelido
- (Philippines) Marisa Park
- (Philippines) Sunshine Soriano
- (Philippines) Camille Wilson
- (Thailand) Alisa Rukpinij
- (Thailand) Rattikan Thongsombut
- (Vietnam) Nguyễn Thị Muôn
- (Vietnam) Nguyễn Thị Ngọc Anh
- (Vietnam) Trần Thị Kim Hồng

== Final ranking ==
Pos	Team	Pld	W	D	L	GF	GA	GD	Pts	Final result
1	Japan U23	6	5	1	0	22	4	+18	16	Champions
2	Australia U20	6	4	2	0	12	5	+7	14	Runners-up
3	Vietnam	6	3	2	1	9	3	+6	11	Third place
4	Myanmar (H)	6	3	0	3	16	9	+7	9	Fourth place
5	Thailand	4	2	1	1	12	3	+9	7	Eliminated in group stage
6	Philippines	4	2	0	2	15	11	+4	6	Eliminated in group stage
7	Jordan	4	1	0	3	2	13	−11	3	Eliminated in group stage
8	Laos	4	1	0	3	5	17	−12	3	Eliminated in group stage
9	Malaysia	4	0	0	4	0	9	−9	0	Eliminated in group stage
10	Indonesia	4	0	0	4	1	20	−19	0	Eliminated in group stage

(H) Hosts
