= Patrice Impelido =

Filipino footballer

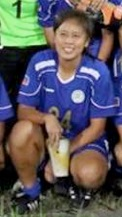

Personal information
- Full name: Patrice Mae San Pedro Impelido
- Date of birth: 9 October 1987 (age 39)
- Place of birth: Sydney, Australia
- Height: 1.65 m (5 ft 5 in)
- Position: Center back

College career
Years	Team	Apps	(Gls)
2006–2009	Western Michigan Broncos	72	(4)

Senior career*
Years	Team	Apps	(Gls)
- Sikat

International career^{‡}
2005–	Philippines	61	(4)
- * Club domestic league appearances and goals ‡ National team caps and goals as of 3 January 2014

Patrice Mae San Pedro Impelido (born October 9, 1987) is a former footballer and currently an assistant coach for the Philippines. Born in Australia, she represented the Philippines at international level.

== Early life ==
Patrice Impelido was born in Sydney, Australia on 9 October 1987. Her family has roots tracing to the Philippines and moved to Australia because of a job transfer Impelido's father received. In 1990, Impelido's family moved to the United States following another job transfer her father received. Her family settled in Glen Ellyn, Illinois.

Impelido started playing football at a young age and because of her family's connection with the sport. Patrice's sister Angeline, who is four years older than her, served as a role model to her and stated that football was one of her sister's interest. Impelido's father was also a coach and taught her the game.

== International career ==
Philippine head coach Marlon Maro invited Patrice Impelido to try out for the team and was accepted to the national team. Her older sister Angeline Impelido was already playing for the national team at that time and later played football with her during the 2005 and 2007 Southeast Asian Games. Impelido was first called up to the Philippine national team for the 2005 Southeast Asian Games where she played as a midfielder. She later played, as a scoring center back for her national team. She made her first international goal against Laos at the 2007 Southeast Asian Games in a match that ended in a 2–2 draw. She was also credited for scoring the sole goal against the Japanese U–23 team at the 2013 AFF Women's Championship which ended in a 1–4 defeat. Impelido had turns with assuming the role of team captain with Samantha Nierras.

At the 2018 AFC Women's Asian Cup, Impelido was designated as captain of the national team along with Tahnai Annis though Impelido herself has yet to play in an Asian Cup match.

== Career statistics ==
=== International goals ===
Scores and results list the Philippines' goal tally first.

#	Date	Venue	Opponent	Score	Result	Competition
1.	3 December 2007	Municipality of Tumbon Mueangpug Stadium, Nakhon Ratchasima, Thailand	Laos	1–1	2–2	2007 Southeast Asian Games
2.	17 September 2012	Thong Nhat Stadium, Ho Chi Minh City, Vietnam	Singapore	1–0	7–2	2012 AFF Women's Championship
3.	15 August 2017	UiTM Stadium, Shah Alam, Malaysia	Malaysia	1–0	2–1	2017 Southeast Asian Games
