= Nguyễn Thị Ngọc Anh =

Vietnamese footballer

Personal information
- Date of birth: 23 February 1985 (age 41)
- Place of birth: Quốc Oai, Hanoi, Vietnam
- Height: 1.70 m (5 ft 7 in)
- Position: Defender

Senior career*
Years	Team	Apps	(Gls)
2003–2018	Hà Nội I	97	(9)

International career^{‡}
2010–2017	Vietnam	17	(0)
- * Club domestic league appearances and goals ‡ National team caps and goals as of 10:08, 22 March 2015 (UTC)

Nguyễn Thị Ngọc Anh (born 23 February 1985) is a Vietnamese footballer who plays as a defender.

== International goals ==
No.	Date	Venue	Opponent	Score	Result	Competition
1.	24 May 2013	Bahrain National Stadium, Riffa, Bahrain	Kyrgyzstan	2–0	12–0	2014 AFC Women's Asian Cup qualification
2.	22 September 2013	Thuwunna Stadium, Yangon, Myanmar	Myanmar	1–0	3–1	2013 AFF Women's Championship
