= Margret Marri =

Burmese footballer

Personal information
- Full name: Margret Marri
- Place of birth: Shwebo, Myanmar
- Position: Striker

International career^{‡}
Years	Team	Apps	(Gls)
2009–	Myanmar	4	(1)
- ‡ National team caps and goals as of 09:24, 22 March 2015 (UTC)

Margret Marri is a footballer from Burma who currently plays as a forward.

== International goals ==
No.	Date	Venue	Opponent	Score	Result	Competition
1.	13 December 2009	Chao Anouvong Stadium, Vientiane, Laos	Malaysia	6–1	7–1	2009 Southeast Asuan Games
2.	23 May 2013	Faisal Al-Husseini International Stadium, Al-Ram, Palestine	Palestine	4–0	9–0	2014 AFC Women's Asian Cup qualification
3.	16 September 2013	Thuwunna Stadium, Yangon, Myanmar	Indonesia	3–0	4–0	2013 AFF Women's Championship

== See also ==
- List of Myanmar women's international footballers
