= Chalise Baysa =

Filipino footballer

Personal information
- Full name: Chalise Catayas Baysa
- Date of birth: December 30, 1980 (age 45)
- Place of birth: Honolulu, Hawaii, United States

Team information
- Current team: Salmon Bay (associate head coach)

College career
Years	Team	Apps	(Gls)
1998–2001	Oregon Ducks	75	(31)

Senior career*
Years	Team	Apps	(Gls)
2008-2013	Seattle Sounders Women		(19)

International career
2013	Philippines	3	(1)
- * Club domestic league appearances and goals

Chalise Catayas Baysa (born December 30, 1980) is a football manager and former player. She has played for the Seattle Sounders Women. Born in the United States, she represented the Philippines at international level.

== Early life ==
Baysa was born on December 30, 1980 at the Kapiolani Hospital in Honolulu, Hawaii but she spent her childhood in Japan, and later in Washington.

== Collegiate career ==
She attended the University of Oregon where she played for the Ducks soccer team. By October 2001, Baysa was already Oregon's all-time highest scorer with 60 goals.

== Club career ==
By 2008, Baysa was on her fifth season with the Seattle Sounders Women.

== International career ==
Baysa made three caps and a goal for the Philippines women's national football team at the 2013 AFF Women's Championship. She was part of the final line up of the Philippine national team that participated at the 2018 AFC Women's Asian Cup in Jordan. She was the oldest registered player in the whole tournament at age 37.

=== International goals ===
#	Date	Venue	Opponent	Score	Result	Competition
1.	September 18, 2013	Bogyoke Aung San Stadium, Yangon	Laos	6–0	7–2	2013 AFF Women's Championship

== Coaching career ==
Baysa is a holder of a USSF National "A" License.
