= Mariko Tanaka =

Japanese footballer (born 1993)

Personal information
- Date of birth: 10 January 1993 (age 33)
- Place of birth: Tokyo Prefecture, Japan
- Height: 1.71 m (5 ft 7 in)
- Position: Defender

Team information
- Current team: JEF United Chiba
- Number: 5

Senior career*
Years	Team	Apps	(Gls)
2019–	JEF United Chiba		
- * Club domestic league appearances and goals

Mariko Tanaka (born 10 January 1993) is a Japanese professional footballer who plays as a defender for WE League club JEF United Chiba Ladies.

== Club career ==
Tanaka made her WE League debut on 20 September 2021.
