= Camille Wilson =

Filipino footballer (born 1995)

Personal information
- Full name: Camille Angela Cortez-Viernes Wilson
- Date of birth: December 2, 1995 (age 30)
- Place of birth: West Covina, California, U.S.
- Height: 1.67 m (5 ft 6 in)
- Positions: Midfielder; forward

Youth career
- 2010–2014: Marin F.C.
- 2010–2014: Marin Catholic Wildcats

College career
Years	Team	Apps	(Gls)
2014–2017	San Francisco Dons	72	(6)

Senior career*
Years	Team	Apps	(Gls)
2017–	San Francisco Nighthawks		

International career^{‡}
2013–	Philippines	8	(3)
- * Club domestic league appearances and goals ‡ National team caps and goals as of September 18, 2021

Camille Angela Cortez-Viernes Wilson (born December 2, 1995) is a footballer who plays as a midfielder. Born in the United States, she represents the Philippines women's national team.

== Early life ==
Wilson was born on December 2, 1995, in the United States. Both of her parents were born in the Philippines who later emigrated to the United States. Wilson was inspired to take up football from her older brother Mark.

== Education ==
Wilson attended Marin Catholic High School in Kentfield, California. She studied at the University of San Francisco for college.

== Club career ==
=== Youth ===
Wilson started playing football at age four and joined Novato's local football house league for three years. She later joined the Novato United under-10 team at age eight. At age thirteen, Wilson joined Marin F.C. and played for the California (North) Olympic Development Program (ODP) State team for two years.

Wilson played as a midfielder for her high school team, the Marin Catholic Wildcats and as a striker for her club, Marin F.C.

== International career ==
Wilson tried out for the Philippine national team when the national side set up a recruiting camp in November 2012 and March 2013 in Southern California. Wilson was among the youngest players to try out for the team. She managed to earn a spot and made her first non-FIFA international appearance at the LA Vikings Cup for the Philippine national team. She attended subsequent training camps in Southern California and was selected to represent the Philippines in the AFC Women's Asian Cup qualifiers in Bangladesh in May 2013 which served as qualifiers for the 2015 Women's World Cup. She scored her first goal in the 2013 AFF Women's Championship vs Indonesia at the 51st minute, Malditas won the game, 6–0. Wilson was in the reserve pool of the PWNT during AFC Women's Asian Cup hosted by India in January–February 2022. The Malditas earned their very first berth to FIFA World Cup 2023 following their successful run during the tournament placing third place, together with Japan, overall.

== Career statistics ==
=== International goals ===
Scores and results list the Philippines' goal tally first.

#	Date	Venue	Opponent	Score	Result	Competition
1.	10 September 2013	Thuwunna Stadium, Yangon, Myanmar	Indonesia	3–0	6–0	2013 AFF Women's Championship
2.	30 July 2016	Mandalarthiri Stadium, Mandalay, Myanmar	Singapore	2–0	2–0	2016 AFF Women's Championship
3.	18 September 2021	JAR Stadium, Tashkent, Uzbekistan	Nepal	2–1	2–1	2022 AFC Women's Asian Cup qualification
