= Marisa Park =

Filipino footballer

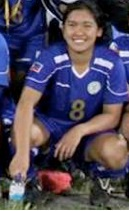
- Park in 2013

Personal information
- Full name: Maria Luisa de Vera Park
- Date of birth: 25 August 1991 (age 35)
- Place of birth: Alexandria, Virginia, United States
- Height: 5 ft 3 in (1.60 m)
- Position: Midfielder

Youth career
- 2007–2008: Reston FC

College career
Years	Team	Apps	(Gls)
2009–2012	Wake Forest Demon Deacons	89	(8)

Senior career*
Years	Team	Apps	(Gls)
2014	Braddock Road Stars Elite	12	(6)
2015	IL Sandviken		

International career^{‡}
2013–	Philippines	5	(3)
- * Club domestic league appearances and goals ‡ National team caps and goals as of January 3, 2014

Maria Luisa de Vera Park (born 25 August 1991) is a professional international footballer who plays as a midfielder. Born in the United States, she represents the Philippines at international level.

== Early life and education ==
Park was born in Alexandria, Virginia on August 25, 1991, to Randy and Mavee Park. She studied at Langley High School and later at the Wake Forest University where she graduated in May 2013 with a degree in business and enterprise management.

== Career ==
=== Youth and college ===
Park played for Reston FC. She also played for her varsity team, the Wake Forest Demon Deacons from 2009 to 2013. She has the fourth-most appearance in the history of Wake Forest's program, appearing 89 times for the team. Park scored eight goals, 10 assists and 26 points in her Wake Forest Career. She was also part of the Demon Deacons team that won its first ACC Championship in 2010 and was named as part of the 2010 ACC All-Tournament Team.

=== Senior club ===
Marisa Park plays for the Braddock Road Stars Elite as a midfielder and captain of the team. Park scored the first goal in the whole history of Braddock on their match against the Washington Spirit Reserves which the team lost with the scoreline 4–1. Park received an honorable mention for the first week of the 2014 W-League season. In 2015, she transferred to Norwegian club, IL Sandviken which plays at the Toppserien.

== International career ==
Park who was then a senior student at Wake Forest, was called up to the Philippines women's national team for the qualification phase of the 2014 AFC Women's Asian Cup which was held in 2013. Park made her FIFA International debut against Thailand and also became the first Demon Deacon to be called up to a senior women's national team for a competitive match.

Park previously played for the Philippine national team competing against football clubs at the LA Vikings Cup which was held in November 2012. She was named part of the squad that participated at the 2018 AFC Women's Asian Cup.

=== International goals ===
Scores and results list the Philippines' goal tally first.

#	Date	Venue	Opponent	Score	Result	Competition
1.	25 May 2013	Bangabandhu National Stadium, Dhaka, Bangladesh	Bangladesh	1–0	4–0	2014 AFC Women's Asian Cup Qualifier
2.	25 May 2013	Bangabandhu National Stadium, Dhaka, Bangladesh	Bangladesh	4–0	4–0	2014 AFC Women's Asian Cup Qualifier
3.	10 September 2013	Thuwunna Stadium, Yangon	Indonesia	6–0	6–0	2013 AFF Women's Championship

== Other career ==
Marisa Park works for Berkeley Research Group in the Washington DC office where her work focuses on the healthcare industry.
