= Natasha Alquiros =

Filipino footballer (born 1991)

Natasha Alquiros-Deyto
Personal information
- Full name: Natasha Claudine Alquiros Deyto
- Date of birth: 17 January 1991 (age 35)
- Place of birth: Quezon City, Philippines
- Position: Midfielder

College career
Years	Team	Apps	(Gls)
- De La Salle University

Senior career*
Years	Team	Apps	(Gls)
–2015	Green Archers United		
2015	Sikat		
2016	Hiraya		
2024	Stallion Laguna		(1)

International career
2007–?	Philippines	+12	(1)
- * Club domestic league appearances and goals

Natasha Claudine Alquiros Deyto is a Filipino former international footballer who last played as a midfielder for Stallion Laguna. She played for the Philippines internationally. Alquiros has played for women's team of Green Archers United at the club level. She also works as a host at TV5.

In 2016, Alquiros joined Hiraya F.C. which participated in the inaugural season of the PFF Women's League.

== Career statistics ==
=== International goals ===
Scores and results list the Philippines' goal tally first.

#	Date	Venue	Opponent	Score	Result	Competition
1.	18 September 2013	Bogyoke Aung San Stadium, Yangon	Laos	5–0	7–2	2013 AFF Women's Championship
