= Taneekarn Dangda =

Thai footballer (born 1992)

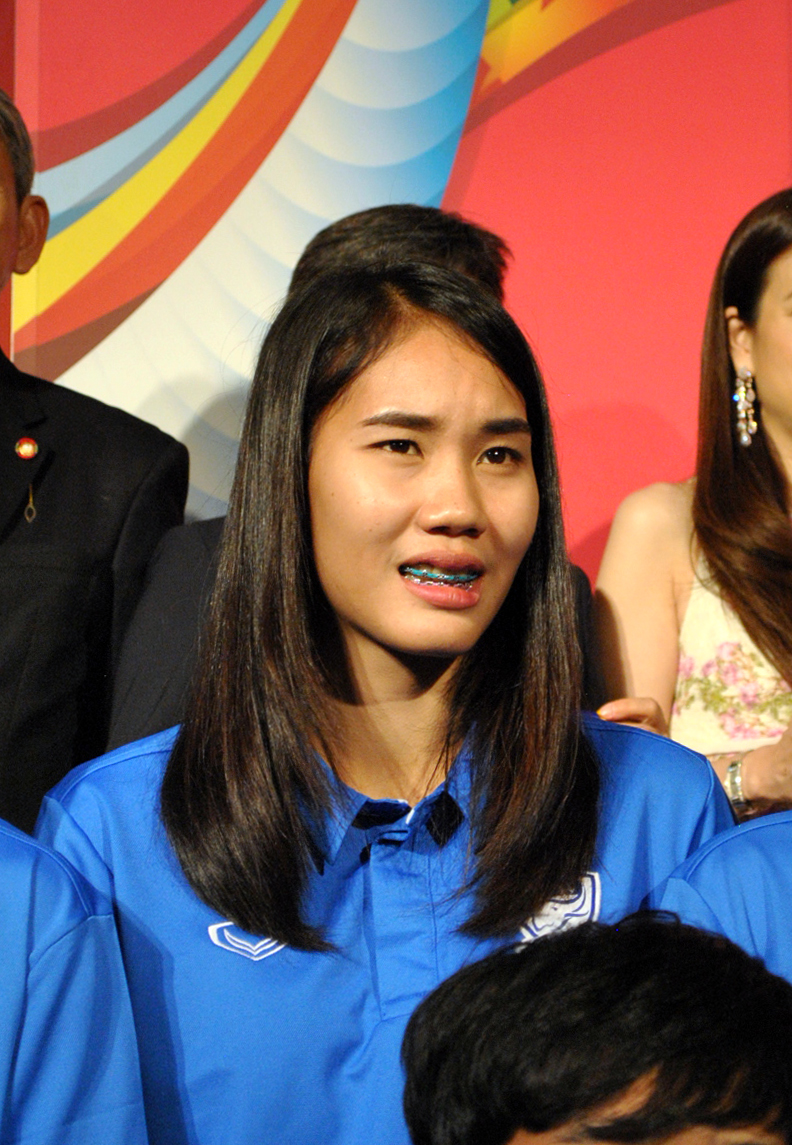
- Dangda in March 2015

Personal information
- Full name: Taneekarn Dangda
- Date of birth: 15 December 1992 (age 33)
- Place of birth: Bangkok, Thailand
- Height: 1.73 m (5 ft 8 in)
- Position: Forward

Team information
- Current team: BG Bundit Asia
- Number: 11

Senior career*
| Years | Team | Apps | (Gls) |
| 2013–2014 | Bangkok | 30 | (11) |
| 2014–2016 | Östersunds DFF | 20 | (5) |
| 2016–2019 | Chonburi | 16 | (5) |
| 2019–2019 | Yunnan Jiashijing | 18 | (7) |
| 2020–2023 | Chonburi | 5 | (1) |
| 2023–2025 | AC Nagano Parceiro | 16 | (1) |
| 2026– | BG Bundit Asia | 0 | (0) |

International career^{‡}
| 2012– | Thailand | 71 | (26) |
- * Club domestic league appearances and goals as of 23 March 2025 ‡ National team caps and goals as of 13:40, 13 June 2019 (UTC)

Taneekarn Dangda (Thai: ธนีกาญจน์ แดงดา; born 15 December 1992) is a Thai international women's association footballer playing as a forward for BG Bundit Asia.

== Personal life ==
Taneekarn was born in Bangkok but her parents are from Surin province of Northeastern Thailand. Her brother, Teerasil Dangda, is a member of the Thailand national football team and also plays as a striker; their father was also a footballer and played for Royal Thai Air Force.

== Career statistics ==
=== International ===
==== International goals ====
| No. | Date | Venue | Opponent | Score | Result | Competition |
|---|---|---|---|---|---|---|
| 1. | 10 June 2011 | Amman International Stadium, Amman, Jordan | Jordan | 5–0 | 7–1 | 2012 Summer Olympics Qualifiers |
| 2. | 3 September 2011 | Jinan Olympic Sports Center, Jinan, China | Australia | 1–5 | 1–5 | 2012 Summer Olympics Qualifiers |
| 3. | 17 October 2011 | New Laos National Stadium, Vientiane, Laos | Malaysia | 7–0 | 8–1 | 2011 AFF Women's Championship |
| 4. | 18 September 2012 | Thong Nhat Stadium, Ho Chi Minh City, Vietnam | Laos | 2–0 | 3–0 | 2012 AFF Women's Championship |
| 5. | 22 September 2012 | Thong Nhat Stadium, Ho Chi Minh City, Vietnam | Laos | 12–1 | 14–1 | 2012 AFF Women's Championship |
| 6. | 22 September 2012 | Thong Nhat Stadium, Ho Chi Minh City, Vietnam | Laos | 13–1 | 14–1 | 2012 AFF Women's Championship |
| 7. | 17 September 2013 | Aung San Stadium, Yangon, Myanmar | Malaysia | 3–0 | 6–0 | 2013 AFF Women's Championship |
| 8. | 16 December 2013 | Mandalarthiri Stadium, Mandalay, Myanmar | Laos | 5–0 | 5–0 | 2013 Southeast Asian Games |
| 9. | 12 March 2015 | Leo Stadium, Pathum Thani, Thailand | Papua New Guinea | 1–0 | 11–1 | Friendly |
| 10. | 12 March 2015 | Leo Stadium, Pathum Thani, Thailand | Papua New Guinea | 2–0 | 11–1 | Friendly |
| 11. | 12 March 2015 | Leo Stadium, Pathum Thani, Thailand | Papua New Guinea | 3–0 | 11–1 | Friendly |
| 12. | 12 March 2015 | Leo Stadium, Pathum Thani, Thailand | Papua New Guinea | 10–1 | 11–1 | Friendly |
| 13. | 12 March 2015 | Leo Stadium, Pathum Thani, Thailand | Papua New Guinea | 11–1 | 11–1 | Friendly |
| 14. | 14 March 2015 | Supachalasai Stadium, Bangkok, Thailand | Papua New Guinea | 1–0 | 7–0 | Friendly |
| 15. | 14 March 2015 | Supachalasai Stadium, Bangkok, Thailand | Papua New Guinea | 4–0 | 7–0 | Friendly |
| 16. | 5 May 2015 | Thống Nhất Stadium, Ho Chi Minh City, Vietnam | Laos | 11–0 | 12–0 | 2015 AFF Women's Championship |
| 17. | 28 July 2016 | Mandalarthiri Stadium, Mandalay, Myanmar | Singapore | 5–0 | 8–0 | 2016 AFF Women's Championship |
| 18. | 24 January 2017 | Century Lotus Stadium, Foshan, China | Myanmar | 3–0 | 3–0 | 2017 Four Nations Tournament |
| 19. | 3 April 2017 | Faisal Al-Husseini International Stadium, Al-Ram, Palestine | Palestine | 0–3 | 0–6 | 2018 AFC Women's Asian Cup qualification |
| 20. | 10 June 2017 | PAT Stadium, Bangkok, Thailand | Chinese Taipei | 1–1 | 4–1 | Friendly |
| 21. | 20 August 2017 | UiTM Stadium, Shah Alam, Malaysia | Malaysia | 6–0 | 6–0 | 2017 Southeast Asian Games |
| 22. | 23 January 2018 | Century Lotus Stadium, Foshan, China | Vietnam | 2–0 | 2–0 | 2018 Four Nations Tournament |
| 23. | 9 April 2018 | King Abdullah II Stadium, Amman, Jordan | Jordan | 2–0 | 6–1 | 2018 AFC Women's Asian Cup |
| 24. | 27 May 2018 | Gelora Sriwijaya Stadium, Palembang, Indonesia | Indonesia | 1–0 | 13–0 | Friendly |
| 25. | 27 May 2018 | Gelora Sriwijaya Stadium, Palembang, Indonesia | Indonesia | 5–0 | 13–0 | Friendly |
| 26. | 27 May 2018 | Gelora Sriwijaya Stadium, Palembang, Indonesia | Indonesia | 8–0 | 13–0 | Friendly |
| 27. | 1 March 2019 | GSZ Stadium, Larnaca, Cyprus | Mexico | 1–1 | 1–2 | 2019 Cyprus Women's Cup |
| 28. | 4 March 2019 | AEK Arena, Larnaca, Cyprus | Italy | 1–3 | 1–4 | 2019 Cyprus Women's Cup |
| 29. | 26 November 2019 | Biñan Football Stadium, Biñan, Philippines | Vietnam | 1–1 | 1–1 | 2019 Southeast Asian Games |
| 30. | 15 May 2022 | Cẩm Phả Stadium, Cẩm Phả, Vietnam | Laos | 2–0 | 5–0 | 2021 Southeast Asian Games |
| 31. | 15 May 2022 | Cẩm Phả Stadium, Cẩm Phả, Vietnam | Laos | 4–0 | 5–0 | 2021 Southeast Asian Games |
| 32. | 15 May 2022 | Cẩm Phả Stadium, Cẩm Phả, Vietnam | Laos | 5–0 | 5–0 | 2021 Southeast Asian Games |
| 33. | 18 May 2022 | Cẩm Phả Stadium, Cẩm Phả, Vietnam | Philippines | 2–0 | 3–0 | 2021 Southeast Asian Games |

== Honours ==
=== International ===
Thailand

- AFC Women's Championship Fifth Place: 2014
- AFF Women's Championship: 2011, 2015
- Southeast Asian Games Gold Medal: 2013
