= Moe Moe War =

Burmese footballer

Personal information
- Date of birth: 21 September 1984 (age 42)
- Place of birth: Mawlamyine, Myanmar
- Position: Defender

International career^{‡}
Years	Team	Apps	(Gls)
2009–2014	Myanmar	11	(0)
- ‡ National team caps and goals as of 19 May 2014

Moe Moe War (Burmese: မိုးမိုးဝါ; born 21 September 1984) is a Burmese former footballer who played as a defender. She has been a member of the Myanmar women's national team.

== International career ==
Moe Moe War capped for Myanmar at senior level in three AFC Women's Asian Cup editions (2008, 2010 and 2014).
