= Japan women's national under-23 football team =

Women's national association football team representing Japan

Japan
- Nickname: Olympic Nadeshiko
- Association: JFA
- Confederation: AFC
- Sub-confederation: EAFF
First colours	Second colours

The Japan women's national under-23 football team (Japanese: U-23サッカー日本女子代表) is a national association football youth team of Japan and is controlled by the Japan Football Association.

== Results and fixtures ==
Legend

Win Draw Loss Fixture

== Coaching staff ==
=== Current coaching staff ===
As of 2 March 2017

Role	Name
Coach	Futoshi Ikeda

=== Manager history ===
Name	Period	Matches	Wins	Draws	Losses	Winning %	Notes	Ref.
Asako Takakura (高倉麻子)	2016	3	1	1	1	33.33%		
Futoshi Ikeda (池田 太)	2017	3	1	1	1	33.33%		

== Competitive record ==
=== La Manga International Women's U-23 Tournament ===
(Spain) La Manga International Women's U-23 Tournament record
Year	Result	Position	Pld	W	D	L	GF	GA
2014			3	2	0	1	6	2
2015			3	1	0	2	3	4
2016	Champions	1st	3	3	0	0	7	0
2017			3	1	1	1	5	5
Total	0/0	0 titles	12	7	1	4	21	11

=== AFF Women's Championship ===
AFF Women's Championship record
Year	Result	Position	Pld	W	D	L	GF	GA
Invitee
(Myanmar) 2013	Champions	1st	6	5	1	0	22	4
Total	1/12	1 title	6	5	1	0	22	4

== See also ==
- Women's football in Japan
- Japan women's national football team
- Japan women's national under-20 football team
- Japan women's national under-17 football team
