= Samantha Nierras =

Filipino international footballer (born 1989)

Personal information
- Full name: Samantha Camille Dacanay Nierras
- Date of birth: 16 July 1989 (age 37)
- Place of birth: Fremont, California, U.S.
- Height: 1.57 m (5 ft 2 in)
- Position: Midfielder

College career
Years	Team	Apps	(Gls)
- La Salle Lady Booters

International career^{‡}
2003/4?–2013	Philippines	46	(3)
- ‡ National team caps and goals as of January 3, 2014

Samantha Camille Dacanay Nierras is a Filipino international footballer.

== Early life ==
Nierras was born on July 16, 1989, in Fremont, California. She was raised in California and later moved to the Philippines in 1999.

== Youth career ==
She was first involved in football at the age of 8, when she joined kiddie soccer tournaments sponsored by Milpitas' City Police Department.

Samantha Nierras played for the La Salle Lady Booters varsity team as a football player. She played at midfield position. Nierras was named MVP of the UAAP Season 72 when she led her team to the championships as team captain.

== International career ==
Nierras first played at the international level at age 14 for the under-19 team. Months later she made her international debut for the senior team. She was the team captain at the 2014 AFC Women's Asian Cup qualifiers and 2013 Southeast Asian Games

== Career statistics ==
=== International goals ===
Scores and results list the Philippines' goal tally first.

#	Date	Venue	Opponent	Score	Result	Competition
1.	19 October 2011	New Laos National Stadium, Vientiane	Thailand	1–5	1–5	2011 AFF Women's Championship
2.	21 October 2011	New Laos National Stadium, Vientiane	Malaysia	2–2	2–2	2011 AFF Women's Championship
3.	17 September 2012	Thong Nhat Stadium, Ho Chi Minh City	Singapore	6–1	7–2	2012 AFF Women's Championship

== Personal life ==
Samantha Nierras' father, Ernie Nierras, is a football coach and the former head coach of the Philippine women's national team. Her involvement in the national team prompted her father's to take the job as one of the two team manager of the team under head coach Marlon Maro. Samantha credits her family for introducing the sport of football.
