= Miyuki Takahashi (footballer) =

Japanese footballer

Personal information
- Date of birth: 7 October 1993 (age 33)
- Place of birth: Fukuoka Prefecture, Japan
- Height: 1.62 m (5 ft 4 in)
- Position: Forward

Team information
- Current team: Chifure AS Elfen Saitama
- Number: 11

Senior career*
Years	Team	Apps	(Gls)
2021–2023	Omiya Ardija Ventus		
2023–2025	Sanfrecce Hiroshima Regina		
2025–	Chifure AS Elfen Saitama		
- * Club domestic league appearances and goals

Miyuki Takahashi (Japanese: 高橋美夕紀; born 7 October 1993) is a Japanese professional footballer who plays as a forward for WE League club Chifure AS Elfen Saitama.

== Club career ==
Takahashi made her WE League debut on 12 September 2021.
