= Wilaiporn Boothduang =

Thai footballer (born 1987)

Personal information
- Full name: Wilaiporn Boothduang
- Date of birth: 25 June 1987 (age 39)
- Place of birth: Udon Thani, Thailand
- Height: 1.57 m (5 ft 2 in)
- Position: Midfielder

International career^{‡}
Years	Team	Apps	(Gls)
2009–	Thailand	102	(28)
- ‡ National team caps and goals as of 4 February 2022

Wilaiporn Boothduang (Thai: วิลัยพร บุตรด้วง born 25 June 1987) is a Thai international footballer who plays as a midfielder.

== International goals ==
No.	Date	Venue	Opponent	Score	Result	Competition
1.	10 June 2011	Amman International Stadium, Amman, Jordan	Jordan	1–0	7–0	2012 Summer Olympics qualification
2.	12 June 2011	King Abdullah Stadium, Amman, Jordan	Vietnam	3–3	3–3	2012 Summer Olympics qualification
3.	17 September 2013	Bogyoke Aung San Stadium, Yangon, Myanmar	Malaysia	1–0	6–0	2013 AFF Women's Championship
4.	17 September 2014	Incheon Namdong Asiad Rugby Field, Incheon, South Korea	Maldives	3–0	10–0	2014 Asian Games
5.	3 May 2015	Thống Nhất Stadium, Hồ Chí Minh City, Vietnam	Indonesia	7–0	10–1	2015 AFF Women's Championship
6.	5 May 2015	Thống Nhất Stadium, Hồ Chí Minh City, Vietnam	Laos	6–0	12–0	2015 AFF Women's Championship
7.	27 May 2018	Gelora Sriwijaya Stadium, Palembang, Indonesia	Indonesia	7–0	13–0	Friendly
8.	17 August 2019	IPE Chonburi Campus Stadium, Chonburi, Thailand	Singapore	1–0	8–0	2019 AFF Women's Championship
9.	17 August 2019	IPE Chonburi Campus Stadium, Chonburi, Thailand	Singapore	4–0	8–0	2019 AFF Women's Championship
10.	17 August 2019	IPE Chonburi Campus Stadium, Chonburi, Thailand	Singapore	8–0	8–0	2019 AFF Women's Championship
11.	21 August 2019	IPE Chonburi Campus Stadium, Chonburi, Thailand	Philippines	4–2	4–2	2019 AFF Women's Championship
