= Joana Houplin =

Filipino-American soccer player

Joana Michaelson
Personal information
- Full name: Joana Vaya Malinao Michaelson
- Date of birth: 12 February 1990 (age 36)
- Place of birth: Koronadal, Philippines
- Height: 5 ft 4 in (1.63 m)
- Positions: Midfielder; forward

College career
Years	Team	Apps	(Gls)
2008–2012	Western Washington Vikings	73	(12)

Senior career*
Years	Team	Apps	(Gls)
2012–2015	Issaquah Gunners		
2012–2014	Seattle Reign FC (reserve team)		
2014	Seattle Sounders Women		

International career^{‡}
2013–2015	Philippines	11	(12)
- * Club domestic league appearances and goals ‡ National team caps and goals as of May 1, 2015

Joana Vaya Malinao Michaelson (born 12 February 1990), née Houplin, is a Filipino-American association football coach and former international footballer who played as a midfielder for Seattle Sounders Women. Houplin was also the top scorer at the 2013 AFF Women's Championship scoring 8 goals.

== Early life and education ==
Joana Houplin was born in the Philippines on February 12, 1990. She has both Philippine and United States citizenship. Houplin later moved to England at age 4 and later to the United States at 12.

She attended the Olympia High School and also the Western Washington University where she obtained a bachelor's degree in kinesiology in 2012. She pursued graduate studies in sports science in the same university.

== Competitive career ==
=== High school ===
Houplin played soccer for Olympia High School. On her senior year she was named part of the first-team Class 4A all-state selection. She was also named the Tacoma News Tribune all-Area and Narrows League MVP and The Olympian Area MVP for her stint with her high school.

=== Collegiate ===
Houplin played for the Western Washington Vikings, the soccer team of her college from 2008 to 2012. As a senior in 2012 she was named part of the second-team National Soccer Coaches Association of America West Region all-star selection. She led team in a Far West Regional final and won both the Great Northwest Athletic Conference regular-season and tournament titles. In her four-year stint with her college's team, she scored 12 goals and made 11 assists for 35 points.

=== Club ===
She played as part of the reserves team of Seattle Reign FC from 2013 to 2015. Simultaneously, she played for the Issaquah Gunners of the Women's Premier Soccer League from 2012 to 2015. In 2014, she was part of the Seattle Sounders Women.

=== International ===
In late-March 2013, she took part in a week long training camp by the Philippines national football team in Corona, California which led to her selection as part of the squad that will later participate at the 2014 AFC Women's Asian Cup qualifiers. She last played for the Philippines in 2015.

International goals
Scores and results list the Philippines' goal tally first.

#	Date	Venue	Opponent	Score	Result	Competition
1.	21 May 2013	Bangabandhu National Stadium, Dhaka, Bangladesh	Iran	5–0	6–0	2014 AFC Women's Asian Cup qualification
2.	10 September 2013	Thuwunna Stadium, Yangon, Myanmar	Indonesia	1–0	6–0	2013 AFF Women's Championship
3.	10 September 2013	Thuwunna Stadium, Yangon, Myanmar	Indonesia	2–0	6–0	2013 AFF Women's Championship
4.	10 September 2013	Thuwunna Stadium, Yangon, Myanmar	Indonesia	4–0	6–0	2013 AFF Women's Championship
5.	14 September 2013	Thuwunna Stadium, Yangon, Myanmar	Myanmar	1–5	1–5	2013 AFF Women's Championship
6.	18 September 2013	Aung San Stadium, Yangon, Myanmar	Laos	1–0	7–2	2013 AFF Women's Championship
7.	18 September 2013	Aung San Stadium, Yangon, Myanmar	Laos	2–0	7–2	2013 AFF Women's Championship
8.	18 September 2013	Aung San Stadium, Yangon, Myanmar	Laos	3–0	7–2	2013 AFF Women's Championship
9.	18 September 2013	Aung San Stadium, Yangon, Myanmar	Laos	4–0	7–2	2013 AFF Women's Championship
10.	2 May 2015	Thống Nhất Stadium, Ho Chi Minh City, Vietnam	Malaysia	2–0	3–0	2015 AFF Women's Championship
11.	2 May 2015	Thống Nhất Stadium, Ho Chi Minh City, Vietnam	Malaysia	3–0	3–0	2015 AFF Women's Championship
12.	4 May 2015	Thống Nhất Stadium, Ho Chi Minh City, Vietnam	Myanmar	1–0	1–4	2015 AFF Women's Championship

== Coaching career ==
Since 2014, she is the head coach of Northwest United FC. She is a holder of at least a USSF National "D" License. Houplin is also involved with the women's soccer team of the Western Washington University, her alma mater, as a volunteer assistant coach
