= Inna Palacios =

Filipino footballer (born 1994)

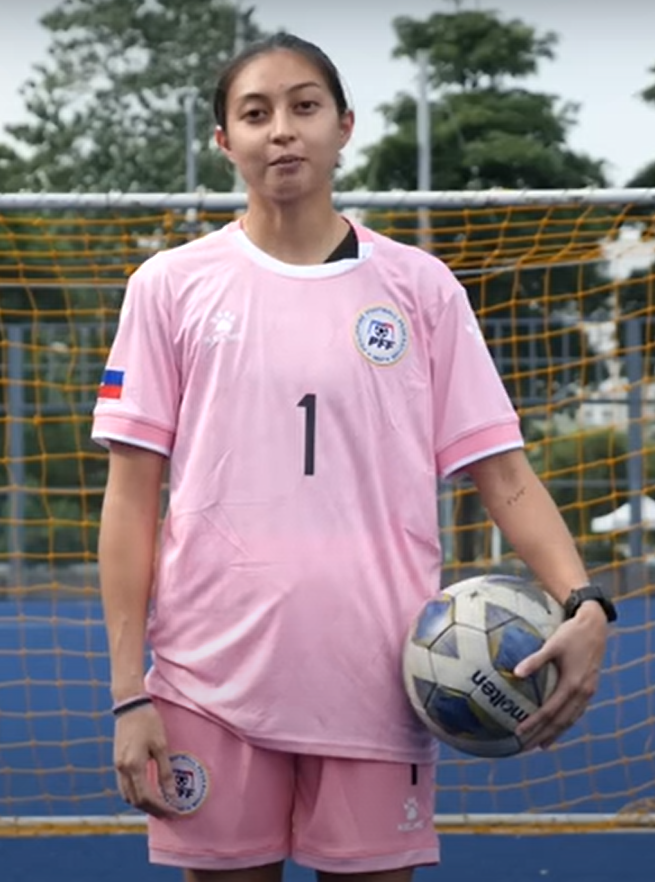
- Palacios with the Philippines women's national football team in 2022

Personal information
- Full name: Inna Kristianne Beza Palacios
- Date of birth: February 8, 1994 (age 32)
- Place of birth: Manila, Philippines
- Height: 1.70 m (5 ft 7 in)
- Position: Goalkeeper

Team information
- Current team: Kaya-Iloilo
- Number: 1

Youth career
- 2004–2012: Colegio San Agustin – Makati

College career
Years	Team	Apps	(Gls)
2013–2017	De La Salle University		(1)

Senior career*
Years	Team	Apps	(Gls)
2021–	Kaya-Iloilo		

International career
2013	Philippines U19		
2012–2025	Philippines	51	(0)
Medal record
Women's football
Representing the Philippines
ASEAN Women's Championship
Winner	2022 Philippines	Team
Southeast Asian Games
Gold medal – first place	2025 Thailand	Team
Bronze medal – third place	2021 Vietnam	Team
- * Club domestic league appearances and goals

Inna Kristianne Beza Palacios (born February 8, 1994) is a Filipino professional footballer who plays as a goalkeeper for PFF Women's League club Kaya-Iloilo. She also played for the Philippines women's national team.

== Early life ==
Inna Palacios was born on February 8, 1994, in Manila, Philippines. She started playing football at age 4.

== Career ==
=== Youth ===
Palacios attended Colegio San Agustin – Makati and won at least 5 MVP awards and some tournaments with her school's football team. She started playing for her school's team at grade 4. Before playing as a goalkeeper, she tried playing as a forward, winger and a defender.

=== Collegiate ===
Palacios decided to study at De La Salle University and play for their varsity team. She was scouted by La Salle coach, Hans Smit, during her stint with the national team in 2012. She was also scouted by the coaches of the Ateneo de Manila University and University of the Philippines.

In her rookie year with De La Salle, Palacios dealt with several issues that led her to almost quit football: the death of her grandmother while she was away from the country while playing for the Philippine national team and recovering from a recurring injury. Smit allowed Palacios to recover physically and emotionally and was able to regain her form. Inna Palacios established herself as the first-choice goalkeeper of her varsity team and was able to receive the best goalkeeper award at UAAP Season 75 and UAAP Season 77 which ended in 2013 and 2015 respectively. She scored a goal in her final game for De La Salle.

=== Club ===
La Salle played alongside clubs and other collegiate teams at the PFF Women's League. Palacios was part of the team which won the 2016–17 season. She was named Best Goalkeeper for the season.

Palacios has been with Kaya–Iloilo as early as 2021. She helped the club win the 2022 SingaCup in Singapore. Kaya won the PFF Women's League in 2023 and 2025 seasons.

=== International ===
In 2007, at age 13, Palacios was called up to play for the Philippine under-16 national team. She was later called up to join the senior national team as part of the reserves that played in a friendly tournament in Hong Kong and also participated in the 2012 AFF Women's Championship. She also played for the under-19 national team at the 2013 AFC U-19 Women's Championship qualification.

Palacios is a consistent member of the senior national team. She helped the Philippines qualify for the 2019 AFC Asian Cup ,which included a crucial 1–1 draw with Bahrain, but did not feature in any match in the continental tournament itself because Rabah Benlarbi, who was hired to lead the national team for just the tournament, preferred to field a newcomer instead. She played again for the national team in the 2020 Summer Olympics Asian qualifiers, where the Philippines managed to progress from the first round.

Palacios earned her 50th international cap at the 2022 AFF Women's Championship in the Philippines' match against Singapore. Her last and 51st cap was against Indonesia in the same tournament.

Nevertheless, Palacios remained part of the national team for three more years. She was included as part of the Philippine roster for the 2025 SEA Games in Thailand. Palacios announced that she would be retiring from the national team shortly prior to the final. The Philippines went on to win their first ever gold medal in football.

== Honors ==
=== International ===
==== Philippines ====
- Southeast Asian Games first place: 2025
- Southeast Asian Games third place: 2021
- ASEAN Women's Championship: 2022

=== Club ===
==== De La Salle ====
- PFF Women's League: 2016–17

==== Kaya–Iloilo ====
- PFF Women's League: 2023, 2025
