= Heather Cooke =

Filipino footballer

Personal information
- Full name: Heather Marie Diosano Cooke
- Date of birth: 25 December 1988 (age 37)
- Place of birth: California, Maryland, U.S.
- Height: 1.73 m (5 ft 8 in)
- Positions: Defender; striker

College career
Years	Team	Apps	(Gls)
2006–2009	Loyola Greyhounds	82	(4)

Senior career*
Years	Team	Apps	(Gls)
2014	Landsbro IF		

International career
2011–	Philippines		(7)
- * Club domestic league appearances and goals

Heather Marie Diosano Cooke (born 25 December 1988) is a footballer and reality television series participant. She plays as a defender and a striker. Born in the United States, she has been a member of the Philippines women's national team. She was drafted to play for Landsboro IF of the Swedish Women's Football League System. In 2011, she appeared on the MTV reality series The Real World: Las Vegas, and later appeared on The Challenge: Rivals II in 2013.

== Early life ==
Cooke's mother, Elsie, was born in the Philippines and emigrated to the United States at the age of 21. In 2010, she graduated from Loyola University Maryland.

== Club career ==
In 2013 she was drafted by the Washington Spirit in the NWSL Supplemental Draft. Cooke later joined Swedish third-tier club Landsbro IF in April 2014, and captained the side to a last-place finish in the 2014 season.

== International goals ==
Scores and results list the Philippines' goal tally first.

#	Date	Venue	Opponent	Score	Result	Competition
1.	15 September 2012	Thong Nhat Stadium, Ho Chi Minh City, Vietnam	Vietnam	1–2	2–4	2012 AFF Women's Championship
2.	15 September 2012	Thong Nhat Stadium, Ho Chi Minh City, Vietnam	Vietnam	2–4	2–4	2012 AFF Women's Championship
3.	17 September 2012	Thong Nhat Stadium, Ho Chi Minh City, Vietnam	Singapore	2–0	7–2	2012 AFF Women's Championship
4.	17 September 2012	Thong Nhat Stadium, Ho Chi Minh City, Vietnam	Singapore	3–0	7–2	2012 AFF Women's Championship
5.	17 September 2012	Thong Nhat Stadium, Ho Chi Minh City, Vietnam	Singapore	4–0	7–2	2012 AFF Women's Championship
6.	21 May 2013	Bangabandhu National Stadium, Dhaka, Bangladesh	Iran	1–0	6–0	2014 AFC Women's Asian Cup qualification
7.	10 September 2013	Thuwunna Stadium, Yangon, Myanmar	Indonesia	5–0	6–0	2013 AFF Women's Championship

== Reality television ==
In 2011, Cooke appeared on The Real World: Las Vegas and in 2013, she appeared on The Challenge: Rivals II.
