= Marice Magdolot =

Filipino footballer

Personal information
- Full name: Marice N. Magdolot
- Date of birth: July 31, 1993 (age 33)
- Place of birth: Davao City, Philippines
- Position: Midfielder

College career
Years	Team	Apps	(Gls)
- University of Santo Tomas

International career
	Philippines		(1)

Marice N. Magdolot is a Filipino international football player who plays as a midfielder. She also played as part the varsity women's football team of the University of Santo Tomas and was named MVP in UAAP Season 74.

She contributed a goal in the Philippines' 7–2 win over Singapore at the 2012 AFF Women's Championship.

== International goals ==
No.	Date	Venue	Opponent	Score	Result	Competition
1.	17 September 2012	Thống Nhất Stadium, Hồ Chí Minh City, Vietnam	Singapore	5–1	7–2	2012 AFF Women's Championship
