= A Common Year =

American indie rock band

- Origin: Indianapolis, Indiana, United States
- Genres: Alternative rock, Indie Rock
- Years active: 2009–present
- Label: Unsigned
- Members: Coleman Bright; Casey Baksa; Matthew Ritter; Jake Bergman
- Past members: Carl Smith
- Website: acommonyear.com

A Common Year are an American indie rock band from Indianapolis, Indiana, United States. The band has steadily gained notoriety since the digital release of their debut album, Between Cities, in January 2010, culminating in August when their song, "Live and Learn," aired on MTV's The Real World: New Orleans. Their song, "Distance," was featured on the TV series Degrassi in 2011 in the episode, "Mr. Brightside."

Upon its release, Between Cities received generally favorable reviews, most notably on the popular music site, AbsolutePunk. The site's review praised the album for its consistency and variety, and the strength of Baksa's vocals. Alter the Press deemed the album "a strong collection of straight-up, feel-good rock songs." The site also chose the song "A Final Word" to be included on its fall compilation album.

A Common Year released a new EP on February 7, 2012, called Where The Light Still Shines consisting of unreleased songs written after Between Cities, and recorded by the band in Indianapolis.

A Common Year are reputed as a do-it-yourself band, after writing, recording, mixing, mastering and releasing Between Cities with no financial or label support. Beyond recording, the band handles its own photography, album artwork and booking.

== Band members ==
Current line-up

- Coleman Bright - guitar, vocals
- Casey Baksa - guitar, vocals
- Matthew Ritter - bass
- Jake Bergman - drums

Past Members

- Carl Smith - bass

== Discography ==
- Between Cities (2010)
- Where The Light Still Shines - EP (2012)
