= The Real World: Las Vegas (2011 season) =

Coordinates: 36°06′36″N 115°09′13″W

- Season 25
- The original cast of The Real World: Las Vegas
- Starring: Adam Royer; Dustin Zito; Heather Marter; Leroy Garrett; Michael Ross; Nany González; Naomi Defensor; Heather Cooke
- No. of episodes: 13

Release
- Original network: MTV
- Original release: March 9 – June 8, 2011

Season chronology
- ← Previous; The Real World: New Orleans Next → The Real World: San Diego

The Real World: Las Vegas is the twenty-fifth season of MTV's reality television series The Real World, which focuses on a group of diverse strangers living together for several months in a different city each season, as cameras follow their lives and interpersonal relationships. It is the third season to be filmed in the Mountain States region of the United States, specifically in Nevada.

The season featured a total of eight cast members over the course of the season, as one cast member was evicted and replaced. It is the fifth season to take place in a city that had hosted a previous season, as the show's twelfth season was set in 2002. Las Vegas was first reported as the location for the 25th season by the website Vevmo on September 8, 2010. Pre-production started in August 2010, and filming took place from October to December 2010 at the Hard Rock Hotel and Casino. The season premiered on March 9, 2011, consisting of 13 episodes.

Director of the Nevada Film Office Charlie Geocaris commented, "The Nevada Film Office is very excited to have MTV’s The Real World return to Las Vegas. The first time here proved to be excellent exposure for the city and the NFO is always happy to assist any MTV production that visits our state."

Motocross racer Carey Hart makes a guest appearance in episode 3.

== Assignment ==
Most seasons of The Real World, beginning with its fifth season, have included the assignment of a season-long group job or task to the housemates, continued participation in which has been mandatory to remain part of the cast since the Back to New York season. In this season, the cast interns with a charity called the Athlete Recovery Fund, doing weekly assignments that included working at motorbike events.

== The residence ==
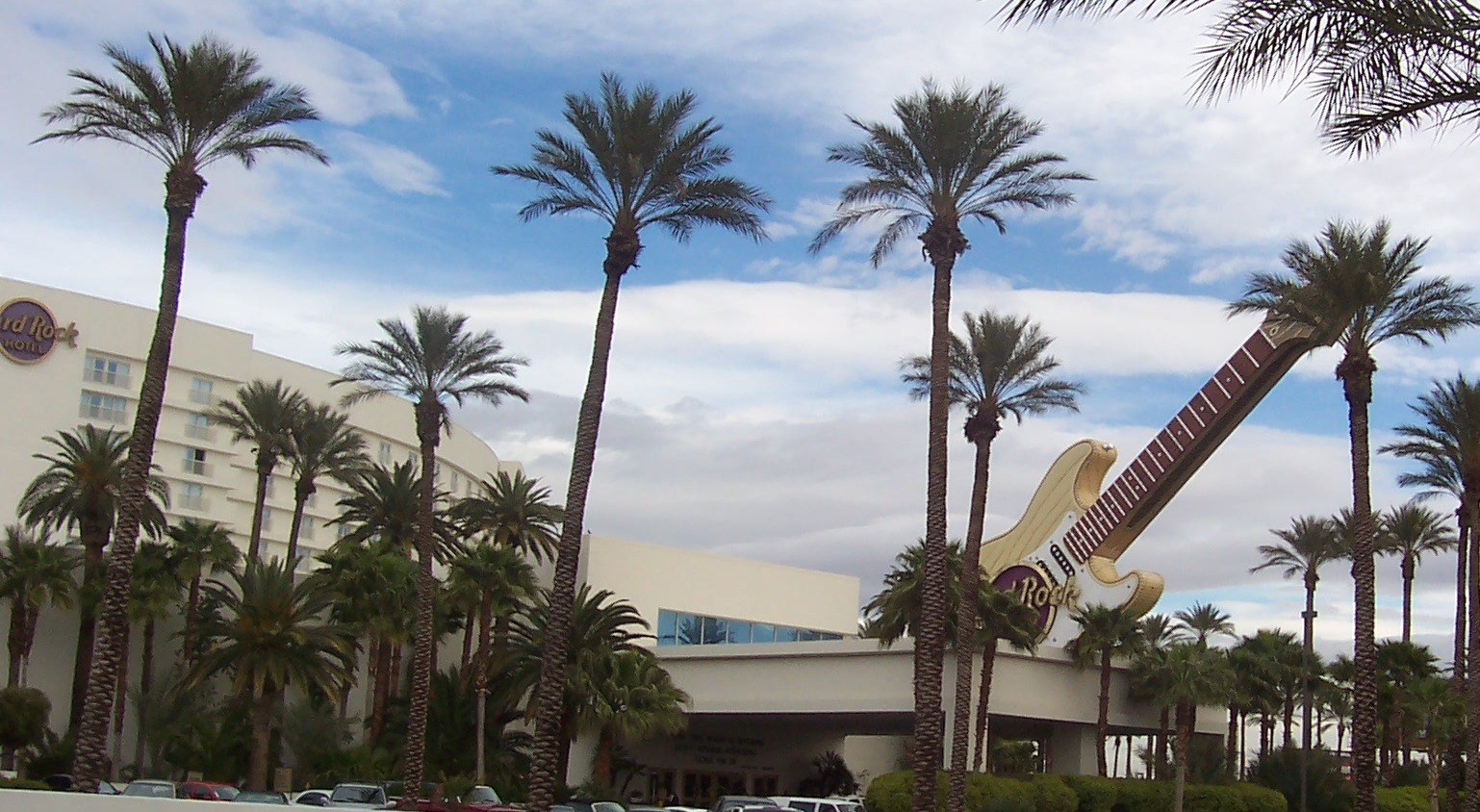
The Hard Rock Hotel and Casino in Las Vegas, where the cast resided

A custom suite was built at the Hard Rock Hotel and Casino in Las Vegas, where the cast resided. Hard Rock President and Chief Executive Officer Joseph Magliarditi commented, "We are very excited to partner with MTV and their hit reality show series The Real World for the 25th season in Las Vegas...We look forward to hosting the new cast." The penthouse suite for the cast has a large set living room, four bedrooms, and built-in bowling alley.

== Cast ==
This season, the capacity of the cast returns to a roster of seven, the first season to do so since The Real World: Hollywood.

Cast member	Age^{1}	Hometown
Adam Royer	22	Falmouth, Maine
As a child, Adam had few friends and participated in few extracurricular activities, which led to his life as a drug dealer beginning at age 14, and his arrest at 16 following a failed drug robbery that included his active participation in a shooting. While there, he petitioned the governor of Maine to let him take college classes, and established the Creek to College program that encourages residents to pursue education. He recently graduated from the University of Southern Maine, where he ran track and ran for class president and majored in criminology and political science. He is a fan of the Boston Celtics and Taylor Swift, and currently has a girlfriend, Jordan, though he exhibits an attraction to his roommate Nany, beginning in Episode 1, which comes to fruition in Episode 4. MTV described him as "focused and determined when he wants to be", but his friends characterize him as a "loose cannon" who juggles his current girlfriend with his "secret girlfriend". He is evicted from the hotel in Episode 6 after repeatedly exhibiting destructive or disorderly behavior when drunk. He returns, however, in Episode 12.
Dustin Zito	24	Rayne, Louisiana
Despite growing up in a small town, Dustin considers himself "a city boy at heart". Characterized by what MTV describes as a "boyish charm and southern gentleman demeanor", Dustin grew up with a bi-polar, drug addicted mom and an abusive stepfather. Although he was constantly shuttled between parents, relatives and various friends' houses, he worked hard to maintain relationships with his family, though his brother Quay visits in Episode 8. He worries as to whether he will develop bipolar disorder, from which his mother suffers. He once lived in the house featured on Fratpad, a live webcam site in which he and other men engage in sexual activities with one another, though he stresses that he is straight and did this purely for a living, and he hopes to put that past behind him. He further explains that his mother's Pentecostal beliefs precluded him from playing sports, and that not wanting to work in oil fields or sell drugs, he chose that line of work because of limited options. An avid fan of racing, his friends see him as a highly competitive young man whose good looks help him socialize with women. Although he initially expresses an aversion to romance with his housemates in the premiere, he later begins a romantic relationship with Heather in that same episode, but when she and the rest of the cast learn he has concealed a past, Heather breaks up with him, and the others feel betrayed.
Heather Marter	21	Delran, New Jersey
Heather grew up in a small town with a close-knit family and spent most of her adolescence living with her brother's struggle with brain cancer. Despite this, she was accepted into a gifted program in school but the neglect she felt by the constant attention paid to him led to alcoholism, and a bout of alcohol poisoning that landed her in the hospital at age 14. Though these problems have been resolved, she continues to harbor guilt over it. She is currently majoring in Communications and Information Technology at Monmouth University. where she is reportedly a member of the Delta Phi Epsilon sorority and trained in first aid and yoga. As the first in her family to attend college, she is a strong advocate for student debt education and hosts a blog dedicated to the subject.
Leroy Garrett	25	Romulus, Michigan
Leroy was 10 years old when he and his sisters were removed from their birth mother for her alcoholism and drug abuse. His foster parents were strict, but he maintains a positive outlook on life, and credits his experiences for making him self-reliant. Originally from Michigan, he has worked for the past few years as a Dallas, Texas sanitation worker, and dreams of moving to California to become an actor or personal trainer. According to MTV, his friends see him as "an open, reliable guy who doesn't judge people based on their backgrounds", and is outgoing in his attempts to meet women. He exhibits an attraction to Naomi, which comes to fruition in Episode 4, though they continue seeing other people by the next episode.
Michael Ross	23	Nokesville, Virginia
As a child, Michael's parents were heavily involved in drugs and served jail time, which led to his moving between his grandparents, stepmother and father, beginning at age five. In addition, he lived with mother's growing cancer threat while helping to raise his seven half-siblings. After attending St. Thomas Aquinas Regional School, a Catholic elementary school in Woodbridge, Virginia, he put himself through the University of Maryland, where he dual majored in Rhetoric and Agribusiness, and was the president of the UMD Students against National Healthcare. He is an outspoken libertarian and world hunger solution advocate, and describes himself as a "nerd". Having recently lost his virginity, he says he still has the same morals, eschews going to strip clubs, and looks for women with a compatible personality. Naomi characterizes Mike's intellectualism by remarking that she needs a thesaurus to understand him. Mike sees his biological mother, Tammy, who is in poor health following treatment for breast cancer, for the first time in two years when she visits in Episode 12.
Nany González	21	Jamestown, New York
Nany is a Dominican woman who attended Jamestown Community College, where she majored in criminal justice. She grew up an athlete as well as Semi-Pro Cheerleader. Nany's father was jailed on drug charges before she was born, and having found letters several years old in her mother's closet addressed to her, she is determined to find him, with the support of her mother. She is further spurred to find her biological father after meeting a young homeless man who barely knew his father in Episode 10, and while she learns from a private investigator that she has a brother and sister through him, she is heartbroken to learn that he died in 2002, a year before she found his letters.
Naomi Defensor	22	The Bronx, New York
Naomi is a Puerto Rican/Portuguese American originally from New York who currently resides in Arizona. In 2010, she graduated from Buffalo State College where she majored in journalism, minored in political science and was a member of the Latin Sorority Lambda Theta Alpha. She hopes to obtain a Master's Degree in international politics at the University at Buffalo, and pursue a career as a news reporter or magazine columnist. She has also interned for several entertainment companies, and is an advocate for immigration and gay rights. Though she developed an "emotionally hard and defensive" personality from past conflicts with her mother, she is very close to her family, and is fond of watching movies and listening to music. Described by MTV as "self-reliant", a "firecracker" and "completely open about her life", she has had twelve sexual partners since attending college and regrets none of them. She and Leroy share a romantic night in bed in Episode 4, but resume seeing other people by the next episode.
Heather Cooke	21	California, Maryland
Heather, who goes by her last name "Cooke", is the daughter of a U.S. Naval officer and a native Filipino mother. Their family is tight-knit, and includes an older brother and younger sister. Heather, who harbors a deep connection to her mother's heritage, is the president of her school's Asian Cultural Alliance. She is also Division 1 soccer player, and was a four-year women's soccer letter winner, an All-Metro Atlantic Athletic Conference First Team honoree, and a recipient of the Ernest Lagna and John R. Moller Awards. Explaining that she's a "fierce athlete" who "lives, eats and breathes soccer", she hopes to pursue pro soccer overseas, though she has also considered following in her father's foot steps and joining the Coast Guard. She graduated in 2010 from Loyola University Maryland, where she majored in international business, and prior to moving to Las Vegas, she worked in the Washington, D.C. areas as a junior program analyst. MTV describes her as "a man eater with frequent bi-curious tendencies" who engages in casual sex, though fears she will not find true love as her parents did. She moves into the suite in Episode 7, following Adam's eviction.

=== Duration of cast ===
Cast member	Episodes												
Cast member	1	2	3	4	5	6	7	8	9	10	11	12	13
Dustin	Featured	Featured	Featured	Featured	Featured	Featured	Featured	Featured	Featured	Featured	Featured	Featured	Featured
Heather	Featured	Featured	Featured	Featured	Featured	Featured	Featured	Featured	Featured	Featured	Featured	Featured	Featured
Leroy	Featured	Featured	Featured	Featured	Featured	Featured	Featured	Featured	Featured	Featured	Featured	Featured	Featured
Mike	Featured	Featured	Featured	Featured	Featured	Featured	Featured	Featured	Featured	Featured	Featured	Featured	Featured
Nany	Featured	Featured	Featured	Featured	Featured	Featured	Featured	Featured	Featured	Featured	Featured	Featured	Featured
Naomi	Featured	Featured	Featured	Featured	Featured	Featured	Featured	Featured	Featured	Featured	Featured	Featured	Featured
Cooke							Entered	Featured	Featured	Featured	Featured	Featured	Featured
Adam	Featured	Featured	Featured	Featured	Featured	removed						Return	

Notes

- Adam is removed from the house in Episode 6 after getting kicked out of the hotel following multiple incidents where he destroyed things throughout the hotel and had multiple violent outbursts.
- Cooke replaced Adam in Episode 7.
- Adam makes an appearance in Episode 12.

== Episodes ==
No. overall	No. in season	Title	Original release date	U.S. viewers (millions)
505	1	"Welcome To Las Vegas"	March 9, 2011	1.74
The cast arrives at their suite at Hard Rock Hotel and Casino. Adam and Nany exhibit a mutual attraction, but Nany maintains loyalty to her boyfriend of six years, Jordy. She also questions the sincerity with which Adam expresses feelings for her, given the women he and Leroy brings back to the suite, but Adam believes Nany and Jordy's relationship will not last her stay in Vegas, and plans to exploit any breakup that occurs. Michael struggles with his conservative views on dating and sex, bringing two women back to the suite, only to spend time with them reading prayers. Dustin, despite initially expressing an aversion to romance with his housemates, gives into temptation with Heather, though he also expresses worry that she and the others will learn that he appears as a cast member on Fratpad, a live gay webcam site for which he once worked.
506	2	"Bottles, Bromance and Broken Hearts"	March 16, 2011	2.16
Nany is torn between her long-distance relationship with Jordy and her attraction to Adam, whose drunken behavior results in problems with Hard Rock security, and his castmates. Adam bets a large sum of money at the casino, after Leroy makes him an irresistible offer. Dustin is ambivalent about his relationship with Heather, and angered by Michael's behavior with her when the rest of the cast plays a sexually charged game of Truth or Dare.
507	3	"Stands By Me"	March 23, 2011	2.16
Dustin makes amends with Michael and Heather regarding the previous episode's events, and his relationship with the latter becomes sexual. Adam's drunken behavior again gets him expelled from the same club as in Episode 2. This prompts Leroy, Dustin and Michael to discuss the drugs and other problems that afflicted their parents, and again causes conflict between Adam and the others, particularly Leroy, which continues after Adam reveals his past as a teen drug dealer, including his three-year detention. The roommates meet their boss, Phil, and begin their internship with the Athlete Recovery Fund (ARF), which is putting on a Best Whip contest with motocross racer Carey Hart, who guest stars.
508	4	"Three Hook Ups and a Breakup"	March 30, 2011	1.69
Group trips to Pole Position Raceway and a rodeo lead to an argument between Mike and Dustin over the perception that Dustin is self-absorbed. Nany, despite her disapproval at the disloyalty Adam exhibits toward a girl back home, shares a romantic night with him. This, along with arguments stemming from Jordy's reading her email, leads her to break up with him. Leroy and Naomi also share some bedroom romance.
509	5	"Playas Gettin' Played"	April 6, 2011	2.02
Following the in-suite romance in the previous episode, Leroy and Naomi decide to keep their options open by seeing other people, while continuing their mutual affection. Questions remain over Nany and Adam's relationship status, however, which leads to conflict for them and other potential suitors, another drunken rage by Adam, and the revelation by Nany that she has experienced domestic violence in the past.
510	6	"Sexiles/Exiles"	April 13, 2011	2.17
Adam's behavior from the previous episode continues the next morning, resulting in his ban from Vanity, the hotel's nightclub, and impacting the cast's work assignment. Leroy, who feels he must be evicted from the suite, is angered when his other housemates do not share this view. The hotel, however, indeed evicts Adam. Though Nany is heartbroken, she and Adam hope to maintain their relationship. Michael's awkwardness with women continues, though he attempts to improve his socialization with them. The cast learns a new housemate will move in with them.
511	7	"Cooke Monsters"	April 20, 2011	2.01
Cooke, the new roommate, moves in, but the other women, still reacting to the loss of Adam, are alienated by her attraction to Dustin, and her dismissal of his relationship with Heather. The conflict also reveals that Michael does not hold Dustin in high regard, again alienating them from each other. Naomi is further angered by Cooke's rapport with Leroy and Mike, the three of whom enjoy a night out together. Perceiving disrespect from Cooke, whom they feel has not attempted to befriend the women, Naomi and Nany excoriate her in a heated confrontation, though Cooke later apologizes to Heather for her previous comments.
512	8	"Dustin Shows His Hand, Heather Folds"	April 27, 2011	2.53
Dustin fears his mother is not taking her bipolar disorder medication. He then has to contend with Heather, who is mortified to discover that Dustin appears on gay porn websites called Fratmen and Fratpad under the name Spencer. Dustin tries to explain that he appeared on it when he was 18 and directionless, but his continued equivocation of whether he had sex with other men on the site do not alleviate Heather's feelings of betrayal, nor the cast's feelings that Dustin has been dishonest in concealing this, and hypocritical, given his past remarks about homosexuality. After he temporarily leaves the suite, he and Heather discuss the matter, and break up.
513	9	"Guys Who Like Girls Who Like Girls Who Like Sex"	May 4, 2011	2.27
Naomi experiences pain and a missed period, leading to a STD/pregnancy scare for her and Leroy, which is complicated by her views on how he handles the situation. A visit from Dustin's brother, Quay, and some friends, lifts his spirits in the aftermath of his breakup with Heather. Heather however, deals with the breakup by getting drunk and engaging in a sexual interlude with Nany (though she does not give specifics), which she later regrets. Though Dustin consoles her, they reaffirm their decision not to stay together, leaving Dustin available for Cooke, whose attraction he reciprocates with a kiss.
514	10	"Who's Your Daddy?"	May 11, 2011	2.07
Heather excoriates Cooke and Dustin after learning about their kiss. Cooke later makes amends with Heather, but Heather is ambivalent toward Dustin, for whom she still harbors feelings and exhibits a visible attraction, particularly when drunk. Mike's attempts to alleviate his sexual frustration continue, until he meets a woman named Ally with whom he has much in common, and with whom he prefers to take things slow. The cast's time serving Thanksgiving dinner to young homeless people spurs Nany to hire a private investigator find her biological father, whom she has never met.
515	11	"Oh Yeah, Mexico, Yeah"	May 18, 2011	2.15
Mike takes the initiative in setting up a music-based charity, but he comes into conflict with Dustin over issues of credit and comments about Dustin's past. As Nany's search for her father continues, she writes a letter with which she hopes to form a relationship with him. The cast is sent on holiday to Cancun, where they stay in the same suite as the cast of The Real World: Cancun, but when Dustin gets drunk, he elicits the ire of the rest of the cast, including Mike, to whom he makes physical threats for his prior remarks. Mike subsequently distances himself from the charity in order to avoid Dustin. Nany is elated to learn that Adam will return to Las Vegas, in contrast to Leroy's reaction.
516	12	"Addicted to Love"	May 25, 2011	1.70
Nany is heartbroken to learn that her father died in 2002, but is buoyed to learn she has a brother and a sister named Ileana who wants a relationship with her. Though initially happy at Adam's weekend visit, she distances herself from him after his drunken behavior recurs. Mike's biological mother, Tammy, who is in poor health following past drug use and chemotherapy treatment for breast cancer, sees him for the first time in two years when she visits, spurring thoughts as to whether he should let her into his life again. Naomi impresses the others when the cast tries their hand at motocross. Nany visits her father, Leonel's grave in Bloomfield, Connecticut, where she meets Ileana.
517	13	"Leaving Las Vegas"	June 1, 2011	2.18
As the cast's time in Las Vegas nears its end, Naomi convinces Michael to marry her in a mock wedding at The Little White Wedding Chapel. Heather and Dustin bond as they decorate a guitar to be auctioned at a "Let the Kids Rock" roller derby fundraiser, which the cast promotes on KXTE-FM radio, though Dustin is irritated by Cooke and Naomi's hi-jinks the night before their television appearance on FOX 5 Las Vegas. Leroy briefly returns home after learning a close friend was killed by the police, giving Mike and Dustin time to reestablish their friendship. The cast spends its last night sleeping on the bowling alley, during which Heather and Dustin declare their love for each other, before parting ways the following morning.

== After filming ==
The Real World: Las Vegas Reunion aired on June 8, 2011, and was hosted by Maria Menounos, featuring the entire cast, as they discussed their time during filming and their lives since the show ended.

Since filming, Leroy returned to his sanitation job in Dallas, while Heather returned to Monmouth University to pursue a major in TV communications. Naomi returned to Buffalo State College to pursue TV journalism, and keeps in touch with Nany, who returned to Jamestown, New York, where she works as a waitress, and hopes to pursue opportunities elsewhere. Cooke began working at a nuclear power plant in North Carolina, where she started a relationship with a man named Jacob. Michael returned to College Park, Maryland, and hopes to attend grad school for agricultural development, while Dustin returned to Louisiana, and stays active with his friends, physical activities and rides his motorcycle.

Cooke discussed her rough first impressions with her housemates when she moved into the suite, including a kiss with Dustin that was instigated by Leroy, which caused jealousy on Heather's part. An argument occurred when Mike accused Dustin of homophobia, after Dustin's past in gay porn was discussed. Heather stated she was still puzzled as to why Dustin kept further details about his past hidden. Dustin tried to offer a friendship to Mike, but was met with resistant by Mike, stating narcissism on Dustin's part. Leroy's promiscuity was discussed, with opinions by Naomi on his ability to maintain future relationships, though Leroy's "bromance" with Mike resulted in friendship bracelets. Also discussed were the Twitter wars amongst the housemates, with a preview of The Challenge: Rivals closing out the reunion. Following the reunion, it was revealed that Dustin and Heather had begun to live together.

Dustin and Heather continued their relationship when appearing on The Challenge: Battle of the Exes, and were cast members on the third season of Couples Therapy, in which they sought counseling for problems in their relationship stemming from issues of commitment and Dustin's past in gay pornography. In July 2013, Dustin was arrested on suspicion of sexual battery inside a Lafayette, Louisiana nightclub.

In 2014, Michael married Taylor Roberts. His former roommates Adam, Leroy, Cooke and Nany were in attendance at his wedding alongside Laurel Stucky from The Challenge: Fresh Meat II. The rest of the castmates who could not attend send him well wishes on Twitter.

Adam Royer moved to California and he is currently a law clerk and a father of two: Hudson and Harlow.

In 2017, Leroy Garrett appeared on Fear Factor. He was paired with Johnny Devenanzio from The Real World: Key West and competed against Aneesa Ferreira, Laurel Stucky and stars from MTV's Winter Break: Hunter Mountain. In 2019, he also appeared on Game of Clones looking for a J.Lo lookalike. In 2020, Garrett moved to Houston with Kam Williams from Are You the One?, whom he first met on season 31 of The Challenge. On May 17, 2022, their son Kingston Lee was born. The couple's first daughter, Aria, was born on February 24, 2024. After his 12th season of The Challenge, Garrett spoke about castmate Camila Nakagawa's racist outburst on season 30, and how he felt after the producers allowed her to remain in the competition after the fact.

Cooke was flown out to Argentina with the initial cast of the first season of The Challenge: All Stars to serve as an alternate in case anyone got disqualified. She was ultimately sent home after being unused.

=== The Challenge ===
This is the fourth season of The Real World whose entire cast has competed on The Challenge. The first three are The Real World: Boston, The Real World: New Orleans and The Real World: Austin.

Cast member	Seasons of The Challenge	Other appearances
Adam Royer	Rivals	—N/a
Dustin Zito	Battle of the Exes, Battle of the Seasons (2012), Free Agents, Battle of the Exes II	—N/a
Heather Cooke	Rivals II	—N/a
Heather Marter	Battle of the Exes	—N/a
Leroy Garrett	Rivals, Battle of the Exes, Rivals II, Free Agents, Battle of the Exes II, Battle of the Bloodlines, Rivals III, XXX: Dirty 30, Vendettas, War of the Worlds, War of the Worlds 2, Double Agents, Battle of the Eras, Vets & New Threats	The Challenge: All Stars (season 4), The Challenge: All Stars (season 5)
Michael Ross	Rivals	—N/a
Nany González	Battle of the Seasons (2012), Rivals II, Free Agents, Battle of the Exes II, Battle of the Bloodlines, Rivals III, War of the Worlds, War of the Worlds 2, Total Madness, Double Agents, Spies, Lies & Allies, Ride or Dies, Vets & New Threats	The Challenge: All Stars (season 5)
Naomi Defensor	Battle of the Exes, Rivals II	—N/a

== See also ==
- List of television shows set in Las Vegas
