= Hans Smit =

Indonesian-born Filipino football coach (born 1958)

Personal information
- Full name: Hans-Peter Van Sprew Smit
- Date of birth: June 29, 1958 (age 68)
- Place of birth: Jakarta, Indonesia
- Positions: Sweeper; midfielder

Youth career
- Years: Team
- ?: UP Fighting Maroons

Managerial career
- 1981–?: De La Salle Santiago Zobel
- 1996: Philippines (assistant)
- ?: Kaya
- ?: National Capital Region (youth)
- ?: DLSU Lady Booters
- 2008: Philippines (women's)

Hans-Peter Van Sprew Smit (born June 29, 1958) is an Indonesian-born Filipino football coach. He was an assistant coach of the Philippine national football team, which participated at the 1996 Tiger Cup.

He was a long-time head coach of the DLSU Lady Booters which played in the University Athletic Association of the Philippines (UAAP), as well as at the PFF Women's League.

== Early life and education ==
Smit was born as an Indonesian citizen in Jakarta, Indonesia but moved to the Philippines at age 6. Smit attended the University of the Philippines Diliman for his college and pursued a sports major program after considering to pursue a course in Human Resource Management and Mass Communication. He represented his school as a varsity player at the UAAP Football Championships. He voluntarily chose to drop out from the university to focus on his coaching career.

== Coaching career ==
Smit started his coaching career in football at age 21 making him the youngest football coach in the country at that time. He began his coaching career with the newly formed De La Salle Santiago Zobel School football team in 1981. He also became the youngest Athletic Director in the country when he initiated a varsity program for the Alabang-based De La Salle Santiago Zobel School. Smit coached the schools' boys' team.

Among the other teams Smit had coached is Kaya and the National Capital Region youth team.

Smit led the DLSU Lady Booters to the top of its group at the elimination round of the UAAP Season 77 football tournament in 2015. In 2016, he served as the first head coach of the team at the PFF Women's League mentoring the team in the 2016-17 season. He guided the team in its 3–0 win against OutKast on their first match of the second round of the league's season which assured them of the league title.

Smit also organizes football festivals, leagues and national championships. He is an official Match Commissioner for the Philippine Football Federation and certified by the Asian Football Confederation.

=== International ===
Smit had a brief stint as head coach of the Philippine women's national team in 2008. He replaced Marlon Maro who last led the team at the 2007 Southeast Asian Games. Smit led the team at the 2008 AFC Women's Asian Cup qualifiers. He was replaced by Joey Villarino the same year who was first tasked to guide the team at the 2008 AFF Women's Championship.

== Personal life ==
Smit is married to Carmencita Carlos Smit a natural-born Filipino and has four children who are all likewise born Filipino.

== Naturalization ==
A bill was filed on March 17, 2015 before the Senate by Senators Pia and Alan Cayetano regarding the granting of Philippine citizenship to Hans Smit for staying more than 50 years in the country and for his contribution to Philippine football.

On June 6, 2016, the bill was approved in the Senate in the third and final reading, in time for the 16th Congress' sine die adjournment. On July 21, 2016, Smit became a naturalized Filipino citizen with the lapsing into law of the bill now known as Republic Act No. 10914, which was regarding his naturalization.
