= Rabah Benlarbi =

Football coach

Managerial career
- Years: Team
- 2016–2017: Myanmar U18
- 2016–2017: Phoenix F.C.
- 2018: Philippines (women's)

Rabah Benlarbi is a French football coach who was the head coach of the Philippines women's national football team, leading them in the 2018 AFC Women's Asian Cup. He was part of Juventus FC's backroom staff from 2001 until 2003.

== Career ==
=== Myanmar Under-18 ===
The Frenchman went to Myanmar as part of the Goal Project, a project started by FIFA to aid development in peripheral football nations.

Chosen to lead the Myanmar Under-18s for the 2017 AFF U-18 Youth Championship, Benlarbi guided the team to a 7–0 win over Brunei in the group stage, coming second in their group before tying with Malaysia in the knockout stage and losing on penalties. Shortly after the match, Benlarbi was suspicious of the tournament officials for choosing a referee of Vietnamese nationality to officiate the game since he thought that if the referee was from an ASEAN nation he would make unfair decisions. Losing the third-place play-off to Indonesia 7–1 in what the coach described as a terrible loss, he parted ways with the Myanmar Football Federation in September 2017, two months earlier than his contract was supposed to expire.

Benlarbi was head of the Myanmar U17 starting from November 2016.

=== Philippines women ===
The Philippine Football Federation appointed him as assistant coach of the Philippines women's national football team. On March 15, 2018, he was appointed as head coach of the national team with Coaches Joyce Landagan and Steven Joseph Hoffman as his assistants. He led the national team at the 2018 AFC Women's Asian Cup.
