= 2012 AFF Women's Championship =

Tournament details
- Host country: Vietnam
- City: Ho Chi Minh City
- Dates: 13–22 September
- Teams: 7 (from 1 confederation)
- Venue: 1 (in 1 host city)

Final positions
- Champions: Vietnam (2nd title)
- Runners-up: Myanmar
- Third place: Thailand
- Fourth place: Laos

Tournament statistics
- Matches played: 12
- Goals scored: 77 (6.42 per match)
- Top scorer(s): (Vietnam) Nguyễn Thị Muôn (7 goals)

The 2012 AFF Women's Championship was football tournament held from 13 to 22 September 2012 in Vietnam. All games were played at the Thong Nhat Stadium, Ho Chi Minh City.

Host nation Vietnam won their second title after beating Myanmar in the final via penalty shoot-out.

== Group stage ==
- All times listed are UTC+7.

=== Group A ===
| Team | Pld | W | D | L | GF | GA | GD | Pts |
|---|---|---|---|---|---|---|---|---|
| Vietnam (H) | 3 | 3 | 0 | 0 | 16 | 3 | +13 | 9 |
| Myanmar | 3 | 2 | 0 | 1 | 15 | 2 | +13 | 6 |
| Philippines | 3 | 1 | 0 | 2 | 9 | 9 | 0 | 3 |
| Singapore | 3 | 0 | 0 | 3 | 2 | 28 | −26 | 0 |

(H) Hosts
13 September 2012
16:00

| Myanmar | 3–0 | Philippines |
|---|---|---|
| San San Maw 5', 82' (pen.); Nilar Myint 38' | Report |

Thong Nhat Stadium, Ho Chi Minh City
Referee: Rita Gani (Malaysia)
13 September 2012
18:30

| Vietnam | 10–0 | Singapore |
|---|---|---|
| Nguyễn Thị Muôn 7', 18', 24', 40'; Nguyễn Thị Hòa 9'; Nguyễn Thị Minh Nguyệt 49', 54', 63'; Nguyễn Thị Tuyết Dung 55'; Nguyễn Thị Xuyến 76' | Report |

Thong Nhat Stadium, Ho Chi Minh City

15 September 2012
16:00

| Philippines | 2–4 | Vietnam |
|---|---|---|
| Cooke 53', 89' | Report | Nguyễn Thị Muôn 17'; Nguyễn Thị Kim Tiến 25'; Lê Thu Thanh Hương 61'; Nguyễn Thị Tuyết Dung 66' |

Thong Nhat Stadium, Ho Chi Minh City
Referee: Kate Jacewicz (Australia)
15 September 2012
18:30

| Singapore | 0–11 | Myanmar |
|---|---|---|
| | Report | Khin Moe Wai 6', 13', 58'; San San Maw 24', 44'; Nilar Myint 19', 41'; Yee Yee Oo 45+1', 69'; Baker 81' (o.g.); Thidar Oo 87' |

Thong Nhat Stadium, Ho Chi Minh City

17 September 2012
16:00

| Myanmar | 1–2 | Vietnam |
|---|---|---|
| San San Maw 38' | Report | Trần Thị Kim Hồng 8' (pen.); Chương Thị Kiều 77' |

Thong Nhat Stadium, Ho Chi Minh City
Referee: Patchaya Boonprasit (Thailand)
17 September 2012
18:30

| Philippines | 7–2 | Singapore |
|---|---|---|
| Cooke 37', 55', 57'; P. Impelido 19'; Magdolot 75'; Nierras 76'; Komarc 90' | Report | Kamaliah 71', 77' |

Thong Nhat Stadium, Ho Chi Minh City

=== Group B ===
| Team | Pld | W | D | L | GF | GA | GD | Pts |
|---|---|---|---|---|---|---|---|---|
| Thailand | 2 | 2 | 0 | 0 | 7 | 0 | +7 | 6 |
| Laos | 2 | 1 | 0 | 1 | 3 | 5 | −2 | 3 |
| Malaysia | 2 | 0 | 0 | 2 | 2 | 7 | −5 | 0 |

14 September 2012
16:00

| Thailand | 4–0 | Malaysia |
|---|---|---|
| Junpen 10'; Nisa 31'; Wilaiporn 75'; Chidtawan 84' | Report |

Thong Nhat Stadium, Ho Chi Minh City
Referee: Mai Hoàng Trang (Vietnam)

16 September 2012
16:00

| Malaysia | 2–3 | Laos |
|---|---|---|
| Masturah 41'; Zaryatie 79' | Report | Keota 6'; Souphavanh 19'; Suchitta 80' (pen.) |

Thong Nhat Stadium, Ho Chi Minh City
Referee: Công Thị Dung (Vietnam)

18 September 2012
16:00

| Thailand | 3–0 | Laos |
|---|---|---|
| Anootsara 6'; Taneekarn 35'; Junpen 82' | Report |

Thong Nhat Stadium, Ho Chi Minh City
Referee: Kate Jacewicz (Australia)

== Knockout stage ==
Semi-finals
20 September – Ho Chi Minh City
Vietnam | 7
Laos | 0
20 September – Ho Chi Minh City
Thailand | 0
Myanmar | 1

Final
22 September – Ho Chi Minh City
Vietnam (p) | 0 (4)
Myanmar | 0 (3)
Third Place
22 September – Ho Chi Minh City
Laos | 1
Thailand | 14

=== Semi-finals ===
20 September 2012
16:00

| Vietnam | 7–0 | Laos |
|---|---|---|
| Nguyễn Thị Minh Nguyệt 5', 66'; Nguyễn Thị Muôn 15', 18'; Nguyễn Thị Hòa 68', 72'; Lê Thu Thanh Hương 77' | Report |

Thong Nhat Stadium, Ho Chi Minh City
Referee: Kate Jacewicz (Australia)

20 September 2012
18:30

| Thailand | 0–1 | Myanmar |
|---|---|---|
| | Report | San San Maw 67' |

Thong Nhat Stadium, Ho Chi Minh City
Referee: Rita Gani (Malaysia)

=== Third place match ===
22 September 2012
16:00

| Laos | 1–14 | Thailand |
|---|---|---|
| Souphavanh 44' | Report | Junpen 2', 8', 66', 81'; Rattikan 13', 20'; Chidtawan 36'; Kanjana 63', 64', 90'; Anootsara 79'; Duangnapa 70'; Taneekarn 83', 85' |

Thong Nhat Stadium, Ho Chi Minh City
Referee: Mai Hoàng Trang (Vietnam)

=== Final ===
22 September 2012
18:30

| Vietnam | 0–0 (a.e.t.) | Myanmar |
|---|---|---|
| | Report |
Penalties
| Trần Thị Kim Hồng (penalty scored); Lê Thị Thương (penalty scored); Nguyễn Thị Minh Nguyệt (penalty scored); Lê Thu Thanh Hương (penalty scored) | 4–3 | Myint Myint Aye (penalty scored); Phu Pwint Khaing (penalty scored); Nilar Myint (penalty scored); Khin Moe Wai (penalty missed); Khin Marlar Tun (penalty missed) |

Thong Nhat Stadium, Ho Chi Minh City
Referee: Patchaya Boonprasit (Thailand)

== Awards ==
2012 AFF Women's Championship champions

Vietnam
Second title

== Goalscorers ==
7 goals

- (Vietnam) Nguyễn Thị Muôn

6 goals

- (Myanmar) San San Maw
- (Thailand) Junpen Seesraum

5 goals

- (Philippines) Heather Cooke
- (Vietnam) Nguyễn Thị Minh Nguyệt

3 goals

- (Myanmar) Khin Moe Wai
- (Myanmar) Nilar Myint
- (Thailand) Kanjana Sung-Ngoen
- (Thailand) Taneekarn Dangda
- (Vietnam) Nguyễn Thị Hòa

2 goals

- (Laos) Souphavanh Phayvanh
- (Malaysia) Kamaliah Hashim
- (Myanmar) Yee Yee Oo
- (Thailand) Chidtawan Chawong
- (Thailand) Anootsara Maijarern
- (Thailand) Rattikan Thongsombut
- (Vietnam) Nguyễn Thị Tuyết Dung
- (Vietnam) Lê Thu Thanh Hương

1 goals

- (Laos) Keota Phongoudom
- (Laos) Suchitta Phonharath
- (Malaysia) Masturah Majid
- (Malaysia) Zaryatie Zakaria
- (Myanmar) Thidar Oo
- (Philippines) Abigail Komarc
- (Philippines) Patrice Impelido
- (Philippines) Marice Magdolot
- (Philippines) Samantha Nierras
- (Thailand) Wilaiporn Boothduang
- (Thailand) Nisa Romyen
- (Thailand) Duangnapa Sritala
- (Vietnam) Chương Thị Kiều
- (Vietnam) Nguyễn Thị Kim Tiến
- (Vietnam) Nguyễn Thị Xuyến
- (Vietnam) Trần Thị Kim Hồng

1 own goal

- (Singapore) Shida Baker (playing against Myanmar)

== Final ranking ==
| Pos | Team | Pld | W | D | L | GF | GA | GD | Pts | Final result |
|---|---|---|---|---|---|---|---|---|---|---|
| 1 | Vietnam (H) | 5 | 4 | 1 | 0 | 23 | 3 | +20 | 13 | Champions |
| 2 | Myanmar | 5 | 3 | 1 | 1 | 16 | 2 | +14 | 10 | Runners-up |
| 3 | Thailand | 4 | 3 | 0 | 1 | 21 | 2 | +19 | 9 | Third place |
| 4 | Laos | 4 | 1 | 0 | 3 | 4 | 26 | −22 | 3 | Fourth place |
| 5 | Philippines | 3 | 1 | 0 | 2 | 9 | 9 | 0 | 3 | Eliminated in group stage |
| 6 | Malaysia | 2 | 0 | 0 | 2 | 2 | 7 | −5 | 0 | Eliminated in group stage |
| 7 | Singapore | 3 | 0 | 0 | 3 | 2 | 28 | −26 | 0 | Eliminated in group stage |

(H) Hosts
