= Philippines women's national football team =

Philippines
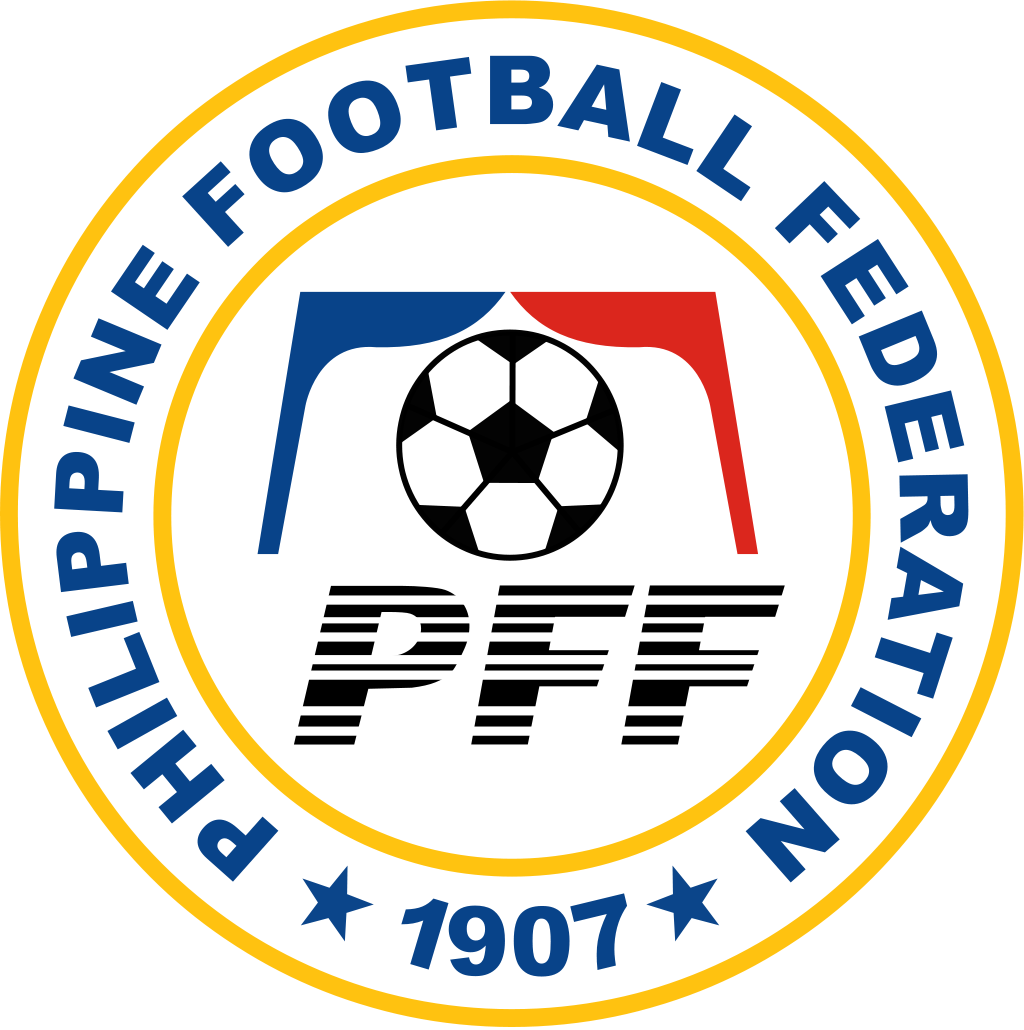
- Nickname: Filipinas
- Association: Philippine Football Federation
- Confederation: AFC (Asia)
- Sub-confederation: AFF (Southeast Asia)
- Head coach: Mark Torcaso
- Captain: Hali Long
- Most caps: Hali Long (110)
- Top scorer: Sarina Bolden (31)
- Home stadium: Rizal Memorial Stadium
- FIFA code: PHI

FIFA ranking
- Current: 39 (October 20, 2026)
- Highest: 38 (December 2023)
- Lowest: 92 (October 2007)

First international
- Hong Kong 2–0 Philippines (Hong Kong; June 7, 1981)

Biggest win
- Philippines 16–0 Tonga (Sydney, Australia; April 22, 2022)

Biggest defeat
- China 21–0 Philippines (Kota Kinabalu, Malaysia; September 24, 1995)

World Cup
- Appearances: 1 (first in 2023)
- Best result: Group stage (2023)

Asian Cup
- Appearances: 11 (first in 1981)
- Best result: Semifinals (2022)

ASEAN Championship
- Appearances: 12 (first in 2004)
- Best result: Champions (2022)
Medal record
ASEAN Women's Championships
Gold medal – first place	2022 Philippines	Team
Southeast Asian Games
Gold medal – first place	2025 Thailand	Team
Bronze medal – third place	1985 Bangkok	Team
Bronze medal – third place	2021 Hanoi	Team

The Philippines women's national football team represents the Philippines in international women's association football competitions. It is managed by the Philippine Football Federation (PFF), the sport's governing body in the country.

The Philippines women's national football team was established in the 1980s and has been a regular participant in the AFC Women's Asian Cup since their first appearance in 1981, back when the tournament was known as the AFC Women's Championship. The Philippines hosted the tournament in 1999, with matches played in Iloilo and Bacolod. The team took a hiatus from the continental tournament after competing in 2003. Following the AFC's introduction of a qualification process from the 2006 edition, the Philippines successfully returned to the AFC Women's Asian Cup in 2018, having qualified the previous year, and achieved a historic milestone by advancing beyond the group stage for the first time. Their success continued into the 2022 edition, where they reached the semifinals and secured their qualification for the 2023 FIFA Women's World Cup, marking the national team's debut at the tournament. They subsequently secured their second consecutive appearance by qualifying for the 2027 FIFA Women's World Cup as the sole representative from Southeast Asia.

In Southeast Asian football, the Philippines women's team won their first AFF Women's Championship title in 2022. In the Southeast Asian Games, the team achieved a historic breakthrough in 2025 by winning their first-ever gold medal. Prior to this victory, their notable accomplishments in the regional meet included bronze medal finishes in 1985 and in 2021.

From December 2023 to March 2024, the team achieved their highest-ever position, 38th, in the FIFA Women's World Ranking.

== History ==
=== Early years ===
The Philippines women's national football team was formally organized after the Philippine Ladies' Football Association (PLFA) was established in 1980 by footballer Cristina Ramos, who later became a member of the team. The Philippines took part in the 1983 Asian Women's Championship in Thailand although the tournament at the time was not sanctioned by FIFA or the Asian Football Confederation (AFC). In order for the Philippines to be eligible to participate in FIFA tournaments, the PLFA and, in extension, the women's national team would have to be an affiliate of the PFF, the Philippines' national sports association for football. The PLFA later became part of the PFF.

The Philippines was among the teams which competed in the 1985 Southeast Asian Games in Thailand, the first-ever edition of the games to host women's football. The team clinched its first podium finish in a tournament by finishing in third place. However, the football event of the tournament was only contested by two other teams, Thailand and Singapore, with the Philippines not winning a single match.

=== 2000s ===
Marlon Maro, a former defender for the Philippines men's national team, coached the women's national football team as early as 2001 when he guided the national team through the 2001 Southeast Asian Games. He was head coach of the national team until 2007, coaching the Philippines for the last time at the 2007 Southeast Asian Games.

=== 2010s ===
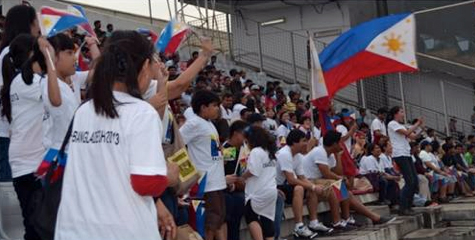
Fans of the Philippines national team at the Bangabandhu National Stadium in Dhaka

The Philippines national team participated at the 2011 AFF Women's Championship in Laos on October 16–25, after being inactive for the last 21 months.

The national team participated in a training camp in the United States in 2012. The team management scouted for players with Filipino heritage in the United States for the national team. Part of the training camp was participation in the 2012 LA Viking Cup, which saw the national team play against American club sides California Cosmos, Metro Stars, and Leon. The team won the tournament by beating the California Cosmos in the final 4–3 on extra time following a 1–1 draw, earning the team their first-ever trophy, albeit in a minor tournament.

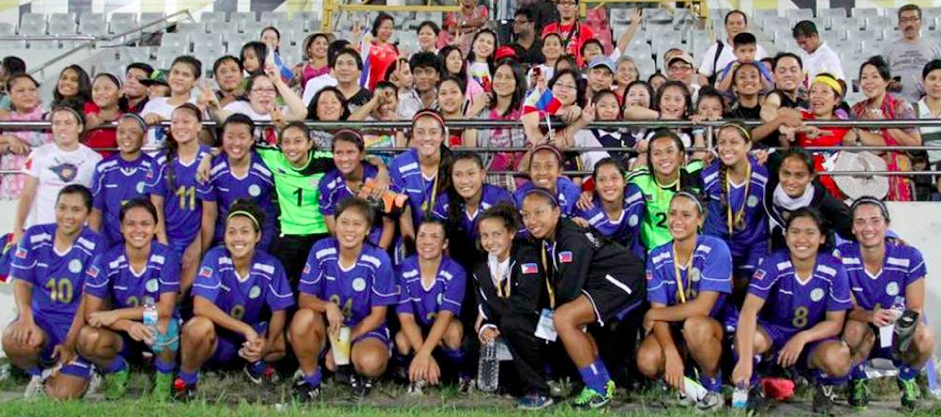
The Philippines national football team after their away match against Bangladesh on May 25, 2013, in Dhaka.

The national team attempted to qualify for the 2014 AFC Women's Asian Cup. The Philippines was grouped with Bangladesh, Iran and Thailand at the qualifiers single group stage with the winner advancing to the Asian Cup finals. The team fell short of qualifying after losing to eventual group winners Thailand by a single goal despite winning convincingly over its other group opponents, Iran and Bangladesh.

At the 2013 AFF Women's Championship, the Philippines was grouped with Laos, Indonesia, hosts Myanmar, and the Japan under-23 team, who were invited to the tournament. The team failed to proceed to the knockout stage after placing third in the group, with only the top two teams proceeding to the next phase of the tournament. The Philippines lost to Japan U23 and Myanmar and won against the other two teams.

At the 2013 Southeast Asian Games, the women's national football team failed to get past the group stage, losing against the two other nations grouped with the country and failing to score a single goal.

In February 2015, PFF general secretary Ed Gastanes said that the head coach position for the women's national team was vacant after its previous holder, Ernie Nierras, was not an A license coach, meaning he was not able to continue his coaching stint. Nierras led the team in his last competitive match as coach in 2013. The PFF announced in April 2015 that former footballer Buda Bautista was appointed as head coach and was first tasked to lead the team at the 2015 AFF Women's Championship. Bautista also became the first female coach of the national team. The Philippines failed to get past the group stage of the 2015 AFF Women's Championship, only winning a game against Malaysia and losing the other two matches.

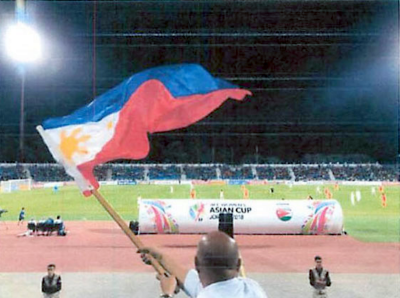
Jordan v. Philippines; 2018 AFC Asian Cup

2017 would mark the entry of businessman Jefferson Cheng as a sponsor of the Philippines national team. who also was appointed the team manager of the team in 2017.

Still under Bautista, the Philippines qualified for the 2018 AFC Women's Asian Cup in Jordan, the first time the national team qualified for the AFC Women's Asian Cup since a qualification phase was introduced starting from the 2006 competition; prior to the inception of qualifications, the Philippines had participated in every iteration of the tournament except for three, failing to reach the knockout stages in each participation. The team finished second in their group in the qualifiers, in which each of the group's winners qualify for the Asian Cup. Jordan won the group, but since it had already qualified as hosts of the 2018 edition of the tournament, the virtue of qualification went to the group's runners-up.

In 2017, the PFF launched the "Project Jordan" task force to help the team qualify for the 2019 FIFA Women's World Cup through the 2018 Asian Cup. The PFF secured major sponsorship and hired United States–based English coach, Richard Boon; an identification camp was held in the United States participated by national team players and prospects. A three-month training camp in the United States was later set up in late December 2017. In March 2018, Boon was replaced by French coach Rabah Benlarbi as the national team held a camp at the PFF National Training Centre in Carmona, Cavite. The national team held their last camp under "Project Jordan" in Japan from March 20 to 27, 2018.

At the 2018 Asian Cup, the Philippines failed to reach the knockout stage leading to the championship, by which doing so would have resulted in automatic qualification for the 2019 World Cup. However, by finishing third in their group, the team qualified for a special fifth place match, of which the winner qualifies for the World Cup; it was the first time the Philippines advanced beyond the group stage of the Asian Cup in their participation history. The country, then ranked 72nd in the FIFA Women's World Rankings, failed to qualify for the World Cup after losing 5–0 to the 16th-ranked South Korea in the fifth place match of the tournament.

The Philippines competed at the 2019 Southeast Asian Games, which was hosted at home, but were denied a bronze medal by Myanmar.

=== 2020s ===

The starting lineup of the Filipinas that qualified for the 2023 FIFA Women's World Cup.

The Philippines did not play any games since the 2019 Southeast Asian Games due to the COVID-19 pandemic. Despite this, they attained their highest-ever world ranking then at 65th place by the end of 2020.

Guided by Marlon Maro, who returned as head coach of the team, the Philippines qualified for the 2022 AFC Women's Asian Cup in India after featuring in the qualifiers held in September 2021 despite almost a year of inactivity after beating Nepal and Hong Kong in Tashkent, Uzbekistan. Alen Stajcic was appointed as head coach in October 2021. At the 2022 Asian Cup group stage, they defeated Thailand 1–0, ending a 13-match losing streak against their Southeast Asian rivals. The team advanced to the knockout stage for only the second time in their Asian Cup participation, beating Chinese Taipei in the quarterfinals on penalties following a 1–1 draw and qualifying for the 2023 FIFA Women's World Cup. It was the first time that the Philippines qualified for the FIFA Women's World Cup, and the first time the country qualified for a FIFA World Cup of any gender or age level. The national team also improved their Asian Cup record by reaching the semifinals of the tournament, where they lost 2–0 to South Korea. This consequently moved them 10 places up the FIFA Women's World Rankings to 54th place, setting a new peak rank. Stajcic also had his contract with the team extended to after the 2023 World Cup.

At the 2021 Southeast Asian Games in Vietnam, which was held in May 2022 due to the pandemic, the Filipinas repeated their success from the previous edition by reaching the knockout stage. Despite losing to Thailand 3–0 in the semifinals, the Philippines defeated Myanmar 2–1 to win the bronze medal in a rematch of the 2019 edition. The team achieved their best finish at the tournament in 37 years.

On June 23, 2022, the Filipinas recorded their first win on European soil after defeating Bosnia and Herzegovina 3–0 in a friendly in Brežice, Slovenia.

==== 2022 AFF Women's Championship ====
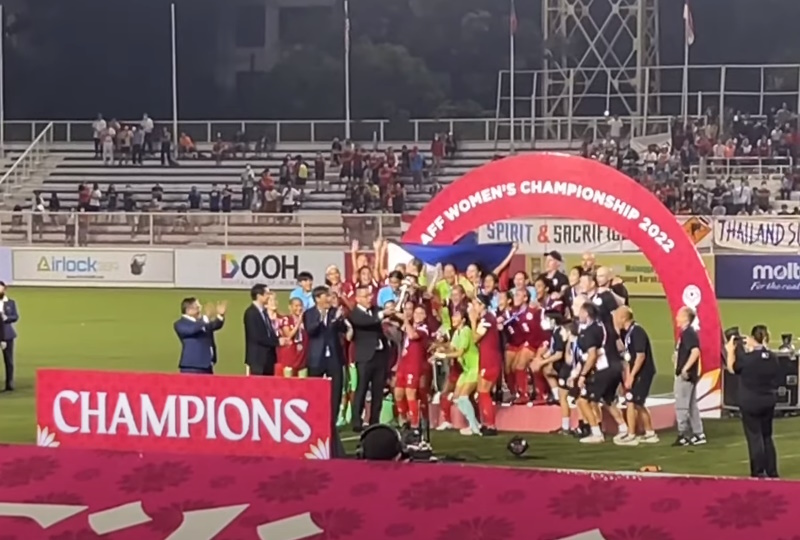
The Philippines national team celebrating their 2022 AFF title.

The Philippines hosted the 2022 AFF Women's Championship. They secured their first-ever final appearance in a FIFA-sanctioned tournament and guaranteed a podium finish by upsetting defending champions Vietnam 4–0 in the semifinals, recording their best finish at the AFF Women's Championship yet. It also marked the Filipinas' first win against Vietnam after 16 matches against each other, who, alongside Thailand, have been their most-matched opponents in their 42-year history. The team went on to defeat Thailand 3–0 in the final, which was attended by 8,257 spectators at the Rizal Memorial Stadium in Manila, Philippines, and clinched their first-ever title in any major tournament.

==== Road to World Cup ====
The Philippines was invited to participate in the 2023 Pinatar Cup in San Pedro del Pinatar, Spain, to prepare for its maiden Women's World Cup bid. The Philippines were the first non-European team to join the Pinatar Cup. The team played against Wales, Scotland, and Iceland, making them the lowest-ranked team in the tournament. They lost all of their matches and finished in fourth place with zero points having scored only one goal in the tournament, a 90th-minute free kick by Meryll Serrano against Scotland.

The Filipinas played the first round of the 2024 AFC Women's Olympic Qualifying Tournament in Dushanbe, Tajikistan, defeating all three opponents without a single goal conceded, and at the 2023 Southeast Asian Games in Cambodia. At the latter tournament, they failed to reach the semifinals after finishing third in the group behind Myanmar, whom they lost to 1–0.

==== 2023 FIFA Women's World Cup ====
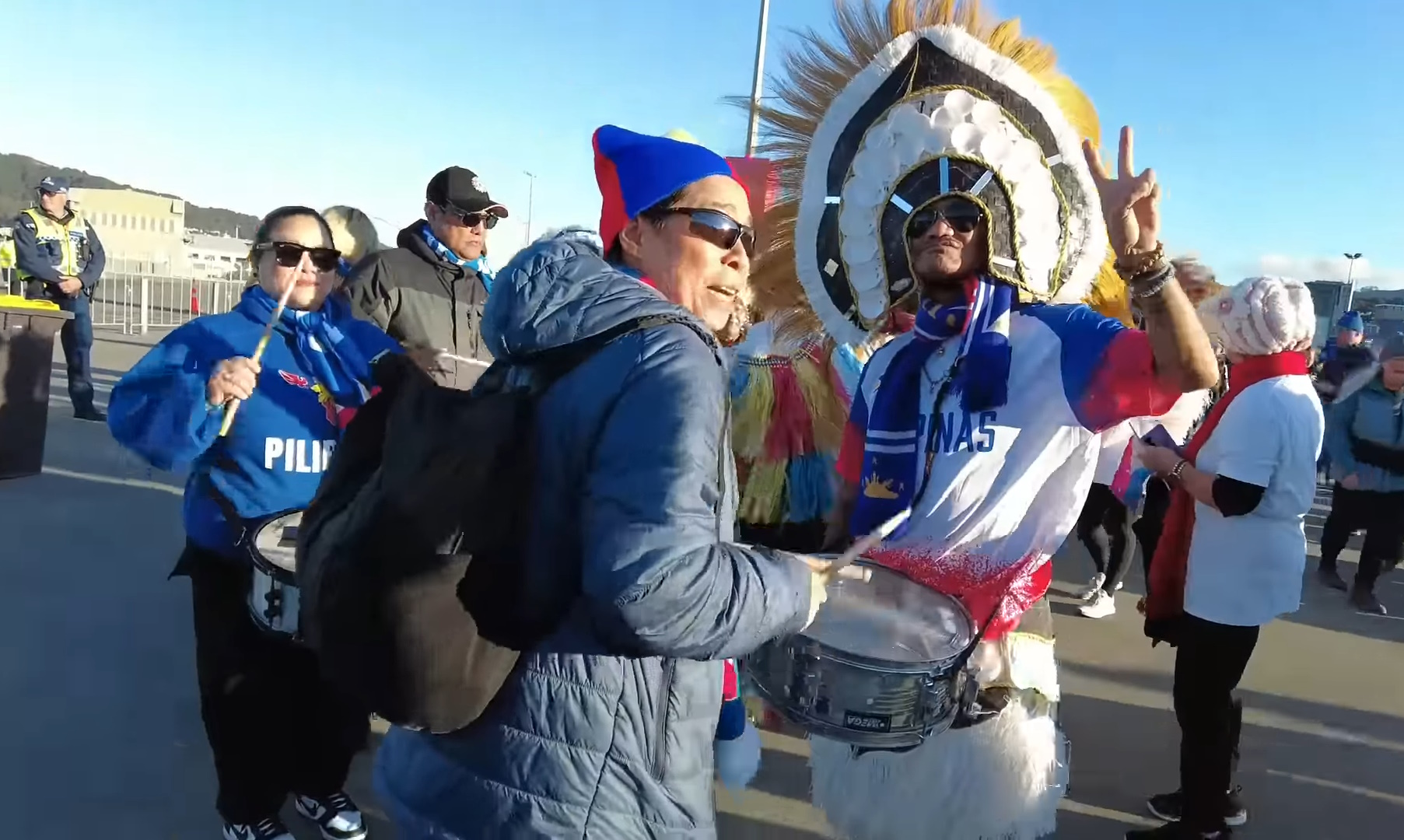
Fans supporting the Philippines at the 2023 FIFA Women's World Cup.

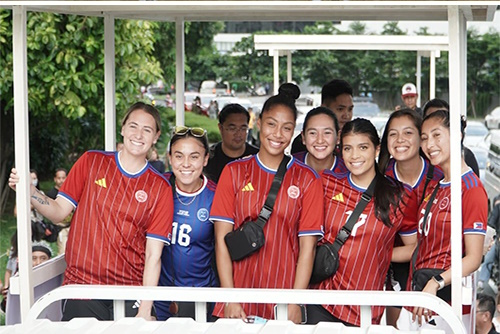
Players of the national team on a motorcade in Taguig shortly after the conclusion of their World Cup campaign.

Debutants Philippines were drawn into Group A alongside Norway, Switzerland, and tournament co-hosts New Zealand. The Filipinas were selected from pot 4, thus were the lowest-ranked team in Group A.

The Philippines played their first group stage match at the 2023 FIFA Women's World Cup in Dunedin, New Zealand, on July 20, 2023, suffering a 2–0 defeat against Switzerland. On July 25, 2023, in Wellington, the Filipinas won 1–0 against New Zealand, their first match victory at a FIFA Women's World Cup. Sarina Bolden scored the winning goal, which was the Philippines' first-ever goal in the competition, in the 24th minute through a header from Sara Eggesvik's cross. Goalkeeper Olivia McDaniel was awarded the player of the match for her performance in the historic win, registering numerous saves against the co-hosts and keeping a clean sheet. However, the team lost 6–0 in their final group match against Norway, the highest-ranked team in their group, with Alicia Barker committing an own goal, Sofia Harrison being sent off for a careless dive, and the Filipinas conceding a hat-trick to Norway's Sophie Román Haug at Eden Park in Auckland. They finished last in Group A with three points thanks to their win against the Football Ferns, but failed to reach the knockout stage in their debut World Cup. Stajcic's contract as head coach expired thereafter.

==== Post-World Cup tournaments ====
In August 2023, Mark Torcaso was appointed as the head coach of the Philippines women's team under a two-year contract. Until December, Torcaso concurrently coached Western United FC in the A-League Women. The Filipinas played in the football tournament of the postponed 2022 Asian Games in China in September 2023. It was their first ever participation in the tournament. They were able to advance to the quarterfinals where eventual champions Japan ended their run.

The Philippines took part in the second round of the 2024 AFC Women's Olympic Qualifying Tournament in Perth, Australia, later that year. Their 8–0 defeat against hosts Australia on the second matchday took place in front of a sold-out crowd of 59,155 at the Perth Stadium, having been relocated from the much smaller Perth Rectangular Stadium to meet the strong demand. The Philippines failed to advance to the third round and thus qualify for the women's football tournament of the 2024 Summer Olympics after finishing as the second-best runners-up among the three groups in the qualifying tournament, wherein only the best-ranked runners-up would advance.

There was uncertainty after John Gutierrez's election as PFF president in November 2023. However in January 2024, it was announced that sponsor Jefferson Cheng, whose best feat was to help the team qualify for the FIFA Women's World Cup, would be retained as team manager.

In February 2024, the Philippines played in the 2024 Pinatar Cup against Scotland and Slovenia. They finished the tournament in fourth place after losing 1–0 to Slovenia in the third-place playoff.

In June 2024, Cheng stepped down from the role, citing that the situation was "not workable" due to an "incompatibility" and "misalignment" of goals with the current organization. Friendlies, especially with teams from other confederations, became less frequent after this.

In June 2025, the Philippines started their campaign to secure a berth at the 2026 AFC Women's Asian Cup via the qualifiers in Cambodia. The Philippines qualified on July 5, 2025, after their 1–0 win against Hong Kong. They also won their two prior games against Saudi Arabia (3–0) and hosts Cambodia (6–0).

==== 2025 Southeast Asian Games ====
In December 2025, the Philippines competed in the 2025 Southeast Asian Games held in Thailand. The team was drawn into Group B alongside defending champions Vietnam, Myanmar, and Malaysia. The campaign began with a 1–2 loss to Myanmar, putting the team's knockout stage hopes in jeopardy. However, they recovered in their second match to defeat Vietnam 1–0, courtesy of a stoppage-time goal from rookie Mallie Ramirez. A decisive 6–0 victory over Malaysia, highlighted by an Alexa Pino hat-trick, secured the Philippines' progression to the semi-finals as group runners-up.

In the semi-finals at the Chonburi Stadium, the Filipinas faced the hosts, Thailand. After conceding the opening goal in the 53rd minute, the Philippines equalized late in the match when Jael Guy converted a penalty in the 87th minute following a handball violation. With the score deadlocked at 1–1 after extra time, the Philippines won the ensuing penalty shootout 4–2, with Guy, Alex Carpio, Sara Eggesvik, and Hali Long converting their spot kicks to book the team's first-ever appearance in the gold medal match.

The final saw a rematch against Vietnam. After a goalless draw following 120 minutes of regulation and extra time, the match was decided by a penalty shootout. The Philippines defeated Vietnam 6–5 on penalties, with goalkeeper Olivia McDaniel making the winning save to secure the country's first SEA Games gold medal in women's football.

==== 2027 FIFA Women's World Cup qualification ====
In March 2026, the Philippines participated in the 2026 AFC Women's Asian Cup in Australia, which served as the Asian qualification tournament for the 2027 FIFA Women's World Cup in Brazil. After advancing to the knockout stage as one of the best third-placed teams, the Filipinas were defeated 0–7 by Japan in the quarter-finals, sending them to the play-in round. On March 19, 2026, the Philippines defeated Uzbekistan 2–0 at the Robina Stadium on the Gold Coast, with second-half goals from Angela Beard and Jaclyn Sawicki, both assisted by crosses from Jael-Marie Guy. This victory secured their second consecutive appearance at the FIFA Women's World Cup. They became the sixth nation overall to qualify for the 2027 edition, and the only team from Southeast Asia to secure a direct berth.

== Team image ==
=== Nicknames ===
Nicknames of the Philippines national team
Nickname	In use
Malditas	2005–2022
Filipinas	2022–present

The Philippines women's national football team was historically nicknamed the "Malditas". Although the term lacks a direct English equivalent, translations range from a mild epithet ("damned" or "accursed") to an expression of reverence or fear ("badasses"). The nickname was adopted by the team during the 2005 Southeast Asian Games under head coach Ernest Nierras, who intended it to reflect the players' palaban (combative or gutsy) nature and symbolize a resilient squad that opponents would fear. In October 2021, head coach Marlon Maro proposed dropping the nickname, arguing that the word could be interpreted pejoratively as "bratty". However, following Maro's departure in late 2021, the proposal did not advance, as players at the time expressed a preference for retaining the moniker.

In March 2022, the Philippine Football Federation (PFF) announced that they would be officially adopting the nickname "Filipinas" for the team, which is the standard demonym for female citizens of the Philippines. Team manager Jefferson Cheng explained the change by noting that while "malditas" is unique, it translates to "damned" in Spanish and Portuguese and carries a pejorative connotation in Tagalog. He added that it had become increasingly problematic to repeatedly explain the nickname's intended meaning to international audiences. Cheng also clarified that "Filipinas" is intended to be used as a standalone moniker and should not be preceded by a geographic modifier (e.g., the Philippine Filipinas).

=== Colors ===
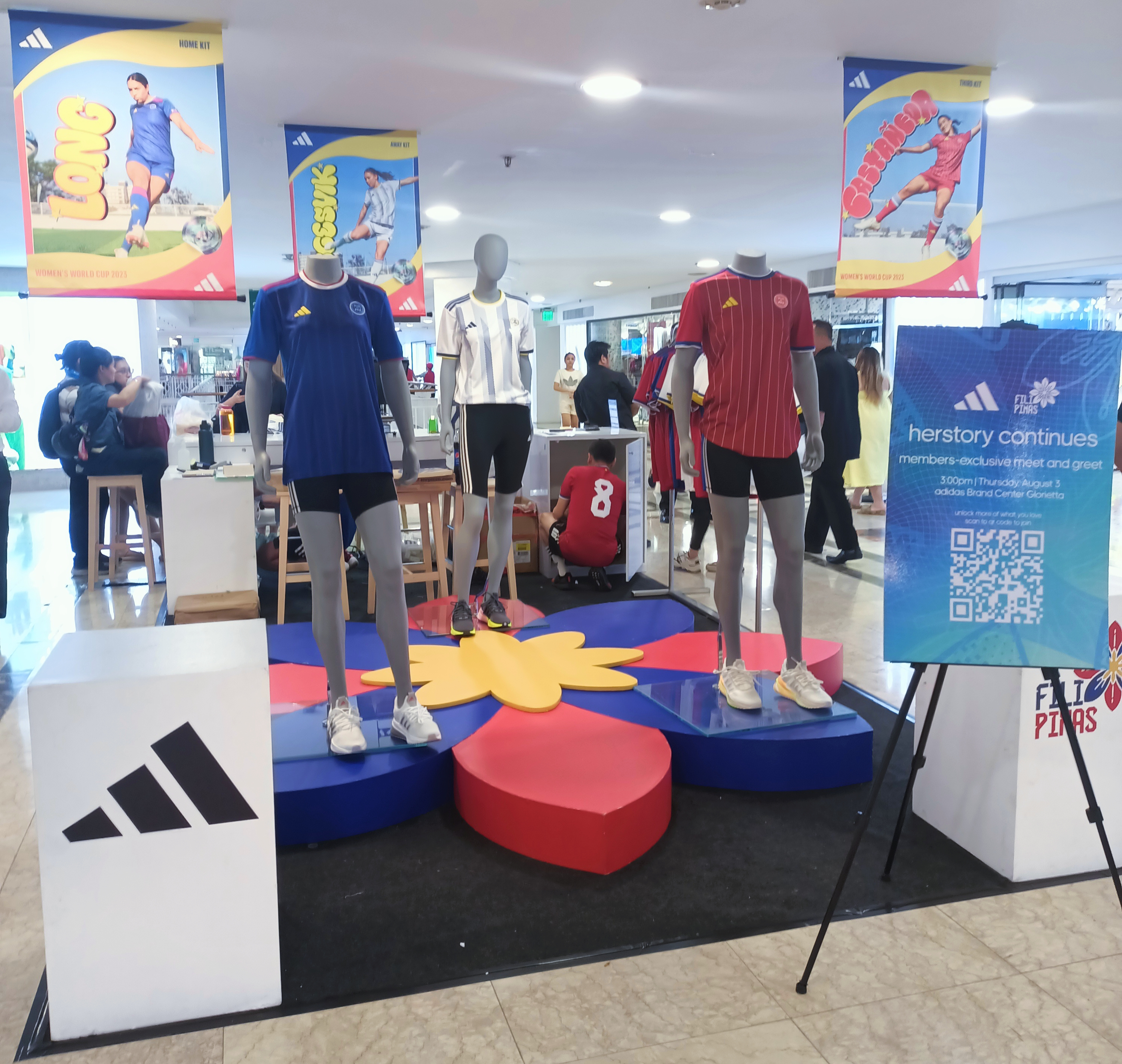
The three 2023 FIFA Women's World Cup football jerseys of the Philippines on display at Glorietta mall in Makati

German sportwear brand Adidas is the official kit provider for the Philippines women's national team since February 2023. There are three sets for the 2023 FIFA Women's World Cup released in May 2023; blue, red and white.

=== Home stadium ===
The earliest recorded home matches of the Philippines women's national team were held at the Iloilo Sports Complex, it was during the 1999 AFC Women's Championship when the country hosted the tournament. The national team also held official international matches at the PhilSports Football and Athletics Stadium and Moro Lorenzo Football Field. In October 2015, a Memorandum of Understanding was signed by the Philippine Football Federation and the local government of Biñan, allowing the national team to use the Biñan Football Stadium as their home stadium for the next four years. The national team has recently played the majority of its matches at the Rizal Memorial Stadium in Manila, which is the Philippines' national stadium.

Philippines women's national football team home stadiums
Image	Stadium	Capacity	Location	Last match
	Rizal Memorial Stadium	12,873	Manila	v Uzbekistan (October 29, 2025; Friendly)
	PhilSports Football and Athletics Stadium	10,000	Pasig	v Singapore (June 5, 2001; PFF Women's Invitational Championships)
	Iloilo Sports Complex	7,000	Iloilo City	v Thailand (November 16, 1999; 1999 AFC Women's Championship)
	Biñan Football Stadium	3,000	Biñan	v Vietnam (December 5, 2019; 2019 Southeast Asian Games)
	PFF National Training Center	1,000	Carmona	v Macau (August 3, 2019; Friendly)
	Moro Lorenzo Football Field	100	Quezon City	v Guam SSC (May 31, 2001; PFF Women's Invitational Championships)

== FIFA World Ranking ==
As of September 25, 2026, after the match against Japan. Only official matches against senior national teams are counted.

Best Ranking Best Mover Worst Ranking Worst Mover

Philippines' FIFA World Ranking history
	Rank	Year	Games played	Won	Lost	Drawn	Best		Worst	
	Rank	Year	Games played	Won	Lost	Drawn	Rank	Move	Rank	Move
1	39 (October 20, 2026)	2026	9	3	5	1				
2	41	2025	14	8	2	4	39	▲2	41	Steady
3	41	2024	7	1	6	0	39	▼1	41	▼2
4	38	2023	19	10	9	0	38	▲6	49	▲4
5	53	2022	29	17	9	3	53	▲1	54	▲10
6	64	2021	2	2	0	0	64	▲4	68	▼3
7	65	2020	0	0	0	0	65	▲2	67	Steady
8	67	2019	15	7	6	3	67	▲7	74	Steady
9	74	2018	12	5	6	1	72	▲3	74	▼1

== Results and fixtures ==
The following is a list of match results in the last 12 months, as well as any future matches that have been scheduled.

Legend

Win Draw Loss Fixture Void or Postponed

=== 2025 ===
December 5 2025 SEA Games	Myanmar	2–1	Philippines	Chonburi, Thailand
16:00 UTC+7	Win Theingi Tun 4'; May Htet Lu 89'		Ramirez 69'	Stadium: IPE Chonburi Stadium

December 8 2025 SEA Games	Philippines	1–0	Vietnam	Chonburi, Thailand
18:30 UTC+7	Ramirez 90+4'	Report		Stadium: Chonburi Stadium; Referee: Gulshoda Saidqulova (Uzbekistan)

December 11 2025 SEA Games	Philippines	6–0	Malaysia	Chonburi, Thailand
16:00 UTC+7	Pino 45', 53', 70' (pen.); Cowart 68'; Markey 85'; Castañeda 90+6'			Stadium: IPE Chonburi Stadium; Referee: Sunita Thongthawin (Thailand)

December 14 2025 SEA Games SF	Thailand	1–1 (a.e.t.) (2–4 p)	Philippines	Chonburi, Thailand
18:30 UTC+7	Jiraporn 53'	Report	Guy 87' (pen.)	Stadium: Chonburi Stadium; Referee: Esra'a Almbaidin (Jordan)
	Penalties
	Jiraporn (penalty scored); Taneekarn (penalty scored); Pluemjai (penalty missed); Orapin (penalty missed)		(penalty scored) Guy; (penalty scored) Carpio; (penalty scored) Eggesvik; (penalty scored) Long

December 17 2025 SEA Games Gold medal match	Philippines	0–0 (a.e.t.) (6–5 p)	Vietnam	Chonburi, Thailand
19:30 UTC+7		Report		Stadium: Chonburi Stadium; Referee: Rebecca Durcau (Australia)
	Penalties
	Guy (penalty scored); Pino (penalty scored); Long (penalty scored); Beard (penalty scored); Markey (penalty scored); Sawicki (penalty scored)		(penalty scored) Huỳnh Như; (penalty scored) Ngọc Minh Chuyên; (penalty scored) Nguyễn Thị Trúc Hương; (penalty scored) Hoàng Thị Loan; (penalty scored) Cù Thị Huỳnh Như; (penalty missed) Trần Thị Thu

=== 2026 ===
March 1 AFC Women's Asian Cup GS	Australia	1–0	Philippines	Perth, Australia
17:00 UTC+8	Kerr 14'	Report (AFC); Report (FIFA)		Stadium: Perth Stadium; Attendance: 44,379; Referee: Dong Fangyu (China)

March 5 AFC Women's Asian Cup GS	Philippines	0–3	South Korea	Gold Coast, Australia
13:00 UTC+10		Report (AFC); Report (FIFA)	Jeon Yu-gyeong 12'; Park Soo-jeong 15'; Mun Eun-ju 56'	Stadium: Gold Coast Stadium; Attendance: 2,332; Referee: Lê Thị Ly (Vietnam)

March 8 AFC Women's Asian Cup GS	Iran	0–2	Philippines	Gold Coast, Australia
19:00 UTC+10		Report (AFC); Report (FIFA)	Eggesvik 29'; C. McDaniel 82'	Stadium: Gold Coast Stadium; Attendance: 2,384; Referee: Jin Tian (China)

March 15 AFC Women's Asian Cup QF	Japan	7–0	Philippines	Sydney, Australia
16:00 UTC+11	Takana 45'; Koga 45+3', 76'; Chiba 65'; Matsukubo 67'; Tanikawa 86'; Ueki 90'	Report (AFC); Report (FIFA)		Stadium: Accor Stadium; Attendance: 17,205; Referee: Dong Fangyu (China)

March 19 AFC Women's Asian Cup PI	Uzbekistan	0–2	Philippines	Gold Coast, Australia
13:00 UTC+10		Report (AFC); Report (FIFA)	Beard 47'; Sawicki 52'	Stadium: Gold Coast Stadium; Attendance: 1,922; Referee: Casey Reibelt (Australia)

June 4 Unofficial Friendly	San Diego Wave (United States)	1–0	Philippines	San Diego, United States
--:-- UTC−7	(o.g.)	Report

June 9 Unofficial Friendly	Albion San Diego (United States)	0–2	Philippines	San Diego, United States
11:30 UTC−7		Report	C. McDaniel; Oca	Stadium: Point Loma Nazarene University

September 14 2026 Asian Games GS	Philippines	1–1	Uzbekistan	Gifu, Japan
14:00 UTC+9	Collins 89'	Report	Egamberdieva 81'	Stadium: Gifu Nagaragawa Stadium; Referee: Lê Thị Ly (Vietnam)

September 17 2026 Asian Games GS	Hong Kong	0–2	Philippines	Gifu, Japan
19:00 UTC+9		Report	Leach 12' Ramirez 63'	Stadium: Gifu Nagaragawa Stadium

September 21 2026 Asian Games GS	China	5–1	Philippines	Gifu, Japan
16:00 UTC+9	Wang Yanwen 20', 40', 54'; Chen Qiaozhu 49'; Yuan Cong 90+2'	Report	Leach 65'	Stadium: Gifu Nagaragawa Stadium; Attendance: 1,022; Referee: Esraa Almbaiden (Jordan)

September 25 2026 Asian Games QF	Japan	4–0	Philippines	Fukuroi, Japan
19:30 UTC+9	Takarada 2', 36'; Ueno 26'; Kamiya 45+2'	Report		Stadium: Shizuoka Stadium ECOPA; Attendance: 1,084; Referee: Esra'a Al-Mbaiden (Jordan)

October 9 Unofficial Friendly	Peru	2–1	Philippines	Chincha Alta, Peru
15:00 UTC−5	Bilcape 1', 86'	Report	Meier 20' (o.g.)	Stadium: Videnita de Chincha

October 13 Unofficial Friendly	Peru	0–2	Philippines	Chincha Alta, Peru
14:00 UTC−5		Report	Penn 20'; Ramirez 42'	Stadium: Videnita de Chincha

November 29 Friendly	New Zealand	v	Philippines	Wellington, New Zealand
		Report		Stadium: Porirua Park

December 4 Friendly	New Zealand	v	Philippines	Wellington, New Zealand
		Report		Stadium: Porirua Park

== Head-to-head record ==
As of September 25, 2026, after the match against Japan

Positive record Neutral record Negative record

Team	Pld	W	D	L	GF	GA	GD	Confederation
Australia	4	0	0	4	0	20	−20	AFC
Bahrain	1	0	1	0	1	1	0	AFC
Bangladesh	1	1	0	0	4	0	+4	AFC
Bosnia and Herzegovina	2	2	0	0	5	1	+4	UEFA
Cambodia	2	2	0	0	11	0	+11	AFC
Chile	2	0	1	1	1	2	−1	CONMEBOL
China	6	0	0	6	1	55	−54	AFC
Chinese Taipei	7	1	1	5	7	28	−21	AFC
Costa Rica	2	0	1	1	2	3	−1	CONCACAF
Fiji	2	2	0	0	13	2	+11	OFC
Finland	2	0	0	2	0	10	−10	UEFA
Guam	1	1	0	0	2	1	+1	AFC
Haiti	1	0	0	1	0	7	−7	CONCACAF
Hong Kong	16	9	2	5	26	10	+16	AFC
Iceland	1	0	0	1	0	5	−5	UEFA
India	2	0	0	2	0	13	−13	AFC
Indonesia	8	5	1	3	24	11	+13	AFC
Iran	4	4	0	0	11	0	+11	AFC
Iraq	1	1	0	0	4	0	+4	AFC
Republic of Ireland	1	0	0	1	0	1	−1	UEFA
Japan	7	0	0	7	1	68	−67	AFC
Jordan	3	2	0	1	6	6	0	AFC
Kazakhstan	1	0	1	0	0	0	0	UEFA
Kenya	1	0	0	1	1	4	−3	CAF
Laos	2	1	1	0	8	4	+4	AFC
Macau	1	1	0	0	2	0	+2	AFC
Malaysia	13	8	4	1	31	5	+26	AFC
Mongolia	1	1	0	0	5	1	+4	AFC
Myanmar	18	2	2	14	11	45	−34	AFC
Nepal	2	2	0	0	7	1	+6	AFC
New Zealand	2	1	0	1	2	2	0	OFC
Norway	1	0	0	1	0	6	−6	UEFA
North Korea	1	0	0	1	1	14	−13	AFC
Pakistan	1	1	0	0	4	0	+4	AFC
Palestine	1	1	0	0	7	0	+7	AFC
Papua New Guinea	2	2	0	0	14	1	+13	OFC
Saudi Arabia	1	1	0	0	3	0	+3	AFC
Scotland	2	0	0	2	1	4	−3	UEFA
Singapore	12	9	0	3	43	16	+27	AFC
Slovenia	1	0	0	1	0	1	−1	UEFA
South Korea	7	0	0	7	2	24	−22	AFC
Switzerland	1	0	0	1	0	2	–2	UEFA
Tajikistan	3	3	0	0	19	1	+18	AFC
Thailand	18	2	1	15	11	65	−54	AFC
Timor-Leste	2	2	0	0	14	0	+14	AFC
Tonga	2	2	0	0	21	0	+21	OFC
United Arab Emirates	3	3	0	0	12	1	+11	AFC
Uzbekistan	6	1	2	3	6	11	−5	AFC
Vietnam	20	3	1	16	12	74	−62	AFC
Wales	1	0	0	1	0	1	−1	UEFA

== Technical staff ==
=== Current technical staff ===
As of September 21, 2026

Position	Name
Head coach	(Australia) Mark Torcaso
Assistant coach	(Australia) Lachlan Leong
Assistant coach	(Australia) Riccardo Marchioli
Assistant coach	(Australia) George Mcheileh
Goalkeeping coach	(Serbia) Borivoje Ristić

== Coaching history ==
List of head coaches of the Philippines
Nationality	Name	Period	Ref./Notes
(Philippines)	Edward Magallona	1981	
(Philippines)	Orlando Plagata	1985	
(Philippines)	Antonio Morales	1988	
(Philippines)	Marlon Maro	1999–2007	
(Indonesia)	Hans Smit	2008	(Note: Smit was born as an Indonesia citizen, but became a naturalized Filipino citizen in 2016.)
(Philippines)	Joel Villarino	2008–2009	
(Philippines)	Ernest Nierras	2011–2013	
(Philippines)	Buda Bautista	2013–2017	
(Philippines)	Let Dimzon	2017	
(England)	Richard Boon	2017–2018	(Note: English coach based in the United States that oversaw the Philippine national team's training camp in the United States. The national team has never played an official FIFA match under Boon's watch.)
(France)	Rabah Benlarbi	2018	
(Philippines)	Buda Bautista	2018	
(Philippines)	Let Dimzon	2018–2019	
(Philippines)	Marlon Maro	2021	
(Australia)	Alen Stajcic	2021–2023	
(Australia)	Mark Torcaso	2023–	

== Players ==
=== Current squad ===
The following 26 players were named to the squad for the friendly matches against New Zealand on November 29 and December 4, 2026

Caps and goals updated as of September 25, 2026, after the match against Japan.

No.	Pos.	Player	Date of birth (age)	Caps	Goals	Club
	GK	Olivia McDaniel	October 14, 1997 (age 29)	67	0	Free agent
	GK	Nina Meollo	June 23, 2004 (age 22)	2	0	(Chinese Taipei Football Association) Taichung Blue Whale
	GK	Gabrielle Rourke		0	0	(United States Soccer Federation) USF Bulls
	DF	Hali Long (captain)	January 21, 1995 (age 31)	110	22	(Football Australia) Brisbane Roar
	DF	Jessika Cowart	October 30, 1999 (age 27)	50	3	Free agent
	DF	Angela Beard	August 16, 1997 (age 29)	30	2	(Football Australia) Melbourne Victory
	DF	Reina Bonta	April 17, 1999 (age 27)	20	0	Free agent
	DF	Azumi Oka	April 21, 2006 (age 20)	8	0	(United States Soccer Federation) UNC Greensboro Spartans
	DF	Jourdyn Curran	May 11, 2003 (age 23)	7	0	(United States Soccer Federation) Salmon Bay
	DF	Katana Norman	September 28, 2004 (age 22)	6	0	(German Football Association) VfB Stuttgart
	DF	Kellie Pagador		0	0	Free agent
	MF	Sara Eggesvik	April 29, 1997 (age 29)	55	7	(Norwegian Football Federation) LSK Kvinner
	MF	Carleigh Frilles	April 11, 2002 (age 24)	53	13	(Football Australia) Western Sydney Wanderers
	MF	Jaclyn Sawicki	November 14, 1992 (age 34)	52	2	(Canadian Soccer Association) Calgary Wild
	MF	Katrina Guillou	December 19, 1993 (age 32)	50	13	(Football Australia) Brisbane Roar
	MF	Ariana Markey	June 8, 2007 (age 19)	8	1	(United States Soccer Federation) Pepperdine Waves
	MF	Skye Leach	October 8, 2003 (age 23)	4	2	(Football Australia) Melbourne Victory
	MF	Camryn Penn	October 15, 2004 (age 22)	4	0	(United States Soccer Federation) Cal Poly Mustangs
	MF	Kyra Murphy		0	0	(United States Soccer Federation) Pepperdine Waves
	MF	Alex Pendleton		0	0	(United States Soccer Federation) Pepperdine Waves
	FW	Chandler McDaniel	February 4, 1998 (age 28)	36	13	(Mexican Football Federation) Atlante
	FW	Alexa Pino	March 1, 2007 (age 19)	14	5	(United States Soccer Federation) Kentucky Wildcats
	FW	Dionesa Tolentin	June 25, 2000 (age 26)	14	2	(Philippine Football Federation) Kaya–Iloilo
	FW	Mallie Ramirez	September 1, 2004 (age 22)	13	3	(Football Association of Serbia) Crvena zvezda
	FW	Jael-Marie Guy	August 15, 2007 (age 19)	9	1	(United States Soccer Federation) Brown Bears
	FW	Mara Cochon		0	0	(United States Soccer Federation) UC Irvine Anteaters

=== Recent call-ups ===
The following players have been called up for the Philippines within the past 12 months.

Pos.	Player	Date of birth (age)	Caps	Goals	Club	Latest call-up
GK	Leah Bradley	April 7, 2009 (age 17)	0	0	(United States) Liberty Flames	October 2026 training camp
GK	Gabrielle Baker	May 10, 2007 (age 19)	0	0	(United States) Louisville Cardinals	June 2026 training camp
GK	Kiara Fontanilla	July 1, 2000 (age 26)	9	0	Free agent	February 2026 training camp
GK	Isabelle Mapanao	August 30, 2003 (age 23)	0	0	(United States) Rose State Raiders	February 2026 training camp
GK	Inna Palacios^{RET}	February 8, 1994 (age 32)	52	0	Retired	2025 SEA Games
DF	Kaya Hawkinson	April 17, 2000 (age 26)	26	1	(Philippines) Kaya–Iloilo	October 2026 training camp
DF	Aiselyn Sia	February 23, 2009 (age 17)	2	0	(United States) Illinois Fighting Illini	October 2026 training camp
DF	Amaya Bautista		0	0	Free agent	October 2026 training camp
DF	Sofia Wunsch	February 16, 1999 (age 27)	66	3	Free agent	2026 Asian Games
DF	Janly Fontamillas	January 24, 2000 (age 26)	0	0	(Philippines) Kaya–Iloilo	2026 Asian Games
DF	Malea Cesar	December 9, 2003 (age 22)	38	1	(United States) Trinity Tigers	June 2026 training camp
DF	Janae DeFazio	September 6, 2001 (age 25)	11	0	(Philippines) Kaya–Iloilo	2026 AFC Women's Asian Cup
MF	Isabella Pasion	July 14, 2006 (age 20)	26	0	Free agent	October 2026 training camp
MF	Rocelle Mendaño	May 19, 2000 (age 26)	0	0	(Philippines) Kaya–Iloilo	October 2026 training camp
MF	Charisa Lemoran	September 21, 1998 (age 28)	27	1	(Philippines) Kaya–Iloilo	2026 Asian Games
MF	Megan Murray	November 23, 2005 (age 20)	9	0	(United States) Marquette Golden Eagles	2026 Asian Games
MF	Téa Pidding	October 31, 2008 (age 18)	0	0	(United States) Elon Phoenix	2026 Asian Games
MF	Chardonnay Curran	August 18, 1999 (age 27)	0	0	(Portugal) Rio Ave	June 2026 training camp
MF	Anicka Castañeda	December 16, 1999 (age 26)	43	12	(Chinese Taipei) Taichung Blue Whale	2026 AFC Women's Asian Cup
MF	Ava Villapando	May 8, 2008 (age 18)	0	0	(United States) LSU Tigers	2026 AFC Women's Asian Cup
MF	Aaliyah Schinaman	September 5, 2003 (age 23)	2	1	(United States) George Mason Patriots	February 2026 training camp
MF	Quinley Quezada	April 7, 1997 (age 29)	68	25	(Serbia) T6 Nika	November 2025 training camp
MF	Emma Tovar	December 4, 2003 (age 22)	0	0	(Australia) Perth Glory	November 2025 training camp
FW	Alessandrea Carpio	March 4, 2002 (age 24)	16	0	(Philippines) Kaya–Iloilo	October 2026 training camp
FW	Alyssa White		0	0	(United States) Illinois Fighting Illini	October 2026 training camp
FW	Natalie Collins	May 28, 2007 (age 19)	3	1	(United States) Boise State Broncos	2026 Asian Games
FW	Meryll Serrano	July 20, 1997 (age 29)	30	9	(Norway) Haugesund	June 2026 training camp
FW	Natalie Oca	November 3, 2006 (age 20)	5	0	(United States) UC San Diego Tritons	June 2026 training camp
FW	Kiera Wagner		0	0	(United States) Northwestern Wildcats	June 2026 training camp
FW	Paige McSwigan	November 9, 2003 (age 23)	3	0	(United States) North Florida Ospreys	2026 AFC Women's Asian Cup
FW	Nina Mathelus	September 12, 2008 (age 18)	9	1	(United States) Thayer Academy	2025 SEA Games
^{COV} Withdrew due to COVID-19^{INJ} Withdrew due to an injury^{PRE} Included in the preliminary squad^{RET} Retired from the national team^{SUS} Serving suspension

=== Previous squads ===
Previous squads of the Philippines
Tournament	Edition
FIFA Women's World Cup	2023
AFC Women's Asian Cup	2018; 2022; 2026
Asian Games	2022
ASEAN Women's Championship	2013; 2015; 2016; 2018; 2019; 2022; 2025
Southeast Asian Games	2013; 2017; 2019; 2021; 2023; 2025

== Competitive record ==
=== FIFA Women's World Cup ===
The Philippines first qualified for the FIFA Women's World Cup during the 2023 edition. It did not attempt to qualify for the inaugural FIFA Women's World Cup in 1991 with its non-participation at the 1991 AFC Women's Championship, which served as the Asian qualifiers of the World Cup. The national team first attempted to qualify for the succeeding editions of the tournament from 1995 except for the 2011 edition.

FIFA Women's World Cup record
Year	Result	Position	GP	W	D*	L	GF	GA	GD
(China) 1991	Did not enter								
(Sweden) 1995	Did not qualify								
(United States) 1999	Did not qualify								
(United States) 2003	Did not qualify								
(China) 2007	Did not qualify								
(Germany) 2011	Did not enter								
(Canada) 2015	Did not qualify								
(France) 2019	Did not qualify								
(Australia) (New Zealand) 2023	Group stage	24th	3	1	0	2	1	8	–7
(Brazil) 2027	Qualified								
(Costa Rica) (Jamaica) (Mexico) (United States) 2031	To be determined								
(United Kingdom) 2035	To be determined								
Total	2/10	24th	3	1	0	2	1	8	–7

*Draws include knockout matches decided on penalty kicks.

=== Olympic Games ===
The Philippines entered a qualification tournament for the Olympics. At the first two editions of the Olympics where women's football was played, the standings at the preceding FIFA Women's World Cup were used. With the country failing to qualify for the final tournament of the 1995 and 1999 FIFA Women's World Cups the country failed to qualify for the 1996 and 2000 Olympics.

Summer Olympic Games record
Year	Result	Position	GP	W	D*	L	GF	GA	GD
(United States) 1996	Did not qualify								
(Australia) 2000	Did not qualify								
(Greece) 2004	Did not enter								
(China) 2008	Did not enter								
(United Kingdom) 2012	Did not enter								
(Brazil) 2016	Did not enter								
(Japan) 2020	Did not qualify								
(France) 2024	Did not qualify								
(United States) 2028	Qualification in progress								

=== AFC Women's Asian Cup ===
Champions Runners up Third place Fourth place

AFC Women's Asian Cup record									Qualification						
Year	Result	GP	W	D*	L	GF	GA	GD	GP	W	D*	L	GF	GA	GD
(Hong Kong) 1975	Did not enter								No Qualification						
(Taiwan) 1977	Did not enter								No Qualification						
(India) 1980	Did not enter								No Qualification						
(Hong Kong) 1981	Group stage	3	0	0	3	1	14	−13	No Qualification						
(Thailand) 1983	Group stage	5	1	0	4	2	16	−14	No Qualification						
(Hong Kong) 1986	Did not enter								No Qualification						
(Hong Kong) 1989	Did not enter								No Qualification						
(Japan) 1991	Did not enter								No Qualification						
(Malaysia) 1993	Group stage	3	0	0	3	0	32	−32	No Qualification						
(Malaysia) 1995	Group stage	3	0	1	2	0	23	−23	No Qualification						
(China) 1997	Group stage	3	0	0	3	2	32	−30	No Qualification						
(Philippines) 1999	Group stage	4	1	0	3	5	8	−3	No Qualification						
(Taiwan) 2001	Group stage	3	0	0	3	1	17	−16	No Qualification						
(Thailand) 2003	Group stage	4	1	0	3	2	26	−24	No Qualification						
(Australia) 2006	Did not qualify								2	0	0	2	2	10	−8
(Vietnam) 2008	Did not qualify								5	1	2	2	4	16	−12
(China) 2010	Did not enter								Did not enter						
(Vietnam) 2014	Did not qualify								3	2	0	1	10	1	+9
(Jordan) 2018	Sixth place	4	1	0	3	3	12	−9	5	3	1	1	18	6	+12
(India) 2022	Semi-finals	5	2	1	2	8	7	+1	2	2	0	0	4	2	+2
(Australia) 2026	Quarter-finals	5	2	0	3	4	11	–7	3	3	0	0	10	0	+10
(Uzbekistan) 2029	To be determined								To be determined						
Total:11/21	Semi-finals	42	8	2	32	28	198	−170	20	11	3	6	48	35	+13

AFC Women's Asian Cup history
Season	Round	Opponent	Scores	Result	Venue
1981	Group stage	Hong Kong	0–2	Loss	Hong Kong
1981	Group stage	India	0–8	Loss	Hong Kong
1981	Group stage	Singapore	1–4	Loss	Hong Kong
1983	Group stage	India	0–5	Loss	Thailand
1983	Group stage	Malaysia	0–1	Loss	Thailand
1983	Group stage	Singapore	0–5	Loss	Thailand
1983	Group stage	Hong Kong	2–0	Won	Thailand
1983	Group stage	Thailand	0–5	Loss	Thailand
1993	Group stage	Hong Kong	0–5	Loss	Malaysia
1993	Group stage	Japan	0–15	Loss	Malaysia
1993	Group stage	Chinese Taipei	0–12	Loss	Malaysia
1995	Group stage	China	0–21	Loss	Malaysia
1995	Group stage	Kazakhstan	0–0	Draw	Malaysia
1995	Group stage	Hong Kong	0–2	Loss	Malaysia
1997	Group stage	Uzbekistan	1–2	Loss	China
1997	Group stage	North Korea	1–14	Loss	China
1997	Group stage	China	0–16	Loss	China
1999	Group stage	Nepal	5–0	Won	Philippines
1999	Group stage	Uzbekistan	0–1	Loss	Philippines
1999	Group stage	Japan	0–6	Loss	Philippines
1999	Group stage	Thailand	0–1	Loss	Philippines
2001	Group stage	Uzbekistan	0–5	Loss	(Chinese Taipei) New Taipei City, Taiwan
2001	Group stage	Hong Kong	1–2	Loss	(Chinese Taipei) New Taipei City, Taiwan
2001	Group stage	China	0–10	Loss	(Chinese Taipei) New Taipei City, Taiwan
2003	Group stage	Japan	0–15	Loss	Nakhon Sawan, Thailand
2003	Group stage	Myanmar	0–6	Loss	Nakhon Sawan, Thailand
2003	Group stage	Chinese Taipei	0–4	Loss	Nakhon Sawan, Thailand
2003	Group stage	Guam	2–1	Won	Nakhon Sawan, Thailand
2006	Qualification	Vietnam	1–6	Loss	Hanoi, Vietnam
2006	Qualification	Myanmar	1–4	Loss	Hanoi, Vietnam
2008	Qualification	Hong Kong	3–2	Won	Hong Kong
2008	Qualification	Hong Kong	1–1	Draw	Hong Kong
2008	Qualification	South Korea	0–4	Loss	Thailand
2008	Qualification	Thailand	0–9	Loss	Thailand
2008	Qualification	Malaysia	0–0	Draw	Thailand
2014	Qualification	Iran	6–0	Won	Bangladesh
2014	Qualification	Thailand	0–1	Loss	Bangladesh
2014	Qualification	Bangladesh	4–0	Won	Bangladesh
2018	Qualification	United Arab Emirates	4–0	Won	Tajikistan
2018	Qualification	Iraq	4–0	Won	Tajikistan
2018	Qualification	Tajikistan	8–0	Won	Tajikistan
2018	Qualification	Thailand	1–1	Draw	Tajikistan
2018	Qualification	Jordan	1–5	Loss	Tajikistan
2018	Group stage	Jordan	2–1	Won	Jordan
2018	Group stage	China	0–3	Loss	Jordan
2018	Group stage	Thailand	1–3	Loss	Jordan
2018	Fifth place match	South Korea	0–5	Loss	Jordan
2022	Qualification	Nepal	2–1	Won	Uzbekistan
2022	Qualification	Hong Kong	2–1	Won	Uzbekistan
2022	Group stage	Thailand	1–0	Won	Pune, India
2022	Group stage	Australia	0–4	Loss	Pune, India
2022	Group stage	Indonesia	6–0	Won	Pune, India
2022	Quarterfinals	Chinese Taipei	1(4)–1(3)	Draw	Pune, India
2022	Semifinals	South Korea	0–2	Loss	Pune, India

*Draws include knockout matches decided on penalty kicks.

=== Asian Games ===
Champions Runners up Third place Fourth place

The Philippines made their debut in the women's football tournament of the Asian Games in the 2022 edition.

Asian Games record
Hosts / Year	Result	Position	GP	W	D*	L	GS	GA	GD
(China) 1990	Did not enter								
(Japan) 1994	Did not enter								
1998	Did not enter								
(South Korea) 2002	Did not enter								
(Qatar) 2006	Did not enter								
(China) 2010	Did not enter								
(South Korea) 2014	Did not enter								
(Indonesia) 2018	Did not enter								
(China) 2022	Quarter-finals	7th place	4	2	0	2	8	14	–6
(Japan) 2026	Quarter-finals	8th place	4	1	1	2	4	10	–6
Total	2/10	–	8	3	1	4	12	24	–12

=== ASEAN Women's Championship ===
Champions Runners up Third place Fourth place

ASEAN Women's Championship record
Year	Result	Position	GP	W	D*	L	GF	GA	GD
(Vietnam) 2004	Group stage	6th	3	1	0	2	2	7	−5
(Vietnam) 2006	Did not enter								
(Myanmar) 2007	Group stage	7th	3	0	0	3	3	14	−11
(Vietnam) 2008	Group stage	7th	3	1	0	2	3	20	−17
(Laos) 2011	Group stage	6th	3	0	1	2	3	9	−6
(Vietnam) 2012	Group stage	5th	3	1	0	2	9	9	0
(Myanmar) 2013	Group stage	6th	4	2	0	2	15	11	+4
(Vietnam) 2015	Group stage	5th	3	1	0	2	4	8	−4
(Myanmar) 2016	Group stage	6th	3	1	0	2	2	8	−6
(Indonesia) 2018	Group stage	6th	4	1	1	2	6	12	−6
(Thailand) 2019	Fourth place	4th	6	3	0	3	17	9	+8
(Philippines) 2022	Champions	1st	7	6	0	1	23	2	+21
(Vietnam) 2025	Group stage	5th	3	1	1	1	8	2	6
Total	12/13	−	45	18	3	24	95	111	−16

ASEAN Women's Championship history
Season	Round	Opponent	Scores	Result	Venue
(Vietnam) 2004	Group stage	Indonesia	0–1	Loss	Vietnam
(Vietnam) 2004	Group stage	Singapore	2–1	Won	Vietnam
(Vietnam) 2004	Group stage	Vietnam	0–5	Loss	Vietnam
(Myanmar) 2007	Group stage	Vietnam	0–9	Loss	Yangon, Myanmar
(Myanmar) 2007	Group stage	Indonesia	2–3	Loss	Yangon, Myanmar
(Myanmar) 2007	Group stage	Malaysia	1–2	Loss	Yangon, Myanmar
(Vietnam) 2008	Group stage	Singapore	3–1	Won	Ho Chi Minh City, Vietnam
(Vietnam) 2008	Group stage	Australia	0–7	Loss	Ho Chi Minh City, Vietnam
(Vietnam) 2008	Group stage	Malaysia	0–12	Loss	Ho Chi Minh City, Vietnam
(Laos) 2011	Group stage	Myanmar	0–2	Loss	Vientiane, Laos
(Laos) 2011	Group stage	Thailand	1–5	Loss	Vientiane, Laos
(Laos) 2011	Group stage	Malaysia	2–2	Draw	Vientiane, Laos
(Vietnam) 2012	Group stage	Myanmar	0–3	Loss	Ho Chi Minh City, Vietnam
(Vietnam) 2012	Group stage	Vietnam	2–4	Loss	Ho Chi Minh City, Vietnam
(Vietnam) 2012	Group stage	Singapore	7–2	Won	Ho Chi Minh City, Vietnam
(Myanmar) 2013	Group stage	Indonesia	6–0	Won	Yangon, Myanmar
(Myanmar) 2013	Group stage	Japan U23	1–4	Loss	Yangon, Myanmar
(Myanmar) 2013	Group stage	Myanmar	1–5	Loss	Yangon, Myanmar
(Myanmar) 2013	Group stage	Laos	7–2	Won	Yangon, Myanmar
(Vietnam) 2015	Group stage	Malaysia	3–0	Won	Ho Chi Minh City, Vietnam
(Vietnam) 2015	Group stage	Myanmar	1–4	Loss	Ho Chi Minh City, Vietnam
(Vietnam) 2015	Group stage	Vietnam	0–4	Loss	Ho Chi Minh City, Vietnam
(Myanmar) 2016	Group stage	Thailand	0–4	Loss	Mandalay, Myanmar
(Myanmar) 2016	Group stage	Vietnam	0–4	Loss	Mandalay, Myanmar
(Myanmar) 2016	Group stage	Singapore	2–0	Won	Mandalay, Myanmar
(Indonesia) 2018	Group stage	Myanmar	0–4	Loss	Palembang, Indonesia
(Indonesia) 2018	Group stage	Singapore	3–0	Won	Palembang, Indonesia
(Indonesia) 2018	Group stage	Vietnam	0–5	Loss	Palembang, Indonesia
(Indonesia) 2018	Group stage	Indonesia	3–3	Draw	Palembang, Indonesia
(Thailand) 2019	Group stage	Malaysia	3–0	Won	Chonburi, Thailand
(Thailand) 2019	Group stage	Timor-Leste	7–0	Won	Chonburi, Thailand
(Thailand) 2019	Group stage	Thailand	2–4	Loss	Chonburi, Thailand
(Thailand) 2019	Group stage	Singapore	4–0	Won	Chonburi, Thailand
(Thailand) 2019	Semifinals	Vietnam	1–2	Loss	Chonburi, Thailand
(Thailand) 2019	Third place match	Myanmar	0–3	Loss	Chonburi, Thailand
(Philippines) 2022	Group stage	Australia U23	1–0	Won	Manila, Philippines
(Philippines) 2022	Group stage	Singapore	7–0	Won	Manila, Philippines
(Philippines) 2022	Group stage	Malaysia	4–0	Won	Manila, Philippines
(Philippines) 2022	Group stage	Indonesia	4–1	Won	Manila, Philippines
(Philippines) 2022	Group stage	Thailand	0–1	Loss	Manila, Philippines
(Philippines) 2022	Semifinals	Vietnam	4–0	Won	Manila, Philippines
(Philippines) 2022	Finals	Thailand	3–0	Won	Manila, Philippines
(Vietnam) 2025	Group stage	Timor-Leste	7–0	Won	Vietnam
(Vietnam) 2025	Group stage	Australia U23	0–1	Loss	Vietnam
(Vietnam) 2025	Group stage	Myanmar	1–1	Draw	Vietnam

=== SEA Games ===
Champions Runners up Third place Fourth place

Southeast Asian Games record
Year	Result	Position	GP	W	D*	L	GF	GA	GD
(Thailand) 1985	Bronze medal	3rd	2	0	0	2	0	6	−6
(Thailand) 1995	Fourth place	4th	4	1	2	1	3	9	−6
(Indonesia) 1997	Group stage	6th	2	0	0	2	0	3	−3
(Malaysia) 2001	Group stage	6th	3	0	0	3	0	6	−6
(Vietnam) 2003	Group stage	5th	3	0	2	1	1	4	−3
(Philippines) 2005	Fourth place	4th	4	1	0	3	4	9	−5
(Thailand) 2007	Group stage	5th	2	0	1	1	2	12	−10
(Laos) 2009	Did not enter								
(Myanmar) 2013	Group stage	6th	2	0	0	2	0	9	−9
(Malaysia) 2017	Fourth place	4th	4	1	0	3	3	13	−10
(Philippines) 2019	Fourth place	4th	4	1	1	2	6	4	+2
(Vietnam) 2021	Bronze medal	3rd	4	2	0	2	8	6	+2
(Cambodia) 2023	Group stage	5th	3	2	0	1	3	2	+1
(Thailand) 2025	Gold medal	1st	5	2	2	1	9	3	+6
Total	13/14	−	42	10	8	24	36	86	−50

Southeast Asian Games history
Season	Round	Opponent	Scores	Result	Venue
1985	Round robin	Thailand	4–0	Loss	Bangkok, Thailand
1985	Round robin	Singapore	2–0	Loss	Bangkok, Thailand
1995	Round robin	Singapore	1–2	Won	Chiang Mai, Thailand
1995	Round robin	Myanmar	1–1	Draw	Chiang Mai, Thailand
1995	Round robin	Thailand	7–0	Loss	Chiang Mai, Thailand
1995	Round robin	Malaysia	0–0	Draw	Chiang Mai, Thailand
1997	Group stage	Thailand	1–0	Loss	Jakarta, Indonesia
1997	Group stage	Vietnam	2–0	Loss	Jakarta, Indonesia
2001	Group stage	Thailand	4–0	Loss	Kuala Lumpur, Malaysia
2001	Group stage	Myanmar	1–0	Loss	Kuala Lumpur, Malaysia
2001	Group stage	Malaysia	1–0	Loss	Kuala Lumpur, Malaysia
2003	Group stage	Malaysia	0–0	Draw	Hai Phong, Vietnam
2003	Group stage	Indonesia	1–1	Draw	Hai Phong, Vietnam
2003	Group stage	Vietnam	3–0	Loss	Hai Phong, Vietnam
2005	Group stage	Thailand	0–1	Loss	Marikina, Philippines
2005	Group stage	Indonesia	2–0	Won	Marikina, Philippines
2005	Group stage	Vietnam	5–0	Loss	Marikina, Philippines
2005	Group stage	Myanmar	3–1	Loss	Marikina, Philippines
2007	Group stage	Vietnam	10–0	Loss	Nakhon Ratchasima, Thailand
2007	Group stage	Laos	2–2	Draw	Nakhon Ratchasima, Thailand
2013	Group stage	Vietnam	7–0	Loss	Mandalay, Myanmar
2013	Group stage	Myanmar	2–0	Loss	Mandalay, Myanmar
2017	Group stage	Malaysia	1–2	Won	Shah Alam, Malaysia
2017	Group stage	Vietnam	3–0	Loss	Shah Alam, Malaysia
2017	Group stage	Myanmar	6–0	Loss	Shah Alam, Malaysia
2017	Group stage	Thailand	3–1	Loss	Shah Alam, Malaysia
2019	Group stage	Myanmar	0–0	Draw	Biñan, Philippines
2019	Group stage	Malaysia	5–0	Won	Biñan, Philippines
2019	Semi-finals	Vietnam	2–0	Loss	Biñan, Philippines
2019	Bronze medal match	Myanmar	2–1	Loss	Manila, Philippines
2021	Group stage	Vietnam	2–1	Loss	Cẩm Phả, Vietnam
2021	Group stage	Cambodia	5–0	Won	Cẩm Phả, Vietnam
2021	Semi-finals	Thailand	3–0	Loss	Cẩm Phả, Vietnam
2021	Bronze medal match	Myanmar	1–2	Won	Cẩm Phả, Vietnam
2023	Group stage	Myanmar	0–1	Loss	Phnom Penh, Cambodia
2023	Group stage	Malaysia	0–1	Won	Phnom Penh, Cambodia
2023	Group stage	Vietnam	1–2	Won	Phnom Penh, Cambodia
2025	Group stage	Myanmar	1–2	Loss	Chonburi, Thailand
2025	Group stage	Vietnam	0–1	Won	Chonburi, Thailand
2025	Group stage	Malaysia	6–0	Won	Chonburi, Thailand
2025	Semi-finals	Thailand	1–1 (4–2)	Draw	Chonburi, Thailand
2025	Finals	Vietnam	0–0 (6–5)	Draw	Chonburi, Thailand

=== Minor tournaments ===
Minor tournaments record
Tournament	Result	GP	W	D*	L	GF	GA	GD
(China) 1989 Xiamen Women's Tournament	6/6	5	0	0	5	0	33	−33
(Philippines) 2001 PFF Women's Invitational Championships	1/5	4	3	1	0	24	3	+21
(Malaysia) 2003 Women Four Nations Tournament	2/4	3	2	0	1	10	4	+6
(United States) 2012 LA Vikings Cup	1/4	4	2	2	0	13	5	+8
(Spain) 2023 Pinatar Cup	4/4	3	0	0	3	1	8	−7
(Spain) 2024 Pinatar Cup	4/4	2	0	0	2	0	3	−3

*Draws include knockout matches decided on penalty kicks.

== Honors ==
=== Competitions ===
- ASEAN Women's Championship

Champions: 2022

- South East Asian Games

Gold medalists: 2025
Bronze medalists: 1985, 2021

=== Awards ===
PSA Annual Awards

- Golden Lady Booters' Special Award: 2024 (Note: For their first-ever qualification and participation in the 2023 FIFA Women's World Cup.)

PSC Women in Sports Awards

- Team of the year: 2024

== See also ==
- Women's association football around the world
- Sport in the Philippines
  - Football in the Philippines
    - Women's football in the Philippines
- Philippines women's national under-20 football team
- Philippines women's national under-17 football team
- Philippines women's national futsal team
