= China women's national football team results (2010–2019) =

This article lists the results for the China women's national football team between 2010 and 2019.

Key
Win
Draw
Defeat

== 2010 ==
13 January 2010 Friendly	China	1–0	Norway
18:00 UTC+1		Report

15 January 2010 Friendly	China	2–2	England
		Report

16 January 2010 Friendly	China	3–1	Norway
		Report

6 February 2010 2010 EAFF Women's Football Championship	Japan	2–0	China	Ajinomoto Stadium, Tokyo
15:30 UTC+9	Miyama 19'; Kinga 61'	Report		Attendance: 7,459

10 February 2010 2010 EAFF Women's Football Championship	China	2–1	South Korea	Ajinomoto Stadium, Tokyo
16:30 UTC+9	Ma Xiaoxu 51'; Yuan Fan 63'	Report	Ji So-yun 85'	Attendance: 714

13 February 2010 2010 EAFF Women's Football Championship	Chinese Taipei	0–3	China	Ajinomoto Stadium, Tokyo
13:00 UTC+9		Report	Han Duan 46', 60'; Pang Fengyue 75'	Attendance: 728

24 February 2010 2010 Algarve Cup	China	1–1	Finland	Municipal Stadium, Lagos
15:00 UTC±0

26 February 2010 2010 Algarve Cup	Denmark	0–2	China	Municipal Stadium, Lagos
15:00 UTC±0

1 March 2010 2010 Algarve Cup	China	0–5	Germany	Estádio Algarve, Algarve
17:00 UTC±0

3 March 2010 2010 Algarve Cup	China	0–2	Sweden	Albufeira Municipal Stadium, Albufeira
11:00 UTC±0

21 April 2010 Friendly	China	2–1	Canada	Yongchuan Sports Center, Chongqing
15:30 UTC+8		Report

24 April 2010 Friendly	China	2–0	Canada	Yongchuan Sports Center, Chongqing
19:30 UTC+8		Report

19 May 2010 2010 AFC Women's Asian Cup	China	0–0	South Korea	Chengdu Sports Centre, Chengdu
19:30 UTC+8

21 May 2010 2010 AFC Women's Asian Cup	Vietnam	0–5	China	Shuangliu Sports Centre, Chengdu
19:30 UTC+8

23 May 2010 2010 AFC Women's Asian Cup	China	1–0	Australia	Chengdu Sports Centre, Chengdu
16:00 UTC+8

27 May 2010 2010 AFC Women's Asian Cup	China	0–1 (a.e.t.)	North Korea	Chengdu Sports Centre, Chengdu
19:30 UTC+8

30 May 2010 2010 AFC Women's Asian Cup	Japan	2–0	China	Chengdu Sports Centre, Chengdu
16:00 UTC+8

26 September 2010 Friendly	Canada	1–1	China	Toronto
		Report

30 September 2010 Friendly	Canada	3–1	China	BMO Field, Toronto
		Report

2 October 2010 Friendly	United States	2–1	China	KSU Soccer Stadium, Kennesaw
18:00 UTC−4		Report

6 October 2010 Friendly	United States	1–1	China	PPL Park, Chester
19:00 UTC−4		Report

14 November 2010 2010 Asian Games	China	10–1	Jordan	Guangzhou Higher Education Mega Center Central Stadium, Guangzhou
19:00 UTC+8

16 November 2010 2010 Asian Games	China	1–0	Vietnam	Guangzhou Higher Education Mega Center Central Stadium, Guangzhou
19:00 UTC+8

18 November 2010 2010 Asian Games	China	0–0 (7–8 p)	South Korea	Guangzhou Higher Education Mega Center Central Stadium, Guangzhou
19:00 UTC+8
	Penalties
	Zhang Yue (penalty scored); Weng Xinzhi (penalty scored); Xu Yuan (penalty scored); Pang Fengyue (penalty missed); Liu Huana (penalty scored); Yuan Fan (penalty scored); Wang Yihang (penalty scored); Zhou Gaoping (penalty scored); Qu Shanshan (penalty missed)		(penalty scored) Kim Do-yeon; (penalty scored) Kim Na-rae; (penalty scored) Jeon Ga-eul; (penalty missed) Yu Ji-eun; (penalty scored) Ji So-yun; (penalty scored) Lee Eun-mi; (penalty scored) Kwon Hah-nul; (penalty scored) Hong Kyung-suk; (penalty scored) Yoo Young-a

20 November 2010 2010 Asian Games	Japan	1–0 (a.e.t.)	China	Yuexiushan Stadium, Guangzhou
16:00 UTC+8

22 November 2010 2010 Asian Games	South Korea	2–0	China	Tianhe Stadium, Guangzhou
15:30 UTC+8

== 2011 ==
21 January 2011 2011 Yongchuan Four Nations Tournament	China	2–3	Canada	Yongchuan Sports Center, Chongqing
18:35 UTC+8

23 January 2011 2011 Yongchuan Four Nations Tournament	China	2–1	Sweden	Yongchuan Sports Center, Chongqing
16:00 UTC+8

25 January 2011 2011 Yongchuan Four Nations Tournament	China	0–2	United States	Yongchuan Sports Center, Chongqing
18:35 UTC+8

2 March 2011 2011 Algarve Cup	China	0–1	Denmark	Desportivo da Nora Park, Ferreiras
15:00 UTC±0

4 March 2011 2011 Algarve Cup	Iceland	2–1	China	Albufeira Municipal Stadium, Albufeira
15:00 UTC±0

7 March 2011 2011 Algarve Cup	China	0–1	Sweden	Estádio José Arcanjo, Olhão
15:00 UTC±0

9 March 2011 2011 Algarve Cup	China	2–1	Wales	Albufeira Municipal Stadium, Albufeira
11:00 UTC±0

17 April 2011 Friendly	China	0–1	North Korea	Qingdao Tiantai Stadium, Qingdao
15:00 UTC+8

19 April 2011 Friendly	China	2–0	North Korea	Qingdao Tiantai Stadium, Qingdao
15:00 UTC+8

18 May 2011 Friendly	China	3–0	New Zealand	Weifang Sports Center Stadium, Weifang
15:30 UTC+8

20 May 2011 Friendly	China	1–0	New Zealand	Weifang Sports Center Stadium, Weifang
19:35 UTC+8

22 July 2011 Friendly	China	2–0	Russia	Changchun Stadium, Changchun

26 July 2011 Friendly	China	2–2	Russia	Changchun Stadium, Changchun

22 August 2011 Friendly	China	1–1	Netherlands	Hohhot City Stadium, Hohhot
19:35 UTC+8

24 August 2011 Friendly	China	0–1	Netherlands	Hohhot City Stadium, Hohhot
19:30 UTC+8

1 September 2011 Women's Olympic Qualifying Tournament	China	0–0	South Korea	Jinan Olympic Sports Center, Jinan
19:00 UTC+8

3 September 2011 Women's Olympic Qualifying Tournament	China	0–0	North Korea	Shandong Provincial Stadium, Jinan
19:00 UTC+8

5 September 2011 Women's Olympic Qualifying Tournament	Thailand	0–2	China	Shandong Provincial Stadium, Jinan
19:00 UTC+8

8 September 2011 Women's Olympic Qualifying Tournament	Australia	1–0	China	Jinan Olympic Sports Center, Jinan
19:00 UTC+8

11 September 2011 Women's Olympic Qualifying Tournament	Japan	1–0	China	Jinan Olympic Sports Center, Jinan
19:00 UTC+8

== 2012 ==
15 February 2012 2012 Yongchuan Four Nations Tournament	China	1–0	Mexico	Yongchuan Sports Center, Chongqing
15:00 UTC+8

17 February 2012 2012 Yongchuan Four Nations Tournament	China	0–0	South Korea	Yongchuan Sports Center, Chongqing
15:00 UTC+8

19 February 2012 2012 Yongchuan Four Nations Tournament	China	0–0	North Korea	Yongchuan Sports Center, Chongqing
14:00 UTC+8

29 February 2012 2012 Algarve Cup	Sweden	1–0	China	Estádio Municipal, Vila Real de Santo António
15:00 UTC±0

2 March 2012 2012 Algarve Cup	Germany	1–0	China	Estádio Municipal, Vila Real de Santo António
15:00 UTC±0

5 March 2012 2012 Algarve Cup	China	0–1	Iceland	Estádio Municipal, Lagos
15:30 UTC±0

7 March 2012 2012 Algarve Cup	Portugal	0–1	China	Estádio Algarve, Algarve
10:15 UTC±0

27 May 2012 Friendly	United States	4–1	China	PPL Park, Chester
19:00 UTC−4

30 May 2012 Friendly	Canada	1–0	China	Moncton Stadium, Moncton
		Report		Attendance: 7,514

17 June 2012 Friendly	New Zealand	3–1	China	Centre Park, Mangere

20 June 2012 Friendly	New Zealand	1–0	China	North Harbour Stadium, Auckland
				Attendance: 1,865

20 November 2012 2013 EAFF Women's East Asian Cup Qualification	China	6–0	Hong Kong	Shenzhen Stadium, Shenzhen
19:45 UTC+8	Ma Xiaoxu 36' (pen.), 64'; Pu Wei 77'; Wang Chen 81', 90+1'; Wang Shanshan 84'	Report		Attendance: 1,898

22 November 2012 2013 EAFF Women's East Asian Cup Qualification	Chinese Taipei	0–2	China	Shenzhen Stadium, Shenzhen
19:45 UTC+8		Report	Zhang Rui 53'; Wang Shanshan 66'	Attendance: 1,563

24 November 2012 2013 EAFF Women's East Asian Cup Qualification	China	2–1	Australia	Shenzhen Stadium, Shenzhen
15:45 UTC+8	Wang Lisi 9'; Zhang Rui 50'	Report	Gill 12'	Attendance: 6,333

8 December 2012 Friendly	United States	2–0	China	Ford Field, Detroit
13:30 UTC−5

12 December 2012 Friendly	United States	4–0	China	BBVA Compass Stadium, Houston
				Attendance: 15,643

15 December 2012 Friendly	United States	4–1	China	FAU Stadium, Boca Raton

== 2013 ==
12 January 2013 2013 Yongchuan Four Nations Tournament	China	0–1	Canada	Yongchuan Sports Center, Chongqing
14:00 UTC+8

14 January 2013 2013 Yongchuan Four Nations Tournament	China	0–1	Norway	Yongchuan Sports Center, Chongqing
16:00 UTC+8

16 January 2013 2013 Yongchuan Four Nations Tournament	China	2–0	South Korea	Yongchuan Sports Center, Chongqing
14:00 UTC+8

6 March 2013 2013 Algarve Cup	Sweden	1–1	China	Stadium Bela Vista, Parchal
16:00 UTC±0	Thunebro 59'		Ren Guixin 32'	Attendance: 150

8 March 2013 2013 Algarve Cup	United States	5–0	China	Albufeira Municipal Stadium, Albufeira
14:00 UTC±0	Leroux 13'; Krieger 33'; Rapinoe 46'; Press 64'; Engen 83'			Attendance: 500

11 March 2013 2013 Algarve Cup	China	1–0	Iceland	Sports Complex Nora, Ferreiras
15:00 UTC±0	Zeng Ying 63'

13 March 2013 2013 Algarve Cup	Japan	1–0	China	Estádio Algarve, Algarve
13:10 UTC±0	Ōgimi 67'

20 July 2013 2013 EAFF Women's East Asian Cup	Japan	2–0	China	Seoul World Cup Stadium, Seoul
16:15 UTC+9	Ando 35'; Nakajima 57'

24 July 2013 2013 EAFF Women's East Asian Cup	South Korea	1–2	China	Hwaseong Stadium, Hwaseong
17:15 UTC+9	Kim Na-rae 8'		Wang Lisi 1'; Li Ying 66'	Attendance: 2,850

27 July 2013 2013 EAFF Women's East Asian Cup	North Korea	1–0	China	Jamsil Olympic Stadium, Seoul
17:15 UTC+9	Ri Un-hyang 2'			Attendance: 935

22 September 2013 2013 Valais Women's Cup	China	1–0	Mexico	Stade du Lussy, Châtel-Saint-Denis
13:30	Wang Lingling 66'

25 September 2013 2013 Valais Women's Cup	China	0–4	New Zealand	Stade St-Germain, Savièse
17:30			Wilkinson 53'; Hearn 64', 87'; White 82'

24 November 2013 Friendly	Australia	2–0	China

27 November 2013 Friendly	Australia	2–1	China

== 2014 ==
12 January 2014 Friendly	China	4–0	Hong Kong	Huangpu Sports Center, Guangzhou
14:00 UTC+8

11 February 2014 2014 Yongchuan Four Nations Tournament	China	1–0	New Zealand	Yongchuan Sports Center, Chongqing
14:00 UTC+8

13 February 2014 2014 Yongchuan Four Nations Tournament	China	3–1	Mexico	Yongchuan Sports Center, Chongqing
14:00 UTC+8

15 February 2014 2014 Yongchuan Four Nations Tournament	China	1–0	North Korea	Yongchuan Sports Center, Chongqing
14:00 UTC+8

5 March 2014 2014 Algarve Cup	Norway	0–1	China	Estádio Municipal, Vila Real de Santo António
16:00 UTC±0

7 March 2014 2014 Algarve Cup	Germany	1–0	China	Albufeira Municipal Stadium, Albufeira
17:10 UTC±0

10 March 2014 2014 Algarve Cup	China	0–1	Iceland	Estádio Municipal, Lagos
18:30 UTC±0

10 March 2014 2014 Algarve Cup	China	1–1 (5–4 p)	Denmark	Albufeira Municipal Stadium, Albufeira
18:30 UTC±0

6 April 2014 Friendly	United States	2–0	China	Dick's Sporting Goods Park, Commerce City
				Attendance: 14,903

10 April 2014 Friendly	United States	3–0	China	SDCCU Stadium, San Diego

5 May 2014 Friendly	China	6–0	Hong Kong	Huangpu Sports Center, Guangzhou

9 May 2014 Friendly	China	4–0	Chinese Taipei	Huangpu Sports Center, Guangzhou

15 May 2014 2014 AFC Women's Asian Cup	China	7–0	Thailand	Thống Nhất Stadium, Ho Chi Minh City
20:15 UTC+7

17 May 2014 2014 AFC Women's Asian Cup	Myanmar	0–3	China	Thống Nhất Stadium, Ho Chi Minh City
17:15 UTC+7

19 May 2014 2014 AFC Women's Asian Cup	South Korea	0–0	China	Thống Nhất Stadium, Ho Chi Minh City
19:15 UTC+7

22 May 2014 2014 AFC Women's Asian Cup	Japan	2–1 (a.e.t.)	China	Thống Nhất Stadium, Ho Chi Minh City
17:15 UTC+7

25 May 2014 2014 AFC Women's Asian Cup	China	2–1	South Korea	Thống Nhất Stadium, Ho Chi Minh City
16:45 UTC+7

5 September 2014 Friendly	China	5–0	Vietnam	Beijing Olympic Sports Centre, Beijing
19:00 UTC+8

9 September 2014 Friendly	China	2–2	Thailand	Beijing Olympic Sports Centre, Beijing
19:00 UTC+8

15 September 2014 2014 Asian Games	Japan	0–0	China	Incheon Namdong Asiad Rugby Field, Incheon
20:00 UTC+9

18 September 2014 2014 Asian Games	China	4–0	Chinese Taipei	Incheon Namdong Asiad Rugby Field, Incheon
14:00 UTC+9

22 September 2014 2014 Asian Games	China	5–0	Jordan	Incheon Namdong Asiad Rugby Field, Incheon
20:00 UTC+9

26 September 2014 2014 Asian Games	North Korea	1–0	China	Ansan Wa~ Stadium, Ansan
16:00 UTC+9

10 December 2014 2014 International Women's Football Tournament of Brasília	United States	1–1	China	Estádio Nacional Mané Garrincha, Brasília
19:20 UTC−2	Lloyd 23'		Han Peng 67'	Attendance: 1,601

14 December 2014 2014 International Women's Football Tournament of Brasília	Argentina	0–6	China	Estádio Nacional Mané Garrincha, Brasília
16:00 UTC−2			Wang Shuang 49'; Tang Jiali 52'; Gu Yasha 64'; Zhang Rui 85', 88', 90'	Attendance: 2,710

18 December 2014 2014 International Women's Football Tournament of Brasília	Brazil	4–1	China	Estádio Nacional Mané Garrincha, Brasília
21:50 UTC−2	Darlene 13'; Andressinha 25'; Debinha 60'; Andressa 64' (pen.)		Ren Guixin 90+3'	Attendance: 1,718

21 December 2014 2014 International Women's Football Tournament of Brasília	China	0–0	Argentina	Estádio Nacional Mané Garrincha, Brasília
16:00 UTC−2

== 2015 ==
11 January 2015 2015 Shenzhen Four Nations Tournament	China	0–0	Mexico	Shenzhen Universiade Sports Centre, Shenzhen
19:30 UTC+8

13 January 2015 2015 Shenzhen Four Nations Tournament	South Korea	3–2	China	Shenzhen Universiade Sports Centre, Shenzhen
19:30 UTC+8

15 January 2015 2015 Shenzhen Four Nations Tournament	China	1–2	Canada	Shenzhen Universiade Sports Centre, Shenzhen
19:30 UTC+8

4 March 2015 2015 Algarve Cup	Brazil	0–0	China	Albufeira Municipal Stadium, Albufeira
15:00

6 March 2015 2015 Algarve Cup	Germany	2–0	China	Estádio Municipal, Vila Real de Santo António
13:00	Mittag 40'; Popp 76'

9 March 2015 2015 Algarve Cup	Sweden	3–0	China	Estádio Municipal, Vila Real de Santo António
17:30	Asllani 4'; Schelin 33' (pen.); Jakobsson 40'

11 March 2015 2015 Algarve Cup	Portugal	3–3 (8–7 p)	China	Stadium Bela Vista, Parchal
15:00	Rodrigues 29'; Luís 38'; Silva 89' (pen.)		Xu Yanlu 3'; Wang Shanshan 27'; Gu Yasha 69'

6 April 2015 Friendly	England	1–3	China

9 April 2015 Friendly	England	2–1	China	Academy Stadium, Manchester
19:30 UTC+1

6 June 2015 2015 FIFA Women's World Cup	Canada	1–0	China	Commonwealth Stadium, Edmonton
16:00 UTC−6	Sinclair 90+2' (pen.)	Report		Attendance: 53,058

11 June 2015 2015 FIFA Women's World Cup	China	1–0	Netherlands	Commonwealth Stadium, Edmonton
16:00 UTC−6	Wang Lisi 90+1'	Report		Attendance: 35,544

15 June 2015 2015 FIFA Women's World Cup	China	2–2	New Zealand	Winnipeg Stadium, Winnipeg
18:30 UTC−5	Wang Lisi 41' (pen.); Wang Shanshan 60'	Report	Stott 28'; Wilkinson 64'	Attendance: 26,191

20 June 2015 2015 FIFA Women's World Cup	China	1–0	Cameroon	Commonwealth Stadium, Edmonton
17:30 UTC−6	Wang Shanshan 12'	Report		Attendance: 15,958

26 June 2015 2015 FIFA Women's World Cup	China	0–1	United States	Lansdowne Stadium, Ottawa
19:30 UTC−4		Report	Lloyd 51'	Attendance: 24,141

1 August 2015 2015 EAFF Women's East Asian Cup	China	0–1	South Korea	Wuhan Sports Center Stadium, Wuhan
21:00 UTC+8

4 August 2015 2015 EAFF Women's East Asian Cup	China	2–3	North Korea	Wuhan Sports Center Stadium, Wuhan
21:00 UTC+8

8 August 2015 2015 EAFF Women's East Asian Cup	China	0–2	Japan	Wuhan Sports Center Stadium, Wuhan
20:10 UTC+8

18 September 2015 Friendly	China	1–3	Spain	Weinan Sports Center Stadium, Weinan
19:30 UTC+8

21 September 2015 Friendly	China	1–2	Spain	Chenzhou Olympic Sports Centre, Chenzhou
19:35 UTC+8

23 October 2015 2015 Yongchuan International Tournament	China	2–1	England	Yongchuan Sports Center, Chongqing
16:00 UTC+8

25 October 2015 2015 Yongchuan International Tournament	China	1–1	Australia	Yongchuan Sports Center, Chongqing
16:00 UTC+8

3 December 2015 Friendly	China	1–1	Italy	Guiyang Olympic Sports Center, Guiyang
19:35 UTC+8

6 December 2015 Friendly	China	2–0	Italy	Qujing Cultural and Sports Park, Qujing
16:00 UTC+8

13 December 2015 Friendly	United States	2–0	China	University of Phoenix Stadium, Glendale

16 December 2015 Friendly	United States	0–1	China	Mercedes-Benz Superdome, New Orleans

== 2016 ==
21 January 2016 2016 Shenzhen Four Nations Tournament	China	0–0	Mexico	Shenzhen Universiade Sports Centre, Shenzhen
16:00 UTC+8

23 January 2016 2016 Shenzhen Four Nations Tournament	China	8–0	Vietnam	Shenzhen Universiade Sports Centre, Shenzhen
19:30 UTC+8

26 January 2016 2016 Shenzhen Four Nations Tournament	China	2–0	South Korea	Shenzhen Universiade Sports Centre, Shenzhen
16:00 UTC+8

29 February 2016 Women's Olympic Qualifying Tournament	China	2–0	Vietnam	Nagai Stadium, Osaka
16:35 UTC+9

2 March 2016 Women's Olympic Qualifying Tournament	North Korea	1–1	China	Nagai Stadium, Osaka
19:35 UTC+9

4 March 2016 Women's Olympic Qualifying Tournament	Japan	1–2	China	Kincho Stadium, Osaka
19:39 UTC+9

7 March 2016 Women's Olympic Qualifying Tournament	China	1–0	South Korea	Nagai Stadium, Osaka
16:35 UTC+9

9 March 2016 Women's Olympic Qualifying Tournament	Australia	1–1	China	Nagai Stadium, Osaka
19:39 UTC+9

8 April 2016 Friendly	China	2–1	Costa Rica	Shenzhen Universiade Sports Centre, Shenzhen
19:35 UTC+8

11 April 2016 Friendly	China	1–1	Costa Rica	Qujing Cultural and Sports Park, Qujing
19:35 UTC+8

2 June 2016 Friendly	China	6–0	Thailand	Kunshan Stadium, Kunshan
19:35 UTC+8

5 June 2016 Friendly	China	3–0	Thailand	Changzhou Olympic Sports Centre, Changzhou
19:00 UTC+8

16 July 2016 Friendly	France	3–0	China	Stade Sébastien Charléty, Paris
21:00

20 July 2016 Friendly	Canada	1–0	China	Stade Sébastien Charléty, Paris
19:00

29 July 2016 Friendly	Zimbabwe	0–3	China
16:00

3 August 2016 2016 Summer Olympics	Brazil	3–0	China	Estádio Olímpico Nilton Santos, Rio de Janeiro
16:00

6 August 2016 2016 Summer Olympics	South Africa	0–2	China	Estádio Olímpico Nilton Santos, Rio de Janeiro
19:00

9 August 2016 2016 Summer Olympics	China	0–0	Sweden	Estádio Nacional Mané Garrincha, Brasília
22:00

12 August 2016 2016 Summer Olympics	China	0–1	Germany	Itaipava Arena Fonte Nova, Salvador
16:00

20 October 2016 2016 Yongchuan International Tournament	China	2–2	Iceland	Yongchuan Sports Center, Chongqing
19:35 UTC+8

22 October 2016 2016 Yongchuan International Tournament	China	4–1	Uzbekistan	Yongchuan Sports Center, Chongqing
16:00 UTC+8

24 October 2016 2016 Yongchuan International Tournament	Denmark	0–1	China	Yongchuan Sports Center, Chongqing
19:35 UTC+8

== 2017 ==
19 January 2017 2017 Foshan Four Nations Tournament	China	2–0	Thailand	Century Lotus Stadium, Foshan
19:35 UTC+8

21 January 2017 2017 Foshan Four Nations Tournament	China	2–0	Myanmar	Century Lotus Stadium, Foshan
16:00 UTC+8

24 January 2017 2017 Foshan Four Nations Tournament	Ukraine	0–5	China	Century Lotus Stadium, Foshan
19:35 UTC+8

1 March 2017 2017 Algarve Cup	Netherlands	1–0	China	Lagos Municipal Stadium, Lagos
15:00 UTC±0

3 March 2017 2017 Algarve Cup	China	0–0	Sweden	VRS António Sports Complex, Vila Real de Santo António
18:30 UTC±0

6 March 2017 2017 Algarve Cup	China	1–2	Australia	Albufeira Municipal Stadium, Albufeira
15:00 UTC±0

8 March 2017 2017 Algarve Cup	Iceland	2–1	China	Bela Vista Municipal Stadium, Parchal
18:30 UTC±0

6 April 2017 Friendly	China	2–0	Croatia	Kunshan Stadium, Kunshan
16:00 UTC+8

9 April 2017 Friendly	China	2–1	Croatia	Jiaxing Stadium, Jiaxing
16:00 UTC+8

8 June 2017 Friendly	China	0–1	North Korea	Fitness Centre Of Qiannan Stadium, Duyun
19:35 UTC+8

11 June 2017 Friendly	China	4–2	Finland	Changzhou Olympic Sports Centre, Changzhou
16:00 UTC+8

19 October 2017 2017 Yongchuan International Tournament	China	1–2	North Korea	Yongchuan Sports Center, Chongqing
19:35 UTC+8

21 October 2017 2017 Yongchuan International Tournament	Mexico	2–3	China	Yongchuan Sports Center, Chongqing
19:35 UTC+8

24 October 2017 2017 Yongchuan International Tournament	China	2–2	Brazil	Yongchuan Sports Center, Chongqing
19:35 UTC+8

22 November 2017 Friendly	Australia	3–0	China	AAMI Park, Melbourne
19:30 UTC+11				Referee: Esther Staubli (Switzerland)

26 November 2017 Friendly	Australia	5–1	China	Simonds Stadium, Geelong
16:30 UTC+11				Referee: Sandra Strub (Switzerland)

8 December 2017 2017 EAFF E-1 Football Championship	China	0–2	North Korea	Fukuda Denshi Arena, Chiba
16:10 UTC+9		Report	Kim Yun-mi 24', 78'	Referee: Thein Thein Aye (Myanmar)

11 December 2017 2017 EAFF E-1 Football Championship	Japan	1–0	China	Fukuda Denshi Arena, Chiba
18:55 UTC+9

15 December 2017 2017 EAFF E-1 Football Championship	South Korea	1–3	China	Fukuda Denshi Arena, Chiba
16:10 UTC+9

== 2018 ==
19 January 2018 2018 Foshan Four Nations Tournament	China	4–0	Vietnam	Century Lotus Stadium, Foshan
19:35 UTC+8

21 January 2018 2018 Foshan Four Nations Tournament	China	2–1	Thailand	Century Lotus Stadium, Foshan
16:00 UTC+8

23 January 2018 2018 Foshan Four Nations Tournament	Colombia	0–2	China	Century Lotus Stadium, Foshan
19:35 UTC+8

28 February 2018 2018 Algarve Cup	Portugal	2–1	China	Lagos Municipal Stadium, Lagos
15:00 UTC±0

2 March 2018 2018 Algarve Cup	China	0–2	Norway	VRS António Sports Complex, Vila Real de Santo António
15:00 UTC±0

5 March 2018 2018 Algarve Cup	Australia	2–0	China	Albufeira Municipal Stadium, Albufeira
19:00 UTC±0

7 March 2018 2018 Algarve Cup	China	2–1	Russia	VRS António Sports Complex, Vila Real de Santo António
14:00 UTC±0

6 April 2018 2018 AFC Women's Asian Cup	China	4–0	Thailand	Amman International Stadium, Amman
16:45 UTC+3	Song Duan 56', 77'; Wang Shuang 63'; Li Ying 67'	Report		Attendance: 5,060; Referee: Kate Jacewicz (Australia)

9 April 2018 2018 AFC Women's Asian Cup	Philippines	0–3	China	King Abdullah II Stadium, Amman
16:45 UTC+3		Report	Li Ying 17', 57'; Ma Jun 31'	Attendance: 226; Referee: Casey Reibelt (Australia)

12 April 2018 2018 AFC Women's Asian Cup	Jordan	1–8	China	Amman International Stadium, Amman
20:00 UTC+3	Sabbah 17'	Report	Wang Shuang 14', 53', 84'; Khair 41' (o.g.); Song Duan 51'; Li Ying 60', 72' (pen.); Tang Jiali 86'	Referee: Công Thi Dựng (Vietnam)

17 April 2018 2018 AFC Women's Asian Cup	China	1–3	Japan	King Abdullah II Stadium, Amman
20:00 UTC+3	Li Ying 90' (pen.)	Report	Iwabuchi 39'; Yokoyama 85', 88' (pen.)	Attendance: 502; Referee: Ri Hyang-ok (North Korea)

20 April 2018 2018 AFC Women's Asian Cup	China	3–1	Thailand	Amman International Stadium, Amman
16:45 UTC+3	Li Ying 51'; Wang Shanshan 56'; Song Duan 61'	Report	Rattikan 81'	Attendance: 1,026; Referee: Yoshimi Yamashita (Japan)

7 June 2018 Friendly	United States	1–0	China	Rio Tinto Stadium, Sandy
19:00 UTC-6

12 June 2018 Friendly	United States	2–1	China	FirstEnergy Stadium, Cleveland
19:00 UTC-4

17 August 2018 2018 Asian Games	China	7–0	Hong Kong	Gelora Sriwijaya Stadium, Palembang
18:30 UTC+7

20 August 2018 2018 Asian Games	Tajikistan	0–16	China	Gelora Sriwijaya Stadium, Palembang
18:30 UTC+7

22 August 2018 2018 Asian Games	North Korea	0–2	China	Gelora Sriwijaya Stadium, Palembang
18:30 UTC+7

25 August 2018 2018 Asian Games	China	5–0	Thailand	Gelora Sriwijaya Stadium, Palembang
19:30 UTC+7

28 August 2018 2018 Asian Games	Chinese Taipei	0–1	China	Gelora Sriwijaya Stadium, Palembang
19:30 UTC+7

31 August 2018 2018 Asian Games	Japan	1–0	China	Gelora Sriwijaya Stadium, Palembang
18:30 UTC+7

4 October 2018 2018 Yongchuan International Tournament	China	0–0	Portugal	Yongchuan Sports Center, Chongqing
19:35 UTC+8

6 October 2018 2018 Yongchuan International Tournament	Finland	1–2	China	Yongchuan Sports Center, Chongqing
19:35 UTC+8

8 October 2018 2018 Yongchuan International Tournament	China	2–0	Thailand	Yongchuan Sports Center, Chongqing
19:35 UTC+8

1 December 2018 2019 EAFF E-1 Football Championship second preliminary round	China	10–0	Mongolia	Guam Football Association National Training Center, Dededo
15:45 UTC+10

3 December 2018 2019 EAFF E-1 Football Championship second preliminary round	Hong Kong	0–6	China	Guam Football Association National Training Center, Dededo
11:00 UTC+10

5 December 2018 2019 EAFF E-1 Football Championship second preliminary round	China	2–0	Chinese Taipei	Guam Football Association National Training Center, Dededo
15:45 UTC+10

== 2019 ==
17 January 2019 2019 Four Nations Tournament	China	3–0	Nigeria	Wuhua County Olympic Sports Centre, Meizhou
19:35		[]		Referee: Gu Chunhan (China)

20 January 2019 2019 Four Nations Tournament	China	1–0	South Korea	Wuhua County Olympic Sports Centre, Meizhou
19:35		[]		Referee: Qin Liang (China)

1 March 2019 2019 Algarve Cup	China	1–3	Norway	Albufeira Municipal Stadium, Albufeira
13:15		[]		Referee: Lidya Tafasse (Ethiopia)

4 Mar 2019 2019 Algarve Cup	Denmark	1–0	China	VRS António Sports Complex, Vila Real de Santo António
13:15		[]

7 Mar 2019 2019 Algarve Cup	China	1–1	Netherlands	Albufeira Municipal Stadium, Albufeira
17:15		[]

31 May 2019 International Friendly	France	2–1	China	Stade Dominique–Duvauchelle, Créteil
21:00		[]

8 June 2019 2019 FIFA Women's World Cup	Germany	1–0	China	Roazhon Park, Rennes
15:00 UTC+2	Gwinn 66'	[]		Attendance: 15,283; Referee: Marie–Soleil Beaudoin (Canada)

13 June 2019 2019 FIFA Women's World Cup	South Africa	0–1	China	Parc des Princes, Paris
21:00 UTC+2		[]	Li Ying 40'	Attendance: 20,011; Referee: Katalin Kulcsár (Hungary)

17 June 2019 2019 FIFA Women's World Cup	China	0–0	Spain	Stade Océane, Le Havre
18:00 UTC+2		[]		Attendance: 11,814; Referee: Edina Alves Batista (Brazil)

25 June 2019 2019 FIFA Women's World Cup	Italy	2–0	China	Stade de la Mosson, Montpellier
18:00 UTC+2	Giacinti 15'; Galli 49'	[]		Attendance: 17,492; Referee: Edina Alves Batista (Brazil)

7 November 2019 2019 Yongchuan International Tournament	New Zealand	0–2	China	Yongchuan Sports Center, Chongqing
19:35				Referee: Law Bik Chi (Hong Kong)

10 November 2019 2019 Yongchuan International Tournament	Brazil	0–0	China	Yongchuan Sports Center, Chongqing
19:35				Referee: Kim Yu–Jeong (South Korea)

10 December 2019 2019 EAFF E-1 Football Championship Final round	South Korea	0–0	China	Busan Gudeok Stadium, Busan
16:15 UTC+9				Attendance: 1500; Referee: Kate Jacewicz (Australia)

14 December 2019 2019 EAFF E-1 Football Championship Final round	China	0–3	Japan	Busan Gudeok Stadium, Busan
15:55 UTC+9			Iwabuchi 9', 44', 56'	Attendance: 570; Referee: Rebecca Durcau (Australia)

17 December 2019 2019 EAFF E-1 Football Championship Final round	Chinese Taipei	0–1	China	Busan Gudeok Stadium, Busan
16:15 UTC+9			Wu Haiyan 30'	Attendance: 587; Referee: Pansa Chaisanit (Thailand)
