= Yongchuan International Tournament =

- Founded: 2015
- Region: China
- Teams: 4
- Current champions: China (5th title)
- Most championships: China (5 titles)
- 2025 Yongchuan International Tournament

The Yongchuan International Tournament (Chinese: 永川国际女子足球邀请赛) is an invitational women's football tournament, originated in another women's football tournament Four Nations Tournament. It is staged annually in October in Yongchuan District, Chongqing, China.

== History ==
The Four Nations Tournament was held in Guangzhou annually before 2010. When Guangzhou renounced to host the tournament due to celebrating the 2010 Asian Games, Yongchuan District of Chongqing was granted the hosting right by the Chinese Football Association (CFA). The tournament was hosted in Yongchuan between January 2011 and January 2014. In 2015, considering for better preparation for the 2015 FIFA Women's World Cup, CFA moved the tournament to Shenzhen, which was closer to China women's national football team's winter training base in Guangzhou. Yongchuan International Tournament was set as a compensation. England and Australia were invited to the inaugural edition in October 2015.

== Results ==
#	Year	Hosts	Winner	Runners-up	Third place	Teams
1	2015; Details	(China); Chongqing	China	England	Australia	3
2	2016; Details	(China); Chongqing	China	Denmark	Iceland	4
3	2017; Details	(China); Chongqing	Brazil	North Korea	China	4
4	2018; Details	(China); Chongqing	China	Portugal	Finland	4
5	2019; Details	(China); Chongqing	China	Brazil	Canada	4
6	2024; Details	(China); Chongqing	China	Vietnam	Uzbekistan	3
7	2025; Details	(China); Chongqing	China	Thailand	Zambia	4

== Medals ==
Rank	Nation	Gold	Silver	Bronze	Total
1	China (CHN)	6	0	1	7
2	Brazil (BRA)	1	1	0	2
3	England (ENG)	0	1	0	1
4	Iceland (ISL)	0	0	1	1
Totals (4 entries)		7	2	2	11

== Summary (2015-2025) ==
Rank	Team	Part	M	W	D	L	GF	GA	GD	Points
1	China	7	17	11	5	1	37	13	+24	38
2	Brazil	2	5	3	2	0	11	2	+9	11
3	Denmark	1	3	2	0	1	3	3	+1	6
4	North Korea	1	3	2	0	1	3	3	0	6
5	Portugal	1	3	1	2	0	4	1	+3	5
6	Finland	1	3	1	1	1	4	3	+1	4
7	Iceland	1	3	1	1	1	3	3	0	4
8	Vietnam	1	2	1	0	1	2	2	0	3
8	England	1	2	1	0	1	2	2	0	3
10	Canada	1	2	1	0	1	3	4	–1	3
11	Australia	1	2	0	1	1	1	2	–1	1
12	Mexico	1	3	0	0	3	3	7	–4	0
15	Uzbekistan	3	6	0	0	6	3	19	–14	0
13	New Zealand	1	2	0	0	2	0	5	–5	0
14	Thailand	1	3	0	0	3	2	9	–7	0

== Awards ==
Years	Top Goalscorers	Goals	Best players
2015	(China) Wang Shuang	2	(China) Li Dongna
2016	(China) Yang Li	4	(China) Ren Guixin
2017	(Brazil) Marta	4	(China) Wang Shanshan
2018	(Portugal) Carolina Mendes	3	(China) Gu Yasha
2019	(Brazil) Bia Zaneratto	2	(China) Wang Shuang
2024			

== See also ==
- Four Nations Tournament
- Algarve Cup
- Tournament of Nations
- SheBelieves Cup
- Cyprus Women's Cup
- Turkish Women's Cup
- China Cup
- A3 Champions Cup
- Women's International Champions Cup
- MS&AD Cup
- 2025 International Women's Championship
