= Wang Shuang (footballer) =

Chinese footballer (born 1995)

Wang Shuang 王霜
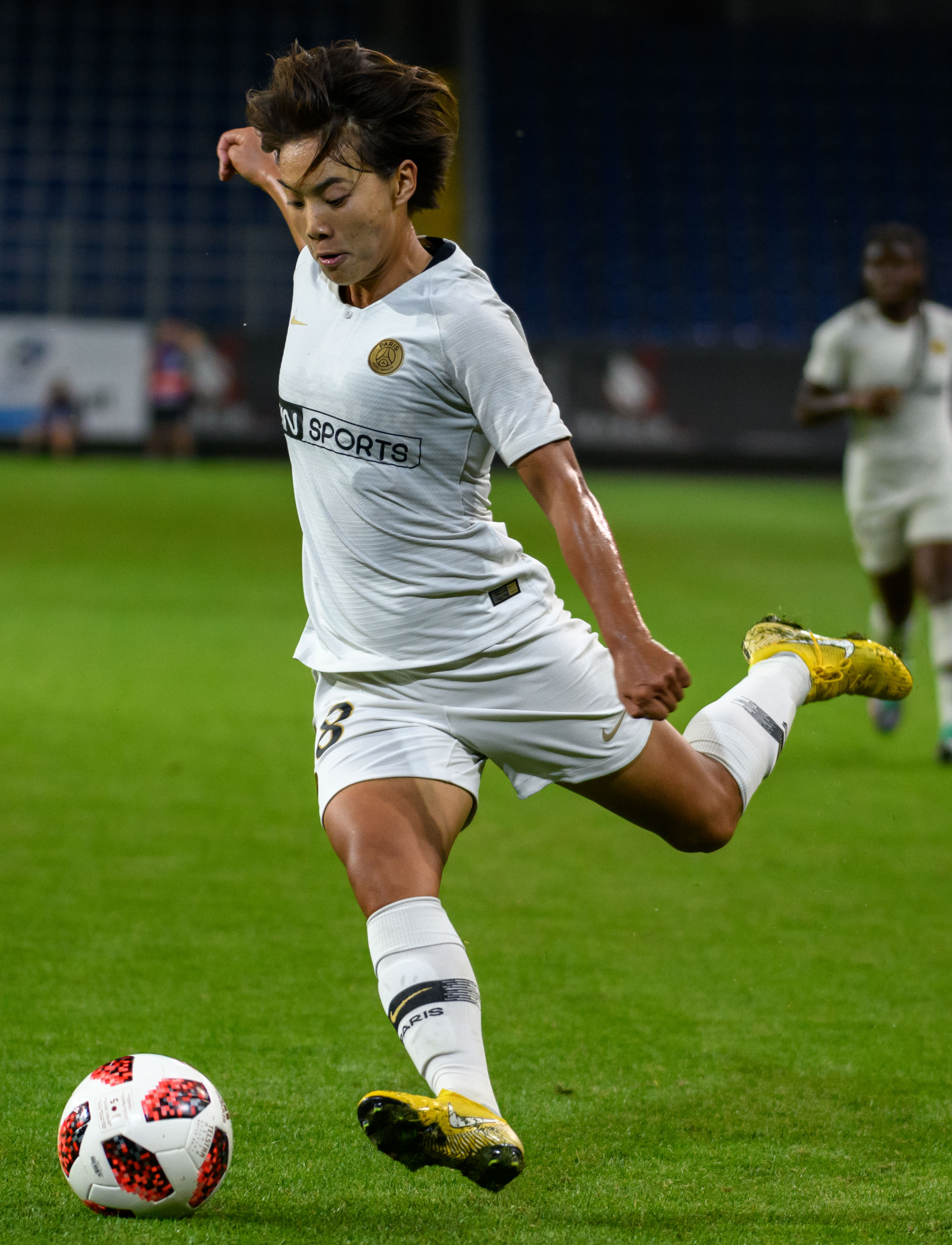
- Wang with Paris Saint-Germain in 2019

Personal information
- Full name: Wang Shuang
- Date of birth: 23 January 1995 (age 31)
- Place of birth: Wuhan, Hubei, China
- Height: 1.64 m (5 ft 5 in)
- Position: Winger

Team information
- Current team: Wuhan Jiangda
- Number: 7

Senior career*
Years	Team	Apps	(Gls)
2012–2013	Wuhan Jianghan University	10	(15)
2013–2014	Daejeon Sportstoto	14	(7)
2015	Wuhan Jianghan University	5	(3)
2016–2017	Dalian Quanjian	19	(9)
2018	Wuhan Jianghan University	8	(7)
2018–2019	Paris Saint-Germain	18	(7)
2019–2022	Wuhan Jianghan University	37	(13)
2022–2023	Racing Louisville	22	(2)
2024–2025	Tottenham Hotspur	6	(0)
2025–	Wuhan Jiangda	4	(1)

International career^{‡}
2012–2014	China U20	9	(5)
2013–	China	139	(53)
Medal record
Women's football
Representing China
Asian Cup
Gold medal – first place	2022 India	Team
Asian Games
Silver medal – second place	2018 Palembang	Team
- * Club domestic league appearances and goals as of 24 May 2025 ‡ National team caps and goals as of 25 September 2026

Wang Shuang (Chinese: 王霜; pinyin: Wáng Shuāng; Mandarin pronunciation: [wǎŋ.ʂwáŋ]; born 23 January 1995) is a Chinese professional footballer who plays as a winger for Chinese Women's Super League club Wuhan Jiangda and the China national team. Being capped more than 100 times for her country, she is considered one of the most important players for the national team.

== Club career ==
Wang Shuang was spotted by scouts of WK-League side Daejeon Sportstoto while preparing for the 2013 National Games with provincial side Hubei. On 3 July 2013, it was announced that she had signed a contract with the club and would join after the 2013 EAFF Women's East Asian Cup. In her first season with the club, Wang helped Sportstoto reach the Korean Women's FA Cup final and was awarded the most valuable player award for scoring six goals in five appearances. The initial progress was halted due to her commitments with the 2013 National Games and the Chinese women's national team.

In December 2013, she signed a one-year contract with the club and was joined by Wu Haiyan. In 2015, she returned to Wuhan Jianghan University to prepare for the 2015 FIFA Women's World Cup. On 31 December 2015, Wang transferred to Chinese Women's Super League side Dalian Quanjian despite interest from several FA WSL clubs.

On 3 August 2018, Wang transferred to Division 1 Féminine club Paris Saint-Germain signing a two-year contract. On 5 July 2019, Wang left the club by mutual consent and returned to Wuhan Jianghan University once again.

On 10 August 2022, Wang signed with National Women's Soccer League club Racing Louisville FC through the 2023 season. She made her debut against Houston Dash on 12 August 2022 as a 60th-minute substitute.

On 8 December 2023, Wang signed for Women's Super League club Tottenham Hotspur.

== International career ==
Wang represented China PR U-17 at the age of 12. In 2012, she was included for the U-20 side at the FIFA U-20 Women's World Cup.

Wang was called up to the China women's national football team for the first time in 2013 making her debut on 12 January 2013 in a 1–0 loss against Canada. After the match, then-manager Hao Wei described the then 17-year-old as a player "of great potential". On 21 July 2013, she made her full international debut in a 2–0 loss against Japan in the 2013 EAFF Women's East Asian Cup.

Wang was the 2013 AFC U-19 Women's Championship's second top goalscorer. She was later nominated for the AFC Young Player of the Year award.

Wang was used largely as a substitute at the 2015 FIFA Women's World Cup, was selected for the 2015 EAFF Women's East Asian Cup and started 10 consecutive international matches to end the year 2015. She was the top goalscorer at the 2015 Yongchuan International Tournament.

She made her 100th appearance for China on 7 November 2019 in a 2–0 win against New Zealand during the 2019 Yongchuan International Tournament.

At the 2020 Olympics she scored four goals in China's group game against Zambia.

Wang Shuang scored five goals in the 2022 AFC Women's Asian Cup to help the team win the title.

== Personal life ==
Writing for The Players' Tribune in June 2019, Wang spoke about her disconnect with her parents, how she was raised by her uncle and aunt growing up and her struggles with impostor syndrome.

== Career statistics ==
=== Club ===
As of 24 May 2025

Appearances and goals by club, season and competition
Club	Season	League			National cup (Note: Includes Women's FA Cup)		League cup (Note: Includes NWSL Challenge Cup, FA Women's League Cup)		Continental (Note: Includes UEFA Women's Champions League, AFC Women's Champions League)		Total	
Club	Season	Division	Apps	Goals	Apps	Goals	Apps	Goals	Apps	Goals	Apps	Goals
Wuhan Jianghan University	2015	CWSL	5	3	?	?	—		—		5	3
Dalian Quanjian	2016	CWSL	13	8	?	?	—		—		13	8
Dalian Quanjian	2017	CWSL	6	1	?	?	—		—		6	1
Wuhan Jianghan University	2018	CWSL	8	7	?	?	—		—		8	7
Paris Saint-Germain	2018–19	D1 Féminine	18	7	0	0	—		5	1	23	8
Wuhan Jianghan University	2019	CWSL	12	3	?	?	—		—		12	3
Wuhan Jianghan University	2020	CWSL	13	4	?	?	—		—		13	4
Wuhan Jianghan University	2021	CWSL	12	6	?	?	—		—		12	6
Wuhan Jianghan University	2022	CWSL	?	?	?	?	—		—		?	?
Wuhan Jianghan University	Total		37	13	?	?	—		—		37	13
Racing Louisville	2022	NWSL	4	0	—		—		—		4	0
Racing Louisville	2023	NWSL	18	2	—		0	0	—		18	2
Racing Louisville	Total		22	2	—		0	0	—		22	2
Tottenham Hotspur	2023–24	Women's Super League	6	0	3	0	1	0	—		10	0
Tottenham Hotspur	2024–25	Women's Super League	0	0	0	0	1	0	—		1	0
Tottenham Hotspur	Total		6	0	3	0	2	0	—		11	0
Wuhan Jiangda	2025	CWSL	4	1	?	?	—		3	2	7	3
Career total			118	42	3	0	2	0	8	3	132	45

=== International ===
As of 25 September 2026

Appearances and goals by national team and year
National team	Year	Apps	Goals
China	2013	7	0
China	2014	4	1
China	2015	18	3
China	2016	21	4
China	2017	16	5
China	2018	19	12
China	2019	17	2
China	2020	0	0
China	2021	5	6
China	2022	6	5
China	2023	10	9
China	2024	3	0
China	2025	4	0
China	2026	9	6
Total		139	53

Scores and results list China's goal tally first, score column indicates score after each Wang goal.

List of international goals scored by Wang Shuang
No.	Date	Venue	Opponent	Score	Result	Competition
1	14 December 2014	Brasília, Brazil	Argentina	1–0	6–0	2014 International Women's Football Tournament of Brasília
2	23 October 2015	Chongqing, China	England	1–0	2–1	2015 Yongchuan International Tournament
3	23 October 2015	Chongqing, China	England	2–0	2–1	2015 Yongchuan International Tournament
4	15 December 2015	New Orleans, United States	United States	1–0	1–0	Friendly
5	2 March 2016	Osaka, Japan	North Korea	1–1	1–1	2016 AFC Women's Olympic Qualifying Tournament
6	11 April 2016	Qujing, China	Costa Rica	1–1	1–1	Friendly
7	20 October 2016	Chongqing, China	Iceland	1–1	2–2	2016 Yongchuan International Tournament
8	23 October 2016	Chongqing, China	Uzbekistan	4–1	4–1	2016 Yongchuan International Tournament
9	19 January 2017	Foshan, China	Thailand	1–0	2–0	2017 Four Nations Tournament
10	24 January 2017	Foshan, China	Ukraine	1–0	5–0	2017 Four Nations Tournament
11	24 January 2017	Foshan, China	Ukraine	4–0	5–0	2017 Four Nations Tournament
12	6 April 2017	Kunshan, China	Croatia	1–0	2–0	Friendly
13	21 October 2017	Chongqing, China	Mexico	3–2	3–2	2017 Yongchuan International Tournament
14	19 January 2018	Foshan, China	Vietnam	3–0	4–0	2018 Four Nations Tournament
15	23 January 2018	Foshan, China	Colombia	1–0	2–0	2018 Four Nations Tournament
16	6 April 2018	Amman, Jordan	Thailand	2–0	4–0	2018 AFC Women's Asian Cup
17	12 April 2018	Amman, Jordan	Jordan	1–0	8–1	2018 AFC Women's Asian Cup
18	12 April 2018	Amman, Jordan	Jordan	3–1	8–1	2018 AFC Women's Asian Cup
19	12 April 2018	Amman, Jordan	Jordan	7–1	8–1	2018 AFC Women's Asian Cup
20	17 August 2018	Palembang, Indonesia	Hong Kong	1–0	7–0	2018 Asian Games
21	20 August 2018	Palembang, Indonesia	Tajikistan	5–0	16–0	2018 Asian Games
22	22 August 2018	Palembang, Indonesia	North Korea	1–0	2–0	2018 Asian Games
23	25 August 2018	Palembang, Indonesia	Thailand	1–0	5–0	2018 Asian Games
24	25 August 2018	Palembang, Indonesia	Thailand	3–0	5–0	2018 Asian Games
25	25 August 2018	Palembang, Indonesia	Thailand	5–0	5–0	2018 Asian Games
26	7 November 2019	Chongqing, China	New Zealand	1–0	2–0	2019 Yongchuan International Tournament
27	7 November 2019	Chongqing, China	New Zealand	2–0	2–0	2019 Yongchuan International Tournament
28	8 April 2021	Goyang, South Korea	South Korea	2–1	2–1	2020 AFC Women's Olympic Qualifying Tournament
29	13 April 2021	Suzhou, China	South Korea	2–2	2–2	2020 AFC Women's Olympic Qualifying Tournament
30	24 July 2021	Rifu, Japan	Zambia	1–0	4–4	2020 Summer Olympics
31	24 July 2021	Rifu, Japan	Zambia	2–1	4–4	2020 Summer Olympics
32	24 July 2021	Rifu, Japan	Zambia	3–1	4–4	2020 Summer Olympics
33	24 July 2021	Rifu, Japan	Zambia	4–4	4–4	2020 Summer Olympics
34	20 January 2022	Mumbai, India	Chinese Taipei	1–0	4–0	2022 AFC Women's Asian Cup
35	20 January 2022	Mumbai, India	Chinese Taipei	4–0	4–0	2022 AFC Women's Asian Cup
36	23 January 2022	Mumbai, India	Iran	1–0	7–0	2022 AFC Women's Asian Cup
37	23 January 2022	Mumbai, India	Iran	3–0	7–0	2022 AFC Women's Asian Cup
38	30 January 2022	Navi Mumbai, India	Vietnam	1–1	3–1	2022 AFC Women's Asian Cup
39	28 July 2023	Adelaide, Australia	Haiti	1–0	1–0	2023 FIFA Women's World Cup
40	1 August 2023	Adelaide, Australia	England	1–3	1–6	2023 FIFA Women's World Cup
41	22 September 2023	Hangzhou, China	Mongolia	1–0	16–0	2022 Asian Games
42	22 September 2023	Hangzhou, China	Mongolia	3–0	16–0	2022 Asian Games
43	22 September 2023	Hangzhou, China	Mongolia	5–0	16–0	2022 Asian Games
44	22 September 2023	Hangzhou, China	Mongolia	7–0	16–0	2022 Asian Games
45	22 September 2023	Hangzhou, China	Mongolia	11–0	16–0	2022 Asian Games
46	30 September 2023	Hangzhou, China	Thailand	2–0	4–0	2022 Asian Games
47	30 September 2023	Hangzhou, China	Thailand	3–0	4–0	2022 Asian Games
48	3 March 2026	Sydney, Australia	Bangladesh	1–0	2–0	2026 AFC Women's Asian Cup
49	9 March 2026	Sydney, Australia	North Korea	2–1	2–1	2026 AFC Women's Asian Cup
50	3 June 2026	Wuhan, China	Russia	1–1	1–2	Friendly
51	14 September 2026	Gifu, Japan	Hong Kong	4–1	5–1	2026 Asian Games
52	14 September 2026	Gifu, Japan	Hong Kong	5–1	5–1	2026 Asian Games
53	25 September 2026	Osaka, Japan	Vietnam	1–0	1–0 (a.e.t.)	2026 Asian Games

== Honours ==
Dalian

- Chinese Women's Super League: 2016, 2017

Wuhan Jiangda

- Chinese Women's Super League: 2020, 2021
- AFC Women's Champions League: 2024–25

China

- AFC Women's Asian Cup: 2022
- Asian Games silver medalist: 2018, bronze medalist: 2022
- Four Nations Tournament: 2014, 2016, 2017, 2018, 2019
- Yongchuan International Tournament: 2015, 2016, 2017, 2018, 2019, 2025

Individual

- AFC Women's Footballer of the Year: 2018
- Chinese Women's Footballer of the Year: 2017, 2018, 2019, 2021
- Korean Women's FA Cup Most Valuable Player: 2013
- Yongchuan International Tournament Top Goalscorer: 2015, 2019

== See also ==
- List of women's footballers with 100 or more international caps
