= Chinese Footballer of the Year =

Chinese association football award

Chinese Footballer of the Year (Chinese: 中国金球奖) is an annual association football award organized and presented by Titan Sports Media Group. It includes two titles presented to the best Chinese male player and the best female player in the past calendar year respectively. The men and women winners are determined by a poll of journalists representing their media outlets from both China and overseas. Eligible for the award are Chinese players who hold the Chinese passport, whether they play in China or overseas. Wu Lei won the male prize for thrice while Wang Shuang won the female title for four times. They have the most Chinese Footballer of the Year titles in each category.

== Winners ==
=== Men's Prize ===
Year	Rank	Player	Club	Points
2017	1st	Feng Xiaoting	(China) Guangzhou Evergrande	441
2017	2nd	Wu Lei	(China) Shanghai SIPG	393
2017	3rd	Zheng Zhi	(China) Guangzhou Evergrande	281
2018	1st	Wu Lei	(China) Shanghai SIPG	639
2018	2nd	Yan Junling	(China) Shanghai SIPG	201
2018	3rd	Jin Jingdao	(China) Shandong Luneng	181
2019	1st	Wu Lei	(Spain) Espanyol	466
2019	2nd	Hao Junmin	(China) Shandong Luneng	279
2019	3rd	Elkeson	(China) Guangzhou Evergrande	262
2020	1st	Wu Xi	(China) Jiangsu Suning	555
2020	2nd	Wei Shihao	(China) Guangzhou Evergrande	297
2020	3rd	Wu Lei	(Spain) Espanyol	266
2021	1st	Wu Lei	(Spain) Espanyol	405
2021	2nd	Guo Tianyu	(China) Shandong Taishan	257
2021	3rd	Zhang Yuning	(China) Beijing Guoan	240
2022	1st	Zhang Yuning	(China) Beijing Guoan	516
2022	2nd	Xie Pengfei	(China) Wuhan Three Towns	285
2022	3rd	Wu Lei	(China) Shanghai Port	282

=== Women's Prize ===
Year	Rank	Player	Club
2017	1st	Wang Shuang	(China) Wuhan Jianghan University
2017	2nd	Wang Shanshan	(China) Tianjin Huisen
2017	3rd	Pang Fengyue	(China) Dalian Quanjian
2018	1st	Wang Shuang	(France) Paris Saint-Germain
2018	2nd	Wang Shanshan	(China) Dalian Quanjian
2018	3rd	Li Ying	(China) Shandong Ladies
2019	1st	Wang Shuang	(China) Wuhan Jianghan University
2019	2nd	Li Ying	(China) Shandong Ladies
2019	3rd	Wu Haiyan	(China) Wuhan Jianghan University
2020	1st	Tang Jiali	(China) Shanghai Shengli
2020	2nd	Ma Xiaoxu	(China) Beijing BG Phoenix
2020	3rd	Wu Haiyan	(China) Wuhan Jianghan University
2021	1st	Wang Shuang	(China) Wuhan Jianghan University
2021	2nd	Tang Jiali	(England) Tottenham Hotspur F.C. Women
2021	3rd	Shen Mengyu	(Scotland) Celtic F.C. Women
2022	1st	Wang Shanshan	(China) Wuhan Jianghan University
2022	2nd	Zhang Linyan	(Switzerland) Grasshopper Club Zürich
2022	3rd	Tang Jiali	(Spain) Madrid CFF
