= Kanjana Sungngoen =

Thai footballer (born 1986)

Kanjana Sung-ngoen
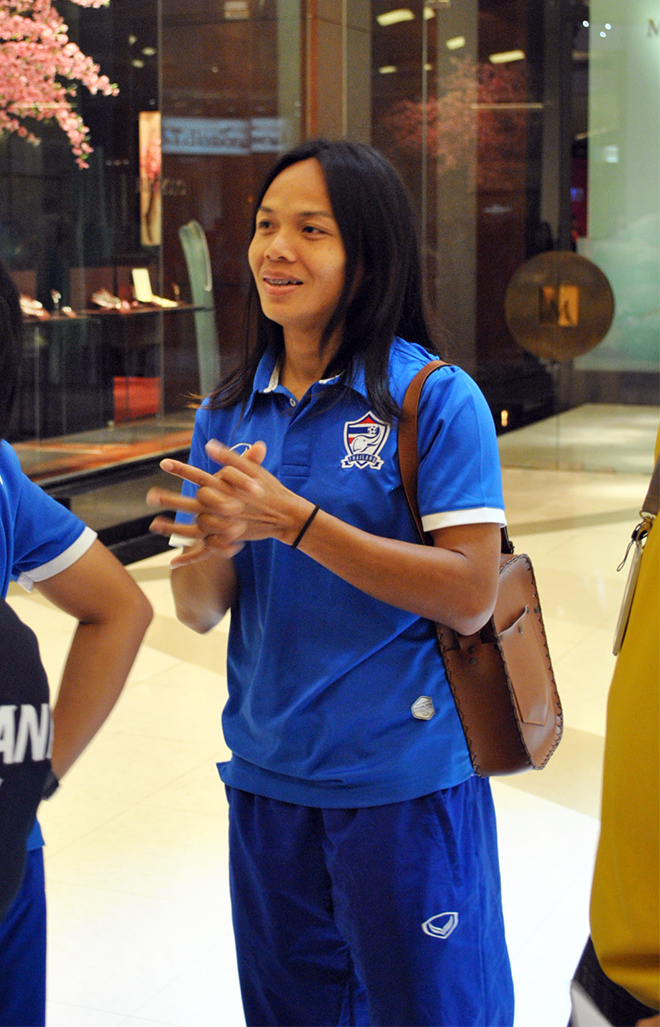

Personal information
- Full name: Kanjana Sung-ngoen
- Date of birth: 21 September 1986 (age 40)
- Place of birth: Surin, Thailand
- Height: 1.64 m (5 ft 4 1/2 in)
- Positions: Forward; winger

Team information
- Current team: Bangkok
- Number: 99

Youth career
- 2002–2004: Satriwitthaya Phutthamonthon School

Senior career*
Years	Team	Apps	(Gls)
2013	Speranza F.C. Osaka-Takatsuki	2	(0)
2013	Bangkok		
–2025	Chonburi		
2026–	Bangkok		

International career^{‡}
2004–2006	Thailand U19		
2009–	Thailand	58	(17)
- * Club domestic league appearances and goals ‡ National team caps and goals as of 22:54, 16 June 2019 (UTC)

Kanjana Sungngoen (Thai: กาญจนา สังข์เงิน; RTGS: Kanchana Sang-ngoen; born 21 September 1986) is a Thai international footballer currently playing as a forward for Bangkok.

== Career ==
Sungngoen scored Thailand's only goal at the 2019 Women's World Cup, in a 5–1 loss to Sweden.

== Clubs ==
#	Year	Club
1.	2013	Speranza F.C. Osaka-Takatsuki
2.	2013–present	Bangkok

== International goals ==
No.	Date	Venue	Opponent	Score	Result	Competition
1.	4 December 2009	National University of Laos Stadium, Vientiane, Laos	Malaysia	7–0	14–0	2009 Southeast Asian Games
2.	19 October 2011	New Laos National Stadium, Vientiane, Laos	Philippines	2–0	5–1	2011 AFF Women's Championship
3.	21 October 2011	Laos National Stadium, Vientiane, Laos	Myanmar	1–1	3–1	2011 AFF Women's Championship
4.	25 October 2011	New Laos National Stadium, Vientiane, Laos	Myanmar	2–0	2–1	2011 AFF Women's Championship
5.	22 September 2012	Thống Nhất Stadium, Hồ Chí Minh City, Vietnam	Laos	6–1	14–1	2012 AFF Women's Championship
6.	22 September 2012	Thống Nhất Stadium, Hồ Chí Minh City, Vietnam	Laos	7–1	14–1	2012 AFF Women's Championship
7.	22 September 2012	Thống Nhất Stadium, Hồ Chí Minh City, Vietnam	Laos	14–1	14–1	2012 AFF Women's Championship
8.	18 December 2013	Mandalarthiri Stadium, Mandalay, Myanmar	Myanmar	1–0	2–2 (a.e.t.) (9–8 p)	2013 Southeast Asian Games
9.	19 May 2014	Gò Đậu Stadium, Thủ Dầu Một, Vietnam	Myanmar	1–0	2–1	2014 AFC Women's Asian Cup
10.	21 May 2014	Thống Nhất Stadium, Hồ Chí Minh City, Vietnam	Vietnam	1–0	2–1	2014 AFC Women's Asian Cup
11.	21 May 2014	Thống Nhất Stadium, Hồ Chí Minh City, Vietnam	Vietnam	2–0	2–1	2014 AFC Women's Asian Cup
12.	21 September 2014	Incheon Namdong Asiad Rugby Field, Incheon, South Korea	India	4–0	10–0	2014 Asian Games
13.	21 September 2014	Incheon Namdong Asiad Rugby Field, Incheon, South Korea	India	5–0	10–0	2014 Asian Games
14.	21 September 2014	Incheon Namdong Asiad Rugby Field, Incheon, South Korea	India	6–0	10–0	2014 Asian Games
15.	21 September 2014	Incheon Namdong Asiad Rugby Field, Incheon, South Korea	India	7–0	10–0	2014 Asian Games
16.	10 May 2015	Thống Nhất Stadium, Hồ Chí Minh City, Vietnam	Myanmar	1–0	3–2	2015 AFF Women's Championship
17.	26 July 2016	Mandalarthiri Stadium, Mandalay, Myanmar	Philippines	3–0	4–0	2016 AFF Women's Championship
18.	24 January 2017	Century Lotus Stadium, Foshan, China	Myanmar	1–0	3–0	2017 Four Nations Tournament
19.	24 January 2017	Century Lotus Stadium, Foshan, China	Myanmar	2–0	3–0	2017 Four Nations Tournament
20.	3 April 2017	Faisal Al-Husseini International Stadium, Al-Ram, Palestine	Palestine	1–0	6–0	2018 AFC Women's Asian Cup qualification
21.	10 June 2017	PAT Stadium, Bangkok, Thailand	Chinese Taipei	2–1	4–1	Friendly
22.	10 June 2017	PAT Stadium, Bangkok, Thailand	Chinese Taipei	3–1	4–1	Friendly
23.	19 January 2018	Century Lotus Stadium, Foshan, China	Colombia	1–0	1–1	2018 Four Nations Tournament
24.	21 January 2018	Century Lotus Stadium, Foshan, China	China	1–0	1–2	2018 Four Nations Tournament
25.	23 January 2018	Century Lotus Stadium, Foshan, China	Vietnam	1–0	2–0	2018 Four Nations Tournament
26.	9 April 2018	King Abdullah II Stadium, Amman, Jordan	Jordan	4–0	6–1	2018 AFC Women's Asian Cup
27.	12 April 2018	King Abdullah II Stadium, Amman, Jordan	Philippines	1–0	3–1	2018 AFC Women's Asian Cup
28.	12 April 2018	King Abdullah II Stadium, Amman, Jordan	Philippines	2–0	3–1	2018 AFC Women's Asian Cup
29.	17 April 2018	King Abdullah II Stadium, Amman, Jordan	Australia	1–1	2–2 (a.e.t.) (1–3 p)	2018 AFC Women's Asian Cup
30.	2 July 2018	Bumi Sriwijaya Stadium, Palembang, Indonesia	Timor-Leste	2–0	8–0	2018 AFF Women's Championship
31.	6 July 2018	Bumi Sriwijaya Stadium, Palembang, Indonesia	Malaysia	2–0	8–0	2018 AFF Women's Championship
32.	11 July 2018	Bumi Sriwijaya Stadium, Palembang, Indonesia	Myanmar	1–1	3–1	2018 AFF Women's Championship
33.	1 June 2019	Den Dreef, Leuven, Belgium	Belgium	1–6	1–6	Friendly
34.	16 June 2019	Allianz Riviera, Nice, France	Sweden	1–4	1–5	2019 FIFA Women's World Cup
35.	19 August 2019	IPE Chonburi Stadium, Chonburi, Thailand	Timor-Leste	4–0	9–0	2019 AFF Women's Championship
36.	19 August 2019	IPE Chonburi Stadium, Chonburi, Thailand	Timor-Leste	5–0	9–0	2019 AFF Women's Championship

== Honours ==
=== International ===
Thailand

- AFC Women's Championship
  - Fourth Place: 2018
  - Fifth Place: 2014
- AFF Women's Championship: Champions: 2011, 2015, 2016, 2018
  - Runner-up: 2019
- Southeast Asian Games: Gold Medal: 2013
  - Silver Medal: 2009, 2017, 2019
