= 2015 Yongchuan International Tournament =

Dewellbon Cup

Tournament details
- Host country: China
- City: Chongqing
- Dates: 23–27 October 2015
- Teams: 3 (from 2 confederations)
- Venue(s): 1 (in 1 host city)

Final positions
- Champions: China (1st title)
- Runners-up: England
- Third place: Australia

Tournament statistics
- Matches played: 3
- Goals scored: 6 (2 per match)
- Top scorer(s): (China) Wang Shuang
- Best player(s): (China) Li Dongna
- Best goalkeeper: (England) Karen Bardsley

The Dewellbon Cup 2015 Yongchuan International Tournament (Chinese: 2015年德威堡杯永川国际女子足球邀请赛) was the inaugural edition of the Yongchuan International Tournament, an invitational women's football tournament held in Yongchuan District, Chongqing, China.

== Participants ==
In September 2015, the participants were announced. New Zealand withdrew from the tournament in October 2015.

| Team | FIFA Rankings (September 2015) |
|---|---|
| England | 5 |
| Australia | 9 |
| China (host) | 15 |

== Venues ==
| Chongqing | Yongchuan Sports Center is located in China |
| Yongchuan Sports Center | Yongchuan Sports Center is located in China |
| 29.345833°N 105.933611°E | Yongchuan Sports Center is located in China |
| Capacity: 25,017 | Yongchuan Sports Center is located in China |

== Standings ==
| Team | Pld | W | D | L | GF | GA | GD | Pts |
|---|---|---|---|---|---|---|---|---|
| China | 2 | 1 | 1 | 0 | 3 | 2 | +1 | 4 |
| England | 2 | 1 | 0 | 1 | 2 | 2 | 0 | 3 |
| Australia | 2 | 0 | 1 | 1 | 1 | 2 | –1 | 1 |

== Match results ==
All times are local, CST (UTC+8).

23 October
16:00

| China | 2–1 | England |
|---|---|---|
| Wang Shuang 5', 45' | | Aluko 45+3' |

Yongchuan Sports Center, Chongqing
Referee: Qin Liang (China)
25 October
16:00

| China | 1–1 | Australia |
|---|---|---|
| Li Dongna 41' (pen.) | | Butt 12' |

Yongchuan Sports Center, Chongqing
Referee: Li Juan (China)
27 October
16:00

| Australia | 0–1 | England |
|---|---|---|
| | | Christiansen 51' |

Yongchuan Sports Center, Chongqing
Referee: Qin Liang (China)

== Statistics ==
There were 6 goals scored in 3 matches, for an average of 2 goals per match.

2 goals

- (China) Wang Shuang

1 goal

- (Australia) Tameka Yallop
- (China) Li Dongna
- (England) Eniola Aluko
- (England) Izzy Christiansen
