= Li Dongna =

Chinese footballer

Li Dongna 李冬娜
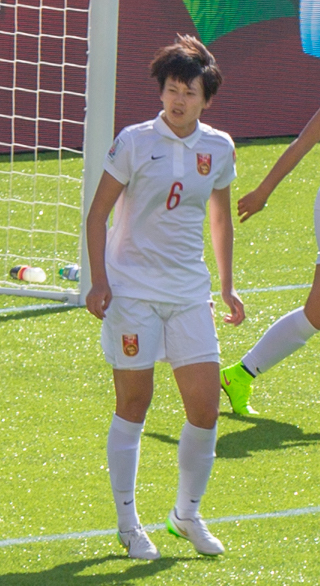

Personal information
- Full name: Li Dongna
- Date of birth: 6 December 1988 (age 37)
- Place of birth: Dalian, Liaoning, China
- Height: 1.75 m (5 ft 9 in)
- Position: Defender

Senior career*
Years	Team	Apps	(Gls)
2006–2014	Tianjin Huisen		
2015	Suwon FMC		
2016–2019	Dalian	1	(0)
2022	Tianjin Shengde		

International career^{‡}
2007–2016	China	91	(6)
- * Club domestic league appearances and goals as of 24 October 2016 ‡ National team caps and goals as of 24 October 2016

Li Dongna (Chinese: 李冬娜; pinyin: Lǐ Dōngnà, born 6 December 1988) is a Chinese former footballer who played as a Defender.

== Honours ==
=== Club ===
Tianjin Huisen

- Chinese Women's Super League: 2007

=== International ===
China PR national football team

- Four Nations Tournament: 2009, 2014, 2016

== International goals ==
No.	Date	Venue	Opponent	Score	Result	Competition
1.	22 September 2014	Incheon Namdong Asiad Rugby Field, Incheon, South Korea	Jordan	4–0	5–0	2014 Asian Games
2.	25 October 2015	Yongchuan Sports Center, Chongqing, China	Australia	1–1	1–1	2015 Yongchuan International Tournament
