= 2019 Yongchuan International Tournament =

Tournament details
- Host country: China
- City: Chongqing
- Dates: 7–10 November 2019
- Teams: 4 (from 4 confederations)
- Venue: 1 (in 1 host city)

Final positions
- Champions: China (4th title)
- Runners-up: Brazil
- Third place: Canada
- Fourth place: New Zealand

Tournament statistics
- Matches played: 4
- Goals scored: 9 (2.25 per match)
- Top scorer(s): (Brazil) Bia Zaneratto (Canada) Janine Beckie (China) Wang Shuang
- Best player: (China) Wang Shuang

The 2019 Yongchuan International Tournament (Chinese: 2019年茶山竹海杯永川国际女子足球邀请赛) was the 5th edition of the Yongchuan International Tournament, an invitational women's football tournament held in Yongchuan District, Chongqing, China. Unlike the previous editions of the tournament where each team played all the other teams, 2019 tournament was played in bracket format where the winners of the first round played each other and the losers of the first round played each other to determine the standings.

== Participants ==
In September 2019, the participants were announced.

Team	FIFA Rankings (September 2018)
China (host)	16
Canada	7
Brazil	11
New Zealand	23

== Venues ==
Chongqing	Yongchuan Sports Center is located in China
Yongchuan Sports Center	Yongchuan Sports Center is located in China
29.345833°N 105.933611°E	Yongchuan Sports Center is located in China
Capacity: 25,017	Yongchuan Sports Center is located in China

== Match results ==
All times are local, CST (UTC+8).

=== Bracket ===
Semi-final
7 November 2019 16:00 – Yongchuan Sports Center
Brazil	4
Canada	0
7 November 2024 19:35 - Yongchuan Sports Center
New Zealand	0
China	2

Final
10 November 19:35 – Yongchuan Sports Center
Brazil	0(2)
China (p)	0(4)
Third place play-off
10 November 16:00 – Yongchuan Sports Center
Canada	3
New Zealand	0

=== Semi-finals ===
7 November 2019
16:00

Brazil	4–0	Canada
Chú 12'; Formiga 23'; Bia Zaneratto 41', 57'	Report

Yongchuan Sports Center, Chongqing
Referee: Cha Min-ji (South Korea)

7 November 2019
19:35

New Zealand	0–2	China
	Report	Wang Shuang 61', 90+3'

Yongchuan Sports Center, Chongqing
Referee: Law Bik Chi (Hong Kong)

=== Third place playoff ===
10 November 2019
16:00

Canada	3–0	New Zealand
Sinclair 35'; Beckie 64', 67'	Report

Yongchuan Sports Center, Chongqing

=== Final ===
10 November 2019
19:35

Brazil	0–0	China
	Report
Penalties
Tamires (penalty missed); Aline Milene (penalty scored); Raquel (penalty scored); Andressinha (penalty missed)	2–4	(penalty scored) Wang Shuang; (penalty scored) Tang Jiali; (penalty scored) Liu Shanshan; (penalty scored) Wu Haiyan

Yongchuan Sports Center, Chongqing

== Statistics ==
There were 9 goals scored in 4 matches, for an average of 2.25 goals per match.

2 goals

- (Brazil) Bia Zaneratto
- (Canada) Janine Beckie
- (China) Wang Shuang

1 goal

- (Brazil) Chú Santos
- (Brazil) Formiga
- (Canada) Christine Sinclair
