= 2017 Four Nations Tournament (women's football) =

Foshan International Tournament

Tournament details
- Host country: China
- City: Foshan
- Dates: 19–24 January 2017
- Teams: 4 (from 2 confederations)
- Venue(s): Century Lotus Stadium (in Foshan host cities)

Final positions
- Champions: China (5th title)
- Runners-up: Thailand
- Third place: Ukraine
- Fourth place: Myanmar

Tournament statistics
- Matches played: 6
- Goals scored: 17 (2.83 per match)

The 2017 Four Nations Tournament was the 16th edition of the Four Nations Tournament, an invitational women's football tournament held in China.

== Participants ==
Team	FIFA Rankings (December 2016)
China (host)	13
Ukraine	26
Thailand	30
Myanmar	43

== Venues ==
Foshan	Century Lotus Stadium is located in China
Century Lotus Stadium	Century Lotus Stadium is located in China
22.969828°N 113.114296°E	Century Lotus Stadium is located in China
Capacity: 36,686	Century Lotus Stadium is located in China

== Match officials ==
The following referees were chosen for the 2017 Four Nations Tournament.

Referees

- (China) Guan Xing
- (China) Li Minglu
- (China) Mi Siyu
- (China) Yu Hong

Assistant referees

- (China) Bao Mengxiao
- (China) Cui Yongmei
- (China) Fang Yan
- (China) Song Xiangyun

== Standings ==
Team	Pld	W	D	L	GF	GA	GD	Pts
China	3	3	0	0	9	0	+9	9
Thailand	3	2	0	1	4	2	+2	6
Ukraine	3	1	0	2	4	6	−2	3
Myanmar	3	0	0	3	0	9	−9	0

== Match results ==
19 January 2017
16:00 (local time) UTC+08:00

Myanmar	0–4	Ukraine
	Report	Kozyrenko 28', 45+2'; Boychenko 37'; Khimich 90+4'

Century Lotus Stadium, Foshan
19 January 2017
19:35 (local time) UTC+08:00

China	2–0	Thailand
Wang Shuang 21'; Lou Jiahui 90+3'	Report

Century Lotus Stadium, Foshan
Referee: Yu Hong (China)

21 January 2017
16:00 (local time) UTC+08:00

China	2–0	Myanmar
Zhang Rui 48', 60'	Report

Century Lotus Stadium, Foshan
Referee: Mi Siyu (China)
21 January 2017
19:35 (local time) UTC+08:00

Ukraine	0–1	Thailand
	Report	Orathai 39'

Century Lotus Stadium, Foshan

24 January 2017
16:00 (local time) UTC+08:00

Thailand	3–0	Myanmar
Kanjana 21', 45+2'; Taneekarn 58'

Century Lotus Stadium, Foshan
24 January 2017
19:35 (local time) UTC+08:00

Ukraine	0–5	China
		Wang Shuang 22', 43' (pen.); Ren Guixin 25'; Tang Jiali 29'; Yan Jinjin 83'

Century Lotus Stadium, Foshan
Referee: Guan Xing (China)
