= Ren Guixin =

Chinese footballer

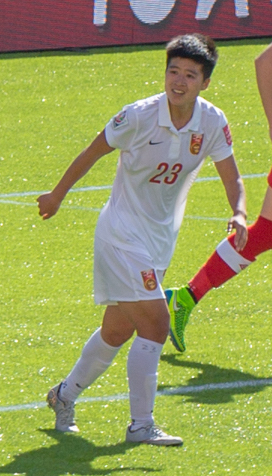

Personal information
- Full name: Ren Guixin
- Date of birth: December 19, 1988 (age 37)
- Place of birth: Baotou, Inner Mongolia, China
- Height: 1.62 m (5 ft 4 in)
- Position: Midfielder

Senior career*
Years	Team	Apps	(Gls)
2004–2020	Changchun Jiuyin Loans	0	(4)

International career^{‡}
2012–2018	China	85	(9)
Medal record
Women's football
Representing China
Asian Games
Silver medal – second place	2018 Palembang	Team
- * Club domestic league appearances and goals ‡ National team caps and goals as of 5 June 2016

Ren Guixin (Chinese: 任桂辛; pinyin: Rén Guìxīn) is a female Chinese former footballer who played as a midfielder. She spent her entire career with Chinese Women's Super League Club Changchun Jiuyin Loans. China Central Television reported that a thigh injury ruled Ren out of the 2016 Olympics.

== International goals ==
No.	Date	Venue	Opponent	Score	Result	Competition
1.	17 May 2014	Thống Nhất Stadium, Ho Chi Minh City, Vietnam	Myanmar	1–0	3–0	2014 AFC Women's Asian Cup
2.	2 June 2016	Kunshan Stadium, Kunshan, China	Thailand	4–0	6–0	Friendly
3.	5 June 2016	Changzhou Olympic Sports Centre, Changzhou, China	Thailand	2–0	3–0	Friendly
4.	24 October 2016	Yongchuan Sports Center, Chongqing, China	Denmark	1–0	1–0	2016 Yongchuan International Tournament
5.	24 January 2017	Century Lotus Stadium, Foshan, China	Ukraine	2–0	5–0	2017 Four Nations Tournament
6.	15 December 2017	Fukuda Denshi Arena, Chiba, Japan	South Korea	3–1	3–1	2017 EAFF E-1 Football Championship
7.	21 January 2018	Century Lotus Stadium, Foshan, China	Thailand	2–1	2–1	2018 Four Nations Tournament
8.	23 January 2018	Century Lotus Stadium, Foshan, China	Colombia	2–0	2–0	2018 Four Nations Tournament
9.	8 October 2018	Yongchuan Sports Center, Chongqing, China	Thailand	2–0	2–0	2018 Yongchuan International Tournament

== Honours ==
China

- Asian Games silver medalist: 2018
- AFC Women's Asian Cup third place: 2014, 2018

== See also ==
- List of women's footballers with 100 or more international caps
