= 2018 Four Nations Tournament (women's football) =

Foshan International Tournament

Tournament details
- Host country: China
- City: Foshan
- Dates: 19–23 January 2018
- Teams: 4 (from 2 confederations)
- Venue(s): 1 (in Foshan host cities)

Final positions
- Champions: China (6th title)
- Runners-up: Thailand
- Third place: Colombia
- Fourth place: Vietnam

Tournament statistics
- Matches played: 6
- Goals scored: 15 (2.5 per match)
- Best player(s): (China) Wang Shuang

The 2018 Four Nations Tournament was the 17th edition of the Four Nations Tournament, an invitational women's football tournament held annually in China.

== Teams ==
Team	FIFA Rankings (15 December 2017)
China (host)	16
Colombia	24
Thailand	30
Vietnam	32

== Venues ==
Foshan	Century Lotus Stadium is located in China
Century Lotus Stadium	Century Lotus Stadium is located in China
22.969828°N 113.114296°E	Century Lotus Stadium is located in China
Capacity: 36,686	Century Lotus Stadium is located in China

== Standings ==
Team	Pld	W	D	L	GF	GA	GD	Pts
China	3	3	0	0	8	1	+7	9
Thailand	3	1	1	1	4	3	+1	4
Colombia	3	1	1	1	3	3	0	4
Vietnam	3	0	0	3	0	8	−8	0

== Matches ==
All times are local (UTC+08:00).

19 January 2018
16:00

Colombia	1–1	Thailand
Caro 57'	Report (in Thai); Report	Kanjana 51'

Century Lotus Stadium, Foshan
19 January 2018
19:35

China	4–0	Vietnam
Jin Kun 26'; Wang Shanshan 47'; Wang Shuang 60'; Song Duan 84'	Report (in Chinese)

Century Lotus Stadium, Foshan
Referee: Qin Liang (China)
21 January 2018
16:00

China	2–1	Thailand
Wang Shanshan 30'; Ren Guixin 49' (pen.)	Report (in Chinese)	Kanjana 21'

Century Lotus Stadium, Foshan
Referee: Yu Hong (China)
21 January 2018
19:35

Vietnam	0–2	Colombia
		González 18'; Usme 36'

Century Lotus Stadium, Foshan
23 January 2018
16:00

Thailand	2–0	Vietnam
Taneekarn 83'; Kanjana 90' (pen.)	Report (in Thai)

Century Lotus Stadium, Foshan
23 January 2018
19:35

Colombia	0–2	China
	Report (in Chinese)	Wang Shuang 39'; Ren Guixin 64'

Century Lotus Stadium, Foshan
Referee: Qin Liang (China)
