= 2017 Yongchuan International Tournament =

Marvel Track Cup

Tournament details
- Host country: China
- City: Chongqing
- Dates: 19–24 October 2017
- Teams: 4 (from 3 confederations)
- Venue(s): 1 (in 1 host city)

Final positions
- Champions: Brazil (1st title)
- Runners-up: North Korea
- Third place: China
- Fourth place: Mexico

Tournament statistics
- Matches played: 6
- Goals scored: 18 (3 per match)
- Top scorer(s): (Brazil) Marta
- Best player(s): (China) Wang Shanshan

The Marvel Track Cup 2017 Yongchuan International Tournament (Chinese: 2017年元臻杯永川国际女子足球邀请赛) was the third edition of the Yongchuan International Tournament, an invitational women's football tournament held in Yongchuan District, Chongqing, China.

== Participants ==
In September 2017, the participants were announced.

Team	FIFA Rankings (September 2017)
Brazil	9
North Korea	10
China (host)	13
Mexico	26

== Venues ==
Chongqing	Yongchuan Sports Center is located in China
Yongchuan Sports Center	Yongchuan Sports Center is located in China
29.345833°N 105.933611°E	Yongchuan Sports Center is located in China
Capacity: 25,017	Yongchuan Sports Center is located in China

== Standings ==
Team	Pld	W	D	L	GF	GA	GD	Pts
Brazil	3	2	1	0	7	2	+5	7
North Korea	3	2	0	1	3	3	0	6
China	3	1	1	1	6	6	0	4
Mexico	3	0	0	3	2	7	-5	0

== Match results ==
All times are local, CST (UTC+8).

19 October
16:00

Brazil	3–0	Mexico
Marta 54'; Bruna Benites 58'; Bia Zaneratto 76'

Yongchuan Sports Center, Chongqing
Referee: Gu Chunhan (China)
19 October
19:35

China	1–2	North Korea
Wang Shanshan 73'		Kim Phyong-hwa 4'; Kim Yun-mi 67'

Yongchuan Sports Center, Chongqing
Referee: Law Bik Chi (Hong Kong)
21 October
16:00

Brazil	2–0	North Korea
Marta 16', 30'

Yongchuan Sports Center, Chongqing
Referee: Law Bik Chi (Hong Kong)
21 October
19:35

China	3–2	Mexico
Xiao Yuyi 30'; Zhang Rui 69'; Wang Shuang 75'		Calderón 1'; Ferral 54'

Yongchuan Sports Center, Chongqing
Referee: Gu Chunhan (China)
24 October
16:00

Mexico	0–1	North Korea
		Campos 20' (o.g.)

Yongchuan Sports Center, Chongqing
Referee: Gu Chunhan (China)
24 October
19:35

China	2–2	Brazil
Wang Shanshan 54', 60'		Marta 32' (pen.); Adriana Leal 34'

Yongchuan Sports Center, Chongqing
Referee: Law Bik Chi (Hong Kong)

== Statistic ==
There were 18 goals scored in 6 matches, for an average of 3 goals per match.

4 goals

- (Brazil) Marta

3 goals

- (China) Wang Shanshan

1 goal

- (Brazil) Bruna Benites
- (Brazil) Bia Zaneratto
- (China) Xiao Yuyi
- (China) Zhang Rui
- (China) Wang Shuang
- (Mexico) Ariana Calderón
- (Mexico) Cristina Ferral
- (North Korea) Kim Phyong-hwa
- (North Korea) Kim Yun-mi

1 own goal

- (Mexico) Bri Campos (against North Korea)
