= 2012 Four Nations Tournament (women's football) =

Yongchuan Cup

Tournament details
- Host country: China
- City: Yongchuan
- Dates: 15–19 February 2012
- Teams: 4 (from 2 confederations)
- Venue(s): Yongchuan Sports Center

The 2012 Four Nations Tournament was the eleventh edition of the Four Nations Tournament, an invitational women's football tournament held in China.

== Participants ==
Team	FIFA Rankings (December 2011)
North Korea	9
South Korea	16
China (host)	18
Mexico	21

== Venues ==
Chongqing	Yongchuan Sports Center is located in China
Yongchuan Sports Center	Yongchuan Sports Center is located in China
29.345833°N 105.933611°E	Yongchuan Sports Center is located in China
Capacity: 25,017	Yongchuan Sports Center is located in China

== Final standings ==
Team	Pld	W	D	L	GF	GA	GD	Pts
North Korea	3	2	1	0	2	0	+2	7
China	3	1	2	0	1	0	+1	5
South Korea	3	1	1	1	3	3	0	4
Mexico	3	0	0	3	2	5	−3	0

== Match results ==
15 February 2012
15:00

China	1–0	Mexico
Li Wen 48'

Yongchuan Sports Center, Chongqing
15 February 2012
18:00

South Korea	0–1	North Korea
		Yun Hyon-hi 73'

Yongchuan Sports Center, Chongqing

17 February 2012
15:00

China	0–0	South Korea

Yongchuan Sports Center, Chongqing
17 February 2012
18:00

Mexico	0–1	North Korea
		64'

Yongchuan Sports Center, Chongqing

19 February 2012
14:00

China	0–0	North Korea

Yongchuan Sports Center, Chongqing
19 February 2012
17:00

Mexico	2–3	South Korea
23'; 80'		9'; 21'; 58'

Yongchuan Sports Center, Chongqing
