= 2018 Yongchuan International Tournament =

Tea Mountain Bamboo Forest Cup

Tournament details
- Host country: China
- City: Chongqing
- Dates: 4–8 October 2018
- Teams: 4 (from 2 confederations)
- Venue(s): 1 (in 1 host city)

Final positions
- Champions: China (3rd title)
- Runners-up: Portugal
- Third place: Finland
- Fourth place: Thailand

Tournament statistics
- Matches played: 6
- Goals scored: 14 (2.33 per match)
- Top scorer(s): (Portugal) Carolina Mendes
- Best player(s): (China) Gu Yasha
- Best goalkeeper: (Portugal) Patrícia Morais

The Tea Mountain Bamboo Forest Cup 2018 Yongchuan International Tournament (Chinese: 2018年茶山竹海杯永川国际女子足球邀请赛) was the 4th edition of the Yongchuan International Tournament, an invitational women's football tournament held in Yongchuan District, Chongqing, China.

== Participants ==
In September 2018, the participants were announced.

Team	FIFA Rankings (September 2018)
China (host)	15
Thailand	28
Finland	31
Portugal	33

== Venues ==
Chongqing	Yongchuan Sports Center is located in China
Yongchuan Sports Center	Yongchuan Sports Center is located in China
29.345833°N 105.933611°E	Yongchuan Sports Center is located in China
Capacity: 25,017	Yongchuan Sports Center is located in China

== Standings ==
Team	Pld	W	D	L	GF	GA	GD	Pts
China	3	2	1	0	4	1	+3	7
Portugal	3	1	2	0	4	1	+3	5
Finland	3	1	1	1	4	3	+1	4
Thailand	3	0	0	3	2	9	-7	0

=== Match results ===
All times are local, CST (UTC+8).

4 October
16:00

Thailand	1–3	Finland
Rattikan 15'		Summanen 2'; Öling 6', 64'

Yongchuan Sports Center, Chongqing
Referee: Yu Hong (China)
4 October
19:35

China	0–0	Portugal

Yongchuan Sports Center, Chongqing
Referee: Qin Liang (China)

6 October
16:00

Thailand	1–4	Portugal
Kanyanat 45+1'		Leite 42'; C. Mendes 67', 86', 90+3'

Yongchuan Sports Center, Chongqing
Referee: Chang Xinxin (China)
6 October
19:35

Finland	1–2	China
Ahtinen 12'		Yang Lina 24'; Zhang Rui 87' (pen.)

Yongchuan Sports Center, Chongqing
Referee: Qin Liang (China)

8 October
16:00

Portugal	0–0	Finland

Yongchuan Sports Center, Chongqing
Referee: Chang Xinxin (China)
8 October
19:35

China	2–0	Thailand
Li Ying 4'; Ren Guixin 15'

Yongchuan Sports Center, Chongqing
Referee: Yu Hong (China)

== Statistics ==
There were 14 goals scored in 6 matches, for an average of 2.33 goals per match.

3 goals

- (Portugal) Carolina Mendes

2 goals

- (Finland) Ria Öling

1 goal

- (China) Yang Lina
- (China) Zhang Rui
- (China) Li Ying
- (China) Ren Guixin
- (Finland) Eveliina Summanen
- (Finland) Olga Ahtinen
- (Portugal) Ana Leite
- (Thailand) Rattikan Thongsombut
- (Thailand) Kanyanat Chetthabutr
