= 2011 Four Nations Tournament (women's football) =

Yongchuan Cup

Tournament details
- Host country: China
- City: Yongchuan
- Dates: 21–25 January 2011
- Teams: 4 (from 3 confederations)
- Venue: Yongchuan Sports Center

The 2011 Four Nations Tournament was the tenth edition of the Four Nations Tournament, an invitational women's football tournament held in China. The venue for this edition of the tournament was Yongchuan Olympic Sports Centre, in the city of Yongchuan.

== Participants ==
Team	FIFA Rankings (November 2010)
United States	1
Sweden	4
Canada	9
China (host)	13

== Venues ==
Chongqing	Yongchuan Sports Center is located in China
Yongchuan Sports Center	Yongchuan Sports Center is located in China
29.345833°N 105.933611°E	Yongchuan Sports Center is located in China
Capacity: 25,017	Yongchuan Sports Center is located in China

== Final standings ==
Team	Pld	W	D	L	GF	GA	GD	Pts
United States	3	2	0	1	5	3	+2	6
Canada	3	2	0	1	5	4	+1	6
Sweden	3	1	0	2	3	4	−1	3
China	3	1	0	2	4	6	−2	3

== Match results ==
21 January 2011

Sweden	2–1	United States
Segerström 16'; Asllani 61'		Lloyd 11'

Yongchuan Sports Center, Chongqing
Attendance: 16,000
Referee: Qin Liang (China)
21 January 2011

China	2–3	Canada
You Jia 19', 36'		Tancredi 56'; Sinclair 80', 90+4'

Yongchuan Sports Center, Chongqing
Attendance: 10,000

23 January 2011

China	2–1	Sweden
Nilsson 32' (o.g.); You Jia 61'		Almgren 15'

Yongchuan Sports Center, Chongqing
23 January 2011

United States	2–1	Canada
Cheney 54'; Tarpley 70'		Tancredi 56'

Yongchuan Sports Center, Chongqing
Attendance: 7,000
Referee: He Jin (China)

25 January 2011

Canada	1–0	Sweden
Sinclair 32'

Yongchuan Sports Center, Chongqing
Attendance: 12,000
25 January 2011

China	0–2	United States
		Lloyd 31'; Rodriguez 67'

Yongchuan Sports Center, Chongqing
Attendance: 12,000
Referee: Wang Jia (China)
