= 2014 Four Nations Tournament (women's football) =

Yongchuan Cup

Tournament details
- Host country: China
- City: Yongchuan
- Dates: 11–15 February 2014
- Teams: 4 (from 3 confederations)
- Venue: Yongchuan Sports Center

Final positions
- Champions: China
- Runners-up: North Korea
- Third place: Mexico
- Fourth place: New Zealand

Tournament statistics
- Matches played: 6
- Goals scored: 12 (2 per match)

The 2014 Four Nations Tournament was the thirteenth edition of the Four Nations Tournament, an invitational women's football tournament held in China. The tournament was won by China.

== Participants ==
Team	FIFA Rankings (December 2013)
North Korea	10
New Zealand	16
China (host)	18
Mexico	25

== Venues ==
Chongqing	Yongchuan Sports Center is located in China
Yongchuan Sports Center	Yongchuan Sports Center is located in China
29.345833°N 105.933611°E	Yongchuan Sports Center is located in China
Capacity: 25,017	Yongchuan Sports Center is located in China

== Final standings ==
Team	Pld	W	D	L	GF	GA	GD	Pts
China	3	3	0	0	5	1	+4	9
North Korea	3	2	0	1	3	1	+2	6
Mexico	3	1	0	2	3	6	−3	3
New Zealand	3	0	0	3	1	4	−3	0

== Match results ==
11 February 2014
14:00

China	1–0	New Zealand
Wang Chen 71'

Yongchuan Sports Center, Chongqing
11 February 2014
17:00

North Korea	2–0	Mexico
Kim Yun-mi 48'; Ra Un-sim 53'	Report

Yongchuan Sports Center, Chongqing

13 February 2014
14:00

China	3–1	Mexico
Yang Li 4', 15'; Ren Guixin 22'	Report	Rangel 2'

Yongchuan Sports Center, Chongqing
13 February 2014
17:00

North Korea	1–0	New Zealand
42'

Yongchuan Sports Center, Chongqing

15 February 2014
14:00

China	1–0	North Korea
Kim Un-ha 57' (o.g.)

Yongchuan Sports Center, Chongqing
15 February 2014
17:00

New Zealand	1–2	Mexico
Hearn 37'	Report	Cuellar 4'; Noyola 74'

Yongchuan Sports Center, Chongqing
