= 2013 Four Nations Tournament (women's football) =

Yongchuan Cup

Tournament details
- Host country: China
- City: Yongchuan
- Dates: 12–16 January 2013
- Teams: 4 (from 3 confederations)
- Venue: Yongchuan Sports Center

The 2013 Four Nations Tournament was the twelfth edition of the Four Nations Tournament, an invitational women's football tournament held in China.

== Participants ==
Team	FIFA Rankings (December 2012)
Canada	7
Norway	12
South Korea	16
China (host)	17

== Venues ==
Chongqing	Yongchuan Sports Center is located in China
Yongchuan Sports Center	Yongchuan Sports Center is located in China
29.345833°N 105.933611°E	Yongchuan Sports Center is located in China
Capacity: 25,017	Yongchuan Sports Center is located in China

== Final standings ==
Team	Pld	W	D	L	GF	GA	GD	Pts
Norway	3	2	1	0	3	0	+3	7
Canada	3	1	1	1	2	3	−1	4
China	3	1	0	2	2	2	0	3
Korea Republic	3	1	0	2	3	5	−2	3

== Match results ==
12 January 2013
14:00

Norway	2–0	Korea Republic
Thorsnes 28'; Kaurin 75'

Yongchuan Sports Center, Chongqing
12 January 2013
17:00

Canada	1–0	China
Leon 75'

Yongchuan Sports Center, Chongqing
Attendance: 16,802

14 January 2013
16:00

China	0–1	Norway
		Bjånesøy 88'

Yongchuan Sports Center, Chongqing
14 January 2013
19:00

Canada	1–3	Korea Republic
Prince 79'		Jeon Ga-eul 18'; Ji So-yun 29'; Jung Seol-bin 56'

Yongchuan Sports Center, Chongqing
Attendance: 1,000

16 January 2013
14:00

China	2–0	Korea Republic
Zhang Rui 63'; Lee Eun-mi 64' (o.g.)

Yongchuan Sports Center, Chongqing
16 January 2013
17:00

Canada	0–0	Norway

Yongchuan Sports Center, Chongqing
