= Xu Yanlu =

Chinese footballer

Personal information
- Full name: Xu Yanlu
- Date of birth: 16 September 1991 (age 35)
- Place of birth: Nantong, Jiangsu, China
- Height: 1.58 m (5 ft 2 in)
- Position: Midfielder

Senior career*
Years	Team	Apps	(Gls)
2019–2023	Jiangsu Huatai	27	(3)

International career^{‡}
2012–2018	China	27	(3)
- * Club domestic league appearances and goals ‡ National team caps and goals as of 12:11, 6 June 2015 (UTC)

Xu Yanlu
- Simplified Chinese: 许燕露
- Traditional Chinese: 許燕露
Transcriptions
Standard Mandarin
- Hanyu Pinyin: Xǔ Yànlù
- IPA: [ɕỳ jɛ̂n lû]

Xu Yanlu (Chinese: 许燕露; pinyin: Xǔ Yànlù; Mandarin pronunciation: [ɕỳ jɛ̂n lû]; born 16 September 1991) is a female Chinese former football player who plays as a midfielder.

== International goals ==
No.	Date	Venue	Opponent	Score	Result	Competition
1.	15 May 2014	Thống Nhất Stadium, Hồ Chí Minh City, Vietnam	Thailand	6–0	7–0	2014 AFC Women's Asian Cup
2.	18 September 2015	Chenzhou Olympic Sports Centre, Chenzhou, China	Spain	1–0	1–2	Friendly
