= Wu Haiyan =

Chinese footballer (born 1993)

Wu Haiyan 吴海燕
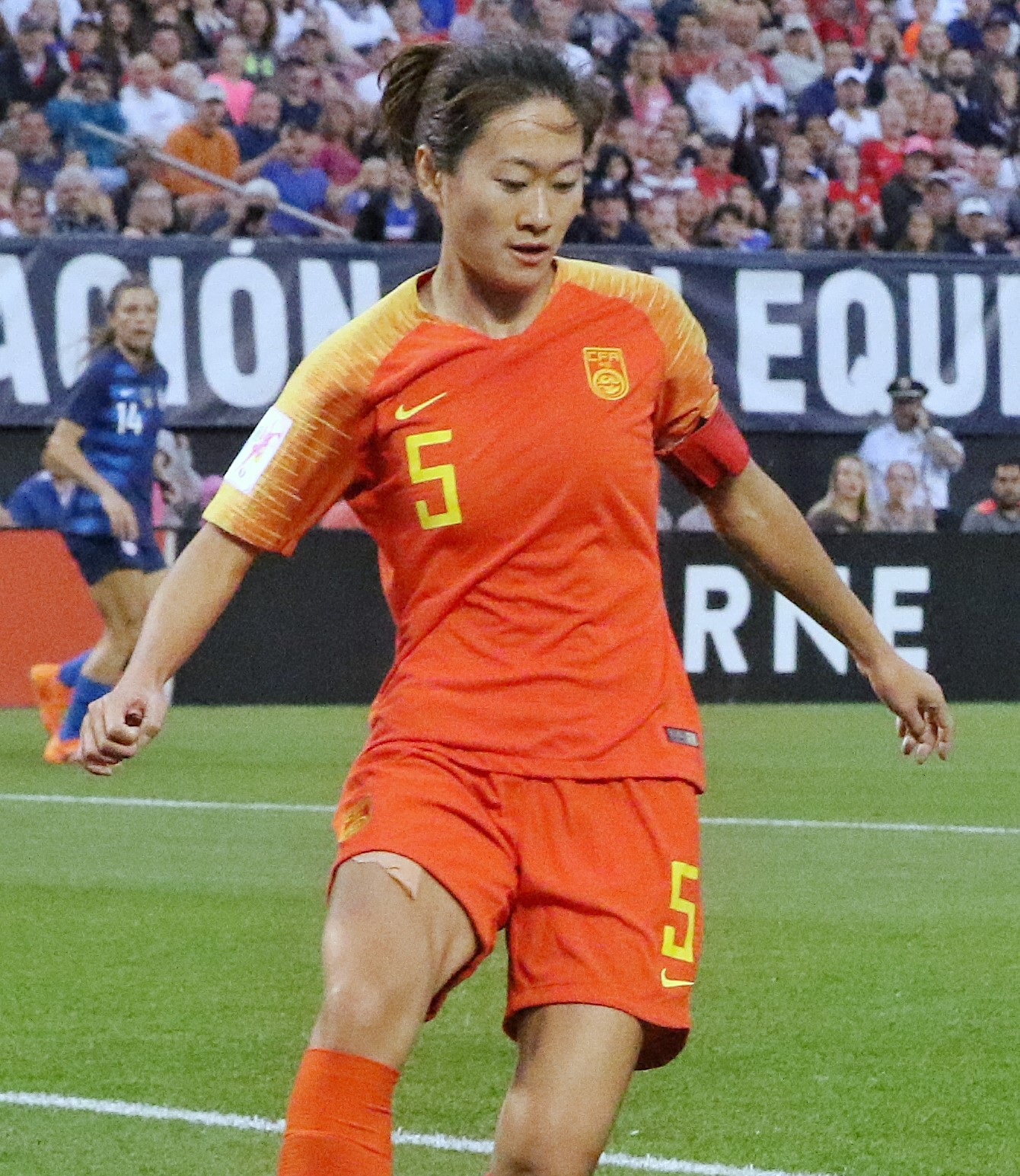

Personal information
- Full name: Wu Haiyan
- Date of birth: 26 February 1993 (age 33)
- Place of birth: Jiande, Zhejiang, China
- Height: 1.66 m (5 ft 5 in)
- Position: Defender

Team information
- Current team: Wuhan Jianghan University
- Number: 5

Senior career*
Years	Team	Apps	(Gls)
2012–2013	Hangzhou Xizi		
2014	Daejeon Sportstoto		
2015–2017	Shandong Xiangshang		
2018–	Wuhan Jianghan University	0	(0)

International career^{‡}
2012–2013	China U-20	7	(0)
2012–	China	124	(2)
Medal record
Women's football
Representing China
Asian Games
Silver medal – second place	2018 Palembang	Team
- * Club domestic league appearances and goals as of 12 March 2020 ‡ National team caps and goals as of 8 April 2021

Wu Haiyan (simplified Chinese: 吴海燕; traditional Chinese: 吳海燕; pinyin: Wú Hǎiyàn; born 26 February 1993) is a Chinese footballer who plays for Wuhan Jianghan University in the Chinese Women's Super League.

== Career ==
On 24 May 2025, Wu won the inaugural 2024–25 AFC Women's Champions League with Wuhan Jianghan University.

== International career ==
In May 2014, Wu was called up to the China squad for the 2014 AFC Women's Asian Cup.

On 28 May 2015, Wu was called up to the China squad for the 2015 FIFA Women's World Cup.

On 7 July 2016, Wu was called up to the China squad for the 2016 Summer Olympics.

On 29 March 2018, Wu was called up to the China squad for the 2018 AFC Women's Asian Cup.

On 27 May 2019, Wu was called up to the China squad for the 2019 FIFA Women's World Cup.

On 10 February 2020, Wu Haiyan scored a goal in a match with Chinese Taipei.

On 7 July 2021, Wu Haiyan was called up to the China squad for the 2020 Summer Olympics.

On 5 July 2023, Wu was called up to the China squad for the 2023 FIFA Women's World Cup.

On 19 February 2026, Wu was called up to the China squad for the 2026 AFC Women's Asian Cup.

In March 2026, Wu spoke about how missing out on the China squad for the 2022 AFC Women's Asian Cup, which China won, motivated her to be successful at the 2026 AFC Women's Asian Cup.

=== International goals ===
No.	Date	Venue	Opponent	Score	Result	Competition
1.	17 December 2019	Busan Gudeok Stadium, Busan, South Korea	Chinese Taipei	1–0	1–0	2019 EAFF E-1 Football Championship
2.	10 February 2020	Campbelltown Stadium, Sydney, Australia	Chinese Taipei	2–0	5–0	2020 AFC Women's Olympic Qualifying Tournament

== See also ==
- List of women's footballers with 100 or more caps

== Honours ==
China

- Asian Games silver medalist: 2018
- AFC Women's Asian Cup third place: 2014, 2018

Wuhan Jiangda

- AFC Women's Champions League: 2024–25
