= Wang Shanshan =

Chinese footballer (born 1990)

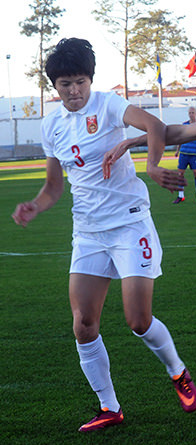
- Wang with China at the 2015 Algarve Cup

Personal information
- Full name: Wang Shanshan
- Date of birth: 27 January 1990 (age 36)
- Place of birth: Luoyang, Henan, China
- Height: 1.68 m (5 ft 6 in)
- Positions: Forward; defender

Team information
- Current team: Beijing Jingtan
- Number: 11

Senior career*
Years	Team	Apps	(Gls)
2015–2017	Tianjin Huisen		
2018–2019	Dalian Quanjian		(1)
2019–2021	Wuhan Jianghan	20	(4)
2021	Tianjin Shengde	5	(5)
2022	Beijing Jingtan	10	(5)
2023	Wuhan Jianghan University	3	(1)
2024-	Beijing Jingtan		

International career^{‡}
2012–2023	China	154	(58)
Medal record
Women's football
Representing China
Asian Games
Silver medal – second place	2018 Palembang	Team
- * Club domestic league appearances and goals as of 25 June 2019 ‡ National team caps and goals as of 30 July 2023

Wang Shanshan (Chinese: 王珊珊; pinyin: Wáng Shānshān; born 27 January 1990) is a Chinese association football player who plays for Chinese Women's Super League club Beijing Jingtan.

== Career ==
Wang has previously been named Chinese Women's Footballer of the Year in 2023.

== International career ==
Wang played at the 2011 Summer Universiade. She made her debut for the senior team in March 2012 against Germany. In April 2015, she scored in China's 2–1 friendly defeat to England.

In May 2014, Wang was called up to the China squad for the 2014 AFC Women's Asian Cup.

On 28 May 2015, Wang was called up to the China squad for the 2015 FIFA Women's World Cup.

On 7 July 2016, Wang was called up to the China squad for the 2016 Summer Olympics.

On 29 March 2018, Wang was called up to the China squad for the 2018 AFC Women's Asian Cup.

At the 2018 Asian Games in Indonesia, she scored 9 goals against Tajikistan after coming off the bench in the 56th minute.

On 27 May 2019, Wang was called up to the China squad for the 2019 FIFA Women's World Cup.

On 7 July 2021, Wang was called up to the China squad for the 2020 Summer Olympics.

On 5 July 2023, Wang was called up to the China squad for the 2023 FIFA Women's World Cup.

== Style of play ==
Wang is adept at both defence and attack, thus becoming a prime example of a utility player in football. Chinese press likens her to legendary Dutchman Ruud Gullit.

Her all-roundedness is most prominently demonstrated on international duty at the 2015 FIFA Women's World Cup.

== International goals ==
No.	Date	Venue	Opponent	Score	Result	Competition
1.	20 November 2012	Shenzhen, China	Hong Kong	5–0	6–0	2013 EAFF Women's East Asian Cup
2.	22 November 2012	Shenzhen, China	Chinese Taipei	2–0	2–0	2013 EAFF Women's East Asian Cup
3.	11 March 2015	Parchal, Portugal	Portugal	2–0	3–3 (7–8 p)	2015 Algarve Cup
4.	9 April 2015	Manchester, England	England	1–1	1–2	Friendly
5.	15 June 2015	Winnipeg, Canada	New Zealand	2–1	2–2	2015 FIFA Women's World Cup
6.	20 June 2015	Edmonton, Canada	Cameroon	1–0	1–0	2015 FIFA Women's World Cup
7.	4 August 2015	Wuhan, China	North Korea	2–2	2–3	2015 EAFF Women's East Asian Cup
8.	23 January 2016	Foshan, China	Vietnam	5–0	8–0	2016 Four Nations Tournament
9.	23 January 2016	Foshan, China	Vietnam	7–0	8–0	2016 Four Nations Tournament
10.	26 January 2016	Foshan, China	South Korea	2–0	2–0	2016 Four Nations Tournament
11.	7 March 2016	Osaka, Japan	South Korea	1–0	1–0	2016 AFC Women's Olympic Qualifying Tournament
12.	29 July 2016	São Paulo, Brazil	Zimbabwe	1–0	3–0	Friendly
13.	6 March 2017	Albufeira, Portugal	Australia	1–0	1–2	2017 Algarve Cup
14.	8 March 2017	Parchal, Portugal	Iceland	1–1	1–2	2017 Algarve Cup
15.	6 April 2017	Kunshan, China	Croatia	2–0	2–0	Friendly
16.	19 October 2017	Chongqing, China	North Korea	1–2	1–2	2017 Yongchuan International Tournament
17.	24 October 2017	Chongqing, China	Brazil	1–2	2–2	2017 Yongchuan International Tournament
18.	24 October 2017	Chongqing, China	Brazil	2–2	2–2	2017 Yongchuan International Tournament
19.	15 December 2017	Chiba, Japan	South Korea	1–0	3–1	2017 EAFF E-1 Football Championship
20.	19 January 2018	Foshan, China	Vietnam	2–0	4–0	2018 Four Nations Tournament
21.	21 January 2018	Foshan, China	Thailand	1–1	2–1	2018 Four Nations Tournament
22.	23 January 2018	Foshan, China	Colombia	1–0	2–0	2018 Four Nations Tournament
23.	20 April 2018	Amman, Jordan	Thailand	2–0	3–1	2018 AFC Women's Asian Cup
24.	17 August 2018	Palembang, Indonesia	Hong Kong	2–0	7–0	2018 Asian Games
25.	20 August 2018	Palembang, Indonesia	Tajikistan	7–0	16–0	2018 Asian Games
26.	20 August 2018	Palembang, Indonesia	Tajikistan	8–0	16–0	2018 Asian Games
27.	20 August 2018	Palembang, Indonesia	Tajikistan	9–0	16–0	2018 Asian Games
28.	20 August 2018	Palembang, Indonesia	Tajikistan	10–0	16–0	2018 Asian Games
29.	20 August 2018	Palembang, Indonesia	Tajikistan	11–0	16–0	2018 Asian Games
30.	20 August 2018	Palembang, Indonesia	Tajikistan	12–0	16–0	2018 Asian Games
31.	20 August 2018	Palembang, Indonesia	Tajikistan	14–0	16–0	2018 Asian Games
32.	20 August 2018	Palembang, Indonesia	Tajikistan	15–0	16–0	2018 Asian Games
33.	20 August 2018	Palembang, Indonesia	Tajikistan	16–0	16–0	2018 Asian Games
34.	22 August 2018	Palembang, Indonesia	North Korea	2–0	2–0	2018 Asian Games
35.	28 August 2018	Palembang, Indonesia	Chinese Taipei	1–0	1–0	2018 Asian Games
36.	1 December 2018	Dededo, Guam	Mongolia	1–0	10–0	2019 EAFF E-1 Football Championship
37.	1 December 2018	Dededo, Guam	Mongolia	3–0	10–0	2019 EAFF E-1 Football Championship
38.	1 December 2018	Dededo, Guam	Mongolia	5–0	10–0	2019 EAFF E-1 Football Championship
39.	1 December 2018	Dededo, Guam	Mongolia	9–0	10–0	2019 EAFF E-1 Football Championship
40.	3 December 2018	Dededo, Guam	Hong Kong	2–0	6–0	2019 EAFF E-1 Football Championship
41.	5 December 2018	Dededo, Guam	Chinese Taipei	1–0	2–0	2019 EAFF E-1 Football Championship
42.	1 March 2019	Albufeira, Portugal	Norway	1–3	1–3	2019 Algarve Cup
43.	4 April 2019	Wuhan, China	Russia	2–1	4–1	2019 Wuhan International Tournament
44.	4 April 2019	Wuhan, China	Russia	4–1	4–1	2019 Wuhan International Tournament
45.	7 April 2019	Wuhan, China	Cameroon	1–0	1–0	2019 Wuhan International Tournament
46.	31 May 2019	Créteil, France	France	1–1	1–2	Friendly
47.	7 February 2020	Sydney, Australia	Thailand	3–0	6–1	2020 AFC Women's Olympic Qualifying Tournament
48.	10 February 2020	Sydney, Australia	Chinese Taipei	3–0	5–0	2020 AFC Women's Olympic Qualifying Tournament
49.	10 February 2020	Sydney, Australia	Chinese Taipei	4–0	5–0	2020 AFC Women's Olympic Qualifying Tournament
50.	27 July 2021	Yokohama, Japan	Netherlands	1–1	2–8	2020 Summer Olympics
51.	20 January 2022	Mumbai, India	Chinese Taipei	2–0	4–0	2022 AFC Women's Asian Cup
52.	23 January 2022	Mumbai, India	Iran	4–0	7–0	2022 AFC Women's Asian Cup
53.	23 January 2022	Mumbai, India	Iran	5–0	7–0	2022 AFC Women's Asian Cup
54.	30 January 2022	Navi Mumbai, India	Vietnam	2–1	3–1	2022 AFC Women's Asian Cup
55.	3 February 2022	Pune, India	Japan	2–2	2–2 (a.e.t.) (5–4 p)	2022 AFC Women's Asian Cup
56.	22 September 2023	Hangzhou, China	Mongolia	2–0	16–0	2022 Asian Games
57.	22 September 2023	Hangzhou, China	Mongolia	6–0	16–0	2022 Asian Games
58.	28 September 2023	Hangzhou, China	Uzbekistan	1–0	6–0	2022 Asian Games
59.	28 September 2023	Hangzhou, China	Uzbekistan	2–0	6–0	2022 Asian Games
60.	30 September 2023	Hangzhou, China	Thailand	1–0	4–0	2022 Asian Games
61.	6 October 2023	Hangzhou, China	Uzbekistan	3–0	7–0	2022 Asian Games
62.	1 November 2023	Xiamen, China	South Korea	1–1	1–1	2024 AFC Women's Olympic Qualifying Tournament

== Honours ==
China

- Asian Games silver medalist: 2018; bronze medalist: 2022
- AFC Women's Asian Cup: 2022

Individual

- AFC Women's Asian Cup MVP: 2022

== See also ==
- List of women's footballers with 100 or more caps
