= 2014 AFC Women's Asian Cup =

Tournament details
- Host country: Vietnam
- Dates: 14–25 May
- Teams: 8 (from 1 confederation)
- Venues: 2 (in 2 host cities)

Final positions
- Champions: Japan (1st title)
- Runners-up: Australia
- Third place: China
- Fourth place: South Korea

Tournament statistics
- Matches played: 17
- Goals scored: 67 (3.94 per match)
- Attendance: 45,250 (2,662 per match)
- Top scorer(s): (China) Yang Li (South Korea) Park Eun-sun (6 goals)
- Best player: (Japan) Aya Miyama
- Fair play award: Japan

The 2014 AFC Women's Asian Cup, the 18th edition of the competition, was a women's association football tournament competed by national teams in Asian Football Confederation (AFC). It served as the qualification for the 2015 FIFA Women's World Cup. It was played from 14 to 25 May 2014 in Vietnam. See the logo at this link. Even the host needed to qualify, despite the semifinalists of the previous edition qualified automatically.

Reigning world champions Japan defeated the reigning Asian champions Australia 1–0 in the final to secure their first continental title.

The worst team (8/8) was Myanmar, with 0 points and a -16 goal diference (1:17).

== The tournament qualifies for... ==
- 2015 FIFA Women's World Cup and 2018 AFC Women's Asian Cup:

- Champions (Japan)

- Runners-up (Australia)

- Third place (China)

- 2015 FIFA Women's World Cup:

- Fourth place (South Korea)

- Winner of the fifth place match (Thailand)

== Qualification ==
The final tournament was competed by eight teams, four of which were automatically qualified though their 2010 placement, while the others were determined via a qualification tournament.

North Korea was banned from the tournament due to the sanction on their doping cases in 2011 FIFA Women's World Cup. Hosts Vietnam had to play the qualifying round; in case of a non-qualification, another host would have been chosen.

=== Qualified teams ===
Country	Qualified as	Qualified on	Previous appearances in tournament (Note: Bold: winner, Italics: host.)
Australia	2010 AFC Women's Asian Cup top four	21 May 2010	4 (1975, 2006, 2008, **2010**)
Japan	2010 AFC Women's Asian Cup top four	22 May 2010	14 (1977, 1981, 1986, 1989, 1991, 1993, 1995, 1997, 1999, 2001, 2003, 2006, 2008, 2010)
China	2010 AFC Women's Asian Cup top four	23 May 2010	12 (**1986**, **1989**, **1991**, **1993**, **1995**, **1997**, **1999**, 2001, 2003, **2006**, 2008, 2010)
South Korea	2010 AFC Women's Asian Cup top four	26 September 2012	10 (1991, 1993, 1995, 1997, 1999, 2001, 2003, 2006, 2008, 2010)
Myanmar	Group D winner	25 May 2013	3 (2003, 2006, 2010)
Thailand	Group B winner	25 May 2013	14 (1975, 1977, 1981, **1983**, 1986, 1989, 1991, 1995, 1999, 2001, 2003, 2006, 2008, 2010)
Vietnam	Group C winner	26 May 2013	6 (1999, 2001, 2003, 2006, 2008, 2010)
Jordan	Group A winner	9 June 2013	0 (debut)

== Venues ==
The competition was played in two venues in Thủ Dầu Một and Ho Chi Minh City.

2014 AFC Women's Asian Cup is located in Vietnam	Thủ Dầu Một	Ho Chi Minh City
2014 AFC Women's Asian Cup is located in Vietnam	Gò Đậu Stadium	Thống Nhất Stadium
2014 AFC Women's Asian Cup is located in Vietnam	Capacity: 18,250	Capacity: 15,000

== Draw ==
The draw was held on 29 November 2013. The eight teams were drawn into two groups of four teams. The teams were seeded according to their performance in the previous final tournament and qualification, with the hosts Vietnam automatically seeded and assigned to Position A1 in the draw. So here is the pots information. (Uncoherent)

Pot 1	Pot 2	Pot 3	Pot 4
1. Vietnam (host)	2. Australia; 3. China; 4. Japan; 5. South Korea	6. Thailand	7. Myanmar; 8. Jordan

== Group stage ==
The top two teams advanced to the semifinals, and the two third-placed teams played a play-off match for fifth place and the final World Cup qualifying spot. In the group stage, teams tied in the points were ranked by the following criteria:

1. Greater number of points between the teams concerned,
2. Goal differences between the teams concerned,
3. Number of goals between the teams concerned,
4. Goal differences between in all round-robin matches,
5. Number of goals between in all round-robin matches,
6. Penalty shoot-out (in case just two teams playing the final match tied in the all conditions above),
7. Fewer yellow and red card points in all group matches (1 point for each yellow card, 3 points for each red card as a consequence of two yellow cards, 3 points for each direct red card, 4 points for each yellow card followed by a direct red card), and
8. Drawing of lots.

All times are local (UTC+7).

=== Group A ===
Pos	Team	Pld	W	D	L	GF	GA	GD	Pts	Qualification
1	Japan	3	2	1	0	13	2	+11	7	Knockout stage and Women's World Cup
2	Australia	3	2	1	0	7	3	+4	7	Knockout stage and Women's World Cup
3	Vietnam (H)	3	1	0	2	3	7	−4	3	Repechage play-off
4	Jordan	3	0	0	3	2	13	−11	0	

Source: AFC Schedule & Results
(H) Hosts
14 May 2014
17:15

Vietnam	3–1	Jordan
Nguyễn Thị Muôn 18'; Lê Thu Thanh Hương 36', 84'	Report (AFC); Report	Jbarah 34'

Thống Nhất Stadium, Ho Chi Minh City
Attendance: 5,000
Referee: Pannipar Kamnueng (Thailand)
14 May 2014
20:15

Australia	2–2	Japan
Foord 21'; De Vanna 64'	Report (AFC); Report	Polkinghorne 71' (o.g.); Ōgimi 84'

Thống Nhất Stadium, Ho Chi Minh City
Attendance: 2,000
Referee: Qin Liang (China)

16 May 2014
17:15

Jordan	1–3	Australia
Al-Naber 70'	Report (AFC); Report	Gill 35', 50'; Gorry 66'

Thống Nhất Stadium, Ho Chi Minh City
Attendance: 1,200
Referee: Ri Hyang-ok (North Korea)
16 May 2014
20:15

Japan	4–0	Vietnam
Kawasumi 44', 87'; Kiryu 65'; Ōgimi 69'	Report (AFC); Report

Thống Nhất Stadium, Ho Chi Minh City
Attendance: 1,200
Referee: Abirami Apbai Naidu (Singapore)

18 May 2014
19:15

Vietnam	0–2	Australia
	Report (AFC); Report	Lê Thị Thương 42' (o.g.); Gorry 90'

Thống Nhất Stadium, Ho Chi Minh City
Attendance: 3,000
Referee: Pannipar Kamnueng (Thailand)
18 May 2014
19:15

Japan	7–0	Jordan
Kira 25', 90+3'; Nakajima 45+1', 75'; Sakaguchi 49', 81'; Alhyasat 69' (o.g.)	Report (AFC); Report

Gò Đậu Stadium, Thủ Dầu Một
Attendance: 800
Referee: Abirami Apbai Naidu (Singapore)

=== Group B ===
Pos	Team	Pld	W	D	L	GF	GA	GD	Pts	Qualification
1	South Korea	3	2	1	0	16	0	+16	7	Knockout stage and Women's World Cup
2	China	3	2	1	0	10	0	+10	7	Knockout stage and Women's World Cup
3	Thailand	3	1	0	2	2	12	−10	3	Repechage play-off
4	Myanmar	3	0	0	3	1	17	−16	0	

Source: AFC Schedule & Results
15 May 2014
17:15

South Korea	12–0	Myanmar
Ji So-yun 4'; Park Eun-sun 17' (pen.), 43'; Park Hee-young 33'; Jeon Ga-eul 36', 40' (pen.), 63'; Cho So-hyun 45+3', 61', 82'; Kwon Hah-nul 58'; Yeo Min-ji 76'	Report (AFC); Report

Thống Nhất Stadium, Ho Chi Minh City
Attendance: 300
Referee: Casey Reibelt (Australia)
15 May 2014
20:15

China	7–0	Thailand
Li Dongna 6'; Li Ying 8'; Yang Li 16', 45+1', 64', 90+1'; Xu Yanlu 75'	Report (AFC); Report

Thống Nhất Stadium, Ho Chi Minh City
Attendance: 300
Referee: Rita Gani (Malaysia)

17 May 2014
17:15

Myanmar	0–3	China
	Report (AFC); Report	Ren Guixin 10'; Ma Xiaoxu 60'; Yang Li 87'

Thống Nhất Stadium, Ho Chi Minh City
Attendance: 200
Referee: Sachiko Yamagishi (Japan)
17 May 2014
20:15

Thailand	0–4	South Korea
	Report (AFC); Report	Ji So-yun 11'; Park Eun-sun 12', 47', 84'

Thống Nhất Stadium, Ho Chi Minh City
Attendance: 200
Referee: Công Thị Dung (Vietnam)

19 May 2014
19:15

South Korea	0–0	China
	Report (AFC); Report

Thống Nhất Stadium, Ho Chi Minh City
Attendance: 350
Referee: Casey Reibelt (Australia)
19 May 2014
19:15

Thailand	2–1	Myanmar
Kanjana 27' (pen.); Duangnapa 59'	Report (AFC); Report	Yee Yee Oo 45+1'

Gò Đậu Stadium, Thủ Dầu Một
Attendance: 800
Referee: Rita Gani (Malaysia)

== Fifth place play-off ==
Thailand won the play-off and thus qualified for the 2015 FIFA Women's World Cup.

21 May 2014
17:15

Vietnam	1–2	Thailand
Nguyễn Thị Tuyết Dung 86'	Report (AFC); Report	Kanjana 48', 65'

Thống Nhất Stadium, Ho Chi Minh City
Attendance: 18,000
Referee: Sachiko Yamagishi (Japan)

== Knockout stage ==
In the knockout stage (including the fifth place match), extra time and penalty shoot-out are used to decide the winner if necessary.

Semifinals
22 May
Japan (a.e.t.)	2
China	1
22 May
South Korea	1
Australia	2

Final
25 May
Japan	1
Australia	0
Third place
25 May
China	2
South Korea	1

All times are local (UTC+7).

=== Semi-finals ===
22 May 2014
17:15

Japan	2–1 (a.e.t.)	China
Sawa 51'; Iwashimizu 120+2'	Report (AFC); Report	Li Dongna 80' (pen.)

Thống Nhất Stadium, Ho Chi Minh City
Attendance: 700
Referee: Pannipar Kamnueng (Thailand)
22 May 2014
20:45

South Korea	1–2	Australia
Park Eun-sun 53' (pen.)	Report (AFC); Report	Gorry 47'; Kellond-Knight 77'

Thống Nhất Stadium, Ho Chi Minh City
Attendance: 700
Referee: Rita Gani (Malaysia)

=== Third place match ===
25 May 2014
16:45

China	2–1	South Korea
Park Eun-sun 3' (o.g.); Yang Li 90+3'	Report (AFC); Report	Yoo Young-a 80'

Thống Nhất Stadium, Ho Chi Minh City
Attendance: 500
Referee: Sachiko Yamagishi (Japan)

=== Final ===
25 May 2014
20:15

Japan	1–0	Australia
Iwashimizu 28'	Report (AFC); Report

Thống Nhất Stadium, Ho Chi Minh City
Attendance: 10,000
Referee: Qin Liang (China)

== Awards ==
AFC Women's Asian Cup
2014 champions

Japan
First title

== Goalscorers ==
There were 67 goals scored in 17 matches, for an average of 3.94 goals per match.

6 goals

- (China) Yang Li
- (South Korea) Park Eun-sun

3 goals

- (Australia) Katrina Gorry
- (South Korea) Cho So-hyun
- (South Korea) Jeon Ga-eul
- (Thailand) Kanjana Sungngoen

2 goals

- (Australia) Kate Gill
- (China) Li Dongna
- (Japan) Azusa Iwashimizu
- (Japan) Nahomi Kawasumi
- (Japan) Chinatsu Kira
- (Japan) Emi Nakajima
- (Japan) Mizuho Sakaguchi
- (Japan) Yūki Ōgimi
- (South Korea) Ji So-yun
- (Vietnam) Lê Thu Thanh Hương

1 goal

- (Australia) Lisa De Vanna
- (Australia) Caitlin Foord
- (Australia) Elise Kellond-Knight
- (China) Li Ying
- (China) Ma Xiaoxu
- (China) Ren Guixin
- (China) Xu Yanlu
- (Japan) Nanase Kiryu
- (Japan) Homare Sawa
- (Jordan) Stephanie Al-Naber
- (Jordan) Maysa Jbarah
- (South Korea) Kwon Hah-nul
- (South Korea) Park Hee-young
- (South Korea) Yeo Min-ji
- (South Korea) Yoo Young-a
- (Myanmar) Yee Yee Oo
- (Thailand) Sritala Duangnapa
- (Vietnam) Nguyễn Thị Muôn
- (Vietnam) Nguyễn Thị Tuyết Dung

1 own goal

- (Australia) Clare Polkinghorne (against Japan)
- (Jordan) Enshirah Alhyasat (against Japan)
- (South Korea) Park Eun-sun (against China PR)
- (Vietnam) Lê Thị Thương (against Australia)
