= 2016 Four Nations Tournament (women's football) =

Shenzhen International Tournament

Tournament details
- Host country: China
- City: Shenzhen
- Dates: 21–26 January 2016
- Teams: 4 (from 2 confederations)
- Venue(s): 1 (in 1 host city)

Final positions
- Champions: China (3rd title)
- Runners-up: Mexico
- Third place: South Korea
- Fourth place: Vietnam

Tournament statistics
- Matches played: 6
- Goals scored: 18 (3 per match)
- Top scorer(s): (China) Ma Xiaoxu (3 goals) (China) Wang Shanshan

The 2016 Four Nations Tournament was the 15th edition of the Four Nations Tournament, an invitational women's football tournament held in China.

== Participants ==
Team	FIFA Rankings (December 2015)
China (host)	17
South Korea	18
Mexico	26
Vietnam	29

== Venues ==
Foshan	Shenzhen Universiade Sports Centre is located in China
Shenzhen Universiade Sports Centre Stadium	Shenzhen Universiade Sports Centre is located in China
22.697139°N 114.212194°E	Shenzhen Universiade Sports Centre is located in China
Capacity: 60,334	Shenzhen Universiade Sports Centre is located in China

== Final standings ==
Team	Pld	W	D	L	GF	GA	GD	Pts
China	3	2	1	0	10	0	+10	7
Mexico	3	2	1	0	3	0	+3	7
South Korea	3	1	0	2	5	4	+1	3
Vietnam	3	0	0	3	0	14	−14	0

== Match results ==
21 January 2016
16:00 UTC+08:00

China	0–0	Mexico

Shenzhen Universiade Sports Centre, Foshan
Referee: Qin Liang (China)
21 January 2016
19:30 UTC+08:00

South Korea	5–0	Vietnam
Lee Min-a 14'; Lee Hyun-young 45+1'; Yoo Young-a 47'; Kim Soo-yun 52'; Lee So-dam 88'

Shenzhen Universiade Sports Centre, Foshan
Attendance: 100
Referee: Li Juan (China)

23 January 2016
16:00 UTC+08:00

Mexico	2–0	South Korea
Pérez 5'; Monsiváis 16'

Shenzhen Universiade Sports Centre, Foshan
23 January 2016
19:30 UTC+08:00

China	8–0	Vietnam
Zhang Rui 12', 53'; Zhao Xue 36'; Ma Xiaoxu 50', 89'; Wang Shanshan 65', 80'; Lou Jiahui 70'

Shenzhen Universiade Sports Centre, Foshan
Referee: Wang Jia (China)

26 January 2016
16:00 UTC+08:00

China	2–0	South Korea
Ma Xiaoxu 11'; Wang Shanshan 77'

Shenzhen Universiade Sports Centre, Foshan
Referee: Li Juan (China)
26 January 2016
19:30 UTC+08:00

Mexico	1–0	Vietnam
Domínguez 87'

Shenzhen Universiade Sports Centre, Foshan
