= 2018 AFC Women's Asian Cup =

كأس آسيا لكرة القدم للسيدات 2018

Tournament details
- Host country: Jordan
- City: Amman
- Dates: 6–20 April
- Teams: 8 (from 1 confederation)
- Venue: 2 (in 1 host city)

Final positions
- Champions: Japan (2nd title)
- Runners-up: Australia
- Third place: China
- Fourth place: Thailand

Tournament statistics
- Matches played: 17
- Goals scored: 66 (3.88 per match)
- Attendance: 31,537 (1,855 per match)
- Top scorer: (China) Li Ying (7 goals)
- Best player: (Japan) Mana Iwabuchi
- Fair play award: Japan

The 2018 AFC Women's Asian Cup was the 19th edition of the AFC Women's Asian Cup, the quadrennial international football tournament in Asia competed by the women's national teams in the Asian Football Confederation (AFC). It was originally scheduled to be held in Jordan between 7 and 22 April 2018, but later was changed to 6 to 20 April 2018.

The tournament served as the final stage of Asian qualification for the 2019 FIFA Women's World Cup, with the top five teams qualifying for the World Cup in France.

Japan defeated Australia 1–0 in the final to win their second consecutive title. In the third-place match the same day, China PR defeated Thailand 3–1.

== Qualification ==
The draw for the qualifiers was held on 21 January 2017. The top three finishers of the last AFC Women's Cup qualified automatically and did not have to enter qualifying, while Jordan also qualified automatically as hosts but decided to also participate in the qualifying competition. The matches were played from 3 to 12 April 2017.

=== Qualified teams ===
The following eight teams qualified for the tournament.

Team	Qualified as	Appearance	Previous best performance	FIFA ranking at start of event
Jordan	Hosts	2nd	Group stage (2014)	51
Japan	2014 champions	16th	Champions (2014)	11
Australia	2014 runners-up	6th	Champions (2010)	6
China	2014 third place	14th	Champions (1986, 1989, 1991, 1993, 1995, 1997, 1999, 2006)	17
Philippines	Group A runners-up (Note: Since the Group A winners Jordan already automatically qualified for the final tournament as hosts, Philippines also qualified for the final tournament as runners-up.)	9th	Group stage (1981, 1983, 1993, 1995, 1997, 1999, 2001, 2003)	72
South Korea	Group B winners	12th	Third place (2003)	16
Thailand	Group C winners	16th	Champions (1983)	30
Vietnam	Group D winners	8th	Group stage (1999, 2001, 2003, 2006, 2008, 2010, 2014)	35

== Venues ==
The competition was played in two venues in the city of Amman.

Amman	2018 AFC Women's Asian Cup is located in Amman	Amman
Amman International Stadium	2018 AFC Women's Asian Cup is located in Amman	King Abdullah II Stadium
Capacity: 17,619	2018 AFC Women's Asian Cup is located in Amman	Capacity: 13,000

== Draw ==
The final draw was held on 9 December 2017, 13:00 EET (UTC+2), at the King Hussein bin Talal Convention Center on the eastern shores of the Dead Sea. The eight teams were drawn into two groups of four teams. The teams were seeded according to their performance in the 2014 AFC Women's Asian Cup final tournament and qualification, with the hosts Jordan automatically seeded and assigned to Position A1 in the draw.

Pot 1	Pot 2	Pot 3	Pot 4
1. Jordan (hosts); 2. Japan	3. Australia; 4. China	5. South Korea; 6. Thailand	7. Vietnam; 8. Philippines

== Squads ==
Each team must register a squad of minimum 18 players and maximum 23 players, minimum three of whom must be goalkeepers (Regulations Articles 31.4 and 31.5).

== Match officials ==
A total of 10 referees and 12 assistant referees were appointed for the final tournament.

Referees

- (Australia) Kate Jacewicz
- (Australia) Casey Reibelt
- (China) Qin Liang
- (Iran) Mahsa Ghorbani
- (Japan) Yoshimi Yamashita
- (North Korea) Ri Hyang-ok
- (South Korea) Oh Hyeon-jeong
- (Myanmar) Thein Thein Aye
- (Uzbekistan) Edita Mirabidova
- (Vietnam) Công Thị Dung

Assistant referees

- (China) Cui Yongmei
- (China) Fang Yan
- (India) Uvena Fernandes
- (Iran) Ensieh Khabaz
- (Japan) Maiko Hagio
- (Japan) Naomi Teshirogi
- (North Korea) Hong Kum-nyo
- (South Korea) Kim Kyoung-min
- (South Korea) Lee Seul-gi
- (Palestine) Heba Saadieh
- (Singapore) Rohaidah Nasir
- (Vietnam) Trương Thị Lệ Trinh

== Group stage ==
The top two teams of each group qualified for the 2019 FIFA Women's World Cup as well as the semi-finals. The third-placed team of each group entered the fifth-placed match.

Tiebreakers

Teams are ranked according to points (3 points for a win, 1 point for a draw, 0 points for a loss), and if tied on points, the following tiebreaking criteria are applied, in the order given, to determine the rankings (Regulations Article 11.5):

1. Points in head-to-head matches among tied teams;
2. Goal difference in head-to-head matches among tied teams;
3. Goals scored in head-to-head matches among tied teams;
4. If more than two teams are tied, and after applying all head-to-head criteria above, a subset of teams are still tied, all head-to-head criteria above are reapplied exclusively to this subset of teams;
5. Goal difference in all group matches;
6. Goals scored in all group matches;
7. Penalty shoot-out if only two teams are tied and they met in the last round of the group;
8. Disciplinary points (yellow card = 1 point, red card as a result of two yellow cards = 3 points, direct red card = 3 points, yellow card followed by direct red card = 4 points);
9. Drawing of lots.

All times are local, AST (UTC+3).

Schedule
Matchday	Dates	Matches
Matchday 1	6–7 April 2018	1 v 4, 2 v 3
Matchday 2	9–10 April 2018	4 v 2, 3 v 1
Matchday 3	12–13 April 2018	1 v 2, 3 v 4

=== Group A ===
Pos	Team	Pld	W	D	L	GF	GA	GD	Pts	Qualification
1	China	3	3	0	0	15	1	+14	9	Knockout stage and 2019 FIFA Women's World Cup
2	Thailand	3	2	0	1	9	6	+3	6	Knockout stage and 2019 FIFA Women's World Cup
3	Philippines	3	1	0	2	3	7	−4	3	2019 FIFA Women's World Cup playoff
4	Jordan (H)	3	0	0	3	3	16	−13	0	

Source: AFC
Rules for classification: Group stage tiebreakers
(H) Hosts
6 April 2018
16:45

China	4–0	Thailand
Song Duan 56', 77'; Wang Shuang 63'; Li Ying 67'	Report

Amman International Stadium, Amman
Attendance: 5,060
Referee: Kate Jacewicz (Australia)
6 April 2018
20:00

Jordan	1–2	Philippines
Jbarah 15'	Report	Khair 51' (o.g.); Bolden 76'

Amman International Stadium, Amman
Attendance: 9,473
Referee: Ri Hyang-ok (North Korea)

9 April 2018
16:45

Philippines	0–3	China
	Report	Li Ying 17', 57'; Ma Jun 31'

King Abdullah II Stadium, Amman
Attendance: 226
Referee: Casey Reibelt (Australia)
9 April 2018
20:00

Thailand	6–1	Jordan
Suchawadee 1', 69'; Taneekarn 6'; Silawan 39'; Kanjana 41'; Pitsamai 90'	Report	Jebreen 43'

King Abdullah II Stadium, Amman
Attendance: 5,000
Referee: Yoshimi Yamashita (Japan)

12 April 2018
20:00

Jordan	1–8	China
Abu-Sabbah 17'	Report	Wang Shuang 14', 53', 84'; Khair 41' (o.g.); Song Duan 51'; Li Ying 60', 72' (pen.); Tang Jiali 86'

Amman International Stadium, Amman
Attendance: 4,428
Referee: Công Thị Dung (Vietnam)
12 April 2018
20:00

Thailand	3–1	Philippines
Kanjana 28' (pen.), 53'; Silawan 62'	Report	Shugg 90+3'

King Abdullah II Stadium, Amman
Attendance: 512
Referee: Oh Hyeon-jeong (South Korea)

=== Group B ===
Pos	Team	Pld	W	D	L	GF	GA	GD	Pts	Qualification
1	Australia	3	1	2	0	9	1	+8	5 (Note: Head-to-head results: Australia 0–0 South Korea, South Korea 0–0 Japan, Japan 1–1 Australia. Head-to-head standings: Australia: 2 pts, 0 GD, 1 GF; Japan: 2 pts, 0 GD, 1 GF; South Korea: 2 pts, 0 GD, 0 GF; South Korea are ranked third on head-to-head goals scored. Australia and Japan are tied on their own head-to-head result, and are ranked on total goal difference.)	Knockout stage and 2019 FIFA Women's World Cup
2	Japan	3	1	2	0	5	1	+4	5	Knockout stage and 2019 FIFA Women's World Cup
3	South Korea	3	1	2	0	4	0	+4	5	2019 FIFA Women's World Cup playoff
4	Vietnam	3	0	0	3	0	16	−16	0	

Source: AFC
Rules for classification: Group stage tiebreakers
Notes:
7 April 2018
16:45

Japan	4–0	Vietnam
Yokoyama 3'; Nakajima 17'; Iwabuchi 57'; Tanaka 66'	Report

King Abdullah II Stadium, Amman
Attendance: 142
Referee: Thein Thein Aye (Myanmar)
7 April 2018
20:00

Australia	0–0	South Korea
	Report

King Abdullah II Stadium, Amman
Attendance: 230
Referee: Qin Liang (China)

10 April 2018
16:45

South Korea	0–0	Japan
	Report

Amman International Stadium, Amman
Attendance: 356
Referee: Qin Liang (China)
10 April 2018
20:00

Vietnam	0–8	Australia
	Report	Simon 8'; Kennedy 18'; Logarzo 21'; Van Egmond 28'; Kerr 44', 51'; Nguyễn Thị Tuyết Dung 71' (o.g.); Raso 75'

Amman International Stadium, Amman
Attendance: 401
Referee: Edita Mirabidova (Uzbekistan)

13 April 2018
16:45

Japan	1–1	Australia
Mi. Sakaguchi 63'	Report	Kerr 86'

Amman International Stadium, Amman
Attendance: 446
Referee: Ri Hyang-ok (North Korea)
13 April 2018
16:45

South Korea	4–0	Vietnam
Cho So-hyun 14'; Lee Geum-min 38'; Lee Min-a 49', 73'	Report

King Abdullah II Stadium, Amman
Attendance: 86
Referee: Mahsa Ghorbani (Iran)

== Knockout stage ==
In the knockout stage, extra time and penalty shoot-out are used to decide the winner if necessary, except for the third place match where penalty shoot-out (no extra time) is used to decide the winner if necessary.

=== Bracket ===
Semi-finals
17 April – King Abdullah II
China	1
Japan	3
17 April – King Abdullah II
Australia (p)	2 (3)
Thailand	2 (1)

Final
20 April – Amman International
Japan	1
Australia	0
Third place match
20 April – Amman International
China	3
Thailand	1

Fifth place match
16 April – Amman International
Philippines	0
South Korea	5

=== Fifth place match ===
Winner qualified for 2019 FIFA Women's World Cup.

16 April 2018
20:00

Philippines	0–5	South Korea
	Report	Jang Sel-gi 34'; Lee Min-a 45+3'; Lim Seon-joo 56'; Cho So-hyun 66', 84' (pen.)

Amman International Stadium, Amman
Attendance: 418
Referee: Casey Reibelt (Australia)

=== Semi-finals ===
17 April 2018
16:45

Australia	2–2 (a.e.t.)	Thailand
Kanjanaporn 17' (o.g.); Kennedy 90+1'	Report	Kanjana 20'; Rattikan 63'
Penalties
Van Egmond (penalty missed); Kellond-Knight (penalty scored); De Vanna (penalty missed); Catley (penalty scored); Kerr (penalty scored)	3–1	(penalty scored) Ainon; (penalty missed) Sunisa; (penalty missed) Silawan; (penalty missed) Pitsamai

King Abdullah II Stadium, Amman
Attendance: 166
Referee: Edita Mirabidova (Uzbekistan)

17 April 2018
20:00

China	1–3	Japan
Li Ying 90' (pen.)	Report	Iwabuchi 39'; Yokoyama 85', 88' (pen.)

King Abdullah II Stadium, Amman
Attendance: 502
Referee: Ri Hyang-ok (North Korea)

=== Third place match ===
20 April 2018
16:45

China	3–1	Thailand
Li Ying 51'; Wang Shanshan 56'; Song Duan 61'	Report	Rattikan 81'

Amman International Stadium, Amman
Attendance: 1,026
Referee: Yoshimi Yamashita (Japan)

=== Final ===
20 April 2018
20:00

Japan	1–0	Australia
Yokoyama 84'	Report

Amman International Stadium, Amman
Attendance: 3,065
Referee: Ri Hyang-ok (North Korea)

== Awards ==
AFC Women's Asian Cup 2018 winners

Japan
Second title

The following awards were given at the conclusion of the tournament:

Most Valuable Player	Top Scorer	Fairplay Award
(Japan) Mana Iwabuchi	(China) Li Ying (7 goals)	Japan

== Goalscorers ==
There were 66 goals scored in 17 matches, for an average of 3.88 goals per match.

7 goals

- (China) Li Ying

4 goals

- (China) Song Duan
- (China) Wang Shuang
- (Japan) Kumi Yokoyama
- (Thailand) Kanjana Sung-Ngoen

3 goals

- (Australia) Sam Kerr
- (South Korea) Cho So-hyun
- (South Korea) Lee Min-a

2 goals

- (Australia) Alanna Kennedy
- (Japan) Mana Iwabuchi
- (Thailand) Rattikan Thongsombut
- (Thailand) Silawan Intamee
- (Thailand) Suchawadee Nildhamrong

1 goal

- (Australia) Chloe Logarzo
- (Australia) Hayley Raso
- (Australia) Kyah Simon
- (Australia) Emily van Egmond
- (China) Ma Jun
- (China) Tang Jiali
- (China) Wang Shanshan
- (Japan) Emi Nakajima
- (Japan) Mizuho Sakaguchi
- (Japan) Mina Tanaka
- (Jordan) Maysa Jbarah
- (Jordan) Shahnaz Jebreen
- (Jordan) Sarah Abu-Sabbah
- (Philippines) Sarina Bolden
- (Philippines) Jesse Shugg
- (South Korea) Jang Sel-gi
- (South Korea) Lee Geum-min
- (South Korea) Lim Seon-joo
- (Thailand) Pitsamai Sornsai
- (Thailand) Taneekarn Dangda

1 own goal

- (Thailand) Kanjanaporn Saenkhun (against Australia)
- (Vietnam) Nguyễn Thị Tuyết Dung (against Australia)

2 own goals

- (Jordan) Yasmeen Khair (against China PR and Philippines)

== Qualified teams for FIFA Women's World Cup ==
The following five teams from AFC qualified for the 2019 FIFA Women's World Cup.

Team	Qualified on	Previous appearances in FIFA Women's World Cup^{1}
China	9 April 2018	6 (1991, 1995, 1999, 2003, 2007, 2015)
Thailand	12 April 2018	1 (2015)
Australia	13 April 2018	6 (1995^{2}, 1999^{2}, 2003^{2}, 2007, 2011, 2015)
Japan	13 April 2018	7 (1991, 1995, 1999, 2003, 2007, **2011**, 2015)
South Korea	16 April 2018	2 (2003, 2015)

^{1} Bold indicates champions for that year. Italic indicates hosts for that year.
^{2} Australia qualified as a member of the OFC in 1995, 1999 and 2003.

== Broadcasting rights and sponsorships ==
Le Sports acquired the all-media broadcasting and signal production rights in China in 2015, but they collapsed due to financial problems thus giving in all the rights they've acquired and transferred them to China Central Television and PP Sports in 2017. Tire manufacturer Continental announced they would be official sponsor.
