= Century Lotus Stadium =

Multi-purpose stadium in Guangdong, China

Coordinates: 22°58′11″N 113°06′51″E

- 世纪莲
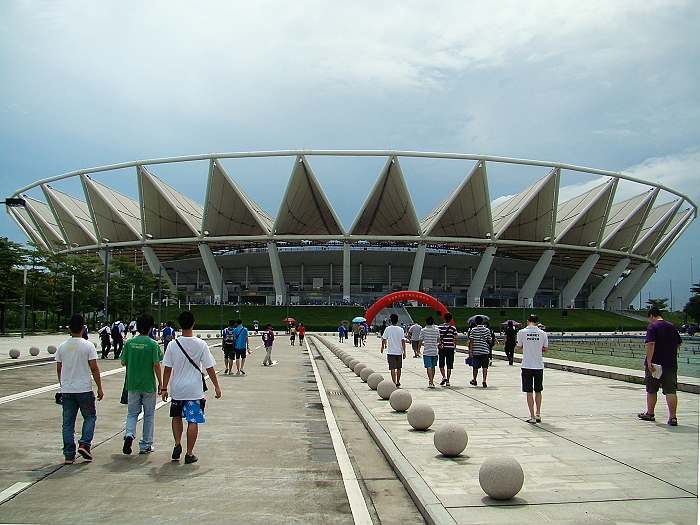
- Interactive map of Century Lotus Stadium
- Location: Foshan, Guangdong, China
- Owner: City of Foshan
- Capacity: 36,686
- Surface: Grass
- Public transit: Guangfo Shijilian

Construction
- Opened: 2006
- Cost: ¥ 939 million CNY
- Architect: Gerkan, Marg and Partners

Century Lotus Stadium
- Simplified Chinese: 佛山世纪莲体育中心
- Traditional Chinese: 佛山世紀蓮體育中心
Transcriptions
Standard Mandarin
- Hanyu Pinyin: Fóshān Shìjì Lián Tǐyù Zhōngxīn
Yue: Cantonese
- Jyutping: fat6 saan1 sai3 gei2 lin4 tai2 juk6 zung1 sam1

Century Lotus Stadium (Chinese: 世纪莲体育场) is a multi-purpose stadium in Foshan, Guangdong, China. It is currently used mostly for football matches. The stadium holds 36,686 people and was built in 2005. It hosted a first round match between China and Myanmar during 2010 FIFA World Cup qualifying. This building has a design similar to the reconstructed Jawaharlal Nehru Stadium, Delhi built by the same designers.

== Notable events ==
- Eason Chan - DUO World Tour - 30 September 2012
- Joker Xue - Skyscraper World Tour - 26 August 2018

== See also ==
- New Plaza Stadium
