= Yongchuan Sports Center =

Sports venue in Chongqing, China

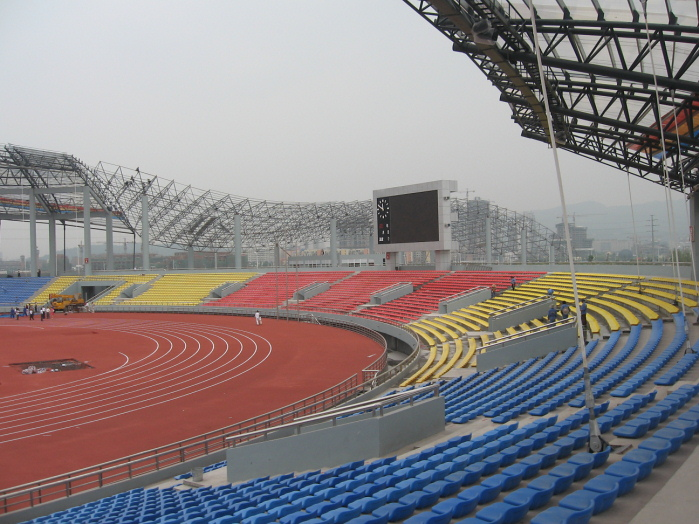
- Interactive map of Yongchuan Sports Center
- Full name: 中国重庆市永川体育中心 (China, Chongqing city, Yongchuan Physical Training Center)
- Location: Yongchuan, Chongqing, China
- Coordinates: 29°20′45″N 105°56′1″E
- Owner: City of Chongqing
- Operator: 重庆市体育局 Chongqing City Physical Training Office
- Capacity: 25,017
- Surface: natural grass
- Acreage: 19.47 hectares

Construction
- Built: 2007 (main stadium)
- Opened: December, 2007 (main stadium)
- Cost: 139 million yuan
- Structural engineer: Chongqing Vister Construction Engineering Technology Company
- General contractor: Chongqing Vister Construction Engineering Technology Company

Yongchuan Sports Center (Chinese: 中国重庆市永川体育中心) is a multi-sports facility located in Yongchuan District of Chongqing Municipality in China. The multi-purpose main stadium, Yongchuan Stadium, has a natural grass surface for association football, with a standard running track around it. The sports center includes a standard swimming pool with 500 seats gallery, six tennis courts, six basketball courts, four gateball courts and related facilities. The site covers an area of 19.47 hectares and the total cost was 139 million yuan. Expansion is planned for 10 badminton courts.

== Construction ==
The main stadium was engineered and built by Chongqing Vister Construction Engineering Technology Company; construction was completed in 2007.

The main stadium is built with mild steel and color sheets supported by truss frame. It is protected from the weather by anti-corrosion and paint. Total area of main stadium is 23,000 square meters.

== Recent events ==
Events held at the Yongchuan Stadium:

- 2013 Four Nations Tournament (women's football)
- 2011 Four Nations Tournament (women's football)
- 2008 East Asian Women's Football Championship
