= Thailand women's national football team results =

This article lists the results and fixtures for the Thailand women's national football team.

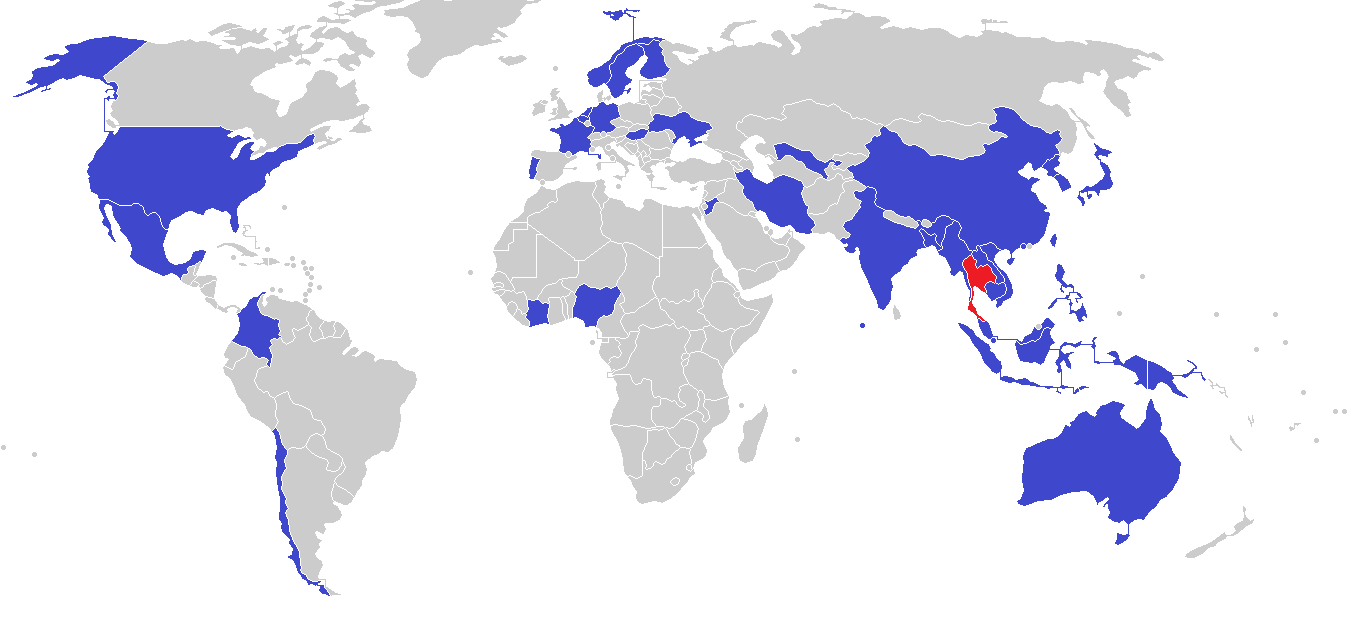
Opponents of Thailand women's national football team, as of December 2021

== Results and upcoming fixtures ==
Win Draw Lose

=== 1995 ===
Date	Tournament	Opponent	Result	Score	Location
23 September 1995	1995 AFC Women's Championship Group B	Chinese Taipei	L	0–3	Sabah, Malaysia
27 September 1995	1995 AFC Women's Championship Group B	Malaysia	W	3–1	Sabah, Malaysia
3 December 1995	1995 Southeast Asian Games	Malaysia	W	1–0	San Pa Tong District Stadium, Chiang Mai, Thailand
5 December 1995	1995 Southeast Asian Games	Singapore	W	4–0	San Pa Tong District Stadium, Chiang Mai, Thailand
7 December 1995	1995 Southeast Asian Games	Philippines	W	7–0	San Pa Tong District Stadium, Chiang Mai, Thailand
9 December 1995	1995 Southeast Asian Games	Myanmar	D	3–3	San Pa Tong District Stadium, Chiang Mai, Thailand
13 December 1995	1995 Southeast Asian Games Gold medal match	Malaysia	W	1–0	700th Anniversary Stadium, Chiang Mai, Thailand

=== 1997 ===
Date	Tournament	Opponent	Result	Score	Location
7 October 1997	1997 Southeast Asian Games Group A	Vietnam	W	3–2	Pajajaran Stadium, Bogor, Indonesia
12 October 1997	1997 Southeast Asian Games Group A	Philippines	W	1–0	Pajajaran Stadium, Bogor, Indonesia
14 October 1997	1997 Southeast Asian Games Semi-finals	Indonesia	W	2–0	Pajajaran Stadium, Bogor, Indonesia
12 September 2001	1997 Southeast Asian Games Gold medal match	Myanmar	W	5–1	Senayan Stadium, Jakarta, Indonesia

=== 1998 ===
Date	Tournament	Opponent	Result	Score	Location
8 December 1998	1998 Asian Games Group A	Japan	L	0–6	Thupatemi Stadium, Pathum Thani, Thailand
10 December 1998	1998 Asian Games Group A	Vietnam	D	1–1	Thupatemi Stadium, Pathum Thani, Thailand
12 December 1998	1998 Asian Games Group A	North Korea	L	0–15	Thai-Japanese Stadium, Bangkok, Thailand

=== 1999 ===
Date	Tournament	Opponent	Result	Score	Location
8 November 1999	1999 AFC Women's Championship Group C	Japan	L	0–9	Iloilo Sports Complex, Iloilo City, Philippines
10 November 1999	1999 AFC Women's Championship Group C	Nepal	W	5–0	Iloilo Sports Complex, Iloilo City, Philippines
14 November 1999	1999 AFC Women's Championship Group C	Uzbekistan	L	0–1	Barotac Nuevo, Philippines
16 November 1999	1999 AFC Women's Championship Group C	Philippines	W	1–0	Iloilo Sports Complex, Iloilo City, Philippines

=== 2001 ===
Date	Tournament	Opponent	Result	Score	Location
4 September 2001	2001 Southeast Asian Games Group A	Philippines	W	4–0	Cheras Stadium, Kuala Lumpur, Malaysia
6 September 2001	2001 Southeast Asian Games Group A	Malaysia	W	2–1	Cheras Stadium, Kuala Lumpur, Malaysia
10 September 2001	2001 Southeast Asian Games Group A	Myanmar	D	1–1	Cheras Stadium, Kuala Lumpur, Malaysia
12 September 2001	2001 Southeast Asian Games Semi-finals	Indonesia	W	2–0	Cheras Stadium, Kuala Lumpur, Malaysia
14 September 2001	2001 Southeast Asian Games Gold medal match	Vietnam	L	0–4	Cheras Stadium, Kuala Lumpur, Malaysia
6 December 2001	2001 AFC Women's Championship	Malaysia	W	4–0	Chungshan Soccer Stadium, Taipei, Taiwan
8 December 2001	2001 AFC Women's Championship	South Korea	L	0–5	Taipei Municipal Stadium, Taipei, Taiwan
10 December 2001	2001 AFC Women's Championship	India	W	1–0	Taiwan
12 December 2001	2001 AFC Women's Championship	South Korea	L	0–4	Taipei Municipal Stadium, Taipei, Taiwan

=== 2003 ===
Date	Tournament	Opponent	Result	Score	Location
8 June 2003	2003 AFC Women's Championship	Singapore	W	3–0	Rajamangala Stadium, Bangkok, Thailand
10 June 2003	2003 AFC Women's Championship	South Korea	L	0–6	Rajamangala Stadium, Bangkok, Thailand
12 June 2003	2003 AFC Women's Championship	North Korea	L	0–14	Rajamangala Stadium, Bangkok, Thailand
14 June 2003	2003 AFC Women's Championship	Hong Kong	W	3–1	Rajamangala Stadium, Bangkok, Thailand
2 December 2003	2003 Southeast Asian Games Group B	Myanmar	L	2–4	Thiên Trường Stadium, Nam Định, Vietnam
6 December 2003	2003 Southeast Asian Games Group B	Singapore	W	2–0	Thiên Trường Stadium, Nam Định, Vietnam
8 December 2003	2003 Southeast Asian Games Semi-finals	Vietnam	L	1–3	Lạch Tray Stadium, Hai Phong, Vietnam
11 December 2003	2003 Southeast Asian Games Bronze medal match	Malaysia	W	6–1	Lạch Tray Stadium, Hai Phong, Vietnam

=== 2004 ===
Date	Tournament	Opponent	Result	Score	Location
20 April 2004	2004 Summer Olympics Women's qualification	Vietnam	D	0–0	Komazawa Olympic Park Stadium, Tokyo, Japan
22 April 2004	2004 Summer Olympics Women's qualification	Japan	L	0–6	National Stadium, Tokyo, Japan

=== 2005 ===
Date	Tournament	Opponent	Result	Score	Location
15 June 2005	2006 AFC Women's Asian Cup qualification	Singapore	W	5–1	Mỹ Đình National Stadium, Hanoi, Vietnam
17 June 2005	2006 AFC Women's Asian Cup qualification	Indonesia	W	4–0	Mỹ Đình National Stadium, Hanoi, Vietnam
20 June 2005	2006 AFC Women's Asian Cup qualification	India	W	3–2	Mỹ Đình National Stadium, Hanoi, Vietnam
22 November 2005	2005 Southeast Asian Games	Indonesia	W	2–1	Marikina Sports Complex, Marikina, Philippines
24 November 2005	2005 Southeast Asian Games	Philippines	W	1–0	Marikina Sports Complex, Marikina, Philippines
26 November 2005	2005 Southeast Asian Games	Vietnam	L	0–1	Marikina Sports Complex, Marikina, Philippines
28 November 2005	2005 Southeast Asian Games	Myanmar	L	1–2	Marikina Sports Complex, Marikina, Philippines

=== 2006 ===
Date	Tournament	Opponent	Result	Score	Location
29 May 2006	2006 AFF Women's Championship	Myanmar	W	3–2	Thanh Long Sports Centre, Ho Chi Minh City, Vietnam
31 May 2006	2006 AFF Women's Championship	Vietnam	L	2–3	Thanh Long Sports Centre, Ho Chi Minh City, Vietnam
2 June 2006	2006 AFF Women's Championship	Chinese Taipei	D	1–1	Thanh Long Sports Centre, Ho Chi Minh City, Vietnam
16 July 2006	2006 AFC Women's Asian Cup Group B	Myanmar	W	2–1	Hindmarsh Stadium, Adelaide, Australia
18 July 2006	2006 AFC Women's Asian Cup Group B	North Korea	L	0–9	Hindmarsh Stadium, Adelaide, Australia
20 July 2006	2006 AFC Women's Asian Cup Group B	South Korea	L	0–11	Hindmarsh Stadium, Adelaide, Australia
24 July 2006	2006 AFC Women's Asian Cup Group B	Australia	L	0–5	Marden Sports Complex, Adelaide, Australia
30 November 2006	2006 Asian Games Group A	China	L	0–7	Al-Arabi Stadium, Doha, Qatar
4 December 2006	2006 Asian Games Group A	Japan	L	0–4	Al-Gharrafa Stadium, Al Rayyan, Qatar
7 December 2006	2006 Asian Games Group A	Jordan	W	5–0	Al-Arabi Stadium, Doha, Qatar

=== 2007 ===
Date	Tournament	Opponent	Result	Score	Location
15 February 2007	Friendly match	Uzbekistan	W	2–1	Bangkok, Thailand
19 February 2007	2008 AFC Women's Olympic Qualifying Tournament	Vietnam	W	1–0	Thai-Japanese Stadium, Bangkok, Thailand
21 February 2007	2008 AFC Women's Olympic Qualifying Tournament	Singapore	W	5–0	Thai-Japanese Stadium, Bangkok, Thailand
23 February 2007	2008 AFC Women's Olympic Qualifying Tournament	Maldives	W	9–0	Thai-Japanese Stadium, Bangkok, Thailand
7 April 2007	2008 AFC Women's Olympic Qualifying Tournament	South Korea	W	1–0	Ansan Wa~ Stadium, Ansan, South Korea
15 April 2007	2008 AFC Women's Olympic Qualifying Tournament	Japan	L	0–4	Thai Army Sports Stadium, Bangkok, Thailand
3 June 2007	2008 AFC Women's Olympic Qualifying Tournament	Vietnam	L	0–1	Lạch Tray Stadium, Hai Phong, Vietnam
10 June 2007	2008 AFC Women's Olympic Qualifying Tournament	Vietnam	W	5–0	Rajamangala Stadium, Bangkok, Thailand
1 July 2007	2007 Good Luck Beijing	China	L	0–4	Qinhuangdao, China
4 July 2007	2007 Good Luck Beijing	Italy	L	0–5	Shenyang, China
7 July 2007	2007 Good Luck Beijing	Mexico	L	0–6	Qinhuangdao, China
10 July 2007	2007 Good Luck Beijing Third Place Match	Italy	L	1–2	Shenyang, China
4 August 2007	2008 AFC Women's Olympic Qualifying Tournament	South Korea	D	1–1	Thai-Japanese Stadium, Bangkok, Thailand
12 August 2007	2008 AFC Women's Olympic Qualifying Tournament	Japan	L	0–5	National Olympic Stadium, Tokyo, Japan
6 September 2007	2007 AFF Women's Championship Group B	Laos	W	13–1	Thuwunna Stadium, Yangon, Myanmar
8 September 2007	2007 AFF Women's Championship Group B	Singapore	W	8–0	Thuwunna Stadium, Yangon, Myanmar
10 September 2007	2007 AFF Women's Championship Group B	Myanmar	L	0–1	Thuwunna Stadium, Yangon, Myanmar
13 September 2007	2007 AFF Women's Championship Semi-finals	Vietnam	W	3–0	Thuwunna Stadium, Yangon, Myanmar
15 September 2007	2007 AFF Women's Championship Final	Myanmar	D	0–0 (a.e.t.); 1–4 (pen.)	Thuwunna Stadium, Yangon, Myanmar
2 December 2007	2007 Southeast Asian Games Group B	Malaysia	W	6–0	Municipality of Tumbon Mueangpug Stadium, Nakhon Ratchasima, Thailand
7 December 2007	2007 Southeast Asian Games Group B	Myanmar	D	2–2	Municipality of Tumbon Mueangpug Stadium, Nakhon Ratchasima, Thailand
10 December 2007	2007 Southeast Asian Games Semi-finals	Laos	W	8–0	Municipality of Tumbon Mueangpug Stadium, Nakhon Ratchasima, Thailand
10 December 2007	2007 Southeast Asian Games Final	Vietnam	W	2–0	Municipal Stadium, Nakhon Ratchasima, Thailand

=== 2008 ===
Date	Tournament	Opponent	Result	Score	Location
24 March 2008	2008 AFC Women's Asian Cup qualification	Malaysia	W	11–0	80th Birthday Stadium, Nakhon Ratchasima, Thailand
26 March 2008	2008 AFC Women's Asian Cup qualification	Philippines	W	9–0	80th Birthday Stadium, Nakhon Ratchasima, Thailand
28 March 2008	2008 AFC Women's Asian Cup qualification	South Korea	L	0–4	80th Birthday Stadium, Nakhon Ratchasima, Thailand
28 May 2008	2008 AFC Women's Asian Cup Group A	North Korea	L	0–5	Thống Nhất Stadium, Ho Chi Minh City, Vietnam
30 May 2008	2008 AFC Women's Asian Cup Group A	China	L	1–5	Thống Nhất Stadium, Ho Chi Minh City, Vietnam
1 June 2008	2008 AFC Women's Asian Cup Group A	Vietnam	L	0–1	Thống Nhất Stadium, Ho Chi Minh City, Vietnam
9 October 2008	2008 AFF Women's Championship Group B	Australia	L	0–2	Thanh Long Sports Centre, Ho Chi Minh City, Vietnam
11 October 2008	2008 AFF Women's Championship Group B	Singapore	W	6–0	Thanh Long Sports Centre, Ho Chi Minh City, Vietnam
13 October 2008	2008 AFF Women's Championship Group B	Philippines	W	12–0	Thanh Long Sports Centre, Ho Chi Minh City, Vietnam
18 October 2008	2008 AFF Women's Championship Semi-finals	Vietnam	L	1–2	Thanh Long Sports Centre, Ho Chi Minh City, Vietnam
20 October 2008	2008 AFF Women's Championship Third place match	Myanmar	W	3–0	Thanh Long Sports Centre, Ho Chi Minh City, Vietnam

=== 2009 ===
Date	Tournament	Opponent	Result	Score	Location
4 July 2009	2010 AFC Women's Asian Cup qualification	Uzbekistan	W	6–1	Rajamangala Stadium, Bangkok, Thailand
8 July 2009	2010 AFC Women's Asian Cup qualification	Iran	W	8–1	Rajamangala Stadium, Bangkok, Thailand
20 October 2009	Friendly match	Laos	W	5–0	Cẩm Phả Stadium, Cẩm Phả, Vietnam
23 October 2009	Friendly match	Vietnam	L	0–2	Cẩm Phả Stadium, Cẩm Phả, Vietnam
4 December 2009	2009 Southeast Asian Games	Malaysia	W	14–0	National University of Laos Stadium, Vientiane, Laos
6 December 2009	2009 Southeast Asian Games	Myanmar	D	2–2	National University of Laos Stadium, Vientiane, Laos
8 December 2009	2009 Southeast Asian Games	Laos	W	4–1	National University of Laos Stadium, Vientiane, Laos
11 December 2009	2009 Southeast Asian Games	Vietnam	D	2–2	National University of Laos Stadium, Vientiane, Laos
16 December 2009	2009 Southeast Asian Games Final	Vietnam	D	0–0 (a.e.t.); 0–3 (pen.)	Laos National Stadium, Vientiane, Laos

=== 2010 ===
Date	Tournament	Opponent	Result	Score	Location
20 May 2010	2010 AFC Women's Asian Cup Group A	North Korea	L	0–3	Chengdu Sports Center, Chengdu, China
22 May 2010	2010 AFC Women's Asian Cup Group A	Japan	L	0–4	Chengdu Sports Center, Chengdu, China
24 May 2010	2010 AFC Women's Asian Cup Group A	Myanmar	W	2–0	Shuangliu Sports Centre Stadium, Chengdu, China
14 November 2010	2010 Asian Games Group B	Japan	L	0–4	Huangpu Sports Center, Guangzhou, China
16 November 2010	2010 Asian Games Group B	North Korea	L	0–2	Huangpu Sports Center, Guangzhou, China

=== 2011 ===
Date	Tournament	Opponent	Result	Score	Location
20 March 2011	2012 AFC Women's Olympic Qualifying Tournament	Chinese Taipei	W	3–0	National Stadium, Kaohsiung, Taiwan
22 March 2011	2012 AFC Women's Olympic Qualifying Tournament	Myanmar	W	2–0	National Stadium, Kaohsiung, Taiwan
25 March 2011	2012 AFC Women's Olympic Qualifying Tournament	Vietnam	L	0–1	National Stadium, Kaohsiung, Taiwan
27 March 2011	2012 AFC Women's Olympic Qualifying Tournament	Hong Kong	W	4–0	National Stadium, Kaohsiung, Taiwan
3 June 2011	2012 AFC Women's Olympic Qualifying Tournament	Uzbekistan	W	5–1	Amman International Stadium, Amman, Jordan
10 June 2011	2012 AFC Women's Olympic Qualifying Tournament	Jordan	W	7–0	Amman International Stadium, Amman, Jordan
12 June 2011	2012 AFC Women's Olympic Qualifying Tournament	Vietnam	D	3–3	Amman International Stadium, Amman, Jordan
1 September 2011	2012 AFC Women's Olympic Qualifying Tournament	Japan	L	0–3	Shandong Provincial Stadium, Jinan, China
3 September 2011	2012 AFC Women's Olympic Qualifying Tournament	Australia	L	1–5	Jinan Olympic Sports Center, Jinan, China
5 September 2011	2012 AFC Women's Olympic Qualifying Tournament	China	L	0–2	Shandong Provincial Stadium, Jinan, China
8 September 2011	2012 AFC Women's Olympic Qualifying Tournament	South Korea	L	0–3	Jinan Olympic Sports Center, Jinan, China
11 September 2011	2012 AFC Women's Olympic Qualifying Tournament	North Korea	L	0–5	Jinan Olympic Sports Center, Jinan, China
17 October 2011	2011 AFF Women's Championship Group B	Malaysia	W	8–1	New Laos National Stadium, Vientiane, Laos
19 October 2011	2011 AFF Women's Championship Group B	Philippines	W	5–1	New Laos National Stadium, Vientiane, Laos
21 October 2011	2011 AFF Women's Championship Group B	Myanmar	W	3–1	Chao Anouvong Stadium, Vientiane, Laos
23 October 2011	2011 AFF Women's Championship Semi-finals	Laos	W	4–0	New Laos National Stadium, Vientiane, Laos
25 October 2011	2011 AFF Women's Championship Final	Myanmar	W	2–1	New Laos National Stadium, Vientiane, Laos

=== 2012 ===
Date	Tournament	Opponent	Result	Score	Location
14 September 2012	2012 AFF Women's Championship Group B	Malaysia	W	4–0	Thong Nhat Stadium, Ho Chi Minh City, Vietnam
18 September 2012	2012 AFF Women's Championship Group B	Laos	W	3–0	Thong Nhat Stadium, Ho Chi Minh City, Vietnam
20 September 2012	2012 AFF Women's Championship Semi-finals	Myanmar	L	0–1	Thong Nhat Stadium, Ho Chi Minh City, Vietnam
22 September 2012	2012 AFF Women's Championship Third place play-off	Laos	W	14–1	Thong Nhat Stadium, Ho Chi Minh City, Vietnam

=== 2013 ===
Date	Tournament	Opponent	Result	Score	Location
21 May 2013	2014 AFC Women's Asian Cup qualification	Bangladesh	W	9–0	Bangabandhu National Stadium, Dhaka, Bangladesh
23 May 2013	2014 AFC Women's Asian Cup qualification	Philippines	W	1–0	Bangabandhu National Stadium, Dhaka, Bangladesh
25 May 2013	2014 AFC Women's Asian Cup qualification	Iran	W	5–1	Bangabandhu National Stadium, Dhaka, Bangladesh
11 July 2013	Friendly match	Malaysia	L	1–2	Ramkhamhaeng University Stadium, Bangkok, Thailand
13 July 2013	Friendly match	Malaysia	W	3–0	Ramkhamhaeng University Stadium, Bangkok, Thailand
9 September 2013	2013 AFF Women's Championship Group A	Vietnam	D	0–0	Thuwunna Stadium, Yangon, Myanmar
11 September 2013	2013 AFF Women's Championship Group A	Jordan	W	4–0	Thuwunna Stadium, Yangon, Myanmar
15 September 2013	2013 AFF Women's Championship Group A	Australia U20	L	2–3	Thuwunna Stadium, Yangon, Myanmar
17 September 2013	2013 AFF Women's Championship Group A	Malaysia	W	6–0	Aung San Stadium, Yangon, Myanmar
14 December 2013	2013 Southeast Asian Games Group B	Malaysia	W	6–1	Mandalarthiri Stadium, Mandalay, Myanmar
16 December 2013	2013 Southeast Asian Games Group B	Laos	W	5–0	Mandalarthiri Stadium, Mandalay, Myanmar
18 December 2013	2013 Southeast Asian Games Semi-finals	Myanmar	D	2–2 (a.e.t.); 9–8 (pen.)	Mandalarthiri Stadium, Mandalay, Myanmar
20 December 2013	2013 Southeast Asian Games Final	Vietnam	W	2–1	Mandalarthiri Stadium, Mandalay, Myanmar

=== 2014 ===
Date	Tournament	Opponent	Result	Score	Location
15 May 2014	2014 AFC Women's Asian Cup Group B	China	L	0–7	Thống Nhất Stadium, Ho Chi Minh City, Vietnam
17 May 2014	2014 AFC Women's Asian Cup Group B	South Korea	L	0–4	Thống Nhất Stadium, Ho Chi Minh City, Vietnam
19 May 2014	2014 AFC Women's Asian Cup Group B	Myanmar	W	2–1	Thống Nhất Stadium, Ho Chi Minh City, Vietnam
21 May 2014	2014 AFC Women's Asian Cup Fifth place play-off	Vietnam	W	2–1	Thống Nhất Stadium, Ho Chi Minh City, Vietnam
27 July 2014	Friendly match	Myanmar	L	0–1	Thuwunna Stadium, Yangon, Myanmar
9 September 2014	Friendly match	China	D	2–2	Beijing Olympic Centre, Beijing, China
14 September 2014	2014 Asian Games Group A	South Korea	L	0–5	Namdong Asiad Rugby Field, Incheon, South Korea
17 September 2014	2014 Asian Games Group A	Maldives	W	10–0	Namdong Asiad Rugby Field, Incheon, South Korea
21 September 2014	2014 Asian Games Group A	India	W	10–0	Namdong Asiad Rugby Field, Incheon, South Korea
26 September 2014	2014 Asian Games Quarterfinals	Vietnam	L	1–2	Goyang Stadium, Incheon, South Korea

=== 2015 ===
Date	Tournament	Opponent	Result	Score	Location
8 February 2015	Friendly match	Netherlands	L	0–7	Polman Stadion, Almelo, Netherlands
11 February 2015	Friendly match^{1}	(Netherlands) PSV Eindhoven	L	1–2	Sport De Heikant, Maastricht, Netherlands
14 February 2015	Friendly match^{1}	(Belgium) Standard	L	1–3	Youth Complex Standard, Liège, Belgium
17 February 2015	Friendly match^{1}	(Netherlands) AFC Ajax	L	0–3	De Geusselt, Maastricht, Netherlands
23 February 2015	Friendly match^{1}	(Germany) SGS Essen	W	2–1	Stadion Essen, Essen, Germany
26 February 2015	Friendly match^{1}	(Netherlands) Fortuna Sittard	D	1–1	Fortuna Sittard Stadion, Sittard, Netherlands
12 March 2015	Friendly match	Papua New Guinea	W	11–1	Leo Stadium, Pathum Thani, Thailand
14 March 2015	Friendly match	Papua New Guinea	W	7–0	Supachalasai Stadium, Bangkok, Thailand
18 April 2015	Friendly match	Malaysia	W	5–0	PAT Stadium, Bangkok, Thailand
26 April 2015	Friendly match	Myanmar	D	2–2	PAT Stadium, Bangkok, Thailand
1 May 2015	2015 AFF Women's Championship Group A^{1}	Australia U20	L	0–3	Thống Nhất Stadium, Ho Chi Minh City, Vietnam
3 May 2015	2015 AFF Women's Championship Group A	Indonesia	W	10–1	Thống Nhất Stadium, Ho Chi Minh City, Vietnam
5 May 2015	2015 AFF Women's Championship Group A	Laos	W	12–0	Thống Nhất Stadium, Ho Chi Minh City, Vietnam
8 May 2015	2015 AFF Women's Championship Semi-finals	Vietnam	W	2–1	Thống Nhất Stadium, Ho Chi Minh City, Vietnam
10 May 2015	2015 AFF Women's Championship Final	Myanmar	W	3–2	Thống Nhất Stadium, Ho Chi Minh City, Vietnam
7 June 2015	2015 FIFA Women's World Cup Group B	Norway	L	0–4	Lansdowne Stadium, Ottawa, Canada
11 June 2015	2015 FIFA Women's World Cup Group B	Ivory Coast	W	3–2	Lansdowne Stadium, Ottawa, Canada
15 June 2015	2015 FIFA Women's World Cup Group B	Germany	L	0–4	Winnipeg Stadium, Winnipeg, Canada
16 September 2015	2016 AFC Women's Olympic Qualifying Tournament	Myanmar	W	2–1	Mandalarthiri Stadium, Mandalay, Myanmar
18 September 2015	2016 AFC Women's Olympic Qualifying Tournament	Jordan	W	1–0	Mandalarthiri Stadium, Mandalay, Myanmar
20 September 2015	2016 AFC Women's Olympic Qualifying Tournament	Chinese Taipei	D	0–0	Mandalarthiri Stadium, Mandalay, Myanmar
22 September 2015	2016 AFC Women's Olympic Qualifying Tournament	Vietnam	L	0–2	Mandalarthiri Stadium, Mandalay, Myanmar

- ^{1} Non FIFA 'A' international match

=== 2016 ===
Date	Tournament	Opponent	Result	Score	Location
2 June 2016	Friendly match	China	L	0–6	Kunshan Stadium, Kunshan, China
5 June 2016	Friendly match	China	L	0–3	Changzhou Olympic Sports Center, Changzhou, China
9 July 2016	Friendly match	Myanmar	L	0–1	Mandalarthiri Stadium, Mandalay, Myanmar
26 July 2016	2016 AFF Women's Championship Group A	Philippines	W	4–0	Mandalarthiri Stadium, Mandalay, Myanmar
28 July 2016	2016 AFF Women's Championship Group A	Singapore	W	8–0	Mandalarthiri Stadium, Mandalay, Myanmar
30 July 2016	2016 AFF Women's Championship Group A	Vietnam	L	0–2	Mandalarthiri Stadium, Mandalay, Myanmar
2 August 2016	2016 AFF Women's Championship Semi-finals^{1}	Australia U20	W	2–1	Mandalarthiri Stadium, Mandalay, Myanmar
4 August 2016	2016 AFF Women's Championship Final	Vietnam	D	1–1 (a.e.t.); 6–5 (pen.)	Mandalarthiri Stadium, Mandalay, Myanmar
15 September 2016	Friendly match	United States	L	0–9	Mapfre Stadium, Columbus, Ohio, United States
17 September 2016	Friendly match^{1}	(United States) Western New York Flash	D	0–0	Demske Sports Complex, Buffalo, New York, United States
5 October 2016	Friendly match	Chinese Taipei	W	5–2	National Stadium, Kaohsiung, Taiwan
14 December 2016	Friendly match^{1}	(New Zealand) Northern Football Federation	L	2–3	North Harbour Stadium, Auckland, New Zealand
17 December 2016	Friendly match^{1}	New Zealand	L	0–2	Mount Smart Stadium, Auckland, New Zealand
20 December 2016	Friendly match^{1}	New Zealand	L	1–3	Fred Taylor Park, Auckland, New Zealand

- ^{1} Non FIFA 'A' international match

=== 2017 ===
19 January 2017 2017 Four Nations Tournament	China	2–0	Thailand	Foshan, China
19:35 UTC+08	Wang Shuang 21'; Lou Jiahui 90+3'	Report		Stadium: Century Lotus Stadium; Referee: Yu Hong (China)

21 January 2017 2017 Four Nations Tournament	Ukraine	0–1	Thailand	Foshan, China
19:35 UTC+08		Report	Orathai 39'	Stadium: Century Lotus Stadium

24 January 2017 2017 Four Nations Tournament	Thailand	3–0	Myanmar	Foshan, China
16:00 UTC+08:00	Kanjana 21', 45+2'; Taneekarn 58'	Report		Stadium: Century Lotus Stadium

1 March 2017 Friendly match	Myanmar	0–0	Thailand	Mandalay, Myanmar
17.30 UTC+06:30		Report		Stadium: Mandalarthiri Stadium

3 March 2017 Friendly match^{1}	Myanmar	0–3	Thailand	Mandalay, Myanmar
17.30 UTC+06:30		Report		Stadium: Mandalarthiri Stadium

3 April 2017 2018 AFC Women's Asian Cup qualification	Palestine	0–6	Thailand	Al-Ram, Palestine
16.00 UTC+03:00		Report	Kanjana 7'; Al-Sarras 19' (o.g.); Taneekarn 26'; Suchawadee 64'; Orathai 73'; Rattikan 76'	Stadium: Faisal Al-Husseini International Stadium; Attendance: 500; Referee: Kate Jacewicz (Australia)

7 April 2017 2018 AFC Women's Asian Cup qualification	Thailand	1–0	Chinese Taipei	Al-Ram, Palestine
16.00 UTC+03:00	Suchawadee 3'	Report		Stadium: Faisal Al-Husseini International Stadium; Attendance: 120; Referee: Kate Jacewicz (Australia)

10 June 2017 Friendly match	Thailand	4–1	Chinese Taipei	Bangkok, Thailand
18.00 UTC+07:00	Taneekarn 73'; Kanjana 82', 83'; Pitsamai 90'	report report	Lai Li-chin 16'	Stadium: PAT Stadium; Referee: Pansa Chaisanit (Thailand)

15 August 2017 2017 Southeast Asian Games	Thailand	3–2	Myanmar	Kuala Lumpur, Malaysia
16.00 UTC+08:00	Rattikan 65', 71'; Orathai 88'	Report	Win Theingi Tun 23', 77'	Stadium: UM Arena Stadium; Referee: Kim Jye Hye (South Korea)

20 August 2017 2017 Southeast Asian Games	Thailand	6–0	Malaysia	Shah Alam, Malaysia
20:45 UTC+08:00	Orathai 19', 57'; Nisa 54'; Naphat 58'; Saowalak 60'; Taneekarn 90+1'	Report		Stadium: UiTM Stadium; Referee: Ashmita Manandhar (Nepal)

22 August 2017 2017 Southeast Asian Games	Vietnam	1–1	Thailand	Shah Alam, Malaysia
16:00 UTC+08:00	Phạm Hải Yến 11'	Report	Rattikan 41'	Stadium: UiTM Stadium; Referee: Choki Om (Bhutan)

24 August 2017 2017 Southeast Asian Games	Thailand	3–1	Philippines	Shah Alam, Malaysia
16:00 UTC+08:00	Rattikan 38'; Nisa 67'; Pitsamai 72'	Report	Long 90+1'	Stadium: UiTM Stadium; Referee: Ashmita Manandhar (Nepal)

25 November 2017 Friendly match	Thailand	0–0	New Zealand	Bangkok, Thailand
17:00 UTC+07:00				Stadium: PAT Stadium

28 November 2017 Friendly match	Thailand	0–5	New Zealand	Nonthaburi, Thailand
17:00 UTC+07:00		source	Hearn 24'; Bowen 33'; Percival 53' (pen.), 75' (pen.); Longo 67'	Stadium: SCG Stadium

9 December 2017 Friendly match	Thailand	3–0	Jordan	Nonthaburi, Thailand
17:00 UTC+07:00	Orathai 11'; Silawan 51'; Feras 54' (o.g.)			Stadium: SCG Stadium

12 December 2017 Friendly match	Thailand	1–2	Jordan	Nonthaburi, Thailand
17:00 UTC+07:00	Ainon 27' (pen.)		Jbarah 41', 60'	Stadium: SCG Stadium

- ^{1} Non FIFA 'A' international match

=== 2018 ===
19 January 2018 Four Nations Tournament	Colombia	1–1	Thailand	Foshan, China
16:00 UTC+08	Caro 55'	Report report	Kanjana 51'	Stadium: Century Lotus Stadium

21 January 2018 Four Nations Tournament	China	2–1	Thailand	Foshan, China
16:00 UTC+08	Wang Shanshan 30'; Ren Guixin 49' (pen.)	Report report	Kanjana 21'	Stadium: Century Lotus Stadium; Referee: Yu Hong (China)

24 January 2018 Four Nations Tournament	Thailand	2–0	Vietnam	Foshan, China
16:00 UTC+08	Taneekarn 83'; Kanjana 90' (pen.)	Report report		Stadium: Century Lotus Stadium

26 March 2018 Friendly	Australia	5–0	Thailand	Perth, Australia
18:00 AWST	Chidiac 6'; De Vanna 42', 52'; Logarzo 44'; Crummer 75'	report report		Stadium: NIB Stadium

6 April 2018 2018 AFC Women's Asian Cup GS	China	4–0	Thailand	Amman, Jordan
16:45 (EEST)	Song Duan 56', 77'; Wang Shuang 63'; Li Ying 67'	report report		Stadium: Amman International Stadium; Attendance: 5,060; Referee: Kate Jacewicz (Australia)

9 April 2018 2018 AFC Women's Asian Cup GS	Thailand	6–1	Jordan	Amman, Jordan
20:00 (EEST)	Suchawadee 1', 69'; Taneekarn 6'; Silawan 39'; Kanjana 41'; Pitsamai 90'	report report	Jebreen 43'	Stadium: King Abdullah II Stadium; Attendance: 5,000; Referee: Yoshimi Yamashita (Japan)

12 April 2018 2018 AFC Women's Asian Cup GS	Thailand	3–1	Philippines	Amman, Jordan
20:00 (EEST)	Kanjana 28' (pen.), 53'; Silawan 62'	report report	Shugg 90+3'	Stadium: King Abdullah II Stadium; Referee: Oh Hyeon-jeong (South Korea)

17 April 2018 2018 AFC Women's Asian Cup Semi-finals	Australia	2–2 (a.e.t.) (3–1 p)	Thailand	Amman, Jordan
16:45 (EEST)	Kanjanaporn 17' (o.g.); Kennedy 90+1'	report report	Kanjana 20'; Rattikan 63'	Stadium: King Abdullah II Stadium, Amman; Attendance: 166; Referee: Edita Mirabidova (Uzbekistan)
	Penalties
	van Egmond (penalty missed); Kellond-Knight (penalty scored); De Vanna (penalty missed); Catley (penalty scored); Kerr (penalty scored)		(penalty scored) Ainon; (penalty missed) Sunisa; (penalty missed) Silawan; (penalty missed) Pitsamai

20 April 2018 2018 AFC Women's Asian Cup Third place match	China	3–1	Thailand	Amman, Jordan
16:45 (EEST)	Li Ying 51'; Wang Shanshan 56'; Song Duan 61'	report report	Rattikan 81'	Stadium: Amman International Stadium; Attendance: 1,026; Referee: Yoshimi Yamashita (Japan)

27 May 2018 Friendly	Indonesia	0–13	Thailand	Palembang, Indonesia
20:30 UTC+7		Report report	Taneekarn 4', 28', 40'; Khwanrudi 5', 10'; Silawan 27', 45'; Ainon 30'; Wilaiporn 34'; Saowalak 56', 73', 80'; Sudarat 87'	Stadium: Gelora Sriwijaya Stadium

30 May 2018 Friendly	Indonesia	0–3	Thailand	Palembang, Indonesia
20:30 UTC+7		Report	Alisa 45'; Silawan 83'; Kanyanat 87'	Stadium: Bumi Sriwijaya Stadium

8 June 2018 Friendly	Thailand	3–0	Malaysia	Chonburi, Thailand
17:00 UTC+7	Kanjana 45+1' (pen.); Silawan 75'; Saowalak 87'	Report		Stadium: IPE Chonburi Stadium

12 June 2018 Friendly	Thailand	1–1	Myanmar	Bangkok, Thailand
18:00 UTC+7	Kanjana 48'	Report	July Kyaw 80'	Stadium: Bangkokthonburi University Stadium

16 June 2018 Friendly	Thailand	2–1	Myanmar	Bangkok, Thailand
16:00 UTC+7	Rattikan 5'; Pitsamai 50'	Report	Nu Nu 90'	Stadium: Bangkokthonburi University Stadium

2 July 2018 AFF Women's Championship	Timor-Leste	0–8	Thailand	Palembang, Indonesia
16:00 UTC+7		report report	Concieco 7' (o.g.); Kanjana 16'; Rattikan 18', 51'; Pitsamai 49', 71', 80'; Alisa 57'	Stadium: Bumi Sriwijaya Stadium; Attendance: 100; Referee: Jhesa Mae Kaatz (Philippines)

4 July 2018 AFF Women's Championship	Thailand	11–0	Cambodia	Palembang, Indonesia
16:00 UTC+7	Nildhamrong 5', 9', 52', 73'; Intamee 12'; Sudarat 27' (pen.); Rattikan 33', 82'; Pitsamai 38'; Nipawan 59'; Alisa 75'	Report		Stadium: Bumi Sriwijaya Stadium; Attendance: 100; Referee: Abirami Apbai Naidu (Singapore)

6 July 2018 AFF Women's Championship	Malaysia	0–8	Thailand	Palembang, Indonesia
19:00 UTC+7		Report	Sudarat 4', 72'; Kanjana 16'; Srimanee 32', 47'; Suchawadee 36'; Pitsamai 75', 90+4'	Stadium: Bumi Sriwijaya Stadium; Attendance: 150; Referee: Bui Thi Thu Trang (Vietnam)

8 July 2018 AFF Women's Championship	Thailand	4–2	Australia U-20	Palembang, Indonesia
19:00 UTC+7	Silawan 50'; Kanjana 60', 62', 63'	Report	Chidiac 86' (pen.); Cooney-Cross 90+1'	Stadium: Bumi Sriwijaya Stadium; Attendance: 300; Referee: Bui Thi Thu Trang (Vietnam)

11 July 2018 AFF Women's Championship Semi-finals	Thailand	3–1	Myanmar	Palembang, Indonesia
16:00 UTC+7	Kanjana 35'; Pitsamai 52'; Rattikan 64'	Report	Khin Moe Wai 25'	Stadium: Bumi Sriwijaya Stadium; Attendance: 200; Referee: Công Thị Dung (Vietnam)

13 July 2018 AFF Women's Championship Final	Thailand	3–2	Australia U-20	Palembang, Indonesia
19:00 UTC+7	Suchawadee 59'; Orathai 70'; Rattikan 73'	Report	Fowler 26', 58'	Stadium: Jakabaring Stadium

16 August 2018 2018 Asian Games Group stage	Thailand	0–2	Japan	Palembang, Indonesia
18:30 UTC+7		Report	Iwabuchi 33'; Momiki 85'	Stadium: Bumi Sriwijaya Stadium; Referee: Mi Siyu (China)

19 August 2018 2018 Asian Games Group stage	Vietnam	3–2	Thailand	Palembang, Indonesia
18:30 UTC+7	Tuyết Dung 22'; Vạn 33'; Liễu 40'	Report	Suchawadee 30' (pen.); Pitsamai 79'	Stadium: Bumi Sriwijaya Stadium; Referee: Mahsa Ghorbani (Iran)

25 August 2018 2018 Asian Games Quarter-finals	China	5–0	Thailand	Palembang, Indonesia
19:30 UTC+7	Wang Shuang 32', 84', 90+1'; Xiao Yuyi 65'; Gu Yasha 85'	Report		Stadium: Gelora Sriwijaya Stadium; Referee: Anna Sidorova (Uzbekistan)

4 October 2018 Yongchuan International Tournament	Thailand	1–3	Finland	Yongchuan Sports Center, Chongqing
16:00 UTC+8	Rattikan 15'	Report	Summanen 2'; Öling 6', 64'	Referee: Yu Hong (China)

6 October 2018 Yongchuan International Tournament	Thailand	1–4	Portugal	Yongchuan Sports Center, Chongqing
16:00 UTC+8	Kanyanat 45+1'	Report	Leite 42'; C. Mendes 67', 86', 90+3'	Referee: Chang Xinxin (China)

8 October 2018 Yongchuan International Tournament	China	2–0	Thailand	Yongchuan Sports Center, Chongqing
19:35 UTC+8	Li Ying 4'; Ren Guixin 15'	Report		Referee: Yu Hong (China)

=== 2019 ===
27 February 2019 2019 Cyprus Women's Cup	Thailand	4–0	Hungary	Larnaca, Cyprus
18:00 UTC+02:00	Rattikan 11', 49'; Orathai 45+2'; Suchawadee 86'	Report		Stadium: Antonis Papadopoulos Stadium

1 March 2019 2019 Cyprus Women's Cup	Thailand	1–2	Mexico	Larnaca, Cyprus
13:00 UTC+02:00	Taneekarn 48'	Report	Corral 3' (pen.), 84'	Stadium: GSZ Stadium

4 March 2019 2019 Cyprus Women's Cup	Italy	4–1	Thailand	Larnaca, Cyprus
13:00 UTC+02:00	Bonansea 19'; Sabatino 54'; Galli 57'; Natthakarn 89' (o.g.)	Report	Taneekarn 67'	Stadium: AEK Arena

6 March 2019 2019 Cyprus Women's Cup	Nigeria	3–0	Thailand	Paralimni, Cyprus
15:00 UTC+02:00	Oshoala 23'; Ebi 28'; Imo 74'	Report		Stadium: Paralimni Stadium

25 May 2019 Friendly	France	3–0	Thailand	Orléans, France
16:00 UTC+2	Bussaglia 60'; Diani 78', 86'	Report		Stadium: Stade de la Source; Attendance: 7,000; Referee: Lina Lehtovaara (Finland)

1 June 2019 Friendly	Belgium	6–1	Thailand	Leuven, Belgium
15:30 UTC+2	Van Kerkhoven 2', 50', 52'; Wullaert 18'; Cayman 74'; Daniëls 87'	Report	Kanjana 90+2'	Stadium: Den Dreef

11 June 2019 FIFA Women's World Cup – GS	United States	13–0	Thailand	Reims, France
21:00 UTC+2	Morgan 12', 53', 74', 81', 87'; Lavelle 20', 56'; Horan 32'; Mewis 50', 54'; Rapinoe 79'; Pugh 84'; Lloyd 90+2'	report report		Stadium: Stade Auguste-Delaune; Attendance: 18,591; Referee: Laura Fortunato (Argentina)

16 June 2019 FIFA Women's World Cup – GS	Sweden	5–1	Thailand	Nice, France
15:00 UTC+2	Sembrant 6'; Asllani 19'; Rolfö 42'; Hurtig 81'; Rubensson 90+6' (pen.)	report report	Kanjana 90+1'	Stadium: Allianz Riviera; Attendance: 9,354; Referee: Salima Mukansanga (Rwanda)

20 June 2019 FIFA Women's World Cup – GS	Thailand	0–2	Chile	Rennes, France
21:00 UTC+2		report report	Waraporn 48' (o.g.); Urrutia 80'	Stadium: Roazhon Park; Attendance: 13,567; Referee: Anna-Marie Keighley (New Zealand)

17 August 2019 2019 AFF Women's Championship	Singapore	0–8	Thailand	Chonburi, Thailand
18:00 UTC+7		Report	Wilaiporn 3', 68', 90+3'; Rattikan 30'; Orapin 45'; Saowalak 72'; Irravadee 75'; Nutwadee 83'	Stadium: IPE Chonburi Stadium 1 Chonburi; Attendance: 100; Referee: Công Thị Dung (Vietnam)

19 August 2019 2019 AFF Women's Championship	Thailand	9–0	Timor-Leste	Chonburi, Thailand
18:00 UTC+7	Jaruwan 1'; Mendonça 11' (o.g.); Orapin 45', 90'; Kanjana 50', 60'; Suchawadee 63', 90+2'; Pitsamai 64'	Report		Stadium: IPE Chonburi Stadium 1 Chonburi; Attendance: 70; Referee: Công Thị Dung (Vietnam)

21 August 2019 2019 AFF Women's Championship	Philippines	2–4	Thailand	Chonburi, Thailand
18:00 UTC+7	Quezada 11', 66'	Report	Jaruwan 16'; Rattikan 74'; Silawan 75'; Wilaiporn 90'	Stadium: IPE Chonburi Stadium 1 Chonburi; Attendance: 100; Referee: Oh Hyeon-jeong (South Korea)

23 August 2019 2019 AFF Women's Championship	Thailand	7–0	Malaysia	Chonburi, Thailand
18:00 UTC+7	Saowalak 2', 14', 35', 86'; Orapin 26'; Khwanrudi 43', 47'	Report		Stadium: IPE Chonburi Stadium 1 Chonburi; Attendance: 50; Referee: Abirami Abpai Naidu (Singapore)

25 August 2019 2019 AFF Women's Championship Semi-finals	Thailand	3–1	Myanmar	Chonburi, Thailand
18:00 UTC+7	Pitsamai 20'; Rattikan 81'; Silawan 88'	Report	Khin Marlar Tun 90+3'	Stadium: IPE Chonburi Stadium 1 Chonburi; Attendance: 200; Referee: Rebecca Durcau (Australia)

27 August 2019 2019 AFF Women's Championship Final	Thailand	0–1 (a.e.t.)	Vietnam	Chonburi, Thailand
18:00 UTC+7		Report	Huỳnh Như 93'	Stadium: IPE Chonburi Stadium 1 Chonburi; Attendance: 300; Referee: Abirami Abpai Naidu (Singapore)

15 November 2019 Friendly	Chinese Taipei	1–1	Thailand	Taipei, Taiwan
19:00 UTC+8	Chen Yen-ping 52'	report video	Rattikan 45+1'	Stadium: Taipei Municipal Stadium

26 November 2019 2019 Southeast Asian Games	Vietnam	1–1	Thailand	Biñan, Philippines
16:00 UTC+8	Dương Thị Vân 45+1'	report report	Taneekarn 87'	Stadium: Biñan Football Stadium; Referee: Choki Om (Bhutan)

2 December 2019 2019 Southeast Asian Games	Thailand	5–1	Indonesia	Manila, Philippines
16:00 UTC+8	Kanyanat 2', 18', 29'; Silawan 42'; Suchawadee 51'	report report	Rani 70'	Stadium: Rizal Memorial Stadium

5 December 2019 2019 Southeast Asian Games Semi-finals	Myanmar	0–1	Thailand	Manila, Philippines
20:00 UTC+8		report report	Orapin 78'	Stadium: Rizal Memorial Stadium

8 December 2019 2019 Southeast Asian Games Gold medal match	Thailand	0–1 (a.e.t.)	Vietnam	Manila, Philippines
20:00 UTC+8		report report	Phạm Hải Yến 92'	Stadium: Rizal Memorial Stadium; Referee: Asaka Koizumi (Japan)

=== 2020 ===
25 January 2020 Friendly	Myanmar	1–2	Thailand	Mandalay, Myanmar
16.00 +6.30	July Kyaw 84'	report	Orapin 16'; Ploychompoo 20'	Stadium: Mandalar Thiri Stadium

28 January 2020 Friendly	Myanmar	1–1	Thailand	Mandalay, Myanmar
16.00 +6.30	Khin Moe Wai 18'	report	Saowalak 50'	Stadium: Mandalar Thiri Stadium

3 February 2020 2020 AFC Women's Olympic Qualifying - Third round	Thailand	0–1	Chinese Taipei	Campbelltown Stadium, Sydney
16:30 UTC+11		Report	Ting Chi 19'	Referee: Yoshimi Yamashita (Japan)

7 February 2020 2020 AFC Women's Olympic Qualifying - Third round	China	6–1	Thailand	Campbelltown Stadium, Sydney
16:30 UTC+11	Li Ying 6', 66'; Zhang Xin 11'; Wang Shanshan 41'; Tang Jiali 45', 51'	Live Report; Stats Report	Silawan 80'	Referee: Abirami Naidu (Singapore)

10 February 2020 2020 AFC Women's Olympic Qualifying - Third round	Thailand	0–6	Australia	Campbelltown Stadium, Sydney
16:30 UTC+11		Report	Van Egmond 44', 45+4', 70'; Simon 67', 73'; Raso 71'	Referee: Mahsa Ghorbani (Iran)

=== 2021 ===
19 September 2021 2022 AFC Women's Asian Cup qualification Group H	Malaysia	0–4	Thailand	Al-Ram, Palestine
15:30 UTC+3		Report	Kanyanat 1', 37', 90+2'; Nutwadee 2'	Stadium: Faisal Al-Husseini International Stadium; Referee: Cha Minji (South Korea)

25 September 2021 2022 AFC Women's Asian Cup qualification Group H	Thailand	7–0	Palestine	Al-Ram, Palestine
15:30 UTC+3	Janista 45+2', 90+6'; Silawan 45+2', 76'; Irrvadee 47', 62', 82'	Report		Stadium: Faisal Al-Husseini International Stadium; Referee: Jhesa Mae Palma Kaatz (Philippine)

=== 2022 ===
21 January 2022 2022 AFC Women's Asian Cup	Thailand	0–1	Philippines	Navi Mumbai, India
17:30 UTC+5:30		Report	McDaniel 81'	Stadium: DY Patil Stadium; Referee: Công Thị Dung (Vietnam)

24 January 2022 2022 AFC Women's Asian Cup	Indonesia	0–4	Thailand	Navi Mumbai, India
17:30 UTC+5:30		Report	Chetthabutr 27', 36', 71'; Makris 76'	Stadium: DY Patil Stadium; Referee: Yoshimi Yamashita (Japan)

27 January 2022 2022 AFC Women's Asian Cup	Australia	2–1	Thailand	Mumbai, India
19:30 UTC+5:30	van Egmond 39'; Kerr 80'	Report	Nipawan 90+3'	Stadium: Mumbai Football Arena; Referee: Thein Thein Aye (Myanmar)

30 January 2022 2022 AFC Women's Asian Cup QF	Japan	7–0	Thailand	Navi Mumbai, India
13:30 UTC+5:30	Sugasawa 27', 65' (pen.), 80', 83'; Miyazawa 45+2'; Sumida 48'; Ueki 76'	Report		Stadium: DY Patil Stadium; Referee: Casey Reibelt (Australia)

2 February 2022 2022 AFC Women's Asian Cup Repechage	Thailand	0–2	Vietnam	Navi Mumbai, India
13:30 UTC+5:30		Report	Huỳnh Như 19'; Thái Thị Thảo 24'	Stadium: DY Patil Stadium; Referee: Edita Mirabidova (Uzbekistan)

4 February 2022 2022 AFC Women's Asian Cup Repechage	Chinese Taipei	3–0	Thailand	Navi Mumbai, India
13:30 UTC+5:30	Su Yu-hsuan 44', 84'; Chen Ying-hui 90+3'	Report		Stadium: DY Patil Stadium; Referee: Kim Yu-jeong (South Korea)

10 May 2022 2021 Southeast Asian Games	Thailand	3–0	Singapore	Quảng Ninh, Vietnam
19:00 UTC+7	Kanyanat 7'; Nutwadee 17'; Chatchawan 21'	Report		Stadium: Cẩm Phả Stadium; Attendance: 5,000; Referee: Lê Thị Ly (Vietnam)

13 May 2022 2021 Southeast Asian Games	Thailand	1–1	Myanmar	Quảng Ninh, Vietnam
19:00 UTC+7	Irravadee 13'	Report	Win Theingi Tun 79'	Stadium: Cẩm Phả Stadium; Referee: Saltanat Noroozi (Iran)

15 May 2022 2021 Southeast Asian Games	Laos	0–5	Thailand	Quảng Ninh, Vietnam
19:00 UTC+7		Report	Chatchawan 17'; Taneekarn 44', 60', 85'; Ploychompoo 57'	Stadium: Cẩm Phả Stadium; Referee: Doumouh Al Bakkar (Lebanon)

18 May 2022 2021 Southeast Asian Games SF	Thailand	3–0	Philippines	Quảng Ninh, Vietnam
15:30 UTC+7	Silawan 22'; Taneekarn 47'; Ploychompoo 90+1'	Report		Stadium: Cẩm Phả Stadium; Attendance: 3,565; Referee: Rebecca Durcau (Australia)

21 May 2022 2021 Southeast Asian Games Gold medal match	Vietnam	1–0	Thailand	Quảng Ninh, Vietnam
19:00 UTC+7	Huỳnh Như 59'	Report		Stadium: Cẩm Phả Stadium; Attendance: 16,020; Referee: Choki Om (Bhutan)

4 July 2022 2022 AFF Women's Championship GS	Indonesia	0–4	Thailand	Biñan, Philippines
19:00 UTC+8		Report	Alisa 3', 88'; Tipkritta 10'; Fasawang 69'	Stadium: Biñan Football Stadium; Referee: Công Thị Dung (Vietnam)

6 July 2022 2022 AFF Women's Championship GS^{1}	Thailand	2–2	Australia U23	Manila, Philippines
16:00 UTC+8	Kanyanat 41'; Ploychompoo 60'	Report	Sayer 18'; Hawkesby 26' (pen.)	Stadium: Rizal Memorial Stadium; Referee: Bùi Thị Thu Trang (Vietnam)

8 July 2022 2022 AFF Women's Championship GS	Thailand	3–0	Singapore	Biñan, Philippines
19:00 UTC+8	Saengrawee 22'; Tipkritta 49'; Jiraporn 72'	Report		Stadium: Biñan Football Stadium; Referee: Công Thị Dung (Vietnam)

10 July 2022 2022 AFF Women's Championship GS	Malaysia	0–4	Thailand	Biñan, Philippines
19:00 UTC+8		Report	Ploychompoo 25'; Pattaranan 55'; U-raiporn 74'; Nutwadee 86'	Stadium: Biñan Football Stadium; Attendance: 32; Referee: Plong Pichakara (Cambodia)

12 July 2022 2022 AFF Women's Championship GS	Thailand	1–0	Philippines	Manila, Philippines
19:00 UTC+8	Kanyanat 76'	Report		Stadium: Rizal Memorial Stadium; Attendance: 2,923; Referee: Thein Thein Aye (Myanmar)

15 July 2022 2022 AFF Women's Championship SF	Thailand	2–0	Myanmar	Manila, Philippines
16:00 UTC+8	Kanyanat 45'; Saowalak 82'	Report		Stadium: Rizal Memorial Stadium; Attendance: 277; Referee: Jhesa Mae Kaatz (Philippine)

17 July 2022 2022 AFF Women's Championship Final	Thailand	0–3	Philippines	Manila, Philippines
19:30 UTC+8		Report	Cowart 8'; Guillou 21'; Bolden 89'	Stadium: Rizal Memorial Stadium; Attendance: 8,257; Referee: Bùi Thị Thu Trang (Vietnam)

15 November 2022 Friendly	Australia	2–0	Thailand	Gosford, Australia
15:30 UTC+10	Kerr 40'; Raso 47'	Report		Stadium: Central Coast Stadium; Attendance: 11,271; Referee: Anna-Marie Keighley (New Zealand)

- ^{1} Non FIFA 'A' international match

=== 2023 ===
18 January 2023 Friendly	Thailand	2–0	Chinese Taipei	Pathum Thani, Thailand
16:00 UTC+7	Saowalak 29', 65'	Report		Stadium: BG Stadium

18 February 2023 2023 inter-confederation play-offs	Cameroon	2–0	Thailand	Hamilton, New Zealand
19:00 UTC+13	Onguéné 79', 81'	Report		Stadium: Waikato Stadium; Attendance: 1,021; Referee: Melissa Borjas (Honduras)

21 February 2023 Friendly	Thailand	1–1	Senegal	Hamilton, New Zealand
19:00	Janista 17'	report	Diakhaté 67' (pen.)	Stadium: Waikato Stadium; Referee: Emikar Calderas (Venezuela)

1 April 2023 2024 AFC Olympic Qualifiers Round 1	Singapore	0–6	Thailand	Chonburi, Thailand
17:00 UTC+7		Report	Orapin 7'; Pluemjai 21', 65'; Saowalak 57', 77'; Panittha 86'	Stadium: Chonburi Stadium; Attendance: 500; Referee: Thein Thein Aye (Myanmar)

7 April 2023 2024 AFC Olympic Qualifiers Round 1	Thailand	6–0	Mongolia	Chonburi, Thailand
17:00 UTC+7	Nutwadee 11'; Pattaranan 16'; Ploychompoo 27'; Orawan 50'; Jiraporn 68' (pen.), 90+1'	Report		Stadium: Chonburi Stadium; Referee: Yu Hong (China)

3 May 2023 2023 Southeast Asian Games	Thailand	4–0	Singapore	Phnom Penh, Cambodia
16:00 UTC+7	Saowalak 5'; Orapin 19'; Nipawan 28'; Jiraporn 68'	Report		Stadium: RCAF Old Stadium

6 May 2023 2023 Southeast Asian Games	Laos	0–6	Thailand	Phnom Penh, Cambodia
16:00 UTC+7		Report	Jiraporn 9', 40', 90+6'; Saowalak 19'; Thanchanok 54'; Orapin 65'	Stadium: RSN Stadium

9 May 2023 2023 Southeast Asian Games	Cambodia	0–3	Thailand	Phnom Penh, Cambodia
20:00 UTC+7		Report	Panittha 23'; Nualanong 45+2'; Jiraporn 90+3'	Stadium: RSN Stadium

12 May 2023 2023 Southeast Asian Games SF	Thailand	2–4	Myanmar	Phnom Penh, Cambodia
16:00 UTC+7	Saowalak 10'; Orapin 18'	Report	Yu Per Khine 43'; Win Theingi Tun 48'; Phyu Phyu Win 52'; Myat Noe Khin 90+2'	Stadium: RCAF Old Stadium

15 May 2023 2023 Southeast Asian Games Bronze medal match	Cambodia	0–6	Thailand	Phnom Penh, Cambodia
16:00 UTC+7		Report	Saowalak 16', 33'; Jiraporn 25'; Panittha 52'; Pattaranan 54', 88'	Stadium: Olympic Stadium; Referee: Tian Jin (China)

13 August 2023 Friendly	Hong Kong	0–5	Thailand	Tsing Yi, Hong Kong
16:30 UTC+8		Report	Chatchawan 1'; Saowalak 30' (pen.), 45'; Kanyanat 33'; Natcha 90+3'	Stadium: Tsing Yi Sports Ground; Referee: (South Korea)

24 September 2023 2022 Asian Games GS	India	0–1	Thailand	Wenzhou, China
19:30 UTC+8		report Report	Parichat 51'	Stadium: Wenzhou Olympic Sports Centre Stadium; Attendance: 16,047; Referee: Le Thi Ly (Vietnam)

27 September 2023 2022 Asian Games GS	Thailand	0–1	Chinese Taipei	Wenzhou, China
19:30 UTC+8		Report	Phornphirun 36' (o.g.)	Stadium: Wenzhou Olympic Sports Centre Stadium; Referee: Kim Yu-jeong (South Korea)

30 September 2023 2022 Asian Games QF	China	4–0	Thailand	Hangzhou, China
20:00 UTC+8	Wang Shanshan 3'; Wang Shuang 41', 51'; Yang Lina 81'	report Report		Stadium: Linping Sports Center Stadium; Referee: Bernatskaia Veronika (Kyrgyzstan)

26 October 2023 2024 Olympic Games Qualifying Second Round	South Korea	10–1	Thailand	Xiamen, China
15:30 UTC+8	Phair 33', 56', 66'; Chun Ga-ram 36', 49', 75'; Kang Chae-rim 39', 54'; Lee Geum-min 68'; Moon Mi-ra 72'	Report	Rinyaphat 90+3'	Stadium: Xiamen Egret Stadium; Attendance: 2,269; Referee: Lê Thị Lý (Vietnam)

29 October 2023 2024 Olympic Games Qualifying Second Round	Thailand	0–3	China	Xiamen, China
19:35 UTC+8		Report	Yan Jinjin 15'; Chen Qiaozhu 68'; Wurigumula 80'	Stadium: Xiamen Egret Stadium; Attendance: 20,706; Referee: Yoshimi Yamashita (Japan)

1 November 2023 2024 Olympic Games Qualifying Second Round	Thailand	0–7	North Korea	Xiamen, China
15:30 UTC+8		Report	Kim Kyong-yong 22', 27', 59'; Sung Hyang-sim 24'; Kim Jong-sim 80'; Ri Hak 86'; Ju Hyo-sim 89'	Stadium: Xiamen Egret Stadium; Attendance: 869; Referee: Plong Pich Akara (Cambodia)

=== 2024 ===
6 April 2024 Friendly	New Zealand	4–0	Thailand	Christchurch, New Zealand
15:00 UTC+13	Wilkinson 17'; Hand 64'; Kitching 71', 87' (pen.)	Source; Source		Stadium: Rugby League Park; Attendance: 6,031

9 April 2024 Friendly	New Zealand	0–0	Thailand	Christchurch, New Zealand
19:00 UTC+13		Source; Source report		Stadium: Rugby League Park; Attendance: 15,500; Referee: Rebecca Durcau (Australia)

4 August 2024 Friendly	Thailand	2–1	Chinese Taipei	Bangkok, Thailand
18:00 UTC+7	Kanchanathat 85' (pen.); Parichat 90+2'	Source; Source	Lee Yi-wei 71'	Stadium: PAT Stadium; Referee: Le Thị Phoung (Vietnam)

23 October 2024 Friendly	Thailand	0–2	Venezuela	Mexico City, Mexico
18:00 UTC-4		Source	Viso 7'; Altuve 75' (pen.)	Stadium: Centro de Alto Rendimiento

29 October 2024 Friendly	Mexico	4–0	Thailand	Toluca, Mexico
19:00 UTC-6	Burkenroad 15'; Soto 47', 90+2'; Reyes 88'	Source report		Stadium: Estadio Nemesio Díez; Referee: Merlin Vanessa Soto Rodríguez (Honduras)

=== 2025 ===
20 February 2025 2025 Pink Ladies Cup	Russia	3–1	Thailand	Al Hamriyah, UAE
19:00 UTC+4	Morozova 15'; Ishmukhametova 48'; Smirnova 67'	report source	Jiraporn M. 35'	Stadium: Al Hamriya Sports Club Stadium; Referee: Mohamed Abdullah Alharmoudi (United Arab Emirates)

23 February 2025 2025 Pink Ladies Cup	Thailand	0–4	South Korea	Al Hamriyah, UAE
15:00 UTC+4		report source	Lee Geum-min 24'; Choe Yu-ri 32'; Ji So-yun 45+2'; Moon Eun-ju 77'	Stadium: Al Hamriya Sports Club Stadium; Referee: Yahya Almulla (United Arab Emirates)

26 February 2025 2025 Pink Ladies Cup	Uzbekistan	0–0	Thailand	Al Hamriyah, UAE
15:00 UTC+4		source		Stadium: Al Hamriya Sports Club Stadium

5 April 2025 Yongchuan International Tournament	Zambia	2–3	Thailand	Chongqing, China
19:35 UTC+8	Nachula 45'; Lubandji 60'	report source	Thawanrat 36'; Kanchanathat 69'; Saowalak 73' (pen.)	Stadium: Yongchuan Sports Center; Referee: Mu Mingxin (China)

8 April 2025 Yongchuan International Tournament	China	5–1	Thailand	Chongqing, China
19:35 UTC+8	Shao Ziqin 2', 11', 83'; Zhang Xin 47'; Wang Aifang 84'	report source	Kanchanathat 48'	Stadium: Yongchuan Sports Center; Attendance: 21,690; Referee: Lê Thị Lý (Vietnam)

30 May 2025 Friendly^{1}	Thailand	1–0	Nepal	Thailand
18:00 UTC+7		source

2 June 2025 Friendly	Thailand	2–0	Nepal	Pathum Thani, Thailand
18:30 UTC+7	Chatchawan 59'; Jiraporn 73'	source		Stadium: Thammasat Stadium; Referee: Le Thi Ly (Vietnam)

26 June 2025 2026 AFC Women's Asian Cup qualification	Timor-Leste	0–4	Thailand	Chiang Mai, Thailand
19:30 UTC+7		report source	Saowalak 6', 31', 45'; Ploychompoo 90+2'	Stadium: 700th Anniversary Stadium; Referee: Azusa Sugino (Japan)

29 June 2025 2026 AFC Women's Asian Cup qualification	Thailand	7–0	Iraq	Chiang Mai, Thailand
19:30 UTC+7	Wiranya 13', 77', 82'; Pichayatida 36'; Panittha 45+3'; Karnjanathat 58', 65' (pen.)	report source		Stadium: 700th Anniversary Stadium; Referee: Kim Yu-jeong (South Korea)

2 July 2025 2026 AFC Women's Asian Cup qualification	Mongolia	0–11	Thailand	Chiang Mai, Thailand
19:30 UTC+7		report source	Thawanrat 3', 90+2'; Saowalak 5'; Thanchanok 12', 45+2'; Pattaranan 29', 52', 79'; Karnjanathat 49' (pen.), 66', 90+3'	Stadium: 700th Anniversary Stadium; Referee: Nurul Ain Izatty (Malaysia)

5 July 2025 2026 AFC Women's Asian Cup qualification	Thailand	1–2	India	Chiang Mai, Thailand
19:30 UTC+7	Chatchawan 47'	report	Basfore 29', 74'	Stadium: 700th Anniversary Stadium; Referee: Kim Yu-jeong (South Korea)

6 August 2025 ASEAN Championship GS	Thailand	7–0	Indonesia	Haiphong, Vietnam
16:30 UTC+7	Karnjanathat 6', 27' (pen.); Madison 19'; Pichayatida 40'; Janista 41'; Pinyaphat 71'; Thawanrat 72'	Report		Stadium: Lạch Tray Stadium; Referee: Razlan Joffri Ali (Malaysia)

9 August 2025 ASEAN Championship GS	Cambodia	0–7	Thailand	Haiphong, Vietnam
16:30 UTC+7		Report	Madison 38', 45+2'; Janista 40', 47', 90'; Thawanrat 70'; Ploychompoo 81'	Stadium: Lạch Tray Stadium; Referee: Rustam Lutfullin (Uzbekistan)

12 August 2025 ASEAN Championship GS	Vietnam	1–0	Thailand	Haiphong, Vietnam
19:30 UTC+7	Tran Thi Thu Thao 36'	Report		Stadium: Lạch Tray Stadium; Referee: Rustam Lutfullin (Uzbekistan)

16 August 2025 ASEAN Championship SF	Myanmar	2–1	Thailand	Haiphong, Vietnam
16:00 UTC+7	Win Theingi Tun 13', 72' (pen.)	Report	Wiranya 6'	Stadium: Lạch Tray Stadium; Referee: Kim Yu-jeong (South Korea)

19 August 2025 ASEAN Championship 3rd Place	Thailand	1–3	Vietnam	Haiphong, Vietnam
16:30 UTC+7	Wiranya 87'	Report	Phạm Hải Yến 45'; Huỳnh Như 65'; Nguyễn Thị Bích Thùy 68'	Stadium: Lạch Tray Stadium; Referee: Kim Yu-jeong (South Korea)

24 October 2025 Friendly	Thailand	3–0	Bangladesh	Bangkok, Thailand
17:00 UTC+7	Orapin 1'; Saowalak 51'; Pattaranan 86'	Report (Bengali); Report (Thai)		Stadium: High Performance Training Center; Referee: Bui Thi Thu Trang (Vietnam)

27 October 2025 Friendly	Thailand	5–1	Bangladesh	Bangkok, Thailand
18:00 UTC+7	Saowalak 12'; Jiraporn 23', 58' (pen.); Madison 34', 54'	Report	Shamsunnahar 29'	Stadium: Chalerm Phrakiat Bang Mod Stadium; Referee: Bui Thi Thu Trang (Vietnam)

4 December 2025 2025 SEA Games	Thailand	8–0	Indonesia	Chonburi, Thailand
18:30 UTC+7	Yumanda 8' (o.g.); Pattaranan 21'; Silawan 27'; Saowalak 44'; Jiraporn 50' (pen.), 52' (pen.), 59'; Panittha 55'	Report		Stadium: Chonburi Stadium; Referee: Azusa Sugino (Japan)

10 December 2025 2025 SEA Games	Thailand	2–0	Singapore	Chonburi, Thailand
18:30 UTC+7	Kanyanat 9'; Orapin 18'	Report		Stadium: Chonburi Stadium; Referee: Rebecca Durcau (Australia)

14 December 2025 2025 SEA Games SF	Thailand	1–1 (a.e.t.) (2–4 p)	Philippines	Chonburi, Thailand
18:30 UTC+7	Jiraporn 53'	Report	Guy 87' (pen.)	Stadium: Chonburi Stadium; Referee: Esra'a Almbaidin (Jordan)
	Penalties
	Jiraporn (penalty scored); Taneekarn (penalty scored); Pluemjai (penalty missed); Orapin (penalty missed)		(penalty scored) Guy; (penalty scored) Carpio; (penalty scored) Eggesvik; (penalty scored) Long

17 December 2025 2025 SEA Games Bronze medal match	Thailand	2–0	Indonesia	Chonburi, Thailand
15:30 UTC+7	Pitsamai 17'; Pattaranan 43'	Report		Stadium: Chonburi Stadium; Referee: Gulshoda Saitkulova (Uzbekistan)

- ^{1} Non FIFA 'A' international match

=== 2026 ===
12 April 2026 2026 FIFA Series	Thailand	4–0	New Caledonia	Ratchaburi, Thailand
20:30 UTC+7	Natalie 4'; Thawanrat 28'; Janista 73'; Alisa 90+1'	Report (FIFA)		Stadium: Ratchaburi Stadium; Referee: Kim Yu-jeong (South Korea)

15 April 2026 2026 FIFA Series	Thailand	2–0	DR Congo	Ratchaburi, Thailand
20:30 UTC+7	Mårtensson 60'; Wiranya 90+4'	Report (FIFA)		Stadium: Ratchaburi Stadium; Referee: Kim Yu-jeong (South Korea)

6 June 2026 AYA Bank Tri-Nations Cup	Uzbekistan	0–1	Thailand	Yangon, Myanmar
17:00 UTC+6:30		Report	Jiraporn 2'	Stadium: Thuwunna Stadium; Referee: Khin Nyein Chan (Myanmar)

9 June 2026 AYA Bank Tri-Nations Cup	Myanmar	1–1	Thailand	Yangon, Myanmar
17:00 UTC+6:30	May Htet Lu 50'	Report	Thawanrat 55'	Stadium: Thuwunna Stadium; Referee: Plong Pichakara (Cambodia)

14 September 2026 2026 Asian Games GS	Japan	8–0	Thailand	Fukuroi, Japan
	Nakashima 3', 37', 41'; Kamiya 30'; Takarada 70', 74', 79'; Sakakibara 88'	Report		Stadium: Shizuoka Stadium; Attendance: 1,202; Referee: Nurul Ain Izatty Zainal (Malaysia)

17 September 2026 2026 Asian Games GS	Thailand	0–1	Chinese Taipei	Fukuroi, Japan
16:00 UTC+9		Report	Tanaka 78'	Stadium: Shizuoka Stadium; Attendance: 277; Referee: Rawdha Al-Mansoori (United Arab Emirates)

21 September 2026 2026 Asian Games GS	Vietnam	0–0	Thailand	Osaka, Japan
19:30 UTC+9		Report		Stadium: Nagai Stadium; Referee: Veronika Bernatskaia (Kyrgyzstan)

20 November 2026 Friendly^{1}	Thailand	4–2	(United Kingdom) Great Britain Police	Bangkok, Thailand
18:30 UTC+7	Kanyanat 30', 45+1'; Alisa 68'; Kanjanathat 88' (pen.)	Report	Atkin 13'; Snelling 15'	Stadium: PAT Stadium; Referee: Pansa Chaisanit (Thailand)

28 November 2026 Yongchuan International Tournament	China	–	Thailand	Chongqing, China
19:35 UTC+8				Stadium: Yongchuan Sports Center

1 December 2026 Yongchuan International Tournament	Thailand	–	Malawi	Chongqing, China
15:00 UTC+8				Stadium: Yongchuan Sports Center

4 December 2026 Yongchuan International Tournament	Albania	–	Thailand	Chongqing, China
15:00 UTC+8				Stadium: Yongchuan Sports Center

- ^{1} Non FIFA 'A' international match
