= 2020–21 Thai Women's League play-offs round =

Thai Women's League Play-Offs round
- Season: 2020/21

The Thai women's league Play-Offs round held on 19,20,30 September 2020 and 1,3,4 October 2020.

== Teams ==
- Chonburi FA
- Tiger Kids Mukdahan United
- Lopburi City
- Nonkhamdechudom United
- MH Nakhonsi
- Thawi Wattana Samutsakhon United
- SW Samutsakhon
- Lampang Sports School
- Khonkaen City
- BRU Burirat Academy
- Kasembundit
- Prime Bangkok
- Hinkon United
- Bangkok Sports School
- Rajpracha
- B.S.L. WFC (International teams that have been invited to the competition)

== Rules ==
Compete in matches within championship teams to qualify for 2020/21 Thai Women's League 1, while the 2nd and 3rd ranked teams in each group. Will be eligible to compete at 2020/21 Thai Women's League 2, while the final ranked teams in each group will not be eligible for the 2020/21 season. The rules for the ranking of the Thai Women's Football League play-offs rounds are: 1. Points, 2. Head-to-Head and 3. Goal difference

== Groups ==
=== Group A ===
Team	Pld	W	D	L	GF	GA	GD	Pts	Qualification
Lampang Sports School	3	2	0	1	19	3	+16	6 (Note: Head-to-head: Lampang Sports School (3 Pts 1 GD), Lopburi City (3 Pts 0 GD), Hinkon United (3 Pts -1 GD))	2020/21 Thai Women's League 1
Lopburi City	3	2	0	1	16	3	+13	6	2020/21 Thai Women's League 2
Hinkon United	3	2	0	1	21	5	+16	6	2020/21 Thai Women's League 2
Tiger Kids Mukdahan United	3	0	0	3	0	44	−44	0	not be eligible for the 2020/21 season

Updated to match(es) played on 3 October 2020. Source: Thai Women's League

==== Round 1 ====
19 September 2020	Lampang Sports School	4–2	Hinkon United	Bangkok
16:00	Chitchanok ?'; Pattaranan ?'; A-ranya ?'; Nawathan ?'	Report Starting List	Krittiya ?', ?'	Stadium: High Performance Training Centre; Referee: Sunita Thongthawin

19 September 2020	Tiger Kids Mukdahan United	0–13	Lopburi City	Bangkok
16:00		Report Starting List	Thanyarat ?', ?', ?', ?', ?'; Chuthamat ?', ?', ?'; Jantima ?', ?'; Supaporn ?'; Nuttanun ?'; Sasiwimon ?'	Stadium: High Performance Training Centre; Referee: Ananthip Poopan

==== Round 2 ====
30 September 2020	Hinkon United	17–0	Tiger Kids Mukdahan United	Bangkok
19:00	Krittiya ?', ?', ?', ?', ?', ?'; Rujira ?', ?', ?', ?', ?'; Chotika ?', ?'; Watcharaporn ?'; Supakan ?'; Pitchapa ?'; ? ?'	Report Starting List		Stadium: High Performance Training Centre; Referee: Ariya Kritsawong

30 September 2020	Lopburi City	2–1	Lampang Sports School	Bangkok
19:00	Nuttanun ?'; Chuthamat ?'	Report Starting List	Sutita ?'	Stadium: High Performance Training Centre; Referee: Anantasap Hatthasan

==== Round 3 ====
3 October 2020	Lampang Sports School	14–0	Tiger Kids Mukdahan United	Bangkok
16:00	Suchanan 6', 15'; Nareerat 12', ?'; Pattaranan 23', ?', ?', ?'; A-ranya ?', ?'; Supakan ?'	Report Starting List		Stadium: High Performance Training Centre; Referee: Supawadee Riangsa

3 October 2020	Hinkon United	2–1	Lopburi City	Bangkok
16:00	Supakan 17'; Krittiya ?'	Report Starting List	Supaporn ?'	Stadium: High Performance Training Centre; Referee: Supairee Tettomya

=== Group B ===
Team	Pld	W	D	L	GF	GA	GD	Pts	Qualification
MH Nakhonsi	3	3	0	0	23	3	+20	9	2020/21 Thai Women's League 1
Prime Bangkok	3	1	1	1	11	5	+6	4	2020/21 Thai Women's League 2
Rajpracha	3	0	2	1	7	19	−12	2	2020/21 Thai Women's League 2
Nonkhamdechudom United	3	0	1	2	5	19	−14	1	not be eligible for the 2020/21 season

Updated to match(es) played on 3 October 2020. Source: Thai Women's League

==== Round 1 ====
19 September 2020	MH Nakhonsi	3–1	Prime Bangkok	Bangkok
19:00	Kwannapha ?'; Arisa ?'; Nualanong ?'	Report Starting List	Sapphattra ?'	Stadium: High Performance Training Centre; Referee: Pansa Chaisanit

19 September 2020	Nonkhamdechudom United	4–4	Rajpracha	Bangkok
19:00	Amonrat ?', ?'; Onsuda ?'; Koonlasatree ?'	Report Starting List	Thanaporn ?', ?'; Paakjira ?'; Pimchanok ?'	Stadium: High Performance Training Centre; Referee: Ariya Kritsawong

==== Round 2 ====
30 September 2020	Prime Bangkok	9–1	Nonkhamdechudom United	Bangkok
16:00	Anootsara ?', ?', ?', ?'; Sunisa ?', ?'; Emma ?', ?'; Sapphattra ?'	Report Starting List	Amonrat ?'	Stadium: High Performance Training Centre; Referee: Sunita Thongthawin

30 September 2020	Rajpracha	2–14	MH Nakhonsi	Bangkok
16:00	Patasanan ?', ?'	Report Starting List	Fasawang ?', ?', ?', ?'; Irravadee ?', ?', ?'; Sirinthip ?', ?'; Chadanuch ?', ?'; Nuanlanong ?', ?'; Arisa ?'	Stadium: High Performance Training Centre; Referee: Pansa Chaisanit

==== Round 3 ====
3 October 2020	MH Nakhonsi	6–0	Nonkhamdechudom United	Bangkok
19:00	Sojirat 8'; Chadanuch 29'; Fasawang 45+', ?'; Irravadee ?'; Sirinthip ?'	Report Starting List		Stadium: High Performance Training Centre; Referee: Sunita Thongthawin

3 October 2020	Prime Bangkok	1–1	Rajpracha	Bangkok
16:00	Anootsara 22'	Report Starting List	Thanaporn ?'	Stadium: High Performance Training Centre; Referee: Thitima Wongkhan

=== Group C ===
Team	Pld	W	D	L	GF	GA	GD	Pts	Qualification
BRU Burirat Academy	3	3	0	0	10	3	+7	9	2020/21 Thai Women's League 1
Kasembundit	3	2	0	1	5	4	+1	6	2020/21 Thai Women's League 2
B.S.L. WFC	3	1	0	2	2	5	−3	3	2020/21 Thai Women's League 2
Thawi Wattana Samutsakhon United	3	0	0	3	1	6	−5	0	not be eligible for the 2020/21 season

Updated to match(es) played on 4 October 2020. Source: Thai Women's League

==== Round 1 ====
20 September 2020	Kasembundit	2–1	Thawi Wattana Samutsakhon United	Bangkok
16:00	Piyathida 43'; Rungtawan 81'	Report Starting List	Natacha 80' (pen.)	Stadium: High Performance Training Centre; Referee: Latda Yuttiput

20 September 2020	BRU Burirat Academy	4–1	B.S.L. WFC	Bangkok
16:00	Nisa 2', 45+'; Suthawan 30'; Oraya 35'	Report Starting List	Ginevra 3'	Stadium: High Performance Training Centre; Referee: Sunita Thongthawin

==== Round 2 ====
1 October 2020	Thawi Wattana Samutsakhon United	0–3	BRU Burirat Academy	Bangkok
19:00		Report Starting List	Oraya 20', 44'; Suthawan 45+'	Stadium: High Performance Training Centre; Referee: Sunita Thongthawin

1 October 2020	B.S.L. WFC	0–1	Kasembundit	Bangkok
19:00		Report Starting List	Jantakan 44'	Stadium: High Performance Training Centre; Referee: Supairi Tetthomya

==== Round 3 ====
4 October 2020	Kasembundit	2–3	BRU Burirat Academy	Bangkok
16:00	Piyathida ?'; Jantakan ?'	Report Starting List	Nisa ?', ?', ?'	Stadium: High Performance Training Centre; Referee: Pansa Chaisanit

4 October 2020	Thawi Wattana Samutsakhon United	0–1	B.S.L. WFC	Bangkok
16:00		Report Starting List	? ?'	Stadium: High Performance Training Centre; Referee: Supairi Tetthomya

=== Group D ===
Team	Pld	W	D	L	GF	GA	GD	Pts	Qualification
Chonburi FA	3	3	0	0	23	0	+23	9	2020/21 Thai Women's League 1
Khonkaen City	3	2	0	1	10	5	+5	6	2020/21 Thai Women's League 2
Bangkok Sports School	3	1	0	2	4	9	−5	3	2020/21 Thai Women's League 2
SW Samutsakhon	3	0	0	3	1	24	−23	0	not be eligible for the 2020/21 season

Updated to match(es) played on 4 October 2020. Source: Thai Women's League

==== Round 1 ====
20 September 2020	Chonburi FA	13–0	SW Samutsakhon	Bangkok
19:00	Nipawan 20', 70'; Saowalak 32', 33'; Sirikan 46'; Alisa 50', 52' (pen.), 74', 80', 90'; Siriwipa 57'; Jiraporn 65', 90+'	Report Starting List		Stadium: High Performance Training Centre; Referee: Patsaraporn Manihmut

20 September 2020	Bangkok Sports School	1–2	Khonkaen City	Bangkok
19:00	Thawanrat 37'	Report Starting List	Anupha 19'; Ploychompoo 62'	Stadium: High Performance Training Centre; Referee: Supairee Tettomya

==== Round 2 ====
1 October 2020	SW Samutsakhon	1–3	Bangkok Sports School	Bangkok
16:00	Jantira 90+'	Report Starting List	Samanya 10'; Kanyarat 12'; Ousa 86'	Stadium: High Performance Training Centre; Referee: Ananthip Poopan

1 October 2020	Khonkaen City	0–4	Chonburi FA	Bangkok
16:00		Report Starting List	Silawan 14'; Saowalak 47'; Jaruwan 60'; Alisa 85'	Stadium: High Performance Training Centre; Referee: Latda Yuttiput

==== Round 3 ====
4 October 2020	Chonburi FA	6–0	Bangkok Sports School	Bangkok
19:00	Silawan ?', ?'; Saowalak ?'; Alisa ?'; Jiraporn ?'; Ainon ?'	Report Starting List		Stadium: High Performance Training Centre; Referee: Supairee Tettomya

4 October 2020	SW Samutsakhon	0–8	Khonkaen City	Bangkok
19:00		Report Starting List	Anuthida ?', ?', ?', ?'; Khwanrudi ?'; Ploychompoo ?'; Aritsara ?'; Phapawadee ?'	Stadium: High Performance Training Centre; Referee: Ariya Kritsawong

== Qualify teams for 2020/21 Thai Women's League 1 ==
- Lampang Sports School
- BRU Burirat Academy
- MH Nakhonsi
- Chonburi FA

== Qualify teams for 2020/21 Thai Women's League 2 ==
- Lopburi City
- Prime Bangkok
- Hinkon United
- Rajpracha
- Khonkaen City
- Kasembundit
- Bangkok Sports School
- B.S.L. WFC
