= 2017 Thai Women's League =

Thai Women's League
- Season: 2017
- Matches: 27
- Goals: 148 (5.48 per match)
- Top goalscorer: Anutida Malasri; Kanyanat Chetthabutr; (8 goals)
- Highest scoring: Chonburi 17–0 BRU Burirat (25 May 2017)

The 2017 Thai Women's League (also known as the Muang Thai Women's League for sponsorship reasons) was the 4th season of the Thai Women's League, the top Thai professional league for women's association football clubs, since its establishment in 2009. A total of 10 teams will compete in the league. The season began on 22 April 2017. Fixtures for the 2017 season were announced on 21 April 2017.

BG Bundit Asia are the defending champions, having won the Thai Women's Premier League title the previous season.

== Teams ==
Locations of the Thai Women's League 2017 teams

=== Locations ===
Bangkok

- Bangkok
- Chaba Kaew 16
- Chaba Kaew 19
- Dhurakij Pundit

Buriram

- BRU Burirat

Chonburi

- Chonburi

Khon Kaen

- BG Bundit Asia

Lampang

- Lampang Grand Sport

Nakhon Si Thammarat

- Nakhon Si Lady SS

Sisaket

- Sisaket

=== Personnel and sponsoring ===
Note: Flags indicate national team as has been defined under FIFA eligibility rules. Players may hold more than one non-FIFA nationality.

Team	Head coach	Captain	Kit manufacturer	Main sponsor
Bangkok	(Thailand) TBC	(Thailand) Triratchada Boonplod	Grand Sport	(Thailand) TBC
BRU Burirat	(Thailand) TBC	(Thailand) Wimonsiri Aumdeewai	Eureka	(Thailand) TBC
BG Bundit Asia	(Thailand) TBC	(Thailand) TBC	Grand Sport	Bangkok Glass
Chaba Kaew 16	(Thailand) Noppadol Pibulvech	(Thailand) Supawadee Kiriwong	Warrix Sports	FA Thailand
Chaba Kaew 19	(Thailand) Nuengruethai Sathongwien	(Thailand) Kullasatree Jaiton	Warrix Sports	FA Thailand
Chonburi	(Thailand) TBC	(Thailand) Cheewathan Khruewan	Nike	Chang
Dhurakij Pundit	(Thailand) TBC	(Thailand) Utchakan Chaengutta	Deffo	(Thailand) TBC
Lampang Grand Sport	(Thailand) TBC	(Thailand) Janjira Tawong	Grand Sport	(Thailand) TBC
Nakhon Si Lady SS	(Thailand) Sombat Kongsawang	(Thailand) Isariya Sapa-ing	Poom Planet	Thung Song Lab Center
Sisaket	(Thailand) TBC	(Thailand) Mutita Senkram	Grand Sport	(Thailand) TBC

== League table ==
Pos	Team	Pld	W	D	L	GF	GA	GD	Pts
1	Chaba Kaew 19	11	8	0	3	38	12	+26	24
2	Dhurakij Pundit	8	7	0	1	26	6	+20	21
3	Chonburi	7	5	0	2	41	7	+34	15
4	Bangkok	8	5	0	3	25	11	+14	15
5	BG Bundit Asia	4	4	0	0	23	0	+23	12
6	Nakhon Si Lady SS	10	3	1	6	10	26	−16	10
7	Lampang Grand Sport	8	2	1	5	9	16	−7	7
8	Chaba Kaew 16	9	2	1	6	11	37	−26	7
9	Sisaket	7	1	2	4	10	31	−21	5
10	BRU Burirat	8	0	1	7	3	49	−46	1

Updated to match(es) played on 6 July 2017. Source: FA Thailand

== Results ==
=== Round 1 ===
22 April 2017	BRU Burirat	0–1	Nakhon Si Lady SS	Chonburi
15:00		Report	Pemika 52'	Stadium: I.P.E. Chonburi Campus Stadium

22 April 2017	Chaba Kaew 16	2–1	Lampang Grand Sport	Chonburi
17:00	Narisara 52'; Phenpitcha 78'	Report	Walailak 54'	Stadium: I.P.E. Chonburi Campus Stadium

23 April 2017	Sisaket	1–6	Bangkok	Chonburi
15:00	Chuthaphon 76'	Report	Anootsara 8', 59', 66'; Chanunthorn 17'; Naphat 52'; Supharat 60'	Stadium: I.P.E. Chonburi Campus Stadium

23 April 2017	Dhurakij Pundit	1–0	Chonburi	Chonburi
17:00	Sudarat 78'	Report		Stadium: I.P.E. Chonburi Campus Stadium

=== Round 2 ===
26 April 2017	Chaba Kaew 19	2–0	Bangkok	Chonburi
16:00	Anutida 76'; Kanyanat 78'	Report		Stadium: I.P.E. Chonburi Campus Stadium

26 April 2017	Chonburi	8–2	Chaba Kaew 16	Chonburi
18:00	Alisa 17', 49'; Charuwan 22'; Kanjana 40'; Warunee 50', 70'; Ainaon 71'; Saowalak 86'	Report	Chatchawan 58', 62'	Stadium: I.P.E. Chonburi Campus Stadium

=== Round 3 ===
29 April 2017	Nakhon Si Lady SS	0–4	Dhurakij Pundit	Chonburi
18:00		Report	Wilaiporn 43', 60'; Sudarat 50'; Supattra 78'	Stadium: I.P.E. Chonburi Campus Stadium

30 April 2017	BG Bundit Asia	8–0	Chaba Kaew 16	Chonburi
16:00	Khwanruedi 13', 17'; Orathai 15', 51', 59'; Darika 44'; Rattikan 47'; Orapin 57'	Report		Stadium: I.P.E. Chonburi Campus Stadium

30 April 2017	Chaba Kaew 19	2–4	Chonburi	Chonburi
18:30	Kanyanat 13'; Tipkritta 90'	Report	Taneekarn 31', 53'; Kanjana 67'; Warunee 89'	Stadium: I.P.E. Chonburi Campus Stadium

7 May 2017	BRU Burirat	0–5	Lampang Grand Sport	Khon Kaen
16:00		Report	Maliwan 20'; Walailak 42', 45', 90'; Janjira 72'	Stadium: Khon Kaen PAO. Stadium

7 May 2017	BG Bundit Asia	2–0	Chaba Kaew 19	Khon Kaen
18:30	Orathai 76'; Orapin 82'	Report		Stadium: Khon Kaen PAO. Stadium

=== Round 4 ===
10 May 2017	Dhurakij Pundit	2–0	Chaba Kaew 19	Chonburi
16:00	Sunisa 29'; Sunisa 67'	Report		Stadium: I.P.E. Chonburi Campus Stadium

10 May 2017	Chonburi	2–1	Bangkok	Chonburi
18:30	Taneekarn 52'; Pitsamai 78'	Report	Naphat 58'	Stadium: I.P.E. Chonburi Campus Stadium

11 May 2017	BRU Burirat	3–3	Sisaket	Chonburi
16:00	Ananya 34'; Phayao 55'; Supattra 60'	Report	Suttida 16', 53'; Wareeporn 45'	Stadium: I.P.E. Chonburi Campus Stadium

11 May 2017	Nakhon Si Lady SS	0–0	Lampang Grand Sport	Chonburi
18:30		Report		Stadium: I.P.E. Chonburi Campus Stadium

14 May 2017	Lampang Grand Sport	1–6	Chaba Kaew 19	Chonburi
17:00	Aranya 13'	Report	Anutida 9', 12'; Waruka 10'; Saruda 34'; Sirikan 42'; Uraiporn 70'	Stadium: I.P.E. Chonburi Campus Stadium

=== Round 5 ===
17 May 2017	Bangkok	1–3	Chaba Kaew 19	Chonburi
16:00	Supharat 75'	Report	Kanyanat 18', 23', 83'	Stadium: I.P.E. Chonburi Campus Stadium

17 May 2017	Sisaket	1–5	Nakhon Si Lady SS	Chonburi
18:30	Khanittha 72'	Report	Nattha 8', 63'; Sirintip 44'; Sojirat 49'; Jirapaporn 65'	Stadium: I.P.E. Chonburi Campus Stadium

=== Round 6 ===
24 May 2017	Lampang Grand Sport	1–2	Sisaket	Chonburi
15:00	Pornsiri 29'	Report	Panatda 21'; Chuthaphon 52'	Stadium: I.P.E. Chonburi Campus Stadium

24 May 2017	Dhurakij Pundit	1–2	Bangkok	Chonburi
17:30	Sudarat 77'	Report	Jenjira 9'; Anootsara 44'	Stadium: I.P.E. Chonburi Campus Stadium

24 May 2017	Chaba Kaew 19	5–1	Chaba Kaew 16	Chonburi
19:30	Kanyanat 6', 31', 45'; Anutida 40'; Sirikan 90'	Report	Ploychompoo 16'	Stadium: I.P.E. Chonburi Campus Stadium

25 May 2017	Nakhon Si Lady SS	0–9	BG Bundit Asia	Chonburi
16:00		Report	Rattikan 2', 10', 73'; Thanatta 15', 17'; Orathai 20', 90'; Khwanrudi 63', 88'	Stadium: I.P.E. Chonburi Campus Stadium

25 May 2017	Chonburi	17–0	BRU Burirat	Chonburi
18:30	Kanjana 8', 51', 56', 79'; Silawan 13', 38', 59'; Taneekarn 17', 27', 41'; Cheewathan 21'; Saowalak 44', 48', 60'; Pitsamai 67'; Bunyathikan 75', 87'	Report		Stadium: I.P.E. Chonburi Campus Stadium

=== Round 7 ===
31 May 2017	BRU Burirat	0–13	Chaba Kaew 19	Chonburi
16:00		Report	Uraiporn 3'; Nutwadee 9', 31', 56'; Kanchaliya 15', 30', 88'; Anutida 25', 28', 38', 40'; Kullasatree 68'; Tharnthip 83'	Stadium: I.P.E. Chonburi Campus Stadium

31 May 2017	BG Bundit Asia	4–0	Lampang Grand Sport	Chonburi
18:30	Siranya 14'; Khwanrudi 20', 64'; Sangrawee 15'	Report		Stadium: I.P.E. Chonburi Campus Stadium

1 June 2017	Chaba Kaew 16	2–7	Bangkok	Chonburi
16:00	Thanaporn 60', 65'	Report	Jenjira 4', 51', 62', 71'; Naphat 19'; Sasicha 85'; Supharat 90'	Stadium: I.P.E. Chonburi Campus Stadium

1 June 2017	Sisaket	2–5	Dhurakij Pundit	Chonburi
18:30	Suchada 3'; Suttida 46'	Report	Sudarat 14', 21'; Wilaiporn 19'; Wanida 52'; Sunisa 69'	Stadium: I.P.E. Chonburi Campus Stadium

== Season statistics ==
=== Top scorers ===
As of 1 June 2017

Rank	Player	Club	Goals
1	(Thailand) Anutida Malasri	Chaba Kaew 19	8
1	(Thailand) Kanyanat Chetthabutr	Chaba Kaew 19	8
3	(Thailand) Kanjana Sungngoen	Chonburi	6
3	(Thailand) Khwanrudi Saengchan	BG Bundit Asia	6
3	(Thailand) Taneekarn Dangda	Chonburi	6
3	(Thailand) Orathai Srimanee	BG Bundit Asia	6
7	(Thailand) Jenjira Bubpha	Bangkok	5
7	(Thailand) Sudarat Choocheun	Dhurakij Pundit	5
9	(Thailand) Anootsara Maijarern	Bangkok	4
9	(Thailand) Rattikan Thongsombut	BG Bundit Asia	4
9	(Thailand) Saowalak Pengngam	Chonburi	4
9	(Thailand) Walailak Paopa	Lampang Grand Sport	4
13	(Thailand) Kanchaliya Phimphabut	Chaba Kaew 19	3
13	(Thailand) Naphat Seesraum	Bangkok	3
13	(Thailand) Nutwadee Pram-nak	Chaba Kaew 19	3
13	(Thailand) Silawan Intamee	Chonburi	3
13	(Thailand) Supharat Sriboonhom	Bangkok	3
13	(Thailand) Suttida Suwanchairop	Sisaket	3
13	(Thailand) Warunee Phetwiset	Chonburi	3
13	(Thailand) Wilaiporn Boothduang	Dhurakij Pundit	3
21	(Thailand) Alisa Rakpinij	Chonburi	2
21	(Thailand) Bunyathikan Pasarikang	Chonburi	2
21	(Thailand) Chatchawan Rodthong	Chaba Kaew 16	2
21	(Thailand) Chuthaphon Pomngam	Sisaket	2
21	(Thailand) Nattha Thaworn	Nakhon Si Lady SS	2
21	(Thailand) Orapin Wanngoen	BG Bundit Asia	2
21	(Thailand) Pitsamai Sornsai	Chonburi	2
21	(Thailand) Sirikan Phayaknet	Dhurakij Pundit	2
21	(Thailand) Sunisa Srangthaisong	Dhurakij Pundit	2
21	(Thailand) Thanaporn Yimlamai	Chaba Kaew 16	2
21	(Thailand) Thanatta Chawong	BG Bundit Asia	2
21	(Thailand) Uraiporn Yongkul	Chaba Kaew 19	2
33	(Thailand) Ainaon Pancha	Chonburi	1
33	(Thailand) Ananya Homniam	BRU Burirat	1
33	(Thailand) Aranya Pornklin	Lampang Grand Sport	1
33	(Thailand) Cheewathan Khruewan	Chonburi	1
33	(Thailand) Chanunthorn Tiensawangpae	Bangkok	1
33	(Thailand) Charuwan Chaiyarak	Chonburi	1
33	(Thailand) Darika Peanpailun	BG Bundit Asia	1
33	(Thailand) Janjira Tawong	Lampang Grand Sport	1
33	(Thailand) Jirapaporn Damhai	Nakhon Si Lady SS	1
33	(Thailand) Khanittha Rungsang	Sisaket	1
33	(Thailand) Kullasatree Jaiton	Chaba Kaew 19	1
33	(Thailand) Maliwan Sankhamdee	Lampang Grand Sport	1
33	(Thailand) Narisara Promraksa	Chaba Kaew 16	1
33	(Thailand) Panatda Sriserm	Sisaket	1
33	(Thailand) Pemika Tanasan	Nakhon Si Lady SS	1
33	(Thailand) Phayao Kuakhanung	BRU Burirat	1
33	(Thailand) Phenpitcha Chaisida	Chaba Kaew 16	1
33	(Thailand) Ploychompoo Somnuek	Chaba Kaew 16	1
33	(Thailand) Pornsiri Jaiping	Lampang Grand Sport	1
33	(Thailand) Sangrawee Meekham	BG Bundit Asia	1
33	(Thailand) Saruda Konfai	Chaba Kaew 19	1
33	(Thailand) Sasicha Photiwong	Bangkok	1
33	(Thailand) Siranya Srimanee	BG Bundit Asia	1
33	(Thailand) Sirintip Thongmai	Nakhon Si Lady SS	1
33	(Thailand) Sojirat Praditsorn	Nakhon Si Lady SS	1
33	(Thailand) Suchada Khamjarern	Sisaket	1
33	(Thailand) Sunisa Khampinit	Dhurakij Pundit	1
33	(Thailand) Supattra Pandang	Dhurakij Pundit	1
33	(Thailand) Supattra Sila	BRU Burirat	1
33	(Thailand) Tharnthip Pandet	Chaba Kaew 19	1
33	(Thailand) Tipkritta Onsamai	Chaba Kaew 19	1
33	(Thailand) Wanida Navneet	Dhurakij Pundit	1
33	(Thailand) Wareeporn Thongnumthiang	Sisaket	1
33	(Thailand) Waruka Srisan	Chaba Kaew 19	1

=== Hat-tricks ===
Player	For	Against	Result	Date
(Thailand) Anootsara Maijarern	Bangkok	Sisaket	6–1	23 April 2017
(Thailand) Orathai Srimanee	BG Bundit Asia	Chaba Kaew 16	8–0	30 April 2017
(Thailand) Walailak Paopa	Lampang Grand Sport	BRU Burirat	5–0	7 May 2017
(Thailand) Kanyanat Chetthabutr	Chaba Kaew 19	Bangkok	3–1	17 May 2017
(Thailand) Kanyanat Chetthabutr	Chaba Kaew 19	Chaba Kaew 16	5–1	24 May 2017
(Thailand) Rattikan Thongsombut	BG Bundit Asia	Nakhon Si Lady SS	9–0	25 May 2017
(Thailand) Taneekarn Dangda	Chonburi	BRU Burirat	17–0	25 May 2017
(Thailand) Kanjana Sungngoen	Chonburi	BRU Burirat	17–0	25 May 2017
(Thailand) Silawan Intamee	Chonburi	BRU Burirat	17–0	25 May 2017
(Thailand) Saowalak Pengngam	Chonburi	BRU Burirat	17–0	25 May 2017
(Thailand) Nutwadee Pram-nak	Chaba Kaew 19	BRU Burirat	13–0	31 May 2017
(Thailand) Kanchaliya Phimphabut	Chaba Kaew 19	BRU Burirat	13–0	31 May 2017
(Thailand) Jenjira Bubpha	Bangkok	Chaba Kaew 16	7–2	1 June 2017

== See also ==
- 2017 Thai League 1
- 2017 Thai League 2
- 2017 Thai League 3
- 2017 Thai League 4
