= 2020–21 Thai Women's League =

Thai Women's League
- Season: 2020–21
- Champions: BG Bundit Asia (4th title)

The 2020–21 Thai Women's League 1 was the sixth season of the Thai Women's League, the top Thai professional league for women's association football clubs, since its establishment in 2009. A total of 8 teams will compete in the league. The season will run from 31 October 2020 to 27 March 2021

== Teams ==
Divided into teams placed around the league (Member organizations that are Semi-Final in 2019 Thai Women's League) 4 teams.

- Chonburi Sports School
- BG Bundit Asia
- Bangkok
- Air Force

And teams from the 2020–21 Thai Women's League play-offs round. 4 teams.

- Lampang Sports School
- BRU Burirat Academy
- MH Nakhonsi
- Chonburi FA

== Rules ==
The 2020–21 Thai Women's League 1 will divide the competition into 2 legs, in the first leg will compete in a meeting, compete at High Performance Training Center (Thailand), where the 1st leg is placed 1–4.Second leg will compete in a meet again Home-Away, within 1–4 places with each other to find the winning team, while 5–8 places at the end of the first leg will compete as a home-away match. And meet each other within the 5th–8th place as well. For the 6th – 7th place will compete in the playoff round with the 2nd – 3rd place from the 2020–21 Thai Women's League 2.

== First leg ==
=== League table ===
Pos	Team	Pld	W	D	L	GF	GA	GD	Pts	Qualification
1	Chonburi FA	7	6	1	0	24	7	+17	19	Championship Group on Second leg
2	BG Bundit Asia	7	5	1	1	31	3	+28	16	Championship Group on Second leg
3	Bangkok	7	4	0	3	27	8	+19	12	Championship Group on Second leg
4	MH Nakhonsi	7	3	2	2	11	10	+1	11	Championship Group on Second leg
5	BRU Burirat Academy	7	2	2	3	8	16	−8	8	Relegation Group on Second leg
6	Chonburi Sports School	7	2	1	4	15	38	−23	7	Relegation Group on Second leg
7	Air Force	7	2	1	4	10	24	−14	7	Relegation Group on Second leg
8	Lampang Sports School	7	0	0	7	4	24	−20	0	Relegation Group on Second leg

Updated to match(es) played on 1 November 2020. Source: Thai Women's League
Rules for classification: 1) Points; 2) Head-to-head points; 3) Head-to-head goals difference; 4) Head-to-head goals scored; 5) Overall goals difference; 6) Overall goals scored; 7) Fair play points; 8) Play-off without extra time;).

== Second leg ==
=== League table ===
Pos	Team	Pld	W	D	L	GF	GA	GD	Pts	Qualification
1	BG Bundit Asia	6	5	1	0	13	2	+11	16	Champions and 2022 AFC Women's Club Championship
2	Chonburi FA	6	3	1	2	8	10	−2	10	
3	Bangkok	6	3	0	3	8	5	+3	9	
4	MH Nakhonsi	6	0	0	6	3	15	−12	0	
5	Lampang Sports School	6	5	1	0	18	4	+14	16	
6	BRU Burirat Academy	6	4	1	1	7	7	0	13	Qualification for Relegation Playoffs
7	Chonburi Sports School	6	2	0	4	3	6	−3	6	Qualification for Relegation Playoffs
8	Air Force	6	0	0	6	3	14	−11	0	Relegation to the 2021–22 Thai Women's League 2

Source: Thai Women's League
Rules for classification: 1) Points; 2) Head-to-head points; 3) Head-to-head goals difference; 4) Head-to-head goals scored; 5) Overall goals difference; 6) Overall goals scored; 7) Fair play points; 8) Play-off without extra time;).

==== Macthday 1 ====
31 October 2020	Chonburi FA	5–2	Air Force	Bangkok
16:00	Saowalak 9', 25'; Treesara 34' (o.g.); Alisa 46'; Nipawan 71'	Report VideoStarting List	Kwanruethai 61' (pen.); Jirapaporn 83'	Stadium: High Performance Training Centre; Referee: Pansa Chaisanit

31 October 2020	BRU Burirat Academy	2–2	Chonburi Sports School	Bangkok
19:00	Nisa 17'; Oraya 26'	Report Video Starting List	Pluemjai 56'; Suchavadee 65'	Stadium: High Performance Training Centre; Referee: Sunita Thongthawin

1 November 2020	Bangkok	2–1	MH Nakhonsi	Bangkok
16:00	Taneekarn 17', 82'	Report Video(First Half) Video(Second Half) Starting List	Chadanuch 52'	Stadium: High Performance Training Centre; Referee: Ananthip Poopan

1 November 2020	Lampang Sports School	0–5	BG Bundit Asia	Bangkok
19:00		Report Video Starting List	Kanyanat 22', 71'; Sangrawee 53'; Ploychompoo 76'; Tanakron 90+'	Stadium: High Performance Training Centre; Referee: Patsaraporn Manihmut

==== Macthday 2 ====
7 November 2020	BG Bundit Asia	6–0	BRU Burirat Academy	Bangkok
16:00		[ Report] [ Video][ Starting List]		Stadium: High Performance Training Centre

7 November 2020	Lampang Sports School	0–6	Bangkok	Bangkok
19:00		[ Report] [ Video] [ Starting List]		Stadium: High Performance Training Centre

8 November 2020	MH Nakhonsi	1–1	Air Force	Bangkok
16:00		[Report] [Video] [Starting List]		Stadium: High Performance Training Centre

8 November 2020	Chonburi Sports School	2–5	Chonburi FA	Bangkok
19:00		[ Report] [ Video] [Starting List]		Stadium: High Performance Training Centre

==== Macthday 3 ====
14 November 2020	Chonburi FA	–	MH Nakhonsi	Bangkok
16:00		[ Report] [ Video][ Starting List]		Stadium: High Performance Training Centre

14 November 2020	Chonburi Sports School	–	BG Bundit Asia	Bangkok
19:00		[ Report] [ Video] [ Starting List]		Stadium: High Performance Training Centre

15 November 2020	BRU Burirat Academy	0–4	Bangkok	Bangkok
16:00		[Report] [Video] [Starting List]		Stadium: High Performance Training Centre

15 November 2020	Air Force	2–1	Lampang Sports School	Bangkok
19:00		[ Report] [ Video] [Starting List]		Stadium: High Performance Training Centre

==== Macthday 4 ====
21 November 2020	Lampang Sports School	1–2	MH Nakhonsi	Bangkok
16:00		[ Report] [ Video][ Starting List]		Stadium: High Performance Training Centre

21 November 2020	BG Bundit Asia	1–1	Chonburi FA	Bangkok
19:00		[ Report] [ Video] [ Starting List]		Stadium: High Performance Training Centre

22 November 2020	Bangkok	12–0	Chonburi Sports School	Bangkok
16:00		[Report] [Video] [Starting List]		Stadium: High Performance Training Centre

22 November 2020	BRU Burirat Academy	4–1	Air Force	Bangkok
19:00		[ Report] [ Video] [Starting List]		Stadium: High Performance Training Centre

==== Macthday 5 ====
5 December 2020	Chonburi Sports School	5–2	Air Force	Bangkok
16:00		[ Report] [ Video][ Starting List]		Stadium: High Performance Training Centre

5 December 2020	BG Bundit Asia	2–0	Bangkok	Bangkok
19:00		[ Report] [ Video] [ Starting List]		Stadium: High Performance Training Centre

6 December 2020	Chonburi FA	4–0	Lampang Sports School	Bangkok
16:00		[Report] [Video] [Starting List]		Stadium: High Performance Training Centre

6 December 2020	MH Nakhonsi	1–1	BRU Burirat Academy	Bangkok
19:00		[ Report] [ Video] [Starting List]		Stadium: High Performance Training Centre

==== Macthday 6 ====
12 December 2020	BRU Burirat Academy	1–0	Lampang Sports School	Bangkok
16:00		[ Report] [ Video][ Starting List]		Stadium: High Performance Training Centre

12 December 2020	Chonburi Sports School	1–5	MH Nakhonsi	Bangkok
19:00		[ Report] [ Video] [ Starting List]		Stadium: High Performance Training Centre

13 December 2020	Air Force	0–7	BG Bundit Asia	Bangkok
16:00		[Report] [Video] [Starting List]		Stadium: High Performance Training Centre

13 December 2020	Bangkok	2–3	Chonburi FA	Bangkok
19:00		[ Report] [ Video] [Starting List]		Stadium: High Performance Training Centre

==== Macthday 7 ====
19 December 2020	Bangkok	1–2	Air Force	Bangkok
16:00		[ Report] [ Video][ Starting List]		Stadium: High Performance Training Centre

19 December 2020	Chonburi FA	2–0	BRU Burirat Academy	Bangkok
19:00		[ Report] [ Video] [ Starting List]		Stadium: High Performance Training Centre

20 December 2020	Lampang Sports School	2–4	Chonburi Sports School	Bangkok
16:00		[Report] [Video] [Starting List]		Stadium: High Performance Training Centre

20 December 2020	BG Bundit Asia	0–1	MH Nakhonsi	Bangkok
19:00		[ Report] [ Video] [Starting List]		Stadium: High Performance Training Centre
