= 2019 Thai Women's League =

Fifth season of a Thai women's football league

Thai Women's League
- Season: 2019
- Champions: Chonburi; BG Bundit Asia (Share)
- Matches: 52
- Goals: 262 (5.04 per match)
- Top goalscorer: Jaruwan Chairuk; Kanyanat Chetthabutr (12 Goals)
- Highest scoring: Thammasat University 0–12 Chonburi (6 April 2019)
- Longest winning run: Chonburi (10 matches)
- Longest unbeaten run: Chonburi (11 matches)
- Longest winless run: Thammasat University (10 matches)
- Longest losing run: Thammasat University (10 matches)

The 2019 Thai Women's League was the fifth season of the Thai Women's League, the top Thai professional league for women's association football clubs, since its establishment in 2009. A total of 11 teams competed in the league. The season began on 26 January 2019.

== Teams ==
- Air Force
- Bangkok
- BG Bundit Asia
- Chonburi
- Kasem Bundit University
- Lampang Sports School
- Nakhon Si Lady
- Sisaket Sports School
- Thailand U-16
- Thailand U-19
- Thammasat University

== Format ==
The league is divided into 2 rounds. The first round is divided into 2 groups, 6 teams, with the Thailand U-16 in the group as a stand. For Group B, there are 5 teams in Thailand. Thailand U-19 is a standing team, if any team with the top 2 highest scores of each group Will go through to play in the final

=== Personnel and sponsoring ===
Note: Flags indicate national team as has been defined under FIFA eligibility rules. Players may hold more than one non-FIFA nationality.

Team	Head coach	Captain	Kit manufacturer	Main sponsor
Air Force	(Thailand) TBC	(Thailand) TBC		(Thailand) TBC
Bangkok	(Thailand) TBC	(Thailand) TBC	Grand Sport	(Thailand) TBC
BG Bundit Asia	(Thailand) TBC	(Thailand) TBC	Grand Sport	LEO
Chonburi	(Thailand) TBC	(Thailand) TBC	Neecon	AIA Group
Kasem Bundit University	(Thailand) TBC	(Thailand) TBC		
Lampang Sports School	(Thailand) TBC	(Thailand) TBC	Grand Sport	Surin Suwan
Nakhon Si Lady SS	(Thailand) TBC	(Thailand) TBC	Neecon	Neecon
Sisaket Sports School	(Thailand) TBC	(Thailand) TBC	Warrix Sports	SSKSS
Thailand U-16	(Thailand) TBC	(Thailand) TBC	Warrix Sports	FA Thailand
Thailand U-19	(Thailand) TBC	(Thailand) TBC	Warrix Sports	FA Thailand
Thammasat University	(Thailand) TBC	(Thailand) TBC		kumchoo stadium

== Groups ==
Group A	Group B
Thailand U-16 (Stand team); Chonburi; Bangkok; Lampang Sports School; Nakhon Si Lady; Thammasat University	Thailand U-19 (Stand team); BG Bundit Asia; Air Force; Kasem Bundit University; Sisaket Sports School

== League table ==
=== Group A ===
Team	Pld	W	D	L	GF	GA	GD	Pts
Chonburi	10	10	0	0	52	2	+50	30
Bangkok	10	6	2	2	34	10	+24	20
Nakhon Si Lady SS	10	5	2	3	23	14	+9	17
Thailand U-16	10	4	2	4	19	17	+2	14
Lampang Sports School	10	2	0	8	18	37	−19	6
Thammasat University	10	0	0	10	3	69	−66	0

Source=FA Thailand

==== Round 1 ====
26 January 2019	Bangkok	4–0	Thammasat University	Bangkok
16:30	Triratchada 13'; Suparat 37'; Jenjira 52', 58'	Report		Stadium: High Performance Training Centre

==== Round 2 ====
7 February 2019	Chonburi	6–0	Lampang Sports School	Bangkok
15:30	Saowalak 6', 17'; Sirikan 15', 32'; Silawan 20'; Jaruwan 67'	Report		Stadium: High Performance Training Centre

7 February 2019	Nakhon Si Lady SS	0–0	Thailand U-16	Bangkok
17:00		Report		Stadium: High Performance Training Centre

==== Round 3 ====
9 February 2019	Chonburi	5–0	Nakhon Si Lady SS	Bangkok
15:30	Silawan 10'; Supawadee 30' (o.g.); Saowalak 58'; Jaruwan 65'; Sirikan 90+'	Report		Stadium: High Performance Training Centre

9 February 2019	Lampang Sports School	3–1	Thammasat University	Bangkok
16:00	Aranya 38', 66'; Janejira 75'	Report	Phakchira 90+2'	Stadium: High Performance Training Centre

9 February 2019	Thailand U-16	0–2	Bangkok	Bangkok
19:00		Report	Suparat 51'; Trirachada 51'	Stadium: High Performance Training Centre

==== Round 4 ====
14 February 2019	Chonburi	9–0	Thammasat University	Bangkok
15:30	Rothenburg 5'; Saowalak 23', 24'; Sirikan 35', 75'; Jaruwan 41', 85'; Saruda 51'; Orawan 72'	Report Video		Stadium: High Performance Training Centre

14 February 2019	Bangkok	1–1	Nakhon Si Lady SS	Bangkok
16:00	Jenjira 43'	Report Video	Jirapaporn 54'	Stadium: High Performance Training Centre

14 February 2019	Lampang Sports School	1–4	Thailand U-16	Bangkok
19:00	Aranya 74'	Report Video	Chanisata 33'; Pleumjai 41' (pen.); Suchawadee 51'; Kwanjira 70'	Stadium: High Performance Training Centre

==== Round 5 ====
16 February 2019	Nakhon Si Lady SS	5–0	Thammasat University	Bangkok
15:30	Arisa 16', 67'; Sirinthip 19', 62', 77'	Report Video		Stadium: High Performance Training Centre

==== Round 6 ====
20 February 2019	Thammasat University	0–1	Thailand U-16	Bangkok
17:00		Report Video	Chatya 5'	Stadium: High Performance Training Centre

20 February 2019	Lampang Sports School	2–4	Nakhon Si Lady SS	Bangkok
19:15	Chidchanok 59', 74' (pen.)	Report Video	Arisa 5', 84'; Isariya 81' (pen.); Jirapaporn 90+1'	Stadium: High Performance Training Centre

==== Round 7 ====
28 February 2019	Bangkok	2–0	Lampang Sports School	Bangkok
16:00	Saharuthai 33'; Trirachada 45+2'	Report Video		Stadium: High Performance Training Centre

28 February 2019	Thailand U-16	1–4	Chonburi	Bangkok
19:00	Thawanrat 75'	Report Video	Jaruwan 45', 90+4'; Waluka 49'; Martinet 52'	Stadium: High Performance Training Centre

==== Round 8 ====
14 March 2019	Chonburi	3–0	Bangkok	Bangkok
16:00	Saowalak 22', 74'; Alisa 90+'	Report		Stadium: High Performance Training Centre

==== Round 9 ====
16 March 2019	Bangkok	1–3	Chonburi	Bangkok
17:00	Suparat 19'	Report	Alisa 17'; Sirikan 20'; Jaruwan 72'	Stadium: High Performance Training Centre

16 March 2019	Nakhon Si Lady SS	3–0	Lampang Sports School	Bangkok
19:15	Kojirat 61'; Jirapaporn 66', 90+'	Report		Stadium: High Performance Training Centre

==== Round 10 ====
28 March 2019	Thammasat University	1–8	Nakhon Si Lady SS	Bangkok
16:00	Natthawadee 87'	Report	Jirapaporn 18'; Isariya 19' (pen.); Arisa 24', 43', 65'; Juthamat 45+'; Sirinthip 87'; Supawadee 90+'	Stadium: High Performance Training Centre

28 March 2019	Chonburi	3–0	Thailand U-16	Bangkok
19:15	Jaruwan 8'; Sirikan 21'; Nipawan 58'	Report		Stadium: High Performance Training Centre

==== Round 11 ====
30 March 2019	Lampang Sports School	11–0	Thammasat University	Bangkok
16:00	Walailak 3', 45+', 62'; Aranya 7'; Nawathan 30'; Narirat 33'; Suwanna 64', 75', 77'; Woraya 83'; Sirikanya 90+'	Report		Stadium: High Performance Training Centre

30 March 2019	Thailand U-16	0–2	Nakhon Si Lady SS	Bangkok
17:00		Report	Sirinthip 46', 90+'	Stadium: High Performance Training Centre

==== Round 12 ====
4 April 2019	Thailand U-16	6–1	Thammasat University	Bangkok
19:15	Pleumjai 10' (pen.); Chatya 36'; Umaporn 45+'; Fasawang 58'; Thawanrat 58'; Chanisata 75'	Report	Wanwisa 64'	Stadium: High Performance Training Centre

==== Round 13 ====
6 April 2019	Thammasat University	0–12	Chonburi	Bangkok
16:00		Report	Saruda 11'; Jaruwan 14', 39', 45+'; Waluka 19'; Kullasattri 31', 41'; Sirikan 43'; Sunisa 66'; Kritika 70', 84'; Chingduang 82'	Stadium: High Performance Training Centre

6 April 2019	Nakhon Si Lady	0–1	Bangkok	Bangkok
18:00		Report	Jenjira 88'	Stadium: High Performance Training Centre

6 April 2019	Thailand U-16	4–1	Lampang Sports School	Bangkok
19:15	Fasawang 22'; Chatya 59', 73'; Suchawadee 90+'	Report	Satirat 50' (pen.)	Stadium: High Performance Training Centre

==== Round 14 ====
18 April 2019	Lampang Sports School	0–10	Bangkok	Bangkok
16:00		Report	Muthita 8', 24', 59', 90+'; Jenjira 9', 25', 29', 48', 68'; Suparat 17'	Stadium: High Performance Training Centre

18 April 2019	Nakhon Si Lady SS	0–4	Chonburi Sports School	Bangkok
19:15		Report	Silawan 65'; Saowalak 81', 86', 90+'	Stadium: High Performance Training Centre

==== Round 15 ====
20 April 2019	Chonburi	3–0	Lampang Sports School	Bangkok
16:00	Waluka 14'; Jaruwan 40'; Thitima 45+'	Report Video		Stadium: High Performance Training Centre

20 April 2019	Thammasat University	0–10	Bangkok	Bangkok
19:15		Report Video	Muthita 8', 12', 28'; Sutinan 16', 31', 43', 45'; Haruthai 18', 21', 36'	Stadium: High Performance Training Centre; Referee: This match finished at half-time because Thammasat University players have less than 7 players. So the competition manager decide Bangkok won 10-0.

==== Round 16 ====
25 April 2019	Bangkok	3–3	Thailand U-16	Bangkok
16:00	Panittha 38' (pen.); Patcharaporn 45+'; Piyathida 52'	Report Video	Yupawadee 20' (o.g.); Pleumjai 30'; Thawanrat 76'	Stadium: High Performance Training Centre

=== Group B ===
Team	Pld	W	D	L	GF	GA	GD	Pts
BG Bundit Asia	8	8	0	0	38	2	+36	24
Air Force	8	6	0	2	33	10	+23	18
Thailand U-19	8	4	0	4	19	12	+7	12
Sisaket Sports School	8	1	0	7	13	39	−26	3
Kasem Bundit University	8	1	0	7	6	46	−40	3

Source=FA Thailand

==== Round 1 ====
27 January 2019	Air Force	6–0	Kasem Bundit University	Bangkok
13:30	Kwanruthai 6', 25', -', 45+', 60'; Sunisa 20'	Report		Stadium: High Performance Training Centre

==== Round 2 ====
7 February 2019	Thailand U-19	6–1	Sisaket Sports School	Bangkok
19:00	Thanakorn 39'; Nutwadee 45' (pen.); Ratchaphan 60'; Phattharanan 73', 81', 85'	Report	Somruedee 74'	Stadium: High Performance Training Centre

==== Round 3 ====
9 February 2019	Air Force	9–0	Sisaket Sports School	Bangkok
15:30	Sunisa 15', 21', 45+'; Kwanruthai 19'; Panarai 50'; Taneekarn 54', 75'; Kanjana 61'; Duangnapa 90+'	Report		Stadium: High Performance Training Centre

9 February 2019	BG Bundit Asia	3–0	Thailand U-19	Bangkok
19:00	Kanyanat 34', 65'; Rattikan 90+'	Report		Stadium: High Performance Training Centre

==== Round 4 ====
14 February 2019	Sisaket Sports School	1–5	BG Bundit Asia	Bangkok
15:30	Oraphan 81'	Report Video	Kanyanat 3', 17'; Thanatta 27'; Orapin 46'; Rattikan 71'	Stadium: High Performance Training Centre

14 February 2019	Thailand U-19	2–0	Kasem Bundit University	Bangkok
19:00	Pariyapat 32', 61'	Report Video		Stadium: High Performance Training Centre

==== Round 5 ====
16 February 2019	Kasem Bundit University	0–8	BG Bundit Asia	Bangkok
16:00		Report Video	Thanatta 12', 39', 42'; Rattikan 30', 54'; Phornphirun 67'; Kanyanat 75', 81'	Stadium: High Performance Training Centre

16 February 2019	Air Force	2–1	Thailand U-19	Bangkok
19:00	Kwanruthai 61'; Wilaiporn 88'	Report Video	Siriwipha 66'	Stadium: High Performance Training Centre

==== Round 6 ====
20 February 2019	Sisaket Sports School	7–2	Kasem Bundit University	Bangkok
16:00	Duangjai 18', 20'; Somruedee 21'; Muttita 45' (pen.); Chanjira 50'; Supattra 61'	Report	Amornmat 10', 34'	Stadium: High Performance Training Centre

==== Round 7 ====
14 March 2019	BG Bundit Asia	4–1	Air Force	Bangkok
19:15	Thanakorn 20', 28'; Phornphirun 50'; Orapin 69'	Report	Sunisa 90+'	Stadium: High Performance Training Centre

==== Round 8 ====
16 March 2019	Kasem Bundit University	3–2	Sisaket Sports School	Bangkok
16:00	Wipadee 3'; Phenluk 33'; Amornmat 51'	Report	Supattra 50'; Wilai 74' (o.g.)	Stadium: High Performance Training Centre

==== Round 9 ====
28 March 2019	Thailand U-19	1–2	Air Force	Bangkok
16:00	Anupha 79'	Report	Kanjana 10' (pen.); Sunisa 60'	Stadium: High Performance Training Centre

28 March 2019	BG Bundit Asia	7–0	Kasem Bundit University	Bangkok
19:15	Kanyanat 12', 38'; Kwanruthai 17'; Rattikan 52', 71'; Thanakorn 85'; Orapin 89'	Report		Stadium: High Performance Training Centre

==== Round 10 ====
30 March 2019	Sisaket Sports School	1–4	Air Force	Bangkok
19:15	Somruedee 49'	Report	Panarai 24'; Wilaiporn 26', 67'; Warunee 74'	Stadium: High Performance Training Centre

==== Round 11 ====
4 April 2019	Air Force	0–3	BG Bundit Asia	Bangkok
16:00		Report	Kanyanat 15', 69'; Orapin 29'	Stadium: High Performance Training Centre

==== Round 12 ====
6 April 2019	BG Bundit Asia	6–0	Sisaket Sports School	Bangkok
16:00	Sunisa 8'; Phornphirun 59'; Khwanrudi 71', 83'; Orathai 72', 89'	Report		Stadium: High Performance Training Centre

6 April 2019	Kasem Bundit University	1–5	Thailand U-19	Bangkok
19:15	Pornthip 51'	Report	Anupha 13', 70'; Ploychompoo 37'; Thanaporn 42'; Duangjai 61'	Stadium: High Performance Training Centre

==== Round 13 ====
20 April 2019	Air Force	9–0	Kasem Bundit University	Bangkok
16:00	Warunee 2', 8', 51', 72'; Wilaiporn 20', 50', 74'; Panarai 70'; Taneekarn 90+1'	Report Video		Stadium: High Performance Training Centre

20 April 2019	Sisaket Sports School	1–4	Thailand U-19	Bangkok
19:15	Kanitha 56'	Report Video	Nadia 6', 65'; Thanaporn 45'; Ratsamee 90+2' (o.g.)	Stadium: High Performance Training Centre

==== Round 14 ====
25 April 2019	Thailand U-19	0–2	BG Bundit Asia	Bangkok
19:15		Report Video	Kanyanat 30'; Khwanrudi 52'	Stadium: High Performance Training Centre

=== Bracket ===
Semi-finals
2 May – Bangkok
Chonburi Sports School (p)	0 (4)
Air Force	0 (3)
2 May – Bangkok
Bangkok	2 (2)
BG Bundit Asia (p)	2 (3)

Final
11 May – Bangkok
Chonburi Sports School	C
BG Bundit Asia	C
Third place
11 May – Bangkok
Bangkok	C
Air Force	C

=== Semi-final ===
2 May 2019	Chonburi	0–0 (4–3 p)	Air Force	Bangkok
16:30		Report Video		Stadium: 72nd Anniversary Stadium
	Penalties
	Suchawadee (penalty scored); Inno (penalty scored); Nipawan (penalty scored); Silawan (penalty scored); Pitsamai (penalty missed)		(penalty scored) Sunisa; (penalty missed) Wilaiporn; (penalty scored) Kanjana; (penalty scored) Taneekarn; (penalty missed) Warunee

2 May 2019	Bangkok	2–2 (2–3 p)	BG Bundit Asia	Bangkok
19:30	Jenjira 9'; Suparat 20'	Report Video	Kanyanat 40'; Khwanrudi 54'	Stadium: 72nd Anniversary Stadium
	Penalties
	Jenjira (penalty missed); Muthita (penalty missed); Hathaichanok (penalty scored); Triratchada (penalty scored); Panittha (penalty missed)		(penalty scored) Khwanrudi; (penalty missed) Orapin; (penalty scored) Sunisa; (penalty scored) Pikul

=== Third place play-off ===
11 May 2019	Bangkok	Cancel	Air Force	Bangkok
16:30		Report		Stadium: 72nd Anniversary Stadium

Third Place shared

=== Final ===
11 May 2019	Chonburi	Cancel	BG Bundit Asia	Bangkok
19:30		Report		Stadium: 72nd Anniversary Stadium

Winners shared

- Because if an athlete still competes in the same women's league football program There may be a risk that will affect the national team athletes. In the most important list of 2019 FIFA Women's World Cup

== Season statistics ==
=== Top goalscorers ===
Rank	Player	Club	Goals
1	(Thailand) Jaruwan Chairuk	Chonburi	12
1	(Thailand) Kanyanat Chetthabutr	BG Bundit Asia	12
4	(Thailand) Saowalak Pengngam	Chonburi	10
4	(Thailand) Jenjira Bubpha	Bangkok	10
6	(Thailand) Sirikan Phayaknet	Chonburi	8
6	(Thailand) Muthita Senkram	Bangkok	8
8	(Thailand) Arisa Krainara	Nakhon Si Lady SS	7
8	(Thailand) Kwanruthai Kunupatham	Air Force	7
12	(Thailand) Rattikan Thongsombut	BG Bundit Asia	6
12	(Thailand) Sirinthip Thongmai	Nakhon Si Lady SS	6
12	(Thailand) Sunisa Kamphinij	Air Force	6
12	(Thailand) Wilaiporn Boothduang	Air Force	6
15	(Thailand) Jirapaporn Dumhai	Nakhon Si Lady SS	5
15	(Thailand) Suparat Sriboonhome	Bangkok	5
15	(Thailand) Warunee Phetwiset	Air Force	5
21	(Thailand) Chatya Prathumkun	Thailand U-16	4
21	(Thailand) Khwanrudi Saengchan	BG Bundit Asia	4
21	(Thailand) Aranya Pornklin	Lampang Sports School	4
21	(Thailand) Sutinan Samphatthonglaen	BG Bundit Asia	4
21	(Thailand) Thanatta Chawong	Bangkok	4
21	(Thailand) Orapin Waenngoen	BG Bundit Asia	4
34	15 Players	8 Teams	3
51	17 Players	9 Teams	2
92	41 Players	11 Teams	1
