= Chatchawan Rodthong =

Thai footballer (born 2002)

Personal information
- Full name: Chatchawan Rodthong
- Date of birth: 22 June 2002 (age 24)
- Place of birth: Thailand
- Height: 1.64 m (5 ft 5 in)
- Position: Midfielder

Senior career*
Years	Team	Apps	(Gls)
–2023	Bangkok WFC		
2023–2024	Mynavi Sendai	0	(0)

International career
2022–	Thailand	9	(0)
- * Club domestic league appearances and goals

Chatchawan Rodthong (Thai: ชัชวัลย์ รอดทอง; born 22 June 2002) is a Thai footballer who plays as a midfielder.

== Early life ==
Rodthong was a Thailand youth international. She captained the Thailand women's national under-16 football team.

== Club career ==
Rodthong played for Thai side Bangkok WFC. In 2023, she signed for Japanese side Mynavi Sendai.

== Style of play ==
Rodthong mainly operates as a midfielder. She can also operate as a defender.

== International goals ==
No.	Date	Venue	Opponent	Score	Result	Competition
1.	10 May 2022	Cẩm Phả Stadium, Cẩm Phả, Vietnam	Singapore	3–0	3–0	2021 Southeast Asian Games
2.	15 May 2022	Cẩm Phả Stadium, Cẩm Phả, Vietnam	Laos	1–0	5–0	2021 Southeast Asian Games
3.	13 August 2023	Tsing Yi Sports Ground, Tsing Yi, Hong Kong	Hong Kong	1–0	5–0	Friendly
4.	2 June 2025	Thammasat Stadium, Pathum Thani, Thailand	Nepal	1–0	2–0	Friendly
5.	5 July 2025	700th Anniversary Stadium, Chiang Mai, Thailand	India	1–1	1–2	2026 AFC Women's Asian Cup qualification

== Personal life ==
Rodthong was born in 2002 in Thailand. She has regarded Spain international Andres Iniesta as her football idol.
