= Warunee Phetwiset =

Thai footballer (born 1990)

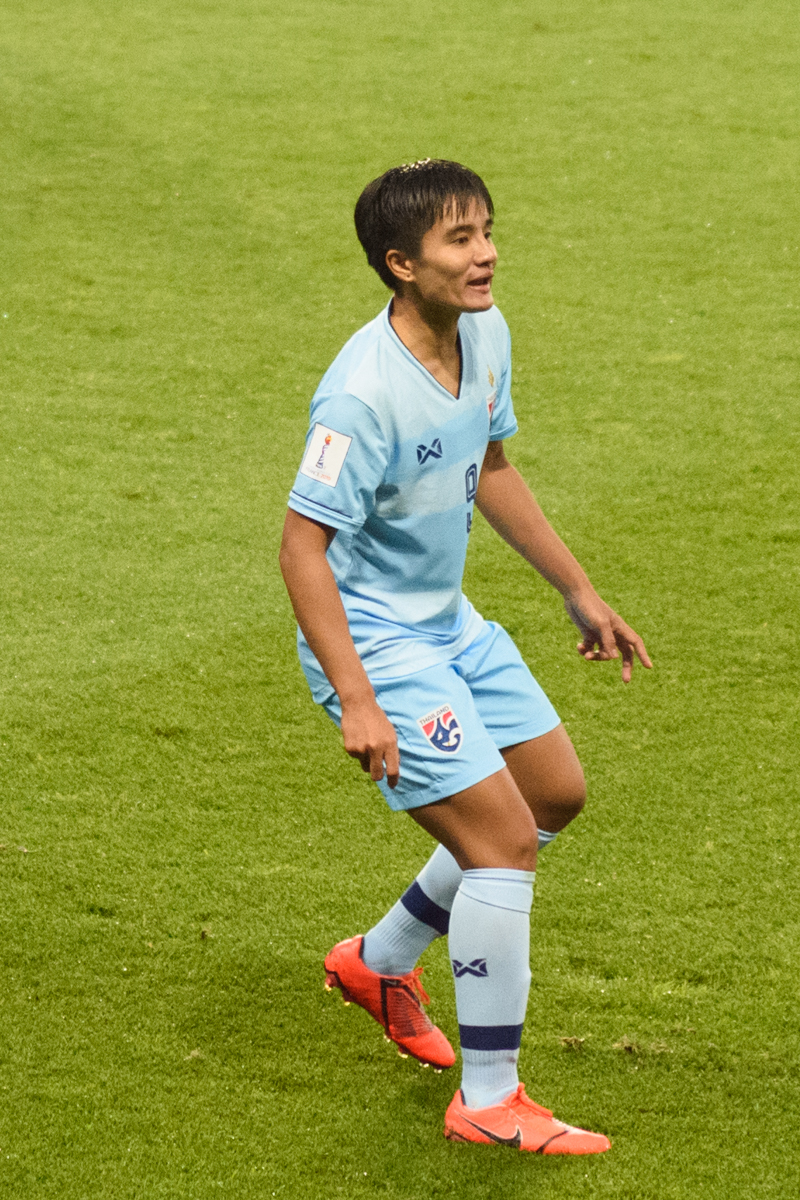

Personal information
- Full name: Warunee Phetwiset
- Date of birth: 13 December 1990 (age 35)
- Place of birth: Nakhon Ratchasima, Thailand
- Height: 1.53 m (5 ft 0 in)
- Position: Defender

Senior career*
Years	Team	Apps	(Gls)
-2021	Chonburi		
2022	MH Nakhonsi City		
2023	Bangkok		

International career^{‡}
2014–	Thailand	100	(0)
- * Club domestic league appearances and goals ‡ National team caps and goals as of 22:31, 17 June 2015 (UTC)

Warunee Phetwiset (Thai: วารุณี เพ็ชรวิเศษ born 13 December 1990) is a Thai international footballer who plays as a midfielder.

== Honours ==
=== International ===
Thailand

- AFC Women's Championship
  - Fourth Place: 2018
  - Fifth Place: 2014
- AFF Women's Championship: 2011, 2015, 2016, 2018
- Southeast Asian Games: Gold Medal: 2013
