= Ainon Phancha =

Thai footballer (born 1992)

Personal information
- Full name: Ainon Phancha
- Date of birth: 26 January 1992 (age 34)
- Place of birth: Roi Et, Thailand
- Height: 1.61 m (5 ft 3 1/2 in)
- Position: Midfielder

International career^{‡}
Years	Team	Apps	(Gls)
2014–2019	Thailand	16	(4)
- ‡ National team caps and goals as of 13:25, 12 June 2019 (UTC)

Ainon Phancha (Thai : อินทร์อร พันธุ์ชา, born 26 January 1992) is a Thai former footballer who played as a midfielder.

== International goals ==
No.	Date	Venue	Opponent	Score	Result	Competition
1.	14 December 2013	Mandalarthiri Stadium, Mandalay, Myanmar	Malaysia	3–0	6–1	2013 Southeast Asian Games
2.	16 December 2013	Mandalarthiri Stadium, Mandalay, Myanmar	Laos	2–0	5–0	2013 Southeast Asian Games
3.	12 December 2017	Thunderdome Stadium, Nonthaburi, Thailand	Jordan	1–0	1–2	Friendly
4.	27 May 2018	Gelora Sriwijaya Stadium, Palembang, Indonesia	Indonesia	6–0	13–0	Friendly
