= Nutwadee Pramnak =

Thai footballer (born 2000)

Personal information
- Full name: Nutwadee Pramnak
- Date of birth: 9 October 2000 (age 26)
- Place of birth: Phitsanulok, Thailand
- Height: 1.60 m (5 ft 3 in)
- Position: Midfielder

Team information
- Current team: AC Nagano Parceiro
- Number: 25

College career
Years	Team	Apps	(Gls)
2021	UNC Pembroke Braves	10	(1)

Senior career*
Years	Team	Apps	(Gls)
- Kasetsart University
	AC Nagano Parceiro	1	(0)

International career^{‡}
2019	Thailand U19	2	(1)
2019–	Thailand	13	(3)
- * Club domestic league appearances and goals as of 1 October 2023 ‡ National team caps and goals as of 10 February 2020

Nutwadee Pramnak (Thai: ณัฐวดี ปร่ำนาค, born 9 October 2000) is a Thai footballer who plays as a midfielder for the Thailand women's national team.

== Early life ==
Pramnak was born in Phitsanulok and raised in Bangkok.

== College career ==
Pramnak has attended the University of North Carolina at Pembroke in the United States.

== International goals ==
Scores and results list Thailand's goal tally first.

No.	Date	Venue	Opponent	Score	Result	Competition
1.	17 August 2019	IPE Chonburi Stadium, Chonburi, Thailand	Singapore	7–0	8–0	2019 AFF Women's Championship
2.	19 September 2021	Faisal Al-Husseini International Stadium, Al-Ram, Palestine	Malaysia	2–0	4–0	2022 AFC Women's Asian Cup qualification
3.	10 May 2022	Cẩm Phả Stadium, Cẩm Phả, Vietnam	Singapore	2–0	3–0	2021 Southeast Asian Games
4.	10 July 2022	Biñan Football Stadium, Biñan, Philippines	Malaysia	4–0	4–0	2022 AFF Women's Championship
5.	7 April 2023	Chonburi Stadium, Chonburi, Thailand	Mongolia	1–0	6–0	2024 AFC Women's Olympic Qualifying Tournament
