= Nipawan Panyosuk =

Thai footballer (born 1995)

Personal information
- Full name: Nipawan Panyosuk
- Date of birth: 15 March 1995 (age 31)
- Place of birth: Chiang Mai, Thailand
- Height: 1.63 m (5 ft 4 in)
- Position: Midfielder

Team information
- Current team: Chonburi

Senior career*
Years	Team	Apps	(Gls)
- Chonburi

International career^{‡}
2018–	Thailand	20	(2)
- * Club domestic league appearances and goals ‡ National team caps and goals as of 6 March 2019

Nipawan Panyosuk (Thai: นิภาวรรณ ปัญโญสุข; born 15 March 1995) is a Thai professional footballer who plays as a midfielder for Women's League club Chonburi WFC and captains the Thailand women's national team.

== International goals ==
No.	Date	Venue	Opponent	Score	Result	Competition
1.	4 July 2018	Bumi Sriwijaya Stadium, Palembang, Indonesia	Cambodia	8–0	11–0	2018 AFF Women's Championship
2.	27 January 2021	Mumbai Football Arena, Mumbai, India	Australia	1–2	1–2	2022 AFC Women's Asian Cup
3.	3 May 2023	RSN Stadium, Phnom Penh, Cambodia	Singapore	3–0	4–0	2023 Southeast Asian Games
