= High Performance Training Center (Thailand) =

High Performance Training Center ศูนย์พัฒนาศักยภาพกีฬาฟุตบอล
- Established: 28 November 2017 (official opening)
- Endowment: FIFA
- Address: F16/10 Leabklongtaweewatana Rd, Thawi Watthana District, Bangkok, 10170
- Location: Bangkokthonburi University, Thawi Watthana, Bangkok, Thailand
- Coordinates: 13.769752°N 100.356398°E

High Performance Training Center (Thai: ศูนย์พัฒนาศักยภาพกีฬาฟุตบอล), is the Football Association of Thailand national football centre based in Bangkokthonburi University, Thawi Watthana, Bangkok, Thailand. It was launched by the Football Association of Thailand on 4 April 2017 with the aim of developing Thailand's most promising young footballers. The goal for Football Association of Thailand is to create an ideal football player from the youth level to gain and understanding of how to play in the truth way, have the mind, knowledge, physical basis, the ability in high standard. Football Association of Thailand significant partnerships with three partner organizations include Ekkono Method Soccer Services, Bangkokthonburi University and Police General Hospital to take charge of the technique and create the concept of playing football in the style of Thailand's Way to the youth footballer along with sending coaches to oversee the four youth teams (U14, U16, U19 and U21).

The center was officially opened by Gianni Infantino, president of FIFA and Salman Bin Ibrahim Al-Khalifa, president of AFC on 28 November 2017.

== Facilities ==
The building in High Performance Training Center that located in Bangkokthonburi University has Technical office, Dormitories, Study room, 3 Training grounds, Medical Center, Fitness Center and Swimming pool.

== See also ==
- Football Association of Thailand
- Thailand national football team
- Nong Chok National Football Center
