= Khwanrudi Saengchan =

Thai footballer (born 1991)

Personal information
- Full name: Khwanrudi Saengchan
- Date of birth: 16 May 1991 (age 35)
- Place of birth: Sakhon Nakhon, Thailand
- Height: 1.60 m (5 ft 3 in)
- Position: Defender

Team information
- Current team: BG-Bandit Asia

International career^{‡}
Years	Team	Apps	(Gls)
2014–	Thailand	50	(2)
- ‡ National team caps and goals as of 11 June 2019

Khwanruedi Saengchan (born 16 May 1991) is a Thai international footballer who plays as a defender for BGC-College of Asian Scholars.

== International goals ==
No.	Date	Venue	Opponent	Score	Result	Competition
1.	27 May 2018	Gelora Sriwijaya Stadium, Palembang, Indonesia	Indonesia	2–0	13–0	Friendly
2.	27 May 2018	Gelora Sriwijaya Stadium, Palembang, Indonesia	Indonesia	3–0	13–0	Friendly
3.	23 August 2019	IPE Chonburi Stadium, Chonburi, Thailand	Malaysia	5–0	7–0	2019 AFF Women's Championship
4.	23 August 2019	IPE Chonburi Stadium, Chonburi, Thailand	Malaysia	6–0	7–0	2019 AFF Women's Championship
