= Alisa Rukpinij =

Thai footballer (born 1995)

Personal information
- Full name: Alisa Rukpinij
- Date of birth: 2 February 1995 (age 31)
- Place of birth: Chonburi, Thailand
- Height: 1.58 m (5 ft 2 in)
- Position: Forward

International career^{‡}
Years	Team	Apps	(Gls)
2014–2018	Thailand		(13)
- ‡ National team caps and goals as of 22:35, 17 June 2015 (UTC)

Alisa Rukpinij (Thai: อลิษา รักพินิจ born 2 February 1995) is a Thai international footballer who plays as a forward.

== International goals ==
No.	Date	Venue	Opponent	Score	Result	Competition
1.	17 September 2013	Bogyoke Aung San Stadium, Yangon, Myanmar	Malaysia	6–0	6–0	2013 AFF Women's Championship
2.	3 May 2015	Thống Nhất Stadium, Hồ Chí Minh City, Vietnam	Indonesia	8–0	10–1	2015 AFF Women's Championship
3.	5 May 2015	Thống Nhất Stadium, Hồ Chí Minh City, Vietnam	Laos	1–0	12–0	2015 AFF Women's Championship
4.	5 May 2015	Thống Nhất Stadium, Hồ Chí Minh City, Vietnam	Laos	4–0	12–0	2015 AFF Women's Championship
5.	5 May 2015	Thống Nhất Stadium, Hồ Chí Minh City, Vietnam	Laos	7–0	12–0	2015 AFF Women's Championship
6.	5 May 2015	Thống Nhất Stadium, Hồ Chí Minh City, Vietnam	Laos	8–0	12–0	2015 AFF Women's Championship
7.	5 May 2015	Thống Nhất Stadium, Hồ Chí Minh City, Vietnam	Laos	10–0	12–0	2015 AFF Women's Championship
8.	28 July 2016	Mandalarthiri Stadium, Mandalay, Myanmar	Singapore	2–0	8–0	2016 AFF Women's Championship
9.	5 October 2016	National Stadium, Kaohsiung, Taiwan	Chinese Taipei	1–1	5–2	Friendly
10.	31 May 2018	Bumi Sriwijaya Stadium, Palembang, Indonesia	Indonesia	1–0	3–0	Friendly
11.	4 July 2018	Bumi Sriwijaya Stadium, Palembang, Indonesia	Cambodia	10–0	11–0	2018 AFF Women's Championship
12.	4 July 2022	Biñan Football Stadium, Biñan, Philippines	Indonesia	1–0	4–0	2022 AFF Women's Championship
13.	4 July 2022	Biñan Football Stadium, Biñan, Philippines	Indonesia	4–0	4–0	2022 AFF Women's Championship
14.	12 April 2026	Ratchaburi Stadium, Ratchaburi, Thailand	New Caledonia	4–0	4–0	2026 FIFA Series
