= Kanyanat Chetthabutr =

Thai footballer

Personal information
- Full name: Kanyanat Chetthabutr
- Date of birth: 24 September 1999 (age 27)
- Place of birth: Khon Kaen, Thailand
- Height: 1.64 m (5 ft 5 in)
- Position: Forward

Team information
- Current team: BG Bundit Asia

Senior career*
Years	Team	Apps	(Gls)
- Chonburi
- College of Asian Scholars

International career^{‡}
2018–	Thailand	17	(12)
- * Club domestic league appearances and goals ‡ National team caps and goals as of 10 February 2020

Kanyanat Chetthabutr (Thai: กัญญาณัฐ เชษฐบุตร; born 24 September 1999) is a Thai footballer who plays as a forward for Women's League club BG Bundit Asia.

== International goals ==
Scores and results list Thailand's goal tally first.

No.	Date	Venue	Opponent	Score	Result	Competition
1.	31 May 2018	Bumi Sriwijaya Stadium, Palembang, Indonesia	Indonesia	3–0	3–0	Friendly
2.	6 October 2018	Yongchuan Sports Center, Chongqing, China	Portugal	1–1	1–4	2018 Yongchuan International Tournament
3.	8 December 2019	Rizal Memorial Stadium, Manila, Philippines	Indonesia	1–0	5–1	2019 Southeast Asian Games
4.	8 December 2019	Rizal Memorial Stadium, Manila, Philippines	Indonesia	2–0	5–1	2019 Southeast Asian Games
5.	8 December 2019	Rizal Memorial Stadium, Manila, Philippines	Indonesia	3–0	5–1	2019 Southeast Asian Games
6.	19 September 2021	Faisal Al-Husseini International Stadium, Al-Ram, Palestine	Malaysia	1–0	4–0	2022 AFC Women's Asian Cup qualification
7.	19 September 2021	Faisal Al-Husseini International Stadium, Al-Ram, Palestine	Malaysia	3–0	4–0	2022 AFC Women's Asian Cup qualification
8.	19 September 2021	Faisal Al-Husseini International Stadium, Al-Ram, Palestine	Malaysia	4–0	4–0	2022 AFC Women's Asian Cup qualification
9.	24 January 2022	DY Patil Stadium, Navi Mumbai, India	Indonesia	1–0	4–0	2022 AFC Women's Asian Cup
10.	24 January 2022	DY Patil Stadium, Navi Mumbai, India	Indonesia	2–0	4–0	2022 AFC Women's Asian Cup
11.	24 January 2022	DY Patil Stadium, Navi Mumbai, India	Indonesia	3–0	4–0	2022 AFC Women's Asian Cup
12.	10 May 2022	Cẩm Phả Stadium, Cẩm Phả, Vietnam	Singapore	1–0	3–0	2021 Southeast Asian Games
13.	12 July 2022	Rizal Memorial Stadium, Manila, Philippines	Philippines	1–0	1–0	2022 AFF Women's Championship
14.	15 July 2022	Rizal Memorial Stadium, Manila, Philippines	Myanmar	1–0	2–0	2022 AFF Women's Championship
15.	13 August 2023	Tsing Yi Sports Ground, Tsing Yi, Hong Kong	Hong Kong	3–0	5–0	Friendly
16.	9 December 2025	Chonburi Stadium, Chonburi, Thailand	Singapore	1–0	2–0	2025 SEA Games

== Honours ==
College of Asian Scholars

- AFC Women's Club Championship: 2022 (East)
