= Ploychompoo Somnuek =

Thai footballer (born 2002)

Personal information
- Full name: Ploychompoo Somnuek
- Date of birth: 26 December 2002 (age 23)
- Place of birth: Yasothon, Thailand
- Height: 1.65 m (5 ft 5 in)
- Position: Midfielder

Senior career*
Years	Team	Apps	(Gls)
- Khon Kaen

International career^{‡}
2019	Thailand U19	2	(0)
2020–	Thailand	2	(0)
- * Club domestic league appearances and goals ‡ National team caps and goals as of 10 February 2020

Ploychompoo Somnuek (or Somnonk, Thai: พลอยชมพู สมนึก, born 26 December 2002) is a Thai footballer who plays as a midfielder for the Thailand women's national team.

== International goals ==
No.	Date	Venue	Opponent	Score	Result	Competition
1.	25 January 2020	Mandarthiri Stadium, Mandalay, Myanmar	Myanmar	2–0	2–1	Friendly
2.	15 May 2022	Cẩm Phả Stadium, Cẩm Phả, Vietnam	Laos	3–0	5–0	2021 Southeast Asian Games
3.	18 May 2022	Cẩm Phả Stadium, Cẩm Phả, Vietnam	Philippines	3–0	3–0	2021 Southeast Asian Games
4.	10 July 2022	Biñan Football Stadium, Biñan, Philippines	Malaysia	1–0	4–0	2022 AFF Women's Championship
5.	7 April 2023	Chonburi Stadium, Chonburi, Thailand	Mongolia	3–0	6–0	2024 AFC Women's Olympic Qualifying Tournament
6.	26 June 2025	700th Anniversary Stadium, Chiang Mai, Thailand	Timor-Leste	4–0	4–0	2026 AFC Women's Asian Cup qualification
7.	9 August 2025	Lạch Tray Stadium, Hải Phòng, Vietnam	Cambodia	6–0	7–0	2025 ASEAN Women's Championship
