= 2019 Chinese Women's Super League =

Chinese Women's Super League
- Season: 2019
- Champions: Jiangsu Suning (2nd title)
- AFC Club Championship: Jiangsu Suning
- Top goalscorer: Miao Siwen (8)

The 2019 Chinese Women's Super League season was the league's 5th season in its current incarnation, and the 23rd total season of the women's association football league in China.

The season started on 13 July and concluded on 22 September.

Dalian were the defending champions but ended the season bottom of the league.

Jiangsu Suning won the title, their second since 2009.

== Clubs ==
=== Club changes ===
==== From League One ====
Teams promoted from 2018 Chinese Women's Football League

- Meizhou Huijun

==== To League One ====
Teams relegated to 2019 Chinese Women's Football League

- Hebei China Fortune

==== Name Changes ====
- Shanghai W.F.C. changed their name to Shanghai Shengli F.C. in January 2019.
- Dalian Quanjian F.C. changed their name to Dalian W.F.C.

=== Stadiums and Locations ===
Team	Head coach	City	Stadium	Capacity	2018 season
Dalian		Dalian	Dalian Sports Center Stadium	61,000	1st
Jiangsu Suning		Nanjing	Wutaishan Stadium	18,500	2nd
Changchun Zhuoyue		Changchun	Development Area Stadium	25,000	3rd
Wuhan Jianghan University		Wuhan	Tazi Lake Sports Centre	N/A	4th
Shanghai Shengli		Shanghai	Stadium of Baoshan Campus, Shanghai University	N/A	5th
Beijing BG Phoenix		Beijing	Xiannongtan Stadium	30,000	6th
Henan Huishang		Luoyang	Luoyang Stadium	39,888	7th
Meizhou Huijun		Meizhou	Huitang Stadium	39,888	League One, 1st

== Foreign players ==
Team	Player 1	Player 2	Player 3	Former players
Beijing BG Phoenix	(South Africa) Thembi Kgatlana	(South Africa) Linda Motlhalo		
Changchun Zhuoyue	(Brazil) Chú Santos	(Brazil) Lelê	(Brazil) Rafaelle	
Dalian				(Nigeria) Asisat Oshoala
Meizhou Huijun				
Henan Huishang	(Nigeria) Onome Ebi	(Nigeria) Chinwendu Ihezuo		
Jiangsu Suning	(Ghana) Elizabeth Addo	(Malawi) Tabitha Chawinga		
Shanghai Shengli	(Brazil) Camila	(Nigeria) Francisca Ordega		
Wuhan Jianghan University	(Brazil) Byanca			

== League table ==
Pos	Team	Pld	W	D	L	GF	GA	GD	Pts	Qualification or relegation
1	Jiangsu Suning (C)	14	12	1	1	43	9	+34	37	Qualification for 2019 AFC Women's Club Championship
2	Shanghai Shengli	14	8	5	1	35	11	+24	29	
3	Changchun Zhuoyue	14	7	3	4	26	27	−1	24	
4	Wuhan Jianghan University	14	6	1	7	16	21	−5	19	
5	Beijing BG Phoenix	14	4	4	6	19	20	−1	16	
6	Meizhou Huijun	14	4	2	8	15	36	−21	14	
7	Henan Huishang	14	3	3	8	20	27	−7	12	
8	Dalian	14	1	3	10	6	29	−23	6	Disbanded after season

Source: China Football Association
Rules for classification: 1) Points; 2) Head-to-head points; 3) Head-to-head goal difference; 4) Head-to-head goals scored; 5) Goal difference; 6) Goals scored; 7) Disciplinary points (1 point for each yellow card, 3 points for each red card); 8) Reserve league points; 9) Draw
(C) Champions

== Fixtures and results ==
=== Round 1 ===
13 July 2019	Beijing BG Phoenix	2–3	Jiangsu Suning	Beijing
16:00 (UTC+8)	Kgatlana 14'; Ma Xiaoxu 85'		Ma Jun 45'; Wu Chengshu 55'; Chawinga 78'	Stadium: Xiannongtan Stadium; Attendance: 666

13 July 2019	Shanghai Shengli	5–2	Changchun Dazhong Zhuoyue	Shanghai
16:00 (UTC+8)	Zhao Yingying; Yan Jinjin; Yan Jinjin; Miao Siwen; Zhao Yingying		Ren Guixin; Pang Fengyue	Stadium: Jiading Stadium

13 July 2019	Henan Huishang	2–0	Dalian	Zhengzhou
19:30 (UTC+8)	Lou Jiahui 65'; Ihezuo 68'			Stadium: Zhengzhou University Stadium

14 July 2019	Wuhan Jianghan University	2–1	Meizhou Huijun	Wuhan
19:35 (UTC+8)	Wang Shuang; Lue Yueyun		Gao Qi	Stadium: Tazihu Football Centre

=== Round 2 ===
19 July 2019	Beijing BG Phoenix	1–0	Dalian	Beijing
16:00 (UTC+8)	Kgatlana 27'			Stadium: Xiannongtan Stadium

19 July 2019	Changchun Dazhong Zhuoyue	1–0	Wuhan Jianghan University	Changchun
19:30 (UTC+8)	Ren Guixin			Stadium: Development Area Stadium

19 July 2019	Jiangsu Suning	1–0	Shanghai Shengli	Nanjing
19:30 (UTC+8)	Chawinga 11'			Stadium: Jiangning Football Training Centre

20 July 2019	Meizhou Huijun	0–0	Henan Huishang	Wuhua County
19:30 (UTC+8)				Stadium: Wutaishan County Stadium

=== Round 3 ===
24 July 2019	Changchun Dazhong Zhuoyue	3–0	Meizhou Huijun	Changchun
19:35 (UTC+8)	Pang Fengyue; Pang Fengyue; Pang Fengyue			Stadium: Development Area Stadium

24 July 2019	Henan Huishang	1–3	Beijing BG Phoenix	Zhengzhou
19:35 (UTC+8)	Lou Jiahui		Zhang Xinyue; Ma Xiaoxu; Wang Yan	Stadium: Zhengzhou University Stadium

24 July 2019	Shanghai Shengli	1–1	Dalian	Shanghai
19:35 (UTC+8)	Francisca Ordega		Li Xiang	Stadium: Jiading Stadium

24 July 2019	Wuhan Jianghan University	0–1	Jiangsu Suning	Wuhan
19:35 (UTC+8)			Tabitha Chawinga	Stadium: Tazihu Football Training Centre

=== Round 4 ===
28 July 2019	Beijing BG Phoenix	4–2	Meizhou Huijun	Beijing
16:00 (UTC+8)	Ma Xiaoxu; Ma Xiaoxu; Gu Yasha; Kgatlana		Zhong Xiudong; Li Ying	Stadium: Xiannongtan Stadium

28 July 2019	Dalian	1–3	Wuhan Jianghan University	Dalian
16:00 (UTC+8)				Stadium: Jinshan Stadium

28 July 2019	Henan Huishang	2–6	Shanghai Shengli	Zhengzhou
19:35 (UTC+8)	Onome Ebi; Lou Jiahui		Miao Siwen; Liu Jieru; Yan Jinjin; Huang Yini; Francisca Ordega; Miao Siwen	Stadium: Zhengzhou University Stadium

28 July 2019	Jiangsu Suning	6–1	Changchun Dazhong Zhuoyue	Nanjing
19:35 (UTC+8)	Chawinga; Elizabeth Addo; Tang Jiali; Tang Jiali; Tang Jiali; Xu Yanlu		Ren Guixin	Stadium: Jiangning Football Training Centre

=== Round 5 ===
3 August 2019	Changchun Dazhong Zhuoyue	1–0	Dalian	Changchun
19:35 (UTC+8)	Ren Guixin			Stadium: Development Area Stadium

3 August 2019	Jiangsu Suning	6–1	Meizhou Huijun	Nanjing
19:35 (UTC+8)	Yao Lingwei; Elizabeth Addo; Elizabeth Addo; Tabitha Chawinga; Ni Mengjie; Ni Mengjie		Ouyang Yinyin	Stadium: Jiangning Football Training Centre

3 August 2019	Beijing BG Phoenix	0–2	Shanghai Shengli	Huangshi
19:35 (UTC+8)			Miao Siwen; Liu Jieru	Stadium: Huangshi Olympic Stadium

4 August 2019	Henan Huishang	1–2	Wuhan Jianghan University	Zhengzhou
19:35 (UTC+8)	Onome Ebi		Wang Shuang; Byanca	Stadium: Zhengzhou University Stadium

=== Round 6 ===
9 August 2019	Dalian	0–1	Jiangsu Suning	Dalian
16:00 (UTC+8)	Tabitha Chawinga			Stadium: Jinshan Stadium

9 August 2019	Beijing BG Phoenix	1–2	Wuhan Jianghan University	Huangshi
19:35 (UTC+8)	Ma Xiaoxu (pen.)		Wang Shuang; Byanca	Stadium: Huangshi Olympic Stadium

10 August 2019	Henan Huishang	1–2	Changchun Dazhong Zhuoyue	Zhengzhou
19:35 (UTC+8)	Onome Ebi (pen.)		Pang Fengyue; Ren Guixin	Stadium: Zhengzhou University Stadium

28 August 2019	Shanghai Shengli	5–0	Meizhou Huijun	Shanghai
19:35 (UTC+8)	Zhang Xin; Zhang Xin; Francisca Ordega; Yan Jinjin; Miao Siwen			Stadium: Jiading Stadium

=== Round 7 ===
14 August 2019	Dalian	1–2	Meizhou Huijun	Dalian
16:00 (UTC+8)				Stadium: Jinshan Stadium

14 August 2019	Jiangsu Suning	3–0	Henan Huishang	Nanjing
19:35 (UTC+8)	Yao Lingwei; Tabitha Chawinga; He Wei			Stadium: Jiangning Football Training Centre

14 August 2019	Beijing BG Phoenix	0–0	Changchun Dazhong Zhuoyue	Huangshi
19:35 (UTC+8)				Stadium: Huangshi Olympic Stadium

14 August 2019	Wuhan Jianghan University	0–3	Shanghai Shengli	Wuhan
19:35 (UTC+8)	Camila; Yang Lina; Ordega

=== Round 8 ===
18 August 2019	Dalian	1–5	Henan Huishang	Dalian
16:00 (UTC+8)	O.G.		Ihezuo; Lou Jiahui; O.G. Lou Jiahui; Ihezuo	Stadium: Jinshan Stadium

18 August 2019	Jiangsu Suning	1–0	Beijing BG Phoenix	Nanjing
19:35 (UTC+8)	Ma Jun			Stadium: Jiangning Football Training Centre

19 August 2019	Changchun Dazhong Zhuoyue	1–1	Shanghai Shengli	Changchun
19:35 (UTC+8)	Long Chen		Miao Siwen	Stadium: Development Area Stadium

20 August 2019	Meizhou Huijun	3–2	Wuhan Jianghan University	Wuhua County
19:35 (UTC+8)	Gao Qi; Li Ying; Li Ying		Liu Yanqiu; Byanca

=== Round 9 ===
24 August 2019	Henan Huishang	4–0	Meizhou Huijun	Zhengzhou
16:00 (UTC+8)	Ihezuo; Lou Jiahui; Lou Jiahui; Ihezuo			Stadium: Zhengzhou University Stadium

25 August 2019	Dalian	1–0	Beijing BG Phoenix	Dalian
16:00 (UTC+8)	Wang Shanshan			Stadium: Jinshan Stadium

25 August 2019	Wuhan Jianghan University	0–2	Changchun Dazhong Zhuoyue	Wuhan
19:35 (UTC+8)			Leticia; Wang Xinyang	Stadium: Tazihu Football Training Centre

25 August 2019	Shanghai Shengli	3–1	Jiangsu Suning	Shanghai
19:35 (UTC+8)	Miao Siwen; Miao Siwen; Francisca Ordega		Tang Jiali; Li Mengwen

=== Round 10 ===
31 August 2019	Beijing BG Phoenix	2–1	Henan Huishang	Luoyang
16:00 (UTC+8)	Gu Yasha 3'; Gu Yasha 34'		Han Shuyu

31 August 2019	Jiangsu Suning	1–0	Wuhan Jianghan University	Nanjing
19:35 (UTC+8)	Yang Li			Stadium: Jiangning Football Training Centre

== Relegation play-offs ==
23 November 2019

Dalian	3–1	Hebei China Fortune

== Top scorers ==
As of 24 August 2019

Rank	Player	Club	Goals
1	(China) Miao Siwen	Shanghai Shengli	8
2=	(Malawi) Tabitha Chawinga	Jiangsu Suning	7
2=	(China) Lou Jiahui	Henan Huishang	7
4	(Brazil) Byanca	Wuhan Jianghan University F.C.	6
5=	(Nigeria) Chinwendu Ihezuo	Henan Huishang	5
5=	(China) Pang Fengyue	Changchun Dazhong Zhuoyue	5
5=	(China) Ma Xiaoxu	Beijing BG Phoenix	5
5=	(Nigeria) Francisca Ordega	Shanghai Shengli	5
9=	(China) Ren Guixin	Changchun Dazhong Zhuoyue	4
9=	(China) Tang Jiali	Jiangsu Suning	4
9=	(China) Yan Jinjin	Shanghai Shengli	4
