= 2016 in Chinese football =

Football in China
- Season: 2016

Men's football
- Super League: Guangzhou Evergrande
- League One: Tianjin Quanjian
- League Two: Lijiang Jiayunhao
- Amateur League: Dalian Boyang
- FA Cup: Guangzhou Evergrande
- CFA Super Cup: Guangzhou Evergrande

The 2016 season was the 66th season of competitive association football in China.

== Promotion and relegation ==
League	Promoted to league	Relegated from league
Chinese Super League	Yanbian Funde; Hebei China Fortune	Shanghai Shenxin; Beijing Renhe
China League One	Meizhou Hakka; Dalian Transcendence	Beijing BIT; Jiangxi Liansheng
China League Two	Suzhou Dongwu; Hainan Seamen; Shenzhen Renren; Shenyang Urban	

== National teams ==
=== China national football team ===
==== FIFA ranking ====
Month	Jan	Feb	Mar	Apr	May	Jun	Jul	Aug	Sept	Oct	Nov	Dec
Points	413	365	351	423	423	423	422	445	445	419	423	427
Ranking (World)	82	93	96	81	81	81	81	78	78	84	83	82
Ranking (AFC)	8	11	12	8	8	9	10	8	8	8	8	8

==== Results and fixtures ====
24 March 2016 2018 FIFA World Cup Qual. AFC 2nd round	China	4–0	Maldives	Wuhan, China
19:35 UTC+8	Jiang Ning 3', 84', 90'; Yang Xu 12'	Report (FIFA); Report (AFC)		Stadium: Wuhan Sports Center Stadium; Attendance: 32,618; Referee: Ali Sabah Adday Al-Qaysi (Iraq)

29 March 2016 2018 FIFA World Cup Qual. AFC 2nd round	China	2–0	Qatar	Xi'an, China
20:15 UTC+8	Huang Bowen 57'; Wu Lei 89'	Report (FIFA); Report (AFC)		Stadium: Shaanxi Province Stadium; Attendance: 46,718; Referee: Mohd Amirul Izwan Yaacob (Malaysia)

3 June 2016 Friendly	China	4–2	Trinidad and Tobago	Qinhuangdao, China
19:35 UTC+8	Jiang Ning 2'; Zhang Yuning 30', 65'; Hu Rentian 88'	Report	Plaza 67', 86'	Stadium: Qinhuangdao Olympic Sports Center Stadium; Attendance: 9,752; Referee: Muhammad Taqi Aljaafari Bin Jahari (Singapore)

7 June 2016 Friendly	China	0–1	Kazakhstan	Dalian, China
19:35 UTC+8		Report	Nurgaliev 68'	Stadium: Dalian Sports Center Stadium; Attendance: 31,255; Referee: Chris Beath (Australia)

1 September 2016 2018 FIFA World Cup Qual. AFC 3rd Round	South Korea	3–2	China	Seoul, South Korea
20:00 UTC+9	Zheng Zhi 20' (o.g.); Lee Chung-yong 62'; Koo Ja-cheol 66'	Report (FIFA)	Yu Hai 73'; Hao Junmin 76'	Stadium: Seoul World Cup Stadium; Attendance: 51,238; Referee: Mohammed Abdulla Hassan Mohamed (United Arab Emirates)

6 September 2016 2018 FIFA World Cup Qual. AFC 3rd Round	China	0–0	Iran	Shenyang, China
19:35 UTC+8		Report (FIFA); Report (AFC)		Stadium: Shenyang Olympic Sports Center Stadium; Attendance: 35,776; Referee: Adham Makhadmeh (Jordan)

6 October 2016 2018 FIFA World Cup Qual. AFC 3rd Round	China	0–1	Syria	Xi'an, China
19:35 UTC+8		Report (FIFA); Report (AFC)	Al Mawas 54'	Stadium: Shaanxi Province Stadium; Attendance: 37,368; Referee: Muhammad Taqi (Singapore)

11 October 2016 2018 FIFA World Cup Qual. AFC 3rd Round	Uzbekistan	2–0	China	Tashkent, Uzbekistan
18:00 UTC+5	Bikmaev 50'; Shukurov 85'	Report (FIFA); Report (AFC)		Stadium: Bunyodkor Stadium; Attendance: 21,503; Referee: Hettikamkanamge Perera (Sri Lanka)

15 November 2016 2018 FIFA World Cup Qual. AFC 3rd Round	China	0–0	Qatar	Kunming, China
19:35 UTC+8		Report (FIFA); Report (AFC)		Stadium: Tuodong Stadium; Attendance: 32,763; Referee: Mohanad Qasim Eesee Sarray (Iraq)

=== China women's national football team ===
==== FIFA ranking ====
Month	Mar	Jun	Sept	Dec
Points	1918	1914	1892	1892
Ranking (World)	12	12	13	13
Ranking (AFC)	4	4	4	4

==== Results and fixtures ====
21 January 2016 2016 Four Nations Tournament	China	0–0	Mexico	Shenzhen, China
16:00 UTC+8				Stadium: Shenzhen Universiade Sports Centre; Referee: Qin Liang (China)

23 January 2016 2016 Four Nations Tournament	China	8–0	Vietnam	Shenzhen, China
19:30 UTC+8	Zhang Rui 12', 53'; Zhao Xue 36'; Ma Xiaoxu 50', 89'; Wang Shanshan 65', 80'; Lou Jiahui 70'			Stadium: Shenzhen Universiade Sports Centre; Referee: Wang Jia (China)

26 January 2016 2016 Four Nations Tournament	China	2–0	South Korea	Shenzhen, China
16:00 UTC+8	Ma Xiaoxu 11'; Wang Shanshan 77'			Stadium: Shenzhen Universiade Sports Centre; Referee: Li Juan (China)

29 February 2016 2016 Summer Olympics qualification	China	2–0	Vietnam	Osaka, Japan
16:35 UTC+9	Gu Yasha 57'; Zhang Rui 63' (pen.)	Report		Stadium: Nagai Stadium; Attendance: 369; Referee: Lucila Montes (Mexico)

2 March 2016 2016 Summer Olympics qualification	China	1–1	North Korea	Osaka, Japan
19:35 UTC+9	Wang Shuang 90+3' (pen.)	Report	Ra Un-sim 38'	Stadium: Nagai Stadium; Attendance: 463; Referee: Rita Gani (Malaysia)

4 March 2016 2016 Summer Olympics qualification	Japan	1–2	China	Osaka, Japan
19:39 UTC+9	Yokoyama 65'	Report	Zhang Rui 14'; Gu Yasha 58'	Stadium: Kincho Stadium; Attendance: 6,959; Referee: Stéphanie Frappart (France)

7 March 2016 2016 Summer Olympics qualification	China	1–0	South Korea	Osaka, Japan
16:35 UTC+9	Wang Shanshan 43'	Report		Stadium: Nagai Stadium; Attendance: 451; Referee: Carina Vitulano (Italy)

9 March 2016 2016 Summer Olympics qualification	China	1–1	Australia	Osaka, Japan
19:39 UTC+9	Ma Xiaoxu 16'	Report	Van Egmond 85'	Stadium: Nagai Stadium; Attendance: 250; Referee: Stéphanie Frappart (France)

8 April 2016 Friendly	China	2–1	Costa Rica	Shenzhen, China
19:35 UTC+8	Ma Xiaoxu 39'; Zhao Xue 67'		Granados 65'	Stadium: Shenzhen Universiade Sports Centre; Referee: Wang Jia (China)

11 April 2016 Friendly	China	1–1	Costa Rica	Qujing, China
19:35 UTC+8	Wang Shuang 90+2' (pen.)		Cruz 47' (pen.)	Stadium: Qujing Cultural and Sports Centre Stadium; Referee: He Xiaohu (China)

2 June 2016 Friendly	China	6–0	Thailand	Kunshan, China
19:35 UTC+8	Ma Xiaoxu 13'; Zhang Rui 19', 45+2'; Ren Guixin 47'; Yang Li 86'; Zhao Xue 90+3'			Stadium: Kunshan Stadium; Referee: Qin Liang (China)

5 June 2016 Friendly	China	3–0	Thailand	Changzhou, China
19:35 UTC+8	Yang Li 17'; Yang Man 54'; Ren Guixin 78'			Stadium: Changzhou Olympic Sports Center; Referee: Qin Liang (China)

16 July 2016 Friendly	France	3–0	China	Paris, France
21:00 UTC+2	Diani 15'; Renard 29'; Lavogez 82' (pen.)			Stadium: Stade Sébastien Charléty; Referee: Désirée Grundbacher (Switzerland)

20 July 2016 Friendly	China	0–1	Canada	Paris, France
19:00 UTC+2			Fleming 6'	Stadium: Stade Sébastien Charléty; Referee: Hannelore Onsea (Belgium)

29 July 2016 Friendly	China	3–0	Zimbabwe	São Paulo, Brazil
16:00 UTC−3	Wang Shanshan 5'; Yang Li 12', 52'			Stadium: Esporte Clube Pinheiros Training Field

3 August 2016 2016 Summer Olympics	Brazil	3–0	China	Rio de Janeiro, Brazil
16:00 UTC−3	Monica 36'; Andressa 59'; Cristiane 90'	Report (Rio2016); Report (FIFA)		Stadium: Estádio Olímpico João Havelange; Attendance: 27,618; Referee: Carol Chenard (Canada)

6 August 2016 2016 Summer Olympics	China	2–0	South Africa	Rio de Janeiro, Brazil
19:00 UTC−3	Gu Yasha 45+1'; Tan Ruyin 87'	Report (Rio2016); Report (FIFA)		Stadium: Estádio Olímpico João Havelange; Attendance: 25,000; Referee: Esther Staubli (Switzerland)

9 August 2016 2016 Summer Olympics	China	0–0	Sweden	Brasília, Brazil
22:00 UTC−3		Report (Rio2016); Report (FIFA)		Stadium: Estádio Nacional Mané Garrincha; Attendance: 7,648; Referee: Olga Miranda (Paraguay)

12 August 2016 2016 Summer Olympics	China	0–1	Germany	Salvador, Brazil
16:00 UTC−3		Report (Rio2016); Report (FIFA)	Behringer 76'	Stadium: Itaipava Arena Fonte Nova; Attendance: 9,642; Referee: Kateryna Monzul (Ukraine)

20 October 2016 2016 Yongchuan International Tournament	China	2–2	Iceland	Chongqing, China
19:35 UTC+8	Wang Shuang 53'; Yang Li 82'		Friðriksdóttir 6'; Ásbjörnsdóttir 86'	Stadium: Yongchuan Sports Center; Referee: Qin Liang (China)

22 October 2016 2016 Yongchuan International Tournament	China	4–1	Uzbekistan	Chongqing, China
16:00 UTC+8	Yang Li 13', 53', 74'; Wang Shuang 80'		Narbekova 6'	Stadium: Yongchuan Sports Center; Referee: Law Bik Chi (Hong Kong)

24 October 2016 2016 Yongchuan International Tournament	China	1–0	Denmark	Chongqing, China
19:35 UTC+8	Ren Guixin 47'			Stadium: Yongchuan Sports Center; Referee: Qin Liang (China)

== AFC competitions ==
=== 2016 AFC Champions League ===
==== Qualifying play-off ====
===== Preliminary round 2 =====
Team 1	Score	Team 2
Shandong Luneng (China)	6–0	(India) Mohun Bagan

===== Play-off round =====
Team 1	Score	Team 2
Shanghai SIPG (China)	3–0	(Thailand) Muangthong United

==== Group stage ====
===== Group E =====
Pos	Team	Pld	W	D	L	GF	GA	GD	Pts	Qualification	JHM	TOK	JIA	BBD
1	(South Korea) Jeonbuk Hyundai Motors	6	3	1	2	13	9	+4	10	Advance to knockout stage	—	2–1	2–2	2–0
2	(Japan) FC Tokyo	6	3	1	2	8	8	0	10	Advance to knockout stage	0–3	—	0–0	3–1
3	(China) Jiangsu Suning	6	2	3	1	10	7	+3	9		3–2	1–2	—	3–0
4	(Vietnam) Becamex Binh Duong	6	1	1	4	6	13	−7	4		3–2	1–2	1–1	—

Source: AFC

===== Group F =====
Pos	Team	Pld	W	D	L	GF	GA	GD	Pts	Qualification	SEO	SHD	HIR	BUR
1	(South Korea) FC Seoul	6	4	1	1	17	5	+12	13	Advance to knockout stage	—	0–0	4–1	2–1
2	(China) Shandong Luneng	6	3	2	1	7	5	+2	11	Advance to knockout stage	1–4	—	1–0	3–0
3	(Japan) Sanfrecce Hiroshima	6	3	0	3	9	8	+1	9		2–1	1–2	—	3–0
4	(Thailand) Buriram United	6	0	1	5	1	16	−15	1		0–6	0–0	0–2	—

Source: AFC

===== Group G =====
Pos	Team	Pld	W	D	L	GF	GA	GD	Pts	Qualification	SSI	MEL	SSB	GAM
1	(China) Shanghai SIPG	6	4	0	2	10	8	+2	12	Advance to knockout stage	—	3–1	2–1	2–1
2	(Australia) Melbourne Victory	6	2	3	1	7	7	0	9 (Note: Head-to-head points: Melbourne Victory 2, Suwon Samsung Bluewings 2. Head-to-head away goal: Melbourne Victory 1, Suwon Samsung Bluewings 0)	Advance to knockout stage	2–1	—	0–0	2–1
3	(South Korea) Suwon Samsung Bluewings	6	2	3	1	7	4	+3	9		3–0	1–1	—	0–0
4	(Japan) Gamba Osaka	6	0	2	4	4	9	−5	2		0–2	1–1	1–2	—

Source: AFC

===== Group H =====
Pos	Team	Pld	W	D	L	GF	GA	GD	Pts	Qualification	SYD	URA	GZE	POH
1	(Australia) Sydney FC	6	3	1	2	4	4	0	10	Advance to knockout stage	—	0–0	2–1	1–0
2	(Japan) Urawa Red Diamonds	6	2	3	1	6	4	+2	9	Advance to knockout stage	2–0	—	1–0	1–1
3	(China) Guangzhou Evergrande	6	2	2	2	6	5	+1	8		1–0	2–2	—	0–0
4	(South Korea) Pohang Steelers	6	1	2	3	2	5	−3	5		0–1	1–0	0–2	—

Source: AFC

==== Knockout stage ====
===== Round of 16 =====
Team 1	Agg.	Team 2	1st leg	2nd leg
FC Tokyo (Japan)	2–2 (a)	(China) Shanghai SIPG	2–1	0–1
Shandong Luneng (China)	3–3 (a)	(Australia) Sydney FC	1–1	2–2

===== Quarter-finals =====
Team 1	Agg.	Team 2	1st leg	2nd leg
Shanghai SIPG (China)	0–5	(South Korea) Jeonbuk Hyundai Motors	0–0	0–5
FC Seoul (South Korea)	4–2	(China) Shandong Luneng	3–1	1–1

== Men's Football ==
=== League season ===
==== Chinese Super League ====
Pos	Team	Pld	W	D	L	GF	GA	GD	Pts	Qualification or relegation
1	Guangzhou Evergrande Taobao (C)	30	19	7	4	62	19	+43	64	Qualification to Champions League group stage
2	Jiangsu Suning	30	17	6	7	53	33	+20	57	Qualification to Champions League group stage
3	Shanghai SIPG	30	14	10	6	56	32	+24	52	Qualification to Champions League play-off round
4	Shanghai Greenland Shenhua (Note: Shanghai Greenland Shenhua qualified for the 2017 AFC Champions League qualifying play-offs round as Guangzhou Evergrande Taobao and Jiangsu Suning are 2016 Chinese FA Cup finalists.)	30	12	12	6	46	31	+15	48	Qualification to Champions League play-off round
5	Beijing Guoan	30	11	10	9	34	26	+8	43	
6	Guangzhou R&F	30	11	7	12	47	50	−3	40	
7	Hebei China Fortune	30	11	7	12	34	38	−4	40	
8	Chongqing Lifan	30	9	10	11	43	50	−7	37	
9	Yanbian Funde	30	10	7	13	39	41	−2	37	
10	Tianjin TEDA	30	9	9	12	38	50	−12	36	
11	Liaoning Whowin	30	9	9	12	38	47	−9	36	
12	Changchun Yatai	30	10	5	15	30	44	−14	35	
13	Henan Jianye	30	10	5	15	26	44	−18	35	
14	Shandong Luneng Taishan	30	9	7	14	38	45	−7	34	
15	Hangzhou Greentown (R)	30	8	8	14	28	37	−9	32	Relegation to League One
16	Shijiazhuang Ever Bright (R)	30	7	9	14	28	53	−25	30	Relegation to League One

Source: Sina Sports
Rules for classification: 1) Points; 2) Head-to-head points; 3) Head-to-head goal difference; 4) Head-to-head goals scored; 5) Reserve league points; 6) Goal difference; 7) Goals scored; 8) Disciplinary points (1 point for each yellow card, 3 points for each red card)
(C) Champions; (R) Relegated

==== China League One ====
Pos	Team	Pld	W	D	L	GF	GA	GD	Pts	Promotion, qualification or relegation
1	Tianjin Quanjian (C, P)	30	18	5	7	61	27	+34	59 (Note: Head-to-head points: Tianjin Quanjian 9 pts, Guizhou Hengfeng Zhicheng 6 pts, Qingdao Huanghai 3 pts.)	Promotion to Super League
2	Guizhou Hengfeng Zhicheng (P)	30	18	5	7	48	27	+21	59	Promotion to Super League
3	Qingdao Huanghai	30	19	2	9	52	42	+10	59	
4	Beijing Renhe	30	15	4	11	49	35	+14	49	
5	Dalian Yifang	30	14	3	13	43	44	−1	45	
6	Wuhan Zall	30	12	7	11	31	33	−2	43	
7	Nei Mongol Zhongyou	30	12	5	13	37	35	+2	41 (Note: Head-to-head results: Nei Mongol 1–0 Beijing Enterprises Group, Beijing Enterprises Group 0–0 Nei Mongol.)	
8	Beijing Enterprises Group	30	11	8	11	40	38	+2	41	
9	Shenzhen F.C.	30	11	7	12	36	43	−7	40 (Note: Head-to-head results: Shenzhen 4–2 Shanghai Shenxin, Shanghai Shenxin 1–1 Shenzhen.)	
10	Shanghai Shenxin	30	12	4	14	54	48	+6	40	
11	Xinjiang Tianshan Leopard	30	11	6	13	31	36	−5	39 (Note: Head-to-head results: Xinjiang 1–0 Meizhou, Meizhou 1–1 Xinjiang.)	
12	Meizhou Hakka	30	11	6	13	48	50	−2	39	
13	Zhejiang Yiteng	30	11	5	14	39	49	−10	38 (Note: Head-to-head results: Zhejiang 1–0 Dalian Transcendence, Dalian Transcendence 2–2 Zhejiang.)	
14	Dalian Transcendence	30	10	8	12	32	36	−4	38	
15	Qingdao Jonoon (R)	30	8	9	13	30	43	−13	33	Relegation to League Two
16	Hunan Billows (R)	30	2	6	22	16	61	−45	12	Relegation to League Two

Updated to match(es) played on 22 October 2016. Source: sports.sina.com
Rules for classification: 1) Points; 2) Head-to-head points; 3) Head-to-head goal difference; 4) Head-to-head goals scored; 5) Goal difference; 6) Goals scored; 7) Disciplinary points (1 point for each yellow card, 3 points for each red card)
(C) Champions; (P) Promoted; (R) Relegated

==== China League Two ====
===== Overall table =====
Pos	Team	Pld	W	D	L	GF	GA	GD	Pts	Promotion or relegation
1	Lijiang Jiayunhao (C, P)	23	13	5	5	32	21	+11	44 (Note: Lijiang 2:0 Baoding)	League One
2	Baoding Yingli ETS (P)	23	11	6	6	34	22	+12	39	League One
3	Jiangxi Liansheng	23	10	11	2	31	20	+11	41 (Note: Jiangxi 3:2 Sichuan)	
4	Sichuan Longfor	23	9	9	5	27	20	+7	36	
5	Yinchuan Helanshan	20	12	6	2	32	13	+19	42 (Note: Yinchuan, 1pts, GD=-1; Elite, 1pts, GD=-2, Pts=38; Meixian, 1pts, GD=-2, Pts=34; Urban, 0pts)	
6	Hebei Elite	20	11	6	3	33	18	+15	39	
7	Meizhou Meixian Hakka	20	8	11	1	26	17	+9	35	
8	Shenyang Urban	20	10	3	7	30	19	+11	33	
9	Chengdu Qbao	20	8	6	6	24	19	+5	30 (Note: Chengdu 2:2 Heilongjiang; Heilongjiang 1:2 Chengdu)	
10	Heilongjiang Lava Spring	20	9	4	7	28	24	+4	31	
11	Shenzhen Renren	20	7	5	8	21	16	+5	26 (Note: Baotou 0:1 Renren; Renren 6:1 Baotou)	
12	Baotou Nanjiao	20	5	4	11	23	36	−13	19	
13	Tianjin Huochetou	20	5	5	10	22	26	−4	20 (Note: Dongwu 1:1 Huochetou; Huochetou 5:1 Dongwu)	Disbanded after season
14	Suzhou Dongwu	20	4	7	9	12	20	−8	19 (Note: TJL)	
15	Beijing BIT	20	5	7	8	19	29	−10	22 (Note: BIT 2:1 Nantong; Nantong 0:1 BIT)	
16	Nantong Zhiyun	20	3	9	8	14	22	−8	18	
17	Hainan Boying & Seamen	20	6	5	9	20	25	−5	23 (Note: Yancheng 3:5 Hainan; Hainan 3:0 Yancheng)	
18	Jiangsu Yancheng Dingli	20	2	7	11	16	34	−18	13	
19	Shenyang Dongjin	20	2	5	13	18	43	−25	11 (Note: JuJu Sports 2:1 Dongjin; Dongjin 3:0 JuJu Sports)	
20	Shanghai JuJu Sports	20	3	4	13	17	36	−19	13	

(C) Champions; (P) Promoted

===== North Group =====
Pos	Team	Pld	W	D	L	GF	GA	GD	Pts	Qualification or Qualifying
1	Yinchuan Helanshan (Q)	18	12	5	1	30	10	+20	41	Qualification to Play-offs
2	Hebei Elite (Q)	18	11	5	2	32	15	+17	38	Qualification to Play-offs
3	Shenyang Urban (Q)	18	10	3	5	28	15	+13	33	Qualification to Play-offs
4	Baoding Yingli ETS (Q, P)	18	9	5	4	28	16	+12	32	Qualification to Play-offs
5	Heilongjiang Lava Spring	18	9	3	6	25	20	+5	30	Qualifying to Play-offs
6	Baotou Nanjiao	18	5	4	9	22	29	−7	19	Qualifying to Play-offs
7	Tianjin Huochetou	18	4	4	10	16	24	−8	16	Qualifying to Play-offs
8	Beijing BIT	18	3	7	8	16	28	−12	16	Qualifying to Play-offs
9	Jiangsu Yancheng Dingli	18	2	7	9	13	26	−13	13	Qualifying to Play-offs
10	Shenyang Dongjin	18	1	5	12	14	41	−27	8	Qualifying to Play-offs

Updated to match(es) played on Aug 27, 2016. Source: fa.org.cn
Rules for classification: 1) Points; 2) Head-to-head points; 3) Head-to-head goal difference; 4) Head-to-head goals scored; 5) Goal difference; 6) Goals scored; 7) Disciplinary points (1 point for each yellow card, 3 points for each red card)
(P) Promoted; (Q) Qualified for the phase indicated

===== South Group =====
Pos	Team	Pld	W	D	L	GF	GA	GD	Pts	Qualification or Qualifying
1	Meizhou Meixian Hakka (Q)	18	8	10	0	25	14	+11	34	Qualification to Play-offs
2	Lijiang Jiayunhao (Q, C, P)	18	10	4	4	26	18	+8	34	Qualification to Play-offs
3	Jiangxi Liansheng (Q)	18	7	10	1	22	14	+8	31	Qualification to Play-offs
4	Sichuan Longfor (Q)	18	7	8	3	21	14	+7	29	Qualification to Play-offs
5	Chengdu Qbao	18	7	5	6	20	16	+4	26	Qualifying to Play-offs
6	Shenzhen Renren	18	5	5	8	14	15	−1	20	Qualifying to Play-offs
7	Suzhou Dongwu	18	4	6	8	10	14	−4	18	Qualifying to Play-offs
8	Nantong Zhiyun	18	3	9	6	13	19	−6	18	Qualifying to Play-offs
9	Hainan Boying & Seamen	18	4	5	9	12	22	−10	17	Qualifying to Play-offs
10	Shanghai JuJu Sports	18	2	4	12	15	32	−17	10	Qualifying to Play-offs

Updated to match(es) played on Aug 27, 2016. Source: fa.org.cn
Rules for classification: 1) Points; 2) Head-to-head points; 3) Head-to-head goal difference; 4) Head-to-head goals scored; 5) Goal difference; 6) Goals scored; 7) Disciplinary points (1 point for each yellow card, 3 points for each red card)
(C) Champions; (P) Promoted; (Q) Qualified for the phase indicated

===== Play-offs =====
====== Nineteenth place match ======
Team 1	Agg.	Team 2	1st leg	2nd leg
Shanghai JuJu Sports	2–4	Shenyang Dongjin	2–1	0–3

====== Seventeenth Place Match ======
Team 1	Agg.	Team 2	1st leg	2nd leg
Jiangsu Yancheng Dingli	3–8	Hainan Seamen	3–5	0–3

====== Fifteenth Place Match ======
Team 1	Agg.	Team 2	1st leg	2nd leg
Beijing BIT	3–1	Nantong Zhiyun	2–1	1–0

====== Thirteenth Place Match ======
Team 1	Agg.	Team 2	1st leg	2nd leg
Suzhou Dongwu	2–6	Tianjin Huochetou	1–1	1–5

====== Eleventh Place Match ======
Team 1	Agg.	Team 2	1st leg	2nd leg
Baotou Nanjiao	1–7	Shenzhen Renren	0–1	1–6

====== Nineteenth place match ======
Team 1	Agg.	Team 2	1st leg	2nd leg
Chengdu Qbao	4–3	Heilongjiang Lava Spring	2–2	2–1

====== Quarter-finals ======
Team 1	Agg.	Team 2	1st leg	2nd leg
Sichuan Longfor	3–2	Yinchuan Helanshan	2–1	1–1
Shenyang Urban	2–4	Lijiang Jiayunhao	0–1	2–3
Baoding Yingli ETS	3–1	Meixian Hakka	1–1	2–0
Jiangxi Liansheng	3–1	Hebei Elite	2–0	1–1

====== Semi-finals ======
Team 1	Agg.	Team 2	1st leg	2nd leg
Lijiang Jiayunhao	1–1 (2–1 p)	Sichuan Longfor	0–1	1–0 (a.e.t.)
Jiangxi Liansheng	3–3 (a)	Baoding Yingli ETS	3–1	0–2

====== Third-Place Match ======
22 October 2016
15:00 UTC+8

Jiangxi Liansheng	3–2	Sichuan Longfor
Zhu Yifan 34', 87'; Fan Zhiqiang 56'		Zhu Chaoqing 20'; Liu Yaoxin 72'

Jiujiang Stadium, Jiujiang
Referee: Gu Chunhan

====== Final ======
23 October 2016
15:00 UTC+8

Lijiang Jiayunhao	2–0	Baoding Yingli ETS
Yang Zi 14'; Men Yang 87'

Lijiang Sports Development Center, Lijiang
Referee: Lin Jun

=== Cup competitions ===
==== Chinese FA Cup ====
===== Final =====
First leg

20 November 2016
19:35 UTC+8

Guangzhou Evergrande Taobao	1–1	Jiangsu Suning
Goulart 9'		Teixeira 64'

Tianhe Stadium, Guangzhou
Attendance: 48,562
Referee: Huang Yejun

Second leg

27 November 2016
19:00 UTC+8

Jiangsu Suning	2–2	Guangzhou Evergrande Taobao
Martínez 7', 73'		Paulinho 45+2'; Huang Bowen 81'

Nanjing Olympic Sports Centre, Nanjing
Attendance: 58,331
Referee: Jansen Foo (Singapore)

3–3 on aggregate. Guangzhou Evergrande Taobao won on away goals.

==== Chinese FA Super Cup ====
27 February 2016
19:35 UTC+8

Guangzhou Evergrande Taobao	2–0	Jiangsu Suning
Goulart 14', 39'

Olympic Sports Center, Chongqing
Attendance: 50,380
Referee: Tan Hai

== Women's Football ==
=== League season ===
==== China Women's Super League ====
League table

Pos	Team	Pld	W	D	L	GF	GA	GD	Pts	Relegation
1	Dalian Quanjian (C)	14	9	4	1	29	7	+22	31	
2	Shanghai GTJA Yung Park	14	9	3	2	26	11	+15	30	
3	Changchun Rural Commercial Bank	14	8	3	3	25	9	+16	27	
4	Shandong Elite Sports Stylish	14	5	3	6	14	17	−3	18	
5	Tianjin Huisen	14	5	3	6	17	25	−8	18	
6	Beijing Enterprise Holding	14	5	2	7	19	24	−5	17	
7	Jiangsu Suning	14	4	4	6	12	16	−4	16	Super League Relegation Playoffs
8	PLA (R)	14	0	0	14	6	39	−33	0	Relegated to League One

==== China Women's League One ====
League table

Pos	Team	Pld	W	D	L	GF	GA	GD	Pts	Promotion
1	Hebei China Fortune (C)(P)	14	12	2	0	45	3	+42	38	Promoted to Super League
2	Zhejiang Lander	14	10	3	1	33	6	+27	33	Super League Relegation Playoffs
3	Henan Huishang	14	8	2	4	26	13	+13	26	
4	Sichuan WFC	14	7	1	6	14	14	0	22	
5	Wuhan Jianghan University	14	5	1	8	13	20	−7	16	
6	Shaanxi WFC	14	4	3	7	8	17	−9	15	
7	Guangdong Suoka	14	4	0	10	14	19	−5	12	
8	Nei Mongol Hengjun Beilian	14	0	0	14	2	63	−61	0	

==== China Women's Super League Relegation Playoffs ====
10 November 2016
15:00 UTC+8

Jiangsu Suning	2–1	Zhejiang Lander
Yang Li 82', 90+'		Zhao Tong 15'

Huizhou Olympic Stadium, Huizhou

=== Cup competitions ===
==== Chinese Women's Football Championship ====
===== Final =====
28 August 2016
20:15 UTC+8

Tianjin Huisen	2–0	Dalian Quanjian
Lei Jiahui 52'; Wang Shanshan 79'

Tazihu Sports Center, Wuhan

==== Chinese FA Women's Cup ====
===== Final =====
13 August 2016
19:00 UTC+8

Shanghai GTJA Yung Park	4–2	Jiangsu Suning
Zhang Jieli 20'; Zhang Xin 74'; Yan Jinjin 85', 89'		Xu Wenhong 78'; Ma Jun 87'

Weifang Sports Center Stadium, Weifang

==== Chinese FA Women's Super Cup ====
12 November 2016
16:00 UTC+8

Dalian Quanjian	3–3	Tianjin Huisen
Fabiana 39'; Ma Xiaoxu 48', 80'		Lou Jiahui 17', 33'; Lei Jiahui 64'
Penalties
Ma Xiaoxu (penalty missed); Li Dongna (penalty scored); Wang Shuang (penalty scored); Debinha (penalty scored); Li Wen (penalty missed)	3–4	(penalty scored) Feng Yadi; (penalty missed) Li Xiang; (penalty scored) Han Peng; (penalty scored) Lou Jiahui; (penalty scored) Liu Yanmei

Huizhou Olympic Stadium, Huizhou
Referee: Peng Xin

== Scandals ==
=== Wuhan Hongxing–Jiangsu Suning brawl ===
On 11 May 2016, an on-field brawl occurred in the third-round game of FA Cup between amateur club Wuhan Hongxing and first tier club Jiangsu Suning. Jiangsu's striker Ge Wei scored in the 7th minute of stoppage time as Jiangsu edged Wuhan Hongxing 1–0 and advanced to the next round. Players and staff of Wuhan Hongxing lost control and attacked their counterparts following the final whistle. Jiangsu's Xie Pengfei was hit onto the ground by several Wuhan players, while scorer Ge Wei was injured on his rib; many other Jiangsu's players also suffered injuries in the melee. Some reporters from Jiangsu were also assaulted in the incident. Jiangsu's staff Wu Bo, who was recording the match, was beaten up by a group of unidentified people.

Jiangsu Suning left Wuhan on a high-speed train immediately after the match. The officials of Wuhan Hongxing condemned the brawl and vowed to punish the players involved later that day. They also emphasized that the cause of the brawl could not ascribed to Wuhan only as they believed the goal celebration of Jiangsu was a deliberate provocation. On 12 May 2016, Wuhan Hongxing issued an apology to Jiangsu and announced that five players who were involved the brawl had been sacked by the club. However, Wuhan was exposed to use ineligible players in the match on the same day.

On 20 May 2016, the Chinese Football Association published the survey results and punishments. Jiangsu was awarded a 3–0 win. Wuhan Hongxing Bairun F.C. was fined 200,000 RMB and banned from all future matches organised by the Chinese Football Association. Six players and two staff of Wuhan received a life ban from football, four players of Wuhan received a 36-month ban from football and ten players of Wuhan received a 24-month ban from football.
