= 2022 Chinese Women's Football Championship =

Tournament details
- Country: China
- Dates: 12–25 March 2022
- Teams: 19

Final positions
- Champions: Changchun Dazhong Zhuoyue
- Runners-up: Beijing

The 2022 Chinese Women's Football Championship (Chinese: 2022年中国足球协会全国女子足球锦标赛) was the 31st edition of the Chinese Women's Football Championship. It was held from 12 to 25 March 2022 at Haigeng Football Base in Kunming.

== First round ==
=== Group A ===
Pos	Team	Pld	W	D	L	GF	GA	GD	Pts	Qualification
1	Shandong Sports Lottery	3	2	1	0	7	2	+5	7	Qualification to the Quarter-finals
2	Yongchuan Chashan Zhuhai	3	2	0	1	5	4	+1	6	Qualification to the Quarter-finals
3	Hebei	3	0	2	1	1	3	−2	2	Qualification to the 9th–16th-place play-offs
4	Hainan Qiongzhong	3	0	1	2	2	6	−4	1	Qualification to the 9th–16th-place play-offs

Source: CFA
Rules for classification: 1) Points; 2) Head-to-head points; 3) Head-to-head goal difference; 4) Head-to-head goals scored.

12 March 2021	Shandong Sports Lottery	3–1	Hainan Qiongzhong	Haigeng Football Base Field 2, Kunming
10:00

12 March 2021	Hebei	0–2	Yongchuan Chashan Zhuhai	Haigeng Football Base Field 5, Kunming
10:00

14 March 2021	Yongchuan Chashan Zhuhai	0–3	Shandong Sports Lottery	Haigeng Football Base Field 14, Kunming
16:00

14 March 2021	Hainan Qiongzhong	0–0	Hebei	Haigeng Football Base Field 16, Kunming
16:00

16 March 2021	Shandong Sports Lottery	1–1	Hebei	Haigeng Football Base Field 2, Kunming
10:00

16 March 2021	Yongchuan Chashan Zhuhai	3–1	Hainan Qiongzhong	Haigeng Football Base Field 5, Kunming
10:00

=== Group B ===
Pos	Team	Pld	W	D	L	GF	GA	GD	Pts	Qualification
1	Sichuan	3	1	2	0	6	2	+4	5	Qualification to the Quarter-finals
2	Shaanxi Chang'an Athletic	3	1	2	0	4	3	+1	5	Qualification to the 9th–16th-place play-offs
3	Jiangsu	3	1	2	0	1	0	+1	5	Qualification to the 9th–16th-place play-offs
4	Wuhan Jianghan University	3	0	0	3	1	7	−6	0	

Source: CFA
Rules for classification: 1) Points; 2) Head-to-head points; 3) Head-to-head goal difference; 4) Head-to-head goals scored.

12 March 2021	Sichuan	0–0	Jiangsu	Haigeng Football Base Field 2, Kunming
16:00

12 March 2021	Wuhan Jianghan University	1–2	Shaanxi Chang'an Athletic	Haigeng Football Base Field 5, Kunming
16:00

14 March 2021	Shaanxi Chang'an Athletic	2–2	Sichuan	Haigeng Football Base Field 2, Kunming
10:00

14 March 2021	Jiangsu	1–0	Wuhan Jianghan University	Haigeng Football Base Field 5, Kunming
10:00

16 March 2021	Sichuan	4–0	Wuhan Jianghan University	Haigeng Football Base Field 14, Kunming
16:00

16 March 2021	Shaanxi Chang'an Athletic	0–0	Jiangsu	Haigeng Football Base Field 16, Kunming
16:00

=== Group C ===
Pos	Team	Pld	W	D	L	GF	GA	GD	Pts	Qualification
1	Shanghai Shengli	2	1	1	0	2	0	+2	4	Qualification to the Quarter-finals
2	Beijing	2	1	1	0	2	1	+1	4	Qualification to the Quarter-finals
3	Henan Jianye	2	0	0	2	1	4	−3	0	Qualification to the 9th–16th-place play-offs

Source: CFA
Rules for classification: 1) Points; 2) Head-to-head points; 3) Head-to-head goal difference; 4) Head-to-head goals scored.

12 March 2021	Beijing	2–1	Henan Jianye	Haigeng Football Base Field 14, Kunming
16:00

14 March 2021	Shanghai Shengli	2–0	Henan Jianye	Haigeng Football Base Field 5, Kunming
16:00

14 March 2021	Shanghai Shengli	0–0	Beijing	Haigeng Football Base Field 12, Kunming
16:00

=== Group D ===
Pos	Team	Pld	W	D	L	GF	GA	GD	Pts	Qualification
1	Changchun Dazhong Zhuoyue	3	2	1	0	15	1	+14	7	Qualification to the Quarter-finals
2	Dalian Pro	3	2	1	0	7	1	+6	7	Qualification to the Quarter-finals
3	Tianjin Shengde	3	1	0	2	1	11	−10	3	Qualification to the 9th–16th-place play-offs
4	Guangxi Pingguo Beinong	3	0	0	3	0	10	−10	0	

Source: CFA
Rules for classification: 1) Points; 2) Head-to-head points; 3) Head-to-head goal difference; 4) Head-to-head goals scored.

12 March 2021	Changchun Dazhong Zhuoyue	6–0	Guangxi Pingguo Beinong	Haigeng Football Base Field 14, Kunming
16:00

12 March 2021	Dalian Pro	3–0	Tianjin Shengde	Haigeng Football Base Field 16, Kunming
16:00

14 March 2021	Tianjin Shengde	0–8	Changchun Dazhong Zhuoyue	Haigeng Football Base Field 12, Kunming
16:00

14 March 2021	Guangxi Pingguo Beinong	0–3	Dalian Pro	Haigeng Football Base Field 2, Kunming
16:00

16 March 2021	Changchun Dazhong Zhuoyue	1–1	Dalian Pro	Haigeng Football Base Field 14, Kunming
10:00

16 March 2021	Tianjin Shengde	1–0	Guangxi Pingguo Beinong	Haigeng Football Base Field 16, Kunming
10:00

=== Group E ===
Pos	Team	Pld	W	D	L	GF	GA	GD	Pts	Qualification
1	Zhejiang	3	2	1	0	7	1	+6	7	Qualification to the Quarter-finals
2	Meizhou Hakka	3	1	2	0	5	3	+2	5	Qualification to the 9th–16th-place play-offs
3	Shanghai Qiusheng Donghua	3	1	1	1	4	6	−2	4	Qualification to the 9th–16th-place play-offs
4	China U-17	3	0	0	3	1	7	−6	0	

Source: CFA
Rules for classification: 1) Points; 2) Head-to-head points; 3) Head-to-head goal difference; 4) Head-to-head goals scored.

12 March 2021	Meizhou Hakka	2–0	China U-17	Haigeng Football Base Field 12, Kunming
16:00

12 March 2021	Zhejiang	3–0	Shanghai Qiusheng Donghua	Haigeng Football Base Field 16, Kunming
16:00

14 March 2021	Shanghai Qiusheng Donghua	2–2	Meizhou Hakka	Haigeng Football Base Field 14, Kunming
10:00

14 March 2021	China U-17	0–3	Zhejiang	Haigeng Football Base Field 16, Kunming
10:00

16 March 2021	Meizhou Hakka	1–1	Zhejiang	Haigeng Football Base Field 2, Kunming
16:00

16 March 2021	Shanghai Qiusheng Donghua	2–1	China U-17	Haigeng Football Base Field 5, Kunming
16:00

== Final round ==
=== 1–8th classification playoffs ===
==== Quarter-finals ====
19 March 2021	Changchun Dazhong Zhuoyue	7–0	Yongchuan Chashan Zhuhai	Haigeng Football Base Field 2, Kunming
16:00

19 March 2021	Sichuan	0–1	Shanghai Shengli	Haigeng Football Base Field 5, Kunming
16:00

19 March 2021	Zhejiang	1–5	Beijing	Haigeng Football Base Field 14, Kunming
16:00

19 March 2021	Shandong Sports Lottery	4–0	Dalian Pro	Haigeng Football Base Field 12, Kunming
16:00

==== 5th–8th-place play-offs ====
22 March 2021	Yongchuan Chashan Zhuhai	0–1	Sichuan	Haigeng Football Base Field 14, Kunming
16:00

22 March 2021	Zhejiang	3–1	Dalian Pro	Haigeng Football Base Field 2, Kunming
16:00

==== Semi-finals ====
22 March 2021	Changchun Dazhong Zhuoyue	2–0	Shanghai Shengli	Haigeng Football Base Field 12, Kunming
16:00

22 March 2021	Beijing	2–0	Shandong Sports Lottery	Haigeng Football Base Field 5, Kunming
16:00

==== 7th–8th-place play-offs ====
25 March 2021	Yongchuan Chashan Zhuhai	0–1	Dalian Pro	Haigeng Football Base Field 14, Kunming
16:00

==== 5th–6th-place play-offs ====
25 March 2021	Sichuan	0–1	Zhejiang	Haigeng Football Base Field 5, Kunming
16:00

==== 3rd–4th-place play-offs ====
25 March 2021	Shanghai Shengli	4–0	Shandong Sports Lottery	Haigeng Football Base Field 2, Kunming
16:00

==== Final ====
25 March 2021	Changchun Dazhong Zhuoyue	3–0	Beijing	Haigeng Football Base Field 12, Kunming
16:00

=== 9–16th classification playoffs ===
==== 9th–16th-place play-offs ====
19 March 2021	Meizhou Hakka	2–1	Hebei	Haigeng Football Base Field 2, Kunming
10:00

19 March 2021	Jiangsu	3–1	Tianjin Shengde	Haigeng Football Base Field 5, Kunming
10:00

19 March 2021	Henan Jianye	1–4	Shanghai Qiusheng Donghua	Haigeng Football Base Field 14, Kunming
10:00

19 March 2021	Shaanxi Chang'an Athletic	1–1 (0–3 p)	Hainan Qiongzhong	Haigeng Football Base Field 16, Kunming
10:00

==== 13th–16th-place play-offs ====
22 March 2021	Hebei	5–2	Tianjin Shengde	Haigeng Football Base Field 14, Kunming
10:00

22 March 2021	Henan Jianye	1–1 (4–2 p)	Shaanxi Chang'an Athletic	Haigeng Football Base Field 16, Kunming
10:00

==== 9th–12th-place play-offs ====
22 March 2021	Meizhou Hakka	1–0	Jiangsu	Haigeng Football Base Field 2, Kunming
10:00

22 March 2021	Shanghai Qiusheng Donghua	1–0	Hainan Qiongzhong	Haigeng Football Base Field 5, Kunming
10:00

==== 15th–16th-place play-offs ====
25 March 2021	Tianjin Shengde	0–3	Shaanxi Chang'an Athletic	Haigeng Football Base Field 2, Kunming
10:00

==== 13th–14th-place play-offs ====
25 March 2021	Hebei	1–2	Henan Jianye	Haigeng Football Base Field 5, Kunming
10:00

==== 11th–12th-place play-offs ====
25 March 2021	Jiangsu	4–0	Hainan Qiongzhong	Haigeng Football Base Field 14, Kunming
10:00

==== 9th–10th-place play-offs ====
25 March 2021	Meizhou Hakka	2–1	Shanghai Qiusheng Donghua	Haigeng Football Base Field 16, Kunming
10:00
