= Chinwendu Ihezuo =

Nigerian footballer

Personal information
- Full name: Chinwendu Veronica Ihezuo
- Date of birth: 30 April 1997 (age 29)
- Place of birth: Lagos, Nigeria
- Height: 1.75 m (5 ft 9 in)
- Position: Forward

Team information
- Current team: Pachuca
- Number: 30

Senior career*
Years	Team	Apps	(Gls)
2014–2015	Delta Queens F.C.		
2016–2018	BIIK Kazygurt	20	(16)
2019–2020	Henan Jianye	14	(7)
2021–2022	Meizhou Hakka	21	(11)
2023	Monterrey	33	(10)
2024–	Pachuca	84	(38)

International career^{‡}
2012–2014	Nigeria U-17		
2014–2016	Nigeria U-20		
2016–	Nigeria	27	(8)
- * Club domestic league appearances and goals as of 18 August 2026 ‡ National team caps and goals as of 18 August 2026

Chinwendu Veronica Ihezuo OON (born 30 April 1997) is a Nigerian professional footballer who plays as a forward for Liga MX Femenil club Pachuca and the Nigeria women's national team.

== Early life ==
Ihezuo was born on 30 April 1997 in Ajegunle, Lagos, Nigeria. She spent her childhood in Lagos. She is 1.75 m (5 ft 9 in) tall. Her parents were very supportive of her when she started playing football. Her mother supported her interest in the sport by buying her football jerseys in the local market. Through most of her youth, she competed and played with boys in Ajegunle, an area which has produced some of Nigeria's best men's football players.

== Club career ==
From 2012 to 2014, she played for the Pelican Stars of Calabar. After that, she moved to the Delta Queens, and was with them until the end of the 2015 season.

=== BIIK Kazygurt ===
Ihezuo joined the professional club side BIIK Kazygurt of Kazakhstan for the 2016 on a one-year contract. In her debut season with the club where she wore number 19, she scored 16 goals for BIIK Kazygurt in 20 appearances. She competed with the team at the 2016-17 UEFA Women's Champions League, starting two games, and playing 180 minutes. Goalless in that period, she also picked up a yellow card in her team's 3–1 home victory against Verona. She made her debut in Champions League in her team's 3–1 victory against Wexford Youths during tournament qualifying.

=== Henan Huishang F.C. ===
On 7 April 2019 it was announced that she had joined Henan Huishang in the Chinese Women's Super League. On the very same day, she scored on her debut for her new side in a 4–1 defeat to Jiangsu Suning.

Ihezuo's career in China began brightly with six goals coming in just six matches of her side's 2019 CFA Tournament campaign as Henan Huishang finished 9th overall. She was then selected by coach Thomas Dennerby as a member of Nigeria's squad for the 2019 FIFA Women's World Cup.

Over the course of the 2019 Chinese Women's Super League, Ihezuo was the league's third top-scorer with seven goals from her 14 appearances. In spite of her efforts, Henan finished in seventh position out of eight teams.

Owing to the consequences of the COVID-19 pandemic, Ihezuo was unable to return to China to compete in the 2020 Chinese Women's Super League season despite being under contract for a second season. Both Ihezuo and colleague Ebi Onome missed the entire campaign due to the closure of air travel out of Nigeria.

== International career ==
U-17 national team

Ihezuo made her international debut for Nigeria at the 2012 FIFA U-17 Women's World Cup in Azerbaijan. She came away from the tournament with six goals. Five of these goals came in one game against hosts Azerbaijan, which her team won 11–0. The win was Nigeria's biggest in any FIFA World Cup appearance. Her five goals were also a record for most goals scored in a single game at the FIFA U-17 Women's World Cup. The record has previously been held by Germany's Kyra Malinowski and South Korea's Yeo Minji, who scored four goals each in the 2010 edition of the tournament. Her fete was matched by Lorena Navarro at the 2016 edition when the Spaniard scored 5 goals against Jordan. Her six goals also earned her the Silver Boot for the tournament. The award was presented to her at the 2012 Annual General Assembly of the Nigerian Football Federation. Her team was eliminated from the tournament after losing to France in the quarter-finals.

Not named to the squad in 2013, Ihezuo was also a member of the team in 2014. She again competed at the World Cup, wearing number 19 and playing in the team's game against China where she came on as a substitute.

U-20 national team

Ihezuo was first called up to the team in 2014. She represented Nigeria at the 2014 FIFA U-20 Women's World Cup where the team narrowly lost in the finals to Germany. She was one of the leading goal scorers in the competition. That year, she also played for the team in a friendly against Ghana. She scored the game's only goal that saw Nigeria win 1–0.

In September 2016, she was invited to the 29 member strong national team training camp that was preparing for the 2018 FIFA U-20 Women's World Cup. She joined the team late for the camp in October in Abuja, after the national team coach threatened her and other overseas players with being dropped if they did not arrive by 8 October. She had to miss a training session as she needed time to recover from jet lag. As a player, she acknowledged the pressure she felt at camp going into the tournament to perform well.

She scored seven goals for Nigeria in the qualifying competition for the World Cup. One of her goals came in the 16th minute in their return game against South Africa. The goal qualified Nigeria for the FIFA World Cup. Another goal came in Nigeria's 2–1 victory against Congo DR.

Senior national team

Following her performance at the 2014 FIFA U-20 World Cup, she was invited to attend a national team training camp for potential selection to the side that would compete at an African Women's Championship in Namibia.

In March 2016, she was one of 40 players called up to prepare for the 2016 Africa Women Cup of Nations. She was a member of the senior national side for the 2015 All African Games in Congo.

In November 2018, she was selected for the 2018 Africa Women Cup of Nations and appeared as a substitute in the final as Nigeria overcame South Africa to claim the title.

Her first international goal came in January 2019, scoring in victory over Romania in a game played as part of the Meizhou International Women's Football Tournament in China.

On 24 May 2019, Ihezuo was called up to the Nigeria squad for the 2019 FIFA Women's World Cup.

Ihezuo was called up to the Nigeria squad for the 2024 Summer Olympics.

== Career statistics ==
=== Club ===
As of match played 5 November 2025

Appearances and goals by club, season and competition
Club	Season	League			Cup		Continental		Total	
Club	Season	Division	Apps	Goals	Apps	Goals	Apps	Goals	Apps	Goals
BIIK Kazygurt	2016	Kazakhstani Championship	0	0	0	0	5	0	5	0
BIIK Kazygurt	2017	Kazakhstani Championship	0	0	0	0	7	3	7	3
BIIK Kazygurt	2018	Kazakhstani Championship	0	0	0	0	5	1	5	1
BIIK Kazygurt	Total		0	0	0	0	17	4	17	4
Henan Huishang	2019	Chinese Women's Super League	14	7	7	7	0	0	21	14
Henan Huishang	Total		14	7	7	7	0	0	21	14
Meizhou Hakka	2021	Chinese Women's Super League	7	4	0	0	0	0	7	4
Meizhou Hakka	2022	Chinese Women's Super League	14	7	6	4	0	0	20	11
Meizhou Hakka	Total	Chinese Women's Super League	21	11	6	4	0	0	27	15
Monterrey	2022–23	Liga MX Femenil	16	6	0	0	0	0	16	6
Monterrey	2023–24	Liga MX Femenil	17	4	0	0	0	0	17	4
Monterrey	Total		33	10	0	0	0	0	33	10
Pachuca	2023–24	Liga MX Femenil	21	15	0	0	0	0	21	15
Pachuca	2024–25	Liga MX Femenil	39	15	0	0	0	0	39	15
Pachuca	2025–26	Liga MX Femenil	12	6	0	0	4	5	16	11
Pachuca	Total		72	36	0	0	4	5	76	41
Career total			126	57	13	11	21	9	160	77

=== International goals ===
No.	Date	Venue	Opponent	Score	Result	Competition
1.	17 September 2015	Stade Alphonse Massemba-Débat, Brazzaville, Congo	Ivory Coast	1−0	1−2	Football at the 2015 African Games – Women's tournament
2.	20 January 2019	Wuhua County Olympic Sports Centre, Meizhou, China	Romania	1–0	4–1	2019 Four Nations Tournament
3.	29 June 2025	Ziaida Sports Complex, Mohammedia, Morocco	Ghana	1–0	3–1	Friendly
4.	6 July 2025	Larbi Zaouli Stadium, Casablanca, Morocco	Tunisia	3–0	3–0	2024 Women's Africa Cup of Nations
5.	10 July 2025	Larbi Zaouli Stadium, Casablanca, Morocco	Botswana	1–0	1–0	2024 Women's Africa Cup of Nations
6.	18 July 2025	Larbi Zaouli Stadium, Casablanca, Morocco	Zambia	3–0	5–0	2024 Women's Africa Cup of Nations
7.	24 October 2025	Stade de Kégué, Lomé, Togo	Benin	1–0	2–0	2026 Women's Africa Cup of Nations qualification
8.	3 March 2026	Stade Militaire, Yaounde, Cameroon	Cameroon	1−1	3−1	Friendly

== Honours ==
BIIK Kazygurt

- Kazakhstani Championship: 2016, 2017, 2018
- Kazakhstani Women's Cup: 2016, 2017, 2018

Pachuca

- Liga MX Femenil: 2025 Clausura

Nigeria

- Women's Africa Cup of Nations: 2018, 2024
- FIFA U-20 Women's World Cup runner-up: 2014

Individual

- FIFA U-17 Women's World Cup Silver Boot: 2012

Orders

- Officer of the Order of the Niger
