= List of Portsmouth F.C. Ladies seasons =

This is a list of seasons played by Portsmouth FC Ladies in English football since 2003, when the Hampshire-based side entered the Women's Premier League. In all but one of the seasons since, Portsmouth FC Ladies have played in the Women's Premier League Southern Division, except for one season in the Women's Premier League National Division in the 2012/13 season.

| Season | League | | | | | | | | | FA Cup | League Cup | Hampshire Cup | Top Goalscorer | |
| Season | Division | P | W | D | L | F | A | Pts | Pos | FA Cup | League Cup | Hampshire Cup | Name | Goals |
|---|---|---|---|---|---|---|---|---|---|---|---|---|---|---|
| 2003/2004 | WPL South | 24 | 9 | 1 | 14 | 43 | 48 | 28 | 9 | NA | NA | NA | NA | NA |
| 2004/2005 | WPL South | 22 | 13 | 5 | 4 | 44 | 29 | 44 | 2 | NA | R1 | W | Stacey Nevin | 8 |
| 2005/2006 | WPL South | 22 | 12 | 4 | 6 | 69 | 58 | 40 | 4 | NA | R2 | NA | Charley Wilson | 15 |
| 2006/2007 | WPL South | 22 | 14 | 5 | 3 | 63 | 25 | 47 | 2 | R3 | PRL | W | Brooke Chaplen | 11 |
| 2007/2008 | WPL South | 22 | 13 | 3 | 6 | 69 | 32 | 42 | 4 | R5 | R3 | R/U | Brooke Chaplen | 8 |
| 2008/2009 | WPL South | 22 | 9 | 6 | 7 | 62 | 46 | 33 | 5 | R4 | QF | W | Lisa Langrish | 12 |
| 2009/2010 | WPL South | 22 | 11 | 6 | 5 | 50 | 36 | 39 | 4 | R5 | R3 | W | Zoe Nash | 11 |
| 2010/2011 | WPL South | 18 | 10 | 1 | 7 | 40 | 37 | 31 | 4 | R3 | SF | W | Lindsey Roe | 9 |
| 2011/2012 | WPL South | 18 | 12 | 3 | 3 | 55 | 27 | 39 | 1 | R3 | QF | W | Jemma Tewkesbury | 17 |
| 2012/2013 | WPL National | 18 | 3 | 4 | 11 | 22 | 41 | 13 | 9 | R4 | SF | W | Charley Wilson | 20 |
| 2013/2014 | WPL South | 20 | 12 | 1 | 7 | 42 | 29 | 37 | 4 | QF | GS | W | Lucy Quinn | 20 |
| 2014/2015 | WPL South | 22 | 18 | 2 | 2 | 62 | 25 | 56 | 1 | R4 | SF | W | Ini Umotong | 29 |

== Key ==
- P = Played
- W = Games won
- D = Games drawn
- L = Games lost
- F = Goals for
- A = Goals against
- Pts = Points
- Pos = Final position
- WPL National = Women's Premier League National Division
- WPL South = Women's Premier League Southern Division
- PRL = Preliminary Round
- GS = Group Stage
- R1 = Round 1
- R2 = Round 2
- R3 = Round 3
- R4 = Round 4
- R5 = Round 5
- QF = Quarter-Finals
- SF = Semi-Finals
- R/U = Runners-up
- W = Winners

| Champions | Runners-up | Promoted | Relegated |

Note: bold text indicates a competition won.
