= 2019 Four Nations Tournament (women's football) =

Meizhou International Tournament

Tournament details
- Host country: China
- City: Meizhou
- Dates: 17–20 January 2019
- Teams: 4 (from 3 confederations)
- Venue(s): 1 (in 1 host city)

Final positions
- Champions: China (7th title)
- Runners-up: South Korea
- Third place: Nigeria
- Fourth place: Romania

Tournament statistics
- Matches played: 4
- Goals scored: 12 (3 per match)
- Top scorer(s): (China) Li Ying (2 goals)

The 2019 Four Nations Tournament was the 18th edition of the Four Nations Tournament, an invitational women's football tournament held annually in China. The tournament used single-elimination instead of single round-robin system for the first time.

== Teams ==
Team	FIFA Rankings (December 2018)
South Korea	14
China (host)	15
Nigeria	39
Romania	41

== Venues ==
Wuhua County, Meizhou	Huitang Stadium is located in China
Wuhua County Olympic Sports Centre; Huitang Stadium	Huitang Stadium is located in China
23.912864°N 115.769322°E	Huitang Stadium is located in China
Capacity: 30,000	Huitang Stadium is located in China

== Matches ==
All times are local (UTC+08:00).

=== Bracket ===
Semi-finals
17 January - Meizhou
South Korea	3
Romania	0
17 January - Meizhou
China	3
Nigeria	0

Final
20 January - Meizhou
South Korea	0
China	1
Third place
20 January - Meizhou
Romania	1
Nigeria	4

=== Semi-finals ===
17 January 2019
15:00

South Korea	3–0	Romania
Yeo Min-ji 39'; Jung Seol-bin 45'; Lee Geum-min 61'	Report

Wuhua County Olympic Sports Centre, Meizhou
Attendance: 8,038
Referee: Gu Chunhan (China)
17 January 2019
19:35

China	3–0	Nigeria
Zhang Rui 9'; Li Ying 64', 90+3'	Report

Wuhua County Olympic Sports Centre, Meizhou
Attendance: 13,618
Referee: Mi Siyu (China)

=== Third-place playoff ===
20 January 2019
15:00

Romania	1–4	Nigeria
Olar 55'	Report	Ihezuo 44'; Ebi 63'; Chikwelu 68'; Umotong 83'

Wuhua County Olympic Sports Centre, Meizhou
Attendance: 7,319
Referee: Chang Xinxin (China)

=== Final ===
20 January 2019
19:35

South Korea	0–1	China
	Report	Gu Yasha 16'

Wuhua County Olympic Sports Centre, Meizhou
Attendance: 17,999
Referee: Qin Liang (China)

== Goalscorers ==
There have been 12 goals scored in 4 matches, for an average of 3 goals per match.

2 goals

- (China) Li Ying

1 goal

- (China) Gu Yasha
- (China) Zhang Rui
- (Nigeria) Rita Chikwelu
- (Nigeria) Onome Ebi
- (Nigeria) Chinwendu Ihezuo
- (Nigeria) Iniabasi Umotong
- (Romania) Florentina Spânu
- (South Korea) Jung Seol-bin
- (South Korea) Lee Geum-min
- (South Korea) Yeo Min-ji
