= Li Ying (footballer, born 1993) =

Chinese footballer (born 1993)

Li Ying 李影
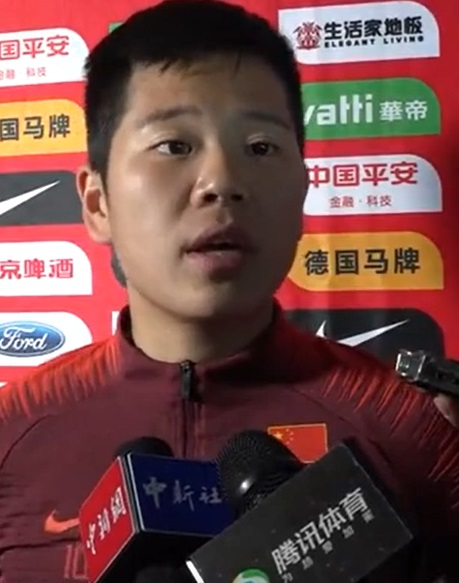

Personal information
- Full name: Li Ying
- Date of birth: 7 January 1993 (age 33)
- Place of birth: Dadukou, Chongqing, Sichuan, China
- Height: 1.72 m (5 ft 8 in)
- Position: Striker

Team information
- Current team: Chongqing Yongchuan Chashanzhuhai
- Number: 10

Senior career*
Years	Team	Apps	(Gls)
2012	Hangzhou Xizi		
2013	Suwon FMC		
2014–2018	Shandong Sports Lottery W.F.C		
2019	Guangdong		
2020-2021	Shandong Jinghua	13	(7)
2022	Zhejiang Hangzhou	1	(2)
2023-	Chongqing Yongchuan Chashanzhuhai	3	(1)

International career^{‡}
2012–2013	China U-20	5	(0)
2012–2022	China	121	(48)
Medal record
Women's football
Representing China
AFC Women's Asian Cup
Gold medal – first place	2022 India
Bronze medal – third place	2018 Jordan
Bronze medal – third place	2014 Vietnam
Asian Games
Silver medal – second place	2018 Palembang	Team
- * Club domestic league appearances and goals as of 25 June 2019 ‡ National team caps and goals as of 13 February 2020

Li Ying (Chinese: 李影; pinyin: Lǐ Yǐng; born 7 January 1993) is a Chinese footballer who plays for Chongqing Yongchuan Chashanzhuhai in the Chinese Women's Super League. Considered a star of the sport in China, she plays as a forward.

On June 22, 2021, she announced on Chinese microblogging platform Sina Weibo her relationship with girlfriend Chen Leilei. This made Li the first Chinese sports player to officially come out as a lesbian. Her Weibo post went viral before it was deleted, with some speculating that Li might have been put under pressure from authorities following the announcement.

After coming-out, she was selected for the Chinese team in the Women’s Asian Cup in India of 2022, appearing as a substitute in the first match of the tournament, a 4-0 victory against Chinese Taipei.

== Honours ==
China

- Asian Games silver medalist: 2018
- AFC Women's Asian Cup: 2022

Individual

- IFFHS AFC Woman Team of the Decade 2011–2020

== International goals ==
No.	Date	Venue	Opponent	Score	Result	Competition
1.	24 July 2013	Hwaseong, South Korea	South Korea	2–1	2–1	2013 EAFF Women's East Asian Cup
2.	27 November 2013	Parramatta, Australia	Australia	1–2	1–2	Friendly
3.	15 May 2014	Hồ Chí Minh City, Vietnam	Thailand	2–0	7–0	2014 AFC Women's Asian Cup
4.	13 January 2015	Foshan, China	South Korea	1–0	2–3	2015 Four Nations Tournament
5.	6 April 2018	Amman, Jordan	Thailand	3–0	4–0	2018 AFC Women's Asian Cup
6.	9 April 2018	Amman, Jordan	Philippines	1–0	3–0	2018 AFC Women's Asian Cup
7.	9 April 2018	Amman, Jordan	Philippines	3–0	3–0	2018 AFC Women's Asian Cup
8.	12 April 2018	Amman, Jordan	Jordan	5–1	8–1	2018 AFC Women's Asian Cup
9.	12 April 2018	Amman, Jordan	Jordan	6–1	8–1	2018 AFC Women's Asian Cup
10.	17 April 2018	Amman, Jordan	Japan	1–3	1–3	2018 AFC Women's Asian Cup
11.	20 April 2018	Amman, Jordan	Thailand	1–0	3–1	2018 AFC Women's Asian Cup
12.	12 June 2018	Cleveland, United States	United States	1–1	1–2	Friendly
13.	17 August 2018	Palembang, Indonesia	Hong Kong	3–0	7–0	2018 Asian Games
14.	8 October 2018	Chongqing, China	Thailand	1–0	2–0	2018 Yongchuan International Tournament
15.	1 December 2018	Dededo, Guam	Mongolia	6–0	10–0	2019 EAFF E-1 Football Championship
16.	3 December 2018	Dededo, Guam	Hong Kong	6–0	6–0	2019 EAFF E-1 Football Championship
17.	17 January 2019	Meizhou, China	Nigeria	2–0	3–0	2019 Four Nations Tournament
18.	17 January 2019	Meizhou, China	Nigeria	3–0	3–0	2019 Four Nations Tournament
19.	13 June 2019	Paris, France	South Africa	1–0	1–0	2019 FIFA Women's World Cup
20.	7 February 2020	Sydney, Australia	Thailand	1–0	6–1	2020 AFC Women's Olympic Qualifying Tournament
21.	7 February 2020	Sydney, Australia	Thailand	6–0	6–1	2020 AFC Women's Olympic Qualifying Tournament
22.	10 February 2020	Sydney, Australia	Chinese Taipei	5–0	5–0	2020 AFC Women's Olympic Qualifying Tournament

== See also ==
- List of women's footballers with 100 or more caps
