= Tiantangbao station =

Metro station in Chongqing, China

Tiantangbao 天堂堡
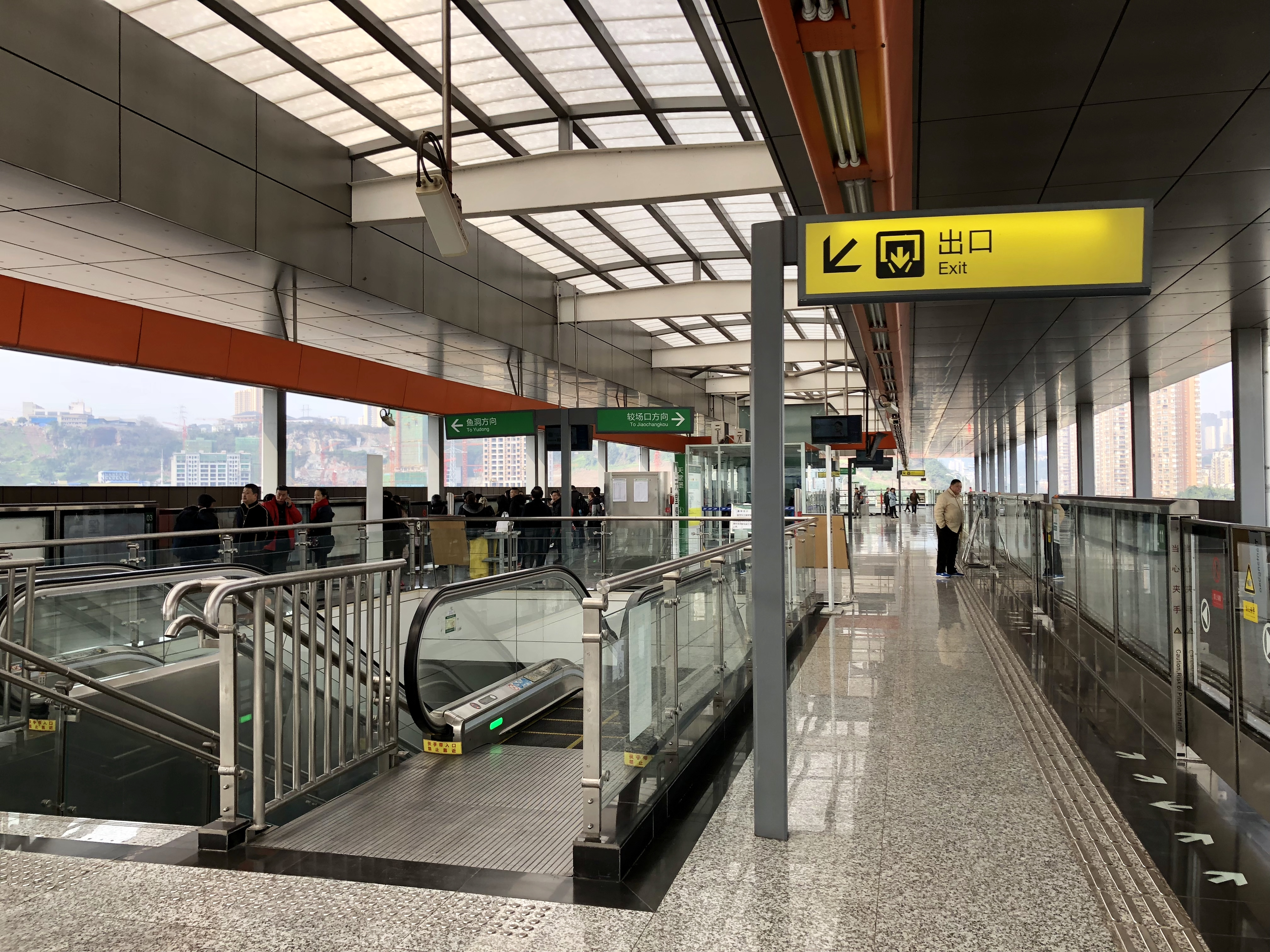

General information
- Location: Chongqing; China
- Operated by: Chongqing Rail Transit Corp., Ltd
- Line: Line 2
- Platforms: 2 (1 island platform)

Construction
- Structure type: Elevated

Other information
- Station code: /

History
- Opened: 30 December 2014; 11 years ago

Services
Preceding station	Chongqing Rail Transit	Following station
Xinshancun towards Jiaochangkou	Line 2	Jianqiao towards Yudong
Location

Tiantangbao is a station on Line 2 of Chongqing Rail Transit in Chongqing Municipality, China, which opened in 2014. It is located in Dadukou District. Currently, it also serves as the southern terminus of 8 car trains.

== Station structure ==
5F; Platforms	Line 2 to Jiaochangkou (Xinshancun)
5F; Platforms	Island platform
5F; Platforms	Line 2 to Yudong (Jianqiao)
4F; Concourse	Exit 2, Customer service, Vending machines, Toilets
1F; Concourse	Exit 1
