= Jinjiawan station =

Chongqing Rail Transit station

Jinjiawan 金家湾
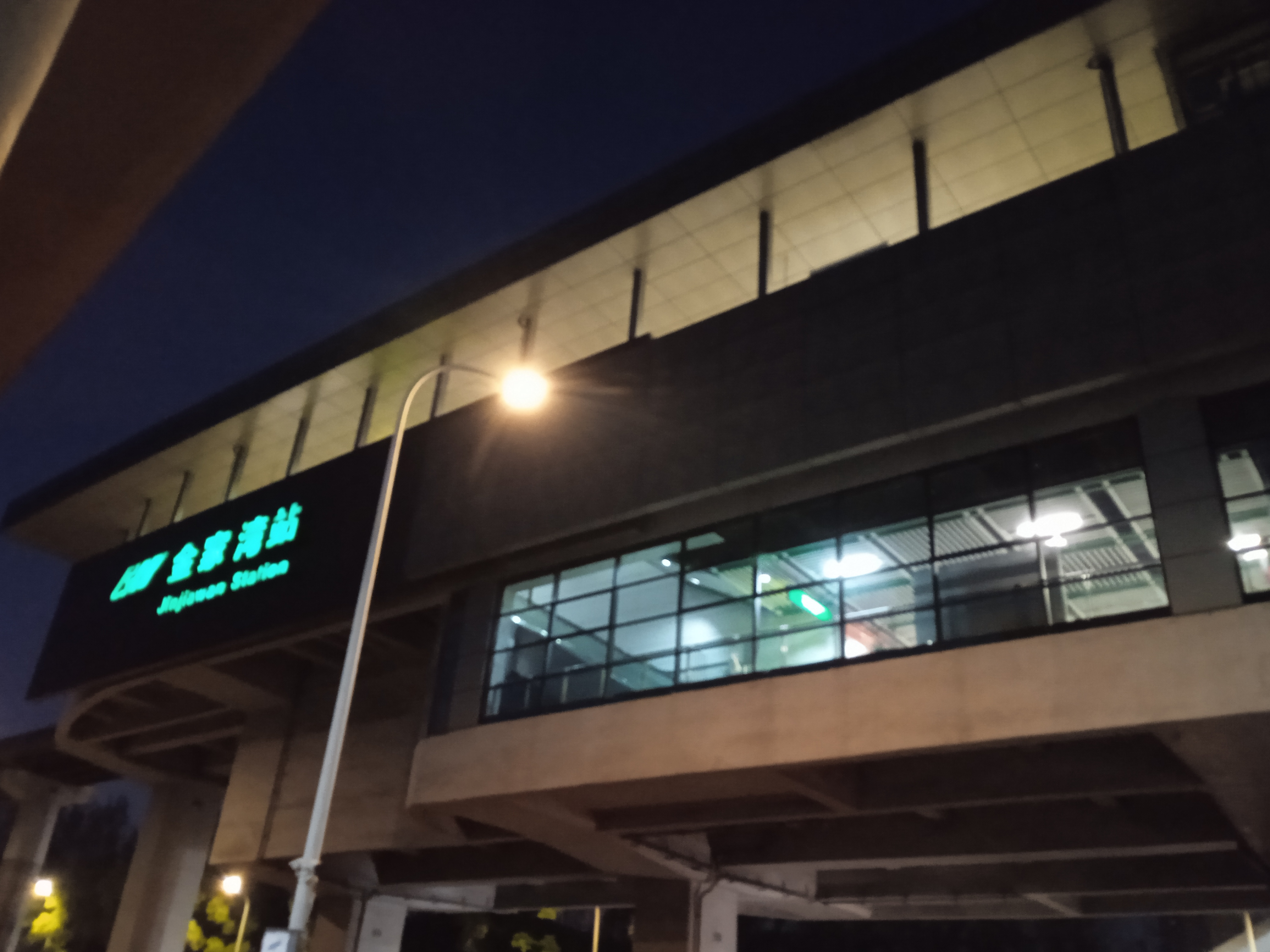
- Outside Jinjiawan Station

General information
- Location: Chongqing; China
- Coordinates: 29.4405°N 106.4716°E
- Operated by: Chongqing Rail Transit Corp., Ltd
- Line: Line 2
- Platforms: 2 side platforms

Construction
- Structure type: Elevated

Other information
- Station code: /

History
- Opened: 30 December 2014; 11 years ago

Services
Preceding station	Chongqing Rail Transit	Following station
Jianqiao towards Jiaochangkou	Line 2	Liujiaba towards Yudong
Location

Jinjiawan Station is a station on Line 2 of Chongqing Rail Transit in Chongqing municipality, China. It is located in Dadukou District and opened in 2014.

== Station structure ==
3F; Platforms	Side platform
3F; Platforms	Line 2 to Jiaochangkou (Jianqiao)
3F; Platforms	Line 2 to Yudong (Liujiaba)
3F; Platforms	Side platform
2F; Concourse	Exits, Customer service, Vending machines, Toilets
