= Xinshancun station =

Metro station in Chongqing, China

Coordinates: 29°28′20″N 106°28′37″E

Xinshancun 新山村
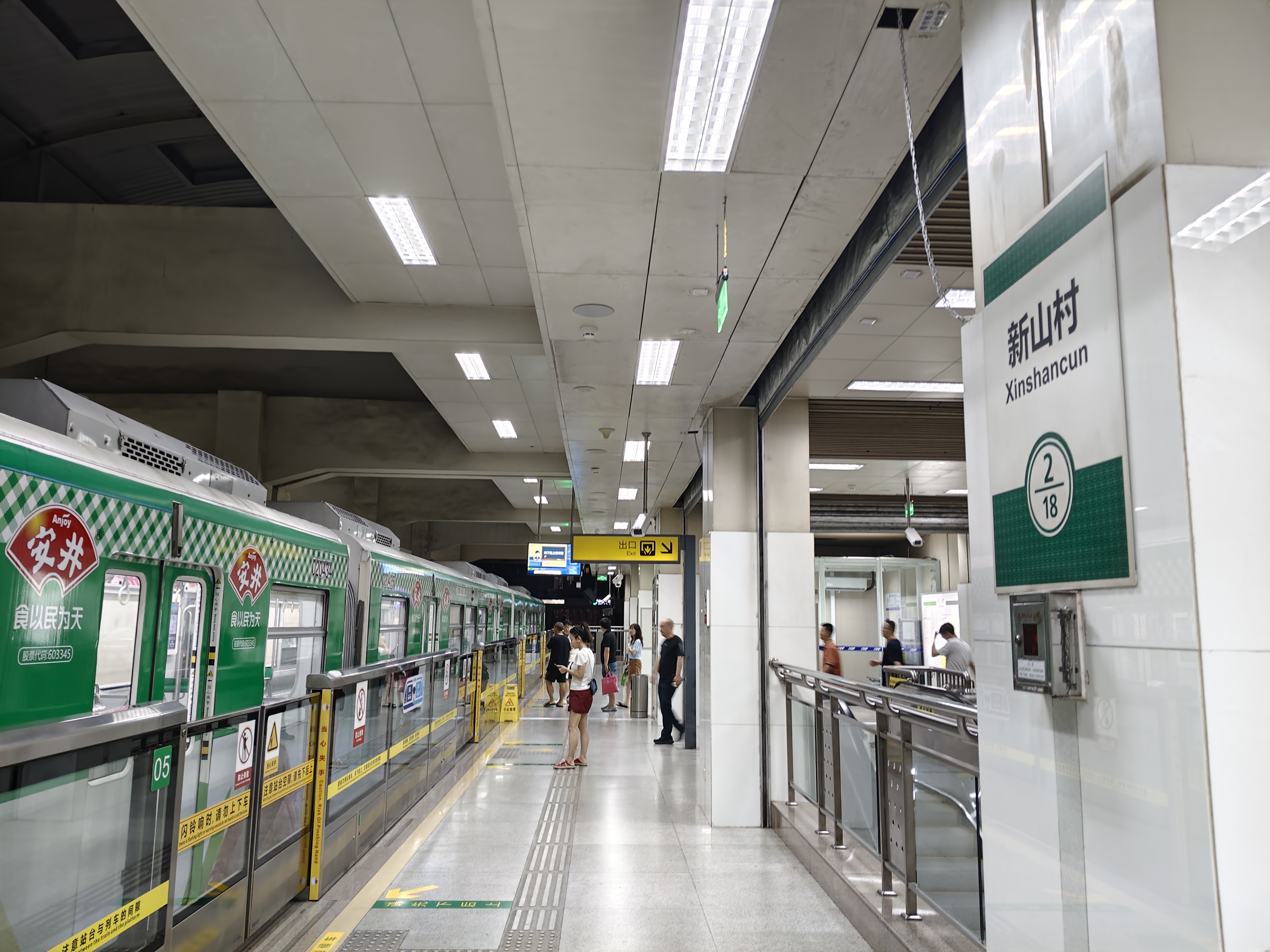
- Platform

General information
- Location: Chongqing; China
- Operated by: Chongqing Rail Transit Corp., Ltd
- Line: Line 2
- Platforms: 2 side platforms

Construction
- Structure type: Elevated

Other information
- Station code: /

History
- Opened: 1 July 2006; 19 years ago

Services
Preceding station	Chongqing Rail Transit	Following station
Dadukou towards Jiaochangkou	Line 2	Tiantangbao towards Yudong
Location

Xinshancun is a station on Line 2 of Chongqing Rail Transit in Chongqing Municipality, China. It is located in Dadukou District. It opened in 2006.

== Station structure ==
3F; Platforms	Side platform
3F; Platforms	Line 2 to Jiaochangkou (Dadukou)
3F; Platforms	Line 2 to Yudong (Tiantangbao)
3F; Platforms	Side platform
2F; Concourse	Customer service, Vending machines, Toilets
1F; Concourse	Exits
