= Ini-Abasi Umotong =

Nigerian footballer

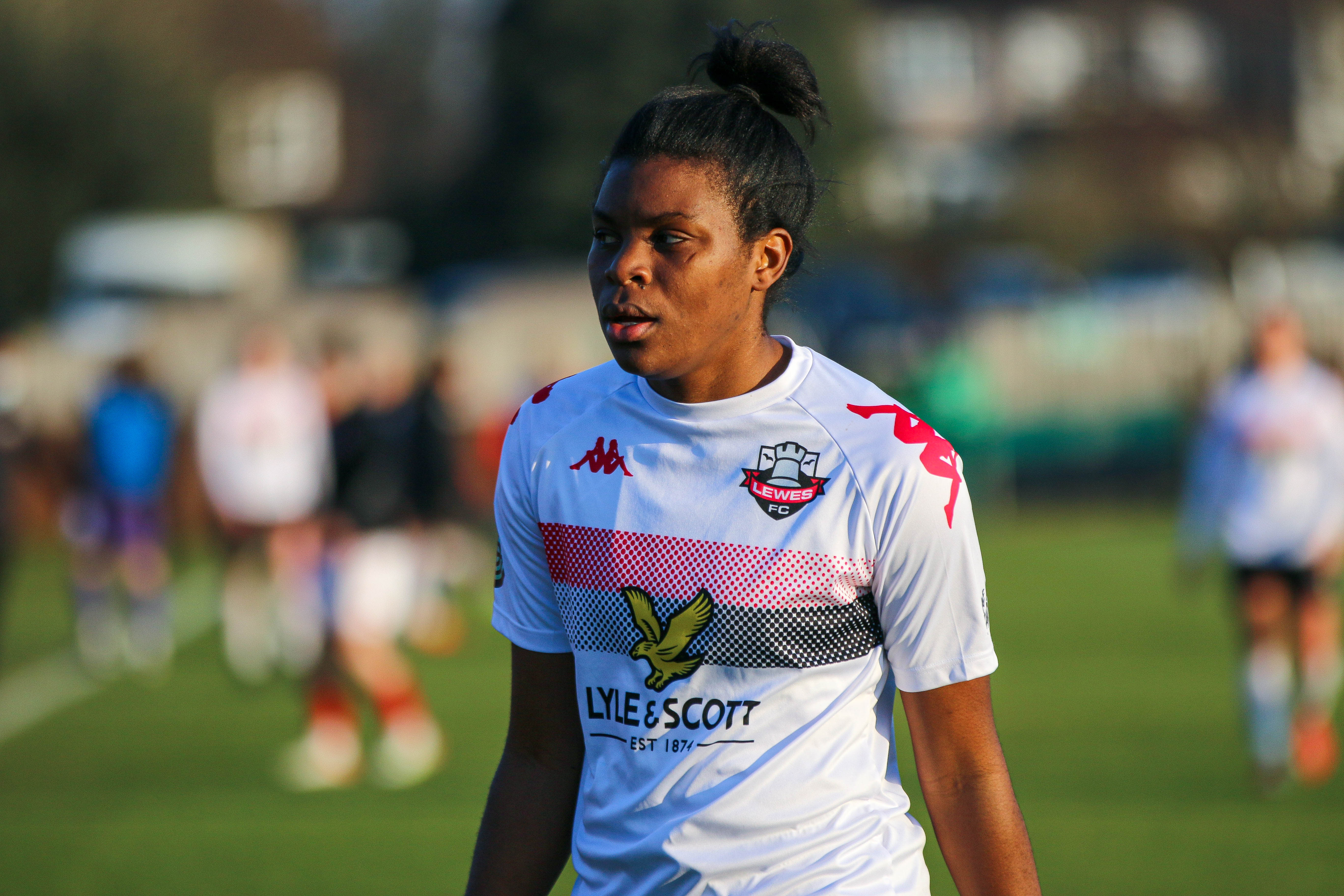
- Umotong playing for Lewes in 2022

Personal information
- Full name: Ini-Abasi Anefiok Umotong
- Date of birth: 15 May 1994 (age 32)
- Place of birth: Calabar, Nigeria
- Height: 1.74 m (5 ft 9 in)
- Position: Forward

Youth career
- Birmingham City
- 2011–2012: Aston Villa

College career
Years	Team	Apps	(Gls)
2012–2013	Wright State Raiders	38	(11)

Senior career*
Years	Team	Apps	(Gls)
2014–2016	Portsmouth	45	(54)
2016–2017	Oxford United	26	(17)
2017–2020	Brighton & Hove Albion	46	(11)
2020	Växjö DFF	15	(2)
2021–2022	Lewes	20	(9)

International career^{‡}
2015–2019	Nigeria	7	(1)
- * Club domestic league appearances and goals as of 31 July 2020 (UTC) ‡ National team caps and goals as of 21 May 2018 (UTC)

Ini-Abasi Anefiok Umotong (born 15 May 1994) is a Nigerian professional footballer who plays as a forward.

== Early life ==
Born in Calabar, Nigeria, Umotong alongside her family moved to Birmingham, England when she was one year old. She is the youngest of six siblings born to Dr Ben Anefiok and Grace Umotong of Ikono in Old Cross River State. She began playing football at the age of five and it was in Primary school where she was spotted by Birmingham City in 2003. She later attended the selective King Edward VI Five Ways Grammar School.

== International career ==
She earned her first call up to the Super Falcons in February, 2015 when coach Edwin Okon invited 36 players to camp to prepare for the 11th All-Africa Games qualifiers, 2016 Olympic Games qualifiers and the 7th FIFA Women’s World Cup finals. The Economics and Actuarial Science undergraduate at the University of Southampton had to skip the first two weeks of the camp in Abuja due to her studies.

On arrival after two weeks, promising Umotong got her first taste of action almost immediately as a late substitute in a warm-up 1–1 draw against a male academy team, showing true dedication in her quest to make the team for Canada 2015. She followed it up with a goal when she came on for 20 minutes in another tune-up match against Nigeria Women Premier League side, Confluence Queens, before becoming the first Portsmouth player to feature in a full international after making her 33-minute debut for Nigeria in the first leg of their All-Africa Games qualifier against Mali in Bamako. She was eventually named in the 23-player list for the World Cup in Canada but did not feature in any of Nigeria's three group matches as the African Champions failed to progress to the knockout stage.

In January 2019 at the Four Nations Tournament in China, Umotong scored her first goal for the Super Falcons. She emerged from the substitute's bench to register the final goal in a 4–1 win over Romania. "One of the stand-out moments of my career," she said.

List of international goals scored by Ini-Abasi Umotong
No.	Date	Venue	Opponent	Score	Result	Competition	Ref.
1	20 January 2019	Wuhua Olympic Sports Center, China	Romania	4-1	4-1	2019 Four Nations Tournament	

== Club career ==
Umotong's phenomenal first season (2014–15) at Portsmouth has opened the path for her international career, after her goal scoring exploits led the FA Women's Premier League Southern Division side to win their seventh successive Hampshire County Cup and the league title, while narrowly missing out on promotion to the FA Women's Super League 2. With 29 goals in 25 league and cup matches, Umotong emerged top goal scorer for Pompey.

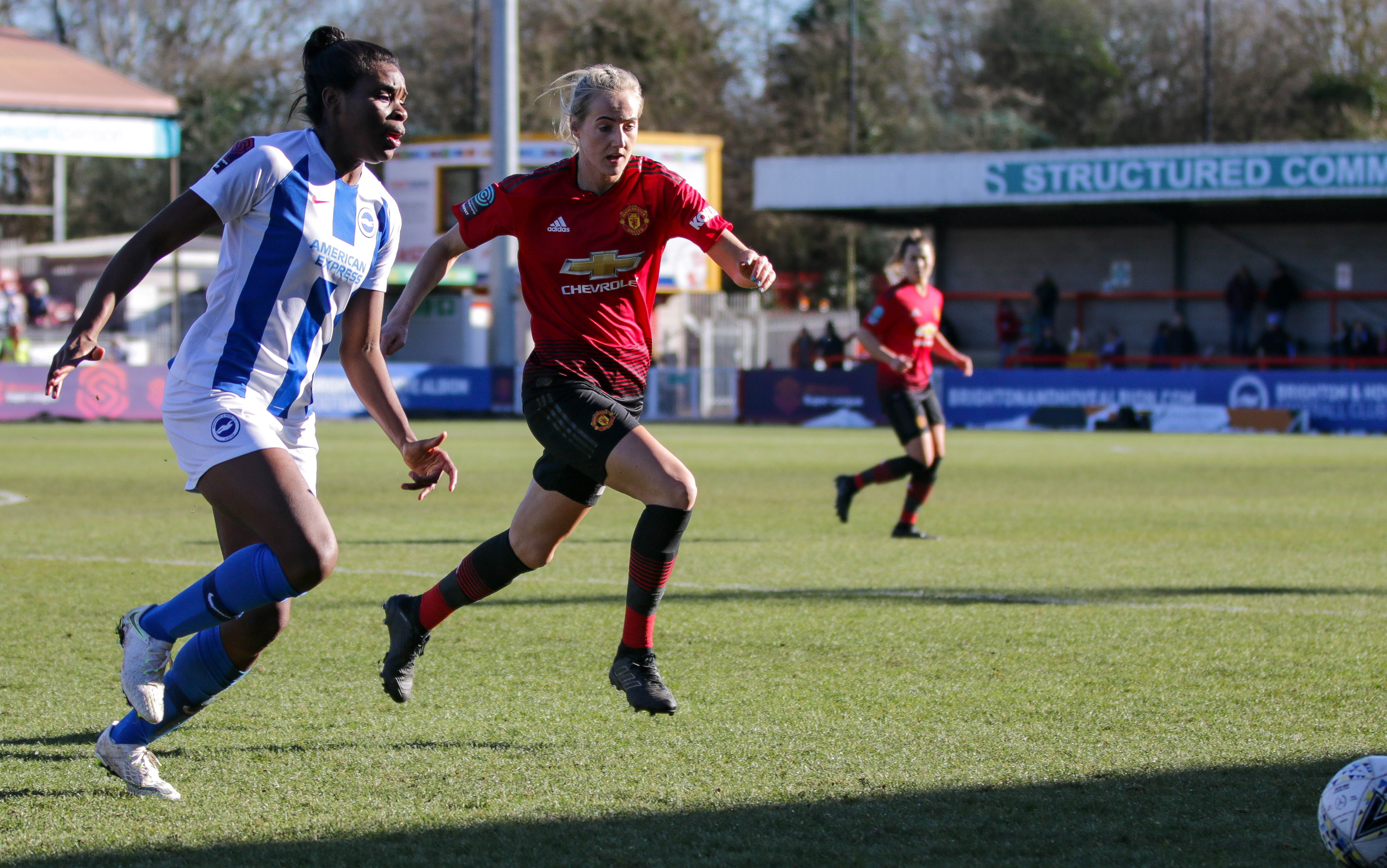
Umotong (left) playing for Brighton & Hove Albion against Manchester United in February 2019

In February 2016, Umotong left Portsmouth for FA WSL 2 club Oxford United. Oxford manager Les Taylor was pleased with the signing: "Ini is a striker who possesses both power and pace." She had scored 25 goals for Portsmouth during the first part of 2015–16. With Oxford Umotong continued to score regularly, finishing FA WSL 2 top-goalscorer with 13 goals in 19 appearances, before adding four goals in seven appearances in the FA WSL Spring Series.

After a transfer to Brighton & Hove Albion in July 2017, Umotong scored eight league goals to help the Seagulls finish second in the re-branded second tier (now known as the FA Women's Championship). When Brighton successfully bid for a franchise in the top division, Umotong was one of the club's existing players to be kept on. She hailed the influence of Brighton coach Hope Powell, crediting the former England manager with a dramatic improvement in her game.

== Personal life ==
Before becoming a full-time footballer with Brighton, Umotong combined her football career with her studies for an Economics degree at the University of Southampton. She graduated with first-class honours and claimed to have been inspired by fellow British-Nigerian footballer Eniola Aluko.

== Honours ==
Portsmouth F.C. Women

- FA Women's Premier League Southern Division (1): 2015
- Hampshire County Cup (1): 2015
