= 2014 Four Nations =

2014 Four Nations might refer to:

- 2014 Rugby League Four Nations
- 2014 Four Nations Tournament (women's football)

== See also ==
- 2014 Four Nationals Figure Skating Championships
