= Dadukou station =

Metro station in Chongqing, China

Coordinates: 29.4649°N 106.4957°E

Dadukou 大渡口
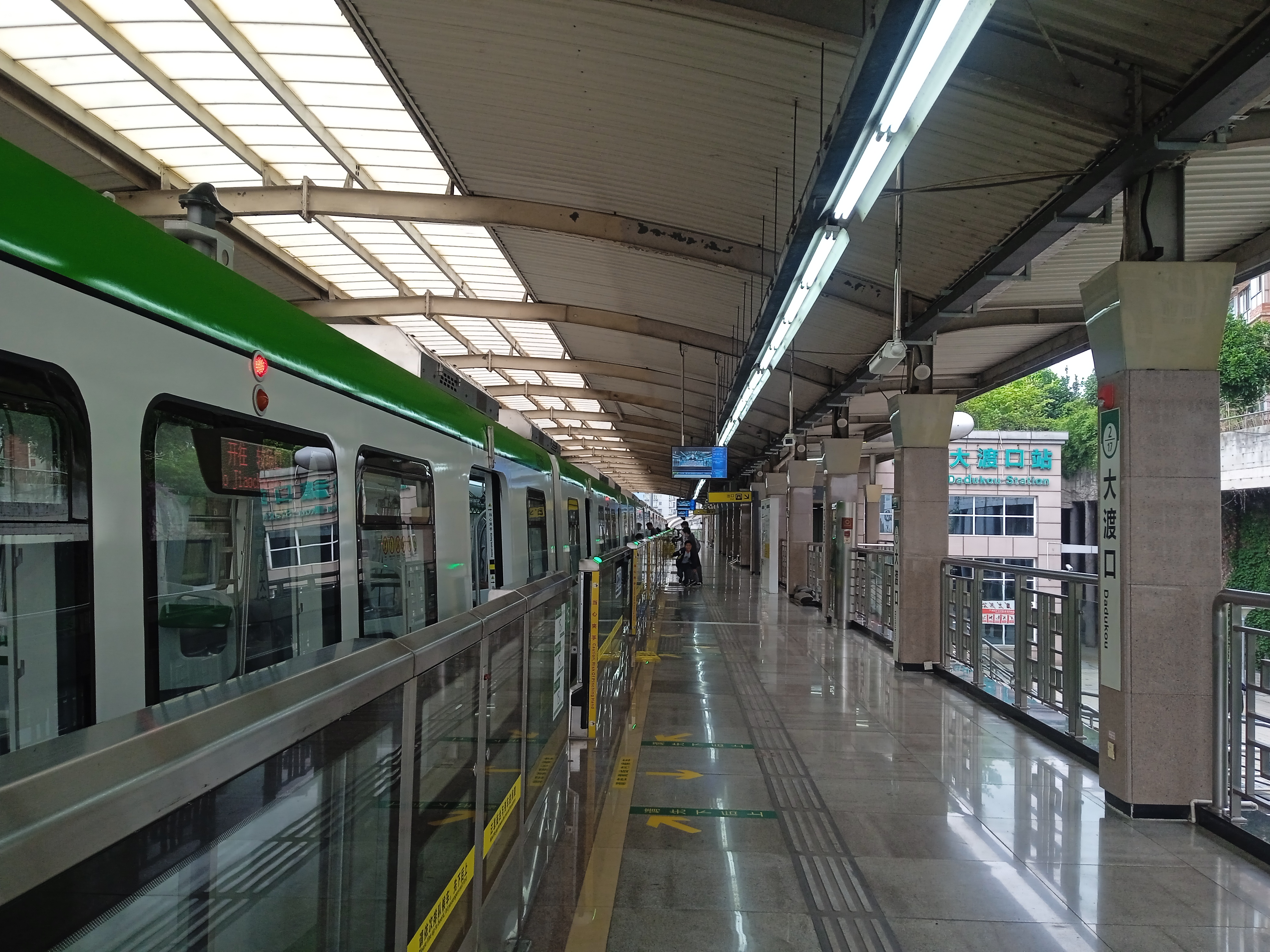

General information
- Location: Chongqing; China
- Operated by: Chongqing Rail Transit Corp., Ltd
- Line: Line 2
- Platforms: 2 side platforms

Construction
- Structure type: Elevated

Other information
- Station code: /

History
- Opened: 1 July 2006; 19 years ago

Services
Preceding station	Chongqing Rail Transit	Following station
Ping'an towards Jiaochangkou	Line 2	Xinshancun towards Yudong
Location

Dadukou is a station on Line 2 of Chongqing Rail Transit in Chongqing Municipality, China. It is located in Dadukou District. It opened in 2006.

== Station structure ==
2F; Platforms	Side platform
2F; Platforms	Line 2 to Jiaochangkou (Ping'an)
2F; Platforms	Line 2 to Yudong (Xinshancun)
2F; Platforms	Side platform
1F; Concourse	Exits, Customer service, Vending machines, Toilets
