= Jiansheng =

Jiansheng 建胜镇
- Town
- Location in Chongqing
- Coordinates: 29°25′50″N 106°29′25″E
- Country: People's Republic of China
- Direct-administered municipality: Chongqing
- District: Dadukou District
- Time zone: UTC+8 (China Standard)

Jiansheng (simplified Chinese: 建胜; traditional Chinese: 建勝; pinyin: Jiànshèng) is a town under the administration of Dadukou District, Chongqing, China. As of 2023, it administers the following six residential communities and six villages:

- Baijusi Community (白居寺社区)
- Xinyu Community (新雨社区)
- Jianxin Community (建新社区)
- Huilongqiao Community (回龙桥社区)
- Baijiayuan Community (百佳园社区)
- Jianlu Community (建路社区)
- Sisheng Village (四胜村)
- Jianlu Village (建路村)
- Simin Village (四民村)
- Minsheng Village (民胜村)
- Qunsheng Village (群胜村)
- Xinjian Village (新建村)

== See also ==
- List of township-level divisions of Chongqing
