= Katrín Ásbjörnsdóttir =

Icelandic footballer (born 1992)

Personal information
- Date of birth: 11 December 1992 (age 33)
- Place of birth: Iceland
- Position: Midfielder

Team information
- Current team: Stjarnan
- Number: 30

Senior career*
Years	Team	Apps	(Gls)
2009–2011	KR	51	(10)
2012–2014	Þór/KA	42	(23)
2015	Klepp	9	(2)
2016–2018	Stjarnan	43	(28)
2020	KR	11	(4)
2021-	Stjarnan	19	(7)

International career
2007–2008	Iceland U17	11	(0)
2009–2011	Iceland U19	15	(5)
2012	Iceland U23	1	(1)
2013–	Iceland	19	(1)
- * Club domestic league appearances and goals as of 20 July 2020

Katrín Ásbjörnsdóttir (born 11 December 1992) is an Icelandic footballer who plays as a midfielder for Stjarnan in the Úrvalsdeild kvenna.

== Career ==
=== Club ===
Katrín made her debut for KR in the Úrvalsdeild kvenna, the top Icelandic league, on 9 May 2009 in a 1–1 home defeat to Valur at the age of 16 and 149 days. Two months later, on 3 July 2009, she scored her first professional goal in a 1:4 away defeat again against Valur. In 2012, she moved to Þór/KA. In 2015, she played one season for Klepp in the Norwegian top-tier league. In 2016, she signed with her current club, Stjarnan.

She sat out the 2019 season due to pregnancy. After playing for KR in 2020, Katrín returned to Stjarnan in 2021.

=== International ===
On 22 September 2007 Katrin debuted for Iceland U17 in a 3–0 away win over Ukraine. Between April 2009 and April 2011, she played 15 games with the U-19 national team and scored five goals. On 1 June 2013 Katrín debuted for the Iceland Senior Team in a 2–3 home defeat against Scotland, when she came as a substitute in the 90th minute for Hólmfríður Magnúsdóttir. On June 24, 2013, Katrín was included in the group called to represent Iceland at the UEFA Women's Euro 2013, however, on July 4, she was replaced by Soffía Arnþrúður Gunnarsdóttir. In 2017, again Katrín was called to represent her country in UEFA Women's Euro. This time, however, she not only went to the tournament but also played two matches, against France and Switzerland.

== International goals ==
No.	Date	Venue	Opponent	Score	Result	Competition
1.	20 October 2016	Yongchuan Sports Center, Chongqing, China	China	2–2	2–2	2016 Yongchuan International Tournament
