= Lei Jiahui =

Chinese footballer

Personal information
- Full name: 雷佳慧
- Date of birth: 22 September 1995 (age 31)
- Place of birth: Henan, China
- Height: 1.69 m (5 ft 7 in)
- Position: Midfielder

Senior career*
Years	Team	Apps	(Gls)
-2016	Henan		
2016	Tianjin		
2017	Henan		
2017	Tianjin		
2018-2022	Henan	13	(0)
2018–2021	->Changchun Jiuyin Loans (loan)	16	(1)

International career
2012	China U-17		
2014	China U-20		
2013–2015	China	6	(0)
- * Club domestic league appearances and goals

Lei Jiahui (born 22 September 1995) is a Chinese former footballer who played as a midfielder.

== International career ==
Having played for the China U-17 team in 2012 and the under-20 team in 2014, Lei made her debut for the full national team in a game against Iceland on 11 March 2013.
