= Henan Jianye W.F.C. =

Chinese association football club

Henan Jianye 河南建业
- Full name: Zalupan Jianye Women's Football Club 河南建业女子足球俱乐部
- Founded: 1983; 43 years ago as Henan Women's Football Team; September 2015; 10 years ago (Professional)
- Ground: Henan Provincial Stadium
- Capacity: 48,000
- Chairman: Zhang Yu
- Manager: Li Zhihao
- League: CWSL
- 2019 CWSL: Chinese Women's Super League, 7th of 8

Henan Jianye Women's Football Club is a Chinese women's football club that is currently participating in the Chinese Women's Super League. The team is based in Zhengzhou, Henan.

== History ==
Founded in 1983 as Henan Women's Football Team, the team became professional in September 2015 and was renamed as Henan Huishang Female Football Club.

== Players ==
=== First Team Squad ===
7th March 2025

Note: Flags indicate national team as defined under FIFA eligibility rules; some limited exceptions apply. Players may hold more than one non-FIFA nationality.

| No. | Pos. | Nation | Player |
|---|---|---|---|
| 2 | DF | CHN | Li Jiayu |
| 4 | DF | CHN | Shang Yaju |
| 6 | DF | CHN | Li Yingrui |
| 7 | FW | ZAM | Kabange Mupopo |
| 8 | MF | CHN | Liu Yan |
| 9 | MF | CHN | Han Suyu |
| 10 | FW | CHN | Lou Jiahui |
| 11 | MF | CHN | Dong Jiabao |
| 12 | FW | CHN | Huang Jiatong |
| 13 | FW | CHN | Liu Ting |
| 15 | DF | CHN | Wang Miao |
| 16 | DF | CHN | Guo Wenjing |
| 17 | DF | CHN | Xu Ziyue |
| 18 | GK | CHN | Luo Yanan |
| 19 | MF | CHN | Li Xinran |

| No. | Pos. | Nation | Player |
|---|---|---|---|
| 20 | FW | CIV | Nrehy |
| 21 | DF | CHN | Liu Xiabing |
| 22 | GK | CHN | Liu Yuan |
| 23 | DF | CHN | Lu Yaqing |
| 24 | GK | CHN | Zheng Minzhu |
| 26 | FW | CHN | Li Wenhui |
| 27 | MF | CHN | Zubila Abduwal |
| 28 | MF | CHN | Fan Mengfei |
| 29 | MF | CHN | Zeng Qingqing |
| 30 | GK | CHN | Li Xiaoxu |
| 31 | MF | CHN | Wang Mengyuan |
| 32 | DF | CHN | Wang Yangting |
| 33 | DF | CHN | Liu Yijing |

=== Notable players ===
- (China) Lei Jiahui
- (China) Lou Jiahui
- (Nigeria) Onome Ebi
- (Nigeria) Chinwendu Ihezuo

== Honours ==
- Chinese Women's League One
- Runners-up: 2017
