= Lianna Narbekova =

Uzbekistani footballer

Personal information
- Full name: Lianna Alisherovna Narbekova
- Date of birth: 6 June 1997 (age 29)
- Place of birth: Tashkent, Uzbekistan
- Position: Forward

Team information
- Current team: Sogdiana

Senior career*
Years	Team	Apps	(Gls)
- Sogdiana

International career^{‡}
	Uzbekistan U19	1+	(0)
2017–	Uzbekistan	6+	(2)
- * Club domestic league appearances and goals ‡ National team caps and goals as of 10 September 2019

Lianna Narbekova (Uzbek: Lianna Norbekova; born 6 June 1997) is an Uzbekistani footballer who plays as a forward for Women's Championship club Sogdiana and the Uzbekistan women's national team.

== International career ==
Narbekova capped for Uzbekistan at senior level during the 2018 AFC Women's Asian Cup qualification, a 1–1 friendly draw against India and the 2019 Hope Cup.

== Internationalgoals ==
No.	Date	Venue	Opponent	Score	Result	Competition
1.	20 October 2016	Yongchuan Stadium, Chongqing, China	Denmark	1–0	1–2	2016 Yongchuan International Tournament
2.	22 October 2016	Yongchuan Stadium, Chongqing, China	China	1–0	1–4	2016 Yongchuan International Tournament
3.	23 August 2021	Milliy Stadium, Tashkent, Uzbekistan	Iran	2–0	2–0	Friendly
4.	17 February 2021	Arslan Zeki Demirci Sports Complex, Ilıca, Turkey	Equatorial Guinea	5–0	5–0	2022 Turkish Women's Cup

== See also ==
- List of Uzbekistan women's international footballers
