= Miao Siwen =

Chinese footballer

Personal information
- Date of birth: 24 January 1995 (age 31)
- Place of birth: Shanghai, China
- Position: Midfielder

Team information
- Current team: Shanghai Shengli
| | Shanghai Shengli | | (8) |

International career
| Years | Team | Apps | (Gls) |
- China

Miao Siwen (born 24 January 1995) is a Chinese football player who plays for Shanghai Shengli. She studied at the East China University of Political Science and Law.
