= Dadukou, Chongqing =

Coordinates: 29.4942°N 106.481°E

Dadukou 大渡口区
- District
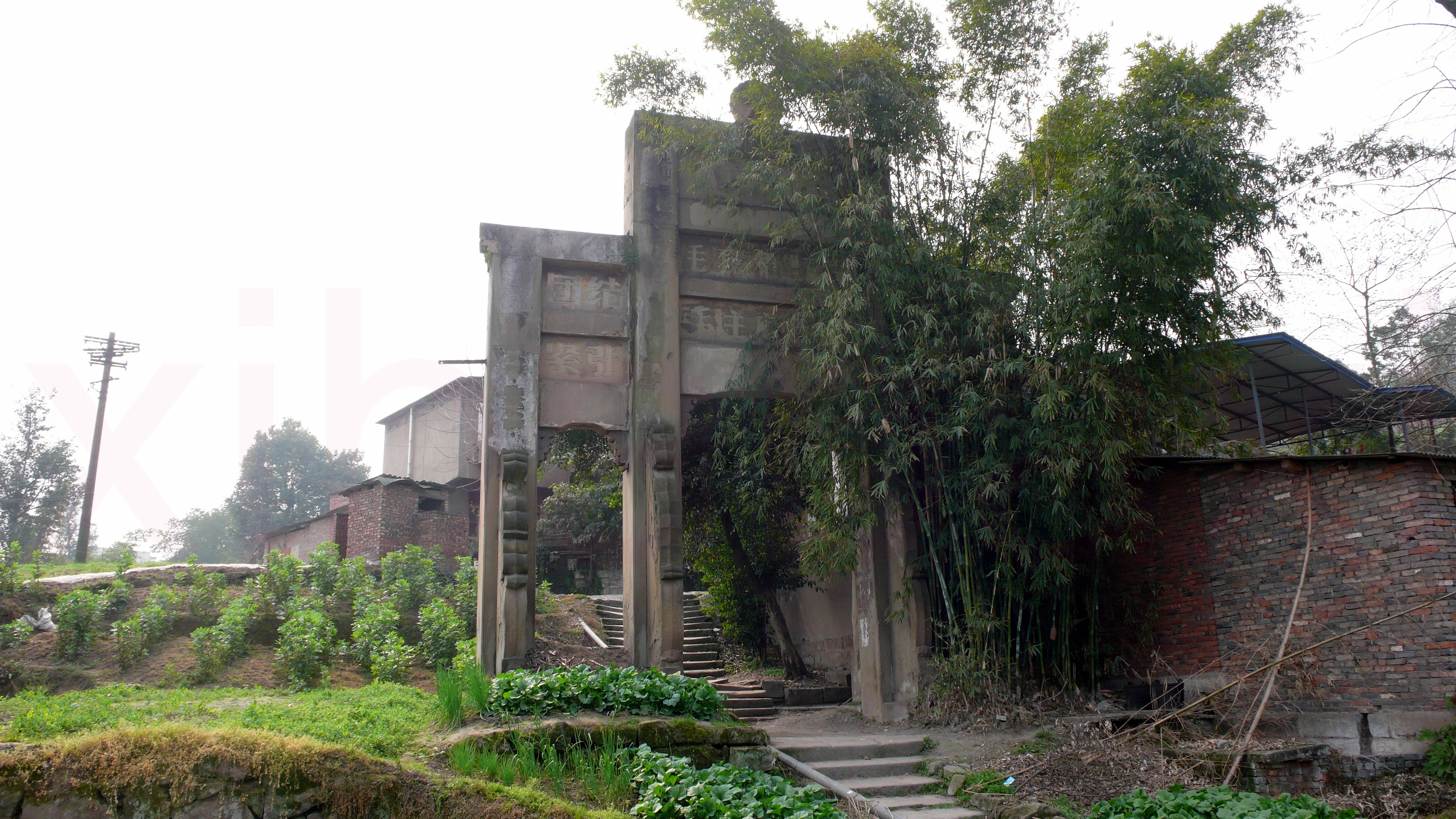
- Interactive map of Dadukou
- Country: People's Republic of China
- Municipality: Chongqing

Area
  - Total: 102 km^{2} (39 sq mi)

Population (2020 census)
  - Total: 421,904
  - Density: 4,140/km^{2} (10,700/sq mi)
- Time zone: UTC+8 (China Standard)

Dadukou District is a district of Chongqing municipality in China. Dadukou is an industrialised district where the Chongqing Iron & Steel Company Limited ("Chong Gang" or 重钢) is based. Most of the facilities, including school, hospitals, shopping-malls, etc. are organised around Chong Gang.

== Administrative divisions ==
Name	Chinese (S)	Hanyu Pinyin	Population (2010)	Area (km^{2})
Xinshancun Subdistrict	新山村街道	Xīnshāncūn Jiēdào	35,874	2.74
Yuejincun Subdistrict	跃进村街道	Yuèjìncūn Jiēdào	48,031	3.2
Jiugongmiao Subdistrict	九宫庙街道	Jiǔgōngmiào Jiēdào	28,675	3.1
Qiezixi Subdistrict	茄子溪街道	Qiézixī Jiēdào	19,738	23.65
Chunhui Road Subdistrict	春晖路街道	Chūnhuīlù Jiēdào	86,306	22
Baqiao town	八桥镇	Bāqiáo Zhèn	36,664	22
Jiansheng town	建胜镇	Jiànshèng Zhèn	21,862	23.65
Tiaodeng town	跳磴镇	Tiàodèng Zhèn	23,892	49.48

== Transport ==
=== Metro ===
Dadukou is currently served by one metro line operated by Chongqing Rail Transit:

- Line 2 - Ping'an, Dadukou, Xinshancun, Tiantangbao, Jianqiao, Jinjiawan, Liujiaba, Baijusi
