= 2016 Yongchuan International Tournament =

SINCERE Cup

Tournament details
- Host country: China
- City: Chongqing
- Dates: 20–24 October 2016
- Teams: 4 (from 2 confederations)
- Venue(s): 1 (in 1 host city)

Final positions
- Champions: China (2nd title)
- Runners-up: Denmark
- Third place: Iceland
- Fourth place: Uzbekistan

Tournament statistics
- Matches played: 6
- Goals scored: 15 (2.5 per match)
- Top scorer(s): (China) Yang Li
- Best player(s): (China) Ren Guixin

The SINCERE Cup 2016 Yongchuan International Tournament (Chinese: 2016年协信杯永川国际女子足球邀请赛) was the second edition of the Yongchuan International Tournament, an invitational women's football tournament held in Yongchuan District, Chongqing, China.

== Participants ==
In October 2016, the participants were announced.

Team	FIFA Rankings (August 2016)
China (host)	13
Iceland	16
Denmark	20
Uzbekistan	42

== Venues ==
Chongqing	Yongchuan Sports Center is located in China
Yongchuan Sports Center	Yongchuan Sports Center is located in China
29.345833°N 105.933611°E	Yongchuan Sports Center is located in China
Capacity: 25,017	Yongchuan Sports Center is located in China

== Standings ==
Team	Pld	W	D	L	GF	GA	GD	Pts
China	3	2	1	0	7	3	+4	7
Denmark	3	2	0	1	3	2	+1	6
Iceland	3	1	1	1	3	3	0	4
Uzbekistan	3	0	0	3	2	7	-5	0

== Match results ==
All times are local, CST (UTC+8).

20 October
16:00

Denmark	2–1	Uzbekistan
Troelsgaard 42'; Larsen 90+1'		Narbekova 10'

Yongchuan Sports Center, Chongqing
Referee: He Xiaohu (China)
20 October
19:35

China	2–2	Iceland
Wang Shuang 53'; Yang Li 82'		Friðriksdóttir 6'; Ásbjörnsdóttir 86'

Yongchuan Sports Center, Chongqing
Referee: Qin Liang (China)
22 October
16:00

China	4–1	Uzbekistan
Yang Li 13', 53', 74'; Wang Shuang 80'		Narbekova 6'

Yongchuan Sports Center, Chongqing
Referee: Law Bik Chi (Hong Kong)
22 October
19:35

Denmark	1–0	Iceland
Rasmussen 39'

Yongchuan Sports Center, Chongqing
Referee: Qin Liang (China)
24 October
16:00

Iceland	1–0	Uzbekistan
Friðriksdóttir 63'

Yongchuan Sports Center, Chongqing
24 October
19:35

China	1–0	Denmark
Ren Guixin 47'

Yongchuan Sports Center, Chongqing
Referee: Qin Liang (China)

== Statistics ==
There were 15 goals scored in 6 matches, for an average of 2.5 goals per match.

4 goals

- (China) Yang Li

2 goals

- (China) Wang Shuang
- (Iceland) Fanndís Friðriksdóttir
- (Uzbekistan) Lianna Narbekova

1 goal

- (China) Ren Guixin
- (Denmark) Sanne Troelsgaard Nielsen
- (Denmark) Stine Larsen
- (Denmark) Johanna Rasmussen
- (Iceland) Katrín Ásbjörnsdóttir
