= Changchun Dazhong Zhuoyue W.F.C. =

Chinese football club

Changchun Public Excellence
- Founded: June 8, 2000; 26 years ago
- Ground: Development Area Stadium, Changchun
- Capacity: 25,000
- President: Zhu Haifeng
- Manager: Liu You
- League: CWSL
- 2021 CWSL: Chinese Women's Super League 5th of 8
Home colours

Changchun Public Excellence (Chinese: 长春大众卓越女子足球俱乐部; pinyin: Zhǎngchūn dàzhòng zhuóyuè nǚzǐ zúqiú jùlèbù) is a Chinese professional football club located in Changchun. They compete in the Chinese Women's Super League, and their home stadium is the Development Area Stadium.

== History ==
Women's football clubs in Changchun traces back to the 1980s, with several schools and factories creating women's football clubs. An important event happened in 1986, when several teams, including Changchun, played a precedent of the current Super League, gaining the title.

The Changchun team, with players including the national team's captain Wang Lili, and players such as Li Yanjie, Wu Xinxin, Lu Haijing and Geng Yan, had great performances in those early tournaments.

In 1999 the Changchun Huaxin team was officially created with Wang Lili as manager and players such as Lou Xiaoxu.

== Players ==
Darlene de Souza joined fellow Brazil women's national football team players Raquel Fernandes and Rafaelle Souza in transferring to Changchun Zhuoyue in January 2016.

In June 2017 the club signed Cristiane Rozeira from Paris Saint-Germain Féminine. Chinese media reported that they made Cristiane the highest-paid female footballer in the world.

In 2020 they signed international Argentinean player Soledad Jaimes.

=== First team squad ===
As of 20 April 2025.

Note: Flags indicate national team as defined under FIFA eligibility rules; some limited exceptions apply. Players may hold more than one non-FIFA nationality.

No.	Pos.	Nation	Player
—	MF	CHN	Liu Jing
—	MF	CHN	Ren Guixin
—	MF	CHN	Pang Fengyue
—	MF	CHN	Lei Jiahui
