= Yang Li (footballer) =

Chinese footballer

Yang Li 杨丽
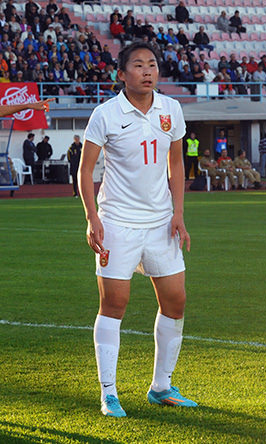

Personal information
- Full name: Yang Li
- Date of birth: 31 January 1991 (age 35)
- Place of birth: Lianyungang, Jiangsu, China
- Height: 1.73 m (5 ft 8 in)
- Position: Striker

Senior career*
Years	Team	Apps	(Gls)
2011–2022	Jiangsu	0	(0)

International career^{‡}
2013–	China	63	(30)
- * Club domestic league appearances and goals as of 25 June 2019 ‡ National team caps and goals as of 25 June 2019

Yang Li (simplified Chinese: 杨丽; traditional Chinese: 楊麗; pinyin: Yáng Lì; born 26 February 1993) is a Chinese footballer who plays as a striker. Her impressive form has subsequently drawn comparisons of her to revered Chinese striker Sun Wen.

== International career ==
Yang was first called up to the Chinese women's national team in a friendly match against New Zealand on 24 November 2013 in a 0–2 lose. Later on she took part of the 2014 Four Nations Tournament. She scored twice on her debut on 13 February 2014 in a 3–1 win against Mexico during the tournament. At the 2014 AFC Women's Asian Cup, Yang was joint top goalscorer with Park Eun-sun with six goals in five games as the team finished third place and qualified for the 2015 FIFA Women's World Cup. She was ruled out of the 2015 FIFA Women's World Cup right before the tournament started due to recurring injuries.

== Honours ==
=== International ===
China PR national football team

- Four Nations Tournament: 2014, 2016

=== Individual ===
- AFC Women's Asian Cup Top Goalscorer: 2014

== International goals ==
No.	Date	Venue	Opponent	Score	Result	Competition
1.	12 January 2014	Guangzhou, China	Hong Kong	4–0	4–0	Friendly
2.	13 February 2014	Chongqing, China	Mexico	1–1	3–1	2014 Four Nations Tournament
3.	13 February 2014	Chongqing, China	Mexico	2–1	3–1	2014 Four Nations Tournament
4.	5 March 2014	Vila Real de Santo António, Portugal	Norway	1–0	1–0	2014 Algarve Cup
5.	12 March 2014	Albufeira, Portugal	Denmark	1–0	1–1 (5–4 p)	2014 Algarve Cup
6.	15 May 2014	Hồ Chí Minh City, Vietnam	Thailand	3–0	7–0	2014 AFC Women's Asian Cup
7.	15 May 2014	Hồ Chí Minh City, Vietnam	Thailand	4–0	7–0	2014 AFC Women's Asian Cup
8.	15 May 2014	Hồ Chí Minh City, Vietnam	Thailand	5–0	7–0	2014 AFC Women's Asian Cup
9.	15 May 2014	Hồ Chí Minh City, Vietnam	Thailand	7–0	7–0	2014 AFC Women's Asian Cup
10.	17 May 2014	Hồ Chí Minh City, Vietnam	Myanmar	3–0	3–0	2014 AFC Women's Asian Cup
11.	25 May 2014	Hồ Chí Minh City, Vietnam	South Korea	2–1	2–1	2014 AFC Women's Asian Cup
12.	5 September 2014	Beijing, China	Vietnam	1–0	5–0	Friendly
13.	5 September 2014	Beijing, China	Vietnam	3–0	5–0	Friendly
14.	5 September 2014	Beijing, China	Vietnam	4–0	5–0	Friendly
15.	5 September 2014	Beijing, China	Vietnam	5–0	5–0	Friendly
16.	18 September 2014	Incheon, South Korea	Chinese Taipei	2–0	4–0	2014 Asian Games
17.	22 September 2014	Incheon, South Korea	Jordan	1–0	5–0	2014 Asian Games
18.	22 September 2014	Incheon, South Korea	Jordan	2–0	5–0	2014 Asian Games
19.	22 September 2014	Incheon, South Korea	Jordan	3–0	5–0	2014 Asian Games
20.	22 September 2014	Incheon, South Korea	Jordan	5–0	5–0	2014 Asian Games
21.	18 September 2015	Weinan, China	Spain	1–1	1–3	Friendly
22.	2 June 2016	Kunshan, China	Thailand	5–0	6–0	Friendly
23.	5 June 2016	Changzhou, China	Thailand	1–0	3–0	Friendly
24.	29 July 2016	São Paulo, Brazil	Zimbabwe	2–0	3–0	Friendly
25.	29 July 2016	São Paulo, Brazil	Zimbabwe	3–0	3–0	Friendly
26.	20 October 2016	Chongqing, China	Iceland	2–1	2–2	2016 Yongchuan International Tournament
27.	22 October 2016	Chongqing, China	Uzbekistan	1–1	4–1	2016 Yongchuan International Tournament
28.	22 October 2016	Chongqing, China	Uzbekistan	2–1	4–1	2016 Yongchuan International Tournament
29.	22 October 2016	Chongqing, China	Uzbekistan	3–1	4–1	2016 Yongchuan International Tournament
30.	9 April 2017	Jiaxing, China	Croatia	2–0	2–1	Friendly
31.	4 April 2019	Wuhan, China	Russia	1–0	4–1	2019 Wuhan International Tournament
