= Lou Jiahui =

Chinese footballer (born 1991)

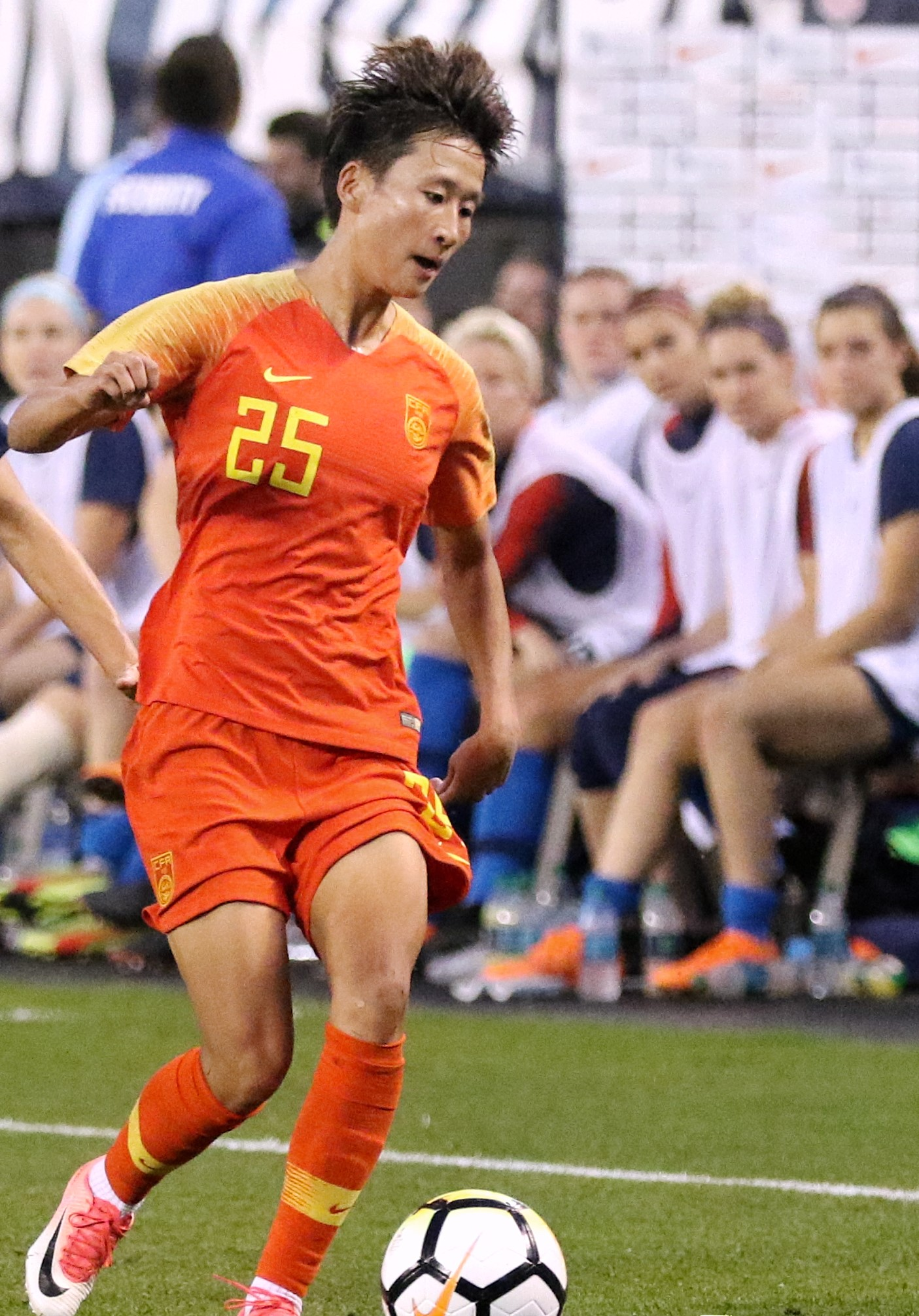
- Lou in 2018

Personal information
- Date of birth: 26 May 1991 (age 35)
- Place of birth: Jiaozuo, China
- Height: 1.67 m (5 ft 6 in)
- Position: Midfielder

Team information
- Current team: Henan Jianye
- Number: 10

Senior career*
Years	Team	Apps	(Gls)
–2021	Henan Jianye	14	(3)
2022-2023	Wuhan Jianghan University	10	(0)
2024-	Henan Jianye		

International career^{‡}
2008	China U20	3	(0)
2008–	China	116	(5)
Medal record
Women's football
Representing China
Asian Games
Silver medal – second place	2018 Palembang	Team
- * Club domestic league appearances and goals as of 1 December 2019 ‡ National team caps and goals as of 13 April 2021

Lou Jiahui (Chinese: 娄佳惠; pinyin: Lóu Jiā Huì; born 26 May 1991) is a Chinese footballer. She plays as a midfielder for Henan Jianye in the CWSL.

== Career ==
The 2008 Summer Olympics held in Beijing was the first major tournament that Lou played at. At the time, she did not have any experience in the Under-20 team and was the youngest player in the squad. She made her first appearance in the opening match, coming on as an 83rd-minute substitute for goalscorer Han Duan in the 2–1 win over Sweden.

== International goals ==
No.	Date	Venue	Opponent	Score	Result	Competition
1.	23 January 2016	Shenzhen Universiade Sports Centre, Foshan, China	Vietnam	6–0	8–0	2016 Four Nations Tournament
2.	19 January 2017	Century Lotus Stadium, Foshan, China	Thailand	2–0	2–0	2017 Four Nations Tournament
3.	1 December 2018	Guam Football Association National Training Center, Dededo, Guam	Mongolia	7–0	10–0	2019 EAFF E-1 Football Championship

== See also ==
- List of women's footballers with 100 or more caps

== Honours ==
China

- Asian Games silver medalist: 2018; bronze medalist: 2022
- AFC Women's Asian Cup: 2022
