= Wuhua County Olympic Sports Centre =

Sports venue in Meizhou, China

Huitang Stadium 惠堂体育场
- Angel's Wings 天使之翼
- Interactive map of Huitang Stadium 惠堂体育场
- Full name: Huitang Stadium 五华奥林匹克体育中心惠堂体育场
- Location: Wuhua County, Guangdong, China
- Coordinates: 23°54′53.1″N 115°45′55.5″E
- Owner: Wuhua County
- Operator: Wuhua County Sports Bureau
- Capacity: 27,000
- Surface: Grass

Construction
- Built: 2016–2018
- Opened: 1 January 2019
- Cost: ¥257 million

Wuhua County Olympic Sports Centre (Chinese: 五华奥林匹克体育中心), formerly known as the Wuhua County Football Culture Park (Chinese: 五华县足球文化公园), is a sports complex located in Wuhua County, Meizhou, Guangdong, China. The complex consists of a football stadium named Huitang Stadium, gymnasium, futsal field, a seven-a-side football field, tennis courts and swimming and diving complex.

The complex is planned to be built in two phases. The first phase is estimated to cost ¥257 million for the football stadium. The stadium is named Huitang Stadium after Wuhua-based footballer Lee Wai Tong. It broke ground in March 2016, and was expected to open in March 2018, but the formal opening was delayed until 1 January 2019 as part of the opening ceremony for the 2019 Hakka Cup. It is the home stadium of Chinese Super League club Meizhou Hakka.
