= 2017 Chinese FA Women's Super Cup =

Dalian Quanjian	Shanghai
5	3
- Date: 7 November 2017
- Venue: Wuhan Sports Center Stadium, Wuhan
- Referee: Mi Siyu

The Dongfeng Renault 2017 Chinese FA Women's Super Cup (Chinese: 东风雷诺2017中国足协女子超级杯) was the 16th Chinese FA Women's Super Cup, an annual football match contested by the winners of the previous season's Chinese Women's Super League and Chinese Women's Football Championship. The match was contested at Wuhan Sports Center Stadium by 2017 Chinese Women's Football Championship winners Shanghai, and Dalian Quanjian, champions of the 2017 Chinese Women's Super League, on 7 November 2017.

== Match ==
=== Details ===
7 November 2017
14:00 UTC+8

Dalian Quanjian	5–3	Shanghai
Liu Jieru 2' (o.g.); Oshoala 19', 40'; Ma Xiaoxu 52'; Wang Shuang 80'		Xiao Yuyi 8'; Miao Siwen 57' (pen.); Tang Jiali 83'

Wuhan Sports Center Stadium, Wuhan
Referee: Mi Siyu
