= 2016 Chinese FA Women's Super Cup =

Dalian Quanjian	Tianjin Huisen
3	3
- Tianjin Huisen won 4–3 on penalties
- Date: 12 November 2016
- Venue: Huizhou Olympic Stadium, Huizhou
- Referee: Peng Xin
- Weather: Cloudy / 24°C

2016 Chinese FA Women's Super Cup (Chinese: 2016中国足球协会女子超级杯) was the 15th Chinese FA Women's Super Cup, an annual football match contested by the winners of Chinese Women's Super League and Chinese Women's Football Championship competitions. The match was played at Huizhou Olympic Stadium on 12 November 2016, and contested by 2016 Chinese Women's Super League winners Dalian Quanjian and 2016 Chinese Women's Football Championship winners Tianjin Huisen. Tianjin Huisen won the match in the penalty shoot-out.

== Match ==
=== Details ===
12 November 2016
16:00 UTC+8

Dalian Quanjian	3–3	Tianjin Huisen
Fabiana 39'; Ma Xiaoxu 48', 80'		Lou Jiahui 17', 33'; Lei Jiahui 64'
Penalties
Ma Xiaoxu (penalty missed); Li Dongna (penalty scored); Wang Shuang (penalty scored); Debinha (penalty scored); Li Wen (penalty missed)	3–4	(penalty scored) Feng Yadi; (penalty missed) Li Xiang; (penalty scored) Han Peng; (penalty scored) Lou Jiahui; (penalty scored) Liu Yanmei

Huizhou Olympic Stadium, Huizhou
Referee: Peng Xin (Shandong)

Assistant referees:
Liu Liying (Hebei)
Wu Danxia (Guangdong)
Fourth official:
Wang Kun (Shandong)
