= Asisat Oshoala =

Nigerian footballer (born 1994)

Asisat Oshoala OON
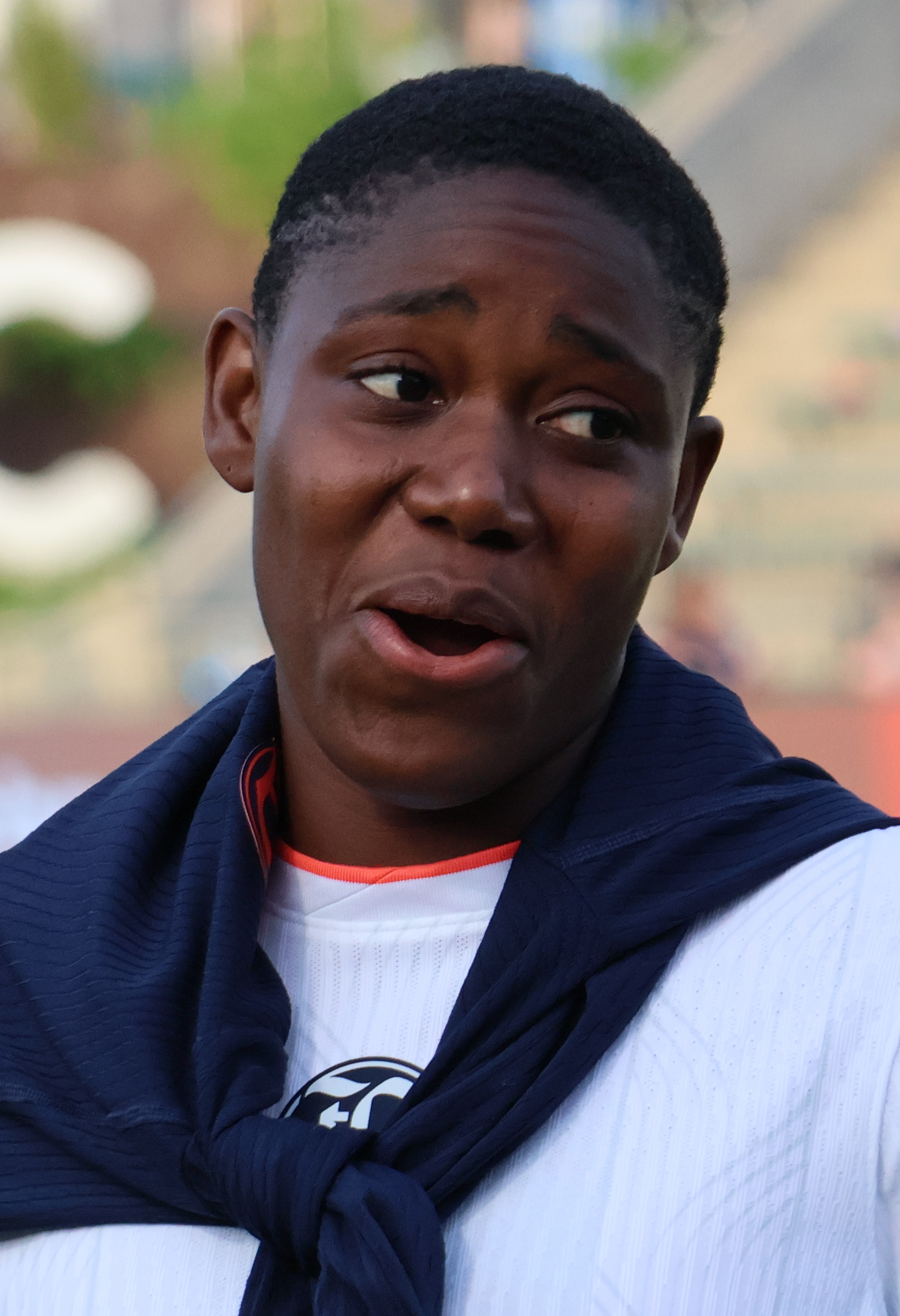
- Oshoala with Bay FC in 2025

Personal information
- Full name: Asisat Lamina Oshoala
- Date of birth: 9 October 1994 (age 32)
- Place of birth: Ikorodu, Nigeria
- Height: 1.73 m (5 ft 8 in)
- Position: Forward

Team information
- Current team: Al Hilal
- Number: 80

Youth career
- Robo

Senior career*
Years	Team	Apps	(Gls)
2009–2013	Robo		
2013–2015	Rivers Angels		(6)
2015–2016	Liverpool	9	(3)
2016–2017	Arsenal	11	(2)
2017–2019	Dalian Quanjian	20	(23)
2019	→ Barcelona (loan)	7	(7)
2019–2024	Barcelona	101	(85)
2024–2025	Bay FC	38	(8)
2025–	Al Hilal	24	(25)

International career^{‡}
2010–2014	Nigeria U20	11	(7)
2013–	Nigeria	74	(40)
Medal record
Women's Football
Representing Nigeria
African Championships
Gold medal – first place	2014 Namibia	Nigeria
Gold medal – first place	2016 Cameroon	Nigeria
Gold medal – first place	2018 Ghana	Nigeria
Gold medal – first place	2024 Morocco	Nigeria
- * Club domestic league appearances and goals ‡ National team caps and goals as of 16 August 2026

Asisat Lamina Oshoala (born 9 October 1994) is a Nigerian professional footballer who plays as a striker for Saudi Women's Premier League club Al Hilal and the Nigeria national team. She is one of the most celebrated African female footballers of all time, having won African Women's Footballer of the Year a record six times.

Oshoala previously played for the English clubs Arsenal and Liverpool, the Chinese club Dalian, and the Nigerian clubs Rivers Angels and FC Robo. She won the 2015 FA Women's Cup with Arsenal, two league championships and a cup title with Dalian, and the 2019–20 Copa de la Reina and the 2019–20 Supercopa de España Femenina with Barcelona. In 2019, she became the first African player to score a goal in a UEFA Women's Champions League final, and in 2021 she became the first African woman to win the UEFA Champions League. The following season, she became the first African woman to win the Primera División's Pichichi Trophy, and in August 2022 she was the first African woman nominated to the Ballon d'Or Féminin. In 2024, Oshoala became the first African player to win the UEFA Champions League three times.

Oshoala was the highest goal scorer at the 2014 FIFA U-20 Women's World Cup and was named the best player at the tournament. She was also named the best player and second highest goal scorer with the Super Falcons team, which won the 2014 African Women's Championship.

In September 2014, Oshoala was made a Member of the Order of the Niger by President of Nigeria Goodluck Jonathan. In 2021, she was named in the Forbes 30 Under 30. She is popularly called "Àgba Baller", which means "Legendary Footballer" in her local parlance. In July 2023, after her performance against Australia in the 2023 FIFA Women's World Cup, Oshoala became the first African female footballer with a million followers on Instagram.

== Early life ==
Oshoala attended Air Force Primary School in Victoria Island, Lagos, and completed secondary school at Aunty Ayo International School in Ikoyi, Lagos. She said her parents were not supportive when she dropped out of school to pursue a football career. Oshoala is a Muslim.

== Club career ==
=== Liverpool ===
On 23 January 2015, Oshoala became the first African player to compete in England's Women's Super League, when she joined Liverpool. The club's manager, Matt Beard, called her "one of the best young players in the world". Despite missing two months of the 2015 season with a knee injury, Oshoala scored three goals in the nine games in which she played. Her first goal of the season was the game-opener of a 2–1 win against Birmingham City on April 1. In January 2016, Liverpool reported that a transfer bid from Arsenal had activated the release clause in Oshoala's contract and that she was in negotiations with the London club.

=== Arsenal ===
In March 2016, Oshoala signed with Arsenal. On 14 May, she helped the club win the 2016 FA Women's Cup Final, which marked Arsenal's 14th title. Oshoala made 13 appearances for the club during the 2016 season and scored two goals, with Arsenal finishing in third place in the league with a 16–4–2 record. (Note: Attributed to multiple references:)

=== Dalian Quanjian ===
On 10 February 2017, Oshoala signed with the Chinese club Dalian (大连女子足球俱乐部). During the 2017 season, she scored 12 goals, helping the club win the league championship. She was awarded the league's Golden Boot award for most goals scored. The same year, she scored four goals during the 2017 Women's Super Cup as Dalian defeated Shanghai 5–3 to win the championship. In October 2018, Dalian won the league championship for the second consecutive year.

=== FC Barcelona ===
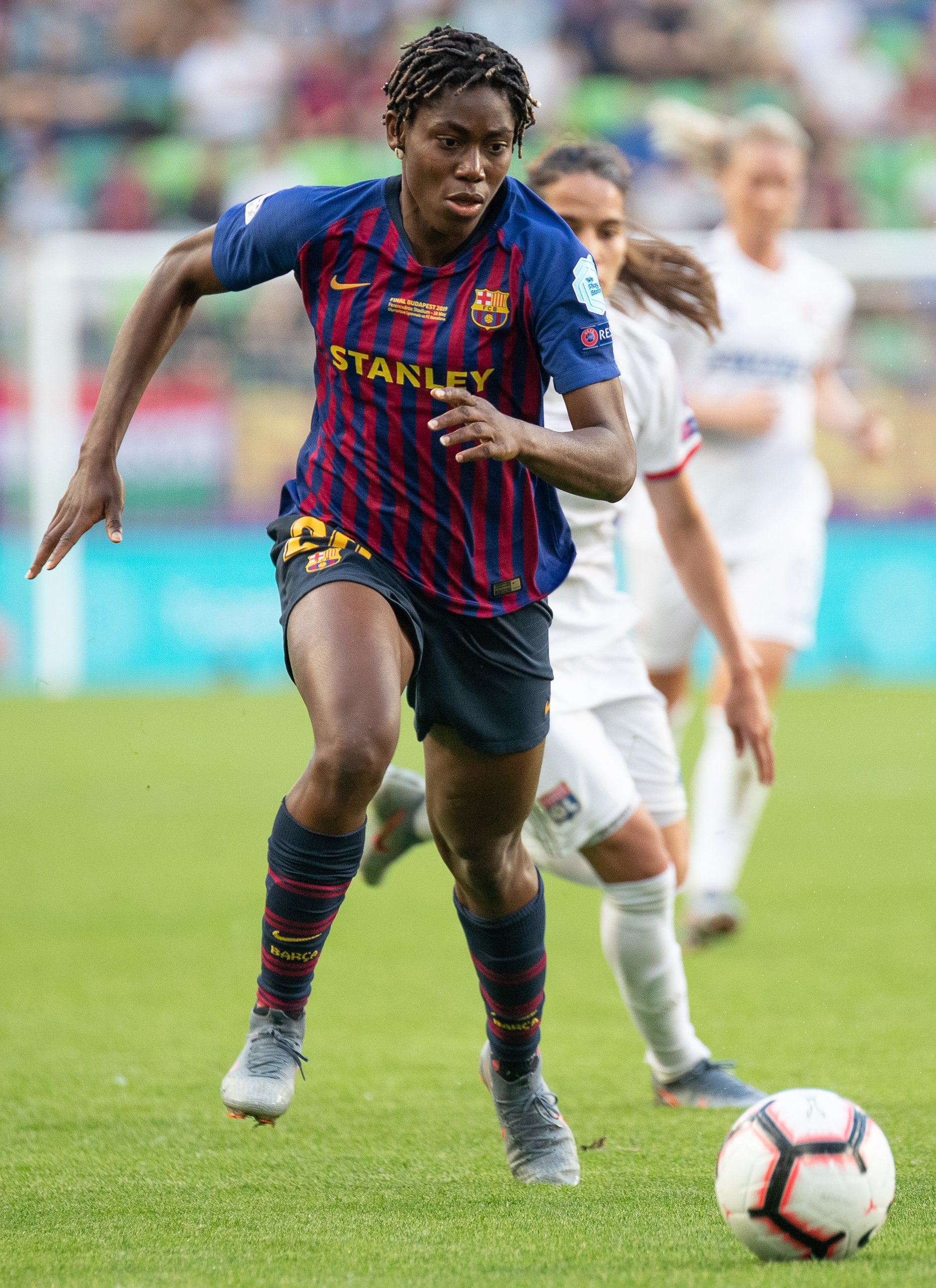
Oshoala dribbles the ball during the 2019 UEFA Women's Champions League Final.

On 31 January 2019, the Spanish club FC Barcelona Femení signed Oshoala on a loan deal until the end of the season. On May 31, Barcelona announced her full transfer to the club and an extension until 2022. Oshoala scored seven goals in her seven appearances for the club during the 2018–19 season. Barcelona finished in second place in Liga F with a 25–2–3 record.

Oshoala scored Barcelona's only goal in a 4–1 defeat to Lyon in the 2019 UEFA Women's Champions League Final, becoming the first African to score in a Champions League Final. During the 2019–20 season, Oshoala scored 20 goals in her 19 appearances for Barcelona, including four goals in a 6–0 win against CD Tacon on January 11, 2020. Barcelona finished in first place during the regular season with an undefeated 19–0–2 record. Oshoala's 20 goals ranked second in the league behind the 23 goals of teammate Jenni Hermoso.

Oshoala scored the game-opening goal in the fourth minute of the 2019–20 Copa de la Reina semi-final against Seville, and also provided two assists as Barcelona achieved a 6–0 win. In the final, Barcelona defeated Logroño 3–0 to win the championship. On 21 August 2020, Oshoala provided the assist for Kheira Hamraoui's game-winning goal in the 2019–20 UEFA Women's Champions League quarter-final against Atlético Madrid.

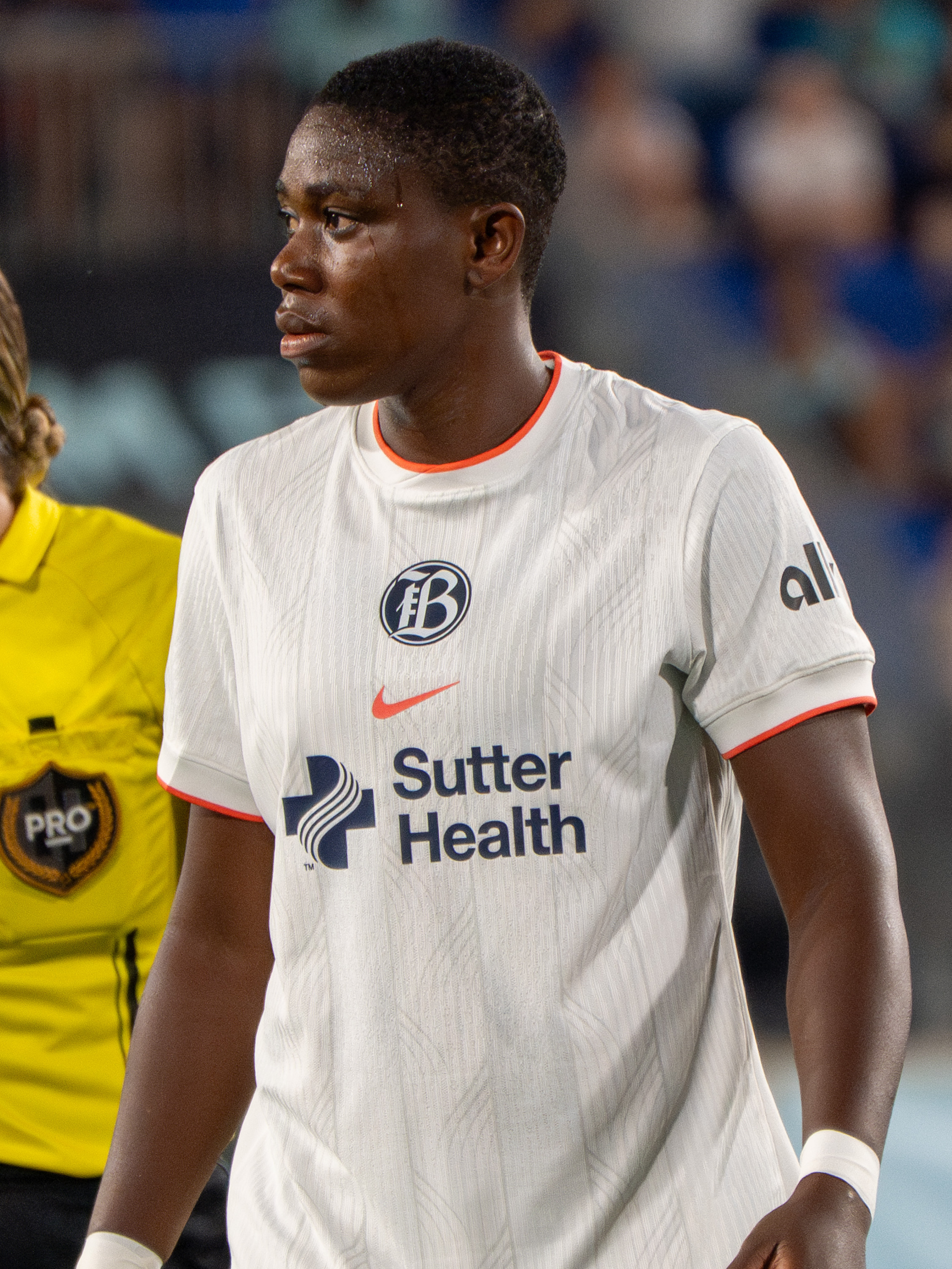
Oshoala with Bay FC in 2025

On 24 March 2021, Oshoala scored the game-winning goal in Barcelona's 3–0 win over Manchester City during the first leg of the 2020–21 Champions League quarterfinals. On 16 May, she became the first African woman to win the UEFA Champions League as Barcelona defeated Chelsea 4–0. On 10 March 2022, Oshoala signed a two-year contract extension that would keep her at Barcelona until 30 June 2024.

During her time at Barcelona, Oshoala made 162 appearances and scored 117 goals, becoming the fourth-highest goalscorer in the club's history. She won 14 trophies, which included two trebles. Having taken part in all competitions of Barcelona's 2023–24 season before leaving at the end of January, she also won the team's quadruple.

=== Bay FC ===
On 1 February 2024, it was announced that Oshoala had joined the U.S. football club Bay FC. (Note: Attributed to multiple references:) In her debut match, Oshoala scored the only goal in Bay FC's 1–0 victory over Angel City.

=== Al Hilal ===
On 2 September 2025, Oshoala signed for the Saudi Women's Premier League club Al Hilal. She scored in her first match with the club against Al Qadasiah. During the 2025 Saudi Women's Premier Challenge Cup – Winter edition, she scored a hat-trick in the quarter-final and another in the semi-final. Al Hilal progressed to the final, where they were defeated by Al-Nassr. At the 2025–26 Saudi Women's Cup, Oshoala again scored a hat-trick in the semi-final, and Al Hilal again lost to Al-Nassr in the final. She finished the season with 24 goals and 6 assists.

== International career ==
In September 2013, Oshoala's club coach Edwin Okon was serving as the Nigeria national team interim manager. He called her up to the senior national team for a friendly against world champions Japan. Oshoala was named as the best player at the 2014 FIFA U-20 Women's World Cup and was the top goalscorer at the tournament with seven goals. She was named the best player and the second top goalscorer with the national squad that won the 2014 African Women's Championship. In September 2014, Oshoala was made a Member of the Order of the Niger by President of Nigeria Goodluck Jonathan. Oshoala won the BBC Women's Footballer of the Year award in 2015.

=== 2015 FIFA Women's World Cup ===
During the 2015 Women's World Cup, Oshoala scored her first World Cup goal in Nigeria's 3–3 draw with Sweden on 8 June. Nigeria was subsequently defeated by Australia and by the United States, and did not advance to the knockout stages. Oshoala was a member of the national squad that won the African Women's Championship in 2016 and 2018. She scored three goals during the 2018 tournament.

=== 2019 FIFA Women's World Cup ===
Oshoala vice-captained the national team at the 2019 Women's World Cup in France. During the team's group stage match against South Korea, Oshoala scored once as Nigeria won 2–0. She was named Player of the Match, and her goal was nominated for Goal of the Tournament by FIFA. Nigeria advanced to the knockout stages, where they were defeated 3–0 by Germany in a controversial match heavily influenced by video assistant referee (VAR).

=== 2022 Women's Africa Cup of Nations ===
Oshoala was called up to the Nigeria squad for the 2022 Women's Africa Cup of Nations. On 16 June 2023, she was included in the 23-player Nigerian squad for the 2023 FIFA Women's World Cup. In Nigeria's group stage game against Australia at the World Cup, Oshoala scored the third goal of the match, which made her the first Nigeria player to score during three consecutive FIFA World Cups, having previously scored in the 2015 and 2019 tournaments. She also became the first African to score during three different FIFA Women's World Cups. (Note: Attributed to multiple references:)

Oshoala was called up to the Nigeria squad for the 2024 Summer Olympics. On 20 June 2025, she was named in the Nigeria squad for the 2024 Women's Africa Cup of Nations.

=== 2026 Women's Africa Cup of Nations ===
During the 2026 edition of the Women's Africa Cup of Nations (WAFCON), Oshoala scored her 15th career WAFCON goal in the eighth minute of Nigeria's 1–0 group-stage victory over Zambia. In Nigeria's final group match, she scored the opening goal of an eventual 6–2 victory over Egypt.

== Style of play ==
Oshoala is known for her explosive pace, strength, and clinical finishing. She combines athleticism with technique, making her one of the most feared forwards in women's football. (Note: Attributed to multiple references:) She thrives in counter-attacking situations, and knows how to time runs behind defenses and position herself well in the box. She is strong in the air, capable of scoring with headers, and is calm and effective in one-on-one situations with goalkeepers. She can play as a central striker or wide forward. (Note: Attributed to multiple references:) Oshoala found success as a forward for Nigeria's youth teams, but made most of her early appearances for the senior national team as an attacking midfielder. She has been given the nicknames "Seedorf"—after the Dutch footballer Clarence Seedorf—and "Superzee". (Note: Attributed to multiple references:)

== Activities off the pitch ==
Oshoala is a brand ambassador for Nike. In 2019, she launched the Asisat Oshoala Foundation, which aims to empower girl footballers in Africa. The foundation hosts the annual Football4girls tournament in Lagos. In 2021, Oshoala was named to the Forbes 30 Under 30, and was appointed to FIFA's technical advisory group on the growth and advancement of women's football. (Note: Attributed to multiple references:)

== Career statistics ==
=== Club ===
Club	Season	Division	League		Cup		Continental		Total	
Club	Season	Division	Apps	Goals	Apps	Goals	Apps	Goals	Apps	Goals
Liverpool	2015-16	Women's Super League	9	3			2	0	9	3
Arsenal	2016-17	Women's Super League	13	2	2	0			15	2
Dalian Quanjian	2017	Chinese Women's Super League	10	12					10	12
Dalian Quanjian	2018	Chinese Women's Super League	8	10					8	10
Dalian Quanjian	2019	Chinese Women's Super League	2	1					2	1
Dalian Quanjian	Total		20	23					20	23
Barcelona	2018-19	Liga F	7	7	1	0	3	1	11	8
Barcelona	2019-20	Liga F	19	20	6	7	5	1	30	28
Barcelona	2020-21	Liga F	26	18	2	0	9	4	37	22
Barcelona	2021-22	Liga F	19	20	3	1	6	1	28	22
Barcelona	2022-23	Liga F	28	21	3	1	9	5	40	27
Barcelona	2023-24	Liga F	9	6	3	1	2	1	14	8
Barcelona	Total		108	92	18	10	34	13	160	115
Bay	2024	NWSL	26	8					26	8
Bay	2025	NWSL	12	0					12	0
Bay	Total		38	8					38	8
Al Hilal	2025-26	Saudi Women's Premier League	14	12	5	6			19	18
Al Hilal	2026-27	Saudi Women's Premier League	3	4	2	2			5	6
Total career			204	144	27	18	36	13	268	175

== International goals ==
Scores and results list Nigeria's goal tally first, score column indicates score after each Oshoala goal.

List of international goals scored by Asisat Oshoala
No.	Date	Venue	Opponent	Score	Result	Competition
1	24 May 2014	Stade Régional Nyamirambo, Kigali, Rwanda	Rwanda	1–0	4–1	2014 African Women's Championship qualification
2	24 May 2014	Stade Régional Nyamirambo, Kigali, Rwanda	Rwanda	2–0	4–1	2014 African Women's Championship qualification
3	7 June 2014	Abuja Stadium, Abuja, Nigeria	Rwanda	2–0	8–0	2014 African Women's Championship qualification
4	7 June 2014	Abuja Stadium, Abuja, Nigeria	Rwanda	7–0	8–0	2014 African Women's Championship qualification
5	14 October 2014	Sam Nujoma Stadium, Windhoek, Namibia	Zambia	5–0	6–0	2014 African Women's Championship
6	22 October 2014	Sam Nujoma Stadium, Windhoek, Namibia	South Africa	1–0	2–1	2014 African Women's Championship
7	22 October 2014	Sam Nujoma Stadium, Windhoek, Namibia	South Africa	2–0	2–1	2014 African Women's Championship
8	25 October 2014	Sam Nujoma Stadium, Windhoek, Namibia	Cameroon	2–0	2–0	2014 African Women's Championship
9	21 March 2015	Abuja Stadium, Abuja, Nigeria	Mali	3−0	8−0	Football at the 2015 African Games – Women's qualification
10	21 March 2015	Abuja Stadium, Abuja, Nigeria	Mali	5−0	8−0	Football at the 2015 African Games – Women's qualification
11	8 June 2015	IG Field, Winnipeg, Canada	Sweden	2–2	3–3	2015 FIFA Women's World Cup
12	20 November 2016	Limbe Stadium, Limbe, Cameroon	Mali	2–0	6–0	2016 African Women's Championship
13	20 November 2016	Limbe Stadium, Limbe, Cameroon	Mali	4–0	6–0	2016 African Women's Championship
14	20 November 2016	Limbe Stadium, Limbe, Cameroon	Mali	5–0	6–0	2016 African Women's Championship
15	20 November 2016	Limbe Stadium, Limbe, Cameroon	Mali	6–0	6–0	2016 African Women's Championship
16	23 November 2016	Limbe Stadium, Limbe, Cameroon	Ghana	1–0	1–1	2016 African Women's Championship
17	26 November 2016	Limbe Stadium, Limbe, Cameroon	Kenya	3–0	4–0	2016 African Women's Championship
18	11 June 2018	Agege Stadium, Lagos, Nigeria	Gambia	2–0	6–0	2018 Women's Africa Cup of Nations qualification
19	11 June 2018	Agege Stadium, Lagos, Nigeria	Gambia	5–0	6–0	2018 Women's Africa Cup of Nations qualification
20	24 November 2018	Cape Coast Sports Stadium, Cape Coast, Ghana	Equatorial Guinea	2–0	6–0	2018 Women's Africa Cup of Nations
21	24 November 2018	Cape Coast Sports Stadium, Cape Coast, Ghana	Equatorial Guinea	3–0	6–0	2018 Women's Africa Cup of Nations
22	24 November 2018	Cape Coast Sports Stadium, Cape Coast, Ghana	Equatorial Guinea	4–0	6–0	2018 Women's Africa Cup of Nations
23	27 February 2019	AEK Arena, Larnaca, Cyprus	Austria	1–2	1–4	2019 Cyprus Women's Cup
24	6 March 2019	Tasos Markos Stadium, Paralimni, Cyprus	Thailand	1–0	3–0	2019 Cyprus Women's Cup
25	12 June 2019	Stade des Alpes, Grenoble, France	South Korea	2–0	2–0	2019 FIFA Women's World Cup
26	3 September 2019	Agege Stadium, Lagos, Nigeria	Algeria	1–0	1–0	2020 CAF Women's Olympic Qualifying Tournament
27	7 October 2019	Agege Stadium, Lagos, Nigeria	Ivory Coast	1–1	1–1	2020 CAF Women's Olympic Qualifying Tournament
28	23 February 2021	Arslan Zeki Demirci Sports Complex, Ilıca, Turkey	Equatorial Guinea	2–0	9–0	2021 Turkish Women's Cup
29	23 February 2021	Arslan Zeki Demirci Sports Complex, Ilıca, Turkey	Equatorial Guinea	3–0	9–0	2021 Turkish Women's Cup
30	23 February 2021	Arslan Zeki Demirci Sports Complex, Ilıca, Turkey	Equatorial Guinea	4–0	9–0	2021 Turkish Women's Cup
31	23 February 2021	Arslan Zeki Demirci Sports Complex, Ilıca, Turkey	Equatorial Guinea	9–0	9–0	2021 Turkish Women's Cup
32	7 April 2023	Marden Sports Complex, Alanya, Turkey	Haiti	2–0	2–1	Friendly
33	27 July 2023	Lang Park, Brisbane, Australia	Australia	3–1	3–2	2023 FIFA Women's World Cup
34	31 October 2023	MKO Abiola Stadium, Abuja, Nigeria	Ethiopia	3–0	4–0	2024 CAF Women's Olympic Qualifying Tournament
35	29 June 2025	Ziaida Sports Complex, Mohammedia, Morocco	Ghana	2–0	3–1	Friendly
36	6 July 2025	Larbi Zaouli Stadium, Casablanca, Morocco	Tunisia	1–0	3–0	2024 Women's Africa Cup of Nations
37	5 June 2026	Remo Stars Stadium, Ikenne, Nigeria	Senegal	1–0	2–1	Friendly
38	8 June 2026	Remo Stars Stadium, Ikenne, Nigeria	Senegal	3–0	3–0	Friendly
39	1 August 2026	Al Medina Stadium, Rabat, Morocco	Zambia	1–0	1–0	2026 Women's Africa Cup of Nations
40	1 August 2026	Al Medina Stadium, Rabat, Morocco	Egypt	1–0	6–2	2026 Women's Africa Cup of Nations

== Honours ==
Rivers Angels

- Nigerian Women's Championship: 2014
- Nigerian Women's Cup: 2013, 2014

Arsenal

- FA Women's Cup: 2015–16

Dalian Quanjian

- Chinese Women's Super League: 2017, 2018

FC Barcelona

- Primera División: 2019–20, 2020–21, 2021–22, 2022–23, 2023–24
- UEFA Women's Champions League: 2020–21, 2022–23
- Supercopa de España Femenina: 2019–20, 2021–22, 2022–23, 2023–24
- Copa de la Reina: 2019–20, 2020–21, 2021–22

Nigeria

- Women's Africa Cup of Nations: 2014, 2016, 2018, 2024
- FIFA U-20 Women's World Cup runner-up: 2014

Individual

- BBC Women's Footballer of the Year: 2015
- African Women's Footballer of the Year: 2014, 2016, 2017, 2019, 2022, 2023
- African Women's Youth Player of the Year: 2014
- African Women's Championship Golden Ball: 2014
- African Women's Championship Golden Boot: 2016
- FIFA U-20 Women's World Cup Golden Boot: 2014
- FIFA U-20 Women's World Cup Golden Ball: 2014
- Primera División Top scorer: 2021–22
- Chinese Women's Super League Top scorer: 2017
- IFFHS CAF Best Woman Player of the Decade 2011–2020
- IFFHS All-time Africa Women's Dream Team: 2021
- IFFHS CAF Women's Team of the Decade: 2011–2020
- IFFHS Women's CAF Best Player of the Year: 2020, 2021
- IFFHS Women's CAF Team of the Year: 2020, 2021, 2023
- Queen of The Pitch Award: 2014
- CAF Team of the Year Women's XI: 2023, 2024

Orders

- Officer of the Order of the Niger

== See also ==
- List of Nigeria women's international footballers
- List of Africa Women Cup of Nations hat-tricks
- List of Yoruba people
- List of FC Barcelona Femení players
