= 2018 Chinese FA Women's Cup =

Tournament details
- Country: China
- Dates: 13 March – 29 September 2018
- Teams: 16

Final positions
- Champions: Jiangsu Suning
- Runners-up: Dalian Quanjian

The 2018 Chinese FA Women's Cup (Chinese: 2018年中国足球协会杯(女子)) was the 12th edition of the Chinese FA Women's Cup.

== Group stage ==
The draw took place on 12 March 2018.

=== Group A ===
Team	Pld	W	D	L	GF	GA	GD	Pts	Qualification
Jiangsu Suning	3	2	1	0	7	0	+7	7	Quarter-Finals
Beijing BG Phoenix	3	2	1	0	8	2	+6	7	Quarter-Finals
Zhejiang	3	1	0	2	4	4	0	3	Qualification to 9th–12th place Play-offs
Hebei Elite	3	0	0	3	1	14	-13	0	Qualification to 13th–16th place Play-offs

13 March 2018	Jiangsu Suning	5–0	Hebei Elite	Haigeng Football Training Base Field 7, Kunming
10:00

13 March 2018	Beijing BG Phoenix	2–1	Zhejiang	Haigeng Football Training Base Field 10, Kunming
10:00

15 March 2018	Jiangsu Suning	2–0	Zhejiang	Haigeng Football Training Base Field 10, Kunming
15:00

15 March 2018	Hebei Elite	1–6	Beijing BG Phoenix	Haigeng Football Training Base Field 7, Kunming
15:00

17 March 2018	Jiangsu Suning	0–0	Beijing BG Phoenix	Haigeng Football Training Base Field 7, Kunming
10:00

17 March 2018	Zhejiang	3–0	Hebei Elite	Haigeng Football Training Base Field 10, Kunming
10:00

=== Group B ===
Team	Pld	W	D	L	GF	GA	GD	Pts	Qualification
Changchun Rural Commercial Bank	3	2	1	0	6	2	+4	7	Quarter-Finals
Shanghai	3	2	0	1	6	3	+3	6	Quarter-Finals
Sichuan	3	0	2	1	1	5	-4	2	Qualification to 9th–12th place Play-offs
Guangdong Meizhou Huijun	3	0	1	2	0	3	-3	1	Qualification to 13th–16th place Play-offs

13 March 2018	Changchun Rural Commercial Bank	2–0	Guangdong Meizhou Huijun	Haigeng Football Training Base Field 3, Kunming
10:00

13 March 2018	Shanghai	4–0	Sichuan	Haigeng Football Training Base Field 4, Kunming
10:00

15 March 2018	Changchun Rural Commercial Bank	1–1	Sichuan	Haigeng Football Training Base Field 4, Kunming
15:00

15 March 2018	Guangdong Meizhou Huijun	0–1	Shanghai	Haigeng Football Training Base Field 3, Kunming
15:00

17 March 2018	Changchun Rural Commercial Bank	3–1	Shanghai	Haigeng Football Training Base Field 3, Kunming
10:00

17 March 2018	Sichuan	0–0	Guangdong Meizhou Huijun	Haigeng Football Training Base Field 4, Kunming
10:00

=== Group C ===
Team	Pld	W	D	L	GF	GA	GD	Pts	Qualification
Wuhan Jianghan University	3	2	0	1	9	2	+7	6	Quarter-Finals
Henan Huishang	3	2	0	1	10	4	+6	6	Quarter-Finals
Shandong Sports Lottery	3	2	0	1	6	2	+4	6	Qualification to 9th–12th place Play-offs
Nei Mongol Hengjun Beilian	3	0	0	3	1	18	-17	0	Qualification to 13th–16th place Play-offs

13 March 2018	Henan Huishang	7–1	Nei Mongol Hengjun Beilian	Haigeng Football Training Base Field 7, Kunming
15:00

13 March 2018	Shandong Sports Lottery	1–0	Wuhan Jianghan University	Haigeng Football Training Base Field 10, Kunming
15:00

15 March 2018	Henan Huishang	1–3	Wuhan Jianghan University	Haigeng Football Training Base Field 10, Kunming
10:00

15 March 2018	Nei Mongol Hengjun Beilian	0–5	Shandong Sports Lottery	Haigeng Football Training Base Field 7, Kunming
10:00

17 March 2018	Henan Huishang	2–0	Shandong Sports Lottery	Haigeng Football Training Base Field 7, Kunming
15:00

17 March 2018	Wuhan Jianghan University	6–0	Nei Mongol Hengjun Beilian	Haigeng Football Training Base Field 10, Kunming
15:00

=== Group D ===
Team	Pld	W	D	L	GF	GA	GD	Pts	Qualification
Dalian Quanjian	3	3	0	0	18	2	+16	9	Quarter-Finals
PLA	3	2	0	1	4	6	-2	6	Quarter-Finals
Hebei China Fortune	3	1	0	2	2	9	-7	3	Qualification to 9th–12th place Play-offs
Shaanxi	3	0	0	3	1	8	-7	0	Qualification to 13th–16th place Play-offs

13 March 2018	Dalian Quanjian	5–1	Shaanxi	Haigeng Football Training Base Field 3, Kunming
15:00

13 March 2018	Hebei China Fortune	0–2	PLA	Haigeng Football Training Base Field 4, Kunming
15:00

15 March 2018	Dalian Quanjian	6–1	PLA	Haigeng Football Training Base Field 4, Kunming
10:00

15 March 2018	Shaanxi	0–2	Hebei China Fortune	Haigeng Football Training Base Field 3, Kunming
10:00

17 March 2018	Dalian Quanjian	7–0	Hebei China Fortune	Haigeng Football Training Base Field 3, Kunming
15:00

17 March 2018	PLA	1–0	Shaanxi	Haigeng Football Training Base Field 4, Kunming
15:00

== Play-offs ==
=== 9th–12th place play-offs ===
19 March 2018	Sichuan	0–2	Shandong Sports Lottery	Haigeng Football Training Base Field 3, Kunming
15:00

19 March 2018	Zhejiang	1–0	Hebei China Fortune	Haigeng Football Training Base Field 4, Kunming
15:00

=== 9th place play-off ===
21 March 2018	Zhejiang	2–0	Shandong Sports Lottery	Haigeng Football Training Base Field 4, Kunming
15:00

=== 11th place play-off ===
21 March 2018	Hebei China Fortune	2–2 (4–5 p)	Sichuan	Haigeng Football Training Base Field 3, Kunming
15:00

=== 13th–16th place play-offs ===
19 March 2018	Guangdong Meizhou Huijun	10–0	Nei Mongol Hengjun Beilian	Haigeng Football Training Base Field 7, Kunming
10:00

19 March 2018	Hebei Elite	2–4	Shaanxi	Haigeng Football Training Base Field 10, Kunming
10:00

=== 13th place play-off ===
21 March 2018	Shaanxi	0–2	Guangdong Meizhou Huijun	Haigeng Football Training Base Field 10, Kunming
10:00

=== 15th place play-off ===
21 March 2018	Hebei Elite	3–0	Nei Mongol Hengjun Beilian	Haigeng Football Training Base Field 7, Kunming
10:00

== Quarter-finals ==
=== 1st leg ===
23 June 2018	Henan Huishang	1–3	Changchun Rural Commercial Bank	Luoyang Stadium, Luoyang
16:00				Referee: Mou Mingxin

23 June 2018	Wuhan Jianghan University	1–5	Beijing BG Phoenix	Tazi Lake Sports Centre Field 1, Wuhan
16:00				Referee: Tong Dan

23 June 2018	Shanghai	1–3	Dalian Quanjian	Stadium of Baoshan Campus, Shanghai University, Shanghai
16:00				Referee: Dai Bingyue

23 June 2018	PLA	0–3; Cancelled (Note: Jiangsu Suning was awarded a 3–0 win as a result of PLA forfeited due to their participation in the 2018 World Women's Military Championship.)	Jiangsu Suning
16:00

=== 2nd leg ===
12 September 2018	Changchun Rural Commercial Bank	3–0	Henan Huishang	Development Area Stadium, Changchun
15:00				Referee: Chang Xinxin

Changchun Rural Commercial Bank won 6–1 on aggregate.

12 September 2018	Beijing BG Phoenix	0–0	Wuhan Jianghan University	Xiannongtan Stadium, Beijing
15:00

Beijing BG Phoenix won 5–1 on aggregate.

12 September 2018	Dalian Quanjian	2–0	Shanghai	Dalian Sports Center Stadium, Dalian
15:00				Referee: Chen Yuan

Dalian Quanjian won 5–1 on aggregate.

12 September 2018	Jiangsu Suning	3–0; Cancelled	PLA
15:00

== 5th–8th place play-offs ==
=== 1st leg ===
19 September 2018	PLA	0–0	Henan Huishang	Huizhou Olympic Stadium, Huizhou
15:00				Referee: Shi Yingying

19 September 2018	Wuhan Jianghan University	2–1	Shanghai	Tazi Lake Sports Centre Field 1, Wuhan
15:00

=== 2nd leg ===
17 October 2018	Henan Huishang	1–0	PLA	Luoyang Stadium, Luoyang
15:00				Referee: Chang Xinxin

Henan Huishang won 1–0 on aggregate.

17 October 2018	Shanghai	5–0	Wuhan Jianghan University	Stadium of Baoshan Campus, Shanghai University, Shanghai
15:00

Shanghai won 6–2 on aggregate.

== Semi-finals ==
=== 1st leg ===
19 September 2018	Changchun Rural Commercial Bank	1–3	Jiangsu Suning	Development Area Stadium, Changchun
15:00				Referee: Dai Bingyue

19 September 2018	Beijing BG Phoenix	1–1	Dalian Quanjian	Xiannongtan Stadium, Beijing
15:00				Referee: Mou Mingxin

=== 2nd leg ===
17 October 2018	Jiangsu Suning	2–0	Changchun Rural Commercial Bank	Wutaishan Stadium, Nanjing
15:00				Referee: Nie Wenwen

Jiangsu Suning won 5–1 on aggregate.

17 October 2018	Dalian Quanjian	2–0	Beijing BG Phoenix	Dalian Sports Center Stadium, Dalian
15:00				Referee: Dai Bingyue

Dalian Quanjian won 3–1 on aggregate.

== 7th–8th place play-offs ==
=== 1st leg ===
24 October 2018	PLA	0–2	Wuhan Jianghan University
15:00

=== 2nd leg ===
3 November 2018	Wuhan Jianghan University	1–0	PLA
15:00

Wuhan Jianghan University won 3–0 on aggregate.

== 5th–6th place play-offs ==
=== 1st leg ===
24 October 2018	Shanghai	3–1	Henan Huishang	Stadium of Baoshan Campus, Shanghai University, Shanghai
15:00				Referee: Mou Mingxin

=== 2nd leg ===
3 November 2018	Henan Huishang	1–3	Shanghai
15:00

Shanghai won 6–2 on aggregate.

== 3rd–4th place play-offs ==
=== 1st leg ===
24 October 2018	Beijing BG Phoenix	2–2	Changchun Rural Commercial Bank	Xiannongtan Stadium, Beijing
15:00				Referee: Chen Yuan

=== 2nd leg ===
3 November 2018	Changchun Rural Commercial Bank	2–1	Beijing BG Phoenix
15:00

Changchun Rural Commercial Bank won 4–3 on aggregate.

== Finals ==
=== 1st leg ===
24 October 2018	Dalian Quanjian	0–4	Jiangsu Suning	Dalian Sports Center Stadium, Dalian
15:00				Referee: Dai Bingyue

=== 2nd leg ===
3 November 2018	Jiangsu Suning	3–0	Dalian Quanjian
15:00

Jiangsu Suning won 7–0 on aggregate.
