= 2021 Turkish Women's Cup =

Festival Women's Trophy

Tournament details
- Host country: Turkey
- Dates: 17–23 February
- Teams: 4 (from 3 confederations)
- Venue: 1 (in 1 host city)

Final positions
- Champions: Nigeria (1st title)
- Runners-up: Uzbekistan
- Third place: (Russia) CSKA Moscow
- Fourth place: Equatorial Guinea

Tournament statistics
- Matches played: 6
- Goals scored: 19 (3.17 per match)
- Top scorer(s): (Nigeria) Asisat Oshoala (4 goals)

The 2021 Turkish Women's Cup, also named Festival Women's Trophy 2021, was the fifth edition of the Turkish Women's Cup, an invitational women's football tournament held annually in Turkey. It took place between 17 and 23 February in Antalya. Originally, there were to be two separate, unconnected tournaments involving four teams each. However, because of inadequate documentation, the second tournament that had been announced (involving India, Serbia, Russia and Ukraine) became simply a series of friendly matches.

== Teams ==
Team	FIFA Rankings (December 2020)
Nigeria	37
Uzbekistan	41
Equatorial Guinea	NR
~~Zambia~~ (Note: Zambia withdrew from the competition and was replaced by CSKA Moscow.)	95
(Russia) CSKA Moscow	—N/a
Serbia (Note: Played friendlies, not part of the tournament group stage)	40
Russia	23
Ukraine	24
India	53

== Group Stage ==
Pos	Team	Pld	W	D	L	GF	GA	GD	Pts
1	Nigeria	3	3	0	0	11	0	+11	9
2	Uzbekistan	3	2	0	1	6	1	+5	6
3	(Russia) CSKA Moscow	3	1	0	2	2	2	0	3
4	Equatorial Guinea	3	0	0	3	0	16	−16	0

Rules for classification: 1) Points; 2) Goal difference; 3) Goals scored

All times are local (UTC+3).

17 February 2021
19:00

Equatorial Guinea	0–5	Uzbekistan
	Report	Kudratova 21', 25'; Shoyimova 23'; Khabibullaeva 29'; Narbekova 74'

Arslan Zeki Demirci Sports Complex, Ilıca
18 February 2021
10:30

Nigeria	1–0	(Russia) CSKA Moscow
Ihezuo 18'	Report

Arslan Zeki Demirci Sports Complex, Ilıca

20 February 2021
16:00

Equatorial Guinea	0–2	(Russia) CSKA Moscow
	Report	Yakovleva 29'; Kozyrenko 77'

Arslan Zeki Demirci Sports Complex, Ilıca
20 February 2021
19:00

Nigeria	1–0	Uzbekistan
Ayinde 51'	Report

Arslan Zeki Demirci Sports Complex, Ilıca

23 February 2021
11:00

Nigeria	9–0	Equatorial Guinea
Ogbonna 9'; Oshoala 12' (pen.), 13' (pen.), 26', 85'; Kanu 36'; Adule 39'; Payne 43'; Monday 70'	Report

Arslan Zeki Demirci Sports Complex, Ilıca
23 February 2021
13:00

Uzbekistan	1–0	(Russia) CSKA Moscow
Kudratova 13'	Report

Arslan Zeki Demirci Sports Complex, Ilıca

== Goalscorers ==
There were 19 goals scored in 6 matches, for an average of 3.17 goals per match.

4 goals

- (Nigeria) Asisat Oshoala

3 goals

- (Uzbekistan) Nilufar Kudratova

1 goal

- (Nigeria) Charity Adule
- (Nigeria) Halimatu Ayinde
- (Nigeria) Chinwendu Ihezuo
- (Nigeria) Uchenna Kanu
- (Nigeria) Gift Monday
- (Nigeria) Glory Ogbonna
- (Nigeria) Toni Payne
- (Russia) Tetyana Kozyrenko
- (Russia) Darya Yakovleva
- (Uzbekistan) Diyorakhon Khabibullaeva
- (Uzbekistan) Lianna Narbekova
- (Uzbekistan) Maftuna Shoyimova

== Friendlies ==
All times are local (UTC+3).

20 February 2021
13:00

Ukraine	1–1	Serbia
Ovdiychuk 44'	Report	Poljak 72'

Gold City Sports Complex, Kargıcak, Turkey
20 February 2021
14:00

Russia	8–0	India
Morina 3', 40'; Chernomyrdina 15' (pen.); Sheina 42'; Korovkina 46', 56', 62'; M. Linthoi Devi 84' (o.g.)	Report

Gold City Sports Complex, Kargıcak, Turkey

23 February 2021
13:00

India	2–3	Ukraine
Xaxa 14'; Manisha 31'	Report	Kozlova 42'; Apanashchenko 62' (pen.), 90+3'

Gold City Sports Complex, Kargıcak, Turkey
23 February 2021
14:00

Serbia	2–0	Russia
Poljak 24'; Stanković 90+2'	Report

Gold City Sports Complex, Kargıcak, Turkey
