= 2017 Chinese Women's Football Championship =

Tournament details
- Dates: 18 February – 1 March
- Teams: 16

Final positions
- Champions: Shanghai (7th title)
- Runners-up: Changchun Rural Commercial Bank
- Third place: Hebei China Fortune
- Fourth place: Beijing Enterprise Phoenix

Tournament statistics
- Matches played: 48
- Goals scored: 116 (2.42 per match)

The 2017 Chinese Women's Football Championship (Chinese: 2017年中国女子足球锦标赛) was the 27th edition of the Chinese Women's Football Championship. Shanghai won their 7th title after beating Changchun Rural Commercial Bank 2–0 in the final.

== Results ==
=== Group stage ===
==== Group A ====
Team	Pld	W	D	L	GF	GA	GD	Pts	Qualification
Beijing Enterprise Phoenix	3	2	1	0	2	0	+2	7	Qualification to Championship Playoffs
Shandong Sports Lottery	3	2	0	1	3	1	+2	6	Qualification to Championship Playoffs
Zhejiang Lander	3	1	0	2	2	2	0	3	Qualification to 9th–16th-place play-offs
Sichuan	3	0	1	2	0	4	-4	1	Qualification to 9th–16th-place play-offs

18 February
Beijing Enterprise Phoenix	0–0	Sichuan	Haigeng Training Base, Kunming
Shandong Sports Lottery	1–0	Zhejiang Lander	Haigeng Training Base, Kunming
20 February
Beijing Enterprise Phoenix	1–0	Zhejiang Lander	Haigeng Training Base, Kunming
Sichuan	0–2	Shandong Sports Lottery	Haigeng Training Base, Kunming
22 February
Beijing Enterprise Phoenix	1–0	Shandong Sports Lottery	Haigeng Training Base, Kunming
Zhejiang Lander	2–0	Sichuan	Haigeng Training Base, Kunming

==== Group B ====
Team	Pld	W	D	L	GF	GA	GD	Pts	Qualification
Wuhan Jianghan University	3	1	2	0	2	1	+1	5	Qualification to Championship Playoffs
Changchun Rural Commercial Bank	3	1	2	0	2	1	+1	5	Qualification to Championship Playoffs
Henan Huishang	3	0	2	1	1	2	-1	2	Qualification to 9th–16th-place play-offs
Shaanxi	3	0	2	1	1	2	-1	2	Qualification to 9th–16th-place play-offs

18 February
Changchun Rural Commercial Bank	1–1	Shaanxi	Haigeng Training Base, Kunming
Wuhan Jianghan University	1–1	Henan Huishang	Haigeng Training Base, Kunming
20 February
Changchun Rural Commercial Bank	1–0	Henan Huishang	Haigeng Training Base, Kunming
Shaanxi	0–1	Wuhan Jianghan University	Haigeng Training Base, Kunming
22 February
Changchun Rural Commercial Bank	0–0	Wuhan Jianghan University	Haigeng Training Base, Kunming
Henan Huishang	0–0	Shaanxi	Haigeng Training Base, Kunming

==== Group C ====
Team	Pld	W	D	L	GF	GA	GD	Pts	Qualification
Jiangsu Suning	3	3	0	0	17	0	+17	9	Qualification to Championship Playoffs
Shanghai	3	2	0	1	11	2	+9	6	Qualification to Championship Playoffs
Tianjin Huisen	3	1	0	2	7	3	+4	3	Qualification to 9th–16th-place play-offs
Nei Mongol Hengjun Beilian	3	0	0	3	0	30	-30	0	Qualification to 9th–16th-place play-offs

18 February
Tianjin Huisen	7–0	Nei Mongol Hengjun Beilian	Haigeng Training Base, Kunming
Jiangsu Suning	2–0	Shanghai	Haigeng Training Base, Kunming
20 February
Tianjin Huisen	0–2	Shanghai	Haigeng Training Base, Kunming
Nei Mongol Hengjun Beilian	0–14	Jiangsu Suning	Haigeng Training Base, Kunming
22 February
Tianjin Huisen	0–1	Jiangsu Suning	Haigeng Training Base, Kunming
Shanghai	9–0	Nei Mongol Hengjun Beilian	Haigeng Training Base, Kunming

==== Group D ====
Team	Pld	W	D	L	GF	GA	GD	Pts	Qualification
Hebei China Fortune	3	2	1	0	4	1	+3	7	Qualification to championship playoffs
PLA	3	1	2	0	2	1	+1	5	Qualification to championship playoffs
Dalian Quanjian	3	1	0	2	3	4	-1	3	Qualification to 9th–16th-place play-offs
Guangdong Suoka	3	0	1	2	2	5	-3	1	Qualification to 9th–16th-place play-offs

18 February
Dalian Quanjian	0–1	PLA	Haigeng Training Base, Kunming
Hebei China Fortune	2–0	Guangdong Suoka	Haigeng Training Base, Kunming
20 February
Dalian Quanjian	2–1	Guangdong Suoka	Haigeng Training Base, Kunming
PLA	0–0	Guangdong Suoka	Haigeng Training Base, Kunming
22 February
Dalian Quanjian	1–2	Hebei China Fortune	Haigeng Training Base, Kunming
Guangdong Suoka	1–1	PLA	Haigeng Training Base, Kunming

=== Play-offs ===
==== 9th–16th-place play-offs ====
===== First round =====
25 February

Zhejiang Lander	0–0	Guangdong Suoka
Penalties
	5–3

Haigeng Training Base, Kunming
25 February

Tianjin Huisen	1–1	Shaanxi
Penalties
	5–4

Haigeng Training Base, Kunming
25 February

Henan Huishang	5–0	Nei Mongol Hengjun Beilian

Haigeng Training Base, Kunming
25 February

Dalian Quanjian	2–0	Sichuan

Haigeng Training Base, Kunming

===== Second round =====
9th–12th place

27 February

Zhejiang Lander	2–0	Henan Huishang

Haigeng Training Base, Kunming
27 February

Tianjin Huisen	1–5	Dalian Quanjian

Haigeng Training Base, Kunming

13th–16th place

27 February

Guangdong Suoka	4–0	Nei Mongol Hengjun Beilian

Haigeng Training Base, Kunming
27 February

Shaanxi	1–2	Sichuan

Haigeng Training Base, Kunming

===== Third round =====
9th-place play-off

1 March

Zhejiang Lander	1–3	Dalian Quanjian

Haigeng Training Base, Kunming

11th-place play-off

1 March

Henan Huishang	2–0	Tianjin Huisen

Haigeng Training Base, Kunming

13th-place play-off

1 March

Guangdong Suoka	2–2	Sichuan
Penalties
	2–4

Haigeng Training Base, Kunming

15th-place play-off

1 March

Nei Mongol Hengjun Beilian	0–1	Shaanxi

Haigeng Training Base, Kunming

==== Championship Playoffs ====
===== First round =====
25 February

Beijing Enterprise Phoenix	1–0	PLA

Haigeng Training Base, Kunming
25 February

Hebei China Fortune	1–1	Shandong Sports Lottery
Penalties
	3–2

Haigeng Training Base, Kunming
25 February

Wuhan Jianghan University	0–1	Shanghai

Haigeng Training Base, Kunming
25 February

Jiangsu Suning	0–1	Changchun Rural Commercial Bank

Haigeng Training Base, Kunming

===== Second round =====
Semi-finals

27 February

Beijing Enterprise Phoenix	2–5	Shanghai

Haigeng Training Base, Kunming
27 February

Changchun Rural Commercial Bank	2–0	Hebei China Fortune

Haigeng Training Base, Kunming

5th–8th place

27 February

PLA	0–0	Wuhan Jianghan University
Penalties
	1–3

Haigeng Training Base, Kunming
27 February

Jiangsu Suning	1–1	Shandong Sports Lottery
Penalties
	4–3

Haigeng Training Base, Kunming

===== Third round =====
3rd-place play-off

1 March

Beijing Enterprise Phoenix	0–1	Hebei China Fortune

Haigeng Training Base, Kunming

5th-place play-off

1 March

Wuhan Jianghan University	0–3	Jiangsu Suning

Haigeng Training Base, Kunming

7th-place play-off

1 March

PLA	0–0	Shandong Sports Lottery
Penalties
	3–2

Haigeng Training Base, Kunming

===== Final =====
1 March
15:00

Shanghai	2–0	Changchun Rural Commercial Bank
Xiao Yuyi 42'; Yang Lina 84'

Haigeng Training Base, Kunming

== Final standings ==
R	Team	G	P	W	D	L	GF	GA	GD	Pts.
1	Shanghai	C	6	5	0	1	19	4	+15	15
2	Changchun Rural Commercial Bank	B	6	3	2	1	5	3	+2	11
3	Hebei China Fortune	D	6	3	2	1	6	4	+2	11
4	Beijing Enterprise Phoenix	A	6	3	1	2	5	6	-1	10
5	Jiangsu Suning	C	6	4	1	1	21	2	+19	13
6	Wuhan Jianghan University	B	6	1	3	2	2	5	-3	6
7	PLA	D	6	1	4	1	2	2	0	7
8	Shandong Sports Lottery	A	6	2	3	1	5	3	+2	9
9	Dalian Quanjian	D	6	4	0	2	13	6	+7	12
10	Zhejiang Lander	A	6	2	1	3	5	5	0	7
11	Henan Huishang	B	6	2	2	2	8	4	+4	8
12	Tianjin Huisen	C	6	1	1	4	9	11	-2	4
13	Sichuan	A	6	1	2	3	4	9	-5	5
14	Guangdong Suoka	D	6	1	3	2	8	7	+1	6
15	Shaanxi	B	6	1	3	2	4	5	-1	6
16	Nei Mongol Hengjun Beilian	C	6	0	0	6	0	40	-40	0
