= Bi Xiaolin =

Chinese footballer

Personal information
- Date of birth: 18 September 1989 (age 37)
- Place of birth: China
- Height: 1.76 m (5 ft 9 in)
- Position: Goalkeeper

Senior career*
| Years | Team | Apps | (Gls) |
| -2021 | Dalian | 1 | (0) |
| 2021-2023 | Changchun Public Execellence | 27 | (4) |

International career^{‡}
| 2017– | China | 8 | (0) |
Medal record
Women's football
Representing China
Asian Games
| Silver medal – second place | 2018 Palembang | Team |
- * Club domestic league appearances and goals as of 7 June 2019 ‡ National team caps and goals as of 7 June 2019

Bi Xiaolin (Chinese: 毕晓琳; born 18 September 1989) is a Chinese footballer currently playing as a goalkeeper.

== Career statistics ==
=== International ===
As of matches played 7 June 2019.

| National team | Year | Apps | Goals |
|---|---|---|---|
| China | 2017 | 5 | 0 |
| China | 2018 | 1 | 0 |
| China | 2019 | 2 | 0 |
| Total | | 8 | 0 |

== Honours ==
China

- Asian Games silver medalist: 2018
