= Fabiana (footballer) =

Brazilian footballer (born 1989)

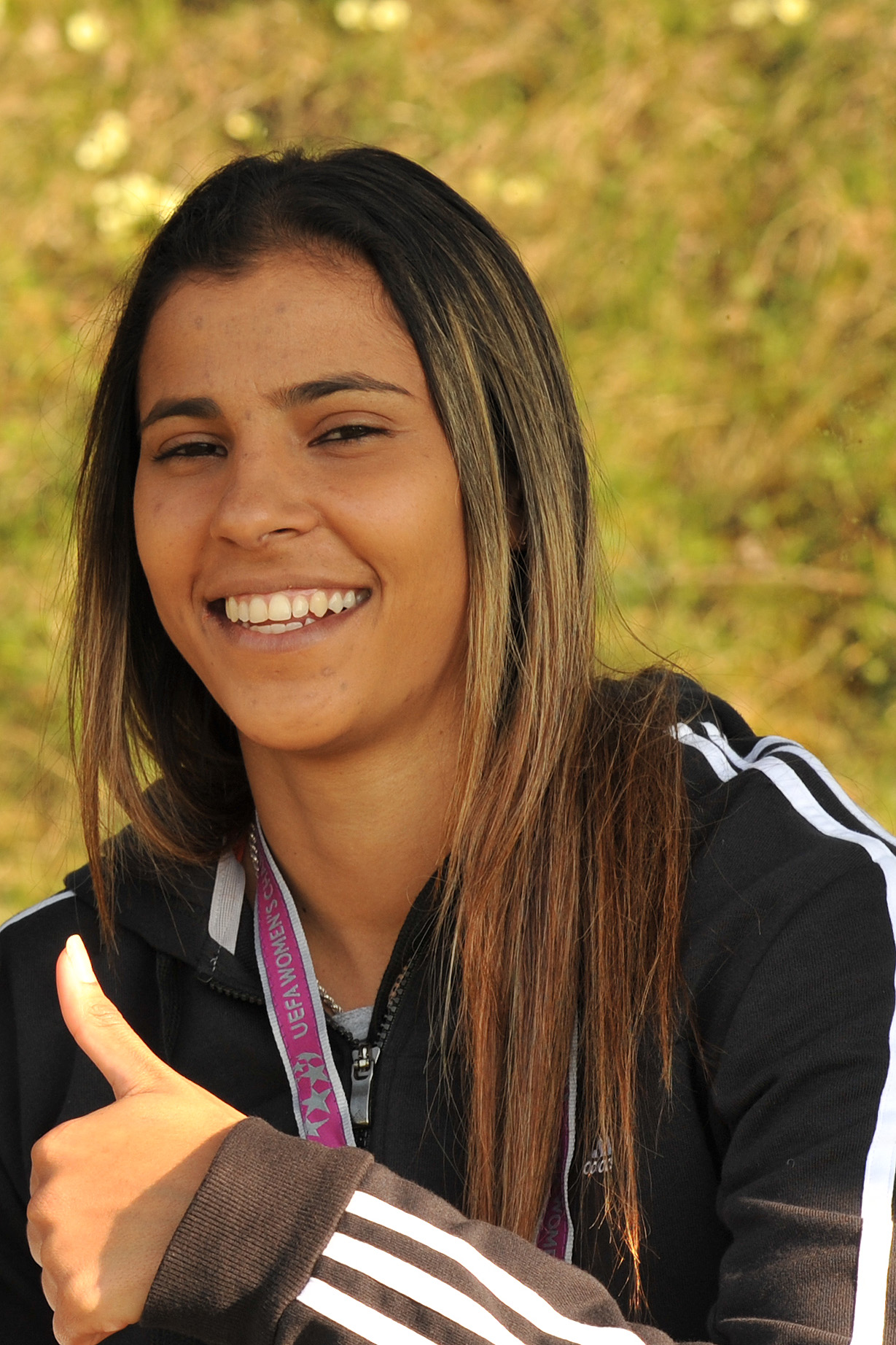
- Fabiana in 2014

Personal information
- Full name: Fabiana da Silva Simões
- Date of birth: 4 August 1989 (age 37)
- Place of birth: Salvador, Brazil
- Height: 1.63 m (5 ft 4 in)
- Position: Right back

Team information
- Current team: Flamengo
- Number: 7

Senior career*
Years	Team	Apps	(Gls)
2006	America-RJ		
2007	CEPE-Caxias		
2007–2008	Sporting de Huelva		
2008	Corinthians		
2009–2010	Boston Breakers	28	(1)
2009	→ Boston Aztec (loan)	2	(0)
2011	Santos		
2011–2013	WFC Rossiyanka	18	(4)
2013	São José	3	(0)
2014	Tyresö FF	0	(0)
2014–2016	Centro Olímpico		
2016–2017	Dalian Quanjian		
2017–2018	Barcelona	9	(1)
2019–2022	Internacional	56	(14)
2023	Santos	16	(1)
2024-	Flamengo	10	(1)

International career^{‡}
2006–2019	Brazil	89	(8)
Medal record
Women's football
Representing Brazil
Olympic Games
Silver medal – second place	2008 Beijing	Team
Pan American Games
Gold medal – first place	2015 Toronto	Team
- * Club domestic league appearances and goals as of 14:06, 13 November 2023 (UTC) ‡ National team caps and goals as of 13 December 2019

Fabiana da Silva Simões (born 4 August 1989), known as Fabiana, Fabi Simões or Fabiana Baiana, (Note: By adding the demonym of Bahia, her home state) is a Brazilian footballer who plays for Flamengo. Mainly a right back, she can also play as a right winger.

From 2009 to 2010, Fabiana played in the United States for the Boston Breakers of Women's Professional Soccer (WPS). As well as teams in her native Brazil, Fabiana has played for Barcelona and Sporting de Huelva of Spain's Primera División and WFC Rossiyanka of the Russian Top Division.

Fabiana has represented the Brazil women's national team since her debut in November 2006 and won a silver medal at the 2008 Beijing Olympics. She retained her national team place for the 2011 FIFA Women's World Cup in Germany, the 2012 London Olympics and the 2015 FIFA Women's World Cup in Canada. A right-sided attacking player noted for her pace and skill, Fabiana can also function as an overlapping right back.

== Club career ==
Fabiana's career began aged 15, when she moved from Bahia to Rio to play for the women's section of America RJ. After a brief spell at CEPE-Caxias, she was signed by Spanish relegation-battlers Sporting de Huelva.

In the 2008 WPS International Draft, Fabiana was selected by Boston Breakers. The US club's coach Tony DiCicco picked England's Kelly Smith in the first round and Fabiana in the second. DiCicco described his Brazilian acquisition as: "very fast and fits that quick Brazilian mold with lot of flair".

An existing anterior cruciate ligament injury sustained while playing for Corinthians kept Fabiana out of the Breakers' team until the last seven games of 2009, all of which she started. Two games on loan to Boston Aztec in the Women's Premier Soccer League (WPSL) had formed part of Fabiana's recuperation. She was given another contract for 2010 and started 14 of her 21 appearances, adding a goal against Chicago Red Stars. Ahead of season 2011, Boston made Fabiana a free agent, then made an unsuccessful attempt to sign her on reduced terms.

In August 2011 she joined Russian UEFA Women's Champions League contestant WFC Rossiyanka from Santos. After another brief return to Brazil with São José, Fabiana transferred to Tyresö FF in January 2014, one of four Brazilians joining their compatriot Marta at the Swedish club. Tyresö were insolvent and on 9 April 2014 the Swedish immigration bureau refused Fabiana a work permit, so she returned to Brazil. She played for Centro Olímpico until 2016, at which point she signed with Chinese Women's Super League club Dalian Quanjian F.C. with two Brazilian teammates. The club would go on to win the 2016 Chinese Women's Super League championship, with Fabiana scoring the game-winning goal and assisting in a second goal during the match to clinch the title.

Fabiana had a successful four-year career with Internacional, where she scored 47 goals in 86 games and acquired the nickname "Gre-Nal Woman" due to scoring nine goals in 11 derby games against Grêmio. She left Internacional in December 2022 when the club offered her a new contract with a 30% reduction in salary.

On 7 January 2023, Fabiana returned to Santos after nearly 12 years.

== International career ==
At the 2006 FIFA U-20 Women's World Championship, FIFA.com reported that Fabiana contributed vital "skill and speed" to the Brazilian team which finished third. In November 2006 Fabiana made her senior international debut in Brazil's 2–0 South American Women's Football Championship win over Peru at Estadio José María Minella, Mar del Plata.

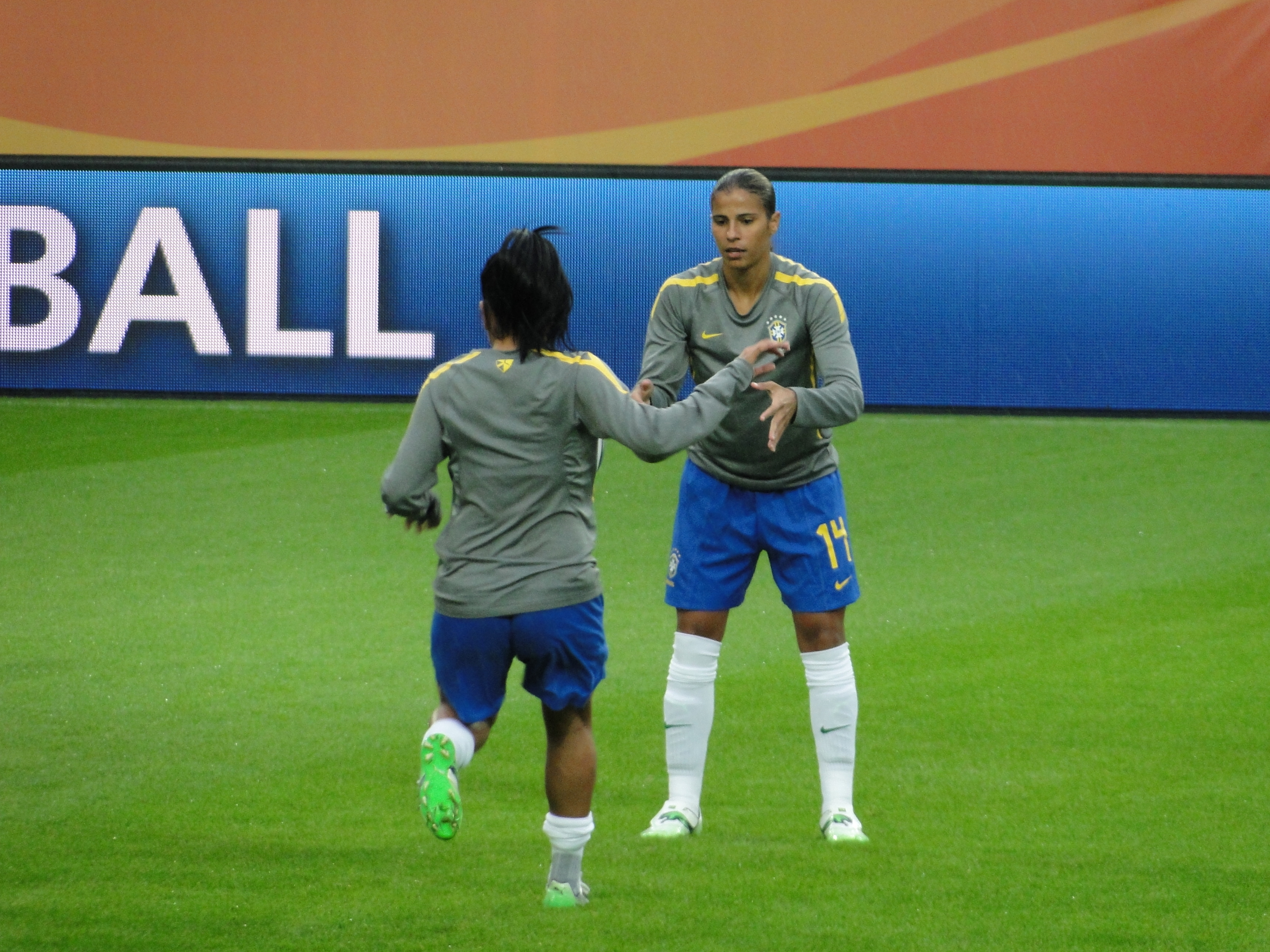
Fabiana (R) at the 2011 FIFA Women's World Cup in Germany

She trained with the senior team ahead of the 2007 Pan American Games, but was not selected for the final squad. Good form with Corinthians saw Fabiana break into the squad ahead of the 2008 Summer Olympics. She was restored to the team for a 2–1 win over Italy at Suwon Sports Complex in the 2008 Peace Queen Cup.

Fabiana was included in Brazil's 18-player squad for the 2008 Beijing Olympics and made substitute appearances in the semi-final and final. She won a silver medal when Brazil lost the final 1–0 after extra time to the United States.

At the 2011 FIFA Women's World Cup in Germany, Fabiana's Brazil beat Australia, Norway and Equatorial Guinea to qualify in first place from their group. They then lost a controversial quarter-final on penalties to the United States after a 2–2 draw.

Fabiana went to her second Olympic football tournament at London 2012. Amidst allegations of a broken down bus plot, Brazil lost their final group E game 1–0 to hosts Great Britain before a record crowd of 70,584 at Wembley Stadium. Fabiana had been dropped from the team for the Great Britain match. The defeat consigned Brazil to a quarter-final meeting with World Cup holders Japan, who knocked Brazil out by winning 2–0 at Cardiff's Millennium Stadium.

In February 2015 Fabiana was included in an 18-month residency programme intended to prepare the national team for the 2015 FIFA Women's World Cup and the 2016 Rio Olympics. At the World Cup in Canada, Fabiana played in all four of Brazil's games as the team was eliminated after a 1–0 defeat by Australia in the second round.

Fabiana was named in Brazil's initial squad for the 2019 FIFA Women's World Cup, but suffered a thigh injury in the pre-tournament training camp. She withdrew from the squad and was replaced by Poliana.

=== International goals ===
Goal	Date	Location	Opponent	#	Score	Result	Competition
goal 1	2011-12-11	São Paulo, Brazil	Chile	1.1	4–0	4–0	Torneio Internacional 2011
goal 2	2012-12-09	São Paulo, Brazil	Portugal	1.1	2–0	4–0	Torneio Internacional 2012
goal 3	2012-12-19	São Paulo, Brazil	Denmark	1.1	2–0	2–2	Torneio Internacional 2012
goal 4	2013-09-25	Savièse, Switzerland	Mexico	1.1	1–0	4–0	Valais Cup 2013
goal 5	2014-09-12	Loja, Ecuador	Bolivia	1.1	6–0	6–0	Copa America 2014
goal 6	2014-09-14	Loja, Ecuador	Paraguay	1.1	4–1	1–4	Copa America 2014
goal 7	2015-07-25	Toronto, Canada	Colombia	1.1	4–0	4–0	2015 Pan American Games
goal 8	2017-09-19	Melbourne, Australia	Australia	1.1	1–0	2–3	Friendly

== Honors ==
=== Individual ===
- IFFHS CONMEBOL Woman Team of the Decade 2011–2020
