= Dongfeng Renault =

Joint-venture car company

Dongfeng Renault Automobile Company
- Type: Joint venture
- Industry: Automotive
- Predecessor: Sanjiang Renault Automotive Company
- Founded: 1993 (as Sanjiang Renault); 16 December 2013 (as Dongfeng Renault)
- Defunct: 28 August 2020
- Successor: Dongfeng Motor (Wuhan) Co., Ltd.
- Headquarters: Wuhan, China
- Area served: China
- Key people: Ge Shuwen (President)
- Products: Automobiles
- Production output: ▼47,769 (2018)
- Owner: Dongfeng Motor Group (50%); Renault S.A. (50%)

Chinese name
- Simplified Chinese: 东风雷诺汽车有限公司
- Traditional Chinese: 東風雷諾汽車有限公司
Transcriptions
Standard Mandarin
- Hanyu Pinyin: Dōngfēng Léinuò Qìchē Yǒuxiàn Gōngsī

Dongfeng Renault
- Simplified Chinese: 东风雷诺
- Traditional Chinese: 東風雷諾
Transcriptions
Standard Mandarin
- Hanyu Pinyin: Dōngfēng Léinuò
- Wade–Giles: Tung^{1}-feng^{1} Lei^{2}-no^{4}
- IPA: [tʊ́ŋfə́ŋ lěɪnwɔ̂]
Yue: Cantonese
- Yale Romanization: Dūngfūng Lèuihnohk
- Jyutping: Dung1 fung1 leoi4 nok6
- Website: www.dongfeng-renault.com.cn

Dongfeng Renault Automobile Company (DRAC) or Dongfeng Renault was an equally owned Chinese joint venture between car manufacturers Dongfeng Motor Group and Renault aimed to produce and sell Renault-badged vehicles, established in 2013. The joint venture emerged from Sanjiang Renault, a previous partnership between Renault and Sanjiang Space established in 1993. Renault announced it planned to withdraw from the joint venture in April 2020.

== History ==
=== Sanjiang Renault Period ===
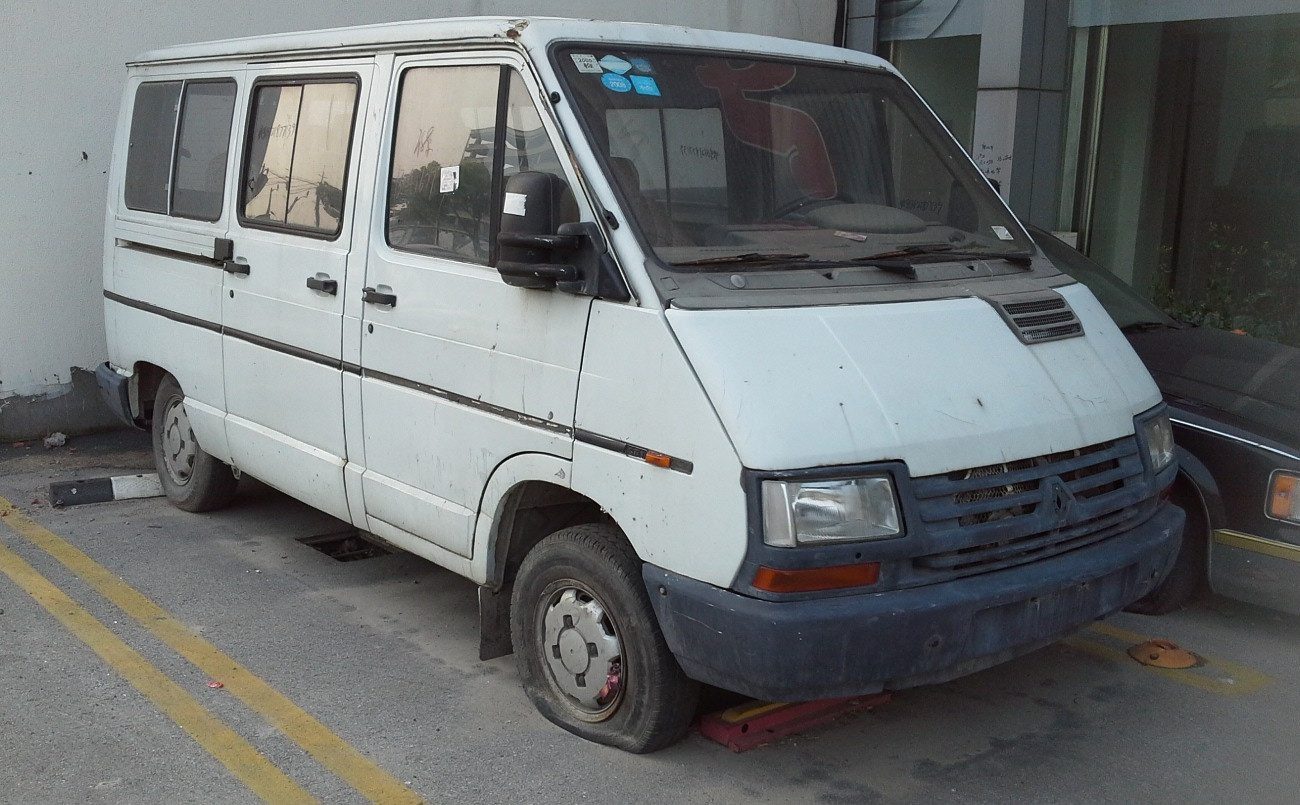
Sanjiang Renault Trafic

On November 6, 1993, Renault Group signed a joint venture contract with China Aerospace Sanjiang Group (affiliated to China Aerospace Science and Industry Corporation). On December 31 of the same year, Sanjiang Renault Automobile Co., Ltd. was established, with its headquarters in Xiaogan City, Hubei Province. Sanjiang Renault invested US$98 million, with Sanjiang Aerospace holding 55% and Renault holding 45%. On June 22, 1995, the Renault Trafic light passenger car produced by Sanjiang Renault was put on the market. In addition, a small number of Renault Espace were produced in the CKD method. Due to the low localization rate of Sanjiang Renault's production models, the cooperation process was unsuccessful and resulted in losses., which leads to high product prices and affects its sales As of 2003, (Some say it was discontinued in 2004) Sanjiang Renault's total production was only 4,906 units.

In August 2000, Sanjiang Renault's Chinese shareholder, Aerospace Sanjiang, stopped light vehicle production and withdrew from the Sanjiang Renault project. On May 23, 2001, Aerospace Brilliance, a joint venture between Brilliance Auto and CASIC, planned to acquire Aerospace Sanjiang's 55% stake in Sanjiang Renault. Brilliance Auto had an equity dispute in 2002 and was announced to be nationalized, thus temporarily suspending its restructuring In August 2003, Xiang Torch was acquired by Weichai Power in 2005(now known as Weichai Torch), acquired 50% of the shares of Aerospace Brilliance held by Brilliance and established Aerospace Torch, with the purpose of opening up cooperation channels with Renault and entering the passenger car manufacturing industry. As the two parties could not reach an agreement on production qualifications and vehicle model introduction, Xiang Torch transferred its 50% stake in Aerospace Torch to China Aerospace Science and Industry Corporation and Shenyang Aerospace Xinguang Group, and Sanjiang Renault once again suspended its reorganization.

=== Dongfeng Renault Period ===
With the failure of the cooperation with Sanjiang Renault and the postponement of the restructuring, Renault began to negotiate cooperation with China Dongfeng Motor. During the negotiation process, the two sides found it difficult to reach an agreement on a series of issues, including the location of the factory and how to restructure Sanjiang Renault, which led to a long negotiation period. In fact, as early as 2003, when Carlos Ghosn, then CEO of Renault–Nissan Alliance, signed a joint venture agreement with Dongfeng Motor for Dongfeng Nissan, he said that Renault models would be produced in mainland China in due course. At that time, the three companies established the Dongfeng-Renault-Nissan "Golden Triangle" tripartite cooperation mechanism. At the same time, Renault's sales in China also increased from less than 900 vehicles in 2008 to more than 24,200 vehicles in 2011.

On January 31, 2012, Renault COO Carlos Tavares said that Renault was "close to completing final negotiations with Dongfeng Motor Corporation". In the same year, Dongfeng Motor and Aerospace Sanjiang signed an equity transfer agreement, and Dongfeng Motor acquired Aerospace Sanjiang's equity in Sanjiang Renault. The cooperation project between Dongfeng Renault and the Ministry of Environmental Protection of the People's Republic of China was approved by the State-owned Assets Supervision and Administration Commission of the State Council in May 2013, and the change registration approval was obtained from the Administration for Industry and Commerce in June of the same year. The National Development and Reform Commission also officially approved the project of Dongfeng Renault on December 2. The two parties signed the contract on December 16 and obtained the approval of the Ministry of Commerce of the People's Republic of China on January 26, 2014. According to the contract, Renault and Dongfeng jointly invested 7.76 billion yuan to establish Dongfeng Renault, with each party holding 50% of the shares. Since then, all relevant work on the tripartite cooperation mechanism of Dongfeng-Renault-Nissan "Golden Triangle" has been completed. Dongfeng Renault also backdoor acquired the production qualifications of Sanjiang Renault, but since Sanjiang Renault is only allowed to produce SUV and commercial vehicles, Dongfeng Renault's first model must be an SUV according to government requirements. If it wants to produce sedans, it needs to apply for approval separately later. Dongfeng Renault obtained the qualification to produce sedans in mid-2017. Although Renault pushed hard to build a factory in Guangzhou, which has the largest passenger car production base under Dongfeng Nissan, and the Huadu District government also set up a leading group in 2007 to follow up on the project site selection, the Dongfeng Renault production base was finally settled in Wuhan, where Dongfeng's headquarters is located. In addition, according to Dongfeng Renault's plan, Renault China's dealer network will be integrated.

On March 18, 2016, Dongfeng Renault launched its first model, the Koleos, followed by the Koleos in the same year, the Koleos SUV and the all-electric Renault e-Trump in 2019. Dongfeng Renault sold 72,000 vehicles in 2017, the highest in history; in 2019, sales were only 18,500 vehicles, a year-on-year decline of 63%. Due to the impact of the COVID-19 epidemic, the cumulative sales in January–March 2020 were only 663 vehicles, a year-on-year decline of 88.65%. In addition, from 2016 to 2019, Dongfeng Renault sponsored the Wuhan Marathon.

On April 14, 2020, Dongfeng Group Co., Ltd. announced that it plans to reorganize Dongfeng Renault. Renault plans to transfer its 50% stake in Dongfeng Renault to Dongfeng Group Co., Ltd. and stop Renault brand-related business activities. On August 28 of the same year, Dongfeng Renault Automobile Co., Ltd. was renamed Dongfeng Motor (Wuhan) Co., Ltd., which meant that Renault officially withdrew from the ranks of shareholders and the company became a subsidiary of Dongfeng Group Co., Ltd. The original Dongfeng Renault factory was transformed into a Dongfeng intelligent manufacturing production base to produce Voyah brand models.

== Operations ==
Dongfeng Renault was in charge of Renault's China sales. The Dongfeng Renault plant was built at Wuhan and started production in February 2016. It had an estimated output of up to 150,000 vehicles per year. The Renault's Wuhan facilities also included an engine workshop and a research and development centre. Production focused on sport utility vehicles (SUVs).

=== Produced models ===
- Renault Koleos (2016–2020)
- Renault Kadjar (2016–2020)
- Renault City K-ZE (2019-2020)
- Renault Captur (2019-2020)

=== Imported models ===
- Renault Fluence (2010-2018)
- Renault Latitude (2010-2018)
- Renault Talisman (2012-2017)
- Renault Koleos (2010-2016)
- Renault Captur (2013-2019)
- Renault Megane R.S. (2013-2018)
- Renault Espace (2018-2020)

== Gallery ==
=== Produced models ===
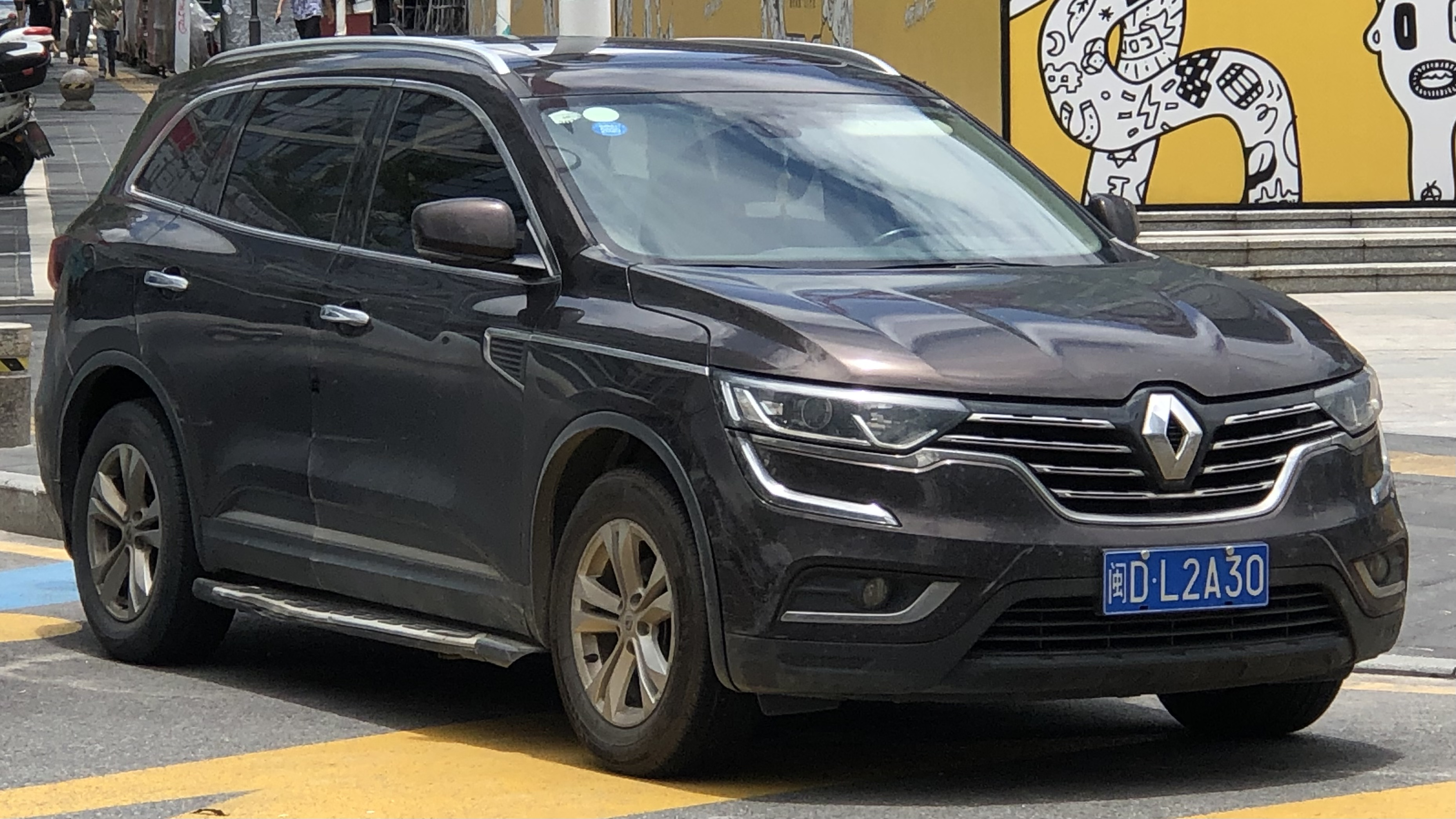
Renault Koleos

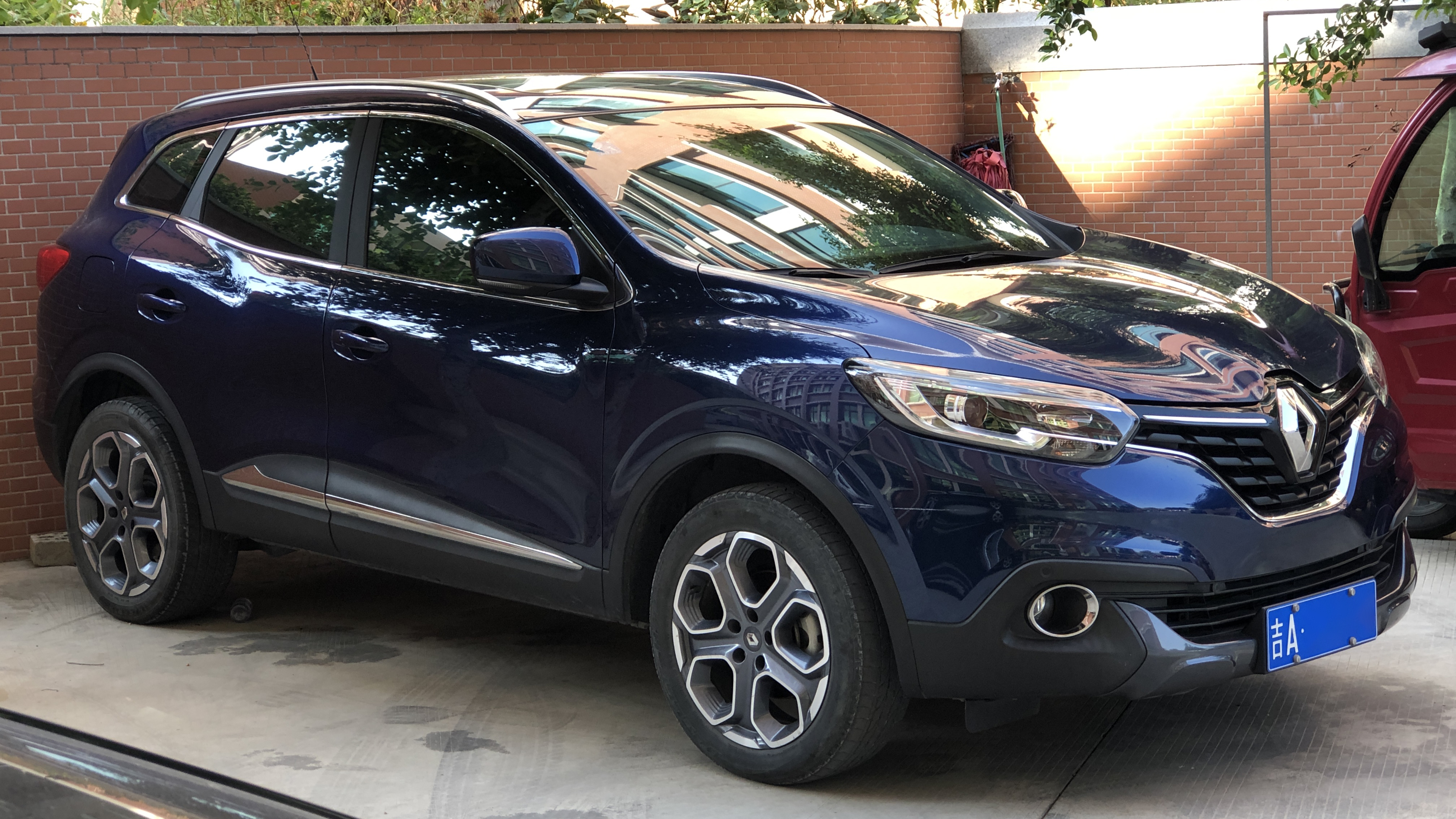
Renault Kadjar

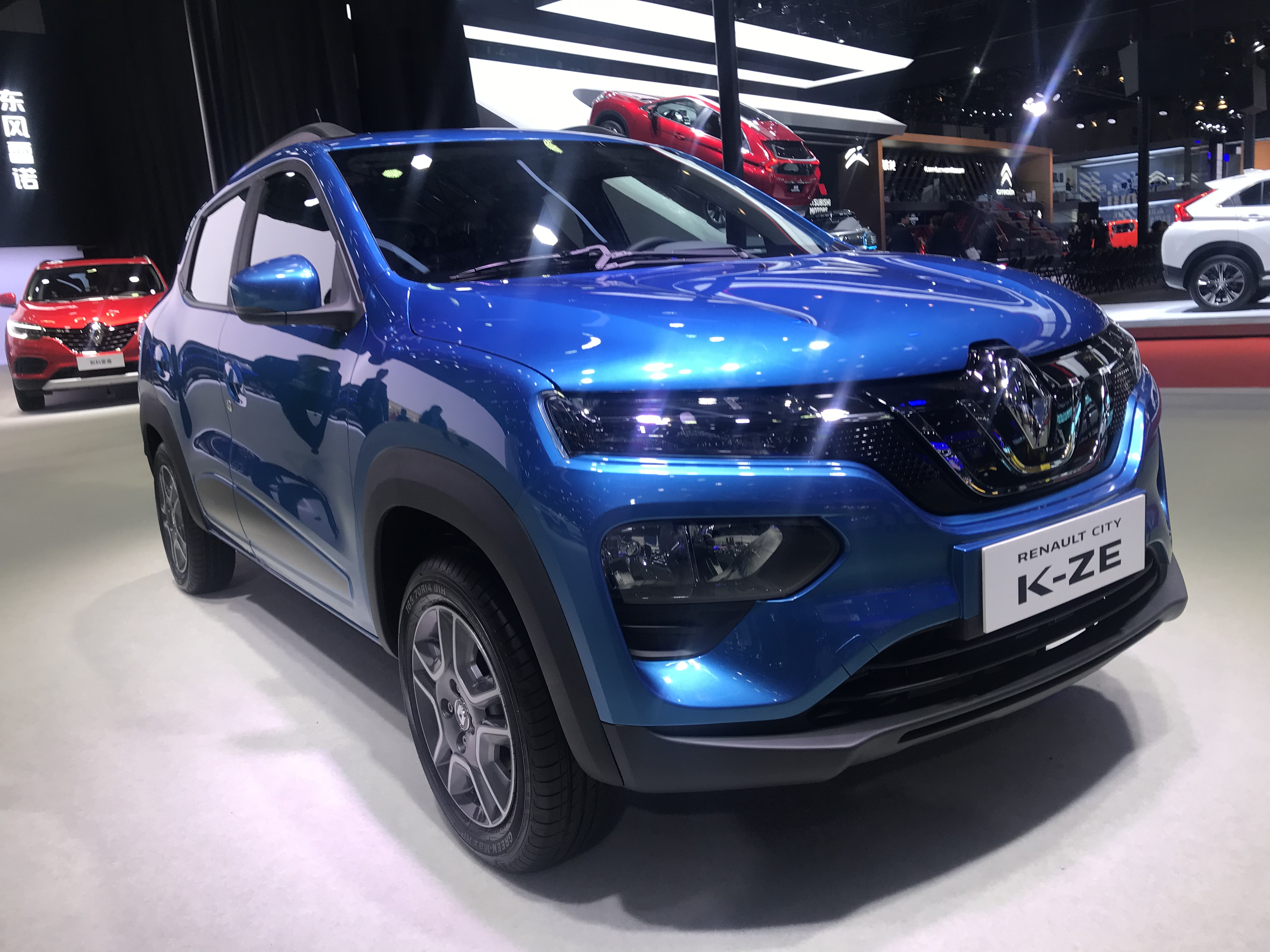
Renault City K-ZE

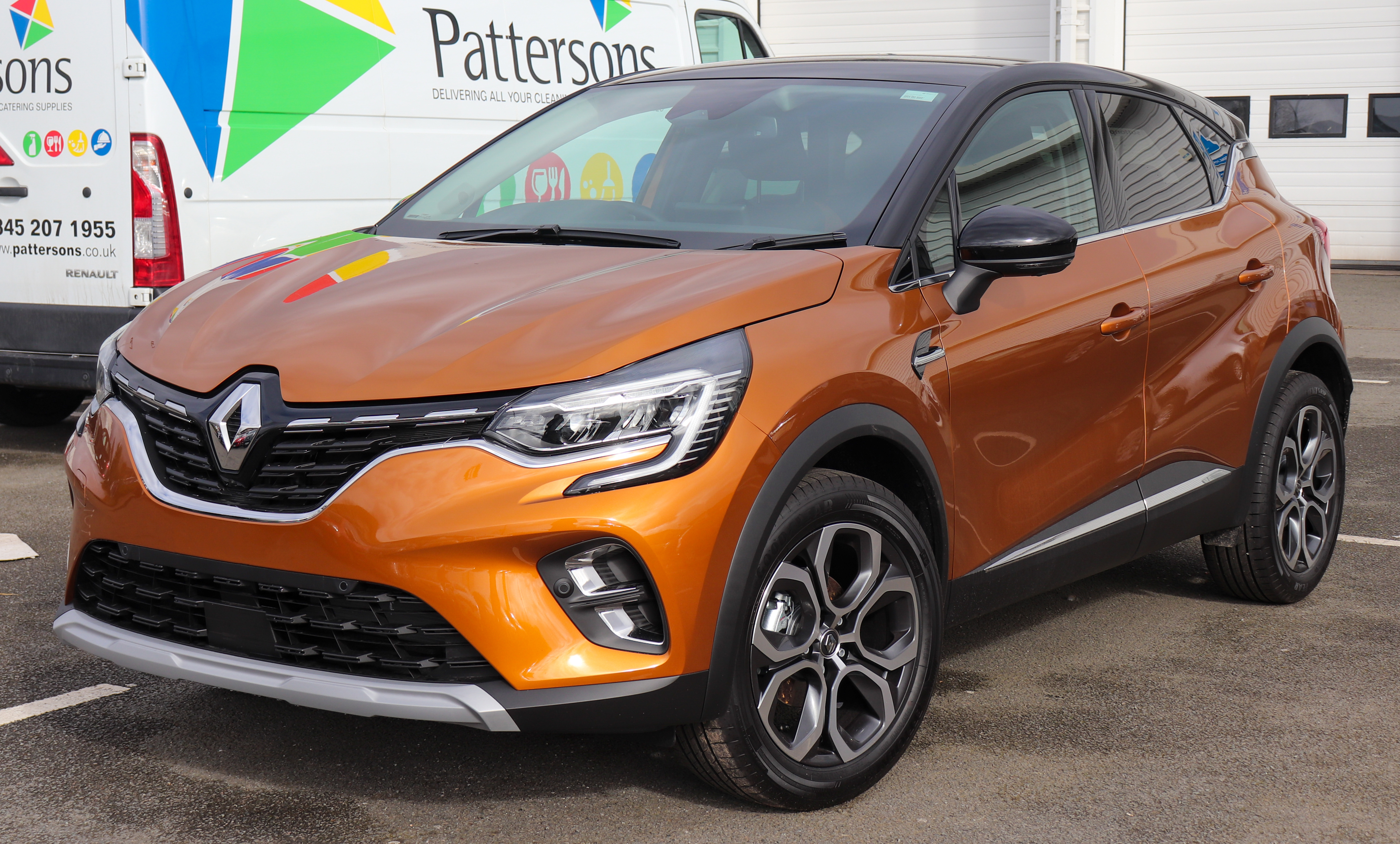
Renault Captur

=== Imported models ===
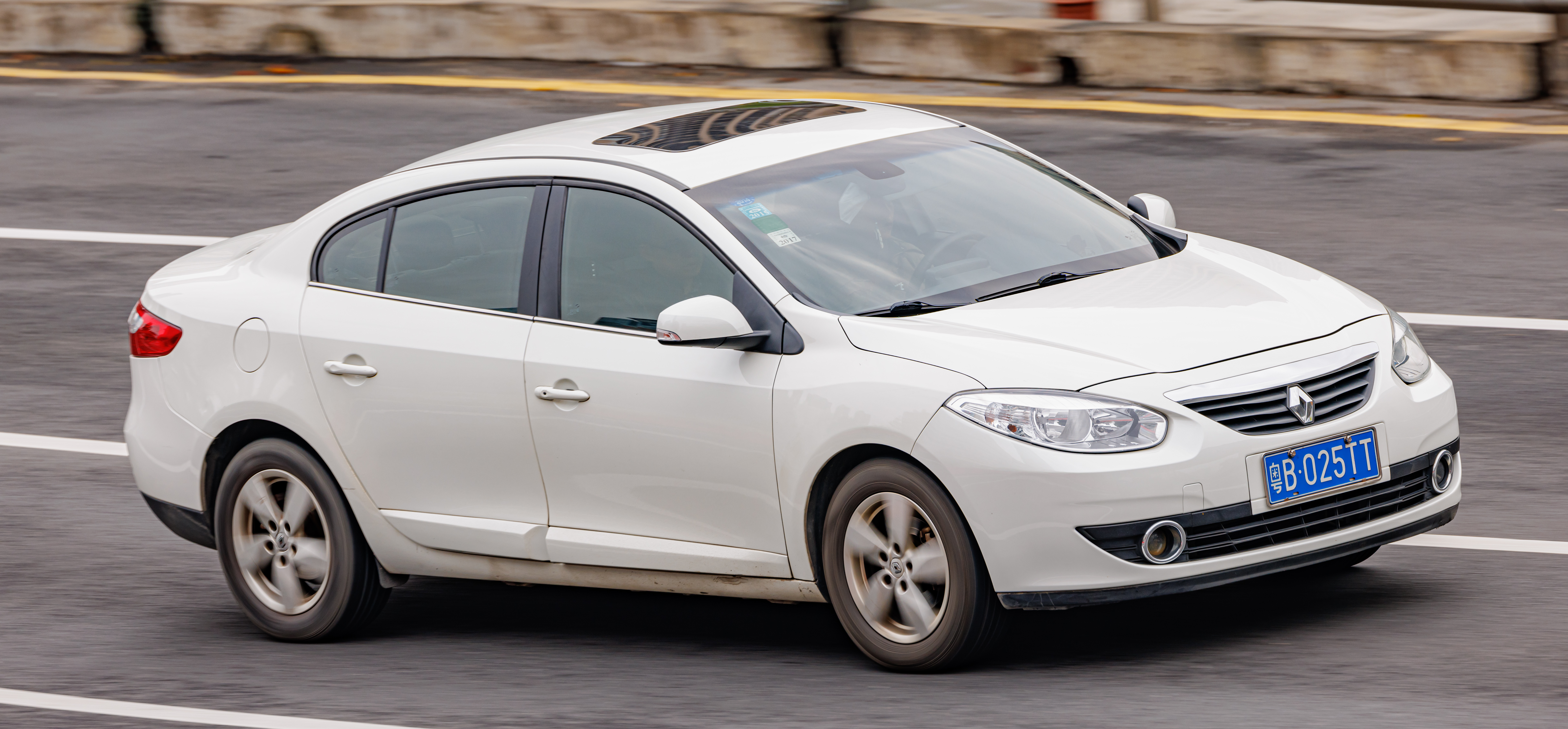
Renault Fluence

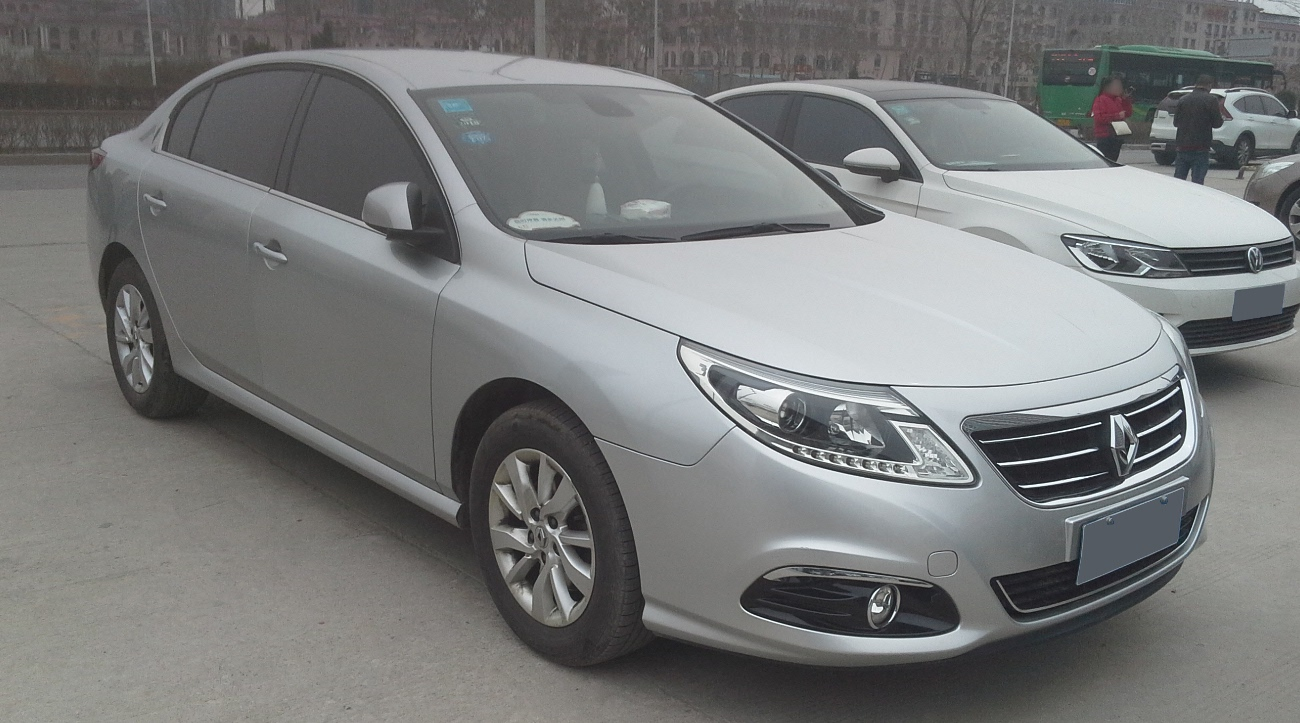
Renault Latitude

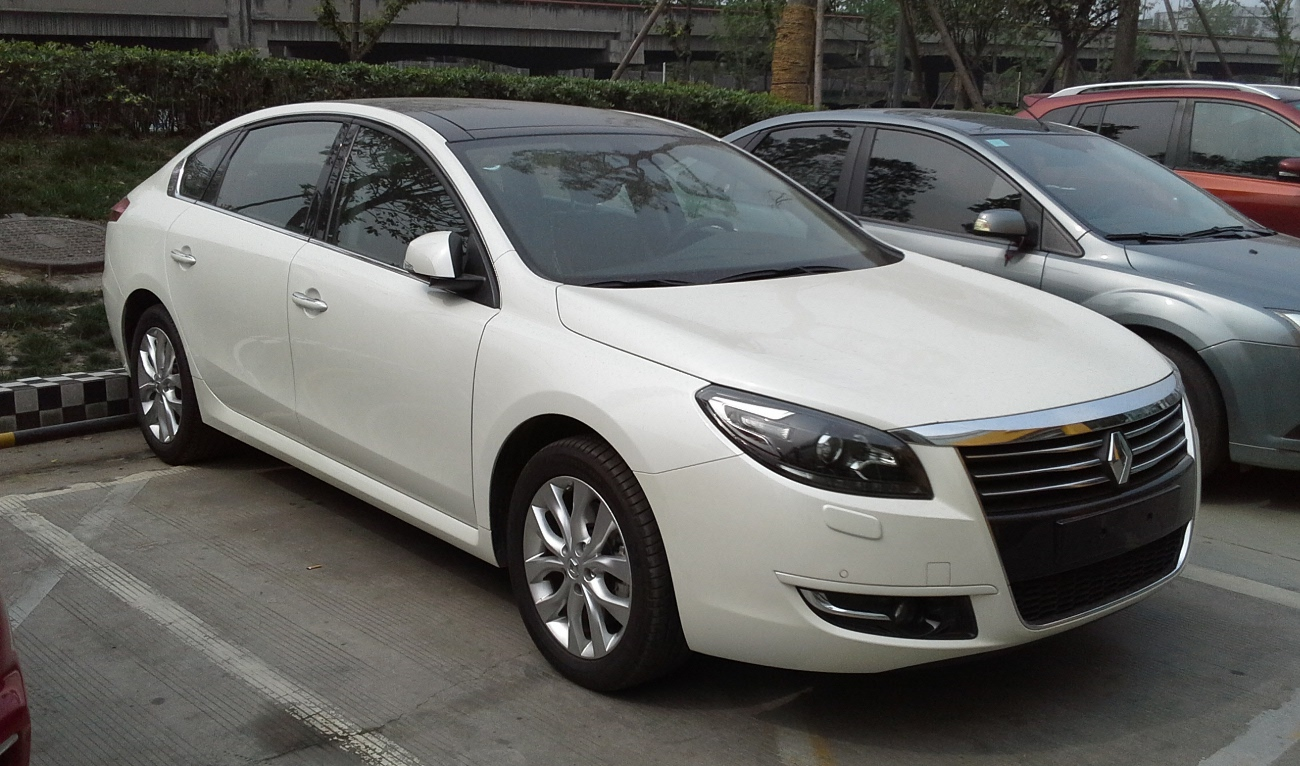
Renault Talisman

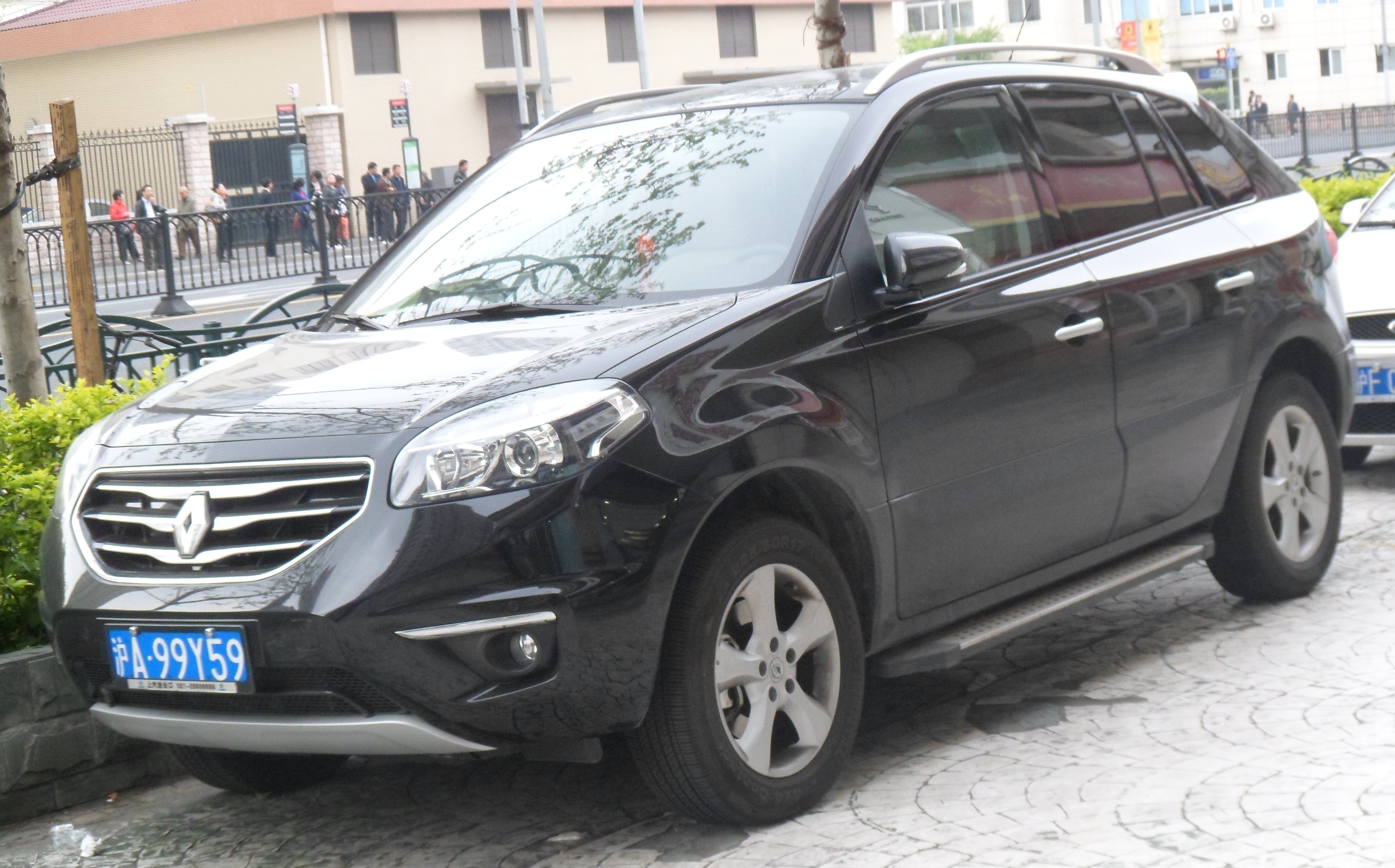
Renault Koleos

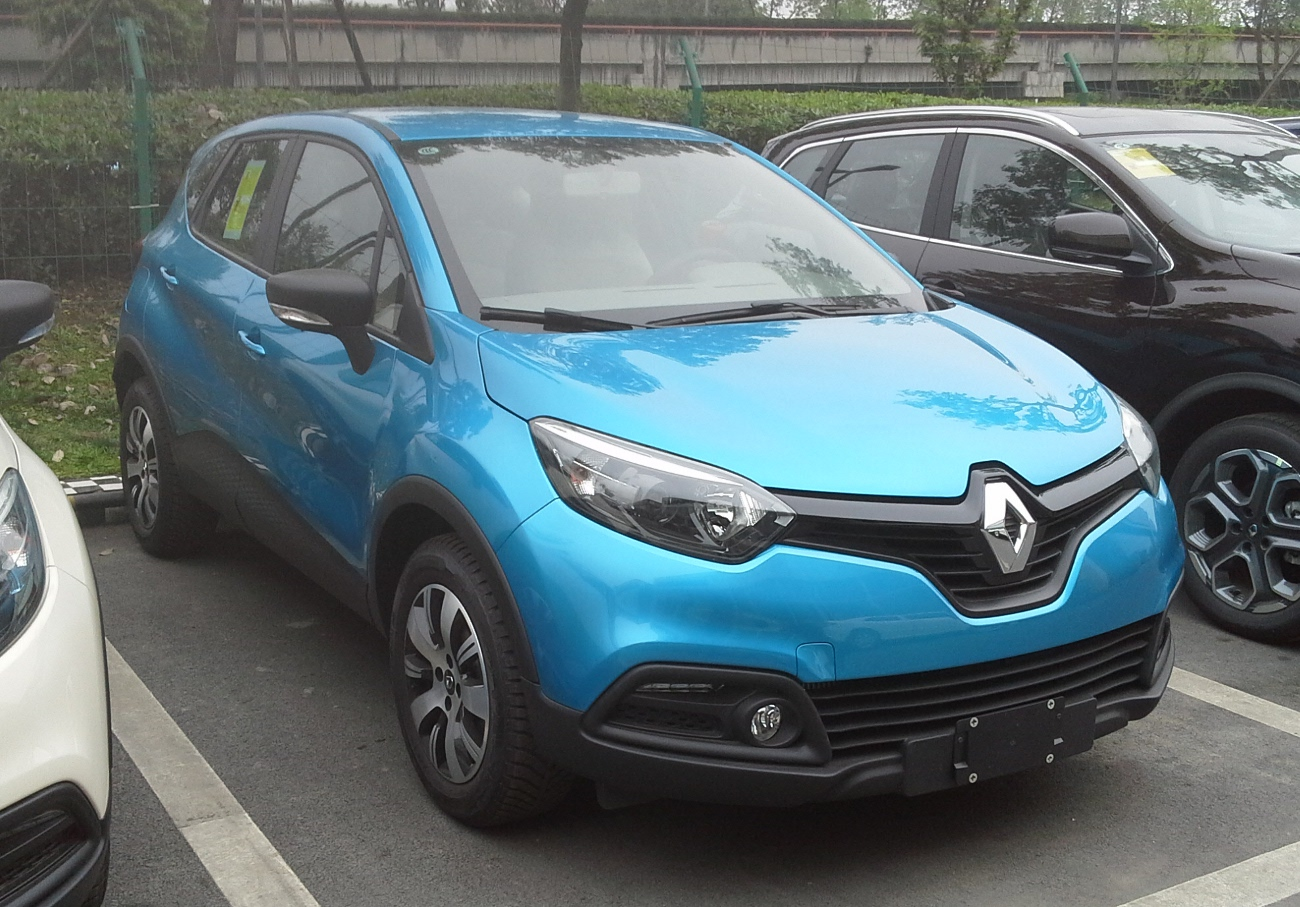
Renault Captur

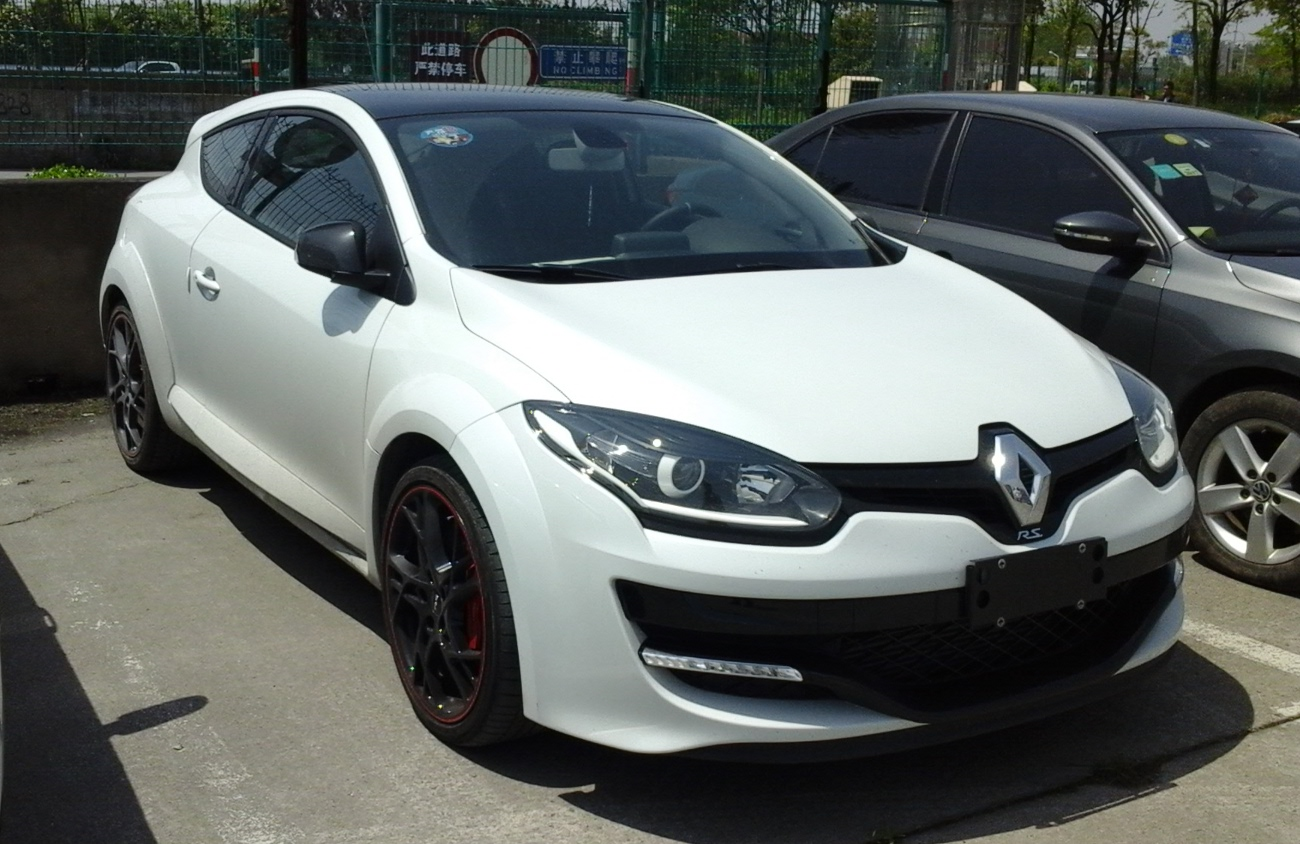
Renault Megane RS

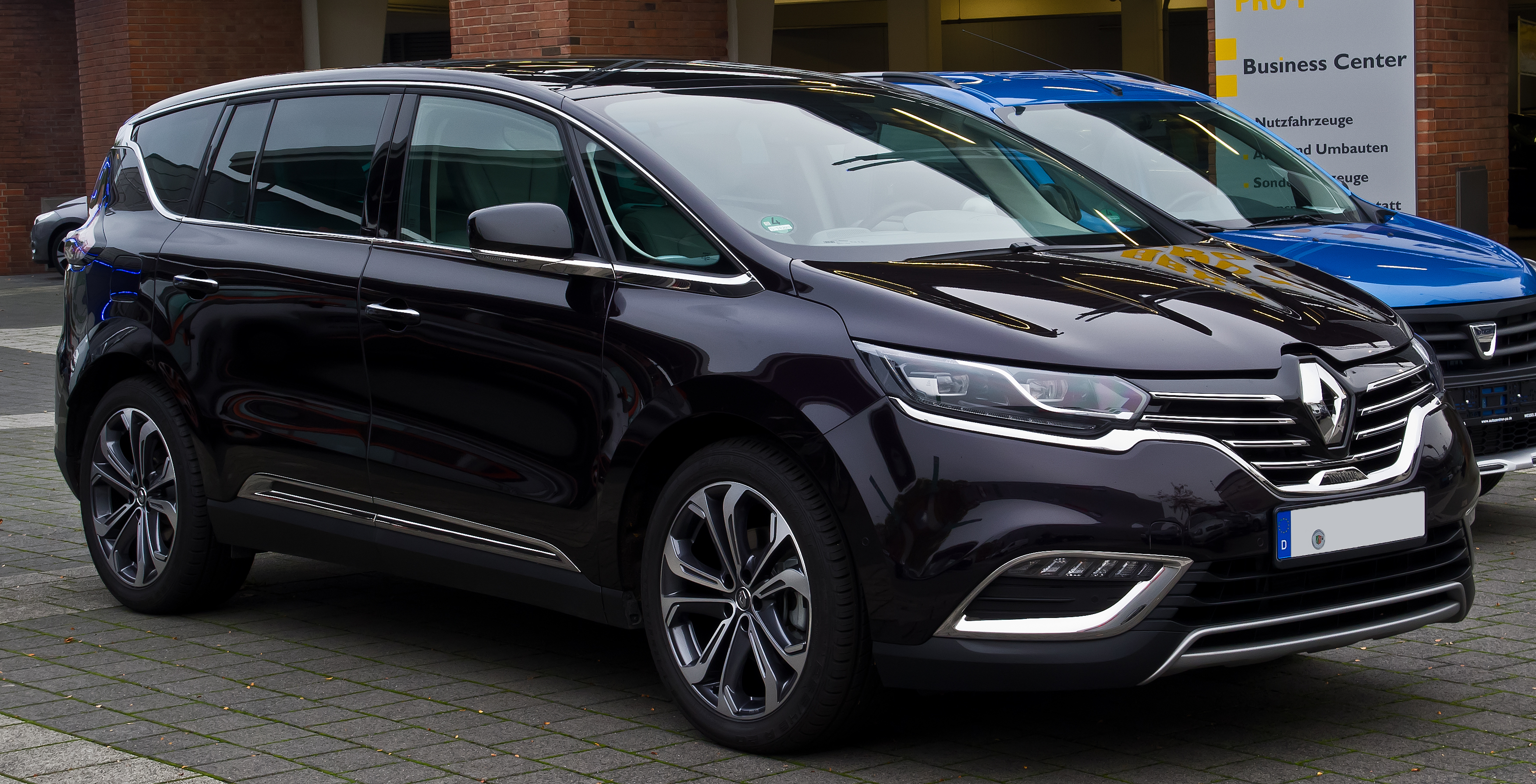
Renault Espace
