= 2016 Chinese Women's Super League =

- Dates: 1 April–10 November 2016
- Champions: Dalian Quanjian F.C. (4th title)
- Relegated: People's Liberation Army F.C.
- Matches: 56
- Goals: 148 (2.64 per match)
- Top goalscorer: (China) Ma Xiaoxu (12)
- Best goalkeeper: (China) Bi Xiaolin
- Biggest home win: Tianjin Huisen 5–0 People's Liberation Army F.C. (24 April 2016)
- Biggest away win: People's Liberation Army F.C. 0–5 Dalian Quanjian F.C. (10 September 2016)
- Highest scoring: Beijing Enterprise Phoenix 5–2 Tianjin Huisen (25 September 2016)
- Longest winless run: 14 matches People's Liberation Army F.C.
- Longest losing run: 14 matches People's Liberation Army F.C.
- All statistics correct as of 29 November 2017.

The 2016 Chinese Women's Super League season was the league's second season in the league's current incarnation, and the 20th total season of the women's association football league in China.

== Results ==
Pos	Team	Pld	W	D	L	GF	GA	GD	Pts	Qualification
1	Dalian Quanjian F.C.	14	9	4	1	29	7	+22	31	Champions
2	Shanghai Yung Park Changyuan	14	9	3	2	26	11	+15	30	
3	Changchun Zhuoyue	14	8	3	3	25	9	+16	27	
4	Shandong JFSS	14	5	3	6	14	17	−3	18	
5	Tianjin Huisen	14	5	3	6	17	25	−8	18	
6	Beijing Enterprise Phoenix	14	5	2	7	19	24	−5	17	
7	Jiangsu Suning	14	4	4	6	12	16	−4	16	Playoff
8	People's Liberation Army F.C.	14	0	0	14	6	39	−33	0	Relegation

Updated to match(es) played on 31 October 2016. Source: Chinese Football Association

Jiangsu Suning won its playoff match against lower-division CWFL Zhejiang to remain in the CWSL. People's Liberation Army F.C. were relegated to the lower division league.

== Honors and awards ==
=== Best XI ===
Source: Chinese Football Association

Pos.	Player	Club
GK	(China) Bi Xiaolin	Dalian Quanjian F.C.
DF	(China) Wu Haiyan	Shandong Xiangshang
DF	(China) Li Dongna	Dalian Quanjian F.C.
DF	(China) Zhao Rong	Changchun Zhuoyue
DF	(Brazil) Rafaelle	Changchun Zhuoyue
MF	(China) Gu Yasha	Beijing BG
MF	(China) Tan Ruyin	Changchun Zhuoyue
MF	(China) Ren Guixin	Changchun Zhuoyue
MF	(China) Wang Shuang	Dalian Quanjian F.C.
FW	(China) Ma Xiaoxu	Dalian Quanjian F.C.
FW	(China) Li Ying	Shandong Huangming

=== Annual awards ===
- Best Young Player: Yan Jinjin, Shanghai Yongbai
- Best Coach of the League: Shui Qingxia, Shanghai Yongbai
- Golden Glove: Bi Xiaolin, Dalian Quanjian F.C.
- Golden Boot: Ma Xiaoxu, Dalian Quanjian F.C.
- Most Valuable Player: Ma Xiaoxu, Dalian Quanjian F.C.
