= 2017 Chinese Women's Super League =

== Super League ==
Chinese Women's Super League
- Dates: 18 March–8 October 2017
- Champions: Dalian Quanjian (5th title)
- Relegated: Hebei China Fortune; Shandong Sports Lottery
- Matches: 56
- Goals: 170 (3.04 per match)
- Top goalscorer: (Nigeria) Asisat Oshoala (12 goals)
- Biggest home win: Dalian Quanjian 8–0 Beijing Enterprise Phoenix (30 September 2017)
- Biggest away win: Beijing Enterprise Phoenix 0–5 Dalian Quanjian (8 July 2017)
- Highest scoring: Dalian Quanjian 8–0 Beijing Enterprise Phoenix (30 September 2017)
- All statistics correct as of 29 November 2017.

The 2017 Chinese Women's Super League season was the league's third season in its current incarnation, and the 21st total season of the women's association football league in China.

Dalian Quanjian were the defending champions

=== League table ===
Pos	Team	Pld	W	D	L	GF	GA	GD	Pts	Qualification
1	Dalian Quanjian	14	10	2	2	40	11	+29	32	Champions
2	Changchun Rural Commercial Bank	14	9	2	3	26	9	+17	29	
3	Jiangsu Suning	14	8	3	3	32	14	+18	27	
4	Shanghai	14	8	1	5	27	24	+3	25	
5	Tianjin Huisen	14	5	3	6	14	18	−4	18	
6	Beijing Enterprise Phoenix	14	3	3	8	10	34	−24	12	
7	Hebei China Fortune	14	1	4	9	11	32	−21	7	Playoff
8	Shandong Sports Lottery	14	1	4	9	10	28	−18	7	Relegation

Updated to match(es) played on 8 October 2017. Source: China Football Association
Rules for classification: 1) Points; 2) Head-to-head points; 3) Head-to-head goal difference; 4) Head-to-head goals scored; 5) Goal difference; 6) Goals scored; 7) Disciplinary points (1 point for each yellow card, 3 points for each red card); 8) Reserve league points; 9) Draw

== League One ==
Chinese Women's League One
- Dates: 19 March 2017 - 8 October 2017
- Champions: Wuhan Jianghan University
- Promoted: Wuhan Jianghan University; Henan Huishang
- Top goalscorer: (China) Zhao Tong (10 goals)

=== League table ===
Pos	Team	Pld	W	D	L	GF	GA	GD	Pts	Qualification
1	Wuhan Jianghan University (C, P)	14	10	2	2	40	10	+30	32	Promoted
2	Henan Huishang (P)	14	9	1	4	33	11	+22	28	Promoted
3	Zhejiang Lander	14	8	1	5	35	17	+18	25	
4	Guangdong Suoka	14	7	2	5	27	18	+9	23	
5	Bayi	14	5	3	6	26	16	+10	18	
6	Sichuan	14	5	3	6	19	18	+1	18	
7	Shaanxi	14	4	4	6	11	15	−4	16	
8	Nei Mongol Hengjun	14	0	0	14	1	87	−86	0	

Updated to match(es) played on 8 October 2017. Source:
Rules for classification: 1) Points; 2) Head-to-head points; 3) Head-to-head goal difference; 4) Head-to-head goals scored; 5) Goal difference; 6) Goals scored; 7) Disciplinary points (1 point for each yellow card, 3 points for each red card); 8) Reserve league points; 9) Draw
(C) Champions; (P) Promoted

== Super League Relegation Playoff ==
5 November 2017
16:00 UTC+8

Hebei China Fortune	3–3	Henan Huishang
Cui Xingchen 7'; Zang Wei 59', 79'		Cui Yazhen 55'; Lou Jiahui 74', 82'
Penalties
	1–4
