= Ilıca, Manavgat =

Ilıca
- Neighbourhood
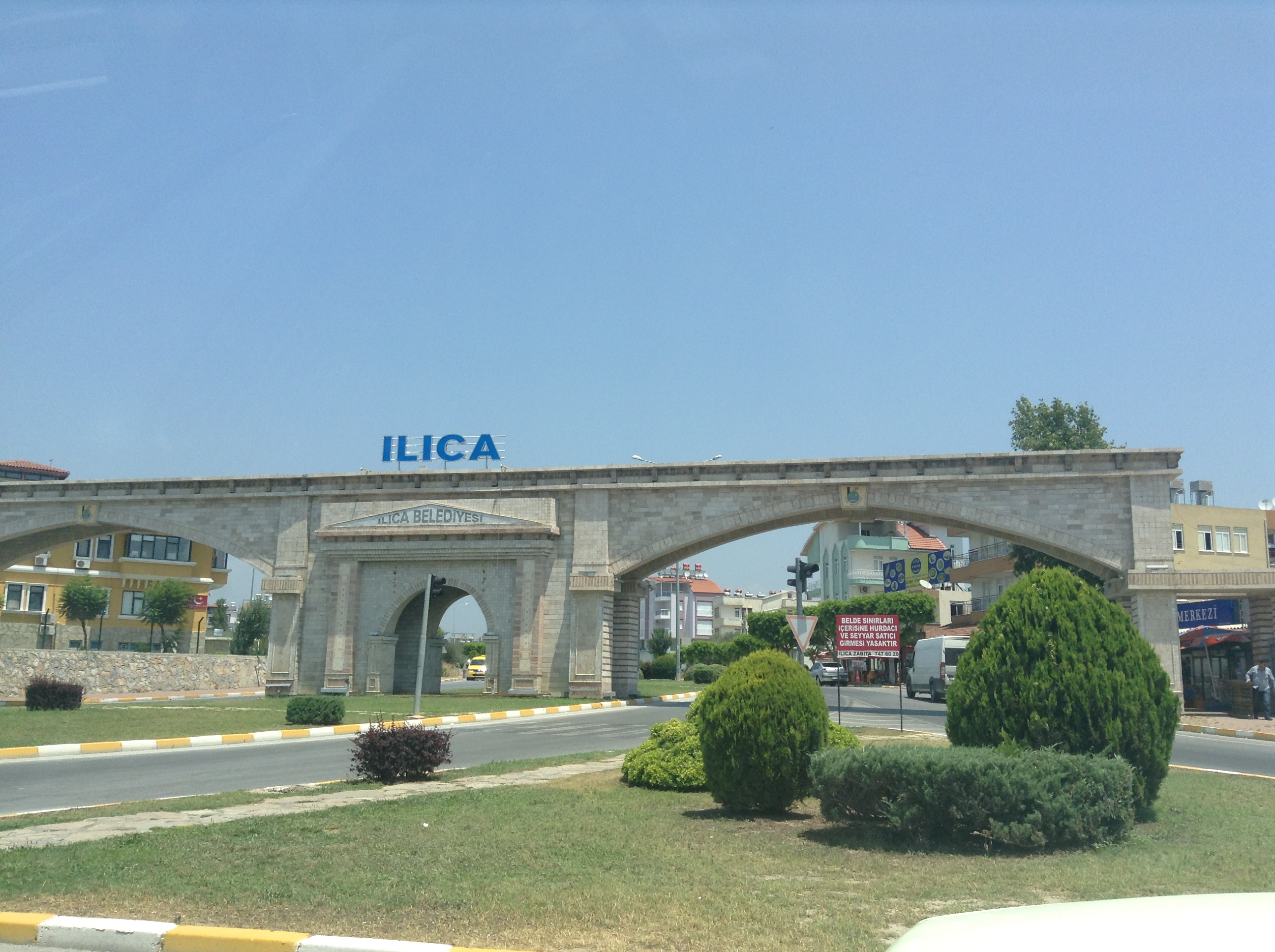

- Location within Turkey
- Coordinates: 36°49′19″N 31°22′2″E
- Country: Turkey
- Province: Antalya
- District: Manavgat
- Population (2022): 10,754
- Time zone: UTC+3 (TRT)

Ilıca is a neighbourhood of the municipality and district of Manavgat, Antalya Province, Turkey. Its population is 10,754 (2022). Before the 2013 reorganisation, it was a town (belde). It is 3 km inland from the beach resort of Kumköy, near Side, on the "Turkish Riviera". The centre of Ilıca has a rural village character with old stone houses built around a central square. There are a handful of small shops, a small park, a teahouse, a weekly open market, primary school and the inevitable football ground.

The Arslan Zeki Demirci Sports Complex is located in Ilıca.
