= Arslan Zeki Demirci Sports Complex =

Sports venue in Manavgat, Turkey

Coordinates: 36.81014°N 31.35903°E

Arslan Zeki Demirci Sports Complex (Turkish: Arslan Zeki Demirci Spor Kompleksi), also known as Emirhan Sport Center or Emirhan Sport Complex, is a sports venue in Manavgat district of Antalya Province, southern Turkey.

The sports complex is part of Emir Hotel in Manavgat district of Antalya Province. It is named after the late philanthropist businessman Arslan Zeki Demirci (1936–2012), CEO of the Emirhan Group Hotels. There are twelve football fields in the sports complex.

The sports complex is preferred by many local football clubs playing in the leagues Süper Lig, First, Second and Third League as well as teams from top-level foreign leagues such as the First Professional Football League of Bulgaria, Ekstraklasa of Poland, Albanian Superliga, Swiss Super League, Nemzeti Bajnokság I of Hungary, KTFF Süper Lig of Northern Cyprus in Europe, Argentine Primera División in South America, UAE Persian Gulf League and Chinese Super League in Asia for practice matches during the league winter break.

All qualification matches of the 2021 Turkcell Women's Football League are played at the sport complex between 17 and 24 April 2021 due to ongoing COVID-19 pandemic in Turkey.

== International events hosted ==
The sports complex hosted all six matches of the Group 1 in the 2017 UEFA European Under-17 Championship qualification's Elite round, and will be hosting all six matches of the Elite round's Group 2 in the 2017 UEFA Women's Under-19 Championship qualification.

2019 UEFA Women's Under-19 Championship qualification - Group 2 matches were played between 3 and 9 October 2018 at the sports complex.

UEFA Women's Euro 2021 qualifying Group A match of Turkey against Kosovo was held on 23 October 2020.

It was also the host of the 2021 Turkish Women's Cup.
