= Dalian W.F.C. =

- Founded: 1984 as Dalian Women's Football Team; 2015 as Dalian Quanjian F.C.
- Dissolved: 24 December 2019
- Ground: Dalian Sports Centre Stadium
- Capacity: 61,000
Home colours	Away colours

Dalian Women's Football Club (Chinese: 大连女子足球俱乐部) was a professional Chinese football club in Dalian, Liaoning.

== History ==
The team was founded in 1984 as Dalian Women's Football Team, and participated in National Games of China, representing Liaoning province. In 1994, Dalian Women's Football Team won the Chinese Women's Football League championship for the first time. However, the team encountered some difficulties, and suffered for a few years. In 2002, Dalian Shide Corp. purchased the team and officially named it as Dalian Shide Women's F.C.

In 2013 when Dalian Shide F.C. broke down and was purchased by Dalian Aerbin, the women's team also changed its name to Dalian Aerbin W.F.C. However, they faced financial problems shortly after winning a championship in 2013.

Quanjian Group took possession of the team in 2015 and renamed it as Dalian Quanjian F.C. In 2016, the team won the Chinese Women's Super League championship. Before the 2017 Chinese Women's Super League season, they made several prominent international player acquisitions, including Asisat Oshoala from Arsenal L.F.C. and Gaelle Enganamouit from FC Rosengård, hired manager Farid Benstiti, previously manager of Paris Saint-Germain, and unveiled new uniforms and staff.

In 2019 Shu Yuhui president of Quanjian was arrested and Dalian Quanjian F.C. was renamed Dalian W.F.C.; after the season, it was dissolved.

== Ownership and naming history ==
Period	Name
1984–1995	Dalian
1995–1997	Dalian Zhonghao
1997–1998	Dalian Keda Medicines
2000–2001	Dalian Kaifei
2002–2013	Dalian Shide
2013–2015	Dalian Aerbin
2015–2019	Dalian Quanjian
2019	Dalian

== Crest history ==
Dalian Quanjian
2015–2019

=== Notable players ===
- (China) Han Duan
- (China) Bi Yan
- (China) Han Wenxia
- (Nigeria) Asisat Oshoala
- (Brazil) Fabiana da Silva Simões
- (Brazil) Gabi Zanotti
- (Brazil) Debora Cristiane de Oliveira

== Coaching staff ==
=== Managerial history ===
As of 22 Dec 2016

Managers	Period
(China) Liu Zhongchang	2011 - 2012
(China) Gai Zengjun	2012
(China) Shi Lei	2013 - 2016
(France) Farid Benstiti	2016 - 2019

== Honours ==
=== League ===
- Women's Super League (Women's National Football League)

Winners (6): 2008, 2012, 2013, 2016, 2017, 2018
