= Tajikistan women's national football team results =

This page details the match results and statistics of the Tajikistan women's national football team.

Tajikistan women's national football team is the representative of Tajikistan in international women's association football, It is governed by the Tajikistan Football Federation (FFT) and it competes as a member of the Asian Football Confederation (AFC).

the national team's first activity was in 2017. where the team started its women's football journey with an International Friendly against Kyrgyzstan as a preparation for their 2018 AFC Women's Asian Cup qualification campaign, in which they played in an international tournament for the first time. Tajikistan opened their qualification tournament with a promising win against Iraq. however, the Tajiks lost their four next games finishing fifth ahead of Iraq whom they have beaten on the first day. the team is currently ranked 158th in the FIFA Women's World Rankings, ranked 33th in the Asian continent.

== Record per opponent ==
Key

Positive balance (more wins than losses)
Neutral balance (as many wins as losses)
Negative balance (more losses than wins)

The following table shows Tajikistan' all-time official international record per opponent:

Opponent	Pld	W	D	L	GF	GA	GD	W%	Confederation
Afghanistan	1	1	0	0	5	0	+5	100	AFC
Bahrain	1	0	0	1	0	4	−4	0	AFC
China	1	0	0	1	0	16	−16	0	AFC
Chinese Taipei	1	0	0	1	0	9	−9	0	AFC
Hong Kong	2	0	0	2	1	9	−8	0	AFC
Iran	2	0	0	2	1	9	−8	0	AFC
Iraq	1	1	0	0	1	0	+1	100	AFC
Jordan	1	0	0	1	2	10	−8	0	AFC
Kyrgyzstan	5	2	1	2	4	5	−1	40	AFC
Malaysia	1	0	0	1	0	1	−1	0	AFC
Maldives	1	1	0	0	4	0	+4	100	AFC
Mongolia	1	1	0	0	4	1	+3	100	AFC
Nepal	1	0	0	1	0	1	−1	0	AFC
North Korea	2	0	0	2	0	26	−26	0	AFC
Pakistan	1	0	0	1	0	1	−1	0	AFC
Palestine	1	0	0	1	0	3	−3	0	AFC
Philippines	3	0	0	3	1	19	−18	0	AFC
Saudi Arabia	2	0	0	2	0	7	−7	0	AFC
Singapore	2	1	1	0	6	0	+6	50	AFC
Turkmenistan	1	0	1	0	1	1	0	0	AFC
United Arab Emirates	2	0	1	1	0	1	−1	0	AFC
Uzbekistan	3	0	0	3	0	29	−29	0	AFC
Vietnam	1	0	0	1	0	7	−7	0	AFC
Total	37	7	4	26	30	153	−129	18.92	—

== Results ==
=== 2017 ===
28 February 2017 International Friendly	Kyrgyzstan	1–1	Tajikistan	Almaty, Kazakhstan
15:00 UTC+6		Report		Stadium: Almaty Central Stadium

3 April 2017 2018 AFC Women's Asian Cup qualifying Group A	Iraq	0–1	Tajikistan	Dushanbe, Tajikistan
16:00 UTC+5		Report	Halimova 87'	Stadium: Republican Central Stadium; Attendance: 110; Referee: Pansa Chaisanit (Thailand)

5 April 2017 2018 AFC Women's Asian Cup qualifying Group A	Bahrain	4–0	Tajikistan	Dushanbe, Tajikistan
16:00 UTC+5	Al-Hashmi 17', 20', 78'; Al-Dossary 46'	Report		Stadium: Republican Central Stadium; Attendance: 60; Referee: Oh Hyeon-jeong (Korea Republic)

7 April 2017 2018 AFC Women's Asian Cup qualifying Group A	Tajikistan	0–8	Philippines	Dushanbe, Tajikistan
16:00 UTC+5		Report	Madarang 17'; A. Castañeda 34', 85'; Long 38', 59', 84'; S. Castañeda 48'; Duran 90'	Stadium: Republican Central Stadium; Attendance: 120; Referee: Yoshimi Yamashita (Japan)

10 April 2017 2018 AFC Women's Asian Cup qualifying Group A	Tajikistan	2–10	Jordan	Dushanbe, Tajikistan
16:00 UTC+5	Iskandari 21'; Sotnikova 76'	Report	Al-Naber 4' (pen.), 63'; Jebreen 8', 15', 23', 45+3'; Sweilem 34', 45+2'; Al-Kousheh 69'; Al-Nahar 81'	Stadium: Republican Central Stadium; Attendance: 120; Referee: Anna Sidorova (Uzbekistan)

12 April 2017 2018 AFC Women's Asian Cup qualifying Group A	United Arab Emirates	1–0	Tajikistan	Dushanbe, Tajikistan
16:00 UTC+5	Rashid 90+3'	Report		Stadium: Republican Central Stadium; Attendance: 200; Referee: Rebecca Durcau (Australia)

=== 2018 ===
17 August 2018 2018 Asian Games Group B	North Korea	16–0	Tajikistan	Palembang, Indonesia
18:30 UTC+7	Sung Hyang-sim 2', 6', 24', 42'; Kim Yun-mi 10', 19', 50'; Rim Se-ok 31', 55', 66'; Yu Jong-im 43'; Kim Phyong-hwa 46'; Kim Nam-hui 62'; Kim Un-hwa 77', 82'; Ri Hae-yon 79'	Report		Stadium: Bumi Sriwijaya Stadium; Referee: Pansa Chaisanit (Thailand)

20 August 2018 2018 Asian Games Group B	Tajikistan	0–16	China	Palembang, Indonesia
18:30 UTC+7		Report	Zhao Rong 3', 19', 47', 59', 90'; Li Tingting 4'; Wang Shuang 51'; Wang Shanshan 64', 73', 81', 83', 87', 88', 90+1', 90+2', 90+3'	Stadium: Gelora Sriwijaya Stadium; Referee: Bui Thi Thu Trang (Vietnam)

22 August 2018 2018 Asian Games Group B	Hong Kong	6–1	Tajikistan	Palembang, Indonesia
18:30 UTC+7	Chan Wing Sze 2'; Heidi Yuen 10'; Ho Mui Mei 25', 32'; Cham Ching Man 39'; Chun Ching Hang 68'	Report	Sotnikova 36'	Stadium: Bumi Sriwijaya Stadium; Referee: Lee Yi-chi (Chinese Taipei)

4 November 2018 2020 AFC Women's Olympic Qualifying Group A	Mongolia	1–4	Tajikistan	Hisor, Tajikistan
16:00 UTC+5	Orgodol 32'	Report	L. Khalimova 9'; G. Khalimova 53'; Fozilova 65' (pen.), 69'	Stadium: Hisor Central Stadium; Attendance: 50; Referee: Kate Jacewicz (Australia)

6 November 2018 2020 AFC Women's Olympic Qualifying Group A	Tajikistan	0–9	Chinese Taipei	Hisor, Tajikistan
16:00 UTC+5		Report	Pao Hsin-hsuan 41', 44'; Yu Hsiu-chin 51', 55', 56'; Lee Hsiu-chin 66', 74'; Lin Hsin-hui 78', 82'	Stadium: Hisor Central Stadium; Attendance: 150; Referee: Pansa Chaisanit (Thailand)

8 November 2018 2020 AFC Women's Olympic Qualifying Group A	Philippines	3–1	Tajikistan	Hisor, Tajikistan
16:00 UTC+5	Cadag 30'; Castañeda 50', 76' (pen.)	Report	G. Khalimova 24'	Stadium: Hisor Central Stadium; Attendance: 70; Referee: Fusako Kajiyama (Japan)

13 November 2018 2020 AFC Women's Olympic Qualifying Group A	Tajikistan	6–0	Singapore	Hisor, Tajikistan
16:00 UTC+5	G. Khalimova 5', 12', 26', 38', 77'; Fozilova 47'	Report		Stadium: Hisor Central Stadium; Attendance: 50; Referee: Kate Jacewicz (Australia)

23 November 2018 2018 CAFA Women's Championship	Tajikistan	1–0	Kyrgyzstan	Tashkent, Uzbekistan
13:00 UTC+5	Fozilova 90+3'	Report		Stadium: Milliy Stadium; Attendance: 50; Referee: Khusnora Jumaeva (Uzbekistan)

25 November 2018 2018 CAFA Women's Championship	Uzbekistan	11–0	Tajikistan	Tashkent, Uzbekistan
16:00 UTC+5	Karachik 11', 13', 25', 54'; Kudratova 23', 71', 86', 90'; Turdiboeva 48'; Khabibullaeva 72', 90+3'	Report		Stadium: Milliy Stadium; Attendance: 75; Referee: Sorour Saedi (IR Iran)

29 November 2018 2018 CAFA Women's Championship	Tajikistan	1–4	Iran	Tashkent, Uzbekistan
16:00 UTC+5	Kholnazarova 2'	Report	Ghasemi 10', 70'; Chahkandi 51'; Motevalli 87'	Stadium: Milliy Stadium; Attendance: 100; Referee: Khusnora Jumaeva (Uzbekistan)

1 December 2018 2018 CAFA Women's Championship	Afghanistan	0–5	Tajikistan	Tashkent, Uzbekistan
13:00 UTC+5		Report	Fozilova 17', 59'; Jumakhon 45', 84'; Khalimova 69'	Stadium: Milliy Stadium; Attendance: 100; Referee: Veronika Bernatskaya (Kyrgyz Republic)

=== 2019 ===
8 September 2019 2019 KFU Cup of Hope	Uzbekistan	12–0	Tajikistan	Karakol, Kyrgyzstan
13:00 UTC+6	Zoirova 2', 87'; Karachik 4', 30', 39'; Kudratova 29'; Nozimova 38', 60', 61', 85'; Khabibullaeva 69', 71'	Report		Stadium: Karakol Central Stadium; Referee: Veronika Bernatskaya (Kyrgyz Republic)

9 September 2019 2019 KFU Cup of Hope	Tajikistan	2–1	Kyrgyzstan	Karakol, Kyrgyzstan
17:00 UTC+6	Khudododova 11'; Razhabova 71'	Report	Toktobolotova 59'	Stadium: Karakol Central Stadium

10 September 2019 2019 KFU Cup of Hope	Nepal	1–0	Tajikistan	Karakol, Kyrgyzstan
17:00 UTC+6	Bhandari 86'	Report		Stadium: Karakol Central Stadium

12 September 2019 2019 KFU Cup of Hope	Tajikistan	0–2	Kyrgyzstan	Karakol, Kyrgyzstan
13:00 UTC+6		Report	Boronbekova 5'; Aitbaeva 83'	Stadium: Karakol Central Stadium

=== 2021 ===
19 September 2021 International Friendly	Tajikistan	0–0	Singapore	Hisor, Tajikistan
--:-- UTC+5		Report		Stadium: Hisor Central Stadium; Referee: Nodira Mirzoeva (Tajikistan)

26 September 2021 2022 AFC Women's Asian Cup qualifying Group B	Tajikistan	4–0	Maldives	Dushanbe, Tajikistan
18:00 UTC+5	Khalimova 2', 24'; Khudododova 14'; Sotnikova 58'	Report (FIFA); Report (AFC)		Stadium: Republican Central Stadium; Attendance: 300; Referee: Kim Yu-jeong (Korea Republic)

29 September 2021 2022 AFC Women's Asian Cup qualifying Group B	Vietnam	7–0	Tajikistan	Dushanbe, Tajikistan
18:00 UTC+5	Phạm Hải Yến 14', 73'; Nguyễn Thị Bích Thùy 42', 54'; Huỳnh Như 51' (pen.); Hoàng Thị Loan 84'; Nguyễn Thị Vạn 90'	Report (FIFA); Report (AFC)		Stadium: Republican Central Stadium; Attendance: 250; Referee: Pansa Chaisanit (Thailand)

=== 2022 ===
8 July 2022 2022 CAFA Women's Championship	Turkmenistan	1–1	Tajikistan	Dushanbe, Tajikistan
22:00 UTC+5	Pryannikova 65'	Report (AFC); Report (CAFA)	Mirzoeva 7'	Stadium: Republican Central Stadium; Attendance: 97; Referee: Malika Kadyrova (Kyrgyzstan)

11 July 2022 2022 CAFA Women's Championship	Tajikistan	0–6	Uzbekistan	Dushanbe, Tajikistan
22:00 UTC+5		Report (AFC); Report (CAFA)	Ablyakimova 8', 25'; Kudratova 10', 34', 41'; Mamatkarimova 64'	Stadium: Republican Central Stadium; Attendance: 150; Referee: Resul Mammedov (Turkmenistan)

14 July 2022 2022 CAFA Women's Championship	Iran	5–0	Tajikistan	Dushanbe, Tajikistan
22:00 UTC+5	Chatrenoor 2', 87'; Foroozandeh 31', 69'; Motevallitaher 38'	Report (AFC); Report (CAFA)		Stadium: Republican Central Stadium; Attendance: 135; Referee: Resul Mammedov (Turkmenistan)

20 July 2022 2022 CAFA Women's Championship	Tajikistan	0–1	Kyrgyzstan	Dushanbe, Tajikistan
22:00 UTC+5		Report (AFC); Report (CAFA)	Karataeva 20'	Stadium: Republican Central Stadium; Attendance: 500; Referee: Anna Sidorova (Uzbekistan)

=== 2023 ===
5 April 2023 2024 AFC Women's Olympic Qualifying Group E	Hong Kong	3–0	Tajikistan	Hisor, Tajikistan
19:00 UTC+5	Khudododova 7' (o.g.); Sin Chung Yee 45+1'; Tsang Lai Mae 88'	Report		Stadium: Hisor Central Stadium; Attendance: 50; Referee: Asaka Koizumi (Japan)

8 April 2023 2024 AFC Women's Olympic Qualifying Group E	Tajikistan	0–8	Philippines	Hisor, Tajikistan
19:00 UTC+5		Report	Harrison 26'; Annis 28'; Frilles 31'; Quezada 34'; Serrano 38'; Alcantara 45+2'; McDaniel 60', 88'	Stadium: Hisor Central Stadium; Referee: Asaka Koizumi (Japan)

11 April 2023 2024 AFC Women's Olympic Qualifying Group E	Tajikistan	0–1	Pakistan	Hisor, Tajikistan
19:00 UTC+5		Report	Malik 26'	Stadium: Hisor Central Stadium; Referee: Joanna Charaktis (Australia)

=== 2025 ===
23 February 2025 Friendly	Saudi Arabia	4–0	Tajikistan	Jeddah, Saudi Arabia
19:30 UTC+3	Tawfiq 2', 36'; Mobarak 55'; Mukhayzin 83' (pen.)	Report		Stadium: King Abdullah Sports City; Player of the Match: Seba Tawfiq

26 February 2025 Friendly	Saudi Arabia	3–0	Tajikistan	Jeddah, Saudi Arabia
19:30 UTC+3	Tawfiq 16'; Abualsamh 50'; Mobarak 67'	Report		Stadium: King Abdullah Sports City; Player of the Match: Lana Abdulrazak

29 June 2026 AFC Women's Asian Cup qualification	North Korea	10–0	Tajikistan	Dushanbe, Tajikistan
22:00 UTC+5	Kim Kyong-yong 9', 39', 41', 45+4' (pen.); Myong Yu-jong 23'; Hong Song-ok 26'; Ri Hak 28', 36'; Han Jin-hong 54'; Kim Song-gyong 62' (pen.)	Report		Stadium: Pamir Stadium; Referee: Rawdha Almansoori (United Arab Emirates)

2 July 2026 AFC Women's Asian Cup qualification	Tajikistan	0–1	Malaysia	Dushanbe, Tajikistan
22:00 UTC+5		Report	Henrietta 90+2'	Referee: Trần Thị Thanh (Vietnam)

5 July 2026 AFC Women's Asian Cup qualification	Palestine	3–0	Tajikistan	Dushanbe, Tajikistan
22:00 UTC+5	Halim 49'; Youssef 69', 74'	Report

=== 2026 ===
5 March 2026 Friendly	United Arab Emirates	0–0	Tajikistan	Dubai, United Arab Emirates
20:00 UTC+4		Report; Report (FFT)	S. Saidova (penalty missed) 83'	Stadium: UAE Football Association Stadium

== See also ==
- Tajikistan national football team results
- Football in Tajikistan
