= Uzbekistan women's national football team results =

This article lists the results and fixtures for the Uzbekistan women's national football team.

The Uzbekistan women's national football team was founded in 1995.

== AFC Women's Asian Cup ==
Win Draw Lose Postponed/Cancelled Fixture

#	Year	Opponent	Result
1995 AFC Women's Championship
1	1995	India	1–0
2	1995	South Korea	0–6
3	1995	Japan	0–17
1997 AFC Women's Championship
4	1997	Philippines	2–1
5	1997	China	0–8
6	1997	North Korea	0–8
1999 AFC Women's Championship
7	1999	Japan	1–5
8	1999	Philippines	1–0
9	1999	Thailand	1–0
10	1999	Nepal	6–1
2001 AFC Women's Championship
11	2001	Philippines	5–0
12	2001	China	0–11
13	2001	Hong Kong	4–0
2003 AFC Women's Championship
14	2003	India	0–6
15	2003	Vietnam	2–4
16	2003	China	0–11
2026 AFC Women's Asian Cup
17	2026	North Korea	0–3
18	2026	China	0–3
19	2026	Bangladesh	4–0
20	2026	South Korea	0–6
21	2026	Philippines	0–2

== AFC Women's Asian Cup Qualification ==
#	Year	Opponent	Result
2006 AFC Women's Asian Cup qualification
1	2005	Maldives	6–0
2	2005	Hong Kong	3–0
3	2005	Myanmar	1–2
2010 AFC Women's Asian Cup qualification
4	2009	Maldives	5–0
5	2009	Palestine	5–0
6	2009	Kyrgyzstan	2–0
7	2009	Jordan	2–2
8	2009	Thailand	1–6
9	2009	Iran	4–1
2014 AFC Women's Asian Cup qualification
10	2013	Kuwait	18–0
11	2013	Lebanon	4–0
12	2013	Jordan	0–4
2018 AFC Women's Asian Cup qualification
13	2017	Hong Kong	2–1
14	2017	India	7–1
15	2017	North Korea	0–4
16	2017	South Korea	0–4
2022 AFC Women's Asian Cup qualification
17	2021	Mongolia	12–0
18	2021	South Korea	0–4
2026 AFC Women's Asian Cup qualification
18	2025	Sri Lanka	10–0
19	2025	Laos	7–0
20	2025	Nepal	3–3

== Olympic Games Qualification ==
#	Year	Opponent	Result
2008 Qualification
1	2007	Chinese Taipei	0–2
2	2007	Australia	0–10
3	2007	Myanmar	1–1
2012 Qualification
4	2011	Bangladesh	3–0
5	2011	India	1–1
6	2011	India	5–1
7	2011	Thailand	1–5
8	2011	Jordan	3–0
9	2011	Vietnam	2–1
10	2011	Iran	3–0
2016 Qualification
11	2015	Palestine	6–0
12	2015	Hong Kong	1–0
13	2015	Jordan	0–2
2020 Qualification
14	2019	Vietnam	1–2
15	2019	Jordan	2–0
16	2019	Hong Kong	5–1
2024 Qualification
17	2023	Bhutan	9–0
18	2023	Timor-Leste	3–0
19	2023	Jordan	7–0
20	2024	Australia	0–3
21	2024	Australia	0–10

== CAFA Championship ==
#	Year	Opponent	Result
2018 CAFA Women's Championship
1	2018	Afghanistan	20–0
2	2018	Tajikistan	11–0
3	2018	Iran	2–1
4	2018	Kyrgyzstan	10–0
2022 CAFA Women's Championship
5	2022	Tajikistan	6–0
6	2022	Turkmenistan	6–0
7	2022	Kyrgyzstan	7–0
8	2022	Iran	1–0

== Turkish Women's Cup ==
#	Year	Opponent	Result
2019 Turkish Women's Cup
1	2019	India	1–0
2	2019	Romania	0–1
3	2019	Turkmenistan	11–1
4	2019	Northern Ireland	1–2
2021 Turkish Women's Cup
5	2021	Equatorial Guinea	5–0
6	2021	Nigeria	0–1
2022 Turkish Women's Cup
7	2022	Lithuania	1–0
8	2022	Ukraine	0–2
9	2022	Venezuela	0–0
2023 Turkish Women's Cup
9	2023	Slovenia	1–2
10	2023	South Africa	0–3
11	2023	Zambia	0–4

Exclude the match with (Russia) CSKA Moscow in 2021 Turkish Women's Cup.

== Yongchuan International Tournament ==
#	Year	Opponent	Result
2016 Yongchuan International Tournament
1	2016	Denmark	1–2
2	2016	China	1–4
3	2016	Iceland	0–1
2024 Yongchuan International Tournament
4	2024	Vietnam	0–2
5	2024	China	0–3
2025 Yongchuan International Tournament
6	2025	China	0–5
7	2025	Zambia	3–4

Denmark probably not national team.

== Friendly ==
#	Year	Opponent	Result
Friendly 2007
1	2007	Thailand	1–2
Friendly 2012
2	2012	Vietnam	1–2
Friendly 2015
3	2015	Iran	1–0
4	2015	Iran	0–0
Friendly 2017
5	2017	United Arab Emirates	8–1
6	2017	United Arab Emirates	5–0
Friendly 2019
7	2019	India	5–1
8	2019	India	1–1
Friendly 2021
9	2021	India	1–0
10	2021	Belarus	1–3
11	2021	Iran	5–0
12	2021	Belarus	1–1
13	2021	Iran	2–0
14	2021	Iran	1–1
Friendly 2026
15	2026	Vietnam	0–1
16	2026	Vietnam	6–2

- Tri-Nations Tournament in Uzbekistan April 2021: Uzbekistan, Belarus, India
- Tri-Nations Tournament in Belarus June 2021: Uzbekistan, Belarus, Iran

== 2021 ==
11 June Friendly	Uzbekistan	5–0	Iran	Minsk, Belarus
		Report (SW)

14 June Friendly	Belarus	1–1	Uzbekistan	Belarus
		Report (SW)

20 September 2022 AFC Women's Asian Cup qualification Group E	Uzbekistan	12–0	Mongolia	Tashkent, Uzbekistan
19:00 UTC+5	Karachik 15'; Khabibullaeva 20', 22', 53'; Kudratova 27', 60'; Altantuya 31' (o.g.); Sarikova 47', 63', 83'; Galimova 72'; Shoyimova 74'	Report		Stadium: Pakhtakor Stadium; Attendance: 0 Referee: Ranjita Devi Tekcham (India)

23 September 2022 AFC Women's Asian Cup qualification Group E	South Korea	4–0	Uzbekistan	Tashkent, Uzbekistan
19:00 UTC+5	Kamoltoeva 17' (o.g.) Choe Yu-ri 52' Moon Mi-ra 88', 90+4'			Stadium: Pakhtakor Stadium; Attendance: 0

== 2022 ==
16 February Turkish Women's Cup	Uzbekistan	1–0	Lithuania	Alanya
		Report		Stadium: Goldcity Sport Complex

19 February Turkish Women's Cup	Ukraine	2–0	Uzbekistan	Alanya
	Ovdiychuk 49'; Apanashchenko 66'			Stadium: Goldcity Sport Complex

22 February Turkish Women's Cup	Uzbekistan	0–0	Venezuela	Alanya
				Stadium: Goldcity Sport Complex

9 April Friendly	United States	9–1	Uzbekistan	Columbus, United States
17:30 ET	Sullivan 26'; Pugh 27'; Smith 33', 35', 56'; Macario 46'; Howell 64'; Hatch 86'; Sanchez 90'	Report	Norboeva 70'	Stadium: Lower.com Field; Attendance: 12,071; Referee: Katja Koroleva (United States)

12 April Friendly	United States	9–0	Uzbekistan	Chester, Pennsylvania
19:00 ET	Zaripova 1' (o.g.); Macario 12', 45+2'; Pugh 14'; Lavelle 25', 27'; Rodman 71'; Purce 85'; Sanchez 90'	Report		Stadium: Subaru Park; Attendance: 11,373; Referee: Natalie Simon (United States)

11 July 2022 CAFA Women's Championship	Tajikistan	0–6	Uzbekistan	Dushanbe, Tajikistan
22:00		afc.com/en/more/cafa_womens_championship/news/uzbekistan_set_pace_with_victory_over_tajikistan_turkmenistan_hold_kyrgyz_republic.html Report (AFC); Report (CAFA)	Ablyakimova 8', 25'; Kudratova 10', 34', 41'; Mamatkarimova 64'	Stadium: Republic Central Stadium; Attendance: 150; Referee: Resul Mammedov (Turkmenistan)

14 July 2022 CAFA Women's Championship	Uzbekistan	6–0	Turkmenistan	Dushanbe, Tajikistan
19:00	Zaynitdinova 6'; Mamatkarimova 50', 58'; Norboeva 64'; Zaripova 79'; Khusniddinova 90+2'	Report (AFC); Report (CAFA)		Stadium: Republic Central Stadium; Attendance: 87; Referee: Nodira Mirzoeva (Tajikistan)

17 July 2022 CAFA Women's Championship	Kyrgyzstan	0–7	Uzbekistan	Dushanbe, Tajikistan
22:00		Report (AFC); Report (CAFA)	Kudratova 6', 39'; Irisboeva 10', 56'; Khikmatova 45+1'; Khabibullaeva 78'; Mamatkarimova 81'	Stadium: Republic Central Stadium; Attendance: 100; Referee: Mahsa Ghorbani (Iran)

20 July 2022 CAFA Women's Championship	Uzbekistan	1–0	Iran	Dushanbe, Tajikistan
19:00	Shoyimova 86'	Report (AFC); Report (CAFA)		Stadium: Republic Central Stadium; Attendance: 200; Referee: Malika Kadyrova (Kyrgyzstan)

11 November Friendly	Hungary	3–0	Uzbekistan	Szombathely, Hungary
18:00 UTC+1	Zeller 26'; Papp 34'; Csiki 70'	Report		Stadium: Haladás Sportkomplexum

15 November Friendly	Hungary	5–0	Uzbekistan	Szombathely, Hungary
18:00 UTC+1	Vágó 22'; Pápai 35'; Pusztai 51'; Szabó 62'; Kaján 81'	Report		Stadium: Haladás Sportkomplexum

== 2023 ==
15 February 2023 Turkish Women's Cup	Slovenia	2–1	Uzbekistan	Alanya, Turkey
21:00 UTC+3	Prasnikar 32'; Erman 67'		Karachik 72'	Stadium: Miracle Sport Complex, Alanya; Referee: Melis Özçiğdem (Turkiye)

18 February 2023 Turkish Women's Cup	South Africa	3–0	Uzbekistan	Alanya, Turkey
17:00 UTC+3	Seoposenwe 10'; Tojiddinova 13' (o.g.); Cesane 25'			Stadium: Miracle Sport Complex

21 February 2023 Turkish Women's Cup	Uzbekistan	0–4	Zambia	Alanya, Turkey
13:00 UTC+3			Chanda 10'; Nachula 59'; Kundananji 61'; Banda 68'	Stadium: Miracle Sport Complex

28 March Friendly	Uzbekistan	3–2	India	Tashkent, Uzbekistan
17:00 UTC+5	Khabibullaeva 7'; Karachik 25' (pen.); Zaripova 90+2'	Report	Dangmei 24'; Kathiresan 62'	Stadium: Pakhtakor Central Stadium

5 April 2024 Olympic Qualifiers Round 1	Uzbekistan	9–0	Bhutan	Tashkent, Uzbekistan
17:00 UTC+5	Khabibullaeva 2', 20', 45+1', 48', 73'; Karachik 30', 42'; Norboeva 51'; Shoyimova 90+1'	Report		Stadium: Milliy Stadium; Attendance: 145; Referee: Azusa Sugino (Japan)

8 April 2024 Olympic Qualifiers Round 1	Timor-Leste	0–3	Uzbekistan	Tashkent, Uzbekistan
17:00 UTC+5		Report	Nabikulova 59'; Zoirova 70'; Shoyimova 79'	Stadium: Milliy Stadium

11 April 2024 Olympic Qualifiers Round 1	Uzbekistan	7–0	Jordan	Tashkent, Uzbekistan
17:00 UTC+5	Zoirova 9'; Ablyakimova 18'; Khabibullaeva 44', 49', 63'; Kudratova 56', 58'	Report		Stadium: Milliy Stadium; Referee: Azusa Sugino (Japan)

14 July Friendly	Belarus	4–1	Uzbekistan

17 July Friendly	Belarus	1–2	Uzbekistan

25 September 2022 Asian Games	Mongolia	0–6	Uzbekistan	Hangzhou, China
19:30 UTC+8		Report	Norboeva 38'; Tojiddinova 45'; Shoyimova 58'; Khabibullaeva 78', 90+5'; Kudratova 85'	Stadium: Linping Sports Center Stadium; Attendance: 6841; Referee: TEKCHAM RD (India)

28 September Asian Games	China	6–0	Uzbekistan	Hangzhou, China
19:30 UTC+8				Stadium: Linping Sports Center Stadium

30 September 2022 Asian Games QF	Chinese Taipei	1–2 (a.e.t.)	Uzbekistan	Wenzhou, China
15:00 UTC+8	Su Yu-hsuan 88'	Report	Khabibullaeva 55'; Zoirova 101'	Stadium: Linping Sports Center Stadium; Attendance: 7,515; Referee: Law Bik Chi (Hong Kong)

3 October 2022 Asian Games SF	Uzbekistan	0–8	North Korea	Hangzhou, China
18:00 UTC+8		Report	Hong Song-ok 9'; Kim Kyong-yong 18' (pen.), 46', 63', 83'; An Myong-Song 45+2'; Ri Hak 50'; Kim Hye-yong 90+1'	Stadium: Shangcheng Sports Centre Stadium; Attendance: 10,402; Referee: Le Thi Ly (Vietnam)

6 October 2022 Asian Games 3rd place	China	7–0	Uzbekistan	Hangzhou, China
15:00 UTC+8	Ou Yiyao 1'; Chen Qiaozhu 26', 62'; Wang Shanshan 45'; Wu Ri Gu Mu La 59'; Gu Yasha 65'; Yao Wei 67'			Stadium: Huanglong Sports Centre Stadium

26 October 2024 Olympic Qualifiers Round 2	Vietnam	0–1	Uzbekistan	Tashkent, Uzbekistan
17:00 5:00				Stadium: Bunyodkor Stadium

29 October 2024 Olympic Qualifiers Round 2	Uzbekistan	0–2	Japan	Tashkent, Uzbekistan
17:00 5:00				Stadium: Bunyodkor Stadium

1 November 2024 Olympic Qualifiers Round 2	Uzbekistan	3–0	India	Tashkent, Uzbekistan
17:00 5:00				Stadium: Bunyodkor Stadium

== 2024 ==
1 February Friendly	Morocco	2–0	Uzbekistan	Salé, Morocco
10:00 UTC+1	Chebbak 24', 55'			Stadium: Mohammed VI Sport Complex

7 February Friendly	Morocco	1–0	Uzbekistan	Salé, Morocco
16:00 UTC+1	Benzina 30'	report (UFA)		Stadium: Mohammed VI Sport Complex

24 February 2024 Olympic Qualifiers Round 3	Uzbekistan	0–3	Australia	Tashkent, Uzbekistan
14:00 UTC+5		Report	Heyman 72'; Fowler 84'; Foord 86'	Stadium: Milliy Stadium; Attendance: 2,347; Referee: Oh Hyeon-jeong (South Korea)

28 February 2024 Olympic Qualifiers Round 3	Australia	10–0 (13–0 agg.)	Uzbekistan	Melbourne, Australia
20:00 UTC+11	Asadova 1' (o.g.); Heyman 4', 8', 16', 45+2'; Torpey 22'; Fowler 36'; Foord 38'; Raso 68'; Sayer 90+4'	Report		Stadium: Marvel Stadium; Attendance: 54,120

31 May Friendly	Uzbekistan	3–0	India	Tashkent, Uzbekistan
17:00 UTC+5	Khabibullaeva 49' (pen.), 77', 89'	Report		Stadium: Milliy Stadium

4 June Friendly	Uzbekistan	0–0	India	Tashkent, Uzbekistan
17:30 UTC+5				Stadium: TDTU Stadium

5 July Friendly	France	5–0	Uzbekistan	Clairefontaine, France
18:00 UTC+5		Report		Stadium: CNFE Clairefontaine

23 October 2024 Yongchuan International Tournament	Vietnam	2–0	Uzbekistan	Chongqing, China
15:30 UTC+8				Stadium: Yongchuan Sports Center

26 October Yongchuan International Tournament	China	3–0	Uzbekistan	Chongqing, China
19:35 UTC+8				Stadium: Yongchuan Sports Center

30 November Friendly	Uzbekistan	0–1	Belarus	Tashkent, Uzbekistan
15:00 UTC+5			Kozyupa 47'	Stadium: UFA Football Pitch

3 December Friendly	Uzbekistan	0–3	Belarus	Tashkent, Uzbekistan
15:00 UTC+5			Kozyupa 47'	Stadium: UFA Football Pitch

== 2025 ==
20 February Pink Ladies Cup	South Korea	3–0	Uzbekistan	Al Hamriyah, UAE
11:00 GST (UTC+4)	Choo Hyo-joo 42', 45+3'; Choe Yu-ri 90+2'	Report		Stadium: Hamriyah CSC Stadium

23 February Pink Ladies Cup	Jordan	0–1	Uzbekistan	Al Hamriyah, UAE
11:00 GST (UTC+4)		Report	Mamatkulova 86'	Stadium: Hamriyah CSC Stadium

26 February Pink Ladies Cup	Uzbekistan	0–0	Thailand	Al Hamriyah, UAE
15:00 GST (UTC+4)				Stadium: Hamriyah CSC Stadium

5 April Yongchuan International Tournament	China	5–0	Uzbekistan	Chongqing, China
15:30 UTC+8	Zhang Xin 43'; Shao Ziqin 45+2'; Li Mengwen 69'; Liu Ying 88' (pen.); Wang Yanwen 90'			Stadium: Yongchuan Sports Center; Referee: Azusa Sugino (Japan)

8 April Yongchuan International Tournament	Uzbekistan	3–4	Zambia	Chongqing, China
--:-- UTC+8	Turdiboeva 51'; Khabibullaeva 90+3', 90+4'		Lungu 24'; Chipasula 26'; Mukoma 46'; Mupopo 73'	Stadium: Yongchuan Sports Center

30 May Friendly	India	0–1	Uzbekistan	Bengaluru, India
16:30			Khabibullaeva 56'	Stadium: Padukone-Dravid Centre for Sports Excellence

3 June Friendly	India	0–1	Uzbekistan	Bengaluru, India
16:30			Kudratova 49'	Stadium: Padukone-Dravid Centre for Sports Excellence

24 June Friendly	Uzbekistan	4–0	Palestine	Tashkent, Uzbekistan
20:00 UTC+5	Shoyimova 8'; Khabibullaeva 31'; Karachik 40'; Ergasheva 45+1'			Stadium: Do'stlik Stadion

29 June 2026 AFC Women's Asian Cup qualification	Uzbekistan	10–0	Sri Lanka	Tashkent, Uzbekistan
20:00 UTC+5	Kudratova 3', 7', 52', 73'; Karachik 18', 20'; Khabibullaeva 31', 87', 88'; Shoyimova 68'	Report		Stadium: Milliy Stadium; Referee: Asaka Koizumi (Japan)

2 July 2026 AFC Women's Asian Cup qualification	Laos	0–7	Uzbekistan	Tashkent, Uzbekistan
20:00 UTC+5		Report	Khabibullaeva 23'; Zoirova 34'; Kudratova 48', 90+3'; Shoyimova 81', 90+2'; Aminjonova 85'	Stadium: Milliy Stadium; Referee: Bùi Thị Thu Trang (Vietnam)

5 July 2026 AFC Women's Asian Cup qualification	Uzbekistan	3–3 (4–2 p)	Nepal	Tashkent, Uzbekistan
20:00 UTC+5	Khabibullaeva 2'; Karachik 11'; Shoyimova 39'	Report	Bhandari 24', 73'; Rana 71'	Stadium: Milliy Stadium; Referee: Asaka Koizumi (Japan)
	Penalties
	Shoyimova (penalty scored); Zoirova (penalty scored); Khikmatova (penalty scored); Aminjonova (penalty scored)		(penalty missed) Bhandari; (penalty scored) Rana; (penalty scored) S. Magar; (penalty missed) A. Magar

== 2026 ==
27 January Friendly	Vietnam	0–1	Uzbekistan	Hanoi, Vietnam
--:-- UTC+7	Nguyễn Thị Bích Thùy 59'	Report

30 January Friendly	Vietnam	2–6	Uzbekistan	Hanoi, Vietnam
--:-- UTC+7

3 March 2026 AFC Women's Asian Cup	North Korea	3–0	Uzbekistan	Sydney, Australia
13:00 UTC+11	Myong Yu-jong 6', 24' (pen.), 41' (pen.)	Report (AFC); Report (FIFA)		Stadium: Western Sydney Stadium; Attendance: 1,268; Referee: Casey Reibelt (Australia)

6 March 2026 AFC Women's Asian Cup	Uzbekistan	0–3	China	Sydney, Australia
19:00 UTC+11		Report (AFC); Report (FIFA)	Shao Ziqin 30' (pen.); Li Qingtong 51', 77'	Stadium: Western Sydney Stadium; Attendance: 8,322; Referee: Supiree Testhomya (Thailand)

9 March 2026 AFC Women's Asian Cup	Bangladesh	0-4	Uzbekistan	Perth, Australia
17:00 UTC+8		Report (AFC); Report (FIFA)	Khabibullaeva 10'; Nozimova 62', 66'; Kudratova 88'	Stadium: Perth Rectangular Stadium; Attendance: 1,117; Referee: Mahnaz Zokaee (Iran)

14 March 2026 AFC Women's Asian Cup	South Korea	6-0	Uzbekistan	Sydney, Australia
20:00 UTC+8	Son Hwa-yeon 9'; Ko Yoo-jin 20'; Park Soo-jeong 57'; Ji So-yun 72'; Lee Eun-young 85'; Jang Sel-gi 90+3' (pen.)	Report (AFC); Report (FIFA)		Stadium: Stadium Australia; Attendance: 12,974; Referee: Lara Lee (Australia)

19 March 2026 AFC Women's Asian Cup	Uzbekistan	0-2	Philippines	Gold Coast, Australia
19:00 UTC+10		Report (AFC); Report (FIFA)	Beard 47'; Sawicki 52'	Stadium: Gold Coast Stadium; Attendance: 1,922; Referee: Casey Reibelt (Australia)

== See also ==
- Uzbekistan women's national football team
- List of Uzbekistan women's international footballers
- Uzbekistan women's national under-20 football team
- Uzbekistan women's national under-17 football team
