= Mongolia women's national football team results =

The Mongolia women's national football team represents Mongolia in international football under the control of the Mongolian Football Federation (MFF). Founded in 1959, the federation fielded its first senior women's national side for the 2019 EAFF E-1 Football Championship. Mongolia went on to earn a victory in its first-ever match, a 3–2 result over the Northern Mariana Islands.

The following is a list of the team's official results.

== 2018 ==
3 September 2018 EAFF E-1 Football Championship	Mongolia	3–2	Northern Mariana Islands	Ulaanbaatar, Mongolia
17:00	Narmandakh Namuunaa 51', 82'; Tsolmon Ganchimeg 61'	Report	Gianna Griffin 11'; Jeralyn Castillo 21'	Stadium: National Stadium; Attendance: 421; Referee: Yu Hong (China)

5 September 2018 EAFF E-1 Football Championship	Mongolia	1–0	Guam	Ulaanbaatar, Mongolia
17:00	Sarangarav Otgonbaatar 90+1'	Report		Stadium: MFF Football Centre, Ulaanbaatar; Attendance: 178; Referee: Law Bik Chi (Hong Kong)

7 September 2018 EAFF E-1 Football Championship	Mongolia	0–0	Macau	Ulaanbaatar, Mongolia
17:00		Report		Stadium: MFF Football Centre, Ulaanbaatar; Attendance: 394; Referee: Cha Min-ji (South Korea)

4 November 2018 2020 AFC Women's Olympic Qualification	Tajikistan	4–1	Mongolia	Hisor, Tajikistan
16:00	Laylo Khalimova 9'; Gulsunbi Khalimova 53'; Madina Fozilova 65' (pen.), 69'	Report	Tsasan-Okhin Orgodol 32'	Stadium: Hisor Central Stadium; Attendance: 50; Referee: Kate Jacewicz (Australia)

6 November 2018 2020 AFC Women's Olympic Qualification	Singapore	2–2	Mongolia	Hisor, Tajikistan
13:00	Angeline Chua 68'; Raudhah Kamis 87'	Report	Namuun Bayarsaikhan 4'; Tuvshinjargal Undral 38'	Stadium: Hisor Central Stadium; Attendance: 50; Referee: Bùi Thị Thu Trang (Vietnam)

8 November 2018 2020 AFC Women's Olympic Qualification	Chinese Taipei	9–0	Mongolia	Hisor, Tajikistan
13:00	Michelle Pao 29'; Hsu Yi-yun 39'; Lee Hsiu-chin 40'; Yu Hsiu-chin 42' (pen.), 49', 52'; Chen Yen-ping 72', 86'; Lin Ya-han 90+2'	Report		Stadium: Hisor Central Stadium; Attendance: 30; Referee: Doumouh Al-Bakkar (Lebanon)

11 November 2018 2020 AFC Women's Olympic Qualification	Philippines	5–1	Mongolia	Hisor, Tajikistan
13:00	Shelah Mae Cadag 8', 15', 85'; Camille Rodriguez 60'; Kyla Inquig 81'	Report	Undrakh Ulziibayar 45+2' (pen.)	Stadium: Hisor Central Stadium; Attendance: 30; Referee: Bùi Thị Thu Trang (Vietnam)

1 December 2018 EAFF E-1 Football Championship	China	10–0	Mongolia	Dededo, Guam
15:45	Wang Shanshan 4', 17', 25', 58'; Li Jiayue 15'; Zhang Rui 22'; Li Ying 28'; Lou Jiahui 43'; Yang Lina 45'; Yao Wei 89'	Report		Stadium: Guam Football Association National Training Center; Attendance: 150; Referee: Karen Abt (United States)

3 December 2018 EAFF E-1 Football Championship	Chinese Taipei	6–0	Mongolia	Dededo, Guam
15:45	Lee Hsiu-chin 15', 28', 52', 79'; Lai Li-chin 58'; Chen Ying-hui 75'	Report		Stadium: Guam Football Association National Training Center; Attendance: 125; Referee: Karen Abt (United States)

5 December 2018 EAFF E-1 Football Championship	Hong Kong	3–0	Mongolia	Dededo, Guam
11:00	Kwong Wing Yan 43', 45+1'; Cheung Wai Ki 77'	Report		Stadium: Guam Football Association National Training Center; Attendance: 100; Referee: Fusako Kajiyama (Japan)

== 2021 ==
17 September 2021 2022 AFC Women's Asian Cup qualification	South Korea	12–0	Mongolia	Tashkent, Uzbekistan
19:00 UTC+5	Choo Hyo-joo 4', 44'; Cho So-hyun 24', 54'; Lee Geum-min 30', 41'; Lee Min-a 32'; Ji So-yun 35'; Moon Mi-ra 67', 81', 89'; Park Ye-eun 88'	Report		Stadium: Pakhtakor Stadium; Attendance: 0 Referee: Asaka Koizumi (Japan)

20 September 2021 2022 AFC Women's Asian Cup qualification	Uzbekistan	12–0	Mongolia	Tashkent, Uzbekistan
19:00 UTC+5	Karachik 15'; Khabibullaeva 20', 22', 53'; Kudratova 27', 60'; Altantuya 31' (o.g.); Sarikova 47', 63', 83'; Galimova 72'; Shoyimova 74'	Report		Stadium: Pakhtakor Stadium; Attendance: 0 Referee: Ranjita Devi Tekcham (India)

== 2023 ==
4 April 2023 2024 AFC Olympic Qualification	Mongolia	2–2	Singapore	Chonburi, Thailand
17:00 UTC+7	Namuunaa 2', 90+3'	Report	Danelle Tan 42'; Nur Izzati 78'	Stadium: Chonburi Stadium; Attendance: 50; Referee: Nodira Mirzoeva (Tajikistan)

7 April 2023 2024 AFC Olympic Qualification	Thailand	6–0	Mongolia	Chonburi, Thailand
17:00 UTC+7	Nutwadee 11'; Pattaranan 16'; Ploychompoo 27'; Orawan 50'; Jiraporn 68' (pen.), 90+1'	Report		Stadium: Chonburi Stadium; Referee: Yu Hong (China)

22 September 2023 2022 Asian Games	Mongolia	0–16	China	Hangzhou, China
19:30 UTC+8		Report	Wang Shuang 2', 19', 26', 37'; Wang Shanshan 8', 31', 59'; Liu Yanqiu 24', 39'; Jin Jin Yan 50', 84'; Wu Rigumula 57', 86'; Yiyao Ou 73'; Zhang Xin 76', 90+2'	Stadium: Linping Sports Center Stadium; Attendance: : 6910; Referee: Mahnaz Zokaee (Iran)

25 September 2023 2022 Asian Games	Mongolia	0–6	Uzbekistan	Hangzhou, China
19:30 UTC+8		Report	Norboeva 38'; Tojiddinova 45'; Shoyimova 58'; Khabibullaeva 78', 90+5'; Kudratova 85'	Stadium: Linping Sports Center Stadium; Attendance: 6841; Referee: TEKCHAM RD (India)

30 November 2023 2025 EAFF E-1 Football Championship PR	Mongolia	3–4	Northern Mariana Islands	Zhuhai, China
10:00	Batjargal 35'; Orogdol 60'; Bayarsaikhan 71'	Report	Chavez 23', 69'; Casarino 40', 90+4' (pen.)	Stadium: Suoka Sports Training Base Pitch 2 Referee: Cha Min-ji (Korea Republic)

2 December 2023 2025 EAFF E-1 Football Championship PR	North Korea	19–0	Mongolia	Zhuhai, China
16:00 UTC+8	Kim Chung-mi 4', 26', 83'; Hong Song-ok 6', 19', 75'; Han Jin-hong 9'; Kim Jong-sim 12', 53'; Song Chun-sim 14'; Pong Song-ae 16', 90'; Ju Hyo-sim 51' (pen.); Kim Hye-yong 55', 65'; Ri Su-jong 69', 85', 87'; Myong Yu-jong 80'	Report		Stadium: Suoka Sports Training Base Pitch 2 Referee: Tien Jin (China)

4 December 2023 2025 EAFF E-1 Football Championship PR	Hong Kong	6–0	Mongolia	Zhuhai, China
13:00	Cheung Wai Ki 5', 49'; Wei Lan 26'; Khishigtsengel 31' (o.g.); Chan Wing Sze 48'; Chu Po Yan 67'	Report		Stadium: Suoka Sports Training Base Pitch 1 Referee: Tian Jin (China)

== 2025 ==
23 June 2025 2026 AFC Asian Cup qualification	Mongolia	0–13	India	Chiang Mai, Thailand
16:00 UTC+7		Report	Basfore 8'; Guguloth 20', 59'; Xaxa 29', 45', 46', 52', 55'; Haldar 67'; Malavika P. 71'; Priyadharshini 73', 86'; Dangmei 75' (pen.)	Stadium: 700th Anniversary Stadium; Referee: Jon Sol-mi (North Korea)

26 June 2025 2026 AFC Asian Cup qualification	Iraq	5–2	Mongolia	Chiang Mai, Thailand
	Al-Jawahiri 9', 27', 46'; Al-Ghazawi 18'; Khalaf 34'	Report	Bayanmunkh 8'; Badamkhatan 25'	Stadium: 700th_Anniversary_Stadium; Referee: Pak Un-Jong (North Korea)

2 July 2026 AFC Asian Cup qualification	Mongolia	0–11	Thailand	Chiang Mai, Thailand
19:30 UTC+7		Report	Thawanrat 3', 90+2'; Saowalak 4'; Thanchanok 12', 45+1'; Pattaranan 29', 52', 79'; Karnjanathat 49' (pen.), 66', 90+3'	Stadium: 700th Anniversary Stadium; Referee: Nurul Ain Izatty (Malaysia)

5 July 2025 2026 AFC Asian Cup qualification	Timor-Leste	3–1	Mongolia	Chiang Mai, Thailand
16:00 UTC+7	V. Fernandes 29'; Da Conceição 56'; Costa 62'	Report	B. da Costa 11' (o.g.)	Stadium: 700th Anniversary Stadium; Referee: Doumouh Al-Bakkar (Lebanon)

== All-time record ==
Key

- Pld = Matches played
- W = Matches won
- D = Matches drawn
- L = Matches lost
- GF = Goals for
- GA = Goals against
- GD = Goal differential
- Countries are listed in alphabetical order

As of 3 November 2025

Positive Record Neutral Record Negative Record

Opponent	Pld	W	D	L	GF	GA	GD
China	2	0	0	2	0	26	-16
Chinese Taipei	2	0	0	2	0	15	-15
Guam	1	1	0	0	1	0	1
Hong Kong	2	0	0	2	0	9	-9
India	1	0	0	1	0	13	-13
Iraq	1	0	0	1	2	5	-3
Macau	1	0	1	0	0	0	0
North Korea	1	0	0	1	0	19	-19
Northern Mariana Islands	2	1	0	1	6	6	0
Philippines	1	0	0	1	1	5	-4
Singapore	2	0	2	0	4	4	0
South Korea	1	0	0	1	0	12	-12
Tajikistan	1	0	0	1	1	4	-3
Thailand	2	0	0	2	0	17	-17
Timor-Leste	1	0	0	1	1	3	-2
Uzbekistan	2	0	0	2	0	18	-18
Total	23	2	3	18	16	156	−140
