= List of Tajikistan women's international footballers =

The Tajikistan women's national football team (Note: Russian: Женская сборная Таджикистана по футболу, romanized: Zhenskaya sbornaya Tadzhikistana po futbolu, Tajik: Дастаи мунтахаби занонаи футболи Тоҷикистон, romanized: Dastai muntaxaʙi zanonai futʙoli Toçikiston) represents Tajikistan in international women's association football. It is fielded by the Tajikistan Football Federation (FFT), the governing body of football in Tajikistan, and competes as a member of the Asian Football Confederation.

The team played its first FIFA-sanctioned official international match on 3 April 2017 against the Iraq.

== List of players ==
Note: Players are listed by the number of caps, then the number of goals scored. Players are listed alphabetically if the number of goals is equal.

- This list features FIFA-sanctioned matches only (excluding 2018 Asian Games Matches against China, North Korea and Kong Kong).

Key
§	Player is active in international football and was called up to the team in last 12 months
§	Player haven't been called up in last 12 months, but is still available for selection

Player	Caps	Goals	First cap	Last cap	Ref
Laylo Khalimova	20	4	v. Iraq, 2017	v. Pakistan, 2023	
Munisa Mirzoeva	19	1	v. Iraq, 2017	v. Kyrgyzstan, 2022	
Nekubakht Khudododova	17	1	v. Mongolia, 2018	v. Pakistan, 2023	
Marjona Fayzulloeva	16	0	v. Iraq, 2017	v. Pakistan, 2023	
Madina Fozilova	14	6	v. Mongolia, 2018	v. Kyrgyzstan, 2022	
Sakhina Saidova	14	0	v. Iraq, 2017	v. Kyrgyzstan, 2022	
Jumakhon Shukronai	13	2	v. Iraq, 2017	v. Afghanistan, 2018	
Sayramjon Kholnazarova	13	1	v. Iraq, 2017	v. Afghanistan, 2018	
Nodira Mirzoeva	13	0	v. Iraq, 2017	v. Afghanistan, 2018	
Zulaikho Safarova	13	0	v. Bahrain, 2017	v. Vietnam, 2021	
Nasiba Olimova	10	0	v. Iraq, 2017	v. Afghanistan, 2018	
Benazir Jumakhonzoda	9	0	v. Maldives, 2021	v. Pakistan, 2023	
Saiyora Saidova	9	0	v. Maldives, 2021	v. Pakistan, 2023	
Shamsiya Khuseinova	9	0	v. Maldives, 2021	v. Pakistan, 2023	
Madina Davlyatova	9	0	v. Maldives, 2021	v. Pakistan, 2023	
Dzhonona Kurbonova	8	0	v. Vietnam, 2021	v. Pakistan, 2023	
Karina Mirzoeva	8	0	v. Vietnam, 2021	v. Pakistan, 2023	
Niso Abdulloeva	8	0	v. Maldives, 2021	v. Pakistan, 2023	
Iroda Juraeva	8	0	v. Iraq, 2017	v. Iran, 2018	
Mavjuda Safarova	8	0	v. Iraq, 2017	v. Afghanistan, 2018	
Komila Rasulova	7	0	v. Turkmenistan, 2022	v. Pakistan, 2023	
Marjona Saidova	7	0	v. Turkmenistan, 2022	v. Pakistan, 2023	
Natalia Sotnikova	7	2	v. Iraq, 2017	v. Vietnam, 2021	
Zeboniso Abdulloeva	7	0	v. Mongolia, 2018	v. Afghanistan, 2018	
Muattara Rakhmatulloeva	6	0	v. Philippines, 2018	v. Afghanistan, 2018	
Jonona Halimova	5	1	v. Iraq, 2017	v. United Arab Emirates, 2017	
Dilafruz Sharipova	5	0	v. Iraq, 2017	v. United Arab Emirates, 2017	
Farkhod Zukhali	5	0	v. Philippines, 2018	v. Afghanistan, 2018	
Madinai Iskandari	5	1	v. Iraq, 2017	v. United Arab Emirates, 2017	
Gulsunbi Khalimova	4	7	v. Mongolia, 2018	v. Singapore, 2018	
Shakhnoza Boboeva	4	0	v. Turkmenistan, 2022	v. Pakistan, 2023	
Manizhai Fozilzoda	4	0	v. Turkmenistan, 2022	v. Kyrgyzstan, 2022	
Nargiza Boboeva	4	0	v. Kyrgyzstan, 2018	v. Afghanistan, 2018	
Mehrangezi Sharifzoda	2	0	v. Vietnam, 2021	v. Turkmenistan, 2022	
Malika Kayumova	2	0	v. Maldives, 2021	v. Vietnam, 2021	
Zuhro Bobomurodova	2	0	v. Iran, 2022	v. Philippines, 2023	
Dildora Imomalieva	2	0	v. Philippines, 2023	v. Pakistan, 2023	
Jonona Nazarova	2	0	v. Hong Kong, 2023	v. Philippines, 2023	
Adolatkhon Komilova	1	0	v. Afghanistan, 2018	v. Afghanistan, 2018	
Dilnoza Nurova	1	0	v. Uzbekistan, 2018	v. Uzbekistan, 2018	
Evgeniya Eyzinger	1	0	v. Jordan, 2017	v. Jordan, 2017	
Gulafshon Saraeva	1	0	v. Uzbekistan, 2018	v. Uzbekistan, 2018	
Lailo Kuchkinova	1	0	v. Maldives, 2021	v. Maldives, 2021	
Ruziguli Hasan	1	0	v. Uzbekistan, 2022	v. Uzbekistan, 2022	
Munisa Gulova	1	0	v. Philippines, 2023	v. Philippines, 2023	
Charoskhon Normurodova	1	0	v. Hong Kong, 2023	v. Hong Kong, 2023	
Bibioisha Isoqova	1	0	v. Hong Kong, 2023	v. Hong Kong, 2023	

== See also ==
- Tajikistan women's national football team
- Category:Tajikistani women's footballers
- Tajikistan women's national football team#Current squad
