= 2023 CAFA Women's Futsal Championship squads =

the 2023 CAFA Women's Futsal Championship is an international women's futsal tournament to be held in Tashkent, Uzbekistan from 25 to 31 January 2023. The four women's national teams involved in the tournament were required by Central Asian Football Association (CAFA) to register a squad of 14 players, including at least two goalkeepers.

This article lists the women's national futsal squads that take part in the tournament. The age listed for each player is as of January 25, 2023, the first day of the tournament.

== Teams ==
=== Iran ===
Head coach: Forouzan Soleimani

No.	Pos.	Player	Date of birth (age)	Club
1	GK	Tahereh Mehdi Pour		(Football Federation Islamic Republic of Iran)
12	GK	Zeynab Karami		(Football Federation Islamic Republic of Iran)
2	FP	Nazanin Estekifar		(Football Federation Islamic Republic of Iran)
3	FP	Fatemeh Rahmati		(Football Federation Islamic Republic of Iran)
4	FP	Maryam hakmati		(Football Federation Islamic Republic of Iran)
5	FP	Sara Shirbeigi	6 August 1991 (aged 31)	(Football Federation Islamic Republic of Iran)
6	FP	Fereshteh Khosravi		(Football Federation Islamic Republic of Iran)
7	FP	Fereshteh Karimi	16 February 1989 (aged 33)	(Football Federation Islamic Republic of Iran)
8	FP	Elham Anafjeh	14 February 1998 (aged 24)	(Football Federation Islamic Republic of Iran)
9	FP	Mahsa Kamali	16 August 1994 (aged 28)	(Football Federation Islamic Republic of Iran)
10	FP	Ziba Afrough		(Football Federation Islamic Republic of Iran)
11	FP	Seyedehnastaran Moghimifarzi	16 July 1990 (aged 32)	(Football Federation Islamic Republic of Iran)
13	FP	Faremeh Etedadi	14 January 1989 (aged 34)	(Football Federation Islamic Republic of Iran)
14	FP	Maral Torkaman	26 November 2002 (aged 20)	(Football Federation Islamic Republic of Iran)

=== Kyrgyz Republic ===
Head coach: Oleg Gevlenko

No.	Pos.	Player	Date of birth (age)	Club
1	GK	Aikanysh Tentimisheva		(Kyrgyz Football Union)
13	GK	Natalia Gavoronskaia		(Kyrgyz Football Union)
2	FP	Nursuluu Murzakulova	20 January 2005 (aged 18)	(Kyrgyz Football Union) FC Alga Bishkek
3	FP	Sezim Kubanychbekova		(Kyrgyz Football Union)
4	FP	Aiturgan Kurmanbekova		(Kyrgyz Football Union)
5	FP	Bakhira Toktogul Kyzy		(Kyrgyz Football Union)
6	FP	Diana Kanatbekova		(Kyrgyz Football Union)
7	FP	Aidana Otorbaeva		(Kyrgyz Football Union)
8	FP	Aiturgan Askarova		(Kyrgyz Football Union)
9	FP	Nazik Kumyshbek Kyzy		(Kyrgyz Football Union)
10	FP	Kenzhebubu Yrysbek Kyzy		(Kyrgyz Football Union)
11	FP	Aizhan Boronbekova	31 March 2000 (aged 22)	(Uzbekistan Football Association) FC Bunyodkor
12	FP	Sezimay Beishembekova		(Kyrgyz Football Union)
14	FP	Tolgonai Almazbekova		(Kyrgyz Football Union)

=== Tajikistan ===
Head coach: (Iran) Mustafo Afshori

No.	Pos.	Player	Date of birth (age)	Club
1	GK	Saiyora Saidova	1 February 1998 (aged 24)	(Tajikistan Football Federation) Zeboniso WFC
2	GK	Ruziguli Hasan		(Tajikistan Football Federation) Zeboniso WFC
12	GK	Munisa Gulova		(Tajikistan Football Federation) Zeboniso WFC
3	FP	Laylo Khalimova	16 November 1997 (aged 25)	(Tajikistan Football Federation) Khatlon
4	FP	Karina Mirzoeva	12 March 2004 (aged 18)	(Tajikistan Football Federation) Zeboniso WFC
5	FP	Benazir Jumakhonzoda	27 October 2001 (aged 21)	(Tajikistan Football Federation) Khatlon
6	FP	Shamsiya Khuseinova	15 December 1996 (aged 26)	(Tajikistan Football Federation) Zeboniso WFC
7	FP	Komila Rasulova	18 November 2001 (aged 21)	(Russian Football Union) SSHOR No.27 Sokol Moskva
8	FP	Niso Abdulloeva	24 December 2003 (aged 19)	(Tajikistan Football Federation) Zeboniso WFC
9	FP	Nekubakht Khudododova	23 February 2002 (aged 20)	(Tajikistan Football Federation) Zeboniso WFC
10	FP	Malika Kayumova	10 March 2005 (aged 17)	(Tajikistan Football Federation) Zeboniso WFC
11	FP	Madina Fozilova	1 May 1996 (aged 26)	Free agent
13	FP	Marjona Fayzulloeva		(Tajikistan Football Federation) Zebo Dusti
14	FP	Jonona Qurbonova	18 July 2000 (aged 22)	(Tajikistan Football Federation) Zeboniso WFC

=== Uzbekistan ===
Head coach: Farrukh Zakirov

No.	Pos.	Player	Date of birth (age)	Club
1	GK	Maftuna Jonimqulova	26 July 1999 (aged 23)	(Uzbekistan Football Association)
13	GK	Sevara Nurullaeva		(Uzbekistan Football Association)
2	FP	Nozimakhon Ergasheva	23 January 2001 (aged 22)	(Uzbekistan Football Association)
3	FP	Rushaniya Safina	25 November 1993 (aged 29)	(Uzbekistan Football Association)
4	FP	Feruza Turdiboeva	26 July 1994 (aged 28)	(Uzbekistan Football Association)
5	FP	Shodiya Tosheva	21 February 1999 (aged 23)	(Uzbekistan Football Association)
6	FP	Umida Zoirova	22 April 1998 (aged 24)	(Uzbekistan Football Association)
7	FP	Lyudmila Karachik	8 December 1994 (aged 28)	(Uzbekistan Football Association)
8	FP	Malika Burkhanova	22 February 1999 (aged 23)	(Uzbekistan Football Association)
9	FP	Makhliyo Sarikova	3 March 1990 (aged 32)	(Uzbekistan Football Association)
10	FP	Saida Galimova	27 March 1989 (aged 33)	(Uzbekistan Football Association)
11	FP	Maftuna Shoyimova	1 January 1999 (aged 24)	(Uzbekistan Football Association)
12	FP	Aziza Norboeva	12 December 1996 (aged 26)	(Uzbekistan Football Association)
14	FP	Gulzoda Amirova	13 October 1999 (aged 23)	(Uzbekistan Football Association)
