= Baktygul Toktobolotova =

Kyrgyz footballer (born 2000)

Baktygul Toktobolotova (Kyrgyz: Бактыгүл Токтоболотова; born 5 July 2000) is a Kyrgyzstani football forward, who plays in the Turkish Women's Super League for Dudullu Spor, the Kyrgyzstan women's national football team, and the Kyrgyzstan national futsal team.

== Club career ==
Toktobolotova played in Uzbekistan for WFC Bunyodkor Tashkent in the 2021–22 season.

By October 2022, she moved to Turkey, and signed with the Istanbul-based club Dudullu Spor to play in the 2022–23 Super League. In the second half of the season, she transferred to Ataşehir Belediyespor.

== International career ==
=== Football ===
In 2016, she took part at the 2017 AFC U-19 Women's Championship qualification.

She was part of the Kyrgyzstan national football team, at the CAFA Women's Championship in 2018 and 2022.

=== Futsal ===
She is a member of the Kyrgyzstan women's national futsal team. In 2020, she played at the CAFA U-19 Women's Futsal Championship.

== International goals ==
No.	Date	Venue	Opponent	Score	Result	Competition
1.	27 November 2018	Milliy Stadium, Tashkent, Uzbekistan	Afghanistan	1–0	1–0	2018 CAFA Women's Championship
2.	9 September 2019	Karakol Central Stadium, Karakol, Kyrgyzstan	Tajikistan	1–1	1–2	Friendly
