= Nematjan Zakirov =

Kyrgyz footballer (born 1962)

Personal information
- Full name: Nematjan Zakirov
- Date of birth: 1 January 1962 (age 64)
- Place of birth: Kochkor-Ata, USSR
- Height: 1.83 m (6 ft 0 in)
- Position: Midfielder

Team information
- Current team: Kyrgyzstan Women (head coach)

Senior career*
Years	Team	Apps	(Gls)
1982–1984	Alga Frunze	97	(5)
1985–1986	Alay Osh	63	(4)
1987–1992	Alga Frunze	189	(25)
1992–1994	Pirin Blagoevgrad	37	(3)
1994–1997	Velbazhd Kyustendil	59	(0)
1997–1998	Astana	36	(1)
1999	Zhashtyk-Ak-Altyn	0	(0)
1999	Zhetysu	21	(0)
2000–2001	SKA-PVO Bishkek	28	(4)

International career
1998–2000	Kyrgyzstan	5	(1)

Managerial career
- 2000–2003: SKA-PVO Bishkek
- 2003–2005: Kyrgyzstan
- 2007–2008: FC Abdysh-Ata Kant
- 2007–2008: Kyrgyzstan
- 2011–2012: FC Abdysh-Ata Kant
- 2012: Zhivoye Pivo Kant
- 2013: Alga Bishkek
- 2014–: Xinjiang Tianshan Leopard U-21
- 2019–2021: FC Neftchi Kochkor-Ata
- 2022–: Kyrgyzstan Women
- * Club domestic league appearances and goals

Nematjan Zakirov (Russian: Нематжан Закиров; born 1 January 1962) is a Kyrgyzstani football coach and former footballer, who is currently the head coach of the Kyrgyzstan women's national football team.

== Career ==
=== Club ===
Born in Kochkor-Ata, Zakirov began playing football with local side Alga Frunze in the Soviet leagues. In 1992, he moved to Bulgaria for a spell with Pirin Blagoevgrad in the A PFG. After 1.5 seasons with Pirin, Zakirov joined second division side Velbazhd Kyustendil.

Following his stint in Bulgaria, Zakirov went to Kazakhstan where he played for Astana and Zhetysu. He finished his playing career back in Kyrgyzstan with SKA-PVO Bishkek.

=== International ===
Zakirov made five appearances and scored one goal for Kyrgyzstan national football team from 1999 to 2000.

=== Managerial ===
After he retired from playing, Zakirov became a football coach. He led Kyrgyzstan from 2003 to 2005, and again in 2007.

Zakirov managed Kyrgyzstan League side FC Abdysh-Ata Kant, and its second division farm team FC Zhivoye Pivo before becoming the manager of Alga Bishkek in February 2013. He resigned in February 2014.

== Career statistics ==
=== International ===
Kyrgyzstan national team
Year	Apps	Goals
1999	3	1
2000	2	0
Total	5	1

== Honors ==
=== Club ===
Alga Bishkek/SKA-PVO Bishkek

- Kyrgyzstan League (3); 1992, 2000, 2001
- Kyrgyzstan Cup (3): 1992, 2000, 2001
