= CAFA Women's Championship =

- Founded: 2018; 8 years ago
- Region: CAFA (Central Asia)
- Teams: 5 (2022)
- Current champions: Uzbekistan (2nd title)
- Most championships: Uzbekistan (2 titles)
- Website: Official website
- 2022 CAFA Women's Championship

The CAFA Women's Championship, is an international women's association football competition contested by the senior women's national teams of the members of the Central Asian Football Association (CAFA), the governing body of football in Central Asia.

The official tournament started in 2018, hosted by Uzbekistan and won by Uzbekistan.

== Results ==
Edition	Year	Hosts	Champions	Score	Runners-up	Third place	Score	Fourth place	No. of Teams
1	2018	Uzbekistan	Uzbekistan	round-robin	Iran	Tajikistan	round-robin	Kyrgyzstan	5
2	2022	Tajikistan	Uzbekistan	round-robin	Iran	Kyrgyzstan	round-robin	Turkmenistan	5

== Performance by nation ==
Nation	Titles	Runners-up	Third place	Fourth place	Total
Uzbekistan	2 (2018^{*}, 2022)				2
Iran		2 (2018, 2022)			2
Kyrgyzstan			1 (2022)	1 (2018)	2
Tajikistan			1 (2018)		1
Turkmenistan				1 (2022)	1

* = hosts

== Participating nations ==
Legend

- 1st – Champions
- 2nd – Runners-up
- 3rd – Third place
- 4th – Fourth place
- Q – Qualified for upcoming tournament
- • – Did not qualify
- × – Did not enter / Withdrew / Banned
- – Hosts

Nation	2018 (Uzbekistan) (5)	2022 (Tajikistan) (5)	Total
Afghanistan	5th	×	1
Iran	2nd	2nd	2
Kyrgyzstan	4th	3rd	2
Tajikistan	3rd	5th	2
Turkmenistan	×	4th	1
Uzbekistan	1st	1st	2

== Summary (2018–2022) ==
Teams are ranked by total points, then by goal difference, then by goals scored.

As of 2022 CAFA Women's Championship

Rank	Team	Part	Pld	W	D	L	GF	GA	GD	Pts
1	Uzbekistan	2	8	8	0	0	63	1	+62	24
2	Iran	2	8	6	0	2	26	4	+22	18
3	Tajikistan	2	8	2	1	5	8	28	-20	7
4	Kyrgyzstan	2	8	2	1	5	2	24	-22	7
5	Turkmenistan	1	4	0	2	2	1	11	-10	2
6	Afghanistan	1	4	0	0	4	0	32	-32	0

== Awards ==
=== Winning coaches ===
Year	Team	Coach
2018	Uzbekistan	(Uzbekistan) Bahrom Norsafarov
2022	Uzbekistan	(Japan) Midori Honda

=== Top goalscorers ===
Year	Goalscorers	Goals
2018	(Uzbekistan) Nilufar Kudratova	9
2022	(Uzbekistan) Nilufar Kudratova	5

=== Fair play award ===
Year	Team
2018	Tajikistan
2022	Iran

== See also ==
- CAFA Nations Cup
- ASEAN Women's Championship
- EAFF E-1 W Football Championship
- SAFF Women's Championship
- WAFF Women's Championship
- AFC Women's Asian Cup
