= Diyorakhon Khabibullaeva =

Uzbekistani footballer (born 1999)

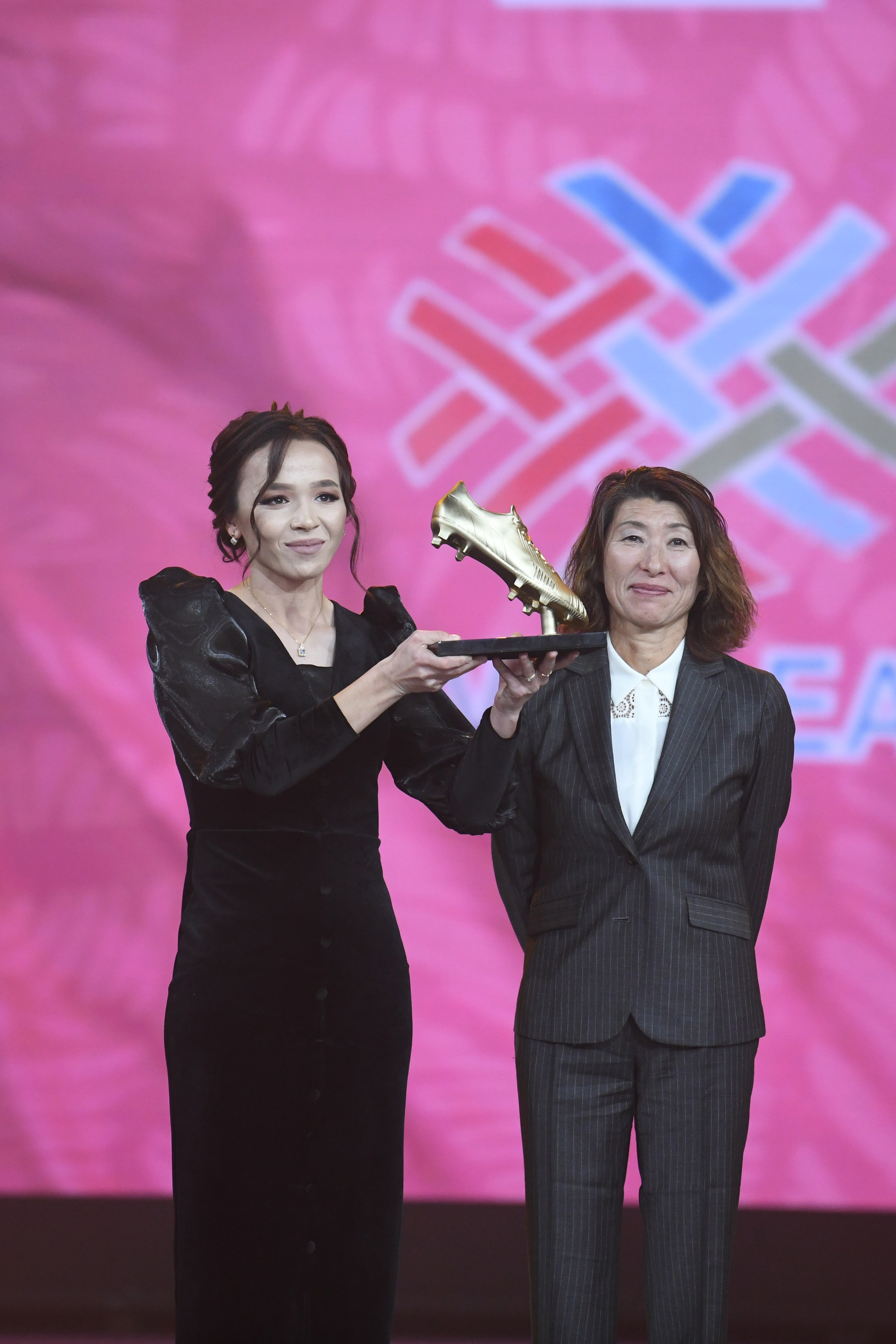
- Diyorakhon Khabibullaeva (left)

Personal information
- Full name: Diyorakhon Polat qizi Khabibullaeva
- Date of birth: 15 September 1999 (age 27)
- Place of birth: Saikhunabad, Uzbekistan
- Position: Forward

Team information
- Current team: Nasaf

Senior career*
Years	Team	Apps	(Gls)
2019-2024	Sogdiana	111	(239)
2024-2025	Trabzonspor	19	(8)
2025	Nasaf		

International career
2017	Uzbekistan U19	3	(2)
2018–	Uzbekistan	38	(44)
- * Club domestic league appearances and goals

Diyorakhon Khabibullaeva (Uzbek: Diyoraxon Habibullayeva; born 15 September 1999) is an Uzbekistani women's football forward who plays in Sevinch of the Women's Championship and the Uzbekistan women's national team.

== Club career ==
In September 2024, Khabibullaeva moved to Turkey, and signed with Trabzonspor to play in the Super League.

== Career statistics ==
=== Club ===
Club	Season	Division	League		Cup		Continental		Total	
Club	Season	Division	Apps	Goals	Apps	Goals	Apps	Goals	Apps	Goals
Sogdiana	2019	Uzbekistan Women's League	22	45					22	45
Sogdiana	2020	Uzbekistan Women's League	15	21	3	4			18	25
Sogdiana	2021	Uzbekistan Women's League	20	34	4	10			24	44
Sogdiana	2022	Uzbekistan Women's League	20	37	1	2			21	39
Sogdiana	2023	Uzbekistan Women's League	21	60					21	60
Sogdiana	2024	Uzbekistan Women's League	13	42	1	1			14	43
Sogdiana	Total		111	239	9	17			120	256
Trabzonspor	2024-25	Turkish Women's Super Lig	19	8					19	8
Nasaf	2025	Uzbekistan Women's League					6	5	6	5
Nasaf	2026	Uzbekistan Women's League					3	5	3	5
Total career			130	247	9	17	9	10	148	274

== International goals ==
No.	Date	Venue	Opponent	Score	Result	Competition
1.	23 November 2018	Milliy Stadium, Tashkent, Uzbekistan	Afghanistan	7–0	20–0	2018 CAFA Women's Championship
2.	23 November 2018	Milliy Stadium, Tashkent, Uzbekistan	Afghanistan	10–0	20–0	2018 CAFA Women's Championship
3.	23 November 2018	Milliy Stadium, Tashkent, Uzbekistan	Afghanistan	11–0	20–0	2018 CAFA Women's Championship
4.	25 November 2018	Milliy Stadium, Tashkent, Uzbekistan	Tajikistan	8–0	11–0	2018 CAFA Women's Championship
5.	25 November 2018	Milliy Stadium, Tashkent, Uzbekistan	Tajikistan	11–0	11–0	2018 CAFA Women's Championship
6.	8 September 2019	Karakol Central Stadium, Karakol, Kyrgyzstan	Tajikistan	9–0	12–0	Friendly
7.	8 September 2019	Karakol Central Stadium, Karakol, Kyrgyzstan	Tajikistan	10–0	12–0	Friendly
8.	17 February 2021	Arslan Zeki Demirci Sports Complex, Ilıca, Turkey	Equatorial Guinea	4–0	5–0	2021 Turkish Women's Cup
9.	11 June 2021	ABFF Stadium, Minsk, Belarus	Iran	4–0	5–0	Friendly
10.	20 September 2021	Pakhtakor Stadium, Tashkent, Uzbekistan	Mongolia	2–0	12–0	2022 AFC Women's Asian Cup qualification
11.	20 September 2021	Pakhtakor Stadium, Tashkent, Uzbekistan	Mongolia	3–0	12–0	2022 AFC Women's Asian Cup qualification
12.	20 September 2021	Pakhtakor Stadium, Tashkent, Uzbekistan	Mongolia	7–0	12–0	2022 AFC Women's Asian Cup qualification
13.	16 February 2022	Gold City Sports Complex, Antalya, Turkey	Lithuania	1–0	1–0	2022 Turkish Women's Cup
14.	17 July 2022	Pamir Stadium, Dushanbe, Tajikistan	Kyrgyzstan	6–0	7–0	2022 CAFA Women's Championship
15.	28 March 2023	Pakhtakor Stadium, Tashkent, Uzbekistan	India	1–0	3–2	Friendly
16.	5 April 2023	Milliy Stadium, Tashkent, Uzbekistan	Bhutan	1–0	9–0	2024 AFC Women's Olympic Qualifying Tournament
17.	5 April 2023	Milliy Stadium, Tashkent, Uzbekistan	Bhutan	2–0	9–0	2024 AFC Women's Olympic Qualifying Tournament
18.	5 April 2023	Milliy Stadium, Tashkent, Uzbekistan	Bhutan	5–0	9–0	2024 AFC Women's Olympic Qualifying Tournament
19.	5 April 2023	Milliy Stadium, Tashkent, Uzbekistan	Bhutan	6–0	9–0	2024 AFC Women's Olympic Qualifying Tournament
20.	5 April 2023	Milliy Stadium, Tashkent, Uzbekistan	Bhutan	8–0	9–0	2024 AFC Women's Olympic Qualifying Tournament
21.	11 April 2023	Milliy Stadium, Tashkent, Uzbekistan	Jordan	3–0	7–0	2024 AFC Women's Olympic Qualifying Tournament
22.	11 April 2023	Milliy Stadium, Tashkent, Uzbekistan	Jordan	4–0	7–0	2024 AFC Women's Olympic Qualifying Tournament
23.	11 April 2023	Milliy Stadium, Tashkent, Uzbekistan	Jordan	7–0	7–0	2024 AFC Women's Olympic Qualifying Tournament
24.	25 September 2023	Linping Sports Center Stadium, Hangzhou, China	Mongolia	4–0	6–0	2022 Asian Games
25.	25 September 2023	Linping Sports Center Stadium, Hangzhou, China	Mongolia	6–0	6–0	2022 Asian Games
26.	30 September 2023	Linping Sports Center Stadium, Hangzhou, China	Chinese Taipei	1–0	2–1 (a.e.t.)	2022 Asian Games
27.	26 October 2023	Milliy Stadium, Tashkent, Uzbekistan	Vietnam	1–0	1–0	2024 AFC Women's Olympic Qualifying Tournament
28.	31 May 2024	Milliy Stadium, Tashkent, Uzbekistan	India	1–0	3–0	Friendly
29.	31 May 2024	Milliy Stadium, Tashkent, Uzbekistan	India	2–0	3–0	Friendly
30.	31 May 2024	Milliy Stadium, Tashkent, Uzbekistan	India	3–0	3–0	Friendly
31.	8 April 2025	Yongchuan Sports Center, Chongqing, China	Zambia	2–4	3–4	2025 Yongchuan International Tournament
32.	8 April 2025	Yongchuan Sports Center, Chongqing, China	Zambia	3–4	3–4	2025 Yongchuan International Tournament
33.	30 May 2025	Padukone-Dravid Centre for Sports Excellence, Bengaluru, India	India	1–0	1–0	Friendly
34.	24 June 2025	Do'stlik Stadion, Tashkent, Uzbekistan	Palestine	2–0	4–0	Friendly
35.	29 June 2025	Milliy Stadium, Tashkent, Uzbekistan	Sri Lanka	5–0	10–0	2026 AFC Women's Asian Cup qualification
36.	29 June 2025	Milliy Stadium, Tashkent, Uzbekistan	Sri Lanka	9–0	10–0	2026 AFC Women's Asian Cup qualification
37.	29 June 2025	Milliy Stadium, Tashkent, Uzbekistan	Sri Lanka	10–0	10–0	2026 AFC Women's Asian Cup qualification
38.	2 July 2025	Milliy Stadium, Tashkent, Uzbekistan	Laos	1–0	7–0	2026 AFC Women's Asian Cup qualification
39.	5 July 2025	Milliy Stadium, Tashkent, Uzbekistan	Nepal	1–0	3–3 (4–2 p)	2026 AFC Women's Asian Cup qualification
40.	29 October 2025	Rizal Memorial Stadium, Manila, Philippines	Philippines	1–2	2–2	Friendly
41.	29 October 2025	Rizal Memorial Stadium, Manila, Philippines	Philippines	2–2	2–2	Friendly
42.	29 November 2025	Milliy Stadium, Tashkent, Uzbekistan	Iran	2–0	2–0	Friendly
43.	2 December 2025	Milliy Stadium, Tashkent, Uzbekistan	Iran	1–0	1–0	Friendly
44.	9 March 2026	Perth Rectangular Stadium, Perth, Australia	Bangladesh	1–0	4–0	2026 AFC Women's Asian Cup
45.	21 September 2026	Wave Stadium Kariya, Kariya, Japan	Hong Kong	1–0	2–1	2026 Asian Games
46.	25 September 2026	Nagai Stadium, Osaka, Japan	South Korea	1–1	3–6	2026 Asian Games
47.	9 October 2026	Moulay El Hassan Stadium, Rabat, Morocco	Morocco	1–0	1–3	Friendly

== See also ==
- List of Uzbekistan women's international footballers
