= Nilufar Kudratova =

Uzbekistani footballer (born 1997)

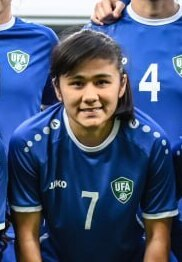
- Kudratova with Uzbekistan in 2023

Personal information
- Full name: Nilufar Gulmurod qizi Kudratova
- Date of birth: 5 June 1997 (age 29)
- Place of birth: Qarshi, Uzbekistan
- Position: Forward

Team information
- Current team: Sevinch

Senior career*
Years	Team	Apps	(Gls)
- Sevinch

International career^{‡}
2012	Uzbekistan U16	5	(3)
2014	Uzbekistan U19	5	(7)
2015–	Uzbekistan	38	(36)
- * Club domestic league appearances and goals ‡ National team caps and goals as of 26 October 2023

Nilufar Kudratova (Uzbek: Nilufar Qudratova; born 5 June 1997) is an Uzbekistani footballer who plays as a forward for Women's Championship club Sevinch and the Uzbekistan women's national team.

== International goals ==
No.	Date	Venue	Opponent	Score	Result	Competition
1.	11 March 2015	Petra Stadium, Amman, Jordan	Palestine	6–0	6–0	2016 AFC Women's Olympic Qualifying Tournament
2.	23 November 2018	Milliy Stadium, Tashkent, Uzbekistan	Afghanistan	2–0	20–0	2018 CAFA Women's Championship
3.	23 November 2018	Milliy Stadium, Tashkent, Uzbekistan	Afghanistan	3–0	20–0	2018 CAFA Women's Championship
4.	23 November 2018	Milliy Stadium, Tashkent, Uzbekistan	Afghanistan	16–0	20–0	2018 CAFA Women's Championship
5.	23 November 2018	Milliy Stadium, Tashkent, Uzbekistan	Afghanistan	17–0	20–0	2018 CAFA Women's Championship
6.	25 November 2018	Milliy Stadium, Tashkent, Uzbekistan	Tajikistan	3–0	11–0	2018 CAFA Women's Championship
7.	25 November 2018	Milliy Stadium, Tashkent, Uzbekistan	Tajikistan	7–0	11–0	2018 CAFA Women's Championship
8.	25 November 2018	Milliy Stadium, Tashkent, Uzbekistan	Tajikistan	9–0	11–0	2018 CAFA Women's Championship
9.	25 November 2018	Milliy Stadium, Tashkent, Uzbekistan	Tajikistan	10–0	11–0	2018 CAFA Women's Championship
10.	29 November 2018	Milliy Stadium, Tashkent, Uzbekistan	Kyrgyzstan	6–0	10–0	2018 CAFA Women's Championship
11.	3 March 2019	Evrenseki Stadium, Side, Turkey	Turkmenistan	3–0	11–1	2019 Turkish Women's Cup
12.	3 March 2019	Evrenseki Stadium, Side, Turkey	Turkmenistan	4–0	11–1	2019 Turkish Women's Cup
13.	3 March 2019	Evrenseki Stadium, Side, Turkey	Turkmenistan	5–0	11–1	2019 Turkish Women's Cup
14.	6 April 2019	Lokomotiv Stadium, Tashkent, Uzbekistan	Jordan	1–0	2–0	2020 AFC Women's Olympic Qualifying Tournament
15.	6 April 2019	Lokomotiv Stadium, Tashkent, Uzbekistan	Jordan	2–0	2–0	2020 AFC Women's Olympic Qualifying Tournament
16.	29 August 2019	Yakkasary Stadium, Tashkent, Uzbekistan	India	3–1	5–1	Friendly
17.	8 September 2019	Karakol Central Stadium, Karakol, Kyrgyzstan	Tajikistan	3–0	12–0	Friendly
18.	17 February 2021	Arslan Zeki Demirci Sports Complex, Ilıca, Turkey	Equatorial Guinea	1–0	5–0	2021 Turkish Women's Cup
19.	17 February 2021	Arslan Zeki Demirci Sports Complex, Ilıca, Turkey	Equatorial Guinea	2–0	5–0	2021 Turkish Women's Cup
20.	11 April 2021	AGMK Stadium, Olmaliq, Uzbekistan	Belarus	1–0	1–3	Friendly
21.	20 September 2021	Pakhtakor Stadium, Tashkent, Uzbekistan	Mongolia	4–0	12–0	2022 AFC Women's Asian Cup qualification
22.	20 September 2021	Pakhtakor Stadium, Tashkent, Uzbekistan	Mongolia	8–0	12–0	2022 AFC Women's Asian Cup qualification
23.	11 July 2022	Pamir Stadium, Dushanbe, Tajikistan	Tajikistan	2–0	6–0	2022 CAFA Women's Championship
24.	11 July 2022	Pamir Stadium, Dushanbe, Tajikistan	Tajikistan	4–0	6–0	2022 CAFA Women's Championship
25.	11 July 2022	Pamir Stadium, Dushanbe, Tajikistan	Tajikistan	5–0	6–0	2022 CAFA Women's Championship
26.	17 July 2022	Pamir Stadium, Dushanbe, Tajikistan	Kyrgyzstan	1–0	7–0	2022 CAFA Women's Championship
27.	17 July 2022	Pamir Stadium, Dushanbe, Tajikistan	Kyrgyzstan	3–0	7–0	2022 CAFA Women's Championship
28.	11 April 2023	Milliy Stadium, Tashkent, Uzbekistan	Jordan	5–0	7–0	2024 AFC Women's Olympic Qualifying Tournament
29.	11 April 2023	Milliy Stadium, Tashkent, Uzbekistan	Jordan	6–0	7–0	2024 AFC Women's Olympic Qualifying Tournament
30.	25 September 2023	Linping Sports Center Stadium, Hangzhou, China	Mongolia	5–0	6–0	2022 Asian Games
31.	1 November 2023	Milliy Stadium, Tashkent, Uzbekistan	India	1–0	3–0	2024 AFC Women's Olympic Qualifying Tournament
32.	3 June 2025	Padukone-Dravid Centre for Sports Excellence, Bengaluru, India	India	1–0	1–0	Friendly
33.	29 June 2025	Milliy Stadium, Tashkent, Uzbekistan	Sri Lanka	1–0	10–0	2026 AFC Women's Asian Cup qualification
34.	29 June 2025	Milliy Stadium, Tashkent, Uzbekistan	Sri Lanka	2–0	10–0	2026 AFC Women's Asian Cup qualification
35.	29 June 2025	Milliy Stadium, Tashkent, Uzbekistan	Sri Lanka	6–0	10–0	2026 AFC Women's Asian Cup qualification
36.	29 June 2025	Milliy Stadium, Tashkent, Uzbekistan	Sri Lanka	8–0	10–0	2026 AFC Women's Asian Cup qualification
37.	2 July 2025	Milliy Stadium, Tashkent, Uzbekistan	Laos	3–0	7–0	2026 AFC Women's Asian Cup qualification
38.	2 July 2025	Milliy Stadium, Tashkent, Uzbekistan	Laos	7–0	7–0	2026 AFC Women's Asian Cup qualification
39.	9 March 2026	Perth Rectangular Stadium, Perth, Australia	Bangladesh	4–0	4–0	2026 AFC Women's Asian Cup
40.	3 June 2026	Thuwunna Stadium, Yangon, Myanmar	Myanmar	1–0	1–0	2026 AYA Bank Tri-Nations Cup
41.	25 September 2026	Nagai Stadium, Osaka, Japan	South Korea	3–4	3–6	2026 Asian Games

== See also ==
- List of Uzbekistan women's international footballers
