= Lyudmila Karachik =

Uzbekistani footballer (born 1994)

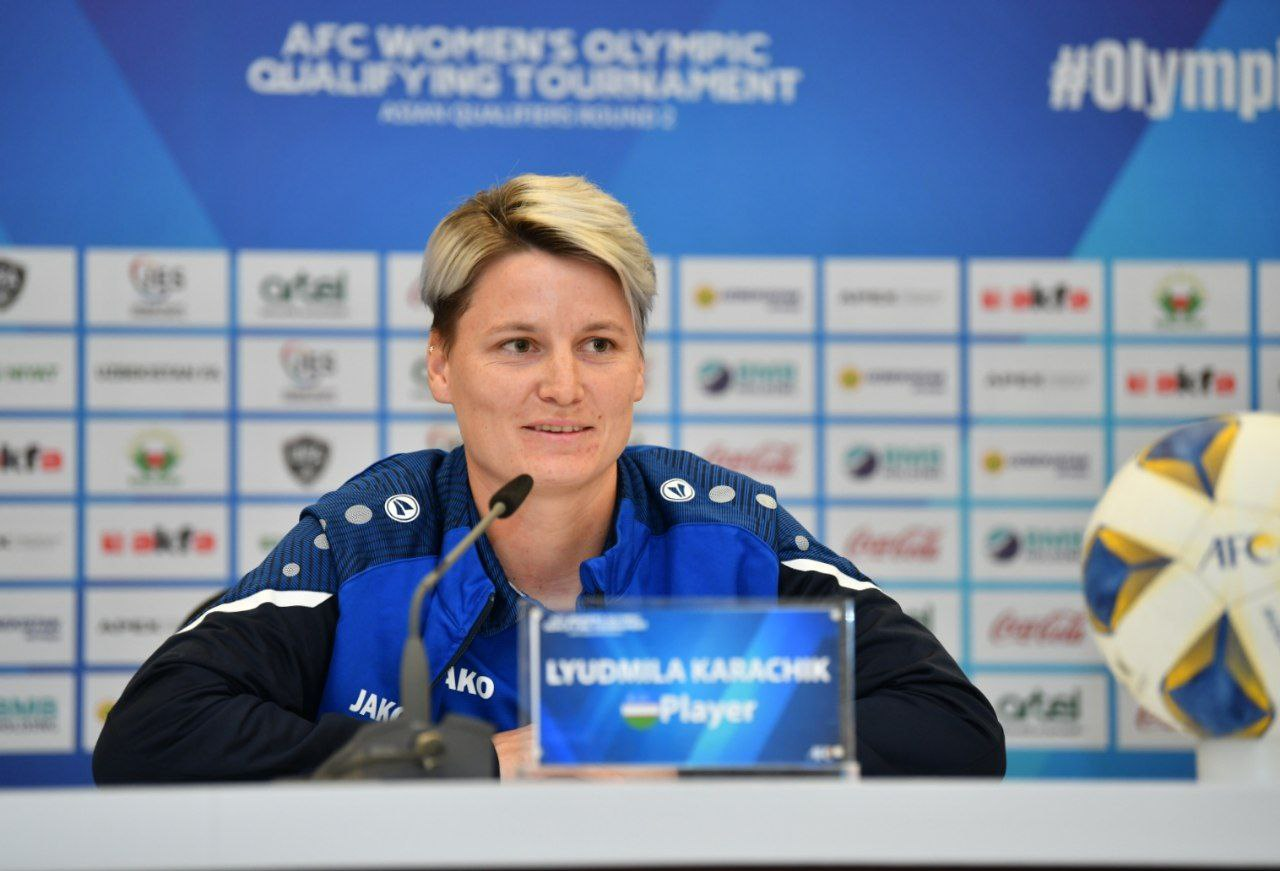
- Karachik in 2023

Personal information
- Full name: Lyudmila Sergeyevna Karachik
- Date of birth: 8 December 1994 (age 31)
- Place of birth: Tashkent, Uzbekistan
- Position: Forward

Team information
- Current team: Nasaf

Senior career*
Years	Team	Apps	(Gls)
2015-2018	Metallurg	62	(133)
2019–2023	Bunyodkor	97	(151)
2024	Nasaf	22	(48)

International career^{‡}
2010	Uzbekistan U19	5	(2)
2011–	Uzbekistan	30	(38)
- * Club domestic league appearances and goals ‡ National team caps and goals as of 29 November 2025

Lyudmila Karachik (born 8 December 1994) is an Uzbekistani footballer who plays as a forward for Women's Championship club Sevinch and the Uzbekistan women's national team.

== Career statistics ==
=== Club ===
Club	Season	Division	League		Cup		Continental		Total	
Club	Season	Division	Apps	Goals	Apps	Goals	Apps	Goals	Apps	Goals
Metallurg	2015	Uzbekistan Women's League	22	66	1	1			23	67
Metallurg	2016	Uzbekistan Women's League	20	27					20	17
Metallurg	2017	Uzbekistan Women's League	20	40					20	40
Metallurg	Total		62	133	1	1			63	134
Budyodkor	2019	Uzbekistan Women's League	22	42	1	1			23	43
Budyodkor	2020	Uzbekistan Women's League	16	26	4	5			20	31
Budyodkor	2021	Uzbekistan Women's League	21	27	3	1			24	28
Budyodkor	2022	Uzbekistan Women's League	17	19	4	2			21	21
Budyodkor	2023	Uzbekistan Women's League	21	37			1	1	22	38
Budyodkor	Total		97	151	12	9	1	1	110	161
Nasaf	2024	Uzbekistan Women's League	22	48	1	1			23	49
Nasaf	2025	Uzbekistan Women's League					6	2	6	2
Nasaf	2026	Uzbekistan Women's League					5	5	5	5
Nasaf	Total		22	48	1	1	11	7	34	56
Total career			181	332	14	11	12	8	207	351

== International goals ==
No.	Date	Venue	Opponent	Score	Result	Competition
1.	20 March 2011	Bangabandhu National Stadium, Dhaka, Bangladesh	Bangladesh	3–0	3–0	2012 Summer Olympics qualification
2.	23 March 2011	Bangabandhu National Stadium, Dhaka, Bangladesh	India	3–1	5–1	2012 Summer Olympics qualification
3.	3 April 2017	Kim Il-sung Stadium, Pyongyang, North Korea	Hong Kong	1–0	2–1	2018 AFC Women's Asian Cup qualification
4.	7 April 2017	Kim Il-sung Stadium, Pyongyang, North Korea	India	1–0	7–1	2018 AFC Women's Asian Cup qualification
5.	7 April 2017	Kim Il-sung Stadium, Pyongyang, North Korea	India	2–0	7–1	2018 AFC Women's Asian Cup qualification
6.	23 November 2018	Milliy Stadium, Tashkent, Uzbekistan	Afghanistan	1–0	20–0	2018 CAFA Women's Championship
7.	23 November 2018	Milliy Stadium, Tashkent, Uzbekistan	Afghanistan	4–0	20–0	2018 CAFA Women's Championship
8.	23 November 2018	Milliy Stadium, Tashkent, Uzbekistan	Afghanistan	5–0	20–0	2018 CAFA Women's Championship
9.	25 November 2018	Milliy Stadium, Tashkent, Uzbekistan	Tajikistan	1–0	11–0	2018 CAFA Women's Championship
10.	25 November 2018	Milliy Stadium, Tashkent, Uzbekistan	Tajikistan	2–0	11–0	2018 CAFA Women's Championship
11.	25 November 2018	Milliy Stadium, Tashkent, Uzbekistan	Tajikistan	4–0	11–0	2018 CAFA Women's Championship
12.	25 November 2018	Milliy Stadium, Tashkent, Uzbekistan	Tajikistan	6–0	11–0	2018 CAFA Women's Championship
13.	29 November 2018	Milliy Stadium, Tashkent, Uzbekistan	Kyrgyzstan	3–0	10–0	2018 CAFA Women's Championship
14.	29 November 2018	Milliy Stadium, Tashkent, Uzbekistan	Kyrgyzstan	4–0	10–0	2018 CAFA Women's Championship
15.	9 April 2019	Lokomotiv Stadium, Tashkent, Uzbekistan	Hong Kong	3–0	5–1	2020 AFC Women's Olympic Qualifying Tournament
16.	9 April 2019	Lokomotiv Stadium, Tashkent, Uzbekistan	Hong Kong	5–1	5–1	2020 AFC Women's Olympic Qualifying Tournament
17.	29 August 2019	Yakkasary Stadium, Tashkent, Uzbekistan	India	1–1	5–1	Friendly
18.	2 September 2019	Yakkasary Stadium, Tashkent, Uzbekistan	India	1–1	1–1	Friendly
19.	8 September 2019	Karakol Central Stadium, Karakol, Kyrgyzstan	Tajikistan	2–0	12–0	Friendly
20.	8 September 2019	Karakol Central Stadium, Karakol, Kyrgyzstan	Tajikistan	4–0	12–0	Friendly
21.	8 September 2019	Karakol Central Stadium, Karakol, Kyrgyzstan	Tajikistan	6–0	12–0	Friendly
22.	11 June 2021	ABFF Stadium, Minsk, Belarus	Iran	1–0	5–0	Friendly
23.	11 June 2021	ABFF Stadium, Minsk, Belarus	Iran	2–0	5–0	Friendly
24.	14 June 2021	Vitebsky Central Sport Complex, Vitebsk, Belarus	Belarus	1–1	1–1	Friendly
25.	23 August 2021	Milliy Stadium, Tashkent, Uzbekistan	Iran	1–0	2–0	Friendly
26.	26 August 2021	Milliy Stadium, Tashkent, Uzbekistan	Iran	1–0	1–1	Friendly
27.	20 September 2021	Pakhtakor Stadium, Tashkent, Uzbekistan	Mongolia	1–0	12–0	2022 AFC Women's Asian Cup qualification
28.	15 February 2023	Miracle Sports Complex, Antalya, Turkey	Slovenia	1–2	1–2	2023 Turkish Women's Cup
29.	28 March 2023	Pakhtakor Stadium, Tashkent, Uzbekistan	India	2–1	3–2	Friendly
30.	5 April 2023	Milliy Stadium, Tashkent, Uzbekistan	Bhutan	3–0	9–0	2024 AFC Women's Olympic Qualifying Tournament
31.	5 April 2023	Milliy Stadium, Tashkent, Uzbekistan	Bhutan	4–0	9–0	2024 AFC Women's Olympic Qualifying Tournament
32.	17 July 2023	Borisov Arena, Barysaw, Belarus	Belarus	1–0	2–1	Friendly
33.	17 July 2023	Borisov Arena, Barysaw, Belarus	Belarus	2–0	2–1	Friendly
34.	1 November 2023	Milliy Stadium, Tashkent, Uzbekistan	India	2–0	3–0	2024 AFC Women's Olympic Qualifying Tournament
35.	1 November 2023	Milliy Stadium, Tashkent, Uzbekistan	India	3–0	3–0	2024 AFC Women's Olympic Qualifying Tournament
36.	24 June 2025	Do'stlik Stadion, Tashkent, Uzbekistan	Palestine	3–0	4–0	Friendly
37.	29 June 2025	Milliy Stadium, Tashkent, Uzbekistan	Sri Lanka	3–0	10–0	2026 AFC Women's Asian Cup qualification
38.	29 June 2025	Milliy Stadium, Tashkent, Uzbekistan	Sri Lanka	4–0	10–0	2026 AFC Women's Asian Cup qualification
39.	5 July 2025	Milliy Stadium, Tashkent, Uzbekistan	Nepal	2–0	3–3 (4–2 p)	2026 AFC Women's Asian Cup qualification
40.	29 November 2025	Milliy Stadium, Tashkent, Uzbekistan	Iran	1–0	2–0	Friendly

== See also ==
- List of Uzbekistan women's international footballers
