= Madina Fozilova =

Tajikistani footballer

Personal information
- Full name: Madina Fozilova
- Date of birth: 1 May 1996 (age 30)
- Position: Forward

International career^{‡}
Years	Team	Apps	(Gls)
2012	Tajikistan	17	(9)
- ‡ National team caps and goals as of 13 November 2018

Madina Fozilova (born 1 May 1996) is a Tajikistani footballer who plays as a forward. She has been a member of the Tajikistan women's national team.

== International goals ==
No.	Date	Venue	Opponent	Score	Result	Competition
1.	4 November 2018	Hisor Central Stadium, Hisor, Tajikistan	Mongolia	3–1	4–1	2020 AFC Women's Olympic Qualifying Tournament
2.	4 November 2018	Hisor Central Stadium, Hisor, Tajikistan	Mongolia	4–1	4–1	2020 AFC Women's Olympic Qualifying Tournament
3.	13 November 2018	Hisor Central Stadium, Hisor, Tajikistan	Singapore	5–0	6–0	2020 AFC Women's Olympic Qualifying Tournament
4.	23 November 2018	Milliy Stadium, Tashkent, Uzbekistan	Kyrgyzstan	1–0	1–0	2018 CAFA Women's Championship
5.	1 December 2018	Milliy Stadium, Tashkent, Uzbekistan	Afghanistan	1–0	5–0	2018 CAFA Women's Championship
6.	1 December 2018	Milliy Stadium, Tashkent, Uzbekistan	Afghanistan	3–0	5–0	2018 CAFA Women's Championship
