= 2018 CAFA Women's Championship =

Tournament details
- Host country: Uzbekistan
- City: Tashkent
- Dates: 23 November – 1 December 2018
- Teams: 5 (from 1 sub-confederation)
- Venue: 1 (in 1 host city)

Final positions
- Champions: Uzbekistan (1st title)
- Runners-up: Iran
- Third place: Tajikistan
- Fourth place: Kyrgyzstan

Tournament statistics
- Matches played: 10
- Goals scored: 67 (6.7 per match)
- Top scorer(s): (Uzbekistan) Nilufar Kudratova (9 goals)
- Best player: (Uzbekistan) Lyudmila Karachik
- Fair play award: Tajikistan
- All statistics correct as of 3 July 2022.

The 2018 CAFA Women's Championship is the first edition of the CAFA Women's Championship, an association football tournament for women's national teams from the Central Asian Football Association. Hosted by Tashkent, Uzbekistan, it took place 23 November–1 December 2018.

Uzbekistan won the title undefeated.

== Teams ==
All CAFA members but Turkmenistan entered. Afghanistan appeared with a B-team of sorts after several players and the captain refused to sign a contract pre-tournament.

== League table ==
Match order drawn on 22 November.

Pos	Team	Pld	W	D	L	GF	GA	GD	Pts
1	Uzbekistan (C, H)	4	4	0	0	43	1	+42	12
2	Iran	4	3	0	1	16	3	+13	9
3	Tajikistan	4	2	0	2	7	15	−8	6
4	Kyrgyzstan	4	1	0	3	1	16	−15	3
5	Afghanistan	4	0	0	4	0	32	−32	0

Updated to match(es) played on 1 December. Source: Flashscore
Rules for classification: 1) Points; 2) Goal difference; 3) Number of goals scored;
(C) Champions; (H) Hosts

== Fixtures ==
23 November 2018
13:00 UTC+05:00

Tajikistan	1–0	Kyrgyzstan
Fozilova 90+5'	Report

Milliy Stadium, Tashkent
23 November 2018
16:00 UTC+05:00

Uzbekistan	20–0	Afghanistan
Karachik 4', 19', 22'; Kudratova 5', 15', 68', 75'; Turdiboeva 31'; Khabibullaeva 36', 47', 49'; Burkhonova 37'; Safina 39'; Shoyimova 49'; Zoirova 51'; Nozimova 59', 76', 82', 88'; Jonimqulova 64' (pen.)	Report

Milliy Stadium, Tashkent

25 November 2018
13:00 UTC+05:00

Afghanistan	0–6	Iran
	Report	Ghanbari 4', 21'; Shaban 9', 39'; Mahdumi 34'; Geraeli 49'

Milliy Stadium, Tashkent
25 November 2018
16:00 UTC+05:00

Uzbekistan	11–0	Tajikistan
Karachik 11', 13', 25', 54'; Kudratova 23', 71', 86', 90'; Turdiboeva 48'; Khabibullaeva 72', 90+3'	Report

Milliy Stadium, Tashkent

27 November 2018
13:00 UTC+05:00

Iran	1–2	Uzbekistan
Zahro Ganja 29' (pen.)	Report	Turdiboeva 40' (pen.); Kuchkarova 43'

Milliy Stadium, Tashkent
27 November 2018
16:00 UTC+05:00

Kyrgyzstan	1–0	Afghanistan
Toktobolotova 19' (pen.)	Report

Milliy Stadium, Tashkent

29 November 2018
13:00 UTC+05:00

Kyrgyzstan	0–10	Uzbekistan
	Report	Turdiboeva 3'; Shoyimova 6'; Karachik 12', 20'; Kurbonova 42', 64'; Kudratova 49'; Amirova 52'; Erkinova 76'; Nozimova 87'

Milliy Stadium, Tashkent
29 November 2018
16:00 UTC+05:00

Tajikistan	1–4	Iran
Kholnazzarova 2'	Report	Ghasemi 10', 70'; Chahkandi 51'; Motevalli 87'

Milliy Stadium, Tashkent

1 December 2018
13:00 UTC+05:00

Afghanistan	0–5	Tajikistan
		Fozilova 17', 59'; Jumakhon 45', 84'; Khamilova 69'

Milliy Stadium, Tashkent
Attendance: 100
1 December 2018
16:00 UTC+05:00

Iran	5–0	Kyrgyzstan
Khodabakhshi 29', 45'; Ghanbari 69'; Dorofeeva 78' (o.g.); Ghasemi 86'	Report

Milliy Stadium, Tashkent
Attendance: 150
Referee: Khusnora Jumaeva (Uzbekistan)

== Awards ==
- Topscorer: Nilufar Kudratova (Uzbekistan)
- Fair Play: Tajikistan
- Most Valuable Player: Lyudmila Karachik (Uzbekistan)
