= Laylo Khalimova =

Tajik football player

Personal information
- Date of birth: 16 November 1997 (age 28)
- Place of birth: Tajikistan
- Height: 1.60 m (5 ft 3 in)
- Position: Forward

Team information
- Current team: Khatlon

Senior career*
| Years | Team | Apps | (Gls) |
| 2018– | Khatlon | +75 | (+257) |

International career
| 2013 | Tajikistan U19 | 3 | (1) |
| 2017– | Tajikistan | 26 | (4) |
Medal record
Representing Tajikistan
| Third place | 2018 Uzbekistan |
- * Club domestic league appearances and goals as of 23 January 2023

Laylo Khalimova (Russian: Лайло Халимова; born 16 November 1997) is a Tajik football and futsal player who plays as a forward for Tajik club Khatlon in the Tajik women's league and the Tajikistan women's national football team.

Khalimova is Tajikistan women's league all-time top scorer with more of 257 goals.

== Club career ==
=== Khatlon ===
Khalimova played the inaugural Tajik women's football league with Khalton FC, where she scored 16 goals in 10 match appearances. Although her team finished as runners-up, Laylo was named the top soccer of the 2018 edition. in the 2019's season Khalimova helped her team earn gold medals for the first time beating Zeboniso. in which she finished as the top scorer. in 2020 Laylo received its three in row golden boot after scoring 78 goals in 18 matches. 2021 saw Khalton's striker Khalimova voted the Tajik women's player of the year. after her team won the league for the second time in its History, Khalimova scored 67 goals in 18 matches. and yet earning her fourth in-row golden boot. Khalimova widen the gap between her and her fellow mates after winning her fifth golden boot in 2022 after she scored 68 goals in that season.

== Career statistics ==
As of 28 July 2024

| Club | Season | League | | |
| Club | Season | Division | Apps | Goals |
|---|---|---|---|---|
| Khatlon | 2018 | Tajik Women's League | 10 | 16 |
| Khatlon | 2019 | Tajik Women's League | | |
| Khatlon | 2020 | Tajik Women's League | 18 | 78 |
| Khatlon | 2021 | Tajik Women's League | 18 | 67 |
| Khatlon | 2022 | Tajik Women's League | 18 | 68 |
| Khatlon | 2023 | Tajik Women's League | | 16 |
| Khatlon | 2024 | Tajik Women's League | 11 | 12 |
| Total career | | | +75 | +257 |

== International goals ==
| No. | Date | Venue | Opponent | Score | Result | Competition |
|---|---|---|---|---|---|---|
| 1. | 4 November 2018 | Hisor Central Stadium, Hisor, Tajikistan | Mongolia | 1–0 | 4–1 | 2020 AFC Women's Olympic Qualifying Tournament |
| 2. | 1 December 2018 | Milliy Stadium, Tashkent, Uzbekistan | Afghanistan | 4–0 | 5–0 | 2018 CAFA Women's Championship |
| 3. | 26 September 2021 | Republican Central Stadium, Dushanbe, Tajikistan | Maldives | 1–0 | 4–0 | 2022 AFC Women's Asian Cup qualification |
| 4. | 26 September 2021 | Republican Central Stadium, Dushanbe, Tajikistan | Maldives | 3–0 | 4–0 | 2022 AFC Women's Asian Cup qualification |

== Honours ==
=== Tajikistan ===
- 2018 CAFA Women's Championship:

Third place: 2018

=== FC Khalton ===
- Tajikistan women's Higher League:

Champions: 2021, 2019
Runners-up: 2018, 2020, 2022

=== Individual ===
- FFT Tajik Women's Footballer of the Year: 2021
- Tajikistan women's Higher League Top Scorer: 2018, 2020, 2021, 2022
