= Saida Galimova =

Uzbekistani footballer

Personal information
- Full name: Saida Shavkatovna Galimova
- Date of birth: 27 March 1989 (age 37)
- Place of birth: Andijan, Soviet Union (now Uzbekistan)
- Position: Midfielder

Team information
- Current team: Bunyodkor

Senior career*
Years	Team	Apps	(Gls)
- Bunyodkor

International career^{‡}
2019–	Uzbekistan	3	(0)
2015	Uzbekistan (futsal)	1+	(0)
- * Club domestic league appearances and goals ‡ National team caps and goals as of 9 April 2019

Saida Galimova (born 27 March 1989) is an Uzbekistani footballer who plays as a midfielder for Women's Championship club Bunyodkor and the Uzbekistan women's national team.

== International career ==
Galimova capped for Uzbekistan at senior level during the 2020 AFC Women's Olympic Qualifying Tournament.

== International goals ==
No.	Date	Venue	Opponent	Score	Result	Competition
1.	20 September 2021	Pakhtakor Stadium, Tashkent, Uzbekistan	Mongolia	10–0	12–0	2022 AFC Women's Asian Cup qualification

== See also ==
- List of Uzbekistan women's international footballers
