= Tajikistan women's national football team =

Women's national association football team representing Tajikistan

Tajikistan
- Association: Tajikistan Football Federation (FFT)
- Confederation: AFC (Asia)
- Sub-confederation: CAFA (Central Asia)
- Head coach: Mubin Ergashev
- Captain: Saiyora Saidova
- Most caps: Laylo Khalimova (26)
- Top scorer: Gulsunbi Khalimova (7)
- Home stadium: Pamir Stadium
- FIFA code: TJK
First colours	Second colours

FIFA ranking
- Current: 159 ▼1 (16 June 2026)
- Highest: 99 (December 2017)
- Lowest: 158 (August – December 2025)

First international
- Kyrgyzstan 1–1 Tajikistan (Almaty, Kazakhstan; 28 February 2017)

Biggest win
- Tajikistan 6–0 Singapore (Hisor, Tajikistan; 13 November 2018)

Biggest defeat
- Tajikistan 0–16 North Korea (Palembang, Indonesia; 17 August 2018); Tajikistan 0–16 China (Palembang, Indonesia; 20 August 2018)

CAFA Championship
- Appearances: 2 (first in 2018)
- Best result: Third Place (2018)
Medal record
CAFA Women's Championship
Bronze medal – third place	2018 CAFA Women's Championship	Team

The Tajikistan women's national football team (Note: Tajik: Дастаи мунтахаби занонаи футболи Тоҷикистон, romanized: Dastai muntakhabi zanonai futboli Tojikiston) represents Tajikistan in women's association football. The team is governed by the Tajikistan Football Federation (FFT) and competes in AFC (Asian Football Confederation) and CAFA (Central Asian Football Association) women's competitions. The team is currently ranked 158th in the world by FIFA.

== History ==
=== The international debut ===
Tajikistan women's football was established in 2013, but it wasn't until 2017 that the women's team had their first international match against the neighboring Kyrgyzstan as a preparation for their 2018 AFC Women's Asian Cup qualification campaign, entering the qualification for the first time Tajikistan hosted the tournament in Dushanbe with the participation of the host of the 2018 AFC Women's Asian Cup Jordan and other five teams including Bahrain, UAE, Iraq, and the Philippines. the Tajiks won their first-ever competitive match against Iraq. eventually Tajikistan ended fifth after losing the following games against the other four teams.

in 2018 Tajikistan was the first Central Asian team to participate in the women's football tournament of Asian Games. they were drawn into a group of East Asian teams with AFC powerhouse North Korea and China PR being in the same group. In that tournament, the Tajik registered their biggest loss (16–0) to both North Korea and China PR. later that year the Tajik team made their first appearance in the AFC Women's Olympic Qualifying Group for the 2020 Olympic Games. Tajikistan which shows interest in hosting international women's Asian tournaments hosted Group A of the first round of the qualifiers in Hisor's Central Stadium. Tajikistan won their first match against Mongolia four to nil starting the qualifiers with a win that boosted Tajik's hope of advancing to the second round. in their second match with Chinese Taipei, the team lost nine goals to nil. however, the match against the Philippines was the decider. eventually, Tajikistan who scored the opening goal lost after the Philippines came back with three goals to finish at top of Tajikistan. the team finished their qualifying campaign up high with a six-nil win over Singapore, yet their biggest win on the international stage. 2018 was the year for the Tajik women's team as they played 11 matches and to conclude this year the team participate in the inaugural edition of CAFA Women's Championship hosted by Uzbekistan. four central Asian teams alongside Tajikistan participated in the first edition. Tajikistan managed to get two wins in their opening and last game against Kyrgyzstan and Afghanistan respectively. which led them to finish third place.

== Team image ==
=== Nicknames ===
The team doesn't have a nickname officially.

=== Home stadium ===
Tajikistan plays the majority of their home matches on the Republican Central Stadium, The national team also held official international matches at the Hisor Central stadium.

Tajikistan women's national football team home stadiums
Image	Stadium	Capacity	Location	Last match
	Republican Central Stadium	20,000	Dushanbe	v Kyrgyzstan (July 20, 2022; 2022 CAFA Women's Championship)
	Hisor Central Stadium	20,000	Hisor	v Singapore (September 19, 2021; Friendly)

=== Kit suppliers ===
Kit supplier	Period	Notes
(China) Li-Ning	2017–2022	
(Italy) Macron	2022–present	

== FIFA World Ranking ==
As of 9 December 2022

Tajikistan's FIFA World Ranking History
Year's	2017	2018	2019	2020	2021	2022
FIFA World Ranking	99	124	128	121	138	144
AFC Ranking	23	23	26	18	27	31

== Results and fixtures ==
The following is a list of match results in the last 12 months, as well as any future matches that have been scheduled.

Legend

Win Draw Loss Fixture

=== 2026 ===
5 March 2026 Friendly	United Arab Emirates	0–0	Tajikistan	Dubai, United Arab Emirates
20:00 UTC+4		Report; Report (FFT)	S. Saidova (penalty missed) 83'	Stadium: UAE Football Association Stadium

== Coaching staff ==
=== Current coaching staff ===
As of 20 February 2025

Position	Name
Head coach	(Tajikistan) Mubin Ergashev

=== Manager history ===
Name	Period	Matches	W	D	L	W%	Note	Ref.
(Tajikistan) Sulaymon Bobokalonov (Сулаймон Бобокалонов)	2017–2018	17	5	1	11	29.41%		
(Tajikistan) Ildar Rakhmanov (Ильдар Рахманов)	2019	4	1	0	3	25%		
(Tajikistan) Yusuf Rabiev (Юсуф Рабиев)	2021–202?	7	1	2	4	14.29%		
(Tajikistan) Mubin Ergashev	202?–present							

== Players ==
=== Current squad ===
The following players were called up for the Friendly matches against Saudi Arabia in February 2025.

- Caps and goals correct as of: 11 April 2023, after the match against Pakistan

No.	Pos.	Player	Date of birth (age)	Caps	Goals	Club
16	GK	Munisa Gulova	2 June 2000 (age 26)	1	0	(Tajikistan Football Federation) WFC Zeboniso
1	GK	Saiyora Saidova (captain)	1 February 1998 (age 28)	9	0	(Tajikistan Football Federation) WFC Zeboniso
3	GK	Ruziguli Hasan	14 July 2003 (age 23)	1	0	(Tajikistan Football Federation) WFC Zeboniso
	DF	Madna Munosbshozoda				(Tajikistan Football Federation)
4	DF	Karina Mirzoeva	12 March 2004 (age 22)	8	0	(Tajikistan Football Federation) WFC Zeboniso
8	DF	Niso Abdulloeva	24 December 2003 (age 22)	8	0	(Tajikistan Football Federation) WFC Zeboniso
17	DF	Marjona Fayzulloeva	4 September 2000 (age 25)	16	0	(Tajikistan Football Federation)
18	DF	Shamsiya Khuseinova	15 December 1996 (age 29)	9	0	(Tajikistan Football Federation) WFC Zeboniso
21	MF	Benazir Jumakhonzoda	27 October 2001 (age 24)	9	0	(Tajikistan Football Federation) Khatlon
	MF	Orom Nasrulloeva				(Tajikistan Football Federation)
	MF	Zarrina Safarzoda				(Tajikistan Football Federation)
	MF	Uljamol Elmurodova				(Tajikistan Football Federation)
	MF	Zulaykho Safarova				(Tajikistan Football Federation)
	MF	Bakhrom Takhminai				(Tajikistan Football Federation)
15	MF	Jonona Qurbonova			0	(Tajikistan Football Federation)
9	MF	Nekubakht Khudododova	23 February 2002 (age 24)	17	2	(Tajikistan Football Federation) WFC Zeboniso
10	FW	Marjona Saidova	4 June 2002 (age 24)	7	0	(Tajikistan Football Federation) WFC Zeboniso
11	FW	Komila Rasulova	18 November 2001 (age 24)	7	0	(Russian Football Union) SSHOR No.27 Sokol Moskva

=== Recent call-ups ===
The following players have been called up to the squad in the past 12 months.

Pos.	Player	Date of birth (age)	Caps	Goals	Club	Latest call-up

== Records ==
As of 13 January 2023

*Players in bold are still active, at least at club level.

=== Most capped players ===
#	Player	Year(s)	Caps	Goals
1	**Laylo Khalimova**	2017–present	26	4
2	**Munisa Mirzoeva**	2017–present	19	1
3	**Madina Fozilova**	2018–present	14	5
3	**Nekubakht Khudododova**	2018–present	14	1
3	**Sakhina Saidova**	2017–present	14	0
6	Jumakhon Shukronai	2017–2018	13	2
6	Sayramjon Kholnazarova	2017–2018	13	1
6	Marjona Fayzulloeva	2017–2018	13	0
6	Nodira Mirzoeva	2017–2018	13	0
6	Zulaikho Safarova	2017–2021	13	0

=== Top goalscorers ===
#	Player	Year(s)	Goals	Caps
1	Gulsunbi Khalimova	2018	7	4
2	**Madina Fozilova**	2018–present	6	14
3	**Laylo Khalimova**	2017–present	4	26
4	Natalia Sotnikova	2017–2021	3	10
5	**Nekubakht Khudododova**	2019–present	2	14
5	Shukronai Jumakhon	2018	2	13
6	**Munisa Mirzoeva**	2017–present	1	19
6	Sayramdzhon Kholnazarova	2018	1	13
6	Madinai Iskandari	2017	1	5
6	Jonona Halimova	2017	1	5
6	Sayyokhat Razhabova	2019–present	1	4

== Honours ==
=== Regional ===
- CAFA Women's Championship

Appearances (2): 2018, 2022

(bronze) Third place (1): 2018

== Competitive record ==
=== FIFA Women's World Cup ===
FIFA Women's World Cup record										Qualification record						
Year	Round	Position	Pld	W	D	L	GS	GA	GD	Pld	W	D	L	GS	GA	GD
(China) 1991	Part of Soviet Union									Part of Soviet Union						
(Sweden) 1995 to (Canada) 2015	Did not exist									Did not exist						
(France) 2019	Did not qualify									Via AFC Women's Asian Cup						
(Australia) (New Zealand) 2023	Did not qualify									Via AFC Women's Asian Cup						
(Brazil) 2027	Did not qualify									Via AFC Women's Asian Cup						
(Costa Rica) (Jamaica) (Mexico) (United States) 2031	To be determined									To be determined						
(United Kingdom) 2035	To be determined									To be determined						
Appearances	0/10	–	–	–	–	–	–	–	–	–	–	–	–	–	–	–

=== Olympic Games ===
Summer Olympics record										Qualification record						
Year	Round	Position	Pld	W	D*	L	GS	GA	GD	Pld	W	D*	L	GS	GA	GD
(United States) 1996 to (Brazil) 2016	Did not exist									Did not exist						
(Japan) 2020	Did not qualify									4	2	0	2	11	13	−2
(France) 2024	Did not qualify									3	0	0	3	0	12	−12
(United States) 2028	Did not qualify									Via AFC Women's Asian Cup						
(Australia) 2032	To be determined									To be determined						
Appearances'	0/9	–	–	–	–	–	–	–	–	7	2	0	5	11	25	−14

*Draws include knockout matches decided on penalty kicks.

=== AFC Women's Asian Cup ===
AFC Women's Asian Cup record										Qualification record						
Year	Round	Position	Pld	W	D*	L	GS	GA	GD	Pld	W	D*	L	GS	GA	GD
(Hong Kong) 1975 to (Japan) 1991	Part of Soviet Union									Part of Soviet Union						
(Malaysia) 1993 to (Vietnam) 2014	Did not exist									Did not exist						
(Jordan) 2018	Did not qualify									5	1	0	4	3	23	−20
(India) 2022	Did not qualify									2	1	0	1	4	7	−3
(Australia) 2026	Did not qualify									3	0	0	3	0	14	−14
(Uzbekistan) 2029	To be determined									To be determined						
Appearances	0/21	–	–	–	–	–	–	–	–	10	2	0	8	7	44	−37

*Draws include knockout matches decided on penalty kicks.

=== Asian Games ===
Asian Games record
Year	Round	Position	Pld	W	D*	L	GS	GA	GD
(China) 1990	Part of Soviet Union								
(Japan) 1994 to (South Korea) 2014	Did not exist								
(Indonesia) 2018	Group stage	11th	3	0	0	3	1	38	−37
(China) 2022	To be determined								
(Japan) 2026	To be determined								
(Qatar) 2030	To be determined								
(Saudi Arabia) 2034	To be determined								
Appearances	Group stage	11th	3	0	0	3	1	37	−36

*Draws include knockout matches decided on penalty kicks.

Asian Games History
Season	Round	Opponent	Scores	Result	Venue
(Indonesia) 2018	Group Stage	North Korea	0–16	Loss	Palembang, Indonesia
(Indonesia) 2018	Group Stage	China	0–16	Loss	Palembang, Indonesia
(Indonesia) 2018	Group Stage	Hong Kong	1–6	Loss	Palembang, Indonesia

=== CAFA Women's Championship ===
CAFA Women's Championship record
Year	Round	Position	Pld	W	D*	L	GS	GA	GD
(Uzbekistan) 2018	Third place	3rd	4	2	0	2	7	15	−8
(Tajikistan) 2022	Fifth place	5th	4	0	1	3	1	13	−12
Appearances	Third place	3rd	8	2	1	5	8	28	−20

*Denotes draws includes knockout matches decided on penalty kicks.

CAFA Women's Championship History
Season	Round	Opponent	Scores	Result	Venue
(Uzbekistan) 2018	Main tournament	Kyrgyzstan	1–0	Won	Tashkent, Uzbekistan
(Uzbekistan) 2018	Main tournament	Uzbekistan	0–11	Loss	Tashkent, Uzbekistan
(Uzbekistan) 2018	Main tournament	Iran	1–4	Loss	Tashkent, Uzbekistan
(Uzbekistan) 2018	Main tournament	Afghanistan	5–0	Won	Tashkent, Uzbekistan
(Tajikistan) 2022	Main tournament	Turkmenistan	1–1	Draw	Dushanbe, Tajikistan
(Tajikistan) 2022	Main tournament	Uzbekistan	0–6	Loss	Dushanbe, Tajikistan
(Tajikistan) 2022	Main tournament	Iran	0–5	Loss	Dushanbe, Tajikistan
(Tajikistan) 2022	Main tournament	Kyrgyzstan	0–1	Loss	Dushanbe, Tajikistan

== See also ==
- Tajikistan women's national under-17 football team
