= Kyrgyzstan women's national football team =

Women's national association football team representing Kyrgyzstan

Kyrgyzstan
- Association: Kyrgyz Football Union
- Confederation: AFC (Asia)
- Sub-confederation: CAFA (Central Asia)
- Head coach: Nematjan Zakirov
- Top scorer: Svetlana Pokachalova (5)
- FIFA code: KGZ
First colours	Second colours

FIFA ranking
- Current: 137 ▲6 (16 June 2026)
- Highest: 85 (December 2009)
- Lowest: 143 (April 2026)

First international
- Malaysia 5–1 Kyrgyzstan (Kuala Lumpur, Malaysia; 23 April 2009)

Biggest win
- Bahrain 0–5 Kyrgyzstan (Manama, Bahrain; 4 June 2026)

Biggest defeat
- Kyrgyzstan 0–12 Vietnam (Riffa, Bahrain; 24 May 2013)

CAFA Championship
- Appearances: 2 (first in 2018)
- Best result: Third Place (2022)

The Kyrgyzstan women's national football team, officially recognised by FIFA and AFC as Kyrgyz Republic, is the women's representative football team for Kyrgyzstan.

== History ==
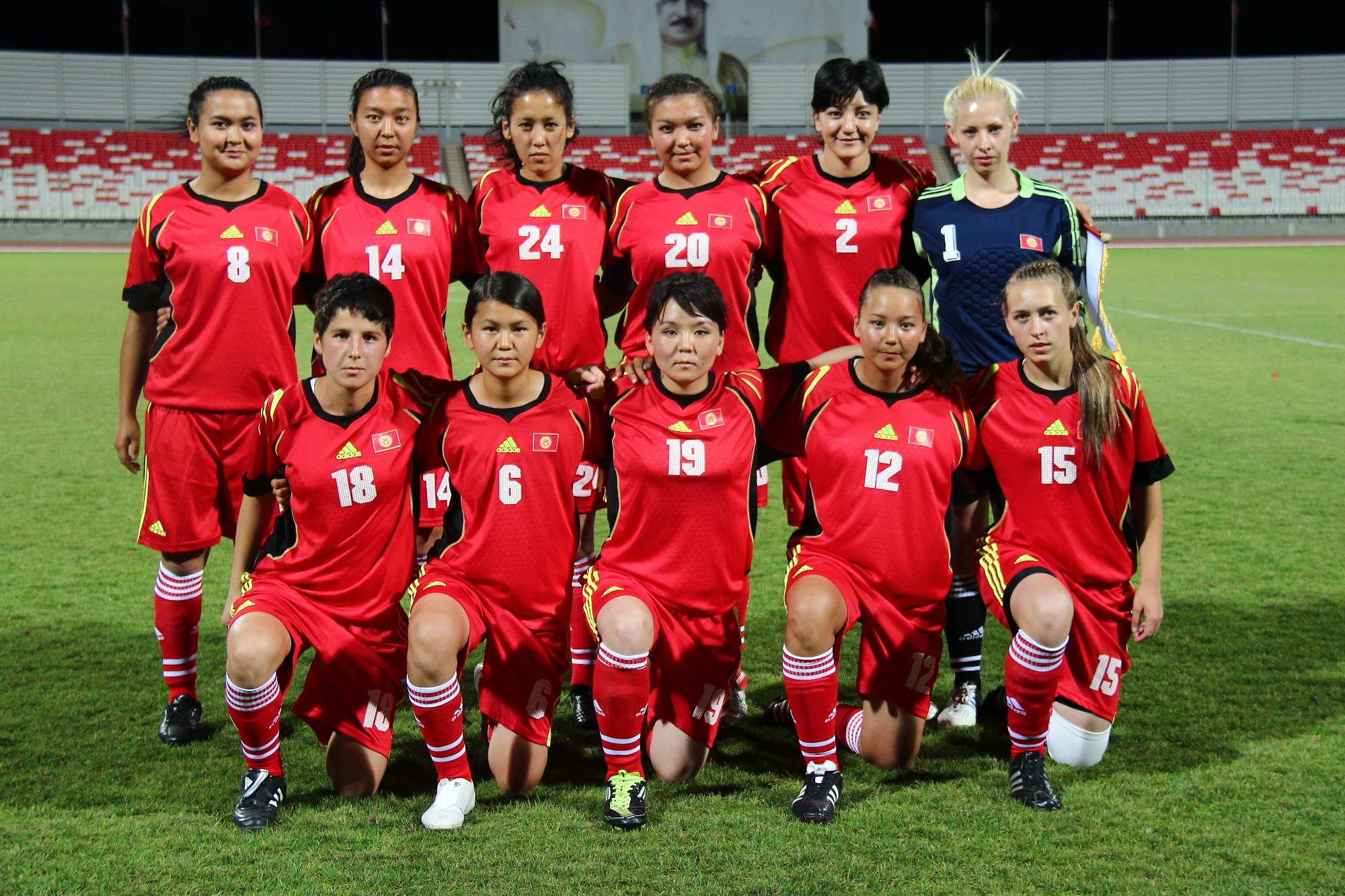
Kyrgyzstan women's national football team in May 2013.

Although formed immediately after Kyrgyzstan gained independence in 1991, the team played its first competitive match only in 2009, during the qualifiers for the 2010 AFC Women's Asian Cup. Despite a lack of experience, the team managed to progress to the second round of qualifiers, where it was knocked out by stronger rivals Vietnam and Hong Kong.

Not having had enough financial support, Kyrgyzstan did not manage to play a single friendly match until the next Asian Cup qualifiers, for the 2014 tournament, where the team took the last place in the group, losing every match.

== Results and fixtures ==
The following is a list of match results in the last 12 months, as well as any future matches that have been scheduled.

Legend

Win Draw Loss Fixture

=== 2026 ===
2 March 2026 Friendly	Saudi Arabia	2–0	Kyrgyzstan	Khobar, Saudi Arabia
22:00 UTC+3	Mukhayzin 8'; Khalid 35'	Report		Stadium: Prince Saud bin Jalawi Sports City Stadium

6 March 2026 Friendly	Saudi Arabia	3–0	Kyrgyzstan	Khobar, Saudi Arabia
22:00 UTC+3	Abdullah 22', 28', 53'	Report		Stadium: Prince Saud bin Jalawi Sports City Stadium

4 June Friendly	Bahrain	0–5	Kyrgyzstan	Manama, Bahrain
19:00 UTC+3			Saiakbaeva 21', 39'; Boronbekova 30', 52'; Ishembieva 60'	Stadium: BFA Outdoor Pitches; Referee: Alissar Baddour (Syria)

7 June Friendly	Bahrain	0–4	Kyrgyzstan	Manama, Bahrain
19:00 UTC+3			Turalieva 65'; Kurmanbekova 72'; Murzakulova 80'; Asanbekova 90+5'	Stadium: BFA Outdoor Pitches

- Kyrgyzstan Results and Fixtures – Soccerway.com

== Coaching staff ==
=== Current coaching staff ===
As of 01/06/2025

Position	Name	Ref.
Head coach	(Kyrgyzstan) Nematjan Zakirov	
Assistant coach	Batma Kokonbayeva	
Goalkeeper coach	Denis Makarov	
Team Manager	Saltanat Sultanova	

=== Manager history ===
- (Kyrgyzstan) Gulbara Umatalieva (2018–2019)
- (Kyrgyzstan) Valery Berezovsky (2019–2022)
- (Kyrgyzstan) Nematjan Zakirov (2022–present)

== Players ==
=== Current squad ===
The following players were called up for the friendly matches against Bahrain on 4 and 7 June 2026.

No.	Pos.	Player	Date of birth (age)	Club
1	GK	Dilnaz Zhenishbek Kyzy		
	GK	Begimai Cholponbekova		
	GK	Akylai Sadykova		(Kyrgyz Football Union) WFC Asiagoal-SI
2	DF	Ademi Bakytbekova		(Kyrgyz Football Union) WFC Dostuk
3	DF	Nursuluu Murzakulova		
4	DF	Aiturgan Kurmanbekova	9 November 2003 (age 22)	(Kazakhstan Football Federation) WFC Shakhter
	DF	Ulara Kachibekova		(Kyrgyz Football Union) WFC Asiagoal-SI
	DF	Adelaida Myrzalieva	8 May 2006 (age 20)	
7	MF	Nagima Turalieva		(Kyrgyz Football Union) WFC Asiagoal-SI
11	MF	Aizhan Boronbekova (Captain)	31 March 2000 (age 26)	(Kazakhstan Football Federation) FC Aktobe Women
22	MF	Aruuke Konokbaeva		(Kyrgyz Football Union) WFC Ilbirs
	MF	Nazik Ishembieva		(Kyrgyz Football Union) WFC Ilbirs
	MF	Aijamal Choiubekova		(Kyrgyz Football Union) WFC Ilbirs
	MF	Meerim Karamurzaeva		(Kyrgyz Football Union) WFC Asiagoal-SI
8	FW	Medina Rysbekova		(Kyrgyz Football Union) WFC Asiagoal-SI
10	FW	Alina Gaparova		(Kazakhstan Football Federation) FC Zhenis
15	FW	Saikal Chynybaeva		(Kyrgyz Football Union) WFC Ilbirs
17	FW	Akmaral Saiakbaeva		(Kyrgyz Football Union) WFC Ilbirs
	FW	Sumaiia Makhamatsalieva		
	FW	Anelia Asanbekova		(Kyrgyz Football Union) WFC Ilbirs

=== Recent call-ups ===
The following players have been called up a squad in the past 12 months.

Pos.	Player	Date of birth (age)	Caps	Goals	Club	Latest call-up

== Competitive record ==
=== FIFA Women's World Cup ===
FIFA Women's World Cup record									Qualification record						
Year	Result	Pld	W	D	L	GF	GA	GD	Pld	W	D	L	GF	GA	GD
(China) 1991	Part of Soviet Union								Part of Soviet Union						
(Sweden) 1995 to (China) 2007	Did not exist								Did not exist						
(Germany) 2011	Did not qualify								Via AFC Women's Asian Cup						
(Canada) 2015	Did not qualify								Via AFC Women's Asian Cup						
(France) 2019	Did not enter								Did not enter						
(Australia) (New Zealand) 2023	Did not enter								Did not enter						
(Brazil) 2027	Did not qualify								Via AFC Women's Asian Cup						
(Costa Rica) (Jamaica) (Mexico) (United States) 2031	To be determined								To be determined						
(United Kingdom) 2035	To be determined								To be determined						
Total	0/10	–	–	–	–	–	–	–	–	–	–	–	–	–	–

=== Olympic Games ===
Summer Olympics record									Qualification record						
Year	Round	Pld	W	D*	L	GF	GA	GD	Pld	W	D*	L	GF	GA	GD
(United States) 1996 to (China) 2008	Did not exist								Did not exist						
(United Kingdom) 2012 to (Japan) 2020	Did not enter								Did not enter						
(France) 2024	Did not qualify								2	0	0	2	0	9	−9
(United States) 2028	Did not qualify								Via AFC Women's Asian Cup						
(Australia) 2032	To be determined								To be determined						
Total	0/9	–	–	–	–	–	–	–	2	0	0	2	0	9	−9

*Denotes draws includes knockout matches decided on penalty kicks.

=== AFC Women's Asian Cup ===
AFC Women's Asian Cup record									Qualification record						
Year	Result	GP	W	D*	L	GS	GA	GD	GP	W	D*	L	GS	GA	GD
(Hong Kong) 1975 to (Japan) 1991	Part of Soviet Union								Part of Soviet Union						
(Malaysia) 1993 to (Vietnam) 2008	Did not exist								Did not exist						
(China) 2010	Did not qualify								6	2	0	4	8	22	−14
(Vietnam) 2014	Did not qualify								3	0	0	3	2	18	−16
(Jordan) 2018	Did not enter								Did not enter						
(India) 2022	Did not enter								Did not enter						
(Australia) 2026	Did not qualify								3	0	0	3	1	6	−5
(Uzbekistan) 2029	To be determined								To be determined						
Total	0/21	–	–	–	–	–	–	–	12	2	0	10	11	46	−35

*Draws include knockout matches decided on penalty kicks.

=== CAFA Women's Championship ===
CAFA Women's Championship record
Year	Result	GP	W	D*	L	GF	GA	GD
(Uzbekistan) 2018	Fourth Place	4	1	0	3	1	16	−15
(Tajikistan) 2022	Third Place	4	1	1	2	1	8	−7
Total	2/2	8	2	1	5	2	24	−22

*Denotes draws includes knockout matches decided on penalty kicks.

== See also ==
- Kyrgyzstan national football team
- Kyrgyzstan national under-23 football team
- Kyrgyzstan national under-20 football team
- Kyrgyzstan national under-17 football team
- Kyrgyzstan national futsal team
