= Milliy Stadium =

Stadium in Tashkent, Uzbekistan

"Milliy" stadium
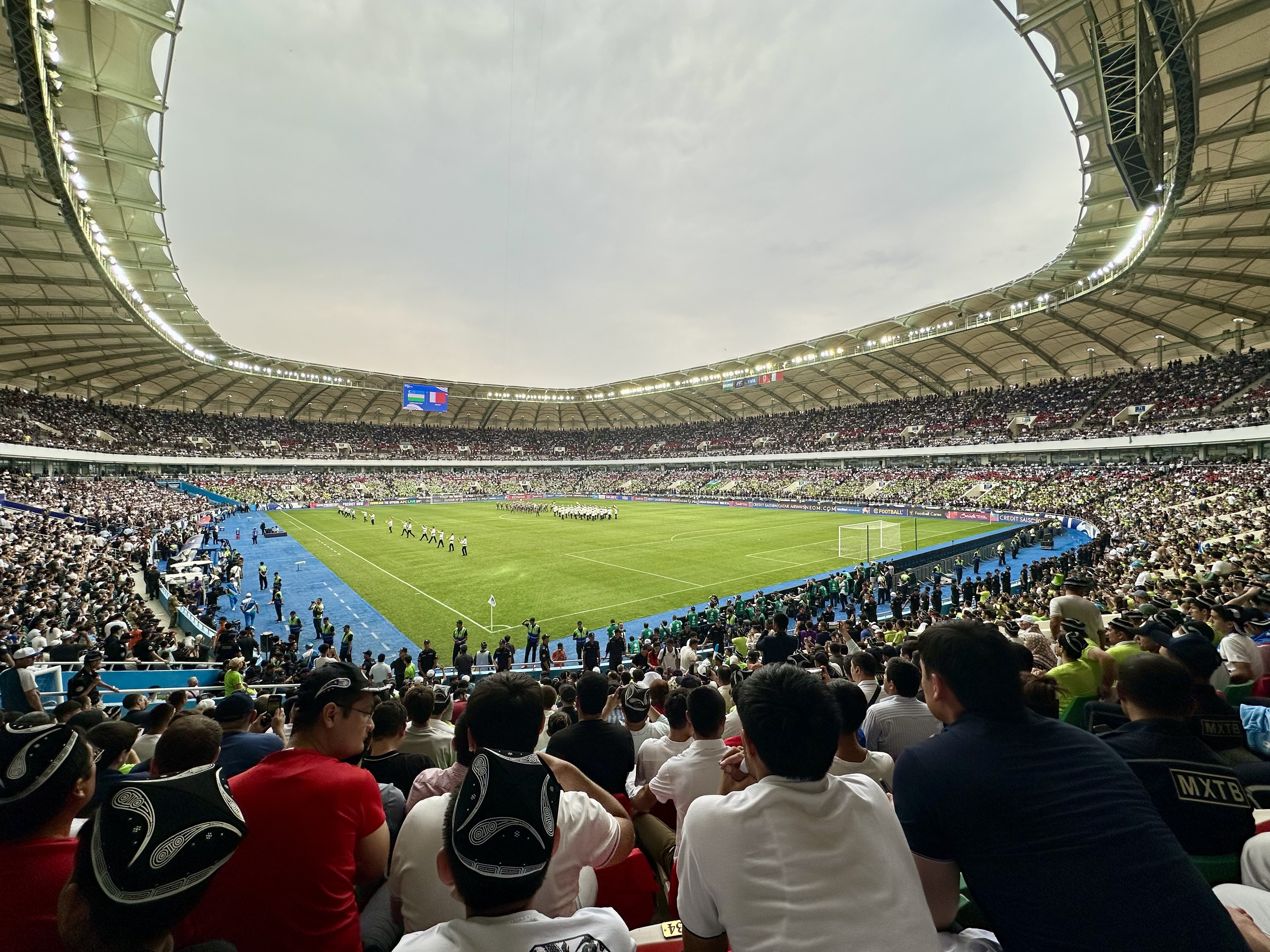
- Interactive map of "Milliy" stadium
- Full name: Tashkent City National "Milliy" Stadium
- Former names: Bunyodkor Stadium (2012–2018)
- Location: Chilanzar District, Tashkent, Uzbekistan
- Coordinates: 41°16′47″N 69°12′45″E
- Owner: Uzbekistan Football Association
- Operator: Uzbekistan Football Association; FC Bunyodkor
- Capacity: 34,800
- Executive suites: 50 (VIP); 700 (CIP)
- Surface: Grass
- Field size: 105 m × 68 m (115 yd × 74 yd)
- Public transit: Mirzo Ulughbek Metro station Bunyodkor Stadium Bus station

Construction
- Built: 2009–2012
- Opened: 28 September 2012; 14 years ago
- Cost: US$270 million
- Architect: GMP Architekten

Tenants
- Uzbekistan national football team FC Bunyodkor

The Milliy Stadium (Uzbek: Milliy stadioni), formerly known as the Bunyodkor Stadium, is a football stadium in the city of Tashkent — the capital of Uzbekistan. Located in Chilanzar District of Tashkent, on Bunyodkor Avenue. It seats 34,000 spectators, thus becoming the largest stadium in Uzbekistan. It is the home arena of the FC Bunyodkor and Uzbekistan national football teams.

== History ==
Construction of the stadium began in January 2009, at the site of the demolished MHSK Stadium, which accommodated 16,500 spectators. It was designed by GMP Architekten, an architectural firm based in Germany. The construction of the stadium was completed in August 2012.

The stadium was opened on September 28, 2012, with the participation of the first President of the Republic of Uzbekistan — Islam Karimov, as well as fans and spectators. The grand opening was accompanied by songs by famous Uzbek pop singers, and a friendly match was held between the Tashkent football clubs Bunyodkor and Pakhtakor (3:3).

The first official match at the Bunyodkor Stadium was played on March 26, 2013, between the national teams of Uzbekistan and Lebanon as part of the 2014 FIFA World Cup qualification. The national team of Uzbekistan won with a score of 1:0. Subsequently, the Bunyodkor Stadium became the main home stadium for the Uzbekistan national team. Prior to this, the main home stadium of the national team was another Tashkent stadium, Pakhtakor Stadium.

On June 11, 2018 by the decision of the executive committee of the Uzbekistan Football Association, the name was changed to "Milliy Stadium."

== Appearance ==
The stadium is located in the Chilanzar District of the city of Tashkent, on Bunyodkor Avenue. It holds 34,000 spectators, has two tiers (floors) and more than 50 sectors. There are VIP (about 50 places/cabins) and CIP (700 places) lodges. There are several dozen places for wheelchair users. The stadium has a restaurant and café bars, fast food establishments, toilets, fitness clubs, and other facilities.

There are two large monitors, a modern lighting system — 3000 lux, a modern audio system, four changing rooms for football players and team members, a conference room and other auxiliary rooms. Under the stadium there is a parking lot for 350 cars. The stadium also houses the Museum of the History of Uzbekistan Football, which includes trophies of the Bunyodkor football club and other items. The size of the field is 105 by 68 meters.

Celebration of qualification for the 2026 FIFA World Cup at the Milliy Stadium, after the Uzbekistan-Qatar match, 10 June 2025.

The Bunyodkor Stadium complex occupies 37 hectares of land. In addition to the main stadium, it has seven fields. The complex also houses a youth football school, a swimming pool and other sports facilities. In the evening, the stadium facade is illuminated by a lighting system called the "Flame of the East."

== Gallery ==
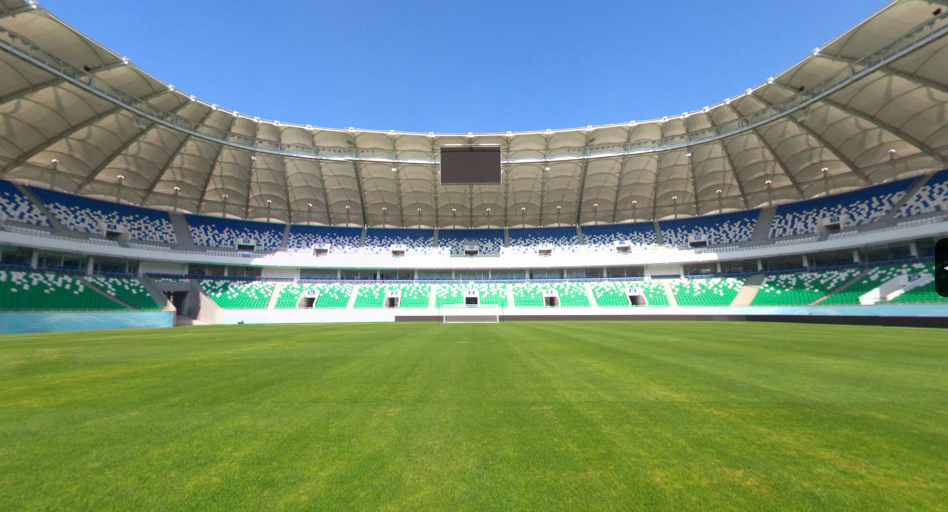
Green space

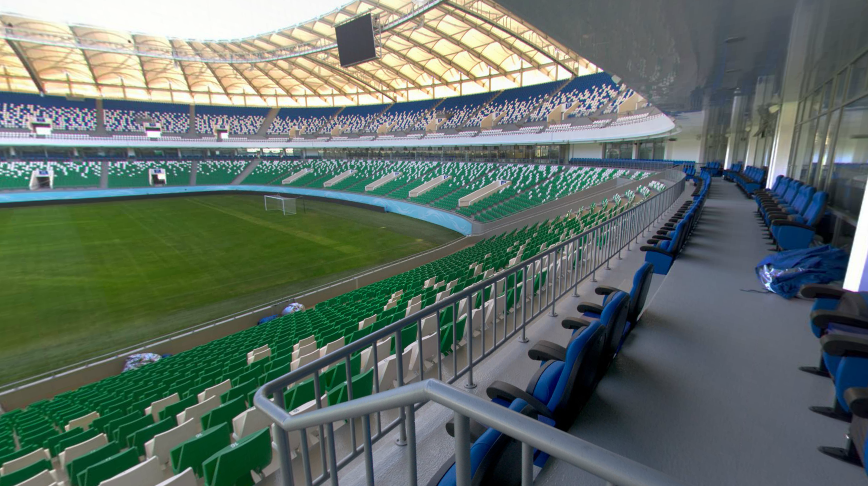
Interior view

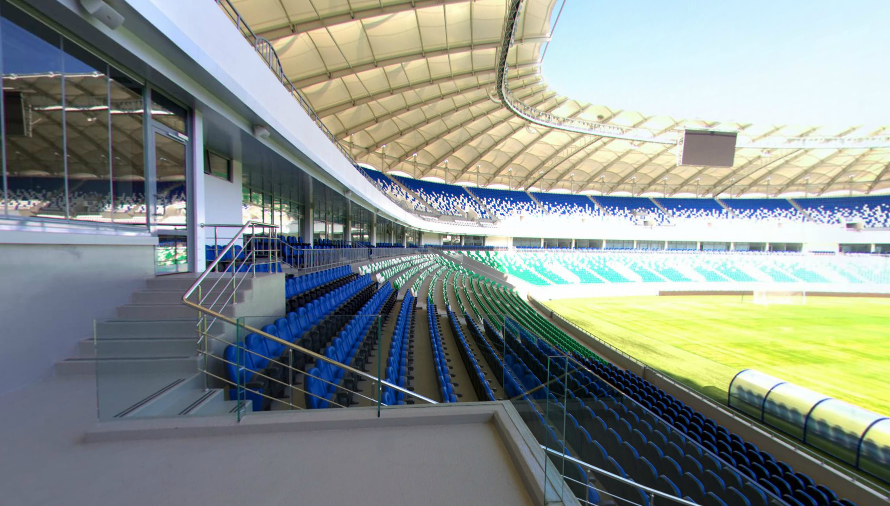
Seating arrangement

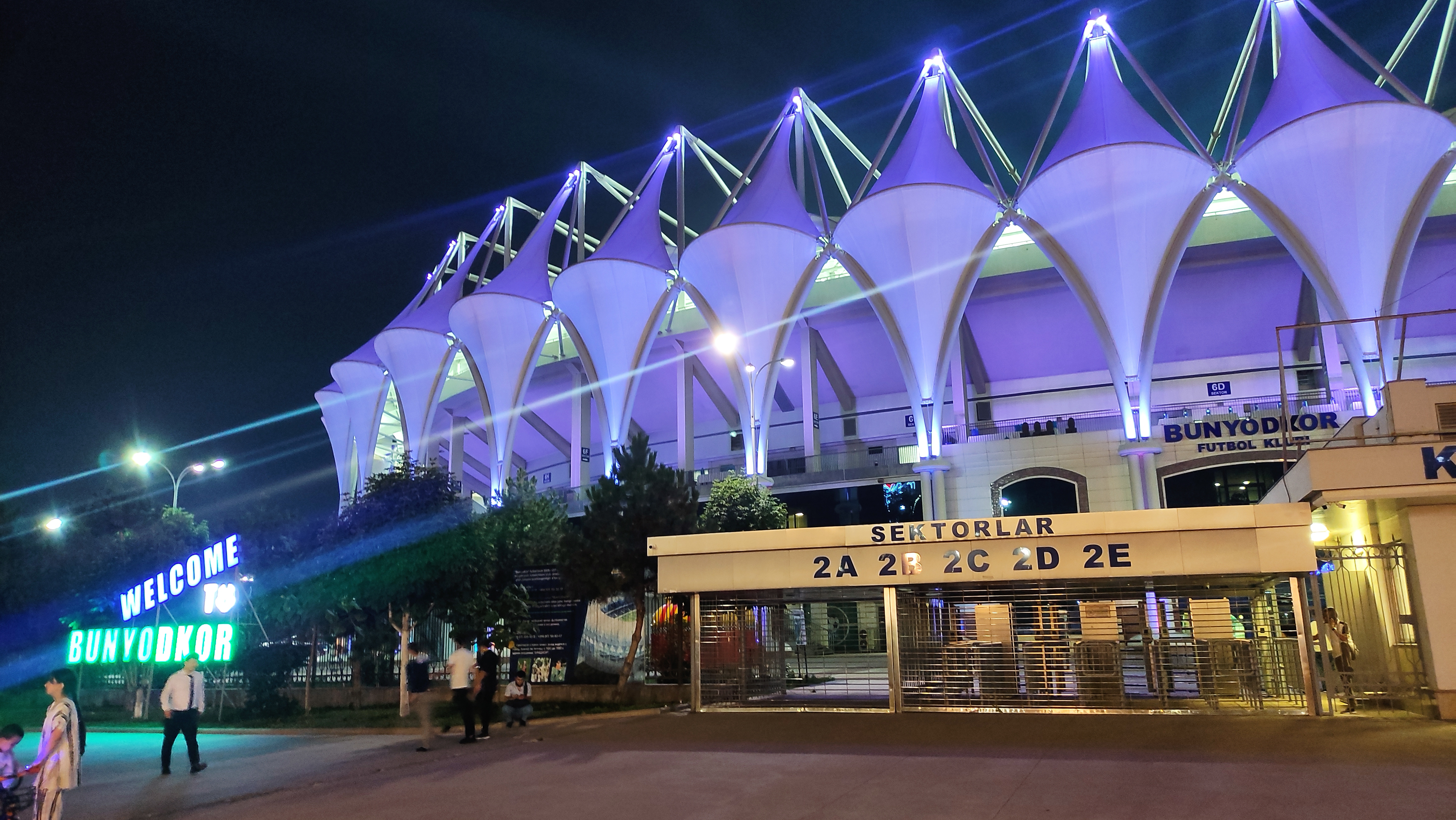
Appearance from the outside
