= Turkmenistan women's national football team results =

The Turkmenistan women's national football team is the representative women's association football team of Turkmenistan. Its governing body is the Football Federation of Turkmenistan (TFF) and it competes as a member of the Asian Football Confederation (AFC).

The national team's first activity was in 2019, when they played a friendly game against Kazakhstan. They competed in the 2019 Turkish Women's Cup, finishing in last place. As of June 2022, Turkmenistan is unranked in the FIFA Women's World Rankings.

== Record per opponent ==
Key

Positive balance (more wins than losses)
Neutral balance (as many wins as losses)
Negative balance (more losses than wins)

The following table shows Turkmenistan women's all-time official international record per opponent:

Opponent	Pld	W	D	L	GF	GA	GD	W%	Confederation
Bahrain	1	0	1	0	2	2	0	0.00	AFC
Bangladesh	1	0	0	1	0	7	−7	0.00	AFC
India	1	0	0	1	0	10	−10	0.00	AFC
Iran	1	0	0	1	0	4	−4	0.00	AFC
Jordan	1	0	0	1	0	3	−3	0.00	AFC
Kazakhstan	1	0	0	1	0	6	−6	0.00	UEFA
Kyrgyzstan	1	0	1	0	0	0	0	0.00	AFC
Myanmar	1	0	0	1	0	8	−8	0.00	AFC
Romania	1	0	0	1	0	13	−13	0.00	UEFA
Tajikistan	1	0	1	0	1	1	0	0.00	AFC
Uzbekistan	2	0	0	2	1	17	−16	0.00	AFC
Total	12	0	3	9	4	71	−67	00.00	—

== Results ==
Legend

Win Draw Lose Fixture

=== 2019 ===
24 February 2019 Friendly	Kazakhstan	6–0	Turkmenistan	Alanya, Turkey
13:00 UTC+3	Vildanova 6', 22', 33'; Kulmagambetova 17', 57'; Karibayeva 25'	Report

27 February 2019 2019 Turkish Cup GS	Romania	13–0	Turkmenistan	Alanya, Turkey
13:00 UTC+3	Herczeg 10', 45', 56'; Bălăceanu 17', 54'; Gődér 23'; Marinescu 28'; Ciolacu 33'; Sandu 40'; Bâtea 45+1', 68'; Carp 63', 74'

1 March 2019 2019 Turkish Cup GS	Turkmenistan	0–10	India	Alanya, Turkey
13:00 UTC+3			Grace 7'; Yadav 17', 37', 71'; Tamang 51', 83'; Ranjana 60', 62'; Kamaraj 77'; Indumathi 87'

3 March 2019 2019 Turkish Cup GS	Uzbekistan	11–1	Turkmenistan	Side, Turkey
13:00 UTC+3	Shypturova 2' (o.g.); Turdybaeva 26'; Kudratova 28', 36', 48'; Burkhonova 58'; Kurbonova 60', 79', 80', 82', 85'		Bagşyýewa 67'

5 March 2019 2019 Turkish Cup 7th place	Jordan	3–0	Turkmenistan	Alanya, Turkey
8:30 UTC+3	Hina 5'; Al-Naber 24', 73'

=== 2022 ===
8 July 2022 2022 CAFA Women's Championship	Turkmenistan	1–1	Tajikistan	Dushanbe, Tajikistan
22:00 UTC+5	Prýannikowa 65'	Report	Mirzoeva 7'	Stadium: Republic Central Stadium; Referee: Malika Kadyrova (Kyrgyzstan)

11 July 2022 2022 CAFA Women's Championship	Turkmenistan	0–0	Kyrgyzstan	Dushanbe, Tajikistan
19:00 UTC+5		Report		Stadium: Republic Central Stadium; Referee: Mahsa Ghorbani (Iran)

14 July 2022 2022 CAFA Women's Championship	Uzbekistan	6–0	Turkmenistan	Dushanbe, Tajikistan
19:00 UTC+5	Zaynitdinova 6'; Mamatkarimova 50', 58'; Norboeva 64'; Zaripova 79'; Khusniddinova 90+2'	Report		Stadium: Republic Central Stadium; Referee: Nodira Mirzoeva (Tajikistan)

17 July 2022 2022 CAFA Women's Championship	Iran	4–0	Turkmenistan	Dushanbe, Tajikistan
19:00 UTC+5	Foroozandeh 4'; Motevallitaher 28'; Chatrenoor 69'; Zolfi 74'	Report		Stadium: Republic Central Stadium; Referee: Nodira Mirzoeva (Tajikistan)

=== 2025 ===
29 June 2026 AFC Asian Cup qualification	Myanmar	8–0	Turkmenistan	Yangon, Myanmar
16:00 UTC+6:30	Win Win 11', 28', 38'; Khin Mo Mo Tun 45', 76'; San Thaw Thaw 48'; May Htet Lu 52'; Tun Shwe Yee 90+4'	Report		Stadium: Thuwunna Stadium; Referee: Mu Mingxin (China)

2 July 2026 AFC Asian Cup qualification	Turkmenistan	2–2	Bahrain	Yangon, Myanmar
16:00 UTC+6:30	Çaryýewa 84'; Alymjanowa 89'	Report	Sabkar 87'; Al-Isa 90+6'	Stadium: Thuwunna Stadium

5 July 2026 AFC Asian Cup qualification	Bangladesh	7–0	Turkmenistan	Yangon, Myanmar
19:00 UTC+6:30		Report		Stadium: Thuwunna Stadium

== See also ==
- Turkmenistan national football team results
