= Kalus (disambiguation) =

Kalus is a village in West Azerbaijan Province, Iran.

Kalus (Persian: كالوس) may also refer to:

- Kalus-e Markazi, Kohgiluyeh and Boyer-Ahmad Province
- Kalus-e Olya, Kohgiluyeh and Boyer-Ahmad Province
- Kalus-e Sofla, Kohgiluyeh and Boyer-Ahmad Province
- Kalus-e Vosta, Kohgiluyeh and Boyer-Ahmad Province
- Ashley Kalus, businesswoman and former director of public engagement for Illinois governor Bruce Rauner
