= Jadval =

Jadval (Persian: جدول) may refer to:

- Jadval-e Darta Mokhtar
- Jadval-e Ghureh (disambiguation)
- Jadval-e Now (disambiguation)
- Jadval-e Torki
