= Chenarestan =

Chenarestan or Chenarastan (Persian: چنارستان) may refer to:

- Chenarestan, Khuzestan
- Chenarestan-e Olya, Kohgiluyeh and Boyer-Ahmad Province
- Chenarestan-e Sofla, Kohgiluyeh and Boyer-Ahmad Province
- Chenarestan-e Vosta, Kohgiluyeh and Boyer-Ahmad Province
- Chenarestan, Lorestan
- Chenarestan, Delijan, Markazi Province
- Chenarestan, Shazand, Markazi Province
