= Ganjehi-ye Seh Riz =

Ganjei-ye Bozorg گنجه‌ئی Ganjei-ye Sariz, Ganjei
- Ganjei-ye Bozorg
- Interactive map of Ganjei-ye Bozorg
- Coordinates: 30.7667°N 51.5333°E
- Country: Iran
- Province: Kohgiluyeh and Boyer-Ahmad
- County: Boyer-Ahmad
- Bakhsh: Central
- Rural District: Sarrud-e Shomali
- Elevation: 1,980 m (6,500 ft)

Population (2021)
  - Total: 1,819
- Time zone: UTC+3:30 (IRST)

Ganjei-ye Bozorg (Persian: گنجه‌ئی, also known as Ganjei-ye Sariz and Ganjei-ye Seriz) is a village in Sarrud-e Shomali Rural District, in the Central District of Boyer-Ahmad County, Kohgiluyeh and Boyer-Ahmad Province, Iran. It is located approximately 10 kilometers from the city of Yasuj, on the slopes of the Dena Mountains.

== People ==
The inhabitants are ethnic Lurs and belong to the independent Ganjei tribe, which is considered one of the traditional clans of the Boyer-Ahmad confederation. They speak Luri with the distinct local Ganjei dialect.

== Tribe ==
The Ganjei tribe is one of the independent and long-established tribes within the Boyer-Ahmad region, with deep historical roots in this area.

== Geography and Climate ==
The village lies at an elevation of approximately 1,980 meters above sea level and experiences a cold mountainous climate. Summers are mild and winters are snowy. The area features oak, plane trees, hawthorn, and wild pistachio. Water resources include mountain springs and rivers originating from the Dena range.

== Social Structure ==
Historically, the village had a social structure divided into "Khajehs" (locally influential families) and "Rayats" (ordinary farmers and residents). This traditional hierarchy still subtly influences the community.

== Population ==
According to the 2021 Census of Iran, the village had a population of 1,819 people.

== Attractions ==
Tang-e Ganjei (Ganjei Gorge) is a well-known natural attraction near the village, located on the Yasuj–Sisakht road. It is a popular destination for nature lovers, with its dense trees, flowing springs, cold river, and scenic mountain views.
