= Jadval-e Now =

Jadval-e Now or Javdal Now (Persian: جدول نو) may refer to:

- Jadval-e Now, Fars
- Javdal-e Now, alternate name of Eslamiyeh, Fars
- Jadval-e Now, Shiraz, Fars Province
- Jadval-e Now, Kerman
- Jadval-e Now, Kohgiluyeh and Boyer-Ahmad
