= Tang-e Moshkan =

Tang-e Moshkan تنگ مشكان
- Village
- Location within Iran
- Coordinates: 30°25′32″N 51°47′07″E
- Country: Iran
- Province: Kohgiluyeh and Boyer-Ahmad
- County: Boyer-Ahmad
- Bakhsh: Central
- Rural District: Sarrud-e Jonubi

Population (2006)
  - Total: 65
- Time zone: UTC+3:30 (IRST)
  - Summer (DST): UTC+4:30 (IRDT)

Tang-e Moshkan (Persian: تنگ مشكان, also Romanized as Tang-e Moshkān) is a village in Sarrud-e Jonubi Rural District, in the Central District of Boyer-Ahmad County, Kohgiluyeh and Boyer-Ahmad Province, Iran. At the 2006 census, its population was 65, in 14 families.
