= Balahzar =

Neighborhood in Kohgiluyeh and Boyer-Ahmad province, Iran

Balahzar Persian: بلهزار
- Neighborhood
- Location within Iran
- Coordinates: 30°42′42″N 51°33′09″E
- Country: Iran
- Province: Kohgiluyeh and Boyer-Ahmad
- County: Boyer-Ahmad
- District: Central
- City: Yasuj

Population (2016)
  - Total: 3,478
- Time zone: UTC+3:30 (IRST)

Balahzar (Persian: بلهزار) (Note: Also romanized as Balahzār and Baleh Zār) is a neighborhood in the city of Yasuj of the Central District of Boyer-Ahmad County, Kohgiluyeh and Boyer-Ahmad province, Iran.

== Demographics ==
=== Population ===
At the time of the 2006 National Census, Balahzar's population was 1,898 in 407 households, when it was a village in Sarrud-e Shomali Rural District. The following census in 2011 counted 3,235 people in 778 households. The 2016 census measured the population of the village as 3,478 people in 889 households.

After the census, the city of Madavan, and the villages of Balahzar, Jadval-e Ghureh-ye Mehrian, Madavan-e Sofla, Mehrian, Sarab-e Taveh, Servak, and Tall Khosrow, were merged with the city of Yasuj.
