= Qalat-e Markazi-ye Hamidabad =

Qalat-e Markazi-ye Hamidabad قلات مركزي حميداباد
- Village
- Location within Iran
- Coordinates: 30°33′46″N 51°41′24″E
- Country: Iran
- Province: Kohgiluyeh and Boyer-Ahmad
- County: Boyer-Ahmad
- Bakhsh: Central
- Rural District: Sarrud-e Jonubi

Population (2006)
  - Total: 104
- Time zone: UTC+3:30 (IRST)
  - Summer (DST): UTC+4:30 (IRDT)

Qalat-e Markazi-ye Hamidabad (Persian: قلات مركزي حميداباد, also Romanized as Qalāt-e Markazī-ye Ḩamīdābād; also known as Qalāt-e Ḩamīdābād-e Markazī) is a village in Sarrud-e Jonubi Rural District, in the Central District of Boyer-Ahmad County, Kohgiluyeh and Boyer-Ahmad Province, Iran. At the 2006 census, its population was 104, in 32 families.
