= Abrizi Parikdan =

Abrizi Parikdan ابريزي پريكدان
- Village
- Location within Iran
- Coordinates: 30°30′10″N 51°38′16″E
- Country: Iran
- Province: Kohgiluyeh and Boyer-Ahmad
- County: Boyer-Ahmad
- Bakhsh: Central
- Rural District: Sarrud-e Jonubi

Population (2006)
  - Total: 24
- Time zone: UTC+3:30 (IRST)
  - Summer (DST): UTC+4:30 (IRDT)

Abrizi Parikdan (Persian: ابريزي پريكدان, also Romanized as Ābrīzī Parīkdān; also known as Ābrīzī) is a village in Sarrud-e Jonubi Rural District, in the Central District of Boyer-Ahmad County, Kohgiluyeh and Boyer-Ahmad Province, Iran. At the 2006 census, its population was 24, in 6 families.
