= Kord Laghari =

Kord Laghari كردلاغري
- Village
- Location within Iran
- Coordinates: 30°38′52″N 51°33′26″E
- Country: Iran
- Province: Kohgiluyeh and Boyer-Ahmad
- County: Boyer-Ahmad
- Bakhsh: Central
- Rural District: Sarrud-e Jonubi

Population (2006)
  - Total: 403
- Time zone: UTC+3:30 (IRST)
  - Summer (DST): UTC+4:30 (IRDT)

Kord Laghari (Persian: كردلاغري, also Romanized as Kord Lāgharī; also known as Kord-e Lāgharīb) is a village in Sarrud-e Jonubi Rural District, in the Central District of Boyer-Ahmad County, Kohgiluyeh and Boyer-Ahmad Province, Iran. At the 2006 census, its population was 403, in 83 families.
