= Mehrababad, Kohgiluyeh and Boyer-Ahmad =

Mehrababad محراب اباد
- Village
- Location within Iran
- Coordinates: 30°29′29″N 51°44′29″E
- Country: Iran
- Province: Kohgiluyeh and Boyer-Ahmad
- County: Boyer-Ahmad
- Bakhsh: Central
- Rural District: Sarrud-e Jonubi

Population (2006)
  - Total: 35
- Time zone: UTC+3:30 (IRST)
  - Summer (DST): UTC+4:30 (IRDT)

Mehrababad (Persian: محراب اباد, also Romanized as Mehrābābād) is a village in Sarrud-e Jonubi Rural District, in the Central District of Boyer-Ahmad County, Kohgiluyeh and Boyer-Ahmad Province, Iran. At the 2006 census, its population was 35, in 8 families.
