= Karamatollah Malek-Hosseini =

Iranian Ayatollah (1924–2012)

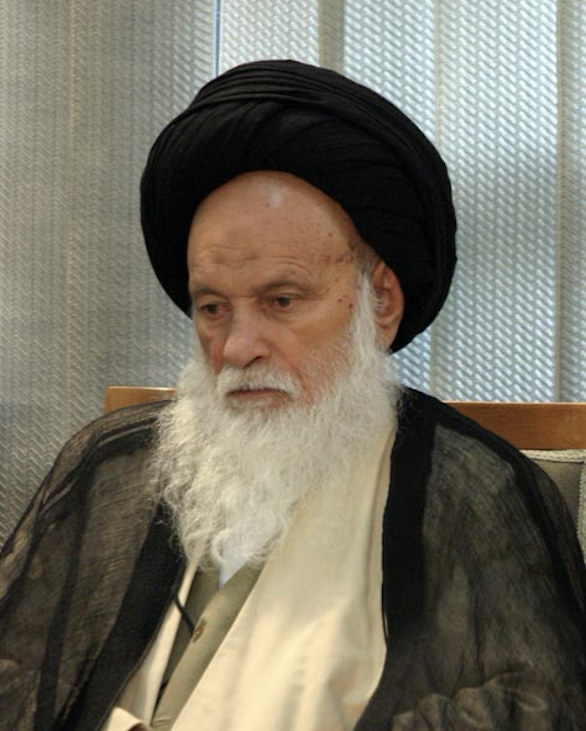
- Seyed Karamatollah Malek-Hosseini attending an Assembly of Experts meeting in the house of Ali Khamenei, 2006.

Member of Second, Third, and Fourth terms of the Assembly of Experts
- In office 8 October 1990 – 2 November 2012
- Preceded by: Ghorban Ali Shahmiri
- Succeeded by: Seyed Sharaf-Aldin Malek-Hosseini
- Constituency: Kohgiluyeh and Boyer-Ahmad Province
- سید کرامت‌الله ملک‌حسینی
- Title: Ayatollah

Personal life
- Born: 1924 Gusheh-ye Shahzadeh Qasem, Sublime State of Iran
- Died: 2 November 2012 (aged 87–88) Yasuj, Iran
- Children: Seyed Sharaf-Aldin Malek-Hosseini
- Parent: Seyed Sadr-Aldin Malek-Hosseini (father)
- Education: Qom Hawza

Religious life
- Religion: Islam
- Jurisprudence: Twelver Shia Islam

Muslim leader
- Teacher: Ruhollah Khomeini, Hossein Borujerdi, Muhammad Husayn Tabatabai, Seyed Mohammad Taqi Khonsari, Seyyed Mohammad Hojjat Kooh Kamari, Seyed Mohammad Mohaqeq Damad
- Students: Seyed Ali Asghar Hosseini, Seyed Sharaf-Aldin Malek-Hosseini

Seyed Ayatollah Karamatollah Malek-Hosseini (Persian: سید کرامت‌الله ملک‌حسینی; 1924 – 2 November 2012) was an Iranian Ayatollah and member of the Second, Third and Fourth terms of the Assembly of Experts.

== Biography ==
Karamatollah Malek Hosseini was born in a village called Gusheh-ye Shahzadeh Qasem in Kohgiluyeh and Boyer-Ahmad Province to a religious family in 1924. His father Seyed Sadr-Aldin Malek-Hosseini was a prominent cleric in Boyer-Ahmad. He studied Islam in both Shiraz and Qom. During the Iranian Revolution he was a critic of the Pahlavi regime and was arrested by SAVAK. After the revolution he served in the Assembly of Experts, as well as representing the Supreme Leader of Iran in Kohgiluyeh and Boyer-Ahmad Province. After his death, his son Sharaf-Aldin took his spot for the remainder of the fourth term and then was elected again for the Fifth term.

== Religious education ==
From an early age he was learning Islam and Arabic from his father. When he was 15, he migrated to Shiraz to continue his education in high school. Afterwards, in 1941 he officially began his Islamic Studies. There, he learnt under Abdul-Karim Haeri Yazdi and Mirza Ahmad Darabi. After, he finally migrated to Qom to further his Islamic studies in Qom Seminary. There, he was taught by the likes of Hossein Borujerdi, Ruhollah Khomeini, Muhammad Husayn Tabatabai, Seyyed Mohammad Hojjat Kooh Kamari, Seyed Mohammad Taqi Khonsari, and Mohammad Mohaqeq Damad. There he mastered his knowledge in Islamic jurisprudence, interpretation of Quran, and Usool Fiqh. It was in Qom where he reached the level of Ijtihad. After the passing of Hossein Borujerdi in 1961, he migrated back to Shiraz to begin teaching at the Khan Theological School.

== Political activism ==
While teaching in Shiraz, Karamatollah began to resent Mohammad Reza Pahlavi and the Pahlavi regime. This happened primarily after the attack on Feyziyeh Seminary on 22 March 1963. SAVAK agents and operatives disguised as farmers stormed the seminary, beating many clerics and killing young Seyed Younes Rudbari as he was beaten to death. Another 2–3 students were killed due to injuries sustained from being beaten and thrown off rooftops. Afterwards, Karamatollah would often give Khutbahs in the Habib Mosque in Shiraz showing his resentment to the Pahlavi regime. His infamous arrest by SAVAK was in 1978 where a crowd that gathered at Habib Mosque clashed with SAVAK. Three protestors were killed as a result of gunfire, which then led to the arrest of Seyed Karamatollah. His arrest led to protests by tribesmen across the Kohgiluyeh and Boyer-Ahmad province, and Shiraz. As a result of these protests he was released 2 days later.

== Students ==
1. Seyed Ali Asghar Hosseini
2. Seyed Sharafaddin Malek-Hosseini
3. Seyed Ali Mohammad Bozorgvari
4. Mohammad Reza Adinehvand
5. Sheikh Qadir Haydari Fasai
6. Sheikh Mostafa Zamani
7. Sheikh Abutaleb Abadi Genavehi
8. Sheikh Yousef Salmanzadeh Borazjani
9. Sheikh Khodamorad Raji Abarqawi

== Death ==
Seyed Karamatollah passed away on the morning of 2 November 2012 in Namazi Hospital, Shiraz. His death prompted Ali Khamenei expressing his condolences. Many had attended his funeral as he was a very popular figure in Kohgiluyeh and Boyer-Ahmad, he was buried in his hometown Gusheh-ye Shahzadeh Qasem.

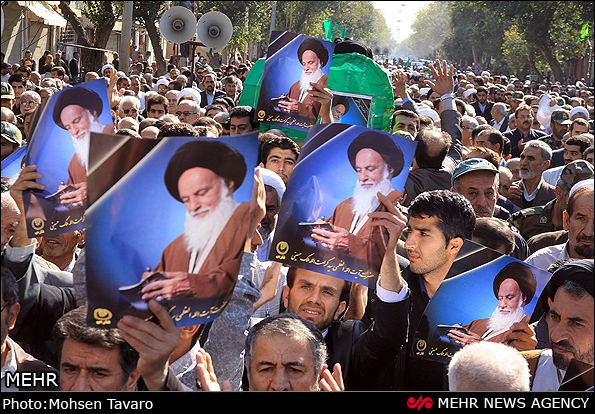
Funeral of Ayatollah Karamatollah in Shiraz.

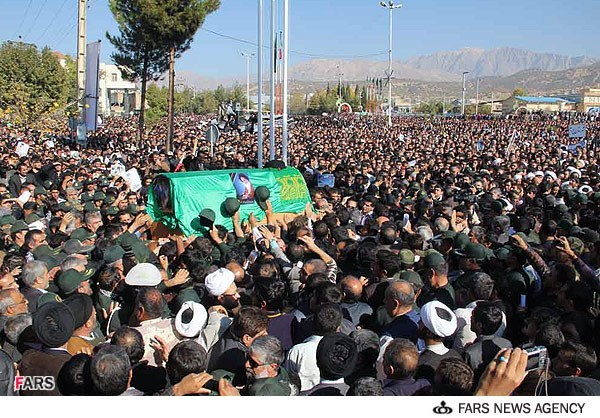
Funeral of Ayatollah Karamatollah in Yasuj.

== See also ==
- List of ayatollahs
- Usul Fiqh in Ja'fari school
- List of members in the Second Term of the Council of Experts
- List of members in the Third Term of the Council of Experts
- List of members in the Fourth Term of the Council of Experts
