= Gusheh-ye Shahzadeh Qasem =

Village in Kohgiluyeh and Boyer-Ahmad province, Iran

Gusheh-ye Shahzadeh Qasem Persian: گوشه شاهزاده قاسم
- Village
- Location within Iran
- Coordinates: 30°44′06″N 51°31′56″E
- Country: Iran
- Province: Kohgiluyeh and Boyer-Ahmad
- County: Boyer-Ahmad
- District: Central
- Rural District: Sarrud-e Shomali

Population (2016)
  - Total: 2,881
- Time zone: UTC+3:30 (IRST)

Gusheh-ye Shahzadeh Qasem (Persian: گوشه شاهزاده قاسم) (Note: Also romanized as Gūsheh Shāhzādeh Qāsem and Gūsheh-ye Shāhzādeh Qāsem; also known as Gūsheh) is a village in, and the capital of, Sarrud-e Shomali Rural District of the Central District of Boyer-Ahmad County, Kohgiluyeh and Boyer-Ahmad province, Iran. The previous capital of the rural district was the village of Madavan-e Olya, which had been elevated to city status as Madavan and later merged with the city of Yasuj.

== Demographics ==
=== Population ===
At the time of the 2006 National Census, the village's population was 1,193 in 254 households. The following census in 2011 counted 1,734 people in 258433households. The 2016 census measured the population of the village as 2,881 people in 718 households.

== Notable people ==
- Karamatollah Malek-Hosseini, Cleric and politician
