= Seh Riz =

Seh Riz سه ريز
- Village
- Location within Iran
- Coordinates: 30°44′48″N 51°28′44″E
- Country: Iran
- Province: Kohgiluyeh and Boyer-Ahmad
- County: Boyer-Ahmad
- Bakhsh: Central
- Rural District: Sarrud-e Shomali

Population (2006)
  - Total: 213
- Time zone: UTC+3:30 (IRST)
  - Summer (DST): UTC+4:30 (IRDT)

Seh Riz (Persian: سه ريز, also Romanized as Seh Rīz; also known as Serīz) is a village in Sarrud-e Shomali Rural District, in the Central District of Boyer-Ahmad County, Kohgiluyeh and Boyer-Ahmad Province, Iran. At the 2006 census, its population was 213, in 45 families.
