= Parikedun =

Parikedun پريكدون
- Village
- Location within Iran
- Coordinates: 30°32′40″N 51°36′37″E
- Country: Iran
- Province: Kohgiluyeh and Boyer-Ahmad
- County: Boyer-Ahmad
- Bakhsh: Central
- Rural District: Sarrud-e Jonubi

Population (2006)
  - Total: 203
- Time zone: UTC+3:30 (IRST)
  - Summer (DST): UTC+4:30 (IRDT)

Parikedun (Persian: پريكدون, also Romanized as Parīkedūn; also known as Parikedan) is a village in Sarrud-e Jonubi Rural District, in the Central District of Boyer-Ahmad County, Kohgiluyeh and Boyer-Ahmad Province, Iran. At the 2006 census, its population was 203, in 50 families.
