= Tang-e Tamoradi waterfall =

Iranian waterfall

- Location: Yasuj
- Total height: 15 m (49 ft)

Tamoradi Strait waterfall is a waterfall in Kohgiluyeh and Boyer Ahmad province. This waterfall is located 45 kilometres (28 mi) away west of Yasouj city on Sepidar road. Aryu Barzan's war with Alexander the Great probably took place in this strait, as well as the Tamoradi strait war that took place between the imperial forces and Boyer Ahmad's lor tribes was in this area.

== Name ==
The reason for naming this area is because of the presence of one of the big clans of Boyer Ahmad tribe named Tamoradi.
