= Khalafabad, Kohgiluyeh and Boyer-Ahmad =

Village in Iran

Khalafabad خلف اباد
- Village
- Location within Iran
- Coordinates: 30°37′46″N 51°35′01″E
- Country: Iran
- Province: Kohgiluyeh and Boyer-Ahmad
- County: Boyer-Ahmad
- Bakhsh: Central
- Rural District: Sarrud-e Jonubi

Population (2006)
  - Total: 538
- Time zone: UTC+3:30 (IRST)
  - Summer (DST): UTC+4:30 (IRDT)

Khalafabad (Persian: خلف اباد, also Romanized as Khalafābād) is a village in Sarrud-e Jonubi Rural District, in the Central District of Boyer-Ahmad County, Kohgiluyeh and Boyer-Ahmad Province, Iran. At the 2006 census, its population was 538, in 102 families.
