= Servak, Kohgiluyeh and Boyer-Ahmad =

Neighborhood in Kohgiluyeh and Boyer-Ahmad province, Iran

Servak Persian: سروک
- Neighborhood
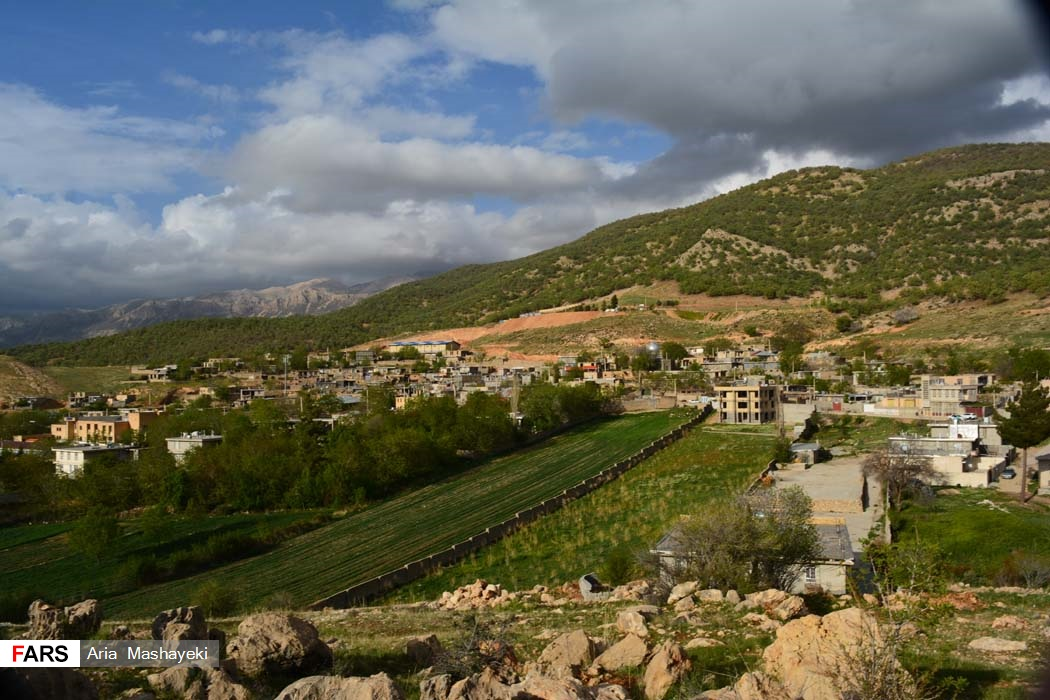
- Servak

- Location within Iran
- Coordinates: 30°37′01″N 51°36′49″E
- Country: Iran
- Province: Kohgiluyeh and Boyer-Ahmad
- County: Boyer-Ahmad
- District: Central
- City: Yasuj

Population (2016)
  - Total: 5,130
- Time zone: UTC+3:30 (IRST)

Servak (Persian: سروک) (Note: Also romanized as Serūk) is a neighborhood in the city of Yasuj of the Central District of Boyer-Ahmad County, Kohgiluyeh and Boyer-Ahmad province, Iran.

== Demographics ==
=== Population ===
At the time of the 2006 National Census, Servak's population was 2,210 in 434 households, when it was a village in Sarrud-e Jonubi Rural District. The following census in 2011 counted 3,340 people in 847 households. The 2016 census measured the population of the village as 5,130 people in 1,346 households.

After the census, the city of Madavan, and the villages of Balahzar, Jadval-e Ghureh-ye Mehrian, Madavan-e Sofla, Mehrian, Sarab-e Taveh, Servak, and Tall Khosrow, were merged with the city of Yasuj.
