= Madavan =

Madavan or Madovan or Madevan (Persian: مادوان) may refer to:

- Madevan, Darab, Fars province
- Madavan, Jahrom, Fars province
- Madavan, Khafr, Jahrom County, Fars province
- Madavan, Iran, a former city in Kohgiluyeh and Boyer-Ahmad province
- Madavan-e Olya, Kohgiluyeh and Boyer-Ahmad province
- Madavan-e Sofla, Kohgiluyeh and Boyer-Ahmad province

== See also ==
- Madhavan (disambiguation)
