= Jadval-e Ghureh =

Jadval-e Ghureh (Persian: جدول غوره) may refer to:

- Jadval-e Ghureh-ye Mehrian
- Jadval-e Ghureh-ye Mokhtar
- Jadval-e Ghureh-ye Nareh Gah
