= Kalus-e Olya =

Kalus-e Olya كالوس عليا
- Village
- Location within Iran
- Coordinates: 30°40′37″N 51°28′14″E
- Country: Iran
- Province: Kohgiluyeh and Boyer-Ahmad
- County: Boyer-Ahmad
- Bakhsh: Central
- Rural District: Sarrud-e Jonubi

Population (2006)
  - Total: 103
- Time zone: UTC+3:30 (IRST)
  - Summer (DST): UTC+4:30 (IRDT)

Kalus-e Olya (Persian: كالوس عليا, also Romanized as Kālūs-e ‘Olyā; also known as Sar Dasht-e Kālūs) is a village in Sarrud-e Jonubi Rural District, in the Central District of Boyer-Ahmad County, Kohgiluyeh and Boyer-Ahmad Province, Iran.

== Census ==
At the 2006 census, its population was 103, in 22 families.
