= Mehrian, Kohgiluyeh and Boyer-Ahmad =

Neighborhood in Kohgiluyeh and Boyer-Ahmad province, Iran

Mehrian Persian: مهريان
- Neighborhood
- Location within Iran
- Coordinates: 30°42′02″N 51°33′50″E
- Country: Iran
- Province: Kohgiluyeh and Boyer-Ahmad
- County: Boyer-Ahmad
- District: Central
- City: Yasuj

Population (2016)
  - Total: 9,421
- Time zone: UTC+3:30 (IRST)

Mehrian (Persian: مهريان) (Note: Also romanized as Mehreyān and Mehrīān; also known as Mehrabān and Mehrīān-e ‘Olyā) is a neighborhood in the city of Yasuj of the Central District of Boyer-Ahmad County, Kohgiluyeh and Boyer-Ahmad province, Iran.

== Demographics ==
=== Population ===
At the time of the 2006 National Census, Mehrian's population was 4,857 in 1,000 households, when it was a village in Sarrud-e Shomali Rural District. The following census in 2011 counted 7,320 people in 1,714 households. The 2016 census measured the population of the village as 9,421 people in 2,368 households. It was the most populous village in its rural district.

After the census, the city of Madavan, and the villages of Balahzar, Jadval-e Ghureh-ye Mehrian, Madavan-e Sofla, Mehrian, Sarab-e Taveh, Servak, and Tall Khosrow, were merged with the city of Yasuj.
