= Aliabad-e Sartol, Kohgiluyeh and Boyer-Ahmad =

Village in Kohgiluyeh and Boyer-Ahmad province, Iran

Aliabad-e Sartol Persian: علي ابادسرتل
- Village
- Location within Iran
- Coordinates: 30°40′19″N 51°31′24″E
- Country: Iran
- Province: Kohgiluyeh and Boyer-Ahmad
- County: Boyer-Ahmad
- District: Central
- Rural District: Sarrud-e Jonubi

Population (2016)
  - Total: 1,148
- Time zone: UTC+3:30 (IRST)

Aliabad-e Sartol (Persian: علي ابادسرتل) (Note: Also romanized as ‘Alīābād-e Sartol; also known as ‘Alīābād) is a village in, and the capital of, Sarrud-e Jonubi Rural District of the Central District of Boyer-Ahmad County, Kohgiluyeh and Boyer-Ahmad province, Iran. The previous capital of the rural district was the village of Tall Khosrow.

== Demographics ==
=== Population ===
At the time of the 2006 National Census, the village's population was 323 in 68 households. The following census in 2011 counted 554 people in 141 households. The 2016 census measured the population of the village as 1,148 people in 293 households.
