= Madavan-e Sofla =

Neighborhood in Kohgiluyeh and Boyer-Ahmad province, Iran

Madavan-e Sofla Persian: مادوان سفلي
- Neighborhood
- Location within Iran
- Coordinates: 30°42′50″N 51°32′33″E
- Country: Iran
- Province: Kohgiluyeh and Boyer-Ahmad
- County: Boyer-Ahmad
- District: Central
- City: Yasuj

Population (2016)
  - Total: 7,722
- Time zone: UTC+3:30 (IRST)

Madavan-e Sofla (Persian: مادوان سفلي) (Note: Also romanized as Mādavān-e Soflá and Mādovān-e Soflá; also known as Jowhavey, Mādavān-e Pā’īn, and Madovān Pā‘īn) is a neighborhood in the city of Yasuj of the Central District of Boyer-Ahmad County, Kohgiluyeh and Boyer-Ahmad province, Iran.

== Demographics ==
=== Population ===
At the time of the 2006 National Census, Madavan-e Sofla's population was 3,239 in 623 households, when it was a village in Sarrud-e Shomali Rural District. The following census in 2011 counted 6,089 people in 1,228 households. The 2016 census measured the population of the village as 7,722 people in 1,698 households.

After the census, the city of Madavan, and the villages of Balahzar, Jadval-e Ghureh-ye Mehrian, Madavan-e Sofla, Mehrian, Sarab-e Taveh, Servak, and Tall Khosrow, were merged with the city of Yasuj.
