= 2019 Turkish Women's Cup =

Tournament details
- Host country: Turkey
- Dates: 27 February 2019– 5 March 2019
- Teams: 8 (from 2 confederations)
- Venue: 2 (in 2 host cities)

Final positions
- Champions: France B
- Runners-up: Romania
- Third place: Northern Ireland
- Fourth place: Uzbekistan

Tournament statistics
- Matches played: 16
- Goals scored: 82 (5.13 per match)
- Top scorer: (Northern Ireland) Rachel Furness
- Best player(s): (Uzbekistan) Tanzilya Zarbiyeva (defender) (Uzbekistan) Rushaniya Safina (midfielder)
- All statistics correct as of 6 March 2019.

The 2019 Turkish Women's Cup is the third edition of the Turkish Women's Cup, an invitational women's football tournament held annually in Turkey. It takes place from 27 February to 5 March 2019.

== Format ==
The eight invited teams were split into two groups to play a round-robin tournament. Points awarded in the group stage follow the standard formula of three points for a win, one point for a draw and zero points for a loss. In the case of two teams being tied on the same number of points in a group, their head-to-head result determine the higher place.

Every team will play each other in the group once with the group-toppers making it to the final. There will also be matches for the third and the fourth slot, the fifth and the sixth slot, and the seventh and the eighth places.

== Teams ==
Team	FIFA Rankings (7 December 2018)
Romania	41
Jordan	52
Northern Ireland	61
India	62
Kazakhstan	71
Turkmenistan	NR
Uzbekistan	NR
France B	—

=== Squads ===
The team had to name a final squad of over 20 players, including two or three goalkeepers. Players in the final squad may be replaced for serious injury up to 24 hours prior to kickoff of the team's first match and such replacements do not need to have been named in the preliminary squad.

== Group stage ==
=== Group A ===
- Times listed are UTC+03:00.

Pos	Team	Pld	W	D	L	GF	GA	GD	Pts
1	Romania	3	3	0	0	17	0	+17	9
2	Uzbekistan	3	2	0	1	12	2	+10	6
3	India	3	1	0	2	10	4	+6	3
4	Turkmenistan	3	0	0	3	1	34	−33	0

Rules for classification: 1) Points; 2) Goal difference; 3) Goals scored
27 February 2019
13:00

India	0–1	Uzbekistan
	AIFF	Burkhanova 8'

Evrenseki Stadium, Side, Turkey
27 February 2019
13:00

Romania	13–0	Turkmenistan
Herczeg 10', 45', 56'; Bălăceanu 17', 54'; Gődér 23'; Marinescu 28'; Ciolacu 33'; Sandu 40'; Bâtea 45+1', 68'; Carp 63', 74'	FRF EVIMA

Gold city, Alanya, Turkey

1 March 2019
13:00

Turkmenistan	0–10	India
	AIFF EVIMA	Grace 7'; Yadav 17', 37', 71'; Tamang 51', 83'; Ranjana 60', 62'; Sumithra 77'; Indumathi 87'

Gold city, Alanya, Turkey
1 March 2019
17:30

Uzbekistan	0–1	Romania
	FRF	Voicu 10'

Evrenseki Stadium, Side, Turkey

3 March 2019
13:00

Uzbekistan	11–1	Turkmenistan
Şepturowa 2' (o.g.); Turdybaeva 26'; Kudratova 28', 36', 48'; Burkhonova 58'; Kurbonova 60', 79', 80', 82', 85'		Bagşyýewa 67'

Hane, Side, Turkey
3 March 2019
19:30

Romania	3−0	India
Vătafu 15', 87'; Spânu 30'	FRF AIFF

Gold city, Alanya, Turkey

=== Group B ===
- Times listed are UTC+03:00.

Pos	Team	Pld	W	D	L	GF	GA	GD	Pts
1	France B	3	3	0	0	16	1	+15	9
2	Northern Ireland	3	2	0	1	11	3	+8	6
3	Kazakhstan	3	0	1	2	1	8	−7	1
4	Jordan	3	0	1	2	1	17	−16	1

Rules for classification: 1) Points; 2) Goal difference; 3) Goals scored
27 February 2019
17:30

Jordan	0–6	Northern Ireland
	TIFA	Magill 5'; Furness 33', 87', 90'; Hutton 44'; Monters 65'

Evrenseki Stadium, Side, Turkey
27 February 2019
17:30

France B	3–0	Kazakhstan
Thomas 24'; Bigot 60'; Léger 90'	FFF

Gold city, Alanya, Turkey

1 March 2019
11:00

Kazakhstan	1–1	Jordan
Kulmagambetova 31' (pen.)	KFF	Al-Naber 13'

Evrenseki Stadium, Side, Turkey
1 March 2019
11:00

France B	3−1	Northern Ireland
Thibaud 5'; Jaurena 88' (pen.); Léger 93'	FFF TIFA	Furness 53'

Gold city, Alanya, Turkey

3 March 2019
12:00

France B	10–0	Jordan
Matéo 7', 11', 16'; Rougemont 29'; Lahmari 37'; Khelifi 47'; Corboz 53'; Léger 67'; Laurent 73'; Diallo 82'	FFF

Gold City, Alanya, Turkey
3 March 2019
15:30

Northern Ireland	4−0	Kazakhstan
Furness 27'; Vance 44', ??'; Magill 90'	TIFA KFF

Hane, Side, Turkey

== Ranking of teams for placement matches ==
Rank	Team	Group	Pos	Pld	Pts	GD	GF	Qualification
1	Romania	A	1	3	9	+17	17	Final
2	France B	B	1	3	9	+15	16	Final
3	Uzbekistan	A	2	3	6	+10	12	Third place game
4	Northern Ireland	B	2	3	6	+8	11	Third place game
5	India	A	3	3	3	+6	10	Fifth place game
6	Kazakhstan	B	3	3	1	-7	1	Fifth place game
7	Jordan	B	4	3	1	-16	1	Seventh place game
8	Turkmenistan	A	4	3	0	-33	1	Seventh place game

== Placement matches ==
=== Seventh place game ===
5 March 2019
8:30

Jordan	3–0	Turkmenistan
Raya Hina 5'; Natasha 24', 73'	JFF EVIMA

Gold city, Alanya, Turkey

=== Fifth place game ===
5 March 2019
12:00

India	0–0	Kazakhstan
	AIFF EVIMA
Penalties
Ashalata (penalty scored); Manisha (penalty missed); Dalima (penalty scored); Grace (penalty scored); Sanju (penalty missed)	3–4	(penalty missed) Orynbassarova; (penalty scored) Zhumabaikyzy; (penalty scored) Myasnikova; (penalty scored) Nurusheva; (penalty scored) Kulmagambetova

Gold city, Alanya, Turkey

=== Third place game ===
5 March 2019
10:00

Uzbekistan	1–2	Northern Ireland
Nazimova 66'	TIFA	McFadden 5'; Furness 18'

Gold city, Alanya, Turkey

=== Final ===
5 March 2019
14:00

Romania	0–7	France B
	FRF FootoFeminin	Thomas 7', 11', 90+3'; Matéo 45'; Jaurena 48'; Diallo 73' (pen.); Morroni 90'

Gold city, Alanya, Turkey

== Goalscorers ==
There have been 82 goals scored in 16 matches, for an average of 5.12 goals per match.

6 goals

- (Northern Ireland) Rachel Furness

5 goals

- (Uzbekistan) Nilufar Kudratova

4 goals

- (France) Lindsey Thomas
- (France) Clara Matéo

3 goals

- (France) Marie-Charlotte Léger
- (India) Sanju Yadav
- (Romania) Andrea Herczeg
- (Uzbekistan) Shakhnoza Kurbanova

2 goals

- (France) Inès Jaurena
- (France) Aminata Diallo
- (India) Ranjana Chanu
- (India) Anju Tamang
- (Northern Ireland) Simone Magill
- (Northern Ireland) Demi Vance
- (Romania) Ioana Bălăceanu
- (Romania) Mara Bâtea
- (Romania) Cristina Carp
- (Romania) Ștefania Vătafu
- (Uzbekistan) Malika Burkhanova

1 goal

- (France) Justine Rougemont
- (France) Anissa Lahmari
- (France) Léa Khelifi
- (France) Daphne Corboz
- (France) Emelyne Laurent
- (France) Julie Thibaud
- (France) Maureen Bigot
- (France) Perle Morroni
- (India) Dangmei Grace
- (India) Indumathi Kathiresan
- (India) Sumithra Kamaraj
- (Jordan) Stephanie Al-Naber
- (Jordan) Raya Hina
- (Jordan) Natasha Al-Naber
- (Kazakhstan) Kamila Kulmagambetova
- (Northern Ireland) Ashley Hutton
- (Northern Ireland) Kerry Monters
- (Northern Ireland) McFadden
- (Romania) Mihaela Ciolacu
- (Romania) Brigitta Gődér
- (Romania) Mădălina Marinescu
- (Romania) Bianca Sandu
- (Romania) Andreea Voicu
- (Romania) Florentina Spânu
- (Turkmenistan) Bakshiyeva
- (Uzbekistan) Feruza Turdybaeva
- (Uzbekistan) Nazimova

1 own goal

- (Turkmenistan) Shypturova (against Uzbekistan)

== See also ==
- Women's football in Turkey
- Turkish women in sports
- Women's football
