= Chenarestan-e Vosta =

Chenarestan-e Vosta چنارستان وسطي
- Village
- Location within Iran
- Coordinates: 30°37′45″N 51°33′24″E
- Country: Iran
- Province: Kohgiluyeh and Boyer-Ahmad
- County: Boyer-Ahmad
- Bakhsh: Central
- Rural District: Sarrud-e Jonubi

Population (2006)
  - Total: 179
- Time zone: UTC+3:30 (IRST)
  - Summer (DST): UTC+4:30 (IRDT)

Chenarestan-e Vosta (Persian: چنارستان وسطي, also Romanized as Chenārestān-e Vosţá; also known as Chenārestān-e Vasaţ) is a village in Sarrud-e Jonubi Rural District, in the Central District of Boyer-Ahmad County, Kohgiluyeh and Boyer-Ahmad Province, Iran. At the 2006 census, its population was 179, in 34 families.
