= Tall Khosrow =

Neighborhood in Kohgiluyeh and Boyer-Ahmad province, Iran

Tall Khosrow Persian: تل خسرو
- Neighborhood
- Location within Iran
- Coordinates: 30°36′22″N 51°35′05″E
- Country: Iran
- Province: Kohgiluyeh and Boyer-Ahmad
- County: Boyer-Ahmad
- District: Central
- City: Yasuj

Population (2016)
  - Total: 4,534
- Time zone: UTC+3:30 (IRST)

Tall Khosrow (Persian: تل خسرو) (Note: Also romanized as Tal-e Khosrow; also known as Tal-e Khosravī, Tall Khosravī Pā’īn, and Tall-e Khosrow-ye Soflá) is a neighborhood in the city of Yasuj of the Central District of Boyer-Ahmad County, Kohgiluyeh and Boyer-Ahmad province, Iran. As a village, it was the capital of Sarrud-e Jonubi Rural District until its capital was transferred to the village of Aliabad-e Sartol.

== Demographics ==
=== Population ===
At the time of the 2006 National Census, Tall Khosrow's population was 1,822 in 366 households, when it was a village in Sarrud-e Jonubi Rural District. The following census in 2011 counted 3,169 people in 793 households. The 2016 census measured the population of the village as 4,534 people in 1,200 households.

After the census, the city of Madavan, and the villages of Balahzar, Jadval-e Ghureh-ye Mehrian, Madavan-e Sofla, Mehrian, Sarab-e Taveh, Servak, and Tall Khosrow, were merged with the city of Yasuj.
