= Yasouj University =

University in Iran

Yasuj University
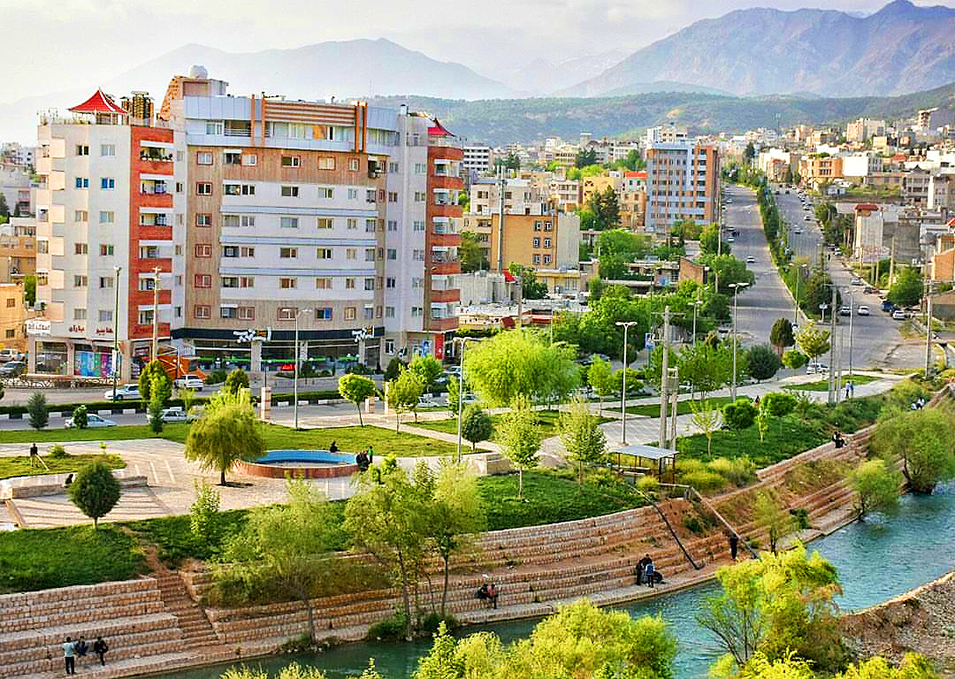
- Type: Public
- Location: Yasuj, Iran
- Website: http://en.yu.ac.ir/

Yasuj University is a public university in the province of Kohgiloyeh and Boyerahmad, Iran.It offers a range of undergraduate and postgraduate programs. The location is in Yasuj. With 300 academic members spread across two campuses and five faculties, Yasuj University educates more than 7,000 students. The university offers master's degrees in 52 subjects, doctoral degrees in 22 subjects, and undergraduate admissions in 31 subjects.

== History ==
Yasuj University was established in 1983. In the beginning, it was a part of Shiraz University and named as Technical Institute of Yasuj. It was active in the field of rural development and mechanics of welding. The Technical Institute was promoted to Yasuj University and was separated from Shiraz University in 1992. The Yasuj University was started with three faculties of Science, Engineering, and Agricultural. Furthermore, a high school and college center is affiliated with the University.

At the moment the university has six faculties of engineering, science, agricultural, science-industry, mining of Choram which related to the Institute of Natural Resources and Environment, and social studies and language of indigenous. It also includes a College University.

The University has 22 departments offering a total of 50 educational branches for undergraduate students, 120 educational branches for master's students, and 40 educational branches for Ph.D. students, with over 6,000 students in total.

== University Ranking ==
In 2020, Times Higher Education placed Yasuj University in the 401-500 range globally.
