= Chenarestan-e Sofla =

Chenarestan-e Sofla چنارستان سفلي
- Village
- Location within Iran
- Coordinates: 30°38′02″N 51°32′33″E
- Country: Iran
- Province: Kohgiluyeh and Boyer-Ahmad
- County: Boyer-Ahmad
- Bakhsh: Central
- Rural District: Sarrud-e Jonubi

Population (2006)
  - Total: 1,137
- Time zone: UTC+3:30 (IRST)
  - Summer (DST): UTC+4:30 (IRDT)

Chenarestan-e Sofla (Persian: چنارستان سفلي, also Romanized as Chenārestān-e Soflá; also known as Chenārestān-e Pā’īn) is a village in Sarrud-e Jonubi Rural District, in the Central District of Boyer-Ahmad County, Kohgiluyeh and Boyer-Ahmad Province, Iran. At the 2006 census, its population was 1,137, in 214 families.
