= Kalus-e Sofla =

Kalus-e Sofla كالوس سفلي
- Village
- Location within Iran
- Coordinates: 30°42′13″N 51°26′20″E
- Country: Iran
- Province: Kohgiluyeh and Boyer-Ahmad
- County: Boyer-Ahmad
- Bakhsh: Central
- Rural District: Sarrud-e Jonubi

Population (2006)
  - Total: 264
- Time zone: UTC+3:30 (IRST)
  - Summer (DST): UTC+4:30 (IRDT)

Kalus-e Sofla (Persian: كالوس سفلي, also Romanized as Kālūs-e Soflá; also known as Kālūs-e Pā’īn and Kālūs Pā’īn) is a village in Sarrud-e Jonubi Rural District, in the Central District of Boyer-Ahmad County, Kohgiluyeh and Boyer-Ahmad Province, Iran. At the 2006 census, its population was 264, in 55 families.
