= Jadval-e Ghureh-ye Nareh Gah =

Jadval-e Ghureh-ye Nareh Gah جدول غوره نره گاه
- Village
- Location within Iran
- Coordinates: 30°41′19″N 51°32′27″E
- Country: Iran
- Province: Kohgiluyeh and Boyer-Ahmad
- County: Boyer-Ahmad
- Bakhsh: Central
- Rural District: Sarrud-e Jonubi

Population (2006)
  - Total: 76
- Time zone: UTC+3:30 (IRST)
  - Summer (DST): UTC+4:30 (IRDT)

Jadval-e Ghureh-ye Nareh Gah (Persian: جدول غوره نره گاه, also Romanized as Jadval-e Ghūreh-ye Nareh Gāh; also known as Jadval-e Ghūreh-ye Bālā and Jadval-e Ghūreh-ye ‘Olyā) is a village in Sarrud-e Jonubi Rural District, in the Central District of Boyer-Ahmad County, Kohgiluyeh and Boyer-Ahmad Province, Iran. At the 2006 census, its population was 76, in 14 families.
