= Kalus-e Markazi =

Kalus-e Markazi كالوس مركزي
- Village
- Location within Iran
- Coordinates: 30°41′30″N 51°27′04″E
- Country: Iran
- Province: Kohgiluyeh and Boyer-Ahmad
- County: Boyer-Ahmad
- Bakhsh: Central
- Rural District: Sarrud-e Jonubi

Population (2006)
  - Total: 204
- Time zone: UTC+3:30 (IRST)
  - Summer (DST): UTC+4:30 (IRDT)

Kalus-e Markazi (Persian: كالوس مركزي, also Romanized as Kālūs-e Markazī) is a village in Sarrud-e Jonubi Rural District, in the Central District of Boyer-Ahmad County, Kohgiluyeh and Boyer-Ahmad Province, Iran. At the 2006 census, its population was 204, in 46 families.
