= Sarab-e Taveh =

Neighborhood in Kohgiluyeh and Boyer-Ahmad province, Iran

Sarab-e Taveh Persian: سرابتاوه
- Neighborhood
- Location within Iran
- Coordinates: 30°35′53″N 51°34′34″E
- Country: Iran
- Province: Kohgiluyeh and Boyer-Ahmad
- County: Boyer-Ahmad
- District: Central
- City: Yasuj

Population (2016)
  - Total: 11,195
- Time zone: UTC+3:30 (IRST)

Sarab-e Taveh (Persian: سرابتاوه) (Note: Also romanized as Sarāb-e Ţāveh; also known as Sarāb Tāveh-ye Bālā and Sarāb-e Tāveh-ye ‘Olyā) is a neighborhood in the city of Yasuj of the Central District of Boyer-Ahmad County, Kohgiluyeh and Boyer-Ahmad province, Iran.

== Demographics ==
=== Population ===
At the time of the 2006 National Census, Sarab-e Taveh's population was 5,590 in 1,167 households, when it was a village in Sarrud-e Jonubi Rural District. The following census in 2011 counted 9,703 people in 2,449 households. The 2016 census measured the population of the village as 11,195 people in 2,932 households. It was the most populous village in its rural district.

After the census, the city of Madavan, and the villages of Balahzar, Jadval-e Ghureh-ye Mehrian, Madavan-e Sofla, Mehrian, Sarab-e Taveh, Servak, and Tall Khosrow, were merged with the city of Yasuj.
