= Shabnam Behesht =

Iranian footballer (born 1998)

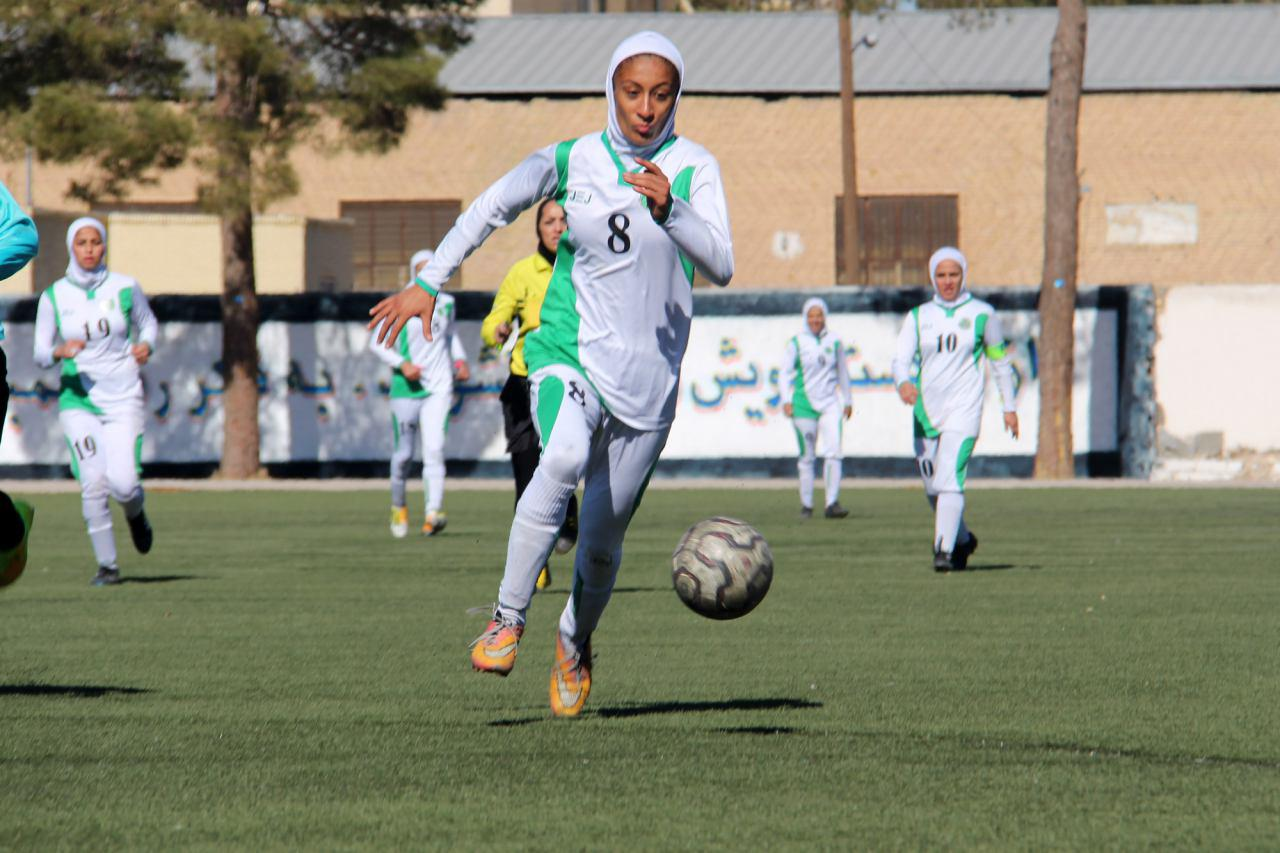

Personal information
- Full name: Shabnam Behesht
- Date of birth: 30 December 1998 (age 27)
- Place of birth: Dehdasht, Iran
- Height: 1.70 m (5 ft 7 in)
- Position: Forward

Team information
- Current team: Shahrdari Sirjan

Senior career*
Years	Team	Apps	(Gls)
- Shahrdari Sirjan

International career
2013	Iran U16	6	(2)
	Iran U19	23	(7)
2015	Iran	6	(3)
- * Club domestic league appearances and goals

Shabnam Behesht (Persian: شبنم بهشت; born 30 December 1998 in Dehdasht) is an Iranian footballer who plays as a forward for Kowsar Women Football League club Shahrdari Sirjan. She has also played for the Iran women's national team.

== International goals ==
No.	Date	Venue	Opponent	Score	Result	Competition
1.	22 March 2015	Taipei Municipal Stadium, Taipei, Taiwan	Laos	1–0	5–1	2016 AFC Women's Olympic Qualifying Tournament
2.	22 March 2015	Taipei Municipal Stadium, Taipei, Taiwan	Laos	3–1	5–1	2016 AFC Women's Olympic Qualifying Tournament
3.	8 July 2022	Pamir Stadium, Dushanbe, Tajikistan	Kyrgyzstan	1–0	1–0	2022 CAFA Women's Championship
4.	12 June 2025	National Football Center Field 2, Tehran, Iran	Iraq	?–0	7–0	Friendly
5.	24 October 2025	Jawaharlal Nehru Stadium, Shillong, India	Nepal	3–0	3–0	Friendly
