= Jadval-e Ghureh-ye Mehrian =

Neighborhood in Kohgiluyeh and Boyer-Ahmad province, Iran

Jadval-e Ghureh-ye Mehrian Persian: جدول غوره مهريان
- Neighborhood
- Location within Iran
- Coordinates: 30°41′00″N 51°32′24″E
- Country: Iran
- Province: Kohgiluyeh and Boyer-Ahmad
- County: Boyer-Ahmad
- District: Central
- City: Yasuj

Population (2016)
  - Total: 435
- Time zone: UTC+3:30 (IRST)

Jadval-e Ghureh-ye Mehrian (Persian: جدول غوره مهريان) (Note: Also romanized as Jadval-e Ghūreh-ye Mehrīān; also known as Jadval Ghūreh) is a neighborhood in the city of Yasuj of the Central District of Boyer-Ahmad County, Kohgiluyeh and Boyer-Ahmad province, Iran.

== Demographics ==
=== Population ===
At the time of the 2006 National Census, Jadval-e Ghureh-ye Mehrian's population was 216 in 48 households, when it was a village in Sarrud-e Shomali Rural District. The following census in 2011 counted 341 people in 84 households. The 2016 census measured the population of the village as 435 people in 121 households.

After the census, the city of Madavan, and the villages of Balahzar, Jadval-e Ghureh-ye Mehrian, Madavan-e Sofla, Mehrian, Sarab-e Taveh, Servak, and Tall Khosrow, were merged with the city of Yasuj.
