= Jadval-e Ghureh-ye Mokhtar =

Jadval-e Ghureh-ye Mokhtar جدول غوره مختار
- Village
- Location within Iran
- Coordinates: 30°41′11″N 51°31′41″E
- Country: Iran
- Province: Kohgiluyeh and Boyer-Ahmad
- County: Boyer-Ahmad
- Bakhsh: Central
- Rural District: Sarrud-e Shomali

Population (2006)
  - Total: 307
- Time zone: UTC+3:30 (IRST)
  - Summer (DST): UTC+4:30 (IRDT)

Jadval-e Ghureh-ye Mokhtar (Persian: جدول غوره مختار, also Romanized as Jadval-e Ghūreh-ye Mokhtār; also known as Jadval-e Ghūreh-ye Pā’īn and Jadval-e Ghūreh-ye Soflá) is a village in Sarrud-e Shomali Rural District, in the Central District of Boyer-Ahmad County, Kohgiluyeh and Boyer-Ahmad Province, Iran. At the 2006 census, its population was 307, in 54 families.
