= Solikha Khusniddinova =

Uzbekistani footballer

Personal information
- Full name: Solikha Khusniddin qizi Khusniddinova
- Date of birth: 22 January 1998 (age 28)
- Place of birth: Kamashi, Uzbekistan
- Position: Defender

Senior career*
Years	Team	Apps	(Gls)
- Sevinch
2021–2022	Kocaeli Bayan FK	20	(0)

International career^{‡}
2016–2017	Uzbekistan U19	5	(0)
2019–	Uzbekistan	3	(0)
- * Club domestic league appearances and goals as of 22 May 2022 ‡ National team caps and goals as of 9 April 2019

Solikha Khusniddinova (Uzbek: Solixa Xusniddinova, born 22 January 1998) is an Uzbekistani footballer who plays as a defender for Turkish Women's Football Super League club Kocaeli Bayan FK and the Uzbekistan women's national team.

== Early life ==
She played football with boys at school as a child.

== Club career ==
By mid December 2021, Khusniddinova moved to Turkey, and joined the Turkish Women's Super League club Kocaeli Bayan FK. By mid July 2022, she returned home.

== International career ==
Khusniddinova capped for Uzbekistan at senior level during the 2020 AFC Women's Olympic Qualifying Tournament.

== Style of play ==
She has been described as "who gained a lot of fans with her beautiful technique, unrepeatable feints, master of taking the ball away from the opponent and not giving it to the opponent, strong character, recognized as "Bunyodkor" and a skilled left wing midfielder of the national team".

== Personal life ==
She is a native of Qashqadaryo Region, Uzbekistan.

== International goals ==
No.	Date	Venue	Opponent	Score	Result	Competition
1.	14 July 2022	Pamir Stadium, Dushanbe, Tajikistan	Turkmenistan	6–0	6–0	2022 CAFA Women's Championship

== See also ==
- List of Uzbekistan women's international footballers
