= Jadval-e Darta Mokhtar =

Jadval-e Darta Mokhtar جدول دارتامختار
- Village
- Location within Iran
- Coordinates: 30°41′49″N 51°46′38″E
- Country: Iran
- Province: Kohgiluyeh and Boyer-Ahmad
- County: Boyer-Ahmad
- Bakhsh: Central
- Rural District: Sarrud-e Jonubi

Population (2006)
  - Total: 39
- Time zone: UTC+3:30 (IRST)
  - Summer (DST): UTC+4:30 (IRDT)

Jadval-e Darta Mokhtar (Persian: جدول دارتامختار, also Romanized as Jadval-e Dārtā Mokhtār; also known as Jadval-e Now and Jadval Now) is a village in Sarrud-e Jonubi Rural District, in the Central District of Boyer-Ahmad County, Kohgiluyeh and Boyer-Ahmad Province, Iran. At the 2006 census, its population was 39, in 8 families.
