= Bianca Sandu =

Romanian footballer (born 1992)

Personal information
- Full name: Bianca-Marilena Sandu
- Date of birth: 22 April 1992 (age 34)
- Position: Defender

Senior career*
Years	Team	Apps	(Gls)
2008–2010	Târgoviște		
2010–2017	Târgu Mureș		
2017–2022	Diósgyőri	117	(50)
2022–2023	Carmen București	18	(3)

International career^{‡}
- Romania
- * Club domestic league appearances and goals as of 19:47, 30 August 2019 (UTC) ‡ National team caps and goals as of 19:47, 30 August 2019 (UTC)

Bianca Sandu (born 22 April 1992) is a Romanian footballer who plays as a defender and has appeared for the Romania women's national team.

== Career ==
Sandu has been capped for the Romania national team, appearing for the team during the 2019 FIFA Women's World Cup qualifying cycle.

== International goals ==
Scores and results list Romania's goal tally first.

No.	Date	Venue	Opponent	Score	Result	Competition
1.	27 February 2019	Gold City, Antalya, Turkey	Turkmenistan	6–0	13–0	2019 Turkish Women's Cup
