= Nasir Hosseini =

Iranian Twelver Shia Ayatollah (born 1967)

Ayatollah; Seyyed; Nasir Hosseini
- نصیر حسینی
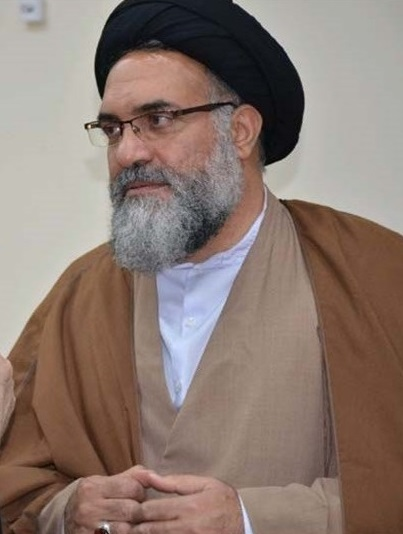
- Born: 1967 (age 58–59); Yasuj, Imperial State of Iran

Seyyed Nasir Hosseini (Persian: سید نصیر حسینی; born 1967, Yasuj) is an Iranian Twelver Shia cleric who is the representative of Guardianship of the Islamic Jurist in Kohgiluyeh and Boyer-Ahmad province and likewise the Imam of Friday Prayer in the city of Yasuj who has been recently appointed by the decree of Iran's former supreme leader, Seyyed Ali Khamenei at the mentioned position(s).

== Life ==
Seyyed Nasir Hosseini was born in 1967 in Yasuj (Kohgiluyeh and Boyer-Ahmad Province) in a religious Shia Persian family. He passed his elementary education in Yasuj, and went to the Hawzah of "Hazrat Wali-asr" in his city --in 1983. Later on, Hosseini went to Shiraz (to Hawzah AqaBabaKhan), and studied his religious education there; likewise, he taught there as a teacher. This Iranian Shia cleric, participated during Iran-Iraq War, and he is a Disabled Iranian veterans --as a result of attending in the mentioned war. He has also the record of being the Imam of Friday Prayer (for 10 years) in the city of Dehdasht.

== Teachers ==
Hosseini immigrated to Qom Seminary after the war; and passed his seminary lessons (at the lessons of Rasael, Makasib, Kharij-Fiqh and Osul [principles]); and had teachers among: Naser Makarem Shirazi, Mohammad-Taqi Bahjat, Hossein Waheed Khorasani, Abdollah Javadi-Amoli, Karimi Jahromi and Ostadi.

== See also ==
- Guardianship of the Islamic Jurist (Wilāyat al-Faqīh)
- Kohgiluyeh and Boyer-Ahmad (province)
- Yasuj (city)
