= Andrea Herczeg =

Romanian footballer (born 1994)

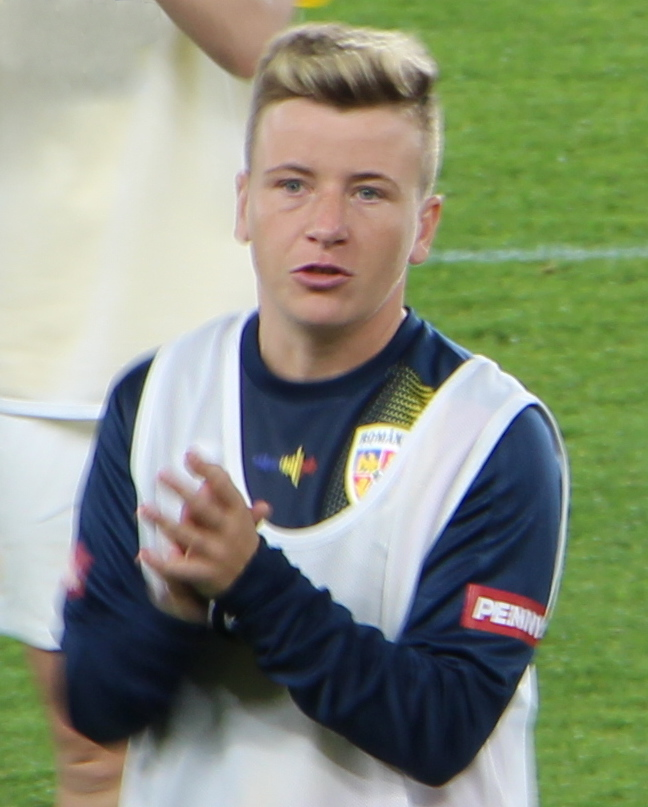

Personal information
- Date of birth: 13 September 1994 (age 32)
- Place of birth: Luduș, Romania
- Position: Midfielder

Team information
- Current team: Szent Mihály

Senior career*
Years	Team	Apps	(Gls)
2019–	Szent Mihály	12	(3)

International career^{‡}
- Romania
- * Club domestic league appearances and goals as of 19:47, 30 August 2019 (UTC) ‡ National team caps and goals as of 19:47, 30 August 2019 (UTC)

Andrea Herczeg (born 13 September 1994) is a Romanian footballer who plays as a midfielder for Szent Mihály FC and the Romania women's national team.

== Career ==
Herczeg has been capped for the Romania national team, appearing for the team during the 2019 FIFA Women's World Cup qualifying cycle.

== International goals ==
No.	Date	Venue	Opponent	Score	Result	Competition
1.	2 March 2018	Gold City, Antalya, Turkey	Northern Ireland	1–1	1–1	2018 Turkish Women's Cup
2.	27 February 2019	Gold City, Antalya, Turkey	Turkmenistan	1–0	13–0	2019 Turkish Women's Cup
3.	27 February 2019	Gold City, Antalya, Turkey	Turkmenistan	7–0	13–0	2019 Turkish Women's Cup
4.	27 February 2019	Gold City, Antalya, Turkey	Turkmenistan	10–0	13–0	2019 Turkish Women's Cup
5.	22 September 2020	Stadionul Mogoșoaia, Mogoșoaia, Romania	Croatia	3–1	4–1	UEFA Women's Euro 2022 qualifying
6.	28 June 2022	Centrul de Fotbal Buftea Teren 2, Buftea, Romania	Jordan	1–0	3–1	Friendly
7.	28 June 2022	Centrul de Fotbal Buftea Teren 2, Buftea, Romania	Jordan	2–0	3–1	Friendly
8.	5 April 2024	Armavir City Stadium, Armavir, Armenia	Armenia	5–0	5–0	UEFA Women's Euro 2025 qualifying
9.	4 June 2024	Stadion Aleksandar Shalamanov, Sofia, Bulgaria	Bulgaria	3–0	3–0	UEFA Women's Euro 2025 qualifying
