= Kamil Mingazow =

Turkmenistani footballer

Personal information
- Full name: Kamil Aleksandrowiç Mingazow
- Date of birth: June 21, 1968 (age 58)
- Place of birth: Mary, Turkmen SSR, Soviet Union (now Mary, Turkmenistan)
- Height: 1.70 m (5 ft 7 in)
- Position: Midfielder

Team information
- Current team: Turkmenistan Women's (head coach)

Senior career*
Years	Team	Apps	(Gls)
1987	Köpetdag Aşgabat	27	(1)
1988–1989	Bukovyna Chernivtsi	25	(1)
1989–1992	Köpetdag Aşgabat		
1993	Kolhozçy Türkmengala		
1994–1998	Köpetdag Aşgabat		
1999	Zhenis Astana	20	(0)
2000	Köpetdag Aşgabat		
2001	Shakhter Karagandy	16	(0)
2002–2006	Nisa Aşgabat		

International career^{‡}
1992–2004	Turkmenistan	46	(3)

Managerial career
- 2016−: Turkmenistan (women)
- * Club domestic league appearances and goals as of 17 December 2015 ‡ National team caps and goals as of 17 December 2015

Kamil Aleksandrowiç Mingazow (Tatar: Камил Александр улы Минһаҗев; born 21 June 1968) is a Turkmenistani football coach and former footballer. In Turkmenistan's opening match at the 1994 Asian Games versus China, Turkmenistan had only 11 players to choose from, as the other 9 members of their 20-man squad were delayed in Moscow due to visa problems. Mingazow (usually a midfielder) played as goalkeeper in a 2–2 draw.

Mingazow has also been the head coach of the Turkmenistan women's football team since 2016 and Turkmenistan women's national futsal team.

Kamil Mingazow represented the Turkmenistan from 1992 to 2004. He was capped 46 times for his country.

== Club career ==
In 1987 and 1989–1991, he played for Kopetdag. During the 1988–1989 period, he represented Bukovyna. With the team, he achieved first place in the 6th (Ukrainian) zone of the Soviet Second League.

Between 1992 and 1999, in the independent Turkmenistan Football Championship, he played for Kopetdag and Nisa. He is a seven-time champion of Turkmenistan and a six-time Turkmenistan Cup winner.

== International career ==
He also played for the Turkmenistan national football team from 1992 to 2005, participating in multiple qualifiers for the FIFA World Cup and 2004 AFC Asian Cup.

For the Turkmenistan national team, he played in all positions during his career: forward, midfielder, defender, and even as a goalkeeper. Notably, at the 1994 Asian Games in Japan, he played as a goalkeeper in a match against PR China, which ended in a 2–2 draw.

== Managerial career ==
He began his coaching career in May 2006 as head coach of FC Nisa.

Together with his former Kopetdag teammate, Tofik Şükürow, he served as the head coach of the Kopetdag women's team.

He also worked as an assistant coach for the Ashgabat-based FC Talyp Sporty.

Since 2019, he has simultaneously managed both the women's national football team and the women's national futsal team of Turkmenistan.

In 2020, he coached the Ashgabat women's futsal club.

== Personal life ==
Mingazow is an ethnic Tatar. His wife is Ekaterina (born in 1969). They have three children: Albina (born in 1988), Kamila Mingazowa (born in 2005), and son Ruslan Mingazow (born in 1991).

His son Ruslan is a Turkmenistani international footballer who currently plays for Kitchee.

His younger daughter, Kamila Mingazowa, is also a professional footballer and futsal player.

== Statistics ==
Season	Club	League	Championship	
Season	Club	League	Matches	Goals
1987	Kopetdag	Soviet Second League	27	1
1988	FSC Bukovyna Chernivtsi	Soviet Second League	22	1
1989	FSC Bukovyna Chernivtsi	Soviet Second League	3	0
1989	Kopetdag	Soviet Second League	7	1
1990	Kopetdag	Soviet Second League	34	2
1991	Kopetdag	Soviet Second League	41	5
1992	Kopetdag	Turkmenistan Higher League	?	?
1993	Kopetdag	Turkmenistan Higher League	?	16
1994	Kopetdag	Turkmenistan Higher League	?	?
1995	Kopetdag	Turkmenistan Higher League	?	?
1996	Kopetdag	Turkmenistan Higher League	?	?
1997/98	Kopetdag	Turkmenistan Higher League	?	?
1998/99	Kopetdag	Turkmenistan Higher League	?	?
1999	FC Zhenis	Kazakhstan Premier League	20	0
2000	Nisa	Turkmenistan Higher League	?	?
2001	FC Shakhter Karagandy	Kazakhstan Premier League	16	0
2002	Kopetdag	Turkmenistan Higher League	?	0
2002	Nisa	Turkmenistan Higher League	?	1
2003	Nisa	Turkmenistan Higher League	?	?
2004	Nisa	Turkmenistan Higher League	?	?
2005	Nisa	Turkmenistan Higher League	?	?
2006	Nisa	Turkmenistan Higher League	?	?

== Achievements ==
- Seven-time Champion of Turkmenistan as a player with Kopetdag (1992–1995, 1998).
- Six-time winner of the Turkmenistan Cup (1993, 2000, scoring a goal in the final).
