= Kamila Zaripova =

Uzbekistani footballer

Personal information
- Full name: Kamila Mamurjanovna Zaripova
- Date of birth: 19 November 1998 (age 27)
- Place of birth: Olmaliq, Uzbekistan
- Position: Midfielder

Senior career*
Years	Team	Apps	(Gls)
- AGMK Olmaliq
2021–2022	Trabzonspor	20	(0)

International career^{‡}
2017–	Uzbekistan	4	(0)
- * Club domestic league appearances and goals as of 8 May 2022 ‡ National team caps and goals as of 9 April 2019

Kamila Zaripova (born 19 November 1998) is an Uzbekistani footballer who plays as a midfielder for Trabzonspor in Turkey, and the Uzbekistan women's national team.

== Club career ==
In 2021, she moved to Turkey and signed with the re-established team Trabzonspor to play in the Turkish Women's Football Super League. By late July 2022, she returned home.

== International career ==
Zaripova capped for Uzbekistan at senior level during the 2018 AFC Women's Asian Cup qualification and the 2020 AFC Women's Olympic Qualifying Tournament. On 14 July 2022, she scored her first international goals against Turkmenistan in 2022 CAFA Women's Championship in Dushanbe.

== International goals ==
Scores and results list Uzbekistan's goal tally first.

No.	Date	Venue	Opponent	Score	Result	Competition
1.	14 July 2022	Pamir Stadium, Dushanbe, Tajikistan	Turkmenistan	5–0	6–0	2022 CAFA Women's Championship
2.	28 March 2023	Pakhtakor Stadium, Tashkent, Uzbekistan	India	3–2	3–2	Friendly

== See also ==
- List of Uzbekistan women's international footballers
