= Brigitta Gődér =

Romanian footballer (born 1992)

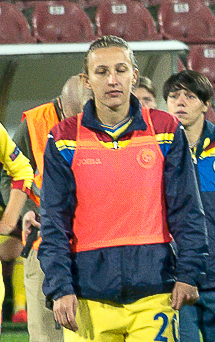

Personal information
- Date of birth: 6 May 1992 (age 34)
- Place of birth: Marghita, Romania
- Position: Midfielder

Team information
- Current team: Győri ETO FC

Senior career*
Years	Team	Apps	(Gls)
- Motorul Oradea
- ASA Târgu Mureș
2016–2020	Győri ETO FC		
2020–	Haladás-Viktória		

International career^{‡}
- Romania
- * Club domestic league appearances and goals as of 19:47, 30 August 2019 (UTC) ‡ National team caps and goals as of 19:47, 30 August 2019 (UTC)

Brigitta Gődér, sometimes written as Brigita Goder (born 6 May 1992 in Marghita) is a Romanian footballer of Hungarian ethnicity who plays as a midfielder for Haladás-Viktória and has appeared for the Romania women's national team.

== Career ==
Gődér has been capped for the Romania national team, appearing during the 2019 FIFA Women's World Cup qualifying cycle.

== International goals ==
Scores and results list Romania's goal tally first.

No.	Date	Venue	Opponent	Score	Result	Competition
1.	27 February 2019	Gold City, Antalya, Turkey	Turkmenistan	3–0	13–0	2019 Turkish Women's Cup
2.	24 June 2022	Zimbru Stadium, Chișinău, Moldova	Moldova	3–0	4–0	2023 FIFA Women's World Cup qualification
3.	5 April 2024	Armavir City Stadium, Armavir, Armenia	Armenia	1–0	5–0	UEFA Women's Euro 2025 qualifying
