= Yasuj University of Medical Sciences =

State university in Iran

- Type: Public
- Established: 1990
- President: Saeed Javdansirat
- Academic staff: Approximately 177
- Students: Approximately 2000
- Location: Yasuj, Iran
- Campus: Urban
- Language: Persian
- Website: http://en.yums.ac.ir
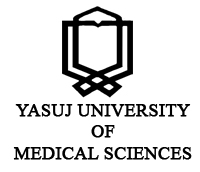

Yasuj University of Medical Sciences (YUMS) (Persian: دانشگاه علوم پزشکی یاسوج, Daneshgah-e Olum-e Pezeshki-ye Yasuj) is a state university in Iran under the supervision of the Ministry of Health and Medical Education in Kohgiluyeh and Boyer-Ahmad province, Iran.

The University has about 177 faculty members and approximately 2,000 students. The University accepts students in medicine, dentistry, paramedical, nursing, midwifery, Nutrition Sciences, and healthcare majors, at undergraduate and graduate levels. Admissions are decided by scores earned on an annual national examination.

== History ==
The establishment of Yasuj University of Medical Sciences (YUMS) as a college in 1990 was aimed at transforming it into a regional center for treatment in Kohgiluyeh and Boyer Ahmad. In 1995, it began accepting medical students through the national entrance test. Following three years as an Institute, the organization was elevated to Yasuj University of Medical Sciences in September 1995.

== Campus ==
The School of Public Health, the New University Campus, and the University Management Complex make up the campus.

== Schools ==
1. School of Medicine
2. School of Dentistry
3. School of Nursing and Midwifery
4. School of Health
5. School of Paramedicine

== Research centers ==
=== Medicinal Plant Research Center ===
The Medicinal Plant Research Center was the University's first Research Center and was approved in 2007. Dena peaks in the South zone is located in the Dena district. The Boyer Ahmad district is considered a natural museum of medicinal plants. Diversity in this region is unparalleled and Iran's unique genetic resources help support this center. The center examines the advantages, disadvantages, and properties of medicinal plants for the treatment and preparation of cosmetics and health.

=== Social Determinants of Health Research Center ===
In February 2011, the Department of Health launched the Social Determinants of Health Research Centre. Its goal is to look at how fundamental necessities and health are influenced by society.

=== Molecular Cellular Research Center ===
Scholarly research is conducted at the Cellular-Molecular Research Centre. The centre was founded in 2010 and provides a framework for graduate student and professor research initiatives in medicine and other disciplines.

== Provincial Health Networks ==
1. Dena Health Network

2. Bahmaee Health Network

3. Boyer-Ahmad Health Network

4. Kohgiluyeh Health Network

5. Gachsaran Health Network

6. Basht Health Network

7. Choram Health Network

== Official Website ==
English Website

Persian Website (فارسی)
