= Malika Burkhonova =

Uzbekistani footballer

Personal information
- Full name: Malika Khusniddin qizi Burkhonova
- Date of birth: 22 February 1999 (age 27)
- Place of birth: Qarshi, Uzbekistan
- Position: Midfielder

Team information
- Current team: Sevinch

Senior career*
Years	Team	Apps	(Gls)
- Sevinch

International career^{‡}
2016–2017	Uzbekistan U19	6	(1)
2017–	Uzbekistan	6+	(1)
2018	Uzbekistan (futsal)	1+	(1)
- * Club domestic league appearances and goals ‡ National team caps and goals as of 9 April 2019

Malika Burkhonova (Uzbek: Malika Burxonova; born 22 February 1999) is an Uzbekistani footballer who plays as a midfielder for Women's Championship club Sevinch and the Uzbekistan women's national team.

== International career ==
Burkhonova capped for Uzbekistan at senior level during the 2018 AFC Women's Asian Cup qualification and the 2020 AFC Women's Olympic Qualifying Tournament.

=== International goals ===
Scores and results list Uzbekistan's goal tally first

No.	Date	Venue	Opponent	Score	Result	Competition
1.	23 November 2018	Milliy Stadium, Tashkent, Uzbekistan	Afghanistan	8–0	20–0	2018 CAFA Women's Championship
2.	27 February 2019	Evrenseki Stadium, Side, Turkey	India	1–0	1–0	2019 Turkish Women's Cup
3.	3 March 2019	Evrenseki Stadium, Side, Turkey	Turkmenistan	6–0	11–1	2019 Turkish Women's Cup
4.	11 June 2021	ABFF Stadium, Minsk, Belarus	Iran	3–0	5–0	Friendly

== See also ==
- List of Uzbekistan women's international footballers
