= Chenarestan, Lorestan =

Chenarestan چنارستان
- Village
- Location within Iran
- Coordinates: 33°50′18″N 48°42′47″E
- Country: Iran
- Province: Lorestan
- County: Borujerd
- Bakhsh: Central
- Rural District: Hemmatabad

Population (2006)
  - Total: 684
- Time zone: UTC+3:30 (IRST)
  - Summer (DST): UTC+4:30 (IRDT)

Chenarestan (Persian: چنارستان, also Romanized as Chenārestān; also known as Chenār Sū (Persian: چِنار سو) and Chinār Su) is a village in Hemmatabad Rural District, in the Central District of Borujerd County, Lorestan Province, Iran. At the 2006 census, its population was 684, in 169 families.
