= Madavan, Iran =

Neighborhood in Kohgiluyeh and Boyer-Ahmad province, Iran

Madavan Persian: مادوان
- Neighborhood
- Location within Iran
- Coordinates: 30°43′21″N 51°32′41″E
- Country: Iran
- Province: Kohgiluyeh and Boyer-Ahmad
- County: Boyer-Ahmad
- District: Central
- City: Yasuj

Population (2016)
  - Total: 18,078
- Time zone: UTC+3:30 (IRST)

Madavan (Persian: مادوان) (Note: Formerly Madavan-e Olya (مادوان عليا), also romanized as Mādavān-e ‘Olyā; also known as Mādavān-e Bālā) is a neighborhood in the city of Yasuj of the Central District of Boyer-Ahmad County, Kohgiluyeh and Boyer-Ahmad province, Iran. As the village of Madavan-e Olya, it was the capital of Sarrud-e Shomali Rural District until its capital was transferred to the village of Gusheh-ye Shahzadeh Qasem.

== Demographics ==
=== Population ===
At the time of the 2006 National Census, the population was 7,109 in 1,403 households, when it was the village of Madavan-e Olya in Sarrud-e Shomali Rural District. The following census in 2011 counted 10,777 people in 2,428 households, by which time the village had been elevated to city status as Madavan. The 2016 census measured the population of the city as 18,078 people in 4,219 households.

After the census, Madavan, and the villages of Balahzar, Jadval-e Ghureh-ye Mehrian, Madavan-e Sofla, Mehrian, Sarab-e Taveh, Servak, and Tall Khosrow, were merged with the city of Yasuj.
