= Lindsey Thomas =

French footballer (born 1995)

Personal information
- Full name: Lindsey Kimberley Thomas
- Date of birth: 27 April 1995 (age 31)
- Place of birth: Saint-Claude, Guadeloupe, France
- Height: 1.71 m (5 ft 7 in)
- Position: Forward

Team information
- Current team: Monterrey
- Number: 19

Youth career
- 2004–2010: AJS Santoise
- 2010–2011: EJS Blanquefortaise
- 2011–2014: Montpellier

Senior career*
Years	Team	Apps	(Gls)
2012–2019	Montpellier	32	(17)
2015–2016	→ Basel (loan)	25	(12)
2017–2018	→ Bordeaux (loan)	12	(0)
2018–2019	→ Dijon (loan)	22	(4)
2019–2021	Roma	38	(11)
2021–2023	AC Milan	47	(15)
2023–2026	Juventus	59	(4)
2026–	Monterrey	0	(0)

International career
2013	France U19	5	(1)
2014	France U20	3	(0)
2017–2019	France U23	17	(9)
2022–2023	France	6	(0)
Medal record
Women's football
Representing France
FIFA U-20 Women's World Cup
Third place	2014 Canada
UEFA Women's Under-19 Championship
Winner	2013 Wales
- * Club domestic league appearances and goals as of 25 April 2025

Lindsey Kimberley Thomas (born 27 April 1995) is a French professional footballer who plays as a forward for Liga MX Femenil Club de Futbol Monterrey Femenil.

== Club career ==
Thomas grew up with her grand-mother in Guadeloupe, where she began her youth career with the Association de la Jeunesse Sportive (AJS) Santoise Football Club. She would play in inter-gender training matches there as the only female member of the club among 14 other male teammates, until she moved to France to join EJS Blanquefortaise in 2010.

After finishing her youth career by graduating from the Montpellier academy, Thomas played senior football with Montpellier for five years, which was briefly interrupted by a season-long loan to Swiss team Basel in the 2015–16 season. By the time she moved on loan to Bordeaux in November 2017, she was beginning to play as a striker. In July 2018, she joined Dijon on a season long loan deal.

In the summer of 2019, Thomas moved to Italy and signed with Roma. In her first season with the club, she played most games among all outfield players in the league while providing most number of assists and finishing as club's topscorer. During her second season, she helped the team to win 2020–21 Coppa Italia title, the first ever major trophy won by the team in their history.

Despite her major success with Roma, Thomas announced her departure from the club on 9 July 2021 and cited her desire for "a new adventure" as her reason for leaving the club. On 14 July 2021, it was officially confirmed that Thomas joined AC Milan on a two-year deal until June 2023.

On 10 June 2023, Thomas joined Juventus. On 27 September 2025, she scored the winning goal in the 92nd minute of a 3–2 victory over AS Roma in the final of the inaugural Serie A Women’s Cup.

== International career ==
Thomas is a former French youth international. On 8 October 2022, she made her senior team debut for France in a 2–1 defeat against Germany.

== Style of play ==
Thomas is a versatile forward with the awareness and tactical intelligence to string together the build-up play around the opponent's penalty area and help her teammates into easier chances on goal. In addition to her abilities in the build-up phase, she can use her strength and ability to shield the ball for effective hold-up play. She can also use her pace and finishing to create and score on fast-break counter attacks for her team. Her versatility has led to Thomas being played in all possible forward positions at club level.

== Career statistics ==
=== International ===
As of match played 21 February 2023

Appearances and goals by national team and year
National team	Year	Apps	Goals
France
France	2022	3	0
France	2023	3	0
Total		6	0

== Honours ==
Roma

- Coppa Italia: 2020–21

France U19

- UEFA Women's Under-19 Championship: 2013

France U20

- FIFA U-20 Women's World Cup third place: 2014
