= Jadval-e Torki =

Jadval-e Torki جدول تركي
- Village
- Location within Iran
- Coordinates: 29°16′11″N 51°54′25″E
- Country: Iran
- Province: Fars
- County: Kazerun
- Bakhsh: Jereh and Baladeh
- Rural District: Jereh

Population (2006)
  - Total: 1,471
- Time zone: UTC+3:30 (IRST)
  - Summer (DST): UTC+4:30 (IRDT)

Jadval-e Torki (Persian: جدول تركي, also Romanized as Jadval-e Torkī and Jadval Torkī; also known as Joturki and Jūtorkī) is a village in Jereh Rural District, Jereh and Baladeh District, Kazerun County, Fars province, Iran. At the 2006 census, its population was 1,471, in 311 families.
