= Inès Jaurena =

French footballer (born 1991)

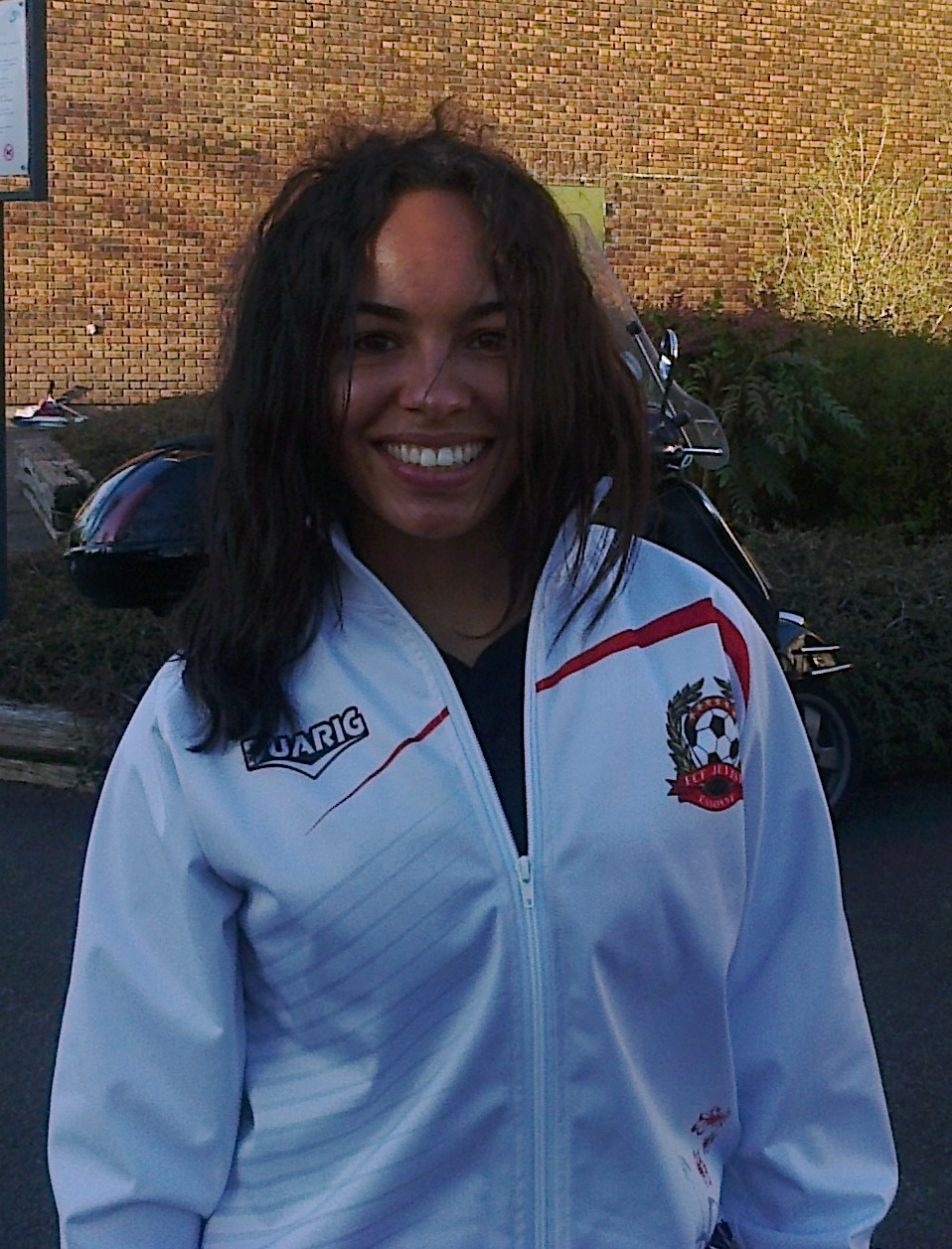
- Jaurena in 2014

Personal information
- Full name: Inès Jaurena
- Date of birth: 14 May 1991 (age 35)
- Place of birth: Paris, France
- Height: 1.60 m (5 ft 3 in)
- Position: Midfielder

Youth career
- 1999–2005: CA Paris-Charenton
- 2005–2006: Saint-Maur

College career
Years	Team	Apps	(Gls)
2009–2012	Florida State Seminoles	96	(12)

Senior career*
Years	Team	Apps	(Gls)
2006–2009	Saint-Maur	44	(8)
2013	Issy	9	(1)
2013–2019	Paris FC (Note: Known until the 2016–17 season as Juvisy.)	106	(6)
2019–2022	Bordeaux	55	(3)
2022–2023	Lyon	4	(0)
2023	Washington Spirit	13	(0)
2024–2026	Fleury	49	(0)
Total		280	(18)

International career
2007–2008	France U17	17	(1)
2009–2010	France U19	15	(0)
2010	France U20	4	(0)
2015–2019	France U23	16	(2)
2017–2021	France	4	(0)
- * Club domestic league appearances and goals as of 05:15, 13 June 2026 (UTC)

Inès Jaurena (born 14 May 1991) is a French former professional footballer who played as a midfielder.

== Club career ==
=== Issy ===
In January 2013, Jaurena joined Issy. She made her league debut against Saint-Étienne on 20 January 2013. Jaurena scored her first league goal against Arras on 14 April 2013, scoring in the 81st minute.

Jaurena made her league debut against Rodez on 6 October 2013. She scored her first league goal against Rodez on 2 February 2014, scoring in the 45th minute.

On 15 April 2021, Jaurena extended her contract with Bordeaux until the end of the 2022/23 season. In December 2021, Jaurena became a consultant for Eurosport for the Coupe de France.

On 18 July 2022, Lyon announced the signing of Jaurena on a one-year deal until June 2023. Jaurena left Lyon on 29 January 2023 after her contract was ended by mutual agreement.

Jaurena signed with Washington Spirit in February 2023. She was waived on 20 November 2023.

On January 3, 2024, Jaurena signed a contract with FC Fleury 91, lasting until June 2025. She made her league debut against Dijon on 10 January 2024.

== International career ==
Jaurena was part of the France squad for the 2010 UEFA Women's Under-19 Championship. She played in the final as France beat England U19s 2–1. Jaurena was part of the France squad for the 2010 FIFA U-20 Women's World Cup.

Jaurena made her senior team debut on 20 October 2017 in a 1–0 friendly win against England.

== Career statistics ==
=== International ===
As of match played 13 April 2021

Appearances and goals by national team and year
National team	Year	Apps	Goals
France	2017	2	0
France	2018	0	0
France	2019	0	0
France	2020	0	0
France	2021	2	0
Total		4	0
