= 2022 CAFA Women's Championship =

Tournament details
- Host country: Tajikistan
- City: Dushanbe
- Dates: 8–20 July
- Teams: 5 (from 1 sub-confederation)
- Venue: (in 1 host city)

Final positions
- Champions: Uzbekistan (2nd title)
- Runners-up: Iran
- Third place: Kyrgyzstan
- Fourth place: Turkmenistan

Tournament statistics
- Matches played: 10
- Goals scored: 33 (3.3 per match)
- Attendance: 1,488 (149 per match)
- Top scorer(s): (Uzbekistan) Nilufar Kudratova (5 goals)
- Best player: (Uzbekistan) Nilufar Kudratova
- Fair play award: Iran

The 2022 CAFA Women's Championship was the second edition of the CAFA Women's Championship, the quadrennial international women's football championship organised by the Central Asian Football Association for the women's senior national teams of Central Asia. The tournament was hosted by Tajikistan.

Uzbekistan were the defending champions, having won their first title in 2018. They managed to retain the title undefeated. Hosts Tajikistan finished in last place after losing three matches and drawing one against debutants Turkmenistan, who secured fourth place just one point ahead of their Tajik counterparts.

== Participation ==
=== Participating teams ===
A total of 5 (out of 6) CAFA nations entered the final tournament. with Turkmenistan debuting in the tournament. Meanwhile, Afghanistan did not participate, as the team was disbanded following the Taliban takeover.

Team	App.	Previous best performance	FIFA ranking June 2022
Iran	2nd	Runners-up (2018)	70
Kyrgyzstan	2nd	Fourth place (2018)	125
Tajikistan	2nd	Third Place (2018)	139
Turkmenistan	1st	—N/a	NR
Uzbekistan	2nd	Champions (2018)	46

Did not enter

- Afghanistan

=== Squads ===
Each national team had to submit a squad of 23 players.

== Venues ==
On 3 July 2022, Republic Central Stadium was confirmed as the sole venue of the tournament.

Dushanbe	2022 CAFA Women's Championship (Tajikistan)
Republic Central Stadium	2022 CAFA Women's Championship (Tajikistan)
Capacity: 20,000	2022 CAFA Women's Championship (Tajikistan)

== Officials ==
CAFA selected the following match officials to officiate the tournament:

=== Referees ===
- (Iran) Mahsa Ghorbani
- (Kyrgyzstan) Malika Kadyrova
- (Tajikistan) Nodira Mirzoeva
- (Turkmenistan) Resul Mämmedow
- (Uzbekistan) Anna Sidorova

=== Assistant Referees ===
- (Iran) Ensieh Khabaz
- (Kyrgyzstan) Ramina Tsoi
- (Tajikistan) Dilshoda Rahmonova
- (Turkmenistan) Akmyrat Gurbanow
- (Uzbekistan) Kristina Sereda

== Main tournament ==
The official match schedule was confirmed by CAFA on 3 July 2022.

Tiebreakers

Ranking in each group shall be determined as follows:

1. Greater number of points obtained in all the group matches;
2. Goal difference in all the group matches;
3. Greater number of goals scored in all the group matches;
4. Greater disciplinary points.

If two or more teams are equal on the basis on the above four criteria, the place shall be determined as follows:

1. Result of the direct match between the teams concerned;
2. Penalty shoot-out if only the teams are tied, and they met in the last round of the group;
3. Drawing lots by the Organising Committee.

All times listed are Tajikistan Time (UTC+05:00)

=== Tournament table ===
Pos	Team	Pld	W	D	L	GF	GA	GD	Pts	Final result
1	Uzbekistan	4	4	0	0	20	0	+20	12	Champions
2	Iran	4	3	0	1	10	1	+9	9	Runners-up
3	Kyrgyzstan	4	1	1	2	1	8	−7	4	Third place
4	Turkmenistan	4	0	2	2	1	11	−10	2	
5	Tajikistan (H)	4	0	1	3	1	13	−12	1	

Source: CAFA
Rules for classification: Group stage tiebreakers
(H) Hosts
8 July 2022
19:00

Kyrgyzstan	0–1	Iran
	Report (AFC); Report (CAFA)	Behesht 52'

Republic Central Stadium, Dushanbe
Attendance: 52
Referee: Anna Sidorova (Uzbekistan)
8 July 2022
22:00

Turkmenistan	1–1	Tajikistan
Prýannikowa 65'	Report (AFC); Report (CAFA)	Mirzoeva 7'

Republic Central Stadium, Dushanbe
Attendance: 97
Referee: Malika Kadyrova (Kyrgyzstan)

11 July 2022
19:00

Turkmenistan	0–0	Kyrgyzstan
	Report (AFC); Report (CAFA)

Republic Central Stadium, Dushanbe
Attendance: 67
Referee: Mahsa Ghorbani (Iran)
11 July 2022
22:00

Tajikistan	0–6	Uzbekistan
	Report (AFC); Report (CAFA)	Ablyakimova 8', 25'; Kudratova 10', 34', 41'; Mamatkarimova 64'

Republic Central Stadium, Dushanbe
Attendance: 150
Referee: Resul Mammedov (Turkmenistan)

14 July 2022
19:00

Uzbekistan	6–0	Turkmenistan
Zaynitdinova 6'; Mamatkarimova 50', 58'; Norboeva 64'; Zaripova 79'; Khusniddinova 90+2'	Report (AFC); Report (CAFA)

Republic Central Stadium, Dushanbe
Attendance: 87
Referee: Nodira Mirzoeva (Tajikistan)
14 July 2022
22:00

Iran	5–0	Tajikistan
Chatrenoor 2', 87'; Foroozandeh 31', 69'; Motevallitaher 38'	Report (AFC); Report (CAFA)

Republic Central Stadium, Dushanbe
Attendance: 135
Referee: Resul Mammedov (Turkmenistan)

17 July 2022
19:00

Iran	4–0	Turkmenistan
Foroozandeh 4'; Motevallitaher 28'; Chatrenoor 69'; Zolfi 74'	Report (AFC); Report (CAFA)

Republic Central Stadium, Dushanbe
Attendance: 100
Referee: Nodira Mirzoeva (Tajikistan)
17 July 2022
22:00

Kyrgyzstan	0–7	Uzbekistan
	Report (AFC); Report (CAFA)	Kudratova 6', 39'; Irisboeva 10', 56'; Khikmatova 45+1'; Khabibullaeva 78'; Mamatkarimova 81'

Republic Central Stadium, Dushanbe
Attendance: 100
Referee: Mahsa Ghorbani (Iran)

20 July 2022
19:00

Uzbekistan	1–0	Iran
Shoyimova 86'	Report (AFC); Report (CAFA)

Republic Central Stadium, Dushanbe
Attendance: 200
Referee: Malika Kadyrova (Kyrgyzstan)
20 July 2022
22:00

Tajikistan	0–1	Kyrgyzstan
	Report (AFC); Report (CAFA)	Karataeva 20'

Republic Central Stadium, Dushanbe
Attendance: 500
Referee: Anna Sidorova (Uzbekistan)

== Goalscorers ==
There were 33 goals scored in 10 matches, for an average of 3.3 goals per match.

5 goals

- (Uzbekistan) Nilufar Kudratova

4 goals

- (Uzbekistan) Zarina Mamatkarimova

3 goals

- (Iran) Afsaneh Chatrenoor
- (Iran) Hasti Foroozandeh

2 goals

- (Iran) Melika Motevallitaher
- (Uzbekistan) Ilvina Ablyakimova
- (Uzbekistan) Ziyoda Irisboeva

1 goal

- (Iran) Shabnam Behesht
- (Iran) Mohadeeseh Zolfi
- (Kyrgyzstan) Aiana Karataeva
- (Tajikistan) Munisa Mirzoeva
- (Turkmenistan) Swetlana Prýannikowa
- (Uzbekistan) Diyorakhon Khabibullaeva
- (Uzbekistan) Madina Khikmatova
- (Uzbekistan) Solikha Khusniddinova
- (Uzbekistan) Aziza Norboeva
- (Uzbekistan) Maftuna Shoyimova
- (Uzbekistan) Kamila Zaripova
- (Uzbekistan) Shakhrizoda Zaynitdinova

Source: CAFA

=== Discipline ===
In the final tournament, a player was suspended for the subsequent match in the competition for either getting red card or accumulating two yellow cards in two different matches.

Player	Offences	Suspensions
(Tajikistan) Niso Abdulloeva	(yellow card) v Uzbekistan (matchday 2; 11 July); (yellow card) v Iran (matchday 3; 14 July)	v Kyrgyz Republic (matchday 4; 20 July)

== Awards ==
The following awards were given at the conclusion of the tournament:

=== Most Valuable Player ===
The Most Valuable Player of the Tournament award was given to Nilufar Kudratova.

- (Uzbekistan) Nilufar Kudratova

=== Top Scorer ===
The top scorer award was given to the top scorer in the tournament. Nilufar Kudratova won the award with seven goals scored in the tournament.

- (Uzbekistan) Nilufar Kudratova

=== Fairplay Award ===
The Fairplay Award was given to the Iran women's national football team.

- Iran

=== Special Award ===
the Special Award was given to the Turkmenistan women's national football team after they finished fourth overall.

- Turkmenistan

== See also ==
- 2022 AFC Women's Asian Cup
- 2022 AFF Women's Championship
- 2022 EAFF E-1 Football Championship (women)
- 2022 SAFF Women's Championship
- 2022 WAFF Women's Championship
