= Jadval-e Now, Fars =

Jadval-e Now جدول نو
- Village
- Location within Iran
- Coordinates: 30°29′05″N 52°29′02″E
- Country: Iran
- Province: Fars
- County: Eqlid
- Bakhsh: Sedeh
- Rural District: Dezhkord

Population (2006)
  - Total: 129
- Time zone: UTC+3:30 (IRST)
  - Summer (DST): UTC+4:30 (IRDT)

Jadval-e Now (Persian: جدول نو) is a village in Dezhkord Rural District, Sedeh District, Eqlid County, Fars province, Iran. At the 2006 census, its population was 129, in 32 families.
