= Dehdasht =

City in Kohgiluyeh and Boyer-Ahmad province, Iran

Dehdasht Persian: دهدشت
- City
- Location within Iran
- Coordinates: 30°47′47″N 50°33′57″E
- Country: Iran
- Province: Kohgiluyeh and Boyer-Ahmad
- County: Kohgiluyeh
- District: Central

Population (2016)
  - Total: 57,036
- Time zone: UTC+3:30 (IRST)

Dehdasht (Persian: دهدشت) (Note: Also known as Dehdast and Kuhgiluyeh) is a city in the Central District of Kohgiluyeh County, Kohgiluyeh and Boyer-Ahmad province, Iran, serving as capital of both the county and the district.

== Etymology ==
The name "Dehdasht" (Persian: دهدشت) is derived from two Persian words: ده (deh), meaning "village," and دشت (dasht), meaning "plain" or "field." The term deh has its roots in Old Persian, where it referred to a rural settlement or village, while dasht denotes an expanse of land suitable for agriculture. This combination reflects the geographical and cultural significance of the area as a village situated in a fertile plain, highlighting its agricultural heritage.The word deh itself has evolved through various stages of the Persian language, originating from Middle Persian dahigān, which referred to farmers or villagers, and is related to the broader concept of rural life in Iran. The suffix -dasht is commonly used in Persian to describe flat lands or fields, indicating the agricultural character of the region surrounding Dehdasht.

== History ==
Dehdasht is a historically significant city in southwestern Iran, particularly prominent during the Islamic era. It achieved considerable importance and prosperity during the Safavid period (1501-1736), serving as the "Dar al-Molk" (center of government) and capital of the large province of Kohgiluyeh, which encompassed the extensive Arrajan region. Dehdasht was a vital center from the Sasanian period (224-651) onward, known then as Beladshapur and later as Kohgiluyeh. The city once featured urban infrastructure including defensive walls, a government citadel, a bazaar, a caravanserai, a mosque, large bathhouses, schools, and over a thousand residential buildings. There are several Imamzadeh shrines within the city, such as Imamzadeh Masum, Imamzadeh Panjeh Khal, and Imamzadeh Seyyed Mohammad.

However, Dehdasht experienced a decline from the Safavid era through the end of the Qajar period (1789-1925). This decline was attributed to war and riots, successive looting, insecurity, the destruction of communication networks, decreased business prosperity, heavy taxation, and a deteriorating economic situation, leading to the city being abandoned by its inhabitants. The weakening of Dehdasht began with the decline of the Safavid government and continued into the Qajar period. The final collapse and end of its political and social life occurred in the late Qajar period.

=== February 2025 protests ===
In February 2025, Dehdasht experienced significant anti-government protests amidst widespread dissatisfaction with deteriorating economic conditions across Iran. Beginning on February 8, protests erupted in response to ongoing power shortages and sharp increases in food prices, coinciding with the anniversary of the 1979 Iranian Revolution. Demonstrators gathered in the city, chanting slogans such as "Death to the dictator" and "This year is the year of blood, Khamenei will be overthrown," expressing their grievances against the Supreme Leader and the Islamic Republic. Government-affiliated media attempted to downplay the unrest, framing it as tribal conflicts rather than a broader expression of economic discontent. However, videos shared on social media indicated that the protests were primarily focused on economic issues rather than ethnic tensions. In response to the demonstrations, authorities deployed special security forces to Dehdasht and arrested at least ten protesters, including women, throughout the course of the unrest.

Authorities detaining at least six protesters, including two women, on February 12. Those arrested included Atefeh Tahernia, Jaber Foroughi, Kamran Bouzari, Amirhossein Jafari, and Pouria Barati.

The protests in Dehdasht were part of a larger wave of demonstrations occurring in multiple cities across Iran, where citizens voiced similar frustrations over economic hardships and government policies. Reports indicated that protesters urged neighboring regions to join them in their calls for change, emphasizing that "silence in the face of oppression is betrayal."

=== 2026 Iran War ===
On April 5, 2026, American forces launched strikes in the city in response to the downing of an American aircraft, resulting in the deaths of at least four people, with one wounded.

== Demographics ==
=== Population ===
At the time of the 2006 National Census, the city's population was 49,995 in 9,628 households. The following census in 2011 counted 56,279 people in 12,462 households. The 2016 census measured the population of the city as 57,036 people in 14,009 households.

== See also ==
- Seyyed Nasir Hosseini (the Imam of Friday Prayer)
