= Karimabad-e Jadval-e Now =

Karimabad-e Jadval-e Now كريم ابادجدول نو
- Village
- Location within Iran
- Coordinates: 29°39′58″N 52°07′36″E
- Country: Iran
- Province: Fars
- County: Shiraz
- Bakhsh: Central
- Rural District: Derak

Population (2006)
  - Total: 49
- Time zone: UTC+3:30 (IRST)
  - Summer (DST): UTC+4:30 (IRDT)

Karimabad-e Jadval-e Now (Persian: كريم ابادجدول نو, also Romanized as Karīmābād-e Jadval-e Now; also known as Jadval-e Now and Qal‘eh-i-Nau) is a village in Derak Rural District, in the Central District of Shiraz County, Fars province, Iran. At the 2006 census, its population was 49, in 11 families.
