= Sarrud-e Shomali Rural District =

Rural district in Kohgiluyeh and Boyer-Ahmad province, Iran

Sarrud-e Shomali Rural District Persian: دهستان سررود شمالي
- Rural District
- Location within Iran
- Coordinates: 30°42′24″N 51°34′25″E
- Country: Iran
- Province: Kohgiluyeh and Boyer-Ahmad
- County: Boyer-Ahmad
- District: Central
- Capital: Gusheh-ye Shahzadeh Qasem

Population (2016)
  - Total: 34,140
- Time zone: UTC+3:30 (IRST)

Sarrud-e Shomali Rural District (Persian: دهستان سررود شمالي) is in the Central District of Boyer-Ahmad County, Kohgiluyeh and Boyer-Ahmad province, Iran. Its capital is the village of Gusheh-ye Shahzadeh Qasem. The previous capital of the rural district was the village of Madavan-e Olya, which had been elevated to city status as Madavan and later merged with the city of Yasuj.

== Demographics ==
=== Population ===
At the time of the 2006 National Census, the rural district's population was 25,908 in 5,303 households. There were 27,395 inhabitants in 6,447 households at the following census of 2011. The 2016 census measured the population of the rural district as 34,140 in 8,571 households. The most populous of its 27 villages was Mehrian, with 9,421 people.
