= Yasuj =

City in Kohgiluyeh and Boyer-Ahmad province, Iran

Yasuj ياسوج (Persian) یاسووج / یاسیچ (Southern Luri)
- City
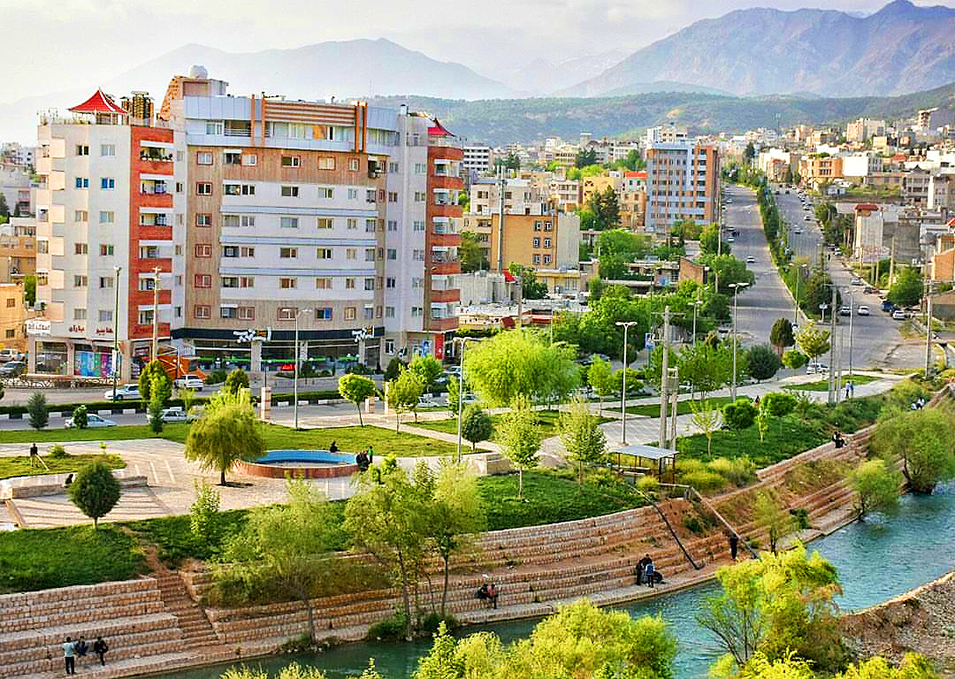
- Panoramic

- Location within Iran
- Coordinates: 30°40′02″N 51°34′47″E
- Country: Iran
- Province: Kohgiluyeh and Boyer-Ahmad
- County: Boyer-Ahmad
- District: Central

Government
  - Mayor: Keyvan Ashna

Population (2016)
  - Total: 134,532
- Time zone: UTC+3:30 (IRST)
- Website: www.yasuj.ir

Yasuj (Persian: ياسوج; [jɒːˈsuːdʒ]) (Note: Also romanized as Yasooj, Yāsūj, and Yesūj; Luri: (یاسووج), romanized as Jasuc, or (یاسیچ), romanized as Jasyč) is a city in the Central District of Boyer-Ahmad County, Kohgiluyeh and Boyer-Ahmad province, Iran, serving as capital of the province, the county, and the district.

Yasuj is an industrial city in the Zagros Mountains of southwestern Iran. The term Yasuj is also used to refer to the entire region.

Yasuj has a sugar processing plant.

== History ==
The area of Yasuj had been settled as early as the Bronze Age. Findings include the Martyrs Hills (dating from 3rd millennium BC), the Khosravi Hill from the Achaemenian period, the ancient site of Gerd, the Pataveh bridge, and the Pay-e Chol cemetery. Yasuj is the place where Alexander III of Macedon and his Macedonian forces stormed the Persian Gates (Darvazeh-ye Fars), and found a way into the Persian heartland (331 BC).

The Yasuj Museum, which opened in 2002, displays coins, statues, pottery, and bronze vessels recovered from surrounding archaeological sites.

In 2023, the city of Madavan and the villages of Balahzar, Jadval-e Ghureh-ye Mehrian, Madavan-e Sofla, Mehrian, Sarab-e Taveh, Servak, and Tall Khosrow merged with the city of Yasuj.

== Demographics ==
=== Population ===
At the time of the 2006 national census, the city's population was 96,786 in 20,297 households. The following census in 2011 counted 108,505 people in 26,304 households. The 2016 census measured the population of the city as 134,532 people in 34,850 households.

The population of the Central District, in 2016, which includes the city of Yasuj and some suburban villages, is just over 250,000 people.

Yasuj Census
Row	City Name	1976	1986	1991	1996	2006	2011	2016
1	Yasuj	4,524	29,991	48,957	69,133	96,786	108,505	134,532

== Climate ==
Yasuj has the typical continental-influenced Mediterranean climate (Köppen Csa) of western Iran, though because of its location in the direct line of rain-bearing winds from the Persian Gulf it is the wettest Iranian city south of the Alborz Mountains with an annual rainfall nine times that of Isfahan and twice that of Kermanshah. The heavy precipitation allows the existence of small glaciers on the highest Zagros peaks – in contrast the Kuhrud Mountains to the east have no glaciers despite being of the same height due to aridity. The long dry season sees only on average 4 millimetres (0.16 in) of rainfall between June and September, with the wet season extending into October, unlike many other Mediterranean climates.

Climate data for Yasouj (1991-2020, extremes 1987-2020)
Month	Jan	Feb	Mar	Apr	May	Jun	Jul	Aug	Sep	Oct	Nov	Dec	Year
Record high °C (°F)	21.0 (69.8)	25.0 (77.0)	28.2 (82.8)	29.6 (85.3)	36.0 (96.8)	39.6 (103.3)	40.4 (104.7)	39.6 (103.3)	36.8 (98.2)	33.4 (92.1)	26.4 (79.5)	23.0 (73.4)	40.4 (104.7)
Mean daily maximum °C (°F)	9.4 (48.9)	11.7 (53.1)	15.7 (60.3)	20.8 (69.4)	27.2 (81.0)	33.2 (91.8)	35.6 (96.1)	35.0 (95.0)	31.3 (88.3)	25.1 (77.2)	17.0 (62.6)	12.3 (54.1)	22.9 (73.2)
Daily mean °C (°F)	2.9 (37.2)	5.1 (41.2)	8.9 (48.0)	13.7 (56.7)	19.1 (66.4)	24.3 (75.7)	27.0 (80.6)	26.1 (79.0)	21.9 (71.4)	16.2 (61.2)	9.3 (48.7)	5.1 (41.2)	15.0 (59.0)
Mean daily minimum °C (°F)	−2.5 (27.5)	−0.7 (30.7)	2.3 (36.1)	6.4 (43.5)	10.1 (50.2)	14.1 (57.4)	17.6 (63.7)	16.5 (61.7)	12.4 (54.3)	7.7 (45.9)	2.7 (36.9)	−0.8 (30.6)	7.2 (45.0)
Record low °C (°F)	−19.8 (−3.6)	−13.4 (7.9)	−6.6 (20.1)	−4.1 (24.6)	2.2 (36.0)	7.4 (45.3)	11.5 (52.7)	11.4 (52.5)	5.7 (42.3)	0.0 (32.0)	−5.6 (21.9)	−14.0 (6.8)	−19.8 (−3.6)
Average precipitation mm (inches)	160.1 (6.30)	134.0 (5.28)	154.6 (6.09)	77.9 (3.07)	17.2 (0.68)	1.0 (0.04)	1.1 (0.04)	2.6 (0.10)	0.9 (0.04)	14.2 (0.56)	97.2 (3.83)	156.0 (6.14)	816.8 (32.16)
Average precipitation days (≥ 1.0 mm)	9.4	8.6	8.2	6.7	1.9	0.2	0.3	0.5	0.1	1.5	5.7	7.4	50.5
Average relative humidity (%)	64	59	52	49	36	24	25	25	26	35	52	59	42.2
Average dew point °C (°F)	−3.8 (25.2)	−3.2 (26.2)	−2.0 (28.4)	1.7 (35.1)	1.5 (34.7)	0.3 (32.5)	3.5 (38.3)	2.7 (36.9)	−0.3 (31.5)	−1.3 (29.7)	−1.6 (29.1)	−3.1 (26.4)	−0.5 (31.2)
Mean monthly sunshine hours	194	192	228	241	315	356	339	334	313	285	214	205	3,216
Source: NCEI

Climate data for Yasouj (1987-2010, extremes 1987-2020)
Month	Jan	Feb	Mar	Apr	May	Jun	Jul	Aug	Sep	Oct	Nov	Dec	Year
Record high °C (°F)	21.0 (69.8)	25.0 (77.0)	28.2 (82.8)	29.6 (85.3)	36.0 (96.8)	39.6 (103.3)	40.4 (104.7)	39.6 (103.3)	36.8 (98.2)	33.4 (92.1)	26.4 (79.5)	23.0 (73.4)	40.4 (104.7)
Mean daily maximum °C (°F)	8.4 (47.1)	11.0 (51.8)	15.2 (59.4)	20.7 (69.3)	27.2 (81.0)	32.8 (91.0)	35.3 (95.5)	34.8 (94.6)	31.1 (88.0)	25.0 (77.0)	17.4 (63.3)	11.8 (53.2)	22.6 (72.6)
Daily mean °C (°F)	3.1 (37.6)	5.3 (41.5)	9.1 (48.4)	13.9 (57.0)	19.1 (66.4)	23.8 (74.8)	26.9 (80.4)	26.1 (79.0)	22.2 (72.0)	16.7 (62.1)	10.4 (50.7)	5.9 (42.6)	15.2 (59.4)
Mean daily minimum °C (°F)	−2.3 (27.9)	−0.3 (31.5)	2.9 (37.2)	7.1 (44.8)	11.0 (51.8)	14.8 (58.6)	18.5 (65.3)	17.5 (63.5)	13.2 (55.8)	8.4 (47.1)	3.5 (38.3)	-0.0 (32.0)	7.9 (46.2)
Record low °C (°F)	−19.8 (−3.6)	−13.4 (7.9)	−6.6 (20.1)	−4.1 (24.6)	2.2 (36.0)	7.4 (45.3)	11.5 (52.7)	11.4 (52.5)	5.7 (42.3)	0.0 (32.0)	−5.6 (21.9)	−14.0 (6.8)	−19.8 (−3.6)
Average precipitation mm (inches)	170.4 (6.71)	150.3 (5.92)	151.6 (5.97)	69.9 (2.75)	14.2 (0.56)	0.9 (0.04)	1.1 (0.04)	2.4 (0.09)	1.0 (0.04)	11.2 (0.44)	68.2 (2.69)	182.1 (7.17)	823.3 (32.42)
Average precipitation days (≥ 1.0 mm)	10.2	8.7	9.6	6.1	1.8	0.2	0.4	0.4	0.1	1.5	5.1	8.6	52.7
Average snowy days (≥ 1.0 mm)	6.9	3.0	1.1	0.0	0.0	0.0	0.0	0.0	0.0	0.0	0.3	2.9	14.2
Average relative humidity (%)	71	63	55	51	37	27	27	27	27	37	52	64	45
Average dew point °C (°F)	−3.8 (25.2)	−3.2 (26.2)	−2.0 (28.4)	1.7 (35.1)	1.5 (34.7)	0.3 (32.5)	3.5 (38.3)	2.7 (36.9)	−0.3 (31.5)	−1.3 (29.7)	−1.6 (29.1)	−3.1 (26.4)	−0.5 (31.2)
Mean monthly sunshine hours	183.9	189.2	212.7	240.2	320.6	358.5	343.5	329.7	314.2	286.1	218.9	193.3	3,190.8
Source 1: IRIMO
Source 2: NCEI(dew point and extremes for 1991-2020)

== Economy ==
The economy of Yasuj is based on the following local activities:

- baskets
- carpets/rugs
- mosaic tiles
- bricks
- livestock feed

By 2014 a new refinery will be constructed by the private sector, at a cost of $2.2 billion. It will produce petrol, gasoil, kerosene, furnace oil, liquefied gas, asphalt, and sulfur.

== Education ==
- Yasouj University
- Yasuj University of Medical Sciences
- Yasuj Azad University

== See also ==
- Seyyed Nasir Hosseini (Imam of Friday Prayer, of Yasuj)

== Notes ==
یاسوج شهر بزرگان
