= Turkmenistan women's national football team =

Turkmenistan women's national association football team

Turkmenistan
- Association: Football Federation of Turkmenistan (Türkmenistanyň Futbol federasiýasy)
- Confederation: AFC (Asia)
- Sub-confederation: CAFA (Central Asia)
- Head coach: Boris Borowik
- Captain: Mariýa Çaryýewa
- Top scorer: Merjen Bagşyýewa; Swetlana Prýannikowa; Mariýa Çaryýewa; Laçyn Alymjanowa (1)
- FIFA code: TKM
First colours	Second colours

FIFA ranking
- Current: 141 ▼1 (16 June 2026)
- Highest: 136 (August 2023)
- Lowest: 141 (March – June 2025; December 2025; June 2026)

First international
- Kazakhstan 6–0 Turkmenistan (Alanya, Turkey; 24 February 2019)

Biggest defeat
- Romania 13–0 Turkmenistan (Alanya, Turkey; 27 February 2019)

CAFA Championship
- Appearances: 1 (first in 2022)
- Best result: Fourth Place (2022)

The Turkmenistan women's national football team (Turkmen: Türkmenistanyň futbol boýunça zenanlar milli ýygyndy toparynyň; Russian: Женская сборная Туркменистана по футболу) is the women's national football team of the country of Turkmenistan. The team was established in 2016, and is controlled by the Football Federation of Turkmenistan (TFF).

Turkmenistan made their international debut in 2019, facing Kazakhstan, a fellow Central Asian team, in a friendly match, which they lost 6–0.

== History ==
=== 2016–2022: fledging phase ===
The Turkmenistan women's national team was established in 2016, spurred by the growing popularity of women's football in Central Asia. the Football Federation appointed Kamil Mingazow as the head coach that same year. Despite the sport's under-developed status in Turkmenistan, it took them three years to make their international debut, facing Kazakhstan in a friendly match as preparation for the 2019 Turkish Women's Cup, where they suffered a 6–0 defeat. Their first-ever participation in an international tournament saw them finish at the bottom, losing all three matches - 13–0 to Romania, 11–1 to Uzbekistan, and 3–0 to Jordan, ultimately finishing eighth overall.

Turkmenistan initially entered the qualification campaign for the 2022 AFC Women's Asian Cup, which would have been their first official qualification tournament. However, they later withdrew due to travel restrictions related to the COVID-19 pandemic.

Their first CAFA Women's Championship campaign was in 2022; After two draws, a 1–1 draw against Host Tajikistan where Swetlana Prýannikowa scored to secure a point for the debutants, and a goalless draw against Kyrgyzstan, the team suffered losses in their remaining two matches against Iran (4–0) and Uzbekistan (6–0), to finish fourth in the tournament.

In 2023, Turkmenistan was ready for what might have been their first-ever Olympic qualifying campaign. However, despite initially entering the qualifiers and being drawn alongside Kyrgyzstan and India, they ultimately withdrew from the competition without providing a reason.

In preparation for the upcoming competition, the team had scheduled a friendly match against a European team; Bulgaria in Sofia. However, the match was canceled due to logistical issues beyond the control of both teams.

=== 2025: new coach ===
From June 1, 2025, Boris Borowik has been appointed head coach of the Turkmenistan women's national football team. In this position, he replaced Kamil Mingazov, who stood at the origins of the development of women's football in Turkmenistan. The first serious tournament for Boris Borovik's team was the 2026 Asian Cup qualifying tournament. Before the start of the tournament, the team, led by head coach Boris Borowik and his assistants Begenç Garaýew and Ýewgeniýa Spirina, held a preparatory training camp in Ashgabat.

== Results and fixtures ==
The following is a list of match results in the last 12 months, as well as any future matches that have been scheduled.

Legend

Win Draw Lose Void or postponed Fixture

== Coaching staff ==
=== Current coaching staff ===
As of 8 June 2022

Position	Name
Head coach	(Turkmenistan) Kamil Mingazov
Goalkeeping Coach	Akmyrat Gurbanow
Assistant Coach	Perhat Podarov
Assistant Coach	Bagtygul Gurbanova
Team Manager	Hurma Kuliyeva
Doctor	Aryzgul Kichigulova
Team Staff	Orazgeldi Geldiyev
Team Staff	Jumamyrat Jumamyradov
Team Staff	Yslam Kakabayev

=== Manager history ===
Name	Period	M	W	D	L	W%	Note
(Turkmenistan) Kamil Mingazow	2016–2025	9	0	2	7	0.00%	
(Turkmenistan) Boris Borowik	2025–present	0	0	0	0	0.00%	

== Players ==
=== Current squad ===
The following players were called up for the 2026 AFC Women's Asian Cup qualification matches from 29 June to 5 July 2025.

No.	Pos.	Player	Date of birth (age)	Club
1	GK	Aysha Amanberdiýewa	8 January 2004 (age 22)	(Turkish Football Federation) Dudullu Spor
12	GK	Amaliýa Karapetýan		(Football Federation of Turkmenistan) Ahal
21	GK	Elnura Maksýutowa		(Football Federation of Turkmenistan) Lebap
2	DF	Merjen Bagşyýewa		(Football Federation of Turkmenistan) Margiana
3	DF	Ejegül Durdyýewa		(Football Federation of Turkmenistan) Ahal
6	DF	Leýli Atajanowa		(Football Federation of Turkmenistan) Altyn Täç
7	MF	Aişa Allaýewa		(Football Federation of Turkmenistan) Lebap
9	DF	Jeren Mämmedowa		(Football Federation of Turkmenistan) Ahal
11	DF	Maýa Musaskaýa	6 January 2000 (age 26)	(Lithuanian Football Federation) MFA Žalgiris
17	DF	Aýlar Berdiýewa		(Football Federation of Turkmenistan) Ahal
4	MF	Şasenem Taganowa		(Football Federation of Turkmenistan) Margiana
8	MF	Läle Haýypowa		(Turkish Football Federation) Istanbul Bilgi
10	MF	Mariýa Çaryýewa		(Football Federation of Turkmenistan) Altyn Täç
13	MF	Angelina Zemskowa		(Football Federation of Turkmenistan) Altyn Täç
15	MF	Leýli Batyrowa		(Football Federation of Turkmenistan) Margiana
16	MF	Jemile Babaýewa		(Football Federation of Turkmenistan) Ahal
19	MF	Perwana Kurbanowa		(Football Federation of Turkmenistan) Ahal
20	MF	Malika Mämmedowa		(Football Federation of Turkmenistan) Ahal
–	MF	Halida Eşnyýazowa	14 February 1995 (age 31)	(Football Federation of Turkmenistan) Margiana
5	FW	Laçyn Alymjanowa		(Football Federation of Turkmenistan) Lebap
14	FW	Gülzada Hankuliýewa		(Football Federation of Turkmenistan) Altyn Täç
18	FW	Şaperi Şadurdyýewa		(Football Federation of Turkmenistan) Balkan

=== Previous squads ===
Bold indicates winning squads

CAFA Women's Championship

- 2022 Women's CAFA Championship

Turkish Women's Cup

- 2019 Turkish Women's Cup

== Records ==
As of 30 June 2022

*Players in bold are still active, at least at club level.

=== Most capped players ===
#	Player	Year(s)	Caps	Goals

=== Top goalscorers ===
#	Player	Year(s)	Goals	Caps
**1**	**Swetlana Prýannikowa**	2022–Present	1	4
**1**	Merjen Bagşyýewa	2019–Present	1	+4

== Competitive record ==
=== FIFA Women's World Cup ===
FIFA Women's World Cup record										Qualification record						
Year	Round	Position	Pld	W	D	L	GS	GA	GD	Pld	W	D	L	GS	GA	GD
(China) 1991	Part of Soviet Union									Part of Soviet Union						
(Sweden) 1995 to (Canada) 2015	Did not exist									Did not exist						
(France) 2019	Did not enter									Did not enter						
(Australia) (New Zealand) 2023	Withdrew from qualification									Via AFC Women's Asian Cup						
(Brazil) 2027	Did not qualify									Via AFC Women's Asian Cup						
(Costa Rica) (Jamaica) (Mexico) (United States) 2031	To be determined									To be determined						
(United Kingdom) 2035	To be determined									To be determined						
Appearances	0/10	–	–	–	–	–	–	–	–	–	–	–	–	–	–	–

=== Olympic Games ===
Summer Olympics record										Qualification record						
Year	Round	Position	Pld	W	D	L	GS	GA	GD	Pld	W	D	L	GS	GA	GD
(United States) 1996 to (Brazil) 2016	Did not exist									Did not exist						
(Japan) 2020	Did not enter									Did not enter						
(France) 2024	Withdrew from qualification									Withdrew						
(United States) 2028	Did not qualify									Via AFC Women's Asian Cup						
(Australia) 2032	To be determined									To be determined						
Appearances	0/9	–	–	–	–	–	–	–	–	–	–	–	–	–	–	–

=== AFC Women's Asian Cup ===
AFC Women's Asian Cup record										Qualification record						
Year	Round	Position	Pld	W	D*	L	GS	GA	GD	Pld	W	D*	L	GS	GA	GD
(Hong Kong) 1975 to (Japan) 1991	Part of Soviet Union									Part of Soviet Union						
(Malaysia) 1993 to (Jordan) 2018	Did not exist									Did not exist						
(India) 2022	Withdrew from qualification									Withdrew						
(Australia) 2026	Did not qualify									3	0	1	2	2	17	−15
(Uzbekistan) 2029	To be determined									To be determined						
Appearances	0/21	–	–	–	–	–	–	–	–	3	0	1	2	2	17	−15

*Draws include knockout matches decided on penalty kicks.

=== CAFA Women's Championship ===
CAFA Women's Championship record
Year	Round	Position	Pld	W	D*	L	GS	GA
(Uzbekistan) 2018	Withdrew							
(Tajikistan) 2022	Fourth Place	4th	4	0	2	2	1	11
2026	To be determined							
**Appearances**	**Fourth Place**	**4th**	**4**	**0**	**2**	**2**	**1**	**11**

*Draws include knockout matches decided on penalty kicks.

=== Other tournaments ===
==== Turkish Women's Cup ====
(Turkey) Turkish Women's Cup record
Year	Round	Position	Pld	W	D*	L	GS	GA
2019	Seventh place match	8th	4	0	0	4	1	37
**Appearances**	**Group stage**	**8th**	**4**	**0**	**0**	**4**	**1**	**37**

*Draws include knockout matches decided on penalty kicks.

== See also ==
- Sport in Turkmenistan
  - Football in Turkmenistan
    - Women's football in Turkmenistan
- Turkmenistan men's national football team
- Turkmenistan women's national futsal team
