= Sarrud-e Jonubi Rural District =

Rural district in Kohgiluyeh and Boyer-Ahmad province, Iran

Sarrud-e Jonubi Rural District Persian: دهستان سررود جنوبي
- Rural District
- Location within Iran
- Coordinates: 30°34′09″N 51°36′40″E
- Country: Iran
- Province: Kohgiluyeh and Boyer-Ahmad
- County: Boyer-Ahmad
- District: Central
- Capital: Aliabad-e Sartol

Population (2016)
  - Total: 53,726
- Time zone: UTC+3:30 (IRST)

Sarrud-e Jonubi Rural District (Persian: دهستان سررود جنوبي) is in the Central District of Boyer-Ahmad County, Kohgiluyeh and Boyer-Ahmad province, Iran. Its capital is the village of Aliabad-e Sartol. The previous capital of the rural district was the village of Tall Khosrow.

== Demographics ==
=== Population ===
At the time of the 2006 National Census, the rural district's population was 31,503 in 6,410 households. There were 44,112 inhabitants in 10,918 households at the following census of 2011. The 2016 census measured the population of the rural district as 53,726 in 14,197 households. The most populous of its 84 villages was Sarab-e Taveh, with 11,195 people.
