= Kohgiluyeh and Boyer-Ahmad province =

Province of Iran

Kohgiluyeh and Boyer-Ahmad Province استان کهگیلویه و بویراحمد (Persian)
- Province
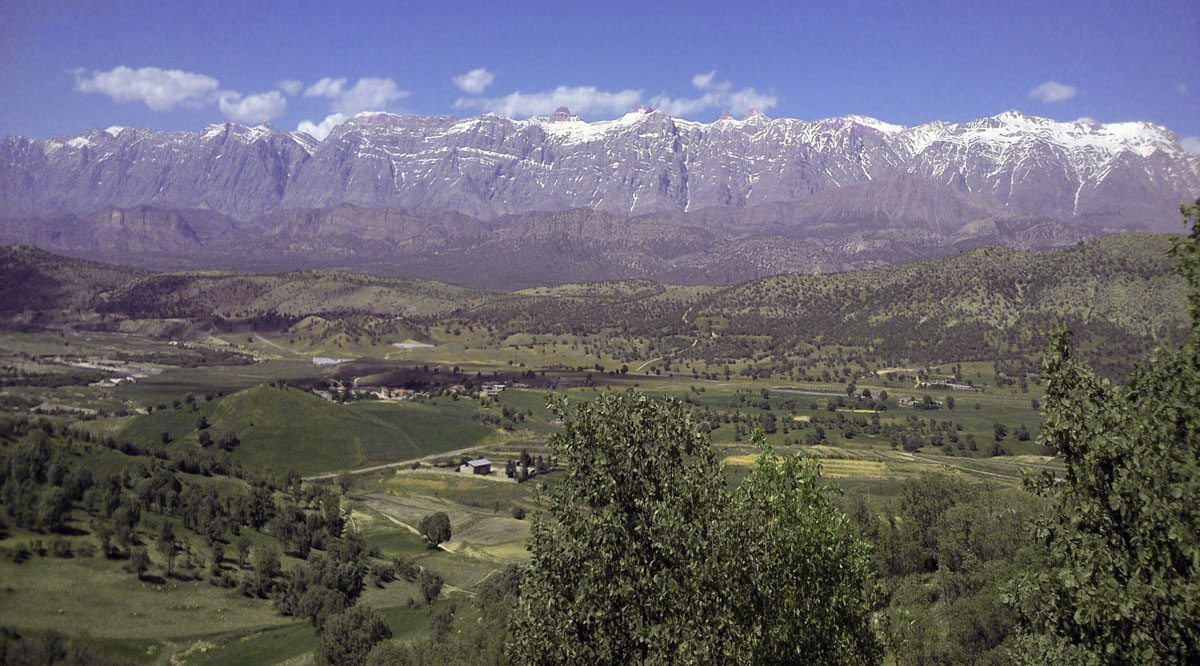
- Dena Range as seen from the southwest

- Location of Kohgiluyeh and Boyer-Ahmad province within Iran
- Coordinates: 30°43′N 50°50′E
- Country: Iran
- Region: Region 2
- Capital: Yasuj
- Counties: 9

Government
  - Governor-general: Yadollah Rahmani (Reformist)

Area
  - Total: 15,504 km^{2} (5,986 sq mi)

Population (2016)
  - Total: 713,052
  - Density: 45.991/km^{2} (119.12/sq mi)
- Time zone: UTC+03:30 (IRST)
- Main language(s): Luri
- HDI (2017): 0.796 high · 16th

Kohgiluyeh and Boyer-Ahmad province (Persian: استان کهگیلویه و بویراحمد) (Note: Also romanized as Ostân-e Kohgiluyeh va Buyer-Ahmad; Luri: استان کهگیلویه و بِیرَمَد, romanized as Ostān-e Kohgīlūya-vo Beyramad) is one of the 31 provinces of Iran. It is in the southwest of the country, in Iran's Region 2. Its capital is the city of Yasuj. The province covers an area of 15,563 square kilometers.

== Demographics ==
=== Language ===
2023 mother tongue composition
Language	Percent
Southern Luri	71.5%
Persian	21.0%
Qashqai	1.4%
Bakhtiari	1.4%
Khuzestani Arabic	0.9%
Mixed	3.8%

=== Population ===
At the time of the 2006 National Census, the province's population was 621,428 in 125,779 households. According to the National Population and Housing Census, the population of Kohgiluyeh and Boyer-Ahmad Province in 2011 was 658,629 in 156,176 households. The 2016 census measured the population of the province as 713,052 inhabitants in 186,320 households.

=== Administrative divisions ===

The population history and structural changes of Kohgiluyeh and Boyer-Ahmad Province's administrative divisions over three consecutive censuses are shown in the following table.

Kohgiluyeh and Boyer-Ahmad Province
Counties	2006	2011	2016
Bahmai	35,067	37,048	38,136
Basht (Note: Separated from Gachsaran County after the 2006 census)	—	20,699	21,690
Boyer-Ahmad	212,552	243,771	299,885
Charam (Note: Separated from Kohgiluyeh County after the 2006 census)	—	32,159	33,543
Dana	52,242	52,040	42,539
Gachsaran	131,628	119,217	124,096
Kohgiluyeh	189,939	153,695	131,351
Landeh (Note: Separated from Kohgiluyeh County after the 2011 census)	—	—	21,812
Margown (Note: Separated from Boyer-Ahmad County after the 2016 census)	—	—	—
Total	621,428	658,629	713,052

=== Cities ===
According to the 2016 census, 397,461 people (over 55% of the population of Kohgiluyeh and Boyer-Ahmad Province) live in the following cities:

City	Population
Basht	10,764
Charam	15,218
Chitab	1,164
Dehdasht	57,036
Dishmuk	5,791
Dogonbadan	96,728
Garab-e Sofla	545
Landeh	12,772
Likak	19,857
Madavan	18,078
Margown	3,135
Pataveh	2,284
Qaleh Raisi	3,269
Sarfaryab	1,995
Sisakht	7,855
Suq	6,438
Yasuj	134,532

== Geography ==
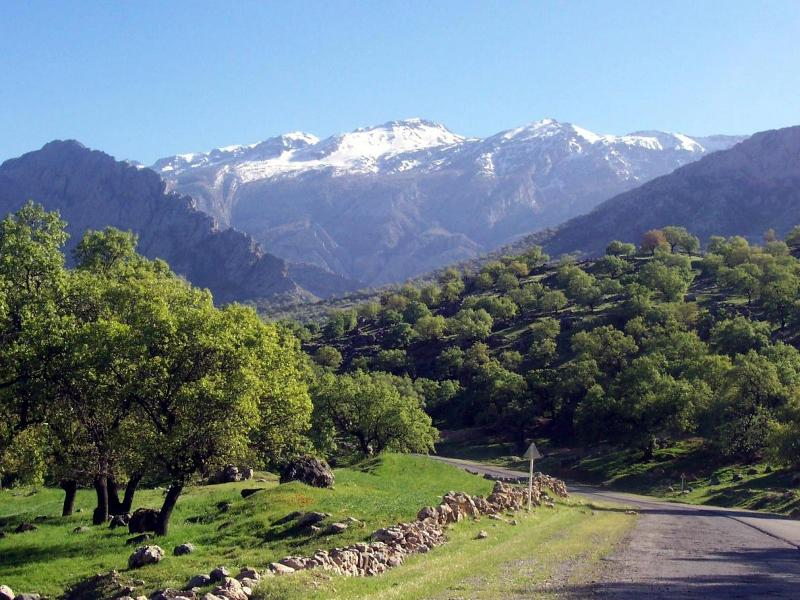
Khamin Mount; Shadegan, Basht Gachsaran County at the end of winter

Kohgiluyeh and Boyer-Ahmad province is located in the south of Iran, and shares borders with five provinces: Isfahan and Fars provinces to the east, Bushehr province to the south, Khuzestan to the west and Chaharmahal and Bakhtiari to the north.

The province is mostly mountainous in terrain, part of the Zagros range. The highest point is the Dena summit with a height of 5,109 metres. The mountain range of Dena, which reaches an elevation of 4,000 metres, is located in the province, and is covered with oak forests. Another mountain is Khamin or Khami, which is located in Gachsaran County.

== Colleges and universities ==
- University of Yasuj
- Islamic Azad University of Gachsaran
- Yasuj University of Medical Sciences

== See also ==
- Seyyed Nasir Hosseini (the representative of Guardianship of the Islamic Jurist, in the province)
