= 2026 AFC Women's Asian Cup Group B =

Football results

Group B of the 2026 AFC Women's Asian Cup was played from 3 to 9 March 2026, with the group made up of North Korea, defending champions China, Bangladesh and Uzbekistan. The top two teams, China and North Korea, along with third-placed Uzbekistan (as one of the two best third-placed teams), advanced to the quarter-finals.

== Teams ==
Draw position	Team	Zone	Pot	Method of qualification	Date of qualification	Finals appearance	Last appearance	Previous best performance	FIFA Rankings June 2025 (Note: The June 2025 FIFA Women's World Ranking was used for seeding for the final draw.)	FIFA Rankings December 2025
B1	North Korea	EAFF	1	Group H winners	5 July 2025	11th	2010	Winners (2001, 2003, 2008)	10	9
B2	China	EAFF	2	2022 champions	18 December 2024	16th	2022	Winners (1986, 1989, 1991, 1993, 1995, 1997, 1999, 2006, 2022)	16	17
B3	Bangladesh	SAFF	4	Group C winners	2 July 2025	1st	—	Debut	104	112
B4	Uzbekistan	CAFA	3	Group F winners	5 July 2025	6th	2003	Group stage (1995, 1997, 1999, 2001, 2003)	52	49

== Standings ==
Pos	Team	Pld	W	D	L	GF	GA	GD	Pts	Qualification
1	China	3	3	0	0	7	1	+6	9	Advance to knockout stage
2	North Korea	3	2	0	1	9	2	+7	6	Advance to knockout stage
3	Uzbekistan	3	1	0	2	4	6	−2	3	Advance to knockout stage
4	Bangladesh	3	0	0	3	0	11	−11	0	

Source: AFC

== Matches ==
=== North Korea vs Uzbekistan ===
3 March 2026
13:00 UTC+11

North Korea	3–0	Uzbekistan
Myong Yu-jong 6', 24' (pen.), 41' (pen.)	Report (AFC); Report (FIFA)

Western Sydney Stadium, Sydney
Attendance: 1,216
Referee: Casey Reibelt (Australia)

GK	18	Yu Son-gum
DF	2	Ri Myong-gum
DF	5	An Kuk-hyang (c)		(substituted off) 60'
DF	14	Hwang Yu-yong
DF	23	Ri Hye-gyong
MF	7	Myong Yu-jong	(yellow card) 45+6'	(substituted off) 45+11'
MF	9	Kim Song-gyong		(substituted off) 78'
MF	12	Hong Song-ok		(substituted off) 78'
MF	20	Chae Un-yong
FW	11	Han Jin-hong		(substituted off) 45+10'
FW	17	Kim Kyong-yong		(substituted off) 60'
Substitutions:
FW	19	Sin Hyang		(substituted on) 45+10'
FW	10	Ri Hak		(substituted on) 45+11'
DF	3	Ri Kum-hyang		(substituted on) 60'
FW	24	Ri Song-a		(substituted on) 60'
DF	6	An Pok-yong		(substituted on) 78'
FW	13	Jon Ryong-jong		(substituted on) 78'
Manager:
Ri Song-ho

GK	1	Maftuna Jonimqulova		(substituted off) 14'
DF	2	Madina Khikmatova	(yellow card) 55'
DF	3	Kholida Dadaboeva
DF	6	Dilrabo Asadova	(yellow card) 45+8'
DF	11	Maftuna Shoyimova
MF	7	Nilufar Kudratova
MF	8	Ilvina Ablyakimova		(substituted off) 46'
MF	15	Umida Zoirova
MF	16	Zarina Mamatkarimova	(yellow card) 45+4'
FW	10	Diyorakhon Khabibullaeva		(substituted off) 90'
FW	17	Lyudmila Karachik (c)		(substituted off) 67'
Substitutions:
GK	13	Zarina Saidova		(substituted on) 14'
MF	14	Gulzoda Amirova	(yellow card) 90+4'	(substituted on) 46'
DF	22	Sevinch Kuchkorova		(substituted on) 67'
DF	19	Laylo Tilovova		(substituted on) 90'
Manager:
(Lithuania) Kotryna Kulbytė

Player of the Match:
(North Korea) Myong Yu-jong

Assistant referees:
Emma Kocbek (Australia)
Madelaine Allum (Australia)
Fourth official:
Lara Lee (Australia)
Video assistant referee:
Kate Jacewicz (Australia)
Assistant video assistant referee:
Jumpei Iida (Japan)

Statistics	North Korea	Uzbekistan
Possession	80.8%	19.2%
Shots	28	1
Shots on target	6	0
Passes	484	122
Fouls committed	7	14
Corner kicks	12	0

=== China vs Bangladesh ===
3 March 2026
19:00 UTC+11

China	2–0	Bangladesh
Wang Shuang 44'; Zhang Rui 45+1'	Report (AFC); Report (FIFA)

Western Sydney Stadium, Sydney
Attendance: 6,006
Referee: Pansa Chaisanit (Thailand)

GK	22	Chen Chen
DF	4	Wang Linlin
DF	5	Wu Haiyan (c)
DF	20	Zhang Chengxue
DF	25	Lyu Yatong	(yellow card) 10'	(substituted off) 77'
MF	7	Wang Shuang		(substituted off) 63'
MF	15	Wang Aifang
MF	16	Liu Jing		(substituted off) 63'
MF	26	Zhang Rui
FW	9	Wurigumula		(substituted off) 77'
FW	13	Jin Kun		(substituted off) 46'
Substitutions:
FW	17	Xie Zongmei		(substituted on) 46'
MF	6	Zhang Xin		(substituted on) 63'
MF	18	Tang Jiali		(substituted on) 63'
DF	3	Chen Qiaozhu		(substituted on) 77'
FW	23	Shao Ziqin		(substituted on) 77'
Manager:
(Australia) Ante Milicic

GK	23	Mile Akter
DF	4	Afeida Khandaker (c)
DF	5	Kohati Kisku
DF	21	Nabiran Khatun	(substituted off) 52'
MF	2	Sheuli Azim	(substituted off) 46'
MF	3	Shamsunnahar
MF	6	Monika Chakma
MF	8	Maria Manda
FW	17	Ritu Porna Chakma
FW	20	Shamsunnahar Jr.	(substituted off) 86'
FW	25	Umehla Marma	(substituted off) 46'
Substitutions:
FW	10	Tohura Khatun	(substituted on) 46'
DF	14	Halima Akther	(substituted on) 46'
MF	7	Sapna Rani	(substituted on) 52'
MF	9	Anika Rania Siddiqui	(substituted on) 86'
Manager:
(England) Peter Butler

Player of the Match:
(China) Wang Shuang

Assistant referees:
Nuannid Donjangreed (Thailand)
Sabreen Ala'badi (Jordan)
Fourth official:
Doumouh Al Bakkar (Lebanon)
Video assistant referee:
Sivakorn Pu-udom (Thailand)
Assistant video assistant referee:
Law Bik Chi (Hong Kong)

Statistics	China	Bangladesh
Possession	59.2%	40.8%
Shots	24	8
Shots on target	11	2
Passes	415	286
Fouls committed	6	5
Corner kicks	9	3

=== Bangladesh vs North Korea ===
6 March 2026
13:00 UTC+11

Bangladesh	0–5	North Korea
	Report (AFC); Report (FIFA)	Myong Yu-jong 45+5' (pen.); Kim Kyong-yong 45+7', 64'; Chae Un-yong 62'; Kim Hye-yong 90'

Western Sydney Stadium, Sydney
Attendance: 2,102
Referee: Doumouh Al Bakkar (Lebanon)

GK	23	Mile Akter
DF	5	Kohati Kisku
DF	4	Afeida Khandaker (c)	(yellow card) 45+4'
DF	24	Airin Khatun		(substituted off) 45+1'
DF	21	Nabiran Khatun	(yellow card) 43'	(substituted off) 56'
DF	3	Shamsunnahar
MF	6	Monika Chakma
MF	8	Maria Manda
FW	20	Shamsunnahar Jr.	(yellow card) 31'	(substituted off) 45+1'
FW	10	Tohura Khatun		(substituted off) 45+1'
FW	17	Ritu Porna Chakma
Substitutions:
MF	7	Sapna Rani		(substituted on) 45+1'
MF	9	Anika Rania Siddiqui		(substituted on) 45+1'
MF	25	Umehla Marma		(substituted on) 45+1'
DF	16	Unnoti Khatun		(substituted on) 56'
Manager:
(England) Peter Butler

GK	18	Yu Son-gum
DF	2	Ri Myong-gum
DF	23	Ri Hye-gyong
DF	5	An Kuk-hyang (c)
DF	14	Hwang Yu-yong	(substituted off) 76'
MF	20	Chae Un-yong	(substituted off) 65'
MF	7	Myong Yu-jong
MF	9	Kim Song-gyong
MF	12	Hong Song-ok	(substituted off) 76'
FW	11	Han Jin-hong	(substituted off) 45+2'
FW	17	Kim Kyong-yong	(substituted off) 65'
Substitutions:
FW	8	Choe Il-son	(substituted on) 45+2'
FW	19	Sin Hyang	(substituted on) 65'
MF	22	Kim Hye-yong	(substituted on) 65'
MF	16	Song Chun-sim	(substituted on) 76'
FW	24	Ri Song-a	(substituted on) 76'
Manager:
Ri Song-ho

Player of the Match:
(North Korea) Kim Kyong-yong

Assistant referees:
Amal Badhafari (United Arab Emirates)
Riiohlang Dhar (India)
Fourth official:
Mahnaz Zokaee (Iran)
Video assistant referee:
Meshari Al-Shamari (Qatar)
Assistant video assistant referee:
Mamdouh Al-Shadan (Saudi Arabia)

Statistics	Bangladesh	North Korea
Possession	34.8%	65.2%
Shots	0	31
Shots on target	0	11
Passes	253	463
Fouls committed	4	7
Corner kicks	0	6

=== Uzbekistan vs China ===
6 March 2026
19:00 UTC+11

Uzbekistan	0–3	China
	Report (AFC); Report (FIFA)	Shao Ziqin 30' (pen.); Li Qingtong 51', 77'

Western Sydney Stadium, Sydney
Attendance: 8,322
Referee: Supiree Testhomya (Thailand)

GK	1	Maftuna Jonimqulova
DF	2	Madina Khikmatova		(substituted off) 85'
DF	11	Maftuna Shoyimova	(yellow card) 90'
DF	3	Kholida Dadaboeva
DF	6	Dilrabo Asadova	(yellow card) 8'
MF	16	Zarina Mamatkarimova	(yellow card) 63'	(substituted off) 76'
MF	8	Ilvina Ablyakimova	(yellow card) 35'	(substituted off) 59'
MF	7	Nilufar Kudratova	(yellow card) 60'	(substituted off) 76'
MF	17	Lyudmila Karachik (c)	(yellow card) 37'	(substituted off) 85'
MF	15	Umida Zoirova
FW	10	Diyorakhon Khabibullaeva
Substitutions:
DF	21	Leyla Oraniyazova		(substituted on) 59'
DF	22	Sevinch Kuchkorova		(substituted on) 76'
FW	24	Ominakhon Valikhanova		(substituted on) 76'
MF	5	Solikha Khusniddinova		(substituted on) 85'
MF	9	Feruza Turdiboeva		(substituted on) 85'
Manager:
(Lithuania) Kotryna Kulbytė

GK	22	Chen Chen
DF	21	Li Mengwen
DF	8	Yao Wei
DF	4	Wang Linlin
DF	3	Chen Qiaozhu (c)	(substituted off) 86'
MF	14	Li Qingtong
MF	10	Wang Yanwen	(substituted off) 87'
MF	11	Wu Chengshu	(substituted off) 66'
MF	6	Zhang Xin
MF	19	Zhang Linyan	(substituted off) 81'
FW	23	Shao Ziqin	(substituted off) 81'
Substitutions:
MF	18	Tang Jiali	(substituted on) 66'
FW	17	Xie Zongmei	(substituted on) 81'
FW	24	Yuan Cong	(substituted on) 81'
DF	2	Wang Ying	(substituted on) 86'
MF	16	Liu Jing	(substituted on) 87'
Manager:
(Australia) Ante Milicic

Player of the Match:
(China) Li Qingtong

Assistant referees:
Supawan Hinthong (Thailand)
Nuannid Donjangreed (Thailand)
Fourth official:
Pansa Chaisanit (Thailand)
Video assistant referee:
Sivakorn Pu-udom (Thailand)
Assistant video assistant referee:
Jumpei Iida (Japan)

Statistics	Uzbekistan	China
Possession	22.4%	77.6%
Shots	0	27
Shots on target	0	11
Passes	178	577
Fouls committed	12	3
Corner kicks	0	11

=== Bangladesh vs Uzbekistan ===
9 March 2026
17:00 UTC+8

Bangladesh	0–4	Uzbekistan
	Report (AFC); Report (FIFA)	Khabibullaeva 10'; Nozimova 62', 66'; Kudratova 88'

Perth Rectangular Stadium, Perth
Attendance: 1,117
Referee: Mahnaz Zokaee (Iran)

GK	23	Mile Akter	(yellow card) 7'
DF	2	Sheuli Azim		(substituted off) 64'
DF	5	Kohati Kisku
DF	6	Monika Chakma
DF	3	Shamsunnahar
MF	25	Umehla Marma		(substituted off) 64'
MF	8	Maria Manda
MF	4	Afeida Khandaker (c)
MF	17	Ritu Porna Chakma
FW	9	Anika Rania Siddiqui		(substituted off) 64'
FW	10	Tohura Khatun
Substitutions:
FW	12	Sauravi Akanda Prity		(substituted on) 64'
DF	14	Halima Akther		(substituted on) 64'
FW	20	Shamsunnahar Jr.		(substituted on) 64'
Manager:
(England) Peter Butler

GK	1	Maftuna Jonimqulova
DF	2	Madina Khikmatova
DF	21	Leyla Oraniyazova
DF	11	Maftuna Shoyimova
DF	15	Umida Zoirova
MF	7	Nilufar Kudratova
MF	8	Ilvina Ablyakimova	(substituted off) 60'
MF	14	Gulzoda Amirova	(substituted off) 45'
MF	9	Feruza Turdiboeva	(substituted off) 45'
MF	17	Lyudmila Karachik (c)
FW	10	Diyorakhon Khabibullaeva	(substituted off) 90+1'
Substitutions:
MF	5	Solikha Khusniddinova	(substituted on) 45'
MF	23	Asalkhon Aminjanova	(substituted on) 45'
FW	18	Dildora Nozimova	(substituted on) 60'
DF	20	Kamila Zaripova	(substituted on) 90+1'
Manager:
(Lithuania) Kotryna Kulbytė

Player of the Match:
(Uzbekistan) Diyorakhon Khabibullaeva

Assistant referees:
Park Mi-suk (South Korea)
Riiohlang Dhar (India)
Fourth official:
Doumouh Al Bakkar (Lebanon)
Video assistant referee:
Mamdouh Al-Shadan (Saudi Arabia)
Assistant video assistant referee:
Kim Hee-gon (South Korea)

Statistics	Bangladesh	Uzbekistan
Possession	55.5%	44.5%
Shots	17	13
Shots on target	3	7
Passes	388	325
Fouls committed	7	5
Corner kicks	2	3

=== North Korea vs China ===
9 March 2026
20:00 UTC+11

North Korea	1–2	China
Kim Kyong-yong 32'	Report (AFC); Report (FIFA)	Chen Qiaozhu 34'; Wang Shuang 45+4'

Western Sydney Stadium, Sydney
Attendance: 9,093
Referee: Lê Thị Ly (Vietnam)

GK	18	Yu Son-gum
DF	14	Hwang Yu-yong		(substituted off) 60'
DF	5	An Kuk-hyang (c)	(yellow card) 84'
DF	23	Ri Hye-gyong
DF	2	Ri Myong-gum	(yellow card) 76'
MF	12	Hong Song-ok
MF	7	Myong Yu-jong
MF	9	Kim Song-gyong	(yellow card) 5'	(substituted off) 75'
MF	20	Chae Un-yong		(substituted off) 74'
FW	17	Kim Kyong-yong		(substituted off) 60'
FW	11	Han Jin-hong		(substituted off) 86'
Substitutions:'
FW	8	Choe Il-son		(substituted on) 60'
MF	16	Song Chun-sim		(substituted on) 60'
MF	22	Kim Hye-yong		(substituted on) 74'
MF	6	An Pok-yong	(yellow card) 77'	(substituted on) 75'
FW	19	Sin Hyang		(substituted on) 86'
Manager:
Ri Song-ho

GK	22	Chen Chen	(yellow card) 82'
DF	20	Zhang Chengxue
DF	5	Wu Haiyan (c)
DF	8	Yao Wei
DF	3	Chen Qiaozhu	(yellow card) 89'
MF	9	Wurigumula		(substituted off) 69'
MF	26	Zhang Rui		(substituted off) 74'
MF	15	Wang Aifang
MF	19	Zhang Linyan		(substituted off) 89'
FW	23	Shao Ziqin		(substituted off) 88'
FW	7	Wang Shuang	(yellow card) 49'
Substitutions:
MF	10	Wang Yanwen	(yellow card) 90+3'	(substituted on) 69'
MF	14	Li Qingtong		(substituted on) 74'
FW	24	Yuan Cong		(substituted on) 88'
FW	11	Wu Chengshu		(substituted on) 89'
Manager:
(Australia) Ante Milicic

Player of the Match:
(China) Wang Shuang

Assistant referees:
Hà Thị Phượng (Vietnam)
Nuannid Donjangreed (Thailand)
Fourth official:
Lara Lee (Australia)
Video assistant referee:
Kate Jacewicz (Australia)
Assistant video assistant referee:
Meshari Al-Shamari (Qatar)

Statistics	North Korea	China
Possession	54.5%	45.5%
Shots	6	7
Shots on target	2	3
Passes	330	275
Fouls committed	12	14
Corner kicks	5	3

== Discipline ==
Disciplinary points would have been used as a tiebreaker in the group if teams were tied on overall and head-to-head records, with a lower number of disciplinary points ranking higher. Points were calculated based on yellow and red cards received by players and coaches in all group matches as follows:

- first yellow card: –1 point;
- indirect red card (second yellow card): –3 points;
- direct red card: –3 points;
- yellow card and direct red card: –4 points.

Team	Match 1				Match 2				Match 3				Points
Team	Booked	(yellow card) (yellow-red card)	Sent off (straight red)	(yellow card) (red card)	Booked	(yellow card) (yellow-red card)	Sent off (straight red)	(yellow card) (red card)	Booked	(yellow card) (yellow-red card)	Sent off (straight red)	(yellow card) (red card)	Points
North Korea	–1								–4				–5
China	–1								–4				–5
Bangladesh					–3				–1				–4
Uzbekistan	–4				–6								–10
