= 2026 AFC Women's Asian Cup =

Tournament details
- Host country: Australia
- Dates: 1–21 March 2026
- Teams: 12 (from 1 confederation)
- Venues: 5 (in 3 host cities)

Final positions
- Champions: Japan (3rd title)
- Runners-up: Australia

Tournament statistics
- Matches played: 27
- Goals scored: 97 (3.59 per match)
- Attendance: 358,414 (13,275 per match)
- Top scorer(s): (Japan) Riko Ueki (6 goals)
- Best player: (Australia) Alanna Kennedy
- Best goalkeeper: (Japan) Ayaka Yamashita
- Fair play award: Japan

The 2026 AFC Women's Asian Cup was the 21st edition of the AFC Women's Asian Cup, the quadrennial international football tournament in Asia competed by the women's national teams in the Asian Football Confederation (AFC).

Australia was officially selected as the host nation by the AFC Women's Football Committee on 15 May 2024.

The tournament served as the final stage of Asian qualification for the 2027 FIFA Women's World Cup in Brazil. This will be the last time the qualifications will be linked, as a standalone qualifier for the FIFA Women's World Cup will be held starting from the 2031 edition onwards. For the first time, the tournament also served as the penultimate stage of Asian qualification for the 2028 Summer Olympics in Los Angeles, with all eight quarter-finalists qualifying for the 2028 AFC Women's Olympic Qualifying Tournament. This also marked the second time a country hosted the AFC Women's Asian Cup having hosted the FIFA Women's World Cup before. The first time was China when they hosted the 2010 Tournament after the World Cup three years earlier.

China were the defending champions, but were eliminated in the semi-finals by hosts Australia. Japan won the tournament for the third time by defeating Australia in the final.

== Host selection ==
The following four football associations submitted their interest to host the tournament by the 31 July 2022 deadline. Australia was selected as the host nation by the AFC Women's Football Committee on 15 March 2024 following the withdrawals of Jordan, Saudi Arabia and Uzbekistan.

- Australia – Australia submitted its interest in hosting the tournament also on 31 July. The country has previously hosted the 2006 AFC Women's Asian Cup, where they finished runners-up. Australia also hosted the 2023 FIFA Women's World Cup alongside New Zealand, which is the first FIFA Women's World Cup to be hosted by two nations. The country also hosted the 2015 Men's AFC Asian Cup.

=== Cancelled bids ===
- Jordan – Jordan previously hosted the 2018 AFC Women's Asian Cup, where they finished bottom of the group stage. Jordan also hosted the 2016 FIFA U-17 Women's World Cup, the first in an Arab country.
- Saudi Arabia – On 21 April 2022, Saudi Arabia submitted its bid to host the tournament. Saudi Arabia had never hosted any major women's football tournament, although it hosted the men's FIFA Confederations Cup from 1992 to 1997 and will host the men's Asian Cup in 2027. On 2 December, the Saudi delegation submitted its bid to host the 2026 edition. On 23 February 2024, Saudi Arabia withdrew their bid.
- Uzbekistan – The Central Asian nation submitted its interest on 21 April 2022. The country had never hosted a major women's football tournament before, though it has played in the women's Asian Cup five times. The country has hosted various men's youth competitions, such as the 2008 and 2010 AFC U-16 Championships, the 2022 AFC U-23 Asian Cup and the 2023 AFC U-20 Asian Cup. On 23 February 2024, Uzbekistan withdrew their bid. The AFC ultimately awarded Uzbekistan the 2029 AFC Women's Asian Cup hosting rights, as the sole bidder.

== Qualification ==
The host country Australia qualified automatically, along with the top three teams from the 2022 AFC Women's Asian Cup.

Teams qualified Teams did not qualify Teams did not enter No women's team or not a FIFA member

=== Qualified teams ===
The following teams qualified for the tournament:

Team	Method of qualification	Date of qualification	Finals appearance	Last appearance	Previous best performance
Australia	Hosts	15 May 2024	7th	2022	Champions (2010)
China	2022 champions	18 December 2024	16th	2022	Champions (1986, 1989, 1991, 1993, 1995, 1997, 1999, 2006, 2022)
South Korea	2022 runners-up	18 December 2024	14th	2022	Runners-up (2022)
Japan	2022 third place	18 December 2024	18th	2022	Champions (2014, 2018)
Iran	Group A winners	19 July 2025	2nd	2022	Group stage (2022)
India	Group B winners	5 July 2025	10th	2022	Runners-up (1979, 1983)
Bangladesh	Group C winners	2 July 2025	1st	—N/a	Debut
Chinese Taipei	Group D winners	5 July 2025	15th	2022	Champions (1977, 1979, 1981)
Vietnam	Group E winners	5 July 2025	10th	2022	Sixth place (2014)
Uzbekistan	Group F winners	5 July 2025	6th	2003	Group stage (1995, 1997, 1999, 2001, 2003)
Philippines	Group G winners	5 July 2025	11th	2022	Semi-finals (2022)
North Korea	Group H winners	5 July 2025	11th	2010	Champions (2001, 2003, 2008)

== Venues ==
All matches were held in venues across New South Wales, Queensland and Western Australia. The five selected venues were officially recommended for formal ratification by the AFC on 12 November 2024, including Sydney's Stadium Australia used in the 2015 men's Asian Cup and Perth Rectangular Stadium used in the 2024 Asian Olympic Qualifiers. Both hosted the 2023 World Cup

On 27 February 2025, it was confirmed the opening game would be held at Perth Stadium, with the final held at Stadium Australia.

2026 AFC Women's Asian Cup venues
Sydney
Stadium Australia	Western Sydney Stadium
Capacity: 79,500	Capacity: 30,000
Perth
Perth Stadium	Perth Rectangular Stadium
Capacity: 60,000	Capacity: 19,500
Gold Coast
Gold Coast Stadium
Capacity: 28,000

Note

- Table shows AFC's stated capacities and may differ from the stadium's actual capacity.

== Draw ==
The draw was held on 29 July 2025 in Sydney. The seeding was based on the June 2025 FIFA Women's World Ranking.

Pot 1	Pot 2	Pot 3	Pot 4
Australia (15) (hosts); Japan (7); North Korea (9)	China (17); South Korea (21); Vietnam (37)	Philippines (41); Chinese Taipei (42); Uzbekistan (51)	Iran (68); India (70); Bangladesh (128)

== Squads ==
Each team had to register a squad of a minimum of 18 players and maximum of 26 players, at least three of whom had to be goalkeepers (Regulations Article 24.4).

== Match officials ==
On 7 October 2025, the AFC announced the list of 14 referees, 16 assistant referees, two stand-by referees, two stand-by assistant referees and eleven video match officials for the tournament. Video assistant referees (VAR) would be used from the group stage for the first time in the competition's history.

Abdulla Al-Marri (Qatar), Abdullah Al-Shehri (Saudi Arabia), Khuloud Al-Zaabi (United Arab Emirates), and Ramina Tsoi (Kyrgyzstan) were selected for the tournament, however, they did not officiate in any matches. Sabreen Ala'badi (Jordan), who was originally selected as a standby assistant referee, replaced Tsoi. Mamdouh Al-Shadan (Saudi Arabia) and Meshari Al-Shammari (Qatar), who were not selected for the tournament, replaced Al-Marri and Al-Shehri.

Referees

- (Australia) Casey Reibelt
- (Australia) Lara Lee
- (China) Dong Fangyu
- (China) Tian Jin
- (Iran) Mahnaz Zokaee
- (Japan) Yoshimi Yamashita
- (Japan) Asaka Koizumi
- (South Korea) Oh Hyeon-jeong
- (South Korea) Kim Yu-jeong
- (Kyrgyzstan) Veronika Bernatskaia
- (Lebanon) Doumouh Al Bakkar
- (Thailand) Pansa Chaisanit
- (Thailand) Supiree Testhomya
- (Vietnam) Lê Thị Ly

Assistant referees

- (Australia) Madelaine Allum
- (Australia) Emma Kocbek
- (China) Bao Mengxiao
- (China) Xie Lijun
- (India) Riiohlang Dhar
- (Japan) Makoto Bozono
- (Japan) Chihiro Ikki
- (Jordan) Sabreen Ala'badi
- (South Korea) Park Mi-suk
- (South Korea) Lee Soo-bin
- (Palestine) Heba Saadia
- (North Korea) Hyon Un-mi
- (Thailand) Supawan Hinthong
- (Thailand) Nuannid Donjangreed
- (United Arab Emirates) Amal Badhafari
- (Vietnam) Hà Thị Phượng

Video assistant referees

- (Australia) Kate Jacewicz
- (China) Fu Ming
- (Hong Kong) Law Bik Chi
- (Japan) Jumpei Iida
- (South Korea) Kim Hee-gon
- (Saudi Arabia) Mamdouh Al-Shadan
- (Qatar) Meshari Al-Shammari
- (Singapore) Muhammad Taqi
- (Thailand) Sivakorn Pu-udom
- (Uzbekistan) Edita Mirabidova

Stand-by referees

- (Malaysia) Zainal Nurul Ain Izatty
- (Vietnam) Bùi Thị Thu Trang

Stand-by assistant referees

- (Iran) Bahareh Seifinahavandi

== Ceremonies ==
=== Opening ceremony ===
On 27 January 2026, the organising committee announced that Audrey Nuna would be performing at the opening ceremony ahead of the first game at Perth Stadium on 1 March. She also performed an exclusive half-time performance that was not broadcast.

As well as Nuna's performance, the ceremony also featured Torres Strait Islander artist Zipporah performing the tournament's first-ever official anthem called "That's How We Win" which was written by Nat Dunn, and a Welcome to Country. Representatives from all competing nations were officially welcomed in their respective native languages.

=== Closing ceremony ===
On 14 March 2026, it was announced that Australian artist G Flip would be performing at the closing ceremony, to take place before the Final at Stadium Australia on 21 March.

== Group stage ==
The top two teams of each group and the two best third-placed teams qualified for the quarter-finals.

Tiebreakers

Teams were ranked according to points (3 points for a win, 1 point for a draw, 0 points for a loss), and if tied on points, the following tiebreaking criteria were applied, in the order given, to determine the rankings:

1. Points in head-to-head matches among tied teams;
2. Goal difference in head-to-head matches among tied teams;
3. Goals scored in head-to-head matches among tied teams;
4. If more than two teams were tied, and after applying all head-to-head criteria above, a subset of teams were still tied, all head-to-head criteria above were reapplied exclusively to this subset of teams;
5. Goal difference in all group matches;
6. Goals scored in all group matches;
7. Penalty shoot-out if only two teams were tied and they met in the last round of the group;
8. Disciplinary points (yellow card = 1 point, red card as a result of two yellow cards = 3 points, direct red card = 3 points, yellow card followed by direct red card = 4 points);
9. Drawing of lots.

All times are local.

=== Group A ===
Pos	Team	Pld	W	D	L	GF	GA	GD	Pts	Qualification
1	South Korea	3	2	1	0	9	3	+6	7	Advance to knockout stage
2	Australia (H)	3	2	1	0	8	3	+5	7	Advance to knockout stage
3	Philippines	3	1	0	2	2	4	−2	3	Advance to knockout stage
4	Iran	3	0	0	3	0	9	−9	0	

Source: AFC
(H) Hosts
1 March 2026
17:00 UTC+8

Australia	1–0	Philippines
Kerr 14'	Report (AFC); Report (FIFA)

Perth Stadium, Perth
Attendance: 44,379
Referee: Dong Fangyu (China)
2 March 2026
19:00 UTC+10

South Korea	3–0	Iran
Choe Yu-ri 37'; Kim Hye-ri 59' (pen.); Ko Yoo-jin 75'	Report (AFC); Report (FIFA)

Gold Coast Stadium, Gold Coast
Attendance: 2,874
Referee: Veronika Bernatskaia (Kyrgyzstan)

5 March 2026
13:00 UTC+10

Philippines	0–3	South Korea
	Report (AFC); Report (FIFA)	Jeon Yu-gyeong 12'; Park Soo-jeong 15'; Mun Eun-ju 56'

Gold Coast Stadium, Gold Coast
Attendance: 2,332
Referee: Lê Thị Ly (Vietnam)
5 March 2026
19:00 UTC+10

Iran	0–4	Australia
	Report (AFC); Report (FIFA)	Sayer 8'; Fowler 27'; Kennedy 35', 58'

Gold Coast Stadium, Gold Coast
Attendance: 22,398
Referee: Asaka Koizumi (Japan)

8 March 2026
19:00 UTC+10

Iran	0–2	Philippines
	Report (AFC); Report (FIFA)	Eggesvik 29'; C. McDaniel 82'

Gold Coast Stadium, Gold Coast
Attendance: 2,384
Referee: Tian Jin (China)
8 March 2026
20:00 UTC+11

Australia	3–3	South Korea
Kennedy 32', 90+8'; Kerr 45+6'	Report (AFC); Report (FIFA)	Mun Eun-ju 13'; Kim Shin-ji 53' (pen.); Kang Chae-rim 56'

Stadium Australia, Sydney
Attendance: 60,279
Referee: Yoshimi Yamashita (Japan)

=== Group B ===
Pos	Team	Pld	W	D	L	GF	GA	GD	Pts	Qualification
1	China	3	3	0	0	7	1	+6	9	Advance to knockout stage
2	North Korea	3	2	0	1	9	2	+7	6	Advance to knockout stage
3	Uzbekistan	3	1	0	2	4	6	−2	3	Advance to knockout stage
4	Bangladesh	3	0	0	3	0	11	−11	0	

Source: AFC
3 March 2026
13:00 UTC+11

North Korea	3–0	Uzbekistan
Myong Yu-jong 6', 24' (pen.), 41' (pen.)	Report (AFC); Report (FIFA)

Western Sydney Stadium, Sydney
Attendance: 1,216
Referee: Casey Reibelt (Australia)
3 March 2026
19:00 UTC+11

China	2–0	Bangladesh
Wang Shuang 44'; Zhang Rui 45+1'	Report (AFC); Report (FIFA)

Western Sydney Stadium, Sydney
Attendance: 6,006
Referee: Pansa Chaisanit (Thailand)

6 March 2026
13:00 UTC+11

Bangladesh	0–5	North Korea
	Report (AFC); Report (FIFA)	Myong Yu-jong 45+5' (pen.); Kim Kyong-yong 45+7', 64'; Chae Un-yong 62'; Kim Hye-yong 90'

Western Sydney Stadium, Sydney
Attendance: 2,102
Referee: Doumouh Al Bakkar (Lebanon)
6 March 2026
19:00 UTC+11

Uzbekistan	0–3	China
	Report (AFC); Report (FIFA)	Shao Ziqin 30' (pen.); Li Qingtong 51', 77'

Western Sydney Stadium, Sydney
Attendance: 8,322
Referee: Supiree Testhomya (Thailand)

9 March 2026
17:00 UTC+8

Bangladesh	0–4	Uzbekistan
	Report (AFC); Report (FIFA)	Khabibullaeva 10'; Nozimova 62', 66'; Kudratova 88'

Perth Rectangular Stadium, Perth
Attendance: 1,117
Referee: Mahnaz Zokaee (Iran)
9 March 2026
20:00 UTC+11

North Korea	1–2	China
Kim Kyong-yong 32'	Report (AFC); Report (FIFA)	Chen Qiaozhu 34'; Wang Shuang 45+4'

Western Sydney Stadium, Sydney
Attendance: 9,093
Referee: Lê Thị Ly (Vietnam)

=== Group C ===
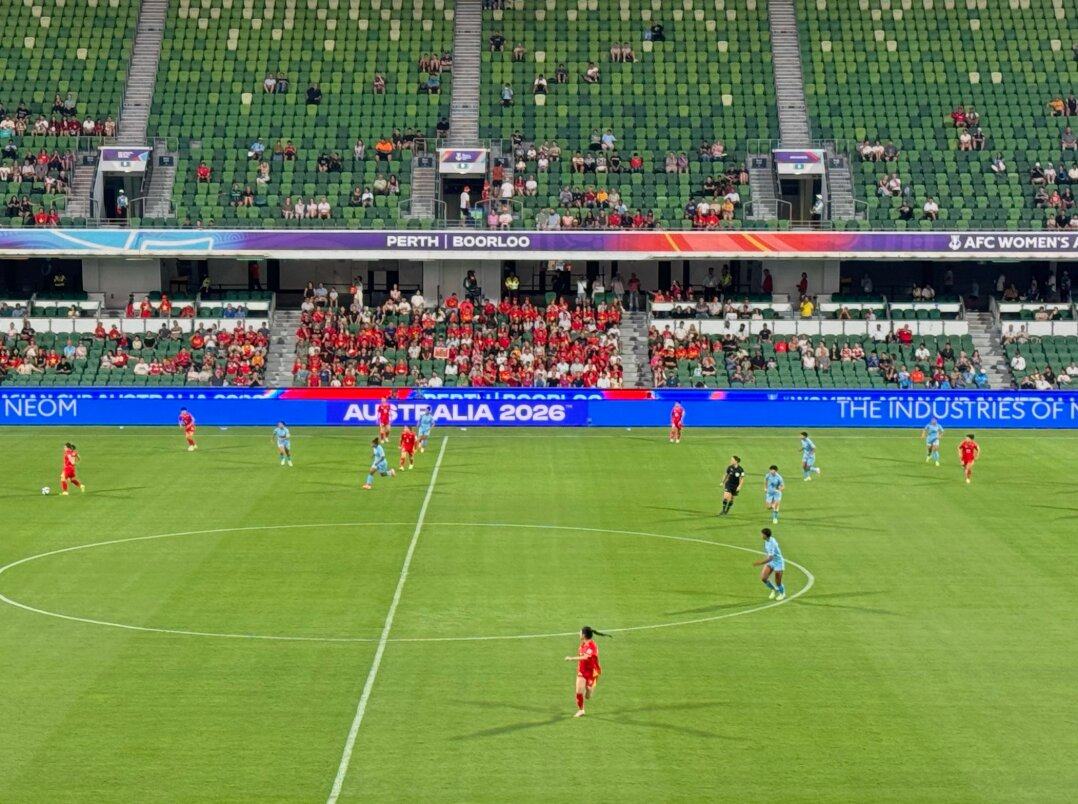
A moment from India vs Vietnam group match at the Perth Rectangular Stadium.

Pos	Team	Pld	W	D	L	GF	GA	GD	Pts	Qualification
1	Japan	3	3	0	0	17	0	+17	9	Advance to knockout stage
2	Chinese Taipei	3	2	0	1	4	3	+1	6	Advance to knockout stage
3	Vietnam	3	1	0	2	2	6	−4	3	
4	India	3	0	0	3	2	16	−14	0	

Source: AFC
4 March 2026
13:00 UTC+8

Japan	2–0	Chinese Taipei
Tanikawa 61'; Seike 90+2'	Report (AFC); Report (FIFA)

Perth Rectangular Stadium, Perth
Attendance: 1,223
Referee: Oh Hyeon-jeong (South Korea)
4 March 2026
19:00 UTC+8

Vietnam	2–1	India
Ngân Thị Vạn Sự 30', 90+4'	Report (AFC); Report (FIFA)	Nongrum 52'

Perth Rectangular Stadium, Perth
Attendance: 1,961
Referee: Kim Yu-jeong (South Korea)

7 March 2026
13:00 UTC+8

Chinese Taipei	1–0	Vietnam
Su Yu-hsuan 26'	Report (AFC); Report (FIFA)

Perth Rectangular Stadium, Perth
Attendance: 1,784
Referee: Lara Lee (Australia)
7 March 2026
19:00 UTC+8

India	0–11	Japan
	Report (AFC); Report (FIFA)	Yamamoto 4'; Hasegawa 13'; Miyazawa 20', 35', 81'; Seike 45+5' (pen.), 55'; Ueki 47', 50', 65'; Hijikata 62'

Perth Rectangular Stadium, Perth
Attendance: 3,233
Referee: Veronika Bernatskaia (Kyrgyzstan)

10 March 2026
17:00 UTC+8

Japan	4–0	Vietnam
Ueki 21'; Hamano 51'; Fujino 64'; Seike 67'	Report (AFC); Report (FIFA)

Perth Rectangular Stadium, Perth
Attendance: 3,648
Referee: Kim Yu-jeong (South Korea)
10 March 2026
20:00 UTC+11

India	1–3	Chinese Taipei
Kalyan 39'	Report (AFC); Report (FIFA)	Su Yu-hsuan 12'; Elangbam 45+8' (o.g.); Chen Yu-chin 77'

Western Sydney Stadium, Sydney
Attendance: 3,648
Referee: Casey Reibelt (Australia)

=== Ranking of third-placed teams ===
Pos	Grp	Team	Pld	W	D	L	GF	GA	GD	Pts	Qualification
1	B	Uzbekistan	3	1	0	2	4	6	−2	3	Advance to knockout stage
2	A	Philippines	3	1	0	2	2	4	−2	3	Advance to knockout stage
3	C	Vietnam	3	1	0	2	2	6	−4	3	

Source: AFC
Rules for classification: 1) Points; 2) Goal difference; 3) Goals scored; 4) Disciplinary points; 5) Drawing of lots.

== Knockout stage ==
The four quarter-final winners qualified directly for the 2027 Women's World Cup, while the four quarter-final losers competed in the play-in matches to determine the final two direct qualifiers, and the two Asian representatives in the inter-confederation play-offs. In addition, the eight quarter-finalists will make up the entrants into the 2028 AFC Women's Olympic Qualifying Tournament.

In the knockout stage, extra time and a penalty shoot-out were used to decide the winner if necessary.

=== Bracket ===
Quarter-finals
14 March – Sydney (SA)
South Korea	6
Uzbekistan	0
15 March – Sydney (SA)
Japan	7
Philippines	0
14 March – Perth (PRS)
China (a.e.t.)	2
Chinese Taipei	0
13 March – Perth (PRS)
Australia	2
North Korea	1

Semi-finals
18 March – Sydney (SA)
South Korea	1
Japan	4
17 March – Perth (PS)
China	1
Australia	2

Final
21 March – Sydney (SA)
Japan	1
Australia	0

Play-in matches for World Cup and inter-confederation play-offs 19 March – Gold Coast
Uzbekistan	0
Philippines	2
19 March – Gold Coast
Chinese Taipei	0
North Korea	4

=== Quarter-finals ===
The winners qualified for the 2027 FIFA Women's World Cup. The losers advanced to the play-in matches.

13 March 2026
18:00 UTC+8

Australia	2–1	North Korea
Kennedy 9'; Kerr 47'	Report (AFC); Report (FIFA)	Chae Un-yong 65'

Perth Rectangular Stadium, Perth
Attendance: 16,466
Referee: Veronika Bernatskaia (Kyrgyzstan)

14 March 2026
13:00 UTC+8

China	2–0 (a.e.t.)	Chinese Taipei
Shao Ziqin 94'; Chen Ying-hui 118' (o.g.)	Report (AFC); Report (FIFA)

Perth Rectangular Stadium, Perth
Attendance: 5,238
Referee: Oh Hyeon-jeong (South Korea)

14 March 2026
20:00 UTC+11

South Korea	6–0	Uzbekistan
Son Hwa-yeon 9'; Ko Yoo-jin 20'; Park Soo-jeong 57'; Ji So-yun 72'; Lee Eun-young 85'; Jang Sel-gi 90+3' (pen.)	Report (AFC); Report (FIFA)

Stadium Australia, Sydney
Attendance: 12,974
Referee: Lara Lee (Australia)

15 March 2026
16:00 UTC+11

Japan	7–0	Philippines
Tanaka 45'; Koga 45+3', 76'; Chiba 65'; Matsukubo 67'; Tanikawa 86'; Ueki 90'	Report (AFC); Report (FIFA)

Stadium Australia, Sydney
Attendance: 13,321
Referee: Dong Fangyu (China)

=== Semi-finals ===
17 March 2026
18:00 UTC+8

China	1–2	Australia
Zhang Linyan 26' (pen.)	Report (AFC); Report (FIFA)	Foord 17'; Kerr 58'

Perth Stadium, Perth
Attendance: 35,170
Referee: Supiree Testhomya (Thailand)

18 March 2026
20:00 UTC+11

South Korea	1–4	Japan
Kang Chae-rim 78'	Report (AFC); Report (FIFA)	Ueki 15'; Hamano 25'; Kumagai 75'; Chiba 81'

Stadium Australia, Sydney
Attendance: 17,367
Referee: Veronika Bernatskaia (Kyrgyzstan)

=== Play-in matches ===
The winners qualified for the 2027 FIFA Women's World Cup. The losers advanced to the inter-confederation play-offs.

19 March 2026
13:00 UTC+10

Uzbekistan	0–2	Philippines
	Report (AFC); Report (FIFA)	Beard 47'; Sawicki 52'

Gold Coast Stadium, Gold Coast
Attendance: 1,922
Referee: Casey Reibelt (Australia)

19 March 2026
19:00 UTC+10

Chinese Taipei	0–4	North Korea
	Report (AFC); Report (FIFA)	Hong Song-ok 32', 49', 68'; Kim Kyong-yong 52'

Gold Coast Stadium, Gold Coast
Attendance: 3,560
Referee: Asaka Koizumi (Japan)

=== Final ===
21 March 2026
20:00 UTC+11

Japan	1–0	Australia
Hamano 17'	Report (AFC); Report (FIFA)

Stadium Australia, Sydney
Attendance: 74,397
Referee: Kim Yu-jeong (South Korea)

== Goalscorers ==
There were 97 goals scored in 27 matches, for an average of 3.59 goals per match.

6 goals

- (Japan women's national football team) Riko Ueki

5 goals

- (Australia women's national soccer team) Alanna Kennedy

4 goals

- (Australia women's national soccer team) Sam Kerr
- (Japan women's national football team) Kiko Seike
- (North Korea women's national football team) Kim Kyong-yong
- (North Korea women's national football team) Myong Yu-jong

3 goals

- (Japan women's national football team) Maika Hamano
- (Japan women's national football team) Hinata Miyazawa
- (North Korea women's national football team) Hong Song-ok

2 goals

- (China women's national football team) Li Qingtong
- (China women's national football team) Shao Ziqin
- (China women's national football team) Wang Shuang
- (Chinese Taipei women's national football team) Su Yu-hsuan
- (Japan women's national football team) Remina Chiba
- (Japan women's national football team) Tōko Koga
- (Japan women's national football team) Momoko Tanikawa
- (North Korea women's national football team) Chae Un-yong
- (South Korea women's national football team) Kang Chae-rim
- (South Korea women's national football team) Ko Yoo-jin
- (South Korea women's national football team) Mun Eun-ju
- (South Korea women's national football team) Park Soo-jeong
- (Uzbekistan women's national football team) Dildora Nozimova
- (Vietnam women's national football team) Ngân Thị Vạn Sự

1 goal

- (Australia women's national soccer team) Caitlin Foord
- (Australia women's national soccer team) Mary Fowler
- (Australia women's national soccer team) Amy Sayer
- (China women's national football team) Chen Qiaozhu
- (China women's national football team) Zhang Linyan
- (China women's national football team) Zhang Rui
- (Chinese Taipei women's national football team) Chen Yu-chin
- (India women's national football team) Manisha Kalyan
- (India women's national football team) Sanfida Nongrum
- (Japan women's national football team) Aoba Fujino
- (Japan women's national football team) Yui Hasegawa
- (Japan women's national football team) Maya Hijikata
- (Japan women's national football team) Saki Kumagai
- (Japan women's national football team) Manaka Matsukubo
- (Japan women's national football team) Mina Tanaka
- (Japan women's national football team) Yuzuki Yamamoto
- (North Korea women's national football team) Kim Hye-yong
- (Philippines women's national football team) Angela Beard
- (Philippines women's national football team) Sara Eggesvik
- (Philippines women's national football team) Chandler McDaniel
- (Philippines women's national football team) Jaclyn Sawicki
- (South Korea women's national football team) Choe Yu-ri
- (South Korea women's national football team) Jang Sel-gi
- (South Korea women's national football team) Jeon Yu-gyeong
- (South Korea women's national football team) Ji So-yun
- (South Korea women's national football team) Kim Hye-ri
- (South Korea women's national football team) Kim Shin-ji
- (South Korea women's national football team) Lee Eun-young
- (South Korea women's national football team) Son Hwa-yeon
- (Uzbekistan women's national football team) Diyorakhon Khabibullaeva
- (Uzbekistan women's national football team) Nilufar Kudratova

1 own goal

- (Chinese Taipei women's national football team) Chen Ying-hui (against China)
- (India women's national football team) Panthoi Chanu Elangbam (against Chinese Taipei)

== Qualified teams for the FIFA Women's World Cup ==
The following six teams from AFC qualified for the 2027 FIFA Women's World Cup. Two more teams may qualify via the inter-confederation play-offs.

Team	Qualified on	Previous appearances in FIFA Women's World Cup (Note: Bold indicates champions for that year. Italic indicates hosts for that year.)
Australia	13 March 2026	8 (1995 (Note: Australia qualified as a member of the OFC in 1995, 1999 and 2003.), 1999, 2003, 2007, 2011, 2015, 2019, 2023)
China	14 March 2026	8 (1991, 1995, 1999, 2003, 2007, 2015, 2019, 2023)
South Korea	14 March 2026	4 (2003, 2015, 2019, 2023)
Japan	15 March 2026	9 (1991, 1995, 1999, 2003, 2007, **2011**, 2015, 2019, 2023)
Philippines	19 March 2026	1 (2023)
North Korea	19 March 2026	4 (1999, 2003, 2007, 2011)

== Broadcasting rights ==
Territory	Rights holder	Ref.
Africa	Azam TV	
Armenia	Start	
Azerbaijan	Start	
Belarus	Start	
Estonia	Start	
Latvia	Start	
Lithuania	Start	
Moldova	Start	
Russia	Start	
Ukraine	Start	
Australia	Paramount+; Network 10	
Austria	Sportdigital	
Germany	Sportdigital	
Switzerland	Sportdigital	
Bosnia and Herzegovina	Arena Sport	
Montenegro	Arena Sport	
North Macedonia	Arena Sport	
Serbia	Arena Sport	
Brunei	Astro	
Malaysia	Astro	
Bulgaria	Diema Sport	
Bulgaria	Nova Sport	
Caribbean	ESPN	
Latin America (inc. BRA and MEX)	ESPN	
Netherlands	ESPN	
China	CMG; iQIYI; Migu	
Croatia	Sport Klub	
Slovenia	Sport Klub	
Hong Kong	HOY TV	
India	FanCode	
Indonesia	MNC Media	
Israel	Sport5	
Japan	DAZN	
Kazakhstan	Q Sport	
Macau	Mplus; TDM	
MENA	beIN Sports; Al Kass	
Pacific Islands	Free-TV; Pasifika TV	
Philippines	One Sports	
South Asia (exc. IND)	tapmad	
South Korea	Coupang Play	
Taiwan	Sportcast	
Tajikistan	Varzish TV	
Thailand	BG Sports	
Turkey	D-Smart	
Uzbekistan	MTRK	
Vietnam	TV360; VTV; HTV	
Unsold markets	Youtube	

== Controversies ==
=== Threats towards the Iranian national team ===
In February 2026, after a number of players resigned from the Iran women's national football team and refereeing organization following the massacres in the country, the Iranian Football Federation reportedly threatened them with multi-year bans from professional football activities, judicial action, and long prison sentences. In March 2026, after the Iran women's national football team players refused to sing the national anthem of the Islamic Republic as a form of silent protest ahead of their Women's Asian Cup opener against South Korea, concerns grew for their safety following threats from Iranian state media. Ahead of the following match against Australia, the national team players were reportedly forced to sing the national anthem of the Islamic Republic of Iran, with threats to the players' family members if they did not. After the team's exit from the tournament on 8 March, members of the team gave what appeared to be SOS hand signals from the bus as they were leaving, leading to protests and growing calls for Australia to offer the team refuge after the players were accused of being wartime traitors by Iranian state media for not singing the national anthem of the Islamic Republic in their opening game amid the Iran war.

On 9 March, five members of the Iranian women’s national football team – Fatemeh Pasandideh, Zahra Ghanbari, Zahra Sarbali, Atefeh Ramezanizadeh, and Mona Hamoudi – left the team’s training camp in Australia and sought refuge due to fears of retaliation from Iranian authorities. On 10 March, US president Donald Trump publicly urged the Australian government to grant asylum to the players, stating they could face persecution if they returned to Iran. It was reported that the women had been helped to escape by the Australian Federal Police around 1:30 am, and had been granted humanitarian visas to stay in Australia. Home Affairs Minister Tony Burke had been working with the AFP on the issue for some time, and Prime Minister Anthony Albanese said that the team were safe in Australia.

=== Removal of Chen Kuei-jen ===
Former Chinese Taipei national football team coach Chen Kuei-jen was removed during the match between the Chinese Taipei and India in Sydney for leading fans to chant "Taiwan Jiayou" ("Go Taiwan"), after refusing to follow officials who ordered him to only use Chinese Taipei as the use of Taiwan was considered "political". Despite this, following Chinese Taipei's victory, Chen continued the Taiwan chant with the players on their bus. Following this incident, Taiwanese politician Lee Po-yi stated that he would contact the Ministry of Sports and the Australia's Taipei representative office to demand an explanation from the organisers. Chinese Taipei has been the name used since 1979 to represent Taiwan following the Nagoya Resolution to prevent sporting conflict with China, but the name has become controversial in Taiwan as many citizens have voiced support for being internationally recognised as Taiwan.

== See also ==
- 2027 FIFA Women's World Cup qualification
- 2028 AFC Women's Olympic Qualifying Tournament
- 2026 AFC U-20 Women's Asian Cup
- 2026 AFC U-17 Women's Asian Cup
