= Olga Kakharova =

Uzbekistani footballer

Personal information
- Position: Goalkeeper

International career^{‡}
Years	Team	Apps	(Gls)
2009	Uzbekistan	2	(0)
- ‡ National team caps and goals as of 3 May 2009

Olga Kakharova is an Uzbekistani former footballer who played as a goalkeeper. She has been a member of the Uzbekistan women's national team.

== International career ==
Kakharova capped for Uzbekistan at senior level during the 2010 AFC Women's Asian Cup qualification.

== See also ==
- List of Uzbekistan women's international footballers
