= Elena Belova (footballer) =

Uzbekistani footballer

Personal information
- Date of birth: 6 May 1985 (age 41)
- Position: Goalkeeper

International career^{‡}
Years	Team	Apps	(Gls)
2009	Uzbekistan	2	(0)

Managerial career
- 2018: Sevinch Women (goalkeeping coach)
- ‡ National team caps and goals as of 29 April 2009

Elena Belova (Uzbek: Yelena Belova; born 6 May 1985) is an Uzbekistani football goalkeeping coach and a former footballer who played as a goalkeeper. She has been a member of the Uzbekistan women's national team.

== International career ==
Belova capped for Uzbekistan at senior level during the 2010 AFC Women's Asian Cup qualification.

== See also ==
- List of Uzbekistan women's international footballers
