= Maluda Munavarova =

Uzbekistani footballer

Personal information
- Position: Midfielder

International career^{‡}
Years	Team	Apps	(Gls)
2009	Uzbekistan	2	(0)
- ‡ National team caps and goals as of 6 July 2009

Maluda Munavarova is an Uzbekistani former footballer who played as a midfielder. She has been a member of the Uzbekistan women's national team.

== International career ==
Munavarova capped for Uzbekistan at senior level during the 2010 AFC Women's Asian Cup qualification.

== See also ==
- List of Uzbekistan women's international footballers
