= Sadokat Ruzieva =

Uzbekistani footballer

Personal information
- Full name: Sadokat Ruzieva
- Date of birth: 1984 (age 41–42)
- Place of birth: Yakkabog, Soviet Union (now Uzbekistan)
- Position: Defender

Senior career*
Years	Team	Apps	(Gls)
- Sevinch
- Sho'rtan

International career^{‡}
2009–2013	Uzbekistan	8	(0)
- * Club domestic league appearances and goals ‡ National team caps and goals as of 9 June 2013

Sadokat Ruzieva (Uzbek: Sadoqat Ro'zieva; born 1984) is an Uzbekistani footballer who plays as a defender. She has been a member of the Uzbekistan women's national team.

== Early life ==
Ruzieva was born in Yakkabog, Qashqadaryo Region.

== Club career ==
Ruzieva has played for PFK Sevinch and for Sho'rtan.

== International career ==
Ruzieva capped for Uzbekistan at senior level during two AFC Women's Asian Cup qualifiers (2010 and 2014). She was also a part of the team that competed at the 2012 AFC Women's Olympic Qualifying Tournament.

== See also ==
- List of Uzbekistan women's international footballers
