= Laylo Tilovova =

Uzbekistani footballer

Personal information
- Full name: Laylo Kholmumin qizi Tilovova
- Date of birth: 8 March 1997 (age 29)
- Place of birth: Kamashi, Uzbekistan
- Position: Goalkeeper

Team information
- Current team: Sevinch

Senior career*
Years	Team	Apps	(Gls)
- Sevinch

International career^{‡}
2017–	Uzbekistan	6	(0)
- * Club domestic league appearances and goals ‡ National team caps and goals as of 9 April 2019

Laylo Tilovova (born 8 March 1997) is an Uzbekistani footballer who plays as a goalkeeper for Women's Championship club Sevinch and the Uzbekistan women's national team.

She began playing football at the age of 10.

== See also ==
- List of Uzbekistan women's international footballers
