= Chen Qiaozhu =

Chinese association football player

Personal information
- Date of birth: 8 September 1999 (age 27)
- Height: 1.67 m (5 ft 6 in)
- Position: Defender

Team information
- Current team: Meizhou Hakka

Chen Qiaozhu (Chinese: 陈巧珠; pinyin: Chén Qiǎozhū; born 8 September 1999) is a Chinese professional association football player who plays for Meizhou Hakka in the Chinese Women's Super League.

She plays internationally for the China national team, being part of the squad in the 2020 Summer Olympics and the 2023 World Cup.

== International goals ==
No.	Date	Venue	Opponent	Score	Result	Competition
1.	28 September 2023	Linping Sports Center Stadium, Hangzhou, China	Uzbekistan	4–0	6–0	2022 Asian Games
2.	6 October 2023	Yellow Dragon Sports Center, Hangzhou, China	Uzbekistan	2–0	7–0	2022 Asian Games
3.	6 October 2023	Yellow Dragon Sports Center, Hangzhou, China	Uzbekistan	5–0	7–0	2022 Asian Games
4.	29 October 2023	Xiamen Egret Stadium, Xiamen, China	Thailand	2–0	3–0	2024 AFC Women's Olympic Qualifying Tournament
5.	26 October 2024	Yongchuan Sports Center, Yongchuan, China	Uzbekistan	2–0	3–0	2024 Yongchuan International Tournament
6.	9 March 2026	Western Sydney Stadium, Sydney, Australia	North Korea	1–1	2–1	2026 AFC Women's Asian Cup
7.	14 September 2026	Gifu Nagaragawa Stadium, Gifu, Japan	Hong Kong	1–0	5–1	2026 Asian Games
8.	21 September 2026	Gifu Nagaragawa Stadium, Gifu, Japan	Philippines	3–0	5–1	2026 Asian Games
