= China women's national football team =

Women's national association football team

China
- Nickname(s): 铿锵玫瑰 Kēngqiāng Méiguī (Steel Roses)
- Association: Chinese Football Association
- Confederation: AFC (Asia)
- Sub-confederation: EAFF (East Asia)
- Head coach: Chang Weiwei
- Captain: Wu Haiyan
- Most caps: Zhang Rui (177)
- Top scorer: Sun Wen (89)
- FIFA code: CHN
First colours	Second colours

FIFA ranking
- Current: 16 (16 June 2026)
- Highest: 4 (July–August 2003)
- Lowest: 19 (August 2012; December 2021; December 2023 – June 2024)

First international
- United States 2–1 China (Jesolo, Italy; 20 July 1986)

Biggest win
- China 21–0 Philippines (Kota Kinabalu, Malaysia; 24 September 1995)

Biggest defeat
- Germany 8–0 China (Patras, Greece; 11 August 2004); England 8–0 China (London, England; 29 November 2025)

World Cup
- Appearances: 9 (first in 1991)
- Best result: Runners-up (1999)

Asian Cup
- Appearances: 14 (first in 1986)
- Best result: Winners (1986, 1989, 1991, 1993, 1995, 1997, 1999, 2006, 2022)
Medal record
FIFA World Cup
Silver medal – second place	1999 United States	1999 FIFA Women's World Cup
Summer Olympics
Silver medal – second place	1996 Atlanta	Football at the 1996 Summer Olympics – Women's tournament
Asian Cup
Gold medal – first place	1986 Hong Kong
Gold medal – first place	1989 Hong Kong
Gold medal – first place	1991 Japan
Gold medal – first place	1993 Malaysia
Gold medal – first place	1995 Malaysia
Gold medal – first place	1997 China
Gold medal – first place	1999 Philippines
Gold medal – first place	2006 Australia
Gold medal – first place	2022 India	Team
Silver medal – second place	2003 Thailand
Silver medal – second place	2008 Vietnam
Asian Games
Gold medal – first place	1990 Beijing	Football at the 1990 Asian Games
Gold medal – first place	1994 Hiroshima	Football at the 1994 Asian Games
Gold medal – first place	1998 Bangkok	Football at the 1998 Asian Games
Silver medal – second place	2002 Busan	Football at the 2002 Asian Games
Silver medal – second place	2018 Jakarta	Football at the 2018 Asian Games
Bronze medal – third place	2006 Doha	Football at the 2006 Asian Games
Bronze medal – third place	2022 Hangzhou	Football at the 2022 Asian Games
CONCACAF W Championship
Bronze medal – third place	2000 Canada	Team

China women's national football team (Chinese: 中国国家女子足球队; pinyin: Zhōngguó Guójiā Nǚzǐ Zúqiú Duì, recognized as China PR by FIFA) represents the People's Republic of China in international women's football competitions and is governed by the Chinese Football Association.

China women's team won silver medals at the 1996 Summer Olympics and the 1999 FIFA Women's World Cup. It also has won nine titles at Asian Cup and three Gold medals at Asian Games.

Nicknamed the Steel Roses (Chinese: 铿锵玫瑰), they won several international titles in the 1990s, during the Golden Generation. The team lost some pace in the continent to the national teams of Japan and Australia after the start of the 21st century although in 2023, the team was ranked as the 15th best in the world and also won the ninth AFC Asian Cup in their history, the first since 2006.

== Results and fixtures ==
The following is a list of match results in the last 12 months, as well as any future matches that have been scheduled.

Legend

Win Draw Loss Fixture

=== 2025 ===
29 November Friendly	England	8–0	China	London, England
17:30	Mead 12', 14'; Hemp 16'; Stanway 23', 38' (pen.), 52'; Toone 71'; Russo 78'	Report		Stadium: Wembley Stadium; Attendance: 74,611; Referee: Ionela Peşu (Romania)

2 December ShePlays Tournament	Scotland	3–2	China	Jerez de la Frontera, Spain
19:00 UTC+1	(Kirsty Howat), 10', (Kirsty Hanson), 14', (Kirsty Howat), 15'		(Zhang Linyan), 30', (Wu Chengshu), 60'	Stadium: Estadio Municipal de Chapín

=== 2026 ===
10 February Friendly	China	2–0	Vietnam	Shenzhen, China
--:-- UTC+8		Report		Stadium: Shenzhen Youth Football Training Base

13 February Friendly	China	6–1	Vietnam	Shenzhen, China
--:-- UTC+8				Stadium: Shenzhen Youth Football Training Base

3 March 2026 Asian Cup GS	China	2–0	Bangladesh	Sydney, Australia
19:00 UTC+11				Stadium: Western Sydney Stadium; Attendance: 6,006; Referee: Pansa Chaisanit (Thailand)

6 March 2026 Asian Cup GS	Uzbekistan	0–3	China	Sydney, Australia
19:00 UTC+11				Stadium: Western Sydney Stadium; Attendance: 8,322; Referee: Supiree Testhomya (Thailand)

9 March 2026 Asian Cup GS	North Korea	1–2	China	Sydney, Australia
20:00 UTC+11				Stadium: Western Sydney Stadium; Attendance: 9,093; Referee: Lê Thị Ly (Vietnam)

14 March 2026 Asian Cup QF	China	2–0 (a.e.t.)	Chinese Taipei	Perth, Australia
13:00 UTC+8				Stadium: Perth Rectangular Stadium; Referee: Oh Hyeon-jeong (South Korea)

17 March 2026 Asian Cup SF	China	1–2	Australia	Perth, Australia
18:00 UTC+8				Stadium: Perth Stadium; Referee: Supiree Testhomya (Thailand)

3 June Friendly	China	1–2	Russia	Wuhan, China
19:35 UTC+8				Stadium: Wuhan Five Rings Sports Center

7 June Friendly	China	0–1	Russia	Wuhan, China
19:00 UTC+8				Stadium: Wuhan Tazihu Football Training Center

9 September Friendly	China	3–0	Vietnam	Suzhou, China
--:-- UTC+8		Report

14 September 2026 Asian Games GS	China	5–1	Hong Kong	Gifu, Japan
19:00 UTC+9	Chen Qiaozhu 14'; Si Yu 38'; Wang Yanwen 48'; Wang Shuang 80', 89'	Report	Cheung Wai Ki 31'	Stadium: Gifu Nagaragawa Stadium; Attendance: 179; Referee: Khin Nyein Chan (Myanmar)

17 September 2026 Asian Games GS	Uzbekistan	1–1	China	Gifu, Japan
14:00 UTC+9	Dadaboeva 42'	Report	Zhang Linyan 70'	Stadium: Gifu Nagaragawa Stadium; Attendance: 226; Referee: Azusa Sugino (Japan)

21 September 2026 Asian Games GS	China	5–1	Philippines	Gifu, Japan
16:00 UTC+9	Wang Yanwen 20', 40', 54'; Chen Qiaozhu 49'; Yuan Cong 90+2'	Report	Leach 65'	Stadium: Gifu Nagaragawa Stadium; Attendance: 1,022; Referee: Esraa Almbaiden (Jordan)

25 September 2026 Asian Games QF	China	1–0 (a.e.t.)	Vietnam	Osaka, Japan
15:00 UTC+9	Wang Shuang 109'	Report		Stadium: Nagai Stadium; Attendance: 252; Referee: Azusa Sugino (Japan)

29 September 2026 Asian Games SF	North Korea	2–0	China	Fukuroi, Japan
15:00 UTC+9		Report		Stadium: Shizuoka Stadium; Attendance: 564; Referee: Veronika Bernatskaia (Kyrgyzstan)

2 October 2026 Asian Games BM	China	0–1	South Korea	Fukuroi, Japan
15:00 UTC+9		Report		Stadium: Shizuoka Stadium; Attendance: 1,331; Referee: Rawdha Al-Mansoori (United Arab Emirates)

28 November Yongchuan International Tournament	China	–	Thailand	Chongqing, China
19:35 UTC+8				Stadium: Yongchuan Sports Center

1 December Yongchuan International Tournament	China	–	Albania	Chongqing, China
19:35 UTC+8				Stadium: Yongchuan Sports Center

4 December Yongchuan International Tournament	China	–	Malawi	Chongqing, China
19:35 UTC+8				Stadium: Yongchuan Sports Center

=== 2027 ===
19 April 2028 AFC Women's Olympic Qualifying Tournament	China	–	South Korea	China
:

24 April 2028 AFC Women's Olympic Qualifying Tournament	Philippines	–	China	Philippines
:

7 October 2028 AFC Women's Olympic Qualifying Tournament	North Korea	–	China
:

12 October 2028 AFC Women's Olympic Qualifying Tournament	China	–	North Korea	China
:

29 November 2028 AFC Women's Olympic Qualifying Tournament	South Korea	–	China	South Korea
:

4 December 2028 AFC Women's Olympic Qualifying Tournament	China	–	Philippines	China
:

- Fixtures and Results on TheCFA
- "Fixtures and Results". Soccerway.

== Head-to-head record ==
As of 2 October 2026, after the match against the South Korea.

counted for the FIFA A-level matches only.

Against	First Played	P	W	D	L	GF	GA	GD	Confederation
Argentina	2007	5	3	1	1	9	1	+8	CONMEBOL
Australia	1988	45	19	13	15	74	56	+18	AFC
Bangladesh	2026	1	1	0	0	2	0	+2	AFC
Brazil	1986	13	1	6	6	9	27	−18	CONMEBOL
Cameroon	2015	2	2	0	0	2	0	+2	CAF
Canada	1987	29	14	6	9	51	29	+22	CONCACAF
Chile	2009	2	1	0	1	2	1	+1	CONMEBOL
Chinese Taipei	1989	23	23	0	0	70	2	+68	AFC
Colombia	2018	1	1	0	0	2	0	+2	CONMEBOL
Costa Rica	2016	2	1	1	0	3	2	+1	CONCACAF
Croatia	2017	2	2	0	0	4	1	+3	UEFA
Czech Republic	2004	1	1	0	0	1	0	+1	UEFA
Denmark	1991	18	10	4	4	32	15	+17	UEFA
England	2005	7	3	1	3	7	17	−10	UEFA
Finland	1989	16	13	2	1	43	8	+35	UEFA
France	1990	11	4	3	4	12	12	0	UEFA
Germany	1991	31	8	6	17	30	56	−26	UEFA
Ghana	1999	4	4	0	0	12	2	+10	CAF
Guam	1999	2	2	0	0	24	0	+24	AFC
Guatemala	2000	1	1	0	0	14	0	+14	CONCACAF
Haiti	2023	1	1	0	0	1	0	+1	CONCACAF
Hong Kong	1989	11	11	0	0	85	1	+84	AFC
Hungary	2007	1	1	0	0	4	0	+4	UEFA
Iceland	2007	8	2	1	5	8	13	−5	UEFA
India	1998	2	2	0	0	28	0	+28	AFC
Indonesia	1986	1	1	0	0	9	0	+9	AFC
Iran	2022	1	1	0	0	7	0	+7	AFC
Italy	1986	8	2	2	4	6	10	−4	UEFA
Ivory Coast	1988	1	1	0	0	8	1	+7	CAF
Japan	1986	42	16	9	17	55	42	+13	AFC
Jordan	2006	4	4	0	0	35	2	+33	AFC
Kazakhstan	1995	2	2	0	0	16	0	+16	UEFA
North Korea	1989	39	12	8	19	39	43	−4	AFC
South Korea	1990	46	31	9	7	111	33	+78	AFC
Malaysia	1986	2	2	0	0	17	0	+17	AFC
Mexico	2000	12	8	3	2	17	8	+9	CONCACAF
Mongolia	2018	2	2	0	0	26	0	+26	AFC
Myanmar	2004	3	3	0	0	16	0	+16	AFC
Netherlands	1988	15	6	5	4	19	23	−4	UEFA
New Zealand	1991	18	14	1	3	44	12	+32	OFC
Nigeria	1999	7	4	1	2	16	10	+6	CAF
Norway	1987	28	9	3	16	30	40	−10	UEFA
Philippines	1995	5	5	0	0	55	1	+54	AFC
Portugal	1996	8	4	3	1	18	7	+11	UEFA
Republic of Ireland	2023	1	0	1	0	0	0	0	UEFA
Romania	1991	1	1	0	0	3	1	+2	UEFA
Russia	1991	16	11	2	3	24	11	+13	UEFA
Scotland	2003	3	2	0	1	7	3	+4	UEFA
Serbia	1989	1	1	0	0	6	1	+5	UEFA
South Africa	2003	5	5	0	0	29	0	+29	CAF
Spain	2015	4	0	1	3	2	8	−6	UEFA
Sweden	1987	27	7	9	11	25	36	−11	UEFA
Switzerland	2009	2	1	1	0	2	0	+2	UEFA
Tajikistan	2018	1	1	0	0	16	0	+16	AFC
Thailand	1989	20	19	1	0	85	9	+76	AFC
United States	1986	61	9	13	39	38	107	−69	CONCACAF
Ukraine	2017	1	1	0	0	5	0	+5	UEFA
Uzbekistan	1997	10	9	1	0	59	2	+57	AFC
Vietnam	2002	16	16	0	0	56	3	+53	AFC
Wales	2011	1	1	0	0	2	1	+1	UEFA
Zambia	2021	1	0	1	0	4	4	0	CAF
Zimbabwe	2016	1	1	0	0	3	0	+3	CAF
Total (61)	1986	655	342	118	195	1426	649	+777	All

== Coaching staff ==
=== Current coaching staff ===
As of 28 February 2024

Position	Name
Team Manager	(China) Chen Yingbiao
Team Manager	(China) Zheng Chaoyong
Head coach	(China) Chang Weiwei
Assistant coach	(China) Liu Lin
Assistant coach	(China) Cheng Xiaoyu
Assistant coach	(China) Liu Jianjiang
Assistant coach	(China) Zhang Jun
Video Analyst	(China) Liu Bin
Video Analyst	(China) Cheng Liang
Video Analyst	(China) Ji Xinyi
Physiotherapist	(China) Mu Yunrui
Physiotherapist	(China) Chang Lele
Physiotherapist	(China) Zhang Baoju
Physiotherapist	(China) Yang Shuai
Doctor	(China) Yi Qing
Kit-Manager	(China) Hou Shisheng
Nutrition	(China) Mai Ruichao

=== Manager history ===
- (China) Cong Zheyu (1986–1988)
- (China) Shang Ruihua (1988–1991)
- (China) Ma Yuanan (1991–2001)
- (China) Ma Liangxing (2002–2003)
- (China) Zhang Haitao (2003–2004)
- (China) Wang Haiming (2004–2005, 2007; caretaker)
- (China) Pei Encai (2005)
- (China) Ma Liangxing (2005–2006)
- (Sweden) Marika Domanski-Lyfors (2007)
- (France) Élisabeth Loisel (2007–2008)
- (China) Shang Ruihua (2008–2010)
- (China) Li Xiaopeng (2011–2012)
- (China) Hao Wei (2012–2015)
- (France) Bruno Bini (2015–2017)
- (Iceland) Sigurður Ragnar Eyjólfsson (2017–2018)
- (China) Jia Xiuquan (2018–2021)
- (China) Shui Qingxia (2021–2023)
- (China) Wang Jun (2023; caretaker)
- (Australia) Ante Milicic (2024–2026)
- (China) Chang Weiwei (2026–)

== Players ==
=== Current squad ===
The following players were called up for the friendly matches against Russia on 3 and 7 June 2026.

Caps and goals correct as of 7 June 2026, after the match against Russia.

No.	Pos.	Player	Date of birth (age)	Caps	Goals	Club
1	GK	Pan Hongyan	30 December 2004 (age 21)	7	0	(Chinese Football Association) Beijing
12	GK	Xiao Zitong	27 March 2002 (age 24)	1	0	(Chinese Football Association) Shanghai
22	GK	Liu Chen	30 December 2004 (age 21)	0	0	(Chinese Football Association) Beijing
3	DF	Chen Qiaozhu	8 September 1999 (age 27)	38	6	(Chinese Football Association) Beijing
4	DF	Wang Linlin	4 August 2000 (age 26)	30	2	(Chinese Football Association) Shanghai
5	DF	Wu Haiyan	26 February 1993 (age 33)	150	2	(Chinese Football Association) Wuhan Jiangda
6	DF	Yu Fan	4 July 2000 (age 26)	0	0	(Chinese Football Association) Beijing
20	DF	Zhang Chengxue	2 December 1995 (age 30)	6	0	(Chinese Football Association) Sichuan
21	DF	Deng Mengye	25 December 2001 (age 24)	2	0	(Chinese Football Association) Wuhan Jiangda
24	DF	Yan Qi	4 October 1999 (age 27)	0	0	(Chinese Football Association) Wuhan Jiangda
25	DF	Ye Tong	5 October 2006 (age 20)	1	0	(Chinese Football Association) Liaoning
8	MF	Yao Wei	1 September 1997 (age 29)	61	5	(Chinese Football Association) Wuhan Jiangda
10	MF	Wang Yanwen	27 March 1999 (age 27)	31	4	(French Football Federation) Dijon
14	MF	Li Qingtong	14 April 1999 (age 27)	9	2	(Chinese Football Association) Beijing
15	MF	Wang Aifang	15 January 2006 (age 20)	12	1	(Chinese Football Association) Liaoning
16	MF	Liu Jing	28 April 1998 (age 28)	22	1	(Chinese Football Association) Changchun Dazhong Zhuoyue
17	MF	Xie Zongmei	26 April 2006 (age 20)	3	0	(Chinese Football Association) Liaoning
18	MF	Huo Yuexin	8 March 2005 (age 21)	12	0	(Chinese Football Association) Jiangsu
19	MF	Zhang Linyan	16 January 2001 (age 25)	38	6	(Chinese Football Association) Beijing
7	FW	Wang Shuang	23 January 1995 (age 31)	135	49	(Chinese Football Association) Wuhan Jiangda
9	FW	Wurigumula	26 August 1996 (age 30)	21	4	(French Football Federation) Montpellier
13	FW	Jin Kun	4 October 1999 (age 27)	26	3	(Chinese Football Association) Changchun Dazhong Zhuoyue
23	FW	Shao Ziqin	24 February 2003 (age 23)	18	10	(Portuguese Football Federation) Benfica

=== Recent call-ups ===
The following players have also been called up to the squad within the past 12 months.

Pos.	Player	Date of birth (age)	Caps	Goals	Club	Latest call-up
GK	Peng Shimeng	12 May 1998 (age 28)	32	0	(China) Guangdong	2026 AFC Women's Asian Cup
GK	Zhu Yu	23 July 1997 (age 29)	19	0	(China) Shanghai	2026 AFC Women's Asian Cup
DF	Chen Chen	26 June 1993 (age 33)	3	0	(China) Wuhan Jiangda	2026 AFC Women's Asian Cup
GK	Zhu Mengdi	25 January 2000 (age 26)	0	0	(China) Shaanxi	v. Scotland, 3 December 2025
DF	Li Mengwen	28 March 1995 (age 31)	43	2	(China) Meizhou Hakka	2026 AFC Women's Asian Cup
DF	Wang Ying	18 November 1997 (age 28)	5	0	(Australia) WS Wanderers	2026 AFC Women's Asian Cup
DF	Lu Yatong	4 November 1996 (age 30)	1	0	(China) Shandong	2026 AFC Women's Asian Cup
DF	Dou Jiaxing	29 February 2000 (age 26)	19	0	(China) Jiangsu	v. Scotland, 3 December 2025
DF	Liu Yanqiu	31 December 1995 (age 30)	14	1	(China) Wuhan Jiangda	v. Scotland, 3 December 2025
MF	Zhang Rui	17 January 1989 (age 37)	177	22	(China) Shandong	2026 AFC Women's Asian Cup
MF	Zhang Xin	23 May 1992 (age 34)	51	9	(China) Shanghai	2026 AFC Women's Asian Cup
MF	Shen Mengyu	19 August 2001 (age 25)	20	3		v. Scotland, 3 December 2025
MF	Zhao Yujie	28 April 1999 (age 27)	1	0	(China) Beijing	v. Scotland, 3 December 2025
FW	Tang Jiali	16 March 1995 (age 31)	77	13	(China) Shanghai	2026 AFC Women's Asian Cup
FW	Wu Chengshu	26 August 1996 (age 30)	27	2	(China) Butterfly	2026 AFC Women's Asian Cup
FW	Yuan Cong	17 April 2000 (age 26)	9	0	(China) Guangdong	2026 AFC Women's Asian Cup
FW	Sun Fangxin	6 July 2003 (age 23)	6	0	(China) Shandong	v. Scotland, 3 December 2025
Notes: ^{INJ} = Withdrew due to injury; ^{PRE} = Preliminary squad; ^{RET} = Retired from the national team

== Records ==
As of 2 October 2026

Players in bold are still active with the national team.

=== Most appearances ===
Rank	Player	Career	Caps	Goals
1	**Zhang Rui**	2009–present	182	22
2	Pu Wei	1998–2014	170	26
3	Han Duan	2000–2011	167	77
4	Wang Shanshan	2012–2023	163	62
5	Bi Yan	2003–2010	158	21
6	**Wu Haiyan**	2012–present	156	2
7	Li Jie	1997–2008	153	19
8	**Wang Shuang**	2013–present	141	52
9	Zhao Lihong	1992–2004	130	32
10	Sun Wen	1990–2005	126	89
10	Gu Yasha	2008–2023	126	14

=== Top goalscorers ===
Rank	Player	Career	Goals	Caps	Avg.
1	Sun Wen	1990–2005	89	126	0.71
2	Han Duan	2000–2011	77	167	0.46
3	Wang Shanshan	2012–2023	62	163	0.38
4	Niu Lijie	1987–2000	51	53	0.96
4	Liu Ailing	1987–2000	51	111	0.46
6	**Wang Shuang**	2013–present	52	141	0.37
7	Jin Yan	1996–2002	41	74	0.55
8	Zhang Ouying	1998–2007	40	111	0.36
9	Sun Qingmei	1984–1997	37	75	0.49
10	Liu Ying	1993–2005	35	97	0.36

== Honours ==
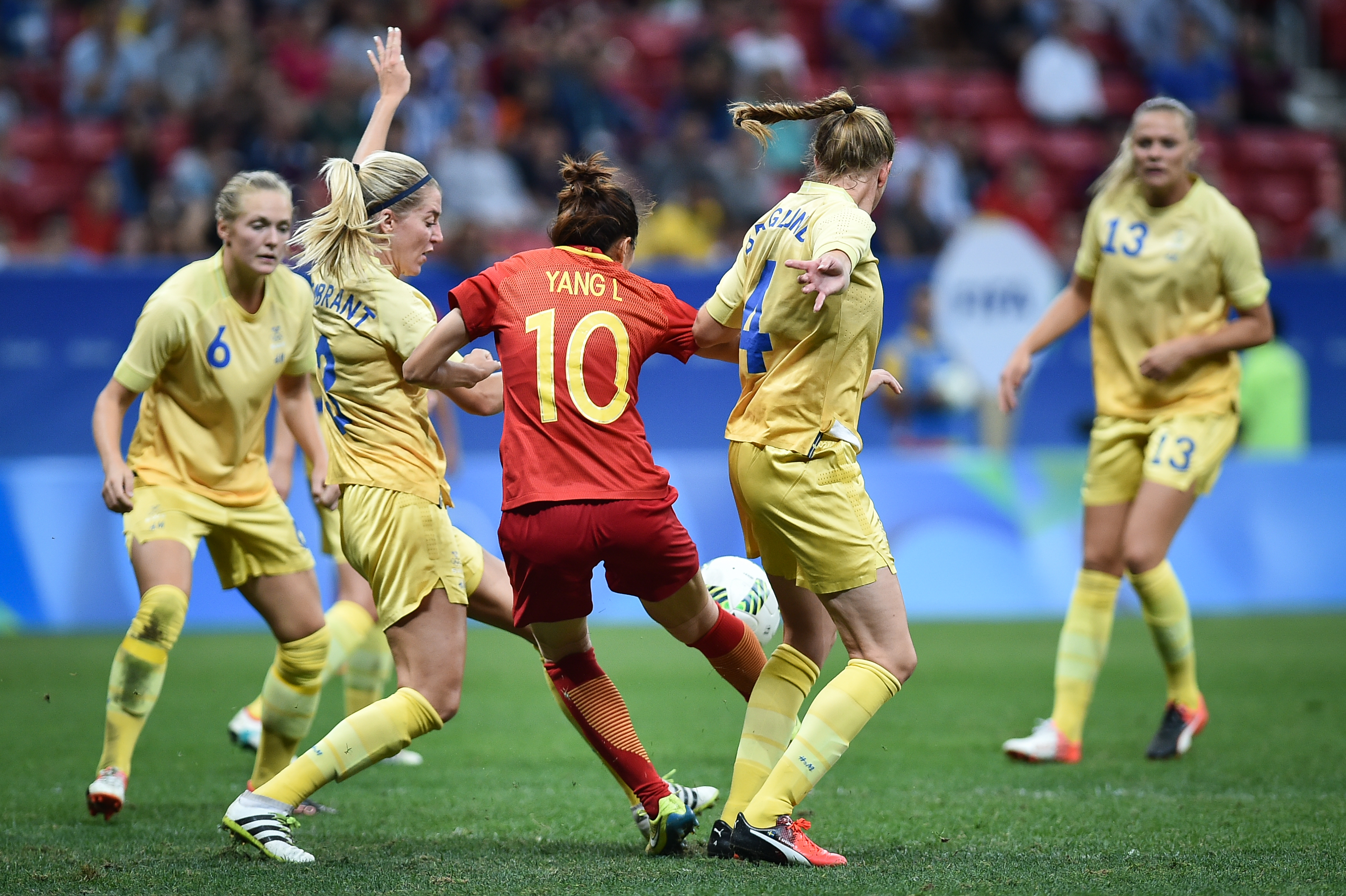
China vs Sweden 2016 Olympic

=== Major competitions ===
- FIFA Women's World Cup

Runners-up: 1999

- Olympic Games

Runners-up: 1996

- AFC Women's Asian Cup

Winners: 1986, 1989, 1991, 1993, 1995, 1997, 1999, 2006, 2022
Runners-up: 2003, 2008

- CONCACAF W Championship

Third place: 2000

=== Continental ===
- Asian Games^{1}

Winners: 1990, 1994, 1998
Runners-up: 2002, 2018

=== Regional ===
- EAFF Women's Football Championship

Runners-up: 2010, 2022

=== Friendly ===
- Albena Cup

Winners: 1990

- Algarve Cup

Winners: 1999, 2002
Runners-up: 1997, 2003

- Four Nations Tournament

Winners: 2005, 2009, 2014, 2016, 2017, 2018, 2019

- Yongchuan International Tournament

Winners: 2015, 2016, 2018, 2019

Notes

1. Competition organized by the OCA, officially not recognized by FIFA.

== Competitive record ==
Champions Runners-up Third place Fourth place

=== FIFA Women's World Cup ===
FIFA Women's World Cup record
Year	Result	M	W	D	L	GF	GA	GD
(China) 1991	Quarter-finals	4	2	1	1	10	4	+6
(Sweden) 1995	Fourth place	6	2	2	2	11	10	+1
(United States) 1999	Runners-up	6	5	1	0	19	2	+17
(United States) 2003	Quarter-finals	4	2	1	1	3	2	+1
(China) 2007	Quarter-finals	4	2	0	2	5	7	−2
(Germany) 2011	Did not qualify							
(Canada) 2015	Quarter-finals	5	2	1	2	4	4	0
(France) 2019	Round of 16	4	1	1	2	1	3	−2
(Australia) (New Zealand) 2023	Group stage	3	1	0	2	2	7	−5
(Brazil) 2027	Qualified							
(Costa Rica) (Jamaica) (Mexico) (United States) 2031	To be determined							
(United Kingdom) 2035	To be determined							
Total	9/12	36	17	7	12	55	39	+16

FIFA Women's World Cup history
Year	Round	Date	Opponent	Result	Stadium
(China) 1991	Group stage	16 November	Norway	W 4–0	Tianhe Stadium, Guangzhou
(China) 1991	Group stage	19 November	Denmark	D 2–2	Guangdong Provincial Stadium, Guangzhou
(China) 1991	Group stage	21 November	New Zealand	W 4–1	New Plaza Stadium, Foshan
(China) 1991	Quarter-finals	24 November	Sweden	L 0–1	Tianhe Stadium, Guangzhou
(Sweden) 1995	Group stage	6 June	United States	D 3–3	Strömvallen, Gävle
(Sweden) 1995	Group stage	8 June	Australia	W 4–2	Arosvallen, Västerås
(Sweden) 1995	Group stage	10 June	Denmark	W 3–1	Arosvallen, Västerås
(Sweden) 1995	Quarter-finals	13 June	Sweden	D 1–1 (4–3 pen)	Olympia Stadion, Helsingborg
(Sweden) 1995	Semi-finals	15 June	Germany	L 0–1	Olympia Stadion, Helsingborg
(Sweden) 1995	Third place play-off	17 June	United States	L 0–2	Strömvallen, Gävle
(United States) 1999	Group stage	19 June	Sweden	W 2–1	Spartan Stadium, San Jose
(United States) 1999	Group stage	23 June	Ghana	W 7–0	Civic Stadium, Portland
(United States) 1999	Group stage	26 June	Australia	W 3–1	Giants Stadium, East Rutherford
(United States) 1999	Quarter-finals	30 June	Russia	W 2–0	Spartan Stadium, San Jose
(United States) 1999	Semi-finals	4 July	Norway	W 5–0	Foxboro Stadium, Foxborough
(United States) 1999	Final	17 June	United States	D 0–0 (4–5 pen)	Rose Bowl, Pasadena
(United States) 2003	Group stage	21 September	Ghana	W 1–0	The Home Depot Center, Carson
(United States) 2003	Group stage	25 September	Australia	D 1–1	The Home Depot Center, Carson
(United States) 2003	Group stage	28 September	Russia	W 1–0	PGE Park, Portland
(United States) 2003	Quarter-finals	2 October	Canada	L 0–1	PGE Park, Portland
(China) 2007	Group stage	12 September	Denmark	W 3–2	Wuhan Stadium, Wuhan
(China) 2007	Group stage	15 September	Brazil	L 0–4	Wuhan Stadium, Wuhan
(China) 2007	Group stage	20 September	New Zealand	W 2–0	Tianjin Olympic Centre Stadium, Tianjin
(China) 2007	Quarter-finals	23 September	Norway	L 0–1	Wuhan Stadium, Wuhan
(Canada) 2015
(Canada) 2015	Group stage	6 June	Canada	L 0–1	Commonwealth Stadium, Edmonton
(Canada) 2015	Group stage	11 June	Netherlands	W 1–0	Commonwealth Stadium, Edmonton
(Canada) 2015	Group stage	15 June	New Zealand	D 2–2	Winnipeg Stadium, Winnipeg
(Canada) 2015	Round of 16	20 June	Cameroon	W 1–0	Commonwealth Stadium, Edmonton
(Canada) 2015	Quarter-finals	23 September	United States	L 0–1	Lansdowne Stadium, Ottawa
(France) 2019	Group stage	8 June	Germany	L 0–1	Roazhon Park, Rennes
(France) 2019	Group stage	13 June	South Africa	W 1–0	Parc des Princes, Paris
(France) 2019	Group stage	17 June	Spain	D 0–0	Stade Océane, Le Havre
(France) 2019	Round of 16	25 June	Italy	L 0–2	Stade de la Mosson, Montpellier
(Australia) (New Zealand) 2023	Group stage	22 July	Denmark	L 0–1	Perth Rectangular Stadium, Perth
(Australia) (New Zealand) 2023	Group stage	28 July	Haiti	W 1–0	Hindmarsh Stadium, Adelaide
(Australia) (New Zealand) 2023	Group stage	1 August	England	L 1–6	Hindmarsh Stadium, Adelaide

=== Olympic Games ===
Summer Olympics record
Year	Result	M	W	D	L	GF	GA	GD
(United States) 1996	Silver medal	5	3	1	1	11	5	+6
(Australia) 2000	Group stage	3	1	1	1	5	4	+1
(Greece) 2004	Group stage	2	0	1	1	1	9	−8
(China) 2008	Quarter-finals	4	2	1	1	5	4	+1
(United Kingdom) 2012	Did not qualify							
(Brazil) 2016	Quarter-finals	4	1	1	2	2	4	−2
(Japan) 2020	Group stage	3	0	1	2	6	17	−11
(France) 2024	Did not qualify							
(United States) 2028	To be determined							
(Australia) 2032	To be determined							
Total	6/10	21	7	6	8	30	43	−13

=== AFC Women's Asian Cup ===
AFC Women's Asian Cup									Qualification						
Year	Result	M	W	D	L	GF	GA	GD	M	W	D	L	GF	GA	GD
(Hong Kong) 1975	Did Not Enter								No Qualification						
(Taiwan) 1977	Did Not Enter								No Qualification						
(India) 1980	Did Not Enter								No Qualification						
(Hong Kong) 1981	Did Not Enter								No Qualification						
1983	Did Not Enter								No Qualification						
(Hong Kong) 1986	Champions	4	4	0	0	23	0	+23	No Qualification						
(Hong Kong) 1989	Champions	5	5	0	0	16	2	+14	No Qualification						
(Japan) 1991	Champions	5	5	0	0	29	1	+28	No Qualification						
(Malaysia) 1993	Champions	5	4	1	0	20	2	+18	No Qualification						
(Malaysia) 1995	Champions	5	5	0	0	46	0	+46	No Qualification						
(China) 1997	Champions	5	5	0	0	39	1	+38	No Qualification						
(Philippines) 1999	Champions	6	6	0	0	47	2	+45	No Qualification						
(Chinese Taipei) 2001	Third place	5	4	0	1	40	3	+37	No Qualification						
2003	Runners-up	5	4	0	1	33	3	+30	No Qualification						
(Australia) 2006	Champions	5	3	1	1	7	3	+4	Directly Qualified						
(Vietnam) 2008	Runners-up	5	3	0	2	10	5	+5	Directly Qualified						
(China) 2010	Fourth place	5	2	1	2	6	3	+3	Directly Qualified						
(Vietnam) 2014	Third place	5	3	1	1	13	3	+10	Directly Qualified						
(Jordan) 2018	Third place	5	4	0	1	19	5	+14	Directly Qualified						
(India) 2022	Champions	5	4	1	0	19	5	+14	Directly Qualified						
(Australia) 2026	Semi-finals	5	4	0	1	10	3	+7	Directly Qualified						
Total:15/20	9 Titles	80	65	5	10	377	41	+336	0	0	0	0	0	0	0

=== Asian Games ===
Asian Games record
Host	Result	M	W	D	L	GF	GA	GD
(China) 1990	Gold medalists	5	5	0	0	26	0	+26
(Japan) 1994	Gold medalists	4	3	1	0	10	1	+9
1998	Gold medalists	5	5	0	0	28	0	+28
(South Korea) 2002	Silver medalists	5	3	2	0	11	3	+8
(Qatar) 2006	Bronze medalists	5	3	0	2	22	4	+18
(China) 2010	Fourth place	5	2	1	2	11	4	+7
(South Korea) 2014	Quarter-finals	4	2	1	1	9	1	+8
(Indonesia) 2018	Silver medalists	6	5	0	1	31	1	+30
(China) 2022	Bronze medalists	5	4	0	1	36	4	+32
(Japan) 2026	Fourth place	6	3	1	2	12	6	+6
Total	10/10	50	35	6	9	196	24	+172

=== Minor tournaments ===
==== EAFF E-1 Football Championship ====
EAFF E-1 Football Championship record
Host	Result	M	W	D	L	GF	GA	GD
(South Korea) 2005	Fourth place	3	0	1	2	0	3	−3
(China) 2008	Third place	3	1	1	1	3	5	−2
(Japan) 2010	Runners-up	3	2	0	1	5	3	2
(South Korea) 2013	Fourth place	3	1	0	2	2	4	-2
(China) 2015	Fourth place	3	0	0	3	2	6	−4
(Japan) 2017	Third place	3	1	0	2	3	4	−1
(South Korea) 2019	Third place	3	1	1	1	1	3	-2
(Japan) 2022	Runners-up	3	1	2	0	3	1	2
(South Korea) 2025	Runners-up	3	1	2	0	6	4	2
Total	9/9	27	8	7	12	25	33	-8

==== Algarve Cup ====
(Portugal) Algarve Cup record
Year	Result	M	W	D	L	GF	GA	GD
1994	Did not enter							
1995	Did not enter							
1996	Third place	4	3	0	1	9	5	4
1997	Runners-up	4	3	0	1	6	1	5
1998	5th place	4	3	0	1	6	5	1
1999	Champions	4	4	0	0	10	1	9
2000	Third place	4	3	0	1	9	4	5
2001	Third place	4	3	0	1	11	3	8
2002	Champions	4	4	0	0	10	3	7
2003	Runners-up	4	2	1	1	5	3	2
2004	6th place	4	1	2	1	5	2	3
2005	7th place	4	0	1	3	1	6	−5
2006	6th place	4	1	1	2	6	2	4
2007	10th place	4	0	0	4	2	9	−7
2008	9th place	4	0	1	3	2	10	−8
2009	5th place	4	2	1	1	3	4	−1
2010	Fourth place	4	1	1	2	3	8	−5
2011	7th place	4	1	0	3	3	5	−2
2012	9th place	4	1	0	3	1	3	−2
2013	6th place	4	1	1	2	2	7	−5
2014	5th place	4	1	1	2	2	3	−1
2015	12th place	4	0	2	2	3	8	−5
2016	Did not enter							
2017	10th place	4	0	1	3	2	5	−3
2018	11th place	4	1	0	3	3	7	−4
2019	12th place	3	0	1	2	2	5	−3
2020	Did not enter							
2021	Cancelled because of the COVID-19 pandemic							
2022	Did not enter							
2023	Cancelled because of the 2023 FIFA Women's World Cup qualification							
Total	23/28	91	35	14	42	106	109	−3

==== Four Nations Tournament ====
(China) Four Nations Tournament record
Host	Result	M	W	D	L	GF	GA	GD
1998	Third place	3	1	1	1	5	3	+2
2002	Fourth place	3	1	0	2	2	6	−4
2003	Runners-up	3	1	2	0	3	1	+2
2004	Runners-up	3	1	2	0	4	3	+1
2005	Champions	3	2	0	1	6	3	+3
2006	Runners-up	3	1	1	1	4	4	0
2007	Runners-up	3	1	1	1	2	2	0
2008	Runners-up	3	1	1	1	2	1	+1
2009	Champions	3	3	0	0	8	0	+8
2011	Fourth place	3	1	0	2	4	6	−2
2012	Runners-up	3	1	2	0	1	0	+1
2013	Third place	3	1	0	2	2	2	0
2014	Champions	3	3	0	0	5	1	+4
2015	Fourth place	3	0	1	2	3	5	−2
2016	Champions	3	2	1	0	10	0	+10
2017	Champions	3	3	0	0	9	0	+9
2018	Champions	3	3	0	0	8	1	+7
2019	Champions	2	2	0	0	4	0	+4
Total	18/18	53	28	12	13	82	38	+44

==== Yongchuan International Tournament ====
(China) Yongchuan International Tournament record
Host	Result	M	W	D	L	GF	GA	GD
2015	Champions	2	1	1	0	3	2	+1
2016	Champions	3	2	1	0	7	3	+4
2017	Third place	3	1	1	1	6	6	0
2018	Champions	3	2	1	0	4	1	+3
2019	Champions	2	1	1	0	2	0	0
Total	5/5	13	7	5	1	22	12	+10

==== Pinatar Cup ====
(Spain) Pinatar Cup record
Host	Result	M	W	D	L	GF	GA	GD
2025	Third place	3	1	0	2	5	3	+2
Total	1/1	3	1	0	2	5	3	+2

==== Unofficial World Cup ====
1970 Women's World Cup - DNC

1971 Women's World Cup - DNC

Women's World Invitational Tournament

Mundialito (women) - Bronze in 1986

1988 FIFA Women's Invitation Tournament - Fourth Place

== See also ==
- Sport in China
  - Football in China
    - Women's football in China
- Chinese Football Association (CFA)
- China women's national football team
  - China women's national football team results and fixtures
  - List of China women's international footballers
- China women's national under-20 football team
- China women's national under-17 football team
- China women's national futsal team

Sporting positions
Preceded by 1983 Thailand	AFC Women's Champions; 1986 (first title); 1989 (second title); 1991 (third title); 1993 (fourth title); 1995 (fifth title); 1997 (sixth title); 1999 (seventh title)	Succeeded by 2001 North Korea
Preceded by 2003 North Korea	AFC Women's Champions; 2006 (eighth title)	Succeeded by 2008 North Korea
Preceded by 2018 Japan	AFC Women's Champions; 2022 (ninth title)	Succeeded by 2026 Japan
