= 2028 AFC Women's Olympic Qualifying Tournament =

Tournament details
- Dates: 19 April 2027 – 4 March 2028
- Teams: 8 (from 1 confederation)

The 2028 AFC Women's Olympic Qualifying Tournament is the seventh edition of the AFC Women's Olympic Qualifying Tournament, the quadrennial international football competition organised by the Asian Football Confederation (AFC) to determine which women's national teams from Asia qualify for the Olympic football tournament.

The top two teams of the tournament qualify for the 2028 Summer Olympics women's football tournament in the United States as AFC representatives, while a third team will advance to a play-off match against Argentina, a CONMEBOL representative. This was the first edition of the qualification where 2026 edition of the AFC Women's Asian Cup served as a penultimate stage for the qualification with the eight quarterfinalists progressing to this tournament.

== Format ==
Of the 47 AFC member associations, a total of 8 AFC member national teams qualified after reaching the quarterfinals of the 2026 AFC Women's Asian Cup. The eight teams will be divided into two groups of four teams and play a round-robin league format, with the two group winners qualifying for the Olympics. A two-match playoff will then be held to determine who will advance to the AFC–CONMEBOL play-off against Argentina to determine the final qualifier.

== Schedule ==
The match schedule will be as follows:

Stage	Round	Dates
Group stage	Matchday 1	19 April 2027
Group stage	Matchday 2	24 April 2027
Group stage	Matchday 3	7 October 2027
Group stage	Matchday 4	12 October 2027
Group stage	Matchday 5	29 November 2027
Group stage	Matchday 6	4 December 2027
Play-off	Matchday 1	28 February 2028
Play-off	Matchday 2	4 March 2028

== Teams ==
The draw was held at the AFC House in Kuala Lumpur, Malaysia on 12 November 2026 at 15:00 MST (UTC+8). The teams are seeded according to the October 2026 FIFA Women's World Ranking.

Draw pots (Note: Numbers in parentheses indicate the FIFA Women's World Ranking at the time of the draw.)
Pot 1	Pot 2	Pot 3	Pot 4
Japan (5); North Korea (12)	Australia (15); South Korea (17)	China (18); Chinese Taipei (38)	Philippines (39); Uzbekistan (51)

== Tournament ==
=== Group A ===
Pos	Team	Pld	W	D	L	GF	GA	GD	Pts	Qualification
1	Japan	0	0	0	0	0	0	0	0	Summer Olympics
2	Australia	0	0	0	0	0	0	0	0	Play-off
3	Chinese Taipei	0	0	0	0	0	0	0	0	
4	Uzbekistan	0	0	0	0	0	0	0	0	

First match(es) will be played: 19 April 2027. Source: AFC
19 April 2027

Japan	v	Uzbekistan

19 April 2027

Chinese Taipei	v	Australia

24 April 2027

Uzbekistan	v	Chinese Taipei

24 April 2027

Australia	v	Japan

7 October 2027

Uzbekistan	v	Australia

7 October 2027

Japan	v	Chinese Taipei

12 October 2027

Australia	v	Uzbekistan

12 October 2027

Chinese Taipei	v	Japan

29 November 2027

Uzbekistan	v	Japan

29 November 2027

Australia	v	Chinese Taipei

4 December 2027

Japan	v	Australia

4 December 2027

Chinese Taipei	v	Uzbekistan

=== Group B ===
Pos	Team	Pld	W	D	L	GF	GA	GD	Pts	Qualification
1	North Korea	0	0	0	0	0	0	0	0	Summer Olympics
2	South Korea	0	0	0	0	0	0	0	0	Play-off
3	China	0	0	0	0	0	0	0	0	
4	Philippines	0	0	0	0	0	0	0	0	

First match(es) will be played: 19 April 2027. Source: AFC
19 April 2027

North Korea	v	Philippines

19 April 2027

China	v	South Korea

24 April 2027

Philippines	v	China

24 April 2027

South Korea	v	North Korea

7 October 2027

Philippines	v	South Korea

7 October 2027

North Korea	v	China

12 October 2027

South Korea	v	Philippines

12 October 2027

China	v	North Korea

29 November 2027

Philippines	v	North Korea

29 November 2027

South Korea	v	China

4 December 2027

North Korea	v	South Korea

4 December 2027

China	v	Philippines

=== Play-off ===
Team 1	Agg.	Team 2	1st leg	2nd leg
Runner-up Group B		Runner-up Group A	28 Feb '28	4 Mar '28

28 February 2028

Runner-up Group B	v	Runner-up Group A

4 March 2028

Runner-up Group A	v	Runner-up Group B

== Qualified teams for the 2028 Summer Olympics ==
The following two teams from AFC qualified for the 2028 Summer Olympic women's football tournament in Los Angeles, United States.

Team	Qualified on	Previous appearances in Summer Olympics
Group A winner	2027	
Group B winner	2027	

== See also ==
- 2025 Copa América Femenina
