= AFC Women's Olympic Qualifying Tournament =

- Founded: 2004; 22 years ago
- Region: Asia (AFC)
- Current champions: Australia
- Most championships: Australia (2 titles)
- 2028

Since 2004, the Asian Football Confederation (AFC) has held Asian qualifying tournaments for the Summer Olympics women's football tournaments. The two top teams from the tournament qualify for the Olympics, excluding the berth for the hosts if the Olympic is held in an Asian country.

== History ==
Women's football was introduced to Olympics in 1996, but until 2000 the participating teams were determined by the results of preceding FIFA Women's World Cup. Continental confederations, including the AFC, have held qualifying tournaments since 2004.

== Format ==
Until 2024, the format differ by the tournaments (See the pages of each qualifying tournaments for details).

Since 2028, the top eight finishers (i.e. all quarter-finalists) of the latest AFC Women's Asian Cup will battle for the right to reach the Olympic Games. The teams will be divided into two groups of four teams and play a double round-robin home-and-away format, with the winner of each group taking their place at the Women’s Olympic Football Tournament.

== Results ==
Flags for the qualifying tournaments indicate the hosts of the final rounds; indicates the final round was held in various places.

Edition	Olympics	Qualifying tournament	Qualified teams			Notes	Number of teams
Edition	Olympics	Qualifying tournament	Olympic hosts	via qualifying		Notes	Number of teams
1	(United States) 1996	( (Sweden) 1995 World Cup)	—	China (fourth place)	Japan (quarterfinalists)	Top 8 teams in the World Cup were to qualify	(2)
2	(Australia) 2000	( (United States) 1999 World Cup)	—	China (runners-up)	—	Top 8 teams in the World Cup were to qualify	(3)
3	(Greece) 2004	(Japan) Qualifying	—	China (winners)	Japan (runners-up)		11
4	(China) 2008	Qualifying	China	North Korea (Group A winners)	Japan (Group B winners)	Two group winners of final round were to qualify	12
5	(United Kingdom) 2012	(China) Qualifying	—	Japan (winners)	North Korea (runners-up)		17
6	(Brazil) 2016	(Japan) Qualifying	—	Australia (winners)	China (runners-up)		18
7	(Japan) 2020	Qualifying	Japan	Australia (play-off winners)	China (play-off winners)	Two play-off winners were to qualify	25
8	(France) 2024	Qualifying	—	Australia (play-off winners)	Japan (play-off winners)	Two play-off winners were to qualify	31
9	(United States) 2028	Qualifying	—			Two group winners are to qualify. An additional team will face Argentina in an intercontinental play-off for the final Olympic berth.	8
10	(Australia) 2032	Qualifying	Australia			Two group winners are to qualify	8

== See also ==
- Summer Olympics women's football tournaments
