= Shao Ziqin =

Chinese footballer (born 2003)

Personal information
- Date of birth: 24 February 2003 (age 23)
- Place of birth: China
- Height: 1.77 m (5 ft 10 in)
- Position: Forward

Team information
- Current team: SL Benfica

Senior career*
Years	Team	Apps	(Gls)
–2025	Jiangsu LFC		
2026–	SL Benfica		

International career^{‡}
2025–	China	16	(10)
- * Club domestic league appearances and goals ‡ National team caps and goals as of 17 March 2026

Shao Ziqin (Chinese: 邵子钦; born 24 February 2003) is a Chinese professional footballer who plays as a forward for SL Benfica.

== Early life ==
Shao was born on 24 February 2003. Born in China, she is the twin sister of Chinese footballer Shao Zijia.

== Club career ==
Shao started her career with Chinese side Jiangsu LFC. Following her stint there, she signed for Portuguese side SL Benfica in 2026.

== International career ==
Shao made her debut for national team on 19 February 2025 against Canada at 2025 Pinatar Cup. She scored her first goal for national team against Chinese Taipei three day later. During the spring of 2026, she played for the China women's national football team at the 2026 AFC Women's Asian Cup.

=== Career statistics ===
As of match played 17 March 2026

Appearances and goals by national team and year
National team	Year	Apps	Goals
China	2025	11	8
China	2026	5	2
Total		16	10

Scores and results list China's goal tally first, score column indicates score after each Shao goal.

List of international goals scored by Shao Ziqin
No.	Date	Venue	Opponent	Score	Result	Competition
1.	22 February 2025	Pinatar Arena, San Pedro del Pinatar, Spain	Chinese Taipei	2–0	4–0	2025 Pinatar Cup
2.	5 April 2025	Yongchuan Sports Center, Chongqing, China	Uzbekistan	2–0	5–0	2025 Yongchuan International Tournament
3.	8 April 2025	Yongchuan Sports Center, Chongqing, China	Thailand	1–0	5–1	2025 Yongchuan International Tournament
4.	8 April 2025	Yongchuan Sports Center, Chongqing, China	Thailand	2–0	5–1	2025 Yongchuan International Tournament
5.	8 April 2025	Yongchuan Sports Center, Chongqing, China	Thailand	4–1	5–1	2025 Yongchuan International Tournament
6.	9 July 2025	Suwon World Cup Stadium, Suwon, South Korea	South Korea	2–1	2–2	2025 EAFF E-1 Football Championship
7.	13 July 2025	Hwaseong Stadium, Hwaseong, South Korea	Chinese Taipei	1–0	4–2	2025 EAFF E-1 Football Championship
8.	13 July 2025	Hwaseong Stadium, Hwaseong, South Korea	Chinese Taipei	4–2	4–2	2025 EAFF E-1 Football Championship
9.	6 March 2026	Western Sydney Stadium, Sydney, Australia	Uzbekistan	1–0	3–0	2026 AFC Women's Asian Cup
10.	14 March 2026	Perth Rectangular Stadium, Perth, Australia	Chinese Taipei	1–0	2–0 (a.e.t.)	2026 AFC Women's Asian Cup

== Style of play ==
Shao plays as a forward. Chinese news website Sohu wrote in 2026 "standing at 1.79 meters tall, playing as a center forward, and possessing exceptional heading ability - these are Shao Ziqin's most distinctive characteristics. In women's football, such physical attributes are considered exceptionally advantageous".
