= Kotryna Kulbytė =

Lithuanian women's football coach

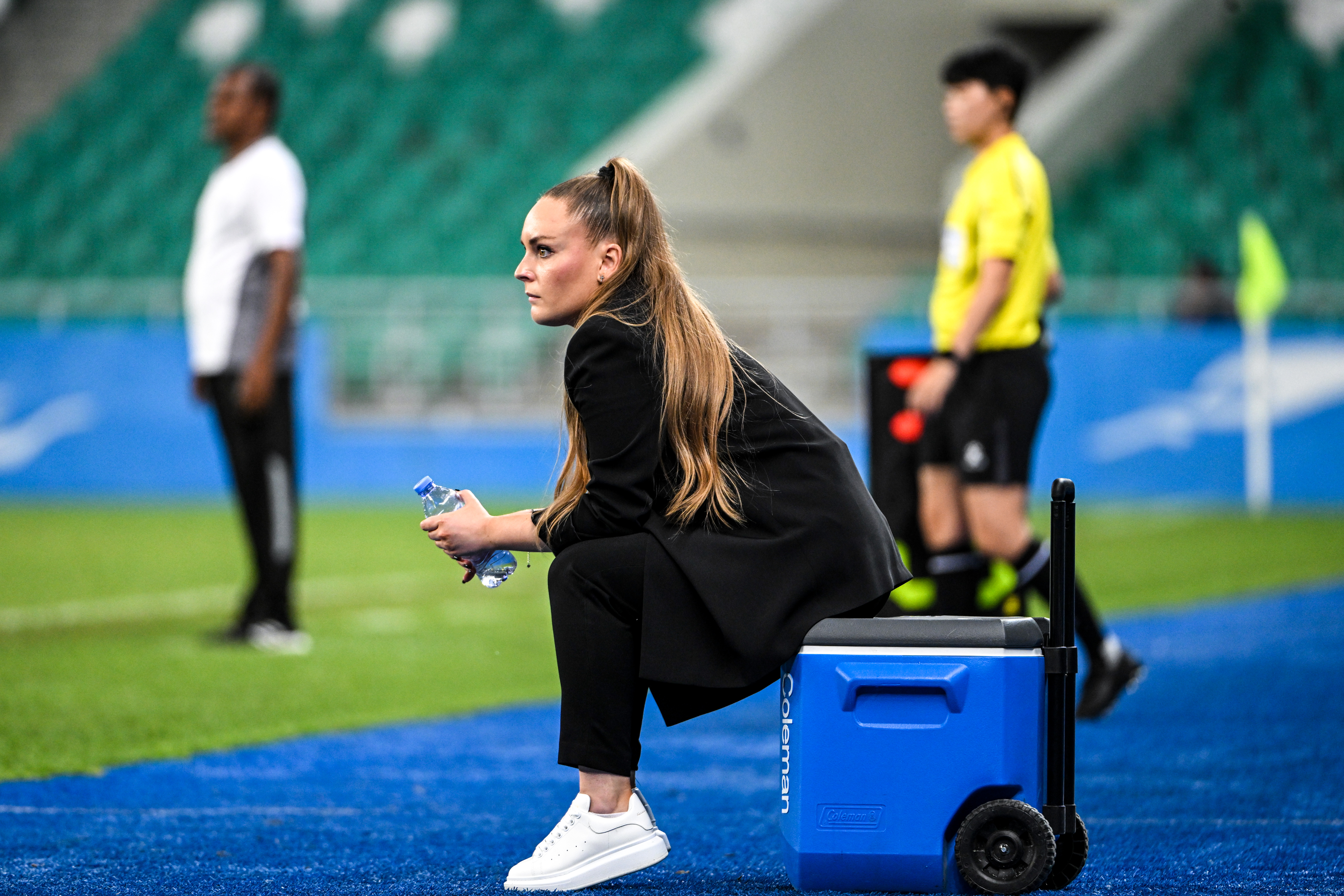
- Kotryna Kulbytė in Bunyodkor Stadium, 2025

Personal information
- Date of birth: January 10, 1993 (age 33)
- Place of birth: Jonava, Lithuania

Team information
- Current team: Uzbekistan (head coach)

Managerial career
- Years: Team
- 2015–2018: Lithuania U15 (assistant coach)
- 2017–2019: Baltijos Futbolo Akademija (youth coach)
- 2020–2022: FK Vilnius (head coach, technical director)
- 2021–2025: Lithuania U15 & U17 (head coach)
- 2022–2025: Lithuania (assistant coach)
- 2025–: Uzbekistan (head coach)

Kotryna Kulbytė is a Lithuanian UEFA PRO-level football coach who currently leads the Uzbekistan women's national team. She also worked as football analyst, coaches instructor.

== Career ==
From 2014 to 2018 she was a youth coach for boys in several Lithuanian football clubs' academy. At the same time, from 2015 to 2018 she was an assistant coach in Lithuania WU15 and WU17 teams. From 2016 to 2019, she served as a head coach in Lithuanian national girls football academy.

From 2019 to 2020, she lived and worked in Brazil as individual skills coach, gaining experience in a different football environment and developing her expertise in individual player development

Since 2020, she worked as assistant coach in youth age groups with Lithuania's WU15 and WU17 teams. From 2020 to 2023, she was head coach and technical director for FK Vilnius women's section, combining coaching with responsibility for the development of the club's women's football programme.

From 2021 to 2025, she was head coach of the Lithuanian WU15 and WU17 national teams. During the same period, she worked in coach education department as a UEFA instructor for UEFA C and UEFA B licence courses and was involved in the women's football and coach education departments of the Lithuanian Football Federation. From 2022 to 2025, she was also an assistant coach of the Lithuania women's national team.

In November 2023, she completed the UEFA Pro Licence, becoming the first Lithuanian woman to obtain the highest UEFA coaching qualification. She was subsequently selected for UEFA's Coach Mentor Programme, where she was mentored by former Norway women's national team head coach Gemma Grainger. These achievements further established her as one of Lithuania's leading female coaches.

On January 16, 2025, she was appointed as the head coach of Uzbekistan women's national team. Under her leadership, Uzbekistan achieved one of the most significant results in the history of the country's women's national football team. Kulbytė guided Uzbekistan to qualification for the 2026 AFC Women's Asian Cup in Australia, ending a 23-year absence from the continental tournament. Uzbekistan had last appeared at the Asian Cup in 2003, making its return to the competition a landmark moment for women's football in the country. The achievement became even more historic during the tournament itself. For the first time in Uzbekistan's history, the national team progressed from the Asian Cup group stage to the knockout stage, reaching the quarter-finals. The AFC described Uzbekistan as "history-makers", highlighting the unprecedented nature of the team's progress.Reaching the quarter-finals also had an important consequence beyond the Asian Cup itself. By advancing to the knockout stage, Uzbekistan secured a place in the FIFA Women's World Cup Intercontinental Play-Off Tournament, giving the country an opportunity to compete for qualification for the first FIFA Women's World Cup.

In February 2026, she was named Lithuania's best women's football coach for the second consecutive year.

== Personal life ==
Kotryna speaks multiple languages and is fluent in Lithuanian, English, Portuguese and Russian.
