= Zhang Rui (footballer) =

Chinese footballer (born 1989)

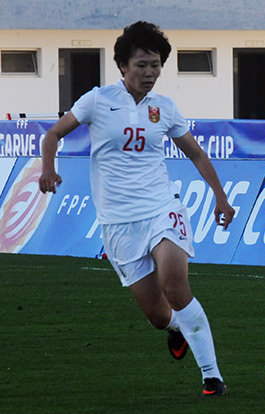

Personal information
- Full name: Zhang Rui
- Date of birth: 17 January 1989 (age 37)
- Place of birth: Yantai, Shandong, China
- Height: 1.72 m (5 ft 8 in)
- Position: Midfielder

Team information
- Current team: Shandong Jinghua
- Number: 20

Senior career*
Years	Team	Apps	(Gls)
2007–2016	Bayi		
2017–2019	Changchun Zhuoyue		
2020	Bayi		
2021-2023	Shandong Sports Lottery	22	(5)
2023	→ Wuhan Jianghan University (loan)	1	(0)
2024	Henan Jianye	0	(0)
2025-	Shandong Jinghua	2	(0)

International career^{‡}
2009–	China	154	(30)
Medal record
Women's football
Representing China
Asian Games
Silver medal – second place	2018 Palembang	Team
- * Club domestic league appearances and goals ‡ National team caps and goals as of 25 June 2019

Zhang Rui (simplified Chinese: 张睿; traditional Chinese: 張睿; pinyin: Zhāng Ruì; born 17 January 1989) is a Chinese footballer who plays for Shandong Jinghua as a midfielder and for the China women's national football team.

== Club career ==
She debuted in 2006, at the Provincial Games held in Yantai, as part of the Yantai team which got the second place in the event. She got approached by several teams afterwards, joining the Bayi team.

== International career ==
Zhang Rui made her debut for the Chinese women's national team on 4 March 2009 in a 0–0 draw with Sweden at the 2009 Algarve Cup.

In 2014, at an invitational tournament in Brazil, she scored three goals in six minutes against Argentina.

In May 2014, Zhang was called up to the China squad for the 2014 AFC Women's Asian Cup.

In 2015, she represented the China national football team in the 2015 FIFA Women's World Cup. In 2017, she was awarded the title of "International Athlete" by the General Administration of Sport of China.

On 7 July 2016, Zhang was called up to the China squad for the 2016 Summer Olympics.

On 29 March 2018, Zhang was called up to the China squad for the 2018 AFC Women's Asian Cup.

In 2019, she represented the China national football team in the 2019 FIFA Women's World Cup.

On 5 July 2023, Zhang was called up to the China squad for the 2023 FIFA Women's World Cup.

On 19 February 2026, Zhang was called up to the China squad for the 2026 AFC Women's Asian Cup.

== Honours ==
China

- Asian Games silver medalist: 2018; bronze medalist: 2022
- AFC Women's Asian Cup: 2022

== International goals ==
No.	Date	Venue	Opponent	Score	Result	Competition
1.	21 May 2010	Shuangliu Sports Centre Stadium, Chengdu, China	Vietnam	3–0	5–0	2010 AFC Women's Asian Cup
2.	23 May 2010	Chengdu Sports Center, Chengdu, China	Australia	1–0	1–0	2010 AFC Women's Asian Cup
3.	27 May 2012	PPL Park, Chester, United States	United States	1–0	1–4	Friendly
4.	17 June 2012	Centre Park, Mangere, New Zealand	New Zealand	1–2	1–3	Friendly
5.	22 November 2012	Shenzhen Stadium, Shenzhen, China	Chinese Taipei	1–0	2–0	2013 EAFF Women's East Asian Cup
6.	24 November 2012	Shenzhen Stadium, Shenzhen, China	Australia	2–1	2–1	2013 EAFF Women's East Asian Cup
7.	16 January 2013	Yongchuan Sports Center, Chongqing, China	South Korea	1–0	2–0	2013 Four Nations Tournament
8.	18 September 2014	Namdong Asiad Rugby Field, Incheon, South Korea	Chinese Taipei	3–0	4–0	2014 Asian Games
9.	14 December 2014	Estádio Nacional Mané Garrincha, Brasília, Brazil	Argentina	4–0	6–0	2014 International Tournament of Brasília
10.	14 December 2014	Estádio Nacional Mané Garrincha, Brasília, Brazil	Argentina	5–0	6–0	2014 International Tournament of Brasília
11.	14 December 2014	Estádio Nacional Mané Garrincha, Brasília, Brazil	Argentina	6–0	6–0	2014 International Tournament of Brasília
12.	23 January 2016	Shenzhen Universiade Sports Centre, Foshan, China	Vietnam	1–0	8–0	2016 Four Nations Tournament
13.	23 January 2016	Shenzhen Universiade Sports Centre, Foshan, China	Vietnam	4–0	8–0	2016 Four Nations Tournament
14.	29 February 2016	Nagai Stadium Osaka, Japan	Vietnam	2–0	2–0	2016 AFC Women's Olympic Qualifying Tournament
15.	4 March 2016	Kincho Stadium, Osaka, Japan	Japan	1–0	2–1	2016 AFC Women's Olympic Qualifying Tournament
16.	2 June 2016	Kunshan Stadium, Kunshan, China	Thailand	2–0	6–0	Friendly
17.	2 June 2016	Kunshan Stadium, Kunshan, China	Thailand	3–0	6–0	Friendly
18.	21 January 2017	Century Lotus Stadium, Foshan, China	Myanmar	1–0	2–0	2017 Four Nations Tournament
19.	21 January 2017	Century Lotus Stadium, Foshan, China	Myanmar	2–0	2–0	2017 Four Nations Tournament
20.	21 October 2017	Yongchuan Sports Center, Chongqing, China	Mexico	2–2	3–2	2017 Yongchuan International Tournament
21.	6 October 2018	Yongchuan Sports Center, Chongqing, China	Finland	2–1	2–1	2018 Yongchuan International Tournament
22.	17 January 2019	Wuhua County Olympic Sports Centre, Meizhou, China	Nigeria	1–0	3–0	2019 Four Nations Tournament
23.	3 March 2026	Western Sydney Stadium, Sydney, Australia	Bangladesh	2–0	2–0	2026 AFC Women's Asian Cup

== See also ==
- List of women's footballers with 100 or more caps
