= Maftuna Jonimqulova =

Uzbekistani footballer

Personal information
- Full name: Maftuna Fazliddin qizi Jonimqulova
- Date of birth: 26 July 1999 (age 27)
- Place of birth: Qarshi, Uzbekistan
- Position: Goalkeeper

Team information
- Current team: Sevinch

Senior career*
Years	Team	Apps	(Gls)
- Sevinch

International career^{‡}
2014	Uzbekistan U16	1+	(0)
2016–2017	Uzbekistan U19	6	(0)
2017–	Uzbekistan	2+	(1)
2018	Uzbekistan (futsal)	1+	(0)
- * Club domestic league appearances and goals ‡ National team caps and goals as of 9 April 2019

Maftuna Jonimqulova (born 26 July 1999) is an Uzbekistani footballer who plays as a goalkeeper for Women's Championship club Sevinch and the Uzbekistan women's national team.

== International career ==
Jonimqulova capped for Uzbekistan at senior level during the 2018 AFC Women's Asian Cup qualification. Started all games for Uzbekistan in the 2026 Women’s Asian Cup.

=== International goals ===
Scores and results list Uzbekistan's goal tally first

No.	Date	Venue	Opponent	Score	Result	Competition
1	23 November 2018	Milliy Stadium, Tashkent, Uzbekistan	Afghanistan	15–0	20–0	2018 CAFA Women's Championship

== See also ==
- List of Uzbekistan women's international footballers
