= List of Uzbekistan women's international footballers =

This is a list of Uzbekistan women's international footballers who have played for the Uzbekistan women's national football team.

== Players ==
| Name | Caps | Goals | National team years | Club(s) |
|---|---|---|---|---|
| Nargiza Abdurasulova | 5 | 6 | 2009 | – |
| Gulzoda Amirova | 1+ | 1 | 2018 | – |
| Dilnoza Bektemirova | 1 | 0 | 2019 | (Uzbekistan) PFK Bunyodkor |
| Alibina Belalova | 2 | 0 | 2009 | – |
| Elena Belova | 2 | 0 | 2009 | – |
| Feruza Bobokhujaeva | 1 | 0 | 2018 | (Uzbekistan) PFK Sevinch |
| Malika Burkhonova | 5 | 0 | – | (Uzbekistan) PFK Sevinch |
| Elvina Djaferova | 1 | 0 | 2009 | – |
| Diyora Erkinova | 1+ | 1 | 2018 | – |
| Aziza Ermatova | 9 | 1 | 2009–2013 | – |
| Saida Galimova | 3 | 0 | – | (Uzbekistan) PFK Bunyodkor |
| Goolshanoy Jalolova | 2 | 0 | 2009 | – |
| Maftuna Jonimqulova | 1 | 0 | – | (Uzbekistan) PFK Bunyodkor |
| Zebo Juraeva | 8 | 10 | 2009–2013 | – |
| Olga Kakharova | 5 | 0 | 2009–2013 | – |
| Lyudmila Karachik | 7 | 5 | – | (Uzbekistan) PFK Bunyodkor |
| Diyorakhon Khabibullaeva | 1 | 0 | – | (Uzbekistan) PFK Sogdiana |
| Solikha Khusniddinova | 3 | 0 | – | (Uzbekistan) PFK Bunyodkor |
| Ugiloy Kuchkarova | 3 | 1 | – | (Uzbekistan) PFK Sevinch |
| Nilufar Kudratova | 5 | 2 | – | (Uzbekistan) PFK Sevinch |
| Shahnoza Kurbonova | 1+ | 2 | 2018 | – |
| Elena Lagutkina | 1 | 0 | 2009 | – |
| Maria Moiseeva | 5 | 0 | 2009 | – |
| Maluda Munavarova | 5 | 0 | 2009–2017 | – |
| Lianna Narbekova | 4 | 1 | 2017 | – |
| Dildora Nozimova | 3 | 1 | – | (Uzbekistan) PFK Metallurg |
| Kamola Riskieva | 6 | 1 | 2009–2013 | – |
| Sadokat Ruzieva | 8 | 0 | 2009–2013 | – |
| Mariya Sabirova | 1 | 0 | 2009 | – |
| Rushaniya Safina | 4 | 0 | – | (Uzbekistan) PFK Sevinch |
| Makhliyo Sarikova | 9 | 6 | – | (Uzbekistan) PFK Bunyodkor |
| Kseniya Senina | 3 | 1 | 2009 | – |
| Laylo Shodieva | 2+ | 0 | 2018– | (Uzbekistan) PFK Sevinch |
| Maftuna Shoyimova | 7 | 0 | – | (Uzbekistan) PFK Sevinch |
| Shakhnoza Shukurova | 1 | 0 | 2009 | – |
| Setora Takaboeva | 2+ | 1 | 2019– | – |
| Laylo Tilovova | 6 | 0 | – | (Uzbekistan) PFK Sevinch |
| Luiza Toshmetova | 1 | 0 | 2009 | – |
| Makhfuza Turapova | 10 | 5 | 2009–2017 | – |
| Feruza Turdiboeva | 7 | 4 | 2013–2017 | – |
| Nasiba Tursunova | 1 | 0 | 2009 | – |
| Komola Usmanova | 9 | 4 | 2009–2013 | – |
| Tanzilya Zarbieva | 4 | 1 | – | (Uzbekistan) PFK Sevinch |
| Kamila Zaripova | 4 | 0 | – | (Uzbekistan) PFK AGMK |
| Umida Zoirova | 7 | 1 | – | (Uzbekistan) PFK Bunyodkor |

== See also ==
- Uzbekistan women's national football team
