= Li Qingtong =

Chinese footballer

Personal information
- Date of birth: 14 April 1999 (age 27)
- Place of birth: Guangzhou, China
- Height: 1.63 m (5 ft 4 in)
- Position: Midfielder

Team information
- Current team: Meizhou Hakka

International career
Years	Team	Apps	(Gls)
- China

Li Qingtong (Chinese: 李晴潼, born 14 April 1999) is a Chinese professional football player who plays for Meizhou Hakka and the Chinese national team. She studied at Guangzhou Sport University.
