= Mahnaz Zokaee =

Iranian football referee (born 1989)

- Full name: Mahnaz Zokaee
- Born: 13 November 1989 (age 36); Tehran, Iran
- Other occupation: Production Engineer

Domestic
Years	League	Role
2010–	Kowsar Women Football League	Referee

International
Years	League	Role
2018–	FIFA listed	Referee

Mahnaz Zokaee (Persian: مهناز ذکایی; born 13 November 1989) is an Iranian FIFA listed match official who officiates generally in the role of referee in the Kowsar Women's football league and AFC women's competitions.

She has been in the FIFA list of International referees since 2018.

== International career ==
Zokaee's early international career has included involvement in the 2022 AFC Women's Asian Cup as a referee. In 2019, She was nominated to officiate in the 2019 AFC U-16 Women's Championship as 4th official. Zokaee was also nominated as a referee in the 2024 AFC Women's Olympic Qualifying Tournament.

== See also ==
- List of football referees
