= Uzbekistan women's national football team =

Women's national association football team for Uzbekistan

Uzbekistan
- Association: Uzbekistan Football Federation
- Confederation: AFC (Asia)
- Sub-confederation: CAFA (Central Asia)
- Head coach: Kotryna Kulbytė
- Top scorer: Diyorakhon Khabibullaeva (44)
- FIFA code: UZB
First colours	Second colours

FIFA ranking
- Current: 51 (20 October 2026)
- Highest: 38 (September 2011)
- Lowest: 52 (August 2025)

First international
- Uzbekistan 1–0 India (Kota Kinabalu, Malaysia; 23 September 1995)

Biggest win
- Uzbekistan 20–0 Afghanistan (Tashkent, Uzbekistan; 23 November 2018)

Biggest defeat
- Japan 17–0 Uzbekistan (Kota Kinabalu, Malaysia; 27 September 1995)

Asian Cup
- Appearances: 7 (first in 1995)
- Best result: Quarter-finals (2026)

CAFA Championship
- Appearances: 2 (first in 2018)
- Best result: Champions (2018, 2022)
Medal record
CAFA Women's Championship
Gold medal – first place	2018 Uzbekistan
Gold medal – first place	2022 Tajikistan

The Uzbekistan women's national football team (Uzbek: Oʻzbekiston ayollar milliy futbol terma jamoasi) represents Uzbekistan in international women's football. It has played in five continental championships. The team won the regional Central Asian Football Association women's championship in 2018.

Uzbekistan will be the first central Asian nation to host the AFC Women's Asian Cup in 2029.

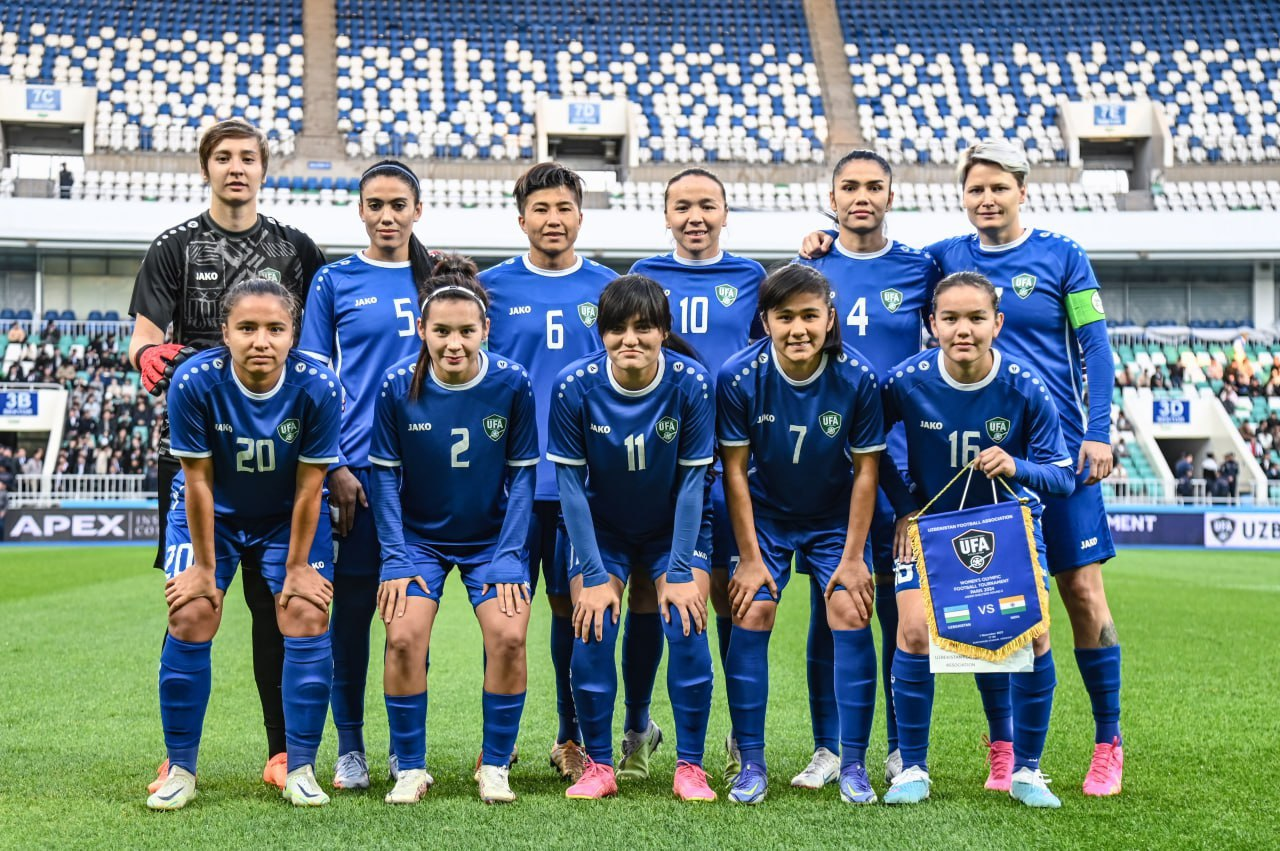
The team in 2023.

== Results and fixtures ==
The following is a list of match results in the last 12 months, as well as any future matches that have been scheduled.

Legend

Win Draw Loss Fixtures

=== 2025 ===
29 November Friendly	Uzbekistan	2–0	Iran	Tashkent, Uzbekistan
				Stadium: TBC

2 December Friendly	Uzbekistan	1–0	Iran	Tashkent, Uzbekistan
				Stadium: TBC

=== 2026 ===
27 January Friendly	Vietnam	1–0	Uzbekistan	Hanoi, Vietnam
--:-- UTC+7	Nguyễn Thị Bích Thùy 59'	Report

30 January Friendly	Vietnam	2–6	Uzbekistan	Hanoi, Vietnam
--:-- UTC+7

3 March AFC Women's Asian Cup GS	North Korea	3–0	Uzbekistan	Sydney, Australia
13:00 UTC+11	Myong Yu-jong 6', 24' (pen.), 41' (pen.)	Report (AFC); Report (FIFA)		Stadium: Western Sydney Stadium; Attendance: 1,268; Referee: Casey Reibelt (Australia)

6 March AFC Women's Asian Cup GS	Uzbekistan	0–3	China	Sydney, Australia
19:00 UTC+11		Report (AFC); Report (FIFA)	Shao Ziqin 30' (pen.); Li Qingtong 51', 77'	Stadium: Western Sydney Stadium; Attendance: 8,322; Referee: Supiree Testhomya (Thailand)

9 March AFC Women's Asian Cup GS	Bangladesh	0–4	Uzbekistan	Perth, Australia
		Report (AFC); Report (FIFA)	Khabibullaeva 10'; Nozimova 62', 66'; Kudratova 88'	Stadium: Perth Rectangular Stadium; Attendance: 1,117; Referee: Mahnaz Zokaee (Iran)

14 March AFC Women's Asian Cup QF	South Korea	6–0	Uzbekistan	Sydney, Australia
20:00 UTC+11	Son Hwa-yeon 9'; Ko Yoo-jin 20'; Park Soo-jeong 57'; Ji So-yun 72'; Lee Eun-young 85'; Jang Sel-gi 90+3' (pen.)	Report (AFC); Report (FIFA)		Stadium: Stadium Australia; Attendance: 12,974; Referee: Lara Lee (Australia)

19 March AFC Women's Asian Cup PI	Uzbekistan	0–2	Philippines	Gold Coast, Australia
13:00 UTC+10		Report (AFC); Report (FIFA)	Beard 47'; Sawicki 52'	Stadium: Gold Coast Stadium; Attendance: 1,922; Referee: Casey Reibelt (Australia)

3 June AYA Bank Tri-Nations Cup	Myanmar	0–1	Uzbekistan	Yangon, Myanmar
17:00 UTC+6:30			Nilufar Kudratova 22'	Stadium: Thuwunna Stadium

6 June AYA Bank Tri-Nations Cup	Uzbekistan	0–1	Thailand	Yangon, Myanmar
16:00 UTC+6:30		Report	Jiraporn 2'	Stadium: Thuwunna Stadium; Referee: Khin Nyein Chan (Myanmar)

14 September 2026 Asian Games GS	Philippines	1–1	Uzbekistan	Gifu, Japan
14:00 UTC+9	Collins 89'	Report	Egamberdieva 81'	Stadium: Gifu Nagaragawa Stadium; Referee: Lê Thị Ly (Vietnam)

17 September 2026 Asian Games GS	Uzbekistan	1–1	China	Gifu, Japan
14:00 UTC+9	Dadaboeva 42'	Report	Zhang Linyan 70'	Stadium: Gifu Nagaragawa Stadium; Attendance: 226; Referee: Azusa Sugino (Japan)

21 September 2026 Asian Games GS	Uzbekistan	2–1	Hong Kong	Kariya, Japan
16:00 UTC+9	Khabibullaeva 34'; Shoyimova 90+2'	Report	Wei Lan 65'	Stadium: Wave Stadium Kariya; Attendance: 561; Referee: Park Se-jin (South Korea)

25 September 2026 Asian Games QF	South Korea	6–3	Uzbekistan	Osaka, Japan
19:30 UTC+9	Yoon Su-jeong 6', 44'; Choe Yu-ri 17', 45+1'; Khabibullaeva 74' (o.g.); Kim Min-ji 90+4'	Report	Khabibullaeva 10'; Jang Sel-gi 64' (o.g.); Kudratova 66'	Stadium: Nagai Stadium; Attendance: 240; Referee: Mu Mingxin (China)

9 October Friendly	Morocco	3–1	Uzbekistan	Rabat, Morocco
	Jraïdi 65', 67', 79'		Khabibullaeva 16'	Stadium: Moulay El Hassan Stadium

12 October Friendly	Morocco	0–0	Uzbekistan	Rabat, Morocco
				Stadium: Al Medina Stadium

28 November 2027 FIFA Women's World Cup qualification	Uzbekistan	–	Papua New Guinea	Salé, Morocco
16:30 UTC+0				Stadium: Mohammed VI Football Academy

1 December 2027 FIFA Women's World Cup qualification	Uzbekistan	–	Ghana	Salé, Morocco
16:30 UTC+0				Stadium: Mohammed VI Football Academy

5 December 2027 FIFA Women's World Cup qualification	South Africa	–	Uzbekistan	Salé, Morocco
17:00 UTC+0				Stadium: Mohammed VI Football Academy

=== 2027 ===
19 April 2028 Olympic Qualifiers	Japan	v	Uzbekistan	Japan
		Report

24 April 2028 Olympic Qualifiers	Uzbekistan	v	Chinese Taipei	Uzbekistan
		Report

7 October 2028 Olympic Qualifiers	Uzbekistan	v	Australia	Uzbekistan
		Report

12 October 2028 Olympic Qualifiers	Australia	v	Uzbekistan	Australia
		Report

29 November 2028 Olympic Qualifiers	Uzbekistan	v	Japan	Uzbekistan
		Report

4 December 2028 Olympic Qualifiers	Chinese Taipei	v	Uzbekistan	Taiwan
		Report

== Players ==
Up-to-date caps, goals, and statistics are not publicly available; therefore, caps and goals listed may be incorrect.

=== Current squad ===
The following players were called up for the international friendly against Myanmar on 3 June 2026 in Yangon.

Caps and goals are correct as of 29 October 2025, after the match against Philippines.

No.	Pos.	Player	Date of birth (age)	Caps	Goals	Club
1	GK	Maftuna Jonimqulova	26 July 1999 (age 27)	3	0	(Uzbekistan Football Association) Sevinch
12	GK	Kumushoy Gulomova	6 November 1999 (age 27)			(Uzbekistan Football Association) Sogdiana-W
13	GK	Zarina Saidova	19 September 2001 (age 25)			(Uzbekistan Football Association) Nasaf Qarshi
2	DF	Madina Khikmatova	9 August 2001 (age 25)			(Uzbekistan Football Association) Qizilqum-W
3	DF	Kholida Dadaboeva	12 April 1993 (age 33)			(Uzbekistan Football Association) FC Sogdiana Jizzakh
4	DF	Nazira Sayfitdinova	17 March 2007 (aged 19)			(Uzbekistan Football Association) Bunyodkor
14	DF	Rukhshona Olimjonova	28 November 2005 (age 20)			(Uzbekistan Football Association) FC AGMK
15	DF	Rukhshona Usarova	26 July 2007 (age 19)			(Uzbekistan Football Association) Sogdiana-W
22	DF	Sevinch Kuchkarova	28 November 2004 (age 21)			(Uzbekistan Football Association) FC AGMK
23	DF	Diyora Bakhtiyarova	29 August 2007 (aged 18)			(Uzbekistan Football Association) Bunyodkor
5	MF	Solikha Khusniddinova	22 January 1998 (age 28)			(Uzbekistan Football Association) Kocaeli Bayan FK
6	MF	Dilrabo Asadova	22 December 1996 (age 29)			(Uzbekistan Football Association) Zvezda-2005
8	MF	Ilvina Ablyakimova	27 April 1995 (age 31)			(Uzbekistan Football Association) Bunyodkor-W
9	MF	Feruza Tadiboeva	6 January 1994 (age 32)			(Uzbekistan Football Association) Bunyodkor-W
16	MF	Zarina Mamatkarimova	4 March 2004 (age 22)			(Uzbekistan Football Association) Sevinch
20	MF	Mehribon Egamberdieva	9 October 2007 (aged 18)			(Uzbekistan Football Association) Nasaf Qarshi
7	FW	Nilufar Kudratova	5 June 1997 (age 29)			(Uzbekistan Football Association) Nasaf Qarshi
10	FW	Diyorakhon Khabibullaeva	15 October 1999 (age 27)			(Turkish Football Federation) Trabzonspor FC
17	FW	Lyudmila Karachik	6 January 1994 (age 32)			(Uzbekistan Football Association) Nasaf Qarshi
18	FW	Zarina Mamatkarimova	4 March 2004 (age 22)			(Uzbekistan Football Association) Sevinch
19	FW	Oydinoy Turgunova	15 March 2006 (age 20)			(Uzbekistan Football Association) FC AGMK

=== Recent call-ups ===
The following players have been called up to the squad in the past 12 months.

Pos.	Player	Date of birth (age)	Caps	Goals	Club	Latest call-up

== Coaching staff ==
As of 6 April 2023

Position	Name	Ref.
Head coach	(Lithuania) Kotryna Kulbytė	
Assistant coach	(Uzbekistan) Saida Galimova	
Video analyst	(Uzbekistan) Mukhammadaminbek Makhmudov	
Technical analyst	(Uzbekistan) Sabir Pirnazarov	
Team doctor	(Uzbekistan) Rustam Yusupov	
Team administrator	(Uzbekistan) Davron Kudratullaev	

=== Manager history ===
Name	Period	Matches	Wins	Draws	Losses	Winning %	Notes
(Uzbekistan) Yulia Panina	2022–2023	0	0	0	0	00.0%	
(Japan) Midori Honda	2023–2024	0	0	0	0	00.0%	

As of 28 August 2021

== FIFA World Ranking ==
As of 28 August 2021

Best ranking Best mover Worst ranking Worst mover

Uzbekistan's FIFA World Ranking History
Rank	Year	Games Played	Won	Lost	Drawn	Best		Worst	
Rank	Year	Games Played	Won	Lost	Drawn	Rank	Move	Rank	Move
43	2021	7	4	2	1	41	▲0	43	▼2

== All-time results ==
- The following table shows Uzbekistan's all-time international record.

As of 2 July 2025

Against	Played	Won	Drawn	Lost	GF	GA	GD
Total	103	54	9	40	283	176	+107

== Records ==
*Active players in bold, statistics correct as of 28 August 2021.

=== Most capped players ===
#	Player	Year(s)	Caps

=== Top goalscorers ===
As of 2 July 2025

Rank	Player	Year(s)	Goals	Caps
**1**	**Lyudmila Karachik**	2011-	36	
**2**	**Diyorakhon Khabibullaeva**	2018-	38	33
**3**	**Nilufar Kudratova**	2015-	38	39

== Competitive record ==
=== FIFA Women's World Cup ===
FIFA Women's World Cup record										Qualification record						
Year	Result	Position	GP	W	D	L	GF	GA	GD	GP	W	D	L	GF	GA	GD
(China) 1991	Part of Soviet Union									Part of Soviet Union						
(Sweden) 1995	Did not exist									Did not exist						
(United States) 1999	Did not qualify									Via AFC Women's Asian Cup						
(United States) 2003	Did not qualify									Via AFC Women's Asian Cup						
(China) 2007	Did not qualify									Via AFC Women's Asian Cup						
(Germany) 2011	Did not qualify									Via AFC Women's Asian Cup						
(Canada) 2015	Did not qualify									Via AFC Women's Asian Cup						
(France) 2019	Did not qualify									Via AFC Women's Asian Cup						
(Australia) (New Zealand) 2023	Did not qualify									Via AFC Women's Asian Cup						
(Brazil) 2027	To be determined									Via AFC Women's Asian Cup						
(Costa Rica) (Jamaica) (Mexico) (United States) 2031	To be determined									To be determined						
(United Kingdom) 2035	To be determined									To be determined						
Total:0/9	–	–	–	–	–	–	–	–	–	–	–	–	–	–	–	–

=== Olympic Games ===
Summer Olympics record									Qualification record						
Year	Round	Pld	W	D*	L	GF	GA	GD	Pld	W	D*	L	GF	GA	GD
(United States) 1996	Did not enter								Did not enter						
(Australia) 2000	Did not qualify								Via FIFA Women's World Cup						
(Greece) 2004	Did not enter								Did not enter						
(China) 2008	Did not qualify								3	0	1	2	1	13	−12
(United Kingdom) 2012	Did not qualify								7	5	1	1	18	8	+10
(Brazil) 2016	Did not qualify								3	2	0	1	7	2	+5
(Japan) 2020	Did not qualify								3	2	0	1	8	3	+5
(France) 2024	Did not qualify								8	5	0	3	23	15	+8
(United States) 2028	To be determined								To be determined						
(Australia) 2032	To be determined								To be determined						
Total:0/8	–	–	–	–	–	–	–	–	24	14	2	8	57	41	+16

*Denotes draws includes knockout matches decided on penalty kicks.

=== AFC Women's Asian Cup ===
AFC Women's Asian Cup									Qualification record							
Year	Result	M	W	D*	L	GF	GA	GD	M	W	D*	L	GF	GA	GD	Link
(Hong Kong) 1975 to (Japan) 1991	Part of Soviet Union								Part of Soviet Union							
(Malaysia) 1993	Did not exist								Did not exist							
(Malaysia) 1995	Group stage	3	1	0	2	1	17	-16	No Qualification							
(China) 1997	Group stage	3	1	0	2	2	17	-15	No Qualification							
(Philippines) 1999	Group stage	4	3	0	1	9	6	+3	No Qualification							
(Chinese Taipei) 2001	Group stage	3	2	0	1	9	11	-2	No Qualification							
(Thailand) 2003	Group stage	3	0	0	3	2	21	-19	No Qualification							
(Australia) 2006	Did not qualify								3	2	0	1	10	2	+8	Link
(Vietnam) 2008	Did not enter								Did not enter							Link
(China) 2010	Did not qualify								6	4	1	1	19	9	+10	Link
(Vietnam) 2014	Did not qualify								3	2	0	1	22	4	+18	Link
(Jordan) 2018	Did not qualify								4	2	0	2	9	10	-1	Link
(India) 2022	Did not qualify								2	1	0	1	12	4	+8	Link
(Australia) 2026	**Quarter-finals**	5	1	0	4	4	14	-10	3	2	1	0	20	3	+17	Link
(Uzbekistan) 2029	Qualified as host								Qualified as host							Link
Total:6/21	Quarter-finals	21	8	0	13	27	86	-59	21	13	2	6	92	32	+60	Link

*Draws include knockout matches decided on penalty kicks.

=== Asian Games ===
Asian Games record
Year	Result	Position	Pld	W	D*	L	GF	GA	GD
(China) 1990	Part of Soviet Union								
(Japan) 1994	Did not exist								
(Thailand) 1998	Did not enter								
(South Korea) 2002	Did not enter								
(Qatar) 2006	Did not enter								
(China) 2010	Did not enter								
(South Korea) 2014	Did not enter								
(Indonesia) 2018	Did not enter								
(China) 2022	Semifinals	Fourth place	5	2	0	3	8	22	−14
(Japan) 2026	Quarter-finals	6th place	4	1	2	1	7	9	−2
Total	2/10	Fourth place	9	3	2	4	15	31	−16

*Draws include knockout matches decided on penalty kicks.

=== CAFA Women's Championship ===
CAFA Women's Championship record
Year	Result	GP	W	D*	L	GF	GA	GD
(Uzbekistan) 2018	**Champion**	**4**	**4**	**0**	**0**	**43**	**1**	**+42**
(Tajikistan) 2022	**Champion**	**4**	**4**	**0**	**0**	**20**	**0**	**+20**
**Total**	**2/2**	**8**	**8**	**0**	**0**	**63**	**1**	**+62**

*Draws include knockout matches decided on penalty kicks.

=== Other tournaments ===
==== Turkish Women's Cup ====
(Turkey) Turkish Women's Cup record
Year	Result	GP	W	D	L	GF	GA	GD
2019	4th place	4	2	0	2	13	4	+9
2021	2nd place	3	2	0	1	6	1	+5
2022	3rd place	3	1	1	1	1	2	−1
Total	3/6	10	5	1	4	20	7	+13

==== Yongchuan International Tournament ====
(China) Yongchuan International Tournament record
Year	Result	GP	W	D	L	GF	GA	GD
2016	4th place	3	0	0	3	2	7	-5
Total	1/5	3	0	0	3	2	7	-5

==== Pink Ladies Cup ====
- 2025 Pink Ladies Cup

== See also ==
- Sport in Uzbekistan
- Football in Uzbekistan
- Uzbekistan women's national under-20 football team
- Uzbekistan national football team
- Uzbekistan national futsal team
- Uzbekistan women's national futsal team
