= 2019 Turkish Women's Cup squads =

List of players competing at the 3rd edition of the Turkish Women's Cup

This article lists the squads for the 2019 Turkish Women's Cup, the 3rd edition of the Turkish Women's Cup. The cup consisted of a series of friendly games, and was held in Turkey from 27 February to 5 March 2019. The eight national teams involved in the tournament registered a squad of over 20 players.

The age listed for each player is on 27 February 2019, the first day of the tournament. The numbers of caps and goals listed for each player do not include any matches played after the start of tournament. The club listed is the club for which the player last played a competitive match prior to the tournament. The nationality for each club reflects the national association (not the league) to which the club is affiliated. A flag is included for coaches that are of a different nationality than their own national team.

== Group A ==
=== India ===
Coach: Maymol Rocky

The 24-player squad was announced on 21 February 2019. Crystal Pinto and K Tony Devi were called up as reserve players.

No.	Pos.	Player	Date of birth (age)	Club
1	GK	Aditi Chauhan	20 November 1992 (aged 26)	(All India Football Federation) India Rush
19	GK	Maibam Linthoingambi Devi	2 February 1999 (aged 20)	(All India Football Federation) Eastern Sporting Union
	GK	Sowmiya Narayansamy	25 July 2000 (aged 18)	(All India Football Federation) Sethu
4	DF	Loitongbam Ashalata Devi	3 July 1993 (aged 25)	(All India Football Federation) Sethu
2	DF	Ngangbam Sweety Devi	1 January 1998 (aged 21)	(All India Football Federation) Eastern Sporting Union
3	DF	Jabamani Tudu	10 April 2000 (aged 18)	(All India Football Federation) Rising Students Club
17	DF	Dalima Chhibber	30 August 1997 (aged 21)	(All India Football Federation) Gokulam Kerala
5	DF	Lako Phuti Bhutia	20 October 1994 (aged 24)	(All India Football Federation) Gokulam Kerala
21	DF	Michel Castanha	23 December 1992 (aged 26)	
	DF	Pakpi Devi	1 February 2002 (aged 17)	
6	MF	Sangita Basfore	12 July 1996 (aged 22)	(All India Football Federation) Sashastra Seema Bal
8	MF	Sanju Yadav	12 September 1997 (aged 21)	Unattached
16	MF	Sumithra Kamaraj	5 July 1994 (aged 24)	(All India Football Federation) Sethu
12	MF	Indumathi Kathiresan	5 June 1994 (aged 24)	Unattached
14	MF	Sorokhaibam Ranjana Chanu	10 March 1999 (aged 19)	(All India Football Federation) Gokulam Kerala
22	MF	Grace Lalrampari Hauhnar	20 February 2001 (aged 18)	Unattached
	MF	Sanathokpi Devi		
9	FW	Manisha Kalyan	27 November 2001 (aged 17)	(All India Football Federation) Gokulam Kerala
15	FW	Roja Devi	15 April 2000 (aged 18)	Unattached
10	FW	Anju Tamang	22 December 1995 (aged 23)	Unattached
7	FW	Nongmaithem Ratanbala Devi	2 December 1999 (aged 19)	(All India Football Federation) Sethu
11	FW	Grace Dangmei	5 February 1996 (aged 23)	(All India Football Federation) Sethu
	FW	Renu	16 January 2001 (aged 18)	Unattached
18	FW	Sandhiya Ranganathan	20 May 1996 (aged 22)	(All India Football Federation) Sethu

=== Romania ===
Coach: Mirel Albon

The 20-player squad was announced on 22 February 2019. Erika Geréd withdrew from the squad and was replaced by Cristina Carp.

No.	Pos.	Player	Date of birth (age)	Club
1	GK	Andreea Părăluță	27 November 1994 (aged 24)	(Royal Spanish Football Federation) Levante
2	DF	Olivia Oprea	19 March 1987 (aged 31)	(Royal Spanish Football Federation) Zaragoza
3	DF	Melinda Nagy	4 February 2000 (aged 19)	(Romanian Football Federation) U Olimpia Cluj
4	MF	Ioana Bortan	23 January 1989 (aged 30)	(Romanian Football Federation) U Olimpia Cluj
5	DF	Teodora Meluță	3 August 1999 (aged 19)	(Romanian Football Federation) U Olimpia Cluj
6	DF	Maria Ficzay	8 November 1991 (aged 27)	(Hungarian Football Federation) Diósgyőr
7	DF	Adina Giurgiu	17 August 1994 (aged 24)	(Italian Football Federation) Sassuolo
8	MF	Ștefania Vătafu	12 July 1993 (aged 25)	(Royal Belgian Football Association) Anderlecht
9	FW	Mara Bâtea	12 April 1995 (aged 23)	(Romanian Football Federation) U Olimpia Cluj
10	MF	Andreea Voicu	16 January 1996 (aged 23)	(Cyprus Football Association) Apollon Limassol
11	FW	Florentina Olar (captain)	6 August 1985 (aged 33)	(Danish Football Association) Fortuna Hjørring
12	GK	Sara Câmpean	16 July 2003 (aged 15)	(Romanian Football Federation) U Olimpia Cluj
14	MF	Andrea Herczeg	13 September 1994 (aged 24)	(Swedish Football Association) Kungsbacka DFF
15	DF	Brigitta Gődér	6 May 1992 (aged 26)	(Hungarian Football Federation) Győr
16	MF	Bianca Sandu	22 April 1992 (aged 26)	(Hungarian Football Federation) Diósgyőr
17	FW	Ioana Bălăceanu	11 July 2003 (aged 15)	(Romanian Football Federation) U Olimpia Cluj
18	MF	Beatrice Tărășilă	21 May 1997 (aged 21)	(Romanian Football Federation) U Olimpia Cluj
19	MF	Mihaela Ciolacu	12 August 1998 (aged 20)	(Romanian Football Federation) U Olimpia Cluj
20	FW	Mădălina Marinescu	27 May 2001 (aged 17)	(Romanian Football Federation) Vasas
21	FW	Cristina Carp	28 July 1997 (aged 21)	(Romanian Football Federation) U Olimpia Cluj

=== Turkmenistan ===
Coach: Kamila Mingazow

No.	Pos.	Player	Date of birth (age)	Club
		Ogulbahar Halylowa		(Football Federation of Turkmenistan)
		Mahym Orazmedowa		(Football Federation of Turkmenistan)
		Bagtygül Gurbanowa		(Football Federation of Turkmenistan)
		Merjen Aýydowa		(Football Federation of Turkmenistan)
20	MF	Merjen Bagşyýewa		(Football Federation of Turkmenistan)
		Medina Hydyrowa		(Football Federation of Turkmenistan)
10	FW	Mariýa Çaryýewa		(Football Federation of Turkmenistan)
23	MF	Maya Musaskaya	6 January 2000 (aged 19)	(Football Federation of Turkmenistan)
		Malika Eminowa		(Football Federation of Turkmenistan)
13	GK	Rimma Şepturowa		(Football Federation of Turkmenistan)
9		Gözel Artykowa		(Football Federation of Turkmenistan)
		Patma Beşimowa		(Football Federation of Turkmenistan)
		Şirin Mämmetnazarowa		(Football Federation of Turkmenistan)
		Selbi Kuzmina		(Football Federation of Turkmenistan)
		Halida Eşnyýazowa		(Football Federation of Turkmenistan)
		Kristina Bersenýowa		(Football Federation of Turkmenistan)
		Anželika Şigabutdinowa		(Football Federation of Turkmenistan)
		Aýşa Beşimowa		(Football Federation of Turkmenistan)
		Ejeş Amanmuhammedowa		(Football Federation of Turkmenistan)

=== Uzbekistan ===
Coach: Bakhrom Norsafarov

No.	Pos.	Player	Date of birth (age)	Club
1	GK	Laylo Tilovova	8 March 1997 (aged 21)	
2	FW	Shahnoza Kurbonova	1 May 2000 (aged 18)	
3	DF	Kholida Dadaboeva	12 April 1993 (aged 25)	
4	MF	Nilufar Dadajanova		
5	DF	Tanzilya Zarbieva	8 February 1991 (aged 28)	
6	FW	Feruza Bobokhujaeva	5 October 1999 (aged 19)	
8	MF	Malika Burkhonova	22 February 1999 (aged 20)	
9	MF	Maftuna Shoyimova	1 January 1999 (aged 20)	
10	MF	Rushaniya Safina	25 November 1993 (aged 25)	
11	FW	Nilufar Kudratova	5 June 1997 (aged 21)	
12	GK	Maftuna Jonimqulova	26 July 1999 (aged 19)	
13	MF	Dildora Nozimova	3 November 1997 (aged 21)	
14		Fazilat Bahramova		
15	MF	Umida Zoirova	22 April 1998 (aged 20)	
16		Kamola Berdyeva		
18		Aziz Nazarbayeva		
19	DF	Dilnoza Bektemirova	3 April 1997 (aged 21)	
20		Diora Khabibullayeva		
21	GK	Gulandon Baymatova		
22	DF	Solikha Khusniddinova	22 January 1998 (aged 21)	
23	MF	Maftuna Panjieva	11 September 1999 (aged 19)	
24	DF	Ugiloy Kuchkarova	7 December 1996 (aged 22)	
25	DF	Dilrabo Asadova	22 December 1996 (aged 22)	
26	MF	Kamila Zaripova	19 November 1998 (aged 20)	

== Group B ==
=== France B ===
Coach: Jean-François Niemezcki

The 20-player squad was announced on 1 March 2019.

No.	Pos.	Player	Date of birth (age)	Caps	Club
1	GK	Karima Benameur	13 April 1989 (aged 29)	2	(France) Paris FC
2	DF	Julie Thibaud	20 April 1998 (aged 20)	0	(France) Bordeaux
3	DF	Charlotte Lorgeré (captain)	25 August 1994 (aged 24)	14	(France) Guingamp
4	DF	Perle Morroni	15 October 1997 (aged 21)	10	(France) Paris Saint-Germain
5	DF	Anaïs M'Bassidje	21 September 1993 (aged 25)	3	(France) Soyaux
6	MF	Inès Jaurena	14 May 1991 (aged 27)	12	(France) Paris FC
7	FW	Louise Fleury	8 August 1997 (aged 21)	1	(France) Guingamp
8	MF	Daphné Corboz	14 June 1993 (aged 25)	3	(France) Fleury
9	FW	Marie-Charlotte Léger	13 March 1996 (aged 22)	0	(France) Fleury
10	FW	Clara Matéo	28 November 1997 (aged 21)	10	(France) Paris FC
11	FW	Lindsey Thomas	27 April 1995 (aged 23)	14	(France) Dijon
12	DF	Marine Dafeur	20 October 1994 (aged 24)	7	(France) Lille
13	DF	Marion Romanelli	24 July 1996 (aged 22)	7	(France) Montpellier
14	MF	Justine Rougemont	19 September 1996 (aged 22)	0	(France) Metz
15	MF	Aminata Diallo	3 April 1995 (aged 23)	14	(France) Paris Saint-Germain
16	GK	Élisa Launay	9 September 1997 (aged 21)	4	(France) Lille
17	FW	Léa Khelifi	12 May 1999 (aged 19)	0	(France) Metz
18	MF	Maureen Bigot	3 May 1996 (aged 22)	0	(France) Metz
19	FW	Emelyne Laurent	4 November 1998 (aged 20)	0	(France) Guingamp
20	MF	Anissa Lahmari	17 February 1997 (aged 22)	3	(France) Soyaux

=== Jordan ===
Coach: (Algeria) Azzedine Chih

A 24-player preliminary squad was announced on 23 February 2019. The final 22-player squad was announced two days later.

No.	Pos.	Player	Date of birth (age)	Club
1	GK	Sherin Al-Shalabe	3 June 1994 (aged 24)	
3	DF	Alanoud Ihab	18 May 1999 (aged 19)	
4	MF	Mousa Awwad	2 October 2000 (aged 18)	
5	DF	Anfal Al-Sufy	14 October 1995 (aged 23)	
6		Dina Hinawi		
7	FW	Raya Hina	26 November 1995 (aged 23)	
8	MF	Stephanie Al-Naber (captain)	27 October 1988 (aged 30)	
9	MF	Natasha Al-Naber	15 March 1995 (aged 23)	
10	MF	Sarah Abu-Sabbah	27 October 1999 (aged 19)	(German Football Association) Borussia Mönchengladbach
11	FW	Tala Al-Barghouthy	11 April 2002 (aged 16)	
12	GK	Salma Ghazal	19 October 1998 (aged 20)	(United States Soccer Federation) Texas Southern Tigers
13	DF	Nour Zoqash	1 September 1999 (aged 19)	
14	FW	Leen Al-Btoush	20 July 2001 (aged 17)	
15	MF	Jana Abu Ghosh	8 January 2001 (aged 18)	
16	MF	Shahnaz Jebreen	28 July 1992 (aged 26)	
17	DF	Rouzbahan Fraij	7 April 2000 (aged 18)	
19	DF	Ayah Al-Majali	9 March 1992 (aged 26)	
20	MF	Shorooq Shathli	6 January 1987 (aged 32)	
21	DF	Rand Abu-Hussein	1 March 1997 (aged 21)	
22	GK	Malak Shannak	1 August 1998 (aged 20)	
23	MF	Tasneem Isleem	4 March 2001 (aged 17)	
24	DF	Zaina Hazem	8 July 2004 (aged 14)	

=== Kazakhstan ===
Coach: Razia Nurkenova

The 22-player squad was announced on 12 February 2019.

No.	Pos.	Player	Date of birth (age)	Club
2	DF	Kundyz Kozhakhmet	4 March 1999 (aged 19)	(Kazakhstan Football Federation) DYUSH №17, Kyzylorda
3	MF	Ksenia Khairulina	29 January 1997 (aged 22)	(Kazakhstan Football Federation) BIIK Kazygurt
5	DF	Mariya Demidova	28 August 1996 (aged 22)	(Kazakhstan Football Federation) BIIK Kazygurt
6	MF	Aida Gaistenova	21 May 1994 (aged 24)	(Russian Football Union) Yenisey
7	MF	Kamila Kulmagambetova	16 June 1995 (aged 23)	(Kazakhstan Football Federation) BIIK Kazygurt
9	DF	Bibigul Nurusheva	2 April 1994 (aged 24)	(Kazakhstan Football Federation) Okzhetpes
10	MF	Adilya Vyldanova	19 March 1994 (aged 24)	(Kazakhstan Football Federation) BIIK Kazygurt
11	FW	Saule Karibayeva	23 April 1987 (aged 31)	(Kazakhstan Football Federation) BIIK Kazygurt
13	MF	Svetlana Bortnikova	17 June 1997 (aged 21)	(Kazakhstan Football Federation) BIIK Kazygurt
14	DF	Yekaterina Babshuk	18 September 1991 (aged 27)	(Kazakhstan Football Federation) BIIK Kazygurt
15	DF	Yulia Myasnikova (captain)	13 June 1993 (aged 25)	(Kazakhstan Football Federation) BIIK Kazygurt
17	MF	Karina Zhumabaikyzy	4 August 1996 (aged 22)	(Kazakhstan Football Federation) BIIK Kazygurt
18	GK	Oksana Zheleznyak	13 March 1987 (aged 31)	(Kazakhstan Football Federation) BIIK Kazygurt
20	FW	Arailym Orynbassarova	6 June 2000 (aged 18)	(Kazakhstan Football Federation) RSSHIKOR, Astana
21	MF	Asselkhan Turlybekova	18 December 1998 (aged 20)	(Kazakhstan Football Federation) 7 Shymkent
	GK	Irina Sandalova	17 February 1992 (aged 27)	(Kazakhstan Football Federation) Okzhetpes
	GK	Angelina Portnova	10 February 2001 (aged 18)	(Kazakhstan Football Federation) RSSHIKOR, Astana
	DF	Assem Zhaksymbay	10 February 2000 (aged 19)	(Kazakhstan Football Federation) DYUSSH №2, Aktobe
	MF	Viktoriya Popkova	5 November 1999 (aged 19)	(Kazakhstan Football Federation) 7 Shymkent
	MF	Assemgul Aruova	7 March 2001 (aged 17)	(Kazakhstan Football Federation) RSSHIKOR, Astana
	FW	Aida Smagulova	2 March 2000 (aged 18)	(Kazakhstan Football Federation) RSSHIKOR, Astana
	FW	Karina Adilkhanova	10 January 2000 (aged 19)	(Kazakhstan Football Federation) RSSHIKOR, Astana

=== Northern Ireland ===
Coach: Alfie Wylie

The 22-player squad was announced on 25 February 2019.

No.	Pos.	Player	Date of birth (age)	Club
1	GK	Jackie Burns	6 March 1997 (aged 21)	(United States Soccer Federation) Carson–Newman Eagles
2	DF	Rachel Newborough	19 November 1996 (aged 22)	(United States Soccer Federation) Boston College Eagles
3	DF	Jessica Foy	7 June 1995 (aged 23)	(Irish Football Association) Glentoran
4	MF	Sarah McFadden	23 May 1987 (aged 31)	(The Football Association) Durham
5	DF	Julie Nelson	4 June 1985 (aged 33)	(Irish Football Association) Crusaders Strikers
6	DF	Ashley Hutton	2 November 1987 (aged 31)	(Irish Football Association) Linfield
7	FW	Rebecca McKenna	13 April 2001 (aged 17)	(Irish Football Association) Linfield
8	MF	Marissa Callaghan	2 September 1985 (aged 33)	(Irish Football Association) Cliftonville
9	MF	Rachel Furness	19 June 1988 (aged 30)	(The Football Association) Reading
10	FW	Simone Magill (captain)	1 November 1994 (aged 24)	(The Football Association) Everton
11	DF	Demi Vance	2 May 1991 (aged 27)	(Irish Football Association) Glentoran
12	GK	Becky Flaherty	6 March 1998 (aged 20)	(The Football Association) Everton
13	DF	Emma McMaster	9 March 1999 (aged 19)	(Irish Football Association) Cliftonville
14	DF	Natalie Johnson	12 November 1993 (aged 25)	(The Football Association) Leicester City
15	DF	Freya Holdaway	12 April 1989 (aged 29)	(The Football Association) Crystal Palace
16	MF	Kerry Montgomery	25 March 1988 (aged 30)	(Scottish Football Association) Motherwell
17	MF	Megan Bell	17 April 2001 (aged 17)	(Irish Football Association) Linfield
18	MF	Ciara Sherwood	18 August 1992 (aged 26)	(The Football Association) Crystal Palace
19	FW	Gemma McGuinness	7 August 1995 (aged 23)	(Irish Football Association) Derry City
20	FW	Lauren Wade	22 November 1993 (aged 25)	Unattached
21	MF	Caitlin McGuinness	30 August 2002 (aged 16)	(Irish Football Association) Linfield
22	FW	Louise McDaniel	24 May 2000 (aged 18)	(Irish Football Association) Linfield

== Player representation ==
The information represents only the eight national teams taking part in the competition.

=== By club ===
Clubs with 4 or more players represented are listed.

Players	Club
10	(Kazakhstan) BIIK Kazygurt
9	(Romania) U Olimpia Cluj
6	(India) Sethu
5	(Kazakhstan) RSSHIKOR, Astana, (Northern Ireland) Linfield

=== By club nationality ===
Players	Clubs
21	Kazakhstan
20	France
15	India
11	Northern Ireland
10	Romania
7	England
3	Hungary
2	Spain, United States
1	Belgium, Cyprus, Denmark, Italy, Russia, Scotland, Sweden

=== By club federation ===
Players	Federation
83	UEFA
15	AFC
2	CONCACAF

=== By representatives of domestic league ===
National squad	Players
Kazakhstan	21
France	20
India	15
Northern Ireland	11
Romania	10
