= 2015 Kazakhstani Women's Cup =

Tournament details
- Country: Kazakhstan
- Teams: 6

Final positions
- Champions: BIIK-Kazygurt
- Runners-up: Kokshe

Tournament statistics
- Matches played: 9
- Goals scored: 42 (4.67 per match)
- Top goal scorer(s): Gulnara Gabelia (11 goals)

The Kazakhstani Women's Cup 2015 was the 9th season of the cup competition, Kazakhstan's second-most important title in women's football.

BIIK-Kazygurt won their eighth title after beating Kokshe 6–1 in the final.

== Results ==
=== Group stage ===
==== Group A ====
Team	Pld	W	D	L	GF	GA	GD	Pts
Kokshe	2	2	0	0	8	0	+8	6
BIIK-SDYUCSH №7	2	1	0	1	4	2	+2	3
Umitker	2	0	0	2	0	10	−10	0

3 April 2015
17:00

Kokshe	2 – 0	BIIK-SDYUCSH №7
Kurbanova 48' 56'	report

BIIK Stadium, Shymkent
Attendance: 50
Referee: Zhandos Abzhan (Shymkent)

4 April 2015
17:00

Umitker	0 – 4	BIIK-SDYUCSH №7
	report	Efremova 15'; Bortnikova 37' 90'; Anuar 90 (own goal)

BIIK Stadium, Shymkent
Attendance: 20
Referee: Aibek Tashmetov (Shymkent)

6 April 2015
17:00

Umitker	0 – 6	Kokshe
	report	Kulmagambetova 7'; Penkova 21'; Kurbanova 33' 36' 57'; Nevezhina 71'

BIIK Stadium, Shymkent
Attendance: 40
Referee: Nurkhat Usenbayev (Shymkent)

==== Group B ====
Team	Pld	W	D	L	GF	GA	GD	Pts
BIIK-Kazygurt	2	2	0	0	18	0	+18	6
CSHVSM-Barys	2	1	0	1	2	7	−5	3
ODYCSH №2	2	0	0	2	0	10	−10	0

3 April 2015
17:00

BIIK-Kazygurt	11 – 0	ODYUCSH №2
Khairullina 2' 33'; Babshuk 4'; Idiatullina 7'; Karibayeva 54' 61'; Myasnikova 56' 59'; Gabelia 77' 86'	report

BIIK Stadium, Shymkent
Attendance: 20
Referee: Muratbek Yergeshov (Shymkent)

4 April 2015
17:00

CSHVSM-Barys	2 – 0	ODYUCSH №2
Perme 5'; Abdullayeva 82'	report

BIIK Stadium, Shymkent
Attendance: 40
Referee: Nurkhat Usenbayev (Shymkent)

6 April 2015
17:00

CSHVSM-Barys	0 – 7	BIIK-Kazygurt
	report	Gabelia; Litvinenko 10'; Adule 22'; Karibayeva 49'

BIIK Stadium, Shymkent
Attendance: 100
Referee: Zhandos Abzhan (Shymkent)

=== Match for the 5th place ===
8 April 2015
17:00

Umitker	1 – 1	ODYUCSH №2
Baisarina 62'	report	Vakhitova 84'
Penalties
	4:3

BIIK Stadium, Shymkent
Attendance: 40
Referee: Muratbek Yergeshov (Shymkent)

=== Bronze medal match ===
8 April 2015
17:00

CSHVSM-Barys	1 – 0	BIIK-SDYUCSH №7
Apseitova 33'	report

BIIK Stadium, Shymkent
Attendance: 40
Referee: Aibek Tashmetov (Shymkent)

=== Final ===
8 April 2015
17:00

Kokshe	1–6	BIIK-Kazygurt
Kulmagambetova 41'	Report	Gabelia 16', 72', 82', 88', 90+2'; Adule 68' (pen.)

BIIK Stadium, Shymkent
Attendance: 100
Referee: Furkat Atazhanov (Shymkent)

Kokshe	BIIK-Kazygurt

GK	1	(Kazakhstan) Madina Shoykina
DF	4	(Kazakhstan) Ulpan Pazyl	(substituted off) 72'
DF	17	(Kazakhstan) Valentina Penkova (c)	(substituted off) 80'
MF	21	(Kazakhstan) Aigerim Alimkulova
MF	9	(Kazakhstan) Kamila Kulmagambetova	(yellow card) 12'	41'
MF	14	(Kazakhstan) Yulia Kurbanova
MF	10	(Kazakhstan) Yulia Nikolaenko
MF	8	(Kazakhstan) Yekaterina Pyatkina
MF	55	(Kazakhstan) Zarina Turdiyeva
FW	23	(Armenia) Kristine Mangasaryan
FW	20	(Armenia) Olga Osipyan	(yellow card) 30'	(substituted off) 84'
Substitutions:
GK	22	(Kazakhstan) Irina Sandalova
DF	5	(Kazakhstan) Tamari Nalgiyeva
DF	7	(Kazakhstan) Ainur Zhakhina
DF	18	(Kazakhstan) Aida Gaistenova	(substituted on) 80'
MF	11	(Kazakhstan) Yevgeniya Khatskevich	(substituted on) 84'
MF	12	(Kazakhstan) Marina Nevezhina
MF	13	(Kazakhstan) Symbat Slambekova	(substituted on) 72'
Manager:
Petr Pak

GK	1	(Kazakhstan) Oksana Zheleznyak
DF	5	(United States) Remy Gibba
DF	17	(Kazakhstan) Ulbolsyn Dzholchiyeva (c)
DF	12	(Kazakhstan) Fatima Idiatullina	(substituted off) 87'
DF	15	(Kazakhstan) Yekaterina Krasyukova
DF	18	(Kazakhstan) Yulia Myasnikova
MF	11	(Kazakhstan) Saule Karibayeva		(substituted off) 75'
MF	13	(United States) Jordan Roseboro		(substituted off) 90+1'
FW	7	(Georgia (country)) Gulnara Gabelia	16'	72'	82'	88'	90+2'	(substituted off) 90+2'
FW	9	(Kyrgyzstan) Alina Litvinenko	(substituted off) 51'
FW	20	(Nigeria) Charity Adule	(yellow card) 57'	68'
Substitutions:
GK	35	(Kazakhstan) Aleksandra Grebenyuk
DF	99	(Kazakhstan) Agata Sattarova	(substituted on) 90+2'
MF	8	(Kazakhstan) Aizhan Omirtayeva	(substituted on) 90+1'
MF	10	(Kazakhstan) Adilya Vyldanova		(substituted on) 87'
MF	14	(Kazakhstan) Yekaterina Babshuk	(substituted on) 75'
MF	21	(Kazakhstan) Ksenia Khairullina		(substituted on) 51'
FW	23	(Mexico) Desirée Monsiváis		(substituted on) 73'
Manager:
Kaloyan Petkov

Assistant referees:
Ilashbek Orunbayev (Shymkent)
Bakytzhan Kenzhebayev (Shymkent)
Fourth official:
Yeldos Abzhan (Shymkent)

== Top scorers ==
Final statistics

Rank	Scorer	Club	Goals
1	(Georgia (country)) Gulnara Gabelia	BIIK-Kazygurt	11
2	(Kazakhstan) Yulia Kurbanova	Kokshe	5
3	(Kazakhstan) Saule Karibayeva	BIIK-Kazygurt	3
4	(Kazakhstan) Kamila Kulmagambetova	Kokshe	2
4	(Kazakhstan) Ksenia Khairullina	BIIK-Kazygurt	2
4	(Kazakhstan) Svetlana Bortnikova	BIIK-SDYUCSH №7	2
4	(Kazakhstan) Yulia Myasnikova	BIIK-Kazygurt	2
