= Charity Adule =

Nigerian footballer (born 1993)

Personal information
- Full name: Charity Ogbenyealu Adule
- Date of birth: 7 November 1993 (age 32)
- Place of birth: Warri, Delta State, Nigeria
- Height: 1.61 m (5 ft 3 in)
- Position: Forward

Team information
- Current team: Alhama
- Number: 24

Senior career*
Years	Team	Apps	(Gls)
2006–2011	Rivers Angels		
2011–2014	Bayelsa Queens	40	(57)
2014–2018	BIIK Kazygurt		
2019–2021	Eibar	38	(8)
2021–2022	Deportivo La Coruña	16	(1)
2022–	Alhama	8	(0)

International career
- Nigeria U-20
2013–	Nigeria		
- * Club domestic league appearances and goals as of 18 April 2023

Charity Ogbenyealu Adule (born 7 November 1993) is a Nigerian professional footballer who plays as a forward for Spanish Liga F club Alhama CF and the Nigeria women's national team. At a club level, she has played for Rivers Angels, Bayelsa Queens and BIIK Kazygurt.

== Career ==
=== Club level ===
Adule started her career with the Rivers Angels and debuted at 14 years old at the Female Challenge Cup 2006. Her professional debut was against Pelican Stars, which she later described as the most memorable match of her career. She scored, and Rivers Angels placed third overall in the competition.

In the spring of 2011, she left the Rivers Angels and joined the professional female Football League club Bayelsa Queens in Yenagoa. Adule scored 57 goals in 40 games, for the Bayelsa Queens, and led to her in September 2014 signing a contract with Kazakh champions BIIK Kazygurt. She made her debut for BIIK in the UEFA Women's Champions League on 8 October 2014 against the German FFC Frankfurt.

Over the course of five years at BIIK, Adule won five league titles and reached the Round of 16 of the 2016–17 UEFA Women's Champions League. During the course of the campaign she scored goals against Wexford Youths, Gintra Universitetas, Verona and Paris Saint-Germain.

On 19 September 2019, Adule was announced as a new signing for Spanish side SD Eibar ahead of the 2019–20 season.

=== International ===
Adule played for Nigeria U20 at the 2010 FIFA U-20 Women's World Cup in Germany and the 2012 FIFA U-20 Women's World Cup in Japan. Since 2013, Adule has played for the Nigeria women's national football team.

In November 2018, she revealed she had rejected approaches to represent the Kazakhstan women's national football team. the 24 years old (2018), who’s in the Super Falcons camp in Epe, Lagos, for the 2018 Africa Women Cup of Nations, said for five years, the Kazakh football authorities made several moves to make her pledge loyalty to them but she stood her grounds, hoping to get the chance to represent the Super Falcons someday. Also she was among the squad that lost to the host nation Germany in the U-20 world cup final.

== Honours ==
=== Club ===
BIIK Kazygurt

- Kazakhstani Women's Football Championship (5): 2014, 2015, 2016, 2017, 2018
- Kazakhstan Women's Cup (5): 2014, 2015, 2016, 2017, 2018

== Personal life ==
She is a supporter of London-based men's football club, Chelsea F.C. Adule is religious, and attributes her any plans in her future to God, saying "God has the final say in my life. I believe the Almighty God who made me to be here today will take me to the final place He made for me. Everything in life is all about the favour of God, I believe with His favour upon me, I will go far."
