= Begaim Kirgizbaeva =

Kazakhstani footballer

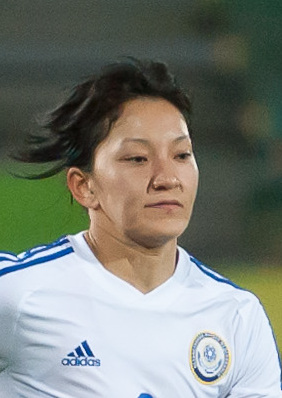

Personal information
- Full name: Begaim Kirgizbaeva
- Date of birth: 15 June 1987 (age 39)
- Place of birth: Korday District, Soviet Union (now Kazakhstan)
- Height: 1.70 m (5 ft 7 in)
- Position: Midfielder

Team information
- Current team: Okzhetpes
- Number: 8

Senior career*
Years	Team	Apps	(Gls)
- Temir Zholy
2004–2009	Alma KTZh		
2009–201?	SShVSM-Kairat		
20??–	Okzhetpes		

International career
2003–	Kazakhstan		
- * Club domestic league appearances and goals

Begaim Kirgizbaeva (born 16 June 1987) is a Kazakhstani footballer who plays as a midfielder for Women's Championship club FC Okzhetpes and the Kazakhstan women's national team. She has previously played for Temir Zholy, Alma KTZh and SShVSM-Kairat Almaty at the UEFA Women's Champions League.

She is a member of the Kazakhstani national team since debuting at 16 in 2003, and currently serves as its captain.

== International goals ==
No.	Date	Venue	Opponent	Score	Result	Competition
1.	18 November 2006	Stadion Kukuš, Strumica, Macedonia	Macedonia	1–0	1–0	UEFA Women's Euro 2009 qualifying
2.	22 September 2011	Kazhymukan Munaitpasov Stadium, Shymkent, Kazakhstan	Turkey	2–0	2–0	UEFA Women's Euro 2013 qualifying
3.	7 May 2014	Astana Arena, Astana, Kazakhstan	Bulgaria	2–0	4–1	2015 FIFA Women's World Cup qualification
4.	7 May 2014	Astana Arena, Astana, Kazakhstan	Bulgaria	3–0	4–1	2015 FIFA Women's World Cup qualification
5.	24 October 2020	Serbian FA Sports Center, Stara Pazova, Serbia	Serbia	1–0	1–4	UEFA Women's Euro 2022 qualifying
6.	12 June 2021	Vazgen Sargsyan Republican Stadium, Yerevan, Armenia	Armenia	2–0	2–1	Friendly
7.	15 June 2021	Vazgen Sargsyan Republican Stadium, Yerevan, Armenia	Armenia	1–0	3–0	Friendly
8.	21 September 2021	Pampeloponnisiako Stadium, Patras, Greece	Greece	1–1	2–3	2023 FIFA Women's World Cup qualification
