= Mariya Yalova =

Kazakhstani footballer (born 1981)

Maria Yalova Мария Ялова
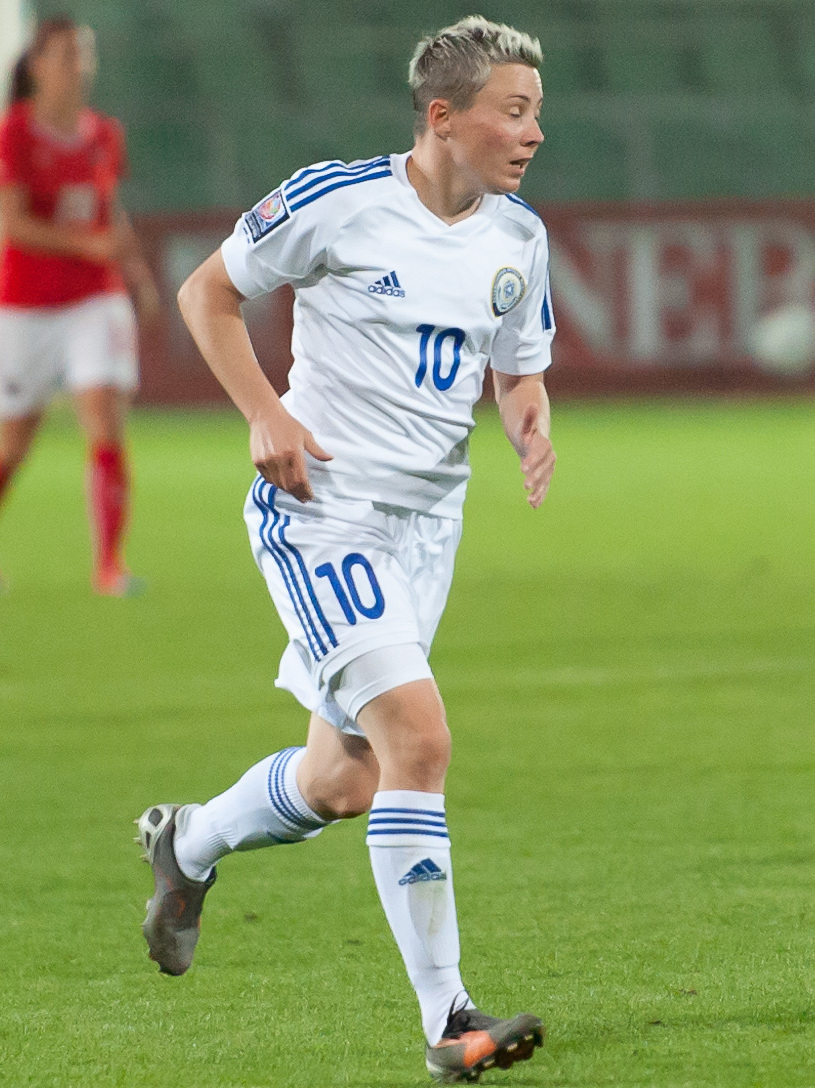
- Yalova in 2014

Personal information
- Full name: Maria Vasilievna Yalova
- Date of birth: 15 November 1981 (age 44)
- Place of birth: Oral, Soviet Union
- Height: 1.55 m (5 ft 1 in)
- Position: Forward

Senior career*
Years	Team	Apps	(Gls)
- Temir Zholy
2009–2010	Universitet Vitebsk		
2010–2014	CSHVSM	24	(51)
2014	BIIK Kazygurt	19	(25)
2015	Kubanochka Krasnodar	9	(2)
2016	Astana	15	(13)

International career
1997–2016	Kazakhstan	51	(23)
- * Club domestic league appearances and goals

Maria Vasilievna Yalova (Kazakh: Мария Васильевна Ялова; born 15 November 1981) is a Kazakhstani former footballer who played as a forward. She capped for the Kazakhstan women's national team. She has also played for Temir Zholy, CSHVSM and BIIK Kazygurt in the Kazakhstani Championship, for Universitet Vitebsk in the Belarusian Premier League and for Kubanochka in the Russian Championship.

== International goals ==
No.	Date	Venue	Opponent	Score	Result	Competition
1.	7 November 1999	Panaad Stadium, Bacolod, Philippines	Hong Kong	?–0	8–0	1999 AFC Women's Championship
2.	7 November 1999	Panaad Stadium, Bacolod, Philippines	Hong Kong	?–0	8–0	1999 AFC Women's Championship
3.	7 November 1999	Panaad Stadium, Bacolod, Philippines	Hong Kong	?–0	8–0	1999 AFC Women's Championship
4.	15 November 1999	Panaad Stadium, Bacolod, Philippines	Guam	?–0	8–0	1999 AFC Women's Championship
5.	15 November 1999	Panaad Stadium, Bacolod, Philippines	Guam	?–0	8–0	1999 AFC Women's Championship
6.	15 November 1999	Panaad Stadium, Bacolod, Philippines	Guam	?–0	8–0	1999 AFC Women's Championship
7.	15 November 1999	Panaad Stadium, Bacolod, Philippines	Guam	?–0	8–0	1999 AFC Women's Championship
8.	15 November 1999	Panaad Stadium, Bacolod, Philippines	Guam	?–0	8–0	1999 AFC Women's Championship
9.	24 August 2003	Pärnu Kalevi Staadion, Pärnu, Estonia	Estonia	1–0	2–3	UEFA Women's Euro 2005 qualifying
10.	30 May 2004	Herzliya, Israel	Israel	1–1	1–3	UEFA Women's Euro 2005 qualifying
11.	25 August 2004	Traktor Stadium, Minsk, Belarus	Belarus	1–5	1–8	UEFA Women's Euro 2005 qualifying
12.	27 August 2005	Stadionul Poiana, Câmpina, Romania	Romania	1–1	1–4	2007 FIFA Women's World Cup qualification
13.	23 November 2006	Stadion Mladost, Strumica, Macedonia	Macedonia	1–1	1–2	UEFA Women's Euro 2009 qualifying
14.	29 October 2009	Zhetysu Stadium, Taldykorgan, Kazakhstan	Republic of Ireland	1–0	1–2	2011 FIFA Women's World Cup qualification
15.	23 June 2010	Shakhtyor Stadium, Karagandy, Kazakhstan	Switzerland	1–1	2–4	2011 FIFA Women's World Cup qualification
16.	23 June 2010	Shakhtyor Stadium, Karagandy, Kazakhstan	Switzerland	2–2	2–4	2011 FIFA Women's World Cup qualification
17.	19 September 2012	Shakhtyor Stadium, Karagandy, Kazakhstan	Switzerland	1–0	1–0	UEFA Women's Euro 2013 qualifying
18.	7 May 2014	Astana Arena, Astana, Kazakhstan	Bulgaria	4–1	4–1	2015 FIFA Women's World Cup qualification
19.	17 September 2014	Waldstadion, Pasching, Austria	Austria	1–2	1–5	2015 FIFA Women's World Cup qualification
20.	2 June 2016	BIIK Stadium, Shymkent, Kazakhstan	Israel	1–0	1–0	UEFA Women's Euro 2017 qualifying

== Career statistics ==
=== Club ===
Club	Season	Division	League		Cup		Continental		Total	
Club	Season	Division	Apps	Goals	Apps	Goals	Apps	Goals	Apps	Goals
Universitek Vitebsk	2009	Belarus Women's League					2	2	2	2
CSHVSM	2010	Kazakhstan Women's League					2	0	2	0
CSHVSM	2013	Kazakhstan Women's League	24	51	2	0	2	0	28	51
CSHVSM	Total		24	51	2	0	4	0	30	51
BIIK Shymkent	2014	Kazakhstan Women's League	19	25			1	0	20	25
Kubanochka Krasnodar	2015	Russian Women's League	9	2					9	2
Astana	2016	Kazakhstan Women's League	15	13	4	2			19	15
Total career			67	91	6	2	7	2	80	95
