= Brooke Denesik =

American soccer player (born 1996)

Personal information
- Full name: Brooke Gabrielle Denesik
- Date of birth: November 6, 1996 (age 29)
- Place of birth: Telluride, Colorado, U.S.
- Height: 5 ft 5 in (1.65 m)
- Position: Defender

Youth career
- Sereno SC

College career
Years	Team	Apps	(Gls)
2015–2018	Texas Tech Red Raiders	81	(1)

Senior career*
Years	Team	Apps	(Gls)
2019–2022	BIIK Kazygurt		
2022–2023	MSV Duisburg	13	(0)
2024	AaB	8	(0)
2024–2025	Tampa Bay Sun	1	(0)

International career^{‡}
2019	United States U23	1	(0)
- * Club domestic league appearances and goals as of 23:51, June 12, 2026 (UTC) ‡ National team caps and goals as of 23:51, June 12, 2026 (UTC)

Brooke Gabrielle Denesik (born November 6, 1996) is an American professional soccer player who plays as a defender. She played college soccer for the Texas Tech Red Raiders. She has previously played for Kazakhstani club BIIK Kazygurt, German club MSV Duisburg, Danish club AaB, and USL Super League club Tampa Bay Sun FC.

== Early life ==
Denesik was born in Telluride, Colorado, as one of two daughters born to John and Debra Denesik. When Denesik was in third grade, her family sold their optical business in Telluride and moved to the Phoenix metropolitan area in order to give the Denesik children more access to advanced youth sports. Denesik spent the rest of her youth in Anthem, Arizona. She played club soccer for Phoenix-based team Sereno SC, contributing to an ECNL national championship in 2013. She also played prep soccer for Boulder Creek High School, where, she helped her school to two state semifinals and earned second team all-state honors as a junior and a senior.

== College career ==
Three games into her freshman season with the Texas Tech Red Raiders, Denesik earned a starting spot on the team. She helped the Red Raiders' defense earn 11 shutouts, which ranked second in the Big 12 Conference, en route to Texas Tech's first-ever Big 12 tournament title and a trip to the NCAA tournament Round of 32. As a sophomore in 2016, she continued to earn minutes, coming in as a substitute in only one of her 18 appearances. Denesik then went on to co-captain the team for the next two years, starting in all 31 of Texas Tech's matches in that span. In her junior year, she scored her only collegiate goal, the equalizer against West Virginia on October 19, 2017.

As a senior, Denesik guided the Red Raiders to reach the NCAA Round of 16 before being eliminated by Virginia on penalties. Her performances throughout 2018 earned her the accolade of Texas Tech Defensive MVP. Throughout her college career, Denesik also shone academically; she was thrice named to the Academic All-Big 12 first team and was the only senior on Texas Tech with a perfect GPA.

== Club career ==
Denesik entered her name into the 2019 NWSL Draft, but was not selected by any team. Instead, she signed her first professional contract with Kazakhstani serial champions BIIK Kazygurt in March 2019. That same year, she recorded her first goal contribution in the UEFA Women's Champions League, assisting Alina Litvinenko in a victory over Estonian side FC Flora. Denesik went on to spend three seasons with Kazygurt, racking up 12 total Champions League appearances in addition to domestic play.

Denesik then moved to German club MSV Duisburg in 2022, joining the team for Duisburg's first season back in the top-division Frauen-Bundesliga after getting promoted the previous season. She played in 13 games for the club after making her Bundesliga debut against SV Meppen on 27 November 2022. In her second season in Germany, Denesik missed the majority of the campaign due to personal reasons. MSV Duisburg terminated Denesik's contract early in November 2023.

The following year, Denesik moved to Aalborg and joined Danish top-flight club AaB. She appeared in 8 Danish Women's League matches before leaving at the end of the season.

In June 2024, Denesik was signed Tampa Bay Sun FC ahead of the inaugural USL Super League season. She made her Super League debut on August 19, 2024, coming on as a second-half substitute for Domi Richardson in Tampa Bay's inaugural match, a draw with the Dallas Trinity. She was rostered on the bench in the Sun's following fixture before not being included in any further matches for the club. After winning the inaugural league championship with Tampa Bay, Denesik departed from the club at the end of the season.

== International career ==
While playing for BIIK Kazygurt in August 2019, Denesik earned her first youth international call-up, receiving an invitation to the United States under-23 national team. In her U23 debut, the United States' opening game of the Nordic Tournament, she assisted Simone Charley in a 2–0 victory over Norway.

== Honors ==
Texas Tech Red Raiders

- Big 12 Conference women's soccer tournament: 2015

BIIK Kazygurt

- Kazakhstani women's football championship: 2019, 2020, 2021
- Kazakhstani Women's Cup: 2019, 2021

Tampa Bay Sun FC

- USL Super League: 2024–25
