= Kundyz Kozhakhmet =

Kazakhstani footballer

Personal information
- Full name: Құндыз Қайырбекқызы Қожахмет
- Date of birth: 4 March 1999 (age 27)
- Height: 1.65 m (5 ft 5 in)
- Position: Defender

Team information
- Current team: Okzhetpes
- Number: 5

Senior career*
Years	Team	Apps	(Gls)
- Okzhetpes

International career^{‡}
- Kazakhstan
- * Club domestic league appearances and goals as of 19:41, 30 August 2019 (UTC) ‡ National team caps and goals as of 19:41, 30 August 2019 (UTC)

Kundyz Kozhakhmet (Russian: Кундыз Қайырбекқызы Кожахмет; born 4 March 1999) is a Kazakhstani footballer who plays as a defender for Women's Championship club FC Okzhetpes and the Kazakhstan women's national team.

== Career ==
Kozhakhmet has been capped for the Kazakhstan national team, appearing for the team during the 2019 FIFA Women's World Cup qualifying cycle.
