= Adilya Vyldanova =

Kazakhstani footballer

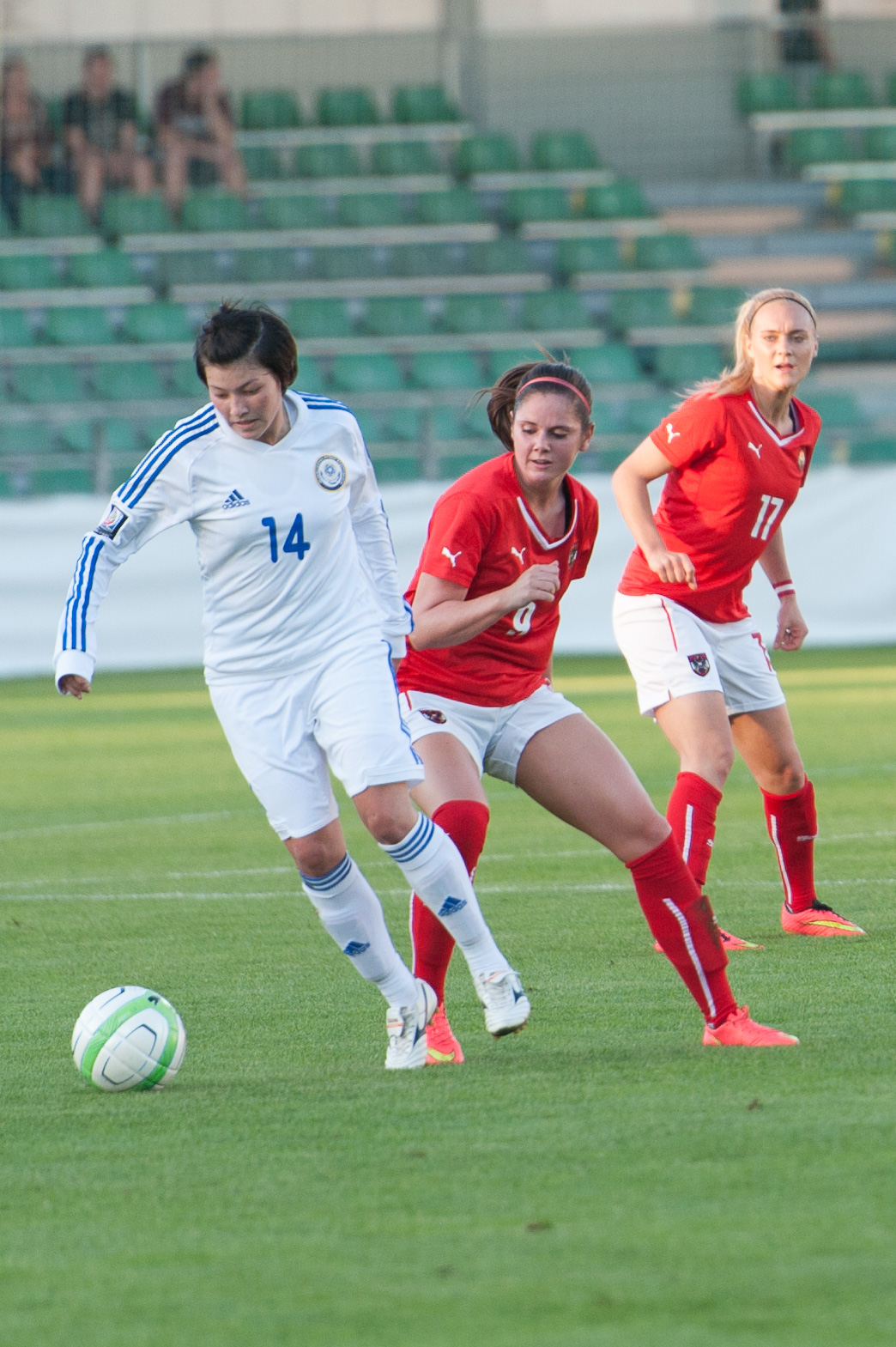
- Adilya Vyldanova (left) in 2015

Personal information
- Date of birth: 19 March 1994 (age 32)
- Position: Midfielder

Team information
- Current team: Okzhetpes
- Number: 24

Senior career*
Years	Team	Apps	(Gls)
- BIIK Kazygurt
- Okzhetpes

International career^{‡}
- Kazakhstan
- * Club domestic league appearances and goals as of 19:40, 30 August 2019 (UTC) ‡ National team caps and goals as of 19:40, 30 August 2019 (UTC)

Adilya Vyldanova (Russian: Адиля Вылданова; born 19 March 1994) is a Kazakhstani footballer who plays as a midfielder for Women's Championship club FC Okzhetpes and the Kazakhstan women's national team.

== Career ==
Vyldanova has been capped for the Kazakhstan national team, appearing for the team during the 2019 FIFA Women's World Cup qualifying cycle.
