= Anastasia Vlasova =

Anastasia Vlasova may refer to:

- Anastasia Vlasova (journalist), Ukrainian photographer and journalist
- Anastasia Vlasova (skier), Russian skier
- Anastassiya Vlassova (born 1996), Kazakhstani footballer
