= Madina Zhanatayeva =

Kazakhstani footballer

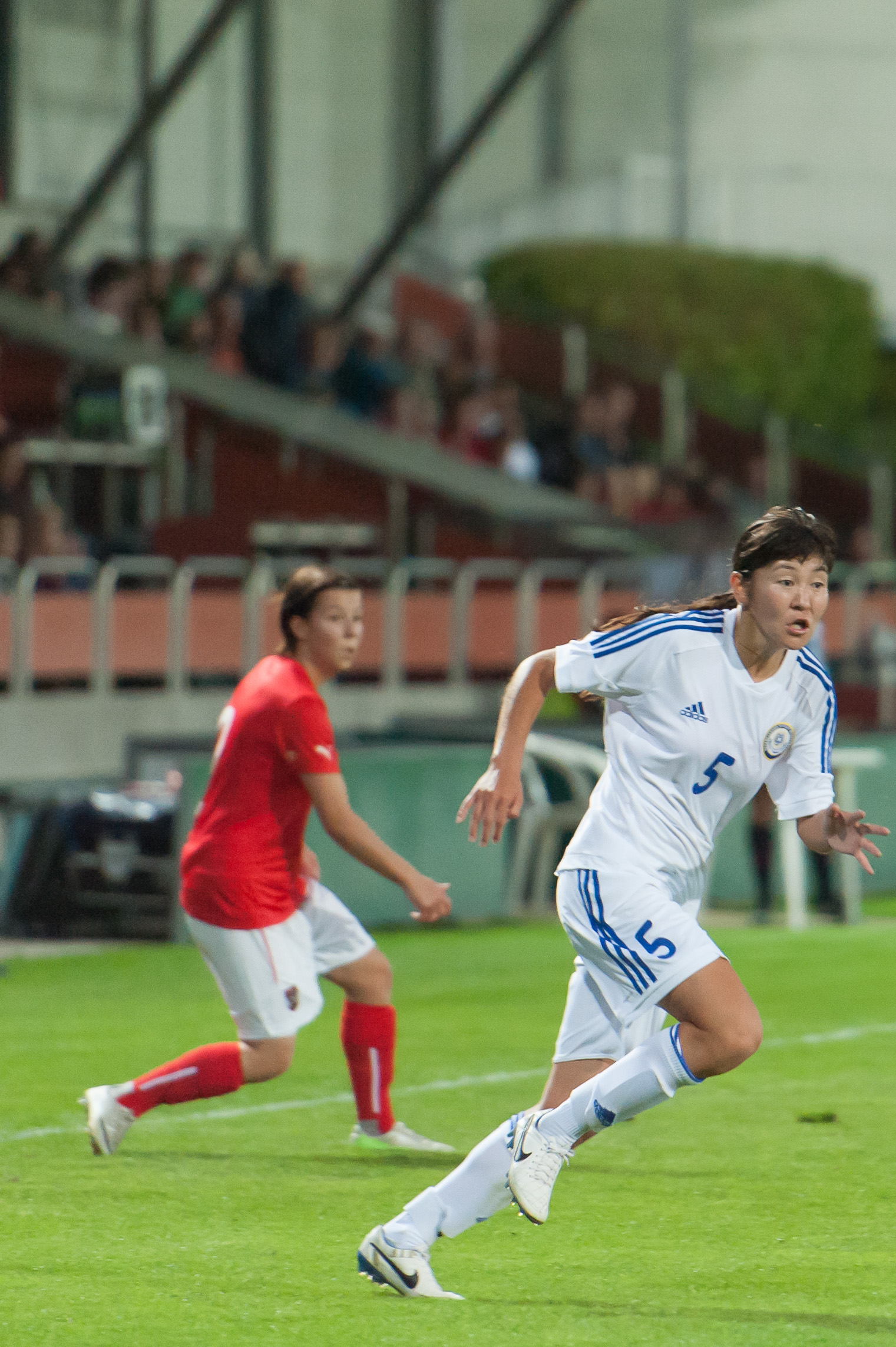

Personal information
- Full name: Madina Zhanatayeva
- Date of birth: 3 May 1991 (age 35)
- Place of birth: Kazakhstan
- Height: 1.72 m (5 ft 7 1/2 in)
- Position: Midfielder

Team information
- Current team: BIIK Kazygurt
- Number: 23

Senior career*
Years	Team	Apps	(Gls)
2009–2014	BIIK Kazygurt		
2015	Kubanochka Krasnodar		
2015–	BIIK Kazygurt		

International career^{‡}
2009–	Kazakhstan	25	(1)
- * Club domestic league appearances and goals as of 09:41, 5 April 2015 (UTC) ‡ National team caps and goals as of 09:41, 5 April 2015 (UTC)

Madina Zhanatayeva (born 3 May 1991) is a Kazakhstani professional footballer who plays as a midfielder for BIIK Kazygurt and the Kazakhstan national team.
