= Madina Shoikina =

Kazakhstani footballer

Personal information
- Date of birth: 31 January 1986 (age 40)
- Position: Goalkeeper

Senior career*
| Years | Team | Apps | (Gls) |
- Alma
- BIIK-Kazygurt

International career^{‡}
| 2009–2016 | Kazakhstan | 9 | (0) |
- * Club domestic league appearances and goals ‡ National team caps and goals as of 15 September 2016

Madina Shoikina (Kazakh: Мадина Шойкина; born 31 January 1986) is a Kazakhstani footballer who plays as a goalkeeper. She has been a member of the Kazakhstan national team.
