= Saule Karibayeva =

Kazakhstani footballer

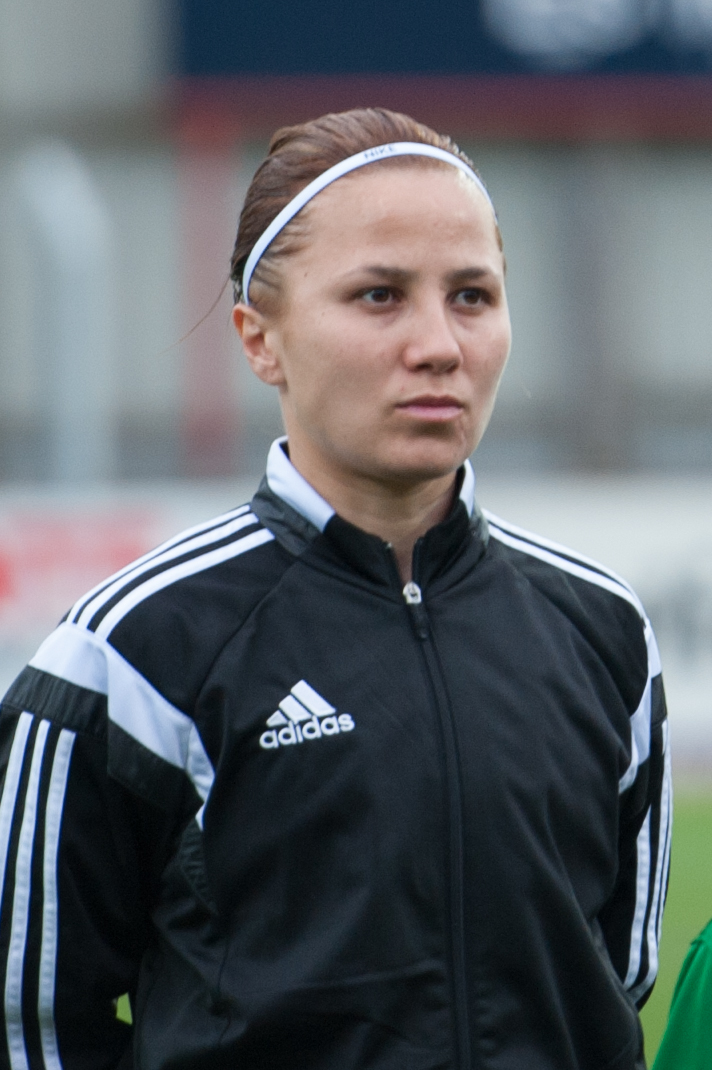
- Saule Karibayeva 2016

Personal information
- Full name: Saule Maratovna Karibayeva
- Date of birth: 23 April 1987 (age 39)
- Place of birth: Almaty, Soviet Union (now Kazakhstan)
- Height: 1.58 m (5 ft 2 in)
- Position: Forward

Team information
- Current team: BIIK Kazygurt
- Number: 11

Senior career*
| Years | Team | Apps | (Gls) |
- Alma KTZh
- BIIK Kazygurt

International career
| 2004– | Kazakhstan | 49+ | (1) |
- * Club domestic league appearances and goals

Saule Maratovna Karibayeva (Kazakh: Сәуле Кәрібаева, Säule Kärıbaeva; born 23 April 1987) is a Kazakhstani women's football striker currently playing for BIIK Shymkent in the Kazakhstani Championship. She has also played the Champions League with Alma KTZh, and she has been a member of the Kazakhstani national team since debuting at 17 in 2004.
