= Ksenia Khairulina =

Kazakhstani footballer

Personal information
- Date of birth: 29 January 1997 (age 29)
- Height: 1.62 m (5 ft 4 in)
- Position: Midfielder

Senior career*
Years	Team	Apps	(Gls)
- BIIK Kazygurt

International career^{‡}
- Kazakhstan
- * Club domestic league appearances and goals as of 19:41, 30 August 2019 (UTC) ‡ National team caps and goals as of 19:41, 30 August 2019 (UTC)

Ksenia Khairulina (Russian: Ксения Хайрулина; born 29 January 1997) is a Kazakhstani footballer who plays as a midfielder and has appeared for the Kazakhstan women's national team.

== Career ==
Khairulina has been capped for the Kazakhstan national team, appearing for the team during the 2019 FIFA Women's World Cup qualifying cycle.
