= Raziya Nurkenova =

Kazakhstani football manager (born 1974)

Personal information
- Full name: Raziya Tuleanova Nurkenova
- Date of birth: 4 May 1968
- Place of birth: Kazakhstan
- Date of death: 18 August 2020 (aged 52)
- Place of death: Kazakhstan

Managerial career
- Years: Team
- 2009–2018: CSK VVS
- 2018–2020: Kazakhstan

Raziya Tuleanova Nurkenova (4 May 1968 – 18 August 2020; Russian: Разия Нуркенова) was a football manager. Born in Kazakhstan, she was a Russia international.

== Early life ==
Nurkenova played handball as a child. She attended the Karaganda Pedagogical Institute in Kazakhstan.

== Career ==
Nurkenova started her managerial career with Russian side CSK VVS. She was described as "managed to assemble a combat-ready team from her students, which performed well in the first division". In 2018, she was appointed manager of the Kazakhstan women's national football team.

== Personal life ==
Nurkenova was the daughter of Nakysh Kabdollakizy. She had seven older siblings.
