= Karina Zhumabaikyzy =

Kazakhstani footballer (born 1996)

Personal information
- Date of birth: 4 August 1996 (age 30)
- Place of birth: Kazakhstan
- Height: 1.71 m (5 ft 7 in)
- Position: Midfielder

Team information
- Current team: Ryazan-VDV

Senior career*
Years	Team	Apps	(Gls)
- BIIK Kazygurt
2022–	Ryazan-VDV	0	(0)

International career^{‡}
- Kazakhstan
- * Club domestic league appearances and goals as of 19:41, 30 August 2019 (UTC) ‡ National team caps and goals as of 19:41, 30 August 2019 (UTC)

Karina Zhumabaikyzy (Kazakh: Карина Жұмабайқызы; born 4 August 1996) is a Kazakhstani footballer who plays as a midfielder and has appeared for the Kazakhstan women's national team.

== Career ==
Zhumabaikyzy has been capped for the Kazakhstan national team, appearing for the team during the 2019 FIFA Women's World Cup qualifying cycle.
