= Kamila Kulmagambetova =

Kazakhstani footballer (born 1995)

Kamila Kulmagambetova Камила Құлмағамбетова
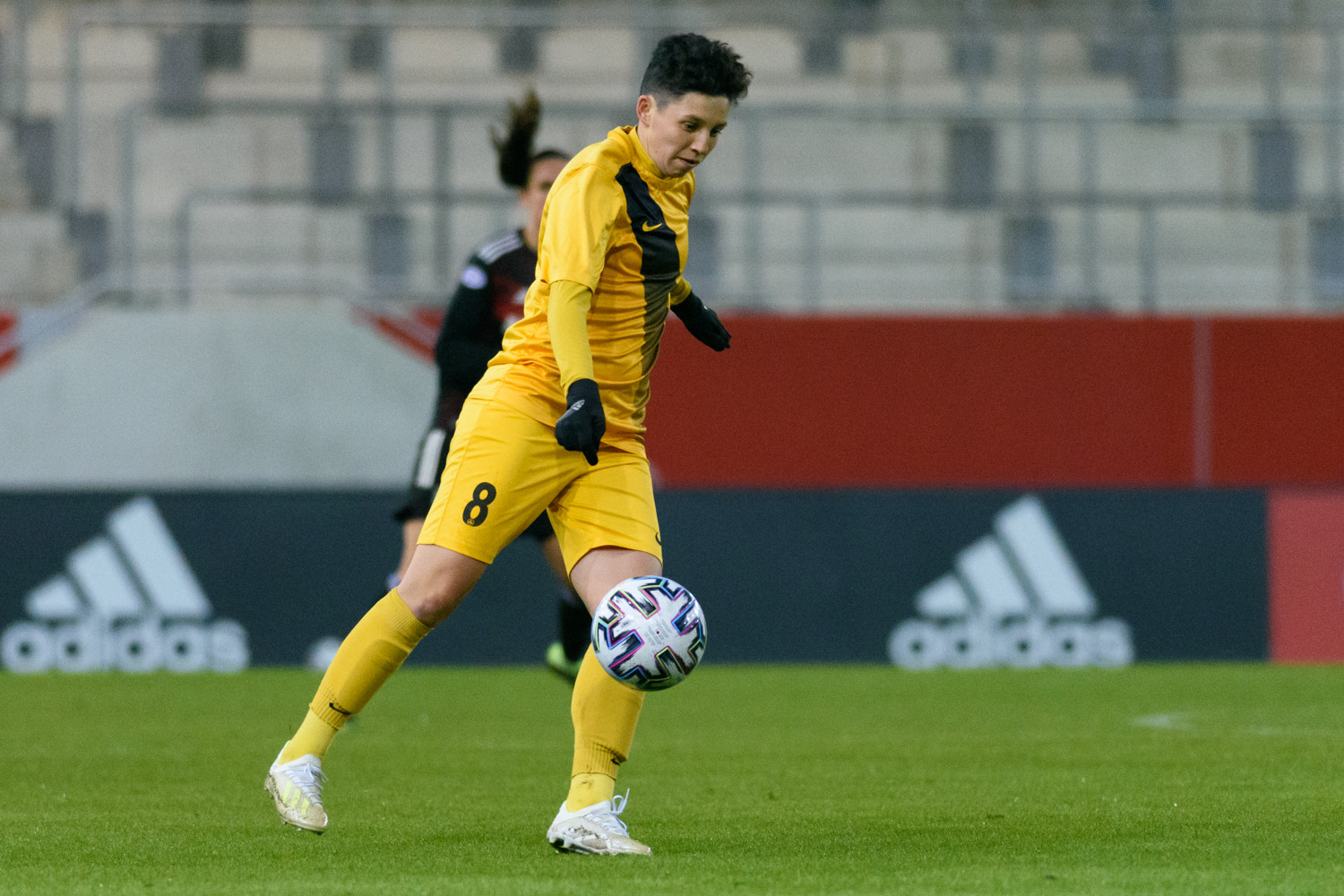
- Kulmagambetova with BIIK Kazygurt in 2021

Personal information
- Full name: Kamila Erlanovna Kulmagambetova
- Date of birth: 16 June 1995 (age 31)
- Place of birth: Alma-Ata, Kazakhstan
- Height: 1.68 m (5 ft 6 in)
- Position: Midfielder

Team information
- Current team: Vorskla Poltava

Senior career*
Years	Team	Apps	(Gls)
2013–2015	Okzhetpes	57	(27)
2016–20??	BIIK Kazygurt	15+	(3+)
20??–	Vorskla Poltava		

International career^{‡}
2012–2014	Kazakhstan U19	12	(0)
2015–	Kazakhstan	13	(0)
- * Club domestic league appearances and goals as of 19:40, 30 August 2019 (UTC) ‡ National team caps and goals as of 19:40, 30 August 2019 (UTC)

Kamila Erlanovna Kulmagambetova (Kazakh: Камила Ерланқызы Құлмағамбетова, Kamila Erlanqyzy Kūlmağambetova; born 16 June 1995) is a Kazakhstani footballer who plays as a midfielder for Ukrainian club Vorskla Poltava and the Kazakhstan women's national team.

== Career ==
Kulmagambetova has been capped for the Kazakhstan national team, appearing for the team during the 2019 FIFA Women's World Cup qualifying cycle.
