= Yekaterina Krasyukova =

Kazakhstani footballer (born 1980)

Personal information
- Date of birth: 20 June 1980 (age 46)
- Position: Defender

Team information
- Current team: BIIK Kazygurt
- Number: 15

Senior career*
Years	Team	Apps	(Gls)
- BIIK Kazygurt

International career^{‡}
- Kazakhstan
- * Club domestic league appearances and goals as of 19:41, 30 August 2019 (UTC) ‡ National team caps and goals as of 19:41, 30 August 2019 (UTC)

Yekaterina Krasyukova (Russian: Екатерина Красюкова; born 20 June 1980) is a Kazakhstani footballer who plays as a defender and has appeared for the Kazakhstan women's national team.

== Career ==
Krasyukova has been capped for the Kazakhstan national team, appearing for the team during the 2019 FIFA Women's World Cup qualifying cycle.
