= Irina Sandalova =

Kazakhstani footballer

Personal information
- Date of birth: 17 February 1992 (age 34)
- Position: Goalkeeper

Senior career*
Years	Team	Apps	(Gls)
- Voskhod

International career^{‡}
2017–	Kazakhstan	2	(0)
- * Club domestic league appearances and goals as of 19:40, 30 August 2019 (UTC) ‡ National team caps and goals as of 19:40, 30 August 2019 (UTC)

Irina Sandalova (Russian: Ирина Сандалова; born 17 February 1992) is a Kazakhstani footballer who plays as a goalkeeper for Ukrainian club Voskhod and the Kazakhstan women's national team.

== Career ==
Sandalova has been capped for the Kazakhstan national team, appearing for the team during the 2019 FIFA Women's World Cup qualifying cycle. She is nowadays considered as the second best goalkeeper in her country. She became famous after making 10 saves against France, on 1 December 2020, during Kazakhstan's 12–0 loss. She blocked attempts from some of women's football's biggest names such as Amel Majri.
