= Gulnara Gabelia =

Georgian footballer

Personal information
- Full name: Gulnara Gabelia
- Date of birth: 30 May 1985 (age 41)
- Place of birth: Senaki, Soviet Union (now Georgia)
- Height: 1.58 m (5 ft 2 in)
- Position: Striker

Team information
- Current team: BIIK Shymkent
- Number: 7

Senior career*
Years	Team	Apps	(Gls)
- Norchi Dinamoeli
2009-	BIIK Shymkent	166	(347)

International career
2011–2019	Georgia	18	(2)
- * Club domestic league appearances and goals

Gulnara Gabelia is a Georgian football striker currently playing in the Kazakhstani Championship for BIIK Kazygurt. She previously for in her country for Norchi Dinamoeli, with which she made her Champions League debut in July 2009. She is a member of the Georgian national team.

== Career statistics ==
Club	Season	Division	League		Cup		Continental		Other		Total	
Club	Season	Division	Apps	Goals	Apps	Goals	Apps	Goals	Apps	Goals	Apps	Goals
Dinamo Tbilisi	2010-2011	Georgia women's football championship					3	0			3	0
BIIK Shymkent	2012	Kazakhstan women's football championship					1	0			1	0
BIIK Shymkent	2013	Kazakhstan women's football championship	24	58	3	9			1	1	28	68
BIIK Shymkent	2014	Kazakhstan women's football championship	19	48			2	1			21	49
BIIK Shymkent	2015	Kazakhstan women's football championship	16	30	2	9	2	1			20	40
BIIK Shymkent	2016	Kazakhstan women's football championship	15	22	3	4	7	7			25	33
BIIK Shymkent	2017	Kazakhstan women's football championship	16	19			7	3			23	22
BIIK Shymkent	2018	Kazakhstan women's football championship					5	3			5	3
BIIK Shymkent	2019	Kazakhstan women's football championship					6	5			6	5
BIIK Shymkent	2020	Kazakhstan women's football championship					4	0			4	0
BIIK Shymkent	2021	Kazakhstan women's football championship	20	32			2	0			22	32
BIIK Shymkent	2022	Kazakhstan women's football championship					2	1			2	1
BIIK Shymkent	2023	Kazakhstan women's football championship					2	1			2	1
BIIK Shymkent	2024	Kazakhstan women's football championship	12	23	4	8	2	2			20	32
BIIK Shymkent	2025	Kazakhstan women's football championship	26	70			4	1			30	71
BIIK Shymkent	2026	Kazakhstan women's football championship	18	45							18	45
BIIK Shymkent	Total		166	347	12	30	46	25	1	1	225	403
Total career			166	347	12	30	49	25	1	1	228	403
