= Svetlana Bortnikova =

Kazakhstani footballer (born 1997)

Svetlana Bortnikova Светлана Бортникова
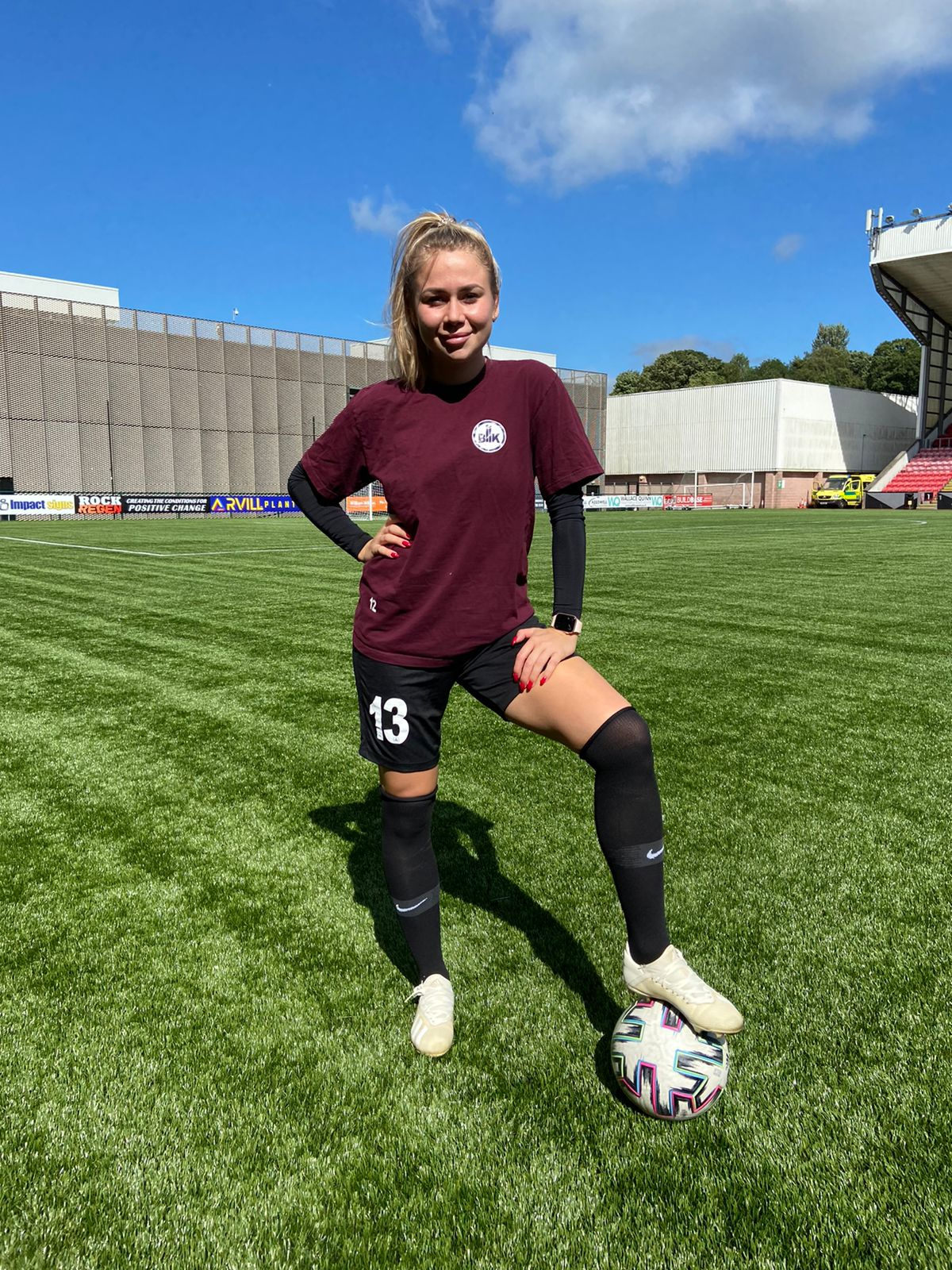
- Bortnikova with BIIK Shymkent in 2021

Personal information
- Full name: Svetlana Dmitrievna Bortnikova
- Date of birth: 17 June 1997 (age 29)
- Place of birth: Shymkent, Kazakhstan
- Height: 1.69 m (5 ft 7 in)
- Position: Midfielder

Team information
- Current team: BIIK Shymkent
- Number: 13

Senior career*
Years	Team	Apps	(Gls)
2013–2015	BIIK SDYUSSH № 7	57	(32)
2016–	BIIK Kazygurt	19	(9)

International career^{‡}
2013–2016	Kazakhstan U19	12	(2)
2017–	Kazakhstan	23	(3)
- * Club domestic league appearances and goals as of 19:10, 30 August 2019 (UTC) ‡ National team caps and goals as of 4 June 2024 (UTC)

Svetlana Dmitrievna Bortnikova (Kazakh: Светлана Дмитриевна Бортникова; born 17 June 1997) is a Kazakhstani footballer who plays as a midfielder for BIIK Shymkent and the Kazakhstan national team.

== Career ==
Bortnikova has been capped for the Kazakhstan national team, appearing for the team during the 2019 FIFA Women's World Cup qualifying cycle.

== International goals ==
No.	Date	Venue	Opponent	Score	Result	Competition
1.	15 June 2021	Vazgen Sargsyan Republican Stadium, Yerevan, Armenia	Armenia	2–0	3–0	Friendly
2.	21 September 2021	Pampeloponnisiako Stadium, Patras, Greece	Greece	1–1	2–3	2023 FIFA Women's World Cup qualification
3.	28 June 2022	Pärnu Rannastaadion, Pärnu, Estonia	Estonia	2–0	2–4	2023 FIFA Women's World Cup qualification
