= Yulia Myasnikova =

Kazakhstani footballer (born 1993)

Yulia Myasnikova Юлия Мясникова
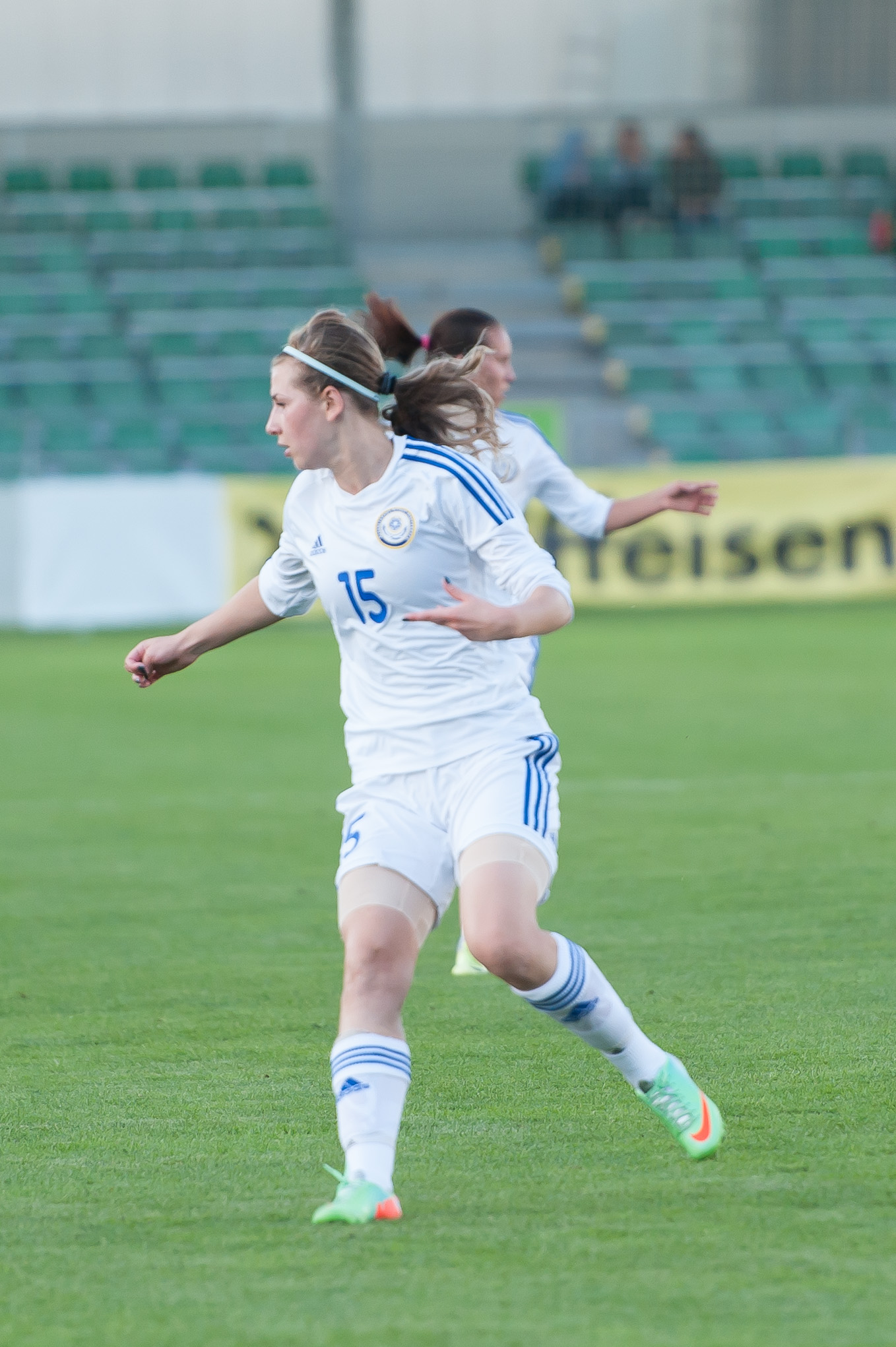
- Myasnikova with Kazakhstan in 2014

Personal information
- Full name: Yulia Vladislavovna Myasnikova
- Date of birth: 13 June 1993 (age 33)
- Place of birth: Karaganda, Kazakhstan
- Height: 1.77 m (5 ft 10 in)
- Position: Defender

Team information
- Current team: CSKA Moscow
- Number: 15

Senior career*
Years	Team	Apps	(Gls)
- Shakhter Karagandy
2009–2019	BIIK Kazygurt		
2019–	CSKA Moscow	37	(3)

International career
2010–	Kazakhstan	37	(2)
- * Club domestic league appearances and goals

Yulia Vladislavovna Myasnikova (Kazakh: Юлия Владиславовна Мясникова; born 13 June 1993) is a Kazakhstani footballer who plays as a defender for Russian Women's Football Championship club CSKA Moscow and the Kazakhstan women's national team.

Myasnikova has played the UEFA Women's Champions League for CSKA Moscow.

== International goals ==
No.	Date	Venue	Opponent	Score	Result	Competition
1.	2 October 2019	Petar Miloševski Training Centre, Skopje, North Macedonia	North Macedonia	1–3	1–4	UEFA Women's Euro 2022 qualifying
