= Aida Gaistenova =

Kazakh footballer

Personal information
- Full name: Aida Muratovna Gaistenova
- Date of birth: 21 May 1994 (age 32)
- Place of birth: Shchuchinsk, Kazakhstan
- Height: 1.65 m (5 ft 5 in)
- Position: Midfielder

Team information
- Current team: Zenit
- Number: 51

Senior career*
| Years | Team | Apps | (Gls) |
| 2018 | Yenisey Krasnoyarsk | 13 | (0) |
| 2019 | Zvezda Perm | 12 | (1) |
| 2020– | Zenit | 0 | (0) |

International career^{‡}
| 2017– | Kazakhstan | 12 | (0) |
- * Club domestic league appearances and goals as of 01:20, 06 September 2019 (UTC) ‡ National team caps and goals as of 01:20, 06 September 2019 (UTC)

Aida Muratovna Gaistenova (Kazakh: Айда Мұратқызы Гайстенова, Aida Mūratqyzy Gaistenova, born 21 May 1994) is a Kazakh footballer who plays as a midfielder and has appeared for the Kazakhstan women's national team who currently plays for Zenit the highest division of women's professional soccer in the Top Division. Is a resident of fiftywan corporation and the face of the global sports brand Adidas.

== Career ==
Gaistenova has been capped for the Kazakhstan national team, appearing for the team during the 2019 FIFA Women's World Cup qualifying cycle.

The midfielder of the Okzhetpes club later moved to the ZhFC Astana, from where she received a call to the women's national team of Kazakhstan.

Since the beginning of 2017, Aida has played for SSHVSM-Barys.

On 21 February 2018 the Krasnoyarsk Yenisei announced the transfer of Gaistenova. The agreement is for a year. This transfer was the first in the history of women's football in Kazakhstan.

The only girl from Kazakhstan who was included in the TOP-10 rating of the sexiest football players in the world.

On 10 April 2019 it became known that Aida would continue her career in the Russian football club "Zvezda-2005". As part of the team, she made her debut in the first round of the Russian championship against the capital Lokomotiv.

On 20 June 2019 she scored a double in the 1/8 finals of the Russian Cup against Ufa. The meeting ended with a major victory for the Permians with a score of 10:0.

She scored her debut goal for Zvezda-2005 in the Russian championship against the reigning champion Ryazan-VDV and brought her team a victory in the eleventh round. As part of Zvezda-2005 ZhFK, she won the 2019 Russian Cup.

In December 2019, she joined the Common Goal project, which aims to fund football charitable foundations around the world.

Supports the NGO FARE Network, which brings together everyone who is committed to fighting inequality and discrimination in football and uses sport as a tool for social inclusion [source not specified 558 days].

In the 2020 season, her transfer to Zenit was officially announced.

In July 2020, she signed a sponsorship deal with Adidas.

== International goals ==
| No. | Date | Venue | Opponent | Score | Result | Competition |
|---|---|---|---|---|---|---|
| 1. | 21 November 2018 | Theyab Awana Stadium, Dubai, United Arab Emirates | United Arab Emirates | 1–0 | 1–0 | Friendly |
| 2. | 4 June 2024 | Almaty Central Stadium, Almaty, Kazakhstan | Armenia | 2–0 | 4–1 | UEFA Women's Euro 2025 qualifying |
| 3. | 4 June 2024 | Almaty Central Stadium, Almaty, Kazakhstan | Armenia | 3–0 | 4–1 | UEFA Women's Euro 2025 qualifying |

== Achievements ==
- Silver medalist of the championship of Kazakhstan (3);
- Bronze medalist of the championship of Kazakhstan (3);
- Cup Winner Kazakhstan (2);
- Russian Cup Winner: 2019

== Financials ==
Aida is known to be one of the best paid players in the CIS Women's game, but have at several occasions rejected offers that would have made her the absolute best paid player her saying she don't play for money.

== Personal life ==
Gaistenova were the first female players in the Russian Federation and CIS countries to sign up for the Common Goal campaign, created by Juan Mata of Manchester United, wherein players donate 1% of their wages to support soccer-related charities
