= Yekaterina Babshuk =

Kazakhstani footballer (born 1991)

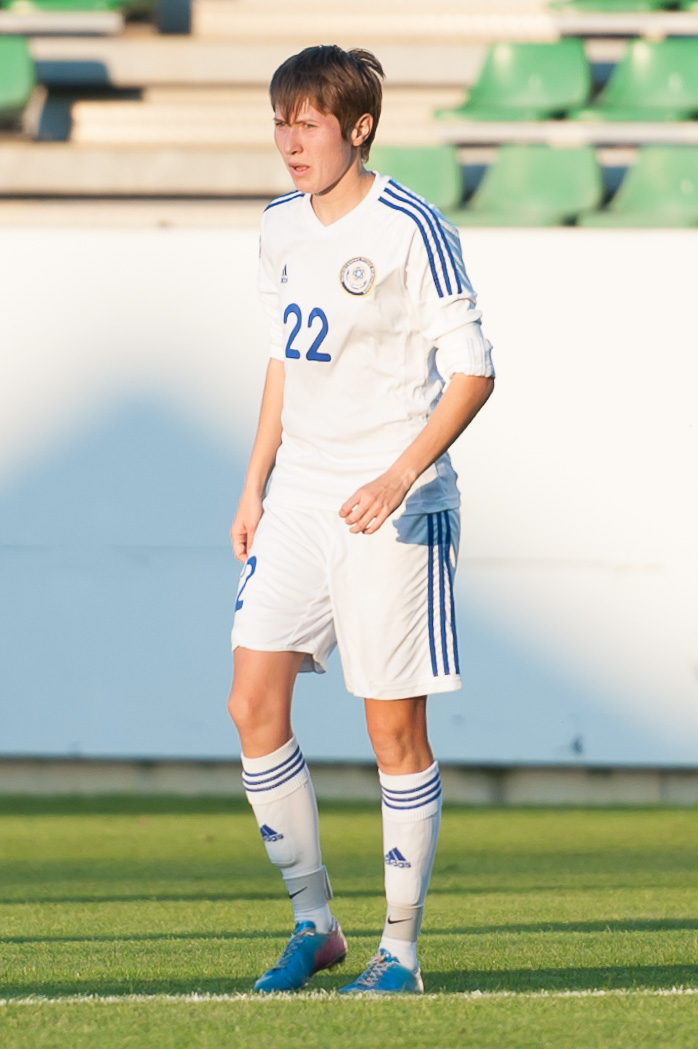
- Babshuk in 2014

Personal information
- Full name: Yekaterina Alexandrovna Babshuk
- Date of birth: 18 September 1991 (age 35)
- Height: 1.72 m (5 ft 7 1/2 in)
- Position: Midfielder

Team information
- Current team: BIIK Kazygurt
- Number: 5

Senior career*
Years	Team	Apps	(Gls)
- BIIK Kazygurt

International career^{‡}
- Kazakhstan
- * Club domestic league appearances and goals as of 19:10, 30 August 2019 (UTC) ‡ National team caps and goals as of 19:10, 30 August 2019 (UTC)

Yekaterina Alexandrovna Babshuk (Russian: Екатерина Александровна Бабшук; born 18 September 1991) is a Kazakhstani footballer who plays as a midfielder and has appeared for the Kazakhstan women's national team.

== Career ==
Babshuk has been capped for the Kazakhstan national team, appearing for the team during the 2019 FIFA Women's World Cup qualifying cycle.
