= Oksana Zheleznyak =

Kazakhstani footballer

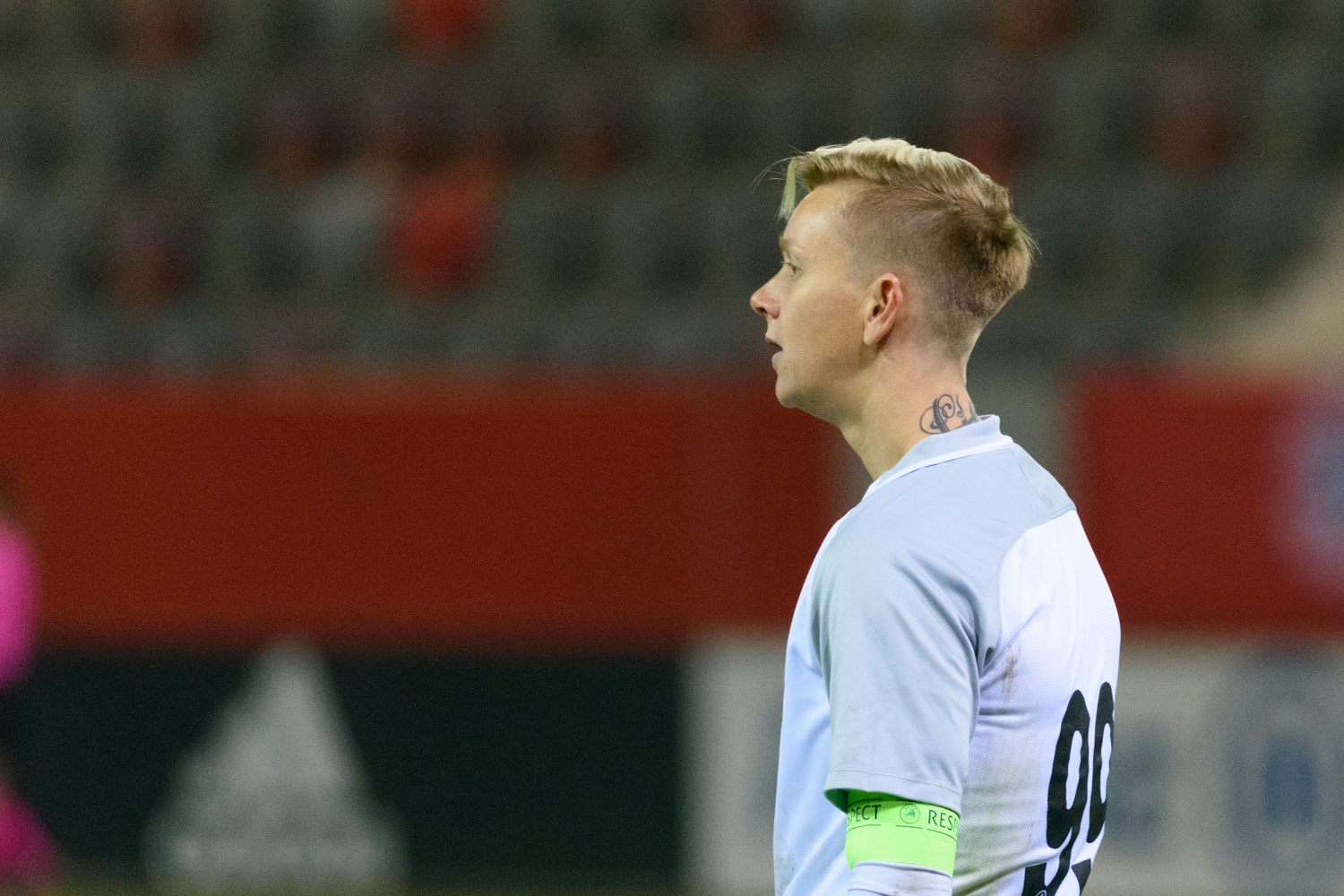

Personal information
- Date of birth: 13 March 1987 (age 39)
- Position: Goalkeeper

Team information
- Current team: Fatih Vatan S.K.
- Number: 1

Senior career*
Years	Team	Apps	(Gls)
- BIIK Kazygurt
2023	Fatih Vatan S.K.	9	(0)

International career^{‡}
- Kazakhstan
- * Club domestic league appearances and goals as of 23 December 2023 ‡ National team caps and goals as of 19:41, 30 August 2019 (UTC)

Oksana Zheleznyak (Russian: Оксана Железняк; born 13 March 1987) is a Kazakhstani football goalkeeper, who lately played in the Turkish Women's Football Super League for Fatih Vatan S.K.

== Career ==
Zheleznyak has been capped for the Kazakhstan national team, appearing for the team during the 2019 FIFA Women's World Cup qualifying cycle.

End August 2023, she moved to Turkey and signed a deal with the Istanbul-based club Fatih Vatan SK. After playing in nine matches of the first half of the 2023–24 Super League, she left the team on 5 January 2024 for Romania.
