= Alina Litvinenko =

Kyrgyzstani footballer

Personal information
- Full name: Alina Sergeyevna Litvinenko
- Date of birth: 17 December 1995 (age 30)
- Place of birth: Bishkek, Kyrgyzstan
- Position: Striker

Senior career*
Years	Team	Apps	(Gls)
2010	Azalea	12	(30)
2012–2023	BIIK Kazygurt	28	(28)
2024-	Aktobe	58	(140)

International career
2009–	Kyrgyzstan	6	(3)
- * Club domestic league appearances and goals

Alina Sergeyevna Litvinenko (Russian: Алина Сергеевна Литвиненко; born 17 December 1995) is a Kyrgyz football striker currently playing for Aktobe in the Kazakhstani Championship. She made her Champions League debut in August 2012, scoring a hat-trick against Pärnu JK.

She is a founding member of the Kyrzygstani national team. On 27 April 2009, in just her second international game, she scored a hat-trick in a 4–1 win against Palestine in the 2010 Asian Cup's qualification. At the age of 13 years, 131 days, she became the youngest goalscorer in international football history.

== Career club ==
Club	Season	Division	League		Cup		Continental		Total	
Club	Season	Division	Apps	Goals	Apps	Goals	Apps	Goals	Apps	Goals
BIIK Shymkent	2012	Kazakhstan women's football championship					5	5	5	5
BIIK Shymkent	2013	Kazakhstan women's football championship								
BIIK Shymkent	2014	Kazakhstan women's football championship	18	23			2	0	20	23
BIIK Shymkent	2015	Kazakhstan women's football championship	6	3	2	1	2	0	10	4
BIIK Shymkent	2016	Kazakhstan women's football championship	4	2	3	2	2	2	9	6
BIIK Shymkent	2017	Kazakhstan women's football championship					4	0	4	0
BIIK Shymkent	2018	Kazakhstan women's football championship					4	0	4	0
BIIK Shymkent	2019	Kazakhstan women's football championship					6	4	6	4
BIIK Shymkent	2023	Kazakhstan women's football championship					2	0	2	0
BIIK Shymkent	Total		28	28	5	3	27	11	60	42
Aktobe	2024	Kazakhstan women's football championship	15	18	4	4			19	22
Aktobe	2025	Kazakhstan women's football championship	23	72			2	1	25	73
Aktobe	2026	Kazakhstan women's football championship	20	50			4	0	24	50
Aktobe	Total		58	140	4	4	6	1	68	145
Total career			86	168	9	7	33	12	128	187

== International goals ==
No.	Date	Venue	Opponent	Score	Result	Competition
1.	27 April 2009	KLFA Stadium, Kuala Lumpur, Malaysia	Palestine	1–0	4–1	2010 AFC Women's Asian Cup qualification
2.	27 April 2009	KLFA Stadium, Kuala Lumpur, Malaysia	Palestine	2–0	4–1	2010 AFC Women's Asian Cup qualification
3.	27 April 2009	KLFA Stadium, Kuala Lumpur, Malaysia	Palestine	4–0	4–1	2010 AFC Women's Asian Cup qualification
