= Kazakhstani Women's Cup =

Әйелдер арасындағы Қазақстан Кубогы
- Founded: 2006
- Region: Kazakhstan
- Teams: 6
- Current champions: BIIK-Kazygurt (8th title)
- Most championships: BIIK-Kazygurt (8 titles)
- 2025 Kazakhstani Women's Cup

The Kazakhstani Women's Cup (Kazakh: Әйелдер арасындағы Қазақстан Кубогы, romanized: Äielder arasyndağy Qazaqstan Kubogy; Russian: Кубка Казахстана, Kubka Kazakhstana) is an annual women's football competition in Kazakhstan.

== Format ==
In earlier seasons, unlike most cup competitions, the Kazakhstani Cup was a round-robin tournament and featured no knock-out system.

The 2014 cup was played over one week in Shymkent. Six teams were drawn into two groups of three. After a single round-robin, the top two teams per group advanced to the semi-finals.

== Previous Cups ==
| Season | Champion | Result | Runner-up |
|---|---|---|---|
| 2007 | BIIK-Kazygurt | group stage | Shakhter-KarGU |
| 2008 | BIIK-Kazygurt | group stage | Zherim |
| 2009 | CSHVSM | group stage | Zherim |
| 2010 | BIIK-Kazygurt | group stage | Zherim KU |
| 2011 | BIIK-Kazygurt | group stage | CSHVSM |
| 2012 | BIIK-Kazygurt | 3–1 | CSHVSM |
| 2013 | BIIK-Kazygurt | 6–0 | Kokshe |
| 2014 | BIIK-Kazygurt | 6–0 | Kokshe |
| 2015 | BIIK-Kazygurt | 6–1 | Kokshe |

== Title by team ==
| Club | Titles |
|---|---|
| BIIK-Kazygurt | 8 |
| CSHVSM | 1 |
