= CSHVSM =

Women's football club based in Kazakhstan

- Full name: CSHVSM Kairat
- Founded: Fall 2007
- League: Kazakhstani women's football championship
- 2012: 1st

CSHVSM-Kairat as used by UEFA or SShVSM-Kairat (Russian: СШВСМ - Специализированная школа высшего спортивного мастерства, meaning roughly Specialized School of Highest Sport Mastership) is a women's football club based in Almaty, Kazakhstan. The club ended the title run of Alma-KTZh in Kazakhstan, with winning the 2009 national championship and cup. The club played under the name SDYuShOR-2 that season. In 2010 they successfully defended their title.

In 2011 the team changed its name to CSHVSM Kairat a tribute to the club FC Kairat, at which the club's director was involved in the 1960s.

== European history ==
The team participated in the 2010–11 UEFA Women's Champions League round of 32, but had no chance facing FCR Duisburg and lost 0–5 and 0–6. They won their first game in the 2011–12 UEFA Women's Champions League.

Competition	Round	Club	Result
2010–11 UEFA Women's Champions League	Round of 32	(Germany) FCR Duisburg	0–5 (H), 0–6 (A)
2011–12 UEFA Women's Champions League	Round of 32	(Austria) SV Neulengbach	2–1 (H), 0–5 (A)
2013–14 UEFA Women's Champions League	Round of 32	(England) Arsenal Ladies	1–7 (H), 1–11 (A)

== Titles ==
- 3 Kazakhstani champions: 2009, 2010, 2012
- Kazakhstani Women's Cup winners: 2009
