= FC Okzhetpes (women) =

Kazakhstani women's football club

FC Okzhetpes (Kazakh: Оқжетпес) is a Kazakhstani women's football club which competes in the top-tier Kazakhstani women's football championship. It is part of the FC Okzhetpes club.

== History ==
The women's football team Žerim was founded in Kokshetau in 2002 and competed in the top-tier league. Renamed Žerim-KU in 2005, it became Kokshe in 2011 after merging with another local club. Financial struggles forced the team to withdraw from the 2016 season. Returning in 2017 as Okžetpes, they finished as national runners-up. In the 2020–21 season, the club made its UEFA Women's Champions League debut.

== Results in Europe ==
Season	Competition	Round	Country	Club	Home	Away	Aggregate
2020–21	UEFA Women's Champions League	1	(Georgia (country))	Lanchkhuti	—	1–2 (a.e.t.)	—
2021–22	UEFA Women's Champions League	Qualifying rounds semi-finals	(England)	Arsenal	—	0–4	—
2021–22	UEFA Women's Champions League	Qualifying rounds third place	(Russia)	Lokomotiv Moscow	—	0–4	—
2023–24	UEFA Women's Champions League	Qualifying rounds semi-finals	(Italy)	Juventus	—	0–6	—
2023–24	UEFA Women's Champions League	Qualifying rounds third place	(Czech Republic)	Slovácko	—	0–3	—
