= Kazakhstani women's football championship =

- Founded: 2004
- Country: Kazakhstan
- Confederation: UEFA
- Number of clubs: 19 (2026)
- Level on pyramid: 1
- Domestic cup: Kazakhstani Women's Cup
- International cup: UEFA Champions League
- Current champions: BIIK Shymkent (2026)
- Most championships: BIIK Shymkent (14 titles)
- Top scorer: Gulnara Gabelia (387 goals)
- Website: kff.kz
- Current: 2026

The Kazakhstani women's football championship is contested in the top level women's football league in Kazakhstan. Before 1991, some Kazakh women's clubs had competed in the Soviet Union women's league system, but after the collapse of the Soviet Union most women's teams left for Russia or simply dissolved.

The number of teams varies from year to year. In 2008 there were 4 teams, 7 in 2009 and 5 in 2015.

The league is played on several matchdays a summer. With now 5 teams, there will be 4 matchdays, actually about a week long, which features a full round robin (so 10 matches, two per day). The winner after the last matchday is the champion and qualifies for a spot in the UEFA Women's Champions League.

== 2024 teams ==
- Aktobe
- BIIK Shymkent
- Okzhetpes
- SDYuSShOR 17
- Turan

== Champions ==
- 2000: Alma-KTZH
- 2001: Alma-KTZh
- 2002: Alma-KTZh
- 2003: Alma-KTZh
- 2004: Alma-KTZh
- 2005: Alma-KTZh
- 2006: Alma-KTZh
- 2007: Alma-KTZh
- 2008: Alma-KTZh
- 2009: CSHVSM
- 2010: CSHVSM
- 2011: BIIK Kazygurt
- 2012: CSHVSM
- 2013: BIIK Kazygurt
- 2014: BIIK Kazygurt
- 2015: BIIK Kazygurt
- 2016: BIIK Kazygurt
- 2017: BIIK Kazygurt
- 2018: BIIK Kazygurt
- 2019: BIIK Kazygurt
- 2020: BIIK Kazygurt
- 2021: BIIK Kazygurt
- 2022: BIIK Kazygurt
- 2023: BIIK Kazygurt
- 2024: BIIK Kazygurt
- 2025: Aktobe
- 2026: BIIK Kazygurt -

Titles	Team
14	BIIK Kazygurt
9	Alma-KTZh
3	CSHVSM
1	Aktobe

- Sdjusshor No. 8 were founded as Sdjusshor No. 2 and were renamed FC SShVSM in 2010; Alma KTZh (Almaty) relocated to Shymkent and were renamed BIIK - Kazygurt after the 2009 season.

== Top scorers ==
Season	Player	Team	Goals
2009	(Kazakhstan) Mariya Yalova	ORMBMZSM	
2013	(Georgia (country)) Gulnara Gabelia	BIIK Shymkent	58
2014	(Georgia (country)) Gulnara Gabelia	BIIK Shymkent	48
2015	(Georgia (country)) Gulnara Gabelia	BIIK Shymkent	30
2016	(Russia) Alina Chukicova	Astana	24
2017	(Georgia (country)) Gulnara Gabelia	BIIK Shymkent	19
2018	(Georgia (country)) Gulnara Gabelia	BIIK Shymkent	
2019	(Kazakhstan) Adylia Vildanova	BIIK Shymkent	26
2020	(Kazakhstan) Begaim Kirgizbaeva	Okzhetpes	
2021	(Georgia (country)) Gulnara Gabelia	BIIK Shymkent	40
2022	(Cameroon) Marie Nga Manga	Okzhetpes	42
2023	(Kazakhstan) Anelia Mamyrova	Tomiris Turan	20
2024	(Georgia (country)) Gulnara Gabelia	BIIK Shymkent	23
2025	(Kyrgyzstan) Alina Litvinenko	Aktobe	72
2026	(Kyrgyzstan) Alina Litvinenko	Aktobe	51

Most time goalscorers

- 7 times
  - Gulnara Gabelia (2013, 2014, 2015, 2017, 2018, 2021 and 2024)

Most goals by a player in a single season

- 72 goals
  - Alina Litvinenko (2025)
