= BIIK Shymkent =

- Full name: BIIK Shymkent
- Founded: 2009; 17 years ago
- Manager: Madiyar Kembilov
- League: Kazakhstan women's football championship
- 2026: Champions
Home colours	Away colours

BIIK Shymkent (Kazakh: БИІК-Қазығұрт, romanized: BİIK-Qazyğūrt) is a women's football club based in Shymkent, Kazakhstan competing in the Kazakhstan Championship. Formerly established in Almaty as Alma-KTZh, the team won five championships in a row between 2004 and 2008 under this name and represented Kazakhstan in the European Cup, making it into the last 16 on four occasions. It was subsequently surpassed by SShVSM Almaty, but following its refoundation it won the 2010 national cup and the 2011 national championship. The team has played some seasons in the UEFA Women's Champions League.

== Honours ==
- Kazakhstan Championship (19)
  - 2004, 2005, 2006, 2007, 2008, 2011, 2013, 2014, 2015, 2016, 2017, 2018, 2019, 2020, 2021, 2022, 2023, 2024, 2026
- Kazakhstan Cup (11)
  - 2007, 2008, 2010, 2011, 2012, 2013, 2014, 2015, 2016, 2017, 2018, 2019, 2020
- Kazakh Super Cup
  - 2013

== UEFA competition record ==
Season	Competition	Stage	Result	Opponent
2004–05	Women's Cup	Qualifying Stage	5–1 (A)	(Bulgaria) Super Sport Sofia
2004–05	Women's Cup	Qualifying Stage	4–0 (A)	(Slovakia) MŠK Žiar nad Hronom
2004–05	Women's Cup	Qualifying Stage	2–1 (A)	(Czech Republic) Slavia Prague
2004–05	Women's Cup	First Stage	0–3 (A)	(Norway) SK Trondheims-Ørn
2004–05	Women's Cup	First Stage	0–2 (A)	(Denmark) Brøndby IF
2004–05	Women's Cup	First Stage	1–4 (A)	(Russia) Energiya Voronezh
2005–06	Women's Cup	Qualifying Stage	5–0 (A)	(Bulgaria) NSA Sofia
2005–06	Women's Cup	Qualifying Stage	3–0 (A)	(Hungary) MTK Hungaria
2005–06	Women's Cup	Qualifying Stage	2–3 (A)	(Greece) AE Aegina
2005–06	Women's Cup	First Stage	5–3 (A)	(Serbia) Mašinac PZP Niš
2005–06	Women's Cup	First Stage	0–3 (A)	(Sweden) Djurgårdens IF
2005–06	Women's Cup	First Stage	0–8 (A)	(Iceland) Valur Reykjavik
2006–07	Women's Cup	Qualifying Stage	2–5 (A)	(Russia) Rossiyanka
2006–07	Women's Cup	Qualifying Stage	5–2 (A)	(Slovakia) Slovan Duslo Šaľa
2006–07	Women's Cup	Qualifying Stage	4–2 (A)	(Romania) CFF Clujana
2007–08	Women's Cup	Qualifying Stage	5–0 (A)	(Moldova) Narta Chișinău
2007–08	Women's Cup	Qualifying Stage	5–0 (A)	(Azerbaijan) Ruslan-93 Baku
2007–08	Women's Cup	Qualifying Stage	3–1 (A)	(Hungary) Femina Budapest
2007–08	Women's Cup	First Stage	0–4 (A)	(England) Arsenal
2007–08	Women's Cup	First Stage	1–5 (A)	(Italy) Bardolino Verona
2007–08	Women's Cup	First Stage	0–3 (A)	(Austria) SV Neulengbach
2008–09	Women's Cup	Qualifying Stage	3–1 (A)	(Croatia) ŽNK Osijek
2008–09	Women's Cup	Qualifying Stage	8–0 (A)	(Northern Ireland) Glentoran Belfast United
2008–09	Women's Cup	Qualifying Stage	3–1 (A)	(Romania) CFF Clujana
2008–09	Women's Cup	First Stage	1–2 (A)	(Italy) Bardolino Verona
2008–09	Women's Cup	First Stage	0–6 (A)	(Sweden) Umeå IK
2008–09	Women's Cup	First Stage	0–8 (A)	(Iceland) Valur Reykjavik
2009–10	Champions League	Round of 32	1–0 (H), 0–2 (A)	(Czech Republic) Sparta Prague
2012–13	Champions League	Qualifying Stage	3–0 (A)	(Estonia) Pärnu JK
2012–13	Champions League	Qualifying Stage	2–0 (A)	(Serbia) Spartak Subotica
2012–13	Champions League	Qualifying Stage	4–0 (A)	(Bulgaria) NSA Sofia
2012–13	Champions League	Round of 32	0–4 (H), 0–4 (A)	(Norway) Røa IL
2014–15	Champions League	Round of 32	2–2 (H), 0–4 (A)	(Germany) FFC Frankfurt
2015–16	Champions League	Round of 32	1–1 (H), 1–4 (A)	(Spain) FC Barcelona
2016–17	Champions League	Qualifying Stage	3–1 (A)	(Republic of Ireland) Wexford Youths
2016–17	Champions League	Qualifying Stage	3–0 (A)	(Moldova) ARF Criuleni
2016–17	Champions League	Qualifying Stage	3–0 (A)	(Lithuania) Gintra Universitetas
2016–17	Champions League	Round of 32	3–1 (H), 1–1 (A)	(Italy) AGSM Verona
2016–17	Champions League	Round of 16	0–3 (H), 1–4 (A)	(France) Paris Saint-Germain
2017–18	Champions League	Qualifying Stage	2–1	(Portugal) Sporting CP
2017–18	Champions League	Qualifying Stage	1–0	(Kosovo) KFF Hajvalia
2017–18	Champions League	Qualifying Stage	3–0	(Hungary) MTK Hungária
2017–18	Champions League	Round of 32	3–0 (H), 1–4 (A)	(Scotland) Glasgow City
2017–18	Champions League	Round of 16	0–7 (H), 0–9 (A)	(France) Lyon
2018–19	Champions League	Qualifying Stage	2–1	(Greece) Elpides Karditsas
2018–19	Champions League	Qualifying Stage	5–0	(Latvia) Rigas FS
2018–19	Champions League	Qualifying Stage	2–0	(Austria) Landhaus Wien
2018–19	Champions League	Round of 32	3–1 (H), 0–3 (A)	(Spain) FC Barcelona
2019–20	Champions League	Qualifying Stage	9–0	(Faroe Islands) EB/Streymur/Skála
2019–20	Champions League	Qualifying Stage	2–0	(Estonia) Flora
2019–20	Champions League	Qualifying Stage	4–1	(Finland) PK-35 Vantaa
2019–20	Champions League	Round of 32	1–1 (A), 2–1 (H)	(Belgium) Anderlecht
2019–20	Champions League	Round of 16	0–5 (H), 0–2 (A)	(Germany) Bayern Munich
2020–21	Champions League	Round of 32	1–2 (A), 1–0 (H)	(Ukraine) Zhytlobud-2 Kharkiv
2020–21	Champions League	Round of 16	1–6 (H), 0–3 (A)	(Germany) Bayern Munich
2021–22	Champions League	Qualifying Stage (Round 1)	4–0	(Slovakia) Slovan Bratislava
2021–22	Champions League	Qualifying Stage (Round 1)	0–1	(Scotland) Glasgow City
2022–23	Champions League	Qualifying Stage (Round 1)	5–1 (A)	(Croatia) Split
2022–23	Champions League	Qualifying Stage (Round 1)	0–2	(Ukraine) Zhytlobud-2 Kharkiv

== Players ==
=== Current squad ===
As of 18 August 2021

Note: Flags indicate national team as defined under FIFA eligibility rules; some limited exceptions apply. Players may hold more than one non-FIFA nationality.

No.	Pos.	Nation	Player
1	GK	KGZ	Angelina Gaier
5	MF	KAZ	Yekaterina Babshuk
6	MF	KAZ	Madina Zhanatayeva
7	FW	GEO	Gulnara Gabelia
9	FW	KGZ	Alina Litvinenko
10	FW	UGA	Fauzia Najjemba
11	DF	KAZ	Mariya Demidova
12	DF	USA	Shannon McCarthy
13	MF	KAZ	Svetlana Bortnikova
15	DF	KAZ	Yekaterina Krasyukova

No.	Pos.	Nation	Player
16	DF	KAZ	Zuleira Abisheva
18	DF	USA	Kennedy Rose
19	DF	USA	Madeleine Kaplan
21	MF	USA	Arden Holden
23	DF	USA	Brooke Denesik
35	GK	KAZ	Madina Shoikina
99	GK	KAZ	Oksana Zheleznyak
—	FW	NGR	Juliet Sunday
—	FW	NGR	Abigail Sunday
