= Kazakhstan women's national football team =

National association football team

Kazakhstan
- Association: Kazakhstan Football Federation
- Confederation: AFC (Asia): 1994–2002; UEFA (Europe): 2002–present
- Head coach: Madiyar Kembilov
- Captain: Begaim Kirgizbaeva
- Most caps: Yuliya Myasnikova (37)
- FIFA code: KAZ
First colours	Second colours

FIFA ranking
- Current: 99 ▲1 (20 October 2026)
- Highest: 58 (March 2009)
- Lowest: 113 (December 2025)

First international
- Kazakhstan 0–0 Hong Kong (Kota Kinabalu, Malaysia; 24 September 1995)

Biggest win
- Hong Kong 0–8 Kazakhstan (Bacolod, Philippines; 7 November 1999); Guam 0–8 Kazakhstan (Philippines; 15 November 1999)

Biggest defeat
- Germany 17–0 Kazakhstan (Wiesbaden, Germany; 19 November 2011)

Asian Cup
- Appearances: 3 (first in 1995)
- Best result: Group stage (1995, 1997, 1999)

The Kazakhstan women's national football team represent Kazakhstan in international women football and it is governed by the Kazakhstan Football Federation.

== Results and fixtures ==
The following is a list of match results in the last 12 months, as well as any future matches that have been scheduled.

Legend

Win Draw Lose Fixture

=== 2026 ===
3 March 2027 FIFA Women's World Cup qualification	Kazakhstan	3–0	Armenia	Astana Arena, Astana
16:00 (20:00 UTC+5)	Burova 35'; Mamyrova 76'; Nurusheva 79'	Report (FIFA); Report (UEFA)		Attendance: 200; Referee: Lorraine Watson (Scotland)

7 March 2027 FIFA Women's World Cup qualification	Kazakhstan	0–1	Belarus	Astana Arena, Astana
10:00 (14:00 UTC+5)		Report (FIFA); Report (UEFA)	Siniauskaya 71'	Attendance: 200; Referee: Tjaša Misja (Slovenia)

18 April 2027 FIFA Women's World Cup qualification	Belarus	0–1	Kazakhstan	Tengiz Burjanadze Stadium, Gori (Georgia) (Note: Due to Belarusian involvement in the Russian invasion of Ukraine, Belarus are required to play their home matches at neutral venues, and behind closed doors, until further notice.)
14:00 (16:00 UTC+4)		Report (FIFA); Report (UEFA)	Norbayeva 84'	Attendance: 0 Referee: Andromachi Tsiofliki (Greece)

5 June 2027 FIFA Women's World Cup qualification	Armenia	1–1	Kazakhstan	Yerevan Football Academy Stadium, Yerevan
16:00 (18:00 UTC+4)	Karagezian 35'	Report (FIFA); Report (UEFA)	Bibossynova 70'	Attendance: 200; Referee: Marta San Juan (Andorra)

9 October 2027 FIFA Women's World Cup Qualifiers	Kazakhstan	0–8	Republic of Ireland	Astana, Kazakhstan
16:00 UTC+5		Report	Carusa 7', 28'; Mustaki 16'; Murphy 44'; Larkin 45+3'; Finn 58'; Hopcroft 73'; Stapleton 90'	Stadium: Astana Arena; Referee: Karoline Marie Jensen (Norway)

13 October 2027 FIFA Women's World Cup Qualifiers	Republic of Ireland	4–0 (12–0 agg.)	Kazakhstan	Cork, Ireland
19:30 IST	Stapleton 40'; McCabe 48'; Quinn 70'; O'Sullivan 73'	Report		Stadium: Páirc Uí Chaoimh; Referee: Michaela Pachtová (Czech Republic)

== Coaching staff ==
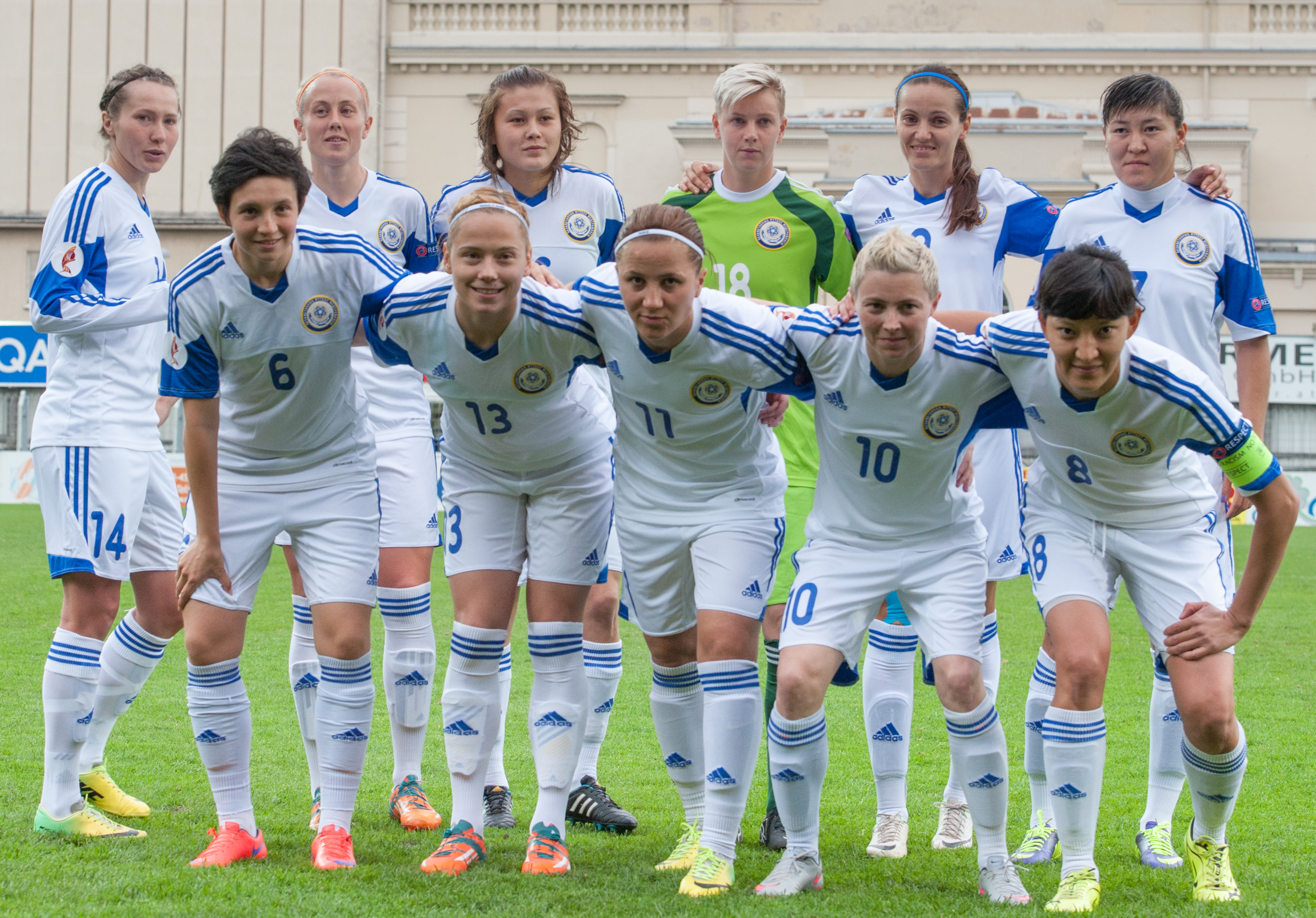
The women's national football team of Kazakhstan in 2016

=== Current coaching staff ===
Updated as 15 October 2025

Position	Name	Ref.
Head coach	(Kazakhstan) Madiyar Kembilov	
Assistant coach	(Kazakhstan) Begaim Kirgizbaeva	
Goalkeeping coach	(Kazakhstan) Murat Mukashev	
Physical coach	(Kazakhstan) Zhenis Arystan	
Analyst	(Kazakhstan) Timur Kasymov	
Doctor	(Kazakhstan) Aidana Ramazanova	
Massage therapist	(Kazakhstan) Rahat Naurzaliyev	
Massage therapist	(Kazakhstan) Maksim Dudukin	
Administrator	(Kazakhstan) Natalia Gorenko	
Kit manager	(Kazakhstan) Edilet Dosymzhanov	
Video operator	(Kazakhstan) Maksat Emirbay	

=== Manager history ===
- (Kazakhstan) Raziya Nurkenova
- (Bulgaria) Kaloyan Petkov (???-???)
- (Kazakhstan) Madiyar Kembilov (2023–present)

== Players ==
=== Current squad ===
The following players were named to the squad for the October 2025 training camp and friendly matches against Azerbaijan on 24 and 27 October 2025 in Shymkent.

Caps and goals correct as of 8 April 2025, after the match against Armenia.

No.	Pos.	Player	Date of birth (age)	Caps	Goals	Club
	GK	Aruzhan Orazbekova	29 March 2006 (age 20)		0	(Football Federation of Macedonia) Lyubotin
	GK	Nazym Ismailova	24 February 2001 (age 25)	5	0	(Kazakhstan Football Federation) FC Tomiris-Turan
	GK	Assel Anuarbek	29 March 2006 (age 20)		0	(Kazakhstan Football Federation) Ulytau
	DF	Aleksandra Burova	22 August 2002 (age 24)	26	1	(Kazakhstan Football Federation) BIIK Shymkent
	DF	Kazyna Norbayeva	13 May 2005 (age 21)	7	0	(Kazakhstan Football Federation) FC Aktobe
	DF	Madina Zhanataeva	3 May 1991 (age 35)	20	0	(Kazakhstan Football Federation) FC Aktobe
	DF	Mariya Demidova	28 August 1996 (age 30)	31	0	(Football Federation of Belarus) FC Minsk
	DF	Yuliya Myasnikova	13 June 1993 (age 33)	32	5	(Russian Football Union) CSKA Moscow
	DF	Karina Botabek				(Kazakhstan Football Federation) Ulytau
	DF	Nazereke Shalmukhambetova				(Kazakhstan Football Federation) Kyzyl-Zhar
	DF	Kristina Shustova				(Kazakhstan Football Federation) Zhenis
	DF	Adeliya Bekkozhina				(Kazakhstan Football Federation) Zhenis
	MF	Karina Zhumabaikyzy	4 August 1996 (age 30)	34	0	(Kazakhstan Football Federation) FC Aktobe
	MF	Anastasiya Nizamutdinova	5 July 2000 (age 26)			(Russian Football Union) Yenisey
	MF	Karina Berikova	21 July 2004 (age 22)	9	1	(Football Association of Montenegro) ŽFK Budućnost Podgorica
	MF	Kseniya Khairulina	29 January 1997 (age 29)	25	0	(Kazakhstan Football Federation) BIIK Shymkent
	MF	Elmira Abdullayeva				(Kazakhstan Football Federation) Kairat
	FW	Aida Gaystenova	21 May 1994 (age 32)	28	3	(Kazakhstan Football Federation) FC Aktobe
	FW	Assem Karazhanova	8 October 1997 (age 29)	16	0	(Kazakhstan Football Federation) FC Aktobe
	FW	Asselkhan Turlybekova	18 December 1998 (age 27)	39	3	(Kazakhstan Football Federation) BIIK Shymkent
	FW	Amina Bibosynova	5 December 2005 (age 20)	8	3	(German Football Association) FFC Turbine Potsdam
	FW	Assel Kubesova				(Kazakhstan Football Federation) Kyzyl-Zhar
	FW	Araylym Orynbasarova				(Kazakhstan Football Federation) Kyzyl-Zhar
	FW	Anelya Mamyrova	25 July 2006 (age 20)			(Kazakhstan Football Federation) Elimai

=== Recent call ups ===
These players have been called up a squad within the last 12 months.

Pos.	Player	Date of birth (age)	Caps	Goals	Club	Latest call-up

== Main Results ==
As of 24 March 2022

Tournament	Pld	W	D	L	GF	GA	Dif
FIFA World Cup Qualification	40	5	3	32	23	118	−95
UEFA European Championship Qualification	35	5	4	26	15	146	−131
AFC Asian Cup	9	2	2	5	16	39	−23
Total	84	12	9	63	54	303	-249

== Competitive record ==
=== FIFA Women's World Cup ===
FIFA Women's World Cup record									Qualification record						
Year	Result	GP	W	D*	L	GF	GA	GD	GP	W	D*	L	GF	GA	GD
(China) 1991 to (Sweden) 1995	Did not exist								Did not exist						
(United States) 1999	Did not qualify								1997 AFC Championship						
(United States) 2003	Did not enter								Did not enter						
(China) 2007	Did not qualify								6	1	1	4	3	12	−9
(Germany) 2011	Did not qualify								8	0	0	8	4	32	−28
(Canada) 2015	Did not qualify								10	1	1	8	8	30	−22
(France) 2019	Did not qualify								11	3	1	7	6	23	−17
(Australia) (New Zealand) 2023	Did not qualify								5	0	0	5	2	21	−19
(Brazil) 2027	Did not qualify								6	2	1	3	5	14	−9
(Costa Rica) (Jamaica) (Mexico) (United States) 2031	To be determined								To be determined						
(United Kingdom) 2035	To be determined								To be determined						
Total	-	-	-	-	-	-	-	-	46	7	4	35	28	132	−104

*Draws include knockout matches decided on penalty kicks.

=== Olympic Games ===
Summer Olympics record
Year	Result	GP	W	D	L	GF	GA
(United States) 1996	Did not exist						
(Australia) 2000	Did not qualify						
(Greece) 2004	Did not enter						
(China) 2008	Did not qualify						
(United Kingdom) 2012	Did not qualify						
(Brazil) 2016	Did not qualify						
(Japan) 2020	Did not qualify						
(France) 2024	Unable to qualify						
(United States) 2028	To be determined						
(Australia) 2032	To be determined						
Total	-	-	-	-	-	-	-

*Draws include knockout matches decided on penalty kicks.

=== UEFA Women's Championship ===
UEFA Women's Championship record								Qualifying record							
Year	Result	Pld	W	D*	L	GS	GA	Pld	W	D*	L	GS	GA	P/R	Rnk
1984 to 1995	Did not exist							Did not exist							
(Norway) (Sweden) 1997 to (Germany) 2001	Not a member of UEFA							Not a member of UEFA							
(England) 2005	Did not qualify							6	0	2	4	4	16	–	
(Finland) 2009	Did not qualify							3	2	0	1	3	2	–	
(Sweden) 2013	Did not qualify							10	2	1	7	4	55	–	
(Netherlands) 2017	Did not qualify							8	1	1	6	2	30	–	
(England) 2022	Did not qualify							8	0	0	8	2	43	–	
(Switzerland) 2025	Did not qualify							6	1	1	4	5	8	(Note: From Euro 2025 onwards a new qualifying format was introduced, linked to the Women's Nations League where teams are divided into leagues with promotion/relegation between the leagues at the end of each cycle.)	48th
Total	0/6	-	-	-	-	-	-	41	6	5	30	20	154	48th	

*Draws include knockout matches decided on penalty kicks.

=== UEFA Women's Nations League ===
UEFA Women's Nations League record
Year	Division	Group	Pos	Pld	W	D	L	GF	GA	P/R	Rnk
2023–24	C	4	3rd	6	2	2	2	6	5	Same position	44th
2025	C	3	2nd	6	3	1	2	14	9	Same position	43rd
Total				12	5	3	4	20	14	44th	

▲	Promoted at end of season
Same position	No movement at end of season
▼	Relegated at end of season
*	Participated in promotion/relegation play-offs

=== AFC Women's Asian Cup ===
AFC Women's Asian Cup record
Year	Result	GP	W	D*	L	GF	GA	GD
(Hong Kong) 1975 to (Malaysia) 1993	Did not exist							
(Malaysia) 1995	Group stage	3	0	2	1	0	7	−7
(China) 1997	Group stage	2	0	0	2	0	17	−17
(Philippines) 1999	Group stage	4	2	0	2	16	15	+1
(Chinese Taipei) 2001	Did not enter							
(Thailand) 2003 to present	Not a member of AFC							
Total	3/4	9	2	2	5	16	39	−23

*Draws include knockout matches decided on penalty kicks.

== Head-to-head record ==
The following table shows Kazakhstan women's all-time international record, correct as of 17 Nov 2020.

Against	Played	Won	Drawn	Lost	GF	GA
Total	88	14	11	62	62	268

Source: Worldfootball

== See also ==
- Sport in Kazakhstan
  - Football in Kazakhstan
    - Women's football in Kazakhstan
- Kazakhstan national football team
- Women's association football
