= Football at the 2025 SEA Games – Women's team squads =

List of footballers

The women's football tournament at the 2025 SEA Games was held from 4 to 17 December 2025. The women's tournament is a full international tournament with no restrictions on age. The eight national teams involved in the tournament were required to register a squad of 23 players, including two goalkeepers. Only players in these squads were eligible to take part in the tournament.

The position listed for each player is per the official squad lists published by any federation. The age listed for each player is on 4 December 2025, the first day of the tournament. The numbers of caps and goals listed for each player do not include any matches played after the start of the tournament. The club listed is the club for which the player last played a competitive match prior to the tournament. The nationality for each club reflects the national association (not the league) to which the club is affiliated. A flag is included for coaches who are of a different nationality than their own national team.

== Group A ==
=== Thailand ===
Head coach: Nuengrutai Srathongvian

Thailand announced their final squad on 2 December 2025.

No.	Pos.	Player	Date of birth (age)	Caps	Goals	Club
1	GK	Panita Promrat	20 September 1998 (aged 27)			(Football Association of Thailand) BGC–College of Asian Scholars
18	GK	Thichanan Sodchuen	1 February 2003 (aged 22)			(Football Association of Thailand) BGC–College of Asian Scholars
22	GK	Chotmanee Thongmongkol	12 January 1999 (aged 26)			(Chinese Taipei Football Association) Taichung Blue Whale
2	DF	Uraiporn Yongkul	17 August 1998 (aged 27)			(Football Association of Thailand) BGC–College of Asian Scholars
3	DF	Supaporn Inthraprasit	{{{age}}}			(Football Association of Thailand) Chonburi
4	DF	Kanjanaporn Saenkhun	18 July 1996 (aged 29)			(Football Association of Thailand) BGC–College of Asian Scholars
5	DF	Panitha Jiratanaphibun	27 June 2004 (aged 21)			(Chinese Football Association) Guangxi Pingguo
13	MF	Sunisa Srangthaisong	6 May 1988 (aged 37)			(Football Association of Singapore) Aerion WFC
6	MF	Pikul Khueanpet	20 September 1988 (aged 37)			(Football Association of Thailand) BGC–College of Asian Scholars
7	MF	Silawan Intamee	22 January 1994 (aged 31)			(Chinese Taipei Football Association) Taichung Blue Whale
8	MF	Pluemjai Sontisawat	20 July 2003 (aged 22)			(Football Association of Thailand) Chonburi
11	MF	Chatchawan Rodthong	22 June 2002 (aged 23)			(Football Association of Thailand) Bangkok
12	MF	Nutwadee Pramnak	9 October 2000 (aged 25)			(Football Association of Thailand) BGC–College of Asian Scholars
15	MF	Orapin Waenngoen	7 October 1995 (aged 30)			(Football Association of Thailand) BGC–College of Asian Scholars
19	MF	Pitsamai Sornsai (captain)	19 January 1989 (aged 36)			(Chinese Taipei Football Association) Taichung Blue Whale
20	MF	Rhianne Rush	9 January 2003 (aged 22)			(The Football Association) Real Bedford
9	FW	Jiraporn Mongkoldee	13 August 1998 (aged 27)			(Chinese Football Association) Guangxi Pingguo
10	FW	Kanyanat Chetthabutr	24 September 1999 (aged 26)			(Football Association of Thailand) BGC–College of Asian Scholars
14	FW	Saowalak Pengngam	30 November 1996 (aged 29)			(Chinese Taipei Football Association) Taichung Blue Whale
16	FW	Madison Casteen	24 October 2007 (aged 18)			(United States Soccer Federation) NC Courage Academy
17	FW	Taneekarn Dangda	15 December 1992 (aged 32)	71	26	(Football Association of Thailand) BGC–College of Asian Scholars
21	FW	Pattaranan Aupachai	9 July 2002 (aged 23)			(Football Association of Thailand) Chonburi
23	FW	Natalie Olson	18 July 2002 (aged 23)			(New Zealand Football) Wellington United

=== Singapore ===
Head coach: (Morocco) Karim Bencherifa

Singapore announced their final squad on 25 November 2025.

No.	Pos.	Player	Date of birth (age)	Caps	Goals	Club
1	GK	Izairida Shakira	2 June 2007 (aged 18)	5	0	(Football Association of Singapore) Lion City Sailors
23	GK	Elizabeth Tan Yip Zheng	6 February 2002 (aged 23)	0	0	(Football Association of Singapore) Tanjong Pagar United
13	GK	Lamasan Chantale	11 January 2009 (aged 16)	0	0	(United States Soccer Federation) IMG Academy
18	DF	Siti Rosnani Binte Azman	22 May 1997 (aged 28)	51	1	(Football Association of Singapore) Albirex Niigata (S)
2	DF	Syazwani Ruzi	20 December 2001 (aged 23)	39	1	(Football Association of Singapore) Lion City Sailors
4	DF	Umairah Hamdan	11 March 2002 (aged 23)	28	0	(Football Association of Singapore) Lion City Sailors
6	DF	Nurhidayu Binte Naszri	16 March 2004 (aged 21)	21	0	(Football Association of Singapore) Lion City Sailors
19	DF	Angelyn Pang	13 April 1991 (aged 34)	21	0	(Football Association of Singapore) Hougang United
14	DF	Yasmine Binte Zaharin	19 March 2008 (aged 17)	8	0	(United States Soccer Federation) IMG Academy
5	DF	Irsalina Binte Irwan	1 January 2007 (aged 18)	7	0	(Football Association of Singapore) Lion City Sailors
3	DF	Seri Nurinsyirah	29 January 2009 (aged 16)	0	0	(United States Soccer Federation) IMG Academy
21	DF	Nurul Unaisah	12 July 2003 (aged 22)	1	0	(Football Association of Singapore) Still Aerion
22	MF	Farhanah Binte Ruhaizat	26 July 1998 (aged 27)	46	2	(Football Association of Singapore) Geylang International
7	MF	Lim Li Xian	24 November 1996 (aged 29)	35	2	(Football Association of Singapore) Tiong Bahru
8	MF	Sitianiwati Rosielin	26 May 1997 (aged 28)	32		(Football Association of Singapore) Hougang United
17	MF	Dhaniyah Qasimah	7 July 2004 (aged 21)	34	0	(Football Association of Singapore) Lion City Sailors
20	MF	Dorcas Chu	29 July 2002 (aged 23)	21	3	(Football Association of Singapore) Lion City Sailors
16	MF	Sarah Zu’risqha Zul’kepli	24 July 2006 (aged 19)	8	0	(Football Association of Singapore) Lion City Sailors
15	MF	Sharifah Nur Amanina	8 January 2008 (aged 17)	1	0	(Football Association of Singapore) Balestier Khalsa
12	FW	Raudhah Kamis	4 March 1999 (aged 26)	29	5	(Football Association of Singapore) Hougang United
9	FW	Danelle Tan	25 October 2004 (aged 21)	23	7	(Japan Football Association) Nippon TV Tokyo Verdy Beleza
10	FW	Cara Ming-Yan Chang	28 November 2008 (aged 17)	11	1	(The Football Association) Ardingly College
11	FW	Chloe Koh Ke Ying	18 February 2007 (aged 18)	10	0	(Football Association of Singapore) Geylang International

=== Indonesia ===
Head coach: (Japan) Akira Higashiyama

Indonesia announced their final squad on 2 December 2025.

No.	Pos.	Player	Date of birth (age)	Caps	Goals	Club
1	GK	Iris de Rouw	21 April 2005 (age 21)	4	0	(United States Soccer Federation) St. John's Red Storm
23	GK	Alleana Ayu Arumy	26 February 2010 (age 16)	1	0	(Football Association of Indonesia) Asprov DKI Jakarta
21	GK	Shesilia Desrina	7 December 2007 (age 18)	0	0	(Football Association of Indonesia) Persib Bandung
13	DF	Safira Ika	21 April 2003 (aged 22)	43	1	(Football Association of Indonesia) Asprov DKI Jakarta
17	DF	Vivi Oktavia (captain)	7 March 1997 (aged 28)	36	2	(Football Association of Indonesia) Asprov Bangka Belitung
12	DF	Zahra Muzdalifah	4 April 2001 (aged 24)	33	4	(Football Association of Indonesia) Asprov DKI Jakarta
2	DF	Remini Rumbewas	9 October 2000 (aged 25)	17	1	(Football Association of Indonesia) Toli
5	DF	Gea Yumanda	27 June 2006 (aged 19)	15	1	(Football Association of Indonesia) Asprov Jabar
4	DF	Emily Nahon	17 May 2007 (aged 18)	5	0	(United States Soccer Federation) Little Rock Trojans
3	DF	Jazlyn Kayla	26 August 2010 (aged 15)	0	0	(Football Association of Indonesia) Asprov DKI Jakarta
15	MF	Helsya Maeisyaroh	7 May 2005 (aged 20)	29	2	(Football Association of Indonesia) Asprov Jabar
19	MF	Viny Silfianus	3 July 2002 (aged 23)	23	0	(Football Association of Malaysia) Kelana United
16	MF	Rosdilah Nurrohmah	3 October 1999 (aged 26)	18	1	(Football Association of Indonesia) Raga Negeri
8	MF	Reva Octaviani	8 October 2003 (aged 22)	23	5	(Football Association of Indonesia) Asprov Jabar
7	MF	Felicia de Zeeuw	19 January 2006 (aged 19)	4	0	(Royal Dutch Football Association) ADO Den Haag
6	MF	Nafeeza Nori	11 March 2011 (aged 14)	0	0	(Football Association of Indonesia) Asprov Jabar
9	FW	Claudia Scheunemann	24 April 2009 (aged 16)	19	6	(Royal Dutch Football Association) Utrecht
14	FW	Isa Warps	6 March 2005 (aged 20)	7	1	(German Football Association) VfR Warbeyen
18	FW	Marsela Awi	10 May 2003 (aged 22)	24	4	(Football Association of Indonesia) Toli
10	FW	Sheva Imut	20 April 2004 (aged 21)	23	2	(Football Association of Indonesia) Asprov DKI Jakarta
20	FW	Ajeng Sri Handayani	13 December 2006 (aged 18)	2	0	(Football Association of Indonesia) Persib Bandung
22	FW	Aulia Mabruroh	25 January 2005 (aged 20)	3	1	(Football Association of Indonesia) Asprov Lampung
11	FW	Ayunda Dwi Anggraini	15 January 2006 (aged 19)	1	0	(Football Association of Indonesia) Asprov Jatim

== Group B ==
=== Vietnam ===
Vietnam announced their final squad on 1 December 2025.

Head coach: Mai Đức Chung

No.	Pos.	Player	Date of birth (age)	Caps	Goals	Club
14	GK	Trần Thị Kim Thanh	18 September 1993 (aged 32)	61	0	(Vietnam Football Federation) Ho Chi Minh City
20	GK	Khổng Thị Hằng	10 October 1993 (aged 32)	34	0	(Vietnam Football Federation) Than KSVN
1	GK	Quách Thu Em	15 August 1995 (aged 30)	0	0	(Vietnam Football Federation) Ho Chi Minh City
5	DF	Hoàng Thị Loan	6 February 1995 (aged 30)	49	3	(Vietnam Football Federation) Hanoi
6	DF	Nguyễn Thị Hoa	28 November 2000 (aged 25)	4	0	(Vietnam Football Federation) Hanoi
10	DF	Trần Thị Hải Linh	8 June 2001 (aged 24)	31	1	(Vietnam Football Federation) Hanoi
13	DF	Lê Thị Diễm My	6 March 1994 (aged 31)	30	0	(Vietnam Football Federation) Than KSVN
2	DF	Lương Thị Thu Thương	1 May 2000 (aged 25)	39	0	(Vietnam Football Federation) Than KSVN
22	DF	Nguyễn Thị Mỹ Anh	27 November 1994 (aged 31)	34	1	(Vietnam Football Federation) Thai Nguyen T&T
4	DF	Trần Thị Thu	15 January 1991 (aged 34)	46	2	(Vietnam Football Federation) Thai Nguyen T&T
15	DF	Trần Thị Duyên	28 December 2000 (aged 24)	14	1	(Vietnam Football Federation) Phong Phu Ha Nam
18	DF	Cù Thị Huỳnh Như	7 August 2000 (aged 25)	5	0	(Vietnam Football Federation) Ho Chi Minh City
17	DF	Trần Thị Thu Thảo	15 January 1993 (aged 32)	57	5	(Vietnam Football Federation) Ho Chi Minh City
3	DF	Nguyễn Thị Kim Yên	26 June 2002 (aged 23)	2	0	(Vietnam Football Federation) Ho Chi Minh City
21	MF	Ngân Thị Vạn Sự	29 April 2001 (aged 24)	43	11	(Vietnam Football Federation) Hanoi
19	MF	Nguyễn Thị Thanh Nhã	25 September 2001 (aged 24)	39	7	(Vietnam Football Federation) Hanoi
11	MF	Thái Thị Thảo	12 February 1995 (aged 30)	58	15	(Vietnam Football Federation) Hanoi
8	MF	Nguyễn Thị Trúc Hương	4 March 2000 (aged 25)	11	1	(Vietnam Football Federation) Than KSVN
23	MF	Nguyễn Thị Bích Thùy	1 May 1994 (aged 31)	81	20	(Vietnam Football Federation) Thai Nguyen T&T
12	FW	Phạm Hải Yến	9 November 1994 (aged 31)	92	54	(Vietnam Football Federation) Hanoi
16	FW	Nguyễn Thị Thúy Hằng	19 November 1997 (aged 28)	20	6	(Vietnam Football Federation) Than KSVN
7	FW	Ngọc Minh Chuyên	23 June 2004 (aged 21)	3	1	(Vietnam Football Federation) Thai Nguyen T&T
9	FW	Huỳnh Như	28 November 1991 (aged 34)	116	69	(Vietnam Football Federation) Ho Chi Minh City

=== Myanmar ===
Myanmar announced their 26-women preliminary squad on 19 November 2025. The final squad was announced on 1 December 2025.

Head coach: (Japan) Tetsuro Uki

No.	Pos.	Player	Date of birth (age)	Caps	Goals	Club
1	GK	Ei Sandar Zaw	15 February 2000 (aged 25)	2	0	(Myanmar Football Federation) Ayeyawady
22	GK	Myo Mya Mya Nyein	28 November 1999 (aged 26)	23	0	(Myanmar Football Federation) Thitsar Arman W.F.C.
18	GK	Zu Latt Nadi	22 December 2000 (aged 24)	1	0	(Myanmar Football Federation) ISPE W.F.C.
2	DF	May Thet Mon Myint	28 November 2004 (aged 21)	18	1	(Myanmar Football Federation) Thitsar Arman W.F.C.
3	DF	Nan Phyu Phwe	9 May 2005 (aged 20)	7	0	(Myanmar Football Federation) Yangon United
4	DF	Zune Yu Ya Oo	12 February 2001 (aged 24)	27	0	(Myanmar Football Federation) Ayeyawady
5	DF	Phyu Phyu Win	12 January 2004 (aged 21)	27	0	(Myanmar Football Federation) Ayeyawady
14	DF	Lin Lae Oo	6 September 2002 (aged 23)	13	0	(Myanmar Football Federation) ISPE W.F.C.
15	DF	Hnin Pwint Aye	26 January 2004 (aged 21)	6	0	(Myanmar Football Federation) ISPE W.F.C.
16	DF	Yu Yu Naing	29 November 2007 (aged 18)	9	1	(Myanmar Football Federation) Yangon United
17	DF	Than Than Nwe	5 January 2003 (aged 22)	6	0	(Myanmar Football Federation) ISPE W.F.C.
6	MF	Naw Htet Htet Wai	30 July 2000 (aged 25)	31	0	(Myanmar Football Federation) Ayeyawady
9	MF	Khin Mo Mo Tun	3 July 1999 (aged 26)	40	5	(Myanmar Football Federation) Thitsar Arman W.F.C.
11	MF	Yu Per Khine	31 January 1996 (aged 29)	35	4	(Myanmar Football Federation) Shan United
12	MF	Win Win	12 February 2003 (aged 22)	12	8	(Myanmar Football Federation) Thitsar Arman W.F.C.
19	MF	Shwe Yee Tun	14 May 2003 (aged 22)	11	6	(Myanmar Football Federation) ISPE W.F.C.
10	MF	Khin Marlar Tun	21 September 1989 (aged 36)	127	33	(Myanmar Football Federation) ISPE W.F.C.
21	MF	Yoon Wadi Hlaing	9 September 2005 (aged 20)	13	2	(Myanmar Football Federation) Yangon United
23	MF	Lin Myint Mo	9 June 2002 (aged 23)	36	5	(Myanmar Football Federation) ISPE W.F.C.
7	FW	Win Theingi Tun	1 February 1995 (aged 30)	88	84	(Football Association of Malaysia) Sabah FA
8	FW	San Thaw Thaw	2 January 2001 (aged 24)	47	18	(Myanmar Football Federation) Ayeyawady
13	FW	Myat Noe Khin	24 July 2003 (aged 22)	22	8	(Myanmar Football Federation) Thitsar Arman W.F.C.
20	FW	May Htet Lu	29 January 2003 (aged 22)	7	5	(United States Soccer Federation) SFVFC

=== Philippines ===
Philippines announced their final squad on 4 December 2025.

Head coach: (Australia) Mark Torcaso

No.	Pos.	Player	Date of birth (age)	Caps	Goals	Club
1	GK	Olivia McDaniel	October 14, 1997 (aged 28)	54	0	(Philippine Football Federation) Stallion Laguna
18	GK	Inna Palacios	February 8, 1994 (aged 31)	52	0	(Philippine Football Federation) Kaya–Iloilo
22	GK	Nina Meollo	June 23, 2004 (aged 21)	1	0	(The Football Association) Real Bedford
2	DF	Malea Cesar	December 9, 2003 (aged 21)	32	1	(United States Soccer Federation) Trinity Tigers
3	DF	Jessika Cowart	October 30, 1999 (aged 26)	40	2	(Canadian Soccer Association) Vancouver Rise
4	DF	Azumi Oka	April 21, 2006 (aged 19)	2	0	(United States Soccer Federation) UNC Greensboro Spartans
5	DF	Hali Long (captain)	January 21, 1995 (aged 30)	96	22	(Football Association of Thailand) College of Asian Scholars
9	DF	Ariana Markey	June 8, 2007 (aged 18)	0	0	(United States Soccer Federation) Pepperdine Waves
13	DF	Angela Beard	August 16, 1997 (aged 28)	20	1	(Swedish Football Association) AIK
16	DF	Sofia Harrison Wunsch	February 16, 1999 (aged 26)	54	3	Free agent
20	DF	Janae DeFazio	September 6, 2001 (aged 24)	9	0	(Football Australia) Western Sydney Wanderers
6	MF	Jaclyn Sawicki	November 14, 1992 (aged 33)	39	1	(Canadian Soccer Association) Calgary Wild
8	MF	Sara Eggesvik	April 29, 1997 (aged 28)	45	6	(Norwegian Football Federation) LSK Kvinner
12	MF	Kaya Hawkinson	April 17, 2000 (aged 25)	23	1	(Philippine Football Federation) Stallion Laguna
15	MF	Isabella Pasion	July 14, 2006 (aged 19)	17	0	(Philippine Football Federation) Stallion Laguna
19	MF	Alessandrea Carpio	March 4, 2002 (aged 23)	5	0	(Philippine Football Federation) Kaya–Iloilo
23	MF	Alexa Pino	March 1, 2007 (aged 18)	5	2	(United States Soccer Federation) Kentucky Wildcats
7	FW	Jael-Marie Guy	August 15, 2007 (aged 18)	0	0	(United States Soccer Federation) Brown Bears
10	FW	Megan Murray	November 23, 2005 (aged 20)	1	0	(United States Soccer Federation) Marquette Golden Eagles
11	FW	Anicka Castañeda	December 16, 1999 (aged 25)	41	11	(Philippine Football Federation) Kaya–Iloilo
14	FW	Meryll Serrano	July 20, 1997 (aged 28)	26	9	(Norwegian Football Federation) Haugesund
17	FW	Nina Mathelus	September 12, 2008 (aged 17)	8	1	(United States Soccer Federation) Thayer Academy
21	FW	Mallie Ramirez	September 1, 2004 (aged 21)	0	0	(United States Soccer Federation) UNLV Rebels

=== Malaysia ===
The following players were finalised for the 2025 SEA Games in Chonburi, Thailand.

Head coach: (Brazil) Joel Cornelli

No.	Pos.	Player	Date of birth (age)	Caps	Goals	Club
23	GK	Nurul Azurin Mazlan	27 January 2000 (aged 25)	50	0	(Football Association of Malaysia) Sabah
1	GK	Nur Ezza Ashikin Abdul Razak	18 April 2003 (aged 22)	6	0	(Football Association of Malaysia) Selangor
18	DF	Nur Amirah Abdul Rahman	21 November 2004 (aged 21)	10	0	(Football Association of Malaysia) Selangor
3	DF	Eusvewana Kadius	25 May 2005 (aged 20)	14	0	(Football Association of Malaysia) Selangor
2	DF	Juliana Barek	4 January 2002 (aged 23)	15	1	(Football Association of Malaysia) Sabah
5	DF	Siti Nurfaizah Saidin	1 April 2002 (aged 23)	24	0	(Football Association of Malaysia) Sabah
4	DF	Nur Dhiyaa Addin Mohd Azhari	12 March 2006 (aged 19)	1	0	(Football Association of Malaysia) MBSJ
10	DF	Steffi Sarge Kaur (captain)	25 October 1988 (aged 37)	35	4	(Football Association of Malaysia) MBSJ
12	DF	Kanchenjeet Kaur Nanua	5 July 2006 (aged 19)	4	0	(United States Soccer Federation) Miami Dade College
16	DF	Tegen Su-Yin Butler	25 December 2008 (aged 16)	2	0	(United States Soccer Federation) Davenport Iowa
20	MF	Nurhadfina Mohd Firdaus	2 September 2004 (aged 21)	11	0	(Football Association of Malaysia) Selangor
8	MF	Nur Najwa Irdina Zaidi	26 September 2006 (aged 19)	9	1	(Football Association of Malaysia) Selangor
7	MF	Jaciah Jumilis	23 July 1991 (aged 34)	72	5	(Football Association of Malaysia) Sabah
6	MF	Haindee Mosroh	17 April 1993 (aged 32)	40	6	(Football Association of Malaysia) Sabah
17	MF	Nur Syafiqah Zainal Abidin	27 December 2001 (aged 23)	19	0	(Football Association of Malaysia) MBSJ
9	MF	Nur Lyana Soberi	18 June 1999 (aged 26)	30	0	(Football Association of Malaysia) Kelana United
21	FW	Henrietta Justine	19 August 2002 (aged 23)	19	1	(Football Association of Malaysia) Sabah
11	FW	Nur Adrienna Zamzaihiri	13 August 2004 (aged 21)	13	3	(Football Association of Malaysia) MBSJ
14	FW	Dian Aqilah Mohammed Imran	10 October 2007 (aged 18)	5	0	(Football Association of Malaysia) MBSJ
22	FW	Nur Ainsyah Murad	22 October 2003 (aged 22)	15	2	(Football Association of Malaysia) Selangor
15	FW	Intan Sarah	10 July 1999 (aged 26)	13	3	(Football Association of Malaysia) MBSJ
19	FW	Nur Laila Syamila A Rahim	7 June 2010 (aged 15)	0	0	(Football Association of Malaysia) Kuala Lumpur FA
13	FW	Nurfazira Muhammad Sani	13 November 2001 (aged 24)	16	2	(Football Association of Malaysia) Selangor
