= 2026 AYA Bank Tri-Nations Cup =

International invitational football tournament in Myanmar

Tournament details
- Host country: Myanmar
- Dates: 3–9 June
- Teams: 3 (from 1 confederation)
- Venue: Thuwunna Stadium (in 1 host city)

Final positions
- Champions: Thailand (1st title)
- Runners-up: Uzbekistan
- Third place: Myanmar

Tournament statistics
- Matches played: 3
- Goals scored: 4 (1.33 per match)
- Top scorer(s): May Htet Lu Nilufar Kudratova; Jiraporn Mongkoldee Thawanrat Promthongmee
- Best goalkeeper: Thichanan Sodchuen

The 2026 AYA Bank Tri-Nations Cup is a tri-nation international friendly match to be hosted in Yangon, Myanmar from 3–9 June 2026.

The match will feature three national women’s teams: Myanmar (host), Thailand, and Uzbekistan. Each team will play two matches, and the team with the highest number of points will win the cup.

AYA Bank is the title sponsor of the tournament.

== Ticket ==
Tickets price are 5,000 MMK for Grand Stand and 2,000 MMK for Ordinary Stand. Online Ticket can be purchase from AYA Pay.

== Participating nations ==
With FIFA Rankings, as of April 21, 2026.

- Myanmar (55) - first appearance - hosts
- Thailand (50) - first appearance
- Uzbekistan (53) - first appearance

== Venue ==
- All matches held at the Thuwunna Stadium, Yangon, Myanmar.

Yangon	2026 AYA Bank Tri-Nations Cup is located in Myanmar
Thuwunna Stadium	2026 AYA Bank Tri-Nations Cup is located in Myanmar
16°49′16.73″N 96°11′12.58″E	2026 AYA Bank Tri-Nations Cup is located in Myanmar
Capacity: 35,485 seats	2026 AYA Bank Tri-Nations Cup is located in Myanmar

== Squad Lists ==
=== Myanmar ===
Head coach: Mitsuo Kato

No.	Pos.	Player	Date of birth (age)	Caps	Goals	Club
1	GK	Ei Sandar Zaw	15 February 2000 (age 26)	2	0	(Myanmar Football Federation) Ayeyawady
18	GK	Hla Hla Htwe		0	0	(Myanmar Football Federation) YREO W.F.C.
22	GK	Myo Mya Mya Nyein	28 November 1999 (age 26)	23	0	(Myanmar Football Federation) Thitsar Arman
2	DF	May Thet Mon Myint	28 November 2004 (age 21)	18	1	(Myanmar Football Federation) Thitsar Arman
3	DF	Nan Phyu Phwe	9 May 2005 (age 21)	7	0	(Myanmar Football Federation) Ayeyawady
4	DF	Zune Yu Ya Oo	12 February 2001 (age 25)	30	0	(Myanmar Football Federation) Ayeyawady
14	DF	Lin Lae Oo	6 September 2002 (age 23)	13	0	(Myanmar Football Federation) ISPE
17	DF	Than Than Nwe	1 May 2003 (age 23)	6	0	(Myanmar Football Federation) ISPE
21	DF	Nan Sanay Ma	10 July 2004 (age 22)	0	0	(Myanmar Football Federation) Yangon United
23	DF	Yu Yu Naing	29 November 2007 (age 18)	9	1	(Myanmar Football Federation) Yangon United W.F.C.
24	DF	Khin Moe Win	6 November 2000 (age 25)	0	0	(Myanmar Football Federation) Ayeyawady
25	DF	Khin Myo Thandar Htun	9 March 2004 (age 22)	3	0	(Myanmar Football Federation) Shan United
5	MF	Phyu Phyu Win	12 January 2004 (age 22)	51	1	(Myanmar Football Federation) Ayeyawady
6	MF	Naw Htet Htet Wai	30 July 2000 (age 26)	31	0	(Myanmar Football Federation) Ayeyawady
10	MF	Khin Marlar Tun	21 September 1989 (age 36)	127	33	(Myanmar Football Federation) ISPE
11	MF	Yu Par Khaing	31 January 1996 (age 30)	35	4	(Myanmar Football Federation) Shan United
7	MF	Win Win	12 February 2003 (age 23)	12	8	(Myanmar Football Federation) Thitsar Arman
19	MF	Shwe Yee Tun	14 May 2003 (age 23)	11	6	(Myanmar Football Federation) ISPE
16	MF	Lin Myint Mo	9 June 2002 (age 24)	36	5	(Myanmar Football Federation) ISPE
12	MF	Hay Marn Soe	21 May 2005 (age 21)	0	0	(Myanmar Football Federation) ISPE
8	FW	San Thaw Thaw	2 January 2001 (age 25)	47	18	(Myanmar Football Federation) Ayeyawady
9	FW	Su Su Kyi		0	0	(Myanmar Football Federation) Yangon United
13	FW	May Htet Lu	29 January 2003 (age 23)	9	7	(United States Soccer Federation) UCLA
15	FW	Myat Noe Khin	24 July 2003 (age 23)	22	8	(Myanmar Football Federation) Thitsar Arman
20	FW	Zin Moe Pyae	15 January 2003 (age 23)	0	0	(Myanmar Football Federation) Yangon United

=== Thailand ===
Head coach: Nuengrutai Srathongvian

Thailand announced their final squad on 25 May 2026.

No.	Pos.	Player	Date of birth (age)	Caps	Goals	Club
1	GK	Chonthicha Panyarung	30 December 2008 (age 17)			(Football Association of Thailand) Khon Kaen Sports School
18	GK	Thichanan Sodchuen	1 February 2003 (age 23)			(Football Association of Thailand) BGC–College of Asian Scholars
22	GK	Panita Promrat	20 September 1998 (age 27)			(Football Association of Thailand) BGC–College of Asian Scholars
2	DF	Natcha Kaewanta	3 December 2006 (age 19)			(Football Association of Thailand) Chonburi
3	DF	Uraiporn Yongkul	17 August 1998 (age 28)			(Football Association of Thailand) BGC–College of Asian Scholars
4	DF	Panitha Jiratanaphibun	27 June 2004 (age 22)			(Chinese Football Association) Guangxi Pingguo
5	DF	Pinyaphat Klinklai	26 January 2008 (age 18)			(Football Association of Thailand) Bangkok
6	DF	Supaporn Inthraprasit	18 February 2004 (age 22)			(Football Association of Thailand) Chonburi
11	DF	Chatchawan Rodthong	22 June 2002 (age 24)			(Football Association of Thailand) Bangkok
17	DF	Parichat Thongrong	14 May 2006 (age 20)			(Football Association of Thailand) Kasem Bundit University
19	DF	Pitsamai Sornsai (captain)	19 January 1989 (age 37)			(Chinese Taipei Football Association) Taichung Blue Whale
7	MF	Khwanjira Ngok-wong	22 December 2003 (age 22)			(Football Association of Thailand) BGC–College of Asian Scholars
8	MF	Pluemjai Sontisawat	20 July 2003 (age 23)			(Football Association of Thailand) Chonburi
13	MF	Pichayatida Manowang	17 November 2006 (age 19)			(Football Association of Thailand) Bangkok
16	MF	Thawanrat Promthongmee	29 November 2004 (age 21)			(Football Association of Thailand) Chonburi
20	MF	Preechakorn Kruegeromchuom	4 December 2008 (age 17)			(Football Association of Thailand) Chonburi Sports School
9	FW	Jiraporn Mongkoldee	13 August 1998 (age 28)			(Chinese Football Association) Guangxi Pingguo
10	FW	Wiranya Kwaenkasikarm	7 July 2005 (age 21)			(Football Association of Thailand) Chonburi
12	FW	Natalie Ngosuwan	18 July 2002 (age 24)			(Football Australia) Preston Lions
14	FW	Saowalak Pengngam	30 November 1996 (age 29)			(Chinese Taipei Football Association) Taichung Blue Whale
15	FW	Kanjanathat Poomsri	17 January 2003 (age 23)			(Football Association of Thailand) Kasem Bundit University
21	FW	Pattaranan Aupachai	9 July 2002 (age 24)			(Football Association of Thailand) Chonburi
23	FW	Janista Jinantuya	9 September 2003 (age 22)			(Football Association of Thailand) Bangkok

=== Uzbekistan ===
Head coach: Kotryna Kulbytė

No.	Pos.	Player	Date of birth (age)	Caps	Goals	Club
1	GK	Maftuna Jonimqulova	26 July 1999 (age 27)	3	0	(Uzbekistan Football Association) Sevinch
12	GK	Kumushoy Gulomova	6 November 1999 (age 26)			(Uzbekistan Football Association) Sogdiana-W
13	GK	Zarina Saidova	19 September 2001 (age 24)			(Uzbekistan Football Association) Nasaf Qarshi
2	DF	Madina Khikmatova	9 August 2001 (age 25)			(Uzbekistan Football Association) Qizilqum-W
3	DF	Kholida Dadaboeva	12 April 1993 (age 33)			(Uzbekistan Football Association) FC Sogdiana Jizzakh
4	DF	Nazira Sayfitdinova	17 March 2007 (aged 19)			(Uzbekistan Football Association) Bunyodkor
14	DF	Rukhshona Olimjonova	28 November 2005 (age 20)			(Uzbekistan Football Association) FC AGMK
15	DF	Rukhshona Usarova	26 July 2007 (age 19)			(Uzbekistan Football Association) Sogdiana-W
22	DF	Sevinch Kuchkarova	28 November 2004 (age 21)			(Uzbekistan Football Association) FC AGMK
23	DF	Diyora Bakhtiyarova	29 August 2007 (aged 18)			(Uzbekistan Football Association) Bunyodkor
5	MF	Solikha Khusniddinova	22 January 1998 (age 28)			(Uzbekistan Football Association) Kocaeli Bayan FK
6	MF	Dilrabo Asadova	22 December 1996 (age 29)			(Uzbekistan Football Association) Zvezda-2005
8	MF	Ilvina Ablyakimova	27 April 1995 (age 31)			(Uzbekistan Football Association) Bunyodkor-W
9	MF	Feruza Tadiboeva	6 January 1994 (age 32)			(Uzbekistan Football Association) Bunyodkor-W
16	MF	Zarina Mamatkarimova	4 March 2004 (age 22)			(Uzbekistan Football Association) Sevinch
20	MF	Mehribon Egamberdieva	9 October 2007 (aged 18)			(Uzbekistan Football Association) Nasaf Qarshi
7	FW	Nilufa Kudratova	5 June 1997 (age 29)			(Uzbekistan Football Association) Nasaf Qarshi
10	FW	Diyorakhon Khabibullaeva	15 October 1999 (age 26)			(Turkish Football Federation) Trabzonspor FC
17	FW	Lyudmila Karachik	6 January 1994 (age 32)			(Uzbekistan Football Association) Nasaf Qarshi
18	FW	Zarina Mamatkarimova	4 March 2004 (age 22)			(Uzbekistan Football Association) Sevinch
19	FW	Oydinoy Turgunova	15 March 2006 (age 20)			(Uzbekistan Football Association) FC AGMK

== Standings ==
Pos	Team	Pld	W	D	L	GF	GA	GD	Pts	
1	Thailand	2	1	1	0	2	1	+1	4	Champion
2	Uzbekistan	2	1	0	1	1	1	0	3	
3	Myanmar	2	0	1	1	1	2	−1	1	

Updated to match(es) played on unknown. Source:

== Results ==
3 June AYA Bank Tri-Nations Cup	Myanmar	0–1	Uzbekistan	Yangon, Myanmar
16:00 UTC+6:30			Nilufar Kudratova 22'	Stadium: Thuwunna Stadium

6 June AYA Bank Tri-Nations Cup	Thailand	1–0	Uzbekistan	Yangon, Myanmar
16:00 UTC+6:30	Jiraporn Mongkoldee 6'			Stadium: Thuwunna Stadium

9 June AYA Bank Tri-Nations Cup	Myanmar	1 - 1	Thailand	Yangon, Myanmar
16:00 UTC+6:30	May Hte Lu 50'		Thawanrat Promthongmee 55'	Stadium: Thuwunna Stadium; Referee: Pichakara Plong

== Winners ==
2026 AYA Bank Tri Nations Cup champion

Thailand

== Goalscorers ==
=== Top scorers ===
As of 9 June 2026

Rank	Player	Nation	Goals
1	Nilufar Kudratova	Uzbekistan	1
1	Jiraporn Mongkoldee	Thailand	1
1	Thawanrat Promthongmee	Thailand	1
1	May Htet Lu	Myanmar	1

=== Clean sheets ===
As of

Rank	Player	Nation	Clean sheets
1	Maftuna Jonimqulova	Uzbekistan	1
1	Sodchuen	Thailand	1

== Broadcasting rights ==
Territory	Rights holder	Ref.
Myanmar	Pyone Play Sports YouTube, Reader Channel	
Uzbekistan	YouTube	
Thailand	YouTube,	

== Sponsor ==
- AYA Bank
- AYA Pay
- AYA Sompo
- Jogarbola
- Novotel
- Mega Group
- Dong Luc
- Alpine
- Royal-D
- Fresh Air con

== Brocasting ==
- MRTV-4

== See also ==
- 2016 AYA Bank Cup
- Myanmar Women League
- Myanmar women's national football team
- Thailand women's national football team
- Uzbekistan women's national football team
- Myanmar Football Federation
