= 2024 Thai Women's League 1 =

Thai Women's League 1
- Season: 2024
- Dates: 2 March 2024 – 7 July 2024
- Champions: College of Asian Scholars
- Relegated: Khon Kaen Sports School; Bangkok Sports School
- AFC Champions League: College of Asian Scholars
- Matches: 56
- Goals: 213 (3.8 per match)
- Top goalscorer: (Thailand) Jiraporn Mongkoldee (19 goals; Bangkok)
- Best goalkeeper: (Thailand) Chotmanee Thongmongkol (9 clean sheets; Bangkok)
- Biggest home win: 10 goals difference Bangkok 10–0 Bangkok Sports School (15 March 2024)
- Biggest away win: 7 goals difference Surin Hinkhon United 0–7 College of Asian Scholars (9 June 2024)
- Highest scoring: 10 goals Bangkok 10–0 Bangkok Sports School (15 March 2024)
- Longest winning run: 9 matches Bangkok
- Longest unbeaten run: 12 matches Bangkok
- Longest winless run: 13 matches Khon Kaen Sports School
- Longest losing run: 6 matches Surin Hinkhon United

The 2024 Thai Women's League 1 is the 10th season of the Thai Women's League 1, the top Thai professional league for women's association football clubs, since its establishment in 2009. A total of 8 teams will compete in the league.

== Teams ==
=== Number of teams by province ===
Position	Province	Number	Teams
1	Bangkok	3	Bangkok, Bangkok Sports School, and Kasem Bundit University
2	Chonburi	2	Chonburi and Chonburi Sports School
2	Khon Kaen	2	College of Asian Scholars and Khon Kaen Sports School
4	Surin	1	Surin Hinkhon United

=== Stadiums and locations ===
Locations of the 2024 Thai Women's League 1 teams

Team	Location	Stadium	Coordinates
Bangkok	Bangkok (Min Buri)	72nd Anniversary Stadium, Min Buri	13°48′08″N 100°47′28″E
Bangkok Sports School	Bangkok (Thung Khru)	72nd Anniversary Stadium, Bang Mot	13°38′48″N 100°29′34″E
Chonburi	Chonburi (Mueang)	Chonburi UTA Stadium	13°20′10″N 100°57′23″E
Chonburi Sports School	Chonburi (Mueang)	Stadium of Thailand National Sports University, Chonburi Campus	13°24′41″N 100°59′37″E
College of Asian Scholars	Khon Kaen (Phon)	Unif Park	15°49′30″N 102°36′46″E
Kasem Bundit University	Bangkok (Min Buri)	Stadium of Kasem Bundit University	13°48′06″N 100°44′06″E
Khon Kaen Sports School	Khon Kaen (Mueang)	Stadium of Khon Kaen Sports School	16°27′21″N 102°56′49″E
Surin Hinkhon United	Surin (Kap Choeng)	Khok Takhian Stadium	14°33′30″N 103°30′16″E

Locations of teams in Bangkok Metropolitan region

=== Foreign players ===
A Thai Women's League 1 team could register 3 foreign players from foreign players all around the world. A team can use 3 foreign players on the field in each game.

Note :
(substituted off) : players who released during second leg transfer window;
(substituted on) : players who registered during second leg transfer window.

AFC member countries players.
CAF member countries players.
CONCACAF member countries players.
CONMEBOL member countries players.
OFC member countries players.
UEFA member countries players.
No foreign player registered.

Club	Leg	Player 1	Player 2	Player 3
Bangkok	1st
Bangkok	2nd
Bangkok Sports School	1st
Bangkok Sports School	2nd
Chonburi	1st
Chonburi	2nd
Chonburi Sports School	1st
Chonburi Sports School	2nd
College of Asian Scholars	1st	(Myanmar) Khin Marlar Tun
College of Asian Scholars	2nd	(Myanmar) Khin Marlar Tun
Kasem Bundit University	1st
Kasem Bundit University	2nd
Khon Kaen Sports School	1st
Khon Kaen Sports School	2nd
Surin Hinkhon United	1st
Surin Hinkhon United	2nd

== League table ==
=== Standings ===
Pos	Team	Pld	W	D	L	GF	GA	GD	Pts	Qualification or relegation
1	College of Asian Scholars (C, Q)	14	13	0	1	55	6	+49	39	Qualification for 2024–25 AFC Women's Champions League
2	Bangkok	14	11	1	2	48	6	+42	34	
3	Chonburi	14	9	1	4	45	12	+33	28	
4	Kasem Bundit University	14	8	2	4	26	15	+11	26	
5	Chonburi Sports School	14	4	2	8	17	33	−16	14	
6	Surin Hinkhon United	14	3	1	10	10	39	−29	10	
7	Khon Kaen Sports School (R)	14	1	4	9	6	46	−40	7	Relegation to 2025 Thai Women's League 2
8	Bangkok Sports School (R)	14	1	1	12	6	56	−50	4	Relegation to 2025 Thai Women's League 2

Source: Thai League
Rules for classification: 1) Points; 2) Head-to-head points; 3) Head-to-head goal difference; 4) Head-to-head goal scored; 5) Overall goal difference; 6) Overall goal scored; 7) Fair play points; 8) Play-off without extra time).
(C) Champions; (Q) Qualified for the phase indicated; (R) Relegated

=== Positions by round ===
Team ╲ Round	1	2	3	4	5	6	7	8	9	10	11	12	13	14
College of Asian Scholars	2	2	1	1	1	1	1	1	1	1	1	1	1	1
Bangkok	7	4	3	2	2	2	2	2	2	2	2	2	2	2
Chonburi	1	1	4	3	3	3	3	3	3	3	3	3	3	3
Kasem Bundit University	4	5	5	4	4	4	4	4	4	4	4	4	4	4
Chonburi Sports School	3	6	6	6	6	6	6	6	6	5	5	5	5	5
Surin Hinkhon United	6	3	2	5	5	5	5	5	5	6	6	6	6	6
Khon Kaen Sports School	5	7	7	7	7	7	7	7	7	7	7	7	8	7
Bangkok Sports School	8	8	8	8	8	8	8	8	8	8	8	8	7	8

Source: Thai League
= Leader and qualification for 2024–25 AFC Women's Champions League; = Relegation to 2025 Thai Women's League 2

=== Results by round ===
Team ╲ Round	1	2	3	4	5	6	7	8	9	10	11	12	13	14
College of Asian Scholars	W	W	W	W	W	W	L	W	W	W	W	W	W	W
Bangkok	L	W	W	D	W	W	W	W	W	W	W	W	W	L
Chonburi	W	W	L	D	W	W	W	W	L	L	W	W	L	W
Kasem Bundit University	D	L	W	W	W	L	W	L	W	D	W	L	W	W
Chonburi Sports School	D	L	L	W	L	L	D	L	W	W	L	L	W	L
Surin Hinkhon United	D	W	W	L	L	L	L	W	L	L	L	L	L	L
Khon Kaen Sports School	D	L	L	L	L	D	D	L	L	D	L	L	L	W
Bangkok Sports School	L	L	L	L	L	D	L	L	L	L	L	W	L	L

Source: Thai League
W = Won; D = Drawn; L = Lost

=== Results ===
Home \ Away	BKK	BKS	CBR	CBS	CAS	KBU	KKS	SHU
Bangkok	—	10–0	3–1	4–2	1–2	2–0	8–0	3–0
Bangkok Sports School	0–3	—	0–5	1–3	0–4	1–2	1–1	0–1
Chonburi	0–0	8–0	—	2–1	2–1	0–1	8–0	7–0
Chonburi Sports School	0–3	2–1	0–4	—	0–5	0–0	2–0	3–0
College of Asian Scholars	1–0	9–0	3–0	4–1	—	2–0	6–1	3–0
Kasem Bundit University	0–3	5–1	2–1	6–3	1–2	—	3–0	3–0
Khon Kaen Sports School	0–6	0–1	0–3	0–0	0–6	0–0	—	4–2
Surin Hinkhon United	0–2	3–0	1–4	3–0	0–7	0–3	0–0	—

Source: Thai League
Legend: Blue = home team win; Yellow = draw; Red = away team win.
For upcoming matches, an "a" indicates there is an article about the rivalry between the two participants.

== Season statistics ==
=== Top scorers ===
As of 7 July 2024.

Rank	Player	Club	Goals
1	(Thailand) Jiraporn Mongkoldee	Bangkok	19
2	(Thailand) Kurisara Limpawanich	College of Asian Scholars	14
3	(Thailand) Rasita Taobao	Chonburi Sports School	9
3	(Myanmar) Khin Marlar Tun	College of Asian Scholars	9
3	(Thailand) Orapin Waenngoen	College of Asian Scholars	9
3	(Thailand) Karnjanathat Phomsri	Kasem Bundit University	9
7	(Thailand) Thawanrat Promthongmee	Chonburi	7
8	(Thailand) Jaruwan Chaiyarak	Chonburi	6
8	(Thailand) Pattaranan Aupachai	Chonburi	6

=== Hat-tricks ===
Player	For	Against	Result	Date
(Thailand) Jiraporn Mongkoldee^{4}	Bangkok	Bangkok Sports School	10–0 (H)	15 March 2024
(Thailand) Ploychompoo Somnuek	Bangkok	Bangkok Sports School	10–0 (H)	15 March 2024
(Myanmar) Khin Marlar Tun	College of Asian Scholars	Khon Kaen Sports School	6–0 (A)	17 March 2024
(Thailand) Jiraporn Mongkoldee	Bangkok	Khon Kaen Sports School	6–0 (A)	21 April 2024
(Thailand) Thawanrat Promthongmee^{4}	Chonburi	Khon Kaen Sports School	8–0 (H)	26 May 2024
(Thailand) Kurisara Limpawanich	College of Asian Scholars	Khon Kaen Sports School	6–1 (H)	2 June 2024
(Thailand) Kurisara Limpawanich	College of Asian Scholars	Bangkok Sports School	9–0 (H)	15 June 2024
(Thailand) Orapin Waenngoen	College of Asian Scholars	Bangkok Sports School	9–0 (H)	15 June 2024
(Thailand) Jiraporn Mongkoldee^{5}	Bangkok	Khon Kaen Sports School	8–0 (H)	15 June 2024
(Thailand) Rasita Taobao	Chonburi Sports School	Kasem Bundit University	3–6 (A)	6 July 2024

Notes: ^{5} = Player scored 5 goals; ^{4} = Player scored 4 goals; (H) = Home team; (A) = Away team

=== Clean sheets ===
As of 7 July 2024.

Rank	Player	Club	Clean sheets
1	(Thailand) Chotmanee Thongmongkol	Bangkok	9
2	(Thailand) Pawarisa Homyamyen	Chonburi	6
3	(Thailand) Panita Phomrat	College of Asian Scholars	5
4	(Thailand) Jidapa Phara	College of Asian Scholars	4
5	(Thailand) Chonticha Panyarung	Khon Kaen Sports School	3
5	(Thailand) Pruksa Maliwan	Surin Hinkhon United	3
