= Hali Long =

Filipino footballer (born 1995)

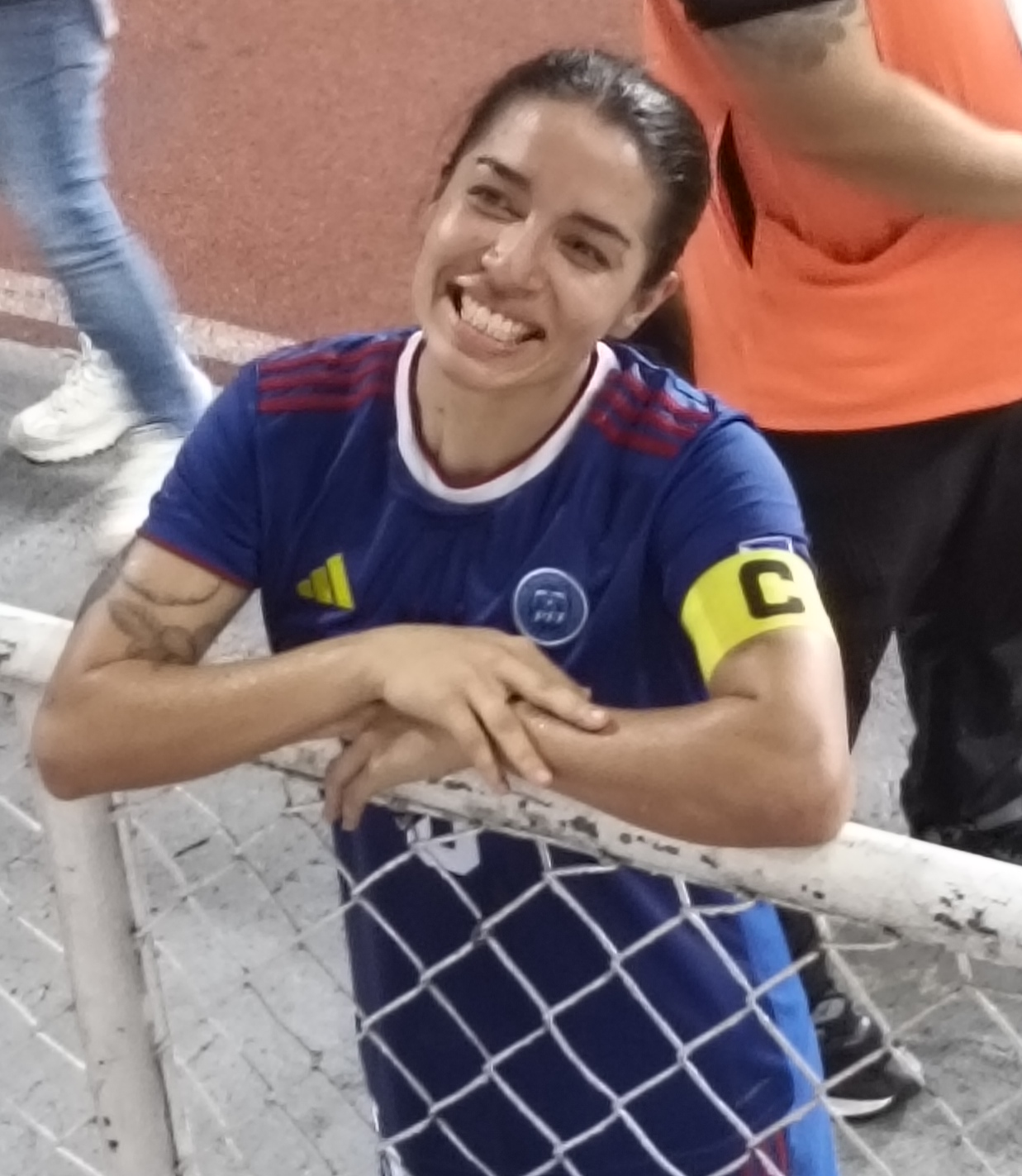
- Long with the Philippines in 2025

Personal information
- Full name: Hali Moriah Candido Long
- Birth name: Hali Moriah Long
- Date of birth: January 21, 1995 (age 31)
- Place of birth: Cape Girardeau, Missouri, U.S.
- Height: 5 ft 7 in (1.70 m)
- Position: Center-back

Team information
- Current team: Brisbane Roar
- Number: 15

Youth career
- Lou Fusz-Wipke

College career
Years	Team	Apps	(Gls)
2013–2016	Little Rock Trojans	71	(1)

Senior career*
Years	Team	Apps	(Gls)
2019–2025	Kaya–Iloilo		
2025	→ College of Asian Scholars		
2026	College of Asian Scholars	10	(2)
2026–	Brisbane Roar	5	(0)

International career^{‡}
2016–	Philippines	110	(22)
Medal record
Representing the Philippines
ASEAN Women's Championship
Winner	2022 Philippines	Team
Southeast Asian Games
Winner	2025 Thailand	Team
Bronze medal – third place	2021 Vietnam	Team
- * Club domestic league appearances and goals as of November 15, 2026 ‡ National team caps and goals as of September 25, 2026

Hali Moriah Candido Long (born January 21, 1995) is a professional women's footballer who plays as a center-back for Brisbane Roar of the A-League Women. Born in the United States, she captains the Philippines women's national team.

== Early life and education ==
Hali Long was born in Cape Girardeau, Missouri, to Lilie Candido and David Long. She studied at Francis Howell North High School in St. Charles, lettering in all four years in her secondary education and at the University of Arkansas at Little Rock. She was named to the Sun Belt Conference Commissioner's List for maintaining a GPA (grade point average) of 3.0 or better for the 2013–14 and 2014–15 school years.

== Career ==
=== Youth and college ===
Long played for the under-18 team of Lou Fusz-Wipke, helping the youth club win three state championships. She played for the Little Rock Trojans women's soccer team from 2013 to 2016. She made her first career assist in 2014 against Southern and her first career goal in 2016 against Memphis. In 2015 she played the most minutes among players of the Little Rock Trojans women's soccer team. She also started every game, one of only three players on that year's roster to do so.

=== Club career ===
==== Kaya–Iloilo ====
Long played for Kaya–Iloilo in the PFF Women's League. She played with them in the 2022 PFF Women's Cup where her side finished third. She also won two league titles with Kaya, in the 2023 and 2025 seasons. She also played for Kaya in the 2024–25 AFC Women's Champions League.

==== College of Asian Scholars ====
Long was loaned to Thai side BGC–College of Asian Scholars for the preliminary round of the 2025–26 AFC Women's Champions League. She later played for the club in the Thai Women's League 1 helping them win the 2026 season. Long was named Most Valuable Player.

==== Brisbane Roar ====
After her stint in Thailand, Long moved to Australia. Brisbane Roar of the A-League Women announced in September 2026 that they have signed her ahead of the 2026–27 season.

=== International ===
Long was born in the United States to an American father and Filipino mother. In June 2016, Long joined a training camp by the Philippine national team. She was then selected to be part of the Philippine squad to participate at the 2016 AFF Women's Championship in Myanmar. This was the first time that a Trojans player competed on a senior national team. She also played at the 2018 AFC Women's Asian Cup qualifiers in April 2017 scoring a hat-trick in the match against Tajikistan. The team managed to secure qualification for the final tournament in Jordan.

She was also part of the Philippine roster for the 2017 Southeast Asian Games and the 2018, and 2022 AFC Women's Asian Cup.

Long continued to play for the Philippines in the 2023 FIFA Women's World Cup, where she was a starting center back.

Long is part of the Philippine squad for the 2025 SEA Games in Thailand. The semifinal match against the host marked Long's 100th cap for the national team. The Philippines drew Thailand 1–1 in extra time but the former advanced to its first ever SEA Games women's football final after prevailing in the penalty shootouts.

She is part of the Philippines' squad for the 2026 Asian Games in Aichi and Nagoya, Japan. She became the player who have played the most games for the Philippines of any gender, when she made her 109th cap for her country in their 1–5 defeat to China on September 21, 2026.

== International goals ==
Scores and results list the Philippines' goal tally first.

#	Date	Venue	Opponent	Score	Result	Competition
1.	April 5, 2017	Pamir Stadium, Dushanbe, Tajikistan	Iraq	2–0	4–0	2018 AFC Women's Asian Cup qualification
2.	April 7, 2017	Pamir Stadium, Dushanbe, Tajikistan	Tajikistan	3–0	8–0	2018 AFC Women's Asian Cup qualification
3.	April 7, 2017	Pamir Stadium, Dushanbe, Tajikistan	Tajikistan	5–0	8–0	2018 AFC Women's Asian Cup qualification
4.	April 7, 2017	Pamir Stadium, Dushanbe, Tajikistan	Tajikistan	6–0	8–0	2018 AFC Women's Asian Cup qualification
5.	August 24, 2017	UiTM Stadium, Shah Alam, Malaysia	Thailand	1–3	1–3	2017 Southeast Asian Games
6.	November 4, 2018	Hisor Central Stadium, Hisor, Tajikistan	Singapore	4–0	9–0	2020 AFC Women's Olympic Qualifying Tournament
7.	November 4, 2018	Hisor Central Stadium, Hisor, Tajikistan	Singapore	8–0	9–0	2020 AFC Women's Olympic Qualifying Tournament
8.	August 3, 2019	PFF National Training Centre, Carmona, Philippines	Macau	9–0	11–0	Friendly
9.	August 15, 2019	IPE Chonburi Stadium, Chonburi, Thailand	Malaysia	2–0	3–0	2019 AFF Women's Championship
10.	August 17, 2019	IPE Chonburi Stadium, Chonburi, Thailand	Timor-Leste	5–0	7–0	2019 AFF Women's Championship
11.	August 17, 2019	IPE Chonburi Stadium, Chonburi, Thailand	Timor-Leste	6–0	7–0	2019 AFF Women's Championship
12.	April 22, 2022	Wanderers Football Park, Sydney, Australia	Tonga	2–0	16–0	Friendly
13.	April 22, 2022	Wanderers Football Park, Sydney, Australia	Tonga	7–0	16–0	Friendly
14.	April 22, 2022	Wanderers Football Park, Sydney, Australia	Tonga	15–0	16–0	Friendly
15.	July 15, 2022	Rizal Memorial Stadium, Manila, Philippines	Vietnam	1–0	4–0	2022 AFF Women's Championship
16.	November 12, 2022	Estadio Sausalito, Viña del Mar, Chile	Chile	1–0	1–1	Friendly
17.	April 5, 2023	Hisor Central Stadium, Hisor, Tajikistan	Pakistan	1–0	4–0	2024 AFC Women's Olympic Qualifying Tournament
18.	May 9, 2023	RSN Stadium, Phnom Penh, Cambodia	Vietnam	2–1	2–1	2023 Southeast Asian Games
19.	April 4, 2025	Theyab Awana Stadium Dubai, United Arab Emirates	United Arab Emirates	1–0	4–1	Friendly
20.	April 8, 2025	Theyab Awana Stadium Dubai, United Arab Emirates	United Arab Emirates	2–0	4–0	Friendly
21.	July 2, 2025	Olympic Stadium, Phnom Penh, Cambodia	Cambodia	5–0	6–0	2026 AFC Women's Asian Cup qualification
22.	August 7, 2025	Việt Trì Stadium, Phú Thọ, Vietnam	Timor-Leste	3–0	7–0	2025 ASEAN Women's Championship

== Honors ==
Kaya–Iloilo

- PFF Women's League: 2023, 2025
- SingaCup Women's Football Championship: 2022

College of Asian Scholars

- Thai Women's League 1: 2026

Philippines

- ASEAN Women's Championship: 2022
- Southeast Asian Games: 2025

Individual

- PFF Women's League Most Valuable Player: 2025
- Thai Women's League Most Valuable Player: 2025–26
