= Phornphirun Philawan =

Thai footballer (born 1999)

Personal information
- Date of birth: 8 April 1999 (age 27)
- Place of birth: Udon Thani, Thailand
- Height: 1.66 m (5 ft 5 in)
- Position: Defender

Team information
- Current team: BG Bundit Asia
- Number: 3

Senior career*
Years	Team	Apps	(Gls)
2018–2021	College of Asian Scholars		
2022	MyNavi Sendai	2	(0)
2023–2024	College of Asian Scholars		
2024	Foshan Shanshui Tieniu		
2024-	BG Bundit Asia	3	(0)

International career^{‡}
2017	Thailand U20		
2019–	Thailand	10	(0)
- * Club domestic league appearances and goals as of 9 July 2023 ‡ National team caps and goals as of 19 September 2022

Phornphirun Philawan (born 8 April 1999) is a Thai professional footballer who plays as a defender for BG Bundit Asia and the Thailand national team.

== Career ==
She participated in the 2017 AFC U-19 Women's Championship. She was selected for the 2019 FIFA Women's World Cup.

== Honours ==
Individual

- Thai Women's League MVP Award: 2022
