= Duangnapa Sritala =

Thai footballer (born 1986)

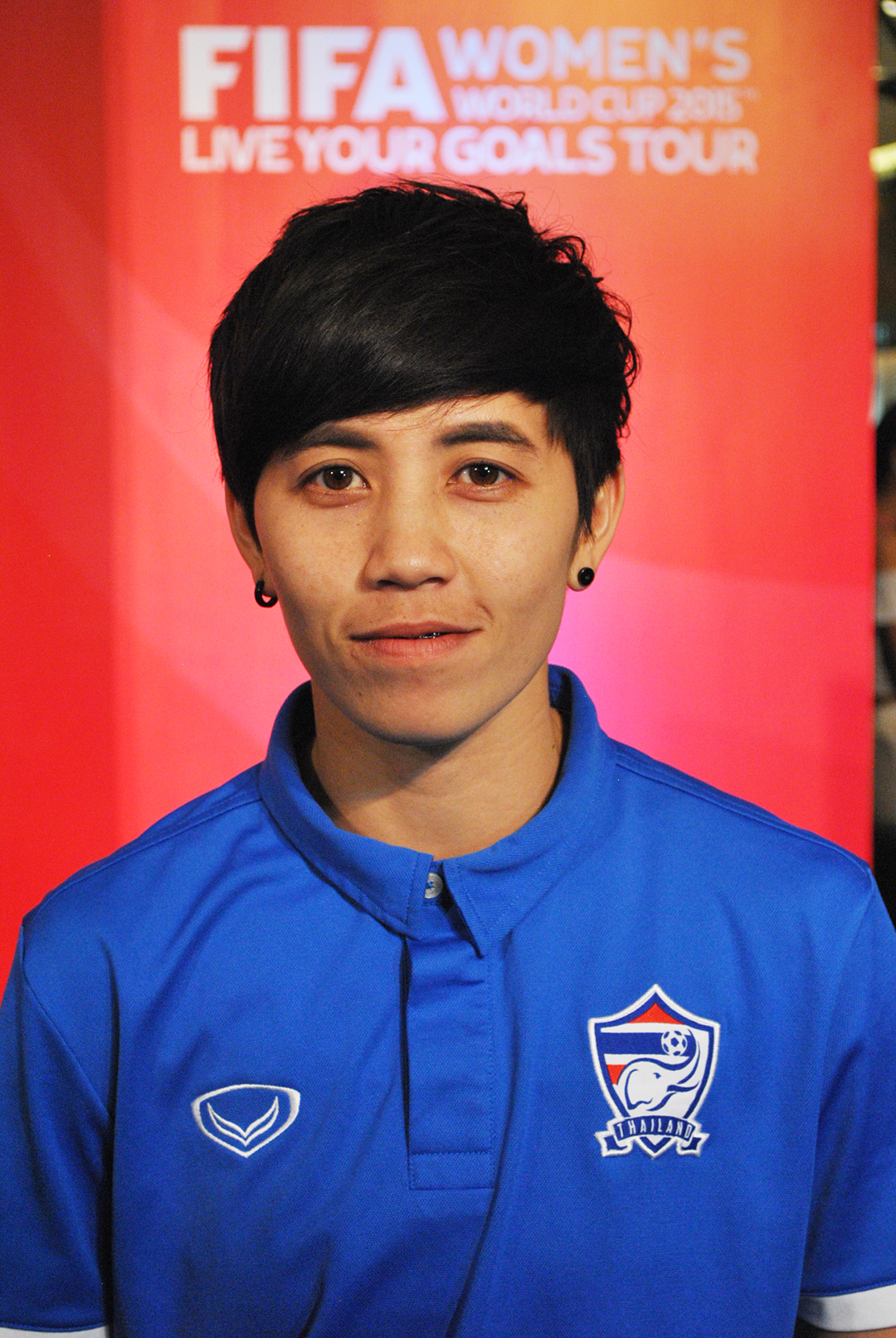

Personal information
- Full name: Duangnapa Sritala
- Date of birth: 4 February 1986 (age 40)
- Place of birth: Kamphaeng Phet, Thailand
- Height: 1.60 m (5 ft 3 in)
- Position: Defender

Team information
- Current team: Bangkok
- Number: 98

International career^{‡}
Years	Team	Apps	(Gls)
2008–	Thailand	117	(3)
- ‡ National team caps and goals as of 22:21, 17 June 2015 (UTC)

Duangnapa Sritala (Thai: ดวงนภา ศรีตะลา; RTGS: Duangnapha Si-tala; born 4 February 1986) is a Thai international footballer who plays as a defender for Bangkok.

== International goals ==
No.	Date	Venue	Opponent	Score	Result	Competition
1.	22 September 2012	Thống Nhất Stadium, Ho Chi Minh City, Vietnam	Laos	9–0	14–1	2012 AFF Women's Championship
2.	19 May 2014	Gò Đậu Stadium, Thủ Dầu Một, Vietnam	Myanmar	2–1	2–1	2014 AFC Women's Asian Cup
