= 2025 Thai Women's League 1 =

Thai Women's League 1
- Season: 2025
- Dates: 1 February 2025 – 22 May 2025
- Champions: College of Asian Scholars
- Relegated: Khelang United; Surin Hinkhon United
- AFC Champions League: College of Asian Scholars
- Matches: 56
- Goals: 262 (4.68 per match)
- Top goalscorer: (Thailand) Kurisara Limpawanich (19 goals; College of Asian Scholars)
- Best goalkeeper: (Thailand) Thichanan Sodchuen (8 clean sheets; College of Asian Scholars)
- Biggest home win: 10 goals difference Chonburi 10–0 Surin Hinkhon (30 April 2025); Nakhon Si Thammarat 10–0 Surin Hinkhon (10 May 2025)
- Biggest away win: 10 goals difference Surin Hinkhon 0–10 College of Asian Scholars (27 April 2025)
- Highest scoring: 13 goals College of Asian Scholars 11–2 Khelang United (9 February 2025); Bangkok 11–2 Khelang United (21 May 2025)
- Longest winning run: 8 matches College of Asian Scholars
- Longest unbeaten run: 14 matches College of Asian Scholars
- Longest winless run: 9 matches Surin Hinkhon United
- Longest losing run: 7 matches Surin Hinkhon United

The 2025 Thai Women's League 1 was the 11th season of the Thai Women's League 1, the top Thai professional league for women's association football clubs, since its establishment in 2009. A total of 8 teams competed in the league.

== Teams ==
=== Number of teams by province ===
Position	Province	Number	Teams
1	Bangkok	2	Bangkok and Kasem Bundit University
2	Chonburi	2	Chonburi and Chonburi Sports School
3	Khon Kaen	1	College of Asian Scholars
3	Lampang	1	Khelang United
3	Nakhon Si Thammarat	1	Nakhon Si Thammarat Sports School
3	Surin	1	Surin Hinkhon United

=== Stadiums and locations ===
Locations of the 2025 Thai Women's League 1 teams

Team	Location	Stadium	Coordinates
Bangkok	Bangkok (Min Buri)	72nd Anniversary Stadium, Min Buri	13°48′08″N 100°47′28″E
Chonburi	Chonburi (Mueang)	Chonburi Daikin Stadium	13°20′10″N 100°57′23″E
Chonburi Sports School	Chonburi (Mueang)	Chonburi Training Ground	13°24′35″N 100°59′44″E
College of Asian Scholars	Khon Kaen (Phon)	Unif Park	15°49′34″N 102°36′46″E
Kasem Bundit University	Bangkok (Min Buri)	Stadium of Kasem Bundit University	13°48′06″N 100°44′06″E
Khelang United	Lampang (Mueang)	Stadium of Lampang Sports School	18°19′14″N 99°29′13″E
Nakhon Si Thammarat Sports School	Nakhon Si Thammarat (Thung Song)	Stadium of Nakhon Si Thammarat Sports School	8°11′06″N 99°37′08″E
Surin Hinkhon United	Surin (Kap Choeng)	Khok Takhian Stadium	14°33′30″N 103°30′16″E

=== Foreign players ===
A Thai Women's League 1 team could register 3 foreign players from foreign players all around the world. A team can use 3 foreign players on the field in each game.

Note :
(substituted off) : players who released during second leg transfer window;
(substituted on) : players who registered during second leg transfer window.

AFC member countries players.
CAF member countries players.
CONCACAF member countries players.
CONMEBOL member countries players.
OFC member countries players.
UEFA member countries players.
No foreign player registered.

Club	Leg	Player 1	Player 2	Player 3
Bangkok	1st	(China) Han Yixue	(Cambodia) Yon Yoeurn	(Cambodia) Hok Saody
Bangkok	2nd	(China) Han Yixue	(Cambodia) Yon Yoeurn	(Cambodia) Hok Saody
Chonburi	1st
Chonburi	2nd
Chonburi Sports School	1st
Chonburi Sports School	2nd
College of Asian Scholars	1st	(Cameroon) Genevieve Ngo Mbeleck	(Cameroon) Louise Mvilongo Bella	(Nigeria) Winifred Grace Eyebhoria
College of Asian Scholars	2nd	(Cameroon) Genevieve Ngo Mbeleck	(Cameroon) Louise Mvilongo Bella	(Nigeria) Winifred Grace Eyebhoria
Kasem Bundit University	1st
Kasem Bundit University	2nd
Khelang United	1st
Khelang United	2nd
Nakhon Si Thammarat Sports School	1st
Nakhon Si Thammarat Sports School	2nd
Surin Hinkhon United	1st
Surin Hinkhon United	2nd

== League table ==
=== Standings ===
Pos	Team	Pld	W	D	L	GF	GA	GD	Pts	Qualification or relegation
1	College of Asian Scholars (C, Q)	14	13	1	0	62	8	+54	40	Qualification for 2025–26 AFC Women's Champions League
2	Chonburi	14	11	1	2	60	12	+48	34	
3	Bangkok	14	10	1	3	47	14	+33	31	
4	Kasem Bundit University	14	8	0	6	30	24	+6	24	
5	Nakhon Si Thammarat Sports School	14	4	2	8	24	24	0	14	
6	Chonburi Sports School	14	3	2	9	21	41	−20	11	
7	Khelang United (R)	14	2	0	12	11	74	−63	6	Relegation to 2026 Thai Women's League 2
8	Surin Hinkhon United (R)	14	1	1	12	7	65	−58	4	Relegation to 2026 Thai Women's League 2

Source: Thai League
Rules for classification: 1) Points; 2) Head-to-head points; 3) Head-to-head goal difference; 4) Head-to-head goal scored; 5) Overall goal difference; 6) Overall goal scored; 7) Fair play points; 8) Play-off without extra time).
(C) Champions; (Q) Qualified for the phase indicated; (R) Relegated

=== Positions by round ===
Team ╲ Round	1	2	3	4	5	6	7	8	9	10	11	12	13	14
College of Asian Scholars	2	1	1	1	1	1	1	1	1	1	1	1	1	1
Chonburi	3	2	2	2	2	2	2	2	2	2	2	2	2	2
Bangkok	4	3	5	5	4	4	3	3	3	3	3	3	3	3
Kasem Bundit University	6	5	3	3	3	3	4	4	4	4	4	4	4	4
Nakhon Si Thammarat Sports School	5	6	6	4	5	5	5	6	6	5	5	5	5	5
Chonburi Sports School	1	4	4	6	6	6	6	5	5	6	6	6	6	6
Khelang United	7	8	8	8	8	8	8	8	8	8	8	7	7	7
Surin Hinkhon United	8	7	7	7	7	7	7	7	7	7	7	8	8	8

Source: Thai League
= Leader and qualification for 2025–26 AFC Women's Champions League; = Relegation to 2026 Thai Women's League 2

=== Results by round ===
Team ╲ Round	1	2	3	4	5	6	7	8	9	10	11	12	13	14
College of Asian Scholars	W	W	W	W	W	D	W	W	W	W	W	W	W	W
Chonburi	W	W	W	W	W	D	W	W	W	W	L	W	L	W
Bangkok	D	W	L	L	W	W	W	W	W	L	W	W	W	W
Kasem Bundit University	L	W	W	W	L	W	L	L	W	W	W	L	W	L
Nakhon Si Thammarat Sports School	D	L	D	W	L	L	L	L	L	W	W	L	W	L
Chonburi Sports School	W	L	D	L	L	L	D	W	L	L	L	L	L	W
Khelang United	L	L	L	L	L	W	L	L	L	L	L	W	L	L
Surin Hinkhon United	L	L	L	L	W	L	D	L	L	L	L	L	L	L

Source: Thai League
W = Won; D = Drawn; L = Lost

=== Results ===
Home \ Away	BKK	CBR	CBS	CAS	KBU	KLU	NSS	SHU
Bangkok	—	2–1	2–0	0–1	3–2	11–2	3–0	7–1
Chonburi	3–1	—	8–0	1–1	2–1	9–1	6–1	10–0
Chonburi Sports School	2–3	1–5	—	1–4	2–3	3–0	0–1	2–2
College of Asian Scholars	2–1	3–2	8–0	—	1–0	11–2	1–0	4–0
Kasem Bundit University	0–4	1–5	3–1	1–2	—	7–0	3–2	4–1
Khelang United	0–4	0–4	0–4	0–9	1–2	—	2–1	3–1
Nakhon Si Thammarat Sports School	0–0	0–1	1–1	0–5	0–2	7–0	—	10–0
Surin Hinkhon United	0–6	0–3	1–4	0–10	0–1	1–0	0–1	—

Source: Thai League
Legend: Blue = home team win; Yellow = draw; Red = away team win.
For upcoming matches, an "a" indicates there is an article about the rivalry between the two participants.

== Season statistics ==
=== Top scorers ===
As of 22 May 2025.

Rank	Player	Club	Goals
1	(Thailand) Kurisara Limpawanich	College of Asian Scholars	19
2	(Thailand) Kanyanat Chetthabutr	College of Asian Scholars	16
3	(Thailand) Rinyaphat Moondong	Khelang United (1), Chonburi (13)	14
4	(Thailand) Thawanrat Promthongmee	Chonburi	12
5	(Thailand) Ploychompoo Somnuek	Bangkok	11
5	(Thailand) Pattaranan Aupachai	Chonburi	11
5	(Thailand) Orapin Waenngoen	College of Asian Scholars	11

=== Hat-tricks ===
Player	For	Against	Result	Date
(Thailand) Kurisara Limpawanich	College of Asian Scholars	Khelang United	11–2 (H)	9 February 2025
(Thailand) Orapin Waenngoen	College of Asian Scholars	Khelang United	11–2 (H)	9 February 2025
(Thailand) Pattaranan Aupachai	Chonburi	Khelang United	9–1 (H)	2 March 2025
(Thailand) Kurisara Limpawanich	College of Asian Scholars	Chonburi Sports School	8–0 (H)	5 March 2025
(Thailand) Wirunya Kwaenkasikarm	Chonburi	Chonburi Sports School	5–1 (A)	9 March 2025
(Thailand) Kanyanat Chetthabutr^{6}	College of Asian Scholars	Surin Hinkhon United	10–0 (A)	27 April 2025
(Thailand) Kanyanat Chetthabutr^{4}	College of Asian Scholars	Khelang United	9–0 (A)	30 April 2025
(Thailand) Thawanrat Promthongmee^{4}	Chonburi	Surin Hinkhon United	10–0 (H)	30 April 2025
(Thailand) Rinyaphat Moondong^{4}	Chonburi	Surin Hinkhon United	10–0 (H)	30 April 2025
(Thailand) Rinyaphat Moondong^{4}	Chonburi	Khelang United	4–0 (A)	4 May 2025
(Thailand) Parichat Thongrong	Nakhon Si Thammarat Sports School	Surin Hinkhon United	10–0 (H)	10 May 2025
(Thailand) Kanchanathat Poomsri	Kasem Bundit University	Khelang United	7–0 (H)	11 May 2025
(Thailand) Pluemjai Sontisawat	Chonburi	Chonburi Sports School	8–0 (H)	14 May 2025
(Thailand) Rinyaphat Moondong	Chonburi	Nakhon Si Thammarat Sports School	6–1 (H)	21 May 2025

Notes: ^{6} = Player scored 6 goals; ^{4} = Player scored 4 goals; (H) = Home team; (A) = Away team

=== Clean sheets ===
As of 22 May 2025.

Rank	Player	Club	Clean sheets
1	(Thailand) Thichanan Sodchuen	College of Asian Scholars	8
2	(Thailand) Chotmanee Thongmongkol	Bangkok	4
2	(Thailand) Pawarisa Homyamyen	Chonburi	4
4	(Thailand) Natacha Nguansa-ngiam	Kasem Bundit University	3
4	(Thailand) Yada Sengyong	Nakhon Si Thammarat Sports School	3
6	(Thailand) Pimlapat Aeewong	Bangkok	2
6	(Thailand) Benyapa Singsai	Chonburi Sports School	2
6	(Thailand) Nongnut Ritthakon	Nakhon Si Thammarat Sports School	2
