= Azumi Oka =

Filipino-American soccer player (born 2006)

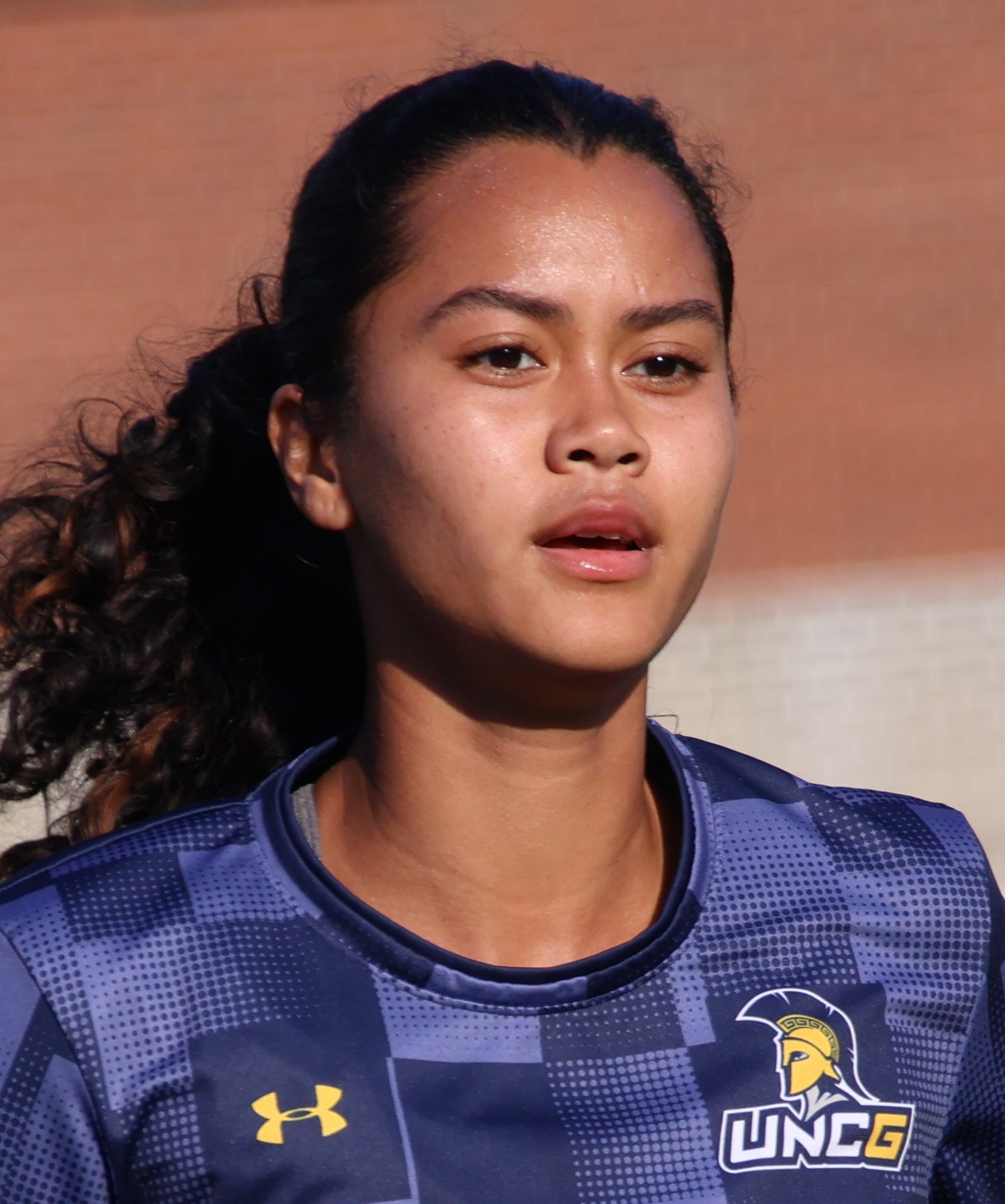
- Oka with UNC Greensboro in 2025

Personal information
- Date of birth: April 21, 2006 (age 20)
- Height: 5 ft 8 in (1.73 m)
- Position: Left back

Team information
- Current team: UNC Greensboro Spartans
- Number: 33

College career
Years	Team	Apps	(Gls)
2024–	UNC Greensboro Spartans	14	(2)

International career^{‡}
2025–	Philippines	8	(0)
Medal record
Women's football
Representing the Philippines
Southeast Asian Games
Gold medal – first place	2025 Thailand	Team
- ‡ National team caps and goals as of September 25, 2026

Azumi Oka (born April 21, 2006) is a Filipino-American college soccer player who plays as a left back for the UNC Greensboro Spartans and the Philippines national team.

== Early life ==
Oka grew up in Jacksonville, North Carolina. She was named all-state multiple times at Jacksonville High School and helped the team to their first NCHSAA 3A state title as a senior in 2024. She played ECNL club soccer for the Wilmington Hammerheads. She first committed to play college soccer for the Navy Midshipmen, over offers including UNC Greensboro, UNC Wilmington, and Xavier, but later flipped her commitment to UNC Greensboro.

== College career ==
Oka made 14 appearances and scored 2 goals for the UNC Greensboro Spartans as a freshman in 2024.

During college, Oka also played for Port City FC in the Women's Premier Soccer League, being named in the regional Best XI in 2025.

== International career ==
Oka was first called up to the Philippines national team for the 2025 ASEAN Women's Championship in August. On August 7, 2025, she made her international debut in their opening 7–0 win over Timor-Leste. She played the entirety of the squad's three matches in the competition.

== Career statistics ==
=== International ===
As of match played December 11, 2025

Appearances and goals by national team and year
National team	Year	Apps	Goals
Philippines	2025	4	0
Total		4	0

== Personal life ==
Oka's sister, Caidy Nelson, is a youth international for the Philippines.

== Honors ==
Philippines

- Southeast Asian Games: 2025
