= 2026 Thai Women's League 1 =

Thai Women's League 1
- Season: 2026
- Dates: 31 January 2026 – 28 June 2026
- Champions: College of Asian Scholars
- AFC Women's Champions League: College of Asian Scholars
- Matches: 56
- Goals: 205 (3.66 per match)
- Biggest home win: 9 goals difference College of Asian Scholars 9–0 Nakhon Sawan (4 February 2026)
- Biggest away win: 6 goals difference Chonburi Sports School 0–6 Chonburi (28 February 2026); Nakhon Sawan 0–6 Bangkok (30 May 2026)
- Highest scoring: 9 goals College of Asian Scholars 9–0 Nakhon Sawan (4 February 2026)
- Longest winning run: 8 matches College of Asian Scholars
- Longest unbeaten run: 14 matches College of Asian Scholars
- Longest winless run: 14 matches Nakhon Sawan
- Longest losing run: 9 matches Nakhon Sawan

The 2026 Thai Women's League 1 is the 12th season of the Thai Women's League 1, the top Thai professional league for women's association football clubs, since its establishment in 2009. A total of 8 teams will compete in the league. This season marks the first year of sponsorship by Wingzsport, with the competition officially titled the Wingz Thai Women's League 1.

== Teams ==
=== Number of teams by province ===
| Position | Province | Number | Teams |
|---|---|---|---|
| 1 | Bangkok | 2 | Bangkok and Kasem Bundit University |
| 2 | Chonburi | 2 | Chonburi and Chonburi Sports School |
| 3 | Buriram | 1 | Burirat Academy |
| 3 | Khon Kaen | 1 | College of Asian Scholars |
| 3 | Nakhon Sawan | 1 | Nakhon Sawan |
| 3 | Nakhon Si Thammarat | 1 | Nakhon Si Thammarat Sports School |

=== Stadiums and locations ===
Locations of the 2026 Thai Women's League 1 teams

| Team | Location | Stadium | Coordinates |
|---|---|---|---|
| Bangkok | Bangkok (Min Buri) | 72nd Anniversary Stadium, Min Buri | 13°48′08″N 100°47′28″E |
| Burirat Academy | Buriram (Mueang) | Buriram City Stadium | 14°56′45″N 103°06′12″E |
| Chonburi | Chonburi (Mueang) | Chonburi Daikin Stadium | 13°20′10″N 100°57′23″E |
| Chonburi Sports School | Chonburi (Mueang) | Chonburi Training Ground | 13°24′35″N 100°59′44″E |
| College of Asian Scholars | Khon Kaen (Phon) | Unif Park | 15°49′37″N 102°36′46″E |
| Kasem Bundit University | Bangkok (Min Buri) | Stadium of Kasem Bundit University | 13°48′06″N 100°44′06″E |
| Nakhon Sawan | Nakhon Sawan (Mueang) | Nakhon Sawan Provincial Stadium | 15°42′36″N 100°06′26″E |
| Nakhon Si Thammarat Sports School | Nakhon Si Thammarat (Thung Song) | Stadium of Nakhon Si Thammarat Sports School | 8°11′06″N 99°37′08″E |

=== Foreign players ===
A Thai Women's League 1 team could register 3 foreign players from foreign players all around the world. A team can use 3 foreign players on the field in each game.

Note :
(substituted off) : players who released during second leg transfer window;
(substituted on) : players who registered during second leg transfer window.

| AFC member countries players. |
| CAF member countries players. |
| CONCACAF member countries players. |
| CONMEBOL member countries players. |
| OFC member countries players. |
| UEFA member countries players. |
| No foreign player registered. |

| Club | Leg | Player 1 | Player 2 | Player 3 |
|---|---|---|---|---|
| Bangkok | 1st |
| Bangkok | 2nd |
| Burirat Academy | 1st |
| Burirat Academy | 2nd |
| Chonburi | 1st |
| Chonburi | 2nd |
| Chonburi Sports School | 1st |
| Chonburi Sports School | 2nd |
| College of Asian Scholars | 1st | (Japan) Saki Nishihara | (Japan) Marin Kai | (Philippines) Hali Long |
| College of Asian Scholars | 2nd | (Japan) Saki Nishihara | (Japan) Marin Kai | (Philippines) Hali Long |
| Kasem Bundit University | 1st |
| Kasem Bundit University | 2nd |
| Nakhon Sawan | 1st |
| Nakhon Sawan | 2nd |
| Nakhon Si Thammarat Sports School | 1st |
| Nakhon Si Thammarat Sports School | 2nd |

== League table ==
=== Standings ===
| Pos | Team | Pld | W | D | L | GF | GA | GD | Pts | Qualification or relegation |
|---|---|---|---|---|---|---|---|---|---|---|
| 1 | College of Asian Scholars (C, Q) | 14 | 13 | 1 | 0 | 43 | 5 | +38 | 40 | Qualification for 2026–27 AFC Women's Champions League |
| 2 | Chonburi | 14 | 11 | 0 | 3 | 41 | 14 | +27 | 33 | |
| 3 | Bangkok | 14 | 7 | 4 | 3 | 34 | 13 | +21 | 25 | |
| 4 | Kasem Bundit University | 14 | 6 | 3 | 5 | 24 | 19 | +5 | 21 | |
| 5 | Burirat Academy | 14 | 5 | 2 | 7 | 21 | 42 | −21 | 17 | |
| 6 | Chonburi Sports School | 14 | 5 | 1 | 8 | 23 | 34 | −11 | 16 | |
| 7 | Nakhon Si Thammarat Sports School (R) | 14 | 3 | 0 | 11 | 10 | 30 | −20 | 9 | Relegation to 2027 Thai Women's League 2 |
| 8 | Nakhon Sawan (R) | 14 | 0 | 1 | 13 | 9 | 48 | −39 | 1 | Relegation to 2027 Thai Women's League 2 |

Source: Thai League
Rules for classification: 1) Points; 2) Head-to-head points; 3) Head-to-head goal difference; 4) Head-to-head goal scored; 5) Overall goal difference; 6) Overall goal scored; 7) Fair play points; 8) Play-off without extra time).
(C) Champions; (Q) Qualified for the phase indicated; (R) Relegated

=== Positions by round ===
| Team ╲ Round | 1 | 2 | 3 | 4 | 5 | 6 | 7 | 8 | 9 | 10 | 11 | 12 | 13 | 14 |
|---|---|---|---|---|---|---|---|---|---|---|---|---|---|---|
| College of Asian Scholars | 1 | 1 | 1 | 1 | 1 | 2 | 1 | 1 | 1 | 1 | 1 | 1 | 1 | 1 |
| Chonburi | 2 | 2 | 2 | 2 | 2 | 1 | 2 | 2 | 2 | 2 | 2 | 2 | 2 | 2 |
| Bangkok | 4 | 4 | 5 | 3 | 3 | 3 | 3 | 3 | 3 | 3 | 3 | 3 | 3 | 3 |
| Kasem Bundit University | 3 | 3 | 3 | 4 | 4 | 6 | 4 | 4 | 4 | 4 | 4 | 4 | 4 | 4 |
| Burirat Academy | 8 | 7 | 7 | 7 | 5 | 4 | 5 | 5 | 6 | 7 | 7 | 5 | 5 | 5 |
| Chonburi Sports School | 5 | 5 | 6 | 5 | 6 | 5 | 6 | 6 | 5 | 5 | 5 | 6 | 6 | 6 |
| Nakhon Si Thammarat Sports School | 7 | 6 | 4 | 6 | 7 | 7 | 7 | 7 | 7 | 6 | 6 | 7 | 7 | 7 |
| Nakhon Sawan | 6 | 8 | 8 | 8 | 8 | 8 | 8 | 8 | 8 | 8 | 8 | 8 | 8 | 8 |

Source: Thai League
= Leader and qualification for 2026–27 AFC Women's Champions League; = Relegation to 2027 Thai Women's League 2

=== Results by round ===
| Team ╲ Round | 1 | 2 | 3 | 4 | 5 | 6 | 7 | 8 | 9 | 10 | 11 | 12 | 13 | 14 |
|---|---|---|---|---|---|---|---|---|---|---|---|---|---|---|
| College of Asian Scholars | W | W | W | W | W | D | W | W | W | W | W | W | W | W |
| Chonburi | W | W | W | W | W | W | L | W | W | L | W | W | W | L |
| Bangkok | D | D | L | W | W | D | W | W | D | W | W | W | L | L |
| Kasem Bundit University | W | D | D | L | L | L | W | W | D | W | W | L | L | W |
| Burirat Academy | L | D | L | D | W | W | L | L | L | L | L | W | W | W |
| Chonburi Sports School | D | L | W | L | L | W | L | L | W | L | L | L | W | W |
| Nakhon Si Thammarat Sports School | L | L | W | L | L | L | W | L | L | W | L | L | L | L |
| Nakhon Sawan | L | L | L | L | D | L | L | L | L | L | L | L | L | L |

Source: Thai League
W = Won; D = Drawn; L = Lost

=== Results ===
| Home \ Away | BKK | BRA | CBR | CBS | CAS | KBU | NSW | NSS |
|---|---|---|---|---|---|---|---|---|
| Bangkok | — | 7–0 | 2–0 | 4–0 | 0–2 | 0–0 | 5–1 | 3–1 |
| Burirat Academy | 2–0 | — | 2–5 | 3–1 | 0–4 | 3–3 | 1–1 | 2–0 |
| Chonburi | 2–0 | 5–0 | — | 3–2 | 1–2 | 4–1 | 6–0 | 1–0 |
| Chonburi Sports School | 3–3 | 4–2 | 0–6 | — | 0–2 | 2–1 | 2–1 | 1–2 |
| College of Asian Scholars | 0–0 | 6–1 | 2–1 | 2–1 | — | 2–1 | 9–0 | 3–0 |
| Kasem Bundit University | 1–1 | 4–1 | 1–2 | 3–1 | 0–1 | — | 2–0 | 3–0 |
| Nakhon Sawan | 0–6 | 1–2 | 1–2 | 2–4 | 0–4 | 1–2 | — | 1–2 |
| Nakhon Si Thammarat Sports School | 1–3 | 1–2 | 1–3 | 0–2 | 0–4 | 1–2 | 1–0 | — |

Source: Thai League
Legend: Blue = home team win; Yellow = draw; Red = away team win.
For upcoming matches, an "a" indicates there is an article about the rivalry between the two participants.
