= Thailand women's national football team =

Women's national association football team representing Thailand

Thailand
- Nicknames: ชบาแก้ว (Chaba Kaew)
- Association: FA Thailand
- Confederation: AFC (Asia)
- Sub-confederation: AFF (Southeast Asia)
- Head coach: Natipong Sritong-In
- Captain: Saowalak Pengngam
- Most caps: Waraporn Boonsing (142)
- Top scorer: Pitsamai Sornsai (75)
- FIFA code: THA
First colours	Second colours	Third colours

FIFA ranking
- Current: 50 ▼1 (20 October 2026)
- Highest: 28 (July 2011, June – September 2018)
- Lowest: 53 (August – December 2025)

First international
- Thailand 3–2 Australia (Hong Kong; 25 August 1975)

Biggest win
- Malaysia 0–14 Thailand (Vientiane, Laos; 4 December 2009)

Biggest defeat
- North Korea 15–0 Thailand (Bangkok, Thailand; 12 December 1998)

World Cup
- Appearances: 2 (first in 2015)
- Best result: Group stage (2015, 2019)

Asian Cup
- Appearances: 17 (first in 1975)
- Best result: Champions (1983)

ASEAN Championship
- Appearances: 12 (first in 2006)
- Best result: Champions (2011, 2015, 2016, 2018)
Medal record
AFC Women's Asian Cup
Gold medal – first place	1983 Thailand
Silver medal – second place	1975 Hong Kong
Silver medal – second place	1981 Hong Kong
Bronze medal – third place	1986 Hong Kong
ASEAN Cup
Gold medal – first place	2011 Laos
Gold medal – first place	2015 Vietnam	Team
Gold medal – first place	2016 Myanmar	Team
Gold medal – first place	2018 Indonesia	Team
Silver medal – second place	2007 Myanmar
Silver medal – second place	2019 Thailand
Silver medal – second place	2022 Thailand	Team
Bronze medal – third place	2006 Vietnam
Bronze medal – third place	2008 Vietnam
Bronze medal – third place	2012 Vietnam

The Thailand women's national football team (Thai: ฟุตบอลหญิงทีมชาติไทย, RTGS: futbon ying thim chat thai) represents Thailand in women's association football and is run by the Football Association of Thailand. The team won the Asian Cup in 1983 and have qualified for two FIFA Women's World Cups in 2015 and 2019. Their highest ranking in the FIFA Women's World Rankings is 28th, achieved in July 2011 and June 2018.

== History ==
=== Early history and an established Southeast Asian powerhouse ===
Thailand women's football was established in the late 1960s and 1970s, but it was not until the 1975 AFC Women's Championship that the women's team had their first match. The team has become one of the most powerful football women's teams in Southeast Asia since 1985 along with Vietnam starting in 2001. Thailand cemented its position in Asia by winning gold medals at the 1983, then they cemented its position in their region by winning four AFF Women's Championships in 2011, 2015, 2016, and 2018. Also, in the SEA Games women's level, Thailand also cemented its position, winning gold five times: in 1985, 1995, 1997, 2007, and 2013 editions, during which the men's team also won gold medals.

In spite of being a major powerhouse in Southeast Asian women's football, Thailand has fallen short in continental tournaments like the AFC Women's Asian Cup and Asian Games. Thailand only won it once in 1983 and has since maintained the qualifying streak starting in 2003, and had hosted the competitions twice, first in 1983 and second in 2003, but they did not qualify for the FIFA Women's World Cup tournaments until the 2015 FIFA Women's World Cup when they won against arch-rival Vietnam 2–1 in their opponent's turf.

=== 2014 AFC Women's Asian Cup ===
Thailand qualified to the 2015 FIFA Women's World Cup by finishing the 2014 AFC Women's Asian Cup in fifth place, defeating hosts and regional rivals Vietnam.

=== 2015 FIFA Women's World Cup ===
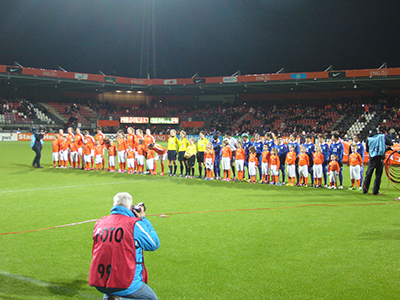
A friendly match between Thailand and the Netherlands before the 2015 FIFA Women's World Cup

In spite of less investment than the men's team, the Thai women's team made history by becoming the country's first 11-a-side football team of either gender to qualify for a FIFA tournament without hosting one. Because of this, the Football Association of Thailand announced that they will invest more in order to improve the quality of Thai women's football. Thailand were drawn into group B together with title contenders Germany and Norway, as well as the Ivory Coast. Their only win came against the Ivory Coast by a score of 3–2, with two goals from Orathai Srimanee and one goal from Thanatta Chawong, as they finished third in the group and were eliminated as one of the two worst third-placed teams.

=== 2019 FIFA Women's World Cup ===
At the 2019 FIFA Women's World Cup, Thailand were drawn into Group F, together with the United States, Sweden and Chile. Thailand's impressive showing back in the 2018 AFC Women's Asian Cup, including holding powerhouse Australia 2–2 in the semi-finals, provided the belief that Thailand was capable to compete against stronger forces in the world. Thailand, however, began their opening game with a 13–0 thumping to the US, which was the biggest ever defeat by a Thai team of either gender in an international tournament. The devastating defeat to the United States severely dented Thai spirits, as they also lost their later matches 5–1 to Sweden and 2–0 to Chile, exiting the tournament without scoring a point, became the worst performed team ever in FIFA Women's World Cup history.

=== 2023 FIFA Women's World Cup Qualifications ===
At the 2022 AFC Women's Asian Cup, Thailand were drawn into Group B, and they lost in the quarter-finals and lost to Vietnam 0–2 and Chinese Taipei 0–3. The Thai advanced to the playoff round, and they eventually lost 0–2 to Cameroon. This defeat officially knocked Thailand out of the 2023 World Cup for the first time since the 2011 edition.

== Team image ==
=== Nicknames ===
The Thailand women's national football team has been known or nicknamed as "ชบาแก้ว (Chaba Kaew)".

=== Rivalries ===
==== Vietnam ====
Thailand has a strong rivalry with Vietnam as both teams have historically been among the strongest sides in the region and have frequently competed for major regional titles, particularly at the Southeast Asian Games and the ASEAN Women's Championship. In 39 meetings between the two teams, Thailand has won 9 matches, Vietnam 20, while 10 have ended in draws.

== Results and fixtures ==
The following is a list of match results in the last 12 months, as well as any future matches that have been scheduled.

Legend

Win Draw Loss Fixture

=== 2025 ===
4 December 2025 SEA Games	Thailand	8–0	Indonesia	Chonburi, Thailand
18:30 UTC+7	Yumanda 8' (o.g.); Pattaranan 21'; Silawan 27'; Saowalak 44'; Jiraporn 50' (pen.), 52' (pen.), 59'; Panittha 55'	Report		Stadium: Chonburi Stadium; Referee: Azusa Sugino (Japan)

10 December 2025 SEA Games	Thailand	2–0	Singapore	Chonburi, Thailand
18:30 UTC+7	Kanyanat 9'; Orapin 18'	Report		Stadium: Chonburi Stadium; Referee: Rebecca Durcau (Australia)

14 December 2025 SEA Games SF	Thailand	1–1 (a.e.t.) (2–4 p)	Philippines	Chonburi, Thailand
18:30 UTC+7	Jiraporn 53'	Report	Guy 87' (pen.)	Stadium: Chonburi Stadium; Referee: Esra'a Almbaidin (Jordan)
	Penalties
	Jiraporn (penalty scored); Taneekarn (penalty scored); Pluemjai (penalty missed); Orapin (penalty missed)		(penalty scored) Guy; (penalty scored) Carpio; (penalty scored) Eggesvik; (penalty scored) Long

17 December 2025 SEA Games Bronze medal match	Thailand	2–0	Indonesia	Chonburi, Thailand
15:30 UTC+7	Pitsamai 17'; Pattaranan 43'	Report		Stadium: Chonburi Stadium; Referee: Gulshoda Saitkulova (Uzbekistan)

=== 2026 ===
12 April 2026 FIFA Series	Thailand	4–0	New Caledonia	Ratchaburi, Thailand
20:30 UTC+7	Natalie 4'; Thawanrat 28'; Janista 73'; Alisa 90+1'	Report (FIFA)		Stadium: Ratchaburi Stadium; Referee: Kim Yu-jeong (South Korea)

15 April 2026 FIFA Series	Thailand	2–0	DR Congo	Ratchaburi, Thailand
20:30 UTC+7	Mårtensson 60'; Wiranya 90+4'	Report (FIFA)		Stadium: Ratchaburi Stadium; Referee: Kim Yu-jeong (South Korea)

6 June AYA Bank Tri-Nations Cup	Uzbekistan	0–1	Thailand	Yangon, Myanmar
17:00 UTC+6:30		Report	Jiraporn 2'	Stadium: Thuwunna Stadium; Referee: Khin Nyein Chan (Myanmar)

9 June AYA Bank Tri-Nations Cup	Myanmar	1–1	Thailand	Yangon, Myanmar
17:00 UTC+6:30	May Htet Lu 50'	Report	Thawanrat 55'	Stadium: Thuwunna Stadium; Referee: Plong Pichakara (Cambodia)

14 September 2026 Asian Games GS	Japan	8–0	Thailand	Shizuoka, Japan
	Nakashima 3', 37', 41'; Kamiya 30'; Takarada 70', 74', 79'; Sakakibara 88'	Report		Stadium: Shizuoka Stadium ECOPA; Attendance: 1,202; Referee: Nurul Ain Izatty Zainal (Malaysia)

17 September 2026 Asian Games GS	Thailand	0–1	Chinese Taipei	Fukuroi, Japan
16:00 UTC+9		Report	Tanaka 78'	Stadium: Shizuoka Stadium; Attendance: 277; Referee: Rawdha Al-Mansoori (United Arab Emirates)

21 September 2026 Asian Games GS	Vietnam	0–0	Thailand	Osaka, Japan
19:30 UTC+9		Report		Stadium: Nagai Stadium; Referee: Veronika Bernatskaia (Kyrgyzstan)

20 November Friendly^{1}	Thailand	4–2	(United Kingdom) Great Britain Police	Bangkok, Thailand
18:30 UTC+7	Kanyanat 30', 45+1'; Alisa 68'; Kanjanathat 88' (pen.)	Report	Atkin 13'; Snelling 15'	Stadium: PAT Stadium; Referee: Pansa Chaisanit (Thailand)

28 November Yongchuan International Tournament	China	–	Thailand	Chongqing, China
19:35 UTC+8				Stadium: Yongchuan Sports Center

1 December Yongchuan International Tournament	Thailand	–	Malawi	Chongqing, China
15:00 UTC+8				Stadium: Yongchuan Sports Center

4 December Yongchuan International Tournament	Albania	–	Thailand	Chongqing, China
15:00 UTC+8				Stadium: Yongchuan Sports Center

- ^{1} Non FIFA 'A' international match

== Coaching staff ==
Position	Name
Technical director	Vacant
Team manager	Apaporn Sangkhashiri
Head coach	Natipong Sritong-In
Assistant coach	Chaowanee Panlert
Assistant coach	(Thailand) Nisa Romyen
Goalkeeper coach	Umarin Yaodam
Fitness coach	Pongboworn Kinawong
Kit manager	Ratchayaporn Kasiruk
Analyst	Saranpat Boeploy
Doctor	Anchisa Leewisuthikul
Physiotherapists	Mallika Phirombun
Masseur	Chanokporn Chiangnueng; Apichaya Karnaraksanukul
Team coordinator	Saranporn Naksuk
Media coordinator	Phichchaporn Suwannakut
Public relations officer	Rakkiat Phochanakit

=== Coaching history ===
- (Thailand) Charnwit Polcheewin (2001–2002, 2004)
- (Thailand) Naiya Boonprasit (2003)
- (Thailand) Chana Yodprang (2006–2009)
- (Thailand) Jatuporn Pramualban (2010, 2013–2014)
- (Thailand) Piyakul Kaewnamkang (2011–2013)
- (Thailand) Nuengrutai Srathongvian (2014–2015, 2017–2019, 2024–2025, 2025–2026)
- (England) Spencer Prior (2016–2017)
- (Thailand) Naruphol Kaenson (2019–2021, 2023–2024)
- (Japan) Miyo Okamoto (2021–2023)
- (Japan) Futoshi Ikeda (2025)
- (Thailand) Natipong Sritong-In (2026–)

== Players ==
=== Current squad ===
The following 24 players were called up for 2026 CFA International “A” Women’s Football Tournament

No.	Pos.	Player	Date of birth (age)	Caps	Goals	Club
	GK	Palita Jindasri	11 February 2003 (age 23)			(Football Association of Thailand) BGC–College of Asian Scholars
	GK	Panita Promrat	28 October 1998 (age 28)			(Football Association of Thailand) BGC–College of Asian Scholars
	GK	Natacha Nguansa-ngiam	4 March 2003 (age 23)			(Football Association of Thailand) Kasem Bundit University
	DF	Alissada Yuttakas	20 March 2008 (age 18)			(Football Association of Thailand) BGC–College of Asian Scholars
	DF	Uraiporn Yongkul	17 August 1998 (age 28)			(Football Association of Thailand) BGC–College of Asian Scholars
	DF	Krittiya Munrang	5 March 2003 (age 23)			(Football Association of Thailand) BGC–College of Asian Scholars
	DF	Natcha Kaewanta	3 December 2006 (age 19)			(Football Association of Thailand) Chonburi
	DF	Supaporn Inthraprasit	18 February 2004 (age 22)			(Football Association of Thailand) Chonburi
	DF	Chatchawan Rodthong	22 June 2002 (age 24)			(Football Association of Thailand) Bangkok
	DF	Parichat Thongrong	14 May 2006 (age 20)			(Football Association of Thailand) Kasem Bundit University
	DF	Pinyaphat Klinklai	26 January 2008 (age 18)			(Football Association of Thailand) Krung Thep
	MF	Khwanjira Ngok-wong	22 December 2003 (age 22)			(Football Association of Thailand) BGC–College of Asian Scholars
	MF	Kawinthida Kikuntod	16 January 2010 (age 16)			(Football Association of Thailand) BGC–College of Asian Scholars
	MF	Pluemjai Sontisawat	20 July 2003 (age 23)			(Football Association of Thailand) Chonburi
	MF	Rinyaphat Moondong	19 June 2007 (age 19)			(Football Association of Thailand) Chonburi
	MF	Thawanrat Promthongmee	29 November 2004 (age 21)			(Football Association of Thailand) Chonburi
	FW	Taneekarn Dangda	15 December 1992 (age 33)			(Football Association of Thailand) Bangkok
	MF	Pichayatida Manowang	17 November 2006 (age 20)			(Football Association of Thailand) Bangkok
	FW	Kanyanat Chetthabutr	24 September 1999 (age 27)			(Football Association of Thailand) BGC–College of Asian Scholars
	FW	Phatcharaphorn Khuchuea	23 October 2007 (age 19)			(Football Association of Thailand) Chonburi
	FW	Wiranya Kwaenkasikarm	7 July 2005 (age 21)			(Football Association of Thailand) Chonburi
	FW	Kanjanathat Poomsri	17 January 2003 (age 23)			(Football Association of Thailand) Kasem Bundit University
	FW	Alisa Rukpinij	2 February 1995 (age 31)			(Football Association of Thailand) Bangkok
	FW	Jiraporn Mongkoldee	13 August 1998 (age 28)			(Chinese Football Association) Guangxi Pingguo

=== Recent call-ups ===
The following players have been called up to the squad in the past 12 months.

Pos.	Player	Date of birth (age)	Caps	Goals	Club	Latest call-up
GK	Chonthicha Panyarung	30 December 2008 (age 17)			(Thailand) Bangkok	2026 Asian Games
GK	Thichanan Sodchuen	1 February 2003 (age 23)			(Thailand) BGC–College of Asian Scholars	2026 Asian Games
GK	Chotmanee Thongmongkol	12 January 1999 (age 27)			(Chinese Taipei) Taichung Blue Whale	2026 Asian Games
GK	Jidapa Phara	11 April 2003 (age 23)			(Thailand) BGC–College of Asian Scholars	2026 Asian Games ^{PRE}
GK	Tiffany Sornpao	22 May 1998 (age 28)			(Portugal) Vitória	2026 FIFA Series
DF	Phornphirun Philawan	8 April 1999 (age 27)			(Thailand) BGC–College of Asian Scholars	2026 Asian Games
DF	Panitha Jiratanaphibun	27 June 2004 (age 22)			(China) Guangxi Pingguo	2026 Asian Games
DF	Sankunkan Chompooseang	6 June 2005 (age 21)			(Thailand) Kasem Bundit University	2026 FIFA Series
DF	Tamonwan Raksaphakdi	24 February 2000 (age 26)			(Thailand) BGC–College of Asian Scholars	2026 FIFA Series
DF	Janthima Kaeoduanghai	22 June 2004 (age 22)			(Thailand) Chonburi	2026 FIFA Series
DF	Matilda Mårtensson	21 September 2005 (age 21)			(Sweden) IF Elfsborg	2026 FIFA Series
DF	Kanjanaporn Saenkhun	18 July 1996 (age 30)			(Thailand) BGC–College of Asian Scholars	2025 SEA Games
DF	Sunisa Srangthaisong	6 May 1988 (age 38)			(Singapore) Aerion	2025 SEA Games
MF	Sangrawee Meekham	27 February 1997 (age 29)			(Thailand) BGC–College of Asian Scholars	2026 Asian Games
MF	Achiraya Yingsakul	13 December 2007 (age 18)			(Thailand) Bangkok	2026 Asian Games
MF	Pitsamai Sornsai (captain)	19 January 1989 (age 37)			(Chinese Taipei) Taichung Blue Whale	2026 Asian Games
MF	Nutwadee Pramnak	9 October 2000 (age 26)			(Thailand) Bangkok	2026 Asian Games ^{PRE}
MF	Orapin Waenngoen	7 October 1995 (age 31)			(Thailand) BGC–College of Asian Scholars	2026 Asian Games ^{PRE}
MF	Manita Noyvach	29 November 2004 (age 21)			(Thailand) Bangkok	2026 Asian Games ^{PRE}
MF	Prichakorn Kruechuenchom	4 December 2008 (age 17)			(Thailand) Chonburi Sports School	2026 AYA Bank Tri-Nations Cup
MF	Piyathida Latham	7 June 2000 (age 26)			(Thailand) Kasem Bundit University	2026 FIFA Series
MF	Thanchanok Jansri	24 December 2004 (age 21)			(Thailand) Chonburi	2026 FIFA Series
MF	Sirikan Phayaknet	11 June 1998 (age 28)			(Thailand) Krung Thep	2026 FIFA Series
MF	Pikul Khueanpet	20 September 1988 (age 38)			(Thailand) BGC–College of Asian Scholars	2025 SEA Games
MF	Silawan Intamee	22 January 1994 (age 32)			(Thailand) Bangkok	2025 SEA Games
MF	Rhianne Rush	9 January 2003 (age 23)			(England) West Bromwich Albion	2025 SEA Games
FW	Saowalak Pengngam	30 November 1996 (age 29)			(Chinese Taipei) Taichung Blue Whale	2026 Asian Games
FW	Janista Jinantuya	9 September 2003 (age 23)			(Thailand) Bangkok	2026 Asian Games
FW	Natalie Ngosuwan	18 July 2002 (age 24)			(Australia) Preston Lions	2026 AYA Bank Tri-Nations Cup
FW	Pattaranan Aupachai	9 July 2002 (age 24)			(China) Zhanjiang Yuezhan	2026 AYA Bank Tri-Nations Cup
FW	Madison Casteen	24 October 2007 (age 19)			(United States) North Carolina Courage	2025 SEA Games
^{INJ} Withdrew from the squad due to injury^{PRE} Included in the Preliminary squad or on standby^{RET} Retired from the national team^{SUS} Serving suspension from the national team^{WD} Withdrew from the squad due to non-injury issue

== Honours ==
=== Major competitions ===
- AFC Women's Asian Cup

Champions: 1983
Runners-up: 1975, 1977, 1981
Third Place: 1986
Fourth Place: 2018

=== Regional ===
- ASEAN Women's Championship

Winners (4): 2011, 2015, 2016, 2018
(silver) Runners-up (3): 2007, 2019, 2022
(bronze) Third place (3): 2006, 2008, 2012
Fourth place (1): 2025

- SEA Games

(gold) Gold Medal (5) 1985, 1995, 1997, 2007, 2013
(silver) Silver Medal (5): 2001, 2009, 2017, 2019, 2021
(bronze) Bronze Medal (4): 2003, 2005, 2023, 2025

=== Friendly ===
- FIFA Series (women's matches)

Champions: 2026

- AYA Bank Tri-Nations Cup

Champions: 2026

- Four Nations Women's Football Tournament

Runners-up: 2017, 2018

- Yongchuan International Tournament

Runners-up: 2025

== Competitive record ==
Denotes draws including knockout matches decided on penalty kicks.

Champions Runners-up Third place Fourth place

=== FIFA Women's World Cup ===
FIFA Women's World Cup record
Year	Host country	Result	Position	GP	W	D*	L	GS	GA	Coach
1991	China	Did not qualify								
1995	Sweden	Did not enter								
1999	United States	Did not enter								
2003	United States	Did not qualify								
2007	China	Did not qualify								
2011	Germany	Did not qualify								
2015	Canada	Group stage	17th	3	1	0	2	3	10	Nuengrutai Srathongvian
2019	France	Group stage	24th	3	0	0	3	1	20	Nuengrutai Srathongvian
2023	Australia; New Zealand	Did not qualify								
2027	Brazil	Did not qualify								
2031	Costa Rica; Jamaica; Mexico; United States	To be determined								
2035	United Kingdom	To be determined								
Total		Group stage	17th	6	1	0	5	4	30	

FIFA Women's World Cup history
Season	Round	Opponent	Score	Result	Venue
2015	Group stage	Norway	0–4	Loss	Ottawa, Canada
2015	Group stage	Ivory Coast	3–2	Win	Ottawa, Canada
2015	Group stage	Germany	0–4	Loss	Winnipeg, Canada
2019	Group stage	United States	0–13	Loss	Reims, France
2019	Group stage	Sweden	1–5	Loss	Nice, France
2019	Group stage	Chile	0–2	Loss	Rennes, France

FIFA Women's World Cup history
First Match	Norway 4–0 Thailand (7 June 2015; Ottawa, Canada)
Last Match	Thailand 0–2 Chile (20 June 2019; Rennes, France)
Biggest Win	Ivory Coast 2–3 Thailand (11 June 2015; Ottawa, Canada)
Biggest Defeat	United States 13–0 Thailand (11 June 2019; Reims, France)
Best Result	Group Stage at the 2015, 2019
Worst Result	–

=== Olympic Games ===
Summer Olympics record
Year	Host country	Result	Position	GP	W	D*	L	GS	GA
1996	United States	Did not qualify							
2000	Australia	Did not qualify							
2004	Greece	Did not qualify							
2008	China	Did not qualify							
2012	Great Britain	Did not qualify							
2016	Brazil	Did not qualify							
2020	Japan	Did not qualify							
2024	France	Did not qualify							
2028	United States	Did not qualify							
Total				-	-	-	-	-	-

=== AFC Women's Asian Cup ===
AFC Women's Asian Cup											Qualifications							
Year	Host	Round	Result	M	W	D	L	GF	GA	GD	M	W	D	L	GF	GA	GD	Link
1975	Hong Kong	Runners-up	2nd	4	3	0	1	10	5	+5	No Qualification							
1977	Republic of China	Runners-up	2nd	4	3	0	1	9	2	+7	No Qualification							
1980	India	Did not enter									No Qualification							
1981	Hong Kong	Runners-up	2nd	5	3	0	2	6	8	-2	No Qualification							
1983	Thailand	Champions	1st	6	6	0	0	25	1	+24	No Qualification							
1986	Hong Kong	Third place	3rd	5	4	0	1	15	5	+10	No Qualification							
1989	Hong Kong	Group stage	7th	3	0	0	3	1	12	-11	No Qualification							
1991	Japan	Group stage	5th	3	1	1	1	4	10	-6	No Qualification							
1993	Malaysia	Did not enter									No Qualification							
1995	Malaysia	Group stage	5th	2	1	0	1	3	4	-1	No Qualification							
1997	China	Did not enter									No Qualification							
1999	Philippines	Group stage	8th	4	2	0	2	6	10	-4	No Qualification							
2001	Chinese Taipei	Group stage	8th	4	2	0	2	5	9	-4	No Qualification							
2003	Thailand	Group stage	8th	4	2	0	2	6	21	-15	No Qualification							
2006	Australia	Group stage	7th	4	1	0	3	2	26	-24	3	3	0	0	12	3	+9	Link
2008	Vietnam	Group stage	7th	3	0	0	3	1	11	-10	3	2	0	1	20	4	+16	Link
2010	China	Group stage	6th	3	1	0	2	2	7	-5	2	2	0	0	14	2	+12	Link
2014	Vietnam	Fifth place	5th	3	1	0	2	2	7	-5	3	3	0	0	15	1	+14	Link
2018	Jordan	Fourth place	4th	5	2	1	2	12	11	+1	2	2	0	0	7	0	+7	Link
2022	India	Quarter-finals	8th	6	1	0	5	5	15	-10	2	2	0	0	11	0	+11	Link
2026	Australia	Did not qualify									4	3	0	1	23	2	+21	Link
Total		Champions	1st	68	33	2	33	114	164	-50	19	17	0	2	102	12	+90	Link

AFC Women's Asian Cup history
First Match	Thailand 3–2 Australia (25 August 1975; Hong Kong)
Biggest Win	Thailand 8–0 Malaysia (10 April 1983; Bangkok, Thailand)
Biggest Defeat	North Korea 14–0 Thailand (12 June 2003; Bangkok, Thailand)
Best Result	Champions at the 1983
Worst Result	Group stage at the 9 editions

=== Asian Games ===
Asian Games record
Year	Host country	Result	Position	GP	W	D*	L	GS	GA
1990	China	Did not enter							
1994	Japan	Did not enter							
1998	Thailand	Group stage	7th	3	0	1	2	1	22
2002	South Korea	Did not enter							
2006	Qatar	Group stage	6th	3	1	0	2	5	11
2010	China	Group stage	6th	2	0	0	2	0	6
2014	South Korea	Quarter-finals	6th	4	2	0	2	21	7
2018	Indonesia	Quarter-finals	7th	3	0	0	3	2	10
2022	China	Quarter-finals	8th	3	1	0	2	1	5
2026	Japan	Group stage	9th	3	0	1	2	0	9
Total		Quarter-finals	6th	21	4	2	15	30	70

Asian Games History
Season	Round	Opponent	Score	Result	Venue
(Thailand) 1998	Group Stage	Japan	0–6	Loss	Pathum Thani, Thailand
(Thailand) 1998	Group Stage	Vietnam	1–1	Draw	Pathum Thani, Thailand
(Thailand) 1998	Group Stage	North Korea	0–15	Loss	Bangkok, Thailand
(Qatar) 2006	Group Stage	China	0–7	Loss	Doha, Qatar
(Qatar) 2006	Group Stage	Japan	0–4	Loss	Al-Rayyan, Qatar
(Qatar) 2006	Group Stage	Jordan	5–0	Win	Doha, Qatar
(China) 2010	Group Stage	Japan	0–4	Loss	Guangzhou, China
(China) 2010	Group Stage	North Korea	0–2	Loss	Guangzhou, China
(South Korea) 2014	Group Stage	South Korea	0–5	Loss	Incheon, South Korea
(South Korea) 2014	Group Stage	Maldives	10–0	Win	Incheon, South Korea
(South Korea) 2014	Group Stage	India	10–0	Win	Incheon, South Korea
(South Korea) 2014	Quarter-finals	Vietnam	1–2	Loss	Goyang, South Korea
(Indonesia) 2018	Group Stage	Japan	0–2	Loss	Palembang, Indonesia
(Indonesia) 2018	Group Stage	Vietnam	2–3	Loss	Palembang, Indonesia
(Indonesia) 2018	Quarter-finals	China	0–5	Loss	Palembang, Indonesia
(China) 2022	Group Stage	India	1–0	Win	Wenzhou, China
(China) 2022	Group Stage	Chinese Taipei	0–1	Loss	Wenzhou, China
(China) 2022	Quarter-finals	China	0–4	Loss	Hangzhou, China
(Japan) 2026	Group Stage	Japan	0–8	Loss	Fukuroi, Japan
(Japan) 2026	Group Stage	Chinese Taipei	0–1	Loss	Fukuroi, Japan
(Japan) 2026	Group Stage	Vietnam	0–0	Draw	Osaka, Japan

Asian Games history
First Match	Thailand 0–6 Japan (8 December 1998; Pathum Thani, Thailand)
Biggest Win	Thailand 10–0 Maldives (17 September 2014; Incheon, South Korea); Thailand 10–0 India (21 September 2014; Incheon, South Korea)
Biggest Defeat	North Korea 15–0 Thailand (12 December 1998; Bangkok, Thailand)
Best Result	Quarter Finals at the 2014, 2018, 2022
Worst Result	Group stage at the 1998, 2006, 2010, 2026

=== AFF Women's Championship/ASEAN Women's Championship ===
ASEAN Women's Championship record
Year	Round	Position	Pld	W	D*	L	GS	GA
(Vietnam) 2004	Did not enter							
(Vietnam) 2006	Third place	3rd	3	1	1	1	6	6
(Myanmar) 2007	Runners-up	2nd	5	3	1	1	25	3
(Vietnam) 2008	Third place	3rd	5	3	0	2	22	4
(Laos) 2011	Champions	1st	5	5	0	0	22	4
(Vietnam) 2012	Third place	3rd	4	3	0	1	21	2
(Myanmar) 2013	Group stage	5th	4	2	1	1	12	3
(Vietnam) 2015	Champions	1st	5	4	0	1	27	7
(Myanmar) 2016	Champions	1st	5	3	1	1	15	4
(Indonesia) 2018	Champions	1st	6	6	0	0	37	5
(Thailand) 2019	Runners-up	2nd	6	5	0	1	31	4
(Philippines) 2022	Runners-up	2nd	7	5	1	1	16	5
(Vietnam) 2025	Fourth place	4th	5	2	0	3	16	6
Total	Champions	1st	60	42	5	13	250	53

AFF Women's Championship history
First Match	Thailand 3–2 Myanmar (29 May 2006; Ho Chi Minh City, Vietnam)
Biggest Win	Laos 1–14 Thailand (22 September 2012; Ho Chi Minh City, Vietnam)
Biggest Defeat	Thailand 0–3 Australia U20 (1 May 2015; Ho Chi Minh City, Vietnam); Thailand 0–3 Philippines (17 July 2022; Manila, Philippines)
Best Result	Champions at the 2011, 2015, 2016, 2018
Worst Result	Group stage at the 2013

=== SEA Games ===
SEA Games record
Year	Round	Position	Pld	W	D*	L	GS	GA	GD
(Thailand) 1985	Gold medal	1st	2	2	0	0	10	0	+10
(Thailand) 1995	Gold medal	1st	5	4	1	0	16	3	+13
(Indonesia) 1997	Gold medal	1st	4	4	0	0	11	3	+8
(Malaysia) 2001	Silver medal	2nd	5	3	1	1	9	6	+3
(Vietnam) 2003	Bronze medal	3rd	4	2	0	2	11	8	+3
(Philippines) 2005	Bronze medal	3rd	4	2	0	2	4	4	0
(Thailand) 2007	Gold medal	1st	4	3	1	0	18	2	+16
(Laos) 2009	Silver medal	2nd	5	2	3	0	22	5	+17
(Myanmar) 2013	Gold medal	1st	4	3	1	0	15	4	+11
(Malaysia) 2017	Silver medal	2nd	4	3	1	0	13	4	+9
(Philippines) 2019	Silver medal	2nd	4	2	1	1	7	3	+4
(Vietnam) 2021	Silver medal	2nd	5	3	1	1	12	2	+10
(Cambodia) 2023	Bronze medal	3rd	5	4	0	1	21	4	+17
(Thailand) 2025	Bronze medal	3rd	4	3	1	0	13	1	+12
Total	14/14	1st	59	40	11	8	182	49	+133

Southeast Asian Games history
First Match	Thailand 4–0 Philippines (9 December 1985; Bangkok, Thailand)
Biggest Win	Malaysia 0–14 Thailand (4 December 2009; Vientiane, Laos)
Biggest Defeat	Vietnam 4–0 Thailand (14 September 2001; Kuala Lumpur, Malaysia)
Best Result	Gold medal at the 1985, 1995, 1997, 2007, 2013
Worst Result	Bronze medal at the 2003, 2005, 2023, 2025

=== Other tournaments ===
==== Cyprus Women's Cup ====
Cyprus Women's Cup record
Year	Result	GP	W	D	L	GS	GA	GD
2019	8th place	4	1	0	3	6	9	−3
2020	Withdrew							
Total	1/14	4	1	0	3	6	9	−3

==== Four Nations Women's Football Tournament ====
(China) Four Nations Women's Football Tournament record
Year	Result	GP	W	D	L	GS	GA	GD
2017	Runners-up	3	2	0	1	4	2	+2
2018	Runners-up	3	1	1	1	4	3	+1
Total	2/18	6	3	1	2	8	5	+3

==== Yongchuan International Tournament ====
(China) Yongchuan International Tournament record
Year	Result	GP	W	D	L	GS	GA	GD
2018	Fourth place	3	0	0	3	2	9	−7
2025	Runners-up	2	1	0	1	4	7	−3
2026	To be determined							
Total	2/7	5	1	0	4	6	16	−10

== See also ==
- Sport in Thailand
  - Football in Thailand
    - Women's football in Thailand
- Thailand women's national under-20 football team
- Thailand women's national under-17 football team
- Thailand women's national futsal team
- Thailand men's national football team

Sporting positions
Preceded by 1981 Chinese Taipei	AFC Women's Champions; 1983 (First title)	Succeeded by 1986 China
