= Janista Jinantuya =

Thai women football player

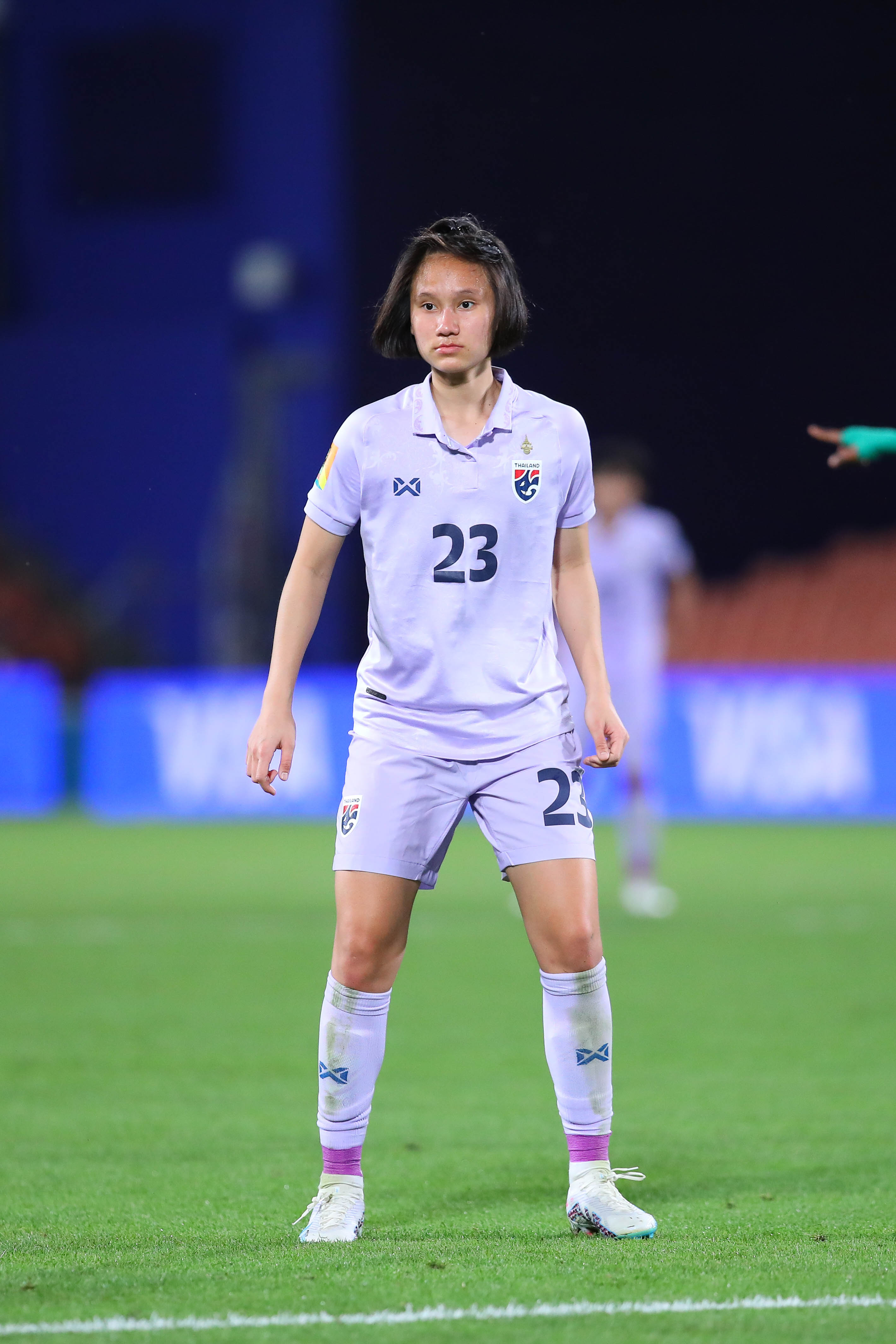
- Jinantuya in 2023

Personal information
- Date of birth: 9 September 2003 (age 23)
- Place of birth: Bangkok, Thailand
- Height: 1.68 m (5 ft 6 in)
- Position: Forward

Senior career*
| Years | Team | Apps | (Gls) |
| 2016–2022 | Chonburi | | |
| 2022–2023 | ASJ Soyaux | 7 | (0) |
| 2023–2024 | Mynavi Sendai | 1 | (0) |
| 2024–2026 | Bangkok | | |
| 2026– | Royal Thimphu College | 2 | (3) |

International career
| 2023– | Thailand | 7 | (3) |
- * Club domestic league appearances and goals as of 7 August 2026

Janista Jinantuya (Thai: จณิสตา จินันทุยา; born 9 September 2003) is a Thai professional footballer who plays as attacking midfielder and forward for Bhutan Women's National League club Royal Thimphu College and the Thailand national team.

== Club career ==
Janista is the first native Southeast Asian women's football player to play in a Europe "Big Five"league.

In July 2026, Janista has joined the Bhutanese club Royal Thimphu College and making her the second ever Thai women's footballer to signed for the Bhutanese club, after signing Pichayatida Manowang for Thimphu City FC.

== International career ==
On 25 September 2021, she made her debut for Thailand against Palestine in 2022 AFC Women's Asian Cup qualification, she scored a brace for her team to win 7–0, to grab a ticket to 2022 AFC Women's Asian Cup in India.

== Career statistics ==
=== International goals ===
| No. | Date | Venue | Opponent | Score | Result | Competition |
|---|---|---|---|---|---|---|
| 1. | 25 September 2021 | Faisal Al-Husseini International Stadium, Al-Ram, Palestine | Palestine | 1–0 | 7–0 | 2022 AFC Women's Asian Cup qualification |
| 2. | 25 September 2021 | Faisal Al-Husseini International Stadium, Al-Ram, Palestine | Palestine | 7–0 | 7–0 | 2022 AFC Women's Asian Cup qualification |
| 3. | 21 February 2023 | Waikato Stadium, Hamilton, New Zealand | Senegal | 1–0 | 1–1 | Friendly |
| 4. | 6 August 2025 | Lạch Tray Stadium, Hải Phòng, Vietnam | Indonesia | 5–0 | 7–0 | 2025 ASEAN Women's Championship |
| 5. | 9 August 2025 | Lạch Tray Stadium, Hải Phòng, Vietnam | Cambodia | 2–0 | 7–0 | 2025 ASEAN Women's Championship |
| 6. | 9 August 2025 | Lạch Tray Stadium, Hải Phòng, Vietnam | Cambodia | 4–0 | 7–0 | 2025 ASEAN Women's Championship |
| 7. | 9 August 2025 | Lạch Tray Stadium, Hải Phòng, Vietnam | Cambodia | 7–0 | 7–0 | 2025 ASEAN Women's Championship |
| 8. | 12 April 2026 | Ratchaburi Stadium, Ratchaburi, Thailand | New Caledonia | 3–0 | 4–0 | 2026 FIFA Series |
