= Thai Women's League =

- Founded: 2009; 17 years ago
- Country: Thailand
- Confederation: AFC
- Number of clubs: 8
- Level on pyramid: 1
- Relegation to: Thai Women's League 2
- International cup: AFC Women's Champions League
- Current champions: College of Asian Scholars (8th title) (2026)
- Most championships: College of Asian Scholars (8 titles)
- Current: 2026 Thai Women's League 1; 2026 Thai Women's League 2

The Thai Women's League (TWL) (Thai: ฟุตบอลลีกหญิง) is a semi-professional league contested by 10 association football clubs. At the top of the Thai football league system, it is the country's primary women's football competition—followed by the Thai Women's League 2.

Since 2009, it has been sponsored by Muang Thai Life Assurance, a life assurance company based in Bangkok, and are thus billed as Muang Thai Women's League.

== History ==
There was no women's league from 2013 to 2016, so most women played for University sports teams. National women's team coach Spencer Prior and others voted for a new league to strengthen the national team.

== Past champions ==
=== Thai Women's League ===
Season	Champion	Runner-up	Ref.
2008–09	RBAC	Bundit Asia	
2010	RBAC	BG Bundit Asia	
2011	BG Bundit Asia	RBAC	
2013	BG Bundit Asia	Bangkok	
2017	Chonburi	BG Bundit Asia	
2019	Chonburi and BG Bundit Asia	–	
2020–21	BG Bundit Asia	Chonburi	
2022	BG Bundit Asia	MH Nakhonsi	
2023	Bangkok	Chonburi	
2024	BG Bundit Asia	Bangkok	
2025	BG Bundit Asia	Chonburi	
2026	BG Bundit Asia	Chonburi	

=== Thai Women's League 2 ===
Season	Champion	Runner-up	Ref.
2010	Khon Kaen	Surat Thani	
2011	Bangkok	Nakornnont–Dhurakij Pundit	
2013	Buriram Rajabhat University	Nakhon Si Thamarat	
2020–21	Kasembundit University	Khonkaen City	
2022	Chonburi Sports School	Hinkon United	
2023	B.S.L. WFC	MH Nakhonsi City	
2024	Nakhon Si Thammarat Sports School	Langsuan City	
2025	Nakhon Sawan	Burirat Academy	
2026	Khelang United	PTU Tha Khlong	

== Teams ==
=== 2008–09 ===
Team	City
Thai Women's Premier League
Air Force	Pathum Thani
Angthong	Ang Thong
Bangkok Thonburi University	Bangkok
Bundit Asia College	Khon Kaen
Chonburi–Sripatum	Chonburi
Nakhon Ratchasima–RBAC	Bangkok
Nakhon Sawan	Nakhon Sawan
North Bangkok College	Bangkok
North–Chiang Mai	Chiang Mai
RMUT Suvarnabhumi Ayutthaya	Ayutthaya
Suphanburi	Suphanburi
Sisaket	Sisaket
Thai Airways–Rajabhat Phranakhon	Bangkok

=== 2010 ===
Team	City
Thai Women's Premier League
Bangkok Thonburi–S.Boonmeerit	Bangkok
Bundit Asia BG	Khon Kaen
Chonburi–Sripatum	Chonburi
Nakhon Sawan	Nakhon Sawan
North Bangkok	Bangkok
North–Chiang Mai	Chiang Mai
RBAC–Mittraphap	Bangkok
Sisaket	Sisaket
Thai Women's League Division 1
Angthong	Ang Thong
Bangkok	Bangkok
Khon Kaen	Khon Kaen
Maha Sarakham City	Maha Sarakham
Nakhon Ratchasima	Nakhon Ratchasima
Nonthaburi	Nonthaburi
RMUT Suvarnabhumi Ayutthaya	Ayutthaya
Surat Thani	Surat Thani

=== 2011 ===
Team	City
Thai Women's Premier League
Bangkok Thonburi	Bangkok
BG Bundit Asia	Khon Kaen
Chonburi–Sripatum	Chonburi
Khon Kaen Sports School	Khon Kaen
North Bangkok	Bangkok
RBAC	Bangkok
Sisaket Muang Thai	Sisaket
Surat Thani	Surat Thani
Thai Women's League Division 1
Angthong	Ang Thong
Bangkok	Bangkok
Buriram Rajabhat University	Buriram
Chonburi Sports School	Chonburi
Nakornnont–Dhurakij Pundit	Nonthaburi
Sanamchan	Nakhon Pathom
Satri Ayutthaya	Ayutthaya
Thung Song City	Nakhon Si Thammarat
Trang United	Trang

=== 2013 ===
Team	City
Thai Women's Premier League
Air Force–AOT	Pathum Thani
Bangkok	Bangkok
BG Bundit Asia	Khon Kaen
Chonburi–Sripatum	Chonburi
Dhurakij Pundit	Bangkok
Khon Kaen Sports School	Khon Kaen
North Bangkok	Bangkok
Sisaket	Sisaket
Thai Women's League Division 1
Bangkok Sports School	Bangkok
Buriram Rajabhat University	Buriram
Chonburi Sports School	Chonburi
IPE Maha Sarakham	Maha Sarakham
IPE Phetchabun	Phetchabun
Laem Chabang City	Chonburi
Nakhon Si Thammarat	Nakhon Si Thammarat
Sirinthorn–Kasemchai Farm	Bangkok

=== 2017 ===
- Bangkok
- BRU
- BG Bundit Asia
- Chonburi Sports School
- Dhurakij Pundit
- Lampang Sports School
- Nakhon Si Lady
- Sisaket Sports School
- Thailand U-16
- Thailand U-19

=== 2019 ===
- Air Force
- Bangkok
- BG Bundit Asia
- Chonburi Sports School
- Kasem Bundit University
- Lampang Sports School
- Nakhon Si Lady
- Sisaket Sports School
- Thailand U-16
- Thailand U-19
- Thammasat University

=== 2020–21 ===
Team	City
Thai Women's League 1
Air Force	Pathum Thani
Bangkok	Bangkok
BG Bundit Asia	Khon Kaen
BRU Burirat Academy	Buriram
Chonburi FA	Chonburi
Chonburi Sports School	Chonburi
Lampang Sports School	Lampang
MH Nakhonsi	Nakhon Si Thammarat
Thai Women's League 2
Bangkok Sports School	Bangkok
B.S.L. WFC	Bangkok
Hinkon United	Surin
Kasembundit	Bangkok
Khonkaen City	Khon Kaen
Lopburi City	Lopburi
Prime Bangkok	Bangkok
Rajpracha	Bangkok

=== 2023 ===
Team	City
Thai Women's League 1
Bangkok	Bangkok
Bangkok Sports School	Bangkok
BGC-College of Asian Scholars	Khon Kaen
BRU Burirat Academy	Buriram
Chonburi Sports School	Chonburi
Chonburi Women Football Club	Chonburi
Kasem Bundit University F.C.	Bangkok
Khon Kaen Sports School	Khon Kaen
MH Nakhonsi FC	Nakhon Si Thammarat
Surin Hinkhon United	Surin
Thai Women's League 2
Arma & Masuk Thawi Wattana FC	Bangkok
B.S.L. WFC	Bangkok
Lampang Sports School	Lampang
MH Nakhonsi City	Nakhon Si Thammarat
Nakhon Sawan F.C.	Nakhon Sawan
Phranakorn FC Women	Bangkok
Sisaket Sports School	Sisaket
Srinagarindra Samutsakhon School	Samut Sakhon

=== 2024 ===
Team	City
Thai Women's League 1
Bangkok	Bangkok
Bangkok Sports School	Bangkok
BGC-College of Asian Scholars	Khon Kaen
Chonburi Sports School	Chonburi
Chonburi Women Football Club	Chonburi
Kasem Bundit University F.C.	Bangkok
Khon Kaen Sports School	Khon Kaen
Surin Hinkhon United	Surin
Thai Women's League 2
BRU Burirat Academy	Buriram
Langsuan City Women FC	Chumphon
LPS Khelang United	Lampang
Mahanakhon Khon Kaen FC	Khon Kaen
Nakhonsi Sports School	Nakhon Si Thammarat
Nakhon Sawan F.C.	Nakhon Sawan
Phranakorn FC Women	Chonburi
Sisaket Women FC	Sisaket

== See also ==
- AFC Women's Club Championship
- AFC Women's Champions League
