= Jiraporn Mongkoldee =

Thai footballer (born 1998)

Personal information
- Full name: Jiraporn Mongkoldee
- Date of birth: 13 August 1998 (age 28)
- Place of birth: Udon Thani, Thailand
- Height: 1.60 m (5 ft 3 in)
- Position: Forward

Team information
- Current team: Guangxi Pingguo Beinong
- Number: 13

Senior career*
Years	Team	Apps	(Gls)
- Khon Kaen
2024	Bangkok	14	(19)
2025–	Guangxi Pingguo Beinong	24	(26)

International career^{‡}
2017	Thailand U19	3	(7)
2020–	Thailand	26	(19)
- * Club domestic league appearances and goals as of 22 October 2025 ‡ National team caps and goals as of 10 February 2020

Jiraporn Mongkoldee (Thai: จิราภรณ์ มงคลดี; born 13 August 1998) is a Thai footballer who plays as a forward for the Thailand women's national team.

== International goals ==
No.	Date	Venue	Opponent	Score	Result	Competition
1.	8 July 2022	Biñan Football Stadium, Biñan, Philippines	Singapore	3–0	3–0	2022 AFF Women's Championship
2.	1 April 2023	Chonburi Stadium, Chonburi, Thailand	Singapore	4–0	6–0	2024 AFC Women's Olympic Qualifying Tournament
3.	7 April 2023	Chonburi Stadium, Chonburi, Thailand	Mongolia	5–0	6–0	2024 AFC Women's Olympic Qualifying Tournament
4.	7 April 2023	Chonburi Stadium, Chonburi, Thailand	Mongolia	6–0	6–0	2024 AFC Women's Olympic Qualifying Tournament
5.	3 May 2023	RSN Stadium, Phnom Penh, Cambodia	Singapore	4–0	4–0	2023 Southeast Asian Games
6.	6 May 2023	RSN Stadium, Phnom Penh, Cambodia	Laos	1–0	6–0	2023 Southeast Asian Games
7.	6 May 2023	RSN Stadium, Phnom Penh, Cambodia	Laos	3–0	6–0	2023 Southeast Asian Games
8.	6 May 2023	RSN Stadium, Phnom Penh, Cambodia	Laos	6–0	6–0	2023 Southeast Asian Games
9.	9 May 2023	RSN Stadium, Phnom Penh, Cambodia	Cambodia	3–0	3–0	2023 Southeast Asian Games
10.	15 May 2023	Olympic Stadium, Phnom Penh, Cambodia	Cambodia	2–0	6–0	2023 Southeast Asian Games
11.	20 February 2025	Al Hamriya Sports Club Stadium, Al Hamriyah, United Arab Emirates	Russia	1–1	1–3	2025 Pink Ladies Cup
12.	2 June 2025	Thammasat Stadium, Pathum Thani, Thailand	Nepal	2–0	2–0	Friendly
13.	27 October 2025	Chalerm Phrakiat Bang Mod Stadium, Bangkok, Thailand	Bangladesh	2–0	5–1	Friendly
14.	27 October 2025	Chalerm Phrakiat Bang Mod Stadium, Bangkok, Thailand	Bangladesh	5–1	5–1	Friendly
15.	4 December 2025	Chonburi Stadium, Chonburi, Thailand	Indonesia	5–0	8–0	2025 Southeast Asian Games
16.	4 December 2025	Chonburi Stadium, Chonburi, Thailand	Indonesia	6–0	8–0	2025 Southeast Asian Games
17.	4 December 2025	Chonburi Stadium, Chonburi, Thailand	Indonesia	8–0	8–0	2025 Southeast Asian Games
18.	14 December 2025	Chonburi Stadium, Chonburi, Thailand	Philippines	1–0	1–1 (a.e.t.) (2–4 p)	2025 Southeast Asian Games
19.	6 June 2026	Thuwunna Stadium, Yangon, Myanmar	Uzbekistan	1–0	1–0	2026 AYA Bank Tri-Nations Cup
