= Krung Thep W.F.C. =

Krung Thep กรุงเทพ
- Full name: Krung Thep Women's Football Club
- Nicknames: The angel legs ladies (สาวแข้งเทพ)
- Founded: 2008; 18 years ago
- Ground: 72nd Anniversary Stadium, Min Buri; Bangkok, Thailand
- Capacity: 10,000
- Coordinates: 13°48′08″N 100°47′28″E
- Owner: Sports Association of Bangkok
- Head coach: Duangnapa Sritala
- League: Thai Women's League 1
- Website: Website

Krung Thep Women's Football Club (Thai: สโมสรฟุตบอลหญิงกรุงเทพ), is a Thai professional women's football club based in Minburi, Bangkok, Thailand. The club is currently playing in the Thai Women's League 1.

== History ==
In 2023, the club won the Thai Women's League 1 and earned the right to participate in the 2023 AFC Women's Club Championship. In the first match, the club was able to defeat Hualien from Chinese Taipei 2–0. In the second match, the club lost to Urawa Red Diamonds Ladies from Japan 1–6. In the last match, the club lost to Gokulam Kerala from India 3–4.

In 2026, the club renamed from Bangkok Women's Football Club to Krung Thep Women's Football Club

== Stadium and locations ==
Coordinates	Location	Stadium	Year
13°48′08″N 100°47′28″E	Minburi, Bangkok	72nd Anniversary Stadium, Min Buri	2008 – present

== Season by season record ==
Season	League									Asia	Top goalscorer	
Season	Division	P	W	D	L	F	A	Pts	Pos	Asia	Name	Goals
2023	TW1	18	17	0	1	92	11	51	1st	GS		
2024	TW1	14	11	1	2	48	6	34	2nd		(Thailand) Jiraporn Mongkoldee	19
2025	TW1	14	10	1	3	47	14	31	3rd		(Thailand) Ploychompoo Somnuek	11
2026	TW1	14	7	4	3	34	13	25	3rd		(Thailand) Janista Jinantuya	16

Champions	Runners-up	Promoted	Relegated

- P = Played
- W = Games won
- D = Games drawn
- L = Games lost
- F = Goals for
- A = Goals against
- Pts = Points
- Pos = Final position
- GS = Group Stage
- QR1 = First Qualifying Round
- QR2 = Second Qualifying Round
- R1 = Round 1
- R2 = Round 2
- R3 = Round 3
- R4 = Round 4
- R5 = Round 5
- R6 = Round 6
- QF = Quarter-finals
- SF = Semi-finals
- RU = Runners-up
- W = Winners

== Players ==
=== Current squad ===
As of 18 March 2024

Note: Flags indicate national team as defined under FIFA eligibility rules; some limited exceptions apply. Players may hold more than one non-FIFA nationality.

No.	Pos.	Nation	Player
1	GK	THA	Patchareerat Thanomwong
3	DF	THA	Thanchanok Ngamkhana
4	DF	THA	Saruda Konfay
6	DF	THA	Sakuna Senabuth
7	FW	THA	Jeena Thongpan
8	MF	THA	Pichayatida Manowang
9	MF	THA	Sirikan Phayaknet
10	DF	THA	Warunee Phetwisas
13	FW	THA	Jiraporn Mongkoldee
14	FW	THA	Natcha Kaewanta

No.	Pos.	Nation	Player
15	FW	THA	Kiranan Panthong
16	MF	THA	Ploychompoo Somnuek
18	GK	THA	Chalisa Phongoen
19	DF	THA	Panittha Jeeratanapavibul
20	FW	THA	Sarunchana Bamrungwut
21	FW	THA	Suchavadee Chompaeng
22	GK	THA	Chotmanee Thongmongkol
23	DF	THA	Kanpitcha Thongmakdee
24	FW	THA	Kallayarat Kongthong
27	MF	THA	Preawa Nudnabee
29	MF	THA	Aonpriya Pama
30	FW	THA	Darika Peanpailun
33	GK	THA	Nuengruthai Sorahong
66	FW	THA	Jenjira Bubpha
99	FW	THA	Kwandarin Ngoenchalongnopppakorn

== Honours ==
=== Domestic competitions ===
==== League ====
- Thai Women's League 1
  - Winners (1) : 2023
  - Runner-up (2) : 2013, 2024
