= BGC–College of Asian Scholars =

Thai women's association football team

College of Asian Scholars
- Full name: BGC–College of Asian Scholars
- Nicknames: The T-Rexor (เดอะทีเร็กซอร์)
- Short name: BGC Bundit Asia; BGC CAS
- Founded: 2001; 25 years ago
- Ground: Unif Park
- Owner: College of Asian Scholars
- Head Coach: Nuengrutai Srathongvian
- League: Thai Women's League
- 2026: 1st (Champions)
Home colours	Away colours

The BGC–College of Asian Scholars, also known as the BGC Bundit Asia (Thai: บีจีซี-บัณฑิตเอเซีย), is a Thai professional women's football club based in Khon Kaen. It competes in the Thai Women's League winning the championship seven times (2011, 2013, 2019, 2020–21, 2022, 2024 and 2025).

== Season by season record ==
Season	League									AFC Women's Champions League	Top goalscorer	
Season	Division	P	W	D	L	F	A	Pts	Pos	AFC Women's Champions League	Name	Goals
2022	TW1	14	14	0	0	49	1	42	1st	Winners		
2023	TW1	18	15	1	2	106	7	46	3rd			
2024	TW1	14	13	0	1	55	6	39	1st		(Thailand) Kurisara Limpawanich	14
2025	TW1	14	13	1	0	62	8	40	1st	GS	(Thailand) Kurisara Limpawanich	19
2026	TW1	14	13	1	0	43	5	40	1st			

Champions	Runners-up	Promoted	Relegated

- P = Played
- W = Games won
- D = Games drawn
- L = Games lost
- F = Goals for
- A = Goals against
- Pts = Points
- Pos = Final position
- GS = Group Stage
- QR1 = First Qualifying Round
- QR2 = Second Qualifying Round
- R1 = Round 1
- R2 = Round 2
- R3 = Round 3
- R4 = Round 4
- R5 = Round 5
- R6 = Round 6
- QF = Quarter-finals
- SF = Semi-finals
- RU = Runners-up
- W = Winners

== Continental record ==
Season	Competition	Round	Club	Home	Away	Result
2022	AFC Club Championship	East region	(Myanmar) ISPE	2–0		1st
2022	AFC Club Championship	East region	(Chinese Taipei) Taichung Blue Whale	0–0		1st
2024–25	AFC Champions League	Group B	(Philippines) Kaya–Iloilo	0–0		4th
2024–25	AFC Champions League	Group B	(Australia) Melbourne City	0–3		4th
2024–25	AFC Champions League	Group B	(Iran) Bam Khatoon	1–2		4th
2025–26	AFC Champions League	Preliminary	(Saudi Arabia) Al-Nassr	2–0		2nd
2025–26	AFC Champions League	Preliminary	(Nepal) APF	4–0		2nd
2025–26	AFC Champions League	Preliminary	(Uzbekistan) Nasaf	1–2		2nd
2026–27	AFC Champions League	Preliminary	(Timor-Leste) S'Amuser	10–0		2nd
2026–27	AFC Champions League	Preliminary	(Mongolia) Kharaatsai	15–0		2nd
2026–27	AFC Champions League	Preliminary	(North Korea) April 25	1–4		2nd

== Players ==
=== Current squad ===
As of 4 February 2026

Note: Flags indicate national team as defined under FIFA eligibility rules; some limited exceptions apply. Players may hold more than one non-FIFA nationality.

No.	Pos.	Nation	Player
1	GK	THA	Thichanan Sodchuen
2	FW	THA	Uraiporn Yongkul
3	DF	THA	Phornphirun Philawan
5	DF	PHI	Hali Long
6	MF	THA	Wanwisa Wongcharoen
7	MF	THA	Orapin Waenngoen
8	MF	THA	Kanchaliya Phimphabut
9	FW	THA	Kanyanat Chetthabutr
10	DF	JPN	Saki Nishihara
11	FW	THA	Taneekarn Dangda
12	MF	THA	Nutwadee Pramnak
13	FW	THA	Kurisara Limpawanich
14	MF	THA	Sangrawee Meekham
15	DF	THA	Tamonwan Raksaphakdi
16	MF	THA	Chanikan Maneechotesawat
17	FW	THA	Ratchaphan Kitirat

No.	Pos.	Nation	Player
18	GK	THA	Panita Phomrat
19	MF	THA	Khwanjira Ngok-wong
22	GK	THA	Jidapa Phara
24	MF	JPN	Marin Kai
25	MF	THA	Sasithon Dima
26	MF	THA	Ratchada Srivirach
27	MF	THA	Saranya Lamee
28	MF	THA	Sunisa Suksri
29	FW	THA	Krittiya Munrang
31	FW	THA	Anupha Noinueai
32	DF	THA	Thirada Trikun
33	MF	THA	Kawinthida Kikuntod
40	GK	THA	Palita Jindasri
43	MF	THA	Chayada Sawangarom
45	MF	THA	Thitichayan Cherdchu
48	MF	THA	Thanyarat Naovaratpong

== Honours ==
=== Domestic competitions ===
==== League ====
- Thai Women's League 1
  - Winners (8) : 2011, 2013, 2019, 2020–21, 2022, 2024, 2025, 2026

=== International competitions ===
==== AFC ====
- AFC Women's Club Championship - East region
  - Champions (1): 2022

== Coaching staff ==
Position	Name
Head coach	(Thailand) Nuengrutai Srathongvian
Assistant coach	
Goalkeeper coach	
Fitness coach	
Match analyst	
Doctor	
Physiotherapist	
Sports scientist	
Masseur	
Team manager	
Kit manager	
