= 2026–27 Myanmar Women's League =

Myanmar Women League
- Season: 2026–27
- Dates: 15 June 2026 - 31 January 2027
- Matches: 55
- Goals: 208 (3.78 per match)
- Top goalscorer: Lin Myint Mo (14 goals)
- Best goalkeeper: Ei Sandar Zaw (7 matches)
- Biggest home win: Young Lionesses 9-0 Yangon City (29 June 2026)
- Biggest away win: Young Lionesses 0-10 ISPE WFC (10 August 2026)
- Highest scoring: Zwekapin United 2-9 Thitsar Arman (3 August 2026)
- Longest winning run: ISPE WFC (5 matches)
- Longest unbeaten run: ISPE WFC (9 matches)
- Longest winless run: Yangon City (9 matches)
- Longest losing run: Yangon City (9 matches)

The 2026–27 Myanmar Women's League is the 8th season of the Myanmar Women's League, the top Myanmar professional league for women's association football clubs, since its establishment in 2016. First half will play from 15 June 2026 to 10 August 2026 and the second half will start from 19 October 2026 to 31 January 2027. The mid-season player transfer window period starts from 11 August 2026 to 16 October 2026.

Ayeyawady entered the season as the defending champions. Ayeyawady's 18-match unbeaten record came to an end after a 1–2 home defeat to ISPE WFC on 30 June 2026.

== Teams ==
Ten teams will compete in the league – the eight teams from the previous season, the returning Zwekapin United, and newly formed Yadanarbon.

Zwekapin United return to the Myanmar Women League after an absence of four season, while Yadanarbon will make their debut in the competition following the establishment of a women's team ahead of the 2026–27 season. The remaining eight teams from the previous season retained their places in the league.

The participating clubs are Ayeyawady, ISPE WFC, Myawady, Shan United, Yangon City, Thitsar Arman, Young Lionesses, Yangon United, Zwekapin United and Yadanarbon.

== Season overview ==
=== Half-season ===
After the first half of the season, ISPE WFC became the half-season champions. ISPE WFC defeated Ayeyawady away in Week 3, ending Ayeyawady's unbeaten record since 2025. Yangon City did not win a single match and lost every game. Ayeyawady are still putting pressure on ISPE WFC. The rising star Nant Shin Thant Phyu Sin Pyone scored five goals in a single match. Myat Noe Khin and Lin Myint Mo are leading the top-scorer list. Bangladesh's iconic player Ritu Porna Chakma and Ayeyawady's engine, Phyu Phyu Win, are leading the top-assist list. Zue Latt Nadi and Ei Sandar Zaw got 6 clean sheets in first-half. Four MWL clubs used foreign players during the first half of the season. ISPE WFC is the only club that remains unbeaten in the 2026–27 Myanmar Women's League.

== Stadium ==
Myanmar Women League will hold five stadiums which are Thuwunna Stadium, Padonmar Stadium, Yangon United Sports Complex, Taunggyi Stadium and Koe Thein Stadium. YUSC stadium is the home stadium of Yangon United, Taunggyi stadium is the home stadium of Shan United and Koe Thein (Pathein) is the home of Ayeyawady.

== Managerial changes ==
Team	Outgoing manager	Manner	Date of vacancy	Replaced by	Date of appointment
Myawady	(Myanmar) Htet Aung	Cancel contract	17 June 2026	(Myanmar) Yan Naing Tun	18 June 2026
Ayeyawady	(Myanmar) Aung Kyaw Zan	Sacked	17 July 2026	(Japan) Kumiko Tashiro	17 July 2026
Shan United	(Myanmar) Khin Maung Htwe	Sacked	26 October 2026	(Myanmar) U Kyaw Min	28 October 2026

== Foreign players ==
Each team can register an unlimited number of foreign players. However, only three foreign players and one AFC player are allowed in the line-up for each match.

- Players named in **bold** indicates the player was registered during the mid-season transfer window.
- Former players named in italics are players that were out of squad or left the club within the season, after the pre-season transfer window, or in the mid-season transfer window, and at least had one appearance.

Note: Flags indicate national team as has been defined under FIFA eligibility rules. Players may hold more than one non-FIFA nationality.

Team	Player 1	Player 2	Player 3	Player 4	Player 5	Player 6	Player 7	Player 8	Asia player	Former player
Ayeyawady	(United States) McKenna Davidson	(Japan) Kana Ueda	(Japan) Hanako Fujii	(Japan) Hinari Miyamoto						(Thailand) Nachanok Kosonsaksakul , (Bangladesh) Ritu Porna Chakma, (Philippines) Alyssa Ube, (Japan) Kurumi Iwashita
Yadanarbon	(Japan) Arisa Takeda	(Kenya) Maurine Achieng	(Ghana) Ruth Gyamfi							(Philippines) Maria Layacan, (Philippines) Pauline Buenaventura, (Philippines) Bianca Ellaine Sy
Shan United	(Ghana) Darko Teresah	(Burundi) Peace Olga	(Japan) Kirara Ogawa	(Philippines) Yanzie Yalong						(Ghana) Abigail Sakyiwaa
Yangon City	(Philippines) Alyssa Ube	(Philippines) Angelica Teves								
Zwekapin United	(Ghana) Gloria Fosuah	(Ghana) Rouguiatou Drame	(Ghana) Belinda Ofori							

Notes

1. THA: Failed to register due to under-18 player
2. AWCL: This player is only play for AWCL, not registered for Myanmar Women League

== Personnel and sponsorship ==
Note: Flags indicate national team as has been defined under FIFA eligibility rules. Players may hold more than one non-FIFA nationality.

Team	Manager	Captain	Kit manufacturer	Kit sponsor	
Team	Manager	Captain	Kit manufacturer	Domestic	Other sponsor(s)
Ayeyawady	(Japan) Kumiko Tashiro	(Myanmar) Lae Lae Hlaing	(Myanmar) Glory Sport	(China) Guotai Auto	List: Sleeves:GYCT; Sleeves: Oppo Myanmar
ISPE	(Myanmar) Daw San San Thein	(Myanmar) Khin Marlar Tun	(Myanmar) M21		
Myawady	(Myanmar) U Zin Htoo	(Myanmar) Aye Aye Moe	(Myanmar) Rhino		
Shan United	(Myanmar) U Kyaw Min	(Myanmar) Nang Phyu Phyu Thwe	(Myanmar) M21	(Myanmar) Alpine	
Thitsar Arman	(Myanmar) U Moe Kyaw Htwe	(Myanmar) May Thet Mon Myint	(Myanmar) AWM	(Myanmar) AWM	
Yadanarbon	(Myanmar) Bo Bo Aung	(Myanmar) Win Theingi Tun	(Myanmar) M21	(China) Jisulife	List: Front: Anycall Mobile; Front: Paw Min & Brother Group; Front: Solar Power; Back: Remax; Back: Salad by Ah Yee Taung; Back: SiMLUX; Back: Soe Soe Mont T
Yangon United	(Myanmar) U Than Wai	(Myanmar) Swe Mar Aung	(Myanmar) Glory Sport	(Myanmar) FNI	
Yangon City	(Myanmar) U Ye Wint Thu	(Myanmar) Khin Bhone	(Thailand) Ego Sport	(Myanmar) Shan Pae Poke	
Young Lionesses	(Japan) Uki Tetsuro	(Myanmar) Yee Yee Phyo	(Myanmar) M21		
Zwekapin United	(Myanmar) U Kyaw Thu Oo	(Myanmar) Kyi Yadanar Thein	(Thailand) FBT	(Myanmar) Zwekapin	

== League table ==
Pos	Team	Pld	W	D	L	GF	GA	GD	Pts	Qualification
1	ISPE	11	10	1	0	43	2	+41	31	Qualification to 2027–28 AFC Women's Champions League
2	Ayeyawady	11	8	2	1	34	4	+30	26	
3	Thitsar Arman	11	7	1	3	28	10	+18	22	
4	Yangon United	11	7	1	3	21	14	+7	22	
5	Shan United	11	6	2	3	22	14	+8	20	
6	Yadanarbon	11	4	3	4	21	13	+8	15	
7	Myawady	11	3	0	8	9	19	−10	9	
8	Young Lionesses	11	2	1	8	16	39	−23	7	
9	Zwekapin United	11	2	1	8	14	43	−29	7	
10	Yangon City	11	0	0	11	0	50	−50	0	

Updated to match(es) played on 27 October 2026. Source:
- (C) = Champions

== Results ==
Home \ Away	AYW	ISP	MWD	SHU	TSA	YDB	YGU	YGC	YLF	ZKU
Ayeyawady	—	1–2	2–1	3–0		0–0			3–0	11–0
ISPE		—	3–0			0–0	2–0	8–0		
Myawady			—	0–2	0–3	1–3	1–2			1–0
Shan United		1–4		—			0–0		4–0	3–1
Thitsar Arman	0–4	0–1	2–0	1–1	—			4–0	4–0	
Yadanarbon	1–1		0–1	1–2	0–3	—				7–1
Yangon United	0–1	0–6		3–0	2–1	3–1	—	4–0	4–2	
Yangon City	0–3	0–4	0–3	0–5	0–1	0–6		—		0–3
Young Lionesses		0–10	2–1	1–4		1–2		9–0	—	0–6
Zwekapin United	0–5	0–3			2–9		0–3		1–1	—

Updated to match(es) played on 21 October 2026. Source:
Legend: Blue = home team win; Yellow = draw; Red = away team win.

== Matches ==
Week 1

15 June 2026	Shan United	1-4	ISPE	Yangon
16:00 UTC+06:30	Win Thuzar Aung 18'		Moe Ma Ma Soe 32'; Sandar Lin 38'; Lin Myint Mo 41'; Su Pyae Pyae Kyaw 88'	Stadium: Thuwunna Stadium

16 June 2026	Young Lionesses	2-1	Myawady	Yangon
16:00 UTC+06:30	Nant Shin Thant Phyu Sin Pyone 21'; Sabal Win 82'		Thingyan Htay 86'	Stadium: Padonmar Stadium

16 June 2026	Yangon United	3-1	Yadanarbon	Yangon
16:00 UTC+06:30	Zin Moe Pyae 57', 85'; Shoon Lei Naing 87'		Nan Kwen Khay 86'	Stadium: YUSC Satdium

17 June 2026	Yangon City	0-3	Zwekapin United	Yangon
16:00 UTC+06:30			May July 21'; Gloria Fosuah 63'; Htake Tin Kyaw 90+3'	Stadium: Padonmar Stadium

17 June 2026	Thitsar Arman	0-4	Ayeyawady	Yangon
16:00 UTC+06:30			Naw Htet Htet Wai 43', 58'; Lae Lae Hlaing 45+3'; San Thaw Thaw 83'	Stadium: Thuwunna Stadium

Week 2

22 June 2026	Myawady	1-2	Yangon United	Yangon
16:00 UTC+06:30	Theingi Htwe 73'		Zin Moe Pyae 85'; Su Su Kyi 86'	Stadium: Thuwunna Stadium

22 June 2026	Zwekapin United	0-3	ISPE	Yangon
15:30 UTC+06:30			Shwe Yee Tun 4'; Me Me Zi 76'; Moe Pwint Phyu 89'	Stadium: YUSC Stadium

23 June 2026	Yangon City	0-6	Yadanarbon	Yangon
16:00 UTC+06:30			Win Theingi Tun 16', 53', 90'; Maria Layacan 17', 51'; Pin Myint Yan 84'	Stadium: Thuwunna Satdium

23 June 2026	Ayeyawady	3-0	Young Lionesses	Pathien
15:30 UTC+06:30	Alyssa Ube 37'; San Thaw Thaw 40', 76'			Stadium: Koe Thein Stadium

24 June 2026	Thitsar Arman	1-1	Shan United	Yangon
15:30 UTC+06:30	Win Win 90+2'		Nant May Thazin 83'	Stadium: Padonmar Stadium

Week 3

29 June 2026	Yangon United	2-1	Thitsar Arman	Yangon
15:30 UTC+06:30	Daisy Aung 65'; Zin Moe Pyae 70' (pen.)		Myat Noe Khin 38'	Stadium: YUSC Stadium

29 June 2026	Young Lionesses	9-0	Yangon City	Yangon
15:30 UTC+06:30	Pyae Paing Mhue Eain 25'; Myat Moe San 32'; Shin Thant Phyu Sin Pyone 38', 49', 63', 70', 71'; Saung Thazin Oo 67'; Win Yupar 83'			Stadium: Padonmar Stadium

30 June 2026	Ayeyawady	1-2	ISPE	Pathein
15:30 UTC+06:30	May Htet Lu 65'		Shwe Yee Tun 21', 48'	Stadium: Koe Thein Stadium

30 June 2026	Yadanarbon	7-1	Zwekapin United	Yangon
16:00 UTC+06:30	Win Sandar 1', 45+2'; May Sapal Phoo 11', 21'; Maria 55'; Pin Myint Yan 69'; Hnin Wint War Kyaw 84'		Gloria 58' (pen.)	Stadium: Thuwunna Stadium

1 July 2026	Myawady	0-2	Shan United	Yangon
16:00 UTC+06:30			Yu Per Khaing 55', 62'	Stadium: Thuwunna Stadium

Week 4

6 July 2026	Shan United	4-0	Young Lionesses	Yangon
15:30 UTC+06:30	Win Thuzar Aung 7'; Peace Ogla 40'; Sakyiwaa 58'; Thaw Tar Hnin 90+1'			Stadium: YUSC Stadium

6 July 2026	ISPE	2-0	Yangon United	Yangon
15:30 UTC+06:30	Lin Myint Mo 15'; Me Me Zin 40'			Stadium: Padonmar Stadium

7 July 2026	Yadanarbon	0-1	Myawady	Yangon
15:30 UTC+06:30			Mya Hnin Wai 78'	Stadium: Padonmar Stadium

8 July 2026	Thitsar Arman	4-0	Yangon City	Yangon
16:00 UTC+06:30	Myat Noe Khin 11', 90+3' (pen.); Zin Mar Htwe 48'; Wai Phoo Eain 70'			Stadium: YUSC Stadium

8 July 2026	Zwekapin United	0-5	Ayeyawady	Yangon
16:00 UTC+06:30			Nan Khaing Zin Myint 11', 71', 76'; Su Su Khin 24'; Ritu Porna Chakma 44'	Stadium: Thuwunna Stadium

Week 5

13 July 2026	Thitsar Arman	0-1	ISPE	Yangon
15:30 UTC+06:30			Sandar Lin 37'	Stadium: YUSC Stadium

13 July 2026	Young Lionesses	1-2	Yadanarbon	Yangon
15:30 UTC+06:30	Shin Thant Phyu Sin Pyone 83'		Pin Myint Yan 35'; Hnin Sandar Win 70'	Stadium: Padonmar Stadium

14 July 2026	Ayeyawady	2-1	Myawady	Yangon
15:30 UTC+06:30	Zitar Shin 23', 45+2'		Pont Pont Pyae Maung 55'	Stadium: YUSC Stadium

14 July 2026	Yangon City	0-5	Shan United	Yangon
15:30 UTC+06:30			Saung Hnin Phway 43'; Sandar Aung 48', 56', 76'; Nang Phyu Phyu Thwe 51'	Stadium: Padonmar Stadium

15 July 2026	Zwekapin United	0-3	Yangon United	Yangon
15:30 UTC+06:30			Zin Moe Pyae 40', 89'; Nan Cho Hmwe 59'	Stadium: YUSC Stadium

Week 6

20 July 2026	Yangon United	0-1	Ayeywady	Yangon
15:30 UTC+06:30			Ritu Porna Chakma 82'	Stadium: YUSC Stadium

20 July 2026	Yangon City	0-3	Myawady	Yangon
15:30 UTC+06:30			Pont Pont Pyae Maung 5', 14'; Mya Hnin Wai 22'	Stadium: Padonmar Stadium

21 July 2026	ISPE	0-0	Yadanarbon	Yangon
15:30 UTC+06:30				Stadium: YUSC Stadium

22 July 2026	Thitsar Arman	4-0	Young Lionesses	Yangon
15:30 UTC+06:30	Myat Noe Khin 25', 40'; Win Win 45+3'; Wai Phoo Eain 90+2'			Stadium: YSUC Stadium

22 July 2026	Shan United	3-1	Zwekapin United	Taunggyi
15:30 UTC+06:30	Nan Phyu Phyu Thwe 32'; Thaw Tar Hnin 52'; Sandar AUng 65'		Ofori 15'	Stadium: Taunggyi Stadium

Week 7

27 July 2026	Yadanarbon	1-1	Ayeywady	Yangon
15:30 UTC+06:30	Win Theingi Tun 49'		Min Htone May Zi Tar 32'	Stadium: YUSC Stadium

27 July 2026	Shan United	0-0	Yangon United	Taunggyi
15:30 UTC+06:30				Stadium: Taunggyi Stadium

28 July 2026	Young Lionesses	0-6	Zwekapin United	Yangon
15:30 UTC+06:30			San San Htwe 30' (o.g.); Gloria Fosuah 66' (pen.); Belinda Ofori 62', 73', 88' (pen.); Rouguiatou Drame 81'	Stadium: YUSC Stadium

29 July 2026	Myawady	0-3	Thitsar Arman	Yangon
15:30 UTC+06:30			Myat Noe Khin 32'; Yoon Wati 37'; Khin San Lwin 50'	Stadium: TF-1 Stadium

29 July 2026	ISPE	8-0	Yangon City	Yangon
15:30 UTC+06:30	Hay Mann Soe 3', 78'; Su Pyae Pyae Kyaw 7'; Me Me Zin 37'; Thin Zar Cho 69'; Nyein Nyein Phyo 70'; Lin Myint Mo 90', 90+2'			Stadium: Padonmar Stadium

Week 8

3 August 2026	Yangon United	4-2	Young Lionesses	Yangon
15:30 UTC+06:30	Zin Moe Pyae 57', 90+2'; Hnin Wai Hnin 66', 86'		Nay Myo Thu Thu Aung 51'; Nan Kham Hwan 61'	Stadium: YUSC Stadium

3 August 2026	Zwekapin United	2-9	Thitsar Arman	Yangon
15:30 UTC+06:30	Yawl Lun Shayi 44'; Wai Phoo Eain 63' (o.g.)		Drame 7', 84' (o.g.); Yoon Wati 23', 50'; Myat Noe Khin 32', 34'; Win Win 59', 69'; Chit Su Wai 90+2'	Stadium: Padonmar Stadium

4 August 2026	Yangon City	0-3	Ayeyawady	Yangon
15:30 UTC+06:30			May Htet Lu 23'; Ritu Porna Chekma 62'; San Thaw Thaw 79'	Stadium: YUSC Stadium

5 August 2026	ISPE	3-0	Myawady	Yangon
15:30 UTC+06:30	Lin Myint Mo 75', 88', 90+3'			Stadium: YUSC Stadium

5 August 2026	Yadanarbon	1-2	Shan United	Yangon
15:30 UTC+06:30	Win Theingi Tun 68' (pen.)		Yu Ya Naing 8'; Saung Hnin Phway 32'	Stadium: Padonmar Stadium

Week 9

8 August 2026	Yangon United	4-0	Yangon City	Yangon
15:30 UTC+06:30	Nang Cho Hmwe 17', 18', 77'; Zin Moe Pyae 76'			Stadium: YUSC Stadium

9 August 2026	Myawady	1-0	Zwekapin United	Yangon
15:30 UTC+06:30	Mya Hnin Wai 18'			Stadium: Padonmar Stadium

9 August 2026	Ayeyawady	3-0	Shan United	Yangon
16:00 UTC+06:30	May Htet Lu 30'; Nang Khine Zin Myint 33'; Khine Thazin 48' (o.g.)			Stadium: Thuwunna Stadium

10 August 2026	Yadanarbon	0-3	Thitsar Arman	Yangon
15:30 UTC+06:30			Wai Phoo Eain 16'; Myat Noe Khin 47', 74'	Stadium: Padonmar Stadium

10 August 2026	Young Lionesses	0-10	ISPE	Yangon
16:00 UTC+06:30			Moe Moe Than 16', 72', 74'; Hay Mann Soe 21'; Lin Myint Mo 25', 38', 47'; Khin Marlar Tun 32', 88'; Aye Nandar Win 54'	Stadium: Thuwunna Stadium

Week 10

19 October 2026	Ayeyawady	0-0	Yadanarbon	Yangon
15:30 UTC+06:30				Stadium: Star City Stadium

19 October 2026	Yangon United	3-0	Shan United	Yangon
15:30 UTC+06:30	Zin Moe Pyae 48'; Swe Mar Aung 87'; May Thant Zin 90+3'			Stadium: YUSC Stadium

20 October 2026	Yangon City	0-4	ISPE	Yangon
16:00 UTC+06:30			Moe Ma Ma Soe 2'; Lin Myint Mo 11'; Than Than Nwe 35', 44'	Stadium: Padaythar Stadium

20 October 2026	Thitsar Arman	2-0	Myawady	Yangon
15:30 UTC+06:30	Phyu Hnin Thwe 88'; Nge Nge Htwe 90+1'			Stadium: Padonmar Stadium

21 October 2026	Zwekapin United	1-1	Young Lionesses	Yangon
15:30 UTC+06:30	Belinda Ofori 89'		Nan Kham Hwan 75'	Stadium: Padonmar Stadium

Week 11

26 October 2026	Yangon United	0-6	ISPE	Yangon
15:30 UTC+06:30			Lin Myint Mo 7', 47', 87'; Than Than Nwe 26', 41'; Amie Khaing 33' (o.g.)	Stadium: YSUC Stadium

26 October 2026	Ayeyawady	11-0	Zwekapin United	Yangon
15:30 UTC+06:30	Shin Thant Phyu Sin Pyone 7' (pen.), 64', 90+2'; Hinari Miyamoto 9', 12', 21', 57', 89', 90+3' (pen.); Nan Khaing Zin Myint 32'; Hanako Fujii 72'			Stadium: Star City Stadium

27 October 2026	Yangon City	0-1	Thitsar Arman	Yangon
16:00 UTC+06:30			Nge Nge Htwe 76'	Stadium: Padaythar Stadium

27 October 2026	Myawady	1-3	Yadanarbon	Yangon
15:30 UTC+06:30	Mya Hnin Wai 12'		Win Theingi Tun 36'; Maurine Achieng 41', 47'	Stadium: Padonmar Stadium

28 October 2026	Young Lionesses	1-4	Shan United	Yangon
15:30 UTC+06:30	Kha Wa Thon 15'		Win Thuzar Aung 27'; Saung Hnin Phwe; Sandar Aung; Yu Ya Naing 90+1'	Stadium: Padonmar Stadium

Week 12

14 December 2026	Shan United	v	Yangon City	Yangon
15:30 UTC+06:30				Stadium: Padonmar Stadium

15 December 2026	Yangon United	v	Zwekapin United	Yangon
15:30 UTC+06:30				Stadium: YUSC Stadium

15 December 2026	Myawady	v	Ayeywady	Yangon
16:00 UTC+06:30				Stadium: Padaythar Stadium

16 December 2026	ISPE	v	Thitsar Arman	Yangon
15:30 UTC+06:30				Stadium: Padonmar Stadium

16 December 2026	Yadanarbon	v	Young Lionesses	Mandalay
15:30 UTC+06:30				Stadium: Bahtoo Stadium

== Statistics ==
=== Top scorers ===
As of 27 October 2026

Rank	Player	Club	Goals
1	(Myanmar) Lin Myint Mo	ISPE	14
2	(Myanmar) Shin Thant Phyu Sin Pyone	Young Lionesses / Ayeyawady	10
2	(Myanmar) Myat Noe Khin	Thitsar Arman	10
2	(Myanmar) Zin Moe Pyae	Yangon United	10
3	(Japan) Hinari Miyamoto	Ayeyawady	6
3	(Myanmar) Win Theingi Tun	Yadanarbon	6
4	(Myanmar) Sandar Aung	Shan United	5
5	(Myanmar) San Thaw Thaw	Ayeyawady	4
5	(Myanmar) Win Win	Thitsar Arman	4
5	(Ghana) Belinda Ofori	Zwekapin United	4
5	(Myanmar) Nan Cho Hmwe	Yangon United	4

=== Top Assists ===
As of 27 October 2026

Rank	Player	Club	Assists
1	(Bangladesh) Ritu Porna Chakma	Ayeyawady	5
1	(Myanmar) Phyu Phyu Win	Ayeyawady	5
1	(Myanmar) Khin Marlar Tun	ISPE	5
1	(Myanmar) Lin Myint Mo	ISPE	5
2	(Myanmar) Shin Thant Phyu Sin Pyone	Young Lionesses	4
2	(Myanmar) Wai Hnin Phyo	ISPE	4
2	(Myanmar) Yoon Wati	Thitsar Arman	4
3	(Myanmar) May Htet Lu	Ayeyawady	3
3	(Myanmar) Moe Ma Ma Soe	ISPE	3
3	(Burundi) Peace Ogla	Shan United	3
3	(Myanmar) Nan Phyu Phyu Thwe	Shan United	3
3	(Myanmar) Win Win	Thitsar Arman	3
3	(Myanmar) Khin San Lwin	Thitsar Arman	3
3	(Myanmar) Zin Mar Htwe	Thitsar Arman	3
3	(Myanmar) Win Sandar	Yadanarbon	3
3	(Myanmar) Win Theingi Tun	Yadanarbon	3
3	(Myanmar) Nan Cho Hmwe	Yangon United	3
3	(Myanmar) Nan Kham Hwan	Young Lionesses	3

=== Clean sheets ===
As of 27 October 2026

Rank	Player	Club	Clean sheets
1	(Myanmar) Ei Sandar Zaw	Ayeyawady	8
2	(Myanmar) Zue Latt Nadi	ISPE	7
3	(Myanmar) Thu Zar Aung	Thitsar Arman	4
3	(Myanmar) Khine Zar Win	Shan United	3
3	(Myanmar) Myo Mya Mya Nyein	Thitsar Arman	
3	(Myanmar) Hla Hla Htwe	Yadanarbon	
3	(Myanmar) Phee Bay	Yangon United	
4	(Myanmar) Htet Eaindra Lin	ISPE	2
4	(Myanmar) Wine Tone Chit	Zwekapin United	2
5	(Myanmar) May Zin Nwe	Shan United	1
5	(Myanmar) Su Pyae Mon	ISPE	1
5	(Myanmar) Thet Htar Aung	Myawady	1
5	(Myanmar) Ei Tar Yar	Myawady	1
5	(Myanmar) Amie Khaing	Yangon United	1
5	(Myanmar) Kyawt Kay Khine	Young Lionesses	1

=== Hat-tricks ===
Player	For	Against	Result	Date
Win Theingi Tun	Yadanarbon	Yangon City	0-6	23 June 2026
Nant Shin Thant Phyu Sin Pyone	Young Lionesses	Yangon City	9-0	29 June 2026
Nan Khaing Zin Myint	Ayeyawady	Yangon City	0-5	8 July 2026
Sandar Aung	Shan United	Yangon City	0-5	14 July 2026
Belinda Ofori	Zwekapin United	Young Lionesses	0-6	28 July 2026
Lin Myint Mo	ISPE	Myawady	3-0	5 August 2026
Nang Cho Hwwe	Yangon United	Yangon City	4-0	8 August 2026
Lin Myint Mo	ISPE	Young Lionesses	0-10	10 August 2026
Moe Moe Than	ISPE	Young Lionesses	0-10	10 August 2026
Lin Myint Mo	ISPE	Yangon United	0-6	26 October 2026
Hinari Miyamoto	Ayeyawady	Zwekapin United	11-0	26 October 2026
Shin Thant Phyu Sin Pyone	Ayeyawady	Zwekapin United	11-0	26 October 2026

== Player statistics ==
- League opening goal: Win Thuzar Aung (Shan United W.F.C.)
- Youngest player: San San Htwe (15 years old)
- Oldest player: Khin Marlar Tun (36 years old)
- Youngest scorer: Shin Thant Phyu Sin Pyone (16 years old)
- Youngest Hat-trick scorer: Shin Thant Phyu Sin Pyone (16 years old)
- Oldest scorer: Khin Marlar Tun (36 years old)
- Fastest scorer: Win Sandar (52 seconds)
- Most consecutive matches scored: Zin Moe Pyae (3 matches)
- Longest clean sheet: Zue Latt Nadi (372 minutes) [27 October 2026]
- Most goals in a match: Shin Thant Phyu Sin Pyone (5 goals)

== The best goals ==
- Nan Kwen Khay : Yangon United 3-1 Yadanarbon
- Saung Hnin Phwe : Young Lionesses 1-4 Shan United

== Brocasting ==
All matches are broadcast free-to-air on Forever Group channels MRTV-4, Channel 7, and Reader Channel, while online streaming is available on the Pyone Play Sports YouTube channel.

== See also ==
- 2026–27 M League
- Myanmar National League Cup
- 2026–27 M League 2
- 2026 MNL League Cup
