= I.S.P.E W.F.C. =

Myanmar professional women's football club

I.S.P.E
- Full name: Institute of Sports & Physical Education Women Football Club
- Founded: 2016; 10 years ago
- Ground: Mandalarthiri Stadium
- Capacity: 31,270
- Owner(s): Department of Sports and Physical Education (under Ministry of Sports and Youth Affairs)
- Head coach: San San Thein
- League: Myanmar Women League
- 2025-26: 2nd
- Website: http://www.ispeyangon.com/
Home colours	Away colours

I.S.P.E Women Football Club is a Burmese professional football club based in Mandalay, Myanmar. Its women's section plays in the Myanmar Women League and took part in the AFC Women's Champions League.

== History ==
=== 2016 - 2026 ===
The ISPE Women’s Football Team, under the Sports and Physical Education Department, was founded in 2016. The club won its first Myanmar Women League title in the 2018–19 season, marking the beginning of a successful period. They secured a second championship in 2022 before relinquishing the title to Myawady in 2023.

ISPE regained the league title in the 2024 season, bringing their total to three championships. The club gained national recognition after their success in the AFC Women's Champions League qualifiers, where they were honoured by government officials. In the 2025–26 season, the club remained a strong contender and competed closely with Ayeyawady throughout the campaign. The title race was decided on the final matchday, where ISPE were ultimately surpassed by Ayeyawady and finished as runners-up. They also reached the group stage of the 2025–26 AFC Women's Champions League.

== Continental Women's record ==
International all results (home and away) lis ISPE goal tally first.

Season	Competition	Round	Club	Home	Away	Aggregate	Top scorer(s)	Goals
2022	AFC Women's Club Championship	Group stage	(Chinese Taipei) Taichung Blue Whale	2–3		3rd	(Myanmar) Khin Marlar Tun (Myanmar) Shwe Yee Tun	1
2022	AFC Women's Club Championship	Group stage	(Thailand) College of Asian Scholars	2–0		3rd	(Myanmar) Khin Marlar Tun (Myanmar) Shwe Yee Tun	1
2025–26	AFC Women's Champions League	Preliminary stage	(Guam) Strykers	9–0		1st	(Myanmar) San Thaw Thaw (Myanmar) Phyu Phyu Win (Myanmar) Linn Myint Mo	3
2025–26	AFC Women's Champions League	Preliminary stage	(Mongolia) Khovd Western	8–0		1st	(Myanmar) San Thaw Thaw (Myanmar) Phyu Phyu Win (Myanmar) Linn Myint Mo	3
2025–26	AFC Women's Champions League	Preliminary stage	(Philippines) Stallion Laguna	3–1		1st	(Myanmar) San Thaw Thaw (Myanmar) Phyu Phyu Win (Myanmar) Linn Myint Mo	3
2025–26	AFC Women's Champions League	Group stage	(South Korea) Suwon	0–5		4th	—	—
2025–26	AFC Women's Champions League	Group stage	(Japan) Tokyo Verdy Beleza	0–1		4th	—	—
2025–26	AFC Women's Champions League	Group stage	(North Korea) Naegohyang	0–3		4th	—	—

=== Women's Team ===
Season	League									Internationals		Top goalscorer		Coach
Season	Div.	Pos.	Pl.	W	D	L	GS	GA	P	AFC Women's Club Championship	AFC Women's Champions League	Name	Goals	Coach
2016-17														
2017-18	1st	6th	14	3	2	9	19	37	11					
2018-19	1st	1st	14	12	1	1	90	7	37			(Myanmar) Ye Ye Oo	14	
2022	1st	1st	12	10	1	1	80	9	31	Group stage		(Myanmar) Khin Marlar Tun	18	
2023	1st	2nd	10	7	2	1	51	9	23			(Myanmar) Khin Marlar Tun	16	
2024	1st	1st	18	15	3	0	57	7	48			(Myanmar) Linn Myint Mo	19	(Myanmar) San San Thein
2025-26	1st	2nd	16	11	4	1	47	7	37		Group Stage	(Myanmar) Shwe Yee Tun	16	(Myanmar) San San Thein
2026–27	1st													(Myanmar) San San Thein

== Players ==
=== Current squad ===
As of June 2026

Note: Flags indicate national team as defined under FIFA eligibility rules; some limited exceptions apply. Players may hold more than one non-FIFA nationality.

No.	Pos.	Nation	Player
1	GK	MYA	Zu Latt Nadi
3	DF	MYA	Moe Ma Ma Soe
6	DF	MYA	Than Than Nwe
9	FW	MYA	Moe Pwint Phyu
10	MF	MYA	Khin Marlar Tun (Captain)
16	FW	MYA	Moe Moe Than
17	MF	MYA	Lin Myint Mo (Vice-captain)
18	GK	MYA	Htet Ei Nandar Linn
19	FW	MYA	Shwe Yee Tun
20	GK	MYA	May Oo Khine
21	DF	MYA	Thin Zar Cho

No.	Pos.	Nation	Player
22	FW	MYA	Linn Lae Oo
23	MF	MYA	Yin Loon Eain
24	DF	MYA	Chit Pwint Aung
25	MF	MYA	Me Me Zin
26	DF	MYA	Nyein Nyein Phyo
27	DF	MYA	Hnin Pwint Aye
32	DF	MYA	Su Pyae Pyae Kyaw
34	DF	MYA	Khin Htay Kying
36	DF	MYA	Aye Nandar Win
38	DF	MYA	Sandar Linn
43	DF	MYA	Hay Mann Soe
45	DF	MYA	Wai Hnin Phyo
47	DF	MYA	Kay Thwe Phyo Oo
49	MF	MYA	Nang Hon Hlaing

== Kits and sponsors ==
Period	Kit manufacturer	Title sponsor
2024 - 2025	(Myanmar) Pro Sport	
2026 -	(Myanmar) M21	

== Honours ==
=== Domestic League ===
- Myanmar Women League
  - (gold) Champions (3): 2018-19, 2022, 2024
