= 2023 Myanmar Women's League =

Myanmar Women League
- Season: 2023
- Champions: Myawady
- AFC Champions League: Myawady
- Matches: 30
- Goals: 136 (4.53 per match)
- Top goalscorer: San Thaw Thaw; Khin Marlar Tun (16 goals)
- Best goalkeeper: May Zin Nwe; Htet Eindra Lin (5 matches)

The 2023 Myanmar Women's League was the 5th season of the Myanmar Women's League, the top-tier professional women's football league in Myanmar. A total of 6 teams competed in the league, with the season beginning in June 2023. Myawady W.F.C. emerged as the champions, securing their spot in the 2024–25 AFC Women's Champions League

== Clubs ==
=== Personnel and sponsoring ===
Note: Flags indicate national team as has been defined under FIFA eligibility rules. Players may hold more than one non-FIFA nationality.

Team	Head coach	Captain	Kit manufacturer	Shirt sponsor
ISPE	(Myanmar) Daw Nu Nu Khaing Win	(Myanmar) Khin Mar Lar Tun	(Myanmar) Glory Sport	(Myanmar) Sport Lover
Myawady	(Myanmar) U Zin Htoo	(Myanmar) Aye Aye Moe	(Myanmar) M21	
Thitsar Arman	(Myanmar) U KB Siang Cung Lian	(Myanmar) Shwe Win Tun	(Myanmar) Fit	
Sport & Education	(Myanmar) Daw San San Thein	(Myanmar) May Thu Aung	(Myanmar) Fit	
Yangon United	(Myanmar) U Kyaw Soe Oo	(Myanmar) Lae Lae Hlaing	(Myanmar) M21	(Myanmar) FNI
Young Lionesses	(Myanmar) U Than Wai	(Myanmar) Aye Aye Htwe	(Thailand) Warrix	

== League table ==
Pos	Team	Pld	W	D	L	GF	GA	GD	Pts	Qualification
1	Myawady W.F.C (C)	10	8	2	0	33	5	+28	26	Qualification to 2024–25 AFC Women's Champions League
2	I.S.P.E W.F.C.	10	7	2	1	51	9	+42	23	
3	Thitsar Arman W.F.C	10	6	1	3	28	11	+17	19	
4	Yangon United W.F.C	10	3	1	6	10	26	−16	10	
5	Sport & Education W.F.C	10	3	0	7	12	32	−20	9	
6	Young Lionesses W.F.C	10	0	0	10	2	53	−51	0	

Updated to match(es) played on unknown. Source:
(C) Champions

== Matches ==
Fixtures and Results of the 2023 Women League season.

=== Week 1 ===
14/6/2023	ISPE	3–2	Yangon United	Padonmar Stadium, Yangon
15:30 UTC+06:30	Su Pyae Pyae Kyaw 55'; Lin Lae Oo 79'; Lin Myint Oo 90+3'		Zin Moe Pyae 14', 29' (pen.)

14/6/2023	Sport & Education	4–0	Young Lionesses	Sa Lin Stadium, Yangon
15:30 UTC+06:30	May Thet Oo 11', 69'; Moe Moe Than 43'; Sandar Lin 90'

15/6/2023	Thitsar Arman	1–2	Myawady	Sa Lin Stadium, Yangon
15:30 UTC+06:30	WIn Win 7'		Pont Pont Pyae Maung 9'; May Sabei Phyoo 21'

=== Week 2 ===
20/6/2023	Yangon United	0–2	Thitsar Arman	Sa Lin Stadium, Yangon
15:30 UTC+06:30			Khin San Lwin 14'; July Kyaw 18'

20/6/2023	ISPE	7–0	Sport & education	Padonmar Stadium, Yangon
15:30 UTC+06:30	Shwe Yee Tun 7', 14', 29'; Lin Myint Mo 17'; Than Than Wai 38'; May Htet Lu 79', 90+2'

21/6/2023	Myawady	14–0	Young Lionesses	Sa Lin Stadium, Yangon
15:30 UTC+06:30	Pan Ei Khaing 26'; May Sabei Phoo 31', 64'; San Thaw Thaw 35', 47', 70'; Yupar Khine 41', 45+1', 56'; Khaing Thazin 63', 88'; Aye Myat Khaing 68'; Pont Pont Pyae Maung 72', 81'

=== Week 3 ===
19/7/2023	Young Lionesses	1–5	ISPE	Sa Lin Stadium, Yangon
15:30 UTC+06:30	Kat Thaw Phyo Oo 39'		Su Pyae Pyae Kyaw 12'; Khin Ma Lar Tun 16', 84'; Moe Ma Ma Soe 72'; Zin Moe Htet 74'

20/7/2023	Myawady	2–0	Yangon United	Sa Lin Stadium, Yangon
15:30 UTC+06:30	San Thaw Thaw 10', 41'			Referee: Daw Zin Mar Oo

20/7/2023	Sport & Education	1–2	Thitsar Arman	Padonmar Stadium, Yangon
15:30 UTC+06:30	Thidar Khaing 31'		July Kyaw 49', 85'	Referee: Daw Khwa Nyo Thin

=== Week 4 ===
23/7/2023	Young Lionesses	1–5	Thitsar Arman	Sa Lin Stadium, Yangon
15:30 UTC+06:30	Jue Htet Wai 33'		Myat Noe Khin 11'; July Kyaw 13'; Win Win 59', 74'; Wai Phoo Eain 83'

23/7/2023	Yangon United	1–3	Sport & Education	Pandonmar Stadium, Yangon
15:30 UTC+06:30	Yoon Wadi Hlaing 54'		Moe Moe Than 16', 70'; Ar Zoon Thar 60'

24/7/2023	ISPE	1–2	Myawady	Sa Lin Stadium, Yangon
15:30 UTC+06:30	Su Pyae Pyae Kyaw 61' (pen.)		San Thaw Thaw 21'; Phyu Phyu Win 34'

=== Week 5 ===
27/7/2023	Young Lionesses	0–3	Yangon UNited	Padonmar Stadium, Yangon
15:30 UTC+06:30			Zin Moe Pyae 30'; Pan Ei Nwe 54'; Yoon Wadi Hlaing 84'

27/7/2023	Thitsar Arman	3–4	ISPE	Sa Lin Stadium, Yangon
15:30 UTC+06:30	Khin Mo Mo Tun 4'; Khin Moe Wai 52'; Win Win 70'		Nant May Thazin 11'; Lin Myat Oo 28', 62'; Su Pyae Pyae Kyaw 46'

28/7/2023	Myawady	2–1	Sport & Education	Padonmar Stadium, Yangon
15:30 UTC+06:30	Khaing Thazin 45+1'; San Thaw Thaw 86'		Kyi Pyar Lin 15'

=== Week 6 ===
3/8/2023	Sports & Education	0–2	Myawady	Padonmar Stadium, Yangon
15:30 UTC+06:30			San Thaw Thaw 5'; Yu Par Khin 38'

4/8/2023	ISPE	0–0	Thitsar Arman	Sa Lin Stadium, Yangon
15:30 UTC+06:30

4/8/2023	Yangon United	1–0	Young Lionesses	Padonmar Stadium, Yangon
15:30 UTC+06:30	Zin Moe Pyae 13'

=== Week 7 ===
8/8/2023	Sports & Education	0–12	ISPE	Padonmar Stadium, Yangon
15:30 UTC+06:30			Khin Marlar Tun 13', 18', 68', 73'; Hay Mann Soe 23'; Zin Moe Htet 45', 76'; Than Than Wai 46'; Me Me Zin 62'; Su Pyae Pyae Kyaw 70'; Lin Myint Mo 85', 88'

8/8/2023	Thitsar Arman	4–0	Yangon United	Sa Lin Stadium, Yangon
15:30 UTC+06:30	Khin Moe Moe Tun 24'; Myat Noe Khin 29', 38'; Win Win 82'

9/8/2023	Young Lionesses	0–6	Myawady	Padonmar Stadium, Yangon
15:30 UTC+06:30			San Thaw Thaw 22', 29', 33', 76', 90'; Aye Myo Myat 41'

=== Week 8 ===
14/8/2023	ISPE	7–0	Young Lioness	Padonmar Stadium, Yangon
15:30 UTC+06:30	Khin Mar Lar Tun 11', 64', 90+3'; Yin Loon Eain 15', 51'; Lin Myint Mo 19'; Lin Lae Oo 74'

15/8/2023	Yangon United	0–0	Myawady	Padonmar Stadium, Yangon
15:30 UTC+06:30

15/8/2023	Thitsar Arman	3–1	Sport & Education	Sa Lin Stadium, Yangon
15:30 UTC+06:30	Khin Mo Mo Tun 35'; Myat Noe Khin 84' (pen.); Khin San Lwin 89'		Moe Moe Than 40'

=== Week 9 ===
19/8/2023	Sport & Education	1–0	Young Lionesss	Padonmar Stadium, Yangon
15:30 UTC+06:30	Moe Moe Than 75'

19/8/2023	Yangon United	0–11	ISPE	Sa Lin Stadium, Yangon
15:30 UTC+06:30

20/8/2023	Myawady	2–1	Thitsar Arman	Padonmar Stadium, Yangon
15:30 UTC+06:30	San Thaw Thaw 11', 45+1'		Win Win 84'

=== Week 10 ===
26/8/2023	Thitsar Arman	7–0	Young Lionesss	Padonmar Stadium, Yangon
15:30 UTC+06:30	Myat Noe Khin 19', 74'; Win Win 46', 60', 90'; Wai Phoo Eain 62'; Khin Mo Mo Tun 76'

26/8/2023	Sport & Education	1–3	Yangon United	Sa Lin Stadium, Yangon
15:30 UTC+06:30	Sandar Lin 34'		Yoon Wadi Hlaing 24'; Pan Ei Nwe 71'; Zin Moe Pyae 84'

27/8/2023	Myawady	1–1	ISPE	Thuwunna Stadium, Yangon
15:30 UTC+06:30	San Thaw Thaw 42'		Nant May Thazin 24'

== Season statistics ==
=== Top scorers ===
As of 27 August 2023.

Rank	Player	Club	Goals
1	(Myanmar) San Thaw Thaw	Myawady	16
1	(Myanmar) Khin Marlar Tun	ISPE	16
2	(Myanmar) Win Win	Thitsar Arman	10
3	(Myanmar) Lin Myint Mo	ISPE	7
4	(Myanmar) Su Pyae Pyae Kyaw	ISPE	6
4	(Myanmar) Myat Noe Khin	Thitsar Arman	6
4	(Myanmar) Zin Moe Pyae	Yangon United W.F.C	6
5	(Myanmar) Moe Moe Than	Sport & Education	5
6	(Myanmar) July Kyaw	Thitsar Arman	4
6	(Myanmar) Khin Moe Moe Tun	Thitsar Arman	4
6	(Myanmar) Yuper Khine	Myawady	4
7	(Myanmar) Yoon Wadi Hlaing	Yangon United	3
7	(Myanmar) May Sabei Phoo	Myawady	3
7	(Myanmar) Shwe Yee Tun	ISPE	3
7	(Myanmar) Zin Moe Htet	ISPE	3
7	(Myanmar) Pont Pont Pyaw Maung	Myawady	3
8	(Myanmar) Yin Loon Eain	ISPE	2
8	(Myanmar) Sandar Lin	Sport & Education	2
8	(Myanmar) Wai Phoo Eain	Thitsar Arman	2
8	(Myanmar) Pan Ei Nwe	Yangon United	2
8	(Myanmar) Than Than Wai	ISPE	2
8	(Myanmar) Khaing Thazin	Myawady	2
8	(Myanmar) Nant May Thazin	ISPE	2
8	(Myanmar) Aye Myat Khaing	Myawady	2
8	(Myanmar) May Thet Oo	Sport & Education	2
8	(Myanmar) Lin Latt Oo	ISPE	2
8	(Myanmar) Khin San Lwin	Thitsar Arman	2
9	(Myanmar) May Htet Lu	ISPE	1
9	(Myanmar) Moe Ma Ma Soe	ISPE	1
9	(Myanmar) Pan Ei Khaing	Myawady	1
9	(Myanmar) Thidar Khaing	Sport & Education	1
9	(Myanmar) Kat Thaw Phyo Oo	Younng Lionesses	1
9	(Myanmar) Than Than Wai	ISPE	1
9	(Myanmar) Kyi Pyar Lin	Sport & Education	1
9	(Myanmar) Khin Moe Wai	Thitsar Arman	1
9	(Myanmar) Hay Mann Soe	ISPE	1
9	(Myanmar) Aye Myo Myat	Myawady	1
9	(Myanmar) Me Me Zin	ISPE	1

=== Clean sheets ===
As of 26 August 2023.

Rank	Player	Club	Clean sheets
1	(Myanmar) May Zin Nwe	Myawady W.F.C	5
1	(Myanmar) Htet Eaindra Lin	ISPE W.F.C	5
2	(Myanmar) Thu Zar Aung	Thitsar Arman W.F.C	4
3	(Myanmar) Phee Bay	Yangon United W.F.C	3
4	(Myanmar) Zu Latt Nadi	Sport & Education W.F.C	2

== See also ==
- Myanmar National League
- MNL-2
