= 2024 Myanmar Women's League =

Myanmar Women League
- Season: 2024
- Champions: ISPE
- AFC Champions League: ISPE
- Matches: 63
- Goals: 203 (3.22 per match)
- Top goalscorer: San Thaw Thaw; Lin Myint Mo (19 goals)
- Best goalkeeper: Phee Bay (7 matches)
- Biggest home win: Ayeyawady 6–0 YREO W.F.C (14 August 2024)
- Biggest away win: Shan United 0–7 Thitsar Arman W.F.C (11 June 2024)
- Highest scoring: Myawady W.F.C 1-7 ISPE W.F.C (2 October 2024)
- Longest winning run: 13 matches I.S.P.E W.F.C
- Longest unbeaten run: 18 matches (I.S.P.E W.F.C)
- Longest winless run: 13 matches (Shan United)
- Longest losing run: 10 matches (Shan United)

The 2024 Myanmar Women's League was the 6th season of the Myanmar Women's League, the top-tier professional women's football league in Myanmar. A total of 7 clubs competed in the league, which began in May 2024. Myawady W.F.C. entered the season as the defending champions, having won the title in 2023. At the end of the season, ISPE W.F.C. secured their third league title and qualified for the 2025–26 AFC Women's Champions League.

== Personnel and sponsorship ==
Note: Flags indicate national team as has been defined under FIFA eligibility rules. Players may hold more than one non-FIFA nationality.

Club	Head coach	Captain	Kit manufacturer	Shirt sponsor
Ayeyawady	(Myanmar) Daw Nu Nu Khaing Win	(Myanmar) Khin Mar Lar Tun	(Myanmar) Glory Sport	(Myanmar) Gerizim
ISPE	(Myanmar) Daw San San Thein	(Myanmar) Lin Myint Mo	(Myanmar) SCM	
Myawady	(Myanmar) U Ayar Maung	(Myanmar) Aye Aye Moe	(Myanmar) M21	
Shan United	(Myanmar) Daw Zin Mar Wann	(Myanmar) Saung Hnin Phwe	(Myanmar) Foxx	(Myanmar) Emarald
Thitsar Arman	(Myanmar) U Moe Kyaw Htwe	(Myanmar) Chit Chit	(Myanmar) Foxx	
Yangon United	(Myanmar) U Kyaw Soe Oo	(Myanmar) Phyu Phwe	(Myanmar) Glory Sport	(Myanmar) AGD Bank
YREO	(Myanmar) U Than Wai	(Myanmar) Khin Phone	(Thailand) Warrix	

== League table ==
Pos	Team	Pld	W	D	L	GF	GA	GD	Pts	Qualification
1	ISPE W.F.C	18	15	3	0	57	7	+50	48	Qualification to 2025–26 AFC Women's Champions League
2	Yangon United	18	12	4	2	38	12	+26	40	
3	Ayeyawady	18	8	3	7	31	26	+5	27	
4	Myawady W.F.C	18	8	2	8	28	28	0	26	
5	Thitsar Arman W.F.C	18	6	4	8	24	32	−8	22	
6	Shan United	18	3	1	14	15	48	−33	10	
7	YREO W.F.C	18	2	1	15	10	50	−40	7	

Updated to match(es) played on unknown. Source:

== Matches ==
Fixtures and Results of the 2024 Women League season.

=== Week 1 ===
7 May 2024	Myawady	0-2	Yangon United	Padonmar Stadium, Yangon
15:45 UTC+06:30			Nan Cho Hmue 15'; Yoon Nadi Hlaing 45+3'

7 May 2024	Ayeyawady	2-0	Thitsar Arman	Sa Lin Stadium, Yangon
15:30 UTC+06:30	Zi Tar Shin 42'; Lae Lae Hlaing 70'

8 May 2024	Shan United	0-1	ISPE	Sa Lin Stadium, Yangon
15:30 UTC+06:30			Wai Hnin Phyo 54' (pen.)

=== Week 2 ===
13 May 2024	YREO	0-5	Myawady	Sa Lin Stadium, Yangon
15:45 UTC+06:30			Phyu Phyu Win 6', 58'; Yu Per Khaing 20', 36', 49'

14 May 2024	ISPE	1-1	Ayeyawady	Padonmar Stadium, Yangon
15:30 UTC+06:30	Wai Hnin Phyo 52'		Zi Tar Shin 61'

14 May 2024	Thitsar arman	0-4	Yangon United	Sa Lin Stadium, Yangon
15:30 UTC+06:30			Pan Ei Nwe 39'; Nan Cho Hmue 42'; Yoon Wadi Hlang 54'; Win Theingi Tun 73'

=== Week 3 ===
18 May 2024	Shan United	0-2	YREO	Sa Lin Stadium, Yangon
15:45 UTC+06:30			Su Su Khin 5'; Thin Thin Maw 90+4'

18 May 2024	Yangon United	0-2	ISPE	Y.U.S.C Stadium, Yangon
15:30 UTC+06:30			Shwe Yee Tun 45+2'; Lin Myint Mo 81'

19 May 2024	Myawady	0-0	Thitsar arman	Sa Lin Stadium, Yangon
15:30 UTC+06:30

=== Week 4 ===
23 May 2024	Shan United	0-6	Myawady	Sa Lin Stadium, Yangon
15:45 UTC+06:30			Phyu Phyu Win 1', 85', 90+2' (pen.); Yuper Khaig 31', 40'; Pan Ei Khaing 47'

23 May 2024	YREO	1-2	Ayeyawady	Padonmar Stadium, Yangon
15:30 UTC+06:30	Shwe Pon Chit 18'		San Thaw Thaw 24', 83' (pen.)

24 May 2024	ISPE	0-0	Thitsar arman	Sa Lin Stadium, Yangon
15:30 UTC+06:30

=== Week 5 ===
30 May 2024	Myawady	0-3	ISPE	Padonmar Stadium, Yangon
15:45 UTC+06:30			Yin Loon Eain 49'; Lin Myit Mo 75', 78'

30 May 2024	YREO	0-3	Yangon United	Sa Lin Stadium, Yangon
15:30 UTC+06:30			Aye Aye Soe 30' (o.g); Yoon Wadi Hlaing 40'; Swe Mar Aung 53'

31 May 2024	Ayeyawady	3-0	Shan United	Y.U.S.C Stadium, Yangon
15:30 UTC+06:30	San Thaw Thaw 13', 83'; Zi Tar Shin 73'

=== Week 6 ===
5/6/2024	Thitsar Arman	3-0	YREO	Sa Lin Stadium, Yangon
15:45 UTC+06:30	Wai Phoo Eain 12'; Zin Mar Htwe 39'; Myat Noe Khin 41' (pen.)

5 June 2024	Yangon United	4-0	Shan United	Y.U.S.C Stadium, Yangon
15:30 UTC+06:30	Yoon Wadi Hlaing 6'; Zin Moe Pyae 11'; Win Theingi Tun 62'; Swe Mar Aung 65'

6 June 2024	Ayeyawady	1-2	Myawady	Padonmar Stadium, Yangon
15:30 UTC+06:30	San Thaw Thaw 50'		Pan Ei Khaing 52', 56'

=== Week 7 ===
10 June 2024	Yangon United	2-0	Ayeyawady	Y.U.S.C Stadium, Yangon
15:45 UTC+06:30	Yoon Nadi Hlaing 19'; Aye Aye Htwe 78'

11 June 2024	Shan United	0-7	Thitsar Arman	Sa Lin Stadium, Yangon
15:30 UTC+06:30			Myat Noe Khin 18', 41', 44'; Win WIn 21', 31'; Yoon Wai Ti 66'; Zin Mar Htwe 68'

11 June 2024	ISPE	4-2	YREO	Padonmar Stadium, Yangon
15:30 UTC+06:30	Yin Loon Eain 11', 18', 58'; Htet Hnin Htwe 52' (o.g)		Win Sandar 28'; Ya Min Phyu 49' (pen.)

=== Week 8 ===
17 July 2024	Shan	1-2	Ayeyawady	Sa Lin Stadium, Yangon
15:45 UTC+06:30	Yu Ya Naing 66'		May Thingyan Moe 38'; Nant Shin Thant Phyu Zin Phyoe 78'

18 July 2024	ISPE	3-0	Myawady	Padonmar Stadium, Yangon
15:30 UTC+06:30	Su Pyae Pyae Kyaw 3'; Shwe Yee Tun 12'; Than Than Nwe 88'

18 July 2024	Yangon United	2-0	YREO	Sa Lin Stadium, Yangon
15:30 UTC+06:30	Swe Mar Aung 18'; Win Theingi Tun 45+1'

=== Week 9 ===
22 July 2024	YREO	1-1	Thitsar arman	Padonmar Stadium, Yangon
15:45 UTC+06:30	Su Su Khin 50'		Myat Noe Khin 90+4'

22 July 2024	Shan	1-4	Yangon United	Sa Lin Stadium, Yangon
15:30 UTC+06:30	Nang Phyu Phyu Thwe 16'		Pan Ei Nwe 6'; Yoon Wadi Hlaing 57'; Win Theingi Tun 83'; Hnin Lin latt Hlaing 90+4'

23 July 2024	Myawady	1-2	Ayeyawady	Sa Lin Stadium, Yangon
15:30 UTC+06:30	Pan Ei Khaing 76'		Naw Htet Htet Wai 44'; San Thaw Thaw 51'

=== Week 10 ===
28 July 2024	Yangon United	2-2	Myawady	Y.U.S.C Stadium, Yangon
15:45 UTC+06:30	Win Theingi Tun 35' (pen.); Yu Yu Naing 61'		Yu Per Khaing 30'; Phyu Phyu Win 90+1'

28 July 2024	ISPE	3-1	Shan United	Padonmar Stadium, Yangon
15:30 UTC+06:30	Nu Nu 3'; Lin Myint Mo 47'; Yin Loon Eain 54'		May Sabel Phoo 90+2'

29 July 2024	Thitsar arman	4-2	Ayeyawady	Sa Lin Stadium, Yangon
15:30 UTC+06:30	Khin San Lwin 27', 58'; Phoo Pwint Khaing 43'; Myat Noe Khin 60' (pen.)		San Thaw Thaw 83', 90+4'

=== Week 11 ===
2 August 2024	ISPE	5-0	Yangon United	Sa Lin Stadium, Yangon
15:45 UTC+06:30	Nu Nu 23'; Lin Myint Mo 38', 84', 90+1'; Yin Loon Eain 74'

3 August 2024	YREO	1-0	Shan	Y.U.S.C Stadium, Yangon
15:30 UTC+06:30	Khin Bhone 18'

3 August 2024	Thitsar arman	0-1	Myawady	Padonmar Stadium, Yangon
15:30 UTC+06:30			Yuper Khaing 6'

=== Week 12 ===
8 August 2024	Myawady	2-1	YREO	Sa Lin Stadium, Yangon
15:45 UTC+06:30	Khaing Thazin 76'; Yuper Khaing 90+6'		Su Su Khin 51'

9 August 2024	Ayeyawady	1-4	ISPE	Padonmar Stadium, Yangon
15:30 UTC+06:30	San Thaw Thaw 72'		Lin Myint Mo 34', 55'; Shwe Yee Tun 43'; Nu Nu 90+2'

9 August 2024	Yangon United	4-0	Thitsar arman	Y.U.S.C Stadium, Yangon
15:30 UTC+06:30	Win Theingi Tun 10', 79'; Yoon Wadi Hlaing 45+4', 83'

=== Week 13 ===
13 August 2024	Thitsar arman	0-3	ISPE	Sa Lin Stadium, Yangon
15:45 UTC+06:30			Lin Myint Mo 9'; Shwe Yee Tun 14'; Nu Nu 30'

13 August 2024	Myawady	2-1	Shan	Padonmar Stadium, Yangon
15:30 UTC+06:30	Hla Yin Win 38', 87'		Win Sandar 27'

14 August 2024	Ayeyawady	6-0	YREO	Y.U.S.C Stadium, Yangon
15:30 UTC+06:30	San Thaw Thaw 8', 13', 15', 90', 90+2'; May Thingyan Moe 18'

=== Week 14 ===
19 August 2024	Ayeyawady	1-1	Yangon United	Padonmar Stadium, Yangon
15:45 UTC+06:30	San Thaw Thaw 87'		Zin Moe Pyae 36'

20 August 2024	Thitsar arman	2-2	Shan United	Y.U.S.C Stadium, Yangon
15:30 UTC+06:30	Aye Myat Khaing 52' (o.g); Phoo Pwint Khaine 85'		Win Sandar 21'; Nang Phyu Phyu Thwe 90'

20 August 2024	YREO	0-4	ISPE	Sa Lin Stadium, Yangon
15:30 UTC+06:30			Lin Myint Mo 4'; Hay Mann Soe 61', 86'; Su Pyae Pyae Kyaw 75'

=== Week 15 ===
6 September 2024	Thitsar arman	1-0	YREO	Padonmar Stadium, Yangon
15:45 UTC+06:30	Win Win 27'

6 September 2024	Ayeyawady	3-0	Myawady	Sa Lin Stadium, Yangon
15:30 UTC+06:30	San Thaw Thaw 31'; Naw Htet Htet Wai 45+1'; Phyu Phyu Kyaw 58'

7 September 2024	Shan	0-2	Yangon United	Padonmar Stadium, Yangon
15:30 UTC+06:30			Yoon Wadi Hlaing 3'; Zin Moe Pyae 5'

=== Week 16 ===
13 September 2024	ISPE	6-0	Thitsar arman	Sa Lin Stadium, Yangon
15:45 UTC+06:30

13 September 2024	YREO	v	Ayeyawady	Padonmar Stadium, Yangon
15:30 UTC+06:30

14 September 2024	Shan	1-0	Myawady	Sa Lin Stadium, Yangon
15:30 UTC+06:30

=== Week 17 ===
18 September 2024	Thitsar arman	0-3	Yangon United	Sa Lin Stadium, Yangon
15:45 UTC+06:30

19 September 2024	ISPE	3-0	Ayeyawady	Padonmar Stadium, Yangon
15:30 UTC+06:30

19 September 2024	YREO	1-3	Myawady	Sa Lin Stadium, Yangon
15:30 UTC+06:30

=== Week 18 ===
25 September 2024	Yangon United	1-1	Ayeyawady	Y.U.S.C Stadium, Yangon
15:45 UTC+06:30

25 September 2024	ISPE	5-0	YREO	Padonmar Stadium, Yangon
15:30 UTC+06:30

26 September 2024	Thitsar arman	4-1	Shan	Padonmar Stadium, Yangon
15:30 UTC+06:30

=== Week 19 ===
2 October 2024	Yangon United	3-0	YREO	Y.U.S.C Stadium, Yangon
15:45 UTC+06:30

2 October 2024	Myawady	1-7	ISPE	Sa Lin Stadium, Yangon
15:30 UTC+06:30

2 October 2024	Ayeyawady	1-3	Shan	Padonmar Stadium, Yangon
15:30 UTC+06:30

=== Week 20 ===
30 October 2024	Ayeyawady	0-2	Thitsar arman	Y.U.S.C Stadium, Yangon
15:45 UTC+06:30			Myat Noe Khin 36'; Wai Phoo Eain 59'

30 October 2024	Shan	1-3	ISPE	Sa Lin Stadium, Yangon
15:30 UTC+06:30	Aye Myat Khaing 83'		Shwe Yee Tun 27'; Hay Mern Soe 47'; Lin Myint Mo 48'

30 October 2024	Myawady	0-1	Yangon United	Padonmar Stadium, Yangon
15:30 UTC+06:30			Zin Moe Pyae 8'

=== Week 21 ===
4 November 2024	Shan	3-1	YREO	Sa Lin Stadium, Yangon
15:45 UTC+06:30	Sandar Aung 15', 19'; Nang Phyu Phyu Htwe 57'		Thin Thin Maw 11'

9 November 2024	Yangon United	0-0	ISPE	Y.U.S.C Stadium, Yangon
15:30 UTC+06:30

9 November 2024	Myawady	3-0	Thitsar Arman	Thuwunna Stadium, Yangon
15:30 UTC+06:30	Chit Chit 71' (o.g); Yu Par Khaing 74', 87'

== Season statistics ==
=== Top goalscorers ===
Rank	Player	Club	Goals
1	(Myanmar) San Thaw Thaw	Ayeyawady	15
2	(Myanmar) Lin Myint Mo	ISPE Women's	10
3	(Myanmar) Yu Par Khaing	Myawady Women's	8
3	(Myanmar) Yoon Wadi Hlaing	Yangon United	8

=== Clean sheets ===
As of 10 Sept 2024.

Rank	Player	Club	Clean sheets
1	(Myanmar) Phee Bay	Yangon United	7
2	(Myanmar) Myo Mya Mya Nyein	Thitsar arman Women's	5
2	(Myanmar) Ei Sandar Zaw	Myawady Women's	5
3	(Myanmar) May Oo Khin	ISPE Women's	4
3	(Myanmar) May Thu Aung	Ayeyawady	4

=== Hat-tricks ===
Player	For	Against	Result	Date
(Myanmar) Yu Par Khaing	Myawady Women's	ISPE Women's	0-5	May 13, 2024
(Myanmar) Phyu Phyu Win	Myawady Women's	Shan United	0-6	May 23, 2024
(Myanmar) Lin Myint Mo	ISPE Women's	Yangon United	5-0	August 2, 2024

== Prize money ==
- Champion = 20,000,000 MMK
- 1st runner-up = 15,000,000 MMK
- 2nd runner-up = 10,000,000 MMK

== See also ==
- 2024 Myanmar National League
- 2024 MNL League Cup
