= 2022 AFC Women's Club Championship =

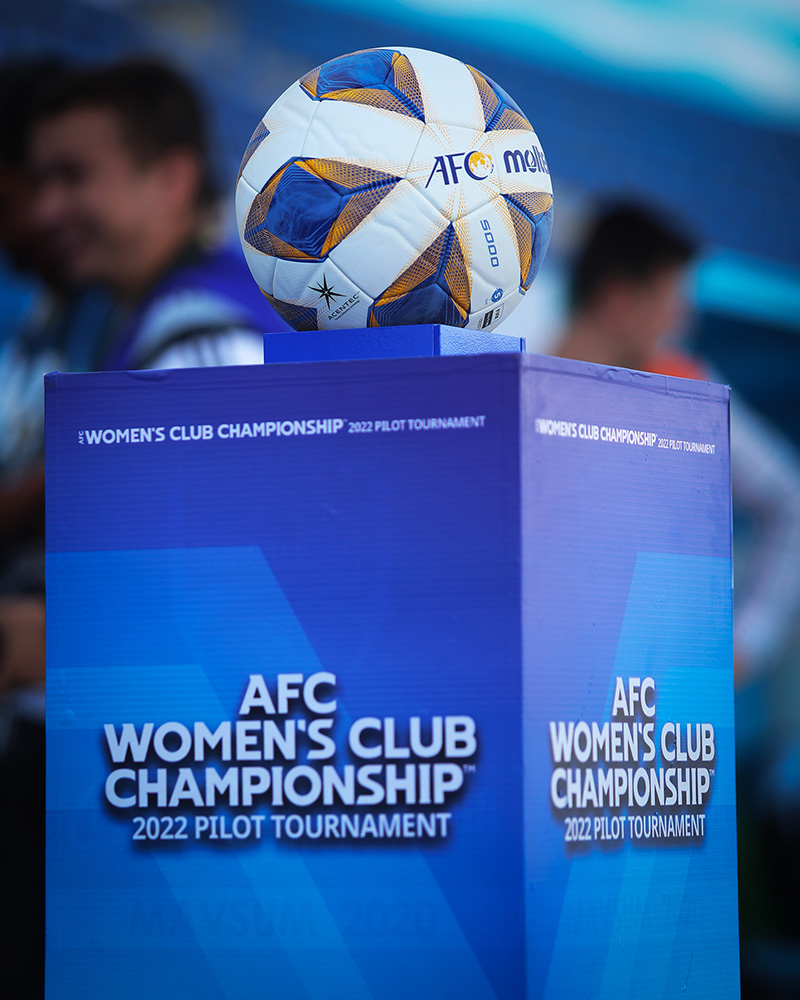

Tournament details
- Host countries: Thailand; Uzbekistan
- Dates: 15 August – 22 October 2022
- Teams: 5 (from 5 associations)

Final positions
- Champions: (Thailand) College of Asian Scholars (East) (Uzbekistan) Sogdiana Jizzakh (West) (1st title each)

Tournament statistics
- Matches played: 5
- Goals scored: 10 (2 per match)
- Attendance: 717 (143 per match)
- Top scorer(s): (Chinese Taipei) Su Yu-hsuan (2 goals)

The 2022 AFC Women's Club Championship (also known as the AFC Women's Club Championship 2022 – Pilot Tournament), held between 15 August and 22 October, was the third edition of the AFC's premier women's club football competition. Five clubs from five AFC member associations competed in this tournament. A final had been originally scheduled for 22 October, but was never played. Thailand's College of Asian Scholars won the East Zone title and Uzbekistan's Sogdiana Jizzakh won the West zone title.

== Format ==
The participating clubs were split into two regions to play a single round-robin tournament within their region at a predetermined host site. The two regional winners were to meet in a final on 22 October.

Originally planned as a seven-club tournament, Jordan's Orthodox Club withdrew on 5 August 2022.

On 15 August 2022, FIFA suspended the All India Football Federation due to undue influence from third parties, meaning Gokulam Kerala were disqualified: the two remaining clubs in the west region playing a two-legged tie at the predetermined host site.

East region
Team	Qualifying method	App. (last)
(Chinese Taipei) Taichung Blue Whale	2021 Taiwan Mulan Football League champions	1st
(Myanmar) ISPE	2018–19 Myanmar Women's League champions	1st
(Thailand) College of Asian Scholars	2021–22 Thai Women's League champions	1st

West region
Team	Qualifying method	App. (last)
~~(India) Gokulam Kerala~~	~~2021–22 Indian Women's League champions~~	~~2nd (2021)~~
(Iran) Bam Khatoon	2021–22 Kowsar League champions	1st
~~(Jordan) Orthodox~~	~~2022 Jordan Women's Football League champions~~	~~1st~~
(Uzbekistan) Sogdiana Jizzakh	2021 Uzbekistan Women's League champions	1st

== Group stage ==
=== East region ===
Pos	Team	Pld	W	D	L	GF	GA	GD	Pts	Qualification
1	(Thailand) College of Asian Scholars (H)	2	1	1	0	2	0	+2	4	Winners
2	(Chinese Taipei) Taichung Blue Whale	2	1	1	0	3	2	+1	4	
3	(Myanmar) ISPE	2	0	0	2	2	5	−3	0	

Source: AFC
(H) Hosts
15 August 2022 (Note: The ISPE v Taichung Blue Whale match was suspended after 21 minutes due to inclement weather, with the score 0–0 at the time. The match was resumed on 16 August, 10:00 UTC+7.)
18:00 UTC+7

ISPE (Myanmar)	2–3	(Chinese Taipei) Taichung Blue Whale
Khin Marlar Tun 34'; Shwe Yee Tun 57'	Report	Su Yu-hsuan 29', 61'; Silawan 33'

Chonburi Stadium, Chonburi
Attendance: 95
Referee: Nodira Mirzoeva (Tajikistan)
18 August 2022
18:00 UTC+7

College of Asian Scholars (Thailand)	2–0	(Myanmar) ISPE
Uraiporn 14'; Kanyanat 33'	Report

Chonburi Stadium, Chonburi
Attendance: 132
Referee: Cha Min-ji (South Korea)
21 August 2022
18:00 UTC+7

Taichung Blue Whale (Chinese Taipei)	0–0	(Thailand) College of Asian Scholars
	Report

Chonburi Stadium, Chonburi
Attendance: 189
Referee: Edita Mirabidova (Uzbekistan)

=== West region ===
Pos	Team	Pld	W	D	L	GF	GA	GD	Pts	Qualification
1	(Uzbekistan) Sogdiana Jizzakh (H)	2	1	1	0	2	1	+1	4	Winners
2	(Iran) Bam Khatoon	2	0	1	1	1	2	−1	1	
3	(Jordan) Orthodox	0	0	0	0	0	0	0	0	Withdrew
4	(India) Gokulam Kerala	0	0	0	0	0	0	0	0	Suspended

Source: AFC
(H) Hosts
20 August 2022
17:00 UTC+5

Bam Khatoon (Iran)	1–1	(Uzbekistan) Sogdiana Jizzakh
Ghanbari 56'	Report	Kamali 20' (o.g.)

Markaziy Stadium, Qarshi
Attendance: 78
Referee: Bùi Thị Thu Trang (Vietnam)
23 August 2022
17:00 UTC+5

Sogdiana Jizzakh (Uzbekistan)	1–0	(Iran) Bam Khatoon
Kurbonova 32'	Report

Markaziy Stadium, Qarshi
Attendance: 223
Referee: Veronika Bernatskaia (Kyrgyzstan)

Sogdiyona Jizzak won 2–1 on aggregate.

== Goalscorers ==
As of 24 August 2022

Rank	Player	Team	MD1	MD2	MD3	Total
1	(Chinese Taipei) Su Yu-hsuan	(Chinese Taipei) Taichung Blue Whale	2			2
2	(Thailand) Kanyanat Chetthabutr	(Thailand) College of Asian Scholars		1		1
2	(Iran) Zahra Ghanbari	(Iran) Bam Khatoon	1			1
2	(Thailand) Silawan Intamee	(Chinese Taipei) Taichung Blue Whale	1			1
2	(Myanmar) Khin Marlar Tun	(Myanmar) ISPE	1			1
2	(Uzbekistan) Shahnoza Kurbonova	(Uzbekistan) Sogdiana Jizzakh		1		1
2	(Myanmar) Shwe Yee Tun	(Myanmar) ISPE	1			1
2	(Thailand) Uraiporn Yongkul	(Thailand) College of Asian Scholars		1		1

== See also ==
Continental Club Championship

- 2022 CAF Women's Champions League (Africa)
- 2022 Copa Libertadores Femenina (South America)
- 2021–22 UEFA Women's Champions League (Europe)

Regional Club Championship

- 2022 UNCAF Women's Interclub Championship (Central America)
- 2022 WAFF Women's Clubs Championship (Western Asia)
