= 2022 Myanmar Women's League =

Myanmar Women League
- Season: 2022
- Champions: ISPE
- Matches: 42
- Goals: 229 (5.45 per match)

The 2022 Myanmar Women's League was the 4th season of the Myanmar Women's League, the top Myanmar professional league for women's association football clubs, since its establishment in 2016. A total of 7 teams competed in the league, with the season beginning on 3 October 2022.

ISPE were the defending champions, having won the Myanmar Women's League title the previous season.

== League table ==
Below is the league table for 22 season.

Pos	Team	Pld	W	D	L	GF	GA	GD	Pts	Qualification
1	ISPE	12	10	1	1	80	9	+71	31	Qualification for 2023 AFC Women's Club Championship group stage
2	Thitsar Arman	12	10	1	1	46	9	+37	31	
3	Myawady	12	8	2	2	38	7	+31	26	
4	Sport & Education	12	6	0	6	22	17	+5	18	
5	YREO	12	3	0	9	30	23	+7	9	
6	Young Lionesses FC	12	3	0	9	11	49	−38	9	
7	Tanintharyi FC	12	0	0	12	2	115	−113	0	

== See also ==
- 2023 Myanmar National League
- 2023 MNL-2
