= Shahnoza Kurbonova =

Uzbekistani footballer (born 2000)

Personal information
- Full name: Shahnoza Tojimurodovna Kurbonova
- Date of birth: 1 May 2000 (age 26)
- Place of birth: Denov, Uzbekistan
- Position: Forward

Team information
- Current team: Sogdiana Jizzakh

International career^{‡}
Years	Team	Apps	(Gls)
	Uzbekistan U16		(9)
	Uzbekistan U19	13	(13)
2018	Uzbekistan	2	(2)
- ‡ National team caps and goals as of 30 April 2019

Shahnoza Kurbonova (Uzbek: Shahnoza Qurbonova; born 1 May 2000) is an Uzbekistani footballer who plays as a forward. She has been a member of the Uzbekistan women's national football team.

== International goals ==
Scores and results list Uzbekistan's goal tally first

No.	Date	Venue	Opponent	Score	Result	Competition	Ref.
1	29 November 2018	Milliy Stadium, Tashkent, Uzbekistan	Kyrgyzstan	5–0	10–0	2018 CAFA Women's Championship	
2	29 November 2018	Milliy Stadium, Tashkent, Uzbekistan	Kyrgyzstan	8–0	10–0	2018 CAFA Women's Championship	

== Honours ==
Sogdiana Jizzakh

- AFC Women's Club Championship: 2022 (West)

== See also ==
- List of Uzbekistan women's international footballers
