= 2018–19 Myanmar Women's League =

Myanmar Women League
- Season: 2018–19
- Champions: ISPE
- AFC Club Championship: ISPE
- Matches: 56
- Goals: 318 (5.68 per match)

The 2018–19 Myanmar Women's League (also known as the KBZ Bank Myanmar Women's League for sponsorship reasons) was the 3rd season of the Myanmar Women's League, the top Myanmar professional league for women's association football clubs, since its establishment in 2016. A tota of 8 teams competed in the league, with the season beginning on 3 December 2018.

Myawady were the defending champions, having won the Myanmar Women's League title the previous season.

== League table ==
Below is the league table for 2018–19 season.

Pos	Team	Pld	W	D	L	GF	GA	GD	Pts	Qualification
1	ISPE	14	12	1	1	90	7	+83	37	Qualification for 2022 AFC Women's Club Championship group stage
2	Myawady	14	11	2	1	68	8	+60	35	
3	Thitsar Arman	14	10	2	2	54	6	+48	32	
4	YREO	14	7	1	6	34	31	+3	22	
5	Sport & Education	14	5	2	7	22	41	−19	17	
6	Zwekapin United	14	5	0	9	33	33	0	15	
7	Gandamar	14	2	0	12	9	77	−68	6	
8	University	14	0	0	14	8	115	−107	0	

== See also ==
- 2019 Myanmar National League
- 2019 MNL-2
