= Alyssa Ube =

Filipino footballer

Personal information
- Full name: Alyssa Jane Amor Ube
- Date of birth: August 5, 1998 (age 28)
- Place of birth: Pasig, Philippines
- Position: Midfielder

Team information
- Current team: Yangon City
- Number: 13

College career
Years	Team	Apps	(Gls)
2016–2017	University of the Philippines		

Senior career*
Years	Team	Apps	(Gls)
2024	Manila Digger		
2025–2026	Stallion Laguna		
2025–2026	→ Ayeyawady (loan)		
2026	Ayeyawady		
2026–	Yangon City	1	(0)

International career^{‡}
2021–	Philippines	1	(0)
Medal record
Women's football
Representing the Philippines
ASEAN Women's Championship
Winner	2022 Philippines	Team
- * Club domestic league appearances and goals ‡ National team caps and goals as of May 1, 2022

Alyssa Jane Amor Ube (born August 5, 1998) is a Filipino professional footballer who plays as a midfielder for Ayeyawady and the Philippines women's national team.

== Club career ==
=== Ayeyarwady ===
In 2025, she was signed by Ayeyarwady W.F.C to become one of the two first international footballers within the Myanmar Women League,Myanmar Women League Champion with Ayeyawady WFC.

== International career ==
=== Philippines ===
Ube received her first senior call-up for the Philippines in the 2022 AFC Women's Asian Cup qualifiers. She made her senior international debut in a 2–1 win against Hong Kong.

== Honours ==
=== International ===
==== Ayeyawady W.F.C ====
- Myanmar Women League: 2025-26

==== Philippines ====
- ASEAN Women's Championship: 2022
