= May Htet Lu =

Burmese footballer (born 2003)

Personal information
- Date of birth: 28 January 2003 (age 23)
- Place of birth: Yangon, Myanmar
- Height: 1.70 m (5 ft 7 in)
- Position: Forward

Team information
- Current team: Ayeyawady
- Number: 7

College career
Years	Team	Apps	(Gls)
2023–2024	Pierce Brahmas	39	(15)

Senior career*
Years	Team	Apps	(Gls)
2025 (loan)	ISPE FC		
2025	San Fernando Valley FC		
2026–	Ayeyawady		

International career
2025–	Myanmar	12	(8)
- * Club domestic league appearances and goals

May Htet Lu (Burmese: မေထက်လူ; born 28 January 2003) is a Burmese professional women's footballer who plays as a forward.

== Early life ==
Lu was born on 28 January 2003. Growing up, she attended Network International School on Myanmar.

Following her stint there, she attended Los Angeles Pierce College in the United States, where she studied biology and lived with her grandmother.

== Club career ==
In 2025, Lu signed for Burmese side ISPE FC. The same year, she signed for American side San Fernando Valley FC.

== International career ==
Lu is a Myanmar international and has been regarded as a fan favorite. During the winter of 2025, she played for the Myanmar women's national football team at the 2025 SEA Games.

== International goals ==
No.	Date	Venue	Opponent	Score	Result	Competition
1.	20 February 2025	Dasharath Rangasala, Kathmandu, Nepal	Kyrgyzstan	3–0	5–0	2025 Vianet Championship
2.	20 February 2025	Dasharath Rangasala, Kathmandu, Nepal	Kyrgyzstan	5–0	5–0	2025 Vianet Championship
3.	23 February 2025	Dasharath Rangasala, Kathmandu, Nepal	Nepal	1–0	2–2	2025 Vianet Championship
4.	29 June 2025	Thuwunna Stadium, Yangon, Myanmar	Turkmenistan	6–0	8–0	2026 AFC Women's Asian Cup qualification
5.	5 July 2025	Thuwunna Stadium, Yangon, Myanmar	Bahrain	5–0	6–0	2026 AFC Women's Asian Cup qualification
6.	5 December 2025	IPE Chonburi Stadium, Chonburi, Thailand	Philippines	2–1	2–1	2025 SEA Games
7.	8 December 2025	IPE Chonburi Stadium, Chonburi, Thailand	Malaysia	2–0	3–0	2025 SEA Games
8.	9 June 2026	Thuwunna Stadium, Yangon, Myanmar	Thailand	1–0	1–1	2026 AYA Bank Tri-Nations Cup
