= Myanmar Women League =

- Organising body: MFF
- Founded: January 2016; 10 years ago
- Country: Myanmar
- Confederation: AFC
- Number of clubs: 10
- Level on pyramid: 1
- International cup: AFC Women's Champions League
- Current champions: Ayeyawady (2025–26)
- Most championships: Myawady W.F.C; ISPE (3 titles each)
- Top scorer: Win Theingi Tun (107)
- Broadcaster: Pyoneplay
- Website: MWL website
- Current: 2026–27

The Myanmar Women's League (MWL) (Burmese: မြန်မာ အမျိုးသမီး လိဂ်) is a Myanmar professional league for women's football, contested by 10 clubs. Since 2016 it has been sponsored by the Kanbawza Bank, and are thus billed as the KBZ Bank Women's League.

== History ==
The Myanmar Women's League (MWL) was officially established in 2016. Its creation marked a significant milestone for women's sports in the country, providing a structured and competitive environment for female athletes. The league was founded with seven teams and was sponsored by Kanbawza Bank. In its early years, the MWL saw a strong rivalry develop between its top teams. Myawady dominated the first two seasons, winning both the 2016–17 and 2017-18 titles. The competition intensified in the 2018-19 season when ISPE broke Myawady's winning streak to claim their first championship.

A new chapter in the league’s history emerged in the 2025–26 season, when Ayeyawady W.F.C. won the MWL title for the first time, highlighting the growing competitiveness and evolving balance of power within the league.

== Sponsorship ==
Period	League name	Sponsor	Brand/season
2016–2019	Myanmar Women League	KBZ Bank	KBZ Women League
2021–2025	Myanmar Women League		
2026–present	Myanmar Women League	Max Energy	Myanmar Women League

== Records ==
=== All-time table ===
Season: 2016–17 and 2026–27 — Last Update Date: 28 October 2026 (It shows the standings at the end of the 2026–27 season week 11 matches)
Rank	Team	Part.	Pld	W	D	L	GF	GA	GD	Pts
1	ISPE	8	101	70	16	15	395	84	+311	226
2	Thitsar Arman	8	101	64	17	20	301	84	+217	209
3	Myawady	8	101	58	13	30	286	109	+177	187
4	Yangon United	4	55	32	9	14	113	69	+44	105
5	Ayeyawady	3	45	28	9	8	109	41	+68	93
6	Sport & Education	4	50	24	2	24	120	104	+16	74
7	YREO	5	74	19	8	47	124	176	-52	65
8	Shan United	3	45	16	7	22	73	76	-3	55
9	Zwekapin United	3	45	12	6	27	71	124	-53	42
10	Young Lionesses	4	49	8	3	38	38	207	-169	27
11	Gandamar FC	3	34	7	3	24	26	154	-128	24
12	Yadanarbon	1	11	4	3	4	21	13	+8	15
13	Home Affairs Ministry FC	1	6	3	2	1	13	2	+11	11
14	Yangon City	2	27	0	1	26	7	107	-100	1
15	University FC	2	28	0	1	27	10	212	-202	1
16	MSPE FC	1	6	0	0	6	3	35	-32	0
17	Tanintharyi FC	1	12	0	0	12	2	115	-113	0

=== Seasonal statistics ===
Update Date - 28 October 2026
Season	Matches	Goals
2016–17	21	78
2017–18	56	287
2018–19	56	318
2022	42	229
2023	30	136
2024	63	203
2025–26	72	253
2026–27	55	208
Total	395	1.712

=== All-time top scorers ===
As of 26 June 2026

Myanmar League
Rank	Player	Period	Goals	Apps
1	(Myanmar) Win Theingi Tun	2016–2024, 2026-	115	49
2	(Myanmar) San Thaw Thaw	2020–	54	43
3	(Myanmar) Myat Noe Khin	2017–	49	
4	(Myanmar) Zin Moe Pyae	2023–	28	
5	(Myanmar) Lin Myint Mo	2022–	27	

== Champions ==
=== By season ===
Year	Winners	Runners-up	Third place	Top goalscorer	
Year	Winners	Runners-up	Third place	Player	Goals
2016–17	Myawady	Thitsar Arman			
2017–18	Myawady	Thitsar Arman	Sport & Education	(Myanmar) Win Theingi Tun (Myawady)	41
2018–19	ISPE	Myawady	Thitsar Arman	(Myanmar) Ye Ye Oo (ISPE)	14
2022	ISPE	Thitsar Arman	Myawady	(Myanmar) Khin Marlar Tun (ISPE)	18
2023	Myawady	ISPE	Thitsar Arman	(Myanmar) San Thaw Thaw (Myawady) (Myanmar) Khin Marlar Tun (ISPE)	16
2024	ISPE	Yangon United	Ayeyawady	(Myanmar) San Thaw Thaw (Ayeyawady)	15
2025–26	Ayeyawady	ISPE	Thitsar Arman	(Myanmar) Zin Moe Pyae (Yangon United)	22
2026–27					

=== By club ===
Club	Winners	Runners-up	Years won	Years runners-up
ISPE	3	2	2018–19, 2022, 2024	2023, 2025–26
Myawady	3	1	2016–17, 2017–18, 2023	2018–19
Ayeyawady	1	0	2025–26	
Thitsar Arman	0	3		2016–17, 2017–18, 2022
Yangon United	0	1		2024

== Player statistics ==
- Youngest player: Nant Shin That Phyu Sin Pyone (Ayeyawady) — 14 years
- Oldest player: Khin Marlar Tun (ISPE) — 36 years
- Youngest scorer: Nant Shin That Phyu Sin Pyone (Ayeyawady) — 15 years 1 month 11 days (17 July 2025, Shan United 1–2 Ayeyawady, 2024 Myanmar Women's League)
- Oldest scorer: Khin Marlar Tun (ISPE) — 36 years 3 months 5 days (26 December 2025, ISPE 3-0 Myawady, 2025–26 Myanmar Women's League)
- Longest clean sheet: Myo Mya Mya Nyein (600 minutes, 2025-26 Myanmar Women's League)
- Most goals in a season: 41 — Win Theingi Tun (Myawady W.F.C, 2017-18)
- Most titles won: 3 titles (May Zin Nwe, Khin Marlar Tun)

== Awards ==
=== Top scorer ===
Year	Player	Club	Goals
2017-18	(Myanmar) Win Theingi Tun	Myawady	41
2018–19	(Myanmar) Ye Ye Oo	ISPE	14
2022	(Myanmar) Khin Marlar Tun	ISPE	18
2023	(Myanmar) San Thaw Thaw	Myawady	16
2023	(Myanmar) Khin Marlar Tun	ISPE	16
2024	(Myanmar) San Thaw Thaw	Ayeyawady W.F.C	19
2024	(Myanmar) Lin Myint Mo	ISPE	19
2025–26	(Myanmar) Zin Moe Pyae	Yangon United W.F.C	22

=== Player of the season ===
Year	Player	Club
2017-18	(Myanmar) Win Theingi Tun	Myawady
2018–19	(Myanmar)	ISPE
2022	(Myanmar)
2023	(Myanmar) San Thaw Thaw	Myawady
2024	(Myanmar) San Thaw Thaw	Ayeyawady W.F.C.
2025–26	(Myanmar) Phyu Phyu Win	Ayeyawady W.F.C.

=== Golden Glove ===
Year	Player	Club	Matches
2017–18	(Myanmar) May Zin Nwe	Myawady	12
2018–19	(Myanmar)	Thitsar Arman W.F.C.
2022	(Myanmar) May Zin Nwe	Myawady	6
2022	(Myanmar) Myo Mya Mya Nyein	Thitsar Arman W.F.C	6
2023	(Myanmar) May Zin Nwe	Myawady	5
2023	(Myanmar) Htet Eaindra Lin	ISPE	5
2024	(Myanmar) Phee Bay	Yangon United	7
2025–26	(Myanmar) Ei Sandar Zaw	Ayeyawady	9

== Finance system ==
In 2026, a Ranking Subsidy System is introduced with the aim of increasing competitiveness and enhancing the performance of clubs. Under this system, financial subsidies will be distributed to clubs based on their positions at the end of the season.

== Sponsorship ==
=== Main sponsor ===
- Max Energy

=== Official partners ===
- Shwe Li Yadanar Estate
- BYD
- AYA Pay
- J'Donut
- Pro 1 Global
- Ocean Supercenter
- Coral Agri
- Hey Pay
- PUMA Energy Drink
- Dong Luc
- Alpine Drinking Water

== See also ==
- Myanmar Football Federation
- Myanmar National League
- Myanmar National League Cup
- Charity Cup
- MNL-2
