= Naw Htet Htet Wai =

Burmese footballer

Personal information
- Date of birth: 30 July 2000 (age 26)
- Place of birth: Myebon, Myanmar
- Height: 1.57 m (5 ft 2 in)
- Position: Midfielder

Team information
- Current team: Ayeyawady
- Number: 6

Senior career*
| Years | Team | Apps | (Gls) |
| 2020–2021 | YREO W.F.C | | |
| 2022–2024 | Myawady W.F.C | | |
| 2024– | Ayeyawady | | |

International career^{‡}
| 2019 | Myanmar U19 | 9 | (0) |
| 2021– | Myanmar | 28 | (1) |
- * Club domestic league appearances and goals as of 25 September 2023 ‡ National team caps and goals as of 30 Sep 2023

Naw Htet Htet Wai (Burmese: နော်ထက်ထက်ဝေ; born 30 July 2000) is a Burmese footballer who plays as a midfielder for Myawady W.F.C. and the Myanmar women's national team.

Scores and results list Myanmar's goal tally first, score column indicates score after each Naw Htet Htet Wai goal.

List of international goals scored by Naw Htet Htet Wai
| No. | Date | Venue | Opponent | Score | Result | Competition |
|---|---|---|---|---|---|---|
| 1. | 6 May 2023 | RCAF Old Stadium, Phnom Penh | Vietnam | 1–1 | 1–3 | 2023 Southeast Asian Games |

== Honours ==
Myanmar

- Southeast Asian Games silver medal: 2023

Myawady

- Myanmar Women League: 2023

Ayeyawady

- Myanmar Women League: 2025-26
