= 2017–18 Myanmar Women's League =

Myanmar Women League
- Season: 2018
- Champions: Myawady
- Matches: 56
- Goals: 287 (5.13 per match)

The 2017–18 Myanmar Women's League (also known as the KBZ Bank Myanmar Women's League for sponsorship reasons) was the 2nd season of the Myanmar Women's League, the top Myanmar professional league for women's association football clubs, since its establishment in 2016. A total of 8 teams will compete in the league. The season began on 29 December 2017. Fixtures for the 2017–18 season were announced on 25 December 2017.

Myawady are the defending champions, having won the Myanmar Women's League title the previous season.

== League table ==
Below is the league table for 2017–18 season.

Pos	Team	Pld	W	D	L	GF	GA	GD	Pts
1	Myawady	14	13	1	0	78	3	+75	40
2	Thitsar Arman	14	12	1	1	66	6	+60	37
3	Sport & Education	14	10	0	4	64	14	+50	30
4	Zwekapin United	14	4	4	6	18	32	−14	16
5	YREO	14	4	3	7	31	38	−7	15
6	ISPE	14	3	2	9	19	37	−18	11
7	Gandamar	14	3	2	9	9	60	−51	11
8	University	14	0	1	13	2	97	−95	1

== Matches ==
Fixtures and Results of the 2017–18 National League 2 season.

=== Week 1 ===
2017-12-27	Thitsar Arman	1–1	Myawady	Aung San Stadium, Yangon
16:00 UTC+06:30	Naw Ar Lo Wer Phaw 84'		Win Theingi Tun 68'

2017-12-28	Sport & Education	9–0	University	Aung San Stadium, Yangon
16:00 UTC+06:30	Khin malar Tun 18', 24', 28', 49', 86'; Yee Yee Oo 12', 25'; Thin Thin Yu 70'; Zin Zin Naing 90'

2017-12-29	ISPE	0–0	YREO	Aung San Stadium, Yangon
16:00 UTC+06:30

2017-12-30	Gandamar	0–5	Zwekapin	Aung San Stadium, Yangon
16:00 UTC+06:30			Sandar Htwe 22', 79'; San San Thaw 43', 83'; Than Than Htwe 74'

=== Week 2 ===
2018-1-2	Sport & Education	6–0	ISPE	Aung San Stadium, Yangon
16:00 UTC+06:30	Yee Yee Oo 25', 66'; Khin Marlar Tun 45+1', 83'; Nan May Thazin 74'

2018-1-3	Myawady	3–0	YREO	Aung San Stadium, Yangon
16:00 UTC+06:30

2018-1-4	University	0–4	Zwekapin	Aung San Stadium, Yangon
16:00 UTC+06:30			Sandar Htwe 22', 79'; San San Thaw 43', 83'; Than Than Htwe 74'

2018-1-5	Thitsar Arman	5–0	Gandamar	Aung San Stadium, Yangon
16:00 UTC+06:30	Naw Ar Lo Wer Phaw 3'; Khin Moe Wai 38', 66'; Nilar Win 61', 64'

=== Week 3 ===
2018-1-9	Zwekapin	1–10	Thitsar Arman	Aung San Stadium, Yangon
16:00 UTC+06:30	Than Than Htwe 44'		Khin Moe Wai 8', 10', 20', 54', 55', 67', 90'; July Kyaw 12', 14'; Nilar Win 24'	Player of the Match: Khin Moe Wai / FW (Thitsar Arman)

2018-1-10	YREO	12–0	University	Aung San Stadium, Yangon
16:00 UTC+06:30	Myat Noe Khin 3', 27', 29', 41', 49', 56', 69', 85'; Nwe Ni Win 55' (pen.); Swe Mar Aung 64', 72'; Bawe Lyan Kane 66'			Player of the Match: Myat Noe Khin / FW (YREO)

2018-1-11	ISPE	0–2	Myawady	Aung San Stadium, Yangon
16:00 UTC+06:30			WIn Theingi Tun 47', 80'	Player of the Match: Khine Zar Win / GK (ISPE)

2018-1-12	Gandamar	0–3	Sport & Education	Aung San Stadium, Yangon
16:00 UTC+06:30			Yee Yee Oo 16', 40'; Khin Marlar Tun 24'	Player of the Match: Khin Marlar Tun / FW (Sport & Education)

=== Week 4 ===
2018-1-16	YREO	4–1	Gandamar	Aung San Stadium, Yangon
16:00 UTC+06:30	Myat Noe Khin 63', 65', 74'; Nwe Ni Win 80'		Tint Tint Tun 90'	Player of the Match: Myat Noe Khin / FW (YREO)

2018-1-17	University	0–8	ISPE	Aung San Stadium, Yangon
16:00 UTC+06:30			Moe Moe Than 7', 23', 32'; May Phu Ko 53'; Shwe Yee Tun 16', 48'; Khin San Di 71', 84'	Player of the Match: Shwe Yee Tun / FW (ISPE)

2018-1-18	Thitsar Arman	3–2	Sport & Education	Aung San Stadium, Yangon
16:00 UTC+06:30	Khine Mar Oo 52'; Khin Moe Wai 56'; Naw Ar Lo Wer Phaw 80'		Yee Yee Oo 38', 42' (pen.)	Player of the Match: Khin Mo Mo Tun / MF (Thitsar Arman)

2018-1-12	Zwekapin	0–3	Myawady	Aung San Stadium, Yangon
16:00 UTC+06:30			Win Theigi Tun 17', 90' (pen.); Yupar Khaing 55'	Player of the Match: Win Theingi Tun / FW (Myaway)

=== Week 5 ===
2018-1-23	Myawady	2–0	Sport & Education	Aung San Stadium, Yangon
16:00 UTC+06:30	Win Theingi Tun 31', 75'			Player of the Match: Win Theingi Tun / FW (Myawady)

2018-1-24	ISPE	0–6	Thitsar Arman	Aung San Stadium, Yangon
16:00 UTC+06:30			Khine Mar Oo 13'; Nilar WIn 17', 83'; Khin Moe Wai 38', 90'; July Kyaw 87'	Player of the Match: Nilar Win / MF (Thitsar Arman)

2018-1-25	Gandamar	2–2	University	Aung San Stadium, Yangon
16:00 UTC+06:30	Tint Tint Tun 45+1'; Niang Zann Nuam 48'		Mie Mie Lin 44'; Aye Aye Thant 74'	Player of the Match: Moe Moe San / GK (University)

2018-1-26	Zwekapin	2–2	YREO	Aung San Stadium, Yangon
16:00 UTC+06:30	San Thaw Thaw 28'; Zin Mar Tun 45'		Myat Noe Khin 14'; Zin Mar Htwe 32'	Player of the Match: Nwe Ni Win / MF (YREO)

=== Week 6 ===
2018-1-31	University	0–15	Myawady	Aung San Stadium, Yangon
15:30 UTC+06:30			Win Theigi Tun 7', 11', 14', 17', 19', 48', 68', 76', 86'; Yu Par Khing 52', 60', 81', 88'; Khaing Tha Zin 40', 85'

2018-2-1	Thitsar Arman	6–0	YREO	Aung San Stadium, Yangon
16:00 UTC+06:30	Khin Moe Wai 11', 22', 87'; Naw Arlo War Phaw 43', 70'; Phyu Hnin Htwe 72'

2018-2-2	Sport & Education	4–0	Zwekapin United	Aung San Stadium, Yangon
16:00 UTC+06:30	Nu Nu 44', 60', 62'; Yi Yi Oo 75'

2018-2-3	ISPE	0–1	Gandamar	Aung San Stadium, Yangon
16:00 UTC+06:30			Khin Zar Zar Win 40'

=== Week 7 ===
2018-2-6	YREO	0–7	Sport & Education	Aung San Stadium, Yangon
15:30 UTC+06:30			Ye Ye Oo 2', 52' (pen.), 75' (pen.), 81', 83'; Shwe Moe Aye 54'; Kay Zin Myint 85'

2018-2-7	University	0–6	Thitsar Arman	Aung San Stadium, Yangon
16:00 UTC+06:30			Nilar Win 8', 43', 71'; Naw Arlo Wer Phaw 11'; Khin Mo Mo Tun 30'; July Kyaw 55'

2018-2-8	Myawady	20–0	Gandamar	Aung San Stadium, Yangon
15:30 UTC+06:30	Win Theigi Tun 3', 40', 43', 48', 49', 50', 67', 73', 83'; Yuper Khaing 7', 35', 53', 56', 58', 79', 87'; Hla Yin Win 6', 37'; Mi Sett 33'; O.G 52' (o.g)

2018-2-9	Zwekapin United	1–1	ISPE	Aung San Stadium, Yangon
16:00 UTC+06:30	Sandar Htwe 79'		Khin Myo Wai 59' (pen.)

=== Week 8 ===
2018-3-28	Sport & Education	6–1	YREO	Aung San Stadium, Yangon
16:00 UTC+06:30	Yee Yee Oo 6', 15', 71', 84'; Khin Malar Tun 8'; Kay Zin Myint 52'		May Thawe Ko 30'

2018-3-29	Gandamar	0–9	Myawady	Aung San Stadium, Yangon
16:00 UTC+06:30			Win Theigi Tun 22', 26', 32', 46', 55'; Khin Than Wai 25'; Hla Yin Win 47'; Zin Mar Tun 52'; Yuper Khaing 85'

2018-3-30	ISPE	0–1	Zwekapin	Aung San Stadium, Yangon
15:30 UTC+06:30			Lae Lae Hlaing 30'

2018-3-31	Thitsar Arman	9–0	University	Aung San Stadium, Yangon
16:00 UTC+06:30	Khin Moe Wai 17', 30', 57', 89'; Yamin Lwin 54'; Nilar Win 25'; Naw Ar Lo Wer Phaw 39'; July Kyaw 45', 55'

=== Week 9 ===
2018-4-3	ISPE	0–13	Sport & Education	Aung San Stadium, Yangon
16:00 UTC+06:30			Khinmalar Tun 20', 51', 73'; Yee Yee Oo 4', 8', 25', 55'; Shwe Moe Aye 3', 17', 27'; Nu Nu 59', 78'; Thin Thin Yu 66'

2018-4-4	YREO	0–6	Myawady	Aung San Stadium, Yangon
16:00 UTC+06:30			Win Theigi Tun 25', 52', 84', 90+1', 90+2'; Aye Myo Myat 46'

2018-4-5	Zwekapin	3–0	University	Aung San Stadium, Yangon
16:00 UTC+06:30	Lae Lae Hlaing 70', 81'; Than Than Htwe 90+1'		Lae Lae Hlaing 30'

2018-4-6	Gandamar	0–7	Thitsar Arman	Aung San Stadium, Yangon
16:00 UTC+06:30			July Kyaw 18', 37', 70'; Khin Moe Wai 27'; Nilar Myint 4'; Naw Ar Lo Wer Phaw 52', 58'

=== Week 10 ===
2018-7-17	Thit Sar Ar man	3–0	Zwekapin	Aung San Stadium, Yangon
16:00 UTC+06:30	Khin Moe Wai 56'; Naw Ar Lo War Phaw 67'; Khin Mo Mo Tun 92'

2018-7-18	University	0–8	YREO	Aung San Stadium, Yangon
16:00 UTC+06:30			Nwe Ni Win 31', 40', 89'; Myat Noe Khin 17', 53'; Zin Mar Htwe 16', 36'; Win Sandar Tun 45+1'

2018-7-19	Myawady	2–0	ISPE	Aung San Stadium, Yangon
16:00 UTC+06:30	May Sable Phoo 47'; Win Theingi Tun 83'

2018-7-20	Sport & Education	3–0	Gandamar	Aung San Stadium, Yangon
16:00 UTC+06:30	Nant May Thazin 28'; Ye Ye Oo 32'; Thin Thin Yu 45+2'

=== Week 11 ===
2018-7-24	Gandamar	1–0	YREO	Aung San Stadium, Yangon
15:30 UTC+06:30	Khin Zar Zar Win 72'

2018-7-25	ISPE	7–0	University	Aung San Stadium, Yangon
15:30 UTC+06:30	Shwe Yee Tun 26', 28'; May Phu Ko 61', 75', 43'; May Htay Lwin 55'; Thinzar Cho 87'

2018-7-26	Sport & Education	0–3	Thit Sar Ar Man	Aung San Stadium, Yangon
15:30 UTC+06:30			Nilar Win 34'; Khin Moe Wai 47'; July Kyaw 82'

2018-7-27	Myawady	5-0	Zwekapin	Aung San Stadium, Yangon
15:30 UTC+06:30	Win Theingi Tun 37', 69', 83'; Khaing Thazin 45'; Own Goal 90+3'

=== Week 12 ===
2018-7-31	Sport & Education	v	Myawady	Aung San Stadium, Yangon
15:30 UTC+06:30

2018-8-1	Thitsar Arman	v	ISPE	Aung San Stadium, Yangon
15:30 UTC+06:30

2018-8-2	University	0–4	Gandamar	Aung San Stadium, Yangon
15:30 UTC+06:30			Ei Sandar Zaw 19', 24', 87'; Thin Thin Maw 26'

2018-8-3	YREO	0–0	Zwekapin	Aung San Stadium, Yangon
15:30 UTC+06:30

=== Week 13 ===
2018-8-7	Gandamar	0–2	ISPE	Aung San Stadium, Yangon
15:30 UTC+06:30			May Phu Ko 34'; Shwe Yee Htun 82'

2018-8-8	Myawady	6–0	University	Aung San Stadium, Yangon
15:30 UTC+06:30	Win Theingi Tun 14', 73'; Yu Par Khaing 25', 52'; May Thu Kyaw 40', 42'

2018-8-9	YREO	1–5	Thitsar Arman	Aung San Stadium, Yangon
15:30 UTC+06:30	Aye Aye Htwe 55'		Khin Moe Wai 24', 35', 74', 78'; Nilar Win 90'

2018-8-10	Zwekapin	1–5	Sports & Education	Aung San Stadium, Yangon
15:30 UTC+06:30	San Thaw Thaw 80'		Wai Wai Aung 42'; Yee Yee Oo 74', 84'; Khin Marlar Tun 19'; Nu Nu 59'

=== Week 14 ===
2018-8-14	University	0–4	Sports & Education	Aung San Stadium, Yangon
15:30 UTC+06:30			Su Nandar Lwin 5'; Yi Yi Oo 16', 86'; Thin Thin Yu 86'

2018-8-15	YREO	3–1	ISPE	Aung San Stadium, Yangon
15:30 UTC+06:30	Myat Noe Khin 28', 69', 70'		Zin Moe Htet 19'

2018-8-24	Zwekapin	0–0	Gandamar	Aung San Stadium, Yangon
15:30 UTC+06:30

2018-8-29	Myawady	2-0	Thitsar Arman	Aung San Stadium, Yangon
15:30 UTC+06:30	May Thu Kyaw 22'; Yu Par Khaing 81'

== Season statistics ==
=== Top scorers ===
Rank	Player	Club	Goals
1	(Myanmar) Win Theingi Tun	Myawady	44
2	(Myanmar) Yee Yee Oo	Sport & Education	24
3	(Myanmar) Khin Moe Wai	Thitsar Arman	24
4	(Myanmar) Naw Ar Lo Wer Phaw	Thitsar Arman	16
5	(Myanmar) Yupar Khaing	Myawady	15
6	(Myanmar) Myat Noe Khin	YREO	13
7	(Myanmar) Khin Marlar Tun	Sport and Education	12
8	(Myanmar) Nilar Win	Thitsar Arman	11
9	(Myanmar) July Kyaw	Thitsar Arman	10
10	(Myanmar) Sandar Htwe		7

== See also ==
- 2018 Myanmar National League
- 2018 National League 2
