= Football at the 2023 SEA Games – Women's tournament =

2023 SEA Games Women's Football Tournament
Tournament details
- Host country: Cambodia
- Dates: 3–15 May
- Teams: 8 (from 8 associations)
- Venue: 3 (in 1 host city)

Final positions
- Champions: Vietnam (8th title)
- Runners-up: Myanmar
- Third place: Thailand
- Fourth place: Cambodia

Tournament statistics
- Matches played: 16
- Goals scored: 55 (3.44 per match)
- Top scorer(s): (Thailand) Jiraporn Mongkoldee (6 goals)

The women's football tournament at the 2023 SEA Games was held from 3–15 May 2023 in Cambodia. Eight Southeast Asian nations participated in the women's tournament. All matches are played in Phnom Penh. There is no age limit for this tournament. Indonesia withdrew from the competition after the draw. Timor-Leste did not take part in the competition.

Vietnam made history by becoming the first nation to win the tournament four times in a row, and eight times in total, successfully defending their titles in 2017, 2019, and 2021, by beating Myanmar 2–0 in the final.

== Competition schedule ==
The following is the competition schedule for the football competitions:

G	Group stage	½	Semifinals	B	3rd place play-off	F	Final

Event	Sat 29	Sun 30	Mon 1	Tue 2	Wed 3	Thu 4	Fri 5	Sat 6	Sun 7	Mon 8	Tue 9	Wed 10	Thu 11	Fri 12	Sat 13	Sun 14	Mon 15		Tue 16
Women					G			G			G			½			B	F	

== Venues ==
Three venues were used during the tournament. Olympic Stadium hosted the Bronze medal match and the Gold medal Match.

Football at the 2023 SEA Games – Women's tournament (Cambodia)
Football at the 2023 SEA Games – Women's tournament (Cambodia)	RCAF Old Stadium	RSN Stadium	Olympic Stadium
Football at the 2023 SEA Games – Women's tournament (Cambodia)	Capacity: 8,000	Capacity: 5,000	Capacity: 50,000

== Participating nations ==
- Cambodia (host)
- Indonesia (W)
- Laos
- Malaysia
- Myanmar
- Philippines
- Singapore
- Thailand
- Vietnam

== Draw ==
The draw for the tournament was held on 5 April 2023 at the Morodok Techo National Stadium. 9 teams were seeded into five pots based on their performance in the 2021 edition. The hosts were allocated in Pot 1. Indonesia withdrew after the draw.

Pot 1	Pot 2	Pot 3	Pot 4	Pot 5
Cambodia (H); Vietnam (C)	Thailand; Philippines	Myanmar; Singapore	Laos	~~Indonesia~~ (W); Malaysia

== Squads ==
Unlike the men's tournament which is an under-22 international tournament, the women's football tournament is for senior national teams.

== Group stage ==
- All times are Cambodia Standard Time (UTC+7).

=== Group A ===
Pos	Team	Pld	W	D	L	GF	GA	GD	Pts	Qualification
1	Vietnam	3	2	0	1	7	3	+4	6	Advance to Semi-finals
2	Myanmar	3	2	0	1	7	4	+3	6	Advance to Semi-finals
3	Philippines	3	2	0	1	3	2	+1	6	
4	Malaysia	3	0	0	3	1	9	−8	0	
5	Indonesia	0	0	0	0	0	0	0	0	Withdrew

Source: FIFA
3 May 2023
16:00

Vietnam	3–0	Malaysia
Phạm Hải Yến 5'; Nguyễn Thị Bích Thùy 24'; Jaciah 34' (o.g.)

RCAF Old Stadium, Phnom Penh
Attendance: 1,806
3 May 2023
20:00

Philippines	0–1	Myanmar
		Win Theingi Tun 90' (pen.)

RCAF Old Stadium, Phnom Penh
Attendance: 847
Referee: Lara Lee (Australia)

6 May 2023
16:00

Myanmar	1–3	Vietnam
Naw Htet Htet Wai 42'		Huỳnh Như 10'; Nguyễn Thị Thanh Nhã 76'; Trần Thị Thùy Trang 89'

RCAF Old Stadium, Phnom Penh
Attendance: 1,568
6 May 2023
20:00

Malaysia	0–1	Philippines
		Bolden 90+8'

RCAF Old Stadium, Phnom Penh
Attendance: 1,126

9 May 2023
16:00

Vietnam	1–2	Philippines
Nguyễn Thị Bích Thùy 40'		Bolden 12' (pen.); Long 82'

RSN Stadium, Phnom Penh
Attendance: 1,658
9 May 2023
16:00

Myanmar	5–1	Malaysia
July Kyaw 3', 40'; Khin Marlar Tun 27'; San Thaw Thaw 62', 83'		Intan 59'

RCAF Old Stadium, Phnom Penh
Attendance: 432
Referee: Ranjita Devi Tekcham (India)

=== Group B ===
Pos	Team	Pld	W	D	L	GF	GA	GD	Pts	Qualification
1	Thailand	3	3	0	0	13	0	+13	9	Advance to Semi-finals
2	Cambodia (H)	3	2	0	1	3	3	0	6	Advance to Semi-finals
3	Singapore	3	1	0	2	2	6	−4	3	
4	Laos	3	0	0	3	1	10	−9	0	

Source: FIFA
(H) Hosts
3 May 2023
16:00

Thailand	4–0	Singapore
Saowalak 5'; Orapin 18'; Nipawan 28'; Jiraporn 66'

RSN Stadium, Phnom Penh
Attendance: 931
3 May 2023
20:00

Cambodia	2–0	Laos
Yoeurn 10', 37'

RSN Stadium, Phnom Penh
Attendance: 4,530

6 May 2023
16:00

Laos	0–6	Thailand
		Jiraporn 9', 40', 90+6'; Saowalak 19'; Thanchanok 54'; Orapin 65'

RSN Stadium, Phnom Penh
Attendance: 1,028
6 May 2023
20:00

Singapore	0–1	Cambodia
		Kunthea 76' (pen.)

RSN Stadium, Phnom Penh
Attendance: 4,725
Referee: Mahnaz Zokaee (Iran)

9 May 2023
20:00

Singapore	2–1	Laos
Nicole Lim 45+2'; Izzati 61'		Dalavone 90'

RCAF Old Stadium, Phnom Penh
Attendance: 364
9 May 2023
20:00

Cambodia	0–3	Thailand
		Panittha 23'; Nualanong 45+2'; Jiraporn 90+3'

RSN Stadium, Phnom Penh
Attendance: 5,525

== Knockout stage ==
Semi-finals
12 May – Phnom Penh
Vietnam	4
Cambodia	0
12 May – Phnom Penh
Thailand	2
Myanmar	4

Gold medal match
15 May – Phnom Penh
Vietnam	2
Myanmar	0
Bronze medal match
15 May – Phnom Penh
Cambodia	0
Thailand	6

=== Semi-finals ===
12 May 2023
19:00

Vietnam	4–0	Cambodia
Ngân Thị Vạn Sự 20'; Phạm Hải Yến 30'; Trần Thị Thùy Trang 36' (pen.); Huỳnh Như 90+3' (pen.)

Olympic Stadium, Phnom Penh
Attendance: 9,849
Referee: Mahnaz Zokaee (Iran)
12 May 2023
19:00

Thailand	2–4	Myanmar
Saowalak 10'; Orapin 18'		Yu Per Khine 43'; Win Theingi Tun 48'; San Thaw Thaw 52'; Myat Noe Khin 90+2'

RCAF Old Stadium, Phnom Penh
Attendance: 607
Referee: Lara Lee (Australia)

=== Bronze medal match ===
15 May 2023
16:00

Cambodia	0–6	Thailand
		Saowalak 16', 33'; Jiraporn 25'; Panittha 52'; Pattaranan 54', 88'

Olympic Stadium, Phnom Penh
Attendance: 1,107
Referee: Tian Jin (China)

=== Gold medal match ===
15 May 2023
19:30

Vietnam	2–0	Myanmar
Huỳnh Như 12'; Nguyễn Thị Thanh Nhã 75'

Olympic Stadium, Phnom Penh
Attendance: 5,063
Referee: Plong Pichakara (Cambodia)

== Goalscorers ==
There were 55 goals scored in 16 matches, for an average of 3.44 goals per match.

6 goals

- (Thailand) Jiraporn Mongkoldee

5 goals

- (Thailand) Saowalak Peng-ngam

3 goals

- (Myanmar) San Thaw Thaw
- (Thailand) Orapin Waenngoen
- (Vietnam) Huỳnh Như

2 goals

- (Cambodia) Yon Yoeurn
- (Myanmar) July Kyaw
- (Myanmar) Win Theingi Tun
- (Philippines) Sarina Bolden
- (Thailand) Panittha Jeeratanapavibul
- (Thailand) Pattaranan Aupachai
- (Vietnam) Nguyễn Thị Bích Thùy
- (Vietnam) Nguyễn Thị Thanh Nhã
- (Vietnam) Phạm Hải Yến
- (Vietnam) Trần Thị Thùy Trang

1 goal

- (Cambodia) Poeurn Kunthea
- (Laos) Dalavone Sophabmixay
- (Malaysia) Intan Sarah
- (Myanmar) Khin Marlar Tun
- (Myanmar) Myat Noe Khin
- (Myanmar) Naw Htet Htet Wai
- (Myanmar) Yu Per Khine
- (Philippines) Hali Long
- (Singapore) Nicole Lim
- (Singapore) Nur Izzati Rosni
- (Thailand) Nipawan Panyosuk
- (Thailand) Nualanong Muensri
- (Thailand) Thanchanok Jansri
- (Vietnam) Ngân Thị Vạn Sự

1 own goal

- (Malaysia) Jaciah Jumilis (against Vietnam)

== Final ranking ==
Pos	Team	Pld	W	D	L	GF	GA	GD	Pts	Final result
1	Vietnam	5	4	0	1	13	3	+10	12	Gold Medal
2	Myanmar	5	3	0	2	11	8	+3	9	Silver Medal
3	Thailand	5	4	0	1	21	4	+17	12	Bronze Medal
4	Cambodia (H)	5	2	0	3	3	13	−10	6	Fourth place
5	Philippines	3	2	0	1	3	2	+1	6	Eliminated in group stage
6	Singapore	3	1	0	2	2	6	−4	3	Eliminated in group stage
7	Malaysia	3	0	0	3	1	9	−8	0	Eliminated in group stage
8	Laos	3	0	0	3	1	10	−9	0	Eliminated in group stage
9	Indonesia	0	0	0	0	0	0	0	0	Withdrew

(H) Hosts

== See also ==
- Football at the 2023 SEA Games – Men's tournament
