= Kousar Kamali =

Iranian footballer (born 1995)

Personal information
- Full name: Kousar Kamali
- Date of birth: 21 February 1995 (age 31)
- Place of birth: Babol, Iran
- Position: Defender

Team information
- Current team: Sepahan Isfahan
- Number: 11

Senior career*
| Years | Team | Apps | (Gls) |
- Sepahan Isfahan

International career^{‡}
| 2009 | Iran U14 | | (0) |
| 2010 | Iran U16 | 1+ | (0) |
| 2012 | Iran U19 | | (0) |
| 2013–2017 | Iran | 6 | (0) |
- * Club domestic league appearances and goals ‡ National team caps and goals as of 11 April 2017

Kousar Kamali (Persian: کوثر کمالی; born 21 February 1995) is an Iranian footballer who plays as a defender for Kowsar Women Football League club Sepahan SC. She has been a member of the Iran women's national team.

== Personal life ==
On 31 January 2026, Kamali withdrew from the national team in protest of the authorities' handling of the 2025–2026 Iranian protests, writing on her Instagram: "...when the heart is wounded and the soul is tired, football is no longer a refuge."
