= Phyu Phyu Win =

Burmese footballer

Personal information
- Date of birth: 1 December 2004 (age 21)
- Place of birth: Yangon, Myanmar
- Height: 1.65 m (5 ft 5 in)
- Position: Defender

Team information
- Current team: Ayeyawady
- Number: 5

Senior career*
Years	Team	Apps	(Gls)
2018–2021	YREO	64	(0)
2022–2024	Myawady W.F.C.		
2025–	Ayeyawady	16	(11)
2025	→ ISPE W.F.C (loan)	3	(6)

International career^{‡}
2018–2021	Myanmar U16	18	(0)
2019–2023	Myanmar U19	31	(0)
2019–	Myanmar	51	(1)
- * Club domestic league appearances and goals ‡ National team caps and goals as of 30 September 2023

Phyu Phyu Win (Burmese: ဖြူဖြူဝင်း; born 1 December 2004) is a Burmese professional footballer who plays as a defender for Ayeyawady and the Myanmar women's national team.

== Honours ==
–Phyu Phyu Win Honours
Team	Competition	Title	Seasons	Runners-up	Runners-up seasons	Third Place	Third Place Seasons
Myawady W.F.C	Myanmar Women League	1	2023	0	0	0	0
Ayeyawady W.F.C	Myanmar Women League	1	2025-26	0	0	0	0

== International ==
Appearances and goals by national team and year
National team	Year	Apps	Goals
Myanmar	2018	10	0
Myanmar	2019	11	0
Myanmar	2020	1	0
Myanmar	2021	3	0
Myanmar	2022	13	0
Myanmar	2023	13	1
Total		51	1

=== Internationals goals and apps ===
– Internationals goals and apps
Team	Internationals	Goals	apps
Myawady W.F.C	AFC Women's Champions League	0	3
ISPE W.F.C	AFC Women's Champions League	3	6
Ayeyawady	AFC Women's Champions League	1	3

Scores and results list Myanmar's goal tally first, score column indicates score after each Phyu Phyu Win goal.

List of international goals scored by Phyu Phyu Win
No.	Date	Venue	Opponent	Score	Result	Competition
1.	12 May 2023	RCAF Old Stadium, Phnom Penh	Thailand	3–2	4–2	2023 Southeast Asian Games
