= Ei Sandar Zaw =

Myanmar footballer (born 2005)

Personal information
- Full name: Ei Sandar Zaw
- Date of birth: 15 February 2000 (age 26)
- Place of birth: Yangon, Myanmar
- Height: 1.65 m (5 ft 5 in)
- Position: Goalkeeper

Team information
- Current team: Ayeyawady
- Number: 1

Senior career*
Years	Team	Apps	(Gls)
2023–	Ayeyawady	29	(0)

International career
2025–	Myanmar	3	(0)
- * Club domestic league appearances and goals

Ei Sandar Zaw (Burmese: အိစန္ဒာဇော်; born 15 February 2000) is a Burmese women's professional footballer who plays as a goalkeeper for Ayeyawady and the Myanmar women's national football team. She was awarded the Best Goalkeeper title of the 2025–26 Myanmar Women's League.

== International career ==
Ei Sandar Zaw has represented the Myanmar women's national football team at the senior level. She was included in the national squad for the Football at the 2025 SEA Games – Women's team squads in Thailand and participated in the 2026 AFC Women's Asian Cup qualification tournament.

=== Club career ===
Ei Sandar Zaw is the goalkeeper for Ayeyawady. In the 2025–26 Myanmar Women's League season, she played a main role in her team's success, keeping multiple clean sheets as Ayeyawady United clinched the league title on the final matchday.

== Honours ==
Ayeyawady

- Myanmar Women League: 2025–26

Individual

- Myanmar Women League Golden Glove: 2025-26
