= Phee Bay =

Myanmar footballer (born 2005)

Personal information
- Full name: Nar Phee Bay
- Date of birth: 15 December 2005 (age 20)
- Place of birth: Wa, Myanmar
- Height: 1.65 m (5 ft 5 in)
- Position: Goalkeeper

Team information
- Current team: Yangon United
- Number: 12

Youth career
- 2022–2023: YERO Academy

Senior career*
Years	Team	Apps	(Gls)
2023–	Yangon United	25	(0)

International career
2023	Myanmar U-19	5	(0)
- * Club domestic league appearances and goals

Phee Bay (Burmese: ဖီးဘေ; born 15 December 2005) is a Burmese professional footballer who plays as a goalkeeper for Yangon United and the Myanmar women's national football team. She was awarded the title of "Best Goalkeeper" of the 2024 Myanmar Women's League.

== Career ==
=== International career ===
In 2023, Phee Bay represented the Myanmar U19 team.

=== Club career ===
Phee Bay began her professional career with Yangon United in 2023. During the 2024 season, she became the club's primary goalkeeper, with the club finishing as runner's up in the league.

== Honours ==
Individual

- Myanmar Women League Golden Glove: 2024
