= May Zin Nwe =

Burmese footballer

Personal information
- Date of birth: 7 March 1995 (age 31)
- Place of birth: Yamethin, Myanmar
- Position: Goalkeeper

Team information
- Current team: Shan United
- Number: 1

Senior career*
Years	Team	Apps	(Gls)
2021-2024	Myawady W.F.C		
2025–	Shan United		

International career^{‡}
2019–	Myanmar	52	(0)
- * Club domestic league appearances and goals as of 5 sept 2025 ‡ National team caps and goals as of 30 Sep 2023

May Zin Nwe (Burmese: မေဇင်နွယ်; born 7 March 1995) is a Burmese footballer who plays as a goalkeeper for the Myanmar women's national team.

== Award ==
- Golden Glove - 2023
