= Zin Moe Pyae =

Myanmar footballer (born 2003)

Personal information
- Date of birth: 15 January 2003 (age 23)
- Place of birth: Magway, Myanmar
- Height: 1.62 m (5 ft 4 in)
- Position: Forward

Team information
- Current team: Yangon United
- Number: 9

Senior career*
Years	Team	Apps	(Gls)
2023–	Yangon United	28	(35)
2026 (loan)	Ayeyawady	3	(0)

International career
2023	Myanmar U-19	4	(3)
2026–	Myanmar	2	(0)
- * Club domestic league appearances and goals

Zin Moe Pyae (Burmese: ဇင်မိုးပြည့်; born 15 January 2003) is a Burmese women's professional footballer who plays for the Myanmar women's national football team.

== Club career ==
Zin Moe Pyae plays for Yangon United. In the 2025–26 season, she scored 22 goals to become the league's top scorer. She previously played for the club during the 2023 and 2024 seasons.

== International career ==
Zin Moe Pyae has represented Myanmar at both youth and senior levels. She played for the Myanmar U-19 team and scored in the 2024 AFC U-20 Women's Asian Cup qualification. Zin Moe Pyae's senior team debut match is against Uzbekistan women's national football team at 2026 AYA Bank Tri-Nations Cup, she was substituted for Yu Per Khaing.

== Honours ==
- Golden Boot winner - 2025-26
