= Khin Marlar Tun =

Burmese footballer

Personal information
- Full name: Khin Marlar Tun
- Date of birth: 21 September 1989 (age 37)
- Place of birth: Mandalay, Myanmar
- Height: 1.64 m (5 ft 5 in)
- Position: Midfielder

Team information
- Current team: ISPE
- Number: 11

Senior career*
Years	Team	Apps	(Gls)
2016–	ISPE	75	(36)
2022–2024	→ College of Asian Scholars (loan)	15	(9)

International career^{‡}
2009–	Myanmar	126	(33)
- * Club domestic league appearances and goals ‡ National team caps and goals as of 13:37, 20 May 2023 (UTC)

Khin Marlar Tun is a footballer from Myanmar who plays as a midfielder. She is one of the team captains for Myanmar’s ISPE FC.

== Honours ==
–Khin Marlar Tun Honours
Team	Competition	Title	Seasons	Runners-up	Runners-up seasons	Third Place	Third Place Seasons
ISPE W.F.C	Myanmar Women League	3	2017-18; 2018-19; 2024	2	2023,2025–26	0	0
ISPE W.F.C	AFC Women's Club Championship	0	0	0	0	1	2022
College of Asian Scholars	Thai Women's League	2	2022,2024	0	0	0	0

=== Top Soccer ===
– Top Soccer
Team	Competition	Top soccer	Seasons
ISPE W.F.C	Myanmar Women League	2	2022,2023

== Internationals team goals and apps ==
– Internationals goals and apps
Team	Internationals	Goals	apps
ISPE W.F.C	AFC Women's Club Championship	1	2
ISPE W.F.C	AFC Women's Champions League	1	6

== International National team goals ==
.Scores and results list Myanmar's goal tally first.

No.	Date	Venue	Opponent	Score	Result	Competition
1.	4 December 2007	Municipality of Tumbon Mueangpug Stadium, Nakhon Ratchasima, Thailand	Malaysia	2–0	5–0	2007 Southeast Asian Games
2.	4 December 2007	Municipality of Tumbon Mueangpug Stadium, Nakhon Ratchasima, Thailand	Malaysia	5–0	5–0	2007 Southeast Asian Games
3.	7 December 2007	Municipality of Tumbon Mueangpug Stadium, Nakhon Ratchasima, Thailand	Thailand	2–0	2–2	2007 Southeast Asian Games
4.	6 December 2009	National University of Laos Stadium, Vientiane, Laos	Thailand	1–0	2–2	2009 Southeast Asian Games
5.	6 December 2009	National University of Laos Stadium, Vientiane, Laos	Thailand	2–1	2–2	2009 Southeast Asian Games
6.	13 December 2009	Laos National Stadium, Vientiane, Laos	Malaysia	1–0	7–1	2009 Southeast Asian Games
7.	18 March 2011	Kaohsiung National Stadium, Kaohsiung, Taiwan	Chinese Taipei	1–1	1–1	2012 Summer Olympic Qualifiers
8.	19 October 2011	New Laos National Stadium, Vientiane, Laos	Malaysia	1–0	8–0	2011 AFF Women's Championship
9.	21 October 2011	Laos National Stadium, Vientiane, Laos	Thailand	1–0	1–3	2011 AFF Women's Championship
10.	10 September 2013	Thuwunna Stadium, Yangon, Myanmar	Laos	2–0	5–0	2013 AFF Women's Championship
11.	15 March 2015	Mandalarthiri Stadium, Mandalay, Myanmar	India	2–0	7–0	2016 AFC Women's Olympic Qualifying Tournament
12.	15 March 2015	Mandalarthiri Stadium, Mandalay, Myanmar	India	5–0	7–0	2016 AFC Women's Olympic Qualifying Tournament
13.	27 July 2016	Mandalarthiri Stadium, Mandalay, Myanmar	Timor-Leste	2–0	17–0	2016 AFF Women's Championship
14.	27 July 2016	Mandalarthiri Stadium, Mandalay, Myanmar	Timor-Leste	9–0	17–0	2016 AFF Women's Championship
15.	9 July 2018	Jakabaring Stadium, Palembang, Indonesia	Vietnam	3–4	3–4	2018 AFF Women's Championship
16.	16 August 2019	IPE Chonburi Stadium, Chonburi, Thailand	Indonesia	6–0	7–0	2019 AFF Women's Championship
17.	18 August 2019	IPE Chonburi Stadium, Chonburi, Thailand	Cambodia	2–0	10–1	2019 AFF Women's Championship
18.	25 August 2019	IPE Chonburi Stadium, Chonburi, Thailand	Thailand	1–3	1–3	2019 AFF Women's Championship
19.	2 December 2019	Biñan Football Stadium, Biñan, Philippines	Malaysia	3–0	5–0	2019 Southeast Asian Games
20.	28 January 2022	DY Patil Stadium, Navi Mumbai, India	Vietnam	2–1	2–2	2022 AFC Women's Asian Cup
21.	10 May 2022	Cẩm Phả Stadium, Cẩm Phả, Vietnam	Laos	2–0	3–0	2021 Southeast Asian Games
22.	10 May 2022	Cẩm Phả Stadium, Cẩm Phả, Vietnam	Laos	3–0	3–0	2021 Southeast Asian Games
23.	5 July 2022	Biñan Football Stadium, Biñan, Philippines	Timor-Leste	4–0	7–0	2022 AFF Women's Championship
24.	9 July 2022	Biñan Football Stadium, Biñan, Philippines	Cambodia	1–0	3–0	2022 AFF Women's Championship
25.	11 July 2022	Biñan Football Stadium, Biñan, Philippines	Laos	2–0	3–1	2022 AFF Women's Championship
26.	9 May 2023	RCAF Old Stadium, Phnom Penh, Cambodia	Malaysia	1–0	5–1	2023 Southeast Asian Games
27.	23 October 2024	Thuwunna Stadium, Yangon, Myanmar	Hong Kong	1–1	4–1	Friendly

== See also ==
- List of Myanmar women's international footballers
