= San Thaw Thaw =

Burmese footballer

Personal information
- Date of birth: 9 January 2001 (age 25)
- Place of birth: Nyaungdon, Myanmar
- Height: 1.50 m (4 ft 11 in)
- Position: Forward

Team information
- Current team: Ayeyawady
- Number: 10

Senior career*
Years	Team	Apps	(Gls)
2020–2023	Myawady		
2024–	Ayeyawady	18	(23)
2025	→ ISPE W.F.C (loan)	6	(3)
2026	→ Stallion Laguna (loan)		

International career^{‡}
2016	Myanmar U16	4	(11)
2018–2021	Myanmar U19	8	(6)
2019–	Myanmar	44	(9)
- * Club domestic league appearances and goals ‡ National team caps and goals as of 30 September 2023

San Thaw Thaw (born 9 January 2001) is a Burmese professional footballer who plays as a forward for Burmese club Ayeyawady and the Myanmar national team.

== Honours ==
–San Thaw Thaw Honours
Team	Competition	Title	Seasons	Runners-up	Runners-up seasons	Third Place	Third Place Seasons
Myawady W.F.C	Myanmar Women League	1	2023	0	0	0	0
Ayeyawady W.F.C	Myanmar Women League	1	2025-26	0	0	0	0

=== Top Soccer ===
– Top Soccer
Team	Competition	Top soccer	Seasons
Myawady W.F.C	Myanmar Women League	1	2023
Ayeyawady W.F.C	Myanmar Women League	1	2024

== Internationals goals and apps ==
– Internationals goals and apps
Team	Internationals	Goals	apps
ISPE W.F.C	AFC Women's Champions League	3	6
Stallion Laguna	AFC Women's Champions League	0	1

== International career ==
San Thaw Thaw represented Myanmar at the 2015 AFC U-14 Girls' Regional Championship, the 2017 AFC U-16 Women's Championship and the 2019 AFC U-19 Women's Championship. She made her senior debut on 20 November 2019 in a 1–0 friendly win against Chinese Taipei. She played the 2019 Southeast Asian Games.

== Career statistics ==
=== International ===
No.	Date	Venue	Opponent	Score	Result	Competition
1.	18 October 2021	Dolen Omurzakov Stadium, Bishkek, Kyrgyzstan	Lebanon	3–0	4–0	2022 AFC Women's Asian Cup qualification
2.	21 October 2021	Dolen Omurzakov Stadium, Bishkek, Kyrgyzstan	Guam	5–0	8–0	2022 AFC Women's Asian Cup qualification
3.	21 October 2021	Dolen Omurzakov Stadium, Bishkek, Kyrgyzstan	Guam	6–0	8–0	2022 AFC Women's Asian Cup qualification
4.	17 July 2022	Biñan Football Stadium, Biñan, Philippines	Vietnam	1–0	4–3	2022 AFF Women's Championship
5.	17 July 2022	Biñan Football Stadium, Biñan, Philippines	Vietnam	2–2	4–3	2022 AFF Women's Championship
6.	17 July 2022	Biñan Football Stadium, Biñan, Philippines	Vietnam	3–3	4–3	2022 AFF Women's Championship
7.	9 May 2023	RCAF Old Stadium, Phnom Penh, Cambodia	Malaysia	4–1	5–1	2023 Southeast Asian Games
8.	9 May 2023	RCAF Old Stadium, Phnom Penh, Cambodia	Malaysia	5–1	5–1	2023 Southeast Asian Games
9.	12 May 2023	RCAF Old Stadium, Phnom Penh, Cambodia	Thailand	3–2	4–2	2023 Southeast Asian Games
10.	9 July 2024	Thuwunna Stadium, Yangon, Myanmar	India	2–1	2–1	Friendly
11.	23 October 2024	Thuwunna Stadium, Yangon, Myanmar	Hong Kong	2–1	4–1	Friendly
12.	26 October 2024	Thuwunna Stadium, Yangon, Myanmar	Hong Kong	2–1	4–1	Friendly
13.	17 February 2025	Dasharath Rangasala, Kathmandu, Nepal	Lebanon	3–1	3–1	2025 Vianet Championship
14.	29 June 2025	Thuwunna Stadium, Yangon, Myanmar	Turkmenistan	5–0	8–0	2026 AFC Women's Asian Cup qualification
15.	8 December 2025	IPE Chonburi Stadium, Chonburi, Thailand	Malaysia	1–0	3–0	2025 Southeast Asian Games
