= Ayeyawady W.F.C. =

Myanmar professional women's football club

Ayeyawady
- Full name: Ayeyawady Women's Football Club
- Nickname: The Ayeyawady
- Short name: AYA
- Founded: 2024; 2 years ago
- Ground: Koe Thein Stadium
- Capacity: 2500
- President: U Moe Aung Chaw
- Head coach: Kumiko Tashiro
- League: Myanmar Women League
- 2025–26: 1st (Champions)
Home colours	Away colours

Ayeyawady Women's Football Club (Burmese: ဧရာဝတီအမျိုးသမီး ဘောလုံးအသင်း) is a professional women's association football club based in the Ayeyawady Region, Myanmar. The club competes in the Myanmar Women League, the top-tier of women's football in the country.

The club achieved historical milestones in the 2025–26 season, by winning the league title undefeated and qualifying for the AFC Women's Champions League.

== History ==
=== Formation and debut (2024) ===
Ayeyawady Women's Football Club was created to bring professional football to the Ayeyawady region. In their first year, the club finished in third place, and their striker San Thaw Thaw became the league’s top scorer with 19 goals. Retired national footballer and native of Nyaungdon Township,, Than Than Htwe, returned after a 9 year hiatus to play for the club.

=== 2025–26: Historic championship ===
At the beginning of the 2025–26 season, Ayeyawady W.F.C. signed Myanmar midfielder Phyu Phyu Win. In mid-2025, they signed Alyssa Ube from the Philippines and Kirara Ogawa from Japan. These international signings were a first for Myanmar's professional women's clubs and presented a major change for the league. The 2025 Match between Ayeyawady and Yangon United was the most watched women's football match in league history, according to the Myanmar Football Federation.

On 31 January 2026, Ayeyawady won the league title with an undefeated record, The ASEAN Football Federation also reported on their win. with 40 points. They were presented with 500 million kyat as the grand prize for the championship. The club held a trophy parade in Pathein for their local community. Ayeyawady later signed Bangladeshi women’s player Ritu Porna Chakma on loan, to compete in the AFC Champions League. Also called former player Alyssa Ube and Thailand U-20 women's player Nachanok Kosonsaksakul

=== 2026–27 season ===
In August 2026, they played their first-ever AFC Champions League match against Albirex Jurong, winning by 4–0 at Thuwunna Stadium. The team also signed American footballer McKenna Davidson who previously played for the Philippine club Stallion Laguna and in the UEFA Women's Champions League. In an interview, Davidson expressed that there was a lot support for the local women's league in Myanmar, seeing a full stadium for her debut game with Ayeyawady.

== Players ==
=== Current squad ===
As of October 2026

Note: Flags indicate national team as defined under FIFA eligibility rules; some limited exceptions apply. Players may hold more than one non-FIFA nationality.

No.	Pos.	Nation	Player
1	GK	MYA	Ei Sandar Zaw
2	DF	MYA	Thae Ei Hlaing
3	DF	MYA	Nan Phyu Phwe
4	DF	MYA	Zune Yu Ya Oo
5	MF	MYA	Phyu Phyu Win
6	MF	MYA	Naw Htet Htet Wai (vice-captain)
8	MF	USA	McKenna Davidson
9	FW	MYA	Su Su Khin
10	FW	MYA	San Thaw Thaw
11	MF	MYA	Lae Lae Hlaing (captain)
12	MF	MYA	Htet Htet Win
14	MF	JPN	Hanako Fujii
15	MF	MYA	Nang Khine Zin Myint
17	FW	MYA	Shin Thant Phyu Sin Pyone
18	DF	MYA	Naing Naing Win
19	DF	MYA	Phyu Phyu Kyaw

No.	Pos.	Nation	Player
20	DF	JPN	Kana Ueda
21	FW	JPN	Hinari Miyamoto
22	DF	MYA	Phoo Phoo Khin Kyaw
23	GK	MYA	Pan Nu Wai
26	MF	MYA	L L Seng Htoi Nan
28	MF	MYA	Min Htone May Zitar
29	MF	MYA	Hnin Ei Lwin
30	DF	MYA	Khin Moe Win
35	GK	MYA	Khin Khin Kyaw
47	MF	MYA	Zi Tar Shin

== Coaching staff ==
As of October 2026

Position	Staff
Head coach	(Japan) Kumiko Tashiro
Assistant coach	(Myanmar) San Yu Naing (Myanmar) Khin Than Wai
Goalkeeping coach	(Myanmar) Phyo Ko Ko Hlaing
Manager	(Myanmar) Bo Bo Win
Medical	(Myanmar) Nilar Min
Media Officer	(Myanmar) Thiha Myo Kyaw
Kit Manager	(Myanmar) Pann Cherry
Transport Officer	(Myanmar) Kyaw Myo Thwin

== Kits and sponsors ==
Period	Kit manufacturer	Title sponsor	Co-sponsor
2024–2025	(Myanmar) Glory Sport	Livan	
2026–	(Myanmar) Glory Sport	Guotai Auto	Oppo; GYCT

Ayeyawady partnered with West Ham United, who provides support for Ayeyarwady's sports science. BTL Medical Myanmar is club's partner for athletic testing and rehabilitation equipment.

== Honours ==
=== Domestic league ===
- Myanmar Women League
  - (gold) Champions (1): 2025–26
  - (bronze) Third place (1): 2024

== Domestic record ==
Season	League									Top goalscorer		Coach
Season	Div.	Pos.	Pl.	W	D	L	GS	GA	P	Name	Goals	Coach
2024	1st	3rd	18	8	3	7	31	26	27	San Thaw Thaw	19	Aung Kyaw Zan
2025–26	1st	1st	16	12	4	0	44	11	40	San Thaw Thaw	20	Aung Kyaw Zan
2026–27	1st											

== Continental record ==
All results list Ayeyawady's goal tally first.

Season	Competition	Round	Opponent	Result
2026–27	AFC Champions League	Preliminary stage	(Singapore) Albirex Jurong	4–0
2026–27	AFC Champions League	Preliminary stage	(Lebanon) No Limits	8–0
2026–27	AFC Champions League	Preliminary stage	(Chinese Taipei) NTC Hang Yuan	1–0
2026–27	AFC Champions League	Group stage	(North Korea) Naegohyang	0–7
2026–27	AFC Champions League	Group stage	(Japan) Kobe Leonessa	0–2
2026–27	AFC Champions League	Group stage	(Iran) Bam Khatoon	3–0
