= Myat Noe Khin =

Burmese footballer

Personal information
- Date of birth: 24 July 2003 (age 23)
- Place of birth: Yangon, Myanmar
- Height: 1.60 m (5 ft 3 in)
- Position: Forward

Team information
- Current team: Thitsar Arman Women club
- Number: 9

Senior career*
Years	Team	Apps	(Gls)
2017–2022	YERO	6	(17)
2023–	Thitsar Arman	16	(20)

International career^{‡}
2016	Myanmar U14	5	(4)
2018–2019	Myanmar U16	6	(7)
2018–	Myanmar U19	1	(1)
2019–	Myanmar	45	(7)
- * Club domestic league appearances and goals ‡ National team caps and goals as of 25 Sep 2023

Myat Noe Khin (Burmese: မြတ်နိုးခင်; born 24 July 2003) is a Burmese footballer who plays as a forward for the Myanmar women's national team.

== Honours ==
–Myat Noe Khin Honours
Team	Competition	Title	Seasons	Runners-up	Runners-up seasons	Third Place	Third Place Seasons
Thitsar Arman W.F.C	Myanmar Women League	0	0	0	0	1	2025-26

== International goals ==
No.	Date	Venue	Opponent	Score	Result	Competition
1.	18 October 2021	Dolen Omurzakov Stadium, Bishkek, Kyrgyzstan	Lebanon	2–0	4–0	2022 AFC Women's Asian Cup qualification
2.	21 October 2021	Dolen Omurzakov Stadium, Bishkek, Kyrgyzstan	Guam	2–0	2–0	2022 AFC Women's Asian Cup qualification
3.	5 July 2022	Biñan Football Stadium, Biñan, Philippines	Timor-Leste	6–0	7–0	2022 AFF Women's Championship
4.	5 July 2022	Biñan Football Stadium, Biñan, Philippines	Timor-Leste	7–0	7–0	2022 AFF Women's Championship
5.	9 July 2022	Biñan Football Stadium, Biñan, Philippines	Cambodia	2–0	3–0	2022 AFF Women's Championship
6.	12 May 2023	RCAF Old Stadium, Phnom Penh, Cambodia	Thailand	4–2	4–2	2023 Southeast Asian Games
7.	25 September 2023	Wenzhou Sports Center Stadium, Wenzhou, China	Hong Kong	1–0	1–0	2022 Asian Games
8.	23 February 2025	Dasharath Rangasala, Kathmandu, Nepal	Nepal	2–1	2–2	2025 Vianet Championship
