= I.S.P.E F.C. =

I.S.P.E
- Full name: Institute of Sports & Physical Education Football Club
- Ground: Mandalarthiri Stadium
- Capacity: 31,270
- Owner(s): Department of Sports and Physical Education (under Ministry of Sports and Youth Affairs)
- Head coach: Chit Naing
- League: Myanmar National League
- 2025–26: MNL, 4th of 12
- Website: http://www.ispeyangon.com/
Home colours	Away colours

I.S.P.E Football Club is a Burmese professional football club based in Mandalay, Myanmar.

== Honours ==
ISPE FC – Honours
Type	Competition	Titles	Title Seasons	Runners-up	Runners-up seasons	Third Place	Third Place Seasons
Domestic	Myanmar National League	0	–	0	–	1	2023
Domestic	MNL-2	0	–	1	2019	–	–
Domestic	Myanmar Women League	3	2018–19, 2022, 2024	1	2023	–	–
International	AFC Women's Club Championship	0	–	–	–	1	2022
Youth	MNL U-21 Youth League	1	2018	–	–	1	2017
Youth	MNL U-20 Youth League	2	2018	1	2019	1	2024
Youth	MNL U-18 Youth League	0	–	1	2016	–	–

== Continental Men's record ==
International all results (home and away) lis ISPE goal tally first.

Season	Competition	Round	Club	Home	Away	Aggregate

{end}

== Seasons statistics ==
=== Men's Team ===
Season	League									Top goalscorer		Coach
Season	Div.	Pos.	Pl.	W	D	L	GS	GA	P	Name	Goals	Coach

== 2025 squad ==
Note: Flags indicate national team as defined under FIFA eligibility rules; some limited exceptions apply. Players may hold more than one non-FIFA nationality.

No.	Pos.	Nation	Player
1	GK	MYA	Zar Ni Hein
2	DF	MYA	Zin Maung Maung
3	DF	MYA	Zin Ye Naung
4	DF	MYA	Kyaw Thiha Zaw
6	FW	MYA	Hein Htet Nyein
7	MF	MYA	Thein Zaw Thiha
8	MF	MYA	Khaing Ye Win (captain)
9	FW	MYA	Kaung Myat Nyein
10	FW	MYA	Win Pyae Maung
11	MF	MYA	Than Toe Aung
12	DF	MYA	Kaung Khant Zaw

No.	Pos.	Nation	Player
15	FW	MYA	Saw Lin Htet Paing
16	DF	MYA	Soe Lin Aung
17	FW	MYA	Sanda Naing
20	MF	MYA	Chit Yin Htoo
23	DF	MYA	Moe Swe Aung
24	MF	MYA	Lwin Pyone Aung
25	DF	MYA	Kyaw Zaya
26	DF	MYA	Mar Tee No
27	MF	MYA	Saw Se Ka Paw Say
30	GK	MYA	Paing Zin

== See also ==
- AFC Women's Champions League
- AFC Women's Club Championship
- Myanmar National League
- Myanmar National League Cup
- MNL-2
- Myanmar Women League
- List of Myanmar women's international footballers
