= AFC Women's Club Championship =

Defunct Asian association football tournament for women's clubs

- Organiser(s): AFC
- Founded: 2019; 7 years ago
- Abolished: 2024; 2 years ago
- Region: Asia
- Last champions: (Japan) Urawa Red Diamonds (1st title)
- Website: the-afc.com

The AFC Women's Club Championship was a former women's football club competition in Asia. It involved the top clubs from countries affiliated with the Asian Football Confederation (AFC). It was designed as a pilot competition for the AFC Women's Champions League, which was launched in the 2024–25 season.

== History ==
The concept of an Asian women's club competition was first recommended in 2018. The inaugural championship in 2019 was held as a round-robin tournament among four teams from the east region. This was followed by the 2021 championship among four teams from the west region. The last edition of the tournament was held in 2023; the Asian Football Confederation had initially decided to cancel the final match after the group stage since the tournament was only intended to be a pilot for the AFC Women's Champions League. However, following backlash, they decided to hold the final match, where Japan's Urawa Red Diamonds defeated South Korea's Incheon Hyundai Steel Red Angels 2–1.

== Results ==
AFC Women's Club Championship results
Edition	Year	Zone	Format	Winners	Runners-up	Venue	Number of teams
1	2019	—	RR	(Japan) Tokyo Verdy Beleza	(China) Jiangsu	Yongin, South Korea	4
—	2020	—	Cancelled due to the COVID-19 pandemic				
2	2021	—	RR	(Jordan) Amman SC	(Iran) Shahrdari Sirjan	Amman, Jordan	4
3	2022	East	RR	(Thailand) College of Asian Scholars	(Chinese Taipei) Taichung Blue Whale	Chonburi, Thailand	5
3	2022	West	TL	(Uzbekistan) Sogdiana Jizzakh	(Iran) Bam Khatoon	Qarshi, Uzbekistan	5
4	2023	—	GSF	(Japan) Urawa Red Diamonds	(South Korea) Incheon Hyundai Steel Red Angels	Saitama, Japan (final)	8

Key

- GSF = group stage plus final
- RR = round-robin tournament
- TL = two-legged tie

== Records and statistics ==
=== Performances by club ===
Performances in the AFC Women's Club Championship by club
Club	Winners	Runners-up	Years won	Years runners-up
(Japan) Tokyo Verdy Beleza	1	0	2019	—
(Jordan) Amman SC	1	0	2021	—
(Thailand) College of Asian Scholars	1	0	2022 (Note: East zone)	—
(Uzbekistan) Sogdiana Jizzakh	1	0	2022 (Note: West zone)	—
(Japan) Urawa Red Diamonds	1	0	2023	—
(China) Jiangsu	0	1	—	2019
(Iran) Shahrdari Sirjan	0	1	—	2021
(Chinese Taipei) Taichung Blue Whale	0	1	—	2022
(Iran) Bam Khatoon	0	1	—	2022
(South Korea) Incheon Hyundai Steel Red Angels	0	1	—	2023

=== Performances by nation ===
Performances in the AFC Women's Club Championship by nation
Nation	Winners	Runners-up
Japan	2	0
Jordan	1	0
Thailand	1	0
Uzbekistan	1	0
Iran	0	2
China	0	1
Chinese Taipei	0	1
South Korea	0	1

=== Top scorers by year ===
Year	Top scorer(s)	Club(s)	Goals
2019	(Japan) Mina Tanaka	(Japan) Tokyo Verdy Beleza	4
2021	Multiple players		2
2022	(Chinese Taipei) Su Yu-hsuan	(Chinese Taipei) Taichung Blue Whale	2
2023	(Japan) Kiko Seike	(Japan) Urawa Red Diamonds	7

== See also ==
- AFC Women's Champions League
- FIFA Women's Club World Cup
- Continental football championships
