= 2026 AFC Women's Asian Cup squads =

The 2026 AFC Women's Asian Cup is an international women's association football tournament being held in Australia from 1 to 21 March 2026. The 12 national teams involved in the tournament were required to register a squad of 18 to 26 players, including three goalkeepers (Regulations Article 24.4). Only players in these squads are eligible to take part in the tournament. If a player became seriously injured or ill prior to the tournament, they could be replaced in the squad prior to their first match (Regulations Article 24.3). Each team was required to submit their squad list at least 10 days prior to its first match of the tournament.

Each national team had to register a preliminary list of minimum of 18 and maximum of 50 players (including at least four goalkeepers) via the Asian Football Confederation Administration System (AFCAS) no later than 30 days before to its first match of the tournament. Teams were able to replace or add up to 5 players to their preliminary list no later than 7 days before to its first match of the tournament provided that the maximum number of registered players is not exceeded (Regulations Article 23.10). The final list of 18−26 players per national team had to be submitted to the AFC at least 10 days prior to its first match of the tournament. All players in the final selection must had been registered in the preliminary list (Regulations Article 23.8).

The age listed for each player is on 1 March 2026, the first day of the tournament. The numbers of caps and goals listed for each player do not include any matches played after the start of the tournament. The club listed is the club for which the player last played a competitive match prior to the tournament. A flag is included for coaches who are of a different nationality than their own national team.

== Group A ==
=== Australia ===
Head coach: Joe Montemurro

Australia announced their 26-player squad on 19 February 2026. On 21 February, Teagan Micah withdrew from the squad due to concussion and was replaced by Chloe Lincoln. On 1 March, Jada Mathyssen-Whyman withdrew from the squad due to injury and was replaced by Morgan Aquino.

No.	Pos.	Player	Date of birth (age)	Caps	Goals	Club
1	GK	Mackenzie Arnold	25 February 1994 (aged 32)	61	0	(United States Soccer Federation) Portland Thorns
2	DF	Courtney Nevin	12 February 2002 (aged 24)	40	1	(Swedish Football Association) Malmö
3	DF	Wini Heatley	18 June 2001 (aged 24)	13	0	(Italian Football Federation) Roma
4	DF	Clare Hunt	12 March 1999 (aged 26)	39	1	(The Football Association) Tottenham Hotspur
5	DF	Jamilla Rankin	9 May 2003 (aged 22)	7	0	(German Football Association) TSG Hoffenheim
6	MF	Clare Wheeler	14 January 1998 (aged 28)	34	2	(The Football Association) Everton
7	DF	Steph Catley	26 January 1994 (aged 32)	141	7	(The Football Association) Arsenal
8	MF	Kaitlyn Torpey	17 March 2000 (aged 25)	21	2	(The Football Association) Newcastle United
9	FW	Caitlin Foord	11 November 1994 (aged 31)	140	39	(The Football Association) Arsenal
10	MF	Emily van Egmond	12 July 1993 (aged 32)	165	32	(The Football Association) Leicester City
11	FW	Mary Fowler	14 February 2003 (aged 23)	63	16	(The Football Association) Manchester City
12	GK	Chloe Lincoln	4 January 2005 (aged 21)	3	0	(Football Australia) Brisbane Roar
13	MF	Alex Chidiac	15 January 1999 (aged 27)	37	2	(Italian Football Federation) Como
14	DF	Alanna Kennedy	21 January 1995 (aged 31)	142	12	(The Football Association) London City Lionesses
15	FW	Kahli Johnson	18 February 2004 (aged 22)	3	1	(Canadian Soccer Association) Calgary Wild
16	FW	Hayley Raso	5 September 1994 (aged 31)	103	24	(German Football Association) Eintracht Frankfurt
17	MF	Amy Sayer	30 November 2001 (aged 24)	19	4	(Swedish Football Association) Malmö
18	GK	Morgan Aquino	4 August 2001 (aged 24)	0	0	(United States Soccer Federation) DC Power
19	MF	Katrina Gorry	13 August 1992 (aged 33)	118	18	(The Football Association) West Ham United
20	FW	Sam Kerr (captain)	10 September 1993 (aged 32)	131	69	(The Football Association) Chelsea
21	DF	Ellie Carpenter	28 April 2000 (aged 25)	93	5	(The Football Association) Chelsea
22	FW	Michelle Heyman	4 July 1988 (aged 37)	85	33	(Football Australia) Canberra United
23	MF	Kyra Cooney-Cross	15 February 2002 (aged 24)	63	2	(The Football Association) Arsenal
24	DF	Charlize Rule	16 February 2003 (aged 23)	1	0	(The Football Association) Brighton & Hove Albion
25	FW	Holly McNamara	23 January 2003 (aged 23)	16	1	(Football Australia) Melbourne City
26	FW	Remy Siemsen	10 November 1999 (aged 26)	14	0	(Swedish Football Association) Rosengård

=== Iran ===
Head coach: Marziyeh Jafari

Iran announced their 25-player squad on 18 February 2026. Behnaz Taherkhani was added to the squad on 25 February.

No.	Pos.	Player	Date of birth (age)	Caps	Goals	Club
1	GK	Raha Yazdani	1 July 1987 (aged 38)			(Football Federation Islamic Republic of Iran) Bam Khatoon
2	DF	Atefeh Imani	28 July 1996 (aged 29)			(Football Federation Islamic Republic of Iran) Palayesh Gaz Ilam
3	DF	Atefeh Ramezanizadeh	21 April 1992 (aged 33)			(Football Federation Islamic Republic of Iran) Bam Khatoon
4	DF	Melika Motevalli	6 May 1998 (aged 27)			(Football Federation Islamic Republic of Iran) Bam Khatoon
5	DF	Zahra Ahmadizadeh	4 June 1997 (aged 28)			(Football Federation Islamic Republic of Iran) Persepolis
6	MF	Zahra Sarbali	13 August 1993 (aged 32)			(Football Federation Islamic Republic of Iran) Gol Gohar Sirjan
7	FW	Afsaneh Chatrenoor	14 April 1998 (aged 27)			(Football Federation Islamic Republic of Iran) Gol Gohar Sirjan
8	MF	Shabnam Beheshti	30 November 1998 (aged 27)			(Football Federation Islamic Republic of Iran) Gol Gohar Sirjan
9	FW	Zahra Ghanbari (captain)	4 March 1992 (aged 33)			(Football Federation Islamic Republic of Iran) Persepolis
10	MF	Fatemeh Pasandideh	4 April 2004 (aged 21)			(Football Federation Islamic Republic of Iran) Bam Khatoon
11	FW	Maryam Dini	12 March 2007 (aged 18)			(Football Federation Islamic Republic of Iran) Bam Khatoon
12	GK	Maryam Yektaei	19 June 1993 (aged 32)			(Polish Football Association) Energa Stomilanki Olsztyn
13	DF	Fatemeh Amineh	3 June 1997 (aged 28)			(Football Federation Islamic Republic of Iran) Bam Khatoon
14	DF	Fatemeh Makhdoomi	14 February 2001 (aged 25)			(Football Federation Islamic Republic of Iran) Sangin Mashin Ista
15	MF	Mohaddeseh Zolfi	16 January 2005 (aged 21)			(Football Federation Islamic Republic of Iran) Sangin Mashin Ista
16	MF	Fatemeh Shaban	4 November 2002 (aged 23)			(Football Federation Islamic Republic of Iran) Sangin Mashin Ista
17	DF	Shahnaz Jafarizadeh	16 March 1994 (aged 31)			(Football Federation Islamic Republic of Iran) Bam Khatoon
18	DF	Sana Sadeghi	12 June 2000 (aged 25)			(Football Federation Islamic Republic of Iran) Persepolis
19	FW	Roujin Tamrian	29 December 2005 (aged 20)			(Football Federation Islamic Republic of Iran) Bam Khatoon
20	FW	Sara Didar	27 November 2004 (aged 21)			(Football Federation Islamic Republic of Iran) Bam Khatoon
21	FW	Golnoosh Khosravi	12 May 2001 (aged 24)			(Football Federation Islamic Republic of Iran) Gol Gohar Sirjan
22	GK	Zahra Khajavi	8 February 1999 (aged 27)			(Football Federation Islamic Republic of Iran) Persepolis
23	MF	Mona Hamoudi	11 November 1993 (aged 32)			(Football Federation Islamic Republic of Iran) Bam Khatoon
24	DF	Kosar Anbari	28 January 1995 (aged 31)			(Football Federation Islamic Republic of Iran) Palayesh Gaz Ilam
25	DF	Zahra Pourheidar	15 April 1994 (aged 31)			(Football Federation Islamic Republic of Iran) Malavan
26	DF	Behnaz Taherkhani	22 May 1995 (aged 30)			(Football Federation Islamic Republic of Iran) Malavan

=== Philippines ===
Head coach: (Australia) Mark Torcaso

The Philippines announced their 26-player squad on 20 February 2026.

No.	Pos.	Player	Date of birth (age)	Caps	Goals	Club
1	GK	Olivia McDaniel	14 October 1997 (aged 28)	59	0	(Philippine Football Federation) Stallion Laguna
2	DF	Malea Cesar	9 December 2003 (aged 22)	37	1	(United States Soccer Federation) Trinity Tigers
3	DF	Jessika Cowart	30 October 1999 (aged 26)	45	3	(Canadian Soccer Association) Vancouver Rise
4	MF	Natalie Oca	3 November 2006 (aged 19)	3	0	(United States Soccer Federation) UC San Diego Tritons
5	DF	Hali Long (captain)	21 January 1995 (aged 31)	101	22	(Football Association of Thailand) College of Asian Scholars
6	MF	Jaclyn Sawicki	14 November 1992 (aged 33)	44	1	(Canadian Soccer Association) Calgary Wild
7	FW	Jael-Marie Guy	15 August 2007 (aged 18)	5	1	(United States Soccer Federation) Brown Bears
8	MF	Sara Eggesvik	29 April 1997 (aged 28)	50	6	(Norwegian Football Federation) LSK Kvinner
9	MF	Carleigh Frilles	11 April 2002 (aged 23)	45	13	(United States Soccer Federation) DC Power
10	FW	Chandler McDaniel	4 February 1998 (aged 28)	31	12	(Philippine Football Federation) Stallion Laguna
11	MF	Anicka Castañeda	16 December 1999 (aged 26)	42	12	(Philippine Football Federation) Kaya–Iloilo
12	DF	Kaya Hawkinson	17 April 2000 (aged 25)	23	1	(Philippine Football Federation) Stallion Laguna
13	DF	Angela Beard	16 August 1997 (aged 28)	25	1	(Football Australia) Brisbane Roar
14	MF	Jourdyn Curran	11 May 2003 (aged 22)	0	0	(Football Association of Iceland) Vestri
15	MF	Isabella Pasion	14 July 2006 (aged 19)	21	0	(Philippine Football Federation) Stallion Laguna
16	DF	Sofia Wunsch	16 February 1999 (aged 27)	58	3	Free agent
17	DF	Ariana Markey	8 June 2007 (aged 18)	3	1	(United States Soccer Federation) Pepperdine Waves
18	GK	Nina Meollo	23 June 2004 (aged 21)	1	0	(The Football Association) Real Bedford
19	FW	Alessandrea Carpio	4 March 2002 (aged 23)	9	0	(Philippine Football Federation) Kaya–Iloilo
20	DF	Janae DeFazio	6 September 2001 (aged 24)	11	0	(Football Australia) Western Sydney Wanderers
21	FW	Katrina Guillou	19 December 1993 (aged 32)	42	13	(United States Soccer Federation) DC Power
22	GK	Leah Bradley	7 April 2009 (aged 16)	0	0	(United States Soccer Federation) Wilmington Hammerheads
23	FW	Alexa Pino	1 March 2007 (aged 19)	10	5	(United States Soccer Federation) Kentucky Wildcats
24	FW	Mallie Ramirez	1 September 2004 (aged 21)	5	2	(United States Soccer Federation) UNLV Rebels
25	MF	Ava Villapando	8 May 2008 (aged 17)	0	0	(United States Soccer Federation) LSU Tigers
26	FW	Paige McSwigan	9 November 2003 (aged 22)	3	0	(United States Soccer Federation) North Florida Ospreys

=== South Korea ===
Head coach: Shin Sang-woo

South Korea announced their 26-player squad on 10 February 2026.

No.	Pos.	Player	Date of birth (age)	Caps	Goals	Club
1	GK	Woo Seo-bin	13 April 2004 (aged 21)	0	0	(Korea Football Association) Seoul WFC
2	DF	Kim Jin-hui	7 October 1998 (aged 27)	8	0	(Korea Football Association) Gyeongju KHNP
3	MF	Park Hye-jeong	30 March 2000 (aged 25)	1	0	(Korea Football Association) Incheon Hyundai Steel Red Angels
4	DF	Shin Na-yeong	9 October 1999 (aged 26)	6	0	(United States Soccer Federation) Brooklyn FC
5	DF	Ko Yoo-jin (captain)	24 January 1997 (aged 29)	6	0	(Korea Football Association) Incheon Hyundai Steel Red Angels
6	FW	Casey Phair	29 June 2007 (aged 18)	19	4	(United States Soccer Federation) Angel City
7	FW	Son Hwa-yeon	15 March 1997 (aged 28)	58	12	(Korea Football Association) Gangjin Swans
8	MF	Kim Shin-ji	3 May 2004 (aged 21)	12	0	(Scottish Football Association) Rangers
9	MF	Mun Eun-ju	1 September 2000 (aged 25)	13	4	(Korea Football Association) Hwacheon KSPO
10	MF	Ji So-yun	21 February 1991 (aged 35)	171	74	(Korea Football Association) Suwon FC
11	MF	Choe Yu-ri	16 September 1994 (aged 31)	69	13	(Korea Football Association) Suwon FC
12	MF	Song Jae-eun	3 April 1997 (aged 28)	2	0	(Korea Football Association) Gangjin Swans
13	MF	Park Soo-jeong	3 November 2004 (aged 21)	3	0	(Italian Football Federation) AC Milan
14	MF	Jung Min-young	28 September 2000 (aged 25)	4	1	(Canadian Soccer Association) Ottawa Rapid
15	FW	Jeon Yu-gyeong	20 January 2004 (aged 22)	2	0	(Norwegian Football Federation) Molde
16	DF	Jang Sel-gi	31 May 1994 (aged 31)	109	16	(Korea Football Association) Gyeongju KHNP
17	FW	Choi Yoo-jung	25 January 1992 (aged 34)	7	1	(Korea Football Association) Hwacheon KSPO
18	GK	Ryu Ji-soo	3 September 1997 (aged 28)	2	0	(Korea Football Association) Sejong Sportstoto
19	DF	Noh Jin-young	3 June 2000 (aged 25)	6	0	(Korea Football Association) Mungyeong Sangmu
20	DF	Kim Hye-ri	25 June 1990 (aged 35)	137	1	(Korea Football Association) Suwon FC
21	GK	Kim Min-jeong	12 September 1996 (aged 29)	19	0	(Korea Football Association) Incheon Hyundai Steel Red Angels
22	DF	Choo Hyo-joo	29 July 2000 (aged 25)	59	6	(Canadian Soccer Association) Ottawa Rapid
23	MF	Kang Chae-rim	23 March 1998 (aged 27)	44	8	(Canadian Soccer Association) Montreal Roses
24	MF	Lee Eun-young	31 March 2002 (aged 23)	22	1	(Korea Football Association) Gangjin Swans
25	DF	Lee Min-hwa	29 October 1999 (aged 26)	3	0	(Korea Football Association) Hwacheon KSPO
26	MF	Kim Min-ji	21 August 2003 (aged 22)	5	1	(Korea Football Association) Seoul WFC

== Group B ==
=== Bangladesh ===
Head coach: (England) Peter Butler

Bangladesh announced their 26-player squad on 19 February 2026.

No.	Pos.	Player	Date of birth (age)	Caps	Goals	Club
1	GK	Rupna Chakma	2 January 2004 (aged 22)	39	0	(Bangladesh Football Federation) Rajshahi Stars
2	DF	Sheuli Azim	20 December 2001 (aged 24)	49	1	(Bangladesh Football Federation) Rajshahi Stars
3	DF	Shamsunnahar Sr.	31 January 2003 (aged 23)	47	0	(Bangladesh Football Federation) Farashganj
4	DF	Afeida Khandaker (captain)	18 November 2006 (aged 19)	26	4	(Bangladesh Football Federation) Rajshahi Stars
5	DF	Kohati Kisku	5 September 2005 (aged 20)	16	1	(Bangladesh Football Federation) Bangladesh Police
6	MF	Monika Chakma	15 September 2003 (aged 22)	39	4	(Bangladesh Football Federation) Farashganj
7	MF	Sapna Rani	9 May 2006 (aged 19)	24	1	(Bangladesh Football Federation) Rajshahi Stars
8	MF	Maria Manda	10 May 2003 (aged 22)	46	1	(Bangladesh Football Federation) Farashganj
9	MF	Anika Rania Siddiqui	25 May 2005 (aged 20)	0	0	Free agent
10	FW	Tohura Khatun	5 May 2003 (aged 22)	33	15	(Bangladesh Football Federation) Farashganj
11	FW	Most Sultana	18 May 2002 (aged 23)	9	0	(Bangladesh Football Federation) Bangladesh Army
12	FW	Sauravi Akanda Prity	31 December 2009 (aged 16)	4	0	(Bangladesh Football Federation) Rajshahi Stars
13	FW	Alpi Akter	31 December 2010 (aged 15)	0	0	(Bangladesh Football Federation) Rajshahi Stars
14	DF	Halima Akther	6 April 2005 (aged 20)	4	0	(Bangladesh Football Federation) Bangladesh Army
15	MF	Munki Akhter	5 December 2008 (aged 17)	14	1	(Bangladesh Football Federation) Rajshahi Stars
16	DF	Unnoti Khatun	30 December 2005 (aged 20)	0	0	(Bangladesh Football Federation) Bangladesh Army
17	FW	Ritu Porna Chakma	30 December 2003 (aged 22)	35	13	(Bangladesh Football Federation) Rajshahi Stars
18	MF	Shaheda Akter Ripa	8 December 2005 (aged 20)	20	1	(Bangladesh Football Federation) Rajshahi Stars
19	FW	Mst Sagorika	1 December 2007 (aged 18)	13	4	(Bangladesh Football Federation) Bangladesh Police
20	FW	Shamsunnahar Jr.	30 March 2004 (aged 21)	31	8	(Bangladesh Football Federation) Farashganj
21	DF	Nabiran Khatun	18 December 2006 (aged 19)	3	0	(Bangladesh Football Federation) BKSP
22	GK	Swarna Rani Mandal	6 June 2006 (aged 19)	2	0	(Bangladesh Football Federation) Rajshahi Stars
23	GK	Mile Akter	14 September 2006 (aged 19)	1	0	(Bangladesh Football Federation) Bangladesh Army
24	MF	Airin Khatun	10 January 2005 (aged 21)	0	0	(Bangladesh Football Federation) Bangladesh Police
25	MF	Umehla Marma	14 August 2007 (aged 18)	4	0	(Bangladesh Football Federation) Ansar & VDP
26	DF	Mst Surovi Akter Arfin	5 June 2008 (aged 17)	0	0	(Bangladesh Football Federation) Bangladesh Army

=== China ===
Head coach: (Australia) Ante Milicic

China announced their 26-player squad on 19 February 2026.

No.	Pos.	Player	Date of birth (age)	Caps	Goals	Club
1	GK	Zhu Yu	23 July 1997 (aged 28)	19	0	(Chinese Football Association) Shanghai
2	DF	Wang Ying	18 November 1997 (aged 28)	4	0	(Football Australia) Western Sydney Wanderers
3	DF	Chen Qiaozhu	8 September 1999 (aged 26)	29	5	(Chinese Football Association) Jiangsu
4	DF	Wang Linlin	4 August 2000 (aged 25)	24	2	(Chinese Football Association) Shanghai
5	DF	Wu Haiyan (captain)	26 February 1993 (aged 33)	142	2	(Chinese Football Association) Wuhan Jiangda
6	MF	Zhang Xin	23 May 1992 (aged 33)	47	9	(Chinese Football Association) Shanghai
7	MF	Wang Shuang	23 January 1995 (aged 31)	130	47	(Chinese Football Association) Wuhan Jiangda
8	DF	Yao Wei	1 September 1997 (aged 28)	53	5	(Chinese Football Association) Wuhan Jiangda
9	FW	Wurigumula	6 June 1996 (aged 29)	9	4	(Chinese Football Association) Changchun Dazhong
10	MF	Wang Yanwen	27 March 1999 (aged 26)	23	4	(French Football Federation) Dijon
11	FW	Wu Chengshu	26 May 1996 (aged 29)	24	2	(French Football Federation) Dijon
12	GK	Peng Shimeng	12 May 1998 (aged 27)	30	0	(Chinese Football Association) Guangdong
13	FW	Jin Kun	4 October 1999 (aged 26)	20	3	(Chinese Football Association) Jiangsu
14	MF	Li Qingtong	14 April 1999 (aged 26)	2	0	(Chinese Football Association) Guangdong
15	MF	Wang Aifang	15 January 2006 (aged 20)	5	1	(Chinese Football Association) Liaoning
16	MF	Liu Jing	28 April 1998 (aged 27)	17	1	(Chinese Football Association) Changchun Dazhong
17	FW	Xie Zongmei	26 April 2006 (aged 19)	0	0	(Chinese Football Association) Liaoning
18	MF	Tang Jiali	16 March 1995 (aged 30)	74	13	(Chinese Football Association) Shanghai
19	MF	Zhang Linyan	16 January 2001 (aged 25)	32	5	(Chinese Football Association) Beijing
20	DF	Zhang Chengxue	2 December 1995 (aged 30)	0	0	(Chinese Football Association) Shandong
21	DF	Li Mengwen	28 March 1995 (aged 30)	39	2	(Scottish Football Association) Rangers
22	GK	Chen Chen	26 June 1993 (aged 32)	0	0	(Chinese Football Association) Wuhan Jiangda
23	FW	Shao Ziqin	24 February 2003 (aged 23)	9	8	(Chinese Football Association) Jiangsu
24	FW	Yuan Cong	17 April 2000 (aged 25)	6	0	(Football Australia) Western Sydney Wanderers
25	DF	Lyu Yatong	4 November 1996 (aged 29)	1	0	(Chinese Football Association) Shandong
26	MF	Zhang Rui	17 January 1989 (aged 37)	154	30	(Chinese Football Association) Shandong

=== North Korea ===
Head coach: Ri Song-ho

North Korea's 24-player squad was announced by the AFC on 25 February 2026.

No.	Pos.	Player	Date of birth (age)	Caps	Goals	Club
1	GK	Pak Ju-mi	1 July 2003 (aged 22)	8	0	(DPR Korea Football Association) Naegohyang
2	DF	Ri Myong-gum	1 January 2003 (aged 23)	16	2	(DPR Korea Football Association) April 25
3	DF	Ri Kum-hyang	22 April 2001 (aged 24)	14	2	(DPR Korea Football Association) Naegohyang
4	MF	Oh Sol-song	30 June 2004 (aged 21)	0	0	(DPR Korea Football Association) April 25
5	DF	An Kuk-hyang (captain)	25 May 2001 (aged 24)	7	0	(DPR Korea Football Association) April 25
6	MF	An Pok-yong	10 January 2002 (aged 24)	3	0	(DPR Korea Football Association) April 25
7	MF	Myong Yu-jong	29 August 2003 (aged 22)	21	11	(DPR Korea Football Association) April 25
8	FW	Choe Il-son	1 January 2007 (aged 19)	0	0	(DPR Korea Football Association) April 25
9	MF	Kim Song-gyong	12 February 2005 (aged 21)	6	3	(DPR Korea Football Association) April 25
10	FW	Ri Hak	12 June 2002 (aged 23)	18	13	(DPR Korea Football Association) April 25
11	FW	Han Jin-hong	16 February 2002 (aged 24)	14	9	(DPR Korea Football Association) April 25
12	MF	Hong Song-ok	21 August 2003 (aged 22)	20	9	(DPR Korea Football Association) April 25
13	MF	Jon Ryong-jong	25 July 2004 (aged 21)	4	0	(DPR Korea Football Association) April 25
14	DF	Hwang Yu-yong	13 April 2006 (aged 19)	5	0	(DPR Korea Football Association) April 25
15	DF	Jo Pom-mi	26 March 2003 (aged 22)	3	0	(DPR Korea Football Association) April 25
16	MF	Song Chun-sim	29 May 2002 (aged 23)	5	3	(DPR Korea Football Association) April 25
17	FW	Kim Kyong-yong	3 November 2003 (aged 22)	18	26	(DPR Korea Football Association) Naegohyang
18	GK	Yu Son-gum	8 November 2003 (aged 22)	9	0	(DPR Korea Football Association) April 25
19	FW	Sin Hyang	16 July 2005 (aged 20)	2	0	(DPR Korea Football Association) Naegohyang
21	GK	Kim Jong-sun	13 October 2003 (aged 22)	0	0	(DPR Korea Football Association) April 25
20	MF	Chae Un-yong	12 April 2004 (aged 21)	4	1	(DPR Korea Football Association) Wolmido
22	MF	Kim Hye-yong	11 March 2003 (aged 22)	13	8	(DPR Korea Football Association) Naegohyang
23	DF	Ri Hye-gyong	24 September 1999 (aged 26)	19	1	(DPR Korea Football Association) April 25
24	FW	Ri Song-a	22 June 1999 (aged 26)	0	0	(Japan Football Association) Sanfrecce Hiroshima

=== Uzbekistan ===
Head coach: (Lithuania) Kotryna Kulbytė

Uzbekistan announced their 26-player squad on 25 February 2026.

No.	Pos.	Player	Date of birth (age)	Caps	Goals	Club
1	GK	Maftuna Jonimqulova	26 July 1999 (aged 26)	17	0	(Uzbekistan Football Association) Nasaf
2	DF	Madina Khikmatova	9 August 2001 (aged 24)	12	1	(Uzbekistan Football Association) Nasaf
3	DF	Kholida Dadaboeva	12 April 1993 (aged 32)	0	0	(Uzbekistan Football Association) Qizilqum
4	DF	Shodiya Tosheva	14 May 1997 (aged 28)	0	0	(Uzbekistan Football Association) Nasaf
5	MF	Solikha Khusniddinova	22 January 1998 (aged 28)	4	1	(Uzbekistan Football Association) Nasaf
6	DF	Dilrabo Asadova	22 December 1996 (aged 29)	7	0	(Russian Football Union) Zvezda-2005
7	FW	Nilufar Kudratova	5 June 1997 (aged 28)	38	36	(Uzbekistan Football Association) Nasaf
8	MF	Ilvina Ablyakimova	27 April 1995 (aged 30)	19	3	(Uzbekistan Football Association) Nasaf
9	MF	Feruza Turdiboeva	6 January 1994 (aged 32)	10	5	(Uzbekistan Football Association) AGMK
10	FW	Diyorakhon Khabibullaeva	15 October 1999 (aged 26)	37	43	(Turkish Football Federation) Trabzonspor
11	DF	Maftuna Shoyimova	1 January 1999 (aged 27)	34	12	(Uzbekistan Football Association) Nasaf
12	GK	Kumushoy Gulomova	6 November 1999 (aged 26)	3	0	(Uzbekistan Football Association) Qizilqum
13	GK	Zarina Saidova	19 September 2001 (aged 24)	2	0	(Uzbekistan Football Association) Nasaf
14	MF	Gulzoda Amirova	13 October 1999 (aged 26)	5	0	(Uzbekistan Football Association) Nasaf
15	MF	Umida Zoirova	22 April 1998 (aged 27)	28	7	(Uzbekistan Football Association) Nasaf
16	MF	Zarina Mamatkarimova	4 March 2004 (aged 21)	17	5	(Uzbekistan Football Association) Nasaf
17	FW	Lyudmila Karachik (captain)	8 December 1994 (aged 31)	30	38	(Uzbekistan Football Association) Nasaf
18	FW	Dildora Nozimova	3 November 1997 (aged 28)	7	3	(Uzbekistan Football Association) Qizilqum
19	DF	Laylo Tilovova	8 March 1997 (aged 28)	9	0	(Uzbekistan Football Association) Nasaf
20	DF	Kamila Zaripova	19 November 1998 (aged 27)	20	2	(Uzbekistan Football Association) AGMK
21	DF	Leyla Oraniyazova	18 October 2004 (aged 21)	10	0	(Uzbekistan Football Association) AGMK
22	DF	Sevinch Kuchkorova	28 September 2004 (aged 21)	12	1	(Uzbekistan Football Association) AGMK
23	MF	Asalkhon Aminjanova	22 April 2007 (aged 18)	10	10	(Uzbekistan Football Association) AGMK
24	FW	Ominakhon Valikhanova	4 June 2004 (aged 21)	1	0	(Uzbekistan Football Association) Lokomotiv
25	DF	Rukhshona Usarova	26 July 2007 (aged 18)	7	0	(Uzbekistan Football Association) Sogdiana
26	MF	Diyora Bakhtiyarova	29 August 2007 (aged 18)	9	5	(Uzbekistan Football Association) Bunyodkor

== Group C ==
=== Chinese Taipei ===
Head coach: (Thailand) Prasobchoke Chokemor

Chinese Taipei's 26-player squad was announced by the AFC on 25 February 2026.

No.	Pos.	Player	Date of birth (age)	Caps	Goals	Club
1	GK	Wang Yu-ting	27 May 2001 (aged 24)			(Chinese Taipei Football Association) New Taipei Hang Yuen
2	DF	Chang Chi-lan	18 September 1996 (aged 29)			(Chinese Taipei Football Association) Taichung Blue Whale
3	DF	Su Sin-yun	20 November 1996 (aged 29)			(Chinese Taipei Football Association) New Taipei Hang Yuen
4	DF	Lin Yu-syuan	26 February 2003 (aged 23)			(Chinese Taipei Football Association) Taichung Blue Whale
5	DF	Pan Shin-yu	3 May 1997 (aged 28)			(Chinese Taipei Football Association) Kaohsiung Attackers
6	DF	Teng Pei-lin	10 June 2002 (aged 23)			(Chinese Taipei Football Association) New Taipei Hang Yuen
7	FW	Ting Chi	16 November 2000 (aged 25)			(Chinese Taipei Football Association) Taichung Blue Whale
8	FW	Li Yi-wen	20 September 2005 (aged 20)			(Chinese Taipei Football Association) Sunny Bank AC Taipei
9	MF	Hsu Yi-yun	29 April 1997 (aged 28)			(Chinese Taipei Football Association) Sunny Bank AC Taipei
10	MF	Saki Matsunaga	26 December 1995 (aged 30)			(Chinese Taipei Football Association) New Taipei Hang Yuen
11	FW	He Jia-shiuan	7 May 2005 (aged 20)			(Chinese Taipei Football Association) New Taipei Hang Yuen
12	DF	Pu Hsin-hui	12 September 2005 (aged 20)			(Chinese Taipei Football Association) New Taipei Hang Yuen
13	MF	Chan Pi-han	27 April 1992 (aged 33)			(Chinese Taipei Football Association) Kaohsiung Attackers
14	DF	Wu Kai-Ching	14 November 1999 (aged 26)			(Chinese Taipei Football Association) Kaohsiung Attackers
15	FW	Tseng Yun-ching	14 February 2000 (aged 26)			(Chinese Taipei Football Association) Sunny Bank AC Taipei
16	FW	Liu Yu-chiao	14 December 2005 (aged 20)			(Chinese Taipei Football Association) New Taipei Hang Yuen
17	FW	Chen Jin-wen	13 June 2003 (aged 22)			(Chinese Taipei Football Association) Kaohsiung Attackers
18	GK	Wu Hsin-ni	16 November 2005 (aged 20)			(Chinese Taipei Football Association) Valkyrie
19	FW	Su Yu-hsuan	21 February 2001 (aged 25)			(Chinese Football Association) Henan Jianye
20	DF	Chen Ying-hui (captain)	5 October 1998 (aged 27)			(Chinese Taipei Football Association) Taichung Blue Whale
21	MF	Chen Yu-chin	5 August 2007 (aged 18)			(Chinese Taipei Football Association) Kaohsiung Attackers
22	MF	Huang Ke-sin	18 July 2003 (aged 22)			(Chinese Taipei Football Association) Taichung Blue Whale
23	GK	Chiu I-hsiu	22 July 2005 (aged 20)			(Chinese Taipei Football Association) Sunny Bank AC Taipei
24	DF	Pan Yen-hsin	18 February 1996 (aged 30)			(Chinese Taipei Football Association) New Taipei Hang Yuen
25	MF	Wang Hsiang-huei	28 September 1987 (aged 38)			(Chinese Taipei Football Association) Hualien
26	FW	Yang Hsiao-chuan	23 September 2005 (aged 20)			(Chinese Taipei Football Association) Hualien

=== India ===
Head coach: (Costa Rica) Amelia Valverde

India announced their 26-player squad on 20 February 2026. On 24 February 2026, Anju Tamang withdrew from the squad due to injury and was replaced by Karishma Shirvoikar.

No.	Pos.	Player	Date of birth (age)	Caps	Goals	Club
1	GK	Panthoi Chanu Elangbam	1 February 1996 (aged 30)	26	0	(All India Football Federation) East Bengal
2	DF	Sweety Devi Ngangbam (captain)	1 December 1999 (aged 26)	67	1	(All India Football Federation) East Bengal
3	DF	Astam Oraon	5 February 2005 (aged 21)	7	0	(All India Football Federation) East Bengal
4	DF	Shilky Devi Hemam	23 November 2005 (aged 20)	27	1	(All India Football Federation) East Bengal
5	DF	Juli Kishan	8 May 1999 (aged 26)	9	0	(All India Football Federation) Nita
6	MF	Sangita Basfore	12 July 1996 (aged 29)	72	9	(All India Football Federation) East Bengal
7	FW	Soumya Guguloth	18 January 2001 (aged 25)	37	7	(All India Football Federation) East Bengal
8	DF	Sanju Yadav	12 September 1997 (aged 28)	62	11	(All India Football Federation) Sribhumi
9	FW	Karishma Shirvoikar	4 August 2001 (aged 24)	14	1	(All India Football Federation) Sribhumi
10	FW	Pyari Xaxa	18 May 1997 (aged 28)	39	18	(All India Football Federation) Nita
11	FW	Grace Dangmei	5 February 1996 (aged 30)	92	23	(All India Football Federation) Sribhumi
12	FW	Lynda Kom	28 February 2005 (aged 21)	10	5	(All India Football Federation) Sethu
13	GK	Sowmiya Narayanasamy	25 July 2000 (aged 25)	3	0	(All India Football Federation) Gokulam Kerala
14	DF	Nirmala Devi Phanjoubam	2 March 2003 (aged 22)	9	1	(All India Football Federation) Sethu
15	DF	Martina Thokchom	13 July 2004 (aged 21)	15	0	(All India Football Federation) Sethu
16	FW	Manisha Kalyan	27 November 2001 (aged 24)	48	14	(Peruvian Football Federation) Alianza Lima
17	FW	Rimpa Haldar	6 February 2005 (aged 21)	10	2	(All India Football Federation) Sribhumi
18	MF	Jasoda Munda	3 April 2001 (aged 24)	0	0	(All India Football Federation) Odisha
19	MF	Aveka Singh	30 December 2003 (aged 22)	0	0	(Danish Football Association) Næstved HG
20	MF	Sanfida Nongrum	26 April 2005 (aged 20)	0	0	(All India Football Federation) Garhwal United
21	DF	Sarita Yumnam	4 February 2002 (aged 24)	0	0	(All India Football Federation) East Bengal
22	DF	Sushmita Lepcha	19 March 1996 (aged 29)	0	0	(All India Football Federation) East Bengal
23	GK	Shreya Hooda	25 May 1999 (aged 26)	15	0	(All India Football Federation) Gokulam Kerala
24	MF	Babina Devi Lisham	1 February 2005 (aged 21)	5	0	(All India Football Federation) Sethu
25	FW	Malavika Prasad	12 November 2003 (aged 22)	5	1	(All India Football Federation) Sethu
26	FW	Kaviya Pakkirisamy	23 December 2002 (aged 23)	0	0	(All India Football Federation) Sethu

=== Japan ===
Head coach: (Denmark) Nils Nielsen

Japan announced their 26-player squad on 12 February 2026.

No.	Pos.	Player	Date of birth (age)	Caps	Goals	Club
1	GK	Ayaka Yamashita	29 September 1995 (aged 30)	83	0	(The Football Association) Manchester City
2	DF	Risa Shimizu	15 June 1996 (aged 29)	82	4	(The Football Association) Liverpool
3	DF	Moeka Minami	7 December 1998 (aged 27)	63	5	(The Football Association) Brighton & Hove Albion
4	DF	Saki Kumagai	17 October 1990 (aged 35)	163	3	(The Football Association) London City Lionesses
5	DF	Hana Takahashi	19 February 2000 (aged 26)	41	5	(Japan Football Association) Urawa Reds
6	DF	Tōko Koga	6 January 2006 (aged 20)	21	2	(The Football Association) Tottenham Hotspur
7	MF	Hinata Miyazawa	28 November 1999 (aged 26)	51	9	(The Football Association) Manchester United
8	MF	Kiko Seike	8 August 1996 (aged 29)	32	9	(The Football Association) Brighton & Hove Albion
9	FW	Riko Ueki	30 July 1999 (aged 26)	45	12	(The Football Association) West Ham United
10	MF	Fuka Nagano	9 March 1999 (aged 26)	52	1	(The Football Association) Liverpool
11	FW	Mina Tanaka	28 April 1994 (aged 31)	95	44	(United States Soccer Federation) Utah Royals
12	GK	Chika Hirao	31 December 1996 (aged 29)	12	0	(Royal Spanish Football Federation) Granada
13	DF	Hikaru Kitagawa	10 May 1997 (aged 28)	21	2	(The Football Association) Everton
14	MF	Yui Hasegawa (captain)	29 January 1997 (aged 29)	95	21	(The Football Association) Manchester City
15	MF	Aoba Fujino	27 January 2004 (aged 22)	34	8	(The Football Association) Manchester City
16	DF	Yuzuki Yamamoto	1 September 2002 (aged 23)	5	0	(Japan Football Association) Tokyo Verdy Beleza
17	MF	Maika Hamano	9 May 2004 (aged 21)	24	6	(The Football Association) Tottenham Hotspur
18	MF	Honoka Hayashi	19 May 1998 (aged 27)	38	2	(The Football Association) Everton
19	MF	Momoko Tanikawa	7 May 2005 (aged 20)	13	3	(German Football Association) Bayern Munich
20	MF	Manaka Matsukubo	28 July 2004 (aged 21)	8	0	(United States Soccer Federation) North Carolina Courage
21	DF	Miyabi Moriya	22 August 1996 (aged 29)	20	2	(United States Soccer Federation) Utah Royals
22	DF	Rion Ishikawa	4 July 2003 (aged 22)	13	0	(The Football Association) Everton
23	GK	Akane Okuma	15 September 2004 (aged 21)	1	0	(Japan Football Association) INAC Kobe Leonessa
24	MF	Yui Narumiya	22 February 1995 (aged 31)	12	5	(Japan Football Association) INAC Kobe Leonessa
25	FW	Remina Chiba	30 April 1999 (aged 26)	20	4	(German Football Association) Eintracht Frankfurt
26	FW	Maya Hijikata	13 April 2004 (aged 21)	5	2	(The Football Association) Aston Villa

=== Vietnam ===
Head coach: Mai Đức Chung

Vietnam announced their preliminary 28-player squad on 13 January 2026. The final squad was announced on 26 February 2026.

No.	Pos.	Player	Date of birth (age)	Caps	Goals	Club
1	GK	Đoàn Thị Ngọc Phượng	1 February 1998 (aged 28)	0	0	(Vietnam Football Federation) Ho Chi Minh City
2	DF	Lương Thị Thu Thương	1 May 2000 (aged 25)	39	0	(Vietnam Football Federation) Than KSVN
3	MF	Trần Nhật Lan	1 January 2004 (aged 22)	0	0	(Vietnam Football Federation) Than KSVN
4	DF	Trần Thị Thu	15 January 1991 (aged 35)	46	2	(Vietnam Football Federation) Thai Nguyen T&T
5	DF	Hoàng Thị Loan	6 February 1995 (aged 31)	49	3	(Vietnam Football Federation) Hanoi
6	DF	Nguyễn Thị Hoa	28 November 2000 (aged 25)	4	0	(Vietnam Football Federation) Hanoi
7	FW	Ngọc Minh Chuyên	23 June 2004 (aged 21)	3	1	(Vietnam Football Federation) Thai Nguyen T&T
8	MF	Nguyễn Thị Trúc Hương	4 March 2000 (aged 25)	11	1	(Vietnam Football Federation) Than KSVN
9	FW	Huỳnh Như (captain)	28 November 1991 (aged 34)	116	69	(Vietnam Football Federation) Ho Chi Minh City
10	DF	Trần Thị Hải Linh	8 June 2001 (aged 24)	31	1	(Vietnam Football Federation) Hanoi
11	MF	Thái Thị Thảo	12 February 1995 (aged 31)	58	9	(Vietnam Football Federation) Hanoi
12	FW	Phạm Hải Yến	9 November 1994 (aged 31)	92	54	(Vietnam Football Federation) Hanoi
13	DF	Lê Thị Diễm My	6 March 1994 (aged 31)	30	0	(Vietnam Football Federation) Than KSVN
14	GK	Trần Thị Kim Thanh	18 September 1993 (aged 32)	61	0	(Vietnam Football Federation) Ho Chi Minh City
15	DF	Trần Thị Duyên	28 December 2000 (aged 25)	14	1	(Vietnam Football Federation) Phong Phu Ha Nam
16	MF	Dương Thị Vân	20 September 1994 (aged 31)	56	3	(Vietnam Football Federation) Than KSVN
17	DF	Trần Thị Thu Thảo	15 January 1993 (aged 33)	57	5	(Vietnam Football Federation) Ho Chi Minh City
18	MF	Cù Thị Huỳnh Như	7 August 2000 (aged 25)	5	0	(Vietnam Football Federation) Ho Chi Minh City
19	MF	Nguyễn Thị Thanh Nhã	25 September 2001 (aged 24)	39	7	(Vietnam Football Federation) Hanoi
20	GK	Khổng Thị Hằng	10 October 1993 (aged 32)	34	0	(Vietnam Football Federation) Than KSVN
21	MF	Ngân Thị Vạn Sự	29 April 2001 (aged 24)	43	11	(Vietnam Football Federation) Hanoi
22	DF	Nguyễn Thị Mỹ Anh	27 November 1994 (aged 31)	34	1	(Vietnam Football Federation) Thai Nguyen T&T
23	MF	Nguyễn Thị Bích Thùy	1 May 1994 (aged 31)	81	20	(Vietnam Football Federation) Thai Nguyen T&T
24	FW	Nguyễn Thị Thúy Hằng	19 November 1997 (aged 28)	20	6	(Vietnam Football Federation) Than KSVN
25	FW	Nguyễn Thị Tuyết Ngân	10 February 2000 (aged 26)	10	1	(Vietnam Football Federation) Ho Chi Minh City
26	MF	Vũ Thị Hoa	6 November 2003 (aged 22)	7	0	(Vietnam Football Federation) Hanoi
