= Grace Adams =

Ghanaian professional footballer (born 1995)

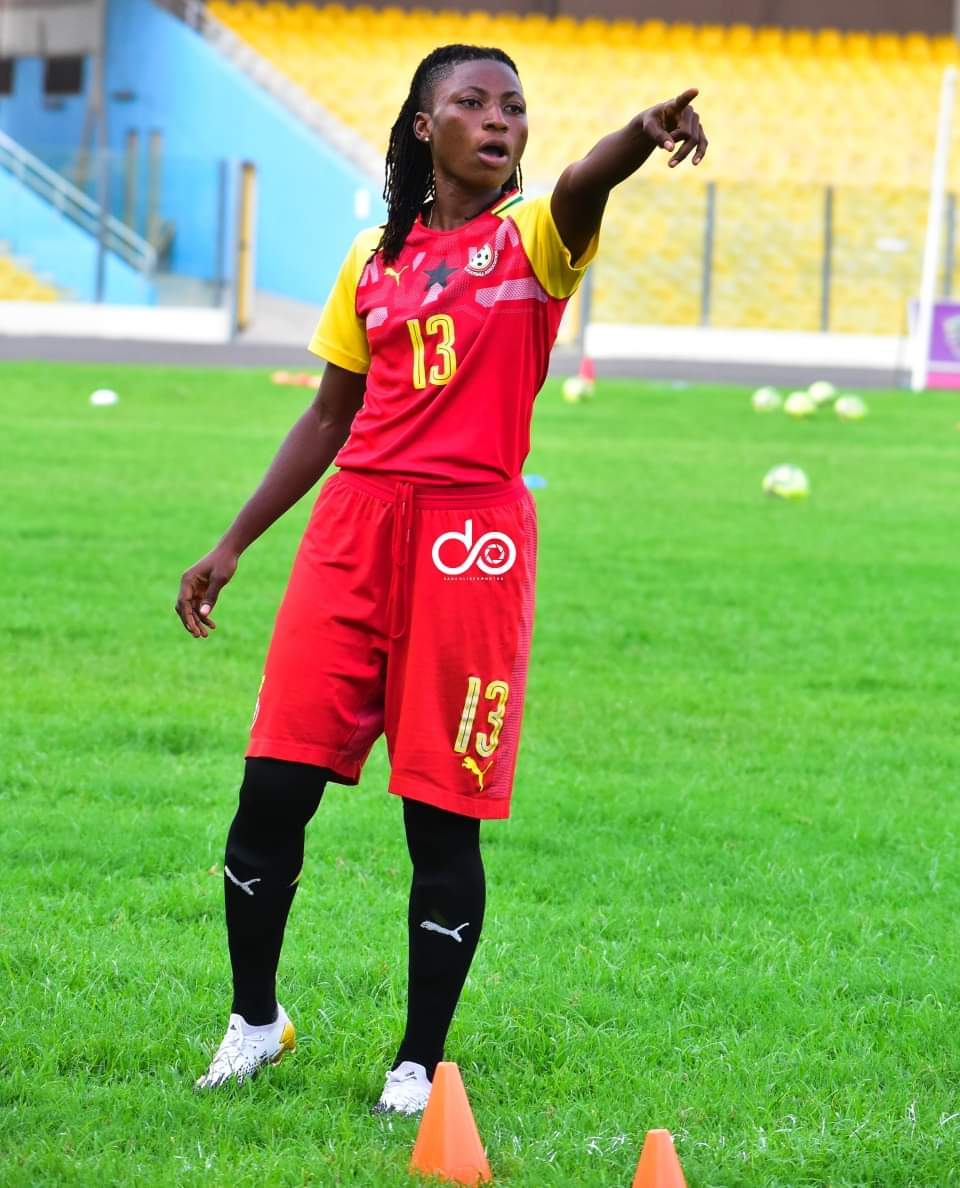
- Adams with Ghana in 2021

Personal information
- Date of birth: 2 November 1995 (age 31)
- Place of birth: Accra, Ghana
- Height: 1.65 m (5 ft 5 in)
- Positions: Midfielder; defender

Team information
- Current team: FC Nasaf
- Number: 6

Youth career
- 2010–2012: Dansoman Ladies FC
- Post Ladies FC

College career
Years	Team	Apps	(Gls)
2015–2018	South Florida Bulls	60	(4)

Senior career*
Years	Team	Apps	(Gls)
2012–2015	Prison Ladies	20	(10)
2019–2020	Rivers Angels		
2020	SAS	7	(0)
2020–2021	Berry Ladies	15	(3)
2021– 2022	BIIK Shymkent	10	(3)
2023–	FC Nasaf		

International career
2010	Ghana U17	1	(0)
2012–2014	Ghana U20	4	(0)
2017–	Ghana	1	(0)
- * Club domestic league appearances and goals

Grace Adams (born 2 November 1995) is a Ghanaian professional soccer player who plays as a midfielder and central defender for Uzbekistan Women's League club FC Nasaf and the Ghana women's national team. She went to school in America University of South Florida, playing and studying (2015–2019). She is now a degree holder in interdisciplinary social science. She once captained the Ghana Black Princesses (U20) into the FIFA U20 Women's World Cup held in Canada 2014.

== Early life ==
Born to Robert and Elizabeth in the Central Region suburb of Edumfa, Cape Coast. Adams was raised with her one older sister and four older brothers in the suburb of Edumfa and relocated to Accra. she was a multi-sport athlete growing up and began playing soccer at an early age with boys (VIP Stars FC) team in her area.

Adams attended a cluster of school odorkor 4&5 basic, where she was a first choice athlete in several sports and was named an all-time interschools athlete. At the school she was known for her activeness and soccer abilities. She later credited the program as an integral part of her development as a soccer player. Programs like inter-schools games and All regional games helped her develop a strong mentality because she played with best players and learned from the best coaches.

In 2008 at age 13, Adams was called up to the Ghana under 17 national team camp at the Ghanaman Soccer Center of Excellence Prampram. Unfortunately, Adams couldn't make up to the team for the first edition of FIFA U17 world Cup. In 2010, Adams was called up for the qualifiers for U17 world Cup held in Trinidad and Tobago and she made the team for the qualifiers and the World Cup as well. That is where her national career started.

== Club career ==
Adams began her career in Ghana at Prison Ladies, before moving to the United States to continue her education and career as a student athlete. She enrolled in the University of South Florida from 2015 to 2018, playing for the South Florida Bulls in the American Athletic Conference. She won the 2017 season.

Shortly after graduating early from the University of South Florida, she reinstated to Ghana. On 16 August 2019, she joined Nigeria Women Premier League side Rivers Angels on a one-year deal.

On 24 January 2020 Adams moved to Lebanon, signing for SAS mid-2019–20 season season. She played seven matches for her new club, assisting five goals; she helped her side win the league.

Adams returned to Ghana, played for Berry Ladies in the National Women's League. for one season, they were second on the table in the Southern Zone. Competing with Hasaacas Ladies fc for the first position but Hasaacas lead by a point to top the league.

In 2021, she joined Kazakhstan championship club BIIK Shymkent. for one season. she won the league title and Kazakhstan championship with the club. she participated in the UEFA Women's League preliminary group stage held in Croatia 2022–23 UEFA Women's Champions League qualifying rounds. Adams won two out of three games with the team but couldn't make it to the next stage. it was her first time experience at the UEFA league.

In mid-season 2023, Adams signed with Uzbekistan Women's Professional league team FC Nasaf. She has been a major player for her club in winning trophies. Throughout the 2023 season, she played in 20 matches and scored 3 goals. The club won the O'zbekistan Ayollar ligasi and the Uzbekistan Women Championship Cup the same year.

Adams returned to Sevinch for the 2024 season. she played an integral role for her club throughout the season and emerge her first trophy of the season at the beginning of the season_Super Kubogi Ayollar Cup

== International career ==
Grace Adams first international appearance for Ghana was in 2010 at the second edition of the FIFA U-17 Women's World Cup held in Trinidad and Tobago. Ghana was in the group with Brazil, Canada, and Republic of Ireland(Group D) 2010 FIFA U-17 Women's World Cup squads. Adams then progressed to the U20 team who qualified to the 2012 FIFA U-20 Women's World Cup in a group with China PR, United States of America, and Germany 2012 FIFA U-20 Women's World Cup squads. In Adams's second appearance at the U20 level, she captained the team to the 2014 FIFA U-20 Women's World Cup. They were eliminated from the group stage with a six(6) points same as the host national but Canada lead them by a margin of one(1) goal difference. Their group were Finland, Canada, and North Korea 2014 FIFA U-20 Women's World Cup squads(Group A).

On 30 November 2020, Adams represented the senior team in a friendlies against Morocco, coming on in the 80th minute in a 2–0 win. She then progress with the team to play in Nigeria for a mini tournament Aisha Buhari Cup (2021). It was the initial edition held in Lagos with both FIFA and CAF president honoring the event. The completion was composed with Six teams, Morocco, South Africa, Mali, Cameroon, Ghana, and Nigeria an International competitions in women's association football.

== Honors ==
PFC Sevinch/ Nasaf Fc

- Super Kubogi Ayollar Champions: 2024
- Ayollar Oliy ligasi Winner: 2024
- Uzbekistan Ayollar Ligasi Winner: 2023
- Uzbekistan Women Championship Cup: 2023 & 2024
- Asia Women's Champions League: 2023
- Asia Women's Champions League: 2024–2025

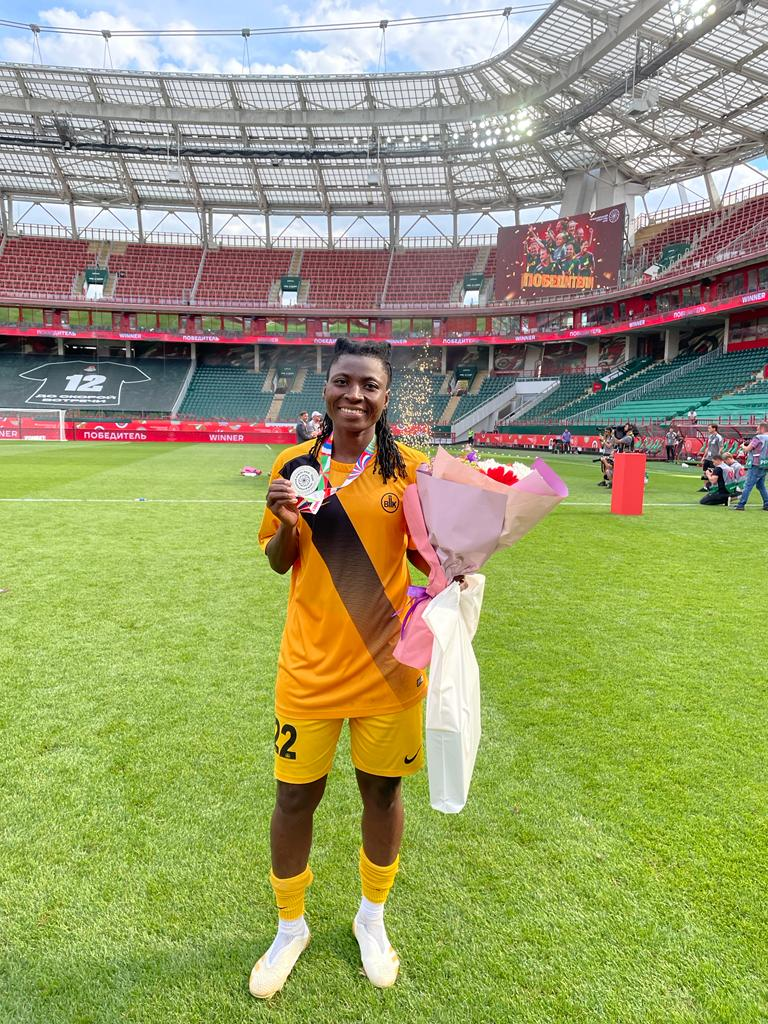
International Cup in Russia, Runner-up BIIK Shymkent

South Florida Bulls

- American Athletic Conference: 2017

SAS

- Lebanese Women's Football League: 2019–20

BIIK Shymkent

- Kazakhstan championship: 2021, 2022
- UEFA Women's Champions League: 2021–22

== See also ==
- List of Ghana women's international footballers
