= 2026 AFC Women's Champions League final =

Football match

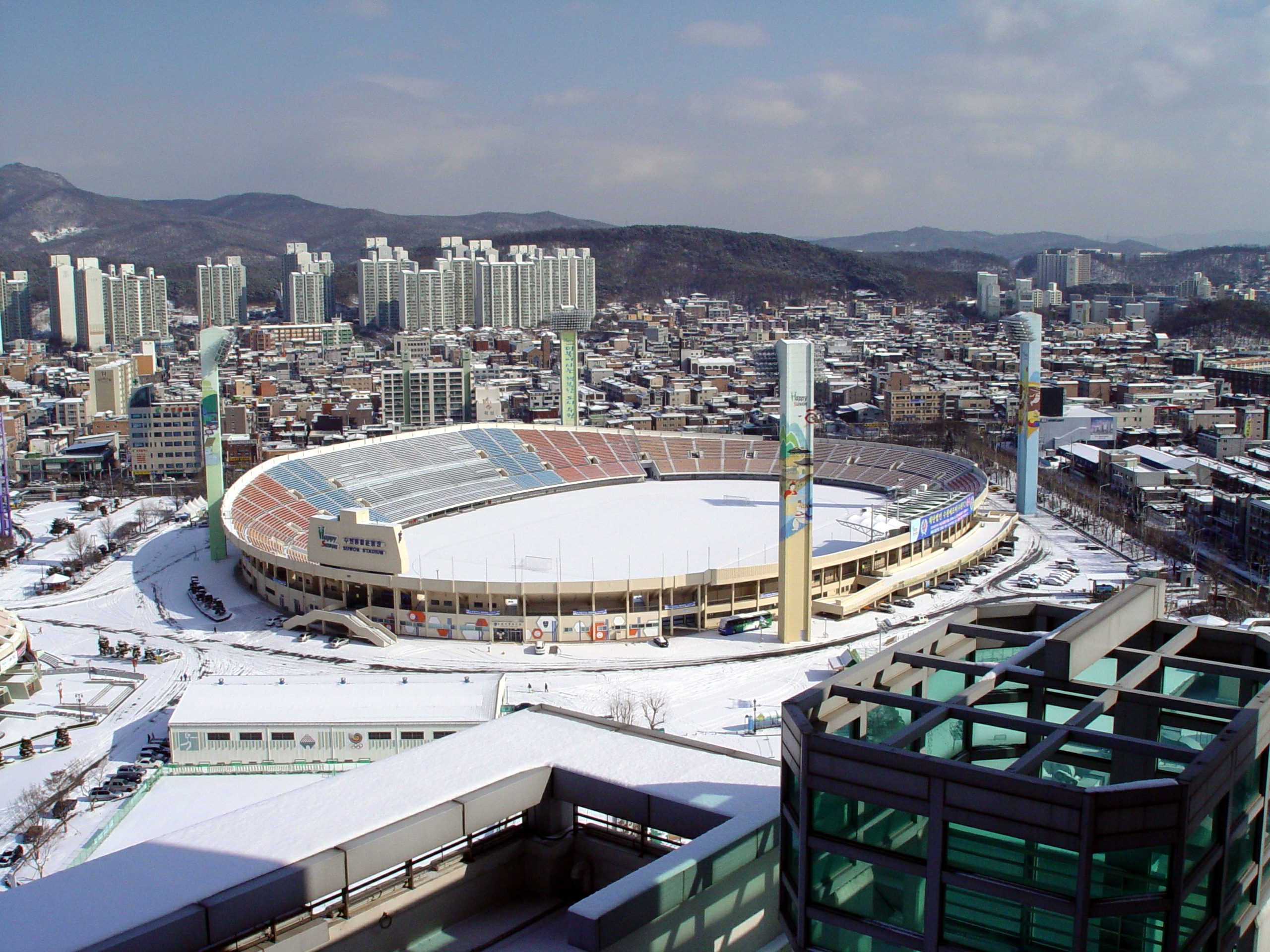
- The Suwon Sports Complex in Suwon, South Korea hosted the final
- Event: 2025–26 AFC Women's Champions League
Tokyo Verdy	Naegohyang
(Japan)	(North Korea)
0	1
- Date: 23 May 2026
- Venue: Suwon Sports Complex, Suwon
- Referee: Supiree Testhomya (Thailand)
- Attendance: 2,670

The 2026 AFC Women's Champions League final was the final match of the 2025–26 AFC Women's Champions League, the 6th season of Asia's premier club women's football tournament organised by the Asian Football Confederation (AFC), and the second since it was rebranded as the AFC Women's Champions League. The match involved Japanese club Tokyo Verdy (WE League champions) and North Korean side Naegohyang (DPR Korea Women's Premier League champions).

Naegohyang's appearance in the 2026 AFC Women's Champions League playoffs received interest. This marks the first time a group of North Korean athletes went to South Korea for a competitive game since the 2018 ITTF World Tour Grand Finals.

Naegohyang won the final and qualified for the 2027 FIFA Women's Champions Cup.

== Teams ==
Team	Region (Federation)	Previous finals appearances (bold indicates winners)
(Japan) Tokyo Verdy	East (EAFF)	**2019***
(North Korea) Naegohyang	East (EAFF)	None

- (*) As the AFC Women's Club Championship

== Venue ==
The semi-final and final venue was pre-determined, with the match played in Suwon, South Korea.

== Route to the final ==
Tokyo Verdy (Japan)		Round	(North Korea) Naegohyang	
Opponent	Result	Preliminary stage	Opponent	Result
Bye		Matchday 1	(Laos) Master	11–0
Bye		Matchday 2	(Bhutan) RTC	7–0
Bye		Matchday 3	(Chinese Taipei) Kaohsiung Attackers	3–0
—N/a		Final standings	**Group D winners**: Pos / Team / Pld / Pts; **1** / (DPR Korea Football Association) Naegohyang / **3** / **9**; 2 / (Chinese Taipei Football Association) Kaohsiung Attackers / 3 / **6**; 3 / (Bhutan Football Federation) RTC / 3 / **3**; 4 / (Lao Football Federation) Master (H) / 3 / **0**; Source: AFC (H) Hosts	
Opponent	Result	Group stage	Opponent	Result
(North Korea) Naegohyang	4–0	Matchday 1	(Japan) Tokyo Verdy	0–4
(Myanmar) ISPE	1–0	Matchday 2	(South Korea) Suwon	3–0
(South Korea) Suwon	0–0	Matchday 3	(Myanmar) ISPE	3–0
**Group C winners**: Pos / Team / Pld / Pts; **1** / (Japan Football Association) Tokyo Verdy / **3** / **7**; 2 / (DPR Korea Football Association) Naegohyang / 3 / **6**; 3 / (Korea Football Association) Suwon / 3 / **4**; 4 / (Myanmar Football Federation) ISPE (H) / 3 / **0**; Source: AFC (H) Hosts		Final standings	**Group C runners-up**: Pos / Team / Pld / Pts; 1 / (Japan Football Association) Tokyo Verdy / 3 / **7**; **2** / (DPR Korea Football Association) Naegohyang / **3** / **6**; 3 / (Korea Football Association) Suwon / 3 / **4**; 4 / (Myanmar Football Federation) ISPE (H) / 3 / **0**; Source: AFC (H) Hosts	
Opponent	Result	Knockout stage	Opponent	Result
(Philippines) Stallion Laguna	5–0	Quarter-finals	(Vietnam) Hồ Chí Minh City	3–0
(Australia) Melbourne City	3–1	Semi-finals	(South Korea) Suwon	2–1

== Match ==
=== Details ===
23 May 2026
14:00 UTC+9

Tokyo Verdy (Japan Football Association)	0–1	(DPR Korea Football Association) Naegohyang
	Report	Kim Kyong-yong 44'

Suwon Sports Complex, Suwon
Attendance: 2,670
Referee: Supiree Testhomya (Thailand)

**Tokyo Verdy**	**Naegohyang**

== See also ==
- 2026 AFC Champions League Elite final
- 2026 AFC Champions League Two final
- 2026 AFC Challenge League final
- Politics and sports
