= 2025–26 AFC Women's Champions League =

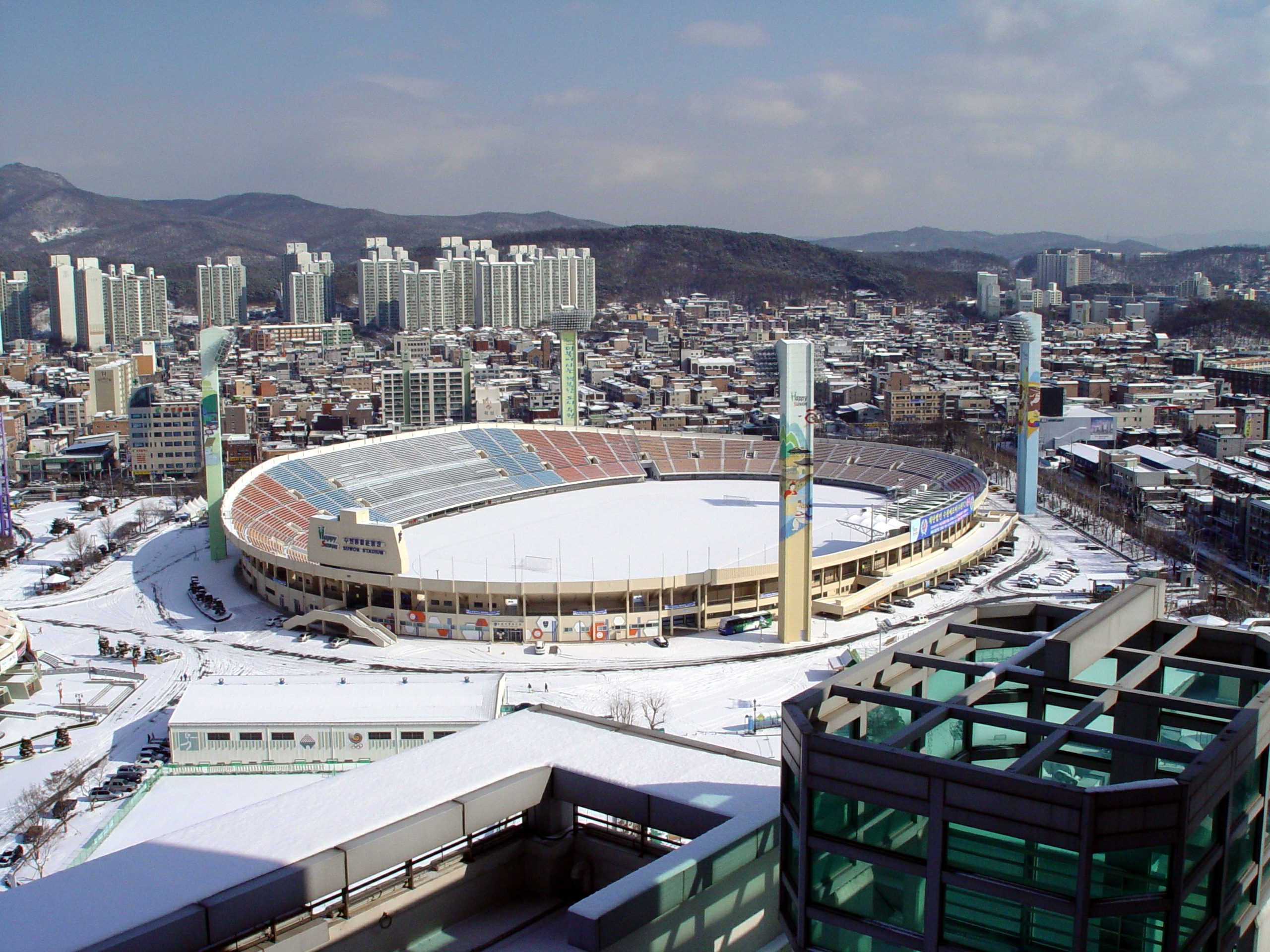
- Suwon Sports Complex in Suwon hosted the final

Tournament details
- Dates: Preliminary stage: 25–31 August 2025; Competition proper: 3 October 2025 – 23 May 2026
- Teams: Competition proper: 12; Total: 26 (from 26 associations)

Final positions
- Champions: (North Korea) Naegohyang (1st title)
- Runners-up: (Japan) Tokyo Verdy Beleza

Tournament statistics
- Matches played: 52
- Goals scored: 207 (3.98 per match)
- Attendance: 77,547 (1,491 per match)
- Top scorer(s): (Australia) Holly McNamara (North Korea) Kim Kyong-yong (4 goals each)
- Best player: (North Korea) Kim Kyong-yong
- Fair play award: (Vietnam Football Federation) Hồ Chí Minh City

The 2025–26 AFC Women's Champions League was the second edition of the AFC Women's Champions League, Asia's premier club women's football tournament organized by the Asian Football Confederation (AFC).

Wuhan Jiangda were the defending champions, but were eliminated by Suwon in quarter finals.

Naegohyang became the champions for the first time. They qualified for the 2026–27 AFC Women's Champions League, the 2027 FIFA Women's Champions Cup and the 2028 FIFA Women's Club World Cup.

== Association team allocation ==
There was one entry per participating member association, with allocation based on AFC Women's Club ranking made with 70% of AFC club points and 30% of national team points as per FIFA Women's World Ranking. Teams from the top seven ranked associations qualified directly to the group stage, with the remaining teams starting from the preliminary stage.

Rank	Member association	Points	Slots	
Rank	Member association	Points	Group stage	Play-in qualifier
1	Australia	97.662	1	0
2	South Korea	75.852	1	0
3	Japan	74.800	1	0
4	China	74.583	1	0
5	Vietnam	70.393	1	0
6	United Arab Emirates	50.763	0 ~~(1)~~	0
7	Iran	50.389	1	0
8	Chinese Taipei	48.149	0	1
9	Philippines	37.175	0	1
10	Thailand	33.771	0	1
11	India	30.737	0	1
12	Malaysia	30.443	0	1
13	North Korea	29.136	0	1
14	Uzbekistan	24.634	0	1
15	Myanmar	23.653	0	1
16	Jordan	22.008	0	1
17	Hong Kong	21.376	0	1
18	Laos	19.960	0	1
19	Nepal	19.831	0	1
22	Guam	18.077	0	1
23	Singapore	17.618	0	1
24	Cambodia	17.245	0	1
25	Mongolia	16.541	0	1
26	Saudi Arabia	16.425	0	1
29	Kyrgyzstan	16.343	0	1
33	Bhutan	14.382	0	1
Total	Participating associations: 25		6	19
Total	Participating associations: 25		25	

Associations that did not enter a team:

- Afghanistan
- Bahrain
- Bangladesh
- Brunei
- Indonesia
- Iraq
- Kuwait
- Lebanon
- Macau
- Maldives
- Northern Mariana Islands
- Oman
- Pakistan
- Palestine
- Qatar
- Sri Lanka
- Syria
- Tajikistan
- Timor-Leste
- Turkmenistan
- United Arab Emirates (W)
- Yemen

Legend

Did not participate

W: withdrew before the draw

== Format ==
The competition consists of the following:

- A preliminary stage (one group of three and four groups of four teams) in centralised venues;
- A main tournament with 12 teams (three groups of four teams) in centralised venues;
- Quarter-finals hosted by the group winners and the best second-placed team;
- Semi-finals and final in a centralised venue.

=== Tiebreakers ===
Teams in the preliminary stage and the group stage are ranked according to points (3 points for a win, 1 point for a draw, 0 points for a loss). If two or more teams are tied on points, the following tiebreaking criteria are applied, in the order given, to determine the rankings:

1. Points in head-to-head matches among the tied teams;
2. Goal difference in head-to-head matches among the tied teams;
3. Goals scored in head-to-head matches among the tied teams;
4. If more than two teams are tied, and after applying all head-to-head criteria above, a subset of teams are still tied, all head-to-head criteria above are reapplied exclusively to this subset of teams;
5. Goal difference in all group matches;
6. Goals scored in all group matches;
7. Penalty shoot-out, if only two teams are tied, and the teams in question have played their last group match against each other;
8. Lower disciplinary score (direct red card = 3 points; double yellow card = 3 points; single yellow card = 1 point);
9. Drawing of lots.

== Schedule ==
Stage	Round	Draw date	Dates
Preliminary stage	Matchday 1	3 July 2025	25 August 2025
Preliminary stage	Matchday 2	3 July 2025	28 August 2025
Preliminary stage	Matchday 3	3 July 2025	31 August 2025
Group stage	Matchday 1	11 September 2025	13 November 2025 (Group A); 17 November 2025 (Group B); 9 November 2025 (Group C)
Group stage	Matchday 2	11 September 2025	16 November 2025 (Group A); 20 November 2025 (Group B); 12 November 2025 (Group C)
Group stage	Matchday 3	11 September 2025	19 November 2025 (Group A); 23 November 2025 (Group B); 15 November 2025 (Group C)
Knockout stage	Quarter-finals	15 January 2026	28–29 March 2026
Knockout stage	Semi-finals	15 January 2026	20 May 2026
Knockout stage	Final	15 January 2026	23 May 2026

== Teams ==
=== Team locations ===
Location of the 2025–26 AFC Women's Champions League teams
Red: Group A; Blue: Group B; Green: Group C; Yellow: eliminated in Preliminary stage

=== Entrants ===
Group stage direct entrants
Team	Qualifying method	App. (last)
(Australia) Melbourne City	2024–25 A-League Women premiers	2nd (2024–25)
(South Korea) Suwon	2024 WK League champions	1st
(Japan) NTV Tokyo Verdy Beleza	2024–25 WE League champions	1st
(China) Wuhan Jiangda	2024 Chinese Women's Super League champions	2nd (2024–25)
(Vietnam) Hồ Chí Minh City	2024 Vietnamese Women's National League champions	2nd (2024–25)
(Iran) Bam Khatoon	2024–25 Kowsar Women's League champions	2nd (2024–25)

Preliminary stage participants
Team	Qualifying method	App. (last)
(Chinese Taipei) Kaohsiung Attackers	2024 Taiwan Mulan Football League champions	1st
(Philippines) Stallion Laguna	2024 PFF Women's Cup champions	1st
(Thailand) College of Asian Scholars	2025 Thai Women's League 1 champions	2nd (2024–25)
(India) East Bengal	2024–25 Indian Women's League champions	1st
(Malaysia) Kelana United	2024 Malaysia National Women's League champions	1st
(North Korea) Naegohyang	2023–24 DPR Korea Women's Premier League champions	1st
(Uzbekistan) Nasaf	2024 Uzbekistan Women's League champions	2nd (2024–25)
(Myanmar) ISPE	2024 Myanmar Women's League champions	1st
(Jordan) Etihad	2024 Jordan Women's Pro League champions	2nd (2024–25)
(Hong Kong) Kitchee	2024–25 Hong Kong Women League champions	2nd (2024–25)
(Laos) Master	2024 Lao Women's League champions	1st
(Nepal) APF	2024 ANFA Women's League champions	2nd (2024–25)
(Guam) Strykers	2025 Women's G League champions	1st
(Singapore) Lion City Sailors	2024 Women's Premier League champions	2nd (2024–25)
(Cambodia) Phnom Penh Crown	2024–25 Cambodian Women's League champions	1st
(Mongolia) Khovd Western	2024 Women's National Football League champions	1st
(Saudi Arabia) Al-Nassr	2024–25 Saudi Women's Premier League champions	2nd (2024–25)
(Kyrgyzstan) Sdyushor SI–Asiagoal	2024 Kyrgyzstan Women's League champions	1st
(Bhutan) Royal Thimphu College	2024 Women's National League champions	2nd (2024–25)

Withdrawn team
Team	Qualifying method
(United Arab Emirates) Abu Dhabi Country Club	2024–25 UAE Women's Football League champions

== Preliminary stage ==
=== Seedings ===
Pot 1	Pot 2	Pot 3	Pot 4
1. (Chinese Taipei) Kaohsiung Attackers; 2. (Philippines) **Stallion Laguna**; 3. (Thailand) College of Asian Scholars; 4. (India) **East Bengal**; 5. (Malaysia) Kelana United **(H)**	6. (DPR Korea Football Association) **Naegohyang**; 7. (Uzbekistan) **Nasaf** **(H)**; 8. (Myanmar) **ISPE** **(H)**; 9. (Jordan) Etihad; 10. (Hong Kong) Kitchee	11. (Laos) Master **(H)**; 12. (Nepal) APF; 13. (Guam) Strykers; 14. **(Singapore) Lion City Sailors**; 15. (Cambodia) Phnom Penh Crown **(H)**	16. (Mongolia) Khovd Western; 17. (Saudi Arabia) Al-Nassr; 18. (Kyrgyzstan) Sdyushor SI–Asiagoal; 19. (Bhutan) Royal Thimphu College

- **Bold** indicates teams qualified for the final tournament

(H) Hosts

=== Group A ===
Pos	Team	Pld	W	D	L	GF	GA	GD	Pts	Qualification
1	(Myanmar) ISPE (H)	3	3	0	0	20	1	+19	**9**	Advance to group stage
2	(Philippines) Stallion Laguna	3	2	0	1	20	4	+16	**6**	Advance to group stage
3	(Mongolia) Khovd Western	3	1	0	2	6	16	−10	**3**	
4	(Guam) Strykers	3	0	0	3	2	27	−25	**0**	

Source: AFC
Rules for classification: Tiebreakers
(H) Hosts
25 August 2025
16:00 UTC+6:30

ISPE (Myanmar)	9–0	(Guam) Strykers
Connelley 5' (o.g.); Yin Loon Eain 8'; May Htet Lu 12'; Lin Myint Mo 16'; Phyu Phyu Win 18', 30'; Shwe Yee Tun 44'; San Thaw Thaw 87'; Moe Moe Than 89'	Report

Thuwunna Stadium, Yangon
Attendance: 5,700
Referee: Esraa Al-Mbaiden (Jordan)
25 August 2025
19:00 UTC+6:30

Stallion Laguna (Philippines)	6–1	(Mongolia) Khovd Western
C. McDaniel 7', 11' (pen.), 89'; Bookhard 21', 45+2'; Villaflor 59'	Report	Lee Na-ri 78'

Thuwunna Stadium, Yangon
Attendance: 153
Referee: Tian Jin (China)

28 August 2025
16:00 UTC+6:30

Khovd Western (Mongolia)	0–8	(Myanmar) ISPE
	Report	Hnin Pwint Aye 3'; May Htet Lu 7'; Shwe Yee Tun 33'; Lin Myint Mo 39', 67'; San Thaw Thaw 48' (pen.); Sandar Lin 51'; Phyu Phyu Win 65' (pen.)

Thuwunna Stadium, Yangon
Attendance: 6,316
Referee: Plong Pich Akara (Cambodia)
28 August 2025
19:00 UTC+6:30

Strykers (Guam)	0–13	(Philippines) Stallion Laguna
	Report	Bookhard 2'; C. McDaniel 18', 26' (pen.), 37', 47', 56', 64'; Chan 35', 52'; Cerdon 44', 57'; Merrill 69'; Lemoran 89'

Thuwunna Stadium, Yangon
Attendance: 38
Referee: Nurul Ain Izatty (Malaysia)

31 August 2025
16:00 UTC+6:30

Stallion Laguna (Philippines)	1–3	(Myanmar) ISPE
Davidson 13'	Report	Sandar Lin 50'; San Thaw Thaw 79'; Khin Marlar Tun 89'

Thuwunna Stadium, Yangon
Attendance: 8,611
Referee: Kim Yu-jeong (South Korea)
31 August 2025
19:00 UTC+6:30

Strykers (Guam)	2–5	(Mongolia) Khovd Western
Kawauchi 67'; Ibanez 88'	Report	Kim Hyun-jeong 5'; Sunday 20', 21'; Badamkhatan 28'; Jeong Eun-uk 51'

Thuwunna Stadium, Yangon
Attendance: 53
Referee: Tian Jin (China)

=== Group B ===
Pos	Team	Pld	W	D	L	GF	GA	GD	Pts	Qualification
1	(Uzbekistan) Nasaf (H)	3	3	0	0	6	1	+5	**9**	Advance to group stage
2	(Thailand) College of Asian Scholars	3	2	0	1	7	2	+5	**6**	
3	(Saudi Arabia) Al Nassr	3	1	0	2	6	4	+2	**3**	
4	(Nepal) APF	3	0	0	3	1	13	−12	**0**	

Source: AFC
Rules for classification: Tiebreakers
(H) Hosts
25 August 2025
17:30 UTC+5

College of Asian Scholars (Thailand)	2–0	(Saudi Arabia) Al Nassr
Kanyanat 23'; Khwanjira 86'	Report

Markaziy Stadium, Qarshi
Attendance: 100
Referee: Azusa Sugino (Japan)
25 August 2025
20:30 UTC+5

Nasaf (Uzbekistan)	3–0	(Nepal) APF
Khabibullaeva 13', 16'; Shoyimova 33'	Report

Markaziy Stadium, Qarshi
Attendance: 200
Referee: Lara Lee (Australia)

28 August 2025
17:30 UTC+5

APF (Nepal)	0–4	(Thailand) College of Asian Scholars
	Report	Kanyanat 34', 45+6', 54', 63'

Markaziy Stadium, Qarshi
Attendance: 120
Referee: Khin Nyein Chan (Myanmar)
28 August 2025
20:30 UTC+5

Al Nassr (Saudi Arabia)	0–1	(Uzbekistan) Nasaf
	Report	Karachik 71'

Markaziy Stadium, Qarshi
Attendance: 2,123
Referee: Fatemeh Nasiri Looshani (Iran)

31 August 2025
17:30 UTC+5

APF (Nepal)	1–6	(Saudi Arabia) Al Nassr
Magar 50'	Report	Luvanga 4', 63'; Duda 41', 70', 81'; Salihi 86'

Markaziy Stadium, Qarshi
Attendance: 100
Referee: Jon Sol-mi (North Korea)
31 August 2025
20:30 UTC+5

College of Asian Scholars (Thailand)	1–2	(Uzbekistan) Nasaf
Kanyanat 90+6'	Report	Khabibullaeva 25'; Karachik 47'

Markaziy Stadium, Qarshi
Attendance: 1,097
Referee: Lara Lee (Australia)

=== Group C ===
Pos	Team	Pld	W	D	L	GF	GA	GD	Pts	Qualification
1	(Singapore) Lion City Sailors	3	3	0	0	8	1	+7	**9**	Advance to group stage
2	(Jordan) Etihad	3	2	0	1	7	3	+4	**6**	
3	(Kyrgyzstan) Sdyushor SI–Asiagoal	3	0	1	2	1	6	−5	**1**	
4	(Malaysia) Kelana United (H)	3	0	1	2	1	7	−6	**1**	

Source: AFC
Rules for classification: Tiebreakers
(H) Hosts
25 August 2025
16:45 UTC+8

Etihad (Jordan)	0–2	(Singapore) Lion City Sailors
	Report	Takeuchi 11', 40'

Hang Jebat Stadium, Melaka
Attendance: 36
Referee: Mahnaz Zokaee (Iran)
25 August 2025
20:45 UTC+8

Kelana United (Malaysia)	0–0	(Kyrgyzstan) Sdyushor SI–Asiagoal
	Report

Hang Jebat Stadium, Melaka
Attendance: 36
Referee: Supiree Testhomya (Thailand)

28 August 2025
16:45 UTC+8

Sdyushor SI–Asiagoal (Kyrgyzstan)	1–3	(Jordan) Etihad
Toktobolotova 71'	Report	Ninika 47'; Tetteh 58', 65'

Hang Jebat Stadium, Melaka
Attendance: 15
Referee: Lê Thị Ly (Vietnam)
28 August 2025
20:45 UTC+8

Lion City Sailors (Singapore)	3–1	(Malaysia) Kelana United
Inayama 11'; Ain 63'; Takeuchi 68'	Report	Viny 90+1'

Hang Jebat Stadium, Melaka
Attendance: 115
Referee: Yang Shu-Ting (Chinese Taipei)

31 August 2025
16:45 UTC+8

Lion City Sailors (Singapore)	3–0	(Kyrgyzstan) Sdyushor SI–Asiagoal
Takeuchi 10'; Inayama 35'; Sarah 63'	Report

Hang Jebat Stadium, Melaka
Attendance: 48
Referee: Alesar Baddour (Syria)
31 August 2025
20:45 UTC+8

Kelana United (Malaysia)	0–4	(Jordan) Etihad
	Report	Fraij 23'; Shalika 32' (o.g.); Rai 68'; Ninika 88' (pen.)

Hang Jebat Stadium, Melaka
Attendance: 454
Referee: Supiree Testhomya (Thailand)

=== Group D ===
Pos	Team	Pld	W	D	L	GF	GA	GD	Pts	Qualification
1	(North Korea) Naegohyang	3	3	0	0	23	0	+23	**9**	Advance to group stage
2	(Chinese Taipei) Kaohsiung Attackers	3	2	0	1	7	5	+2	**6**	
3	(Bhutan) Royal Thimphu College	3	1	0	2	5	9	−4	**3**	
4	(Laos) Master (H)	3	0	0	3	0	21	−21	**0**	

Source: AFC
Rules for classification: Tiebreakers
(H) Hosts
25 August 2025
16:00 UTC+7

Kaohsiung Attackers (Chinese Taipei)	2–0	(Bhutan) Royal Thimphu College
Uetsuji 6'; Alaniz 49'	Report

New Laos National Stadium, Vientiane
Attendance: 103
Referee: Veronika Bernatskaya (Kyrgyzstan)
25 August 2025
19:30 UTC+7

Naegohyang (North Korea)	11–0	(Laos) Master
Jong Kum 1'; Kim Kyong-yong 2', 14'; Choe Kum-ok 12', 18', 42'; Kim Un-ju 52'; Min Kyong-jin 74', 90+3'; Pak Ye-gyong 75', 85'	Report

New Laos National Stadium, Vientiane
Attendance: 206
Referee: Ranjita Devi Tekcham (India)

28 August 2025
16:00 UTC+7

Royal Thimphu College (Bhutan)	0–7	(North Korea) Naegohyang
	Report	Ri Su-jong 12'; Kim Song-ok 14'; Jong Kum 24'; Pak Hyo-son 45', 86'; Ri Yu-jong 65'; Ri Kum-hyang 84'

New Laos National Stadium, Vientiane
Attendance: 60
Referee: Mu Mingxin (China)
28 August 2025
19:30 UTC+7

Master (Laos)	0–5	(Chinese Taipei) Kaohsiung Attackers
	Report	Chen Jin-wen 1'; Wu Kai-ching 7'; Tamon 66' (o.g.); Wakabayashi 77', 90+4'

New Laos National Stadium, Vientiane
Attendance: 223
Referee: Sunita Thongthawin (Thailand)

31 August 2025
16:00 UTC+7

Kaohsiung Attackers (Chinese Taipei)	0–5	(North Korea) Naegohyang
	Report	Jong Kum 1', 10', 22'; Ri Su-jong 7'; Ri Yong-gyong 77'

New Laos National Stadium, Vientiane
Attendance: 71
Referee: Veronika Bernatskaya (Kyrgyzstan)
31 August 2025
19:30 UTC+7

Master (Laos)	0–5	(Bhutan) Royal Thimphu College
	Report	Choden 5'; S. Rani 12'; Tshering 56', 65'; Lhazom 62'

New Laos National Stadium, Vientiane
Attendance: 148
Referee: Bùi Thị Thu Trang (Vietnam)

=== Group E ===
Pos	Team	Pld	W	D	L	GF	GA	GD	Pts	Qualification
1	(India) East Bengal	2	1	1	0	2	1	+1	**4**	Advance to group stage
2	(Hong Kong) Kitchee	2	0	2	0	4	4	0	**2**	
3	(Cambodia) Phnom Penh Crown (H)	2	0	1	1	3	4	−1	**1**	

Source: AFC
Rules for classification: Tiebreakers
(H) Hosts
25 August 2025
19:00 UTC+7

Phnom Penh Crown (Cambodia)	0–1	(India) East Bengal
	Report	Ikwaput 70'

National Sports Complex, Phnom Penh
Attendance: 786
Referee: Oh Hyeon-jeong (South Korea)

28 August 2025
19:00 UTC+7

Kitchee (Hong Kong)	3–3	(Cambodia) Phnom Penh Crown
Cheung Wai Ki 27'; Maggie Chu 31'; Fowler Kwong 90+3'	Report	Kuroki 33'; Serysitha 82'; Kunthea 85'

National Sports Complex, Phnom Penh
Attendance: 668
Referee: Doumouh Al Bakkar (Lebanon)

31 August 2025
19:00 UTC+7

East Bengal (India)	1–1	(Hong Kong) Kitchee
Basfore 11'	Report	Ho Mui Mei 59'

National Sports Complex, Phnom Penh
Attendance: 253
Referee: Haruna Kanematsu (Japan)

=== Best runners-up ranking ===
Since Group E only had three teams, the results against fourth-placed teams in other groups were omitted for this ranking.

Pos	Grp	Team	Pld	W	D	L	GF	GA	GD	Pts	Qualification
1	**A**	(Philippines) Stallion Laguna	2	1	0	1	7	4	+3	**3**	Advance to group stage
2	**B**	(Thailand) College of Asian Scholars	2	1	0	1	3	2	+1	**3**	
3	**C**	(Jordan) Etihad	2	1	0	1	3	3	0	**3**	
4	**D**	(Chinese Taipei) Kaohsiung Attackers	2	1	0	1	2	5	−3	**3**	
5	**E**	(Hong Kong) Kitchee	2	0	2	0	4	4	0	**2**	

Source: AFC
Rules for classification: Tiebreakers

== Group stage ==
The draw was conducted on September 11, 2025 in Kuala Lumpur, with matches to be played in three centralised venues.

=== Seedings ===
Pot 1	Pot 2	Pot 3	Pot 4
(China) Wuhan Jiangda (4) (H, TH) (Australia) Melbourne City (1) (South Korea) Suwon (2)	(Japan) NTV Tokyo Verdy Beleza (3) (Vietnam) Hồ Chí Minh City (5) (H) (Iran) Bam Khatoon (7)	(Philippines) Stallion Laguna (9) (India) East Bengal (11) (North Korea) Naegohyang (13)	(Uzbekistan) Nasaf (14) (Myanmar) ISPE (15) (H) (Singapore) Lion City Sailors (23)

(H) Hosts
(TH) Title holders

=== Group A ===
Pos	Team	Pld	W	D	L	GF	GA	GD	Pts	Qualification
1	(Australia) Melbourne City	3	3	0	0	15	0	+15	9	Advance to knockout stage
2	(Vietnam) Hồ Chí Minh City (H)	3	2	0	1	3	3	0	6	Advance to knockout stage
3	(Philippines) Stallion Laguna	3	1	0	2	5	8	−3	3	Advance to knockout stage
4	(Singapore) Lion City Sailors	3	0	0	3	0	12	−12	0	

Source: AFC
Rules for classification: Tiebreakers
(H) Hosts
13 November 2025
15:00 UTC+7

Melbourne City (Australia)	5–0	(Singapore) Lion City Sailors
McNamara 12' (pen.), 45+1' (pen.); Apostolakis 55'; Butrus 58'; Dhaniyah 73' (o.g.)	Report

Thống Nhất Stadium, Ho Chi Minh City
Attendance: 512
Referee: Oh Hyeon-jeong (South Korea)
13 November 2025
19:00 UTC+7

Hồ Chí Minh City (Vietnam)	1–0	(Philippines) Stallion Laguna
Huỳnh Như 58'	Report

Thống Nhất Stadium, Ho Chi Minh City
Attendance: 1,052
Referee: Mahnaz Zokaee (Iran)

16 November 2025
15:00 UTC+7

Stallion Laguna (Philippines)	0–7	(Australia) Melbourne City
	Report	Keane 5'; Davidson 9'; McKenna 40', 45+2'; Jackson 67', 90'; Butrus 72'

Thống Nhất Stadium, Ho Chi Minh City
Attendance: 323
Referee: Asaka Koizumi (Japan)
16 November 2025
19:00 UTC+7

Lion City Sailors (Singapore)	0–2	(Vietnam) Hồ Chí Minh City
	Report	Trần Nguyễn Bảo Châu 84'; K'Thủa 90+3'

Thống Nhất Stadium, Ho Chi Minh City
Attendance: 925
Referee: Dong Fangyu (China)

19 November 2025
15:00 UTC+7

Stallion Laguna (Philippines)	5–0	(Singapore) Lion City Sailors
Johnson 22'; C. McDaniel 44', 89'; Christensen 75', 83'	Report

Thống Nhất Stadium, Ho Chi Minh City
Attendance: 152
Referee: Veronika Bernatskaia (Kyrgyzstan)
19 November 2025
19:00 UTC+7

Melbourne City (Australia)	3–0	(Vietnam) Hồ Chí Minh City
McNamara 1'; Apostolakis 4'; McMahon 40'	Report

Thống Nhất Stadium, Ho Chi Minh City
Attendance: 726
Referee: Dong Fangyu (China)

=== Group B ===
Pos	Team	Pld	W	D	L	GF	GA	GD	Pts	Qualification
1	(China) Wuhan Jiangda (H)	3	2	1	0	7	1	+6	7	Advance to knockout stage
2	(Uzbekistan) Nasaf	3	1	1	1	4	2	+2	4	Advance to knockout stage
3	(India) East Bengal	3	1	0	2	3	6	−3	3	
4	(Iran) Bam Khatoon	3	1	0	2	2	7	−5	3	

Source: AFC
Rules for classification: Tiebreakers
(H) Hosts
17 November 2025
15:00 UTC+8

Bam Khatoon (Iran)	1–3	(India) East Bengal
Hamoudi 45+8' (pen.)	Report	Hemam 4'; Ikwaput 32'; Nanziri 87'

Hankou Cultural Sports Centre, Wuhan
Attendance: 268
Referee: Casey Reibelt (Australia)
17 November 2025
19:00 UTC+8

Wuhan Jiangda (China)	1–1	(Uzbekistan) Nasaf
Adams 20' (o.g.)	Report	Kudratova 45+1'

Hankou Cultural Sports Centre, Wuhan
Attendance: 786
Referee: Yoshimi Yamashita (Japan)

20 November 2025
15:00 UTC+8

East Bengal (India)	0–2	(China) Wuhan Jiangda
	Report	Wang Shuang 8', 17' (pen.)

Hankou Cultural Sports Centre, Wuhan
Attendance: 625
Referee: Kim Yu-jeong (South Korea)
20 November 2025
19:00 UTC+8

Nasaf (Uzbekistan)	0–1	(Iran) Bam Khatoon
	Report	Didar 14'

Hankou Cultural Sports Centre, Wuhan
Attendance: 83
Referee: Bùi Thị Thu Trang (Vietnam)

23 November 2025
15:00 UTC+8

East Bengal (India)	0–3	(Uzbekistan) Nasaf
	Report	Khabibullaeva 18', 90+8'; Norboeva 52'

Hankou Cultural Sports Centre, Wuhan
Attendance: 354
Referee: Yoshimi Yamashita (Japan)
23 November 2025
19:00 UTC+8

Wuhan Jiangda (China)	4–0	(Iran) Bam Khatoon
Owusu 45+4', 50'; Deng Mengye 55'; Zhao Jingyi 88'	Report

Hankou Cultural Sports Centre, Wuhan
Attendance: 1,285
Referee: Lara Lee (Australia)

=== Group C ===
Pos	Team	Pld	W	D	L	GF	GA	GD	Pts	Qualification
1	(Japan) Tokyo Verdy	3	2	1	0	5	0	+5	7	Advance to knockout stage
2	(North Korea) Naegohyang	3	2	0	1	6	4	+2	6	Advance to knockout stage
3	(South Korea) Suwon	3	1	1	1	5	3	+2	4	Advance to knockout stage
4	(Myanmar) ISPE (H)	3	0	0	3	0	9	−9	0	

Source: AFC
Rules for classification: Tiebreakers
(H) Hosts
9 November 2025
15:00 UTC+6:30

NTV Tokyo Verdy Beleza (Japan)	4–0	(North Korea) Naegohyang
Shiokoshi 5'; Shinjo 59'; Hiwatari 65', 76'	Report

Thuwunna Stadium, Yangon
Attendance: 732
Referee: Supiree Testhomya (Thailand)
9 November 2025
19:00 UTC+6:30

Suwon (South Korea)	5–0	(Myanmar) ISPE
Mileninha 45+5'; Nishikawa 56'; Song Ji-yoon 50', 74'; Seo Ye-jin 83'	Report

Thuwunna Stadium, Yangon
Attendance: 7,924
Referee: Tian Jin (China)

12 November 2025
15:00 UTC+6:30

ISPE (Myanmar)	0–1	(Japan) NTV Tokyo Verdy Beleza
	Report	Danelle Tan 13'

Thuwunna Stadium, Yangon
Attendance: 4,851
Referee: Doumouh Al Bakkar (Lebanon)
12 November 2025
19:00 UTC+6:30

Naegohyang (North Korea)	3–0	(South Korea) Suwon
Pak Ye-gyong 68'; Ri Su-jong 73', 90+6'	Report

Thuwunna Stadium, Yangon
Attendance: 680
Referee: Lê Thị Ly (Vietnam)

15 November 2025
15:00 UTC+6:30

Suwon (South Korea)	0–0	(Japan) NTV Tokyo Verdy Beleza
	Report

Thuwunna Stadium, Yangon
Attendance: 253
Referee: Lê Thị Ly (Vietnam)
15 November 2025
19:00 UTC+6:30

Naegohyang (North Korea)	3–0	(Myanmar) ISPE
Kim Hye-yong 13'; Ri Kum-hyang 57'; Kim Kyong-yong 69'	Report

Thuwunna Stadium, Yangon
Attendance: 6,322
Referee: Pansa Chaisanit (Thailand)

=== Ranking of second-placed teams ===
Pos	Grp	Team	Pld	W	D	L	GF	GA	GD	Pts	Qualification
1	C	(North Korea) Naegohyang	3	2	0	1	6	4	+2	6	Seeded in knockout stage draw
2	A	(Vietnam) Hồ Chí Minh City	3	2	0	1	3	3	0	6	Unseeded in knockout stage draw
3	B	(Uzbekistan) Nasaf	3	1	1	1	4	2	+2	4	Unseeded in knockout stage draw

Source: AFC
Rules for classification: 1) Points; 2) Goal difference; 3) Goals scored; 4) Discilpinary points; 5) Drawing of lots.

=== Ranking of third-placed teams ===
Pos	Grp	Team	Pld	W	D	L	GF	GA	GD	Pts	Qualification
1	C	(South Korea) Suwon	3	1	1	1	5	3	+2	4	Advance to knockout stage (unseeded)
2	A	(Philippines) Stallion Laguna	3	1	0	2	5	8	−3	3	Advance to knockout stage (unseeded)
3	B	(India) East Bengal	3	1	0	2	3	6	−3	3	

Source: AFC
Rules for classification: 1) Points; 2) Goal difference; 3) Goals scored; 4) Discilpinary points; 5) Drawing of lots.

== Knockout stage ==
The knockout stage is being played in a single-leg knockout format. The semi-finals and the final match will be played in a centralised location.

=== Draw ===
The draw was held on 15 January 2026. For the quarter-finals, teams were seeded based on their performance in the group stage. The three group winners and the best second-placed team were seeded, hosting the match. Teams from the same group could not be drawn against each other.

Seeded	Unseeded
(Australia) Melbourne City; (China) Wuhan Jiangda; (Japan) NTV Tokyo Verdy Beleza; (North Korea) Naegohyang	(Vietnam) Hồ Chí Minh City; (Uzbekistan) Nasaf; (South Korea) Suwon; (Philippines) Stallion Laguna

=== Bracket ===
Quarter-finals
29 March – Melbourne
(Football Australia) Melbourne City	2
(Uzbekistan Football Association) Nasaf	1
28 March – Tokyo
(Japan Football Association) Tokyo Verdy Beleza	5
(Philippine Football Federation) Stallion Laguna	0
28 March – Vientiane
(DPR Korea Football Association) Naegohyang	3
(Vietnam Football Federation) Hồ Chí Minh City	0
29 March – Wuhan
(Chinese Football Association) Wuhan Jiangda	0
(Korea Football Association) Suwon	4

Semi-finals
20 May – Suwon
(Football Australia) Melbourne City	1
(Japan Football Association) Tokyo Verdy Beleza	3
20 May – Suwon
(DPR Korea Football Association) Naegohyang	2
(Korea Football Association) Suwon	1

Final
23 May – Suwon
(Japan Football Association) Tokyo Verdy Beleza	0
(DPR Korea Football Association) Naegohyang	1

=== Quarter-finals ===
28 March 2026
14:00 UTC+9

NTV Tokyo Verdy Beleza (Japan)	5–0	(Philippines) Stallion Laguna
Hiwatari 41'; Kitamura 48'; Naomoto 71' (pen.); Matsunaga 82'; Ujihara 85'	Report

Tokyo Stadium, Tokyo
Attendance: 5,530
Referee: Kim Yu-jeong (South Korea)

28 March 2026
15:00 UTC+7

Naegohyang (North Korea)	3–0	(Vietnam) Hồ Chí Minh City
Kim Hye-yong 40'; Jong Kum 66'; Kim Kyong-yong 85' (pen.)	Report

New Laos National Stadium, Vientiane (Laos)
Attendance: 105
Referee: Veronika Bernatskaia (Kyrgyzstan)

29 March 2026
15:00 UTC+11

Melbourne City (Australia)	2–1	(Uzbekistan) Nasaf
McNamara 38'; Uchendu 89'	Report	Mamatkarimova 42'

The Home of the Matildas, Melbourne
Attendance: 572
Referee: Yoshimi Yamashita (Japan)

29 March 2026
19:00 UTC+8

Wuhan Jiangda (China)	0–4	(South Korea) Suwon
	Report	Ji So-yun 11'; Suzuki 35'; Kim Hye-ri 48'; Jeon Min-ji 90+3'

Hankou Cultural Sports Centre, Wuhan
Attendance: 5,869
Referee: Lê Thị Ly (Vietnam)

=== Semi-finals ===
20 May 2026
14:00 UTC+9

Melbourne City (Australia)	1–3	(Japan) NTV Tokyo Verdy Beleza
Keane 37'	Report	Shiokoshi 4', 78'; Shinjo 10'

Suwon Sports Complex, Suwon
Attendance: 1,362
Referee: Tian Jin (China)

20 May 2026
19:00 UTC+9

Naegohyang (North Korea)	2–1	(South Korea) Suwon
Choe Kum-ok 55'; Kim Kyong-yong 67'	Report	Suzuki 49'

Suwon Sports Complex, Suwon
Attendance: 5,763
Referee: Lê Thị Ly (Vietnam)

=== Final ===
23 May 2026
14:00 UTC+9

NTV Tokyo Verdy Beleza (Japan)	0–1	(North Korea) Naegohyang
	Report	Kim Kyong-yong 44'

Suwon Sports Complex, Suwon
Attendance: 2,670
Referee: Supiree Testhomya (Thailand)

== Top scorers ==
Team eliminated for this round / inactive for this round / Matches voided by AFC / Player left the team

Rank	Player	Team	MD1	MD2	MD3	QF	SF	F	Total
1	(Australia) Holly McNamara	(Football Australia) Melbourne City	2		1	1			4
1	(North Korea) Kim Kyong-yong	(DPR Korea Football Association) Naegohyang			1	1	1	1	4
2	(Japan) Moka Hiwatari	(Japan Football Association) NTV Tokyo Verdy Beleza	2			1			3
2	(Japan) Yuzuho Shiokoshi	(Japan Football Association) NTV Tokyo Verdy Beleza	1				2		3
5	(Japan) Miharu Shinjo	(Japan Football Association) NTV Tokyo Verdy Beleza	1				1		2
5	(Australia) Alexia Apostolakis	(Football Australia) Melbourne City	1		1				2
5	(Australia) Danella Butrus	(Football Australia) Melbourne City	1	1					2
5	(Australia) Leticia McKenna	(Football Australia) Melbourne City		2					2
5	(New Zealand) Deven Jackson	(Football Australia) Melbourne City		2					2
5	(Australia) Aideen Keane	(Football Australia) Melbourne City		1			1		2
5	(North Korea) Kim Hye-yong	(DPR Korea Football Association) Naegohyang			1	1			2
5	(North Korea) Ri Su-jong	(DPR Korea Football Association) Naegohyang		2			1		2
5	(Japan) Haruhi Suzuki	(Korea Football Association) Suwon				1	1		2
5	(South Korea) Song Ji-yoon	(Korea Football Association) Suwon	2						2
5	(Philippines) Chandler McDaniel	(Philippine Football Federation) Stallion Laguna			2				2
5	(New Zealand) Tayla Christensen	(Philippine Football Federation) Stallion Laguna			2				2
5	(China) Wang Shuang	(Chinese Football Association) Wuhan Jiangda		2					2
5	(Ghana) Mavis Owusu	(Chinese Football Association) Wuhan Jiangda			2				2
5	(Uzbekistan) Diyorakhon Khabibullaeva	(Uzbekistan Football Association) Nasaf			2				2

Note

- Goals scored in the preliminary stage and matches voided by AFC are not counted when determining top scorer.

== See also ==
- 2025–26 AFC Champions League Elite
- 2025–26 AFC Champions League Two
- 2025–26 AFC Challenge League
