= 2027 FIFA Women's Champions Cup =

2nd edition of the FIFA Women's Champions Cup

Tournament details
- Host country: Final phase: United States
- Dates: October 25, 2026 – January 31, 2027
- Teams: 6 (from 6 confederations)
- Venues: 3 (in 3 host cities)

Tournament statistics
- Matches played: 1
- Goals scored: 2 (2 per match)
- Attendance: 3,987 (3,987 per match)
- Top scorer(s): (North Korea) Kim Kyong-yong (Naegohyang); 2 goals

The 2027 FIFA Women's Champions Cup is the second edition of the FIFA Women's Champions Cup, an annual club soccer tournament organized by FIFA. The tournament features the champion clubs from each of the six continental confederations, playing each other in a single-elimination bracket, to determine the world's premier women's club.

The first two matches will be played in the home stadium of a team involved in each match, and the final four matches will be played in Miami, United States. However, no club from the United States will participate as, after the host announcement, Mexican club América won the W Champions Cup by beating two NWSL clubs in the finals.

Arsenal is the defending champion, but they will not be able to defend their title after being eliminated by Lyon in the semi-finals of the 2025–26 UEFA Women's Champions League.

== Format ==
The six FIFA continental confederations have one representative each. They are the teams crowned continental club champions in 2026. Seeding was based on results from the previous edition, except for the host conferation's team who gets top seed.

- Round 1: The champion of the AFC Women's Champions League hosts the champion of the OFC Women's Champions League.
- Round 2: The champion of the CAF Women's Champions League hosts the winner from Round 1.
- Semi-finals: The Round 2 winner plays the champion of the CONCACAF W Champions Cup, while the champion of the UEFA Women's Champions League plays the champion of the Copa Libertadores Femenina. Both matches are at a neutral venue.
- Final and third-place match: The semi-final winners contest the final, and the losers play in the third-place match. Both matches are at a neutral venue.

== Qualified teams ==
Location of the teams participating in the 2027 FIFA Women's Champions Cup.

Team	Confederation	Qualification	Qualified date	Participation
Entering in the semi-finals
(Mexico) América	CONCACAF	Winner of the 2025–26 CONCACAF W Champions Cup	May 23, 2026	1st
(Brazil) Cruzeiro	CONMEBOL	Winner of the 2026 Copa Libertadores Femenina	October 31, 2026	1st
(Spain) Barcelona	UEFA	Winner of the 2025–26 UEFA Women's Champions League	May 23, 2026	1st
Entering in the second round
(Morocco) AS FAR	CAF	Winner of the 2026 CAF Women's Champions League	November 15, 2026	2nd
Entering in the first round
(North Korea) Naegohyang	AFC	Winner of the 2025–26 AFC Women's Champions League	May 23, 2026	1st
(New Zealand) Auckland United	OFC	Winner of the 2026 OFC Women's Champions League	July 10, 2026	2nd

== Venues ==
Miami was announced as the host of the final four matches during the FIFA Congress on April 28, 2026, and Nu Stadium announced as the venue on September 21, 2026. Although Round 1 should be hosted by the AFC team (in North Korea), the match was instead played at a neutral venue in China.

China	Morocco	United States
Hangzhou	Rabat	Miami
Shangcheng Sports Centre Stadium	Rabat Olympic Stadium	Nu Stadium
Capacity: 13,544	Capacity: 21,000	Capacity: 26,700
2027 FIFA Women's Champions Cup is located in China	2027 FIFA Women's Champions Cup is located in Morocco	2027 FIFA Women's Champions Cup is located in the United States

== Matches ==
For each match, if the scores are level when normal playing time expires, 30 minutes of extra time will be played. If still tied at the end of extra time, a penalty shootout will be used to determine the winner.

Round 1
October 25 – Hangzhou
(North Korea) Naegohyang	2
(New Zealand) Auckland United	0

Round 2
December 12 - Rabat
(Morocco) AS FAR
(North Korea) Naegohyang

Semi-finals
January 26 – Miami
(Mexico) América
Winner R2
January 27 – Miami
(Spain) Barcelona
(Brazil) Cruzeiro

Final
January 31 – Miami
Winner SF1
Winner SF2
Match for third place
January 31 – Miami
Loser SF1
Loser SF2

=== Round 1 ===
October 25, 2026
15:00 UTC+8

Naegohyang (North Korea)	2–0	(New Zealand) Auckland United
Kim Kyong-yong 17', 88'	Report

Shangcheng Sports Centre Stadium, Hangzhou (China)
Attendance: 3,987
Referee: Silvia Gasperotti (Italy)

=== Round 2 ===
December 12, 2026
19:00 UTC+0

AS FAR (Morocco)	R2	(North Korea) Naegohyang
	Report

Rabat Olympic Stadium, Rabat

=== Semi-finals ===
January 26, 2027
19:30 UTC−5

América (Mexico)	SF1	Winner R2
	Report

Nu Stadium, Miami

January 27, 2027
19:30 UTC−5

Barcelona (Spain)	SF2	(Brazil) Cruzeiro
	Report

Nu Stadium, Miami

=== Match for third place ===
January 31, 2027
15:30 UTC−5

Loser SF1	v	Loser SF2
	Report

Nu Stadium, Miami

=== Final ===
January 31, 2027
18:30 UTC−5

Winner SF1	v	Winner SF2
	Report

Nu Stadium, Miami

== Goalscorers ==
As of 25 October 2026

Rank	Player	Team	Goals
1	(North Korea) Kim Kyong-yong	(North Korea) Naegohyang	2

== Marketing ==
Streaming coverage of round 1 was provided for free worldwide on FIFA+ (which was moved to DAZN in June 2026). Tickets for the matches in Miami went on sale October 22, 2026 exclusively to Visa cardholders, before general sale commenced on October 30, 2026.

== See also ==
- 2026 FIFA Intercontinental Cup
