= Kim Kyong-yong =

North Korean footballer (born 2002)

Personal information
- Date of birth: 2 January 2002 (age 24)
- Place of birth: Pyongyang, North Korea
- Height: 1.63 m (5 ft 4 in)
- Position: Forward

Team information
- Current team: Naegohyang FC
- Number: 17

Youth career
- 2014–2017: Naegohyang FC

Senior career*
Years	Team	Apps	(Gls)
2017–	Naegohyang FC		

International career^{‡}
2017–2018	North Korea U-17	9	(11)
2018–2022	North Korea U-20	14	(10)
2023–	North Korea	27	(33)
- * Club domestic league appearances and goals ‡ National team caps and goals as of 25 September 2026

- Kim Kyong-yong
- Hangul: 김경영
- Hanja: 金景英
- RR: Gim Gyeongyeong
- MR: Kim Kyŏngyŏng
- IPA: [kim ɡjʌŋ.jʌŋ]

Kim Kyong-yong (Korean: 김경영; born 2 January 2002) is a North Korean footballer who plays as a forward for DPR Korea Women's Premier League (DPRK WPL) club Naegohyang FC and the North Korea national team. She was part of Korea DPR's World Cup squad for the 2018 FIFA U-20 Women's World Cup and 2018 FIFA U-17 Women's World Cup.

== Club career ==
She started playing football at the age of 9 joined the Naegohyang Sport Club in 2014. In the 2021–22 season, she contributed to Naegohyang's first ever DPR Korea Women's Premier League title, being the top scorer with 22 goals scored.

In the 2025–26 season, she scored 4 goals in the 2025–26 AFC Women's Champions League including the winning goal in the final against Tokyo Verdy Beleza to help Naegohyang become the first North Korean club to win a continental title.

== International career ==
Kim was a member of the under-16 and under-19 teams that finished as runners-up in the 2017 AFC U-16 Women's Championship and 2019 AFC U-19 Women's Championship respectively.

She already made history in the U-16 Championship back in 2017 when she scored in every match but one, racking up the highest individual scoring tally at the tournament since Australia's Caitlin Foord.

She made her national senior debut for Korea DPR on 24 September against Singapore as a part of the 2022 Asian Games. Kyong-yong was the key player for Korea DPR in their road to the 2022 Asian Games Gold match final, as she scored 11 goals in four games, netting a five goal thriller against Singapore on their second-leg and a super hat-trick against Uzbekistan in the semi-finals.

In February 2026, Kim was named in the North Korea squad for the 2026 AFC Women's Asian Cup.

== Career statistics ==
=== Club ===
==== Naegohyang ====
Scores and results list Naegohyang's goal tally first, score column indicates score after each Kim goal.

No.	Date	Venue	Opponent	Score	Result	Competition
1.	25 August 2025	New Laos National Stadium, Vientiane, Laos	(Laos) Master	2–0	11–0	2025–26 AFC Women's Champions League preliminary round
2.	25 August 2025	New Laos National Stadium, Vientiane, Laos	(Laos) Master	4–0	11–0	2025–26 AFC Women's Champions League preliminary round
3.	15 November 2025	Thuwunna Stadium, Yangon, Myanmar	(Myanmar) ISPE	3–0	3–0	2025–26 AFC Women's Champions League
4.	28 March 2026	New Laos National Stadium, Vientiane, Laos	(Vietnam) Hồ Chí Minh City	3–0	3–0	2025–26 AFC Women's Champions League
5.	20 May 2026	Suwon Sports Complex, Suwon, South Korea	(South Korea) Suwon	2–1	2–1	2025–26 AFC Women's Champions League
6.	23 May 2026	Suwon Sports Complex, Suwon, South Korea	(Japan) NTV Tokyo Verdy Beleza	1–0	1–0	2025–26 AFC Women's Champions League
7.	25 October 2026	Shangcheng Sports Centre Stadium, Hangzhou China	(New Zealand) Auckland United	1–0	2–0	2027 FIFA Women's Champions Cup
8.	25 October 2026	Shangcheng Sports Centre Stadium, Hangzhou China	(New Zealand) Auckland United	2–0	2–0	2027 FIFA Women's Champions Cup
9.	1 November 2026	Thuwunna Stadium, Yangon, Myanmar	(Myanmar) Ayeyawady	4–0	7–0	2026–27 AFC Women's Champions League

=== International ===
Appearances and goals by national team and year
National team	Year	Apps	Goals
North Korea
North Korea	2023	13	17
North Korea	2024	2	0
North Korea	2025	5	9
North Korea	2026	9	7
Total		27	33

==== North Korea U17 ====
Scores and results list North Korea U17's goal tally first, score column indicates score after each Kim goal.

No.	Date	Venue	Opponent	Score	Result	Competition
1.	11 September 2017	Chonburi Stadium, Chonburi, Thailand	Bangladesh	1–0	9–0	2017 AFC U-16 Women's Championship
2.	11 September 2017	Chonburi Stadium, Chonburi, Thailand	Bangladesh	2–0	9–0	2017 AFC U-16 Women's Championship
3.	11 September 2017	Chonburi Stadium, Chonburi, Thailand	Bangladesh	5–0	9–0	2017 AFC U-16 Women's Championship
4.	11 September 2017	Chonburi Stadium, Chonburi, Thailand	Bangladesh	7–0	9–0	2017 AFC U-16 Women's Championship
5.	11 September 2017	Chonburi Stadium, Chonburi, Thailand	Bangladesh	8–0	9–0	2017 AFC U-16 Women's Championship
6.	14 September 2017	Chonburi Stadium, Chonburi, Thailand	Australia	1–0	7–0	2017 AFC U-16 Women's Championship
7.	14 September 2017	Chonburi Stadium, Chonburi, Thailand	Australia	3–0	7–0	2017 AFC U-16 Women's Championship
8.	17 September 2017	Chonburi Stadium, Chonburi, Thailand	Japan	1–0	1–2	2017 AFC U-16 Women's Championship
9.	23 September 2017	Chonburi Stadium, Chonburi, Thailand	South Korea	2–0	2–0	2017 AFC U-16 Women's Championship
10.	17 November 2018	Estadio Profesor Alberto Suppici, Colonia del Sacramento, Uruguay	United States	3–0	3–0	2018 FIFA U-17 Women's World Cup
11.	24 November 2018	Estadio Profesor Alberto Suppici, Colonia del Sacramento, Uruguay	Spain	1–1	1–1 (1–3 (p)	2018 FIFA U-17 Women's World Cup

==== North Korea U20 ====
Scores and results list North Korea U20's goal tally first, score column indicates score after each Kim goal.

No.	Date	Venue	Opponent	Score	Result	Competition
1.	8 August 2018	Stade du Clos Gastel, Dinan-Léhon, France	Mexico	2–1	2–1	2018 FIFA U-20 Women's World Cup
2.	10 May 2019	Stade d'Honneur, Mallemort, France	Mexico	1–0	1–0	2019 Sud Ladies Cup
3.	15 May 2019	Stade d'Honneur, Mallemort, France	Gabon	1–0	10–0	2019 Sud Ladies Cup
4.	15 May 2019	Stade d'Honneur, Mallemort, France	Gabon	2–0	10–0	2019 Sud Ladies Cup
5.	15 May 2019	Stade d'Honneur, Mallemort, France	Gabon	6–0	10–0	2019 Sud Ladies Cup
6.	15 May 2019	Stade d'Honneur, Mallemort, France	Gabon	7–0	10–0	2019 Sud Ladies Cup
7.	30 October 2019	IPE Chonburi Stadium, Chonburi, Thailand	Vietnam	2–0	3–0	2019 AFC U-19 Women's Championship
8.	2 November 2019	Chonburi Stadium, Chonburi, Thailand	Thailand	1–0	3–1	2019 AFC U-19 Women's Championship
9.	6 November 2019	Chonburi Stadium, Chonburi, Thailand	South Korea	1–0	3–1	2019 AFC U-19 Women's Championship
10.	6 November 2019	Chonburi Stadium, Chonburi, Thailand	South Korea	2–0	3–1	2019 AFC U-19 Women's Championship

==== North Korea ====
Scores and results list North Korea's goal tally first, score column indicates score after each Kim goal.

List of international goals scored by Kim Kyong-yong
No.	Date	Venue	Opponent	Score	Result	Competition
1	24 September 2023	Wenzhou Sports Centre, Wenzhou, China	Singapore	6–0	7–0	2022 Asian Games
2	27 September 2023	Wenzhou Sports Centre, Wenzhou, China	Singapore	1–0	10–0	2022 Asian Games
3	27 September 2023	Wenzhou Sports Centre, Wenzhou, China	Singapore	4–0	10–0	2022 Asian Games
4	27 September 2023	Wenzhou Sports Centre, Wenzhou, China	Singapore	5–0	10–0	2022 Asian Games
5	27 September 2023	Wenzhou Sports Centre, Wenzhou, China	Singapore	7–0	10–0	2022 Asian Games
6	27 September 2023	Wenzhou Sports Centre, Wenzhou, China	Singapore	10–0	10–0	2022 Asian Games
7	30 September 2023	Wenzhou Sports Centre, Wenzhou, China	South Korea	4–1	4–1	2022 Asian Games
8	3 October 2023	Shangcheng Sports Centre Stadium, Hangzhou, China	Uzbekistan	2–0	8–0	2022 Asian Games
9	3 October 2023	Shangcheng Sports Centre Stadium, Hangzhou, China	Uzbekistan	4–0	8–0	2022 Asian Games
10	3 October 2023	Shangcheng Sports Centre Stadium, Hangzhou, China	Uzbekistan	6–0	8–0	2022 Asian Games
11	3 October 2023	Shangcheng Sports Centre Stadium, Hangzhou, China	Uzbekistan	7–0	8–0	2022 Asian Games
12	6 October 2023	Huanglong Sports Centre Stadium, Hangzhou, China	Japan	1–1	1–4	2022 Asian Games
13	1 November 2023	Xiamen Egret Stadium, Xiamen, China	Thailand	1–0	7–0	2024 AFC Women's Olympic Qualifying Tournament
14	1 November 2023	Xiamen Egret Stadium, Xiamen, China	Thailand	3–0	7–0	2024 AFC Women's Olympic Qualifying Tournament
15	1 November 2023	Xiamen Egret Stadium, Xiamen, China	Thailand	5–0	7–0	2024 AFC Women's Olympic Qualifying Tournament
16	30 November 2023	Suoka Sports Training Base Pitch 2, Zhuhai, China	Hong Kong	5–0	11–0	2025 EAFF E-1 Football Championship
17	4 December 2023	Suoka Sports Training Base Pitch 2, Zhuhai, China	Northern Mariana Islands	17–0	17–0	2025 EAFF E-1 Football Championship
18	29 June 2025	Pamir Stadium, Dushanbe, Tajikistan	Tajikistan	1–0	10–0	2026 AFC Women's Asian Cup qualification
19	29 June 2025	Pamir Stadium, Dushanbe, Tajikistan	Tajikistan	6–0	10–0	2026 AFC Women's Asian Cup qualification
20	29 June 2025	Pamir Stadium, Dushanbe, Tajikistan	Tajikistan	7–0	10–0	2026 AFC Women's Asian Cup qualification
21	29 June 2025	Pamir Stadium, Dushanbe, Tajikistan	Tajikistan	8–0	10–0	2026 AFC Women's Asian Cup qualification
22	2 July 2025	Pamir Stadium, Dushanbe, Tajikistan	Palestine	1–0	10–0	2026 AFC Women's Asian Cup qualification
23	2 July 2025	Pamir Stadium, Dushanbe, Tajikistan	Palestine	5–0	10–0	2026 AFC Women's Asian Cup qualification
24	5 July 2025	Pamir Stadium, Dushanbe, Tajikistan	Malaysia	3–0	6–0	2026 AFC Women's Asian Cup qualification
25	5 July 2025	Pamir Stadium, Dushanbe, Tajikistan	Malaysia	4–0	6–0	2026 AFC Women's Asian Cup qualification
26	5 July 2025	Pamir Stadium, Dushanbe, Tajikistan	Malaysia	5–0	6–0	2026 AFC Women's Asian Cup qualification
27	6 March 2026	Western Sydney Stadium, Sydney, Australia	Bangladesh	2–0	5–0	2026 AFC Women's Asian Cup
28	6 March 2026	Western Sydney Stadium, Sydney, Australia	Bangladesh	4–0	5–0	2026 AFC Women's Asian Cup
29	9 March 2026	Western Sydney Stadium, Sydney, Australia	China	1–0	1–2	2026 AFC Women's Asian Cup
30	19 March 2026	Gold Coast Stadium, Gold Coast, Australia	Chinese Taipei	3–0	4–0	2026 AFC Women's Asian Cup
31	14 September 2026	Nagai Stadium, Osaka, Japan	Bangladesh	6–0	10–0	2026 Asian Games
32	14 September 2026	Nagai Stadium, Osaka, Japan	Bangladesh	7–0	10–0	2026 Asian Games
33	25 September 2026	Shizuoka Stadium, Fukuroi, Japan	Chinese Taipei	3–0	5–1	2026 Asian Games

== Honours ==
Naegohyang

- DPR Korea Women's Premier League: 2021–22, 2023–24
- AFC Women's Champions League: 2025–26

North Korea

- Asian Games:

Runners-up: 2022

- AFC U-20 Women's Asian Cup:

Runners-up: 2019

- AFC U-17 Women's Asian Cup:

Champions: 2017

- Sud Ladies Cup:

Champions: 2019

Individual

- AFC U-17 Women's Asian Cup Most Valuable Player: 2017
- AFC U-17 Women's Asian Cup Top Scorer: 2017
- DPR Korea Women's Premier League top scorer: 2021–22
- AFC Women's Champions League MVP: 2025–26
