= Uzbekistan Women's League =

- Founded: 1995
- Country: Uzbekistan
- Confederation: AFC
- Number of clubs: 10
- Level on pyramid: 1
- Domestic cup: Uzbekistan Women's Cup
- International cup: AFC Women's Champions League
- Current champions: Nasaf (2025)
- Most championships: Nasaf (16th titles)
- Top scorer: Lyudmila Karachik (332 goals)
- Website: UFF

The Uzbekistan Women's League, also the Uzbek women's national football championship, is top division of women's football in Uzbekistan. The league is organized by the Uzbekistan Football Federation.

== Teams ==
The 2022 season was played by the following 10 teams:

- Metallurg Bekobod
- Neftchi Farg'ona
- Sogdiyona Jizzak
- Navbahor Namangan
- FK OKMK Olmaliq (Olmaliq Kon-metallurgiya Kombinati)
- PFC Sevinch Qarshi (FC Nasaf)
- Bunyodkor Toshkent
- Lokomotiv Toshkent
- Paxtakor Toshkent
- Qizilqum Zarafshon

== Format ==
The league features 10 teams that play a double round-robin to decide the champion. The season is held on several matchweeks, within one matchweek which lasts five days each team plays one game per day in the matchweek's city.

== Champions ==
The champions so far are:

- 1995: Chehra Toshkent
- 1996: Baho Toshkent
- 1997: Andijanka Andijon
- 1998: Dilnoza Toshkent
- 1999: Andijanka Andijon
- 2000: Andijanka Andijon
- 2001: Gulbahor Namangan
- 2002: Andijanka Andijon
- 2003: Andijanka Andijon
- 2004: Sevinch Qarshi (Севинч)
- 2005: Andijanka Andijon
- 2006: Sevinch Qarshi
- 2007: Sevinch Qarshi
- 2008: Sevinch Qarshi
- 2009: Sevinch Qarshi
- 2010: Sevinch Qarshi
- 2011: Sevinch Qarshi
- 2012: Sevinch Qarshi
- 2013: Sevinch Qarshi
- 2014: Sevinch Qarshi
- 2015: Sevinch Qarshi
- 2016: Sevinch Qarshi
- 2017: Metallurg Bekobod
- 2018: Bunyodkor Tashkent
- 2019: Sevinch Qarshi
- 2020: Bunyodkor Tashkent
- 2021: Sogdiyona Jizzak
- 2022: Sevinch Qarshi
- 2023: Sevinch (Nasaf)
- 2024: Sevinch (Nasaf)
- 2025: Sevinch (Nasaf)

== Top goalscorers ==
Season	Player	Team	Goals
2008	(Uzbekistan) Nargiza Abdurasulova	Andijanka	28
2013	(Uzbekistan) Zebo Juraeva	Sevinch	37
2014	(Uzbekistan) Zebo Juraeva	Sevinch	27
2015	(Uzbekistan) Lyudmila Karachik	Metallurg	66
2016	(Uzbekistan) Lyudmila Karachik	Metallurg	27
2017	(Uzbekistan) Lyudmila Karachik	Metallurg	40
2019	(Uzbekistan) Diyorakhon Khabibullaeva	Sogdiana	45
2020	(Uzbekistan) Dildora Ergasheva	Lokomotiv	29
2021	(Uzbekistan) Diyorakhon Khabibullaeva	Sogdiana	32
2022	(Uzbekistan) Diyorakhon Khabibullaeva	Sogdiana	37
2023	(Uzbekistan) Diyorakhon Khabibullaeva	Sogdiana	60
2024	(Uzbekistan) Lyudmila Karachik	Sevinch	48

Most time goalscorers

- 4 times
  - Diyorakhon Khabibullaeva (2019, 2021, 2022 and 2023)

Most goals by a player in a single season

- 66 goals
  - Lyudmila Karachik (2015)

Most goals by a player in a single game

- 11 goals
  - Diyorakhon Khabibullaeva (Sogdiana) 0–15 against Metallurg, 6 September 2023.

== See also ==
- AFC Women's Club Championship
