= Naegohyang Women's FC =

Naegohyang
- Full name: Naegohyang Women's Football Club
- Founded: 2012; 14 years ago
- Head coach: Ri Yu-il
- League: DPR Korea Women's Premier League
Home colours	Away colours

Naegohyang Women's Football Club (Korean: 내고향 녀자축구단) is a North Korean professional women's football club from Pyongyang. The club was founded in 2012 and competes in the DPR Korea Women's Premier League, the top division of women's football in North Korea.

== History ==
Naegohyang was founded in 2012 and won its first championship in the 2021–22 season. The team won its second title in the 2023–24 season, which qualified them for the inaugural 2024–25 AFC Women's Champions League as direct entrants to the group stage; however, they withdrew before the draw. Their first international appearance resulted in an 11–0 victory over Laos's Master FC. They are currently coached by Ri Yu-il, who has also coached the North Korea women's national team.

Naegohyang participated in the 2025–26 AFC Women's Champions League. One of their fixtures was the semi-final match against Suwon FC Women, the first South Korea-hosted sport event that North Korean athletes participated after over seven years. On 23 May 2026, Naegohyang faced Tokyo Verdy Beleza for the final and won 1–0, qualifying to the 2027 FIFA Women's Champions Cup as the Asian representative. In total, Naegohyang scored 36 goals throughout the tournament.

== Players ==
=== Current squad ===
As of 25 August 2025

Note: Flags indicate national team as defined under FIFA eligibility rules; some limited exceptions apply. Players may hold more than one non-FIFA nationality.

No.	Pos.	Nation	Player
1	GK	PRK	Kim Kyong-rim
2	DF	PRK	Yu Il-hyang
3	DF	PRK	Ri Kum-hyang
4	DF	PRK	Ri Myong-gum
5	DF	PRK	Ri Sin-ok
6	FW	PRK	Song Sun
7	MF	PRK	Pak Hyon-jong
8	MF	PRK	Kim Song-ok
9	MF	PRK	Pak Son-a
14	MF	PRK	Choe Kum-ok
15	DF	PRK	Ri Hyon-gyong
16	FW	PRK	Ri Yu-jong

No.	Pos.	Nation	Player
17	FW	PRK	Kim Kyong-yong
19	MF	PRK	Ri Su-jong
22	DF	PRK	Pak Hyo-son
25	MF	PRK	Min Kyong-jin
30	GK	PRK	Ri Rim-ye
31	FW	PRK	Jong Kum
32	MF	PRK	Ri Yong-gyong
33	FW	PRK	Kim Un-ju
34	FW	PRK	Pak Ye-gyong
39	DF	PRK	Ri Kuk-hyang
—	MF	PRK	Kim Hye-yong
—	FW	PRK	Jo Kuk-hwa
—	GK	PRK	Pak Ju-mi

== Coaching history ==
- (North Korea) Song Sung-gwon (2024)
- (North Korea) Ri Yu-il (2025–present)

== Continental record ==
Season	Competition	Round	Opponent	Score	Result
2025–26	AFC Women's Champions League	Group D	(Laos) Master	11–0	1st out of 4
2025–26	AFC Women's Champions League	Group D	(Bhutan) RTC	7–0	1st out of 4
2025–26	AFC Women's Champions League	Group D	(Chinese Taipei) Kaohsiung Attackers	5–0	1st out of 4
2025–26	AFC Women's Champions League	Group C	(Japan) Tokyo Verdy Beleza	0–4	2nd out of 4
2025–26	AFC Women's Champions League	Group C	(South Korea) Suwon	3–0	2nd out of 4
2025–26	AFC Women's Champions League	Group C	(Myanmar) ISPE	3–0	2nd out of 4
2025–26	AFC Women's Champions League	Quarter-finals	(Vietnam) Hồ Chí Minh City	3–0	
2025–26	AFC Women's Champions League	Semi-finals	(South Korea) Suwon	2–1	
2025–26	AFC Women's Champions League	Final	(Japan) Tokyo Verdy Beleza	1–0	
2026–27	FIFA Women's Champions Cup	Round 1	(New Zealand) Auckland United	2–0	
2026–27	FIFA Women's Champions Cup	Round 2	(Morocco) AS FAR		
2026–27	AFC Women's Champions League	Group A	(Myanmar) Ayeyawady	7–0	1st out of 4
2026–27	AFC Women's Champions League	Group A	(Iran) Bam Khatoon	6–1	1st out of 4
2026–27	AFC Women's Champions League	Group A	(Japan) Kobe Leonessa	1–0	1st out of 4
2026–27	AFC Women's Champions League	Quarter-finals			

== Honours ==
Domestic

- DPR Korea Premier League (2): 2021–22, 2023–24

International

- AFC Champions League (1): 2025–26
