= FC Nasaf (women) =

Nasaf Women
- Full name: Football Club Nasaf Qarshi Women
- Founded: 2003; 23 years ago
- Ground: Geolog Stadium
- Capacity: 21,000
- Chairman: Odil Temirov
- Manager: Vladislav Khan
- League: Uzbekistan Women's League
- Website: www.fcnasaf.uz
Home colours	Away colours

Football Club Nasaf Qarshi Women (Uzbek: Nasaf Futbol Klubi), is a professional women's football team based in Qarshi (Qashqadaryo Region), Uzbekistan. The team belongs to the Football Club Nasaf Qarshi. They compete in the Uzbekistan Women's League.

They won the 2023 Uzbekistan Women's football league title, which qualified them for playing in the AFC Women's Club Championship 2023 in November 2023.

== Honours ==
- Uzbekistan Women's League: (18)
  - 2004, 2005, 2006, 2007, 2008, 2009, 2010, 2011, 2012, 2013, 2014, 2015, 2016, 2019, 2022, 2023, 2024, 2025

== Stadium ==
F.C Nasaf women's team plays its home matches at the Markaziy Stadium, which was built in 2006.

== International record ==
Season	Competition	Round	Opponent	Score	Result
2023	AFC Women's Club Championship	Group B	(South Korea) Incheon Red Angels	0–3	3rd
2023	AFC Women's Club Championship	Group B	(Australia) Sydney FC	1–2	3rd
2023	AFC Women's Club Championship	Group B	(Iran) Bam Khatoon	2–2	3rd
2024–25	AFC Women's Champions League	Preliminary stage	(Nepal) APF	1–0	2nd
2024–25	AFC Women's Champions League	Preliminary stage	(Malaysia) Sabah	1–2	2nd
2025–26	AFC Women's Champions League	Preliminary stage	(Nepal) APF	3–0	1st
2025–26	AFC Women's Champions League	Preliminary stage	(Saudi Arabia) Al-Nassr	1–0	1st
2025–26	AFC Women's Champions League	Preliminary stage	(Thailand) College of Asian Scholars	2–1	1st
2025–26	AFC Women's Champions League	Group B	(China) Wuhan Jiangda	1–1	2nd
2025–26	AFC Women's Champions League	Group B	(Iran) Bam Khatoon	0–1	2nd
2025–26	AFC Women's Champions League	Group B	(India) East Bengal	3–0	2nd
2025–26	AFC Women's Champions League	Quarter-finals	(Australia) Melbourne City	1–2	
2026–27	AFC Women's Champions League	Preliminary stage	(Laos) Master	11–0	1st
2026–27	AFC Women's Champions League	Preliminary stage	(Bhutan) Royal Thimphu College	3–0	1st
2026–27	AFC Women's Champions League	Preliminary stage	(United Arab Emirates) Banaat	7–0	1st
2026–27	AFC Women's Champions League	Group C	(Australia) Melbourne City	2–0	1st
2026–27	AFC Women's Champions League	Group C	(China) Beijing Jingtan	1–2	1st
2026–27	AFC Women's Champions League	Group C	(Philippines) Kaya–Iloilo	4–0	1st

== Notable player(s) ==
- (India) Grace Dangmei (2022–2023)
