= Ri Kum-hyang =

North Korean footballer (born 2001)

Ri Kum Hyang
Personal information
- Full name: Ri Kum Hyang
- Date of birth: 22 April 2001 (age 25)
- Place of birth: North Korea
- Height: 1.68 m (5 ft 6 in)
- Position: Defender

Senior career*
Years	Team	Apps	(Gls)
2012–	Naegohyang FC		

International career
2016–2018	North Korea U-17	10	(1)
2018–2022	North Korea U-20	8	(1)
2023–	North Korea	14	(2)
Medal record
Women's football
Representing North Korea
2022 Asian Games
Runner-up	2022 China
AFC U-20 Women's Asian Cup
Runner-up	2019 Thailand
FIFA U-17 Women's World Cup
Winner	2016 Jordan
AFC U-17 Women's Asian Cup
Winner	2017 Thailand
- * Club domestic league appearances and goals

Ri Kum Hyang (born 22 April 2001, Korean: 리금향 ) is a North Korean professional women's footballer who plays as a center back for DPR Korea Women's Premier League club Naegohyang FC whom she captains, and the North Korea women's national football team.

== Club career ==
Ri joined Naegohyang FC in 2012. In the 2021–22 season, Ri won the DPR Korea Women's Premier League with Naegohyang. She was voted as the best women's defender that year. During the 2025–26 AFC Women's Champions League preliminary rounds which Naegohyang qualified for, Ri scored her first goal at continental level against RTC FC.

== International career ==
On 24 September 2023, she made her debut for North Korea against Singapore women's national football team at the 2022 Asian Games, she also scored a goal in 7–0 victory.

== International goals ==
=== North Korea U17 ===
No.	Date	Venue	Opponent	Score	Result	Competition
1.	17 November 2018	Estadio Profesor Alberto Suppici, Colonia del Sacramento, Uruguay	United States	1–0	3–0	2018 FIFA U-17 Women's World Cup

=== North Korea U20 ===
No.	Date	Venue	Opponent	Score	Result	Competition
1.	18 May 2019	Stade d'Honneur Marcel Roustan, Salon-de-Provence, France	Haiti	4–0	4–0	2019 Sud Ladies Cup
2.	27 October 2019	IPE Chonburi Stadium, Chonburi. Thailand	Australia	3–1	5–1	2019 AFC U-19 Women's Championship

=== National team ===
Scores and results are list North Korea's goal tally first.

No.	Date	Venue	Opponent	Score	Result	Competition
1.	24 September 2023	Wenzhou Sports Centre, Wenzhou, China	Singapore	2–0	7–0	2022 Asian Games
2.	4 December 2023	Sukoka Sports Training Base, Zhuhai, China	Northern Mariana Islands	9–0	17–0	2025 EAFF E-1 Football Championship

=== Naegohyang ===
No.	Date	Venue	Opponent	Score	Result	Competition
1.	28 August 2025	New Laos National Stadium, Vientiane, Laos	(Bhutan) Royal Thimphu College	6–0	7–0	2025–26 AFC Women's Champions League preliminary round
2.	15 November 2025	Thuwunna Stadium, Yangon, Myanmar	(Myanmar) ISPE	2–0	3–0	2025–26 AFC Women's Champions League
3.	4 November 2026	Thuwunna Stadium, Yangon, Myanmar	(Iran) Bam Khatoon	2–0	6–1	2026–27 AFC Women's Champions League
