= Ghanaman Soccer Center of Excellence =

Football training centre in Ghana

The Ghanaman Soccer Centre of Excellence (GSCE), also known as the technical centre of the Ghana Football Association, was built in 2004 through the FIFA Goal Project and handed over to the association in 2008. The Centre is located at Miotso, in the Ningo Prampram District of the Greater Accra Region.

Built on a 68-acre parcel of land, the centre is the home of Ghanaian football for camping and mental rejuvenation.

== Facilities ==
The centre's facilities includes an administration block, two natural grass pitches, one artificial turf pitch, a multipurpose hall, conference rooms, dormitories for 308 people and convenience shop. The site also has an outdoor space for sport, business and entertainment events and spacious car park.

The former Ghana Premier League headline sponsor BetPawa commenced the construction of a park at the centre which included a standard FIFA pitch capable of hosting matches, a changing room, VIP stand and a sitting capacity.

During the COVID-19 pandemic, The Ghana Football Association (GFA) made the centre available for usage as a coronavirus isolation centre. In 2019, Women's coaches in the West African nation went a five-day training programme organised by the world governing body at the centre for excellence. The 32 coaches who participated in the programme were drawn from the women's national teams, the Women's National League clubs and some selected schools in the country.

The Federation of International Football Association (FIFA) under its Forward Program installed ultramodern floodlights at the Ghanaman Soccer Centre of Excellence in 2024.

== Women's Premier League Super Cup ==
The official venue for the fourth edition of the Women's Premier League Super Cup will be the Ghanaman Soccer Centre of Excellence.

== See also ==
- Accra Sports Stadium
- Baba Yara Sports Stadium
- TNA Park
