= AFC Women's Champions League =

Asian association football tournament for women's clubs

- Organiser(s): AFC
- Founded: 2024; 2 years ago
- Region: Asia
- Teams: 12 (group stage)
- Qualifier for: FIFA Women's Club World Cup; FIFA Women's Champions Cup
- Current champions: (North Korea) Naegohyang (1st title)
- Most championships: (North Korea) Naegohyang (China) Wuhan Jiangda (1 title each)
- Website: the-afc.com
- 2026–27 AFC Women's Champions League

The AFC Women's Champions League is the top-tier women's football club competition in Asia. It involves the top clubs from countries affiliated with the Asian Football Confederation (AFC). The tournament was established in 2024.

== History ==
The concept of an Asian women's club competition was first recommended in 2018. The following year, the inaugural edition of the AFC Women's Club Championship, a pilot women's club championship for Asian teams, was held as a round-robin tournament among four teams.

In 2023, the format for the new club competition called AFC Women's Champions League was unveiled. Starting with the 2024–25 edition, the competition includes a preliminary stage, a twelve-team group stage and a knockout stage. Each association gets one team to enter. In the first four seasons, there will be one entry per participating member association, with allocation based on the AFC Women's Club Competitions Ranking, which will combine their clubs' performance in the AFC Women's Champions League and the latest FIFA Women's World Ranking as follow:

- up to 2027–28: 70% club points + 30% national team points;
- from 2028–29 to 2029–30: 90% club points + 10% national team points;
- from 2030–31 onwards: 100% club points

== Results ==
AFC Women's Champions League editions
Edition	Year	Winners	Result	Runners-up	Final venue	Number of teams
1	2024–25	(China) Wuhan Jiangda	1–1 (a.e.t.) (5–4 p)	(Australia) Melbourne City	Wuhan Sports Centre Stadium, Wuhan	21
2	2025–26	(North Korea) Naegohyang	1–0	(Japan) Tokyo Verdy Beleza	Suwon Sports Complex, Suwon	25
3	2026–27					30

== Records and statistics ==
=== Performances by club ===
Performances in the AFC Women's Champions League by club
Club	Winners	Runners-up	Years won	Years runners-up
(China) Wuhan Jiangda	1	0	2024–25	—
(North Korea) Naegohyang	1	0	2025–26	—
(Australia) Melbourne City	0	1	—	2024–25
(Japan) Tokyo Verdy Beleza	0	1	—	2025–26

=== Performances by nation ===
Performances in the AFC Women's Champions League by nation
Nation	Winners	Runners-up
China	1	0
North Korea	1	0
Australia	0	1
Japan	0	1

== Awards ==
Edition	Best player	Top scorer	Goals	Fair play award
2024–25	(New Zealand) Rebekah Stott	(Japan) Yuzuho Shiokoshi	4	(Australia) Melbourne City
2025–26	(North Korea) Kim Kyong-yong	(Australia) Holly McNamara	4	(Vietnam) Hồ Chí Minh City

== Prize money ==
Starting with the 2024–25 season, the distribution of the prize money is as follows.

- Group stage: $100,000
- Quarter-finals: $80,000
- Semi-finals: $120,000
- Runners-up: $500,000
- Champions: $1,000,000

== See also ==
- FIFA Women's Club World Cup
- Continental football championships
- AFC Women's Club Championship
- SAFF Club Women's Championship
