= 2026–27 East Bengal FC Women season =

2026–27 football season for East Bengal FC Women

East Bengal Women
2026–27 season
- Owner: Emami East Bengal Football Club Pvt. Ltd.
- Head coach: Anthony Andrews
- Stadium: East Bengal Ground
- Indian Women's League: preseason
- Calcutta Football League: preseason
- AFC Champions League: Group stage
- SAFF Club Championship: preseason
Home colours	Away colours	Third colours
- All statistics correct as of 2 July 2026.

The 2026–27 season is the 8th season in the history of East Bengal Women. The team would compete in the Indian Women's League and the Calcutta Women's Football League and also, would participate in the 2026–27 AFC Women's Champions League and 2026 SAFF Women's Club Championship after being champions of the 2025–26 Indian Women's League.

== Background ==
East Bengal Women's team defended the Indian Women's League title, winning it for the second time in the 2025–26 season and again qualified for the 2026–27 AFC Women's Champions League. On 7 July, East Bengal club announced the extension of the two-time champion head coach Anthony Andrews for two more seasons.

== Current squad ==
As of 1 August 2025

Note: Flags indicate national team as defined under FIFA eligibility rules; some limited exceptions apply. Players may hold more than one non-FIFA nationality.

No.	Pos.	Nation	Player
1	GK	IND	Panthoi Chanu Elangbam
2	DF	IND	Sweety Devi Ngangbam (captain)
3	MF	IND	Riya Sarkar
4	DF	IND	Ashalata Devi Loitongbam
5	DF	IND	Astam Oraon
6	DF	IND	Sarita Yumnam
7	MF	IND	Soumya Guguloth
8	MF	IND	Sangita Basfore
9	FW	IND	Anju Tamang
10	FW	UGA	Fazila Ikwaput
11	MF	IND	Priyangka Devi Naorem
12	FW	IND	Sandhiya Ranganathan
14	MF	IND	Karthika Angamuthu
15	MF	IND	Sushmita Bardhan
16	FW	UGA	Resty Nanziri
17	MF	IND	Sathi Debnath
18	MF	IND	Thandamoni Baskey

No.	Pos.	Nation	Player
19	DF	IND	Shilky Devi Hemam
21	DF	GHA	Abena Anoma Opoku
22	FW	IND	Sulanjana Raul
23	FW	IND	Titli Sarkar
26	FW	IND	Priyanka Sujeesh
27	MF	IND	Cindy Remruatpuii Colney
30	MF	IND	Deblina Bhattacharjee
34	FW	IND	Sandhya Maity
41	GK	IND	Buli Sarkar
62	MF	IND	Sushmita Lepcha
77	MF	IND	Sonali Chemate
—	DF	IND	Supriya Kispotta
—	GK	IND	Melody Chanu Keisham
—	GK	IND	Payal Basude

== Competitions ==
=== Overall record ===
Competition	First match	Last match	Starting round	Record							
Competition	First match	Last match	Starting round	Pld	W	D	L	GF	GA	GD	Win %
AFC Women's Champions League	17 August 2026		Preliminary round	6	4	0	2	21	7	+14	66.67
Indian Women's League	13 November 2026		Round 1	1	1	0	0	1	0	+1	100.00
Calcutta Women's Football League				0	0	0	0	0	0	+0	—
SAFF Club Women's Championship				0	0	0	0	0	0	+0	—
Total				7	5	0	2	22	7	+15	71.43

Last updated: 13 November 2026
Source: Soccerway

=== AFC Women's Champions League ===
==== Preliminary Round ====
East Bengal qualified for the 2026–27 AFC Women's Champions League after being the champions of the 2025–26 Indian Women's League. East Bengal was grouped into group A of the Preliminary round alongside hosts Sabah of Malaysia, Rovers of Guam and Rajshahi Stars of Bangladesh, with all the matches of the group set to be played at the Likas Stadium in Sabah, Malaysia. On 17 August 2026, East Bengal started their preliminary stage campaign against Rajshahi Stars and won 4–0. In the second match against Rovers, East Bengal created a record of the biggest margin of victory by any Indian team in AFC competitions as they won 12–0. In the last match against hosts Sabah, East Bengal defeated the Malaysian team 2–0 to win the group and qualify for the group stages of the AFC Women's Champions League. East Bengal became the first Indian team to make back-to-back AFC women's champions league group stage appearances.

===== Table =====
Pos	Team	Pld	W	D	L	GF	GA	GD	Pts	Qualification
1	(India) East Bengal	3	3	0	0	18	0	+18	9	Advance to group stage
2	(Malaysia) Sabah (H)	3	2	0	1	15	3	+12	6	
3	(Bangladesh) Rajshahi Stars	3	1	0	2	9	6	+3	3	
4	(Guam) Rovers	3	0	0	3	0	33	−33	0	

Source: AFC
Rules for classification: Tiebreakers
(H) Hosts

===== Matches =====
Win Draw Loss Void

17 August 2026 Preliminary Round	East Bengal (India)	4–0	(Bangladesh) Rajshahi Stars	Sabah, Malaysia
13:30 IST	Anokye 9' (pen.), 38'; Oraon 26'; Guguloth 71'	AFC Report; GSA Report		Stadium: Likas Stadium; Attendance: 80; Referee: Mu Mingxin (China)

20 August 2026 Preliminary Round	Rovers (Guam)	0–12	(India) East Bengal	Sabah, Malaysia
13:30 IST		AFC Report; GSA Report	Naorem 6', 23'; Oraon 15'; Anokye 48', 58'; Antwi 49'; Raul 51'; Hemam 56'; Opoku 64', 70'; Kayenpaibam 73'; Guguloth 90+3'	Stadium: Likas Stadium; Attendance: 40; Referee: Hanine Merhi (Lebanon)

23 August 2026 Preliminary Round	East Bengal (India)	2–0	(Malaysia) Sabah	Sabah, Malaysia
17:30 IST	Anokye 68'; Guguloth 87'	AFC Report; GSA Report		Stadium: Likas Stadium; Attendance: 548; Referee: Mu Mingxin (China)

==== Main tournament ====
East Bengal got chosen as one of the hosts for the group stage, being the first even Indian club to host a group stage for the AFC Women's Champions League. On 3 September, the draw for the group stage took place and East Bengal was grouped alongside Hwacheon KSPO of South Korea, Ho Chi Minh City of Vietnam and April 25 of North Korea in the Group B, with all the matches to be played in Kolkata, India. On 1 November, East Bengal faced Ho Chi Minh City at the Kishore Bharati Krirangan and won 2–1 with Ugandian forward Fazila Ikwaput scoring a brace for the team. On 4 November, East Bengal lost 1–4 to South Korean champions Hwacheon KSPO with Fazila Ikwaput scoring the only goal for the Moshal Girls. On 7 November, East Bengal faced April 25 of North Korea and even though they suffered a 2–0 defeat, the Moshal Girls created history to become the first even Indian women's team to qualify for the knockout stages of the AFC Women's Champions League with a better goal difference to finish as one of the best third placed teams.

===== Table =====
Pos	Team	Pld	W	D	L	GF	GA	GD	Pts	Qualification
1	(North Korea) April 25	3	3	0	0	10	1	+9	9	Advance to Quarter-finals
2	(South Korea) Hwacheon KSPO	3	2	0	1	8	4	+4	6	Advance to Quarter-finals
3	(India) East Bengal (H)	3	1	0	2	3	7	−4	3	Advance to Quarter-finals
4	(Vietnam) Hồ Chí Minh City	3	0	0	3	2	11	−9	0	

Source: AFC
Rules for classification: Tiebreakers
(H) Hosts

Quarter-finals
27–28 March – TBA
Seeded
Unseeded
27–28 March – TBA
Seeded
Unseeded
27–28 March – TBA
Seeded
Unseeded
27–28 March – TBA
Seeded
Unseeded

Semi-finals
19 May – TBA
QF1 Winner
QF2 Winner
19 May – TBA
QF3 Winner
QF4 Winner

Final
22 May – TBA
SF1 Winner
SF2 Winner

===== Matches =====
Win Draw Loss Void

1 November 2026 Group stage	Hồ Chí Minh City (Vietnam)	1–2	(India) East Bengal	Kolkata, India
20:00 IST	Đậu Nguyễn Quỳnh Anh 60'	AFC Report; GSA Report	Ikwaput 21' (pen.), 34'	Stadium: Kishore Bharati Krirangan; Attendance: 522; Referee: Yoshimi Yamashita (Japan)

4 November 2026 Group stage	East Bengal (India)	1–4	(South Korea) Hwacheon KSPO	Kolkata, India
20:00 IST	Ikwaput 17'	AFC Report; GSA Report	Lee Su-bin 26'; Wie Jae-eun 53' (pen.), 76'; Mun Eun-ju 56'	Stadium: Kishore Bharati Krirangan; Referee: Mu Mingxin (China)

7 November 2026 Group stage	East Bengal (India)	0–2	(North Korea) April 25	Kolkata, India
20:00 IST		AFC Report; GSA Report	Han Jin-hong 2'; Oh Sol-song 43'	Stadium: Kishore Bharati Krirangan; Referee: Mahnaz Zokaee (Iran)

27–28 March 2027 Quarter-finals	TBD	v	(India) East Bengal
--:-- IST		[ AFC Report] [ GSA Report]

=== Indian Women's League ===
East Bengal is the two times defending champions of the Indian Women's League. They began their title defense against Gokulam Kerala on 13 November 2026 at the Kalyani Stadium with a one–nil win.

==== League table ====
Pos	Team	Pld	W	D	L	GF	GA	GD	Pts
2	Sethu	1	1	0	0	2	1	+1	3
3	Nita	1	1	0	0	2	1	+1	3
4	East Bengal	1	1	0	0	1	0	+1	3
5	Garhwal United	1	0	0	1	1	2	−1	0
6	Kickstart	1	0	0	1	1	2	−1	0

Updated to match(es) played on 17 November 2026. Source: IFL
Rules for classification: 1) points; 2) head-to-head points; 3) head-to-head goal difference; 4) goal difference; 5) number of goals scored; 6)drawing of lots

==== Results by match ====
Match	1	2
Ground	H	
Result	W	
Position	1	

Updated to match(es) played on 13 November 2026. Source: I-League
A = Away; H = Home; W = Win; D = Draw; L = Loss

===== Matches =====
Win Draw Loss Void

13 November 2026 1	East Bengal	1–0	Gokulam Kerala	Kalyani
19:00	Ikwaput 90+2'	IFL; Report		Stadium: Kalyani Stadium; Attendance: 759; Referee: Sen Hangma Subba; Player of the Match: Shreya Hooda (Gokulam Kerala)

19 November 2026 2	Nita	v	East Bengal	Kalyani
19:00		Report		Stadium: Kalyani Stadium

23 November 2026 3	Kickstart	v	East Bengal	Kalyani
19:00		Report		Stadium: Kalyani Stadium

27 November 2026 4	Garhwal United	v	East Bengal	Kalyani
19:00		Report		Stadium: Kalyani Stadium

3 December 2026 5	East Bengal	v	Sethu	Kalyani
19:00		Report		Stadium: Kalyani Stadium

10 December 2026 6	East Bengal	v	HOPS	Jamshedpur
19:00		Report		Stadium: Tata Football Ground

14 December 2026 7	East Bengal	v	Juba Sangha	Jamshedpur
19:00		Report		Stadium: Tata Football Ground

== Statistics ==
=== Goal scorers ===
As of 13 November 2026

Rank	No.	Pos.	Nat.	Name	AFC Women's Champions League	SAFF Club Championship	Indian Women's League	Kanyashree Cup	Total
1	80	FW	(Ghana)	Olivia Anokye	5	—	—	—	5
2	10	FW	(Uganda)	Fazila Ikwaput	3	—	1	—	4
3	7	RW	(India)	Soumya Guguloth	3	—	—	—	3
4	5	DF	(India)	Astam Oraon	2	—	—	—	2
4	11	MF	(India)	Naorem Priyangka Devi	2	—	—	—	2
6	19	MF	(India)	Hemam Shilky Devi	1	—	—	—	1
6	21	DF	(Ghana)	Abena Anoma Opoku	1	—	—	—	1
6	22	FW	(India)	Sulanjana Raul	1	—	—	—	1
6	28	FW	(Ghana)	Abigail Antwi	1	—	—	—	1
6	50	MF	(India)	Anju Chanu Kayenpaibam	1	—	—	—	1
Own Goals					0	0	0	0	0
Total					21	0	1	0	22

=== Assists ===
As of 13 November 2026

Rank	No.	Pos.	Nat.	Name	AFC Women's Champions League	SAFF Club Championship	Indian Women's League	Kanyashree Cup	Total
1	19	MF	(India)	Hemam Shilky Devi	4	—	—	—	4
2	22	FW	(India)	Sulanjana Raul	3	—	—	—	3
3	5	LB	(India)	Astam Oraon	2	—	—	—	2
3	6	DF	(India)	Sarita Yumnam	2	—	—	—	2
5	2	CB	(Japan)	Hitomi Tanaka	1	—	—	—	1
5	7	RW	(India)	Soumya Guguloth	1	—	—	—	1
5	67	LW	(India)	Rimpa Haldar	0	—	1	—	1
5	80	FW	(Ghana)	Olivia Anokye	1	—	—	—	1
Total					14	0	1	—	15

== See also ==
- 2026–27 in Indian football
- 2026–27 East Bengal FC season (Men's)
