= 2026 Bhutan Women's National League =

Bhutan Women's National League
- Season: 2026
- Dates: 2 August – 13 October
- Country: Bhutan
- Teams: Tier I - 6 Teams; Tier II - 4 Teams
- Champions: Paro FC
- AFC Women's Champions League: Paro FC
- Top goalscorer: Holali Ativor

The 2026 Bhutan Women's National League (known as the Bank of Bhutan Bhutan Women's National League for sponsorship reasons) was the 11th season of the Bhutan Women's National League, the top women's football league in Bhutan. The competition was organised by the Bhutan Football Federation and featured six teams in Tier I.

== Background ==
RTC entered the 2026 season as the defending champions of the Bhutan Women's National League, having won the 2025 edition. The club went on to secure its fourth consecutive league title.

The three-month-long competition concluded at the Changlimithang Football Stadium. In the decisive match, Thimpu City FC defeated RTC 3–1, preventing RTC from lifting the trophy. Paro FC won the championship with highest point.

Holali Ativor of Thimpu City WFC received Highest Goalscorer awards. Pichayatida Manowang of Thimpu City WFC won the Most Valuable Player. Gopal Rai of Paro FC was named President's Coach of the Season, while Kelden Wangmo of Transport United Ladies received the Young Emerging Player of the Season award. Paro FC goalkeeper Mary NF Gomez has won the Best Goalkeeper award.

== Teams ==
6 teams competed in the 2026 season.

Team
Paro
Transport United
Thimphu City
Ugyen Academy
RTC
Gelephu Girls Academy (U-20)

== Foreign players ==
Team	Player 1	Player 2	Player 3	Player 4	Player 5	Player 6	Player 7	Player 8	Player 9
Paro	(The Gambia) Mary NF Gomez	(Bangladesh) Sabina Khatun	(Bangladesh) Masura Parvin	(Nepal) Renuka Nagarkoti	(Nepal) Saru Limbu				
Transport United	(Nepal) Rashmi Kumari Ghishing	(Nepal) Anita KC	(Nepal) Gita Rana	(Nepal) Meena Deuba	(Nepal) Birsana Chaudhary	(Nepal) Dipa Shahi	(Pakistan) Suha Hirani		
Thimphu City	(Nepal) Puja Rana	(Ghana) Holali Ativor					(Thailand) Pichayatida Manowang		
Royal Thimphu College	(Ghana) Deborah Agyei Kuruwaa	(United States) Grace Simon	(United States) Jaqueline Catano				(Philippines) Yanzie Yalong		
Ugyen Academy FC									

== League table ==
Pos	Team	Pld	W	D	L	GF	GA	GD	Pts	Qualification or relegation
1	Paro (C)	10	7	3	0	43	6	+37	24	Champions
2	RTC	10	7	2	1	48	6	+42	23	
3	Thimphu City	10	7	1	2	47	9	+38	22	
4	Transport United	10	4	0	6	33	24	+9	12	
5	Gelephu Girls Academy U20	10	1	1	8	12	66	−54	4	
6	Ugyen Academy	10	0	1	9	8	80	−72	1	

Rules for classification: 1) Points; 2) Goal difference; 3) Goals scored.
(C) Champions
