= Shaheda Akter Ripa =

Bangladeshi footballer

Personal information
- Full name: Shaheda Akter Ripa
- Date of birth: 8 December 2005 (age 20)
- Place of birth: Sonai Chhari, Jaliapalong, Ukhia, Cox's Bazar District, Bangladesh
- Height: 1.45 m (4 ft 9 in)
- Position: Forward

Team information
- Current team: Rajshahi Stars
- Number: 10

Youth career
- BKSP

Senior career*
| Years | Team | Apps | (Gls) |
| 2021–2024 | ARB College | 33 | (23) |
| 2025 | Royal Thimphu College | 5 | (0) |
| 2025– | Rajshahi Stars | 10 | (11) |

International career^{‡}
| 2019–2022 | Bangladesh U-17 | 4 | (2) |
| 2021– | Bangladesh U-20 | 14 | (10) |
| 2023– | Bangladesh | 25 | (1) |
Medal record
Women's football
Representing Bangladesh
SAFF Women's Championship
| Winner | 2024 Nepal |
SAFF U-20 Women's Championship
| Winner | 2023 Bangladesh |
| Winner | 2021 Bangladesh |
- * Club domestic league appearances and goals as of 19 February 2026 ‡ National team caps and goals as of 17 September 2026

Shaheda Akter Ripa (Bengali: শাহেদা আক্তার রিপা IPA: [ʃaheda aktaɾ ɾipa]; born 8 December 2005) is a Bangladeshi footballer who plays as a forward for Rajshahi Stars and the Bangladesh national team.

== Early career ==
Ripa's football career began in the youth leagues of Bangladesh. She caught wide attention with her performance at the Bangladesh Youth Games and the JFA Cup, where she became the top scorer. In 2019, she selected for Bangladesh U-16.

== Club career ==
=== Royal Thimphu College ===
In 2025, Shaheda joined Bhutan Women's National League club Royal Thimphu College and played in the 2025–26 AFC Women's Champions League.

=== Rajshahi Stars ===
On 22 December 2025, she joined Rajshahi Stars for the 2025–26 Bangladesh Women's Football League season. She scored twice for the club in her debut match.

== International career ==
Ripa's international debut with the Bangladesh Under-16 team took place in 2019 during the AFC U-17 Women's Asian Cup qualifiers. Since then, she has played in various tournaments, contributing to the team's performances in the SAFF U-15 Women's Championship and other regional competitions.

In 2021, Ripa gained widespread recognition after leading Bangladesh to victory in the SAFF U-19 Women's Championship. She emerged as the top goal scorer with five goals, helping Bangladesh secure the title against India in the final match. In 2023, she joined the senior Bangladesh women's national team, continuing to display her attacking skills.

== Personal life ==
In 2022, Ripa auctioned her Best Goal Scorer trophy from the 2022 SAFF U-19 Championship to raise funds for flood victims in Sylhet. She expressed her commitment to helping the affected communities and viewed this act as a meaningful way to contribute to those in need.

== Career statistics ==
As of match played 5 July 2025

Scores and results list Bangladesh's goal tally first, score column indicates score after each Shaheda Akter Ripa goal.

List of international goals scored by Shaheda Akter Ripa
| No. | Date | Venue | Opponent | Score | Result | Competition |
|---|---|---|---|---|---|---|
| 1 | 3 June 2025 | King Abdullah II Stadium, Amman, Jordan | Jordan | 2–2 | 2–2 | Friendly |

== Honours ==
Royal Thimphu College

- Bhutan Women's National League: 2025

Rajshahi Stars

- Bangladesh Women's Football League: 2025–26

Bangladesh U-20

- SAFF Women's Championship: 2021

Bangladesh

- SAFF Women's Championship: 2024
