= 2025 Bhutan Women's National League =

Bhutan Women's National League
- Season: 2025
- Dates: 10 May – 6 November
- Champions: RTC
- AFC Women's Champions League: RTC
- Top goalscorer: Deki Lhazom

The 2025 Bhutan Women's National League (known as the Bank of Bhutan Bhutan Women's National League for sponsorship reasons) was the 10th season of the Bhutan Women's National League, the top women's football league in Bhutan. The competition was organised by the Bhutan Football Federation and featured ten teams.

== Background ==
RTC entered the 2025 season as the defending champions of the Bhutan Women's National League, having won the 2024 edition. The club went on to secure its third consecutive league title after finishing level on points with Paro and prevailing in the head-to-head comparison.

The six-month-long competition concluded at the RTC Artificial Turf. In the decisive match, RTC WFC defeated Transport United 3–0 to secure the championship.

Deki Lhazom of RTC received both the Most Valuable Player and Highest Goalscorer awards. Karma Dema of Transport United was named President's Coach of the Season, while Yeyang Gisel Wangchuk of BFF Academy received the Young Emerging Player of the Season award. Transport United Ladies won the Fair Play Award.

== Teams ==
Ten teams competed in the 2025 season. Originally, The Royal Academy Women FC was scheduled to participate but withdrew before the start of the league and was replaced by Gelephu U-17 Academy.

Team
Gelephu City
Paro
Transport United
Samtse
Thimphu City
Phuentsholing
UA
RTC
Gelephu Girls Academy (U-20)
Gelephu U-17 Academy

== Foreign players ==
| Team | Player 1 | Player 2 | Player 3 | Player 4 | Player 5 | Player 6 | Player 7 | Player 8 | Player 9 |
|---|---|---|---|---|---|---|---|---|---|
| Paro | (United States) Taylor Spiller | (Bangladesh) Sabina Khatun | (Bangladesh) Ritu Porna Chakma | (Bangladesh) Monika Chakma | (Bangladesh) Matsushima Sumaya | (Bangladesh) Sheuli Azim | (Bangladesh) Nilufa Yesmin Nila | (Bangladesh) Lipi Akter | (Hong Kong) Fung Sharon |
| Transport United | (Bangladesh) Masura Parvin | (Bangladesh) Rupna Chakma | (Bangladesh) Krishna Rani Sarkar | (Nepal) Puja Rana | (Nepal) Birsana Chaudhary | (Nepal) Samjhana Lawati | | | |
| Thimphu City | (Bangladesh) Maria Manda | (Bangladesh) Sanjida Akter | (Bangladesh) Shamsunnahar | (Nepal) Anjali Chand | (Nepal) Savina Chaudhary | (India) Sonali Mondal | | | |
| Royal Thimphu College | (Bangladesh) Tohura Khatun | (Bangladesh) Shamsunnahar Jr. | (Bangladesh) Shaheda Akter Ripa | (Bangladesh) Sapna Rani | (Bangladesh) Afeida Khandaker | (United States) Jaqueline Catano | | | |

== League table ==
| Pos | Team | Pld | W | D | L | GF | GA | GD | Pts | Qualification or relegation |
|---|---|---|---|---|---|---|---|---|---|---|
| 1 | RTC (C) | 18 | 15 | 3 | 0 | 182 | 5 | +177 | 48 | Champions |
| 2 | Paro | 18 | 15 | 3 | 0 | 130 | 17 | +113 | 48 | |
| 3 | Transport United | 18 | 13 | 3 | 2 | 122 | 9 | +113 | 42 | |
| 4 | Thimphu City | 18 | 11 | 1 | 6 | 136 | 29 | +107 | 34 | |
| 5 | Gelephu Girls Academy U20 | 18 | 10 | 0 | 8 | 71 | 52 | +19 | 30 | |
| 6 | Ugyen Academy | 18 | 9 | 0 | 9 | 96 | 34 | +62 | 27 | |
| 7 | Gelephu Girls Academy U17 | 18 | 5 | 0 | 13 | 42 | 96 | −54 | 15 | |
| 8 | Gelephu City | 18 | 3 | 0 | 15 | 19 | 171 | −152 | 9 | |
| 9 | Phuntsholing Heroes | 18 | 1 | 0 | 17 | 11 | 252 | −241 | 3 | |
| 10 | Samtse | 18 | 3 | 0 | 15 | 11 | 155 | −144 | 9 | |

Rules for classification: 1) Points; 2) Goal difference; 3) Goals scored.
(C) Champions
