= S'Amuser FC =

- Full name: S'amuser Futebol Clube
- Founded: 2018; 8 years ago
- League: Liga Futebol Feminino de Timor-Leste
- 2025–26: 1st of 10 (Champions)
Home colours	Away colours

S'amuser Futebol Clube is a Timorese women's football and futsal club based in Dili. It competes in the Campeonato Timorense de Futebol Feminino, the top tier of women's football in the country.

== History ==
S'Amuser FC was established in 2018. The club's name is derived from the French reflexive verb s'amuser, meaning "to have fun" or "to enjoy oneself".

The club competed in the inaugural edition of the Timorese women's championship in 2019, reaching the semi-finals. In the following season, The Dili-based club finished third in the league, qualifying for the inaugural Copa Timorense de Futebol Feminino. where they were eliminated in the semi-finals.

In 2021, S'Amuser won their first Liga Futebol Feminino Timor-Leste title. The club added its first domestic cup trophy the following year, defeating SL Benfica 3–1 in the final of the Copa Timorense de Futebol Feminino. In 2026, they won their second league title in the 2025–26 season, finishing first with 45 points. As league champions, the club qualified for the preliminary stage of the 2026–27 AFC Women's Champions League, becoming the first club from Timor-Leste to compete in an AFC women's club competition. They were drawn into Group D alongside College of Asian Scholars of Thailand, 4.25 of North Korea, and Kharaatsai of Mongolia.

== Players ==
=== Current squad ===
As of 22 March 2026

Note: Flags indicate national team as defined under FIFA eligibility rules; some limited exceptions apply. Players may hold more than one non-FIFA nationality.

No.	Pos.	Nation	Player
—	FW	TLS	Letizia Soares
—	MF	TLS	Danila Guterres
—	FW	TLS	Nivia Gueterres
—	MF	IDN	Erlin Lawalu
—	GK	TLS	Madalena Soares
—	MF	TLS	Devona Cunha
—	DF	TLS	Dimivia Branco
—	DF	TLS	Natalia Joana
—	MF	TLS	Benigna Silva

No.	Pos.	Nation	Player
—	DF	TLS	Maria Fatima
—	GK	TLS	Elania Godinho
—	DF	TLS	Ferelia Sousa
—	DF	TLS	Brigida da Costa
—	DF	TLS	Godelivia Martins
—	FW	TLS	Dolores Costa
—	FW	IDN	Carla Bio
—	FW	IDN	Marsela Awi

== Honours ==
=== Domestic ===
- Campeonato Timorense de Futebol Feminino (2; record)

2019, 2025–26

- Copa Timorense de Futebol Feminino (1)

2022
