= 2025–26 Myanmar Women's League =

Myanmar Women League
- Season: 2025–26
- Dates: 22 April 2025 - 31 January 2026
- Champions: Ayeyawady
- AFC Champions League: Ayeyawady
- Matches: 72
- Goals: 253 (3.51 per match)
- Best Player: Phyu Phyu Win
- Top goalscorer: Zin Moe Pyae (22 goals)
- Best goalkeeper: Ei Sandar Zaw (9 matches)
- Biggest home win: Yangon United 8–0 Young Lionesses (6 May 2025)
- Biggest away win: Yangon City 0–5 Ayeyawady (6 May 2025)
- Highest scoring: Yangon United 8–0 Young Lionesses (6 May 2025)
- Longest winning run: Yangon United (4 matches)
- Longest unbeaten run: Ayeyawady (15 matches)
- Longest winless run: Yangon City (16 matches)
- Longest losing run: Yangon City (13 matches)

The 2025–26 Myanmar Women's League is the 7th season of the Myanmar Women's League, the top Myanmar professional league for women's association football clubs, since its establishment in 2016. The season officially kicked off on 1 April 2025 and will run until 31 January 2026, divided into two legs: the first from April to September and the second from December to January. Matches are being hosted across several key venues, including Thuwunna Training field-1, Padonmar Stadium, and the YUSC Sports Complex, with ISPE playing their home games at Padethar Stadium. ISPE W.F.C. entered the season as the defending champions.

== Season overview ==
The season was played over an extended calendar from 2025 to 2026, featuring a double round-robin format and involving nine clubs from across the country including defending champions ISPE, along with Yangon United, Ayeyawady, Myawady, Thitsar Arman, Shan United, YREO, Yangon City and the Young Lionesses (Myanmar women U-17).

The 2025–26 Myanmar Women's League was played over an extended calendar and included a mid-season transfer period, which ran from 1 November 2025 to 30 November 2025, allowing clubs to register new players and make squad adjustments for the remainder of the season.

The campaign was marked by a closely contested title race, particularly between Ayeyawady and ISPE W.F.C., who emerged as the league's leading sides throughout the season. The championship was ultimately decided in the final fixture, which saw the two teams face each other with the league title at stake.

Heading into the match, Ayeyawady required only a win or a draw to secure the championship and become new Myanmar Women's League champions. ISPE, meanwhile, needed victory to overtake their rivals in the standings. A win for ISPE would have resulted in the club claiming the league title for a fourth time, further extending their status as the most successful team in Myanmar Women's League history. The decisive nature of the final match highlighted the growing competitiveness of the league and underscored the continued development of women's football in Myanmar during the 2025–26 season.

Ayeyawady W.F.C. secured the 2025–26 Myanmar Women's League title, becoming the new champions of the competition after finishing top of the league standings.

== Personnel and sponsorship ==
Note: Flags indicate national team as has been defined under FIFA eligibility rules. Players may hold more than one non-FIFA nationality.

Club	Head coach	Captain	Kit manufacturer	Shirt sponsor
Ayeyawady	(Myanmar) U Aung Kyaw Zan	(Myanmar) Lae Lae Hlaing	(Myanmar) Glory Sport	(China) Livan Automotive
ISPE	(Myanmar) Daw San San Thein	(Myanmar) Lin Myint Mo	(Myanmar) Pro Sport	
Myawady	(Myanmar) U Zin Htoo	(Myanmar) Aye Aye Moe	(Myanmar) Glory Sport	
Shan United	(Myanmar) Daw Zin Mar Wann	(Myanmar) Yu Par Khaing	(Myanmar) Foxx	(Myanmar) Emarald
Thitsar Arman	(Myanmar) U Moe Kyaw Htwe	(Myanmar) Chit Chit	(Myanmar) Foxx	
Yangon United	(Myanmar) U Cho Lar	(Myanmar) Swe Mar Aung	(Myanmar) Glory Sport	(Myanmar) FNI
Yangon City	(Myanmar) Sithu Aung	(Myanmar) Aye Aye Thin	(Myanmar) M21	(Myanmar) Spider
Young Lionesses	(Japan) Kumiko Tashiro	(Myanmar) Thae Ei Hlaing	(Japan) Jogarbola	
YREO	(Myanmar) U Ye Wint Thu	(Myanmar) Khin Bhone	(Myanmar) M21	(Myanmar) M21

== Foreign players ==
Players name in bold indicates the player was registered during the mid-season transfer window.

Team	Player 1	Player 2	Player 3	Asia player
Ayeyawady	(Philippines) **Alyssa Ube**	(Japan) **Kirara Ogawa**		

== League table ==
Pos	Team	Pld	W	D	L	GF	GA	GD	Pts	Qualification
1	Ayeyawady **(C)**	16	12	4	0	44	11	+33	40	Qualification to 2026–27 AFC Women's Champions League
2	ISPE	16	11	4	1	47	7	+40	37	
3	Thitsar Arman	16	10	4	2	37	9	+28	34	
4	Yangon United	16	10	3	3	44	17	+27	33	
5	Shan United	16	7	4	5	36	14	+22	25	
6	YREO	16	3	3	10	19	34	−15	12	
7	Young Lionesses	16	3	2	11	9	66	−57	11	
8	Myawady	16	2	3	11	10	38	−28	9	
9	Yangon City	16	0	1	15	7	57	−50	1	

Updated to match(es) played on 31 January 2026. Source:
- **(C)** = Champions

== Results ==
Home \ Away	AYE	ISPE	MWD	SHU	TSM	YC	YGU	YLF	YRE
Ayeyawady		3–3	3–0	3–2	2–1	2–0	1–0	4–0	6–0
ISPE	0–0		2–0	1–0	1–0	6–0	2–2	7–0	3–0
Myawady	0–2	0–3		0–0	0–5	3–1	1–2	1–1	0–1
Shan United	0–3	0–0	5–0		0–0	2–0	1–2	7–0	5–0
Thitsar Arman	2–2	1–0	3–0	0–0		5–0	3–1	4–0	2–0
Yangon City	0–5	0–7	1–3	1–4	1–3		0–2	0–2	0–6
Yangon United	1–1	1–2	6–0	3–1	1–1	5–2		8–0	3–1
Young Lionesses	0–4	0–9	2–1	1–6	0–5	2–1	0–3		1–6
YREO	2–3	0–1	1–1	0–3	1–2	0–0	1–4	0–0	

Updated to match(es) played on 31 January 2026. Source: Results
Legend: Blue = home team win; Yellow = draw; Red = away team win.

== Matches ==
Week 1

22 April 2025	**Yangon United**	**1–2**	**ISPE**	Yangon
16:00 UTC+06:30	Su Su Kyi 60'		Shwe Ye Tun 8'; Moe Ma Ma Soe 21'	Stadium: YUSC Stadium

22 April 2025	**Shan United**	**0–3**	**Ayeyawady**	Yangon
16:00 UTC+06:30			San Thaw Thaw 40', 50'; Naing Naing Win 82'	Stadium: Padonmar Stadium

23 April 2025	**Myawady**	**0–1**	**YREO**	Yangon
16:00 UTC+06:30			Hnin Sandar Win 72'	Stadium: Training field-1

23 April 2025	**Thitsar Arman**	**4–0**	**Young Lionesses**	Yangon
16:00 UTC+06:30	Myat Noe Khin 44', 57', 84'; Khin Mo Mo Tun 62'			Stadium: Padonmar Stadium

Week 2

27 April 2025	**Thitsar Arman**	**5-0**	**Yangon City**	Padonmar Stadium, Yangon
16:00 UTC+06:30	Myat Noe Khin 60', 65' (pen.), 81'; Win Win 74'; Chit Su Wai 90+1'

27 April 2025	**Young Lionesses**	**2-1**	**Myawady**	Training Field-1, Yangon
16:00 UTC+06:30	Pyae Paing Mhue Eain 58'; Nway Nway 89'		May Sabel Phoo 4'

28 April 2025	**Yangon United**	**3-1**	**Shan United**	YUSC Stadium, Yangon
15:30 UTC+06:30	Yoon Wadi Hlaing 3', 57'; Shhon Lai Naing 90+4'		Khaing Thazin 72'

28 April 2025	**Ayeyawady**	**6-0**	**YREO**	Training field-1, Yangon
16:00 UTC+06:30	San Thaw Thaw 31', 45+4', 58', 67'; Phyu Phyu Kyaw 37'; Nant Shin Thant Phyu Sin Phone 87'

Week 3

1 May 2025	**Young Lionesses**	**2-1**	**Yangon City**	Padonmar Stadium, Yangon
16:00 UTC+06:30	Ingyin Khine 20'; Nway Nway 68'		San San Htwe 38'

2 May 2025	**Shan United**	**0-0**	**Thitsar Arman**	Training field-1, Yangon
15:30 UTC+06:30

2 May 2025	**Yangon United**	**6-0**	**Myawady**	YUSC Stadium, Yangon
16:00 UTC+06:30	Zin Moe Pyae 10', 61'; Yoon Wadi Hlaing 19', 44'; Daisy Aung 33'; Nan Yadanar 64'

2 May 2025	**Ayeyawady**	**3-3**	**ISPE**	Padonmar Stadium, Yangon
16:00 UTC+06:30	Phyu Phyu Win 39', 52'; San Thaw Thaw 83'		Shwe Ye Tun 12', 45', 56'

Week 4

6 May 2025	**Shan United**	**5-0**	**YREO**	Training field-1, Yangon
16:00 UTC+06:30	Yu Ya Naing 13'; Yupar Khaing 14', 25'; Nang Phyu Phyu Htwe 35', 47'

6 May 2025	**Yangon United**	**8-0**	**Young Lionesses**	YUSC Stadium, Yangon
16:00 UTC+06:30	Zin Moe Pyae 15', 24', 40', 71'; Su Su Kyi 16'; Yoon Wadi Hlaing 49'; Swe Mar Aung 79'; Chan Myae Tun 87'

6 May 2025	**Yangon City**	**0-5**	**Ayeyawady**	Padonmar Stadium, Yangon
16:00 UTC+06:30			Lae Lae Hlaing 3', 70'; San Thaw Thaw 25'; Phyu Phyu Win 85'; Za Khar Ruzi 24'

7 May 2025	**Thitsar Arman**	**1-0**	**ISPE**	Training field-1, Yangon
16:00 UTC+06:30	Myat Noe Khin 11'

Week 5

4 September 2025	**YREO**	**0-1**	**ISPE**	Padaythar Stadium, Yangon
15:30 UTC+06:30			Sandar Lin 61'

4 September 2025	**Shan United**	**7-0**	**Young Lionesses**	Padonmar Stadium, Yangon
15:30 UTC+06:30	Yu Ya Naing 14'; Khaing Thazin 16'; Nant May Thazin 21'; Saung Hnin Phwe 47'; Nant Phyu Phyu Thwe 55', 90+2'; Sandar Aung 62'

5 September 2025	**Myawady**	**0-5**	**Thitsar Arman**	Padonmar Stadium, Yangon
15:30 UTC+06:30			Wai Phoo Eain 12'; Win Win 31'; Myat Noe Khin 40'; Khin Mo Mo Tun 78'; Thinzar Li Lin 85'

5 September 2025	**Yangon United**	**5-2**	**Yangon City**	YUSC Stadium, Yangon
15:30 UTC+06:30	Swe Mar Aung 12'; Zin Moe Pyae 45+3', 80'; Yu Yu Naing 53'; Nan Cho Hmue 59'		Htate Tin Kyawe 48'; Ja Htoi Bawk 76'

Week 6

10 September 2025	**Yangon City**	**0-7**	**ISPE**	Padonmar Stadium, Yangon
15:30 UTC+06:30			Su Pyae Pyae Kyaw 10'; Moe Pwint Phyu 15'; Wai Hin Phyo 21', 23'; Than Than Nwe 41'; Kay Thwe Phyo Oo 54'; Aye Sandi Htet 57'

11 September 2025	**Yangon United**	**1-1**	**Ayeyawady**	YUSC Stadium, Yangon
15:30 UTC+06:30	Phyu Phwe 43' (pen.)		Phyu Phyu Win 82'

11 September 2025	**Shan United**	**5-0**	**Myawady**	Padonmar Stadium, Yangon
15:30 UTC+06:30	July Kyaw 22'; Khaing Thazin 68', 83', 85'; Nang Bayae 77'

12 September 2025	**Thitsar Arman**	**2-0**	**YREO**	Padonmar Stadium, Yangon
15:30 UTC+06:30	Myat Noe Khin 45+2', 65'

Week 7

16 September 2025	**ISPE**	**1-0**	**Shan United**	Padonmar Stadium, Yangon
15:30 UTC+06:30	Shwe Yee Tun 52'

17 September 2025	**YREO**	**1-4**	**Yangon United**	Padonmar Stadium, Yangon
15:30 UTC+06:30	Ei Thet Phyo 82'		Yoon Wadi Hlaing 3'; Zin Moe Pyae 13', 40', 90+1'

18 September 2025	**Ayeyawady**	**4-0**	**Young Lionesses**	Padonmar Stadium, Yangon
15:30 UTC+06:30	San Thaw Thaw 3', 26', 31'; Phyu Phyu Win 75'

19 September 2025	**Yangon City**	**1-3**	**Myawady**	Padonmar Stadium, Yangon
15:30 UTC+06:30	Hlaing Hlaing Myint 90+2'		Theingi Htwe 2'; May Sabel Phoo 12', 45+2'

Week 8

24 September 2025	**Yangon City**	**0-6**	**YREO**	Padonmar Stadium, Yangon
15:30 UTC+06:30			Hnin Sandar Win 2', 20'; Ei Thet Phyo 64', 86'; Win Sandar 66'; Naw Shu Zar Ni Tun 71'

24 September 2025	**Yangon United**	**1-1**	**Thitsar Arman**	YUSC Stadium, Yangon
15:30 UTC+06:30	Su Su Kyi 60'		Wai Phoo Eain 48'

25 September 2025	**ISPE**	**7-0**	**Young Lionesses**	YUSC Stadium, Yangon
15:30 UTC+06:30	Than Than Nwe 6'; Lin Myint Mo 17'; Su Pyae Pyae Kyaw 18'; Pin Myint Yan 33' (o.g.); Shwe Yee Tun 66', 68'; Yin Loon Eain 78'

25 September 2025	**Myawady**	**0-2**	**Ayeyawady**	Padonmar Stadium, Yangon
15:30 UTC+06:30			San Thaw Thaw 23'; Nant Shin Thant Phyu Zin Pyone 79'

Week 9

29 September 2025	**ISPE**	**2-0**	**Myawady**	YUSC Stadium, Yangon
15:30 UTC+06:30	Khin Marlar Tun 42'; Yin Loon Eain 65'

29 September 2025	**Thitsar Arman**	**2-2**	**Ayeyawady**	Padonmar Stadium, Yangon
15:30 UTC+06:30	Myat Noe Khin 62', 90' (pen.)		San Thaw Thaw 48'; Htet Htet Win 29'

30 September 2025	**Yangon City**	**1-4**	**Shan United**	YUSC Stadium, Yangon
15:30 UTC+06:30	Ingyin Khaing 30'		July Kyaw 16'; Nant May Thazin 29'; Sandar Aung 45+1', 65'

30 September 2025	**Young Lionesses**	**1-6**	**YREO**	Padonmar Stadium, Yangon
15:30 UTC+06:30	Pin Myint Yan 77'		Ei Thet Phyo 5', 19', 51'; Win Sandar 34', 41', 56'

Week 10

24 December 2025	**YREO**	**0-0**	**Young Lionesses**	Training field-1, Yangon
15:30 UTC+06:30

24 December 2025	**Shan United**	**2-0**	**Yangon City**	Padonmar Stadium, Yangon
15:30 UTC+06:30	Sandar Aung 50'; Nang Phyu Phyu Thwe 66'

26 December 2025	**Myawady**	**0-3**	**ISPE**	Training field-1, Yangon
15:30 UTC+06:30			Khin Mar Lar Tun 3'; Su Pyyae Pyae Kyaw 47'; Lin Myint Mo 58'

26 December 2025	**Ayeyawady**	**2-1**	**Thitsar Arman**	Padonmar Stadium, Yangon
15:30 UTC+06:30	Kirara Ogawa 38'; Phyu Phyu Win 90+3'	Report	Nilar Win 21' (pen.)

Week 11

28 December 2025	**YREO**	**0-3**	**Shan United**	Training field-1, Yangon
15:30 UTC+06:30			Yu Ya Naing 45+2'; Nant May Thazin 60'; Yu Per Khaing 90' (pen.)

29 December 2025	**Young Lionesses**	**0-3**	**Yangon United**	YUSC Stadium, Yangon
15:30 UTC+06:30			Zin Moe Pyae 3', 7'; Shoon Lai Naing 85'

30 December 2025	**ISPE**	**1-0**	**Thitsar Arman**	YUSC, Yangon
15:30 UTC+06:30	Than Than Nwe 57'

30 December 2025	**Ayeaywady**	**2-0**	**Yangon City**	Padonmar Stadium, Yangon
15:30 UTC+06:30	Phyu Phyu Win 65'; Zi Tar Shin 72'

Week 12

3 January 2026	**Yangon City**	**1-3**	**Thitsar Arman**	Training field-1, Yangon
15:30 UTC+06:30	Pyar Myar Moe Moe Aye 45+1'		Win Win 12', 37', 61' (pen.)

3 January 2026	**Shan United**	**1-2**	**Yangon United**	Padonmar Stadium, Yangon
15:30 UTC+06:30	July Kyaw 2'		Yu Yu Naing 79'; Yoon Wadi Hlaing 90+1'

3 January 2026	**YREO**	**2-3**	**Ayeyawady**	YUSC, Yangon
15:30 UTC+06:30	Win Sandar 67'; Engin Ko Ko 72'		Su Su Khin 37'; San Thaw Thaw 80', 83'

5 January 2026	**Myawady**	**1-1**	**Young Lionesses**	Training field-1, Yangon
15:30 UTC+06:30

Week 13

7 January 2026	**ISPE**	**6-0**	**Yangon City**	Training field-1, Yangon
15:30 UTC+06:30	Shwe Yee Tun 36', 80'; Lin Myint Mo 49', 50', 70'; Su Pyae Pyae Kyaw 55'

7 January 2026	**Ayeyawady**	**1-0**	**Yangon United**	Padonmar Stadium, Yangon
15:30 UTC+06:30	Phyu Phyu Win 27'

8 January 2026	**YREO**	**1-2**	**Thitsar Arman**	YUSC, Yangon
15:30 UTC+06:30	Win Sandar 21'		Myat Noe Khin 43' (pen.), 78'

9 January 2026	**Myawady**	**0-0**	**Shan United**	Training field-1, Yangon
15:30 UTC+06:30

Week 14

11 January 2026	**Young Lionesses**	**0-9**	**ISPE**	Training field-1, Yangon
15:30 UTC+06:30			Shwe Yee Tun 7', 31', 63' (pen.), 64', 81', 87'; Moe Pwint Phyu 26'; Ka Mon Pa Kaung 49' (o.g.); Su Pyae Pyae Kyaw 67'

12 January 2026	**Thitsar Arman**	**3-1**	**Yangon United**	Padonmar Stadium, Yangon
15:30 UTC+06:30	Khin Mo Mo Tun 17'; Myat Noe Khin 24', 88'		Zin Moe Pyae 48' (pen.)

12 January 2026	**YREO**	**0-0**	**Yangon City**	Training field-1, Yangon
15:30 UTC+06:30

14 January 2026	**Ayeyawady**	**3-0**	**Myawady**	YUSC, Yangon
15:30 UTC+06:30	San Thaw Thaw 1', 24' (pen.), 90+1'

Week 15

16 January 2026	**Young Lionesses**	**1-6**	**Shan United**	Training field-1, Yangon
15:30 UTC+06:30	Shin Thant Phyu Sin Pyone 90+2'		Yu Ya Naing 11'; Nant May Thazin 14', 58' yu Per Khaing 51', 62'; Saung Hnin Phwe 75'

17 January 2026	**Yangon City**	**0-2**	**Yangon United**	YUSC Stadium, Yangon
15:30 UTC+06:30			Zin Moe Pyae 8', 90+3'

17 January 2026	**ISPE**	**3-0**	**YREO**	Padonmar Stadium, Yangon
15:30 UTC+06:30	Moe Moe Than 20'; Thin Zar Cho 42'; Su Pyae Pyae Kyaw 70'

18 January 2026	**Thitsar Arman**	**3-0**	**Myawady**	YUSC, Yangon
15:30 UTC+06:30	Aye Aye Moe 24' (o.g.); Wai Phoo Eain 27'; Myat Noe Khin 69'

Week 16

21 January 2026	**Shan United**	**0-0**	**ISPE**	Training field-1, Yangon
15:30 UTC+06:30

22 January 2026	**Young Lionesses**	**0-4**	**Ayeyawady**	TF-1 Stadium, Yangon
15:30 UTC+06:30			Phyu Phyu Win 1', 8'; San Thaw Thaw 3'; Hnin Ei Lwin 33'

22 January 2026	**Yangon United**	**3-1**	**YREO**	YUSC Stadium, Yangon
15:30 UTC+06:30	Zin Moe Pyae 42', 51', 60'		Hnin Sandar Win 67'

22 January 2026	**Myawady**	**3-1**	**Yangon City**	Padonmar, Yangon
15:30 UTC+06:30	Aye Aye Moe 30'; May July Hlaing 48', 57'		Naing Naing Win 22'

Week 17

26 January 2026	**YREO**	**1-1**	**Myawady**	YUSC, Yangon
15:30 UTC+06:30	Aye Aye Moe 81' (o.g.)		May Sabal Phoo 90+1'

26 January 2026	**Young Lionesses**	**0-5**	**Thitsar Arman**	TF-1 Stadium, Yangon
15:30 UTC+06:30			Myat Noe Khin 34', 45+3', 62'; Chit Su Wai 41'; Win Win 45'

26 January 2026	**ISPE**	**2-2**	**Yangon United**	Padonmar Stadium, Yangon
15:30 UTC+06:30	Shwe Ye Tun 15'; Su Pyae Pyae Kyaw 27'		Zin Moe Pyae 11', 81'

27 January 2026	**Ayeyawady**	**3-2**	**Shan United**	TF-1, Yangon
15:30 UTC+06:30	Phyu Phyu Win 3'; San Thaw Thaw 34'; Alyssa Ube 89'		Nang Bayae 18'; Sandar Aung 81'

Week 18

30 January 2026	**Myawady**	**1-2**	**Yangon United**	University Stadium, Yangon
15:30 UTC+06:30	Pont Pont Pyae Maung 2'		Yoon Wadi Hlaing 7'; Zin Moe Pyae 35' (pen.)

30 January 2026	**Yangon City**	**0-2**	**Young Lionesses**	TF-1 Stadium, Yangon
15:30 UTC+06:30			Min Htone May Zitar 48'; Shin Thant Phyu Sin Pyone 65'

31 January 2026	**Thitsar Arman**	**0-0**	**Shan United**	TF-1 Stadium, Yangon
15:30 UTC+06:30

31 January 2026	**ISPE**	**0-0**	**Ayeyawady**	Thuwunna Stadium, Yangon
15:30 UTC+06:30

== Top scorers ==
As of 31 January 2026

Rank	Player	Club	Goals
1	(Myanmar) Zin Moe Pyae	Yangon United W.F.C	22
2	(Myanmar) Myat Noe Khin	Thitsar Arman	20
2	(Myanmar) San Thaw Thaw	Ayeyawady W.F.C	20
3	(Myanmar) Shwe Yee Tun	I.S.P.E F.C.	16
4	(Myanmar) Phyu Phyu Win	Ayeyawady W.F.C	11
5	(Myanmar) Yoon Wadi Hlaing	Yangon United W.F.C	7
6	(Myanmar) Win Win	Thitsar Arman	6
7	(Myanmar) Lin Myint Mo	I.S.P.E F.C.	5
7	(Myanmar) Nant Phyu Phyu Thwe	Shan United W.F.C	5
7	(Myanmar) Khaing Thazin	Shan United W.F.C	5

=== Clean sheets ===
As of 31 January 2026

Rank	Player	Club	Clean sheets
1	(Myanmar) Ei Sandar Zaw	Ayeyawady	9
2	(Myanmar) Myo Mya Mya Nyein	Thitsar Arman	5
2	(Myanmar) May Zin Nwe	Shan United W.F.C	5
2	(Myanmar) Zue Latt Nadi	ISPE	5
2	(Myanmar) Htet Eaindra Lin	ISPE	5
2	(Myanmar) Phee Bay	Yangon United W.F.C	5
3	(Myanmar) Hla Hla Htwe	YREO	4
3	(Myanmar) Thu Zar Aung	Thitsar Arman	4
4	(Myanmar) Khine Zar Win	Shan United W.F.C	3
5	(Myanmar) Saung Pwint Phyu	Young Lionesses	2
6	(Myanmar) Ei Tar Yar	Myawady W.F.C.	1
6	(Myanmar) Amie Khaing	Yangon City W.F.C	1

=== Hat-tricks ===
Player	For	Against	Result	Date
(Myanmar) Myat Noe Khin	Thitsar Arman	Young Lionesses	4-0	24 April 2025
(Myanmar) Myat Noe Khin	Thitsar Arman	Yangon City	5-0	27 April 2025
(Myanmar) San Thaw Thaw	Ayeyawady	YREO	6-0	28 April 2025
(Myanmar) Shwe Yee Tun	I.S.P.E F.C.	Ayeyawady	3-3	2 May 2025
(Myanmar) Zin Moe Pyae	Yangon United	Young Lionesses	8-0	6 May 2025
(Myanmar) Khaing Thazin	Shan United	Myawady	5-0	11 September 2025
(Myanmar) Zin Moe Pyae	Yangon United	YERO	4-1	17 September 2025
(Myanmar) San Thaw Thaw	Ayeyawady	Young Lionesses	4-0	18 September 2025
(Myanmar) Ei Thet Phyo	YREO	Young Lionesses	6-1	30 September 2025
(Myanmar) Win Sandar	YREO	Young Lionesses	6-1	30 September 2025
(Myanmar) Win Win	Thitsar Arman	Yangon City	3-1	3 January 2026
(Myanmar) Lin Myint Mo	I.S.P.E F.C.	Yangon City	6-0	7 January 2026
(Myanmar) Shwe Ye Tun	I.S.P.E F.C.	Young Lionesses	9-0	11 January 2026
(Myanmar) Zin Moe Pyae	Yangon United	YERO	3-1	23 January 2026
(Myanmar) Myat Noe Khin	Thitsar Arman	Young Lionesses	5-0	26 January 2026

== Player statistics ==
- Youngest player: Nant Shin That Phyu Sin Pyone (Ayeyawady) — 15 years
- Oldest player: Khin Marlar Tun (ISPE W.F.C) — 36 years
- Youngest scorer: Nant Shin That Phyu Sin Pyone (Ayeyawady) — 15 years (28 April 2025, Ayeyawady 6-0 YREO)
- Oldest scorer: Khin Marlar Tun (ISPE W.F.C) — 36 years 3 months 5 days (26 December 2025, ISPE 3-0 Myawady)
- Fastest scorer: San Thaw Thaw ( Ayeyawady W.F.C) — 25 seconds (14 January 2026, Ayeyawady W.F.C - Myawady W.F.C.)
  Phyu Phyu Win ( Ayeyawady W.F.C) — 22 seconds (22 January 2026, Ayeyawady W.F.C - Young Lionesses W.F.C)
- Most consecutive matches scored:
- Longest clean sheet: Myo Mya Mya Nyein (600 minutes)
- Most goals in a season: 22 — Zin Moe Pyae (Yangon United W.F.C )

=== Annual awards ===
Award	Winner	Club
Myanmar Women League Manager of the Season	(Myanmar) Aung Kyaw Zan	Ayeyawady
Myanmar Women League Player of the Season	(Myanmar) Phyu Phyu Win	Ayeyawady
Myanmar Women League Playermaker of the Season	(Myanmar) Phyu Phyu Win	Ayeyawady
Myanmar Women League Young Player of the Season		
Myanmar Women League Transfer of the Season	(Myanmar) Phyu Phyu Win	Ayeyawady
Myanmar Women League Save of the Season	(Myanmar)	

Women League Team of the Season
Goalkeeper	(Myanmar) Ei Sandar Zaw (Ayeyawady)			
Defenders	(Myanmar) Lin Lae Oo (ISPE)	(Myanmar) Zune Yu Ya Oo (Ayeyawady)	(Myanmar) May Thet Mon Myint (Thitsar Arman)	(Myanmar) Khin Moe Win (Ayeyawady)
Midfielders	(Myanmar) Yoon Wadi Hlaing (Yangon United)		(Myanmar) Phyu Phyu Win (Ayeyawady)	(Myanmar) Shwe Yee Tun (ISPE)
Forwards	(Myanmar) Myat Noe Khin (Thitsar Arman)		(Myanmar) Zin Moe Pyae (Yangon United)	(Myanmar) San Thaw Thaw (Ayeyawady)

== See also ==
- 2025–26 Myanmar National League
- Myanmar National League Cup
- 2026 AYA Bank Tri Nation Cup
- 2025–26 MNL-2
- 2025 MNL League Cup
