= Hong Kong Women's League =

- Founded: 2012
- Country: Hong Kong
- Confederation: AFC
- Divisions: 3
- Number of clubs: 25 (current season)
- Domestic cup: FA Cup
- International cup: AFC Women's Champions League
- Current champions: TSL (1st title) (2025–26)
- Most championships: Citizen AA (6 titles)
- Top scorer: Cheung Wai Ki (117 goals)
- Website: http://www.hkfa.com/en/
- Current: 2026–27 Hong Kong Women's League

The Hong Kong Women's League (Chinese: 香港女子聯賽) (currently known as the Jockey Club Women's Football League for sponsorship reasons), is a Hong Kong football league for women's association football clubs consisting of three divisions. It was originally established in 1986 by the Hong Kong Ladies Football Association, but was re-formed and is now organised by the Hong Kong Football Association. It does not affiliate to any women football leagues in the rest of China.

Citizen holds the record for the most titles won, with six. The current 2025–2026 Hong Kong Women's League champions is TSL FC.

== History ==
Established in 1986 by the Hong Kong Ladies Football Association, the first season was competed by 6 teams, with Caroline Hill Women winning the title. However, since the association is not well-structured, the league was organised badly.

In 2009, after Hong Kong won the gold medal in the 2009 East Asian Games, the Hong Kong government announced and introduced the Project Phoenix which suggested that the Hong Kong Football Association should introduce a new and structured women league.

In 2012, the HKFA introduced the new Hong Kong Women's League with 10 teams competing for the league title.

In 2018, the HKFA introduced the two-tier system for the Hong Kong Women's League, with 8 teams competing in the First Division and 6–7 teams competing in the Second Division. From 2023, the third tier was introduced with 8 teams as the Third Division.

== Format and Clubs ==
=== Format and Clubs ===
The league consists of three divisions, with the following clubs competing in the 2026-27 season.

First Division	Second Division	Third Division
TSL FC; Kitchee; Jianlibao FC; Shatin; United Citizen; WSE; HKFC	Hoi King; On Fire; Hong Kong Ladies Football Association; Eastern District; Best Union Yuen Long; Tuen Mun; Tai Po; Kwoon Chung Southern	BC Rangers; Eastern; Chandler Lambert; Sham Shui Po; Guardian; Yau Tsim Mong; Lucky Mile; Kowloon Cricket Club; Kwun Tong; HKWFC

=== First Division ===
In the 2026–27 season, seven clubs compete in a two-stage format. The first stage consists of a double round-robin where each team plays 12 matches. Teams then split into two single round-robin groups based on their standings: the top four contest the Championship Group for the league title, while the bottom three enter the Challenging Group, from which the last-placed team is relegated to the Second Division.

Each club is allowed to name 4 foreign players on the team-sheet, with 2 foreign players on the pitch at any time. However, Hong Kong FC are the only team which can name more than 3 foreign players on the pitch as they are formed by foreign players.

=== Second Division ===
Eight clubs compete in a standard double round-robin tournament of 14 matches each. The league champion is promoted to the First Division, while the bottom-placed club is relegated to the Third Division.

=== Third Division ===
Ten clubs compete in a two-stage format. Following an 18-match double round-robin in the first stage, the league splits into two single round-robin groups of five. The top five teams contest the Championship Group for the division title and promotion, while the bottom five enter the Challenging Group, with the tenth-placed team eliminated from the league system.

== Champions ==
=== First Division ===
- 2012–13: Citizen
- 2013–14: Citizen
- 2014–15: Citizen
- 2015–16: Citizen
- 2016–17: Citizen
- 2017–18: Kitchee
- 2018–19: Happy Valley
- 2019–20: Abandoned due to COVID-19 pandemic in Hong Kong
- 2020–21: Citizen
- 2021–22: Abandoned due to COVID-19 pandemic in Hong Kong
- 2022–23: Kitchee
- 2023–24: Kitchee
- 2024–25: Kitchee
- 2025–26: TSL

=== Second Division ===
- 2018–19: Standard Perpetual MLFA
- 2019–20: Abandoned due to COVID-19 pandemic in Hong Kong
- 2020–21: HKWFC
- 2021–22: Abandoned due to COVID-19 pandemic in Hong Kong
- 2022–23: Soar FC
- 2023–24: Tuen Mun
- 2024–25: Wong Tai Sin
- 2025–26: BC Rangers

=== Third Division ===
- 2023–24: Harmony Eagle
- 2024–25: Hong Kong Ladies Football Association
- 2025–26: Eastern District

== See also ==
- Hong Kong Premier League
