= TSL FC =

Hong Kong-based football team

TSL
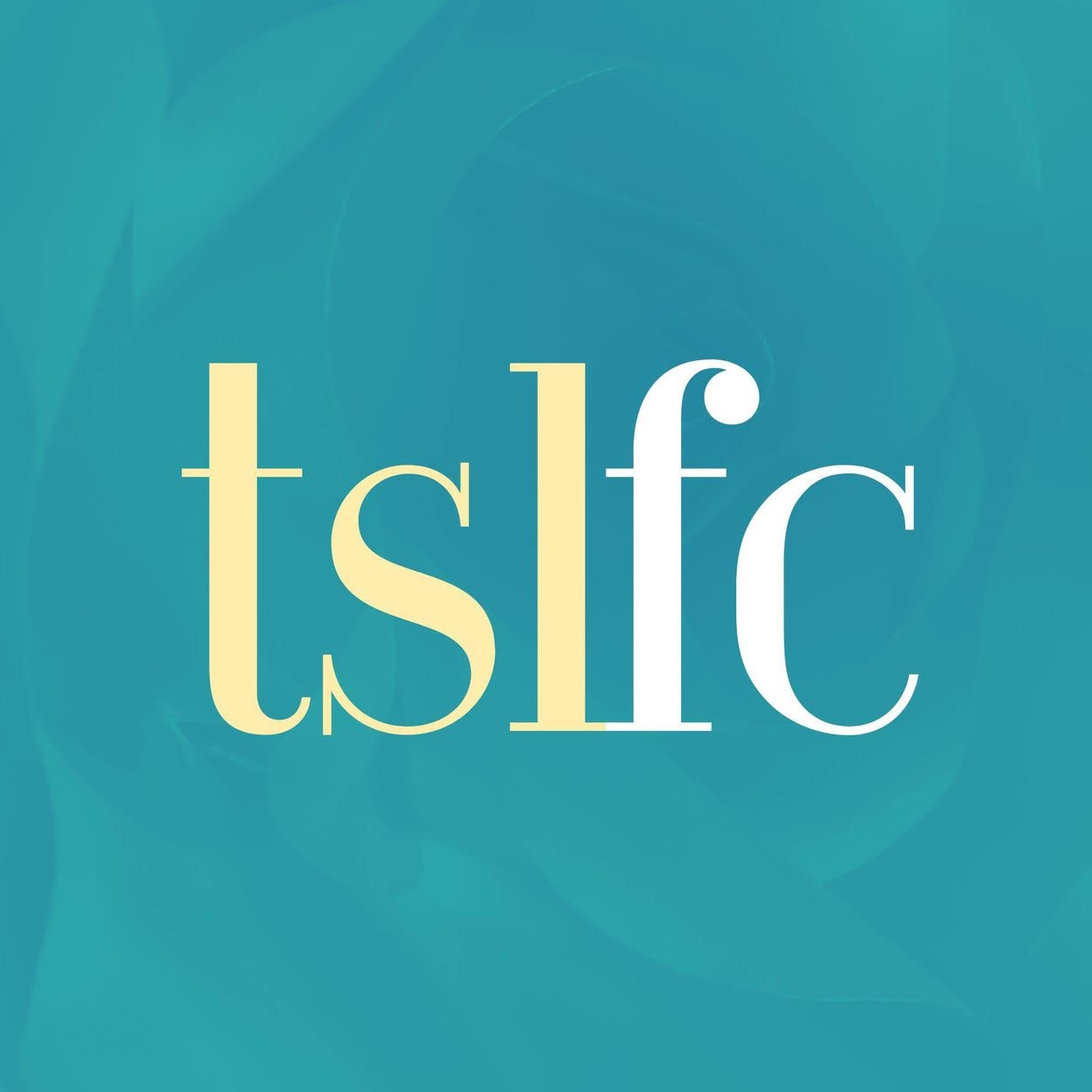
- Club logo (Note: The club primarily uses the TSL FC logo on its website and social media, while the TSL Foundation logo is used on its kits and in official competition materials.)
- Full name: Tan Siu Lin Football Club
- Founded: 2009
- Head coach: Čedomir Mijanović
- League: Hong Kong Women's League
- 2025–26: Champions

TSL FC
- Traditional Chinese: 仁足社
- Simplified Chinese: 仁足社
- Literal meaning: Benevolent Football Society
Transcriptions
Standard Mandarin
- Hanyu Pinyin: Rén Zú Shè

Alternative Chinese name
- Traditional Chinese: 车路士足球学校（香港）
- Simplified Chinese: 車路士足球學校（香港）
- Literal meaning: Chelsea Football School (Hong Kong)
Transcriptions
Standard Mandarin
- Hanyu Pinyin: Chēlùshì Zúqiú Xuéxiào (Xiānggǎng)

TSL FC (Chinese: 仁足社) is a women's football club from Hong Kong which currently competes in the Hong Kong Women's League. It was established in 2009 as the women's team of the Chelsea FC Soccer School Hong Kong.

== History ==
=== Early years ===
TSL FC is a club and flagship team of the Tan Siu Lin (TSL) Foundation. The foundation itself was established in 2007 by twin brothers Raymond and Jerry Tan. It was named after their father, Tan Siu Lin who is the founder of the Luen Thai Group.

In 2009, the TSL Foundation established the Chelsea FC Soccer School Hong Kong, the first football academy of the English Premier League club Chelsea in Asia. The organization renamed as the Tan Siu Lin (TSL) Football Foundation in 2019.

=== As Chelsea School ===
The foundation's women's football team previously competed under the name "Chelsea FC Soccer School" in the Hong Kong Women's League.

Chelsea finished as runners-up in the 2022–23 and the 2023–24 season. They also won the FA Cup for the latter season.

=== Transition to TSL ===
The Hong Kong Chelsea women's team changed their name to TSL FC for the 2024–26 season which started in September.The academy itself became AC Milan Football Academy Hong Kon after the 2009 deal expired in March 30, 2025. They finished as runners-up in both the league and FA Cup in their first season as TSL.

On 9 May 2026, TSL became the 2025–26 domestic season champions, and qualified to represent Hong Kong in the preliminary stage of the 2026–27 AFC Women's Champions League. They followed this feat by winning the FA Cup, defeating Kitchee 3–0 in the final on 14 June 2026. At the preliminaries of the Champions League in Bishkek, TSL tied with Philippine club Kaya–Iloilo in the table standings but failed to advance to the group stage on goal differences. Both clubs were undefeated, only drawing against each other.

== Other teams ==
TSL has a seven-a-side football team, which played in the Hong Kong Soccer Sevens in 2024.

== Record ==
=== Main domestic competitions ===
| Season | League | FA Cup |
|---|---|---|
| 2022–23 | Runners-up | Runners-up |
| 2023–24 | Runners-up | Champion |
| 2024–25 | Runners-up | Runners-up |
| 2025–26 | Champion | Champion |
| 2026–27 | TBD | TBD |

=== AFC Women's Champions League ===
As of 23 August 2026

All results (away, home and aggregate) list TSL's goal tally first.

| Competition | Pld | W | D | L | GF | GA | GD |
|---|---|---|---|---|---|---|---|
| AFC Champions League | 3 | 2 | 1 | 0 | 6 | 0 | +6 |
| Total | 3 | 2 | 1 | 0 | 6 | 0 | +6 |

| Season | Round | Opponents | Result | Agg. / Pos. |
|---|---|---|---|---|
| 2026–27 | Preliminary stage | (Cambodia) Phnom Penh Crown | 2–0 | Group B (2nd) |
| 2026–27 | Preliminary stage | (Kyrgyzstan) Ilbirs | 4–0 | Group B (2nd) |
| 2026–27 | Preliminary stage | (Philippines) Kaya–Iloilo | 0–0 | Group B (2nd) |

== Affiliate clubs ==
- (Philippines) Tuloy

== Head coaches ==
- (Montenegro) Čedomir Mijanović (2025–)
