= Kang Sun-mi =

South Korean footballer (born 1979)

Personal information
- Full name: Kang Sun-mi
- Date of birth: 14 March 1979 (age 47)
- Height: 1.66 m (5 ft 5 in)
- Position: Forward

Youth career
- 1995-1997: Dongho Technical High School
- 1998-1999: Hanyang Women's University

Senior career*
Years	Team	Apps	(Gls)
2000-2002	Soongmin Wonders		
2002-2003	INI Steel		
2004-2009	Seoul WFC		
2010-2013	Icheon Daekyo		

International career
1997-2010	South Korea	37	(10)

Managerial career
- 2017-2020: Gangwon State University (coach)
- 2020-2024: Hwacheon KSPO (coach)
- 2025-: Hwacheon KSPO
- * Club domestic league appearances and goals

Kang Sun-mi (Korean: 강선미, born 14 March 1979) is a South Korean former football player and coach who is currently the manager of Hwacheon KSPO WFC.

== Club career ==
When women's works football team Soongmin Wonders was founded in late 1999, Kang was one of its original squad members, playing as a striker. She quickly earned a reputation as one of the club's top goalscorers. Kang played for Soongmin until the team's disbandment in late 2002, after which she moved to INI Steel. She moved again in 2004, joining the newly established Seoul City WFC. Kang later played for Goyang Daekyo in the WK League before retiring from her playing career.

== International career ==
Kang was part of the South Korean squad that won the bronze medal at the 2001 Summer Universiade in Beijing. She scored the opening goal in the third-place playoff against France. Kang scored her team's only goal in a 3-1 loss against Australia in the group stage of the 2010 AFC Women's Asian Cup, in what would be her penultimate international appearance.

== Managerial career ==
Having previously coached the women's football team at Gangwon State University, from 2020 to 2024 Kang worked as a coach for WK League side Hwacheon KSPO. She was promoted to manager in 2025 after Kang Jae-soon stepped aside to take on a more general managerial role at the club. In her first year as head coach, Kang led KSPO to their first WK League championship title, completing the first domestic treble in the history of Korean women's football following wins at the National Women's Football Championship and National Sports Festival. She also received the Korean Women's Football Federation Manager of the Year award.

== Style of play ==
From a young age Kang was known for her speed and physical strength despite her slight build. Her goalscoring ability earned her comparisons to legendary Chinese footballer Sun Wen.

== Career statistics ==
=== International ===
As of match played 23 May 2010

Appearances and goals by national team and year
National team	Year	Apps	Goals
South Korea	1997	2	0
South Korea	1998	3	0
South Korea	1999	9	5
South Korea	2000	4	0
South Korea	2001	7	3
South Korea	2002	3	0
South Korea	2006	4	0
South Korea	2007	1	0
South Korea	2010	3	1
Total		37	10

Scores and results list South Korea's goal tally first, score column indicates score after each Kang Sun-mi goal.

List of international goals scored by Kang Sun-mi
No.	Date	Venue	Opponent	Score	Result	Competition	Ref.
1	7 November 1999	Panaad Stadium, Bacolod, Philippines	China	1-1	2-5	1999 AFC Women's Championship	
2	7 November 1999	Panaad Stadium, Bacolod, Philippines	China	2-5	2-5	1999 AFC Women's Championship	
3	9 November 1999	Panaad Stadium, Bacolod, Philippines	Kazakhstan	2-0	6-0	1999 AFC Women's Championship	
4	15 November 1999	Panaad Stadium, Bacolod, Philippines	Guam		11-0	1999 AFC Women's Championship	
5	15 November 1999	Panaad Stadium, Bacolod, Philippines	Guam		11-0	1999 AFC Women's Championship	
6	3 August 2001	Munsu World Cup Stadium, Ulsan, South Korea	Japan	1-0	1-1	Toto Cup International Women's Football Tournament	
7	5 August 2001	Gangneung Stadium, Gangneung, South Korea	Brazil	3-1	3-1	Toto Cup International Women's Football Tournament	
8	4 December 2001	New Taipei City, Taiwan	India	4-0	7-0	2001 AFC Women's Championship	
9	8 December 2001	New Taipei City, Taiwan	Malaysia		3-0	2001 AFC Women's Championship	
10	21 May 2010	Chengdu Sports Center, Chengdu, China	Australia	1-3	1-3	2010 AFC Women's Asian Cup	

== Honours ==
=== Player ===
==== Hanyang Women's University ====
- Korean women's football league: 1998

==== Individual ====
- Korean women's football league MVP: 1998

=== Manager ===
==== Hwacheon KSPO ====
- WK League: 2025
- National Women's Football Championship: 2025
- National Sports Festival: 2025

==== Individual ====
- KWFF Manager of the year: 2025
