= 2024 WK League =

Korean association football league

WK League
- Season: 2024
- Dates: 16 March – 26 September 2024
- Champions: Suwon FC (2nd title)
- Champions League: Suwon FC
- Matches: 112
- Goals: 285 (2.54 per match)
- Top goalscorer: Mai Kyokawa (22 goals)
- Biggest home win: Gyeongju 5–0 Changnyeong
- Biggest away win: Changnyeong 0–4 Hwacheon
- Highest scoring: Seoul 5–6 Suwon
- Average attendance: 261
- (Note: All statistics do not include play-off matches)

The 2024 WK League, also known as the 2024 Develon WK League for sponsorship purposes, was the 16th season of the WK League, the top division of women's football in South Korea. The regular season consisted of 28 rounds and was held from 16 March to 26 September 2024, and the play-offs from 2 to 9 November 2024.

Incheon Hyundai Steel Red Angels, the defending champions since 2014, failed to achieve their twelfth consecutive title. Suwon FC won the championship for their second title and first since 2010 after defeating Hwacheon KSPO 3–2 over two legs in the final, ending the previous holders Incheon Hyundai Steel Red Angels' streak of eleven consecutive titles.

== Teams ==
=== Stadiums and locations ===
Locations of the 2024 WK League teams

The following eight teams competed in the 2024 WK League.

Team	Location	Stadium	Capacity	Position in 2023
Changnyeong WFC	Changnyeong	Changnyeong Sports Park	2,500	8th
Gyeongju KHNP	Gyeongju	Gyeongju Football Park	650	4th
Hwacheon KSPO	Hwacheon	Hwacheon Stadium	3,000	3rd
Incheon Hyundai Steel Red Angels	Incheon	Incheon Namdong Asiad Rugby Field	5,078	1st
Mungyeong Sangmu	Mungyeong	Mungyeong Civic Stadium	9,000	6th
Sejong Sportstoto	Sejong	Sejong Central Park	1,000	5th
Seoul City	Seoul	Seoul World Cup Auxiliary Stadium	1,012	7th
Suwon FC	Suwon	Suwon Sports Complex	11,808	2nd

=== Foreign players ===
The total number of foreign players was restricted to three per club, including a slot for a player from the Asian Football Confederation countries. As a military team, Mungyeong Sangmu were not allowed to sign any foreign players.

Club	Player 1	Player 2	AFC player
Changnyeong WFC	(Japan) Fumina Katsurama		(Japan) Misuzu Uchida
Gyeongju KHNP	(Brazil) Bruna Pelé	(Japan) Mai Kyokawa	(Japan) Sae Kitakata
Hwacheon KSPO			(Japan) Asuna Tanaka
Incheon Hyundai Steel Red Angels	(Kenya) Tereza Engesha	(Ivory Coast) Ines Nrehy	(Japan) Yoko Tanaka
Sejong Sportstoto			(Japan) Mizuka Sato
Seoul City			
Suwon FC	(Ivory Coast) Josée Nahi		(Japan) Ayaka Nishikawa

== Regular season ==
=== League table ===
Pos	Team	Pld	W	D	L	GF	GA	GD	Pts	Qualification
1	Hwacheon KSPO	28	16	8	4	49	27	+22	56	Qualification for Championship
2	Suwon FC	28	15	8	5	47	31	+16	53	Qualification for Play-off
3	Gyeongju KHNP	28	14	9	5	54	36	+18	51	Qualification for Play-off
4	Incheon Hyundai Steel Red Angels	28	12	11	5	36	25	+11	47	
5	Sejong Sportstoto	28	9	11	8	31	30	+1	38	
6	Seoul City	28	6	9	13	33	44	−11	27	
7	Mungyeong Sangmu	28	4	7	17	24	45	−21	19	
8	Changnyeong WFC	28	2	5	21	11	47	−36	11	

Source: Soccerway

== Results ==
=== Matches 1–14 ===
Home \ Away	CHA	GYE	HWA	INC	MUN	SEJ	SEO	SUW
Changnyeong WFC	—	0–1	1–2	0–1	1–0	0–1	1–2	2–2
Gyeongju KHNP	2–0	—	0–0	1–2	2–2	1–1	1–1	3–0
Hwacheon KSPO	2–0	2–1	—	2–4	3–0	1–1	3–0	1–0
Incheon Hyundai Steel	1–0	1–1	2–2	—	0–0	2–1	2–0	3–2
Mungyeong Sangmu	2–1	1–2	0–2	0–0	—	0–0	0–3	2–3
Sejong Sportstoto	4–0	1–2	2–1	0–0	3–2	—	2–1	0–2
Seoul City	0–0	1–3	1–1	1–2	0–0	2–2	—	1–1
Suwon FC	3–0	3–2	0–1	1–1	1–0	0–0	4–1	—

Source: Soccerway
Legend: Blue = home team win; Yellow = draw; Red = away team win.

=== Matches 15–28 ===
Home \ Away	CHA	GYE	HWA	INC	MUN	SEJ	SEO	SUW
Changnyeong WFC	—	1–2	0–4	0–2	0–1	0–1	1–1	0–2
Gyeongju KHNP	5–0	—	1–1	0–0	2–1	3–2	4–3	2–0
Hwacheon KSPO	1–2	4–2	—	2–1	2–0	1–0	2–0	1–1
Incheon Hyundai Steel	0–0	3–4	2–0	—	3–2	0–0	0–1	0–1
Mungyeong Sangmu	2–1	2–2	1–2	1–2	—	0–1	1–0	1–1
Sejong Sportstoto	0–0	1–3	1–1	1–1	4–2	—	0–0	1–2
Seoul City	2–0	2–2	1–2	1–0	3–1	0–1	—	5–6
Suwon FC	1–0	1–0	3–3	1–1	1–0	3–0	2–0	—

Source: Soccerway
Legend: Blue = home team win; Yellow = draw; Red = away team win.

== Championship play-offs ==
The semi-final and finals were officially named "Play-off" and "Championship", respectively.

=== Bracket ===
Play-off (Semi-final)			Championship (Finals)
			1	Hwacheon KSPO	0	2	2
2	Suwon FC (p)	1 (5)		Suwon FC	2	1	3
3	Gyeongju KHNP	1 (4)

=== Play-off ===
2 November 2024
14:00 UTC+9

Suwon FC	1–1 (a.e.t.)	Gyeongju KHNP
Kim Yun-ji 60'		Jang Sel-gi 35'
Penalties
(penalty scored) Seo Ye-jin; (penalty scored) Nishikawa; (penalty scored) Lee Young-seo; (penalty scored) Kang Chae-rim; (penalty scored) Moon Mi-ra	5–4	(penalty missed) Jang Sel-gi; (penalty scored) Kyokawa; (penalty scored) Kitakata; (penalty scored) Pelé; (penalty scored) Kim Hye-ji

Suwon Stadium, Suwon

=== Championship ===
5 November 2024
18:00 UTC+9

Suwon FC	2–0	Hwacheon KSPO

Suwon Stadium, Suwon

9 November 2024
14:00 UTC+9

Hwacheon KSPO	2–1	Suwon FC

Hwacheon Sports Park, Hwacheon

Suwon FC won 3–2 on aggregate.

=== Final table ===
Pos	Team	Qualification
1	Suwon FC (C)	Qualification for Champions League
2	Hwacheon KSPO	
3	Gyeongju KHNP	

Source: Soccerway
(C) Champions
