= 2026–27 AFC Women's Champions League =

Tournament details
- Dates: 17 August 2026 – 22 May 2027
- Teams: 30 (from 29 associations)

Tournament statistics
- Matches played: 54
- Goals scored: 285 (5.28 per match)
- Attendance: 27,515 (510 per match)
- All statistics correct as of 7 November 2026.

The 2026–27 AFC Women's Champions League is the third edition of the AFC Women's Champions League, Asia's premier club women's football tournament organized by the Asian Football Confederation (AFC).

The winners will qualify for the 2027–28 AFC Women's Champions League if they have not already qualified through their domestic performance, and the 2028 FIFA Women's Club World Cup.

Naegohyang are the defending champions.

== Association team allocation ==
The defending champions enter directly to the group stage without taking from their member association team allocation, if not already qualified through their domestic performance. Aside from that, there is only one entry per participating member association, with allocation based on AFC Women's Club ranking made with 70% of AFC club points and 30% of national team points as per FIFA Women's World Ranking. The defending champions and teams from the top five ranked associations qualify directly to the group stage, with the remaining teams starting from the preliminary stage.

Rank	Member association	Points	Slots	
Rank	Member association	Points	Group stage	Play-in qualifier
1	Australia	97.662	1	0
2	South Korea	75.852	1	0
3	Japan	74.800	1	0
4	China	74.583	1	0
5	Vietnam	70.393	1	0
6	United Arab Emirates	50.763	0	1
7	Iran	50.389	0	1
8	Chinese Taipei	48.149	0	1
9	Philippines	37.175	0	1
10	Thailand	33.771	0	1
11	India	30.737	0	1
12	Malaysia	30.443	0	1
13	North Korea	29.136	0 (+1 AWCL)	1
14	Uzbekistan	24.634	0	1
15	Myanmar	23.653	0	1
16	Jordan	22.008	0	1
17	Hong Kong	21.376	0	1
18	Laos	19.960	0	1
22	Guam	18.077	0	1
23	Singapore	17.618	0	1
24	Cambodia	17.245	0	1
25	Mongolia	16.541	0	1
26	Saudi Arabia	16.425	0	1
27	Lebanon	16.421	0	1
28	Bangladesh	16.362	0	1
29	Kyrgyzstan	16.343	0	1
32	Tajikistan	14.640	0	1
33	Bhutan	14.382	0	1
36	Timor-Leste	14.211	0	1
Total	Participating associations: 29		6	24
Total	Participating associations: 29		30	

Associations that did not enter a team:

- Afghanistan
- Bahrain
- Brunei
- Indonesia
- Iraq
- Kuwait
- Macau
- Maldives
- Nepal
- Northern Mariana Islands
- Oman
- Pakistan
- Palestine
- Qatar
- Sri Lanka
- Syria
- Turkmenistan
- Yemen

== Format ==
The competition comprises:

- a preliminary stage in centralised venues (number of groups depends on number of total teams).
- a group stage with 12 teams (three groups of four teams) in centralised venues.
- quarter-finals hosted by the group winners and the best second-placed team.
- semi-finals and final in a centralised venue.

=== Tiebreakers ===
Teams in the preliminary stage and the group stage are ranked according to points (3 points for a win, 1 point for a draw, 0 points for a loss). If two or more teams are tied on points, the following tiebreaking criteria are applied, in the order given, to determine the rankings:

1. Points in head-to-head matches among the tied teams;
2. Goal difference in head-to-head matches among the tied teams;
3. Goals scored in head-to-head matches among the tied teams;
4. If more than two teams are tied, and after applying all head-to-head criteria above, a subset of teams are still tied, all head-to-head criteria above are reapplied exclusively to this subset of teams;
5. Goal difference in all group matches;
6. Goals scored in all group matches;
7. Penalty shoot-out, if only two teams are tied, and the teams in question have played their last group match against each other;
8. Lower disciplinary score (direct red card = 3 points; double yellow card = 3 points; single yellow card = 1 point);
9. Drawing of lots.

== Schedule ==
Stage	Round	Draw date	Dates
Preliminary stage	Matchday 1	2 July 2026	17 August 2026
Preliminary stage	Matchday 2	2 July 2026	20 August 2026
Preliminary stage	Matchday 3	2 July 2026	23 August 2026
Group stage	Matchday 1	3 September 2026	1–7 November 2026
Group stage	Matchday 2	3 September 2026	1–7 November 2026
Group stage	Matchday 3	3 September 2026	1–7 November 2026
Knockout stage	Quarter-finals	14 January 2027	27–28 March 2027
Knockout stage	Semi-finals	14 January 2027	19 May 2027
Knockout stage	Final	14 January 2027	22 May 2027

== Teams ==
=== Team locations ===
Location of the 2026–27 AFC Women's Champions League teams
Red: Group stage; Yellow: Preliminary stage

=== Entrants ===
Group stage direct entrants
Team	Qualifying method	App. (last)
(North Korea) Naegohyang	2025–26 AFC Women's Champions League champions	2nd (2025–26)
(Australia) Melbourne City	2025–26 A-League Women premiers	3rd (2025–26)
(South Korea) Hwacheon KSPO	2025 WK League champions	1st
(Japan) Kobe Leonessa	2025–26 WE League champions	1st
(China) Beijing Jingtan	2025 Chinese Women's Super League champions	1st
(Vietnam) Hồ Chí Minh City	2025 Vietnamese Women's National League champions	3rd (2025–26)

Preliminary stage participants
Team	Qualifying method	App. (last)
(Chinese Taipei) New Taipei City Hang Yuan	2025–26 Taiwan Mulan Football League champions	1st
(Philippines) Kaya–Iloilo	2025 PFF Women's League champions	2nd (2024–25)
(Thailand) College of Asian Scholars	2026 Thai Women's League 1 champions	3rd (2025–26)
(India) East Bengal	2025–26 Indian Women's League champions	2nd (2025–26)
(Malaysia) Sabah	2025 Malaysia National Women's League champions	2nd (2024–25)
(North Korea) April 25	2024–25 DPR Korea Women's Premier League champions	1st
(Uzbekistan) Nasaf	2025 Uzbekistan Women's League champions	3rd (2025–26)
(Iran) Bam Khatoon	2025–26 Kowsar Women's Pro League champions	3rd (2025–26)
(Myanmar) Ayeyawady	2025–26 Myanmar Women's League champions	1st
(Jordan) Etihad	2025–26 Jordan Women's Pro League champions	3rd (2025–26)
(Hong Kong) TSL	2025–26 Hong Kong Women's League champions	1st
(Laos) Master	2025 Lao Women's League champions	2nd (2025–26)
(Guam) Rovers	2026 Women's G League champions	1st
(Singapore) FC Jurong	2025 Women's Premier League champions	1st
(Cambodia) Phnom Penh Crown	2025 Cambodian Women's League champions	2nd (2025–26)
(Mongolia) Kharaatsai	2026 Women's National Football League champions	1st
(Saudi Arabia) Al-Nassr	2025–26 Saudi Women's Premier League champions	3rd (2025–26)
(Kyrgyzstan) Ilbirs Bishkek	2025 Kyrgyzstan Women's League champions	1st
(Bhutan) Royal Thimphu College	2025 Women's National League champions	3rd (2025–26)
(United Arab Emirates) Banaat	2025–26 UAE Women's Football League champions	1st
(Bangladesh) Rajshahi Stars	2025–26 Bangladesh Women's Football League champions	1st
(Timor-Leste) S'Amuser	2025–26 Timorese Women's Football League champions	1st
(Tajikistan) CSKA Dushanbe	2026 Tajikistan Women's Football League champions	1st
(Lebanon) No Limits	2025–26 Lebanese Women's Football League champions	1st

== Preliminary stage ==
The draw was held on 2 July 2026 at the AFC House in Kuala Lumpur, Malaysia.

=== Seedings ===
Pot 1	Pot 2	Pot 3	Pot 4
1. (Thailand) College of Asian Scholars (H); 2. (United Arab Emirates) Banaat; 3. (Iran) Bam Khatoon; 4. (Chinese Taipei) New Taipei Hang Yuan; 5. (Philippines) Kaya–Iloilo; 6. (India) East Bengal	7. (Malaysia) Sabah (H); 8. (Uzbekistan) Nasaf (H); 9. (Myanmar) Ayeyawady (H); 10. (North Korea) April 25; 11. (Jordan) Etihad; 12. (Hong Kong) TSL	13. (Laos) Master; 14. (Guam) Rovers; 15. (Singapore) FC Jurong; 16. (Cambodia) Phnom Penh Crown; 17. (Mongolia) Kharaatsai; 18. (Saudi Arabia) Al Nassr	19. (Kyrgyzstan) Ilbirs (H); 20. (Tajikistan) CSKA Dushanbe (H); 21. (Lebanon) No Limits; 22. (Bangladesh) Rajshahi Stars; 23. (Bhutan) Royal Thimphu College; 24. (Timor-Leste) S'Amuser

=== Group A ===
- All matches were held in Malaysia.
- Times listed are UTC+8.

Pos	Team	Pld	W	D	L	GF	GA	GD	Pts	Qualification
1	(India) East Bengal	3	3	0	0	18	0	+18	9	Advance to group stage
2	(Malaysia) Sabah (H)	3	2	0	1	15	3	+12	6	
3	(Bangladesh) Rajshahi Stars	3	1	0	2	9	6	+3	3	
4	(Guam) Rovers	3	0	0	3	0	33	−33	0	

Source: AFC
Rules for classification: Tiebreakers
(H) Hosts
17 August 2026
16:00 UTC+8

East Bengal (India)	4–0	(Bangladesh) Rajshahi Stars
Anokye 9' (pen.), 38'; Oraon 26'; Guguloth 71'	Report

Likas Stadium, Kota Kinabalu
Attendance: 80
Referee: Mu Mingxin (China)
17 August 2026
20:00 UTC+8

Sabah (Malaysia)	13–0	(Guam) Rovers
Terawaki 11', 70', 90+2'; Atis 24', 34', 45+3', 66', 80'; Broussard 39', 51', 58', 62'; An Se-bin 83'	Report

Likas Stadium, Kota Kinabalu
Attendance: 324
Referee: Sunita Thongthawin (Thailand)

20 August 2026
16:00 UTC+8

Rovers (Guam)	0–12	(India) East Bengal
	Report	Naorem 6', 22'; Oraon 15'; Anokye 48', 58'; Antwi 49'; Raul 51'; Hemam 56'; Opoku 64', 70'; Kayenpaibam 73'; Guguloth 90+3'

Likas Stadium, Kota Kinabalu
Attendance: 40
Referee: Hanine Merhi (Lebanon)
20 August 2026
20:00 UTC+8

Rajshahi Stars (Bangladesh)	1–2	(Malaysia) Sabah
Sultana 87'	Report	Broussard 42', 80'

Likas Stadium, Kota Kinabalu
Attendance: 1,200
Referee: Rawdha Almansoori (United Arab Emirates)

23 August 2026
16:00 UTC+8

Rovers (Guam)	0–8	(Bangladesh) Rajshahi Stars
	Report	Shamsunnahar 3', 71'; T. Khatun 18', 25', 60'; Connelley 53' (o.g.); M. Chakma 54'; Shamsunnahar Jr. 90+5'

Likas Stadium, Kota Kinabalu
Attendance: 40
Referee: Natalia Sotnikova (Tajikistan)
23 August 2026
20:00 UTC+8

East Bengal (India)	2–0	(Malaysia) Sabah
Anokye 67'; Guguloth 87'	Report

Likas Stadium, Kota Kinabalu
Attendance: 548
Referee: Mu Mingxin (China)

=== Group B ===
- All matches were held in Kyrgyzstan.
- Times listed are UTC+6.

Pos	Team	Pld	W	D	L	GF	GA	GD	Pts	Qualification
1	(Philippines) Kaya–Iloilo	3	2	1	0	11	1	+10	7	Advance to group stage
2	(Hong Kong) TSL	3	2	1	0	6	0	+6	7	
3	(Cambodia) Phnom Penh Crown	3	1	0	2	3	7	−4	3	
4	(Kyrgyzstan) Ilbirs (H)	3	0	0	3	0	12	−12	0	

Source: AFC
Rules for classification: Tiebreakers
(H) Hosts
17 August 2026
16:00 UTC+6

TSL (Hong Kong)	2–0	(Cambodia) Phnom Penh Crown
Liao Meixin 45'; Tsang Lai Mae Halasan 73'	Report

Dolen Omurzakov Stadium, Bishkek
Attendance: 50
Referee: Esraa Al-Mbaiden (Jordan)
17 August 2026
20:00 UTC+6

Kaya–Iloilo (Philippines)	6–0	(Kyrgyzstan) Ilbirs
Carpio 25', 81'; Yoshida 39'; Mendano 57'; Tolentin 72'; Vasquez 90+1'	Report

Dolen Omurzakov Stadium, Bishkek
Attendance: 133
Referee: Azusa Sugino (Japan)

20 August 2026
16:00 UTC+6

Phnom Penh Crown (Cambodia)	1–5	(Philippines) Kaya–Iloilo
Ichikawa 58'	Report	Tolentin 32'; Vasquez 61', 70'; Sarahgen 85', 88'

Dolen Omurzakov Stadium, Bishkek
Attendance: 30
Referee: Nurul Ain Izatty Zainal (Malaysia)
20 August 2026
20:00 UTC+6

Ilbirs (Kyrgyzstan)	0–4	(Hong Kong) TSL
	Report	Leung Hong Kiu Anke 8'; Asanbekova 52' (o.g.); Askhatova 57' (o.g.); Luk Sean Hoi Ching 88'

Dolen Omurzakov Stadium, Bishkek
Attendance: 263
Referee: Bùi Thị Thu Trang (Vietnam)

23 August 2026
16:00 UTC+6

Kaya–Iloilo (Philippines)	0–0	(Hong Kong) TSL
	Report

Dolen Omurzakov Stadium, Bishkek
Attendance: 37
Referee: Supiree Testhomya (Thailand)
23 August 2026
20:00 UTC+6

Phnom Penh Crown (Cambodia)	2–0	(Kyrgyzstan) Ilbirs
Samnang 47'; Airi 56'	Report

Dolen Omurzakov Stadium, Bishkek
Attendance: 130
Referee: Azusa Sugino (Japan)

=== Group C ===
- All matches were held in Uzbekistan.
- Times listed are UTC+5.

Pos	Team	Pld	W	D	L	GF	GA	GD	Pts	Qualification
1	(Uzbekistan) Nasaf (H)	3	3	0	0	21	0	+21	9	Advance to group stage
2	(United Arab Emirates) Banaat	3	1	1	1	10	8	+2	4	
3	(Bhutan) Royal Thimphu College	3	1	1	1	6	4	+2	4	
4	(Laos) Master	3	0	0	3	0	25	−25	0	

Source: AFC
Rules for classification: Tiebreakers
(H) Hosts
17 August 2026
17:00 UTC+5

Banaat (United Arab Emirates)	1–1	(Bhutan) Royal Thimphu College
Al-Zaabi 87'	Report	Janista 25'

Markaziy Stadium, Qarshi
Attendance: 100
Referee: Ranjita Devi Tekcham (India)
17 August 2026
20:00 UTC+5

Nasaf (Uzbekistan)	11–0	(Laos) Master
Karachik 20', 40'; Khabibullaeva 32', 47', 55'; Kudratova 43', 45+3'; Ablyakimova 67'; Egamberdieva 83'; Norboeva 90'; Shoyimova 90+3'	Report

Markaziy Stadium, Qarshi
Attendance: 523
Referee: Yu Hong (China)

20 August 2026
17:00 UTC+5

Master (Laos)	0–9	(United Arab Emirates) Banaat
	Report	Seesavath 22' (o.g.); Mamay 31', 73', 90+6'; Al-Zaabi 33'; Forshaw 52', 90+3'; Al-Shehh 87'; Da Silva 89'

Markaziy Stadium, Qarshi
Attendance: 80
Referee: Plong Pich Akara (Cambodia)
20 August 2026
20:00 UTC+5

Royal Thimphu College (Bhutan)	0–3	(Uzbekistan) Nasaf
	Report	Shoyimova 17', 59'; Egamberdieva 66'

Markaziy Stadium, Qarshi
Attendance: 212
Referee: Ranjita Devi Tekcham (India)

23 August 2026
17:00 UTC+5

Master (Laos)	0–5	(Bhutan) Royal Thimphu College
	Report	Lhazom 42'; Agyei Kuruwaa 50'; Tshering 53'; Janista 56'; Choeki 90+4'

Markaziy Stadium, Qarshi
Attendance: 48
Referee: Wang Chieh (Chinese Taipei)
23 August 2026
20:00 UTC+5

Banaat (United Arab Emirates)	0–7	(Uzbekistan) Nasaf
	Report	Karachik 6'; Shoyimova 12', 76'; Ablyakimova 45+3'; Al-Hosani 67' (o.g.); Khabibullaeva 78', 90+4'

Markaziy Stadium, Qarshi
Attendance: 395
Referee: Yu Hong (China)

=== Group D ===
- All matches were held in Thailand.
- Times listed are UTC+7.

Pos	Team	Pld	W	D	L	GF	GA	GD	Pts	Qualification
1	(North Korea) April 25	3	3	0	0	29	1	+28	9	Advance to group stage
2	(Thailand) College of Asian Scholars (H)	3	2	0	1	26	4	+22	6	
3	(Timor-Leste) S'Amuser	3	1	0	2	3	22	−19	3	
4	(Mongolia) Kharaatsai	3	0	0	3	0	31	−31	0	

Source: AFC
Rules for classification: Tiebreakers
(H) Hosts
17 August 2026
16:00 UTC+7

April 25 (North Korea)	13–0	(Mongolia) Kharaatsai
Jong Pom-hui 1', 42', 45', 85'; Hong Sol-hae 14'; Sin Pom-hyang 15', 62'; Kim Chung-mi 35'; Jo Pom-mi 40'; Choe Song-gyong 52'; Khaliut 81' (o.g.); Jong Sol-hyong 90+3'; Ri Hyon-hui 90+4'	Report

Pathum Thani Stadium, Pathum Thani
Attendance: 25
Referee: Tian Jin (China)
17 August 2026
19:00 UTC+7

College of Asian Scholars (Thailand)	10–0	(Timor-Leste) S'Amuser
Khwanjira 5', 47'; Long 23'; Kanyanat 26', 37'; Philawan 44'; Getty 59'; Taneekarn 69'; U-Raiporn 78'; Iwashita 88'	Report

Pathum Thani Stadium, Pathum Thani
Attendance: 0
Referee: Haneen Murad (Jordan)

20 August 2026
16:00 UTC+7

S'Amuser (Timor-Leste)	0–12	(North Korea) April 25
	Report	Jong Yun-mi 5'; Pak Song-gyong 16'; Jo Pom-mi 28'; Jong Pom-hui 36'; Choe Song-gyong 41'; Ri Myong-chong 52', 86'; Son Jo-ye 58', 80'; Kim Chung-mi 67'; Sin Pom-hyang 88', 90+2'

Pathum Thani Stadium, Pathum Thani
Attendance: 68
Referee: Keomany Phengmeuangkhoun (Laos)
20 August 2026
19:00 UTC+7

Kharaatsai (Mongolia)	0–15	(Thailand) College of Asian Scholars
	Report	Sangrawee 4'; U-Raiporn 20'; Kanyanat 26', 28', 54', 55', 62' (pen.), 64', 89', 90+1'; Taneekarn 33'; Kurumi 41'; Kurisara 73', 79'; Enkhjin 75' (o.g.)

Pathum Thani Stadium, Pathum Thani
Attendance: 182
Referee: Fatemeh Nasiri Looshani (Iran)

23 August 2026
16:00 UTC+7

Kharaatsai (Mongolia)	0–3	(Timor-Leste) S'Amuser
	Report	Marsela 42'; Verdiana 60'; Jessica 64'

Pathum Thani Stadium, Pathum Thani
Attendance: 32
Referee: Nodira Mirzoeva (Tajikistan)
23 August 2026
19:00 UTC+7

College of Asian Scholars (Thailand)	1–4	(North Korea) April 25
Orapin 76'	Report	Kim Chung-mi 13'; Ri Myong-chong 21'; Sin Pom-hyang 26'; Jo Pom-mi 40'

Pathum Thani Stadium, Pathum Thani
Attendance: 256
Referee: Haneen Murad (Jordan)

=== Group E ===
- All matches were held in Tajikistan.
- Times listed are UTC+5.

Pos	Team	Pld	W	D	L	GF	GA	GD	Pts	Qualification
1	(Iran) Bam Khatoon	3	2	1	0	7	2	+5	7	Advance to group stage
2	(Saudi Arabia) Al Nassr	3	1	2	0	15	3	+12	5	
3	(Jordan) Etihad	3	1	1	1	8	6	+2	4	
4	(Tajikistan) CSKA Dushanbe (H)	3	0	0	3	1	20	−19	0	

Source: AFC
Rules for classification: Tiebreakers
(H) Hosts
17 August 2026
17:00 UTC+5

Etihad (Jordan)	2–2	(Saudi Arabia) Al Nassr
Consolino 52'; Hazem 78'	Report	Luvanga 6'; Al-Isa 84'

Hisor Central Stadium, Hisor
Attendance: 25
Referee: Park Se-jin (South Korea)
17 August 2026
20:00 UTC+5

Bam Khatoon (Iran)	3–0	(Tajikistan) CSKA Dushanbe
Didar 9', 71'; Dini 37'	Report

Hisor Central Stadium, Hisor
Attendance: 160
Referee: Khin Nyein Chan (Myanmar)

20 August 2026
17:00 UTC+5

Al Nassr (Saudi Arabia)	1–1	(Iran) Bam Khatoon
Luvanga 84' (pen.)	Report	Didar 90+5'

Hisor Central Stadium, Hisor
Attendance: 50
Referee: Yang Shu-Ting (Chinese Taipei)
20 August 2026
20:00 UTC+5

CSKA Dushanbe (Tajikistan)	1–5	(Jordan) Etihad
Saiyora 73'	Report	Al-Btoush 16', 81'; Salihi 20', 63', 86'

Hisor Central Stadium, Hisor
Attendance: 74
Referee: Yoshimi Yamashita (Japan)

23 August 2026
17:00 UTC+5

Bam Khatoon (Iran)	3–1	(Jordan) Etihad
Didar 32', 76'; Shaban 71'	Report	Al-Btoush 10'

Hisor Central Stadium, Hisor
Attendance: 41
Referee: Veronika Bernatskaia (Kyrgyzstan)
23 August 2026
20:00 UTC+5

Al Nassr (Saudi Arabia)	12–0	(Tajikistan) CSKA Dushanbe
Al-Isa 14', 30', 40'; Luvanga 33' (pen.), 35', 39', 69' (pen.), 74', 87', 89'; Saleh 77'; Al-Shnaifi 90+1'	Report

Hisor Central Stadium, Hisor
Attendance: 120
Referee: Yoshimi Yamashita (Japan)

=== Group F ===
- All matches were held in Myanmar.
- Times listed are UTC+6:30.

Pos	Team	Pld	W	D	L	GF	GA	GD	Pts	Qualification
1	(Myanmar) Ayeyawady (H)	3	3	0	0	13	0	+13	9	Advance to group stage
2	(Chinese Taipei) New Taipei City Hang Yuan	3	2	0	1	8	2	+6	6	
3	(Singapore) FC Jurong	3	1	0	2	3	7	−4	3	
4	(Lebanon) No Limits	3	0	0	3	1	16	−15	0	

Source: AFC
Rules for classification: Tiebreakers
(H) Hosts
17 August 2026
16:00 UTC+6:30

Ayeyawady (Myanmar)	4–0	(Singapore) FC Jurong
Kasai 35'; Win Theingi Tun 55', 78'; Lin Myint Mo 59'	Report

Thuwunna Stadium, Yangon
Attendance: 2,068
Referee: Oh Hyeon-jeong (South Korea)
17 August 2026
19:00 UTC+6:30

New Taipei City Hang Yuan (Chinese Taipei)	6–0	(Lebanon) No Limits
Chen Yu-chin 2'; He Jia-shiuan 8'; Nitta 21'; Miyamoto 46', 85'; Okubo 86'	Report

Thuwunna Stadium, Yangon
Attendance: 52
Referee: Lê Thị Ly (Vietnam)

20 August 2026
16:00 UTC+6:30

No Limits (Lebanon)	0–8	(Myanmar) Ayeyawady
	Report	May Htet Lu 9', 72'; Matsuo 22'; Zin Moe Pyae 24'; Phyu Phyu Win 45+1'; Lin Myint Mo 49'; Mochizuki 55'; Win Theingi Tun 90+3'

Thuwunna Stadium, Yangon
Attendance: 1,648
Referee: Mahnaz Zokaee (Iran)
20 August 2026
19:00 UTC+6:30

FC Jurong (Singapore)	1–2	(Chinese Taipei) New Taipei City Hang Yuan
Kitahara 53'	Report	Miyamoto 38' (pen.); He Jia-Shiuan 64'

Thuwunna Stadium, Yangon
Attendance: 57
Referee: Roziyabonu Yusupova (Uzbekistan)

23 August 2026
16:00 UTC+6:30

New Taipei City Hang Yuan (Chinese Taipei)	0–1	(Myanmar) Ayeyawady
	Report	Lin Myint Mo 57'

Thuwunna Stadium, Yangon
Attendance: 8,860
Referee: Roziyabonu Yusupova (Uzbekistan)
23 August 2026
19:00 UTC+6:30

FC Jurong (Singapore)	2–1	(Lebanon) No Limits
Takashima 15', 27'	Report	Al Moujarkash 88'

Thuwunna Stadium, Yangon
Attendance: 63
Referee: Pansa Chaisanit (Thailand)

== Group stage ==
The draw was conducted on 3 September, 2026 in Kuala Lumpur, with matches to be played in three centralised venues.

=== Seedings ===
Pot 1	Pot 2	Pot 3	Pot 4
(North Korea) Naegohyang (13) (TH) (Australia) Melbourne City (1) (South Korea) Hwacheon KSPO (2)	(Japan) Kobe Leonessa (3) (China) Beijing Jingtan (4) (Vietnam) Hồ Chí Minh City (5)	(Iran) Bam Khatoon (7) (Philippines) Kaya–Iloilo (9) (India) East Bengal (11) (H)	(North Korea) April 25 (13) (Uzbekistan) Nasaf (14) (H) (Myanmar) Ayeyawady (15) (H)

(H) Hosts
(TH) Title holders

=== Group A ===
Pos	Team	Pld	W	D	L	GF	GA	GD	Pts	Qualification
1	(North Korea) Naegohyang	3	3	0	0	14	1	+13	9	Advance to Quarter-finals
2	(Japan) Kobe Leonessa	3	2	0	1	6	2	+4	6	Advance to Quarter-finals
3	(Myanmar) Ayeyawady (H)	3	1	0	2	3	9	−6	3	
4	(Iran) Bam Khatoon	3	0	0	3	2	13	−11	0	

Source: AFC
Rules for classification: Tiebreakers
(H) Hosts
1 November 2026
15:00 UTC+6:30

Kobe Leonessa (Japan)	4–1	(Iran) Bam Khatoon
Narumiya 35'; Kubota 50'; Yamamoto 86'; Tsujisawa 90+1'	Report	Sarbali 59' (pen.)

Thuwunna Stadium, Yangon
Attendance: 102
Referee: Park Se-jin (South Korea)
1 November 2026
19:00 UTC+6:30

Naegohyang (North Korea)	7–0	(Myanmar) Ayeyawady
Ri Kuk-hyang 43'; Ri Yu-jong 45+1'; Jong Kum 53'; Kim Kyong-yong 70' (pen.); Choe Yon-a 81', 90+6'; Choe Kum-ok 90+4'	Report

Thuwunna Stadium, Yangon
Attendance: 890
Referee: Veronika Bernatskaia (Kyrgyzstan)

4 November 2026
15:00 UTC+6:30

Bam Khatoon (Iran)	1–6	(North Korea) Naegohyang
Shaban 67'	Report	Kim Song-ok 26'; Ri Kum-hyang 37'; Pak Ye-gyong 52'; Choe Yon-a 54'; Jong Kum 59'; Hamoudi 88' (o.g.)

Thuwunna Stadium, Yangon
Attendance: 101
Referee: Roziyabonu Yusupova (Uzbekistan)
4 November 2026
19:00 UTC+6:30

Ayeyawady (Myanmar)	0–2	(Japan) Kobe Leonessa
	Report	Mankiri 37'; Minowa 48'

Thuwunna Stadium, Yangon
Attendance: 815
Referee: Bùi Thị Thu Trang (Vietnam)

7 November 2026
15:00 UTC+6:30

Naegohyang (North Korea)	1–0	(Japan) Kobe Leonessa
Jong Kum 49'	Report

Thuwunna Stadium, Yangon
Attendance: 120
Referee: Tian Jin (China)
7 November 2026
19:00 UTC+6:30

Bam Khatoon (Iran)	0–3	(Myanmar) Ayeyawady
	Report	Than Than Nwe 2', 58'; Miyamoto 63'

Thuwunna Stadium, Yangon
Attendance: 976
Referee: Rawdha Almansoori (United Arab Emirates)

=== Group B ===
April 25 (red) vs Hồ Chí Minh City (yellow) during pre-match ceremony at Kishore Bharati.

Pos	Team	Pld	W	D	L	GF	GA	GD	Pts	Qualification
1	(North Korea) April 25	3	3	0	0	10	1	+9	9	Advance to Quarter-finals
2	(South Korea) Hwacheon KSPO	3	2	0	1	8	4	+4	6	Advance to Quarter-finals
3	(India) East Bengal (H)	3	1	0	2	3	7	−4	3	Advance to Quarter-finals
4	(Vietnam) Hồ Chí Minh City	3	0	0	3	2	11	−9	0	

Source: AFC
Rules for classification: Tiebreakers
(H) Hosts
1 November 2026
14:00 UTC+5:30

Hwacheon KSPO (South Korea)	1–2	(North Korea) April 25
Choi Yoo-jung 78'	Report	Choe Il-son 20'; Jong Pok-yong 88'

Kishore Bharati Krirangan, Kolkata
Attendance: 100
Referee: Casey Reibelt (Australia)
1 November 2026
20:00 UTC+5:30

Hồ Chí Minh City (Vietnam)	1–2	(India) East Bengal
Đậu Nguyễn Quỳnh Anh 60'	Report	Ikwaput 21' (pen.), 34'

Kishore Bharati Krirangan, Kolkata
Attendance: 522
Referee: Yoshimi Yamashita (Japan)

4 November 2026
14:00 UTC+5:30

April 25 (North Korea)	6–0	(Vietnam) Hồ Chí Minh City
Myong Yu-jong 8' (pen.); Jong Pok-yong 18'; Jon Ryong-jong 48'; Choe Song-gyong 71', 90+2'; Ri Su-yang 87'	Report

Kishore Bharati Krirangan, Kolkata
Attendance: 50
Referee: Esraa Al-Mbaiden (Jordan)
4 November 2026
20:00 UTC+5:30

East Bengal (India)	1–4	(South Korea) Hwacheon KSPO
Ikwaput 17'	Report	Lee Su-bin 26'; Wie Jae-eun 53' (pen.), 76'; Mun Eun-ju 56'

Kishore Bharati Krirangan, Kolkata
Attendance: 718
Referee: Mu Mingxin (China)

7 November 2026
14:00 UTC+5:30

Hwacheon KSPO (South Korea)	3–1	(Vietnam) Hồ Chí Minh City
Lee Su-bin 45+3', 54'; A. Tanaka 56'	Report	Đậu Nguyễn Quỳnh Anh 88'

Kishore Bharati Krirangan, Kolkata
Attendance: 100
Referee: Supiree Testhomya (Thailand)
7 November 2026
20:00 UTC+5:30

East Bengal (India)	0–2	(North Korea) April 25
	Report	Han Jin-hong 2'; Oh Sol-song 43'

Kishore Bharati Krirangan, Kolkata
Attendance: 539
Referee: Mahnaz Zokaee (Iran)

=== Group C ===
Pos	Team	Pld	W	D	L	GF	GA	GD	Pts	Qualification
1	(Uzbekistan) Nasaf (H)	3	2	0	1	7	2	+5	6 (Note: Tied on head-to-head points. Head-to-head goal difference was used as the tiebreaker; Nasaf +1, Melbourne City 0, Beijing Jingtan −1.)	Advance to Quarter-finals
2	(Australia) Melbourne City	3	2	0	1	9	2	+7	6	Advance to Quarter-finals
3	(China) Beijing Jingtan	3	2	0	1	8	3	+5	6	Advance to Quarter-finals
4	(Philippines) Kaya–Iloilo	3	0	0	3	0	17	−17	0	

Source: AFC
Rules for classification: Tiebreakers
(H) Hosts
Notes:
1 November 2026
15:30 UTC+5

Beijing Jingtan (China)	6–0	(Philippines) Kaya–Iloilo
Traoré 3', 22'; Yoshida 17' (o.g.); Shen Menglu 45+1'; Mahira Ali 50'; Si Yu 78'	Report

Markaziy Stadium, Qarshi
Attendance: 156
Referee: Cha Min-ji (South Korea)
1 November 2026
19:30 UTC+5

Melbourne City (Australia)	0–2	(Uzbekistan) Nasaf
	Report	Khabibullaeva 1'; Karachik 86'

Markaziy Stadium, Qarshi
Attendance: 313
Referee: Ranjita Devi Tekcham (India)

4 November 2026
15:30 UTC+5

Kaya–Iloilo (Philippines)	0–7	(Australia) Melbourne City
	Report	McGroarty 47', 66'; Hayashi 64'; Ayres 71', 84'; Vine 72', 90+2'

Markaziy Stadium, Qarshi
Attendance: 50
Referee: Doumouh Al-Bakkar (Lebanon)
4 November 2026
19:30 UTC+5

Nasaf (Uzbekistan)	1–2	(China) Beijing Jingtan
Egamberdieva 27'	Report	Wang Yanwen 70', 84'

Markaziy Stadium, Qarshi
Attendance: 374
Referee: Pansa Chaisanit (Thailand)

7 November 2026
15:30 UTC+5

Melbourne City (Australia)	2–0	(China) Beijing Jingtan
Ayres 14' (pen.); Keane 89'	Report

Markaziy Stadium, Qarshi
Attendance: 62
Referee: Lê Thị Ly (Vietnam)
7 November 2026
19:30 UTC+5

Kaya–Iloilo (Philippines)	0–4	(Uzbekistan) Nasaf
	Report	Karachik 10'; Khabibullaeva 45+1', 58'; Norboeva 85'

Markaziy Stadium, Qarshi
Attendance: 3,513
Referee: Azusa Sugino (Japan)

=== Ranking of second-placed teams ===
Pos	Grp	Team	Pld	W	D	L	GF	GA	GD	Pts	Qualification
1	C	(Australia) Melbourne City	3	2	0	1	9	2	+7	6	Seeded in Quarter-finals draw
2	B	(South Korea) Hwacheon KSPO	3	2	0	1	8	4	+4	6	Unseeded in Quarter-finals draw
3	A	(Japan) Kobe Leonessa	3	2	0	1	6	2	+4	6	Unseeded in Quarter-finals draw

Source: AFC
Rules for classification: 1) Points; 2) Goal difference; 3) Goals scored; 4) Disciplinary points; 5) Drawing of lots.

=== Ranking of third-placed teams ===
Pos	Grp	Team	Pld	W	D	L	GF	GA	GD	Pts	Qualification
1	C	(China) Beijing Jingtan	3	2	0	1	8	3	+5	6	Advance to Quarter-finals (unseeded)
2	B	(India) East Bengal	3	1	0	2	3	7	−4	3	Advance to Quarter-finals (unseeded)
3	A	(Myanmar) Ayeyawady	3	1	0	2	3	9	−6	3	

Source: AFC
Rules for classification: 1) Points; 2) Goal difference; 3) Goals scored; 4) Disciplinary points; 5) Drawing of lots.

== Knockout stage ==
The knockout stage will be played in a single-leg knockout format. The semi-finals and the final match will be played in a centralised location.

=== Draw ===
The draw will be held on 3 December 2026. For the quarter-finals, teams will be seeded based on their performance in the group stage. The three group winners and the best second-placed team will be seeded and will also be the hosts for the match. Teams from the same group will not be drawn against each other.

Seeded	Unseeded
(North Korea) Naegohyang; (North Korea) April 25; (Uzbekistan) Nasaf; (Australia) Melbourne City	(South Korea) Hwacheon KSPO; (Japan) Kobe Leonessa; (China) Beijing Jingtan; (India) East Bengal

=== Bracket ===
Quarter-finals
27–28 March – TBA
Seeded
Unseeded
27–28 March – TBA
Seeded
Unseeded
27–28 March – TBA
Seeded
Unseeded
27–28 March – TBA
Seeded
Unseeded

Semi-finals
19 May – TBA
QF1 Winner
QF2 Winner
19 May – TBA
QF3 Winner
QF4 Winner

Final
22 May – TBA
SF1 Winner
SF2 Winner

=== Quarter-finals ===
27–28 March 2027
--:--

Naegohyang (North Korea)	–	TBD

27–28 March 2027
--:--

April 25 (North Korea)	–	TBD

27–28 March 2027
--:--

Nasaf (Uzbekistan)	–	TBD

Markaziy Stadium, Qarshi

27–28 March 2027
--:--

Melbourne City (Australia)	–	TBD

=== Semi-finals ===
19 May 2027
--:--

TBD	–	TBD

19 May 2027
--:--

TBD	–	TBD

=== Final ===
22 May 2027
--:--

TBD	–	TBD

== Top scorers ==
Team eliminated / inactive for this round / matches voided by AFC

Rank	Player	Team	MD1	MD2	MD3	QF	SF	F	Total
1	(North Korea) Choe Yon-a	(North Korea) Naegohyang	2	1					3
1	(Uganda) Fazila Ikwaput	(India) East Bengal	2	1					3
1	(North Korea) Jong Kum	(North Korea) Naegohyang	1	1	1				3
1	(South Korea) Lee Su-bin	(South Korea) Hwacheon KSPO		1	2				3
1	(Australia) Melina Ayres	(Australia) Melbourne City		2	1				3
1	(Uzbekistan) Diyorakhon Khabibullaeva	(Uzbekistan) Nasaf	1		2				3
7	(North Korea) Jong Pok-yong	(North Korea) April 25	1	1					2
7	(Mali) Saratou Traoré	(China) Beijing Jingtan	2						2
7	(North Korea) Choe Song-gyong	(North Korea) April 25		2					2
7	(United States) Kelli McGroarty	(Australia) Melbourne City		2					2
7	(Australia) Cortnee Vine	(Australia) Melbourne City		2					2
7	(South Korea) Wie Jae-eun	(South Korea) Hwacheon KSPO		2					2
7	(China) Wang Yanwen	(China) Beijing Jingtan		2					2
7	(Vietnam) Đậu Nguyễn Quỳnh Anh	(Vietnam) Hồ Chí Minh City	1		1				2
7	(Myanmar) Than Than Nwe	(Myanmar) Ayeyawady			2				2
7	(Uzbekistan) Lyudmila Karachik	(Uzbekistan) Nasaf	1		1				2

== See also ==
- 2026–27 AFC Champions League Elite
- 2026–27 AFC Champions League Two
- 2026–27 AFC Challenge League
