= Bhutan Women's National League =

- Organiser(s): Bhutan Football Federation
- Founded: 2021; 5 years ago
- Teams: 10
- International cup(s): AFC Women's Champions League; SAFF Women's Club Championship
- Current champions: Paro FC (2nd title)
- Most championships: RTC (3 titles)
- 2026

The Bhutan Women's National League, currently known as the Bank of Bhutan Women's National League due to sponsorship reasons, is the highest level women's football league in Bhutan.

== History ==
The Women's Football structure in Bhutan started in 2016 through the Thimpu Women's League and the eventual establishment of the Women's National League in 2021. The league's clubs participated in a club licensing workshop with FIFA in 2022.

The following season began in August 2023, with two rounds and six teams, determined from an earlier qualifier tournament participated by eight teams. A third round was added to fulfill FIFA match requirements.

== Clubs ==
2026 season

Tier I

- U20 Gelephu Academy
- Paro FC
- Royal Thimphu College
- Thimphu City WFC
- Transport United WFC
- Ugyen Academy

Tier II

- Gelephu Academy U17
- Gelephu City
- Tsirang WFC
- United Phuentsholing

== Champions ==
=== Thimphu Women's League ===
- 2016: Thimphu City
- 2017: Bhutan U15
- 2018: BFF Academy
- 2019: Sunrise
- 2020: Sunrise

=== Women's National Championship ===
- 2019: Sarpang
- 2020: Suspended due to COVID-19 pandemic

=== Women's National League ===
- 2021: Sunrise
- 2022: Paro FC
- 2023: Royal Thimphu College
- 2024: Royal Thimphu College
- 2025: Royal Thimphu College
- 2026: Paro FC

== See also ==
- Football in Bhutan
- Bhutan Premier League
- SAFF Club Women's Championship
