= Lee Su-bin =

Japanese footballer (born 2005)

Lee Su-bin 이수빈
Personal information
- Date of birth: 26 December 1994 (age 31)
- Place of birth: South Korea
- Height: 1.64 m (5 ft 5 in)
- Position: Midfielder

Team information
- Current team: Hwacheon KSPO
- Number: 94

Senior career*
Years	Team	Apps	(Gls)
2015-2024	Hwacheon KSPO		
2024	INAC Kobe Leonessa		
2025-	Hwacheon KSPO		

International career^{‡}
2024–	South Korea	1	(0)
- * Club domestic league appearances and goals as of 18:10, 26 October 2024 (UTC) ‡ National team caps and goals as of 14:50, 27 November 2024 (UTC)

Lee Su-bin (이수빈, born 26 December 1994) is a South Korean footballer who plays as a midfielder for WK League club Hwacheon KSPO and the South Korea women's national team.

== Club career ==
After success at youth level with Hanyang University, Lee was signed by WK League side Hwacheon KSPO at the 2015 WK League new players draft. In the 2017 WK League playoff match against Icheon Daekyo, Lee scored the winning goal to take KSPO to their first-ever WK League championship final.

In 2024, she transferred to WE League club INAC Kobe Leonessa, signing a two-year contract. After six months in Japan, Lee returned to her former club Hwacheon ahead of the 2025 WK League season.

== International career ==
Lee previously played for South Korea's under-20 team, including at the 2014 FIFA U-20 Women's World Cup. She received her first senior international call-up in 2024 under manager Shin Sang-woo.
