= Hwacheon KSPO WFC =

- Full name: Hwacheon Korea Sports Promotion Foundation Women's Football Club
- Founded: 2011; 15 years ago
- Ground: Hwacheon Sports Park
- Capacity: 2,000
- Owner: Korea Sports Promotion Foundation
- Chairman: Kim Seong-taek
- Head coach: Kang Sun-mi
- League: WK League
- 2026: Regular season: 2nd of 8 Playoffs: Semi-final
- Website: kspo.or.kr
Home colours	Away colours

Hwacheon Korea Sports Promotion Foundation Women's Football Club (Korean: 화천 국민체육진흥공단 여자 축구단) or simply Hwacheon KSPO WFC is a South Korean women's football team based in Hwacheon County, Gangwon Province. The club competes in the WK League, the top division of women's football in South Korea, and plays its home games at the Hwacheon Sports Park. It was founded as Jeonbuk KSPO in 2011, but moved to Hwacheon County ahead of the 2015 season.

== History ==
The Korea Sports Promotion Foundation (KSPO) launched its women's football club in March 2011, signing an agreement with the Sports Council of North Jeolla Province (Jeonbuk) to base the team there and play as Jeonbuk KSPO. Kang Jae-soon was appointed as head coach, working with a small coaching staff and a squad of 23 players in the club's first season. Upon its foundation, Jeonbuk KSPO became the seventh team to join the WK League. The club also hosted friendly matches and football coaching sessions with the aim of promoting grassroots football among girls and women. At the time, there were football programmes for school-age girls in Jeonbuk but with no university or works teams in the province, it was hoped that establishing a semi-professional team would offer a career path for young local talent.

Hwacheon KSPO playing against April 25 during the 2026–27 AFC Women's Champions League.

In 2015, when the WK League first started using the home-and-away system, KSPO accepted bids from various sports councils to become the home base of its women's football team. The foundation accepted the bid of Hwacheon County in Gangwon Province and the team relocated, also citing frequent long-distance travel as a reason for players' recent poor performance. KSPO initially signed a five-year agreement with the county, securing their home base until 2019. They renewed their ties in 2019 and again in 2024, ensuring KSPO's presence in Hwacheon until at least 2029.

In 2024, Hwacheon KSPO finished in first place in the regular league season for the first time in the club's history. However, in the two-legged championship final against Suwon FC, they lost 3–2 on aggregate, becoming WK League runners-up for the second time. After their regular league victory, head coach Kang Jae-soon had stated that he would step down at the end of the 2024 season to take on the role of general manager at the club, with Kang Sun-mi replacing him as head coach.

Hwacheon KSPO had another successful year in 2025, staying at the top of the WK League table for much of the season and claiming the regular league title for the second year in a row. This time they faced Seoul City Amazones in the championship final, beating them 7–5 on aggregate to lift the club's first ever WK League trophy and qualify for the 2026–27 AFC Women's Champions League. By winning the league title, KSPO also became the first South Korean women's team to complete a domestic treble, having already won the National Women's Football Championship and the National Sports Festival.

== Current squad ==
As of 6 March 2026

Note: Flags indicate national team as defined under FIFA eligibility rules; some limited exceptions apply. Players may hold more than one non-FIFA nationality.

No.	Pos.	Nation	Player
1	GK	KOR	Min Yu-kyeong
2	DF	KOR	Jung Ji-yeon (captain)
4	MF	JPN	Asuna Tanaka
6	DF	KOR	Cho Ye-jin
7	MF	KOR	Yoon Ji-hyun
8	DF	KOR	Kwak Min-young
10	FW	KOR	Choi Yoo-jung
11	MF	KOR	Wie Jae-eun
13	MF	KOR	Seo Min-a
14	MF	KOR	Shin Su-min
15	MF	KOR	Mok Seung-yeon
16	FW	KOR	Mun Eun-ju
17	MF	KOR	Choi Jeong-min
18	GK	KOR	Hong Yoo-jin

No.	Pos.	Nation	Player
19	DF	KOR	Kim Hyun-a
20	DF	KOR	Lee Min-hwa (vice-captain)
21	GK	KOR	Kim Min-young
22	DF	KOR	Choi Min-a
23	DF	KOR	Cheon Se-hwa
24	MF	JPN	Sae Kitakata
25	MF	KOR	Go Eun-bin
26	DF	KOR	Kim Yu-ri
27	DF	KOR	Yeon Ye-jin
28	FW	KOR	Lee Soo-bin
29	FW	KOR	Baek Jin-ju
30	DF	KOR	Kim Ji-hyun
94	MF	KOR	Lee Su-bin (vice-captain)

== Backroom staff ==
=== Coaching staff ===
- Manager: (South Korea) Kang Sun-mi
- Goalkeeping coach: (South Korea) Im Jong-guk
- Coach: (South Korea) Lee Sae-um
- Technical director: (South Korea) Kang Jae-soon
- Trainer: (South Korea) Park Su-min

Source: Official website

== Honours ==
- WK League
  - Winners (1): 2025
  - Runners-up (2): 2017, 2024
- National Women's Football Championship
  - Winners (1): 2025
  - Runners-up (2): 2016, 2023

== Season-by-season records ==
Season	WK League regular season								Playoffs
Season	P	W	D	L	GF	GA	Pts	Pos	Playoffs
2011	21	1	3	17	17	46	6	7th	Did not qualify
2012	21	10	2	9	30	32	32	3rd	Semifinal
2013	24	8	6	10	28	38	30	4th	Did not qualify
2014	24	4	4	16	26	43	16	7th	Did not qualify
2015	24	8	10	6	34	28	34	4th	Did not qualify
2016	24	9	6	9	35	32	33	4th	Did not qualify
2017	28	13	7	8	45	50	46	3rd	Runners-up
2018	28	13	5	10	52	45	44	5th	Did not qualify
2019	28	12	8	8	49	39	44	4th	Did not qualify
2020	21	9	5	7	24	31	32	4th	Did not qualify
2021	21	7	7	7	28	30	28	5th	Did not qualify
2022	21	9	7	5	36	25	34	4th	Did not qualify
2023	21	12	5	4	33	18	41	2nd	Semifinal
2024	28	16	8	4	49	27	56	1st	Runners-up
2025	28	16	9	3	56	23	57	1st	Winners
2026	28	15	10	3	39	14	55	2nd	Semifinal

== Continental record ==
A kick-off moment during Hwacheon KSPO vs April 25 match

All results list Hwacheon's goal tally first.

Season	Competition	Round	Opposition	Result
2026–27	AFC Women's Champions League	Group B	(North Korea) April 25	1–2
2026–27	AFC Women's Champions League	Group B	(India) East Bengal	4–1
2026–27	AFC Women's Champions League	Group B	(Vietnam) Hồ Chí Minh City	3–1
2026–27	AFC Women's Champions League	Quarter-finals		
