= 2017 WK League =

WK League
- Season: 2017
- Dates: 14 April – 6 November 2017
- Champions: Incheon Hyundai Steel Red Angels (5th title)
- Matches: 112
- Goals: 342 (3.05 per match)
- Top goalscorer: Bia Zaneratto (24 goals)
- Highest scoring: Incheon 11–1 Hwacheon
- Longest unbeaten run: 15 matches Incheon
- Longest winless run: 13 matches Boeun
- (Note: All statistics do not include play-off matches)

The 2017 WK League was the ninth season of the WK League, the top division of women's football in South Korea. The regular season began on 14 April 2017 and ended on 6 November 2017. Gyeongju KHNP joined the league in the off-season. Incheon Hyundai Steel Red Angels won their fifth consecutive title.

== Teams ==
Locations of the 2017 WK League teams

Team	City	Stadium	Capacity	Position in 2016
Boeun Sangmu	Boeun	Boeun Public Stadium	6,000	7th place
Gumi Sportstoto	Gumi	Gumi Civic Stadium	35,000	3rd place
Gyeongju KHNP	Gyeongju	Gyeongju Football Park	650	—
Hwacheon KSPO	Hwacheon	Hwacheon Sports Park	3,000	4th place
Icheon Daekyo	Icheon	Icheon Sports Complex	20,305	Runners-up
Incheon Hyundai Steel Red Angels	Incheon	Incheon Namdong Asiad Rugby Field	5,078	Champions
Seoul WFC	Seoul	Hyochang Stadium	15,194	5th place
Suwon FMC	Suwon	Suwon Sports Complex	11,808	6th place

== Regular season ==
=== League table ===
Pos	Team	Pld	W	D	L	GF	GA	GD	Pts	Qualification
1	Incheon Hyundai Steel Red Angels (C)	28	22	4	2	88	18	+70	70	Qualification for playoffs final
2	Icheon Daekyo	28	16	5	7	51	34	+17	53	Qualification for playoffs semi-final
3	Hwacheon KSPO	28	13	7	8	45	50	−5	46	Qualification for playoffs semi-final
4	Seoul WFC	28	12	5	11	40	43	−3	41	
5	Suwon FMC	28	9	10	9	39	38	+1	37	
6	Gumi Sportstoto	28	8	7	13	34	43	−9	31	
7	Gyeongju KHNP	28	5	6	17	23	53	−30	21	
8	Boeun Sangmu	28	3	4	21	22	63	−41	13	

Source: Soccerway
(C) Champions

=== Results ===
==== Matches 1–14 ====
Home \ Away	BOE	ICD	GUM	GYE	HWA	INC	SEO	SUW
Boeun Sangmu	—	0–3	1–3	1–0	0–0	2–3	1–3	2–5
Icheon Daekyo	2–1	—	3–2	4–1	1–2	0–2	2–0	2–1
Gumi Sportstoto	4–1	1–2	—	2–1	1–0	2–4	0–1	1–1
Gyeongju KHNP	1–0	0–1	0–2	—	2–2	0–4	1–3	0–1
Hwacheon KSPO	3–1	1–0	3–2	2–1	—	1–4	1–3	1–3
Incheon Hyundai Steel Red Angels	5–1	3–1	1–1	6–0	4–0	—	5–0	0–0
Seoul WFC	1–2	0–0	3–2	1–1	2–2	0–5	—	1–0
Suwon FMC	1–1	1–0	1–1	1–1	1–1	2–1	1–1	—

Source: Soccerway
Legend: Blue = home team win; Yellow = draw; Red = away team win.

==== Matches 15–28 ====
Home \ Away	BOE	ICD	GUM	GYE	HWA	INC	SEO	SUW
Boeun Sangmu	—	1–2	0–0	0–3	0–3	0–3	0–0	0–1
Icheon Daekyo	4–1	—	0–0	3–0	2–2	1–2	5–1	1–1
Gumi Sportstoto	1–0	1–2	—	1–0	0–1	0–5	1–2	1–3
Gyeongju KHNP	2–1	1–1	0–0	—	1–1	2–3	0–4	1–4
Hwacheon KSPO	3–2	1–2	1–0	2–0	—	0–2	5–1	2–0
Incheon Hyundai Steel Red Angels	4–0	4–0	1–1	0–1	11–1	—	2–0	1–1
Seoul WFC	0–0	2–3	2–0	2–1	1–2	0–3	—	4–0
Suwon FMC	2–1	2–4	1–2	1–2	1–2	1–4	1–2	—

Source: Soccerway
Legend: Blue = home team win; Yellow = draw; Red = away team win.

== Statistics ==
=== Top scorers ===
Rank	Player	Club	Goals
1	(Brazil) Bia Zaneratto	Incheon Hyundai Steel Red Angels	24
2	(South Korea) Lee Min-a	Incheon Hyundai Steel Red Angels	14
3	(South Korea) Park Eun-sun	Icheon Daekyo	13
4	(South Korea) Lee Geum-min	Seoul WFC	11
5	(Brazil) Thaís Guedes	Incheon Hyundai Steel Red Angels	10

=== Top assist providers ===
Rank	Player	Club	Assists
1	(Brazil) Bia Zaneratto	Incheon Hyundai Steel Red Angels	14
2	(South Korea) Lee Min-a	Incheon Hyundai Steel Red Angels	10
3	(Brazil) Thaís Guedes	Incheon Hyundai Steel Red Angels	9
3	(South Korea) Roh So-mi	Seoul WFC	9
5	(South Korea) Park Ji-young	Icheon Daekyo	8
5	(South Korea) Lee Se-eun	Incheon Hyundai Steel Red Angels	8

== Championship playoffs ==
The semi-final was contested between Icheon Daekyo and Hwacheon KSPO, the second and third-placed teams in the regular season, respectively. Hwacheon KSPO advanced to the two-legged final after defeating Icheon Daekyo 2–1, but lost 6–0 on aggregate to regular season winners Incheon Hyundai Steel Red Angels in the final.

=== Bracket ===
Semi-final			Final
			1	Incheon Hyundai Steel Red Angels	3	3	6
2	Icheon Daekyo	1		Hwacheon KSPO	0	0	0
3	Hwacheon KSPO	2

=== Semi-final ===
13 November 2017
19:00 UTC+9

Icheon Daekyo	1–2	Hwacheon KSPO
	Report

Icheon Stadium, Icheon
Attendance: 987

=== Final ===
17 November 2017
18:00 UTC+9

Hwacheon KSPO	0–3	Incheon Hyundai Steel Red Angels
	Report

Hwacheon Sports Park, Hwacheon

20 November 2017
18:00 UTC+9

Incheon Hyundai Steel Red Angels	3–0	Hwacheon KSPO
	Report

Incheon Namdong Asiad Rugby Field, Incheon
Attendance: 1,127

Incheon Hyundai Steel Red Angels won 6–0 on aggregate.
