= Royal Thimphu College Women's FC =

Royal Thimphu College
- Full name: Royal Thimphu College Women's Football Club
- Short name: RTC
- Founded: 2022; 4 years ago
- Ground: Changlimithang Stadium; RTC Ground
- Capacity: 15,000
- Owner: Royal Thimphu College
- Head coach: Lobzang Dorji
- League: Bhutan Women's National League
- 2025: Bhutan Women's National League, 1st of 6 (champions)
Home colours	Away colours

Royal Thimphu College Women's Football Club, abbreviated as RTC, is a Bhutanese women's professional football club. They are affiliated with the Royal Thimphu College in Thimphu.

== History ==
The Royal Thimphu College (RTC) Women's FC was established in 2022. After winning the 2023–24 national league, they competed in the inaugural AFC Women's Champions League in 2024–25. RTC hosted the Iranian club Bam Khatoon and Hong Kong's Kitchee at home for the preliminary round. RTC would employ the service of four Bangladesh national team players for the campaign. They failed to advance to the competition proper.

== Squad (2025) ==
Note: Flags indicate national team as defined under FIFA eligibility rules; some limited exceptions apply. Players may hold more than one non-FIFA nationality.

No.	Pos.	Nation	Player
1	GK	MEX	Jaqueline Catano
3	DF	BHU	Phuntsho Choden
5	DF	BHU	Suk Maya Ghalley
6	MF	BHU	Deki Yangdon
7	MF	BAN	Sapna Rani
8	FW	BHU	Pema Kunzang Choekyi
9	FW	BHU	Tshering Lhaden
10	MF	BHU	Sonam Lhamo
11	MF	BHU	Yeshey Bidha
12	FW	BAN	Tohura Khatun
15	DF	BHU	Sonam Choden

No.	Pos.	Nation	Player
16	DF	BHU	Dorji Edon
17	DF	BHU	Sonam Gaki Pelzom
18	MF	BHU	Tshering Yangchen
19	FW	BHU	Deki Lhazom
21	GK	BHU	Karma Yuden
22	GK	BHU	Kinzang Dema
25	MF	BHU	Choney Wangmo
27	FW	BHU	Namgyel Dema
30	FW	BAN	Shamsunnahar Jr.
33	DF	BAN	Afeida Khandaker
75	MF	BAN	Shaheda Akter Ripa

== Continental record ==
AFC Women's Champions League
Season	Position	Pld	W	D	L	GF	GA	GD
2024–25	Preliminary stage	2	0	0	2	1	3	–2
2025–26	Preliminary stage	3	1	0	2	5	9	–4
2026–27	Preliminary stage	3	1	1	1	6	4	+2

All results list Royal Thimphu College' goal tally first.

Season	Round	Club	Score	Aggregate
2024–25	Group D (Preliminary stage)	(Iran) Bam Khatoon	1–2	3rd out of 3
2024–25	Group D (Preliminary stage)	(Hong Kong) Kitchee	0–1	3rd out of 3
2025–26	Group D (Preliminary stage)	(Chinese Taipei) Kaohsiung Attackers	0–2	3rd out of 4
2025–26	Group D (Preliminary stage)	(North Korea) Naegohyang	0–7	3rd out of 4
2025–26	Group D (Preliminary stage)	(Laos) Master	5–0	3rd out of 4
2026–27	Group C (Preliminary stage)	(United Arab Emirates) Banaat	1–1	3rd out of 4
2026–27	Group C (Preliminary stage)	(Uzbekistan) PFC Nasaf	0–3	3rd out of 4
2026–27	Group C (Preliminary stage)	(Laos) Master	5–0	3rd out of 4

== Honours ==
=== League ===
- Bhutan Women's National League

Champions (3): 2023, 2024, 2025
