= Wie Jae-eun =

South Korean footballer (born 1996)

Personal information
- Date of birth: August 23, 1996 (age 30)
- Place of birth: Incheon, South Korea
- Height: 1.66 m (5 ft 5 in)
- Position: Winger

Team information
- Current team: Hwacheon KSPO
- Number: 11

Youth career
- Incheon Garim Elementary School
- Gajeong Girls Middle School
- Incheon Design High School
- Osan I.C.T. High School
- Korea University

Senior career*
Years	Team	Apps	(Gls)
2019	Incheon Hyundai		
2020-2021	Changnyeong WFC		
2022-	Hwacheon KSPO		
- * Club domestic league appearances and goals

Wie Jae-eun (Korean: 위재은; born 23 August 1996) is a South Korean professional footballer who plays as a winger for WK League club Hwacheon KSPO.

== Club career ==
Wie signed a one-year contract with Incheon Hyundai Steel Red Angels after being selected by the club at the 2019 WK League new players draft. Having received few opportunities to play for Incheon, Wie transferred to Changnyeong WFC ahead of the 2020 season, but again found herself often overlooked in favour of more established players.

Following the departure of Son Hwa-yeon and Hong Hye-ji, Wie was given more playing time in her second season at Changnyeong, recording three goals and one assist in ten appearances, and receiving a Player of the Match award for the first time.

Wie transferred to Hwacheon KSPO ahead of the 2022 season and finally found herself in an environment where she could flourish, becoming a key member of the squad. She was named MVP after the first leg of the 2025 WK League championship final against Seoul City, scoring one goal and providing two assists. She recorded another goal and another assist in the second leg of the final, playing an important role in Hwacheon KSPO's first ever WK League title and the first ever domestic treble in South Korean women's football.

Wie missed several matches in the 2026 season due to a knee injury but returned to the field in the summer and was named Round 11 MVP after scoring the winning goal in a rescheduled fixture against Incheon Hyundai Steel Red Angels. She later scored a brace in Hwacheon KSPO's 4–1 victory over East Bengal FC in the group stage of the 2026-27 AFC Women's Champions League.

== Honours ==
=== Hwacheon KSPO ===
- WK League
  - Winners: 2025
  - Runners-up: 2024
- National Women's Football Championship
  - Winners: 2025
- National Sports Festival
  - Winners: 2025
