= Royal Thimphu College FC =

Association football club in Bhutan

- Short name: RTC FC
- Founded: 2009; 17 years ago
- Ground: RTC Football Ground
- Capacity: 2,500
- Owner: Royal Thimphu College
- League: Bhutan Premier League
- 2025: 3rd
- Website: Website

Royal Thimphu College FC is a Bhutanese professional football club based in Thimphu currently competing in the Bhutan Premier League. The club was founded in 2009.

== Stadium ==
The club plays some home matches at the artificial turf playing field at the Royal Thimphu College.
