= Football at the 2018 Asian Games – Women's team squads =

The following is a list of squads for each nation competing in women's football at the 2018 Asian Games in Palembang.

== Group A ==
=== Chinese Taipei ===
The following is the Chinese Taipei squad in the women's football tournament of the 2018 Asian Games.

Head coach: (Japan) Hiroyuki Horino

No.	Pos.	Player	Date of birth (age)	Caps	Goals	Club
1	GK	Tsai Ming-jung	23 January 1989 (aged 29)			(Chinese Taipei Football Association) Taichung Blue Whale
18	GK	Chu Fang-yi	30 August 1989 (aged 28)			(Chinese Taipei Football Association) Taipei Play One
2	DF	Lin Kai-ling	21 September 1991 (aged 26)			(Chinese Taipei Football Association) Hualien
5	DF	Chen Ya-huei	28 November 1986 (aged 31)			(Chinese Taipei Football Association) Hualien
11	DF	Lai Li-chin	15 August 1988 (aged 30)			(Chinese Taipei Football Association) Taichung Blue Whale
14	DF	Kao Pei-ling	23 December 1996 (aged 21)			(Chinese Taipei Football Association) Taichung Blue Whale
19	DF	Su Sin-yun	20 November 1996 (aged 21)			(Chinese Taipei Football Association) Hualien
3	MF	Jhuo Li-shan	20 October 1996 (aged 21)			(Chinese Taipei Football Association) Hualien
4	MF	Pao Hsin-hsuan	1 September 1992 (aged 25)			(Chinese Taipei Football Association) Taichung Blue Whale
6	MF	Lin Ya-han	15 December 1990 (aged 27)			(Chinese Taipei Football Association) Taipei Play One
7	MF	Liu Chien-yun	8 August 1992 (aged 26)			(Chinese Taipei Football Association) Taichung Blue Whale
8	MF	Wang Hsiang-huei	28 September 1987 (aged 30)			(Chinese Football Association) Beijing Phoenix
12	MF	Tsou Hsin-ni	11 January 1995 (aged 23)			(Chinese Taipei Football Association) Taichung Blue Whale
15	MF	Pan Shin-yu	3 May 1997 (aged 21)			(Chinese Taipei Football Association) Kaohsiung Yangxin
16	MF	Chan Pi-han	27 April 1992 (aged 26)			(Chinese Taipei Football Association) Hualien
20	MF	Zhuo Li-ping	29 September 1999 (aged 18)			(Chinese Taipei Football Association) Hualien
9	FW	Lee Hsiu-chin	18 August 1992 (aged 25)			(Chinese Taipei Football Association) Taichung Blue Whale
10	FW	Yu Hsiu-chin	1 June 1990 (aged 28)			(Chinese Football Association) Beijing Phoenix
13	FW	Chen Yen-ping	20 August 1991 (aged 26)			(Chinese Taipei Football Association) Taipei Play One
17	FW	Ting Chi	2 June 1995 (aged 23)			(Chinese Taipei Football Association) Taipei Play One

=== Indonesia ===
The following is the Indonesia squad in the women's football tournament of the 2018 Asian Games.

Head Coach: Ijatna Satia Bagda

No.	Pos.	Player	Date of birth (age)	Caps	Goals	Club
1	GK	Norffince Boma	26 April 1995 (aged 23)			(Football Association of Indonesia) Galanita Papua
20	GK	Vera Lestari	17 January 1995 (aged 23)			(Football Association of Indonesia) NPS FC Surabaya
2	DF	Safira Kartini	21 April 2003 (aged 15)			(Football Association of Indonesia) Galanita Babel
3	DF	Vivi Riski	7 March 1997 (aged 21)			(Football Association of Indonesia) Galanita Babel
4	DF	Ade Mustikiana	3 October 1999 (aged 18)			(Football Association of Indonesia) Galanita Babel
12	DF	Rizky Amalia Putri	4 May 2000 (aged 18)			(Football Association of Indonesia) NPS FC Surabaya
13	DF	Nurlaili Khomariyah	7 June 1996 (aged 22)			(Football Association of Indonesia) NPS FC Surabaya
14	DF	Rahma Wulan Aprilita	22 April 1996 (aged 22)			(Football Association of Indonesia) Jaya Kencana Angels
16	DF	Jesella Arifya Sari	6 March 2002 (aged 16)			(Football Association of Indonesia) Banteng Muda Malang
5	MF	Tia Darti Septiawati	24 September 1993 (aged 24)			(Football Association of Indonesia) Banteng Muda Malang
6	MF	Maulina Novryliani	14 November 1987 (aged 30)			(Football Association of Indonesia) Kebumen United Angels
7	MF	Yudith Herlina Sada	15 December 1990 (aged 27)			(Football Association of Indonesia) Galanita Papua
8	MF	Rani Mulyasari	4 March 1993 (aged 25)			(Football Association of Indonesia) UPI Bandung
10	MF	Dhanielle Daphne	20 April 2000 (aged 18)			(Football Association of Indonesia) Galanita Jabar
11	MF	Zahra Musdalifah	4 April 2001 (aged 17)			(Football Association of Indonesia) Galanita Banten
15	MF	Dwie Aprilliani	26 April 1991 (aged 27)			(Football Association of Indonesia) Pansa FC Bantul
17	MF	Susi Susanti	22 August 1990 (aged 27)			(Football Association of Indonesia) Jaya Kencana Angels
18	MF	Syenida Meryfandia	16 March 1996 (aged 22)			(Football Association of Indonesia) Jaya Kencana Angels
9	FW	Mayang Zp	16 July 1993 (aged 25)			(Football Association of Malaysia) Selangor
19	FW	Tugiyati Cindy	21 July 1985 (aged 33)			(Football Association of Indonesia) Banteng Muda Malang

=== Maldives ===
The following is the Maldives squad in the women's football tournament of the 2018 Asian Games.

Head Coach: Athif Mohamed

No.	Pos.	Player	Date of birth (age)	Caps	Goals	Club
1	GK	Aminath Leeza	25 November 1986 (aged 31)			(Football Association of Maldives) Police Club
18	GK	Aishath Abdul Razzaq	20 October 1980 (aged 37)			
22	GK	Saiga Hussain	26 March 1993 (aged 25)			(Football Association of Maldives) MNDF
2	DF	Fathimath Zahira	31 March 1991 (aged 27)			(Football Association of Maldives) Police Club
4	DF	Aishath Maahin	6 August 1988 (aged 30)			(Football Association of Maldives) Ooredoo Maldives
6	DF	Fathimath Afza	1 November 1988 (aged 29)			(Football Association of Maldives) Dhivehi Sifainge Club
15	DF	Aminath Zaahiya	11 July 1993 (aged 25)			(Football Association of Maldives) Team Fenaka
17	DF	Hawwa Haneefa	31 January 1990 (aged 28)			(Football Association of Maldives) WAMCO
19	DF	Sheeneez Mohamed	25 November 1986 (aged 31)			(Football Association of Maldives) Police Club
21	DF	Sanfa Ibrahim Didi	27 April 1985 (aged 33)			(Football Association of Maldives) Police Club
5	MF	Shiyana Ahmed Zubair	1 January 1988 (aged 30)			(Football Association of Maldives) STO
7	MF	Fadhuwa Zahir	7 May 1986 (aged 32)			(Football Association of Maldives) Police Club
9	MF	Shahula Thaufeeq	8 December 1992 (aged 25)			(Football Association of Maldives) Team Fenaka
11	MF	Aishath Samaa	26 March 1994 (aged 24)			(Football Association of Maldives) New Radiant
14	MF	Mariyam Mirfath	16 May 1985 (aged 33)			(Football Association of Maldives) Club Immigration
24	MF	Azina Abdul Matheen	10 September 1991 (aged 26)			(Football Association of Maldives) Customs RC
8	FW	Mariyam Rifa	29 August 1992 (aged 25)			(Football Association of Maldives) MPL
10	FW	Aminath Shamila	14 May 1993 (aged 25)			(Football Association of Maldives) MPL
12	FW	Mariyam Nishfa Faid	8 March 2002 (aged 16)			
13	FW	Safiyya Rafa	9 April 1998 (aged 20)			(Football Association of Maldives) WAMCO

=== South Korea ===
The following is the South Korea squad in the women's football tournament of the 2018 Asian Games. The team of 20 players was officially named on 19 July.

Head coach: (South Korea) Yoon Deok-yeo

No.	Pos.	Player	Date of birth (age)	Caps	Goals	Club
1	GK	Yoon Young-geul	28 October 1987 (aged 30)	9	0	(Korea Football Association) Gyeongju KHNP
18	GK	Jung Bo-ram	22 July 1991 (aged 27)	2	0	(Korea Football Association) Hwacheon KSPO
2	DF	Jang Sel-gi	31 May 1994 (aged 24)	42	9	(Korea Football Association) Incheon Hyundai Steel Red Angels
3	DF	Shin Dam-yeong	2 October 1993 (aged 24)	28	1	(Korea Football Association) Suwon FMC
4	DF	Shim Seo-yeon	15 April 1989 (aged 29)	54	0	(Korea Football Association) Incheon Hyundai Steel Red Angels
5	DF	Hong Hye-ji	25 August 1996 (aged 21)	11	1	(Korea Football Association) Changnyeong
6	DF	Lim Seon-joo	27 November 1990 (aged 27)	65	4	(Korea Football Association) Incheon Hyundai Steel Red Angels
19	DF	Lee Eun-mi	18 August 1988 (aged 29)	79	13	(Korea Football Association) Suwon FMC
20	DF	Kim Hye-ri	25 June 1990 (aged 28)	73	1	(Korea Football Association) Incheon Hyundai Steel Red Angels
7	MF	Lee Min-a	8 November 1991 (aged 26)	45	11	(Japan Football Association) INAC Kobe Leonessa
8	MF	Cho So-hyun	24 June 1988 (aged 30)	112	20	(Norwegian Football Federation) Avaldsnes IL
10	MF	Ji So-yun	21 February 1991 (aged 27)	103	45	(The Football Association) Chelsea
12	MF	Moon Mi-ra	28 February 1992 (aged 26)	11	3	(Korea Football Association) Suwon FMC
15	MF	Jang Chang	21 June 1996 (aged 22)	7	0	(Korea Football Association) Korea University
9	FW	Jeon Ga-eul	14 September 1988 (aged 29)	91	35	(Korea Football Association) Hwacheon KSPO
11	FW	Lee Geum-min	7 April 1994 (aged 24)	37	12	(Korea Football Association) Gyeongju KHNP
13	FW	Han Chae-rin	2 September 1996 (aged 21)	11	3	(Korea Football Association) Incheon Hyundai Steel Red Angels
14	FW	Choe Yu-ri	16 September 1994 (aged 23)	23	4	(Korea Football Association) Gumi Sportstoto
16	FW	Son Hwa-yeon	15 March 1997 (aged 21)	8	2	(Korea Football Association) Changnyeong
17	FW	Lee Hyun-young	16 February 1991 (aged 27)	14	5	(Korea Football Association) Suwon FMC

== Group B ==
=== China PR ===
The following is the China squad in the women's football tournament of the 2018 Asian Games. The team of 20 players was officially named on 10 August.

Head coach: (China) Jia Xiuquan

No.	Pos.	Player	Date of birth (age)	Club
1	GK	Zhao Lina	18 September 1991 (aged 26)	(Chinese Football Association) Shanghai
19	GK	Bi Xiaolin	18 September 1989 (aged 28)	(Chinese Football Association) Dalian Quanjian
2	DF	Han Peng	20 December 1989 (aged 28)	(Chinese Football Association) Changchun
3	DF	Huang Yini	20 January 1993 (aged 25)	(Chinese Football Association) Shanghai
4	DF	Lou Jiahui	26 May 1991 (aged 27)	(Chinese Football Association) Henan Huishang
5	DF	Wu Haiyan (captain)	26 February 1993 (aged 25)	(Chinese Football Association) Wuhan
6	DF	Lin Yuping	28 February 1992 (aged 26)	(Chinese Football Association) Wuhan
8	DF	Li Jiayue	8 June 1990 (aged 28)	(Chinese Football Association) Shanghai
14	DF	Zhao Rong	2 August 1991 (aged 27)	(Chinese Football Association) Beijing Phoenix
18	DF	Li Mengwen	28 March 1995 (aged 23)	(Chinese Football Association) Jiangsu Suning
7	MF	Wang Shuang	23 January 1995 (aged 23)	(French Football Federation) Paris Saint-Germain
9	MF	Ren Guixin	19 December 1988 (aged 29)	(Chinese Football Association) Changchun
12	MF	Wang Yan	22 August 1991 (aged 26)	(Chinese Football Association) Dalian Quanjian
13	MF	Li Tingting	3 April 1995 (aged 23)	(Chinese Football Association) Shandong
16	MF	Yang Lina	13 April 1994 (aged 24)	(Chinese Football Association) Shanghai
17	MF	Gu Yasha	28 November 1990 (aged 27)	(Chinese Football Association) Beijing Phoenix
20	MF	Zhang Rui	17 January 1989 (aged 29)	(Chinese Football Association) Changchun
10	FW	Li Ying	7 January 1993 (aged 25)	(Chinese Football Association) Shandong
11	FW	Wang Shanshan	27 January 1990 (aged 28)	(Chinese Football Association) Dalian Quanjian
15	FW	Xiao Yuyi	10 January 1996 (aged 22)	(Chinese Football Association) Shanghai

=== Hong Kong ===
The following is the Hong Kong squad in the women's football tournament of the 2018 Asian Games.

Head coach: (Brazil) José Ricardo Rambo

No.	Pos.	Player	Date of birth (age)	Caps	Goals	Club
1	GK	Leung Wai Nga	24 August 1988 (aged 29)			(Football Association of Hong Kong, China) Kitchee
18	GK	Ng Cheuk Wai	19 March 1997 (aged 21)			(Football Association of Hong Kong, China) Happy Valley
2	DF	Chung Pui Ki	2 February 1998 (aged 20)			(Football Association of Hong Kong, China) Kitchee
3	DF	Chu Ling Ling	15 February 1987 (aged 31)			(Football Association of Hong Kong, China) Citizen
10	DF	Sin Chung Yee	8 August 1992 (aged 26)			(Football Association of Hong Kong, China) Happy Valley
13	DF	Ma Chak Shun	2 March 1996 (aged 22)			(Football Association of Hong Kong, China) Happy Valley
16	DF	Wong So Han	26 November 1991 (aged 26)			(Football Association of Hong Kong, China) Happy Valley
17	DF	Kwok Ching Man	7 June 1993 (aged 25)			(Football Association of Hong Kong, China) Citizen
21	DF	Lydia Mak	29 April 1999 (aged 19)			(Football Association of Hong Kong, China) Tai Po
4	MF	Yiu Hei Man	22 September 1990 (aged 27)			(Football Association of Hong Kong, China) Happy Valley
5	MF	Lau Yui Ching	15 August 1994 (aged 24)			(Football Association of Hong Kong, China) Lung Moon
6	MF	Chan Wing Sze (captain)	11 September 1983 (aged 34)			(Football Association of Hong Kong, China) Citizen
8	MF	Cham Ching Man	1 May 1996 (aged 22)			(Football Association of Hong Kong, China) Happy Valley
9	MF	Wai Yuen Ting	15 October 1992 (aged 25)			(Football Association of Hong Kong, China) Citizen
11	MF	Chun Ching Hang	16 July 1989 (aged 29)			(Football Association of Wales) Swansea
14	MF	Lee Wing Yan	28 April 1997 (aged 21)			(Football Association of Hong Kong, China) Happy Valley
7	FW	Cheung Wai Ki	22 November 1990 (aged 27)			(Football Australia) Brisbane Roar
12	FW	Kay Fung	8 November 1988 (aged 29)			(Football Association of Hong Kong, China) Citizen
15	FW	Heidi Yuen	22 August 1992 (aged 25)			(Football Association of Hong Kong, China) Citizen
23	FW	Ho Mui Mei	15 March 1993 (aged 25)			(Football Association of Hong Kong, China) Citizen

=== North Korea ===
The following is the North Korea squad in the women's football tournament of the 2018 Asian Games.

Head coach: (North Korea) Kim Kwang-min

No.	Pos.	Player	Date of birth (age)	Caps	Goals	Club
1	GK	Paek Yong-hui	16 April 1990 (aged 28)			(DPR Korea Football Association) Pyongyang City
18	GK	Kim Myong-sun	6 March 1997 (aged 21)			(DPR Korea Football Association) Sobaeksu
19	GK	Choe Kyong-im	15 July 1993 (aged 25)			
2	DF	Ri Un-yong	1 September 1996 (aged 21)			(DPR Korea Football Association) Sobaeksu
3	DF	Pak Hye-gyong	7 November 2001 (aged 16)			(DPR Korea Football Association) April 25
4	DF	Ri Kyong-hyang	10 June 1996 (aged 22)			(DPR Korea Football Association) April 25
5	DF	Wi Jong-sim	13 October 1997 (aged 20)			(DPR Korea Football Association) Kalmaegi
15	DF	Kim Nam-hui	4 March 1994 (aged 24)			(DPR Korea Football Association) April 25
16	DF	Kim Un-ha	23 March 1993 (aged 25)			(DPR Korea Football Association) Sobaeksu
17	DF	Son Ok-ju	7 March 2000 (aged 18)			(DPR Korea Football Association) Rimyongsu
6	MF	Ju Hyo-sim	21 June 1998 (aged 20)			(DPR Korea Football Association) April 25
7	MF	Kim Un-hwa	30 September 1992 (aged 25)			(DPR Korea Football Association) Wolmido
8	MF	Yu Jong-im	6 December 1993 (aged 24)			(DPR Korea Football Association) Amrokkang
10	MF	Rim Se-ok	13 January 1994 (aged 24)			
13	MF	Kim Phyong-hwa	28 November 1996 (aged 21)			(DPR Korea Football Association) Sobaeksu
14	MF	Ri Hyang-sim	23 March 1996 (aged 22)			(DPR Korea Football Association) Amrokkang
9	FW	Jang Hyon-sun	1 July 1991 (aged 27)			(DPR Korea Football Association) Wolmido
11	FW	Sung Hyang-sim	2 December 1999 (aged 18)			(DPR Korea Football Association) Pyongyang City
12	FW	Kim Yun-mi	1 July 1993 (aged 25)			(DPR Korea Football Association) Amrokkang
20	FW	Ri Hae-yon	10 January 1999 (aged 19)			(DPR Korea Football Association) April 25

=== Tajikistan ===
The following is the Tajikistan squad in the women's football tournament of the 2018 Asian Games. The team of 18 players was officially named on 13 August.

Head coach: Kanoat Latipov

No.	Pos.	Player	Date of birth (age)	Club
1	GK	Saiyora Saidova	1 February 1998 (aged 20)	(Tajikistan Football Federation) Zeboniso Dushanbe
16	GK	Adolatkhon Komilova	19 November 1997 (aged 20)	(Tajikistan Football Federation) Khatlon Bokhtar
23	GK	Azimzoda Shukronai	29 December 2002 (aged 15)	(Tajikistan Football Federation) Barh Nurak
2	DF	Sakhina Saidova	16 December 1999 (aged 18)	(Tajikistan Football Federation) Khatlon Bokhtar
5	DF	Nasiba Olimova	14 January 1999 (aged 19)	(Tajikistan Football Federation) Barh Nurak
9	DF	Marjona Fayzulloeva	4 September 2000 (aged 17)	(Tajikistan Football Federation) Zeboniso Dushanbe
12	DF	Shakhnoza Boboeva	6 January 2000 (aged 18)	(Tajikistan Football Federation) Khatlon Bokhtar
14	DF	Nodira Mirzoeva	4 October 1994 (aged 23)	(Tajikistan Football Federation) Regar-TadAZ Tursunzoda
18	DF	Shukrona Khojaeva	11 September 2002 (aged 15)	(Tajikistan Football Federation) Zeboniso Dushanbe
21	DF	Jumakhon Shukronai	4 April 1999 (aged 19)	(Tajikistan Football Federation) Swallow Dushanbe
4	MF	Natalia Sotnikova	2 July 1994 (aged 24)	(Tajikistan Football Federation) Swallow Dushanbe
13	MF	Mavjuda Safarova	7 May 1999 (aged 19)	(Tajikistan Football Federation) Khatlon Bokhtar
17	MF	Munisa Mirzoeva	15 December 2000 (aged 17)	(Tajikistan Football Federation) Regar-TadAZ Tursunzoda
19	MF	Sayramjon Kholnazarova	27 August 1999 (aged 18)	(Tajikistan Football Federation) Khatlon Bokhtar
20	MF	Laylo Khalimova	16 November 1997 (aged 20)	(Tajikistan Football Federation) Khatlon Bokhtar
6	FW	Zulaikho Safarova	21 July 2000 (aged 18)	(Tajikistan Football Federation) Regar-TadAZ Tursunzoda
8	FW	Madina Fozilova	1 May 1996 (aged 22)	(Tajikistan Football Federation) Zeboniso Dushanbe
15	FW	Nekubakht Khudododova	23 February 2002 (aged 16)	(Tajikistan Football Federation) Zeboniso Dushanbe

== Group C ==
=== Japan ===
The following is the Japan squad in the women's football tournament of the 2018 Asian Games.

Head coach: (Japan) Asako Takakura

No.	Pos.	Player	Date of birth (age)	Caps	Goals	Club
1	GK	Sakiko Ikeda	8 September 1992 (aged 25)	13	0	(Japan Football Association) Urawa Red Diamonds
18	GK	Ayaka Yamashita	29 September 1995 (aged 22)	20	0	(Japan Football Association) NTV Beleza
2	DF	Risa Shimizu	15 June 1996 (aged 22)	13	0	(Japan Football Association) NTV Beleza
3	DF	Aya Sameshima	16 June 1987 (aged 31)	96	5	(Japan Football Association) INAC Kobe Leonessa
4	DF	Shiori Miyake	13 October 1995 (aged 22)	12	0	(Japan Football Association) INAC Kobe Leonessa
5	DF	Hikari Takagi	21 May 1993 (aged 25)	18	1	(Japan Football Association) Nojima Stella Kanagawa Sagamihara
6	DF	Saori Ariyoshi	1 November 1987 (aged 30)	58	1	(Japan Football Association) NTV Beleza
17	DF	Aimi Kunitake	10 January 1997 (aged 21)	1	0	(Japan Football Association) Nojima Stella Kanagawa Sagamihara
7	MF	Emi Nakajima	27 September 1990 (aged 27)	59	12	(Japan Football Association) INAC Kobe Leonessa
10	MF	Yuka Momiki	9 April 1996 (aged 22)	15	3	(Japan Football Association) NTV Beleza
12	MF	Rika Masuya	14 September 1995 (aged 22)	25	5	(Japan Football Association) INAC Kobe Leonessa
13	MF	Yu Nakasato	14 July 1994 (aged 24)	18	0	(Japan Football Association) NTV Beleza
14	MF	Yui Hasegawa	29 January 1997 (aged 21)	25	3	(Japan Football Association) NTV Beleza
15	MF	Moeno Sakaguchi	4 June 1992 (aged 26)	4	1	(Japan Football Association) Albirex Niigata
16	MF	Rin Sumida	12 January 1996 (aged 22)	17	0	(Japan Football Association) NTV Beleza
8	FW	Mana Iwabuchi	18 March 1993 (aged 25)	56	16	(Japan Football Association) INAC Kobe Leonessa
9	FW	Yuika Sugasawa	5 October 1990 (aged 27)	54	13	(Japan Football Association) Urawa Red Diamonds
11	FW	Mina Tanaka	28 April 1994 (aged 24)	30	12	(Japan Football Association) NTV Beleza

=== Thailand ===
The following is the Thailand squad in the women's football tournament of the 2018 Asian Games. The team of 20 players was officially named on 13 August.

Head coach: Nuengrutai Srathongvian

No.	Pos.	Player	Date of birth (age)	Club
18	GK	Sukanya Chor Charoenying	24 November 1987 (aged 30)	(Football Association of Thailand) Chonburi
22	GK	Nattaruja Muthtanawech	21 August 1996 (aged 21)	(Football Association of Thailand) BG–CAS
2	DF	Kanjanaporn Saenkhun	18 July 1996 (aged 22)	(Football Association of Thailand) BG–CAS
3	DF	Natthakarn Chinwong	15 March 1992 (aged 26)	(Football Association of Thailand) Chonburi
4	DF	Duangnapa Sritala	4 February 1986 (aged 32)	(Football Association of Thailand) Royal Thai Airforce
5	DF	Ainon Phancha	26 January 1992 (aged 26)	(Football Association of Thailand) Chonburi
9	DF	Warunee Phetwiset	13 December 1990 (aged 27)	(Football Association of Thailand) Chonburi
10	DF	Sunisa Srangthaisong	6 May 1988 (aged 29)	(Football Association of Thailand) BTU
6	MF	Pikul Khueanpet	20 September 1988 (aged 29)	(Football Association of Thailand) BG–CAS
7	MF	Silawan Intamee	22 January 1994 (aged 24)	(Football Association of Thailand) Chonburi
11	MF	Alisa Rukpinij	2 February 1995 (aged 23)	(Football Association of Thailand) Chonburi
12	MF	Rattikan Thongsombut	7 July 1991 (aged 26)	(Football Association of Thailand) BG–CAS
13	MF	Orathai Srimanee	12 June 1988 (aged 29)	(Football Association of Thailand) BG–CAS
15	MF	Nipawan Panyosuk	15 March 1995 (aged 23)	(Football Association of Thailand) Chonburi
19	MF	Pitsamai Sornsai	19 January 1989 (aged 29)	(Football Association of Thailand) Chonburi
20	MF	Wilaiporn Boothduang	25 June 1987 (aged 30)	(Football Association of Thailand) Royal Thai Airforce
21	MF	Kanjana Sungngoen	21 September 1986 (aged 31)	(Football Association of Thailand) Chonburi
25	MF	Sudarat Chuchuen	19 June 1997 (aged 21)	(Football Association of Thailand) BTU
8	FW	Suchawadee Nildhamrong	1 April 1997 (aged 21)	(United States Soccer Federation) California Golden Bears
17	FW	Taneekarn Dangda	15 December 1992 (aged 25)	(Football Association of Thailand) Chonburi

=== Vietnam ===
The following is the Vietnam squad in the women's football tournament of the 2018 Asian Games. The team of 20 players was officially named on 11 August.

Head coach: Mai Đức Chung

No.	Pos.	Player	Date of birth (age)	Club
1	GK	Trần Thị Hải Yến	12 September 1998 (aged 19)	(Vietnam Football Federation) Hà Nam
14	GK	Trần Thị Kim Thanh	18 September 1993 (aged 24)	(Vietnam Football Federation) Hồ Chí Minh City
22	GK	Khổng Thị Hằng	10 October 1993 (aged 24)	(Vietnam Football Federation) Than Khoáng Sản
2	DF	Trần Thị Hồng Nhung	28 October 1992 (aged 25)	(Vietnam Football Federation) Hà Nam
3	DF	Chương Thị Kiều	19 August 1995 (aged 22)	(Vietnam Football Federation) Hồ Chí Minh City
4	DF	Nguyễn Thanh Huyền	12 August 1996 (aged 22)	(Vietnam Football Federation) Hà Nội
5	DF	Bùi Thị Thúy	17 July 1998 (aged 20)	(Vietnam Football Federation) Than Khoáng Sản
6	DF	Bùi Thúy An	5 October 1990 (aged 27)	(Vietnam Football Federation) Hà Nội
13	DF	Nguyễn Thị Mỹ Anh	27 November 1994 (aged 23)	(Vietnam Football Federation) Hồ Chí Minh City
15	DF	Phạm Thị Tươi	26 June 1993 (aged 25)	(Vietnam Football Federation) Hà Nam
7	MF	Nguyễn Thị Tuyết Dung	13 December 1993 (aged 24)	(Vietnam Football Federation) Hà Nam
8	MF	Nguyễn Thị Liễu	18 September 1992 (aged 25)	(Vietnam Football Federation) Hà Nam
11	MF	Thái Thị Thảo	12 February 1995 (aged 23)	(Vietnam Football Federation) Hà Nội
17	MF	Đinh Thị Thùy Dung	25 August 1998 (aged 19)	(Vietnam Football Federation) Than Khoáng Sản
18	MF	Nguyễn Thị Vạn	10 January 1997 (aged 21)	(Vietnam Football Federation) Than Khoáng Sản
20	MF	Hà Thị Nhài	15 March 1998 (aged 20)	(Vietnam Football Federation) Than Khoáng Sản
23	MF	Phạm Hoàng Quỳnh	20 September 1992 (aged 25)	(Vietnam Football Federation) Than Khoáng Sản
9	FW	Huỳnh Như	28 November 1991 (aged 26)	(Vietnam Football Federation) Hồ Chí Minh City
12	FW	Phạm Hải Yến	9 November 1994 (aged 23)	(Vietnam Football Federation) Hà Nội
21	FW	Nguyễn Thị Thúy Hằng	19 November 1997 (aged 20)	(Vietnam Football Federation) Than Khoáng Sản

== See also ==
- Football at the 2018 Asian Games – Men's team squads
