= 2016 Lunar New Year Cup =

猴年賀歲盃
Hong Kong national football team	Hong Kong League XI
0	4
- Date: 25 January 2016
- Venue: Mongkok Stadium, Hong Kong
- Referee: Lau Fong Hei
- Attendance: 6,296
- Weather: 20˚C

The 90th 2016 Lunar New Year Cup (Chinese: 猴年賀歲盃; lit. 'Year of the Monkey Celebrate New Year Cup'), is the annual football event held in Hong Kong to celebrate Chinese New Year. The event was held by the Hong Kong Football Association. 3 matches were played.

== Teams ==
All teams came from Hong Kong this year.

First match (40 minutes):

- Hong Kong Women 80s
- Hong Kong Women 90s

Second match (40 minutes):

- Hong Kong Classics
- Foreign Player Classics

Final match (90 minutes):

- Hong Kong Representative Team
- Hong Kong League XI

== Squads ==
=== Hong Kong Women 80s ===
- Team manager: Mr. Eric Fok
- Head coach: Chan Shuk Chi
- Assistant coach: Lam Siu Ying
- Technical Staff: Lai Ka Shing

No.	Pos.	Player	Date of birth (age)	Club
1	GK	(Hong Kong) Fong Kit Lun		(Hong Kong) Eastern
2	DF	(Hong Kong) Pak Yee Kwan		(Hong Kong) Shatin
3	DF	(Hong Kong) Ng Po Lam Pauline		(Hong Kong) Club One
4	MF	(Hong Kong) Ng Wing Kum		(Hong Kong) Citizen
5	MF	(Hong Kong) Chu Ling Ling		(Hong Kong) Citizen
6	MF	(Hong Kong) Chan Wing Sze		(Hong Kong) Citizen
7	FW	(Hong Kong) Kwong Wing Yan		(Hong Kong) Club One
9	FW	(Hong Kong) Chun Ching Hang		(Hong Kong) Club One
10	MF	(Hong Kong) Wong Ka Man		(Hong Kong) Club One
11	DF	(Hong Kong) Po Ching Ying		(Hong Kong) Club One
12	FW	(Hong Kong) Wong Shuk Fan		(Hong Kong) Citizen
13	DF	(Hong Kong) Lam Kan Yu		(Hong Kong) Club One
18	GK	(Hong Kong) Leung Wai Nga		(Hong Kong) Club One
19	GK	(Hong Kong) Lung Wing Yan		(Hong Kong) Citizen
20	FW	(Hong Kong) Yiu Ka Wai		(Hong Kong) Citizen
21	DF	(Hong Kong) Lau Hoi Yan		(Hong Kong) Shatin

=== Hong Kong Women 90s ===
- Team manager: Mrs. Josephine Mark Lee
- Head coach: Wong Yeuk Ling Betty
- Assistant coach: Lee Mei Fan, Ip Yik Wing
- Technical Staff: Mak Chin Wai

No.	Pos.	Player	Date of birth (age)	Club
1	GK	(Hong Kong) Ng Yuen Ki		Chelsea FC Soccer School (Hong Kong)
2	DF	(Hong Kong) Ip Yuen Man		(Hong Kong) Tai Po
3	DF	(Hong Kong) Ma Chak Shun		Chelsea FC Soccer School (Hong Kong)
4	DF	(Hong Kong) Lau Yun Yi		(Hong Kong) Citizen
6	MF	(Hong Kong) Lau Yui Ching		(Hong Kong) Club One
7	FW	(Hong Kong) Kung Yuet Charis		(Hong Kong) Shatin
8	FW	(Hong Kong) Chung Pui Ki		Chelsea FC Soccer School (Hong Kong)
9	MF	(Hong Kong) Kwok Ching Man		(Hong Kong) Citizen
10	MF	(Hong Kong) Lee Wing Yan		Chelsea FC Soccer School (Hong Kong)
11	FW	(Hong Kong) Chan Tsz Yan		Chelsea FC Soccer School (Hong Kong)
12	MF	(Hong Kong) Wai Yuen Ting		(Hong Kong) Citizen
13	DF	(Hong Kong) Ip Yuen Tung		(Hong Kong) Citizen
14	MF	(Hong Kong) Yiu Hei Man		Chelsea FC Soccer School (Hong Kong)
15	FW	(Hong Kong) Yuen Hoi Dik Heidi		(Hong Kong) Citizen
16	DF	(Hong Kong) Wong So Han		Chelsea FC Soccer School (Hong Kong)
17	FW	(Hong Kong) Cheung Wai Ki		(Hong Kong) Citizen
18	GK	(Hong Kong) Ng Cheuk Wai		Chelsea FC Soccer School (Hong Kong)
20	MF	(Hong Kong) Ma Hiu Wai		(Hong Kong) Shatin

=== Hong Kong Classics ===
- Team manager: Mr. Lawrence Yu Kam-kee, Mr. Brian Leung Hung-tak
- Coach: Kwok Ka Ming, Wong Man Wai
- Assistant: Philip Lee Fai-lup

No.	Pos.	Player	Date of birth (age)	Club
1	GK	(Hong Kong) Chan Shu Ming	27 September 1959 (aged 56)	
2		(Hong Kong) Pang Kam Chuen		
3		(Hong Kong) Yu Kwok Sum		
4		(Hong Kong) Tam Ah Fook		
5		(Hong Kong) Lai Law Kau		
6		(Hong Kong) Ku Kam Fai	27 January 1961 (aged 55)	
7		(Hong Kong) Au Wai Lun	14 August 1971 (aged 44)	
8		(Hong Kong) Chan Fat Chi	10 January 1957 (aged 59)	
9		(Hong Kong) Sze Wai Shan		
10		(Hong Kong) Leslie Santos	20 July 1967 (aged 48)	
11		(Hong Kong) Lee Kin Wo	20 October 1967 (aged 48)	
12		(Hong Kong) Chiu Chung Man	7 October 1969 (aged 46)	
13		(Hong Kong) Tam Siu Wai	17 September 1970 (aged 45)	
14		(Hong Kong) Cheung Chi Tak	15 September 1958 (aged 57)	
15		(Hong Kong) Lo Kai Wah	27 January 1971 (aged 45)	
16		(Hong Kong) Shum Kwok Pui	17 August 1970 (aged 45)	
17		(Hong Kong) Chan Chi Kwong	19 October 1964 (aged 51)	
18	GK	(Hong Kong) Shing Wai Luen		

=== Foreign Player Classics ===
- Team manager: Mr. Samuel Choi Lin-hung, Mr. Chow Man Kit
- Coach: Anílton da Conceição, Tim Bredbury

No.	Pos.	Player	Date of birth (age)	Club
1	GK	(Macau) Domingos Chan	11 September 1970 (aged 45)	
2		(England) Mark Grainger		
3		(Hong Kong) Lawrence Akandu	10 December 1974 (aged 41)	
4		(Brazil) José Ricardo Rambo	17 August 1971 (aged 44)	
5		(Hong Kong) Cristiano Cordeiro	14 August 1973 (aged 42)	
6		(Netherlands) Marlon Van Der Sander		
7		(Nigeria) Cornelius Udebuluzor	27 August 1974 (aged 41)	
8		(Hong Kong) Choi Lin Hung		
9		(Australia) Paul Foster	28 December 1967 (aged 48)	
10		(Spain) Roberto Losada	25 October 1976 (aged 39)	
11		(South Korea) Kim Pan-gon	1 May 1969 (aged 46)	
12		(Brazil) Eder Jose De Lima Ferreira	17 June 1974 (aged 41)	
13		(Bosnia and Herzegovina) Anto Grabo	7 December 1960 (aged 55)	
14		(Nepal) Bikas Gurung	28 September 1965 (aged 50)	
15		(Brazil) Detinho	11 September 1973 (aged 42)	
16		(Brazil) Fábio Lopes Alcântara	24 March 1978 (aged 37)	
17		(Brazil) Paulo Henrique Miranda	21 February 1972 (aged 43)	
18		(Hong Kong) Chow Man Kit		

=== Hong Kong Representative Team ===
- Honorary Team Managers: Mr. Peter Mok Yiu-keung, Mr. Chim Pui Chung
- Coach: Kim Pan-gon

No.	Pos.	Player	Date of birth (age)	Club
2	DF	(Hong Kong) Lee Chi Ho	16 November 1982 (aged 33)	(China) Meizhou Kejia
3	DF	(Hong Kong) Chan Hin Kwong	27 February 1988 (aged 27)	(Hong Kong) Yuen Long
4	DF	(Hong Kong) Wong Tsz Ho	7 March 1994 (aged 21)	(Hong Kong) Dreams Metro Gallery
5	DF	(Hong Kong) Jean-Jacques Kilama	13 October 1985 (aged 30)	(China) Tianjin Quanjian
6	MF	(Hong Kong) Tan Chun Lok	15 January 1996 (aged 20)	Hong Kong Pegasus
7	MF	(Hong Kong) Lee Ka Yiu	10 April 1992 (aged 23)	Hong Kong Pegasus
8	FW	(Hong Kong) Wong Wai	27 August 1992 (aged 23)	Hong Kong Pegasus
9	FW	(Hong Kong) Christian Annan	3 May 1978 (aged 37)	(Hong Kong) Kitchee
10	MF	(Hong Kong) Lam Ka Wai	5 June 1985 (aged 30)	(Hong Kong) Kitchee
11	MF	(Hong Kong) Itaparica	8 July 1980 (aged 35)	(China) Xinjiang Tianshan Leopard
12	DF	(Hong Kong) Lo Kwan Yee	9 October 1984 (aged 31)	(Hong Kong) Kitchee
13	FW	(Hong Kong) Hui Ka Lok	5 January 1994 (aged 22)	(Hong Kong) Biu Chun Rangers
14	DF	(Hong Kong) Jack Sealy	4 May 1987 (aged 28)	(China) Changchun Yatai
15	DF	(Hong Kong) Chan Wai Ho	24 April 1982 (aged 33)	(Hong Kong) South China
16	MF	(Hong Kong) Emmet Wan	13 March 1993 (aged 22)	(Hong Kong) Kwoon Chung Southern
17	FW	(Hong Kong) Lo Kong Wai	19 June 1992 (aged 23)	Hong Kong Pegasus
18	GK	(Hong Kong) Tse Tak Him	10 February 1985 (aged 30)	(Hong Kong) Kwoon Chung Southern
19	GK	(Hong Kong) Wang Zhenpeng	5 May 1984 (aged 31)	(Hong Kong) Kitchee

=== Hong Kong League XI ===
- Honorary Team Managers: Mr. Pui Kwan Kay, Ms. Canny Leung Tsz-shan
- Coach: José Ricardo Rambo
- Assistant: Kwok Kar Lok Kenneth, Law Kwok Ho

No.	Pos.	Player	Date of birth (age)	Club
1	GK	(North Macedonia) Kristijan Naumovski	17 September 1988 (aged 27)	Hong Kong Pegasus
2	DF	(Spain) Dani Cancela	23 September 1981 (aged 34)	(Hong Kong) Kitchee
3	DF	(Brazil) Eduardo Praes	3 November 1988 (aged 27)	Hong Kong Pegasus
4	DF	(England) Andy Russell	21 November 1987 (aged 28)	(Hong Kong) South China
5	DF	(Brazil) Mauricio	7 May 1987 (aged 28)	(Hong Kong) Biu Chun Rangers
6	MF	(Spain) José María Díaz Muñoz	4 July 1982 (aged 33)	(Hong Kong) Kwoon Chung Southern
7	FW	(Brazil) Fernando Augusto Azevedo Pedreira	14 November 1986 (aged 29)	(Hong Kong) Kitchee
8	FW	(Montenegro) Admir Adrović	8 May 1988 (aged 27)	Hong Kong Pegasus
9	MF	(Spain) Dieguito	6 January 1983 (aged 33)	(Hong Kong) Biu Chun Rangers
10	MF	(Brazil) João Emir Porto Pereira	17 March 1989 (aged 26)	Hong Kong Pegasus
11	FW	(Brazil) Wellingsson de Souza	7 September 1989 (aged 26)	(Hong Kong) Kwoon Chung Southern
12	MF	(South Korea) Yoon Dong-hun	2 May 1983 (aged 32)	(Hong Kong) Glory Sky Wong Tai Sin
13	DF	(Brazil) Luciano Silva da Silva	13 June 1987 (aged 28)	(Hong Kong) Yuen Long
14	FW	(Japan) Kenji Fukuda	21 October 1977 (aged 38)	(Hong Kong) Dreams Metro Gallery
15	DF	(Brazil) Roberto Fronza	10 July 1984 (aged 31)	(Hong Kong) Biu Chun Rangers
17	GK	(Brazil) Paulo César da Silva Argolo	27 March 1986 (aged 29)	(Hong Kong) Biu Chun Rangers
18	MF	(Spain) Jordi Tarrés	16 March 1981 (aged 34)	(Hong Kong) Kitchee
19	MF	(Brazil) Dhiego de Souza Martins	27 August 1988 (aged 27)	Hong Kong Pegasus

== Results ==
=== First match ===
25 January 2016
13:30 UTC+8

Hong Kong Women 80s	0–3	Hong Kong Women 90s
	Report	Cheung Wai Ki 4', 14'; Chung Pui Ki 31'

Mongkok Stadium, Hong Kong
Attendance: 6,296

=== Second match ===
25 January 2016
14:30 UTC+8

Hong Kong Classics	1–4	Foreign Player Classics
Tam Siu Wai 38'	Report	Fábio 16'; Detinho 31'; Collins 32'; Eder 37'

Mongkok Stadium, Hong Kong
Attendance: 6,296

=== Final match ===
25 January 2016
16:00 UTC+8

Hong Kong national football team	0–4	Hong Kong League XI
	Report	Fukuda 20'; Dhiego 35'; Fernando 60'; Adrović 80'

Mongkok Stadium, Hong Kong
Attendance: 6,296
Referee: Lau Fong Hei
