= 2018 Chinese FA Women's Super Cup =

Dalian Quanjian	Jiangsu Suning
1	0
- Date: 10 November 2018
- Venue: Dujiangyan Phoenix Stadium, Dujiangyan
- Referee: Rong Qi

The Dongfeng Renault 2018 Chinese FA Women's Super Cup (Chinese: 东风雷诺2018中国足协女子超级杯) was the 17th Chinese FA Women's Super Cup, an annual football match contested by the winners of the previous season's Chinese Women's Super League and Chinese Women's Football Championship. The match was contested at the Dujiangyan Phoenix Stadium by 2018 Chinese Women's Football Championship winners Jiangsu Suning, and Dalian Quanjian, champions of the 2018 Chinese Women's Super League, on 10 November 2018.

== Match ==
=== Details ===
10 November 2018
15:00

Dalian Quanjian	1–0	Jiangsu Suning
Sole Jaimes 31'	Report

Dujiangyan Phoenix Stadium, Dujiangyan
Referee: Rong Qi
