= 2018 Lunar New Year Cup =

狗年賀歲盃
Hong Kong Representative Team	Hong Kong League XI
3	4
- Date: 3 February 2018
- Venue: Mongkok Stadium, Hong Kong
- Attendance: 4,239
- Weather: 22˚C

The 92nd 2018 Lunar New Year Cup (Chinese: 狗年賀歲盃; lit. 'Year of the Dog Celebrate New Year Cup') was the annual football event held in Hong Kong to celebrate Chinese New Year. The event was held by the Hong Kong Football Association. 2matches were played.

== Teams ==
First match (90 minutes):

- Hong Kong Women's Representative Team
- Nepal Armed Police Force

Final match (90 minutes):

- Hong Kong Representative Team
- Hong Kong League XI

== Squads ==
=== Hong Kong Women's Representative Team ===
Manager: (Brazil) José Ricardo Rambo

No.	Pos.	Player	Date of birth (age)	Caps	Club
1	GK	(Hong Kong) Leung Wai Nga	24 August 1988 (aged 29)		(Hong Kong) Kitchee SC
2	DF	(Hong Kong) Chung Pui Ki			(Hong Kong) Kitchee FC
3	DF	(Hong Kong) Ho Wan Tung	29 May 1996 (aged 21)		(Hong Kong) Kitchee SC
4	MF	(Hong Kong) Yiu Hei Man	22 September 1990 (aged 27)		(Hong Kong) Happy Valley AA
5	MF	(Hong Kong) Lau Yui Ching	15 August 1994 (aged 23)		(Hong Kong) Kitchee SC
6	MF	(Hong Kong) Chan Wing Sze (captain)	11 September 1983 (aged 34)		(Hong Kong) Citizen AA
8	MF	(Hong Kong) Ng Wing Kum	6 May 1984 (aged 33)		(Hong Kong) Citizen AA
9	MF	(Hong Kong) Wai Yuen Ting	15 October 1992 (aged 25)		(Hong Kong) Citizen AA
11	FW	(Hong Kong) Chun Ching Hang			(Hong Kong) Kitchee SC
12	FW	(Hong Kong) Kay Fung			(Hong Kong) Citizen AA
13	DF	(Hong Kong) Ma Chak Shun			(Hong Kong) Happy Valley AA
15	FW	(Hong Kong) Heidi Yuen	22 August 1992 (aged 25)		(Hong Kong) Citizen AA
16	DF	(Hong Kong) Wong So Han	16 November 1991 (aged 26)		(Hong Kong) Happy Valley AA
17	DF	(Hong Kong) Kwok Ching Man	27 June 1993 (aged 24)		(Hong Kong) Citizen AA
18	GK	(Hong Kong) Ng Cheuk Wai	19 March 1997 (aged 20)		(Hong Kong) Happy Valley AA
20	FW	(Hong Kong) Lee Wing Yan	28 April 1997 (aged 20)		(Hong Kong) Happy Valley AA
21	DF	(Hong Kong) Sharon Fung			(Hong Kong) Chelsea FC Soccer School
22	FW	(Hong Kong) So Hoi Lam			(Hong Kong) Happy Valley AA
23	FW	(Hong Kong) Ho Mui Mei			(Hong Kong) Citizen AA
24	MF	(Hong Kong) Cham Ching Man			(Hong Kong) Happy Valley AA

=== Armed Police Force of Nepal (Women) ===
Manager: (Nepal)

No.	Pos.	Player	Date of birth (age)	Caps	Club
1	GK	(Nepal) Rupa Rana Magar			(Nepal) APF Club
3		(Nepal) Nisha Thokari			(Nepal) APF Club
4		(Nepal) Hira Kumari Bhujel			(Nepal) APF Club
5		(Nepal) Srijana Chemjong			(Nepal) APF Club
6		(Nepal) Manmaya Limbu			(Nepal) APF Club
7		(Nepal) Renuka Nagarkoti			(Nepal) APF Club
9		(Nepal) Sabitra Bhandari			(Nepal) APF Club
10		(Nepal) Anita K.C.			(Nepal) APF Club
11		(Nepal) Anita Basnet			(Nepal) APF Club
12		(Nepal) Gita Rana			(Nepal) APF Club
14		(Nepal) Rekha Poudel			(Nepal) APF Club
17		(Nepal) Manjali Kumari Yonjan			(Nepal) APF Club
19		(Nepal) Ranjana Darji (Captain)			(Nepal) APF Club
22	GK	(Nepal) Anjila Tumbapo Subba			(Nepal) APF Club
27		(Nepal) Saru Limbu			(Nepal) APF Club

=== Hong Kong Representative Team ===
Manager: (Hong Kong) Liu Chun Fai

No.	Pos.	Player	Date of birth (age)	Caps	Club
1	GK	(Hong Kong) Yuen Ho Chun	19 July 1995 (aged 22)		Hong Kong Rangers FC
3	DF	(Hong Kong) Wong Chun Ho	31 May 1990 (aged 27)		Hong Kong Rangers FC
4	DF	(Hong Kong) Cheung Chi Yung (Captain)	30 June 1989 (aged 28)		Hong Kong Rangers FC
5	DF	(Hong Kong) Leung Nok Hang	14 November 1994 (aged 23)		Hong Kong Rangers FC
6	DF	(Hong Kong) Yeung Chi Lun	20 November 1989 (aged 28)		Hong Kong Rangers FC
7	FW	(Hong Kong) Lau Chi Lok	15 March 1993 (aged 24)		Hong Kong Rangers FC
8	MF	(Hong Kong) Lau Ho Lam	22 January 1993 (aged 25)		(Hong Kong) Yuen Long FC
9	FW	(Hong Kong) Lo Kong Wai	19 June 1992 (aged 25)		(Hong Kong) Eastern
11	DF	(Hong Kong) Wong Tsz Ho	7 March 1994 (aged 23)		(Hong Kong) Eastern
12	FW	(Hong Kong) Lai Lok Yin	20 July 1995 (aged 22)		Hong Kong Rangers FC
14	DF	(Hong Kong) Fong Pak Lun	14 April 1993 (aged 24)		Hong Kong Rangers FC
15	MF	(Hong Kong) Lau Hok Ming	19 October 1995 (aged 22)		(Hong Kong) Southern District FC
16	DF	(Hong Kong) Lam Hin Ting	9 December 1999 (aged 18)		(Hong Kong) Dreams FC
17	FW	(Hong Kong) Cheng Siu Kwan	13 January 1997 (aged 21)		Hong Kong Rangers FC
18	GK	(Hong Kong) Chan Ka Ho	27 January 1996 (aged 22)		(Hong Kong) Yuen Long FC
21	MF	(Hong Kong) Tse Long Hin	6 February 1995 (aged 23)		(Hong Kong) Lee Man F.C.
22	MF	(Hong Kong) Wu Chun Ming	21 November 1997 (aged 20)		Hong Kong Rangers FC

=== Hong Kong League XI ===
Manager: (Hong Kong) Kwok Kar Lok

No.	Pos.	Player	Date of birth (age)	Caps	Club
1	GK	(Hong Kong) Felix Luk	7 May 1994 (aged 23)		(Hong Kong) Lee Man F.C.
3	DF	(New Zealand) Shay Spitz	27 January 1988 (aged 30)		(Hong Kong) Southern District FC
4	DF	(Serbia) Igor Miović	31 March 1986 (aged 31)		Hong Kong Rangers FC
5	DF	(Spain) Pablo Gallardo	19 February 1986 (aged 32)		(Hong Kong) Dreams FC
6	DF	(Brazil) Luciano Silva da Silva	13 June 1987 (aged 30)		(Hong Kong) Lee Man F.C.
7	MF	(Brazil) Ticão	7 February 1985 (aged 33)		(Hong Kong) Yuen Long FC
8	MF	(Brazil) Zé Victor	8 March 1990 (aged 27)		(Hong Kong) Lee Man F.C.
9	FW	(Serbia) Nikola Komazec	15 November 1987 (aged 30)		Hong Kong Pegasus FC
10	MF	(Brazil) João Emir Porto Pereira	17 March 1989 (aged 28)		Hong Kong Pegasus FC
11	FW	(Brazil) Giovane Alves da Silva	25 November 1982 (aged 35)		(China) R&F
12	DF	(South Korea) Yoon Dong-hun	2 May 1983 (aged 34)		(Hong Kong) Dreams FC
13	FW	(Australia) Travis Major	18 February 1990 (aged 28)		Hong Kong Pegasus FC
14	MF	(Brazil) Wellingsson de Souza	7 September 1989 (aged 28)		(Hong Kong) Southern District FC
15	DF	(South Korea) Kim Dong-jin	29 January 1982 (aged 36)		(Hong Kong) Kitchee SC
18	GK	(Hong Kong) Tse Ka Wing	4 September 1999 (aged 18)		(Hong Kong) Dreams FC
20	FW	(Brazil) Everton Camargo	25 May 1991 (aged 26)		(Hong Kong) Yuen Long FC
21	FW	(Brazil) Lucas Espindola da Silva	6 May 1990 (aged 27)		(Hong Kong) Kitchee SC
22	DF	(Brazil) Fábio Lopes Alcântara (Captain)	29 January 1982 (aged 36)		(Hong Kong) Yuen Long FC

== Results ==
=== First match ===
3 February 2018
13:30 UTC+8

Hong Kong Women's Representative Team	1–3	Nepal Armed Police Force
Ho Mui Mei 53'	Report	Yonjan 22'; Sabitra 61', 83'

Mongkok Stadium, Hong Kong
Attendance: 4,239

=== Final match ===
3 February 2018
16:00 UTC+8

Hong Kong Representative Team	3–4	Hong Kong League XI
Cheung Chi Yung 3'; Lau Ho Lam 60'; Lau Chi Lok 89'	Report	Giovane 45+1'; Ticão 52'; Travis 57'; Wellingsson 85'

Mongkok Stadium, Hong Kong
Attendance: 4,239
