= Sigurður Ragnar Eyjólfsson =

Icelandic footballer and manager

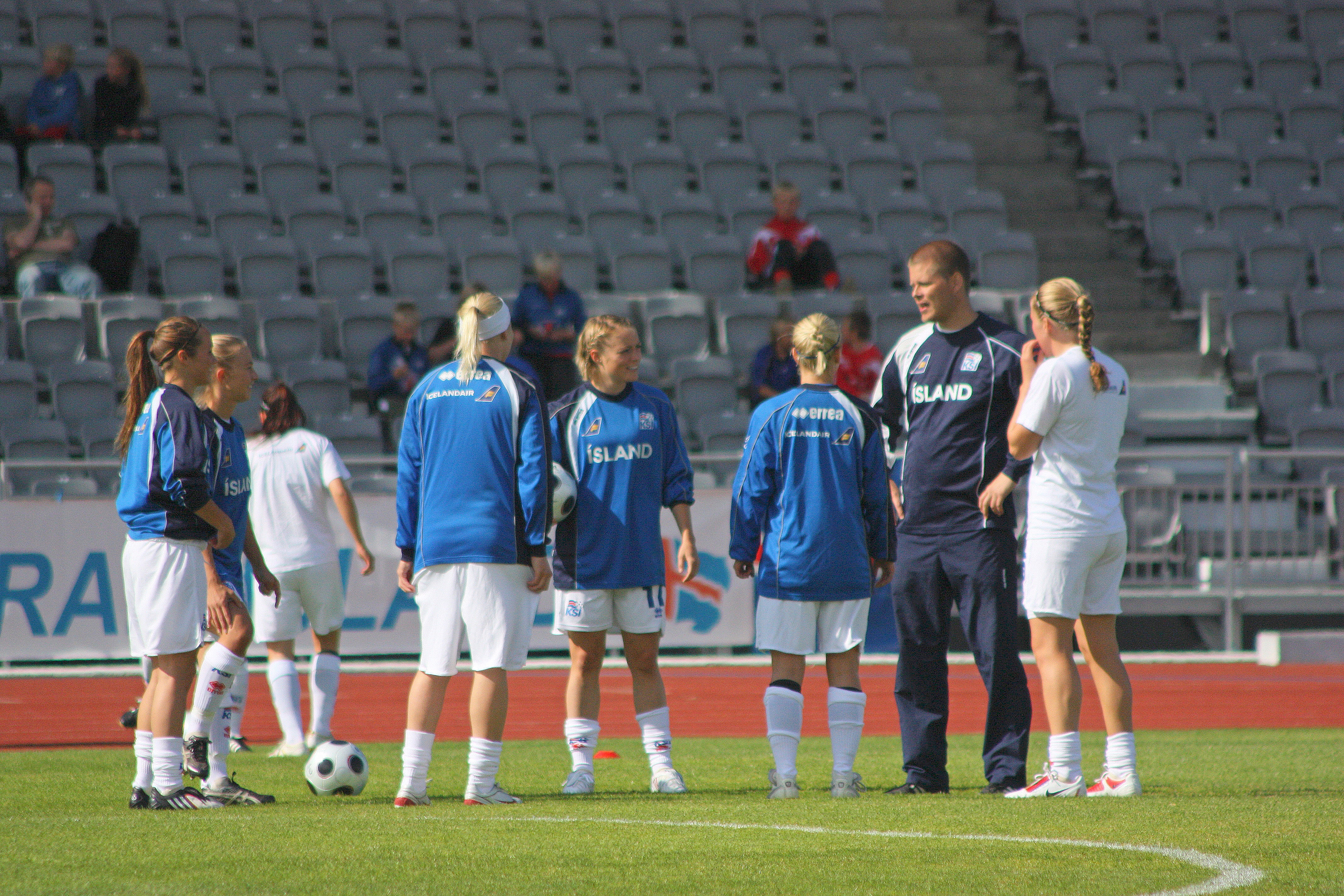
- Sigurður with women's national team players in 2009

Personal information
- Full name: Sigurður Ragnar Eyjólfsson
- Date of birth: 1 December 1973 (age 52)
- Place of birth: Reykjavík, Iceland
- Height: 1.90 m (6 ft 3 in)
- Position: Striker

Team information
- Current team: NSÍ Runavík (manager)

College career
Years	Team	Apps	(Gls)
1995–1998	UNC Greensboro Spartans	87	(75)

Senior career*
Years	Team	Apps	(Gls)
1992–1994	KR	20	(1)
1995–1996	Víkingur R.	20	(6)
1997	Þróttur R.	13	(4)
1998–1999	ÍA	18	(8)
1999–2000	Walsall	23	(2)
2000	→ Chester City (loan)	9	(3)
2000–2001	KRC Harelbeke	9	(2)
2002–2004	KR	43	(17)
2005	ÍA	15	(5)

International career
1991	Iceland U19	2	(0)

Managerial career
- 2006–2013: Iceland (women)
- 2014: ÍBV (men)
- 2014–2016: Lillestrøm (men, assistant)
- 2017: Jiangsu Suning (women)
- 2017–2018: China (women)
- 2020–2023: Keflavík (men)
- 2025–: NSÍ Runavík (men)
- * Club domestic league appearances and goals

Sigurður "Siggi" Ragnar Eyjólfsson (born 1 December 1973) is an Icelandic professional football manager and former player who played as a striker, currently managing Faroe Islands Premier League club NSÍ Runavík.

== Playing career ==
Sigurður secured his place in Walsall history by scoring the third goal in the team's 3–1 win over Oldham Athletic in 1999, to secure promotion to the second tier of English football.

== Managerial career ==
From 2007 until 2013, he served as the head coach of the Iceland women's national team, guiding them to the 2009 and 2013 editions of the UEFA Women's Championship.

In August 2013, Sigurður resigned as coach of Iceland's women's team after seven years. He continued in his role as head of education at the Football Association of Iceland (KSÍ) and was looking to move into coaching men's football.

In January 2017, Sigurður joined Chinese side Jiangsu Suning as head coach of their women's team. He was then appointed as the coach of the China women's national team in November.

== Honours ==
=== Player ===
KR

- Úrvalsdeild: 2002, 2003

Individual

- UNCG Athletics Hall of fame, 2008

=== Managerial ===
Jiangsu Suning (women)

- Chinese FA Women's Cup: 2017

NSÍ Runavík

- Faroe Islands Premier League: 2026
