= 2024 Lunar New Year Cup =

Chinese New Year Cup 2024
FWD富衛保險賀歲盃2024
World Legends	Hong Kong Legends
7	3
- Date: 13 February 2024
- Venue: Hong Kong Stadium, Hong Kong
- Referee: Liu Kwok Man
- Attendance: 20,340

The FWD Insurance Chinese New Year Cup 2024 (Chinese: FWD富衛保險賀歲盃2024) was the annual edition of the Lunar New Year Cup, held in Hong Kong to celebrate the Lunar New Year in February 2024. The event was sponsored by FWD Insurance, organised by ProEvents, and co-organised by The Football Association of Hong Kong, China.

== Teams ==
- World Legends
- Hong Kong Legends

== Squads ==
=== World Legends ===
No.	Pos.	Player	Date of birth (age)	Club
1	GK	(England) David James	1 August 1970 (aged 53)	
12	GK	(Brazil) Júlio César	3 September 1979 (aged 44)	
4	DF	(Finland) Sami Hyypiä	7 October 1973 (aged 50)	
5	DF	(Spain) Carles Puyol	13 April 1978 (aged 45)	
16	DF	(Portugal) Ricardo Carvalho	18 May 1978 (aged 45)	
23	DF	(Italy) Marco Materazzi	19 August 1973 (aged 50)	
27	DF	(France) Mikaël Silvestre	9 August 1977 (aged 46)	
6	MF	(Spain) Gaizka Mendieta	27 March 1974 (aged 49)	
8	MF	(France) Robert Pires	29 October 1973 (aged 50)	
14	MF	(Argentina) Juan Sebastián Verón	9 March 1975 (aged 48)	
18	MF	(Netherlands) Wesley Sneijder	9 June 1984 (aged 39)	
30	MF	(Portugal) Tiago Mendes	2 May 1981 (aged 42)	
7	FW	(Spain) David Villa	3 December 1981 (aged 42)	
9	FW	(Spain) Fernando Morientes	5 April 1976 (aged 47)	
10	FW	(Italy) Alessandro Del Piero	9 November 1974 (aged 49)	
11	FW	(Brazil) Rivaldo	19 April 1972 (aged 51)	
20	FW	(Italy) Francesco Totti	27 September 1976 (aged 47)	

=== Hong Kong Legends ===
No.	Pos.	Player	Date of birth (age)	Club
1	GK	(Hong Kong) Yapp Hung Fai	21 March 1990 (aged 33)	(Football Association of Hong Kong, China) Eastern
19	GK	(Hong Kong) Fan Chun Yip	1 May 1976 (aged 47)	
3	DF	(Hong Kong) Cristiano Cordeiro	14 August 1973 (aged 50)	
18	DF	(Hong Kong) Lee Wai Man	18 August 1973 (aged 50)	
21	DF	(Hong Kong) Man Pei Tak	16 February 1982 (aged 41)	
24	DF	(Hong Kong) Chan Wai Ho	24 April 1982 (aged 41)	(Football Association of Hong Kong, China) Eastern District
33	DF	(Hong Kong) So Wai Chuen	26 March 1988 (aged 35)	
88	DF	(Hong Kong) Tong Kin Man	10 January 1985 (aged 39)	
6	MF	(Hong Kong) Leung Chun Pong	1 October 1986 (aged 37)	(Football Association of Hong Kong, China) Eastern
10	MF	(Hong Kong) Leslie Santos	20 July 1967 (aged 56)	
11	MF	(Hong Kong) Lee Kin Wo	20 October 1967 (aged 56)	
13	MF	(Hong Kong) Chan Chi Hong	20 October 1976 (aged 47)	
17	MF	(Hong Kong) Lee Hong Lim	29 September 1983 (aged 40)	(Football Association of Hong Kong, China) Central & Western District
23	MF	(Hong Kong) Chu Siu Kei	11 January 1980 (aged 44)	
7	FW	(Hong Kong) Au Wai Lun	14 August 1971 (aged 52)	
8	FW	(Hong Kong) Christian Annan	3 May 1978 (aged 45)	(Football Association of Hong Kong, China) Central & Western District
1+6	FW	(Hong Kong) Chan Siu Ki	14 July 1985 (aged 38)	(Football Association of Hong Kong, China) Eastern District
89	FW	(Hong Kong) Au Yeung Yiu Chung	11 July 1989 (aged 34)	(Football Association of Hong Kong, China) Rangers

== Results ==
13 February 2024
17:00 UTC+8

World Legends	7–3	Hong Kong Legends
Rivaldo 10', 45+1'; Totti 21'; Mendieta 27'; Villa 63', 79'; Pires 75'	Report	Leung Chun Pong 55'; Lee Hong Lim 75'; Annan 90+1'

Hong Kong Stadium, Hong Kong
Attendance: 20,340
Referee: Liu Kwok Man
