= 2003 Lunar New Year Cup =

Tournament details
- Host country: Hong Kong
- Dates: 17 – 20 February
- Teams: 4
- Venue: 1 (in 1 host city)

Final positions
- Champions: Uruguay (1st title)

Tournament statistics
- Matches played: 4
- Goals scored: 9 (2.25 per match)
- Top scorer: 8 players

The 2003 Lunar New Year Cup (a.k.a. Carlsberg Cup) was a football tournament held in Hong Kong over the first and fourth day of the Chinese New Year holiday (17 February 2003 and 20 February 2003).

== Participating teams ==
- Denmark League XI
- Hong Kong XI (host)
- Iran
- Uruguay

== Squads ==
Some of the players include:

=== Hong Kong XI ===
- Coach: Kwok Ka Ming

No.	Pos.	Player	Date of birth (age)	Caps	Club
19	GK	(Hong Kong) Fan Chun Yip	2 May 1976 (aged 26)		(Hong Kong) Happy Valley
2	DF	(Hong Kong) Yau Kin Wai	4 January 1973 (aged 30)		(Hong Kong) South China
20	DF	(Hong Kong) Poon Yiu Cheuk	19 September 1977 (aged 25)		(Hong Kong) Happy Valley
25	DF	(Brazil) Cristiano Cordeiro	14 August 1973 (aged 29)		(Hong Kong) Sun Hei
	DF	(Hong Kong) Szeto Man Chun	5 June 1975 (aged 27)		(Hong Kong) South China
	DF	(Hong Kong) Chan Wai Ho	24 April 1982 (aged 20)		(Hong Kong) Buler Rangers
	DF	(Hong Kong) Leung Chi Wing	29 April 1978 (aged 24)		(Hong Kong) Buler Rangers
	DF	(Hong Kong) Ng Wai Chiu	22 October 1981 (aged 21)		(China) Guangzhou Xiangxue
3	MF	(Nigeria) Gerard Guy Ambassa	21 September 1978 (aged 24)		(Hong Kong) Happy Valley
	MF	(Hong Kong) Lee Kin Wo	20 October 1967 (aged 35)		(Hong Kong) Sun Hei
22	MF	(Brazil) José Ricardo Rambo	17 August 1971 (aged 31)		(Hong Kong) Sun Hei
23	MF	(Serbia and Montenegro) Dejan Antonić	22 January 1969 (aged 34)		(Hong Kong) Sun Hei
	MF	(South Korea) Kim Pan-Gon	1 May 1969 (aged 33)		(Hong Kong) Double Flower
28	MF	(Hong Kong) Chan Chi Hong	20 October 1976 (aged 26)		(Hong Kong) South China
	MF	(Hong Kong) Lo Chi Kwan	18 March 1981 (aged 21)		(Hong Kong) Sun Hei
21	FW	(Indonesia) Rochy Putiray	26 June 1970 (aged 32)		(Hong Kong) South China
27	FW	(Brazil) Marcio Gabriel Anacleto			(Hong Kong)
26	FW	(Nigeria) Cornelius Udebuluzor	27 August 1974 (aged 28)		(Hong Kong) Sun Hei

=== Iran ===
- Coach: Homayoun Shahrokhi

No.	Pos.	Player	Date of birth (age)	Caps	Club
1	GK	Ebrahim Mirzapour	16 September 1978 (aged 24)		(Iran) Foolad F.C.
2	MF	Mehdi Amirabadi	22 February 1979 (aged 23)		(Iran) Saipa F.C.
4	DF	Yahya Golmohammadi (captain)	19 March 1971 (aged 31)		(Iran) Persepolis F.C.
6	MF	Javad Nekounam	7 September 1980 (aged 22)		(Iran) PAS Tehran F.C.
7	MF	Hamed Kavianpour	1 December 1978 (aged 24)		(United Arab Emirates) Al Wasl FC
8	MF	Alireza Vahedi Nikbakht	30 June 1980 (aged 22)		(Iran) Esteghlal F.C.
9	FW	Ali Samereh	23 November 1977 (aged 25)		(Iran) Esteghlal F.C.
10	FW	Mohsen Bayatinia	9 April 1980 (aged 22)		(Iran) Pas Tehran F.C.
11	FW	Khodadad Azizi	22 June 1971 (aged 31)		(Iran) PAS Tehran F.C.
13	DF	Hossein Kaebi	23 September 1985 (aged 17)		(Iran) Foolad F.C.
14	MF	Moharram Navidkia	1 November 1982 (aged 20)		(Iran) Sepahan
15	MF	Yadollah Akbari	1 July 1974 (aged 28)		(Iran) Esteghlal F.C.
16	DF	Mehrdad Minavand	30 November 1975 (aged 27)		(United Arab Emirates) Al-Shabab
17	MF	Iman Mobali	3 November 1982 (aged 20)		(Iran) Foolad F.C.
19	DF	Jalal Kameli Mofrad	15 May 1981 (aged 21)		(Iran) Foolad F.C.
20	DF	Mohammad Nosrati	11 January 1982 (aged 21)		(Iran) Pas Tehran F.C.
	FW	Amin Mohtashami	28 August 1977 (aged 25)		(Iran) Paykan F.C.

=== Denmark League XI ===
Coach: Morten Olsen

No.	Pos.	Player	Date of birth (age)	Caps	Club
1	GK	Peter Skov-Jensen	9 June 1971 (aged 31)		(Denmark) FC Midtjylland
2	DF	Martin Albrechtsen	31 March 1980 (aged 22)		(Denmark) F.C. Copenhagen
3	FW	Kaspar Dalgas	11 May 1976 (aged 26)		(Denmark) Brøndby IF
4	DF	Rasmus Daugaard	15 September 1976 (aged 26)		(Denmark) AB
5	MF	Michael Hansen	22 September 1971 (aged 31)		(Denmark) Esbjerg fB
6	MF	Nichlas Hindsberg	7 May 1975 (aged 27)		(Denmark) FC Nordsjælland
7	DF	Allan Jepsen	4 July 1977 (aged 25)		(Denmark) AaB
9	MF	Mads Jørgensen	10 February 1979 (aged 23)		(Denmark) Brøndby IF
10	FW	Søren Berg	15 May 1976 (aged 26)		(Denmark) Odense Boldklub
13	DF	Brian Priske	14 May 1977 (aged 25)		(Denmark) AaB
14	MF	David Rasmussen	1 December 1976 (aged 26)		(Denmark) FC Nordsjælland
15	MF	Thomas Røll	12 March 1977 (aged 25)		(Denmark) F.C. Copenhagen
16	GK	Jimmy Nielsen	6 August 1977 (aged 25)		(Denmark) AaB
17	DF	Thomas Schultz	16 April 1977 (aged 25)		(Denmark) FC Nordsjælland
18	DF	Asbjørn Sennels	17 January 1979 (aged 24)		(Denmark) Brøndby IF
20	MF	Morten Wieghorst (captain)	25 February 1971 (aged 31)		(Denmark) Brøndby IF

=== Uruguay ===
- Coach: Gustavo Ferrín

No.	Pos.	Player	Date of birth (age)	Caps	Club
1	GK	Mauricio Nanni	12 July 1979 (aged 23)		(Uruguay) Montevideo Wanderers F.C.
2	DF	Diego Lugano	2 November 1980 (aged 22)		(Brazil) São Paulo
4	DF	Williams Martinez	18 December 1982 (aged 20)		(Uruguay) Defensor Sporting
5	MF	Marcelo Sosa	6 February 1978 (aged 24)		(Uruguay) Danubio F.C.
6	DF	Pablo Lima	26 April 1981 (aged 21)		(Uruguay) Danubio F.C.
8	DF	Bruno Silva	29 March 1980 (aged 22)		(Uruguay) Danubio F.C.
9		Germán Hornos	21 August 1982 (aged 20)		(Uruguay) Fénix
10	MF	Martín Ligüera (captain)	9 November 1980 (aged 22)		(Uruguay) Fénix
11	MF	Fabián Estoyanoff	27 September 1982 (aged 20)		(Uruguay) Peñarol
13		Claudio Dadómo	10 February 1982 (aged 20)		(Uruguay) Nacional
14		Julio Rodríguez	9 August 1977 (aged 25)		(Uruguay) Nacional
15	FW	Sergio Blanco	25 November 1981 (aged 21)		(Mexico) Club América
17		Julio Mozzo	20 April 1981 (aged 21)		(Uruguay) Central Español
19	FW	Sebastián Taborda	22 May 1981 (aged 21)		(Mexico) UNAM Pumas
20	FW	Mario Leguizamón	7 July 1982 (aged 20)		(Uruguay) Peñarol
21	FW	Horacio Peralta	3 June 1982 (aged 20)		(Uruguay) Nacional
	MF	Pablo Munhoz	31 August 1982 (aged 20)		(Uruguay) Defensor Sporting
	FW	Gonzalo Vargas	22 September 1981 (aged 21)		(Uruguay) Defensor Sporting

== Results ==
=== Semifinals ===
17 February 2003

Iran	1–0	Denmark League XI
Nekounam 48' (pen.)

Hong Kong Stadium, Hong Kong
Attendance: 15,100
Referee: Chiu Sin Chuen (Hong Kong)

17 February 2003

Hong Kong XI	0–3	Uruguay
		Rodríguez 84'; Peralta 86'; Munhoz 89'

Hong Kong Stadium, Hong Kong
Attendance: 15,100
Referee: Shamsul Maidin (Singapore)

=== Third place match ===
20 February 2003

Denmark League XI	2–1	Hong Kong XI
Schultz 14'; Hansen 88' (pen.)		Antonić 90' (pen.)

Hong Kong Stadium, Hong Kong
Attendance: 17,877
Referee: Sun Baojie (China)

=== Final ===
20 February 2003

Uruguay	1–1 (a.e.t.)	Iran
Golmohammadi 83' (o.g.)		Samereh 28'
Penalties
Rodriguez (penalty scored); Estoyanoff (penalty scored); Lima (penalty scored); Silva (penalty scored)	4–2	(penalty missed) Nekounam; (penalty scored) Akbari; (penalty missed) Nosrati; (penalty scored) Mobali

Hong Kong Stadium, Hong Kong
Attendance: 17,877
Referee: Fong Yau Fat (Hong Kong)

== Bracket ==
Semi-finals
17 February 2003 – Hong Kong
Iran	1
Denmark League XI	0
17 February 2003 – Hong Kong
Hong Kong XI	0
Uruguay	3

Final
20 February 2003 – Hong Kong
Iran	1 (2)
Uruguay (pen.)	1 (4)
Third place
20 February 2003 – Hong Kong
Hong Kong XI	1
Denmark League XI	2

2003 Carlsberg Cup champions

Uruguay
First title

== Scorers ==
1 goal

- (Denmark) Thomas Schultz
- (Denmark) Michael Hansen
- (Hong Kong) Dejan Antonić
- (Iran) Javad Nekounam
- (Iran) Ali Samereh
- (Uruguay) Julio Rodríguez
- (Uruguay) Horacio Peralta
- (Uruguay) Pablo Munhoz

own goal

- (Iran) Yahya Golmohammadi

== Individual awards ==
- Best Player: (Iran) Khodadad Azizi
- Best Hong Kong XI Player: Fan Chun Yip
- Best Goalkeeper: (Uruguay) Mauricio Nanni

== See also ==
- Hong Kong Football Association
- Hong Kong First Division League
