= 2017 Chinese FA Women's Cup =

Tournament details
- Country: China
- Dates: 12 June–21 June
- Teams: 16

Final positions
- Champions: Jiangsu Suning
- Runners-up: Changchun Rural Commercial Bank

Tournament statistics
- Matches played: 40
- Goals scored: 145 (3.63 per match)
- Top goal scorer: (Brazil) Rafaelle

The 2017 Chinese FA Women's Cup (Chinese: 2017年中国足球协会杯(女子)) was the 11th edition of the Chinese FA Women's Cup. Jiangsu Suning won their 2nd title after beating Changchun Rural Commercial Bank in the penalty shoot-out.

== Results ==
=== Group stage ===
==== Group A ====
Team	Pld	W	D	L	GF	GA	GD	Pts	Qualification
Jiangsu Suning	3	3	0	0	13	1	+12	9	Qualification to Semi-final
Beijing Enterprise Phoenix	3	0	2	1	5	9	-4	2	Qualification to 5th–8th place Play-offs
Wuhan Jianghan University	3	0	2	1	3	7	-4	2	Qualification to 9th–12th place Play-offs
Guangdong Suoka	3	0	2	1	3	7	-4	2	Qualification to 13th–16th place Play-offs

12 June
Beijing Enterprise Phoenix	2–2	Guangdong Suoka	Weifang Sports Center Stadium, Weifang
Jiangsu Suning	4–0	Wuhan Jianghan University	Weifang Sports Center Stadium, Weifang
14 June
Jiangsu Suning	4–0	Guangdong Suoka	Weifang Sports Center Stadium, Weifang
Wuhan Jianghan University	2–2	Beijing Enterprise Phoenix	Weifang Sports Center Stadium, Weifang
16 June
Guangdong Suoka	1–1	Wuhan Jianghan University	Weifang Sports Center Stadium, Weifang
Jiangsu Suning	5–1	Beijing Enterprise Phoenix	Weifang Sports Center Stadium, Weifang

==== Group B ====
Team	Pld	W	D	L	GF	GA	GD	Pts	Qualification
Henan Huishang	3	3	0	0	10	3	+7	9	Qualification to Semi-final
Hebei China Fortune	3	2	0	1	15	3	+12	6	Qualification to 5th–8th place Play-offs
Sichuan	3	1	0	2	5	9	-4	3	Qualification to 9th–12th place Play-offs
Nei Mongol Hengjun Beilian	3	0	0	3	0	15	-15	0	Qualification to 13th–16th place Play-offs

12 June
Hebei China Fortune	10–0	Nei Mongol Hengjun Beilian	Weifang Sports Center Stadium, Weifang
Sichuan	2–5	Henan Huishang	Weifang Sports Center Stadium, Weifang
14 June
Nei Mongol Hengjun Beilian	0–3	Sichuan	Weifang Sports Center Stadium, Weifang
Hebei China Fortune	1–3	Henan Huishang	Weifang Sports Center Stadium, Weifang
16 June
Henan Huishang	2–0	Nei Mongol Hengjun Beilian	Weifang Sports Center Stadium, Weifang
Hebei China Fortune	4–0	Sichuan	Weifang Sports Center Stadium, Weifang

==== Group C ====
Team	Pld	W	D	L	GF	GA	GD	Pts	Qualification
Changchun Rural Commercial Bank	3	2	1	0	10	1	+9	7	Qualification to Semi-final
Shandong Sports Lottery	3	2	1	0	6	1	+5	7	Qualification to 5th–8th place Play-offs
Zhejiang Lander	3	1	0	2	5	5	0	3	Qualification to 9th–12th place Play-offs
Tianjin Huisen	3	0	0	3	0	14	-14	0	Qualification to 13th–16th place Play-offs

12 June
Tianjin Huisen	0–3	Shandong Sports Lottery	Weifang Sports Center Stadium, Weifang
Changchun Rural Commercial Bank	2–1	Zhejiang Lander	Weifang Sports Center Stadium, Weifang
14 June
Changchun Rural Commercial Bank	0–0	Shandong Sports Lottery	Weifang Sports Center Stadium, Weifang
Zhejiang Lander	3–0	Tianjin Huisen	Weifang Sports Center Stadium, Weifang
16 June
Shandong Sports Lottery	3–1	Zhejiang Lander	Weifang Sports Center Stadium, Weifang
Changchun Rural Commercial Bank	8–0	Tianjin Huisen	Weifang Sports Center Stadium, Weifang

==== Group D ====
Team	Pld	W	D	L	GF	GA	GD	Pts	Qualification
Dalian Quanjian	3	3	0	0	8	0	+8	9	Qualification to Semi-final
Shanghai	3	1	1	1	3	4	-1	4	Qualification to 5th–8th place Play-offs
PLA	3	1	1	1	3	4	-1	4	Qualification to 9th–12th place Play-offs
Shaanxi	3	0	0	3	0	6	-6	0	Qualification to 13th–16th place Play-offs

12 June
Shanghai	2–0	Shaanxi	Weifang Sports Center Stadium, Weifang
Dalian Quanjian	3–0	PLA	Weifang Sports Center Stadium, Weifang
14 June
Shaanxi	0–2	Dalian Quanjian	Weifang Sports Center Stadium, Weifang
Shanghai	1–1	PLA	Weifang Sports Center Stadium, Weifang
16 June
Shanghai	0–3	Dalian Quanjian	Weifang Sports Center Stadium, Weifang
PLA	2–0	Shaanxi	Weifang Sports Center Stadium, Weifang

=== Play-offs ===
==== First round ====
Semi-final

19 June

Jiangsu Suning	2–1	Dalian Quanjian

Weifang Sports Center Stadium, Weifang
19 June

Henan Huishang	1–3	Changchun Rural Commercial Bank

Weifang Sports Center Stadium, Weifang

5th–8th place Play-offs

19 June

Beijing Enterprise Phoenix	0–1	Shanghai

Weifang Sports Center Stadium, Weifang
19 June

Hebei China Fortune	2–4	Shandong Sports Lottery

Weifang Sports Center Stadium, Weifang

9th–12th place Play-offs

19 June

Wuhan Jianghan University	2–2	PLA
Penalties
	5–4

Weifang Sports Center Stadium, Weifang
19 June

Sichuan	1–4	Zhejiang Lander

Weifang Sports Center Stadium, Weifang

13th–16th place Play-offs

19 June

Guangdong Suoka	1–1	Shaanxi
Penalties
	3–4

Weifang Sports Center Stadium, Weifang
19 June

Nei Mongol Hengjun Beilian	0–6	Tianjin Huisen

Weifang Sports Center Stadium, Weifang

==== Second round ====
15th place Play-offs

21 June

Guangdong Suoka	5–0	Nei Mongol Hengjun Beilian

Weifang Sports Center Stadium, Weifang

13th place Play-offs

21 June

Shaanxi	2–0	Tianjin Huisen

Weifang Sports Center Stadium, Weifang

11th place Play-offs

21 June

PLA	3–1	Sichuan

Weifang Sports Center Stadium, Weifang

9th place Play-offs

21 June

Wuhan Jianghan University	1–0	Zhejiang Lander

Weifang Sports Center Stadium, Weifang

7th place Play-offs

21 June

Beijing Enterprise Phoenix	0–2	Hebei China Fortune

Weifang Sports Center Stadium, Weifang

5th place Play-offs

21 June

Shanghai	2–2	Shandong Sports Lottery
Penalties
	2–4

Weifang Sports Center Stadium, Weifang

3rd place Play-offs

21 June

Dalian Quanjian	6–1	Henan Huishang

Weifang Sports Center Stadium, Weifang

==== Final ====
21 June
17:00

Jiangsu Suning	0–0 (a.e.t.)	Changchun Rural Commercial Bank
Penalties
Ni Mengjie (penalty scored); Wu Min (penalty missed); Wang Lisi (penalty scored); Herlovsen (penalty scored)	3–1	(penalty scored) Zhang Rui; (penalty missed) Ren Guixin; (penalty missed) Rafaelle; (penalty missed) Mei Xue

Weifang Sports Center Stadium, Weifang

== Final standings ==
R	Team	G	P	W	D	L	GF	GA	GD	Pts.
1	Jiangsu Suning	A	5	4	1	0	15	2	+13	13
2	Changchun Rural Commercial Bank	C	5	3	2	0	13	2	+11	11
3	Dalian Quanjian	D	5	4	0	1	15	3	+12	12
4	Henan Huishang	B	5	3	0	2	12	12	0	9
5	Shandong Sports Lottery	C	5	3	2	0	12	5	+7	11
6	Shanghai	D	5	2	2	1	6	6	0	8
7	Hebei China Fortune	B	5	3	0	2	19	7	+12	9
8	Beijing Enterprise Phoenix	A	5	0	2	3	5	12	-7	2
9	Wuhan Jianghan University	A	5	1	3	1	6	9	-3	6
10	Zhejiang Lander	C	5	2	0	3	9	7	+2	6
11	PLA	D	5	2	2	1	8	7	+1	8
12	Sichuan	B	5	1	0	4	7	16	-9	3
13	Shaanxi	D	5	1	1	3	3	7	-4	4
14	Tianjin Huisen	C	5	1	0	4	6	16	-10	3
15	Guangdong Suoka	A	5	1	3	1	9	8	+1	6
16	Nei Mongol Hengjun Beilian	B	5	0	0	5	0	26	-26	0
