= 2025 Lunar New Year Cup =

Chinese New Year Cup 2025
FWD富衛保險賀歲盃2025
World Legends	Hong Kong Legends
3	3
- World Legends won 6–5 on penalties
- Date: 1 February 2025
- Venue: Hong Kong Stadium, Hong Kong
- Referee: Tam Ping Wun
- Attendance: 20,013

The FWD Insurance Chinese New Year Cup 2025 (Chinese: FWD富衛保險賀歲盃2025) was the annual edition of the Lunar New Year Cup, held in Hong Kong to celebrate the Lunar New Year in February 2025. The event was sponsored by FWD Insurance, organised by ProEvents, and co-organised by The Football Association of Hong Kong, China.

== Teams ==
- World Legends
- Hong Kong Legends

== Squads ==
=== World Legends ===
No.	Pos.	Player	Date of birth (age)	Club
1	GK	(Czech Republic) Petr Čech	20 May 1982 (aged 42)	
28	GK	(England) David James	1 August 1970 (aged 54)	
2	DF	(Brazil) Cafu	7 June 1970 (aged 54)	
3	DF	(Brazil) Lúcio	8 May 1978 (aged 46)	
15	DF	(Serbia) Nemanja Vidić	21 October 1981 (aged 43)	
19	DF	(France) Bacary Sagna	14 February 1983 (aged 41)	
24	DF	(England) Gary Cahill	19 December 1985 (aged 39)	
33	DF	(England) Ashley Cole	20 December 1980 (aged 44)	
4	MF	(Japan) Keisuke Honda	13 June 1986 (aged 38)	
10	MF	(Brazil) Rivaldo	19 April 1972 (aged 52)	
11	MF	(Wales) Ryan Giggs	29 November 1973 (aged 51)	
18	MF	(England) Paul Scholes	16 November 1974 (aged 50)	
21	MF	(Spain) David Silva	8 January 1986 (aged 39)	
22	MF	(Brazil) Kaká	22 April 1982 (aged 42)	
7	FW	(Uruguay) Diego Forlán	19 May 1979 (aged 45)	
9	FW	(France) Djibril Cissé	12 August 1981 (aged 43)	
17	FW	(Belgium) Eden Hazard	7 January 1991 (aged 34)	
20	FW	(Spain) Luis García	24 June 1978 (aged 46)	

=== Hong Kong Legends ===
No.	Pos.	Player	Date of birth (age)	Club
1	GK	(Hong Kong) Cheung Po Chun	11 May 1971 (aged 53)	
88	GK	(Hong Kong) Fan Chun Yip	1 May 1976 (aged 48)	
3	DF	(Hong Kong) Cristiano Cordeiro	14 August 1973 (aged 51)	
12	DF	(Hong Kong) Lo Kwan Yee	9 October 1984 (aged 40)	(Football Association of Hong Kong, China) Citizen
15	DF	(Hong Kong) Chan Wai Ho	24 April 1982 (aged 42)	
21	DF	(Hong Kong) Tong Kin Man	10 January 1985 (aged 40)	
33	DF	(Hong Kong) So Wai Chuen	26 March 1988 (aged 36)	
5	MF	(Hong Kong) Lam Ka Wai	5 June 1985 (aged 39)	(Football Association of Hong Kong, China) Sun Source
10	MF	(Hong Kong) Leslie Santos	20 July 1967 (aged 57)	
11	MF	(Hong Kong) Lee Kin Wo	20 October 1967 (aged 57)	
13	MF	(Hong Kong) Chan Chi Hong	20 October 1976 (aged 48)	
16	MF	(Hong Kong) Shum Kwok Pui	11 August 1970 (aged 54)	
17	MF	(Hong Kong) Lee Hong Lim	29 September 1983 (aged 41)	(Football Association of Hong Kong, China) Central & Western District
19	MF	(Hong Kong) Huang Yang	30 October 1983 (aged 41)	
20	MF	(Hong Kong) Li Chun Yip	18 September 1981 (aged 43)	
24	MF	(Hong Kong) Ju Yingzhi	24 July 1987 (aged 37)	(Football Association of Hong Kong, China) Southern District
7	FW	(Hong Kong) Chan Siu Ki	14 July 1985 (aged 39)	(Football Association of Hong Kong, China) Kui Tan
8	FW	(Hong Kong) Christian Annan	3 May 1978 (aged 46)	(Football Association of Hong Kong, China) Central & Western District
18	FW	(Hong Kong) Jordi Tarrés	16 March 1981 (aged 43)	

== Results ==
1 February 2025
20:00 UTC+8

World Legends	3–3	Hong Kong Legends
Giggs 38'; Luis García 75', 88'	Report	Lee Hong Lim 31', 45+1'; Ju Yingzhi 50'
Penalties
Giggs (penalty scored); Cissé (penalty scored); Luis García (penalty scored); Forlán (penalty scored); Kaká (penalty scored); Honda (penalty scored)	6–5	Santos (penalty scored); Annan (penalty scored); Ju Yingzhi (penalty scored); Lee Hong Lim (penalty scored); Lam Ka Wai (penalty scored); Lo Kwan Yee (penalty missed)

Hong Kong Stadium, Hong Kong
Attendance: 20,013
Referee: Tam Ping Wun
