= 2018 Chinese Women's Football Championship =

Tournament details
- Country: China
- Dates: 3–14 July 2018
- Teams: 16

Final positions
- Champions: Jiangsu Suning
- Runners-up: Dalian Quanjian

The 2018 Chinese Women's Football Championship (Chinese: 2018年中国女子足球锦标赛) was the 28th edition of the Chinese Women's Football Championship. Shanghai are the defending champions. It was held between 3 July to 14 July 2018.

== Group stage ==
=== Group A ===
Team	Pld	W	D	L	GF	GA	GD	Pts	Qualification
Shandong Sports Lottery	3	2	1	0	10	2	+8	7	Quarter-Finals
Beijing BG Phoenix	3	1	2	0	5	1	+4	5	Quarter-Finals
Guangdong Meizhou Huijun	3	1	1	1	1	1	0	4	Qualification to 9th–16th-place play-offs
Sichuan	3	0	0	3	1	13	-12	0	Qualification to 9th–16th-place play-offs

3 July 2018	Beijing BG Phoenix	0–0	Guangdong Meizhou Huijun	Weifang Sports Center Stadium Outer Field 1, Weifang
9:00

3 July 2018	Shandong Sports Lottery	8–1	Sichuan	Weifang Sports Center Stadium, Weifang
9:00

5 July 2018	Beijing BG Phoenix	4–0	Sichuan	Weifang Sports Center Stadium, Weifang
16:00

5 July 2018	Guangdong Meizhou Huijun	0–1	Shandong Sports Lottery	Weifang Sports Center Stadium Outer Field 1, Weifang
16:00

7 July 2018	Beijing BG Phoenix	1–1	Shandong Sports Lottery	Weifang Sports Center Stadium, Weifang
14:00

7 July 2018	Sichuan	0–1	Guangdong Meizhou Huijun	Weifang Sports Center Stadium Outer Field 1, Weifang
14:00

=== Group B ===
Team	Pld	W	D	L	GF	GA	GD	Pts	Qualification
Jiangsu Suning	3	3	0	0	17	0	+17	9	Quarter-Finals
Henan Huishang	3	1	1	1	10	6	+4	4	Quarter-Finals
Hebei China Fortune	3	1	1	1	7	8	-1	4	Qualification to 9th–16th-place play-offs
Nei Mongol Hengjun Beilian	3	0	0	3	0	20	-20	0	Qualification to 9th–16th-place play-offs

3 July 2018	Hebei China Fortune	5–0	Nei Mongol Hengjun Beilian	Weifang Sports Center Stadium Outer Field 2, Weifang
9:00

3 July 2018	Jiangsu Suning	4–0	Henan Huishang	Weifang Sports Center Stadium, Weifang
14:00

5 July 2018	Nei Mongol Hengjun Beilian	0–7	Jiangsu Suning	Weifang Sports Center Stadium Outer Field 1, Weifang
9:00

5 July 2018	Hebei China Fortune	2–2	Henan Huishang	Weifang Sports Center Stadium Outer Field 2, Weifang
16:00

7 July 2018	Hebei China Fortune	0–6	Jiangsu Suning	Weifang Sports Center Stadium, Weifang
16:00

7 July 2018	Henan Huishang	8–0	Nei Mongol Hengjun Beilian	Weifang Sports Center Stadium Outer Field 2, Weifang
16:00

=== Group C ===
Team	Pld	W	D	L	GF	GA	GD	Pts	Qualification
Zhejiang	3	1	2	0	10	3	+7	5	Quarter-Finals
Wuhan Jianghan University	3	1	2	0	6	5	+1	5	Quarter-Finals
Shanghai	3	1	2	0	9	2	+7	5	Qualification to 9th–16th-place play-offs
Hebei Elite	3	0	0	3	2	17	-15	0	Qualification to 9th–16th-place play-offs

3 July 2018	Shanghai	7–0	Hebei Elite	Weifang Sports Center Stadium Outer Field 1, Weifang
14:00

3 July 2018	Wuhan Jianghan University	2–2	Zhejiang	Weifang Sports Center Stadium, Weifang
16:00

5 July 2018	Shanghai	1–1	Zhejiang	Weifang Sports Center Stadium, Weifang
9:00

5 July 2018	Hebei Elite	2–3	Wuhan Jianghan University	Weifang Sports Center Stadium Outer Field 2, Weifang
9:00

7 July 2018	Shanghai	1–1	Wuhan Jianghan University	Weifang Sports Center Stadium, Weifang
8:30

7 July 2018	Zhejiang	7–0	Hebei Elite	Weifang Sports Center Stadium Outer Field 1, Weifang
8:30

=== Group D ===
Team	Pld	W	D	L	GF	GA	GD	Pts	Qualification
Dalian Quanjian	3	3	0	0	13	1	+12	9	Quarter-Finals
Changchun Rural Commercial Bank	3	2	0	1	15	3	+12	6	Quarter-Finals
Shaanxi	3	1	0	2	4	7	-3	3	Qualification to 9th–16th-place play-offs
PLA	3	0	0	3	0	21	-21	0	Qualification to 9th–16th-place play-offs

3 July 2018	Changchun Rural Commercial Bank	4–0	Shaanxi	Weifang Sports Center Stadium Outer Field 2, Weifang
16:00

3 July 2018	PLA	0–7	Dalian Quanjian	Weifang Sports Center Stadium Outer Field 1, Weifang
16:00

5 July 2018	Changchun Rural Commercial Bank	1–3	Dalian Quanjian	Weifang Sports Center Stadium, Weifang
14:00

5 July 2018	Shaanxi	4–0	PLA	Weifang Sports Center Stadium Outer Field 1, Weifang
14:00

7 July 2018	Changchun Rural Commercial Bank	10–0	PLA	Weifang Sports Center Stadium, Weifang
10:30

7 July 2018	Dalian Quanjian	3–0	Shaanxi	Weifang Sports Center Stadium Outer Field 2, Weifang
10:30

== Play-offs ==
=== 9th–16th-place play-offs ===
10 July 2018	Guangdong Meizhou Huijun	2–0	PLA	Weifang Sports Center Stadium, Weifang
9:00

10 July 2018	Hebei China Fortune	5–0	Hebei Elite	Weifang Sports Center Stadium Outer Field 1, Weifang
9:00

10 July 2018	Shanghai	9–0	Nei Mongol Hengjun Beilian	Weifang Sports Center Stadium Outer Field 2, Weifang
9:00

10 July 2018	Shaanxi	1–0	Sichuan	Weifang Sports Center Stadium Outer Field 1, Weifang
14:00

=== 13th–16th-place play-offs ===
12 July 2018	PLA	2–4	Hebei Elite	Weifang Sports Center Stadium Outer Field 2, Weifang
9:00

12 July 2018	Nei Mongol Hengjun Beilian	0–1	Sichuan	Weifang Sports Center Stadium Outer Field 1, Weifang
9:00

=== 9th–12th-place play-offs ===
12 July 2018	Guangdong Meizhou Huijun	4–0	Hebei China Fortune	Weifang Sports Center Stadium, Weifang
9:00

12 July 2018	Shanghai	4–1	Shaanxi	Weifang Sports Center Stadium Outer Field 2, Weifang
14:00

=== 15th–16th-place play-off ===
14 July 2018	PLA	1–2	Nei Mongol Hengjun Beilian	Weifang Sports Center Stadium Outer Field 2, Weifang
9:00

=== 13th–14th-place play-off ===
14 July 2018	Hebei Elite	2–3	Sichuan	Weifang Sports Center Stadium Outer Field 1, Weifang
9:00

=== 11th–12th-place play-off ===
14 July 2018	Hebei China Fortune	1–1 (4–5 p)	Shaanxi	Weifang Sports Center Stadium, Weifang
9:00

=== 9th–10th-place play-off ===
14 July 2018	Guangdong Meizhou Huijun	1–2	Shanghai	Weifang Sports Center Stadium Outer Field 2, Weifang
14:00

== Quarter-finals ==
10 July 2018	Shandong Sports Lottery	0–0 (4–5 p)	Changchun Rural Commercial Bank	Weifang Sports Center Stadium, Weifang
14:00

10 July 2018	Jiangsu Suning	4–2	Wuhan Jianghan University	Weifang Sports Center Stadium, Weifang
16:00

10 July 2018	Zhejiang	1–0	Henan Huishang	Weifang Sports Center Stadium Outer Field 1, Weifang
16:00

10 July 2018	Dalian Quanjian	3–0	Beijing BG Phoenix	Weifang Sports Center Stadium Outer Field 2, Weifang
16:00

== 5th–8th-place play-offs ==
12 July 2018	Shandong Sports Lottery	5–1	Wuhan Jianghan University	Weifang Sports Center Stadium, Weifang
14:00

12 July 2018	Henan Huishang	4–5	Beijing BG Phoenix	Weifang Sports Center Stadium Outer Field 2, Weifang
16:00

== Semi-finals ==
12 July 2018	Zhejiang	0–3	Dalian Quanjian	Weifang Sports Center Stadium, Weifang
16:00

12 July 2018	Changchun Rural Commercial Bank	2–3	Jiangsu Suning	Weifang Sports Center Stadium Outer Field 1, Weifang
16:00

== 7th–8th-place play-off ==
14 July 2018	Wuhan Jianghan University	2–1	Henan Huishang	Weifang Sports Center Stadium Outer Field 1, Weifang
14:00

== 5th–6th-place play-off ==
14 July 2018	Shandong Sports Lottery	1–2	Beijing BG Phoenix	Weifang Sports Center Stadium Outer Field 2, Weifang
16:00

== 3rd–4th-place play-off ==
14 July 2018	Zhejiang	2–0	Changchun Rural Commercial Bank	Weifang Sports Center Stadium Outer Field 1, Weifang
16:00

== Final ==
14 July 2018	Dalian Quanjian	0–3	Jiangsu Suning	Weifang Sports Center Stadium, Weifang
16:00
