= Dhurakij Pundit University =

Private university in Bangkok, Thailand

Coordinates: 13.8711°N 100.5500°E

Dhurakij Pundit University (DPU)
- Type: Private
- Established: 1986 1990-2019
- President: Darika Lathapipat
- Location: Lak Si, Bangkok, Thailand
- Colours: Purple, light blue
- Website: www.dpu.ac.th

Dhurakij Pundit University (Thai: มหาวิทยาลัยธุรกิจบัณฑิตย์; RTGS: maha witthayalai thurakit bandit, pronounced [mā.hǎː.wít.tʰā.jāː.lāj tʰú.rá.kìt bān.dìt]; thurakit translates to "business", pundit to "scholar") is a university in Bangkok, Thailand. Founded as Dhurakij Pundit College in 1968, and upgraded to university status in 1984, it is one of the larger Thai private universities. Undergraduate and graduate degree programs are offered through the university's nine faculties, the graduate school, and the international college.

== International affiliations and partnerships ==
DPU has affiliations with universities in Australia, the United States, the People's Republic of China, Japan, Canada, France and Sweden. INO is responsible for setting up international exchange programs for both the staff and students.
