= Mauricio Nanni =

Uruguayan footballer (1979–2026)

Personal information
- Full name: Mauricio Daniel Nanni Lima
- Date of birth: 12 July 1979
- Place of birth: Montevideo, Uruguay
- Date of death: 9 March 2026 (aged 46)
- Height: 1.78 m (5 ft 10 in)
- Position: Goalkeeper

Senior career*
| Years | Team | Apps | (Gls) |
| 1998–2005 | Montevideo Wanderers | 131 | (0) |
| 2004–2005 | → Racing de Santander (loan) | 0 | (0) |
| 2006 | Racing de Ferrol | 4 | (0) |
| 2006 | Marathón | | |
| 2007 | Defensor Sporting | 3 | (0) |
| 2007 | Aucas | | |
| 2008 | Bella Vista | 14 | (0) |
| 2008–2010 | Niki Volos | 4 | (0) |
| 2010–2011 | Montevideo Wanderers | 26 | (0) |
| 2011 | C.A.I. | | |
| 2012 | Cerrito | 15 | (0) |
| 2012–2013 | Bella Vista | 9 | (0) |
| 2013–2015 | Villa Española | 26 | (0) |

International career
| 1999 | Uruguay U20 | | |
| 2003 | Uruguay | 2 | (0) |
- * Club domestic league appearances and goals

Mauricio Daniel Nanni Lima (12 July 1979 – 9 March 2026) was a Uruguayan footballer who played as a goalkeeper.

== International career ==
Nanni played for the Uruguay under-20 national team at the 1999 FIFA World Youth Championship as a backup to Fabián Carini.

He made his debut for the senior side at the 2003 Lunar New Year Cup.

== Death ==
Nanni died on 9 March 2026, at the age of 46.
