= Lunar New Year Cup =

- Organiser(s): HKFA
- Founded: 1908; 118 years ago
- Region: Hong Kong
- Teams: 2
- Current champions: Hong Kong League XI
- Most championships: Hong Kong League XI (8 titles)
- 2026 Lunar New Year Cup

The Lunar New Year Cup, previously known as the Carlsberg Challenge or the Carlsberg Cup, is an annual invitational football tournament organised in Hong Kong by the Hong Kong Football Association (HKFA) since 1908. It is usually held on the first and the fourth day of the Lunar New Year as a part of the new year celebrations. The tournament was called the Carlsberg Cup from 1986 to 1989 and from 1993 to 2006 as Carlsberg was the major sponsor of the event.

Since the 2007 edition of the event, the competition has officially been known as the "Lunar New Year Cup" by the Hong Kong Football Association. This is because Carlsberg is now no longer the major sponsor but a mere co-sponsor. During 2011 and 2012, the name of the event was changed to "Asian Challenge Cup".

== History ==
Initially, a touring team (usually European) visited Hong Kong playing exhibition matches vs local combined. In the period before and around the Second World War, the Lunar New Year Cup was competed for by teams from Hong Kong and mainland China. Since 1950, HKFA has invited at least one overseas team to enter the competition. Before 1982, there were three exhibition matches in the tournament. The first two were usually played by the Hong Kong national football team, Hong Kong player team and Hong Kong League XI while the Chinese XI played the last match.

In 1983, there was a main sponsorship for the competition for the first time and the number of invited teams was increased to three. From 1993 onwards, national teams rather than club teams were invited to participate in the competition. Many of the matches in that period were recognised as "full internationals" by FIFA.

== Competition name and sponsorship ==
| Year | Name | Sponsor |
|---|---|---|
| 1983 | Coupe du Solvil et Titus | (Hong Kong) Solvil et Titus |
| 1984 | Adidas Gold Cup | (Germany) Adidas |
| 1986–89 | Carlsberg Cup | (Denmark) Carlsberg |
| 1990–92 | Marlboro Cup | (United States) Marlboro |
| 1993–2006 | Carlsberg Cup | (Denmark) Carlsberg |
| 2008 | Wing Lung Bank Cup | (Hong Kong) Wing Lung Bank |
| 2010 | Fortis Insurance Company Tiger Lunar New Year Cup | (Hong Kong) Fortis Insurance Company |
| 2011 | RedMR Asian Challenge Cup | (Hong Kong) RedMR |
| 2012 | Nikon Asian Challenge Cup | (Japan) Nikon |
| 2013 | China Mobile Satellite Communications Cup | (Hong Kong) China Mobile Satellite Communications |
| 2014 | AET Cup | (Hong Kong) AET |
| 2017 | Nike Lunar New Year Cup | (United States) Nike |
| 2019 | Tonghai Financial Chinese New Year Cup | China Tonghai Financial |
| 2024–26 | FWD Insurance Chinese New Year Cup | (Hong Kong) FWD Group |

== Results ==
Lunar New Year Cup – year by year
| Year | Final | | | Third place match | | |
| Year | Winner | Score | Runner-up | Third place | Score | Fourth place |
|---|---|---|---|---|---|---|
| 1908–73 (Note: Exhibition matches.) | (Interport and exhibition matches) | | | | | |
| 1974 | Hong Kong | — (Note: Three-team round-robin tournament) | (Brazil) CA Juventus | (Portugal) Sporting CP | — | |
| 1975 | (Argentina) Independiente | — | Hong Kong | Hong Kong League XI | — | |
| 1976 | (Switzerland) Grasshopper | — | Hong Kong League XI | Hong Kong | — | |
| 1977 | (Netherlands) Sparta Rotterdam | — | Hong Kong | Hong Kong League XI | — | |
| 1978 | China | — | (Switzerland) Servette FC | Hong Kong | — | |
| 1979 | (China) Guangdong | — | (Sweden) Östers IF | Hong Kong League XI | — | |
| 1980 | (Socialist Federal Republic of Yugoslavia) Red Star Belgrade | — | Hong Kong League XI | Hong Kong | — | |
| 1981 | (Socialist Federal Republic of Yugoslavia) Dinamo Zagreb | — | Hong Kong League XI | Hong Kong | — | |
| 1982 | FK Austria Wien | 1–0 | (South Korea) Hallelujah FC | (Hong Kong) Seiko SA | 1–1 (5–3 p) | Hong Kong League XI |
| 1983 | Hong Kong League XI | 2–0 | (South Korea) Hallelujah FC | (Denmark) AGF | 3–1 | (China) Beijing Selection |
| 1984 | (Socialist Federal Republic of Yugoslavia) FK Partizan | 1–0 | Hong Kong League XI | (South Korea) Daewoo Royals | 2–1 | (Denmark) Lyngby Boldklub |
| 1985 | Hong Kong League British XI | 1–0 | Hong Kong League XI | (China) Guangzhou | n/a | (China) Shanghai |
| 1986 | Paraguay | — | South Korea | Hong Kong League XI | — | |
| 1987 | (Denmark) Brøndby IF | 2–0 | Hong Kong | (China) Beijing | 1–0 | (China) Shanghai |
| 1988 | Hong Kong League XI | 0–0 (5–3 p) | (Denmark) AGF | (South Korea) Lucky-Goldstar FC | 3–0 | (China) Dalian Shide |
| 1989 | (Sweden) Malmö FF | — (Note: Four-team round-robin tournament) | China | Hong Kong | — | (Denmark) Odense BK |
| 1990 | (Czechoslovakia) Sparta Prague | 2–0 | China | (Soviet Union) Spartak Moscow | 4–1 | Hong Kong League XI |
| 1991 | Hong Kong League XI | 3–1 | (England) Aston Villa | (Soviet Union) FC Dynamo Moscow | 2–0 | Thailand |
| 1992 | Hong Kong League XI | 2–2 (3–2 p) | (Socialist Federal Republic of Yugoslavia) FK Partizan | (Romania) Steaua București | 2–0 | (Switzerland) BSC Young Boys Bern |
| 1993 | Switzerland | 3–2 | Hong Kong League XI | Denmark U-21 | 2–1 | Japan |
| 1994 | Denmark | 2–0 | Hong Kong League XI | Romania League XI | 2–1 | United States |
| 1995 | (Federal Republic of Yugoslavia) FR Yugoslavia | 1–0 | South Korea | Colombia | 3–1 | Hong Kong League XI |
| 1996 | Sweden | 1–1 (5–4 p) | Japan | Poland | 1–0 | Hong Kong League XI |
| 1997 | Russia | 2–1 | Switzerland | (Federal Republic of Yugoslavia) FR Yugoslavia | 3–1 | Hong Kong League XI |
| 1998 | Nigeria | 2–0 | Hong Kong League XI | Iran | 1–1 (4–2 p) | Chile |
| 1999 | Mexico | 3–0 | Egypt | Bulgaria | 3–0 | Hong Kong League XI |
| 2000 | Czech Republic | 2–1 | Mexico | Japan | 0–0 (6–5 p) | Hong Kong League XI |
| 2001 | Norway | 2–1 | Hong Kong League XI | South Korea | 1–1 (6–5 p) | Paraguay |
| 2002 | Honduras | 1–0 | Hong Kong League XI | Slovenia | 0–0 (4–3 p) | China |
| 2003 | Uruguay | 1–1 (4–2 p) | Iran | Denmark League XI | 2–1 | Hong Kong League XI |
| 2004 | Norway | 3–1 | Honduras | Sweden | 3–0 | Hong Kong League XI |
| 2005 | Brazil | 7–1 | Hong Kong | (2 teams only) | | |
| 2006 | Denmark | 3–1 | South Korea | Croatia | 4–0 | Hong Kong |
| 2007 | Jamaica Olympic Team | 0–0 (5–4 p) | China PR Olympic Team | Australia Olympic Team | 2–2 (5–3 p) | Hong Kong League XI |
| 2008 | Hong Kong League XI | 2–1 | (Croatia) HNK Hajduk Split | (Uruguay) Peñarol | 1–1 (5–4 p) | (South Korea) Ulsan Hyundai |
| 2009 | (Hong Kong) South China & Pegasus United | 2–1 | (Czech Republic) Sparta Prague | (South Korea) Suwon Samsung Bluewings | 0–0 (5–4 p) | Hong Kong League XI |
| 2010 | (South Korea) Pohang Steelers | — | (Hong Kong) Kitchee | (Hong Kong) Pegasus Invitation Team | — | |
| 2011 | (China) Tianjin Teda | 0–0 (5–3 p) | (China) Guangzhou Evergrande | (South Korea) Ulsan Hyundai | 4–2 | (Hong Kong) South China |
| 2012 | (South Korea) Seongnam Ilhwa Chunma | 5–1 | (Japan) Shimizu S-Pulse | (China) Guangzhou R&F | 1–1 (3–1 p) | (Hong Kong) South China |
| 2013 | (South Korea) Busan IPark | 1–0 | (China) Shanghai East Asia | Hong Kong League XI | 1–0 | (Thailand) Muangthong United |
| 2014 | (Hong Kong) (Ecuador) Citizen & Cuenca United | 2–0 | (Portugal) Olhanense | (Russia) Krylia Sovetov | 1–0 | (Japan) FC Tokyo |
| 2015 | (United States) New York Cosmos | 2–2 (4–2 p) | (Hong Kong) South China | (2 teams only) | | |
| 2016 | Hong Kong League XI | 4–0 | Hong Kong | (2 teams only) | | |
| 2017 | (New Zealand) Auckland City | 1–0 | (Hong Kong) Kitchee | (Thailand) Muangthong United | 1–0 | (South Korea) FC Seoul |
| 2018 | Hong Kong League XI | 4–3 | Hong Kong | (2 teams only) | | |
| 2019 | (China) Shandong Luneng | 3–1 | (Japan) Sagan Tosu | Hong Kong League XI | 1–0 | (New Zealand) Auckland City |
| 2020 | Cancelled (Note: The 2020 to 2023 event was cancelled due to the COVID-19 pandemic in Hong Kong.) | | | | | |
| 2021 | Cancelled | | | | | |
| 2022 | Cancelled | | | | | |
| 2023 | Cancelled | | | | | |
| 2024 | World Legends | 7–3 | Hong Kong Legends | (2 teams only) | | |
| 2025 | World Legends | 3–3 (6–5 p) | Hong Kong Legends | (2 teams only) | | |
| 2026 | Hong Kong | 1–1 (5–4 p) | (South Korea) FC Seoul | (2 teams only) | | |
