= Wong Man Ching =

Hongkonger footballer

Personal information
- Position: Forward

International career^{‡}
Years	Team	Apps	(Gls)
2009	Hong Kong	1+	(0+)
- ‡ National team caps and goals as of 8 July 2009.

Wong Man Ching is a Hongkonger former footballer who played as a forward. She has been a member of the Hong Kong women's national team.

== International career ==
Wong Man Ching capped for Hong Kong at senior level during the 2010 AFC Women's Asian Cup qualification.

== See also ==
- List of Hong Kong women's international footballers
