= Huang Yini =

Chinese footballer

Personal information
- Full name: Huang Yini
- Date of birth: 20 January 1993 (age 33)
- Position: Midfielder

Team information
- Current team: Shanghai Shengli
- Number: 8

Senior career*
Years	Team	Apps	(Gls)
2020–	Shanghai Shengli		

International career^{‡}
2009	China U16		(1)
2011	China U19		(0)
2012	China U20	3	(0)
2014–2019	China	11	(1)
Medal record
Women's football
Representing China
Asian Games
Silver medal – second place	2018 Palembang	Team
- * Club domestic league appearances and goals as of 11 October 2020 ‡ National team caps and goals as of 6 March 2019

Huang Yini (simplified Chinese: 黄旖旎; traditional Chinese: 黃旖旎; pinyin: Huáng Yínī; born 20 January 1993) is a Chinese footballer who plays as a midfielder for Chinese Women's Super League club Shanghai Shengli FC. She has been a member of the China women's national team.

== International goals ==
No.	Date	Venue	Opponent	Score	Result	Competition
1.	3 December 2019	Guam Football Association National Training Center, Dededo, Guam	Hong Kong	4–0	6–0	2019 EAFF E-1 Football Championship

== Honours ==
China

- Asian Games silver medalist: 2018
- AFC Women's Asian Cup third place: 2014
