= Man Po Kei =

Hongkonger footballer

Personal information
- Position: Defender

International career^{‡}
Years	Team	Apps	(Gls)
2007–2011	Hong Kong	5+	(0+)
- ‡ National team caps and goals as of 27 March 2011.

Man Po Kei is a Hongkonger footballer who plays as a defender. She has been a member of the Hong Kong women's national team.

== International career ==
Man Po Kei capped for Hong Kong at senior level during three AFC Women's Asian Cup qualifications (2008 and 2010) and the 2012 AFC Women's Olympic Qualifying Tournament.

== See also ==
- List of Hong Kong women's international footballers
