= Wang Yan (footballer) =

Chinese association football player

Personal information
- Full name: Wang Yan
- Date of birth: 22 August 1991 (age 35)
- Height: 1.75 m (5 ft 9 in)
- Position: Midfielder

Senior career*
Years	Team	Apps	(Gls)
-2018	Dalian		
2019–2020	Beijing	6	(1)
2021–2022	Wuhan Jianghan University	20	(0)
2023–2024	Wuhan Sports University		
2025	Beijing Jingtan	1	(0)

International career^{‡}
2018–	China	31	(0)
Medal record
Women's football
Representing China
Asian Games
Silver medal – second place	2018 Palembang	Team
- * Club domestic league appearances and goals as of 25 June 2019 ‡ National team caps and goals as of 25 June 2019

Wang Yan (Chinese: 王焱; born 22 August 1991) is a Chinese association football player who plays as a midfielder.

== Career statistics ==
=== International ===
As of matches played 7 June 2019.

National team	Year	Apps	Goals
China	2018	1	0
China	2019	1	0
Total		2	0

== Honours ==
China

- Asian Games silver medalist: 2018
