= 2026 Lunar New Year Cup =

Chinese New Year Cup 2026
FWD富衛保險賀歲盃2026
Hong Kong	FC Seoul
(Hong Kong)	(South Korea)
1	1
- Hong Kong won 5–4 on penalties
- Date: 21 February 2026
- Venue: Hong Kong Stadium, Hong Kong
- Man of the Match: Pong Cheuk Hei
- Referee: Wong Wai Lun
- Attendance: 14,089

The FWD Insurance Chinese New Year Cup 2026 (Chinese: FWD富衛保險賀歲盃2026) is the annual edition of the Lunar New Year Cup, held in Hong Kong to celebrate the Lunar New Year in February 2026. The event was sponsored by FWD Insurance, organised by The Football Association of Hong Kong, China.

== Teams ==
- Hong Kong
- (South Korea) FC Seoul

== Results ==
19 February 2026
15:00 UTC+8

Hong Kong	1–1	(South Korea) FC Seoul
Juninho 21'	Report	Klimala 57'
Penalties
Udebuluzor (penalty scored); Fernando (penalty scored); Yu Wai Lim (penalty scored); Lau Ka Kiu (penalty scored); J. Lam (penalty scored)	5–4	(penalty scored) Klimala; (penalty scored) Jeong Seung-won; (penalty scored) Babec; (penalty scored) Park Soo-il; (penalty missed) Cho Young-wook

Hong Kong Stadium, Hong Kong
Attendance: 14,089
Referee: Wong Wai Lun
