= 2015 Lunar New Year Cup =

2015 Lunar New Year Cup (Chinese: 羊年賀歲盃; lit. 'Year of the Goat Celebrate New Year Cup'), also known as the Lunar New Year AET Cup 2015 (Chinese: 2015年AET羊年賀歲盃) due to sponsorship reason, is the annual football event held in Hong Kong to celebrate the Chinese New Year. South China of Hong Kong Premier League were authorised by the Hong Kong Football Association to hold the 2015 event; and New York Cosmos of North American Soccer League were invited to participate. It was the first time an American football team had joined this event. The football march between these two teams was played in Hong Kong Stadium on 4 February 2015, the Chinese New Year Day. The Cup was won by New York Cosmos after a penalty shootout.

== Teams ==
There were two teams participated in the 2015 Lunar New Year Cup. Former Real Madrid striker Raul made his debut appearance for New York Cosmos in the match.

| Team | Country | League last season | Pos. |
|---|---|---|---|
| South China | Hong Kong | Hong Kong First Division | 3rd |
| New York Cosmos | United States | NASL | 3rd |

== Squads ==
=== South China ===
| No. | Pos. | Player | Date of birth (age) | Caps | Club |
|---|---|---|---|---|---|
| 2 | DF | (Hong Kong) Jack Sealy | 4 May 1987 (aged 27) | | (Hong Kong) South China |
| 3 | MF | (Hong Kong) Michael Campion | 20 May 1984 (aged 30) | | (Hong Kong) South China |
| 5 | DF | (Hong Kong) Chak Ting Fung | 27 November 1989 (aged 25) | | (Hong Kong) South China |
| 6 | MF | (England) Andy Russell | 21 November 1987 (aged 27) | | (Hong Kong) South China |
| 7 | FW | (Hong Kong) Chan Siu Ki | 14 July 1985 (aged 29) | | (Hong Kong) South China |
| 8 | FW | (Cameroon) Mahama Awal | 10 June 1991 (aged 23) | | (Hong Kong) South China |
| 9 | MF | (Hong Kong) Lee Wai Lim | 5 May 1981 (aged 33) | | (Hong Kong) South China |
| 10 | FW | (Hong Kong) Lam Hok Hei | 18 September 1991 (aged 23) | | (Hong Kong) South China |
| 11 | MF | (Brazil) Itaparica | 8 July 1980 (aged 34) | | (Hong Kong) South China |
| 12 | GK | (Ecuador) Cristian Mora | 26 August 1979 (aged 35) | | (Hong Kong) South China |
| 14 | FW | (Japan) Yuto Nakamura | 23 January 1987 (aged 28) | | (Hong Kong) South China |
| 15 | DF | (Hong Kong) Chan Wai Ho | 24 April 1982 (aged 32) | | (Hong Kong) South China |
| 16 | MF | (Hong Kong) Chan Siu Kwan | 1 August 1992 (aged 22) | | (Hong Kong) South China |
| 17 | MF | (Hong Kong) Leung Chun Pong | 1 October 1986 (aged 28) | | (Hong Kong) South China |
| 19 | MF | (Australia) Evan Kostopoulos | 17 May 1990 (aged 24) | | (Hong Kong) South China |
| 20 | MF | (Hong Kong) Lau Cheuk Hin | 16 April 1992 (aged 22) | | (Hong Kong) South China |
| 21 | MF | (Hong Kong) Law Hiu Chung | 10 June 1995 (aged 19) | | (Hong Kong) South China |
| 22 | DF | (Serbia) Bojan Mališić | 14 January 1985 (aged 30) | | (Hong Kong) South China |
| 23 | DF | (Hong Kong) Che Runqiu | 25 October 1990 (aged 24) | | (Hong Kong) South China |
| 24 | MF | (Hong Kong) Lo Kong Wai | 19 June 1992 (aged 22) | | (Hong Kong) South China |
| 30 | FW | (Hong Kong) Detinho | 11 September 1973 (aged 41) | | (Hong Kong) South China |
| 31 | FW | (Hong Kong) Cheng Lai Hin | 31 March 1986 (aged 28) | | (Hong Kong) South China |
| 33 | DF | (Hong Kong) Law Chun Bong | 25 January 1981 (aged 34) | | (Hong Kong) South China |
| 38 | FW | (Australia) Daniel McBreen | 23 April 1977 (aged 37) | | (Hong Kong) South China |
| 39 | GK | (Hong Kong) Leung Hing Kit | 22 October 1989 (aged 25) | | (Hong Kong) South China |
| 99 | DF | (Hong Kong) Li Ngai Hoi | 15 October 1994 (aged 20) | | (Hong Kong) South China |

=== New York Cosmos ===
| No. | Pos. | Player | Date of birth (age) | Caps | Club |
|---|---|---|---|---|---|
| 1 | GK | (United States) Jimmy Maurer | 14 October 1988 (aged 26) | | (United States) New York Cosmos |
| 2 | DF | (United States) Hunter Freeman | 8 January 1985 (aged 30) | | (United States) New York Cosmos |
| 3 | DF | (United States) Hunter Gorskie | 27 June 1991 (aged 23) | | (United States) New York Cosmos |
| 4 | DF | (United States) Carlos Mendes | 25 December 1980 (aged 34) | | (United States) New York Cosmos |
| 5 | DF | (Paraguay) Samuel Cáceres | 20 February 1989 (aged 25) | | (United States) New York Cosmos |
| 7 | FW | (Spain) Raúl | 27 June 1977 (aged 37) | | (United States) New York Cosmos |
| 11 | MF | (El Salvador) Andrés Flores | 31 August 1990 (aged 24) | | (United States) New York Cosmos |
| 12 | GK | (United States) Kyle Zobeck | 6 February 1990 (aged 25) | | (United States) New York Cosmos |
| 13 | MF | (Uruguay) Sebastián Guenzatti | 8 July 1991 (aged 23) | | (United States) New York Cosmos |
| 14 | MF | (United States) Danny Szetela | 17 June 1987 (aged 27) | | (United States) New York Cosmos |
| 16 | MF | (Scotland) Adam Moffat | 15 May 1986 (aged 28) | | (United States) New York Cosmos |
| 17 | MF | (Spain) Ayoze García | 25 November 1985 (aged 29) | | (United States) New York Cosmos |
| 18 | FW | (Norway) Mads Stokkelien | 15 March 1990 (aged 24) | | (United States) New York Cosmos |
| 19 | MF | (Spain) Marcos Senna | 17 July 1976 (aged 38) | | (United States) New York Cosmos |
| 20 | MF | (United States) Wálter Restrepo | 21 June 1988 (aged 26) | | (United States) New York Cosmos |
| 21 | FW | (Colombia) David Diosa | 4 December 1992 (aged 22) | | (United States) New York Cosmos |
| 22 | MF | (Brazil) Leo Fernandes | 23 December 1991 (aged 23) | | (United States) New York Cosmos |
| 24 | GK | (United States) Jeremy Figler | 1 April 1992 (aged 22) | | (United States) New York Cosmos |
| 25 | MF | (United States) Hagop Chirishian | 1 November 1989 (aged 25) | | (United States) New York Cosmos |
| 28 | MF | (United States) Jimmy Mulligan | 12 August 1991 (aged 23) | | (United States) New York Cosmos |
| 33 | MF | (United States) Dane Murphy | 15 March 1986 (aged 28) | | (United States) New York Cosmos |
| 77 | FW | (Zimbabwe) Lucky Mkosana | 30 September 1987 (aged 27) | | (United States) New York Cosmos |

== Fixtures and results ==
4 February 2015
15:15 (UTC+8)

| South China (Hong Kong) | 2–2 | (United States) New York Cosmos |
|---|---|---|
| Chan Siu Ki 19'; Awal 67' | Report Report 2 Report 3 Report 4 | Guenzatti 23'; Chirishian (yellow card) 87'; Flores 88'; Szetela (yellow card) 90+4' |
Penalties
| Chan Wai Ho (penalty missed); Itaparica (penalty scored); Sealy (penalty missed); Evan (penalty scored) | 2–4 | (penalty scored) Raúl; (penalty scored) Flores; (penalty scored) Freeman; (penalty missed) Restrepo; (penalty scored) Moffat |

Hong Kong Stadium, So Kon Po, Hong Kong
Attendance: 19,522
Referee: Ng Chiu Kok
