= Zhao Rong =

Chinese footballer

Zhao Rong 赵容
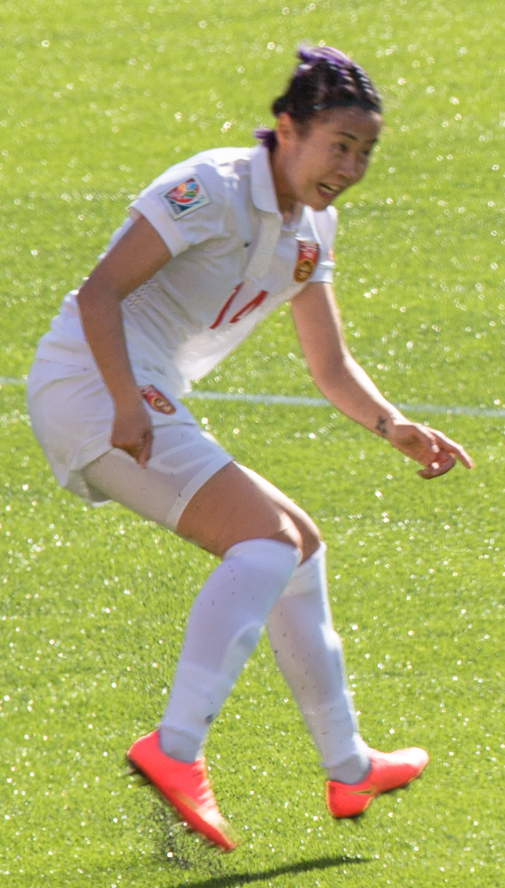

Personal information
- Full name: Zhao Rong
- Date of birth: 2 August 1991 (age 35)
- Place of birth: Anhui, China
- Height: 1.68 m (5 ft 6 in)
- Position: Defender

Senior career*
Years	Team	Apps	(Gls)
2020-2021	Beijing Jingtan	12	(0)

International career^{‡}
2012–2019	China	57	(0)
Medal record
Women's football
Representing China
Asian Games
Silver medal – second place	2018 Palembang	Team
- * Club domestic league appearances and goals ‡ National team caps and goals as of 5 June 2016

Zhao Rong (simplified Chinese: 赵容; traditional Chinese: 趙容; pinyin: Zhào Róng; born 2 August 1991) is a Chinese former football player who played as a forward.

== International goals ==
No.	Date	Venue	Opponent	Score	Result	Competition
1.	20 August 2018	Gelora Sriwijaya Stadium, Palembang, Indonesia	Tajikistan	1–0	16–0	2018 Asian Games
2.	20 August 2018	Gelora Sriwijaya Stadium, Palembang, Indonesia	Tajikistan	3–0	16–0	2018 Asian Games
3.	20 August 2018	Gelora Sriwijaya Stadium, Palembang, Indonesia	Tajikistan	4–0	16–0	2018 Asian Games
4.	20 August 2018	Gelora Sriwijaya Stadium, Palembang, Indonesia	Tajikistan	6–0	16–0	2018 Asian Games
5.	20 August 2018	Gelora Sriwijaya Stadium, Palembang, Indonesia	Tajikistan	13–0	16–0	2018 Asian Games

== Honours ==
China

- Asian Games silver medalist: 2018
- AFC Women's Asian Cup third place: 2014
