= Lydia Mak =

Hongkonger footballer

Personal information
- Full name: Lydia Mak Ho Yi
- Date of birth: 29 April 1999 (age 27)
- Place of birth: Kowloon, Hong Kong
- Position: Defender

Team information
- Current team: Tai Po

Senior career*
Years	Team	Apps	(Gls)
- Tai Po

International career^{‡}
2016	Hong Kong U19	3	(0)
2018–	Hong Kong	3	(0)
- * Club domestic league appearances and goals ‡ National team caps and goals as of 15 September 2019

Lydia Mak Ho Yi (born 29 April 1999) is a Hongkonger footballer who plays as a defender for Hong Kong Women League club Tai Po FC and the Hong Kong women's national team.

== Career ==
Beginning in childhood, she played football with her father. After graduating from Good Hope School in 2017, she attended Hong Kong University of Science and Technology, where she studied physics.

Mak represented Hong Kong at the 2017 AFC U-19 Women's Championship qualification, the 2018 Asian Games, the 2019 EAFF E-1 Football Championship and the 2020 AFC Women's Olympic Qualifying Tournament.

== See also ==
- List of Hong Kong women's international footballers
