= Dhurakij Pundit University International College =

School in Thailand

- วิทยาลัยนานาชาติมหาวิทยาลัยธุรกิจบัณฑิตย์
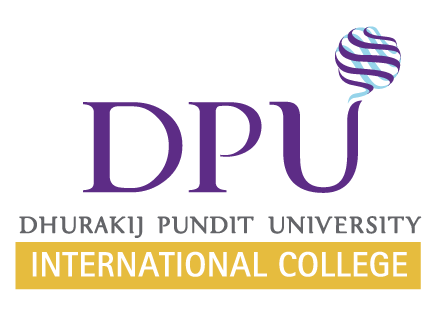
- Other names: DPUIC
- Type: Private University
- President: Varakorn Samakoses]
- Dean: Harald Kraus
- Location: Bangkok, Thailand; 13.870669°N 100.551280°E
- Colours: Gold, purple
- Website: www.dpuic.dpu.ac.th

Dhurakij Pundit University International College (DPUIC) (Thai: วิทยาลัยนานาชาติมหาวิทยาลัยธุรกิจบัณฑิตย์) is the international college set up by Dhurakij Pundit University to meet the increasing demand in Thailand for degree courses of international standards taught in the English language.

== History ==
Starting with a single program in 2004, DPUIC today offers bachelor, master's and doctoral degrees. The bachelor's degree programs run on a two semester basis, with each semester lasting around 15 weeks. The postgraduate programs run in a block course format, with each course running on three consecutive weekends to aid students who are employed.

Enrollments are accepted for both semesters. In 2014 DPUIC changed its academic calendar to align with the ASEAN academic year, and semesters one and two start in August and January respectively.

DPUIC has students from more than 20 countries around the world, with about 50 percent of the students being international. The college also partners with universities in Asia, Europe, America and Australia, giving its students the opportunity to study one or two semesters of their course work at designated universities and transfer credits or obtain double degrees.

== Awards and recognition ==
Dhurakij Pundit University was the first university in Thailand to be awarded with an ISO 9001: 2008 certificate.

DPU was awarded "Excellent Academic Quality Assurance" award by the Thai Ministry of Education, 2008–2009. DPU was the only private university to be given the award.

In 2015 DPUIC was recognized by the United Nations for its contribution to the global Millennium Development Goals project headed in Thailand by the United Nations Development Program.

== International affiliations ==
DPUIC has agreements with more than 90 universities around the world. DPUIC has ongoing exchange programs with:

China
Sanya University
Guizhou Normal University

Japan
Ibaraki University

France
ICN Business School
ISC Paris – Business School

Sweden
Linnaeus University

Vietnam
Hoa Sen University
