= Lau Yun Yi =

Hongkonger footballer

Personal information
- Position: Defender

International career^{‡}
Years	Team	Apps	(Gls)
2013–2015	Hong Kong	6+	(0+)
- ‡ National team caps and goals as of 15 March 2015.

Lau Yun Yi is a Hongkonger footballer who plays as a defender. She has been a member of the Hong Kong women's national team.

== International career ==
Lau Yun Yi capped for Hong Kong at senior level during the 2014 AFC Women's Asian Cup qualification and the 2016 AFC Women's Olympic Qualifying Tournament.

== International goals ==
No.	Date	Venue	Opponent	Score	Result	Competition
1.	23 June 2022	Jalan Besar Stadium, Jalan Besar, Singapore	Singapore	1–0	4–0	Friendly
2.	23 June 2022	Jalan Besar Stadium, Jalan Besar, Singapore	Singapore	2–0	4–0	Friendly
3.	8 April 2023	Hisor Central Stadium, Hisor, Tajikistan	Pakistan	2–0	2–0	2024 AFC Women's Olympic Qualifying Tournament

== See also ==
- List of Hong Kong women's international footballers
