= Po Ching Ying =

Hongkonger footballer

Personal information
- Position: Defender

International career^{‡}
Years	Team	Apps	(Gls)
2007–2019	Hong Kong	7+	(0+)
- ‡ National team caps and goals as of 26 May 2013.

Po Ching Ying is a Hongkonger footballer who plays as a defender. She is a member of the Hong Kong women's national team.

== International career ==
Po Ching Ying capped for Hong Kong at senior level during three AFC Women's Asian Cup qualifications (2008, 2010 and 2014) and the 2012 AFC Women's Olympic Qualifying Tournament.

== See also ==
- List of Hong Kong women's international footballers
