= ProEvents =

Asian event management consultancy firm

- Industry: Sports
- Founded: 1992
- Founder: Chairman: Paul Kam; CEO: Julian Kam
- Services: Tour management Club sponsorship Media and Event Marketing; Merchandising & Licensing; Player Commercial Endorsement
- Website: proevents.com

ProEvents is the leading football promoter in Asia and they are a marketing and event management consultancy with offices in Hong Kong, Malaysia and Singapore.

== History ==
The company was established in Hong Kong in 1992 by Paul J Kam and Julian Kam, a FIFA Licensed Match Agent. Subsequently, two more offices were set up in Singapore and Malaysia in 2000 and 2001 respectively.

The company’s first-ever international football match organised two decades ago was Hong Kong local champions Eastern Athletic Association vs. Japan J-League Nagoya Grampus Eight taken place at the Mongkok Stadium in Hong Kong in 1993. Since then, ProEvents has managed and organised international football matches in the following Asian cities:

Bandar Seri Begawan, Bangkok, Beijing, Busan, Guangzhou, Hangzhou, Hanoi, Hong Kong, Jakarta, Kuantan, Kuala Lumpur, Macao, Manila, Nagoya, Saitama, Seoul, Shanghai, Shenzhen, Singapore, Tokyo, Vancouver and Yiwu.

== Business ==
ProEvents has been organising and promoting international matches for major football clubs as well as national teams, also specialises in club sponsorship and CSR, media and event marketing, merchandising & licensing, player commercial endorsement and professional consultancy in the football industry.

== Clubs and National Teams ==
Over the past 25 years, the company has organised and promoted international events with football clubs such as Arsenal, FC Barcelona, Chelsea, Inter Milan, Liverpool, Manchester City, Manchester United etc. Also national teams such as Argentina, Brazil, China, England, Japan, Malaysia, Thailand etc. ProEvents have been appointed by the Premier League as Official Event Management Partner exclusively to organise the Barclays Asia Trophy in Hong Kong in 2011 and 2013.

== Players ==
The company has worked with a number of high-profile players for commercial endorsement in the region. These players include Lionel Messi, Frank Lampard, Fernando Torres, Fabio Cannavaro, Ahn Jung Hwan, Ryan Giggs, Michael Owen, John Terry, Steven Gerrard, Robert Pires.

== Matches ==
Updated on 16 Oct 2019

1993
Eastern vs Nagoya Grampus Eight	Hong Kong
1994
Eastern vs UC Sampdoria	Hong Kong
China National Team vs UC Sampdoria	China
Indonesia National Team vs UC Sampdoria	Italy
1995
Sing Tao vs UC Sampdoria	Hong Kong
China National Team vs UC Sampdoria	China
Malaysia Selection vs Manchester United	Malaysia
Merdeka Tournament (Bulgaria National Team, Iraq National Team, Malaysia National Team, South Korea National Team, Uzbekistan National Team, Budapesti Vasas Sport Club)	Malaysia
1996
Golden Selection Team vs England National Team	Hong Kong
1997
South China vs Manchester United	Hong Kong
Thailand National Team vs Manchester United	Thailand
Urawa Red Diamonds vs Manchester United	Japan
South China vs Chelsea	Hong Kong
Brunei National Team vs Chelsea	Brunei
Thailand National Team vs Chelsea	Thailand
1999
South China vs Manchester United	Hong Kong
Shanghai Shenhua FC vs Manchester United	China
Thailand National Team vs Arsenal	Thailand
Malaysia National Team vs Arsenal	Malaysia
2000
South China vs Yugoslavia National Team	Hong Kong
2001
Singapore National Team vs Manchester United	Singapore
Thailand National Team vs Manchester United	Thailand
Malaysia National Team vs Manchester United	Malaysia
International Youth Tournament (China, Argentina, Brazil, Japan)	Hong Kong
2002
Malaysia National Team vs Brazil National Team	Malaysia
Slovakia National Team vs Japan National Team	Japan
Thailand National Team vs Leeds United	Thailand
2003
Urawa Red Diamonds vs Feyenoord	Japan
Busan Icons vs Feyenoord	Korea
China National Team vs Brazil National Team	China
International Youth Tournament (Brazil vs Malaysia & Portugal vs Korea)	Malaysia
2004
China National Team vs Finland National Team	China
Urawa Red Diamonds vs Inter Milan	Japan
2005
Honda Cup (Vietnam National Team, SK Bucheon, Indonesia National Team, FC Barcelona B Team)	Vietnam
Hong Kong Representative Team vs Brazil National Team	Hong Kong
2007
Reunification Cup (Bayern Munich, São Paulo, China National Team, FIFA World Stars, Hong Kong celebrities, Mainland China celebrities)	Hong Kong
Urawa Red Diamonds vs Manchester United	Japan
FC Seoul vs Manchester United	Korea
Shenzhen Xiangxue Eisiti vs Manchester United	Macau
Guangzhou Pharmaceutical FC vs Manchester United	China
Mission Hills Invitation XI vs FC Barcelona	Hong Kong
2008
Lunar New Year Cup (Ulsan Hyundai)	Hong Kong
Guangzhou Pharmaceutical FC vs Chelsea	China
Chengdu Blades FC vs Chelsea	Macau
Malaysian Selection vs Chelsea	Malaysia
Argentina Men’s Olympic Team vs. Japan Men’s Olympic Team	Japan
Argentina Women's Olympic Football Team vs. Japan Women's Olympic Football Team	Japan
2009
Malaysian XI vs Manchester United	Malaysia
FC Seoul vs Manchester United	Korea
Hangzhou Greentown FC vs Manchester United	China
2011
Hangzhou Greentown FC vs Arsenal	China
Malaysian XI vs Arsenal	Malaysia
Sunray Cave FC vs Liverpool	China
Malaysian XI vs Liverpool	Malaysia
Malaysian XI vs Chelsea	Malaysia
Thai Premier League All Stars vs Chelsea	Thailand
Barclays Asia Trophy (Chelsea, Aston Villa, Blackburn Rovers, Kitchee)	Hong Kong
2012
Malaysian XI vs Arsenal	Malaysia
Kitchee vs Arsenal	Hong Kong
Malaysian XI vs Manchester City	Malaysia
2013
Nagoya Grampus vs Arsenal	Japan
Urawa Red Diamonds vs Arsenal	Japan
Indonesia National Team vs Arsenal	Indonesia
Singha Thailand All-Star XI vs Chelsea	Thailand
Malaysian XI vs Chelsea	Malaysia
BNI Indonesia All Stars vs Chelsea	Indonesia
Barclays Asia Trophy (Manchester City, Tottenham Hotspurs, Sunderland, South China)	Hong Kong
Merdeka Tournament (Malaysian, Singapore National Team, Thailand National Team, Myanmar)	Malaysia
2014
Kitchee vs Paris Saint-Germain	Hong Kong
HKFA Centennial Celebration Match (Hong Kong vs Argentina)	Hong Kong
2015
Malaysian XI vs Tottenham Hotspurs	Malaysia
Thailand All-Stars vs Chelsea	Thailand
Malaysian XI vs Liverpool	Malaysia
2016
Vancouver International Soccer Challenge (Vancouver Whitecaps FC vs Crystal Palace F.C.)	Canada
2017
Nike Lunar New Year Cup (Kitchee, FC Seoul, Muangthong United, Auckland City)	Hong Kong
Jockey Club Kitchee Centre Challenge Cup (Kitchee vs Tottenham Hotspurs)	Hong Kong
2017 King's Cup (Thailand, Belarus, Burkina Faso, North Korea)	Thailand
2018
2018 International Champions Cup (Atlético Madrid, Arsenal, Paris Saint-Germain)	Singapore
International Friendly Match (Hong Kong vs Thailand)	Hong Kong
2019
TONGHAI FINANCIAL Chinese New Year Cup 2019 (Hong Kong CNY Selection, Sagan Tosu, Shandong Luneng, Auckland City)	Hong Kong
2019 Airmarine Cup (Oman, Singapore, Malaysia, Afghanistan)	Malaysia
Liverpool Legends vs Borussia Dortmund Legends	Hong Kong
2019 King's Cup (Thailand, Curaçao, Vietnam, India)	Thailand
JDT All-Stars Friendly Charity Match (Johor Darul Ta'zim TMJ vs Johor Darul Ta'zim Rest of the World)	Malaysia
2019 International Champions Cup (Manchester United, Inter, Juventus, Tottenham Hotspur)	Singapore
2019 International Champions Cup (Inter vs Juventus)	Nanjing, China
2019 International Champions Cup (Tottenham Hotspur vs Manchester United)	Shanghai, China
