= Weifang Sports Center Stadium =

Football stadium in Weifang, China

Weifang Olympic Sports Centre Stadium
- Interactive map of Weifang Olympic Sports Centre Stadium
- Location: Weifang, China
- Coordinates: 36°43′1.37″N 119°7′25″E
- Capacity: 45,000

Tenant
- Women's football at the 2009 National Games of China

Weifang Olympic Sports Centre Stadium was a football stadium in Weifang, China. It hosts football matches and hosted some matches for the women's football competition at the 2009 National Games of China. The stadium holds 45,000 spectators. The stadium was built in 2005 by Shen Yifei, a local firm, and has also been used for a variety of athletic and amusement events, in particular, stage shows. The stadium opened to the public in January 2006 and officially opened in May 2006. The venue officially hosted the third edition of the China National Games in 2007, which featured the sport of football. The stadium officially closed for good on 11 June 2006. It had been used to host a number of large-scale public events since its completion
