= Chung Pui Ki =

Hong Kong football and futsal player

Personal information
- Full name: Chung Pui Ki
- Date of birth: 2 February 1998 (age 28)
- Place of birth: Sha Tin, Hong Kong
- Position: Defender

Team information
- Current team: P18 IK

Senior career*
| Years | Team | Apps | (Gls) |
| 2018–2019 | Kitchee | | |
| 2019 | Kilmarnock | | |
| 2020–2026 | Kitchee | | |
| 2026– | P18 IK | | |

International career^{‡}
| 2012 | Hong Kong U16 | ? | (0) |
| 2014–2016 | Hong Kong U19 | 3+ | (1) |
| 2015 | Hong Kong (futsal) | ? | (0) |
| 2018– | Hong Kong | 20+ | (3) |
- * Club domestic league appearances and goals as of 1 July 2026 ‡ National team caps and goals as of 1 July 2026

Chung Pui Ki, also known as Vicky Chung (born 2 February 1998), is a Hong Kong footballer who plays as a defender for Swedish Division 2 club P18 IK. She is also a futsal player, and has represented Hong Kong internationally in both football and futsal.

== Club career ==
Chung previously played for Hong Kong Women League club Kitchee, where she served as team captain and helped lead the team to multiple league titles. In June 2026, it was announced she would be moving abroad for a second European stint, joining Swedish side P18 IK, having previously played for Scottish club Kilmarnock in 2019.

== International career ==
Chung Pui Ki has been capped for Hong Kong at senior level in both football and futsal. In football, she represented Hong Kong at the 2013 AFC U-16 Women's Championship, two AFC U-19 Women's Championship editions (2015 and 2017), the 2018 Asian Games and the 2020 AFC Women's Olympic Qualifying Tournament.

She scored her first international goal against India on 21 January 2019 in a friendly match.

In futsal, Chung Pui Ki played for Hong Kong at the 2015 AFC Women's Futsal Championship.

== International goals ==
Scores and results list Hong Kong's goal tally first.

| No. | Date | Venue | Opponent | Score | Result | Competition |
|---|---|---|---|---|---|---|
| 1. | 21 January 2019 | Hong Kong | India | 2–3 | 2–5 | Friendly |
| 2. | 24 September 2021 | JAR Stadium, Tashkent, Uzbekistan | Philippines | 1–1 | 1–2 | 2022 AFC Women's Asian Cup qualification |

== See also ==
- List of Hong Kong women's international footballers
