= Beijing W.F.C. =

- Founded: January 1985; 41 years ago
- Ground: Xiannongtan Stadium, Beijing
- Capacity: 20,000
- President: Man Yanling
- Manager: Yu Yun
- League: Chinese Women's Super League
- 2025: CWSL, 1st of 12 (champions)
| Home colours | Away colours |

Beijing Jingtan Football Club (Chinese: 北京京坛足球俱乐部), commonly referred to as Beijing Women's Football Club (Chinese: 北京女子足球队) or Beijing W.F.C. (Chinese: 北京女足), is a Chinese professional women's football club located in Beijing. They compete in the Chinese Women's Super League, and their home stadium is Xiannongtan Stadium.

== History ==
Beijing Women's Football Team was established in 1985 under the regional sports commission. In 1996 Weikerui Company bought the club which was re-branded as Weikerui Company Women's Football Team. When Weikerui went bankrupt in 1998 the sports commission continued the team, who in 1999 were named Beijing Construction Company Women's Football Team following a three-year, RMB7.8m sponsorship deal.

=== Beijing Enterprises ownership ===
In November 2016, Beijing Enterprises took control of the team and promised an ambitious program of funding and development, aiming to become national champions within three to five years. The club signed a cooperation agreement with the French Football Federation in July 2017, which they hoped would help them replicate the success of the French youth academy at Clairefontaine.

After another disappointing season in 2017, coach Liu Ying was replaced with Kim Björkegren from Swedish champions Linköpings FC. Björkegren named recently retired Elena Sadiku as his fitness coach. Zhao Rong returned to the club after a two-year loan in Changchun. In February 2018 the club announced the signing of Verónica Boquete.

Under Bjorkegren, the club finished sixth in the 2018 Chinese Women's Super League but enjoyed better results in cup competitions as they reached the last four of both the CFA Tournament and CFA Cup. In January 2019, Bjorkegren left the club to be replaced by his former assistant Yu Yun as the new head coach. On 23 February 2019, their foreign players for the 2019 season were announced as South African duo Thembi Kgatlana and Linda Motlhalo.

=== Post-Beijing Enterprises era ===
On 28 September 2025, Beijing Jingtan clinched the title of the 2025 Chinese Women's Super League, after beating title contenders Liaoning Shenbei Hefeng in a 4–0 home victory.

== Players ==
=== Current squad ===
Note: Flags indicate national team as defined under FIFA eligibility rules; some limited exceptions apply. Players may hold more than one non-FIFA nationality.

| No. | Pos. | Nation | Player |
|---|---|---|---|
| 1 | GK | CHN | Pan Hongyan |
| 2 | DF | CHN | He Zhaofen |
| 3 | DF | CHN | Peng Yuxiao |
| 4 | MF | CHN | Zhao Yujie |
| 5 | DF | CHN | Yu Fan |
| 6 | MF | CHN | Ma Xiaolan |
| 7 | FW | CHN | Yao Mengjia |
| 8 | MF | CHN | Sun Pingwei |
| 9 | FW | CHN | Wang Xinling |
| 10 | FW | CHN | Wang Yanwen |
| 11 | FW | CHN | Wang Shanshan |
| 12 | GK | CHN | Chen Minghui |
| 13 | MF | CHN | Li Qingtong |
| 14 | FW | ZAM | Fridah Mukoma |
| 16 | MF | CHN | Liang Wei |
| 17 | DF | CHN | Si Yu |
| 18 | FW | CHN | Zheng Lu |
| 19 | MF | CHN | Zhang Linyan |

| No. | Pos. | Nation | Player |
|---|---|---|---|
| 20 | FW | CHN | Lu Jiayu |
| 22 | DF | CHN | Chen Qiaozhu |
| 23 | GK | CHN | Liu Chen |
| 24 | MF | CHN | Medina Sadik |
| 25 | DF | CHN | Shen Menglu |
| 27 | MF | CHN | Liu Xuanchi |
| 28 | MF | EGY | Mahira Ali Mohmed Ali El Danbouki |
| 29 | FW | BFA | Adama Congo |
| 30 | MF | CHN | Zou Mengyao |
| 31 | GK | CHN | Zhou Jiaqi |
| 32 | DF | CHN | Zeng Yujia |
| 35 | MF | CHN | Zhan Yali |
| 36 | DF | CHN | Zhou Xuanyu |
| 37 | MF | CHN | Zhou Yinuo |
| 38 | FW | CHN | Lin Huan |
| 42 | MF | CHN | Mao Kexin |
| 47 | FW | MLI | Saratou Traoré |

=== Former internationals ===
- (China) Chen Yanhong
- (China) Gu Yasha
- (China) Liu Ailing
- (China) Liu Shanshan
- (China) Ma Xiaoxu
- (China) Wang Chen
- (China) Wang Lingling
- (China) Wang Yan
- (China) Xu Huan
- (China) Zhang Linyan
- (China) Zhao Rong
- (South Africa) Thembi Kgatlana
- (South Africa) Linda Motlhalo
- (Spain) Vero Boquete
- (Sweden) Marija Banusic

== Continental record ==
| Season | Competition | Round | Opponent | Home | Away | Aggregate |
|---|---|---|---|---|---|---|
| 2026–27 | AFC Women's Champions League | Group C | (Philippines) Kaya–Iloilo | 6–0 | | 3rd out of 4 |
| 2026–27 | AFC Women's Champions League | Group C | (Uzbekistan) Nasaf | 2–1 | | 3rd out of 4 |
| 2026–27 | AFC Women's Champions League | Group C | (Australia) Melbourne City | 0–2 | | 3rd out of 4 |
| 2026–27 | AFC Women's Champions League | Quarter-finals | (North Korea) Naegohyang or April 25 | | | |

== Honours ==
League

- Chinese Women's Super League
  - Champions: 1999, 2002, 2025
