= List of Hong Kong women's international footballers =

This is a non-exhaustive list of Hong Kong women's international footballers – association football players who have appeared at least once for the senior Hong Kong women's national football team.

== Players ==
Name	Caps	Goals	National team years	Club(s)
Cham Ching Man	5	1	2018–	(Hong Kong) Happy Valley
Chan Shuk-Chi	1	2	1991	(Hong Kong) Happy Valley
Chan Wing Sze	25	2	2009–	(Hong Kong) Shatin
Chin Lai Hing	–	–	–	–
Cheung Wai Ki	24	9	2013–	(Hong Kong) Citizen
Chu Ling Ling	8	0	2009–	(Hong Kong) Citizen
Chun Ching Hang	6	1	2013–	–
Chung Pui Ki	13	1	2018-	(Hong Kong) Kitchee
Fong Kit Lun	–	–	–	–
Fung Kam Mui	–	–	–	–
Kay Fung	12+	4	2007–	(Hong Kong) Citizen
He Ying	–	–	–	–
Ho Chi Ling	–	–	–	–
Ho Mui Mei	11	2	2018–	(Hong Kong) Citizen
Ho Wan Tung	8	0	2016–	(Hong Kong) Kitchee
Ho Wing Kam	–	–	–	–
Ip Kwok Kan	–	–	–	–
Ip Yik Wing	4	0	2007–2009	
Kwok Ching Man	17	0	2016–	(Hong Kong) Citizen
Kwong Wing Yan	–	–	–	–
Lam Kan Yu	–	–	–	–
Lau Jun Jun	–	–	–	–
Lau Mung King	–	–	–	–
Lau Yui Ching	6	0	2016–	(Hong Kong) Lung Moon
Lau Yun Yi	–	–	–	–
Law Ka-Lai	1	1	1991	-
Lee Wing Yan	15	1	2016–	(Hong Kong) Happy Valley
Leung Wai Nga	–	–	–	–
Li Siu Wa	–	–	–	–
Lung Wing Yan	–	–	–	–
Ma Chak Shun	9	0	2016–	(Hong Kong) Happy Valley
Lydia Mak	3	0	2018–	(Hong Kong) Tai Po
Man Po Kei	–	–	–	–
Ng Cheuk Wai	7	0	2016–	(Hong Kong) Happy Valley
Pauline Ng	6+	1	2007–2013	Retired
Ng Wing Kum	10+	1+	2007–2017	Retired
Ng Yuen Ki	11	0	2014–	(Hong Kong) Chelsea SS (HK)
Pak Yee Kwan	–	–	–	–
Po Ching Ying	–	–	–	–
Sin Chung Yee	19	0	2013–	(Philippines) Manila Digger
Wintina Soo	–	–	–	–
Tang Hoi Man	–	–	–	–
Tsang Pak Tung	1	0	2019–	(Hong Kong) Tai Po
Wai Yuen Ting	16	3	2016–	(Hong Kong) Citizen
Wong Ka Man	–	–	–	–
Wong Man Ching	–	–	–	–
Wong Shuk Fan	–	–	–	–
Wong So Han	21	0	2016–	(Hong Kong) Happy Valley
Woo Lok Ki	3	0	2018–	(Hong Kong) Shatin
Yau Ka Wei	2	2	2003-2006	–
Yiu Hei Man	19	0	2016–	(Hong Kong) Happy Valley
Heidi Yuen	14	1	2016–	(Hong Kong) Citizen
Yuen Ho Yan	–	–	–	–

== See also ==
- Hong Kong women's national football team
