= 2023 Vietnamese Women's National League =

Vietnamese Women's National League
- Season: 2023
- Dates: 16 November – 28 December 2023
- Champions: Ho Chi Minh City (12th title)
- AFC Champions League: Ho Chi Minh City
- Matches: 56
- Goals: 150 (2.68 per match)
- Top goalscorer: Phạm Hải Yến (13 goals)

The 2023 Vietnam Women's National League, known as the Thai Son Bac Cup (Vietnamese: Cúp Thái Sơn Bắc 2023) for sponsorship reasons, was the 26th season of the Vietnamese Women's National League, the professional women's football league in Vietnam. The season commenced on 16 November 2023 and finished on 28 December 2023.

Ho Chi Minh City were the four-time defending champions.

== Changes from previous season ==
The league expanded to 8 clubs from the 2022 season with Sơn La re-joining the league.

== Teams ==
=== Stadiums and locations ===
Locations of the 2023 Women's Football League venues

The league plays in two centralized venues, all from Hanoi. One from Vietnam Youth Football Training Center, located in the Nam Tu Liem district of Hanoi and one from Thanh Trì Stadium, located in the Thanh Tri district.

=== Personnel and kits ===
Team	Manager	Captain	Kit manufacturer	Shirt sponsor
Hanoi	(Vietnam) Nguyễn Anh Tuấn	(Vietnam) Bùi Thúy An	Made by club	LS Cable & System; Thai Son Bac
Hanoi II	(Vietnam) Đặng Quốc Tuấn	(Vietnam) Nguyen Thị Thúy	Made by club	LS Cable & System; Thai Son Bac
Ho Chi Minh City	(Vietnam) Đoàn Thị Kim Chi	(Vietnam) Trần Thị Thùy Trang	(Vietnam) Kamito	LS Cable & System
Ho Chi Minh City II	(Vietnam) Nguyễn Hữu Thắng	(Vietnam) Đoàn Thị Ngọc Phượng	(Vietnam) Kamito	LS Cable & System
Phong Phu Ha Nam	(Vietnam) Phạm Văn Hải	(Vietnam) Nguyễn Thị Tuyết Dung	(Thailand) Grand Sport	Mollis Hanoi
Son La	(Vietnam) Lường Văn Chuyên	(Vietnam) ?	Made by club	
Thai Nguyen T&T	(Vietnam) Đoàn Viết Triều	(Vietnam) Trần Thị Thúy Nga	Made by club	T&T Group
Than KSVN	(Vietnam) Đoàn Minh Hải	(Vietnam) Lê Thị Diễm My	Made by club	Vinacomin

== Standings ==
=== League table ===
Pos	Team	Pld	W	D	L	GF	GA	GD	Pts	Qualification
1	Ho Chi Minh City (C, Q)	14	11	2	1	39	5	+34	35	Qualification to 2024–25 AFC Women's Champions League
2	Than KSVN	14	11	2	1	24	3	+21	35	
3	Hanoi	14	11	1	2	33	6	+27	34	
4	Thai Nguyen T&T	14	7	0	7	25	19	+6	21	
5	Phong Phu Ha Nam	14	7	1	6	19	15	+4	22	
6	Hanoi II	14	3	1	10	6	33	−27	10	
7	Ho Chi Minh City II	14	1	2	11	7	30	−23	5	
8	Son La	14	0	1	13	3	45	−42	1	

Source: VFF
Rules for classification: 1) Points; 2) Head-to-head points; 3) Head-to-head goal difference; 4) Head-to-head goals scored; 5) Goal difference; 6) Goals scored.
(C) Champions; (Q) Qualified for the phase indicated

=== Positions by round ===
Team ╲ Round	1	2	3	4	5	6	7	8	9	10	11	12	13	14
Hanoi	5	4	2	2	4	3	3	2	2	1	1	3	3	3
Hanoi II	3	5	8	6	5	6	6	6	6	6	6	6	6	6
Ho Chi Minh City	4	3	1	1	1	1	1	3	3	3	2	1	1	1
Ho Chi Minh City II	6	8	6	7	7	7	7	7	7	7	7	7	7	7
Phong Phu Ha Nam	1	1	5	4	3	4	4	4	4	4	4	4	4	4
Thai Nguyen T&T	7	6	3	5	6	5	5	5	5	5	5	5	5	5
Than KSVN	2	2	4	3	2	2	2	1	1	2	3	2	2	2
Son La	8	7	7	8	8	8	8	8	8	8	8	8	8	8

Source: VFF
= Leader and qualification to 2024–25 AFC Women's Champions League; = Last place in table

== Results ==
Home \ Away	HN1	HN2	HC1	HC2	PHN	TNT	TKS	SLA
Hanoi	—							
Hanoi II		—						
Ho Chi Minh City			—					
Ho Chi Minh City II				—				
Phong Phu Ha Nam					—			
Thai Nguyen T&T						—		
Than KSVN							—	
Son La								—

Source: VFF (1st leg), VFF (2nd leg)
Legend: Blue = home team win; Yellow = draw; Red = away team win.

== Season statistics ==
As of 23 March 2025

== Awards ==
=== Annual awards ===
Award	Winner	Club
Best Player of the season	(Vietnam) Dương Thị Vân	Than Khoáng Sản Việt Nam
Best Goalkeeper for the season	(Vietnam) Trần Thị Kim Thanh	Ho Chi Minh City
Top scorer	(Vietnam) Phạm Hải Yến (13 goals)	Hanoi
