= 2024 Vietnamese Women's National League =

Vietnamese Women's National League
- Season: 2024
- Dates: 1 May – 2 August
- Champions: Ho Chi Minh City (13th title)
- AFC Champions League: Ho Chi Minh City
- Matches: 56
- Goals: 173 (3.09 per match)
- Top goalscorer: Nguyễn Thị Trúc Hương (14 goals)

The 2024 Vietnam Women's National League, known as the Thai Son Bac Cup (Vietnamese: Cúp Thái Sơn Bắc 2024) for sponsorship reasons, was the 27th season of the Vietnamese Women's National League, the professional women's football league in Vietnam. The season commenced on 1 May 2024 and finished on 2 August 2024.

Ho Chi Minh City were the five-time defending champions.

== Teams ==
=== Stadiums and locations ===
Locations of the 2024 Women's Football League venues

The league plays in any venues unlike previous seasons. The matches at the first leg for the season was played at three stadiums, all located in Bà Rịa–Vũng Tàu, these are Long Tâm Stadium, Tân Hưng Stadium and Bà Rịa Stadium. The second leg was played at the Vietnam Youth Football Training Center, located in the Nam Từ Liêm district of Hanoi.

=== Personnel and kits ===
| Team | Manager | Captain | Kit manufacturer | Shirt sponsor |
|---|---|---|---|---|
| Hanoi | (Vietnam) Đặng Quốc Tuấn | (Vietnam) Phạm Hải Yến | Made by club | LS Cable & System; Thai Son Bac |
| Hanoi II | (Vietnam) Đào Thị Miện | (Vietnam) ? | Made by club | LS Cable & System; Thai Son Bac |
| Ho Chi Minh City | (Vietnam) Đoàn Thị Kim Chi | (Vietnam) Trần Thị Thùy Trang | (Vietnam) Kamito | LS Cable & System |
| Ho Chi Minh City II | (Vietnam) Lưu Ngọc Mai | (Vietnam) ? | (Vietnam) Kamito | LS Cable & System |
| Phong Phu Ha Nam | (Vietnam) Nguyễn Thị Khánh Thu | (Vietnam) Nguyễn Thị Tuyết Dung | (Thailand) Grand Sport | Mollis Hanoi |
| Son La | (Vietnam) Lường Văn Chuyên | (Vietnam) ? | Made by club | |
| Thai Nguyen T&T | (Vietnam) Đoàn Viết Triều | (Vietnam) Trần Thị Thúy Nga | Made by club | T&T Group |
| Than KSVN | (Vietnam) Đoàn Minh Hải | (Vietnam) Lê Thị Diễm My | (Spain) Kelme | Vinacomin |

== Standings ==
=== League table ===
| Pos | Team | Pld | W | D | L | GF | GA | GD | Pts | Qualification |
|---|---|---|---|---|---|---|---|---|---|---|
| 1 | Ho Chi Minh City (C, Q) | 14 | 10 | 3 | 1 | 32 | 9 | +23 | 33 | Qualification to 2025–26 AFC Women's Champions League |
| 2 | Than KSVN | 14 | 9 | 4 | 1 | 36 | 7 | +29 | 31 | |
| 3 | Thai Nguyen T&T | 14 | 9 | 3 | 2 | 30 | 7 | +23 | 30 | |
| 4 | Hanoi | 14 | 9 | 3 | 2 | 36 | 9 | +27 | 30 | |
| 5 | Phong Phu Ha Nam | 14 | 5 | 2 | 7 | 18 | 12 | +6 | 17 | |
| 6 | Ho Chi Minh City II | 14 | 2 | 2 | 10 | 5 | 37 | −32 | 8 | |
| 7 | Hanoi II | 14 | 2 | 1 | 11 | 10 | 44 | −34 | 7 | |
| 8 | Son La | 14 | 1 | 0 | 13 | 6 | 48 | −42 | 3 | |

Source: VFF
Rules for classification: 1) Points; 2) Head-to-head points; 3) Head-to-head goal difference; 4) Head-to-head goals scored; 5) Goal difference; 6) Goals scored.
(C) Champions; (Q) Qualified for the phase indicated

=== Positions by round ===
| Team ╲ Round | 1 | 2 | 3 | 4 | 5 | 6 | 7 | 8 | 9 | 10 | 11 | 12 | 13 | 14 |
|---|---|---|---|---|---|---|---|---|---|---|---|---|---|---|
| Hanoi | 4 | 3 | 2 | 2 | 2 | 2 | 2 | 3 | 3 | 3 | 2 | 2 | 4 | 3 |
| Hanoi II | 7 | 7 | 8 | 8 | 8 | 8 | 8 | 8 | 8 | 8 | 8 | 8 | 7 | 6 |
| Ho Chi Minh City | 3 | 2 | 1 | 1 | 1 | 1 | 1 | 1 | 1 | 1 | 1 | 1 | 1 | 1 |
| Ho Chi Minh City II | 8 | 8 | 6 | 6 | 6 | 6 | 6 | 6 | 6 | 6 | 6 | 6 | 6 | 7 |
| Phong Phu Ha Nam | 2 | 4 | 5 | 5 | 5 | 5 | 5 | 5 | 5 | 5 | 5 | 5 | 5 | 4 |
| Thai Nguyen T&T | 1 | 1 | 3 | 3 | 4 | 3 | 3 | 2 | 2 | 2 | 4 | 4 | 3 | 5 |
| Than KSVN | 5 | 5 | 4 | 4 | 3 | 4 | 4 | 4 | 4 | 4 | 3 | 3 | 2 | 2 |
| Son La | 6 | 6 | 7 | 7 | 7 | 7 | 7 | 7 | 7 | 7 | 7 | 7 | 8 | 8 |

| Leader and qualification to 2025–26 AFC Women's Champions League |
| Last place in table |

Source: VFF

== Results ==
| Home \ Away | HN1 | HN2 | HC1 | HC2 | PHN | TNT | TKS | SLA |
|---|---|---|---|---|---|---|---|---|
| Hanoi | — | | | 3–0 | | | 1–0 | |
| Hanoi II | 0–5 | — | | | 0–4 | | 1–4 | |
| Ho Chi Minh City | | 5–0 | — | 5–0 | | | | 4–0 |
| Ho Chi Minh City II | | | | — | | 0–4 | | 2–1 |
| Phong Phu Ha Nam | 0–1 | 3–0 | | | — | | | |
| Thai Nguyen T&T | | 2–0 | 1–3 | | | — | | 5–0 |
| Than KSVN | | | 0–0 | | 1–0 | 0–0 | — | |
| Son La | 0–2 | | | | 0–3 | | | — |

Source: VFF (1st leg), VFF (2nd leg)
Legend: Blue = home team win; Yellow = draw; Red = away team win.

== Season statistics ==
As of 23 March 2025

== Awards ==
=== Annual awards ===
| Award | Winner | Club |
|---|---|---|
| Best Player of the season | (Vietnam) Nguyễn Thị Tuyết Ngân | Ho Chi Minh City |
| Best Goalkeeper for the season | (Vietnam) Khổng Thị Hằng | Than Khoang San Viet Nam |
| Top scorer | (Vietnam) Nguyễn Thị Trúc Hương (14 goals) | Than Khoang San Viet Nam |
