= 2020 Vietnamese Women's National League =

23rd season of the Vietnamese Women's Football Championship

Vietnamese Women's National League
- Season: 2020
- Dates: 22 September – 13 December 2020
- Champions: Ho Chi Minh City I (9th title)
- Matches: 56
- Goals: 173 (3.09 per match)
- Top goalscorer: Phạm Hải Yến (14 goals)
- Biggest home win: Ho Chi Minh City I 6–0 Son La (25 September 2020)
- Biggest away win: Hanoi II Watabe 0–6 Hanoi I Watabe (22 September 2020); Ho Chi Minh City II 0–6 Ho Chi Minh City I (22 September 2020)
- Highest scoring: Phong Phu Ha Nam 6–3 Son La (2 December 2020)
- Longest winning run: 8 matches Ho Chi Minh City I
- Longest unbeaten run: 14 matches Ho Chi Minh City I
- Longest winless run: 14 matches Ho Chi Minh City II
- Longest losing run: 7 matches Ho Chi Minh City II
- All statistics correct as of 13 December 2020.

The 2020 Vietnamese Women's National League (referred to as the Thai Son Bac Cup for sponsorship reasons) was the 23rd season of Vietnamese Women's National League, a professional women's football league in Vietnam. The season began on 22 September 2020 and finished on 13 December 2020. Defending champions Ho Chi Minh City I won their 9th title, while picking up their first ever domestic double.

The season was set to start in August but was postponed due to the effects of the COVID-19 pandemic.

== Teams ==
=== Personnel and kits ===
Team	Manager	Captain	Shirt sponsor
Hanoi I Watabe	(Vietnam) Nguyễn Anh Tuấn	(Vietnam) Bùi Thúy An	LS Cable & System; Watabe Wedding
Hanoi II Watabe	(Vietnam) Đặng Quốc Tuấn	(Vietnam) Nguyễn Thị Thủy	LS Cable & System; Watabe Wedding
Ho Chi Minh City I	(Vietnam) Đoàn Thị Kim Chi	(Vietnam) Huỳnh Như	LS Cable & System
Ho Chi Minh City II	(Vietnam) Nguyễn Quốc Nam	(Vietnam) Phạm Thúy An	LS Cable & System
Phong Phu Ha Nam	(Vietnam) Phạm Văn Hải	(Vietnam) Nguyễn Thị Tuyết Dung	Phong Phu Corporation
Son La	(Vietnam) Lường Văn Chuyên	(Vietnam) Nguyễn Thị Hồng Cúc	LS Cable & System
Thai Nguyen T&T	(Vietnam) Đoàn Việt Triều	(Vietnam) Nguyễn Thị Bích Ngọc	T&T Group
Than KSVN	(Vietnam) Đoàn Minh Hải	(Vietnam) Dương Thị Vân	Vinacomin

=== Managerial changes ===
Team	Outgoing manager	Manner of departure	Date of vacancy	Position in table	Incoming manager	Date of appointment
Phong Phu Ha Nam	(Vietnam) Nguyễn Thế Cường	League ban	7 October 2020	4th	(Vietnam) Phạm Văn Hải	7 October 2020

== League table ==
Pos	Team	Pld	W	D	L	GF	GA	GD	Pts
1	Ho Chi Minh City I (C)	14	13	1	0	47	4	+43	40 (Note: Phong Phu Ha Nam were handed a 0–3 loss after players walked off the pitch against Ho Chi Minh City I on 6 October 2020.)
2	Hanoi I Watabe	14	10	2	2	41	8	+33	32
3	Than KSVN	14	10	1	3	25	9	+16	31
4	Phong Phu Ha Nam	14	6	3	5	22	21	+1	21
5	Thai Nguyen T&T	14	4	4	6	13	30	−17	16
6	Hanoi II Watabe	14	3	1	10	7	24	−17	10
7	Son La	14	2	1	11	15	46	−31	7
8	Ho Chi Minh City II	14	0	3	11	3	31	−28	3

Updated to match(es) played on 13 December 2020. Source: VFF
Rules for classification: 1) Points; 2) Head-to-head points; 3) Head-to-head goal difference; 4) Head-to-head goals scored; 5) Goal difference; 6) Goals scored.
(C) Champions

== Results ==
Home \ Away	HN1	HN2	HC1	HC2	PHN	SON	TNT	TKS
Hanoi I Watabe		3–0	1–1	4–0	2–1	5–1	4–0	1–2
Hanoi II Watabe	0–6		–	1–0	0–2	0–1	2–2	0–1
Ho Chi Minh City I	2–1	1–0		–	3–0 (Note: Phong Phu Ha Nam were handed a 0–3 loss by the Disciplinary Committee after players walked off the pitch against Ho Chi Minh City I on 6 October 2020.)	4–0	6–1	3–1
Ho Chi Minh City II	0–4	0–2	0–6		1–1	2–2	0–0	0–2
Phong Phu Ha Nam	0–1	0–1	0–3	2–0		5–3	3–3	0–2
Son La	0–4	0–2	0–6	1–0	3–6		2–4	1–4
Thai Nguyen T&T	0–5	1–0	0–4	1–0	0–0	–		0–2
Than KSVN	1–1	3–0	0–1	2–0	–	–	3–1	

Updated to match(es) played on 13 December 2020. Source: vff.org.vn
Legend: Blue = home team win; Yellow = draw; Red = away team win.

== Positions by round ==
Team ╲ Round	1	2	3	4	5	6	7	8	9	10	11	12	13	14
Hanoi I Watabe	2	2	2	2	2	2	2	2	2	2	2	2	2	2
Hanoi II Watabe	8	6	8	6	6	5	6	6	6	6	6	6	6	6
Ho Chi Minh City I	1	1	1	1	1	1	1	1	1	1	1	1	1	1
Ho Chi Minh City II	7	7	6	7	7	7	7	7	7	8	8	8	8	8
Phong Phu Ha Nam	5	5	4	4	4	4	4	4	4	4	4	4	4	4
Son La	6	8	7	8	8	8	8	8	8	7	7	7	7	7
Thai Nguyen T&T	4	4	5	5	5	6	5	5	5	5	5	5	5	5
Than KSVN	3	3	3	3	3	3	3	3	3	3	3	3	3	3

= Leader; = Last place in table

== Season progress ==
Team ╲ Round	1	2	3	4	5	6	7	8	9	10	11	12	13	14
Hanoi I Watabe	W	W	W	D	W	D	W	W	W	W	W	L	W	L
Hanoi II Watabe	L	L	L	W	L	W	L	L	L	D	L	W	L	L
Ho Chi Minh City I	W	W	W	W	W	D	W	W	W	W	W	W	W	W
Ho Chi Minh City II	L	L	D	L	D	L	L	L	L	L	L	L	D	L
Phong Phu Ha Nam	D	L	W	W	L	W	W	D	W	L	W	L	D	L
Son La	L	L	D	L	L	L	L	L	L	W	L	L	L	W
Thai Nguyen T&T	D	W	L	L	D	L	W	D	L	D	L	W	L	W
Than KSVN	W	W	L	D	W	W	L	W	W	L	W	W	W	W

Updated to match(es) played on 13 December 2020. Source: VFF
W = Win; D = Draw; L = Lose

=== Schedule ===
- Details (in Vietnamese): https://vff.org.vn/lich-truyen-hinh-truc-tiep-luot-di-giai-bong-da-nu-vdqg-cup-thai-son-bac-2020/

== Season statistics ==
As of 13 December 2020

=== Top scorers ===
Rank	Player	Club	Goals
1	(Vietnam) Phạm Hải Yến	Hanoi I Watabe	14
2	(Vietnam) Nguyễn Thị Tuyết Dung	Phong Phu Ha Nam	13
3	(Vietnam) Nguyễn Thị Hồng Cúc	Son La	9
4	(Vietnam) Nguyễn Thị Vạn	Than KSVN	8
5	(Vietnam) Huỳnh Như	Ho Chi Minh City I	7
5	(Vietnam) Nguyễn Thị Tuyết Ngân	Ho Chi Minh City I	7
7	(Vietnam) Lê Hoài Lương	Ho Chi Minh City I	6
8	(Vietnam) Ngân Thị Vạn Sự	Hanoi I Watabe	5
8	(Vietnam) Hồ Thị Quỳnh	Hanoi I Watabe	5

=== Hat-tricks ===
Player	For	Against	Score	Date
(Vietnam) Huỳnh Như	Hi Chi Minh City I	Son La	6–0	25 September 2020
(Vietnam) Nguyễn Thị Tuyết Dung^{4}	Phong Phu Ha Nam	Son La	5–3	10 October 2020
(Vietnam) Nguyễn Thị Vạn	Than KSVN	Son La	3–1	21 November 2020
(Vietnam) Nguyễn Thị Tuyết Dung^{5}	Phong Phu Ha Nam	Son La	6–3	2 December 2020
(Vietnam) Phạm Hải Yến	Hanoi I Watabe	Son La	5–1	9 December 2020

Notes

^{4} Player scored 4 goals
^{5} Player scored 5 goals

=== Clean sheets ===
Rank	Player	Club	Clean sheets
1	(Vietnam) Trần Thị Kim Thanh	Ho Chi Minh City I	9
2	(Vietnam) Đào Thị Kiều Oanh	Hanoi I Watabe	8

== Awards ==
=== Annual awards ===
Award	Winner	Club
Best Player of the Tournament	(Vietnam) Huỳnh Như	Ho Chi Minh City I
Best Goalkeeper for the Tournament	(Vietnam) Trần Thị Kim Thanh	Ho Chi Minh City I
Best Goalscorer of the Tournament	(Vietnam) Phạm Hải Yến (14 goals)	Hanoi I Watabe

== See also ==
- 2020 Women's Vietnamese Cup
