= 2022 Vietnamese Women's National League =

Vietnamese Women's National League
- Season: 2022
- Dates: 30 August – 30 October 2022
- Champions: Ho Chi Minh City (11th title)
- Matches: 42
- Goals: 105 (2.5 per match)
- Top goalscorer: Vũ Thị Hoa (9 goals)
- Biggest home win: Hanoi 5–0 Hanoi II (3 September)
- Biggest away win: Ho Chi Minh City II 0–6 Ho Chi Minh City (4 September)
- Highest scoring: Ho Chi Minh City II 0–6 Ho Chi Minh City (4 September)
- Longest winning run: 6 games Hanoi
- Longest unbeaten run: 12 games Ho Chi Minh City
- Longest winless run: 12 games Ho Chi Minh City II
- Longest losing run: 11 games Ho Chi Minh City II

The 2022 Vietnam Women's National League, known as the Thai Son Bac Cup (Vietnamese: Cúp Thái Sơn Bắc 2022) for sponsorship reasons, was the 25th season of the Vietnamese Women's National League, the professional women's football league in Vietnam. The season commenced on 30 August 2022 and finished on 30 October 2022.

Ho Chi Minh City were the three-time defending champions.

== Changes from previous season ==
The league expanded to 7 clubs from the 2021 season with Hanoi and Ho Chi Minh City fielding their second teams.

=== Name changes ===
Due to the end of the sponsorship deal with Watabe Wedding, Hanoi removed Watabe from their name.

== Teams ==
Locations of the 2022 Women's Football League venues

=== Stadiums and locations ===
The league plays in centralized venues as in previous seasons. The matches for the first half of the season was played at the Vietnam Youth Football Training Center, located in the Nam Tu Liem district of Hanoi. The second half was played at Ha Nam Stadium in Phu Ly.

=== Personnel and kits ===
Team	Manager	Captain	Kit manufacturer	Shirt sponsor
Hanoi	(South Korea) Jeong Sung-chun	(Vietnam) Bùi Thúy An	Made by club	LS Cable & System; Thai Son Bac
Hanoi II	(Vietnam) Đặng Quốc Tuấn	(Vietnam) Nguyễn Thị Thúy	Made by club	LS Cable & System; Thai Son Bac
Ho Chi Minh City	(Vietnam) Đoàn Thị Kim Chi	(Vietnam) Trần Thị Thùy Trang	Made by club	LS Cable & System
Ho Chi Minh City II	(Vietnam) Nguyễn Hữu Thắng	(Vietnam) Đoàn Thị Ngọc Phượng	Made by club	LS Cable & System
Phong Phu Ha Nam	(Vietnam) Phạm Văn Hải	(Vietnam) Nguyễn Thị Tuyết Dung	Grand Sport	Mollis Hanoi
Thai Nguyen T&T	(Vietnam) Đoàn Viết Triều	(Vietnam) Trần Thị Thúy Nga	Made by club	T&T Group
Than KSVN	(Vietnam) Đoàn Minh Hải	(Vietnam) Lê Thị Diễm My	Made by club	Vinacomin

== Standings ==
=== League table ===
Pos	Team	Pld	W	D	L	GF	GA	GD	Pts
1	Ho Chi Minh City (C)	12	9	3	0	28	6	+22	30
2	Hanoi	12	8	2	2	25	3	+22	26
3	Than KSVN	12	6	3	3	17	9	+8	21
4	Thai Nguyen T&T	12	5	4	3	18	10	+8	19
5	Phong Phu Ha Nam	12	5	2	5	13	15	−2	17
6	Hanoi II	12	1	1	10	2	28	−26	4
7	Ho Chi Minh City II	12	0	1	11	2	34	−32	1

Source: VFF
Rules for classification: 1) Points; 2) Head-to-head points; 3) Head-to-head goal difference; 4) Head-to-head goals scored; 5) Goal difference; 6) Goals scored.
(C) Champions

=== Positions by round ===
Team ╲ Round	1	2	3	4	5	6	7	8	9	10	11	12	13	14
Hanoi	1	2	2	3	3	3	2	3	2	2	2	1	2	2
Hanoi II	6	6	6	6	6	6	6	6	6	6	6	6	6	6
Ho Chi Minh City	2	1	1	1	1	1	1	1	1	1	1	2	1	1
Ho Chi Minh City II	7	7	7	7	7	7	7	7	7	7	7	7	7	7
Phong Phu Ha Nam	5	5	5	4	4	5	5	5	5	4	4	5	4	5
Thai Nguyen T&T	4	3	3	2	2	2	4	4	4	5	5	4	5	4
Than KSVN	3	4	4	5	5	4	3	2	3	3	3	3	3	3

Source: VFF
= Leader; = Last place in table

== Results ==
Home \ Away	HN1	HN2	HC1	HC2	PHN	TNT	TKS
Hanoi	—	5–0	0–0	4–0	2–0	1–0	0–0
Hanoi II	0–5	—	0–3	1–0	0–1	0–3	0–1
Ho Chi Minh City	2–1	2–0	—	5–1	2–0	1–1	2–1
Ho Chi Minh City II	0–3	1–1	0–6	—	0–1	0–2	0–4
Phong Phu Ha Nam	0–2	2–0	1–3	2–0	—	0–0	1–2
Thai Nguyen T&T	0–2	2–0	1–2	4–0	2–2	—	2–1
Than KSVN	1–0	3–0	0–0	1–0	2–3	1–1	—

Source: VFF
Legend: Blue = home team win; Yellow = draw; Red = away team win.

== Season statistics ==
As of 30 October 2022

=== Top scorers ===
Rank	Player	Club	Goals
1	(Vietnam) Vũ Thị Hoa	Hanoi	9
2	(Vietnam) Lê Thị Thùy Trang	Thai Nguyen T&T	7
3	(Vietnam) Trần Thị Thùy Trang	Ho Chi Minh City	6
4	(Vietnam) Ngọc Minh Chuyên	Thai Nguyen T&T	5
4	(Vietnam) Phạm Hải Yến	Hanoi	5
6	(Vietnam) Ngân Thị Vạn Sự	Hanoi	4
6	(Vietnam) Tạ Thị Thủy	Phong Phu Ha Nam	4
8	(Vietnam) Ngô Thị Hồng Nhung	Ho Chi Minh City	3
8	(Vietnam) Nguyễn Thị Thúy Hằng	Than KSVN	3
8	(Vietnam) Nguyễn Thị Vạn	Than KSVN	3

Source: Soccerway

==== Hat-tricks ====
Player	For	Against	Result	Date
(Vietnam) Vũ Thị Hoa	Hanoi	Ho Chi Minh City II	4–0 (H)	31 August 2022
(Vietnam) Ngân Thị Vạn Sự	Hanoi	Hanoi II	5–0 (H)	3 September 2022
(Vietnam) Ngọc Minh Chuyên	Thai Nguyen T&T	Ho Chi Minh City II	4–0 (H)	21 October 2022

== Awards ==
=== Annual awards ===
Award	Winner	Club
Best Player of the season	(Vietnam) Trần Thị Thùy Trang	Ho Chi Minh City
Best Goalkeeper for the season	(Vietnam) Đào Thị Kiều Oanh	Hanoi
Top scorer	(Vietnam) Vũ Thị Hoa (9 goals)	Hanoi
