= 2025 Vietnamese Women's National League =

Women's National League
- Season: 2025
- Dates: 4 September – 13 October
- Champions: Ho Chi Minh City I 14th title 7th title in a row
- AFC Champions League: Ho Chi Minh City I
- Matches: 30
- Goals: 63 (2.1 per match)
- Top goalscorer: Phạm Hải Yến (6 goals)
- Best goalkeeper: Khổng Thị Hằng
- Biggest home win: Hanoi 5–1 Ho Chi Minh City II (9 October 2025)
- Biggest away win: Ho Chi Minh City II 0–7 Ho Chi Minh City I (5 September 2025)
- Highest scoring: Ho Chi Minh City II 0–7 Ho Chi Minh City I
- Longest winning run: Ho Chi Minh City I (4 matches)
- Longest unbeaten run: Hanoi (6 matches)
- Longest winless run: Ho Chi Minh City II (8 matches)
- Longest losing run: Ho Chi Minh City II (8 matches)

The 2025 Vietnamese Women's National League (Vietnamese: Giải bóng đá nữ Vô địch quốc gia 2025) (referred to as the 2025 Vietnamese Women's National League - Thái Sơn Bắc Cup for sponsorship reasons, Vietnamese: Giải Bóng đá nữ Vô địch quốc gia - Cúp Thái Sơn Bắc 2025) was the 28th season of the Vietnamese Women's National League since it was formed in 1998. The season began on 4 September and ended on 13 October followed by first leg from 4 to 21 September and second leg from 26 September to 13 October, respectively.

After Ho Chi Minh City I's 0–0 draw to Hanoi, Ho Chi Minh City I were confirmed to have won their seventh consecutive and fourteenth overall title.

== Teams ==
Hanoi II and Son La did not enter the league this season, thus reduced the participating teams from 8 to 6.

=== Stadiums and locations ===
Locations of the 2025 Vietnamese Women's National League venues

On this season, both legs are played at a centralized venue on any matches, two stadiums, PVF Stadium and Thanh Trì Stadium are used for this season.

=== Personnel and kits ===
Team	Manager	Captain	Kit manufacturer	Shirt sponsor
Hanoi	(Vietnam) Đặng Quốc Tuấn	(Vietnam) Phạm Hải Yến	Made by club	None
Ho Chi Minh City I	(Vietnam) Đoàn Thị Kim Chi	(Vietnam) Chương Thị Kiều	(Vietnam) Kamito	LS Cable & System
Ho Chi Minh City II	(Vietnam) Lưu Ngọc Mai	(Vietnam) Nguyễn Ngọc Thanh Như	(Vietnam) Vina Authentic	LS Cable & System
Phong Phu Ha Nam	(Vietnam) Nguyễn Thị Khánh Thu	(Vietnam) Nguyễn Thị Tuyết Dung	Made by club	Mollis Hanoi
Thai Nguyen T&T	(Vietnam) Đoàn Viết Triều	(Vietnam) Trần Thị Thúy Nga	(Spain) Kelme	T&T Group
Than KSVN	(Vietnam) Đoàn Minh Hải	(Vietnam) Lê Thị Diễm My	(Spain) Kelme	Vinacomin

== Foreign players ==
=== Dual nationality Vietnamese players ===
Beginning of this season, teams are now allowed to register maximum of 2 foreign overseas Vietnamese players.

On this season, there were no players registered as dual nationality.

- Players name in **bold** indicates the player was registered after the start of the season.
- Player's name in italics indicates Overseas Vietnamese players whom have obtained a Vietnamese passport and citizenship, therefore being considered as local players.

Club	Player 1	Player 2
Hanoi		
Ho Chi Minh City I		
Ho Chi Minh City II		
Phong Phu Ha Nam		
Thai Nguyen T&T		
Than KSVN		

== League table ==
Pos	Team	Pld	W	D	L	GF	GA	GD	Pts	Qualification
1	Ho Chi Minh City I (C)	10	6	3	1	18	4	+14	21	Qualification for the Champions League group stage
2	Hanoi	10	5	4	1	15	6	+9	19	
3	Than KSVN	10	5	4	1	12	5	+7	19	
4	Thai Nguyen T&T	10	5	2	3	13	9	+4	17	
5	Phong Phu Ha Nam	10	1	2	7	3	12	−9	5	
6	Ho Chi Minh City II	10	0	1	9	1	26	−25	1	

Source: VFF
Rules for classification: 1) Points; 2) Head-to-head points; 3) Head-to-head goal difference; 4) Head-to-head goals scored; 5) Goal difference; 6) Goals scored; 7) Disciplinary points.
(C) Champions

== Matches ==
Home \ Away	HAN	HC1	HC2	PHN	TNT	TKS
Hanoi	—	0–0	5–1	1–0	0–1	1–0
Ho Chi Minh City I	2–2	—	3–0	1–0	2–0	0–0
Ho Chi Minh City II	0–2	0–7	—	0–1	0–1	0–4
Phong Phu Ha Nam	1–3	0–1	0–1	—	1–2	0–1
Thai Nguyen T&T	0–0	1–2	2–0	3–0	—	2–2
Than KSVN	1–1	1–0	1–0	0–0	2–1	—

Source: VFF
Legend: Blue = home team win; Yellow = draw; Red = away team win.

=== Positions by round ===
Team ╲ Round	1	2	3	4	5	6	7	8	9	10
Hanoi	2	3	2	1	1	1	3	3	2	2
Ho Chi Minh City I	1	1	1	2	2	2	1	1	1	1
Ho Chi Minh City II	6	6	6	6	6	6	6	6	6	6
Phong Phu Ha Nam	5	5	5	5	5	5	5	5	5	5
Thai Nguyen T&T	3	4	4	4	3	4	4	4	4	4
Than KSVN	4	2	3	3	4	3	2	2	3	3

Winner and qualification to AFC Women's Champions League
Last place in table

Source: VFF

== Season statistics ==
=== Top scorers ===
Rank	Player	Club	Goals
1	(Vietnam) Phạm Hải Yến	Hanoi	**6**

== Awards ==
=== Annual awards ===
Award	Winner	Club
Player of the Season	(Vietnam) Trần Thị Thùy Trang	Ho Chi Minh City I
Goalkeeper of the Season	(Vietnam) Khổng Thị Hằng	Than KSVN
Award	Club	
Rising Star award	Ho Chi Minh City I	
