= 2021 Vietnamese Women's National League =

Vietnamese Women's National League
- Season: 2021
- Dates: 13–25 November 2021
- Champions: Ho Chi Minh City (10th title)
- Matches: 10
- Goals: 33 (3.3 per match)
- Top goalscorer: Huynh Nhu (7 goals)
- Biggest home win: Hanoi Watabe 4–1 Phong Phu Ha Nam (22 November 2021)
- Biggest away win: Thai Nguyen T&T 1–4 Hanoi Watabe (19 November 2021); Thai Nguyen T&T 1–4 Ho Chi Minh City (22 November 2021)
- Longest winning run: 4 matches Ho Chi Minh City
- Longest unbeaten run: 4 matches Ho Chi Minh City
- Longest winless run: 4 matches Phong Phu Ha Nam
- Longest losing run: 4 matches Phong Phu Ha Nam
- All statistics correct as of 4 February 2022.

The 2021 Vietnamese Women's National League (referred to as the Thai Son Bac Cup for sponsorship reasons) was the 24th season of Vietnamese Women's National League, the professional women's football league in Vietnam. The season began on 13 November 2021 and finished on 25 November 2021. Defending champions Ho Chi Minh City won their 10th title.

The season was set to start in May but was postponed due to the effects of the COVID-19 pandemic. Due to the busy national team schedule with Women's Asian Cup qualification and the postponement of the Southeast Asian Games, it was decided to hold a condensed round-robin tournament in November with just 5 teams.

== Teams ==
The league was expected to expand to 9 clubs from the 2020 season with Phong Phu Ha Nam fielding a second team. However, after the initial start was postponed, Son La withdrew. Hanoi Watabe, Ho Chi Minh City and Phong Phu Ha Nam later decided to not field their second teams.

=== Personnel and kits ===
Team	Manager	Captain	Shirt sponsor
Hanoi Watabe	(South Korea) Jeong Sung-chun	(Vietnam) Bùi Thúy An	LS Cable & System; Watabe Wedding; Thai Son Bac
Ho Chi Minh City	(Vietnam) Đoàn Thị Kim Chi	(Vietnam) Huỳnh Như	LS Cable & System
Phong Phu Ha Nam	(Vietnam) Phạm Văn Hải	(Vietnam) Nguyễn Thị Tuyết Dung	Phong Phu Corporation
Thai Nguyen T&T	(Vietnam) Đoàn Việt Triều	(Vietnam) Nguyễn Thị Bích Ngọc	T&T Group
Than KSVN	(Vietnam) Đoàn Minh Hải	(Vietnam) Dương Thị Vân	Vinacomin

=== Managerial changes ===
Team	Outgoing manager	Manner of departure	Date of vacancy	Position in table	Incoming manager	Date of appointment
Hanoi Watabe	(Vietnam) Nguyễn Anh Tuấn	Mutual consent	May 2021	Pre-season	(South Korea) Jeong Sung-chun	May 2021

== League table ==
Pos	Team	Pld	W	D	L	GF	GA	GD	Pts
1	Ho Chi Minh City (C)	4	4	0	0	10	2	+8	12
2	Hanoi Watabe	4	3	0	1	9	4	+5	9
3	Than KSVN	4	2	0	2	5	4	+1	6
4	Thai Nguyen T&T	4	1	0	3	6	12	−6	3
5	Phong Phu Ha Nam	4	0	0	4	3	11	−8	0

Updated to match(es) played on 25 November 2021. Source: VFF
Rules for classification: 1) Points; 2) Head-to-head points; 3) Head-to-head goal difference; 4) Head-to-head goals scored; 5) Goal difference; 6) Goals scored.
(C) Champions

== Results ==
Home \ Away	HN1	HC1	PHN	TNT	TKS
Hanoi Watabe		–	4–1	–	1–0
Ho Chi Minh City	2–0		2–1	–	–
Phong Phu Ha Nam	–	–		1–3	0–2
Thai Nguyen T&T	1–4	1–4	–		–
Than KSVN	–	0–2	–	3–1	

Updated to match(es) played on 25 November 2021. Source: VFF
Legend: Blue = home team win; Yellow = draw; Red = away team win.

== Positions by round ==
Team ╲ Round	1	2	3	4	5
Hanoi Watabe	2	3	1	1	2
Ho Chi Minh City	1	1	2	2	1
Phong Phu Ha Nam	4	4	5	5	5
Thai Nguyen T&T	3	2	3	4	4
Than KSVN	5	5	4	3	3

Source: VFF
= Leader; = Last place in table

== Season progress ==
Team ╲ Round	1	2	3	4	5
Hanoi Watabe	W	X	W	W	L
Ho Chi Minh City	W	W	X	W	W
Phong Phu Ha Nam	L	L	L	L	X
Thai Nguyen T&T	X	W	L	L	L
Than KSVN	L	L	W	X	W

Updated to match(es) played on 25 November 2021. Source: VFF
W = Win; D = Draw; L = Lose

== Season statistics ==
As of 25 November 2021

=== Top scorers ===
Rank	Player	Club	Goals
1	(Vietnam) Huynh Nhu	Ho Chi Minh City	7
2	(Vietnam) Thai Thi Thao	Hanoi Watabe	4
3	(Vietnam) Lo Thi Hoai	Thai Nguyen T&T	2
3	(Vietnam) Ngan Thi Van Su	Hanoi Watabe	2
3	(Vietnam) Ngoc Minh Chuyen	Thai Nguyen T&T	2
3	(Vietnam) Nguyen Thi Van	Than KSVN	2
3	(Vietnam) Pham Hai Yen	Hanoi Watabe	2
8	12 players		1

=== Hat-tricks ===
Player	For	Against	Score	Date
(Vietnam) Huynh Nhu	Hi Chi Minh City	Thai Nguyen T&T	4–1 (A)	22 November 2021

=== Clean sheets ===
Rank	Player	Club	Clean sheets
1	(Vietnam) Tran Thi Kim Thanh	Ho Chi Minh City	2
2	(Vietnam) Đào Thị Kiều Oanh	Hanoi Watabe	1
2	(Vietnam) Khong Thi Hang	Than KSVN	1
