= Football at the 2021 SEA Games – Women's team squads =

Below are the squads for the 2021 SEA Games women's football tournament, hosted by Vietnam, which took place from 11 May to 21 May 2022.

== Group A ==
=== Vietnam ===
Head coach: Mai Đức Chung

No.	Pos.	Player	Date of birth (age)	Caps	Goals	Club
1	GK	Lại Thị Tuyết	27 April 1993 (age 33)	2	0	(Vietnam Football Federation) Phong Phú Hà Nam
14	GK	Trần Thị Kim Thanh	18 September 1993 (age 32)	34	0	(Vietnam Football Federation) Hồ Chí Minh City
20	GK	Khổng Thị Hằng	10 October 1993 (age 32)	22	0	(Vietnam Football Federation) Than Khoáng Sản
2	DF	Lương Thị Thu Thương	1 May 2000 (age 26)	9	0	(Vietnam Football Federation) Than Khoáng Sản
3	DF	Chương Thị Kiều	19 August 1995 (age 30)	37	4	(Vietnam Football Federation) Hồ Chí Minh City
4	DF	Trần Thị Thu	15 January 1991 (age 35)	17	1	(Vietnam Football Federation) Hồ Chí Minh City
5	DF	Hoàng Thị Loan	6 February 1995 (age 31)	26	2	(Vietnam Football Federation) Hà Nội
13	DF	Lê Thị Diễm My	6 March 1994 (age 32)	2	0	(Vietnam Football Federation) Than Khoáng Sản
6	MF	Phạm Hoàng Quỳnh	20 December 1992 (age 33)	30	6	(Vietnam Football Federation) Phong Phú Hà Nam
7	MF	Nguyễn Thị Tuyết Dung (Vice-captain)	13 December 1993 (age 32)	58	45	(Vietnam Football Federation) Phong Phú Hà Nam
8	MF	Trần Thị Thùy Trang	8 August 1988 (age 37)	38	4	(Vietnam Football Federation) Hồ Chí Minh City
15	MF	Nguyễn Thị Bích Thùy	1 May 1994 (age 32)	35	11	(Vietnam Football Federation) Hồ Chí Minh City
16	MF	Dương Thị Vân	20 December 1994 (age 31)	55	13	(Vietnam Football Federation) Than Khoáng Sản
17	MF	Trần Thị Phương Thảo	15 January 1993 (age 33)	41	11	(Vietnam Football Federation) Hồ Chí Minh City
18	MF	Nguyễn Thị Vạn	10 January 1997 (age 29)	32	11	(Vietnam Football Federation) Than Khoáng Sản
9	FW	Huỳnh Như (Captain)	28 November 1991 (age 34)	57	50	(Vietnam Football Federation) Hồ Chí Minh City
10	FW	Nguyễn Thị Tuyết Ngân	10 February 2000 (age 26)	7	1	(Vietnam Football Federation) Hồ Chí Minh City
11	FW	Ngân Thị Vạn Sự	29 April 2001 (age 25)	8	1	(Vietnam Football Federation) Hà Nội
12	FW	Phạm Hải Yến	9 November 1994 (age 31)	52	31	(Vietnam Football Federation) Hà Nội
19	FW	Nguyễn Thị Thanh Nhã	25 September 2001 (age 24)	11	2	(Vietnam Football Federation) Hà Nội

=== Philippines ===
Head coach: (Australia) Alen Stajcic

No.	Pos.	Player	Date of birth (age)	Club
1	GK	Inna Palacios	February 8, 1994 (age 32)	(Philippine Football Federation) Kaya–Iloilo
2	DF	Malea Cesar	December 9, 2003 (age 22)	(United States Soccer Federation) Sunset Apollos
3	DF	Dominique Randle	December 10, 1994 (age 31)	Unattached
4	MF	Jaclyn Sawicki	November 14, 1992 (age 33)	Unattached
5	DF	Hali Long	January 21, 1995 (age 31)	(Philippine Football Federation) Kaya–Iloilo
6	MF	Tahnai Annis (captain)	June 20, 1989 (age 37)	Unattached
7	MF	Camille Rodriguez	December 27, 1994 (age 31)	(Philippine Football Federation) Kaya–Iloilo
8	FW	Sarina Bolden	June 30, 1996 (age 30)	(Japan Football Association) Chifure AS Elfen
9	MF	Jessica Miclat	October 8, 1998 (age 27)	(Cyprus Football Association) Aris Limassol
10	MF	Ryley Bugay	January 23, 1996 (age 30)	Unattached
11	MF	Anicka Castañeda	December 16, 1999 (age 26)	(Philippine Football Federation) DLSU Lady Booters
12	MF	Kaya Hawkinson	April 17, 2000 (age 26)	(United States Soccer Federation) Cal State Fullerton
13	DF	Chantelle Maniti	January 3, 2005 (age 21)	(Football Australia) Football NSW Institute
14	FW	Isabella Flanigan	February 22, 2005 (age 21)	(United States Soccer Federation) Montverde Eagles
15	MF	Carleigh Frilles	April 11, 2002 (age 24)	(United States Soccer Federation) Coastal Carolina Chanticleers
16	DF	Sofia Harrison	February 16, 1999 (age 27)	Unattached
17	FW	Alisha del Campo	September 20, 1999 (age 26)	(Philippine Football Federation) DLSU Lady Booters
18	GK	Olivia McDaniel	October 14, 1997 (age 28)	Unattached
19	DF	Eva Madarang	September 13, 1997 (age 28)	(Royal Spanish Football Federation) CD Pozoalbense
20	FW	Quinley Quezada	April 7, 1997 (age 29)	(Japan Football Association) JEF United Chiba Ladies

=== Cambodia ===
Head coach: Prak Vuthy

== Group B ==
=== Thailand ===
Head coach: (Japan) Miyo Okamoto

No.	Pos.	Player	Date of birth (age)	Caps	Goals	Club
1	GK	Waraporn Boonsing	16 February 1990 (aged 31)	155	0	(Football Association of Thailand) BG Bundit Asia
2	DF	Kanjanaporn Saenkhun	18 July 1996 (aged 25)	24	0	(Football Association of Thailand) BG Bundit Asia
3	FW	Irravadee Makris	20 January 1992 (aged 30)	5	4	(Football Association of Thailand) MH Nakhon Si Lady
4	DF	Phornphirun Philawan	8 April 1999 (aged 22)	10	0	(Japan Football Association) MyNavi Sendai
5	DF	Amornrat Utchai	4 September 1994 (aged 27)	1	0	(Football Association of Thailand) BG Bundit Asia
6	MF	Pikul Khueanpet	20 September 1988 (aged 33)	115	2	(Football Association of Thailand) BG Bundit Asia
7	MF	Silawan Intamee (captain)	22 January 1994 (aged 27)	85	15	(Football Association of Thailand) Chonburi FC
8	MF	Nipawan Panyosuk	15 March 1995 (aged 26)	20	2	(Football Association of Thailand) Chonburi FC
9	DF	Warunee Phetwiset	13 December 1990 (aged 31)	100	0	(Football Association of Thailand) MH Nakhon Si Lady
10	DF	Sunisa Srangthaisong	6 May 1988 (aged 33)	152	15	(Football Association of Thailand) BG Bundit Asia
11	FW	Jaruwan Chaiyarak	23 April 1990 (aged 31)	10	3	(Football Association of Thailand) Chonburi FC
12	MF	Nutwadee Pram-nak	9 October 2000 (aged 21)	12	2	(Football Association of Thailand) Bangkok
13	FW	Kanyanat Chetthabutr	24 September 1999 (aged 22)	17	7	(Football Association of Thailand) BG Bundit Asia
14	FW	Saowalak Pengngam	30 November 1996 (aged 25)	20	10	(Football Association of Thailand) Chonburi FC
15	MF	Orapin Waenngoen	7 October 1995 (aged 26)	22	6	(Football Association of Thailand) BG Bundit Asia
16	DF	Uraiporn Yongkul	17 August 1998 (aged 23)	1	0	(Football Association of Thailand) BG Bundit Asia
17	FW	Taneekarn Dangda	15 December 1992 (aged 29)	71	19	(Football Association of Thailand) MH Nakhon Si Lady
18	GK	Chotmanee Thongmongkol	12 January 1999 (aged 23)	1	0	(Football Association of Thailand) Chonburi FC
19	FW	Pitsamai Sornsai	19 January 1989 (aged 33)	120	11	(Chinese Taipei Football Association) Taichung Blue Whale
20	MF	Wilaiporn Boothduang	25 June 1987 (aged 34)	98	28	(Football Association of Thailand) Royal Thai Air Force
21	DF	Chatchawan Rodthong	22 June 2002 (aged 19)	2	0	(Football Association of Thailand) Bangkok
22	GK	Tiffany Sornpao	22 May 1998 (aged 23)	4	0	(Football Association of Iceland) Keflavík
23	FW	Suchawadee Nildhamrong	1 April 1997 (aged 24)	20	15	(Swedish Football Association) Kristianstads

=== Myanmar ===
Head coach: Tin Myint Aung

No.	Pos.	Player	Date of birth (age)	Caps	Goals	Club
1	GK	May Zin Nwe	7 March 1995 (aged 26)	12	0	(Myanmar Football Federation) Myawady
18	GK	Zu Latt Nadi	22 December 2000 (aged 21)	0	0	(Myanmar Football Federation) Myawady
23	GK	Khine Zar Win	26 June 1999 (aged 22)	0	0	(Myanmar Football Federation) ISPE
2	DF	Aye Aye Moe	4 February 1995 (aged 26)	25	0	(Myanmar Football Federation) Myawady
3	DF	Chit Chit	18 October 1996 (aged 25)	15	1	(Myanmar Football Federation) Myawady
4	DF	Khin Myo Win	10 February 1999 (aged 22)	1	0	(Myanmar Football Federation) ISPE
5	DF	Phyu Phyu Win	1 December 2004 (aged 17)	6	0	(Myanmar Football Federation) Myawady
12	DF	Nant Zu Zu Htet	26 September 2000 (aged 21)	0	0	(Myanmar Football Federation) Myawady
15	DF	Zune Yu Ya Oo	12 February 2001 (aged 20)	2	0	(Myanmar Football Federation) Myawady
21	DF	Khin Than Wai	2 November 1995 (aged 26)	65	3	(Myanmar Football Federation) Myawady
22	DF	Ei Ei Kyaw	1 April 2002 (aged 19)	0	0	(Myanmar Football Federation) ISPE
6	MF	Thine Thine Yu	27 September 1995 (aged 26)	26	0	(Myanmar Football Federation) ISPE
8	MF	San Thaw Thaw	2 January 2001 (aged 21)	7	3	(Myanmar Football Federation) Myawady
9	MF	Khin Mo Mo Tun	3 June 1999 (aged 22)	35	3	(Myanmar Football Federation) Thitsar Arman
10	MF	Khin Marlar Tun (captain)	21 May 1988 (aged 33)	8	4	(Myanmar Football Federation) ISPE
13	MF	Hnin Pwint Aye	26 January 2004 (aged 17)	0	0	(Myanmar Football Federation) ISPE
14	MF	Win Win	12 February 2003 (aged 18)	0	0	(Myanmar Football Federation) YREO
16	MF	Naw Htet Htet Wai	30 July 2000 (aged 21)	1	0	(Myanmar Football Federation) Myawady
20	MF	Nu Nu	1 April 1999 (aged 22)	25	5	(Myanmar Football Federation) ISPE
7	FW	Win Theingi Tun	1 February 1995 (aged 26)	60	56	(All India Football Federation) Lords FA
11	FW	Khin Moe Wai	16 December 1989 (aged 32)	63	33	(Myanmar Football Federation) Thitsar Arman
17	FW	Myat Noe Khin	24 July 2003 (aged 18)	6	2	(Myanmar Football Federation) YREO
19	FW	July Kyaw	21 July 1999 (aged 22)	30	10	(Myanmar Football Federation) Thitsar Arman

=== Laos ===
Head coach: Vongmisay Soubouakham

=== Singapore ===
Head coach: Stephen Ng

No.	Pos.	Player	Date of birth (age)	Caps	Goals	Club
1	GK	Noor Kusumawati	29 September 1990 (age 35)	37		(Football Association of Singapore) Lion City Sailors
22	GK	Beatrice Tan	29 June 1992 (age 34)	5		(Football Association of Singapore) Lion City Sailors
2	DF	Nur Syazwani Ruzi	20 December 2001 (age 24)	11	0	(Football Association of Singapore) Lion City Sailors
3	DF	Nur Hidayu Nazri	16 March 2004 (age 22)	4		(Football Association of Singapore) Bussorah Youth Sports Club
4	DF	Stephanie Dominguez	27 September 1998 (age 27)	17	2	(Football Association of Singapore) Still Aerion FC
5	DF	Fatin Aqillah	11 June 1994 (age 32)	3		(Football Association of Singapore) Lion City Sailors
13	DF	Ernie Sulastri	24 November 1988 (age 37)	44		(Football Association of Singapore) Lion City Sailors
15	DF	Umairah Hamdan	11 March 2002 (age 24)	11	0	(Football Association of Singapore) Lion City Sailors
18	DF	Siti Rosnani	22 May 1997 (age 29)	28		(Japan Football Association) Kibi International University
19	DF	Dhaniyah Qasimah	7 July 2004 (age 22)	9		(Football Association of Singapore) Hougang United
6	MF	Nur Farhanah Ruhaizat	26 July 1998 (age 27)	20		(Football Association of Singapore) Still Aerion Women
7	MF	Mastura Jeilani	10 July 1992 (age 34)	11		(Football Association of Singapore) Balestier Khalsa
12	MF	Ho Hui Xin	23 April 1992 (age 34)	26		(Football Association of Singapore) Lion City Sailors\
14	MF	Khairunnisa Anwar	21 February 2003 (age 23)	2		(Football Association of Singapore) Lion City Sailors
20	MF	Dorcas Chu	29 July 2002 (age 23)	9	1	(Football Association of Singapore) Lion City Sailors
21	MF	Venetia Lim	14 October 2003 (age 22)	6		(Football Association of Singapore) Lion City Sailors
8	FW	Danelle Tan	25 October 2004 (age 21)	7	3	(The Football Association) Mill Hill School
9	FW	Nicole Lim	10 April 2002 (age 24)	0		(Scottish Football Association) University of Edinburgh
10	FW	Nur Izzati Rosni	24 May 1999 (age 27)	14		(Football Association of Singapore) Lion City Sailors
11	FW	Putri Syaliza Sazali	17 March 2003 (age 23)	8	0	(United States Soccer Federation) Eastern Florida State
