= 2026 V-Women's League =

V-Women's League
- Season: 2026
- Dates: 20 June – 23 October
- Champions: Ho Chi Minh City I 15th title 8th title in a row
- AFC Champions League: Ho Chi Minh City I
- Matches: 42
- Goals: 153 (3.64 per match)
- Top goalscorer: Nguyễn Thị Bích Thùy (11 goals)
- Best goalkeeper: Trần Thị Kim Thanh
- Biggest home win: Hồ Chí Minh City I 7–0 Hanoi II (29 July 2026); Phong Phu Ha Nam 7–0 Hanoi II (12 October 2026); Than KSVN 7–0 Hanoi II (18 October 2026)
- Biggest away win: Hanoi II 0–7 Phong Phu Ha Nam (9 July 2026)
- Highest scoring: Than KSVN 3–4 Thai Nguyen T&T (25 June 2026); Hanoi II 0–7 Phong Phu Ha Nam (9 July 2026); Hồ Chí Minh City I 7–0 Hanoi II (29 July 2026); Hồ Chí Minh City II 1–6 Than KSVN (12 October 2026); Phong Phu Ha Nam 7–0 Hanoi II (12 October 2026); Than KSVN 7–0 Hanoi II (18 October 2026)
- Longest winning run: 5 games Hồ Chí Minh City I
- Longest unbeaten run: 10 games Ho Chi Minh City I
- Longest winless run: 12 games Hanoi II; Hồ Chí Minh City II
- Longest losing run: 5 games Hanoi II

The 2026 V-Women's League (Vietnamese: Giải bóng đá nữ Vô địch quốc gia 2026), referred to as the 2026 Vietnamese Women's National League - Thái Sơn Bắc Cup for sponsorship purposes (Vietnamese: Giải Bóng đá nữ Vô địch quốc gia - Cúp Thái Sơn Bắc 2026) is the 29th season of the Vietnamese Women's National League since it was formed in 1998. The season began on 20 June and will end on 23 October.

This is the league's first ever season under the name V-Women's League, following the league rebranding in May 2026.

== Teams ==
7 teams enter the league this season, with the return of Hà Nội II absent from the previous season.

=== Stadiums and locations ===
For the first time in the league's history, the teams will play at their home stadiums instead of at a centralized venue.

Locations of the 2026 season teams

Team	Location	Stadium	Capacity	Previous season rank
Hà Nội I	Hanoi	Hà Đông	3,000	2nd
Hà Nội II	Hanoi	Hà Đông	3,000	Did not enter
Hồ Chí Minh City I	Ho Chi Minh City	Ngãi Giao	1,000	1st
Hồ Chí Minh City II	Ho Chi Minh City	Thành Long	4,000	6th
Phong Phú Hà Nam	Ninh Bình	Hà Nam	20,000	5th
Thái Nguyên T&T	Thái Nguyên	Thái Nguyên	22,000	3rd
Than KSVN	Quảng Ninh	Cửa Ông	4,000	4th

=== Personnel and kits ===
Team	Manager	Captain	Kit manufacturer	Shirt sponsor
Hanoi I	(Vietnam) Phùng Thị Minh Nguyệt	(Vietnam) Phạm Hải Yến	Made by club	LS Cable & System
Hanoi II	(Vietnam) Đào Thị Miện	(Vietnam) Đặng Thanh Thảo	Made by club	LS Cable & System
Ho Chi Minh City I	(Vietnam) Đoàn Thị Kim Chi	(Vietnam) Chương Thị Kiều	(Vietnam) Kamito	LS Cable & System
Ho Chi Minh City II	(Vietnam) Lưu Ngọc Mai	(Vietnam) Hoàng Thị Nương	(Vietnam) Vina Authentic	LS Cable & System
Phong Phu Ha Nam	(Vietnam) Nguyễn Thị Khánh Thu	(Vietnam) Trần Thị Duyên	(Thailand) Grand Sport	Mollis Hanoi
Thai Nguyen T&T	(Vietnam) Văn Thị Thanh	(Vietnam) Trần Thị Thu	(Japan) Jogarbola	T&T Group
Than KSVN	(Vietnam) Đoàn Minh Hải	(Vietnam) Lê Thị Diễm My	(Spain) Kelme	Vinacomin

== Foreign players ==
Teams are allowed to register up to three foreign players, with two of whom must having Vietnamese heritage.

Club	Player 1	Player 2 (Vietnamese ancestry)	Player 3 (Vietnamese ancestry)	Unregistred / Former players
Hanoi I				
Hanoi II				
Ho Chi Minh City I	(Brazil) Joelma Church			(Jamaica) Izzy Groves
Ho Chi Minh City II				
Phong Phu Ha Nam				
Thai Nguyen T&T				(New Zealand) Rebecca Lake
Than KSVN				

== League table ==
Pos	Team	Pld	W	D	L	GF	GA	GD	Pts	Qualification
1	Ho Chi Minh City I (C)	12	9	1	2	32	7	+25	28	Qualification for the Champions League group stage
2	Thai Nguyen T&T	12	8	3	1	29	12	+17	27	
3	Hanoi I	12	7	3	2	22	12	+10	24	
4	Phong Phu Ha Nam	12	6	3	3	33	13	+20	21	
5	Than KSVN	12	4	1	7	24	19	+5	13	
6	Ho Chi Minh City II	12	0	3	9	9	40	−31	3	
7	Hanoi II	12	0	2	10	4	50	−46	2	

Source: VFF
Rules for classification: 1) Points; 2) Head-to-head points; 3) Head-to-head goal difference; 4) Head-to-head goals scored; 5) Goal difference; 6) Goals scored; 7) Disciplinary points.
(C) Champions

== Matches ==
Home \ Away	HN1	HN2	HC1	HC2	PHN	TNT	TKS
Hanoi I	—	3–0	0–1	2–1	2–1	1–1	3–0
Hanoi II	1–5	—	0–2	1–1	0–7	0–2	0–3
Ho Chi Minh City I	3–0	7–0	—	6–0	0–2	1–2	1–0
Ho Chi Minh City II	1–2	2–2	0–5	—	0–4	0–3	1–6
Phong Phu Ha Nam	2–2	7–0	2–3	2–2	—	1–2	2–1
Thai Nguyen T&T	0–1	4–0	1–1	5–0	1–1	—	3–2
Than KSVN	1–1	7–0	0–2	2–1	0–2	3–4	—

Source: VFF
Legend: Blue = home team win; Yellow = draw; Red = away team win.

=== Positions by round ===
Team ╲ Round	1	2	3	4	5	6	7	8	9	10	11	12	13	14
Hanoi I	2	2	2	2	2	2	2	2	2	2	3	2	3	3
Hanoi II	6	6	6	6	7	7	7	7	7	7	7	7	7	7
Ho Chi Minh City I	1	1	1	1	1	1	1	1	1	1	1	1	1	1
Ho Chi Minh City II	7	7	5	5	6	6	6	6	6	6	6	6	6	6
Phong Phu Ha Nam	3	4	4	4	4	4	4	4	4	4	4	4	4	4
Thai Nguyen T&T	4	3	3	3	3	3	3	3	3	3	2	3	2	2
Than KSVN	5	5	7	7	5	5	5	5	5	5	5	5	5	5

Winner and qualification to AFC Women's Champions League
Last place in table

Source: VFF

== Awards ==
=== Annual awards ===
Award	Winner	Club
Player of the Season	(Vietnam) Trần Thị Thu Xuân	Ho Chi Minh City I
Top goalscorer	(Vietnam) Nguyễn Thị Bích Thùy	Thai Nguyen T&T
Goalkeeper of the Season	(Vietnam) Trần Thị Kim Thanh	Ho Chi Minh City I
Award	Club	
Rising Star award	Hanoi I	
