= 2024 AFC U-20 Women's Asian Cup squads =

The following is a list of squads for each national team competing at the 2024 AFC U-20 Women's Asian Cup. The tournament took place in Uzbekistan, between 3–16 March 2024. It was the 11th biennial international youth football championship organised by the Asian Football Confederation for the women's under-20 national teams of Asia.

Players born between 1 January 2004 and 31 December 2008 were eligible to compete in the tournament. Each team had to register a squad of minimum 18 players and maximum 23 players, minimum three of whom must be goalkeepers (regulation articles 21.2 and 26.3). The full squad listings are below. The final squads were registered officially on 2 March 2024.

The age listed for each player is their age as of 3 March 2024, the first day of the tournament. The numbers of caps and goals listed for each player do not include any matches played after the start of the tournament. The club listed is the club for which the player last played a competitive match prior to the tournament. The nationality for each club reflects the national association (not the league) to which the club is affiliated. A flag is included for coaches who are of a different nationality to their team.

== Group A ==
=== Australia ===
Coach: Leah Blayney

The final squad was announced on 14 February 2024.

No.	Pos.	Player	Date of birth (age)	Caps	Goals	Club
1	GK	Chloe Lincoln	4 January 2005 (aged 19)	9	0	(Football Australia) Canberra United
2	DF	Tijan McKenna	8 September 2004 (aged 19)	4	0	(Football Australia) Melbourne City
3	DF	Teagan Bertolissio	1 August 2006 (aged 17)	3	0	(Football Australia) Canberra United
4	DF	Gemma Ferris	27 December 2006 (aged 17)	6	1	(Football Australia) Western Sydney Wanderers
5	DF	Jessika Nash (captain)	5 October 2004 (aged 19)	11	0	(Football Australia) Melbourne Victory
6	MF	Shay Hollman	19 September 2005 (aged 18)	6	2	(Football Australia) Sydney FC
7	MF	Milly Boughton	3 February 2006 (aged 18)	1	0	(The Football Association) Tottenham Hotspur
8	MF	Alana Murphy	21 April 2005 (aged 18)	8	5	(Football Australia) Melbourne Victory
9	FW	Jynaya dos Santos	22 September 2005 (aged 18)	8	4	(Football Australia) Sydney FC
10	MF	Daniela Galic	17 June 2006 (aged 17)	14	5	(Football Australia) Melbourne City
11	FW	Kahli Johnson	18 February 2004 (aged 20)	13	6	(Football Australia) Western United
12	GK	Tahlia Franco	29 June 2006 (aged 17)	2	0	(Football Australia) Sydney FC
13	FW	Peta Trimis	26 August 2006 (aged 17)	3	0	(Football Australia) Central Coast Mariners
14	MF	Zara Kruger	29 May 2006 (aged 17)	6	0	(Football Australia) Sydney FC
15	DF	Alexia Apostolakis	16 May 2006 (aged 17)	9	1	(Football Australia) Western Sydney Wanderers
16	FW	Claudia Cicco	27 August 2004 (aged 19)	6	4	(Football Australia) Newcastle Jets
17	MF	Madeleine Caspers	15 March 2007 (aged 16)	0	0	(Football Australia) Sydney FC
18	GK	Grace Wilson	4 March 2005 (aged 18)	2	0	(Football Australia) Adelaide United
19	FW	Lara Gooch	2 November 2005 (aged 18)	1	0	(Football Australia) Newcastle Jets
20	MF	Indiana dos Santos	10 October 2007 (aged 16)	4	0	(Football Australia) Sydney FC
21	DF	Naomi Chinnama	13 May 2004 (aged 19)	13	0	(Football Australia) Melbourne City
22	MF	Georgia Cassidy	27 May 2005 (aged 18)	0	0	(Football Australia) Perth Glory
23	FW	Sasha Grove	30 December 2004 (aged 19)	7	2	(Football Australia) Canberra United

=== Chinese Taipei ===
Coach: Hsieh Chih-chun

A preliminary squad was announced on 7 February 2024. The final squad was announced on 28 February 2024.

No.	Pos.	Player	Date of birth (age)	Club
1	GK	Wang Ruo-ping	7 March 2006 (aged 17)	
2	FW	Kao Hsin	6 April 2007 (aged 16)	
3	DF	Ku Chien-yu	3 November 2005 (aged 18)	
4	FW	Lai Yu-chi	6 September 2004 (aged 19)	
5	DF	Lin Yu-hui	26 April 2006 (aged 17)	
6	DF	Pu Hsin-hui	12 September 2005 (aged 18)	
7	MF	Lin Jing-xuan	11 May 2005 (aged 18)	
8	MF	Lin I-tsen	31 December 2004 (aged 19)	
9	DF	Hsiao Ya-hsuan	16 January 2005 (aged 19)	
10	FW	Li Yi-wen	20 September 2005 (aged 18)	
11	FW	He Jia-shiuan	7 May 2005 (aged 18)	
12	FW	Chuan Tzu-yu	4 November 2008 (aged 15)	
13	MF	Chen Yu-chin	5 August 2007 (aged 16)	
14	FW	Yang Hsiao-chuan	23 September 2005 (aged 18)	
15	MF	Liu Yu-chiao	14 December 2005 (aged 18)	
16	FW	Ma Ho-ya	2 May 2007 (aged 16)	
17	MF	Sung Jui-hsuan	10 April 2005 (aged 18)	
18	GK	Liu Ying-chia	1 September 2005 (aged 18)	
19	DF	Jiang Yu-xuan	24 February 2005 (aged 19)	
20	DF	Li Chun-mei	3 August 2006 (aged 17)	
21	DF	Chang Meng-hsuan	7 November 2008 (aged 15)	
22	MF	Chou Chieh-ni	19 January 2004 (aged 20)	
23	GK	Chiu I-hsiu	22 July 2005 (aged 18)	

=== South Korea ===
Coach: Park Yoon-jung

The final squad was announced on 19 February 2024.

No.	Pos.	Player	Date of birth (age)	Club
1	GK	Park Hyun-jin	26 February 2004 (aged 20)	(Korea Football Association) Daedeok University
2	DF	Jeong Yu-jin	10 October 2005 (aged 18)	(Korea Football Association) Uiduk University
3	DF	Yang Da-min	18 September 2005 (aged 18)	(Korea Football Association) Ulsan National Institute of Science and Technology
4	DF	Eom Min-kyung	24 November 2004 (aged 19)	(Korea Football Association) Uiduk University
5	DF	Nam Seung-eun	10 January 2006 (aged 18)	(Korea Football Association) Osan Information High School
6	MF	Kim Shin-ji	3 May 2004 (aged 19)	(Korea Football Association) Uiduk University
7	FW	Jeon Yoo-kyung	20 January 2004 (aged 20)	(Korea Football Association) Uiduk University
8	MF	Kang Eun-young	5 December 2004 (aged 19)	(Korea Football Association) Daedeok University
9	FW	Park Soo-jeong	3 November 2004 (aged 19)	(Korea Football Association) Ulsan National Institute of Science and Technology
10	MF	Bae Ye-bin	7 December 2004 (aged 19)	(Korea Football Association) Uiduk University
11	FW	Hwang Da-young	21 December 2005 (aged 18)	(Korea Football Association) Sejong University
12	FW	Kim Su-ah	2 August 2004 (aged 19)	(Korea Football Association) Ulsan National Institute of Science and Technology
13	DF	Kim Kyu-yeon	23 June 2005 (aged 18)	(Korea Football Association) Ulsan National Institute of Science and Technology
14	FW	Cho Hye-young	18 February 2006 (aged 18)	(Korea Football Association) Gwangyang Girls' High School
15	MF	Ko Eun-bin	22 August 2005 (aged 18)	(Korea Football Association) Ulsan National Institute of Science and Technology
16	DF	Ko Da-ae	3 February 2005 (aged 19)	(Korea Football Association) Sejong University
17	MF	Hong Chae-bin	11 February 2004 (aged 20)	(Korea Football Association) Sejong University
18	MF	Won Chae-eun	16 June 2005 (aged 18)	(Korea Football Association) Sejong University
19	FW	Yang Eun-seo	16 December 2005 (aged 18)	(Korea Football Association) Sejong University
20	DF	Park Je-ah	29 October 2005 (aged 18)	(Japan Football Association) MyNavi Sendai
21	GK	Jeong Da-hee	13 November 2006 (aged 17)	(Korea Football Association) Chungnam Internet High School
22	MF	Kim Ji-hyeon	27 July 2004 (aged 19)	(Korea Football Association) Daedeok University
23	GK	Woo Seo-bin	13 April 2004 (aged 19)	(Korea Football Association) Uiduk University

=== Uzbekistan ===
Coach: Ilkham Khanjariev

No.	Pos.	Player	Date of birth (age)	Club
1	GK	Ezoza Sevinova	23 April 2007 (aged 16)	(Uzbekistan Football Association) Sevinch
2	FW	Shahnoza Dekanbaeva	18 January 2008 (aged 16)	Unattached
3	DF	Makhzuna Abdukarimova	19 January 2005 (aged 19)	(Uzbekistan Football Association) Pakhtakor
4	DF	Sevinch Rakhmatullaeva	16 March 2005 (aged 18)	(Uzbekistan Football Association) Lokomotiv Tashkent
5	DF	Zukhra Tursunalieva	7 April 2004 (aged 19)	(Uzbekistan Football Association) Pakhtakor
6	MF	Rukhshona Saydabbosova	30 January 2006 (aged 18)	(Uzbekistan Football Association) Sogdiana Jizzakh
7	FW	Alina Almatova	8 February 2005 (aged 19)	(Uzbekistan Football Association) Bunyodkor
8	MF	Rukhshona Olimjonova	28 November 2005 (aged 18)	(Uzbekistan Football Association) AGMK
9	FW	Zarina Mamatkarimova	4 March 2004 (aged 19)	(Uzbekistan Football Association) Sogdiana Jizzakh
10	DF	Leyla Oraniyazova	18 October 2004 (aged 19)	(Uzbekistan Football Association) AGMK
11	MF	Parvina Sodikova	28 August 2004 (aged 19)	(Uzbekistan Football Association) AGMK
12	GK	Fotima Bakhriddinova	5 September 2004 (aged 19)	(Uzbekistan Football Association) AGMK
13	MF	Umida Khatamova	15 June 2004 (aged 19)	(Uzbekistan Football Association) Lokomotiv Tashkent
14	FW	Leyla Rustullaeva	14 August 2006 (aged 17)	(Uzbekistan Football Association) AGMK
15	FW	Mehribon Egamberdieva	9 October 2007 (aged 16)	(Uzbekistan Football Association) Sevinch
16	FW	Dilnura Mamatkulova	16 October 2007 (aged 16)	(Uzbekistan Football Association) Sogdiana Jizzakh
17	DF	Sevinch Kuchkorova	28 September 2004 (aged 19)	(Uzbekistan Football Association) AGMK
18	DF	Aygerim Otenazarova	12 February 2004 (aged 20)	(Uzbekistan Football Association) AGMK
19	FW	Oydinoy Turgunova	15 March 2006 (aged 17)	(Uzbekistan Football Association) AGMK
20	FW	Zarina Norboeva	16 January 2006 (aged 18)	(Uzbekistan Football Association) Sevinch
21	GK	Charos Khayrullaeva	30 December 2007 (aged 16)	(Turkish Football Federation) Galatasaray
22	MF	Asalkhon Aminjonova	22 April 2007 (aged 16)	(Uzbekistan Football Association) AGMK
23	MF	Sevara Ruzieva	16 February 2004 (aged 20)	(Uzbekistan Football Association) Bunyodkor

== Group B ==
=== China ===
Coach: Wang Jun

A preliminary squad was announced on 7 February 2024.

No.	Pos.	Player	Date of birth (age)	Club
1	GK	Liu Chen	30 June 2006 (aged 17)	(Chinese Football Association) Shandong FC
2	DF	Zeng Yujia	7 July 2006 (aged 17)	(Chinese Football Association) Beijing FC
3	DF	Xia Lejiao	7 August 2004 (aged 19)	(Chinese Football Association) Guangdong FC
4	DF	Wang Siqian	8 June 2004 (aged 19)	(Chinese Football Association) Shanghai FC
5	DF	Zhao Xinyue	13 February 2004 (aged 20)	(Chinese Football Association) Shaanxi FC
6	MF	Zhang Yiqian	2 February 2006 (aged 18)	(Chinese Football Association) Qingdao FC
7	MF	Li Tingyingge	14 June 2004 (aged 19)	(Chinese Football Association) Shanghai FC
8	MF	Jiang Chenjing	23 January 2004 (aged 20)	(Chinese Football Association) Wuhan FFC
9	FW	Lu Jiayu	18 January 2006 (aged 18)	(Chinese Football Association) Shanghai FC
10	FW	Yu Jiaqi	4 April 2006 (aged 17)	(Chinese Football Association) Jiangsu FC
11	FW	Ouyang Yuhuan	21 March 2006 (aged 17)	(Chinese Football Association) Guangdong FC
12	GK	Pan Hongyan	30 December 2004 (aged 19)	(Chinese Football Association) Beijing FC
13	FW	Wu Yejia	11 January 2006 (aged 18)	(Chinese Football Association) Jiangsu FC
14	DF	Guo Nan	5 November 2004 (aged 19)	(Chinese Football Association) Changchun FC
15	MF	Yu Xingyue	24 December 2006 (aged 17)	(Chinese Football Association) Guangzhou FC
16	MF	Wang Aifang	15 January 2006 (aged 18)	(Chinese Football Association) Liaoning FC
17	MF	Huo Yuexin	8 March 2005 (aged 18)	(Chinese Football Association) Jiangsu FC
18	MF	Zhang Chenxi	23 March 2004 (aged 19)	(Chinese Football Association) Shanghai FC
19	DF	Liu Ling	11 July 2006 (aged 17)	(Chinese Football Association) Jiangsu FC
20	FW	Wang Zhen	22 November 2004 (aged 19)	(Chinese Football Association) Hebei FC
21	MF	Chen Jiayu	7 February 2004 (aged 20)	(Chinese Football Association) Jiangsu FC
22	GK	Guo Xinyu	14 March 2006 (aged 17)	(Chinese Football Association) Jiangsu FC
23	DF	Huang Xueyang	15 November 2004 (aged 19)	(Chinese Football Association) Shanghai FC

=== Japan ===
Coach: Michihisa Kano

A preliminary squad was announced on 25 January 2024. The final squad was announced on 13 February 2024.

No.	Pos.	Player	Date of birth (age)	Club
1	GK	Akane Okuma	15 September 2004 (aged 19)	(Japan Football Association) JEF United Chiba
2	DF	Kokoro Yoshioka	7 July 2005 (aged 18)	(Japan Football Association) MyNavi Sendai
3	DF	Hiromi Yoneda	2 October 2004 (aged 19)	(Japan Football Association) Cerezo Osaka
4	MF	Yurie Shirasawa	9 April 2004 (aged 19)	(Japan Football Association) Albirex Niigata
5	MF	Aemu Oyama	19 August 2004 (aged 19)	(Japan Football Association) Waseda University
6	DF	Rio Sasaki	17 September 2004 (aged 19)	(Japan Football Association) MyNavi Sendai
7	DF	Shinomi Koyama	31 January 2005 (aged 19)	(Swedish Football Association) Djurgården
8	MF	Fuka Tsunoda	24 October 2004 (aged 19)	(Japan Football Association) Urawa Red Diamonds
9	FW	Chinari Sasai	12 October 2004 (aged 19)	(Japan Football Association) Nojima Stella
10	MF	Manaka Matsukubo	28 July 2004 (aged 19)	(United States Soccer Federation) North Carolina Courage
11	FW	Haruna Oshima	29 March 2005 (aged 18)	(Japan Football Association) Omiya Ardija Ventus
12	DF	Rina Nakatani	27 April 2005 (aged 18)	(Japan Football Association) Cerezo Osaka
13	FW	Ai Tsujisawa	17 December 2005 (aged 18)	(Japan Football Association) INAC Kobe Leonessa
14	FW	Maya Hijikata	13 April 2004 (aged 19)	(Japan Football Association) Tokyo Verdy Beleza
15	MF	Manaka Hayashi	16 August 2004 (aged 19)	(United States Soccer Federation) Santa Clara Broncos
16	MF	Suzu Amano	18 February 2004 (aged 20)	(Japan Football Association) INAC Kobe Leonessa
17	DF	Uno Shiragaki	11 October 2005 (aged 18)	(Japan Football Association) Cerezo Osaka
18	GK	Akari Kashima	7 July 2005 (aged 18)	(Japan Football Association) Chifure AS Elfen Saitama
19	MF	Miyu Matsunaga	8 June 2006 (aged 17)	(Japan Football Association) Tokyo Verdy Beleza
20	FW	Moka Hiwatari	9 October 2005 (aged 18)	(Japan Football Association) Tokyo Verdy Beleza
21	GK	Uruha Iwasaki	13 March 2006 (aged 17)	(Japan Football Association) Nojima Stella
22	DF	Raika Okamura	30 July 2005 (aged 18)	(Japan Football Association) Urawa Red Diamonds
23	FW	Mao Kubota	30 May 2005 (aged 18)	(Japan Football Association) INAC Kobe Leonessa

=== North Korea ===
Coach: Ri Song-ho

No.	Pos.	Player	Date of birth (age)	Club
1	GK	Hyon Son-gyong	23 January 2004 (aged 20)	(DPR Korea Football Association) Naekohyang Sport Club
2	DF	Ri Su-yang	15 April 2004 (aged 19)	(DPR Korea Football Association) April 25 Sports Club
3	DF	Han Hong-ryon	10 January 2004 (aged 20)	(DPR Korea Football Association) Wolmido Sports Club
4	FW	Hyon Ji-hyang	28 June 2004 (aged 19)	(DPR Korea Football Association) Pyongyang Sports Club
5	DF	Oh Sol-song	30 June 2004 (aged 19)	(DPR Korea Football Association) Sobaeksu Sports Club
6	DF	Kim Kang-mi	1 November 2004 (aged 19)	(DPR Korea Football Association) Aprokgang Sports Club
7	FW	Jong Kum	1 June 2004 (aged 19)	(DPR Korea Football Association) Naekohyang Sport Club
8	MF	Kim Yu-gyong	5 February 2004 (aged 20)	(DPR Korea Football Association) April 25 Sports Club
9	MF	Kim Song-gyong	12 February 2005 (aged 19)	(DPR Korea Football Association) Aprokgang Sports Club
10	FW	Pak Mi-ryong	27 January 2004 (aged 20)	(DPR Korea Football Association) Naekohyang Sport Club
11	DF	Ham Ju-hyang	25 April 2004 (aged 19)	(DPR Korea Football Association) April 25 Sports Club
12	MF	Choe Kang-ryon	2 January 2004 (aged 20)	(DPR Korea Football Association) April 25 Sports Club
13	DF	Jon Ryong-jong	25 July 2004 (aged 19)	(DPR Korea Football Association) April 25 Sports Club
14	DF	Hwang Yu-yong	13 April 2006 (aged 17)	(DPR Korea Football Association) Aprokgang Sports Club
15	FW	Choe Il-son	1 January 2007 (aged 17)	(DPR Korea Football Association) April 25 Sports Club
16	DF	Pak Hyo-son	5 April 2004 (aged 19)	(DPR Korea Football Association) Naekohyang Sport Club
17	FW	Jang Kyong-hui	20 April 2004 (aged 19)	(DPR Korea Football Association) April 25 Sports Club
18	GK	Kim Kyong-rim	21 October 2004 (aged 19)	(DPR Korea Football Association) Naekohyang Sport Club
19	MF	Min Kyong-jin	23 January 2005 (aged 19)	(DPR Korea Football Association) Naekohyang Sport Club
20	MF	Chae Un-yong	12 April 2004 (aged 19)	(DPR Korea Football Association) Wolmido Sports Club
21	GK	Chae Un-gyong	29 November 2004 (aged 19)	(DPR Korea Football Association) Pyongyang Sports Club
22	MF	Kim Song-ok	11 December 2004 (aged 19)	(DPR Korea Football Association) Naekohyang Sport Club

=== Vietnam ===
Coach: (Japan) Akira Ijiri

A preliminary squad was announced on 29 January 2024. The squad was reduced to 25 players on 20 February 2024. The final squad was announced on 3 March 2024.

No.	Pos.	Player	Date of birth (age)	Club
1	GK	Danh Thị Kiều My	11 January 2004 (aged 20)	(Vietnam Football Federation) Hồ Chí Minh City
2	DF	Lê Thị Bảo Trâm	2 March 2004 (aged 20)	(Vietnam Football Federation) Than Khoáng Sản
3	DF	Nguyễn Thị Như Quỳnh	28 March 2004 (aged 19)	(Vietnam Football Federation) Than Khoáng Sản
4	DF	Hồ Thị Thanh Thảo	17 May 2004 (aged 19)	(Vietnam Football Federation) Than Khoáng Sản
5	MF	Hoàng Thị Ngọc Ánh	12 March 2005 (aged 18)	(Vietnam Football Federation) Thái Nguyên T&T
6	MF	Vũ Thị Hoa	16 November 2005 (aged 18)	(Vietnam Football Federation) Phong Phú Hà Nam
7	MF	Trần Nhật Lan	1 January 2004 (aged 20)	(Vietnam Football Federation) Than Khoáng Sản
8	DF	Nguyễn Thị Thùy Nhi	20 February 2006 (aged 18)	(Vietnam Football Federation) Hà Nội
9	FW	Lưu Hoàng Vân	9 April 2006 (aged 17)	(Vietnam Football Federation) Phong Phú Hà Nam
10	FW	Ngọc Minh Chuyên	23 June 2004 (aged 19)	(Vietnam Football Federation) Thái Nguyên T&T
11	MF	Nguyễn Thị Thùy Linh	29 June 2006 (aged 17)	(Vietnam Football Federation) Hồ Chí Minh City
12	GK	Nguyễn Phương Thảo	24 June 2004 (aged 19)	(Vietnam Football Federation) Phong Phú Hà Nam
13	MF	Lý Linh Trang	9 December 2005 (aged 18)	(Vietnam Football Federation) Hà Nội
14	MF	Nguyễn Thùy Linh	15 January 2004 (aged 20)	(Vietnam Football Federation) Phong Phú Hà Nam
15	MF	Bùi Thị Thương	1 July 2004 (aged 19)	(Vietnam Football Federation) Hà Nội
16	DF	Lưu Như Quỳnh	9 August 2004 (aged 19)	(Vietnam Football Federation) Thái Nguyên T&T
17	DF	Nguyễn Thị Mai Hương	15 April 2005 (aged 18)	(Vietnam Football Federation) Than Khoáng Sản
18	MF	Nguyễn Phương Anh	6 December 2005 (aged 18)	(Vietnam Football Federation) Phong Phú Hà Nam
19	MF	Trương Cẩm Ly	7 October 2005 (aged 18)	(Vietnam Football Federation) Phong Phú Hà Nam
20	DF	Lê Hồng Yêu	24 July 2007 (aged 16)	(Vietnam Football Federation) Phong Phú Hà Nam
21	GK	Lê Thị Thu	1 August 2007 (aged 16)	(Vietnam Football Federation) Phong Phú Hà Nam
22	FW	Ngân Thị Thanh Hiếu	13 February 2007 (aged 17)	(Vietnam Football Federation) Phong Phú Hà Nam
23	FW	Lê Thị Trang	21 December 2007 (aged 16)	(Vietnam Football Federation) Hà Nội
