= 1998 Vietnamese Women's National League =

First women's football season in Vietnam

Vietnamese Women's National League
- Season: 1998
- Dates: 2–10 October
- Champions: Hà Nội; 1st title
- Matches: 12
- Goals: 53 (4.42 per match)
- Top goalscorer: Bùi Thị Hiền Lương (8 goals)
- Best goalkeeper: Đỗ Thu Trang
- Biggest win: Hà Nội 8–0 Tiền Giang (4 October 1998)
- Highest scoring: Hà Nội 8–0 Tiền Giang (4 October 1998)
- Longest winning run: 4 games Hanoi
- Longest unbeaten run: 4 games Hanoi
- Longest winless run: 2 games Quận Ba Đình; Quảng Nam; Tiền Giang
- Longest losing run: 2 games Quận Ba Đình; Quảng Nam; Tiền Giang

The 1998 Vietnamese Women's National League (Vietnamese: Giải bóng đá nữ vô địch quốc gia 1998) was the inaugural season of the Vietnamese Women's National League. The season began from 2 October and ended in 10 October. Hà Nội won their first ever league title.

== Summary ==
On 1932, the first ever women's football club in Vietnam (previously French Indochina) was established, named Cái Vồn. Later, they played their first ever friendly match in Mỹ Thuận village. Later in 1933, a second women's football club in Vietnam was established named Xóm Chài.

At 2 July 1933, the first women's football match in Vietnam was played between Cái Vồn and Xóm Chài at Cochinchina (Southern Vietnam now).

Since 20th century, many women's football club were established and then later became professional. In 1998, the Women's National League in Vietnam was established.

== Teams ==
A total of 7 teams competed in the inaugural league.

Team	Location	Region
Hà Nội	Hanoi	Northern
TP. Hồ Chí Minh	Ho Chi Minh City	Southern
Than Việt Nam	Quảng Ninh	Northern
Hà Tây	Hà Tây	Northern
Quận Ba Đình	Hanoi	Northern
Tiền Giang	Tiền Giang	Southern
Quảng Nam	Quảng Nam	Central

=== Stadiums ===
The league plays in 2 centralized venues, one in Hanoi and one in Hà Tây

== Group stage ==
7 teams were played in the group stage, only the top 2 teams will qualify for the quarter-finals.

All times are local, (UTC+7)

Tiebreakers

The teams are ranked according to points (3 points for a win, 1 point for a draw, 0 points for a loss). If tied on points, tiebreakers will be applied in the following order:

1. Goal difference in all group matches;
2. Goals scored in all group matches;
3. Penalty shoot-out if only two teams are tied and they meet in the last round of the group;
4. Drawing of lots.

=== Group A ===
Pos	Team	Pld	W	D	L	GF	GA	GD	Pts	Qualification
1	Hà Nội	3	3	0	0	16	2	+14	9	Advance to knockout stage
2	Than Việt Nam	3	1	0	2	9	4	+5	3	Advance to knockout stage
3	Tiền Giang	3	1	0	2	2	10	−8	3	
4	Quảng Nam	3	1	0	2	2	13	−11	3	

Source: FPT Sport news
Rules for classification: Tiebreakers
2 October 1998
14:00

Than Việt Nam	2–3	Hà Nội

Hanoi Stadium, Hanoi
2 October 1998
15:15

Quảng Nam	2–1	Tiền Giang

Hanoi Stadium, Hanoi

4 October 1998
14:00

Than Việt Nam	7–0	Quảng Nam
	Report

Hanoi Stadium, Hanoi
4 October 1998
15:15

Hà Nội	8–0	Tiền Giang
	Report

Hanoi Stadium, Hanoi

6 October 1998
14:00

Hà Nội	5–0	Quảng Nam

Hanoi Stadium, Hanoi
6 October 1998
15:15

Tiền Giang	1–0	Than Việt Nam

Hanoi Stadium, Hanoi

=== Group B ===
Pos	Team	Pld	W	D	L	GF	GA	GD	Pts	Qualification
1	TP. Hồ Chí Minh	2	2	0	0	4	1	+3	6	Advance to knockout stage
2	Hà Tây	2	1	0	1	5	3	+2	3	Advance to knockout stage
3	Quận Ba Đình	2	0	0	2	1	6	−5	0	

Source: FPT Sport news
Rules for classification: Tiebreakers
2 October 1998
15:15

TP. Hồ Chí Minh	2–0	Quận Ba Đình

Hà Tây Stadium, Hà Tây

4 October 1998
15:15

Hà Tây	1–2	TP. Hồ Chí Minh
	Report

Hà Tây Stadium, Hà Tây

6 October 1998
15:15

Quận Ba Dinh	1–4	Hà Tây

Hà Tây Stadium, Hà Tây

== Knockout stage ==
All times are local, (UTC+7)

=== Bracket ===
Semi-finals
8 October – Hanoi
Hà Nội	6
Hà Tây	0
8 October – Hanoi
TP. Hồ Chí Minh	3
Than Việt Nam	2

Final
10 October – Hanoi
Hà Nội	3
TP. Hồ Chí Minh	0

=== Semi-finals ===
8 October 1998
14:00

TP. Hồ Chí Minh	3–2	Than Việt Nam

Hanoi Stadium, Hanoi
8 October 1998
15:15

Hà Nội	6–0	Hà Tây

Hanoi Stadium, Hanoi

=== Final ===
10 October 1998
15:00

Hà Nội	3–0	TP. Hồ Chí Minh
Nguyễn Thị Hà 11'; Bùi Thị Hiền Lương 16', 41'	Report

Hanoi Stadium, Hanoi

Vietnamese Women's National League
1998 Winners
Hà Nội
1st title

== Awards ==
The following awards were given after the league:

Best player	Best goalkeeper
Bùi Thị Hiền Lương (Hanoi)	Đỗ Thu Trang (Hà Tây)
Top goalscorers
Bùi Thị Hiền Lương (Hanoi)
8 goals
