= Nguyễn Thanh Huyền =

Vietnamese footballer

Personal information
- Date of birth: 12 August 1996 (age 30)
- Place of birth: Cầu Giấy, Hanoi, Vietnam
- Height: 1.63 m (5 ft 4 in)
- Position: Defender

Team information
- Current team: Hà Nội I
- Number: 3

Senior career*
Years	Team	Apps	(Gls)
2012–2014	Hà Nội II	32	(6)
2015–	Hà Nội I	51	(7)

International career^{‡}
2014–2016	Vietnam U20	5	(0)
2016–	Vietnam	18	(3)
- * Club domestic league appearances and goals ‡ National team caps and goals as of 11 March 2020

Nguyễn Thanh Huyền (born 12 August 1996) is a Vietnamese footballer who plays as a defender for Women's Championship club Hà Nội I and the Vietnam women's national team.
