= Bùi Thị Thúy =

Vietnamese footballer

Personal information
- Date of birth: 17 July 1998 (age 28)
- Place of birth: Đông Hưng, Thái Bình, Vietnam
- Height: 1.55 m (5 ft 1 in)
- Position: Defender

Team information
- Current team: Than Khoáng Sản
- Number: 22

Senior career*
Years	Team	Apps	(Gls)
2016–	Than Khoáng Sản	22	(0)

International career^{‡}
2018–	Vietnam	3	(0)
- * Club domestic league appearances and goals ‡ National team caps and goals as of 24 August 2018

Bùi Thị Thúy (born 17 July 1998) is a Vietnamese footballer who plays as a defender for Women's Championship club Than Khoáng Sản. She has been a member of the Vietnam women's national team.
