= Đinh Thị Thùy Dung =

Vietnamese footballer

Personal information
- Date of birth: 25 August 1998 (age 28)
- Place of birth: Tân Yên, Bắc Giang, Vietnam
- Height: 1.56 m (5 ft 1 in)
- Position: Midfielder

Team information
- Current team: Than Khoáng Sản
- Number: 17

Senior career*
Years	Team	Apps	(Gls)
2016–	Than Khoáng Sản	32	(2)

International career^{‡}
2017–	Vietnam	5	(0)
- * Club domestic league appearances and goals ‡ National team caps and goals as of 11 March 2020

Đinh Thị Thùy Dung (born 25 August 1998) is a Vietnamese footballer who plays as a midfielder for Women's Championship club Than Khoáng Sản and the Vietnam women's national team.
