= Đào Thị Kiều Oanh =

Vietnamese footballer

Personal information
- Date of birth: 25 January 2003 (age 23)
- Place of birth: Thanh Oai, Hanoi, Vietnam
- Height: 1.70 m (5 ft 7 in)
- Position: Goalkeeper

Team information
- Current team: Hà Nội I
- Number: 33

Senior career*
Years	Team	Apps	(Gls)
2021–	Hà Nội I	13	(0)

International career^{‡}
2023–	Vietnam	0	(0)
- * Club domestic league appearances and goals ‡ National team caps and goals as of 10 July 2023

Đào Thị Kiều Oanh (born 25 January 2003) is a Vietnamese footballer who plays as a goalkeeper for Women's Championship club Hà Nội I and the Vietnam women's national team.
