= Hà Tây =

Coordinates: 20°52′52″N 106°24′30″E

- Commune
- Interactive map of Hà Tây
- Country: Vietnam
- Region: Red River Delta
- Municipality: Hai Phong
- Established: 16 June 2025

Area
  - Total: 24.41 km^{2} (9.42 sq mi)

Population (31 December 2024)
  - Total: 34,187
  - Density: 1,400/km^{2} (3,600/sq mi)

Hà Tây is a commune in the municipality of Hai Phong, Vietnam.

The area of present-day Hà Tây Commune was formerly located in Thanh Hà district, Hải Dương province.

On 12 June 2025, the National Assembly of Vietnam adopted Resolution No. 202/2025/QH15 on the reorganization of provincial-level administrative units, effective on the same date. Under the resolution, Hải Dương province was merged into Hai Phong, and the area where Hà Tây Commune was subsequently established became part of the municipality.

On 16 June 2025, the Standing Committee of the National Assembly of Vietnam issued a resolution on the arrangement of commune-level administrative units in Hai Phong in 2025. Under the resolution, the entire area and population of Tân An and An Phượng communes, together with part of the area and population of Thanh Hải Commune, were merged to form a new commune named Hà Tây.
