= Khổng Thị Hằng =

Vietnamese footballer

Personal information
- Date of birth: 10 October 1993 (age 33)
- Place of birth: Vĩnh Yên, Vĩnh Phúc, Vietnam
- Height: 1.69 m (5 ft 7 in)
- Position: Goalkeeper

Team information
- Current team: Thái Nguyên T&T
- Number: 32

Senior career*
Years	Team	Apps	(Gls)
2011–2026	Than KSVN	83	(0)
2026–	Thái Nguyên T&T		

International career^{‡}
2013–	Vietnam	32	(0)
- * Club domestic league appearances and goals ‡ National team caps and goals as of 11 March 2020

Khổng Thị Hằng (born 10 October 1993) is a Vietnamese footballer who plays as a goalkeeper for Women's National League club Thái Nguyên T&T and the Vietnam women's national team.

== Club career ==
After 15 years playing for Than KSVN, Hằng signed for Thái Nguyên T&T in 2026.
