= Nguyễn Thị Vạn =

Vietnamese footballer

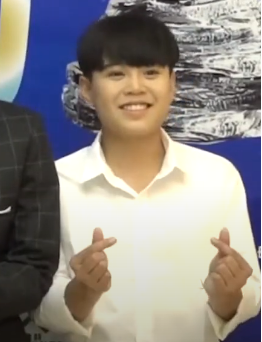
- Vạn in 2022

Personal information
- Date of birth: 10 January 1997 (age 29)
- Place of birth: Tam Kỳ, Quảng Nam, Vietnam
- Height: 1.53 m (5 ft 0 in)
- Position: Midfielder

Team information
- Current team: Thái Nguyên T&T
- Number: 18

Senior career*
Years	Team	Apps	(Gls)
2015–2026	Than KSVN	43	(5)
2026–	Thái Nguyên T&T		

International career^{‡}
2016–	Vietnam	41	(13)
- * Club domestic league appearances and goals ‡ National team caps and goals as of 29 September 2021

Nguyễn Thị Vạn (born 10 January 1997) is a Vietnamese footballer who plays as a midfielder for Women's National League club Thái Nguyên T&T and the Vietnam women's national team.

== Career ==
Vạn joined Thái Nguyên T&T in 2026.

== International goals ==
.Scores and results are list Vietnam's goal tally first.

No.	Date	Venue	Opponent	Score	Result	Competition
1.	3 July 2018	Bumi Sriwijaya Stadium, Palembang, Indonesia	Indonesia	2–0	6–0	2018 AFF Women's Championship
2.	5 July 2018	Bumi Sriwijaya Stadium, Palembang, Indonesia	Singapore	6–0	10–0	2018 AFF Women's Championship
3.	5 July 2018	Bumi Sriwijaya Stadium, Palembang, Indonesia	Singapore	8–0	10–0	2018 AFF Women's Championship
4.	5 July 2018	Bumi Sriwijaya Stadium, Palembang, Indonesia	Singapore	10–0	10–0	2018 AFF Women's Championship
5.	7 July 2018	Bumi Sriwijaya Stadium, Palembang, Indonesia	Philippines	1–0	5–0	2018 AFF Women's Championship
6.	9 July 2018	Bumi Sriwijaya Stadium, Palembang, Indonesia	Myanmar	2–0	3–0	2018 AFF Women's Championship
7.	19 July 2018	Vietnam YTF Center, Hanoi, Vietnam	Chinese Taipei	2–3	4–3	Friendly
8.	19 August 2018	Bumi Sriwijaya Stadium, Palembang, Indonesia	Thailand	2–1	3–2	2018 Asian Games
9.	9 April 2019	Transportation Institute Stadium, Tashkent, Uzbekistan	Jordan	1–0	2–0	2020 AFC Women's Olympic Qualifying Tournament
10.	29 November 2019	Biñan Football Stadium, Biñan, Philippines	Indonesia	2–0	6–0	2019 Southeast Asian Games
11.	29 November 2019	Biñan Football Stadium, Biñan, Philippines	Indonesia	3–0	6–0	2019 Southeast Asian Games
12.	29 September 2021	Pamir Stadium, Dushanbe, Tajikistan	Tajikistan	7–0	7–0	2022 AFC Women's Asian Cup qualification
13.	14 May 2022	Cẩm Phả Stadium, Cẩm Phả, Vietnam	Cambodia	1–0	7–0	2021 Southeast Asian Games
14.	14 May 2022	Cẩm Phả Stadium, Cẩm Phả, Vietnam	Cambodia	4–0	7–0	2021 Southeast Asian Games
15.	29 June 2025	Việt Trì Stadium, Việt Trì, Vietnam	Maldives	4–0	7–0	2026 AFC Women's Asian Cup qualification
16.	2 July 2025	Việt Trì Stadium, Việt Trì, Vietnam	United Arab Emirates	3–0	6–0	2026 AFC Women's Asian Cup qualification
17.	2 July 2025	Việt Trì Stadium, Việt Trì, Vietnam	United Arab Emirates	4–0	6–0	2026 AFC Women's Asian Cup qualification
18.	5 July 2025	Việt Trì Stadium, Việt Trì, Vietnam	Guam	1–0	4–0	2026 AFC Women's Asian Cup qualification
19.	6 August 2025	Lạch Tray Stadium, Haiphong, Vietnam	Cambodia	4–0	6–0	2025 ASEAN Women's Championship
