= Lưu Ngọc Mai =

Vietnamese footballer

Personal information
- Full name: Lưu Ngọc Mai
- Date of birth: 10 May 1974 (age 52)
- Place of birth: Saigon, South Vietnam
- Height: 1.57 m (5 ft 2 in)
- Position: Forward

Team information
- Current team: Hồ Chí Minh City (Assistant coach)

Youth career
- 1998: Ho Chi Minh City

Senior career*
Years	Team	Apps	(Gls)
1998–2005	Hồ Chí Minh City	82	(67)

International career
1998–2003	Vietnam	61	(57)

Managerial career
- 2006–: Hồ Chí Minh City (Assistant coach)
- * Club domestic league appearances and goals

Luu Ngoc Mai (born 10 May 1974) is a former Vietnamese footballer.

== Personal life ==
She was born on 10 May 1974, in Saigon. She is the youngest child in a family of 13 siblings. She belongs to the first generation of Ho Chi Minh City women's football. At Vietnamese Golden Ball 2001, Luu Ngoc Mai went down in history as the only female player to be awarded the Bronze Ball together with male players. After winning the gold medal with the Vietnamese women's football team SEA Games 2003, she decided to retire at the age of 30.

== Honours ==
Hồ Chí Minh City

- Vietnamese Women's Football Championship Champion: 2002

Vietnam

- SEA Games: Gold medal: 2001, 2003

Individual

- Vietnamese Women's Golden Ball: 2001
- Vietnamese Women's Football Championship top scorer: 1999, 2001, 2002

== International goals ==
No.	Date	Venue	Opponent	Score	Result	Competition
1.	26 July 1997	Kuala Lumpur, Malaysia	Myanmar	3–1	3–1	Toh Puan Datuk Seri Saadiah Sardon Trophy
2.	30 July 1997	Kuala Lumpur, Malaysia	Myanmar	1–0	3–2	Toh Puan Datuk Seri Saadiah Sardon Trophy
3.	11 November 1999	Iloilo City, Philippines	Chinese Taipei	1–0	1–4	1999 AFC Women's Championship
4.	23 July 2001	Yangon, Myanmar	Myanmar	1–0	1–2	Friendly
5.	7 August 2001	Lisarow, Australia	Singapore	4–0	6–0	2001 Central Coast Women's Tournament
6.	11 August 2001	Gosford, Australia	Singapore	4–0	4–0	2001 Central Coast Women's Tournament
7.	5 September 2001	Petaling Jaya, Malaysia	Indonesia	3–0	6–0	2001 Southeast Asian Games
8.	5 September 2001	Petaling Jaya, Malaysia	Indonesia	5–0	6–0	2001 Southeast Asian Games
9.	5 September 2001	Petaling Jaya, Malaysia	Indonesia	6–0	6–0	2001 Southeast Asian Games
10.	7 September 2001	Petaling Jaya, Malaysia	Singapore	3–0	5–0	2001 Southeast Asian Games
11.	7 September 2001	Petaling Jaya, Malaysia	Singapore	4–0	5–0	2001 Southeast Asian Games
12.	12 September 2001	Petaling Jaya, Malaysia	Myanmar	1–0	1–1 (a.e.t.) (5–4 p)	2001 Southeast Asian Games
13.	14 September 2001	Petaling Jaya, Malaysia	Thailand	3–0	4–0	2001 Southeast Asian Games
14.	11 June 2003	Nakhon Sawan, Thailand	Uzbekistan	1–0	4–2	2003 AFC Women's Championship
15.	11 June 2003	Nakhon Sawan, Thailand	Uzbekistan	2–0	4–2	2003 AFC Women's Championship
16.	11 June 2003	Nakhon Sawan, Thailand	Uzbekistan	3–0	4–2	2003 AFC Women's Championship
17.	11 June 2003	Nakhon Sawan, Thailand	Uzbekistan	4–1	4–2	2003 AFC Women's Championship
18.	13 June 2003	Nakhon Sawan, Thailand	India	1–0	2–1	2003 AFC Women's Championship
19.	2 December 2003	Hải Phòng, Vietnam	Indonesia	1–0	6–0	2003 Southeast Asian Games
20.	2 December 2003	Hải Phòng, Vietnam	Indonesia	2–0	6–0	2003 Southeast Asian Games
21.	2 December 2003	Hải Phòng, Vietnam	Indonesia	3–0	6–0	2003 Southeast Asian Games
22.	2 December 2003	Hải Phòng, Vietnam	Indonesia	4–0	6–0	2003 Southeast Asian Games
23.	8 December 2003	Hải Phòng, Vietnam	Thailand	1–0	3–1	2003 Southeast Asian Games
24.	4 October 2004	Hồ Chí Minh City, Vietnam	Philippines	4–0	5–0	2004 AFF Women's Championship
