= Dương Thị Vân =

Vietnamese footballer

Personal information
- Date of birth: 20 September 1994 (age 32)
- Place of birth: Bình Lục, Hà Nam, Vietnam
- Height: 1.53 m (5 ft 0 in)
- Position: Midfielder

Team information
- Current team: Thái Nguyên T&T
- Number: 6

Senior career*
Years	Team	Apps	(Gls)
2012–2026	Than KSVN	137	(37)
2026–	Thái Nguyên T&T		

International career^{‡}
2019–	Vietnam	63	(3)
- * Club domestic league appearances and goals ‡ National team caps and goals as of 6 August 2025

Dương Thị Vân (born 20 September 1994) is a Vietnamese footballer who plays as a midfielder for Women's National League club Thái Nguyên T&T and the Vietnam women's national team.

== Career ==
In 2026, Vân signed for Thái Nguyên T&T.

== Career statistics ==
=== International ===
As of match played 6 August 2025

Appearances and goals by national team and year
National Team	Year	Apps	Goals
Vietnam	2019	14	1
Vietnam	2020	4	0
Vietnam	2021	1	0
Vietnam	2022	14	1
Vietnam	2023	17	0
Total		63	3

.Scores and results are list Vietnam's goal tally first.

No.	Cap.	Date	Venue	Opponent	Score	Result	Competition
1.	12.	26 November 2019	Biñan Football Stadium, Biñan, Philippines	Thailand	1–0	1–1	2019 Southeast Asian Games
2.	26.	14 May 2022	Cẩm Phả Stadium, Cẩm Phả, Vietnam	Cambodia	7–0	7–0	2021 Southeast Asian Games
3.	63.	6 August 2025	Lạch Tray Stadium, Haiphong, Vietnam	Cambodia	1–0	6–0	2025 ASEAN Women's Championship
