= Nguyễn Thị Tuyết Ngân =

Vietnamese footballer

Personal information
- Date of birth: 10 February 2000 (age 26)
- Place of birth: Bến Lức, Long An, Vietnam
- Height: 1.57 m (5 ft 2 in)
- Position: Forward

Team information
- Current team: Hồ Chí Minh City I
- Number: 57

Senior career*
Years	Team	Apps	(Gls)
2015–2017	Hồ Chí Minh City II	17	(1)
2018–	Hồ Chí Minh City I	27	(4)

International career^{‡}
2015–2019	Vietnam U20	14	(15)
2019–	Vietnam	10	(1)
- * Club domestic league appearances and goals ‡ National team caps and goals as of 1 November 2023

Nguyễn Thị Tuyết Ngân (born 10 February 2000) is a Vietnamese footballer who plays as a forward for V-Women's League club Hồ Chí Minh City I and the Vietnam women's national team.

== International goals ==
No.	Date	Venue	Opponent	Score	Result	Competition
1.	23 September 2021	Pamir Stadium, Dushanbe, Tajikistan	Maldives	4–0	16–0	2022 AFC Women's Asian Cup qualification
