= Trần Thị Thúy Nga =

Vietnamese footballer

Personal information
- Date of birth: 28 December 1991 (age 34)
- Place of birth: Thanh Trì, Hanoi, Vietnam
- Height: 1.63 m (5 ft 4 in)
- Position: Centre-back

Team information
- Current team: Thái Nguyên T&T
- Number: 6

Senior career*
Years	Team	Apps	(Gls)
2013–	Thái Nguyên T&T	107	(8)

International career^{‡}
2023–	Vietnam	4	(0)
- * Club domestic league appearances and goals ‡ National team caps and goals as of 10 July 2023

Trần Thị Thúy Nga (born 28 December 1991) is a Vietnamese footballer who plays as a centre back for Vietnam Women's Championship club Thái Nguyên T&T and the Vietnamese national team.

== International Apps ==
As of match played 10 July 2023

Appearances and goals by national team and year
National Team	Year	Apps	Goals
Vietnam	2023	4	0
Total		4	0
