= Trần Thị Kim Thanh =

Vietnamese footballer

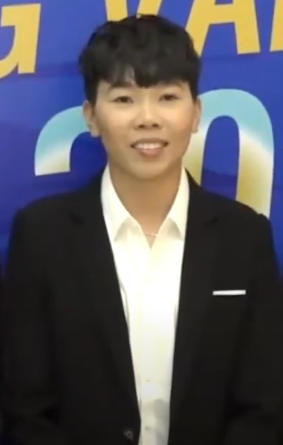
- Kim Thanh in 2022

Personal information
- Date of birth: 18 September 1993 (age 33)
- Place of birth: Đức Hòa, Long An, Vietnam
- Position: Goalkeeper

Team information
- Current team: Hồ Chí Minh City I
- Number: 14

Senior career*
Years	Team	Apps	(Gls)
2010–2024	Hồ Chí Minh City I	84	(0)
2024–2025	Thái Nguyên T&T	22	(0)
2025–	Hồ Chí Minh City I	0	(0)

International career^{‡}
2014–	Vietnam	61	(0)
- * Club domestic league appearances and goals ‡ National team caps and goals as of 19 August 2025

Trần Thị Kim Thanh (born 18 September 1993) is a Vietnamese footballer who plays as a goalkeeper for V-Women's League club Hồ Chí Minh City and the Vietnam women's national team.

== Early life ==
Trần Thị Kim Thanh was born on 18 September 1993 in Đức Hóa, Long An, Vietnam. Trần's father was a construction worker and her mother was a farmhand on a bean farm. Throughout her childhood, Kim Thanh would help her mother harvesting beans in the fields when she returned home from school. Her father recounts struggling financially while raising his children and not having enough money for food.

At the age of 15, Kim Thanh left school and moved away from her hometown to play football in Ho Chi Minh City.

== Club career ==
Kim Thanh spent 14 years playing for Hồ Chí Minh City I. In March 2024, she joined Thái Nguyên T&T after signing a two-year contract deal.

In November 2025, Kim Thanh terminated her contract with Thái Nguyên T&T and returned to Hồ Chí Minh City.

== International career ==
Kim Thanh received her first national team cap in 2014, but did not become a starter until Đặng Thị Kiều Trinh retired in 2018. In one of her first starts as Vietnam's first choice goalkeeper, she conceded 4 goals against Australia's U20 team in the semifinals of the 2018 AFF Women's Championship. After the match, she doubted her ability to start for Vietnam until being consoled by the coaching staff and team captain Huỳnh Như.

Kim Thanh was Vietnam's starting keeper at the 2023 FIFA Women's World Cup, where she rose to international prominence for her heroic goalkeeping display. Prior to their opening match against the United States, Vietnam were expected to lose by a very large margin, and were compared to the Thailand team that lost 0–13 to the United States at the 2019 edition of the tournament. Instead, Kim Thanh kept the scoreline down to a 0-3 loss despite the United States having 26 total shots. She also stopped a penalty from Alex Morgan in the 44th minute.

== Career statistics ==
As of match played 01 August 2023

Appearances and goals by national team and year
National Team	Year	Apps	Goals
Vietnam	2015	3	0
Vietnam	2016	1	0
Vietnam	2017	1	0
Vietnam	2018	4	0
Vietnam	2019	13	0
Vietnam	2020	4	0
Vietnam	2021	2	0
Vietnam	2022	15	0
Vietnam	2023	8	0
Total		51	0
