= Bùi Thúy An =

Vietnamese footballer

Personal information
- Date of birth: 5 October 1990 (age 36)
- Place of birth: Bình Giang, Hải Dương, Vietnam
- Height: 1.61 m (5 ft 3 in)
- Position: Defender

Team information
- Current team: Hà Nội I
- Number: 5

Senior career*
Years	Team	Apps	(Gls)
2007–	Hà Nội I	87	(14)

International career^{‡}
2010–	Vietnam	57	(11)
- * Club domestic league appearances and goals ‡ National team caps and goals as of 24 August 2018

Bùi Thúy An (born 5 October 1990) is a Vietnamese footballer who plays as a defender for Women's Championship club Hà Nội I. She has been a member of the Vietnam women's national team.
