= Sơn La W.F.C. =

Son La Women's
- Full name: Câu lạc bộ bóng đá nữ Sơn La
- Founded: 2011; 15 years ago
- Ground: Sơn La Stadium; Sơn La, Vietnam
- Chairman: Lường Minh Khánh
- Manager: Lường Văn Chuyên
- League: Vietnamese Women's Football Championship
Home colours	Away colours

Son La Women's Football Club (Vietnamese: Câu lạc bộ Bóng đá nữ Sơn La) is a Vietnamese women's football club based in Sơn La. The club plays in the Vietnamese Women's National League. They are currently playing at Sơn La Stadium.

== History ==
The club was founded in 2011 and joined the Vietnamese Women's National League in 2016.
