= Lê Thị Diễm My =

Vietnamese footballer

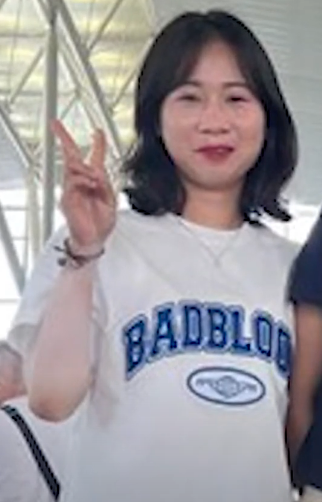
- Diễm My in 2022

Personal information
- Date of birth: 6 March 1994 (age 32)
- Place of birth: Đông Triều, Quảng Ninh, Vietnam
- Height: 1.59 m (5 ft 3 in)
- Position: Defender

Team information
- Current team: Than Khoáng Sản
- Number: 13

Senior career*
Years	Team	Apps	(Gls)
2015–	Than Khoáng Sản	50	(6)

International career^{‡}
2019–	Vietnam	22	(0)
- * Club domestic league appearances and goals ‡ National team caps and goals as of 25 July 2023

Lê Thị Diễm My (born 6 March 1994) is a Vietnamese footballer who plays as a defender for Vietnam Women's Championship club Than Khoáng Sản and the Vietnam women's national team.

== International Apps ==
As of match played 01 August 2023

Appearances and goals by national team and year
National Team	Year	Apps	Goals
Vietnam	2019	1	0
Vietnam	2020	0	0
Vietnam	2021	0	0
Vietnam	2022	5	0
Vietnam	2023	11	0
Total		17	0
