= Hồ Chí Minh City I W.F.C. =

Ho Chi Minh City I Women's
- Full name: Câu lạc bộ bóng đá nữ Thành phố Hồ Chí Minh I
- Short name: HCMCW
- Founded: 1995; 31 years ago
- Ground: Ngãi Giao Stadium
- Capacity: 1,000
- Chairman: Nguyễn Bảo Hoàng
- Manager: Đoàn Thị Kim Chi
- League: V-Women's League
- 2026: V-Women's League, 1st
| Home colours | Away colours |

Ho Chi Minh City I Women's Football Club (Vietnamese: Câu lạc bộ Bóng đá nữ Thành phố Hồ Chí Minh I) is a Vietnamese women professional football club based in Ho Chi Minh City. The club plays in the V-Women's League. They play their home matches at the 1,000-capacity Ngãi Giao Stadium.

== History ==
April 25 (red) vs Hồ Chí Minh City (yellow) during pre-match ceremony during 2026–27 AFC WCL at Kishore Bharati.

Hồ Chí Minh City WFC was established in 1995 by Trần Thành Ngữ, who was the Director of the Hồ Chí Minh City District 1 Sports Center at the time, to promote women's football in the country. The team was one of the first women's football club established after Vietnam's reunification in 1975. The club is the most successful Vietnamese women's team, having won the most league title than any team in the country, including 8 titles in a row from 2019 to 2026.

The club made its continental debut in the inaugural 2024–25 AFC Women's Champions League and reached the semi-finals.

== Honours ==
=== Domestic competitions ===
- Vietnamese Women's National League / V-Women's League

(gold) Winners (15): 2002, 2004, 2005, 2010, 2015, 2016, 2017, 2019, 2020, 2021, 2022, 2023, 2024, 2025, 2026

- Vietnamese Women's National Cup

(gold) Winners (5): 2020, 2021, 2022, 2025, 2026

== Current squad ==
As of 26 October 2026

Note: Flags indicate national team as defined under FIFA eligibility rules; some limited exceptions apply. Players may hold more than one non-FIFA nationality.

| No. | Pos. | Nation | Player |
|---|---|---|---|
| 1 | GK | VIE | Đoàn Thị Ngọc Phượng |
| 2 | DF | VIE | Đỗ Thị Thúy Kiều |
| 3 | MF | VIE | Nguyễn Thị Thùy Linh |
| 4 | DF | USA | Rielly Chesna |
| 5 | FW | VIE | Lê Hoài Lương |
| 6 | MF | VIE | Ngô Thị Hồng Nhung |
| 7 | FW | VIE | Nguyễn Thị Tuyết Ngân |
| 8 | MF | VIE | Cù Thị Huỳnh Như |
| 9 | FW | VIE | Huỳnh Như |
| 10 | MF | VIE | Phan Thị Trang |
| 11 | FW | VIE | K'Thủa |
| 12 | DF | VIE | Phan Thị Ngọc Trâm |
| 14 | GK | VIE | Trần Thị Kim Thanh |
| 15 | DF | VIE | Phạm Thúy An |

| No. | Pos. | Nation | Player |
|---|---|---|---|
| 17 | MF | VIE | Trần Thị Thu Thảo |
| 18 | MF | VIE | Đậu Nguyễn Quỳnh Anh |
| 19 | DF | VIE | Chương Thị Kiều |
| 21 | MF | VIE | Châu Ngọc Bích |
| 22 | MF | VIE | Trần Thị Thu Xuân |
| 24 | MF | VIE | Thị Bích Châm |
| 25 | DF | VIE | Hoàng Thị Kim Quê |
| 28 | DF | VIE | Nguyễn Thị Kim Yên |
| 30 | GK | VIE | Quách Thu Em |
| 44 | DF | VIE | Nguyễn Thị Diễm Huỳnh |
| 58 | DF | PAK | Kayla Siddiqi |
| 72 | MF | VIE | Trần Nguyễn Bảo Châu |
| 77 | FW | BRA | Joelma Church |
| 88 | MF | VIE | Trần Thị Thùy Trang (captain) |

== Managerial history ==
| Name | Period | Honours |
|---|---|---|
| (Vietnam) Trần Anh Tuấn | 1998–2003 | 2002 National League |
| (Vietnam) Trần Tấn Lợi | 2004–2006 | 2004 National League; 2005 National League |
| (Vietnam) Hồ Văn Tam | 2007 | |
| (Vietnam) Trịnh Công Phương | 2008 | |
| (Vietnam) Ngô Lê Bằng | 2009 | |
| (Vietnam) Trần Tấn Lợi | 2010 | |
| (China) Wang Ya Nam | 2010 | 2010 National League |
| (Vietnam) Trần Tấn Lợi | 2011 | |
| (Vietnam) Nguyễn Hữu Thắng | 2012–2014 | |
| (Vietnam) Đoàn Thị Kim Chi | 2015– | 2015 National League; 2016 National League; 2017 National League; 2019 National League; 2020 National Cup; 2020 National League; 2021 National Cup; 2021 National League; 2022 National Cup; 2022 National League; 2023 National League; 2024 National League; 2025 National Cup; 2025 National League; 2026 National Cup; 2026 V-Women's League |

== Continental record ==
Hồ Chí Minh City (yellow) playing against April 25 during 2026–27 AFC WCL group match at Kishore Bharati, Kolkata, India.

AFC Women's Champions League
| Season | Position | Pld | W | D | L | GF | GA | GD |
|---|---|---|---|---|---|---|---|---|
| 2024–25 | Semi-finals | 5 | 3 | 0 | 2 | 11 | 10 | +1 |
| 2025–26 | Quarter-finals | 4 | 2 | 0 | 2 | 3 | 6 | –3 |
| 2026–27 | Group stage | 3 | 0 | 0 | 3 | 2 | 11 | –9 |

All results list Hồ Chí Minh City' goal tally first.

| Season | Round | Club | Score | Aggregate |
|---|---|---|---|---|
| 2024–25 | Group stage | (Chinese Taipei) Taichung Blue Whale | 3–1 | 2nd out of 4 |
| 2024–25 | Group stage | (India) Odisha | 3–1 | 2nd out of 4 |
| 2024–25 | Group stage | (Japan) Urawa Red Diamonds | 0–2 | 2nd out of 4 |
| 2024–25 | Quarter-finals | (United Arab Emirates) Abu Dhabi Country Club | 5–4 | |
| 2024–25 | Semi-finals | (China) Wuhan Jiangda | 0–2 | |
| 2025–26 | Group stage | (Philippines) Stallion Laguna | 1–0 | 2nd out of 4 |
| 2025–26 | Group stage | (Singapore) Lion City Sailors | 2–0 | 2nd out of 4 |
| 2025–26 | Group stage | (Australia) Melbourne City | 0–3 | 2nd out of 4 |
| 2025–26 | Quarter-finals | (North Korea) Naegohyang | 0–3 | |
| 2026–27 | Group stage | (India) East Bengal | 1–2 | 4th out of 4 |
| 2026–27 | Group stage | (North Korea) April 25 | 0–6 | 4th out of 4 |
| 2026–27 | Group stage | (South Korea) Hwacheon KSPO | 1–3 | 4th out of 4 |
