= Đoàn Thị Kim Chi =

Vietnamese association football player and manager (born 1979)

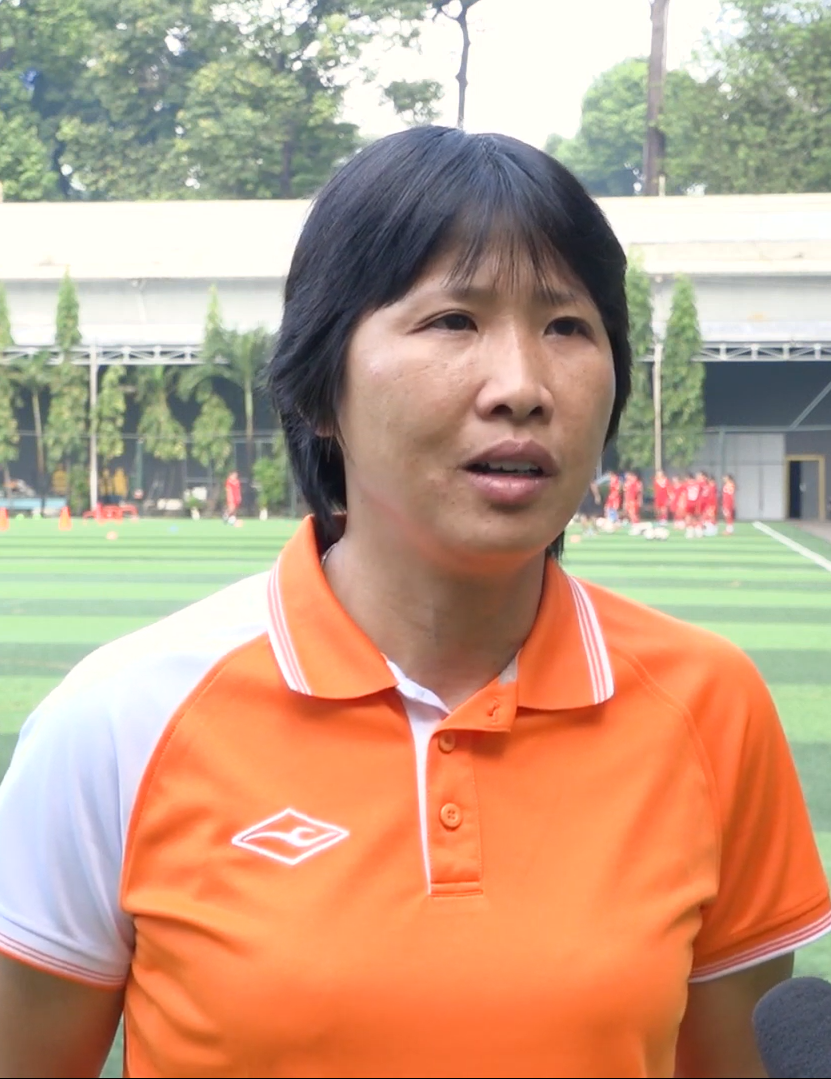

Personal information
- Date of birth: 29 April 1979 (age 47)
- Positions: Midfielder; forward

Đoàn Thị Kim Chi (born 29 April 1979) is a Vietnamese association football manager and former player who is the assistant coach for Vietnam national team and the head coach of Hồ Chí Minh City I.

== Career ==
She won 4 gold medals in Southeast Asian Games with Vietnam in 2001, 2003, 2005, and 2009 and a silver medal in 2007; 4 times were winning Vietnamese Women's Golden Ball ịn 2004, 2005, 2007 and 2009 and one title of AFF Women's Championship in 2006.

She officially retired after winning Vietnamese Women's National League with Hồ Chí Minh I in 2010 and is the head coach of Hồ Chí Minh City I since 2015 and became assistant for Vietnam in 2019.
