= Phong Phú Hà Nam W.F.C. =

- Full name: Câu lạc bộ bóng đá nữ Phong Phú Hà Nam
- Founded: 1 September 1999; 27 years ago
- Ground: Hà Nam Stadium
- Capacity: 20,000
- Chairman: Vũ Bá Nam
- Manager: Nguyễn Thị Khánh Thu
- League: V-Women's League
- 2025: Vietnamese Women's National League, 5th
Home colours	Away colours

Phong Phú Hà Nam Women's Football Club (Vietnamese: Câu lạc bộ Bóng đá nữ Phong Phú Hà Nam) is a Vietnamese women's football club based in Hà Nam ward, Ninh Bình. The club plays in the V-Women's League. Their home stadium is the Hà Nam Stadium.

== History ==
The club was founded on 1 September 1999 as Hà Nam W.F.C in Hà Nam, Vietnam. In 2009, Phong Phú Joint Stock Corporation became the owner of the team and changed the team name to Phong Phú Hà Nam. The club claimed their first league title in 2018 after defeating Hồ Chí Minh City I in the decisive game that took place in the last matchday of the season, thus also ended their 3 years title winning streaks. A year later, in the inauguration edition of the Vietnamese Women's National Cup, Phong Phú Hà Nam managed to become the first ever champion of the tournament after the 1–0 victory against Hà Nội I in the final.

== Honours ==
=== Domestic competitions ===
- Vietnamese Women's National League

(gold) Winners (1): 2018

- Vietnamese Women's National Cup

(gold) Winners (1): 2019

== Current squad ==
As of 1 July 2024

Note: Flags indicate national team as defined under FIFA eligibility rules; some limited exceptions apply. Players may hold more than one non-FIFA nationality.

No.	Pos.	Nation	Player
1	GK	VIE	Trần Thị Trang
2	DF	VIE	Trần Thị Lan Mai
3	DF	VIE	Nguyễn Thị Thùy Linh
4	DF	VIE	Trần Thị Ánh Ngọc
5	DF	VIE	Hà Thị Ngọc Uyên
6	MF	VIE	Vũ Thị Hoa
7	MF	VIE	Nguyễn Thị Tuyết Dung
8	MF	VIE	Nguyễn Thị Liễu
9	FW	VIE	Lưu Hoàng Vân
10	MF	VIE	Nguyễn Thùy Linh I
11	FW	VIE	Trần Thị Lan Anh
12	GK	VIE	Nguyễn Phương Thảo
14	MF	VIE	Nguyễn Thùy Linh II
15	DF	VIE	Đào Thị Ngân
16	DF	VIE	Nguyễn Thị Hạnh
17	MF	VIE	Trịnh Phương Quỳnh

No.	Pos.	Nation	Player
18	MF	VIE	Trương Cẩm Ly
19	DF	VIE	Trần Thị Duyên
20	MF	VIE	Nguyễn Thị Hải Yến
21	FW	VIE	Tạ Thị Thủy
22	DF	VIE	Phạm Thị Tươi
24	GK	VIE	Trần Thị Hải Yến
25	DF	VIE	Lê Hồng Yêu
26	FW	VIE	Ngân Thị Thanh Hiếu
29	DF	VIE	Đinh Thị Hồng Nhung
30	MF	VIE	Cao Thị Linh
32	GK	VIE	Phạm Thị Hồng Ngân
34	DF	VIE	Bùi Thị Hồng Nhung
36	MF	VIE	Nguyễn Phương Anh
37	MF	VIE	Nguyễn Thị Hồng Huế
38	GK	VIE	Lê Thị Thu
39	DF	VIE	Kiều Thị Hoài Anh
