= Thái Nguyên T&T W.F.C. =

Thai Nguyen T&T
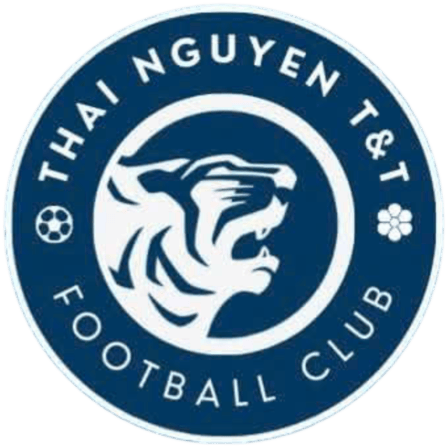
- Full name: Thai Nguyen T&T Women's Football Club
- Founded: 2003; 23 years ago
- Ground: Thái Nguyên Stadium
- Capacity: 22,000
- Chairman: Dương Bảo Đức
- Manager: Đoàn Việt Triều
- League: V-Women's League
- 2026: V-Women's League, 2nd
Home colours	Away colours

Thai Nguyen T&T Women's Football Club (Vietnamese: Câu lạc bộ Bóng đá nữ Thái Nguyên T&T) is a Vietnamese women's football club based in Thái Nguyên. The club is currently playing in the V-Women's League. They play their home matches at the 22,000-capacity Thái Nguyên Stadium.

== History ==
The club was founded in 2003 as Thái Nguyên W.F.C. in Thái Nguyên, Vietnam. In 2020, it was acquired by T&T Group, the same company that helped establishing Hanoi FC, the first fully professionalised football club in the men's V.League 1.

Under the investment of T&T Group, the club aimed to become the first fully professionalised women's football club in Vietnam, hoping to influence other men's football clubs in Vietnam as well as aspiring women's clubs to introduce women's professional football teams. Following a year hiatus due to COVID-19 pandemic, in May 2022, the club made headline as they signed three players professional contracts, the first ever professional contracts being signed to female footballers in Vietnam.

== Current squad ==
As of 1 July 2024

Note: Flags indicate national team as defined under FIFA eligibility rules; some limited exceptions apply. Players may hold more than one non-FIFA nationality.

No.	Pos.	Nation	Player
3	DF	VIE	Lục Thị Tuyết Lan
4	DF	VIE	Nguyễn Thị Ngọc Ánh
5	MF	VIE	Hoàng Thị Ngọc Ánh
6	MF	VIE	Dương Thị Vân
7	MF	VIE	Nguyễn Thị Bích Thùy
8	FW	VIE	Ngọc Minh Chuyên
9	FW	VIE	Lò Thị Hoài
10	MF	VIE	Trần Thị Kim Anh
11	FW	VIE	Mai Diệu Thương
12	MF	VIE	Trần Thị Nhung
14	FW	VIE	Phạm Thị Hiền
15	DF	VIE	Lê Hoài Lương
16	DF	VIE	Nguyễn Thị Nga
17	DF	VIE	Lưu Như Quỳnh
18	MF	VIE	Nguyễn Thị Vạn
19	FW	VIE	Nguyễn Thị Thúy Hằng
20	MF	VIE	Hà Thị Thanh Tâm

No.	Pos.	Nation	Player
21	DF	VIE	Nguyễn Thu Trang
22	GK	VIE	Lê Trịnh Khánh Linh
24	MF	VIE	Lê Thị Thùy Tranh
25	DF	VIE	Nguyễn Thị Mỹ Anh
26	DF	VIE	Phan Thị Thu Thìn
27	MF	VIE	Ma Thị Hồng Ngọc
28	DF	VIE	Trần Thị Thúy Nga
29	DF	VIE	Nguyễn Thị Quỳnh
30	MF	VIE	Lương Thị Xuyến
31	GK	VIE	Trần Thị Vân Anh
32	GK	VIE	Khổng Thị Hằng
33	MF	VIE	Dương Trần Bảo Trân
36	DF	VIE	Lê Thị Như Quỳnh
68	DF	VIE	Trần Thị Thu
98	MF	VIE	Hoàng Thị Biển
99	MF	VIE	Nguyễn Thị Chuyền

== See also ==
- Thai Nguyen FC, men's football team from Thái Nguyên
