= V-Women's League =

- Founded: 1998
- Country: Vietnam
- Confederation: AFC
- Number of clubs: 7
- Level on pyramid: 1
- Domestic cup: Vietnamese Women's National Cup
- International cup: AFC Women's Champions League
- Current champions: Ho Chi Minh City (15th title) (2026)
- Most championships: Ho Chi Minh City (15 titles)
- Broadcasters: ON Football; YouTube (VFF Channel); Facebook (VFF Fanpage)
- Website: Home page
- Current: 2027 V-Women's League

The V-Women's League (Vietnamese: Giải Bóng đá Nữ Vô Địch Quốc Gia, lit. 'Women's National Football League'), also called the Thái Sơn Bắc Cup for sponsorship reasons, is the highest league of women's football in Vietnam. The league was established in 1998 and is currently contested by 7 teams. Defending champions Ho Chi Minh City have won the most championships with 14 titles.

== History ==
In 1998, the first tournament was held with two teams involved: Ho Chi Minh City and Hanoi. Hanoi won the league's first championship and also holds the record of ten championships. Currently the tournament involves 8 teams. The Vietnamese Women's National League was the first football tournament for women in Southeast Asia. However, it is not under the direct jurisdiction of the Vietnam Football Federation, thus the league is entirely made up of amateur or semi-professional players.

In 2022, shortly after the senior side qualified for the 2023 FIFA Women's World Cup, a historic moment occurred when two players from Ho Chi Minh City (Nguyễn Thị Mỹ Anh, Lê Hoài Lương) transferred to Thai Nguyen and were given opportunities with professional contracts, the first in Vietnam's women's football history. After VFF intervention by request of Ho Chi Minh City, the transfers were able to continue after the Southern Vietnamese club secured a guarantee. It was considered a watershed moment for Vietnamese women's football due to its amateur/semi-professional status, sparked debates about whenever Vietnamese Women's National League should be reorganised and enter the new professional era.

In May 2026, the league's international name was rebranded to V-Women's League.

== Format ==
Teams play each other two times per season on a weekly basis. The team with the most points is the champion.

== Teams ==
Locations of the 2024 season teams

Here are the list of teams in the 2026 season:

Team	Location	Manager	2025 season
Hanoi I	Hanoi	(Vietnam) Phùng Thị Minh Nguyệt	2nd
Hanoi II	Hanoi	(Vietnam) Đào Thị Miện	Did not enter
Ho Chi Minh City I	Ho Chi Minh City	(Vietnam) Đoàn Thị Kim Chi	1st
Hồ Chí Minh City II	Ho Chi Minh City	(Vietnam) Lưu Ngọc Mai	6th
Phong Phú Hà Nam	Ninh Bình	(Vietnam) Nguyễn Thị Khánh Thu	5th
Thái Nguyên T&T	Thái Nguyên	(Vietnam) Văn Thị Thanh	4th
Than Khoáng Sản VN	Quảng Ninh	(Vietnam) Đoàn Minh Hải	3rd

=== Former and defunct teams ===
Overview of former and defunct Women's National League teams
Team	Location	Joined	Last season played
Ba Đình District	Hanoi	1998	1998
Cần Thơ	Cần Thơ	2002	2002
Hải Phòng	Haiphong	2002	2002
Lâm Đồng	Lâm Đồng	2003	2003
Long An	Tây Ninh	2002	2003
Quảng Nam	Danang	1998	1998
Quảng Ngãi	Quảng Ngãi	2000	2002
Sóc Sơn	Hanoi	2000	2001
Sơn La	Sơn La	2016	2024
Tiền Giang	Tiền Giang	1998	1998

== Champions ==
Season	Champions	Runners-up	Third place
1998	Hà Nội (1)	Hồ Chí Minh City	Than Việt Nam; Hà Tây
1999	Hà Nội (2)	Hồ Chí Minh City	Than Việt Nam
2000	Hà Nội (3)	Hà Tây	District 1 Hồ Chí Minh City; Than Việt Nam
2001	Hà Nội (4)	Hà Tây	Than Việt Nam
2002	Hồ Chí Minh City (1)	Hà Nội	Hà Tây
2003	Hà Nội (5)	Than Cửa Ông	Hà Tây
2004	Hồ Chí Minh City (2)	Hà Nội	Hà Nam
2005	Hồ Chí Minh City (3)	Hà Tây	Hà Nam
2006	Hà Tây (1)	Hà Nội	Than Cửa Ông
2007	Than KSVN (1)	Hà Tây	Hà Nội
2008	Hà Nội (6)	Than KSVN	Hoà Hợp Hà Tây
2009	Hà Nội (7)	Than KSVN	Hoà Hợp Hà Nội
2010	Hồ Chí Minh City (4)	Hà Nội Tràng An I	Than KSVN
2011	Hà Nội Tràng An I (8)	Phong Phú Hà Nam	Hồ Chí Minh City
2012	Than KSVN (2)	Hà Nội Tràng An I	Hồ Chí Minh City
2013	Hà Nội I (9)	Hồ Chí Minh City I	Phong Phú Hà Nam
2014	Hà Nội I (10)	Phong Phú Hà Nam	Than KSVN
2015	Hồ Chí Minh City I (5)	Hà Nội I	Phong Phú Hà Nam
2016	Hồ Chí Minh City I (6)	Hà Nội I	Phong Phú Hà Nam; Than KSVN
2017	Hồ Chí Minh City I (7)	Phong Phú Hà Nam	Hà Nội I Than KSVN
2018	Phong Phú Hà Nam (1)	Hồ Chí Minh City I	Hà Nội I Than KSVN
2019	Ho Chi Minh City I (8)	Hà Nội I	Than KSVN
2020	Ho Chi Minh City I (9)	Hà Nội I	Than KSVN
2021	Hồ Chí Minh City I (10)	Hà Nội I Watanabe	Than KSVN
2022	Hồ Chí Minh City I (11)	Hà Nội I	Than KSVN
2023	Hồ Chí Minh City I (12)	Than KSVN	Hà Nội I
2024	Hồ Chí Minh City I (13)	Than KSVN	Thái Nguyên T&T
2025	Hồ Chí Minh City I (14)	Hà Nội	Than KSVN
2026	Hồ Chí Minh City I (15)	Thái Nguyên T&T	Hà Nội

== Teams reaching the top three ==
Team	Champions	Runners-up	Third place
Ho Chi Minh City I (District 1 Hồ Chí Minh City)	15 (2002, 2004, 2005, 2010, 2015, 2016, 2017, 2019, 2020, 2021, 2022, 2023, 2024, 2025, 2026)	4 (1998, 1999, 2013, 2018)	3 (2000, 2011, 2012)
Hanoi I (Hà Nội Tràng An I / Hà Nội Watanabe)	10 (1998, 1999, 2000, 2001, 2003, 2008, 2009, 2011, 2013, 2014)	12 (2002, 2004, 2006, 2010, 2012, 2015, 2016, 2019, 2020, 2021, 2022, 2025)	5 (2007, 2017, 2018, 2023, 2026)
Than KSVN (Than Việt Nam / Than Cửa Ông)	2 (2007, 2012)	4 (2008, 2009, 2023, 2024)	14 (1999, 2000, 2001, 2006, 2010, 2014, 2016, 2017, 2018, 2019, 2020, 2021, 2022, 2025)
Hanoi II (Hà Tây / Hòa Hợp Hà Tây)	1 (2006)	4 (2000, 2001, 2005, 2007)	4 (2002, 2003, 2008, 2009)
Phong Phu Ha Nam (Hà Nam)	1 (2018)	3 (2011, 2014, 2017)	5 (2004, 2005, 2013, 2015, 2016)
Thái Nguyên T&T (TNG Thái Nguyên)	–	1 (2026)	1 (2024)

== Individual awards ==
Season	Top scorers			Best player	
Season	Name	Club	Goals	Name	Club
1998	Bùi Thị Hiền Lương	Hà Nội	-	Bùi Thị Hiền Lương	Hà Nội
1999	Nguyễn Khoa Diệu Sinh	Hà Nội	4	Nguyễn Thị Kim Hồng	Hồ Chí Minh City
1999	Lưu Ngọc Mai	Hồ Chí Minh City	4	Nguyễn Thị Kim Hồng	Hồ Chí Minh City
2000	Nguyễn Thị Hà	Hà Nội	5	Quách Thanh Mai	Hà Nội
2001	Nguyễn Thị Hà	Hà Nội	-	Trần Bích Hạnh	Hà Nội
2001	Lưu Ngọc Mai	Hồ Chí Minh City	-	Trần Bích Hạnh	Hà Nội
2002	Lưu Ngọc Mai	Hồ Chí Minh City	12	Phùng Thị Minh Nguyệt	Hà Nội
2003	Vũ Thị Lành	Hà Nam	10	Phùng Thị Minh Nguyệt	Hà Nội
2004	Đỗ Hồng Tiến	Hồ Chí Minh City	8	Quách Thanh Mai	Hà Nội
2005	Nguyễn Thị Thành	Hà Tây	8	Nguyễn Thị Hương	Hà Nam
2006	Đoàn Thị Kim Chi	Hồ Chí Minh City	8	Lê Thị Hoài Thu	Than Cửa Ông
2007	Trịnh Thùy Linh	Hà Tây	8	Đào Thị Miện	Hà Tây
2008	Đỗ Thị Ngọc Châm	Hà Nội I	7	Đỗ Thị Ngọc Châm	Hà Nội I
2009	Đỗ Thị Ngọc Châm	Hà Nội I	7	Đào Thị Miện	Hà Nội I
2010	Đoàn Thị Kim Chi	Hồ Chí Minh City	6	Trần Thị Kim Hồng	Hồ Chí Minh City
2011	Nguyễn Thị Hòa	Hà Nội I	4	Nguyễn Thị Kim Tiến	Hà Nội I
2012	Nguyễn Thị Hòa	Hà Nội I	8	Nguyễn Thị Nguyệt	Phong Phú Hà Nam
2013	Huỳnh Như	Hồ Chí Minh City I	8	Nguyễn Thị Minh Nguyệt	Hà Nội I
2014	Nguyễn Thị Muôn	Hà Nội I	6	Nguyễn Thị Tuyết Dung	Phong Phú Hà Nam
2014	Nguyễn Thị Đăng	TNG Thái Nguyên	6	Nguyễn Thị Tuyết Dung	Phong Phú Hà Nam
2015	Phạm Hải Yến	Hà Nội I	10	Bùi Thúy An	Hà Nội I
2016	Huỳnh Như	Hồ Chí Minh City I	12	Nguyễn Thị Minh Nguyệt	Hà Nội I
2017	Huỳnh Như	Hồ Chí Minh City I	9	Nguyễn Thị Liễu	Hà Nội I
2018	Phạm Hải Yến	Hà Nội I	14	Huỳnh Như	Hồ Chí Minh City I
2019	Phạm Hải Yến	Hà Nội I	17	Huỳnh Như	Hồ Chí Minh City I
2020	Phạm Hải Yến	Hà Nội I Watabe	14	Huỳnh Như	Hồ Chí Minh City I
2021	Huỳnh Như	Hồ Chí Minh City I	7	Huỳnh Như	Hồ Chí Minh City I
2022	Vũ Thị Hoa	Hà Nội I	9	Trần Thị Thùy Trang	Hồ Chí Minh City I
2023	Phạm Hải Yến	Hà Nội I	13	Dương Thị Vân	Than KSVN
2024	Nguyễn Thị Trúc Hương	Than KSVN	14	Nguyễn Thị Tuyết Ngân	Hồ Chí Minh City I
2025	Phạm Hải Yến	Hanoi	6	Trần Thị Thùy Trang	Hồ Chí Minh City I
2026	Nguyễn Thị Bích Thùy	Thái Nguyên T&T	11	Trần Thị Thu Xuân	Hồ Chí Minh City I

== See also ==
- AFC Women's Champions League
