= Hà Nội II W.F.C. =

Hanoi II Women's FC
- Full name: Câu lạc bộ bóng đá nữ Hà Nội 2
- Founded: 1998; 28 years ago as Hà Tây WFC
- Ground: Hà Đông Stadium
- Capacity: 3,000
- Chairman: Hanoi Department of Culture and Sports
- Manager: Đào Thị Miện
- League: V-Women's League
- 2024: Vietnamese Women's National League, 7th
| Home colours | Away colours |

Hà Nội II Women's Football Club (Vietnamese: Câu lạc bộ Bóng đá nữ Hà Nội II) is a Vietnam women's football club, based in Hà Nội, Vietnam. The team plays in the V-Women's League.

The team plays their home matches at the Hà Đông Stadium.

== History ==
The club was founded in 1998 as Hà Tây W.F.C. in Hà Tây, Vietnam. In 2008, Hà Tây province was merged into the city of Hanoi. As the result, in 2009, the club was renamed Hà Nội II W.F.C and became the club the youth squad of Hà Nội I.

== Honours ==
=== Domestic competitions ===
- Vietnamese Women's National League

(gold) Winners (1): 2006

== See also ==
- Hà Nội I W.F.C.
