= Hà Nội I W.F.C. =

Vietnamese football club

Hanoi W.F.C.
- Full name: Hanoi Women's Football Club
- Founded: 1998; 28 years ago (as Hanoi W.F.C.)
- Ground: Hà Đông Stadium
- Capacity: 3,000
- Chairman: Hanoi Department of Culture and Sports
- Manager: Phùng Thị Minh Nguyệt
- League: V-Women's League
- 2026: V-Women's League, 3rd
Home colours	Away colours

Hanoi I Women's Football Club (Vietnamese: Câu lạc bộ Bóng đá nữ Hà Nội I) is a Vietnamese women's football club based in Hà Nội. The club is playing in the V-Women's League.

== History ==
The club has a rich history in Vietnam women's football. Established in 1998, Hanoi competed in every edition of the Vietnamese Women's National League since its inauguration. In the early years of the league, Hà Nội experienced triumph under the management of Chinese coach Jia Guangta as they won the 4 titles in a row from 1998 to 2001. The club won one more league title under Jia Guangta in 2003 before he left the club. Following his departure, Hà Nội struggled to achieve glory again for a few years, before the arrival of the North Korean coach Ri Hwi-chol who relaunched the club with their 6th league title in 2008. Hà Nội won 4 more titles from 2009 until 2014 and became the first team in the league to win 10 titles. However, the following years saw the rise of Hồ Chí Minh City, who dominated the league to the detriment of Hà Nội. As of the 2024 season, the club had not win any title for 10 years.

== Honours ==
=== League ===
- Vietnamese Women's National League

(gold) Winners: 1998, 1999, 2000, 2001, 2003, 2008, 2009, 2011, 2013, 2014

== Current squad ==
As of 1 July 2024

Note: Flags indicate national team as defined under FIFA eligibility rules; some limited exceptions apply. Players may hold more than one non-FIFA nationality.

No.	Pos.	Nation	Player
1	GK	VIE	Nguyễn Thị Loan
3	DF	VIE	Phạm Thị Lan Anh
4	DF	VIE	Nguyễn Thanh Huyền
5	DF	VIE	Hoàng Thị Loan
6	DF	VIE	Nguyễn Thị Tú Anh
7	MF	VIE	Ngân Thị Vạn Sự
8	MF	VIE	Trần Thị Hải Linh
9	FW	VIE	Vũ Thị Hoa
11	MF	VIE	Bùi Thị Thương
12	FW	VIE	Phạm Hải Yến
14	MF	VIE	Nguyễn Thị Thơm
15	DF	VIE	Lê Hà Trang
16	MF	VIE	Thái Thị Thảo
17	GK	VIE	Đào Thị Kiều Oanh

No.	Pos.	Nation	Player
18	MF	VIE	Trịnh Thị Thùy Linh
19	FW	VIE	Nguyễn Thị Thanh Nhã
21	MF	VIE	Nguyễn Kim Anh
22	DF	VIE	Lê Thị Kim Oanh
23	MF	VIE	Hồ Thị Kim Én
24	FW	VIE	Đặng Thanh Thảo
25	GK	VIE	Nguyễn Thị Vân Liên
26	DF	VIE	Nguyễn Kiều Diễm
27	MF	VIE	Biện Thị Hằng
29	DF	VIE	Nguyễn Thị Hoa
31	DF	VIE	Ung Thị Mỹ Trinh
33	MF	VIE	Bạch Thu Hiền
39	MF	VIE	Nguyễn Thị Hằng
43	MF	VIE	Nguyễn Thị Lan Hương

== Managerial history ==
Name	Period	Honours
(China) Jia Guangta	1998–2003	1998 National League; 1999 National League; 2000 National League; 2001 National League; 2003 National League
(Vietnam) Vũ Bá Đông	2004–2007	
(North Korea) Ri Hwi-chol	2008	2008 National League
(Vietnam) Vũ Bá Đông	2009–2010	2009 National League
(China) Jia Guangta	2011	2011 National League
(Vietnam) Đặng Quốc Tuấn	2012–2014	2013 National League; 2014 National League
(Vietnam) Nguyễn Duy Hùng	2015–2016	
(Vietnam) Đặng Quốc Tuấn	2017–2018	
(Japan) Yagi Hidezaku	2018	
(Vietnam) Nguyễn Anh Tuấn	2019–2020	
(South Korea) Jeong Sung-chun	2021–2022	
(Vietnam) Nguyễn Anh Tuấn	2023	
(Vietnam) Đặng Quốc Tuấn	2024–2025	
(Vietnam) Phùng Thị Minh Nguyệt	2026–	

== See also ==
- Hà Nội II W.F.C.
