= Than Khoáng Sản Việt Nam W.F.C. =

Than KSVN
- Full name: Than Khoáng Sản Việt Nam Women's Football Club
- Short name: Than KSVN; TKSVN
- Founded: 1993; 33 years ago
- Ground: Cửa Ông Stadium
- Capacity: 4,000
- Chairman: Trần Xuân Hòa
- Manager: Đoàn Minh Hải
- League: V-Women's League
- 2025: Vietnamese Women's Football Championship, 3rd
Home colours	Away colours

Than Khoáng Sản Việt Nam Women's Football Club (Vietnamese: Câu lạc bộ Bóng đá nữ Than Khoáng Sản Việt Nam), simply known as Than KSVN, is a Vietnamese women's football club based in Quảng Ninh. The club plays in the V-Women's League. They play their home matches at the 4,000-capacity Cửa Ông Stadium.

== History ==
The club was founded in 1993 in Quảng Ninh as the women's football club of tge Than Cẩm Phả company. The club entered the inaugural 1998 Vietnamese Women's National League as Than Việt Nam. The club had since participated in all editions of the Vietnamese Women's Football Championship, having won 2 titles in 2007 and 2012. Than KSVN won their first Vietnamese Cup title in 2023. The team managed to defend their National Cup title in 2024.

== Honours ==
- Vietnamese Women's National League

(gold) Winners (2): 2007, 2012

- Vietnamese Women's National Cup

(gold) Winners (2): 2023, 2024

== Current squad ==
As of 1 July 2024

Note: Flags indicate national team as defined under FIFA eligibility rules; some limited exceptions apply. Players may hold more than one non-FIFA nationality.

No.	Pos.	Nation	Player
2	DF	VIE	Lê Thị Diễm My
3	DF	VIE	Võ Thị Tuyên
5	DF	VIE	Hồ Thị Thanh Thảo
6	MF	VIE	Trần Thị Thu Xuân
8	MF	VIE	Nguyễn Thị Trúc Hương
10	FW	VIE	Nguyễn Thị Hải Yến
11	FW	VIE	Hồ Thị Thanh Mai
12	DF	VIE	Bùi Thị Thúy
15	MF	VIE	Trần Nhật Lan
17	MF	VIE	Đinh Thị Thùy Dung
18	DF	VIE	Lương Thị Thu Thương

No.	Pos.	Nation	Player
20	DF	VIE	Ngô Thị Hè
21	MF	VIE	Nguyễn Thị Thúy
22	DF	VIE	Lê Thị Bảo Trâm
23	MF	VIE	Hà Thị Nhài
24	MF	VIE	Trần Thị Thu Phương
25	DF	VIE	Phan Thị Thu Thìn
26	MF	VIE	Mai Thị Tuyết Dung
27	DF	VIE	Hoàng Thị Thúy Hằng
28	GK	VIE	Trần Thị Ngọc Anh
29	DF	VIE	Phạm Thị Nhâm
30	DF	VIE	Nguyễn Thị Như Quỳnh
