= Football at the 2025 SEA Games – Women's tournament final =

2025 SEA Games women's football final
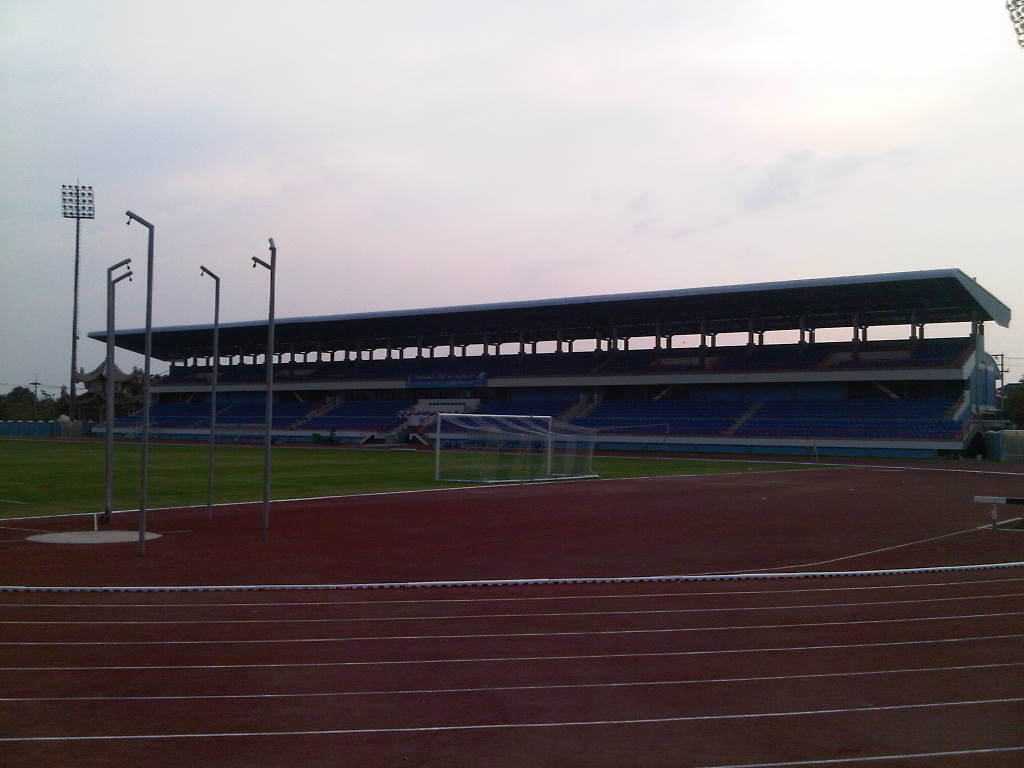
- Chonburi Stadium in Chonburi will host the final
- Event: Football at the 2025 SEA Games – Women's tournament
Philippines	Vietnam
(Philippines)	(Vietnam)
0	0
- After extra time Philippines won 6–5 on penalties
- Date: 17 December 2025
- Venue: Chonburi Stadium, Chonburi
- Referee: Rebecca Anne Durcau (Australia)
- Weather: Partly cloudy 29 °C (84 °F); 56% humidity

The 2025 SEA Games women's football gold medal match (Thai: การแข่งขันฟุตบอลหญิงชิงเหรียญทองซีเกมส์ 2568) was a football match to determine the winners of the women's football tournament at the 2025 SEA Games. The match was the twelfth final of the women's football tournament at the Southeast Asian Games (SEA Games), a biennial tournament contested by the women's national teams of the member associations of the ASEAN Football Federation (AFF) to decide the SEA Games champions. The match took place at Chonburi Stadium in Chonburi, Thailand, on 17 December 2025.

== Background ==
This was Vietnam's eleventh Southeast Asian Games final, having lost both the 2007 and 2013 finals to Thailand. Overall, this was their eleventh major tournament final, having won 8 gold medals in 2001, 2003, 2005, 2009, 2017, 2019, 2021 and 2023 and currently the most gold medals in SEA Games women's football tournament in history.

For the Philippines, this is their first ever appearance in the SEA Games final, having won over Thailand in the semifinals via a penalty shoot-out. Their prior best result were bronze medals in 1985 and 2021. However, there were only three teams participated in the 1985 edition.

Filipino goalkeeper Inna Palacios announced her retirement shortly prior to the final in a bid to encourage her teammates.

== Venue ==
The final was held at the Chonburi Stadium in Chonburi.

The stadium first opened in 2010, and it previously hosted the 2010 Thailand National Games. The stadium is currently used by a Thai football club Chonburi F.C. for Thai League 1 and AFC Cup (now AFC Champions League Two). On the 2012 AFC Cup, the football club used the stadium for all the matches to led the team until semi-finals.

== Route to the final ==
Philippines
Round
Vietnam
Opponent
Result
Group stage
Opponent
Result
Myanmar
1–2
Match 1
Malaysia
7–0
Vietnam
1–0
Match 2
Philippines
0–1
Malaysia
6–0
Match 3
Myanmar
2–0
Group B runner-up

Pos	Team	Pld	Pts
1	Vietnam	3	6
2	Philippines	3	6
3	Myanmar	3	6
4	Malaysia	3	0

Source: Soccerway

Advance to knockout stage

Final standings
Group B winners

Pos	Team	Pld	Pts
1	Vietnam	3	6
2	Philippines	3	6
3	Myanmar	3	6
4	Malaysia	3	0

Source: Soccerway

Advance to knockout stage

Opponent
Result
Knockout stage
Opponent
Result
Thailand
1–1 (a.e.t.)
(4–2 p)
Semi-finals
Indonesia
5–0

== Match ==
=== Details ===
Nguyễn Thị Bích Thùy appeared to have scored first goal of the match for Vietnam in the 29th minute converting an assist from the right flank by Ngân Thị Vạn Sự but was overruled by the referee after Bích Thùy was judged to be offside. Both teams failed to make a goal after regulation time which led to added extra time.

A penalty shootout was held to determine the gold medalists; with the first five players successfully making their respective penalties, the shootout went sudden death. Jaclyn Sawicki converted the Philippines' sixth attempt, but Olivia McDaniel denied Trần Thị Thu's penalty, sealing the Philippines' first-ever SEA Games football gold medal.

17 December 2025
19:30

Philippines	0–0 (a.e.t.)	Vietnam
	Report
Penalties
Guy (penalty scored); Pino (penalty scored); Long (penalty scored); Beard (penalty scored); Markey (penalty scored); Sawicki (penalty scored)	6–5	(penalty scored) Huỳnh Như; (penalty scored) Ngọc Minh Chuyên; (penalty scored) Nguyễn Thị Trúc Hương; (penalty scored) Hoàng Thị Loan; (penalty scored) Cù Thị Huỳnh Như; (penalty missed) Trần Thị Thu

Chonburi Stadium, Chonburi
Referee: Rebecca Durcau (Australia)

Philippines	Vietnam

GK	1	Olivia McDaniel
DF	3	Jessika Cowart		(substituted off) 45'
DF	5	Hali Long (c)
DF	13	Angela Beard
DF	16	Sofia Harrison Wunsch		(substituted off) 57'
MF	6	Jaclyn Sawicki	(yellow card) 89'
MF	8	Sara Eggesvik		(substituted off) 107'
MF	15	Isabella Pasion
MF	19	Alessandrea Carpio		(substituted off) 45'
MF	23	Alexa Pino
FW	21	Mallie Ramirez
Substitutes:
DF	9	Ariana Markey		(substituted on) 45'
DF	7	Jael-Marie Guy		(substituted on) 45'
DF	2	Malea Cesar		(substituted on) 57'
DF	20	Janae DeFazio		(substituted on) 69'	(substituted off) 112'
FW	10	Megan Murray		(substituted on) 107'
FW	14	Meryll Serrano		(substituted on) 112'
Manager:
(Australia) Mark Torcaso

GK	14	Trần Thị Kim Thanh
DF	2	Lương Thị Thu Thương		(substituted off) 45'
DF	5	Hoàng Thị Loan
DF	13	Lê Thị Diễm My
DF	15	Trần Thị Duyên
DF	18	Cù Thị Huỳnh Như
MF	11	Thái Thị Thảo		(substituted off) 78'
MF	19	Nguyễn Thị Thanh Nhã
MF	21	Ngân Thị Vạn Sự	(yellow card) 45'	(substituted off) 90+5'
MF	23	Nguyễn Thị Bích Thùy	(yellow card) 90+1'	(substituted off) 118'
FW	12	Phạm Hải Yến (c)		(substituted off) 78'
Substitutes:
DF	6	Trần Thị Thu		(substituted on) 45'
FW	9	Huỳnh Như	(yellow card) 99'	(substituted on) 78'
DF	10	Trần Thị Hải Linh		(substituted on) 78'
FW	7	Ngọc Minh Chuyên		(substituted on) 90+5'
MF	8	Nguyễn Thị Trúc Hương		(substituted on) 118'
Manager:
Mai Đức Chung

Assistant referees:
Chanthavong Phutsavan (Laos)
Kristina Bersenyova (Turkmenistan)
Fourth official:
Alesar Baddour (Syria)

Match rules

- 90 minutes
- 30 minutes of extra time if necessary
- Penalty shoot-out if scores still level
- Maximum of seven named substitutes
- Maximum of five substitutions, with a sixth allowed in extra time
- Maximum of three substitution opportunities, with a fourth allowed in extra time

== Post-match ==
The Philippines' win resulted to their first-ever SEA Games football gold medal. The women's tournament was historically dominated by Thailand and Vietnam.

The disallowed goal in the first half was met with controversy. Vietnam coach Mai Đức Chung criticized the overall standard of officiating in the women's football tournament also remarking a disallowed penalty in a group stage match. Assistant referee Chanthavong Phutsavan of Laos was flooded with angry reaction by Vietnamese fans on her social media posts. The Asian Football Confederation reportedly acknowledged as a "serious mistake" saying it will be reviewed to prevent similar incidents in the future.

== See also ==
- Football at the 2025 SEA Games – Men's tournament final
