= Football at the 2025 SEA Games – Women's tournament – Knockout stage =

The knockout stage of the women's football tournament at the 2025 SEA Games was played from 14 to 17 December 2025. The top two teams from each group in the group stage qualified for the knockout stage.

== Format ==
In the knockout stage, if a match was level at the end of regulation time, extra time was played (two periods of 15 minutes each), and followed, if necessary, by a penalty shoot-out to determine the winner.

== Qualified teams ==
The top two placed teams from each of the two groups qualified for the knockout stage.

Group	Winners	Runners-up
A	Thailand	Indonesia
B	Vietnam	Philippines

== Bracket ==
Semi-finals
14 December – Chonburi
Thailand	1 (2)
Philippines (p)	1 (4)
14 December – Chonburi
Vietnam	5
Indonesia	0

Gold medal match
17 December – Chonburi
Philippines (p)	0 (6)
Vietnam	0 (5)
Bronze medal match
17 December – Chonburi
Thailand	2
Indonesia	0

== Semi-finals ==
=== Vietnam vs Indonesia ===
14 December 2025
16:00

Vietnam	5–0	Indonesia
Nguyễn Thị Bích Thùy 28' (pen.), 80'; Phạm Hải Yến 49', 58'; Huỳnh Như 86'	Report

IPE Chonburi Stadium, Chonburi
Referee: Alesar Baddour (Syria)

Vietnam	Indonesia

Manager: Mai Đức Chung	Manager: (Japan) Akira Higashiyama

Assistant referees:
Phutsavan Chantavong (Laos)
Salma Akter Mone (Bangladesh)
Fourth official:
Rawdha Qatami Eissa Saeed Almansoori (United Arab Emirates)

=== Thailand vs Philippines ===
14 December 2025
18:30

Thailand	1–1 (a.e.t.)	Philippines
Jiraporn 53'	Report	Guy 87' (pen.)
Penalties
Jiraporn (penalty scored); Taneekarn (penalty scored); Pluemjai (penalty missed); Orapin (penalty missed)	2–4	(penalty scored) Guy; (penalty scored) Carpio; (penalty scored) Eggesvik; (penalty scored) Long

Chonburi Stadium, Chonburi
Referee: Esra'a Almbaidin (Jordan)

Thailand	Philippines

Manager: Nuengrutai Srathongvian	Manager: (Australia) Mark Torcaso

Assistant referees:
Merina Dhimal (Sri Lanka)
Eman Abdalrhman Al Madany (Saudi Arabia)
Fourth official:
Rebecca Anne Durcau (Australia)

== Bronze medal match ==
17 December 2025
15:30

Thailand	2–0	Indonesia
Pitsamai 17'; Pattaranan 43'	Report

Chonburi Stadium, Chonburi
Referee: Gulshoda Saitkulova (Uzbekistan)

Thailand	Indonesia

GK	22	Chotmanee Thongmongkol	(yellow card) 90+3'
DF	3	Supaporn Inthraprasit
DF	5	Panitha Jiratanaphibun
MF	8	Pluemjai Sontisawat		(substituted off) 90+1'
MF	11	Chatchawan Rodthong
MF	13	Sunisa Srangthaisong
MF	19	Pitsamai Sornsai (c)
MF	20	Rhianne Rush		(substituted off) 85'
FW	9	Jiraporn Mongkoldee		(substituted off) 77'
FW	21	Pattaranan Aupachai		(substituted off) 77'
FW	23	Natalie Olson		(substituted off) 45'
Substitutes:
FW	16	Madison Casteen		(substituted in) 45'
FW	2	Uraiporn Yongkul		(substituted in) 77'
FW	10	Kanyanat Chetthabutr		(substituted in) 77'
MF	12	Nutwadee Pramnak		(substituted in) 85'
FW	17	Taneekarn Dangda		(substituted in) 90+1'
Manager:
Nuengrutai Srathongvian

GK	1	Iris de Rouw
DF	2	Remini Rumbewas
DF	4	Emily Nahon
DF	5	Gea Yumanda
DF	12	Zahra Muzdalifah (c)
MF	15	Helsya Maeisyaroh
MF	7	Felicia de Zeeuw	(substituted off) 55'
MF	8	Reva Octaviani	(substituted off) 90+2'
FW	10	Sheva Imut	(substituted off) 77'
FW	14	Isa Warps	(substituted off) 45'
FW	18	Marsela Awi	(substituted off) 55'
Substitutes:
MF	16	Rosdilah Nurrohmah	(substituted in) 45'
FW	9	Claudia Scheunemann	(substituted in) 55'
MF	7	Felicia de Zeeuw	(substituted in) 55'
MF	6	Nafeeza Nori	(substituted in) 77'
FW	20	Ajeng Sri Handayani	(substituted in) 90+2'
Manager:
(Japan) Akira Higashiyama

Assistant referees:
Rahmonova Dilshoda (Tajikistan)
Salma Akter Mone (Bangladesh)
Fourth official:
Rawdha Qatami Eissa Saeed Almansoori (United Arab Emirates)

== Gold medal match ==
17 December 2025
19:30

Philippines	0–0 (a.e.t.)	Vietnam
	Report
Penalties
Guy (penalty scored); Pino (penalty scored); Long (penalty scored); Beard (penalty scored); Markey (penalty scored); Sawicki (penalty scored)	6–5	(penalty scored) Huỳnh Như; (penalty scored) Ngọc Minh Chuyên; (penalty scored) Nguyễn Thị Trúc Hương; (penalty scored) Hoàng Thị Loan; (penalty scored) Cù Thị Huỳnh Như; (penalty missed) Trần Thị Thu

Chonburi Stadium, Chonburi
Referee: Rebecca Durcau (Australia)

Philippines	Vietnam

GK	1	Olivia McDaniel
DF	3	Jessika Cowart		(substituted off) 45'
DF	5	Hali Long (c)
DF	13	Angela Beard
DF	16	Sofia Harrison Wunsch		(substituted off) 57'
MF	6	Jaclyn Sawicki	(yellow card) 89'
MF	8	Sara Eggesvik		(substituted off) 107'
MF	15	Isabella Pasion
MF	19	Alessandrea Carpio		(substituted off) 45'
MF	23	Alexa Pino
FW	21	Mallie Ramirez
Substitutes:
DF	9	Ariana Markey		(substituted in) 45'
DF	7	Jael-Marie Guy		(substituted in) 45'
DF	2	Malea Cesar		(substituted in) 57'
DF	20	Janae DeFazio		(substituted in) 69'	(substituted off) 112'
FW	10	Megan Murray		(substituted in) 107'
FW	14	Meryll Serrano		(substituted in) 112'
Manager:
(Australia) Mark Torcaso

GK	14	Trần Thị Kim Thanh
DF	2	Lương Thị Thu Thương		(substituted off) 45'
DF	5	Hoàng Thị Loan
DF	13	Lê Thị Diễm My
DF	15	Trần Thị Duyên
DF	18	Cù Thị Huỳnh Như
MF	11	Thái Thị Thảo		(substituted off) 78'
MF	19	Nguyễn Thị Thanh Nhã
MF	21	Ngân Thị Vạn Sự	(yellow card) 45'	(substituted off) 90+5'
MF	23	Nguyễn Thị Bích Thùy	(yellow card) 90+1'	(substituted off) 118'
FW	12	Phạm Hải Yến (c)		(substituted off) 78'
Substitutes:
DF	6	Trần Thị Thu		(substituted in) 45'
FW	9	Huỳnh Như	(yellow card) 99'	(substituted in) 78'
DF	10	Trần Thị Hải Linh		(substituted in) 78'
FW	7	Ngọc Minh Chuyên		(substituted in) 90+5'
MF	8	Nguyễn Thị Trúc Hương		(substituted in) 118'
Manager:
Mai Đức Chung

Assistant referees:
Chanthavong Phutsavan (Laos)
Kristina Bersenyova (Turkmenistan)
Fourth official:
Alesar Baddour (Syria)
