= Football at the 2025 SEA Games – Women's tournament – Group B =

Group B of the women's football tournament at the 2025 SEA Games was played from 5 to 11 December 2025. The group, one of two 4-team groups competing in the group stage of the SEA Games tournament, consisted of Vietnam, Myanmar, the Philippines and Malaysia.

== Teams ==
Draw position	Team	SEA Games appearance	Last appearance	Previous best performance
B1	Vietnam	12th	2023	Gold medalists (2001, 2003, 2005, 2009, 2017, 2019, 2021, 2023)
B2	Myanmar	13th	2023	Silver medalists (1997, 2003, 2005, 2023)
B3	Philippines	13th	2023	Bronze medalists (1985, 2021)
B4	Malaysia	11th	2019	Silver medalists (1997)

== Standings ==
Pos	Team	Pld	W	D	L	GF	GA	GD	Pts	Qualification
1	Vietnam	3	2	0	1	9	1	+8	6	Advance to knockout stage
2	Philippines	3	2	0	1	8	2	+6	6	Advance to knockout stage
3	Myanmar	3	2	0	1	5	3	+2	6	
4	Malaysia	3	0	0	3	0	16	−16	0	

Source: Soccerway
Rules for classification: Group stage tiebreakers

== Matches ==
=== Myanmar vs Philippines ===
5 December 2025
16:00

Myanmar	2–1	Philippines
Win Theingi Tun 4'; May Htet Lu 89'	Report	Ramirez 69'

IPE Chonburi Stadium, Chonburi
Referee: Sunita Thongthawin (Thailand)

Myanmar	Philippines

Manager: (Japan) Tetsuro Uki	Manager: (Australia) Mark Torcaso

Assistant referees:
Yang-Chen Yen (Chinese Taipei)
Merina Dhimal (Nepal)
Fourth official:
Alesar Baddour (Syria)

=== Vietnam vs Malaysia ===
5 December 2025
18:30

Vietnam	7–0	Malaysia
Phạm Hải Yến 4', 26'; Nguyễn Thị Bích Thùy 23'; Trần Thị Hải Linh 36'; Thái Thị Thảo 48', 59', 78'	Report

Chonburi Stadium, Chonburi
Referee: Rawdha Almansoori (United Arab Emirates)

Vietnam	Malaysia

Manager: Mai Đức Chung	Manager: (Brazil) Joel Cornelli

Assistant referees:
Malika Madhushani (Sri Lanka)
Eman Almadany (Saudi Arabia)
Fourth official:
Gulshoda Saidqulova (Uzbekistan)

=== Malaysia vs Myanmar ===
8 December 2025
16:00

Malaysia	0–3	Myanmar
	Report	San Thaw Thaw 25'; May Htet Lu 35'; Win Theingi Tun 64'

IPE Chonburi Stadium, Chonburi
Referee: Alesar Baddour (Syria)

Malaysia	Myanmar

Manager: (Brazil) Joel Cornelli	Manager: (Japan) Tetsuro Uki

Assistant referees:
Yang-Chen Yen (Chinese Taipei)
Merina Dhimal (Nepal)
Fourth official:
Azusa Sugino (Japan)

=== Philippines vs Vietnam ===
8 December 2025
18:30

Philippines	1–0	Vietnam
Ramirez 90+4'	Report

Chonburi Stadium, Chonburi
Referee: Gulshoda Saidqulova (Uzbekistan)

Philippines	Vietnam

Manager: (Australia) Mark Torcaso	Manager: Mai Đức Chung

Assistant referees:
Eman Almadany (Saudi Arabia)
Kristina Bersenyova (Turkmenistan)
Fourth official:
Rawdha Eissa Saeed Almansoori (United Arab Emirates)

=== Philippines vs Malaysia ===
11 December 2025
16:00

Philippines	6–0	Malaysia
Pino 45', 53', 70' (pen.); Cowart 68'; Markey 85'; Castañeda 90+6'	Report

IPE Chonburi Stadium, Chonburi
Referee: Sunita Thongthawin (Thailand)

Philippines	Malaysia

Manager: (Australia) Mark Torcaso	Manager: (Brazil) Joel Cornelli

Assistant referees:
Kristina Bersenyova (Turkmenistan)
Eman Almandany (Saudi Arabia)
Fourth official:
Rawdha Eissa Saeed Almansoori (United Arab Emirates)

=== Vietnam vs Myanmar ===
11 December 2025
16:00

Vietnam	2–0	Myanmar
Ngân Thị Vạn Sự 8'; Nguyễn Thị Bích Thùy 14'	Report

Chonburi Stadium, Chonburi
Referee: Esra'a Almbaidin (Jordan)

Vietnam	Myanmar

Manager: Mai Đức Chung	Manager: (Japan) Tetsuro Uki

Assistant referees:
Yang-Chen Yen (Chinese Taipei)
H.M. Malika Madhushani (Sri Lanka)
Fourth official:
Gulshoda Saidqulova (Uzbekistan)
