= 2026 AFC Women's Asian Cup Group C =

Football results

Group C of 2026 AFC Women's Asian Cup was played from 4 to 10 March 2026. The group was made up of Japan, Vietnam, India and Chinese Taipei. The top two teams, Japan and Chinese Taipei, advanced to the quarter-finals.

== Teams ==
Draw position	Team	Zone	Pot	Method of qualification	Date of qualification	Finals appearance	Last appearance	Previous best performance	FIFA Rankings June 2025 (Note: The June 2025 FIFA Women's World Ranking was used for seeding for the final draw.)	FIFA Rankings December 2025
C1	Japan	EAFF	1	2022 third place	18 December 2024	18th	2022	Winners (2014, 2018)	8	8
C2	Vietnam	AFF	2	Group E winners	5 July 2025	10th	2022	Sixth place (2014, 2022)	37	36
C3	India	SAFF	4	Group C winners	5 July 2025	10th	2022	Runners-up (1979, 1983)	63	67
C4	Chinese Taipei	EAFF	3	Group F winners	5 July 2025	15th	2022	Winners (1977, 1979, 1981)	42	40

== Standings ==
Pos	Team	Pld	W	D	L	GF	GA	GD	Pts	Qualification
1	Japan	3	3	0	0	17	0	+17	9	Advance to knockout stage
2	Chinese Taipei	3	2	0	1	4	3	+1	6	Advance to knockout stage
3	Vietnam	3	1	0	2	2	6	−4	3	
4	India	3	0	0	3	2	16	−14	0	

Source: AFC

== Matches ==
=== Japan vs Chinese Taipei ===
4 March 2026
13:00 UTC+8

Japan	2–0	Chinese Taipei
Tanikawa 61'; Seike 90+2'	Report (AFC); Report (FIFA)

Perth Rectangular Stadium, Perth
Attendance: 1,223
Referee: Oh Hyeon-jeong (South Korea)

GK	1	Ayaka Yamashita
DF	2	Risa Shimizu	(substituted off) 64'
DF	3	Moeka Minami
DF	5	Hana Takahashi
DF	13	Hikaru Kitagawa	(substituted off) 75'
MF	10	Fuka Nagano
MF	14	Yui Hasegawa (c)
MF	19	Momoko Tanikawa	(substituted off) 75'
FW	11	Mina Tanaka	(substituted off) 85'
FW	15	Aoba Fujino
FW	17	Maika Hamano	(substituted off) 64'
Substitutions:
MF	8	Kiko Seike	(substituted on) 64'
DF	21	Miyabi Moriya	(substituted on) 64'
MF	7	Hinata Miyazawa	(substituted on) 75'
FW	25	Remina Chiba	(substituted on) 75'
FW	26	Maya Hijikata	(substituted on) 85'
Manager:
(Denmark) Nils Nielsen

GK	1	Wang Yu-ting
DF	2	Chang Chi-lan	(yellow card) 84'	(substituted off) 90+3'
DF	3	Su Sin-yun		(substituted off) 67'
DF	9	Hsu Yi-yun
DF	20	Chen Ying-hui (c)
DF	22	Huang Ke-sin
MF	10	Saki Matsunaga
MF	14	Wu Kai-Ching
MF	17	Chen Jin-wen		(substituted off) 66'
MF	21	Chen Yu-chin		(substituted off) 90+3'
FW	12	Pu Hsin-hui		(substituted off) 26'
Substitutions:
FW	26	Yang Hsiao-chuan		(substituted on) 26'
FW	16	Liu Yu-chiao		(substituted on) 66'
DF	6	Teng Pei-lin		(substituted on) 67'
DF	8	Li Yi-wen		(substituted on) 90+3'
DF	24	Pan Yen-hsin		(substituted on) 90+3'
Manager:
(Thailand) Prasobchoke Chokemor

Player of the Match:
(Japan) Aoba Fujino

Assistant referees:
Park Mi-suk (South Korea)
Lee Soo-bin (South Korea)
Fourth official:
Dong Fangyu (China)
Video assistant referee:
Meshari Al-Shamari (Qatar)
Assistant video assistant referee:
Kim Hee-gon (South Korea)

Statistics	Japan	Chinese Taipei
Possession	89.5%	10.5%
Shots	30	1
Shots on target	10	0
Passes	749	90
Fouls committed	5	7
Corner kicks	10	0

=== Vietnam vs India ===
4 March 2026
19:00 UTC+8

Vietnam	2–1	India
Ngân Thị Vạn Sự 30', 90+4'	Report (AFC); Report (FIFA)	Nongrum 52'

Perth Rectangular Stadium, Perth
Attendance: 1,961
Referee: Kim Yu-jeong (South Korea)

GK	14	Trần Thị Kim Thanh
DF	13	Lê Thị Diễm My		(substituted off) 90+7'
DF	15	Trần Thị Duyên
DF	17	Trần Thị Thu Thảo
DF	18	Cù Thị Huỳnh Như
DF	19	Nguyễn Thị Thanh Nhã
MF	9	Huỳnh Như (c)		(substituted off) 46'
MF	11	Thái Thị Thảo		(substituted off) 65'
MF	16	Dương Thị Vân
MF	21	Ngân Thị Vạn Sự		(substituted off) 90+7'
FW	23	Nguyễn Thị Bích Thùy
Substitutions:
FW	12	Phạm Hải Yến		(substituted on) 46'
DF	10	Trần Thị Hải Linh		(substituted on) 65'
MF	26	Vũ Thị Hoa	(yellow card) 83'	(substituted on) 65'
DF	2	Lương Thị Thu Thương		(substituted on) 90+7'
FW	7	Ngọc Minh Chuyên		(substituted on) 90+7'
Manager:
Mai Đức Chung

GK	1	Panthoi Chanu Elangbam
DF	2	Sweety Devi Ngangbam (c)
DF	8	Sanju Yadav
DF	14	Nirmala Devi Phanjoubam	(yellow card) 76'
DF	15	Martina Thokchom
MF	4	Shilky Devi Hemam	(yellow card) 26'
MF	6	Sangita Basfore
MF	7	Soumya Guguloth		(substituted off) 46'
MF	10	Pyari Xaxa		(substituted off) 80'
FW	11	Grace Dangmei		(substituted off) 46'
FW	16	Manisha Kalyan		(substituted off) 90+3'
Substitutions:
FW	17	Rimpa Haldar		(substituted on) 46'
FW	20	Sanfida Nongrum	(yellow card) 70'	(substituted on) 46'
FW	26	Kaviya Pakkirisamy		(substituted on) 80'
FW	12	Lynda Kom		(substituted on) 90+3'
Manager:
(Costa Rica) Amelia Valverde

Player of the Match:
(Vietnam) Ngân Thị Vạn Sự

Assistant referees:
Heba Saadieh (Palestine)
Supawan Hinthong (Thailand)
Fourth official:
Mahnaz Zokaee (Iran)
Video assistant referee:
Muhammad Taqi (Singapore)
Assistant video assistant referee:
Law Bik Chi (Hong Kong)

Statistics	Vietnam	India
Possession	63.7%	36.3%
Shots	11	9
Shots on target	6	4
Passes	491	283
Fouls committed	6	11
Corner kicks	1	2

=== Chinese Taipei vs Vietnam ===
7 March 2026
13:00 UTC+8

Chinese Taipei	1–0	Vietnam
Su Yu-hsuan 26'	Report (AFC); Report (FIFA)

Perth Rectangular Stadium, Perth
Attendance: 1,784
Referee: Lara Lee (Australia)

GK	1	Wang Yu-ting
DF	2	Chang Chi-lan	(substituted off) 84'
DF	3	Su Sin-yun
MF	9	Hsu Yi-yun
MF	10	Saki Matsunaga
MF	14	Wu Kai-Ching	(substituted off) 85'
FW	17	Chen Jin-wen
FW	19	Su Yu-hsuan	(substituted off) 56'
DF	20	Chen Ying-hui (c)	(substituted off) 68'
MF	21	Chen Yu-chin
FW	22	Huang Ke-sin
Substitutions:
DF	5	Pan Shin-yu	(substituted on) 68'
DF	8	Li Yi-wen	(substituted on) 56'
MF	24	Pan Yen-hsin	(substituted on) 84'
FW	15	Tseng Yun-ching	(substituted on) 85'
MF	11	He Jia-shiuan	(substituted on) 45'
Manager:
(Thailand) Prasobchoke Chokemor

GK	14	Trần Thị Kim Thanh
MF	11	Thái Thị Thảo
FW	12	Phạm Hải Yến		(substituted off) 45'
DF	13	Lê Thị Diễm My
MF	15	Trần Thị Duyên		(substituted off) 79'
MF	16	Dương Thị Vân		(substituted off) 45'
DF	17	Trần Thị Thu Thảo
MF	18	Cù Thị Huỳnh Như		(substituted off) 66'
MF	19	Nguyễn Thị Thanh Nhã	(yellow card) 86'	(substituted off) 90+1'
MF	21	Ngân Thị Vạn Sự
FW	23	Nguyễn Thị Bích Thùy		(substituted off) 80'
Substitutions:
DF	6	Nguyễn Thị Hoa		(substituted on) 79'
FW	7	Ngọc Minh Chuyên		(substituted on) 90+1'
MF	8	Nguyễn Thị Trúc Hương		(substituted on) 80'
FW	9	Huỳnh Như		(substituted on) 45'
DF	10	Trần Thị Hải Linh		(substituted on) 45'
Manager:
Mai Đức Chung

Player of the Match:
(Chinese Taipei) Su Sin-yun

Assistant referees:
Emma Kocbek (Australia)
Madelaine Allum (Australia)
Fourth official:
Casey Reibelt (Australia)
Video assistant referee:
Kate Jacewicz (Australia)
Assistant video assistant referee:
Meshari Al-Shamari (Qatar)

Statistics	Chinese Taipei	Vietnam
Possession	54.5%	45.5%
Shots	6	7
Shots on target	2	3
Passes	330	275
Fouls committed	12	14
Corner kicks	3	1

=== India vs Japan ===
7 March 2026
19:00 UTC+8

India	0–11	Japan
	Report (AFC); Report (FIFA)	Yamamoto 4'; Hasegawa 13'; Miyazawa 20', 35', 81'; Seike 45+5' (pen.), 55'; Ueki 47', 50', 65'; Hijikata 62'

Perth Rectangular Stadium, Perth
Attendance: 3,233
Referee: Veronika Bernatskaia (Kyrgyzstan)

GK	1	Panthoi Chanu Elangbam
DF	2	Sweety Devi Ngangbam (c)
DF	5	Juli Kishan
DF	8	Sanju Yadav		(substituted off) 73'
DF	15	Martina Thokchom
DF	21	Sarita Yumnam
MF	6	Sangita Basfore
MF	7	Soumya Guguloth		(substituted off) 73'
MF	19	Aveka Singh	(yellow card) 53'	(substituted off) 57'
FW	10	Pyari Xaxa		(substituted off) 57'
FW	16	Manisha Kalyan		(substituted off) 88'
Substitutions:
FW	11	Grace Dangmei		(substituted on) 57'
MF	24	Babina Devi Lisham		(substituted on) 57'
DF	3	Astam Oraon		(substituted on) 73'
FW	26	Kaviya Pakkirisamy		(substituted on) 73'
FW	12	Lynda Kom		(substituted on) 88'
Manager:
(Costa Rica) Amelia Valverde

GK	12	Chika Hirao
DF	4	Saki Kumagai
DF	6	Tōko Koga
DF	16	Yuzuki Yamamoto	(substituted off) 63'
DF	21	Miyabi Moriya
MF	7	Hinata Miyazawa
MF	14	Yui Hasegawa (c)	(substituted off) 46'
MF	18	Honoka Hayashi
MF	8	Kiko Seike	(substituted off) 63'
FW	11	Mina Tanaka	(substituted off) 46'
FW	25	Remina Chiba	(substituted off) 46'
Substitutions:
FW	9	Riko Ueki	(substituted on) 46'
MF	24	Yui Narumiya	(substituted on) 46'
FW	26	Maya Hijikata	(substituted on) 46'
DF	3	Moeka Minami	(substituted on) 63'
FW	17	Maika Hamano	(substituted on) 63'
Manager:
(Denmark) Nils Nielsen

Player of the Match:
(Japan) Hinata Miyazawa

Assistant referees:
Sabreen Ala'badi (Jordan)
Hyon Un-mi (North Korea)
Fourth official:
Oh Hyeon-jeong (South Korea)
Video assistant referee:
Kim Hee-gon (South Korea)
Assistant video assistant referee:
Muhammad Taqi (Singapore)

Statistics	India	Japan
Possession	20.1%	79.9%
Shots	0	35
Shots on target	0	16
Passes	161	613
Fouls committed	7	1
Corner kicks	0	7

=== Japan vs Vietnam ===
10 March 2026
17:00 UTC+8

Japan	4–0	Vietnam
Ueki 21'; Hamano 51'; Fujino 64'; Seike 67'	Report (AFC); Report (FIFA)

Perth Rectangular Stadium, Perth
Attendance: 3,648
Referee: Kim Yu-jeong (South Korea)

GK	1	Ayaka Yamashita
DF	2	Risa Shimizu
DF	4	Saki Kumagai	(substituted off) 63'
DF	5	Hana Takahashi
DF	13	Hikaru Kitagawa	(substituted off) 46'
MF	10	Fuka Nagano
MF	14	Yui Hasegawa (c)	(substituted off) 46'
MF	19	Momoko Tanikawa	(substituted off) 82'
FW	9	Riko Ueki	(substituted off) 46'
FW	15	Aoba Fujino
FW	17	Maika Hamano	(substituted off) 63'
Substitutions:
DF	6	Tōko Koga	(substituted on) 46'
MF	7	Hinata Miyazawa	(substituted on) 46'
FW	11	Mina Tanaka	(substituted on) 46'
MF	8	Kiko Seike	(substituted on) 63'
DF	16	Yuzuki Yamamoto	(substituted on) 63'
FW	26	Maya Hijikata	(substituted on) 82'
Manager:
(Denmark) Nils Nielsen

GK	20	Khổng Thị Hằng
DF	2	Lương Thị Thu Thương	(substituted off) 86'
DF	10	Trần Thị Hải Linh
DF	13	Lê Thị Diễm My (c)
DF	15	Trần Thị Duyên
DF	17	Trần Thị Thu Thảo	(substituted off) 70'
MF	11	Thái Thị Thảo	(substituted off) 70'
MF	18	Cù Thị Huỳnh Như
MF	21	Ngân Thị Vạn Sự
MF	26	Vũ Thị Hoa	(substituted off) 90+2'
FW	24	Nguyễn Thị Thúy Hằng	(substituted off) 62'
Substitutions:
MF	9	Huỳnh Như	(substituted on) 62'
MF	16	Dương Thị Vân	(substituted on) 70' (substituted off) 86'
FW	23	Nguyễn Thị Bích Thùy	(substituted on) 70'
DF	5	Hoàng Thị Loan	(substituted on) 86'
MF	8	Nguyễn Thị Trúc Hương	(substituted on) 86'
DF	6	Nguyễn Thị Hoa	(substituted on) 90+2'
Manager:
Mai Đức Chung

Player of the Match:
(Japan) Maika Hamano

Assistant referees:
Heba Saadieh (Palestine)
Supawan Hinthong (Thailand)
Fourth official:
Pansa Chaisanit (Thailand)
Video assistant referee:
Kim Hee-gon (South Korea)
Assistant video assistant referee:
Muhammad Taqi (Singapore)

Statistics	Japan	Vietnam
Possession	80.5%	19.5%
Shots	27	1
Shots on target	12	1
Passes	812	205
Fouls committed	6	2
Corner kicks	10	0

=== India vs Chinese Taipei ===
10 March 2026
20:00 UTC+11

India	1–3	Chinese Taipei
Kalyan 39'	Report (AFC); Report (FIFA)	Su Yu-hsuan 12'; Elangbam 45+8' (o.g.); Chen Yu-chin 77'

Western Sydney Stadium, Sydney
Attendance: 3,648
Referee: Casey Reibelt (Australia)

GK	1	Panthoi Chanu Elangbam		(substituted off) 83'
DF	2	Sweety Devi Ngangbam (c)		(substituted off) 83'
DF	8	Sanju Yadav		(substituted off) 83'
DF	14	Nirmala Devi Phanjoubam
DF	15	Martina Thokchom
MF	4	Shilky Devi Hemam		(substituted off) 63'
MF	6	Sangita Basfore
MF	7	Soumya Guguloth		(substituted off) 46'
MF	10	Pyari Xaxa	(substituted off) 85'
FW	16	Manisha Kalyan	(yellow card) 90+6'
FW	20	Sanfida Nongrum
Substitutions:
FW	17	Rimpa Haldar		(substituted on) 46'
FW	12	Lynda Kom		(substituted on) 63'
DF	5	Juli Kishan		(substituted on) 83'
GK	23	Shreya Hooda		(substituted on) 83'
FW	26	Kaviya Pakkirisamy		(substituted on) 83'
Manager:
(Costa Rica) Amelia Valverde

GK	1	Wang Yu-ting		(substituted off) 60'
DF	2	Chang Chi-lan		(substituted off) 80'
DF	3	Su Sin-yun		(substituted off) 90+1'
DF	20	Chen Ying-hui (c)
DF	22	Huang Ke-sin	(yellow card) 37'
MF	9	Hsu Yi-yun
MF	10	Saki Matsunaga
MF	14	Wu Kai-Ching
MF	17	Chen Jin-wen	(yellow card) 88'	(substituted off) 90+1'
MF	21	Chen Yu-chin	(yellow card) 89'
FW	19	Su Yu-hsuan		(substituted off) 80'
Substitutions:
GK	23	Cheng Ssu-yu		(substituted on) 60'
DF	6	Teng Pei-lin		(substituted on) 80'
DF	8	Li Yi-wen		(substituted on) 80'
FW	4	Lin Yu-syuan	(yellow card) 90+4'	(substituted on) 90+1'
FW	7	Ting Chi		(substituted on) 90+1'
Manager:
(Thailand) Prasobchoke Chokemor

Player of the Match:
(Chinese Taipei) Wu Kai-Ching

Assistant referees:
Emma Kocbek (Australia)
Madelaine Allum (Australia)
Fourth official:
Supiree Testhomya (Thailand)
Video assistant referee:
Kate Jacewicz (Australia)
Assistant video assistant referee:
Sivakorn Pu-udom (Thailand)

Statistics	India	Chinese Taipei
Possession	39.0%	61.0%
Shots	16	17
Shots on target	3	6
Passes	270	449
Fouls committed	7	5
Corner kicks	5	4

== Discipline ==
Disciplinary points would have been used as a tiebreaker in the group if teams were tied on overall and head-to-head records, with a lower number of disciplinary points ranking higher. Points were calculated based on yellow and red cards received by players and coaches in all group matches as follows:

- first yellow card: –1 point;
- indirect red card (second yellow card): –3 points;
- direct red card: –3 points;
- yellow card and direct red card: –4 points.

Team	Match 1				Match 2				Match 3				Points
Team	Booked	(yellow card) (yellow-red card)	Sent off (straight red)	(yellow card) (red card)	Booked	(yellow card) (yellow-red card)	Sent off (straight red)	(yellow card) (red card)	Booked	(yellow card) (yellow-red card)	Sent off (straight red)	(yellow card) (red card)	Points
Japan													0
Vietnam	–1				–1								–2
India	–3				–1				–1				–5
Chinese Taipei	–1								–4				–5
