= Football at the 2025 SEA Games – Women's tournament =

2025 Women's SEA Games Football Tournament

Tournament details
- Host country: Thailand
- Dates: 4–17 December
- Teams: 7 (from 7 associations)
- Venues: 2 (in 1 host city)

Final positions
- Champions: Philippines (1st title)
- Runners-up: Vietnam
- Third place: Thailand
- Fourth place: Indonesia

Tournament statistics
- Matches played: 13
- Goals scored: 45 (3.46 per match)
- Top scorer(s): (Thailand) Jiraporn Mongkoldee (Vietnam) Nguyễn Thị Bích Thùy (Vietnam) Phạm Hải Yến (4 goals each)

The women's football tournament at the 2025 SEA Games (Thai: การแข่งขันฟุตบอลหญิงซีเกมส์ 2568) was held from 4 to 17 December 2025. It was the fourteenth edition of the women's SEA Games football tournament.

Vietnam are the four-time defending champions, having won the last four editions, but failed to secured their fifth title to Philippines, their first ever gold medal. And with Thailand, this is the first time ever they failed to achieved gold medal in their home soil.

== Schedule ==
The schedule will be as follows.

G	Group stage	½	Semi-finals	B	Bronze medal match	F	Gold medal match

Thu 4	Fri 5	Sat 6	Sun 7	Mon 8	Tue 9	Wed 10	Thu 11	Fri 12	Sat 13	Sun 14	Mon 15	Tue 16	Wed 17	
GS	GS		GS	GS		GS	GS			SF			B	F

== Venues ==
Chonburi		Football at the 2025 SEA Games – Women's tournament is located in Thailand
IPE Chonburi Stadium	Chonburi Stadium	Football at the 2025 SEA Games – Women's tournament is located in Thailand
Capacity: 11,000	Capacity: 8,680	Football at the 2025 SEA Games – Women's tournament is located in Thailand

== Squads ==
The women's tournament will be a full sub-confederational tournament with no restrictions on age. Each team had to submit a squad of 23 players, two of whom had to be goalkeepers. Each team could also name a list of four alternate players, who could replace any player in the squad in case of injury during the tournament.

== Draw ==
The draw for the tournament was held on 19 October 2025, 13:15 ICT (UTC+7), at the Devalux Resort & Spa in Bangkok, Thailand.

The 8 teams were drawn into two groups of four teams. The hosts Thailand were automatically seeded into Pot 1 and assigned to position A1 while the remaining teams were seeded into their respective pots based on their previous results.

Cambodia originally were drawn to Group A but withdrew citing safety reasons raised by Cambodian officials.

Pot 1	Pot 2	Pot 3	Pot 4
Thailand (H); Vietnam	Myanmar; ~~Cambodia~~ (W)	Philippines; Singapore	Malaysia; Indonesia

== Group stage ==
The competing countries will be divided into two groups of four teams, denoted as groups A and B. Teams in each group played one another in a round-robin basis, with the top two teams of each group advancing to the semi-finals.

All times are local, ICT (UTC+7).

=== Tiebreakers ===
The ranking of teams in the group stage was determined as follows:

1. Points obtained in all group matches (three points for a win, one for a draw, none for a defeat);
2. Goal difference in all group matches;
3. Number of goals scored in all group matches;
4. Points obtained in the matches played between the teams in question;
5. Goal difference in the matches played between the teams in question;
6. Number of goals scored in the matches played between the teams in question;
7. Fair play points in all group matches (only one deduction could be applied to a player in a single match):
  - Yellow card: −1 point;
  - Indirect red card (second yellow card): −3 points;
  - Direct red card: −4 points;
  - Yellow card and direct red card: −5 points;
8. Drawing of lots.

=== Group A ===
Pos	Team	Pld	W	D	L	GF	GA	GD	Pts	Qualification
1	Thailand (H)	2	2	0	0	10	0	+10	6	Advance to knockout stage
2	Indonesia	2	1	0	1	3	9	−6	3	Advance to knockout stage
3	Singapore	2	0	0	2	1	5	−4	0	
4	Cambodia	0	0	0	0	0	0	0	0	Withdrew

Source: Soccerway
(H) Hosts
4 December 2025
18:30

Thailand	8–0	Indonesia
Yumanda 8' (o.g.); Pattaranan 21'; Silawan 27'; Saowalak 44'; Jiraporn 50' (pen.), 52' (pen.), 60'; Panitha 55'	Report

Chonburi Stadium, Chonburi
Referee: Azusa Sugino (Japan)

7 December 2025
16:00

Singapore	1–3	Indonesia
Ruhaizat 22'	Report	Warps 31'; Scheunemann 62'; Aulia 90+5'

IPE Chonburi Stadium, Chonburi
Referee: Esra'a Almbaidin (Jordan)

10 December 2025
18:30

Thailand	2–0	Singapore
Kanyanat 9'; Orapin 18'	Report

Chonburi Stadium, Chonburi
Referee: Rebecca Durcau (Australia)

=== Group B ===
Pos	Team	Pld	W	D	L	GF	GA	GD	Pts	Qualification
1	Vietnam	3	2	0	1	9	1	+8	6	Advance to knockout stage
2	Philippines	3	2	0	1	8	2	+6	6	Advance to knockout stage
3	Myanmar	3	2	0	1	5	3	+2	6	
4	Malaysia	3	0	0	3	0	16	−16	0	

Source: Soccerway
5 December 2025
16:00

Myanmar	2–1	Philippines
Win Theingi Tun 4'; May Htet Lu 89'	Report	Ramirez 69'

IPE Chonburi Stadium, Chonburi
Referee: Sunita Thongthawin (Thailand)
5 December 2025
18:30

Vietnam	7–0	Malaysia
Phạm Hải Yến 4', 26'; Nguyễn Thị Bích Thùy 23'; Trần Thị Hải Linh 36'; Thái Thị Thảo 48', 59', 78'	Report

Chonburi Stadium, Chonburi
Referee: Rawdha Almansoori (United Arab Emirates)

8 December 2025
16:00

Malaysia	0–3	Myanmar
	Report	San Thaw Thaw 25'; May Htet Lu 35'; Win Theingi Tun 64'

IPE Chonburi Stadium, Chonburi
Referee: Alesar Baddour (Syria)
8 December 2025
18:30

Philippines	1–0	Vietnam
Ramirez 90+4'	Report

Chonburi Stadium, Chonburi
Referee: Gulshoda Saidqulova (Uzbekistan)

11 December 2025
16:00

Philippines	6–0	Malaysia
Pino 45', 53', 70' (pen.); Cowart 68'; Markey 85'; Castañeda 90+6'	Report

IPE Chonburi Stadium, Chonburi
Referee: Sunita Thongthawin (Thailand)
11 December 2025
16:00

Vietnam	2–0	Myanmar
Ngân Thị Vạn Sự 8'; Nguyễn Thị Bích Thùy 14'	Report

Chonburi Stadium, Chonburi
Referee: Esra'a Almbaidin (Jordan)

== Knockout stage ==
In the knockout stage, if a match was level at the end of normal playing time, extra time was played (two periods of 15 minutes each) and followed, if necessary, by a penalty shoot-out to determine the winner.

=== Bracket ===
Semi-finals
14 December – Chonburi
Thailand	1 (2)
Philippines (p)	1 (4)
14 December – Chonburi
Vietnam	5
Indonesia	0

Gold medal match
17 December – Chonburi
Philippines (p)	0 (6)
Vietnam	0 (5)
Bronze medal match
17 December – Chonburi
Thailand	2
Indonesia	0

=== Semi-finals ===
14 December 2025
16:00

Vietnam	5–0	Indonesia
Nguyễn Thị Bích Thùy 28' (pen.), 80'; Phạm Hải Yến 49', 58'; Huỳnh Như 86'	Report

IPE Chonburi Stadium, Chonburi
Referee: Alesar Baddour (Syria)

14 December 2025
18:30

Thailand	1–1 (a.e.t.)	Philippines
Jiraporn 53'	Report	Guy 87' (pen.)
Penalties
Jiraporn (penalty scored); Taneekarn (penalty scored); Pluemjai (penalty missed); Orapin (penalty missed)	2–4	(penalty scored) Guy; (penalty scored) Carpio; (penalty scored) Eggesvik; (penalty scored) Long

Chonburi Stadium, Chonburi
Referee: Esra'a Almbaidin (Jordan)

=== Bronze medal match ===
17 December 2025
15:30

Thailand	2–0	Indonesia
Pitsamai 17'; Pattaranan 43'	Report

Chonburi Stadium, Chonburi
Referee: Gulshoda Saitkulova (Uzbekistan)

=== Gold medal match ===
17 December 2025
19:30

Philippines	0–0 (a.e.t.)	Vietnam
	Report
Penalties
Guy (penalty scored); Pino (penalty scored); Long (penalty scored); Beard (penalty scored); Markey (penalty scored); Sawicki (penalty scored)	6–5	(penalty scored) Huỳnh Như; (penalty scored) Ngọc Minh Chuyên; (penalty scored) Nguyễn Thị Trúc Hương; (penalty scored) Hoàng Thị Loan; (penalty scored) Cù Thị Huỳnh Như; (penalty missed) Trần Thị Thu

Chonburi Stadium, Chonburi
Referee: Rebecca Durcau (Australia)

== Statistics ==
=== Goalscorers ===
There were 45 goals scored in 13 matches, for an average of 3.46 goals per match.

4 goals

- (Thailand) Jiraporn Mongkoldee
- (Vietnam) Nguyễn Thị Bích Thùy
- (Vietnam) Phạm Hải Yến

3 goals

- (Philippines) Alexa Pino
- (Vietnam) Thái Thị Thảo

2 goals

- (Myanmar) May Htet Lu
- (Myanmar) Win Theingi Tun
- (Philippines) Mallie Ramirez
- (Thailand) Pattaranan Aupachai

1 goal

- (Indonesia) Aulia Mabruroh
- (Indonesia) Claudia Scheunemann
- (Indonesia) Isa Warps
- (Myanmar) San Thaw Thaw
- (Philippines) Anicka Castañeda
- (Philippines) Jessika Cowart
- (Philippines) Jael-Marie Guy
- (Philippines) Ariana Markey
- (Singapore) Farhanah Binte Ruhaizat
- (Thailand) Kanyanat Chetthabutr
- (Thailand) Orapin Waenngoen
- (Thailand) Panitha Jiratanaphibun
- (Thailand) Pitsamai Sornsai
- (Thailand) Saowalak Pengngam
- (Thailand) Silawan Intamee
- (Vietnam) Huỳnh Như
- (Vietnam) Ngân Thị Vạn Sự
- (Vietnam) Trần Thị Hải Linh

1 own goal

- (Indonesia) Gea Yumanda (against Thailand)

== Final ranking ==
As per statistical convention in football, matches decided in extra time are counted as wins and losses, while matches decided by penalty shoot-outs are counted as draws.

Pos	Team	Pld	W	D	L	GF	GA	GD	Pts	Final result
1	Philippines	5	2	2	1	9	3	+6	8	Gold medal
2	Vietnam	5	3	1	1	14	1	+13	10	Silver medal
3	Thailand	4	3	1	0	13	1	+12	10	Bronze medal
4	Indonesia	4	1	0	3	3	16	−13	3	Fourth place
5	Myanmar	3	2	0	1	5	3	+2	6	Eliminated in group stage
6	Singapore	2	0	0	2	1	5	−4	0	Eliminated in group stage
7	Malaysia	3	0	0	3	0	16	−16	0	Eliminated in group stage

Source: SEA Games

== Controversy ==
In the final between Vietnam and the Philippines on 17 December, a controversial incident occurred in the 29th minute when Nguyễn Thị Bích Thùy headed the ball into the Philippines' net from a cross by Ngân Thị Vạn Sự. The assistant referee ruled Bích Thùy offside, and the referee disallowed the goal. However, television replays showed that Bích Thùy was still onside relative to the Philippines' defensive line at the moment the ball was played and was not in an offside position. The refereeing decision prompted strong reactions, particularly among the Vietnamese public, amid the absence of the video assistant referee (VAR) system at the tournament. Some commentators argued that the incident indirectly had a significant impact on the final outcome, as Vietnam lost 5–6 in the penalty shoot-out after more than 120 minutes of play.

== See also ==
- Football at the 2025 SEA Games – Men's tournament
