= Football at the 2025 SEA Games – Women's tournament – Group A =

Group A of the women's football tournament at the 2025 SEA Games was played from 4 to 10 December 2025. The group, one of two 3-team groups competing in the group stage of the SEA Games tournament, consisted of hosts Thailand, Singapore and Indonesia.

== Teams ==
Draw position	Team	SEA Games appearance	Last appearance	Previous best performance
A1	Thailand	14th	2023	Gold medalists (1985, 1995, 1997, 2007, 2013)
A3	Singapore	7th	2023	Silver medalist (1985)
A4	Indonesia	5th	2019	Fourth place (1997, 2001)

== Standings ==
Pos	Team	Pld	W	D	L	GF	GA	GD	Pts	Qualification
1	Thailand (H)	2	2	0	0	10	0	+10	6	Advance to knockout stage
2	Indonesia	2	1	0	1	3	9	−6	3	Advance to knockout stage
3	Singapore	2	0	0	2	1	5	−4	0	
4	Cambodia	0	0	0	0	0	0	0	0	Withdrew

Source: Soccerway
Rules for classification: Group stage tiebreakers
(H) Hosts

== Matches ==
=== Thailand vs Indonesia ===
4 December 2025
18:30

Thailand	8–0	Indonesia
Yumanda 8' (o.g.); Pattaranan 21'; Silawan 27'; Saowalak 44'; Jiraporn 50' (pen.), 52' (pen.), 60'; Panitha 55'	Report

Chonburi Stadium, Chonburi
Referee: Azusa Sugino (Japan)

Thailand	Indonesia

Manager: Nuengrutai Srathongvian	Manager: (Japan) Akira Higashiyama

Assistant referees:
Chantavong Phutsavan (Laos)
Dilshoda Rahmonova (Tajikistan)
Fourth official:
Esra'a Mahmoud Mohammad Almbaidin (Jordan)

=== Singapore vs Indonesia ===
7 December 2025
16:00

Singapore	1–3	Indonesia
Ruhaizat 22'	Report	Warps 31'; Scheunemann 62'; Aulia 90+5'

IPE Chonburi Stadium, Chonburi
Referee: Esra'a Almbaidin (Jordan)

Singapore	Indonesia

Manager: (Morocco) Karim Bencherifa	Manager: (Japan) Akira Higashiyama

Assistant referees:
Wu Qiaoli (China)
Salma Akter Mone (Bangladesh)
Fourth official:
Rebecca Anne Durcau (Australia)

=== Thailand vs Singapore ===
10 December 2025
18:30

Thailand	2–0	Singapore
Kanyanat 9'; Orapin 18'	Report

Chonburi Stadium, Chonburi
Referee: Rebecca Durcau (Australia)

Thailand	Singapore

Manager: Nuengrutai Srathongvian	Manager: (Morocco) Karim Bencherifa

Assistant referees:
Wu Qiaoli (China)
Dilshoda Rahmonova (Tajikistan)
Fourth official:
Esra'a Mahmoud Mohammad Almbaidin (Jordan)
