= 2024 AFC U-17 Women's Asian Cup =

Piala Asia Putri U-17 2024

Tournament details
- Host country: Indonesia
- City: Gianyar Regency
- Dates: 6–19 May
- Teams: 8 (from 1 confederation)
- Venues: 2 (in 1 host city)

Final positions
- Champions: North Korea (4th title)
- Runners-up: Japan
- Third place: South Korea
- Fourth place: China

Tournament statistics
- Matches played: 16
- Goals scored: 74 (4.63 per match)
- Attendance: 10,206 (638 per match)
- Top scorer(s): (North Korea) Jon Il-chong (6 goals)
- Best player: (Japan) Miharu Shinjo
- Best goalkeeper: (North Korea) Pak Ju-gyong
- Fair play award: Japan

The 2024 AFC U-17 Women's Asian Cup was the 9th edition of the AFC U-17 Women's Asian Cup (including previous editions of the AFC U-17 Women's Championship and AFC U-16 Women's Championship), the biennial international youth football championship organised by the Asian Football Confederation (AFC) for the women's under-17 national teams of Asia.

It was held in Indonesia between 6–19 May 2024. A total of eight teams competed in the tournament. This was the first continental women's football tournament hosted by Indonesia.

The top three teams of the tournament qualified for the 2024 FIFA U-17 Women's World Cup in the Dominican Republic as the AFC representatives. Japan were the defending champions. They were defeated in the final by North Korea, equaling Japan's record of four titles.

== Qualification ==
The host country and the top three teams of the previous tournament in 2019 qualified automatically, while the other four teams were decided by qualification. There were two rounds of qualification matches, with the first round played between 22–30 April 2023, and the second round played between 16–24 September 2023.

=== Qualified teams ===
The following teams qualified for the tournament.

| Team | Qualified as | Appearance | Previous best performance |
|---|---|---|---|
| Indonesia | Hosts | 2nd | Group stage (2005) |
| Japan | 2019 champions | 9th | Champions (2005, 2011, 2013, 2019) |
| North Korea | 2019 runners-up | 8th | Champions (2007, 2015, 2017) |
| China | 2019 third place | 9th | Runners-up (2005) |
| South Korea | Second round Group A winners | 9th | Champions (2009) |
| Thailand | Second round Group A runners-up | 9th | Third place (2005) |
| Australia | Second round Group B winners | 7th | Fourth place (2009, 2019) |
| Philippines | Second round Group B runners-up | 1st | Debut |

== Venues ==
The matches were played at two venues, both at Gianyar Regency in Bali.

Gianyar
| Kapten I Wayan Dipta Stadium | Bali United Training Center |
| Capacity: 18,000 | Capacity: 600 |
2024 AFC U-17 Women's Asian Cup is located in Bali

== Draw ==
The draw was held on 7 March 2024 at the AFC House in Kuala Lumpur, Malaysia. The eight teams were drawn into two groups of four teams. The teams were seeded according to their performance in the 2019 AFC U-16 Women's Championship final tournament and qualification, with the hosts Indonesia automatically seeded and assigned to Position A1 in the draw.

| Pot 1 | Pot 2 | Pot 3 | Pot 4 |
|---|---|---|---|
| 1. Indonesia (hosts); 2. Japan | 3. North Korea; 4. China | 5. Australia; 6. South Korea | 7. Thailand; 8. Philippines |

== Match officials ==
The following referees and assistant referees were appointed for the tournament.

Referees

- (Australia) Rebecca Durcau
- (China) Yu Hong
- (Chinese Taipei) Yang Shu-Ting
- (Iran) Mahsa Ghorbani
- (Japan) Azusa Sugino
- (South Korea) Cha Min-ji
- (Kyrgyzstan) Veronika Bernatskaia
- (Lebanon) Doumouh Al Bakkar
- (Thailand) Supiree Testhomya
- (Vietnam) Bùi Thị Thu Trang

Assistant referees

- (China) Bao Mengxiao
- (China) Wu Qiaoli
- (India) Riiohlang Dhar
- (Japan) Saki Nakamoto
- (Jordan) Islam Al-Abadi
- (Jordan) Sabreen Ala'badi
- (South Korea) Park Mi-suk
- (Laos) Phutsavan Chanthavong
- (Myanmar) Phyu May Thet
- (Tajikistan) Dilshoda Rahmanova
- (Thailand) Suwida Wongkraisorn
- (United Arab Emirates) Amal Badhafari

== Squads ==
Players born between 1 January 2007 and 31 December 2009 were eligible to compete in the tournament. Each team must register a squad of minimum 18 players and maximum 23 players, minimum three of whom must be goalkeepers (Regulations Articles 22.1 and 26.3).

== Group stage ==
The top two teams of each group advanced to the semi-finals.

Tiebreakers

Teams were ranked according to points (3 points for a win, 1 point for a draw, 0 points for a loss), and should they tied on points, the following tiebreaking criteria were applied, in the order given, to determine the rankings (Regulations Article 7.3):

1. Points in head-to-head matches among tied teams;
2. Goal difference in head-to-head matches among tied teams;
3. Goals scored in head-to-head matches among tied teams;
4. Should more than two teams were tied, and after applying all head-to-head criteria above, a subset of teams were still tied, all head-to-head criteria above were reapplied exclusively to this subset of teams;
5. Goal difference in all group matches;
6. Goals scored in all group matches;
7. Penalty shoot-out if only two teams are tied and they meet in the last round of the group;
8. Disciplinary points (yellow card = 1 point, red card as a result of two yellow cards = 3 points, direct red card = 3 points, yellow card followed by direct red card = 4 points);
9. Drawing of lots.

All times are local, WITA (UTC+8)

=== Group A ===
| Pos | Team | Pld | W | D | L | GF | GA | GD | Pts | Qualification |
|---|---|---|---|---|---|---|---|---|---|---|
| 1 | North Korea | 3 | 3 | 0 | 0 | 22 | 0 | +22 | 9 | Knockout stage |
| 2 | South Korea | 3 | 1 | 1 | 1 | 13 | 8 | +5 | 4 | Knockout stage |
| 3 | Philippines | 3 | 1 | 1 | 1 | 7 | 8 | −1 | 4 | |
| 4 | Indonesia (H) | 3 | 0 | 0 | 3 | 1 | 27 | −26 | 0 | |

Source: AFC
Rules for classification: Group stage tiebreakers
(H) Hosts
6 May 2024
16:00

| North Korea | 7–0 | South Korea |
|---|---|---|
| Ri Kuk-hyang 41' (pen.); Ho Kyong 45+2', 54'; Jon Il-chong 47', 51', 89'; Choe Rim-jong 60' | Report |

Bali United Training Center, Gianyar
Attendance: 25
Referee: Yu Hong (China)
6 May 2024
19:00

| Indonesia | 1–6 | Philippines |
|---|---|---|
| Scheunemann 12' | Report | Pino 6', 35'; Guy 22'; Markey 29'; Collins 54', 62' |

Kapten I Wayan Dipta Stadium, Gianyar
Attendance: 2,543
Referee: Supiree Testhomya (Thailand)

9 May 2024
16:00

| Philippines | 0–6 | North Korea |
|---|---|---|
| | Report | Jon Il-chong 17', 27'; Kang Ryu-mi 24'; Pak Il-sim 31'; Choe Chong-gum 48'; Son Jo-ye 90+3' |

Bali United Training Center, Gianyar
Attendance: 86
Referee: Azusa Sugino (Japan)
9 May 2024
19:00

| South Korea | 12–0 | Indonesia |
|---|---|---|
| Kim Hyo-won 13'; Han Guk-hee 34'; Beom Ye-ju 39'; Park Ji-yu 41'; Won Ju-eun 45+1', 50', 61', 86'; Kim Yee-un 59' (pen.); Baek Ji-eun 80', 82'; Seo Min-jeong 90+2' | Report |

Kapten I Wayan Dipta Stadium, Gianyar
Attendance: 966
Referee: Rebecca Durcau (Australia)

12 May 2024
16:00

| Indonesia | 0–9 | North Korea |
|---|---|---|
| | Report | Choe Il-son 1', 10', 38', 40', 47'; Kang Ryu-mi 11', 45+3'; Ro Un-hyang 14', 44' |

Kapten I Wayan Dipta Stadium, Gianyar
Attendance: 804
Referee: Mahsa Ghorbani (Iran)
12 May 2024
16:00

| South Korea | 1–1 | Philippines |
|---|---|---|
| Beom Ye-ju 74' | Report | Markey 38' |

Bali United Training Center, Gianyar
Attendance: 99
Referee: Veronika Bernatskaia (Kyrgyzstan)

=== Group B ===
| Pos | Team | Pld | W | D | L | GF | GA | GD | Pts | Qualification |
|---|---|---|---|---|---|---|---|---|---|---|
| 1 | Japan | 3 | 3 | 0 | 0 | 12 | 1 | +11 | 9 | Knockout stage |
| 2 | China | 3 | 2 | 0 | 1 | 6 | 4 | +2 | 6 | Knockout stage |
| 3 | Thailand | 3 | 1 | 0 | 2 | 3 | 8 | −5 | 3 | |
| 4 | Australia | 3 | 0 | 0 | 3 | 2 | 10 | −8 | 0 | |

Source: AFC
Rules for classification: Group stage tiebreakers
7 May 2024
16:00

| China | 3–0 | Australia |
|---|---|---|
| Zhou Xinyi 5'; Xiao Jiaqi 63'; Zhang Kecan 77' | Report |

Bali United Training Center, Gianyar
Attendance: 118
Referee: Veronika Bernatskaia (Kyrgyzstan)
7 May 2024
19:00

| Japan | 4–0 | Thailand |
|---|---|---|
| Shinjo 51'; Sakaki 65'; Tsuda 69', 87' | Report |

Kapten I Wayan Dipta Stadium, Gianyar
Attendance: 1,142
Referee: Mahsa Ghorbani (Iran)

10 May 2024
16:00

| Thailand | 0–3 | China |
|---|---|---|
| | Report | Song Yu 58'; Zhang Kecan 90'; Chen Rui 90+2' |

Bali United Training Center, Gianyar
Attendance: 89
Referee: Doumouh Al Bakkar (Lebanon)
10 May 2024
19:00

| Australia | 1–4 | Japan |
|---|---|---|
| Dos Santos 90+6' (pen.) | Report | Sato 3', 10'; Shinjo 65'; Hirakawa 80' |

Kapten I Wayan Dipta Stadium, Gianyar
Attendance: 862
Referee: Yang Shu-ting (Chinese Taipei)

13 May 2024
16:00

| Japan | 4–0 | China |
|---|---|---|
| Fukushima 9'; Kikuchi 74', 86'; Nezu 90+5' | Report |

Kapten I Wayan Dipta Stadium, Gianyar
Attendance: 737
Referee: Cha Min-ji (South Korea)
13 May 2024
16:00

| Australia | 1–3 | Thailand |
|---|---|---|
| Punch 31' | Report | Kurisara 38'; Rinyaphat 67'; Chutikan 90+7' |

Bali United Training Center, Gianyar
Attendance: 83
Referee: Bùi Thị Thu Trang (Vietnam)

== Knockout stage ==
Semi-finals
16 May
North Korea | 1
China | 0
16 May
Japan | 3
South Korea | 0

Final
19 May
North Korea | 1
Japan | 0
Third place match
19 May
China | 1
South Korea | 2

=== Semi-finals ===
The winners qualified for the 2024 FIFA U-17 Women's World Cup.

16 May 2024
15:00

| Japan | 3–0 | South Korea |
|---|---|---|
| Nezu 40'; Shinjo 68', 88' | Report |

Kapten I Wayan Dipta Stadium, Gianyar
Attendance: 427
Referee: Rebecca Durcau (Australia)
16 May 2024
19:00

| North Korea | 1–0 | China |
|---|---|---|
| Choe Yon-a 11' | Report |

Kapten I Wayan Dipta Stadium, Gianyar
Attendance: 716
Referee: Veronika Bernatskaia (Kyrgyzstan)

=== Third place match ===
The winner of this match qualified for the 2024 FIFA U-17 Women's World Cup.

19 May 2024
15:00

| China | 1–2 | South Korea |
|---|---|---|
| Dong Yujie 81' | Report | Phair 13', 84' |

Kapten I Wayan Dipta Stadium, Gianyar
Attendance: 184
Referee: Azusa Sugino (Japan)

=== Final ===
19 May 2024
19:00

| North Korea | 1–0 | Japan |
|---|---|---|
| Jon Il-chong 46' | Report |

Kapten I Wayan Dipta Stadium, Gianyar
Attendance: 1,325
Referee: Veronika Bernatskaia (Kyrgyzstan)

2024 AFC U-17 Women's Asian Cup winners

North Korea
Fourth title

== Awards ==
The following awards were given at the conclusion of the tournament:

| Award | Recipient |
|---|---|
| Most Valuable Player | (Japan) Miharu Shinjo |
| Top Goalscorer | (North Korea) Jon Il-chong |
| Best Goalkeeper | (North Korea) Pak Ju-gyong |
| Future Star (fan favorites) | (Japan) Miharu Shinjo (South Korea) Casey Phair (China) Zhang Kecan (Philippines) Ariana Markey |

== Goalscorers ==
There were 74 goals scored in 16 matches, for an average of 4.62 goals per match.

6 goals

- (North Korea) Jon Il-chong

5 goals

- (North Korea) Choe Il-son

4 goals

- (Japan) Miharu Shinjo
- (South Korea) Won Ju-eun

3 goals

- (North Korea) Kang Ryu-mi

2 goals

- (China) Zhang Kecan
- (Japan) Hana Kikuchi
- (Japan) Ririka Nezu
- (Japan) Momo Sato
- (Japan) Anon Tsuda
- (North Korea) Ho Kyong
- (North Korea) Ro Un-hyang
- (Philippines) Natalie Collins
- (Philippines) Ariana Markey
- (Philippines) Alexa Pino
- (South Korea) Baek Ji-eun
- (South Korea) Beom Ye-ju
- (South Korea) Casey Phair

1 goal

- (Australia) Indiana dos Santos
- (Australia) Lily Punch
- (China) Chen Rui
- (China) Dong Yujie
- (China) Song Yu
- (China) Xiao Jiaqi
- (China) Zhou Xinyi
- (Indonesia) Claudia Scheunemann
- (Japan) Noa Fukushima
- (Japan) Hina Hirakawa
- (Japan) Manaka Sakaki
- (North Korea) Choe Chong-gum
- (North Korea) Choe Rim-jong
- (North Korea) Choe Yon-a
- (North Korea) Pak Il-sim
- (North Korea) Ri Kuk-hyang
- (North Korea) Son Jo-ye
- (Philippines) Jael-Marie Guy
- (South Korea) Han Guk-hee
- (South Korea) Kim Hyo-won
- (South Korea) Kim Yee-un
- (South Korea) Park Ji-yu
- (South Korea) Seo Min-jeong
- (Thailand) Chutikan Kitikhun
- (Thailand) Kurisara Limpawanich
- (Thailand) Rinyaphat Moondong

== Qualified teams for FIFA U-17 Women's World Cup ==
The following three teams from AFC qualified for the 2024 FIFA U-17 Women's World Cup in the Dominican Republic.

| Team | Qualified on | Previous appearances in FIFA U-17 Women's World Cup^{1} |
|---|---|---|
| Japan | 16 May 2024 | 7 (2008, 2010, 2012, **2014**, 2016, 2018, 2022) |
| North Korea | 16 May 2024 | 6 (**2008**, 2010, 2012, 2014, **2016**, 2018) |
| South Korea | 19 May 2024 | 3 (2008, **2010**, 2018) |

^{1} Bold indicates champions for that year. Italic indicates hosts for that year.

== See also ==
- 2024 AFC U-20 Women's Asian Cup
