= Jael-Marie Guy =

Filipino footballer (born 2007)

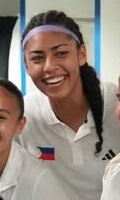
- Guy in 2025

Personal information
- Full name: Jael-Marie Miranda Guy
- Date of birth: August 15, 2007 (age 19)
- Place of birth: Landstuhl, Germany
- Height: 5 ft 9 in (1.74 m)
- Positions: Forward; midfielder

Team information
- Current team: Brown Bears
- Number: 15

Youth career
- World Class FC
- O'Neill High School

College career
Years	Team	Apps	(Gls)
2025–	Brown Bears	35	(7)

Senior career*
Years	Team	Apps	(Gls)
2025–	Hudson Valley Crusaders	15	(5)

International career^{‡}
2024	Philippines U17	3	(1)
2025–	Philippines	9	(1)
Medal record
Women's football
Representing the Philippines
Southeast Asian Games
Gold medal – first place	2025 Thailand	Team
- * Club domestic league appearances and goals as of May 16, 2026 ‡ National team caps and goals as of March 19, 2026

Jael-Marie Miranda Guy (born August 15, 2007) is a professional footballer who plays as a forward for the Brown Bears. Born in Germany, she represents the Philippines at international level.

== Early life ==
Guy attended James I. O'Neill High School in Highland Falls, New York, where she played for the Raiders varsity soccer team. She earned All-State honors as a junior and senior and was a three-time All-Section selection. In 2024, she was named Jimmy Ranieri Tournament Most Valuable Player and a First Team All-Star. She also played club soccer for World Class FC in the Elite Clubs National League (ECNL).

== College career ==
Guy began her collegiate career at Brown University in 2025. She made 16 appearances as a freshman, scoring three goals, including her first in a 2–0 win over Northeastern.

== Club career ==
In 2025, Guy joined the Hudson Valley Crusaders of the USL W League. She scored her first goal for the club in a 3–3 draw against Cedar Stars on June 14, 2025.

== International career ==
In January 2024, Guy was called up to the Philippines U-17 national team, where she attended a training camp with the Filipinas U17 in California, USA. In May 2024, she was selected as part of the Filipinas U17 squad for the 2024 AFC U-17 Women's Asian Cup in Bali, Indonesia. Guy made her international debut in a match against Indonesia U-17 where she scored a goal in the 22nd minute in which the Philippines won 6–1. She featured in all three group stage matches during the tournament.

Guy received her first senior call-up to the Philippines women's national team on November 19, 2025, for a training camp ahead of the 2025 SEA Games. She made her senior international debut on December 5, 2025, in a 2–1 loss to Myanmar. She scored her first senior international goal in the 87th minute of the semifinal against Thailand, equalizing the match at 1–1 in regulation time. Guy also converted the opening penalty in the subsequent 4–2 shootout victory, which sent the Philippines to the SEA Games final for the first time in history. On December 17, 2025, the Philippines won their first-ever gold medal at the SEA Games. Guy again scored the opening penalty in the 6–5 shootout win over Vietnam in the final.

At the 2026 AFC Women's Asian Cup, Guy was part of the Philippines squad that reached the quarterfinals before losing to eventual champions Japan. In the subsequent World Cup qualification play-in match against Uzbekistan, she provided assists for goals by Angela Beard and Jaclyn Sawicki in a 2–0 victory, helping the Philippines qualify for the 2027 FIFA Women's World Cup, and was named Player of the Match.

== Career statistics ==
=== Club ===
As of May 16, 2026

Appearances and goals by club, season and competition
Club	Season	League			National Cup		Total	
Club	Season	Division	Apps	Goals	Apps	Goals	Apps	Goals
Hudson Valley Crusaders	2025	USL W League	6	3	—		6	3
Hudson Valley Crusaders	2026	USL W League	7	2	—		7	2
Career total			15	5	0	0	15	5

=== International ===
As of match played March 19, 2026

Appearances and goals by national team and year
National team	Year	Apps	Goals
Philippines	2025	5	1
Philippines	2026	4	0
Total		9	1

Scores and results list Philippine's goal tally first, score column indicates score after each Guy goal.

List of international goals scored by Jael-Marie Guy
No.	Date	Venue	Opponent	Score	Result	Competition	Ref.
1.	December 14, 2025	Chonburi Stadium, Chonburi, Thailand	Thailand	1–1	1–1 (a.e.t.) (4–2 p)	2025 SEA Games	

== Honors ==
Philippines

- Southeast Asian Games: 2025
