= Mallie Ramirez =

Filipino footballer (born 2004)

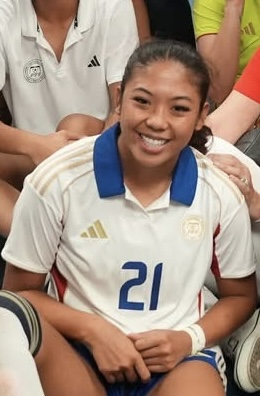
- Ramirez in 2025

Personal information
- Full name: Mary Louise Ramirez
- Date of birth: September 1, 2004 (age 22)
- Place of birth: Cebu, Philippines
- Height: 5 ft 4 in (1.63 m)
- Positions: Forward; midfielder

Team information
- Current team: Crvena zvezda
- Number: 24

Youth career
- Clovis Crossfire
- Clovis North Broncos

College career
Years	Team	Apps	(Gls)
2022–2025	UNLV Rebels	76	(14)

Senior career*
Years	Team	Apps	(Gls)
2026–	Crvena zvezda	7	(7)

International career^{‡}
2025–	Philippines	13	(3)
Medal record
Women's football
Representing the Philippines
Southeast Asian Games
Gold medal – first place	2025 Thailand	Team
- * Club domestic league appearances and goals as of November 15, 2026 ‡ National team caps and goals as of September 25, 2026

Mary Louise "Mallie" Ramirez (born September 1, 2004) is a Filipino professional footballer who plays as a forward for Serbian Women's Super League club Crvena zvezda and the Philippines national team.

== Early life ==
Ramirez was born in Cebu, Philippines, and grew up in Clovis, California. She attended Clovis North High School, where she lettered in soccer for two years. In her senior season in 2021–22, she helped the Broncos to a 20–4–1 record, scored 23 goals, and earned First Team All-TRAC honors. She also played club soccer for Clovis Crossfire for seven seasons, reaching the finals of multiple national tournaments.

== College career ==
Ramirez began her collegiate career at the University of Nevada, Las Vegas (UNLV) in 2022. As a freshman, she featured in 19 matches with three starts and tied for the team lead in goals with three, earning Academic All-Mountain West honors. In her sophomore season in 2023, she appeared in 19 matches and started 14, finishing as the Rebels’ second-leading scorer with five goals, including a brace against CSU Bakersfield and the equalizer in a comeback win over Wyoming.

In 2024, she started all 20 matches, scored five goals, and was again second on the team in scoring. In her senior season in 2025, she appeared in 18 matches, scoring one goal. She finished her college career with 76 appearances and 14 goals.

Following the conclusion of the 2025 collegiate season, she officially became a free agent.

== International career ==
Ramirez received her first call up to the Philippines national football team in February 2025 for a training camp in Manila. She made her international debut on December 5, 2025, scoring her first goal in a 2–1 loss to Myanmar at the 2025 SEA Games. Three days later, she scored the winning goal in a 1–0 victory over Vietnam.

== Career statistics ==
=== Club ===
As of November 15, 2026

Appearances and goals by club, season and competition
Club	Season	League			National Cup		Total	
Club	Season	Division	Apps	Goals	Apps	Goals	Apps	Goals
Crvena zvezda	2026–27	Serbian SuperLiga	7	7	—		7	7
Career total			7	7	0	0	7	7

=== International ===
As of match played September 25, 2026

Appearances and goals by national team and year
National team	Year	Apps	Goals
Philippines	2025	5	2
Philippines	2026	8	1
Total		13	3

Scores and results list Philippine's goal tally first, score column indicates score after each Ramirez goal.

List of international goals scored by Mallie Ramirez
No.	Date	Venue	Opponent	Score	Result	Competition	Ref.
1.	December 5, 2025	IPE Chonburi Stadium, Chonburi, Thailand	Myanmar	1–1	1–2	2025 SEA Games	
2.	December 8, 2025	Chonburi Stadium, Chonburi, Thailand	Vietnam	1–0	1–0	2025 SEA Games	
3.	September 17, 2026	Gifu Nagaragawa Stadium, Gifu, Japan	Hong Kong	2–0	2–0	2026 Asian Games	

== Honors ==
Philippines

- Southeast Asian Games: 2025
