= Megan Murray =

Megan Murray may refer to:

- Megan B. Murray, American epidemiologist
- Megan Murray (politician), American politician
