= Alexa Pino =

Filipino footballer (born 2007)

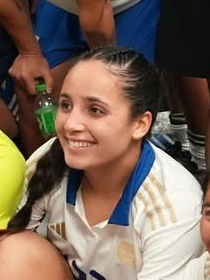
- Pino in 2025

Personal information
- Full name: Alexa Marie Troisi Pino
- Date of birth: March 1, 2007 (age 19)
- Place of birth: Norwalk, Connecticut, U.S.
- Height: 5 ft 5 in (1.65 m)
- Positions: Attacking midfielder; forward

Team information
- Current team: Kentucky Wildcats
- Number: 20

Youth career
- World Class FC
- St. Joseph Cadets

College career
Years	Team	Apps	(Gls)
2025	South Carolina Gamecocks	19	(0)
2026–	Kentucky Wildcats	16	(1)

International career^{‡}
2024	Philippines U17	4	(2)
2024–	Philippines	14	(5)
Medal record
Women's football
Representing the Philippines
Southeast Asian Games
Gold medal – first place	2025 Thailand	Team
- ‡ National team caps and goals as of March 19, 2026

Alexa Marie Troisi Pino (born March 1, 2007) is a footballer who plays as a midfielder or forward for the Kentucky Wildcats. Born in the United States, she represents the Philippines at international level.

== Early life ==
Pino attended St. Joseph High School in Trumbull, Connecticut, where she played for the Cadets varsity soccer team. As a freshman, Pino helped the Cadets win the CIAC Class L state championship 2–0 over Simsbury with a goal and an assist. During her sophomore year, Pino was named 2022–23 Gatorade Connecticut Girls Soccer Player of the Year after leading her team to their second straight Class L state championship. Pino scored 32 goals and passed for 17 assists, setting up a pair of goals in St. Joseph's 3–0 win over Notre Dame-Fairfield in the state final.

As a junior, Pino helped lead the Cadets to a 22–0–1 record along with a repeat FCIAC championship and a third straight state title when they defeated Notre Dame-Fairfield 3–1 in the Class LL final. She was subsequently named the GameTimeCT Player of the Year for the second consecutive season. In her senior year, she recorded 24 goals and 23 assists, leading St. Joseph to the Class LL state final, where they finished as runners-up. She was named GameTimeCT Player of the Year for the third time. Pino is also a three-time United Soccer Coaches All-American and a four-time First Team All-State honoree. She concluded her high school career with 123 goals and 82 assists. She also played club soccer for World Class FC and helped the team advance to the ECNL Finals in 2023.

== International career ==
In January 2024, Pino was called up to the Philippines U-17 team and made her debut for under-17 on February 5, 2024, in a friendly match against England U-17 at 2024 MIMA Cup in Spain. She also played the match as a team captain against Sweden U-17. In May 2024, Pino was selected as part of the Philippines U17 squad for the 2024 AFC U-17 Women's Asian Cup in Bali, Indonesia. During a game against Indonesia, she scored a brace which helped the Philippines win 6–1 in the group stage. She also played in a match against South Korea U-17 which ended in a 1–1 draw.

Just weeks after her youth debut, Pino earned her first senior cap on February 21, 2024, coming off the bench in a friendly match against Finland. In April 2024, she made another appearance for the senior national team in a friendly against South Korea.

Pino made her competitive senior debut for the Philippines at the 2026 AFC Women's Asian Cup qualifiers scoring her first international goal in a 3–0 win against Saudi Arabia on June 29, 2025, in their opening match, where she was named Player of the Match. She added another goal in a 6–0 victory against Cambodia on July 2. In the final group match against Hong Kong, she provided the assist for Chandler McDaniel's fourth-minute goal, helping the Philippines secure a 1–0 win and qualification for the 2026 AFC Women's Asian Cup.

In December 2025, Pino was selected as part of the Philippines squad for the 2025 SEA Games. She scored a hat trick in a 6–0 win against Malaysia, helping the Philippines advance to the semifinals. In the final, after a scoreless draw following extra time, she scored the second penalty in the shootout as the Philippines defeated Vietnam 6–5 to win their historic first-ever gold medal at the SEA Games.

== Career statistics ==
=== International ===
As of match played March 19, 2026

Appearances and goals by national team and year
National team	Year	Apps	Goals
Philippines	2024	2	0
Philippines	2025	8	5
Philippines	2026	4	0
Total		14	5

Scores and results list Philippine's goal tally first, score column indicates score after each Pino goal.

List of international goals scored by Alexa Pino
No.	Date	Venue	Opponent	Score	Result	Competition	Ref.
1.	June 29, 2025	Olympic Stadium, Phnom Penh, Cambodia	Saudi Arabia	3–0	3–0	2026 AFC Women's Asian Cup qualification	
2.	July 2, 2025	Olympic Stadium, Phnom Penh, Cambodia	Cambodia	1–0	6–0	2026 AFC Women's Asian Cup qualification	
3.	December 11, 2025	IPE Chonburi Stadium, Chonburi, Thailand	Malaysia	1–0	6–0	2025 SEA Games	
4.	December 11, 2025	IPE Chonburi Stadium, Chonburi, Thailand	Malaysia	2–0	6–0	2025 SEA Games	
5.	December 11, 2025	IPE Chonburi Stadium, Chonburi, Thailand	Malaysia	4–0	6–0	2025 SEA Games	

== Personal life ==
Pino is eligible to represent the Philippines through her father, who is of Filipino descent.

== Honors ==
Philippines

- Southeast Asian Games: 2025
