= Nguyễn Thị Bích Thùy =

Vietnamese footballer

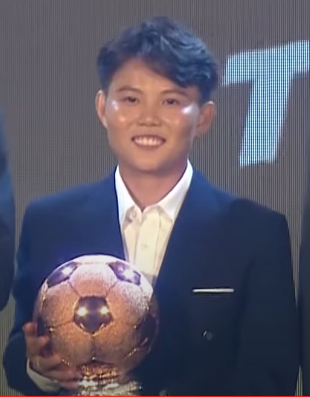
- Bích Thùy in 2022

Personal information
- Date of birth: 1 May 1994 (age 32)
- Place of birth: Nghĩa Hành, Quảng Ngãi, Vietnam
- Height: 1.53 m (5 ft 0 in)
- Position: Winger

Team information
- Current team: Thái Nguyên T&T
- Number: 7

Senior career*
Years	Team	Apps	(Gls)
2010–2024	Hồ Chí Minh City I	155	(41)
2024–	Thái Nguyên T&T		

International career^{‡}
2013–	Vietnam	87	(26)
- * Club domestic league appearances and goals ‡ National team caps and goals as of 14 December 2025

Nguyễn Thị Bích Thùy (born 1 May 1994) is a Vietnamese footballer who plays as a winger for Women's Championship club Thái Nguyên T&T and the Vietnam women's national team.

In March 2024, Bích Thùy departed from Hồ Chí Minh City I after 14 years at the club, joining Thái Nguyên T&T after signing a two-year contract deal.

== International Apps ==
As of match played 14 December 2025

Appearances and goals by national team and year
National Team	Year	Apps	Goals
Vietnam	2015	4	0
Vietnam	2016	11	0
Vietnam	2017	7	2
Vietnam	2018	2	5
Vietnam	2019	14	0
Vietnam	2020	2	0
Vietnam	2021	1	2
Vietnam	2022	13	1
Vietnam	2023	17	6
Vietnam	2024	2	0
Vietnam	2025	12	10
Total		86	24

== International goals ==
Scores and result are list Vietnam's goal tally first.

No.	Date	Venue	Opponent	Score	Result	Competition
1.	7 April 2017	Vietnam FYT Center Field no.3, Hanoi, Vietnam	Singapore	7–0	8–0	2018 AFC Women's Asian Cup qualification
2.	20 August 2017	UM Arena Stadium, Kuala Lumpur, Malaysia	Myanmar	2–1	3–1	2017 Southeast Asian Games
3.	16 August 2018	IPE Chonburi Stadium, Chonburi, Thailand	Cambodia	6–0	10–0	2019 AFF Women's Championship
4.	16 August 2018	IPE Chonburi Stadium, Chonburi, Thailand	Cambodia	7–0	10–0	2019 AFF Women's Championship
5.	16 August 2018	IPE Chonburi Stadium, Chonburi, Thailand	Cambodia	8–0	10–0	2019 AFF Women's Championship
6.	16 August 2018	IPE Chonburi Stadium, Chonburi, Thailand	Cambodia	9–0	10–0	2019 AFF Women's Championship
7.	18 August 2018	IPE Chonburi Stadium, Chonburi, Thailand	Indonesia	1–0	7–0	2019 AFF Women's Championship
8.	29 September 2021	Pamir Stadium, Dushanbe, Tajikistan	Tajikistan	2–0	7–0	2022 AFC Women's Asian Cup qualification
9.	29 September 2021	Pamir Stadium, Dushanbe, Tajikistan	Tajikistan	4–0	7–0	2022 AFC Women's Asian Cup qualification
10.	6 February 2022	DY Patil Stadium, Navi Mumbai, India	Chinese Taipei	2–1	2–1	2022 AFC Women's Asian Cup
11.	5 April 2023	Dasarath Rangasala, Kathmandu, Nepal	Nepal	3–0	5–1	2024 AFC Women's Olympic Qualifying Tournament
12.	3 May 2023	RCAF Old Stadium, Phnom Penh, Cambodia	Malaysia	2–0	3–0	2023 Southeast Asian Games
13.	9 May 2023	RSN Stadium, Phnom Penh, Cambodia	Philippines	1–1	1–2	2023 Southeast Asian Games
14.	22 September 2023	Wenzhou Olympic Sports Center Stadium, Wenzhou, China	Nepal	2–0	2–0	2022 Asian Games
15.	25 September 2023	Wenzhou Olympic Sports Center Stadium, Wenzhou, China	Bangladesh	4–0	6–1	2022 Asian Games
16.	25 September 2023	Wenzhou Olympic Sports Center Stadium, Wenzhou, China	Bangladesh	6–0	6–1	2022 Asian Games
17.	29 June 2025	Việt Trì Stadium, Việt Trì, Vietnam	Maldives	3–0	7–0	2026 AFC Women's Asian Cup qualification
18.	5 July 2025	Việt Trì Stadium, Việt Trì, Vietnam	Guam	2–0	4–0	2026 AFC Women's Asian Cup qualification
19.	5 July 2025	Việt Trì Stadium, Việt Trì, Vietnam	Guam	3–0	4–0	2026 AFC Women's Asian Cup qualification
20.	9 August 2025	Lạch Tray Stadium, Hải Phòng, Vietnam	Indonesia	1–0	7–0	2025 ASEAN Women's Championship
21.	19 August 2025	Lạch Tray Stadium, Hải Phòng, Vietnam	Thailand	3–0	3–1	2025 ASEAN Women's Championship
22.	5 December 2025	Chonburi Stadium, Chonburi, Thailand	Malaysia	2–0	7–0	2025 SEA Games
23.	11 December 2025	Chonburi Stadium, Chonburi, Thailand	Myanmar	2–0	2–0	2025 SEA Games
24.	14 December 2025	IPE Chonburi Stadium, Chonburi, Thailand	Indonesia	1–0	5–0	2025 SEA Games
25.	14 December 2025	IPE Chonburi Stadium, Chonburi, Thailand	Indonesia	4–0	5–0	2025 SEA Games
