= Ariana Markey =

Filipino footballer (born 2007)

Personal information
- Full name: Ariana Isabella Rodriguez Markey
- Date of birth: June 8, 2007 (age 19)
- Place of birth: Fullerton, California, U.S.
- Height: 5 ft 4 in (1.63 m)
- Positions: Defender; winger

Team information
- Current team: Pepperdine Waves
- Number: 7

Youth career
- Slammers FC
- Legends FC
- Troy Warriors
- Orange Lutheran Lancers

College career
| Years | Team | Apps | (Gls) |
| 2025– | Pepperdine Waves | 38 | (1) |

International career^{‡}
| 2023–2024 | Philippines U17 | 10 | (2) |
| 2023 | Philippines U20 | 3 | (0) |
| 2025– | Philippines | 8 | (1) |
Medal record
Women's football
Representing the Philippines
Southeast Asian Games
| Gold medal – first place | 2025 Thailand | Team |
- ‡ National team caps and goals as of March 19, 2026

Ariana Isabella Rodriguez Markey (born June 8, 2007) is a footballer who plays as a defender for the Pepperdine Waves. Born in the United States, she represents the Philippines at international level.

== Early life ==
Markey grew up in Fullerton, California. She attended Troy High School, where she played three seasons of varsity soccer and earned Rookie of the Year honors as a freshman. For her senior year, she transferred to Orange Lutheran High School, where she was named Offensive MVP and received All-Conference First Team recognition in 2025. She also played club soccer for Slammers FC and Legends FC in the Elite Clubs National League (ECNL). In 2021–22, she was named to the ECNL Southwest All-Conference First Team.

== College career ==
Markey began her collegiate career at Pepperdine University in 2025. As a freshman, she appeared in 20 matches, including six starts. She scored her first collegiate goal in a 9–0 win over Pacific and recorded her first assist against Hawaii. She helped the Waves win the West Coast Conference (WCC) title and was named to the All-WCC Freshman Team.

== International career ==
In March 2023, Markey was called up to the Philippines U-20 national team for the 2024 AFC U-20 Women's Asian Cup qualification in Vientiane, Laos. She made her debut on March 8, 2023, in a match against China U-20. She featured in all three matches of the qualifying round.

The following month, she joined the Philippine U-17 national team for the 2024 AFC U-17 Women's Asian Cup qualification. She appeared in wins over Guam U-17 and Lebanon U-17, helping the Philippines advance to the second round. In September 2023, she played in all three second-round matches in Hanoi, Vietnam, against Australia, Bangladesh and Vietnam, as the Philippines U-17 made history by qualifying for the AFC U-17 Women's Asian Cup for the first time.

In February 2024, Markey played in international friendlies at the 2024 MIMA Cup in Spain, featuring in matches against England U-17 and Sweden U-17. Two months later, she captained the team at the final tournament of the 2024 AFC U-17 Women's Asian Cup in Bali, Indonesia. She scored her first international goal in a 6–1 win over hosts Indonesia. On May 12, 2025, she scored an Olympico goal in their final group match against South Korea which ended in a 1–1 draw. The Philippines finished the group stage tied on points with South Korea but missed qualification for the 2024 FIFA U-17 Women's World Cup on goal difference.

In October 2024, Markey received her first call up to Philippines senior national team for friendlies against Jordan and Kenya at the 2024 Pink Ladies Cup in Antalya, Turkey. She made her senior international debut on December 11, 2025, scoring her first goal in a 6–0 win over Malaysia, helping the Philippines advance to the semifinals of the 2025 SEA Games. On December 17, 2025, she converted a penalty kick in the 6–5 shootout victory over Vietnam in the final, as the Philippines won their first SEA Games gold medal in history.

Markey was named to the Philippines squad for the 2026 AFC Women's Asian Cup. On March 8, 2026, during their match against Iran, she provided an assist for Chandler McDaniel in their 2–0 victory, as the Philippines remained in contention to advance to the knockout stage as one of the best third-placed teams. The team went on to advance to the quarterfinals before losing to eventual champions Japan. On March 19, 2026, during the subsequent World Cup qualifying play-in match against Uzbekistan, she came on as a substitute in a 2–0 win, as the Philippines qualified for the 2027 FIFA Women's World Cup.

== Career statistics ==
=== International ===
As of match played March 19, 2026

Appearances and goals by national team and year
| National team | Year | Apps | Goals |
|---|---|---|---|
| Philippines | 2025 | 3 | 1 |
| Philippines | 2026 | 5 | 0 |
| Total | | 8 | 1 |

Scores and results list Philippine's goal tally first, score column indicates score after each Markey goal.

List of international goals scored by Ariana Markey
| No. | Date | Venue | Opponent | Score | Result | Competition | Ref. |
|---|---|---|---|---|---|---|---|
| 1. | December 11, 2025 | IPE Chonburi Stadium, Chonburi, Thailand | Malaysia | 5–0 | 6–0 | 2025 SEA Games | |

== Honors ==
Philippines

- Southeast Asian Games: 2025
