= Ngân Thị Vạn Sự =

Vietnamese footballer

Personal information
- Date of birth: 29 April 2001 (age 25)
- Place of birth: Tương Dương, Nghệ An, Vietnam
- Height: 1.52 m (5 ft 0 in)
- Position: Forward

Team information
- Current team: Hà Nội I
- Number: 13

Senior career*
Years	Team	Apps	(Gls)
2017–	Hà Nội I	34	(6)

International career^{‡}
2018–2021	Vietnam U20	5	(1)
2019–	Vietnam	51	(14)
- * Club domestic league appearances and goals ‡ National team caps and goals as of 10 March 2026

Ngân Thị Vạn Sự (born 29 April 2001) is a Vietnamese association football player who plays as a forward for Women's Championship club Hà Nội I and the Vietnam women's national team.

== International career ==
=== International Apps ===
As of match played 4 March 2026

Appearances and goals by national team and year
National Team	Year	Apps	Goals
Vietnam	2020	3	1
Vietnam	2021	1	0
Vietnam	2022	16	4
Vietnam	2023	14	1
Vietnam	2024	2	0
Vietnam	2025	12	6
Vietnam	2026	2	2
Total		51	14

== International goals ==
Scores and results are list Vietnam's goal tally first.

No.	Cap.	Date	Venue	Opponent	Score	Result	Competition
1.	1.	6 February 2020	Jeju World Cup Stadium, Seogwipo, South Korea	Myanmar	1–0	1–0	2020 AFC Women's Olympic Qualifying Tournament
2.	11.	14 May 2022	Cẩm Phả Stadium, Cẩm Phả, Vietnam	Cambodia	6–0	7–0	2021 Southeast Asian Games
3.	15.	7 July 2022	Biñan Football Stadium, Biñan, Philippines	Cambodia	1–0	3–0	2022 AFF Women's Championship
4.	17.	11 July 2022	Biñan Football Stadium, Biñan, Philippines	Timor-Leste	2–0	6–0	2022 AFF Women's Championship
5.	17.	11 July 2022	Biñan Football Stadium, Biñan, Philippines	Timor-Leste	5–0	6–0	2022 AFF Women's Championship
6.	25.	12 May 2023	Olympic Stadium, Phnom Penh, Cambodia	Cambodia	1–0	4–0	2023 Southeast Asian Games
7.	38.	29 June 2025	Việt Trì Stadium, Việt Trì, Vietnam	Maldives	1–0	7–0	2026 AFC Women's Asian Cup qualification
8.	38.	29 June 2025	Việt Trì Stadium, Việt Trì, Vietnam	Maldives	2–0	7–0	2026 AFC Women's Asian Cup qualification
9.	39.	2 July 2025	Việt Trì Stadium, Việt Trì, Vietnam	United Arab Emirates	6–0	6–0	2026 AFC Women's Asian Cup qualification
10.	41.	6 August 2025	Lạch Tray Stadium, Haiphong, Vietnam	Cambodia	2–0	6–0	2025 ASEAN Women's Championship
11.	42.	9 August 2025	Lạch Tray Stadium, Haiphong, Vietnam	Indonesia	4–0	7–0	2025 ASEAN Women's Championship
12.	48.	11 December 2025	Chonburi Stadium, Chonburi, Thailand	Myanmar	1–0	2–0	2025 SEA Games
13.	51.	4 March 2026	Perth Rectangular Stadium, Perth, Australia	India	1–0	2–1	2026 AFC Women's Asian Cup
14.	51.	4 March 2026	Perth Rectangular Stadium, Perth, Australia	India	2–1	2–1	2026 AFC Women's Asian Cup
