= Jessika Cowart =

American-Filipino footballer (born 1999)

- Cowart in 2023

Personal information
- Full name: Jessika Rebecca Macayan Cowart
- Date of birth: October 30, 1999 (age 27)
- Place of birth: Fairfield, California, United States
- Height: 5 ft 8 in (1.73 m)
- Position: Defender

Youth career
- Palo Alto SC
- PSV Union SC

College career
Years	Team	Apps	(Gls)
2017–2021	Washington Huskies	66	(4)

Senior career*
Years	Team	Apps	(Gls)
2019	MVLA Wolves	2	(0)
2022	Çaykur Rizespor	10	(2)
2022	California Storm	4	(0)
2022–2023	Spartak Subotica	12	(1)
2023	IFK Kalmar	17	(0)
2023–2024	Perth Glory	22	(0)
2025–2026	Vancouver Rise	35	(0)

International career^{‡}
2022–	Philippines	50	(3)
Medal record
Women's football
Representing the Philippines
AFF Women's Championship
Winner	2022 Philippines	Team
Southeast Asian Games
Gold medal – first place	2025 Thailand	Team
- * Club domestic league appearances and goals as of Oct 27, 2026 ‡ National team caps and goals as of March 19, 2026

Jessika Rebecca Macayan Cowart (born October 30, 1999) is a professional footballer who plays as a defender. Born in the United States, she represents the Philippines at international level.

== Early life ==
Cowart had her youth career at Palo Alto Soccer Club and PSV Union. She also played for the varsity soccer team of Woodside High School in California.

== College career ==
Cowart played collegiate soccer at University of Washington. She received the 2019 Husky Invitational Tournament Defensive MVP Award playing as a defensive midfielder against the University of North Carolina, University of Portland, and University of New Mexico. She appeared in 66 matches with 51 starts, including the 2019 NCAA Division I Women's Soccer Tournament.

== Club career ==
=== MLVA Wolves ===
In 2019, Cowart played with the MVLA Wolves in the Women's Premier Soccer League.

=== Çaykur Rizespor ===
In 2022, Cowart joined Turkish Women's Football Super League club Çaykur Rizespor. She made her debut for the club in a 3–1 win against Adana İdman Yurdu. She finished the season with 10 starts in 10 matches for the club, scoring two goals and two assists.

=== California Storm ===
After her short stint in the Turkish top flight, Cowart joined Women's Premier Soccer League club California Storm, who later won the 2022 WPSL Championship.

=== Spartak Subotica ===
Cowart joined ŽFK Spartak Subotica of the Serbian Women's Super League in August 2022. She made her debut for the club against Norwegian side SK Brann Kvinner during the first round of the 2022 UEFA Women's Champions League She started in all 12 league games.

=== IFK Kalmar ===
In January 2023, Cowart signed with Damallsvenskan club IFK Kalmar. She started all 17 league games.

=== Perth Glory ===
A-League Women side, Perth Glory announced they have signed in Cowart on September 5, 2023. She made her A-League debut on October 14, 2023, with a 2–0 victory over Western United. She went on to start all 22 games, playing a total of 1966 minutes, completing 40 interceptions along with 99 clearances and ranking in the league's top ten for passes completed. Despite re-signing for the 2024–25 A-League Women season in August 2024, two months later the club announced her departure by mutual consent to pursue an opportunity in America.

=== Vancouver Rise ===
In February 2025, Cowart signed with Canadian Northern Super League side Vancouver Rise FC. She made her debut as a starter on April 16, 2025, with a 1–0 victory over Calgary Wild. She started 18 of her 19 regular season appearances, as well as both semi-final matches against Ottawa Rapid, and the 2025 Northern Super League Championship Game against AFC Toronto, which Rise won 2–1. Cowart was presented with the Rise Defensive MVP Award for the 2025 season.

== International career ==
Cowart is eligible to represent either United States or Philippines at the international level.

=== Philippines ===
In June 2022, Cowart was included in the Philippines squad for the national team's training camp in Europe. The training camp was part of the national team's preparation for the 2022 AFF Women's Championship, held in the Philippines.

Cowart made her debut for the Philippines in a 1–0 friendly loss against Republic of Ireland, coming in as a substitute replacing Dominique Randle in the 67th minute.

She would make five appearances at the 2022 AFF Women's Championship which the Philippines won.

In June 2023, Cowart was selected as part of the 23 player Philippines squad for the 2023 FIFA Women's World Cup, which was co-hosted in Australia and New Zealand. She started and played in three group-stage matches during the tournament, including a historic victory against New Zealand women's national football team.

In 2025, Cowart was part of the Philippines squad which won qualification for the 2026 AFC Women's Asian Cup.

In February 2026, Cowart was named to the roster for the 2026 AFC Women's Asian Cup, having previously played in all of the Philippines' matches during a gold medal-winning performance at the 2025 Southeast Asian Games.

==== International goals ====
No.	Date	Venue	Opponent	Score	Result	Competition
1.	July 17, 2022	Rizal Memorial Stadium, Manila, Philippines	Thailand	1–0	3–0	2022 AFF Women's Championship
2.	December 15, 2022	Wanderers Football Park, Sydney, Australia	Papua New Guinea	3–0	9–0	Friendly
3.	December 11, 2025	IPE Chonburi Stadium, Chonburi, Thailand	Malaysia	3–0	6–0	2025 SEA Games

== Honours ==
Philippines

- AFF Women's Championship: Gold Medal 2022
- 2025 SEA Games: Gold Medal 2025

Northern Super League - Canada

- Northern Super League: Champions 2025
- Vancouver Rise FC: Defensive MVP 2025
