= Trần Thị Hải Linh =

Vietnamese footballer (born 2001)

Personal information
- Date of birth: 8 June 2001 (age 25)
- Place of birth: Gia Lâm, Hanoi, Vietnam
- Height: 1.66 m (5 ft 5 in)
- Position: Defender

Team information
- Current team: Hà Nội I
- Number: 10

Senior career*
| Years | Team | Apps | (Gls) |
| 2015– | Hà Nội I | 47 | (6) |

International career^{‡}
| 2017–2021 | Vietnam U20 | 4 | (1) |
| 2022– | Vietnam | 25 | (1) |
- * Club domestic league appearances and goals ‡ National team caps and goals as of 25 July 2023

Trần Thị Hải Linh (born 8 June 2001) is a Vietnamese footballer who plays as a defender for Vietnam Women's Championship club Hà Nội I and the Vietnam women's national team.

== International appearances ==
As of match played 01 August 2023

Appearances and goals by national team and year
| National Team | Year | Apps | Goals |
|---|---|---|---|
| Vietnam | 2022 | 9 | 0 |
| Vietnam | 2023 | 12 | 0 |
| Total | | 21 | 0 |

List of international goals scored by Trần Thị Hải Linh
| No. | Date | Venue | Opponent | Score | Result | Competition |
|---|---|---|---|---|---|---|
| 1. | 29 November 2023 | Lokomotiv Stadium, Tashkent, Uzbekistan | India | 2–0 | 3–1 | 2024 AFC Women's Olympic Qualifying Tournament |
| 2. | 5 December 2025 | Chonburi Stadium, Chonburi, Thailand | Malaysia | 4–0 | 7–0 | 2025 SEA Games |
