= Hoàng Thị Loan =

Vietnamese woman best known as Ho Chi Minh's mother

Hoàng Thị Loan (黃氏鸞, 1868–1901) was the mother of Nguyễn Sinh Cung, later known as Ho Chi Minh, former President of Democratic Republic of Vietnam. Loan was born in the Hoàng Trù village of the Nam Đàn district in 1868. She was the second daughter of Hoang Duong, a well-educated village native. Loan married Nguyễn Sinh Sắc in 1883 and birthed three children, Nguyễn Sinh Cung, Nguyễn Sinh Khiêm, and Nguyễn Thị Thanh. Loan died of disease in 1901, only six years after her family moved to the royal capital of Huế.

In 1922 her grave was moved to Sen village by Nguyễn Thị Thanh, Ho Chi Minh's older sister. Her grave was moved again in 1942 by Nguyễn Sinh Khiêm to the Dong Tranh mountain in fear of government reprisal during the Việt Minh revolutionary movement.

In 1985 a tomb honoring Loan was erected in commemoration of the date of Ho Chi Minh's 95th birthday. The Tomb of Mrs. Hoàng Thị Loan is located on Mount Dong Tranh, in the Nam Đàn District of the Nghệ An Province. In 2005 work was completed on a four-year, 309 billion VND project that included renovation of Loan's grave and the completion of her tomb.
