= Phạm Hải Yến =

Vietnamese footballer (born 1994)

Personal information
- Date of birth: 9 November 1994 (age 31)
- Place of birth: Thường Tín, Hanoi, Vietnam
- Height: 1.62 m (5 ft 4 in)
- Position: Forward

Team information
- Current team: Hà Nội I
- Number: 12

Senior career*
Years	Team	Apps	(Gls)
2011–	Hà Nội I	138	(92)

International career^{‡}
2010–2012	Vietnam U20	5	(2)
2011–	Vietnam	100	(59)
- * Club domestic league appearances and goals ‡ National team caps and goals as of 7 March 2026

Phạm Hải Yến (born 9 November 1994) is a Vietnamese footballer. She plays as a forward for Hanoi I FC and the Vietnam women's national team, and serves as captain for Hanoi I FC.

She was born in Hà Tây, a former province in northern Vietnam. After Hà Tây was merged into Hanoi, she joined and progressed through the youth academy of Hà Nội Club. With Hà Nội's U19 side, Hải Yến won the national U19 championship twice. She then graduated to the senior team, where she has claimed three national league titles and finished runner-up in the National Cup once. Individually, she was top scorer in the National Championship three times and top scorer in the National Cup once. In recognition of her achievements, she was appointed club captain ahead of the 2019 season.

Internationally, Hải Yến helped Vietnam's U16 team to third place at the 2009 AFF U-16 Youth Championship. She was spotted and called up to the senior national team by coach Trần Vân Phát in 2011, making her debut in the qualifiers for the 2012 London Olympics at 17. She has since completed the full set of regional honours, winning the AFF Women's Championship and two SEA Games gold medals. Her header against Thailand in the 2019 SEA Games final secured Vietnam's sixth-ever women's football gold in SEA Games history.

== Personal life ==
Hải Yến was born on 9 November 1994 in Nghiem Xa Village, Nghiem Xuyen Commune, Thuong Tin District, in the former Ha Tay Province of northern Vietnam. Nghiem Xa was historically renowned as a scholarly village in the Thuong Tin prefecture of the Son Nam administrative region, having produced seven Confucian doctorate laureates during the feudal era. Today, the village lies on the outskirts of Hanoi, approximately 30 kilometres south of the city centre.

Nghiem Xuyen Commune is a low-lying floodplain situated along the lower Nhuệ River at the junction of Thuong Tin, Thanh Oai, and Phu Xuyen districts. Hải Yến was raised in a hardworking farming family with no prior involvement in professional football. Her father is Pham Van Muoi, her mother is Pham Thi Phuong, and she has one younger brother.

== Club career ==
Hà Tây, where Phạm Hải Yến was born and raised, has long been regarded as a stronghold of women's football in Vietnam, which helped foster her early passion for the sport. In her native village of Nghiêm Xá, a local women's football team was coached by teacher Dương Khắc Kiểm, giving Hải Yến the opportunity to train under his guidance alongside older players on a daily basis.

While in the eighth grade, she was accepted into the youth team of Hà Tây's women's football club. She subsequently moved to Hà Đông to continue her training and pursue a professional football career. Her youth cohort also included future Vietnam international defender Hoàng Thị Loan, who was from Thanh Oai District.

Following the merger of Hà Tây Province into Hanoi, Hải Yến continued her development with Hanoi's youth team, helping the club's under-19 side win consecutive national championships in 2012 and 2013. At the 2013 National U19 Championship, she equalled Tuyết Dung's achievement from 2011 by winning the title while also receiving the tournament's two major individual honours: Best Player and Top Scorer, after scoring seven goals.

=== Hanoi ===
2011–2014: First championships

Ahead of the 2011 season, Hải Yến was promoted to the first team of Hanoi Tràng An 1 (now known as Hanoi) to compete in the Vietnamese Women's National Championship. Wearing the number 19 shirt under head coach Giả Quảng Thác (假廣搨), she won her first national title in her debut season, although she played a limited role in the team's success.

During the 2012 season, she scored her first goal in the national championship in Round 6 against city rivals Hanoi II. In Round 10, she scored an 88th-minute winner to secure a 3–2 victory over hosts Phong Phú Hà Nam before a crowd of approximately 12,000 spectators, an unusually large attendance for a women's league match. The victory moved Hanoi I above Hà Nam into second place, and the club ultimately finished the season as runners-up.

For the 2013 season, Hải Yến changed to the number 12 shirt, which would become closely associated with her career. She scored Hanoi I's opening goal of the season in the team's first match against Hanoi II, helping the club begin its campaign with a victory. She later scored again in the reverse fixture, sealing a 2–0 win. At the end of the season, she won her second national championship as Hanoi I claimed its ninth league title.

In the 2014 season, Hải Yến continued her development by scoring four league goals, finishing two behind the competition's top scorer, Nguyễn Thị Muôn. She also played an important role in helping Hanoi I secure its tenth national championship. At the age of 20, she was regarded as a potential successor to the club's established forwards, including Minh Nguyệt, Nguyễn Thị Muôn, and Nguyễn Thị Hòa.

2015–2016

During the 2015 season, Hải Yến continued her progress by finishing as the league's top scorer with ten goals. Despite her individual success, Hanoi finished one point behind Ho Chi Minh City in the title race. One of the season's defining matches was the final-round meeting between the two sides, which ended in a 2–2 draw. Hanoi I led from the first half until the closing stages before Ho Chi Minh City scored twice within six minutes to take the lead. Nguyễn Thị Xuyến equalised in the 91st minute, keeping Hanoi's title hopes alive, although the team was unable to find a winning goal during the remaining stoppage time.

As a result of her performances during the 2015 season, Hải Yến was nominated for the Vietnam Golden Ball awards. It was her first appearance on the preliminary shortlist of ten female players and she was also named among the three finalists for the Best Young Female Player award, as announced by the Sài Gòn Giải Phóng newspaper.

In 2016, Hải Yến maintained consistent form as Hanoi I finished top of the league standings after completing a 14-match unbeaten run across the two regular rounds. Under the competition format used in previous seasons, this record would have been sufficient to secure the club's eleventh national championship. However, beginning that season, the organisers introduced a knockout stage involving the top four teams to determine the champion.

In the semi-finals against Than Khoáng Sản Việt Nam, Hải Yến scored twice within the opening eleven minutes to help Hanoi I progress comfortably to the final. In the final, however, Hanoi suffered its only defeat of the season, losing to long-time rivals Ho Chi Minh City after conceding two first-half goals. The result denied Hanoi the championship, with the title instead going to the side led by head coach Kim Chi and captain Kiều Trinh.

== International career ==
On 20 October 2011, she scored her first hat-trick against Indonesia at the 2011 AFF Women's Championship.

=== International Apps ===
As of match played 14 December 2025

Appearances and goals by national team and year
National Team	Year	Apps	Goals
Vietnam	2011	3	3
Vietnam	2012	0	0
Vietnam	2013	0	0
Vietnam	2014	2	1
Vietnam	2015	1	0
Vietnam	2016	7	1
Vietnam	2017	7	6
Vietnam	2018	13	4
Vietnam	2019	11	8
Vietnam	2020	4	0
Vietnam	2021	2	8
Vietnam	2022	18	6
Vietnam	2023	16	8
Vietnam	2024	2	1
Vietnam	2025	12	11
Total		98	59

=== International goals ===
Scores and results are list Vietnam's goal tally first

No.	Cap.	Date	Venue	Opponent	Score	Result	Competition
1.	3.	20 October 2011	Vientiane, Laos	Indonesia	6–0	14–0	2011 AFF Women's Championship
2.	3.	20 October 2011	Vientiane, Laos	Indonesia	8–0	14–0	2011 AFF Women's Championship
3.	3.	20 October 2011	Vientiane, Laos	Indonesia	14–0	14–0	2011 AFF Women's Championship
4.	4.	23 September 2014	Incheon, South Korea	Hong Kong	5–0	5–0	2014 Asian Games
5.	10.	26 July 2016	Mandalay, Myanmar	Singapore	13–0	14–0	2016 AFF Women's Championship
6.	14.	5 April 2017	Hanoi, Vietnam	Syria	2–0	11–0	2018 AFC Women's Asian Cup qualification
7.	14.	5 April 2017	Hanoi, Vietnam	Syria	6–0	11–0	2018 AFC Women's Asian Cup qualification
8.	15.	9 April 2017	Hanoi, Vietnam	Iran	2–1	6–1	2018 AFC Women's Asian Cup qualification
9.	15.	9 April 2017	Hanoi, Vietnam	Iran	5–1	6–1	2018 AFC Women's Asian Cup qualification
10.	18.	20 August 2017	Kuala Lumpur, Malaysia	Myanmar	1–0	3–1	2017 Southeast Asian Games
11.	19.	22 August 2017	Shah Alam, Malaysia	Thailand	1–0	1–1	2017 Southeast Asian Games
12.	26.	3 July 2018	Palembang, Indonesia	Indonesia	3–0	6–0	2018 AFF Women's Championship
13.	29.	9 July 2018	Palembang, Indonesia	Myanmar	1–0	4–3	2018 AFF Women's Championship
14.	29.	9 July 2018	Palembang, Indonesia	Myanmar	2–0	4–3	2018 AFF Women's Championship
15.	30.	13 July 2018	Palembang, Indonesia	Myanmar	3–0	3–0	2018 AFF Women's Championship
16.	34.	16 August 2019	Chonburi, Thailand	Cambodia	4–0	10–0	2019 AFF Women's Championship
17.	34.	16 August 2019	Chonburi, Thailand	Cambodia	5–0	10–0	2019 AFF Women's Championship
18.	34.	16 August 2019	Chonburi, Thailand	Cambodia	10–0	10–0	2019 AFF Women's Championship
19.	35.	18 August 2019	Chonburi, Thailand	Indonesia	3–0	7–0	2019 AFF Women's Championship
20.	36.	20 August 2019	Chonburi, Thailand	Myanmar	1–0	4–0	2019 AFF Women's Championship
21.	36.	20 August 2019	Chonburi, Thailand	Myanmar	3–0	4–0	2019 AFF Women's Championship
22.	40.	6 November 2019	Hanoi, Vietnam	India	1–0	1–1	Friendly
23.	44.	8 December 2019	Manila, Philippines	Thailand	1–0	1–0 (a.e.t.)	2019 Southeast Asian Games
24.	49.	23 September 2021	Dushanbe, Tajikistan	Maldives	7–0	16–0	2022 AFC Women's Asian Cup qualification
25.	49.	23 September 2021	Dushanbe, Tajikistan	Maldives	9–0	16–0	2022 AFC Women's Asian Cup qualification
26.	49.	23 September 2021	Dushanbe, Tajikistan	Maldives	12–0	16–0	2022 AFC Women's Asian Cup qualification
27.	49.	23 September 2021	Dushanbe, Tajikistan	Maldives	13–0	16–0	2022 AFC Women's Asian Cup qualification
28.	49.	23 September 2021	Dushanbe, Tajikistan	Maldives	14–0	16–0	2022 AFC Women's Asian Cup qualification
29.	49.	23 September 2021	Dushanbe, Tajikistan	Maldives	16–0	16–0	2022 AFC Women's Asian Cup qualification
30.	50.	29 September 2021	Dushanbe, Tajikistan	Tajikistan	1–0	7–0	2022 AFC Women's Asian Cup qualification
31.	50.	29 September 2021	Dushanbe, Tajikistan	Tajikistan	5–0	7–0	2022 AFC Women's Asian Cup qualification
32.	59.	14 May 2022	Cẩm Phả, Vietnam	Cambodia	2–0	7–0	2021 Southeast Asian Games
33.	63.	7 July 2022	Biñan, Philippines	Cambodia	2–0	3–0	2022 AFF Women's Championship
34.	64.	9 July 2022	Biñan, Philippines	Laos	3–0	5–0	2022 AFF Women's Championship
35.	64.	9 July 2022	Biñan, Philippines	Laos	4–0	5–0	2022 AFF Women's Championship
36.	66.	13 July 2022	Biñan, Philippines	Myanmar	4–0	4–0	2022 AFF Women's Championship
37.	68.	17 July 2022	Manila, Philippines	Myanmar	3–2	3–4	2022 AFF Women's Championship
38.	69.	5 April 2023	Kathmandu, Nepal	Nepal	1–0	5–1	2024 AFC Women's Olympic Qualifying Tournament
39.	70.	8 April 2023	Kathmandu, Nepal	Nepal	1–0	2–0	2024 AFC Women's Olympic Qualifying Tournament
40.	70.	8 April 2023	Kathmandu, Nepal	Nepal	2–0	2–0	2024 AFC Women's Olympic Qualifying Tournament
41.	71.	3 May 2023	Phnom Penh, Cambodia	Malaysia	1–0	3–0	2023 Southeast Asian Games
42.	73.	12 May 2023	Phnom Penh, Cambodia	Cambodia	2–0	4–0	2023 Southeast Asian Games
43.	80.	22 September 2023	Wenzhou, China	Nepal	1–0	2–0	2022 Asian Games
44.	81.	25 September 2023	Wenzhou, China	Bangladesh	1–0	6–1	2022 Asian Games
45.	84.	29 October 2023	Tashkent, Uzbekistan	India	3–0	3–1	2024 AFC Women's Olympic Qualifying Tournament
46.	85.	23 October 2024	Chongqing, China	Uzbekistan	2–0	2–0	2024 Yongchuan International Tournament
47.	87.	29 June 2025	Việt Trì, Vietnam	Maldives	7–0	7–0	2026 AFC Women's Asian Cup qualification
48.	88.	2 July 2025	Việt Trì, Vietnam	United Arab Emirates	5–0	6–0	2026 AFC Women's Asian Cup qualification
49.	89.	5 July 2025	Việt Trì, Vietnam	Guam	4–0	4–0	2026 AFC Women's Asian Cup qualification
50.	90.	6 August 2025	Hải Phòng, Vietnam	Cambodia	3–0	6–0	2025 ASEAN Women's Championship
51.	91.	9 August 2025	Hải Phòng, Vietnam	Indonesia	3–0	7–0	2025 ASEAN Women's Championship
52.	91.	9 August 2025	Hải Phòng, Vietnam	Indonesia	6–0	7–0	2025 ASEAN Women's Championship
53.	94.	19 August 2025	Hải Phòng, Vietnam	Thailand	1–0	3–1	2025 ASEAN Women's Championship
54.	95.	5 December 2025	Chonburi, Thailand	Malaysia	1–0	7–0	2025 SEA Games
55.	95.	5 December 2025	Chonburi, Thailand	Malaysia	3–0	7–0	2025 SEA Games
56.	97.	14 December 2025	Chonburi, Thailand	Indonesia	2–0	5–0	2025 SEA Games
57.	97.	14 December 2025	Chonburi, Thailand	Indonesia	3–0	5–0	2025 SEA Games

== Medals ==
AFF Women's Championship

Winners (1): 2019
(silver) Runners-up (1): 2016
(bronze) Third place (3): 2011, 2013, 2018

- SEA Games

(gold) Gold Medal (4): 2017, 2019, 2021, 2023
