= Mai Đức Chung =

Vietnamese football manager (born 1951)

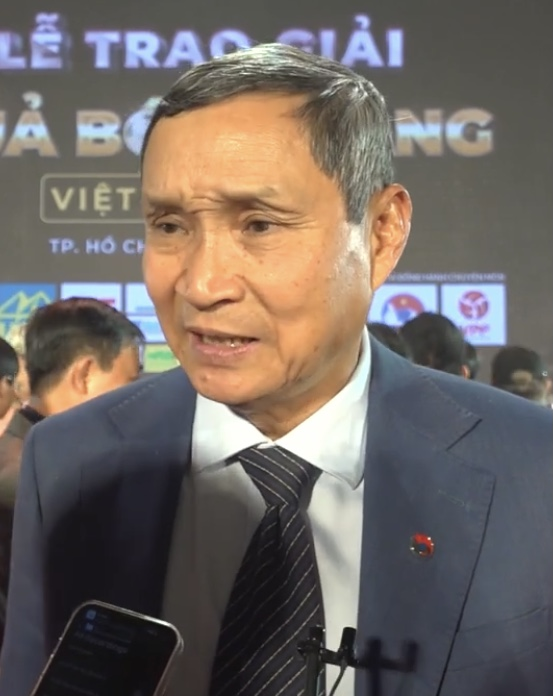
- Mai Đức Chung in 2023

Personal information
- Full name: Mai Đức Chung
- Date of birth: 21 June 1951 (age 75)
- Place of birth: Hanoi, North Vietnam
- Positions: Midfielder; utility player

Senior career*
Years	Team	Apps	(Gls)
–1975	Xe Ca Hà Nội		
1975–1984	Tổng Cục Đường Sắt		

International career
1981–1984	Vietnam	5	(0)

Managerial career
- 1997: Vietnam Women
- 2003–2005: Vietnam Women
- 2007: Vietnam (assistant)
- 2008: Vietnam U22
- 2009–2010: Becamex Bình Dương
- 2010–2011: Navibank Sài Gòn
- 2012: Vietnam U19
- 2013–2014: Thanh Hóa
- 2014: Vietnam Women (interim)
- 2015: Vietnam U22
- 2016–2026: Vietnam Women
- 2017: Vietnam (interim)
- * Club domestic league appearances and goals

Mai Đức Chung (born 21 June 1951) is a Vietnamese former football player and coach, currently serving as the manager of the Vietnam women's national football team. As of 2023, he is the oldest head coach of any national football team—men's or women's—at the FIFA World Cup.

== Playing career ==
Mai Đức Chung was a versatile player who could play in multiple positions. His preferred positions were midfielder or striker, but when needed, he could also play as a defender. During his peak, he was nicknamed "Chung Athletics" due to his tireless running ability. Starting his career as a player, he received offers from prominent clubs of the time, such as Tổng cục Đường sắt and Công an Hà Nội. However, he chose to play for a lower-tier club, Xe ca Hà Nội, which is also the origin of his nickname, Chung "Xe ca." In September 1975, he joined Tổng cục Đường sắt, where he stayed until his retirement. With the club, he won his first national championship in 1980. He was called up to the national team between 1981 and 1982 to compete abroad. Mai Đức Chung retired from football in 1984.

== Managerial and coaching career ==
=== Vietnam national youth teams ===
For a long time, Mai Đức Chung served as the top assistant to coach Alfred Riedl in the men's national football team. In 2007, when Mr. Riedl was absent due to undergoing kidney transplant surgery, Mai Đức Chung took charge of the Vietnam Olympic men's football team during the second and third rounds of the 2008 Beijing Olympic men's football qualifiers.

After losing the semi-final match at the 2007 Southeast Asian Games against the Myanmar U-23 team, the VFF fired Alfred Riedl, and Mai Đức Chung replaced him as the head coach. He led the Vietnam U-23 team to the bronze medal match against the Singapore U-23 team, but they lost 0–5. This remains the Vietnam U-23 team's record defeat.

In 2008, the VFF appointed him as head coach of the Vietnam U-22 team. In October 2008, he led the Vietnam U-22 football team to victory in the 2008 Merdeka Cup in Malaysia, drawing 0–0 with the Malaysian national team after two extra times and winning 6–5 in a penalty shootout.

=== Becamex Binh Duong ===
In May 2009, Mai Đức Chung was unexpectedly appointed head coach of Becamex Bình Dương football club. His achievement during his first stint in charge was leading the team to the semi-finals of the 2009 AFC Cup, marking the best performance by a Vietnamese football club in the continental competition to date. At the end of the 2009 V-League season, Bình Dương finished in second place.

In April 2010, after the first 8 rounds of the 2010 V-League season, the leadership of Becamex Bình Dương was dissatisfied with the team's performance, as they were in 4th place on the table at the time. As a result, they fired him.

In 2015, Mai Đức Chung returned to Becamex Bình Dương in the middle of the season to replace his predecessor, Lê Thụy Hải, as the team's technical director. Under his guidance, Bình Dương quickly regained their form and successfully defended the V.League championship, securing their second consecutive title and fourth in the club's history. Additionally, they won the 2015 National Cup for the first time.

=== Navibank Sài Gòn ===
Shortly after being fired by Becamex Bình Dương, he became the coach of Navibank Saigon. Under his guidance, Navibank Saigon won the 2011 National Cup championship. At the end of January 2012, he was appointed head coach of the Vietnam national U-19 team.

=== Thanh Hóa ===
In early February 2013, he officially became the head coach of Thanh Hóa after the club unexpectedly sacked Triệu Quang Hà. During his time there, he became involved in a controversy following a clash with a Đồng Tâm Long An fan after a 0–2 loss to Đồng Tâm Long An in the 2014 V.League season. Disagreeing with the club's leadership over a contract issue, coach Mai Đức Chung decided to part ways with the team with just three rounds remaining in the 2014 season, coinciding with his return to the national women's team.

=== Vietnam women's national football team ===
Mai Đức Chung was the first head coach of the Vietnam women's national football team in 1997, leading the team to win the team's first ever international tournament, the friendly Toh Puan Datuk Seri Saadiah Sardon Trophy in Malaysia. He later assisted head hoach Trần Thanh Ngữ to help the team win bronze medal at the 1997 Southeast Asian Games. He became the team head coach in 2003 and lead the team winning the first two SEA Games gold medals in 2003 and 2005 before taking a long break from leading the women's team.

In 2014, in preparation for the women's team to attend the 2014 Asian Games, the VFF hired Mai Đức Chung Chung to manage the team. Under Mai's management, the Vietnamese women's team reached the semi-finals and finished 4th at the 2014 Asian Games, their best achievement at the competition to date. His successes with the women's team continued as they won gold medals at the 2017, 2019, 2021, and 2023 SEA Games, along with the 2019 AFF Women's Championship title.

However, Mai Đức Chung's career with the national women's football team reached its pinnacle in early 2022. After defeating Thailand and Chinese Taipei in a series of play-off matches for the 2023 World Cup at the 2022 Asian Cup, the Vietnamese women's team secured the only remaining direct ticket to the World Cup. This was the first time in history that a Vietnamese national football team, men or women, had qualified for the world's biggest tournament. More importantly, this achievement came after his team faced numerous challenges before and throughout the tournament due to the COVID-19 pandemic.

After achieving unprecedented success with the women's team, Mai Đức Chung expressed his desire to step down and not participate in the upcoming 2023 World Cup. At the time of his rumored withdrawal, he was over 70 years old and considered himself unfit to handle the pressure of important matches or tournaments.

Despite this, Mai Đức Chung continued to lead the Vietnam national team at the 2023 FIFA Women's World Cup in New Zealand, setting the record for the oldest coach in World Cup history at the age of 73. He surpassed Otto Rehhagel, who was 71 when he led the Greece team at the 2010 FIFA World Cup.

He continued to lead the Vietnam national team until March 2026, parting aways with the team after the 2026 AFC Women's Asian Cup, as his contract with VFF ended.

=== Vietnam men's national football team ===
In 2017, after Nguyễn Hữu Thắng resigned as head coach of the men's national football team and the national U23 team following the U23 team's elimination from the group stage of men's football at the 2017 Southeast Asian Games, the Vietnam Football Federation asked Mai Đức Chung to serve as interim coach for the men's team during the 2019 AFC Asian Cup qualifying round against Cambodia. This was the second time he accepted the role as interim coach of the national men's football team. He led the team to victories in both Asian Cup qualifying matches against Cambodia, both home and away, helping the team move from 3rd place to 2nd in the group. After the VFF appointed Park Hang-seo as head coach of both the men's national team and the national U23 team, Mai Đức Chung returned to his position as head coach of the women's national team.

== Personal life ==
Mai Đức Chung was born in Ngọc Hà Flower Village, Hanoi, but his hometown is in Hưng Yên. His birth year is 1951, although many of his peers believe he was born in 1949. He was the second child in a family of six sisters. As a child, he often received tickets to attend football matches, thanks to his mother working at Hàng Đẫy Stadium. The matches there, especially the confrontations between the North Vietnamese team and teams from the socialist bloc, such as China PR, DPR Korea, and Mongolia, sparked his passion for football at an early age. In 1964, Chung enrolled in the preparatory class at Tu Sơn University of Physical Education and Sports and graduated in 1972.

Mai Đức Chung married Phạm Thị Ngọc Uyên (born in 1952), a primary school teacher, in 1977. The couple has two sons, one of whom is Mai Quang Hưng (born in 1981), a former Vietnam U-19 player who later became a star player for the Vietnam national team, alongside players such as Dương Hồng Sơn, Huy Hoàng, and Nguyễn Việt Thắng.

== Honours ==
=== Player ===
Tong Cuc Duong Sat

- V.League 1: 1980

=== Manager ===
Becamex Bình Dương

- V.League 1: 2015
- Vietnamese National Football Cup: 2015

Navibank Sài Gòn

- Vietnamese National Football Cup: 2011

Vietnam national under-23 football team

- Merdeka Cup: 2008

Vietnam women's national football team

- SEA Games: Gold medal (2003, 2005, 2017, 2019, 2021, 2023)
- AFF Women's Championship: 2019
- Asian Games: 4th place (2014)

=== Individual ===
- Second-class Labor Order (2019)
- First-class Labor Order (2022)
- Hero of Labor (2025)
