= Nguyễn Thị Trúc Hương =

Vietnamese footballer (born 2000)

Personal information
- Date of birth: 4 March 2000 (age 26)
- Place of birth: Quảng Ngãi, Vietnam
- Height: 1.60 m (5 ft 3 in)
- Position: Winger

Team information
- Current team: Than KSVN
- Number: 8

Youth career
- –2018: Than KSVN

Senior career*
Years	Team	Apps	(Gls)
2018–	Than KSVN		

International career^{‡}
2014–2015	Vietnam U16		
2019	Vietnam U19		
2022–	Vietnam	22	(1)
- * Club domestic league appearances and goals ‡ National team caps and goals as of 25 September 2026

Nguyễn Thị Trúc Hương (born 4 March 2000) is a Vietnamese footballer who plays as a winger for V-Women's League club Than KSVN and the Vietnam women's national team.

== Club career ==
Trúc Hương made his debut Than KSVN in the 2018 National League.

In the 2024 National League, Trúc Hương helped her team finish second in the league with 14 goals. She was also the league top goalscorer.

== International career ==
In 2021, Trúc Hương was called up to the Vietnam national team for the first time. Her first major tournament with the national team was the 2022 Asian Games.
