= Chonburi Stadium =

Stadium in Chonburi Province, Thailand

Chonburi Daikin Stadium
- Chonburi Stadium
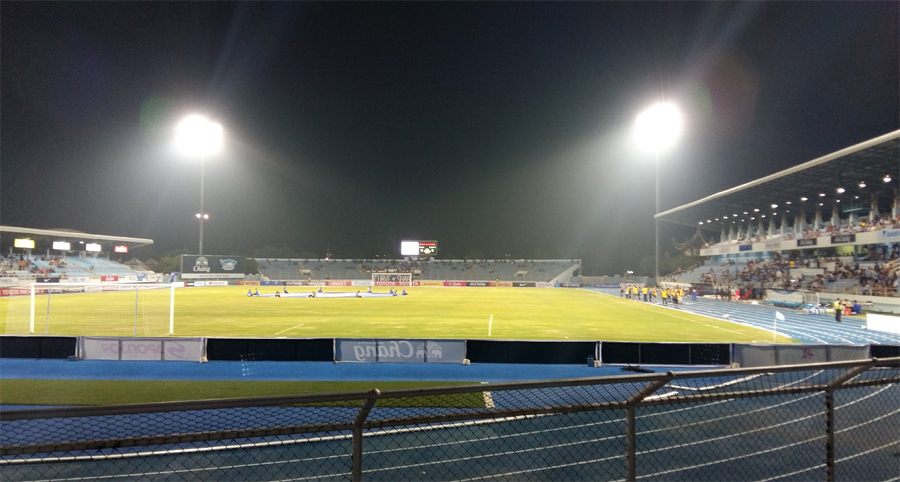
- Interactive map of Chonburi Daikin Stadium
- Full name: Chonburi Daikin Stadium
- Former names: Chonburi Stadium (2011-2023)
- Location: Samet, Mueang Chonburi, Chonburi, Thailand
- Coordinates: 13°20′11″N 100°57′23″E
- Owner: Chonburi Provincial Administration Organization
- Operator: Chonburi
- Capacity: 8,680
- Surface: Grass

Construction
- Opened: 2010

Tenant
- Chonburi (2011–present)

Chonburi Daikin Stadium (Thai: ชลบุรี สเตเดียม หรือ สนาม อบจ. ชลบุรี) is a multi-use stadium in Mueang Chonburi, Chonburi Province, Thailand. It is currently used mostly for football matches and is the home stadium of Chonburi Football Club. The stadium holds 8,680 people.

== History ==
The stadium was used for the first time a season in 2012 for the Thai Premier League and also used to play in the AFC Cup as well as their first time in this competition. After the earlier of the playing in AFC competition, The stadium is not qualified to be used in the field so they use Supachalasai Stadium in previous years. But at end of 2012, the stadium can be used and led the team to reach the semi-finals in the 2012 AFC Cup for the club's first time in Chonburi history.

Timor-Leste national team has chosen Chonburi Stadium as their home venue for the 2026 ASEAN Championship because the country does not have any stadium that meets the requirements for hosting international matches.

== International Matches ==
The stadium has hosted a variety of international FIFA and AFC matches. Below are the matches played.

=== Men's Friendly ===
Date	Time (UTC+7)	Team #1	Result	Team #2	Round	Source
24 March 2022	19:00	Thailand	2–0	Nepal	Friendly	

=== Football at the 2025 SEA Games – Women's tournament ===
Date	Time (UTC+7)	Team #1	Result	Team #2	Round
4 December 2025	18:30	Thailand	8–0	Indonesia	Group A
5 December 2025	18:30	Vietnam	7–0	Malaysia	Group B
8 December 2025	18:30	Philippines	1–0	Vietnam	Group B
10 December 2025	18:30	Thailand	2–0	Singapore	Group A
11 December 2025	18:30	Vietnam	2–0	Myanmar	Group B
14 December 2025	18:30	Thailand	1–1 (2–4)	Philippines	Semi–final
17 December 2025	15:30	Thailand	2–0	Indonesia	Bronze Medal Match
17 December 2025	19:30	Philippines	0–0 (6–5)	Vietnam	Final

=== 2026 ASEAN Championship ===
Date	Time (UTC+7)	Team #1	Result	Team #2	Round	Attendance
24 July 2026	20:30	Timor-Leste	0–7	Vietnam	Group A	195
31 July 2026	17:00	Timor-Leste	0–3	Indonesia	Group A	189
