= Institute of Physical Education Chonburi Campus Stadium =

Sports stadium in Mueang Chonburi, Thailand

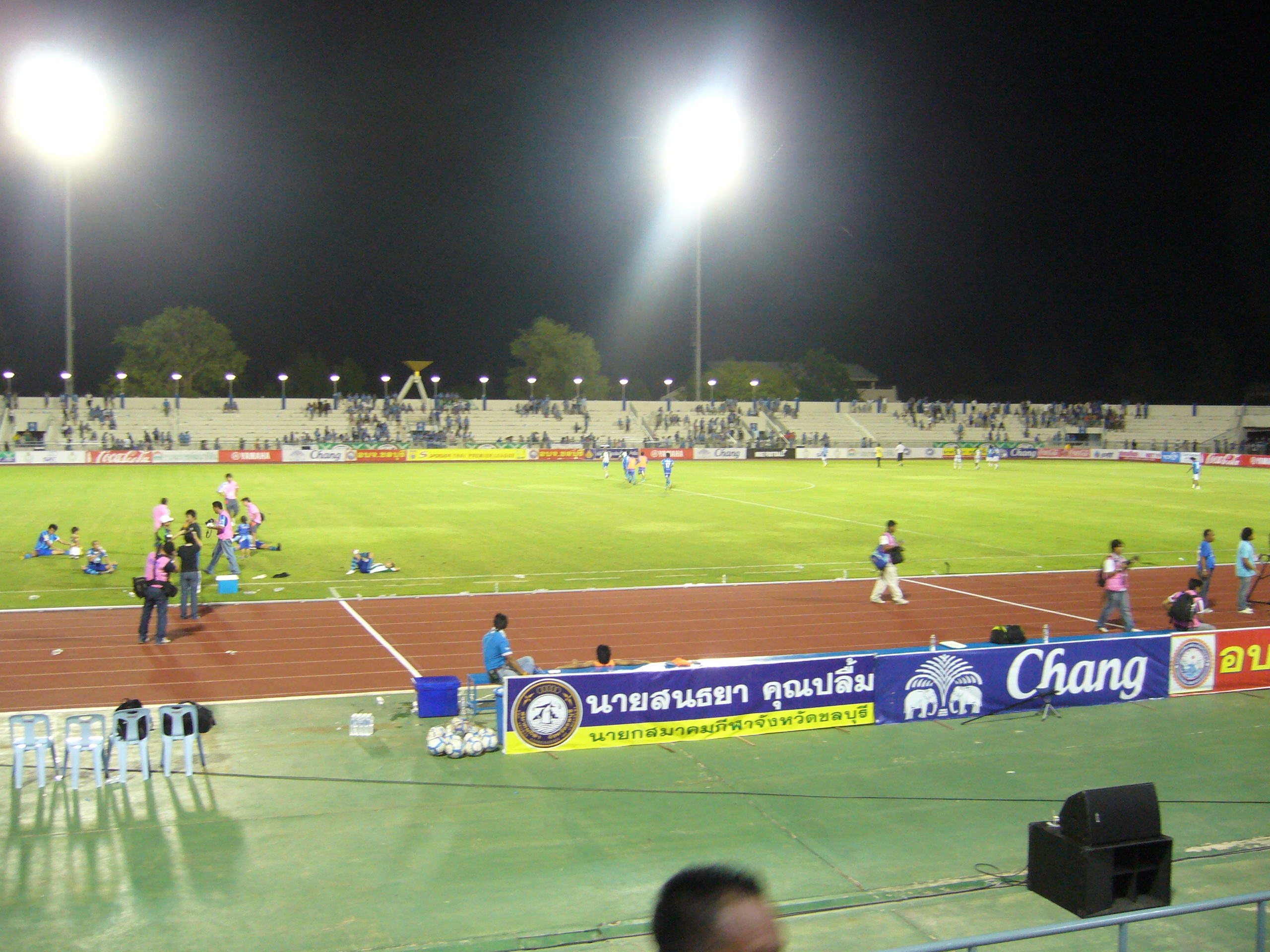
- Interactive map of Institute of Physical Education Chonburi Campus Stadium
- Location: Mueang Chonburi, Chon Buri, Thailand
- Coordinates: 13°24′41″N 100°59′37″E
- Owner: Institute of Physical Education
- Operator: Institute of Physical Education
- Capacity: 11,000
- Surface: Grass

Construction
- Opened: 27 March 2010

Institute of Physical Education Chonburi Campus Stadium or IPE Chonburi Stadium (Thai: สนามสถาบันการพลศึกษา วิทยาเขตชลบุรี) is a sports stadium located on the Institute of Physical Education Chonburi Campus in Mueang Chonburi District, Chonburi Province, Thailand. The stadium holds 11,000 people. It is currently used mostly for football matches; it is the former home stadium of Pattaya United F.C. and Chonburi F.C. It is fitted with floodlights, enabling evening matches to be played. The stadium also has a running track, as do most stadiums in Thailand.
