= Football in Vietnam =

Association football in Vietnam
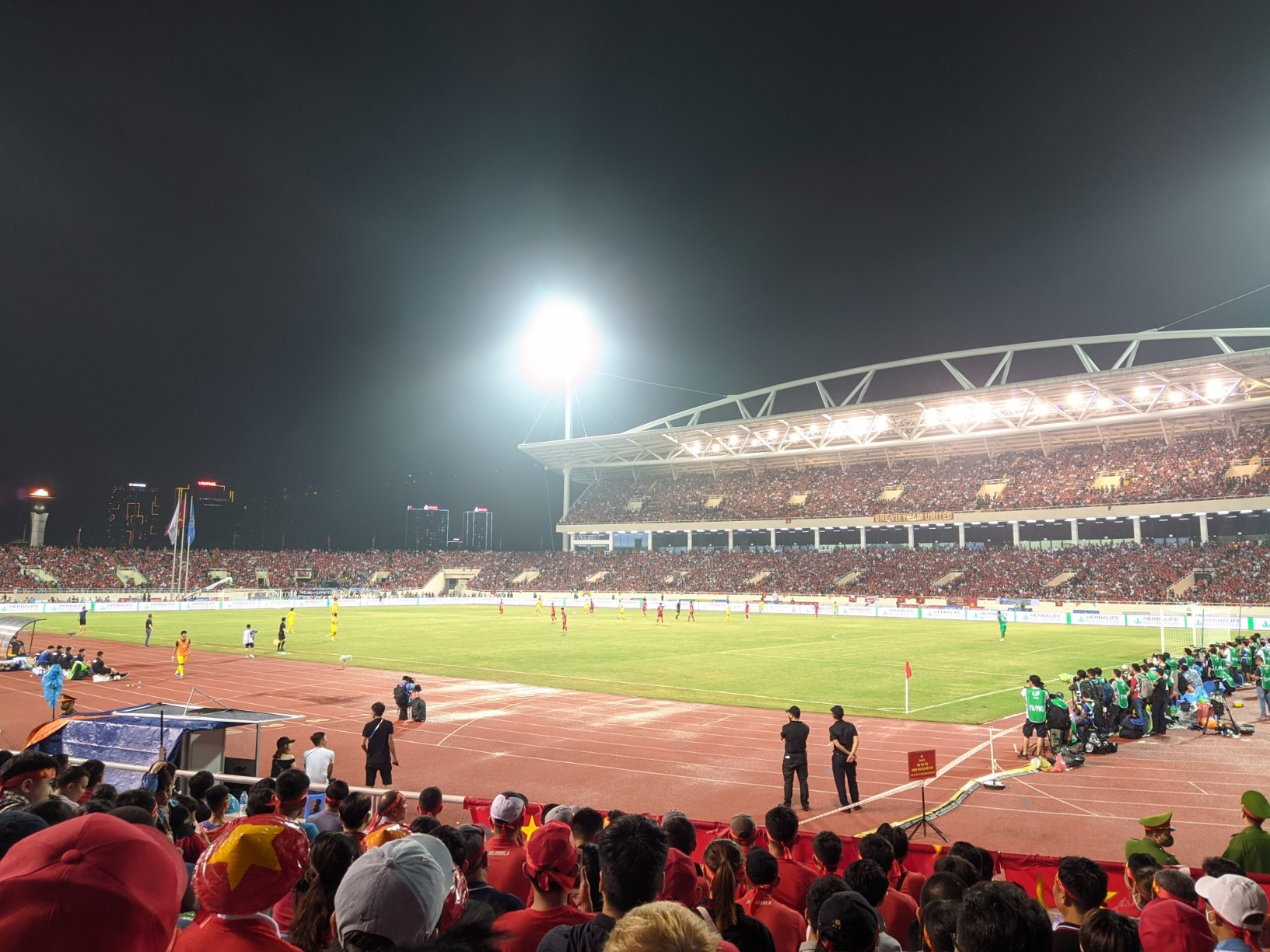
- My Dinh National Stadium during the 31st SEA Games Men's Football Final
- Country: Vietnam
- Governing body: Vietnam Football Federation (VFF)
- National teams: Men's national team Women's national team

National competitions
- National Cup; Women's National Cup

Club competitions
- V.League 1 V.League 2 Women's National League; Vietnam Futsal League

International competitions
- AFC Cup; AFC Champions League; FIFA World Cup; FIFA Women's World Cup; AFC Asian Cup; AFC Women's Asian Cup; AFC Futsal Asian Cup; FIFA Futsal World Cup; FIFA U-20 World Cup; FIFA U-17 World Cup; AFC U-20 Asian Cup; AFC U-17 Asian Cup

Football in Vietnam is run by the Vietnam Football Federation (VFF). The federation administers the Vietnam men's and women's national football teams. It is responsible for the national football leagues, including the V.League 1, which is a top tier league. Association football is the most popular sport in Vietnam. According to a Nielsen survey, approximately 75% of the people in Vietnam are football fans.

Football as we know it today, was reported to have come into Vietnam in 1896 with French influence due to colonization. It was first introduced in the then colony of Cochinchina (modern-day southern Vietnam) and then spread to the central and northern parts.

When Vietnam was divided into North Vietnam and South Vietnam (between 1954 and 1976), two national teams existed. The North Vietnamese played almost exclusively against other communist countries between 1956 and 1966, while the South Vietnamese team took part in the first two AFC Asian Cup finals, finishing fourth both times.

== History ==
=== Until 1954 ===
==== Cochinchina ====
Football was introduced to Saigon by French civil servants, merchants and soldiers. Some locals also adopted the game at the time. A club called Cercle Sportif Saigonnais (Saigon Sports Circle) was founded. Games were played at the city park, called Jardin de la Ville (today Tao Đàn Park).

In 1905, a British warship named after King Alfred visited Saigon and its football team had a friendly match against a local team composed of Vietnamese and French players. This is considered the first international football match in Vietnam.

E. Breton, a member of France's L'Union des Sociétés Français des Sports Athlétiques brought football rules into Vietnam in 1906. As a chairman of the Cercle Sportif Saigonnais, he reorganized the club similar to football clubs in France. Other clubs, such as Infanterie, Saigon Sport, Athletic Club, Stade Militaire and Tabert Club, were founded around that time. Local cups were soon held afterwards. The Cercle Sportif Saigonnais was the most successful team, winning in 1907, 1909, 1910, 1911, 1912, and in 1916.

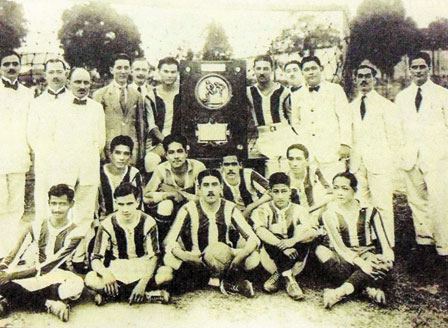
Saigon Sport, one of the first football teams established by French in Indochina.

Some Vietnamese locals learned the game's rules and established their own teams. The first two Vietnamese teams founded in 1907 were Gia Định Sport, run by Ba Vẻ, and Phú Khai and Ngôi Sao Xanh (Blue Star), run by Nguyễn Đình Trị. These two teams merged to form Étoile de Giadinh (Gia Định Star). Prior to 1920, it had defeated all other teams, including the Cercle Sportif Saigonnais (in 1917), and became the champion.

Other teams of the time include: Victoria Sportive, Commerce Sport, Jean Compte, Sport Cholonaise, Khánh Hội Sport, Tân Định Sport, Gò Vấp, Hiệp Hòa, Chợ Quán, Phú Nhuận, Đồng Nai, and Enfants de Troupe; in other provinces: Thủ Dầu Một, Cần Thơ, Sóc Trăng, Sa Đéc, Gò Công, Châu Đốc, Mỹ Tho. New grounds were also developed, namely Citadelle, Renault (in front of current Thống Nhất Stadium), Fourière, Mayer, and Marine.

Football fans and some leaders then managed to form the (Vietnamese) Department of Football. Nguyễn Đình Trị was elected as head of board of directors and the Department itself developed its own field. At that time, there was already a French Department of Football. The French and Vietnamese departments had no cooperation, but some matches were played between sides representing each department, for instance in the Cochinchina Championship. In a match between Cercle Sportif Saigonnais and Étoile de Gia Định in 1925, Paul Thi of Étoile was dismissed by a French referee. This led to his everlasting suspension and further conflicts between the two departments. The Championship was then delayed for many years until it was once again held in 1932, with six Vietnamese and three French teams taking part.

Between 1925 and 1935, Étoile de Giadinh were known for many famous players, e.g. Sách, Thơm, Nhiều, Quý, Tịnh, Xường, Trung, Thi, Vi, Mùi. About 29 cups were held, with Étoile winning 8 of them.

The first women's football team appeared in Vĩnh Long in 1932, called Cái Vồn. Several years later, another team called "Rạch Giá" was founded. In 1933, Cái Vồn had a match with men's Paul Bert team at Mayer Stadium. The match ended in a two-all draw and became historic in Vietnamese football history.

==== Tonkinchina and the Central Zone ====
Football came to the North of Vietnam (or Tonkinchina) in about 1906–1907. Local press reported on matches played by Legion Đáp Cầu and Olympique Hải Phòng in 1909. Olympique won the first match 2–1, whereas the second match was won 8-1 by Legion. In February 1912, Hanoi Football club (Stade Hanoien) was founded. The team was composed of Vietnamese and French players.

==== Vietnam pre-autonomy era ====
Under French colonial rule, the French Indochina Football Federation hosted a few matches against other national teams, fielding a selection composed mainly of players from Saigon or the French Cochinchina football league. Notably, they faced the China in 1936 and 1948. In April 1947, the French Indochina Football Federation selection team went for a tour in British Hong Kong, and played against the British Hong Kong national team.

Two months before signing independence accords, the earliest recognized international game of Vietnam was on 16 January 1949, in a 3-3 draw against South Korea in Saigon. Vietnam later became a member of FIFA in 1952 and the AFC in 1954.

=== 1954-1976 period ===
Vietnam gained its independence from France in 1949, during the First Indochina War. After the war, the Geneva Accord was signed on 21 July 1954, dividing the North and South of Vietnam. As a result, Vietnam soon had different football national teams, co-existing during the Vietnam War. Vietnam (later South Vietnam) became a member of FIFA in 1952 and the AFC in 1954.

==== North Vietnam ====
In North Vietnam, Thể Công team of the People's Army was established on 23 September 1954. The national football team gained notable achievements at some regional events, such as the Ganefo (Indonesia, 1963) and the Asian Ganefo (Cambodia, 1966). The national league was called the North Vietnam V-League.

==== South Vietnam ====
By the late 1950s, South Vietnam national football team had become one of the four strongest teams in Asia, as they advanced into the final round of the 1960 AFC Asian Cup together with South Korea, Israel and the Republic of China. The team also won the 10th Merdeka Cup in Malaysia, 1966. It was one of strongest teams in Southeast Asia.

Clubs AJS, Cảnh sát (Police), Tổng Tham Mưu (ARVN General Staff) and Quan Thuế (Customs) dominated the South's football until 1975. The national league was called the South Vietnam V-League.

=== Since 1976 ===
Vietnam was reunited on 2 July 1976 and returned to international football in 1991, when they participated in the 1991 Southeast Asian Games. They drew 2–2 against the Philippines (the hosting nation), in the first ever match played by a united Vietnam. During the 1990s-2000s, Vietnam had limited international success, mostly due to a lack of investments. Vietnamese football also suffered several corruption scandals, including the 2005 Vietnamese football match-fixing scandal.

Despite this, Vietnam made some notable performances, at the 2007 AFC Asian Cup when Vietnam shocked international football by advancing to the quarter-finals. Their 2–0 victory against the UAE was especially remarkable. The following year, Vietnam won the 2008 AFF Championship, marking a successful period for Vietnamese football, the “first golden generation” and renaissance of Vietnamese football.

Vietnamese football suffered heavy decline in 2009-2016, where they would fail to qualify for 3 Asian cups, and lose the next 4 AFF Suzuki Cups. They also could not qualify for the FIFA World Cup. Meanwhile, the Olympic team did not do well in the next few Asian Games and Southeast Asian Games.

Following the 2017 FIFA U-20 World Cup, Vietnam would start to have tremendous success, after hiring Park Hang-Seo as coach. In 2018, the Vietnam national under-23 football team recorded another remarkable achievement during the 2018 AFC U-23 Championship, winning the silver medal after losing to Uzbekistan in the final, thus becoming the first Southeast Asian team to qualify for the final of an AFC tournament since 1998 when the Thailand U17 won the 1998 AFC U-17 Championship. Later that year, the Olympic team, consisting largely of players who had competed at the U-23 Championship in January, won the fourth place of the 2018 Asian Games, losing 1-3 to South Korea in the semi-final and the UAE on penalty shoot-out in the bronze medal match.

With most of these young players, Vietnam created a fever in 2019 AFC Asian Cup, in which the national team made it to the quarter-finals where they were defeated by eventual runners-up Japan with the score 0–1. Then, in the 2019 Southeast Asian Games, Vietnam won its first gold medal in men's football since 1959.

On 6 February 2022, the Vietnam women's national football team qualified for the 2023 FIFA Women's World Cup for the first time.

In the 2021 Southeast Asian Games, as hosts, both the men's and women's football team successfully defended their gold medal title in front of home fans.

== Football culture in Vietnam ==
=== National identity ===
Football is an important part of the national identity in Vietnam. Although having a long history, modern Vietnamese football was developed very late than the rest, which only established at 1990s after the end of Sino-Vietnamese War and international isolation. Since 1990s, football has become extremely important for the society in Vietnam, regardless the rich or the poor. Despite ups and downs, football still plays a role on the rise of Vietnamese national identity, and often ties with its successes. Vietnam has some of the most passionate supporters in the world, often attend in large number anytime Vietnam plays in a major tournament. This has been witnessed in 2019 AFC Asian Cup, which its fans cooked traditional Vietnamese foods and even smuggled foods to the hotel to support its players.

=== Linking with nationalist sentiment ===
Vietnamese take pride on football heavily and in Vietnam, football is a God sport for the Vietnamese population in majority. When the national team won big matches, the streets are often overwhelmed by large Vietnamese crowds, demonstrating nationalist chants, singing Vietnamese nationalist songs.

According to the Bleacher Report, after the 2018 AFC U-23 Championship, they were totally astonished and shocked with the massive celebration of Vietnamese people.

== Women's football ==
The emergence of women's football in Vietnam was marked by the establishment of the Cai-Von Women's Football Team (Equipe Feminine de Cai-Von) in 1932, the first women's football team in Vietnam and Asia. Phan Khắc Sửu, an agricultural engineer, with the approval of the South Vietnam government and the Football General Bureau, came up with the idea of forming a women's team and gathered 30 young women to join the team, most of whom came from farming. At that time, it was extremely difficult to mobilize women to participate in football due to the constraints of feudal morality. The outstanding names of the Cai-Von team include Mười Kén, Út Thôi, Hai Tỉnh, Ba Triệu, Út Lẹo..., of which the most outstanding is the French striker Marguerite, who was later elected captain.

In the early days, the Cai-Von Women's Football Team often played against men's teams due to the lack of female opponents. The team's debut match against a men's team in Mỹ Thuận village attracted thousands of spectators; the football field (a rice field) was packed to capacity. After the match, the district chief of Trà Ôn came down to the field to present the team with 24 sets of jerseys and 2,000 Indochinese piasters to help the team develop further. Since then, the team has been invited to play in almost all the provinces in the Mekong Delta and sometimes up to Saigon, where men's football teams challenge; The number of supporters for the team has also increased over time.

Following the success of the first team, another women's team was founded in Cần Thơ, called the Xóm Chài team. July 2, 1933 marked the first time a match was played between the Cai-Von and Xóm Chài women's football teams. On July 30, 1933, the Cai-Von women's team tied 2-2 with the Paul Bert men's team (then the champion of the second division in Saigon) at Mayer Stadium, which was considered a feat. After that, the female players began to start families, and due to the lack of a successor, the team officially disbanded in 1938. At the same time as the Cai-Von women's team, there were also the Bà Trưng team in Rạch Giá - Long Xuyên and then the Huỳnh Ký and Thủ Dầu Một teams.

After a long period of stagnation, women's football in Vietnam was revived in the 1980s, first in Ho Chi Minh City. Nguyen Quoc Hung, then the chairman of Lam Son Football Club, founded the women's football team of District 5. He later became the head of the district's Department of Physical Education and Sports. In the early 1990s, the women's football team of District 1 was founded by Tran Thanh Ngu, the head of the District 1 Department of Physical Education and Sports; Tao Dan Stadium became the team's home ground. After the dissolution of the District 5 women's football team, the key players of that team joined Tran Thanh Ngu's women's team in District 1.

At the same time in the North, Hoang Vinh Giang, the then Director of the Hanoi Department of Physical Education and Sports, also invested in women's football in the capital. In 1992, the first generation of women's football players in Hanoi were selected to form a team called Hoa Hoc Tro (named after the newspaper that sponsored the team). In 1991, the Than Cua Ong team was formed in Quang Ninh under the leadership of former star Nguyen Dinh Hung B. In fact, the women's football movement in Quang Ninh was so strong that most coal mines in the province had women's teams that competed against each other and were all founded at the same time as the District 1 team (Ho Chi Minh City). In May 1994, on the sidelines of the 40th anniversary bicycle race commemorating the victory of Dien Bien Phu, a demonstration tournament between the three women's football teams of Hoa Hoc Tro, Than Cua Ong and District 1 was organized and received enthusiastic support from fans in the Northwest. This model was later applied to the "Back to the Roots" bicycle race in 1995.

In 1997, the Vietnam women's national football team was founded and immediately won the championship in the pre-SEA Games tournament in Malaysia. At the 19th SEA Games, the Vietnam women's team under the leadership of head coach Tran Thanh Ngu won the bronze medal. Since 2001, the women's team has won the SEA Games gold medal eight times, with the most recent being at the 32nd SEA Games.

The first Vietnamese Women's Football Championship was held in 1998 with 14 teams competing in the preliminary round to select 7 teams for the final round, which was held in Hanoi and Ha Tay.

== Competitions ==
=== FIFA World Cup ===
Vietnam had never qualified for any final round of FIFA World Cup tournaments.

=== AFC Asian Cup ===
Vietnam, as South Vietnam, finished in 4th place in both the 1956 and 1960 editions. However, there were only 4 teams in the final round of the tournament.

Since the return of Vietnam to international stage at 1991, Vietnam enjoyed a smaller level of success, but it has been noted for notable achievements during 2007 AFC Asian Cup as host, when Vietnam was the only host team to qualify to quarterfinals before losing to eventual winner Iraq. This also re-occurred in the 2019 AFC Asian Cup where Vietnam made the quarterfinals but lost to eventual runners up Japan.

AFC Asian Cup record									Qualification record					
Year	Result	Pld	W	D	L	GF	GA	Squad	Pld	W	D	L	GF	GA
as South Vietnam									as South Vietnam					
(Hong Kong) 1956	Fourth place	3	0	1	2	6	9	Squad	2	1	1	0	7	3
(South Korea) 1960	Fourth place	3	0	0	3	2	12	Squad	2	2	0	0	5	1
(Israel) 1964	Did not qualify								3	2	0	1	9	7
(Iran) 1968	Did not qualify								4	2	0	2	4	4
(Thailand) 1972	Withdrew								Withdrew					
(Iran) 1976	Did not qualify								4	0	0	4	1	10
as Vietnam									as Vietnam					
1980 to 1992	Did not enter								Did not enter					
(United Arab Emirates) 1996	Did not qualify								3	2	0	1	13	5
(Lebanon) 2000	Did not qualify								3	2	0	1	14	2
(China) 2004	Did not qualify								6	3	0	3	8	13
(Indonesia) (Malaysia) (Thailand) (Vietnam) 2007	Quarter-finals	4	1	1	2	4	7	Squad	Qualified as co-hosts					
(Qatar) 2011	Did not qualify								6	1	2	3	6	11
(Australia) 2015	Did not qualify								6	1	0	5	5	15
(United Arab Emirates) 2019	Quarter-finals	5	1	1	3	5	7	Squad	6	2	4	0	9	3
(Qatar) 2023	Group stage	3	0	0	3	4	8	Squad	8	5	2	1	13	5
(Saudi Arabia) 2027	Qualified								6	6	0	0	17	2
Total	Quarter-finals	12	2	2	8	13	22	—	36	16	6	14	72	51

=== ASEAN Championship ===
ASEAN Championship record									Coach(es)
Year	Result	Pos.	Pld	W	D	L	GF	GA	—
(Singapore) 1996	Third place	3rd	6	3	2	1	14	10	(Germany) Karl-Heinz Weigang
(Vietnam) 1998	Runners-up	2/8	5	3	1	1	8	2	Alfred Riedl
(Thailand) 2000	Fourth place	4th	6	3	1	2	14	6	(Austria) Alfred Riedl
(Indonesia) (Singapore) 2002	Third place	3rd	6	4	1	1	21	12	(Portugal) Henrique Calisto
(Malaysia) (Vietnam) 2004	Group stage	6th	4	2	1	1	13	5	(Brazil) Edson Tavares, (Vietnam) Trần Văn Khánh
(Singapore) (Thailand) 2007	Semi-finals	3rd	5	1	3	1	10	3	(Austria) Alfred Riedl
(Indonesia) (Thailand) 2008	Champions	1/8	7	4	2	1	11	6	(Portugal) Henrique Calisto
(Indonesia) (Vietnam) 2010	Semi-finals	3rd	5	2	1	2	8	5	(Portugal) Henrique Calisto
(Malaysia) (Thailand) 2012	Group stage	6th	3	0	1	2	2	5	(Vietnam) Phan Thanh Hùng
(Singapore) (Vietnam) 2014	Semi-finals	3/8	5	3	1	1	12	8	(Japan) Toshiya Miura
(Myanmar) (Philippines) 2016	Semi-finals	3rd	5	3	1	1	8	6	(Vietnam) Nguyễn Hữu Thắng
(ASEAN) 2018	Champions	1/10	8	6	2	0	15	4	(South Korea) Park Hang-seo
(Singapore) 2020	Semi-finals	3/10	6	3	2	1	9	2	(South Korea) Park Hang-seo
(ASEAN) 2022	Runners-up	2nd	8	4	3	1	16	3	(South Korea) Park Hang-seo
(ASEAN) 2024	Champions	1st	8	7	1	0	21	6	(South Korea) Kim Sang-sik
Total	3 titles	15/15	84	45	23	16	182	82	—

== Teams ==
=== Men ===
- Vietnam National Football Team
- Vietnam National Under-23 Football Team
- Vietnam National Under-21 Football Team
- Vietnam National Under-20 Football Team
- Vietnam National Under-17 Football Team

=== Women ===
- Vietnam Women's National Football Team
- Vietnam Women's National Under-20 Football Team
- Vietnam Women's National Under-17 Football Team

== Domestic leagues ==
=== Men ===
Correct for 2025/26 season.

Level	Division
I	V.League 1; 14 clubs
	↓↑ 1 club
II	V.League 2; 12 clubs
	↓↑ 3 clubs
III	National Second Division; 14 clubs
	↓↑ 4 clubs
III	National Third Division; 17 clubs

Other leagues for men include:

- Vietnamese National U-21 Football Championship
- Vietnamese National U-19 Football Championship
- Vietnamese National U-17 Football Championship
- Vietnamese National U-15 Football Championship
- Vietnamese National Youth Football Championship
- Vietnamese National Junior Football Championship
- Vietnamese National Futsal League
- Vietnamese National Beach Soccer League

=== Women ===
Level	Division
I	Women's National League; 8 clubs

Other leagues for women include:

- Vietnamese National Women's U-19 Football Championship
- Vietnamese National Women's U-16 Football Championship
- Vietnamese Women's Futsal Championship

== Domestic cups ==
- Vietnamese National Football Cup
- Vietnamese National Football Super Cup
- Vietnamese Women's National Cup

== International tournaments ==
- Ho Chi Minh City Cup
- VTV-T&T Cup
- VFF Cup
- Thanh Niên Newspaper Cup
- BTV Cup

== Asian and Southeast Asian eligibility ==
Uniquely, Vietnam has three chances to acquire Asian and ASEAN gold, as the V.League 1 winner is eligible for AFC Champions League Elite preliminary stage and ASEAN Club Championship group stage, runner-up qualifies for AFC Champions League Two group stage, while the Vietnamese Cup winner goes to the group stage of ASEAN Club Championship.

== Stadiums in Vietnam by capacity ==
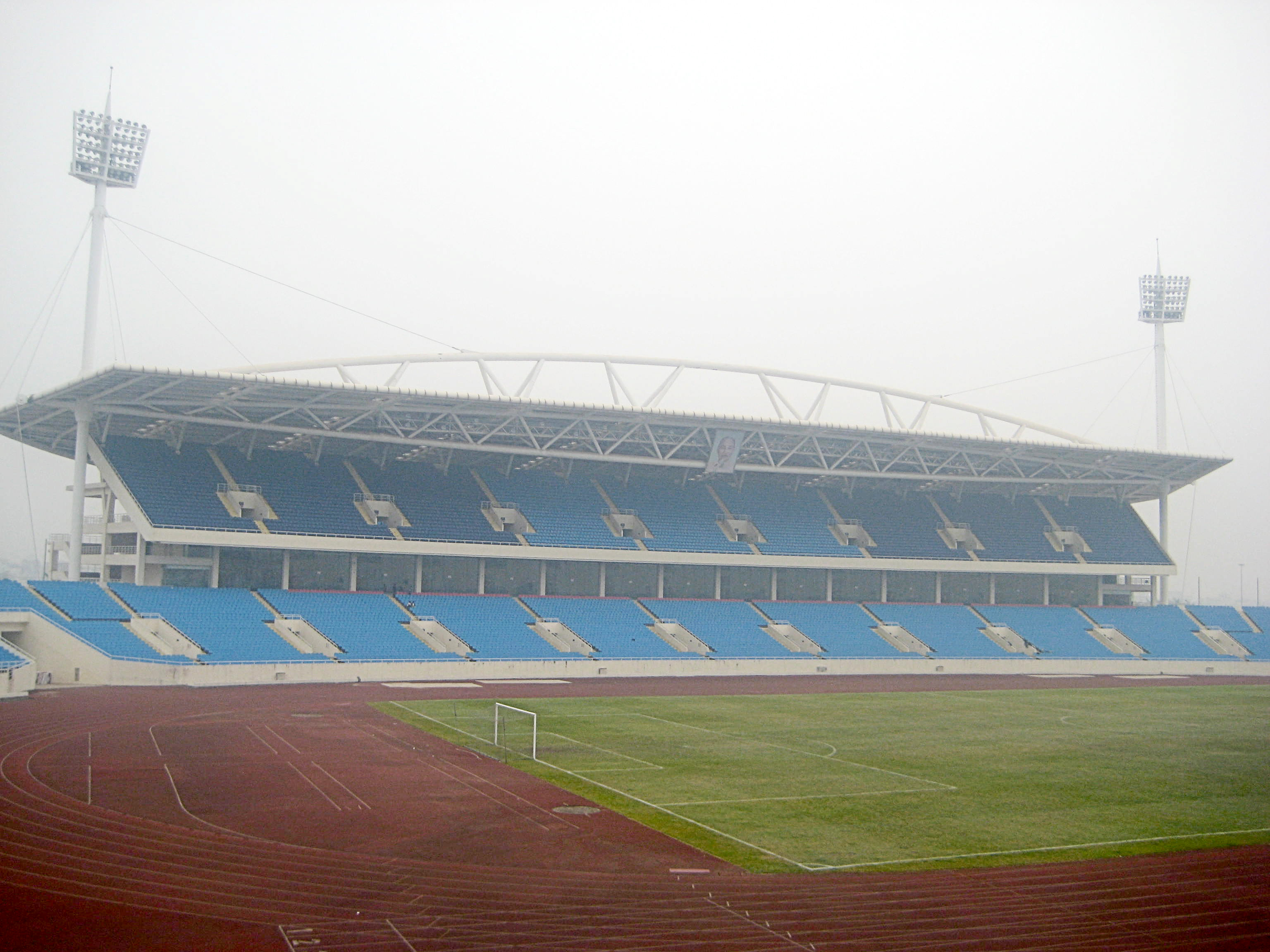
Mỹ Đình National Stadium

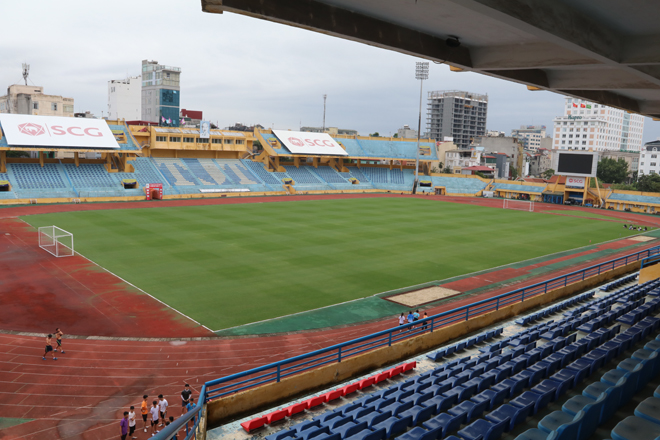
Hàng Đẫy Stadium

Team	Location	Stadium	Capacity
Vietnam	Hanoi	Mỹ Đình National Stadium	40,192
Can Tho FC	Cần Thơ	Cần Thơ Stadium	30,000
Hong Linh Ha Tinh	Ha Tinh	Ha Tinh	30,000
Hanoi FC, Viettel	Hanoi	Hang Day	22,500
Công An Nhân Dân	Ninh Bình	Ninh Binh	22,000
SHB Danang	Danang	Hoa Xuan	20,000
Long An	Tân An	Long An	20,000
Song Lam Nghe An	Nghe An	Vinh	18,000
Khánh Hòa	Nha Trang	18/9	18,000
Ho Chi Minh City FC, Saigon FC	Ho Chi Minh City	Thong Nhat	16,000
Huế	Huế	Tự Do	16,000
Topenland Binh Dinh	Binh Dinh	Quy Nhon	15,000
Quảng Nam	Tam Kỳ	Tam Kỳ	15,000
Becamex Binh Duong	Binh Duong	Go Dau	13,035
Hoang Anh Gia Lai	Gia Lai	Pleiku	12,000
Dong A Thanh Hoa	Thanh Hoa	Thanh Hoa	12,000
Triệu Minh	Bến Tre	Bến Tre	9,000
Binh Thuan FC	Bình Thuận	Phan Thiet	6,000

== Support ==
=== Polling ===
Most popular European football clubs in Vietnam (Ganassa, 2019–2020)
Club	%
(Italy) AC Milan	1.1%
(England) Arsenal	11.8%
(Spain) Barcelona	12.0%
(Germany) Bayern Munich	1.5%
(Germany) Borussia Dortmund	0.7%
(England) Chelsea	13.3%
(Italy) Inter Milan	0.4%
(Italy) Juventus	6.7%
(England) Liverpool	10.3%
(England) Manchester City	5.0%
(England) Manchester United	25.2%
(France) Paris Saint-Germain	0.6%
(Spain) Real Madrid	8.0%
(Italy) Roma	0.4%
(England) Tottenham Hotspur	1.6%
Other	1.4%

Most popular European football leagues in Vietnam (Ganassa, 2019–2020)
League	%
(Spain) La Liga	20.1%
(England) Premier League	67.7%
(Italy) Serie A	8.5%

== Attendances ==
The average attendance per top-flight football league season and the club with the highest average attendance:

Season	League average	Best club	Best club average
2024-25	5,192	Nam Định	11,038
2023-24	5,890	Nam Định	13,230

Sources: League pages on Wikipedia

== See also ==
- Vietnam national football team
- North Vietnam national football team
- South Vietnam national football team
- Sport in Vietnam
- Vietnam Football Federation
- List of association football competitions
- List of football clubs in Vietnam
- List of foreign footballers in Vietnam
- List of football stadiums in Vietnam
