= 2026 Vietnamese Women's National Cup =

Tournament details
- Country: Vietnam
- Dates: 13–27 May
- Teams: 6

Final positions
- Champions: Ho Chi Minh City (5th title)
- Runners-up: Hanoi I
- Third place: Thai Nguyen T&T

Tournament statistics
- Matches played: 11
- Goals scored: 26 (2.36 per match)
- Top goal scorer(s): (Vietnam) Cao Thị Linh (3 goals)

The 2026 Vietnamese Women's National Cup (Vietnamese: Giải bóng đá Nữ Cúp Quốc gia 2026, lit. '2026 Women's National Cup') was the 8th season of the Vietnamese Women's National Cup, a cup competition for women's football teams in Vietnam. All 6 clubs competed in this edition.

The tournament took place from 13 to 27 May 2026.

The group stage draw was held at 10:00 ICT on 15 April 2026.

Ho Chi Minh City are the defending champions, having beaten Thai Nguyen T&T 1–0 in the 2025 final, they later won their 5th title after winning Hanoi I 3–0 by penalties after 0–0 draw.

== Teams ==
6 teams in the Vietnamese Women's National League participate in the tournament. The two other teams in league Hồ Chí Minh City II and Sơn La did not enter the tournament.

Location of the 2026 Vietnamese Women's National Cup venue

=== Stadiums and locations ===
The tournament was held in a centralized venue at the Thái Nguyên Stadium, located in Phúc Trìu commune of Thái Nguyên province.

== Format ==
The format follows by the group stage, the top two teams will advance for the knockout stage, 3rd-placed teams advanced to the 5th place play-off. Additionally in the knockout stage, if the teams ends the match with a tie, then the winner will be decided by a penalty shoot-out.

== Group stage ==
Tie-breaking criteria for group play
The ranking of teams in the group stage is determined as follows:
1. Points obtained in all group matches;
2. Points obtained in the matches played between the teams in question;
3. Goal difference in the matches played between the teams in question;
4. Number of goals scored in the matches played between the teams in question;
5. Goal difference in all group matches;
6. Number of goals scored in all group matches;
7. Fair play points in all group matches (only one deduction can be applied to a player or coach in a single match):
  - Yellow card: −1 points;
  - Indirect red card (second yellow card): −3 points;
  - Direct red card: −4 points;
  - Yellow card and direct red card: −5 points;
8. If the points are still equal, the Organizing Committee will organize a draw to confirm the rankings of the teams.

=== Group A ===
Pos	Team	Pld	W	D	L	GF	GA	GD	Pts	Qualification
1	Thai Nguyen T&T	2	1	1	0	9	1	+8	4	Advance to knockout stage
2	Phong Phu Ha Nam	2	1	1	0	5	1	+4	4	Advance to knockout stage
3	Hanoi II	2	0	0	2	0	12	−12	0	Advance to 5th place play-offs

Source: VFF
Rules for classification: Group stage tiebreakers
13 May 2026
19:00

Thai Nguyen T&T	8–0	Hanoi II
Nguyễn Thị Thúy Hằng 8', 50'; Nguyễn Thị Bích Thùy 42', 46'; Nguyễn Thị Vạn 59'; Lò Thị Hoài 79'; Vũ Thị Huyền 87' (o.g.); Trần Thị Nhung 90+1'	Report

Thái Nguyên Stadium, Thái Nguyên
Referee: Nguyễn Thị Thuỳ Hương

16 May 2026
16:00

Hanoi II	0–4	Phong Phu Ha Nam
	Report	Vũ Thị Hoa 26'; Cao Thị Linh 39', 45+3'; Nguyễn Thị Hồng Huế 82'

Thái Nguyên Stadium, Thái Nguyên
Referee: Nguyễn Thị Mỹ Thương

19 May 2026
19:00

Phong Phu Ha Nam	1–1	Thai Nguyen T&T
Cao Thị Linh 81'	Report	Ngọc Minh Chuyên 45+1'

Thái Nguyên Stadium, Thái Nguyên
Referee: Lê Thị Thanh Mai

=== Group B ===
Pos	Team	Pld	W	D	L	GF	GA	GD	Pts	Qualification
1	Ho Chi Minh City	2	2	0	0	4	1	+3	6	Advance to knockout stage
2	Hanoi I	2	0	1	1	1	2	−1	1	Advance to knockout stage
3	Than KSVN	2	0	1	1	0	2	−2	1	Advance to 5th place play-offs

Source: VFF
Rules for classification: Group stage tiebreakers
13 May 2026
16:00

Ho Chi Minh City	2–1	Hanoi I
Joelma 27' (pen.); Huỳnh Như 52'	Report	Phạm Hải Yến 74'

Thái Nguyên Stadium, Thái Nguyên
Referee: Bùi Thị Thu Trang

16 May 2026
19:00

Hanoi I	0–0	Than KSVN
	Report

Thái Nguyên Stadium, Thái Nguyên
Referee: Lê Thị Thanh Mai

19 May 2026
16:00

Than KSVN	0–2	Ho Chi Minh City
	Report	Phan Thị Trang 10'; Trần Thị Thu Xuân 45+2'

Thái Nguyên Stadium, Thái Nguyên
Referee: Lưu Việt Hùng

== Knockout stage ==
In the knockout stage, if the scores are equal when normal playing time expires, a penalty shoot-out to determine the winners.

=== Bracket ===
Semi-finals
23 May
Thai Nguyen T&T	0 (2)
Hanoi I	0 (4)
23 May
Ho Chi Minh City	2 (3)
Phong Phu Ha Nam	2 (0)

Final
27 May
Hanoi I	0 (0)
Ho Chi Minh City	0 (3)
Third place play-off
27 May
Thai Nguyen T&T	1
Phong Phu Ha Nam	0

Fifth place play-off
22 May
Hanoi II	1 (5)
Than KSVN	1 (4)

=== Fifth place play-off ===
22 May 2026
16:00

Hanoi II	1–1	Than KSVN
Lê Thị Bảo Trâm 47' (o.g.)	Report	Trần Thị Thu Phương 87'
Penalties
Đặng Thanh Thảo (penalty scored); Hà Huyền Mai (penalty scored); An Hoàng Cúc (penalty scored); Vũ Thị Huyền (penalty missed); Lý Linh Trang (penalty scored); Mai Thị Anh Đào (penalty scored)	5–4	(penalty scored) Nguyễn Thị Trúc Hương; (penalty scored) Hà Thị Nhài; (penalty scored) Nguyễn Thị Thúy; (penalty missed) Nguyễn Thị Như Quỳnh; (penalty scored) Lê Thị Bảo Trâm; (penalty missed) Phạm Thị Nhâm

Thái Nguyên Stadium, Thái Nguyên
Referee: Nguyễn Thị Mỹ Thương

=== Semi-finals ===
23 May 2026
16:00

Ho Chi Minh City	2–2	Phong Phu Ha Nam
Trần Thị Thu Thảo 45+1'; Ngô Thị Hồng Nhung 80'	Report	Trần Thị Lan Anh 39'; Vũ Thị Hoa 40'
Penalties
Ngô Thị Hồng Nhung (penalty missed); Trần Thị Thùy Trang (penalty scored); Trần Thị Thu Xuân (penalty scored); Huỳnh Như (penalty scored)	3–0	(penalty missed) Trần Thị Duyên; (penalty missed) Vũ Thị Hoa; (penalty missed) Nguyễn Phương Anh

Thái Nguyên Stadium, Thái Nguyên
Referee: Nguyễn Thị Thùy Hương

23 May 2026
19:00

Thai Nguyen T&T	0–0	Hanoi I
	Report
Penalties
Nguyễn Thị Vạn (penalty missed); Lake (penalty scored); Nguyễn Thị Mỹ Anh (penalty missed); Ngọc Minh Chuyên (penalty scored)	2–4	(penalty scored) Phạm Hải Yến; (penalty scored) Thái Thị Thảo; (penalty scored) Hoàng Thị Loan; (penalty scored) Nguyễn Thị Hằng

Thái Nguyên Stadium, Thái Nguyên
Referee: Lê Thị Thanh Mai

=== Third place play-off ===
27 May 2026
16:00

Thai Nguyen T&T	1–0	Phong Phu Ha Nam
Ngọc Minh Chuyên 49'	Report

Thái Nguyên Stadium, Thái Nguyên
Referee: Lưu Việt Hùng

=== Final ===
27 May 2026
19:00

Hanoi I	0–0	Ho Chi Minh City
	Report
Penalties
Hoàng Thị Loan (penalty missed); Nguyễn Thị Hằng (penalty missed); Ngân Thị Vạn Sự (penalty missed)	0–3	Ngô Thị Hồng Nhung (penalty scored); Trần Thị Thu Xuân (penalty missed); Trần Thị Thùy Trang (penalty scored); Huỳnh Như (penalty scored)

Thái Nguyên Stadium, Thái Nguyên
Referee: Bùi Thị Thu Trang

== Champions ==
Vietnamese Women's National Cup
2026 Winners
Hồ Chí Minh City
Fifth title

== Awards ==
The following awards were given at the end of the tournament.

Fair-play award
Thai Nguyen T&T
Best player	Best goalkeeper
Thái Thị Thảo; Hanoi I	Trần Thị Kim Thanh; Thái Nguyên T&T
Top goalscorer(s)
Cao Thị Linh; Phong Phú Hà Nam

== Goalscorers ==
There were 26 goals scored in 11 matches, for an average of 2.36 goals per match.

3 goals

- (Vietnam) Cao Thị Linh

2 goals

- (Vietnam) Nguyễn Thị Thúy Hằng
- (Vietnam) Nguyễn Thị Bích Thùy
- (Vietnam) Vũ Thị Hoa
- (Vietnam) Ngọc Minh Chuyên

1 goal

- (Brazil) Joelma Church
- (Vietnam) Huỳnh Như
- (Vietnam) Phan Thị Trang
- (Vietnam) Trần Thị Thu Xuân
- (Vietnam) Phạm Hải Yến
- (Vietnam) Nguyễn Thị Vạn
- (Vietnam) Lò Thị Hoài
- (Vietnam) Trần Thị Nhung
- (Vietnam) Nguyễn Thị Hồng Huế
- (Vietnam) Trần Thị Thu Phương
- (Vietnam) Trần Thị Lan Anh
- (Vietnam) Ngô Thị Hồng Nhung
- (Vietnam) Trần Thị Thu Thảo

1 own goal

- (Vietnam) Vũ Thị Huyền (against Thai Nguyen T&T)
- (Vietnam) Lê Thị Bảo Trâm (against Hanoi II)
