= Tây Sơn (disambiguation) =

- Tây Sơn, Đắk Lắk, a commune of Đắk Lắk province
- Tây Sơn, Gia Lai, a commune of Gia Lai province
- Tây Sơn district, a former district of Bình Định province
- Tây Sơn dynasty
- Tây Sơn wars
- Tây Sơn military tactics and organization
