= 2025 Vietnamese Women's National Cup =

Tournament details
- Country: Vietnam
- Dates: 25 March – 6 April
- Teams: 6

Final positions
- Champions: Ho Chi Minh City
- Runners-up: Thái Nguyên T&T
- Third place: Phong Phú Hà Nam

Tournament statistics
- Matches played: 11
- Goals scored: 28 (2.55 per match)
- Top goal scorer(s): Nguyễn Thị Bích Thùy; Trần Thị Thùy Trang; Huỳnh Như (3 goals each)

The 2025 Vietnamese Women's National Cup (Vietnamese: Giải bóng đá Nữ Cúp Quốc gia 2025) was the 7th season of the Vietnamese Women's National Cup, a cup competition for women's football teams in Vietnam. All 6 clubs were competed in this edition.

The tournament took place from 25 March to 6 April 2025.

Than Khoáng Sản Việt Nam were the two-time defending champions, but got eliminated by eventual winners Ho Chi Minh City in the semi-finals.

== Teams ==
6 teams in the Vietnamese Women's National League participate in the tournament. The two other teams in league Hà Nội II and Hồ Chí Minh City II did not enter the tournament.

Location of the 2025 Vietnamese Women's National Cup venues

=== Stadiums and locations ===
The tournament is held in a centralized venue like previous seasons, at the Vietnam Youth Football Training Center, located in the Nam Từ Liêm district of Hanoi

== Format ==
The format follows by the group stage, the top two teams will advance for the knockout stage, 3rd-placed teams advanced to the 5th place play-off. Additionally in the knockout stage, if the teams ends the match with a tie, then the winner will be decided by a penalty shoot-out.

== Group stage ==
All times are local, ICT (UTC+7).

Tie-breaking criteria for group play
The ranking of teams in the group stage is determined as follows:
1. Points obtained in all group matches;
2. Points obtained in the matches played between the teams in question;
3. Goal difference in the matches played between the teams in question;
4. Number of goals scored in the matches played between the teams in question;
5. Goal difference in all group matches;
6. Number of goals scored in all group matches;
7. Fair play points in all group matches (only one deduction can be applied to a player or coach in a single match):
  - Yellow card: −1 points;
  - Indirect red card (second yellow card): −3 points;
  - Direct red card: −4 points;
  - Yellow card and direct red card: −5 points;
8. If the points are still equal, the Organizing Committee will organize a draw to confirm the rankings of the teams.

=== Group A ===
Pos	Team	Pld	W	D	L	GF	GA	GD	Pts	Qualification
1	Ho Chi Minh City	2	1	1	0	5	0	+5	4	Advance to knockout stage
2	Thai Nguyen T&T	2	1	1	0	4	0	+4	4	Advance to knockout stage
3	Son La	2	0	0	2	0	9	−9	0	Advance to 5th place play-offs

Source: VFF
Rules for classification: Group stage tiebreakers
25 March 2025
15:30

Thai Nguyen T&T	4–0	Son La
Lê Hoài Lương 74'; Nguyễn Thị Bích Thùy 78', 83', 90+2'	Report

Vietnam Youth Football Training Center, Hanoi
Referee: Lê Thị Thanh Mai

28 March 2025
15:30

Son La	0–5	Ho Chi Minh City
	Report	Nguyễn Thị Tâm 23' (o.g.); Trần Thị Thùy Trang 68', 90+2'; Trần Nguyễn Bảo Châu 74'; Chelsea Le 79'

Vietnam Youth Football Training Center, Hanoi
Referee: Nguyễn Thị Thuỳ Hương

31 March 2025
15:30

Ho Chi Minh City	0–0	Thai Nguyen T&T
	Report

Vietnam Youth Football Training Center, Hanoi
Referee: Dương Duy Dũng

=== Group B ===
Pos	Team	Pld	W	D	L	GF	GA	GD	Pts	Qualification
1	Phong Phú Hà Nam	2	1	1	0	2	0	+2	4	Advance to knockout stage
2	Than KSVN	2	0	2	0	1	1	0	2	Advance to knockout stage
3	Hanoi	2	0	1	1	1	3	−2	1	Advance to 5th place play-offs

Source: VFF
Rules for classification: Group stage tiebreakers
25 March 2025
15:30

Than KSVN	0–0	Phong Phú Hà Nam
	Report

Vietnam Youth Football Training Center, Hanoi
Referee: Bùi Thị Thu Trang

28 March 2025
15:30

Phong Phú Hà Nam	2–0	Hà Nội
Cao Thị Linh 4'; Ngân Thị Thanh Hiếu 43'	Report

Vietnam Youth Football Training Center, Hanoi
Referee: Lê Quang Cường

31 March 2025
15:30

Hà Nội	1–1	Than KSVN
Đặng Thị Duyên 10'	Report	Nguyễn Thị Vạn 18'

Vietnam Youth Football Training Center, Hanoi
Referee: Bùi Thị Thu Trang

== Knockout stage ==
In the knockout stage, if the scores are equal when normal playing time expires, a penalty shoot-out to determine the winners.

=== Bracket ===
Semi-finals
3 April – Hanoi
Ho Chi Minh City	5
Than KSVN	0
3 April – Hanoi
Phong Phú Hà Nam	1
Thai Nguyen T&T	2

Final
6 April – Hanoi
Ho Chi Minh City	1
Thai Nguyen T&T	0
Third place play-off
6 April – Hanoi
Than KSVN	0 (4)
Phong Phú Hà Nam (p)	0 (5)

Fifth place play-off
3 April - Hanoi
Son La	0
Hanoi	6

=== Semi-finals ===
3 April 2025
15:30

Ho Chi Minh City	5–0	Than KSVN
Chelsea Le 15'; Huỳnh Như 50', 57'; Trần Thị Thùy Trang 66'; K'Thủa 90'	Report

Vietnam Youth Football Training Center, Hanoi
3 April 2025
18:00

Phong Phú Hà Nam	1–2	Thai Nguyen T&T
Nguyễn Thị Tuyết Dung 18'	Report	Ngọc Minh Chuyên 45+5'; Nguyễn Thị Hồng Huế 81' (o.g.)

Vietnam Youth Football Training Center, Hanoi

=== Fifth place play-off ===
3 April 2025
15:30

Son La	0–6	Hanoi
	Report	Biện Thị Hằng 5', 23'; Đặng Thanh Thảo 46', 86'; Đặng Thị Duyên 56'; Nguyễn Thị Thanh Nhã 70'

Vietnam Youth Football Training Center, Hanoi

=== Third place play-off ===
6 April 2025
15:30

Than KSVN	0–0	Phong Phú Hà Nam
	Report
Penalties
Nguyễn Thị Vạn (penalty scored); Trần Thu Xuân (penalty scored); Nguyễn Thị Hải Yến (penalty scored); Phan Thị Thu Thìn (penalty missed); Nguyễn Thị Thúy (penalty scored); Dương Thị Vân (penalty missed); Trần Thị Lan Mai (penalty missed)	4–5	Trần Thị Duyên (penalty scored); Vũ Thị Hoa (penalty missed); Nguyễn Phương Thảo (penalty scored); Trần Thị Lan Anh (penalty scored); Lê Hồng Yêu (penalty scored); Đào Thị Ngân (penalty missed); Ngân Thị Thanh Hiếu (penalty scored)

Vietnam Youth Football Training Center, Hanoi

=== Final ===
6 April 2025
18:00

Ho Chi Minh City	1–0	Thai Nguyen T&T
Huỳnh Như 38' (pen.)	Report

Vietnam Youth Football Training Center, Hanoi
Referee: Bùi Thị Thu Trang

== Champions ==
Vietnamese Women's National Cup
2025 Winners
Hồ Chí Minh City
Fourth title

== Awards ==
The following awards were given at the end of the tournament.

Fair-play award
Ho Chi Minh City
Best Player		Best Goalkeeper
Nguyễn Thị Bích Thùy; Thái Nguyên T&T		Trần Thị Kim Thanh; Thái Nguyên T&T
Top goalscorer(s)
Nguyễn Thị Bích Thùy; Thái Nguyên T&T	Huỳnh Như; Hồ Chí Minh City	Trần Thị Thùy Trang; Hồ Chí Minh City

== Tournament statistics ==
=== Goalscorers ===
There were 28 goals scored in 13 matches, for an average of 2.15 goals per match.

3 goals

- Huỳnh Như
- Nguyễn Thị Bích Thùy
- Trần Thị Thùy Trang

2 goals

- Biện Thị Hằng
- Đặng Thanh Thảo
- Đặng Thị Duyên
- (United States) Chelsea Le

1 goal

- K'Thủa
- Lê Hoài Lương
- Ngọc Minh Chuyên
- Nguyễn Thị Thanh Nhã
- Nguyễn Thị Tuyết Dung
- Nguyễn Thị Vạn
- Trần Nguyễn Bảo Châu

1 own goal

- Nguyễn Thị Hồng Huế
- Nguyễn Thị Tâm

Source: VFF
