= Trần Quốc Tuấn =

Trần Quốc Tuấn or Tran Quoc Tuan may refer to:

- Trần Hưng Đạo (1228–1300), a royal prince, statesman and military commander of Đại Việt military forces.
- Trần Quốc Tuấn (football administrator) (born 1971), Vietnamese football administrator, currently serving as the Vietnam Football Federation president since 2021.
