= Phú Phong =

Phú Phong may refer to several places in Vietnam, including:

- Phú Phong, Bình Định, a township and capital of Tây Sơn District.
- Phú Phong, Hà Tĩnh, a rural commune of Hương Khê District.
- Phú Phong, Tiền Giang, a rural commune of Châu Thành District.
