= Chelsea Le =

American soccer player (born 2001)

Personal information
- Full name: Chelsea Lien Le
- Date of birth: September 14, 2001 (age 25)
- Place of birth: Seattle, United States
- Height: 1.68 m (5 ft 6 in)
- Position: Midfielder

Team information
- Current team: León
- Number: 12

Youth career
- Gonzaga Prep

College career
Years	Team	Apps	(Gls)
2023–2024	Gonzaga Bulldogs	37	(8)

Senior career*
Years	Team	Apps	(Gls)
2025	Hồ Chí Minh City	4	(2)
2025–	León	26	(3)
- * Club domestic league appearances and goals as of 2 August 2026

Chelsea Lien Le (born September 14, 2001) is an American professional soccer player who plays as a midfielder for Liga Femenil club León.

== Career ==
Le played college soccer for the Gonzaga Bulldogs. She trained with the Vietnam under-20 team for the 2019 AFC U-19 Women's Championship but was not eligible to play as she did not have Vietnamese citizenship.

In March 2025, Le joined Hồ Chí Minh City on a short-term deal and played an important role in helping the club reach the AFC Women's Champions League semifinals and win the Vietnamese Women's National Cup.

In August of the same year, she moved to play for Mexican side León.

== Personal life ==
Le is Vietnamese on her father's side and American on her mother's side.

== Honors and awards ==
Hồ Chí Minh City

- Vietnamese Women's National Cup: 2025

Individual

- WCC Co-Midfielder of the Year: 2024
- Second-team All-WCC: 2023, 2024
