= Mancons Saigon FC =

Vietnamese football club

Mancons Saigon
- Full name: Câu lạc bộ bóng đá Mancons Sài Gòn
- Founded: 2001; 25 years ago
- Dissolved: 2018; 8 years ago
- Stadium: Thống Nhất Stadium
- Capacity: 14,400
- Owner(s): Binh Thanh District Construction and Project Management Company
- League: Vietnamese Second Division
- 2017: 4th (Group B)
- Website: Official website
Home colours	Away colours

Mancons Saigon FC (Vietnamese: Câu lạc bộ bóng đá Mancons Sài Gòn) was a football club based in Ho Chi Minh City, Vietnam. It last played in the 2017 Vietnamese Second Division. The club's home ground was the Thống Nhất Stadium.

== History ==
Mancons Saigon was founded in 2001 by Trần Nguyên Hùng as an unprofessional club. In 2013, Saigon won the Ho Chi Minh City A-League and get the chance to be a professional club and play in the Third Division.

In the 2014 Vietnamese Third Division, Saigon got first in the group with 12 points, won the league right in the first season. In the 2015 Second Division, they ranked 3rd in the group B, which almost get them to the First Division. In December 2015, Saigon appointed former footballer Phan Thanh Bình as the head manager.

In the 2018 Second Division, Vietnam Football Federation (VFF) staff said that because Saigon wanted to reserve its second-class spot, which is not allowed, and until the opening day of the tournament, the club had not completed the registration procedures, so VFF was forced to eliminate this team from the tournament. Which also mean the league's rules have to change, from having one relegated team to none. Saigon also announced to withdraw from the league, play again when VFF "organize the league better".

== Honours ==
=== Domestic ===
- Third Division: 2014

== See also ==
- List of football clubs in Vietnam
