= Fabio Lopez =

Italian football coach (born 1973)

Personal information
- Date of birth: 17 June 1973 (age 53)
- Place of birth: Rome, Italy
- Position: Goalkeeper

Senior career*
Years	Team	Apps	(Gls)
1991–1993	Agiatese F.C.	48	(0)
- Atalanta B.C. (scout)
- 2005–2007: ACF Fiorentina (scout)
- 2007–2008: FK Banga Gargždai
- 2008–2009: FK Šiauliai
- 2010–2011: Sabah FA
- 2011–2012: PSMS Medan
- 2013–2014: B.G. Sports Club
- 2015–2016: Bangladesh
- 2016: Al-Orouba SC
- 2016–2017: Al-Ahli Saudi FC
- 2017–2018: Al-Ahli Saudi FC
- 2019: Borneo FC
- 2019–2020: Thanh Hóa
- 2024–2025: Pretoria Callies
- 2025–: FC Fassell
- * Club domestic league appearances and goals

Fabio Lopez (born 17 June 1973) is an Italian football manager of Spanish descent and a former footballer. Lopez has coached many Italian academy clubs, scouted for Atalanta B.C. and ACF Fiorentina, and managed a number of clubs throughout Eastern Europe and Asia. He holds a UEFA Pro Coaching Licence.

Lopez's first senior managerial role was at FK Banga Gargždai, starting in January 2007. He is known for his strong leadership qualities, his ability to analyse and solve problems and his excellent interpersonal and communication skills with players.

He was the head coach of Vietnamese club Thanh Hóa from 22 November 2019 until 7 June 2020. He was most recently coach of Liberian First Division club FC Fassell.

== Playing career ==
A goalkeeper, Lopez started his playing career in the academy of A.S. Roma. Ultimately, he was forced into early retirement as a result of a serious knee injury picked up while playing with Agiatese in the 1992–93 season.

== Early years ==
Lopez graduated secondary school with a diploma in Rome. After retiring as a footballer, he went on to become a football coach for a number of semi-professional club and youth teams. At age 28, he won a Youth Cup in an international tournament in Umbria, coaching Roma's affiliate academy side. He obtained his UEFA Youth Coaching Licence in 2000.

== Coaching career ==
=== Eurolimpia A.S. Roma Academy ===
In 1996, Lopez joined the youth coaching staff at Eurolimpia Roma (Affiliate Academy A.S. Roma) as a goalkeeper coach of the academy. In March 2007, Lopez obtained a UEFA A coaching licence (Italy second category licence), which made him eligible to work as head coach of many international leagues and clubs. Since then, he has completed further coaching qualifications, and now holds a UEFA Pro Licence.

=== A.S. Roma Academy ===
In 2000, Lopez was hired by Roma's youth academy side. Roma won a provincial championship and three regional tournaments, with many members of the side going on to successful senior careers in Italy.

=== FK Banga Gargždai ===
In the 2007–08 season, Lopez was approached by Lithuanian club FK Banga Gargždai as to take over as head coach (for the first time in his career). The season was very successful as the club reached cup the semi-finals and recorded the best defensive record in the league, conceding only 15 goals all season while suffering only 6 defeats. In 2008, he was an instructor of the UEFA B course for the Lithuanian Football Federation.

=== FK Šiauliai ===
In the 2008–09 season, after success with FK Banga Gargždai, Lopez was hired by FC Siauliai. The club finished in fourth place in the league, in a season that included a record 11 consecutive games unbeaten.

=== Sabah FA ===
In 2011, Lopez was approached by Sabah FA in Malaysia's Liga Premier competition to become their manager, however the club ultimately appointed him as technical director. After eight months, Lopez resigned from the role and moved to Indonesia where he coached Premier League club, PSMS Medan.

=== PSMS Medan ===
In 2012, Lopez saved the team from relegation with two games in advance. The club occupied a lowly league position upon his arrival, however he was able to secure safety by changing the mentality of the team.

=== B.G. Sports Club ===
Lopez was then hired by Maldivian Premier League side B.G. Sports Club. Like his previous club, PSMS Madan, B.G. were also in a poor league position at the time of Lopez's arrival, their first 4 games all ending in defeat. After a series of important positive results, the team reached third place by the end of the season, which was considered a great success.

=== Bangladesh national team ===
On 11 September 2015 Lopez was hired by the Bangladesh national team, He was hired with a short 4-month contract only for the qualifying matches at the 2018 World Cup in Russia

=== Al-Orouba SC ===
Lopez's next role was at Omani club Al-Orouba SC, however once again his time was cut short, this time due to 'a difference in philosophy between the manager and the board'.

=== Al-Ahli under 23s ===
After a 6-month coaching hiatus, Lopez returned to the managerial world by taking up a position as under 23s coach for Al-Ahli. Lying in 6th position at the time of his takeover, the club has registered 9 consecutive wins since his arrival, reaching the record of 7 victories without ever suffering a goal, taking them up to 2nd on the ladder.

=== Borneo FC ===
On 5 January 2018 Lopez was hired as the new coach of Indonesian Liga 1 club Borneo FC, replacing Dejan Antonic. On 23 April 2019, he terminated his contract binding him to his employer by mutual consent of both parties.

=== Thanh Hóa Football Club ===
On 22 November 2019 Lopez was hired as the new coach of Vietnamese club Thanh Hóa. After got only one win and four loss in the first five-game, he was sacked on 7 June 2020.

== Scouting career ==
=== Atalanta B.C. ===
In 2003, Lopez became a scout for Atalanta B.C, where he remained until 2005.

=== ACF Fiorentina ===
In 2005, Lopez moved from Atalanta to become a scout for ACF Fiorentina.

== Managerial statistics ==
Team	Nat.	From	To	P	W	D	L	GS	GA	%W
Bangladesh	(Bangladesh)	10 September 2015	27 November 2015	3	0	0	3	0	11	0.00

Team	Nat.	From	To	P	W	D	L	GS	GA	%W
FK Banga Gargždai	(Lithuania)	10 January 2007	27 March 2008	40	16	15	9	60	25	40.00

Team	Nat.	From	To	P	W	D	L	GS	GA	%W
B.G. Sports Club	(Maldives)	3 March 2013	20 November 2013	15	7	3	5	23	10	46.67

=== Managerial honours ===
Regional Cup Championship -

Three Regional Cup –

3 Place A Lyga FK Siauliai Championship

3 Place B.G. Sports Club Championship

2 Place Al-Ahli Saudi FC

== Personal life ==
Lopez is fluent in three languages (English, Italian & Lithuanian).
