= Trần Quốc Tuấn (football administrator) =

Football administrator (born 1971)

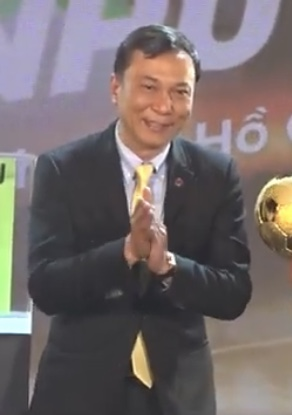
- Tuấn in 2022

9th President of Vietnam Football Federation
- Incumbent
- Assumed office 6 November 2022 (Note: Acting: 9 January – 6 November 2022)
- Vice President: Trần Anh Tú; Nguyễn Xuân Vũ; Nguyên Trung Kiên
- Preceded by: Lê Khánh Hải

6th Vice President of Professional Affairs of Vietnam Football Federation
- In office 25 March 2014 – 8 January 2022
- President: Lê Hùng Dũng; Lê Khánh Hải
- Preceded by: Phạm Ngọc Viễn; Phạm Văn Tuấn
- Succeeded by: Trần Anh Tú

5th Secretary General of Vietnam Football Federation
- In office June 2005 – July 2012
- Deputy Secretary General: Đỗ Văn Ninh; Dương Nghiệp Khôi
- Preceded by: Phạm Ngọc Viễn
- Succeeded by: Ngô Lê Bằng
Other offices held
Member of the FIFA National Teams Competitions Committee
Incumbent
Assumed office 7 October 2025
Chairperson of the Competitions Committee of Asian Football Confederation
Incumbent
Assumed office c. 2017
Deputy chairperson	Dastanbek Konokbaev
Member of the Executive Committee of Asian Football Confederation
Incumbent
Assumed office c. 2017
In office c. 2011 – c. 2015
Member of the Executive Committee of Vietnam Football Federation
In office c. 2001 – c. 2005
Deputy Head of the Competitions Committee of Vietnam Football Federation
Incumbent
Assumed office c. 2001

Personal details
- Born: 5 January 1971 (age 55) Phú Phong, Bình Định, South Vietnam
- Party: Communist (2002–present)

Trần Quốc Tuấn (Note: Vietnamese pronunciation: [t͡ɕən˨˩ kuək̚˧˦ twən˧˦]) (born 5 January 1971) is a Vietnamese football administrator and the president of the Vietnam Football Federation since 2022. He has also been a Chairperson of the Competitions Committee of the Asian Football Confederation since 2017 and Member of the FIFA National Teams Competitions Committee since 2025, respectively.

== Early life and education ==
Tuấn was born on 5 January 1971 in Bình Định, South Vietnam. His dad Trần Vĩnh Lộc, was a Director of the Department of Physical Education and Sports of Phú Khánh province and his mom Bùi Thị Hồng Tiến, was a North Vietnam mountain running champion. He was guided by his family towards a career in sports.

He studied in Russian SFSR, Soviet Union (now Russia) from 1990 to 1994 and successfully got his Ph. D. degree in Physical Education and Sports Science in 1998, at the age of 27.

== Career ==
Tuấn worked as the executive committee of the Vietnam Football Federation during his 4th Congress.

=== Vietnam Football Federation ===
==== Secretary General ====
Tuấn elected Secretary General of Vietnam Football Federation during the 5th Congress in June 2005.

During his time there, he oversaw the Vietnam's victory of the 2008 AFF Championship. He responded Bùi Tấn Trường's laser incident after the 1st leg of the 2010 AFF Championship semi-finals.

During the extraordinary press conference on 22 December 2011, he submitted the resignation, after the Vietnam U-23 failure at the 2011 SEA Games. However, the resignation was rejected, stating that the SEA Games failure was not the Secretary General's fault. The Federation then confirmed that the German head coach Falko Götz was the reason as the latter sacked the following day.

==== Vice presidency ====
During the 7th Congress of the Vietnam Football Federation on 25 March 2014, Tuấn was elected as the Vice President in charge of Professional Affairs.

During his time, he oversaw the Vietnam's victory of the 2018 AFF Championship, advanced to the third round of the 2022 FIFA World Cup qualification and qualified for the 2023 AFC Asian Cup, 2 gold medals from the 2019 SEA Games, Vietnam U-20 qualified to the 2017 FIFA U-20 World Cup, fourth place at the 2018 Asian Games and runners-up at the 2018 AFC U-23 Championship.

==== Presidency ====
On 9 January 2022, after Lê Khánh Hải was relieved of his duties as president, he became the acting President according to the Charter. On 7 November 2022, during the 9th Congress, 73 of 74 delegates elected him as the president of the Vietnam Football Federation.

During his time he oversaw, the Vietnam women's qualified for the 2023 FIFA Women's World Cup, Vietnam's victory of the 2024 ASEAN Championship, third place of the 2026 AFC U-23 Asian Cup, gold medal from the 2025 SEA Games, etc.

== Notes ==
Sporting positions
Preceded by Lê Khánh Hải	President of Vietnam Football Federation; 2021–present	Succeeded by Incumbent
