= Vietnamese National Youth Football Championship =

- Founded: 1996
- Country: Việt Nam
- Confederation: AFC
- Current champions: Sông Lam Nghệ An (2024)
- Most championships: Sông Lam Nghệ An (5 titles)
- Website: Official website
- Current: Current season

The Vietnamese National Youth Football Championship (Vietnamese: Giải vô địch bóng đá thiếu niên toàn quốc), is the national championship for association football for male players under the age of 13 organized by Vietnam Football Federation (VFF).

== Results ==
Year	Host	Final			Third place
Year	Host	Champion	Score	Runner-up	Third place
1996				Khánh Hoà	
1997		Nghệ An	1-0	Khánh Hoà	Thái Nguyên; Đà Nẵng
1998		Nghệ An	-	Khánh Hoà	
1999	Đà Nẵng	Thái Nguyên	2-0	Khánh Hoà	Nghệ An; Phú Thọ
2000	Ho Chi Minh City	Thái Nguyên	0-0, 4-1 (9m)	Khánh Hoà	Quảng Ninh; Hoà Bình
2001	Hà Nội	Phú Thọ	3-0	Tuyên Quang	Thái Nguyên; Gia Lai
2002	Thái Nguyên	Hà Giang	3-0	Thái Nguyên	Hà Tĩnh; Bình Phước
2003	Nghệ An	Sông Lam Nghệ An	2-1	Hà Tĩnh	Ninh Thuận; Phú Yên
2004	Quảng Ninh	Quảng Ninh	0-0, 10-9 (7m30)	Đà Nẵng	Phú Yên; Tuyên Quang
2005	Bình Định	Long An	1-0	Bình Định	Đà Nẵng; Ninh Thuận
2006	Hải Phòng	Thừa Thiên-Huế	1-1, 4-1 (7m30)	Thái Bình	Khánh Hòa; Ninh Thuận
2007	Hà Nội	Đà Nẵng	1-1, 5-4 (7m30)	Thái Bình	Hà Nội; Huế
2008	Thanh Hóa	Phú Yên	2-1	SHB Đà Nẵng	Hà Nội; Thái Bình
2009	Khánh Hòa	Long An	3-0	Đồng Tháp	Sơn La; Hoàng Anh Gia Lai
2010	Bình Định	PVF Thành phố Hồ Chí Minh	4-1	Bình Định	An Giang; Long An
2011	Thái Bình	Viettel	1-0	PVF	Đắc Lắc; Hà Nội
2012	Ninh Thuận	PVF	1-0	Viettel	Ninh Thuận; Hà Nội
2013	Khánh Hòa	Sông Lam Nghệ An	2-1	Viettel	Thành phố Hồ Chí Minh; Hà Nội T&T
2014	Hà Nội	Sông Lam Nghệ An	1-1,5-3(7m30)	Hải Dương	Công An Nhân Dân; Viettel
