= Étoile de Giadinh =

Disbanded Vietnamese football club

- Full name: Étoile de Giadinh; Câu lạc bộ bóng đá Ngôi Sao Gia Định
- Founded: 1907; 119 years ago
- Dissolved: 1954; 72 years ago
- Stadium: Fourrières Stadium; Étoile de Giadinh Stadium

Étoile de Giadinh, also known as Ngôi Sao Gia Định (English: Giadinh Star) was a football club based in Saigon, French Indochina. It played in Championat de Cochinchine, the first division of French Indochina. The club played its home matches on Fourrières Stadium located right next to Lê Văn Duyệt's Tomb, and Etoile de Giadinh Stadium on Mayer Street (now Võ Thị Sáu Street).

Founded in 1907, it was known for being one of the first ever football clubs formed by Vietnamese people.

== History ==
In 1907, Ba Vẽ founded Gia Định Sports Club, with Nguyễn Phú Khai being the chairman. This was the first Vietnamese football team founded. At that time, there were players such as Paul Thi, Huyện Thơm, Louis Gồng, Lucien Hộ, Pierre Đại (as goalkeeper).

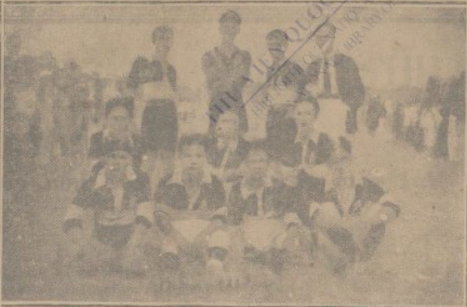
Etoile de Giadinh on 9 March 1927.

In 1917, at the first Championnat Cochinchine, Gia Định advanced to the final, meeting Cercle Sportif Saigonnais at Ông Thượng Stadium. Gia Định then won 1-0 and took their first championship. In 1922, following a discussion with Nguyễn Đình Trị, the founder of Etoile Bleu, the two clubs merged to each other and formed Etoile de Giadinh (Ngôi sao Gia Định).

In 1925, after the conflict in the rivalry match against Cercel Sportif Saigonnais, Giadinh then decided to withdraw from the French Sports General Department, established the Annam Football General Department and organized a football tournament with Vietnamese teams.

From 1925 to 1945, Étoile de Giadinh has won 8 cups, include 4 Cochinchina Championships in 1932, 1933, 1935, 1936.

In 1954, after France withdrew from Vietnam in 1954, the club disbanded. Most of the team former players joined Association de la Jeunesse Sportive, who later became one of the most successful clubs in the South Vietnam Division of Honour.

== Rivalry ==
The club's rival is Cercle Sportif Saigonnais, which is the first ever sport club in Vietnam that was formed by French.

In the 1925 season, while the final match between Giadinh Star and their rival Sportif Saigonnais was taking place, a scuffle broke out between Saigonnas goalkeeper Garrence and Giadinh player Thi. The entire Saigonnas team then chased after Thi, and the Giadinh team rushed in to defend him. Giadinh fans also started booing and protesting against Saigonnais. The referee then sent both Thi and Garrence off the field. Thi was permanently suspended from football.

== Honours ==
=== Domestic ===
League

- Championnat de Cochinchine:
  - Champion: 1917, 1923, 1928–1929
- Nam Kỳ Championship:
  - Champion: 1932, 1933, 1935, 1936

== Record ==
- Highest attendance: 5.000 attendance (Étoile de GiaDinh ?-? British Ship S/S Oanfa club, on 22 May 1927)

== See also ==
- List of football clubs in Vietnam
