= List of football clubs in Vietnam =

This is a list of football clubs in Vietnam.

== V.League 1 ==
- Bac Ninh
- Cong An Hanoi
- Cong An Ho Chi Minh City
- Dong A Thanh Hoa
- Hanoi FC
- Haiphong
- Hoang Anh Gia Lai
- Hong Linh Ha Tinh
- Ninh Binh
- SHB Da Nang
- Song Lam Nghe An
- The Cong-Viettel
- Thep Xanh Nam Dinh
- Truong Tuoi Dong Nai

== V.League 2 ==
- Becamex Ho Chi Minh City
- Dong Thap
- Ho Chi Minh City FC
- Hue
- Hung Yen
- Khatoco Khanh Hoa
- Lam Dong
- Long An
- PVF-CAND
- Thep Can Tho
- Quy Nhon United
- Thai Nguyen
- Van Hien University
- Xuan Thien Phu Tho

== Vietnamese Football League Second Division ==
- Dak Lak
- Ho Chi Minh City Youth
- Ha Tinh
- Hoai Duc
- Kon Tum
- PVF
- SHB Da Nang B
- Tay Ninh
- Vinh Long

== Vietnamese Football League Third Division ==
- Becamex Bình Dương B
- Can Tho
- Cong An Hanoi B
- Dao Ha Football Center
- Dong A Thanh Hoa B
- Dong Nai
- Hanoi FC B
- Thong Nhat Sports Center
- Hoang Anh Gia Lai B
- Phu Tho (2019)
- Phu Yen
- Thep Xanh Nam Dinh B
- Zantino Vinh Phuc

== Women's National League ==
- Hanoi I
- Hanoi II
- Ho Chi Minh City I
- Ho Chi Minh City II
- Phong Phu Ha Nam
- Son La
- Thai Nguyen T&T
- Than KSVN

== Notable defunct football clubs ==
- An Giang
- Ben Tre
- Binh Dien
- Binh Thuan
- Ca Mau
- Customs
- Dinh Huong Phu Nhuan
- Dong A Bank
- Équipe Féminine de Cai-Vôn
- Étoile de Giadinh
- General Department of Railways
- Hanoi (1956)
- Hanoi ACB
- Hanoi Sun
- Ho Chi Minh City Police
- Hoa Binh
- Hoa Phat Hanoi
- Hoang Sang
- Khatoco Khanh Hoa
- Kien Giang
- Mancons Saigon
- Navibank Saigon
- Ninh Thuan
- People's Public Security
- Quang Nam
- Quang Ngai
- Saigon FC
- Saigon Port
- Saigon United
- Song Be
- TDC Binh Dương
- Than Quang Ninh
- Thanh Hoa (1962)
- Thanh Hoa Police
- Tien Giang
- Trieu Minh
- Vissai Ninh Binh
- Xuan Thanh Saigon Cement
- 4th Military Region
- 7th Military Region
- 9th Military Region
