= Trần Nguyễn Bảo Châu =

Vietnamese footballer (born 1991)

Personal information
- Date of birth: 24 March 1991 (age 35)
- Place of birth: Châu Thành, Bà Rịa-Vũng Tàu, Vietnam
- Height: 1.65 m (5 ft 5 in)
- Position: Midfielder

Team information
- Current team: Hồ Chí Minh City
- Number: 72

Youth career
- 2007–2010: Hồ Chí Minh City

Senior career*
Years	Team	Apps	(Gls)
2010–	Hồ Chí Minh City		

International career
2013–2022	Vietnam	8	(0)
- * Club domestic league appearances and goals

Trần Nguyễn Bảo Châu (born 24 March 1991) is a Vietnamese footballer who plays as a midfielder for V-Women's League club Hồ Chí Minh City.

== Club career ==
Born in Bà Rịa-Vũng Tàu, Bảo Châu made her debut for Hồ Chí Minh City in 2010. Following the retirement of Đoàn Thị Kim Chi in 2013, Bảo Châu became one of the most important players of the team.

In March 2025, Bảo Châu scored a goal in Hồ Chí Minh City's historical 5–4 win against Abu Dhabi Country Club at the 2024–25 AFC Women's Champions League, advancing to the semi-finals with the club.

== International career ==
Bảo Châu was part of the Vietnam's squad that won the 2019 AFF Women's Championship and the 2019 SEA Games Gold medal.
