= Tây Sơn district =

Tây Sơn district Huyện Tây Sơn
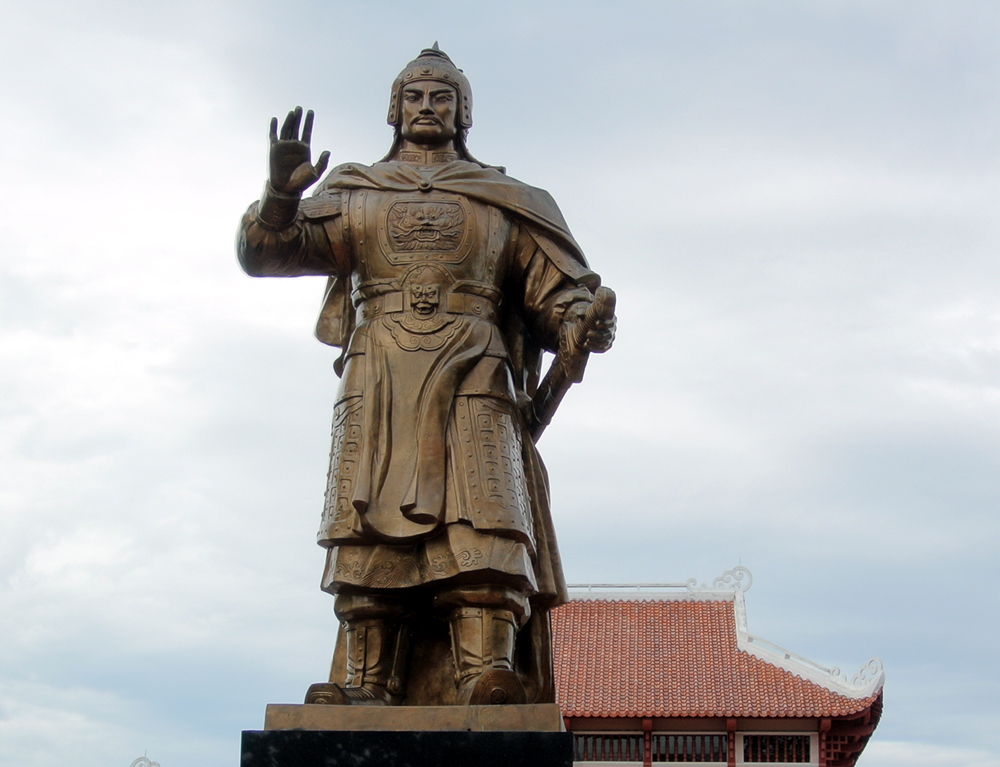
- Statue of Quang Trung in Tây Sơn District

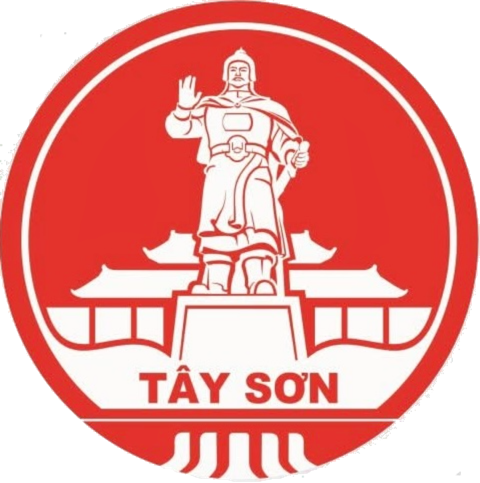
- Seal
- Interactive map of Tây Sơn district
- Location within Vietnam
- Coordinates: 13.917°N 108.917°E
- Country: Vietnam
- Region: South Central Coast
- Province: Bình Định (From 01/07/2025: Gia Lai)
- Capital: Phú Phong

Area
  - Total: 690 km^{2} (270 sq mi)

Population (2024)
  - Total: 210,700
  - Density: 310/km^{2} (790/sq mi)
- Time zone: UTC+7 (Indochina Time)

Tây Sơn is a former district in Bình Định Province, Vietnam (now part of Gia Lai Province). It is known for being the birthplace of the Tây Sơn dynasty - the pride of the people of Bình Định.

The district capital lies at Phú Phong.

As of July 1, 2025, Tây Sơn District will be officially dissolved and reorganized into communes under Gia Lai Province.

== Geography ==
Tây Sơn District is located in the western part of Bình Định Province. It is the starting point of a vast plain on the basins of the Kôn and Hà Thanh rivers. The district has no coastline and is geographically bordered as follows:

- To the east: An Nhơn Town and Phù Cát District
- To the west: Đak Pơ District, Kông Chro District, and An Khê Town of Gia Lai Province
- To the south: Vân Canh District
- To the north: Vĩnh Thạnh District

Tây Sơn District covers a natural area of 692.96 km^{2} (267.55 sq mi) with a population of 176,600 people.

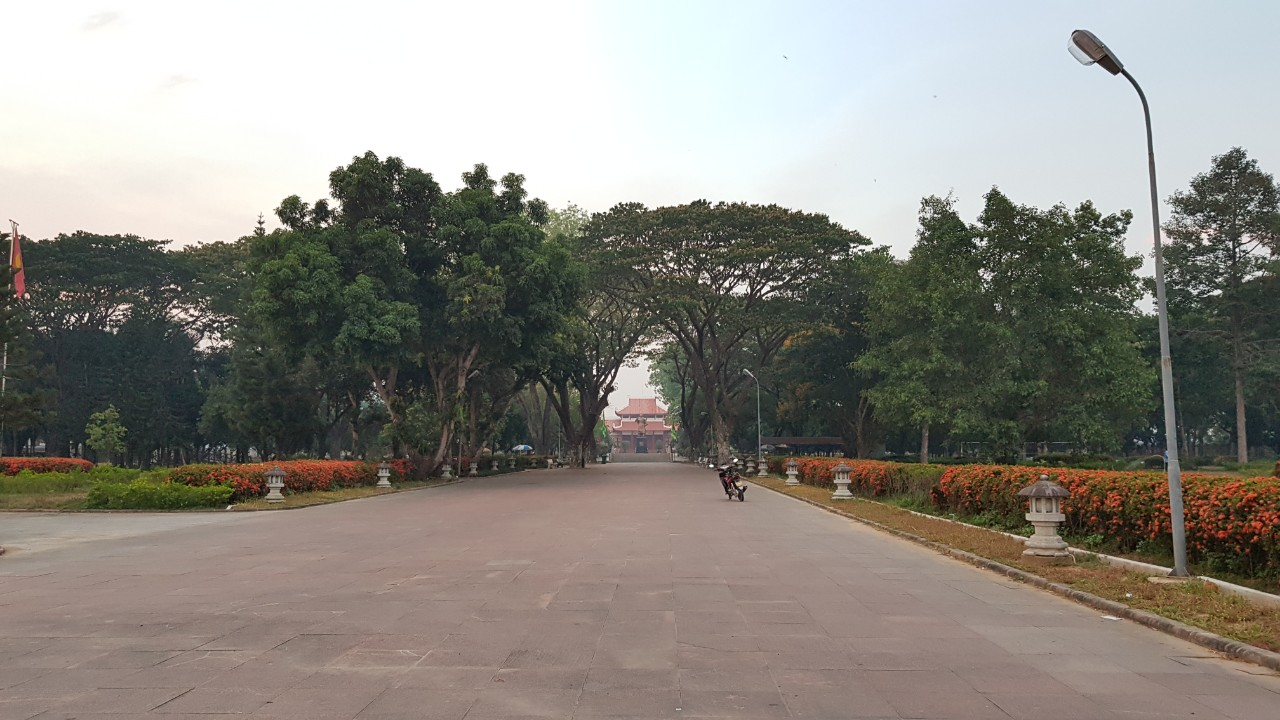
Main way to Quang Trung museum.

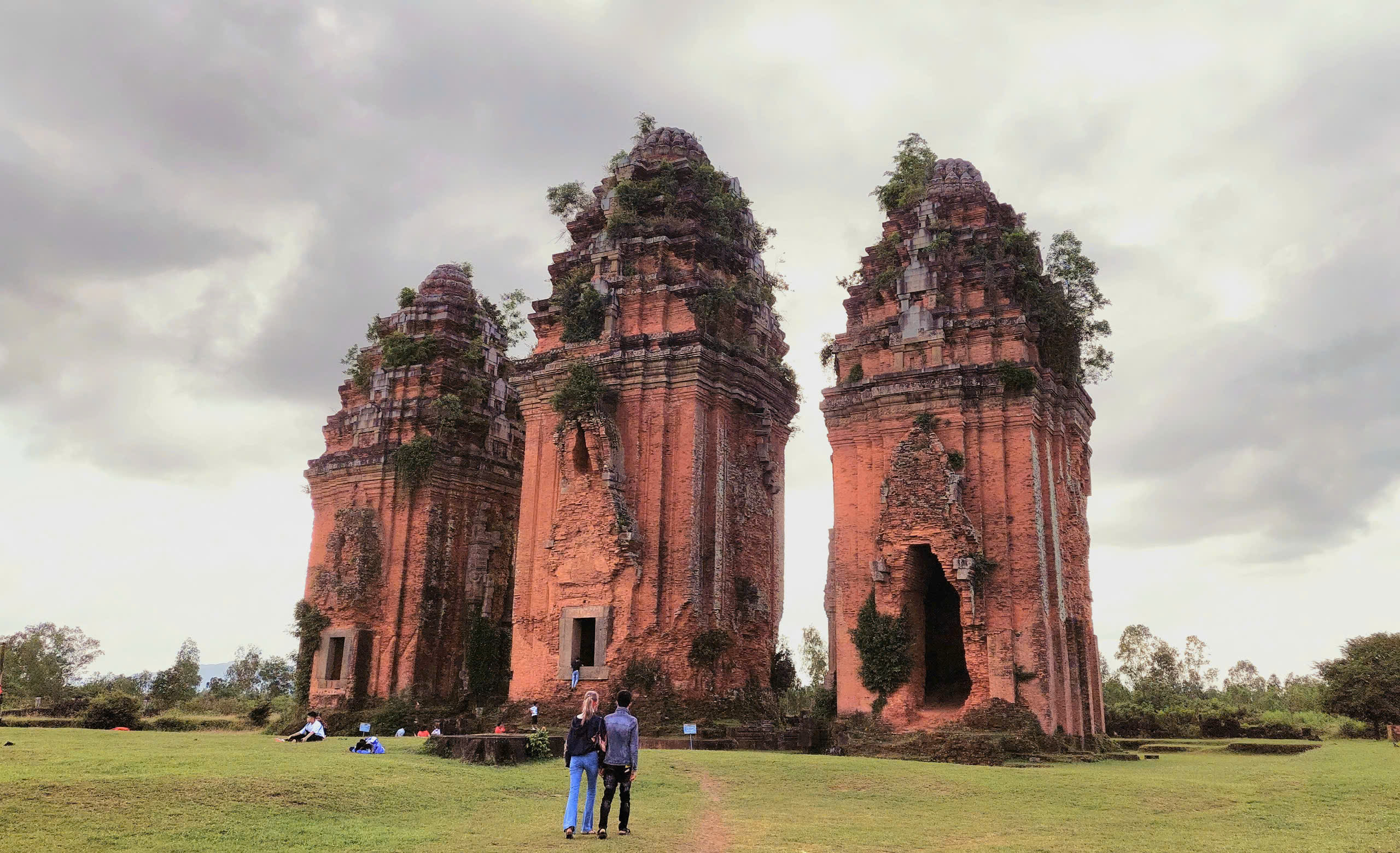
Ruin of Duong Long Cham Temple in Tây Sơn.

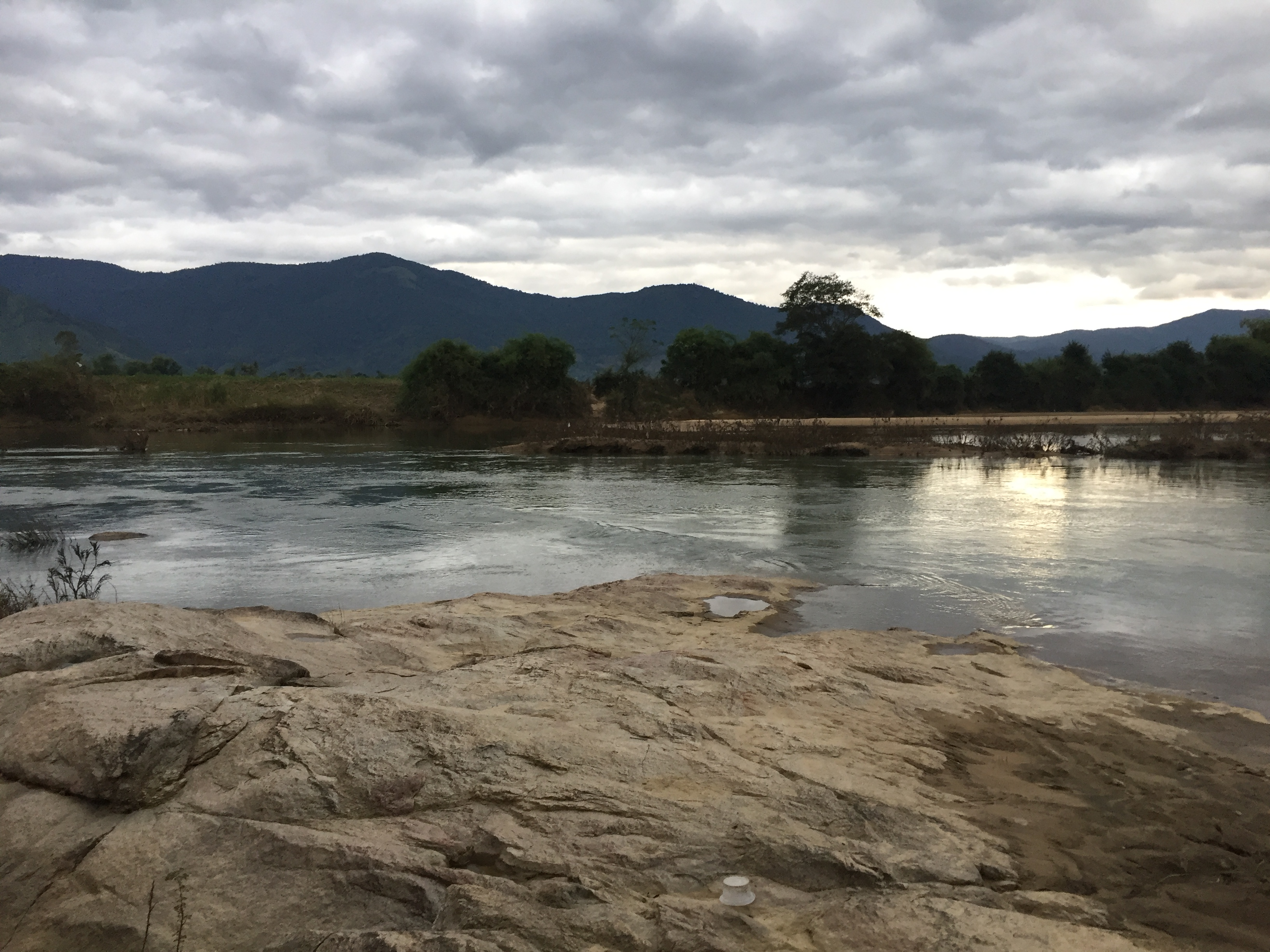
Kut river.

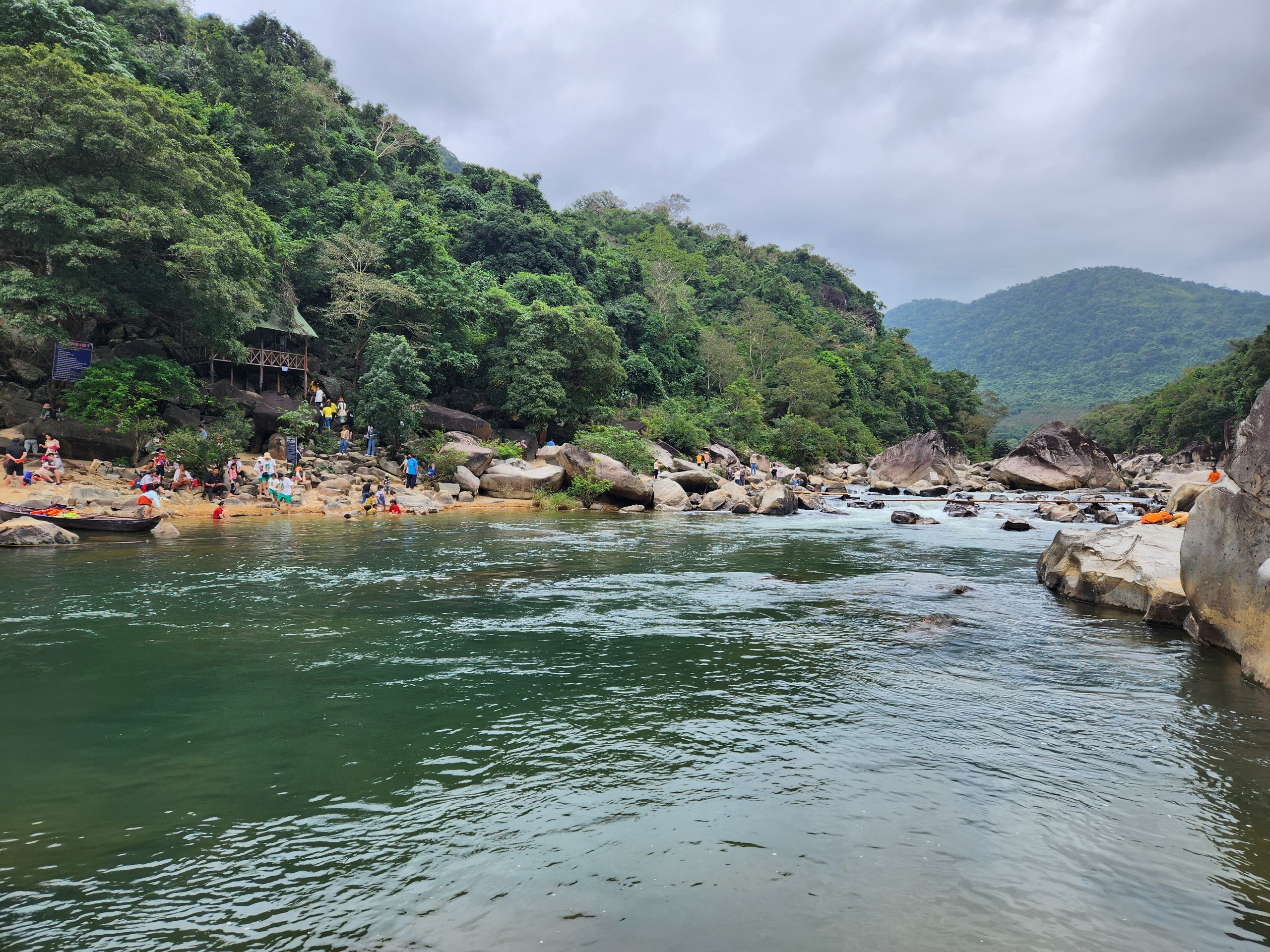
Stream in Hầm Hô.

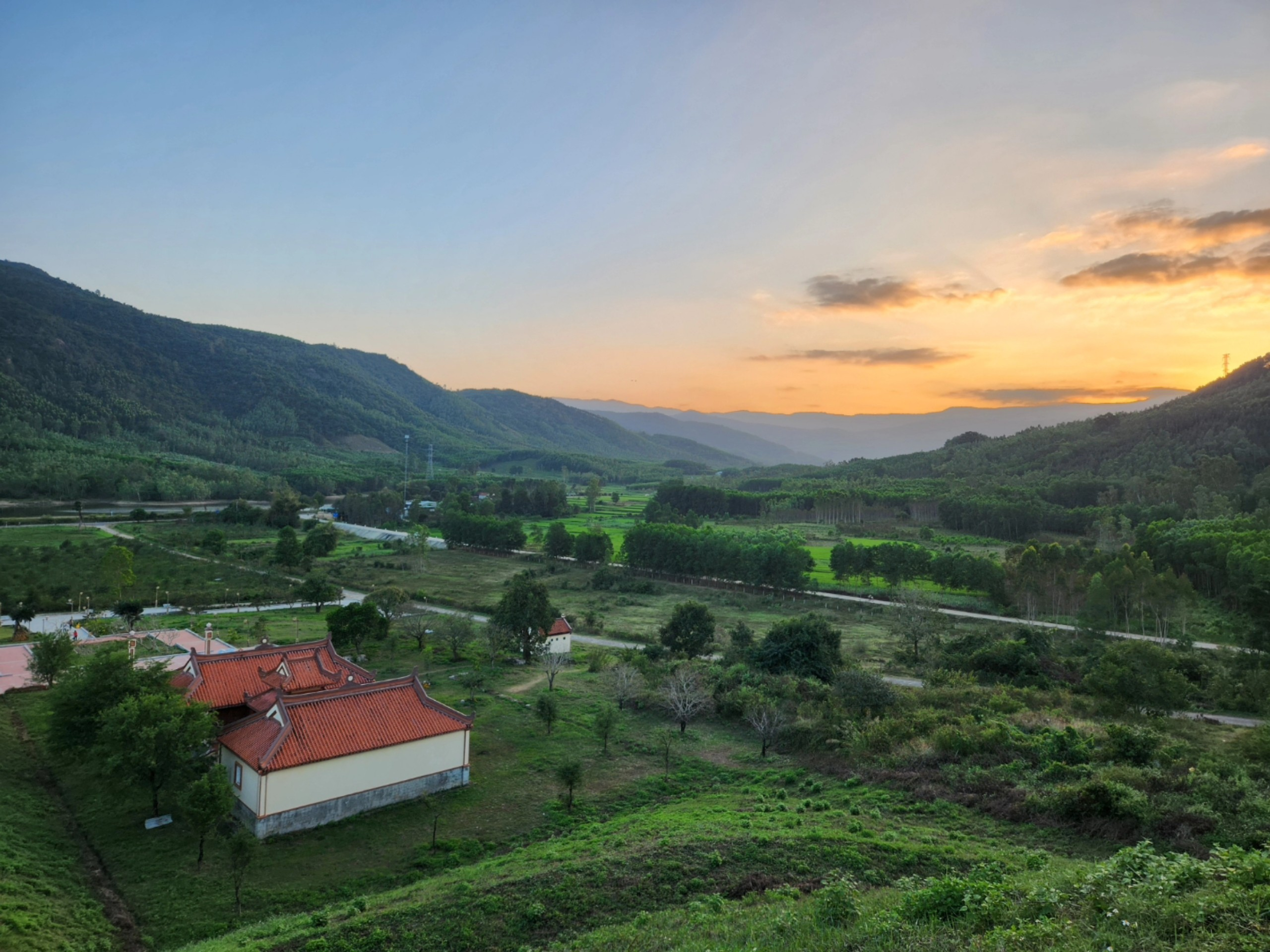
The reconstructed ritual offerings to the Earth and Heaven altar used by Tây Sơn brothers before revolution.

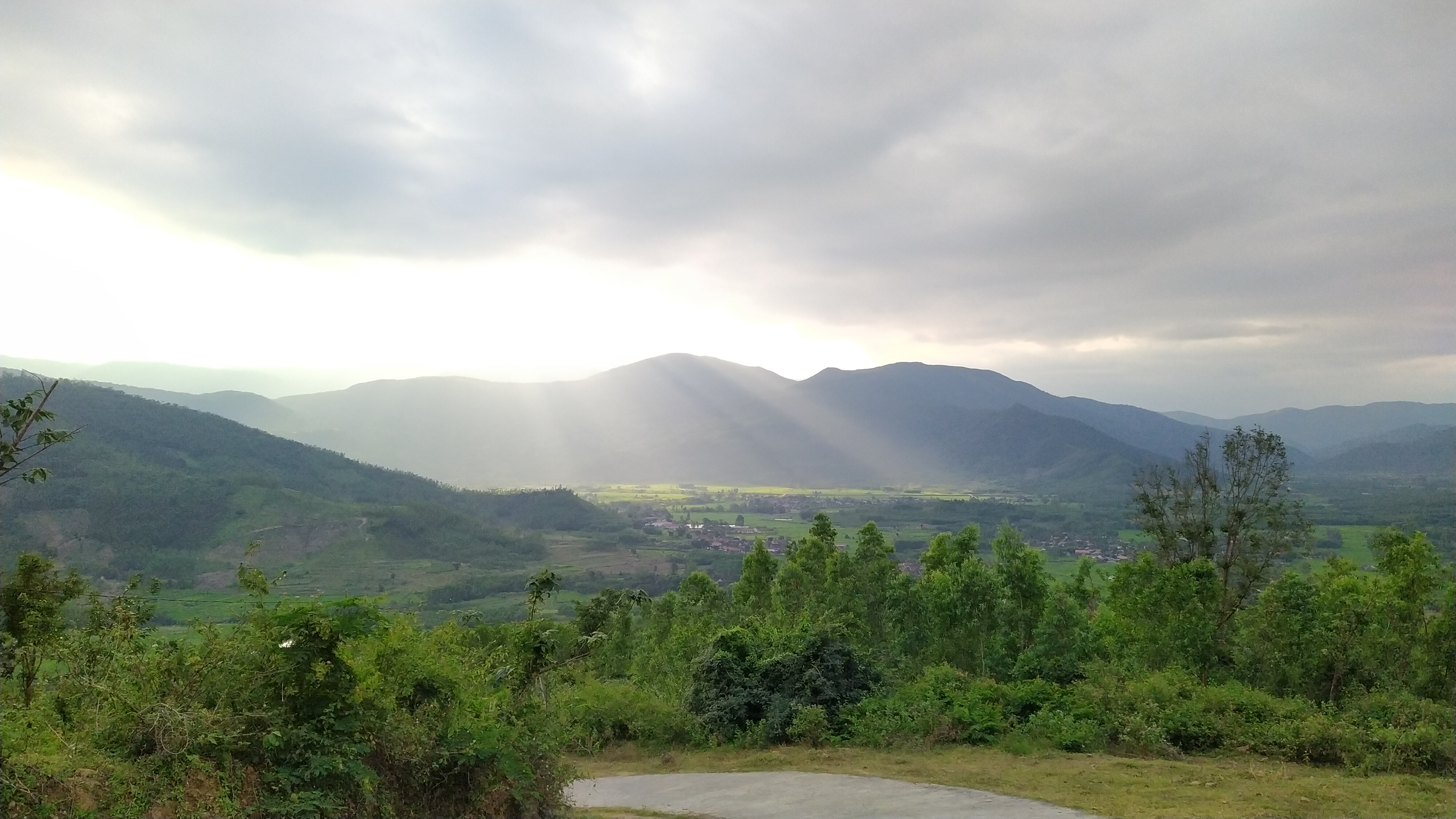
The view of Tây Sơn.

The district’s climate belongs to the tropical monsoon type, with two main seasons: the dry season from March to October and the rainy season from November to February. The rainy season here is often accompanied by cold weather and high humidity, while the dry season usually brings intense heat. The record low temperature ever recorded was 13 °C, and the highest was 39 °C.

The Kôn River flows through the district in a southeast direction, from Vĩnh Thạnh District to An Nhơn Town. The district capital is Phú Phong Town, located on the banks of the Kôn River, about 40 km from Quy Nhơn City and 20 km from Phù Cát Airport, with National Highways 19 and 19B running through it. An Khê Pass, on National Highway 19, also forms the boundary between Tây Sơn District and An Khê Town of Gia Lai Province.

== Transport and economy ==
Most of the communes of Tây Sơn District lie on provincial road 19.
