= Hồ Chí Minh City II W.F.C. =

Vietnamese women's football club

Hồ Chí Minh City II Women's FC
- Full name: Câu lạc bộ bóng đá nữ Thành phố Hồ Chí Minh II
- Nickname: Hồ Chí Minh City II
- Founded: 2015; 11 years ago as Tao Đàn WFC
- Ground: Thành Long Stadium
- Capacity: 4,000
- Chairman: Nguyễn Minh Sơn
- Manager: Lưu Ngọc Mai
- League: V-Women's League
- 2025: Vietnamese Women's National League, 6th
Home colours	Away colours

Ho Chi Minh City II Women's Football Club (Vietnamese: Câu lạc bộ Bóng đá nữ Thành phố Hồ Chí Minh II) is a Vietnam women's football club, based in Ho Chi Minh City, Vietnam. The team plays in the V-Women's League.

The team's home stadium is the Thành Long Stadium.

== History ==
Hồ Chí Minh City II WFC. was founded in 2015 as Tao Đàn WFC. The club later adopted its current name Hồ Chí Minh City II WFC and became the youth team of Hồ Chí Minh City I

== Current squad ==
As of 2017

Note: Flags indicate national team as defined under FIFA eligibility rules; some limited exceptions apply. Players may hold more than one non-FIFA nationality.

No.	Pos.	Nation	Player
2	GK	VIE	Đỗ Thị Thúy Kiều
3	DF	VIE	Trần Thị Kim Anh
4	DF	VIE	Nguyễn Thị Ngọc Giàu
11	MF	VIE	Nguyễn Thị Thanh Tâm
17	FW	VIE	Nguyễn Thị Tuyết Mai
20	FW	VIE	Nguyễn Ngọc Thanh Như
22	FW	VIE	Nguyễn Thị Thảo Mai
24	MF	VIE	Đoàn Thị Ngọc Phượng
16	MF	VIE	Lê Thị Cẩm Dung
28	MF	VIE	Nguyễn Thị Ngọc Mai
29	MF	VIE	Ngô Thị Hồng Nhung
32	MF	VIE	Lê Thị Hồng Tươi

No.	Pos.	Nation	Player
33	DF	VIE	Nguyễn Thị Tâm
38	MF	VIE	Nguyễn Thị Ngọc Hiếu
41	MF	VIE	Nguyễn Thị Yến Nhi
42	MF	VIE	Hồ Thị Anh Đào
43	DF	VIE	Hồ Thị Kim Ngân
46	MF	VIE	Hoàng Thị ngọc Tâm
47	MF	VIE	Huỳnh Thị Giàu
50	FW	VIE	Lê Diễm Mi
51	DF	VIE	Nguyễn Thị Huỳnh Anh
56	DF	VIE	Cù Thị Huỳnh Như
58	DF	VIE	Phạm Thúy An
60	MF	VIE	Trần Thị Cẩm Linh
61	GK	VIE	Mai Mi Mi

== Bibliography ==
- (in Vietnamese)
