= Ngọc Minh Chuyên =

Vietnamese footballer (born 2004)

Personal information
- Date of birth: 23 June 2004 (age 22)
- Place of birth: Chiêm Hóa, Tuyên Quang, Vietnam
- Height: 1.50 m (4 ft 11 in)
- Position: Forward

Team information
- Current team: Thái Nguyên T&T
- Number: 9

Youth career
- 2019–2023: Thái Nguyên T&T

Senior career*
Years	Team	Apps	(Gls)
2021–	Thái Nguyên T&T	27	(19)

International career^{‡}
2022–2024	Vietnam U20	26	(21)
2025–	Vietnam	8	(1)
- * Club domestic league appearances and goals ‡ National team caps and goals as of 17 December 2025

Ngọc Minh Chuyên (born 23 June 2004) is a Vietnamese footballer who plays as a forward for Women's Championship club Thái Nguyên T&T.

== Club career ==
Born in Tuyển Quang, Minh Chuyên started playing football at a youth age, playing for her school team. In 2019, she joined the Thái Nguyên youth academy after her school's football coach presented her to the team.

At the age of 17, he was promoted to Thái Nguyên T&T first team in 2021. She scored her first senior goal in her team 3–1 victory Vietnamese Women's National League win against Phong Phú Hà Nam. In 2023, she was named as the Best Vietnamese Young Women Player of the Year.

== International career ==
With Vietnam U19, Minh Chuyên was the joint-top scorer of the 2022 and 2023 AFF U-19 Women's Championship. During both times, Vietnam finished as runners-up in the tournament.

In October 2023, she received her first call up to the Vietnam national team, featuring in the preliminary squad for the 2022 Asian Games but was not included in the final list.

On 16 May 2025, she made her debut and also scored a goal for national team against SV Werder Bremen at friendly match.

== International goals ==
=== Vietnam U20 ===
No.	Date	Venue	Opponent	Score	Result	Competition
1.	24 July 2022	Palembang, Indonesia	Singapore	1–0	9–0	2022 AFF U-18 Women's Championship
2.	24 July 2022	Palembang, Indonesia	Singapore	3–0	9–0	2022 AFF U-18 Women's Championship
3.	26 July 2022	Palembang, Indonesia	Indonesia	1–1	2–1	2022 AFF U-18 Women's Championship
4.	28 July 2022	Palembang, Indonesia	Cambodia	2–0	7–0	2022 AFF U-18 Women's Championship
5.	28 July 2022	Palembang, Indonesia	Cambodia	5–0	7–0	2022 AFF U-18 Women's Championship
6.	2 August 2022	Palembang, Indonesia	Myanmar	2–0	4–1	2022 AFF U-18 Women's Championship
7.	9 March 2023	Việt Trì, Vietnam	Singapore	1–0	11–0	2024 AFC U-20 Women's Asian Cup qualification
8.	9 March 2023	Việt Trì, Vietnam	Singapore	7–0	11–0	2024 AFC U-20 Women's Asian Cup qualification
9.	9 March 2023	Việt Trì, Vietnam	Singapore	9–0	11–0	2024 AFC U-20 Women's Asian Cup qualification
10.	9 March 2023	Việt Trì, Vietnam	Singapore	11–0	11–0	2024 AFC U-20 Women's Asian Cup qualification
11.	3 June 2023	Việt Trì, Vietnam	Iran	2–1	3–2	2024 AFC U-20 Women's Asian Cup qualification
12.	5 June 2023	Việt Trì, Vietnam	Lebanon	1–0	3–0	2024 AFC U-20 Women's Asian Cup qualification
13.	5 June 2023	Việt Trì, Vietnam	Lebanon	3–0	3–0	2024 AFC U-20 Women's Asian Cup qualification
14.	6 July 2023	Palembang, Indonesia	Singapore	2–0	5–0	2023 AFF U-19 Women's Championship
15.	10 July 2023	Palembang, Indonesia	Malaysia	2–0	6–0	2023 AFF U-19 Women's Championship
16.	10 July 2023	Palembang, Indonesia	Malaysia	3–0	6–0	2023 AFF U-19 Women's Championship
17.	10 July 2023	Palembang, Indonesia	Malaysia	6–0	6–0	2023 AFF U-19 Women's Championship
18.	13 July 2023	Palembang, Indonesia	Myanmar	1–1	2–1 (a.e.t.)	2023 AFF U-19 Women's Championship
19.	27 February 2024	Tashkent, Uzbekistan	Uzbekistan	1–0	4–1	Friendly
20.	27 February 2024	Tashkent, Uzbekistan	Uzbekistan	3–1	4–1	Friendly
21.	10 March 2024	Tashkent, Uzbekistan	China	1–3	1–6	2024 AFC U-20 Women's Asian Cup

=== National team ===
No.	Date	Venue	Opponent	Score	Result	Competition
1.	29 June 2025	Việt Trì Stadium, Việt Trì, Vietnam	Maldives	6–0	7–0	2026 AFC Women's Asian Cup qualification

== Honours ==
Individual

- AFF U-19 Women's Championship Top Scorer: 2022, 2023
- Best Vietnamese Young Women Player of the Year: 2023
