= Vietnamese Women's National Cup =

- Founded: 2019
- Region: Vietnam
- Teams: 6 (as of 2026)
- Current champions: Hồ Chí Minh City I (5th title)
- Most championships: Hồ Chí Minh City I (5 titles)
- Website: Home page
- 2026 Vietnamese Women's National Cup

The Vietnamese Women's National Cup, officially Women's National Cup (Vietnamese: Giải Bóng đá nữ Cúp Quốc Gia) is the annual top cup competition for women's football clubs in Vietnam – designed as an equivalent to the Vietnamese National Football Cup.

The current title holders are Hồ Chí Minh City I, having won their record fifth title in 2026 edition after beating Hà Nội I in the final at Thái Nguyên.

== Results by year ==
Year	Host city	Final			Third place
Year	Host city	Champion	Score	Runner-up	Third place
2019	Hà Nội	Phong Phú Hà Nam	1–0	Hà Nội I	TNG Thái Nguyên
2020	Hà Nội	Hồ Chí Minh City I	2–0	Than Khoáng Sản VN	Hà Nội I Watanabe
2021	Hà Nội	Hồ Chí Minh City I	2–0	Hà Nội I	Phong Phú Hà Nam
2022	Hà Nội	Hồ Chí Minh City I	1–1 (5–4 p.)	Hà Nội I	Than Khoáng Sản VN
2023	Hà Nội; Hưng Yên	Than Khoáng Sản VN	2–2 (5–4 p.)	Hà Nội I	Phong Phú Hà Nam
2024	Hà Nội	Than Khoáng Sản VN	1–0	Thái Nguyên T&T	Ho Chi Minh City
2025	Hà Nội	Hồ Chí Minh City I	1–0	Thái Nguyên T&T	Phong Phú Hà Nam
2026	Thái Nguyên	Hồ Chí Minh City I	0–0 (3–0 p.)	Hà Nội I	Thái Nguyên T&T
