= Vietnam Football Federation =

Sports governing body

Viet Nam Football Federation
AFC
- Short name: VFF (LĐBĐVN)
- Founded: 1989; 37 years ago
- Headquarters: Hanoi, Vietnam
- FIFA affiliation: 1952 (State of Vietnam); 1964 (North Vietnam)
- AFC affiliation: 1954 (State of Vietnam); 1964 (North Vietnam)
- AFF affiliation: 1996 (S.R. Vietnam)
- President: Trần Quốc Tuấn
- Vice-President: Trần Anh Tú, Nguyễn Trung Kiên, Nguyễn Xuân Vũ
- General Secretary: Nguyễn Văn Phú
- Website: vff.org.vn

The Vietnam Football Federation (VFF; Liên đoàn Bóng đá Việt Nam) is the national governing body of association football, beach soccer, and futsal tournaments in Vietnam, and national teams of Vietnam. It is a member of the International Federation of Association Football (FIFA), the Asian Football Confederation (AFC), and the ASEAN Football Federation (AFF).

== History ==
Predecessor of the VFF was originally established in September 1962 in North Vietnam, as the Football Association of the Democratic Republic of Vietnam (Hội bóng đá nước Việt Nam Dân chủ Cộng hoà). Its first president was Hà Đăng Ấn, who was head of the Railway Department and had been a former football star. At that time, there was a separate football association in South Vietnam handling football in that region. Because of the division of Vietnam in 1954, association football developed separately in the two halves. The South Vietnam Federation was established in the early 1950s as the Vietnam National Football Association (VNFA, Vietnamese: Tổng cục Túc cầu Việt Nam, lit. 'General Department of Vietnamese Football') and joined FIFA and the AFC in 1964, while the predecessor of South Vietnam (State of Vietnam) had already joined FIFA in 1952 and the AFC in 1954 as the founding member. Following the country’s reunification under the North in 1975, Vietnam also inherited South Vietnam’s memberships in FIFA and the AFC.

In 1989, after the Đổi Mới reforms, Vietnamese sports, including association football, began re-integrating into more international activities. In August 1989, the first Congress of the later version of the federation was held in Hanoi. At that Congress, the organization was formally declared the Vietnam Football Federation (VFF).

== Board ==
Name	Position	Source
(Vietnam) Trần Quốc Tuấn	President	
(Vietnam) Trần Anh Tú	Senior vice-president	
(Vietnam) Nguyễn Trung Kiên	Vice-president	
(Vietnam) Nguyễn Xuân Vũ	Vice-president	
(Vietnam) Nguyễn Văn Phú	General secretary	
(Vietnam) Lê Hùng Dũng	Treasurer	
(Vietnam) Hoàng Văn Phúc	Team coach (women's)	
(South Korea) Kim Sang-sik	Team coach (men's)	
(Vietnam) Nguyễn Trung Lân	Media/communications manager	
(Vietnam) Dương Vũ Lâm	Futsal coordinator	
(Vietnam) Hà Lê Mạnh	Referee coordinator	
(Japan) Takeshi Koshida	Technical director	

== Tournaments ==
=== Domestic leagues ===
==== Women ====
- V-Women's League
- Vietnamese National Women's U-19 Football Championship
- Vietnamese National Women's U-16 Football Championship

==== Men ====
- V.League 1
- V.League 2
- Second Division
- Third Division
- Vietnamese National U-21 Football Championship
- Vietnamese National U-19 Football Championship
- Vietnamese National U-17 Football Championship
- Vietnamese National U-15 Football Championship
- Vietnamese National U-13 Football Championship
- Vietnamese National U-11 Football Championship
- Vietnam National Futsal League
- Vietnamese National Beach Soccer League

=== Domestic cups ===
- Vietnamese Women's National Cup
- Vietnamese National Football Cup
- Vietnamese National Football Super Cup
- Vietnamese National Futsal Cup

== National teams ==
=== Women ===
- Vietnam women's national football team
- Vietnam women's national under-20 football team
- Vietnam women's national under-17 football team
- Vietnam women's national futsal team

=== Men ===
- Vietnam national football team
- Vietnam national under-23 football team
- Vietnam national under-21 football team
- Vietnam national under-20 football team
- Vietnam national under-17 football team
- Vietnam national futsal team
- Vietnam national under-20 futsal team
- Vietnam national beach soccer team

== Logo ==
In 1994, the VFF of the second term held a competition to design a new logo. The winning design was created by artist Nguyen Ngoc Than. The logo features a yellow background, a red triangle, and a stylized football. The red triangle represents the national flag, and the stylized football represents the passion for association football in Vietnam. The three letters VFF stand for Vietnam Football Federation.

The later logo of the VFF features a stylized football with the three letters "VFF" inside it. The football is surrounded by the Vietnamese flag, which is red with a yellow star in the center. The logo was designed to honor the history and development of association football in Vietnam, and to show the Federation's commitment to meeting the needs of fans, friends, and international association football organizations. It was designed by Nguyen Cong Quang and has been in use since 2008.

On April 28, 2008, the VFF Executive Committee officially announced the use of the new VFF logo in all related transactions from May 1, 2008. The use of the old logo ended on December 31, 2008.

1990–2008

2008–

== Rumor ==
In 2023, rumors circulated on social media that the VFF was about to receive up to $120 million to build two stadiums with a capacity of up to 50,000 and 100,000 seats. According to the source, the two new stadiums could be started in March 2024. On November 6, 2023, the VFF announced that the funding announcement for the new stadium was completely fabricated, and in fact, the VFF does not have authority to build or to oversee the construction of major facilities like stadiums.
