= Tây Sơn, Gia Lai =

Ward in Gia Lai province, Vietnam

Tây Sơn
- Ward
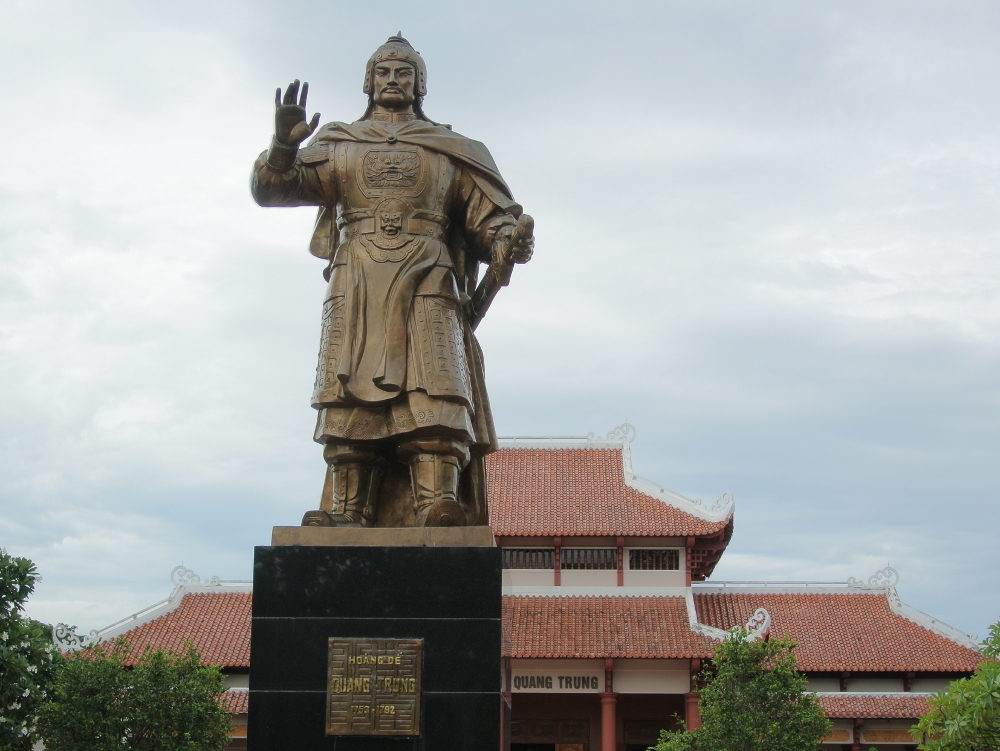
- Statue of King Quang Trung
- Interactive map of Tây Sơn
- Coordinates: 13.909575165730274°N 108.91871613165192°E
- Country: Vietnam
- Province: Gia Lai
- Established: 16 June 2025
- Administrative headquarters: Trần Quang Diệu Street

Area
  - Total: 97.70 km^{2} (37.72 sq mi)

Population (21 October 2026)
  - Total: 49,891
  - Density: 501/km^{2} (1,300/sq mi)

Tây Sơn is a ward of Gia Lai province in Vietnam.

== Geography ==
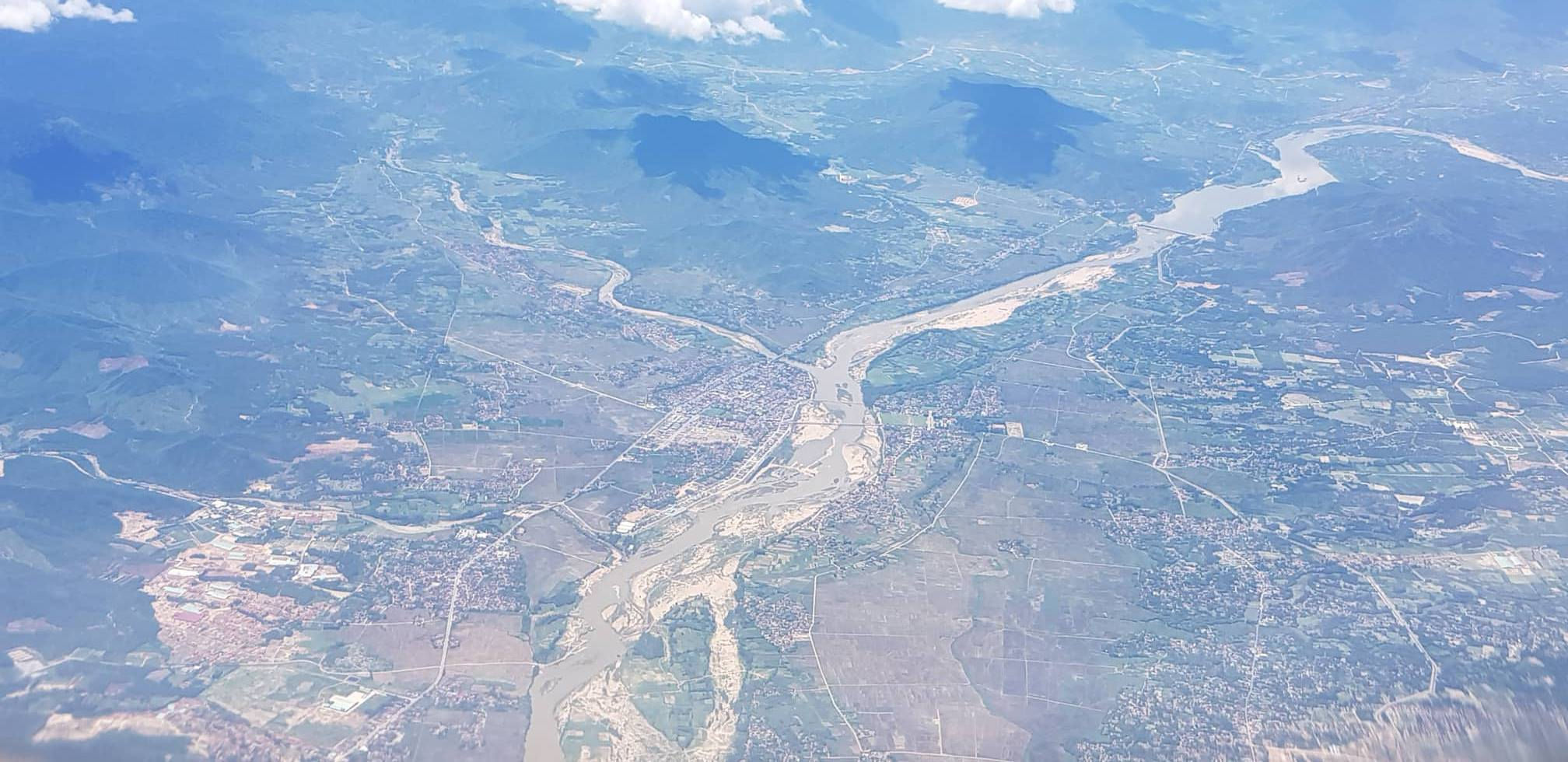
The area of Tây Sơn ward viewed from above

Tây Sơn ward is a ward in the eastern part of Gia Lai province, approximately 45 km northwest of Quy Nhơn and 125 km east of Pleiku. It is located in the area formerly administered by Tây Sơn district. The ward borders the following areas:

- To the north, Bình An commune.
- To the southwest, Canh Liên commune.
- To the northeast, Bình Định ward.
- To the southeast, An Nhơn Tây ward.
- To the west, Bình Phú commune.

The ward is situated at the confluence of the Côn River and the Phú Phong River, also known as the Kút River. National Route 19, National Route 19B, and the Quy Nhơn–Pleiku–Lệ Thanh Expressway pass through the ward.

== History ==
On 12 June 2025, the 15th National Assembly adopted Resolution No. 202/2025/QH15 on the reorganization of provincial-level administrative divisions. Under the resolution, the entire natural area and population of Gia Lai province and Bình Định province were merged to form a new province named Gia Lai.

On 16 June 2025, the Standing Committee of the National Assembly adopted Resolution No. 1664/NQ-UBTVQH15 on the reorganization of commune-level administrative divisions in Gia Lai province in 2025. Under the resolution, the entire natural area and population of Phú Phong township and the communes of Tây Xuân and Bình Nghi, formerly part of Tây Sơn district, were merged to form a new commune named Tây Sơn.

On 21 October 2026, the 13th-term Gia Lai Provincial People's Council adopted Resolution No. 386/NQ-HĐND approving in principle the establishment of Tây Sơn ward. Tây Sơn ward has an area of 97.70 km² and a population of 49,891. It was established with the same administrative boundaries as the former Tây Sơn commune.

== Heritage sites ==
There is a temple commemorating the Tây Sơn dynasty, which originated in the Tây Sơn district, as well as an ancestral temple dedicated to Bui Thi Xuan, one of its major generals, and a Tây Sơn Museum.

Several Cham temple towers are located in Tây Sơn ward.
